= 1967–68 Seattle SuperSonics season =

NBA professional basketball team season (inaugural season)

- Head coach: Al Bianchi
- General manager: Don Richman
- Owners: Sam Schulman
- Arena: Seattle Center Coliseum

Results
- Record: 23–59 (.280)
- Place: Division: 5th (Western)
- Playoff finish: Did not qualify
- Stats at Basketball Reference

Local media
- Television: KING-TV
- Radio: KOMO

The 1967–68 Seattle SuperSonics season was the inaugural season for the expansion Seattle SuperSonics franchise in the National Basketball Association. The team's official arena was the Seattle Center Coliseum.

With a team built in its majority from the 1967 expansion draft featuring Walt Hazzard and six-year veteran Tom Meschery, and with Al Bianchi at the head coach position, the Sonics finished the season with a 23–59 record and fifth place in the Western Division, six games behind the Chicago Bulls, and did not qualify to enter the playoffs.

== Offseason ==
=== Expansion draft ===
The twelve-man roster for the 1967–68 season consisted of three rookies from the 1967 NBA Draft and nine players from the expansion draft. Al Bianchi's choice of player-coach Richie Guerin from the St. Louis Hawks came as a surprise to most, since Guerin had already announced his retirement, and thus did not play for the Sonics. He would return for the 1968–69 season to play for the relocated Atlanta Hawks after Seattle traded him in the offseason. Selecting Tom Meschery from the San Francisco Warriors was made possible after the Warriors unprotected him for the draft, after Meschery informed the San Francisco front office that he desired to join the Peace Corps. Seattle's offer, however, was accepted by Meschery. The SuperSonics planned to sign former Seattle University player Charlie Williams before the start of the regular season, but league rules prohibited the Seattle franchise to offer him a contract, since Williams was expelled from college after a point shaving scandal.

=== Draft ===
| Round | Pick | Player | Position | Nationality | College |
|---|---|---|---|---|---|
| 1 | 6 | Al Tucker | SF | United States | Oklahoma Baptist |
| 2 | 19 | Bob Rule | C / PF | United States | Colorado State |
| 3 | 30 | Sam Singleton | G | United States | Nebraska–Omaha |
| 4 | 43 | Larry Bunce | C | United States | Utah State |
| 5 | 54 | Plummer Lott | SF / SG | United States | Seattle |
| 6 | 67 | Gordon Harris | C | United States | Washington |
| 7 | 78 | Dick Kolberg | F | United States | UC Santa Barbara |
| 8 | 91 | Willie Wolters | F | Germany | Boston College |
| 9 | 101 | Roderick McDonald | SF/PF | United States | Whitworth |
| 10 | 113 | Gary Lechman | G | United States | Gonzaga |
| 11 | 122 | Randy Matson | F | United States | Texas A&M |
| 12 | 133 | Rubin Russell | SG | United States | North Texas State |
| 13 | 140 | John Schroeder | C | United States | Ohio |
| 14 | 147 | Jim Sutherland | F | United States | Clemson |
| 15 | 152 | Willie Campbell | C | United States | Nebraska |

== Roster ==
1967–68 Seattle SuperSonics roster
Players

| Pos. | No. | Player | Height | Weight | DOB | From |
|---|---|---|---|---|---|---|
| F/C | 10 | Henry Akin | 6 ft 10 in (2.08 m) | 225 lb (102 kg) | 1944–07–31 | Morehead State |
| PG | 42 | Walt Hazzard | 6 ft 2 in (1.88 m) | 185 lb (84 kg) | 1942–04–15 | UCLA |
| SG | 11 | Tommy Kron | 6 ft 5 in (1.96 m) | 200 lb (91 kg) | 1943–02–28 | Kentucky |
| SF | 43 | Plummer Lott | 6 ft 5 in (1.96 m) | 210 lb (95 kg) | 1945–12–11 | Seattle |
| PF | 14 | Tom Meschery | 6 ft 6 in (1.98 m) | 215 lb (98 kg) | 1938–10–26 | Saint Mary's |
| F/C | 41 | Dorie Murrey | 6 ft 8 in (2.03 m) | 215 lb (98 kg) | 1943–09–07 | Detroit Mercy |
| F/C | 24 | Bud Olsen | 6 ft 8 in (2.03 m) | 220 lb (100 kg) | 1940–07–25 | Louisville |
| F/C | 45 | Bob Rule | 6 ft 9 in (2.06 m) | 220 lb (100 kg) | 1944–06–29 | Colorado State |
| SG | 44 | Rod Thorn | 6 ft 4 in (1.93 m) | 195 lb (88 kg) | 1941–05–23 | West Virginia |
| SF | 33 | Al Tucker | 6 ft 8 in (2.03 m) | 190 lb (86 kg) | 1943–02–24 | Oklahoma Baptist |
| PG | 12 | Bob Weiss | 6 ft 2 in (1.88 m) | 180 lb (82 kg) | 1942–05–07 | Penn State |
| C | 15 | George Wilson | 6 ft 8 in (2.03 m) | 225 lb (102 kg) | 1942–05–09 | Cincinnati |

Coaches
Head coach
- Al Bianchi

Legend
- (DP) Unsigned draft pick
- (FA) Free agent
- (S) Suspended
- Injured

== Standings ==
| Western Division | W | L | PCT | GB | Home | Road | Neutral | Div |
|---|---|---|---|---|---|---|---|---|
| x-St. Louis Hawks | 56 | 26 | .683 | – | 25–7 | 22–13 | 9–6 | 31–9 |
| x-Los Angeles Lakers | 52 | 30 | .634 | 4 | 30–11 | 18–19 | 4–0 | 28–12 |
| x-San Francisco Warriors | 43 | 39 | .524 | 13 | 27–14 | 16–23 | 0–2 | 24–16 |
| x-Chicago Bulls | 29 | 53 | .354 | 27 | 11–22 | 12–24 | 6–7 | 11–29 |
| Seattle SuperSonics | 23 | 59 | .280 | 33 | 10–21 | 7–24 | 6–14 | 15–25 |
| San Diego Rockets | 15 | 67 | .183 | 41 | 8–33 | 4–26 | 3–8 | 11–29 |

== Regular season ==
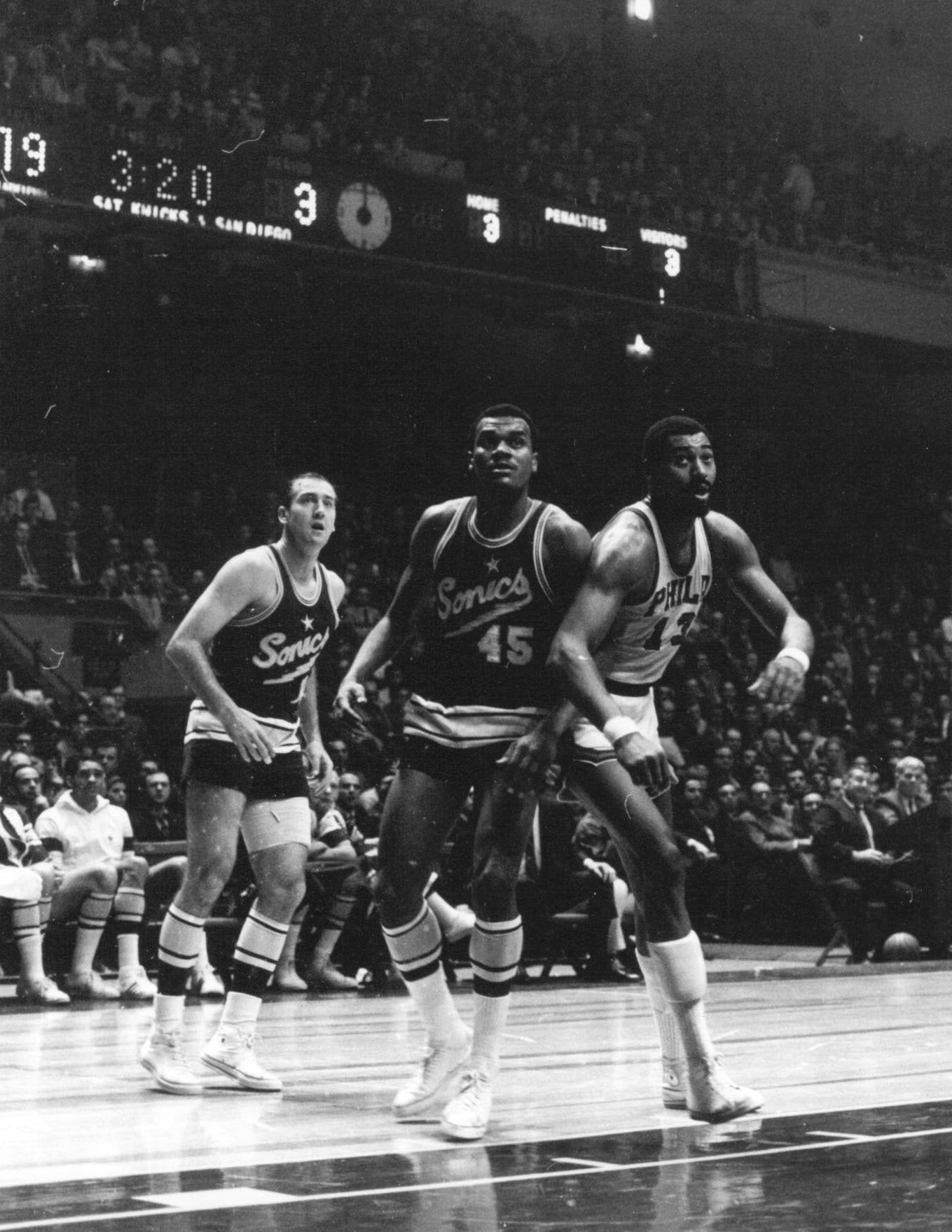
Seattle's Tom Meschery and Bob Rule against Philadelphia's Wilt Chamberlain in the SuperSonics' 118–107 loss to the 76ers at Madison Square Garden on December 12, 1967.

Seattle kicked off the regular season with a game against the San Francisco Warriors on October 13 at the Cow Palace, where they fell 114–116. Walt Hazzard had a high scoring debut, leading the Sonics' offense with 30 points, followed by Tom Meschery with 26. After a week off, the Sonics played in consecutive days against the other expansion franchise, the San Diego Rockets, splitting the series and thus winning their first regular season game in franchise history. After two streaks of four and eight straight losses, the Sonics found themselves quickly near the bottom of the Western Division by the end of the first four weeks of competition. A few surprising results stood out, including their only victory against Bill Russell's Boston Celtics in a double-header in Philadelphia, with the Celtics trailing by as much as 44 points after the first half, and an outstanding performance by rookie Bob Rule, with 47 points in a victory against the Los Angeles Lakers. On the other hand, the SuperSonics were on the losing end of two NBA scoring records. First, in December with a 122–160 loss against defending champions Philadelphia 76ers, that set a new NBA record for most points by a team in a quarter and a 123–154 loss against the Lakers on January that tied a franchise record for Los Angeles for most points in a game. With six games left in the regular season the Sonics were behind two games from the Chicago Bulls in a last effort to obtain a berth in the playoffs, But in spite of defeating the Bulls in two of those six games, Chicago managed to pull away with the fourth place in the Western Division and the last spot in the playoff race, six games above the Sonics.

The SuperSonics registered an attendance of 202,263 during the regular season, the sixth best in the league in that regard. Walt Hazzard was selected to represent the West in the 1968 NBA All-Star Game and Bob Rule and Al Tucker were selected to the NBA All-Rookie First Team.

== Game log ==
1967–68 game log
Total: 23–59 (Home: 10–21; Road: 7–23; Neutral: 6–15)
October: 2–6 (home: 1–2; road: 1–4)

| Game | Date | Team | Score | High points | High rebounds | High assists | Location Attendance | Record |
|---|---|---|---|---|---|---|---|---|
| 1 | October 13 | @ San Francisco | L 116–144 | Walt Hazzard (30) | Tom Meschery (11) | Bob Weiss (4) | Oakland–Alameda County Coliseum Arena; 5,619 | 0–1 |
| 2 | October 20 | San Diego | L 114–121 | Walt Hazzard (32) | Bob Rule (11) | Rod Thorn (9) | Seattle Center Coliseum; 4,473 | 0–2 |
| 3 | October 21 | @ San Diego | W 117–110 (OT) | Walt Hazzard (22) | Dorie Murrey (14) | Five players (2) | San Diego Sports Arena; 5,413 | 1–2 |
| 4 | October 22 | Cincinnati | L 94–106 | Walt Hazzard (27) | Tom Meschery (14) | Walt Hazzard (6) | Seattle Center Coliseum; 4,116 | 1–3 |
| 5 | October 24 | Baltimore | L 125–136 | Bob Rule (25) | George Wilson (13) | Rod Thorn (6) | Veterans Memorial Coliseum (Portland, Oregon); 1,533 | 1–4 |
| 6 | October 27 | @ Philadelphia | L 115–132 | Bob Rule (18) | Tom Meschery (12) | Bob Weiss (11) | The Spectrum; 4,352 | 1–5 |
| 7 | October 28 | @ St. Louis | L 109–116 | Tommy Kron (21) | Bob Rule (10) | Tommy Kron (6) | Kiel Auditorium; 5,218 | 1–6 |
| 8 | October 31 | Chicago | W 114–104 | Walt Hazzard (34) | Dorie Murrey (17) | Bob Weiss (9) | Seattle Center Coliseum; 3,109 | 2–6 |

November: 5–11 (home: 3–1; road: 2–10)

| Game | Date | Team | Score | High points | High rebounds | High assists | Location Attendance | Record |
|---|---|---|---|---|---|---|---|---|
| 9 | November 1 | San Diego | L 125–139 | Al Tucker (23) | Al Tucker (14) | Bob Weiss (9) | Veterans Memorial Coliseum (Portland, Oregon); 2,593 | 2–7 |
| 10 | November 2 | Chicago | L 105–109 | Bob Rule (27) | Al Tucker (13) | Walt Hazzard (5) | Spokane Coliseum; 1,051 | 2–8 |
| 11 | November 3 | New York | L 100–134 | Walt Hazzard (19) | Al Tucker (13) | Tom Meschery (8) | Seattle Center Coliseum; 4,654 | 2–9 |
| 12 | November 7 | @ San Francisco | L 112–126 | Bob Weiss (20) | Tommy Kron (10) | Walt Hazzard (7) | Oakland–Alameda County Coliseum Arena; 3,168 | 2–10 |
| 13 | November 8 | @ St. Louis | L 96–111 | Walt Hazzard (20) | George Wilson (21) | Bob Weiss (5) | Kiel Auditorium; 3,022 | 2–11 |
| 14 | November 9 | vs. Detroit | L 118–119 | Walt Hazzard (33) | Bob Rule (17) | Walt Hazzard (7) | Madison Square Garden | 2–12 |
| 15 | November 11 | @ Baltimore | L 129–134 | Walt Hazzard (26) | Tom Meschery (11) | Tommy Kron (6) | Baltimore Civic Center; 4,685 | 2–13 |
| 16 | November 14 | vs. Boston | L 111–114 | Bob Weiss (29) | Walt Hazzard (10) | Walt Hazzard (6) | Madison Square Garden | 2–14 |
| 17 | November 17 | San Diego | W 130–124 | Walt Hazzard (30) | Tom Meschery (19) | Tommy Kron (10) | Seattle Center Coliseum; 4,162 | 3–14 |
| 18 | November 19 | Detroit | W 132–130 (OT) | Bob Rule (31) | Bob Rule (21) | Walt Hazzard (15) | Seattle Center Coliseum; 4,468 | 4–14 |
| 19 | November 20 | Detroit | L 118–120 | Bob Weiss (27) | Bob Rule, Tom Meschery (13) | Tommy Kron (6) | Puget Sound Fieldhouse; 2,311 | 4–15 |
| 20 | November 21 | Los Angeles | W 137–132 | Bob Rule (47) | Tom Meschery (17) | Walt Hazzard (9) | Seattle Center Coliseum; 8,122 | 5–15 |
| 21 | November 23 | vs. Boston | W 133–106 | Bob Rule (26) | Bob Rule, Tom Meschery (11) | Walt Hazzard (14) | The Spectrum | 6–15 |
| 22 | November 25 | Cincinnati | L 133–153 | Walt Hazzard (19) | Tom Meschery (13) | Rod Thorn (6) | Cleveland Arena; 3,455 | 6–16 |
| 23 | November 25 | @ New York | L 110–111 | Walt Hazzard (21) | Tom Meschery (16) | Tom Meschery (5) | Madison Square Garden; 9,011 | 6–17 |
| 24 | November 28 | @ Chicago | W 111–108 | Three players (20) | Tom Meschery (14) | Walt Hazzard (7) | Chicago Stadium; 1,659 | 7–17 |

December: 4–14 (home: 2–8; road: 2–6)

| Game | Date | Team | Score | High points | High rebounds | High assists | Location Attendance | Record |
|---|---|---|---|---|---|---|---|---|
| 25 | December 1 | vs. Philadelphia | L 109–133 | Bob Rule (29) | Tom Meschery (18) | Walt Hazzard (10) | Boston Garden | 7–18 |
| 26 | December 3 | St. Louis | L 109–123 | Tom Meschery (23) | Tom Meschery (11) | Bob Weiss (7) | Seattle Center Coliseum; 7,938 | 7–19 |
| 27 | December 5 | @ San Francisco | L 121–133 | Walt Hazzard (29) | George Wilson (12) | Bob Weiss (8) | Oakland–Alameda County Coliseum Arena; 2,306 | 7–20 |
| 28 | December 8 | Chicago | L 114–115 | Walt Hazzard, Bob Rule (21) | Tom Meschery (12) | Walt Hazzard (6) | Seattle Center Coliseum; 3,835 | 7–21 |
| 29 | December 10 | Los Angeles | W 133–123 | Al Tucker (35) | Tom Meschery (16) | Walt Hazzard (7) | Seattle Center Coliseum; 7,006 | 8–21 |
| 30 | December 12 | vs. Philadelphia | L 107–118 | Al Tucker (27) | Three players (10) | Walt Hazzard (6) | Madison Square Garden | 8–22 |
| 31 | December 15 | @ Chicago | W 122–115 | Walt Hazzard (36) | Dorie Murrey (11) | Walt Hazzard (6) | Chicago Stadium; 1,686 | 9–22 |
| 32 | December 17 | Philadelphia | L 124–139 | Rod Thorn (22) | Tom Meschery, Al Tucker (11) | Bob Weiss (10) | Seattle Center Coliseum; 11,294 | 9–23 |
| 33 | December 18 | Detroit | L 122–140 | Rod Thorn (29) | Bob Rule (17) | Rod Thorn (7) | Puget Sound Fieldhouse; 1,658 | 9–24 |
| 34 | December 19 | Boston | L 114–118 | Walt Hazzard (37) | Bob Rule, George Wilson (10) | Walt Hazzard (5) | Seattle Center Coliseum; 6,889 | 9–25 |
| 35 | December 20 | Philadelphia | L 122–160 | Walt Hazzard (20) | Dorie Murrey (10) | Walt Hazzard (5) | Seattle Center Coliseum; 7,714 | 9–26 |
| 36 | December 22 | New York | W 120–108 | Al Tucker (31) | Bob Rule (27) | Tommy Kron. Walt Hazzard (8) | Seattle Center Coliseum; 8,515 | 10–26 |
| 37 | December 23 | @ San Francisco | L 124–131 | Walt Hazzard (19) | Dorie Murrey (8) | Tommy Kron (7) | Oakland–Alameda County Coliseum Arena; 3,862 | 10–27 |
| 38 | December 24 | San Francisco | L 113–127 | Walt Hazzard (20) | Dorie Murrey (13) | Tom Meschery, Plummer Lott (6) | Seattle Center Coliseum; 6,226 | 10–28 |
| 39 | December 25 | @ Cincinnati | L 112–118 | Rod Thorn (26) | Dorie Murrey (17) | Bob Weiss (7) | Cincinnati Gardens; 3,323 | 10–29 |
| 40 | December 26 | vs. New York | W 137–135 | Walt Hazzard (37) | Three players (8) | Walt Hazzard (7) | The Spectrum (Philadelphia) | 11–29 |
| 41 | December 28 | San Diego | L 125–143 | Walt Hazzard (45) | Tom Meschery (16) | Walt Hazzard, Tommy Kron (8) | Seattle Center Coliseum; 5,889 | 11–30 |
| 42 | December 31 | San Francisco | L 124–126 | Walt Hazzard (26) | Tom Meschery (15) | Tom Meschery, Walt Hazzard (6) | Seattle Center Coliseum; 4,591 | 11–31 |

January: 5–7 (home: 1–3; road: 4–4)

| Game | Date | Team | Score | High points | High rebounds | High assists | Location Attendance | Record |
|---|---|---|---|---|---|---|---|---|
| 43 | January 1 | St. Louis | L 94–115 | Walt Hazzard (17) | Tom Meschery (16) | Walt Hazzard (5) | Seattle Center Coliseum; 3,604 | 11–32 |
| 44 | January 5 | Boston | L 121–128 | Bob Rule (31) | Bob Rule (16) | Walt Hazzard (11) | Hec Edmundson Pavilion; 9,188 | 11–33 |
| 45 | January 6 | @ San Diego | W 122–104 | Walt Hazzard (28) | Tom Meschery (11) | Tommy Kron (11) | San Diego Sports Arena; 6,738 | 12–33 |
| 46 | January 8 | New York | L 113–119 | Tom Meschery (24) | Bob Rule (16) | Tommy Kron, Walt Hazzard (6) | Seattle Center Coliseum; 4,548 | 12–34 |
| 47 | January 10 | @ Boston | L 110–123 | Walt Hazzard (24) | Tom Meschery (10) | Tommy Kron (4) | Boston Garden; 3,701 | 12–35 |
| 48 | January 15 | vs. New York | W 129–113 | Walt Hazzard (24) | Tommy Kron (10) | Walt Hazzard (9) | Boston Garden | 13–35 |
| 49 | January 16 | vs. Baltimore | W 142–116 | Tom Meschery (33) | Bob Rule (13) | Walt Hazzard (9) | Chicago Stadium; 3,500 | 14–35 |
| 50 | January 19 | @ Detroit | L 119–133 | Walt Hazzard (41) | Tom Meschery (9) | Walt Hazzard, Tommy Kron (6) | Cobo Arena; 5,887 | 14–36 |
| 51 | January 20 | @ St. Louis | L 115–120 | Walt Hazzard (25) | Tom Meschery (8) | Walt Hazzard (7) | Kiel Auditorium; 5,118 | 14–37 |
| 52 | January 21 | @ Los Angeles | L 123–154 | Walt Hazzard (24) | Tom Meschery (11) | Walt Hazzard, Tommy Kron (5) | The Forum; 9,262 | 14–38 |
| 53 | January 28 | Baltimore | W 135–126 | Walt Hazzard (23) | Al Tucker (13) | Tommy Kron (9) | Puget Sound Fieldhouse; 3,181 | 15–38 |
| 54 | January 30 | Los Angeles | W 128–116 | Walt Hazzard (31) | Tom Meschery (14) | Walt Hazzard (10) | Seattle Center Coliseum; 6,262 | 16–38 |

February: 4–10 (home: 2–2; road: 2–8)

| Game | Date | Team | Score | High points | High rebounds | High assists | Location Attendance | Record |
|---|---|---|---|---|---|---|---|---|
| 55 | February 1 | St. Louis | L 110–113 | Rod Thorn (32) | Bob Rule, George Wilson (12) | Walt Hazzard (6) | Seattle Center Coliseum; 5,564 | 16–39 |
| 56 | February 2 | @ Los Angeles | L 113–151 | Walt Hazzard, Bob Rule (17) | Bob Rule (11) | Walt Hazzard, Rod Thorn (4) | The Forum; 12,021 | 16–40 |
| 57 | February 4 | @ Los Angeles | L 131–137 | Tom Meschery (28) | Tom Meschery (12) | Walt Hazzard, Walt Hazzard (5) | The Forum; 7,796 | 16–41 |
| 58 | February 5 | vs. Cincinnati | W 132–129 (OT) | Walt Hazzard (45) | Tom Meschery (11) | Walt Hazzard (7) | Arizona Veterans Memorial Coliseum; 4,680 | 17–41 |
| 59 | February 8 | Los Angeles | W 115–110 | Walt Hazzard (31) | George Wilson (19) | Rod Thorn (9) | Seattle Center Coliseum; 6,526 | 18–41 |
| 60 | February 11 | San Francisco | W 146–118 | Walt Hazzard (29) | Al Tucker (15) | Walt Hazzard (9) | Seattle Center Coliseum; 9,505 | 19–41 |
| 61 | February 14 | Philadelphia | L 125–149 | Walt Hazzard (25) | Tom Meschery (10) | Rod Thorn (11) | Hec Edmundson Pavilion; 9,449 | 19–42 |
| 62 | February 15 | @ Cincinnati | L 119–132 | Walt Hazzard (31) | Dorie Murrey (11) | Walt Hazzard (6) | Cincinnati Gardens; 2,306 | 19–43 |
| 63 | February 16 | @ Baltimore | L 118–147 | Walt Hazzard (30) | Tom Meschery (11) | Bob Weiss (7) | Baltimore Civic Center; 3,748 | 19–44 |
| 64 | February 17 | @ New York | L 111–134 | Bob Weiss (22) | Bob Rule (9) | Bob Weiss (6) | Madison Square Garden; 13,256 | 19–45 |
| 65 | February 20 | @ Philadelphia | L 108–140 | Walt Hazzard (25) | Bud Olsen (9) | Rod Thorn (6) | The Spectrum; 6,417 | 19–46 |
| 66 | February 21 | vs. Chicago | L 106–108 | Walt Hazzard, Rod Thorn (25) | Tom Meschery (14) | Rod Thorn (9) | Baltimore Civic Center | 19–47 |
| 67 | February 23 | @ San Diego | W 127–122 | Walt Hazzard (31) | Bob Rule (13) | Walt Hazzard (11) | San Diego Sports Arena; 4,834 | 20–47 |
| 68 | February 24 | vs. Boston | L 137–141 | Walt Hazzard (38) | Bob Rule (18) | Walt Hazzard (5) | Pacific Coliseum (Vancouver); 8,129 | 20–48 |

March: 3–11 (home: 1–5; road: 2–6)

| Game | Date | Team | Score | High points | High rebounds | High assists | Location Attendance | Record |
|---|---|---|---|---|---|---|---|---|
| 69 | March 2 | @ Los Angeles | L 121–127 | Walt Hazzard (31) | Bob Rule (15) | Walt Hazzard, Bob Weiss (8) | The Forum; 11,335 | 20–49 |
| 70 | March 3 | Cincinnati | L 128–138 | Rod Thorn (22) | Dorie Murrey, George Wilson (11) | Walt Hazzard (5) | Seattle Center Coliseum; 8,894 | 20–50 |
| 71 | March 5 | Baltimore | L 121–126 | Tommy Kron (27) | George Wilson (16) | Bob Weiss (7) | Seattle Center Coliseum; 4,939 | 20–51 |
| 72 | March 7 | St. Louis | L 133–150 | Walt Hazzard, Rod Thorn (29) | George Wilson (11) | Walt Hazzard (8) | Veterans Memorial Coliseum (Portland, Oregon); 2,428 | 20–52 |
| 73 | March 8 | Baltimore | L 116–122 | Tom Meschery (30) | Al Tucker (14) | Rod Thorn (7) | Marcus Pavilion (Olympia, WA); 4,012 | 20–53 |
| 74 | March 9 | @ San Diego | W 115–111 | Tom Meschery (23) | Tom Meschery (16) | Bob Weiss (10) | San Diego Sports Arena; 6,331 | 21–53 |
| 75 | March 10 | San Francisco | L 112–118 | Al Tucker (28) | Bob Rule (15) | Bob Weiss (9) | Seattle Center Coliseum; 5,536 | 21–54 |
| 76 | March 11 | Boston | L 112–119 | Tom Meschery (22) | Bob Rule (15) | Bob Weiss (8) | Seattle Center Coliseum; 8,136 | 21–55 |
| 77 | March 12 | @ Detroit | L 123–139 | Tommy Kron (24) | George Wilson (10) | Bob Weiss (7) | Cobo Arena; 5,304 | 21–56 |
| 78 | March 13 | @ Cincinnati | L 123–142 | Bob Rule (46) | Tommy Kron (8) | Tommy Kron (12) | Cincinnati Gardens; 4,958 | 21–57 |
| 79 | March 15 | @ Chicago | W 113–101 | Walt Hazzard (21) | Tommy Kron, Tom Meschery (11) | Three players (3) | Chicago Stadium; 3,426 | 22–57 |
| 80 | March 16 | @ St. Louis | L 106–124 | Walt Hazzard (24) | Tom Meschery (12) | Walt Hazzard (11) | Kiel Auditorium; 7,665 | 22–58 |
| 81 | March 18 | Detroit | L 82–88 | Walt Hazzard (22) | Tom Meschery (18) | Walt Hazzard (5) | Seattle Center Coliseum; 6,244 | 22–59 |
| 82 | March 19 | Chicago | W 122–104 | Walt Hazzard (36) | Bob Rule (15) | Walt Hazzard (10) | Seattle Center Coliseum; 10,429 | 23–59 |

1967–68 schedule

== Player statistics ==
Legend
| GP | Games played | GS | Games started | MPG | Minutes per game |
| FG% | Field-goal percentage | 3P% | 3-point field-goal percentage | FT% | Free-throw percentage |
| RPG | Rebounds per game | APG | Assists per game | SPG | Steals per game |
| BPG | Blocks per game | PPG | Points per game |

| Player | GP | GS | MPG | FG% | 3FG% | FT% | RPG | APG | SPG | BPG | PPG |
|---|---|---|---|---|---|---|---|---|---|---|---|
| Henry Akin | 36 | – | 7.2 | .336 | – | .645 | 1.6 | .4 | – | – | 3.1 |
| Walt Hazzard | 79 | – | 33.7 | .441 | – | .774 | 4.2 | 6.2 | – | – | 24.0 |
| Tommy Kron | 76 | – | 23.6 | .396 | – | .790 | 4.7 | 3.7 | – | – | 9.7 |
| Plummer Lott | 44 | – | 10.9 | .311 | – | .613 | 2.1 | .8 | – | – | 2.5 |
| Tom Meschery | 82 | – | 34.8 | .469 | – | .707 | 10.2 | 2.4 | – | – | 14.5 |
| Dorie Murrey | 81 | – | 18.4 | .436 | – | .689 | 7.4 | .8 | – | – | 7.3 |
| Bud Olsen | 73 | – | 12.3 | .456 | – | .274 | 2.8 | 1.0 | – | – | 3.8 |
| Bob Rule | 82 | – | 29.6 | .489 | – | .658 | 9.5 | 1.2 | – | – | 18.1 |
| Rod Thorn | 66 | – | 25.3 | .451 | – | .737 | 4.0 | 3.5 | – | – | 15.2 |
| Al Tucker | 81 | – | 29.2 | .442 | – | .707 | 7.5 | 1.4 | – | – | 13.1 |
| Bob Weiss | 82 | – | 19.7 | .430 | – | .839 | 1.8 | 4.2 | – | – | 9.8 |
| George Wilson | 77 | – | 16.1 | .359 | – | .703 | 6.1 | .7 | – | – | 6.1 |

== Awards and records ==
- Al Tucker and Bob Rule earned NBA All-Rookie First Team selections
- Walt Hazzard played for the West in the 1968 NBA All-Star Game held at Madison Square Garden in New York City
