= Meschery =

Meschery is a surname. Notable people with the surname include:

- Joanne Meschery (born 1941), American fiction writer
- Matthew Meschery (born 1975), American vocalist and programmer
- Tom Meschery (born 1938), Russian-American basketball player
