= Mal Graham =

American basketball player (born 1945)

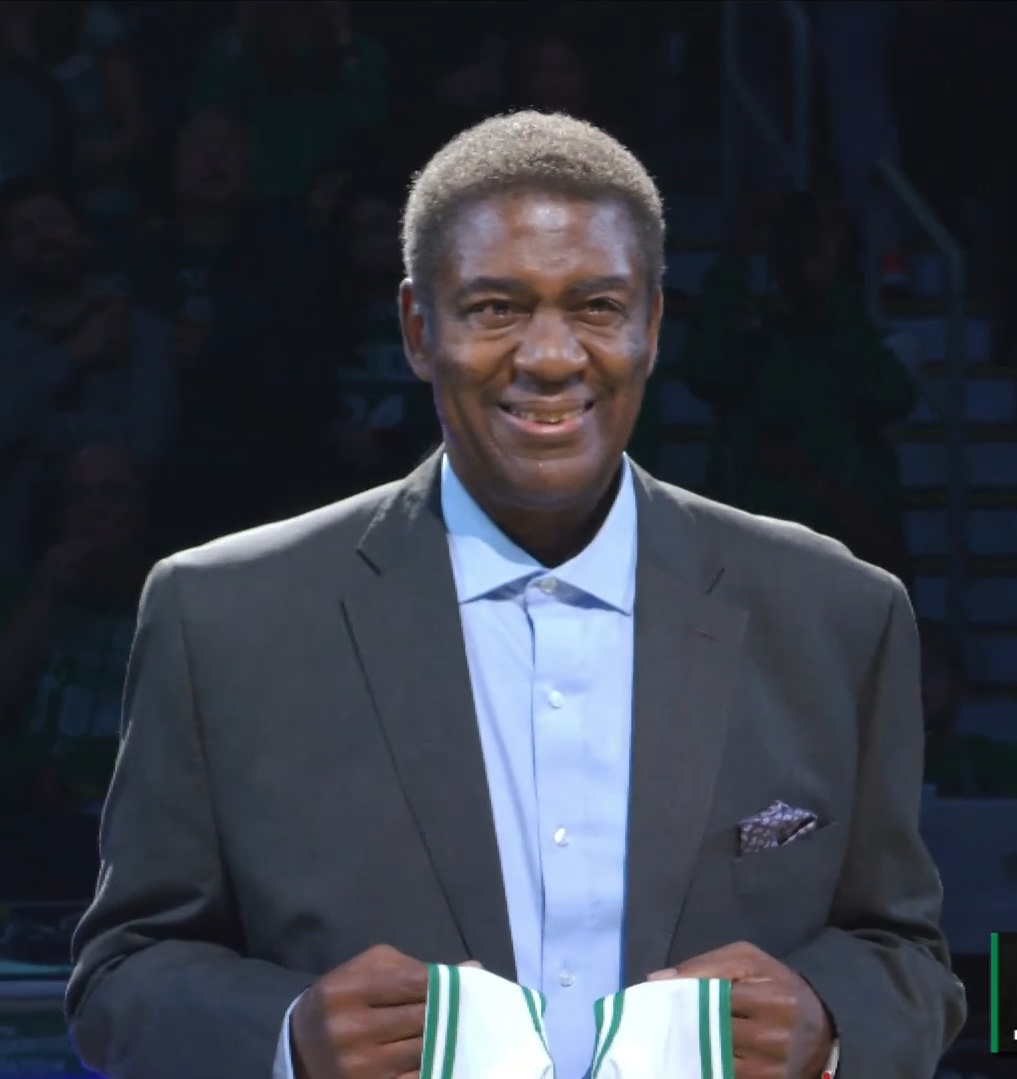
- Graham in 2022

Personal information
- Born: February 23, 1945 (age 81) Parrott, Georgia, U.S.
- Listed height: 6 ft 1 in (1.85 m)
- Listed weight: 185 lb (84 kg)

Career information
- High school: White Plains (White Plains, New York)
- College: NYU (1964–1967)
- NBA draft: 1967: 1st round, 11th overall pick
- Drafted by: Boston Celtics
- Playing career: 1967–1969
- Position: Point guard
- Number: 11

Career history
- 1967–1969: Boston Celtics

Career highlights
- 2× NBA champion (1968, 1969); Third-team All-American – UPI (1967)

Career statistics
- Points: 327 (4.7 ppg)
- Rebounds: 118 (1.7 rpg)
- Assists: 75 (1.1 apg)
- Stats at NBA.com
- Stats at Basketball Reference

Robert Malcolm Graham (born February 23, 1945) is an American former professional basketball player. He played two seasons in the National Basketball Association (NBA).

A 6'1" guard from New York University, Graham won two NBA championships as a member of the Boston Celtics from 1967 to 1969. He scored 327 points in his career.

Graham's career was cut short by a medical condition in the final two seasons of the Celtics championship run of the 1950s and 1960s, ending his playing career in 1969, at the same time as teammate Bill Russell. After retiring from basketball, he became a jurist, working as a lawyer specializing in civil litigation, labor, and administrative law. In 1982 he was named a judge in the Massachusetts court system, and served in several capacities as a judge until his retirement in 2015.

== Career statistics ==
Legend
GP	Games played	GS	Games started	MPG	Minutes per game
FG%	Field goal percentage	3P%	3-point field goal percentage	FT%	Free throw percentage
RPG	Rebounds per game	APG	Assists per game	SPG	Steals per game
BPG	Blocks per game	PPG	Points per game	**Bold**	Career high
†	Won an NBA championship

=== NBA ===
==== Regular season ====
Year	Team	GP	MPG	FG%	FT%	RPG	APG	PPG
1967–68†	Boston	**48**	**16.4**	**.430**	.636	**2.0**	**1.3**	**6.0**
1968–69†	Boston	22	4.7	.236	**.786**	1.1	.6	1.7
Career		70	12.7	.398	.657	1.7	1.1	4.7

==== Playoffs ====
Year	Team	GP	MPG	FG%	FT%	RPG	APG	PPG
1968†	Boston	**5**	**4.4**	**.400**	**.333**	**.8**	.2	**1.0**
1969†	Boston	2	1.5	.000	–	.0	**.5**	.0
Career		7	3.6	.286	.333	.6	.3	.7
