= Gary Gray (basketball) =

American basketball player (born 1945)

Personal information
- Born: February 23, 1945 (age 81) Fort Cobb, Oklahoma, U.S.
- Listed height: 6 ft 1 in (1.85 m)
- Listed weight: 185 lb (84 kg)

Career information
- High school: Fort Cobb (Fort Cobb, Oklahoma)
- College: Oklahoma City (1964–1967)
- NBA draft: 1967: 3rd round, 26th overall pick
- Drafted by: Cincinnati Royals
- Playing career: 1967–1968
- Position: Shooting guard
- Number: 15

Career history
- 1967–1968: Cincinnati Royals

Career statistics
- Points: 105
- Rebounds: 23
- Assists: 26
- Stats at NBA.com
- Stats at Basketball Reference

Gary Michael Gray (born February 23, 1945) is an American former basketball player who played as a guard in the NBA.

== Early years ==
Gary Gray was born in Fort Cobb, Oklahoma. Gray is Native American, of the Delaware Nation. Following graduation from Fort Cobb High School in 1963, he attended Oklahoma City University, where he led them to the All-College Tournament championship in 1966. His OCU Chiefs made the 1966 NCAA Men's Basketball Tournament.
Gray was named an Academic All American for 1966–1967 by the College Sports Information Directors of America (CoSIDA).

== Professional basketball career ==
Gray was drafted in the third round of the 1967 NBA draft by the Cincinnati Royals. He was also selected in the 1967 American Basketball Association Draft by the Dallas Chaparrals.
He spent the 1967–68 season with the Royals, averaging 2.4 points per game in limited playing time. He was later selected by the Milwaukee Bucks in the 1968 NBA expansion draft.

== Retirement ==
Gary Gray was inducted into the OCU Basketball Hall of Fame in 1986.

== Career statistics ==
Legend
GP	Games played	GS	Games started	MPG	Minutes per game
FG%	Field goal percentage	3P%	3-point field goal percentage	FT%	Free throw percentage
RPG	Rebounds per game	APG	Assists per game	SPG	Steals per game
BPG	Blocks per game	PPG	Points per game	**Bold**	Career high

=== NBA ===
==== Regular season ====
Year	Team	GP	MPG	FG%	FT%	RPG	APG	PPG
1967–68	Cincinnati	44	6.3	.366	.700	.5	.6	2.4
