= Plummer Lott =

American basketball player and judge (born 1945)

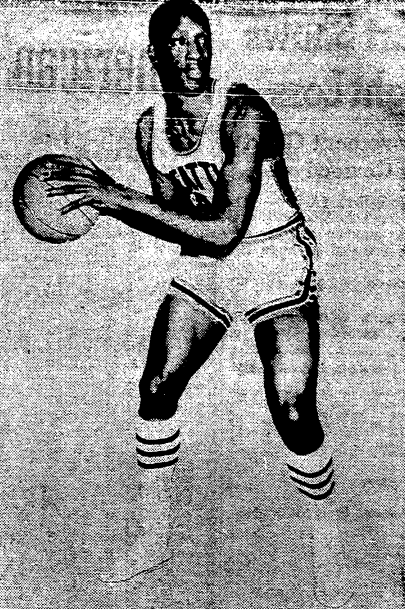

Personal information
- Born: December 11, 1945 (age 80)
- Listed height: 6 ft 5 in (1.96 m)
- Listed weight: 210 lb (95 kg)

Career information
- High school: Jim Hill (Jackson, Mississippi)
- College: Seattle (1964–1967)
- NBA draft: 1967: 5th round, 54th overall pick
- Drafted by: Seattle SuperSonics
- Playing career: 1967–1969
- Position: Small forward
- Number: 43

Career history
- 1967–1969: Seattle SuperSonics
- Stats at NBA.com
- Stats at Basketball Reference

Plummer E. Lott (born December 11, 1945) is a retired American professional basketball player and a New York Supreme Court justice.

Born in Mississippi, Lott was a 6-foot-5-inch (1.96 m) and 210-pound (95 kg) small forward whose brief NBA career lasted with the Seattle SuperSonics from 1967 to 1969. The former Seattle University star was selected by the expansion SuperSonics in the fifth round of the 1967 NBA draft.

== Judicial career ==
Following his NBA career, Lott attended the University of Washington School of Law, graduating in 1974. After several years working as an attorney in New York City, Lott was appointed in 1991 as a judge of the New York City Criminal Court. In 1995, he was elected to the New York State Supreme Court. From 1996 to early 2009, Lott served in the Criminal Branch of the Supreme Court in Brooklyn, presiding primarily over felony cases. One case which he presided over involved David Hampton, a con man who posed as film legend Sidney Poitier's son — a case that inspired the play Six Degrees of Separation, and a 1994 film adaptation of the same name.

In March 2009, New York Governor David Paterson appointed Lott as a justice of the Appellate Division of the New York Supreme Court, Second Department, based in Brooklyn.

== Career statistics ==
Legend
GP	Games played	GS	Games started	MPG	Minutes per game
FG%	Field goal percentage	3P%	3-point field goal percentage	FT%	Free throw percentage
RPG	Rebounds per game	APG	Assists per game	SPG	Steals per game
BPG	Blocks per game	PPG	Points per game	**Bold**	Career high

=== NBA ===
==== Regular season ====
Year	Team	GP	MPG	FG%	FT%	RPG	APG	PPG
1967–68	Seattle	**44**	**10.9**	**.311**	**.613**	**2.1**	**.8**	**2.5**
1968–69	Seattle	23	7.0	.258	.400	1.3	.3	1.6
Career		67	9.5	.294	.583	1.8	.6	2.2
