= Bill Dinwiddie =

American basketball player

Personal information
- Born: July 15, 1943
- Died: August 28, 2023 (aged 80)
- Listed height: 6 ft 7 in (2.01 m)
- Listed weight: 220 lb (100 kg)

Career information
- High school: Muncie Central (Muncie, Indiana)
- College: New Mexico Highlands (1962–1966)
- NBA draft: 1966: undrafted
- Playing career: 1967–1972
- Position: Small forward / power forward
- Number: 18, 27, 20

Career history
- 1967–1969: Cincinnati Royals
- 1970–1971: Boston Celtics
- 1971–1972: Milwaukee Bucks

Career statistics
- Points: 974
- Rebounds: 720
- Assists: 129
- Stats at NBA.com
- Stats at Basketball Reference

Rashid K. Shabazz (born William E. Dinwiddie; July 15, 1943 – August 28, 2023) was an American retired professional basketball player who played in the National Basketball Association (NBA). He started the 1966–67 season playing for the Columbus Comets of the North American Basketball League (NABL). Dinwiddie then signed as a free agent with the Cincinnati Royals in 1966 and began playing with the team in 1967. In 1969, he was traded to the Boston Celtics for Bob Cousy. He was later traded to the Milwaukee Bucks for a sixth-round draft pick. He converted to Islam in 1971 and changed his named to Rashid K. Shabazz. He married Raushanah Shabazz and had seven children. He died on August 29, 2023, at the age of 80.

== NBA career statistics ==
Legend
GP	Games played	GS	Games started	MPG	Minutes per game
FG%	Field goal percentage	3P%	3-point field goal percentage	FT%	Free throw percentage
RPG	Rebounds per game	APG	Assists per game	SPG	Steals per game
BPG	Blocks per game	PPG	Points per game	**Bold**	Career high

=== Regular season ===
Year	Team	GP	GS	MPG	FG%	3P%	FT%	RPG	APG	SPG	BPG	PPG
1967–68	Cincinnati	67	-	13.0	**.394**	-	.608	**3.5**	0.5	-	-	**5.1**
1968–69	Cincinnati	**69**	-	**14.9**	.352	-	.517	**3.5**	**0.8**	-	-	4.2
1970–71	Boston	61	-	11.8	.375	-	**.730**	3.4	0.6	-	-	4.9
1971–72	Milwaukee	23	-	6.3	.281	-	.556	1.4	0.4	-	-	1.6
Career		220	-	12.5	.369	-	.610	3.3	0.6	-	-	4.4
