= Al Jackson (basketball) =

American basketball player (born 1943)

Personal information
- Born: July 29, 1943 (age 83) Cleveland, Ohio
- Listed height: 6 ft 1 in (1.85 m)
- Listed weight: 185 lb (84 kg)

Career information
- High school: Benedictine (Cleveland, Ohio)
- College: Central State (1963–1964); Wilberforce (1964–1967)
- NBA draft: 1967: undrafted
- Position: Guard
- Number: 11

Career history
- 1967: Cincinnati Royals
- Stats at NBA.com
- Stats at Basketball Reference

Alvin Jackson (born July 29, 1943) is an American former professional basketball player. He played in the National Basketball Association for the Cincinnati Royals in two games at the start of the 1967–68 season.

Jackson started his collegiate career at Central State University, but then transferred and played out the remainder of his college days at Wilberforce University.

== Career statistics ==
Legend
GP	Games played	GS	Games started	MPG	Minutes per game
FG%	Field goal percentage	3P%	3-point field goal percentage	FT%	Free throw percentage
RPG	Rebounds per game	APG	Assists per game	SPG	Steals per game
BPG	Blocks per game	PPG	Points per game	**Bold**	Career high

=== NBA ===
==== Regular season ====
Year	Team	GP	MPG	FG%	FT%	RPG	APG	PPG
1967–68	Cincinnati	2	8.5	.000	–	.0	.5	.0
