= Dorie Murrey =

American basketball player (born 1943)

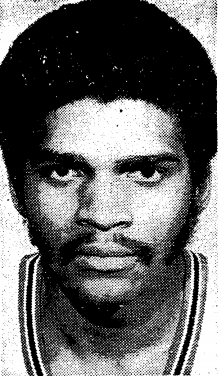

Personal information
- Born: September 7, 1943 (age 83)
- Listed height: 6 ft 8 in (2.03 m)
- Listed weight: 215 lb (98 kg)

Career information
- High school: Cass Technical (Detroit, Michigan)
- College: Detroit Mercy (1963–1966)
- NBA draft: 1966: 2nd round, 12th overall pick
- Drafted by: Detroit Pistons
- Playing career: 1966–1972
- Position: Power forward / center
- Number: 25, 41, 40

Career history
- 1966–1967: Detroit Pistons
- 1967–1970: Seattle SuperSonics
- 1970: Portland Trail Blazers
- 1970–1972: Baltimore Bullets

Career NBA statistics
- Points: 1,683 (4.7 ppg)
- Rebounds: 1,555 (4.4 rpg)
- Assists: 226 (0.6 apg)
- Stats at NBA.com
- Stats at Basketball Reference

Dorie S. Murrey (born September 7, 1943) is an American former professional basketball player. He was a 6-foot-8-inch (2.03 m), 215-pound (97 1/2 kg) power forward and he played collegiately at the University of Detroit Mercy. He has played in the National Basketball Association (NBA) from 1966 to 1972. He was originally selected with the second pick in the 2nd round of the 1966 NBA draft by the Detroit Pistons, his hometown team.

Murray was taken in two expansion drafts. In 1967, he was made available by the Pistons to be selected by the Seattle SuperSonics, and in 1970, he was made available by the Sonics to be selected by the Portland Trail Blazers. He was traded three games into the 1970–71 season, on October 10, 1970, by the Trail Blazers to the Baltimore Bullets in exchange for a 1971 2nd round draft choice (Rick Fisher). During his six-year NBA career Murrey averaged 4.7 points and 4.4 rebounds per game in 357 career games.

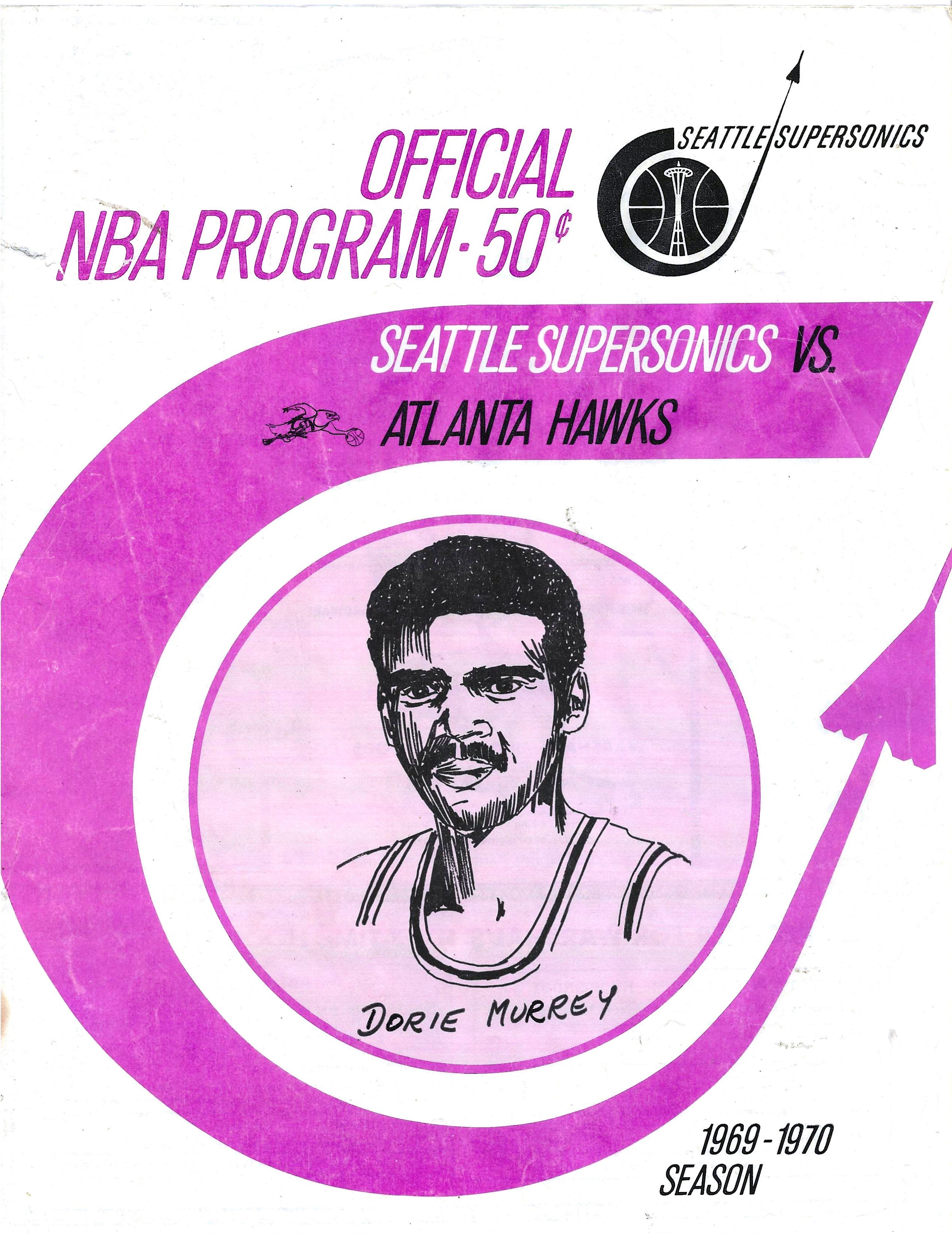

== Career statistics ==
Legend
GP	Games played	GS	Games started	MPG	Minutes per game
FG%	Field goal percentage	3P%	3-point field goal percentage	FT%	Free throw percentage
RPG	Rebounds per game	APG	Assists per game	SPG	Steals per game
BPG	Blocks per game	PPG	Points per game	**Bold**	Career high

=== NBA ===
==== Regular season ====
Year	Team	GP	MPG	FG%	FT%	RPG	APG	PPG
1966–67	Detroit	35	8.9	.402	.593	2.9	.3	2.8
1967–68	Seattle	**81**	**18.4**	.436	.689	**7.4**	.8	**7.3**
1968–69	Seattle	38	12.2	.387	.639	3.9	.6	5.6
1969–70	Seattle	**81**	13.3	.446	.731	4.4	**.9**	5.5
1970–71	Portland	2	10.0	.167	**.818**	3.5	.5	5.5
1970–71	Baltimore	69	10.1	**.448**	.653	3.1	.4	3.2
1971–72	Baltimore	51	8.3	.381	.615	2.5	.3	2.2
Career		357	12.6	.425	.679	4.4	.6	4.7

==== Playoffs ====
Year	Team	GP	MPG	FG%	FT%	RPG	APG	PPG
1971	Baltimore	**16**	**5.8**	**.481**	**.636**	**2.1**	**.1**	**2.1**
1972	Baltimore	1	1.0	–	–	.0	.0	.0
Career		17	5.5	.481	.636	1.9	.1	1.9
