= Tommy Kron =

American basketball player

Personal information
- Born: February 28, 1943 Owensboro, Kentucky, U.S.
- Died: November 29, 2007 (aged 64) Louisville, Kentucky, U.S.
- Listed height: 6 ft 5 in (1.96 m)
- Listed weight: 200 lb (91 kg)

Career information
- High school: Tell City (Tell City, Indiana)
- College: Kentucky (1963–1966)
- NBA draft: 1966: 3rd round, 24th overall pick
- Drafted by: St. Louis Hawks
- Playing career: 1966–1970
- Position: Shooting guard
- Number: 30, 11, 40

Career history
- 1966–1967: St. Louis Hawks
- 1967–1969: Seattle SuperSonics
- 1969–1970: Kentucky Colonels

Career NBA and ABA statistics
- Points: 1,351 (6.0 ppg)
- Rebounds: 672 (3.0 rpg)
- Assists: 605 (2.7 apg)
- Stats at NBA.com
- Stats at Basketball Reference

Thomas M. Kron (February 28, 1943 – November 29, 2007) was an American professional basketball player. A guard, Kron played his rookie season (1966–1967) with the St. Louis Hawks. He was drafted by the Seattle SuperSonics in the 1967 Expansion draft and spent two seasons there, and finished his career with the Kentucky Colonels of the American Basketball Association, becoming a fan favorite during the 1969 and 1970 seasons.

== High school career ==
Kron played for the legendary Orlando "Gunner" Wyman at Tell City High School (Tell City, Indiana); he led the Marksmen to 4 Sectional and 3 Regional titles; during his junior season (1960–61), he led them to the Indiana Final Four. The Marksmen lost their semi-final matchup to the Indianapolis Manual Redskins, starring the "Van Arsdale Twins", Dick Van Arsdale and Tom Van Arsdale. He was named All-State and an Indiana All-Star in 1962. Kron was inducted into the Indiana Basketball Hall of Fame in 2001.

== College career ==
Kron played college basketball at the University of Kentucky under legendary coach Adolph Rupp; he was a member of 2 SEC championship teams (1963–64, 1965–66). As a senior member of Rupp's Runts during the 1965–1966 season, he led Kentucky to the NCAA Championship Finals versus Texas Western, playing alongside such All-Americans as Pat Riley, Thad Jaracz and Louie Dampier.

Upon graduation from Kentucky, Kron had scored 719 points, grabbed 500 rebounds, and dished out 134 assists. In 1964–65 he was named both First Team All-Southeastern Conference by the coaches and Third Team by the AP. In 1965–66, he was named Third Team All-Southeastern Conference by the UPI.

== Professional career ==
In 1966, the St. Louis Hawks made him their 3rd-round pick; as a rookie, he averaged 2.1 points per game off the bench. He then moved to Seattle, following the 1967 NBA expansion draft, as a member of the SuperSonics and spent the next two seasons (1967–68 and 1968–69) coming off the bench and averaging 9.7 and 5.1 respectively. He then moved to the ABA rejoining his Kentucky teammate Louie Dampier in leading the Colonels to the playoffs.

== Death ==
Tommy Kron died of bladder cancer at age 64 on November 29, 2007. He is interred at Cave Hill Cemetery in Louisville, Kentucky.

== Career statistics ==
Legend
GP	Games played	GS	Games started	MPG	Minutes per game
FG%	Field goal percentage	3P%	3-point field goal percentage	FT%	Free throw percentage
RPG	Rebounds per game	APG	Assists per game	SPG	Steals per game
BPG	Blocks per game	PPG	Points per game	**Bold**	Career high

=== NBA/ABA ===
==== Regular season ====
Year	Team	GP	MPG	FG%	3P%	FT%	RPG	APG	PPG
1966–67	St. Louis	32	6.9	.310		.684	1.1	1.4	2.1
1967–68	Seattle	**76**	**23.6**	**.396**		.790	**4.7**	**3.7**	**9.7**
1968–69	Seattle	**76**	14.8	.392		.701	2.8	2.5	5.1
1969–70	Kentucky (ABA)	40	12.3	.374	.368	**.891**	1.7	2.2	4.0
Career (NBA)		184	17.1	.389		.753	3.3	2.8	6.5
Career (overall)		224	16.2	.387	.368	.768	3.0	2.7	6.0

==== Playoffs ====
Year	Team	GP	MPG	FG%	FT%	RPG	APG	PPG
1967	St. Louis	1	1.0	.000	–	.0	.0	.0
