= Tom Meschery =

American basketball player-coach (born 1938)

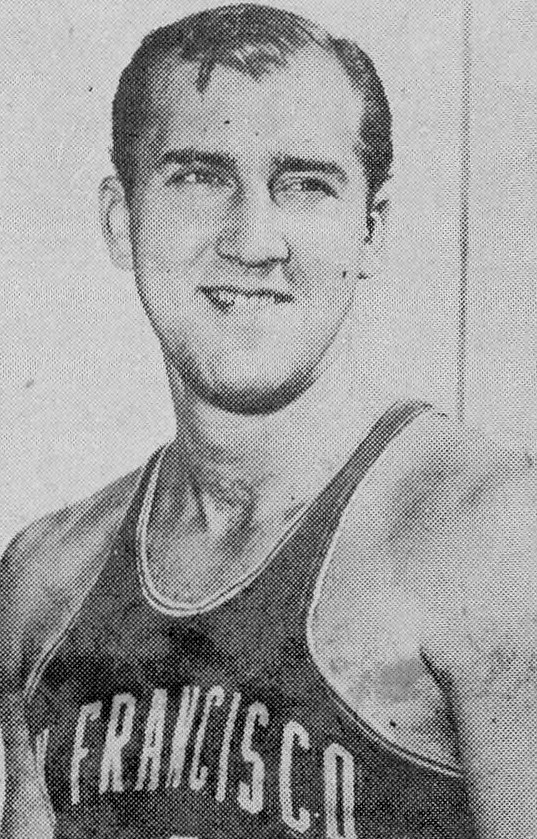
- Meschery with the San Francisco Warriors, c. 1965

Personal information
- Born: October 26, 1938 (age 88) Harbin, Manchukuo (Now Harbin, China)
- Listed height: 6 ft 6 in (1.98 m)
- Listed weight: 215 lb (98 kg)

Career information
- High school: Lowell (San Francisco, California)
- College: Saint Mary's (1958–1961)
- NBA draft: 1961: 1st round, 7th overall pick
- Drafted by: Philadelphia Warriors
- Playing career: 1961–1971
- Position: Power forward
- Number: 14
- Coaching career: 1971–1976, 1982–1983

Career history

Playing
- 1961–1967: Philadelphia/San Francisco Warriors
- 1967–1971: Seattle SuperSonics

Coaching
- 1971–1972: Carolina Cougars
- 1974–1976: Portland Trail Blazers (assistant)
- 1982–1983: Reno Bighorns

Career highlights
- NBA All-Star (1963); No. 14 retired by Golden State Warriors; First-team All-American – USBWA (1961); Third-team All-American – NEA (1961); Third-team All-American – NABC (1960); WCC Player of the Year (1961); 2× First-team All-WCC (1960, 1961); Second-team All-WCC (1959); No. 31 retired by Saint Mary's Gaels; First-team Parade All-American (1957); California Mr. Basketball (1957)

Career NBA statistics
- Points: 9,904 (12.7 ppg)
- Rebounds: 6,698 (8.6 rpg)
- Assists: 1,331 (1.7 apg)
- Stats at NBA.com
- Stats at Basketball Reference

Thomas Nicholas Meschery (/mɛˈʃɛərriː/ meh-SHAIR-ree; born Tomislav Nikolayevich Meshcheryakov (Russian: Томислав Николаевич Мещеряков); October 26, 1938) is an American former professional basketball player. Born in China to parents who had fled Russia, he spent his childhood in a Japanese internment camp during World War II before he moved to the United States with his family in 1946. Meschery was a power forward with a 10-year National Basketball Association career from 1961 to 1971. He played for the Philadelphia/San Francisco Warriors and the Seattle SuperSonics. Meschery played in the 1963 NBA All-Star Game as the first foreign-born NBA All-Star. After his playing retirement, he worked as a basketball coach and then a high school teacher. Meschery has written poetry, memoirs and novels.

== Early years ==
Meschery was born as Tomislav Nikolayevich Meshcheryakov in Harbin, Manchukuo. His parents were Russian emigrants who fled from the October Revolution in 1917. Meschery's mother worked for the American consulate in Harbin and aided in the release of White Russian soldiers imprisoned by the Chinese; one of them was Meschery's father, Nicholas Vasily Meshcheryakov, who was a family friend from Russia. Meschery's parents married in 1934. Through his maternal grandmother, Meschery is a descendant of the Tolstoy family and a direct relation of writers Leo Tolstoy and Aleksey Konstantinovich Tolstoy. His maternal grandfather, Vladimir Nikolaevich Lvov, was a Russian politician.

In 1939, Meschery's father moved to the United States so he could establish a home for his family in California. Meschery, his mother and his sister were supposed to emigrate the following year. However, their plans were disrupted by the outbreak of World War II as Meschery's family were taken from China by Japan and moved to an internment camp in Tokyo. Meschery spent his childhood in the camp and recalls experiencing the bombing of Tokyo.

After the war, Meschery and his family emigrated to the United States and were reunited with his father in San Francisco in 1946. It was also in this phase of his life where his father renamed the family "Meschery" due to the anti-Communist/anti-Soviet Red Scare under Joseph McCarthy, and Tomislav Nikolayevich was renamed Thomas Nicholas, which later was abbreviated to Tom. Meschery struggled to fit in with his classmates because of his accent and initial poor grasp of the English language. During a sixth grade kickball game, he was celebrated by his teammates for making a huge kick and "from that point on, [he] worked very hard to be an athlete." Meschery attended Lowell High School and was selected as a Parade All-American in 1957.

After graduating in 1957, he went to Saint Mary's College of California in Moraga. Meschery helped Saint Mary's reach the NCAA Tournament's Elite Eight in 1959. Two years later, he was chosen as a First Team All-American, and was named the West Coast Conference Player of the Year. He received his Bachelor of Arts degree in 1961.

== Professional playing career ==
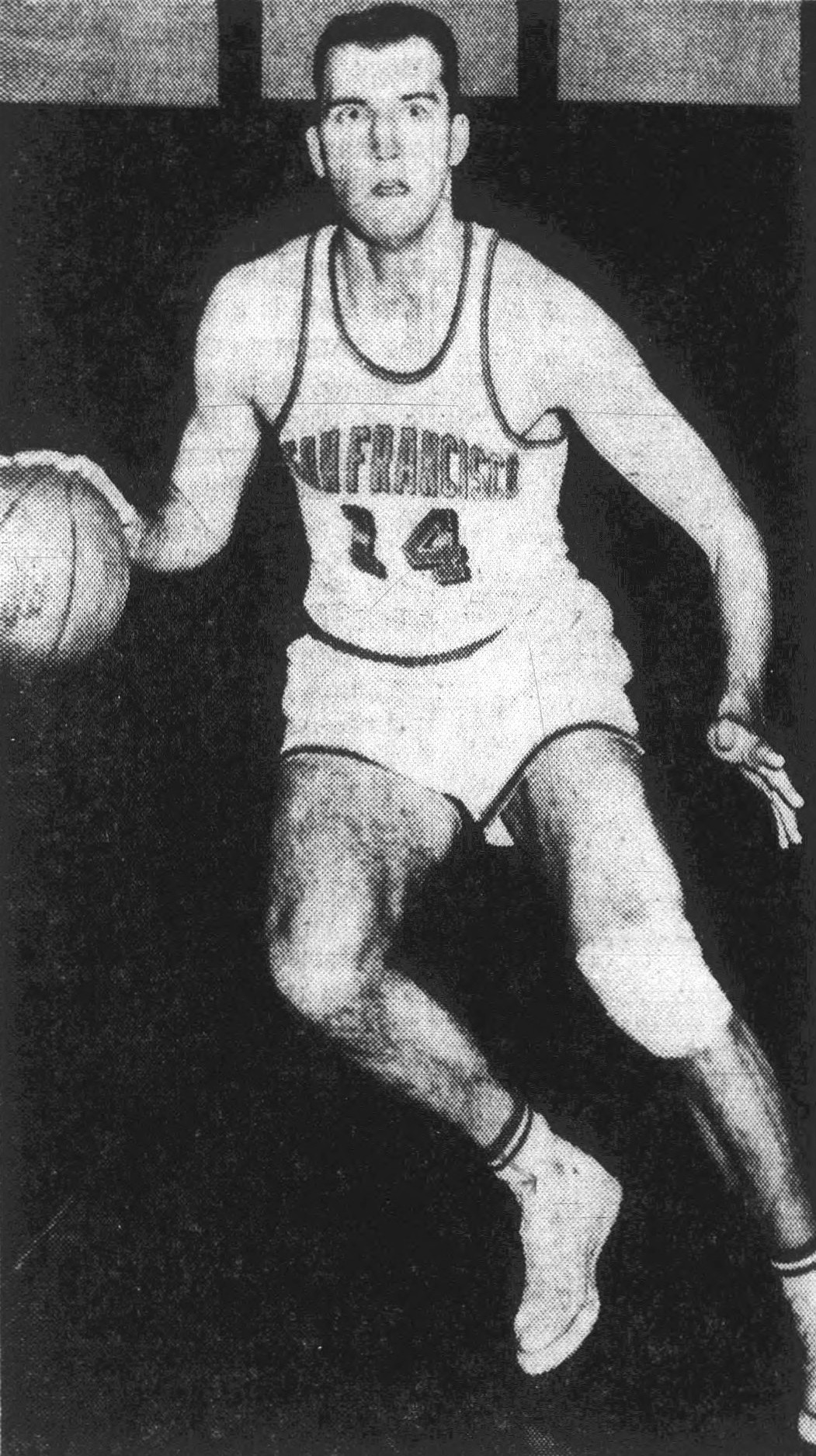
Meschery with the San Francisco Warriors in 1963

After graduating from St. Mary's, Meschery was drafted by the Philadelphia Warriors as the 7th pick overall in the 1961 NBA draft. Meschery was the starting forward on the 1961–62 Philadelphia Warriors team and played alongside Wilt Chamberlain when he scored scored 100 points; he wrote the poem "Wilt" about the moment. Meschery led the NBA in personal fouls in 1962. Meschery was nicknamed "The Mad Russian" during his playing career because of his hard-nosed style which included fights with other players.

Meschery became the first foreign-born player to play in an NBA All-Star Game when he was nominated in 1963. The following year, Meschery made his first Finals appearance, as the Warriors lost 4–1 to the Boston Celtics. Chamberlain left the Warriors in 1965, returning to his home town Philadelphia, to play with the 76ers. The Warriors however, strengthened by the arrival of Rick Barry, made it to the 1967 NBA Finals, in which they lost to Chamberlain's 76ers. After his second NBA Finals appearance, Meschery was selected by the NBA's Seattle SuperSonics during the 1967 NBA expansion draft.

In the SuperSonics' inaugural season, Meschery led the team in rebounds (10.2 per game) as well as personal fouls. He retired following the 1970–71 season, having played four seasons for the SuperSonics.

Meschery had his number 14 retired by the Warriors on the opening night of the 1967–68 season in his first game playing against them. He became the first player to have his number retired by the Warriors. The Warriors also gave him a unique honor by incorporating the number into the team's logo from 1967 to 1974. Meschery has been inducted into the San Francisco High School Hall of Fame; Saint Mary's College Hall of Fame (his college jersey #31 retired); and the Bay Area Sports Hall of Fame.

== Coaching career ==
After retiring as a player, Meschery joined the Peace Corps as a basketball coach in Venezuela but his position was dismantled after a few months. He was hired as head coach by the Carolina Cougars of the American Basketball Association (ABA) after being encouraged by the team's general manager, Carl Scheer. Meschery guided the Cougars to a record of 35–49 in the 1971–72 season before being replaced by Larry Brown. Meschery wrote a book about his experience, Caught in the Pivot: a Diary of a Rookie Coach in the Exploding World of Pro Basketball, which was published in 1973.

Meschery spent two seasons as an assistant coach for the Portland Trail Blazers under Lenny Wilkens from 1974 to 1976.

Meschery was the head coach for the Reno Bighorns of the Continental Basketball Association (CBA) during the 1982–83 season and led the team to an 18–26 record.

== Writing career ==
Meschery published his first book of poems in 1970, and returned to school after his coaching stint. His friend Mark Strand recommended him for the Iowa Writers' Workshop. Meschery received his Master of Fine Arts degree from the University of Iowa in 1974. After receiving his teaching credentials at the University of Nevada, Reno, Meschery taught high school English at Earl Wooster High School and Reno High School in Reno, Nevada, until his retirement from teaching in 2005. He is also a poet, whose works often relate to basketball, teaching, and being a Russian immigrant. In 2002, Meschery was inducted into the Nevada Writers Hall of Fame.

Meschery has written five books of poetry, two memoirs and six novels. He traces his love of writing to his Russian maternal ancestors, Alexei and Leo Tolstoy. Embarking on a new career as a novelist, Meschery has completed three novels in manuscript: Mr. Dolby's Dream, She's Got Game, and The Kid Has Hops and a young adult novel, also in manuscript, entitled The Society for the Prevention of Bullying. He has two published collections of poetry: Nothing We Lose Can Be Replaced and Some Men and Sweat: New and Selected Poems About Sports. Meschery and his wife Melanie are presently collaborating on a book of poems and art about saints.

Meschery maintains a blog, 'Meschery's Musings', which discusses a variety of controversial subjects relating to sports. Each blog ends with a sports poem. Meschery says he wishes to introduce the public to fine contemporary poems whose subject is sports in the same way Garrison Keillor makes poetry in general available to his listeners on his morning radio broadcasts.

== Personal life ==
Meschery lives in Sacramento, California, with his wife, artist Melanie Marchant Meschery. He was previously married to Joanne Meschery, with whom he has three children: Janai, Megan, and Matthew. Matthew Meschery is the former lead vocalist of OPM.

Meschery was diagnosed with multiple myeloma in 2005 and was told that he had only five years to live. His cancer has been in remission since 2008.

== NBA career statistics ==
Legend
GP	Games played	GS	Games started	MPG	Minutes per game
FG%	Field goal percentage	3P%	3-point field goal percentage	FT%	Free throw percentage
RPG	Rebounds per game	APG	Assists per game	SPG	Steals per game
BPG	Blocks per game	PPG	Points per game	**Bold**	Career high

=== Regular season ===
Year	Team	GP	MPG	FG%	FT%	RPG	APG	PPG
1961–62	Philadelphia	80	31.6	.404	**.824**	9.1	1.8	12.1
1962–63	San Francisco	64	**35.1**	.425	.728	9.8	1.6	**16.0**
1963–64	San Francisco	80	30.3	.458	.702	7.7	1.9	13.5
1964–65	San Francisco	79	30.5	.394	.751	8.3	1.3	12.7
1965–66	San Francisco	80	29.8	.448	.765	9.0	1.0	12.8
1966–67	San Francisco	72	25.6	.415	.717	7.6	1.3	10.6
1967–68	Seattle	**82**	34.8	.469	.707	**10.2**	**2.4**	14.5
1968–69	Seattle	**82**	32.6	.453	.736	10.0	**2.4**	14.0
1969–70	Seattle	80	28.7	**.482**	.790	8.3	2.0	12.3
1970–71	Seattle	79	23.1	.463	.750	6.1	1.4	9.3
Career		778	30.2	.441	.745	8.6	1.7	12.7
All-Star		1	8.0	.333	.500	1.0	1.0	3.0

=== Playoffs ===
Year	Team	GP	MPG	FG%	FT%	RPG	APG	PPG
1962	Philadelphia	12	**42.3**	.397	**.863**	**11.5**	**2.7**	**20.1**
1964	San Francisco	12	33.8	.442	.778	7.3	1.8	16.8
1967	San Francisco	**15**	27.2	**.451**	.761	7.9	1.7	12.9
Career		39	33.9	.428	.809	8.8	2.0	16.3

== Head coaching record ==
Team	Year	G	W	L	W–L%	Finish	PG	PW	PL	PW–L%	Result
Carolina	1971–72	84	35	49	.417	5th in Eastern	—	—	—	—	Missed playoffs
Career		84	35	49	.417		0	0	0	–	

== Works ==
- Over the Rim (1970), New York: McCall Publishing.
- Caught in the Pivot: a Diary of a Rookie Coach in the Exploding World of Pro Basketball (1973). Dell.
- Nothing We Lose Can Be Replaced (1999), Black Rock Press, University of Nevada, Reno.
- Some Men (2012), Black Rock Press, University of Nevada, Reno. Reno, Nevada.
- Sweat: New and Selected Poems About Sports (2015), Black Rock Press, University of Nevada, Reno. Reno, Nevada.
- The Case of the '61 Impala (2022), Camel Press, Kenmore WA.
- The Case of the '66 Mustang (2023), Camel Press, Kenmore WA.

Sporting positions
Preceded by Jerry Steele	Carolina Cougars Head Coach; 1971–1972	Succeeded by Larry Brown
