= Al Tucker =

American basketball player (1943–2001)

Personal information
- Born: February 24, 1943 Dayton, Ohio, U.S.
- Died: May 7, 2001 (aged 58) Dayton, Ohio, U.S.
- Listed height: 6 ft 8 in (2.03 m)
- Listed weight: 190 lb (86 kg)

Career information
- High school: Jefferson (Dayton, Ohio)
- College: Oklahoma Baptist (1964–1967)
- NBA draft: 1967: 1st round, 6th overall pick
- Drafted by: Seattle SuperSonics
- Playing career: 1967–1972
- Position: Small forward
- Number: 33, 23, 16, 35, 12

Career history
- 1967–1969: Seattle SuperSonics
- 1969: Cincinnati Royals
- 1969–1970: Chicago Bulls
- 1970–1971: Baltimore Bullets
- 1971–1973: The Floridians

Career highlights
- NBA All-Rookie First Team (1968); 2× NAIA tournament MVP (1966, 1967)

Career NBA and ABA statistics
- Points: 3,541 (10.1 ppg)
- Rebounds: 1,740 (4.9 rpg)
- Assists: 342 (1.0 apg)
- Stats at NBA.com
- Stats at Basketball Reference

Albert Ames Tucker Jr. (February 24, 1943 – May 7, 2001) was an American professional basketball player. Born in Dayton, Ohio, Tucker is sometimes credited with inventing the alley-oop with his brother Gerald while at Oklahoma Baptist University in Shawnee, Oklahoma.

== College records ==
With his brother Gerald, Al was recruited from Dayton to Oklahoma Baptist University, where he played three seasons. Although he played before the introduction of the 3-point shot, he set a number of records, some of which remain 50 years later. He had 27 rebounds in one game, 2,788 career points, 996 points in a season, 50 points in a game, a 31.1-point season scoring average, a 28.7-point career scoring average, 21 field goals in a game, 365 field goals in one season, 266 free throws in one season, 1,252 rebounds in a career, 467 rebounds in a season.

== Professional career ==
A 6'8" forward, Tucker played four seasons (1967–1971) in the National Basketball Association and one season (1971–1972) in the American Basketball Association as a member of the Seattle SuperSonics, Cincinnati Royals, Chicago Bulls, Baltimore Bullets, and The Floridians. He averaged 10.1 points per game in his career and earned NBA All-Rookie Honors at the end of the 1967–68 NBA season. Tucker is notable as the Seattle SuperSonics' first ever NBA draft pick, selected sixth overall in the 1967 NBA draft. Tucker was also selected in the 1967 ABA Draft by the Oakland Oaks.

== Personal ==
Tucker's father played for the Harlem Globetrotters in 1940.

== Career statistics ==
Legend
GP	Games played	GS	Games started	MPG	Minutes per game
FG%	Field goal percentage	3P%	3-point field goal percentage	FT%	Free throw percentage
RPG	Rebounds per game	APG	Assists per game	SPG	Steals per game
BPG	Blocks per game	PPG	Points per game	**Bold**	Career high

=== NBA/ABA ===
==== Regular season ====
Year	Team	GP	MPG	FG%	3P%	FT%	RPG	APG	PPG
1967–68	Seattle	**81**	**29.2**	.442		.707	**7.5**	**1.4**	**13.1**
1968–69	Seattle	56	22.5	.432		.637	5.7	1.0	10.3
1968–69	Cincinnati	28	22.4	.475		.671	4.4	.7	10.8
1969–70	Chicago	33	16.9	**.513**		**.822**	3.4	.9	7.0
1969–70	Baltimore	28	9.4	.510		.786	1.9	.3	4.7
1970–71	Baltimore	31	8.9	.452		.806	2.4	.2	4.2
1970–71	Florida (ABA)	14	23.6	.443	**.429**	.810	4.6	.9	12.1
1971–72	Florida (ABA)	81	22.2	.465	.366	.789	4.8	1.2	11.6
Career (NBA)		257	20.8	.453		.702	5.0	.9	9.5
Career (ABA)		95	22.4	.462	.371	.793	4.8	1.2	11.7
Career (overall)		352	21.2	.456	.371	.727	4.9	1.0	10.1

==== Playoffs ====
Year	Team	GP	MPG	FG%	3P%	FT%	RPG	APG	PPG
1970	Baltimore	4	1.3	**1.000**		–	.0	.0	1.0
1971	Florida (ABA)	**6**	**27.5**	.431	**.167**	**.826**	**5.3**	**2.0**	**12.7**
1972	Florida (ABA)	3	17.0	.250	.000	.000	4.7	1.3	3.3
Career (ABA)		9	24.0	.388	.143	.792	5.1	1.8	9.6
Career (overall)		13	17.0	.402	.143	.792	3.5	1.2	6.9
