= 1967–68 New York Knicks season =

Season of National Basketball Association team the New York Knicks

- Head coach: Dick McGuire; Red Holzman
- General manager: Eddie Donovan
- Arena: October–February: Madison Square Garden III; February–April: Madison Square Garden IV

Results
- Record: 43–39 (.524)
- Place: Division: 3rd (Eastern)
- Playoff finish: East Division semifinals (lost to 76ers 2–4)
- Stats at Basketball Reference

Local media
- Television: WOR-TV
- Radio: WHN

The 1967–68 New York Knicks season was the 22nd season for the team in the National Basketball Association (NBA). The team also hosted the 1968 NBA All-Star Game at the old Madison Square Garden.

Walt Frazier joined the Knicks' roster in time for the 1967–68 season, having been selected by the team in the first round of the 1967 NBA draft. Bill Bradley also made his Knicks debut in 1967. New York had an early season six-game losing streak and stood at 15–22 on December 27. The Knicks then replaced their head coach, hiring Red Holzman to fill the position. To begin 1968, they won six consecutive games and reached 33–33 by mid-February. With a 28–17 record in Holzman's 45 games as coach, the Knicks reached the playoffs. The Knicks and 76ers split the first four games of their playoff series, before Philadelphia won games five and six to end New York's season.

The season was also significant for the Knicks' move to the new Madison Square Garden. Their final game in the previous Garden was on February 10, a 115–97 win against the Philadelphia 76ers. They would then host their first game at the new Garden on February 14, a 114–102 win against the expansion San Diego Rockets.

In the regular season, the Knicks finished in third place in the Eastern Division with a 43–39 record, qualifying for the NBA playoffs for the second consecutive season. New York lost its opening round series to the 76ers, four games to two. Willis Reed scored 20.6 points per game and had 13.2 rebounds per game, leading the Knicks in both categories; Frazier had a team-high 4.1 assists per game.

== Draft picks ==
Note: This is not an extensive list; it only covers the first and second rounds, and any other players picked by the franchise that played at least one game in the league.

Round	Pick	Player	Position	Nationality	School/Club team
1	5	Walt Frazier	G	United States	Southern Illinois
2	17	Phil Jackson	F/C	United States	North Dakota
3	24	Gary Gregor	F/C	United States	South Carolina
12	128	Mike Riordan	F	United States	Providence

== Regular season ==
=== Season standings ===
Eastern Division	W	L	PCT	GB	Home	Road	Neutral	Div
x-Philadelphia 76ers	62	20	.756	–	27–8	26–12	9–0	29–11
x-Boston Celtics	54	28	.659	8	28–9	21–16	5–3	24–16
x-New York Knicks	43	39	.524	19	20–17	21–16	2–6	19–21
x-Detroit Pistons	40	42	.488	22	21–11	12–23	7–8	15–25
Cincinnati Royals	39	43	.476	23	18–12	13–23	8–8	18–22
Baltimore Bullets	36	46	.439	26	17–19	12–23	7–4	15–25

=== Game log ===
1967–68 game log
#	Date	Opponent	Score	High points	Record
1	October 17	San Francisco	122–124	Cazzie Russell (23)	1–0
2	October 18	@ Baltimore	98–121	Barnett, Reed (22)	1–1
3	October 21	Los Angeles	114–106	Willis Reed (30)	1–2
4	October 24	St. Louis	135–130 (OT)	Willis Reed (32)	1–3
5	October 25	@ Philadelphia	114–117	Willis Reed (24)	1–4
6	October 28	Detroit	111–98	Willis Reed (27)	1–5
7	October 31	@ San Francisco	103–108	Dick Barnett (19)	1–6
8	November 1	@ Los Angeles	129–113	Willis Reed (53)	2–6
9	November 3	@ Seattle	134–100	Willis Reed (24)	3–6
10	November 4	@ San Diego	125–121	Barnett, Russell (23)	4–6
11	November 5	@ San Diego	115–107	Dick Barnett (22)	5–6
12	November 8	@ Detroit	108–110	Willis Reed (28)	5–7
13	November 9	Cincinnati	106–123	Walt Bellamy (30)	6–7
14	November 11	Boston	105–110	Cazzie Russell (24)	7–7
15	November 14	San Diego	109–122	Willis Reed (27)	8–7
16	November 15	N San Diego	122–108	Dick Barnett (18)	8–8
17	November 18	Baltimore	101–93	Cazzie Russell (20)	8–9
18	November 21	Chicago	123–125 (2OT)	Walt Bellamy (26)	9–9
19	November 22	@ Cincinnati	122–123	Cazzie Russell (29)	9–10
20	November 23	N Chicago	96–106	Dick Barnett (26)	9–11
21	November 25	Seattle	110–111	Willis Reed (26)	10–11
22	November 28	Philadelphia	110–108	Dick Barnett (32)	10–12
23	November 29	@ Cincinnati	119–99	Willis Reed (18)	11–12
24	December 1	@ Chicago	100–102	Willis Reed (27)	11–13
25	December 2	Los Angeles	122–106	Willis Reed (23)	11–14
26	December 5	Baltimore	117–148	Walt Bellamy (28)	12–14
27	December 6	@ Boston	113–115	Reed, Russell (25)	12–15
28	December 8	@ Philadelphia	109–117	Dick Barnett (26)	12–16
29	December 9	Detroit	124–121	Dick Barnett (32)	12–17
30	December 12	St. Louis	145–142 (2OT)	Barnett, Bellamy (25)	12–18
31	December 13	@ Detroit	117–129	Walt Bellamy (27)	12–19
32	December 16	San Diego	102–126	Walt Bellamy (31)	13–19
33	December 19	Cincinnati	118–133	Willis Reed (29)	14–19
34	December 20	@ Los Angeles	138–131	Willis Reed (33)	15–19
35	December 22	@ Seattle	108–120	Dick Barnett (20)	15–20
36	December 25	Boston	134–124	Walt Bellamy (30)	15–21
37	December 26	N Seattle	137–135	Willis Reed (28)	15–22
38	December 27	Philadelphia	114–105	Walt Bellamy (27)	15–23
39	December 29	Los Angeles	126–115	Dick Barnett (23)	15–24
40	January 2	Cincinnati	125–119	Dick Barnett (30)	15–25
41	January 3	@ Philadelphia	129–115	Barnett, Bellamy (30)	16–25
42	January 5	N Chicago	121–99	Dick Van Arsdale (30)	17–25
43	January 6	Detroit	101–118	Walt Bellamy (32)	18–25
44	January 8	@ Seattle	119–113	Walt Bellamy (27)	19–25
45	January 9	@ San Diego	118–105	Willis Reed (24)	20–25
46	January 10	@ Los Angeles	115–101	Willis Reed (30)	21–25
47	January 12	@ San Francisco	117–127	Barnett, Reed (30)	21–26
48	January 15	N Seattle	129–113	Bellamy, Russell (20)	21–27
49	January 17	@ Baltimore	111–109	Cazzie Russell (30)	22–27
50	January 19	@ Boston	114–120	Dick Barnett (31)	22–28
51	January 21	@ Detroit	115–103	Cazzie Russell (42)	23–28
52	January 25	@ Chicago	126–118	Cazzie Russell (31)	24–28
53	January 26	@ St. Louis	94–103	Cazzie Russell (31)	24–29
54	January 28	San Francisco	130–133	Cazzie Russell (26)	25–29
55	January 30	Baltimore	134–131	Dick Barnett (26)	25–30
56	January 31	@ Cincinnati	128–126 (OT)	Walt Bellamy (23)	26–30
57	February 1	N Chicago	112–103	Walt Bellamy (25)	27–30
58	February 3	Boston	112–108	Dick Van Arsdale (23)	27–31
59	February 4	@ Boston	110–108	Walt Frazier (27)	28–31
60	February 6	St. Louis	100–121	Barnett, Bellamy (21)	29–31
61	February 7	@ Baltimore	114–111	Walt Bellamy (32)	30–31
62	February 9	@ St. Louis	111–121	Walt Bellamy (23)	30–32
63	February 10	Philadelphia	97–115	Walt Bellamy (24)	31–32
64	February 14	San Diego	102–114	Dick Barnett (26)	32–32
65	February 16	N Cincinnati	91–125	Willis Reed (16)	32–33
66	February 17	Seattle	111–134	Phil Jackson (24)	33–33
67	February 20	San Francisco	112–115 (OT)	Dick Barnett (32)	34–33
68	February 24	Chicago	101–109	Cazzie Russell (22)	35–33
69	February 25	@ Detroit	124–115	Cazzie Russell (38)	36–33
70	February 27	St. Louis	108–102	Dick Barnett (22)	36–34
71	February 28	@ Baltimore	126–122	Willis Reed (28)	37–34
72	February 29	N St. Louis	105–102 (OT)	Willis Reed (28)	37–35
73	March 2	Detroit	107–133	Cazzie Russell (30)	38–35
74	March 5	Boston	113–91	Dick Barnett (20)	38–36
75	March 6	@ Boston	91–103	Cazzie Russell (24)	38–37
76	March 10	Philadelphia	119–108	Willis Reed (22)	38–38
77	March 12	Baltimore	104–107	Willis Reed (30)	39–38
78	March 13	@ Philadelphia	130–120	Willis Reed (32)	40–38
79	March 15	@ Los Angeles	112–123	Willis Reed (26)	40–39
80	March 17	@ San Francisco	130–104	Walt Bellamy (26)	41–39
81	March 18	@ San Francisco	123–118	Willis Reed (29)	42–39
82	March 20	Cincinnati	106–108	Howard Komives (21)	43–39

== Playoffs ==
1968 playoff game log
Division semifinals: 2–4 (home: 2–1; road: 0–3)

Game	Date	Team	Score	High points	High rebounds	High assists	Location Attendance	Series
1	March 22	@ Philadelphia	L 110–118	Willis Reed (38)	Willis Reed (23)	Dick Van Arsdale (8)	Spectrum; 5,093	0–1
2	March 23	Philadelphia	W 128–117	Walt Bellamy (26)	Walt Bellamy (17)	Walt Frazier (7)	Madison Square Garden IV; 15,911	1–1
3	March 27	@ Philadelphia	L 132–138 (2OT)	Cazzie Russell (40)	Walt Bellamy (19)	Walt Frazier (9)	Spectrum; 6,951	1–2
4	March 30	Philadelphia	W 107–98	Walt Bellamy (28)	Walt Bellamy (13)	Howard Komives (8)	Madison Square Garden IV; 18,262	2–2
5	March 31	@ Philadelphia	L 105–123	Cazzie Russell (31)	Walt Bellamy (10)	Howard Komives (5)	Spectrum; 6,979	2–3
6	April 1	Philadelphia	L 97–113	Bellamy, Barnett (19)	Walt Bellamy (22)	Howard Komives (6)	Madison Square Garden IV; 18,014	2–4

1968 schedule

== Awards and records ==
- Willis Reed, All-NBA Second Team
- Walt Frazier, NBA All-Rookie Team 1st Team
- Phil Jackson, NBA All-Rookie Team 1st Team

== Bibliography ==
- Araton, Harvey (2011). When the Garden Was Eden: Clyde, the Captain, Dollar Bill, and the Glory Days of the New York Knicks. New York City: HarperCollins. ISBN 978-0-06-195623-2.
- Hahn, Alan (2012). New York Knicks: The Complete Illustrated History. MVP Books. ISBN 978-1-61058-684-9.
