= 1967–68 Baltimore Bullets season =

NBA professional basketball team season

- Head coach: Gene Shue
- Arena: Baltimore Civic Center

Results
- Record: 36–46 (.439)
- Place: Division: 6th (Western)
- Playoff finish: Did not qualify
- Stats at Basketball Reference

Local media
- Television: WTTG
- Radio: WBAL

The 1967–68 season was the Baltimore Bullets' 7th season in the league and fifth season in the city of Baltimore. After losing 61 games, the Bullets were forced to rebuild through the draft. With the first overall pick, the Bullets selected Earl Monroe. Monroe was a flashy player, a deft ball handler, and a creative, unconventional shot maker. He was the first player to make the reverse spin on the dribble a trademark move. In his rookie season he would lead the Bullets in scoring with 24.3 points per game, and win the Rookie of the Year Award. The Bullets improved by 15 games posting a 36–46 record. The Bullets would still finish in last place.

== Roster ==
1967–68 Baltimore Bullets roster
Players

Pos.	No.	Player	Height	Weight	DOB	From
PG	11	Johnny Egan	5 ft 11 in (1.80 m)	180 lb (82 kg)	January 31, 1939	Providence
C	44	LeRoy Ellis	6 ft 10 in (2.08 m)	210 lb (95 kg)	March 10, 1940	St. John's
PF	12	Bob Ferry	6 ft 8 in (2.03 m)	230 lb (104 kg)	1937-05-31	Saint Louis
SF	25	Gus Johnson	6 ft 6 in (1.98 m)	230 lb (104 kg)	December 13, 1938	Idaho
SG	22	Kevin Loughery	6 ft 3 in (1.91 m)	190 lb (86 kg)	March 28, 1940	St. John's
PF	35	Ed Manning	6 ft 7 in (2.01 m)	210 lb (95 kg)	January 2, 1944	Jackson State
SF	24	Jack Marin	6 ft 7 in (2.01 m)	200 lb (91 kg)	October 12, 1944	Duke
SG	40	Stan McKenzie	6 ft 5 in (1.96 m)	195 lb (88 kg)	October 6, 1944	NYU
SG	33	Earl Monroe	6 ft 3 in (1.91 m)	185 lb (84 kg)	November 21, 1944	Winston-Salem State
PG	10	Don Ohl	6 ft 3 in (1.91 m)	190 lb (86 kg)	April 18, 1936	Illinois
PF	31	Ray Scott	6 ft 9 in (2.06 m)	215 lb (98 kg)	July 12, 1938	Portland
G	15	Roland West	6 ft 4 in (1.93 m)	178 lb (81 kg)	June 6, 1944	Cincinnati
F/C	41	Tom Workman	6 ft 7 in (2.01 m)	218 lb (99 kg)	November 14, 1944	Seattle

Coaches
Head coach
- Gene Shue

Legend
- (DP) Unsigned draft pick
- (FA) Free agent
- (S) Suspended
- Injured

Roster

== Regular season ==
=== Season standings ===
Eastern Division	W	L	PCT	GB	Home	Road	Neutral	Div
x-Philadelphia 76ers	62	20	.756	–	27–8	26–12	9–0	29–11
x-Boston Celtics	54	28	.659	8	28–9	21–16	5–3	24–16
x-New York Knicks	43	39	.524	19	20–17	21–16	2–6	19–21
x-Detroit Pistons	40	42	.488	22	21–11	12–23	7–8	15–25
Cincinnati Royals	39	43	.476	23	18–12	13–23	8–8	18–22
Baltimore Bullets	36	46	.439	26	17–19	12–23	7–4	15–25

=== Game log ===
1967–68 game log
#	Date	Opponent	Score	High points	Record
1	October 18	New York	98–121	Jack Marin (24)	1–0
2	October 21	Boston	125–109	Ray Scott (27)	1–1
3	October 24	vs. Seattle	125–136	LeRoy Ellis (26)	2–1
4	October 25	@ San Diego	125–109	Monroe, Scott (27)	3–1
5	October 27	@ San Francisco	111–124	Gus Johnson (22)	3–2
6	October 29	@ Los Angeles	105–118	Kevin Loughery (21)	3–3
7	October 31	@ St. Louis	103–114	Gus Johnson (16)	3–4
8	November 1	@ Philadelphia	111–136	LeRoy Ellis (26)	3–5
9	November 3	Detroit	115–113	Gus Johnson (36)	3–6
10	November 4	@ Detroit	118–127	Don Ohl (37)	3–7
11	November 8	Cincinnati	100–122	Johnny Egan (26)	4–7
12	November 10	@ Boston	114–115	Ray Scott (27)	4–8
13	November 11	Seattle	129–134	Ray Scott (31)	5–8
14	November 14	San Francisco	129–123	Don Ohl (35)	5–9
15	November 17	Los Angeles	107–116	Gus Johnson (29)	6–9
16	November 18	@ New York	101–93	Jack Marin (22)	7–9
17	November 22	Chicago	105–100	Gus Johnson (24)	7–10
18	November 25	Boston	118–126	Don Ohl (32)	8–10
19	November 28	San Francisco	117–110	Gus Johnson (24)	8–11
20	December 1	Cincinnati	109–123	Don Ohl (27)	9–11
21	December 2	@ Philadelphia	121–130	Don Ohl (19)	9–12
22	December 5	@ New York	117–148	Gus Johnson (21)	9–13
23	December 6	Los Angeles	136–125	Jack Marin (27)	9–14
24	December 8	@ Boston	108–123	Don Ohl (26)	9–15
25	December 9	Philadelphia	123–109	Earl Monroe (29)	9–16
26	December 10	@ St. Louis	112–114 (OT)	Don Ohl (27)	9–17
27	December 12	Detroit	117–140	Kevin Loughery (35)	10–17
28	December 13	@ Cincinnati	108–136	Earl Monroe (24)	10–18
29	December 15	San Francisco	110–97	Loughery, Scott (20)	10–19
30	December 19	St. Louis	98–117	Earl Monroe (32)	11–19
31	December 21	@ Chicago	116–108	Earl Monroe (25)	12–19
32	December 22	Chicago	112–117	Earl Monroe (33)	13–19
33	December 25	Philadelphia	108–105	Kevin Loughery (21)	13–20
34	December 29	Cincinnati	113–130	Jack Marin (29)	14–20
35	January 1	@ Chicago	103–109	LeRoy Ellis (32)	14–21
36	January 2	vs. Detroit	114–113	Gus Johnson (33)	14–22
37	January 3	Chicago	113–94	Earl Monroe (27)	14–23
38	January 6	Los Angeles	127–130 (OT)	Earl Monroe (37)	15–23
39	January 9	vs. Cincinnati	118–121	Earl Monroe (37)	16–23
40	January 10	@ Cincinnati	117–133	Jack Marin (24)	16–24
41	January 11	St. Louis	108–101	Earl Monroe (32)	16–25
42	January 12	@ Philadelphia	116–133	Ray Scott (27)	16–26
43	January 13	@ Chicago	106–110	Kevin Loughery (26)	16–27
44	January 16	vs. Seattle	142–116	Earl Monroe (25)	16–28
45	January 17	New York	111–109	Earl Monroe (26)	16–29
46	January 18	vs. St. Louis	119–116	Don Ohl (32)	16–30
47	January 20	Boston	115–118	Gus Johnson (33)	17–30
48	January 25	@ San Diego	127–113	Earl Monroe (30)	18–30
49	January 26	@ San Francisco	125–110	Earl Monroe (35)	19–30
50	January 27	@ San Diego	123–122	Earl Monroe (34)	20–30
51	January 28	vs. Seattle	135–126	Earl Monroe (36)	20–31
52	January 30	@ New York	134–131	Earl Monroe (39)	21–31
53	January 31	Detroit	108–113	Earl Monroe (35)	22–31
54	February 2	@ Boston	99–120	Ray Scott (20)	22–32
55	February 3	Philadelphia	133–121	Earl Monroe (45)	22–33
56	February 4	@ Detroit	115–117	Earl Monroe (35)	22–34
57	February 5	vs. San Diego	108–121	Earl Monroe (32)	23–34
58	February 7	New York	114–111	Earl Monroe (30)	23–35
59	February 8	vs. San Diego	102–106	Earl Monroe (23)	24–35
60	February 10	@ Detroit	114–109	Earl Monroe (37)	25–35
61	February 11	San Diego	116–136	Gus Johnson (44)	26–35
62	February 13	Los Angeles	119–116 (OT)	Earl Monroe (56)	26–36
63	February 16	Seattle	118–147	Kevin Loughery (29)	27–36
64	February 17	@ Cincinnati	115–117	Earl Monroe (44)	27–37
65	February 20	vs. St. Louis	115–127	Earl Monroe (35)	28–37
66	February 21	San Francisco	117–126	Earl Monroe (29)	29–37
67	February 22	vs. Cincinnati	99–112	Ray Scott (26)	30–37
68	February 23	@ St. Louis	110–118	Earl Monroe (25)	30–38
69	February 24	Detroit	132–140	Earl Monroe (49)	31–38
70	February 28	New York	126–122	Earl Monroe (40)	31–39
71	March 1	@ San Diego	156–114	Ray Scott (25)	32–39
72	March 2	@ San Francisco	109–117	Earl Monroe (30)	32–40
73	March 3	@ Los Angeles	114–121	Earl Monroe (24)	32–41
74	March 5	@ Seattle	126–121	Gus Johnson (29)	33–41
75	March 8	vs. Seattle	116–122	Earl Monroe (33)	34–41
76	March 10	@ Los Angeles	119–89	Ray Scott (29)	35–41
77	March 12	@ New York	104–107	Earl Monroe (37)	35–42
78	March 13	Chicago	100–96	Jack Marin (23)	35–43
79	March 15	@ Philadelphia	115–122	LeRoy Ellis (29)	35–44
80	March 16	Boston	136–111	Earl Monroe (28)	35–45
81	March 17	@ Boston	147–139	LeRoy Ellis (32)	36–45
82	March 20	Philadelphia	137–119	Earl Monroe (46)	36–46

== Awards and honors ==
- Earl Monroe, NBA Rookie of the Year Award
- Earl Monroe, NBA All-Rookie Team 1st Team
