= Joanne Meschery =

American fiction writer (born 1941)

Joanne Meschery (born 1941 in Gorman, Texas) is an American fiction writer. She is the author of three novels: In a High Place (1981), A Gentleman's Guide to the Frontier (1990), which was nominated for a Pen/Faulkner Award, and Home and Away (Simon & Schuster, 1994), recently reprinted by the University of California Press as part of their California Writers Series. Joanne Meschery was married to former NBA player Tom Meschery.

Meschery, though born in Texas, spent her early childhood years in Boston, Massachusetts, and later moved with her family to Modesto, California. She attended high school in Fallon, Nevada. Her work has been awarded two grants from the National Endowment for the Arts along with numerous other prizes. She studied at the University of Iowa Workshop and was a Wallace Stegner Fellow at Stanford University. She taught creative writing at the University of Arkansas and now teaches English and creative writing at San Diego State University.

== Awards and honors ==
Joanne Meschery was inducted into the Nevada Writers Hall of Fame in 1999.
