= 1967–68 Cincinnati Royals season =

NBA professional basketball team season

- Head coach: Ed Jucker
- Owners: Louis Jacobs
- Arena: Cincinnati Gardens

Results
- Record: 39–43 (.476)
- Place: Division: 5th (Eastern)
- Playoff finish: Did not qualify
- Stats at Basketball Reference

Local media
- Television: WKRC-TV
- Radio: WLW

The 1967–68 Cincinnati Royals season was the Royals 20th season in the NBA and 11th season in Cincinnati.

== Roster ==
1967–68 Cincinnati Royals roster
Players

Pos.	No.	Player	Height	Weight	DOB	From
PF	17	Len Chappell	6 ft 8 in (2.03 m)	240 lb (109 kg)	1941–01–31	Wake Forest
C	24	Connie Dierking	6 ft 9 in (2.06 m)	222 lb (101 kg)	1936–10–02	Cincinnati
SF	18	Bill Dinwiddie	6 ft 7 in (2.01 m)	220 lb (100 kg)	1943–07–15	New Mexico Highlands
C	23	Jim Fox	6 ft 10 in (2.08 m)	230 lb (104 kg)	1943–04–07	South Carolina
SG	15	Gary Gray	6 ft 1 in (1.85 m)	185 lb (84 kg)	1945–02–23	Oklahoma City
PF	22	Happy Hairston	6 ft 7 in (2.01 m)	225 lb (102 kg)	1942–05–31	NYU
G	11	Al Jackson	6 ft 1 in (1.85 m)	185 lb (84 kg)	1943–07–29	Wilberforce
SF	21	Bob Love	6 ft 8 in (2.03 m)	215 lb (98 kg)	1942–12–08	Southern
PF	16	Jerry Lucas	6 ft 8 in (2.03 m)	230 lb (104 kg)	1940–03–30	Ohio State
PG	14	Oscar Robertson	6 ft 5 in (1.96 m)	205 lb (93 kg)	1938–11–24	Cincinnati
PG	20	Flynn Robinson	6 ft 1 in (1.85 m)	185 lb (84 kg)	1941–04–28	Wyoming
PG	5	Guy Rodgers	6 ft 0 in (1.83 m)	185 lb (84 kg)	1935–09–01	Temple
SG	10	Adrian Smith	6 ft 1 in (1.85 m)	180 lb (82 kg)	1936–10–05	Kentucky
PF	23	John Tresvant	6 ft 7 in (2.01 m)	215 lb (98 kg)	1939–06–07	Seattle
SF	17	Tom Van Arsdale	6 ft 5 in (1.96 m)	202 lb (92 kg)	1943–02–22	Indiana
C	13	Walt Wesley	6 ft 11 in (2.11 m)	220 lb (100 kg)	1945–01–25	Kansas

Coaches
Head coach
- Ed Jucker

Legend
- (DP) Unsigned draft pick
- (FA) Free agent
- (S) Suspended
- Injured

Roster

== Regular season ==
=== Season standings ===
Eastern Division	W	L	PCT	GB	Home	Road	Neutral	Div
x-Philadelphia 76ers	62	20	.756	–	27–8	26–12	9–0	29–11
x-Boston Celtics	54	28	.659	8	28–9	21–16	5–3	24–16
x-New York Knicks	43	39	.524	19	20–17	21–16	2–6	19–21
x-Detroit Pistons	40	42	.488	22	21–11	12–23	7–8	15–25
Cincinnati Royals	39	43	.476	23	18–12	13–23	8–8	18–22
Baltimore Bullets	36	46	.439	26	17–19	12–23	7–4	15–25

=== Game log ===
1967–68 Game log
#	Date	Opponent	Score	High points	Record
1	October 17	@ Detroit	108–131	Happy Hairston (27)	0–1
2	October 18	San Francisco	118–122	Oscar Robertson (41)	1–1
3	October 21	Chicago	107–109	Happy Hairston (30)	2–1
4	October 22	@ Seattle	106–94	Jerry Lucas (26)	3–1
5	October 24	@ San Francisco	106–116	Bob Love (29)	3–2
6	October 25	@ Los Angeles	116–132	Oscar Robertson (33)	3–3
7	October 27	@ San Diego	116–113	Jerry Lucas (26)	4–3
8	October 29	@ San Diego	108–99	Lucas, Rodgers (23)	5–3
9	November 1	St. Louis	101–96	Jerry Lucas (32)	5–4
10	November 4	Los Angeles	106–104	Connie Dierking (30)	5–5
11	November 7	Boston	113–103	Adrian Smith (27)	5–6
12	November 8	@ Baltimore	100–122	Happy Hairston (28)	5–7
13	November 9	@ New York	106–123	Jerry Lucas (41)	5–8
14	November 11	San Diego	108–109	Jerry Lucas (23)	6–8
15	November 14	@ Philadelphia	102–122	Jerry Lucas (19)	6–9
16	November 17	@ Boston	120–119	Happy Hairston (26)	7–9
17	November 22	New York	122–123	Oscar Robertson (40)	8–9
18	November 24	N Seattle	133–153	Connie Dierking (27)	9–9
19	November 25	Detroit	133–123	Jerry Lucas (36)	9–10
20	November 29	New York	119–99	Happy Hairston (20)	9–11
21	December 1	@ Baltimore	109–123	Jerry Lucas (27)	9–12
22	December 2	Chicago	126–110	Oscar Robertson (35)	9–13
23	December 5	N Chicago	104–105	Oscar Robertson (37)	9–14
24	December 6	Philadelphia	108–107	Oscar Robertson (31)	9–15
25	December 8	@ St. Louis	95–101	Lucas, Robertson (22)	9–16
26	December 9	Boston	104–108	Oscar Robertson (40)	10–16
27	December 13	Baltimore	108–136	Oscar Robertson (27)	11–16
28	December 15	N Detroit	130–147	Lucas, Robertson (31)	12–16
29	December 16	@ Detroit	122–110	Oscar Robertson (34)	13–16
30	December 19	@ New York	118–133	Oscar Robertson (27)	13–17
31	December 22	@ Boston	117–120	Oscar Robertson (36)	13–18
32	December 25	Seattle	112–118	Connie Dierking (31)	14–18
33	December 26	@ Philadelphia	121–126	Oscar Robertson (32)	14–19
34	December 27	Los Angeles	127–132	Oscar Robertson (34)	15–19
35	December 28	N San Francisco	122–126	Oscar Robertson (41)	16–19
36	December 29	@ Baltimore	113–130	Oscar Robertson (35)	16–20
37	January 2	@ New York	125–119	Oscar Robertson (34)	17–20
38	January 5	@ Detroit	141–142 (OT)	Oscar Robertson (43)	17–21
39	January 6	Chicago	114–109	Oscar Robertson (39)	17–22
40	January 7	Philadelphia	118–134	Jerry Lucas (34)	18–22
41	January 9	N Baltimore	118–121	Oscar Robertson (27)	18–23
42	January 10	Baltimore	117–133	Oscar Robertson (28)	19–23
43	January 11	N Boston	120–116	Oscar Robertson (40)	20–23
44	January 13	San Diego	116–122	Oscar Robertson (32)	21–23
45	January 16	San Francisco	121–148	Oscar Robertson (27)	22–23
46	January 18	N San Diego	126–129	Oscar Robertson (36)	23–23
47	January 20	Detroit	120–128	Oscar Robertson (32)	24–23
48	January 25	N Los Angeles	118–116	Oscar Robertson (33)	24–24
49	January 26	@ Philadelphia	113–123	Connie Dierking (33)	24–25
50	January 27	St. Louis	120–111	Oscar Robertson (27)	24–26
51	January 30	N Detroit	101–121	Oscar Robertson (35)	25–26
52	January 31	New York	128–126 (OT)	Oscar Robertson (42)	25–27
53	February 2	@ Chicago	125–113	Oscar Robertson (40)	26–27
54	February 3	St. Louis	125–111	Oscar Robertson (38)	26–28
55	February 4	@ St. Louis	100–106	Lucas, Robertson (23)	26–29
56	February 5	N Seattle	132–129 (OT)	Adrian Smith (28)	26–30
57	February 6	@ Los Angeles	102–146	Adrian Smith (21)	26–31
58	February 8	@ San Francisco	109–126	Lucas, Van Arsdale (20)	26–32
59	February 10	@ San Diego	101–99	Adrian Smith (24)	27–32
60	February 12	N Chicago	104–112 (OT)	Connie Dierking (33)	27–33
61	February 13	N St. Louis	123–111	Jerry Lucas (23)	27–34
62	February 15	Seattle	119–132	Oscar Robertson (32)	28–34
63	February 16	N New York	91–125	Oscar Robertson (32)	29–34
64	February 17	Baltimore	115–117	Oscar Robertson (24)	30–34
65	February 18	Boston	100–107	Oscar Robertson (30)	31–34
66	February 20	@ Boston	110–126	Adrian Smith (23)	31–35
67	February 22	N Baltimore	99–112	Jerry Lucas (28)	31–36
68	February 23	@ Los Angeles	115–131	Adrian Smith (26)	31–37
69	February 24	@ San Francisco	114–127	Connie Dierking (27)	31–38
70	February 27	@ Los Angeles	106–117	Jerry Lucas (31)	31–39
71	February 29	@ San Diego	120–114	Oscar Robertson (27)	32–39
72	March 1	@ San Francisco	122–101	Oscar Robertson (31)	33–39
73	March 3	@ Seattle	138–128	Connie Dierking (41)	34–39
74	March 6	Philadelphia	106–108	Oscar Robertson (35)	35–39
75	March 7	N Philadelphia	125–117	Oscar Robertson (35)	35–40
76	March 8	Detroit	129–118	Oscar Robertson (38)	35–41
77	March 10	@ Boston	137–111	Connie Dierking (36)	36–41
78	March 11	@ Chicago	98–104	Oscar Robertson (37)	36–42
79	March 13	Seattle	123–142	Oscar Robertson (36)	37–42
80	March 14	N St. Louis	96–102	Oscar Robertson (30)	38–42
81	March 19	@ Philadelphia	131–130 (OT)	Connie Dierking (41)	39–42
82	March 20	@ New York	106–108	Oscar Robertson (28)	39–43

== Awards and records ==
- Oscar Robertson, All-NBA First Team
