= 1967–68 Boston Celtics season =

NBA basketball team season (won championship)

- NBA champions
- Head coach: Bill Russell
- General manager: Red Auerbach
- Arena: Boston Garden

Results
- Record: 54–28 (.659)
- Place: Division: 2nd (Eastern)
- Playoff finish: NBA champions (Defeated Lakers 4–2)
- Stats at Basketball Reference

Local media
- Television: WKBG
- Radio: WHDH

The 1967–68 Boston Celtics season was their 22nd in the National Basketball Association (NBA). The Celtics won their tenth title in franchise history. Notably, Bill Russell won the first title led by a player-coach in NBA history.

== Draft picks ==
This table only displays picks through the second round.

Round	Pick	Player	Position	Nationality	College
1	11	Mal Graham	PG	United States	NYU

== Roster ==
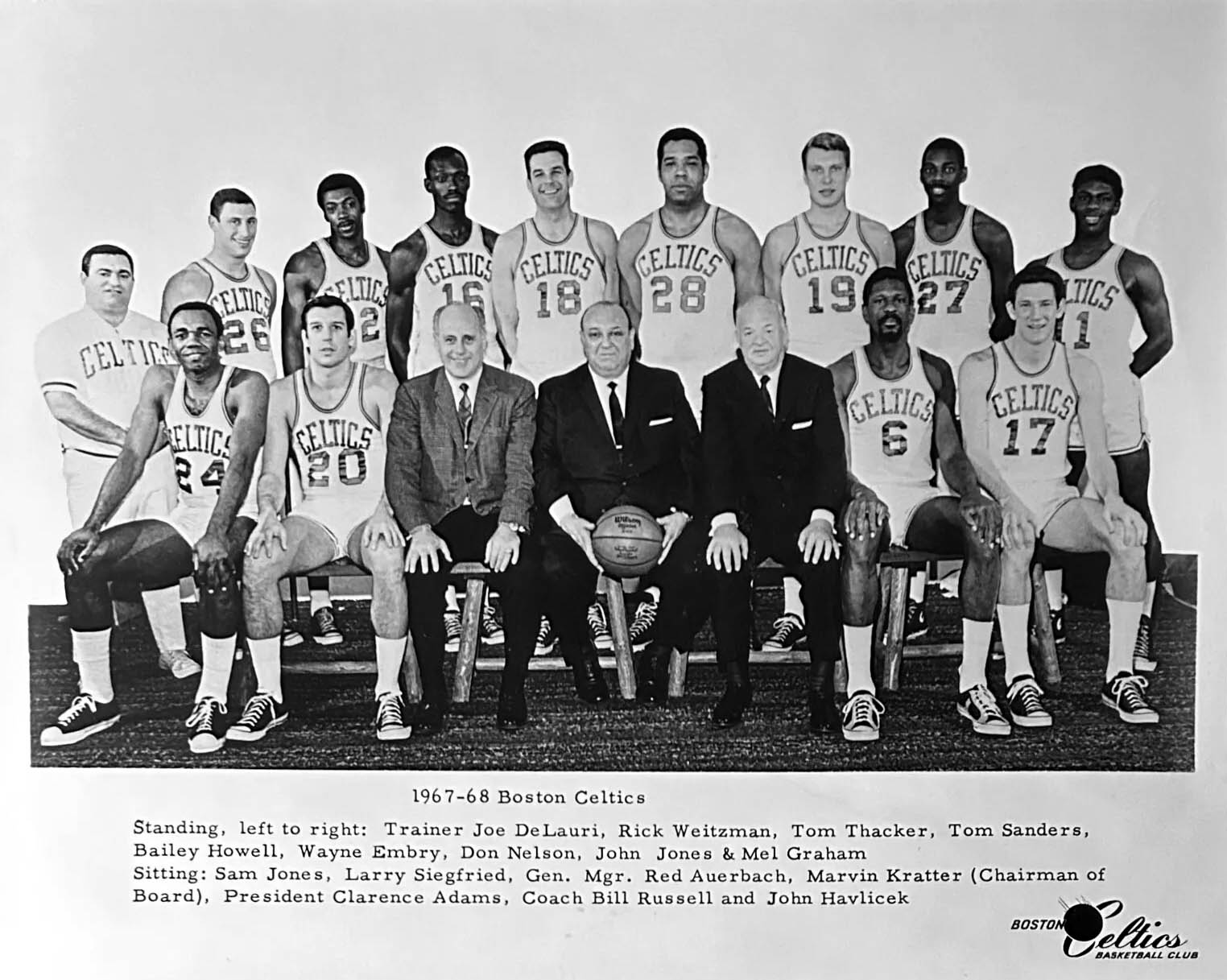
Celtics team photo

1967–68 Boston Celtics roster
Players

Pos.	No.	Player	Height	Weight	DOB	From
F/C	28	Wayne Embry	6 ft 8 in (2.03 m)	240 lb (109 kg)		Miami (OH)
PG	11	Mal Graham	6 ft 1 in (1.85 m)	185 lb (84 kg)		NYU
G/F	17	John Havlicek	6 ft 5 in (1.96 m)	203 lb (92 kg)		Ohio State
SF	18	Bailey Howell	6 ft 7 in (2.01 m)	210 lb (95 kg)		Mississippi State
PF	27	Johnny Jones	6 ft 7 in (2.01 m)	205 lb (93 kg)		Cal State LA
SG	24	Sam Jones	6 ft 4 in (1.93 m)	198 lb (90 kg)		North Carolina Central
F	19	Don Nelson	6 ft 6 in (1.98 m)	210 lb (95 kg)		Iowa
C	6	Bill Russell	6 ft 9 in (2.06 m)	215 lb (98 kg)		San Francisco
SF	16	Satch Sanders	6 ft 6 in (1.98 m)	210 lb (95 kg)		NYU
C/G	20	Larry Siegfried	6 ft 3 in (1.91 m)	190 lb (86 kg)		Ohio State
G/F	12	Tom Thacker	6 ft 2 in (1.88 m)	170 lb (77 kg)		Cincinnati
PG	26	Rick Weitzman	6 ft 2 in (1.88 m)	175 lb (79 kg)		Northeastern

Coaches
Head coach
- Bill Russell

Legend
- (DP) Unsigned draft pick
- (FA) Free agent
- (S) Suspended
- Injured

== Regular season ==
=== Season standings ===
Eastern Division	W	L	PCT	GB	Home	Road	Neutral	Div
x-Philadelphia 76ers	62	20	.756	–	27–8	26–12	9–0	29–11
x-Boston Celtics	54	28	.659	8	28–9	21–16	5–3	24–16
x-New York Knicks	43	39	.524	19	20–17	21–16	2–6	19–21
x-Detroit Pistons	40	42	.488	22	21–11	12–23	7–8	15–25
Cincinnati Royals	39	43	.476	23	18–12	13–23	8–8	18–22
Baltimore Bullets	36	46	.439	26	17–19	12–23	7–4	15–25

=== Game log ===
1967–68 game log
#	Date	Opponent	Score	High points	Record
1	October 14	Chicago	90–105	Larry Siegfried (20)	1–0
2	October 21	@ Baltimore	125–109	Sam Jones (31)	2–0
3	October 25	St. Louis	104–118	Sam Jones (25)	3–0
4	October 27	@ Detroit	128–109	John Havlicek (22)	4–0
5	October 28	Philadelphia	95–104	Sam Jones (23)	5–0
6	November 3	Los Angeles	104–105	Bill Russell (25)	6–0
7	November 4	@ St. Louis	104–111	Bailey Howell (27)	6–1
8	November 7	@ Cincinnati	113–103	John Havlicek (23)	7–1
9	November 9	@ Chicago	107–93	Sam Jones (23)	8–1
10	November 10	Baltimore	114–115	Sam Jones (39)	9–1
11	November 11	@ New York	105–110	Sam Jones (26)	9–2
12	November 14	N Seattle	111–114	Sam Jones (29)	10–2
13	November 15	San Francisco	110–113	Bailey Howell (27)	11–2
14	November 17	Cincinnati	120–119	Sam Jones (27)	11–3
15	November 18	@ Philadelphia	116–111	Howell, S. Jones (33)	12–3
16	November 21	N San Diego	114–121	Sam Jones (24)	13–3
17	November 22	San Diego	110–124	Sam Jones (26)	14–3
18	November 23	N Seattle	133–106	Bailey Howell (22)	14–4
19	November 25	@ Baltimore	118–126	Sam Jones (29)	14–5
20	November 28	Detroit	111–118	John Havlicek (24)	15–5
21	December 1	Los Angeles	119–123	Bill Russell (25)	16–5
22	December 2	@ Detroit	107–112	John Havlicek (24)	16–6
23	December 6	New York	113–115	Howell, S. Jones (27)	17–6
24	December 8	Baltimore	108–123	John Havlicek (25)	18–6
25	December 9	@ Cincinnati	104–108	Sam Jones (28)	18–7
26	December 14	Philadelphia	101–102	Larry Siegfried (20)	19–7
27	December 15	N San Diego	101–114	Sam Jones (27)	20–7
28	December 17	@ Los Angeles	123–117	Bill Russell (37)	21–7
29	December 19	@ Seattle	118–114	Larry Siegfried (20)	22–7
30	December 20	@ San Diego	126–116	Larry Siegfried (31)	23–7
31	December 22	Cincinnati	117–120	John Havlicek (27)	24–7
32	December 25	@ New York	134–124	Sam Jones (27)	25–7
33	December 26	San Francisco	117–104	John Havlicek (32)	25–8
34	December 27	@ St. Louis	113–116	Sam Jones (30)	25–9
35	December 29	@ Philadelphia	123–133	John Havlicek (24)	25–10
36	January 2	@ Chicago	84–95	Sam Jones (19)	25–11
37	January 3	@ Los Angeles	113–103	Bailey Howell (30)	26–11
38	January 5	N Seattle	128–121	Bailey Howell (25)	27–11
39	January 6	@ San Francisco	101–107	Satch Sanders (23)	27–12
40	January 10	Seattle	110–123	John Havlicek (25)	28–12
41	January 11	N Cincinnati	120–116	Bill Russell (34)	28–13
42	January 12	Detroit	126–148	Bailey Howell (28)	29–13
43	January 15	San Francisco	102–111	John Havlicek (28)	30–13
44	January 17	St. Louis	102–114	John Havlicek (35)	31–13
45	January 19	New York	114–120	Howell, S. Jones (31)	32–13
46	January 20	@ Baltimore	115–118	Sam Jones (38)	32–14
47	January 21	San Diego	112–139	Bailey Howell (31)	33–14
48	January 25	N St. Louis	105–93	John Havlicek (24)	33–15
49	January 26	Los Angeles	118–112	Sam Jones (27)	33–16
50	January 28	Philadelphia	103–115	Howell, S. Jones (29)	34–16
51	January 30	@ Philadelphia	118–125	Sam Jones (38)	34–17
52	January 31	Chicago	109–118	Bailey Howell (27)	35–17
53	February 2	Baltimore	99–120	Bailey Howell (25)	36–17
54	February 3	@ New York	112–108	Sam Jones (30)	37–17
55	February 4	New York	110–108	Bailey Howell (23)	37–18
56	February 7	St. Louis	101–102	Sam Jones (27)	38–18
57	February 9	Detroit	100–107	Sam Jones (24)	39–18
58	February 11	Los Angeles	141–104	Tom Thacker (17)	39–19
59	February 13	@ Detroit	127–115	Sam Jones (31)	40–19
60	February 14	N Detroit	96–118	John Havlicek (31)	41–19
61	February 16	@ Chicago	124–108	John Havlicek (26)	42–19
62	February 17	@ St. Louis	113–99	Bailey Howell (25)	43–19
63	February 18	@ Cincinnati	100–107	Sam Jones (24)	43–20
64	February 20	Cincinnati	110–126	Bailey Howell (25)	44–20
65	February 21	@ Los Angeles	117–122	Bill Russell (24)	44–21
66	February 23	@ San Francisco	122–127	Satch Sanders (25)	44–22
67	February 24	N Seattle	137–141	John Havlicek (38)	45–22
68	February 26	@ San Diego	118–110	Bailey Howell (28)	46–22
69	February 28	San Francisco	110–135	John Havlicek (41)	47–22
70	March 1	Chicago	87–94	Bailey Howell (18)	48–22
71	March 3	Philadelphia	133–127	Bailey Howell (35)	48–23
72	March 5	@ New York	113–91	John Havlicek (29)	49–23
73	March 6	New York	91–103	John Havlicek (25)	50–23
74	March 7	@ Chicago	112–118	John Havlicek (32)	50–24
75	March 8	@ Philadelphia	96–101	John Havlicek (32)	50–25
76	March 10	Cincinnati	137–111	Larry Siegfried (23)	50–26
77	March 11	@ Seattle	119–112	John Havlicek (27)	51–26
78	March 12	@ San Francisco	124–121 (OT)	Bailey Howell (30)	52–26
79	March 13	@ San Diego	144–118	John Havlicek (34)	53–26
80	March 16	@ Baltimore	136–111	Bailey Howell (26)	54–26
81	March 17	Baltimore	147–139	John Havlicek (29)	54–27
82	March 20	Detroit	125–116	Embry, Siegfried (23)	54–28

== Playoffs ==
1968 playoff game log
Division Semifinals: 4–2 (home: 2–1; road: 2–1)

Game	Date	Team	Score	High points	High rebounds	High assists	Location Attendance	Series
1	March 24	Detroit	W 123–116	John Havlicek (25)	Bill Russell (34)	Bill Russell (9)	Boston Garden; 7,591	1–0
2	March 25	@ Detroit	L 116–126	Sam Jones (18)	Bill Russell (14)	Siegfried, Jones (3)	Cobo Arena; 10,109	1–1
3	March 27	Detroit	L 98–109	John Havlicek (23)	Bill Russell (23)	Bill Russell (7)	Boston Garden; 8,429	1–2
4	March 28	@ Detroit	W 135–110	John Havlicek (35)	Bill Russell (21)	John Havlicek (9)	Cobo Arena; 11,294	2–2
5	March 31	Detroit	W 110–96	Bailey Howell (30)	Bill Russell (21)	John Havlicek (13)	Boston Garden; 8,093	3–2
6	April 1	@ Detroit	W 111–103	John Havlicek (31)	Bill Russell (23)	John Havlicek (12)	Cobo Arena; 9,483	4–2

Division Finals: 4–3 (home: 1–2; road: 3–1)

Game	Date	Team	Score	High points	High rebounds	High assists	Location Attendance	Series
1	April 5	@ Philadelphia	W 127–118	John Havlicek (35)	Bill Russell (22)	John Havlicek (11)	Spectrum; 14,412	1–0
2	April 10	Philadelphia	L 106–115	John Havlicek (28)	Bill Russell (20)	John Havlicek (9)	Boston Garden; 14,780	1–1
3	April 11	@ Philadelphia	L 114–122	John Havlicek (29)	Bill Russell (20)	John Havlicek (8)	Spectrum; 15,102	1–2
4	April 14	Philadelphia	L 105–110	Sam Jones (25)	Bill Russell (24)	John Havlicek (8)	Boston Garden; 10,503	1–3
5	April 15	@ Philadelphia	W 122–104	Sam Jones (37)	Bill Russell (24)	John Havlicek (10)	Spectrum; 15,202	2–3
6	April 17	Philadelphia	W 114–106	John Havlicek (28)	Bill Russell (31)	Havlicek, Siegfried (6)	Boston Garden; 14,780	3–3
7	April 19	@ Philadelphia	W 100–96	Sam Jones (22)	Bill Russell (26)	John Havlicek (8)	Spectrum; 15,202	4–3

NBA Finals: 4–2 (home: 2–1; road: 2–1)

Game	Date	Team	Score	High points	High rebounds	High assists	Location Attendance	Series
1	April 21	Los Angeles	W 107–101	Bailey Howell (20)	Bill Russell (25)	John Havlicek (8)	Boston Garden; 9,546	1–0
2	April 24	Los Angeles	L 113–123	John Havlicek (24)	Bill Russell (24)	Bill Russell (5)	Boston Garden; 14,780	1–1
3	April 26	@ Los Angeles	W 127–119	John Havlicek (27)	Bill Russell (16)	Bill Russell (9)	The Forum; 17,011	2–1
4	April 28	@ Los Angeles	L 105–118	Bailey Howell (24)	Bill Russell (22)	John Havlicek (8)	The Forum; 17,147	2–2
5	April 30	Los Angeles	W 120–117 (OT)	John Havlicek (31)	Bill Russell (25)	John Havlicek (8)	Boston Garden; 14,780	3–2
6	May 2	@ Los Angeles	W 124–109	John Havlicek (40)	Bill Russell (19)	John Havlicek (7)	The Forum; 17,392	4–2

1968 schedule

== Player statistics ==
Legend
GP Games played	GS Games started	MPG Minutes per game
FG% Field goal percentage	3FG% 3-point field goal percentage	FT% Free throw percentage
RPG Rebounds per game	APG Assists per game	SPG Steals per game
BPG Blocks per game	PPG Points per game

== Awards, records and milestones ==
=== Awards ===
- Bill Russell, All-NBA Second Team
- John Havlicek, All-NBA Second Team
