= 1967–68 Philadelphia 76ers season =

Season of National Basketball Association team the Philadelphia 76ers

- Division champions
- Head coach: Alex Hannum
- General manager: Jack Ramsay
- Owner: Irv Kosloff
- Arena: The Spectrum

Results
- Record: 62–20 (.756)
- Place: Division: 1st (Eastern)
- Playoff finish: East Finals (Lost to Celtics 3–4)
- Stats at Basketball Reference

Local media
- Television: WPHL-TV
- Radio: WCAU

The 1967–68 season of the Philadelphia 76ers was the team's fifteenth season in the National Basketball Association (NBA) and its fifth season since moving from Syracuse, as well as its first season at its new home in South Philadelphia, the Spectrum. The 76ers finished the regular season with a record of 62–20, and for the third straight year had the best record in the entire NBA.

== Background ==
During the playoffs, the Sixers eliminated the New York Knicks in the Eastern Conference Semifinals, 4 games to 2. The series win proved costly, as Billy Cunningham, their sixth man, injured his non-shooting wrist and was out for the remainder of the playoffs.

In the Eastern Conference Finals, the Sixers became the first team in NBA history to blow a 3–1 series lead as the team lost to the Boston Celtics in 7 games. What was so damaging about this series loss was that Games five and seven were at the Spectrum and Cunningham was not available. Instead, the team had the services of forward Johnny Green, who had been a four-time NBA All-Star during the 1960s and 1970s.

After the season, head coach Alex Hannum resigned to take a position in the ABA, and Wilt Chamberlain was traded to the Los Angeles Lakers for guard Archie Clark, center Darrall Imhoff, and forward Jerry Chambers (who never played with the team).

Philadelphia subsequently won only a single home playoff game from 1969 to 1971 (game six, 1971 playoffs vs. Baltimore), going 0–7 for the remaining home games from 1969 to 1971. It would be nine seasons before the team won a single post-season series.

== Offseason ==
Wilt Chamberlain left the team for the Los Angeles Lakers.

== Regular season ==
=== Season standings ===
Eastern Division	W	L	PCT	GB	Home	Road	Neutral	Div
x-Philadelphia 76ers	62	20	.756	–	27–8	26–12	9–0	29–11
x-Boston Celtics	54	28	.659	8	28–9	21–16	5–3	24–16
x-New York Knicks	43	39	.524	19	20–17	21–16	2–6	19–21
x-Detroit Pistons	40	42	.488	22	21–11	12–23	7–8	15–25
Cincinnati Royals	39	43	.476	23	18–12	13–23	8–8	18–22
Baltimore Bullets	36	46	.439	26	17–19	12–23	7–4	15–25

=== Game log ===
1967–68 Game log
#	Date	Opponent	Score	High points	Record
1	October 18	Los Angeles	87–103	Billy Cunningham (20)	1–0
2	October 21	Detroit	111–116	Hal Greer (41)	2–0
3	October 24	N Detroit	124–102	Hal Greer (38)	3–0
4	October 25	New York	114–117	Hal Greer (33)	4–0
5	October 27	Seattle	115–132	Hal Greer (26)	5–0
6	October 28	@ Boston	95–104	Chet Walker (17)	5–1
7	November 1	Baltimore	111–136	Hal Greer (27)	6–1
8	November 4	San Francisco	110–117	Wali Jones (29)	7–1
9	November 7	@ San Diego	130–105	Hal Greer (30)	8–1
10	November 8	@ San Diego	129–114	Billy Cunningham (33)	9–1
11	November 10	@ San Francisco	104–123	Billy Cunningham (24)	9–2
12	November 11	@ Los Angeles	115–111	Hal Greer (36)	10–2
13	November 14	Cincinnati	102–122	Wilt Chamberlain (27)	11–2
14	November 15	@ Detroit	120–123	Hal Greer (39)	11–3
15	November 17	N St. Louis	117–125	Billy Cunningham (38)	12–3
16	November 18	Boston	116–111	Billy Cunningham (31)	12–4
17	November 22	@ St. Louis	113–115	Hal Greer (34)	12–5
18	November 23	San Diego	117–128	Wilt Chamberlain (31)	13–5
19	November 24	@ Chicago	122–104	Wilt Chamberlain (34)	14–5
20	November 25	Chicago	119–114	Hal Greer (37)	14–6
21	November 28	@ New York	110–108	Lucious Jackson (30)	15–6
22	November 29	San Francisco	113–95	Chet Walker (24)	15–7
23	December 1	N Seattle	109–133	Wilt Chamberlain (52)	16–7
24	December 2	Baltimore	121–130	Chamberlain, Greer (27)	17–7
25	December 5	Los Angeles	128–122 (OT)	Wilt Chamberlain (31)	17–8
26	December 6	@ Cincinnati	108–107	Wilt Chamberlain (29)	18–8
27	December 8	New York	109–117	Wilt Chamberlain (26)	19–8
28	December 9	@ Baltimore	123–109	Billy Cunningham (33)	20–8
29	December 12	N Seattle	107–118	Hal Greer (38)	21–8
30	December 14	@ Boston	101–102	Hal Greer (20)	21–9
31	December 15	St. Louis	98–107	Wilt Chamberlain (23)	22–9
32	December 16	@ Chicago	143–123	Wilt Chamberlain (68)	23–9
33	December 17	@ Seattle	139–124	Wilt Chamberlain (47)	24–9
34	December 20	@ Seattle	160–122	Wilt Chamberlain (53)	25–9
35	December 25	@ Baltimore	108–105	Cunningham, Greer (27)	26–9
36	December 26	Cincinnati	121–126	Chet Walker (28)	27–9
37	December 27	@ New York	114–105	Hal Greer (28)	28–9
38	December 29	Boston	123–133	Billy Cunningham (36)	29–9
39	December 30	N Detroit	122–107	Wilt Chamberlain (30)	30–9
40	January 3	New York	129–115	Wilt Chamberlain (39)	30–10
41	January 5	Los Angeles	113–125	Wilt Chamberlain (35)	31–10
42	January 6	@ St. Louis	107–96	Lucious Jackson (27)	32–10
43	January 7	@ Cincinnati	118–134	Wilt Chamberlain (36)	32–11
44	January 10	St. Louis	134–122	Wilt Chamberlain (32)	32–12
45	January 12	Baltimore	116–133	Wilt Chamberlain (36)	33–12
46	January 13	@ Detroit	115–106	Wilt Chamberlain (27)	34–12
47	January 17	@ Los Angeles	116–125	Wali Jones (20)	34–13
48	January 19	@ San Francisco	120–131	Billy Cunningham (25)	34–14
49	January 20	@ Chicago	135–111	Hal Greer (26)	35–14
50	January 25	@ Detroit	123–108	Hal Greer (35)	36–14
51	January 26	Cincinnati	113–123	Hal Greer (36)	37–14
52	January 28	@ Boston	103–115	Wilt Chamberlain (19)	37–15
53	January 30	Boston	118–125	Hal Greer (27)	38–15
54	February 2	Detroit	121–131	Hal Greer (23)	39–15
55	February 3	@ Baltimore	133–121	Hal Greer (31)	40–15
56	February 4	San Francisco	117–141	Hal Greer (29)	41–15
57	February 7	N San Diego	103–125	Hal Greer (27)	42–15
58	February 9	Chicago	113–118	Hal Greer (35)	43–15
59	February 10	@ New York	97–115	Chet Walker (25)	43–16
60	February 11	N St. Louis	93–119	Billy Cunningham (23)	44–16
61	February 13	@ San Francisco	112–105	Hal Greer (30)	45–16
62	February 14	N Seattle	149–125	Wilt Chamberlain (35)	46–16
63	February 16	@ San Diego	124–108	Billy Cunningham (26)	47–16
64	February 17	@ Los Angeles	135–134 (2OT)	Wilt Chamberlain (32)	48–16
65	February 18	@ San Diego	106–111	Wilt Chamberlain (34)	48–17
66	February 20	Seattle	108–140	Hal Greer (32)	49–17
67	February 23	Detroit	117–138	Wilt Chamberlain (31)	50–17
68	February 25	@ St. Louis	126–119	Hal Greer (32)	51–17
69	February 27	San Francisco	107–127	Wilt Chamberlain (33)	52–17
70	March 3	@ Boston	133–127	Hal Greer (43)	53–17
71	March 5	San Diego	103–134	Wilt Chamberlain (31)	54–17
72	March 6	@ Cincinnati	106–108	Wilt Chamberlain (22)	54–18
73	March 7	N Cincinnati	125–117	Wilt Chamberlain (38)	55–18
74	March 8	Boston	96–101	Hal Greer (27)	56–18
75	March 10	@ New York	119–108	Chamberlain, Greer (28)	57–18
76	March 12	N Chicago	139–115	Hal Greer (30)	58–18
77	March 13	New York	130–120	Hal Greer (28)	58–19
78	March 15	Baltimore	115–122	Hal Greer (29)	59–19
79	March 16	@ Chicago	144–122	Wilt Chamberlain (35)	60–19
80	March 18	Los Angeles	128–158	Wilt Chamberlain (53)	61–19
81	March 19	Cincinnati	131–130 (OT)	Hal Greer (26)	61–20
82	March 20	@ Baltimore	137–119	Wilt Chamberlain (26)	62–20

== Playoffs ==
1968 playoff game log
Division Semifinals: 4–2 (home: 3–0; road: 1–2)

Game	Date	Team	Score	High points	High rebounds	High assists	Location Attendance	Series
1	March 22	New York	W 118–110	Wilt Chamberlain (37)	Wilt Chamberlain (29)	Wilt Chamberlain (7)	Spectrum; 5,093	1–0
2	March 23	@ New York	L 117–128	Chamberlain, Greer (24)	Wilt Chamberlain (17)	Wilt Chamberlain (8)	Madison Square Garden III; 15,911	1–1
3	March 27	New York	W 138–132 (2OT)	Chet Walker (32)	Wilt Chamberlain (24)	Wilt Chamberlain (8)	Spectrum; 6,951	2–1
4	March 30	@ New York	L 98–107	Wilt Chamberlain (23)	Wilt Chamberlain (27)	Hal Greer (6)	Madison Square Garden III; 18,262	2–2
5	March 31	New York	W 123–105	Hal Greer (38)	Wilt Chamberlain (21)	Chamberlain, Greer (7)	Spectrum; 6,979	3–2
6	April 1	@ New York	W 113–97	Hal Greer (35)	Wilt Chamberlain (27)	Hal Greer (4)	Madison Square Garden III; 18,014	4–2

Division Finals: 3–4 (home: 1–3; road: 2–1)

Game	Date	Team	Score	High points	High rebounds	High assists	Location Attendance	Series
1	April 5	Boston	L 118–127	Wilt Chamberlain (33)	Wilt Chamberlain (25)	Chamberlain, Jones (5)	Spectrum; 14,412	0–1
2	April 10	@ Boston	W 115–106	Wali Jones (24)	Wilt Chamberlain (19)	Wilt Chamberlain (8)	Boston Garden; 14,780	1–1
3	April 11	Boston	W 122–114	Hal Greer (31)	Wilt Chamberlain (25)	Hal Greer (9)	Spectrum; 15,102	2–1
4	April 14	@ Boston	W 110–105	Hal Greer (28)	Wilt Chamberlain (16)	Wilt Chamberlain (8)	Boston Garden; 10,503	3–1
5	April 15	Boston	L 104–122	Wilt Chamberlain (28)	Wilt Chamberlain (30)	Wilt Chamberlain (7)	Spectrum; 15,202	3–2
6	April 17	@ Boston	L 106–114	Hal Greer (40)	Wilt Chamberlain (27)	Wilt Chamberlain (8)	Boston Garden; 14,780	3–3
7	April 19	Boston	L 96–100	Hal Greer (22)	Wilt Chamberlain (34)	Chamberlain, Greer (5)	Spectrum; 15,202	3–4

1968 schedule

== Awards and honors ==
- Wilt Chamberlain, NBA leader, Assists
- Wilt Chamberlain, NBA Most Valuable Player Award
- Wilt Chamberlain, All-NBA First Team
- Hal Greer, All-NBA Second Team
