= 1967–68 NBA season =

22nd NBA season

- League: National Basketball Association
- Sport: Basketball
- Duration: October 13, 1967 – March 20, 1968; March 22 – April 19, 1968 (Playoffs); April 21 – May 2, 1968 (Finals)
- Games: 82
- Teams: 12
- TV partner: ABC

Draft
- Top draft pick: Jimmy Walker
- Picked by: Detroit Pistons

Regular season
- Top seed: Philadelphia 76ers
- Season MVP: Wilt Chamberlain (Philadelphia)
- Top scorer: Dave Bing (Detroit)

Playoffs
- Eastern champions: Boston Celtics
- Eastern runners-up: Philadelphia 76ers
- Western champions: Los Angeles Lakers
- Western runners-up: San Francisco Warriors

Finals
- Champions: Boston Celtics
- Runners-up: Los Angeles Lakers

NBA seasons
- ← 1966–67 1968–69 →

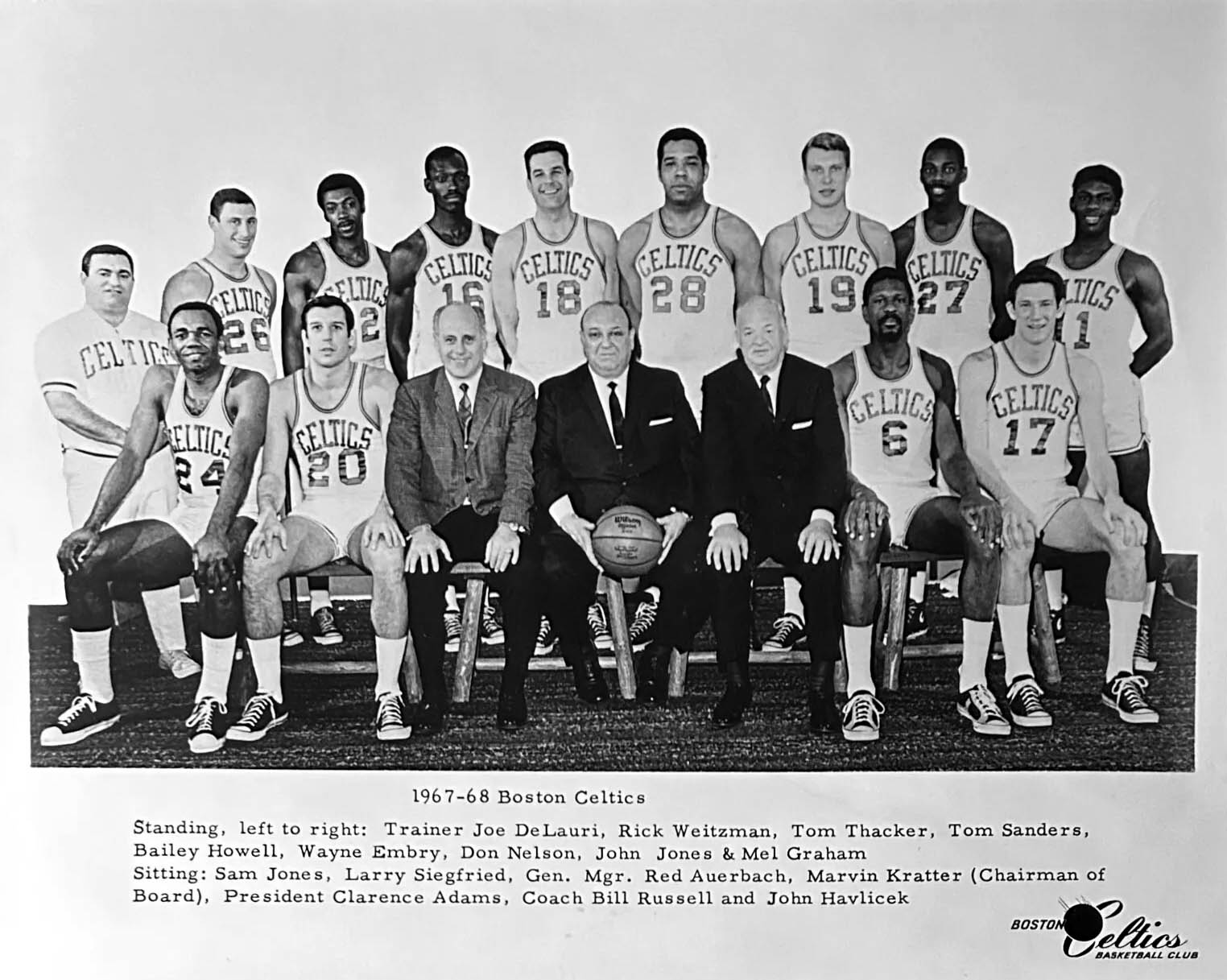
Boston Celtics, 1967–68 NBA champions

The 1967–68 NBA season was the 22nd season of the National Basketball Association. The season ended with the Boston Celtics winning the NBA championship, beating the Los Angeles Lakers 4 games to 2 in the NBA Finals.

== Notable occurrences ==
- The Seattle SuperSonics and the San Diego Rockets begin play as the league expands to 12 teams.
- The NBA expands its regular season from 81 games per team to 82 games, where it still stands to this date.
- The 1968 NBA All-Star Game was played at the Madison Square Garden in New York City, with the East beating the West 144–124. Hal Greer of the Philadelphia 76ers wins the game's MVP award.
- The American Basketball Association begins play as a rival league to the NBA.
- The Philadelphia 76ers play their inaugural season at the Spectrum and the Los Angeles Lakers play their inaugural season at The Forum.
- The Hawks play their final season in St. Louis before relocating to Atlanta the following season.
- In February, the New York Knicks left the old Madison Square Garden for the new Madison Square Garden.
- The Detroit Pistons move from the West Division to the East Division.
- It was the rookie seasons for eventual Hall of Fame players Walt Frazier and Earl Monroe as well as Phil Jackson and Pat Riley who made the Hall of Fame as coaches.
- It was also the final season for George Lee, Tom Thacker, Reggie Harding and Larry Costello who would later coach the Milwaukee Bucks to the 1971 NBA Championship.

Coaching changes
Offseason
Team	1966–67 coach	1967–68 coach
Cincinnati Royals	Jack McMahon	Ed Jucker
Los Angeles Lakers	Fred Schaus	Butch Van Breda Kolff
New York Knicks	Vince Boryla	Dick McGuire
San Diego Rockets	Expansion	Jack McMahon
Seattle SuperSonics	Expansion	Al Bianchi
In-season
Team	Outgoing coach	Incoming coach
New York Knicks	Dick McGuire	Red Holzman

== Season recap ==
The season began with the Philadelphia 76ers, the dominant winners from a year ago who had ended Boston's dynasty, looking very good to repeat under coach Alex Hannum and superstar Wilt Chamberlain. The Sixers had six scorers over 11 per game, and were again based around their four leading scorers: Chamberlain, Hal Greer, Billy Cunningham, and Chet Walker. Philadelphia led the league at 122.6 points per game, scoring more field goals and free throws than any other NBA team. They posted a league-high 62 wins in 82 NBA games, now the league standard.

Chamberlain cut his scoring back again to 24.3 per game, but still had one of his best seasons. Typically, he again led the league in rebounds, minutes played, and field goal accuracy at 59.5%. His 932 free throw tries, another NBA high, helped offset his poor shooting there also. Chamberlain also led the entire NBA in assists. His 702 passes for scores were more than even Oscar Robertson that year. Chamberlain's penchant for passing even produced a rare event—a triple-20. 20 points, 20 rebounds and 20 assists all in the same NBA game on February 2, 1968. Chamberlain alleges he also blocked 12 shots in that game. If so, it could be one of possibly 15 quadruple-double games or more that marked his playing days as a Philadelphia 76er. Blocked shots were not then an official NBA statistic. So the truth about this will never be truly verified.

Three other NBA teams won 50 or more games this year, getting some easy ones at the expense of the new clubs in Seattle and San Diego. The St. Louis Hawks, now fully recovered from the retirement of Bob Pettit, posted 56 wins to win the NBA's West Division. Rich Guerin's club got strong rebounding from their front line and got 20-point scoring from All-Pro point guard Lenny Wilkens and center Zelmo Beaty. The Hawks did have seven scorers over ten points per game, but lost Lou Hudson to military service for 35 games, which slowed them down. The Hawks again also had the league's top-rated defense. Following the season, the Hawks would relocate to Atlanta.

The Boston Celtics faced surprising criticism this year, but won 54 games in Bill Russell's second season as player/coach. The 6' 10 225-pound 33-year-old led his team again from his center spot, ranking third in rebounds and shots blocked and quietly finishing tenth in NBA in assists just behind teammate John Havlicek. Havlicek played more guard than forward this year and was an all-star with his strong all-around game. He was one of three 20-point scorers along with Sam Jones and Bailey Howell. Seven Celtics averaged ten points.

The Los Angeles Lakers won 52 games behind the now-legendary tandem of Jerry West and Elgin Baylor. West battled injuries again but scored 26.3 points per game, made 51% of his shots from the floor and averaged six assists. He again also had several steals each game, but steals, like blocks, were not an official stat yet. Baylor added 26 points per game of his own and was ninth in NBA rebounds. Center play was still a weakness, but Laker guard Archie Clark added 20 points per game and defense to boost the team. A strong bench as well made the Lakers an improved contender from seasons past.

== Final standings ==
=== Eastern Division ===
Eastern Division	W	L	PCT	GB	Home	Road	Neutral	Div
x-Philadelphia 76ers	62	20	.756	–	27–8	26–12	9–0	29–11
x-Boston Celtics	54	28	.659	8	28–9	21–16	5–3	24–16
x-New York Knicks	43	39	.524	19	20–17	21–16	2–6	19–21
x-Detroit Pistons	40	42	.488	22	21–11	12–23	7–8	15–25
Cincinnati Royals	39	43	.476	23	18–12	13–23	8–8	18–22
Baltimore Bullets	36	46	.439	26	17–19	12–23	7–4	15–25

=== Western Division ===
Western Division	W	L	PCT	GB	Home	Road	Neutral	Div
x-St. Louis Hawks	56	26	.683	–	25–7	22–13	9–6	31–9
x-Los Angeles Lakers	52	30	.634	4	30–11	18–19	4–0	28–12
x-San Francisco Warriors	43	39	.524	13	27–14	16–23	0–2	24–16
x-Chicago Bulls	29	53	.354	27	11–22	12–24	6–7	11–29
Seattle SuperSonics	23	59	.280	33	10–21	7–24	6–14	15–25
San Diego Rockets	15	67	.183	41	8–33	4–26	3–8	11–29

x – clinched playoff spot

== Playoffs ==
Division Semifinals
E1	Philadelphia*	4
E3	New York	2
Eastern Division
E4	Detroit	2
E2	Boston	4
W1	St. Louis*	2
W3	San Francisco	4
Western Division
W4	Chicago	1
W2	Los Angeles	4

Division Finals
E1	Philadelphia*	3
E2	Boston	4
W3	San Francisco	0
W2	Los Angeles	4

NBA Finals
E2	Boston	4
W2	Los Angeles	2

- * Division winner
- Bold Series winner
- Italic Team with home-court advantage in NBA Finals

== Statistics leaders ==
Category	Player	Team	Stat
Points	Dave Bing	Detroit Pistons	2,142
Rebounds	Wilt Chamberlain	Philadelphia 76ers	1,952
Assists	Wilt Chamberlain	Philadelphia 76ers	702
FG%	Wilt Chamberlain	Philadelphia 76ers	.595
FT%	Oscar Robertson	Cincinnati Royals	.873

Note: Prior to the 1969–70 season, league leaders in points, rebounds, and assists were determined by totals rather than averages.

== NBA awards ==
- Most Valuable Player: Wilt Chamberlain, Philadelphia 76ers
- Rookie of the Year: Earl Monroe, Baltimore Bullets
- Coach of the Year: Richie Guerin, St. Louis Hawks
- All-NBA First Team:
  - G – Dave Bing, Detroit Pistons
  - G – Oscar Robertson, Cincinnati Royals
  - C – Wilt Chamberlain, Philadelphia 76ers
  - F – Jerry Lucas, Cincinnati Royals
  - F – Elgin Baylor, Los Angeles Lakers
- All-NBA Second Team:
  - G – Hal Greer, Philadelphia 76ers
  - G – Jerry West, Los Angeles Lakers
  - C – Bill Russell, Boston Celtics
  - F – Willis Reed, New York Knicks
  - F – John Havlicek, Boston Celtics
- NBA All-Rookie First Team:
  - Al Tucker, Seattle SuperSonics
  - Walt Frazier, New York Knicks
  - Phil Jackson, New York Knicks
  - Bob Rule, Seattle SuperSonics
  - Earl Monroe, Baltimore Bullets

== See also ==
- 1968 NBA Finals
- 1967–68 ABA season
- List of NBA regular season records
