= Don Kojis =

American basketball player (1939–2021)

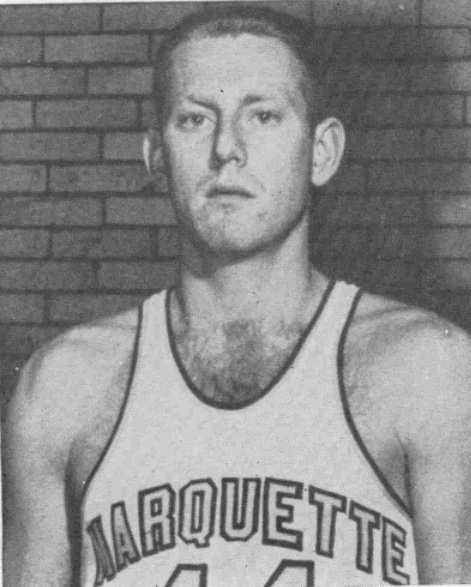
- Kojis from the 1960 Hilltop

Personal information
- Born: July 15, 1939 Milwaukee, Wisconsin, U.S.
- Died: November 19, 2021 (aged 82) San Diego, California, U.S.
- Listed height: 6 ft 5 in (1.96 m)
- Listed weight: 215 lb (98 kg)

Career information
- High school: Notre Dame (Milwaukee, Wisconsin)
- College: Marquette (1958–1961)
- NBA draft: 1961: 2nd round, 21st overall pick
- Drafted by: Chicago Packers
- Playing career: 1961–1975
- Position: Small forward
- Number: 22, 16, 9, 44, 21

Career history
- 1961–1963: Phillips 66ers
- 1963–1964: Baltimore Bullets
- 1964–1966: Detroit Pistons
- 1966–1967: Chicago Bulls
- 1967–1970: San Diego Rockets
- 1970–1972: Seattle SuperSonics
- 1972–1975: Kansas City-Omaha Kings

Career highlights
- 2× NBA All-Star (1968, 1969); No. 44 retired by Marquette Golden Eagles

Career NBA statistics
- Points: 9,948 (12.2 ppg)
- Rebounds: 4,555 (5.6 rpg)
- Assists: 1,112 (1.4 apg)
- Stats at NBA.com
- Stats at Basketball Reference
Medals
Representing United States
Men's basketball
Pan American Games
Gold medal – first place	1963 São Paulo	Team Competition

Donald Raymond Kojis (January 15, 1939 – November 19, 2021) was an American professional basketball player who played twelve seasons in the National Basketball Association (NBA), with the Baltimore Bullets, Detroit Pistons, Chicago Bulls, San Diego Rockets, Seattle SuperSonics, and Kansas City–Omaha Kings. He was a two-time NBA All-Star. He was the first player in Rockets' franchise history to be named an NBA All-Star. Before entering the NBA, he was a two-time Amateur Athletic Union basketball champion with the Phillips 66ers. He played three varsity season for Marquette University (1958 to 1961), averaging a double-double and setting rebounding records at Marquette that still stand after 65 years. Kojis was twice named a Catholic College All-American.

Kojis is credited as involved in the creation and/or advancement of the alley-oop dunk, which he used as early as December 1961 with Phillips 66ers' teammate Charlie Bowerman as the passer; then known as the "Kangaroo Kram". Kojis and Guy Rodgers introduced the alley-oop to the NBA with the Chicago Bulls during the 1966–67 season.

== Early life ==
Kojis was born on July 15, 1939, in Milwaukee, Wisconsin. He attended Notre Dame High School in Milwaukee, where he was a standout basketball player. As a junior in 1956, Kojis set a record for most points in a season in the Catholic Conference. In 1956, he was named to the All-State Catholic tournament team. In 1957, he was named by the Associated Press (AP) to its first-team All-Wisconsin high school basketball team. Kojis averaged over 31 points per game in 1957. He scored 48 points in a January 1957 game.

Kojis said he was 5 ft 9 in (1.75 m) when he started high school, and left at 6 ft 6 in (1.98 m). He began jumping rope 15 minutes a day in high school to improve his coordination. Kojis later attributed his jump rope practice as a key factor in developing his leaping ability.

== College basketball ==
Kojis attended Marquette University from 1957 to 1961, where he was a two-time All American for the then Marquette Warriors (now the Golden Eagles). Although only 6 ft 5 in (1.96 m), Kojis was often tasked with playing center on Marquette's small-sized team. Kojis had tremendous leaping ability. Basketball legend Wilt Chamberlain would later say Kojis was "'the most jumping white boy I've ever seen'". Kojis led Marquette in rebounding every year he was on the varsity team.

Kojis played center on Marquette's freshman team in 1957–58. In his sophomore season (1958–59) Kojis averaged 13.9 points and 13 rebounds per game; leading the varsity team in rebounding, while being second in scoring. Marquette was invited to play in the 1959 NCAA University Division basketball tournament. Kojis had 13 points and 14 rebounds in the first round of the Mideast Regional tournament, in an 89–71 win over Bowling Green. He led Marquette with 17 points and 21 rebounds in their Mideast Regional semifinal loss to Michigan State. Kojis was selected to the 1959 All-Mideast Regional Tournament Team.

Kojis led Marquette in both scoring and rebounding in the 1959–60 season, averaging 20.9 points and 15.4 rebounds per game. Catholic Digest named Kojis to its 1960 Catholic All-America Team.

In 1960–61 Kojis again led Marquette in both scoring (21.4 points per game), and rebounding (17.1 rebounds per game). He was sixth among men's college basketball players nationally in rebounding average as a senior. In 1961, Catholic Digest named Kojis to its Catholic All-America Team for a second consecutive season, and The Tablet named Kojis to its first-team Catholic All-America Team. He was an honorable mention All-American by the Associated Press (AP) and United Press International (UPI) in 1961.

== AAU basketball and the Kangaroo Kram ==
Kojis was drafted by the Chicago Packers in the second round of the 1961 NBA draft, 13th overall. Instead of going into the NBA, Kojis chose to play for the Phillips Oilers (also known as the Phillips 66ers). The team was based in Bartlesville, Oklahoma. Kojis also worked in the Phillips Petroleum Company's marketing department. Phillips had played in the National Industrial Basketball League (NIBL), competing in Amateur Athletic Union basketball. At the time, working for a corporation while playing on its basketball team could be a more financially desirable career path for a player than playing in the NBA. After seeing Chicago's contract offer compared to his opportunity to work for Phillips Petroleum and be trained in sales, while also playing AAU basketball, Kojis said choosing Phillips and the AAU "'was the best decision I ever made'".

The NIBL ceased operations before the 1961–62 season; Kojis's rookie AAU season. The Phillips 66ers continued to play AAU basketball thereafter, winning the AAU championship in April 1962 during Kojis's first season with the team. Phillips won the 1963 AAU championship as well, with Kojis named Most Valuable Player in the 1963 AAU tournament.

Kojis played two seasons for the 66ers. During the 66ers 1961–62 season, Kojis and teammate Charlie Bowerman began to develop the "Kangaroo Kram", which would later be known as the "alley-oop". This came to include Kojis using a backhanded Kangaroo Kram. The Kangaroo Kram, with Bowerman passing and Kojis catching and slam dunking, was described in the local Bartlesville press in late December 1961: "It's like trying to describe a spiral staircase without using your hands, but the pass is lobbed to the side of the basket, and with perfect timing Kojis dives in, grabs the ball with both hands and stuffs its down the net . . . at full speed".

== International basketball ==
Before the Phillips 66ers' 1961–62 season began in the United States, Kojis and the 66ers played 14 games in Greece, Lebanon, Egypt, and Syria. In 1963, he was captain of the United States Men's National Basketball Team at the 1963 FIBA World Championship that came in fourth place. He was also captain of the U.S. team that won the Gold Medal at the 1963 Pan American Games a few weeks earlier.

== NBA basketball ==
=== Baltimore Bullets and Detroit Pistons ===
Kojis decided to forego his amateur status and possible participation in the 1964 Olympics. He resigned from the Phillips Petroleum Company in September 1963, with the intention of playing for the NBA's Baltimore Bullets. Kojis joined the Bullets for 1963-64 NBA season. The Chicago Packers, who had drafted Kojis two years earlier, had changed their name to the Chicago Zephyrs in 1962, and then moved to Baltimore for the 1963 season; where they became the Baltimore Bullets. Kojis played forward for the Bullets in his rookie NBA season, averaging about 15 minutes, 6.3 points, and four rebounds per game.

In June 1964, Kojis was involved in an eight-player trade between the Bullets and the Detroit Pistons. The Bullets traded Terry Dischinger, Rod Thorn and Kojis to the Pistons for Bailey Howell, Don Ohl, Bob Ferry, and incoming rookies Les Hunter and Wali Jones. In his two seasons with Detroit, Kojis averaged about 13 minutes per game. In 1964–65, he averaged 6.5 points and 3.7 rebounds per game; and in 1965–66, he averaged 7.3 points and 4.3 rebounds per game. Kojis holds the Detroit Pistons' record for most two-point field goal attempts per 48 minutes (25.35). He is third in two-point field goal attempts per 36 minutes.

=== Chicago Bulls ===
The Pistons did not protect Kojis in the 1966 NBA expansion draft, and he was selected by the Chicago Bulls for their inaugural season. Kojis began the 1966–67 season as a Bulls' reserve; but became a starter later in the season. The Bulls had future Naismith Basketball Hall of Fame point guard Guy Rodgers, who led the NBA in assists that season (11.2 per game). He and Kojis worked together and "introduced the back door baseline lob slam dunk to the NBA", which became the team's most popular play that year in Chicago.

Overall, Kojis averaged 21.2 minutes, 10.2 points, and 6.1 rebounds per game for the Bulls. He had one double-double in his first 36 games that season, and 14 after that. Kojis had a 20 point, 20 rebound game in mid-January against the Cincinnati Royals. In a mid-February game against the Los Angeles Lakers, Kojis played all 48 minutes, with 42 points and 18 rebounds. The Bulls were swept in three games by the St. Louis Hawks in the first round of the NBA Western Division semifinals, but Kojis averaged 34.7 minutes, 17 points, 10 rebounds, and 1.3 assists per game in that series (second only to Bob Boozer in scoring and rebounding for the Bulls).

=== San Diego Rockets ===
Kojis was selected by the San Diego Rockets in the 1967 NBA expansion draft. Kojis was "disillusioned and hurt" that the Bulls had made him available in the expansion draft. Kojis later said that he was mistakenly made available on the Bulls list of unprotected players, when one of the team's owners placed Kojis's name on that list while drunk on the flight to New York to attend the expansion draft. Kojis later said, "'Coming to the Rockets was the break I needed. Coming to San Diego I found a home'".

Kojis's best years in the NBA came with the Rockets. In the 1967–68 season, he averaged 19.7 points per game and a career-high 10.3 rebounds a game. In the 1968–69 season, he averaged a career-high 22.5 points and 9.6 rebounds a game. He was named to the 1968 and 1969 NBA West All-Star Teams, as a San Diego Rocket, and was a starter in the 1969 game, alongside teammate Elvin Hayes. In 1968, he became the first player in Rockets' franchise history to play in an NBA All-Star Game.

In 1969–70, Kojis was the Rocket's captain. Kojis had threatened to retire before the 1969–70 season, and was given a three-year contract extension, but at the same salary he already had. Kojis remained at odds with Rocket management during the season, and demanded a trade in early December 1969. He was averaging 20.5 points per game over his first 31 games when he fractured his ankle in a mid-December game against the Detroit Pistons.

Kojis did not play between December 17, 1969 and February 1, 1970. On the season, he played in only 56 games, averaging 28.2 minutes, 15.3 points, and 6.9 rebounds per game. Before the injury on December 17, he had 15 double-doubles, and had scored 20 or more points 18 times (including a 40-point game against the Bulls). After the injury, he scored 20 points in a game only once more that season and did not have more than nine rebounds in any game. Over the remaining five years of his career, Kojis never averaged more than 27.2 minutes, 14.6 points, and 5.5 rebounds per game in any of those seasons.

During the 1969–70 season, Kojis reportedly maintained his desire to either be traded or receive a new contract with a salary increase that was comparable with the top forwards in the NBA. In mid-April 1970, the Rockets sold his contract rights to the Seattle SuperSonics.

=== Seattle SuperSonics and Kansas City–Omaha Kings ===
Kojis played two seasons for the Seattle SuperSonics (1970 to 1972). In the 1970–71 season, he averaged 27.1 minutes, 14.6 points, and 5.5 rebounds per game. The following season (1971–72) he averaged 25.4 minutes, 11.4 points, and 4.6 rebounds per game. In August 1972, the SuperSonics traded Kojis and Pete Cross to the Kansas City-Omaha Kings for Sonny Fox and a future draft choice. Kojis played his final three NBA seasons for the Kings, averaging 20.4 minutes, 10.2 points, and 3.5 rebounds per game. The Kings waived Kojis in August 1975.

In 12 NBA seasons, Kojis played in 814 games, had 19,241 minutes played, 3,947 field goals made, 8,853 field goals attempted, a .446 field goal percentage, 2,054 free throws made, 2,853 free throws attempted, a .720 free throw percentage, 4,555 rebounds, 1,112 assists, 1,937 personal fouls and 9,948 points. With a slight knee bend, Kojis jump-shot his free-throw attempts.

== Legacy and honors ==
In late December 1961, Marquette retired Kojis's No. 44 jersey during the halftime of a game between Marquette and Minnesota. In 1972, he was inducted into the Marquette 'M Club' Hall of Fame. Kojis's rebounds per game averages as a senior (17.1) and junior (15.4) at Marquette are the two highest season averages in Marquette team history; and his sophomore average (13) is seventh highest in school history (through 2025–26). His 1,222 total career rebounds is first in school history. Kojis was also Marquette's all-time scoring leader when he graduated, with 1,504 points. His 578 points and 462 rebounds in 1961 were also school season record's at the time. Kojis is still fifth in school history with a career 18.6 points per game average.

NBA Hall of Famer Elvin Hayes, who played with Kojis in San Diego, said "'Kojis was a great scorer . . . He could go to the hoop real strong, he had great movement around the basket and he could shoot the ball off the pick. He was a super offensive player that a lot of people don't remember or know about. What I remember most was that he always went after everything hard'". Former NBA player and head coach John Egan said of Kojis "'He was strong, he could shoot and he could penetrate . . . He was a helluva offensive player'".

Kojis was the players' union representative for the San Diego Rockets and became a plaintiff in the lawsuit that led to NBA free agency and the merger with the ABA.

=== The alley-oop ===
In his first year with the Bulls, Kojis played with future Naismith Memorial Basketball Hall of Fame point guard Guy Rodgers, who was known for his advanced passing skills. Rodgers had led the league in assists in 1962-63 (10.44) and would lead the league in the Bulls' inaugural 1966–67 season (11.21). Rodgers and Kojis worked together and "introduced the back door baseline lob slam dunk to the NBA" (now known as the alley-oop), which became the team's most popular play that year in Chicago. The precise origins of the alley-oop are not wholly clear. Among other claims, future Celtics champions and Hall of Famers Bill Russell and K.C. Jones are said to have developed the alley-oop, or a version of it, at the University of San Francisco in the 1950s. Kojis himself teamed with Charlie Bowerman while on the Phillips 66ers to regularly use the alley-oop (which they called the "Kangaroo Kram") from 1961 to 1963 while playing AAU basketball.

=== Kojis and the expansion draft ===
Kojis was taken in three expansion drafts. He was selected by the expansion Chicago Packers in 1961, the expansion Chicago Bulls in 1966, and the expansion San Diego Rockets in 1967. He was one of at least five players ever selected in three expansion drafts. The others were George Wilson (1967, 1968, 1970), Len Chappell (1966, 1968, 1970), John Barnhill (1966, 1967, 1968), and McCoy McLemore (1966, 1968, 1970). Kojis was also one of a small number of players who actually played for three expansion teams in those teams' first year of existence. Kojis said he was mistakenly made available on the Bulls list of unprotected players because one of the team's owners placed his name on that list while drunk on the flight to New York for the expansion draft.

== Personal life and death ==
Kojis worked as a stockbroker in Milwaukee during the offseasons during his NBA career, and continued working as a stockbroker after retiring in 1975. Kojis resided in the San Diego County community of Julian, California and was the director of Whispering Winds Catholic Conference Center for 34 years, serving hundreds of thousands of people over that time. Kojis and a friend, Jerry Tisi, had gone with their families to a Protestant summer vacation family camp in 1975, and decided the next year to create the same kind of setting as a Catholic camp, in the San Diego area; keeping it open to people of all Christian denominations.

Kojis died on November 19, 2021, at the age of 82.

== Career statistics ==
Legend
GP	Games played	GS	Games started	MPG	Minutes per game
FG%	Field goal percentage	3P%	3-point field goal percentage	FT%	Free throw percentage
RPG	Rebounds per game	APG	Assists per game	SPG	Steals per game
BPG	Blocks per game	PPG	Points per game	**Bold**	Career high

=== NBA ===
==== Regular season ====
Year	Team	GP	GS	MPG	FG%	FT%	RPG	APG	SPG	BPG	PPG
1963–64	Baltimore	78		14.7	.419	.562	4.0	.7			6.3
1964–65	Detroit	65		12.9	.433	.633	3.7	1.0			6.5
1965–66	Detroit	60		13.1	.415	.539	4.3	.7			7.3
1966–67	Chicago	78		21.2	.426	.604	6.1	.9			10.2
1967–68	San Diego	69		36.9	.446	.726	**10.3**	**2.6**			19.7
1968–69	San Diego	**81**		**38.6**	.434	.748	9.6	**2.6**			**22.5**
1969–70	San Diego	56		28.2	.447	.751	6.9	1.4			15.3
1970–71	Seattle	79		27.1	.446	.778	5.5	1.6			14.6
1971–72	Seattle	73		25.4	.469	**.793**	4.6	1.1			11.4
1972–73	Kansas City–Omaha	77		16.1	**.480**	.774	2.6	1.0			8.5
1973–74	Kansas City–Omaha	77		27.2	.478	.772	5.0	1.4	**1.0**	**.2**	13.1
1974–75	Kansas City–Omaha	21		11.0	.469	.667	1.9	.5	.6	.0	5.3
Career		814		23.6	.446	.720	5.6	1.4	.9	.2	12.2
All-Star		2	1	13.0	.333	.800	3.5	2.0			6.0

==== Playoffs ====
Year	Team	GP	MPG	FG%	FT%	RPG	APG	SPG	BPG	PPG
1967	Chicago	3	34.7	**.479**	.625	**10.0**	1.3			17.0
1969	San Diego	**6**	**38.7**	.440	.806	8.5	**3.5**			**20.2**
1975	Kansas City–Omaha	4	5.5	.167	**.833**	1.0	.3	.3	.0	1.8
Career		13	27.5	.442	.778	6.5	2.0	.3	.0	13.8
