= Zelmo Beaty =

American basketball player (1939–2013)

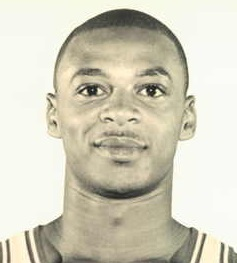
- Beaty in 1966

Personal information
- Born: October 25, 1939 Hillister, Texas, U.S.
- Died: August 27, 2013 (aged 73) Bellevue, Washington, U.S.
- Listed height: 6 ft 9 in (2.06 m)
- Listed weight: 225 lb (102 kg)

Career information
- High school: Scott (Woodville, Texas)
- College: Prairie View A&M (1958–1962)
- NBA draft: 1962: 1st round, 3rd overall pick
- Drafted by: St. Louis Hawks
- Playing career: 1962–1975
- Position: Center
- Number: 14, 31

Career history

Playing
- 1962–1969: St. Louis / Atlanta Hawks
- 1970–1974: Utah Stars
- 1974–1975: Los Angeles Lakers

Coaching
- 1975–1976: Virginia Squires

Career highlights
- ABA champion (1971); ABA Playoffs MVP (1971); 2× NBA All-Star (1966, 1968); NBA All-Rookie First Team (1963); 3× ABA All-Star (1971–1973); 2× All-ABA Second Team (1971, 1972); ABA All-Time Team; NAIA tournament MVP (1962)

Career NBA and ABA statistics
- Points: 15,207 (17.1 ppg)
- Rebounds: 9,665 (10.9 rpg)
- Assists: 1,365 (1.5 apg)
- Stats at NBA.com
- Stats at Basketball Reference
- Basketball Hall of Fame
- Collegiate Basketball Hall of Fame

Zelmo "Big Z" Beaty (/ˈbeɪtiː/ BAY-tee; October 25, 1939 – August 27, 2013) was an American basketball player. He played eight seasons in the National Basketball Association (NBA) and four in the rival American Basketball Association (ABA). In 2016, he was inducted into the Naismith Basketball Hall of Fame. He was earlier selected to the ABA All-Time Team. Beaty excelled in both high school and college basketball before being selected as a first round draft pick by the St. Louis Hawks in the 1962 NBA draft, with the third overall pick. He was a member of the NBA's inaugural All-Rookie Team in 1963. He was a two-time NBA All-Star in seven years with the Hawks, and averaged double-doubles for six consecutive seasons after his rookie year. The Hawks went to the NBA playoffs every season he was on the team.

In October 1969, Beaty signed a contract to join the Los Angeles Stars (later the Utah Stars) in the American Basketball Association. He did not play in the 1969–70 season because of the restriction imposed by the option clause in his NBA contract with the Hawks. In four seasons with the Utah Stars (1970 to 1974), he was an ABA All-Star three times and second-team All-ABA twice, while being a key figure in the Stars run to the 1971 ABA championship, where he recorded 36 points and 16 rebounds in the decisive Game 7 victory on his way to being named the 1971 ABA Playoffs Most Valuable Player. This is still the only professional basketball championship for the state of Utah.

Beaty has also been inducted into the National Collegiate Basketball Hall of Fame, the NAIA Hall of Fame, and the Small College Basketball Hall of Fame. Beaty played for Prairie View A&M University from 1958 to 1962, averaging 25 points and 20 rebounds per game over his college career. He led Prairie View to the NAIA national basketball tournament championship in 1962, had 28 points and 29 rebounds in the championship game, and was named the 1962 NAIA Chuck Taylor Tournament MVP. Beaty was a two-time first team NAIA All-American (1960, 1962), two-time first-team United Press International small college All-American (1961, 1962), and a first-team Associated Press Little All-American (1962) after being a second-team Little All-American the prior year (1961).

== Early life ==
Zelmo Beaty Jr. was born on October 25, 1939, in Hillister, Texas, a small town of 250. Beaty's father died when he was a child. He attended the segregated Scott High School in Woodville, Texas, and played for coach John Payton, winning back-to-back Prairie View Interscholastic League 1A state championships in 1957 and 1958.

Beaty credited his high school basketball coach John Payton with Beaty's future success playing basketball in college and professionally. Before Payton's involvement in his life, Beaty played sports generally, without an athletic focus. Payton believed Beaty could be a basketball player and focused Beaty on basketball; giving Beaty more direction as a basketball coach than any other coach Beaty had.

== College ==
Beaty attended Prairie View A&M University, a small National Association of Intercollegiate Athletics (NAIA) school outside of Houston. Prairie View is the oldest historically black college and university in Texas. Beaty played on the Prairie View Panthers basketball team from 1958 to 1962, in the Southwestern Conference. Prairie View was the Southwestern Conference champion in both 1960–61 and 1961–62, and Beaty was All-Southwestern Conference as a sophomore, junior, and senior. In March 1960, at the end of his sophomore season, Beaty was among 14 players selected by the NAIA for an Olympic basketball tryout team.

Over his college career, Beaty averaged 25 points and 20 rebounds per game, and was a two-time first team NAIA All-American selection (1960, 1962). Beaty received the most votes of any player selected to the 1962 NAIA All-America Team. In 1960, United Press International (UPI) named Beaty a third-team small college All-American. As a junior (1960–61) and senior (1961–62), UPI named Beaty to its first-team small college All-America basketball teams. He was named a first-team Little All-American by the Associated Press (AP) in 1962, after having been named a second-team Little All-American by the AP in 1961.

Beaty led Prairie View to a national small college championship in 1962, his senior season. He averaged 24.6 points and 21.6 rebounds per game that season, with a .601 field goal percentage. The Panthers had a 27–3 record; with Beaty missing three games due to injury. After having been ranked No. 1 by the Associated Press and United Press International at the end of the 1961–62 regular season, the Panthers went into the 1962 NAIA national championship tournament as the second seed, with the Westminster College Titans the top ranked team in the tournament.

Prairie View barely won its first-round game over the Ashland College Eagles; with Beaty scoring 33 points. Beaty tied the game with 32 seconds remaining in the second half; and then scored six straight points to start the overtime in leading the Panthers to a 73–64 win. The Panthers won their next three games in the tournament before defeating the Titans, 62–53, for the NAIA title. Beaty had 28 points and 29 rebounds in the championship game against Westminster. He was named the Chuck Taylor Tournament MVP, and was selected to the All-Tournament Team.

Beaty was known as the "Big Z" at Prairie View; and carried that nickname as a professional player as well.

== Professional career ==
=== NBA ===
==== St. Louis/Atlanta Hawks ====
Beaty was selected with the third pick of the 1962 NBA draft by the St. Louis Hawks. Hawks' owner Ben Kerner said they selected Beaty because the Hawks needed a tough rebounder. He played in 80 games as a rookie, averaging 24 minutes, 10.2 points, and 8.3 rebounds per game. Beaty was named to the inaugural NBA All-Rookie Team in 1963, along with Dave DeBusschere, Terry Dischinger, John Havlicek and Chet Walker. The Hawks played the Los Angeles Lakers in the 1963 Western Division playoff finals, losing in seven games. Beaty played in all seven games, averaging 29 minutes, 11.7 points, and 7.3 rebounds per game. He had 21 points and 15 rebounds in the Hawks first win of the series (Game 3), and 16 points and 13 rebounds in the Hawks Game 6 win.

After his rookie season, Beaty averaged a double-double with the Hawks over the next six seasons (1963 to 1969). He averaged more than 20 points per game in three of his last four seasons with the Hawks; and at least 10.7 rebounds per game for six seasons. A physical player, Beaty led the NBA in personal fouls in 1962–63 and 1965–66, and tied for the league lead in disqualifications during the 1963–64 season.

In the 1965–66 season, Beaty averaged 20.7 points and 13.6 rebounds per game in 80 regular season games. He was sixth in the NBA in rebounding average and 10th in scoring average that season. Beaty was selected to play for the West in his first All-Star Game. He had 18 rebounds and 10 points in 24 minutes during the 1966 All-Star Game. In the Hawks first round sweep of the Baltimore Bullets in the 1966 Western Division semifinals, Beaty averaged 13.3 points and 12 rebounds per game. The Hawks lost in seven game to the Lakers in the 1966 Western Division finals. During that series, Beaty led the Hawks in minutes per game (43), points per game (21.4), and rebounds per game (13.6).

Beaty suffered a knee injury during the 10th game of the 1966–67 season in early November that required knee surgery. He did not play between November 8, 1966 and January 12, 1967; but did return to finish the season on January 12. He played in a career-low 48 regular season games, while still averaging 17.8 points and 10.7 rebounds per game. He averaged 26.7 minutes, 13 points, and 7.3 rebounds per game in the three game 1967 Western Conference semifinals sweep of the Chicago Bulls. He then played nearly 40 minutes per game in all six games of the Hawks Western Conference playoff finals series loss to the San Francisco Warriors; averaging 17.3 points and 11.2 rebounds per game. Beaty led the Hawks in their Game 6 loss in minutes played (45), points (28), and rebounds (16).

Beaty played in all 82 regular season games for the Hawks during the 1967–68 season. He averaged 37.4 minutes, 21.1 points (team-leading and 12th in the NBA), and 11.7 rebounds (11th in the NBA) per game. On December 3, 1967, Beaty scored an NBA career high 42 points in a 123–109 win over the Seattle SuperSonics. He was selected to play in the 1968 NBA All-Star Game, and had 10 rebounds in that game. The Hawks lost in the 1968 Western Division semifinals to the Warriors in six games, but Beaty averaged 39.8 minutes, 21.5 points, and 13.5 rebounds per game.

Beaty played in 72 games during the 1968–69 season. He averaged 35.8 minutes, 21.5 points, and 11.1 rebounds per game in the regular season. In a late January 1969 game against the Los Angeles Lakers, Beaty scored 36 points playing against Wilt Chamberlain. During the 1969 NBA Playoffs, the first Hawks postseason in Atlanta, Beaty averaged 22.5 points (his highest NBA playoffs average) and 12.9 rebounds in 11 games. In a pattern familiar for the 1960s Hawks, they were eliminated in the Western Division finals by the Los Angeles Lakers, the round before the NBA Finals. In the five-game series loss to the Lakers, Beaty led the Hawks playing 45 minutes per game and scoring 24.2 points per game, while also averaging 13.2 rebounds and three assists per game.

During his Hawks tenure, Beaty made two NBA All-Star Game appearances in 1966 and 1968, and helped the Hawks reach the playoffs every season of his tenure. Beaty played 501 regular season games in his seven seasons with the Hawks. He averaged 33.4 minutes, 17.1 points, and 10.9 rebounds per game. In 63 playoff games with the Hawks, Beaty averaged 37.2 minutes, 17 points, and 11 rebounds per game.

In October 1969, Beaty signed a contract to play in the rival American Basketball Association (ABA), and he did not play for the Hawks again. In early February 1970, the Hawks traded Beaty's contract rights to the San Francisco Warriors for a first round draft choice (later used to select Pete Maravich). The trade also included a contingency that if the Hawks were able to sign Beaty, despite his commitment to join the ABA, then the Warriors also had to send Clyde Lee to the Hawks.

The Hawks were in the playoffs every season Beaty was with the team. Beaty served as the union player representative with the Hawks.

==== Los Angeles Lakers ====
In late September 1974, nearly four years and eight months after the February 1970 trade with the Warriors, the Hawks signed Beaty to a contract and then traded him to the Lakers the same day. NBA commissioner J. Walter Kennedy still required the Warriors to send Lee to the Hawks, since they had signed Beaty. Beaty returned to the NBA for his final season, 1974–75, playing in 69 games as a reserve center for the Los Angeles Lakers.

=== ABA ===
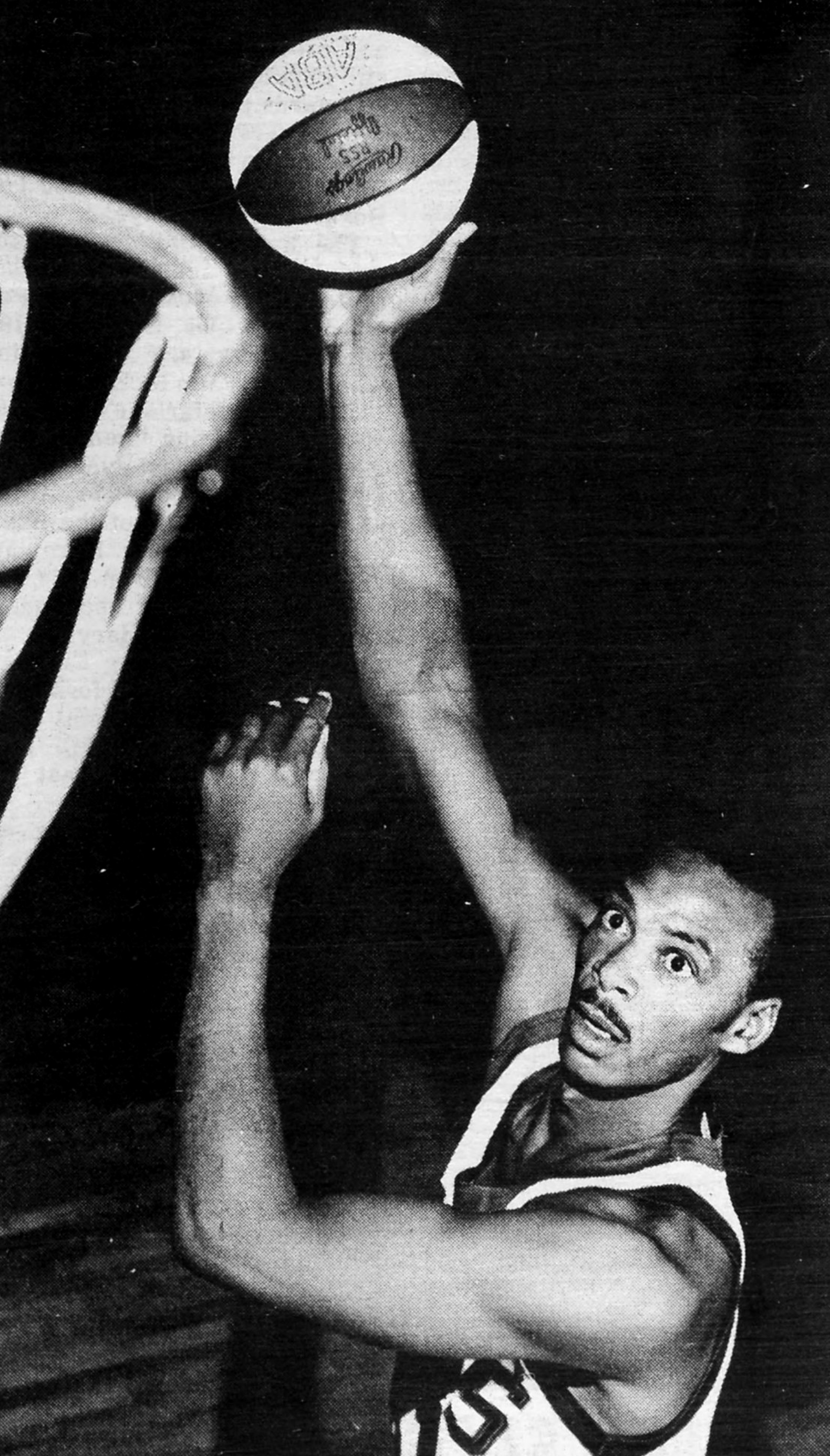
Beaty with the Utah Stars in 1971

==== Utah Stars ====
Beaty's contract with the Hawks ended on September 30, 1969. He received a lucrative four-year contract offer to play for the Los Angeles Stars of the American Basketball Association, doubling his salary with the Hawks, and signed with the Stars on October 7. At the time, Beaty stated that the Stars' offer provided him greater financial security than he had with the Hawks. Under the option clause in his contract with the Hawks, if Beaty did not sign with the Hawks and the Hawks wanted to retain him, he either had to play for the Hawks one more season (1969–70) without a new contract, or sit out an entire season to be free of the Hawks. Upon signing with the Stars, Beaty said he would choose to forego playing altogether in the 1969–70 season rather than playing for the Hawks, so as not to risk injury before joining the Stars in 1970–71. The Hawks separately obtained a court injunction legally barring Beaty from playing in the ABA during the 1969-70 NBA season.

The Stars moved from Los Angeles to Salt Lake City, Utah before the 1970–71 season. In his first season in the ABA (1970–1971), Beaty led the league in two-point field goal percentage (.555) and offensive rebounds per game (5.4), was third in the league in rebounds per game (15.7), and averaged 22.9 points per game (10th in the ABA). He was selected to play in the 1971 ABA All-Star Game, and was second in ABA Most Valuable Player voting that season to Mel Daniels. Beaty and Dan Issel tied for second-team center All-ABA in 1971, with Daniels the first-team center.

Coached by Bill Sharman and also featuring ABA star Willie Wise, the Stars were dominant in the regular season and finished with the second best record in the league at 57–27. Utah's success continued in the playoffs, sweeping the Texas Chaparrals in the first round (4–0), before defeating the Indiana Pacers and Daniels (4–3) to advance to the 1971 ABA Finals. The Stars defeated Dan Issel and the Kentucky Colonels in seven games to win the 1971 ABA Finals. In the finals against the Colonels, Beaty averaged 28.4 points and 16 rebounds per game, including recording totals of 36 points and 16 rebounds in the Game 7 win to end the series. After the game, Beaty was awarded the ABA Playoffs Most Valuable Player Award for his role in the championship victory. This was the first professional sports championship in Utah, and the only professional basketball championship in Utah history.

The following year (1971–72), Beaty averaged a career high (for both his NBA and ABA careers) of 23.6 points per game while playing all 84 games of the regular season. He also averaged 13.2 rebounds per game. Beaty was selected to play in 1972 ABA All-Star Game. He was third in MVP voting that season, and was again second-team All-ABA. However, that postseason the Stars would be eliminated during a hard-fought seven-game series in the Western Division Finals by the Pacers, who Utah had beaten the year before to advance to the finals. Beaty averaged 38.1 minutes, 20.4 points, 14.1 rebounds, and 2.7 assists per game in that series.

Beaty's left knee had bothered him throughout the playoffs, and he had surgery to address cartilage damage after the season ended in May 1972. Beaty had the same surgery on his right knee while playing for the Hawks years earlier, and the same St. Louis physician (Dr. Stan London) performed both procedures.

Beaty was an all-star for the third consecutive season in 1972–73, but his arthritic knees kept him from practicing with the Stars during his final two seasons in Utah. Beaty still averaged 32.4 minutes, 16.4 points, and 9.8 rebounds per game during the regular season. It was the first time in nine years, however, that he had not averaged a double-double. In 10 playoff games in 1973, he averaged 38.7 minutes, 15.9 points, and 11.6 rebounds per game.

By 1973–1974 during his final year with the Stars, Beaty was severely hampered by knee injuries, having undergone six surgeries on his knees during his career. Beaty, the president of the ABA Players Association, held out before the 1973–74 season seeking to renegotiate his contract. In response, the Stars filed a lawsuit against Beaty and his attorney Larry Fleisher. The Stars dropped the suit after Beaty rejoined the team and paid the Stars a $7,000 fine. In February 1974, Beaty brought his own lawsuit against the Stars, alleging numerous breaches of contract and seeking damages of over $1 million.

Even during his lawsuit, Beaty continued to play for the Stars. He averaged 32.2 minutes, 13.4 points, and eight rebounds per game that season. Beaty played in only 13 of the Stars 18 playoff games in 1974 because of a serious infection. He averaged 36.3 minutes, 14.8 points, and 10.8 rebounds per game in the playoffs. The Stars lost the 1974 ABA Finals to the New York Nets and Julius Erving in five games. Beaty was able to return to play in the third game of that series, a 103–100 overtime loss; playing 46 minutes, with 22 points and 16 rebounds. He had 18 points and eight rebounds in Game 4, the Stars only win in the series.

In total, Beaty played four seasons with the Stars, being named to the All-ABA second-team twice and making the ABA All-Star Game three times (1971 to 1973), before returning to the NBA as a member of the Los Angeles Lakers. In 319 regular season games with the Stars, he averaged 19.1 points and 11.6 rebounds per game. In 52 Stars' playoff games, Beaty averaged 38.5 minutes, 19.1 points, and 13 rebounds per game.

== Coaching career ==
In the 1975–1976 season, he briefly served as head coach for the ABA's Virginia Squires for 42 games. He was the Squires third head coach that season, replacing the 4–19 Bill Musselman who became coach after the 1–6 Al Bianchi was fired. General manager Jack Ankerson was a two-game interim coach for the Squires before Beatty's appointment. The Squires ceased operations after that season.

== Legacy and honors ==
In 2016, Beaty was inducted into Naismith Basketball Hall of Fame. In 1997, Beaty was named to the ABA's 30-man all-time team. In 2014, he was inducted into the National Collegiate Basketball Hall of Fame. In 1968, Beaty was inducted into the NAIA Hall of Fame. Beaty was selected as a member of both the NAIA’s 50th and 75th Anniversary Teams. In 2017, he was inducted into the Small College Basketball Hall of Fame. In 2015, he was inducted into the Texas Sports Hall of Fame. In 1989, Beaty was inducted into the Prairie View A&M Sports Hall of Fame, and is a recipient of the William "Billy" Nicks Legend Award.

Over his 12 seasons in the NBA and ABA, Beaty scored 15,207 points and had 9,665 rebounds, averaging 17.1 points per game and 10.9 rebounds per game. He ranks 38th all-time in ABA/NBA history in rebounds per game (8th in ABA history and 41st in NBA history); and ranks 53rd all-time in ABA/NBA history in total rebounds (through 2025–26).

The March 16, 2022, game between Maryland Eastern Shore and Coastal Carolina at The Basketball Classic has been designated the Zelmo Beaty Game.

Host Josh Levin ends every episode of the Slate sports podcast Hang Up and Listen by saying, "Remember Zelmo Beaty". This is a reference to an appearance by Shaquille O'Neal on the Late Show with David Letterman in which the host asked O'Neal about several centers from earlier eras and O'Neal did not know about Beaty even though Beaty made significant contributions to the game on and off the court.

== Personal life and death ==
After retiring from professional basketball, Beaty worked in financial planning. He previously had worked at a bank in Southern California during the year between playing for the Hawks and Stars. He also worked as a substitute physical education teacher in Seattle elementary schools. As reported by Naismith Memorial Basketball Hall of Fame Curt Gowdy Award writer Peter Vecsey, Beaty's Utah roommate Willie Wise said Beaty "was greatly influenced by Martin Luther King and became a staunch proponent for equality in all arenas, especially education. That’s why he became a substitute teacher. He went into the unruliest schools in Washington State because he wanted Afro American kids to have a chance to learn'".

Beaty died from cancer on August 27, 2013, at his home in Bellevue, Washington. He was 73 years old. He had been married to his wife Ann for over 50 years, and had two children. They met while both were in college at Prairie View, and married in February 1963.

== NBA/ABA career statistics ==
Legend
GP	Games played	GS	Games started	MPG	Minutes per game
FG%	Field goal percentage	3P%	3-point field goal percentage	FT%	Free throw percentage
RPG	Rebounds per game	APG	Assists per game	SPG	Steals per game
BPG	Blocks per game	PPG	Points per game	**Bold**	Career high

†	Denotes seasons in which Beaty won an ABA championship
*	Led the league

=== Regular season ===
Year	Team	GP	GS	MPG	FG%	3P%	FT%	RPG	APG	SPG	BPG	PPG
1962–63	St. Louis	80	–	24.0	.439	–	.717	8.3	1.1	–	–	10.2
1963–64	St. Louis	59	–	32.6	.444	–	.741	10.7	1.3	–	–	13.1
1964–65	St. Louis	80	–	36.5	.482	–	.715	12.1	1.4	–	–	16.9
1965–66	St. Louis	80	–	**38.4**	.473	–	.758	13.6	1.6	–	–	20.7
1966–67	St. Louis	48	–	34.6	.473	–	.758	10.7	1.3	–	–	17.8
1967–68	St. Louis	82	–	37.4	.488	–	.794	11.7	**2.1**	–	–	21.1
1968–69	Atlanta	72	–	35.8	.470	–	.731	11.1	1.8	–	–	21.5
1970–71†	Utah (ABA)	76	–	**38.4**	**.555***	**.500**	.791	**15.7**	1.9	–	–	22.9
1971–72	Utah (ABA)	**84**	–	37.3	.539	.000	**.829**	13.2	1.5	–	–	**23.6**
1972–73	Utah (ABA)	82	–	34.2	.520	.000	.803	9.8	1.5	–	**1.0**	16.4
1973–74	Utah (ABA)	77	–	32.2	.524	.000	.795	8.0	1.7	**0.8**	0.8	13.4
1974–75	L.A. Lakers	69	–	17.6	.439	–	.800	4.7	1.1	0.7	0.4	5.5
Career		889	–	33.4	.494	.154	.771	10.9	1.5	0.7	0.8	17.1
All-Star		5	1	24.6	.340	–	.789	9.4	1.2	0.2	0.4	9.8

=== Playoffs ===
Year	Team	GP	GS	MPG	FG%	3P%	FT%	RPG	APG	SPG	BPG	PPG
1963	St. Louis	11	–	27.9	.443	–	.750	7.6	1.0	–	–	10.3
1964	St. Louis	12	–	36.3	.521	–	.597	9.5	1.0	–	–	14.3
1965	St. Louis	4	–	38.5	.492	–	.760	13.8	0.3	–	–	19.3
1966	St. Louis	10	–	41.8	.493	–	.759	13.1	2.2	–	–	19.0
1967	St. Louis	9	–	35.3	.442	–	.785	9.9	1.3	–	–	15.9
1968	St. Louis	6	–	39.8	.467	–	.782	13.5	**2.5**	–	–	21.5
1969	Atlanta	11	–	**43.0**	.432	–	.672	12.9	2.3	–	–	22.5
1971†	Utah (ABA)	**18**	–	38.8	.536	–	**.846**	**14.6**	2.4	–	–	**23.2**
1972	Utah (ABA)	11	–	40.3	**.552**	–	.830	14.0	2.2	–	–	20.1
1973	Utah (ABA)	10	–	38.7	**.552**	–	.827	11.6	1.4	–	–	15.9
1974	Utah (ABA)	13	–	36.3	.503	–	.825	10.8	1.6	**1.4**	**0.9**	14.8
Career		115	–	37.8	.496	–	.770	11.9	1.7	1.4	0.9	17.9

== Head coaching career ==
Team	Year	G	W	L	W–L%	Finish	PG	PW	PL	PW–L%	Result
Virginia	1975–76	42	9	33	.214	7th in ABA	–	–	–	–	Missed playoffs
Career		42	9	33	.214		0	0	0	–	
