= 1966 NBA expansion draft =

Player selection draft

General information
- Sport: Basketball
- Date: April 30 – May 1, 1966

Overview
- League: NBA
- Expansion team: Chicago Bulls

The 1966 NBA expansion draft was the second expansion draft of the National Basketball Association (NBA). The draft was held from April 30 to May 1, 1966, so that the newly founded Chicago Bulls could acquire players for the upcoming 1966–67 season. Chicago had been awarded the expansion team on January 16, 1966. The Bulls were the third NBA franchise to play in Chicago, following the Chicago Stags, which folded in 1950, and the Chicago Packers–Zephyrs, which moved to Baltimore and became the Baltimore Bullets in 1963.

In an NBA expansion draft, new NBA teams are allowed to acquire players from the previously established teams in the league. Not all players on a given team are available during an expansion draft, since each team can protect a certain number of players from being selected. Before the 1966 expansion draft, the Bulls' general manager, Dick Klein, asked that each team reduce the number of protected players from eight (as initially planned) to seven. In exchange, he agreed to pick last (instead of first) in each round of that year's college draft. He also promised Red Auerbach of the Boston Celtics that he would not draft Boston's K. C. Jones, as long as Auerbach met with him to share his opinions of other players throughout the NBA.

The Bulls selected eighteen unprotected players, two from each of the nine other NBA teams. On the first day of the draft, they selected players from the Eastern Division teams; on the second day, they picked from the Western Division teams. The Bulls' selections included former first overall pick Bob Boozer, three-time All-Star Johnny Kerr and one-time All-Star Len Chappell. Kerr retired from playing prior to the start of the season, and was later named the franchise's first head coach. Another expansion draft pick, Al Bianchi, also retired as a player and was later named the team's assistant coach. Dick Klein had been planning to hire Kerr and Bianchi as coaches before the draft even took place, but because they were still underplaying contracts with other teams, Klein needed to draft them instead of hiring them outright. Ten players from the expansion draft joined the Bulls for their inaugural season, but only six played more than one season for the team. Guy Rodgers—whom the Bulls acquired in exchange for Jim King and Jeff Mullins—and Jerry Sloan were named to the 1967 All-Star Game, becoming the franchise's first All-Stars.

Sloan played ten seasons with the Bulls and became the Bulls' franchise leader in games played when he retired in 1976, a record which has since been broken by Michael Jordan and Scottie Pippen. He then coached the Bulls from 1979 to 1982, and in 1988, embarked upon a coaching career with the Utah Jazz that lasted 23 years. Sloan has since been inducted into the Naismith Memorial Basketball Hall of Fame as a coach, as has fellow draftee John Thompson. The latter never worked for the Bulls in any capacity, but found success as a coach at Georgetown University.

== Key ==
Pos.	G	F	C
Position	Guard	Forward	Center

^{+}	Denotes player who has been selected for at least one All-Star Game

== Selections ==
Player	Pos.	Nationality	Previous team	Years of NBA experience^{[a]}	Career with the franchise	Ref.
John Barnhill	G	United States	Detroit Pistons	4	—^{[b]}	
Al Bianchi	G	United States	Philadelphia 76ers	10	—^{[b]}	
Ron Bonham	F	United States	Boston Celtics	2	—^{[b]}	
Bob Boozer^{+}	F	United States	Los Angeles Lakers	6	1966–1969	
Nate Bowman	C	United States	Cincinnati Royals	0^{[c]}	1966	
Len Chappell^{+}	F/C	United States	New York Knicks	4	1966	
Barry Clemens	F	United States	New York Knicks	1	1966–1969	
Keith Erickson	G/F	United States	San Francisco Warriors	1	1966–1968	
Johnny Kerr^{+}	F/C	United States	Baltimore Bullets	12	—^{[b]}	
Jim King^{+}	G	United States	Los Angeles Lakers	3	—^{[b]}	
Don Kojis^{+}	F	United States	Detroit Pistons	3	1966–1967	
McCoy McLemore	F/C	United States	San Francisco Warriors	2	1966–1968	
Jeff Mullins^{+}	G/F	United States	St. Louis Hawks	2	—^{[b]}	
Jerry Sloan^{+}	G/F	United States	Baltimore Bullets	1	1966–1976	
Tom Thacker	G/F	United States	Cincinnati Royals	3	—^{[b]}	
John Thompson	F	United States	Boston Celtics	2	—^{[b]}	
Gerry Ward	G	United States	Philadelphia 76ers	3	1966–1967	
Jim Washington	F/C	United States	St. Louis Hawks	1	1966–1969	

== Notes ==
- ^{a} Number of years played in the NBA prior to the draft
- ^{b} Never played a game for the franchise
- ^{c} Never played in the NBA prior to the expansion draft
