= 1966–67 San Francisco Warriors season =

NBA professional basketball team season

- Division champions
- Head coach: Bill Sharman
- Arena: Civic Auditorium, Cow Palace

Results
- Record: 44–37 (.543)
- Place: Division: 1st (Western)
- Playoff finish: NBA Finals (eliminated 2–4)
- Stats at Basketball Reference

The 1966–67 San Francisco Warriors season was the 21st for the Warriors in the NBA, fifth in the San Francisco Bay Area and one of the most successful in franchise history. On the heels of a 35–45 record and fourth-place finish the previous season, new head coach Bill Sharman quickly put his imprint on the team in training camp. True to his Boston Celtics roots, he placed an emphasis on physical condition and the fast break, which allowed his team to get a jump on the rest of the league. Led by All-Stars Rick Barry and Nate Thurmond, the Warriors shot out to a 12-6 start that put it at the top of the division for the rest of the season. Included was a seven-game win streak, the longest since their move from Philadelphia four years earlier. The Warriors went on to capture the Western Division title with a 44–37 mark, third best in the league. Barry led all players with a 35.7-points-per-game average, while Thurmond (21.3) ranked second in rebounds.

On Jan. 10, the Warriors hosted the NBA All-Star Game for the first time since their move from Philadelphia. In front of a sellout crowd of 13,972 fans and national television audience, the West squad upset the East by a 135-120 score at the Cow Palace. Barry captured Most Valuable Player honors with 38 points, the second most in league history.

Fatigue and assorted health issues slowed the Warriors down the stretch, but they were able to regroup in time for the playoffs. In the first two rounds, they swept the short-handed Los Angeles Lakers in three games then dispatched the St. Louis Hawks in six. In the NBA Finals, the Warriors fell to the heavily favored Philadelphia 76ers in six games, but not before Barry averaged 40.3 points to set the league record for a championship series.

== Offseason ==
Prior to the regular season, the Warriors sent backcourt leader Guy Rodgers to the expansion Chicago Bulls in return for veteran guards Jim King and Jeff Mullins plus cash. Not only did the fresh, young legs of King and Mullins made for the up-tempo offense, but they also provided much-needed depth in the backcourt. Meanwhile, the absence of Rodgers put the ball in the hands of Barry at the offensive end most often.

For Rodgers, the transaction marked the conclusion of an eight-year tenure with the club. In addition to the Bulls, he played for the Cincinnati Royals, and the Milwaukee Bucks. King played with the Warriors for three seasons before he was dealt to the Cincinnati Royals early in the 1969-79 campaign. Mullins became a core piece for the team for ten seasons before his retirement after the 1975-1976 season.

Earlier in the offseason, the Warriors signed center Bill McGill, who was placed on waivers before the season opener. They also purchased swingman Bob Warlick from the Detroit Pistons.

=== Draft picks ===
Round	Pick	Player	Position	Nationality	College
1	3	Clyde Lee	C/F	United States	Vanderbilt
2	13	Joe Ellis	F	United States	San Francisco
3	23	Stephen Chubin	G	United States	Rhode Island
4	33	Stephen Vacendak	G	United States	Duke
5	43	Tom Kerwin	F	United States	Centenary
6	53	Jim Pitts		United States	Northwestern
7	62	Lon Hughey		United States	Fresno State
8	71	Ken Washington	G	United States	UCLA

== Roster ==
1966–67 San Francisco Warriors roster
Players

Pos.	No.	Player	Height	Weight	DOB	From
G	16	Al Attles	6 ft 0 in (1.83 m)	175 lb (79 kg)		North Carolina A&T
F	24	Rick Barry	6 ft 7 in (2.01 m)	205 lb (93 kg)		Miami (FL)
F	31	Joe Ellis	6 ft 6 in (1.98 m)	175 lb (79 kg)		San Francisco
F	44	Fred Hetzel	6 ft 8 in (2.03 m)	220 lb (100 kg)		Davidson
G	21	Jim King	6 ft 2 in (1.88 m)	175 lb (79 kg)		Tulsa
F	35	Rudy LaRusso	6 ft 7 in (2.01 m)	220 lb (100 kg)		Dartmouth
F	47	Dave Lattin	6 ft 6 in (1.98 m)	225 lb (102 kg)		UTEP
F/C	43	Clyde Lee	6 ft 10 in (2.08 m)	205 lb (93 kg)		Vanderbilt
G/F	9	George Lee	6 ft 4 in (1.93 m)	200 lb (91 kg)		Michigan
F	14	Tom Meschery	6 ft 6 in (1.98 m)	215 lb (98 kg)		Saint Mary's
G	23	Jeff Mullins	6 ft 4 in (1.93 m)	190 lb (86 kg)		Duke
F/C	42	Nate Thurmond	6 ft 11 in (2.11 m)	225 lb (102 kg)		Bowling Green

Coaches
Head coach
- Bill Sharman (USC)
Assistant(s)
- George Lee (Michigan)

Legend
- (DP) Unsigned draft pick
- (FA) Free agent
- (S) Suspended
- Injured

== Regular season ==
=== Season standings ===
Western Division	W	L	PCT	GB	Home	Road	Neutral	Div
x-San Francisco Warriors	44	37	.543	–	18–10	11–19	15–8	24–12
x-St. Louis Hawks	39	42	.481	5	18–11	12–21	9–10	21–15
x-Los Angeles Lakers	36	45	.444	8	21–18	12–20	3–7	14–22
x-Chicago Bulls	33	48	.407	11	17–19	9–17	7–12	17–19
Detroit Pistons	30	51	.370	14	12–18	9–19	9–14	14–22

x – clinched playoff spot

=== Game log ===
1966–67 game log
#	Date	Opponent	Score	High points	Record
1	October 15	@ Boston	113–121	Rick Barry (41)	0–1
2	October 18	@ Chicago	116–119	Rick Barry (32)	0–2
3	October 20	N Chicago	121–111	Rick Barry (43)	1–2
4	October 21	Detroit	119–136	Rick Barry (37)	2–2
5	October 23	N Detroit	110–119	Rick Barry (36)	2–3
6	October 28	@ Baltimore	105–104	Rick Barry (28)	3–3
7	October 29	@ Cincinnati	127–115	Rick Barry (57)	4–3
8	November 1	@ Chicago	137–121	Rick Barry (29)	5–3
9	November 3	@ New York	108–123	Rick Barry (32)	5–4
10	November 4	@ Philadelphia	129–134	Rick Barry (46)	5–5
11	November 5	@ St. Louis	120–122	Rick Barry (31)	5–6
12	November 6	Baltimore	117–120	Rick Barry (43)	6–6
13	November 9	Baltimore	122–128	Rick Barry (47)	7–6
14	November 11	Los Angeles	93–132	Rick Barry (27)	8–6
15	November 13	Detroit	96–135	Rick Barry (45)	9–6
16	November 14	Detroit	104–115	Rick Barry (44)	10–6
17	November 19	@ Los Angeles	144–109	Rick Barry (45)	11–6
18	November 21	N St. Louis	117–134	Rick Barry (42)	12–6
19	November 22	N Baltimore	117–125	Nate Thurmond (29)	12–7
20	November 23	N Baltimore	120–110	Rick Barry (40)	13–7
21	November 24	@ Philadelphia	123–140	Rick Barry (36)	13–8
22	November 26	Chicago	129–131	Rick Barry (37)	14–8
23	November 29	N Chicago	108–101	Rick Barry (40)	15–8
24	December 3	St. Louis	111–123	Rick Barry (45)	16–8
25	December 6	@ New York	126–116	Rick Barry (47)	17–8
26	December 7	@ Baltimore	106–116	Nate Thurmond (30)	17–9
27	December 8	N St. Louis	106–124	Rick Barry (50)	18–9
28	December 9	@ Los Angeles	119–118	Rick Barry (49)	19–9
29	December 10	Cincinnati	120–123 (OT)	Rick Barry (36)	20–9
30	December 13	Cincinnati	126–112	Rick Barry (33)	20–10
31	December 17	Boston	118–110	Rick Barry (33)	20–11
32	December 20	Los Angeles	107–130	Nate Thurmond (23)	21–11
33	December 22	Philadelphia	116–114	Rick Barry (30)	21–12
34	December 25	@ Cincinnati	124–112	Rick Barry (50)	22–12
35	December 26	N St. Louis	120–111	Rick Barry (32)	22–13
36	December 28	@ Baltimore	138–115	Paul Neumann (30)	23–13
37	December 30	N Cincinnati	107–102	Paul Neumann (26)	24–13
38	January 3	Boston	126–121 (OT)	Rick Barry (31)	24–14
39	January 5	N Los Angeles	122–91	Nate Thurmond (24)	25–14
40	January 6	St. Louis	118–129	Nate Thurmond (30)	26–14
41	January 7	Boston	108–110	Nate Thurmond (34)	27–14
42	January 11	@ Los Angeles	126–141	Rick Barry (32)	27–15
43	January 12	New York	123–127	Rick Barry (41)	28–15
44	January 13	N New York	117–119	Jeff Mullins (28)	28–16
45	January 14	@ Detroit	136–121	Rick Barry (50)	29–16
46	January 15	@ St. Louis	112–114	Rick Barry (48)	29–17
47	January 18	N Chicago	107–111	Nate Thurmond (27)	29–18
48	January 19	N New York	123–102	Tom Meschery (28)	30–18
49	January 20	St. Louis	115–142	Rick Barry (27)	31–18
50	January 24	Baltimore	125–146	Rick Barry (35)	32–18
51	January 27	Baltimore	116–143	Rick Barry (39)	33–18
52	January 29	@ Cincinnati	118–121	Rick Barry (37)	33–19
53	January 30	N Boston	108–121	Rick Barry (32)	33–20
54	January 31	N Detroit	108–106	Nate Thurmond (23)	34–20
55	February 2	N Philadelphia	137–120	Rick Barry (49)	35–20
56	February 3	@ Los Angeles	80–129	Rick Barry (17)	35–21
57	February 4	N Philadelphia	127–140	Fred Hetzel (34)	35–22
58	February 5	@ Chicago	142–141 (OT)	Rick Barry (48)	36–22
59	February 7	N Philadelphia	123–126	Rick Barry (41)	36–23
60	February 10	@ Boston	136–137 (2OT)	Rick Barry (43)	36–24
61	February 11	@ New York	122–125 (OT)	Rick Barry (36)	36–25
62	February 12	@ Detroit	127–134	Rick Barry (49)	36–26
63	February 14	N Boston	128–122	Rick Barry (50)	37–26
64	February 16	N Chicago	125–124	Rick Barry (52)	38–26
65	February 18	N Boston	130–124	Rick Barry (29)	39–26
66	February 21	N Los Angeles	136–133	Rick Barry (34)	40–26
67	February 24	Cincinnati	137–122	Rick Barry (46)	40–27
68	February 25	Cincinnati	129–116	Rick Barry (35)	40–28
69	February 28	@ New York	123–127	Rick Barry (36)	40–29
70	March 1	@ Boston	125–137	Rick Barry (33)	40–30
71	March 2	@ Philadelphia	128–136	Rick Barry (37)	40–31
72	March 4	N New York	111–102	Rick Barry (34)	41–31
73	March 5	New York	115–103	Jim King (25)	41–32
74	March 10	St. Louis	111–105	Rick Barry (38)	41–33
75	March 11	Los Angeles	125–120	Rick Barry (29)	41–34
76	March 13	Detroit	109–135	Rick Barry (29)	42–34
77	March 14	Philadelphia	139–110	Rick Barry (23)	42–35
78	March 16	Philadelphia	131–145	Jeff Mullins (31)	43–35
79	March 17	@ Chicago	117–120	Rick Barry (26)	43–36
80	March 18	@ Cincinnati	112–127	Rick Barry (22)	43–37
81	March 19	@ Detroit	135–127	Rick Barry (39)	44–37

== Playoffs ==
1967 playoff game log
Division Semifinals: 3–0 (home: 2–0; road: 1–0)

Game	Date	Team	Score	High points	High rebounds	High assists	Location Attendance	Series
1	March 21	Los Angeles	W 124–108	Jim King (22)	Nate Thurmond (20)	King, Barry (6)	Oakland–Alameda County Coliseum Arena; 11,106	1–0
2	March 23	@ Los Angeles	W 113–102	Rick Barry (26)	Nate Thurmond (24)	Nate Thurmond (7)	Los Angeles Memorial Sports Arena; 11,335	2–0
3	March 26	Los Angeles	W 122–115	Rick Barry (37)	Nate Thurmond (21)	Rick Barry (7)	Cow Palace; 5,845	3–0

Division Finals: 4–2 (home: 3–0; road: 1–2)

Game	Date	Team	Score	High points	High rebounds	High assists	Location Attendance	Series
1	March 30	St. Louis	W 117–115	Rick Barry (38)	Nate Thurmond (14)	Jeff Mullins (7)	Cow Palace; 7,813	1–0
2	April 1	St. Louis	W 143–136	Rick Barry (47)	Nate Thurmond (17)	Rick Barry (6)	Cow Palace; 12,337	2–0
3	April 5	@ St. Louis	L 109–115	Rick Barry (31)	Nate Thurmond (21)	Jeff Mullins (6)	Kiel Auditorium; 8,042	2–1
4	April 8	@ St. Louis	L 104–109	Jeff Mullins (40)	Nate Thurmond (21)	Jeff Mullins (4)	Kiel Auditorium; 10,016	2–2
5	April 10	St. Louis	W 123–102	Rick Barry (25)	Nate Thurmond (27)	Fred Hetzel (6)	Cow Palace; 10,311	3–2
6	April 12	@ St. Louis	W 112–107	Rick Barry (41)	Nate Thurmond (21)	Rick Barry (5)	Kiel Auditorium; 8,004	4–2

NBA Finals: 2–4 (home: 1–2; road: 1–2)

Game	Date	Team	Score	High points	High rebounds	High assists	Location Attendance	Series
1	April 14	@ Philadelphia	L 135–141 (OT)	Rick Barry (37)	Nate Thurmond (31)	Rick Barry (7)	Philadelphia Convention Hall; 9,283	0–1
2	April 16	@ Philadelphia	W 95–126	Rick Barry (30)	Nate Thurmond (29)	Jim King (6)	Philadelphia Convention Hall; 9,426	0–2
3	April 18	Philadelphia	W 130–124	Rick Barry (55)	Nate Thurmond (25)	Jim King (6)	Cow Palace; 14,773	1–2
4	April 20	Philadelphia	L 108–122	Rick Barry (43)	Nate Thurmond (25)	Nate Thurmond (5)	Cow Palace; 15,117	1–3
5	April 23	@ Philadelphia	W 117–109	Rick Barry (36)	Nate Thurmond (28)	Al Attles (6)	Philadelphia Convention Hall; 10,229	2–3
6	April 24	Philadelphia	L 122–125	Rick Barry (44)	Nate Thurmond (22)	Jim King (7)	Cow Palace; 15,612	2–4

1967 schedule

== Awards and records ==
- Rick Barry, NBA All-Star Game Most Valuable Player Award
- Rick Barry, NBA All-Star Game
- Nate Thurmond, NBA All-Star Game
- Rick Barry, NBA Scoring Champion
- Rick Barry, All-NBA First Team
