= 1966–67 Chicago Bulls season =

NBA professional basketball team season (inaugural season)

- Head coach: Johnny "Red" Kerr
- General manager: Dick Klein
- Owner: Dick Klein
- Arena: International Amphitheatre

Results
- Record: 33–48 (.407)
- Place: Division: 4th (Western)
- Playoff finish: Division semifinals (lost to Hawks 0–3)
- Stats at Basketball Reference

Local media
- Television: WGN-TV (Jack Brickhouse, Vince Lloyd)
- Radio: WGN (Lou Boudreau, Vince Lloyd)

The 1966–67 Chicago Bulls season was the first for the expansion franchise in the National Basketball Association (NBA) after failed attempts by the Chicago Stags and Packers-turned-Zephyrs to bring pro basketball to the second-largest market in the country. While not an artistic success—the so-called "Baby Bulls" routinely played to half capacity at the 9,000-seat International Amphitheater on the near South Side—the debut proved to be memorable and even historic just the same.

General manager-team owner Dick Klein and his modest staff assembled a scrappy group of players whose play style reflected the blue-collar nature of the city itself. The Bulls finished the regular season with a 33–48 record, the best ever by an NBA expansion team at the time, which resulted in a playoff berth making them the first team in professional sports to secure a post-season berth on its first try.

== Draft picks ==
Note: This is not an extensive list; it only covers the first and second rounds, and any other players drafted by the franchise that played at least one NBA game.

Round	Pick	Player	Position	Nationality	School/Club team
1	10	Dave Schellhase	G	United States	Purdue
2	20	Erwin Mueller	F/C	United States	San Francisco

== Roster ==
1966–67 Chicago Bulls roster
Players

Pos.	No.	Player	Height	Weight	DOB	From
F	19	Bob Boozer	6 ft 8 in (2.03 m)	215 lb (98 kg)	1937-04-26	Kansas State
C	12	Nate Bowman	6 ft 10 in (2.08 m)	230 lb (104 kg)	1943-03-19	Wichita State
F	16	Barry Clemens	6 ft 6 in (1.98 m)	210 lb (95 kg)	1943-05-01	Ohio Wesleyan
F	15	Keith Erickson	6 ft 5 in (1.96 m)	195 lb (88 kg)	1944-04-19	UCLA
F	9	Don Kojis	6 ft 3 in (1.91 m)	202 lb (92 kg)	1939-01-15	Marquette
F	18	McCoy McLemore	6 ft 7 in (2.01 m)	230 lb (104 kg)	1942-04-03	Drake
C	14	Erwin Mueller	6 ft 8 in (2.03 m)	230 lb (104 kg)	1944-03-12	San Francisco
G	5	Guy Rodgers	6 ft 0 in (1.83 m)	185 lb (84 kg)	1935-09-01	Temple
G	8	Dave Schellhase	6 ft 3 in (1.91 m)	205 lb (93 kg)	1944-10-14	Purdue
G	4	Jerry Sloan	6 ft 5 in (1.96 m)	195 lb (88 kg)	1942-03-28	Evansville
G	6	Gerry Ward	6 ft 4 in (1.93 m)	195 lb (88 kg)	1941-09-06	Boston College
F	7	Jim Washington	6 ft 6 in (1.98 m)	210 lb (95 kg)	1943-07-01	Villanova
C	17	George Wilson	6 ft 8 in (2.03 m)	225 lb (102 kg)	1942-05-09	Cincinnati

Coaches
Head coach
- Johnny "Red" Kerr
Assistant(s)
- Al Bianchi

Legend
- (DP) Unsigned draft pick
- (FA) Free agent
- (S) Suspended
- Injured

Roster
Updated: November 25, 1966

== Regular season ==
The expansion draft left the Bulls with a roster full of untested and past-their-prime candidates. First-rounder Dave Schellhase spent his first season on the bench, and only Erwin Mueller made a contribution among the 10 picks. Nonetheless, the ability of head coach Johnny "Red" Kerr and his assistant-former teammate Al Bianchi to get the most out of the group allowed them to be relevant from the start. Even though Kerr had never coached at the pro level previously, his extensive experience as a player with the Syracuse Nationals, Philadelphia 76ers and Baltimore Bullets and affable personality served him well in the face of some trying times.

The Bulls broke out of the gate quickly on October 15 with a 104–97 road win over the St. Louis Hawks that raised eyebrows around the league. Beforehand, Hawks coach Richie Guerin had predicted the expansion club would not win more than 20 games the entire season. The starting lineup on opening night included center Len Chappell, forwards Bob Boozer and Don Kojis and guards Jerry Sloan and Guy Rodgers, a three-time All-Star and most established player on the roster. Rodgers led the way with a game-high 37 points in the inaugural victory.

The Bulls extended their record to 2–0 in a 119–116 victory over the San Francisco Warriors at the Amphitheater. Behind 34 points and 18 assists by Rodgers, they extended the win streak to three games in a 134–124 triumph over the defending Western Division champions Los Angeles Lakers at home. A lack of star power and inside presence brought the team down to the Earth before long, but not before it surprised the basketball world with a postseason berth.

Kerr was named Coach of the Year, while Mueller earned a spot on the All-Rookie Team. Rodgers led the league in assists with 11.2 per game (including a club record 24 against the New York Knicks on December 21) and paced the team in scoring at 18.0 points per game. Rodgers and Sloan represented the team in the NBA All-Star Game.

== Postseason ==
The first appearance for the Bulls in the playoffs was a brief one. The more talented and experienced St. Louis Hawks swept them in three games. Their only home date in the series (Game 3) was moved from the International Amphitheater to the Chicago Coliseum because of a schedule conflict.

=== Season standings ===
Western Division	W	L	PCT	GB	Home	Road	Neutral	Div
x-San Francisco Warriors	44	37	.543	–	18–10	11–19	15–8	24–12
x-St. Louis Hawks	39	42	.481	5	18–11	12–21	9–10	21–15
x-Los Angeles Lakers	36	45	.444	8	21–18	12–20	3–7	14–22
x-Chicago Bulls	33	48	.407	11	17–19	9–17	7–12	17–19
Detroit Pistons	30	51	.370	14	12–18	9–19	9–14	14–22

=== Game log ===
1966–67 game log
#	Date	Opponent	Score	High points	Record
1	October 15	@ St. Louis	104–97	Guy Rodgers (36)	1–0
2	October 18	San Francisco	116–119	Jerry Sloan (26)	2–0
3	October 19	Los Angeles	124–134	Guy Rodgers (34)	3–0
4	October 20	N San Francisco	121–111	Guy Rodgers (26)	3–1
5	October 21	@ Los Angeles	108–101	Keith Erickson (20)	4–1
6	October 23	New York	124–105	Bob Boozer (20)	4–2
7	October 27	N Boston	100–123	Jerry Sloan (25)	4–3
8	October 28	N Detroit	129–117	Bob Boozer (31)	4–4
9	November 1	San Francisco	137–121	Erwin Mueller (31)	4–5
10	November 2	Baltimore	94–102	Erwin Mueller (26)	5–5
11	November 3	N Boston	108–137	Guy Rodgers (16)	5–6
12	November 5	@ Cincinnati	113–99	Jerry Sloan (22)	6–6
13	November 6	St. Louis	102–134	Keith Erickson (22)	7–6
14	November 8	Boston	112–101	Jerry Sloan (21)	7–7
15	November 9	New York	103–98	Guy Rodgers (36)	7–8
16	November 11	@ Philadelphia	113–126	Bob Boozer (22)	7–9
17	November 13	Philadelphia	132–126	Guy Rodgers (35)	7–10
18	November 15	@ St. Louis	99–107	Bob Boozer (18)	7–11
19	November 17	@ Baltimore	102–120	Guy Rodgers (24)	7–12
20	November 18	N Philadelphia	145–120	Barry Clemens (16)	7–13
21	November 19	@ New York	104–116	Bob Boozer (19)	7–14
22	November 23	@ Los Angeles	130–154	Guy Rodgers (25)	7–15
23	November 25	@ Los Angeles	121–117	Bob Boozer (17)	8–15
24	November 26	@ San Francisco	129–131	Don Kojis (24)	8–16
25	November 29	N San Francisco	108–101	Bob Boozer (19)	8–17
26	December 3	@ Detroit	98–104	Bob Boozer (29)	8–18
27	December 6	@ Philadelphia	119–129	Keith Erickson (28)	8–19
28	December 7	Philadelphia	117–103	Jim Washington (20)	8–20
29	December 8	N Baltimore	132–120	Bob Boozer (30)	9–20
30	December 10	@ Boston	110–125	Jerry Sloan (25)	9–21
31	December 13	N Baltimore	94–122	Jerry Sloan (30)	9–22
32	December 14	N Detroit	87–93	Jerry Sloan (17)	10–22
33	December 16	N Cincinnati	120–128	Jerry Sloan (30)	11–22
34	December 17	@ Baltimore	110–106	Jerry Sloan (27)	12–22
35	December 19	N St. Louis	97–102	Jerry Sloan (24)	13–22
36	December 21	New York	107–110	Boozer, Kojis (22)	14–22
37	December 23	Detroit	103–102	Guy Rodgers (27)	14–23
38	December 25	@ New York	132–133	Bob Boozer (40)	14–24
39	December 26	Baltimore	96–108	Guy Rodgers (34)	15–24
40	December 30	Boston	110–106	Bob Boozer (26)	15–25
41	January 3	Cincinnati	111–116	Guy Rodgers (39)	16–25
42	January 4	@ Philadelphia	115–136	Boozer, Mueller (20)	16–26
43	January 6	@ Detroit	135–126	Guy Rodgers (30)	17–26
44	January 7	@ Cincinnati	112–125	Erwin Mueller (25)	17–27
45	January 8	Philadelphia	117–108	Erwin Mueller (26)	17–28
46	January 11	Cincinnati	106–102	Jerry Sloan (28)	17–29
47	January 13	@ Boston	102–122	Bob Boozer (19)	17–30
48	January 14	Los Angeles	121–122	Guy Rodgers (39)	18–30
49	January 15	New York	116–131	Bob Boozer (33)	19–30
50	January 17	Boston	109–101	Jerry Sloan (28)	19–31
51	January 18	N San Francisco	107–111	Jim Washington (19)	20–31
52	January 19	N Philadelphia	127–102	Don Kojis (17)	20–32
53	January 20	Detroit	124–125 (OT)	Bob Boozer (27)	21–32
54	January 22	Baltimore	114–118	Bob Boozer (26)	22–32
55	January 24	Detroit	108–95	Guy Rodgers (21)	22–33
56	January 25	St. Louis	103–102	Boozer, Sloan (18)	22–34
57	January 29	Los Angeles	142–122	Bob Boozer (29)	22–35
58	February 3	Cincinnati	113–118	Don Kojis (23)	23–35
59	February 4	@ St. Louis	111–119	Jerry Sloan (18)	23–36
60	February 5	San Francisco	142–141 (OT)	Bob Boozer (32)	23–37
61	February 7	Detroit	98–90	McCoy McLemore (23)	23–38
62	February 8	N New York	106–103	Boozer, Sloan (25)	23–39
63	February 10	N New York	122–121	Jim Washington (21)	23–40
64	February 11	St. Louis	104–98	Jerry Sloan (24)	23–41
65	February 12	@ Los Angeles	121–129	Don Kojis (42)	23–42
66	February 16	N San Francisco	125–124	Bob Boozer (22)	23–43
67	February 19	@ Los Angeles	133–119	Jerry Sloan (31)	24–43
68	February 22	N New York	103–117	Bob Boozer (23)	25–43
69	February 26	@ Baltimore	106–124	Don Kojis (18)	25–44
70	March 1	N Philadelphia	122–129	Jerry Sloan (22)	26–44
71	March 2	N Boston	108–114	Bob Boozer (20)	26–45
72	March 4	@ St. Louis	125–122	Boozer, Mueller (20)	27–45
73	March 5	Cincinnati	106–113	Guy Rodgers (29)	28–45
74	March 7	Boston	114–117	Guy Rodgers (22)	29–45
75	March 10	Baltimore	115–132	Don Kojis (22)	30–45
76	March 11	@ Cincinnati	119–147	Guy Rodgers (16)	30–46
77	March 13	Cincinnati	133–117	Bob Boozer (29)	30–47
78	March 14	St. Louis	111–98	Jerry Sloan (30)	30–48
79	March 15	@ Detroit	98–91	Jerry Sloan (32)	31–48
80	March 17	San Francisco	117–120	Erwin Mueller (27)	32–48
81	March 19	Los Angeles	109–122	Bob Boozer (24)	33–48

== Playoffs ==
1967 playoff game log
Division semifinals: 0–3 (home: 0–1; road: 0–2)

Game	Date	Team	Score	High points	High rebounds	High assists	Location Attendance	Series
1	March 21	@ St. Louis	L 100–114	Kojis, Boozer (18)	Bob Boozer (13)	Rodgers, Clemens (2)	Kiel Auditorium; 4,704	0–1
2	March 23	St. Louis	L 107–113	Bob Boozer (25)	Kojis, Boozer (11)	Guy Rodgers (11)	International Amphitheatre; 3,739	0–2
3	March 25	@ St. Louis	L 106–119	McCoy McLemore (18)	Bob Boozer (11)	Guy Rodgers (5)	Kiel Auditorium; 7,018	0–3

1967 schedule

== Awards and records ==
- Johnny "Red" Kerr, NBA Coach of the Year Award
- Erwin Mueller, NBA All-Rookie Team 1st Team
- Guy Rodgers, NBA All-Star Game
- Jerry Sloan, NBA All-Star Game
