= 1966–67 St. Louis Hawks season =

NBA professional basketball team season

- Head coach: Richie Guerin
- Arena: Kiel Auditorium

Results
- Record: 39–42 (.481)
- Place: Division: 2nd (Western)
- Playoff finish: West Division Finals (Eliminated 2–4)
- Stats at Basketball Reference

The 1966–67 St. Louis Hawks season was the Hawks' 18th season in the NBA as well as the 12th and penultimate season in St. Louis.

== Regular season ==
After the Hawks extended the Western Division champions Los Angeles Lakers to seven games in the 1966 playoffs, they entered the new season with reason for optimism. But on Nov. 8, in the ninth game of the season, All-Star center Zelmo Beaty was injured early in a 135–121 victory against the Knicks in New York and sat out nine weeks as a result. When Beaty returned in mid-January, the team had an 18–21 record and little if any hope to catch the upstart San Francisco Warriors in the division race. The Hawks swept the expansion Chicago Bulls in three games in the first round of the playoffs before they were ousted by the Warriors in six games in the finals.

=== Season standings ===
Western Division	W	L	PCT	GB	Home	Road	Neutral	Div
x-San Francisco Warriors	44	37	.543	–	18–10	11–19	15–8	24–12
x-St. Louis Hawks	39	42	.481	5	18–11	12–21	9–10	21–15
x-Los Angeles Lakers	36	45	.444	8	21–18	12–20	3–7	14–22
x-Chicago Bulls	33	48	.407	11	17–19	9–17	7–12	17–19
Detroit Pistons	30	51	.370	14	12–18	9–19	9–14	14–22

x – clinched playoff spot

=== Game log ===
1966–67 Game log
#	Date	Opponent	Score	High points	Record
1	October 15	Chicago	104–97	Richie Guerin (25)	0–1
2	October 20	@ Detroit	113–105	Zelmo Beaty (31)	1–1
3	October 21	@ Philadelphia	110–119	Richie Guerin (28)	1–2
4	October 22	Cincinnati	123–133 (OT)	Lenny Wilkens (31)	2–2
5	October 27	@ Cincinnati	118–121	Lenny Wilkens (22)	2–3
6	October 29	Los Angeles	109–110	Bill Bridges (27)	3–3
7	November 3	N Philadelphia	108–120	Zelmo Beaty (32)	3–4
8	November 5	San Francisco	120–122	Zelmo Beaty (25)	4–4
9	November 6	@ Chicago	102–134	Lou Hudson (21)	4–5
10	November 8	@ New York	135–121	Bill Bridges (29)	5–5
11	November 12	Boston	92–115	Bill Bridges (25)	6–5
12	November 15	Chicago	99–107	Lenny Wilkens (30)	7–5
13	November 16	@ Detroit	104–101	Bill Bridges (22)	8–5
14	November 19	Detroit	87–105	Lou Hudson (26)	9–5
15	November 21	N San Francisco	117–134	Guerin, Wilkens (21)	9–6
16	November 23	@ Boston	103–123	Bridges, Wilkens (21)	9–7
17	November 24	Boston	101–78	Lou Hudson (20)	9–8
18	November 26	Los Angeles	133–126	Joe Caldwell (31)	9–9
19	November 29	@ Philadelphia	116–137	Bumper Tormohlen (27)	9–10
20	December 2	New York	107–109	Joe Caldwell (23)	10–10
21	December 3	@ San Francisco	111–123	Joe Caldwell (27)	10–11
22	December 4	@ Los Angeles	123–118	Richie Guerin (33)	11–11
23	December 7	@ Los Angeles	128–130 (OT)	Joe Caldwell (29)	11–12
24	December 8	N San Francisco	106–124	Bill Bridges (26)	11–13
25	December 10	Philadelphia	133–123	Bill Bridges (35)	11–14
26	December 15	N Boston	116–114	Lenny Wilkens (32)	12–14
27	December 16	@ Philadelphia	113–124	Lou Hudson (27)	12–15
28	December 17	@ New York	114–116	Bill Bridges (31)	12–16
29	December 19	N Chicago	97–102	Lou Hudson (34)	12–17
30	December 21	N Baltimore	118–109	Joe Caldwell (22)	13–17
31	December 23	@ Boston	103–114	Bumper Tormohlen (21)	13–18
32	December 26	N San Francisco	120–111	Lou Hudson (33)	14–18
33	December 27	Baltimore	111–113	Bill Bridges (30)	15–18
34	December 29	Boston	112–110	Lou Hudson (22)	15–19
35	January 1	New York	105–128	Bill Bridges (31)	16–19
36	January 2	N Detroit	122–120	Richie Guerin (41)	17–19
37	January 4	@ Los Angeles	101–122	Joe Caldwell (30)	17–20
38	January 6	@ San Francisco	118–129	Guerin, Thorn (22)	17–21
39	January 8	Detroit	115–117	Richie Guerin (25)	18–21
40	January 12	@ Baltimore	116–137	Lou Hudson (30)	18–22
41	January 13	@ Philadelphia	107–125	Beaty, Hudson (25)	18–23
42	January 14	@ Cincinnati	105–116	Zelmo Beaty (25)	18–24
43	January 15	San Francisco	112–114	Zelmo Beaty (26)	19–24
44	January 16	N Baltimore	98–100	Joe Caldwell (26)	19–25
45	January 18	@ Los Angeles	123–121 (OT)	Zelmo Beaty (32)	20–25
46	January 20	@ San Francisco	115–142	Hudson, Thorn (22)	20–26
47	January 21	New York	124–114	Bill Bridges (17)	20–27
48	January 22	New York	101–104	Bridges, Guerin, Hudson, Wilkens (18)	21–27
49	January 23	N Philadelphia	105–112	Joe Caldwell (22)	21–28
50	January 25	@ Chicago	103–102	Beaty, Wilkens (21)	22–28
51	January 28	@ Cincinnati	112–113	Lenny Wilkens (23)	22–29
52	January 29	Philadelphia	108–114	Richie Guerin (29)	23–29
53	January 30	N Los Angeles	106–99	Lenny Wilkens (28)	24–29
54	January 31	@ New York	120–139	Lou Hudson (31)	24–30
55	February 3	@ Boston	131–113	Richie Guerin (41)	25–30
56	February 4	Chicago	111–119	Lou Hudson (29)	26–30
57	February 5	@ Detroit	104–114	Lenny Wilkens (23)	26–31
58	February 6	N Baltimore	98–107	Lenny Wilkens (25)	26–32
59	February 7	N Baltimore	109–96	Richie Guerin (25)	27–32
60	February 11	@ Chicago	104–98	Richie Guerin (28)	28–32
61	February 12	Cincinnati	115–118	Lenny Wilkens (28)	29–32
62	February 13	N New York	139–109	Zelmo Beaty (25)	30–32
63	February 16	@ New York	120–121	Richie Guerin (30)	30–33
64	February 17	@ Baltimore	133–132	Hudson, Wilkens (25)	31–33
65	February 19	Philadelphia	123–122	Lou Hudson (38)	31–34
66	February 20	N Cincinnati	104–112	Zelmo Beaty (26)	31–35
67	February 21	Detroit	112–109	Bridges, Hudson (24)	31–36
68	February 25	Los Angeles	134–133 (OT)	Lenny Wilkens (34)	31–37
69	February 26	Boston	130–119	Zelmo Beaty (34)	31–38
70	February 27	N Detroit	105–94	Richie Guerin (25)	32–38
71	March 1	@ Baltimore	112–122	Zelmo Beaty (24)	32–39
72	March 4	Chicago	125–122	Rod Thorn (26)	32–40
73	March 5	Baltimore	103–132	Zelmo Beaty (38)	33–40
74	March 6	N Cincinnati	122–129	Lou Hudson (41)	33–41
75	March 8	@ Los Angeles	106–104	Lenny Wilkens (37)	34–41
76	March 10	@ San Francisco	111–105	Richie Guerin (29)	35–41
77	March 12	Cincinnati	119–120	Lou Hudson (38)	36–41
78	March 13	N Boston	123–122	Lou Hudson (24)	37–41
79	March 14	@ Chicago	111–98	Bill Bridges (30)	38–41
80	March 16	N Cincinnati	111–114	Paul Silas (26)	38–42
81	March 18	Detroit	99–102	Lou Hudson (22)	39–42

== Playoffs ==
1967 playoff game log
Division Semifinals: 3–0 (home: 2–0; road: 1–0)

Game	Date	Team	Score	High points	High rebounds	High assists	Location Attendance	Series
1	March 21	Chicago	W 114–100	Lou Hudson (26)	Bridges, Silas (14)	Lenny Wilkens (6)	Kiel Auditorium; 4,704	1–0
2	March 23	@ Chicago	W 113–107	Lou Hudson (29)	Bill Bridges (12)	Richie Guerin (6)	International Amphitheatre; 3,739	2–0
3	March 25	Chicago	W 119–106	Lenny Wilkens (27)	Bill Bridges (28)	Lenny Wilkens (8)	Kiel Auditorium; 7,018	3–0

Division Finals: 2–4 (home: 2–1; road: 0–3)

Game	Date	Team	Score	High points	High rebounds	High assists	Location Attendance	Series
1	March 30	@ San Francisco	L 115–117	Lou Hudson (36)	Bill Bridges (21)	Lenny Wilkens (6)	Cow Palace; 7,813	0–1
2	April 1	@ San Francisco	L 136–143	Bill Bridges (26)	Bill Bridges (22)	Lenny Wilkens (9)	Cow Palace; 12,337	0–2
3	April 5	San Francisco	W 115–109	Bill Bridges (25)	Bill Bridges (32)	Lenny Wilkens (7)	Kiel Auditorium; 8,042	1–2
4	April 8	San Francisco	W 109–104	Joe Caldwell (24)	Bill Bridges (17)	Lenny Wilkens (11)	Kiel Auditorium; 10,016	2–2
5	April 10	@ San Francisco	L 102–123	Richie Guerin (19)	Bill Bridges (17)	Lenny Wilkens (7)	Cow Palace; 10,311	2–3
6	April 12	San Francisco	L 107–112	Zelmo Beaty (28)	Zelmo Beaty (16)	Lenny Wilkens (6)	Kiel Auditorium; 8,004	2–4

1967 schedule
