= McCoy McLemore =

American basketball player (1942–2009)

Personal information
- Born: April 3, 1942 Houston, Texas, U.S.
- Died: April 30, 2009 (aged 67) Houston, Texas, U.S.
- Listed height: 6 ft 7 in (2.01 m)
- Listed weight: 230 lb (104 kg)

Career information
- High school: Jack Yates (Houston, Texas)
- College: Moberly Area CC (1960–1962); Drake (1962–1964)
- NBA draft: 1964: 3rd round, 23rd overall pick
- Drafted by: San Francisco Warriors
- Playing career: 1964–1972
- Position: Power forward / center
- Number: 71, 32, 18, 34, 23, 35, 9

Career history
- 1964–1966: San Francisco Warriors
- 1966–1968: Chicago Bulls
- 1968: Phoenix Suns
- 1968–1970: Detroit Pistons
- 1970–1971: Cleveland Cavaliers
- 1971: Milwaukee Bucks
- 1971–1972: Houston Rockets

Career highlights
- NBA champion (1971); First team All-MVC (1964)

Career statistics
- Points: 5,130 (8.8 ppg)
- Rebounds: 3,161 (5.5 rpg)
- Assists: 733 (1.3 apg)
- Stats at NBA.com
- Stats at Basketball Reference

McCoy McLemore Jr. (April 3, 1942 – April 30, 2009) was an American professional basketball player in the National Basketball Association (NBA) in the 1960s and 1970s. He played college basketball for the Drake Bulldogs before being selected by the San Francisco Warriors in the third round of the 1964 NBA draft. McLemore Jr. also played for the Chicago Bulls, Phoenix Suns, Detroit Pistons, Cleveland Cavaliers, Milwaukee Bucks, and Houston Rockets before retiring in 1972.

== Basketball career ==
=== Early years ===
Born in Houston, Texas, McLemore attended Houston's Jack Yates High School.

=== College ===
McLemore first attended Moberly Area Community College, but then transferred to Drake University, leading his team to be co-Missouri Valley Conference champions. McLemore was inducted posthumously into the National Junior College Athletic Association Basketball Hall of Fame in 2011.

=== Professional career ===
He was a third-round pick by the San Francisco Warriors in the 1964 NBA draft. McLemore was a member of the Chicago Bulls' inaugural team after being selected in the 1966 NBA expansion draft. Two years later, the Phoenix Suns drafted McLemore in the 1968 NBA expansion draft. In the middle of the 1968 season, he was traded to the Detroit Pistons. 1970 marked the third time McLemore was selected in an expansion draft, this time by the Cleveland Cavaliers. The Cavailers then traded McLemore to the Milwaukee Bucks, where Eddie Doucette described him as "a good rebounder off the bench." The Bucks waived McLemore in November 1971, and the Houston Rockets signed him in December 1971. The Rockets did not renew his contract for the 1972 season.

== NBA career statistics ==
Legend
GP	Games played	GS	Games started	MPG	Minutes per game
FG%	Field goal percentage	3P%	3-point field goal percentage	FT%	Free throw percentage
RPG	Rebounds per game	APG	Assists per game	SPG	Steals per game
BPG	Blocks per game	PPG	Points per game	**Bold**	Career high
†	Won an NBA championship	*	Led the league

=== Regular season ===
Year	Team	GP	GS	MPG	FG%	3P%	FT%	RPG	APG	SPG	BPG	PPG
1964–65	San Francisco	78	-	22.2	.337	-	.714	6.3	1.0	-	-	8.3
1965–66	San Francisco	**80***	-	18.3	.426	-	.743	6.1	0.7	-	-	7.4
1966–67	Chicago	79	-	17.5	.385	-	.772	4.7	0.8	-	-	9.2
1967–68	Chicago	76	-	27.6	.398	-	.779	5.7	1.7	-	-	**12.7**
1968–69	Phoenix	31	-	22.9	.385	-	.773	5.4	1.6	-	-	11.8
1968–69	Detroit	50	-	18.2	.396	-	.808	4.7	0.9	-	-	7.3
1969–70	Detroit	73	-	19.5	**.466**	-	.821	4.6	1.1	-	-	8.0
1970–71	Cleveland	58	-	**31.7**	.388	-	.773	**8.0**	**3.0**	-	-	11.7
1970–71†	Milwaukee	28	-	14.8	.368	-	.829	3.8	1.1	-	-	4.7
1971–72	Milwaukee	10	-	9.9	.321	-	**.917**	3.4	1.2	-	-	2.9
1971–72	Houston	17	-	8.6	.442	-	.750	2.3	0.6	-	-	2.8
Career		580	-	21.1	.394	-	.771	5.5	1.3	-	-	8.8

=== Playoffs ===
Year	Team	GP	GS	MPG	FG%	3P%	FT%	RPG	APG	SPG	BPG	PPG
1966–67	Chicago	3	-	15.0	**.400**	-	**.867**	3.0	**1.3**	-	-	**12.3**
1967–68	Chicago	5	-	**28.4**	.388	-	.762	**4.8**	1.0	-	-	10.8
1970–71†	Milwaukee	**10**	-	5.2	.250	-	.500	1.6	0.8	-	-	0.7
Career		18	-	13.3	.374	-	.789	2.7	0.9	-	-	5.4

== Post-career life ==
McLemore was a color analyst in the late 1980s for Rockets' television broadcasts on Home Sports Entertainment.

McLemore was a regular with the Bill Glass Ministries Prison Weekends All-Star Team.

== Death ==
McLemore died of cancer, aged 67, on April 30, 2009.
