= Guy Rodgers =

American basketball player (1935–2001)

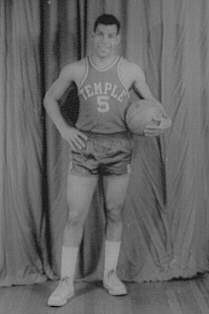
- Rodgers in 1958

Personal information
- Born: September 1, 1935 Philadelphia, Pennsylvania, U.S.
- Died: February 19, 2001 (aged 65) Los Angeles, California, U.S.
- Listed height: 6 ft 0 in (1.83 m)
- Listed weight: 185 lb (84 kg)

Career information
- High school: Northeast (Philadelphia, Pennsylvania)
- College: Temple (1955–1958)
- NBA draft: 1958: territorial pick
- Drafted by: Philadelphia Warriors
- Playing career: 1958–1970
- Position: Point guard
- Number: 25, 5

Career history
- 1958–1966: Philadelphia / San Francisco Warriors
- 1966–1967: Chicago Bulls
- 1967–1968: Cincinnati Royals
- 1968–1970: Milwaukee Bucks

Career highlights
- 4× NBA All-Star (1963, 1964, 1966, 1967); 2× NBA assists leader (1963, 1967); Consensus first-team All-American (1958); Consensus second-team All-American (1957); 3× Robert V. Geasey Trophy winner (1956–1958); No. 5 retired by Temple Owls

Career statistics
- Points: 10,415 (11.7 ppg)
- Rebounds: 3,791 (4.3 rpg)
- Assists: 6,917 (7.8 apg)
- Stats at NBA.com
- Stats at Basketball Reference
- Basketball Hall of Fame

Guy William Rodgers Jr. (September 1, 1935 – February 19, 2001) was an American professional basketball player born in Philadelphia. He spent twelve years (1958–1970) in the NBA, and was one of the league's best playmakers in the early to mid-1960s. Rodgers led the NBA in assists twice, and placed second six times. Rodgers was inducted into Naismith Memorial Basketball Hall of Fame in 2014.

== Early life ==
Rodgers was born on September 1, 1935, in Philadelphia, Pennsylvania. He attended Northeast High School in Philadelphia, graduating in 1954. He played on the school's basketball team, under coach Ike Wooley, who had played at Temple University in the late 1920s with Harry Litwack. Rodgers played center in high school. He averaged nearly 35 points a game as a senior. Rodgers was also known as an excellent ball-handler. As a high school senior, he was named Philadelphia's Player of the Year (over sophomore Wilt Chamberlain).

In 1953, Rodgers's Northeast team lost to Chamberlain's Overbrook High School in the 1953 Philadelphia Public League championship game. Chamberlain scored 34 points, and Rodgers scored 26 in an excellent all-around performance in playmaking and defense as well as scoring. All of Northeast's starting five players fouled out of the game trying to defend Chamberlain.

== College basketball ==
Rodgers thought about attending Seton Hall University and playing under coach Honey Russell, but his mother had died and coach Wooley believed it would be better for Rodgers, his father and sister for Rodgers to stay in Philadelphia. Rodgers took the advice and remained in Philadelphia, playing collegiately for Temple University's varsity basketball team from 1955 to 1958 under Naismith Memorial Hall of Fame coach Harry Litwack. (Freshmen could not play on the varsity at the time.) Rodgers admired Litwack's qualities as a human being, and Litwack had a great impact on his life; including applying Litwack's business advice to his life after Rodgers's basketball career ended.

Rodgers was only 6 ft (1.83 m), but he was very strong, including in his legs. He came into Temple with excellent dribbling, passing and playmaking skills, with which Litwack did not tamper. Litwack saw Rodgers's only weakness as the lack of an outside shot. During Rodgers's sophomore season (1955–56), he teamed in the backcourt with fellow Philadelphian, senior Hal Lear (who had attended Overbrook High School like Chamberlain, and had played with Rodgers on Philadelphia's public basketball courts).

Lear averaged 24 points per game, and Rodgers 18.5 points per game. The Lear-Rodgers backcourt is considered among the best, or the best, in Philadelphia college basketball history. Philadelphia basketball figure Sonny Hill had stated they should be considered among the greatest in all of college basketball. College basketball coach and commentator Dick Vitale described the pair as magical together.

Over his three years, Rodgers led Temple to a 74–16 record and third-place finishes in the 1956 NCAA basketball tournament, 1957 National Invitation Tournament and the 1958 NCAA basketball tournament. He was named to the 1958 All-Tournament Team. In the 1958 tournament, Temple lost to eventual champion Kentucky, 61–60, in a Final Four game played in Louisville, Kentucky. Just two seasons earlier, Rodgers and Lear's Temple team had shocked Kentucky by defeating Kentucky in its home opener, while being subjected to racial taunts over Temple's black and white players sharing the same water and towels. Rodgers believed that Temple would have won the 1958 game had it been played anywhere else. Temple was ranked No. 5 in the Associated Press's (AP) final poll in 1958.

Rodgers averaged 20.4 points, 6.4 assists and 7 rebounds a game as a junior (1956–57), and 20.1 points, 5.2 assists and 6.6 rebounds as a senior (1957–58). He became the school's leading career scorer with 1,767 points (19.6 points per game). Rodgers remains the third leading scorer in Temple history (through the 2024–25 season). He was one of the first players to pass off the dribble. He was known for rarely making a turnover. Playing with Rodgers, Lear observed Rodgers's rare ability to run and dribble, see the whole court, and pass.

Rodgers was a second-team consensus All-American as a junior in 1956–57, and a first-team consensus All-American in 1957–58 as a senior. The Associated Press named Rodgers a third-team All-American in 1956–57, and a first-team All-American in 1957–58. That 1958 AP team consisted of four Naismith Basketball Hall of Fame inductees: Rodgers at Temple, Elgin Baylor of Seattle University, fellow Philadelphia native Chamberlain of the University of Kansas, and Oscar Robertson of the University of Cincinnati. The other was Don Hennon of the University of Pittsburgh.

In Philadelphia college sports, he was the three-time winner of the Robert V. Geasey Trophy for Big Five Most Valuable Player (1956–58).

== NBA career ==
Rodgers' renown in the NBA came as a passer. From the 1952-53 through the 1966–67 seasons, only Bob Cousy, Oscar Robertson and Rodgers led the NBA in assists; and Rodgers finished second to them six times. He was an all-around player, who was an excellent defender, and is among less than ten players in NBA history who have averaged at least 10 points, seven assists and four rebounds over an entire career.

=== Philadelphia/San Francisco Warriors ===
Rodgers was a territorial pick of the Philadelphia Warriors in the 1958 NBA draft. He was 6 ft (1.83 m), 185 pounds (83.9 kg). As a rookie, he played alongside two other Philadelphia territorial picks, future Hall of Famers Paul Arizin and Tom Gola. Rodgers started at point guard, averaging 10.7 points, 5.8 assists and 6.2 rebounds per game.

The Warriors had selected Chamberlain in an amended version of the territorial draft in 1955, when he was still in high school. Chamberlain joined the Warriors for the 1959–60 season. Rodgers averaged 11.6 points, 7.1 assists and 5.8 rebounds per game. He was second in assists in the NBA, behind only Boston Celtics' Hall of Fame guard Bob Cousy. Chamberlain was named Rookie of the Year and the NBA's Most Valuable Player, averaging 37.6 points and 27 rebounds per game. The Warriors' record went from 32 to 40 in 1958–59 to 49–26, and they reached the Eastern Division Finals of the playoffs; losing to the Boston Celtics two games to four. Rodgers averaged 12.3 points, 6.7 assists and 6.2 rebounds per game against the Celtics. In the Game 6 loss to end the Celtics series, Rodgers had 31 points, 10 rebounds and nine assists; with the Celtics winning 119–117 on a last second tip-in by Tommy Heinsohn.

The following season (1960–61), Rodgers averaged 8.7 assists per game, second in the NBA behind future Hall of Fame guard Oscar Robertson. He also averaged 12.8 points and 6.5 rebounds per game. In 1961–62, Rodgers averaged eight assists per game, with Hall of Famer Al Attles sharing some point guard duties. Rodgers was again second in the NBA in assists behind Robertson. On March 2, 1962, Chamberlain famously had a 100-point game, with Rodgers recording 20 assists. The Warriors lost again to the Celtics in the Eastern Division Finals, three games to four; Rodgers averaging 13.6 points, 7.6 assists and 5.9 rebounds per game over the seven-game series.

After three years as second in assists league-wide, Rodgers led the NBA in assists in the 1962–63 season at 10.4 per game; almost a full assist above second place Robertson (9.5). He was named an All-Star for the first time. In an October 26, 1962 game against the Detroit Pistons, the 6 ft tall Rodgers had 23 points, 20 rebounds and 17 assists (with Chamberlain scoring 50 points). On March 14, 1963, Rodgers tied Bob Cousy's NBA record of 28 assists in a single game. This remained a league record until 1978, when broken by Kevin Porter with 29. In 1963–64, he was again named an All-Star, averaging seven assists per game; once more second only to Robertson in assists.

The Warriors had moved from Philadelphia to San Francisco a year earlier, and were now in the Western Division. They defeated the St. Louis Hawks in the 1964 Western Division Finals (4–3). Rodgers averaged 13.3 points, 8.3 assists and 6.3 rebounds per game in that series. The Warriors lost in five game to the Celtics in the 1964 NBA finals, Rodgers averaging 10.8 points and 6.4 assists per game in that series.

In January 1965, the Warriors traded Chamberlain to the Philadelphia 76ers. Rodgers had played alongside Chamberlain with the Warriors from 1959 through 1964, and parts of the 1964–65 season. Without Chamberlain, the team finished 17–63, but Rodgers still averaged a league second-best 7.2 assists per game, behind just Robertson again, and a then career-high 14.6 points per game.

In his final season with the Warriors (1965–66), Rodgers made the All-Star team for a third time. He averaged a career-high 18.6 points per game, and then career-high 10.7 assists per game, to go along with 5.3 rebounds per game. Once more, he was second to Robertson league-wide in assists. The Warriors record improved to 35–45, with Nate Thurmond taking over at center for the full season and rookie-of-the-year Rick Barry joining the team; both of whom would enter the Hall of fame.

=== Chicago Bulls ===
Rodgers was traded on September 7, 1966, to the expansion Chicago Bulls for two players to be named later (Jim King and Jeff Mullins) and cash. Both King and Mullins had been selected by the Bulls in the 1966 expansion draft. The trade led the NBA to change the rules so that expansion teams were not permitted to make trades for one year after entering the league.

Coach Johnny "Red" Kerr let Rodgers run the Bulls offense most of the time. Rodgers averaged 18.0 points and handed out a then-NBA record 908 assists (11.2 per game), leading the league in assists for a second time (Robertson being second). The 908 assists and 11.2 assists per game are still the Chicago Bulls single-season records. His achieving the assist record established that his prowess as a playmaker was based on his own skill, and not simply a fortuity of playing alongside Wilt Chamberlain.

Along with backcourt partner and fellow 1966-67 All-Star (and future Hall of Fame coach) Jerry Sloan, the so-called "Baby Bulls" had a 33–48 record and reached the playoffs in their first year. The Bulls are the first and only expansion team to reach the playoffs in their first season. Both Rodgers and Sloan were selected to the Western Division All-Star team; Rodgers as a starter. This was the fourth and final All-Star appearance for Rodgers.

Rodgers teammates included forward Don Kojis. Rodgers and Kojis worked together and "introduced the back door baseline lob slam dunk to the NBA", which became the team's most popular play that year in Chicago. The precise origins of the lob slam dunk (alley-oop) are not wholly clear. Among other claims, basketball legend Bill Russell and K.C. Jones are said to have developed the alley-oop, or a version of it, at the University of San Francisco in the 1950s.

=== Cincinnati Royals ===
Four games into the 1967–68 season, Rodgers was traded to the Cincinnati Royals for Flynn Robinson, draft picks and cash, joining Oscar Robertson in the backcourt. Now a backup point guard, Rodgers played less than 19 minutes per game for the Royals.

=== Milwaukee Bucks ===
The next season, Rodgers was left unprotected by the Royals in the NBA expansion draft, and he was selected by new Milwaukee Bucks. The Bucks first coach Larry Costello believed Rodgers would be a key player for the Bucks, and would get to play more than he did behind Robertson in Cincinnati. In his first Bucks season (1968–69), Rodgers shared time at point guard with Flynn Robinson, for whom he had earlier been traded. Robinson led the team in scoring and Rodgers led the team in assists with 6.9 per game in less than 27 minutes per game. He finished 5th in assists in the NBA, the four players ahead of him all being full-time starters, and future Hall of Famers, at point-guard (Robertson, Lenny Wilkens, Walt Frazier and Dave Bing).

The following season, future Hall of Fame and top-75 all-time great center Kareem Abdul-Jabbar, the overall first selection in the 1969 NBA draft, joined the Bucks. The 1969-70 Bucks improved by 29 games, with a regular season record of 56–26, finishing second in the Eastern Division. They were in the playoffs for the first time, in only the team's second year, and had their first playoff series victory during the 1970 NBA playoffs against the Philadelphia 76ers. The Bucks reached the Eastern division finals, losing to the New York Knicks in five games, who would go on to win the 1970 NBA championship.

This was Rodgers final NBA season. As a back up point guard to Robinson, he played about 12 minutes per game, averaging 3.3 assists. Rodgers came off the bench during the season to spark Bucks' rallies in games. In the Bucks very first playoff game in team history, against the 76ers, Rodgers came off the bench in the fourth quarter to calm a jittery team, helping lead the Bucks to victory with his passing and ball handling. He played in three games during the five-game series, averaging 3.7 assists in 12.3 minutes of play. In the series loss to the Knicks, he played about eight minutes per game in four of the five series games, averaging 2.5 assists and 2.3 points per game. Rodgers was key in the Bucks one win over the Knicks, coming off the bench to break through the Knicks tight defense.

In April 1970, the Bucks acquired Oscar Robertson in a trade for Flynn Robinson and Charley Paulk. Rodgers retired in September 1970, before the start of the NBA season. The Bucks went on to win their first NBA Championship in the 1970–71 season.

== Legacy ==
Over his career, Rodgers averaged 7.8 assists, 11.7 points and 4.3 rebounds per game, in 892 regular season games. He averaged 6.3 assists per game in 46 playoff games. He is in the NBA top-20 players all-time in career assists per game average. At the time he retired, Rodgers 6,907 or 6,917 assists were third most in NBA history, behind Cousy and Robertson. He ranks 23rd in NBA history in total assists (through the 2024–25 season), just behind Cousy.

Rodgers remains one of the few players in NBA history to have played for at least two expansion teams during their inaugural season.

Attles said of Rodgers, he never worried about the defender covering him, no matter how great; he was still able to see the whole court and make the proper pass. Attles also said, "'I don't know if Guy was the best point guard or playmaker, but I don't know who was any better'". Chamberlain thought Rodgers "'was the best ball-handler I ever saw—better than Cousy or Jerry West or Oscar Robertson or Walt Frazier or Peter Maravich or anyone'". Hall of fame forward Chet Walker said Rodgers "'was a great player, maybe better than Cousy. He never got his proper due'". Robertson called him an "'Excellent leader'". "Without question Guy Rodgers was the best passer I ever played with or against. Pete Maravich was close, but Guy was better. He made every play exciting", said basketball TV analyst Jon McGlocklin, who was a teammate of Rodgers in Milwaukee.

== Tags ==
2014 Hall of Fame

== NBA career statistics ==
Legend
GP	Games played	GS	Games started	MPG	Minutes per game
FG%	Field goal percentage	3P%	3-point field goal percentage	FT%	Free throw percentage
RPG	Rebounds per game	APG	Assists per game	SPG	Steals per game
BPG	Blocks per game	PPG	Points per game	**Bold**	Career high
*	Led the league

=== Regular season ===
Year	Team	GP	MPG	FG%	FT%	RPG	APG	PPG
1958–59	Philadelphia	45	34.8	**.394**	.545	6.2	5.8	10.7
1959–60	Philadelphia	68	36.5	.389	.613	5.8	7.1	11.6
1960–61	Philadelphia	78	37.2	.386	.687	**6.5**	8.7	12.8
1961–62	Philadelphia	80*	33.1	.356	.665	4.4	8.0	8.2
1962–63	San Francisco	79	**41.4**	.387	.727	5.0	10.4*	13.9
1963–64	San Francisco	79	34.1	.365	.707	4.2	7.0	11.0
1964–65	San Francisco	79	34.2	.380	.686	4.1	7.2	14.6
1965–66	San Francisco	79	36.7	.373	.727	4.3	10.7	**18.6**
1966–67	Chicago	**81***	37.8	.391	.806	4.3	**11.2***	18.0
1967–68	Chicago	4	32.3	.296	**.818**	3.5	7.0	10.3
1967–68	Cincinnati	75	18.9	.355	.803	1.8	4.7	4.8
1968–69	Milwaukee	**81**	26.6	.377	.793	2.8	6.9	10.3
1969–70	Milwaukee	64	11.7	.356	.744	1.2	3.3	3.2
Career		892	32.1	.378	.721	4.3	7.8	11.7

=== Playoffs ===
Year	Team	GP	MPG	FG%	FT%	RPG	APG	PPG
1960	Philadelphia	9	**41.1**	.360	.556	**8.6**	6.0	13.1
1961	Philadelphia	3	40.3	.368	.550	7.0	5.0	**17.7**
1962	Philadelphia	**12**	40.2	.359	.636	5.9	7.3	11.6
1964	San Francisco	**12**	34.9	.329	.702	4.8	**7.5**	12.3
1967	Chicago	3	32.3	**.375**	**.800**	2.0	6.0	11.3
1970	Milwaukee	7	9.7	.286	.750	0.6	3.0	2.4
Career		46	33.8	.350	.640	5.2	6.2	11.0

== Honors ==
- Rodgers was a 2014 inductee to the Naismith Memorial Basketball Hall of Fame. During ceremonies on August 8, 2014. Earl Monroe served as Rodgers' presenter. His son Tony, accepted on behalf of the Rodgers family.
- Rodgers is one of four Temple retired jersey numbers. His #5 hangs in the Liacouras Center. Teammate Hal Lear (#6), Mark Macon (#12) and Bill Mlkvy (#20) are the others.
- Rogers was inducted into the Temple Athletic Hall of Fame in 1971.
- Rodgers was a charter member of the Philadelphia Big Five Hall of Fame in 1973.
- The Philadelphia Sports Hall of Fame inducted Rogers in 2005.
- Rodgers received the Living Legend Sports Award from the Philadelphia Sports Writers Association in 1990.

== Personal life ==
After retiring, Rodgers worked in personnel labor and industrial relations for Xerox Corporation in Los Angeles.

== Death ==
Rodgers died on February 19, 2001, at age 65 after a heart attack. He was survived by sons Tony and Mark, and daughter Nicole.

== See also ==
- List of National Basketball Association career assists leaders
- List of National Basketball Association players with most assists in a game
