= 1966–67 Los Angeles Lakers season =

NBA professional basketball team season

- Head coach: Fred Schaus
- General manager: Louis Mohs
- Owner: Jack Kent Cooke
- Arena: Los Angeles Memorial Sports Arena

Results
- Record: 36–45 (.444)
- Place: Division: 3rd (Western)
- Playoff finish: Division semifinals (lost to Warriors 0–3)
- Stats at Basketball Reference

The 1966–67 Los Angeles Lakers season was their 19th season in the NBA and seventh season in Los Angeles. Plagued by health issues and inexperience -- superstars Elgin Baylor and Jerry West sat out 26 games between them -- the Lakers got off to a 3–10 start from which they never recovered.

The situation grew contentious in mid-January, when in the midst of a season-long decline, veteran Rudy LaRusso refused to report to the Detroit Pistons as part of a three-team trade. Team management had second thoughts about the transaction, but the commissioner's office declined to cancel it. LaRusso sat out the remainder of the season before the Pistons sold his rights to the San Francisco Warriors. The Lakers were awarded a bonus pick (15th overall) in the 1969 draft as compensation.

Head coach Fred Schaus and his team hoped to atone for their dismal regular season in the playoffs, but it never came to be. They were swept by the upstart San Francisco Warriors in three games in the Western Division semifinals, which saw West play only the first minute of the final game before he was lost for the series.

The otherwise disappointing campaign had this positive development: Jerry Chambers and Archie Clark made regular contributions in their pro debuts. Clark finished third in the Rookie of the Year vote.

This season was the last for the familiar blue-and white-uniforms with cursive script that read "Los Angeles" on the fronts of the home and away versions. They had been in place since the team moved to the West Coast in 1960. One year later, the color combination was changed to purple and gold with "Lakers" on the front of each model. It has remained there ever since.

The campaign also marked the farewell of the Los Angeles Memorial Sports Arena as the Lakers home. The facility was replaced by The Forum early in the 1967-68 season.

== Roster ==
1966–67 Los Angeles Lakers roster
Players

Pos.	No.	Player	Height	Weight	DOB	From
PF	23	Jim Barnes	6 ft 8 in (2.03 m)	210 lb (95 kg)	1941-04-13	UTEP
SF	22	Elgin Baylor	6 ft 5 in (1.96 m)	225 lb (102 kg)	1934-09-16	Seattle
PF	34	John Block	6 ft 9 in (2.06 m)	207 lb (94 kg)	1944-04-16	USC
SF	40	Jerry Chambers	6 ft 5 in (1.96 m)	185 lb (84 kg)	1943-07-18	Utah
SG	21	Archie Clark	6 ft 2 in (1.88 m)	175 lb (79 kg)	1941-07-15	Minnesota
C	31	Mel Counts	7 ft 0 in (2.13 m)	230 lb (104 kg)	1941-10-16	Oregon State
C	15	Henry Finkel	7 ft 0 in (2.13 m)	240 lb (109 kg)	1942-04-20	Dayton
SG	11	Gail Goodrich	6 ft 1 in (1.85 m)	170 lb (77 kg)	1943-04-23	UCLA
SF	33	Tom Hawkins	6 ft 5 in (1.96 m)	210 lb (95 kg)	1936-12-22	Notre Dame
PG	42	Walt Hazzard	6 ft 2 in (1.88 m)	185 lb (84 kg)	1942-04-15	UCLA
C	14	Darrall Imhoff	6 ft 10 in (2.08 m)	220 lb (100 kg)	1938-10-11	California
PF	35	Rudy LaRusso	6 ft 8 in (2.03 m)	220 lb (100 kg)	1937-11-11	Dartmouth
PG	44	Jerry West	6 ft 3 in (1.91 m)	175 lb (79 kg)	1938-05-28	West Virginia

Coaches
Head coach
- Fred Schaus

Legend
- (DP) Unsigned draft pick
- (FA) Free agent
- (S) Suspended
- Injured

Roster
Updated: January 16, 1967

== Regular season ==
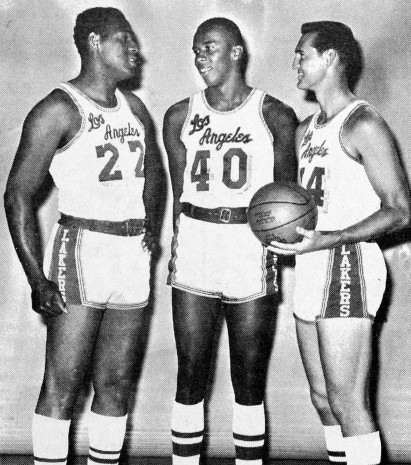
Los Angeles Lakers players (from left to right) Elgin Baylor, Jerry Chambers and Jerry West during the 1966 pre-season.

=== Season standings ===
Western Division	W	L	PCT	GB	Home	Road	Neutral	Div
x-San Francisco Warriors	44	37	.543	–	18–10	11–19	15–8	24–12
x-St. Louis Hawks	39	42	.481	5	18–11	12–21	9–10	21–15
x-Los Angeles Lakers	36	45	.444	8	21–18	12–20	3–7	14–22
x-Chicago Bulls	33	48	.407	11	17–19	9–17	7–12	17–19
Detroit Pistons	30	51	.370	14	12–18	9–19	9–14	14–22

x – clinched playoff spot

=== Game log ===
1966–67 game log
#	Date	Opponent	Score	High points	Record
1	October 15	@ Baltimore	126–115	Elgin Baylor (36)	1–0
2	October 18	@ New York	119–122	Elgin Baylor (31)	1–1
3	October 19	@ Chicago	124–134	Elgin Baylor (45)	1–2
4	October 21	Chicago	108–101	Elgin Baylor (29)	1–3
5	October 26	New York	133–122	Elgin Baylor (31)	1–4
6	October 28	New York	114–124	Hazzard, LaRusso (24)	2–4
7	October 29	@ St. Louis	109–110	Rudy LaRusso (26)	2–5
8	October 30	N Detroit	121–124	Walt Hazzard (33)	2–6
9	November 2	@ Boston	108–133	Jerry Chambers (24)	2–7
10	November 4	Baltimore	98–131	Goodrich, LaRusso (21)	3–7
11	November 8	Baltimore	104–102	Gail Goodrich (21)	3–8
12	November 10	Detroit	133–132 (OT)	Jerry West (36)	3–9
13	November 11	@ San Francisco	93–132	Jerry Chambers (15)	3–10
14	November 12	Detroit	88–144	Jerry West (35)	4–10
15	November 16	N Cincinnati	124–112	LaRusso, West (36)	5–10
16	November 18	@ Detroit	118–121	Jerry West (37)	5–11
17	November 19	San Francisco	144–109	Elgin Baylor (30)	5–12
18	November 23	Chicago	130–154	Jerry West (37)	6–12
19	November 25	Chicago	121–117	Elgin Baylor (32)	6–13
20	November 26	@ St. Louis	133–126	Jerry West (36)	7–13
21	November 29	@ New York	114–118	Elgin Baylor (33)	7–14
22	November 30	@ Baltimore	126–111	Jerry West (38)	8–14
23	December 2	@ Philadelphia	130–138	Elgin Baylor (37)	8–15
24	December 3	@ Cincinnati	130–118	Jerry West (36)	9–15
25	December 4	St. Louis	123–118	Jerry West (39)	9–16
26	December 7	St. Louis	128–130 (OT)	Elgin Baylor (46)	10–16
27	December 9	San Francisco	119–118	Jerry West (39)	10–17
28	December 11	Cincinnati	118–119	Jerry West (37)	11–17
29	December 14	Cincinnati	126–124	Elgin Baylor (28)	11–18
30	December 18	Boston	125–127	Jerry West (35)	12–18
31	December 20	@ San Francisco	107–130	Elgin Baylor (21)	12–19
32	December 21	Philadelphia	129–123	Jerry West (40)	12–20
33	December 23	Philadelphia	118–107	Elgin Baylor (30)	12–21
34	December 26	@ Boston	106–121	Baylor, West (24)	12–22
35	December 28	@ New York	115–121	Jerry West (31)	12–23
36	December 29	@ Cincinnati	125–114	Elgin Baylor (40)	13–23
37	January 1	Boston	110–111	Jerry West (35)	14–23
38	January 4	St. Louis	101–122	Jerry West (35)	15–23
39	January 5	N San Francisco	122–91	Jerry West (21)	15–24
40	January 6	Boston	99–102	Jerry West (22)	16–24
41	January 8	N New York	121–118	Jerry West (31)	16–25
42	January 11	San Francisco	126–141	Jerry West (44)	17–25
43	January 13	N Cincinnati	115–125	Jerry West (33)	17–26
44	January 14	@ Chicago	121–122	Elgin Baylor (34)	17–27
45	January 15	@ Detroit	127–116	Jerry West (39)	18–27
46	January 18	St. Louis	123–121 (OT)	Elgin Baylor (29)	18–28
47	January 20	@ Philadelphia	108–119	Elgin Baylor (34)	18–29
48	January 21	@ Baltimore	119–126	Jerry West (35)	18–30
49	January 22	@ Boston	120–121 (OT)	Baylor, West (25)	18–31
50	January 25	Baltimore	115–128	Jerry West (45)	19–31
51	January 28	Baltimore	118–133	Elgin Baylor (31)	20–31
52	January 29	@ Chicago	142–122	Jerry West (28)	21–31
53	January 30	N St. Louis	106–99	Jerry West (33)	21–32
54	February 1	Philadelphia	133–143	Elgin Baylor (44)	22–32
55	February 3	San Francisco	80–129	Elgin Baylor (25)	23–32
56	February 5	Philadelphia	130–123	Jerry West (26)	23–33
57	February 7	@ New York	122–117	Elgin Baylor (34)	24–33
58	February 8	N Baltimore	121–108	Jerry West (40)	25–33
59	February 10	@ Philadelphia	131–148	Gail Goodrich (21)	25–34
60	February 12	Chicago	121–129	Jerry West (33)	26–34
61	February 15	Boston	114–124	Elgin Baylor (39)	27–34
62	February 17	Boston	120–119	Elgin Baylor (29)	27–35
63	February 19	Chicago	133–119	Baylor, West (27)	27–36
64	February 21	N San Francisco	136–133	Jerry West (36)	27–37
65	February 22	Cincinnati	102–103	Jerry West (32)	28–37
66	February 24	@ Detroit	101–102	Elgin Baylor (35)	28–38
67	February 25	@ St. Louis	134–133 (OT)	Jerry West (42)	29–38
68	February 26	Cincinnati	127–141	Jerry West (34)	30–38
69	February 28	N Detroit	119–117	Jerry West (34)	31–38
70	March 1	@ Cincinnati	116–122	Elgin Baylor (30)	31–39
71	March 3	New York	132–138	Jerry West (34)	32–39
72	March 5	@ Boston	105–130	Elgin Baylor (18)	32–40
73	March 6	N Philadelphia	119–117	Jerry West (23)	32–41
74	March 7	@ New York	131–119	Jerry West (33)	33–41
75	March 8	St. Louis	106–104	Jerry West (34)	33–42
76	March 10	Detroit	103–118	Gail Goodrich (24)	34–42
77	March 11	@ San Francisco	125–120	Elgin Baylor (34)	35–42
78	March 12	Detroit	120–104	Baylor, Clark (23)	35–43
79	March 15	Philadelphia	138–123	Gail Goodrich (26)	35–44
80	March 17	@ Baltimore	135–133	Elgin Baylor (25)	36–44
81	March 19	@ Chicago	109–122	Counts, Goodrich (16)	36–45

== Playoffs ==
1967 playoff game log
Division semifinals: 0–3 (home: 0–1; road: 0–2)

Game	Date	Team	Score	High points	High rebounds	High assists	Location Attendance	Series
1	March 21	@ San Francisco	L 108–124	Archie Clark (26)	Elgin Baylor (12)	Clark, Imhoff (4)	Oakland–Alameda County Coliseum Arena; 11,106	0–1
2	March 23	San Francisco	L 102–113	Archie Clark (24)	Darrall Imhoff (10)	three players tied (5)	Los Angeles Memorial Sports Arena; 11,335	0–2
3	March 26	@ San Francisco	L 115–122	Elgin Baylor (37)	Elgin Baylor (18)	Walt Hazzard (8)	Cow Palace; 5,845	0–3

1967 schedule

== Awards and records ==
- Elgin Baylor, All-NBA First Team
- Jerry West, All-NBA First Team
- Elgin Baylor, NBA All-Star Game
- Jerry West, NBA All-Star Game
- Darrall Imhoff, NBA All-Star Game
