= Gerry Ward (basketball) =

American basketball player (1941–2026)

Personal information
- Born: September 6, 1941
- Died: April 10, 2026 (aged 84)
- Listed height: 6 ft 4 in (1.93 m)
- Listed weight: 195 lb (88 kg)

Career information
- High school: Cardinal Hayes (Bronx, New York)
- College: Boston College (1960–1963)
- NBA draft: 1963: 1st round, 5th overall pick
- Drafted by: St. Louis Hawks
- Playing career: 1963–1967
- Position: Shooting guard
- Number: 40, 4, 12, 6

Career history
- 1963–1964: St. Louis Hawks
- 1964–1965: Boston Celtics
- 1965–1966: Philadelphia 76ers
- 1966–1967: Chicago Bulls

Career highlights
- NBA champion (1965)

Career NBA statistics
- Points: 542 (3.2 ppg)
- Rebounds: 294 (1.7 rpg)
- Assists: 237 (1.4 apg)
- Stats at NBA.com
- Stats at Basketball Reference

Gerald W. Ward (September 6, 1941 – April 10, 2026) was an American professional basketball player.

== Biography ==
A 6'4" (1.93 m) guard, Ward starred at Boston College from 1960 to 1963. He scored 1,112 points over the course of his collegiate career, and grabbed 947 rebounds. As a senior, he was an All-American third team selection and an Academic All-American first team honoree.

Ward was selected by the St. Louis Hawks with the fifth pick of the 1963 NBA draft. He played four seasons in the NBA with the Hawks, Boston Celtics, Philadelphia 76ers, and Chicago Bulls, averaging 3.2 points per game.

In 2007, Boston College retired Ward's #40 jersey. He died on April 10, 2026, at the age of 84.

== Career statistics ==
Legend
GP	Games played	GS	Games started	MPG	Minutes per game
FG%	Field goal percentage	3P%	3-point field goal percentage	FT%	Free throw percentage
RPG	Rebounds per game	APG	Assists per game	SPG	Steals per game
BPG	Blocks per game	PPG	Points per game	**Bold**	Career high

=== NBA ===
==== Regular season ====
Year	Team	GP	MPG	FG%	FT%	RPG	APG	PPG
1963–64	St. Louis	24	5.8	.302	.647	.9	.9	1.8
1964–65	Boston	3	10.0	.111	**1.000**	1.7	**2.0**	1.7
1965–66	Philadelphia	66	12.7	.354	.650	1.3	1.2	2.6
1966–67	Chicago	**76**	**13.7**	**.381**	.630	**2.4**	1.7	**4.2**
Career		169	12.1	.356	.639	1.7	1.4	3.2

==== Playoffs ====
Year	Team	GP	MPG	FG%	FT%	RPG	APG	PPG
1964	St. Louis	**6**	2.7	**.500**	**1.000**	.0	.3	1.8
1966	Philadelphia	5	8.8	.250	.000	1.0	.2	.8
1967	Chicago	3	**19.3**	.375	.500	**1.7**	**2.7**	**4.7**
Career		14	8.4	.382	.500	.7	.8	2.1
