= Barry Clemens =

American basketball player (1943–2026)

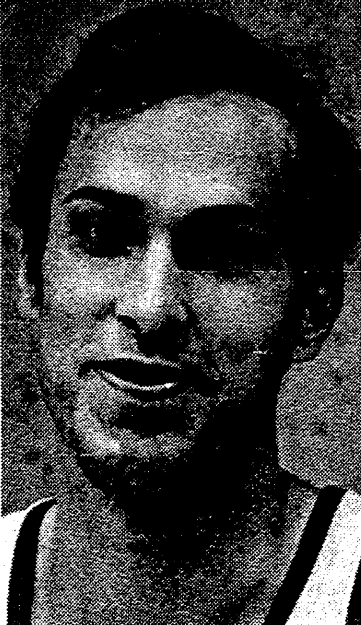

Personal information
- Born: May 1, 1943 Dayton, Ohio, U.S.
- Died: October 26, 2026 (aged 83) Cleveland, Ohio, U.S.
- Listed height: 6 ft 6 in (1.98 m)
- Listed weight: 210 lb (95 kg)

Career information
- High school: Xenia (Xenia, Ohio)
- College: Ohio Wesleyan (1961–1965)
- NBA draft: 1965: 3rd round, 19th overall pick
- Drafted by: New York Knicks
- Playing career: 1965–1976
- Position: Power forward
- Number: 10, 16, 43, 40

Career history
- 1965–1966: New York Knicks
- 1966–1969: Chicago Bulls
- 1969–1972: Seattle SuperSonics
- 1972–1974: Cleveland Cavaliers
- 1974–1976: Portland Trail Blazers

Career highlights
- OAC Player of the Year (1965)

Career NBA statistics
- Points: 5,312 (6.7 ppg)
- Rebounds: 2,532 (3.2 rpg)
- Assists: 905 (1.1 apg)
- Stats at NBA.com
- Stats at Basketball Reference

John Barry Clemens (May 1, 1943 – October 26, 2026) was an American professional basketball player. The 6 ft 6 in (1.98 m) Clemens attended Xenia High School and Ohio Wesleyan University before being drafted by the NBA's New York Knicks in the 1965 NBA draft, and he went on to have an 11-year career with five teams: the Knicks, the Chicago Bulls, the Seattle SuperSonics, the Cleveland Cavaliers, and the Portland Trail Blazers. He retired in 1976 with career totals of 5,312 points and 2,532 rebounds.

== Biography ==
Clemens made it to the 1973 championship game of ABC television's one-on-one NBA basketball tournament, where he was defeated by Portland All-Star guard Geoff Petrie at Madison Square Garden on May 6, 1973.

In 2009, Clemens was inducted into the Ohio Basketball Hall of Fame.

Clemens died on October 26, 2026. He was 83.

== Career statistics ==
Legend
| GP | Games played | GS | Games started | MPG | Minutes per game |
| FG% | Field goal percentage | 3P% | 3-point field goal percentage | FT% | Free throw percentage |
| RPG | Rebounds per game | APG | Assists per game | SPG | Steals per game |
| BPG | Blocks per game | PPG | Points per game | **Bold** | Career high |

=== NBA ===
==== Regular season ====
| Year | Team | GP | GS | MPG | FG% | FT% | RPG | APG | SPG | BPG | PPG |
|---|---|---|---|---|---|---|---|---|---|---|---|
| 1965–66 | New York | 70 | 3 | 12.5 | .412 | .692 | 2.6 | 1.0 | | | 5.4 |
| 1966–67 | Chicago | 60 | | 16.4 | .419 | .756 | 3.4 | .7 | | | 7.3 |
| 1967–68 | Chicago | 78 | | **20.9** | .449 | .724 | **4.8** | 1.3 | | | **9.3** |
| 1968–69 | Chicago | 75 | | 19.3 | .374 | .656 | 4.2 | **1.7** | | | 7.4 |
| 1969–70 | Seattle | 78 | | 19.1 | .454 | .793 | 4.1 | 1.5 | | | 8.3 |
| 1970–71 | Seattle | 78 | | 16.5 | .470 | .728 | 3.1 | 1.2 | | | 7.4 |
| 1971–72 | Seattle | **82** | | 17.6 | **.521** | .844 | 3.5 | .8 | | | 7.1 |
| 1972–73 | Cleveland | 72 | | 15.5 | .516 | .779 | 2.9 | 1.6 | | | 6.5 |
| 1973–74 | Cleveland | 71 | | 12.9 | .471 | .849 | 2.3 | 1.1 | .5 | .0 | 5.5 |
| 1974–75 | Portland | 77 | | 12.4 | .473 | .750 | 2.1 | 1.0 | **.9** | .0 | 4.9 |
| 1975–76 | Portland | 49 | | 9.0 | .490 | **.886** | 1.4 | .7 | .6 | **.1** | 3.5 |
| Career | | 790 | 3 | 15.9 | .454 | .756 | 3.2 | 1.1 | .7 | .1 | 6.7 |

==== Playoffs ====
| Year | Team | GP | MPG | FG% | FT% | RPG | APG | PPG |
|---|---|---|---|---|---|---|---|---|
| 1967 | Chicago | 3 | 6.7 | .000 | .857 | **1.0** | .7 | 2.0 |
| 1968 | Chicago | **4** | **11.3** | **.500** | **1.000** | .5 | **1.3** | **5.0** |
| Career | | 7 | 9.3 | .400 | .909 | .7 | 1.0 | 3.7 |
