= Richie Guerin =

American basketball player and coach (born 1932)

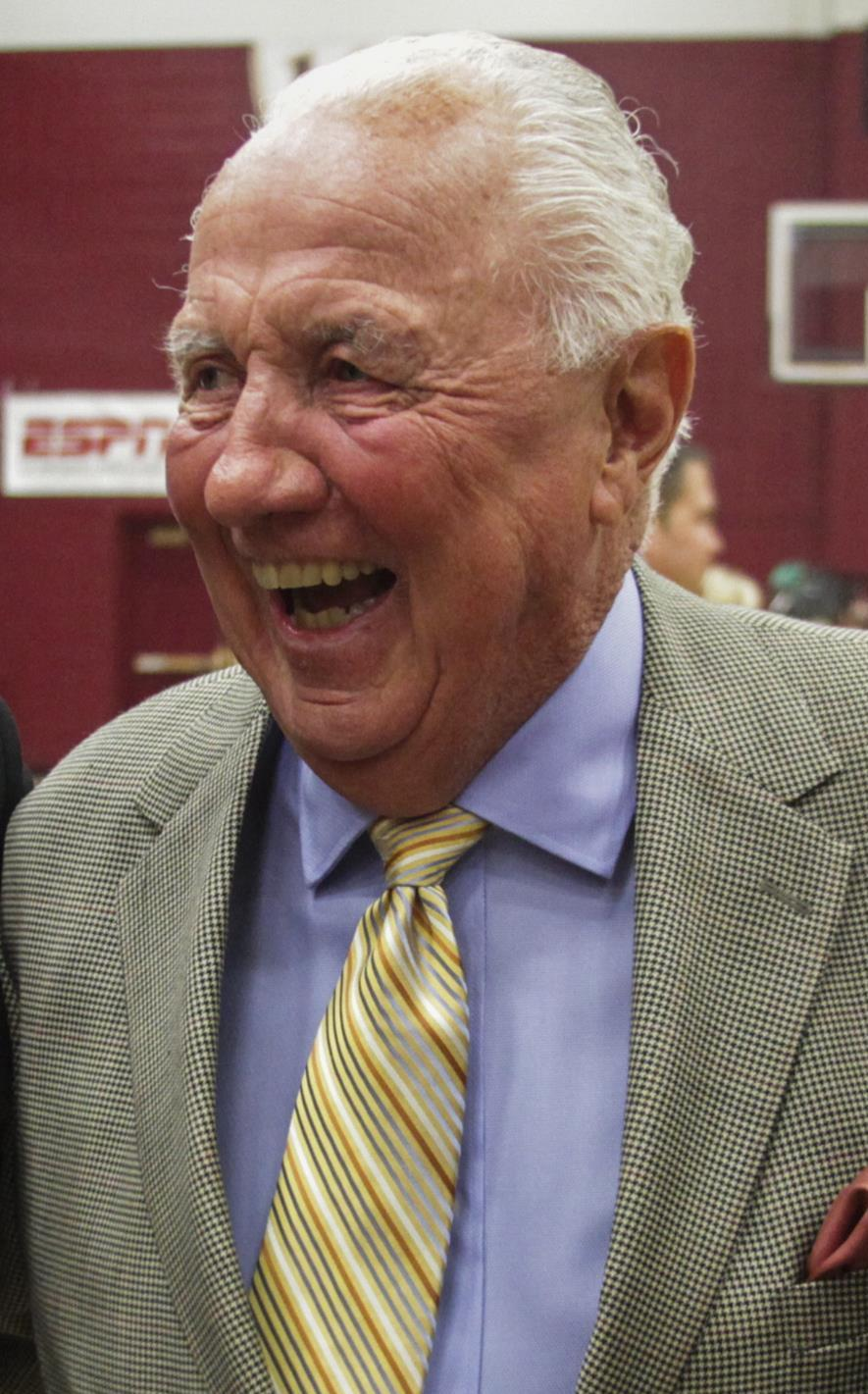
- Guerin in 2014

Personal information
- Born: May 29, 1932 (age 94) Bronx, New York, U.S.
- Listed height: 6 ft 4 in (1.93 m)
- Listed weight: 195 lb (88 kg)

Career information
- High school: Mount Saint Michael Academy (Bronx, New York)
- College: Iona (1951–1954)
- NBA draft: 1954: 2nd round, 17th overall pick
- Drafted by: New York Knicks
- Playing career: 1956–1970
- Position: Guard
- Number: 9, 15, 18, 19

Career history

Playing
- 1956–1963: New York Knicks
- 1963–1967 1968–1970: St. Louis / Atlanta Hawks

Career highlights
- As player: 6× NBA All-Star (1958–1963); 3× All-NBA Second Team (1959, 1960, 1962); As coach: NBA Coach of the Year (1968); 2x NBA All-Star Game head coach (1969, 1970)

Career statistics
- Points: 14,676 (17.3 ppg)
- Rebounds: 4,278 (5.0 rpg)
- Assists: 4,211 (5.0 apg)
- Stats at NBA.com
- Stats at Basketball Reference
- Basketball Hall of Fame

Richard Vincent Guerin (born May 29, 1932) is an American former professional basketball player and coach. He played with the National Basketball Association's (NBA) New York Knicks from 1956 to 1963 and was a player-coach of the St. Louis/Atlanta Hawks franchise where he spent nine years. On February 15, 2013, the Naismith Memorial Basketball Hall of Fame announced that Guerin had been elected as one of its 2013 inductees.

Guerin served in the Marine Corps Reserve from 1947 to 1954. While a reservist, Guerin attended Iona College from 1950 to 1954 where he scored 1,375 points in 67 games playing for coach Jim McDermott. After graduation, Guerin served on active duty at Marine Corps Schools, Quantico, Virginia for two years.

The Knicks drafted Guerin with the 8th pick in the second round of the 1954 NBA draft while still on active duty. After leaving the Marine Corps, Guerin would begin his professional basketball career in 1956.

Richie Guerin was a high-scoring point guard in the late 1950s and early 1960s. As a member of the New York Knicks, his feisty on-court style and wisecracking off-court demeanor catered to Madison Square Garden crowds.

Guerin was a gifted scorer, passer, playmaker, and was one of the most successful rebounding and driving guards of his era. He led the Knicks in assists for five consecutive seasons and in scoring three times during his seven full seasons in the Big Apple, and he tallied more than 20 points per game in four consecutive years. Guerin also set Knicks single-game records for scoring, with 57 points in 1959, and assists, with 21 in 1958. His 57-point game stood as a Knicks record until Bernard King scored 60 on Christmas Day in 1984.

A fan and media favorite, Guerin played in six consecutive NBA All-Star Games. As a team, New York struggled, reaching the playoffs only once during Guerin's tenure. He was traded to the St. Louis Hawks midway through the 1963–64 season and spent the next eight years as the team's player-coach and then head coach. With St. Louis (and eventually Atlanta), Guerin played alongside Bob Pettit, Lou Hudson, Lenny Wilkens, and Cliff Hagan. Guerin helped the Hawks to nine consecutive playoff appearances and was named NBA Coach of the Year for 1967–68.

== Early life ==
Richard Vincent Guerin was born on May 29, 1932, in the Bronx, New York, where he grew up. He attended Mount Saint Michael Academy, where he excelled in basketball.

== College career ==
Guerin attended Iona College in 1950 where he played center for coach Jim McDermott. He commuted to school daily. He averaged at least 19.9 points per game in his three years of varsity basketball, and set the freshman team scoring record at the time.

== Professional career ==
=== New York Knicks (1956–1963) ===
On April 24, 1954, the New York Knicks selected him in the 1954 NBA draft, but Guerin could not join the Knicks until he had completed two years of service in the Marines. He was drafted in the second round, the seventeenth overall pick.

New York was struggling through the mid-1950s at or near the bottom of the Eastern Division. Among the only successful players during that period were high-scoring guard Carl Braun, point guard Dick McGuire, and center Harry Gallatin. Turnover on the team was high.

Guerin joined the club in 1956 and quickly established himself. In his second season he made the NBA All-Star Team for the first of six straight years. In his third year Guerin led the Knicks in assists (5.1 apg) and ranked second in scoring (18.2 ppg). He made a (then) team-record 21 assists against St. Louis on December 12, 1958. The 21 assists he totaled were also Madison Square Garden high until John Stockton broke the record 41 years later. That year New York made its only postseason appearance with Guerin on the team, losing to the Syracuse Nationals in a first-round sweep.

By Guerin's fourth year in the league he had established himself as a scorer. He made both long shots and layups on his way to a team-leading 21.8 points per game in 1959–60. His 57 points against Syracuse on December 11 broke Braun's previous team record of 47.

In 1960–61, Guerin again averaged 21.8 points, adding 7.9 rebounds and 6.4 assists per contest. He then had his best season in 1961–62, averaging 29.5 points and a career-high 6.9 assists in 42.9 minutes per game. Guerin ranked sixth in the league in scoring and fourth in assists, and he became the first Knicks player ever to score 2,000 points in a season (2,303). He ended that season as one of eight NBA players to ever have 2000+ points, 500+ rebounds and 500+ assists in a season. By the end of the campaign Guerin had firmly established himself among the league's backcourt elite. He was named to the All-NBA Second Team for the third time in his first six seasons.

In the 1962–63, Guerin averaged a team-leading 21.5 points. He ranked seventh in the league in scoring, eighth in assists (4.4 apg), and second in free-throw percentage (.848).

When he left the Knicks, Guerin ranked second on the team's all-time scoring list behind Carl Braun.

=== St. Louis / Atlanta Hawks (1963–1967, 1968–1970) ===
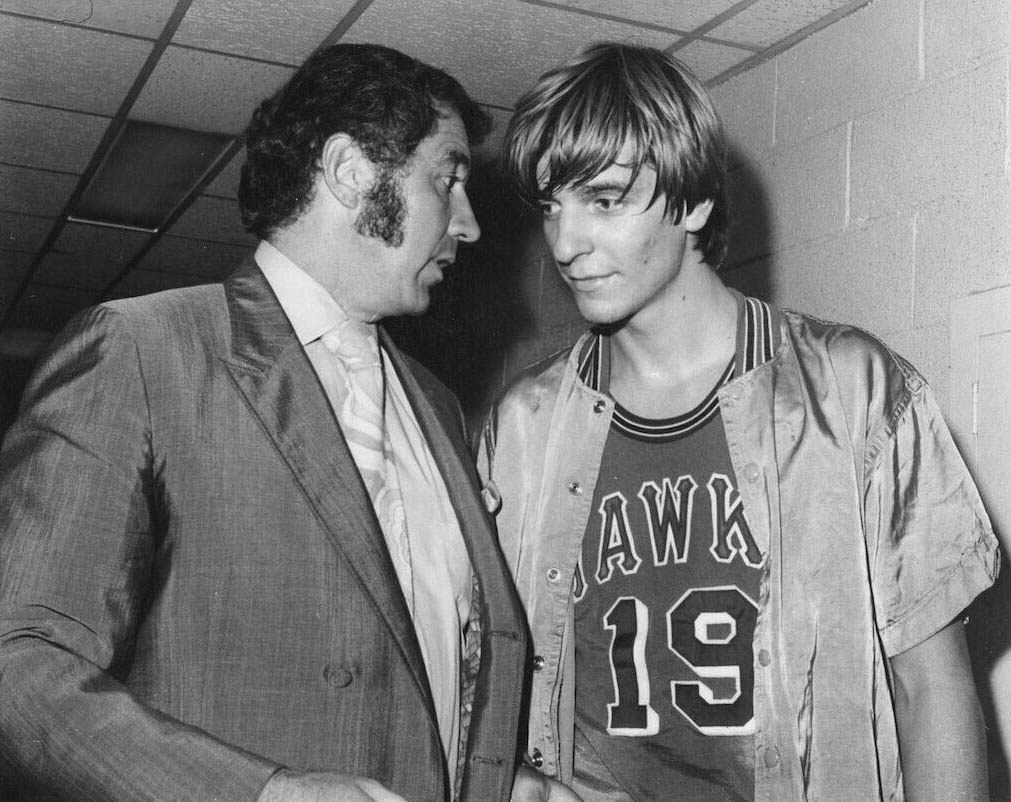
Guerin and star Pistol Pete Maravich in 1970

On October 18, 1963, two games into the 1963–64 season, the Knicks traded Guerin to the St. Louis Hawks for cash and a second-round draft pick (Howard Komives was later selected). In his first appearance at the Garden in a Hawks uniform, Knicks fans showed their gratitude by giving Guerin a five-minute standing ovation.

Guerin joined a Hawks team loaded with offensive weapons, and his production dropped accordingly to 13.1 points per game in 1963–64. He became the Hawks' player-coach on December 28, 1964, replacing Harry Gallatin who was fired despite the Hawks being in second place in the NBA Western Division. At the time, he was one of two player-coaches in the NBA, with the Detroit Pistons' Dave DeBusschere being the other. St. Louis had gone 17–16 under Gallatin, and the team went 28–19 under Guerin. The Hawks earned a playoff spot but lost to the Baltimore Bullets in a division semifinal series. Under Guerin's direction, the Hawks reached the playoffs in each of the next seven seasons.

Guerin played two more full seasons, averaging 14.9 points in 1965–66 and 13.8 in 1966–67. After the Seattle expansion team drafted him in 1967, he announced his retirement as a player. As a coach, he guided the Hawks to a 56–26 record and the Western Division championship and being named NBA Coach of the Year for 1967–1968.

On May 1, 1967, Guerin was drafted by the Seattle SuperSonics from the St. Louis Hawks in the NBA expansion draft.

On November 15, 1968, Guerin was traded by the Seattle SuperSonics to the Atlanta Hawks for Dick Smith.

The Hawks moved to Atlanta prior to the 1968–69 season, and Seattle traded Guerin back, allowing him to return to playing as a reserve player, guiding the Hawks to a 48–34 record while appearing as a player in 27 games. In the 1969–70 season, he guided them to another 48–34 record while appearing as a player in 8 games.

The fourth game of the 1970 Western Division Finals against the Los Angeles Lakers on April 19, 1970, was Guerin's last game as a player. He contributed 31 points, 5 rebounds, and 3 assists, but his team failed to avoid a four-game sweep.

== Legacy and honors ==
In 2013, Guerin was inducted into the Naismith Hall of Fame. Guerin was inducted into the New York City Basketball Hall of Fame in 1992. In 2022, he was a member of the inaugural class of the Bronx Basketball Hall of Fame.

Guerin is considered the last NBA player to use a two-handed set shot.

== Coaching career ==
=== St. Louis / Atlanta Hawks (1964–1972) ===
Guerin stayed on as head coach for two more seasons, and Atlanta went 36–46 each year. He compiled a 327–291 career coaching record. Notably, Guerin was Pete Maravich's first pro head coach during those two seasons, and had been responsible for drafting Maravich (third overall) in the 1970 draft (after Maravich had been National College Player of the Year). Guerin thought Maravich, who still holds the all-time NCAA scoring record, was as skilled as anyone who ever played.

Guerin was promoted to general manager on April 24, 1972. His successor as head coach was Cotton Fitzsimmons who was appointed just over five weeks later on May 31. Guerin was fired on August 4, 1973, despite having four years remaining on a five‐year contract. Feeling the need for a promoter as general manager, the Hawks replaced Guerin with Pat Williams two days later on August 6.

== NBA career statistics ==
Legend
GP	Games played	GS	Games started	MPG	Minutes per game
FG%	Field goal percentage	3P%	3-point field goal percentage	FT%	Free throw percentage
RPG	Rebounds per game	APG	Assists per game	SPG	Steals per game
BPG	Blocks per game	PPG	Points per game	**Bold**	Career high

=== Regular season ===
Year	Team	GP	MPG	FG%	FT%	RPG	APG	PPG
1956–57	New York	72	24.9	.368	.620	4.6	2.5	9.7
1957–58	New York	63	37.6	.354	.691	7.8	5.0	16.5
1958–59	New York	71	36.0	.424	.802	7.3	5.1	18.2
1959–60	New York	74	32.8	.420	.773	6.8	6.3	21.8
1960–61	New York	79	38.3	.396	.792	**7.9**	6.4	21.8
1961–62	New York	78	**42.9**	.442	.820	6.4	**6.9**	**29.5**
1962–63	New York	79	34.3	.432	.848	4.2	4.4	21.5
1963–64	New York	2	13.0	**.688**	.800	1.5	2.0	13.0
1963–64	St. Louis	78	30.0	.410	.819	3.2	4.8	13.1
1964–65	St. Louis	57	29.4	.446	.767	2.6	4.8	14.4
1965–66	St. Louis	**80**	29.5	.415	.812	3.9	4.9	14.9
1966–67	St. Louis	**80**	28.4	.436	.731	2.4	4.3	13.7
1968–69	Atlanta	27	17.5	.423	.770	2.2	3.7	5.6
1969–70	Atlanta	8	8.0	.273	**1.000**	0.3	1.5	0.9
Career		848	32.4	.416	.780	5.0	5.0	17.3
All-Star		6	20.3	.411	.654	3.2	3.0	10.5

=== Playoffs ===
Year	Team	GP	MPG	FG%	FT%	RPG	APG	PPG
1959	New York	2	38.5	.257	.857	**9.0**	7.5	15.0
1964	St. Louis	**12**	35.7	.444	.788	4.2	4.1	18.1
1965	St. Louis	4	31.3	.385	.760	2.0	5.3	17.3
1966	St. Louis	10	**39.9**	.453	.816	3.7	s**7.9**	**20.6**
1967	St. Louis	9	25.3	.419	.800	2.6	4.3	10.7
1969	Atlanta	3	10.7	.250	.500	1.7	2.3	1.0
1970	Atlanta	2	28.0	**.619**	**1.000**	4.0	2.0	16.5
Career		42	32.0	.429	.803	3.5	5.1	15.6

== Head coaching record ==
Legend
Regular season	G	Games coached	W	Games won	L	Games lost	W–L %	Win–loss %
Playoffs	PG	Playoff games	PW	Playoff wins	PL	Playoff losses	PW–L %	Playoff win–loss %

Team	Year	G	W	L	W–L%	Finish	PG	PW	PL	PW–L%	Result
St. Louis	1964–65	47	28	19	.596	2nd in West	4	1	3	.250	Lost in Div. Semifinals
St. Louis	1965–66	80	36	44	.450	3rd in West	10	6	4	.600	Lost in Div. Finals
St. Louis	1966–67	81	39	42	.481	2nd in West	9	5	4	.556	Lost in Div. Finals
St. Louis	1967–68	82	56	26	.683	1st in West	6	2	4	.333	Lost in Div. Semifinals
Atlanta	1968–69	82	48	34	.585	2nd in West	11	5	6	.455	Lost in Div. Finals
Atlanta	1969–70	82	48	34	.585	1st in West	9	4	5	.444	Lost in Div. Finals
Atlanta	1970–71	82	36	46	.439	2nd in West	5	1	4	.200	Lost in Div. Semifinals
Atlanta	1971–72	82	36	46	.439	2nd in West	6	2	4	.333	Lost in Div. Semifinals
Career		618	327	291	.529		60	26	34	.433	

== Marine Corps ==
Richie Guerin on the 1955-56 basketball team at Marine Corps Schools, Quantico, Virginia

Guerin enlisted in the Marine Corps Reserve and served from 1947 to 1954. While a reservist, Guerin attended Iona College from 1950 to 1954, and upon graduation was commissioned a second lieutenant. He served on active duty with the T&T Regtiment, Marine Corps Schools, Quantico, Virginia until his discharge as a first lieutenant in June 1956. He was awarded the National Defense Service Medal and the Organized Marine Corps Rerserve Medal.

Guerin was inducted into the Marine Corps Sports Hall of Fame in 2004.

== Personal ==
Following his retirement from professional basketball, Guerin became a Knicks sportscaster and a Wall Street stockbroker. Guerin retired in 2005 following a 31-year stint first as a broker, then as managing director, for Bear, Stearns & Co. Guerin, who has four children and nine grandchildren, now resides in Palm Beach, Florida with his wife, Pat.
