= 1968 NBA Finals =

1968 basketball championship series

Team	Coach	Wins
Boston Celtics	Bill Russell (player-coach)	4
Los Angeles Lakers	Butch van Breda Kolff	2
- Dates: April 21–May 2
- Hall of Famers: Celtics: Sam Jones (1984); John Havlicek (1984); Bailey Howell (1997); Don Nelson (2012, coach); Bill Russell (1975); Satch Sanders (2011, contributor); Wayne Embry (1999); Lakers: Elgin Baylor (1977); Gail Goodrich (1996); Jerry West (1980); Coaches: Bill Russell (2021); Officials: Mendy Rudolph (2007); Earl Strom (1995)
- Eastern finals: Celtics defeated 76ers, 4–3
- Western finals: Lakers defeated Warriors, 4–0

The 1968 NBA World Championship Series pitted the Boston Celtics from the East, against the Los Angeles Lakers from the West, for the sixth time in ten years. The Celtics won their tenth NBA Championship in twelve seasons, by defeating the Lakers in six games. Significantly, Game 6 marked the first time that any NBA competition had taken place during the month of May. This was the last NBA Finals without a Finals MVP named as the NBA Finals Most Valuable Player Award was introduced the following year.

== Series summary ==
Game	Date	Home team	Result	Road team
Game 1	April 21	Boston Celtics	107–101 (1–0)	Los Angeles Lakers
Game 2	April 24	Boston Celtics	113–123 (1–1)	Los Angeles Lakers
Game 3	April 26	Los Angeles Lakers	119–127 (1–2)	Boston Celtics
Game 4	April 28	Los Angeles Lakers	119–105 (2–2)	Boston Celtics
Game 5	April 30	Boston Celtics	120–117 (OT) (3–2)	Los Angeles Lakers
Game 6	May 2	Los Angeles Lakers	109–124 (2–4)	Boston Celtics

Celtics win series 4–2

== Team rosters ==
=== Boston Celtics ===
1967–68 Boston Celtics roster
Players

Pos.	No.	Player	Height	Weight	DOB	From
F/C	28	Wayne Embry	6 ft 8 in (2.03 m)	240 lb (109 kg)	1937-03-26	Miami (OH)
PG	11	Mal Graham	6 ft 1 in (1.85 m)	185 lb (84 kg)	1945-02-23	NYU
G/F	17	John Havlicek	6 ft 5 in (1.96 m)	203 lb (92 kg)	1940-04-08	Ohio State
SF	18	Bailey Howell	6 ft 7 in (2.01 m)	210 lb (95 kg)	1937-01-20	Mississippi State
PF	27	Johnny Jones	6 ft 7 in (2.01 m)	205 lb (93 kg)	1933-03-12	Cal State LA
SG	24	Sam Jones	6 ft 4 in (1.93 m)	198 lb (90 kg)	1933-06-24	North Carolina Central
F	19	Don Nelson	6 ft 6 in (1.98 m)	210 lb (95 kg)	1940-05-15	Iowa
C	6	Bill Russell	6 ft 9 in (2.06 m)	215 lb (98 kg)	1934-02-12	San Francisco
SF	16	Satch Sanders	6 ft 6 in (1.98 m)	210 lb (95 kg)	1938-11-08	NYU
G	20	Larry Siegfried	6 ft 3 in (1.91 m)	190 lb (86 kg)	1939-10-14	Ohio State
G/F	12	Tom Thacker	6 ft 2 in (1.88 m)	170 lb (77 kg)	1939-11-02	Cincinnati
PG	26	Rick Weitzman	6 ft 2 in (1.88 m)	175 lb (79 kg)	1946-04-30	Northeastern

Coaches
Head coach
- Bill Russell

Legend
- (DP) Unsigned draft pick
- (FA) Free agent
- (S) Suspended
- Injured

=== Los Angeles Lakers ===
1967–68 Los Angeles Lakers roster
Players

Pos.	No.	Player	Height	Weight	DOB	From
SG	30	Cliff Anderson	6 ft 2 in (1.88 m)	200 lb (91 kg)	1944-09-07	Saint Joseph's
PF	23	Jim Barnes	6 ft 8 in (2.03 m)	210 lb (95 kg)	1941-04-13	UTEP
SF	22	Elgin Baylor	6 ft 5 in (1.96 m)	225 lb (102 kg)	1934-09-16	Seattle
SG	21	Archie Clark	6 ft 2 in (1.88 m)	175 lb (79 kg)	1941-07-15	Minnesota
C	31	Mel Counts	7 ft 0 in (2.13 m)	230 lb (104 kg)	1941-10-16	Oregon State
SG	12	Freddie Crawford	6 ft 4 in (1.93 m)	189 lb (86 kg)	1941-12-33	St. Bonaventure
SG	11	Gail Goodrich	6 ft 1 in (1.85 m)	170 lb (77 kg)	1943-04-23	UCLA
PF	52	Dennis Hamilton	6 ft 8 in (2.03 m)	210 lb (95 kg)	1944-05-08	Notre Dame
SF	33	Tom Hawkins	6 ft 5 in (1.96 m)	210 lb (95 kg)	1936-12-22	Notre Dame
C	14	Darrall Imhoff	6 ft 10 in (2.08 m)	220 lb (100 kg)	1938-10-11	California
C	34	Erwin Mueller	6 ft 8 in (2.03 m)	230 lb (104 kg)	1944-03-12	San Francisco
PG	44	Jerry West	6 ft 3 in (1.91 m)	175 lb (79 kg)	1938-05-28	West Virginia
SF	24	John Wetzel	6 ft 5 in (1.96 m)	190 lb (86 kg)	1944-10-22	Virginia Tech

Coaches
Head coach
- Butch van Breda Kolff

Legend
- (DP) Unsigned draft pick
- (FA) Free agent
- (S) Suspended
- Injured

== Game summaries ==
April 21

Boxscore

Los Angeles Lakers 101, Boston Celtics 107
Scoring by quarter: 28–29, 33–19, 24–33, 16–26
Pts: Jerry West 25; Rebs: Darrall Imhoff 14; Asts: Archie Clark 5	Pts: Bailey Howell 20; Rebs: Bill Russell 25; Asts: John Havlicek 8
Boston leads series, 1–0

Boston Garden, Boston, Massachusetts
Attendance: 9,546

April 24

Boxscore

Los Angeles Lakers 123, Boston Celtics 113
Scoring by quarter: 28–27, 26–27, 36–27, 33–32
Pts: Jerry West 35; Rebs: Darrall Imhoff 11; Asts: Erwin Mueller 7	Pts: John Havlicek 24; Rebs: Bill Russell 24; Asts: Bill Russell 5
Series tied, 1–1

Boston Garden, Boston, Massachusetts
Attendance: 14,780

April 26

Boxscore

Boston Celtics 127, Los Angeles Lakers 119
Scoring by quarter: 36–28, 33–34, 34–25, 24–32
Pts: John Havlicek 27; Rebs: Bill Russell 16; Asts: Bill Russell 9	Pts: Jerry West 33; Rebs: Elgin Baylor 18; Asts: Jerry West 9
Boston leads series, 2–1

The Forum, Inglewood, California
Attendance: 17,011

April 28

Boxscore

Boston Celtics 105, Los Angeles Lakers 118
Scoring by quarter: 21–26, 23–26, 31–28, 30–38
Pts: Bailey Howell 24; Rebs: Bill Russell 22; Asts: John Havlicek 8	Pts: Jerry West 38; Rebs: Darrall Imhoff 20; Asts: Darrall Imhoff 6
Series tied, 2–2

The Forum, Inglewood, California
Attendance: 17,147

April 30

Boxscore

Los Angeles Lakers 117, Boston Celtics 120 (OT)
Scoring by quarter: 20–34, 34–22, 18–30, 36–22, Overtime: 9–12
Pts: Jerry West 35; Rebs: Elgin Baylor 15; Asts: Baylor, West 6 each	Pts: John Havlicek 31; Rebs: Bill Russell 25; Asts: John Havlicek 8
Boston leads series, 3–2

Boston Garden, Boston, Massachusetts
Attendance: 14,780

May 2

Boxscore

Boston Celtics 124, Los Angeles Lakers 109
Scoring by quarter: 35–28, 35–22, 24–28, 30–31
Pts: John Havlicek 40; Rebs: Bill Russell 19; Asts: John Havlicek 7	Pts: Elgin Baylor 28; Rebs: Mel Counts 25; Asts: Elgin Baylor 6
Boston wins series, 4–2

The Forum, Inglewood, California
Attendance: 17,392

== See also ==
- 1968 NBA playoffs
- 1967–68 NBA season
