= Don Ohl =

American basketball player (1936–2024)

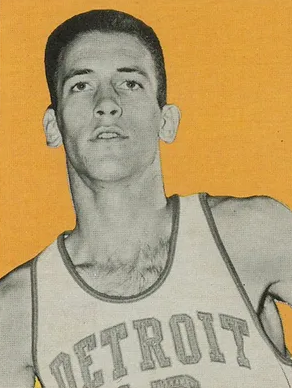
- Ohl with the Detroit Pistons c. 1961

Personal information
- Born: April 18, 1936 Murphysboro, Illinois, U.S.
- Died: December 2, 2024 (aged 88) St. Louis, Missouri, U.S.
- Listed height: 6 ft 3 in (1.91 m)
- Listed weight: 190 lb (86 kg)

Career information
- High school: Edwardsville (Edwardsville, Illinois)
- College: Illinois (1955–1958)
- NBA draft: 1958: 5th round, 36th overall pick
- Drafted by: Philadelphia Warriors
- Playing career: 1959–1970
- Position: Shooting guard / point guard
- Number: 10, 30

Career history
- 1959–1960: Peoria Cats
- 1960–1964: Detroit Pistons
- 1964–1968: Baltimore Bullets
- 1968–1970: St. Louis / Atlanta Hawks

Career highlights
- 5× NBA All-Star (1963–1967)

Career NBA statistics
- Points: 11,549 (15.9 ppg)
- Rebounds: 2,163 (3.0 rpg)
- Assists: 2,243 (3.1 apg)
- Stats at NBA.com
- Stats at Basketball Reference

Donald Jay Ohl (April 18, 1936 – December 2, 2024) was an American professional basketball player for ten seasons (1960–1970) in the National Basketball Association (NBA). He played college basketball for the Illinois Fighting Illini. The guard took part in five consecutive NBA All-Star Games (1963–1967).

== Early life ==
Ohl was born on April 18, 1936, in Murphysboro, a rural town in southern Illinois, to Elmer R. and Blanche E. (Brendel) Ohl. After living in Peoria, Illinois and Iowa, they moved to Edwardsville, Illinois when he was ten years old.

Ohl attended Edwardsville High School, where he played basketball, baseball and golf; and excelled academically. As a basketball player, Ohl averaged 19.6 points per game in his senior year, 1953–1954, and his team finished fourth in the Illinois state basketball tournament. He made All-Southwestern Conference as a junior and senior, and was both first-team All-District and first-team All-State as a senior. As a senior he was named to the state championship tournament's all-tournament team. He received Edwardsville's Warnock Trophy for the senior athlete with the highest scholastic average. He was named the Prep Player of the Year by the St. Louis radio station KXOK.

He graduated in the top ten percent of his class academically. The Brooklyn Dodgers offered him a contract to join their minor league baseball system after graduating high school.

== College career ==
Ohl chose to attend the University of Illinois on a four-year basketball scholarship. He chose Illinois over Saint Louis University, Oklahoma A&M (now Oklahoma State) and Vanderbilt, which also had extended scholarship offers. He averaged 6.7 points per game as a sophomore. The Illini ended the season 18–4, ranked 10th in the nation by the Associated Press (AP). As a junior, he averaged 15.6 points per game, and a team-high 19.6 as a senior in 1957-58.

He was chosen the Illini's most valuable player as a senior. Ohl was also selected as a third-team Helms Foundation NCAA All-American and a second-team Converse All-American. He was selected AP first-team All-Big Ten as a junior and senior. United Press International (UPI) also named him All-Big Ten as a senior. He graduated as the No. 3 scorer in school history with 1,230 points.

He also played baseball at Illinois for four years as a second baseman on the school's baseball team.

== AAU basketball and Olympic trials ==
In his final college season, Ohl began to pique the interest of several NBA teams in advance of the 1958 draft. The Philadelphia Warriors selected him in the fifth round (37th overall), but he was unsure about his readiness for the next level. Ohl accepted a position with the Peoria Caterpillar Tractor Company in Morton, Illinois, where he worked while playing one or two seasons for the Peoria Cats in the National Industrial Basketball League (NIBL). In March 1960, Peoria defeated Akron, 115–99, for the Amateur Athletic Union (AAU) title. Ohl scored 28 points with teammate, and future NBA player, Bob Boozer scoring 30. Ohl never signed with the Warriors.

As Ohl told The Edwardsville (Ill.) Intelligencer in a 2008 interview, "'It may have been a mistake, but I didn't end up playing in the NBA until two years after I got drafted. I didn't think I was good enough for the NBA even though people who should have known kept telling me that I was. I started working for Caterpillar and they had a team in the Industrial League, which might be comparable to a farm club of the NBA'". He played two years in the NIBL.

"'In 1960, we won an AAU tournament in Denver, and the next week they had the Olympic Trials to see who would represent the U.S. in the Olympics. We played the final game against the college all-stars, who had a bunch of All-Americans like (future NBA stars) Oscar Robertson, Jerry West, Walt Bellamy and Jerry Lucas, and of course, they beat us.'" Boozer made the Olympic team, and Ohl was named an alternate. Terry Dischinger was one of the NCAA players chosen for the Olympic team, and would be involved in a trade for Ohl a few years later.

== Professional career ==
=== Detroit Pistons ===
Ohl performed well enough at the Olympic trials to put himself back on the NBA radar. He was scouted by Detroit Pistons coach Dick McGuire, who acquired his rights from the Warriors. The Pistons made an offer that Ohl could not turn down. In his rookie year (1960-61) he went from bench player to starter. He played in 79 games, averaging 27.5 minutes, 13.3 points, 3.4 assists and 3.2 rebounds per game.

In 1961-62, he averaged 17.2 points, 3.2 assists and 3.5 rebounds per game. He was seventh among all NBA guards in field goal percentage (.444), and third among shooting guards, behind only future Hall of Fame guards Sam Jones (.464) and Hal Greer (.447). The Pistons defeated the Cincinnati Royals in the first round of the Western Division playoffs. Ohl led the Pistons with 24 points per game. The Pistons lost the Western Division finals to the Los Angeles Lakers in six games, with Ohl averaging 17 points per game.

By his third year (1962-63) with the Pistons he was an all-star, averaging 19.3 points a game. The Pistons lost in the first round of the playoffs to the St. Louis Hawks, Ohl again leading the team in scoring (21.3 points per game) as well as assists (4.8 per game). The following season (1963-64) he averaged 17.3 points, 3.2 assists and 2.5 rebounds per game. Charlie Wolf, who was a strict and demanding coach, replaced McGuire as head coach that season. Some Pistons players rebelled at his coaching style and openly criticized Wolf, with Ohl and teammate Bob Ferry the most upset with Wolf. Also during the season, Wolf stripped future Hall of Fame forward Bailey Howell of his captaincy. Wolf was replaced after 11 games the following season by 24-year old future Hall of Fame forward Dave Debusschere, as the Pistons' player-coach.

=== Piston-Bullets Trade ===
==== 'Brinks Robbery in Baltimore' ====
Shortly after the 1963–64 season ended, Ohl was involved in one of the first so-called megatrades, this one an eight-player blockbuster between the Pistons and the Baltimore Bullets. On June 9, 1964, the Pistons sent Ohl, center Bob Ferry, Howell, forward Les Hunter and the draft rights to guard Wally (later Wali) Jones to the Bullets in exchange for forwards Terry Dischinger (the 1963 NBA Rookie of the Year and a two time All-Star) and Don Kojis, and guard Rod Thorn. After an August 2, 2005 megatrade involving five NBA teams and 13 players, the Associated Press set out a chronological list of the NBA's historically biggest trades. The 1964 Detroit-Baltimore trade was listed first among eleven trades identified between 1964 and 2005.

The trade provided the Bullets with two all-star starters. Howell started two seasons in Baltimore, averaging 19.2 and 17.5 points per game, respectively, and was named an All-Star (1965-66); and Ohl was a starter and three-time All-Star with the Bullets (1964 to 1967). Howell was traded to the Boston Celtics for center Mel Counts before the 1966-67 season, and Counts was included in a trade in January 1967 that brought forward Ray Scott to the Bullets, where he played from 1967 to 1970.

Dischinger was an All-Star in his first year in Detroit, but then missed the next two seasons while in military service, and never regained his All-Star form. The Pistons traded Thorn early in his second season with them, and traded Kojis after two years, after he averaged only 13 minutes per game over those two seasons (though he went on to play nine more NBA seasons, in two of which he was an All-Star).

"They called it the Brinks robbery out in Baltimore because it was so one-sided to Baltimore," Ohl told the Edwardsville (Ill.) Intelligencer. "Dickey McGuire was my coach my first two years [in Detroit] and I just admired him to death. He quit and Charlie Wolf took over, and for me it was not a good situation and apparently for two or three other players, because they went with me. I was happy to get out. I liked Detroit, but I was ready to go."

=== Baltimore Bullets (1964-65) ===
In the 1964–65 season, Ohl started for the Bullets in the backcourt with Kevin Loughery, and a front line consisting of three future Hall of Fame players; forwards Bailey Howell and Gus Johson, and center Walt Bellamy. Ohl averaged 18.4 points, 4.4 rebounds and 3.2 assists per game, and was named an All-Star along with Bellamy and Johnson.

The Bullets reached the playoffs for the first time in the franchise's four year history, and achieved the first playoff series victory in franchise history, a four-game upset of the St. Louis Hawks in the 1965 Western Division semifinals. Ohl's 22 points per game led the Bullets in that series. He also averaged 7.5 rebounds and 2.8 assists per game in the series. They lost the Western Division finals to the Los Angeles Lakers in six games. Ohl led the Bullets in scoring with a 28.8 points per game average, and averaged 5.7 rebounds and 2.7 assists per game. The only player in the series who averaged more was future Hall of Fame guard Jerry West (46.3 points per game).

==== Wild West Shootout ====
Ohl experienced his finest hour in the 1965 playoffs, in which he averaged 26.1 points in 10 games. His 26.1 playoff average was behind only Hall of Fame players West, Wilt Chamberlain, Sam Jones and Oscar Robertson that season. In the Western Division finals that year, each game in the series was decided by eights points or less. Ohl and West were involved in one of the more memorable series shootouts in league postseason history.

Years later Ohl recalled, Future Hall of Fame forward "(Elgin) Baylor wasn't playing -- he was hurt". "It was the third game. It was in Baltimore. We played, we won and in the locker room I said, 'How many did West get?' and they said, '51 (points).' I said, '51, you got to be kidding me.' I think I had 35 or 38, I don't remember. I said, 'I guarantee you one thing you can print is he won't get 51 tomorrow night.'" "We go play the next game, we win and I said, 'How many did West get?' They said, '53.' I said, 'You got to be kidding me.' (Fred) Schaus, the coach, just put him on the side of the floor, gave him the ball and let him work it in until he got a shot, because like I said, Baylor wasn't playing. Great player, good friend. I enjoy him".

As the games were actually played, Baylor played only five minutes of Game 1, when he injured his left knee and could not return. He missed the remaining five games in the series. West had 49 points in Game 1, and 52 points in Game 2; both Lakers wins. Ohl had 29 in Game 1 and 30 in Game 2. The Bullets won Game 3 with Howell scoring 29, Ohl 24 and West 44. The Bullets tied the series with a two-point win in Game 4, West scoring 48 and Ohl scoring 28. The Lakers won the next two games, with West scoring 43 and 42, and Ohl scoring 28 and 34. In Game 6, Ohl was driving down the court for a layup when West came from behind Ohl and stole the ball. Had Ohl scored, the Lakers' lead would have been reduced to four; but the Lakers scored off West's steal to go up by eight points. Schaus considered it the most important play of the game.

=== Baltimore Bullets (1965-1968) ===
In the 1965-66 season, Ohl led the Bullets in scoring with a 20.6 points per game average (11th in the NBA). He was in the top 10 among guards in field goal percentage (.445). He was again named an All-Star, for the fourth consecutive year. He scored 16 points in the 1966 All-Star Game. The Bullets were swept 3–0 in the first round of the 1966 playoffs by the St. Louis Hawks. However, Ohl averaged 26.7 points, 4.7 rebounds and 2.7 assists in that series.

His 1966-67 season ended in early February 1967 because of ligament damage in his right knee, for which he underwent surgery at Kernan Hospital in Baltimore. He was averaging 20.3 points per game over 58 games before his season ended. He was again among the top 10 guards in field goal percentage (.451), and was again 11th in the NBA in points per game (just behind teammate Johnson). He was selected to play in the All-Star Game for the fifth consecutive season, and scored 17 points in the January 10, 1967 game. After that season, he never averaged more than 14 points a game in his final three seasons.

In 1967-68, Ohl played in 39 games for the Bullets before he was traded to the St. Louis Hawks in January 1968. He was averaging 14.8 points per game at the time, his lowest scoring average since his rookie season; but had just scored 32 and 21 points in his most recent games before the trade. The Bullets had drafted future Hall of Fame rookie shooting guard Earl Monroe that year, who would rank fifth in scoring in the NBA that season, and become Rookie of the Year; starting alongside Loughery. Ohl, nearing 32, was the oldest player on a team with a number of other guards, all younger, and was seen as expendable.

=== St. Louis/Atlanta Hawks ===
In 1968, Ohl was traded to the Hawks for Tom Workman and a second or third round draft choice. The Hawks were in first place at the time, and Hawks' coach Richie Guerin saw the experienced Ohl as insurance for the team's stretch drive. The Hawks ended the season 56–26, first in the Western Division. Ohl finished the 1967-68 season averaging 13.1 points in 26.5 minutes per game for the Hawks. In a five-game stretch from March 3 to 9, he had games with 27, 28, 21, eight and 29 points. The Hawks lost to the San Francisco Warriors 4–2 in the first round of the playoffs. Ohl averaged 11.5 points and 23.8 minutes per game in the series. The favored Hawks were upset in the series' first game, 111–106. Ohl had rallied the Hawks late in the game, and led the team with 26 points, but it was not enough to win the game.

The following season, he averaged 12.1 points in 26.3 minutes per game. The Hawks defeated the San Diego Rockets in the first round of the 1968-69 NBA playoffs, with Ohl averaging 6.3 points and 1.5 rebounds over six games. He lost with a third different team to the Los Angeles Lakers and Jerry West in the 1968-69 Western Division finals; averaging seven points in 17 minutes per game over five games.

In his final season (1969-70), he averaged 6.2 points in 15 minutes per game. He was taken in the 1970 NBA expansion draft by the Cleveland Cavaliers but opted to retire at 34 years of age. Upon learning of his selection, he considered retirement almost immediately in favor of working at his office equipment business; and with thoughts about potentially pursuing coaching or media work. At that point in his career he was also having problems with his knees, and realized he could no longer play as well as he would have liked.

== Legacy and honors ==
Ohl played 10 seasons for the Pistons, Bullets, and Hawks. He was the Bullets team Most Valuable Player in 1965 and 1966. The crafty 6 ft 3 in (1.91 m), 190 lb (86 kg) guard scored 11,549 points, averaging 15.9 points per game for his career. He averaged 16.9 points in 47 playoff games. Ohl was known for his outside shooting prowess, as one of the NBA's best shooters during his career. He had a .434 lifetime field goal percentage, and played his entire career before the advent of the three-point shot in the NBA.

Ohl made five consecutive NBA All-Star Teams from 1962–1963 to 1966–1967. Ohl twice scored a career high of 43 points in a single game, first on January 23, 1963, in a 123–119 defeat against the Los Angeles Lakers. He outscored both Elgin Baylor (42) and Jerry West (36) in that game. He scored 43 again as a Baltimore Bullet on December 25, 1966, in a 129–127 loss to his former team, the Pistons. Ohl has the highest playoff scoring average in the Washington Wizards franchise history, at 26.23.

Ohl was inducted into the Illinois Basketball Coaches Association Hall of Fame in 1973, the Edwardsville High School Athletic Hall of Fame in 1981 and the St. Louis Sports Hall of Fame in 2017.

Ohl became a rewards card in the NBA 2K21.

As a player, Ohl went by the nickname of Waxie because of his trademark crew cut.

== Personal life and death ==
Ohl owned an office supply store in St. Louis during his playing career, and was pleased to be traded to the St. Louis Hawks in early 1968. That convenience was short-lived as the team moved to Atlanta the following season.

Ohl died in St. Louis on December 2, 2024, at the age of 88. He was survived by three children, seven grandchildren and six great-grandchildren, his wife Judith Kay (Webber) Ohl having died in 2011. They were married in Peoria in 1960.

== Career statistics ==
Legend
GP	Games played	GS	Games started	MPG	Minutes per game
FG%	Field goal percentage	3P%	3-point field goal percentage	FT%	Free throw percentage
RPG	Rebounds per game	APG	Assists per game	SPG	Steals per game
BPG	Blocks per game	PPG	Points per game	**Bold**	Career high
*	Led the league

=== NBA ===
==== Regular season ====
Year	Team	GP	GS	MPG	FG%	FT%	RPG	APG	PPG
1960–61	Detroit	79*		27.5	.394	.719	3.2	3.4	13.3
1961–62	Detroit	77		32.8	.444	.718	3.5	3.2	17.0
1962–63	Detroit	**80***		**37.0**	.439	.724	3.0	**4.1**	19.3
1963–64	Detroit	71		33.3	.408	.680	2.5	3.2	17.3
1964–65	Baltimore	77		36.6	.438	.732	**4.4**	3.2	18.4
1965–66	Baltimore	73		36.2	.445	.735	3.8	4.0	**20.6**
1966–67	Baltimore	58		34.9	.451	.780	3.3	2.9	20.3
1967–68	Baltimore	39		28.1	.433	.770	2.9	2.2	14.8
1967–68	St. Louis	31		26.5	.454	.783	2.0	2.4	13.1
1968–69	Atlanta	76		26.3	.427	.707	2.2	2.9	12.1
1969–70	Atlanta	66		14.9	**.473**	**.806**	1.7	1.7	6.3
Career		727		30.8	.434	.732	3.0	3.1	15.9
All-Star		5	0	17.4	.372	.933	1.8	1.4	9.2

==== Playoffs ====
Year	Team	GP	MPG	FG%	FT%	RPG	APG	PPG
1961	Detroit	5	26.0	.321	.684	3.8	2.8	12.6
1962	Detroit	8	39.6	.415	.815	3.4	3.1	20.5
1963	Detroit	4	38.8	.398	**.864**	3.0	**4.8**	21.3
1965	Baltimore	10	**43.2**	.481	.782	**6.4**	2.7	26.1
1966	Baltimore	3	37.0	**.507**	.750	4.7	2.7	**26.7**
1968	St. Louis	6	23.8	.482	.682	2.0	3.5	11.5
1969	Atlanta	**11**	17.6	.349	.591	1.2	1.5	6.6
Career		47	31.5	.427	.752	3.4	2.8	16.9
