= Clyde Lee =

American basketball player (born 1944)

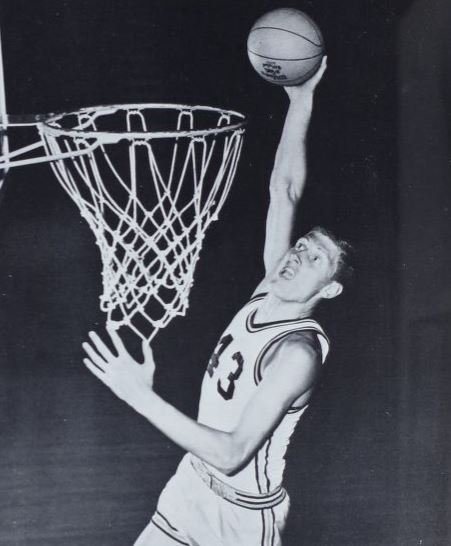
- Lee as a junior at Vanderbilt

Personal information
- Born: March 14, 1944 (age 82) Nashville, Tennessee, U.S.
- Listed height: 6 ft 10 in (2.08 m)
- Listed weight: 205 lb (93 kg)

Career information
- High school: David Lipscomb (Nashville, Tennessee)
- College: Vanderbilt (1963–1966)
- NBA draft: 1966: 1st round, 3rd overall pick
- Drafted by: San Francisco Warriors
- Playing career: 1966–1976
- Position: Power forward / center
- Number: 43, 34

Career history
- 1966–1974: San Francisco / Golden State Warriors
- 1974: Atlanta Hawks
- 1974–1976: Philadelphia 76ers

Career highlights
- NBA All-Star (1968); Consensus first-team All-American (1966); Consensus second-team All-American (1965); 2× SEC Player of the Year (1965, 1966); No. 43 retired by Vanderbilt Commodores

Career NBA statistics
- Points: 5,733 (7.7 ppg)
- Rebounds: 7,626 (10.3 rpg)
- Assists: 788 (1.1 apg)
- Stats at NBA.com
- Stats at Basketball Reference

Clyde Wayne Lee (born March 14, 1944) is an American former professional basketball player who had his most success as an All-American center at Vanderbilt University, where the two-time Southeastern Conference (SEC) Player of the Year was among the most heralded players in school history. He was a consensus second-team All American in 1965, a consensus first-team All-American in 1966, and first-team All-SEC for his three varsity seasons. He averaged 21.4 points and 15.5 rebounds per game during his career at Vanderbilt, leading the SEC in rebounding average all three years and in scoring one year. Lee holds the Vanderbilt record for career scoring average, most career rebounds, and career rebounding average per game.

Lee was the No. 3 overall pick in the 1965 NBA draft and a one-time NBA All-Star. He played ten seasons in the league, principally with the San Francisco/Golden State Warriors. Lee is one of the top rebounders in NBA history. In his ten NBA seasons, he was among the top-10 players in the league in rebounding average four times. He averaged over 10 rebounds per game for his career. Lee is ranked 14th all-time in rebounds per 36 minutes, and 45th all-time in rebounds per game in NBA history (exclusive of ABA statistics, as of 2025–26).

Lee was part of a highly unusual trade made between the Warriors and Atlanta Hawks in February 1970 that included sending Lee to the Hawks if a specific condition was met. The fulfillment of that condition did not occur until late September 1974, nearly four years and eight months later, during which time Lee played four full seasons with the Warriors. In October 1974, over the Warriors' protests, NBA commissioner J. Walter Kennedy required the Warriors to send Lee to the Hawks, completing the February 1970 trade.

== Early life ==
Lee was born on March 14, 1944, in Nashville, Tennessee. He attended high school at David Lipscomb Campus School (now Lipscomb Academy). He is considered one of the greatest high school basketball players in Nashville history.

As a sophomore in high school (1959–60), Lee was 6 ft 6 in (1.98 m) and 170 lb (77.1 kg). It was his first year playing organized basketball. At 15-years old, he was already averaging 20 rebounds per game in the team's first nine games that season. He was 6 ft 8 in (2.03 m) as a junior (1960–61), and averaged 17.1 points and 20 rebounds per game. He had a broken finger early that season, and attracted considerable defensive attention from opposing teams that year. He was named to the 1961 first-team All-City basketball team.

Lee was a 6 ft 9 in (2.06 m) center as a senior (1961–62). He was reported to be the tallest player in Nashville high school basketball history, and finished his high school basketball career among the city's top all-time scorers. In one late December 1961 game, he had 48 points and 32 rebounds. The rest of Lipscomb's team combined for only 18 points and 22 rebounds. Lee missed nine games that season with an ankle injury, but was still named the Nashville Interscholastic League's player of the year; and was again named first-team All-City. Lee averaged 26.2 points and 20 rebounds per game as a senior.

== College career ==
Lee attended Vanderbilt University, where he starred on the school's basketball team in the Southeastern Conference (SEC) under coach Roy Skinner for three seasons (1963 to 66). The lanky Lee is reported to have been a 6 ft 9 in center while at Vanderbilt, weighing only 205 lb (93 kg) as a junior. Lee was active in the Fellowship of Christian Athletes during his time at Vanderbilt. He came to be known as "Colossal Clyde" at Vanderbilt.

Known for his rebounding skills and scoring prowess around the basket, Lee made an immediate impact as a sophomore (1963–64). He led Vanderbilt in both scoring and rebounding. Lee averaged 18.8 points and an SEC leading 15.6 rebounds per game. Vanderbilt had a 19–6 record that season. Lee was named first-team All-SEC. In a January 6, 1964 85–83 win over second-ranked Kentucky, Lee had 25 rebounds and held Kentucky center Cotton Nash to 15 points; at a time when Nash averaged nearly 29 points per game. Kentucky coach Adolph Rupp said after the game, "'I'll tell you about Lee, we'd sure like to have him. He's a fine one'".

While Lee considered himself to be a rebounder first and foremost, he added a drive to the basket and mid-range jump shot to his game in his junior season and quickly blossomed into one of the elite big men in the country.

In December of Lee's junior year (1964–65), it was reported again that Adolph Rupp said of Lee, "we'd like to have Lee. He's a fine one". During his first two years at Vanderbilt, Lee was reserved and did not play aggressively, despite coach Skinner's efforts to encourage Lee to be more aggressive. In December 1964, Skinner showed Lee an opposing team's scouting report that said Lee was reluctant to drive to the basket and was weak defensively. This changed Lee's playing style and attitude, including driving to the basket more. Lee stated "'It was something of a shock to read that, although my own coaches had been telling me virtually the same thing'". In his next game, against the school that had issued the scouting report, Lee had 25 points and tied a Vanderbilt record with 26 rebounds.

Two games later, in early January 1965, Lee scored 41 points against the Kentucky Wildcats. This was the most points any individual player had ever scored in a game against Kentucky. At least as of 2013, it was still the most points any Vanderbilt player had ever scored against Kentucky. The following month, he had a 33-point game against Kentucky, and later set the single game Vanderbilt rebounding record with 27 against Georgia.

Lee led the SEC in scoring (22.5 points per game and 631 points) and rebounding (15 per game and 420 rebounds) that season, while leading Vanderbilt to its first SEC title. He shattered several school records along the way that season. Lee set school marks for most points (631) and field goals (239) in one season, and his 420 total rebounds that year is still a Vanderbilt record (as of 2025–26). His point total and field goal total stood as school records until 1992–93, when broken by Bill McCaffrey.

The Commodores finished the season with a 24–4 record and their first SEC championship with a 15–1 mark. Lee was selected for the first of two consecutive SEC Player of the Year Awards. This was the first SEC championship in any sport for Vanderbilt. Lee was a second-team consensus All-American.

Clyde Lee's #43 was retired by Vanderbilt

Vanderbilt played in the 1965 NCAA University Division basketball tournament. They defeated DePaul in the Mideast Regional semifinals, 83–78. Lee had 24 points and 15 rebounds in the game. The Commodores reached the NCAA Mideast Regional finals against the top-ranked Michigan Wolverines, who were favored by 10½ points. Michigan won 87–85, but not before Lee outplayed the Wolverines' Bill Buntin in a highly anticipated matchup in the middle. Lee had 28 points and 20 rebounds in the loss (to Buntin's 26 points and 14 rebounds; with Michigan's Cazzie Russell also scoring 26 points, with 11 in the final five minutes to win the game). Lee had played with four fouls during the entire second half. The game included one of the most controversial calls by a referee in tournament history, potentially costing Vanderbilt the game. Lee was named the Mideast Regional's Most Valuable Player. He was also a member of the NCAA All-Tournament Team.

In his senior season (1965–66), Lee continued his dominance in the paint area. He grabbed the most rebounds in one game by a Commodores player in their history, a January 1966 game against Ole Miss where he had 29 points to go along with his 28 rebounds. Vanderbilt had a 22–4 record, and was ranked by the Associated Press as high as No. 2 during the season, finishing as the No. 8 ranked team nationally.

Two of their four losses came against Kentucky, which reached the NCAA championship game that season and was ranked No. 1 at the end of the season by the Associated Press. In the first loss to the then No. 2 ranked Kentucky, 96–83, Lee had 30 points for the No. 3 ranked Vanderbilt. Lee had 23 points and 14 rebounds in the second loss to Kentucky. The Commodores did not qualify for the NCAA tournament, coming in second to Kentucky in the SEC.

Lee averaged 22.7 points and 15.8 rebounds per game that season. This is still the school's single season rebounding record through 2025–26. Lee was a consensus first team All-American in 1966. The Associated Press and United Press International named him to their All-American first-team, along with Cazzie Russell among others. He won another SEC Player of the Year Award in 1966 (along with Kentucky's Pat Riley), and was first-team All-SEC. United Press International selected Lee solely as its SEC Player of the Year, and made him a unanimous choice on the All-SEC first team. Sportswriter Howell Pesier called him "the greatest player in Vanderbilt history".

Lee averaged 21.4 points and 15.5 rebounds over his 79-game college career, leading Vanderbilt to 65 victories over three seasons. Lee holds the Vanderbilt record for career scoring average (21.4 points per game), most career rebounds (1,223), and career rebounding percentage (15.5 rebounds per game). Midway through his senior season, Lee broke the school's all-time total career points record, finishing his three-year Vanderbilt career with a new record 1,691 points (which ranks seventh all-time for Vanderbilt through the 2025–26 season).

== NBA career ==
=== San Francisco/Golden State Warriors ===
After four years at Vanderbilt, Lee was selected by the San Francisco Warriors with third overall pick of the 1966 NBA draft behind Cazzie Russell, taken first by the New York Knicks, and Dave Bing taken second by the Detroit Pistons. In 1966–1967, as a rookie, Lee averaged 7.4 rebounds per game while playing only 16.9 minutes per game. Lee and the Warriors made the NBA Finals, where they were defeated in six games by Wilt Chamberlain and the Philadelphia 76ers. Lee played in five games, averaging 18.2 minutes, 6.4 points, and 7.2 rebounds per game in the series.

In his second year (1967–68), Lee averaged nearly 12 points and 14 rebounds per game, in 33 minutes per game. He was fourth in the NBA in rebounding (13.9 rebounds per game) that season, behind only Hall of Famers Chamberlain, Jerry Lucas, and Bill Russell. Lee appeared in the 1968 NBA All-Star Game, with six points and 11 rebounds in only 18 minutes of playing time.

The Warriors defeated the St. Louis Hawks in six games to win the 1968 Western Division semifinal playoffs. Lee led the team in minutes played (40.2) and rebounding (11.7 rebounds per game), while averaging 12.2 points and 2.3 assists per game. He had 19 points and 22 rebounds in the Warriors' Game 3 win. The Warriors reached the Western Division finals again, but were swept by the Los Angeles Lakers, with Lee averaging 10.3 points and 15.5 rebounds a game.

During his next two seasons with the Warriors, Lee again averaged a double-double (10.7 points and 13.8 rebounds per game for 1968–69, and 11 points and 11.3 rebounds in 1969–70). He was ninth in the NBA in rebounds per game in 1968–69, and tenth the following season. In the 1970–71 season, Lee only played 17 minutes per game as a backup center, behind future Hall of Fame center Nate Thurmond.

Lee became the Warriors starting power forward in the 1971–72 season. He averaged a career-high 14.5 rebounds per game, eighth best in the NBA that season; while averaging over 30 rebounds a game in combination with Thurmond. In the five game 1972 Western Division semifinal loss to the Milwaukee Bucks, Lee averaged 12.8 rebounds per game.

Lee played two more seasons after that with the Warriors (1972 to 74). He averaged 22.4 minutes, 9.1 rebounds, and 6.3 points per game in 1972–73; and 30.4 minutes, 11.1 rebounds, and 5.9 points per game the following season. The Warriors beat the Bucks in six games in the 1973 Western Conference semifinals. Lee averaged 41.8 minutes, 11.2 points, and 17 rebounds per game against Kareem Abdul-Jabbar and the Bucks. He led all players in rebounds in the Warriors' four winning games (Game 2, 17 rebounds; Game 4, 21 rebounds, Game 5, 18 rebounds, and Game 6, 19 rebounds). In the 1973 Western Conference finals, the Warriors lost to the Lakers in five games. Lee averaged a double-double in five games, with 10 points and 14.2 rebounds per game.

In Lee's eight years with the Warriors, he averaged 27.5 minutes, 8.5 points, and 11 rebounds per game with the Warriors. He was fourth in the NBA in rebounding average in 1967–68, and was top-10 three other times (1968–69, 1969–70, 1971–72). During Lee's Warriors' career, the team reached the playoffs six times. In 51 career playoff games (all but three with the Warriors), Lee averaged 10.2 rebounds per game in only 26.3 minutes per game.

=== Trade to Atlanta Hawks ===
Lee was sent to the Atlanta Hawks on October 4, 1974, to complete a trade from February 2, 1970 between the Hawks and the Warriors. In that February 1970 trade, the Warriors acquired the NBA contractual rights to Zelmo Beaty in exchange for the Warriors' first-round pick in the 1970 NBA draft (which eventually became Pete Maravich, who was selected third overall). The terms of the trade also included a provision that Lee would be sent to the Hawks if the Hawks were able to sign Beaty. Beaty had signed a contract to join the Los Angeles Stars of the American Basketball Associationin October 1969, and after sitting out one season played for the team as the Utah Stars from 1970 to 1974.

The Hawks signed Beaty over four years later, in September 1974, and traded him the same day to the Los Angeles Lakers. The Hawks then demanded the Warriors had to send Lee to the Hawks, but the Warriors took the position that the 1970 contract provided they only had to trade Lee if the Hawks signed Beaty by September 30, 1970. The Hawks demanded that NBA commissioner J. Walter Kennedy require the Warriors to send Lee to the Hawks. Kennedy ruled in the Hawks' favor, finding no temporal limitation on signing Beaty; completing the trade four years and eight months after it was made.

=== Atlanta Hawks and Philadelphia 76ers ===
After only nine games with the Hawks, Lee was traded along with a third-round pick in the 1975 NBA draft (39th overall–Jimmie Baker) to the Philadelphia 76ers for Tom Van Arsdale on November 8, 1974. Lee then concluded his career in Philadelphia, playing his final two seasons. Playing center for the 76ers in 1974–75, Lee averaged 32.1 minutes, 5.8 points, and 9.7 rebounds per game (17th best in the NBA). In his final NBA season (1975–76), Lee was a reserve center, averaging 18 minutes and 5.7 rebounds per game.

The 76ers waived Lee before the 1976–77 season. In late December 1976, Warriors coach Al Attles approached Lee to come out of retirement to join the Warriors, expecting him to eventually join the team. Lee was still under contract to the 76ers, however, who were paying Lee even though he did not make the team. The 76ers wanted to insure that they had Lee available as a backup if necessary; and to prevent him from joining another team. The Warriors were unable to negotiate a deal with the Sixers that would have allowed Lee to join the Warriors.

In 10 NBA seasons (1966 to 1976) spent with the Warriors (1966 to 1974), Atlanta Hawks (1974), and Philadelphia 76ers (1974 to 1976), Lee scored 5,733 points (7.7 points per game) with 7,626 rebounds (10.3 rebounds per game) in 742 games.

== Legacy and honors ==
After Vanderbilt's success during Lee's tenure, the balconies in the school's Memorial Gym were constructed to increase seating capacity, and were called “the balconies that Clyde Lee built”. In 1966, Vanderbilt designated "Clyde Lee Day" on the occasion of Lee's last career home game. In 2008, Lee was named to the Vanderbilt Athletics Hall of Fame as part of its inaugural class. Lee was the first Vanderbilt player to have his number retired. He was inducted into the Tennessee Sports Hall of Fame in 1995. North Carolina future Hall of Fame head coach Dean Smith said of Lee, "'He is a great one'".

Lee ranks 45th in NBA history in rebounds per game and 55th among combined NBA and ABA players (through the 2025–26 season). His 13.81 rebounds per 36 minutes ranks 14th in NBA history, and 17th in combined NBA/ABA history. A strong rebounder and defender, Lee said, “It's what you might consider the dirty work, but that's the way I'm able to play in the league. . . . I don't feel that I'm a good shooter, but then again I don't feel I have to score. I don't look for the shot. I try to get an offensive rebound or keep the ball alive. This is my value to the team." Vanderbilt coach Roy Skinner said of Lee's rebounding ability, "'His quickness was the main thing, and he had real good hands. He didn't fumble any. He went after it hard and he just kept getting better'".

== Personal life ==
After retirement, Lee was a managing partner at a commercial real estate business in Nashville. Lee has taught yoga classes at Vanderbilt and in the Nashville area, after discovering yoga in the 1980s to alleviate pain from basketball injuries. He worked with all of Vanderbilt's sports team other than the football and basketball teams. Some of Lee's old teammates came to his classes.

He has served as a color commentator for radio broadcasts of Vanderbilt men's basketball games.

== NBA career statistics ==
Legend
| GP | Games played | GS | Games started | MPG | Minutes per game |
| FG% | Field goal percentage | 3P% | 3-point field goal percentage | FT% | Free throw percentage |
| RPG | Rebounds per game | APG | Assists per game | SPG | Steals per game |
| BPG | Blocks per game | PPG | Points per game | **Bold** | Career high |

=== Regular season ===
| Year | Team | GP | MPG | FG% | FT% | RPG | APG | STL | BLK | PPG |
|---|---|---|---|---|---|---|---|---|---|---|
| 1966–67 | San Francisco | 74 | 16.9 | .408 | .633 | 7.4 | 1.0 | – | – | 7.0 |
| 1967–68 | San Francisco | **82** | 32.9 | .417 | .684 | 13.9 | **1.6** | – | – | **11.9** |
| 1968–69 | San Francisco | 65 | **34.4** | .398 | .625 | 13.8 | 1.3 | – | – | 10.7 |
| 1969–70 | San Francisco | **82** | 32.2 | .440 | .593 | 11.3 | 1.0 | – | – | 11.0 |
| 1970–71 | San Francisco | **82** | 17.0 | .453 | .558 | 7.0 | .8 | – | – | 6.1 |
| 1971–72 | Golden State | 78 | 34.3 | **.471** | .541 | **14.5** | 1.1 | – | – | 8.1 |
| 1972–73 | Golden State | 66 | 22.4 | .466 | .565 | 9.1 | .5 | – | – | 6.3 |
| 1973–74 | Golden State | 54 | 30.4 | .454 | .579 | 11.1 | 1.3 | **.5** | .3 | 5.9 |
| 1974–75 | Atlanta | 9 | 19.7 | .333 | **.821** | 7.8 | .9 | .1 | **.4** | 6.2 |
| 1974–75 | Philadelphia | 71 | 32.1 | .419 | .630 | 9.7 | 1.4 | .4 | .2 | 5.8 |
| 1975–76 | Philadelphia | 79 | 18.0 | .436 | .663 | 5.7 | .7 | .3 | .3 | 3.9 |
| Career | | 742 | 26.8 | .432 | .614 | 10.3 | 1.1 | .4 | .3 | 7.7 |
| All-Star | | 1 | 18.0 | .250 | .500 | 11.0 | 2.0 | – | – | 6.0 |

=== Playoffs ===
| Year | Team | GP | MPG | FG% | FT% | RPG | APG | STL | BLK | PPG |
|---|---|---|---|---|---|---|---|---|---|---|
| 1967 | San Francisco | **11** | 11.8 | .333 | .200 | 4.9 | .7 | – | – | 3.6 |
| 1968 | San Francisco | 10 | **40.5** | .410 | .500 | 13.2 | **2.2** | – | – | **11.4** |
| 1969 | San Francisco | 6 | 21.5 | .273 | .818 | 7.2 | .8 | – | – | 4.5 |
| 1971 | San Francisco | 5 | 18.6 | .417 | .500 | 7.4 | .4 | – | – | 4.8 |
| 1972 | Golden State | 5 | 35.0 | .286 | .667 | 12.8 | 1.4 | – | – | 4.8 |
| 1973 | Golden State | **11** | 37.5 | .466 | .656 | **15.7** | 1.5 | – | – | 10.6 |
| 1976 | Philadelphia | 3 | 17.7 | **.677** | **.857** | 5.3 | .3 | .0 | **.3** | 4.7 |
| Career | | 51 | 27.4 | .397 | .586 | 10.2 | 1.2 | .0 | .3 | 7.1 |
