= 1967–68 Los Angeles Lakers season =

NBA professional basketball team season

- Head coach: Butch Van Breda Kolff
- General manager: Fred Schaus
- Owner: Jack Kent Cooke
- Arena: Los Angeles Memorial Sports Arena (through December 22, 1967); The Forum (starting December 31, 1967)

Results
- Record: 52–30 (.634)
- Place: Division: 2nd (Western)
- Playoff finish: NBA Finals (lost to Celtics 2–4)
- Stats at Basketball Reference

Local media
- Television: KTLA
- Radio: KNX

The 1967–68 Los Angeles Lakers season was the Lakers' 20th season in the NBA and eighth season in Los Angeles. This was the first season the Lakers uniforms featured what would become the signature gold and purple colors. This was also the first season the team played at The Forum in Inglewood, where the Lakers would achieve fame in the immediate future, and played 31 seasons at this venue.

The Lakers won the Western Division and faced the Boston Celtics in the NBA Finals for the sixth time in 10 years, falling to them once again, 4–2.

== Roster ==
1967–68 Los Angeles Lakers roster
Players

| Pos. | No. | Player | Height | Weight | DOB | From |
|---|---|---|---|---|---|---|
| SG | 30 | Cliff Anderson | 6 ft 2 in (1.88 m) | 200 lb (91 kg) | 1944-09-07 | Saint Joseph's |
| PF | 23 | Jim Barnes | 6 ft 8 in (2.03 m) | 210 lb (95 kg) | 1941-04-13 | UTEP |
| SF | 22 | Elgin Baylor | 6 ft 5 in (1.96 m) | 225 lb (102 kg) | 1934-09-16 | Seattle |
| SG | 21 | Archie Clark | 6 ft 2 in (1.88 m) | 175 lb (79 kg) | 1941-07-15 | Minnesota |
| C | 31 | Mel Counts | 7 ft 0 in (2.13 m) | 230 lb (104 kg) | 1941-10-16 | Oregon State |
| SG | 12 | Freddie Crawford | 6 ft 4 in (1.93 m) | 189 lb (86 kg) | 1941-12-33 | St. Bonaventure |
| SG | 11 | Gail Goodrich | 6 ft 1 in (1.85 m) | 170 lb (77 kg) | 1943-04-23 | UCLA |
| PF | 52 | Dennis Hamilton | 6 ft 8 in (2.03 m) | 210 lb (95 kg) | 1944-05-08 | Notre Dame |
| SF | 33 | Tom Hawkins | 6 ft 5 in (1.96 m) | 210 lb (95 kg) | 1936-12-22 | Notre Dame |
| C | 14 | Darrall Imhoff | 6 ft 10 in (2.08 m) | 220 lb (100 kg) | 1938-10-11 | California |
| C | 34 | Erwin Mueller | 6 ft 8 in (2.03 m) | 230 lb (104 kg) | 1944-03-12 | San Francisco |
| PG | 44 | Jerry West | 6 ft 3 in (1.91 m) | 175 lb (79 kg) | 1938-05-28 | West Virginia |
| SF | 24 | John Wetzel | 6 ft 5 in (1.96 m) | 190 lb (86 kg) | 1944-10-22 | Virginia Tech |

Coaches
Head coach
- Butch van Breda Kolff

Legend
- (DP) Unsigned draft pick
- (FA) Free agent
- (S) Suspended
- Injured

Roster
Updated: January 12, 1968

== Regular season ==
=== Season standings ===
| Western Division | W | L | PCT | GB | Home | Road | Neutral | Div |
|---|---|---|---|---|---|---|---|---|
| x-St. Louis Hawks | 56 | 26 | .683 | – | 25–7 | 22–13 | 9–6 | 31–9 |
| x-Los Angeles Lakers | 52 | 30 | .634 | 4 | 30–11 | 18–19 | 4–0 | 28–12 |
| x-San Francisco Warriors | 43 | 39 | .524 | 13 | 27–14 | 16–23 | 0–2 | 24–16 |
| x-Chicago Bulls | 29 | 53 | .354 | 27 | 11–22 | 12–24 | 6–7 | 11–29 |
| Seattle SuperSonics | 23 | 59 | .280 | 33 | 10–21 | 7–24 | 6–14 | 15–25 |
| San Diego Rockets | 15 | 67 | .183 | 41 | 8–33 | 4–26 | 3–8 | 11–29 |

=== Game log ===
1967–68 game log
| # | Date | Opponent | Score | High points | Record |
| 1 | October 17 | @ Chicago | 107–105 | Elgin Baylor (21) | 1–0 |
| 2 | October 18 | @ Philadelphia | 87–103 | Elgin Baylor (24) | 1–1 |
| 3 | October 19 | @ St. Louis | 95–100 | Elgin Baylor (25) | 1–2 |
| 4 | October 21 | @ New York | 114–106 | Baylor, Clark (25) | 2–2 |
| 5 | October 25 | Cincinnati | 116–132 | Elgin Baylor (33) | 3–2 |
| 6 | October 27 | Chicago | 117–125 | Archie Clark (39) | 4–2 |
| 7 | October 29 | Baltimore | 105–118 | Archie Clark (33) | 5–2 |
| 8 | November 1 | New York | 129–113 | Elgin Baylor (23) | 5–3 |
| 9 | November 3 | @ Boston | 104–105 | Elgin Baylor (25) | 5–4 |
| 10 | November 4 | @ Cincinnati | 106–104 | Elgin Baylor (42) | 6–4 |
| 11 | November 11 | Philadelphia | 115–111 | Elgin Baylor (35) | 6–5 |
| 12 | November 12 | Chicago | 96–97 | Gail Goodrich (21) | 7–5 |
| 13 | November 15 | Chicago | 115–124 | Archie Clark (24) | 8–5 |
| 14 | November 17 | @ Baltimore | 107–116 | Elgin Baylor (29) | 8–6 |
| 15 | November 18 | @ St. Louis | 127–107 | Mel Counts (23) | 9–6 |
| 16 | November 21 | @ Seattle | 132–137 | Elgin Baylor (34) | 9–7 |
| 17 | November 23 | Detroit | 120–132 | Archie Clark (30) | 10–7 |
| 18 | November 24 | @ San Francisco | 121–122 (OT) | Elgin Baylor (29) | 10–8 |
| 19 | November 25 | San Francisco | 131–112 | Elgin Baylor (22) | 10–9 |
| 20 | November 26 | St. Louis | 105–109 | Archie Clark (20) | 11–9 |
| 21 | November 28 | St. Louis | 117–134 | Jerry West (30) | 12–9 |
| 22 | November 29 | @ Detroit | 123–127 | Elgin Baylor (30) | 12–10 |
| 23 | December 1 | @ Boston | 119–123 | Elgin Baylor (29) | 12–11 |
| 24 | December 2 | @ New York | 122–106 | Jerry West (24) | 13–11 |
| 25 | December 5 | @ Philadelphia | 128–122 (OT) | Elgin Baylor (32) | 14–11 |
| 26 | December 6 | @ Baltimore | 136–125 | Jerry West (32) | 15–11 |
| 27 | December 8 | @ Detroit | 115–103 | Jerry West (27) | 16–11 |
| 28 | December 9 | @ San Diego | 127–109 | Archie Clark (32) | 17–11 |
| 29 | December 10 | @ Seattle | 123–133 | Elgin Baylor (35) | 17–12 |
| 30 | December 14 | Chicago | 106–101 | Jerry West (30) | 17–13 |
| 31 | December 17 | Boston | 123–117 | Jerry West (28) | 17–14 |
| 32 | December 20 | New York | 138–131 | Jerry West (32) | 17–15 |
| 33 | December 22 | Detroit | 105–133 | Elgin Baylor (25) | 18–15 |
| 34 | December 25 | @ San Diego | 101–104 | Elgin Baylor (21) | 18–16 |
| 35 | December 26 | @ Chicago | 104–101 | Archie Clark (24) | 19–16 |
| 36 | December 27 | @ Cincinnati | 127–132 | Mel Counts (30) | 19–17 |
| 37 | December 29 | @ New York | 126–115 | Jerry West (30) | 20–17 |
| 38 | December 30 | @ St. Louis | 106–104 | Jerry West (34) | 21–17 |
| 39 | December 31 | San Diego | 118–147 | Archie Clark (31) | 22–17 |
| 40 | January 2 | @ San Francisco | 118–119 | Jerry West (29) | 22–18 |
| 41 | January 3 | Boston | 113–103 | Jerry West (27) | 22–19 |
| 42 | January 5 | @ Philadelphia | 113–125 | Elgin Baylor (23) | 22–20 |
| 43 | January 6 | @ Baltimore | 127–130 (OT) | Elgin Baylor (39) | 22–21 |
| 44 | January 10 | New York | 115–101 | Archie Clark (22) | 22–22 |
| 45 | January 17 | Philadelphia | 116–125 | Jerry West (39) | 23–22 |
| 46 | January 20 | San Francisco | 122–151 | Elgin Baylor (30) | 24–22 |
| 47 | January 21 | Seattle | 123–154 | Elgin Baylor (29) | 25–22 |
| 48 | January 25 | N Cincinnati | 118–116 | Elgin Baylor (28) | 26–22 |
| 49 | January 26 | @ Boston | 118–112 | Elgin Baylor (33) | 27–22 |
| 50 | January 27 | @ Detroit | 119–125 | Gail Goodrich (23) | 27–23 |
| 51 | January 28 | N St. Louis | 113–128 | Elgin Baylor (29) | 28–23 |
| 52 | January 30 | @ Seattle | 116–128 | Jerry West (27) | 28–24 |
| 53 | January 31 | St. Louis | 102–110 | Elgin Baylor (33) | 29–24 |
| 54 | February 2 | Seattle | 113–151 | Elgin Baylor (25) | 30–24 |
| 55 | February 3 | San Diego | 122–133 | Jerry West (42) | 31–24 |
| 56 | February 4 | Seattle | 131–137 | Jerry West (43) | 32–24 |
| 57 | February 6 | Cincinnati | 102–146 | Elgin Baylor (26) | 33–24 |
| 58 | February 8 | @ Seattle | 110–115 | Jerry West (34) | 33–25 |
| 59 | February 9 | San Francisco | 104–122 | Elgin Baylor (30) | 34–25 |
| 60 | February 11 | @ Boston | 141–104 | Jerry West (24) | 35–25 |
| 61 | February 13 | @ Baltimore | 119–116 (OT) | Jerry West (47) | 36–25 |
| 62 | February 15 | N Chicago | 132–105 | Jerry West (31) | 37–25 |
| 63 | February 16 | @ San Francisco | 116–118 | Jerry West (36) | 37–26 |
| 64 | February 17 | Philadelphia | 135–134 (2OT) | Jerry West (49) | 37–27 |
| 65 | February 21 | Boston | 117–122 | Jerry West (34) | 38–27 |
| 66 | February 23 | Cincinnati | 115–131 | Jerry West (29) | 39–27 |
| 67 | February 25 | @ San Diego | 127–112 | Elgin Baylor (41) | 40–27 |
| 68 | February 27 | Cincinnati | 106–117 | Elgin Baylor (40) | 41–27 |
| 69 | February 29 | N Chicago | 117–107 | Elgin Baylor (27) | 42–27 |
| 70 | March 2 | Seattle | 121–127 | Elgin Baylor (26) | 43–27 |
| 71 | March 3 | Baltimore | 114–121 | Elgin Baylor (33) | 44–27 |
| 72 | March 6 | St. Louis | 112–96 | Elgin Baylor (20) | 44–28 |
| 73 | March 7 | @ San Diego | 119–102 | Elgin Baylor (35) | 45–28 |
| 74 | March 8 | San Diego | 122–130 | Baylor, Clark (23) | 46–28 |
| 75 | March 9 | @ San Francisco | 137–132 (OT) | Elgin Baylor (38) | 47–28 |
| 76 | March 10 | Baltimore | 119–89 | Erwin Mueller (16) | 47–29 |
| 77 | March 13 | San Francisco | 106–142 | Elgin Baylor (25) | 48–29 |
| 78 | March 15 | New York | 112–123 | Elgin Baylor (37) | 49–29 |
| 79 | March 16 | Detroit | 108–135 | Gail Goodrich (30) | 50–29 |
| 80 | March 17 | Detroit | 116–120 | Elgin Baylor (28) | 51–29 |
| 81 | March 18 | @ Philadelphia | 128–158 | Mel Counts (26) | 51–30 |
| 82 | March 19 | San Diego | 109–121 | Elgin Baylor (35) | 52–30 |

== Playoffs ==
1968 playoff game log
Division Semi-finals: 4–1 (home: 3–0; road: 1–1)

| Game | Date | Team | Score | High points | High rebounds | High assists | Location Attendance | Series |
|---|---|---|---|---|---|---|---|---|
| 1 | March 24 | Chicago | W 109–101 | Jerry West (33) | Elgin Baylor (23) | Elgin Baylor (8) | The Forum; 7,352 | 1–0 |
| 2 | March 25 | Chicago | W 111–106 | Jerry West (35) | Elgin Baylor (16) | Jerry West (8) | The Forum; 8,158 | 2–0 |
| 3 | March 27 | @ Chicago | L 98–104 | Jerry West (32) | Darrall Imhoff (15) | Elgin Baylor (5) | Chicago Stadium; 3,456 | 2–1 |
| 4 | March 29 | @ Chicago | W 93–87 | Elgin Baylor (27) | Darrall Imhoff (21) | Elgin Baylor (5) | Chicago Stadium; 5,678 | 3–1 |
| 5 | March 31 | Chicago | W 122–99 | Elgin Baylor (37) | Elgin Baylor (12) | Archie Clark (10) | The Forum; 12,108 | 4–1 |

Division finals: 4–0 (home: 2–0; road: 2–0)

| Game | Date | Team | Score | High points | High rebounds | High assists | Location Attendance | Series |
|---|---|---|---|---|---|---|---|---|
| 1 | April 5 | San Francisco | W 133–105 | Elgin Baylor (29) | Elgin Baylor (16) | Archie Clark (5) | The Forum; 10,319 | 1–0 |
| 2 | April 10 | San Francisco | W 115–112 | Baylor, West (36) | Elgin Baylor (19) | Jerry West (5) | The Forum; 11,270 | 2–0 |
| 3 | April 11 | @ San Francisco | W 128–124 | Jerry West (40) | Elgin Baylor (12) | Jerry West (8) | Cow Palace; 9,232 | 3–0 |
| 4 | April 13 | @ San Francisco | W 106–100 | Jerry West (29) | Elgin Baylor (20) | Archie Clark (5) | Cow Palace; 9,623 | 4–0 |

NBA Finals: 2–4 (home: 1–2; road: 1–2)

| Game | Date | Team | Score | High points | High rebounds | High assists | Location Attendance | Series |
|---|---|---|---|---|---|---|---|---|
| 1 | April 21 | @ Boston | L 101–107 | Jerry West (25) | Darrall Imhoff (14) | Archie Clark (5) | Boston Garden; 9,546 | 0–1 |
| 2 | April 24 | @ Boston | W 123–113 | Jerry West (35) | Darrall Imhoff (11) | Erwin Mueller (7) | Boston Garden; 14,780 | 1–1 |
| 3 | April 26 | Boston | L 119–127 | Jerry West (33) | Elgin Baylor (18) | Jerry West (9) | The Forum; 17,011 | 1–2 |
| 4 | April 28 | Boston | W 118–105 | Jerry West (38) | Darrall Imhoff (20) | Darrall Imhoff (6) | The Forum; 17,147 | 2–2 |
| 5 | April 30 | @ Boston | L 117–120 (OT) | Jerry West (35) | Elgin Baylor (15) | Baylor, West (6) | Boston Garden; 14,780 | 2–3 |
| 6 | May 2 | Boston | L 109–124 | Elgin Baylor (28) | Mel Counts (25) | Elgin Baylor (6) | The Forum; 17,392 | 2–4 |

1968 schedule

== Awards and records ==
- Elgin Baylor, All-NBA First Team
- Jerry West, All-NBA Second Team
- Elgin Baylor, NBA All-Star Game
- Jerry West, NBA All-Star Game
- Archie Clark, NBA All-Star Game
