= 1967–68 San Diego Rockets season =

American professional basketball season

- Head coach: Jack McMahon
- General manager: Jack McMahon
- Owner: Bob Breitbard
- Arena: San Diego Sports Arena

Results
- Record: 15–67 (.183)
- Place: Division: 6th (Western)
- Playoff finish: Did not qualify
- Stats at Basketball Reference

Local media
- Television: KFMB-TV
- Radio: KFMB

The 1967–68 San Diego Rockets season was the Rockets' inaugural season in the NBA.

== Offseason ==
=== Draft picks ===
Round	Pick	Player	Position	Nationality	College
1	7	Pat Riley	G/F	United States	
2	18	Bob Netolicky	F/C	United States	
3	31	Nick Jones	G	United States	

== Roster ==
1967–68 San Diego Rockets roster
Players

Pos.	No.	Player	Height	Weight	DOB	From
SF	24	Bud Acton	6 ft 6 in (1.98 m)	210 lb (95 kg)	1942-01-11	Hillsdale
SG	33	Jim Barnett	6 ft 4 in (1.93 m)	170 lb (77 kg)	1944-07-07	Oregon
PG	30	John Barnhill	6 ft 1 in (1.85 m)	180 lb (82 kg)	1938-03-20	Tennessee State
C	34	John Block	6 ft 9 in (2.06 m)	207 lb (94 kg)	1944-04-16	USC
SG	31	Tyrone Britt	6 ft 4 in (1.93 m)	190 lb (86 kg)	1944-04-18	Johnson C. Smith
C	17	Henry Finkel	7 ft 0 in (2.13 m)	240 lb (109 kg)	1942-04-20	Dayton
PF	20	Dave Gambee	6 ft 6 in (1.98 m)	215 lb (98 kg)	1937-04-16	Oregon State
PF	24	Johnny Green	6 ft 5 in (1.96 m)	200 lb (91 kg)	1933-12-08	Michigan State
PG	12	Nick Jones	6 ft 2 in (1.88 m)	190 lb (86 kg)	1945-03-28	Oregon
PF	7	Toby Kimball	6 ft 6 in (1.98 m)	220 lb (100 kg)	1942-09-07	Connecticut
SF	44	Don Kojis	6 ft 5 in (1.96 m)	215 lb (98 kg)	1939-01-15	Marquette
SG	11	Jon McGlocklin	6 ft 5 in (1.96 m)	205 lb (93 kg)	1943-06-10	Indiana
SG	42	Pat Riley	6 ft 4 in (1.93 m)	205 lb (93 kg)	1945-03-20	Kentucky
PF	27	Jim Ware	6 ft 7 in (2.01 m)	210 lb (95 kg)	1944-05-02	Oklahoma City
PG	14	Art Williams	6 ft 1 in (1.85 m)	180 lb (82 kg)	1939-09-29	Cal Poly Pomona

Coaches
Head coach
- Jack McMahon

Legend
- (DP) Unsigned draft pick
- (FA) Free agent
- (S) Suspended
- Injured

Roster
Updated: February 1, 1968

== Regular season ==
=== Season standings ===
Western Division	W	L	PCT	GB	Home	Road	Neutral	Div
x-St. Louis Hawks	56	26	.683	–	25–7	22–13	9–6	31–9
x-Los Angeles Lakers	52	30	.634	4	30–11	18–19	4–0	28–12
x-San Francisco Warriors	43	39	.524	13	27–14	16–23	0–2	24–16
x-Chicago Bulls	29	53	.354	27	11–22	12–24	6–7	11–29
Seattle SuperSonics	23	59	.280	33	10–21	7–24	6–14	15–25
San Diego Rockets	15	67	.183	41	8–33	4–26	3–8	11–29

=== Game log ===
1967–68 Game log
#	Date	Opponent	Score	High points	Record
1	October 14	St. Louis	99–98	Johnny Green (25)	0–1
2	October 17	St. Louis	123–105	Don Kojis (22)	0–2
3	October 20	@ Seattle	121–114	John Block (32)	1–2
4	October 21	Seattle	117–110 (OT)	Don Kojis (32)	1–3
5	October 22	@ San Francisco	126–137	Don Kojis (23)	1–4
6	October 25	Baltimore	125–109	John Block (23)	1–5
7	October 27	Cincinnati	116–113	Johnny Green (24)	1–6
8	October 29	Cincinnati	108–99	Johnny Green (21)	1–7
9	November 1	N Seattle	139–125	John Block (31)	2–7
10	November 4	New York	125–121	Johnny Green (35)	2–8
11	November 5	New York	115–107	Barnett, Williams (16)	2–9
12	November 7	Philadelphia	130–105	Dave Gambee (20)	2–10
13	November 8	Philadelphia	129–114	John Block (24)	2–11
14	November 11	@ Cincinnati	108–109	John Block (20)	2–12
15	November 12	@ St. Louis	105–116	Don Kojis (24)	2–13
16	November 14	@ New York	109–122	John Block (18)	2–14
17	November 15	N New York	122–108	Dave Gambee (24)	3–14
18	November 16	Chicago	91–99	Jon McGlocklin (22)	4–14
19	November 17	@ Seattle	124–130	Block, Williams (24)	4–15
20	November 18	San Francisco	142–124	Gambee, Kojis (17)	4–16
21	November 21	N Boston	114–121	Don Kojis (28)	4–17
22	November 22	@ Boston	110–124	Jon McGlocklin (21)	4–18
23	November 23	@ Philadelphia	117–128	John Block (24)	4–19
24	November 24	@ Detroit	122–130	Don Kojis (22)	4–20
25	November 25	@ St. Louis	109–110	Don Kojis (25)	4–21
26	November 30	St. Louis	129–87	Dave Gambee (20)	4–22
27	December 2	San Francisco	103–127	Johnny Green (31)	5–22
28	December 5	N Detroit	110–111	Don Kojis (27)	5–23
29	December 7	@ Chicago	118–108	Johnny Green (23)	6–23
30	December 8	@ San Francisco	137–107	John Block (36)	7–23
31	December 9	Los Angeles	127–109	Block, Kojis (21)	7–24
32	December 12	Chicago	104–118	Jon McGlocklin (27)	8–24
33	December 15	N Boston	101–114	John Block (27)	8–25
34	December 16	@ New York	102–126	John Block (28)	8–26
35	December 17	Detroit	115–117	John Block (34)	9–26
36	December 20	Boston	126–116	Johnny Green (25)	9–27
37	December 22	@ San Francisco	97–103	John Block (24)	9–28
38	December 23	Detroit	123–119	Dave Gambee (29)	9–29
39	December 25	Los Angeles	101–104	John Block (20)	10–29
40	December 28	@ Seattle	143–125	Don Kojis (26)	11–29
41	December 31	@ Los Angeles	118–147	John Block (29)	11–30
42	January 3	St. Louis	124–126 (2OT)	John Block (32)	12–30
43	January 6	Seattle	122–104	John Block (28)	12–31
44	January 9	New York	118–105	John Barnhill (22)	12–32
45	January 10	Detroit	118–122	Don Kojis (30)	13–32
46	January 12	@ St. Louis	89–111	John Block (19)	13–33
47	January 13	@ Cincinnati	116–122	John Block (30)	13–34
48	January 16	@ Chicago	110–123	Dave Gambee (24)	13–35
49	January 17	N Chicago	110–104	Jon McGlocklin (28)	14–35
50	January 18	N Cincinnati	126–129	Don Kojis (34)	14–36
51	January 21	@ Boston	112–139	Don Kojis (22)	14–37
52	January 25	Baltimore	127–113	Toby Kimball (23)	14–38
53	January 27	Baltimore	123–122	Don Kojis (28)	14–39
54	February 1	San Francisco	128–114	Don Kojis (28)	14–40
55	February 2	@ San Francisco	121–127	Don Kojis (32)	14–41
56	February 3	@ Los Angeles	122–133	Jim Barnett (22)	14–42
57	February 5	N Baltimore	108–121	Don Kojis (20)	14–43
58	February 6	N Detroit	93–120	Jon McGlocklin (19)	14–44
59	February 7	N Philadelphia	103–125	Don Kojis (18)	14–45
60	February 8	N Baltimore	102–106	Don Kojis (24)	14–46
61	February 10	Cincinnati	101–99	Don Kojis (24)	14–47
62	February 11	@ Baltimore	116–136	Henry Finkel (19)	14–48
63	February 13	@ Chicago	102–114	Dave Gambee (25)	14–49
64	February 14	@ New York	102–114	Don Kojis (37)	14–50
65	February 15	San Francisco	134–114	Don Kojis (24)	14–51
66	February 16	Philadelphia	124–108	Don Kojis (25)	14–52
67	February 18	Philadelphia	106–111	Don Kojis (25)	15–52
68	February 23	Seattle	127–122	Art Williams (26)	15–53
69	February 25	Los Angeles	127–112	Don Kojis (30)	15–54
70	February 26	Boston	118–110	Dave Gambee (25)	15–55
71	February 29	Cincinnati	120–114	Henry Finkel (21)	15–56
72	March 1	Baltimore	156–114	Toby Kimball (22)	15–57
73	March 3	@ St. Louis	104–106	Henry Finkel (24)	15–58
74	March 5	@ Philadelphia	103–134	Toby Kimball (22)	15–59
75	March 6	@ Detroit	118–140	Henry Finkel (26)	15–60
76	March 7	Los Angeles	119–102	Henry Finkel (42)	15–61
77	March 8	@ Los Angeles	122–130	Henry Finkel (35)	15–62
78	March 9	Seattle	115–111	Dave Gambee (30)	15–63
79	March 13	Boston	144–118	Dave Gambee (39)	15–64
80	March 17	Chicago	129–121	Henry Finkel (24)	15–65
81	March 19	@ Los Angeles	109–121	Dave Gambee (30)	15–66
82	March 20	Chicago	121–112	Henry Finkel (21)	15–67
