= 1966 NCAA Men's Basketball All-Americans =

- Awarded for: 1965–66 NCAA University Division men's basketball season

The consensus 1966 College Basketball All-American team, as determined by aggregating the results of four major All-American teams. To earn "consensus" status, a player must win honors from a majority of the following teams: the Associated Press, the USBWA, The United Press International and the National Association of Basketball Coaches.

== 1966 Consensus All-America team ==
Consensus First Team
Player	Position	Class	Team
Dave Bing	G	Senior	Syracuse
Clyde Lee	F	Senior	Vanderbilt
Cazzie Russell	F	Senior	Michigan
Dave Schellhase	G/F	Senior	Purdue
Jimmy Walker	G	Junior	Providence

Consensus Second Team
Player	Position	Class	Team
Louie Dampier	G	Junior	Kentucky
Matt Guokas	G	Junior	St. Joseph's
Jack Marin	F	Senior	Duke
Dick Snyder	F	Senior	Davidson
Bob Verga	G	Senior	Duke
Walt Wesley	C	Senior	Kansas

== Individual All-America teams ==
All-America Team
All-America Team	First team		Second team		Third team	
All-America Team	Player	School	Player	School	Player	School
Associated Press	Dave Bing	Syracuse	Matt Guokas	Saint Joseph's	Henry Finkel	Dayton
Associated Press	Louie Dampier	Kentucky	Jack Marin	Duke	Thad Jaracz	Kentucky
Associated Press	Clyde Lee	Vanderbilt	Dick Snyder	Davidson	Bob Lewis	North Carolina
Associated Press	Cazzie Russell	Michigan	Bob Verga	Duke	Pat Riley	Kentucky
Associated Press	Dave Schellhase	Purdue	Jimmy Walker	Providence	Walt Wesley	Kansas
USBWA	Dave Bing	Syracuse	No second or third teams (10-man first team)			
USBWA	Clyde Lee	Vanderbilt	No second or third teams (10-man first team)			
USBWA	Jack Marin	Duke	No second or third teams (10-man first team)			
USBWA	Dick Nemelka	Brigham Young	No second or third teams (10-man first team)			
USBWA	Pat Riley	Kentucky	No second or third teams (10-man first team)			
USBWA	Cazzie Russell	Michigan	No second or third teams (10-man first team)			
USBWA	Dave Schellhase	Purdue	No second or third teams (10-man first team)			
USBWA	Dick Snyder	Davidson	No second or third teams (10-man first team)			
USBWA	Jimmy Walker	Providence	No second or third teams (10-man first team)			
USBWA	Walt Wesley	Kansas	No second or third teams (10-man first team)			
NABC	Dave Bing	Syracuse	John Austin	Boston College	Henry Finkel	Dayton
NABC	Clyde Lee	Vanderbilt	Louie Dampier	Kentucky	Lou Hudson	Minnesota
NABC	Cazzie Russell	Michigan	Matt Guokas	Saint Joseph's	Bob Lewis	North Carolina
NABC	Dave Schellhase	Purdue	Bob Verga	Duke	Jack Marin	Duke
NABC	Jimmy Walker	Providence	Walt Wesley	Kansas	Dick Nemelka	Brigham Young
UPI	Dave Bing	Syracuse	Louie Dampier	Kentucky	John Austin	Boston College
UPI	Clyde Lee	Vanderbilt	Matt Guokas	Saint Joseph's	Henry Finkel	Dayton
UPI	Cazzie Russell	Michigan	Dick Snyder	Davidson	Lou Hudson	Minnesota
UPI	Dave Schellhase	Purdue	Bob Verga	Duke	Jack Marin	Duke
UPI	Jimmy Walker	Providence	Walt Wesley	Kansas	Pat Riley	Kentucky

AP Honorable Mention:

- Cliff Anderson, Saint Joseph's
- John Austin, Boston College
- John Beasley, Texas A&M
- John Block, USC
- Nate Branch, Nebraska
- Jerry Chambers, Utah
- Archie Clark, Minnesota
- Leon Clark, Wyoming
- Jim Coleman, Loyola (Illinois)
- Mel Daniels, New Mexico
- Ollie Darden, Michigan
- Lee DeFore, Auburn
- Sonny Dove, St. John's
- Joe Ellis, San Francisco
- Donnie Freeman, Illinois
- Clem Haskins, Western Kentucky
- Elvin Hayes, Houston
- Lou Hudson, Minnesota
- Edgar Lacy, UCLA
- Bob Leonard, Wake Forest
- Dub Malaise, Texas Tech
- Don May, Dayton
- Bill Melchionni, Villanova
- Dorie Murrey, Detroit Mercy
- Dick Nemelka, Brigham Young
- Loy Petersen, Oregon State
- Don Rolfes, Cincinnati
- Nevil Shed, UTEP
- Mike Silliman, Army
- Wes Unseld, Louisville
- Steve Vacendak, Duke
- Jim Ware, Oklahoma City
- Michael Warren, UCLA
- Stan Washington, Michigan State

== See also ==
- 1965–66 NCAA University Division men's basketball season
