= 1967–68 Chicago Bulls season =

NBA professional basketball team season

- Head coach: Johnny "Red" Kerr
- General manager: Dick Klein
- Owner: Dick Klein
- Arena: Chicago Stadium

Results
- Record: 29–53 (.354)
- Place: Division: 4th (Western)
- Playoff finish: Division semifinals (lost to Lakers 1–4)
- Stats at Basketball Reference

Local media
- Television: WGN-TV (Jack Brickhouse, Vince Lloyd)
- Radio: WGN (Lou Boudreau, Vince Lloyd)

The 1967–68 Chicago Bulls season was the second season of the franchise in the National Basketball Association (NBA). The team had moved to the Chicago Stadium beginning this season.

== Draft picks ==
Note: This is not an extensive list; it only covers the first and second rounds, and any other players drafted by the franchise that played at least one NBA game.

Round	Pick	Player	Position	Nationality	School/Club team
1	3	Clem Haskins	G	United States	Western Kentucky
2	15	Byron Beck	F/C	United States	Denver
4	34	Jim Burns	G	United States	Northwestern

== Roster ==
1967–68 Chicago Bulls roster
Players

Pos.	No.	Player	Height	Weight	DOB	From
F	14	Jim Barnes	6 ft 8 in (2.03 m)	210 lb (95 kg)	1941-04-13	UTEP
F	19	Bob Boozer	6 ft 8 in (2.03 m)	215 lb (98 kg)	1937-04-26	Kansas State
G	6	Jim Burns	6 ft 3 in (1.91 m)	195 lb (88 kg)	1945-09-21	Northwestern
F	16	Barry Clemens	6 ft 6 in (1.98 m)	210 lb (95 kg)	1943-05-01	Ohio Wesleyan
F	15	Keith Erickson	6 ft 5 in (1.96 m)	195 lb (88 kg)	1944-04-19	UCLA
G	11	Clem Haskins	6 ft 3 in (1.91 m)	195 lb (88 kg)	1943-07-11	Western Kentucky
F	18	McCoy McLemore	6 ft 7 in (2.01 m)	230 lb (104 kg)	1942-04-03	Drake
G	5	Flynn Robinson	6 ft 1 in (1.85 m)	185 lb (84 kg)	1941-04-28	Wyoming
G	8	Dave Schellhase	6 ft 3 in (1.91 m)	205 lb (93 kg)	1944-10-14	Purdue
G	4	Jerry Sloan	6 ft 5 in (1.96 m)	195 lb (88 kg)	1942-03-28	Evansville
C	17	Craig Spitzer	7 ft 0 in (2.13 m)	225 lb (102 kg)	1945-12-18	Tulane
C	7	Jim Washington	6 ft 6 in (1.98 m)	210 lb (95 kg)	1943-07-01	Villanova
F	6, 9	Ken Wilburn	6 ft 6 in (1.98 m)	195 lb (88 kg)	1944-06-08	Central State

Coaches
Head coach
- Johnny "Red" Kerr

Legend
- (DP) Unsigned draft pick
- (FA) Free agent
- (S) Suspended
- Injured

Roster
Updated: January 9, 1968

== Regular season ==
After that promising beginning the Bulls fell apart. During the 1967-68 NBA season the club traded Guy Rodgers, the steadiest player on the squad, to the Cincinnati Royals for Flynn Robinson and two future draft choices. Chicago lost its first nine games, slumping to 1–15 before climbing back to respectability. The Bulls went 28–38 the rest of the way but still finished 29–53.

Even that record was better than those of the new expansion teams in Seattle and San Diego, so the Bulls still snuck into the playoffs, where they were drubbed by the Lakers in the division semifinals. Bob Boozer, a 6–8 forward who had the most productive seasons of his 11-year career while playing for Chicago, led the team in scoring with 21.5 points per game, and Jim Washington topped the club in rebounding with 10.1 boards per contest.

When Jerry Colangelo left the Bulls' front office to run the Phoenix Suns expansion franchise, he took Kerr along as coach. Kerr's replacement for the 1968–69 season was Dick Motta, who had won three Big Sky Conference championships at Weber State. Motta was an unlikely choice, but he proved to be a fortuitous one. In the early 1970s he molded Chicago into a tough, defensive-minded squad that was always ready to challenge the opposition, even if it couldn't match up in talent.

Chicago owned the fourth overall pick in the 1968 NBA draft and selected 7-foot, 265-pound center Tom Boerwinkle of Tennessee. Boerwinkle would spend his entire 10-year career with Chicago and wind up as the Bulls' all-time leading rebounder with 5,745 career boards.

=== Season standings ===
Western Division	W	L	PCT	GB	Home	Road	Neutral	Div
x-St. Louis Hawks	56	26	.683	–	25–7	22–13	9–6	31–9
x-Los Angeles Lakers	52	30	.634	4	30–11	18–19	4–0	28–12
x-San Francisco Warriors	43	39	.524	13	27–14	16–23	0–2	24–16
x-Chicago Bulls	29	53	.354	27	11–22	12–24	6–7	11–29
Seattle SuperSonics	23	59	.280	33	10–21	7–24	6–14	15–25
San Diego Rockets	15	67	.183	41	8–33	4–26	3–8	11–29

=== Game log ===
1967–68 game log
#	Date	Opponent	Score	High points	Record
1	October 14	@ Boston	90–105	Jim Washington (24)	0–1
2	October 17	Los Angeles	107–105	Bob Boozer (36)	0–2
3	October 19	San Francisco	116–106	Jerry Sloan (26)	0–3
4	October 20	St. Louis	126–99	Bob Boozer (19)	0–4
5	October 21	@ Cincinnati	107–109	Haskins, Mueller (21)	0–5
6	October 25	@ Detroit	99–107	Bob Boozer (26)	0–6
7	October 27	@ Los Angeles	117–125	Bob Boozer (42)	0–7
8	October 29	@ San Francisco	105–125	Keith Erickson (22)	0–8
9	October 31	@ Seattle	104–114	Barry Clemens (29)	0–9
10	November 2	N Seattle	105–119	Bob Boozer (29)	1–9
11	November 7	St. Louis	111–106	Bob Boozer (25)	1–10
12	November 9	Boston	107–93	Boozer, Sloan (24)	1–11
13	November 12	@ Los Angeles	96–97	Barry Clemens (22)	1–12
14	November 15	@ Los Angeles	115–124	Flynn Robinson (34)	1–13
15	November 16	@ San Diego	91–99	McCoy McLemore (23)	1–14
16	November 17	@ San Francisco	109–111	Bob Boozer (24)	1–15
17	November 18	Detroit	130–132	McCoy McLemore (28)	2–15
18	November 21	@ New York	123–125 (2OT)	McCoy McLemore (32)	2–16
19	November 22	@ Baltimore	105–100	Jerry Sloan (35)	3–16
20	November 23	N New York	96–106	Keith Erickson (33)	4–16
21	November 24	Philadelphia	122–104	Flynn Robinson (17)	4–17
22	November 25	@ Philadelphia	119–114	Bob Boozer (28)	5–17
23	November 28	Seattle	111–108	Flynn Robinson (25)	5–18
24	December 1	New York	100–102	Bob Boozer (25)	6–18
25	December 2	@ Cincinnati	126–110	McCoy McLemore (26)	7–18
26	December 5	N Cincinnati	104–105	Bob Boozer (21)	8–18
27	December 6	@ Detroit	121–135	Bob Boozer (30)	8–19
28	December 7	San Diego	118–108	Bob Boozer (23)	8–20
29	December 8	@ Seattle	115–114	Jim Washington (24)	9–20
30	December 9	@ San Francisco	112–119	Barry Clemens (25)	9–21
31	December 12	@ San Diego	104–118	Keith Erickson (24)	9–22
32	December 13	@ San Francisco	109–104	Jerry Sloan (35)	10–22
33	December 14	@ Los Angeles	106–101	Bob Boozer (26)	11–22
34	December 15	Seattle	122–115	Barry Clemens (25)	11–23
35	December 16	Philadelphia	143–123	Bob Boozer (27)	11–24
36	December 21	Baltimore	116–108	Keith Erickson (34)	11–25
37	December 22	@ Baltimore	112–117	McCoy McLemore (28)	11–26
38	December 26	Los Angeles	104–101	McCoy McLemore (26)	11–27
39	December 29	San Francisco	100–107	Bob Boozer (24)	12–27
40	January 1	Baltimore	103–109	Flynn Robinson (34)	13–27
41	January 2	Boston	84–95	Bob Boozer (21)	14–27
42	January 3	@ Baltimore	113–94	Bob Boozer (24)	15–27
43	January 5	N New York	121–99	Erickson, Washington (23)	15–28
44	January 6	@ Cincinnati	114–109	Bob Boozer (24)	16–28
45	January 9	N St. Louis	121–109	Bob Boozer (23)	16–29
46	January 13	Baltimore	106–110	Bob Boozer (32)	17–29
47	January 14	@ St. Louis	92–99	Flynn Robinson (21)	17–30
48	January 16	San Diego	110–123	Flynn Robinson (35)	18–30
49	January 17	N San Diego	110–104	Keith Erickson (20)	18–31
50	January 20	Philadelphia	135–111	Bob Boozer (27)	18–32
51	January 21	@ St. Louis	90–98	Boozer, Erickson (21)	18–33
52	January 25	New York	126–118	Flynn Robinson (35)	18–34
53	January 30	San Francisco	123–119	Keith Erickson (25)	18–35
54	January 31	@ Boston	109–118	Flynn Robinson (24)	18–36
55	February 1	N New York	112–103	Bob Boozer (28)	18–37
56	February 2	Cincinnati	125–113	Flynn Robinson (34)	18–38
57	February 6	San Francisco	126–124 (OT)	Jerry Sloan (33)	18–39
58	February 8	Detroit	110–131	Jim Washington (22)	19–39
59	February 9	@ Philadelphia	113–118	Bob Boozer (24)	19–40
60	February 10	@ St. Louis	107–108	Flynn Robinson (23)	19–41
61	February 12	N Cincinnati	104–112 (OT)	Boozer, Washington (19)	20–41
62	February 13	San Diego	102–114	Clem Haskins (28)	21–41
63	February 15	N Los Angeles	132–105	Flynn Robinson (32)	21–42
64	February 16	Boston	124–108	McCoy McLemore (20)	21–43
65	February 18	@ St. Louis	113–107	McLemore, Washington (24)	22–43
66	February 20	N Detroit	121–124 (OT)	Bob Boozer (35)	23–43
67	February 21	N Seattle	106–108	Bob Boozer (26)	24–43
68	February 24	@ New York	101–109	Flynn Robinson (25)	24–44
69	February 29	N Los Angeles	117–107	Bob Boozer (26)	24–45
70	March 1	@ Boston	87–94	Boozer, Clemens (17)	24–46
71	March 3	@ Detroit	123–134	McCoy McLemore (23)	24–47
72	March 5	Detroit	121–119	Bob Boozer (30)	24–48
73	March 7	Boston	112–118	Bob Boozer (26)	25–48
74	March 9	St. Louis	115–109	Flynn Robinson (34)	25–49
75	March 11	Cincinnati	98–104	Boozer, Robinson (19)	26–49
76	March 12	N Philadelphia	139–115	Jim Washington (29)	26–50
77	March 13	@ Baltimore	100–96	Clem Haskins (22)	27–50
78	March 15	Seattle	113–101	Flynn Robinson (21)	27–51
79	March 16	Philadelphia	144–122	McCoy McLemore (26)	27–52
80	March 17	@ San Diego	129–121	Jim Barnes (27)	28–52
81	March 19	N Seattle	104–122	Clem Haskins (18)	28–53
82	March 20	@ San Diego	121–112	Flynn Robinson (29)	29–53

== Playoffs ==
1968 playoff game log
Division semifinals: 1–4 (home: 1–1; road: 0–3)

Game	Date	Team	Score	High points	High rebounds	High assists	Location Attendance	Series
1	March 24	@ Los Angeles	L 101–109	Bob Boozer (27)	Jim Washington (11)	Keith Erickson (5)	The Forum; 7,352	0–1
2	March 25	@ Los Angeles	L 106–111	Flynn Robinson (32)	Jim Washington (13)	Bob Boozer (4)	The Forum; 8,158	0–2
3	March 27	Los Angeles	W 104–98	Flynn Robinson (41)	Jim Washington (17)	Flynn Robinson (4)	Chicago Stadium; 3,456	1–2
4	March 29	Los Angeles	L 87–93	Keith Erickson (20)	Jim Washington (19)	Erickson, Sloan (2)	Chicago Stadium; 5,678	1–3
5	March 31	@ Los Angeles	L 99–122	Jim Washington (24)	Jim Washington (15)	three players tied (4)	The Forum; 12,108	1–4

1968 schedule

== Awards and records ==
Bob Boozer, NBA All-Star Game
