= Dennis Hamilton =

American basketball player

Personal information
- Born: May 8, 1944 Huntington Beach, California, U.S.
- Died: June 18, 2012 (aged 68) Chandler, Arizona, U.S.
- Listed height: 6 ft 8 in (2.03 m)
- Listed weight: 210 lb (95 kg)

Career information
- High school: Huntington Beach (Huntington Beach, California)
- College: Arizona State (1963–1966)
- NBA draft: 1966: undrafted
- Position: Power forward
- Number: 52, 12, 4

Career history
- 1967–1968: Los Angeles Lakers
- 1968–1969: Atlanta Hawks
- 1969–1970: Pittsburgh Pipers
- 1970–1971: Kentucky Colonels

Career highlights
- Second-team All-WAC (1966)
- Stats at NBA.com
- Stats at Basketball Reference

Dennis Eugene Hamilton (May 8, 1944 – June 18, 2012) was an American basketball player. He played in the National Basketball Association (NBA) and American Basketball Association (ABA) from 1967 to 1971.

Hamilton, a 6'8" forward from Huntington Beach High School in Huntington Beach, California, played collegiately at the Arizona State University from 1963 to 1966. For his career, he scored 1,079 points (13.6 per game) and shot .813 from the free throw line. He was named second team All-Western Athletic Conference in 1966.

Undrafted after the completion of his college career, Hamilton signed as a free agent with the Los Angeles Lakers for the 1967–68 NBA season. For the season he averaged 2.8 points and 1.6 rebounds per game for a team that made it to the 1968 NBA Finals. Following the season, Hamilton was selected by the Phoenix Suns in the 1968 NBA expansion draft, then traded to the Atlanta Hawks for the 1968–69 NBA season. Hamilton then played two years in the American Basketball Association, for the Pittsburgh Pipers and Kentucky Colonels. For his NBA/ABA career he averaged 4.6 points and 3.1 rebounds per game.

Hamilton died on June 18, 2012.

== Career statistics ==
Legend
GP	Games played	GS	Games started	MPG	Minutes per game
FG%	Field goal percentage	3P%	3-point field goal percentage	FT%	Free throw percentage
RPG	Rebounds per game	APG	Assists per game	SPG	Steals per game
BPG	Blocks per game	PPG	Points per game	**Bold**	Career high

=== NBA/ABA ===
==== Regular season ====
Year	Team	GP	MPG	FG%	3P%	FT%	RPG	APG	PPG
1967–68	L.A. Lakers	44	8.6	.500		**1.000**	1.6	.7	2.8
1968–69	Atlanta	25	5.6	**.552**		.400	1.2	.3	3.0
1969–70	Pittsburgh (ABA)	**72**	**18.5**	.507	.000	.760	**4.7**	**1.0**	**6.3**
1970–71	Kentucky (ABA)	3	3.7	.500	–	**1.000**	.3	.3	1.0
Career (NBA)		69	7.5	.520		.833	1.5	.6	2.9
Career (ABA)		75	17.9	.507	.000	.762	4.5	1.0	6.1
Career (overall)		144	12.9	.511	.000	.773	3.1	.8	4.6

==== Playoffs ====
Year	Team	GP	MPG	FG%	FT%	RPG	APG	PPG
1968	L.A. Lakers	2	5.5	.333	–	1.0	.5	1.0
