= Erwin Mueller =

American basketball player (1944–2018)

Personal information
- Born: March 12, 1944 Livermore, California, U.S.
- Died: June 7, 2018 (aged 74) North Las Vegas, Nevada, U.S.
- Listed height: 6 ft 8 in (2.03 m)
- Listed weight: 230 lb (104 kg)

Career information
- High school: Livermore (Livermore, California)
- College: San Francisco (1963–1966)
- NBA draft: 1966: 2nd round, 20th overall pick
- Drafted by: Chicago Bulls
- Playing career: 1966–1973
- Position: Power forward / center
- Number: 14, 34, 6, 24, 51, 35

Career history
- 1966–1968: Chicago Bulls
- 1968: Los Angeles Lakers
- 1968–1969: Chicago Bulls
- 1969: Seattle SuperSonics
- 1969–1972: Detroit Pistons
- 1972–1973: Virginia Squires
- 1973: Memphis Tams

Career highlights
- NBA All-Rookie First Team (1967); 2× First-team All-WCAC (1965, 1966)

Career NBA and ABA statistics
- Points: 3,287 (7.4 ppg)
- Rebounds: 2,100 (4.7 rpg)
- Assists: 881 (2.0 apg)
- Stats at NBA.com
- Stats at Basketball Reference

This is an article about the basketball player. For the physicist, see Erwin Wilhelm Müller.

Erwin Louis Mueller (March 12, 1944 – June 7, 2018) was an American basketball player. A 6 ft 8 in (2.03 m) power forward/center, he attended the University of San Francisco where he was All–Conference and was selected by the Chicago Bulls in the second round (10th pick overall) of the 1966 NBA draft.

== Early life ==
Mueller was born on March 12, 1944, in Livermore, California. He attended Livermore High School, where he excelled on the basketball team under coach Leon "Lee" Williford. He led the team to two Diablo Valley Athletic League (DVAL) championships and Tournament of Champion (TOC) berths in 1960-61 and 1961-62. As a junior, he was DVAL scoring champion, and was named to the All-TOC team for averaging nearly 20 points a game.

== College basketball ==
Mueller played college basketball at the University of San Francisco (1963—66), at both center and forward. His nickname, "Mr. Inside", came from his defensive prowess in protecting the basket at the rim. He was selected All-Coast, All-Conference and was an All-American. During his senior year, Mueller averaged 18.4 points per game and 11.9 rebounds per game. Over his three years at San Francisco, he averaged 12.1 points per game on a 50.2 field goal percentage, and 8.5 rebounds per game.

As a junior, his 24–5 USF team was in the 1965 NCAA tournament, winning the first game of the Western Regionals before losing to eventual national champion UCLA, 101–93. As a senior, the team participated in the National Invitation Tournament (NIT), and Mueller was named to the All-NIT Team. He was also selected by coaches to the All-Coast Team and was selected to the All-WCAC team that year.

== Professional basketball ==
Mueller was selected by the Chicago Bulls in the second round of the 1966 NBA draft (20th overall). It was the expansion Bulls' first college draft. During his first season, Mueller averaged 26.7 minutes, 12.7 points, and 6.2 rebounds per game with the Bulls. He earned NBA All-Rookie Team honors, along with Dave Bing, Lou Hudson, Jack Marin, and Cazzie Russell.

He was traded midway through his second season to the Los Angeles Lakers for Jim Barnes and a draft choice on January 9, 1968. After playing 39 games for the Lakers in 1968, Mueller would return to the Bulls for the start of the 1968–69 season by way of another trade between the Lakers and the Bulls, exchanging Keith Erickson for Mueller on September 23, 1968. However, his tenure in Chicago would not last through the season. On January 31, 1969, Mueller was traded to the Seattle SuperSonics for a draft choice and cash. He averaged only 7.5 points per game in 1967-68, and 4.8 points per game in 1968-69.

He played all or part of four more years in the NBA, chiefly with the Detroit Pistons. His best season during this time came in 1969-70 with the Pistons, when he averaged 10.1 points and 6.3 rebounds per game in 74 games. In his seven-season (1966–1973) NBA career, he scored 3,248 total points, averaging 7.6 points and 4.8 rebounds per game. He spent part of the 1972–73 and 1973–74 seasons in the rival American Basketball Association as a member of the Virginia Squires and Memphis Tams, playing in only 20 games over those two seasons.

== Post basketball ==
Mueller worked as a draftsman developing irrigation systems after retiring from basketball.

== Death ==
Mueller died on June 7, 2018, in North Las Vegas. He was survived by Karen Mueller, after 40 years of marriage; four children and six grandchildren.

== Career statistics ==
Legend
GP	Games played	GS	Games started	MPG	Minutes per game
FG%	Field goal percentage	3P%	3-point field goal percentage	FT%	Free throw percentage
RPG	Rebounds per game	APG	Assists per game	SPG	Steals per game
BPG	Blocks per game	PPG	Points per game	**Bold**	Career high

=== NBA/ABA ===
==== Regular season ====
Year	Team	GP	MPG	FG%	3P%	FT%	RPG	APG	STL	BLK	PPG
1966–67	Chicago	**80**	26.7	.441		.658	6.2	1.6			**12.7**
1967–68	Chicago	35	23.3	.387		.561	4.8	2.2			6.5
1967–68	L.A. Lakers	39	24.9	**.520**		.592	5.7	2.0			8.3
1968–69	Chicago	52	16.8	.335		.511	3.7	2.4			3.8
1968–69	Seattle	26	18.6	.431		.597	4.0	2.4			7.0
1969–70	Seattle	4	17.3	.406		.444	3.5	1.5			7.5
1969–70	Detroit	74	**30.9**	.467		**.728**	**6.3**	**2.7**			10.3
1970–71	Detroit	52	23.5	.408		.556	4.3	2.2			6.0
1971–72	Detroit	42	14.4	.345		.581	3.5	1.4			4.3
1972–73	Detroit	21	3.8	.290		.714	.7	.3			1.1
1972–73	Virginia (ABA)	17	12.1	.321	—	.300	2.8	1.5			2.2
1973–74	Memphis (ABA)	3	6.6	.000	—	.400	1.0	.7	.0	.0	.7
Career (NBA)		425	22.4	.429		.627	4.8	2.0			7.6
Career (ABA)		20	11.2	.298	—	.333	2.5	1.4	.0	.0	2.0
Career (overall)		445	21.9	.426	—	.623	4.7	2.0	.0	.0	7.4

==== Playoffs ====
Year	Team	GP	MPG	FG%	3P%	FT%	RPG	APG	PPG
1967	Chicago	3	**28.0**	.308		.714	**4.7**	**3.0**	**8.7**
1968	L.A. Lakers	**14**	17.9	**.339**		.357	3.9	1.3	3.2
1973	Virginia (ABA)	5	22.4	.278	**1.000**	**.857**	3.8	**3.0**	3.4
Career (NBA)		17	19.6	.329		.536	4.0	1.6	4.2
Career (overall)		22	20.3	.320	1.000	.600	4.0	1.9	4.0
