= Craig Spitzer =

American basketball player

Personal information
- Born: December 18, 1945 (age 80)
- Listed height: 7 ft 0 in (2.13 m)
- Listed weight: 225 lb (102 kg)

Career information
- College: Tulane (1964–1967)
- NBA draft: 1967: undrafted
- Playing career: 1967–1980
- Position: Center
- Number: 17

Career history
- 1968: Chicago Bulls
- Stats at NBA.com
- Stats at Basketball Reference

Craig W. Spitzer (born December 18, 1945) is an American former professional basketball player.

A 7'0" center from Tulane University, Spitzer spent one season (1967-68) with the Chicago Bulls of the National Basketball Association (NBA). He averaged 1.8 points and 2.4 rebounds.

Following his NBA career, Spitzer played for two seasons in the Continental Basketball Association (CBA) and then professionally in Israel, Sweden, the Netherlands and France. He retired from playing in 1980 and became a basketball agent in France.

== Career statistics ==
Legend
GP	Games played	GS	Games started	MPG	Minutes per game
FG%	Field goal percentage	3P%	3-point field goal percentage	FT%	Free throw percentage
RPG	Rebounds per game	APG	Assists per game	SPG	Steals per game
BPG	Blocks per game	PPG	Points per game	**Bold**	Career high

=== NBA ===
==== Regular season ====
Year	Team	GP	MPG	FG%	FT%	RPG	APG	PPG
1967–68	Chicago	10	4.4	.381	.667	2.4	.0	1.8

==== Playoffs ====
Year	Team	GP	MPG	FG%	FT%	RPG	APG	PPG
1968	Chicago	1	3.0	.000	–	3.0	1.0	.0
