= Lou Hudson =

American basketball player (1944–2014)

Personal information
- Born: July 11, 1944 Greensboro, North Carolina, U.S.
- Died: April 11, 2014 (aged 69) Atlanta, Georgia, U.S.
- Listed height: 6 ft 5 in (1.96 m)
- Listed weight: 210 lb (95 kg)

Career information
- High school: James B. Dudley (Greensboro, North Carolina)
- College: Minnesota (1963–1966)
- NBA draft: 1966: 1st round, 4th overall pick
- Drafted by: St. Louis Hawks
- Playing career: 1966–1979
- Position: Shooting guard / small forward
- Number: 23

Career history
- 1966–1977: St. Louis / Atlanta Hawks
- 1977–1979: Los Angeles Lakers

Career highlights
- 6× NBA All-Star (1969–1974); All-NBA Second Team (1970); NBA All-Rookie First Team (1967); No. 23 retired by Atlanta Hawks; Third-team All-American – NABC, UPI (1966); First-team All-Big Ten (1965); Second-team All-Big Ten (1966); No. 14 retired by Minnesota Golden Gophers

Career NBA statistics
- Points: 17,940 (20.2 ppg)
- Rebounds: 3,926 (4.4 rpg)
- Assists: 2,432 (2.7 apg)
- Stats at NBA.com
- Stats at Basketball Reference
- Basketball Hall of Fame

Louis Clyde Hudson ("Sweet Lou") (July 11, 1944 – April 11, 2014) was an American National Basketball Association (NBA) player, who was an All-American at the University of Minnesota and a six-time NBA All-Star, scoring 17,940 total points in 13 NBA seasons.

== Early life ==
"Sweet" Lou Hudson graduated in 1962 from James B. Dudley High School in Greensboro, North Carolina, where he was a four-sport athlete. Hudson was a quarterback, a first baseman and a sprinter, besides playing basketball.

"Lou epitomized athleticism," said Dudley teammate Charlie Sanders, who went on to a Hall of Fame National Football League career. "Football. Basketball. Baseball. Track. He could do everything, and he could do everything well. He was the one guy who was instrumental in my pursuing athletics. When I saw Lou Hudson play, that's when I made my mind up that I wanted to be like him." Sanders later followed Hudson to the University of Minnesota.

== College career ==
Hudson became part of the first black recruiting class at Minnesota, as he, Archie Clark and Don Yates enrolled at the University of Minnesota in 1964. He had also been recruited by North Carolina and Coach Dean Smith. Hudson had planned to play in college for North Carolina A&T, a historically black college. The University of Minnesota then offered Hudson a scholarship, and the North Carolina A&T coach "told me I should take this opportunity to play in the big time, that I was good enough for that," Hudson told The Charlotte Observer in 2009. "And he was right."

In 1963–1964, Hudson made his varsity debut at Minnesota, making an immediate impact, averaging 18.1 points to lead the team and 8.0 rebounds, playing alongside teammate Archie Clark. Minnesota finished 17–7 under Hall of Fame Coach John Kundla.

As a junior at the University of Minnesota, in 1964–1965, Hudson averaged 24.8 points and 10.7 rebounds. He was named an All-American and First Team All-Big Ten. Minnesota finished 19–5 and were 2nd in the Big Ten Conference behind Michigan.

Hudson, who shot right handed, broke his right hand as a senior in 1965–1966 and missed seven games. He played in 17 games with the injury and led the Golden Gophers to a 14–10 record, averaging 19.8 points and 8.1 rebounds. He did this while shooting left-handed with his right hand in a cast.

Hudson averaged 20.4 points and 8.9 rebounds, shooting 47% in 65 career games at Minnesota, totaling 1329 points and 576 rebounds.

== NBA career ==
=== St Louis / Atlanta Hawks (1966–1977) ===
After starring at the University of Minnesota, Hudson was selected by the St. Louis Hawks with the 4th pick of the 1966 NBA draft, behind Cazzie Russell, New York Knicks, Dave Bing, Detroit Pistons and Clyde Lee, San Francisco Warriors. In a nod to his athleticism, Hudson was drafted by the Dallas Cowboys as a wide receiver with their final pick in the 1966 NFL draft.

At 6'5", Hudson could play as either a guard or a forward, and he had a long and successful NBA career. Hudson was named to the 1967 NBA All-Rookie Team after averaging a team leading 18.4 points, along with 5.4 rebounds and 1.2 assists in his first season with the St. Louis Hawks. He played alongside Naismith Basketball Hall of Fame teammates Lenny Wilkens, Zelmo Beaty, Richie Guerin and Rod Thorn, as well as Bill Bridges, Joe Caldwell and Paul Silas, as the Hawks advanced to the Western Division Finals, where they lost 4–2 to the San Francisco Warriors, despite Hudson averaging 20.7 points in the series. Hudson had earlier averaged 26.3 points in the 3 game playoff series sweep of the Chicago Bulls.

In 1967–1968, Hudson played in only 46 games, due to military duty, averaging 12.5 points.

Hudson returned to form in 1968–1969, averaging 21.9 points, 6.6 rebounds and 2.7 assists for the Hawks, in their first season after moving from St. Louis to Atlanta. Hudson has the distinction of scoring the first-ever basket for the Atlanta Hawks, playing at Alexander Memorial Coliseum in Atlanta. Hudson made his first NBA All-Star Team in 1969. The Hawks finished 48–34 and defeated the San Diego Rockets 4–2 in the playoffs, before falling to the Los Angeles Lakers 4–1 in the Western Division Finals. Hudson averaged 22.8 points in the Rockets series and 21.0 points 5.4 rebounds and 4.4 assists in the Lakers series.

Hudson went on to average at least 24 points per game for five consecutive seasons beginning in 1969–70.

In 1969–1970, Hudson averaged 25.4 points, 4.7 rebounds and 3.5 assists with 53% shooting, making his second NBA All-Star Team. The Hawks finished 48–34, winning the Western Division. The Hawks defeated the Chicago Bulls 4–1 in the Western Division playoffs, before losing 4–0 to the Lakers in the Western Division Finals. Hudson averaged 26.4 points, 4.2 rebounds and 2.2 assists in the Bulls series win. Against the Lakers, with Jerry West, Wilt Chamberlain and Elgin Baylor, Hudson averaged 16.3 points, 4.8 rebounds and 5.5 assists. Hudson scored a career high (and franchise record) 57 points against the Chicago Bulls on November 10, 1969, in a 133–132 Hawks victory.

Hudson was an All-Star, averaging 26.8 points, 5.1 rebounds and 3.4 assists for the Hawks in 1970–1971, while playing in the back court with newly drafted Pete Maravich (23.2 ppg) and alongside Walt Bellamy. The Hawks were defeated by the New York Knicks 4–1 in the Eastern Conference playoffs, despite Hudson averaging 25.4 points, 7.0 rebounds and 3.0 assists in the series.

For the Atlanta Hawks in 1971–1972, Hudson continued his All-Star level play, averaging 24.7 points, 5.0 rebounds and 4.0 points with 50% shooting, making his fourth consecutive All-Star team. The Hawks were defeated by the Boston Celtics in the Eastern conference playoffs 4–2, as Hudson averaged 25.0 pints 5.5 assists and 3.5 assists in the series.

In 1972–1973 Cotton Fitzsimmons replaced longtime Hawks coach Richie Guerin, who had moved up to General Manager. Hudson averaged a career high 27.1 points, along with 6.2 rebounds and 3,2 assists, playing alongside Maravich in the back-court with his averages of 26.1 points 4.4 rebounds and 6.9 assists. Finishing 46–36, Atlanta was again defeated by Boston in the Eastern Conference playoffs 4–2. Hudson was outstanding in the series, averaging 29.7 points, 7.8 rebounds and 2.8 assists. With Maravich scoring 2,063 points, he combined with Hudson's 2,029 points, to become only the second set of teammates in NBA history to each score over 2,000 points in a single season. Elgin Baylor and Jerry West first accomplished the feat for the Los Angeles Lakers in 1964–65.

Hudson averaged 25.4 points, 5.4 rebounds, 3.3 assists and 2.5 steals in 1973–1974, as the Hawks faltered to 37–47 and missed the playoffs. Hudson missed 17 games due to injury and made his sixth consecutive All-Star Team.

In 1974–1975, injuries limited Hudson to 11 games, in which he averaged 22.0 4.3 and 3.6 assists at age 30. Atlanta had traded Maravich and finished 31–51.

In his final two seasons in Atlanta, Hudson averaged 17.0 and 16.7 points, playing a few less minutes per game. Atlanta missed the playoffs both seasons.

=== Los Angeles Lakers (1977–1979) ===
On September 30, 1977, Hudson was traded by the Atlanta Hawks to the Los Angeles Lakers for Ollie Johnson.

Over his final two seasons, with the Lakers, Hudson averaged 11.8 points, 2.1 rebounds and 2.1 assists, playing under Coach Jerry West and alongside Hall of Famers Kareem Abdul-Jabbar, Adrian Dantley and Jamaal Wilkes, as well as Norm Nixon, Ron Boone and a young Michael Cooper. Hudson averaged 13.7 points, 2.3 rebounds and 2.4 assists in 1977–1978, as the Lakers finished 45–37 and lost to Seattle 2–1 in the Western Conference playoffs. In his final season, 1978–1979, Hudson averaged 9.8 points and the Lakers lost to eventual 1979 NBA Champion Seattle 4–1 in the Western Conference Semis, after defeating the Denver Nuggets 2–1 in the previous series.

=== Career achievements ===
Hudson was a six time All-Star, all with the Hawks (who moved to Atlanta in 1968), and he earned the nickname "Sweet Lou" for his smooth and effective jump shot.

Hudson's jersey number has been retired by both the Atlanta Hawks and the University of Minnesota.

Retiring after the 1978–1979 season, Hudson scored 17,940 total points in 13 seasons (1966–1979). He averaged 20.2 points, 4.4 rebounds, 2.7 assists and 1.4 steals per game in 890 games. He shot .489 from the field and .797 from the free throw line. He was the 12th all-time leading scorer in NBA History at the time of his retirement.

Hudson was an even better performer in the NBA playoffs. Hudson averaged 21.3 points, 5.2 rebounds and 2.7 assists in 61 career playoff games.

== Personal life ==
After his NBA career ended in 1979, Hudson sold restaurant equipment in Atlanta and briefly worked as a radio announcer for the Atlanta Hawks.

Hudson appeared in the basketball movie The Fish That Saved Pittsburgh in 1979.

In 1984, Hudson relocated to Park City, Utah, where he became a real estate investor and served on the Park City city council in the early 1990s. Hudson is believed to have been the first African-American elected official in Utah, where his campaign signs had the slogan "Sweet Lou for You."

Hudson created a recreation basketball league where he served as coach for 20 years, before suffering a major stroke on a Park City ski slope in February 2005.

Hudson made public appearances as an "ambassador" for the "Power to End Stroke" organization.

"I enjoyed playing the game," Hudson told The New York Times in 2004. "I was a loyal team person. I went out every night and played to the best of my ability because I enjoyed basketball. The chips fell where they fell, and I don't have a problem with where they fell. Guys that won championships, I tell them, 'You won a championship, but you still weren't as good as I was.' "

Said Dominique Wilkins, who Hudson mentored early in Wilkins' career: "He should be a Hall of Famer, and it's amazing to me he's not. He was one of the best (shooting) guards, and that's a fact. You go back and look at his career and look at the numbers and see what he did and you understand."

Hudson's son, Lou Jr. died suddenly in 1996 at age 18 from a blood clot in his lung after first complaining of soreness in his rib area after a high school basketball game.

In 2014, Hudson died after a stroke, at age 69.

== Honors ==
- Hudson was inducted into the North Carolina Sports Hall of Fame in 1988.
- In 1991, Hudson was inducted into the M Club Hall of Fame at the University of Minnesota.
- Hudson's #14 jersey was retired by the University of Minnesota in 1994.
- Hudson's #23 is retired by the Atlanta Hawks.
- In 2002, Hudson was inducted into the Georgia Sports Hall of Fame.
- In 2003, Hudson was named "Humanitarian of the Year" by the XNBA, the retired NBA player's association.
- Hudson was inducted into the Atlanta Sports Hall of Fame in 2007.
- Hudson was inducted into the Naismith Memorial Basketball Hall of Fame in 2022.

== NBA career statistics ==
Legend
GP	Games played	GS	Games started	MPG	Minutes per game
FG%	Field goal percentage	3P%	3-point field goal percentage	FT%	Free throw percentage
RPG	Rebounds per game	APG	Assists per game	SPG	Steals per game
BPG	Blocks per game	PPG	Points per game	**Bold**	Career high

=== Regular season ===
Year	Team	GP	GS	MPG	FG%	3P%	FT%	RPG	APG	SPG	BPG	PPG
1966–67	St. Louis	80	–	30.6	.467	–	.706	5.4	1.2	–	–	18.4
1967–68	St. Louis	46	–	21.0	.454	–	.732	4.2	1.4	–	–	12.5
1968–69	Atlanta	81	–	35.4	.492	–	.777	**6.6**	2.7	–	–	21.9
1969–70	Atlanta	80	–	38.6	**.531**	–	.824	4.7	3.5	–	–	25.4
1970–71	Atlanta	76	–	**41.0**	.484	–	.759	5.1	3.4	–	–	26.8
1971–72	Atlanta	77	–	39.5	.503	–	.812	5.0	**4.0**	–	–	24.7
1972–73	Atlanta	75	–	40.4	.477	–	.825	6.2	3.4	–	–	**27.1**
1973–74	Atlanta	65	–	39.8	.500	–	.836	5.4	3.3	**2.5**	**0.4**	25.4
1974–75	Atlanta	11	–	34.5	.431	–	.842	4.3	3.6	1.2	0.2	22.0
1975–76	Atlanta	81	–	31.6	.472	–	.814	3.7	2.6	1.5	0.2	17.0
1976–77	Atlanta	58	–	30.1	.456	–	.840	2.2	2.7	1.2	0.3	16.7
1977–78	L.A. Lakers	**82**	–	27.8	.497	–	.774	2.3	2.4	1.1	0.2	13.7
1978–79	L.A. Lakers	78	–	21.6	.517	–	**.887**	1.8	1.8	0.7	0.2	9.8
Career		890	–	33.5	.489	–	.797	4.4	2.7	1.4	0.3	20.2
All-Star		6	3	16.5	.426	–	.933	2.2	1.0	0.0	0.2	11.0

=== Playoffs ===
Year	Team	GP	GS	MPG	FG%	3P%	FT%	RPG	APG	SPG	BPG	PPG
1967	St. Louis	9	–	35.2	.430	–	.721	5.3	1.7	–	–	22.6
1968	St. Louis	6	–	30.2	.444	–	.894	7.2	2.3	–	–	21.7
1969	Atlanta	**11**	–	38.5	.468	–	.769	5.4	2.9	–	–	22.0
1970	Atlanta	9	–	40.0	.417	–	.820	4.4	**3.7**	–	–	21.9
1971	Atlanta	5	–	42.6	.454	–	.744	7.0	3.0	–	–	25.4
1972	Atlanta	6	–	**44.3**	.453	–	.828	5.5	3.5	–	–	25.0
1973	Atlanta	6	–	42.5	.458	–	.897	**7.8**	2.8	–	–	**29.7**
1978	L.A. Lakers	3	–	31.0	.368	–	.875	3.0	3.0	**1.7**	0.0	11.7
1979	L.A. Lakers	6	–	15.0	**.531**	–	**1.000**	0.7	0.2	0.2	0.0	6.3
Career		61	–	36.0	.446	–	.804	5.2	2.7	0.7	0.0	21.3

== See also ==
- List of NBA single-game steals leaders
