= 1967–68 St. Louis Hawks season =

NBA professional basketball team season

- Division champions
- Head coach: Richie Guerin
- Arena: Kiel Auditorium

Results
- Record: 56–26 (.683)
- Place: Division: 1st (Western)
- Playoff finish: West Division Semifinals (Eliminated 2–4)
- Stats at Basketball Reference

Local media
- Television: KPLR-TV
- Radio: KMOX

The 1967–68 St. Louis Hawks season was the 13th and last season in St. Louis for the franchise, before relocating to Atlanta for the following season. The Hawks won the Western Division title with a record of 56–26, before losing to the San Francisco Warriors in the West Semifinal, four games to two.

== Draft picks ==
Round	Pick	Player	Position	Nationality	School/Club team
1	8	Tom Workman		United States	Seattle
3	25	Bob Verga	PG	United States	Duke
4	37	Wes Bialosuknia	G	United States	Connecticut
5	49	Mike Wittman		United States	Miami (FL)
6	61	John Morrison		United States	Canisius
7	73	Carl Fuller		United States	Bethune-Cookman
8	85	Arvesta Kelly		United States	Lincoln University of Missouri
9	96	Ed Biedenbach		United States	North Carolina State
10	107	Rick Falkenbrush		United States	Saint Michael's

== Roster ==
1967–68 St. Louis Hawks roster
Players

Pos.	No.	Player	Height	Weight	DOB	From
C	31	Zelmo Beaty	6 ft 9 in (2.06 m)	225 lb (102 kg)		Prairie View A&M
F/C	32	Bill Bridges	6 ft 6 in (1.98 m)	228 lb (103 kg)		Kansas
G/F	27	Joe Caldwell	6 ft 5 in (1.96 m)	195 lb (88 kg)		Arizona State
F/C	24 & 25	Jim Davis	6 ft 9 in (2.06 m)	225 lb (102 kg)		Colorado
G/F	23	Lou Hudson	6 ft 5 in (1.96 m)	210 lb (95 kg)		Minnesota
G	20	George Lehmann	6 ft 0 in (1.83 m)	180 lb (82 kg)		Campbell (KS)
SF	44	Jay Miller	6 ft 5 in (1.96 m)	205 lb (93 kg)		Notre Dame
G	30	Don Ohl	6 ft 3 in (1.91 m)	190 lb (86 kg)		Illinois
F/C	29	Paul Silas	6 ft 7 in (2.01 m)	220 lb (100 kg)		Creighton
G/F	10	Dick Snyder	6 ft 5 in (1.96 m)	207 lb (94 kg)		West Virginia
F/C	34	Bumper Tormohlen	6 ft 8 in (2.03 m)	230 lb (104 kg)		Tennessee
G	14	Lenny Wilkens	6 ft 1 in (1.85 m)	180 lb (82 kg)		Providence
F/C	12	Tom Workman	6 ft 7 in (2.01 m)	218 lb (99 kg)		Seattle

Coaches
Head coach
- Richie Guerin (Iona)

Legend
- (DP) Unsigned draft pick
- (FA) Free agent
- (S) Suspended
- Injured

== Regular season ==
=== Season standings ===
Western Division	W	L	PCT	GB	Home	Road	Neutral	Div
x-St. Louis Hawks	56	26	.683	–	25–7	22–13	9–6	31–9
x-Los Angeles Lakers	52	30	.634	4	30–11	18–19	4–0	28–12
x-San Francisco Warriors	43	39	.524	13	27–14	16–23	0–2	24–16
x-Chicago Bulls	29	53	.354	27	11–22	12–24	6–7	11–29
Seattle SuperSonics	23	59	.280	33	10–21	7–24	6–14	15–25
San Diego Rockets	15	67	.183	41	8–33	4–26	3–8	11–29

=== Game log ===
1967–68 Game log
#	Date	Opponent	Score	High points	Record
1	October 14	@ San Diego	W 99–98	Zelmo Beaty (39)	1–0
2	October 15	@ San Francisco	W 107–102	Lenny Wilkens (18)	2–0
3	October 17	@ San Diego	W 123–105	Joe Caldwell (29)	3–0
4	October 19	Los Angeles	W 100–95	Dick Snyder (22)	4–0
5	October 20	@ Chicago	W 126–99	Joe Caldwell (26)	5–0
6	October 21	San Francisco	W 115–110	Joe Caldwell (27)	6–0
7	October 24	@ New York	W 135–130 (OT)	Caldwell, Wilkens (30)	7–0
8	October 25	@ Boston	L 104–118	Lenny Wilkens (18)	7–1
9	October 28	Seattle	W 116–109	Zelmo Beaty (36)	8–1
10	October 31	Baltimore	W 114–103	Zelmo Beaty (28)	9–1
11	November 1	@ Cincinnati	W 101–96	Caldwell, Wilkens (24)	10–1
12	November 4	Boston	W 111–104	Dick Snyder (25)	11–1
13	November 7	@ Chicago	111–106	Zelmo Beaty (24)	12–1
14	November 8	Seattle	96–111	Dick Snyder (21)	13–1
15	November 10	@ Detroit	143–140 (OT)	Zelmo Beaty (41)	14–1
16	November 11	San Francisco	93–94	Lenny Wilkens (31)	15–1
17	November 12	San Diego	105–116	Bill Bridges (29)	16–1
18	November 14	vs. Detroit	107–124	Dick Snyder (22)	16–2
19	November 17	vs. Philadelphia	117–125	Lenny Wilkens (26)	16–3
20	November 18	Los Angeles	127–107	Zelmo Beaty (26)	16–4
21	November 22	Philadelphia	113–115	Joe Caldwell (28)	17–4
22	November 25	San Diego	109–110	Zelmo Beaty (22)	18–4
23	November 26	@ Los Angeles	105–109	Lenny Wilkens (21)	18–5
24	November 28	@ Los Angeles	117–134	Bill Bridges (23)	18–6
25	November 30	@ San Diego	129–87	Lenny Wilkens (34)	19–6
26	December 1	@ San Francisco	101–124	Joe Caldwell (31)	19–7
27	December 3	@ Seattle	123–109	Zelmo Beaty (42)	20–7
28	December 8	Cincinnati	95–101	Bill Bridges (23)	21–7
29	December 10	Baltimore	112–114 (OT)	Paul Silas (25)	22–7
30	December 12	@ New York	145–142 (2OT)	Lenny Wilkens (33)	23–7
31	December 15	@ Philadelphia	98–107	Lenny Wilkens (29)	23–8
32	December 16	San Francisco	110–117	Paul Silas (20)	24–8
33	December 17	vs. San Francisco	97–79	Lenny Wilkens (22)	25–8
34	December 19	@ Baltimore	98–117	Zelmo Beaty (24)	25–9
35	December 26	@ Detroit	110–127	Bill Bridges (37)	25–10
36	December 27	Boston	113–116	Beaty, Bridges (26)	26–10
37	December 29	vs. Detroit	122–111	Beaty, Wilkens (23)	27–10
38	December 30	Los Angeles	106–104	Joe Caldwell (31)	27–11
39	January 1	@ Seattle	115–94	Lenny Wilkens (28)	28–11
40	January 3	@ San Diego	124–126 (2OT)	Zelmo Beaty (25)	28–12
41	January 4	@ San Francisco	106–98	Caldwell, Wilkens (24)	29–12
42	January 6	Philadelphia	107–96	Zelmo Beaty (27)	29–13
43	January 9	vs. Chicago	121–109	Lenny Wilkens (30)	30–13
44	January 10	@ Philadelphia	134–122	Silas, Wilkens (28)	31–13
45	January 11	@ Baltimore	108–101	Zelmo Beaty (30)	32–13
46	January 12	San Diego	89–111	Lenny Wilkens (29)	33–13
47	January 14	Chicago	92–99	Joe Caldwell (26)	34–13
48	January 17	@ Boston	102–114	Lenny Wilkens (32)	34–14
49	January 18	vs. Baltimore	119–116	Zelmo Beaty (35)	35–14
50	January 20	Seattle	115–120	Lenny Wilkens (39)	36–14
51	January 21	Chicago	90–98	Zelmo Beaty (32)	37–14
52	January 25	vs. Boston	105–93	Zelmo Beaty (42)	38–14
53	January 26	New York	94–103	Zelmo Beaty (25)	39–14
54	January 27	@ Cincinnati	120–111	Zelmo Beaty (30)	40–14
55	January 28	vs. Los Angeles	113–128	Lou Hudson (23)	40–15
56	January 31	@ Los Angeles	102–110	Zelmo Beaty (28)	40–16
57	February 1	@ Seattle	113–110	Lenny Wilkens (22)	41–16
58	February 3	@ Cincinnati	125–111	Zelmo Beaty (33)	42–16
59	February 4	Cincinnati	100–106	Lenny Wilkens (20)	43–16
60	February 6	@ New York	100–121	Lenny Wilkens (25)	43–17
61	February 7	@ Boston	101–102	Lenny Wilkens (26)	43–18
62	February 9	New York	111–121	Bill Bridges (32)	44–18
63	February 10	Chicago	107–108	Paul Silas (22)	45–18
64	February 11	vs. Philadelphia	93–119	Joe Caldwell (22)	45–19
65	February 13	vs. Cincinnati	123–111	Lou Hudson (28)	46–19
66	February 17	Boston	113–99	Don Ohl (19)	46–20
67	February 18	Chicago	113–107	Lenny Wilkens (29)	46–21
68	February 20	vs. Baltimore	115–127	Joe Caldwell (26)	46–22
69	February 22	vs. Detroit	151–128	Lenny Wilkens (30)	47–22
70	February 23	Baltimore	110–118	Zelmo Beaty (31)	48–22
71	February 25	Philadelphia	126–119	Joe Caldwell (24)	48–23
72	February 27	@ New York	108–102	Beaty, Wilkens (26)	49–23
73	February 29	vs. New York	105–102 (OT)	Bill Bridges (22)	50–23
74	March 1	@ Detroit	121–131	Zelmo Beaty (26)	50–24
75	March 3	San Diego	104–106	Don Ohl (27)	51–24
76	March 5	@ San Francisco	134–117	Don Ohl (28)	52–24
77	March 6	@ Los Angeles	112–96	Zelmo Beaty (25)	53–24
78	March 7	vs. Seattle	150–133	Lenny Wilkens (33)	54–24
79	March 9	@ Chicago	115–109	Lenny Wilkens (32)	55–24
80	March 10	Detroit	133–121	Lou Hudson (24)	55–25
81	March 14	vs. Cincinnati	96–102	Zelmo Beaty (25)	55–26
82	March 16	Seattle	106–124	Zelmo Beaty (24)	56–26

== Player stats ==
Note: GP= Games played; MIN = Minutes; FG = Field goals; REB= Rebounds; AST= Assists; PTS = Points; AVG = Average

=== Season ===
Player	GP	MIN	FG	REB	AST	PTS
Zelmo Beaty	82	3068	639	959	174	1733
Lenny Wilkens	82	3169	546	438	679	1638
Joe Caldwell	79	2641	564	338	240	1293
Bill Bridges	82	3197	466	1102	253	1279
Paul Silas	82	2652	399	958	162	1097
Dick Snyder	75	1622	257	194	164	643
Bumper Tormohlen	77	714	98	226	68	229

== Playoffs ==
1968 playoff game log
Division Semifinals: 2–4 (home: 2–1; road: 0–3)

Game	Date	Team	Score	High points	High rebounds	High assists	Location Attendance	Series
1	March 22	San Francisco	L 106–111	Don Ohl (26)	Paul Silas (15)	Lenny Wilkens (9)	Kiel Auditorium; 5,018	0–1
2	March 23	San Francisco	W 111–103	Zelmo Beaty (46)	Zelmo Beaty (22)	Lenny Wilkens (11)	Kiel Auditorium; 5,810	1–1
3	March 26	@ San Francisco	L 109–124	three players tied (21)	Zelmo Beaty (16)	Lenny Wilkens (5)	Cow Palace; 5,136	1–2
4	March 29	@ San Francisco	L 107–108	Zelmo Beaty (21)	Bill Bridges (14)	Lenny Wilkens (6)	Oakland–Alameda County Coliseum Arena; 12,325	1–3
5	March 31	San Francisco	W 129–103	Bill Bridges (28)	Lou Hudson (14)	Lenny Wilkens (10)	Kiel Auditorium; 4,118	2–3
6	April 2	@ San Francisco	L 106–111	Lou Hudson (35)	Paul Silas (14)	Lenny Wilkens (6)	Cow Palace; 12,905	2–4

1968 schedule

== Awards and records ==
- Richie Guerin, NBA Coach of the Year Award
- Lou Hudson, NBA All-Rookie Team 1st Team
