= Mel Counts =

American basketball player (born 1941)

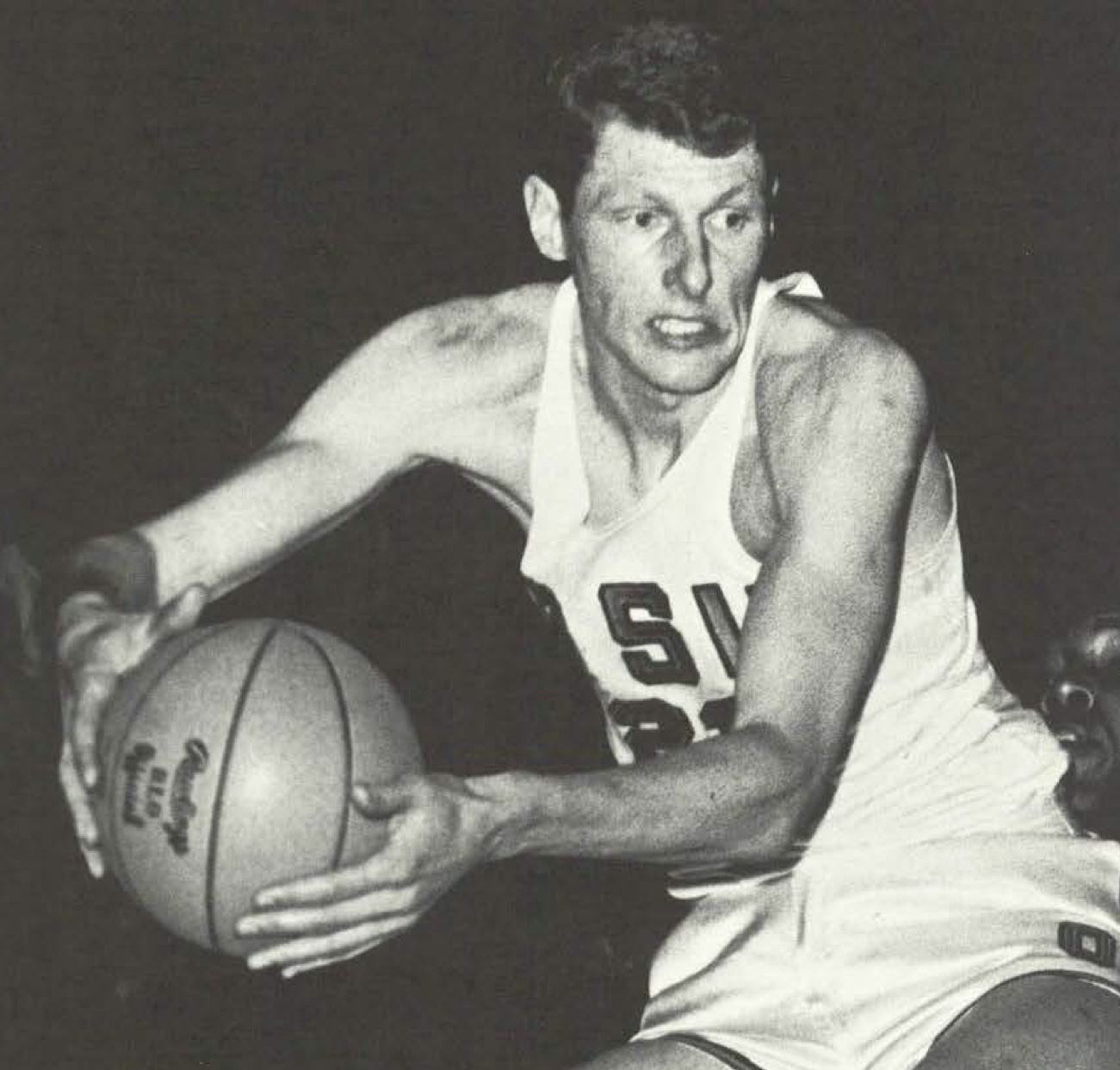
- Counts at Oregon State

Personal information
- Born: October 16, 1941 (age 85) Coos Bay, Oregon, U.S.
- Listed height: 7 ft 0 in (2.13 m)
- Listed weight: 230 lb (104 kg)

Career information
- High school: Marshfield (Coos Bay, Oregon)
- College: Oregon State (1961–1964)
- NBA draft: 1964: 1st round, 7th overall pick
- Drafted by: Boston Celtics
- Playing career: 1964–1976
- Position: Center / power forward
- Number: 11, 31

Career history
- 1964–1966: Boston Celtics
- 1966–1967: Baltimore Bullets
- 1967–1970: Los Angeles Lakers
- 1970–1972: Phoenix Suns
- 1972: Philadelphia 76ers
- 1972–1974: Los Angeles Lakers
- 1974–1976: New Orleans Jazz

Career highlights
- 2× NBA champion (1965, 1966); Consensus second-team All-American (1964); No. 21 retired by Oregon State Beavers

Career statistics
- Points: 6,516 (8.3 ppg)
- Rebounds: 4,756 (6.0 rpg)
- Assists: 1,100 (1.4 apg)
- Stats at NBA.com
- Stats at Basketball Reference
Medals
Men's basketball
Representing the United States
Olympic Games
Gold medal – first place	1964 Tokyo	Team competition

Mel Grant Counts (born October 16, 1941) is an American former basketball player who played in the National Basketball Association (NBA) from 1964 to 1976. He was on the United States Olympic basketball team that won the gold at the 1964 Summer Olympics. He played college basketball for the Oregon State Beavers and was selected by the Boston Celtics in the 1964 NBA draft. The Celtics won the NBA Championship in 1965 and 1966 with Counts on the team as Bill Russell's backup, but he was traded for the 1967 season to the Baltimore Bullets. Halfway through that season he was traded to the Los Angeles Lakers, who made it to the playoffs that year.

Over the next three seasons Counts' Lakers made it to the NBA Finals, where they would play in and ultimately lose three years in a row. In the 1969 NBA Finals, in game 7, starting Laker center Wilt Chamberlain, who had never fouled out of a game, picked up his 5th foul with 6 minutes to play. A minute later, Wilt came off the floor limping and was replaced by Counts with the Lakers trailing the Celtics by nine points. The Lakers cut the deficit to one point on a shot by Counts, with coach Butch van Breda Kolff refusing to reinsert Chamberlain into the game in the final minutes, even though Wilt said his knee felt good enough to play. The Lakers lost the game, 108–106, and the series, 4–3. Counts played one more season with the Lakers before being traded to the Phoenix Suns with the Lakers gaining the return of Gail Goodrich (he started with the Lakers but went to Phoenix in the 1967 expansion draft). After several more stops around the league, including a return to the Lakers in 1973, Counts ended his career with the New Orleans Jazz in 1976.

As of 2006, he was working as a real estate agent in Salem, Oregon. His son Brent played college basketball at the University of the Pacific, his son Brian played at Western Oregon University and his son Chris played at Sheridan Junior College and South Dakota State. His grandsons Brent Jr. played at St. Martin's University, Patrick at Chemeketa Community College and California Maritime Academy, Kyle at St. Thomas - Minnesota, and Jack at Blanchet Catholic High School in Salem, Oregon. Mixed martial artist Chael Sonnen is his nephew.

== Career statistics ==
Legend
GP	Games played	GS	Games started	MPG	Minutes per game
FG%	Field goal percentage	3P%	3-point field goal percentage	FT%	Free throw percentage
RPG	Rebounds per game	APG	Assists per game	SPG	Steals per game
BPG	Blocks per game	PPG	Points per game	**Bold**	Career high
†	Won an NBA championship	*	Led the league

=== NBA ===
==== Regular season ====
Year	Team	GP	GS	MPG	FG%	FT%	RPG	APG	SPG	BPG	PPG
1964–65†	Boston	54	–	10.6	.368	.784	4.9	.4	–	–	4.8
1965–66†	Boston	67	–	15.2	.403	**.828**	6.4	.7	–	–	8.4
1966–67	Baltimore	25	–	13.7	.389	.725	6.2	1.2	–	–	6.4
1966–67	L.A. Lakers	31	–	16.7	.444	.741	6.1	.7	–	–	8.5
1967–68	L.A. Lakers	**82**	–	21.2	**.475**	.748	**8.9**	1.7	–	–	11.7
1968–69	L.A. Lakers	77	–	24.2	.450	.805	7.8	1.4	–	–	12.4
1969–70	L.A. Lakers	81	–	**27.1**	.427	.776	8.4	2.0	–	–	**12.6**
1970–71	Phoenix	80	–	20.9	.457	.753	6.3	1.7	–	–	11.0
1971–72	Phoenix	76	–	11.9	.427	.721	3.4	1.3	–	–	5.2
1972–73	Philadelphia	7	0	6.7	.313	–	2.3	.4	–	–	1.4
1972–73	L.A. Lakers	59	–	10.4	.457	.672	4.0	1.1	–	–	5.0
1973–74	L.A. Lakers	45	–	11.1	.365	.727	3.2	1.2	.4	.5	3.2
1974–75	New Orleans	75	–	18.9	.438	.761	5.9	**2.4**	**.7**	**.6**	6.9
1975–76	New Orleans	30	–	10.6	.407	.762	3.3	1.3	.5	.3	3.0
Career		789	0	17.4	.435	.764	6.0	1.4	.6	.5	8.3

==== Playoffs ====
Year	Team	GP	MPG	FG%	FT%	RPG	APG	SPG	BPG	PPG
1965†	Boston	4	7.5	.267	**1.000**	2.8	.3			2.3
1966†	Boston	10	8.2	.359	.882	4.0	.3			4.3
1967	L.A. Lakers	3	9.7	.263	**1.000**	2.7	.0			4.7
1968	L.A. Lakers	15	20.4	**.535**	.677	**8.9**	**1.6**			8.6
1969	L.A. Lakers	**18***	**24.6**	.385	.761	7.9	1.4			**11.2**
1970	L.A. Lakers	14	15.1	.420	.846	5.3	1.1			6.1
1973	L.A. Lakers	17*	19.2	.459	.780	6.1	**1.6**			9.1
1974	L.A. Lakers	4	8.5	.500	–	1.5	.5	.5	.5	3.0
Career		85	17.2	.426	.775	6.1	1.2	.5	.5	7.6
