= 1967–68 San Francisco Warriors season =

NBA professional basketball team season

- Head coach: Bill Sharman
- Arena: Cow Palace

Results
- Record: 43–39 (.524)
- Place: Division: 3rd (Western)
- Playoff finish: West Division Finals (Lost to Lakers 0–4)
- Stats at Basketball Reference

Local media
- Television: KRON-TV
- Radio: KSFO

The 1967–68 San Francisco Warriors season was the Warriors' 22nd season in the NBA and 6th in the San Francisco Bay Area. The Warriors entered the season hoping to improve upon their previous season output of 44–37. They failed to do so, finishing the season with a 43–39 record, but they still made the playoffs. They defeated the St. Louis Hawks in the West Division semifinals, but were swept by the Los Angeles Lakers in the West Division Finals.

== Roster ==
1967–68 San Francisco Warriors roster
Players

Pos.	No.	Player	Height	Weight	DOB	From
G	16	Al Attles	6 ft 0 in (1.83 m)	175 lb (79 kg)		North Carolina A&T
F	31	Joe Ellis	6 ft 6 in (1.98 m)	175 lb (79 kg)		San Francisco
F	44	Fred Hetzel	6 ft 8 in (2.03 m)	220 lb (100 kg)		Davidson
G	21	Jim King	6 ft 2 in (1.88 m)	175 lb (79 kg)		Tulsa
F	35	Rudy LaRusso	6 ft 7 in (2.01 m)	220 lb (100 kg)		Dartmouth
F	47	Dave Lattin	6 ft 6 in (1.98 m)	225 lb (102 kg)		UTEP
F/C	43	Clyde Lee	6 ft 10 in (2.08 m)	205 lb (93 kg)		Vanderbilt
G/F	9	George Lee	6 ft 4 in (1.93 m)	200 lb (91 kg)		Michigan
G	15	Bobby Lewis	6 ft 3 in (1.91 m)	175 lb (79 kg)		North Carolina
G	23	Jeff Mullins	6 ft 4 in (1.93 m)	190 lb (86 kg)		Duke
F/C	42	Nate Thurmond	6 ft 11 in (2.11 m)	225 lb (102 kg)		Bowling Green
F	22	Bill Turner	6 ft 7 in (2.01 m)	220 lb (100 kg)		Akron
G	11	Bob Warlick	6 ft 5 in (1.96 m)	200 lb (91 kg)		Pepperdine

Coaches
Head coach
- Bill Sharman (USC)
Assistant(s)
- George Lee (Michigan)

Legend
- (DP) Unsigned draft pick
- (FA) Free agent
- (S) Suspended
- Injured

== Regular season ==
=== Season standings ===
Western Division	W	L	PCT	GB	Home	Road	Neutral	Div
x-St. Louis Hawks	56	26	.683	–	25–7	22–13	9–6	31–9
x-Los Angeles Lakers	52	30	.634	4	30–11	18–19	4–0	28–12
x-San Francisco Warriors	43	39	.524	13	27–14	16–23	0–2	24–16
x-Chicago Bulls	29	53	.354	27	11–22	12–24	6–7	11–29
Seattle SuperSonics	23	59	.280	33	10–21	7–24	6–14	15–25
San Diego Rockets	15	67	.183	41	8–33	4–26	3–8	11–29

x – clinched playoff spot

=== Game log ===
1967–68 Game log
#	Date	Opponent	Score	High points	Record
1	October 13	Seattle	116–144	Fred Hetzel (24)	1–0
2	October 15	St. Louis	107–102	Nate Thurmond (21)	1–1
3	October 17	@ New York	122–124	Hetzel, Mullins (22)	1–2
4	October 18	@ Cincinnati	118–122	Jim King (35)	1–3
5	October 19	@ Chicago	116–106	Fred Hetzel (29)	2–3
6	October 21	@ St. Louis	110–115	Jim King (22)	2–4
7	October 22	San Diego	126–137	Nate Thurmond (37)	3–4
8	October 24	Cincinnati	106–116	Jim King (37)	4–4
9	October 27	Baltimore	111–124	Nate Thurmond (25)	5–4
10	October 29	Chicago	105–125	Jim King (26)	6–4
11	October 31	New York	103–108	Nate Thurmond (26)	7–4
12	November 1	@ Detroit	137–132	Jim King (32)	8–4
13	November 4	@ Philadelphia	110–117	Jim King (23)	8–5
14	November 7	Seattle	112–126	Fred Hetzel (25)	9–5
15	November 10	Philadelphia	104–123	Jeff Mullins (22)	10–5
16	November 11	@ St. Louis	93–94	Nate Thurmond (24)	10–6
17	November 14	@ Baltimore	129–123	Nate Thurmond (26)	11–6
18	November 15	@ Boston	110–113	Rudy LaRusso (30)	11–7
19	November 17	Chicago	109–111	Nate Thurmond (28)	12–7
20	November 18	@ San Diego	142–124	Rudy LaRusso (29)	13–7
21	November 21	Detroit	98–124	Fred Hetzel (23)	14–7
22	November 24	Los Angeles	121–122 (OT)	Fred Hetzel (29)	15–7
23	November 25	@ Los Angeles	131–112	Jim King (30)	16–7
24	November 28	@ Baltimore	117–110	Nate Thurmond (28)	17–7
25	November 29	@ Philadelphia	113–95	Jeff Mullins (22)	18–7
26	December 1	St. Louis	101–124	Nate Thurmond (33)	19–7
27	December 2	@ San Diego	103–127	Hetzel, LaRusso (22)	19–8
28	December 5	Seattle	121–133	Jeff Mullins (29)	20–8
29	December 8	San Diego	137–107	LaRusso, Mullins (16)	20–9
30	December 9	Chicago	112–119	Hetzel, Mullins (27)	21–9
31	December 13	Chicago	109–104	Fred Hetzel (26)	21–10
32	December 15	@ Baltimore	110–97	Rudy LaRusso (26)	22–10
33	December 16	@ St. Louis	110–117	Jeff Mullins (23)	22–11
34	December 17	N St. Louis	97–79	Nate Thurmond (16)	22–12
35	December 20	Detroit	109–113	Jeff Mullins (28)	23–12
36	December 22	San Diego	97–103	Rudy LaRusso (26)	24–12
37	December 23	Seattle	124–131	Jeff Mullins (26)	25–12
38	December 24	@ Seattle	127–113	Jeff Mullins (31)	26–12
39	December 26	@ Boston	117–104	Jeff Mullins (32)	27–12
40	December 28	N Cincinnati	122–126	Rudy LaRusso (37)	27–13
41	December 29	@ Chicago	100–107	Nate Thurmond (26)	27–14
42	December 31	@ Seattle	126–124	Nate Thurmond (34)	28–14
43	January 2	Los Angeles	118–119	Fred Hetzel (27)	29–14
44	January 4	St. Louis	106–98	Jeff Mullins (31)	29–15
45	January 6	Boston	101–107	Rudy LaRusso (32)	30–15
46	January 9	Detroit	118–102	Rudy LaRusso (28)	30–16
47	January 12	New York	117–127	Rudy LaRusso (26)	31–16
48	January 15	@ Boston	102–111	Rudy LaRusso (27)	31–17
49	January 16	@ Cincinnati	121–148	Fred Hetzel (27)	31–18
50	January 17	@ Detroit	109–117	Nate Thurmond (32)	31–19
51	January 19	Philadelphia	120–131	Jim King (26)	32–19
52	January 20	@ Los Angeles	122–151	Fred Hetzel (36)	32–20
53	January 26	Baltimore	125–110	Rudy LaRusso (27)	32–21
54	January 28	@ New York	130–133	Rudy LaRusso (31)	32–22
55	January 30	@ Chicago	123–119	LaRusso, Mullins (30)	33–22
56	February 1	@ San Diego	128–114	Rudy LaRusso (40)	34–22
57	February 2	San Diego	121–127	Rudy LaRusso (29)	35–22
58	February 4	@ Philadelphia	117–141	Rudy LaRusso (25)	35–23
59	February 6	@ Chicago	126–124 (OT)	Fred Hetzel (39)	36–23
60	February 8	Cincinnati	109–126	King, Mullins (27)	37–23
61	February 9	@ Los Angeles	104–122	Fred Hetzel (29)	37–24
62	February 11	@ Seattle	118–146	Clyde Lee (23)	37–25
63	February 13	Philadelphia	112–105	Fred Hetzel (27)	37–26
64	February 15	@ San Diego	134–114	Fred Hetzel (33)	38–26
65	February 16	Los Angeles	116–118	Hetzel, LaRusso (32)	39–26
66	February 18	@ Detroit	104–123	Fred Hetzel (22)	39–27
67	February 20	@ New York	112–115 (OT)	Jeff Mullins (25)	39–28
68	February 21	@ Baltimore	117–126	Jeff Mullins (29)	39–29
69	February 23	Boston	122–127	Clyde Lee (33)	40–29
70	February 24	Cincinnati	114–127	Jeff Mullins (27)	41–29
71	February 27	@ Philadelphia	107–127	Fred Hetzel (30)	41–30
72	February 28	@ Boston	110–135	Jeff Mullins (26)	41–31
73	March 1	Cincinnati	122–101	Rudy LaRusso (20)	41–32
74	March 2	Baltimore	109–117	Rudy LaRusso (30)	42–32
75	March 5	St. Louis	134–117	Rudy LaRusso (29)	42–33
76	March 9	Los Angeles	137–132 (OT)	Rudy LaRusso (34)	42–34
77	March 10	@ Seattle	118–112	Rudy LaRusso (25)	43–34
78	March 12	Boston	124–121 (OT)	Jeff Mullins (28)	43–35
79	March 13	@ Los Angeles	106–142	Rudy LaRusso (19)	43–36
80	March 15	Detroit	122–118	Jeff Mullins (29)	43–37
81	March 17	New York	130–104	Rudy LaRusso (28)	43–38
82	March 18	New York	123–118	Rudy LaRusso (29)	43–39

== Playoffs ==
1968 playoff game log
Division Semifinals: 4–2 (home: 3–0; road: 1–2)

Game	Date	Team	Score	High points	High rebounds	High assists	Location Attendance	Series
1	March 22	@ St. Louis	W 111–106	Jeff Mullins (29)	Rudy LaRusso (17)	Al Attles (7)	Kiel Auditorium; 5,018	1–0
2	March 23	@ St. Louis	L 103–111	Jeff Mullins (33)	Clyde Lee (10)	Al Attles (7)	Kiel Auditorium; 5,810	1–1
3	March 26	St. Louis	W 124–109	Jeff Mullins (33)	Clyde Lee (22)	Al Attles (7)	Cow Palace; 5,136	2–1
4	March 29	St. Louis	W 108–107	Jeff Mullins (35)	Clyde Lee (12)	Al Attles (12)	Oakland–Alameda County Coliseum Arena; 12,325	3–1
5	March 31	@ St. Louis	L 103–129	Bob Warlick (21)	Fred Hetzel (9)	Jim King (6)	Kiel Auditorium; 4,118	3–2
6	April 2	St. Louis	W 111–106	Rudy LaRusso (30)	Rudy LaRusso (13)	Al Attles (9)	Cow Palace; 12,905	4–2

Division Finals: 0–4 (home: 0–2; road: 0–2)

Game	Date	Team	Score	High points	High rebounds	High assists	Location Attendance	Series
1	April 5	@ Los Angeles	L 105–133	Jeff Mullins (29)	Clyde Lee (18)	Jeff Mullins (5)	The Forum; 10,319	0–1
2	April 10	@ Los Angeles	L 112–115	Fred Hetzel (36)	Rudy LaRusso (15)	Al Attles (9)	The Forum; 11,270	0–2
3	April 11	Los Angeles	L 124–128	Fred Hetzel (27)	Rudy LaRusso (13)	Jeff Mullins (7)	Cow Palace; 9,232	0–3
4	April 13	Los Angeles	L 100–106	Fred Hetzel (27)	Clyde Lee (17)	Jeff Mullins (6)	Cow Palace; 9,623	0–4

1968 schedule

== Awards and records ==
- Nate Thurmond, NBA All-Star Game
