= Tom Van Arsdale =

American basketball player (born 1943)

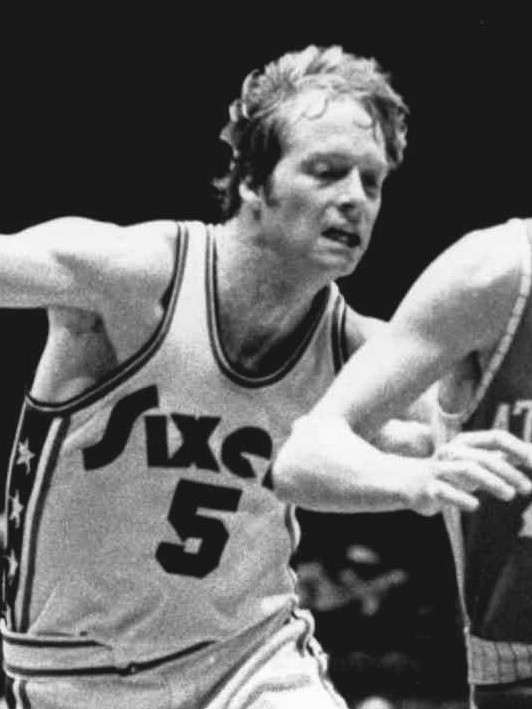
- Van Arsdale with the Philadelphia 76ers in 1974

Personal information
- Born: February 22, 1943 (age 83) Indianapolis, Indiana, U.S.
- Listed height: 6 ft 5 in (1.96 m)
- Listed weight: 202 lb (92 kg)

Career information
- High school: Emmerich Manual (Indianapolis, Indiana)
- College: Indiana (1962–1965)
- NBA draft: 1965: 2nd round, 11th overall pick
- Drafted by: Detroit Pistons
- Playing career: 1965–1977
- Position: Shooting guard / small forward
- Number: 5, 17, 4

Career history
- 1965–1968: Detroit Pistons
- 1968–1973: Cincinnati Royals / Kansas City-Omaha Kings
- 1973–1974: Philadelphia 76ers
- 1974–1976: Atlanta Hawks
- 1976–1977: Phoenix Suns

Career highlights
- 3× NBA All-Star (1970–1972); NBA All-Rookie First Team (1966); Third-team Parade All-American (1961); Co-Indiana Mr. Basketball (1961)

Career NBA statistics
- Points: 14,232 (15.3 ppg)
- Rebounds: 3,942 (4.2 rpg)
- Assists: 2,085 (2.2 apg)
- Stats at NBA.com
- Stats at Basketball Reference

Thomas Arthur Van Arsdale (born February 22, 1943) is an American former professional basketball player. The 6 ft 5 in (1.96 m) guard and small forward played 12 seasons in the National Basketball Association (NBA) with the Detroit Pistons, Cincinnati Royals/Kansas City–Omaha Kings, Philadelphia 76ers, Atlanta Hawks, and Phoenix Suns. In 1966, he was named to the NBA All-Rookie Team. Van Arsdale was selected to play in the NBA All-Star Game three consecutive seasons (1970 to 1972) while with the Royals. He and his identical twin brother Dick Van Arsdale became the first brothers to play in the same NBA All-Star Game. Van Arsdale had six seasons where his scoring average ranged from 18.4 to 22.9 points per game.

A graduate of Emmerich Manual High School in Indianapolis, Van Arsdale played collegiately at Indiana University in the Big Ten Conference under longtime head coach Branch McCracken. Van Arsdale and his brother were jointly named Indiana Mr. Basketball in 1961 during their senior year in high school. He was a first-team Academic All-American in 1965 at Indiana, and second-team All-Big Ten Conference as a junior and senior.

== Early life ==
Van Arsdale was born on February 22, 1943, in Indianapolis, along with his identical twin brother Dick Van Arsdale, to Raymond and Hilda (Thomas) Van Arsdale. The family lived in Greenwood, Indiana. The brothers attended Emmerich Manual High School (Indianapolis Manual) in Indianapolis, where their father Raymond taught mathematics and coached the track team, and their mother Hilda worked in the school's office. Academically, as graduating seniors in 1961, Dick was ranked first and Tom third in a class of 412 students. The brothers were members of the basketball, football, baseball, and track and field teams at Indianapolis Manual. Van Arsdale focused on basketball and track, participating in the low hurdles, high jump, and shot put throw.

In 1961, the brothers were jointly awarded the Indiana Mr. Basketball award. They were also awarded the Arthur L. Trester Award for Mental Attitude in March 1961. This was the first time that Indiana's Mr. Basketball award, and the Trester Award (established in 1917), had been shared. The brothers were the unanimous choice of the Indiana High School Athletic Association's board for the Trester Award.

As a senior, Van Arsdale set a school record at the time by scoring 37 points in a single game. The brothers were both named to the Indiana All-Star basketball team that played against a team of Kentucky high school all-stars twice as part of an annual interstate competition. In March 1961, the Van Arsdales led No. 3 ranked Indianapolis Manual to the state championship game, having won their previous 21 games. Manual lost 68–66 to Kokomo High School in overtime; with Van Arsdale scoring 17 points and brother Dick leading all scorers with 26 points. The Van Arsdales received the Trester Award at that time.

As adolescents, Van Arsdale and his brother idolized future Naismith Basketball Hall of Fame guard Oscar Robertson when Robertson was an Indianapolis high school basketball player; and Robertson remained their favorite athlete. Robertson had played for Crispus Attucks High School in Indianapolis, where he won Indiana high school championships in 1955 and 1956 and was Indiana's Mr. Basketball in 1956. Van Arsdale later became Robertson's NBA teammate and close friend.

== College career ==
Kentucky head coach Adolph Rupp tried to get the brothers to attend Kentucky, and UCLA head coach John Wooden recruited them, but they chose Indiana University, playing on the school's basketball team from 1962 to 1965 under head coach Branch McCracken. The Van Arsdales had avidly followed Indiana Hoosier basketball as children, and saw coach McCracken lead Indiana to the 1953 NCAA championship when they were 10-years old. Van Arsdale later said, "'We didn’t have to be recruited . . . We knew we were going to Indiana'".

At 6 ft 5 in (1.96 m), Van Arsdale and his brother played small forward at Indiana, and were praised by Michigan Wolverines head coach Dave Strack in 1964, "'the twins are as good a pair of corner men as you would want to find'". The Newspaper Enterprise Association (NEA) named Van Arsdale an honorable mention All-American in 1965. United Press International (UPI) named both Tom and Dick Van Arsdale first-team academic All-Americans in 1965.

As a sophomore (1962–63), Van Arsdale averaged 12.5 points and 9.3 rebounds per game. As a junior (1963–64), he averaged 21.3 points and 12.3 rebounds per game. In a December 4, 1963 win over Notre Dame, Van Arsdale scored his Indiana career high of 34 points and Dick Van Arsdale scored his Indiana career high of 42 points. He was sixth in the Big Ten Conference in rebounding average and seventh in scoring average. UPI named him second-team All-Big Ten. As a senior (1964–65), Van Arsdale averaged 18.4 points and 8.5 rebounds per game. The Associated Press (AP) named him (and Dick) second-team All-Big Ten Conference.

In three years with the Hoosiers, Van Arsdale scored 1,252 points with 723 rebounds (while his brother scored 1,240 points with 719 rebounds). He averaged a double-double for the Hoosiers over his career, with 17.4 points per game and 10.0 rebounds per game.

While at Indiana, the Van Arsdales were members of the Sigma Alpha Epsilon fraternity, where they roomed for three years with teammate, and future NBA guard, Jon McGlocklin; who was sometimes called the third twin. Van Arsdale was a member of the U.S. team that won the gold medal in the 1965 Summer Universiade.

== Professional career ==
=== Detroit Pistons ===
Van Arsdale was selected 14th overall by the Detroit Pistons in the second round of the 1965 NBA draft, immediately after the New York Knicks had drafted his brother Dick. Among the draft picks counted as being ahead of him were three territorial selections, in addition to players chosen in the normal selection process. Van Arsdale played shooting guard for the Pistons. As a rookie under player-coach Dave DeBusschere, he averaged 25.8 minutes, 10.5 points, 3.9 rebounds, and 2.6 assists per game. He was named to the NBA All-Rookie Team for the 1965–66 season, together with Dick.

The following season (1966–67), Van Arsdale averaged 27 minutes, 12.2 points, 4.3 rebounds, and 2.4 assists per game. It was reported at the end of the 1966–67 NBA season that the Indianapolis franchise in the new American Basketball Association offered Van Arsdale $90,000 over a three-year period if he joined the new league. Van Arsdale said he preferred to stay with the Pistons, but observed that he was being offered double his current salary with the Pistons and had met with officials from the new Indianapolis team. Less than two weeks later he signed a new two-year contract with the Pistons.

The Pistons drafted shooting guard Jimmy Walker with the first pick in the 1967 NBA draft. Walker played nearly 20 minutes a game for the Pistons in the 1967–68 season behind starting shooting guard Eddie Miles. Van Arsdale played in 50 games for the Pistons in the 1967–68 season, averaging just 16.6 minutes per game. On January 31, 1968, the NBA's trade deadline, the Pistons traded Van Arsdale and John Tresvant to the Cincinnati Royals for Happy Hairston and Jim Fox, believing the addition of Hairston could get the Pistons into the playoffs for the first time in years.

=== Cincinnati Royals ===
Van Arsdale joined a Royals team that included his childhood hero Oscar Robertson, and future Hall of Fame forward Jerry Lucas, among others. Van Arsdale played in 27 games for the Royals to finish the season, now as a small forward. He averaged 25.3 minutes, 10.4 points, 3.4 rebounds, and 2.8 assists for the Royals that season. Van Arsdale became the Royals' starting shooting guard in 1968–69, playing alongside Robertson in the backcourt, playing nearly 40 minutes a game over 77 games. He averaged 19.4 points (second to Robertson on the team), 4.6 rebounds, and 2.7 assists per game. The Royals finished the season 41–41, but were a below .500 team for the remainder of Van Arsdale's time with them (1969 to 1973), never making the playoffs in any of his Royals' seasons.

The next season (1969–70), Van Arsdale, now playing small forward, averaged 35.8 minutes per game in 71 games. His 22.8 points per game average was again second only to Robertson on the Royals. Van Arsdale averaged 6.5 rebounds and 2.2 assists per game. He was selected to play as a member of the East team in the 1970 All-Star Game, with his brother Dick being selected as a member of the West team. This was the first time in NBA history two brothers had played in the same NBA All-Star Game.

The Royals traded Robertson to the Milwaukee Bucks in April 1970 for Flynn Robinson and Charley Paulk. The Bucks had tried to trade Robertson earlier in the season, and Robertson made clear he would not return to the Royals for the 1970–71 season. The Royals used their second pick in the March 23, 1970 NBA draft to select future Hall of Fame guard Tiny Archibald, who took over as the Royals' point guard in the 1970–71 season. Van Arsdale led the 1970–71 Royals with a career high 22.9 points per game scoring average; also averaging 6.1 rebounds and 2.2 assists per game. He was selected to play for the East team in the 1971 NBA All-Star Game, with brother Dick once again selected to play for the West team.

Van Arsdale was selected to play in the All-Star game for a third consecutive time in 1972, though Dick was not chosen that year. In 1971–72, again playing small forward, he was second to Archibald on the Royals in scoring, averaging 19.2 points per game; while also averaging 4.8 rebounds and 2.7 assists per game. On February 13, 1972, Van Arsdale scored a career-high 44 points in a 112–111 loss to the Houston Rockets. The Royals became the Kansas City–Omaha Kings going into the 1972–73 season. Van Arsdale played in 49 games with the Kings, averaging 26.2 minutes, 12.4 points, 3.5 rebounds, and 1.8 assists per game. In late January 1973, the Kings traded Van Arsdale and a third round draft choice to the Philadelphia 76ers for John Block.

In 379 games with the Royals/Kings, Van Arsdale averaged 19.2 points, 5.1 rebounds, and 2.4 assists per game.

=== Philadelphia 76ers ===
The 1972–73 Philadelphia 76ers would go on to have the worst 82-game season win–loss record in NBA history, 9–73 (.110). Van Arsdale played 30 games as the 76ers starting small forward that season, averaging 34.3 minutes, 17.7 points, 6.3 rebounds, and 2.1 assists per game. He returned to the 76ers as the team's starting small forward in 1973–74, the 76ers improving to 25–57 that season. In 78 games, Van Arsdale averaged 19.6 points (second to Fred Carter), five rebounds, and 2.6 assists per game. This was the third best scoring average of his career. He played in nine games for the 76ers to begin the 1974–75 season. On November 8, 1974, the 76ers traded Van Arsdale to the Atlanta Hawks for Clyde Lee and a third round draft choice.

=== Atlanta Hawks, Buffalo Braves, and Phoenix Suns ===
Van Arsdale played in 73 games for the 1974–75 Hawks, leading the team with a 35.2 minutes per game average, and was second on the Hawks in scoring (18.9 points per game). He played the following season with the Hawks, averaging 27 minutes, 10.9 points, 2.5 rebounds, and 1.9 assists per game.

In June 1976, the Hawks traded Van Arsdale to the Buffalo Braves for Ken Charles and Dick Gibbs. In late August 1976, the Braves traded Van Arsdale to the Phoenix Suns for a second-round draft choice and cash. Van Arsdale had earlier threatened to retire unless he could play the season in Phoenix, with his brother. Dick Van Arsdale was a long-time player for the Suns, and Van Arsdale himself lived in Phoenix. Van Arsdale joined the team as a reserve forward, but played 27 games as a starter because of injuries on the team. During the 1976–77 season, the Van Arsdale twins played on the same team together for the first time since their college days; after which they both retired.

Overall during his 12-year NBA career, the 6 ft 5 in (1.96 m) Van Arsdale played guard and small forward. He played in 929 games, scoring 14,232 points. He averaged 15.3 points, 4.2 rebounds, and 2.2 assists per game.

== Legacy and honors ==
Van Arsdale was inducted into the Indiana Basketball Hall of Fame in 1988. In February 2019, the Van Arsdale brothers were honored by Indiana at halftime of a game between Indiana and Purdue. Van Arsdale never was on an NBA team that made the postseason. He still holds the NBA record for most career games played (929) and most career points scored (14,232) without a playoff appearance. The original lockers of both Tom and Dick Van Arsdale remain in the display case in the lobby of the Emmerich Manual High School (now Christel House Watanabe Manual High School) gymnasium.

Indiana teammate, 11-year NBA guard, and close friend Jon McGlocklin said of the Van Arsdales, "'People have always asked me all through the college years and pro years, Well which one’s better? . . . Impossible. I honestly, if Jesus asked me that, I could not give him an answer. They’re equal. … Tom and Dick stood their ground with any 6-8 forward in the Big Ten and rebounded. They were outstanding rebounders and they controlled the boards'". Associated Press Sportswriter Mike Recht wrote in April 1971 for the magazine Sports Today that the brothers did not like playing against each other in the NBA.

== Personal life ==
After retiring he and Dick Van Arsdale operated a real estate business together in Phoenix. At some point early in their NBA careers, they observed that Tom Van Arsdale had become ½ inch taller than his brother Dick. Van Arsdale served with the NBA Players Association and Retired Players Association. The brothers did a Miller Lite Beer commercial in 1978. A book about the Van Arsdale brothers was published in 1992, Two of a Kind: The Tom and Dick Van Arsdale Story, with a forward by former NBA coach Cotton Fitzsimmons. After retirement, Van Arsdale authored the book, JOURNEY MAN: Celebrating an Unlucky, Unpredictable, and Undeniably Successful NBA Career. He and Dick shared a post-retirement art studio in Scottsdale, Arizona, which they opened in May 2018. Their art focused on promoting racial tolerance and harmony. Dick died in December 2024.

== NBA career statistics ==
Legend
GP	Games played	GS	Games started	MPG	Minutes per game
FG%	Field goal percentage	3P%	3-point field goal percentage	FT%	Free throw percentage
RPG	Rebounds per game	APG	Assists per game	SPG	Steals per game
BPG	Blocks per game	PPG	Points per game	**Bold**	Career high

=== Regular season ===
Year	Team	GP	GS	MPG	FG%	3P%	FT%	RPG	APG	SPG	BPG	PPG
1965–66	Detroit	79	–	25.8	.374	–	.721	3.9	2.6	–	–	10.5
1966–67	Detroit	79	–	27.0	.391	–	.784	4.3	2.4	–	–	12.2
1967–68	Detroit	50	–	16.6	.371	–	.743	2.6	1.6	–	–	6.6
1967–68	Cincinnati	27	–	25.3	.408	–	.750	3.4	2.8	–	–	10.4
1968–69	Cincinnati	77	–	**39.7**	.444	–	.747	4.6	2.7	–	–	19.4
1969–70	Cincinnati	71	–	35.8	.451	–	.774	**6.5**	2.2	–	–	22.8
1970–71	Cincinnati	**82**	–	38.4	.456	–	.721	6.1	2.2	–	–	**22.9**
1971–72	Cincinnati	73	–	35.6	.456	–	.755	4.8	2.7	–	–	19.2
1972–73	Kansas City–Omaha	49	–	26.2	**.457**	–	.786	3.5	1.8	–	–	12.4
1972–73	Philadelphia	30	–	34.3	.393	–	.833	6.2	2.1	–	–	17.7
1973–74	Philadelphia	78	–	39.0	.428	–	**.851**	5.0	2.6	0.8	0.0	19.6
1974–75	Philadelphia	9	–	30.3	.422	–	.683	3.2	1.8	**1.4**	0.0	14.0
1974–75	Atlanta	73	–	35.2	.429	–	.768	3.4	**2.8**	1.1	0.0	18.9
1975–76	Atlanta	75	–	27.0	.441	–	.759	2.5	1.9	0.8	**0.1**	10.9
1976–77	Phoenix	77	–	18.5	.433	–	.703	2.4	0.9	0.3	0.0	5.8
Career		929	–	30.9	.431	–	.762	4.5	2.2	0.7	0.1	15.3
All-Star		3	0	7.7	.375	–	.333	1.0	0.7	–	–	4.3
