= Jimmy Walker (basketball, born 1944) =

American basketball player (1944–2007)

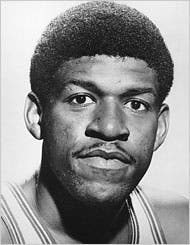
- Walker in 1969

Personal information
- Born: April 8, 1944 Amherst, Virginia, U.S.
- Died: July 2, 2007 (aged 63) Kansas City, Missouri, U.S.
- Listed height: 6 ft 3 in (1.91 m)
- Listed weight: 195 lb (88 kg)

Career information
- High school: Laurinburg Institute (Laurinburg, North Carolina)
- College: Providence (1964–1967)
- NBA draft: 1967: 1st round, 1st overall pick
- Drafted by: Detroit Pistons
- Playing career: 1967–1976
- Position: Shooting guard
- Number: 24, 11

Career history
- 1967–1972: Detroit Pistons
- 1972–1973: Houston Rockets
- 1973–1976: Kansas City-Omaha / Kansas City Kings

Career highlights
- 2× NBA All-Star (1970, 1972); 2× Consensus first-team All-American (1966, 1967); Third-team All-American – AP, UPI (1965); NCAA scoring champion (1967)

Career NBA statistics
- Points: 11,655 (16.7 ppg)
- Rebounds: 1,860 (2.7 rpg)
- Assists: 2,429 (3.5 apg)
- Stats at NBA.com
- Stats at Basketball Reference
- Collegiate Basketball Hall of Fame

James Walker (April 8, 1944 – July 2, 2007) was an American professional basketball player. A 6-foot-3-inch (1.91 m) guard, he played nine seasons (1967–1976) in the National Basketball Association (NBA) as a member of the Detroit Pistons, Houston Rockets, and Kansas City-Omaha / Kansas City Kings. Walker was a two-time All-Star who scored 11,655 points in his career. He was also the father of former NBA player Jalen Rose, though he left Rose's mother prior to his birth and took no part in his child's upbringing. Walker died on July 2, 2007, at the age of 63, from complications related to lung cancer.

== Early life ==
Walker grew up in Boston's Roxbury neighborhood.

Walker attended Laurinburg Institute, a black preparatory school in North Carolina and later earned a scholarship to play at Providence College.

== College career ==
Walker attended Providence College, where he played under head coach Joe Mullaney.

At Providence, Walker's game (much as that of Michigan star Cazzie Russell) was compared to that of the premier player of the era, Cincinnati Royals superstar Oscar Robertson. Walker averaged 23 points as a junior, and led the nation with 30 points per game as a senior. His career high of 50 points came in the 1965 Madison Square Garden Holiday Basketball Festival title game, when Providence defeated Bob Cousy's Boston College Eagles team 91–86 to win the tournament. For his efforts, Walker was named MVP of the tournament. Walker was also named MVP of the 1966 Holiday Festival when Providence defeated Saint Joseph's University and Cliff Anderson in the title game. With the two awards, Walker was the first player to be named MVP in the Holiday Festival two consecutive seasons. He was considered to be the first college player to use the between-the-legs dribble as a cross-over move.

Walker led the nation in scoring in his senior year of 1966–67, averaging 30.4 points a game. He caught and passed UCLA's Lew Alcindor in the final weeks of the season. Walker's 2,000-plus career points led Providence for four decades, until his all-time scoring record was broken in 2005 by Ryan Gomes. Walker was able to accomplish this in only three seasons; at the time, freshmen were not allowed to play varsity basketball. Jimmy Walker ended his college career in the quarterfinals of the 1967 NIT in the last basketball tournament held at the third Madison Square Garden, when he scored 36 points but missed a jump shot at the end of the game as Providence bowed to Marquette 81–80 in overtime. Walker later said that the missed shot was the only thing that went wrong for him in Madison Square Garden.

Overall, Walker averaged 25.2 points, 6.3 rebounds and 5.3 assists in his three seasons (81 games) at Providence. In 2003, he was inducted into the Athletics Hall of Fame.

== NBA career ==
Walker was selected #1 overall pick in the 1967 NBA draft by the Detroit Pistons. He was also drafted #1 overall in the inaugural American Basketball Association Draft by the Indiana Pacers. 1967 was the first year the NBA had abandoned its territorial draft (under the old draft, which granted an extra first-round pick to be used on collegians within 100 miles of their professional team, Walker might have been selected by the Celtics and teamed with his mentor Sam Jones). Walker was also the final pick in the 1967 NFL draft by the New Orleans Saints (the pick now known as Mr. Irrelevant), despite never having played college football; this makes Walker the only athlete drafted first by one pro league (two in his case) and last by another.

In the middle of the 1968–69 season, Walker was nearly traded to the New York Knicks for Walt Bellamy, but the firing of Donnie Butcher for Paul Seymour meant that he nixed the trade and instead wanted Dave DeBusschere traded to New York for Bellamy, which was accepted.

Despite playing in two NBA All-Star games, Walker never reached his full potential as a pro, partly due to his weight gain. His game had been predicated on quickness. Nonetheless, he averaged 20.9 ppg in 1969–70, 21.3 in 1971–72, and 19.8 in 1973–74, averaging almost 17 per game over a 9-year career. The numbers are all the more impressive when one considers that Walker teamed with star guards such as Dave Bing in Detroit, and Nate Archibald in Kansas City-Omaha.

Overall in 698 games with the Detroit Pistons (1967–1972), Houston Rockets (1972–1973), and Kansas City Kings (1973–1976), Walker averaged 16.7 points, 2.7 rebounds, and 3.5 assists in his NBA career.

== NBA career statistics ==
Legend
GP	Games played	GS	Games started	MPG	Minutes per game
FG%	Field goal percentage	3P%	3-point field goal percentage	FT%	Free throw percentage
RPG	Rebounds per game	APG	Assists per game	SPG	Steals per game
BPG	Blocks per game	PPG	Points per game	**Bold**	Career high
†	Won an NBA championship

=== Regular season ===
Year	Team	GP	GS	MPG	FG%	3P%	FT%	RPG	APG	SPG	BPG	PPG
1967–68	Detroit	**81**	—	19.6	.394	—	.766	1.7	2.8	—	—	8.8
1968–69	Detroit	69	—	23.8	.466	—	.795	2.3	3.2	—	—	11.7
1969–70	Detroit	**81**	—	35.4	.478	—	.807	3.0	3.1	—	—	20.8
1970–71	Detroit	79	—	35.0	.436	—	.831	2.6	3.4	—	—	17.6
1971–72	Detroit	78	—	39.5	.457	—	.827	3.0	4.0	—	—	**21.3**
1972–73	Houston	**81**	—	38.0	.465	—	**.884**	**3.3**	**5.5**	—	—	18.0
1973–74	Houston	3	—	12.7	**.583**	—	.000	.7	1.3	.0	.0	4.7
1973–74	Kansas City–Omaha	72	—	**40.6**	.468	—	.822	2.8	4.2	1.1	.1	19.8
1974–75	Kansas City–Omaha	**81**	—	38.5	.475	—	.855	3.0	2.8	1.0	**.2**	16.7
1975–76	Kansas City	73	—	34.1	.483	—	.865	2.4	2.4	**1.2**	**.2**	15.7
Career		698	—	33.8	.461	—	.829	2.7	3.5	1.1	.2	16.7
All-Star		2	0	15.0	.333	—	.500	1.5	.5	—	—	5.5

=== Playoffs ===
Year	Team	GP	GS	MPG	FG%	3P%	FT%	RPG	APG	SPG	BPG	PPG
1968	Detroit	**6**	—	20.2	.463	—	**.824**	1.5	1.5	—	—	12.7
1975	Kansas City–Omaha	**6**	—	**37.5**	**.464**	—	.778	**1.7**	**2.8**	**.8**	**.2**	**15.3**
Career		12	—	28.8	.464	—	.800	1.6	2.2	.8	.2	14.0

=== College statistics ===
Year	Team	GP	GS	MPG	FG%	3P%	FT%	RPG	APG	SPG	BPG	PPG
1964–65	Providence	26	—	37.5	.475	—	.769	6.1	5.2	—	—	20.5
1965–66	Providence	27	—	39.0	**.508**	—	.772	**6.7**	**5.5**	—	—	24.5
1966–67	Providence	**28**	—	**39.7**	.490	—	**.801**	6.0	5.1	—	—	**30.4**
**Career**		81	—	38.8	.492	—	.783	6.3	5.3	—	—	25.2

== Personal life ==
Walker initially settled in Kansas City when his career ended before spending a few years in Amherst, Virginia and Atlanta, Georgia. He moved back to Kansas City in 1994 after his daughter, Jamesa Walker-Thompson, was diagnosed with cancer.

In the leadup to the NCAA Tournament in 1992, Walker sent a letter (addressed to Rose) to Detroit Free Press columnist Mitch Albom, as he had been interviewed by him for a book on the Fab Five. Rose wanted to wait until he was mature enough to read the letter and did not read it for eight years. In that same time, Austin Croshere, a Providence graduate who won the school's MVP award that bore Walker's name, was drafted by the Indiana Pacers, who Rose was playing with at the time. He gave Rose a paper that had Walker's phone number on it. In 2000, Rose opened the letter and eventually decided to call the number. The two spoke a few times over the phone and by e-mail but never met. They made plans to meet in person in the month that Walker died. Rose attended the funeral of Walker, who was cremated.

== Honors ==
The basketball award at Providence is called the Jimmy Walker Most Valuable Player Award.

In 2008, Providence honored Walker's number with The Friar Legends Forever Tradition.

Jalen Rose hosted the Providence Late Night Event in 2014.
