= John Tresvant =

American basketball player

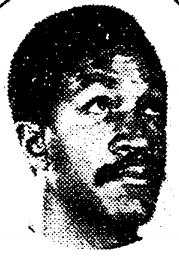

Personal information
- Born: November 6, 1939 (age 87) Washington, D.C., U.S.
- Listed height: 6 ft 7 in (2.01 m)
- Listed weight: 215 lb (98 kg)

Career information
- High school: Spingarn (Washington, D.C.)
- College: Seattle (1961–1964)
- NBA draft: 1964: 5th round, 40th overall pick
- Drafted by: St. Louis Hawks
- Playing career: 1964–1973
- Position: Power forward / center
- Number: 25, 27, 23, 30, 14, 12

Career history
- 1964–1965: St. Louis Hawks
- 1965–1968: Detroit Pistons
- 1968–1969: Cincinnati Royals
- 1969–1970: Seattle SuperSonics
- 1970: Los Angeles Lakers
- 1970–1972: Baltimore Bullets

Career statistics
- Points: 5,118 (9.2 ppg)
- Rebounds: 3,546 (6.3 rpg)
- Assists: 806 (1.4 apg)
- Stats at NBA.com
- Stats at Basketball Reference

John B. Tresvant (born November 6, 1939) is an American former basketball player. Tresvant played from 1964 to 1973 in the National Basketball Association (NBA), playing for six teams, the St. Louis Hawks, Detroit Pistons, Cincinnati Royals, Seattle SuperSonics, Los Angeles Lakers, and Baltimore Bullets. His teams reached the NBA finals in 1970 and 1971. His defense against Connie Hawkins in the first round of the 1970 NBA playoffs was a key factor in the Lakers not being eliminated by the Phoenix Suns.

Tresvant played college basketball at Seattle University, twice playing a key role in leading the team to the NCAA Division I men's basketball tournament. He averaged a double-double in his junior and senior years. As a junior in 1963, Tresvant set the school record for rebounds in a game with 40, breaking Elgin Baylor's school record.

== Early life ==
Tresvant was born on November 6, 1939, in Washington, D.C. Tresvant attended Spingarn High School in Washington. He played on Spingarn's football team at end, and on its baseball team as a catcher and first baseman. Tresvant was also a member of the Spingarn High School basketball team, playing as a reserve under coach William Rountree. Tresvant was a year behind future Naismith Basketball Hall of Famer Elgin Baylor at Springarn.

Years after graduating high school, when Tresvant was a 6 ft 7 in (2.01 m) star basketball player at Seattle University, he said of his high school basketball days, "'I was 6–3 and awkward . . . Basketball was my poorest sport. I did better as a football end and hit .333 as a baseball catcher and first baseman'". Tresvant stated that when coach Rountree heard Tresvant was a starter for Seattle's basketball team, his old high school coach "'wouldn't believe it'", Tresvant adding "'I don't blame him a bit'".

After graduating, Tresvant joined the U.S. Air Force. He was stationed at Paine Field in Everett, Washington and repaired aircraft radar units. He grew several inches and was playing Amateur Athletic Union (AAU) basketball when Seattle University head basketball coach Vince Cazzetta saw Tresvant and encouraged Tresvant to attend Seattle, giving Tresvant a scholarship after his military service had concluded.

== College career ==
A 6 ft 6 in (1.98 m) forward/center in college, Tresvant played three varsity seasons for Seattle. As a sophomore (1961–62), he averaged 8.1 points and 7.8 rebounds per game. That Seattle team was 18–9 under coach Cazzetta, and was led by Tresvant's future Detroit Pistons' and Baltimore Bullets' teammate Eddie Miles.

Tresvant became a starter as a junior after learning to understand and enjoy the value of playing defense as much as being a scorer. As a junior (1962–63), Tresvant averaged 11.7 points and 11.6 rebounds per game. Coach Cazzetta unexpectedly resigned on February 6, 1963, and was replaced by assistant coach Clair Markey as interim head coach. Two days later, Seattle defeated the Montana Grizzlies 100–63. At the time it was reported that Tresvant scored 24 points and set a Seattle record with 39 rebounds in that game. It was ultimately determined that Tresvant officially had 40 rebounds in that game in breaking Elgin Baylor's Seattle record. It is the fourth-highest total for a single game in NCAA history (though Tresvant himself believes it should have been 44). Tresvant had four more rebounds than the entire Montana team.

Seattle had a 21–6 record that season, and was chosen to play in the 1963 NCAA Division I men's basketball tournament. On March 11, 1963, Seattle lost to Oregon State, 70–66, in the first round of the West Regional tournament. Tresvant had 16 points and Miles 28 for Seattle, but no other Seattle player scored more than nine points.

Under new head coach Bob Boyd, Tresvant averaged 17.9 points and 14 rebounds per game as a senior (1963–64), leading the team in both categories (Miles having graduated). Seattle was 22–6 that season. Tresvant led Seattle to the 1964 NCAA Division I men's basketball tournament. Seattle upset the No. 5 Oregon State Beavers, 61–57, in the first round of the West Regional tournament, despite having lost to the Beavers twice earlier that season (85–79 and 76–72). Tresvant and teammate L. J. Wheeler fouled out of the game trying to cover Oregon State's seven foot center Mel Counts (who took 18 free throws in the game), and only scored five points. Seattle lost in the next round to the eventual national champion, No. 1 ranked UCLA, 95–90. Tresvant had 20 points and 20 rebounds against UCLA.

In 1964, Tresvant was an NCAA Far West Region All-Star selection. United Press International (UPI) named him to its All-West Coast second team. He was also selected by a group of college coaches to the second-team Northwest All-Star team that year. During his three-year Seattle career, Tresvant averaged 12.6 points and 11.1 rebounds per game.

Tresvant studied accounting at Seattle. As a 25-year old senior, Tresvant said his dream was to play in the NBA, but "'My reality is to be an accountant'". In that later vein, he hoped to find work with the Internal Revenue Service.

== NBA career ==
The St. Louis Hawks selected Tresvant in the fifth round of the 1964 NBA draft, 42nd overall. He played nine seasons in the league with St. Louis, the Detroit Pistons, the Cincinnati Royals, the Seattle SuperSonics, the Los Angeles Lakers, and the Baltimore Bullets, posting NBA career averages of 9.2 points and 6.3 rebounds per game.

=== St. Louis Hawks ===
The Hawks also drafted Creighton's power forward Paul Silas in the second round of the 1964 draft, the NCAA's leading rebounder in 1963–64. Both Tresvant and Silas were expected to make the Hawks' roster for the 1964–65 season, though Silas was anticipated to have a greater impact with the Hawks. Tresvant only played in the Hawks' first four games that season. In early November 1964, the Hawks placed Tresvant on the voluntary retired list so Tresvant could return to Seattle University to complete the 15 hours of coursework necessary to obtain his business degree. He was reportedly persuaded to do so, and told to then come back for the 1965–66 season to try out again for the Hawks.

Tresvant returned to the Hawks for the 1965–66 season. He played 15 games for the Hawks as a reserve power forward, averaging 14.2 minutes, 6.7 points, and 5.7 rebounds per game. His best game as a Hawk was against the Baltimore Bullets where he had 14 points and 10 rebounds in just 16 minutes. The Hawks put him on the inactive list to make room for Paul Silas on their roster. On December 24, 1965, the Hawks traded Tresvant and Chico Vaughn to the Detroit Pistons for Rod Thorn. Hawks' coach Richie Guerin had intended to keep five forwards on the team's roster, including Tresvant; but injuries caused Guerin to reduce that number to four, requiring that either Tresvant or Silas be traded. Guerin believed Silas was the more proven player in the NBA and traded Tresvant.

=== Detroit Pistons ===
In Detroit, Tresvant joined his former Seattle teammate Eddie Miles, who was the Pistons' leading scorer. The team was led by its 25-year old player-coach, Dave DeBusschere. Tresvant played in 46 games for the Pistons as a reserve power forward that season (1965–66), averaging 16.4 minutes, 8.3 points, and 6.1 rebounds per game. He made his Pistons' debut on Christmas Day 1965, with 11 points and three rebounds. He had six double-doubles with the Pistons that season, including a 22 point, 16 rebound game against the Los Angeles Lakers and Elgin Baylor, and a 14 point and game-high 22 rebound game against Jerry Lucas, Oscar Robertson, Happy Hairston, and the Cincinnati Royals.

Tresvant played in 68 games for the Pistons the following season (1966–67). He averaged 22.8 minutes, 9.9 points, and 7.1 rebounds per game. He had 13 double-doubles that season, including among others, an 18 point, 15 rebound game against the Royals; a 25 point, 10 rebound game against the San Francisco Warriors; a 22 point, 11 rebound game against the Hawks; and a 16 point, 18 rebound game against the Chicago Bulls. Tresvant joined the Pistons starting lineup late in the season.

Tresvant played in 55 games for the Pistons in the 1967–68 season, averaging 30.4 minutes, 13.3 points, 9.8 rebounds, and 2.1 assists per game. On January 31, 1968, the NBA's trade deadline, the Pistons traded Tresvant and Tom Van Arsdale to the Cincinnati Royals for Happy Hairston and Jim Fox. Tresvant played in 169 games for the Pistons, averaging 23.6 minutes, 10.6 points, 7.7 rebounds, and 1.6 assists per game.

=== Cincinnati Royals ===
Tresvant played in 30 games for the Royals in finishing the 1967–68 season, averaging 26.7 minutes, 10.3 points, and 5.6 rebounds per game. The Royals' starting power forward was future Hall of Famer Jerry Lucas, who average over 44 minutes per game of playing time. The following season (1968–69), Tresvant played in 51 games for the Royals, mostly as a starter. He averaged 33 minutes, 11.9 points, and 8.2 rebounds per game. For the second consecutive season, however, Tresvant was traded at the January 31 trade deadline. The Royals traded Tresvant to the Seattle SuperSonics for second-year forward Al Tucker, the SuperSonics first draft pick in 1967. In 81 games over his two seasons with Cincinnati, Tresvant averaged 30.7 minutes, 11.3 points, 7.3 rebounds, and 1.8 assists per game.

=== Seattle SuperSonics ===
In 26 games as the SuperSonics' starting power forward at the end of the 1968–69 season, Tresvant averaged a double-double: 13.6 points and 10.3 rebounds in nearly 31 minutes per game. The Supersonics acquired power forward Bob Boozer in September 1969. Boozer played in all 82 games that season, averaging over 31 minutes per game at power forward. Tresvant played in 49 games for the SuperSonics that season, averaging 26.1 minutes, 12.6 points, and 7.4 rebounds per game. On January 21, 1970, the SuperSonics sold Tresvant's contract rights to the Los Angeles Lakers. Tresvant played in 75 games for the SuperSonics during his time with them, averaging 12.9 points and 8.4 rebounds in nearly 28 minutes per game.

=== Los Angeles Lakers ===
The 1969–70 Lakers were the first playoff team for which Tresvant had played. In 20 regular season games, he averaged 11.1 minutes, 5.9 points, and 3.2 rebounds per game. The Lakers defeated the Phoenix Suns in seven games to win the 1970 NBA Western Division semifinals. Tresvant played in five of those games, averaging 18.2 minutes, 5.8 points, four rebounds, and 1.2 assists per game. More importantly, his defense against Suns' future Hall of Fame forward Connie Hawkins was a key factor in the Lakers surviving a three games to one series deficit, to win the series in seven games.

The Lakers did not use Tresvant in Games 2 and 3 against the Suns; both losses. Even with Wilt Chamberlain at center for the Lakers, Suns forwards Paul Silas and future Hall of Famer Hawkins were overpowering Laker forwards Elgin Baylor and Happy Hairston. In Game 4, Lakers' coach Joe Mullaney substituted Tresvant (29 minutes) and Rick Roberson (24 minutes) to go up against the Suns' forwards. Even though Tresvant played well defensively on Hawkins, the Lakers lacked offense and lost again; and were down three games to one in the best-of-seven series.

Mullaney started Tresvant in Game 5. He played 25 minutes, and scored 16 points with nine rebounds and three assists. Tresvant was again assigned to defend Hawkins, and although Hawkins had 28 points Tresvant "stifled his playmaking tactics". Mullany gave Tresvant special praise after the game, stating "'I though Tresvant did a good job defensing Hawkins . . . Maybe I should have used John earlier in the series, but I didn't think he was quick enough to play against Phoenix". Tresvant started Game 6 in the Lakers win, but only played 13 minutes. He started Game 7, playing 23 minutes, with five points and five rebounds in the Lakers series clinching victory. More significantly, even though Hawkins scored 25 points in the game, Tresvant did a good defensive job against Hawkins. Overall, once the Lakers started using Tresvant to defend Hawkins in the series, Hawkins became less effective offensively.

The Lakers then swept the Atlanta Hawks in four games to win the NBA Western Division finals. Tresvant was called on to play in only two games, averaging nine points, 3.5 rebounds, and 2.5 assists in only 10 minutes per game. The Lakers lost the 1970 NBA finals in seven games to the New York Knicks. Tresvant played in four of those games. Although playing only six minutes, Tresvant supplied the energy off the bench in Game 4 of the finals that led the Lakers to an overtime win.

Tresvant had not played in the first three games against the Knicks. He entered Game 4 with only 56 seconds left in regulation play, and the score tied. With nine second left in regulation, Tresvant made a "great defensive play" in "knocking away an inbounded ball aimed for Willis Reed", sending the game to overtime. Mullaney kept Tresvant in the game for the overtime period. The Lakers scored 22 points in the five-minute overtime period to win the game, with Tresvant stealing the ball and making two foul shots early in the overtime period; and then making a later free throw and passing to Jerry West for a fast break score. He had three points, three rebounds, and two assists to go along with his defensive impact over the game's last six minutes. As reported by the New York Times, "John Tresvant, an experienced substitute who didn't play at all in this series until the final minute of tonight's fourth quarter, sparked the 22‐point surge of the Lakers in the five‐minute extra period".

Tresvant played in the three remaining games of the 1970 NBA finals. He played eight minutes with five points in Game 5; 11 minutes with seven points, six rebounds and three assists in Game 6; and 12 minutes with three points and two rebounds in Game 7. He began the 1970–71 season with the Lakers, playing in eight games and averaging 8.3 minutes, 5.4 points, 2.9 rebounds and 1.3 assists per game. On November 12, the Lakers traded Tresvant to the Baltimore Bullets for a future high draft choice.

=== Baltimore Bullets ===
Tresvant joined his former Seattle University and Detroit Pistons' teammate Eddie Miles with the Bullets, as well as Al Tucker for whom he had once been traded. Tresvant played in 67 regular season games for the 1970–71 Bullets. He averaged 21.7 minutes, 7.6 points, 5.4 rebounds, and 1.1 assists per game.

The Bullets future Hall of Fame power forward Gus Johnson was injured in late January 1971, and only appeared in 14 of the Bullets last 30 games of the regular season. Tresvant's playing time at power forward increased during this period as he became the starting power forward when Johnson missed games. After playing as much as 30 minutes in a game only once before Johnson's injury, he started in Johnson's place on January 29, and played 32 minutes with a 15 point, 10 rebound double-double. On February 5, Tresvant started and played 39 minutes against the Buffalo Braves with 18 points and 16 rebounds. In the Bullets last 30 games of the regular season, Tresvant played over 30 minutes 13 times, and had eight double-doubles.

Johnson was able to play in the 1971 NBA Eastern Conference semifinals against the Philadelphia 76ers, averaging nearly 38 minutes per game. The Bullets won that series in seven games. Tresvant played in all seven games, averaging 14.1 minutes, 6.1 points, and 3.6 rebounds per game. The Bullets went on to play 11 more playoff games that season; in the Eastern Division finals against the New York Knicks and then in the 1971 NBA Finals against the Milwaukee Bucks. However, the injured Johnson only managed to play parts of two games in each of those series, making Tresvant the Bullets' starting power forward in those two series.

The Bullets defeated the reigning NBA champion Knicks in a seven-game Eastern Conference finals. Tresvant started all seven games, averaging 38 minutes, 11 points and 12 rebounds per game. During the series, he defended against Knicks Hall of Fame forward Dave DeBusschere, his former Detroit teammate and coach. In a Game 4 Bullets win, Tresvant played a key role in grabbing 17 rebounds and holding DeBusschere to 12 points; and scored 20 points in the Bullets' Game 6 win. The Bullets were then swept in the NBA finals by the Milwaukee Bucks, where Tresvant again started in every game, averaging 30 minutes, 7.3 points, and 6.5 rebounds per game. He averaged 12.8 rebounds per game over 18 playoff games in 1971, and had the most personal fouls (64) of any player in the playoffs that year.

Tresvant played two more seasons in Baltimore before his NBA career ended. In 65 games during the 1971–72 season, he averaged 18.9 minutes, 6.8 points, five rebounds, and 1.3 assists per game. The Bullets played the Knicks in the Eastern Conference semifinals, losing in six games. Tresvant played all six games, averaging 30 minutes, 7.8 points, and 9.7 rebounds per game. He played 42 minutes in the Bullets' 104–103 Game 3 victory, with 15 points and 12 rebounds. Tresvant preserved the Bullets' one-point win in that game when he blocked Earl Monroe's shot and recovered the ball with 26 seconds left to play.

The following season, his last in the NBA, Tresvant played in 55 games, averaging less than 10 minutes per game. He played in five playoff games that season, the last games of his career; averaged 10 minutes, 2.4 points, and 3.2 rebounds per game. Tresvant played in 187 games for the Bullets from 1970 to 1973, the most for any team he played with during his career.

=== Chicago Bulls ===
In early September 1973, the Bullets traded Tresvant to the Chicago Bulls for future considerations, but he did not play for the Bulls that season. Tresvant had an injured knee during the Bulls' preseason, and the team released him on October 1, 1973.

== Honors ==
Tresvant has been inducted into the Seattle University Athletics Hall of Fame.

== Personal life ==
After retiring from basketball because of a knee injury, Tresvant worked as an industrial arts teacher and middle school basketball coach. He operated the John Tresvant School of Basketball teaching fundamental basketball skills to children. In 2006, he invented the Total Rebounder Exercise System (TRES), a basket designed for use in training young players in rebounding techniques.

Tresvant is divorced and the father of three grown children. As of 2006, he resided in Snohomish, Washington.

== Career statistics ==
Legend
GP	Games played	GS	Games started	MPG	Minutes per game
FG%	Field goal percentage	3P%	3-point field goal percentage	FT%	Free throw percentage
RPG	Rebounds per game	APG	Assists per game	SPG	Steals per game
BPG	Blocks per game	PPG	Points per game	**Bold**	Career high
*	Led the league

=== NBA ===
==== Regular season ====
Year	Team	GP	MPG	FG%	FT%	RPG	APG	PPG
1964–65	St. Louis	4	8.8	.364	.667	4.5	1.5	3.5
1965–66	Cincinnati	15	14.2	.474	**.844**	5.7	.7	6.7
1965–66	Detroit	46	16.4	.416	.728	6.1	1.3	8.3
1966–67	Detroit	68	22.8	.438	.701	7.1	1.3	9.9
1967–68	Detroit	**55***	30.4	.461	.658	9.8	2.1	13.3
1967–68	Cincinnati	**30***	26.7	.448	.632	5.6	1.5	10.3
1968–69	Cincinnati	51	**33.0**	.450	.583	8.2	2.0	11.9
1968–69	Seattle	26	30.8	.488	.673	**10.3**	**2.4**	**13.6**
1969–70	Seattle	49	26.1	.428	.735	7.4	1.9	12.6
1969–70	L.A. Lakers	20	11.1	**.534**	.657	3.2	.9	5.9
1970–71	L.A. Lakers	8	8.3	.514	.700	2.9	1.3	5.4
1970–71	Baltimore	67	21.7	.459	.713	5.4	1.1	7.6
1971–72	Baltimore	65	18.9	.450	.818	5.0	1.3	6.8
1972–73	Baltimore	55	9.8	.467	.695	2.8	.6	3.8
Career		559	22.0	.451	.693	6.3	1.4	9.2

==== Playoffs ====
Year	Team	GP	MPG	FG%	FT%	RPG	APG	PPG
1970	L.A. Lakers	11	13.5	**.451**	**.826**	3.5	**1.5**	5.9
1971	Baltimore	**18***	26.9	.409	.667	7.4	1.1	**8.3**
1972	Baltimore	6	**30.0**	.417	.636	**9.7**	1.0	7.8
1973	Baltimore	5	10.0	.333	.500	3.2	.6	2.4
Career		40	21.6	.414	.695	6.2	1.1	6.9

== See also ==
- List of NCAA Division I men's basketball players with 30 or more rebounds in a game
