= George Patterson (basketball) =

American basketball player

Personal information
- Born: November 26, 1939
- Died: December 22, 2003 (aged 64) Sanibel Island, Florida, U.S.
- Listed height: 6 ft 8 in (2.03 m)
- Listed weight: 230 lb (104 kg)

Career information
- High school: Central Catholic (Pittsburgh, Pennsylvania)
- College: Toledo (1958–1961)
- NBA draft: 1961: 12th round, 100th overall pick
- Drafted by: Cincinnati Royals
- Playing career: 1967–1968
- Position: Center
- Number: 20

Career history
- 1967–1968: Detroit Pistons

Career highlights
- Second-team All-MAC (1960)

Career statistics
- Points: 120
- Rebounds: 159
- Assists: 51
- Stats at NBA.com
- Stats at Basketball Reference

George Patterson (November 26, 1939 – December 22, 2003) was an American professional basketball player who played in the National Basketball Association (NBA). Patterson was originally drafted in the twelfth round of the 1961 NBA draft by the Cincinnati Royals. He would finally play in the NBA with the Detroit Pistons from 1967 to 1968. Later, he was selected by the Milwaukee Bucks in the 1968 NBA expansion draft.

He attended high school in Pittsburgh, Pennsylvania.

George Patterson was the grandfather of Shea Patterson, former quarterback of the University of Michigan football team.

== Career statistics ==
Legend
GP	Games played	GS	Games started	MPG	Minutes per game
FG%	Field goal percentage	3P%	3-point field goal percentage	FT%	Free throw percentage
RPG	Rebounds per game	APG	Assists per game	SPG	Steals per game
BPG	Blocks per game	PPG	Points per game	**Bold**	Career high

=== NBA ===
==== Regular season ====
Year	Team	GP	MPG	FG%	FT%	RPG	APG	PPG
1967–68	Detroit	59	9.5	.331	.842	2.7	.9	2.0

==== Playoffs ====
Year	Team	GP	MPG	FG%	FT%	RPG	APG	PPG
1968	Detroit	1	4.0	–	–	1.0	1.0	.0
