= 1965–66 Detroit Pistons season =

NBA team season

- Head coach: Dave DeBusschere
- Owner: Fred Zollner
- Arena: Cobo Arena

Results
- Record: 22–58 (.275)
- Place: Division: 5th (Western)
- Playoff finish: Did not qualify
- Stats at Basketball Reference

The 1965–66 Detroit Pistons season was the Detroit Pistons' 18th season in the NBA and its ninth season in the city of Detroit. The team played at Cobo Arena in Detroit.

Before the start of the 1965–66 season, the Pistons lost their leading scorer, Terry Dischinger, due to military service, and starting center, Reggie Harding, due to suspension. On September 28, 1965, general manager Don Wattrick died of a heart attack. The team's first round pick in the 1965 NBA draft, Bill Buntin did not sign until October due to a contract dispute.

The Pistons struggled on the season, finishing 22-58 (.275), 5th in the Western Division and with the worst record in the NBA. The team was led on the season by guard Eddie Miles (19.6 ppg, NBA All-Star) and player-coach Dave DeBusschere (16.4 ppg, 11.6 rpg, NBA All-Star). Rookie guard Tom Van Arsdale (10.5 ppg, NBA First-Team All-Rookie) added to the cause. Adding insult on the year, two Baltimore Bullets, Don Ohl and Bailey Howell, made the NBA All-Star game, having been traded the year prior by the Pistons.

== Roster ==
1965–66 Detroit Pistons roster
Players

Pos.	No.	Player	Height	Weight	DOB	From
G	21	John Barnhill	6 ft 1 in (1.85 m)	180 lb (82 kg)	1938–03–20	Tennessee State
C	17	Bill Buntin	6 ft 7 in (2.01 m)	250 lb (113 kg)	1942–05–05	Michigan
G	24	Donnis Butcher	6 ft 2 in (1.88 m)	200 lb (91 kg)	1936–02–08	Pikeville
F	22	Dave DeBusschere	6 ft 6 in (1.98 m)	220 lb (100 kg)	1940–10–16	Detroit Mercy
C	19	Reggie Harding (S)	7 ft 0 in (2.13 m)	249 lb (113 kg)	1942–05–04	Nashville Christian Institute (TN)
F	16	Don Kojis	6 ft 5 in (1.96 m)	215 lb (98 kg)	1939–01–15	Marquette
G	14	Eddie Miles	6 ft 4 in (1.93 m)	195 lb (88 kg)	1940–07–05	Seattle
F	20	Ron Reed	6 ft 5 in (1.96 m)	205 lb (93 kg)	1942–11–02	Notre Dame
F	12	Ray Scott	6 ft 9 in (2.06 m)	215 lb (98 kg)	1938–07–12	Portland
C	16	Joe Strawder	6 ft 10 in (2.08 m)	235 lb (107 kg)	1940–09–21	Bradley
F	23	John Tresvant	6 ft 7 in (2.01 m)	215 lb (98 kg)	1939–11–06	Seattle
G	5	Tom Van Arsdale	6 ft 5 in (1.96 m)	202 lb (92 kg)	1943–02–22	Indiana
G	10	Chico Vaughn	6 ft 2 in (1.88 m)	190 lb (86 kg)	1940–02–19	Southern Illinois
G	18	Bob Warlick	6 ft 5 in (1.96 m)	200 lb (91 kg)	1941–03–20	Pepperdine

Coaches
Head coach

Dave DeBusschere

Legend
- (DP) Unsigned draft pick
- (FA) Free agent
- (S) Suspended
- Injured

Roster
Updated: 1965–12–28

== Regular season ==
=== Season standings ===
Western Division	W	L	PCT	GB	Home	Road	Neutral	Div
x-Los Angeles Lakers	45	35	.563	–	28–11	13–21	4–3	29–11
x-Baltimore Bullets	38	42	.475	7	29–9	4–25	5–8	20–20
x-St. Louis Hawks	36	44	.450	9	22–10	6–22	8–12	19–21
San Francisco Warriors	35	45	.438	10	12–14	8–19	15–12	21–19
Detroit Pistons	22	58	.275	23	13–17	4–22	5–19	11–29

=== Game log ===
1965–66 Game log
#	Date	Opponent	Score	High points	Record
1	October 16	@ New York	103–111	Dave DeBusschere (23)	0–1
2	October 20	New York	103–116	Joe Caldwell (18)	1–1
3	October 23	@ Philadelphia	103–120	Eddie Miles (21)	1–2
4	October 26	Baltimore	117–98	Don Kojis (15)	1–3
5	October 27	@ Baltimore	108–107	Bill Buntin (25)	2–3
6	October 29	Boston	106–108	Eddie Miles (36)	3–3
7	October 30	@ St. Louis	95–122	Dave DeBusschere (20)	3–4
8	October 31	@ Cincinnati	107–113	Eddie Miles (29)	3–5
9	November 3	Philadelphia	100–110	Eddie Miles (27)	4–5
10	November 5	Cincinnati	120–114	Tom Van Arsdale (24)	4–6
11	November 6	@ San Francisco	100–110	Rod Thorn (29)	4–7
12	November 9	@ San Francisco	102–107	DeBusschere, Miles (24)	4–8
13	November 10	@ Los Angeles	125–133	Eddie Miles (30)	4–9
14	November 12	San Francisco	103–102	Eddie Miles (21)	4–10
15	November 13	@ Boston	93–122	Donnis Butcher (15)	4–11
16	November 16	@ New York	95–120	Ray Scott (26)	4–12
17	November 19	New York	116–109	Ray Scott (23)	4–13
18	November 20	@ St. Louis	101–110	Rod Thorn (20)	4–14
19	November 23	N Cincinnati	118–115	DeBusschere, Miles (25)	5–14
20	November 24	Baltimore	124–130	Ray Scott (31)	6–14
21	November 26	N Boston	114–134	Ray Scott (25)	6–15
22	November 28	Los Angeles	128–110	Rod Thorn (21)	6–16
23	December 1	St. Louis	110–101	Ray Scott (23)	6–17
24	December 4	Baltimore	119–130	Eddie Miles (36)	7–17
25	December 8	San Francisco	113–115	Eddie Miles (30)	8–17
26	December 10	@ Philadelphia	116–114	Ray Scott (32)	9–17
27	December 14	N Baltimore	129–142	Dave DeBusschere (30)	9–18
28	December 17	Boston	114–112	Ray Scott (32)	9–19
29	December 18	@ Baltimore	114–143	Ray Scott (21)	9–20
30	December 22	N San Francisco	114–104	Eddie Miles (20)	9–21
31	December 23	@ Los Angeles	112–122	Ray Scott (19)	9–22
32	December 25	@ Los Angeles	106–115	Eddie Miles (35)	9–23
33	December 28	N San Francisco	120–107	Eddie Miles (24)	9–24
34	December 29	Philadelphia	113–112	Dave DeBusschere (28)	9–25
35	December 30	N Los Angeles	114–117	Dave DeBusschere (20)	10–25
36	January 1	@ Baltimore	112–116	John Tresvant (21)	10–26
37	January 2	N San Francisco	136–113	Kojis, Scott (16)	10–27
38	January 5	N Cincinnati	103–117	Ray Scott (26)	10–28
39	January 6	N Cincinnati	97–109	Eddie Miles (20)	10–29
40	January 7	St. Louis	97–137	Ray Scott (25)	11–29
41	January 9	Los Angeles	111–98	Barnhill, Van Arsdale (16)	11–30
42	January 12	Philadelphia	111–129	Dave DeBusschere (41)	12–30
43	January 15	Baltimore	117–122	Tom Van Arsdale (29)	13–30
44	January 16	@ Cincinnati	106–108	Eddie Miles (23)	13–31
45	January 18	N Boston	116–115	Eddie Miles (32)	14–31
46	January 19	N Philadelphia	110–93	Ray Scott (23)	14–32
47	January 20	N St. Louis	103–92	Tom Van Arsdale (19)	14–33
48	January 21	St. Louis	108–117	Ray Scott (32)	15–33
49	January 25	@ New York	100–115	Eddie Miles (28)	15–34
50	January 26	Los Angeles	126–110	Joe Strawder (22)	15–35
51	January 27	N Boston	112–131	Dave DeBusschere (32)	15–36
52	January 28	@ Boston	108–105	Joe Strawder (29)	16–36
53	January 30	@ Philadelphia	98–117	Dave DeBusschere (18)	16–37
54	February 1	N Boston	81–100	Eddie Miles (22)	16–38
55	February 2	Boston	93–99	Joe Strawder (20)	17–38
56	February 4	New York	115–113	Eddie Miles (26)	17–39
57	February 7	N Cincinnati	124–118	Dave DeBusschere (29)	18–39
58	February 8	N San Francisco	113–103	Eddie Miles (28)	18–40
59	February 9	Philadelphia	108–91	Ray Scott (26)	18–41
60	February 11	N New York	122–107	Joe Strawder (25)	18–42
61	February 12	@ Cincinnati	116–143	Ray Scott (29)	18–43
62	February 14	N Philadelphia	149–123	Ray Scott (21)	18–44
63	February 15	@ Baltimore	105–114	Dave DeBusschere (26)	18–45
64	February 18	New York	118–120	Eddie Miles (30)	19–45
65	February 20	Cincinnati	133–129	Ray Scott (33)	19–46
66	February 22	N Philadelphia	117–112	Eddie Miles (21)	19–47
67	February 23	N New York	100–98	DeBusschere, Miles (17)	19–48
68	February 26	Los Angeles	131–118	Eddie Miles (31)	19–49
69	February 27	@ St. Louis	114–125	Eddie Miles (24)	19–50
70	February 28	N St. Louis	108–103	Ray Scott (29)	19–51
71	March 1	N Baltimore	122–110	Eddie Miles (28)	20–51
72	March 2	San Francisco	118–131	Ray Scott (27)	21–51
73	March 4	N New York	121–119	Dave DeBusschere (29)	21–52
74	March 6	Cincinnati	137–125	John Barnhill (20)	21–53
75	March 11	@ Los Angeles	116–114	Chico Vaughn (18)	22–53
76	March 13	N San Francisco	121–119	Ron Reed (17)	22–54
77	March 15	@ Los Angeles	108–135	John Tresvant (22)	22–55
78	March 17	Boston	128–103	Ray Scott (26)	22–56
79	March 19	@ St. Louis	112–115	Ray Scott (20)	22–57
80	March 20	St. Louis	121–117	Dave DeBusschere (31)	22–58

== Awards and records ==
- Tom Van Arsdale, NBA All-Rookie Team 1st Team
