= Eddie Miles =

American basketball player (born 1940)

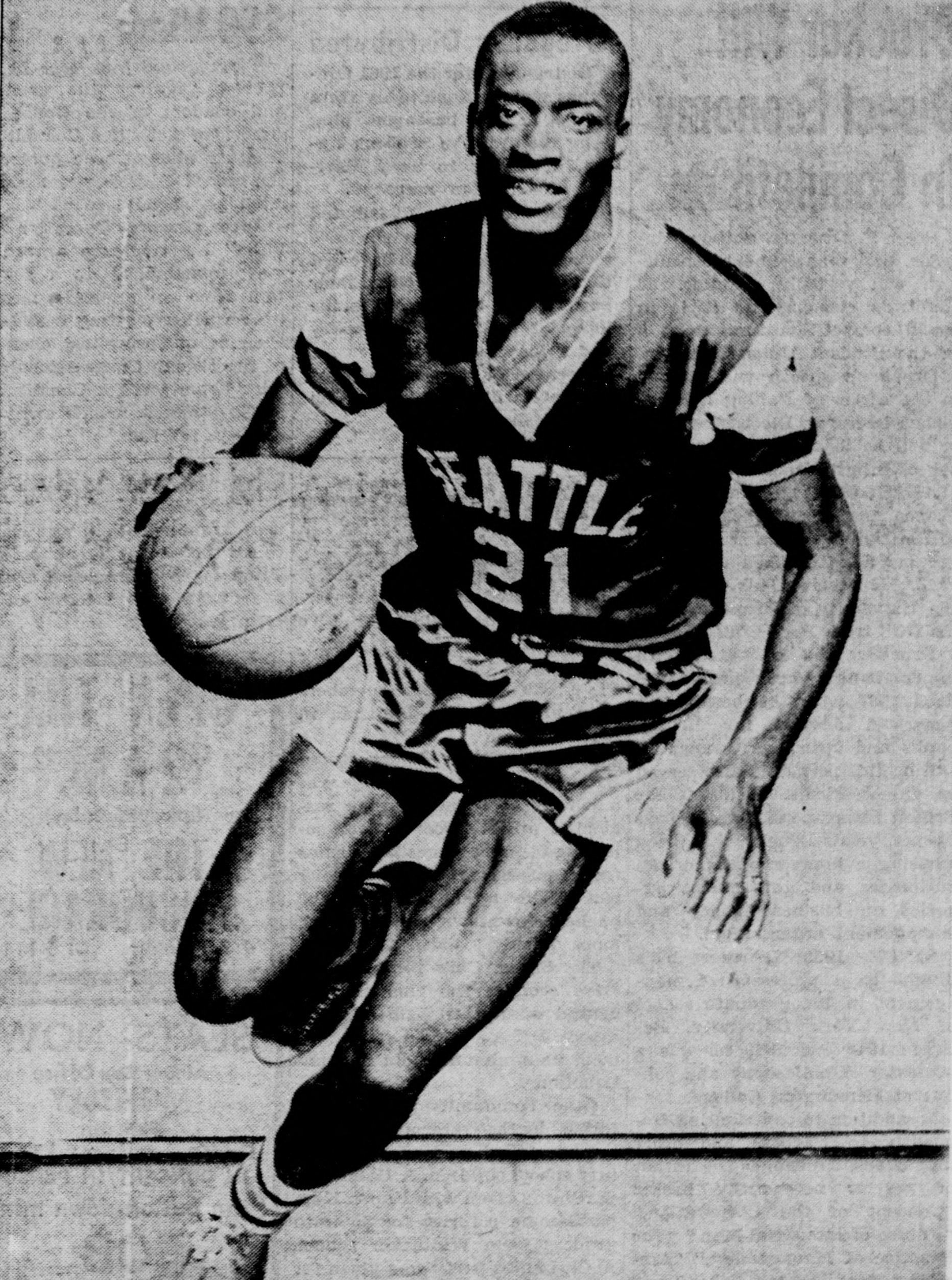
- Miles, circa 1961

Personal information
- Born: July 5, 1940 (age 86) North Little Rock, Arkansas, U.S.
- Listed height: 6 ft 4 in (1.93 m)
- Listed weight: 195 lb (88 kg)

Career information
- High school: Scipio A. Jones (North Little Rock, Arkansas)
- College: Seattle (1960–1963)
- NBA draft: 1963: 1st round, 4th overall pick
- Drafted by: Detroit Pistons
- Playing career: 1963–1972
- Position: Point guard / shooting guard
- Number: 14, 15, 42

Career history
- 1963–1970: Detroit Pistons
- 1970–1971: Baltimore Bullets
- 1971–1972: New York Knicks

Career highlights
- NBA All-Star (1966); Second-team All-American – NEA (1963); Third-team All-American – AP, UPI (1963); No. 20 retired by Seattle Redhawks

Career NBA statistics
- Points: 8,120 (13.4 ppg)
- Rebounds: 1,860 (3.1 rpg)
- Assists: 1,225 (2.0 apg)
- Stats at NBA.com
- Stats at Basketball Reference

Edward Miles Jr. (born July 5, 1940) is a retired American basketball player. His shooting ability was such that he was known as "The Man With the Golden Arm". He played in the National Basketball Association (NBA) for nine seasons, with the Detroit Pistons, Baltimore Bullets, and New York Knicks. He was the fourth overall pick in the 1963 NBA draft. Miles was selected to play in the 1966 NBA All-Star Game and led the West team in scoring. He played in 605 regular season games during his NBA career, averaging 13.4 points per game.

As a collegiate basketball player, Miles was on the Seattle University Chieftans (now Redhawks) varsity team from 1960 to 1963. He led Seattle in scoring all three seasons, and was a three-time first-team All-Pacific Coast selection. As a senior, Miles was named a second-team All-American by the Newspaper Enterprise Association and third-team All-American by the Associated Press and United Press International. He has been inducted into the Seattle University Athletics Hall of Fame, and Seattle University has retired his No. 20.

== Early life ==
Miles was born on July 5, 1940, in North Little Rock, Arkansas. He was a graduate of Scipio A. Jones High School, in North Little Rock. He averaged 18, 25, 30 and 32 points per game, respectively, in his four years as a varsity high school player, and he led Jones to four state championships. In 1959, he led the team to the finals of the national black high school tournament.

Miles was a two-time All-American in high school, four-time All-State selection, and was recruited by 50 colleges. He chose to attend Seattle University because of his admiration for its alumnus Elgin Baylor (1958), and because Baylor had called Miles to recruit him to Seattle.

== College career ==
Miles was nicknamed "The Man with the Golden Arm" by Seattle's sports information director Bill Sears, because of his shooting prowess. Miles played three varsity seasons for the Seattle Redhawks and averaged over 20 points per game all three seasons. Seattle had a 57–22 record during those three seasons and went to the NCAA University Division basketball tournament all three years; losing in close games all three times in the first round of the West Regional tournament (by two points in one game, and four points in two other games).

As a sophomore (1960–61), Miles led the team with a 20.9 points per game average, while also averaging 5.9 rebounds per game. Seattle had an 18–8 record under coach Vincent Cazzetta and was selected to play in the 1961 NCAA University Division basketball tournament. They lost to Arizona State in the first round of the West Regional tournament, 72–70, on a last second shot. Miles had 24 points in that game. United Press International (UPI) selected Miles first-team All-Pacific Coast.

As a junior (1961–62), Miles averaged a team-leading 22.3 points per game, along with 5.3 rebounds per game. His Seattle teammates that year and his senior year included future NBA player and teammate John Tresvant. Seattle was 18–9 that season, and was invited to play in the 1962 NCAA University Division basketball tournament. They again lost a close game in the first round of the West Regional tournament, 69–65, to Oregon State. Miles had 26 points and six rebounds in that game. United Press International named Miles first-team All-Pacific Coast again.

Miles ranked seventh nationally in scoring during his senior year (1962–63), with a 25.8 points per game average. In addition to leading Seattle in scoring for a third consecutive season, Miles also averaged 6.5 rebounds per game. As a senior, the Newspaper Enterprise Association (NEA) named Miles a second-team All-American. The Associated Press (AP) named Miles All-Coast and a third-team All-American. United Press International also named him a third-team All-American, and first-team All-Pacific Coast for the third consecutive season.

Seattle had its best record during Miles' tenure, 21–6, in 1962–63. Seattle was invited to play in the 1963 NCAA University Division basketball tournament. For the third consecutive year Seattle lost a close game in the first round of the West Regional tournament; once more losing to Oregon State (70–66). Miles had 28 points and five rebounds.

Miles led Seattle in scoring all three years and remains Seattle's third all-time leading scorer with a 23.1 points per game average; Baylor being number one at 31.1 points per game. Miles is second all-time for Seattle in total career points (1,823), and is fourth all-time in free thrown percentage (.757) (through 2025–26). Miles holds Seattle's career record with 1,538 field goal attempts.

== Professional career ==
A 6 ft 4 in (1.93 m) guard, Miles was selected by the Detroit Pistons with the fourth pick of the 1963 NBA draft. He played nine NBA seasons with Detroit, the Baltimore Bullets, and the New York Knicks. In February 1971, he suffered an Achilles tendon injury that required surgery, from which he was not fully recovered over a year later; shortening his career.

=== Detroit Pistons ===
As a Pistons' rookie, Miles only played 13.5 minutes a game and averaged 5.4 points per game. His skill set was a poor match for coach Charley Wolff's offensive scheme. Miles play and numbers improved significantly when Wolff was fired in November 1964 after 11 games, and 24-year old Pistons' forward Dave DeBusschere was named head coach; the youngest in NBA history. Miles averaged 13.7 points and over 27 minutes per game by the end of the 1964–65 season.

Miles's best NBA seasons came in Detroit from 1965 to 1968, when he respectively averaged 19.6, 17.6 and 18.5 points per game. He represented the Pistons at the 1966 NBA All-Star Game, scoring 17 points, high on the West team. Although his scoring average fell to 13.3 points per game in the 1968–69 season, he never averaged less than 13.3 points per game for the Pistons after his rookie season.

Miles' only playoff appearances with the Pistons came in 1968, in the Eastern Division semifinals against the Boston Celtics. The Pistons lost the series in six games to the eventual 1968 NBA champion Celtics. Miles appeared in all six games, playing nearly 33 minutes per game. He averaged 14.5 points, 3.5 rebounds, and 2.5 assists per game.

Miles played in 44 games for the Pistons during the 1969–70 season, averaging 28.3 minutes, 13.5 points, 3.9 rebounds, and 1.9 assists per game, before being traded to the Baltimore Bullets. After not having any serious injuries in college or during his first seven years in the NBA, Miles had developed some left knee problems before being traded to the Bullets and missed some games.

In 479 regular season games with the Pistons over seven seasons, Miles averaged 27.9 minutes, 14.9 points, 3.4 rebounds, and 2.2 assists per game.

=== Baltimore Bullets and New York Knicks ===
Miles was traded from the Pistons to the Bullets for Bob Quick on February 1, 1970, in a transaction that also involved both teams exchanging selections in the 1970 NBA draft, with Baltimore receiving a fourth-round pick (54th overall–Bill Stricker) and Detroit a second-rounder (32nd overall–Ken Warzynski). Miles twisted his left knee during his first game with the Bullets, and played in only three games for the Bullets during the regular season. He was placed in a cast less than two weeks after joining the team, in hopes that he could rehabilitate the leg injury in time to play in the 1970 playoffs. He was able to return and play five games in the 1970 Eastern Division semifinals against the New York Knicks; the Bullets losing the series in seven games. Miles averaged only 12.6 minutes, 1.6 points, and one rebound per game during that series.

Miles played in 63 games for the Bullets during the 1970–71 season as a reserve guard and forward, averaging 24.5 minutes, 9.9 points, 2.7 rebounds, and 1.7 assists per game. Miles suffered a torn Achilles tendon in a late February 1971 game that required immediate surgery and ended his season. The Bullets defeated the New York Knicks 4–3 to win the 1971 Eastern Conference Finals, but Miles did not play in that series because of his injury. He was waived by the Bullets in late September 1971, before the start of the 1971–72 season.

The Knicks acquired Miles in late October 1971 when two of their guards were unavailable to play; Mike Riordan with a broken wrist and Walt Frazier who had been hospitalized. Miles played in 42 games for the Knicks during his final NBA season, averaging only 4.7 minutes a game. It was reported in late March 1972, over one year after his surgery, that Miles still had a noticeable limp when he was used in games. Miles played in nine playoff games for the Knicks in 1972, only averaging about two minutes per game. This included three games against the Bullets. The Knicks waived Miles in mid-September 1972.

Miles played in 605 regular season games, averaging 13.4 points per game in his NBA career. He found the defense of Hall of Fame guard Lenny Wilkens particularly difficult.

== Coaching ==
Since retiring as a player, Miles has served as a coach at the college and high school levels, and has worked as a private basketball trainer. During the 1972–73 season, while living in Severna Park, Maryland, Miles was a physical education teacher and basketball coach at Annapolis High School in Annapolis, Maryland. In June 1978, Miles was hired as an assistant coach at Seattle University, where he worked during Seattle's last two seasons as an NCAA Division I school (1978 to 1980). He was later an assistant coach to his son at Tyee High School in Washington.

== Legacy and honors ==
In 2011, Miles was inducted into the Seattle University Athletics Hall of Fame. Seattle University has also retired Miles' No. 20 jersey. Miles was inducted into the Arkansas Sports Hall of Fame in 1989. He received the Seattle University Alumni Award in 2020.

== Personal life ==
Miles worked as a government accountant and as a financial services agent. He worked as a local government accountant in Maryland for four years during the 1970s, until being hired as an assistant coach at Seattle University in June 1978. As of 2024, he has been married for 64 years to Carolyn Miles, with five children and six grandchildren.

== NBA career statistics ==
Legend
| GP | Games played | GS | Games started | MPG | Minutes per game |
| FG% | Field goal percentage | 3P% | 3-point field goal percentage | FT% | Free throw percentage |
| RPG | Rebounds per game | APG | Assists per game | SPG | Steals per game |
| BPG | Blocks per game | PPG | Points per game | **Bold** | Career high |

=== Regular season ===
| Year | Team | GP | MPG | FG% | FT% | RPG | APG | PPG |
|---|---|---|---|---|---|---|---|---|
| 1963–64 | Detroit | 60 | 13.5 | .353 | .713 | 1.6 | 1.0 | 5.4 |
| 1964–65 | Detroit | 76 | 27.3 | .442 | .744 | 3.4 | 2.1 | 13.7 |
| 1965–66 | Detroit | 80 | **34.9** | .447 | .741 | 3.8 | **2.8** | **19.6** |
| 1966–67 | Detroit | **81** | 29.9 | .427 | .772 | 3.7 | 2.2 | 17.6 |
| 1967–68 | Detroit | 76 | 30.3 | .475 | .764 | 3.5 | **2.8** | 18.5 |
| 1968–69 | Detroit | 80 | 28.2 | .449 | .667 | 3.5 | 2.3 | 13.3 |
| 1969–70 | Detroit | 44 | 28.3 | .435 | .765 | **3.9** | 1.9 | 13.5 |
| 1969–70 | Baltimore | 3 | 17.3 | **.700** | .600 | 1.3 | 1.3 | 5.7 |
| 1970–71 | Baltimore | 63 | 24.5 | .426 | .803 | 2.7 | 1.6 | 9.9 |
| 1971–72 | New York | 42 | 4.7 | .359 | **.889** | .4 | .4 | 1.5 |
| Career | | 605 | 25.9 | .440 | .747 | 3.1 | 2.0 | 13.4 |
| All-Star | | 1 | 28.0 | .500 | .200 | 1.0 | 0.0 | 17.0 |

=== Playoffs ===
| Year | Team | GP | MPG | FG% | FT% | RPG | APG | PPG |
|---|---|---|---|---|---|---|---|---|
| 1968 | Detroit | 6 | **32.8** | **.411** | .750 | **3.7** | **2.5** | **14.5** |
| 1970 | Baltimore | 5 | 12.6 | .400 | – | 1.0 | .0 | 1.6 |
| 1972 | New York | **9** | 1.9 | .000 | **.800** | .9 | .1 | .4 |
| Career | | 20 | 13.9 | .387 | .765 | 1.8 | .8 | 5.0 |
