= Donnis Butcher =

American basketball player (1936–2012)

Personal information
- Born: February 6, 1936 Williamsport, Kentucky, U.S.
- Died: October 8, 2012 (aged 76) Hartland, Michigan, U.S.
- Listed height: 6 ft 2 in (1.88 m)
- Listed weight: 200 lb (91 kg)

Career information
- High school: Meade (Williamsport, Kentucky)
- College: Pikeville
- NBA draft: 1961: 7th round, 60th overall pick
- Drafted by: New York Knicks
- Playing career: 1961–1966
- Position: Point guard / shooting guard
- Number: 19, 24

Career history

Playing
- 1961–1963: New York Knicks
- 1963–1966: Detroit Pistons

Coaching
- 1967–1968: Detroit Pistons

Career statistics
- Points: 1,696 (6.1 ppg)
- Rebounds: 821 (2.9 rpg)
- Assists: 585 (2.1 apg)
- Stats at NBA.com
- Stats at Basketball Reference

Donnis "Donnie" Butcher (February 8, 1936 – October 8, 2012) was an American basketball player and coach. A point guard and shooting guard from Pikeville College in Kentucky, Butcher was selected by the New York Knicks in the seventh round of the 1961 NBA draft. He played five seasons in the NBA, playing for both the Knicks and the Detroit Pistons. He also coached the Pistons from March 1967 to December 1968, tallying a regular season record of 52–60 and a playoff record of 2–4.

== Early years ==
Butcher was born and raised in Williamsport, Kentucky. He attended Meade High School in Williamsport and Pikeville College in Pikeville, Kentucky. He played basketball for Pikeville where he was the only unanimous pick on the All-Kentucky Intercollegiate Athletic Conference basketball team in both 1960 and 1961.

== NBA career ==
Butcher was selected by the New York Knicks with the 60th pick in the 1961 NBA draft. He appeared in 47 games for the Knicks during the 1961–62 season, scoring 138 points with 51 assists and 79 rebounds. The following year, he appeared in 68 games, scoring 475 points with 138 assists and 180 rebounds.

In December 1963, the Knicks traded Butcher to the Detroit Pistons. Butcher became a starter for the Pistons and had career-bests during the 1963–64 season with 1,971 minutes played, 563 points scored, 329 rebounds, and 244 assists. He also ranked 10th in the NBA in assists per 36 minutes during the 1963–64 season. He continued to play for the Pistons throughout the 1965–66 season.

In five NBA seasons, Butcher appeared in 279 games and tallied 1,696 points, 821 rebounds, and 585 assists.

== Coaching career ==
In March 1967, with eight games remaining in the 1966–67 Detroit Pistons season, Butcher was hired as interim coach of the Detroit Pistons in March 1967. He took over as regular head coach for the 1967–68 season, leading the team to a 40–42 and a spot in the division semifinals where they lost to the Boston Celtics. He was fired in early December 1968 after the team compiled a 52–60 record, and 2–4 in the playoffs, as the Pistons' coach. He was retained on the Pistons' staff as a scout until May 1969.

== Later years ==
Butcher later returned to a scouting job with the Pistons in the 1970s. He later became a representative for Converse responsible for conducting basketball clinics and signing athletes to shoe contracts.

Butcher died in October 2012, or month after being diagnosed with and advanced stage of kidney cancer.

== Career playing statistics ==
Legend
GP	Games played	GS	Games started	MPG	Minutes per game
FG%	Field goal percentage	3P%	3-point field goal percentage	FT%	Free throw percentage
RPG	Rebounds per game	APG	Assists per game	SPG	Steals per game
BPG	Blocks per game	PPG	Points per game	**Bold**	Career high

=== NBA ===
==== Regular season ====
Year	Team	GP	MPG	FG%	FT%	RPG	APG	PPG
1961–62	New York	47	10.2	.310	.609	1.7	1.1	2.9
1962–63	New York	68	17.5	.406	**.675**	2.6	2.0	7.0
1963–64	New York	26	16.1	.322	.636	2.6	2.5	4.5
1963–64	Detroit	52	**29.9**	.421	.616	**5.0**	**3.4**	**8.6**
1964–65	Detroit	**71**	16.3	.405	.618	2.8	1.7	5.8
1965–66	Detroit	15	19.0	**.469**	.529	2.2	2.0	7.2
Career		279	18.2	.397	.629	2.9	2.1	6.1

== Head coaching record ==
Legend
Regular season	G	Games coached	W	Games won	L	Games lost	W–L %	Win–loss %
Playoffs	PG	Playoff games	PW	Playoff wins	PL	Playoff losses	PW–L %	Playoff win–loss %

=== NBA ===
Team	Year	G	W	L	W–L%	Finish	PG	PW	PL	PW–L%	Result
Detroit	1966–67	8	2	6	.250	5th in Western	—	—	—	—	Missed playoffs
Detroit	1967–68	82	40	42	.488	4th in Eastern	6	2	4	.333	Lost in Division semifinals
Detroit	1969–70	22	10	12	.455	(fired)	—	—	—	—	
Career		112	52	60	.464		6	2	4	.333	
