= 1967–68 Detroit Pistons season =

NBA team season

- Head coach: Donnie Butcher
- General manager: Ed Coil
- Owner: Fred Zollner
- Arena: Cobo Arena

Results
- Record: 40–42 (.488)
- Place: Division: 4th (Eastern)
- Playoff finish: East Division Semifinals (eliminated 2–4)
- Stats at Basketball Reference

Local media
- Television: WJBK
- Radio: WXYZ

The 1967–68 Detroit Pistons season was the Detroit Pistons' 20th season in the NBA and 11th season in the city of Detroit. The team played at Cobo Arena in Detroit.

Expansion in the NBA, with new teams in San Diego and Seattle, forced the league to move to the deeper Eastern Conference. Still, Detroit improved significantly, finishing 40-42 (.488), 4th in the Eastern Division. The team advanced to the playoffs for the first time since 1963, losing in the division semi-finals to the eventual NBA champion Boston Celtics 4–2. Detroit was led on the season by guard Dave Bing (27.1 ppg, 6.4 apg, NBA All-Star) and forward Dave DeBusschere (17.9 ppg, 13.5 rpg, NBA All-Star).

== Roster ==
Detroit Pistons roster
Players

Pos.	No.	Player	Height	Weight	DOB	From
G	21	Dave Bing	6 ft 3 in (1.91 m)	180 lb (82 kg)		Syracuse
SF	12	George Carter	6 ft 4 in (1.93 m)	210 lb (95 kg)		St. Bonaventure
C	17	Len Chappell	6 ft 8 in (2.03 m)	240 lb (109 kg)		Wake Forest
F	22	Dave DeBusschere	6 ft 6 in (1.98 m)	220 lb (100 kg)		Detroit Mercy
SF	43	Terry Dischinger	6 ft 7 in (2.01 m)	189 lb (86 kg)		Purdue
F	44	Sonny Dove	6 ft 7 in (2.01 m)	198 lb (90 kg)		St. John's
C	23	Jim Fox	6 ft 10 in (2.08 m)	230 lb (104 kg)		South Carolina
F	5	Happy Hairston	6 ft 7 in (2.01 m)	255 lb (116 kg)		NYU
G	10	Paul Long	6 ft 2 in (1.88 m)	180 lb (82 kg)		Wake Forest
G	14	Eddie Miles	6 ft 4 in (1.93 m)	195 lb (88 kg)		Seattle
C	20	George Patterson	6 ft 8 in (2.03 m)	230 lb (104 kg)		Toledo
C	16	Joe Strawder	6 ft 10 in (2.08 m)	235 lb (107 kg)		Bradley
F	24	Jimmy Walker	6 ft 3 in (1.91 m)	195 lb (88 kg)		Providence

Coaches
Head coach
- Donnie Butcher

Legend
- (DP) Unsigned draft pick
- (FA) Free agent
- (S) Suspended
- Injured

== Regular season ==
=== Season standings ===
Eastern Division	W	L	PCT	GB	Home	Road	Neutral	Div
x-Philadelphia 76ers	62	20	.756	–	27–8	26–12	9–0	29–11
x-Boston Celtics	54	28	.659	8	28–9	21–16	5–3	24–16
x-New York Knicks	43	39	.524	19	20–17	21–16	2–6	19–21
x-Detroit Pistons	40	42	.488	22	21–11	12–23	7–8	15–25
Cincinnati Royals	39	43	.476	23	18–12	13–23	8–8	18–22
Baltimore Bullets	36	46	.439	26	17–19	12–23	7–4	15–25

x – clinched playoff spot

=== Game log ===
1967–68 Game log
#	Date	Opponent	Score	High points	Record
1	October 17	Cincinnati	108–131	Dave Bing (35)	1–0
2	October 21	@ Philadelphia	111–116	Dave Bing (28)	1–1
3	October 24	N Philadelphia	124–102	John Tresvant (19)	1–2
4	October 25	Chicago	99–107	Dave Bing (31)	2–2
5	October 27	Boston	128–109	Dave DeBusschere (25)	2–3
6	October 28	@ New York	111–98	John Tresvant (25)	3–3
7	November 1	San Francisco	137–132	Dave Bing (32)	3–4
8	November 3	@ Baltimore	115–113	Dave Bing (42)	4–4
9	November 4	Baltimore	118–127	Dave Bing (38)	5–4
10	November 8	New York	108–110	Dave Bing (24)	6–4
11	November 9	N Seattle	118–119	Dave Bing (39)	7–4
12	November 10	St. Louis	143–140 (OT)	Dave DeBusschere (35)	7–5
13	November 14	N St. Louis	107–124	Terry Dischinger (39)	8–5
14	November 15	Philadelphia	120–123	Dave Bing (40)	9–5
15	November 18	@ Chicago	130–132	Eddie Miles (33)	9–6
16	November 19	@ Seattle	130–132 (OT)	Dave Bing (31)	9–7
17	November 20	N Seattle	118–120	Eddie Miles (38)	10–7
18	November 21	@ San Francisco	98–124	Terry Dischinger (19)	10–8
19	November 23	@ Los Angeles	120–132	Eddie Miles (23)	10–9
20	November 24	San Diego	122–130	Dave DeBusschere (35)	11–9
21	November 25	@ Cincinnati	133–123	Dave Bing (29)	12–9
22	November 28	@ Boston	111–118	Dave Bing (28)	12–10
23	November 29	Los Angeles	123–127	Bing, Miles (32)	13–10
24	December 2	Boston	107–112	Dave Bing (38)	14–10
25	December 5	N San Diego	110–111	Dave Bing (23)	15–10
26	December 6	Chicago	121–135	Dave Bing (40)	16–10
27	December 8	Los Angeles	115–103	Dave Bing (25)	16–11
28	December 9	@ New York	124–121	Dave Bing (32)	17–11
29	December 12	@ Baltimore	117–140	Tom Van Arsdale (21)	17–12
30	December 13	New York	117–129	Dave Bing (43)	18–12
31	December 15	N Cincinnati	130–147	John Tresvant (27)	18–13
32	December 16	Cincinnati	122–110	Dave Bing (24)	18–14
33	December 17	@ San Diego	115–117	Eddie Miles (33)	18–15
34	December 18	N Seattle	122–140	Len Chappell (30)	19–15
35	December 20	@ San Francisco	109–113	Dave Bing (28)	19–16
36	December 22	@ Los Angeles	105–133	Len Chappell (28)	19–17
37	December 23	@ San Diego	123–119	Dave DeBusschere (33)	20–17
38	December 26	St. Louis	110–127	Dave Bing (39)	21–17
39	December 29	N St. Louis	122–111	Dave DeBusschere (23)	21–18
40	December 30	N Philadelphia	122–107	Eddie Miles (27)	21–19
41	January 2	N Baltimore	114–113	Dave Bing (31)	22–19
42	January 5	Cincinnati	141–142 (OT)	Bing, Miles (34)	23–19
43	January 6	@ New York	101–118	Bing, Dischinger (16)	23–20
44	January 9	@ San Francisco	118–102	Dave Bing (33)	24–20
45	January 10	@ San Diego	118–122	Dave DeBusschere (27)	24–21
46	January 12	@ Boston	126–148	Dave Bing (33)	24–22
47	January 13	Philadelphia	115–106	Dave Bing (29)	24–23
48	January 17	San Francisco	109–117	Dave Bing (31)	25–23
49	January 19	Seattle	119–133	Dave Bing (36)	26–23
50	January 20	@ Cincinnati	120–128	Dave Bing (30)	26–24
51	January 21	New York	115–103	Eddie Miles (25)	26–25
52	January 25	Philadelphia	123–108	Eddie Miles (26)	26–26
53	January 27	Los Angeles	119–125	Dave DeBusschere (33)	27–26
54	January 30	N Cincinnati	101–121	Dave Bing (34)	27–27
55	January 31	@ Baltimore	108–113	Dave Bing (41)	27–28
56	February 2	@ Philadelphia	121–131	Eddie Miles (34)	27–29
57	February 4	Baltimore	115–117	Dave Bing (31)	28–29
58	February 6	N San Diego	93–120	Dave Bing (35)	29–29
59	February 8	@ Chicago	110–131	Dave Bing (22)	29–30
60	February 9	@ Boston	100–107	Dave Bing (28)	29–31
61	February 10	Baltimore	114–109	Dave Bing (27)	29–32
62	February 13	Boston	127–115	Eddie Miles (29)	29–33
63	February 14	N Boston	96–118	Jimmy Walker (19)	29–34
64	February 18	San Francisco	104–123	Happy Hairston (25)	30–34
65	February 20	N Chicago	121–124 (OT)	Dave Bing (32)	30–35
66	February 22	N St. Louis	151–128	Dave Bing (24)	30–36
67	February 23	@ Philadelphia	117–138	Dave Bing (29)	30–37
68	February 24	@ Baltimore	132–140	Dave Bing (37)	30–38
69	February 25	New York	124–115	Hairston, Walker (23)	30–39
70	March 1	St. Louis	121–131	Dave Bing (32)	31–39
71	March 2	@ New York	107–133	Eddie Miles (19)	31–40
72	March 3	Chicago	123–134	Dave Bing (34)	32–40
73	March 5	@ Chicago	121–119	Happy Hairston (30)	33–40
74	March 6	San Diego	118–140	Eddie Miles (27)	34–40
75	March 8	@ Cincinnati	129–118	Bing, Miles (31)	35–40
76	March 10	@ St. Louis	133–121	Eddie Miles (35)	36–40
77	March 12	Seattle	123–139	Eddie Miles (39)	37–40
78	March 15	@ San Francisco	122–118	Dave DeBusschere (30)	38–40
79	March 16	@ Los Angeles	108–135	Bing, Dischinger (16)	38–41
80	March 17	@ Los Angeles	116–120	Dave Bing (45)	38–42
81	March 18	@ Seattle	88–82	Jimmy Walker (21)	39–42
82	March 20	@ Boston	125–116	Dave DeBusschere (32)	40–42

== Playoffs ==
1968 playoff game log
Division Semifinals: 2–4 (home: 1–2; road: 1–2)

Game	Date	Team	Score	High points	High rebounds	High assists	Location Attendance	Series
1	March 24	@ Boston	L 116–123	Dave Bing (30)	Dave DeBusschere (24)	Dave Bing (6)	Boston Garden; 7,591	0–1
2	March 25	Boston	W 126–116	Dave Bing (24)	Joe Strawder (14)	Dave Bing (5)	Cobo Arena; 10,109	1–1
3	March 27	@ Boston	W 109–98	Dave Bing (27)	Dave DeBusschere (17)	Dave Bing (7)	Boston Garden; 8,429	2–1
4	March 28	Boston	L 110–135	Dave Bing (26)	Dave DeBusschere (10)	Dave Bing (6)	Cobo Arena; 11,294	2–2
5	March 31	@ Boston	L 96–110	Dave DeBusschere (26)	Dave DeBusschere (23)	Eddie Miles (4)	Boston Garden; 8,093	2–3
6	April 1	Boston	L 103–111	Dave Bing (44)	Dave DeBusschere (14)	Dave Bing (4)	Cobo Arena; 9,483	2–4

1968 schedule

== Awards and records ==
- Dave Bing, All-NBA First Team
