= Joe Strawder =

American basketball player

Personal information
- Born: September 21, 1940 Belle Glade, Florida, U.S.
- Died: August 25, 2005 (aged 64)
- Listed height: 6 ft 10 in (2.08 m)
- Listed weight: 235 lb (107 kg)

Career information
- High school: Belle Glade (Belle Glade, Florida)
- College: Bradley (1961–1964)
- NBA draft: 1964: 4th round, 34th overall pick
- Drafted by: Boston Celtics
- Playing career: 1964–1968
- Position: Center
- Number: 16

Career history
- 1964–1965: Camden Bullets
- 1965–1968: Detroit Pistons

Career NBA statistics
- Points: 1,977 (8.6 ppg)
- Rebounds: 2,296 (9.9 rpg)
- Assists: 245 (1.1 apg)
- Stats at NBA.com
- Stats at Basketball Reference

Joe Tom Strawder (September 21, 1940 – August 24, 2005) was an American professional basketball player born in Belle Glade, Florida.

A 6'10" center from Bradley University where he played with Levern Tart, Strawder played three seasons (1965–1968) in the National Basketball Association as a member of the Detroit Pistons. He averaged 8.6 and 9.9 rebounds in his career.

== Career statistics ==
Legend
GP	Games played	GS	Games started	MPG	Minutes per game
FG%	Field goal percentage	3P%	3-point field goal percentage	FT%	Free throw percentage
RPG	Rebounds per game	APG	Assists per game	SPG	Steals per game
BPG	Blocks per game	PPG	Points per game	**Bold**	Career high

=== NBA ===
==== Regular season ====
Year	Team	GP	MPG	FG%	FT%	RPG	APG	PPG
1965–66	Detroit	**79**	27.6	.408	.688	**10.4**	1.0	8.6
1966–67	Detroit	**79**	27.3	.426	**.718**	10.0	1.0	**9.5**
1967–68	Detroit	73	**27.8**	**.452**	.647	9.4	**1.2**	7.5
Career		231	27.6	.426	.686	9.9	1.1	8.6

=== Playoffs ===
Year	Team	GP	MPG	FG%	FT%	RPG	APG	PPG
1968	Detroit	6	29.5	.333	.636	10.8	1.5	7.0
