= 1966–67 Detroit Pistons season =

NBA team season

- Head coach: Dave DeBusschere; Donnie Butcher
- General manager: Ed Coil
- Owner: Fred Zollner
- Arena: Cobo Arena

Results
- Record: 30–51 (.370)
- Place: Division: 5th (Western)
- Playoff finish: Did not qualify
- Stats at Basketball Reference

The 1966–67 Detroit Pistons season was the Detroit Pistons' 19th season in the NBA and tenth season in the city of Detroit. The team played at Cobo Arena in Detroit.

The team struggled to a 30-51 (.370) record, 5th in the Western Division. The team removed the coach role from 26 year-old player-coach Dave DeBusschere as the season was coming to an end, even as DeBusschere led the team (18.2 ppg, 11.8 rpg, NBA All-Star) on the court. The Pistons added rookie Dave Bing with the 2nd choice in the first round of the 1966 NBA draft and Bing contributed immediately with 20 ppg, 4.1 apg, was named to the NBA All-Rookie Team and honored as the NBA Rookie of the Year at the start of his Hall of Fame career.

== Roster ==
1966–67 Detroit Pistons roster
Players

Pos.	No.	Player	Height	Weight	DOB	From
G	21	Dave Bing	6 ft 3 in (1.91 m)	180 lb (82 kg)	1943–11–24	Syracuse
F	22	Dave DeBusschere	6 ft 6 in (1.98 m)	220 lb (100 kg)	1940–10–16	Detroit Mercy
C	19	Reggie Harding	7 ft 0 in (2.13 m)	249 lb (113 kg)	1942–05–04	Nashville Christian Institute (TN)
F	12	Wayne Hightower	6 ft 8 in (2.03 m)	192 lb (87 kg)	1940–01–14	Kansas
F	20	Bob Hogsett	6 ft 7 in (2.01 m)	230 lb (104 kg)	1941–01–29	Kansas
G	14	Eddie Miles	6 ft 4 in (1.93 m)	195 lb (88 kg)	1940–07–05	Seattle
F	25	Dorie Murrey	6 ft 8 in (2.03 m)	215 lb (98 kg)	1943–09–07	Detroit Mercy
F	20	Ron Reed	6 ft 5 in (1.96 m)	205 lb (93 kg)	1942–11–02	Notre Dame
C	16	Joe Strawder	6 ft 10 in (2.08 m)	235 lb (107 kg)	1940–09–21	Bradley
F	23	John Tresvant	6 ft 7 in (2.01 m)	215 lb (98 kg)	1939–11–06	Seattle
G	5	Tom Van Arsdale	6 ft 5 in (1.96 m)	202 lb (92 kg)	1943–02–22	Indiana
G	10	Chico Vaughn	6 ft 2 in (1.88 m)	190 lb (86 kg)	1940–02–19	Southern Illinois

Coaches
Head coach
- Donnie Butcher

Legend
- (DP) Unsigned draft pick
- (FA) Free agent
- (S) Suspended
- Injured

Roster
Updated: 1967–02–17

== Regular season ==
=== Season standings ===
Western Division	W	L	PCT	GB	Home	Road	Neutral	Div
x-San Francisco Warriors	44	37	.543	–	18–10	11–19	15–8	24–12
x-St. Louis Hawks	39	42	.481	5	18–11	12–21	9–10	21–15
x-Los Angeles Lakers	36	45	.444	8	21–18	12–20	3–7	14–22
x-Chicago Bulls	33	48	.407	11	17–19	9–17	7–12	17–19
Detroit Pistons	30	51	.370	14	12–18	9–19	9–14	14–22

x – clinched playoff spot

=== Game log ===
1966–67 Game log
#	Date	Opponent	Score	High points	Record
1	October 15	@ Cincinnati	99–103	Ray Scott (26)	0–1
2	October 18	Cincinnati	112–114	Ray Scott (20)	1–1
3	October 20	St. Louis	113–105	Dave DeBusschere (32)	1–2
4	October 21	@ San Francisco	119–136	Dave Bing (25)	1–3
5	October 23	N San Francisco	110–119	Dave DeBusschere (30)	2–3
6	October 28	N Chicago	129–117	Eddie Miles (35)	3–3
7	October 29	Baltimore	97–103	Eddie Miles (26)	4–3
8	October 30	N Los Angeles	121–124	Ray Scott (29)	5–3
9	November 4	Cincinnati	120–115	Tom Van Arsdale (24)	5–4
10	November 5	@ New York	104–115	Tom Van Arsdale (17)	5–5
11	November 8	N Philadelphia	118–100	Dave Bing (21)	5–6
12	November 10	@ Los Angeles	133–132 (OT)	Dave Bing (28)	6–6
13	November 12	@ Los Angeles	88–144	Tom Van Arsdale (20)	6–7
14	November 13	@ San Francisco	96–135	Ron Reed (22)	6–8
15	November 14	@ San Francisco	104–115	Eddie Miles (18)	6–9
16	November 16	St. Louis	104–101	Joe Strawder (19)	6–10
17	November 17	N New York	108–123	Dave DeBusschere (31)	7–10
18	November 18	Los Angeles	118–121	Dave Bing (35)	8–10
19	November 19	@ St. Louis	87–105	Dave DeBusschere (16)	8–11
20	November 23	New York	100–118	Ray Scott (21)	9–11
21	November 25	Boston	105–107	Scott, Van Arsdale (18)	10–11
22	November 26	@ Philadelphia	123–131	Eddie Miles (25)	10–12
23	November 29	N Boston	104–100	Dave DeBusschere (21)	11–12
24	November 30	Philadelphia	128–119	Dave Bing (26)	11–13
25	December 2	@ Boston	119–116	Eddie Miles (27)	12–13
26	December 3	Chicago	98–104	Ray Scott (20)	13–13
27	December 6	N Boston	111–130	Eddie Miles (27)	13–14
28	December 7	New York	118–116	Eddie Miles (26)	13–15
29	December 14	N Chicago	87–93	Bing, DeBusschere (14)	13–16
30	December 16	Baltimore	121–113	Ron Reed (30)	13–17
31	December 17	N Philadelphia	120–105	Ray Scott (25)	13–18
32	December 20	N Boston	113–116 (OT)	Dave Bing (31)	13–19
33	December 23	@ Chicago	103–102	Dave DeBusschere (22)	14–19
34	December 25	@ Baltimore	129–127 (OT)	Ray Scott (34)	15–19
35	December 26	New York	114–109	Tom Van Arsdale (25)	15–20
36	December 27	@ Cincinnati	123–131	Dave Bing (28)	15–21
37	December 30	N Philadelphia	137–113	Bing, DeBusschere (18)	15–22
38	January 2	N St. Louis	122–120	DeBusschere, Miles (22)	15–23
39	January 3	N Baltimore	117–110	Dave DeBusschere (20)	16–23
40	January 4	@ Baltimore	132–126 (2OT)	Dave Bing (33)	17–23
41	January 6	Chicago	135–126	Dave Bing (27)	17–24
42	January 8	@ St. Louis	115–117	Eddie Miles (22)	17–25
43	January 13	N Baltimore	119–118	Tom Van Arsdale (22)	18–25
44	January 14	San Francisco	136–121	Dave DeBusschere (24)	18–26
45	January 15	Los Angeles	127–116	Dave Bing (31)	18–27
46	January 18	Philadelphia	113–105	Dave Bing (33)	18–28
47	January 20	@ Chicago	124–125 (OT)	Tom Van Arsdale (28)	18–29
48	January 21	@ Cincinnati	108–122	Dave Bing (23)	18–30
49	January 24	@ Chicago	108–95	Dave Bing (32)	19–30
50	January 25	Boston	112–105	Dave Bing (28)	19–31
51	January 26	N Cincinnati	118–110	Dave Bing (32)	20–31
52	January 27	@ Boston	106–112	Bing, Miles (21)	20–32
53	January 31	N San Francisco	108–106	Dave DeBusschere (29)	20–33
54	February 1	New York	101–104	Joe Strawder (20)	21–33
55	February 3	N New York	124–111	Dave Bing (31)	21–34
56	February 4	@ New York	101–102	Dave DeBusschere (26)	21–35
57	February 5	St. Louis	104–114	Dave Bing (32)	22–35
58	February 7	@ Chicago	98–90	Bing, Miles (21)	23–35
59	February 10	@ Cincinnati	104–133	Dave Bing (20)	23–36
60	February 11	Cincinnati	132–117	Eddie Miles (25)	23–37
61	February 12	San Francisco	127–134	Dave DeBusschere (27)	24–37
62	February 15	Philadelphia	127–121	Bing, Miles (25)	24–38
63	February 16	N Cincinnati	110–122	Dave Bing (21)	24–39
64	February 18	N Baltimore	118–113	Eddie Miles (34)	25–39
65	February 19	Baltimore	131–104	Tom Van Arsdale (24)	25–40
66	February 21	@ St. Louis	112–109	Eddie Miles (37)	26–40
67	February 24	Los Angeles	101–102	Eddie Miles (28)	27–40
68	February 27	N St. Louis	105–94	Eddie Miles (18)	27–41
69	February 28	N Los Angeles	119–117	Bing, Miles (22)	27–42
70	March 1	New York	101–118	Dave Bing (28)	28–42
71	March 3	N Philadelphia	129–103	John Tresvant (19)	28–43
72	March 5	@ Philadelphia	106–131	Dave DeBusschere (18)	28–44
73	March 6	N Boston	103–127	Dave Bing (21)	28–45
74	March 8	Baltimore	113–120	Dave Bing (47)	29–45
75	March 10	@ Los Angeles	103–118	Eddie Miles (24)	29–46
76	March 12	@ Los Angeles	120–104	Bing, DeBusschere (26)	30–46
77	March 13	@ San Francisco	109–135	Dave Bing (33)	30–47
78	March 15	Chicago	98–91	Dave Bing (26)	30–48
79	March 16	Boston	132–109	Wayne Hightower (18)	30–49
80	March 18	@ St. Louis	99–102	Dave Bing (17)	30–50
81	March 19	San Francisco	135–127	Dave Bing (35)	30–51

== Awards and records ==
- Dave Bing, NBA Rookie of the Year Award
- Dave Bing, NBA All-Rookie Team 1st Team
