= Bob Warlick =

American basketball player (1941–2005)

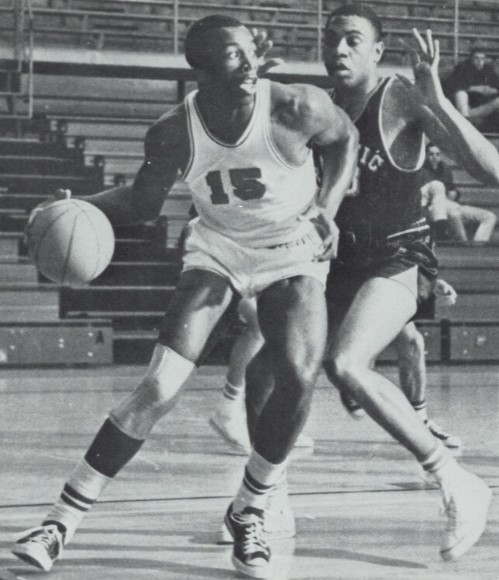
- Warlick as a senior at Pepperdine

Personal information
- Born: March 20, 1941 Hickory, North Carolina, U.S.
- Died: September 6, 2005 (aged 64) Long Beach, California, U.S.
- Listed height: 6 ft 5 in (1.96 m)
- Listed weight: 200 lb (91 kg)

Career information
- High school: Ridgeview (Hickory, North Carolina)
- College: CSU Pueblo (1959–1961); Pepperdine (1961–1963)
- NBA draft: 1963: undrafted
- Playing career: 1965–1969
- Position: Shooting guard
- Number: 18, 11, 10, 23, 32

Career history
- 1965–1966: Detroit Pistons
- 1966–1968: San Francisco Warriors
- 1968: Milwaukee Bucks
- 1968–1969: Phoenix Suns
- 1969: Los Angeles Stars

Career highlights
- 2× First-team All-WCAC (1962, 1963)
- Stats at NBA.com
- Stats at Basketball Reference

Robert Lee Warlick (March 20, 1941 – September 6, 2005) was an American professional basketball player.

Warlick was born in Hickory, North Carolina, and attended Ridgeview High School. The 6'5" guard/forward played at Pueblo Junior College in Colorado, then transferred to Pepperdine University in 1961. At Pepperdine, he helped the school reach the NCAA Tournament after a season in which he averaged 16.4 points and 9.6 rebounds. Warlick then played professionally in the NBA and ABA as a member of the Detroit Pistons, San Francisco Warriors, Milwaukee Bucks, Phoenix Suns, and Los Angeles Stars. He averaged 7.9 points per game in his professional career, which was cut short by a knee injury.

Warlick later worked for Purex Industries, then established the Youth Sports Foundation in Long Beach, California. He died of a heart attack in 2005.

Warlick's brother, Ernie Warlick, played football for the Buffalo Bills.

Warlick's grandson, Phillyblunts, is an American born music artist. He is known for his albums “The Selfless Heartbreaker,” “Groove,” & “Eat Good, Live Happy.” Phillyblunts is known not only in America but his music is internationally known.

Bobby Warlick is survived by his daughter, Erika Warlick, his two sisters, and two grandchildren one being Phillyblunts.

== Career statistics ==
Legend
GP	Games played	GS	Games started	MPG	Minutes per game
FG%	Field goal percentage	3P%	3-point field goal percentage	FT%	Free throw percentage
RPG	Rebounds per game	APG	Assists per game	SPG	Steals per game
BPG	Blocks per game	PPG	Points per game	**Bold**	Career high

=== NBA ===
==== Regular season ====
Year	Team	GP	GS	MPG	FG%	3P%	FT%	RPG	APG	SPG	BPG	PPG
1965–66	Detroit	10	–	7.8	.289	–	.333	1.6	1.0	–	–	2.4
1966–67	San Francisco	12	–	5.4	.288	–	.545	1.7	0.8	–	–	3.0
1967–68	San Francisco	**69**	–	**19.1**	.421	–	.567	**3.8**	**2.3**	–	–	**8.9**
1968–69	Milwaukee	3	–	7.3	.125	–	**.800**	0.3	0.3	–	–	2.0
1968–69	Phoenix	63	–	15.5	**.423**	–	.606	2.4	2.1	–	–	8.0
Career		157	–	15.7	.410	–	.582	2.9	2.0	–	–	7.5

==== Playoffs ====
Year	Team	GP	GS	MPG	FG%	3P%	FT%	RPG	APG	SPG	BPG	PPG
1966–67	San Francisco	2	–	4.0	.000	–	.000	0.0	0.5	–	–	0.0
1967–68	San Francisco	**10**	–	**22.6**	**.466**	–	**.757**	**5.3**	**2.4**	–	–	**13.8**
Career		12	–	19.5	.458	–	.757	4.4	2.1	–	–	11.5

=== ABA ===
==== Regular season ====
Year	Team	GP	GS	MPG	FG%	3P%	FT%	RPG	APG	SPG	BPG	PPG
1969–70	Los Angeles	**29**	–	**24.5**	**.362**	.000	**.677**	**3.9**	**2.6**	–	–	**10.0**
Career		29	–	24.5	.362	.000	.677	3.9	2.6	–	–	10.0

=== College ===
Year	Team	GP	GS	MPG	FG%	3P%	FT%	RPG	APG	SPG	BPG	PPG
1961–62	Pepperdine	**27**	–	–	.418	–	.638	9.7	–	–	–	16.4
1962–63	Pepperdine	25	–	–	**.446**	–	**.643**	**13.0**	–	–	–	**17.2**
Career		52	–	–	.431	–	.641	11.3	–	–	–	16.8
