= 1968 NBA playoffs =

Postseason tournament

Tournament details
- Dates: March 22–May 2, 1968
- Season: 1967–68
- Teams: 8

Final positions
- Champions: Boston Celtics (10th title)
- Runners-up: Los Angeles Lakers
- Semifinalists: San Francisco Warriors; Philadelphia 76ers

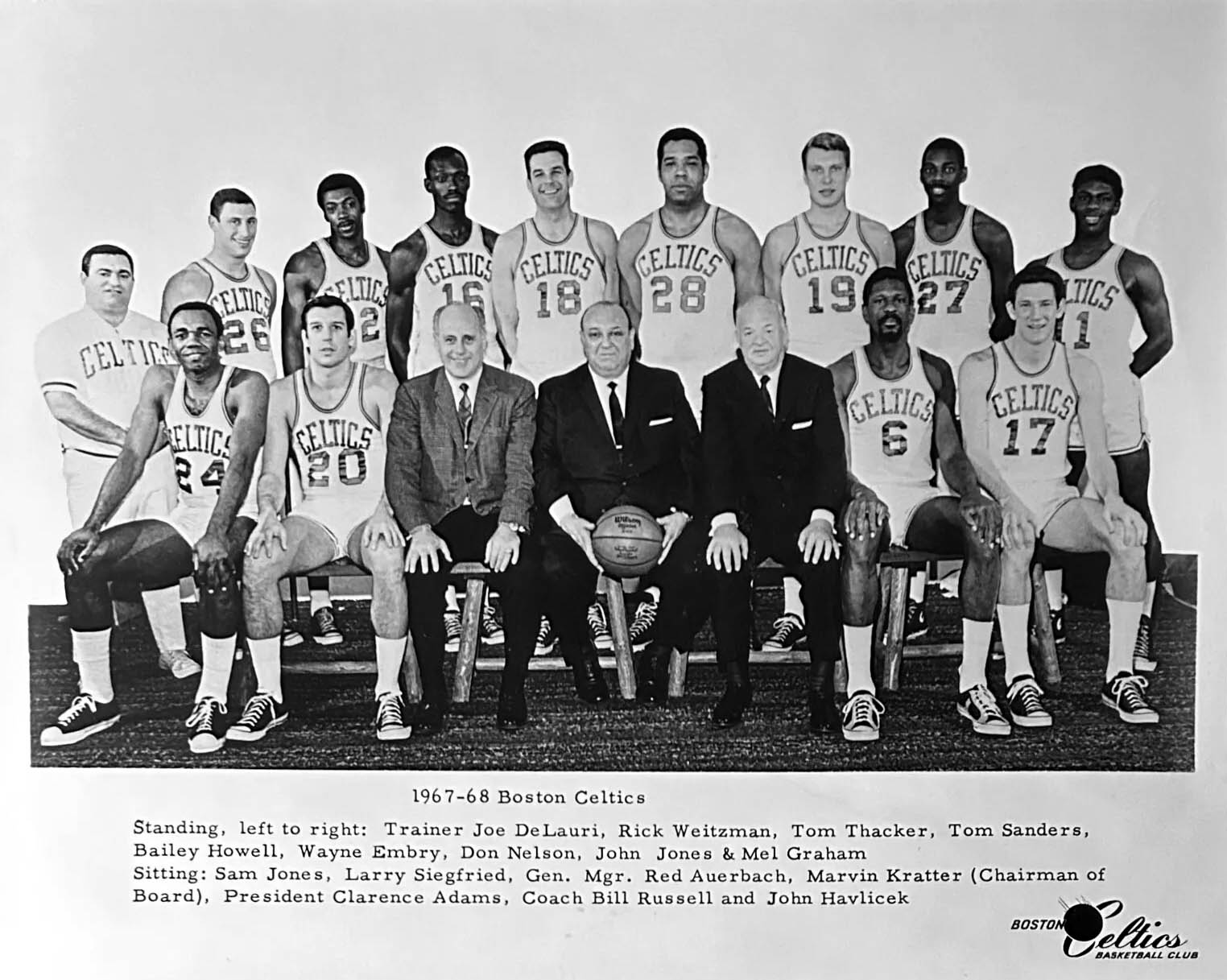
Boston Celtics, champions

The 1968 NBA playoffs was the postseason tournament of the 1967–68 season of the National Basketball Association (NBA). The tournament concluded with the Eastern Division champion Boston Celtics defeating the Western Division champion Los Angeles Lakers, 4 games to 2 in the NBA Finals.

The Celtics won their 10th NBA title, their first under player-coach Bill Russell after Red Auerbach's retirement.

In the Eastern Division Finals, the Celtics became the first team in NBA history to rally from a 3–1 series deficit to win, as they knocked off the defending champion Philadelphia 76ers in seven games. In the West, the Lakers swept the San Francisco Warriors in four games.

It was the first time since 1954 that the top team in a division failed to make the Division Finals; from 1955 to 1966, the league gave the regular-season division champion a first-round bye. This year also marked a change in that the Division Semifinals were changed from a best-of-five to a best-of-seven.

== Bracket ==
Division Semifinals
E1	Philadelphia*	4
E3	New York	2
Eastern Division
E4	Detroit	2
E2	Boston	4
W1	St. Louis*	2
W3	San Francisco	4
Western Division
W4	Chicago	1
W2	Los Angeles	4

Division Finals
E1	Philadelphia*	3
E2	Boston	4
W3	San Francisco	0
W2	Los Angeles	4

NBA Finals
E2	Boston	4
W2	Los Angeles	2

- * Division winner
- Bold Series winner
- Italic Team with home-court advantage in NBA Finals

== Division Semifinals ==
=== Eastern Division Semifinals ===
==== (1) Philadelphia 76ers vs. (3) New York Knicks ====
March 22

Boxscore

New York Knicks 110, Philadelphia 76ers 118
Scoring by quarter: 28–27, 27–25, 21–30, 34–36
Pts: Willis Reed 38; Rebs: Willis Reed 23; Asts: Dick Van Arsdale 8	Pts: Wilt Chamberlain 37; Rebs: Wilt Chamberlain 29; Asts: Wilt Chamberlain 7
Philadelphia leads series, 1–0

Spectrum, Philadelphia, Pennsylvania
Attendance: 5,093

March 23

Boxscore

Philadelphia 76ers 117, New York Knicks 128
Scoring by quarter: 24–30, 25–31, 35–33, 33–34
Pts: Chamberlain, Greer 24 each Rebs: Wilt Chamberlain 17; Asts: Wilt Chamberlain 8	Pts: Walt Bellamy 26; Rebs: Walt Bellamy 17; Asts: Walt Frazier 7
Series tied, 1–1

Madison Square Garden III, Manhattan, New York
Attendance: 15,911

March 27

Boxscore

New York Knicks 132, Philadelphia 76ers 138 (2OT)
Scoring by quarter: 26–27, 23–30, 30–32, 34–24, Overtime: 12–12, 7–13
Pts: Cazzie Russell 40; Rebs: Walt Bellamy 19; Asts: Walt Frazier 9	Pts: Chet Walker 32; Rebs: Wilt Chamberlain 24; Asts: Wilt Chamberlain 8
Philadelphia leads series, 2–1

Spectrum, Philadelphia, Pennsylvania
Attendance: 6,951

March 30

Boxscore

Philadelphia 76ers 98, New York Knicks 107
Scoring by quarter: 24–35, 32–33, 23–19, 19–20
Pts: Wilt Chamberlain 23; Rebs: Wilt Chamberlain 27; Asts: Hal Greer 6	Pts: Walt Bellamy 28; Rebs: Walt Bellamy 13; Asts: Howard Komives 8
Series tied, 2–2

Madison Square Garden III, Manhattan, New York
Attendance: 18,262

March 31

Boxscore

New York Knicks 105, Philadelphia 76ers 123
Scoring by quarter: 34–26, 22–30, 24–36, 25–31
Pts: Cazzie Russell 31; Rebs: Walt Bellamy 10; Asts: Howard Komives 5	Pts: Hal Greer 38; Rebs: Wilt Chamberlain 21; Asts: Chamberlain, Greer 7 each
Philadelphia leads series, 3–2

Spectrum, Philadelphia, Pennsylvania
Attendance: 6,979

April 1

Boxscore

Philadelphia 76ers 113, New York Knicks 97
Scoring by quarter: 27–35, 29–22, 30–19, 27–21
Pts: Hal Greer 35; Rebs: Wilt Chamberlain 27; Asts: Hal Greer 4	Pts: Bellamy, Barnett 19 each Rebs: Walt Bellamy 22; Asts: Howard Komives 6
Philadelphia wins series, 4–2

Madison Square Garden III, Manhattan, New York
Attendance: 18,014

This was the sixth playoff meeting between these two teams, with the 76ers winning three of the first five meetings as the Syracuse Nationals.

Previous playoff series
Philadelphia/ Syracuse leads 3–2 in all-time playoff series

1950

New York Knicks 1, Syracuse Nationals 2

1950 Eastern Division Finals

1951

New York Knicks 3, Syracuse Nationals 2

1951 Eastern Division Finals

1952

New York Knicks 3, Syracuse Nationals 1

1952 Eastern Division Finals

1954

New York Knicks 0, Syracuse Nationals 2

1954 Eastern Division Round Robin Semifinals

1959

New York Knicks 0, Syracuse Nationals 2

1959 Eastern Division Semifinals

==== (2) Boston Celtics vs. (4) Detroit Pistons ====
March 24

Boxscore

Detroit Pistons 116, Boston Celtics 123
Scoring by quarter: 23–22, 29–46, 41–23, 23–32
Pts: Dave Bing 30; Rebs: Dave DeBusschere 24; Asts: Dave Bing 6	Pts: John Havlicek 25; Rebs: Bill Russell 34; Asts: Bill Russell 9
Boston leads series, 1–0

Boston Garden, Boston, Massachusetts
Attendance: 7,591

March 25

Boxscore

Boston Celtics 116, Detroit Pistons 126
Scoring by quarter: 25–28, 33–39, 28–26, 30–33
Pts: Sam Jones 18; Rebs: Bill Russell 14; Asts: Siegfried, Jones 3 each	Pts: Dave Bing 24; Rebs: Joe Strawder 14; Asts: Dave Bing 5
Series tied, 1–1

Cobo Arena, Detroit, Michigan
Attendance: 10,109

March 27

Boxscore

Detroit Pistons 109, Boston Celtics 98
Scoring by quarter: 27–28, 21–24, 33–15, 28–31
Pts: Dave Bing 27; Rebs: Dave DeBusschere 17; Asts: Dave Bing 7	Pts: John Havlicek 23; Rebs: Bill Russell 23; Asts: Bill Russell 7
Detroit leads series, 2–1

Boston Garden, Boston, Massachusetts
Attendance: 8,429

March 28

Boxscore

Boston Celtics 135, Detroit Pistons 110
Scoring by quarter: 28–33, 27–27, 40–26, 40–24
Pts: John Havlicek 35; Rebs: Bill Russell 21; Asts: John Havlicek 9	Pts: Dave Bing 26; Rebs: Dave DeBusschere 10; Asts: Dave Bing 6
Series tied, 2–2

Cobo Arena, Detroit, Michigan
Attendance: 11,294

March 31

Boxscore

Detroit Pistons 96, Boston Celtics 110
Scoring by quarter: 22–22, 28–27, 30–34, 16–27
Pts: Dave DeBusschere 26; Rebs: Dave DeBusschere 23; Asts: Eddie Miles 4	Pts: Bailey Howell 30; Rebs: Bill Russell 21; Asts: John Havlicek 13
Boston leads series, 3–2

Boston Garden, Boston, Massachusetts
Attendance: 8,093

April 1

Boxscore

Boston Celtics 111, Detroit Pistons 103
Scoring by quarter: 22–24, 35–25, 30–31, 24–23
Pts: John Havlicek 31; Rebs: Bill Russell 23; Asts: John Havlicek 12	Pts: Dave Bing 44; Rebs: Dave DeBusschere 14; Asts: Dave Bing 4
Boston wins series, 4–2

Cobo Arena, Detroit, Michigan
Attendance: 9,483

This was the first playoff meeting between these two teams.

=== Western Division Semifinals ===
==== (1) St. Louis Hawks vs. (3) San Francisco Warriors ====
March 22

Boxscore

San Francisco Warriors 111, St. Louis Hawks 106
Scoring by quarter: 25–26, 29–31, 23–20, 34–29
Pts: Jeff Mullins 29; Rebs: Rudy LaRusso 17; Asts: Al Attles 7	Pts: Don Ohl 26; Rebs: Paul Silas 15; Asts: Lenny Wilkens 9
San Francisco leads series, 1–0

Kiel Auditorium, St. Louis, Missouri
Attendance: 5,018

March 23

Boxscore

San Francisco Warriors 103, St. Louis Hawks 111
Scoring by quarter: 27–29, 18–27, 26–22, 32–33
Pts: Jeff Mullins 33; Rebs: Clyde Lee 10; Asts: Al Attles 7	Pts: Zelmo Beaty 46; Rebs: Zelmo Beaty 22; Asts: Lenny Wilkens 11
Series tied, 1–1

Kiel Auditorium, St. Louis, Missouri
Attendance: 5,810

March 26

Boxscore

St. Louis Hawks 109, San Francisco Warriors 124
Scoring by quarter: 19–30, 35–30, 30–33, 25–31
Pts: three players 21 each Rebs: Zelmo Beaty 16; Asts: Lenny Wilkens 5	Pts: Jeff Mullins 33; Rebs: Clyde Lee 22; Asts: Al Attles 7
San Francisco leads series, 2–1

Cow Palace, Daly City, California
Attendance: 5,136

March 29

Boxscore

St. Louis Hawks 107, San Francisco Warriors 108
Scoring by quarter: 22–28, 27–37, 32–16, 26–27
Pts: Zelmo Beaty 21; Rebs: Bill Bridges 14; Asts: Lenny Wilkens 6	Pts: Jeff Mullins 35; Rebs: Clyde Lee 12; Asts: Al Attles 12
San Francisco leads series, 3–1

Oakland–Alameda County Coliseum Arena, Oakland, California
Attendance: 12,325

- Jeff Mullins hits the game-winner.

March 31

Boxscore

San Francisco Warriors 103, St. Louis Hawks 129
Scoring by quarter: 20–35, 31–29, 22–35, 30–30
Pts: Bob Warlick 21; Rebs: Fred Hetzel 9 Asts: Jim King 6	Pts: Bill Bridges 28; Rebs: Lou Hudson 14; Asts: Lenny Wilkens 10
San Francisco leads series, 3–2

Kiel Auditorium, St. Louis, Missouri
Attendance: 4,118

April 2

Boxscore

St. Louis Hawks 106, San Francisco Warriors 111
Scoring by quarter: 30–29, 17–28, 28–30, 31–24
Pts: Lou Hudson 35; Rebs: Paul Silas 14; Asts: Lenny Wilkens 6	Pts: Rudy LaRusso 30; Rebs: Rudy LaRusso 13; Asts: Al Attles 9
San Francisco wins series, 4–2

Cow Palace, Daly City, California
Attendance: 12,905

- Final game for the Hawks before moving to Atlanta.

This was the third playoff meeting between these two teams, with the Warriors winning the first two meetings.

Previous playoff series
San Francisco leads 2–0 in all-time playoff series

1964

St. Louis Hawks 3, San Francisco Warriors 4

1964 Western Division Finals

1967

St. Louis Hawks 2, San Francisco Warriors 4

1967 Western Division Finals

==== (2) Los Angeles Lakers vs. (4) Chicago Bulls ====
March 24

Boxscore

Chicago Bulls 101, Los Angeles Lakers 109
Scoring by quarter: 22–30, 22–23, 25–27, 32–29
Pts: Bob Boozer 27; Rebs: Jim Washington 11; Asts: Keith Erickson 5	Pts: Jerry West 33; Rebs: Elgin Baylor 23; Asts: Elgin Baylor 8
Los Angeles leads series, 1–0

The Forum, Inglewood, California
Attendance: 7,352

March 25

Boxscore

Chicago Bulls 106, Los Angeles Lakers 111
Scoring by quarter: 19–33, 29–25, 26–25, 32–28
Pts: Flynn Robinson 32; Rebs: Jim Washington 13; Asts: Bob Boozer 4	Pts: Jerry West 35; Rebs: Elgin Baylor 16; Asts: Jerry West 8
Los Angeles leads series, 2–0

The Forum, Inglewood, California
Attendance: 8,158

March 27

Boxscore

Los Angeles Lakers 98, Chicago Bulls 104
Scoring by quarter: 26–22, 21–37, 27–23, 24–22
Pts: Jerry West 32; Rebs: Darrall Imhoff 15; Asts: Elgin Baylor 5	Pts: Flynn Robinson 41; Rebs: Jim Washington 17; Asts: Flynn Robinson 4
Los Angeles leads series, 2–1

Chicago Stadium, Chicago, Illinois
Attendance: 3,456
Referees: Nanny Sokolposky, Norm Drucker, Ed Rush

March 29

Boxscore

Los Angeles Lakers 93, Chicago Bulls 87
Scoring by quarter: 23–24, 24–16, 28–28, 18–19
Pts: Elgin Baylor 27; Rebs: Darrall Imhoff 21; Asts: Elgin Baylor 5	Pts: Keith Erickson 20; Rebs: Jim Washington 19; Asts: Erickson, Sloan 2 each
Los Angeles leads series, 3–1

Chicago Stadium, Chicago, Illinois
Attendance: 5,678

March 31

Boxscore

Chicago Bulls 99, Los Angeles Lakers 122
Scoring by quarter: 30–24, 25–34, 19–34, 25–30
Pts: Jim Washington 24; Rebs: Jim Washington 15; Asts: three players 4 each	Pts: Elgin Baylor 37; Rebs: Elgin Baylor 12; Asts: Archie Clark 10
Los Angeles wins series, 4–1

The Forum, Inglewood, California
Attendance: 12,108

This was the first playoff meeting between these two teams.

== Division Finals ==
=== Eastern Division Finals ===
==== (1) Philadelphia 76ers vs. (2) Boston Celtics ====
April 5

Boxscore

Boston Celtics 127, Philadelphia 76ers 118
Scoring by quarter: 34–31, 31–25, 32–31, 30–31
Pts: John Havlicek 35; Rebs: Bill Russell 22; Asts: John Havlicek 11	Pts: Wilt Chamberlain 33; Rebs: Wilt Chamberlain 25; Asts: Chamberlain, W. Jones 5 each
Boston leads series, 1–0

Spectrum, Philadelphia, Pennsylvania
Attendance: 14,412

April 10

Boxscore

Philadelphia 76ers 115, Boston Celtics 106
Scoring by quarter: 32–30, 35–30, 19–17, 29–29
Pts: Wali Jones 24; Rebs: Wilt Chamberlain 19; Asts: Wilt Chamberlain 8	Pts: John Havlicek 28; Rebs: Bill Russell 20; Asts: John Havlicek 9
Series tied, 1–1

Boston Garden, Boston, Massachusetts
Attendance: 14,780

April 11

Boxscore

Boston Celtics 114, Philadelphia 76ers 122
Scoring by quarter: 27–26, 33–30, 25–33, 29–33
Pts: John Havlicek 29; Rebs: Bill Russell 20; Asts: John Havlicek 8	Pts: Hal Greer 31; Rebs: Wilt Chamberlain 25; Asts: Hal Greer 9
Philadelphia leads series, 2–1

Spectrum, Philadelphia, Pennsylvania
Attendance: 15,102

April 14

Boxscore

Philadelphia 76ers 110, Boston Celtics 105
Scoring by quarter: 37–24, 31–38, 18–21, 24–22
Pts: Hal Greer 28; Rebs: Wilt Chamberlain 16; Asts: Wilt Chamberlain 8	Pts: Sam Jones 25; Rebs: Bill Russell 24; Asts: John Havlicek 8
Philadelphia leads series, 3–1

Boston Garden, Boston, Massachusetts
Attendance: 10,503

April 15

Boxscore

Boston Celtics 122, Philadelphia 76ers 104
Scoring by quarter: 36–31, 20–26, 28–24, 38–23
Pts: Sam Jones 37; Rebs: Bill Russell 24; Asts: John Havlicek 10	Pts: Wilt Chamberlain 28; Rebs: Wilt Chamberlain 30; Asts: Wilt Chamberlain 7
Philadelphia leads series, 3–2

Spectrum, Philadelphia, Pennsylvania
Attendance: 15,202

April 17

Boxscore

Philadelphia 76ers 106, Boston Celtics 114
Scoring by quarter: 27–30, 22–29, 28–27, 29–28
Pts: Hal Greer 40; Rebs: Wilt Chamberlain 27; Asts: Wilt Chamberlain 8	Pts: John Havlicek 28; Rebs: Bill Russell 31; Asts: Havlicek, Siegfried 6 each
Series tied, 3–3

Boston Garden, Boston, Massachusetts
Attendance: 14,780

April 19

Boxscore

Boston Celtics 100, Philadelphia 76ers 96
Scoring by quarter: 26–21, 20–19, 27–29, 27–27
Pts: Sam Jones 22; Rebs: Bill Russell 26; Asts: John Havlicek 8	Pts: Hal Greer 22; Rebs: Wilt Chamberlain 34; Asts: Chamberlain, Greer 5 each
Boston wins series, 4–3

Spectrum, Philadelphia, Pennsylvania
Attendance: 15,202

- The Celtics become the first team in NBA playoff history to come back from a 3–1 series deficit.

This was the 12th playoff meeting between these two teams, with the Celtics winning six of the first 11 meetings.

Previous playoff series
Boston leads 6–5 in all-time playoff series

1953

Boston Celtics 2, Syracuse Nationals 0

1953 Eastern Division Semifinals

1954

Boston Celtics 0, Syracuse Nationals 2

1954 Eastern Division Round Robin Semifinals

1954

Boston Celtics 0, Syracuse Nationals 2

1954 Eastern Division Finals

1955

Boston Celtics 1, Syracuse Nationals 3

1955 Eastern Division Finals

1956

Boston Celtics 1, Syracuse Nationals 2

1956 Eastern Division Semifinals

1957

Boston Celtics 3, Syracuse Nationals 0

1957 Eastern Division Finals

1959

Boston Celtics 4, Syracuse Nationals 3

1959 Eastern Division Finals

1961

Boston Celtics 4, Syracuse Nationals 1

1961 Eastern Division Finals

1965

Boston Celtics 4, Philadelphia 76ers 3

1965 Eastern Division Finals

1966

Boston Celtics 4, Philadelphia 76ers 1

1966 Eastern Division Finals

1967

Boston Celtics 1, Philadelphia 76ers 4

1967 Eastern Division Finals

=== Western Division Finals ===
==== (2) Los Angeles Lakers vs. (3) San Francisco Warriors ====
April 5

Boxscore

San Francisco Warriors 105, Los Angeles Lakers 133
Scoring by quarter: 27–33, 24–30, 29–32, 25–38
Pts: Jeff Mullins 29; Rebs: Clyde Lee 18; Asts: Jeff Mullins 5	Pts: Elgin Baylor 29; Rebs: Elgin Baylor 16; Asts: Archie Clark 5
Los Angeles leads series, 1–0

The Forum, Inglewood, California
Attendance: 10,319

April 10

Boxscore

San Francisco Warriors 112, Los Angeles Lakers 115
Scoring by quarter: 24–34, 34–26, 32–24, 22–31
Pts: Fred Hetzel 36; Rebs: Rudy LaRusso 15; Asts: Al Attles 9	Pts: Baylor, West 36 each Rebs: Elgin Baylor 19; Asts: Jerry West 5
Los Angeles leads series, 2–0

The Forum, Inglewood, California
Attendance: 11,270

April 11

Boxscore

Los Angeles Lakers 128, San Francisco Warriors 124
Scoring by quarter: 33–30, 28–35, 39–25, 28–34
Pts: Jerry West 40; Rebs: Elgin Baylor 12; Asts: Jerry West 8	Pts: Fred Hetzel 27; Rebs: Rudy LaRusso 13; Asts: Jeff Mullins 7
Los Angeles leads series, 3–0

Cow Palace, Daly City, California
Attendance: 9,232

April 13

Boxscore

Los Angeles Lakers 106, San Francisco Warriors 100
Scoring by quarter: 20–24, 29–28, 30–27, 27–21
Pts: Jerry West 29	Pts: Fred Hetzel 27
Los Angeles wins series, 4–0

Cow Palace, Daly City, California
Attendance: 9,623

This was the second playoff meeting between these two teams, with the Warriors winning the first meeting.

Previous playoff series
San Francisco leads 1–0 in all-time playoff series

1967

Los Angeles Lakers 0, San Francisco Warriors 3

1967 Western Division Semifinals

== NBA Finals: (E2) Boston Celtics vs. (W2) Los Angeles Lakers ==
April 21

Boxscore

Los Angeles Lakers 101, Boston Celtics 107
Scoring by quarter: 28–29, 33–19, 24–33, 16–26
Pts: Jerry West 25; Rebs: Darrall Imhoff 14; Asts: Archie Clark 5	Pts: Bailey Howell 20; Rebs: Bill Russell 25; Asts: John Havlicek 8
Boston leads series, 1–0

Boston Garden, Boston, Massachusetts
Attendance: 9,546

April 24

Boxscore

Los Angeles Lakers 123, Boston Celtics 113
Scoring by quarter: 28–27, 26–27, 36–27, 33–32
Pts: Jerry West 35; Rebs: Darrall Imhoff 11; Asts: Erwin Mueller 7	Pts: John Havlicek 24; Rebs: Bill Russell 24; Asts: Bill Russell 5
Series tied, 1–1

Boston Garden, Boston, Massachusetts
Attendance: 14,780

April 26

Boxscore

Boston Celtics 127, Los Angeles Lakers 119
Scoring by quarter: 36–28, 33–34, 34–25, 24–32
Pts: John Havlicek 27; Rebs: Bill Russell 16; Asts: Bill Russell 9	Pts: Jerry West 33; Rebs: Elgin Baylor 18; Asts: Jerry West 9
Boston leads series, 2–1

The Forum, Inglewood, California
Attendance: 17,011

April 28

Boxscore

Boston Celtics 105, Los Angeles Lakers 118
Scoring by quarter: 21–26, 23–26, 31–28, 30–38
Pts: Bailey Howell 24; Rebs: Bill Russell 22; Asts: John Havlicek 8	Pts: Jerry West 38; Rebs: Darrall Imhoff 20; Asts: Darrall Imhoff 6
Series tied, 2–2

The Forum, Inglewood, California
Attendance: 17,147

April 30

Boxscore

Los Angeles Lakers 117, Boston Celtics 120 (OT)
Scoring by quarter: 20–34, 34–22, 18–30, 36–22, Overtime: 9–12
Pts: Jerry West 35; Rebs: Elgin Baylor 15; Asts: Baylor, West 6 each	Pts: John Havlicek 31; Rebs: Bill Russell 25; Asts: John Havlicek 8
Boston leads series, 3–2

Boston Garden, Boston, Massachusetts
Attendance: 14,780

May 2

Boxscore

Boston Celtics 124, Los Angeles Lakers 109
Scoring by quarter: 35–28, 35–22, 24–28, 30–31
Pts: John Havlicek 40; Rebs: Bill Russell 19; Asts: John Havlicek 7	Pts: Elgin Baylor 28; Rebs: Mel Counts 25; Asts: Elgin Baylor 6
Boston wins series, 4–2

The Forum, Inglewood, California
Attendance: 17,392

This was the sixth playoff meeting between these two teams, with the Celtics winning the first five meetings.

Previous playoff series
Boston leads 5–0 in all-time playoff series

1959

Boston Celtics 4, Minneapolis Lakers 0

1959 NBA Finals

1962

Boston Celtics 4, Los Angeles Lakers 3

1962 NBA Finals

1963

Boston Celtics 4, Los Angeles Lakers 2

1963 NBA Finals

1965

Boston Celtics 4, Los Angeles Lakers 1

1965 NBA Finals

1966

Boston Celtics 4, Los Angeles Lakers 3

1966 NBA Finals

== See also ==
- 1968 NBA Finals
- 1967-68 NBA season
