= Dave DeBusschere =

American athlete (1940–2003)

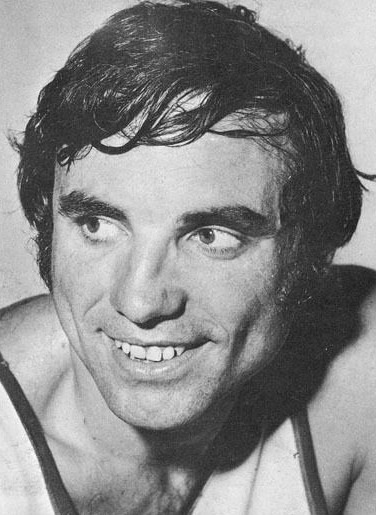
- DeBusschere, circa 1974

Personal information
- Born: October 16, 1940 Detroit, Michigan, U.S.
- Died: May 14, 2003 (aged 62) New York City, New York, U.S.
- Listed height: 6 ft 6 in (1.98 m)
- Listed weight: 220 lb (100 kg)

Career information
- High school: Austin Catholic Preparatory School (Detroit, Michigan)
- College: Detroit (1959–1962)
- NBA draft: 1962: territorial pick
- Drafted by: Detroit Pistons
- Playing career: 1962–1974
- Position: Power forward / small forward
- Number: 22

Career history

Playing
- 1962–1968: Detroit Pistons
- 1968–1974: New York Knicks

Career highlights
- 2× NBA champion (1970, 1973); 8× NBA All-Star (1966–1968, 1970–1974); 6× NBA All-Defensive First Team (1969–1974); All-NBA Second Team (1969); NBA All-Rookie First Team (1963); NBA anniversary team (50th, 75th); No. 22 retired by New York Knicks; 2× Second-team All-American – NEA (1961, 1962); Second-team All-American – NABC (1961); 3× Third-team All-American – UPI (1960–1962); Third-team All-American – AP, NABC (1962); No. 22 retired by Detroit Mercy Titans; Fourth-team Parade All-American (1958)

Career NBA statistics
- Points: 14,053 (16.1 ppg)
- Rebounds: 9,618 (11.0 rpg)
- Assists: 2,497 (2.9 apg)
- Stats at NBA.com
- Stats at Basketball Reference
- Basketball Hall of Fame
- Collegiate Basketball Hall of Fame

David Albert DeBusschere (October 16, 1940 – May 14, 2003) was an American professional basketball player and coach, and professional baseball player. He played for the Chicago White Sox of MLB in 1962 and 1963 and in the NBA for the Detroit Pistons from 1962 through 1968 and for the New York Knicks from 1968 to 1974. He was also the head coach for the Pistons from 1964 through 1967.

DeBusschere was inducted into the Naismith Basketball Hall of Fame in 1983. In 1996, DeBusschere was named as one of the 50 greatest players in NBA history. In October 2021, DeBusschere was again honored as one of the league's greatest players of all time by being named to the NBA 75th Anniversary Team.

== Early life ==
DeBusschere was born in Detroit to parents Peter Marcel and Dorothy DeBusschere. He attended Austin Catholic Preparatory School and inspired the "White Shirted Legion" (the tradition of wearing white shirts to the school's games to make fans more visible). As a junior, he was named all-state, and in his senior year of 1957–58, in just the school's third year of organized basketball, he led his team to the Michigan Class A high school basketball championship, scoring 32 points despite fouling out midway through the fourth quarter as the Friars defeated Benton Harbor High School and DeBusschere's future NBA rival forward Chet Walker.

“Debusschere” is a Dutch-language surname, as his family had come from Torhout in West Flanders in Belgium. Although its Dutch pronunciation would have been closer to “de-bus-ghe-re”, Dave DeBusschere used an anglicized pronunciation of “De Busher”, by which he was always known.

== College career ==
DeBusschere starred in both basketball and baseball at the University of Detroit, since merged into the University of Detroit Mercy. He averaged 24 points a game in basketball, helping Detroit reach the National Invitation Tournament twice and the NCAA basketball tournament once. He also pitched the Titans to three NCAA baseball tournament berths.

== Baseball career ==
In 1962, DeBusschere was signed by the Chicago White Sox as an amateur free agent. He was a pitcher for the White Sox from 1962 to 1963. He pitched a shutout on August 13, 1963, against the Cleveland Indians, giving up six hits, one walk and striking out three. In 22 career at-bats, he had only one hit, a single off Bennie Daniels on July 17, 1963. He pitched in the White Sox minor league system for two more seasons before giving up pitching to focus on both playing and coaching basketball.

He is one of only 13 athletes to have played in both the NBA and Major League Baseball. The 13 are: Danny Ainge, Frank Baumholtz, Hank Biasatti, Gene Conley, Chuck Connors, DeBusschere, Dick Groat, Steve Hamilton, Mark Hendrickson, Cotton Nash, Ron Reed, Dick Ricketts and Howie Schultz.

== Basketball career ==
=== Detroit Pistons ===
DeBusschere was selected by the Detroit Pistons in 1962 NBA draft as a territorial draft selection. During his rookie season, he averaged 12.7 points and 8.7 rebounds per game, and was later named to the NBA All-Rookie Team. However, DeBusschere was injured during his second season and only played in 15 games, resulting in the Pistons finishing with a disappointing record of 23–59.

In the 1964–1965 season, at the age of 24, he was given the position of player-coach for the Pistons, and thus became the youngest-ever coach in league history. However, this stint as coach was not successful and he became a full-time player. During the 1968–1969 season, DeBusschere was traded to the New York Knicks for Walt Bellamy and Howard Komives.

While a member of the Pistons, DeBusschere appeared as himself on the April 29, 1963 episode of the game show To Tell the Truth. He received two votes.

=== New York Knicks ===
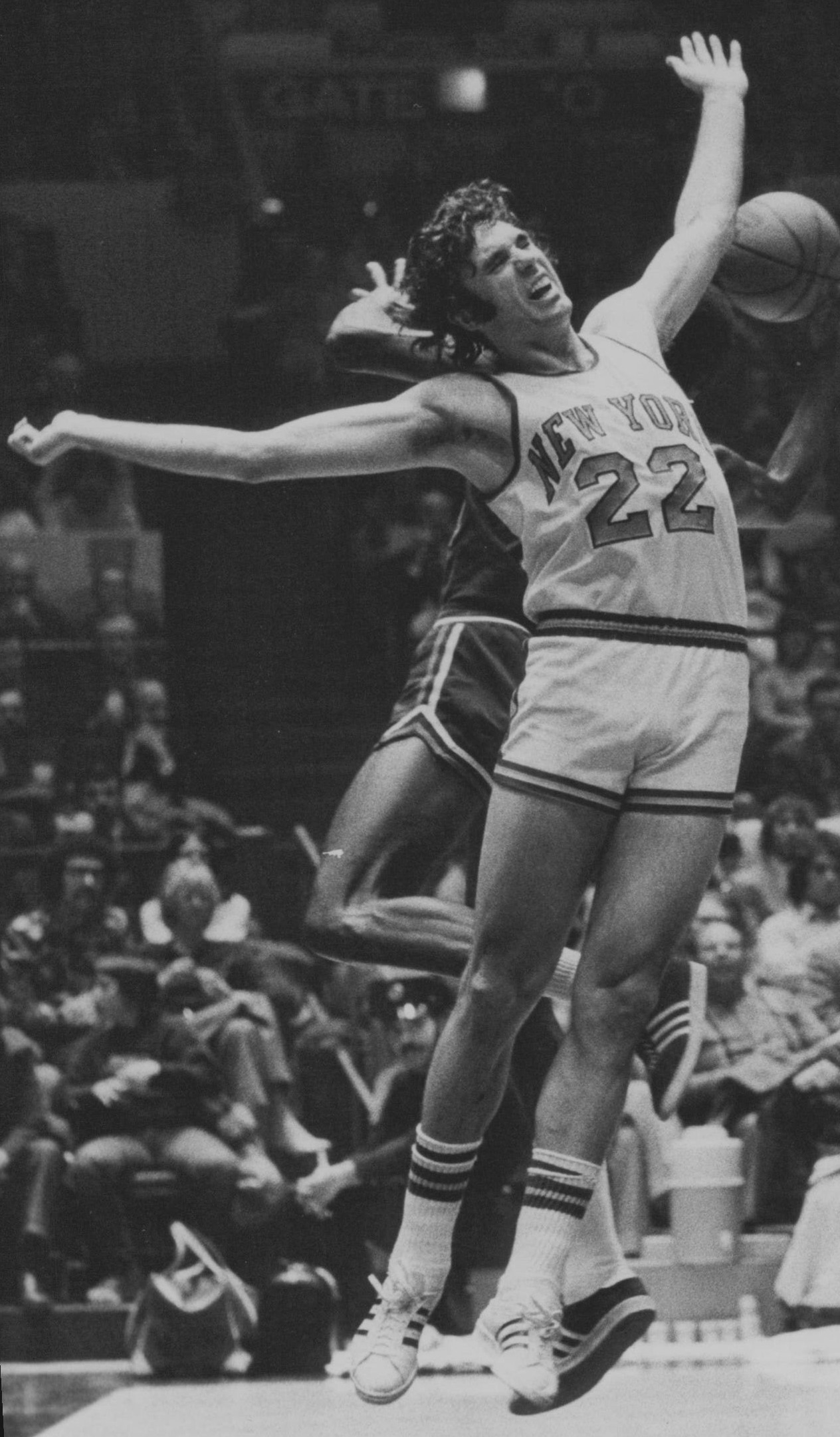
DeBusschere was named to the First Team All-Defensive Team every season of his career after the inception of the designation.

DeBusschere, along with future Hall of Famers Willis Reed, Bill Bradley and Walt Frazier, became an NBA champion when the Knicks defeated the Los Angeles Lakers in the 1970 NBA Finals. With Earl Monroe in the backcourt, they became champions again in 1973, beating the Lakers 4–1 in the finals.

DeBusschere was elected to the Naismith Memorial Basketball Hall of Fame in 1983 after a 12-year career (1962–1974) in which he averaged 16.1 points and 11 rebounds while being named to eight NBA All-Star teams. He became a member of the NBA 50th Anniversary All-Time Team in 1996. He was renowned for his physical style of play and tenacious defense, and he was named to the NBA All-Defensive first team six times.

== Life after basketball ==
DeBusschere retired as a player in 1974, and his no. 22 jersey was retired by the Knicks, though not until many years later; it is thought the delay was due to his taking a front office job with the rival New York Nets of the American Basketball Association upon his retirement. The next year DeBusschere became the ABA's commissioner for the 1975–76 season, which would be the last for the league. He helped bring about the merger between the NBA and the ABA that year. He was later the assistant coach and director of basketball operations of the Knicks during the 1980s, when he drafted fellow Knicks legend Patrick Ewing with the first overall selection in 1985.

DeBusschere and some partners purchased Ring magazine in 1979.

DeBusschere authored a book entitled The Open Man, a chronicle of the New York Knicks' 1969–70 championship season.

== Death ==
In May 2003, DeBusschere collapsed on a Manhattan street from a heart attack and was pronounced dead at New York University Hospital. DeBusschere was interred at Saint Joseph's Church Cemetery in Garden City, New York. DeBusschere, who lived in Garden City, was survived by his wife, Gerri (who died of cancer in 2009), sons Peter and Dennis, and daughter Michelle.

In his honor, the University of Detroit Mercy inaugurated the Dave DeBusschere Scholarship in 2003. It provides support to two student-athletes who must have a minimum grade point average of 3.0 and have demonstrated exceptional leadership skills.

== NBA career statistics ==
Legend
GP	Games played	GS	Games started	MPG	Minutes per game
FG%	Field goal percentage	3P%	3-point field goal percentage	FT%	Free throw percentage
RPG	Rebounds per game	APG	Assists per game	SPG	Steals per game
BPG	Blocks per game	PPG	Points per game	**Bold**	Career high
†	Won an NBA championship

=== Regular season ===
Year	Team	GP	GS	MPG	FG%	3P%	FT%	RPG	APG	SPG	BPG	PPG
1962–63	Detroit	80	—	29.4	.430	—	.718	8.7	2.6	—	—	12.7
1963–64	Detroit	15	—	20.3	.391	—	.581	7.0	1.5	—	—	8.6
1964–65	Detroit	79	—	35.1	.425	—	.700	11.1	3.2	—	—	16.7
1965–66	Detroit	79	—	34.1	.408	—	.659	11.6	2.6	—	—	16.4
1966–67	Detroit	78	—	37.1	.415	—	.705	11.8	2.8	—	—	**18.2**
1967–68	Detroit	80	—	39.1	.442	—	.664	**13.5**	2.3	—	—	17.9
1968–69	Detroit	29	—	37.7	.447	—	.723	12.2	2.2	—	—	16.3
1968–69	New York	47	—	**39.4**	.442	—	.682	11.4	2.7	—	—	16.4
1969–70†	New York	79	—	33.3	.451	—	.688	10.0	2.5	—	—	14.6
1970–71	New York	**81**	—	35.7	.421	—	.696	11.1	2.7	—	—	15.6
1971–72	New York	80	—	38.4	.427	—	.728	11.3	**3.6**	—	—	15.4
1972–73†	New York	77	—	36.7	.435	—	.746	10.2	3.4	—	—	16.3
1973–74	New York	71	—	38.0	**.461**	—	**.756**	10.7	**3.6**	**.9**	**.5**	18.1
Career		875	—	35.7	.432	—	.699	11.0	2.9	.9	.5	16.1
All-Star		8	1	20.9	.457	—	.750	6.4	1.4	.1	.0	9.6

=== Playoffs ===
Year	Team	GP	GS	MPG	FG%	3P%	FT%	RPG	APG	SPG	BPG	PPG
1963	Detroit	4	—	39.8	.424	—	.682	15.8	1.5	—	—	**20.0**
1968	Detroit	6	—	**43.8**	.425	—	.578	**16.2**	2.2	—	—	19.3
1969	New York	10	—	41.9	.351	—	**.820**	14.8	3.3	—	—	16.3
1970†	New York	**19**	—	36.9	.421	—	.662	11.6	2.4	—	—	16.1
1971	New York	12	—	40.7	.416	—	.659	13.0	1.8	—	—	16.4
1972	New York	16	—	38.5	**.450**	—	.750	12.1	2.3	—	—	16.6
1973†	New York	17	—	37.1	.442	—	.775	10.5	**3.4**	—	—	15.6
1974	New York	12	—	33.7	.380	—	.621	8.3	3.2	**.6**	**.3**	12.0
Career		96	—	38.4	.416	—	.698	12.0	2.6	.6	.3	16.0

== Head coaching record ==
Team	Year	G	W	L	W–L%	Finish	PG	PW	PL	PW–L%	Result
Detroit	1964–65	69	29	40	.420	4th in Western	—	—	—	—	Missed playoffs
Detroit	1965–66	80	22	58	.275	5th in Western	—	—	—	—	Missed playoffs
Detroit	1966–67	73	28	45	.384	—	—	—	—	—	Missed playoffs
Career		222	79	143	.356		—	—	—	—	

== See also ==
- List of National Basketball Association career rebounding leaders
- List of NCAA Division I men's basketball players with 30 or more rebounds in a game
- List of NCAA Division I men's basketball career rebounding leaders
