= 1970 ABA draft =

Basketball player selection

General information
- Sport: Basketball
- Dates: January 22, 1970 (Rounds 1–8); March 15, 1970 (Rounds 9–17)
- Location: Indianapolis, Indiana (January); New York, New York (March)

Overview
- 155 total selections in 17 rounds
- League: American Basketball Association
- Teams: 11
- Territorial picks: Bob Lanier, New York Nets
- First selection: Pete Maravich, Carolina Cougars

The 1970 ABA draft was the fourth draft done by the American Basketball Association (ABA), a rivaling professional basketball league to the National Basketball Association (NBA) that they would eventually merge with as a part of the NBA later in the decade. This draft would begin at the earliest time the ABA would ever begin a draft yet on January 22, 1970, out in Indianapolis (home of the Indiana Pacers) for the first eight rounds, with the league concluding its final rounds afterward on March 15 that year out in their new headquarters in New York (which also was the home location of the New York Nets as well). This draft also marked the first time that the ABA would successfully steal away some highly talented collegiate players from the NBA by having Dan Issel from the University of Kentucky, Charlie Scott from the University of North Carolina, and Rick Mount from Purdue University sign up with the ABA early through the Kentucky Colonels, Virginia Squires, and Indiana Pacers respectively over their respective late NBA draft choices by the Detroit Pistons, Boston Celtics, and Los Angeles Lakers. While Mount would disappoint in his professional career by comparison to his high school and collegiate careers, both Issel and Scott would become Hall of Famers that gained their professional starts in the ABA before later playing in the NBA. The Denver Rockets would also gain another successful sophomore underclassman after this year's draft concluded after previously being successful last year with Spencer Haywood by signing Ralph Simpson to their team on the month of June 1970, marking the second year in a row where the ABA would acquire another successful underclassman from outside of the draft systems of both the ABA and NBA (as well as marking the second year in a row that the team would be forcefully removed of a first-round pick of theirs in an upcoming draft not long afterward). Despite the new successes at hand, the ABA would see a high number of teams (over half of the league) either relocate and/or otherwise rebrand themselves following the draft's conclusion, with some teams trying to prepare themselves for an anticipated ABA-NBA merger in advance by this point in time. As such, it became the final draft years that the Los Angeles Stars, Miami Floridians, New Orleans Buccaneers, and Pittsburgh Pipers would participate in the ABA draft entirely, as well as the only draft year that the Washington Caps would participate in while working under that team name. (The Dallas Chaparrals would also rebrand themselves during this season as well, similar to the Pipers rebranding themselves following this particular draft period, though like the Pipers when they first moved from Pittsburgh to Minnesota in 1968, this year wouldn't be the last year that they'd draft under the Dallas Chaparrals name.)

== Draftee career notes ==
By technicality, Bob Lanier would be considered a Territorial Pick for the New York Nets due to the Nets forfeiting their initial slot in the first round in order to use a Territorial Pick selection on him since he resided in the state of New York (specifically within the city of Buffalo) and played at St. Bonaventure University out in Olean, New York at the time of the draft. As such, he wouldn't be considered a normal #1 selection for the ABA draft like most other prospects were for the ABA's draft history. However, if he were to count as such, he would not only be the fourth player in a row that the ABA would select at #1 alongside the NBA in the same draft year, but he would also be the third #1 pick in a row to become a Hall of Famer despite never playing in the ABA. The latter notion would also apply for the player that would be considered the actual #1 pick instead if Lanier's Territorial Pick wouldn't count as the #1 selection, Pete Maravich from Louisiana State University by the Carolina Cougars, due to the fact that he was actually drafted as the third pick by the NBA in the 1970 NBA draft. While Pete Maravich would have the more celebrated career between the two players (seeing as how Maravich appeared on both the 50 Greatest Players in NBA History and NBA 75th Anniversary Team listings), both players would still be celebrated for multiple teams that they each played for while out in the NBA, with each of them having multiple jersey numbers retired for different NBA teams due to their production at hand for each team in question that they were retired under. In addition to them, this draft also saw players like Dave Cowens, Rudy Tomjanovich, Calvin Murphy, and Nate Archibald all become Hall of Famers as well (with Tomjanovich also being a successful, two-time championship winning head coach in the NBA to boot) despite them never playing a single minute in the ABA for teams like the Los Angeles Stars (rebranded as the Utah Stars), Miami Floridians (rebranded to just "The Floridians"), Pittsburgh Pipers (rebranded as the Pittsburgh Condors), or Dallas Chaparrals (briefly rebranded as the Texas Chaparrals and later the San Antonio Spurs on a more permanent basis) respectively. Despite that noise, the ABA would have two players that played for their league (one on a more permanent basis before the ABA-NBA merger came to pass) that ultimately became members of the Basketball Hall of Fame themselves for their professional careers with Dan Issel from the Kentucky Colonels (who coincidentally also played collegiately at the nearby University of Kentucky) and Charlie Scott of the Washington Caps (soon rebranded as the Virginia Squires), both of whom shared the ABA's Rookie of the Year Award that year (the only time the ABA allowed for such an honor to occur between their rookies).

Out of 92 overall ABA All-Stars, there were only five players eligible to be selected from this year's draft that would make it to multiple ABA All-Star Games (none of the players that made the event this year only made it to the All-Star Game only once while in the ABA). Dan Issel of the Kentucky Colonels would have the most ABA All-Star Game appearances out of everyone from this year's draft with six total appearances (meaning he appeared in the game in every year the ABA played a season following this draft, as well as tie Jimmy Jones for the second-most All-Star appearances for the ABA), including winning that game's MVP honors in 1972, as well as tied Mel Daniels and two other players that were considered draft eligible for the 1971 ABA draft period for the most All-ABA Team appearances with five total appearances (one first team appearance in his second season and four second team appearances elsewhere, including a tied appearance at center with Zelmo Beaty of the Utah Stars in his rookie season for the second team, which was the only time the ABA created a tied position for an All-ABA Team spot for either the first team or the second team) and lead the league in scoring during his rookie season before becoming a champion in his final season with Kentucky and then being an All-Star in the NBA while with the since-rebranded Denver Nuggets (who would later retire his number after his own retirement from play, though he would also coach the Nuggets later on in the NBA). Following Issel in terms of All-Star appearances in the ABA would be Ralph Simpson, who left Michigan State University after two years of play to join the Denver Rockets, where he would not only become the franchise's all-time leader in points scored with 9,953 total made alongside other various factions led while in the ABA, but he would also become a five-time All-Star for them following his rookie season and have three All-ABA team appearances to boot (two spots for the second team and one final spot for the first team during the league's final season of existence), though he would cost them another first-round pick the following year as well as not match the same success he had in the ABA once he entered the NBA. After Simpson, late early round selections Billy Paultz from the Washington Caps (officially rebranded as the Virginia Squires after the draft) would be an ABA All-Time Team member alongside Issel by taking part in four ABA All-Star Games alongside being a champion player in 1974 for the New York Nets and leading the league in blocks during the league's final season of existence in 1976 while in San Antonio. Another player drafted by that same team that was taken earlier than Paultz, Charlie Scott, would also make it to the ABA All-Time Team by playing in the ABA All-Star Game for both seasons he played for the league while with the Virginia Squires, as well as tying the league's Rookie of the Year Award with Dan Issel and making it to the All-ABA First Team in his rookie season and the All-ABA Second Team in his second season before leaving the Squires to join the Phoenix Suns in the NBA and later winning the NBA Finals with the team that first drafted him there, the Boston Celtics, while going against the Suns, funnily enough. Finally, Wendell Ladner from the New Orleans Buccaneers (officially rebranded as the Memphis Pros after the draft) was the only other rookie from this year's draft that not only made it to the ABA's All-Rookie Team that year, but also made it to multiple ABA All-Star Games in his first two years while in Memphis. However, Ladner's career would end in tragedy after he won the ABA Finals in 1974 with the Nets, as a year after that, on June 24, 1975, at 26 years old, he would be one of the 113 fatalities involved from the Eastern Air Lines Flight 66 crash, with Ladner notably being identified by his ABA championship ring (being the only ABA player to die while the league was still existing at the time); the Nets would later dedicate their final season of ABA play to Ladner, ultimate winning the final championship of the ABA's existence in May 1976 over the Denver Nuggets that year following the ABA-NBA merger a month later in June 1976. Outside of the draft's historic All-Star and Hall of Fame selections, this draft was also notable for having the Washington Caps draft someone outside of the United States of America for the first time ever (notably going against the grain of the American Basketball Association name at the time) due to Greg Howard leaving the University of New Mexico to play for the Brill Cagliari out in Italy under a professional basis at the time of his selection; his selection would help encourage the ABA to draft other players that wouldn't quite fit the American mold that was under the ABA's namesake and try to have them play for their league instead, with varying degrees of success afterward (their best foreign-born success story related to that of UCLA center Swen Nater from The Netherlands only years after this draft concluded).

== Historic draft notes ==
Much like the first three years of the ABA's draft existence, there has been no generally known record of which player was taken in which draft round outside of Bob Lanier essentially being the #1 territorial pick of the New York Nets and Pete Maravich being the alternative #1 pick instead, as well as select records of certain trades that were made during this draft and the notation of the Denver Rockets forfeiting their first-round pick (which would have been the third overall selection normally) in relation to acquiring Spencer Haywood from the previous year's draft and the Nets relinquishing what would have been their seventh overall pick officially to acquire the territorial pick rights to Bob Lanier early in the draft as of 2025. However, unlike the other previous drafts the ABA did, there would be historical records preserved to showcase at least the first three rounds of this year's ABA draft in terms of what their draft ordering was like that year for at least those specific rounds. With that being said, if one were to use the records from the 1969–70 ABA season as a guide for draft ordering for at least most of the rounds in this draft, then the order from the worst to best ABA teams in this draft would be from this following order: Miami Floridians, Pittsburgh Pipers, New York Nets, New Orleans Buccaneers (most likely speaking due to them losing the tiebreaker for the purpose of them being the only Western Division team to miss the ABA Playoffs altogether despite them recording an average 42–42 record that season), Carolina Cougars (most likely speaking due to them actually making it to the ABA Playoffs as a third place Eastern Division team), Los Angeles Stars, Washington Caps, either the Dallas Chaparrals or the Kentucky Colonels (with the other team taking the other spot. if not alternating spots in each round due to tiebreaker rules since they both won second place in their respective divisions that season), the Denver Rockets, and Indiana Pacers. While this draft showcased success in terms of not just finding capable talents that could compete against the NBA's best players, but also persuading them to join the ABA instead of the NBA (which helped them gain some ground in their upcoming ABA-NBA merger talks at the time), the aftermath relating to this draft period also showcased the ABA's greatest financial instability yet for certain teams by that point in time by seeing the most number of teams either rebrand and/or relocate their teams to something else after this draft period ended. More specifically, it saw some teams experiment with being more regional-based franchises similar to that of the Carolina Cougars the previous season in order to potentially expand their fanbases by having the Dallas Chaparrals rename themselves to the Texas Chaparrals in an attempt for the team to appeal to the entire state of Texas as a whole (specifically playing in both Lubbock and Fort Worth alongside Dallas), the runner-up Los Angeles Stars moving to the state of Utah for the rest of their tenure to become the Utah Stars (though they'd really reside in Salt Lake City specifically), the Miami Floridians being renamed to just "The Floridians" in an rather unique attempt to have the team appeal to and represent all of Florida (while playing in Tampa, St. Petersburg, and briefly Jacksonville and West Palm Beach alongside Miami) the New Orleans Buccaneers briefly were renamed to the Louisiana Buccaneers (while primarily playing in New Orleans with other cities in the state like Shreveport, Lafayette, Monroe, and Baton Rouge being planned secondary locations for them) in order to appeal to and represent all of Louisiana before newer ownership changed hands and led to them moving to Memphis, Tennessee in order to become the Memphis Pros before beginning the upcoming ABA season, and the Washington Caps would move to the nearby state of Virginia to become the Virginia Squires (playing out in Norfolk, Hampton, Richmond, and briefly Roanoke) partially due to safety concerns related to the area they played in also being involved with the 1968 Washington D.C. race riots and partially due to the team hearing rumors of an NBA–ABA merger coming about (which ultimately got delayed by six years due to the Oscar Robertson v. National Basketball Association antitrust lawsuit filed by Oscar Robertson and the National Basketball Players Association), while the Pittsburgh Pipers would be the only team to just rebrand themselves by first briefly becoming the Pittsburgh Pioneers before lawsuit threats by both Point Park College and a different "Name That Team" contestant named Angela Weaver via the winning essay entry done by Don Seymour supposedly using twice as much words allowed in that contest's 25 word limit forced them into creating the Pittsburgh Condors name that they'd use for the rest of their existence. As such, over half of the ABA would either move around or rebrand themselves before the start of their upcoming season following this draft's conclusion. Even so, any players that have a ‡ next to their names during this draft period mean that these players were selected for the ABA All-Time Team in 1997.

== Draft ==
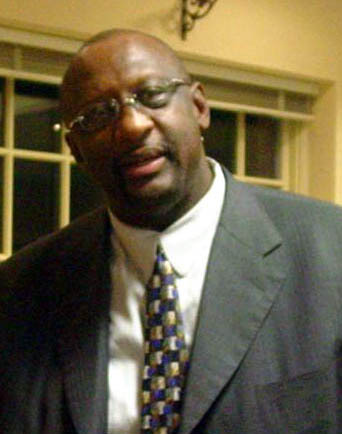
Bob Lanier was officially considered the #1 pick (by being the territorial pick) of the 1970 ABA Draft by the New York Nets.

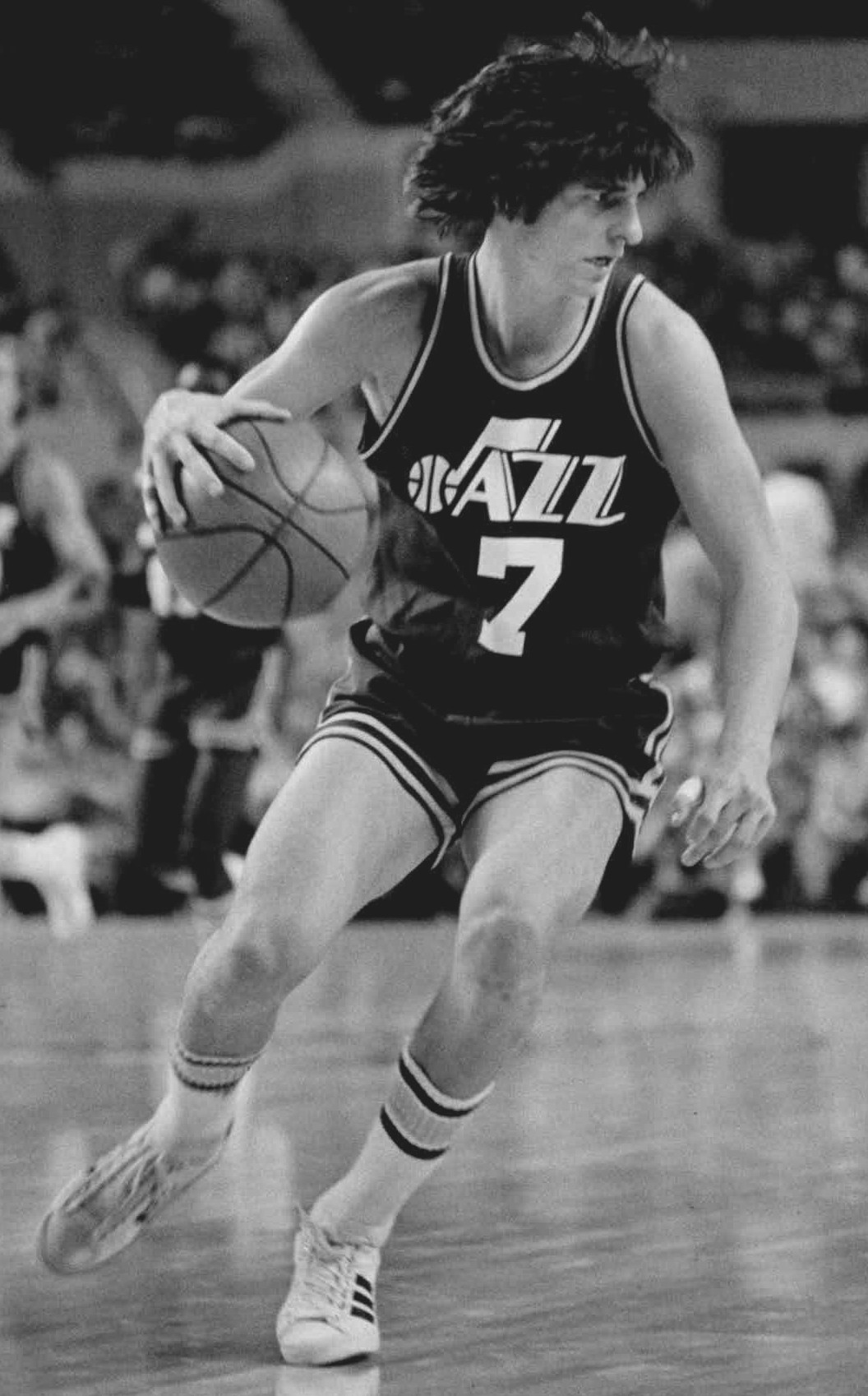
Pete Maravich was selected as the 1st pick in the first round (second overall pick) of the 1970 ABA Draft by the Carolina Cougars.

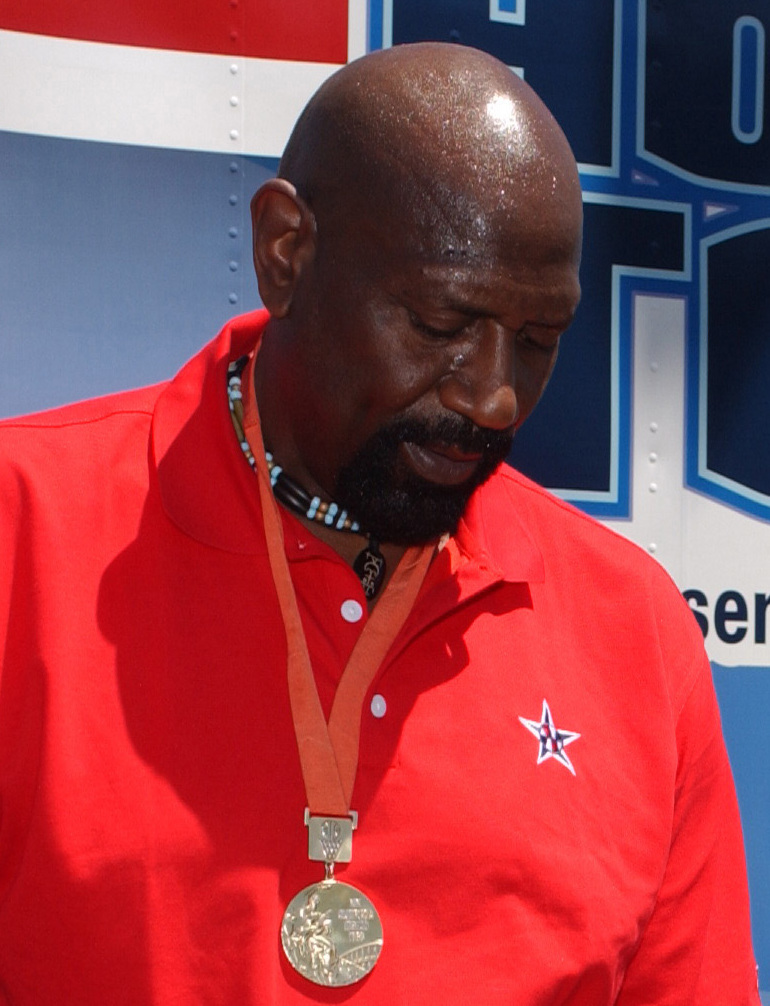
Spencer Haywood was the price paid by the Denver Rockets in exchange for them forfeiting their first round pick (which would have been the 3rd overall pick, excluding the territorial pick, had it been conveyed) in the 1970 ABA Draft.

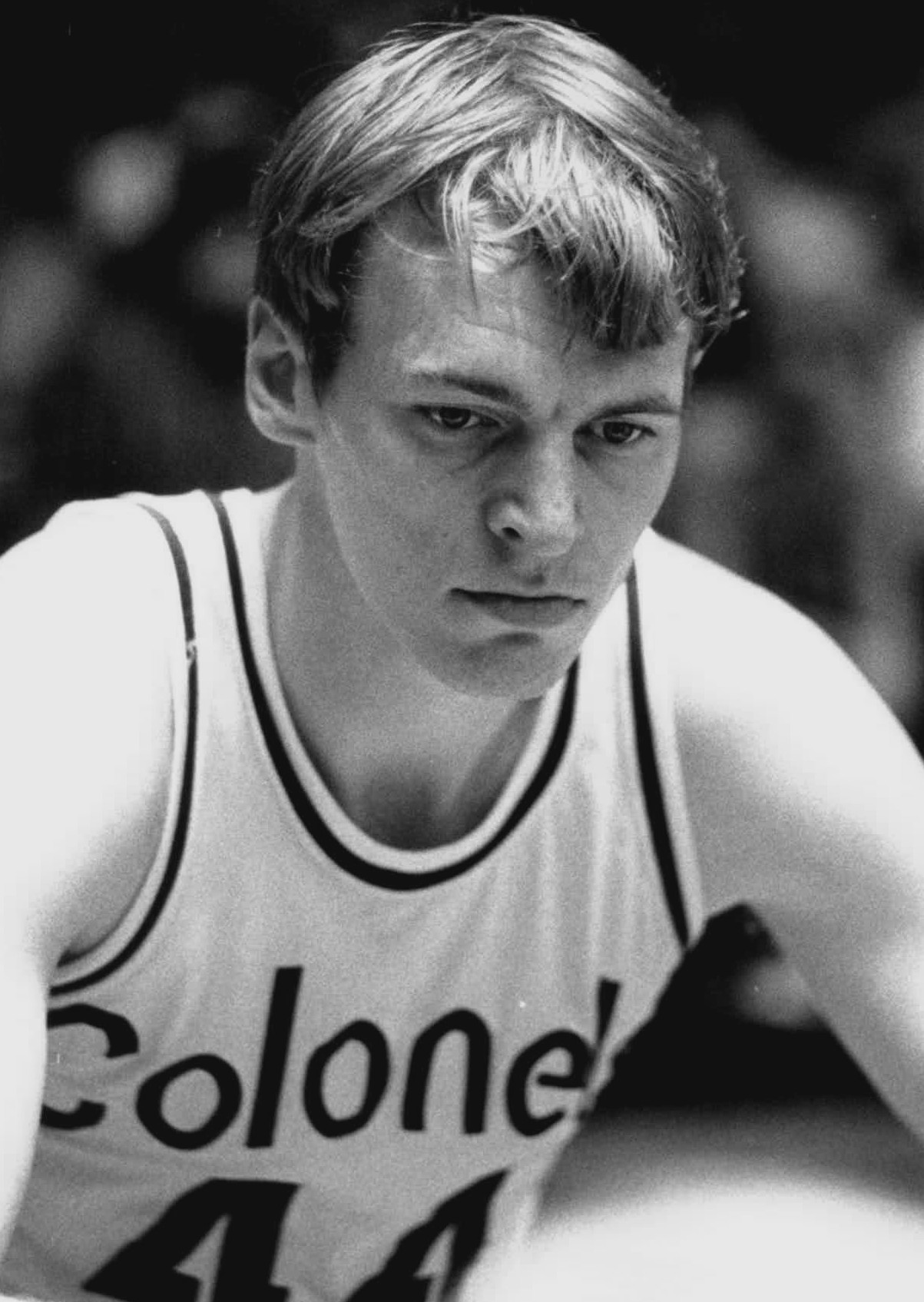
Dan Issel was selected as the 4th pick in the first round (fifth overall pick) of the 1970 ABA Draft by the Kentucky Colonels.

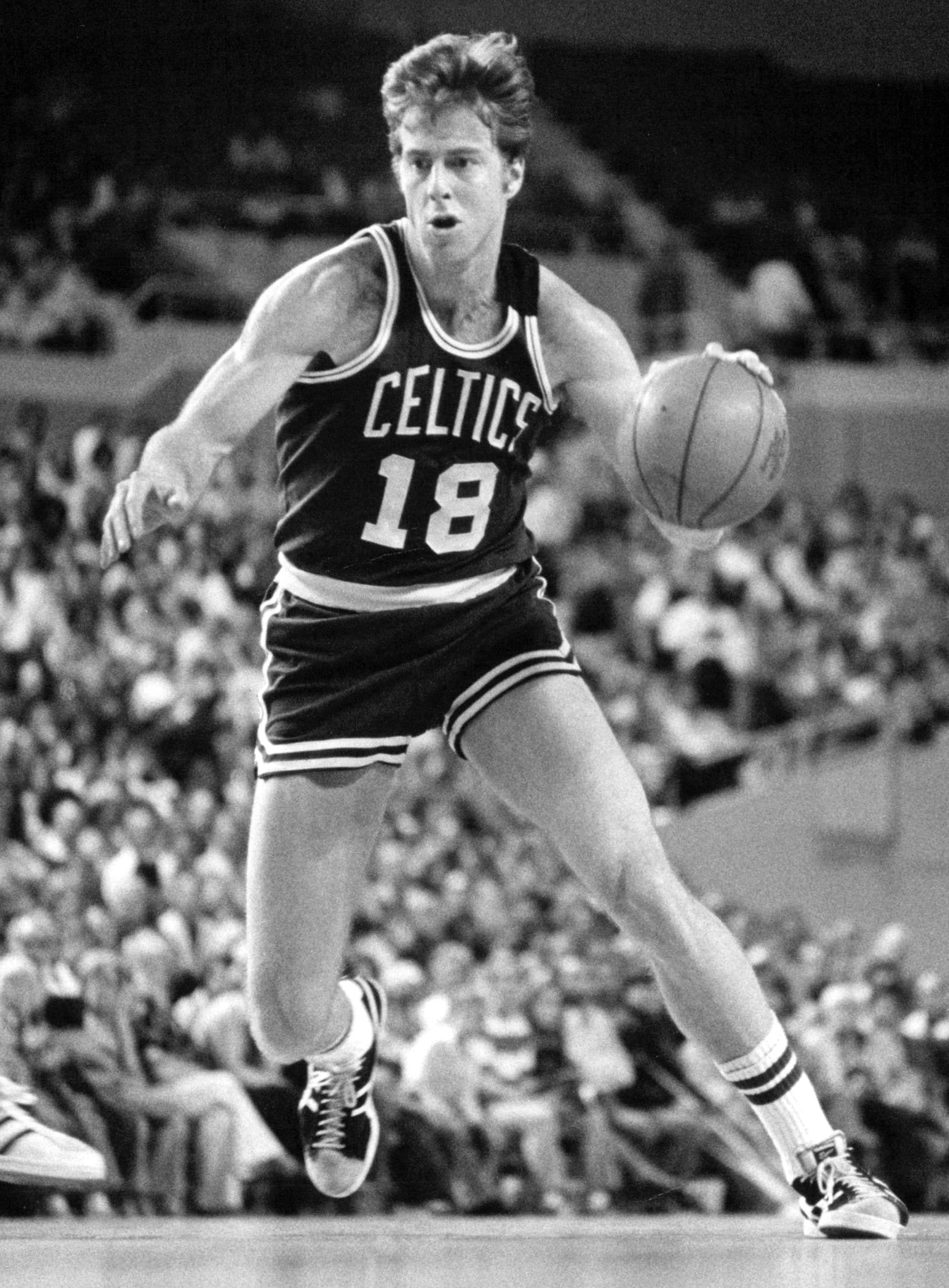
Dave Cowens was selected as the 5th pick in the first round (sixth overall pick) of the 1970 ABA Draft by the Los Angeles Stars (who later became the Utah Stars after the end of this draft period).

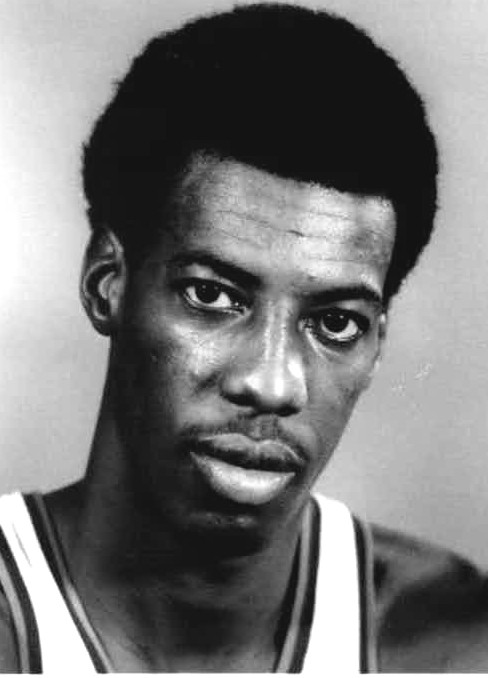
Charlie Scott was selected as the 8th pick in the first round (ninth overall pick) of the 1970 ABA Draft by the Washington Caps (who later became the Virginia Squires after the end of this draft period).

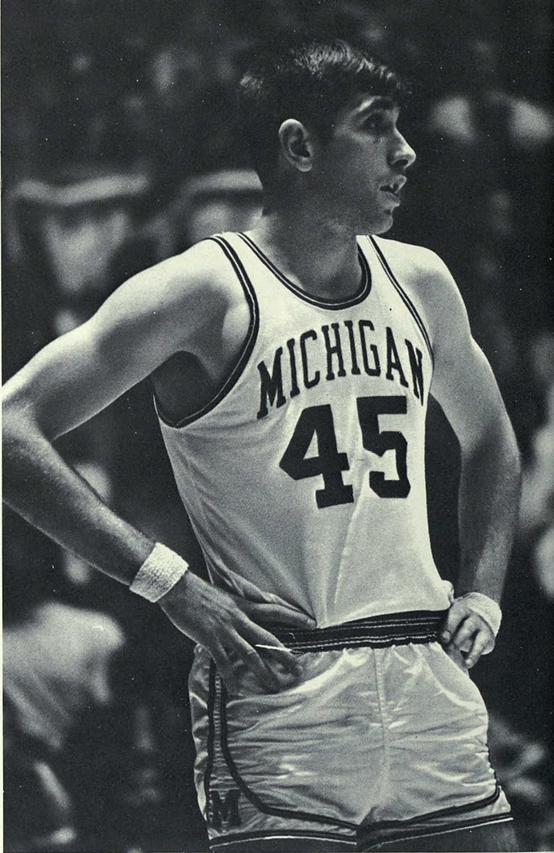
Rudy Tomjanovich was selected as the 9th pick in the first round (tenth overall pick) of the 1970 ABA Draft by the Miami Floridians (who later became "The Floridians" after the end of this draft period).

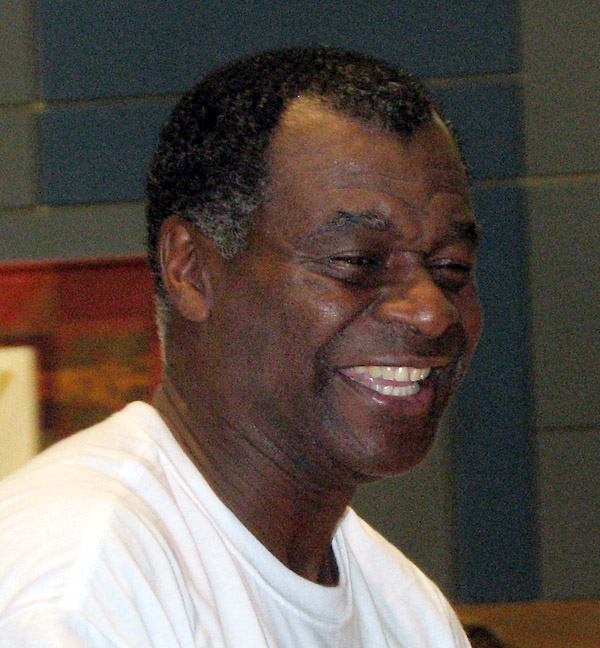
Calvin Murphy was selected as the 12th overall pick (second pick in the second round) of the 1970 ABA Draft by the Pittsburgh Pipers (who later became the Pittsburgh Condors after the end of this draft period).

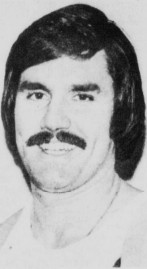
Wendell Ladner was selected as the 19th overall pick (ninth pick in the second round) of the 1970 ABA Draft by the New Orleans Buccaneers (who later became the Memphis Pros after the end of this draft period).

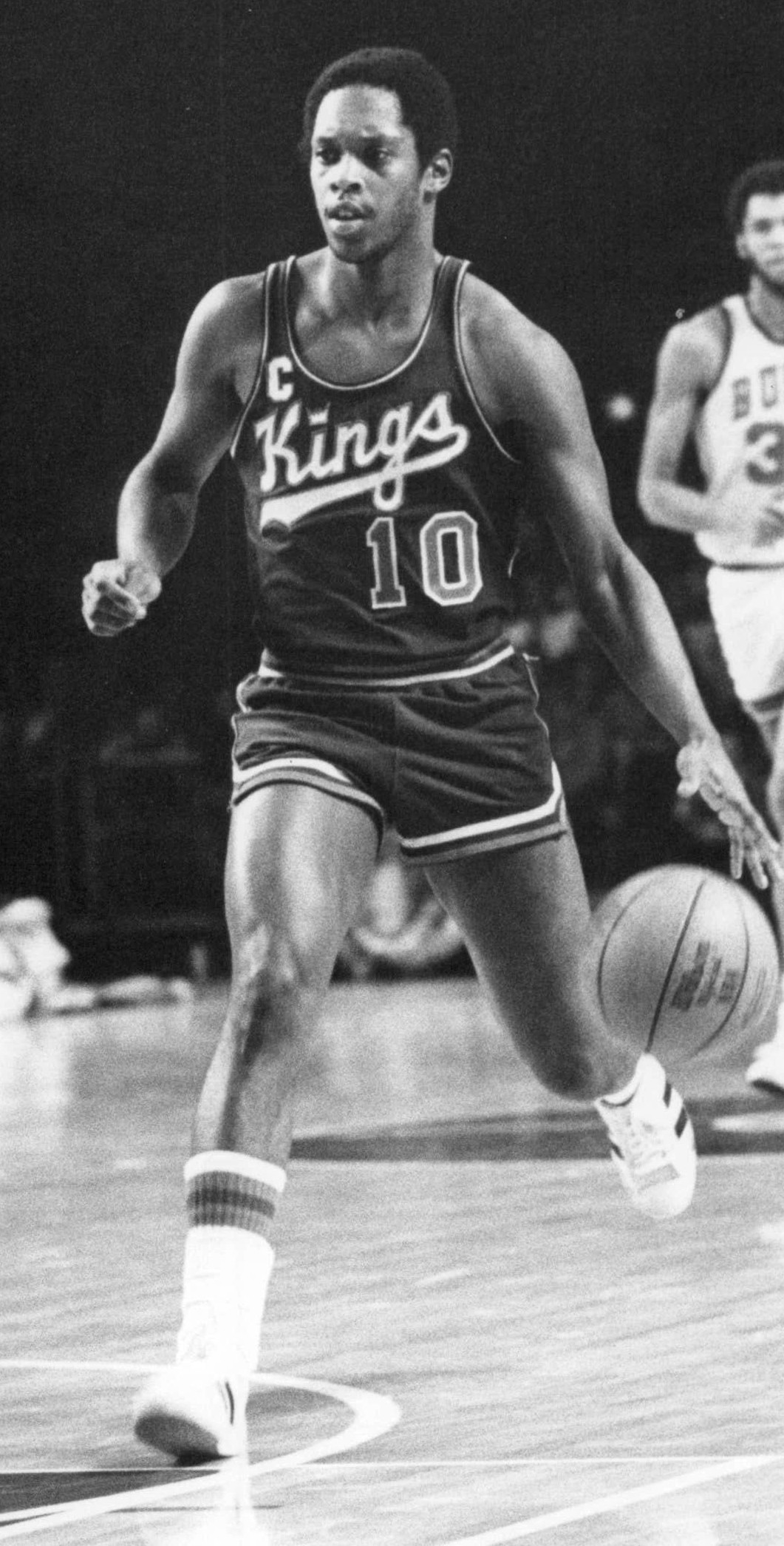
Nate Archibald was likely selected in the fourth round of the 1970 ABA Draft by the Dallas Chaparrals (who later became the Texas Chaparrals after the end of this draft period).

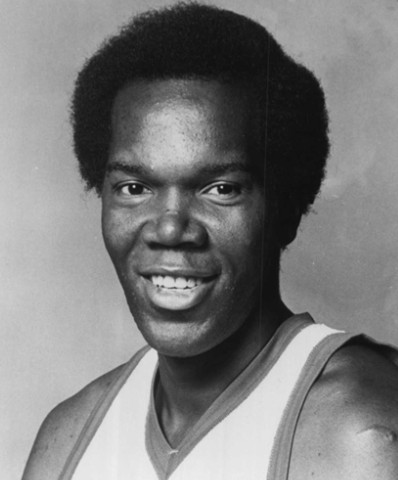
Ralph Simpson was acquired by the Denver Rockets under a "hardship exception" after the 1970 ABA Draft concluded, similar to Spencer Haywood the previous year. He would also cause the Rockets to forfeit their own first round pick in the following year's draft, similar to Haywood as well.

Carolina Cougars
First five rounds:

- Round 1, Pick 1: Pete Maravich, Louisiana State University (Sr.)
- Round 2, Pick 4: Bob Lienhard, University of Georgia (Sr.)
- Round 3, Pick 3: Gary Freeman, Oregon State University (Sr.) [acquired via trade from Washington]
- #4. Greg McDivit, Ohio University (Sr.)
- #5. Vann Williford, North Carolina State University (Sr.)

Extra Rounds (each round is not specified):

- Paul Adams Jr., Central Washington State College (Sr.)
- Carl Johnson, Gustavus Adolphus College (Sr.)
- Earnie Killum, John B. Stetson University (Sr.)
- Wayne Sokolowski, Ashland College (Sr.)
- Don Adams, Northwestern University (Sr.)
- Narvis Anderson, Stephen F. Austin State University (Sr.)
- John Fultz, University of Rhode Island (Sr.)
- Chuck Lloyd, Yankton College (Sr.)
- Jim Signorile, New York University (Sr.)

Dallas Chaparrals
First five rounds:

- Round 1, Pick 2: Bobby Croft, University of Tennessee (Sr.)
- Round 2, Pick 8: Emmanuel Cannon, Grambling College (Sr.)
- Round 3, Pick 6: John Johnson, University of Iowa (Sr.)
- #4. Nate Archibald, University of Texas at El Paso (Sr.)
- #5. Joe Hamilton, North Texas State University (Sr.)
- Bonus #5 pick at hand: Stan Love, University of Oregon (Jr.)

Extra Rounds (each round is not specified):

- Michael Bernard, Kentucky State College (Sr.)
- Bill Cain, Iowa State University (Sr.)
- Randall Caussey, McMurry College (Sr.)
- Al Henry, University of Wisconsin (Sr.)
- Steve Patterson, UCLA (Jr.)
- Glenn Vidnovic, University of Iowa (Sr.)
- Paul Brown, Arkansas Polytechnic College (Sr.)
- Ron Pitts, Wiley College (Sr.)

Denver Rockets
First five rounds:

- Forfeited official first-round pick due to them signing Spencer Haywood‡ last year.
- Round 2, Pick 6: John Vallely, UCLA (Sr.)
- Round 3, Pick 7: Greg Hyder, Eastern New Mexico University (Sr.)
- #4. Bob St. Pierre, Hanover College (Sr.)
- #5. Greg Daust, University of Missouri–St. Louis (So.)
- Bonus #5 pick at hand: Dan Hester, Louisiana State University (Sr.)

Extra Rounds:

- #6. John Marren, Manhattan College (Sr.)
- Bonus #6 pick at hand: Larry Mikan, University of Minnesota (Sr.)
- #7. Joe McBride, Augusta College (Sr.)
- #8. Ron Becker, University of New Mexico (Sr.)
- #9. Jim Penix, Bowling Green State University (Sr.)
- #10. Mike Price, University of Illinois (Sr.)
- #11. Ken Warzynski, DePaul University (Sr.)
- #12. Fred Taylor, Pan American College (Sr.)

Indiana Pacers
First five rounds:

- Round 1, Pick 3: Rick Mount, Purdue University (Sr.)
- Round 2, Pick 11: Dennis Awtrey, Santa Clara University (Sr.)
- Round 3, Pick 10: Joe Hamilton, North Texas State University (Sr.) [acquired via trade from Kentucky]
- #4. Vince Fritz, Oregon State University (Sr.)
- #5. Surry Oliver, Stephen F. Austin State University (Sr.)

Extra Rounds (each round is not specified):

- Don Curnutt, University of Miami (Florida) (Sr.)
- Rick Erickson, Washington State University (Sr.)
- Billy Jones, Louisiana College (Sr.)
- Jerry Kroll, Davidson College (Sr.)
- Bob Riley, Mount St. Mary's College (Sr.)
- Heyward Dotson, Columbia University (Sr.)
- Mickey Foster, University of Arizona (Sr.)
- Seabern Hill, Arizona State University (Sr.)
- Ted Hillary, Saint Joseph's College (Indiana) (Sr.)
- Jeff Sewell, Marquette University (Sr.)

Kentucky Colonels
First five rounds:

- Round 1, Pick 4: Dan Issel, University of Kentucky (Sr.)‡
- Round 2, Pick 10: Claude Virden, Murray State University (Sr.)
- Round 3, Pick 8: Mike Pratt, University of Kentucky (Sr.)
- #4. Pete Cross, University of San Francisco (Sr.)
- #5. Howie Wright, Austin Peay State University (Sr.)

Extra Rounds (each round is not specified):

- Joe Bergman, Creighton University (Jr.)
- Mike Casey, University of Kentucky (Jr.)
- Tom Rose, Northern Michigan University (Sr.)
- Charlie Wallace, Oklahoma City University (Sr.)
- Al Williams, Drake University (Sr.)
- Doug "Skip" Hess, University of Toledo (Jr.)
- Perry Wallace, Vanderbilt University (Sr.)
- Lou West, Seattle University (Sr.)
- Willie Woods, Eastern Kentucky University (Sr.)

Los Angeles Stars
First five rounds:

- Round 1, Pick 5: Dave Cowens, Florida State University (Sr.)
- Round 2, Pick 5: Jim McMillian, Columbia University (Sr.)
- Round 3, Pick 5: Dave Sorenson, Ohio State University (Sr.) [acquired via trade from New Orleans]
- #4. Carl Ashley, University of Wyoming (Sr.)
- Bonus #4 pick at hand: Jimmy Collins, New Mexico State University (Sr.)
- #5. Fred Davis, Howard Payne College (Sr.)

Extra Rounds (each round is not specified):

- Stan Dodds, University of Wyoming (Sr.)
- Virgle Fredrick, Drury College (Sr.)
- Ralph Ogden, Santa Clara University (Sr.)
- Cisco Oliver, Elizabeth City State University (Sr.)
- Bill Stricker, University of the Pacific (Sr.)
- Kevin Wilson, Ashland College (Sr.)
- Bruce Chapman, UNLV (Sr.)
- Denis Clark, Springfield College (Jr.)
- Ron Knight, California State College at Los Angeles (Sr.)
- Robert Moore, Central State University (Sr.)
- Lou Small, UNLV (Sr.)

Miami Floridians
First three rounds:

- Round 1, Pick 9: Rudy Tomjanovich, University of Michigan (Sr.) [acquired via trade from Los Angeles]
- Round 2, Pick 1: John Hummer, Princeton University (Sr.)
- Round 3, Pick 1: Sam Robinson, California State College at Long Beach (Sr.)

Extra Rounds (each round is not specified):

- Clarence Ellis, Albany State College (Sr.)
- Levi Fontaine, Maryland State College (Sr.)
- Walt Gilmore, Fort Valley State College (Sr.)
- John McKinney, Norfolk State College (Sr.)
- Fran O'Hanlon, Villanova University (Sr.)
- Dan Sager, Kentucky State College (Sr.)
- Gary Zeller, Drake University (Sr.)
- Rubin Daniels, Cheyney State College (Sr.)

New Orleans Buccaneers
First five rounds:

- Round 1, Pick 6: Sam Lacey, New Mexico State University (Sr.)
- Round 2, Pick 9: Wendell Ladner, University of Southern Mississippi (Sr.)
- Round 3, Pick 9: George E. Johnson, Stephen F. Austin State University (Sr.)
- #4. Gar Heard, University of Oklahoma (Sr.)

Extra Rounds (each round is not specified):

- Charles Bishop, Louisiana Polytechnic Institute (Sr.)
- Coby Dietrick, San Jose State College (Sr.)
- George T. Johnson, Dillard University (Sr.)
- Robert "Bob" Mabry, Rio Grande College (Sr.)
- Marv Winkler, University of Southwestern Louisiana (Sr.)
- Ron Coleman, University of Mississippi (Sr.)
- Frank Lorthridge, Pan American College (Jr.)
- Andrew Owens, University of Florida (Sr.)

New York Nets
First five rounds:

- Round 1, #1. Territorial Pick: Bob Lanier, St. Bonaventure University (Sr.)
- Round 2, Pick 3: Geoff Petrie, Princeton University (Sr.)
- Round 3, Pick 2: Jim Ard, University of Cincinnati (Sr.)
- #4. Doug Cook, Davidson College (Sr.)
- #5. Jim Hayes, Boston University (Sr.)

Extra Rounds (each round is not specified):

- Joe DePre, St. John's University (Sr.)
- Harvey Marlatt, Eastern Michigan University (Sr.)
- Rod McIntyre, Jacksonville University (Sr.)
- Carlton Poole, Philadelphia College of Textiles & Science (Sr.)
- Ollie Taylor, University of Houston (Sr.)
- Dale Kelley, Northwestern University (Sr.)
- Ken Macklin, Florida State University (Sr.)
- Erwin Polnick, Stephen F. Austin State University (Sr.)
- Mike Switzer, University of Texas at El Paso (Sr.)
- Jerry Venable, Kansas State University (Sr.)

Pittsburgh Pipers
First five rounds:

- Round 1, Pick 7: Mike Maloy, Davidson College (Sr.)
- Round 2, Pick 2: Calvin Murphy, Niagara University (Sr.)
- Round 3, Pick 11: Rex Morgan, Jacksonville University (Sr.)
- #4. Vic Bartolome, Oregon State University (Sr.)
- Bonus #4 pick at hand: Don Ogletree, University of Cincinnati (Sr.)
- #5. George Janky, University of Dayton (Sr.)
- Bonus #5 pick at hand: Cornell Warner, Jackson State College (Sr.)

Extra Rounds (each round is not specified):

- Lou Herndon, Jackson State College (Sr.)
- Lavern Howard, Grambling College (Sr.)
- Bill Jankans, California State College at Long Beach (Sr.)
- Robert Kornegay, Hampton Institute (Sr.)
- Boyd Lynch, Eastern Kentucky University (Sr.)
- Willie Watson, Oklahoma City University (Sr.)
- Jim Wilson, Cheyney State College (Sr.)
- Bill Zopf, Duquesne University (Sr.)

Washington Caps
First five rounds:

- Round 1, Pick 8: Charlie Scott, University of North Carolina (Sr.)‡
- Round 2, Pick 7: Greg Howard, Brill Cagliari (Italy)
- Round 3, Pick 4: George Irvine, University of Washington (Sr.)
- #4. James Gilbert, Adams State College (Sr.)
- #5. Billy Paultz, St. John's University (Sr.)‡

Extra Rounds (each round is not specified):

- Tommy Carter, Paul Quinn College (Sr.)
- Tom Everette, Carson–Newman College (Sr.)
- Curtis Perry, Southwest Missouri State College (Sr.)
- Paul Ruffner, Brigham Young University (Sr.)
- Will Teague, Youngstown State University (Sr.)
- Charles Bloodworth, Northwestern State College of Louisiana (Sr.)
- Leon Edmonds, Portland State University (Sr.)
- Andy Jennings, Alderson-Broaddus College (Sr.)
- George Jerman, Western New England College (Fr.)
- Scott Warner, Brigham Young University (Sr.)

=== Notable undrafted players ===
These players were officially considered draft eligible for the 1970 ABA draft and went undrafted this year, yet played at least one regular season or playoff game for the ABA before the ABA-NBA merger actually commenced a few years later when it ultimately happened much later than the ABA had anticipated it to occur in 1976, despite talks beginning as early as this year.

Player	Pos.	Nationality	School
Walker Banks	C	United States	Western Kentucky (Sr.)
Earle Higgins	PF	United States	Eastern Michigan (Sr.)
Lonnie Kluttz	F	United States	North Carolina A&T State (Sr.)
Ralph Simpson*	SG/SF	United States	Michigan State (So.)
Samuel Watts	SG	United States	College of Great Falls (Sr.)
Steve Wilson	SG	United States	Hanover (Sr.)
