= 1970–71 Carolina Cougars season =

ABA basketball team season

- Head coach: Bones McKinney (17-25); Jerry Steele (17-25)
- Arena: Greensboro Coliseum; Charlotte Coliseum; Dorton Arena

Results
- Record: 34–50 (.405)
- Place: Division: 6th

The 1970–71 Carolina Cougars season was the 2nd season of the Cougars in the ABA. The Cougars finished dead last in the Eastern Division, though they missed the playoffs by 3 games. They finished 8th in point per game at 115.3 points per game, while finishing 6th in points allowed at 119.4 points per game. The team faltered near the end of the season, losing 11 straight games from February 25 to March 19. Their biggest win streak was 3, which they accomplished 5 times in the season.

During the regular season, the Cougars played 18 games in Greensboro, 12 in Charlotte, and 12 in Raleigh.

== Roster ==
1970–71 Carolina Cougars roster
Players

Pos.	No.	Player	Height	Weight	DOB	From
F	31	Gary Bradds	6 ft 8 in (2.03 m)	210 lb (95 kg)	July 26, 1942	Ohio State
SF	27	Joe Caldwell	6 ft 5 in (1.96 m)	195 lb (88 kg)	November 1, 1941	Arizona State
SF	13	Frank Card	6 ft 7 in (2.01 m)	195 lb (88 kg)	December 28, 1944	South Carolina State
G	34	Mack Daughtry	6 ft 3 in (1.91 m)	175 lb (79 kg)	July 20, 1946	Albany State
C	33	Ira Harge	6 ft 9 in (2.06 m)	225 lb (102 kg)	March 14, 1941	New Mexico
PF	12	Rich Johnson	6 ft 7 in (2.01 m)	210 lb (95 kg)	December 18, 1946	Grambling State
G		Arvesta Kelly	6 ft 2 in (1.88 m)	175 lb (79 kg)	November 20, 1945	Lincoln (MO)
F	13	Lonnie Kluttz	6 ft 7 in (2.01 m)	220 lb (100 kg)	September 17, 1945	North Carolina A&T
PG	21	George Lehmann	6 ft 0 in (1.83 m)	180 lb (82 kg)	May 1, 1941	Campbell
PG	23	Gene Littles	6 ft 0 in (1.83 m)	160 lb (73 kg)	June 29, 1943	High Point
C	22	Chuck Lloyd	6 ft 8 in (2.03 m)	220 lb (100 kg)	May 22, 1947	Yankton College
SF	35	Randolph Mahaffey	6 ft 7 in (2.01 m)	210 lb (95 kg)	September 28, 1945	Clemson
SG	44	Larry Miller	6 ft 4 in (1.93 m)	190 lb (86 kg)	1946-04-04	North Carolina
C	24	Dave Newmark	7 ft 0 in (2.13 m)	240 lb (109 kg)	September 11, 1946	Columbia
C	43	George Peeples	6 ft 7 in (2.01 m)	190 lb (86 kg)	October 30, 1943	Iowa
SG	11	Bob Verga	6 ft 1 in (1.85 m)	190 lb (86 kg)	September 7, 1945	Duke
SF	14	Vann Williford	6 ft 6 in (1.98 m)	195 lb (88 kg)	January 26, 1948	NC State

Coaches
Head coach
- Bones McKinney / Jerry Steele

Legend
- (DP) Unsigned draft pick
- (FA) Free agent
- (S) Suspended
- Injured

Roster

== Final standings ==
=== Eastern Division ===
Team	W	L	PCT.	GB
Virginia Squires	55	29	.655	-
Kentucky Colonels	44	40	.524	11.0
New York Nets	40	44	.476	15.0
The Floridians	37	47	.440	18.0
Pittsburgh Condors	36	48	.429	19.0
Carolina Cougars	34	50	.405	21.0

== Awards, records, and honors ==
1971 ABA All-Star Game played on January 23, 1971, at Greensboro Coliseum in Greensboro, North Carolina.

- Joe Caldwell
