= 1970–71 Pittsburgh Condors season =

- Head coach: Jack McMahon
- Arena: Pittsburgh Civic Arena

Results
- Record: 36–48 (.429)
- Place: Division: 5th (Eastern)
- Playoff finish: Did not qualify

The 1970–71 Pittsburgh Condors season was the first season of the franchise under the Pittsburgh Condors name, the third overall season of Pittsburgh's tenure in the American Basketball Association, and their fourth overall season of play when including their one season when they moved to the state of Minnesota to become the Minnesota Pipers at the time.

== History ==
Haven Industries (makers of the Jack Frost sugar brand) bought this team after the previous season and decided to rename it. After launching a naming contest, with a prize of $500, the winning selection was "Pioneers"; however, Point Park College, a NAIA-affiliated college that was located near the team offices, threatened legal action due to the college's historical use of the nickname for its own team. The pro team hastily came up with a replacement name, finally settling on the "Condors."

The first game of the season was played on October 15, 1970, against the New York Nets. The Condors won 105–102 in front of a crowd of 3,616; however, the low attendance figure was a harbinger of things to come. For the November 17th game versus the Floridians, general manager Marty Blake tried to spur crowd interest by giving away all available tickets for free. Of the 13,000 seats offered, 8,074 fans showed up. Later in the year, he was fired when the team's record declined below .500.

On March 6, 1971, Stew Johnson scored 62 points versus the Floridians, going 25 of 44 with one three-pointer made and eleven free throws. While the team's biggest losing streak (done twice) was only four games, the team simply could not maintain a winning streak longer than three games, with the team being reassured of a below .500 finish after losing on March 13, just nine games before the end of the season.

The team was in contention for the final spot in the playoffs, however, during a contest against the Floridians (36–46), in the penultimate game for both teams (played on March 28) that could seal the playoff spot, as the Condors had a 35–47 record. The team lost 130–117 to the Floridians, though, sealing its fate.

Two days later, its season ended, with Pittsburgh having missed a playoff berth for another consecutive year. It finished fifth in points scored, with a 119.1 points per game average. Conversely, it finished eighth in points allowed at 121.8 points per game.

== Roster ==
1970–71 Pittsburgh Condors roster
Players

Pos.	No.	Player	Height	Weight	DOB	From
C	22	Walker Banks	6 ft 10 in (2.08 m)	205 lb (93 kg)	August 26, 1947	Western Kentucky
SF	23, 40	John Brisker	6 ft 5 in (1.96 m)	210 lb (95 kg)	June 15, 1947	Toledo
PF	21	Charlie Hentz	6 ft 5 in (1.96 m)	210 lb (95 kg)	September 13, 1947	Arkansas–Pine Bluff
C	15	Rich Johnson	6 ft 7 in (2.01 m)	210 lb (95 kg)	December 18, 1946	Grambling State
PF	13	Stew Johnson	6 ft 8 in (2.03 m)	220 lb (100 kg)	August 19, 1944	Murray State
G	14	Arvesta Kelly	6 ft 2 in (1.88 m)	175 lb (79 kg)	November 20, 1945	Lincoln (MO)
SF	12	Joe Kennedy	6 ft 6 in (1.98 m)	210 lb (95 kg)	January 12, 1947	Duke
PF	33	Dave Lattin	6 ft 6 in (1.98 m)	225 lb (102 kg)	December 23, 1943	UTEP
G		Harry Laurie	6 ft 1 in (1.85 m)	178 lb (81 kg)	November 2, 1944	Saint Peter's College
C	24	Mike Lewis	6 ft 8 in (2.03 m)	225 lb (102 kg)	March 18, 1946	Duke
C	15	Ken Spain	6 ft 9 in (2.06 m)	225 lb (102 kg)	October 6, 1946	Houston
SG	23	Skeeter Swift	6 ft 3 in (1.91 m)	204 lb (93 kg)	June 19, 1946	East Tennessee State
SG	25	George Thompson	6 ft 2 in (1.88 m)	200 lb (91 kg)	November 29, 1947	Marquette
SG	32	Samuel Watts	6 ft 3 in (1.91 m)	185 lb (84 kg)	March 14, 1948	University of Great Falls
SG	14	Hubie White	6 ft 4 in (1.93 m)	205 lb (93 kg)	January 26, 1940	Villanova
PG	44	Charlie Williams	6 ft 0 in (1.83 m)	165 lb (75 kg)	September 5, 1943	Seattle
PG	10	Chuck Williams	6 ft 2 in (1.88 m)	175 lb (79 kg)	June 6, 1946	Colorado
G	14	Jim Wilson	5 ft 10 in (1.78 m)	175 lb (79 kg)	1948	Cheyney

Coaches
Head coach
- Jack McMahon

Legend
- (DP) Unsigned draft pick
- (FA) Free agent
- (S) Suspended
- Injured

Roster

== Final standings ==
=== Eastern Division ===
Eastern Division	W	L	PCT	GB
Virginia Squires *	55	29	.655	
Kentucky Colonels *	44	40	.524	11.0
New York Nets *	40	44	.476	15.0
The Floridians *	37	47	.440	18.0
Pittsburgh Condors	36	48	.429	19.0
Carolina Cougars	34	50	.405	21.0

== Awards and honors ==
1971 ABA All-Star Game selections (game played on January 23, 1971)

- John Brisker
- Mike Lewis
