= Milwaukee Bucks draft history =

Professional basketball draft history

In their 56-year history, the Milwaukee Bucks have selected the following players in the National Basketball Association draft.

== Players Drafted ==
Naismith Basketball Hall of Famer	First overall NBA draft pick	Selected for an NBA All-Star Game

Year	Round	Pick	Name	From
2024	1	23	AJ Johnson	Illawarra Hawks (Australia)
2024	2	33	Tyler Smith	G League Ignite (United States)
2023	2	58	Chris Livingston	Kentucky
2022	1	24	MarJon Beauchamp	G League Ignite (United States)
2021	2	31	Isaiah Todd	G League Ignite (United States)
2020	1	24	R. J. Hampton	Breakers (Australia)
2020	2	45	Jordan Nwora	University of Louisville
2019	1	30	Kevin Porter Jr.	University of Southern California
2018	1	17	Donte DiVincenzo	Villanova University
2017	1	17	D. J. Wilson	University of Michigan
2017	2	48	Sindarius Thornwell	University of South Carolina
2016	1	10	Thon Maker	Orangeville Prep
2016	2	38	Patrick McCaw	University of Nevada, Las Vegas
2016	2	36	Malcolm Brogdon	University of Virginia
2015	1	17	Rashad Vaughn	University of Nevada, Las Vegas
2015	2	46	Norman Powell	University of California, Los Angeles
2014	1	2	Jabari Parker	Duke University
2014	2	31	Damien Inglis	Chorale Roanne Basket (France)
2014	2	36	Johnny O'Bryant III	Louisiana State University
2014	2	48	Lamar Patterson	University of Pittsburgh
2013	1	15	Giannis Antetokounmpo	Filathlitikos B.C. (Greece)
2013	2	43	Ricky Ledo	Providence College (Note: Although Ricky Ledo enrolled at Providence, he was declared academically ineligible by the NCAA due to not having enough college credits. Because he was already one year out of high school, Ledo was still credited by the NBA as a player that came out of college as opposed to high school.)
2012	2	42	Doron Lamb	University of Kentucky
2012	1	14	John Henson	University of North Carolina
2011	1	10	Jimmer Fredette	BYU
2011	2	40	Jon Leuer	University of Wisconsin–Madison
2010	1	15	Larry Sanders	Virginia Commonwealth University
2010	2	37	Darington Hobson	University of New Mexico
2010	2	44	Jerome Jordan	University of Tulsa
2010	2	47	Tiny Gallon	University of Oklahoma
2009	1	10	Brandon Jennings	Lottomatica Roma (Italy)
2009	2	41	Jodie Meeks	University of Kentucky
2008	1	8	Joe Alexander	West Virginia University
2008	2	37	Luc Richard Mbah a Moute	University of California, Los Angeles
2007	1	6	Yi Jianlian	Guangdong Southern Tigers (China)
2007	2	56	Ramon Sessions	University of Nevada, Reno
2006	2	39	David Noel	University of North Carolina
2005	1	1	Andrew Bogut	University of Utah
2005	2	36	Ersan İlyasova	Ülkerspor (Turkey)
2003	1	8	T. J. Ford	University of Texas at Austin
2003	2	35	Szymon Szewczyk	Braunschweig (Germany)
2003	2	43	Keith Bogans	University of Kentucky
2002	1	13	Marcus Haislip	University of Tennessee
2002	2	33	Dan Gadzuric	University of California, Los Angeles
2002	2	41	Ronald Murray	Shaw University
2002	2	47	Chris Owens	University of Texas at Austin
2001	2	51	Andre Hutson	Michigan State University
2000	1	15	Jason Collier	Georgia Institute of Technology
2000	2	43	Michael Redd	Ohio State University
2000	2	49	Jason Hart	Syracuse University
1999	2	48	Galen Young	University of North Carolina at Charlotte
1998	1	9	Dirk Nowitzki	DJK Würzburg (Germany)
1998	1	19	Pat Garrity	University of Notre Dame
1998	2	39	Rafer Alston	California State University, Fresno
1997	1	10	Danny Fortson	University of Cincinnati
1997	2	38	Jerald Honeycutt	Tulane University
1996	1	4	Stephon Marbury	Georgia Institute of Technology
1996	2	33	Moochie Norris	University of West Florida
1996	2	53	Jeff Nordgaard	University of Wisconsin–Green Bay
1995	1	11	Gary Trent	Ohio University
1995	2	38	Rashard Griffith	University of Wisconsin–Madison
1995	2	43	Eric Snow	Michigan State University
1994	1	1	Glenn Robinson	Purdue University
1994	1	18	Eric Mobley	University of Pittsburgh
1994	2	46	Voshon Lenard	University of Minnesota
1993	1	8	Vin Baker	University of Hartford
1992	1	8	Todd Day	University of Arkansas
1992	1	23	Lee Mayberry	University of Arkansas
1991	1	18	Kevin Brooks	University of Louisiana at Lafayette
1991	2	45	Bobby Phills	Southern University
1990	1	16	Terry Mills	University of Michigan
1990	2	44	Steve Henson	Kansas State University
1989	2	30	Frank Kornet	Vanderbilt University
1988	1	13	Jeff Grayer	Iowa State University
1988	2	39	Tito Horford	University of Miami
1988	3	63	Mike Jones	Auburn University
1987	2	32	Bob McCann	Morehead State University
1987	2	40	Winston Garland	Missouri State University
1987	3	64	J. J. Weber	University of Wisconsin–Madison
1987	4	87	Darryl Bedford	Austin Peay State University
1987	5	110	Brian Vaughns	University of California, Santa Barbara
1987	6	133	Gay Elmore	Virginia Military Institute
1986	1	22	Scott Skiles	Michigan State University
1986	2	45	Keith Smith	Loyola Marymount University
1986	3	68	Baskerville Holmes	University of Memphis
1986	5	114	Bobby Deaton	Southwestern University
1986	6	137	John Kimbrell	Lipscomb University
1986	7	160	Jeff Strong	University of Missouri
1985	1	22	Jerry Reynolds	Louisiana State University
1985	3	68	Eugene McDowell	University of Florida
1985	4	91	Cozell McQueen	North Carolina State University
1985	5	114	Ray Knight	Providence College
1985	6	137	Quentin Anderson	Texas Tech University
1985	7	160	Mario Elie	American International College
1984	1	21	Kenny Fields	University of California, Los Angeles
1984	3	67	Vernon Delancy	University of Florida
1984	5	113	Ernie Floyd	College of the Holy Cross
1984	6	120	McKinley Singleton	University of Alabama at Birmingham
1984	6	136	Mike Reddick	Stetson University
1984	7	159	Tony William	Florida State University
1984	8	182	Brad Jergenson	University of South Carolina
1984	9	204	Edwin Green	University of Massachusetts Amherst
1984	10	226	Mike Toomer	Florida Agricultural and Mechanical University
1983	1	18	Randy Breuer	University of Minnesota
1983	2	41	Ted Kitchel	Indiana University
1983	2	42	Mike Davis	University of Alabama
1983	3	65	Billy Goodwin	St. John's University
1983	4	88	Mark Nickens	American University
1983	5	111	Mark Petteway	University of New Orleans
1983	6	120	Russell Todd	West Virginia University
1983	6	134	Charles Hurt	University of Kentucky
1983	7	157	Anthony Hicks	Xavier University
1983	8	180	Brett Burkholder	DePaul University
1983	9	202	Bill Varner	University of Notre Dame
1983	10	223	Bob Kelly	St. John's University
1982	1	20	Paul Pressey	University of Tulsa
1982	2	27	Fred Roberts	Brigham Young University
1982	4	89	Jerry Beck	Middle Tennessee State University
1982	6	135	Tony Carr	University of Wisconsin–Eau Claire
1982	7	158	Bobby Austin	University of Cincinnati
1982	8	181	Bryan Leonard	University of Illinois at Urbana–Champaign
1982	9	202	Robert Tate	Idaho State University
1982	10	223	Bob Coenen	University of Wisconsin–Eau Claire
1981	1	21	Alton Lister	Arizona State University
1981	3	67	Mark Smith	University of Illinois at Urbana–Champaign
1981	4	90	Kris Anderson	Florida State University
1981	5	113	Kelvin Troy	Rutgers University
1981	6	136	Jo Jo Hunter	University of Colorado
1981	7	159	Lewis Latimore	University of Virginia
1981	8	181	Mike Brkovich	Michigan State University
1981	9	201	Chip Rucker	Northeastern University
1981	10	221	Artie Green	Marquette University
1980	3	63	Al Beal	University of Oklahoma
1980	4	86	Jeff Wolf	University of North Carolina
1980	5	109	Ken Jones	Virginia Commonwealth University
1980	6	132	Alex Gilbert	Indiana State University
1980	7	155	Ron White	Furman University
1980	8	174	Keith Valentine	Virginia Union University
1980	9	194	Del Yarbrough	Illinois State University
1980	10	210	Melvin Crayton	Alabama State University
1979	1	5	Sidney Moncrief	University of Arkansas
1979	2	31	Edgar Jones	University of Nevada, Reno
1979	3	52	Larry Gibson	University of Maryland
1979	4	69	Eugene Robinson	University of Louisiana at Monroe
1979	5	97	Jim Tillman	Eastern Kentucky University
1979	6	116	Derrick Mayes	Illinois State University
1979	7	138	Stan Ray	California State University, Fullerton
1979	8	156	Larry Spicer	University of Alabama at Birmingham
1979	9	174	Roger Lapham	University of Maine
1979	10	193	Chris Fahrbach	University of North Dakota
1978	1	12	George Johnson	St. John's University
1978	3	59	Pat Cummings	University of Cincinnati
1978	4	80	Otis Howard	Austin Peay State University
1978	5	103	Russ Coleman	University of the Pacific
1978	6	124	Dave Kyle	Cleveland State University
1978	7	146	Kim Anderson	University of Missouri
1978	8	164	Tom Zaligaris	University of North Carolina
1978	9	182	Gary Rosenberger	Marquette University
1978	10	196	Tom Anderson	University of Wisconsin–Green Bay
1977	1	1	Kent Benson	Indiana University
1977	1	3	Marques Johnson	University of California, Los Angeles
1977	1	11	Ernie Grunfeld	University of Tennessee
1977	2	27	Glenn Williams	St. John's University
1977	3	47	Gary Yoder	University of Cincinnati
1977	4	69	Lewis Brown	University of Nevada, Las Vegas
1977	5	91	Ron Norwood	DePaul University
1977	6	113	Chuck Goodyear	Miami University
1977	7	134	Ron Bostic	University of Detroit Mercy
1977	8	154	Larry Pikes	University of Wisconsin–Milwaukee
1976	1	7	Quinn Buckner	Indiana University
1976	2	23	Alex English	University of South Carolina
1976	2	24	Scott Lloyd	Arizona State University
1976	3	40	Lloyd Walton	Marquette University
1976	4	59	Dan Frost	University of Iowa
1976	5	75	Tom Lockhart	Manhattan College
1976	5	77	James Rappis	University of Arizona
1976	6	92	Phil Spence	North Carolina State University
1976	7	112	Ron Barrow	Southern University
1976	8	129	Bob Warner	University of Maine
1976	9	146	Benny Shaw	Florida Institute of Technology
1976	10	165	Hugo Cabrera	East Texas State University
1975	2	22	Clyde Mayes	Furman University
1975	2	24	Cornelius Cash	Bowling Green State University
1975	3	43	Brian Hammel	Bentley College (Note: Granted university status in 2008.)
1975	4	60	Bill Campion	Manhattan College
1975	6	96	Oliver Purnell	Old Dominion University
1975	7	115	Wilbur Thomas	American University
1975	8	132	Bob McCurdy	University of Richmond
1975	9	150	Eric Hays	University of Montana
1975	10	165	Romy Thomas	University of Wisconsin–Eau Claire
1974	1	18	Gary Brokaw	University of Notre Dame
1974	3	54	Greg McDougald	Oral Roberts University
1974	4	72	Lionel Billingy	Duquesne University
1974	5	90	John Johnson	University of Denver
1974	6	108	Larry Williams	Kansas State University
1974	7	126	Bob Hornstein	West Virginia University
1974	8	144	Ralph Palamar (Note: Anglicized spelling of Mexican player Rafael Palomar's name.)	Cameron University
1974	9	161	Mike Deane	State University of New York at Potsdam
1974	10	178	Bruce Featherston	Southwest Texas State University (Note: Adopted present name Texas State University on September 1, 2013.)
1973	1	16	Swen Nater	University of California, Los Angeles
1973	4	59	Clyde Turner	University of Minnesota
1973	4	67	Harry Rogers	Saint Louis University
1973	5	85	Larry Jackson	Northern Illinois University
1973	6	101	James Floyd	Shaw University
1973	7	119	Eddie Childress	Austin Peay State University
1973	8	135	Walt McGrary	University of Tennessee at Chattanooga
1973	9	150	Bob Bocca	Quinnipiac University
1973	10	164	Ron Battle	Sam Houston State University
1972	1	6	Russ Lee	Marshall University
1972	1	12	Julius Erving	University of Massachusetts Amherst
1972	2	29	Chuck Terry	California State University, Long Beach
1972	3	46	George Adams	Gardner–Webb University
1972	4	63	Art White	Georgetown University
1972	5	79	Ron Harris	Wichita State University
1972	7	113	Mickey Davis	Duquesne University
1972	8	129	Charles Kirkland	Cheyney University of Pennsylvania
1972	9	143	Jim Regenold	Ball State University
1972	10	156	Jolly Spight	Santa Clara University
1971	1	17	Collis Jones	University of Notre Dame
1971	3	51	Gary Brell	Marquette University
1971	4	68	Henry Smith	University of Missouri
1971	5	85	Barry Nelson	Duquesne University
1971	6	102	Ed Kemp	Adams State College
1971	7	119	Gene Phillips	Southern Methodist University
1971	8	136	Felix Thurston	Trinity University
1971	9	152	Rick Howat	University of Illinois at Urbana–Champaign
1971	10	168	Danny Fife	University of Michigan
1971	11	182	Blaine Henry	Marshall University
1971	12	195	Gene Mumford	University of Scranton
1971	13	207	Pierre Russell	University of Kansas
1971	14	216	George Jackson	University of Dayton
1971	15	224	Loyd King	Virginia Polytechnic Institute and State University
1970	1	16	Gary Freeman	Oregon State University
1970	2	33	Bill Zopf	Duquesne University
1970	3	50	Marv Winkler	University of Louisiana at Lafayette
1970	4	67	Virgle Fredricks	Drury University
1970	5	84	Mike Grosso	University of Louisville
1970	6	101	Willy Watson	Oklahoma City University
1970	7	118	John Rinka	Kenyon College
1970	8	135	Jim Samo	Northwestern University
1970	9	152	Joe Hamilton	North Texas State University (Note: Became the University of North Texas in 1988.)
1970	10	169	Bob Seemer	Georgia Institute of Technology
1969	1	1	Kareem Abdul-Jabbar	University of California, Los Angeles
1969	2	17	Bob Greacen	Rutgers University
1969	3	31	Skeeter Swift	East Tennessee State University
1969	4	45	Bob Dandridge	Norfolk State University
1969	5	59	Kenny Heitz	University of California, Los Angeles
1969	6	73	John Arthurs	Tulane University
1969	7	87	Billy Keller	Purdue University
1969	8	101	John Schell	University of Wisconsin–Madison
1969	9	115	Jim Satalin	St. Bonaventure University
1969	10	129	Willie Brown	Middle Tennessee State University
1969	11	143	Bob Presley	University of California
1969	12	157	Jack Lutz	Carthage College
1969	13	170	Lee Osgood	Northeastern University
1969	14	181	Laymon Stewart	Lakeland College (Wisconsin) (Note: Granted university status in 2016.)
1969	15	190	Stan Wiodarszek	La Salle University
1969	16	196	Bill Voigt	Southern Methodist University
1969	17	202	Lynn Phillips	Southern Methodist University
1969	18	208	Ken Hall	Westminster College of Pennsylvania
1968	1	7	Charlie Paulk	Northeastern State University
1968	2	22	Gene Moore	Saint Louis University
1968	3	35	Sam Williams	University of Iowa
1968	4	50	Greg Smith	Western Kentucky University
1968	5	63	Joe Franklin	University of Wisconsin–Madison
1968	6	78	Fred Smith	University of Hawaii
1968	7	91	Tom Kondla	University of Minnesota
1968	8	106	Elbert Miller	University of Nevada, Las Vegas
1968	9	119	Cliff Berger	University of Kentucky
1968	10	134	Eugene Jones	University of Missouri
1968	11	146	Brad Luchini	Marquette University
1968	12	159	Dave Miller	University of Florida
