= Earnie Killum =

American basketball player (1948–2020)

Personal information
- Born: June 11, 1948 Clarksdale, Mississippi, U.S.
- Died: June 11, 2020 (aged 72) Atlanta, Georgia, U.S.
- Listed height: 6 ft 3 in (1.91 m)
- Listed weight: 180 lb (82 kg)

Career information
- College: Coahoma CC (1966–1968); Stetson (1968–1970)
- NBA draft: 1970: 2nd round, 30th overall pick
- Drafted by: Los Angeles Lakers
- Position: Guard
- Number: 20

Career history
- 1970–1971: Los Angeles Lakers
- Stats at NBA.com
- Stats at Basketball Reference

Earnest Killum (June 11, 1948 – June 11, 2020) was an American professional basketball player for the Los Angeles Lakers of the National Basketball Association (NBA). After starring for Stetson from 1968 to 1970, averaging a school-record 24.9 points over two seasons and earning All-America honors, he was selected by the Lakers with the thirteenth pick (30th overall) in the second round of the 1970 NBA draft. An ankle injury limited him to only four games, in which he averaged 0.3 points and 0.5 rebounds.

Killum departed the league after the 1970–71 season, and played the next year in Europe before retiring. He is one of only two Stetson alumni to play in the NBA, along with Lorenzo Williams, and was elected into the school's athletic Hall of Fame in 1983.

He became a vice principal at Milton High School in Alpharetta, Georgia in the early 2000s.

== Career statistics ==
Legend
GP	Games played	GS	Games started	MPG	Minutes per game
FG%	Field goal percentage	3P%	3-point field goal percentage	FT%	Free throw percentage
RPG	Rebounds per game	APG	Assists per game	SPG	Steals per game
BPG	Blocks per game	PPG	Points per game	**Bold**	Career high

=== NBA ===
==== Regular season ====
Year	Team	GP	MPG	FG%	FT%	RPG	APG	PPG
1970–71	L.A. Lakers	4	3.0	.000	1.000	.5	.0	.3

==== Playoffs ====
Year	Team	GP	MPG	FG%	FT%	RPG	APG	PPG
1971	L.A. Lakers	2	2.0	1.000	.667	.0	.0	2.0
