= Earle Higgins =

American basketball player

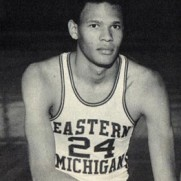
- Higgins at Eastern Michigan.

Personal information
- Born: December 30, 1946 (age 79)
- Listed height: 6 ft 8 in (2.03 m)
- Listed weight: 195 lb (88 kg)

Career information
- High school: Ann Arbor (Ann Arbor, Michigan)
- College: Casper College (1966–1967); Eastern Michigan (1967–1970)
- NBA draft: 1970: 3rd round, 36th overall pick
- Drafted by: San Francisco Warriors
- Position: Power forward
- Number: 23

Career history
- 1970–1971: Indiana Pacers
- Stats at Basketball Reference

Earle Brent Higgins (born December 30, 1946) is an American former professional basketball power forward who spent one season in the American Basketball Association as a member of the Indiana Pacers during the 1970–71 season. He played at Casper College in Wyoming and then moved on to Eastern Michigan University. He was drafted from Eastern Michigan University during the third round of the 1970 NBA draft by the San Francisco Warriors, but he did not play for them. He is the father of National Basketball Association (NBA) player Sean Higgins.
