= Joe DePre =

American basketball player

Personal information
- Born: December 19, 1947 (age 78) Westbury, New York, U.S.
- Listed height: 6 ft 3 in (1.91 m)
- Listed weight: 185 lb (84 kg)

Career information
- High school: Westbury (Westbury, New York)
- College: St. John's (1967–1970)
- NBA draft: 1970: 2nd round, 29th overall pick
- Drafted by: Phoenix Suns
- Playing career: 1970–1978
- Position: Shooting guard
- Number: 21

Career history
- 1970–1972: New York Nets
- 1972–1973: Wilkes-Barre Barons
- 1975–1976: Long Island Sounds
- 1977–1978: Long Island Ducks

Career highlights
- EBA champion (1973)
- Stats at Basketball Reference

Joe DePre (born December 19, 1947) is an American former professional basketball player. He played three seasons as a shooting guard in the American Basketball Association (ABA), all as a member of the New York Nets (1970–73). He was drafted in the second round (29^{th} overall) of the 1970 NBA draft from St. John's University by the Phoenix Suns, but he never played for them.

DePre played in the Eastern Basketball Association (EBA) for the Wilkes-Barre Barons, Long Island Sounds and Long Island Ducks from 1972 to 1978. He won an EBA championship with the Barons in 1973.
