= Bobby Croft =

Canadian basketball player (1946–2014)

Personal information
- Born: March 17, 1946 Hamilton, Ontario, Canada
- Died: March 23, 2014 (aged 68) Burlington, Ontario, Canada
- Listed height: 6 ft 10 in (2.08 m)
- Listed weight: 200 lb (91 kg)

Career information
- High school: Hill Park (Hamilton, Ontario)
- College: Tennessee (1967–1970)
- NBA draft: 1970: 8th round, 123rd overall pick
- Drafted by: Boston Celtics
- Playing career: 1970–71
- Position: Center
- Number: 25, 43

Career history
- 1970–1971: Kentucky Colonels
- 1971: Texas Chaparrals

Career highlights
- Second-team All-SEC (1970)
- Stats at Basketball Reference

Robert Alexander Croft (March 17, 1946 – March 23, 2014) was a Canadian professional basketball player. He played as a centre in the American Basketball Association (ABA) for the Texas Chaparrals and the Kentucky Colonels during the 1970–71 season. He attended Hill Park Secondary School in Hamilton, Ontario and later went on to study at the University of Tennessee before being drafted as the fourth pick in the eighth round by the Boston Celtics in the 1970 NBA draft. He died at a hospice in Burlington, Ontario in 2014, aged 68.
