= Claude Virden =

American basketball player

Personal information
- Born: November 25, 1947 (age 78) Akron, Ohio, U.S.
- Listed height: 6 ft 6 in (1.98 m)
- Listed weight: 195 lb (88 kg)

Career information
- High school: Central (Akron, Ohio)
- College: Paducah JC (1966–1967); Murray State (1967–1970)
- NBA draft: 1970: 9th round, 142nd overall pick
- Drafted by: Seattle SuperSonics
- Playing career: 1972–1973
- Position: Small forward
- Number: 24

Career history
- 1972–1973: Kentucky Colonels

Career highlights
- OVC Player of the Year (1970); 2× First-team All-OVC (1969, 1970)
- Stats at Basketball Reference

Claude Felton Virden (born November 25, 1947) is an American former basketball player from Akron, Ohio.

== Career ==
Virden played college basketball for Murray State University. Virden was drafted by the Seattle SuperSonics in the 1970 NBA draft and by the Kentucky Colonels in the 1970 American Basketball Association draft.

After a stint in the United States Army, Virden signed with the Kentucky Colonels. Virden played for part of the 1972–73 season for the Colonels, averaging 9.9 points per game as the team made it to the ABA Finals before losing the championship to the Indiana Pacers 4 games to 3. A knee injury ended Virden's season.
