= Dan Hester =

American basketball player

Personal information
- Born: November 8, 1948 Mount Vernon, Illinois, U.S.
- Died: July 30, 2023 (aged 74) Fountain Hills, Arizona, U.S.
- Listed height: 6 ft 8 in (2.03 m)
- Listed weight: 210 lb (95 kg)

Career information
- High school: Mount Vernon (Mount Vernon, Illinois)
- College: Murray State College (1966–1968); LSU (1968–1970)
- NBA draft: 1970: 2nd round, 31st overall pick
- Drafted by: Atlanta Hawks
- Position: Center
- Number: 14, 8

Career history
- 1970–1971: Denver Rockets
- 1971: Kentucky Colonels

Career highlights
- Third-team All-SEC (1970)
- Stats at Basketball Reference

Dan Wayne Hester (November 8, 1948 – July 30, 2023) was an American professional basketball center who played one season in the American Basketball Association (ABA) as a member of the Denver Rockets and the Kentucky Colonels during the 1970–71 season. He was drafted from Louisiana State University by the Atlanta Hawks during the second round of the 1970 NBA draft, but he never played for them.

Hester worked in business after his playing career and was employed by Novartis at the time of his retirement in 2014. He had two children with his wife, Jan. Hester died in his sleep on July 30, 2023.
