= Samuel Watts =

American basketball player

Personal information
- Born: March 14, 1948 (age 78) Gary, Indiana, U.S.
- Listed height: 6 ft 3 in (1.91 m)
- Listed weight: 185 lb (84 kg)

Career information
- High school: Friedrich Froebel (Gary, Indiana)
- College: Northwest CC; Florida A&M; Providence (Montana) (1968–1970)
- NBA draft: 1970: undrafted
- Position: Shooting guard
- Number: 32

Career history
- 1970–1971: Pittsburgh Condors
- Stats at Basketball Reference

Samuel Watts (born March 14, 1948) is an American former professional basketball player. He played in the American Basketball Association for the Pittsburgh Condors during the 1970–71 season. In his ABA career he scored 281 points. In September 1971, Watts attempted to play his way onto the NBA's Chicago Bulls final roster but was released on waivers during the preseason.

Prior to playing professionally, Watts played at Northwest Mississippi Community College, Florida A&M University, and the University of Great Falls ( now the University of Providence) (1968–70).
