= Sam Robinson (basketball) =

American basketball player (born 1948)

Personal information
- Born: January 1, 1948 (age 78) Los Angeles, California, U.S.
- Listed height: 6 ft 7 in (2.01 m)
- Listed weight: 190 lb (86 kg)

Career information
- High school: Jefferson (Los Angeles, California)
- College: Pasadena CC (1966–1968); Long Beach State (1968–1970)
- NBA draft: 1970: 6th round, 91st overall pick
- Drafted by: Seattle SuperSonics
- Playing career: 1970–1972
- Position: Small forward
- Number: 31

Career history
- 1970–1972: The Floridians
- 1970–1971: Wilkes-Barre Barons

Career highlights
- First-team Parade All-American (1966); Third-team Parade All-American (1965)
- Stats at Basketball Reference

Samuel Lee Robinson (born January 1, 1948) is an American former professional basketball player.

A 6'7" small forward, Robinson played college basketball at Pasadena City College and Long Beach State. In the 1969–70 season, he averaged 19.7 points and 10.3 rebounds for Long Beach State en route to their first appearance in the NCAA Tournament. Afterwards, he became the first basketball player from Long Beach State to be drafted by a professional team, joining The Floridians of the American Basketball Association. Robinson was also the first Long Beach State 49er to be drafted in the NBA; he was selected by the Seattle SuperSonics in 1970 on the sixth round, but never played for them or any other team in that league.

Robinson played two seasons in the ABA, averaging 11.1 points per game. He was an ABA All-Rookie Team selection in 1971.

Robinson played five games for the Wilkes-Barre Barons of the Eastern Basketball Association (EBA) during the 1970–71 season.
