= Howie Wright =

American basketball player

Personal information
- Born: February 22, 1947 (age 78); Louisville, Kentucky, U.S.
- Listed height: 6 ft 3 in (1.91 m)
- Listed weight: 185 lb (84 kg)

Career information
- College: Austin Peay (1967–1970)
- NBA draft: 1970: 2nd round, 34th overall pick
- Drafted by: New York Knicks
- Position: Shooting guard
- Number: 45, 3

Career history
- 1970–1972: Kentucky Colonels

Career highlights
- 3× First-team All-OVC (1968–1970); No. 30 retired by Austin Peay Governors
- Stats at Basketball Reference

Howard L. Wright (born February 22, 1947, in Louisville, Kentucky) is an American former professional basketball shooting guard who played two seasons in the American Basketball Association (ABA) as member of the Kentucky Colonels (1970–72). He attended Austin Peay State University where he was selected during the second round of the 1970 NBA draft, but never signed.
