= Bob Seemer =

American basketball player

Personal information
- Born: Cocoa, Florida, U.S.
- Listed height: 6 ft 7 in (2.01 m)
- Listed weight: 205 lb (93 kg)

Career information
- High school: Cocoa (Cocoa, Florida)
- College: Georgia Tech (1967–1970)
- NBA draft: 1970: 10th round, 169th overall pick
- Drafted by: Milwaukee Bucks
- Position: Forward
- Stats at Basketball Reference

Robert Seemer is an American former basketball player.

== Basketball career ==
Seemer played for Cocoa High School where he was named to the Florida "All-Star State First Team" in 1966. He was the captain of the Georgia Tech Yellow Jackets men's basketball team. In his freshman year, he set two records and led in six offensive categories, and averaged 20 points per game for the season.

Seemer was selected in the tenth round (169 overall) of the 1970 NBA draft by the Milwaukee Bucks.

Seemer graduated with a bachelor from Georgia Tech and a Master of Business Administration from Florida Institute of Technology in 1985, where he was the recipient of the Jerome P. Keuper Distinguished Alumni Award in 2023.
