= Bob Riley (basketball) =

American basketball player

Personal information
- Born: July 6, 1948 (age 78) Columbus, Ohio, U.S.
- Listed height: 6 ft 9 in (2.06 m)
- Listed weight: 235 lb (107 kg)

Career information
- College: Mount St. Mary's (1966–1970)
- NBA draft: 1970: 5th round, 82nd overall pick
- Drafted by: Atlanta Hawks
- Playing career: 1970–1981
- Position: Forward
- Number: 12

Career history
- 1970: Atlanta Hawks
- 1970–1971: Sunbury Mercuries
- 1971: Wilkes-Barre Barons
- 1971–1981: Caen
- Stats at NBA.com
- Stats at Basketball Reference

Robert J. Riley (born July 6, 1948) is an American former professional basketball player. He was selected in the 1970 NBA draft by the Atlanta Hawks with the 82nd overall pick, the same draft the Hawks selected future Hall of Fame player Pete Maravich with the third overall pick. Riley's NBA career lasted just seven games.

== Career statistics ==
Legend
GP	Games played	GS	Games started	MPG	Minutes per game
FG%	Field goal percentage	3P%	3-point field goal percentage	FT%	Free throw percentage
RPG	Rebounds per game	APG	Assists per game	SPG	Steals per game
BPG	Blocks per game	PPG	Points per game	**Bold**	Career high

=== NBA ===
==== Regular season ====
Year	Team	GP	MPG	FG%	FT%	RPG	APG	PPG
1970–71	Atlanta	7	5.6	.444	.556	1.7	.1	1.9
