= Jim Penix =

American basketball player

Personal information
- Listed height: 6 ft 4 in (1.93 m)
- Listed weight: 190 lb (86 kg)

Career information
- High school: Rossford (Rossford, Ohio)
- College: Owens CC (1966–1968); Bowling Green (1968–1970)
- NBA draft: 1970: 4th round, 59th overall pick
- Drafted by: Portland Trail Blazers
- Position: Small forward

Career highlights
- MAC Player of the Year (1970); First-team All-MAC (1970)
- Stats at Basketball Reference

Jim Penix is an American retired basketball player, known for his college career at Bowling Green State University, where in 1970 he was named the Mid-American Conference Player of the Year.

Penix came from Rossford, Ohio, where he attended 17 different schools as his father's job as a construction foreman required the family to move frequently. He starred at Rossford High School, leading the team to the 1966 Ohio class A state final. He averaged 23.9 points per game that season and was named first-team All-State. Following his high school career, he followed his high school coach, Cot Marquette to junior college Penta Tech (now Owens Community College), where in his two-year career he averaged 28.5 points per game.

He then transferred to Bowling Green to complete his four-year career for new coach Bob Conibear. Known as an outstanding outside shooter, Penix entered the Falcons' rotation immediately as a junior, averaging 9.5 points and 4 rebounds per game for the Falcons. In his senior season, he started slowly, breaking into the starting lineup eight games into the season. Once there, his scoring touch ranked him as one of the top players in the Mid-American Conference (MAC). He averaged 19.5 points per game overall, but 22.9 in conference games to lead the MAC. He was named first-team All-MAC and the MAC Player of the Year at the close of the season.

Following his college career, Penix was selected by the Portland Trail Blazers in the 1970 NBA draft and the Denver Rockets of the American Basketball Association (ABA). He signed with the Rockets but was one of their last cuts prior to the 1970–71 season. He did not play professional basketball but continued to play in local amateur leagues. He was selected into the Owens Community College inaugural athletics hall of fame class in 2016.
