= Larry Mikan =

American basketball player (born 1948)

Personal information
- Born: April 8, 1948 (age 78) St. Paul, Minnesota, U.S.
- Listed height: 6 ft 7 in (2.01 m)
- Listed weight: 210 lb (95 kg)

Career information
- High school: Benilde (St. Louis Park, Minnesota)
- College: Minnesota (1967–1970)
- NBA draft: 1970: 4th round, 64th overall pick
- Drafted by: Los Angeles Lakers
- Playing career: 1970–1971
- Position: Power forward
- Number: 30

Career history
- 1970–1971: Cleveland Cavaliers
- Stats at NBA.com
- Stats at Basketball Reference

George Lawrence Mikan III (born April 8, 1948) is an American former basketball player. He played college basketball for the University of Minnesota and later professionally for the Cleveland Cavaliers in the National Basketball Association.

== Early life ==
The son of Hall of Famer George Mikan and nephew of Ed Mikan, Larry Mikan prepped at Benilde High School (now Benilde-St. Margaret's) where he played center.

== College career ==
In college, Mikan played three seasons for the University of Minnesota from 1967 to 1970s. During his senior year, he set a school record with 349 rebounds and he finished his college career with 1,007 points and 735 rebounds for an average of 14.0 points and 10.2 rebounds.

== Professional career ==
After graduating, he was drafted by the Los Angeles Lakers in the fourth round of the 1970 NBA draft but was waived in October the same year. He immediately gained interest from the Cleveland Cavaliers, now headed by his old college coach Bill Fitch. He signed with the Cavaliers on November 6 and went on to appear in 53 games, where he averaged 3.0 points and 2.6 rebounds. He was waived by the Cavaliers in October 1971.

== Career statistics ==
Legend
GP	Games played	GS	Games started	MPG	Minutes per game
FG%	Field goal percentage	3P%	3-point field goal percentage	FT%	Free throw percentage
RPG	Rebounds per game	APG	Assists per game	SPG	Steals per game
BPG	Blocks per game	PPG	Points per game	**Bold**	Career high

=== NBA ===
==== Regular season ====
Year	Team	GP	MPG	FG%	FT%	RPG	APG	PPG
1970–71	Cleveland	53	10.1	.333	.618	2.6	.8	3.0

== See also ==
- List of second-generation National Basketball Association players
