= Chuck Lloyd =

American basketball player

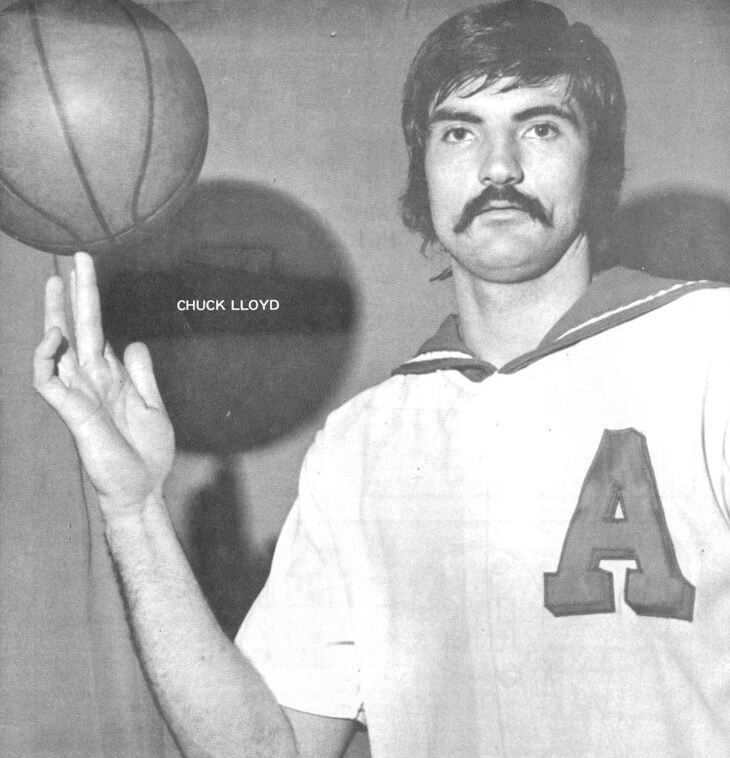
- Lloyd with the Allentown Jets in 1972

Personal information
- Born: May 22, 1947 (age 79)
- Listed height: 6 ft 8 in (2.03 m)
- Listed weight: 220 lb (100 kg)

Career information
- High school: Arlington (Arlington Heights, Illinois)
- College: Yankton (1967–1970)
- NBA draft: 1970: 10th round, 159th overall pick
- Drafted by: Seattle SuperSonics
- Playing career: 1970–1973
- Position: Power forward / center
- Number: 22

Career history
- 1970–1972: Scranton Apollos
- 1971: Carolina Cougars
- 1972–1973: Allentown Jets

Career highlights
- EBA champion (1971); All-EBA Second Team (1972)
- Stats at Basketball Reference

Charles P. Lloyd Jr. (born May 22, 1947) is a retired professional basketball player who spent one season in the American Basketball Association (ABA) as a member of the Carolina Cougars during the 1970–71 season.

== Biography ==
He attended Yankton College where he was drafted in the tenth round of the 1970 NBA draft (159^{th} pick overall) by the Seattle SuperSonics, but never signed.

== Playing career ==
During his career, weighed 220 lbs., and stood 6'8".

Lloyd played in the Eastern Basketball Association (EBA) for the Scranton Apollos and Allentown Jets from 1970 to 1973. He won an EBA championship with the Apollos in 1971. Lloyd was selected to the All-EBA Second Team in 1972.
