= Bill Zopf =

American basketball player

Personal information
- Born: June 7, 1948 (age 78) Monaca, Pennsylvania, U.S.
- Listed height: 6 ft 1 in (1.85 m)
- Listed weight: 170 lb (77 kg)

Career information
- High school: Monaca (Monaca, Pennsylvania)
- College: Duquesne (1967–1970)
- NBA draft: 1970: 2nd round, 33rd overall pick
- Drafted by: Milwaukee Bucks
- Playing career: 1970–1971
- Position: Point guard
- Number: 6

Career history
- 1970–1971: Milwaukee Bucks

Career highlights
- NBA champion (1971)
- Stats at NBA.com
- Stats at Basketball Reference

William Charles Zopf Jr. (born June 7, 1948) is an American former professional basketball player. He was a point guard and played collegiately at Duquesne University. He played for the Milwaukee Bucks during his brief National Basketball Association (NBA) career.

== High school career ==
Zopf attended Monaca High School. As a senior, he scored 391 points while leading his team to a 21–1 record.

== College career ==
Zopf played four seasons at Duquesne University, scoring 999 points on 888 attempts and averaging 13.3 points per game. He was named the Steel Bowl tournament MVP and as a senior was named to the Academic All-America Team.

== Professional career ==
Zopf was selected with the 16th pick, in the second round of the 1970 NBA draft by the Milwaukee Bucks. He played 53 games for the Bucks in 1970–71, averaging 2.2 points, 0.9 rebounds, and 1.4 assists per game, shooting 36.3% from the field and 55.6% from the free throw line. He left the Bucks in February 1971 due to a call-up to the army reserve unit. After returning for the fall of 1971, the Bucks waived Zopf on October 2, 1971.

== Personal life ==
After retiring from the NBA, Zopf worked as a business equipment lease broker. Zopf coached his daughter Annie's AAU basketball team. She went on to play collegiately at Fordham University. Bill Zopf was named to the Beaver County (Pennsylvania) Sports Hall of Fame in 1988.

== Career statistics ==
Legend
| GP | Games played | GS | Games started | MPG | Minutes per game |
| FG% | Field goal percentage | 3P% | 3-point field goal percentage | FT% | Free throw percentage |
| RPG | Rebounds per game | APG | Assists per game | SPG | Steals per game |
| BPG | Blocks per game | PPG | Points per game | **Bold** | Career high |

=== NBA ===
==== Regular season ====
| Year | Team | GP | MPG | FG% | FT% | RPG | APG | PPG |
|---|---|---|---|---|---|---|---|---|
| 1970–71 | Milwaukee | 53 | 7.5 | .363 | .556 | .9 | 1.4 | 2.2 |
