= Jim Wilson (basketball) =

American basketball player

Personal information
- Born: 1948 (age 77–78)
- Listed height: 5 ft 10 in (1.78 m)
- Listed weight: 175 lb (79 kg)

Career information
- College: Cheyney (1968–1970)
- NBA draft: 1970: 4th round, 62nd overall pick
- Drafted by: Chicago Bulls
- Playing career: 1970–1973
- Position: Point guard
- Number: 14

Career history
- 1970: Pittsburgh Condors
- 1971–1972: Cherry Hill Demons / Hazleton Hurricanes / Bits
- 1972–1973: Allentown Jets

Career highlights
- First-team All-PSAC East Division (1970); PSAC East Division MVP (1970); UPI Small College All-American (1970)
- Stats at Basketball Reference

James Wilson (born 1948) is an American former professional basketball player. He played in the American Basketball Association in six games for the Pittsburgh Condors during the 1970–71 season.

Wilson played in the Eastern Basketball Association (EBA) for the Cherry Hill Demons / Hazleton Hurricanes / Bits and Allentown Jets from 1971 to 1973.
