= Lonnie Kluttz =

American basketball player (1945–2019)

Personal information
- Born: September 17, 1945
- Died: February 16, 2019 (aged 73)
- Listed height: 6 ft 7 in (2.01 m)
- Listed weight: 220 lb (100 kg)

Career information
- High school: Dunbar (East Spencer, North Carolina)
- College: North Carolina A&T (1968–1970)
- NBA draft: 1970: 6th round, 96th overall pick
- Drafted by: Chicago Bulls
- Position: Forward
- Number: 13

Career history
- 1970: Carolina Cougars
- Stats at Basketball Reference

Lonnie Gene Kluttz (September 17, 1945 – February 16, 2019) was an American professional basketball player. He played in three games for the American Basketball Association's Carolina Cougars during the 1970–71 season.
