= Walker Banks =

American basketball player (born 1947)

Personal information
- Born: August 26, 1947 (age 79)
- Listed height: 6 ft 10 in (2.08 m)
- Listed weight: 205 lb (93 kg)

Career information
- High school: Clifton Forge (Clifton Forge, Virginia)
- College: Western Kentucky (1967–1970)
- NBA draft: 1970: 9th round, 153rd overall pick
- Drafted by: New York Knicks
- Playing career: 1970–1976
- Position: Center
- Number: 22

Career history
- 1970–1971: Pittsburgh Condors
- 1970–1973: Wilkes-Barre Barons
- 1974–1975: Scranton Apollos
- 1975–1976: Wilkes-Barre Barons

Career highlights
- All-EBA Second Team (1973)
- Stats at Basketball Reference

Walker Burrell Banks Jr. (born August 26, 1947) is an American former basketball player who played one season in the American Basketball Association (ABA).

He played collegiality for the Western Kentucky University.

He was selected by the New York Knicks in the ninth round (153rd pick overall) of the 1970 NBA draft.

He played for the Pittsburgh Condors (1970–71) in the ABA for 16 games.

Banks played in the Eastern Basketball Association (EBA) for the Wilkes-Barre Barons and Scranton Apollos from 1970 to 1976. He was selected to the All-EBA Second Team in 1973.
