= Vann Williford =

American basketball player (born 1948)

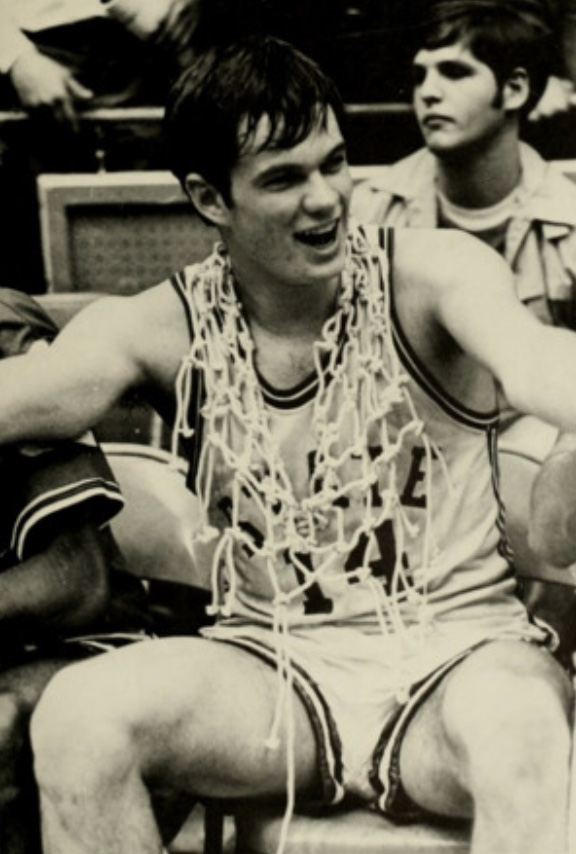
- Williford after winning 1970 ACC Tournament MVP honors

Personal information
- Born: January 26, 1948 (age 78) Fayetteville, North Carolina, U.S.
- Listed height: 6 ft 6 in (1.98 m)
- Listed weight: 195 lb (88 kg)

Career information
- High school: Fayetteville (Fayetteville, North Carolina)
- College: NC State (1967–1970)
- NBA draft: 1970: 3rd round, 48th overall pick
- Drafted by: Phoenix Suns
- Position: Small forward
- Number: 14

Career history
- 1970–1971: Carolina Cougars

Career highlights
- 2× First-team All-ACC (1969, 1970); ACC tournament MVP (1970); No. 14 jersey honored by NC State Wolfpack
- Stats at Basketball Reference

Duncan Vann Williford (born January 26, 1948) is an American former professional basketball player. He played one season for the American Basketball Association's Carolina Cougars during the 1970–71 ABA season. He is a native of Fayetteville, North Carolina, and owns a North Carolina–based material handling equipment company, Atlantic Coast Toyotalift.
