= 1970 NBA draft =

Basketball player selection

General information
- Sport: Basketball
- Date: March 23, 1970
- Location: New York City, New York

Overview
- 239 total selections in 19 rounds
- League: NBA
- First selection: Bob Lanier, Detroit Pistons
- Hall of Famers: 8: C Bob Lanier; F Rudy Tomjanovich; G Pete Maravich; F Dave Cowens; G Calvin Murphy; G Nate Archibald; G Charlie Scott; F Dan Issel

The 1970 NBA draft was the 24th annual draft of the National Basketball Association (NBA). The draft was held on March 23, 1970, before the 1970–71 season. In this draft, 17 NBA teams took turns selecting amateur U.S. college basketball players and other eligible players, including international players. A player who had finished his four-year college eligibility was eligible for selection. If a player left college early, he would not be eligible for selection until his college class graduated. The first two picks in the draft belonged to the teams that finished last in each division, with the order determined by a coin flip. The Detroit Pistons won the coin flip and were awarded the first overall pick, while the San Diego Rockets were awarded the second pick. The remaining first-round picks and the subsequent rounds were assigned to teams in reverse order of their win–loss record in the previous season. Three expansion franchises, the Buffalo Braves, the Cleveland Cavaliers and the Portland Trail Blazers, took part in the NBA Draft for the first time and were assigned the seventh, the eighth and the ninth pick in each round. In the first round, the Cavaliers had the seventh pick, while the Blazers and the Braves had the eighth and the ninth pick respectively. In the subsequent rounds, the Cavaliers and the Braves exchanged their order of selection, while the Blazers had the eighth pick throughout the draft. The draft consisted of 19 rounds comprising the selection of 239 players; it holds the record for the most prospects selected in any NBA draft.

== Draft selections and draftee career notes ==
Bob Lanier from St. Bonaventure University was selected first overall by the Detroit Pistons. Rudy Tomjanovich from the University of Michigan and Pete Maravich from Louisiana State University were selected second and third, respectively. Fourth pick Dave Cowens from Florida State University and eighth pick Geoff Petrie from Princeton University were joint winners of the Rookie of the Year Award in their first season. Six players from this draft, Lanier, Maravich, Cowens, 18th pick Calvin Murphy, 19th pick Nate Archibald, and 122nd pick Dan Issel, have been inducted to the Basketball Hall of Fame. Maravich, Cowens, and Archibald were also named to the list of the 50 Greatest Players in NBA History at the league's 50th anniversary in 1996. Maravich had four All-NBA Team selections and five All-Star Game selections. Cowens won two NBA championships with the Boston Celtics in 1974 and 1976, one Most Valuable Player Award in 1973, and had three All-NBA Team selections and seven All-Star Game selections. Archibald won one NBA championship with the Celtics in 1981 and had five All-NBA Team selections and six All-Star Game selections. Lanier and Murphy were selected to eight and one All-Star Games, respectively. Issel initially opted to play in the American Basketball Association (ABA) with the Kentucky Colonels. He played six seasons in the ABA before finally joining the NBA with the Denver Nuggets when both leagues merged. He was selected to five All-ABA Teams, six ABA All-Star Games, and one NBA All-Star Game.

Randy Smith, who was selected by the Detroit Pistons with the 205th pick, did not enter the league until the 1971–72 season, after he was drafted again in the 1971 NBA draft by the Buffalo Braves with the 104th pick. He was selected to both the All-NBA Team and the All-Star Game. Tomjanovich was selected to five All-Star Games during his career. Charlie Scott, the 106th pick, initially played in the ABA with the Virginia Squires before joining the NBA in 1972. He was selected to two All-ABA Teams, two ABA All-Star Games, and three NBA All-Star Games. Three other players from this draft, fifth pick Sam Lacey, seventh pick John Johnson, and eighth pick Geoff Petrie, were also selected to at least one All-Star Game. The Rockets' first and second-round picks, Tomjanovich and Murphy spent all of their playing career with the Rockets. Tomjanovich played 11 seasons while Murphy played 13 seasons with the Rockets.

Lanier, Tomjanovich, Cowens, and Issel all became head coaches after ending their playing career. Lanier was the interim head coach of the Golden State Warriors in the 1995. Tomjanovich coached two NBA teams, the Houston Rockets and the Los Angeles Lakers. He coached the Rockets for 12 seasons, leading them to the NBA championship twice in 1994 and 1995. He also coached the United States national basketball team to a gold medal at the 2000 Olympic Games. Cowens started his coaching career as a player-coach with the Celtics during the 1978–79 season, before returning to a full-time player in the next season. He later coached two more NBA teams, most recently with the Golden State Warriors. Issel coached the Denver Nuggets for six seasons in two separate three-year stints. Two other players drafted also went on to have coaching careers in the NBA: 40th pick Gar Heard and 125th pick George Irvine.

The 1970 draft class is considered to be one of the best in NBA history as it produced eight Hall of Famers and 12 All-Stars from those who played in the NBA. The first four picks were inducted to the Hall of Fame and seven of the first eight picks became All-Stars. The 1970 Draft also was the first draft where international players who had never played U.S. high school and college basketball were selected. In the 10th and 11th round, the Atlanta Hawks drafted Mexican Manuel Raga and Italian Dino Meneghin; both were playing in the Italian league at the time. They became the first two international players drafted to the NBA. However, neither played in the league as the Hawks did not have US$35,000 to buy out either of their contracts with their teams. Meneghin, who played 28 seasons in Italy, has been inducted by the International Basketball Federation (FIBA) to the FIBA Hall of Fame and also to the Basketball Hall of Fame. Raga has also been inducted into the FIBA Hall of Fame.

== Key ==
Pos.	G	F	C
Position	Guard	Forward	Center

^	Denotes player who has been inducted to the Naismith Memorial Basketball Hall of Fame
*	Denotes player who has been selected for at least one All-Star Game and All-NBA Team
^{+}	Denotes player who has been selected for at least one All-Star Game
^{#}	Denotes player who has never appeared in an NBA regular-season or playoff game
^{~}	Denotes player who has been selected as Rookie of the Year

== Draft ==
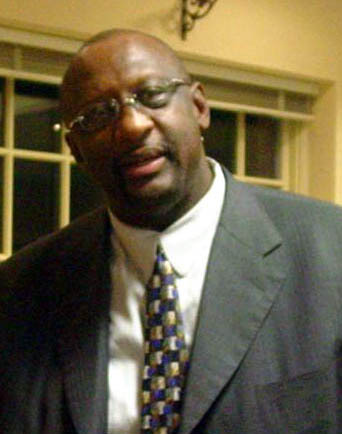
Bob Lanier was selected first overall by the Detroit Pistons.

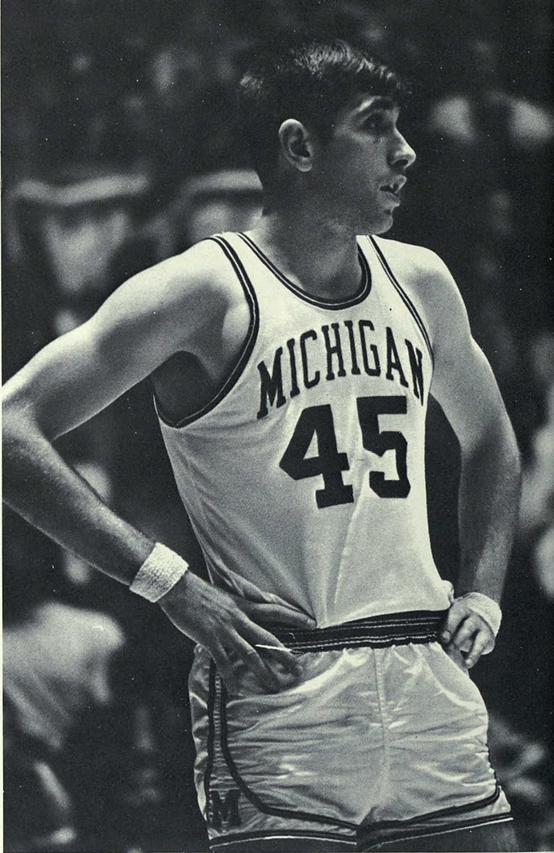
Rudy Tomjanovich was selected second overall by the San Diego Rockets.

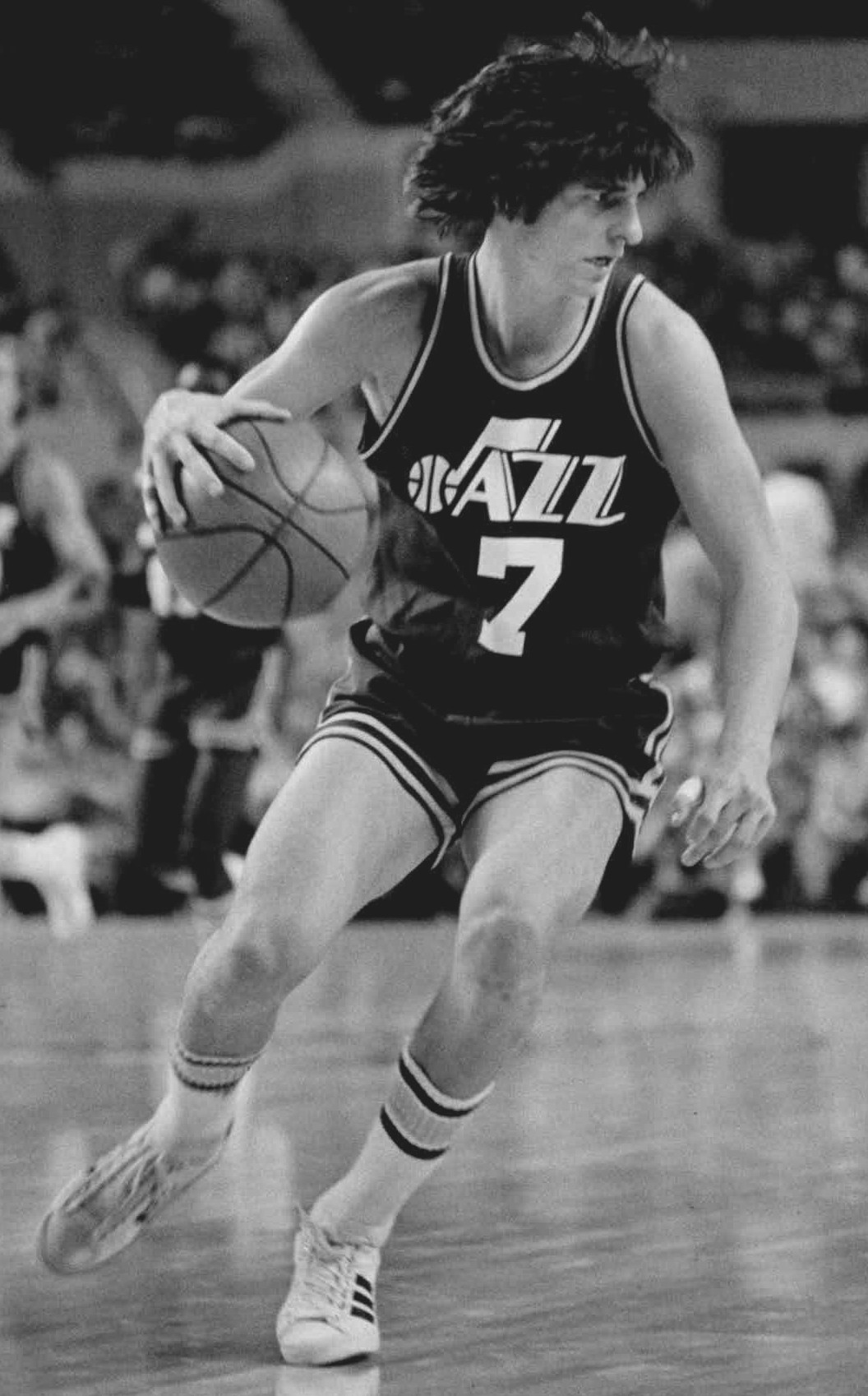
Pete Maravich was selected third overall by the Atlanta Hawks.

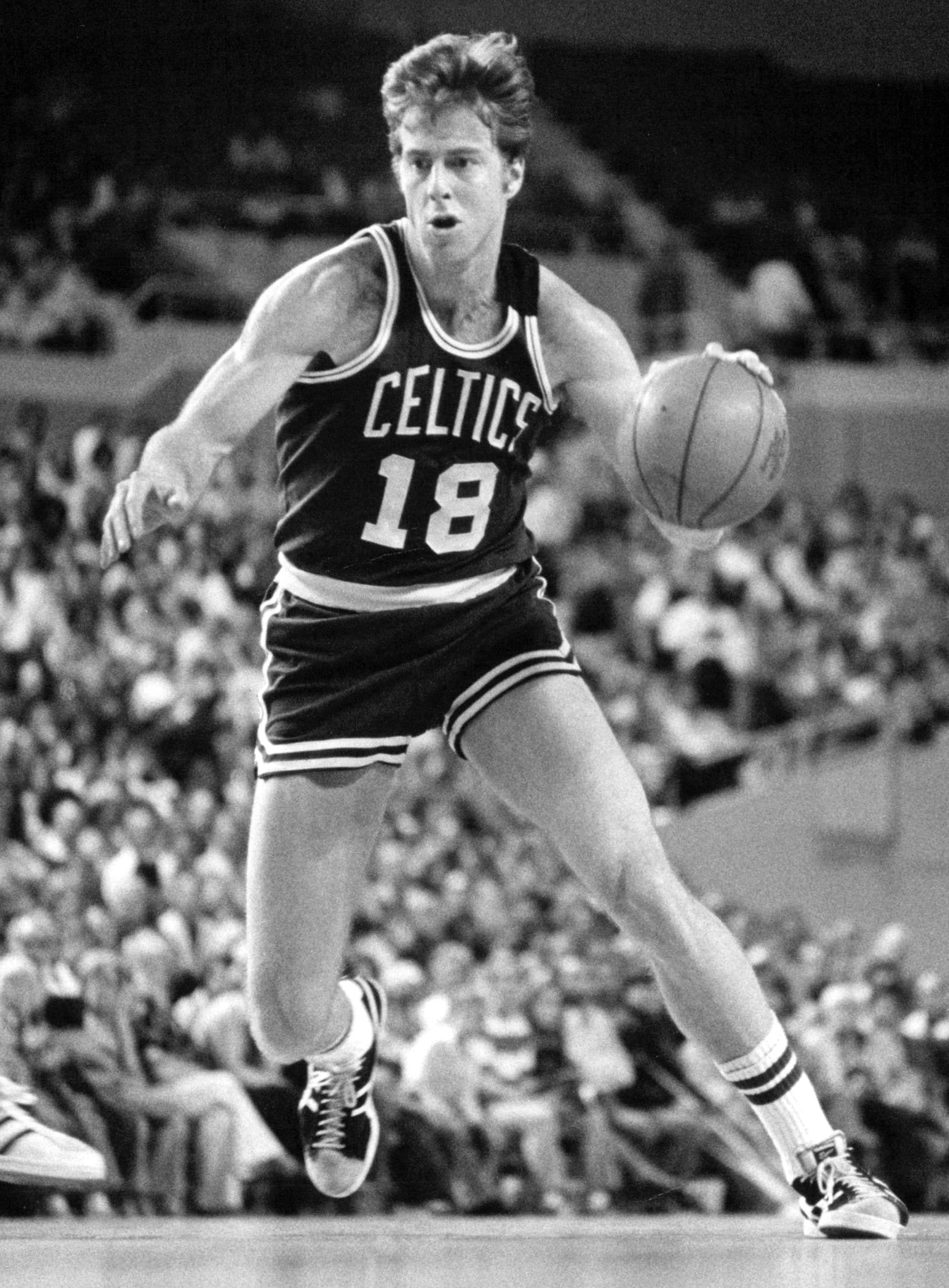
Dave Cowens was selected fourth overall by the Boston Celtics.

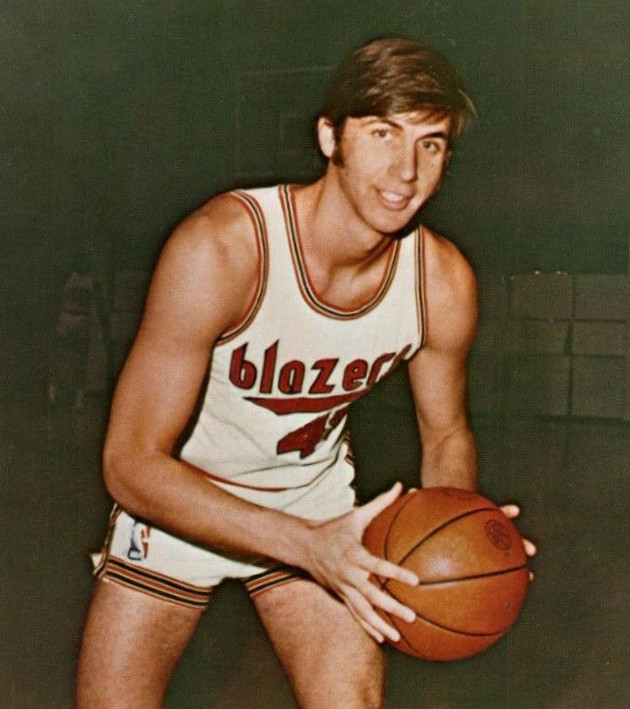
Geoff Petrie was selected eighth overall by the Portland Trail Blazers.

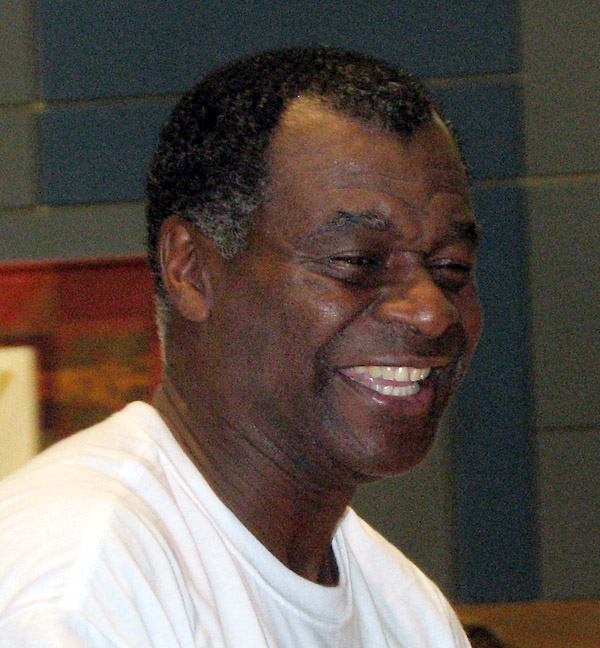
Calvin Murphy was selected 18th overall by the San Diego Rockets.

Rnd.	Pick	Player	Pos.	Nationality (Note: Nationality indicates the player's national team or representative nationality. If a player has not competed at the international level, then the nationality indicates the national team which the player is eligible to represent according to FIBA rules.)	Team	School / club team
1	1	Bob Lanier^	C	United States	Detroit Pistons	St. Bonaventure (Sr.)
1	2	Rudy Tomjanovich^	F	United States	San Diego Rockets	Michigan (Sr.)
1	3	Pete Maravich^	G	United States	Atlanta Hawks (from San Francisco)^{[a]}	Louisiana State (Sr.)
1	4	Dave Cowens^^{~}	F/C	United States	Boston Celtics	Florida State (Sr.)
1	5	Sam Lacey^{+}	C	United States	Cincinnati Royals	New Mexico State (Sr.)
1	6	Jim Ard	F/C	United States	Seattle SuperSonics	Cincinnati (Sr.)
1	7	John Johnson^{+}	F	United States	Cleveland Cavaliers	Iowa (Sr.)
1	8	Geoff Petrie^{+}^{~}	G	United States	Portland Trail Blazers	Princeton (Sr.)
1	9	George E. Johnson	C	United States	Baltimore Bullets (from Buffalo)^{[b]}	Stephen F. Austin (Sr.)
1	10	Greg Howard	F/C	United States	Phoenix Suns	Brill Cagliari (Italy)
1	11	Jimmy Collins	G	United States	Chicago Bulls	New Mexico State (Sr.)
1	12	Al Henry	C	United States	Philadelphia 76ers	Wisconsin (Sr.)
1	13	Jim McMillian	F	United States	Los Angeles Lakers	Columbia (Sr.)
1	14	John Vallely	G	United States	Atlanta Hawks	UCLA (Sr.)
1	15	John Hummer	F/C	United States	Buffalo Braves (from Baltimore)^{[b]}	Princeton (Sr.)
1	16	Gary Freeman	F	United States	Milwaukee Bucks	Oregon State (Sr.)
1	17	Mike Price	G	United States	New York Knicks	Illinois (Sr.)
2	18	Calvin Murphy^	G	United States	San Diego Rockets	Niagara (Sr.)
2	19	Nate Archibald^	G	United States	Cincinnati Royals (from San Francisco)^{[c]}	Texas-El Paso (Sr.)
2	20	Jake Ford	G	United States	Seattle SuperSonics (from Detroit)^{[d]}	Maryland State (Sr.)
2	21	Rex Morgan	G	United States	Boston Celtics	Jacksonville (Sr.)
2	22	Doug Cook^{#}	F	United States	Cincinnati Royals	Davidson (Sr.)
2	23	Pete Cross	F/C	United States	Seattle SuperSonics	San Francisco (Sr.)
2	24	Cornell Warner	F/C	United States	Buffalo Braves	Jackson State (Sr.)
2	25	Walt Gilmore	F	United States	Portland Trail Blazers	Fort Valley State (Sr.)
2	26	Dave Sorenson	F	United States	Cleveland Cavaliers	Ohio State (Sr.)
2	27	Fred Taylor	G/F	United States	Phoenix Suns	Pan American (Sr.)
2	28	Paul Ruffner	F/C	United States	Chicago Bulls	Brigham Young (Sr.)
2	29	Joe DePre^{#}	G	United States	Phoenix Suns (from Philadelphia)^{[e]}	St. John's (Sr.)
2	30	Earnie Killum	G	United States	Los Angeles Lakers	Stetson (Sr.)
2	31	Dan Hester^{#}	F	United States	Atlanta Hawks	Louisiana State (Sr.)
2	32	Ken Warzynski^{#}	F	United States	Detroit Pistons (from Baltimore)^{[f]}	DePaul (Sr.)
2	33	Bill Zopf	G	United States	Milwaukee Bucks	Duquesne (Sr.)
2	34	Howie Wright^{#}	G	United States	New York Knicks	Austin Peay (Sr.)
3	35	Curtis Perry	F	United States	San Diego Rockets	Southwest Missouri (Sr.)
3	36	Earle Higgins^{#}	F	United States	San Francisco Warriors	Eastern Michigan (Sr.)
3	37	Bob St. Pierre^{#}	C	United States	Detroit Pistons	Hanover (Sr.)
3	38	Willie Williams	F	United States	Boston Celtics	Florida State (Sr.)
3	39	Greg Hyder	F	United States	Cincinnati Royals	Eastern New Mexico (Sr.)
3	40	Gar Heard	F	United States	Seattle SuperSonics	Oklahoma (Sr.)
3	41	Surry Oliver^{#}	F	United States	Cleveland Cavaliers	Stephen F. Austin (Sr.)
3	42	Bill Cain^{#}	F	United States	Portland Trail Blazers	Iowa State (Sr.)
3	43	Chip Case^{#}	G	United States	Baltimore Bullets	Virginia (Sr.)
3	44	Greg McDivitt^{#}	F	United States	Phoenix Suns	Ohio (Sr.)
3	45	Lou Herndon^{#}	G	United States	Chicago Bulls	Jackson State (Sr.)
3	46	Dennis Awtrey	C	United States	Philadelphia 76ers	Santa Clara (Sr.)
3	47	Jim Hayes^{#}	G	United States	Detroit Pistons	Boston University (Sr.)
3	48	Vann Williford^{#}	F	United States	Phoenix Suns	NC State (Sr.)
3	49	Seabern Hill^{#}	G	United States	Baltimore Bullets	Arizona State (Sr.)
3	50	Marv Winkler	G	United States	Milwaukee Bucks	Southwestern Louisiana (Sr.)
3	51	Al Williams^{#}	F	United States	New York Knicks	Drake (Sr.)
4	52	Jody Finney^{#}	G	United States	San Diego Rockets	Ohio State (Sr.)
4	53	Ralph Ogden	F	United States	San Francisco Warriors	Santa Clara (Sr.)
4	54	Bill Stricker	F	United States	Baltimore Bullets (from Detroit)^{[f]}	Pacific (Sr.)
4	55	Jon McKinney^{#}	F	United States	Boston Celtics	Norfolk State (Sr.)
4	56	Wade Fuller^{#}	G	United States	Cincinnati Royals	Loyola Chicago (Sr.)
4	57	John Davis^{#}	F	United States	Chicago Bulls	Alabama State (Sr.)
4	58	Erwin Polnick^{#}	F	United States	Buffalo Braves	Stephen F. Austin (Sr.)
4	59	Jim Penix^{#}	G	United States	Portland Trail Blazers	Bowling Green (Sr.)
4	60	Glenn Vidnovic^{#}	G	United States	Cleveland Cavaliers	Iowa (Sr.)
4	61	Bob Lienhard^{#}	C	United States	Phoenix Suns	Georgia (Sr.)
4	62	Jim Wilson^{#}	G	United States	Chicago Bulls	Cheyney State (Sr.)
4	63	Dan Crenshaw^{#}	F	United States	Philadelphia 76ers	Alabama State (Sr.)
4	64	Larry Mikan	F	United States	Los Angeles Lakers	Minnesota (Sr.)
4	65	Fred Davis^{#}	F	United States	Atlanta Hawks	Howard Payne (Sr.)
4	66	Billy Jones^{#}	C	United States	Baltimore Bullets	Louisiana College (Sr.)
4	67	Virgle Fredrick^{#}	G	United States	Milwaukee Bucks	Drury (Sr.)
4	68	John Marren^{#}	F	United States	New York Knicks	Manhattan (Sr.)
5	69	James Gilbert^{#}	C	United States	San Diego Rockets	Adams State (Sr.)
5	70	Levi Fontaine	G	United States	San Francisco Warriors	Maryland State (Sr.)
5	71	Bill Jankans^{#}	F	United States	Detroit Pistons	Cal State Long Beach (Sr.)
5	72	Tom Carter^{#}	F	United States	Boston Celtics	Paul Quinn (Sr.)
5	73	Uluss Thompson^{#}	F	United States	Cincinnati Royals	Wiley (Sr.)
5	74	Boyd Lynch^{#}	F	United States	Seattle SuperSonics	Eastern Kentucky (Sr.)
5	75	Wayne Sokolowski^{#}	F	United States	Cleveland Cavaliers	Ashland (Sr.)
5	76	Ron Knight	F	United States	Portland Trail Blazers	Cal State-Los Angeles (Sr.)
5	77	Robert Moore^{#}	G	United States	Buffalo Braves	Central State (Sr.)
5	78	John Canine^{#}	G	United States	Phoenix Suns	Ohio (Sr.)
5	79	George T. Johnson	F/C	United States	Chicago Bulls	Dillard (Sr.)
5	80	Perry Wallace^{#}	F	United States	Philadelphia 76ers	Vanderbilt (Sr.)
5	81	John Fultz^{#}	F	United States	Los Angeles Lakers	Rhode Island (Sr.)
5	82	Bob Riley	F	United States	Atlanta Hawks	Mount St. Mary's (Sr.)
5	83	Gary Zeller	G	United States	Baltimore Bullets	Drake (Sr.)
5	84	Mike Grosso^{#}	C	United States	Milwaukee Bucks	Louisville (Sr.)
5	85	Jim Oxley^{#}	G	United States	New York Knicks	Army (Sr.)
6	86	Mike Kretzer^{#}	F	United States	San Diego Rockets	East Tennessee State (Sr.)
6	87	Vic Bartolome	C	United States	San Francisco Warriors	Oregon State (Sr.)
6	88	Sevira Brown^{#}	F	United States	Detroit Pistons	DePaul (Sr.)
6	89	Rod McIntyre^{#}	F	United States	Boston Celtics	Jacksonville (Sr.)
6	90	Charles Bishop^{#}	C	United States	Cincinnati Royals	Louisiana Tech (Sr.)
6	91	Sam Robinson^{#}	F	United States	Seattle SuperSonics	Cal State Long Beach (Sr.)
6	92	Doug Hess^{#}	C	United States	Buffalo Braves	Toledo (Jr.)
6	93	George Janky^{#}	F	United States	Portland Trail Blazers	Dayton (Sr.)
6	94	Joe Cooke	G	United States	Cleveland Cavaliers	Indiana (Sr.)
6	95	Joe Thomas	F	United States	Phoenix Suns	Marquette (Sr.)
6	96	Lonnie Kluttz^{#}	F	United States	Chicago Bulls	North Carolina A&T (Sr.)
6	97	Jerry Venable^{#}	F	United States	Philadelphia 76ers	Kansas State (Sr.)
6	98	Jerry Kroll^{#}	G	United States	Los Angeles Lakers	Davidson (Sr.)
6	99	Dave Parker^{#}	F	United States	Atlanta Hawks	Windham (Sr.)
6	100	Marvin Polnick^{#}	F	United States	Baltimore Bullets	Stephen F. Austin (Sr.)
6	101	Willie Watson^{#}	F	United States	Milwaukee Bucks	Oklahoma City (Sr.)
6	102	Jim Signorile^{#}	F	United States	New York Knicks	NYU (Sr.)
7	103	Billy Paultz	F/C	United States	San Diego Rockets	St. John's (Sr.)
7	104	Joe Bergman^{#}	F	United States	San Francisco Warriors	Creighton (Sr.)
7	105	Marv Copeland^{#}	F	United States	Detroit Pistons	Shaw College (Sr.)
7	106	Charlie Scott^	G/F	United States	Boston Celtics	North Carolina (Sr.)
7	107	Michael Bernard^{#}	F	United States	Cincinnati Royals	Kentucky State (Sr.)
7	108	James Morgan^{#}	F	United States	Seattle SuperSonics	Maryland Eastern Shore (Sr.)
7	109	Narvis Anderson^{#}	F	United States	Cleveland Cavaliers	Stephen F. Austin (Sr.)
7	110	Claude English	F	United States	Portland Trail Blazers	Rhode Island (Sr.)
7	111	Cliff Shegogg^{#}	F	United States	Buffalo Braves	Colorado State (Sr.)
7	112	Heyward Dotson^{#}	G	United States	Phoenix Suns	Columbia (Sr.)
7	113	Lou West^{#}	G	United States	Chicago Bulls	Seattle (Sr.)
7	114	Carlton Poole^{#}	F	United States	Philadelphia 76ers	Philadelphia (Sr.)
7	115	Willie Woods^{#}	G	United States	Los Angeles Lakers	Eastern Kentucky (Sr.)
7	116	John Shinall^{#}	G	United States	Atlanta Hawks	Jackson State (Sr.)
7	117	Charlie Wallace^{#}	F	United States	Baltimore Bullets	Oklahoma City (Sr.)
7	118	John Rinka^{#}	G	United States	Milwaukee Bucks	Kenyon (Sr.)
7	119	Ray Hodge^{#}	G	United States	New York Knicks	Wagner (Sr.)
8	120	Don Adams	F	United States	San Diego Rockets	Northwestern (Sr.)
8	121	Jeff Sewell^{#}	G	United States	San Francisco Warriors	Marquette (Sr.)
8	122	Dan Issel^	F/C	United States	Detroit Pistons	Kentucky (Sr.)
8	123	Bobby Croft^{#}	C	Canada	Boston Celtics	Tennessee (Sr.)
8	124	Joe McBride^{#}	F	United States	Cincinnati Royals	Augusta State (Sr.)
8	125	George Irvine^{#}	F	United States	Seattle SuperSonics	Washington (Sr.)
8	126	Larry Woods^{#}	F	United States	Buffalo Braves	West Virginia (Sr.)
8	127	Doug Boyd^{#}	F	United States	Portland Trail Blazers	TCU (Sr.)
8	128	Walter Robertson^{#}	G	United States	Cleveland Cavaliers	Loyola Chicago (Sr.)
8	129	Steve Patterson	C	United States	Phoenix Suns	UCLA (Sr.)
8	130	Mike Casey^{#}	G	United States	Chicago Bulls	Kentucky (Jr.)
8	131	Fran O'Hanlan^{#}	G	United States	Philadelphia 76ers	Villanova (Sr.)
8	132	Rick Mount^{#}	G	United States	Los Angeles Lakers	Purdue (Sr.)
8	133	Herb White	G	United States	Atlanta Hawks	Georgia (Sr.)
8	134	Tom Dykstra^{#}	G	United States	Baltimore Bullets	Wheaton (Illinois) (Sr.)
8	135	Jim Sarno^{#}	F	United States	Milwaukee Bucks	Northwestern (Sr.)
8	136	Greg Fillmore	C	United States	New York Knicks	Cheyney State (Sr.)
9	137	Jim Gottschall^{#}	G	United States	San Diego Rockets	Dayton (Sr.)
9	138	Lou Small^{#}	G	United States	San Francisco Warriors	UNLV (Sr.)
9	139	Alex Winn^{#}	F	United States	Detroit Pistons	Dartmouth (Sr.)
9	140	Tom Little^{#}	G	United States	Boston Celtics	Seattle (Sr.)
9	141	Bob Mabry^{#}	F	United States	Cincinnati Royals	Rio Grande (Sr.)
9	142	Claude Virden^{#}	F	United States	Seattle SuperSonics	Murray State (Sr.)
9	143	Tom Lagodich^{#}	F	United States	Cleveland Cavaliers	Kent State (Sr.)
9	144	Billy Gaskins^{#}	G	United States	Portland Trail Blazers	Oregon (Sr.)
9	145	Larry Ducksworth^{#}	F	United States	Buffalo Braves	Arkansas AM&N (Sr.)
9	146	Carl Ashley^{#}	F	United States	Phoenix Suns	Wyoming (Sr.)
9	147	Glen Johnson^{#}	G	United States	Chicago Bulls	Jackson State (Sr.)
9	148	Mike Hauer^{#}	F	United States	Philadelphia 76ers	Saint Joseph's (Sr.)
9	149	Bobby Sands^{#}	G	United States	Los Angeles Lakers	Pepperdine (Sr.)
9	150	Larry Jackson^{#}	G	United States	Atlanta Hawks	Sul Ross State (Sr.)
9	151	Will Hetzel^{#}	F	United States	Baltimore Bullets	Maryland (Sr.)
9	152	Joe Hamilton^{#}	G	United States	Milwaukee Bucks	North Texas (Sr.)
9	153	Walker Banks^{#}	C	United States	New York Knicks	Western Kentucky (Sr.)
10	154	Toke Coleman^{#}	G	United States	San Diego Rockets	Eastern Kentucky (Sr.)
10	155	Coby Dietrick	F/C	United States	San Francisco Warriors	San Jose State (Sr.)
10	156	Bruce Chapman^{#}	F	United States	Detroit Pistons	UNLV (Sr.)
10	157	Mike Maloy^{#}	F	United States (Note: Maloy became an Austrian citizen in 1980 and played for the Austrian national team.)	Boston Celtics	Davidson (Sr.)
10	158	Carl Johnson^{#}	C	United States	Cincinnati Royals	Gustavus Adolphus (Sr.)
10	159	Chuck Lloyd^{#}	C	United States	Seattle SuperSonics	Yankton (Sr.)
10	160	Joe Taylor^{#}	F	United States	Buffalo Braves	Dillard (Sr.)
10	161	Cisco Oliver^{#}	F	United States	Portland Trail Blazers	Elizabeth City State (Sr.)
10	162	Ken Johnson^{#}	F	United States	Cleveland Cavaliers	Indiana (Sr.)
10	163	Gerhard Schreur^{#}	F	United States	Phoenix Suns	Arizona State (Sr.)
10	164	Dale Blaut^{#}	G	United States	Chicago Bulls	West Texas State (Sr.)
10	165	Gordon Stiles^{#}	G	United States	Philadelphia 76ers	American (Sr.)
10	166	Kindell Stephens^{#}	F	United States	Los Angeles Lakers	Fisk (Sr.)
10	167	Manuel Raga^{#}	F	Mexico	Atlanta Hawks	Ignis Varese (Italy)
10	168	Ron Becker^{#}	G	United States	Baltimore Bullets	New Mexico (Sr.)
10	169	Bob Seemer^{#}	F	United States	Milwaukee Bucks	Georgia Tech (Sr.)
10	170	Don Curnutt^{#}	G	United States	New York Knicks	Miami (Florida) (Sr.)
11	171	Ron Belton^{#}	F	United States	San Diego Rockets	Bellarmine (Sr.)
11	172	Rick Anheuser^{#}	F	United States	Detroit Pistons	NC State (Sr.)
11	173	Ted Hillary^{#}	F	United States	Cincinnati Royals	Saint Joseph's College (Sr.)
11	174	Andrew Owens^{#}	F	United States	Seattle SuperSonics	Florida (Sr.)
11	175	Dave Schneider^{#}	C	United States	Cleveland Cavaliers	Wayne State College (Sr.)
11	176	Dan McLemore^{#}	F	United States	Portland Trail Blazers	Bowling Green (Sr.)
11	177	Dick Walker^{#}	G	United States	Buffalo Braves	Wake Forest (Sr.)
11	178	Jim Walls^{#}	G	United States	Phoenix Suns	Clark Atlanta (Sr.)
11	179	Doug Howard^{#}	G	United States	Chicago Bulls	BYU (Sr.)
11	180	David Whitley^{#}	G	United States	Philadelphia 76ers	Tufts (Sr.)
11	181	Bob Dukiet^{#}	F	United States	Los Angeles Lakers	Boston College (Sr.)
11	182	Dino Meneghin^^{#}	C	Italy	Atlanta Hawks	Ignis Varese (Italy)
11	183	Mel Ball^{#}	F	United States	Baltimore Bullets	Houston (Sr.)
12	184	Jim Brooks^{#}	F	United States	San Diego Rockets	Nebraska (Sr.)
12	185	Don Ogletree^{#}	G	United States	Detroit Pistons	Cincinnati (Sr.)
12	186	Reggie Roach^{#}	G	United States	Cincinnati Royals	Virginia State (Sr.)
12	187	Joe Brunson^{#}	F	United States	Seattle SuperSonics	Furman (Sr.)
12	188	Paul Adams^{#}	F	United States	Portland Trail Blazers	Central Washington (Sr.)
12	189	Ollie Taylor^{#}	G	United States	Cleveland Cavaliers	Houston (Sr.)
12	190	Ric Cobb^{#}	F	United States	Phoenix Suns	Marquette (Sr.)
12	191	Booker Brown^{#}	C	United States	Chicago Bulls	Middle Tennessee (Sr.)
12	192	Dewey Varner^{#}	G	United States	Los Angeles Lakers	Tuskegee (Sr.)
12	193	Ben McGilmer^{#}	F	United States	Baltimore Bullets	Iowa (Sr.)
13	194	Harry Lozon^{#}	G	United States	San Diego Rockets	Old Dominion (Sr.)
13	195	Ernest Hardy^{#}	F	United States	Detroit Pistons	Harvard (Sr.)
13	196	Larry Gray^{#}	G	United States	Cincinnati Royals	Huston–Tillotson (Sr.)
13	197	Allen McManus^{#}	G	United States	Seattle SuperSonics	Winston-Salem State (Sr.)
13	198	Kevin Wilson^{#}	F	United States	Cleveland Cavaliers	Ashland (Sr.)
13	199	Alex Boyd^{#}	F	United States	Portland Trail Blazers	Nevada (Sr.)
13	200	Fred Carpenter^{#}	F	United States	Phoenix Suns	Hawaii (Sr.)
13	201	Charles Bloodworth^{#}	F	United States	Chicago Bulls	Northwestern State (Sr.)
13	202	Gary Elliot^{#}	F	United States	Los Angeles Lakers	Washington State (Sr.)
13	203	Don Debardelaben^{#}	F	United States	Baltimore Bullets	Northern Arizona (Sr.)
14	204	Clyde Oatis^{#}	G	United States	San Diego Rockets	Aurora (Sr.)
14	205	Randy Smith*	G/F	United States	Buffalo Braves	Buffalo State (Sr.)
14	206	Andy Jennings^{#}	F	United States	Cincinnati Royals	Alderson-Broaddus (Sr.)
14	207	Dan Beeson^{#}	F	United States	Seattle SuperSonics	Linfield (Sr.)
14	208	Frank Lothridge^{#}	F	United States	Portland Trail Blazers	Pan American (Sr.)
14	209	Don Tomilson^{#}	G	United States	Cleveland Cavaliers	Missouri (Sr.)
14	210	Chad Calabria^{#}	G	United States	Phoenix Suns	Iowa (Sr.)
14	211	Paul Funkhouser^{#}	F	United States	Chicago Bulls	McKendree (Sr.)
14	212	Ron Sanford^{#}	F	United States	Los Angeles Lakers	Noalex Venezia (Italy)
14	213	Mike Williams^{#}	F	United States	Baltimore Bullets	Northern Arizona (Sr.)
15	214	Jay Bond^{#}	C	United States	San Diego Rockets	Washington (Sr.)
15	215	Denis Clark^{#}	G	United States	Detroit Pistons	Springfield (Sr.)
15	216	Mike Neer^{#}	F	United States	Cincinnati Royals	Washington and Lee (Sr.)
15	217	Steve Wannamaker^{#}	F	United States	Cleveland Cavaliers	Drake (Sr.)
15	218	Wayne Canaday^{#}	F	United States	Portland Trail Blazers	Miami (Florida) (Sr.)
15	219	Walt Williams^{#}	G	United States	Phoenix Suns	Miami (Ohio) (Sr.)
15	220	Paul Otay^{#}	F	United States	Chicago Bulls	Boise State (Sr.)
15	221	Will Teague^{#}	C	United States	Los Angeles Lakers	Youngstown State (Sr.)
15	222	Ted Rose^{#}	F	United States	Baltimore Bullets	Northern Michigan (Sr.)
16	223	Dean Elofson^{#}	F	United States	San Diego Rockets	Wayne State College (Sr.)
16	224	Harvey Marlatt	G	United States	Detroit Pistons	Eastern Michigan (Sr.)
16	225	Paul Favorite^{#}	F	United States	Cincinnati Royals	Georgetown (Sr.)
16	226	Doug Williams^{#}	F	United States	Portland Trail Blazers	St. Mary's (Texas) (Sr.)
16	227	Steve Wilson^{#}	G	United States	Cleveland Cavaliers	Hanover (Sr.)
16	228	Pete Walthour^{#}	C	United States	Los Angeles Lakers	Fort Valley State (Sr.)
16	229	Don Rather^{#}	F	United States	Baltimore Bullets	Northern Arizona (Sr.)
17	230	Dennis Dickens^{#}	F	United States	San Diego Rockets	Azusa Pacific (Sr.)
17	231	Rich Peterson^{#}	F	United States	Cleveland Cavaliers	Concordia College (Sr.)
17	232	Bob Thati^{#}	G	United States	Los Angeles Lakers	Occidental (Sr.)
17	233	Vince Fritz^{#}	G	United States	Baltimore Bullets	Oregon State (Sr.)
18	234	Jeff Cunningham^{#}	G	United States	San Diego Rockets	UC Irvine (Sr.)
18	235	Bruce Butchko^{#}	F	United States	Portland Trail Blazers	Southern Illinois (Sr.)
18	236	Emmanuel Cannon^{#}	F	United States	Cleveland Cavaliers	Grambling State (Sr.)
19	237	Rick Erickson^{#}	G	United States	San Diego Rockets	Washington State (Sr.)
19	238	Allen Waller^{#}	F	United States	Cleveland Cavaliers	St. Mary of the Plains (Sr.)
19	239	Mark Gabriel^{#}	F	United States	Portland Trail Blazers	Hanover (Sr.)

== Trades ==
- ^{a} On February 2, 1970, the Atlanta Hawks acquired a first-round pick and future consideration (the Hawks acquired Clyde Lee on October 4, 1974) from the San Francisco Warriors in exchange for Zelmo Beaty. The Hawks used the pick to draft Pete Maravich.
- ^{b 1} ^{2} On the draft-day, the Baltimore Bullets acquired the Buffalo Braves' first-round pick from the Braves in exchange for Mike Davis and the Bullets' first-round pick. The Bullets used the pick to draft George E. Johnson while the Braves used the pick to draft John Hummer.
- ^{c} On December 25, 1969, the Cincinnati Royals acquired a second-round pick from the San Francisco Warriors in exchange for Adrian Smith. The Royals used the pick to draft Nate Archibald.
- ^{d} On November 1, 1969, the Seattle SuperSonics acquired a second-round pick from the Detroit Pistons in exchange for Erwin Mueller. The Sonics used the pick to select Jake Ford.
- ^{e} On September 13, 1969, the Phoenix Suns acquired a second-round pick from the Philadelphia 76ers in exchange for Bill Melchionni. The Suns used the pick to draft Joe DePre.
- ^{f 1} ^{2} On February 1, 1970, the Detroit Pistons acquired Bob Quick and a second-round pick from the Bullets in exchange for Eddie Miles and a fourth-round pick. The Pistons used the pick to draft Ken Warzynski. The Bullets used the pick to select Bill Stricker.

== Notable undrafted players ==
These players were not selected in the 1970 draft but played at least one game in the NBA.

Player	Pos.	Nationality	School/club team
Charlie Criss	G	United States	New Mexico State (Sr.)
Jeff Webb	G	United States	Kansas State (Sr.)

== See also ==
- List of first overall NBA draft picks
