= Bob Rule =

American basketball player (1944–2019)

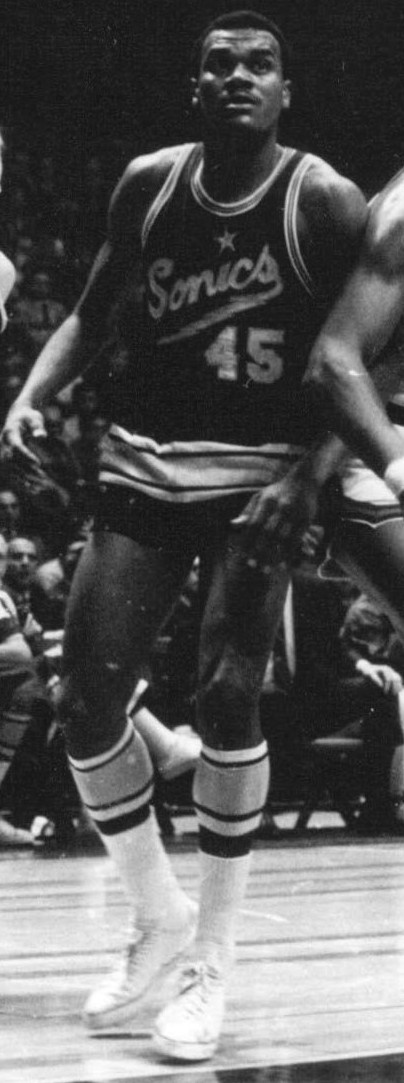
- Rule with the Seattle SuperSonics during his rookie season

Personal information
- Born: June 29, 1944 Riverside, California, U.S.
- Died: September 5, 2019 (aged 75) Riverside, California, U.S.
- Listed height: 6 ft 9 in (2.06 m)
- Listed weight: 220 lb (100 kg)

Career information
- High school: Riverside Polytechnic (Riverside, California)
- College: Riverside CC (1963–1965); Colorado State (1965–1967)
- NBA draft: 1967: 2nd round, 19th overall pick
- Drafted by: Seattle SuperSonics
- Playing career: 1967–1974
- Position: Power forward / center
- Number: 45, 21

Career history
- 1967–1971: Seattle SuperSonics
- 1971–1972: Philadelphia 76ers
- 1972–1973: Cleveland Cavaliers
- 1974: Milwaukee Bucks

Career highlights
- NBA All-Star (1970); NBA All-Rookie First Team (1968)

Career NBA statistics
- Points: 7,007 (17.4 ppg)
- Rebounds: 3,333 (8.3 rpg)
- Assists: 594 (1.5 apg)
- Stats at NBA.com
- Stats at Basketball Reference

Bobby Frank Rule (June 29, 1944 – September 5, 2019) was an American professional basketball player. He played at center in the National Basketball Association (NBA) for the Seattle SuperSonics, Philadelphia 76ers, Cleveland Cavaliers, and the Milwaukee Bucks. Rule was selected to the NBA All-Rookie team in 1968 and was chosen as an NBA All-Star in 1970. He ranked in the top 10 of scoring average during his second and third seasons. Rule's career was derailed by an Achilles tendon injury in 1971 from which he never fully recovered.

== Early years ==
Rule was born on June 29, 1944, in Riverside, California. He played YMCA basketball from fifth to ninth grades. He played high school basketball at Riverside Polytechnic High School. As a 6 ft 5 in (1.96 m) senior in 1962, he was All-Citrus Belt League (CBL) first team at center. He was second in scoring in the CBL behind future NBA player Jim Barnett from rival Ramona High School.

== College career ==
Early in his college career, Rule played two years under the legendary Hall of Fame coach Jerry Tarkanian (1962 to 1964), then head coach at Riverside Community College (now known as Riverside City College). It was under Tarkanian that Rule honed his defensive and footwork skills. In Rule's first season (1962–63), the team was 31–3, losing in the state tournament in overtime.

In 1964, Rule was named the Most Valuable Player of the California Junior College State Championships after leading the Riverside City College Tigers to a 35–0 record and the school's first state championship team. Rule led all California junior college players in scoring as a sophomore. He was reported to be an All-American at Riverside.

Looking back years later, in retirement, Tarkanian commented that Rule "might be the best player I ever coached" and that Rule was "the most dominant player in the history of California junior college basketball" and the best junior college player ever. Among the players Tarkanian coached in college were Larry Johnson, Stacey Augmon, Greg Anthony, Armen Gilliam and Isaiah Rider.

In the Winter of 1964–65, he played for the San Bernardino Coasters of the Inland Industrial League.

Rule transferred to and starred at Colorado State for two seasons. As a junior (1965–66), the 6 ft 8 in (2.03 m) Rule played forward, averaging 16.1 points and 9.8 rebounds per game; leading the Rams in rebounding. Rule's teammates included future American Basketball Association and American Football League player Lonnie Wright, and future NBA player Dale Schlueter.

In 1966, Rule and Colorado State made the NCAA tournament but lost to a Houston team that featured future Hall of Famer Elvin Hayes. Rule led the Rams with 18 points in the 82–76 loss to Houston. He fouled out in the second half of a close game. As a senior (1966–67), Rule averaged 14.8 points and 8.6 rebounds per game. He was a Rocky Mountain Region All-American with Colorado State in 1967. Rule played in the Amateur Athletic Union (AAU) for the Denver Capitol Federal during the 1966–67 season and was named an AAU All-American.

== NBA career ==
Rule was one of the best players in the NBA during his first three seasons. An Achilles tendon injury early in his fourth season derailed his career, as he never regained his All-Star form and saw limited playing time thereafter. By 1974 his career was over.

=== Seattle SuperSonics ===
The Seattle SuperSonics’ inaugural season in the NBA was 1967-68. Rule was the SuperSonics’ second-round pick in the 1967 NBA draft, 19th overall, and he quickly became one of the stars of Seattle's expansion franchise. His nickname with Seattle was “the Golden Rule”. As a rookie 6 ft 9 in (2.06 m) undersized center, Rule averaged 18.1 points and 9.5 rebounds per game. He was named to the 1967–68 first-team NBA All-Rookie Team, along with teammate Al Tucker, future Hall of Fame coach Phil Jackson, and future Hall of Fame guards Earl Monroe and Walt Frazier. Rule scored 47 points in a November 21, 1967 game against the Los Angeles Lakers; and combined with fellow rookie Al Tucker for 71 points against the Lakers in that game.

Rule's 18.1 points per game average stood as the SuperSonics rookie record for forty seasons, until broken by Kevin Durant in 2008, with a 20.3 points per game average (the team's last year in Seattle before becoming the Oklahoma City Thunder). His 71 combined point total with Tucker was a rookie duo record for the SuperSonics until broken by Durant (37) and Jeff Green (35) with 72 points, in an April 2008 double-overtime game against the Denver Nuggets. Rule's rookie rebounding average of 9.5 is the second best ever by a SuperSonics rookie, behind only Pete Cross's 12.0 in the 1970–71 season. Cross had taken Rule's place at center that season when Rule suffered a season ending injury that derailed his career. Rule's 47 points against the Los Angeles Lakers is still a SuperSonics rookie record.

Rule's game grew stronger during the next two seasons. In the 1968–69 season, he averaged 24.0 points per game and 11.5 rebounds per game. He was sixth in the NBA in scoring average that season, and 14th in rebounding average. Every player who ranked above him in scoring average is in the Naismith Basketball Hall of Fame (Elvin Hayes, Earl Monroe, Billy Cunningham, Elgin Baylor and Oscar Robertson), as were the three ranked immediately below him (Gail Goodrich, Dave Bing and Hal Greer).

In the 1969–70 season, he averaged 24.6 points per game and 10.3 rebounds per game; leading Seattle in both categories. He was seventh in the NBA in scoring average and 15th in rebounding average. Every player in the top 10 in scoring that season other than Rule is in the NBA Hall of Fame (Hayes, Cunningham, Monroe, Bing, Jerry West, Kareem Abdul-Jabbar, Lou Hudson, Connie Hawkins and John Havlicek). Rule scored 40 or more points on five separate occasions (including a then-SuperSonics record of 49 points in a game against the Philadelphia 76ers), and played in the 1970 NBA All-Star Game.

In the 1970–71 season, Rule began the season averaging 32.7 points per game and 13.7 rebounds per game over the first three games. He had 37 points and nine rebounds against the Detroit Pistons, 36 points and 15 rebounds against the Boston Celtics (and future Hall of Fame center Dave Cowens) and 25 points and 17 rebounds against the Phoenix Suns. In the fourth game, on October 23, after scoring 19 points and pulling down five rebounds in the first half against the Portland Trail Blazers he was fouled, and after making two free throws did not return to the game for the second half.

Rule's Achilles tendon had been torn on the play. He immediately was taken to a hospital and had surgery the next morning. This effectively ended his season, averaging 29.8 points per game and 11.5 rebounds per game, for his 3½ games. He started working out again in early January 1971, but the same Achilles tendon snapped for a second time while entering his car.

Rule did not give up after the second Achilles injury and went through the rehabilitation process for a second time. He made it to the SuperSonics' 1971 training camp. Rule was no longer a starter, but he played in 16 games for Seattle at the beginning of the 1971–72 season, averaging 15.2 minutes per game. There were some statements at the time indicating that Rule wanted to and could have played more, but had fallen out of favor with the coach who focused on using other players; and that because of this Rule no longer wanted to play for the SuperSonics.

=== Philadelphia 76ers, Cleveland Cavaliers, Milwaukee Bucks ===
In late November 1971, Seattle traded Rule to the Philadelphia 76ers for two future second round draft picks (1972 and 1974) and cash. Rule joined the 76ers after passing physical examinations. He started 53 games at center for the 76ers of the 60 games in which he played for them, averaging 33.1 minutes per game. He was third on the team in scoring and rebounding (17.3 points per game and 8.0 rebounds per game).

Rule held out before the start of the 1972–73 season for a better contract. He joined the 76ers on November 1, but announced he was playing out his option. Rule appeared very briefly in only three games for the 76ers that season, before being traded to the Cleveland Cavaliers less than two weeks later for Dave Sorenson. He played in 49 games for the Cavaliers as a backup center, averaging nine minutes per game. He was once again teammates with Lenny Wilkens, who had been his point guard and then coach in Seattle, under coach Bill Fitch.

Before the 1973–74 season, the Cavaliers had an intention to use Rule at starting center and rookie Jim Brewer as a backup center. In the season's first game, Rule started, but split playing time evenly with Brewer, and continued to start some games thereafter. However, after playing 26 games for the Cavaliers and averaging around 21 minutes per game, he was released in early December. At that point, he had been backing up center Steve Patterson, and went from playing over 20 and 30 minutes per game, to under 10 minutes per game. He played his last game with the Cavaliers on December 1, 1973.

The Milwaukee Bucks signed Rule in late October 1974, after Abdul-Jabbar was injured. He appeared in only one game for the Bucks, playing 11 minutes with no points, and was released by the Bucks less than two weeks later.

Over his 403-game NBA career, Rule averaged 17.4 points, 8.3 rebounds and 1.5 assists per game.

== Legacy and honors ==
Hall of Fame player and coach Lenny Wilkens, who both played with and coached Rule during his peak in Seattle, saw Rule as a player with the tremendous potential to become an outstanding player, before he was injured. He said “Bob could score, no question about that . . . He had tremendous hands. He would grip the ball like a grapefruit". Before his injuries, there are numerous examples of Rule playing extremely well against the great NBA centers of his time. Wilkens attributed this to Rule's offensive skills and ability to play around and at a distance from the basket, which was unusual for centers at the time, and his ability to run the floor. He was also described as having a left handed hook shot that was extremely difficult to defend.

In two years playing against the Boston Celtics and Bill Russell, Rule averaged around 25 points per game, including a November 8, 1968 game in Boston where he scored 37 points and had 15 rebounds against the Celtics and Russell. On December 15, 1968, he scored 37 points against Wilt Chamberlain and the Los Angeles Lakers. In a November 21, 1969 game against the Milwaukee Bucks and Kareem Abdul-Jabbar, he had 35 points and 11 rebounds. Russell, Chamberlain and Abdul-Jabbar are not only in the Naismith Hall of Fame, but are among the 76 players selected to the NBA's all-time 75th Anniversary Team.

Rule also performed at a high level against four other centers on the 75th Anniversary Team; Hayes, Nate Thurmond, Wes Unseld and Willis Reed. In Rule's rookie season, future Hall of Fame center Nate Thurmond blocked six of Rule's shots in the first half of his first game against Thurmond and the San Francisco Warriors. By his second season, Thurmond no longer had the same mastery over Rule. In a November 25, 1969 game against them, Rule had 24 points and 16 rebounds; and a few weeks later had a 33-point 11 rebound game against Thurmond and the Warriors. On December 6, 1969, he had 40 points and 12 rebounds against the Baltimore Bullets and Hall of Fame center Wes Unseld. As a rookie in November 1967, he had 20 points and 27 rebounds against the New York Knicks and Hall of Fame center Willis Reed (and Hall of Fame center Walt Bellamy), and in late December 1969, he had 25 points and nine rebounds against Reed and the Knicks. In a February 18, 1970 game against Elvin Hayes and the San Diego Rockets, Rule had 42 points and 17 rebounds.

Rule played in Seattle at a time when the SuperSonics were the city's only professional sports team, and he was one of Seattle's original professional sports stars.

Rule was inducted into the Riverside City College Athletics Hall of Fame in 2011.

== Personal life and death ==
After his playing career ended, Rule worked in the San Diego area for the Youth Basketball Academy (YBA), an organization created by the NBA and YMCA. He lived in Menifee, California, just south of Riverside.

Rule died on September 5, 2019, in Riverside, at his childhood home where his sister resided.

== NBA career statistics ==
Legend
GP	Games played	GS	Games started	MPG	Minutes per game
FG%	Field goal percentage	3P%	3-point field goal percentage	FT%	Free throw percentage
RPG	Rebounds per game	APG	Assists per game	SPG	Steals per game
BPG	Blocks per game	PPG	Points per game	**Bold**	Career high

=== Regular season ===
Year	Team	GP	MPG	FG%	FT%	RPG	APG	STL	BLK	PPG
1967–68	Seattle	**82**	29.6	**.489**	.658	9.5	1.2	–	–	18.1
1968–69	Seattle	**82**	**37.9**	.469	.682	**11.5**	1.7	–	–	24.0
1969–70	Seattle	80	37.0	.463	.714	10.3	**1.8**	–	–	24.6
1970–71	Seattle	4	35.5	.480	**.833**	**11.5**	**1.8**	–	–	**29.8**
1971–72	Seattle	16	15.2	.363	.535	3.4	0.4	–	–	7.1
1971–72	Philadelphia	60	33.1	.445	.695	8.0	1.8	–	–	17.3
1972–73	Philadelphia	3	4.0	.000	–	0.7	0.3	–	–	0.0
1972–73	Cleveland	49	9.0	.382	.645	2.2	0.8	–	–	2.9
1973–74	Cleveland	26	20.8	.396	.739	4.0	**1.8**	**.5**	**.4**	7.2
1974–75	Milwaukee	1	11.0	.000	–	0.0	2.0	0.0	0.0	0.0
Career		403	29.4	.461	.686	8.3	1.5	0.4	0.4	17.4
All-Star		1	13.0	.333	1.000	4.0	0.0	–	–	5.0
