= Marv Winkler =

American basketball player (born 1948)

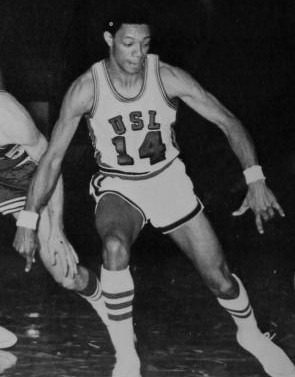

Personal information
- Born: February 18, 1948 (age 78) Indianapolis, Indiana, U.S.
- Listed height: 6 ft 1 in (1.85 m)
- Listed weight: 164 lb (74 kg)

Career information
- High school: George Washington (Indianapolis, Indiana)
- College: Louisiana (1966–1970)
- NBA draft: 1970: 3rd round, 50th overall pick
- Drafted by: Milwaukee Bucks
- Playing career: 1970–1972
- Position: Point guard
- Number: 5, 12

Career history
- 1970–1971: Milwaukee Bucks
- 1971–1972: Indiana Pacers

Career highlights
- NBA champion (1971); Third-team Parade All-American (1966)
- Stats at NBA.com
- Stats at Basketball Reference

Marvin Winkler (born February 18, 1948) is an American former professional basketball player.

A 6'1" point guard from the University of Louisiana at Lafayette, Winkler played one season (1970–71) in the National Basketball Association as a member of the Milwaukee Bucks, who drafted him with the 16th pick of the 3rd round of the 1970 NBA draft. He averaged 2.7 points per game and won a league championship when Milwaukee defeated the Baltimore Bullets in the 1971 NBA Finals.

Winkler spent the 1971–72 Championship season with the Indiana Pacers of the American Basketball Association. He averaged 2.0 points per game.

== Career statistics ==
Legend
GP	Games played	GS	Games started	MPG	Minutes per game
FG%	Field goal percentage	3P%	3-point field goal percentage	FT%	Free throw percentage
RPG	Rebounds per game	APG	Assists per game	SPG	Steals per game
BPG	Blocks per game	PPG	Points per game	**Bold**	Career high
†	Won an NBA championship

=== NBA/ABA ===
==== Regular season ====
Year	Team	GP	MPG	FG%	3P%	FT%	RPG	APG	PPG
1970–71†	Milwaukee (NBA)	3	4.7	**.300**		**1.000**	**1.3**	**.7**	**2.7**
1971–72	Indiana (ABA)	**20**	**7.8**	.278	**.500**	.571	.8	.6	2.0
Career (overall)		23	7.3	.281	.500	.625	.9	.6	2.1

==== Playoffs ====
Year	Team	GP	MPG	FG%	FT%	RPG	APG	PPG
1971†	Milwaukee (NBA)	5	1.6	.000	–	.0	.2	.0
