= 1970–71 Seattle SuperSonics season =

NBA professional basketball team season

- Head coach: Lenny Wilkens
- General manager: Bob Houbregs
- Owners: Sam Schulman
- Arena: Seattle Center Coliseum

Results
- Record: 38–44 (.463)
- Place: Division: 4th (Pacific); Conference: 8th (Western)
- Playoff finish: Did not qualify
- Stats at Basketball Reference

Local media
- Television: KTNT-TV
- Radio: KOMO

The 1970–71 Seattle SuperSonics season was the Seattle SuperSonics 4th season in the National Basketball Association (NBA). In their second season with Lenny Wilkens as head coach, the Sonics finished in 8th place in the Western Conference with a 38–44 record.

Trouble arose with the injury of top scorer Bob Rule, who tore his Achilles tendon three games into the season during a game against the Portland Trail Blazers and lost him for the remainder of the season.

== Offseason ==
During the offseason, the SuperSonics traded 10-year veteran Bob Boozer and their first round selection from the 1969 NBA draft, Lucius Allen to the Milwaukee Bucks for Don Smith (later known as Zaid Abdul-Aziz). Despite the early retirement announcement made by 24-year-old Smith to the Sonics' front office, he joined the team and played in 61 games in the regular season.

=== Draft ===
Round	Pick	Player	Position	Nationality	College
1	6	Jim Ard	F/C	United States	Cincinnati
2	20	Jake Ford	G	United States	Maryland State
2	23	Pete Cross	F/C	United States	San Francisco
3	40	Gar Heard	F	United States	Oklahoma
5	74	Boyd Lynch	F	United States	Eastern Kentucky
6	91	Samuel Robinson	SF	United States	Long Beach State
7	108	James Morgan	F	United States	Maryland
8	125	George Irvine	SF	United States	Washington
9	142	Claude Virden	SF	United States	Murray State
10	159	Chuck Lloyd	PF/C	United States	Yankton
11	174	Andy Owens	F	United States	Florida
12	187	Joe Brunson	F	United States	Furman
13	197	Allen McManus	G	United States	Winston-Salem State
14	207	Dan Beeson	F	United States	Linfield

== Roster ==
1970–71 Seattle SuperSonics roster
Players

Pos.	No.	Player	Height	Weight	DOB	From
F	43	Barry Clemens	6 ft 6 in (1.98 m)	210 lb (95 kg)	1943–05–01	Ohio Wesleyan
F/C	41	Pete Cross	6 ft 9 in (2.06 m)	230 lb (104 kg)	1948–03–28	San Francisco
G	33	Jake Ford	6 ft 3 in (1.91 m)	180 lb (82 kg)	1946–04–29	Maryland Eastern Shore
F/C	24	Spencer Haywood	6 ft 8 in (2.03 m)	225 lb (102 kg)	1949–04–22	Detroit Mercy
F	40	Gar Heard	6 ft 6 in (1.98 m)	219 lb (99 kg)	1948–05–03	Oklahoma
F	22	Don Kojis	6 ft 5 in (1.96 m)	215 lb (98 kg)	1939–01–15	Marquette
PF	14	Tom Meschery	6 ft 6 in (1.98 m)	215 lb (98 kg)	1938–10–26	Saint Mary's
F/C	45	Bob Rule	6 ft 9 in (2.06 m)	220 lb (100 kg)	1944–06–29	Colorado State
F/C	35	Don Smith	6 ft 9 in (2.06 m)	235 lb (107 kg)	1946–04–07	Iowa State
G/F	10	Dick Snyder	6 ft 5 in (1.96 m)	207 lb (94 kg)	1944–02–01	Davidson
SG	44	Rod Thorn	6 ft 4 in (1.93 m)	195 lb (88 kg)	1941–05–23	West Virginia
G	19	Lenny Wilkens	6 ft 1 in (1.85 m)	180 lb (82 kg)	1937–10–28	Providence
G	11	Lee Winfield	6 ft 2 in (1.88 m)	174 lb (79 kg)	1947–02–04	North Texas

Coaches
Head coach
- Lenny Wilkens

Legend
- (DP) Unsigned draft pick
- (FA) Free agent
- (S) Suspended
- Injured

== Standings ==
Pacific Division	W	L	PCT	GB	Home	Road	Neutral	Div
y-Los Angeles Lakers	48	34	.585	–	30–11	17–22	1–1	15–7
x-San Francisco Warriors	41	41	.500	7	20–18	19–21	2–2	12–10
San Diego Rockets	40	42	.488	8	24–15	15–26	1–1	14–8
Seattle SuperSonics	38	44	.463	10	27–13	11–30	0–1	10–14
Portland Trail Blazers	29	53	.354	19	18–21	9–26	2–6	3–15

#	Western Conference			
#	Team	W	L	PCT
1	z-Milwaukee Bucks	66	16	.805
2	y-Los Angeles Lakers	48	34	.585
3	x-Chicago Bulls	51	31	.622
4	x-San Francisco Warriors	41	41	.500
5	Phoenix Suns	48	34	.585
6	Detroit Pistons	45	37	.549
7	San Diego Rockets	40	42	.488
8	Seattle SuperSonics	38	44	.463
9	Portland Trail Blazers	29	53	.354

z – clinched division title
y – clinched division title
x – clinched playoff spot

== Game log ==
1970–71 game log
Total: 38–44 (Home: 27–13; Road: 11–30; Neutral: 0–1)
October: 5–5 (home: 4–1; road: 1–4)

Game	Date	Team	Score	High points	High rebounds	High assists	Location Attendance	Record
1	October 14	Detroit	L 117–123	Bob Rule (37)			Seattle Center Coliseum; 8,153	0–1
2	October 17	Boston	W 126–114	Bob Rule (36)			Seattle Center Coliseum; 11,617	1–1
3	October 21	Phoenix	W 110–106	Bob Rule (25)			Seattle Center Coliseum; 6,923	2–1
4	October 23	Portland	W 141–111	Dick Snyder (25)			Seattle Center Coliseum; 9,201	3–1
5	October 25	@ Milwaukee	L 107–126	Dick Snyder (24)			Milwaukee Arena; 9,340	3–2
6	October 26	@ Detroit	L 111–142	Don Smith (19)			Cobo Arena; 2,835	3–3
7	October 27	@ New York	L 104–117	Lenny Wilkens (24)			Madison Square Garden; 14,471	3–4
8	October 28	@ Cincinnati	L 118–131	Don Smith (25)			Cincinnati Gardens; 1,623	3–5
9	October 30	@ Portland	W 115–104	Lenny Wilkens (35)			Memorial Coliseum; 4,344	4–5
10	October 31	Chicago	W 122–119	Lenny Wilkens (26)			Seattle Center Coliseum; 5,727	5–5

November : 7–8 (home: 5–2; road: 2–6)

Game	Date	Team	Score	High points	High rebounds	High assists	Location Attendance	Record
11	November 3	@ Chicago	L 101–113	Lenny Wilkens (18)			Chicago Stadium; 8,244	5–6
12	November 4	@ Buffalo	W 126–101	Tom Meschery (22)			Buffalo Memorial Auditorium; 2,093	6–6
13	November 6	@ Boston	L 94–116	Dick Snyder (28)			Boston Garden; 5,852	6–7
14	November 7	@ Philadelphia	L 128–134	Lenny Wilkens (32)			The Spectrum; 7,623	6–8
15	November 8	@ Cleveland	W 111–105	Dick Snyder (30)			Cleveland Arena; 2,448	7–8
16	November 10	New York	W 93–91	Dick Snyder (26)			Seattle Center Coliseum; 11,022	8–8
17	November 13	Cleveland	W 111–91	Dick Snyder (26)			Seattle Center Coliseum; 6,961	9–8
18	November 16	Buffalo	L 103–112	Dick Snyder (20)			Portland, OR; 3,189	9–9
19	November 19	Los Angeles	W 111–110	Don Kojis (26)			Seattle Center Coliseum; 9,717	10–9
20	November 20	@ San Diego	L 106–121	Three players (17)			San Diego Sports Arena; 4,211	10–10
21	November 21	San Diego	L 114–115	Lee Winfield (36)			Seattle Center Coliseum; 11,316	10–11
22	November 22	@ Los Angeles	L 124–149	snyuder (29)			The Forum; 11,763	10–12
23	November 26	@ Phoenix	L 115–126	Lee Winfield (19)			Arizona Veterans Memorial Coliseum; 7,192	10–13
24	November 27	San Francisco	W 101–96	Lenny Wilkens (31)			Seattle Center Coliseum; 10,024	11–13
25	November 29	Atlanta	W 130–107	Lenny Wilkens (41)			Seattle Center Coliseum; 12,965	12–13

December : 6–9 (home: 4–4; road: 2–5)

Game	Date	Team	Score	High points	High rebounds	High assists	Location Attendance	Record
26	December 1	@ New York	L 109–114	Lenny Wilkens (29)			Madison Square Garden; 17,449	12–14
27	December 2	@ Cincinnati	W 119–111	Don Kojis (30)			Cincinnati Gardens; 1,823	13–14
28	December 4	@ Baltimore	L 116–131	Don Kojis, Dick Snyder (22)			Baltimore Civic Center; 3,050	13–15
29	December 5	@ Atlanta	L 100–106	Lenny Wilkens (17)			Alexander Memorial Coliseum; 5,922	13–16
30	December 8	@ Philadelphia	W 107–104	Three players (21)			The Spectrum; 3,584	14–16
31	December 9	@ Boston	L 121–136	Dick Snyder (28)			Boston Garden; 4,608	14–17
32	December 11	Los Angeles	L 118–126	Don Kojis (24)			Seattle Center Coliseum; 10,685	14–18
33	December 13	Milwaukee	L 107–124	Don Kojis (29)			Seattle Center Coliseum; 12,627	14–19
34	December 16	@ San Francisco	L 91–108	Lenny Wilkens (28)			Oakland–Alameda County Coliseum Arena; 2,218	14–20
35	December 17	Philadelphia	L 117–125	Lee Winfield (25)			Seattle Center Coliseum; 4,739	14–21
36	December 19	Phoenix	W 135–131	Don Kojis (36)			Seattle Center Coliseum; 6,443	15–21
37	December 20	San Diego	L 108–110	Lenny Wilkens (28)			Seattle Center Coliseum; 5,702	15–22
38	December 22	New York	W 119–108	Tom Meschery, Lenny Wilkens (20)			Seattle Center Coliseum; 8,827	16–22
39	December 26	Boston	W 124–117	Dick Snyder (29)			Seattle Center Coliseum; 10,806	17–22
40	December 30	Chicago	W 128–109	Dick Snyder (25)			Seattle Center Coliseum; 12,935	18–22

January : 7–8 (home: 4–2; road: 3–6)

Game	Date	Team	Score	High points	High rebounds	High assists	Location Attendance	Record
41	January 1	Portland	W 121–118	Lenny Wilkens (24)			Seattle Center Coliseum; 9,012	19–22
42	January 4	@ Milwaukee	L 110–124	Don Kojis (24)			Milwaukee Arena; 8,835	19–23
43	January 5	@ Baltimore	L 101–109	Lenny Wilkens (27)			Baltimore Civic Center; 4,631	19–24
44	January 6	@ Boston	L 112–137	Dick Snyder (26)			Boston Garden; 4,152	19–25
45	January 8	@ Buffalo	W 110–102	Lenny Wilkens (30)			Buffalo Memorial Auditorium; 3,024	20–25
46	January 9	@ Cincinnati	W 114–110	Don Kojis (29)			Cincinnati Gardens; 3,879	21–25
47	January 14	Baltimore	W 114–110	Lenny Wilkens (34)			Clarence S. "Hec" Edmundson Pavilion; 7,093	22–25
48	January 17	Baltimore	L 96–111	Lenny Wilkens (20)			Clarence S. "Hec" Edmundson Pavilion; 7,557	22–26
49	January 19	@ Detroit	L 102–106	Spencer Haywood (24)			Cobo Arena; 5,287	22–27
50	January 20	@ Atlanta	W 112–108	Lenny Wilkens (24)			Alexander Memorial Coliseum; 4,661	23–27
51	January 22	Cincinnati	W 132–131 (OT)	Spencer Haywood (30)			Seattle Center Coliseum; 12,657	24–27
52	January 24	Philadelphia	L 119–145	Spencer Haywood (30)			Seattle Center Coliseum; 12,841	24–28
53	January 28	Buffalo	W 120–110	Dick Snyder (35)			Seattle Center Coliseum; 7,452	25–28
54	January 29	@ Los Angeles	L 115–122	Dick Snyder (26)			The Forum; 12,547	25–29
55	January 30	@ Phoenix	L 116–134	Spencer Haywood (29)			Arizona Veterans Memorial Coliseum; 10,412	25–30

February : 6–9 (home: 5–4; road: 1–5)

Game	Date	Team	Score	High points	High rebounds	High assists	Location Attendance	Record
56	February 2	@ Chicago	L 101–118	Dick Snyder (24)			Chicago Stadium; 8,813	25–31
57	February 3	@ Cleveland	W 98–95	Lenny Wilkens (30)			Cleveland Arena; 2,515	26–31
58	February 5	Atlanta	L 120–121 (OT)	Lenny Wilkens (30)			Seattle Center Coliseum; 13,136	26–32
59	February 7	San Diego	L 107–124	Spencer Haywood (25)			Seattle Center Coliseum; 8,259	26–33
60	February 9	@ San Diego	L 115–132	Spencer Haywood (22)			San Diego Sports Arena; 4,192	26–34
61	February 10	@ San Francisco	L 122–133	Spencer Haywood (26)			Oakland–Alameda County Coliseum Arena; 2,913	26–35
62	February 11	Cincinnati	W 119–101	Dick Snyder (31)			Seattle Center Coliseum; 13,013	27–35
63	February 12	@ Portland	L 125–137	Lee Winfield (23)			Memorial Coliseum; 7,313	27–36
64	February 14	San Francisco	W 146–101	Spencer Haywood (25)			Seattle Center Coliseum; 10,529	28–36
65	February 17	Portland	W 130–126	Dick Snyder (25)			Seattle Center Coliseum; 6,679	29–36
66	February 19	Milwaukee	L 112–128	Dick Snyder (31)			Seattle Center Coliseum; 12,685	29–37
67	February 21	Philadelphia	W 135–128	Lenny Wilkens (28)			Seattle Center Coliseum; 8,003	30–37
68	February 24	Cleveland	W 123–101	Dick Snyder (24)			Seattle Center Coliseum; 5,631	31–37
69	February 26	@ Los Angeles	L 121–145	Tom Meschery (24)			The Forum; 14,294	31–38
70	February 27	Chicago	L 114–129	Don Kojis, Lee Winfield (20)			Seattle Center Coliseum; 10,801	31–39

March : 7–5 (home: 5–1; road: 2–4)

Game	Date	Team	Score	High points	High rebounds	High assists	Location Attendance	Record
71	March 2	Atlanta	L 116–128	Dick Snyder (22)			Seattle Center Coliseum; 9,810	31–40
72	March 5	@ San Diego	W 111–110	Dick Snyder (28)			San Diego Sports Arena; 10,138	32–40
73	March 6	Los Angeles	W 121–109	Don Smith (21)			Seattle Center Coliseum; 12,949	33–40
74	March 8	@ Milwaukee	L 99–104	Spencer Haywood (30)			Milwaukee Arena; 10,746	33–41
75	March 9	@ New York	W 114–99	Don Smith (37)			Madison Square Garden; 19,500	34–41
76	March 11	Detroit	W 130–97	Don Smith (29)			Clarence S. "Hec" Edmundson Pavilion; 5,681	35–41
77	March 12	@ San Francisco	L 98–111	Spencer Haywood (23)			Oakland–Alameda County Coliseum Arena; 5,122	35–42
78	March 14	Baltimore	W 124–121	Spencer Haywood (35)			Clarence S. "Hec" Edmundson Pavilion; 5,810	36–42
79	March 18	Milwaukee	W 122–121	Don Smith (28)			Clarence S. "Hec" Edmundson Pavilion; 8,970	37–42
80	March 19	@ Portland	L 128–135	Spencer Haywood (32)			Memorial Coliseum; 11,140	37–43
81	March 20	@ Phoenix	L 107–114	Jake Ford, Gar Heard (17)			Arizona Veterans Memorial Coliseum; 7,134	37–44
82	March 21	San Francisco	W 119–106	Dick Snyder (23)			Clarence S. "Hec" Edmundson Pavilion; 7,634	38–44

1970–71 season schedule

== Player statistics ==
Legend
GP	Games played	GS	Games started	MPG	Minutes per game
FG%	Field-goal percentage	3P%	3-point field-goal percentage	FT%	Free-throw percentage
RPG	Rebounds per game	APG	Assists per game	SPG	Steals per game
BPG	Blocks per game	PPG	Points per game

Player	GP	GS	MPG	FG%	3FG%	FT%	RPG	APG	SPG	BPG	PPG
Tom Black ^{[a]}	55	–	14.1	.414	–	.699	4.1	.8	–	–	5.0
Barry Clemens	78	–	16.5	.470	–	.728	3.1	1.2	–	–	7.4
Pete Cross	79	–	27.8	.442	–	.690	12.0	1.4	–	–	8.0
Bob Rule	4	–	35.5	.480	–	.833	11.5	1.8	–	–	29.8
Jake Ford	5	–	13.6	.360	–	.727	1.8	1.8	–	–	6.8
Spencer Haywood	33	–	35.2	.449	–	.734	12.0	1.5	–	–	20.6
Gar Heard	65	–	15.8	.381	–	.656	5.0	.7	–	–	5.9
Don Kojis	79	–	27.1	.446	–	.778	5.5	1.6	–	–	14.6
Tom Meschery	79	–	23.1	.463	–	.750	6.1	1.4	–	–	9.3
Don Smith	61	–	20.9	.441	–	.739	7.7	.7	–	–	10.9
Dick Snyder	82	–	34.4	.531	–	.837	3.1	4.3	–	–	19.4
Rod Thorn	63	–	12.2	.472	–	.676	1.6	2.9	–	–	5.6
Lenny Wilkens	71	–	37.2	.419	–	.803	4.5	9.2	–	–	19.8
Lee Winfield	79	–	20.3	.466	–	.664	2.4	2.8	–	–	10.5

- ^{a} Statistics with the Seattle SuperSonics.

== Awards and records ==
- Lenny Wilkens was named Most Valuable Player at the 1971 NBA All-Star Game.

== Transactions ==
=== Overview ===
Players Added

Via draft

- Jake Ford
- Gar Heard

Via trade

- Don Kojis
- Don Smith

Via free agency

- Tom Black (later waived)
- Spencer Haywood ^{[^]}
Players Lost

Via trade

- Bob Boozer
- Lucius Allen

^{^} The Sonics signed Haywood as a free agent after he spent a season with the American Basketball Association's Denver Rockets, who signed Haywood after his sophomore year at the University of Detroit Mercy under a hardship clause. Because eligibility rules of the National Basketball Association at the time required a span of four years after high school graduation for a player to be picked by any team, a legal battle ensued, with the federal court ruling in favor of Haywood.

=== Trades ===
September 17, 1970	To Seattle SuperSonics Don Smith; Cash considerations	To Milwaukee Bucks Lucius Allen; Bob Boozer
