= 1970–71 San Diego Rockets season =

- Head coach: Alex Hannum
- General manager: Pete Newell
- Owner: Bob Breitbard
- Arena: San Diego Sports Arena

Results
- Record: 40–42 (.488)
- Place: Division: 3rd (Pacific); Conference: 7th (Western)
- Playoff finish: Did not qualify
- Stats at Basketball Reference

Local media
- Television: KCST-TV
- Radio: KOGO

The 1970–71 San Diego Rockets season was the Rockets' 4th season in the NBA. The franchise also hosted the 1971 NBA All-Star Game. However, they missed the playoffs and finished the regular season with a 40–42 record. This was also the team's final season in San Diego, as the franchise relocated to Houston, Texas following the season.

== Roster ==
1970–71 San Diego Rockets roster
Players

Pos.	No.	Player	Height	Weight	DOB	From
SF	32	Don Adams	6 ft 6 in (1.98 m)	210 lb (95 kg)	1947-11-27	Northwestern
PF	34	John Block	6 ft 9 in (2.06 m)	207 lb (94 kg)	1944-04-16	USC
PG	21	Johnny Egan	5 ft 11 in (1.80 m)	180 lb (82 kg)	1939-01-31	Providence
C	11	Elvin Hayes	6 ft 9 in (2.06 m)	235 lb (107 kg)	1945-11-17	Houston
PF	7	Toby Kimball	6 ft 6 in (1.98 m)	220 lb (100 kg)	1942-09-07	Connecticut
SG	22	Stu Lantz	6 ft 3 in (1.91 m)	175 lb (79 kg)	1946-07-13	Nebraska
PG	23	Calvin Murphy	5 ft 9 in (1.75 m)	165 lb (75 kg)	1948-05-09	Niagara
C	54	Curtis Perry	6 ft 7 in (2.01 m)	215 lb (98 kg)	1948-09-13	Missouri State
PG	20	Larry Siegfried	6 ft 3 in (1.91 m)	190 lb (86 kg)	1939-05-22	Ohio State
PF	45	Rudy Tomjanovich	6 ft 8 in (2.03 m)	218 lb (99 kg)	1948-11-24	Michigan
SF	31	John Q. Trapp	6 ft 7 in (2.01 m)	210 lb (95 kg)	1945-10-02	UNLV
SG	35	Bernie Williams	6 ft 3 in (1.91 m)	175 lb (79 kg)	1945-12-30	La Salle

Coaches
Head coach
- Alex Hannum

Legend
- (DP) Unsigned draft pick
- (FA) Free agent
- (S) Suspended
- Injured

Roster
Updated: December 9, 1970

== Regular season ==
=== Season standings ===
Pacific Division	W	L	PCT	GB	Home	Road	Neutral	Div
y-Los Angeles Lakers	48	34	.585	–	30–11	17–22	1–1	15–7
x-San Francisco Warriors	41	41	.500	7	20–18	19–21	2–2	12–10
San Diego Rockets	40	42	.488	8	24–15	15–26	1–1	14–8
Seattle SuperSonics	38	44	.463	10	27–13	11–30	0–1	10–14
Portland Trail Blazers	29	53	.354	19	18–21	9–26	2–6	3–15

#	Western Conference			
#	Team	W	L	PCT
1	z-Milwaukee Bucks	66	16	.805
2	y-Los Angeles Lakers	48	34	.585
3	x-Chicago Bulls	51	31	.622
4	x-San Francisco Warriors	41	41	.500
5	Phoenix Suns	48	34	.585
6	Detroit Pistons	45	37	.549
7	San Diego Rockets	40	42	.488
8	Seattle SuperSonics	38	44	.463
9	Portland Trail Blazers	29	53	.354

=== Game log ===
1970–71 Game log
#	Date	Opponent	Score	High points	Record
1	October 13	@ Chicago	96–111	Stu Lantz (24)	0–1
2	October 14	@ Baltimore	105–123	John Trapp (20)	0–2
3	October 16	@ Philadelphia	119–127	Elvin Hayes (34)	0–3
4	October 17	@ Buffalo	102–93	Elvin Hayes (30)	1–3
5	October 20	Phoenix	114–115	Stu Lantz (43)	2–3
6	October 22	Cleveland	110–140	Elvin Hayes (40)	3–3
7	October 24	Philadelphia	111–116	John Block (32)	4–3
8	October 25	@ Phoenix	98–117	Hayes, Murphy (29)	4–4
9	October 27	@ Milwaukee	113–126	Elvin Hayes (34)	4–5
10	October 28	@ Cleveland	110–99	Elvin Hayes (40)	5–5
11	October 29	@ New York	107–114	Calvin Murphy (23)	5–6
12	October 31	@ Atlanta	121–117	Elvin Hayes (32)	6–6
13	November 4	New York	109–100	Stu Lantz (28)	6–7
14	November 6	Baltimore	125–118	Elvin Hayes (35)	6–8
15	November 7	@ San Francisco	102–114	Elvin Hayes (45)	6–9
16	November 11	Cincinnati	120–127	Stu Lantz (38)	7–9
17	November 13	San Francisco	107–102	Stu Lantz (23)	7–10
18	November 14	Detroit	101–112	Stu Lantz (29)	8–10
19	November 16	@ Portland	136–118	Elvin Hayes (29)	9–10
20	November 18	Milwaukee	117–111	Don Adams (23)	9–11
21	November 20	Seattle	106–121	Elvin Hayes (50)	10–11
22	November 21	@ Seattle	115–114	Elvin Hayes (33)	11–11
23	November 24	@ Detroit	104–111	Hayes, Siegfried (28)	11–12
24	November 25	@ Cincinnati	138–120	Elvin Hayes (48)	12–12
25	November 27	Atlanta	127–128	Don Adams (33)	13–12
26	November 28	@ Phoenix	117–116	Elvin Hayes (37)	14–12
27	November 29	@ Los Angeles	112–130	Don Adams (28)	14–13
28	December 1	@ Portland	120–114	Elvin Hayes (37)	15–13
29	December 5	Los Angeles	116–119	Elvin Hayes (38)	16–13
30	December 6	@ Phoenix	102–108	Elvin Hayes (31)	16–14
31	December 11	Phoenix	104–110	Elvin Hayes (33)	17–14
32	December 12	@ Chicago	98–103	Elvin Hayes (25)	17–15
33	December 13	@ Cleveland	118–95	Elvin Hayes (40)	18–15
34	December 15	@ Philadelphia	98–122	Don Adams (16)	18–16
35	December 16	@ Atlanta	117–128	Stu Lantz (31)	18–17
36	December 18	Detroit	129–116	Elvin Hayes (23)	18–18
37	December 19	N Portland	118–108	Elvin Hayes (35)	19–18
38	December 20	@ Seattle	110–108	Elvin Hayes (35)	20–18
39	December 23	Atlanta	102–133	Elvin Hayes (29)	21–18
40	December 27	Chicago	110–101	Elvin Hayes (28)	21–19
41	December 29	Boston	110–108	Elvin Hayes (37)	21–20
42	January 1	@ Los Angeles	117–106	Elvin Hayes (40)	22–20
43	January 2	Los Angeles	108–109 (OT)	Elvin Hayes (25)	23–20
44	January 5	@ Chicago	103–116	Calvin Murphy (36)	23–21
45	January 6	@ Detroit	99–100	Elvin Hayes (23)	23–22
46	January 8	San Francisco	120–117	Elvin Hayes (28)	23–23
47	January 9	@ San Francisco	103–109	Don Adams (21)	23–24
48	January 15	Baltimore	124–117	Elvin Hayes (29)	23–25
49	January 17	Philadelphia	106–105	Stu Lantz (28)	23–26
50	January 19	@ New York	113–117 (OT)	Elvin Hayes (29)	23–27
51	January 20	@ Boston	112–142	Elvin Hayes (30)	23–28
52	January 22	@ Buffalo	94–101	Elvin Hayes (30)	23–29
53	January 23	@ Baltimore	120–127	Stu Lantz (26)	23–30
54	January 25	Buffalo	106–114	Stu Lantz (37)	24–30
55	January 27	Chicago	111–106	Stu Lantz (26)	24–31
56	January 29	@ Detroit	104–131	Stu Lantz (27)	24–32
57	January 30	@ Cincinnati	110–116	Elvin Hayes (44)	24–33
58	January 31	@ Atlanta	120–131	Elvin Hayes (39)	24–34
59	February 2	@ Los Angeles	105–133	Elvin Hayes (27)	24–35
60	February 3	Milwaukee	108–101	Elvin Hayes (41)	24–36
61	February 5	Cleveland	105–116	Elvin Hayes (32)	25–36
62	February 6	Los Angeles	115–108	Elvin Hayes (33)	25–37
63	February 7	@ Seattle	124–107	Elvin Hayes (32)	26–37
64	February 9	Seattle	115–132	Elvin Hayes (36)	27–37
65	February 11	San Francisco	111–119	Stu Lantz (31)	28–37
66	February 13	Cincinnati	116–120	Don Adams (24)	29–37
67	February 18	New York	116–115	Elvin Hayes (33)	29–38
68	February 19	@ San Francisco	109–103	Calvin Murphy (30)	30–38
69	February 20	Boston	118–128	Elvin Hayes (33)	31–38
70	February 23	@ New York	126–109	Hayes, Murphy (29)	32–38
71	February 24	@ Milwaukee	104–139	Elvin Hayes (23)	32–39
72	March 2	@ Philadelphia	111–103	Calvin Murphy (27)	33–39
73	March 3	@ Boston	113–128	Elvin Hayes (35)	33–40
74	March 5	Seattle	111–110	Hayes, Lantz (27)	33–41
75	March 6	N Chicago	99–105	Elvin Hayes (27)	33–42
76	March 7	Portland	121–135	Elvin Hayes (39)	34–42
77	March 9	Buffalo	96–106	Elvin Hayes (27)	35–42
78	March 11	Boston	91–115	Stu Lantz (29)	36–42
79	March 13	Baltimore	115–121	John Block (30)	37–42
80	March 17	Detroit	99–106	Elvin Hayes (28)	38–42
81	March 19	Milwaukee	99–111	John Trapp (24)	39–42
82	March 21	Phoenix	114–132	Elvin Hayes (34)	40–42

== Awards and records ==
- Calvin Murphy, NBA All-Rookie Team 1st Team
