= Jake Ford =

American basketball player (1946–1996)

Personal information
- Born: April 29, 1946 Georgetown, South Carolina, U.S.
- Died: May 19, 1996 (aged 50)
- Listed height: 6 ft 3 in (1.91 m)
- Listed weight: 180 lb (82 kg)

Career information
- High school: Fifth Avenue (Pittsburgh, Pennsylvania)
- College: Maryland Eastern Shore (1966–1970)
- NBA draft: 1970: 2nd round, 20th overall pick
- Drafted by: Seattle SuperSonics
- Playing career: 1970–1972
- Position: Point guard
- Number: 33

Career history
- 1970–1972: Seattle SuperSonics

Career highlights
- NAIA tournament MVP (1969)
- Stats at NBA.com
- Stats at Basketball Reference

Jake Ford (April 29, 1946 – May 19, 1996) was a point guard who played in the National Basketball Association. He was drafted in the second round of the 1970 NBA draft by the Seattle SuperSonics and played two seasons with the team. He had previously been drafted by the Cincinnati Royals in the fifth round in 1969.

== Career statistics ==
Legend
GP	Games played	GS	Games started	MPG	Minutes per game
FG%	Field goal percentage	3P%	3-point field goal percentage	FT%	Free throw percentage
RPG	Rebounds per game	APG	Assists per game	SPG	Steals per game
BPG	Blocks per game	PPG	Points per game	**Bold**	Career high

=== NBA ===
==== Regular season ====
Year	Team	GP	MPG	FG%	FT%	RPG	APG	PPG
1970–71	Seattle	5	**13.6**	.360	.727	**1.8**	**1.8**	**6.8**
1971–72	Seattle	**26**	7.0	**.500**	**.788**	.4	1.0	3.5
Career		31	8.0	.462	.764	.6	1.1	4.1
