= Joe Thomas (basketball) =

American basketball player

Personal information
- Born: March 9, 1948 (age 78) Canton, Georgia, U.S.
- Listed height: 6 ft 6 in (1.98 m)
- Listed weight: 205 lb (93 kg)

Career information
- High school: Marist School (Atlanta, Georgia)
- College: Marquette (1967–1970)
- NBA draft: 1970: 6th round, 95th overall pick
- Drafted by: Phoenix Suns
- Playing career: 1970–1971
- Position: Small forward
- Number: 40

Career history
- 1970–1971: Phoenix Suns

Career highlights
- NIT champion (1970)
- Stats at NBA.com
- Stats at Basketball Reference

Joseph Randle Thomas (born March 9, 1948) is an American former basketball player who played in the National Basketball Association (NBA). He was drafted in the sixth round of the 1970 NBA draft by the Phoenix Suns and would play the 1970–71 NBA season with them.

After his brief professional basketball career ended, Thomas earned his juris doctor (J.D.) in 1975 and practiced law for over 30 years.

== Career statistics ==
Legend
GP	Games played	GS	Games started	MPG	Minutes per game
FG%	Field goal percentage	3P%	3-point field goal percentage	FT%	Free throw percentage
RPG	Rebounds per game	APG	Assists per game	SPG	Steals per game
BPG	Blocks per game	PPG	Points per game	**Bold**	Career high

=== NBA ===
==== Regular season ====
Year	Team	GP	MPG	FG%	FT%	RPG	APG	PPG
1970–71	Phoenix	39	5.2	.267	.450	1.1	.4	1.4
