= 1970–71 Los Angeles Lakers season =

NBA professional basketball team season

- Division champions
- Head coach: Joe Mullaney
- Owners: Jack Kent Cooke
- Arena: The Forum

Results
- Record: 48–34 (.585)
- Place: Division: 1st (Pacific); Conference: 2nd (Western)
- Playoff finish: Conference finals (lost to Bucks 1–4)
- Stats at Basketball Reference

The 1970–71 Los Angeles Lakers season was the Lakers' 23rd season in the NBA and 11th season in Los Angeles.

The Lakers, handicapped by the loss of star Jerry West to a season-ending injury with 13 games remaining in the regular season, would be eliminated by the eventual champions, the Milwaukee Bucks, in five games in the Western Conference finals.

The team's season roster is featured in the video games NBA 2K16, NBA 2K17, and NBA 2K18.

== Roster ==
1970–71 Los Angeles Lakers roster
Players

Pos.	No.	Player	Height	Weight	DOB	From
SF	22	Elgin Baylor	6 ft 5 in (1.96 m)	225 lb (102 kg)	1934-09-16	Seattle
C	13	Wilt Chamberlain	7 ft 1 in (2.16 m)	275 lb (125 kg)	1936-08-21	Kansas
SF	24	Keith Erickson	6 ft 5 in (1.96 m)	195 lb (88 kg)	1944-04-19	UCLA
SG	25	Gail Goodrich	6 ft 1 in (1.85 m)	170 lb (77 kg)	1943-04-23	UCLA
PF	52	Happy Hairston	6 ft 7 in (2.01 m)	225 lb (102 kg)	1942-05-31	NYU
SF	30	Fred Hetzel	6 ft 8 in (2.03 m)	220 lb (100 kg)	1942-07-21	Davidson
G	20	Earnie Killum	6 ft 3 in (1.91 m)	180 lb (82 kg)	1948-06-11	Stetson
SG	15	Willie McCarter	6 ft 3 in (1.91 m)	175 lb (79 kg)	1946-07-26	Drake
SF	5	Jim McMillian	6 ft 5 in (1.96 m)	215 lb (98 kg)	1948-03-11	Columbia
SG	12	Pat Riley	6 ft 4 in (1.93 m)	205 lb (93 kg)	1945-03-20	Kentucky
C	35	Rick Roberson	6 ft 9 in (2.06 m)	231 lb (105 kg)	1947-07-07	Cincinnati
PF	14	John Tresvant	6 ft 7 in (2.01 m)	215 lb (98 kg)	1939-11-06	Seattle
PG	44	Jerry West	6 ft 3 in (1.91 m)	175 lb (79 kg)	1938-05-28	West Virginia

Coaches
Head coach
- Joe Mullaney

Legend
- (DP) Unsigned draft pick
- (FA) Free agent
- (S) Suspended
- Injured

Roster
Updated: November 11, 1970

== Regular season ==
=== Season standings ===
Pacific Division	W	L	PCT	GB	Home	Road	Neutral	Div
y-Los Angeles Lakers	48	34	.585	–	30–11	17–22	1–1	15–7
x-San Francisco Warriors	41	41	.500	7	20–18	19–21	2–2	12–10
San Diego Rockets	40	42	.488	8	24–15	15–26	1–1	14–8
Seattle SuperSonics	38	44	.463	10	27–13	11–30	0–1	10–14
Portland Trail Blazers	29	53	.354	19	18–21	9–26	2–6	3–15

#	Western Conference			
#	Team	W	L	PCT
1	z-Milwaukee Bucks	66	16	.805
2	y-Los Angeles Lakers	48	34	.585
3	x-Chicago Bulls	51	31	.622
4	x-San Francisco Warriors	41	41	.500
5	Phoenix Suns	48	34	.585
6	Detroit Pistons	45	37	.549
7	San Diego Rockets	40	42	.488
8	Seattle SuperSonics	38	44	.463
9	Portland Trail Blazers	29	53	.354

z – clinched division title
y – clinched division title
x – clinched playoff spot

=== Game log ===
1970–71 game log
Total: 48–34 (Home: 30–11; Road: 17–22)
October: 4–3 (home: 2–1; road: 2–2)

Game	Date	Team	Score	High points	High rebounds	High assists	Location Attendance	Record
1	October 16, 1970	@ Chicago	W 102–106	Jerry West (29)			Chicago Stadium	1–0
2	October 17, 1970	@ Baltimore	116–118 (OT)	Jerry West (34)				1–1
3	October 20, 1970	@ New York	L 100–115	Jerry West (26)				1–2
4	October 21, 1970	@ Philadelphia	141–117	Jerry West (37)				2–2
5	October 23, 1970	Philadelphia	127–122	Wilt Chamberlain (34)				2–3
6	October 25, 1970	Cleveland	96–123	Wilt Chamberlain (24)				3–3
7	October 30	Buffalo	90–104	Wilt Chamberlain (20)				4–3

November : 0–0 (home: 0–0; road: 0–0)

Game	Date	Team	Score	High points	High rebounds	High assists	Location Attendance	Record
8	November 3	@ Portland	128–108	Wilt Chamberlain (23)	5–3			
9	November 6	New York	104–106	Gail Goodrich (33)	6–3			
10	November 8	Baltimore	105–124	Jerry West (41)	7–3			
11	November 10	@ Chicago	96–118	Goodrich, West (22)	7–4			
12	November 11	@ Detroit	117–115	Wilt Chamberlain (27)	8–4			
13	November 13	Detroit	109–122	Goodrich, West (28)	9–4			
14	November 17	Atlanta	105–116	Jerry West (34)	10–4			
15	November 19	@ Seattle	110–111	Wilt Chamberlain (32)	10–5			
16	November 20	Milwaukee	117–100	Wilt Chamberlain (28)	10–6			
17	November 22	Seattle	124–149	Wilt Chamberlain (31)	11–6			
18	November 27	Phoenix	116–105	Jerry West (33)	11–7			
19	November 28	@ San Francisco	88–92	Gail Goodrich (25)	11–8			
20	November 29	San Diego	112–130	Jerry West (41)	12–8			

December : 0–0 (home: 0–0; road: 0–0)

Game	Date	Team	Score	High points	High rebounds	High assists	Location Attendance	Record
21	December 1	@ Baltimore	97–93	Jerry West (37)	13–8			
22	December 2	@ Boston	111–114	Wilt Chamberlain (29)	13–9			
23	December 4	San Francisco	101–123	Jerry West (30)	14–9			
24	December 5	@ San Diego	116–119	Wilt Chamberlain (36)	14–10			
25	December 6	Portland	120–131	Chamberlain, West (31)	15–10			
26	December 8	@ Phoenix	121–112	Wilt Chamberlain (36)	16–10			
27	December 11	@ Seattle	126–118	Jerry West (37)	17–10			
28	December 13	Detroit	103–100	Jerry West (33)	17–11			
29	December 15	@ Buffalo	111–113 (OT)	Jerry West (27)	17–12			
30	December 16	@ Cincinnati	118–102	Wilt Chamberlain (35)	18–12			
31	December 19	@ Atlanta	116–104	Jerry West (36)	19–12			
32	December 21	@ Milwaukee	88–113	Wilt Chamberlain (25)	19–13			
33	December 22	Atlanta	119–115	Jerry West (24)	19–14			
34	December 25	Boston	113–123	Jerry West (32)	20–14			
35	December 27	Phoenix	110–128	Jerry West (35)	21–14			
36	December 29	Chicago	117–126	Wilt Chamberlain (34)	22–14			
37	December 30	@ Phoenix	114–132	Wilt Chamberlain (32)	22–15			

January : 0–0 (home: 0–0; road: 0–0)

Game	Date	Team	Score	High points	High rebounds	High assists	Location Attendance	Record
38	January 1	San Diego	117–106	Jerry West (41)	22–16			
39	January 2	@ San Diego	108–109 (OT)	Happy Hairston (30)	22–17			
40	January 5	N Cincinnati	112–146	Wilt Chamberlain (41)	22–18			
41	January 7	@ Cleveland	110–105	Happy Hairston (25)	23–18			
42	January 8	@ Philadelphia	123–117	Gail Goodrich (29)	24–18			
43	January 10	@ Detroit	109–118	Chamberlain, West (25)	24–19			
44	January 14	N Cincinnati	126–120	Jerry West (33)	25–19			
45	January 16	@ Atlanta	123–127	Jerry West (27)	25–20			
46	January 19	Philadelphia	114–134	Jerry West (33)	26–20			
47	January 22	San Francisco	110–130	Jerry West (28)	27–20			
48	January 24	Cincinnati	131–142	Wilt Chamberlain (35)	28–20			
49	January 26	Chicago	111–136	Jerry West (33)	29–20			
50	January 28	@ Phoenix	112–118	Jerry West (27)	29–21			
51	January 29	Seattle	115–122	Happy Hairston (29)	30–21			
52	January 30	@ San Francisco	85–87	Jerry West (23)	30–22			
53	January 31	Portland	120–133	Wilt Chamberlain (33)	31–22			

February : 0–0 (home: 0–0; road: 0–0)

Game	Date	Team	Score	High points	High rebounds	High assists	Location Attendance	Record
54	February 2	San Diego	105–133	Jerry West (28)	32–22			
55	February 5	Milwaukee	93–116	Happy Hairston (24)	33–22			
56	February 6	@ San Diego	115–108	Jerry West (32)	34–22			
57	February 7	San Francisco	104–119	Jerry West (37)	35–22			
58	February 9	@ Cleveland	116–111	Gail Goodrich (42)	36–22			
59	February 11	@ Milwaukee	88–122	Wilt Chamberlain (25)	36–23			
60	February 12	@ Chicago	88–107	Gail Goodrich (21)	36–24			
61	February 14	Cincinnati	113–125	Jerry West (22)	37–24			
62	February 16	New York	115–130	Jerry West (31)	38–24			
63	February 18	@ Portland	136–114	Gail Goodrich (28)	39–24			
64	February 19	Philadelphia	118–104	Jerry West (25)	39–25			
65	February 21	Boston	116–124	Jerry West (34)	40–25			
66	February 23	@ Baltimore	114–107	Gail Goodrich (29)	41–25			
67	February 24	@ Boston	96–116	Wilt Chamberlain (27)	41–26			
68	February 26	Seattle	121–145	Wilt Chamberlain (30)	42–26			
69	February 27	@ San Francisco	112–107	Jerry West (42)	43–26			
70	February 28	Cleveland	90–107	Jerry West (24)	44–26			

March : 0–0 (home: 0–0; road: 0–0)

Game	Date	Team	Score	High points	High rebounds	High assists	Location Attendance	Record
71	March 2	@ Buffalo	131–118	Gail Goodrich (31)	45–26			
72	March 3	@ Milwaukee	97–112	Gail Goodrich (25)	45–27			
73	March 5	Atlanta	105–104	Wilt Chamberlain (22)	45–28			
74	March 6	@ Seattle	109–121	Willie McCarter (26)	45–29			
75	March 7	Chicago	108–117	Gail Goodrich (23)	46–29			
76	March 9	Baltimore	107–95	Wilt Chamberlain (28)	46–30			
77	March 12	Buffalo	116–109	Jim McMillian (21)	46–31			
78	March 14	Detroit	100–110	Keith Erickson (23)	47–31			
79	March 16	@ New York	82–115	Willie McCarter (19)	47–32			
80	March 17	@ Boston	104–112	Wilt Chamberlain (25)	47–33			
81	March 19	Phoenix	111–106	Wilt Chamberlain (28)	47–34			
82	March 21	New York	98–101	Gail Goodrich (29)	48–34			

1970–71 schedule

== Playoffs ==
1971 playoff game log
Conference Semi-finals: 4–3 (home: 4–0; road: 0–3)

Game	Date	Team	Score	High points	High rebounds	High assists	Location Attendance	Series
1	March 24	Chicago	W 100–99	Jim McMillian (26)	Wilt Chamberlain (21)	Gail Goodrich (11)	The Forum; 10,726	1–0
2	March 26	Chicago	W 105–95	Gail Goodrich (29)	Wilt Chamberlain (20)	Gail Goodrich (7)	The Forum; 13,469	2–0
3	March 28	@ Chicago	L 98–106	Gail Goodrich (39)	Wilt Chamberlain (18)	Goodrich, Chamberlain (6)	Chicago Stadium; 10,101	2–1
4	March 30	@ Chicago	L 102–112	Gail Goodrich (32)	Wilt Chamberlain (23)	Wilt Chamberlain (7)	Chicago Stadium; 18,650	2–2
5	April 1	Chicago	W 115–89	Gail Goodrich (33)	Wilt Chamberlain (14)	Gail Goodrich (11)	The Forum; 13,935	3–2
6	April 4	@ Chicago	L 99–113	Gail Goodrich (25)	Wilt Chamberlain (33)	Wilt Chamberlain (9)	Chicago Stadium; 14,211	3–3
7	April 6	Chicago	W 109–98	Gail Goodrich (29)	Wilt Chamberlain (19)	Goodrich, Chamberlain (9)	The Forum; 17,505	4–3

Conference finals: 1–4 (home: 1–1; road: 0–3)

Game	Date	Team	Score	High points	High rebounds	High assists	Location Attendance	Series
1	April 9	@ Milwaukee	L 85–106	Wilt Chamberlain (22)	Wilt Chamberlain (20)	Gail Goodrich (7)	Milwaukee Arena; 10,746	0–1
2	April 11	@ Milwaukee	L 73–91	Wilt Chamberlain (26)	Wilt Chamberlain (22)	Gail Goodrich (4)	Milwaukee Arena; 10,746	0–2
3	April 14	Milwaukee	W 118–107	four players tied (24)	Wilt Chamberlain (24)	Gail Goodrich (8)	The Forum; 17,334	1–2
4	April 16	Milwaukee	L 94–117	Gail Goodrich (26)	Wilt Chamberlain (16)	Gail Goodrich (11)	The Forum; 17,505	1–3
5	April 18	@ Milwaukee	L 98–116	Happy Hairston (27)	Wilt Chamberlain (12)	Gail Goodrich (9)	Milwaukee Arena; 10,746	1–4

1971 schedule

== Awards and records ==
- Jerry West, All-NBA First Team
- Jerry West, NBA All-Defensive First Team
- Jerry West, NBA All-Star Game
- Wilt Chamberlain, NBA All-Star Game

== Transactions ==
=== Free agents ===
Player	Signed	Former team
Fred Hetzel	August 28, 1970	Portland Trail Blazers

Subtractions
Player	Date signed	New team
Johnny Egan	Expansion Draft May 11, 1970	Cleveland Cavaliers
Dick Garrett	Expansion Draft May 11, 1970	Buffalo Braves
Mike Lynn	Expansion Draft May 11, 1970	Buffalo Braves
