= Harvey Marlatt =

American basketball player (1948–2024)

Personal information
- Born: August 26, 1948 Alpena County, Michigan, U.S.
- Died: August 8, 2024 (aged 75) Atlanta, Michigan, U.S.
- Listed height: 6 ft 3 in (1.91 m)
- Listed weight: 185 lb (84 kg)

Career information
- High school: Alpena (Alpena, Michigan)
- College: Eastern Michigan (1966–1970)
- NBA draft: 1970: 16th round, 224th overall pick
- Drafted by: Detroit Pistons
- Playing career: 1970–1972
- Position: Shooting guard
- Number: 26

Career history
- 1970–1972: Detroit Pistons
- Stats at NBA.com
- Stats at Basketball Reference

Harvey Wilson Marlatt (August 26, 1948 – August 8, 2024) was an American professional basketball player for the Detroit Pistons from 1970 to 1972. He played in 61 games as a Piston and scored 225 points. Before joining the Pistons, he played basketball for Eastern Michigan University. Marlatt ranks fifth on the all time EMU scoring list with 1680 points scored. He was inducted into the EMU Sports Hall of Fame in 1979.

Marlatt is the lowest drafted player (in terms of selection number) to have ever played in the NBA.

Marlatt died in Atlanta, Michigan on August 8, 2024, at the age of 75.

== Career statistics ==
Legend
GP	Games played	GS	Games started	MPG	Minutes per game
FG%	Field goal percentage	3P%	3-point field goal percentage	FT%	Free throw percentage
RPG	Rebounds per game	APG	Assists per game	SPG	Steals per game
BPG	Blocks per game	PPG	Points per game	**Bold**	Career high

=== NBA ===
==== Regular season ====
Year	Team	GP	MPG	FG%	FT%	RPG	APG	PPG
1970–71	Detroit	23	9.3	.313	.833	1.0	1.3	2.8
1971–72	Detroit	**31**	**16.3**	.403	**.857**	**2.0**	**1.9**	**5.0**
1972–73	Detroit	7	3.7	**.500**	–	.1	.6	.6
Career		61	12.2	.373	.850	1.4	1.5	3.7
