= 1970–71 Chicago Bulls season =

NBA professional basketball team season

- Head coach: Dick Motta
- General manager: Pat Williams
- Owner: Dick Klein
- Arena: Chicago Stadium

Results
- Record: 51–31 (.622)
- Place: Division: 2nd (Midwest); Conference: 3rd (Western)
- Playoff finish: Conference semifinals (lost to Lakers 3–4)
- Stats at Basketball Reference

Local media
- Television: WGN-TV (Jack Brickhouse, Vince Lloyd)
- Radio: WIND (Jack Fleming, Bill Berg)

The 1970–71 Chicago Bulls season was the Bulls' fifth season in the NBA.

== Offseason ==
=== Draft picks ===
Round	Pick	Player	Position	Nationality	School/Club team
1	11	Jimmy Collins	SG	United States	New Mexico State
2	28	Paul Ruffner	C	United States	BYU
3	45	Lou Herndon	G	United States	Jackson State
4	57	John Davis	F	United States	Alabama State

== Roster ==
1970–71 Chicago Bulls roster
Players

Pos.	No.	Player	Height	Weight	DOB	From
F	14	Johnny Baum	6 ft 5 in (1.96 m)	200 lb (91 kg)	1946–06–17	Temple
C	18	Tom Boerwinkle	7 ft 0 in (2.13 m)	265 lb (120 kg)	1945–08–23	Tennessee
G	22	Jimmy Collins	6 ft 2 in (1.88 m)	175 lb (79 kg)	1946–11–24	New Mexico State
C	31	Jim Fox	6 ft 10 in (2.08 m)	230 lb (104 kg)	1943–04–07	South Carolina
G	24	Matt Guokas	6 ft 6 in (1.98 m)	195 lb (88 kg)	1944–03–25	Saint Joseph's
G	21	Jim King	6 ft 2 in (1.88 m)	175 lb (79 kg)	1941–02–07	Tulsa
F	10	Bob Love	6 ft 8 in (2.03 m)	215 lb (98 kg)	1942–12–08	Southern
C	44	Paul Ruffner	6 ft 11 in (2.11 m)	225 lb (102 kg)	1948–10–15	BYU
G	4	Jerry Sloan	6 ft 5 in (1.96 m)	195 lb (88 kg)	1942–03–28	Evansville
F	25	Chet Walker	6 ft 6 in (1.98 m)	212 lb (96 kg)	1940–02–22	Bradley
G	8	Bob Weiss	6 ft 2 in (1.88 m)	180 lb (82 kg)	1942–05–07	Penn State

Coaches
Head coach
- Dick Motta

Legend
- (DP) Unsigned draft pick
- (FA) Free agent
- (S) Suspended
- Injured

Roster
Updated: January 26, 1971

== Regular season ==
=== Season standings ===
Midwest Division	W	L	PCT	GB	Home	Road	Neutral	Div
y-Milwaukee Bucks	66	16	.805	–	34–2	28–13	4–1	14–4
x-Chicago Bulls	51	31	.622	15	30–11	17–19	4–1	7–11
Phoenix Suns	48	34	.585	18	27–14	19–20	2–0	9–9
Detroit Pistons	45	37	.549	21	24–17	20–19	1–1	6–12

#	Western Conference			
#	Team	W	L	PCT
1	z-Milwaukee Bucks	66	16	.805
2	y-Los Angeles Lakers	48	34	.585
3	x-Chicago Bulls	51	31	.622
4	x-San Francisco Warriors	41	41	.500
5	Phoenix Suns	48	34	.585
6	Detroit Pistons	45	37	.549
7	San Diego Rockets	40	42	.488
8	Seattle SuperSonics	38	44	.463
9	Portland Trail Blazers	29	53	.354

z – clinched division title
y – clinched division title
x – clinched playoff spot

=== Game log ===
1970–71 game log
Total: 51–31 (home: 30–11; road: 17–19)
October: 5–3 (home: 1–1; road: 4–2)

Game	Date	Team	Score	High points	High rebounds	High assists	Location Attendance	Record
1	October 13, 1970	San Diego	W 111–96	Bob Love (28)	Chet Walker (15)	Bob Weiss (11)	Chicago Stadium	1–0
2	October 14, 1970	@ Philadelphia	L 107–110	Chet Walker (30)	Chet Walker (11)	Bob Weiss (9)	The Spectrum	1–1
3	October 16, 1970	Los Angeles	L 102–106	Bob Weiss (22)	Jerry Sloan (13)	Jerry Sloan (6)	Chicago Stadium	1–2
4	October 17, 1970	@ New York	W 99–96	Chet Walker (24)	Tom Boerwinkle (22)	Bob Weiss (11)	Madison Square Garden	2–2

November : 0–0 (home: 0–0; road: 0–0)

Game	Date	Team	Score	High points	High rebounds	High assists	Location Attendance	Record

December : 0–0 (home: 0–0; road: 0–0)

Game	Date	Team	Score	High points	High rebounds	High assists	Location Attendance	Record

January : 0–0 (home: 0–0; road: 0–0)

Game	Date	Team	Score	High points	High rebounds	High assists	Location Attendance	Record

February : 0–0 (home: 0–0; road: 0–0)

Game	Date	Team	Score	High points	High rebounds	High assists	Location Attendance	Record

March : 0–0 (home: 0–0; road: 0–0)

Game	Date	Team	Score	High points	High rebounds	High assists	Location Attendance	Record

1970–71 schedule

== Playoffs ==
1971 playoff game log
Conference semifinals: 3–4 (home: 3–0; road: 0–4)

Game	Date	Team	Score	High points	High rebounds	High assists	Location Attendance	Series
1	March 24	@ Los Angeles	L 99–100	Bob Love (24)	Sloan, Boerwinkle (9)	Tom Boerwinkle (8)	The Forum; 10,726	0–1
2	March 26	@ Los Angeles	L 95–105	Bob Love (34)	Jim Fox (13)	Bob Weiss (5)	The Forum; 13,469	0–2
3	March 28	Los Angeles	W 106–98	Bob Love (27)	Chet Walker (12)	Bob Weiss (11)	Chicago Stadium; 10,101	1–2
4	March 30	Los Angeles	W 112–102	Bob Love (36)	Jerry Sloan (12)	Bob Weiss (13)	Chicago Stadium; 18,650	2–2
5	April 1	@ Los Angeles	L 89–115	Bob Love (21)	Jim Fox (11)	Weiss, King (7)	The Forum; 13,935	2–3
6	April 4	Los Angeles	W 113–99	Bob Weiss (25)	Tom Boerwinkle (18)	Boerwinkle, Walker (6)	Chicago Stadium; 14,211	3–3
7	April 6	@ Los Angeles	L 98–109	Sloan, Love (24)	Jim Fox (12)	Bob Weiss (8)	The Forum; 17,505	3–4

1971 schedule

== Player statistics ==
Legend
GP	Games played	GS	Games started	MPG	Minutes per game
FG%	Field-goal percentage	3P%	3-point field-goal percentage	FT%	Free-throw percentage
RPG	Rebounds per game	APG	Assists per game	SPG	Steals per game
BPG	Blocks per game	PPG	Points per game

=== Regular season ===
Player	GP	GS	MPG	FG%	3P%	FT%	RPG	APG	SPG	BPG	PPG
Johnny Baum											
Tom Boerwinkle											
Jimmy Collins											
Jim Fox											
Matt Guokas											
Shaler Halimon											
A. W. Holt											
Jim King											
Bob Love											
Paul Ruffner											
Jerry Sloan											
Chet Walker											
Bob Weiss											

=== Playoffs ===
Player	GP	GS	MPG	FG%	3P%	FT%	RPG	APG	SPG	BPG	PPG
Johnny Baum											
Tom Boerwinkle											
Jimmy Collins											
Jim Fox											
Matt Guokas											
Jim King											
Bob Love											
Paul Ruffner											
Jerry Sloan											
Chet Walker											
Bob Weiss											

== Awards and records ==
- Dick Motta, NBA Coach of the Year Award
- Bob Love, All-NBA Second Team
- Jerry Sloan, NBA All-Defensive Second Team
- Chet Walker, NBA All-Star Game
- Bob Love, NBA All-Star Game

== Transactions ==
=== Free agents ===
Subtractions
Player	Date signed	New team
Ed Manning	Expansion Draft May 11, 1970	Portland Trail Blazers
Loy Petersen	Expansion Draft May 11, 1970	Cleveland Cavaliers
Walt Wesley	Expansion Draft May 11, 1970	Cleveland Cavaliers
