= 1971–72 Indiana Pacers season =

ABA basketball team season (won ABA championship)

- ABA champions
- Head coach: Bobby Leonard
- Arena: Indiana State Fairgrounds Coliseum

Results
- Record: 47–37 (.560)
- Place: Division: 2nd (Western)
- Playoff finish: ABA Champions (Defeated Nets 4–2)
- Stats at Basketball Reference

The 1971–72 Indiana Pacers season was the fifth season of the franchise while out in the American Basketball Association. The Pacers would end their season with a worse record when compared to their previous season with an eleven-game decrease in wins. However, Indiana still finished the season with a second-place finish in the Western Division (behind only the defending champion Utah Stars) before winning their second ABA title in three years. In the division semifinals, the Pacers required all seven games played in order to eliminate the Denver Rockets, who finished their season with a 34–50 record. Then, in the Western Division Finals, the Utah Stars were eliminated in seven games, getting revenge on the Stars for the division finals loss they had to them last season. Finally, the New York Nets appeared in the ABA Finals championship series for the first time in franchise history, thought the Nets were defeated by the Pacers in six games in the only series the Pacers didn't take to seven games this season. This would lead to the Pacers winning their second championship in three years, as well as their third ABA Finals appearance in four years after missing out on playing in the 1971 ABA Finals.

== Offseason ==
=== ABA Draft ===
This draft was the first ABA draft to have a properly recorded historical note of every round in their draft available.

Round	Pick	Player	Position(s)	Nationality	College
2	18	Darnell Hillman	PF/C	United States	San Jose State
3	24	John Mengelt	SG	United States	Auburn
4	42	Jim Cleamons	PG/SG	United States	Ohio State
5	53	Clarence Glover	SF	United States	Western Kentucky
6	64	Jeff Halliburton	SG	United States	Drake
7	75	Dean Meminger	PG	United States	Marquette
8	86	Vic Bartolome	G	United States	UCLA
9	97	Tom Crosswhite	F	United States	Dayton
10	108	Larry Weatherford	G	United States	Purdue
11	119	Jim England	G	United States	Tennessee
12	129	Jeff Smith	F	United States	New Mexico State
13	138	Rick Katherman	F	United States	Duke
14	147	Clarence Smith	F	United States	Villanova
15	156	Rich Walker	G	United States	Bowling Green State
16	164	Tom Bush	C	United States	Drake
17	172	Jim Irving	G	United States	Saint Louis
18	179	Bob Bissant	G	United States	Loyola University (New Orleans)
19	185	Rudy Benjamin	G	United States	Michigan State
20	190	Slick Pinkham	PG	United States	DePauw

This draft was notable for Indiana due to the Pacers using the final selection that was done in this draft to select a gag name portmanteau player from DePauw University named "Slick Pinkham", who was actually a made-up individual that was a combination of head coach Bobby "Slick" Leonard and Dick Tinkham (the latter of whom actually attended DePauw University and even played basketball for them) to essentially prank the entire American Basketball Association for that specific draft. Their draft period was also notable for them acquiring power forward George McGinnis, a junior from Indiana University as an undrafted prospect; McGinnis would prove to be a key player for the Pacers during the early 1970s while in the ABA, to the point of being one of four Pacers players to have his number retired with the team as of 2025 (and one of three Pacers players to have their number retired while playing in the ABA alongside former Minnesota Muskies draft pick Mel Daniels and Roger Brown, who had previously been banned from the NBA due to perceived involvement in the 1961 NCAA University Division men's basketball gambling scandal).

== Roster ==
1971–72 Indiana Pacers roster
Players

Pos.	No.	Player	Height	Weight	DOB	From
SG	15	John Barnhill	6 ft 1 in (1.85 m)	180 lb (82 kg)	March 20, 1938	Tennessee State
SF	35	Roger Brown	6 ft 5 in (1.96 m)	205 lb (93 kg)	May 22, 1942	Dayton
SG	33	Larry Cannon	6 ft 4 in (1.93 m)	195 lb (88 kg)	April 12, 1947	La Salle
SF	22	Wayne Chapman	6 ft 6 in (1.98 m)	190 lb (86 kg)	June 15, 1945	Western Kentucky
C	34	Mel Daniels	6 ft 9 in (2.06 m)	220 lb (100 kg)	July 20, 1944	New Mexico
PF	20	Darnell Hillman	6 ft 9 in (2.06 m)	215 lb (98 kg)	August 29, 1949	San José State
SG	11	Billy Keller	5 ft 10 in (1.78 m)	177 lb (80 kg)	August 30, 1947	Purdue
G	15	Arvesta Kelly	6 ft 2 in (1.88 m)	175 lb (79 kg)	November 20, 1945	Lincoln (MO)
PG	14	Freddie Lewis	6 ft 0 in (1.83 m)	175 lb (79 kg)	July 1, 1943	Arizona State
PF	30	George McGinnis	6 ft 8 in (2.03 m)	235 lb (107 kg)	August 12, 1950	Indiana
SG	10	Rick Mount	6 ft 3 in (1.91 m)	175 lb (79 kg)	January 5, 1947	Purdue
PF	24	Bob Netolicky	6 ft 9 in (2.06 m)	220 lb (100 kg)	August 2, 1942	Drake
G	15	Mike Price	6 ft 3 in (1.91 m)	200 lb (91 kg)	September 11, 1948	Illinois
PF	33	Don Sidle	6 ft 8 in (2.03 m)	215 lb (98 kg)	June 21, 1946	Oklahoma
G	12	Marv Winkler	6 ft 1 in (1.85 m)	164 lb (74 kg)	February 18, 1948	Louisiana

Coaches
Head coach
- Bobby Leonard

Legend
- (DP) Unsigned draft pick
- (FA) Free agent
- (S) Suspended
- Injured

Roster

== Regular season ==
=== ABA Schedule ===
Game	Date	Opponent	Result	Pacers points	Opponents	Record
1						
2						

=== Season standings ===
1971–72 ABA Western Standings
Western Division	W	L	PCT.	GB
Utah Stars	60	24	.714	–
Indiana Pacers	47	37	.560	13
Dallas Chaparrals	42	42	.500	18
Denver Rockets	34	50	.405	26
Memphis Pros	26	58	.310	34

== Player stats ==
Legend
GP	Games played	GS	Games started	MPG	Minutes per game
FG%	Field-goal percentage	3P%	3-point field-goal percentage	FT%	Free-throw percentage
RPG	Rebounds per game	APG	Assists per game	SPG	Steals per game
BPG	Blocks per game	PPG	Points per game

=== Regular season ===
Player	GP	MPG	FG%	3P%	FT%	TRB	APG	PPG
Roger Brown	78	38.3	.478	.308	.805	6.4	3.9	18.5
Mel Daniels	79	37.6	.505	.000	.703	16.4	2.2	19.2
Freddie Lewis	77	35.2	.428	.310	.861	4.2	4.7	15.4
Bob Netolicky	83	35.0	.479	.211	.724	9.2	1.0	15.1
George McGinnis	73	29.8	.465	.158	.645	9.7	1.9	16.9
Rick Mount	78	27.3	.443	.317	.828	2.0	2.9	14.3
Billy Keller	76	22.8	.426	.331	.879	2.2	3.5	9.7
Darnell Hillman	73	19.0	.488	.200	.644	6.5	0.7	7.1
Larry Cannon	28	17.1	.383	.167	.718	1.2	2.6	6.6
Don Sidle	27	14.6	.503	.000	.633	3.5	0.4	6.5
Wayne Chapman	7	10.9	.389	.500	.500	0.7	1.6	2.6
Arvesta Kelly	4	10.3	.333			1.8	0.5	1.5
John Barnhill	19	10.2	.322	.114	.533	1.0	0.8	3.6
Marv Winkler	20	7.8	278	.500	.571	0.8	0.6	2.0
Mike Price	4	6.3	.333			1.3	0.3	1.5

== ABA Playoffs ==
ABA Western Division Semifinals vs. Denver Rockets

Game	Date	Location	Score	Record	Attendance
1	March 31	Indiana	102–95	1–0	6,103
2	April 1	Indiana	105–106	1–1	6,521
3	April 4	Denver	122–120	2–1	5,304
4	April 6	Denver	96–112	2–2	6,109
5	April 8	Indiana	91–79	3–2	9,428
6	April 9	Denver	99–106	3–3	5,815
7	April 13	Indiana	91–89	4–3	8,643

Pacers won series, 4–3

ABA Western Division Finals vs. Utah Stars

Game	Date	Location	Score	Record	Attendance
1	April 15	Utah	100–108	0–1	9,854
2	April 17	Utah	109–117	0–2	11,780
3	April 19	Indiana	116–111	1–2	7,489
4	April 22	Indiana	118–108	2–2	13,007
5	April 24	Utah	130–139	2–3	12,526
6	April 26	Indiana	105–99	3–3	8,103
7	May 1	Utah	117–113	4–3	12,724

Pacers won series, 4–3

ABA Finals vs. New York Nets

Game	Date	Location	Score	Record	Attendance
1	May 6	Indiana	124–103	1–0	7,483
2	May 9	Indiana	115–117	1–1	10,079
3	May 12	New York	114–108	2–1	15,241
4	May 15	New York	105–110	2–2	15,890
5	May 18	Indiana	100–99	3–2	10,079
6	May 20	New York	108–105	4–2	10,434

Pacers won series, 4–2

== Awards, records, and honors ==
- Roger Brown appeared in the 1972 ABA All-Star Game
- Mel Daniels appeared in the 1972 ABA All-Star Game
- Freddie Lewis appeared in the 1972 ABA All-Star Game
