= 1970–71 Milwaukee Bucks season =

Professional basketball team season (won NBA championship)

- NBA champions
- Conference champions
- Division champions
- Head coach: Larry Costello
- Arena: Milwaukee Arena

Results
- Record: 66–16 (.805)
- Place: Division: 1st (Midwest); Conference: 1st (Western)
- Playoff finish: NBA champions (Defeated Bullets 4–0)
- Stats at Basketball Reference

Local media
- Television: WISN-TV
- Radio: WTMJ

The 1970–71 Milwaukee Bucks season was the third season for the Bucks. Milwaukee posted a 66–16 record in only its third year of existence, and its second since drafting Lew Alcindor (later known as Kareem Abdul-Jabbar). A key part of this championship season was the acquisition of Oscar Robertson. Other role players on the Bucks included players such as Bob Dandridge (18.4 ppg), Jon McGlocklin (15.8 ppg), power forward Greg Smith & key reserves such as Lucius Allen, Bob Boozer and Dick Cunningham completing the nucleus. This season included a 20-game winning streak, the NBA's longest at the time, and still ranked fifth all-time. The Bucks became the first team from the Midwest Division to win the NBA title; it would be 23 years before the Houston Rockets would do the same.

In the 1971 NBA Playoffs, the Bucks defeated the 4th-seeded Warriors in 5 games. In the Western Conference Finals, the team dispatched the Lakers in 5 games. The Bucks made their way into the Finals for the first time in NBA history in just their third year of existence. They faced off against the Baltimore Bullets and swept them in four games. The Bucks had won their first title in franchise history. Lew Alcindor won MVP and Finals MVP honors. HoopsHype would later rank this squad as the team with the sixth-easiest path to an NBA Finals championship due to the records that the San Francisco Warriors and Baltimore Bullets had this season.

This would be the last NBA championship for the Bucks until the 2020–21 season. The Bucks tied with the Miami Heat for the best regular season record since the 2012-13 season.

== Draft picks ==
The Milwaukee Bucks made ten selections in the 1970 NBA draft.

Round	Pick	Player	College/Club team
1	16	Gary Freeman	Oregon State
2	33	Bill Zopf	Duquesne
3	50	Marv Winkler	SW Louisiana
4	67	Virgle Fredricks	Drury
5	84	Mike Grosso	Louisville
6	101	Willy Watson	Oklahoma City
7	118	John Rinka	Kenyon
8	135	Jim Samo	Northwestern
9	152	Joe Hamilton	North Texas State
10	169	Bob Seemer	Georgia Tech

== Roster ==
1970–71 Milwaukee Bucks roster
Players

Pos.	No.	Player	Height	Weight	DOB	From
C	33	Lew Alcindor	7 ft 2 in (2.18 m)	225 lb (102 kg)	1947–04–16	UCLA
PG	7	Lucius Allen	6 ft 2 in (1.88 m)	175 lb (79 kg)	1947–09–26	UCLA
PF	20	Bob Boozer	6 ft 8 in (2.03 m)	215 lb (98 kg)	1937–04–26	Kansas State
C	19	Dick Cunningham	6 ft 10 in (2.08 m)	245 lb (111 kg)	1946–07–11	Murray State
SF	10	Bob Dandridge	6 ft 6 in (1.98 m)	195 lb (88 kg)	1947–11–15	Norfolk State
F	18	Bob Greacen	6 ft 7 in (2.01 m)	206 lb (93 kg)	1947–09–15	Rutgers
G	14	Jon McGlocklin	6 ft 5 in (1.96 m)	205 lb (93 kg)	1943–06–10	Indiana
SF	35	McCoy McLemore	6 ft 7 in (2.01 m)	230 lb (104 kg)	1942–04–03	Drake
PG	1	Oscar Robertson	6 ft 5 in (1.96 m)	205 lb (93 kg)	1938–11–24	Cincinnati
F	4	Greg Smith	6 ft 5 in (1.96 m)	195 lb (88 kg)	1947–01–28	Western Kentucky
PG	8	Jeff Webb	6 ft 4 in (1.93 m)	170 lb (77 kg)	1948–07–06	Kansas State
G	5	Marv Winkler	6 ft 1 in (1.85 m)	170 lb (77 kg)	1948–02–18	Louisiana
G	6	Bill Zopf	6 ft 1 in (1.85 m)	170 lb (77 kg)	1948–06–07	Duquesne

Coaches
Head coach
- Larry Costello
Assistant(s)
- Tom Nissalke

Legend
- (DP) Unsigned draft pick
- (FA) Free agent
- (S) Suspended
- Injured

== Regular season ==
In only his second professional season, Lew Alcindor led the league in scoring at 31.7 ppg, ranked second in field goal percentage at .577 and fourth in rebounding at 16.0 rpg. Newly arrived Oscar Robertson turned 32 early in the 1970–71 season, and was past his prime when he came to Milwaukee, but his versatile skills and experience provided a leadership role for the Bucks. Robertson had never won a championship and his desire to win seemed to inspire Alcindor and unite the rest of the Bucks. Robertson ranked third in the league in assists at 8.3 apg and was the Bucks' No. 2 scorer at 19.4 ppg.

=== Standings ===
Midwest Division	W	L	PCT	GB	Home	Road	Neutral	Div
y-Milwaukee Bucks	66	16	.805	–	34–2	28–13	4–1	14–4
x-Chicago Bulls	51	31	.622	15	30–11	17–19	4–1	7–11
Phoenix Suns	48	34	.585	18	27–14	19–20	2–0	9–9
Detroit Pistons	45	37	.549	21	24–17	20–19	1–1	6–12

#	Western Conference			
#	Team	W	L	PCT
1	z-Milwaukee Bucks	66	16	.805
2	y-Los Angeles Lakers	48	34	.585
3	x-Chicago Bulls	51	31	.622
4	x-San Francisco Warriors	41	41	.500
5	Phoenix Suns	48	34	.585
6	Detroit Pistons	45	37	.549
7	San Diego Rockets	40	42	.488
8	Seattle SuperSonics	38	44	.463
9	Portland Trail Blazers	29	53	.354

=== Record vs. opponents ===
==== vs. Eastern Conference ====
vs. Atlantic Division

1970–71 NBA records
Team	BOS	BUF	NYK	PHI	Total
Chicago	0–0	0–0	0–0	0–0	0–0
Detroit	0–0	0–0	0–0	0–0	0–0
Milwaukee	5–0	4–0	1–4	4–1	14–5
Phoenix	0–0	0–0	0–0	0–0	0–0

vs. Central Division

1970–71 NBA records
Team	ATL	BAL	CIN	CLE	Total
Chicago	0–0	0–0	0–0	0–0	0–0
Detroit	0–0	0–0	0–0	0–0	0–0
Milwaukee	4–1	4–1	4–1	4–0	16–3
Phoenix	0–0	0–0	0–0	0–0	0–0

==== vs. Western Conference ====
vs. Midwest Division

1970–71 NBA records
Team	CHI	DET	MIL	PHO	Total
Chicago	—	0–0	1–5	0–0	1–5
Detroit	0–0	—	1–5	0–0	1–5
Milwaukee	5–1	5–1	—	4–2	14–4
Phoenix	0–0	0–0	2–4	—	2–4

vs. Pacific Division

1970–71 NBA records
Team	LAL	POR	SDR	SFW	SEA	Total
Chicago	0–0	0–0	0–0	0–0	0–0	0–0
Detroit	0–0	0–0	0–0	0–0	0–0	0–0
Milwaukee	4–1	3–1	4–1	6–0	5–1	22–4
Phoenix	0–0	0–0	0–0	0–0	0–0	0–0

== Game log ==
=== Regular season ===
1970–71 game log
Total: 66–16 (Home: 34–2; Road: 28–14)
October: 5–1 (home: 3–0; road: 2–1)

Game	Date	Team	Score	High points	High rebounds	High assists	Location Attendance	Record
1	October 17; 12:25 p.m. CDT	@ Atlanta	W 107–98	Lew Alcindor (Note: Changed his name to Kareem Abdul-Jabbar before the 1971–72 season.) (32)	Lew Alcindor (17)	Oscar Robertson (4)	Alexander Memorial Coliseum; 7,197	1–0
2	October 20; 7:05 p.m. CDT	@ Detroit	L 114–115	Lew Alcindor (38)	Lew Alcindor (16)	Oscar Robertson (11)	Cobo Center; 11,316	1–1
3	October 24; 8:00 p.m. CDT	Baltimore	W 122–120 (2OT)	Lew Alcindor (39)	Lew Alcindor (17)	Oscar Robertson (8)	Milwaukee Arena; 10,746	2–1
4	October 25; 8:00 p.m. CST	Seattle	W 126–107	Lew Alcindor (37)	Lew Alcindor (14)	Oscar Robertson (13)	Milwaukee Arena; 9,340	3–1
5	October 27; 8:00 p.m. CST	San Diego	W 126–113	Bob Dandridge (39)	Alcindor, Cunningham (10)	Oscar Robertson (8)	Milwaukee Arena; 9,565	4–1
6	October 31; 7:05 p.m. CST	@ Cincinnati	W 121–100	Lew Alcindor (28)	Lew Alcindor (22)	Bob Dandridge (9)	Cincinnati Gardens; 9,634	5–1

November: 13–2 (home: 5–1; road: 8–1)

Game	Date	Team	Score	High points	High rebounds	High assists	Location Attendance	Record
7	November 4; 7:00 p.m. CST	@ Cleveland	W 110–108	Lew Alcindor (53)	Lew Alcindor (11)	Dandridge, McGlocklin (9)	Cleveland Arena; 3,575	6–1
8	November 8; 8:00 p.m. CST	Phoenix	W 125–105	Bob Dandridge (32)	Bob Dandridge (14)	McGlocklin, Robertspn (9)	Milwaukee Arena; 10,746	7–1
9	November 11; 7:00 p.m. CST	@ Boston	W 123–113	Lew Alcindor (44)	Lew Alcindor (15)	Oscar Robertson (10)	Boston Garden; 15,203	8–1
10	November 14; 7:00 p.m. CST	@ Buffalo	W 116–107	Lew Alcindor (27)	Lew Alcindor (20)	Lew Alcindor (7)	Buffalo Memorial Auditorium; 10,248	9–1
11	November 15; 8:00 p.m. CST	Baltimore	W 105–90	Alcindor, Robertson (27)	Lew Alcindor (21)	Oscar Robertson (12)	Milwaukee Arena; 10,746	10–1
12	November 16; 8:00 p.m. CST	San Francisco	W 119–100	Lew Alcindor (30)	Bob Dandridge (14)	Oscar Robertson (10)	Milwaukee Arena; 10,247	11–1
13	November 18; 10:00 p.m. CST	@ San Diego	W 117–111	Lew Alcindor (25)	Lew Alcindor (16)	Oscar Robertson (6)	San Diego Sports Arena; 8,958	12–1
14	November 20; 10:00 p.m. CST	@ Los Angeles	W 117–100	Lew Alcindor (29)	Lew Alcindor (13)	Lucius Allen (5)	The Forum; 17,509	13–1
15	November 21; 10:00 p.m. CST	@ San Francisco	W 127–102	Lew Alcindor (28)	Lew Alcindor (15)	Oscar Robertson (9)	Cow Palace; 8,204	14–1
16	November 22; 9:00 p.m. CST	@ Portland	W 126–104	Lew Alcindor (30)	Lew Alcindor (26)	Oscar Robertson (9)	Memorial Coliseum; 9,471	15–1
17	November 24; 7:30 p.m. CST	@ Chicago	W 117–108	Lew Alcindor (37)	Lew Alcindor (15)	Oscar Robertson (12)	Chicago Stadium; 11,331	16–1
18	November 25; 8:00 p.m. CST	Detroit	W 113–87	Lew Alcindor (31)	Alcindor & Smith (17)	Oscar Robertson (9)	Milwaukee Arena; 10,746	17–1
19	November 27; 8:00 p.m. CST	New York	L 94–103	Lew Alcindor (33)	Lew Alcindor (16)	Oscar Robertson (7)	Milwaukee Arena; 10,746	17–2
20	November 28; 7:00 p.m. CST	@ New York	L 99–100	Lew Alcindor (35)	Lew Alcindor (24)	Oscar Robertson (5)	Madison Square Garden; 19,500	17–3
21	November 29; 8:00 p.m. CST	Portland	W 124-111	Lew Alcindor (33)	Greg Smith (14)	Oscar Robertson (13)	Milwaukee Arena; 9,849	18–3

December: 10–4 (home: 7–0; road: 3–4)

Game	Date	Team	Score	High points	High rebounds	High assists	Location Attendance	Record
22	December 3; 8:00 p.m. CST	Chicago	W 107–100	Alcindor, Robertson (22)	Lew Alcindor (10)	Lew Alcindor (7)	Milwaukee Arena; 9,759	19–3
23	December 4; 8:00 p.m. CST	Philadelphia	W 128–122 (OT)	Lew Alcindor (35)	Lew Alcindor (18)	Jon McGlocklin (9)	Milwaukee Arena; 10,746	20–3
24	December 8; 8:00 p.m. CST	Atlanta	W 125–104	Lew Alcindor (24)	Lew Alcindor (13)	Oscar Robertson (13)	Milwaukee Arena; 10,746	21–3
25	December 9; 7:00 p.m. CST	@ Baltimore	L 97–127	Lew Alcindor (24)	Lew Alcindor (15)	Lew Alcindor (4)	Baltimore Civic Center; 10,655	21–4
26	December 11; 8:00 p.m. CST	Cleveland	W 134–92	Lew Alcindor (34)	Lew Alcindor (17)	Oscar Robertson (13)	Milwaukee Arena; 9,449	22–4
27	December 12; 9:00 p.m. CST	@ Phoenix	L 111–113	Lew Alcindor (36)	Lew Alcindor (17)	Oscar Robertson (12)	Arizona Veterans Memorial Coliseum; 11,002	22–5
28	December 13; 9:00 p.m. CST	@ Seattle	W 124–107	Lew Alcindor (40)	Lew Alcindor (22)	Oscar Robertson (5)	Seattle Center Coliseum; 12,267	23–5
29	December 18; 8:00 p.m. CST	Boston	W 124–114	Lew Alcindor (40)	Lew Alcindor (15)	Greg Smith (10)	Milwaukee Arena; 10,746	24–5
30	December 19; 7:05 p.m. CST	@ Cincinnati	L 110–119	Lew Alcindor (35)	Lew Alcindor (20)	Jon McGlocklin (6)	Cincinnati Gardens; 5,071	24–6
31	December 20; 8:00 p.m. CST	Buffalo	W 131–101	Lew Alcindor (27)	Lew Alcindor (13)	Oscar Robertson (11)	Milwaukee Arena; 10,174	25–6
32	December 21; 8:00 p.m. CST	Los Angeles	W 113–88	Lew Alcindor (37)	Lew Alcindor (16)	Oscar Robertson (10)	Milwaukee Arena; 10,746	26–6
33	December 26; 8:00 p.m. CST	San Francisco	W 131–111	Lew Alcindor (34)	Lew Alcindor (15)	Oscar Robertson (7)	Milwaukee Arena; 10,746	27–6
34	December 28; 8:00 p.m. CST	@ Cincinnati (at Madison, WI)	W 137–114	Lew Alcindor (29)	Lew Alcindor (15)	Greg Smith (8)	Wisconsin Field House; 8,485	28–6
35	December 29; 7:00 p.m. CST	@ Cleveland	W 119–97	Alcindor, Dandridge (23)	Lew Alcindor (15)	Oscar Robertson (13)	Cleveland Arena; 7,682	29–6
36	December 30; 7:00 p.m. CST	@ Philadelphia	L 107–119	Lew Alcindor (30)	Lew Alcindor (18)	Oscar Robertson (8)	The Spectrum; 14,835	29–7

January: 13–2 (home: 6–1; road: 7–1)

Game	Date	Team	Score	High points	High rebounds	High assists	Location Attendance	Record
37	January 2; 8:00 p.m. CST	Cleveland	W 118–73	Lew Alcindor (27)	Bob Boozer (14)	Oscar Robertson (8)	Milwaukee Arena; 10,746	30–7
38	January 4; 8:00 p.m. CST	Seattle	W 124–110	Lew Alcindor (38)	Lew Alcindor (14)	Oscar Robertson (7)	Milwaukee Arena; 8,835	31–7
39	January 6; 8:00 p.m. CST	@ Chicago (at Madison, WI)	W 119–106	Lew Alcindor (24)	Alcindor, Boozer (9)	Oscar Robertson (10)	Wisconsin Field House; 6,093	32–7
40	January 7; 8:00 p.m. CST	New York	W 116–106	Oscar Robertson (35)	Lew Alcindor (13)	Oscar Robertson (13)	Milwaukee Arena; 10,746	33–7
41	January 9; 1:30 p.m. CST	Detroit	W 118–100	Lew Alcindor (27)	Lew Alcindor (14)	Lew Alcindor (10)	Milwaukee Arena; 10,746	34–7
42	January 10; 8:00 p.m. CST	Baltimore	W 151–99	Bob Dandridge (34)	Lew Alcindor (17)	Oscar Robertson (9)	Milwaukee Arena; 10,746	35–7
All-Star Break
43	January 15; 8:00 p.m. CST	Cincinnati	W 135–116	Lew Alcindor (35)	Lew Alcindor (16)	Alcindor, Robertson (5)	Milwaukee Arena; 10,746	36–7
44	January 16; 7:30 p.m. CST	@ Chicago	W 110–90	Lew Alcindor (25)	Lew Alcindor (19)	Alcindor, Robertson (8)	Chicago Stadium; 14,013	37–7
45	January 17; 7:30 p.m. CST	Boston	W 120–113	Lew Alcindor (44)	Lew Alcindor (20)	Tied (5)	Milwaukee Arena; 10,746	38–7
46	January 20; 7:00 p.m. CST	@ Baltimore	W 120–116	Lew Alcindor (39)	Lew Alcindor (20)	Bob Dandridge (5)	Baltimore Civic Center; 12,289	39–7
47	January 22; 8:00 p.m. CST	Atlanta	L 110–117	Bob Dandridge (22)	Lew Alcindor (20)	Oscar Robertson (8)	Milwaukee Arena; 10,746	39–8
48	January 23; 1:30 p.m. CST	Portland	W 142–117	Lew Alcindor (44)	Lew Alcindor (17)	Lew Alcindor (7)	Milwaukee Arena; 10,746	40–8
49	January 24; 1:00 p.m. CST	@ Atlanta	W 142–120	Bob Dandridge (33)	Lew Alcindor (17)	Oscar Robertson (15)	Alexander Memorial Coliseum; 7,192	41–8
50	January 26; 6:30 p.m. CST	@ New York	L 98–107	Lew Alcindor (29)	Lew Alcindor (25)	Lew Alcindor (4)	Madison Square Garden; 19,500	41–9
51	January 27; 7:00 p.m. CST	@ Boston	W 132–129	Lew Alcindor (53)	Lew Alcindor (14)	Alcindor, Robertson (7)	Boston Garden; 8,097	42–9
52	January 29; 7:00 p.m. CST	@ Philadelphia	W 142–118	Lew Alcindor (31)	Lew Alcindor (13)	Alcindor, Robertson (6)	The Spectrum; 15,244	43–9
53	January 31; 8:00 p.m. CST	@ Detroit (at Madison, WI)	W 131–104	Lew Alcindor (28)	Bob Dandridge (15)	Oscar Robertson (7)	Wisconsin Field House; 9,035	44–9

February: 15–2 (home: 6–0; road: 9–2)

Game	Date	Team	Score	High points	High rebounds	High assists	Location Attendance	Record
54	February 2; 10:00 p.m. CST	@ Portland	L 111–123	Lew Alcindor (38)	Alcindor, Boozer (9)	Oscar Robertson (9)	Memorial Coliseum; 9,040	44–10
55	February 3; 10:00 p.m. CST	@ San Diego	W 108-101	Lew Alcindor (25)	Lew Alcindor (12)	Oscar Robertson (10)	San Diego Sports Arena; 6,483	45–10
56	February 5; 10:00 p.m. CST	@ Los Angeles	L 93–116	Lew Alcindor (27)	Lew Alcindor (10)	Oscar Robertson (7)	The Forum; 17,505	45–11
57	February 6; 10:00 p.m. CST	@ San Francisco	W 111–85	Dandridge, McGlocklin (20)	Lew Alcindor (11)	Oscar Robertson (11)	Cow Palace; 13,298	46–11
58	February 8; 8:00 p.m. CST	Phoenix	W 118–94	Lew Alcindor (39)	Lew Alcindor (23)	Oscar Robertson (12)	Milwaukee Arena; 10,746	47–11
59	February 9; 7:05 p.m. CST	@ Detroit	W 107–106	Lew Alcindor (38)	Lew Alcindor (16)	Oscar Robertson (14)	Cobo Center; 11,648	48–11
60	February 11; 8:00 p.m. CST	Los Angeles	W 122–88	Lew Alcindor (31)	Lew Alcindor (21)	Oscar Robertson (9)	Milwaukee Arena; 10,746	49–11
61	February 13; 1:30 p.m. CST	Chicago	W 103–96	Lew Alcindor (35)	Lew Alcindor (20)	Oscar Robertson (9)	Milwaukee Arena; 10,746	50–11
62	February 14; 1:00 p.m. CST	@ Atlanta	W 124–88	Lew Alcindor (23)	Lew Alcindor (19)	John McGlocklin (11)	Alexander Memorial Coliseum; 7,192	51–11
63	February 16; 6:30 p.m. CST	@ Buffalo	W 135–103	Lew Alcindor (38)	Lew Alcindor (20)	Bob Dandridge (8)	Buffalo Memorial Auditorium; 7,243	52–11
64	February 17; 8:00 p.m. CST	Philadelphia (at Madison, WI)	W 119–114	Lew Alcindor (41)	Lew Alcindor (13)	Oscar Robertson (9)	Wisconsin Field House; 8,133	53–11
65	February 19; 10:00 p.m. CST	@ Seattle	W 128–112	Lew Alcindor (42)	Lew Alcindor (29)	Oscar Robertson (8)	Seattle Center Coliseum; 12,685	54–11
66	February 20; 10:00 p.m. CST	@ San Francisco	W 104–96	Jon McGlocklin (28)	Lew Alcindor (19)	Oscar Robertson (11)	Cow Palace; 9,145	55–11
67	February 21; 8:00 p.m. CST	@ Phoenix	W 125–97	Lew Alcindor (36)	Lew Alcindor (21)	Oscar Robertson (10)	Arizona Veterans Memorial Coliseum; 12,371	56–11
68	February 23; 8:00 p.m. CST	San Francisco	W 118–107	Oscar Robertson (26)	Lew Alcindor (16)	Oscar Robertson (6)	Milwaukee Arena; 10,746	57–11
69	February 24; 8:00 p.m. CST	San Diego	W 139–104	Bob Dandridge (33)	Alcindor, Smith (13)	Oscar Robertson (8)	Milwaukee Arena; 10,746	58–11
70	February 26; 8:00 p.m. CST	Cincinnati	W 135–111	Tied (24)	Lew Alcindor (22)	Oscar Robertson (9)	Milwaukee Arena; 10,746	59–11
71	February 28; 7:00 p.m. CST	@ Boston	W 111–99	Lew Alcindor (26)	Lew Alcindor (30)	Oscar Robertson (5)	Boston Garden; 10,880	60–11

March: 6–5 (home: 4–1; road: 2–4)

Game	Date	Team	Score	High points	High rebounds	High assists	Location Attendance	Record
72	March 1; 8:00 p.m. CST	Philadelphia	W 127–103	Alcindor, Robertson (29)	Oscar Robertson (12)	Oscar Robertson (10)	Milwaukee Arena; 10,746	61–11
73	March 3; 8:00 p.m. CST	Los Angeles	W 112–97	Oscar Robertson (24)	Bob Dandridge (8)	Greg Smith (7)	Milwaukee Arena; 10,746	62–11
74	March 4; 8:00 p.m. CST	Buffalo	W 113–116	Oscar Robertson (32)	Lew Alcindor (17)	Oscar Robertson (9)	Milwaukee Arena; 10,746	63–11
75	March 5; 7:05 p.m. CST	@ Detroit	W 108–95	Lew Alcindor (34)	Lew Alcindor (11)	Oscar Robertson (16)	Cobo Arena; 11,192	64–11
76	March 8; 8:00 p.m. CST	Seattle	W 104–99	Lew Alcindor (32)	Lew Alcindor (16)	McGlocklin, RObertson (7)	Milwaukee Arena; 10,746	65–11
77	March 9; 7:30 p.m. CST	@ Chicago	L 103–110 (OT)	Lew Alcindor (39)	Lew Alcindor (17)	Oscar Robertson (8)	Chicago Stadium; 16,277	65–12
78	March 13; 7:00 p.m. CST	@ New York	L 103–108	Lew Alcindor (34)	Lew Alcindor (16)	Jon McGlocklin (5)	Madison Square Garden; 19,500	65–13
79	March 14; 8:00 p.m. CST	Phoenix (at Madison, WI)	L 125–113	Lew Alcindor (38)	Lew Alcindor (15)	Greg Smith (6)	Wisconsin Field House; 9,035	65–14
80	March 16; 9:00 p.m. CST	@ Phoenix	W 119–111	Lew Alcindor (48)	Lew Alcindor (14)	Oscar Robertson (13)	Arizona Veterans Memorial Coliseum; 11,640	66–14
81	March 18; 10:00 p.m. CST	@ Seattle	L 121–122	Lew Alcindor (39)	Lew Alcindor (13)	Greg Smith (7)	Seattle Center Coliseum; 8,970	66–15
82	March 19; 10:00 p.m. CST	@ San Diego	L 99–111	Lew Alcindor (22)	Dick Cunningham (12)	Bob Greacen (8)	San Diego Sports Arena; 10,256	66–16

1970–71 schedule

=== Playoffs ===
1971 playoff game log
Western Conference Semifinals: 4–1 (home: 3–0; road: 1–1)

Game	Date	Team	Score	High points	High rebounds	High assists	Location Attendance	Series
1	March 27; 10:00 p.m. CST	@ San Francisco (at Oakland, CA)	W 107–96	Oscar Robertson (31)	Alcindor, Smith (10)	Oscar Robertson (9)	Oakland–Alameda County Coliseum Arena; 11,216	1–0
2	March 29; 8:00 p.m. CST	San Francisco (at Madison, WI)	W 104–90	Lew Alcindor (26)	Lew Alcindor (18)	Oscar Robertson (7)	Wisconsin Field House; 12,868	2–0
3	March 30; 8:00 p.m. CST	San Francisco (at Madison, WI)	W 114–102	Lew Alcindor (33)	Lew Alcindor (12)	Lucius Allen (8)	Wisconsin Field House; 12,868	3–0
4	April 1; 10:00 p.m. CST	@ San Francisco (at Oakland, CA)	L 104–106	Lew Alcindor (32)	Lew Alcindor (21)	Lucius Allen (6)	Oakland–Alameda County Coliseum Arena; 7,615	3–1
5	April 4; 1:00 p.m. CST	San Francisco (at Madison, WI)	W 136–86	Jon McGlocklin (28)	Lew Alcindor (17)	Lucius Allen (7)	Wisconsin Field House; 12,868	4–1

Western Conference Finals: 4–1 (home: 3–0; road: 1–1)

Game	Date	Team	Score	High points	High rebounds	High assists	Location Attendance	Series
1	April 9; 8:00 p.m. CST	Los Angeles	W 106–85	Lew Alcindor (32)	Lew Alcindor (22)	Oscar Robertson (10)	Milwaukee Arena; 10,746	1–0
2	April 11; 1:00 p.m. CST	Los Angeles	W 91–73	Lew Alcindor (22)	Bob Dandridge (11)	Oscar Robertson (7)	Milwaukee Arena; 10,746	2–0
3	April 14; 10:00 p.m. CST	@ Los Angeles	L 107–118	Bob Dandridge (25)	Lew Alcindor (19)	Oscar Robertson (9)	The Forum; 17,334	2–1
4	April 16; 10:00 p.m. CST	@ Los Angeles	W 117–94	Lew Alcindor (31)	Lew Alcindor (20)	Oscar Robertson (6)	The Forum; 17,505	3–1
5	April 18; 1:00 p.m. CST	Los Angeles	W 116–98	Greg Smith (22)	Alcindor, Dandridge (15)	Oscar Robertson (12)	Milwaukee Arena; 10,746	4–1

NBA Finals: 4–0 (home: 2–0; road: 2–0)

Game	Date	Team	Score	High points	High rebounds	High assists	Location Attendance	Series
1	April 21; 8:00 p.m. CST	Baltimore	W 98–88	Lew Alcindor (31)	Lew Alcindor (17)	Oscar Robertson (7)	Milwaukee Arena; 10,746	1–0
2	April 25; 1:00 p.m. CDT	@ Baltimore	W 102–83	Lew Alcindor (27)	Lew Alcindor (24)	Oscar Robertson (10)	Baltimore Civic Center; 12,289	2–0
3	April 28; 8:00 p.m. CDT	Baltimore	W 107–99	Bob Dandridge (29)	Lew Alcindor (21)	Oscar Robertson (12)	Milwaukee Arena; 10,746	3–0
4	April 30; 8:00 p.m. CDT	@ Baltimore	W 118–106	Oscar Robertson (30)	Alcindor, Dandridge (12)	Oscar Robertson (9)	Baltimore Civic Center; 11,842	4–0

1971 schedule

== Player statistics ==
Legend
GP	Games played	GS	Games started	MPG	Minutes per game
FG%	Field-goal percentage	3P%	3-point field-goal percentage	FT%	Free-throw percentage
RPG	Rebounds per game	APG	Assists per game	SPG	Steals per game
BPG	Blocks per game	PPG	Points per game

=== Season ===
Regular season statistics
Player	GP	GS	MPG	FG%	FT%	RPG	APG	SPG	BPG	PPG
Lew Alcindor	82		40.1	57.7	69.0	16.0	3.3			31.7
Oscar Robertson	81		39.4	49.6	85.0	5.7	8.2			19.4
Bob Dandridge	79		36.2	50.9	70.2	8.0	3.5			18.4
Jon McGlocklin	82		35.3	53.5	86.2	2.7	3.7			15.8
Greg Smith	82		29.6	51.2	66.2	7.2	2.8			11.7
Bob Boozer	80		22.2	45.0	81.8	5.4	1.6			9.1
Lucius Allen	61		19.0	44.7	70.0	2.5	2.6			7.1
McCoy McLemore	28		14.8	36.8	82.9	3.8	1.1			4.7
Gary Freeman	41		8.2	50.8	73.7	2.4	0.8			3.7
Marv Winkler	3		4.7	30.0	100.0	1.3	0.7			2.7
Dick Cunningham	76		8.9	41.5	66.1	3.4	0.6			2.6
Bob Greacen	2		21.5	8.3	42.9	3.0	6.5			2.5
Jeff Webb	29		10.3	34.6	73.3	0.8	0.7			2.2
Bill Zopf	53		7.5	36.3	55.6	0.9	1.4			2.2

=== Playoffs ===
Playoff statistics
Player	GP	GS	MPG	FG%	FT%	RPG	APG	SPG	BPG	PPG
Lew Alcindor	14		41.2	51.5	67.3	17.0	2.5			26.6
Bob Dandridge	14		38.2	46.3	78.2	9.6	3.4			19.2
Oscar Robertson	14		37.1	48.6	75.4	5.0	8.9			18.3
Jon McGlocklin	14		35.1	53.6	84.8	2.2	2.4			14.9
Greg Smith	14		32.4	54.7	55.0	8.6	2.6			11.6
Bob Boozer	14		20.2	48.2	75.9	5.3	1.2			7.4
Lucius Allen	14		22.3	50.6	71.4	2.9	3.7			7.3
Dick Cunningham	14		6.4	42.9	66.7	1.7	0.1			1.7
Bob Greacen	7		2.3	36.4	100.0	0.7	0.0			1.7
Jeff Webb	9		2.6	57.1	100.0	0.1	0.2			1.2
McCoy McLemore	10		5.2	25.0	50.0	1.6	0.8			0.7
Marv Winkler	5		1.6	0.0	0.0	0.0	0.2			0.0

== Awards and records ==
- Lew Alcindor, NBA scoring champion
- Lew Alcindor, NBA MVP
- Lew Alcindor, NBA Finals MVP

== Transactions ==
On April 21, 1970, the Bucks traded two young players, Flynn Robinson and Charlie Paulk, to the Cincinnati Royals for 10-year veteran guard Oscar Robertson.

=== Trades ===
April 21, 1970
To Milwaukee Bucks----
- Oscar Robertson
To Cincinnati Royals----
- Charlie Paulk
- Flynn Robinson
September 17, 1970
To Milwaukee Bucks----
- Lucius Allen
- Bob Boozer
To Seattle SuperSonics----
- Zaid Abdul-Aziz
February 1, 1971
To Milwaukee Bucks----
- McCoy McLemore
To Cleveland Cavaliers----
- Gary Freeman

=== Free agents ===
Player	Signed	Former team
Jeff Webb	October 5, 1970	Kansas State

Subtractions
Player	Date signed	New team
Len Chappell	Expansion Draft May 11, 1970	Cleveland Cavaliers
Freddie Crawford	Expansion Draft May 11, 1970	Buffalo Braves

== See also ==
- List of National Basketball Association longest winning streaks
