= Pete Cross =

American basketball player (1948–1977)

Personal information
- Born: March 28, 1948 Kassel, Germany
- Died: January 2, 1977 (aged 28) Redmond, Washington, U.S.
- Listed height: 6 ft 9 in (2.06 m)
- Listed weight: 230 lb (104 kg)

Career information
- High school: Bakersfield (Bakersfield, California)
- College: San Francisco (1967–1970)
- NBA draft: 1970: 2nd round, 23rd overall pick
- Drafted by: Seattle SuperSonics
- Position: Power forward / center
- Number: 41

Career history
- 1970–1972: Seattle SuperSonics
- 1972: Kansas City-Omaha Kings
- 1972–1973: Seattle SuperSonics
- 1975: Iberia Superstars

Career highlights
- 2× First-team All-WCAC (1969, 1970); Second-team All-WCAC (1968)
- Stats at NBA.com
- Stats at Basketball Reference

Peter Michael Cross (March 28, 1948 – January 2, 1977) was an American basketball player. Cross was drafted in the second round of the 1970 NBA draft by the Seattle SuperSonics. He played for Seattle as well as the Kansas City-Omaha Kings in the NBA. He played college basketball for the San Francisco Dons.

== Career ==
A 6'9" center, Cross played collegiately for San Francisco. He was selected by the Seattle SuperSonics in the second round of the 1970 NBA draft, and the Kentucky Colonels in the 1970 American Basketball Association draft.

Cross played three seasons (1970–1973) in the National Basketball Association (NBA) as a member of the Seattle SuperSonics and Kansas City-Omaha Kings. His best NBA season was his first, in which he averaged eight points and twelve rebounds per game. His 12 rebounds per game in 1970–71 is still the SuperSonics' rookie record.

He played for the Iberia Superstars in the European Professional Basketball League in 1975.

== Death ==
On January 2, 1977, Cross was found dead in his home in Redmond, Washington. His wife, Cynthia Cross, said that he had epileptic seizures. He was 28.

Cross was posthumously inducted into the University of San Francisco Dons Hall of Fame (1979), and the Kern County Sports Hall of Fame (1993).

== Career statistics ==
Legend
GP	Games played	GS	Games started	MPG	Minutes per game
FG%	Field goal percentage	3P%	3-point field goal percentage	FT%	Free throw percentage
RPG	Rebounds per game	APG	Assists per game	SPG	Steals per game
BPG	Blocks per game	PPG	Points per game	**Bold**	Career high

=== NBA ===
==== Regular season ====
Year	Team	GP	MPG	FG%	FT%	RPG	APG	PPG
1970–71	Seattle	**79**	**27.8**	**.442**	.690	**12.0**	**1.4**	**8.0**
1971–72	Seattle	74	19.2	.428	**.736**	6.9	.9	5.5
1972–73	Kansas City-Omaha	3	8.0	.000	–	1.3	.0	.0
1972–73	Seattle	26	5.1	.286	.444	2.2	.4	.8
Career		182	20.7	.431	.695	8.3	1.0	5.8
