= 1970–71 Detroit Pistons season =

NBA team season

- Head coach: Butch van Breda Kolff
- General manager: Ed Coil
- Owner: Fred Zollner
- Arena: Cobo Arena

Results
- Record: 45–37 (.549)
- Place: Division: 4th (Midwest); Conference: 6th (Western)
- Playoff finish: Did not qualify
- Stats at Basketball Reference

Local media
- Television: WJBK
- Radio: WXYZ

The 1970–71 Detroit Pistons season was the Detroit Pistons' 23rd season in the NBA and 14th season in the city of Detroit. The team played at Cobo Arena in downtown Detroit.

The Pistons finished with a 45-37 (.549) record, 4th place in the deep Midwest Division, as the NBA re-organized from 2 to 4 divisions. It was the first winning season for Detroit since the franchise relocated from Ft. Wayne in 1957. The team was led by guards Dave Bing (27.0 ppg, 5.0 apg, NBA All-Star) and Jimmy Walker (17.6 ppg) and rookie center Bob Lanier (15.6 ppg, 8.1 rpg, All-Rookie Team), who was the top pick in the 1970 NBA Draft.

== Draft picks ==
Round	Pick	Player	Position	Nationality	College
1	1	Bob Lanier	Center	United States	St. Bonaventure
16	224	Harvey Marlatt	Guard	United States	Eastern Michigan

== Roster ==
1970–71 Detroit Pistons roster
Players

Pos.	No.	Player	Height	Weight	DOB	From
PG	21	Dave Bing	6 ft 3 in (1.91 m)	180 lb (82 kg)	1943–11–24	Syracuse
SF	43	Terry Dischinger	6 ft 7 in (2.01 m)	189 lb (86 kg)	1940–11–21	Purdue
PF	17	Terry Driscoll	6 ft 7 in (2.01 m)	215 lb (98 kg)	1947–08–28	Boston College
PF	31	Bill Hewitt	6 ft 5 in (1.96 m)	210 lb (95 kg)	1944–08–08	USC
PG	30	Howard Komives	6 ft 1 in (1.85 m)	185 lb (84 kg)	1941–05–09	Bowling Green
C	16	Bob Lanier	6 ft 11 in (2.11 m)	250 lb (113 kg)	1948–09–10	St. Bonaventure
SG	26	Harvey Marlatt	6 ft 3 in (1.91 m)	185 lb (84 kg)	1948–08–26	Eastern Michigan
SF	23	Steve Mix	6 ft 7 in (2.01 m)	215 lb (98 kg)	1947–12–30	Toledo
C	34	Otto Moore	6 ft 11 in (2.11 m)	205 lb (93 kg)	1946–08–27	Texas–Pan American
PF	51	Erwin Mueller	6 ft 8 in (2.03 m)	230 lb (104 kg)	1944–03–12	San Francisco
SF	15	Bob Quick	6 ft 5 in (1.96 m)	215 lb (98 kg)	1946–03–05	Xavier
SG	24	Jimmy Walker	6 ft 3 in (1.91 m)	195 lb (88 kg)	1944–04–08	Providence

Coaches
Head coach
- Butch van Breda Kolff

Legend
- (DP) Unsigned draft pick
- (FA) Free agent
- (S) Suspended
- Injured

Roster

== Regular season ==
=== Season standings ===
Midwest Division	W	L	PCT	GB	Home	Road	Neutral	Div
y-Milwaukee Bucks	66	16	.805	–	34–2	28–13	4–1	14–4
x-Chicago Bulls	51	31	.622	15	30–11	17–19	4–1	7–11
Phoenix Suns	48	34	.585	18	27–14	19–20	2–0	9–9
Detroit Pistons	45	37	.549	21	24–17	20–19	1–1	6–12

#	Western Conference			
#	Team	W	L	PCT
1	z-Milwaukee Bucks	66	16	.805
2	y-Los Angeles Lakers	48	34	.585
3	x-Chicago Bulls	51	31	.622
4	x-San Francisco Warriors	41	41	.500
5	Phoenix Suns	48	34	.585
6	Detroit Pistons	45	37	.549
7	San Diego Rockets	40	42	.488
8	Seattle SuperSonics	38	44	.463
9	Portland Trail Blazers	29	53	.354

z, y – division champions
x – clinched playoff spot

=== Game log ===
1970–71 game log
Total: 45–37 (home: 24–17; road: 20–19)
October: 0–0 (home: 0–0; road: 0–0)

Game	Date	Team	Score	High points	High rebounds	High assists	Location Attendance	Record
1	October 14	@ Seattle	123–117	Dave Bing (25)				1–0
2	October 16	@ San Francisco	120–106	Dave Bing (27)				2–0
3	October 17, 1970	@ Phoenix	W 110–107	Dave Bing (23)			Arizona Veterans Memorial Coliseum	3-0
4	October 20, 1970	Milwaukee	W 115–114	Dave Bing (37)	Steve Mix (11)	Dave Bing, Jimmy Walker (5)	Cobo Center	4-0
5	October 21	@ Boston	121–118	Dave Bing (35)	5–0			
6	October 22	Atlanta	101–120	Jimmy Walker (29)	6–0			
7	October 24	@ Buffalo	114–95	Bing, Walker (20)	7–0			
8	October 26	Seattle	111–142	Dave Bing (35)	8–0			
9	October 28	@ Baltimore	109–103	Jimmy Walker (20)	9–0			
10	October 31	@ New York	89–107	Dave Bing (21)	9–1			

November: 0–0 (home: 0–0; road: 0–0)

Game	Date	Team	Score	High points	High rebounds	High assists	Location Attendance	Record
11	November 3	Cincinnati	112–115	Dave Bing (31)	10–1			
12	November 4	@ Atlanta	117–105	Dave Bing (25)	11–1			
13	November 5	Buffalo	109–121	Dave Bing (28)	12–1			
14	November 7	@ Chicago	99–125	Dave Bing (23)	12–2			
15	November 11	Los Angeles	117–115	Dave Bing (35)	12–3			
16	November 13	@ Los Angeles	109–122	Dave Bing (20)	12–4			
17	November 14	@ San Diego	101–112	Dave Bing (23)	12–5			
18	November 15	@ Phoenix	104–108	Dave Bing (26)	12–6			
19	November 17	Philadelphia	113–91	Dave Bing (23)	12–7			
20	November 19	Phoenix	110–112	Jimmy Walker (23)	13–7			
21	November 20	@ Philadelphia	120–112	Bob Lanier (24)	14–7			
22	November 21	@ Cincinnati	102–114	Dave Bing (21)	14–8			
23	November 24	San Diego	104–111	Dave Bing (35)	15–8			
24	November 25	@ Milwaukee	87–113	Otto Moore (17)	15–9			
25	November 28	Boston	121–98	Dave Bing (32)	15–10			
26	November 29	@ Cleveland	120–99	Dave Bing (27)	16–10			

December: 0–0 (home: 0–0; road: 0–0)

Game	Date	Team	Score	High points	High rebounds	High assists	Location Attendance	Record
27	December 2	New York	82–101	Dave Bing (29)	17–10			
28	December 4	Chicago	103–107	Jimmy Walker (34)	18–10			
29	December 9	San Francisco	110–99	Bing, Walker (25)	18–11			
30	December 11	@ Boston	121–118 (OT)	Dave Bing (33)	19–11			
31	December 12	Buffalo	93–92	Dave Bing (21)	19–12			
32	December 13	@ Los Angeles	103–100	Terry Dischinger (20)	20–12			
33	December 15	@ Portland	111–103	Dave Bing (31)	21–12			
34	December 17	@ Phoenix	114–117 (OT)	Jimmy Walker (38)	21–13			
35	December 18	@ San Diego	129–116	Dave Bing (30)	22–13			
36	December 20	N Cincinnati	136–135 (2OT)	Dave Bing (37)	23–13			
37	December 25	@ Philadelphia	100–105	Dave Bing (28)	23–14			
38	December 26	@ Chicago	117–114	Bing, Lanier (26)	24–14			
39	December 29	Atlanta	97–99	Jimmy Walker (21)	25–14			
40	December 30	@ Cincinnati	119–115	Dave Bing (28)	26–14			

January: 0–0 (home: 0–0; road: 0–0)

Game	Date	Team	Score	High points	High rebounds	High assists	Location Attendance	Record
41	January 2	Baltimore	108–99	Dave Bing (33)	26–15			
42	January 5	@ Atlanta	98–90	Otto Moore (22)	27–15			
43	January 6	San Diego	99–100	Dave Bing (30)	28–15			
44	January 8	Cincinnati	109–115	Dave Bing (31)	29–15			
45	January 9	@ Milwaukee	100–118	Dave Bing (25)	29–16			
46	January 10	Los Angeles	109–118	Jimmy Walker (29)	30–16			
47	January 14	Cleveland	106–108	Dave Bing (34)	31–16			
48	January 15	@ Buffalo	99–97 (OT)	Jimmy Walker (19)	32–16			
49	January 16	Boston	118–121	Dave Bing (31)	33–16			
50	January 19	Seattle	102–106	Dave Bing (27)	34–16			
51	January 22	Portland	123–112	Dave Bing (36)	34–17			
52	January 24	New York	117–105	Dave Bing (26)	34–18			
53	January 27	San Francisco	129–112	Dave Bing (35)	34–19			
54	January 29	San Diego	104–131	Dave Bing (34)	35–19			
55	January 31	N Milwaukee	131–104	Dave Bing (26)	35–20			

February: 0–0 (home: 0–0; road: 0–0)

Game	Date	Team	Score	High points	High rebounds	High assists	Location Attendance	Record
56	February 2	Baltimore	113–116	Dave Bing (29)	36–20			
57	February 5	New York	99–108	Dave Bing (31)	37–20			
58	February 7	@ Baltimore	105–108	Dave Bing (26)	37–21			
59	February 9	Milwaukee	107–106	Bing, Walker (28)	37–22			
60	February 12	Philadelphia	109–118	Dave Bing (27)	38–22			
61	February 14	Boston	110–108	Dave Bing (27)	38–23			
62	February 16	Baltimore	95–110	Dave Bing (36)	39–23			
63	February 19	@ Chicago	114–115 (OT)	Bing, Walker (27)	39–24			
64	February 20	@ New York	94–108	Howard Komives (20)	39–25			
65	February 21	Chicago	125–112	Dave Bing (54)	39–26			
66	February 24	San Francisco	117–115	Dave Bing (32)	39–27			
67	February 26	@ Buffalo	127–122 (OT)	Dave Bing (40)	40–27			
68	February 27	Phoenix	124–117	Dave Bing (30)	40–28			
69	February 28	@ Atlanta	106–105	Bob Lanier (28)	41–28			

March: 0–0 (home: 0–0; road: 0–0)

Game	Date	Team	Score	High points	High rebounds	High assists	Location Attendance	Record
70	March 2	Portland	122–128	Bob Lanier (38)	42–28			
71	March 5	Milwaukee	108–95	Dave Bing (39)	42–29			
72	March 6	@ Philadelphia	115–121	Bob Lanier (31)	42–30			
73	March 7	Cleveland	104–100	Dave Bing (30)	42–31			
74	March 9	Phoenix	114–108	Dave Bing (49)	42–32			
75	March 11	@ Seattle	97–130	Dave Bing (22)	42–33			
76	March 12	@ Portland	133–129	Dave Bing (25)	43–33			
77	March 13	@ San Francisco	107–116	Howard Komives (26)	43–34			
78	March 14	@ Los Angeles	100–110	Dave Bing (26)	43–35			
79	March 17	@ San Diego	99–106	Jimmy Walker (20)	43–36			
80	March 19	Buffalo	105–111	Bob Lanier (40)	44–36			
81	March 20	@ Cleveland	103–114	Erwin Mueller (23)	44–37			
82	March 21	Chicago	111–116	Bing, Mueller, Quick (18)	45–37			

1970–71 schedule

== Awards and records ==
- Dave Bing, All-NBA First Team
- Bob Lanier, NBA All-Rookie Team 1st Team

== Transactions ==
=== Free agents ===
Subtractions
Player	Date signed	New team
Paul Long	Expansion Draft May 11, 1970	Buffalo Braves
McCoy McLemore	Expansion Draft May 11, 1970	Cleveland Cavaliers
