= 1970–71 Phoenix Suns season =

Professional basketball season

- Head coach: Cotton Fitzsimmons
- General manager: Jerry Colangelo
- Owners: Karl Eller, Don Pitt, Don Diamond, Bhavik Darji Marvin Meyer, Richard L. Bloch
- Arena: Arizona Veterans Memorial Coliseum

Results
- Record: 48–34 (.585)
- Place: Division: 3rd (Midwest); Conference: 5th (Western)
- Playoff finish: Did not qualify
- Stats at Basketball Reference

Local media
- Television: KTAR-TV
- Radio: KTAR

The 1970–71 Phoenix Suns season was the third season for the Phoenix Suns of the National Basketball Association. Head coach Cotton Fitzsimmons lead the Suns, in the NBA's first season which separated the teams into both conferences and divisions as the league continued to gain more teams. It was the first season the Suns would be without the services of All-Star guard Gail Goodrich. With a 48–34 record (fourth best in the league), the Suns set the NBA record for the team with the best winning percentage not to make the playoffs. The team would break their own record the next year with a 49–33 finish. All home games were played at Arizona Veterans Memorial Coliseum.

The Suns were led in scoring by Dick Van Arsdale with 21.9 points per game. Connie Hawkins finished the season averaging 20.9 points and 9.1 rebounds per contest. Paul Silas led the Suns with 12.5 rebounds per game, the highest-ever average in Suns history, while Neal Walk garnered 8.2 rebounds to go with his 12.9 points a game.

Goodrich, a native of Los Angeles and who played college ball at UCLA, was traded before the season back to the Los Angeles Lakers, where he had played before being acquired in the expansion draft of 1968. In exchange, the Suns obtained the 29-year-old 7-footer Mel Counts, who was coming off a career-high 12.6 average in points. Goodrich would go on to play nine more seasons in the NBA, six of those with the Lakers. During those six years, he would average 22.3 points per game, appear in four All-Star Games and be named to an All-NBA First Team. Meanwhile, Counts averaged 11 points and 6.3 rebounds in his first of two seasons with the Suns.

== Offseason ==
=== NBA draft ===
Round	Pick	Player	Position	Nationality	College
1	10	Greg Howard	Forward	United States	New Mexico
2	27	Fred Taylor	Guard	United States	Texas-Pan Am
3	29	Joe DePre	Guard	United States	St. John's
3	44	Greg McDivitt	Forward	United States	Ohio
3	48	Vann Williford	Forward	United States	North Carolina State
4	61	Bob Lienhard	Center	United States	Georgia
5	78	John Canine	Guard	United States	Ohio
6	95	Joe Thomas	Forward	United States	Marquette
7	112	Heyward Dotson	Guard	United States	Columbia
8	129	Steve Patterson	Center	United States	UCLA
9	146	Carl Ashley	Forward	United States	Wyoming
10	163	Gerhardus Schreur	Forward	United States	Arizona State
11	178	Jim Walls	Guard	United States	Clark
12	190	Ric Cobb	Center	United States	Marquette
13	200	Fred Carpenter	Forward	United States	Hawaii
14	210	Chad Calabria	Guard	United States	Iowa
15	219	Walt Williams	Forward	United States	Miami (Ohio)

== Roster ==
1970–71 Phoenix Suns roster
Players

Pos.	No.	Player	Height	Weight	DOB	From
C	31	Mel Counts	7 ft 0 in (2.13 m)	230 lb (104 kg)	1941-10-16	Oregon State
F	16	Lamar Green	6 ft 7 in (2.01 m)	210 lb (95 kg)	1947-03-22	Morehead State
G	23	Art Harris	6 ft 4 in (1.93 m)	185 lb (84 kg)	1947-01-13	Stanford
G	11	Clem Haskins	6 ft 3 in (1.91 m)	195 lb (88 kg)	1943-07-11	Western Kentucky
F/C	42	Connie Hawkins	6 ft 8 in (2.03 m)	210 lb (95 kg)	1942-07-17	Iowa
F	44	Greg Howard	6 ft 9 in (2.06 m)	215 lb (98 kg)	1948-01-08	New Mexico
F	29	Paul Silas	6 ft 7 in (2.01 m)	220 lb (100 kg)	1943-07-12	Creighton
G	10	Fred Taylor	6 ft 5 in (1.96 m)	180 lb (82 kg)	1948-02-05	Texas–Pan American
F	40	Joe Thomas	6 ft 6 in (1.98 m)	205 lb (93 kg)	1948-03-09	Marquette
G/F	5	Dick Van Arsdale	6 ft 5 in (1.96 m)	210 lb (95 kg)	1943-02-22	Indiana
C	41	Neal Walk	6 ft 10 in (2.08 m)	220 lb (100 kg)	1948-07-29	Florida
G/F	25	John Wetzel	6 ft 5 in (1.96 m)	190 lb (86 kg)	1944-10-22	Virginia Tech

Coaches
Head coach
- Cotton Fitzsimmons (Midwestern State)

Legend
- (DP) Unsigned draft pick
- (FA) Free agent
- (S) Suspended
- Injured

== Regular season ==
=== Standings ===
Midwest Division	W	L	PCT	GB	Home	Road	Neutral	Div
y-Milwaukee Bucks	66	16	.805	–	34–2	28–13	4–1	14–4
x-Chicago Bulls	51	31	.622	15	30–11	17–19	4–1	7–11
Phoenix Suns	48	34	.585	18	27–14	19–20	2–0	9–9
Detroit Pistons	45	37	.549	21	24–17	20–19	1–1	6–12

#	Western Conference			
#	Team	W	L	PCT
1	z-Milwaukee Bucks	66	16	.805
2	y-Los Angeles Lakers	48	34	.585
3	x-Chicago Bulls	51	31	.622
4	x-San Francisco Warriors	41	41	.500
5	Phoenix Suns	48	34	.585
6	Detroit Pistons	45	37	.549
7	San Diego Rockets	40	42	.488
8	Seattle SuperSonics	38	44	.463
9	Portland Trail Blazers	29	53	.354

=== Game log ===
1970–71 game log
Total: 48–34 (home: 27–14; road: 21–20)
October: 3–6 (home: 3–2; road: 0–4)

Game	Date	Team	Score	High points	Location Attendance	Record	Streak
1	October 15	San Diego	W 119–100	Dick Van Arsdale (30)	Arizona Veterans Memorial Coliseum; 7,523	1–0	W 1
2	October 17	Detroit	L 107–110	Connie Hawkins (26)	Arizona Veterans Memorial Coliseum; 8,646	1–1	L 1
3	October 20	@ San Diego	L 114–115	Dick Van Arsdale (26)	San Diego Sports Arena; 7,246	1–2	L 2
4	October 21	@ Seattle	L 106–110	Greg Howard (26)	Seattle Center Coliseum; 6,923	1–3	L 3
5	October 23	Cleveland	W 108–104	Connie Hawkins (27)	Arizona Veterans Memorial Coliseum; 7,822	2–3	W 1
6	October 25	San Diego	W 117–98	Clem Haskins (24)	Arizona Veterans Memorial Coliseum; 5,697	3–3	W 2
7	October 28	Chicago	L 105–118	Connie Hawkins (26)	Arizona Veterans Memorial Coliseum; 6,343	3–4	L 1
8	October 30	@ Boston	L 112–127	Paul Silas (23)	Boston Garden; 5,392	3–5	L 2
9	October 31	@ Baltimore	L 103–106	Dick Van Arsdale (26)	Baltimore Civic Center; 4,527	3–6	L 3

November: 11–6 (home: 5–1; road: 6–5)

Game	Date	Team	Score	High points	Location Attendance	Record	Streak
10	November 2	Buffalo	W 110–102	Connie Hawkins (29)	Arizona Veterans Memorial Coliseum; 8,000	4–6	W 1
11	November 4	@ Cincinnati	W 133–115	Clem Haskins, Connie Hawkins, Dick Van Arsdale (25)	Cincinnati Gardens; 2,091	5–6	W 2
12	November 6	@ Chicago	W 105–102	Dick Van Arsdale (23)	Chicago Stadium; 8,107	6–6	W 3
13	November 7	@ Atlanta	W 107–100	Connie Hawkins (21)	Alexander Memorial Coliseum; 5,116	7–6	W 4
14	November 8	@ Milwaukee	L 105–125	Dick Van Arsdale (23)	Milwaukee Arena; 10,746	7–7	L 1
15	November 11	Portland	W 114–100	Dick Van Arsdale (28)	Arizona Veterans Memorial Coliseum; 6,020	8–7	W 1
16	November 13	Cincinnati	W 115–109	Clem Haskins, Connie Hawkins (26)	Arizona Veterans Memorial Coliseum; 9,802	9–7	W 2
17	November 15	Detroit	W 108–104	Clem Haskins (28)	Arizona Veterans Memorial Coliseum; 7,344	10–7	W 3
18	November 17	@ New York	L 100–103	Clem Haskins, Dick Van Arsdale (23)	Madison Square Garden; 18,275	10–8	L 1
19	November 19	@ Detroit	L 110–112	Dick Van Arsdale (23)	Cobo Arena; 3,594	10–9	L 2
20	November 20	@ Baltimore	L 110–121	Connie Hawkins (23)	Baltimore Civic Center; 4,572	10–10	L 3
21	November 21	@ Philadelphia	W 125–119	Dick Van Arsdale (30)	The Spectrum; 6,519	11–10	W 1
22	November 22	@ Cleveland	W 114–99	Connie Hawkins (29)	Cleveland Arena; 2,405	12–10	W 2
23	November 24	@ Buffalo	L 106–112	Clem Haskins (25)	Buffalo Memorial Auditorium; 7,209	12–11	L 1
24	November 26	Seattle	W 126–115	Connie Hawkins (29)	Arizona Veterans Memorial Coliseum; 7,192	13–11	W 1
25	November 27	@ Los Angeles	W 116–105	Paul Silas (27)	The Forum; 13,089	14–11	W 2
26	November 28	San Diego	L 116–117	Connie Hawkins (31)	Arizona Veterans Memorial Coliseum; 11,470	14–12	L 1

December: 9–7 (home: 7–4; road: 2–3)

Game	Date	Team	Score	High points	Location Attendance	Record	Streak
27	December 2	Atlanta	W 126–112	Connie Hawkins (32)	Arizona Veterans Memorial Coliseum; 8,907	15–12	W 1
28	December 4	@ Portland	W 126–121	Connie Hawkins (29)	Memorial Coliseum; 3,927	16–12	W 2
29	December 5	@ San Francisco	W 105–100	Connie Hawkins (24)	Oakland–Alameda County Coliseum Arena; 5,481	17–12	W 3
30	December 6	San Diego	W 108–102	Connie Hawkins (26)	Arizona Veterans Memorial Coliseum; 5,935	18–12	W 4
31	December 8	Los Angeles	L 112–121	Connie Hawkins (24)	Arizona Veterans Memorial Coliseum; 7,702	18–13	L 1
32	December 11	@ San Diego	L 104–110	Connie Hawkins (26)	San Diego Sports Arena; 8,365	18–14	L 2
33	December 12	Milwaukee	W 113–111	Dick Van Arsdale (26)	Arizona Veterans Memorial Coliseum; 11,002	19–14	W 1
34	December 15	San Francisco	L 123–129	Clem Haskins (25)	Arizona Veterans Memorial Coliseum; 5,901	19–15	L 1
35	December 17	Detroit	W 117–114 (OT)	Connie Hawkins (29)	Arizona Veterans Memorial Coliseum; 5,548	20–15	W 1
36	December 19	@ Seattle	L 131–135	Dick Van Arsdale (35)	Seattle Center Coliseum; 6,443	20–16	L 1
37	December 20	New York	L 118–133	Dick Van Arsdale (20)	Arizona Veterans Memorial Coliseum; 8,445	20–17	L 2
38	December 22	Philadelphia	L 129–133 (OT)	Connie Hawkins (33)	Arizona Veterans Memorial Coliseum; 7,248	20–18	L 3
39	December 25	Atlanta	W 127–115	Dick Van Arsdale (32)	Arizona Veterans Memorial Coliseum; 10,186	21–18	W 1
40	December 26	Portland	W 115–103	Neal Walk (27)	Arizona Veterans Memorial Coliseum; 6,102	22–18	W 2
41	December 27	@ Los Angeles	L 110–128	Neal Walk (20)	The Forum; 15,163	22–19	L 1
42	December 30	Los Angeles	W 132–114	Clem Haskins (31)	Arizona Veterans Memorial Coliseum; 8,164	23–19	W 1

January: 11–4 (home: 7–2; road: 4–2)

Game	Date	Team	Score	High points	Location Attendance	Record	Streak
43	January 2	@ San Francisco	W 122–116 (OT)	Dick Van Arsdale (31)	Cow Palace; 3,812	24–19	W 2
44	January 3	San Francisco	W 102–81	Clem Haskins (32)	Arizona Veterans Memorial Coliseum; 6,196	25–19	W 3
45	January 8	@ Boston	L 114–122	Dick Van Arsdale (24)	Boston Garden; 7,124	25–20	L 1
46	January 9	@ Philadelphia	L 112–123	Clem Haskins (22)	The Spectrum; 7,826	25–21	L 2
47	January 10	@ Atlanta	W 116–105	Paul Silas (23)	Alexander Memorial Coliseum; 4,447	26–21	W 1
All-Star Break
48	January 14	New York	W 107–88	Dick Van Arsdale (25)	Arizona Veterans Memorial Coliseum; 9,051	27–21	W 2
49	January 16	Baltimore	W 117–100	Clem Haskins (26)	Arizona Veterans Memorial Coliseum; 9,002	28–21	W 3
50	January 18	@ Cincinnati	W 118–99	Clem Haskins (29)	Omaha, Nebraska; 3,149	29–21	W 4
51	January 20	Cincinnati	L 114–126	Clem Haskins (27)	Arizona Veterans Memorial Coliseum; 5,586	29–22	L 1
52	January 22	Philadelphia	L 116–117	Dick Van Arsdale (23)	Arizona Veterans Memorial Coliseum; 8,059	29–23	L 2
53	January 24	Chicago	W 113–112	Mel Counts, Paul Silas (18)	Arizona Veterans Memorial Coliseum; 5,923	30–23	W 1
54	January 26	Buffalo	W 114–82	Dick Van Arsdale (23)	Arizona Veterans Memorial Coliseum; 5,486	31–23	W 2
55	January 28	Los Angeles	W 118–112	Mel Counts (29)	Arizona Veterans Memorial Coliseum; 8,036	32–23	W 3
56	January 29	@ Portland	W 131–122	Dick Van Arsdale (36)	Memorial Coliseum; 5,877	33–23	W 4
57	January 30	Seattle	W 134–116	Dick Van Arsdale (30)	Arizona Veterans Memorial Coliseum; 10,412	34–23	W 5

February: 9–4 (home: 3–2; road: 6–2)

Game	Date	Team	Score	High points	Location Attendance	Record	Streak
58	February 4	San Francisco	L 105–117	Connie Hawkins (26)	Arizona Veterans Memorial Coliseum; 6,711	34–24	L 1
59	February 6	Cleveland	W 119–91	Neal Walk, John Wetzel (22)	Arizona Veterans Memorial Coliseum; 5,812	35–24	W 1
60	February 8	@ Milwaukee	L 94–118	Connie Hawkins (23)	Milwaukee Arena; 10,746	35–25	L 1
61	February 9	@ Baltimore	W 120–115	Dick Van Arsdale (27)	Baltimore Civic Center; 4,054	36–25	W 1
62	February 12	@ Cleveland	W 114–105	Dick Van Arsdale (24)	Cleveland Arena; 4,297	37–25	W 2
63	February 13	@ New York	L 97–114	Connie Hawkins (25)	Madison Square Garden; 19,500	37–26	L 1
64	February 14	@ Buffalo	W 108–97	Dick Van Arsdale (29)	Buffalo Memorial Auditorium; 4,376	38–26	W 1
65	February 16	@ Boston	W 119–116	Connie Hawkins (27)	Boston Garden; 6,091	39–26	W 2
66	February 17	Cincinnati	W 133–117	Clem Haskins (29)	Arizona Veterans Memorial Coliseum; 8,006	40–26	W 3
67	February 19	Boston	W 116–112	Dick Van Arsdale (26)	Arizona Veterans Memorial Coliseum; 12,256	41–26	W 4
68	February 21	Milwaukee	L 97–125	Dick Van Arsdale (21)	Arizona Veterans Memorial Coliseum; 12,371	41–27	L 1
69	February 26	@ Philadelphia	W 108–94	Connie Hawkins (30)	The Spectrum; 8,586	42–27	W 1
70	February 27	@ Detroit	W 124–117	Dick Van Arsdale (42)	Cobo Arena; 8,878	43–27	W 2

March: 5–7 (home: 2–3; road: 3–4)

Game	Date	Team	Score	High points	Location Attendance	Record	Streak
71	March 3	Chicago	W 115–90	Clem Haskins (28)	Arizona Veterans Memorial Coliseum; 12,371	44–27	W 3
72	March 7	Baltimore	L 108–117	Connie Hawkins (19)	Arizona Veterans Memorial Coliseum; 9,370	44–28	L 1
73	March 9	@ Detroit	W 114–108	Dick Van Arsdale (31)	Cobo Arena; 4,269	45–28	W 1
74	March 10	@ Atlanta	L 98–139	Dick Van Arsdale (19)	Alexander Memorial Coliseum; 6,266	45–29	L 1
75	March 12	@ Chicago	L 92–116	Connie Hawkins (27)	Chicago Stadium; 14,703	45–30	L 2
76	March 13	@ Chicago	L 99–111	Connie Hawkins (22)	Chicago Stadium; 17,505	45–31	L 3
77	March 14	@ Milwaukee	W 125–113	Connie Hawkins (27)	Madison, WI; 9,035	46–31	W 1
78	March 16	Milwaukee	L 111–119	Connie Hawkins, Dick Van Arsdale (28)	Arizona Veterans Memorial Coliseum; 11,640	46–32	L 1
79	March 18	New York	L 123–131 (OT)	Connie Hawkins (35)	Arizona Veterans Memorial Coliseum; 7,454	46–33	L 2
80	March 19	@ Los Angeles	W 111–106	Dick Van Arsdale (25)	The Forum; 17,254	47–33	W 1
81	March 20	Seattle	W 114–107	Paul Silas (24)	Arizona Veterans Memorial Coliseum; 8,134	48–33	W 2
82	March 21	@ San Diego	L 114–132	Clem Haskins (25)	San Diego Sports Arena; 5,840	48–34	L 1

1970–71 schedule

== Awards and honors ==
=== All-Star ===
- Connie Hawkins was voted as a starter for the Western Conference in the All-Star Game. It was his second consecutive All-Star selection.
- Dick Van Arsdale was selected as a reserve for the Western Conference in the All-Star Game. It was his third consecutive All-Star selection.

=== Season ===
- Paul Silas was named to the NBA All-Defensive Second Team.

== Player statistics ==
Legend
GP	Games played	MPG	Minutes per game
FG%	Field-goal percentage	FT%	Free-throw percentage
RPG	Rebounds per game	APG	Assists per game
PPG	Points per game

=== Season ===
Player	GP	MPG	FG%	FT%	RPG	APG	PPG
Mel Counts	80	20.9	.457	.753	6.3	1.7	11.0
Lamar Green	68	19.5	.453	.604	6.9	0.8	5.9
Art Harris	56	17.0	.411	.611	1.8	2.4	8.3
Clem Haskins	82	33.7	.440	.784	4.0	4.7	17.8
Connie Hawkins	71	37.5	.434	.816^	9.1	4.5	20.9
Greg Howard	44	9.7	.393	.638	2.7	0.6	3.9
Paul Silas	81	36.3	.428	.685	12.5	3.0	11.9
Fred Taylor	54	10.2	.387	.624	1.6	0.9	5.5
Joe Thomas	39	5.2	.267	.450	1.1	0.4	1.4
Dick Van Arsdale	81	39.0	.452	.811	3.9	4.1	21.9
Neal Walk	82	24.8	.451	.765	8.2	1.4	12.9
John Wetzel	70	15.6	.431	.822^	2.2	1.6	4.7

^ – Minimum 350 free throw attempts.

== Transactions ==
=== Trades ===
April 23, 1970
To Chicago Bulls

(United States) Jim Fox

1971 second-round draft pick

To Phoenix Suns

(United States) Clem Haskins
May 20, 1970
To Los Angeles Lakers

(United States) Gail Goodrich
To Phoenix Suns

(United States) Mel Counts
July 8, 1970
To New York Knicks

(United States) Heywood Dotson
To Phoenix Suns

1971 fifth-round draft pick

=== Free agents ===
==== Subtractions ====
Date	Player	Reason left	New team
May 11, 1970	Jerry Chambers	Expansion draft	Portland Trail Blazers
May 11, 1970	Stan McKenzie	Expansion draft	Portland Trail Blazers
July 27, 1970	Neil Johnson	Waived	Virginia Squires (ABA)
