= NBA rebounding leaders =

NBA rebounding leader may refer to:

- List of NBA annual rebounding leaders
- List of NBA career rebounding leaders
- List of NBA career playoff rebounding leaders
- List of NBA single-game rebounding leaders
- List of NBA single-season rebounding leaders
