= Ralph Ogden =

American basketball player

Personal information
- Born: January 25, 1948 (age 78) Santa Clara, California, U.S.
- Listed height: 6 ft 5 in (1.96 m)
- Listed weight: 205 lb (93 kg)

Career information
- High school: Abraham Lincoln (San Jose, California)
- College: Santa Clara (1967–1970)
- NBA draft: 1970: 4th round, 53rd overall pick
- Drafted by: San Francisco Warriors
- Playing career: 1970–1971
- Position: Small forward
- Number: 22

Career history
- 1970–1971: San Francisco Warriors

Career highlights
- First-team All-WCC (1970); Second-team All-WCC (1969)
- Stats at NBA.com
- Stats at Basketball Reference

Ralph Allan Ogden (born January 25, 1948) is an American former professional basketball player who played in the National Basketball Association (NBA). Ogden played for one season with the San Francisco Warriors. He recorded career totals of 42 points, 32 rebounds and 9 assists.

Ogden spent his prep years playing at Lincoln High School in San Jose, California. In 1965 and 1966, he earned All-CCS and All-Northern California honors. During his senior season, he guided the Lions to an unblemished 29–0 record and the Peninsula Basketball Championship title.

Ogden played college basketball for the Santa Clara Broncos, and for two seasons, he played alongside his older brother, Bud. Bud was a consensus First Team All-American as a senior in 1968–69. In Ogden's career, he scored 1,280 points while averaging 15.8 points per game. In the two seasons, the Ogden brothers played together (1967–68 and 1968–69), the Broncos went 49–6, won two Pac-8 Conference championships and made it to the NCAA Division I men's basketball tournament's West regional finals twice (both times losing to the Lew Alcindor-led and eventual national champion UCLA Bruins).

Ogden was selected in the 4th round (53rd overall) of the 1970 NBA draft by the San Francisco Warriors, then played one season with them before being waived. Although he was finished with his NBA career, Ogden would go on to play and then coach professional basketball in Germany for more than 30 years. One of the teams he played for was Oldenburger TB, and in 1976, he helped the team move up to the top division in the Bundesliga by virtue of their record.

== Personal ==
Ogden's father, Carlos Ogden Sr., fought in World War II and earned one Medal of Honor, three Purple Hearts and one Bronze Star Medal. He has three brothers – Bud, who also played in the NBA, Jim and Fred.

== Career statistics ==
Legend
GP	Games played	GS	Games started	MPG	Minutes per game
FG%	Field goal percentage	3P%	3-point field goal percentage	FT%	Free throw percentage
RPG	Rebounds per game	APG	Assists per game	SPG	Steals per game
BPG	Blocks per game	PPG	Points per game	**Bold**	Career high

=== NBA ===
==== Regular season ====
Year	Team	GP	MPG	FG%	FT%	RPG	APG	PPG
1970–71	San Francisco	32	5.1	.239	.667	1.0	.3	1.3

==== Playoffs ====
Year	Team	GP	MPG	FG%	FT%	RPG	APG	PPG
1971	San Francisco	2	7.5	.200	1.000	2.0	.5	3.0
