= Nick Jones (basketball) =

American basketball player (born 1945)

Personal information
- Born: March 28, 1945 (age 81)
- Listed height: 6 ft 2 in (1.88 m)
- Listed weight: 190 lb (86 kg)

Career information
- High school: Marshall (Portland, Oregon)
- College: Oregon (1964–1967)
- NBA draft: 1967: 3rd round, 31st overall pick
- Drafted by: San Diego Rockets
- Playing career: 1967–1972
- Position: Point guard / shooting guard
- Number: 12, 11, 23, 15

Career history
- 1967–1968: San Diego Rockets
- 1968: Dallas Chaparrals
- 1968: Miami Floridians
- 1970–1972: San Francisco / Golden State Warriors
- 1972: Dallas Chaparrals

Career highlights
- Second-team All-AAWU (1967)
- Stats at NBA.com
- Stats at Basketball Reference

Ryan Nicholas Jones (born March 28, 1945) is an American former professional basketball player. He played in both the National Basketball Association and American Basketball Association for a number of teams between 1967 and 1972.

Nick is the brother of Steve Jones, another former NBA and ABA player.

== Career statistics ==
Legend
GP	Games played	GS	Games started	MPG	Minutes per game
FG%	Field goal percentage	3P%	3-point field goal percentage	FT%	Free throw percentage
RPG	Rebounds per game	APG	Assists per game	SPG	Steals per game
BPG	Blocks per game	PPG	Points per game	**Bold**	Career high

=== NBA/ABA ===
==== Regular season ====
Year	Team	GP	MPG	FG%	3P%	FT%	RPG	APG	PPG
1967–68	San Diego	42	14.4	.371		.797	**1.6**	**2.1**	5.4
1968–69	Dallas (ABA)	4	**15.0**	.300	.000	.333	1.3	1.3	3.5
1968–69	Miami (ABA)	3	7.0	.375	–	–	1.0	.3	2.0
1970–71	San Francisco	**81**	14.6	**.430**		.735	1.4	1.4	**6.9**
1971–72	Golden State	65	7.4	.418		**.836**	.6	.7	3.3
1972–73	Dallas (ABA)	3	5.3	.375	–	.667	.3	.3	2.7
Career (NBA)		188	12.0	.413		.772	1.1	1.3	5.3
Career (ABA)		10	9.7	.333	.000	.444	.9	.7	2.8
Career (overall)		198	11.9	.410	.000	.762	1.1	1.3	5.2

==== Playoffs ====
Year	Team	GP	MPG	FG%	FT%	RPG	APG	PPG
1971	San Francisco	**5**	**15.4**	.269	.833	**1.0**	**1.0**	**5.8**
1972	Golden State	2	3.5	**.500**	**1.000**	.0	**1.0**	2.0
Career		7	12.0	.286	.850	.7	1.0	4.7
