= Levi Fontaine =

American basketball player (born 1948)

Personal information
- Born: November 1, 1948 (age 78) Philadelphia, Pennsylvania, U.S.
- Listed height: 6 ft 4 in (1.93 m)
- Listed weight: 190 lb (86 kg)

Career information
- High school: Somerset (Princess Anne, Maryland)
- College: Maryland Eastern Shore (1966–1970)
- NBA draft: 1970: 5th round, 70th overall pick
- Drafted by: San Francisco Warriors
- Position: Shooting guard
- Number: 12

Career history
- 1970–1971: San Francisco Warriors
- Stats at NBA.com
- Stats at Basketball Reference

Levi Fontaine (born November 1, 1948) is an American former professional basketball shooting guard who played one season in the National Basketball Association (NBA) as a member of the San Francisco Warriors (1970–71). He attended the University of Maryland Eastern Shore where he was drafted by the Warriors during the fifth round of the 1970 NBA draft. Maryland averaged 102.8 points per game during Levi's senior year as it chalked up a 27–2 record, including a 23-game winning streak, and won the championship of the Central Intercollegiate Athletic Association. Levi's best single game scoring production was 39 points, and he did it four times.

== Career statistics ==
Legend
GP	Games played	GS	Games started	MPG	Minutes per game
FG%	Field goal percentage	3P%	3-point field goal percentage	FT%	Free throw percentage
RPG	Rebounds per game	APG	Assists per game	SPG	Steals per game
BPG	Blocks per game	PPG	Points per game	**Bold**	Career high

=== NBA ===
==== Regular season ====
Year	Team	GP	MPG	FG%	FT%	RPG	APG	PPG
1970–71	San Francisco	35	6.0	.366	.757	.4	.6	3.8

==== Playoffs ====
Year	Team	GP	MPG	FG%	FT%	RPG	APG	PPG
1971	San Francisco	2	4.5	.667	.333	.0	.0	2.5
