= Bud Ogden =

American basketball player-coach

Personal information
- Born: December 29, 1946 (age 79) San Luis Obispo, California, U.S.
- Listed height: 6 ft 6 in (1.98 m)
- Listed weight: 215 lb (98 kg)

Career information
- High school: Abraham Lincoln (San Jose, California)
- College: Santa Clara (1966–1969)
- NBA draft: 1969: 1st round, 13th overall pick
- Drafted by: Philadelphia 76ers
- Playing career: 1969–1971
- Position: Small forward
- Number: 28

Career history
- 1969–1971: Philadelphia 76ers

Career highlights
- Consensus second-team All-American (1969); 2× First-team All-WCC (1968, 1969); No. 34 retired by Santa Clara Broncos

Career NBA statistics
- Points: 257 (3.5 ppg)
- Rebounds: 106 (1.4 rpg)
- Assists: 48 (0.6 apg)
- Stats at NBA.com
- Stats at Basketball Reference

Carlos Carnes “Bud” Ogden (born December 29, 1946) is an American former professional basketball player who played in the National Basketball Association (NBA). Although Ogden played for two seasons with the Philadelphia 76ers, he is best remembered for his college career at Santa Clara.

== College ==
As a 6 ft 6 in (1.98 m) small forward, Bud Ogden led Santa Clara to its best years in its program's history while playing alongside his younger brother, Ralph. He played for the Broncos from 1966–67 to 1968–69, and was an integral part of an era (1967–1971) that saw the team go 70–10 overall, including two trips to the NCAA Division I men's basketball tournament. As a sophomore in 1967, Ogden scored a still-standing school record 55 points against Pepperdine, and as of the end of 2019–20 is the 16th all-time leading scorer with 1,437 points. His 18.2 points per game average is third all-time.

In 1967–68, his junior year, the Broncos went 22–4, won the West Coast Conference title, and advanced to the NCAA tournament West regional final before falling to a Lew Alcindor-led UCLA squad. The following year, he and his brother guided the Broncos to a 27–2 record, including 21 straight wins to begin the season. They were ranked as high as third in the national polls, won another West Coast Conference Title and once again met UCLA in the West regional final of the NCAA tournament. The Bruins again defeated the Broncos and went on to win the national championship. They lost by 38 points in what was Alcindor's final game at Pauley Pavilion. "To be that close to the Final Four–it was heartbreaking", Ogden said. At the conclusion of his senior year, Ogden was named a consensus Second Team All-American. On February 10, 1969, he was featured on the cover of Sports Illustrated.

Years later, he would have his jersey retired by Santa Clara. Bud and his brother Ralph were both also inducted into the San Jose Sports Hall of Fame.

== Professional ==
Bud Ogden was actually drafted into the NBA twice. After his junior season at Santa Clara, the Seattle SuperSonics selected him with the 162nd overall pick in the 1968 NBA draft. He decided to return to school however, and after a successful senior season, the Philadelphia 76ers selected him in the first round (13th overall) in the 1969 draft. Coincidentally, his brother Ralph was selected in the 1970 draft by the San Francisco Warriors and play one season for them.

Ogden played professional basketball for two seasons, both with the 76ers. In his rookie season, he was given the nickname "The Medium O" by teammates, referencing the nickname "The Big O" bestowed upon Hall of Famer Oscar Robertson. He averaged 3.5 points in two seasons and was then waived. He partially attributes his short career as being in the wrong place at the wrong time; Ogden was the power forward back-up to Billy Cunningham, a future Hall of Famer. "My take on it is that I was a power forward in a 6-foot-6 body. If I was 6-foot-8 or 6-foot-9, things might have been different – or if I was quicker. My second year they tried to make me a guard. Well, I had never handled the ball my whole life", he later recounted.

== Personal ==
Ogden's father, Carlos Ogden Sr., fought in World War II and was awarded the Medal of Honor, three Purple Hearts and one Bronze Star Medal. He credits his father as instilling grit and determination in him via playing basketball in the driveway: "Dad was merciless. He would put us into the garage door." Bud has four children, Lori, Geoffrey, Heidi-Lynn and Sydney. He has three brothers – Jim (deceased), Ralph and Fred. Bud is now retired from his careers in real estate and teaching high school algebra and special education. Ogden also coached his high school's basketball team. Prior to his first day of teaching, he was asked what he thinks of when his students were going to find out he appeared on the cover of Sports Illustrated. He said, "I can picture the kids saying, 'What? Mr. Ogden was on the cover of SI?' I can't wait to see the looks on their faces."

== Career statistics ==
Legend
GP	Games played	GS	Games started	MPG	Minutes per game
FG%	Field goal percentage	3P%	3-point field goal percentage	FT%	Free throw percentage
RPG	Rebounds per game	APG	Assists per game	SPG	Steals per game
BPG	Blocks per game	PPG	Points per game	**Bold**	Career high

=== NBA ===
==== Regular season ====
Year	Team	GP	GS	MPG	FG%	FT%	RPG	APG	PPG
1969–70	Philadelphia	**47**		**7.6**	**.477**	**.692**	**1.8**	**.7**	**4.1**
1970–71	Philadelphia	27	0	4.9	.364	**.692**	.7	.6	2.4
Career		74	0	6.6	.445	.692	1.4	.6	3.5

==== Playoffs ====
Year	Team	GP	MPG	FG%	FT%	RPG	APG	PPG
1970	Philadelphia	**1**	**12.0**	**.556**	**.500**	1.0	**6.0**	**12.0**
1971	Philadelphia	**1**	4.0	.000	–	**2.0**	.0	.0
Career		2	8.0	.455	.500	1.5	3.0	6.0
