= Nate Thurmond =

American basketball player (1941–2016)

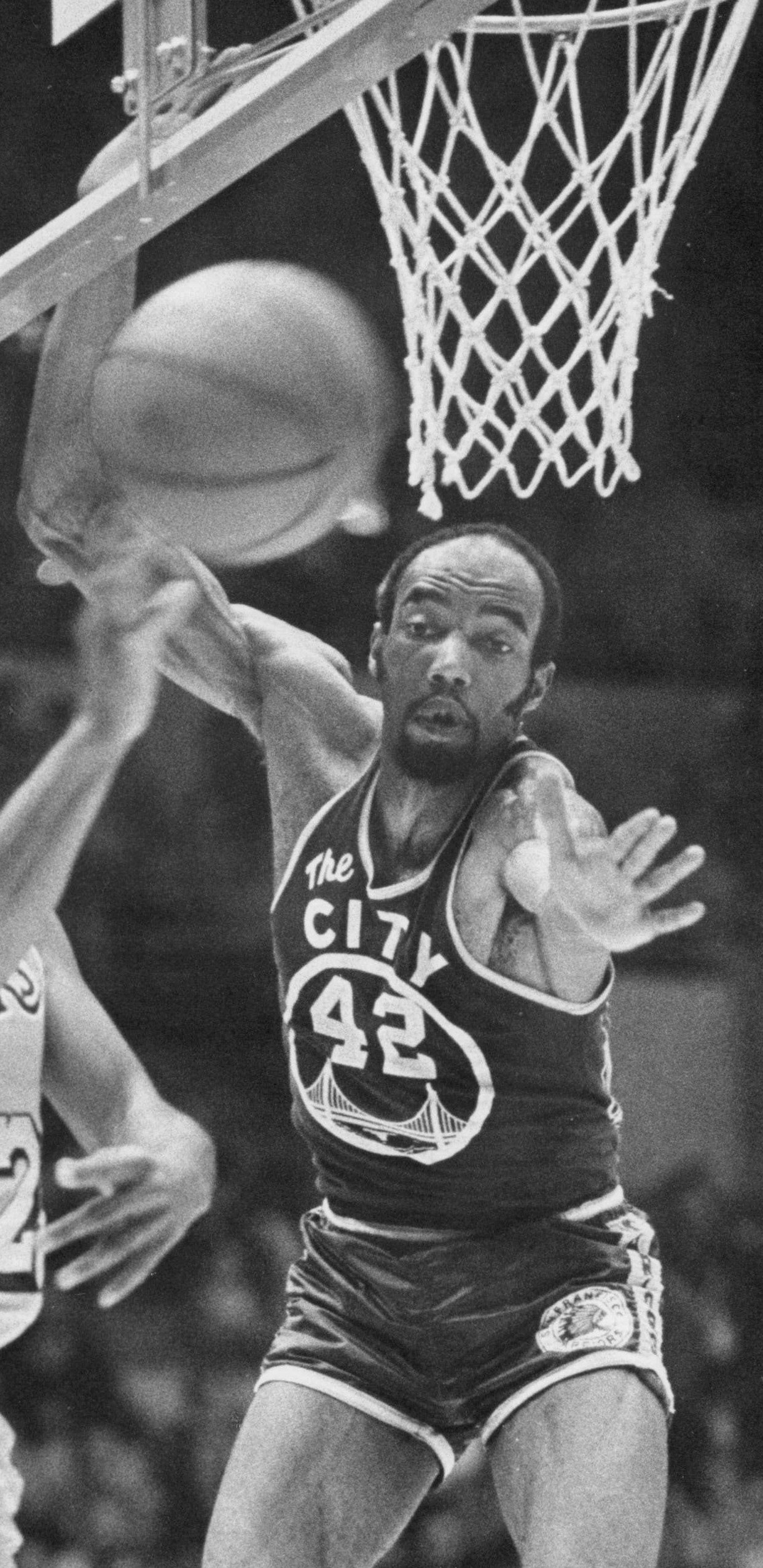
- Thurmond with the San Francisco Warriors in 1969

Personal information
- Born: July 25, 1941 Akron, Ohio, U.S.
- Died: July 16, 2016 (aged 74) San Francisco, California, U.S.
- Listed height: 6 ft 11 in (2.11 m)
- Listed weight: 225 lb (102 kg)

Career information
- High school: Central (Akron, Ohio)
- College: Bowling Green (1960–1963)
- NBA draft: 1963: 1st round, 3rd overall pick
- Drafted by: San Francisco Warriors
- Playing career: 1963–1977
- Position: Center / power forward
- Number: 42

Career history
- 1963–1974: San Francisco / Golden State Warriors
- 1974–1975: Chicago Bulls
- 1975–1977: Cleveland Cavaliers

Career highlights
- 7× NBA All-Star (1965–1968, 1970, 1973, 1974); 2× NBA All-Defensive First Team (1969, 1971); 3× NBA All-Defensive Second Team (1972–1974); NBA All-Rookie First Team (1964); NBA anniversary team (50th, 75th); No. 42 retired by Golden State Warriors; No. 42 retired by Cleveland Cavaliers; Consensus second-team All-American (1963); 3× First-team All-MAC (1961–1963)

Career statistics
- Points: 14,437 (15.0 ppg)
- Rebounds: 14,464 (15.0 rpg)
- Assists: 2,575 (2.7 apg)
- Stats at NBA.com
- Stats at Basketball Reference
- Basketball Hall of Fame
- Collegiate Basketball Hall of Fame

Nathaniel Thurmond (July 25, 1941 – July 16, 2016) was an American professional basketball player who spent the majority of his 14-year career in the National Basketball Association (NBA) with the Golden State Warriors franchise. He played the center and power forward positions. Thurmond was a seven-time All-Star and the first player in NBA history to record an official quadruple-double. In 1965, he grabbed 42 rebounds in a game; only Wilt Chamberlain and Bill Russell recorded more rebounds in an NBA game. Thurmond was named a member of the Naismith Memorial Basketball Hall of Fame in 1985, one of the 50 Greatest Players in NBA History, and part of the NBA 75th Anniversary Team in 2021.

Known to fans as "Nate the Great", Thurmond had his No. 42 jersey retired by both the Golden State Warriors and the Cleveland Cavaliers.

== Early life and college ==
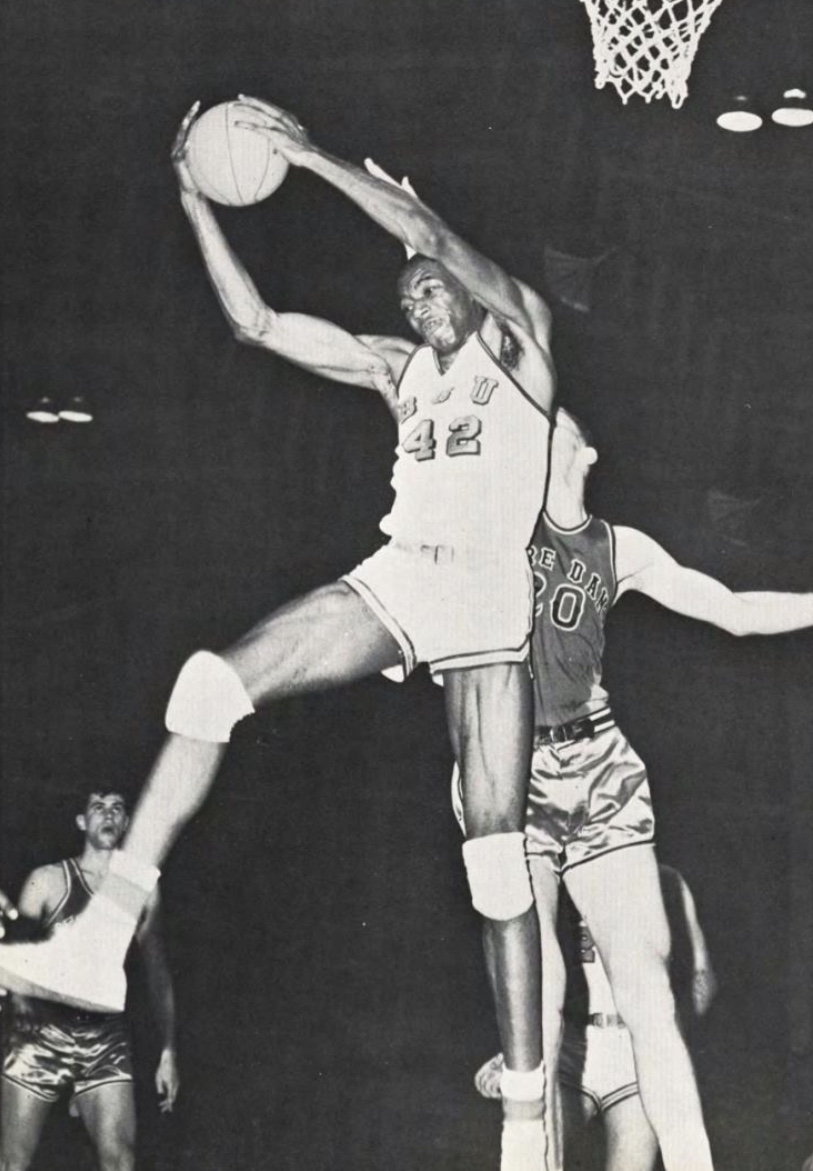
Thurmond grabbing a rebound while at Bowling Green

Thurmond started at Akron's Central High School, where he played alongside fellow future NBA star Gus Johnson. Passing up a scholarship offer from Ohio State to avoid becoming a backup to Jerry Lucas, a high school rival, Thurmond chose to play college basketball at Bowling Green.

Thurmond led the Mid-American Conference in rebounds during all three of his varsity seasons (with a college career average of 17.0 rebounds per game), and was named a first-team All-American by The Sporting News in 1963. In Thurmond's last two years with Bowling Green, he helped lead the team into the NCAA Tournament and he set a school record with 31 rebounds in his final college game.

== Professional career ==
=== San Francisco/Golden State Warriors ===
Thurmond was drafted 3rd overall by the San Francisco Warriors (now known as the Golden State Warriors) in the 1963 NBA draft. As a rookie, he mainly played a supporting role alongside Hall of Fame center Wilt Chamberlain. Thurmond averaged 7 points and 10.4 rebounds in his first NBA season and was named to the NBA All-Rookie Team in 1964.

After Chamberlain was traded to the Philadelphia 76ers during the next season, Thurmond blossomed into a highly productive starting center for the Warriors. Among his many accomplishments Thurmond set a regular-season record for rebounds in a quarter with 18, and averaged 21.3 and 22.0 rebounds per game in the 1966–67 and 1967–68 seasons. Thurmond placed second to Chamberlain in the MVP balloting in the 1966–67 season, averaged over 20 points per game each season from 1967–68 through 1971–72, and played in seven NBA All-Star Games as a member of the Warriors.

Thurmond also gained a fearsome defensive reputation in the NBA. Kareem Abdul-Jabbar called Thurmond the toughest defender he ever faced during his 20-season professional career. NBA All-Star center Bob Rule recalled Thurmond blocking six of his seven shots during the first half of their first encounter. After his coach urged him to "Keep putting 'em up. He can't block 'em all", Rule responded "Yeah, well if I hadn't made that layup it would have been all of 'em."

In spite of the contributions of star teammates like Rick Barry and Thurmond's stalwart play at center, the Warriors were unable to win a championship. They reached the 1967 NBA Finals, but lost to Chamberlain's 76ers.

=== Chicago Bulls ===
A 33-year-old Thurmond was acquired by the Chicago Bulls in exchange for Clifford Ray and $100,000 prior to the 1974–75 season on September 3, 1974. The Bulls had felt a need for one starting center rather than continue with a three-man rotation of Ray, Tom Boerwinkle and Dennis Awtrey. The Warriors added more fiscal stability when completing the deal. On October 18, 1974, against the Atlanta Hawks, in his debut as a Bull, he recorded 22 points, 14 rebounds, 13 assists and 12 blocked shots, becoming the first player in NBA history to officially record a quadruple-double (blocked shots were not counted before 1973–74).

=== Cleveland Cavaliers ===
Thirteen games into the 1975–76 season, Thurmond was traded along with Rowland Garrett to the Cleveland Cavaliers for Steve Patterson and Eric Fernsten on November 27, 1975. Thurmond's mobility on the court failed to mesh with an offense built for a more stationary center, resulting in diminished playing time on a team enduring a nine-game losing streak at the time of the deal. In Cleveland, the now 35-year-old Thurmond came off the bench for the injured Jim Chones to lead Cleveland's "Miracle at Richfield" team to the NBA Eastern Conference finals before the Cavaliers lost to the Boston Celtics in 1976.

A role player reduced to limited minutes and mid-single digit scoring and rebounds, Thurmond retired at the end of the 1976–77 season.

== Personal life ==
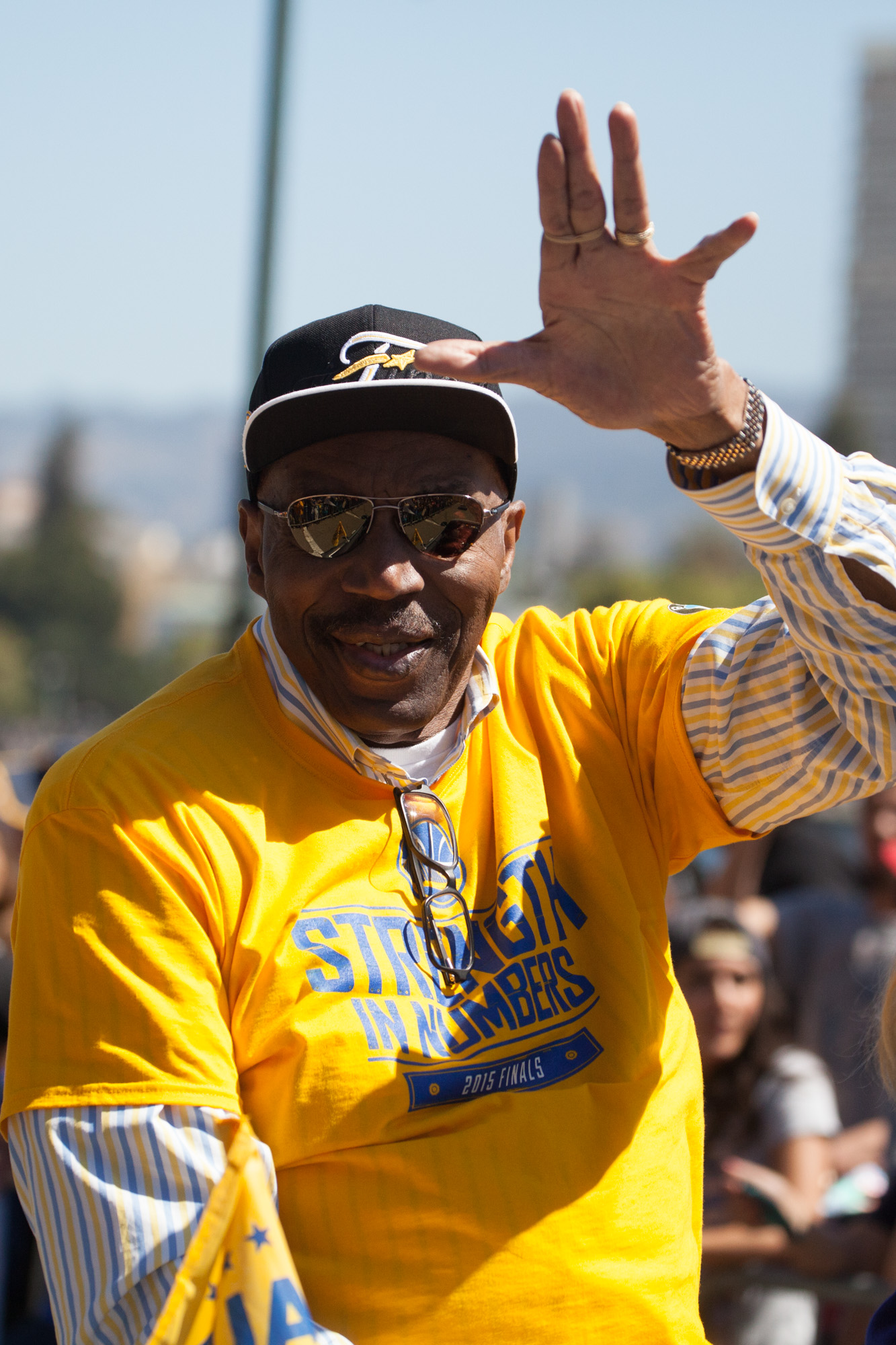
Thurmond at the Golden State Warriors victory parade in June 2015

After retirement, Thurmond returned to San Francisco and opened a restaurant, Big Nate's BBQ. He sold the restaurant after 20 years, while living in San Francisco with his wife, Marci. As of 2019, the Chase Center, home venue for the Golden State Warriors, features a Big Nate's BBQ kiosk with dishes that pay homage to his career.

He was given the title "Warriors Legend & Ambassador" by the Warriors organization.

Thurmond died on July 16, 2016, nine days away from his 75th birthday, after a short battle with leukemia. During the 2016–17 season, the Warriors paid homage to Thurmond by patching his number to their jerseys.

== Statistical accomplishments ==
First player in NBA history to record a quadruple-double in a game: Chicago Bulls (120) vs. Atlanta Hawks (115), October 18, 1974 (OT)

- 22 points, 14 rebounds, 13 assists, and 12 blocked shots
- The game was Thurmond's debut with the Chicago Bulls.
- Alvin Robertson, Hakeem Olajuwon and David Robinson are the only other players to achieve a quadruple-double. Blocked shots were not recorded prior to 1973-74

One of five players in NBA history to average at least 15 rebounds per game for his career: 15.0 (14,464/964)

- Also done by Wilt Chamberlain, Bill Russell, Bob Pettit and Jerry Lucas

One of five players in NBA history to average at least 20 rebounds per game during a season: 21.3 (1966–67), 22.0 (1967–68)

- Also achieved by Bill Russell, Wilt Chamberlain, Bob Pettit and Jerry Lucas

One of four players in NBA history to record 40 or more rebounds in a game: 42, vs. Detroit Pistons, November 9, 1965

- Also achieved by Bill Russell, Wilt Chamberlain and Jerry Lucas

NBA regular season record for rebounds in a quarter: 18, at Baltimore Bullets, February 28, 1965

== NBA career statistics ==
Legend
GP	Games played	GS	Games started	MPG	Minutes per game
FG%	Field goal percentage	3P%	3-point field goal percentage	FT%	Free throw percentage
RPG	Rebounds per game	APG	Assists per game	SPG	Steals per game
BPG	Blocks per game	PPG	Points per game	**Bold**	Career high

=== Regular season ===
Year	Team	GP	GS	MPG	FG%	3P%	FT%	RPG	APG	SPG	BPG	PPG
1963–64	San Francisco	76	—	25.9	.395	—	.549	10.4	1.1	—	—	7.0
1964–65	San Francisco	77	—	41.2	.419	—	.658	18.1	2.0	—	—	16.5
1965–66	San Francisco	73	—	39.6	.406	—	.654	18.0	1.5	—	—	16.3
1966–67	San Francisco	65	—	42.5	.437	—	.629	21.3	2.6	—	—	18.7
1967–68	San Francisco	51	—	43.6	.411	—	.644	**22.0**	**4.2**	—	—	20.5
1968–69	San Francisco	71	—	**45.2**	.410	—	.615	19.7	3.6	—	—	21.5
1969–70	San Francisco	43	—	44.6	.414	—	**.754**	17.7	3.5	—	—	**21.9**
1970–71	San Francisco	**82**	—	40.9	.445	—	.730	13.8	3.1	—	—	20.0
1971–72	Golden State	78	—	43.1	.432	—	.743	16.1	2.9	—	—	21.4
1972–73	Golden State	79	—	43.3	**.446**	—	.718	17.1	3.5	—	—	17.1
1973–74	Golden State	62	—	39.7	.444	—	.666	14.2	2.7	**.7**	**2.9**	13.0
1974–75	Chicago	80	—	34.5	.364	—	.589	11.3	4.1	.6	2.4	7.9
1975–76	Chicago	13	—	20.0	.444	—	.444	5.5	2.0	.3	.9	3.7
1975–76	Cleveland	65	—	17.4	.418	—	.514	5.3	1.0	.3	1.3	4.6
1976–77	Cleveland	49	—	20.3	.407	—	.642	7.6	1.7	.3	1.7	5.5
Career		964	—	37.2	.421	—	.667	15.0	2.7	.5	2.1	15.0
All-Star		5	2	20.8	.326	—	.375	8.8	.4	.0	.0	6.2

=== Playoffs ===
Year	Team	GP	GS	MPG	FG%	3P%	FT%	RPG	APG	SPG	BPG	PPG
1964	San Francisco	12	—	34.2	.438	—	.679	12.3	.8	—	—	10.0
1967	San Francisco	**15**	—	**46.0**	.433	—	.571	**23.1**	3.1	—	—	15.9
1969	San Francisco	6	—	43.8	.392	—	.588	19.5	4.7	—	—	16.7
1971	San Francisco	5	—	38.4	.371	—	**.800**	10.2	3.0	—	—	17.6
1972	Golden State	5	—	**46.0**	.434	—	.750	17.8	**5.2**	—	—	**25.4**
1973	Golden State	11	—	41.8	.398	—	**.800**	13.2	3.6	—	—	14.5
1975	Chicago	13	—	19.5	.368	—	.486	6.7	2.4	.4	1.6	3.5
1976	Cleveland	13	—	28.8	**.468**	—	.406	9.0	2.2	**.5**	**2.2**	6.7
1977	Cleveland	1	—	1.0	—	—	—	1.0	.0	.0	1.0	.0
Career		81	—	35.5	.416	—	.621	13.6	2.8	.4	1.9	11.9

== See also ==
- List of National Basketball Association career rebounding leaders
- List of National Basketball Association players with most rebounds in a game
- List of National Basketball Association players with most blocks in a game
- List of National Basketball Association single-season rebounding leaders
- Bay Area Sports Hall of Fame
