= Carlos C. Ogden =

United States Army officer

- Born: May 9, 1917; Borton, Illinois, US
- Died: April 2, 2001 (aged 83); Palo Alto, California
- Burial place: Arlington National Cemetery
- Spouse: Louise
- Children: 4, including Bud and Ralph
- Military career
- Allegiance: United States
- Branch: United States Army
- Service years: 1941 – 1947
- Rank: Major
- Units: 3rd Battalion, 314th Infantry Regiment, 79th Infantry Division
- Conflicts: World War II
- Awards: Medal of Honor; Bronze Star; Purple Heart (4)

Carlos Carnes Ogden, Sr. (May 9, 1917 – April 2, 2001) was a United States Army officer and a recipient of the United States military's highest decoration — the Medal of Honor — for his actions in World War II. Ogden attended Eastern Illinois University, where he was a standout on the Panthers’ football and basketball teams in the late 1930s.

== Biography ==
Ogden joined the Army from Fairmount, Illinois in April 1941, and by June 25, 1944, was serving as a first lieutenant in Company K, 314th Infantry Regiment, 79th Infantry Division. During a firefight on that day, near Fort du Roule, France, Ogden single-handedly destroyed three German gun emplacements. For his actions, he was awarded the Medal of Honor one year later, on June 28, 1945. Ogden reached the rank of major before leaving the Army in 1947.

After the war, Ogden married Louise Sanford, with whom he had four sons. Ogden spent much of his post-war life participating in Cub Scouts, Boy Scouts and a variety of youth sports leagues, but never forgot his military roots. In 1956, he went to France as a member of the official U.S. delegation to attend the dedication of the Normandy American Cemetery and Memorial. Two years later, at the invitation of President Dwight D. Eisenhower, he served as an honorary pallbearer at the internment of the World War II and Korea Unknown service members at Arlington National Cemetery. Ogden was also invited in 1964 to serve as one of 15 people from the U.S. to attend France's 20th anniversary commemoration of the Invasion of Normandy.

Ogden died at age 83 and was buried in Arlington National Cemetery, Arlington County, Virginia. He was posthumously recognized as a Distinguished Alumni Award recipient by the EIU Alumni Association in 2004, being represented at the ceremony by his wife Louise.

== Medal of Honor citation ==
Ogden's official Medal of Honor citation reads:

On the morning of June 25, 1944, near Fort du Roule, guarding the approaches to Cherbourg, France, 1st Lt. Ogden's company was pinned down by fire from a German 88-mm. gun and 2 machineguns. Arming himself with an M-1 rifle, a grenade launcher, and a number of rifle and hand grenades, he left his company in position and advanced alone, under fire, up the slope toward the enemy emplacements. Struck on the head and knocked down by a glancing machinegun bullet, 1st Lt. Ogden, in spite of his painful wound and enemy fire from close range, continued up the hill. Reaching a vantage point, he silenced the 88mm. gun with a well-placed rifle grenade and then, with handgrenades, knocked out the 2 machineguns, again being painfully wounded. 1st Lt. Ogden's heroic leadership and indomitable courage in alone silencing these enemy weapons inspired his men to greater effort and cleared the way for the company to continue the advance and reach its objectives.

== Awards and decorations ==

Badge	Combat Infantryman Badge		
1st row	Medal of Honor		
2nd row	Bronze Star Medal	Purple Heart with 3 Oak leaf clusters	American Defense Service Medal
3rd row	American Campaign Medal	European–African–Middle Eastern Campaign Medal with 1 Campaign star	World War II Victory Medal

== See also ==
- List of Medal of Honor recipients
- List of Medal of Honor recipients for World War II
