= 1970–71 San Francisco Warriors season =

NBA professional basketball team season

- Head coach: Al Attles
- Arena: Cow Palace

Results
- Record: 41–41 (.500)
- Place: Division: 2nd (Pacific); Conference: 4th (Western)
- Playoff finish: West Conference semifinals (lost to Bucks 1–4)
- Stats at Basketball Reference

The 1970–71 San Francisco Warriors season was the Warriors' 25th season in the NBA and ninth in the San Francisco Bay Area.

It was also the franchise's final season in San Francisco before relocating across the Bay to Oakland the following season. The team would not play in San Francisco full time until the 2019–20 NBA season.

== Offseason ==
=== Draft picks ===
| Round | Pick | Player | Position | Nationality | College |
|---|---|---|---|---|---|
| 3 | 36 | Earle Higgins | F | United States | Eastern Michigan |
| 4 | 53 | Ralph Ogden | F | United States | Santa Clara |
| 5 | 70 | Levi Fontaine | G | United States | Maryland Eastern Shore |
| 6 | 87 | Vic Bartolome | C | United States | Oregon State |
| 7 | 104 | Joe Bergman | F | United States | Creighton |
| 8 | 121 | Jeff Sewell | | United States | Marquette |
| 9 | 138 | Lou Small | | United States | Nevada |
| 10 | 155 | Coby Dietrick | C/F | United States | San José State |

== Roster ==
1970–71 San Francisco Warriors roster
Players

| Pos. | No. | Player | Height | Weight | DOB | From |
|---|---|---|---|---|---|---|
| G | 16 | Al Attles | 6 ft 0 in (1.83 m) | 175 lb (79 kg) | | North Carolina A&T |
| F | 31 | Joe Ellis | 6 ft 6 in (1.98 m) | 175 lb (79 kg) | | San Francisco |
| G | 12 | Levi Fontaine | 6 ft 4 in (1.93 m) | 190 lb (86 kg) | | Maryland Eastern Shore |
| G | 15 | Nick Jones | 6 ft 2 in (1.88 m) | 190 lb (86 kg) | | Oregon |
| F/C | 43 | Clyde Lee | 6 ft 10 in (2.08 m) | 205 lb (93 kg) | | Vanderbilt |
| F/C | 32 | Jerry Lucas | 6 ft 8 in (2.03 m) | 230 lb (104 kg) | | Ohio State |
| G | 23 | Jeff Mullins | 6 ft 4 in (1.93 m) | 190 lb (86 kg) | | Duke |
| F | 22 | Ralph Ogden | 6 ft 5 in (1.96 m) | 205 lb (93 kg) | | Santa Clara |
| G/F | 33 | Bob Portman | 6 ft 5 in (1.96 m) | 200 lb (91 kg) | | Creighton |
| G | 10 | Adrian Smith | 6 ft 1 in (1.85 m) | 180 lb (82 kg) | | Kentucky |
| F/C | 42 | Nate Thurmond | 6 ft 11 in (2.11 m) | 225 lb (102 kg) | | Bowling Green |
| F | 34 | Bill Turner | 6 ft 7 in (2.01 m) | 220 lb (100 kg) | | Akron |
| G | 21 | Ron Williams | 6 ft 3 in (1.91 m) | 188 lb (85 kg) | | West Virginia |

Coaches
Head coach
- Al Attles (North Carolina A&T)

Legend
- (DP) Unsigned draft pick
- (FA) Free agent
- (S) Suspended
- Injured

== Regular season ==
=== Season standings ===
| Pacific Division | W | L | PCT | GB | Home | Road | Neutral | Div |
|---|---|---|---|---|---|---|---|---|
| y-Los Angeles Lakers | 48 | 34 | .585 | – | 30–11 | 17–22 | 1–1 | 15–7 |
| x-San Francisco Warriors | 41 | 41 | .500 | 7 | 20–18 | 19–21 | 2–2 | 12–10 |
| San Diego Rockets | 40 | 42 | .488 | 8 | 24–15 | 15–26 | 1–1 | 14–8 |
| Seattle SuperSonics | 38 | 44 | .463 | 10 | 27–13 | 11–30 | 0–1 | 10–14 |
| Portland Trail Blazers | 29 | 53 | .354 | 19 | 18–21 | 9–26 | 2–6 | 3–15 |

| # | Western Conference | | | |
| # | Team | W | L | PCT |
|---|---|---|---|---|
| 1 | z-Milwaukee Bucks | 66 | 16 | .805 |
| 2 | y-Los Angeles Lakers | 48 | 34 | .585 |
| 3 | x-Chicago Bulls | 51 | 31 | .622 |
| 4 | x-San Francisco Warriors | 41 | 41 | .500 |
| 5 | Phoenix Suns | 48 | 34 | .585 |
| 6 | Detroit Pistons | 45 | 37 | .549 |
| 7 | San Diego Rockets | 40 | 42 | .488 |
| 8 | Seattle SuperSonics | 38 | 44 | .463 |
| 9 | Portland Trail Blazers | 29 | 53 | .354 |

z – clinched division title
y – clinched division title
x – clinched playoff spot

=== Game log ===
1970–71 game log
| # | Date | Opponent | Score | High points | Record |
| 1 | October 16 | Detroit | 120–106 | Jerry Lucas (31) | 0–1 |
| 2 | October 17 | Cleveland | 108–128 | Jerry Lucas (30) | 1–1 |
| 3 | October 20 | @ Baltimore | 125–105 | Jerry Lucas (33) | 2–1 |
| 4 | October 21 | @ Atlanta | 100–102 | Jeff Mullins (19) | 2–2 |
| 5 | October 22 | @ New York | 92–95 | Nate Thurmond (20) | 2–3 |
| 6 | October 24 | Portland | 115–118 | Ellis, Lucas (26) | 3–3 |
| 7 | October 28 | Philadelphia | 111–108 | Jeff Mullins (32) | 3–4 |
| 8 | October 30 | Chicago | 101–98 | Jeff Mullins (23) | 3–5 |
| 9 | November 2 | New York | 111–99 | Jerry Lucas (20) | 3–6 |
| 10 | November 4 | Baltimore | 100–111 | Jeff Mullins (35) | 4–6 |
| 11 | November 6 | @ Portland | 110–103 | Jeff Mullins (32) | 5–6 |
| 12 | November 7 | San Diego | 102–114 | Joe Ellis (21) | 6–6 |
| 13 | November 10 | Cleveland | 74–109 | Ron Williams (22) | 7–6 |
| 14 | November 12 | Cincinnati | 121–107 | Jerry Lucas (24) | 7–7 |
| 15 | November 13 | @ San Diego | 107–102 | Jeff Mullins (24) | 8–7 |
| 16 | November 16 | @ Milwaukee | 100–119 | Nate Thurmond (25) | 8–8 |
| 17 | November 17 | @ Chicago | 111–105 | Ron Williams (28) | 9–8 |
| 18 | November 18 | @ Boston | 90–89 | Jeff Mullins (30) | 10–8 |
| 19 | November 20 | Buffalo | 108–123 | Adrian Smith (23) | 11–8 |
| 20 | November 21 | Milwaukee | 127–102 | Nate Thurmond (30) | 11–9 |
| 21 | November 24 | @ Philadelphia | 104–96 | Jeff Mullins (28) | 12–9 |
| 22 | November 25 | @ Cleveland | 108–99 | Jeff Mullins (25) | 13–9 |
| 23 | November 27 | @ Seattle | 96–101 | Jerry Lucas (27) | 13–10 |
| 24 | November 28 | Los Angeles | 88–92 | Lucas, Thurmond (27) | 14–10 |
| 25 | December 1 | Atlanta | 106–113 | Jeff Mullins (34) | 15–10 |
| 26 | December 4 | @ Los Angeles | 101–123 | Mullins, Thurmond (16) | 15–11 |
| 27 | December 5 | Phoenix | 105–100 | Jerry Lucas (28) | 15–12 |
| 28 | December 7 | N Cincinnati | 113–124 | Ron Williams (28) | 15–13 |
| 29 | December 8 | @ Chicago | 87–98 | Ron Williams (23) | 15–14 |
| 30 | December 9 | @ Detroit | 110–99 | Lucas, Mullins (27) | 16–14 |
| 31 | December 11 | @ Philadelphia | 102–101 | Ron Williams (26) | 17–14 |
| 32 | December 12 | @ Baltimore | 96–119 | Nate Thurmond (21) | 17–15 |
| 33 | December 13 | N New York | 101–94 | Jeff Mullins (22) | 18–15 |
| 34 | December 15 | @ Phoenix | 129–123 | Jerry Lucas (26) | 19–15 |
| 35 | December 16 | Seattle | 91–108 | Jerry Lucas (29) | 20–15 |
| 36 | December 18 | N Portland | 122–118 | Jerry Lucas (32) | 21–15 |
| 37 | December 19 | Philadelphia | 108–99 | Nate Thurmond (22) | 21–16 |
| 38 | December 22 | Boston | 138–108 | Nate Thurmond (35) | 21–17 |
| 39 | December 26 | @ Milwaukee | 111–131 | Nate Thurmond (25) | 21–18 |
| 40 | December 28 | @ Atlanta | 115–104 | Nate Thurmond (30) | 22–18 |
| 41 | December 30 | @ New York | 103–111 | Ron Williams (26) | 22–19 |
| 42 | December 31 | @ Boston | 144–106 | Mullins, Thurmond (32) | 23–19 |
| 43 | January 2 | Phoenix | 122–116 (OT) | Jerry Lucas (26) | 23–20 |
| 44 | January 3 | @ Phoenix | 81–102 | Nate Thurmond (26) | 23–21 |
| 45 | January 5 | @ Philadelphia | 92–97 | Nate Thurmond (28) | 23–22 |
| 46 | January 6 | @ Buffalo | 108–115 | Lee, Lucas (25) | 23–23 |
| 47 | January 8 | @ San Diego | 120–117 | Thurmond, Williams (26) | 24–23 |
| 48 | January 9 | San Diego | 103–109 | Jeff Mullins (25) | 25–23 |
| 49 | January 16 | New York | 93–102 | Ron Williams (23) | 26–23 |
| 50 | January 19 | Cincinnati | 108–116 | Nate Thurmond (28) | 27–23 |
| 51 | January 22 | @ Los Angeles | 110–130 | Nate Thurmond (20) | 27–24 |
| 52 | January 23 | Chicago | 87–83 | Nate Thurmond (25) | 27–25 |
| 53 | January 26 | @ Baltimore | 98–103 | Nate Thurmond (23) | 27–26 |
| 54 | January 27 | @ Detroit | 129–112 | Ron Williams (34) | 28–26 |
| 55 | January 29 | Buffalo | 100–106 | Lucas, Portman (20) | 29–26 |
| 56 | January 30 | Los Angeles | 85–87 | Ron Williams (24) | 30–26 |
| 57 | February 2 | Atlanta | 99–101 | Jeff Mullins (26) | 31–26 |
| 58 | February 4 | @ Phoenix | 117–105 | Nate Thurmond (30) | 32–26 |
| 59 | February 5 | @ Portland | 117–123 | Jeff Mullins (27) | 32–27 |
| 60 | February 6 | Milwaukee | 111–85 | Jerry Lucas (17) | 32–28 |
| 61 | February 7 | @ Los Angeles | 104–119 | Nate Thurmond (24) | 32–29 |
| 62 | February 10 | Seattle | 122–133 | Nick Jones (28) | 33–29 |
| 63 | February 11 | @ San Diego | 111–119 | Nate Thurmond (29) | 33–30 |
| 64 | February 12 | Cincinnati | 119–133 | Jerry Lucas (29) | 34–30 |
| 65 | February 14 | @ Seattle | 101–146 | Nick Jones (16) | 34–31 |
| 66 | February 17 | Boston | 129–99 | Jeff Mullins (19) | 34–32 |
| 67 | February 19 | San Diego | 109–103 | Nate Thurmond (29) | 34–33 |
| 68 | February 20 | Milwaukee | 104–96 | Nate Thurmond (30) | 34–34 |
| 69 | February 22 | @ Buffalo | 109–91 | Lucas, Thurmond (28) | 35–34 |
| 70 | February 23 | @ Milwaukee | 107–118 | Nick Jones (31) | 35–35 |
| 71 | February 24 | @ Detroit | 117–115 | Nate Thurmond (43) | 36–35 |
| 72 | February 27 | Los Angeles | 112–107 | Nate Thurmond (37) | 36–36 |
| 73 | March 3 | Atlanta | 109–105 | Nate Thurmond (25) | 36–37 |
| 74 | March 5 | N Chicago | 103–130 | Jerry Lucas (21) | 36–38 |
| 75 | March 6 | Baltimore | 103–109 | Jerry Lucas (30) | 37–38 |
| 76 | March 9 | Boston | 134–112 | Nate Thurmond (35) | 37–39 |
| 77 | March 12 | Seattle | 98–111 | Jeff Mullins (30) | 38–39 |
| 78 | March 13 | Detroit | 107–116 | Jeff Mullins (37) | 39–39 |
| 79 | March 16 | @ Cleveland | 103–108 | Jeff Mullins (34) | 39–40 |
| 80 | March 17 | @ Cincinnati | 110–92 | Jeff Mullins (30) | 40–40 |
| 81 | March 18 | @ Chicago | 91–85 | Mullins, Thurmond (29) | 41–40 |
| 82 | March 21 | @ Seattle | 106–119 | Ron Williams (23) | 41–41 |

== Playoffs ==
1971 playoff game log
Conference semifinals: 1–4 (home: 1–1; road: 0–3)

| Game | Date | Team | Score | High points | High rebounds | High assists | Location Attendance | Series |
|---|---|---|---|---|---|---|---|---|
| 1 | March 27 | Milwaukee | L 96–107 | Jeff Mullins (30) | Nate Thurmond (15) | Jeff Mullins (7) | Oakland–Alameda County Coliseum Arena; 11,216 | 0–1 |
| 2 | March 29 | @ Milwaukee | L 90–104 | Nate Thurmond (18) | Clyde Lee (13) | Mullins, Williams (4) | University of Wisconsin Field House; 12,868 | 0–2 |
| 3 | March 30 | @ Milwaukee | L 102–114 | Jerry Lucas (25) | Jerry Lucas (20) | Ron Williams (8) | University of Wisconsin Field House; 12,868 | 0–3 |
| 4 | April 1 | Milwaukee | W 106–104 | Jerry Lucas (32) | Jeff Mullins (19) | Ron Williams (9) | Oakland–Alameda County Coliseum Arena; 7,615 | 1–3 |
| 5 | April 4 | @ Milwaukee | L 86–136 | Ron Williams (13) | Clyde Lee (11) | Mullins, Williams (4) | University of Wisconsin Field House; 12,868 | 1–4 |

1971 schedule

== Awards and records ==
- Jerry Lucas, NBA All-Star Game
- Nate Thurmond, NBA All-Defensive First Team
