= List of NBA single-season rebounding leaders =

This list exhibits the National Basketball Association's top single-season rebounding averages based on at least 70 games played or 800 rebounds. The NBA did not record rebounds until the 1950–51 season.

Statistics accurate as of the 2025–26 NBA season.

== All-time ==
^	Active NBA player
*	Inducted into the Naismith Memorial Basketball Hall of Fame

Rank	Season	Player	Team	Games	Rebounds	RPG
1	1960–61	Wilt Chamberlain*	Philadelphia Warriors	79	2,149	27.2
2	1959–60	Wilt Chamberlain* (2)	Philadelphia Warriors	72	1,941	27.0
3	1961–62	Wilt Chamberlain* (3)	Philadelphia Warriors	80	2,052	25.7
4	1963–64	Bill Russell*	Boston Celtics	78	1,930	24.7
5	1965–66	Wilt Chamberlain* (4)	Philadelphia 76ers	79	1,943	24.6
6	1962–63	Wilt Chamberlain* (5)	San Francisco Warriors	80	1,946	24.3
7	1966–67	Wilt Chamberlain* (6)	Philadelphia 76ers	81	1,957	24.2
8	1964–65	Bill Russell* (2)	Boston Celtics	78	1,878	24.1
9	1959–60	Bill Russell* (3)	Boston Celtics	74	1,778	24.0
10	1960–61	Bill Russell* (4)	Boston Celtics	78	1,868	24.0
11	1967–68	Wilt Chamberlain* (7)	Philadelphia 76ers	82	1,952	23.8
12	1962–63	Bill Russell* (5)	Boston Celtics	78	1,843	23.6
13	1961–62	Bill Russell* (6)	Boston Celtics	76	1,790	23.6
14	1958–59	Bill Russell* (7)	Boston Celtics	70	1,612	23.0
15	1964–65	Wilt Chamberlain* (8)	Warriors/76ers	73	1,673	22.9
16	1965–66	Bill Russell* (8)	Boston Celtics	78	1,779	22.8
17	1957–58	Bill Russell* (9)	Boston Celtics	69	1,564	22.7
18	1963–64	Wilt Chamberlain* (9)	San Francisco Warriors	80	1,787	22.3
19	1967–68	Nate Thurmond*	San Francisco Warriors	51	1,121	22.0
20	1966–67	Nate Thurmond* (2)	San Francisco Warriors	65	1,382	21.3
21	1968–69	Wilt Chamberlain* (10)	Los Angeles Lakers	81	1,712	21.1
22	1965–66	Jerry Lucas*	Cincinnati Royals	79	1,668	21.1
23	1966–67	Bill Russell* (10)	Boston Celtics	81	1,700	21.0
24	1960–61	Bob Pettit*	St. Louis Hawks	76	1,540	20.3
25	1964–65	Jerry Lucas* (2)	Cincinnati Royals	66	1,321	20.0

== See also ==
- National Basketball Association
