= Abraham Lincoln High School (San Jose, California) =

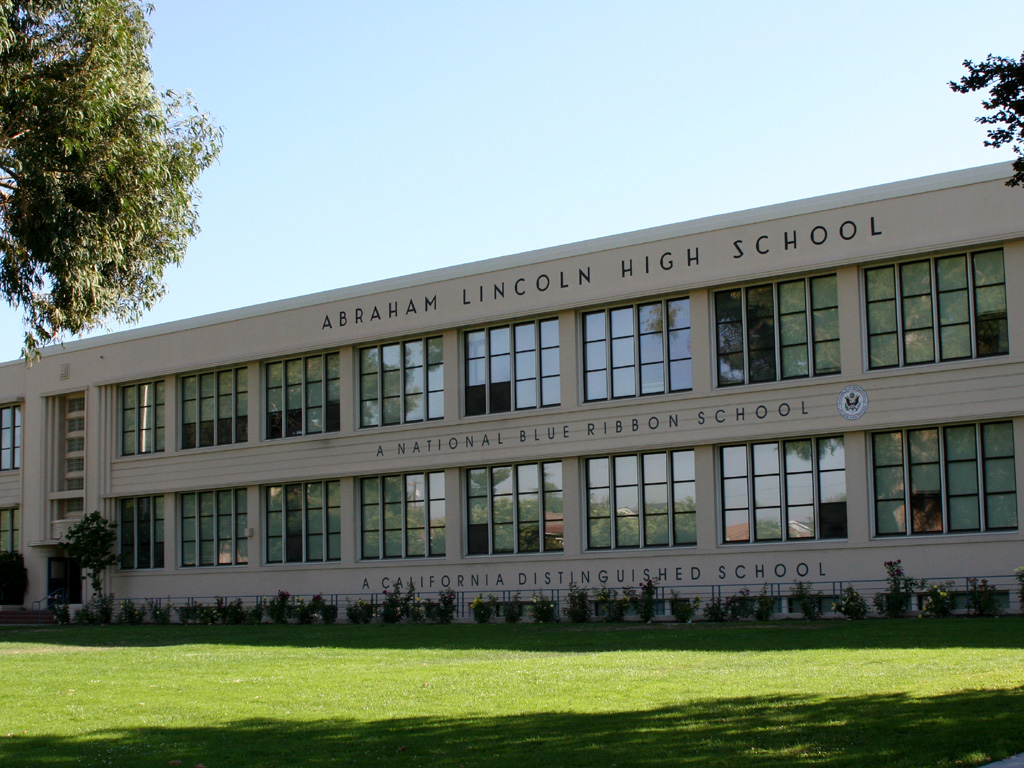

Location
- 555 Dana Avenue; San Jose, California 95126; United States; 37°19′42″N 121°55′25″W

Information
- Type: Public
- Motto: DO RIGHT!
- Established: 1942
- School district: San Jose Unified School District
- Principal: Aaron Lilly
- Teaching staff: 73.50 (FTE)
- Grades: 9-12
- Enrollment: 1,596 (2023–2024) (2025-2026)
- Student to teacher ratio: 21.71
- Colors: Navy blue and gold
- Mascot: Leo the Lion
- Nickname: Lions
- Newspaper: Lincoln Lion Tales
- Website: lincoln.sjusd.org

Abraham Lincoln High School is a high school located in San Jose, California, in the San Jose Unified School District. It is a magnet school for academic, visual, and performing arts. As of 2025, the principal is Aaron Lilly, after controversy between the staff.

== Activities ==
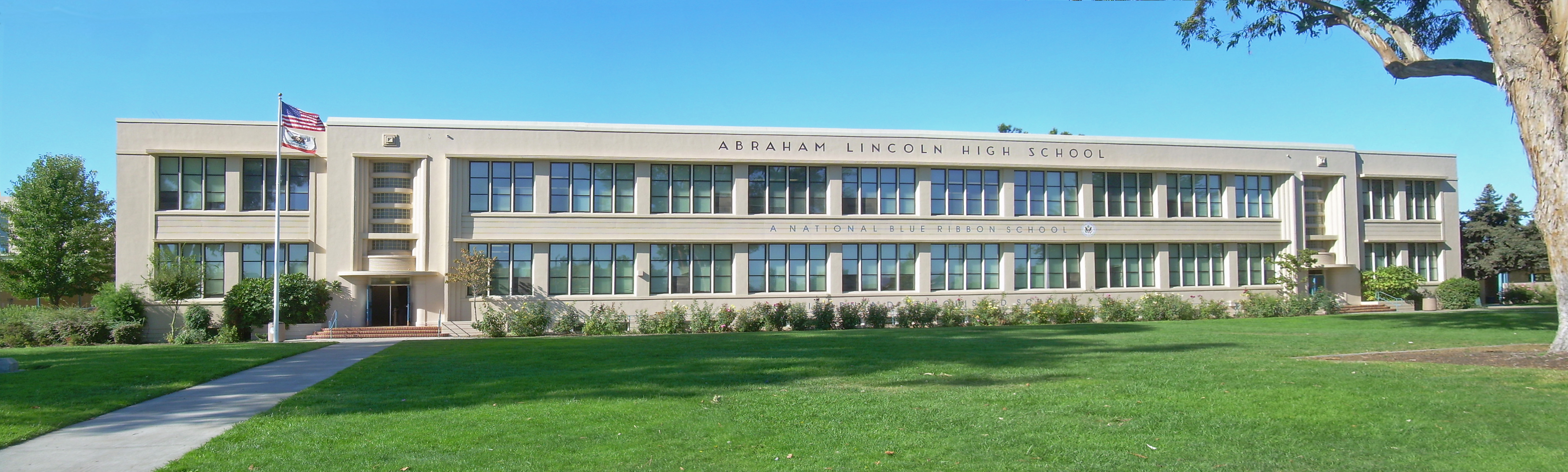
Abraham Lincoln High School

Lincoln offers various extracurricular activities.

== Athletics ==
The school mascot is a Lion. The school colors are blue and gold.

The track and field is named after Don Bowden, a Lincoln High School student who went on to the Olympics and was the first American to beat the 4-minute mile.

The school plays football in BVAL (Blossom Valley Athletic League).

== Notable alumni ==
- Don Bowden, an Olympic runner and the first American to break the 4-minute mile
- Courtney Bryan, professional American football player
- Lorna Dee Cervantes, poet
- Bob Bowman (outfielder), former Major League Baseball player for Philadelphia Phillies
- Megan Dirkmaat, 2004 Summer Olympics silver medalist rowing
- Shamako Noble, hip-hop artist and political activist
- Bud Ogden, professional basketball player
- Ralph Ogden, professional basketball player
- Anjelah Johnson, American actress, stand-up comedian
- Ryan Karazija, American singer-songwriter
- Anohni, British singer-songwriter
- Kyle Smith, professional soccer player
