= Roy Lucas (American football) =

American football coach (1941–2019)

Biographical details
- Born: September 6, 1941; Middletown, Ohio, U.S.
- Died: August 26, 2019 (aged 77); Edgewood, Kentucky, U.S.

Coaching career (HC unless noted)
- 1966-1969: Erlanger Lloyd Memorial High School (KY)
- 1970–1971: Miami Trace HS (OH)
- 1972–1975: Morehead State (assistant)
- 1976–1982: West Virginia Tech

Head coaching record
- Overall: 26–35–4 (college); 32–17 (high school)

Roy Lucas (September 6, 1941 – August 26, 2019) was an American football coach. He served as the head football at the West Virginia University Institute of Technology in Montgomery, West Virginia, from 1976 until 1982, compiling a record of 26–35–4. He is the younger brother of former National Basketball Association player Jerry Lucas. Lucas died on August 26, 2019, in Edgewood, Kentucky.
