= List of NBA single-game rebounding leaders =

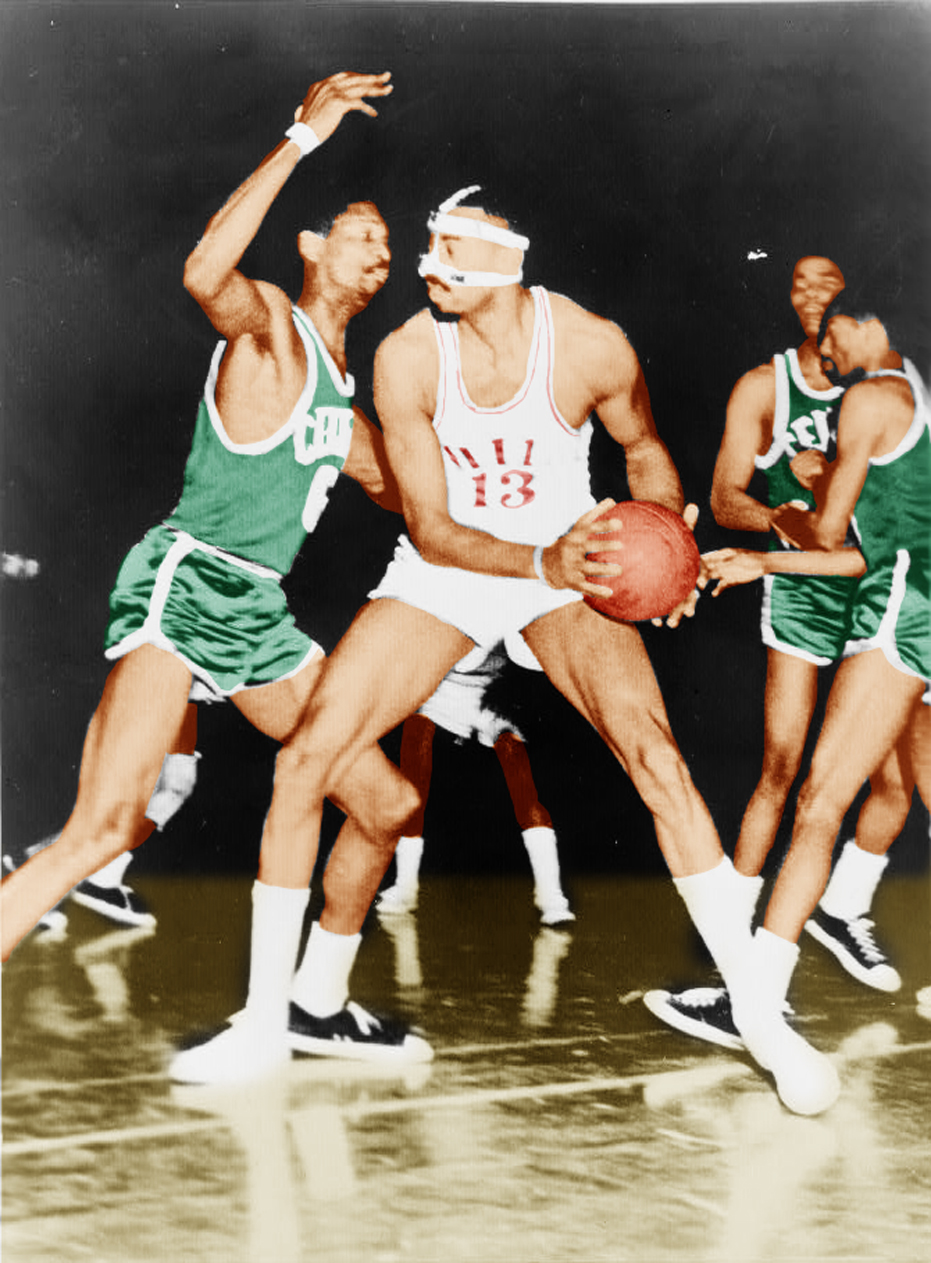
Wilt Chamberlain and Bill Russell constitute 26 of the 28 40-rebound games in NBA history.

This is a list of National Basketball Association players who have had 38 or more rebounds in a single game and a list of players who have had 30 or more rebounds in a single game since the NBA/ABA merger in 1976.

Multiple occurrences: Wilt Chamberlain 29 times (four times in the playoffs) and Bill Russell 23 times (seven times in the playoffs).

The NBA did not record rebounds until the 1950–51 season.

== Single-game leaders ==
Key
^	Active NBA players
*	Inducted into the Naismith Memorial Basketball Hall of Fame
§	1st time eligible for Hall of Fame in 2025
	Occurred in playoff competition

Single-game leaders
Rebounds	Player	Team	Date	Opponent	Notes
55	Wilt Chamberlain*	Philadelphia Warriors	November 24, 1960	Boston Celtics	Record set in a losing effort; grabbed 31 rebounds in one half; scored 34 points.
51	Bill Russell*	Boston Celtics	February 5, 1960	Syracuse Nationals	Set a then-record for rebounds in a game; set a still-standing record for rebounds in a winning effort.
49	Bill Russell* (2)	Boston Celtics	November 16, 1957	Philadelphia Warriors	Set a then-record for rebounds in a game; set a still-standing record of 32 rebounds in a single half.
49	Bill Russell* (3)	Boston Celtics	March 11, 1965	Detroit Pistons	
45	Wilt Chamberlain* (2)	Philadelphia Warriors	February 6, 1960	Syracuse Nationals	Single-game record for a rookie; scored 44 points; the fourth quadruple double-double in NBA history.
45	Wilt Chamberlain* (3)	Philadelphia Warriors	January 21, 1961	Los Angeles Lakers	Scored 56 points; the fifth quadruple double-double in NBA history.
43	Wilt Chamberlain* (4)	Philadelphia Warriors	November 10, 1959	New York Knicks	Set a then-record for a rookie; scored 39 points.
43	Wilt Chamberlain* (5)	Philadelphia Warriors	December 8, 1961	Los Angeles Lakers	Triple overtime; Chamberlain also scored a then-record 78 points in the game; the sixth quadruple double-double in NBA history.
43	Bill Russell* (4)	Boston Celtics	January 20, 1963	Los Angeles Lakers	
43	Wilt Chamberlain* (6)	Philadelphia 76ers	March 6, 1965	Boston Celtics	
42	Wilt Chamberlain* (7)	Philadelphia Warriors	January 15, 1960	Boston Celtics	Rookie season; scored 44 points; the second quadruple double-double in NBA history.
42	Wilt Chamberlain* (8)	Philadelphia Warriors	January 25, 1960	Detroit Pistons	Rookie season; Chamberlain also scored a rookie record 58 points in the same game; the third quadruple double-double in NBA history.
42	Nate Thurmond*	San Francisco Warriors	November 9, 1965	Detroit Pistons	
42	Wilt Chamberlain* (9)	Philadelphia 76ers	January 14, 1966	Boston Celtics	Scored 37 points.
42	Wilt Chamberlain* (10)	Los Angeles Lakers	March 7, 1969	Boston Celtics	Overtime.
41	Bill Russell* (5)	Boston Celtics	February 12, 1958	Syracuse Nationals	
41	Wilt Chamberlain* (11)	San Francisco Warriors	October 26, 1962	Detroit Pistons	Overtime; scored 50 points; the seventh quadruple double-double in NBA history.
41	Bill Russell* (6)	Boston Celtics	March 14, 1965	San Francisco Warriors	
41	Wilt Chamberlain* (12)	Philadelphia 76ers	April 5, 1967	Boston Celtics	Game 3 victory in the Eastern Division finals.
40	Bill Russell* (7)	Boston Celtics	March 23, 1958	Philadelphia Warriors	Game 3 victory in the Eastern Division finals.
40	Bill Russell* (8)	Boston Celtics	December 12, 1958	Cincinnati Royals	Overtime.
40	Wilt Chamberlain* (13)	Philadelphia Warriors	November 4, 1959	Syracuse Nationals	Set a then-record for a rookie; third game of career; scored 41 points; the first quadruple double-double in NBA history.
40	Bill Russell* (9)	Boston Celtics	March 29, 1960	St. Louis Hawks	NBA finals record (tie)
40	Bill Russell* (10)	Boston Celtics	February 12, 1961	Philadelphia Warriors	
40	Bill Russell* (11)	Boston Celtics	April 18, 1962	Los Angeles Lakers	NBA finals record (tie); game 7 overtime victory; Russell's 19 rebounds in a single quarter is the most of any NBA quarter — regular season or playoffs; scored 30 points.
40	Jerry Lucas*	Cincinnati Royals	February 29, 1964	Philadelphia 76ers	His rookie season.
40	Wilt Chamberlain* (14)	San Francisco Warriors	November 22, 1964	Detroit Pistons	Scored 50 points; the eighth and final quadruple double-double in NBA history.
40	Wilt Chamberlain* (15)	Philadelphia 76ers	December 28, 1965	Boston Celtics	Scored 31 points.
39	Neil Johnston*	Philadelphia Warriors	December 4, 1954	Syracuse Nationals	Set a then-record.
39	Bill Russell* (12)	Boston Celtics	January 25, 1959	Detroit Pistons	
39	Bill Russell* (13)	Boston Celtics	December 19, 1959	New York Knicks	
39	Wilt Chamberlain* (16)	Philadelphia Warriors	December 28, 1959	Cincinnati Royals	Rookie season; scored 39 points.
39	Wilt Chamberlain* (17)	Philadelphia Warriors	January 13, 1960	Syracuse Nationals	Rookie season; scored 42 points.
39	Wilt Chamberlain* (18)	Philadelphia Warriors	January 29, 1960	Boston Celtics	Rookie season; scored 43 points.
39	Bill Russell* (14)	Boston Celtics	March 19, 1960	Philadelphia Warriors	
39	Bill Russell* (15)	Boston Celtics	March 23, 1961	Syracuse Nationals	
39	Wilt Chamberlain* (19)	Philadelphia Warriors	November 4, 1961	Detroit Pistons	Scored 58 points.
39	Bill Russell* (16)	Boston Celtics	December 21, 1961	New York Knicks	
39	Wilt Chamberlain* (20)	Philadelphia 76ers	April 6, 1965	Boston Celtics	Scored 30 points.
38	Maurice Stokes*	Rochester Royals	January 14, 1956	Syracuse Nationals	Rookie season; triple-double, scored 26 points with 12 assists.
38	Bill Russell* (17)	Boston Celtics	February 23, 1958	Philadelphia Warriors	
38	Bill Russell* (18)	Boston Celtics	December 4, 1959	New York Knicks	
38	Wilt Chamberlain* (21)	Philadelphia Warriors	November 29, 1960	Los Angeles Lakers	Scored 44 points.
38	Wilt Chamberlain* (22)	Philadelphia Warriors	December 18, 1960	Cincinnati Royals	Scored 32 points.
38	Bill Russell* (19)	Boston Celtics	April 11, 1961	St. Louis Hawks	Scored 30 points
38	Wilt Chamberlain* (23)	Philadelphia Warriors	November 25, 1961	Chicago Packers	Scored 39 points.
38	Bill Russell* (20)	Boston Celtics	February 21, 1963	San Francisco Warriors	
38	Wilt Chamberlain* (24)	San Francisco Warriors	February 21, 1963	Boston Celtics	Scored 40 points.
38	Bill Russell* (21)	Boston Celtics	April 16, 1963	Los Angeles Lakers	
38	Wilt Chamberlain* (25)	San Francisco Warriors	April 24, 1964	Boston Celtics	
38	Bill Russell* (22)	Boston Celtics	January 30, 1965	New York Knicks	
38	Bill Russell* (23)	Boston Celtics	March 3, 1965	Los Angeles Lakers	
38	Wilt Chamberlain* (26)	Philadelphia 76ers	March 2, 1967	San Francisco Warriors	Triple-double, scored 24 points with 13 assists.
38	Wilt Chamberlain* (27)	Philadelphia 76ers	April 16, 1967	San Francisco Warriors	Triple-double, scored 10 points with 10 assists; 26 rebounds in one half, setting the NBA Playoffs record.
38	Wilt Chamberlain* (28)	Philadelphia 76ers	December 20, 1967	Seattle SuperSonics	Scored 53 points.
38	Wilt Chamberlain* (29)	Los Angeles Lakers	March 9, 1969	Baltimore Bullets	

== Since NBA/ABA merger (1976) ==
Single-game leaders
Rebounds	Player	Team	Date	Opponent	Notes
37	Moses Malone*	Houston Rockets	February 9, 1979	New Orleans Jazz	Scored 33 points.
35	Charles Oakley	Chicago Bulls	April 22, 1988	Cleveland Cavaliers	
34	Dennis Rodman*	Detroit Pistons	March 4, 1992	Indiana Pacers	Overtime.
34	Rony Seikaly	Miami Heat	March 3, 1993	Washington Bullets	
33	Swen Nater	Milwaukee Bucks	December 19, 1976	Atlanta Hawks	Scored 30 points.
33	Kevin Willis	Atlanta Hawks	February 19, 1992	Washington Bullets	Overtime.
33	Charles Barkley*	Houston Rockets	November 2, 1996	Phoenix Suns	
32	Robert Parish*	Golden State Warriors	March 30, 1979	New York Knicks	Scored 30 points.
32	Swen Nater (2)	San Diego Clippers	December 14, 1979	Denver Nuggets	
32	Moses Malone* (2)	Houston Rockets	February 11, 1982	Seattle SuperSonics	Scored 38 points.
32	Dennis Rodman* (2)	Detroit Pistons	January 28, 1992	Charlotte Hornets	Overtime.
32	Dennis Rodman* (3)	San Antonio Spurs	January 22, 1994	Dallas Mavericks	
31	Larry Smith	Golden State Warriors	March 28, 1981	Denver Nuggets	His rookie season.
31	Kevin Willis (2)	Atlanta Hawks	December 3, 1991	Dallas Mavericks	
31	Dennis Rodman* (4)	Detroit Pistons	March 14, 1992	Sacramento Kings	
31	Dikembe Mutombo*	Denver Nuggets	March 26, 1996	Charlotte Hornets	Double overtime.
31	Kevin Love^	Minnesota Timberwolves	November 12, 2010	New York Knicks	Scored 31 points; youngest player to record 30+ rebounds in a single game.
31	Jusuf Nurkić^	Phoenix Suns	March 3, 2024	Oklahoma City Thunder	
30	Kareem Abdul-Jabbar*	Los Angeles Lakers	February 3, 1978	New Jersey Nets	Overtime; scored 37 points.
30	Swen Nater (3)	Buffalo Braves	March 4, 1978	New Jersey Nets	
30	Michael Cage	Los Angeles Clippers	April 24, 1988	Seattle SuperSonics	
30	Dennis Rodman* (5)	San Antonio Spurs	February 21, 1995	Houston Rockets	
30	Andrew Bynum	Los Angeles Lakers	April 11, 2012	San Antonio Spurs	
30	Dwight Howard*	Charlotte Hornets	March 21, 2018	Brooklyn Nets	Scored 32 points.
30	Enes Kanter Freedom	Portland Trail Blazers	April 10, 2021	Detroit Pistons	

== See also ==
- NBA records
- List of NCAA Division I men's basketball players with 30 or more rebounds in a game
