= Fort du Roule =

Coordinates: 49.630583°N 1.613675°W

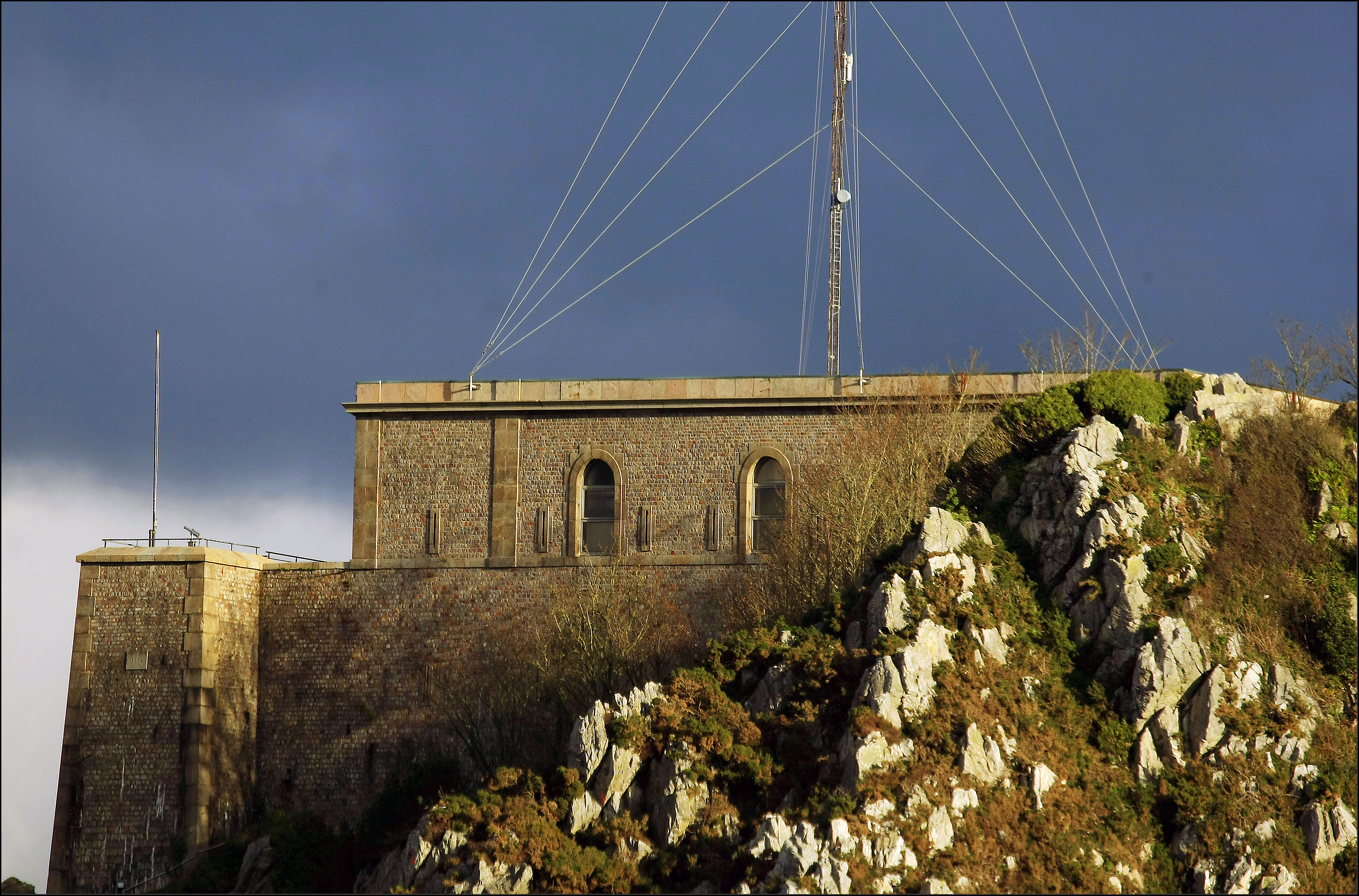
A Battery at the Fort du Roule.

The Fort du Roule is a collection of French and German fortifications built in the nineteenth and twentieth centuries on the Roule mountain in Cherbourg (Cherbourg-en-Cotentin since 2016).

The first fortifications were built in 1793 to protect the Bay of Cherbourg from English attacks. The current fort, at the top of the mountain, was built between 1853 and 1857 under Napoleon III. In 1928, the Navy built extensive tunnels under it to store equipment. During the Second World War, the Todt Organisation built several tunnels, installed casemates for artillery, and built gun emplacements. The fort was captured after fierce fighting by the U.S. Army on June 26, 1944.

After the war, the Navy took possession of the site and set up its command post in the first maritime region until 1988, when part of the site became a naval communications center. The School of Military Applications of Atomic Energy uses some of the facilities. The fortifications at the top of the mountain now house the Cherbourg Liberation Museum, and the tunnels leading to the German gun emplacements are open to the public.
