= Ron Williams (basketball) =

American basketball player (1944–2004)

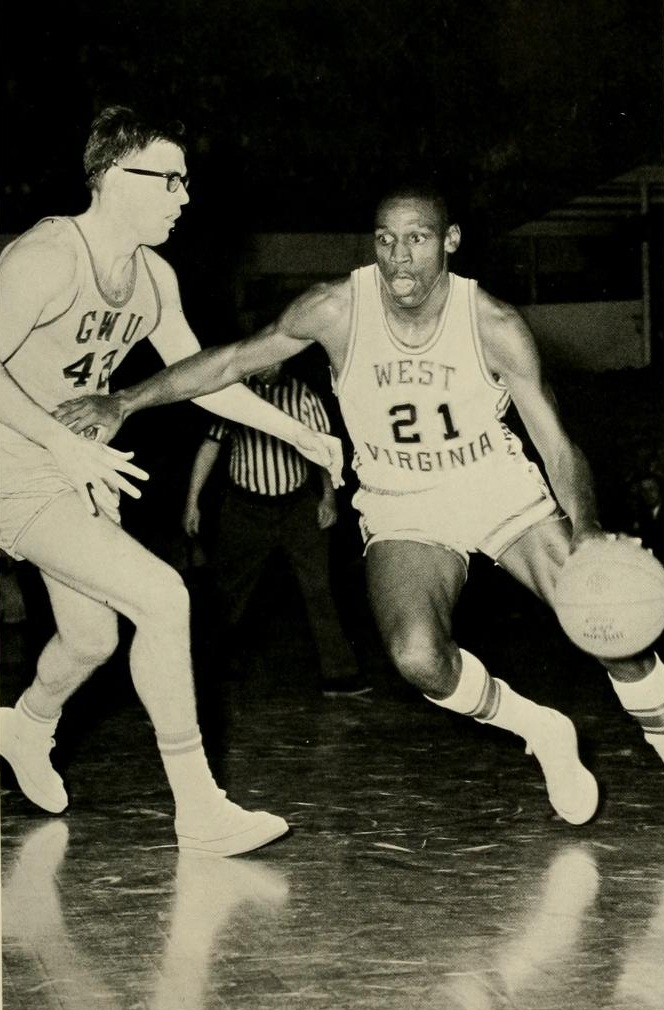
- Williams from The Monticola, 1966

Personal information
- Born: September 24, 1944 Weirton, West Virginia, U.S.
- Died: April 4, 2004 (aged 59) San Jose, California, U.S.
- Listed height: 6 ft 3 in (1.91 m)
- Listed weight: 188 lb (85 kg)

Career information
- High school: Weir (Weirton, West Virginia)
- College: West Virginia (1965–1968)
- NBA draft: 1968: 1st round, 9th overall pick
- Drafted by: San Francisco Warriors
- Playing career: 1968–1975
- Position: Point guard
- Number: 12, 21, 15

Career history
- 1968–1973: San Francisco / Golden State Warriors
- 1973–1975: Milwaukee Bucks
- 1975: Los Angeles Lakers

Career highlights
- SoCon Player of the Year (1968); Second-team Parade All-American (1964)

Career NBA statistics
- Points: 4,797 (9.3 ppg)
- Rebounds: 971 (1.9 rpg)
- Assists: 1,818 (3.5 apg)
- Stats at NBA.com
- Stats at Basketball Reference

Ronald Robert Williams (September 24, 1944 – April 4, 2004) was an American basketball player.

A 6'3" guard from Weirton, West Virginia, Williams starred at West Virginia University in the mid-1960s, where he was one of the school's first African American basketball players. He was selected by the San Francisco Warriors with the ninth pick of the 1968 NBA draft, and was also drafted as a defensive back by the Dallas Cowboys in the 14th round of the 1968 NFL/AFL draft. He played eight seasons in the NBA as a member of the Warriors, the Milwaukee Bucks, and the Los Angeles Lakers. Williams averaged 9.3 points and 3.5 assists per game in his professional career and ranked third in the league in free throw percentage during the 1970–71 NBA season.

After his playing career ended, Williams held several basketball coaching positions, including stints as an assistant coach at the University of California, Berkeley and Iona College. He died of a heart attack in 2004.

== Career statistics ==
Legend
GP	Games played	GS	Games started	MPG	Minutes per game
FG%	Field goal percentage	3P%	3-point field goal percentage	FT%	Free throw percentage
RPG	Rebounds per game	APG	Assists per game	SPG	Steals per game
BPG	Blocks per game	PPG	Points per game	**Bold**	Career high
*	Led the league

=== NBA ===
==== Regular season ====
Year	Team	GP	GS	MPG	FG%	3P%	FT%	RPG	APG	SPG	BPG	PPG
1968–69	San Francisco	75	–	19.6	.420	–	.768	2.4	3.3	–	–	7.8
1969–70	San Francisco	80	–	30.4	.432	–	.822	2.4	5.3	–	–	**14.8**
1970–71	San Francisco	**82**	–	**34.3**	.436	–	.844	**3.0**	**5.9**	–	–	14.4
1971–72	Golden State	80	–	24.2	.474	–	.833	1.8	3.9	–	–	9.7
1972–73	Golden State	73	–	13.9	.440	–	**.904**	1.1	1.6	–	–	6.0
1973–74	Milwaukee	71	–	15.9	**.489**	–	.882	1.0	2.2	**0.7**	0.0	6.3
1974–75	Milwaukee	46	–	11.4	.376	–	.828	0.9	1.5	0.5	0.0	3.2
1975–76	Los Angeles	9	–	17.6	.395	–	.769	2.1	2.3	0.3	0.0	4.9
Career		516	–	22.2	.441	–	.833	1.9	3.5	0.6	0.0	9.3

==== Playoffs ====
Year	Team	GP	GS	MPG	FG%	3P%	FT%	RPG	APG	SPG	BPG	PPG
1968–69	San Francisco	4	–	10.5	.385	–	**1.000**	1.0	0.8	–	–	6.0
1970–71	San Francisco	5	–	**34.4**	.381	–	.895	**3.4**	**5.8**	–	–	**13.0**
1971–72	Golden State	5	–	16.6	.290	–	.933*	1.6	2.0	–	–	6.4
1972–73	Golden State	3	–	6.7	**.667**	–	**1.000**	0.3	1.7	–	–	3.0
1973–74	Milwaukee	**15**	–	23.6	.467	–	.800	1.8	3.1	**0.6**	**0.2**	8.7
Career		32	–	21.0	.419	–	.881	1.8	2.9	0.6	0.2	8.1

=== College ===
Year	Team	GP	GS	MPG	FG%	3P%	FT%	RPG	APG	SPG	BPG	PPG
1965–66	West Virginia	**28**	–	–	.443	–	.728	**5.3**	–	–	–	19.7
1966–67	West Virginia	**28**	–	**37.2**	**.455**	–	.710	4.3	**7.0**	–	–	20.1
1967–68	West Virginia	**28**	–	–	.422	–	**.783**	3.8	5.5	–	–	**20.4**
Career		84	–	37.2	.439	–	.741	4.5	6.3	–	–	20.1
