= Jerry Lucas =

American basketball player and author (born 1940)

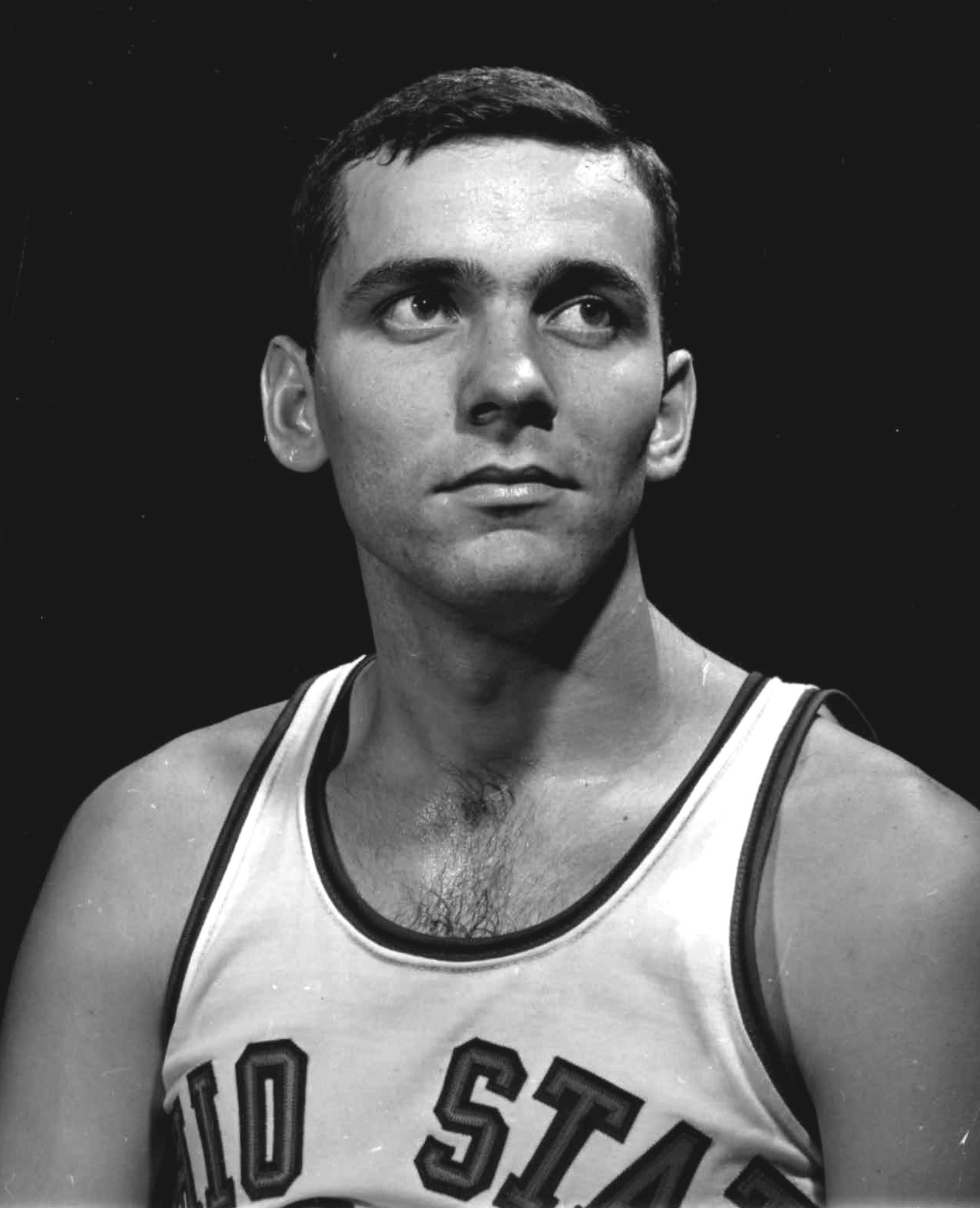
- Lucas in 1961

Personal information
- Born: March 30, 1940 (age 86) Middletown, Ohio, U.S.
- Listed height: 6 ft 8 in (2.03 m)
- Listed weight: 230 lb (104 kg)

Career information
- High school: Middletown (Middletown, Ohio)
- College: Ohio State (1959–1962)
- NBA draft: 1962: territorial pick
- Drafted by: Cincinnati Royals
- Playing career: 1962–1974
- Position: Power forward
- Number: 16, 47, 32

Career history
- 1963–1969: Cincinnati Royals
- 1969–1971: San Francisco Warriors
- 1971–1974: New York Knicks

Career highlights
- NBA champion (1973); 7× NBA All-Star (1964–1969, 1971); NBA All-Star Game MVP (1965); 3× All-NBA First Team (1965, 1966, 1968); 2× All-NBA Second Team (1964, 1967); NBA Rookie of the Year (1964); NBA All-Rookie First Team (1964); NBA anniversary team (50th, 75th); NCAA champion (1960); 2× NCAA Final Four MOP (1960, 1961); 2× Consensus national college player of the year (1961, 1962); 3× Consensus first-team All-American (1960–1962); 2× NCAA rebounding leader (1961, 1962); 3× First-team All-Big Ten (1960–1962); No. 11 retired by Ohio State Buckeyes; 2× Mr. Basketball USA (1957, 1958); 2× First-team Parade All-American (1957, 1958)

Career NBA statistics
- Points: 14,053 (17.0 ppg)
- Rebounds: 12,942 (15.6 rpg)
- Assists: 2,732 (3.3 apg)
- Stats at NBA.com
- Stats at Basketball Reference
- Basketball Hall of Fame
- Collegiate Basketball Hall of Fame
Medals
Men's basketball
Representing United States
Olympic Games
Gold medal – first place	1960 Rome	Team competition

Jerry Ray Lucas (born March 30, 1940) is an American former basketball player. He was a nationally awarded high school player, national college star at Ohio State University, and 1960 gold medal Olympian and international player before later starring as a professional player in the National Basketball Association (NBA).

As a collegian, Lucas led the Ohio State Buckeyes to three straight NCAA finals (1960–1962), winning the national championship in 1960, and finishing as runner-up in 1961 and 1962. He is the only three-time Big Ten Basketball Player of the Year and was named the NCAA Player of the Year in 1961 and 1962 by the United States Basketball Writers Association (now Oscar Robertson Award), the Associated Press, and the Sporting News. He was also named Sports Illustrated Sportsman of the Year in 1961.

As a professional, Lucas was named All-NBA First Team three times, All-NBA Second Team twice, an NBA All-Star seven times (including six years in a row), was the 1964 NBA Rookie of the Year, and was named Most Valuable Player of the 1965 NBA All-Star Game among other honors and awards. He is one of eight players to ever achieve the basketball Triple Crown, and was inducted to the Naismith Memorial Basketball Hall of Fame in 1980.

== Early life ==
Jerry Ray Lucas was born on March 30, 1940, in Middletown, Ohio, a community of 30,000+ halfway between Dayton and Cincinnati. Middletown then called itself "The Basketball Capital of Ohio", based on the success of the basketball teams from the town's one high school. The Middies had already won five Ohio state high school championships between 1945 and 1955 before Lucas ever played at Middletown High. Local support for the team was remarkably high in the early and mid-1950s. A tall youth, Lucas was encouraged to take up the game and soon dedicated himself to the town's game.

In addition to strong local support for Middletown High basketball, the city was also home to a summer outdoor basketball scene that had developed at Sunset Park. Previous Middletown players who had gone on to play at the college level had successfully recruited other college players to play there in the summer. By the time Lucas was age 15 in 1955, Sunset Park was a prominent summer basketball scene in the region. By then, Lucas had also grown to 6'7" and had the opportunity to scrimmage against these college players.

By that time, Lucas had maintained a well performed academic record and demonstrated an interest in his memorization techniques. He began creating memory-based games at age of nine. One trick he would be known for was his ability to take words apart and reassemble them quickly in alphabetical order. "Basketball" became "aabbekllst". He also applied his intelligence successfully to his coaching in the game.

== High school ==
Lucas started play at Middletown as a sophomore in the 1955–56 season. Even at 15, Lucas was a remarkable athlete who could play above the rim. His coach, Paul Walker, had already won three Ohio state champions at Middletown, and Lucas consistently found himself surrounded by strong teammates. As a sophomore, Lucas focused his game primarily on rebounding and passing, but still became a scoring star. Middletown's schedule often featured strong teams from Cincinnati, Dayton, and Columbus, but remained undefeated. A February game held at Cincinnati Gardens against rival Hamilton, itself a nearby former state champion, drew over 13,000 at a time when crowd sizes of that kind were uncommon at any level of the game. The two state powers repeated that feat there in 1958.

In addition to being an excellent rebounder, Lucas also made 60% of his shots from the floor and 75% of his free throws. Wearing number #13, he was often compared to Wilt Chamberlain during his high school years. The 1955–56 Middletown team went undefeated, winning the state championship, and the 1956–57 team did too. He suffered just one loss as a senior, a 63–62 defeat in a state semi-final game against Columbus North. That loss ended a state-record 76 game win streak. Lucas carried a 34-point scoring average through his high school years, and received national press when he surpassed Chamberlain's high school total in points.

Throughout Lucas' career Middletown continued playing top prep teams from around the state. At Cleveland Arena, 12,000 fans saw Lucas score 53 points as Middletown won 99–78 against the undefeated Cleveland East Tech team in the 1956 state playoffs. In 1957, over 15,000 watched Middletown top Toledo Macomber in another state playoff game at Saint John Arena, then the home floor of the Ohio State Buckeyes. With this high level of exposure, Lucas received college scholarship offers from more than 150 schools, and was one of the most publicized American high school players when he graduated from high school in 1958. Lucas also threw the discus in track and field, finishing third at state in 1957, and fifth at state in 1958. Lucas was also a member of the National Honor Society.

Lucas ended his high school career as Middletown's number one scorer with 2,460 points. In three years on the varsity he led the Middies to a 76–1 record, three state final fours (1956–1958), winning two state championships (1956 & 1957).

== College career ==
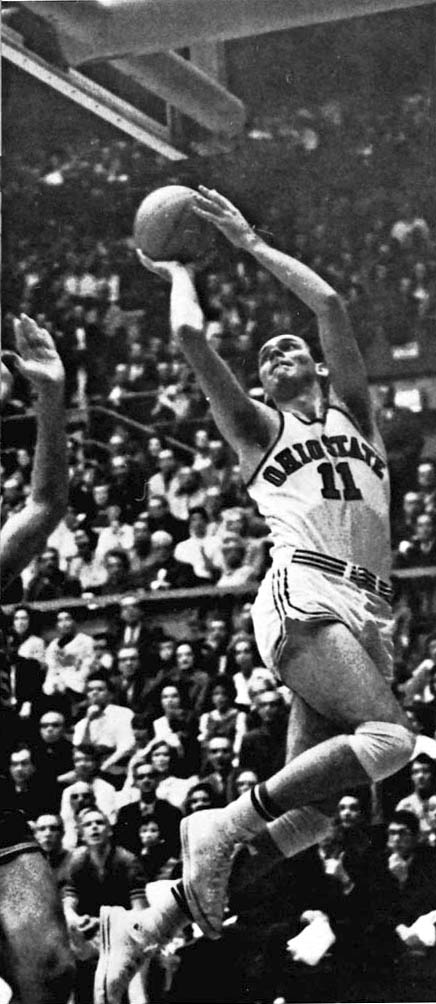
Lucas in action with Ohio State in 1960

Lucas was the subject of considerable recruiting interest while at Middletown, to such a degree that measures were taken to protect the privacy of Lucas and his family. When he announced for Ohio State, he became the center of a legendary recruiting class in 1958 that included two more future Hall of Famers in player John Havlicek and future coach Bob Knight. Mel Nowell joined the group as well, giving the group three future NBA players with Lucas and Havlicek. Buckeyes freshman coach Fred Taylor helped all four feel comfortable with coming to Ohio State and soon after he was promoted to head varsity coach. Lucas had insisted on an academic scholarship to Ohio State and would continue to be an A-student at the college level. In addition to publicized scrimmages against an 11–11 1958–59 Ohio State varsity, the freshman Lucas was also asked by Woody Hayes to tutor Ohio State football players in their studies. Such was his reputation as a student. Lucas was also a member of the fraternity Beta Theta Pi at Ohio State.

Lucas played at a time when freshmen athletes were ineligible for varsity college sports, so he and his new teammates had to wait until 1959–60 to lead Ohio State. The four new recruits joined future NBA players Larry Siegfried and Joe Roberts on a loaded Buckeyes team for second-year varsity coach Taylor. The high offense Buckeyes scored 90 points per game and were soon known for their shooting accuracy and rebounding. After two early losses to Utah and Kentucky, the team lost only one more the rest of the way en route to the 1960 NCAA national championship. The Buckeyes overwhelmed defending champion California, 75–55, at the Cow Palace in San Francisco to win the 1960 title. Lucas, passing often, still averaged 26 points per game on a then-record 63% shooting. He also averaged 16 rebounds per game and was named Most Outstanding Player of the 1960 NCAA Final Four. Lucas was on the cover of Sports Illustrated for the first time in January 1960.

In 1960–61, #1-ranked Ohio State ran a winning streak of 32 games all the way to the NCAA Final. Lucas and the team received considerable national publicity that year, especially after winning the 1960 Holiday Tournament at Madison Square Garden. In March 1961 against Kentucky, Lucas became the only college player to date to ever record a "30–30" in an NCAA tournament game (33 points, 30 rebounds). But in the finals, they were upset by the University of Cincinnati Bearcats, in overtime, 70–65.

By the time the 1961–62 season had started, the 6' 8" 230-pound Lucas had played basketball nearly non-stop for two years—he played the 1959–60 season, 1960 Olympics, 1960–61 season, and then the 1961 Amateur Athletic Union (AAU) tour of the Soviet Union. Therefore, health was an issue when he returned from Russia weighing just 200 pounds in the fall of 1961. His sore knees were also an issue throughout his basketball career. But Lucas and the Buckeyes again posted another strong season and made it to the NCAA final, their third straight. Lucas was badly injured against Wake Forest in the semifinal preceding his rematch against the University of Cincinnati Bearcats. But he opted to play in the 1962 final anyway, believing it was his last game ever. During his college career, he had stated repeatedly that he would never turn pro. In his final college game, he moved poorly and Cincinnati again topped Ohio State. Lucas was All-American First Team all three years at Ohio State. His #11 was later the second number ever retired by the college in any sport. He is still widely considered the greatest player to ever play in the Big Ten today. The team went 78–6 during his years. Gaining strong national exposure during these years, Lucas was named 1961 Sports Illustrated Sportsman of the Year, the first-ever basketball player to win the award. In 1963, he was awarded the Big Ten Medal of Honor, which recognizes one student from the graduating class of each Big Ten member school, for demonstrating joint athletic and academic excellence throughout their college career. Lucas is still widely regarded as one of the greatest college players of all time.

== 1960 Olympics and international play ==
In the wake of leading the 1960 NCAA champions, Lucas was also named to the 1960 U.S.A. Olympic team for the Rome Games that year. He had a sub-par Olympic Trials, due to fatigue from the NCAA final and the high altitude of the Trials in Denver, but still easily led all Trials players in rebounding. Initially named to the U.S. team as a reserve forward, Lucas begged Olympic head coach Pete Newell to try him at his natural center spot. Despite the fact that two 6'11" centers, Walt Bellamy and Darrall Imhoff, were present, Lucas got time at center and emerged as the regular starter for the U.S. team. The biggest game was played against the Soviet Union in September at the Palazzetto dello Sport in Rome, which the Americans won, 81–65. Lucas then scored 21 points in the gold medal final against Brazil to finish second to teammate Oscar Robertson for the team lead in scoring, with 134 points scored in the Olympics over eight games. Despite the physical play near the basket during those Games, Lucas received just six free throws total, but shot 80% from the floor to be a top scorer.

Afterward, Coach Newell, whose California team had just lost to Ohio State and Lucas in the 1960 NCAA final, called Lucas "the greatest player I ever coached, and the most unselfish". The U.S. team also included future pro stars Jerry West, Terry Dischinger, Adrian Smith, and Bob Boozer. Lucas's international play also includes being named to a team of AAU stars that toured the Soviet Union in mid-1961. That team played games in Moscow, Leningrad, and Kyiv with Lucas starring at center, and won all eight games played. The coach of the team was future Basketball Hall of Famer John McLendon. The team had gotten the Soviet invitation when the AAU Cleveland Pipers, owned by a young George Steinbrenner, had won the AAU national championship. At the time, Steinbrenner was considering Lucas as a future pro player, and maneuvered to invite him onto the tour team. In 1964, Lucas was also part of a team of NBA players that played behind the Iron Curtain in Poland, Romania and Yugoslavia. Having toured the Soviet Union in 1961 as that team's big star, Lucas was reportedly requested by these countries for the 1964 NBA tour. That team was coached by basketball Hall of Famer Red Auerbach and included several Boston Celtics, in addition to his Cincinnati pro teammate, Oscar Robertson.

== Professional career ==
=== Cleveland Pipers ===
"I never had any special desire to be a professional basketball player," Lucas later said about his pro career. In 1962, pro basketball had two cash-strapped leagues—the NBA and the startup ABL—and both coveted Lucas because of the crowds he drew. In the NBA, the Cincinnati Royals had long held that league's rights to Lucas, having drafted him as a high schooler with a territorial selection, which was allowed in the league then. However, Lucas declined their contract offer in May 1962.

This created an opportunity for the other league. The now-ABL Cleveland Pipers drafted Lucas, too. They interested the young star with a rare combination business-player contract offer. As part of the deal, Lucas received ownership stock in the team. The ABL agreed to shorten their season for him as well.

The NBA then made overtures to have the Pipers, with Lucas, jump leagues that summer. When that deal was approved by Steinbrenner, the NBA Royals protested and admission fees were added to the Cleveland deal. Unable to make all of the considerable payments, Steinbrenner's team later collapsed and folded. With the ABL losing their league champion in Cleveland and dropping to just six teams afterward, their league folded as well at the end of 1962.

By then, Lucas had signed a business deal with Cleveland advertisers Howard Marks and Carl Glickman, and spoke often of having an NBA franchise in Cleveland. Because of this contract, he missed the 1962–63 NBA season. When the Marks expansion deal was denied by the NBA, Lucas was released from that contract. He decided he wanted to play pro basketball after all, and the Royals retained his rights.

=== Cincinnati Royals (1963–1969) ===
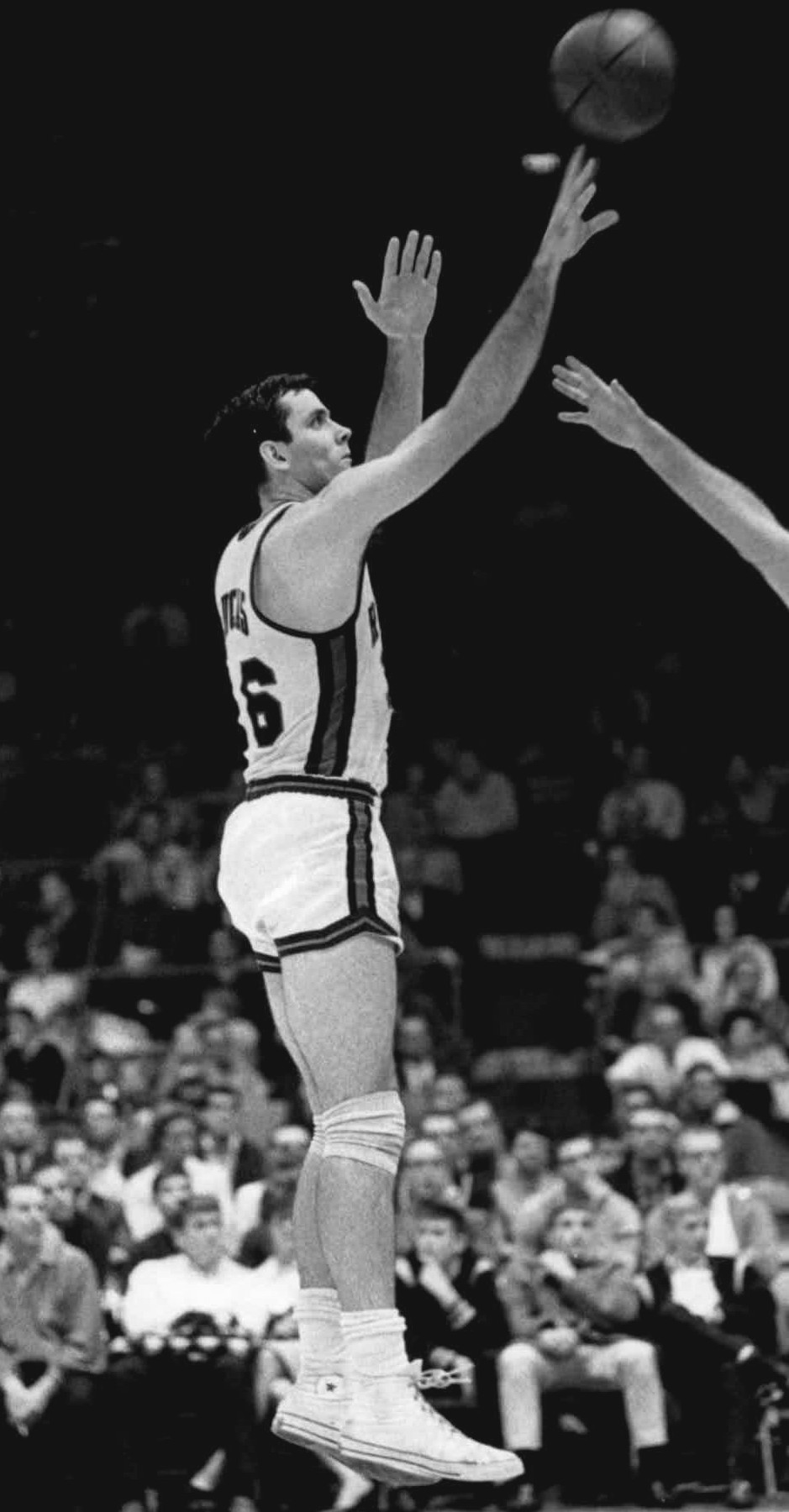
Jerry Lucas in 1965

The Cincinnati Royals had reportedly been considering Lucas since before their arrival to the city of Cincinnati in 1957. They had secured rights to him in 1958 and drafted him in 1962. In August 1963, Lucas finally signed with Warren Hensel, who was then in process of briefly becoming the team's owner. Signing the locally well-known Middletown and Ohio State star surged ticket sales for the team which had steadily declined in the two seasons before his signing. Attendance at Royals games doubled during Lucas's first season of 1963–64.

In addition to Lucas, the 1963–64 Royals squad included three NBA All-Stars: Oscar Robertson, Wayne Embry and Jack Twyman. Lucas was moved to the big forward position his first season, and the Royals soon had the second-best record in the NBA that year. His role on the team would again be chiefly rebounding and other support play, but he scored 20 or more points several times, and led the league in field goal percentage as a rookie. Lucas also had four 30-rebound games, and one 40-rebound game on February 29, 1964, and remains the only NBA forward with a 40-rebound game. In the 1964 NBA playoffs, Lucas was injured when a Philadelphia player collided with him from behind. He played through the injury, but never quite recovered his form during the playoffs. In Cincinnati's one playoff game win over Boston, Lucas posted a triple-double game with 16 points, 10 assists, and 25 rebounds, but the Royals lost in the Eastern Conference Finals.

In his second season, 1964–65, Lucas was asked to shoot and score more. In 1964–65 and 1965–66, he enjoyed his best seasons in Cincinnati, with the Royals posting a top 3 finish in the league each season. As one of the NBA's most accurate shooters, Lucas posted two seasons of over 21 points per game as the team's #2 scorer. He also averaged over 20 rebounds per game both seasons. In 1965–66, Lucas averaged 21.1 rebounds over 79 games, with 1668 rebounds total on the season. Those are both still all-time rebounding marks for NBA forwards. In addition to his scoring, rebounding, and shooting, Lucas made a name for himself as a big minutes man. In a sport where a regulation NBA game is 48 minutes, Lucas routinely played 43–44 minutes per game at two positions, starting forward, then backup center. Knee pain was still a big concern, and after the 1965–66 season, he nearly retired, but he found a prescription anti-inflammatory drug that allowed him to continue as a player. In the 1964–65 playoffs, Lucas averaged 23.3 points, 21 rebounds and 48.8 minutes over four games against Philadelphia. In the 1965–66 playoffs, he averaged 21.4 points, 20.2 rebounds and 46.2 minutes over the best-of-five series. He had again been injured in the 1966 playoffs, accidentally undercut from behind by a teammate, but still toughed through big minutes of play. He was named Most Valuable Player of the 1965 NBA All-Star Game in St. Louis, having scored 26 points. In the 1966 All-Star Game held in Cincinnati, he collected a team-high 19 rebounds for the East. In the fall of 1966, the Royals announced the move of nine or more home games to Cleveland, where the team hoped to use Lucas, the former would-be ABL Piper, as a popular crowd draw. He was becoming a heavier player who weighed 240–250 pounds, but he still was a starting East All-Star.

With the team declining at this point, and with his own health concerns, Lucas focused more on off-court business. As a cutting-edge corporate athlete, he sought endorsements. He also studied investment opportunities and tax shelters. By 1968, Lucas was reportedly worth over a million dollars, most of it built on off-court investments. There were only two or three other millionaire players in the NBA at that time. His most famous investment was his growing fast-food chain, Jerry Lucas Beef N Shakes. Lucas also created a number of children's games during this period, starting his own toys and games company. He published a book on the many magic card tricks he often performed himself.

Healthier in 1967–68, he bounced back to postseason averages of 21.5 points per game, 52% shooting, 19 rebounds, and 44.1 minutes over all 82 games. He was second in the league to Chamberlain in rebounds and minutes played. He had also topped Bill Russell of Boston by more than 100 rebounds on the season as just the second player ever to out-rebound Russell over a full season. He was First Team All-NBA again, but the Royals missed the playoffs on the last day of the season.

Over 308 games from 1964 to 1968, Lucas averaged 20.5 points and 19.8 rebounds per game. The only other NBA player to be '20–20' as often was Chamberlain. The 1968–69 season saw the Royals briefly in first place early in the season. Tom Van Arsdale had been added to a team that included Robertson, Lucas and Connie Dierking, but the team played 15 regular season home games outside Cincinnati, which increased their traveling. The extra travel caused the team to wear down after their hot start. Lucas played in his sixth straight All-Star Game in 1969.

In 1969, the American economy tightened, and Lucas saw his lines of credit for his many investments close. Overextended on several fronts, his portfolio of investments collapsed. Lucas was soon forced to declare bankruptcy. His popularity among players, some of whom had lost their investments with him, declined markedly for a time.

=== San Francisco Warriors (1969–1971) ===
In 1969, Bob Cousy took over as coach of the Royals, who had again missed the playoffs in the tough NBA East Division of the day. Wanting more of a running team, Cousy did not favor Lucas, now a heavier, slower player. But Lucas had a no-trade clause in his contract, and could steer his transfer to a chosen team. He chose San Francisco. In 1969–70, he suffered a broken hand, and went through a tough season. He bounced back to form in 1970–71, though, bringing himself back into playing shape at 230 pounds. Lucas averaged 19.2 points per game on 50% shooting, 15.8 rebounds and 3.7 assists. He returned to the NBA All-Star Game in 1971 for the seventh and final time. He was fifth in the league in rebounding in an NBA that now had 17 teams. Playing with Nate Thurmond, Clyde Lee, Jeff Mullins and Ron Williams, the .500 Warriors made the 1971 playoffs before losing to a powerful Milwaukee team that later won the 1971 NBA title.

=== New York Knicks (1971–1974) ===
By 1971, Lucas had established himself as one of the most accurate shooters and top rebounders in the league. With the Warriors needing a small scoring forward, Lucas was acquired by the New York Knicks for Cazzie Russell on May 7, 1971. The Knicks needed a big man to back up their starting center Willis Reed and power forward Dave DeBusschere. However, early in the 1971–72 season, Reed went down with a season-ending injury and Lucas was pressed into service at center. He was the smallest center in the league, and many were skeptical about how Lucas and the Knicks would do with this lineup. But at 31, Lucas had what may have been his best pro season, leading the Knicks in rebounds and shooting accuracy, and second on the team in both scoring and assists to Walt Frazier. His outside shooting, often well past today's three-point line, changed defensive strategies, as opponents were forced to send their big man 20 feet from the basket to guard Lucas.

Lucas shot 51.2% from the floor that season. He was also an outstanding passing center, just as he had been in college. The team was fourth in the NBA in defense with Lucas at center. The Knicks then upset both Baltimore and Boston to make the 1972 NBA finals against Los Angeles. Lucas figured strongly in both series wins. Lucas also played very well, averaging 20.8 points on 50% shooting, 9.8 rebounds, 6.2 assists and 46.6 minutes in the series against the Lakers and Wilt Chamberlain. When Game Four went to overtime, he played all 53 minutes. But New York lost the series.

During this time, Lucas gained some press for a magic trick, "The Phone Book". In it, he memorized about 50 pages of the Manhattan White Pages phone book. After other demonstrations, a party held by writer Dick Schaap and teammate Bill Bradley saw the trick tested by world chess champion Bobby Fischer, who was reportedly astounded.

In 1972–73, Reed, the New York team captain and star, returned. Lucas was sent to the bench for the first time in his career. But, to keep Reed healthy for the playoffs, he still played often. In averaging ten points and seven rebounds, he also averaged 4.5 assists. The team made the NBA finals again, and this time New York won. This made Lucas one of the first to become a champion at every level of the game – high school, college, Olympics, and NBA (a feat matched by Quinn Buckner, and Magic Johnson). He is one of eight players who has ever achieved the basketball Triple Crown.

In the 1973–74 season, the Knicks made a run to repeat as champions, but lost to perennial rival Boston in the Eastern Conference Finals. Lucas played far less and was physically declining in his 11th professional season. The 34-year-old Lucas retired from the NBA following the season. His 15.6 per game career rebounding average is fourth-highest in league history as of 2020, and his 12,942 total is 17th all-time. He is also seventh all-time in minutes played per game, despite being a reserve the last two years of his career.

== Legacy ==
In 1980, he was inducted into the Naismith Memorial Basketball Hall of Fame with Oscar Robertson and Jerry West, all in their first year of eligibility. He was selected by the NBA in 1996 as one of its 50 Greatest Players in NBA History, and again in 2021 as part of the NBA 75th Anniversary Team. In 1999 Sports Illustrated named Lucas to their Five Man College Team of the Century. In 2021, to commemorate the NBA's 75th Anniversary The Athletic ranked the top 75 players of all time, and named Lucas as the 72nd greatest player in NBA history.

== NBA career statistics ==
Legend
GP	Games played	GS	Games started	MPG	Minutes per game
FG%	Field goal percentage	3P%	3-point field goal percentage	FT%	Free throw percentage
RPG	Rebounds per game	APG	Assists per game	SPG	Steals per game
BPG	Blocks per game	PPG	Points per game	**Bold**	Career high
†	Won an NBA championship	*	Led the league

=== Regular season ===
Year	Team	GP	GS	MPG	FG%	3P%	FT%	RPG	APG	SPG	BPG	PPG
1963–64	Cincinnati	79	—	41.4	.527*	—	.779	17.4	2.6	—	—	17.7
1964–65	Cincinnati	66	—	43.4	.498	—	**.814**	20.0	2.4	—	—	21.4
1965–66	Cincinnati	79	—	**44.5**	.453	—	.787	**21.1**	2.7	—	—	**21.5**
1966–67	Cincinnati	81*	—	43.9	.459	—	.791	19.1	3.3	—	—	17.8
1967–68	Cincinnati	**82**	—	44.1	.519	—	.778	19.0	3.3	—	—	**21.5**
1968–69	Cincinnati	74	—	41.6	**.551**	—	.755	18.4	4.1	—	—	18.3
1969–70	Cincinnati	4	—	29.5	.514	—	.714	11.3	2.3	—	—	10.3
1969–70	San Francisco	63	—	36.5	.507	—	.786	14.4	2.6	—	—	15.4
1970–71	San Francisco	80	—	40.6	.498	—	.787	15.8	3.7	—	—	19.2
1971–72	New York	77	—	38.0	.512	—	.791	13.1	4.1	—	—	16.7
1972–73†	New York	71	—	28.2	.513	—	.800	7.2	**4.5**	—	—	9.9
1973–74	New York	73	—	22.3	.462	—	.698	5.1	3.2	**.4**	**.3**	6.2
Career		829	—	38.8	.499	—	.783	15.6	3.3	.4	.3	17.0
All-Star		7	6	26.1	.547	—	.905	9.1	1.7	—	—	12.7

=== Playoffs ===
Year	Team	GP	GS	MPG	FG%	3P%	FT%	RPG	APG	SPG	BPG	PPG
1964	Cincinnati	10	—	37.0	.390	—	.703	12.5	3.4	—	—	12.2
1965	Cincinnati	4	—	**48.8**	**.507**	—	.773	**21.0**	2.3	—	—	**23.3**
1966	Cincinnati	5	—	46.2	.471	—	.771	20.2	2.8	—	—	21.4
1967	Cincinnati	4	—	45.8	.436	—	**1.000**	19.3	2.0	—	—	12.5
1971	San Francisco	5	—	34.2	.506	—	.688	10.0	3.2	—	—	17.8
1972	New York	16	—	46.1	.500	—	.831	10.8	**5.3**	—	—	18.6
1973†	New York	**17**	—	21.6	.482	—	.870	5.0	2.3	—	—	7.5
1974	New York	11	—	10.5	.238	—	—	2.0	.8	**.4**	.0	.9
Career		72	—	32.9	.467	—	.786	10.0	3.0	.4	.0	12.4

== Post-playing career ==
After his NBA career ended, Lucas pursued publishing and educational endeavors. In 1974 he co-authored a New York Times best-seller, The Memory Book, and he developed an educational product he named the Lucas Learning System. Along with multiple editions of The Memory Book, Lucas has written over 70 other books, most of them related to education or memorization. In 1977, he appeared as a contestant on the game show The $128,000 Question, answering questions on the subject of the Bible.

== Personal life ==
Lucas has been a committed Christian since his final year in the NBA when he memorized large sections of the New Testament, and many of his current speaking engagements are at churches. He was married to Treva Lucas while in college and divorced in 1974. That same year he married contemporary Christian singer Sharalee Beard. In the 1980s he and Sharalee divorced, and Lucas married Cheri Wulff. Lucas and his wife currently live in Gallipolis, Ohio. His younger brother is the former football coach Roy Lucas, who died in 2019.

== See also ==
- Mr. Basketball USA
- List of National Basketball Association career rebounding leaders
- List of National Basketball Association players with most rebounds in a game
- List of NCAA Division I men's basketball season rebounding leaders
