= 1971 NBA playoffs =

Postseason tournament

Tournament details
- Dates: March 24–April 30, 1971
- Season: 1970–71
- Teams: 8

Final positions
- Champions: Milwaukee Bucks (1st title)
- Runners-up: Baltimore Bullets
- Semifinalists: Los Angeles Lakers; New York Knicks

The 1971 NBA playoffs was the postseason tournament of the National Basketball Association's 1970–71 season. The tournament concluded with the Western Conference champion Milwaukee Bucks defeating the Eastern Conference champion Baltimore Bullets four games to none in the NBA Finals.

Led by Finals MVP and the previous season's Rookie of the Year Lew Alcindor and Oscar Robertson, the Bucks became the fastest expansion team in NBA history to win the championship (a record that they still hold through 2025), and did so in dominating fashion, finishing 12–2 in the playoffs with a postseason average point differential of 14.5.

The playoff format kept the number of teams qualifying the same, albeit with a different format from the two-division format, since there were now four divisions rather than two due to the Eastern and Western Divisions being renamed as the Eastern and Western Conferences, with each division qualifying its champion and second-place team (as opposed to having the top four from the Eastern and Western). In the Conference Semifinals, the champion of each division played the second place team in the other, with the divisional champion having home-court advantage. The two winners then played for the conference championship.

This was the first NBA Finals appearance for the Bullets, and their only trip to the championship round in Baltimore; they made three more appearances (winning one title) later in the decade.

The 1971 playoffs was the last for the San Francisco Warriors under that moniker; the following season, symbolizing their already-established home base of Oakland, they changed their name to the Golden State Warriors.

== Bracket ==
Conference Semifinals
A1 | New York* | 4
C2 | Atlanta | 1
Eastern Conference
C1 | Baltimore* | 4
A2 | Philadelphia | 3
M1 | Milwaukee* | 4
P2 | San Francisco | 1
Western Conference
P1 | Los Angeles* | 4
M2 | Chicago | 3

Conference Finals
A1 | New York* | 3
C1 | Baltimore* | 4
M1 | Milwaukee* | 4
P1 | Los Angeles* | 1

NBA Finals
C1 | Baltimore* | 0
M1 | Milwaukee* | 4

- * Division winner
- Bold Series winner
- Italic Team with home-court advantage

== Conference semifinals ==
=== Eastern Conference semifinals ===
==== (A1) New York Knicks vs. (C2) Atlanta Hawks ====
March 25

Boxscore

Atlanta Hawks 101, New York Knicks 112
Scoring by quarter: 22–32, 26–22, 32–21, 21–37
| Pts: Pete Maravich 23; Rebs: Bill Bridges 13; Asts: Hazzard, Maravich 5 each | Pts: Bill Bradley 25; Rebs: Willis Reed 22; Asts: Bill Bradley 4 |
New York leads series, 1–0

Madison Square Garden, New York City, New York
Attendance: 19,500

March 27

Boxscore

Atlanta Hawks 113, New York Knicks 104
Scoring by quarter: 14–26, 35–30, 33–23, 31–25
| Pts: Lou Hudson 35; Rebs: Bill Bridges 36; Asts: Pete Maravich 5 | Pts: Walt Frazier 29; Rebs: Dave DeBusschere 15; Asts: Bill Bradley 4 |
Series tied, 1–1

Madison Square Garden, New York City, New York
Attendance: 19,500

March 28

Boxscore

New York Knicks 110, Atlanta Hawks 95
Scoring by quarter: 24–27, 23–27, 37–23, 26–18
| Pts: Willis Reed 26; Rebs: Dave DeBusschere 17; Asts: Walt Frazier 9 | Pts: Walt Bellamy 29; Rebs: Walt Bellamy 18; Asts: Walt Hazzard 7 |
New York leads series, 2–1

Alexander Memorial Coliseum, Atlanta, Georgia
Attendance: 7,192

March 30

Boxscore

New York Knicks 113, Atlanta Hawks 107
Scoring by quarter: 32–28, 31–29, 27–29, 23–21
| Pts: Walt Frazier 26; Rebs: Dave DeBusschere 13; Asts: Walt Frazier 8 | Pts: Walt Bellamy 25; Rebs: Bill Bridges 18; Asts: Walt Hazzard 9 |
New York leads series, 3–1

Alexander Memorial Coliseum, Atlanta, Georgia
Attendance: 7,192

April 1

Boxscore

Atlanta Hawks 107, New York Knicks 111
Scoring by quarter: 28–25, 29–25, 28–25, 22–33
| Pts: Lou Hudson 29; Rebs: Bellamy, Bridges 20 each Asts: Walt Bellamy 5 | Pts: Dave DeBusschere 29; Rebs: Dave DeBusschere 22; Asts: Willis Reed 5 |
New York wins series, 4–1

Madison Square Garden, New York City, New York
Attendance: 19,500

This was the first playoff meeting between these two teams.

==== (C1) Baltimore Bullets vs. (A2) Philadelphia 76ers ====
March 24

Boxscore

Philadelphia 76ers 126, Baltimore Bullets 112
Scoring by quarter: 28–28, 27–28, 35–21, 36–35
| Pts: Hal Greer 30; Rebs: Luke Jackson 13; Asts: Archie Clark 7 | Pts: Loughery, Gus Johnson 19; Rebs: Wes Unseld 20; Asts: Kevin Loughery 4 |
Philadelphia leads series, 1–0

Baltimore Civic Center, Baltimore, Maryland
Attendance: 6,707

March 26

Boxscore

Baltimore Bullets 119, Philadelphia 76ers 107
Scoring by quarter: 36–29, 32–32, 24–17, 27–29
| Pts: Marin, Monroe 24 each Rebs: Wes Unseld 18; Asts: Earl Monroe 6 | Pts: Archie Clark 26; Rebs: Billy Cunningham 11; Asts: Archie Clark 6 |
Series tied, 1–1

Spectrum, Philadelphia, Pennsylvania
Attendance: 10,369

March 28

Boxscore

Philadelphia 76ers 103, Baltimore Bullets 111
Scoring by quarter: 25–27, 22–25, 29–28, 27–31
| Pts: Hal Greer 28; Rebs: Billy Cunningham 19; Asts: Billy Cunningham 10 | Pts: Earl Monroe 29; Rebs: Wes Unseld 24; Asts: Kevin Loughery 7 |
Baltimore leads series, 2–1

Baltimore Civic Center, Baltimore, Maryland
Attendance: 5,589

March 30

Boxscore

Baltimore Bullets 120, Philadelphia 76ers 105
Scoring by quarter: 30–32, 32–30, 27–19, 31–24
| Pts: Jack Marin 27; Rebs: Gus Johnson 14; Asts: Earl Monroe 6 | Pts: Archie Clark 24; Rebs: Billy Cunningham 17; Asts: Billy Cunningham 8 |
Baltimore leads series, 3–1

Spectrum, Philadelphia, Pennsylvania
Attendance: 8,909

April 1

Boxscore

Philadelphia 76ers 104, Baltimore Bullets 103
Scoring by quarter: 28–18, 30–24, 26–29, 20–32
| Pts: Billy Cunningham 32; Rebs: Billy Cunningham 20; Asts: Hal Greer 6 | Pts: Earl Monroe 26; Rebs: Wes Unseld 18; Asts: Kevin Loughery 5 |
Baltimore leads series, 3–2

Baltimore Civic Center, Baltimore, Maryland
Attendance: 10,998

April 3

Boxscore

Baltimore Bullets 94, Philadelphia 76ers 98
Scoring by quarter: 16–30, 24–25, 34–20, 20–23
| Pts: Earl Monroe 30; Rebs: Wes Unseld 18; Asts: Kevin Loughery 5 | Pts: Billy Cunningham 33; Rebs: Billy Cunningham 16; Asts: Billy Cunningham 5 |
Series tied, 3–3

Spectrum, Philadelphia, Pennsylvania
Attendance: 7,059

April 4

Boxscore

Philadelphia 76ers 120, Baltimore Bullets 128
Scoring by quarter: 30–31, 22–43, 27–25, 41–29
| Pts: Archie Clark 37; Rebs: Billy Cunningham 19; Asts: Clark, Greer 5 each | Pts: Jack Marin 33; Rebs: Wes Unseld 22; Asts: Gus Johnson 8 |
Baltimore wins series, 4–3

Baltimore Civic Center, Baltimore, Maryland
Attendance: 6,662

- Bailey Howell's final NBA game.

This was the first playoff meeting between these two teams.

=== Western Conference semifinals ===
==== (M1) Milwaukee Bucks vs. (P2) San Francisco Warriors ====
March 27

Boxscore

Milwaukee Bucks 107, San Francisco Warriors 96
Scoring by quarter: 34–24, 24–28, 23–24, 26–20
| Pts: Oscar Robertson 31; Rebs: Abdul-Jabbar, Smith 10 each Asts: Oscar Robertson 9 | Pts: Jeff Mullins 30; Rebs: Nate Thurmond 15; Asts: Jeff Mullins 7 |
Milwaukee leads series, 1–0

Oakland–Alameda County Coliseum Arena, Oakland, California
Attendance: 11,216

March 29

Boxscore

San Francisco Warriors 90, Milwaukee Bucks 104
Scoring by quarter: 20–25, 24–18, 16–29, 30–32
| Pts: Nate Thurmond 18; Rebs: Clyde Lee 13; Asts: Mullins, Williams 4 each | Pts: Kareem Abdul-Jabbar 26; Rebs: Kareem Abdul-Jabbar 18; Asts: Oscar Robertson 7 |
Milwaukee leads series, 2–0

University of Wisconsin Field House, Madison, Wisconsin
Attendance: 12,868

March 30

Boxscore

San Francisco Warriors 102, Milwaukee Bucks 114
Scoring by quarter: 22–24, 20–31, 36–31, 24–28
| Pts: Jerry Lucas 25; Rebs: Jerry Lucas 20; Asts: Ron Williams 8 | Pts: Kareem Abdul-Jabbar 33; Rebs: Kareem Abdul-Jabbar 12; Asts: Lucius Allen 8 |
Milwaukee leads series, 3–0

University of Wisconsin Field House, Madison, Wisconsin
Attendance: 12,868

April 1

Boxscore

Milwaukee Bucks 104, San Francisco Warriors 106
Scoring by quarter: 24–19, 20–34, 25–25, 35–28
| Pts: Kareem Abdul-Jabbar 32; Rebs: Kareem Abdul-Jabbar 21; Asts: Lucius Allen 6 | Pts: Jerry Lucas 32; Rebs: Jeff Mullins 19; Asts: Ron Williams 9 |
Milwaukee leads series, 3–1

Oakland–Alameda County Coliseum Arena, Oakland, California
Attendance: 7,615

April 4

Boxscore

San Francisco Warriors 86, Milwaukee Bucks 136
Scoring by quarter: 18–38, 17–31, 22–36, 29–31
| Pts: Ron Williams 13; Rebs: Clyde Lee 11; Asts: Mullins, Williams 4 each | Pts: Jon McGlocklin 28; Rebs: Kareem Abdul-Jabbar 17; Asts: Lucius Allen 7 |
Milwaukee wins series, 4–1

University of Wisconsin Field House, Madison, Wisconsin
Attendance: 12,868

- All three Milwaukee home games in the series were not played at Milwaukee Arena due to scheduling conflicts.

This was the first playoff meeting between these two teams.

==== (P1) Los Angeles Lakers vs. (M2) Chicago Bulls ====
March 24

Boxscore

Chicago Bulls 99, Los Angeles Lakers 100
Scoring by quarter: 25–20, 29–19, 20–30, 25–31
| Pts: Bob Love 24; Rebs: Sloan, Boerwinkle 9 each Asts: Tom Boerwinkle 8 | Pts: Jim McMillian 26; Rebs: Wilt Chamberlain 21; Asts: Gail Goodrich 11 |
Los Angeles leads series, 1–0

The Forum, Inglewood, California
Attendance: 10,726

March 26

Boxscore

Chicago Bulls 95, Los Angeles Lakers 105
Scoring by quarter: 14–19, 29–24, 33–29, 19–33
| Pts: Bob Love 34; Rebs: Jim Fox 13; Asts: Bob Weiss 5 | Pts: Gail Goodrich 29; Rebs: Wilt Chamberlain 20; Asts: Gail Goodrich 7 |
Los Angeles leads series, 2–0

The Forum, Inglewood, California
Attendance: 13,469

March 28

Boxscore

Los Angeles Lakers 98, Chicago Bulls 106
Scoring by quarter: 26–24, 25–27, 26–22, 21–33
| Pts: Gail Goodrich 39; Rebs: Wilt Chamberlain 18; Asts: Goodrich, Chamberlain 6 each | Pts: Bob Love 27; Rebs: Chet Walker 12; Asts: Bob Weiss 11 |
Los Angeles leads series, 2–1

Chicago Stadium, Chicago, Illinois
Attendance: 10,101
Referees: Mendy Rudolph, Bob Rakel, Allan Brunkhorst

March 30

Boxscore

Los Angeles Lakers 102, Chicago Bulls 112
Scoring by quarter: 29–22, 22–30, 32–26, 19–34
| Pts: Gail Goodrich 32; Rebs: Wilt Chamberlain 23; Asts: Wilt Chamberlain 7 | Pts: Bob Love 36; Rebs: Jerry Sloan 12; Asts: Bob Weiss 13 |
Series tied, 2–2

Chicago Stadium, Chicago, Illinois
Attendance: 18,650

April 1

Boxscore

Chicago Bulls 89, Los Angeles Lakers 115
Scoring by quarter: 23–27, 31–28, 20–31, 15–29
| Pts: Bob Love 21; Rebs: Jim Fox 11; Asts: Weiss, King 7 each | Pts: Gail Goodrich 33; Rebs: Wilt Chamberlain 14; Asts: Gail Goodrich 11 |
Los Angeles leads series, 3–2

The Forum, Inglewood, California
Attendance: 13,935

April 4

Boxscore

Los Angeles Lakers 99, Chicago Bulls 113
Scoring by quarter: 30–29, 27–23, 15–28, 27–33
| Pts: Gail Goodrich 25; Rebs: Wilt Chamberlain 33; Asts: Wilt Chamberlain 9 | Pts: Bob Weiss 25; Rebs: Tom Boerwinkle 18; Asts: Boerwinkle, Walker 6 each |
Series tied, 3–3

Chicago Stadium, Chicago, Illinois
Attendance: 14,211

April 6

Boxscore

Chicago Bulls 98, Los Angeles Lakers 109
Scoring by quarter: 25–30, 23–22, 26–25, 24–32
| Pts: Sloan, Love 24 each Rebs: Jim Fox 12; Asts: Bob Weiss 8 | Pts: Gail Goodrich 29; Rebs: Wilt Chamberlain 19; Asts: Goodrich, Chamberlain 9 each |
Los Angeles wins series, 4–3

The Forum, Inglewood, California
Attendance: 17,505

This was the second playoff meeting between these two teams, with the Lakers winning the first meeting.

Previous playoff series
Los Angeles leads 1–0 in all-time playoff series

1968

Chicago Bulls 1, Los Angeles Lakers 4

1968 Western Division Semifinals

== Conference finals ==
=== Eastern Conference finals ===
==== (A1) New York Knicks vs. (C1) Baltimore Bullets ====
April 6

Boxscore

Baltimore Bullets 111, New York Knicks 112
Scoring by quarter: 28–30, 25–28, 34–28, 24–26
| Pts: Earl Monroe 29; Rebs: Wes Unseld 22; Asts: Earl Monroe 4 | Pts: Walt Frazier 24; Rebs: Dave DeBusschere 17; Asts: Walt Frazier 7 |
New York leads series, 1–0

Madison Square Garden, New York City, New York
Attendance: 19,500

April 9

Boxscore

Baltimore Bullets 88, New York Knicks 107
Scoring by quarter: 23–21, 25–27, 15–25, 25–34
| Pts: John Tresvant 20; Rebs: Wes Unseld 20; Asts: Kevin Loughery 16 | Pts: Dick Barnett 14; Rebs: Dave DeBusschere 14; Asts: Walt Frazier 5 |
New York leads series, 2–0

Madison Square Garden, New York City, New York
Attendance: 19,500

April 11

Boxscore

New York Knicks 88, Baltimore Bullets 114
Scoring by quarter: 26–25, 19–32, 18–31, 25–26
| Pts: Walt Frazier 17; Rebs: Willis Reed 10; Asts: Barnett, Bradley 5 each | Pts: Earl Monroe 31; Rebs: Wes Unseld 26; Asts: Wes Unseld 9 |
New York leads series, 2–1

Baltimore Civic Center, Baltimore, Maryland
Attendance: 8,083

April 14

Boxscore

New York Knicks 80, Baltimore Bullets 101
Scoring by quarter: 19–22, 24–29, 22–25, 15–25
| Pts: Walt Frazier 16; Rebs: Dave DeBusschere 9 Asts: Walt Frazier 5 | Pts: Jack Marin 27; Rebs: John Tresvant 17; Asts: Wes Unseld 6 |
Series tied, 2–2

Baltimore Civic Center, Baltimore, Maryland
Attendance: 12,289

April 16

Boxscore

Baltimore Bullets 84, New York Knicks 89
Scoring by quarter: 16–24, 24–20, 22–26, 22–19
| Pts: Jack Marin 25; Rebs: John Tresvant 17; Asts: Wes Unseld 3 | Pts: Walt Frazier 28; Rebs: Dave DeBusschere 17; Asts: Bill Bradley 4 |
New York leads series, 3–2

Madison Square Garden, New York City, New York
Attendance: 19,500

April 18

Boxscore

New York Knicks 96, Baltimore Bullets 113
Scoring by quarter: 18–27, 25–29, 28–34, 25–23
| Pts: Dave DeBusschere 24; Rebs: Dave DeBusschere 10; Asts: Dick Barnett 5 | Pts: Earl Monroe 27; Rebs: Wes Unseld 15; Asts: Earl Monroe 7 |
Series tied, 3–3

Baltimore Civic Center, Baltimore, Maryland
Attendance: 11,211

April 19

Boxscore

Baltimore Bullets 93, New York Knicks 91
Scoring by quarter: 19–21, 24–26, 30–21, 20–23
| Pts: Earl Monroe 26; Rebs: Wes Unseld 20; Asts: Earl Monroe 6 | Pts: Dick Barnett 26; Rebs: Willis Reed 12; Asts: Walt Frazier 4 |
Baltimore wins series, 4–3

Madison Square Garden, New York City, New York
Attendance: 19,500

- The Bullets become the second team after the Boston Celtics in the 1969 Finals to win Game 7 on the road after the home team won each of the first six games.

This was the third playoff meeting between these two teams, with the Knicks winning the first two meetings.

Previous playoff series
New York leads 2–0 in all-time playoff series

1969

Baltimore Bullets 0, New York Knicks 4

1969 Eastern Division Semifinals

1970

Baltimore Bullets 3, New York Knicks 4

1970 Eastern Division Semifinals

=== Western Conference finals ===
==== (M1) Milwaukee Bucks vs. (P1) Los Angeles Lakers ====
April 9

Boxscore

Los Angeles Lakers 85, Milwaukee Bucks 106
Scoring by quarter: 21–26, 23–17, 22–29, 19–34
| Pts: Wilt Chamberlain 22; Rebs: Wilt Chamberlain 20; Asts: Gail Goodrich 7 | Pts: Kareem Abdul-Jabbar 32; Rebs: Kareem Abdul-Jabbar 22; Asts: Oscar Robertson 10 |
Milwaukee leads series, 1–0

Milwaukee Arena, Milwaukee, Wisconsin
Attendance: 10,746

April 11

Boxscore

Los Angeles Lakers 73, Milwaukee Bucks 91
Scoring by quarter: 15–24, 22–20, 20–24, 16–23
| Pts: Wilt Chamberlain 26; Rebs: Wilt Chamberlain 22; Asts: Gail Goodrich 4 | Pts: Kareem Abdul-Jabbar 22; Rebs: Bob Dandridge 11; Asts: Oscar Robertson 7 |
Milwaukee leads series, 2–0

Milwaukee Arena, Milwaukee, Wisconsin
Attendance: 10,746

April 14

Boxscore

Milwaukee Bucks 107, Los Angeles Lakers 118
Scoring by quarter: 27–28, 28–28, 22–34, 30–28
| Pts: Bob Dandridge 25; Rebs: Kareem Abdul-Jabbar 19; Asts: Oscar Robertson 9 | Pts: four players 24 each Rebs: Wilt Chamberlain 24; Asts: Gail Goodrich 8 |
Milwaukee leads series, 2–1

The Forum, Inglewood, California
Attendance: 17,334

April 16

Boxscore

Milwaukee Bucks 117, Los Angeles Lakers 94
Scoring by quarter: 30–22, 32–29, 30–23, 25–20
| Pts: Kareem Abdul-Jabbar 31; Rebs: Kareem Abdul-Jabbar 20; Asts: Oscar Robertson 6 | Pts: Gail Goodrich 26; Rebs: Wilt Chamberlain 16; Asts: Gail Goodrich 11 |
Milwaukee leads series, 3–1

The Forum, Inglewood, California
Attendance: 17,505

April 18

Boxscore

Los Angeles Lakers 98, Milwaukee Bucks 116
Scoring by quarter: 29–30, 20–25, 17–26, 32–35
| Pts: Happy Hairston 27; Rebs: Wilt Chamberlain 12; Asts: Gail Goodrich 9 | Pts: Greg Smith 22; Rebs: Abdul-Jabbar, Dandridge 15 each Asts: Oscar Robertson 12 |
Milwaukee wins series, 4–1

Milwaukee Arena, Milwaukee, Wisconsin
Attendance: 10,746

This was the first playoff meeting between these two teams.

== NBA Finals: (M1) Milwaukee Bucks vs. (C1) Baltimore Bullets ==
April 21

Boxscore

Baltimore Bullets 88, Milwaukee Bucks 98
Scoring by quarter: 22–28, 20–22, 26–29, 20–19
| Pts: Earl Monroe 26; Rebs: John Tresvant 14; Asts: Fred Carter 4 | Pts: Kareem Abdul-Jabbar 31; Rebs: Kareem Abdul-Jabbar 17; Asts: Oscar Robertson 7 |
Milwaukee leads series, 1–0

Milwaukee Arena, Milwaukee, Wisconsin
Attendance: 10,746

April 25

Boxscore

Milwaukee Bucks 102, Baltimore Bullets 83
Scoring by quarter: 26–26, 23–19, 30–16, 23–22
| Pts: Kareem Abdul-Jabbar 27; Rebs: Kareem Abdul-Jabbar 24; Asts: Oscar Robertson 10 | Pts: Jack Marin 22; Rebs: Wes Unseld 20; Asts: Earl Monroe 6 |
Milwaukee leads series, 2–0

Baltimore Civic Center, Baltimore, Maryland
Attendance: 12,289

April 28

Boxscore

Baltimore Bullets 99, Milwaukee Bucks 107
Scoring by quarter: 22–30, 24–24, 23–25, 30–28
| Pts: Jack Marin 21; Rebs: Wes Unseld 23; Asts: Wes Unseld 6 | Pts: Bob Dandridge 29; Rebs: Kareem Abdul-Jabbar 21; Asts: Oscar Robertson 12 |
Milwaukee leads series, 3–0

Milwaukee Arena, Milwaukee, Wisconsin
Attendance: 10,746

April 30

Boxscore

Milwaukee Bucks 118, Baltimore Bullets 106
Scoring by quarter: 31–22, 29–25, 29–30, 29–29
| Pts: Oscar Robertson 30; Rebs: Abdul-Jabbar, Dandridge 12 each Asts: Oscar Robertson 9 | Pts: Fred Carter 28; Rebs: Wes Unseld 23; Asts: Wes Unseld 10 |
Milwaukee wins series, 4–0

Baltimore Civic Center, Baltimore, Maryland
Attendance: 11,842

- The Bucks win their first championship in only their third year of existence. This is also the last NBA Finals to date in which the series alternates in between the venues of the competing teams after every game as opposed to the customary 2–2–1–1–1 and 2–3–2 formats that have been used ever since (with the exception of 1975 and 1978 due to scheduling conflicts, which resulted in the use of a 1–2–2–1–1 format).

This was the first playoff meeting between these two teams.
