= 1971 NBA Finals =

1971 basketball championship series

Team	Coach	Wins
Milwaukee Bucks	Larry Costello	4
Baltimore Bullets	Gene Shue	0
- Dates: April 21–30
- MVP: Lew Alcindor (Milwaukee Bucks)
- Hall of Famers: Bucks: Lew Alcindor (as Kareem Abdul-Jabbar; 1995); Bob Dandridge (2021); Oscar Robertson (1980); Bullets: Earl Monroe (1990); Wes Unseld (1988); Gus Johnson (2010); Coaches: Larry Costello (2022)
- Eastern finals: Bullets defeated Knicks, 4–3
- Western finals: Bucks defeated Lakers, 4–1

The 1971 NBA World Championship Series was the championship series played at the conclusion of the National Basketball Association (NBA)'s 25th anniversary season of 1970–71. The Western Conference champion Milwaukee Bucks, who were founded as an expansion team three years earlier, swept the Eastern Conference champion Baltimore Bullets to win their first NBA championship in franchise history, becoming the quickest expansion team to ever win the championship. Baltimore had dethroned the 1969–70 NBA champion New York Knicks in the Eastern Conference finals. This was the first NBA Finals played between two expansion teams.

The Bucks were the first Western Conference champions to win the league's championship since the St. Louis Hawks did so in 1958, and were the first expansion team in the NBA to win a championship since the NBA held its first expansion draft. (The Bullets originally started out as the Chicago Packers, an expansion team that began play in 1961–62 before moving to Baltimore in 1963.) It was also the first NBA title by a Western Conference team that has not since folded or relocated.

The Bullets were forced to play Game 1 on a Wednesday night, just 48 hours after having defeated New York in Game 7 of the 1971 Eastern Conference finals, then had to wait four days before playing Game 2. The series was the second (and last) time in NBA history that the teams alternated home games, the other being in 1956. Most other series were held in the 2-2-1-1-1 or 2-3-2 format (a 1-2-2-1-1 format was used in 1975 and 1978). It was also the last NBA Championship Series completed before May 1.

The series was broadcast by ABC with Chris Schenkel and Jack Twyman providing the commentary. This was the last playoff series broadcast for both Schenkel and Twyman; they were replaced the next season as the lead announcing team by Keith Jackson and Bill Russell, who served two years before ABC lost the national television contract to CBS after the 1972–73 season.

Until 2021, it was the Bucks' only and the city's second championship (with the other being the 1957 Braves). The city's 50-year drought was the fourth longest title drought among American teams in the "Big 4" major professional sports leagues, behind Buffalo and San Diego. (Note: Vancouver is the only Canadian city that could be considered part of the drought, albeit on a technicality. The British Columbia Lions, who play in Vancouver, have won six Grey Cup titles as champions of the Canadian Football League, but the CFL is not considered part of the "Big 4". Vancouver only plays in one of the so-called "Big 4" leagues with the Canucks in the NHL as they have never had a franchise in MLB or in the NFL while the NBA Grizzlies only existed for a few years.)

== Series summary ==
Game	Date	Home team	Result	Road team
Game 1	April 21	Milwaukee Bucks	98–88 (1–0)	Baltimore Bullets
Game 2	April 25	Baltimore Bullets	83–102 (0–2)	Milwaukee Bucks
Game 3	April 28	Milwaukee Bucks	107–99 (3–0)	Baltimore Bullets
Game 4	April 30	Baltimore Bullets	106–118 (0–4)	Milwaukee Bucks

Bucks win series 4–0

== Game summaries ==
=== Game 1 ===
April 21

Boxscore

Baltimore Bullets 88, Milwaukee Bucks 98
Scoring by quarter: 22–28, 20–22, 26–29, 20–19
Pts: Earl Monroe 26; Rebs: John Tresvant 14; Asts: Fred Carter 4	Pts: Lew Alcindor 31; Rebs: Lew Alcindor 17; Asts: Oscar Robertson 7
Milwaukee leads series, 1–0

Milwaukee Arena, Milwaukee, Wisconsin
Attendance: 10,746
Referees: Mendy Rudolph, Don Murphy

=== Game 2 ===
April 25

Boxscore

Milwaukee Bucks 102, Baltimore Bullets 83
Scoring by quarter: 26–26, 23–19, 30–16, 23–22
Pts: Lew Alcindor 27; Rebs: Lew Alcindor 24; Asts: Oscar Robertson 10	Pts: Jack Marin 22; Rebs: Wes Unseld 20; Asts: Earl Monroe 6
Milwaukee leads series, 2–0

Baltimore Civic Center, Baltimore, Maryland
Attendance: 12,289
Referees: Richie Powers, Jack Madden

=== Game 3 ===
April 28

Boxscore

Baltimore Bullets 99, Milwaukee Bucks 107
Scoring by quarter: 22–30, 24–24, 23–25, 30–28
Pts: Jack Marin 21; Rebs: Wes Unseld 23; Asts: Wes Unseld 6	Pts: Bob Dandridge 29; Rebs: Lew Alcindor 21; Asts: Oscar Robertson 12
Milwaukee leads series, 3–0

Milwaukee Arena, Milwaukee, Wisconsin
Attendance: 10,746
Referees: Richie Powers, Ed T. Rush

=== Game 4 ===
April 30

Boxscore

Milwaukee Bucks 118, Baltimore Bullets 106
Scoring by quarter: 31–22, 29–25, 29–30, 29–29
Pts: Oscar Robertson 30; Rebs: Alcindor, Dandridge 12 each Asts: Oscar Robertson 9	Pts: Fred Carter 28; Rebs: Wes Unseld 23; Asts: Wes Unseld 10
Milwaukee wins NBA Finals, 4–0

Baltimore Civic Center, Baltimore, Maryland
Attendance: 11,842
Referees: Mendy Rudolph, Don Murphy

== Team rosters ==
=== Milwaukee Bucks ===
1970–71 Milwaukee Bucks roster
Players

Pos.	No.	Player	Height	Weight	DOB	From
C	33	Lew Alcindor	7 ft 2 in (2.18 m)	225 lb (102 kg)		UCLA
PG	7	Lucius Allen	6 ft 2 in (1.88 m)	175 lb (79 kg)		UCLA
PF	20	Bob Boozer	6 ft 8 in (2.03 m)	215 lb (98 kg)		Kansas State
C	19	Dick Cunningham	6 ft 10 in (2.08 m)	245 lb (111 kg)		Murray State
SF	10	Bob Dandridge	6 ft 6 in (1.98 m)	195 lb (88 kg)		Norfolk State
F	18	Bob Greacen	6 ft 7 in (2.01 m)	206 lb (93 kg)		Rutgers
SG	14	Jon McGlocklin	6 ft 5 in (1.96 m)	205 lb (93 kg)		Indiana
SF	35	McCoy McLemore	6 ft 7 in (2.01 m)	230 lb (104 kg)		Drake
PG	1	Oscar Robertson	6 ft 5 in (1.96 m)	205 lb (93 kg)		Cincinnati
PF	4	Greg Smith	6 ft 5 in (1.96 m)	195 lb (88 kg)		Western Kentucky
PG	8	Jeff Webb	6 ft 4 in (1.93 m)	170 lb (77 kg)		Kansas State
G	5	Marv Winkler	6 ft 1 in (1.85 m)	170 lb (77 kg)		Louisiana
G	6	Bill Zopf	6 ft 1 in (1.85 m)	170 lb (77 kg)		Duquesne

Coaches
Head coach
- Larry Costello
Assistant(s)
- Tom Nissalke

Legend
- (DP) Unsigned draft pick
- (FA) Free agent
- (S) Suspended
- Injured

=== Baltimore Bullets ===
1970–71 Baltimore Bullets roster
Players

Pos.	No.	Player	Height	Weight	DOB	From
G	3	Fred Carter	6 ft 3 in (1.91 m)	185 lb (84 kg)		Mount St. Mary's
F	31	George E. Johnson	6 ft 11 in (2.11 m)	245 lb (111 kg)		Stephen F. Austin
F	25	Gus Johnson	6 ft 6 in (1.98 m)	230 lb (104 kg)		Idaho
G	22	Kevin Loughery	6 ft 3 in (1.91 m)	190 lb (86 kg)		St. John's
F	24	Jack Marin	6 ft 6 in (1.98 m)	210 lb (95 kg)		Duke
G	15	Eddie Miles	6 ft 4 in (1.93 m)	195 lb (88 kg)		Seattle
G	10	Earl Monroe	6 ft 3 in (1.91 m)	185 lb (84 kg)		Winston-Salem State
PF	40	Dorie Murrey	6 ft 8 in (2.03 m)	229 lb (104 kg)		Detroit Mercy
PF	12	John Tresvant	6 ft 7 in (2.01 m)	215 lb (98 kg)		Seattle
SF	35	Al Tucker	6 ft 8 in (2.03 m)	190 lb (86 kg)		Oklahoma Baptist
F	41	Wes Unseld	6 ft 7 in (2.01 m)	245 lb (111 kg)		Louisville
G	11	Gary Zeller	6 ft 3 in (1.91 m)	205 lb (93 kg)		Drake

Coaches
Head coach
- Gene Shue
Assistant(s)
- Bob Ferry

Legend
- (DP) Unsigned draft pick
- (FA) Free agent
- (S) Suspended
- Injured

== See also ==
- 1970–71 NBA season
- 1971 NBA playoffs
