= Joe Cooke (basketball) =

American basketball player (1948–2006)

Personal information
- Born: August 14, 1948 Fairmont, West Virginia, U.S.
- Died: November 12, 2006 (aged 58) Toledo, Ohio, U.S.
- Listed height: 6 ft 3 in (1.91 m)
- Listed weight: 175 lb (79 kg)

Career information
- High school: Libbey (Toledo, Ohio)
- College: Indiana (1967–1970)
- NBA draft: 1970: 6th round, 94th overall pick
- Drafted by: Cleveland Cavaliers
- Position: Shooting guard
- Number: 10

Career history
- 1970–1971: Cleveland Cavaliers
- Stats at NBA.com
- Stats at Basketball Reference

Joseph Cooke Jr. (August 14, 1948 – November 12, 2006) was a professional basketball player. He played college basketball for the Indiana Hoosiers and played for the Cleveland Cavaliers during their inaugural 1970–71 season. In 73 games, he averaged 9.9 minutes and 4.3 points per game.

== Career statistics ==
Legend
GP	Games played	GS	Games started	MPG	Minutes per game
FG%	Field goal percentage	3P%	3-point field goal percentage	FT%	Free throw percentage
RPG	Rebounds per game	APG	Assists per game	SPG	Steals per game
BPG	Blocks per game	PPG	Points per game	**Bold**	Career high

=== NBA ===
==== Regular season ====
Year	Team	GP	MPG	FG%	FT%	RPG	APG	PPG
1970–71	Cleveland	73	9.9	.393	.814	1.6	1.3	4.3
