= Greg Fillmore =

American basketball player

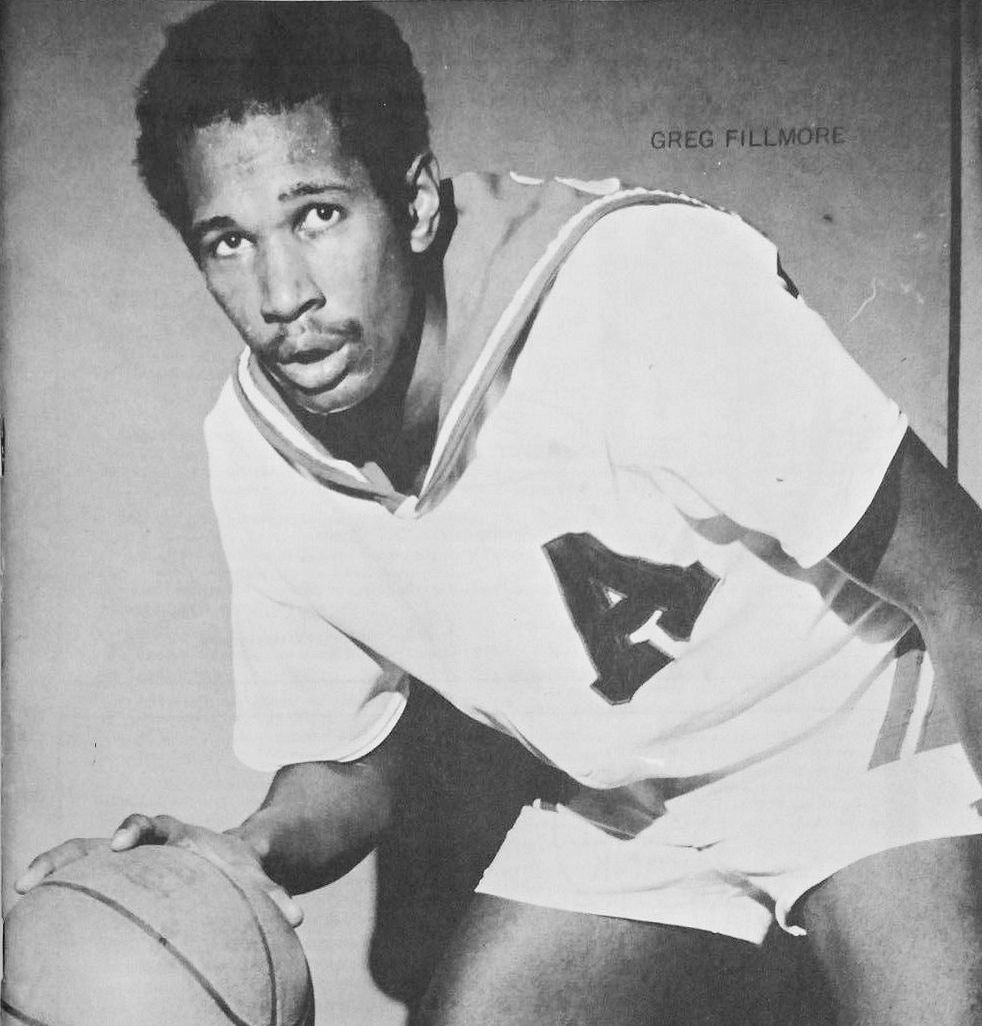
- Fillmore with the Allentown Jets in 1971

Personal information
- Born: March 7, 1947 (age 79) Philadelphia, Pennsylvania, U.S.
- Died: January 7, 2019 Jacksonville, Florida, U.S.
- Listed height: 7 ft 1 in (2.16 m)
- Listed weight: 240 lb (109 kg)

Career information
- College: Iowa Central CC (1965–1966); Cheyney (1967–1970)
- NBA draft: 1970: 8th round, 136th overall pick
- Drafted by: New York Knicks
- Playing career: 1970–1973
- Position: Center
- Number: 34

Career history
- 1970–1971: New York Knicks
- 1971–1973: Allentown Jets
- Stats at NBA.com
- Stats at Basketball Reference

Gregory Paul Fillmore (born March 7, 1947) is an American former professional basketball player. He played as a center and spent two seasons in the National Basketball Association (NBA) as a member of the New York Knicks.

Fillmore started his collegiate career at Fort Dodge Community College (now Iowa Central Community College during the 1965–66 season. He transferred to play for the Cheyney Wolves in 1967. Fillmore was suspended and missed the entire 1968–69 season. He returned to the Wolves for the 1969–70 season.

Fillmore was drafted by the Knicks during the eighth round of the 1970 NBA draft.

Fillmore played two seasons with the Allentown Jets of the Eastern Basketball Association (EBA) from 1971 to 1973.

== Career statistics ==
Legend
GP	Games played	GS	Games started	MPG	Minutes per game
FG%	Field goal percentage	3P%	3-point field goal percentage	FT%	Free throw percentage
RPG	Rebounds per game	APG	Assists per game	SPG	Steals per game
BPG	Blocks per game	PPG	Points per game	**Bold**	Career high

=== NBA ===
==== Regular season ====
Year	Team	GP	GS	MPG	FG%	FT%	RPG	APG	PPG
1970–71	New York	**39**	**3**	**6.9**	**.441**	**.481**	**2.4**	**.4**	**2.6**
1971–72	New York	10	0	6.7	.259	.333	1.5	.3	1.5
Career		49	3	6.9	.403	.467	2.2	.4	2.4

=== Playoffs ===
Year	Team	GP	MPG	FG%	FT%	RPG	APG	PPG
1971	New York	8	3.0	.000	–	1.0	.1	.0
