= Dave Sorenson =

American basketball player (1948–2002)

Personal information
- Born: July 8, 1948 Findlay, Ohio, U.S.
- Died: July 9, 2002 (aged 54) Rocky River, Ohio, U.S.
- Listed height: 6 ft 8 in (2.03 m)
- Listed weight: 225 lb (102 kg)

Career information
- High school: Findlay (Findlay, Ohio)
- College: Ohio State (1967–1970)
- NBA draft: 1970: 2nd round, 9th overall pick
- Drafted by: Cleveland Cavaliers
- Position: Power forward
- Number: 15, 25

Career history
- 1970–1972: Cleveland Cavaliers
- 1972–1973: Philadelphia 76ers

Career highlights
- Third-team All-American – AP (1969); 2× First-team All-Big Ten (1969, 1970)
- Stats at NBA.com
- Stats at Basketball Reference

David Lowell Sorenson (July 8, 1948 – July 9, 2002) was an American basketball player who played in the National Basketball Association (NBA).

== Early life ==
He was a standout center at Findlay High School in Findlay, Ohio, graduating in 1966. He scored a single-game high of 44 points and single-season high of 521. He was named the 1966 Associated Press (AP) Ohio Player of the Year.

He was Findlay's all-time leading scorer with 993 points until the record was broken by future NFL quarterback Ben Roethlisberger.

== College career ==
The 6'9" power forward attended Ohio State University where he was a three-year starter including, as a sophomore in 1967–68, on the team that won the Big Ten Conference championship and made the Final Four in the 1968 NCAA Men's Division I Basketball Tournament. In the Mideast Regional final, he made the winning basket as Ohio State defeated the University of Kentucky at Memorial Coliseum in Lexington, Kentucky, the Wildcats' home arena.

As a junior, he led the Buckeyes in both scoring and rebounding with 23.6 points per game and 10.6 rebounds per game. He was named Honorable Mention All-American and All-Big Ten.

He again led the team in 1969–70 as a senior, averaging 24.2 points and 9.0 rebounds per game. He was again named All-Big Ten.

Sorenson scored 1,622 points, a total that ranked second at the time to Naismith Memorial Basketball Hall of Famer Jerry Lucas' total (1,990). He also grabbed 761 career rebounds, again second to Lucas (1,411) at the time. His career scoring average of 21.1 points per game ranks fifth, his career 9.9 rebounds per game ranks sixth.

== NBA career ==
He was drafted in the second round (26th overall) of the 1970 NBA draft by the Cleveland Cavaliers. His rookie season of 1970-71 was his most productive, as the power forward posted career-high per-game averages of 24.6 minutes played, 11.3 points, 6.2 rebounds and 2.1 assists. On December 19, 1970, he posted a career single-game high of 34 points against the Buffalo Braves. He also scored 30 points on February 9, 1971, against the Los Angeles Lakers.

In 1971-72 his playing time dipped to 15.3 minutes per game as he averaged, 7.0 points and 4.0 rebounds per game. His high-point game was 22 in the final game of the season against the Cincinnati Royals.

The 1972–73 season was his third and final one in the NBA. After 10 games with the Cavaliers, on November 10, 1972, he was traded to the Philadelphia 76ers, for whom he played another 48 games. For the season, he averaged 13.0 minutes per game, 5.4 points and 3.6 rebounds. His most productive game again came in the final game of the season with 20 points against the Detroit Pistons, which was played at Civic Arena in Pittsburgh.

== Personal life ==
He died of cancer at age 54 in 2002. He was survived by his wife, Wanda, and sons Andrew and Stephen.

== Career statistics ==
Legend
GP	Games played	GS	Games started	MPG	Minutes per game
FG%	Field goal percentage	3P%	3-point field goal percentage	FT%	Free throw percentage
RPG	Rebounds per game	APG	Assists per game	SPG	Steals per game
BPG	Blocks per game	PPG	Points per game	**Bold**	Career high

=== NBA ===
==== Regular season ====
Year	Team	GP	GS	MPG	FG%	FT%	RPG	APG	PPG
1970–71	Cleveland	**79**		**24.6**	.445	**.803**	**6.2**	**2.1**	**11.3**
1971–72	Cleveland	76		15.3	.448	.779	4.0	1.1	7.0
1972–73	Cleveland	10		12.9	.244	.455	3.7	.5	2.7
1972–73	Philadelphia	48	0	13.0	**.456**	.747	3.6	.6	5.9
Career		213	0	18.1	.442	.778	4.7	1.3	8.1
