= Al Henry =

American basketball player

Personal information
- Born: February 9, 1949 (age 77)
- Listed height: 6 ft 9 in (2.06 m)
- Listed weight: 190 lb (86 kg)

Career information
- High school: Hamilton (Memphis, Tennessee)
- College: Wisconsin (1967–1970)
- NBA draft: 1970: 1st round, 12th overall pick
- Drafted by: Philadelphia 76ers
- Playing career: 1970–1980
- Position: Center
- Number: 26

Career history
- 1970–1972: Philadelphia 76ers
- 1970–1971: Hamden Bics
- 1972–1974: Hamilton Pat Pavers
- 1974–1975: Cherry Hill Pros
- 1975–1976: Wilkes-Barre Barons
- 1976–1977: Scranton Apollos
- 1977–1979: Wilkes-Barre Barons
- 1979–1980: Lancaster Red Roses

Career highlights
- 2× EBA champion (1977, 1978); All-EBA Second Team (1974)
- Stats at NBA.com
- Stats at Basketball Reference

Albert J. Henry Jr. (born February 9, 1949), is an American retired center who played in the National Basketball Association. He was drafted in the first round of the 1970 NBA draft by the Philadelphia 76ers and would play two seasons with the team.

Henry played in the Eastern Basketball Association (EBA) for the Hamden Bics, Hamilton Pat Pavers, Cherry Hill Pros, Wilkes-Barre Barons, Scranton Apollos and Lancaster Red Roses from 1970 to 1980. He won an EBA championship with the Apollos in 1977 and Barons in 1978. He was selected to the All-EBA Second Team in 1974.

== Career statistics ==
Legend
GP	Games played	GS	Games started	MPG	Minutes per game
FG%	Field goal percentage	3P%	3-point field goal percentage	FT%	Free throw percentage
RPG	Rebounds per game	APG	Assists per game	SPG	Steals per game
BPG	Blocks per game	PPG	Points per game	**Bold**	Career high

=== NBA ===
==== Regular season ====
Year	Team	GP	GS	MPG	FG%	FT%	RPG	APG	PPG
1970–71	Philadelphia	6	0	4.3	.167	**.714**	1.8	.0	1.2
1971–72	Philadelphia	**43**	**1**	**9.8**	**.436**	.699	**3.2**	**.2**	**4.3**
Career		49	1	9.1	.426	.700	3.0	.2	4.0
