= Mike Price (basketball) =

American basketball player (born 1948)

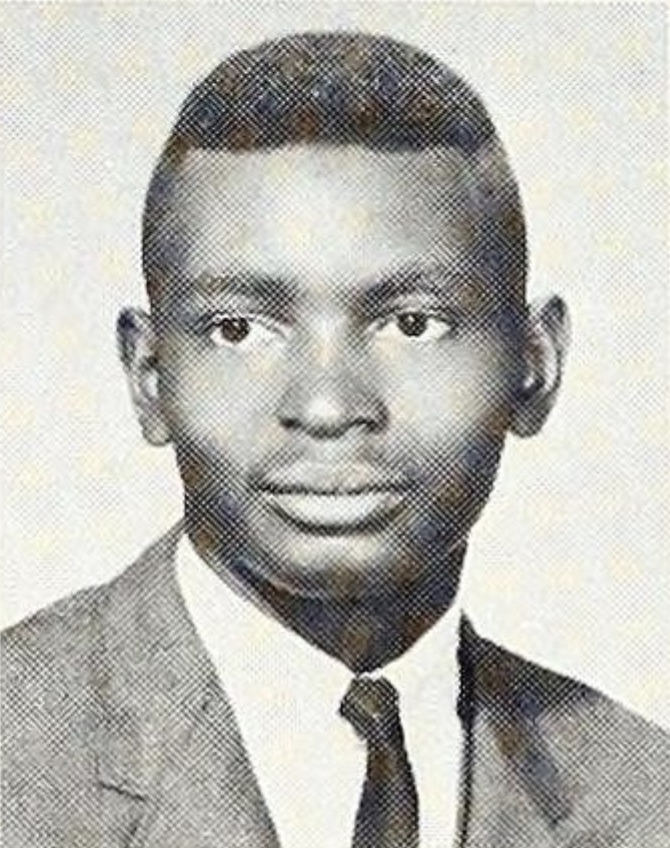
- Price in 1966

Personal information
- Born: September 11, 1948 (age 78) Russellville, Kentucky, U.S.
- Listed height: 6 ft 3 in (1.91 m)
- Listed weight: 200 lb (91 kg)

Career information
- High school: Arsenal Technical (Indianapolis, Indiana)
- College: Illinois (1967–1970)
- NBA draft: 1970: 1st round, 17th overall pick
- Drafted by: New York Knicks
- Position: Shooting guard
- Number: 5, 15, 36

Career history
- 1970–1971: New York Knicks
- 1971–1972: Indiana Pacers
- 1972–1973: Philadelphia 76ers
- Stats at NBA.com
- Stats at Basketball Reference

Michael Price (born September 11, 1948) is an American former professional basketball player. He played for three seasons in the National Basketball Association (NBA) for the New York Knicks and Philadelphia 76ers. Price played college basketball for the Illinois Fighting Illini and was selected in the first round of the 1970 NBA draft by the New York Knicks. He is the older brother of fellow NBA player Jim Price.

== Early life ==
Born in Russellville, Kentucky, Mike Price attended Arsenal Technical High School in Indianapolis, Indiana where he played for Coach Jack Bradford, graduating in 1966.

Price was the leading scorer of Arsenal's state runner-up team. Playing with his younger brother Jim, Price helped lead Arsenal Technical High School to the State Finals in 1966. The Titans finished the season with a 25–4 record. He was named as a 1966 Indiana All-Star and earned All-Sectional and All-Regional honors.

== College career ==
Price played collegiately for Illinois Fighting Illinois from 1967 to 1970.

Playing for coach Harv Schmidt, Price averaged 8.5 points and 5.1 rebounds as a sophomore as Illinois finished 11–13 in 1967–1968.

As a junior in 1968–1969, Price averaged 12.4 points and 6.8 rebounds, as Illinois finished 19–5.

Illinois finished 15–9 in Price's senior year. He averaged 15.0 points and 9.2 rebounds.

Overall, Price averaged 12.0 points and 7.0 rebounds in 70 career games for the Illini.

== Professional career ==
Price was the 17th overall pick by the New York Knicks in the 1970 NBA draft. Price played for the Knicks from 1970 to 1971. He spent time in the United States Army Reserve during the 1971 NBA offseason and returned a month before the season commenced. Price was waived by the Knicks on November 23, 1971. He then played for the Indiana Pacers of the American Basketball Association (ABA) during the 1971–72 season. Price returned to the NBA during the 1972–73 season to play for the Philadelphia 76ers when the team lost an NBA record 73 of 82 games.

He averaged 3.2 points and 1.3 rebounds during his career in the NBA and ABA.

== Career statistics ==
Legend
GP	Games played	GS	Games started	MPG	Minutes per game
FG%	Field goal percentage	3P%	3-point field goal percentage	FT%	Free throw percentage
RPG	Rebounds per game	APG	Assists per game	SPG	Steals per game
BPG	Blocks per game	PPG	Points per game	**Bold**	Career high

=== NBA/ABA ===
==== Regular season ====
Year	Team	GP	GS	MPG	FG%	3P%	FT%	RPG	APG	PPG
1970–71	New York	56	0	4.5	.370		.706	.5	.2	1.5
1971–72	New York	6	0	6.7	.357		**.818**	1.0	1.0	3.2
1971–72	Indiana (ABA)	4		6.3	.333	–	–	1.3	.3	1.5
1972–73	Philadelphia	**57**	**5**	**13.2**	**.415**		.809	**2.1**	**1.2**	**5.1**
Career (NBA)		119	5	8.8	.404		.772	1.3	.7	3.3
Career (overall)		123	5	8.7	.402	–	.772	1.3	.7	3.2

==== Playoffs ====
Year	Team	GP	GS	MPG	FG%	FT%	RPG	APG	PPG
1971	New York	8	0	3.3	.364	.667	.6	.6	1.5

== Honors ==
- University of Illinois Athlete of the Year (1970)
- Price received the George Huff Award for Proficiency in Scholarship and Athletics.
- Price was inducted into the Indiana Basketball Hall of Fame in 2000.
