= 1970–71 Atlanta Hawks season =

NBA professional basketball team season

- Head coach: Richie Guerin
- Arena: Alexander Memorial Coliseum

Results
- Record: 36–46 (.439)
- Place: Division: 2nd (Central); Conference: 5th (Eastern)
- Playoff finish: East Conference Semifinals (eliminated 1–4)
- Stats at Basketball Reference

Local media
- Television: WQXI-TV
- Radio: WQXI

The 1970–71 Atlanta Hawks season was the Hawks' 22nd season in the NBA and third season in Atlanta.

== Offseason ==
=== Draft picks ===
Round	Pick	Player	Position	Nationality	College
1	3	Pete Maravich	SG	United States	LSU
1	14	John Vallely	SG	United States	UCLA
2	31	Dan Hester	C	United States	LSU
4	65	Fred Davis	F	United States	Howard Payne
5	82	Bob Riley	F	United States	Mount St. Mary's

== Roster ==
1970–71 Atlanta Hawks roster
Players

Pos.	No.	Player	Height	Weight	DOB	From
C	8	Walt Bellamy	6 ft 11 in (2.11 m)	225 lb (102 kg)		Indiana
PF	32	Bill Bridges	6 ft 6 in (1.98 m)	228 lb (103 kg)		Kansas
SF	33	Jerry Chambers	6 ft 5 in (1.96 m)	185 lb (84 kg)		Utah
PF	25	Len Chappell	6 ft 8 in (2.03 m)	240 lb (109 kg)		Wake Forest
C	31	Bob Christian	6 ft 10 in (2.08 m)	255 lb (116 kg)		Grambling State
C	24	Jim Davis	6 ft 9 in (2.06 m)	225 lb (102 kg)		Colorado
PG	42	Walt Hazzard	6 ft 2 in (1.88 m)	185 lb (84 kg)		UCLA
SF	23	Lou Hudson	6 ft 5 in (1.96 m)	210 lb (95 kg)		Minnesota
SG	44	Pete Maravich	6 ft 5 in (1.96 m)	197 lb (89 kg)		LSU
SG	40	John Vallely	6 ft 3 in (1.91 m)	185 lb (84 kg)		UCLA
PG	34	Herb White	6 ft 2 in (1.88 m)	195 lb (88 kg)		Georgia

Coaches
Head coach
- Richie Guerin

Legend
- (DP) Unsigned draft pick
- (FA) Free agent
- (S) Suspended
- Injured

== Regular season ==
=== Season standings ===
Central Division	W	L	PCT	GB	Home	Road	Neutral	Div
y-Baltimore Bullets	42	40	.512	–	24–13	16–25	2–2	10–6
x-Atlanta Hawks	36	46	.439	6	21–20	14–26	1–0	9–7
Cincinnati Royals	33	49	.402	9	17–16	11–28	5–5	16–6
Cleveland Cavaliers	15	67	.183	27	11–30	2–37	2–0	1–13

#	Eastern Conference			
#	Team	W	L	PCT
1	z-New York Knicks	52	30	.634
2	y-Baltimore Bullets	42	40	.512
3	x-Philadelphia 76ers	47	35	.573
4	x-Atlanta Hawks	36	46	.439
5	Boston Celtics	44	38	.537
6	Cincinnati Royals	33	49	.402
7	Buffalo Braves	22	60	.268
8	Cleveland Cavaliers	15	67	.183

z – clinched division title
y – clinched division title
x – clinched playoff spot

=== Game log ===
1970–71 game log
Total: 36–46 (home: 0–0; road: 0–0)
October: 0–0 (home: 0–0; road: 0–0)

Game	Date	Team	Score	High points	High rebounds	High assists	Location Attendance	Record
1	October 17	Milwaukee	107–98	Lou Hudson (27)				0–1
2	October 21	San Francisco	100–102	Walt Hazzard (29)	1–1			
3	October 22	@ Detroit	101–120	Pete Maravich (23)	1–2			
4	October 24	Boston	113–109	Lou Hudson (34)	1–3			
5	October 26	@ Cincinnati	107–126	Lou Hudson (28)	1–4			
6	October 31	San Diego	121–117	Jerry Chambers (34)	1–5			

November: 0–0 (home: 0–0; road: 0–0)

Game	Date	Team	Score	High points	High rebounds	High assists	Location Attendance	Record
7	November 1	@ Cleveland	131–107	Lou Hudson (43)	2–5			
8	November 4	Detroit	117–105	Lou Hudson (21)	2–6			
9	November 6	@ Philadelphia	112–118	Bridges, Maravich (20)	2–7			
10	November 7	Phoenix	107–100	Lou Hudson (32)	2–8			
11	November 10	Philadelphia	104–109	Lou Hudson (32)	3–8			
12	November 11	@ Buffalo	118–134	Lou Hudson (21)	3–9			
13	November 13	@ Boston	116–114	Lou Hudson (35)	4–9			
14	November 14	Chicago	120–116	Lou Hudson (36)	4–10			
15	November 17	@ Los Angeles	105–116	Hudson, Maravich (28)	4–11			
16	November 18	@ Portland	131–146	Lou Hudson (49)	4–12			
17	November 21	Baltimore	103–130	Pete Maravich (32)	5–12			
18	November 22	Philadelphia	115–125	Pete Maravich (32)	6–12			
19	November 24	@ New York	119–128	Pete Maravich (40)	6–13			
20	November 25	New York	114–111	Lou Hudson (25)	6–14			
21	November 27	@ San Diego	127–128	Lou Hudson (32)	6–15			
22	November 29	@ Seattle	107–130	Pete Maravich (23)	6–16			

December: 0–0 (home: 0–0; road: 0–0)

Game	Date	Team	Score	High points	High rebounds	High assists	Location Attendance	Record
23	December 1	@ San Francisco	106–113	Lou Hudson (40)	6–17			
24	December 2	@ Phoenix	112–126	Lou Hudson (19)	6–18			
25	December 5	Seattle	100–106	Lou Hudson (35)	7–18			
26	December 8	@ Milwaukee	104–125	Lou Hudson (30)	7–19			
27	December 9	@ Cincinnati	106–118	Hudson, Maravich (32)	7–20			
28	December 11	@ Chicago	86–87	Davis, Maravich (17)	7–21			
29	December 12	Portland	101–107	Bill Bridges (26)	8–21			
30	December 13	Buffalo	91–110	Walt Hazzard (26)	9–21			
31	December 16	San Diego	117–128	Walt Hazzard (31)	10–21			
32	December 18	N Baltimore	112–116	Lou Hudson (29)	11–21			
33	December 19	Los Angeles	116–104	Lou Hudson (31)	11–22			
34	December 22	@ Los Angeles	119–115	Walt Hazzard (32)	12–22			
35	December 23	@ San Diego	102–133	Lou Hudson (30)	12–23			
36	December 25	@ Phoenix	115–127	Lou Hudson (33)	12–24			
37	December 26	Cincinnati	130–118	Lou Hudson (35)	12–25			
38	December 28	San Francisco	115–104	Pete Maravich (29)	12–26			
39	December 29	@ Detroit	97–99	Lou Hudson (19)	12–27			
40	December 31	Cleveland	85–119	Pete Maravich (32)	13–27			

January: 0–0 (home: 0–0; road: 0–0)

Game	Date	Team	Score	High points	High rebounds	High assists	Location Attendance	Record
41	January 2	@ New York	112–108	Walt Bellamy (24)	14–27			
42	January 3	Boston	140–128	Hudson, Maravich (22)	14–28			
43	January 5	Detroit	98–90	Lou Hudson (32)	14–29			
44	January 7	Baltimore	110–102	Lou Hudson (36)	14–30			
45	January 8	@ Baltimore	104–115	Walt Hazzard (27)	14–31			
46	January 10	Phoenix	116–105	Pete Maravich (27)	14–32			
47	January 15	@ Boston	123–134	Pete Maravich (35)	14–33			
48	January 16	Los Angeles	123–127	Walt Hazzard (31)	15–33			
49	January 18	@ Buffalo	123–113	Pete Maravich (41)	16–33			
50	January 20	Seattle	112–108	Walt Hazzard (29)	16–34			
51	January 22	@ Milwaukee	117–110	Walt Bellamy (25)	17–34			
52	January 24	Milwaukee	142–120	Pete Maravich (30)	17–35			
53	January 26	@ Philadelphia	122–129	Pete Maravich (34)	17–36			
54	January 27	New York	116–108	Walt Hazzard (26)	17–37			
55	January 29	Cleveland	111–119	Pete Maravich (38)	18–37			
56	January 31	San Diego	120–131	Walt Hazzard (26)	19–37			

February: 0–0 (home: 0–0; road: 0–0)

Game	Date	Team	Score	High points	High rebounds	High assists	Location Attendance	Record
57	February 2	@ San Francisco	99–101	Pete Maravich (27)	19–38			
58	February 4	@ Portland	123–137	Walt Bellamy (32)	19–39			
59	February 5	@ Seattle	121–120 (OT)	Walt Bellamy (39)	20–39			
60	February 7	Cincinnati	118–121	Lou Hudson (27)	21–39			
61	February 9	@ New York	114–109	Pete Maravich (27)	22–39			
62	February 10	Boston	102–114	Pete Maravich (28)	23–39			
63	February 12	New York	116–125	Walt Bellamy (33)	24–39			
64	February 14	Milwaukee	124–88	Pete Maravich (15)	24–40			
65	February 16	@ Chicago	102–118	Bellamy, Hudson (22)	24–41			
66	February 20	@ Baltimore	122–115	Hudson, Maravich (31)	25–41			
67	February 21	Baltimore	121–119	Walt Bellamy (29)	25–42			
68	February 24	Portland	107–118	Lou Hudson (30)	26–42			
69	February 26	@ Boston	129–136 (OT)	Lou Hudson (37)	26–43			
70	February 27	Buffalo	117–134	Lou Hudson (35)	27–43			
71	February 28	Detroit	106–105	Pete Maravich (30)	27–44			

March: 0–0 (home: 0–0; road: 0–0)

Game	Date	Team	Score	High points	High rebounds	High assists	Location Attendance	Record
72	March 2	@ Seattle	128–116	Lou Hudson (34)	28–44			
73	March 3	@ San Francisco	109–105	Pete Maravich (33)	29–44			
74	March 5	@ Los Angeles	105–104	Lou Hudson (30)	30–44			
75	March 7	Cincinnati	112–122	Hudson, Maravich (30)	31–44			
76	March 10	Phoenix	98–139	Pete Maravich (37)	32–44			
77	March 12	@ Cleveland	119–107	Pete Maravich (28)	33–44			
78	March 13	@ Cincinnati	127–136	Pete Maravich (44)	33–45			
79	March 14	Philadelphia	101–108	Pete Maravich (25)	34–45			
80	March 16	@ Philadelphia	130–125	Lou Hudson (43)	35–45			
81	March 19	Chicago	111–112 (OT)	Hudson, Maravich (22)	36–45			
82	March 20	@ Chicago	121–138	Jerry Chambers (27)	36–46			

1970–71 schedule

== Playoffs ==
1971 playoff game log
Conference Semifinals: 1–4 (home: 0–2; road: 1–2)

Game	Date	Team	Score	High points	High rebounds	High assists	Location Attendance	Series
1	March 25	@ New York	L 101–112	Pete Maravich (23)	Bill Bridges (13)	Hazzard, Maravich (5)	Madison Square Garden; 19,500	0–1
2	March 27	@ New York	W 113–104	Lou Hudson (35)	Bill Bridges (36)	Pete Maravich (5)	Madison Square Garden; 19,500	1–1
3	March 28	New York	L 95–110	Walt Bellamy (29)	Walt Bellamy (18)	Walt Hazzard (7)	Alexander Memorial Coliseum; 7,192	1–2
4	March 30	New York	L 107–113	Walt Bellamy (25)	Bill Bridges (18)	Walt Hazzard (9)	Alexander Memorial Coliseum; 7,192	1–3
5	April 1	@ New York	L 107–111	Lou Hudson (29)	Bellamy, Bridges (20)	Walt Bellamy (5)	Madison Square Garden; 19,500	1–4

1971 schedule

== Awards and records ==
- Pete Maravich, NBA All-Rookie Team 1st Team
