= 1970–71 Baltimore Bullets season =

NBA professional basketball team season

- Conference champions
- Division champions
- Head coach: Gene Shue
- Arena: Baltimore Civic Center

Results
- Record: 42–40 (.512)
- Place: Division: 1st (Central); Conference: 2nd (Eastern)
- Playoff finish: NBA Finals (lost to Bucks 0–4)
- Stats at Basketball Reference

Local media
- Television: WBAL-TV
- Radio: WBAL

The 1970–71 season was the 10th season of the Baltimore Bullets in the NBA and eighth season under the Baltimore Bullets name. This would be its first year in the newly created Central Division inside the Eastern Conference. Despite playing close to .500 basketball all season, the Bullets would capture the Central Division with a 42–40 record.

Despite their pedestrian season, the Bullets would knock off the higher-seeded Philadelphia 76ers and established rival New York Knicks in seven games apiece to advance to their first NBA championship, where they were swept in four straight by the Milwaukee Bucks. This would be the only Finals appearance for the Bullets/Wizards franchise while based in Baltimore; the next time they would advance to the Finals would come four years later, in 1975, by which point the franchise moved to Washington, D.C.

== Draft picks ==
The Baltimore Bullets made seventeen selections in the 1970 NBA draft.

Round	Pick	Player	Position	Nationality	College/Club team
1	9	George E. Johnson		United States	Stephen F. Austin
3	49	Seaburn Hill		United States	Arizona State
4	54	Bill Stricker		United States	Pacific
4	66	Billy Jones		United States	Louisiana College
5	83	Gary Zeller		United States	Drake
6	100	Marvin Polnick		United States	Stephen F. Austin
7	117	Charlie Wallace		United States	Oklahoma City
8	134	Tom Dyksera		United States	Wheaton (IL)
9	151	Will Hetzel		United States	Maryland
10	168	Ron Becker		United States	New Mexico Lobos
11	183	Mel Bell		United States	Houston
12	193	Ben McGilmer		United States	Iowa
13	203	Dan Debardabi		United States	Northern Arizona
14	213	Mike Williams		United States	Northern Arizona
15	222	Ted Rose		United States	Northern Michigan
16	229	Don Rather		United States	Northern Arizona
17	233	Vince Fritz		United States	Oregon State

== Roster ==
1970–71 Baltimore Bullets roster
Players

Pos.	No.	Player	Height	Weight	DOB	From
PF	12	Jim Barnes	6 ft 8 in (2.03 m)	210 lb (95 kg)	1941–04–13	UTEP
G	3	Fred Carter	6 ft 3 in (1.91 m)	185 lb (84 kg)	1945–02–14	Mount St. Mary's
F	31	George E. Johnson	6 ft 11 in (2.11 m)	245 lb (111 kg)	1947–06–19	Stephen F. Austin
F	25	Gus Johnson	6 ft 6 in (1.98 m)	230 lb (104 kg)	1938–12–13	Idaho
G	22	Kevin Loughery	6 ft 3 in (1.91 m)	190 lb (86 kg)	1940–03–28	St. John's
F	24	Jack Marin	6 ft 6 in (1.98 m)	210 lb (95 kg)	1944–10–12	Duke
G	15	Eddie Miles	6 ft 4 in (1.93 m)	195 lb (88 kg)	1940–07–05	Seattle
G	10	Earl Monroe	6 ft 3 in (1.91 m)	185 lb (84 kg)	1944–11–21	Winston-Salem State
PF	40	Dorie Murrey	6 ft 8 in (2.03 m)	229 lb (104 kg)	1943–09–07	Detroit Mercy
F	40	Dennis Stewart	6 ft 6 in (1.98 m)	220 lb (100 kg)	1947–04–11	Michigan
PF	12	John Tresvant	6 ft 7 in (2.01 m)	215 lb (98 kg)	1939–11–06	Seattle
SF	35	Al Tucker	6 ft 8 in (2.03 m)	190 lb (86 kg)	1943–02–24	Oklahoma Baptist
F	41	Wes Unseld	6 ft 7 in (2.01 m)	245 lb (111 kg)	1946–03–14	Louisville
G	11	Gary Zeller	6 ft 3 in (1.91 m)	205 lb (93 kg)	1947–11–20	Drake

Coaches
Head coach
- Gene Shue
Assistant(s)
- Bob Ferry

Legend
- (DP) Unsigned draft pick
- (FA) Free agent
- (S) Suspended
- Injured

Roster

== Regular season ==
=== Season standings ===
Central Division	W	L	PCT	GB	Home	Road	Neutral	Div
y-Baltimore Bullets	42	40	.512	–	24–13	16–25	2–2	10–6
x-Atlanta Hawks	36	46	.439	6	21–20	14–26	1–0	9–7
Cincinnati Royals	33	49	.402	9	17–16	11–28	5–5	16–6
Cleveland Cavaliers	15	67	.183	27	11–30	2–37	2–0	1–13

#	Eastern Conference			
#	Team	W	L	PCT
1	z-New York Knicks	52	30	.634
2	y-Baltimore Bullets	42	40	.512
3	x-Philadelphia 76ers	47	35	.573
4	x-Atlanta Hawks	36	46	.439
5	Boston Celtics	44	38	.537
6	Cincinnati Royals	33	49	.402
7	Buffalo Braves	22	60	.268
8	Cleveland Cavaliers	15	67	.183

=== Game log ===
1970–71 game log
#	Date	Opponent	Score	High points	Record
1	October 14	San Diego	W 123–105	Jack Marin (28)	1–0
2	October 17	Los Angeles	W 118–116 (OT)	Jack Marin (25)	2–0
3	October 20	San Francisco	L 105–125	Fred Carter (24)	2–1
4	October 21	@ Cincinnati	W 117–105	Gus Johnson (27)	3–1
5	October 23	New York	W 98–92	Carter, Monroe (21)	4–1
6	October 24	@ Milwaukee	L 120–122 (2OT)	Wes Unseld (27)	4–2
7	October 28	Detroit	L 103–109	Marin, Unseld (21)	4–3
8	October 30	@ Philadelphia	W 123–110	Earl Monroe (30)	5–3
9	October 31	Phoenix	W 106–103	Kevin Loughery (21)	6–3
10	November 4	@ San Francisco	L 100–111	Earl Monroe (30)	6–4
11	November 5	@ Portland	L 131–135	Gus Johnson (43)	6–5
12	November 6	@ San Diego	W 125–118	Earl Monroe (27)	7–5
13	November 8	@ Los Angeles	L 105–124	Gus Johnson (28)	7–6
14	November 1	Philadelphia	L 107–119	Wes Unseld (28)	7–7
15	November 12	@ New York	W 110–108	Eddie Miles (25)	8–7
16	November 14	Boston	W 122–101	Eddie Miles (22)	9–7
17	November 15	@ Milwaukee	L 90–105	Jack Marin (20)	9–8
18	November 16	Cleveland	W 98–86	Gus Johnson (33)	10–8
19	November 18	@ Cleveland	W 111–98	Kevin Loughery (20)	11–8
20	November 20	Phoenix	W 121–110	Earl Monroe (30)	12–8
21	November 21	@ Atlanta	L 103–130	Johnson, Miles, Monroe (16)	12–9
22	November 24	Portland	W 156–104	Jack Marin (25)	13–9
23	November 27	@ Boston	L 107–153	Gus Johnson (22)	13–10
24	November 28	Chicago	W 99–91	Gus Johnson (21)	14–10
25	November 30	@ Philadelphia	L 98–104	Gus Johnson (20)	14–11
26	December 1	Los Angeles	L 93–97	Earl Monroe (33)	14–12
27	December 4	Seattle	W 131–116	Johnson, Marin (28)	15–12
28	December 6	Cincinnati	W 126–118	Earl Monroe (28)	16–12
29	December 9	Milwaukee	W 127–97	Marin, Unseld (25)	17–12
30	December 12	San Francisco	W 119–96	Earl Monroe (32)	18–12
31	December 15	@ Chicago	L 97–115	Jack Marin (25)	18–13
32	December 18	vs. Atlanta	L 112–116	Earl Monroe (24)	18–14
33	December 19	Boston	W 134–128	Gus Johnson (30)	19–14
34	December 23	@ Cincinnati	L 115–120	Earl Monroe (37)	19–15
35	December 25	Chicago	W 128–112	Earl Monroe (25)	20–15
36	December 27	@ New York	L 105–110	Earl Monroe (31)	20–16
37	December 30	vs. Buffalo	W 106–90	Jack Marin (24)	21–16
38	January 1	@ Cleveland	W 128–105	Marin, Monroe (22)	22–16
39	January 2	@ Detroit	W 108–99	Jack Marin (29)	23–16
40	January 5	Seattle	W 109–101	Johnson, Monroe (24)	24–16
41	January 7	@ Atlanta	W 110–102	Earl Monroe (32)	25–16
42	January 8	Atlanta	W 115–104	Gus Johnson (31)	26–16
43	January 10	@ Milwaukee	L 99–151	Gus Johnson (17)	26–17
44	January 14	@ Seattle	L 110–114	Earl Monroe (22)	26–18
45	January 15	@ San Diego	W 124–117	Jack Marin (29)	27–18
46	January 16	@ Phoenix	L 100–117	Earl Monroe (23)	27–19
47	January 17	@ Seattle	W 111–96	Fred Carter (22)	28–19
48	January 20	Milwaukee	L 116–120	Earl Monroe (24)	28–20
49	January 22	@ Boston	W 136–117	Earl Monroe (26)	29–20
50	January 23	San Diego	W 120–127	Gus Johnson (31)	30–20
51	January 26	San Francisco	W 103–98	Earl Monroe (26)	31–20
52	January 27	@ Cincinnati	L 113–115	Jack Marin (26)	31–21
53	January 29	Cincinnati	W 145–118	Jack Marin (22)	32–21
54	January 31	vs. New York	L 95–125	Earl Monroe (25)	32–22
55	February 2	@ Detroit	L 113–116	Earl Monroe (30)	32–23
56	February 3	Chicago	L 102–124	Earl Monroe (19)	32–24
57	February 5	@ Buffalo	W 98–90	Fred Carter (29)	33–24
58	February 7	Detroit	W 108–105	Earl Monroe (25)	34–24
59	February 9	Phoenix	L 115–120	Earl Monroe (38)	34–25
60	February 12	Boston	L 109–113 (OT)	Jack Marin (24)	34–26
61	February 14	vs. Philadelphia	W 112–103	Earl Monroe (33)	35–26
62	February 16	@ Detroit	L 95–110	Wes Unseld (25)	35–27
63	February 17	Buffalo	L 114–118	Earl Monroe (26)	35–28
64	February 19	@ Buffalo	W 120–113	Earl Monroe (34)	36–28
65	February 20	Atlanta	L 115–122	Earl Monroe (33)	36–29
66	February 21	@ Atlanta	W 121–119	Jack Marin (34)	37–29
67	February 23	Los Angeles	L 107–114	Wes Unseld (28)	37–30
68	February 26	Portland	W 114–97	Kevin Loughery (26)	38–30
69	February 28	New York	L 104–110	Fred Carter (30)	38–31
70	March 2	@ New York	L 95–109	Earl Monroe (22)	38–32
71	March 3	Cincinnati	L 132–133 (OT)	Fred Carter (33)	38–33
72	March 6	@ San Francisco	L 103–109	Jack Marin (29)	38–34
73	March 7	@ Phoenix	W 117–108	Jack Marin (28)	39–34
74	March 9	@ Los Angeles	W 107–95	Earl Monroe (25)	40–34
75	March 11	@ Portland	L 118–136	Fred Carter (24)	40–35
76	March 13	@ San Diego	L 115–121	Jack Marin (27)	40–36
77	March 14	@ Seattle	L 121–124	Earl Monroe (29)	40–37
78	March 16	@ Chicago	L 99–113	Earl Monroe (24)	40–38
79	March 17	Cleveland	L 109–113	Earl Monroe (32)	41–38
80	March 19	@ Boston	L 117–125	Kevin Loughery (32)	41–39
81	March 20	Philadelphia	W 124–112	Kevin Loughery (32)	42–39
82	March 21	@ Philadelphia	L 108–120	Kevin Loughery (24)	42–40

== Playoffs ==
In the playoffs the Bullets would get off to a quick start as they grabbed a 3–1 series lead over the Philadelphia 76ers. However, the Bullets would find themselves in a 7th game and that game the Bullets would emerge victorious 128–120. The Bullets would face the New York Knicks in the Eastern Conference finals. The Bullets would finally break through in Game 5 and break the tie in the series by beating the Knicks at Madison Square Garden 89–84. The Bullets would have a chance to close the series out at home, but the Knicks would bounce back with a 113–96 win to force a 7th and deciding game in New York. In the seventh game, the Bullets would triumph, winning in New York by 2 points to reach the NBA Finals. However, the Bullets would be swept in 4 straight games by the Milwaukee Bucks.

1971 playoff game log
Conference semifinals: 4–3 (home: 2–2; road: 2–1)

Game	Date	Team	Score	High points	High rebounds	High assists	Location Attendance	Series
1	March 24	Philadelphia	L 112–126	Loughery, Gus Johnson (19)	Wes Unseld (20)	Kevin Loughery (4)	Baltimore Civic Center; 6,707	0–1
2	March 26	@ Philadelphia	W 119–107	Marin, Monroe (24)	Wes Unseld (18)	Earl Monroe (6)	Spectrum; 10,369	1–1
3	March 28	Philadelphia	W 111–103	Earl Monroe (29)	Wes Unseld (24)	Kevin Loughery (7)	Baltimore Civic Center; 5,589	2–1
4	March 30	@ Philadelphia	W 120–105	Jack Marin (27)	Gus Johnson (14)	Earl Monroe (6)	Spectrum; 8,909	3–1
5	April 1	Philadelphia	L 103–104	Earl Monroe (26)	Wes Unseld (18)	Kevin Loughery (5)	Baltimore Civic Center; 10,998	3–2
6	April 3	@ Philadelphia	L 94–98	Earl Monroe (30)	Wes Unseld (18)	Kevin Loughery (5)	Spectrum; 7,059	3–3
7	April 4	Philadelphia	W 128–120	Jack Marin (33)	Wes Unseld (22)	Gus Johnson (8)	Baltimore Civic Center; 6,662	4–3

Conference finals: 4–3 (home: 3–0; road: 1–3)

Game	Date	Team	Score	High points	High rebounds	High assists	Location Attendance	Series
1	April 6	@ New York	L 111–112	Earl Monroe (29)	Wes Unseld (22)	Earl Monroe (4)	Madison Square Garden; 19,500	0–1
2	April 9	@ New York	L 88–107	John Tresvant (20)	Wes Unseld (20)	Kevin Loughery (16)	Madison Square Garden; 19,500	0–2
3	April 11	New York	W 114–88	Earl Monroe (31)	Wes Unseld (26)	Wes Unseld (9)	Baltimore Civic Center; 8,083	1–2
4	April 14	New York	W 101–80	Jack Marin (27)	John Tresvant (17)	Wes Unseld (6)	Baltimore Civic Center; 12,289	2–2
5	April 16	@ New York	L 84–89	Jack Marin (25)	John Tresvant (17)	Wes Unseld (3)	Madison Square Garden; 19,500	2–3
6	April 18	New York	W 113–96	Earl Monroe (27)	Wes Unseld (15)	Earl Monroe (7)	Baltimore Civic Center; 11,211	3–3
7	April 19	@ New York	W 93–91	Earl Monroe (26)	Wes Unseld (20)	Earl Monroe (6)	Madison Square Garden; 19,500	4–3

NBA Finals: 0–4 (home: 0–2; road: 0–2)

Game	Date	Team	Score	High points	High rebounds	High assists	Location Attendance	Series
1	April 21	@ Milwaukee	L 88–98	Earl Monroe (26)	John Tresvant (14)	Fred Carter (4)	Milwaukee Arena; 10,746	0–1
2	April 25	Milwaukee	L 83–102	Jack Marin (22)	Wes Unseld (20)	Earl Monroe (6)	Baltimore Civic Center; 12,289	0–2
3	April 28	@ Milwaukee	L 99–107	Jack Marin (21)	Wes Unseld (23)	Wes Unseld (6)	Milwaukee Arena; 10,746	0–3
4	April 30	Milwaukee	L 106–118	Fred Carter (28)	Wes Unseld (23)	Wes Unseld (10)	Baltimore Civic Center; 11,842	0–4

1971 schedule

== Awards and honors ==
- Gus Johnson, All-NBA Second Team
- Gus Johnson, NBA All-Defensive First Team
