= 1970–71 Buffalo Braves season =

NBA professional basketball team season (1st season)

- Head coach: Dolph Schayes
- Arena: Buffalo Memorial Auditorium

Results
- Record: 22–60 (.268)
- Place: Division: 4th (Atlantic); Conference: 7th (Eastern)
- Playoff finish: Did not qualify
- Stats at Basketball Reference

Local media
- Television: WBEN-TV
- Radio: WBEN

The 1970–71 NBA season was the Buffalo Braves inaugural season in the NBA. With a roster made up primarily of castoffs, the Braves got off on the right foot by beating the Cleveland Cavaliers 107–92 at the Buffalo Memorial Auditorium on October 14. However, the Braves would drop their next nine as they took on established NBA teams on the way to finishing in last place in the Atlantic Division. The Braves' record was 22–60, which was 7 games better than the Cleveland Cavaliers, their partners in expansion. This was the only season that the team would wear blue, red, and gold, as the following season saw them change their jerseys to black and orange, which they would wear for the next two seasons.

== Offseason ==
=== NBA draft ===
The 1970 NBA draft was held on March 23, 1970, in New York City. The Braves first ever draft pick was John Hummer from Princeton, as he was selected with the 15th overall selection at the 1970 NBA draft. Hummer, a 6'9" center from Washington, DC, averaged 17.5 points per game in 25 games with the Tigers during the 1969–70 season. Hummer led Princeton with a .487 field goal percentage, as well as leading the team with 9.5 rebounds per game.

Cornell Warner was selected by Buffalo in the second round, 24th overall. Warner, another center, played for Jackson State University from 1967 to 1970.

Round	Pick	Player	Position	Nationality	College
1	15	John Hummer	Center	United States	Princeton
2	24	Cornell Warner	Center	United States	Jackson State
3	43	Chip Case	Forward	United States	Virginia
4	58	Ervin Polnick	Forward	United States	Austin State
5	77	Robert Moore	Guard	United States	Central State
6	92	Doug Hess	Center	United States	Toledo
7	111	Cliff Shegogg	Forward	United States	Colorado State
8	126	Larry Woods	Guard	United States	West Virginia
9	145	Larry Duckworth	Center	United States	Henderson State
10	160	Joe Taylor	Forward	United States	Dillard
11	177	Dick Walker	Guard	United States	Wake Forest

=== Expansion draft ===
The 1970 NBA expansion draft was held on May 11, 1970, with the Braves and two other expansion franchises, the Cleveland Cavaliers and the Portland Trail Blazers participating in the event.

The Braves most notable selection was power forward Bailey Howell from the Boston Celtics. Howell was a six time NBA all-star, however, immediately after the draft, he was traded to the Philadelphia 76ers in exchange for power forward Bob Kauffman, who had played the 1969-70 season with the Chicago Bulls. Kauffman saw limited playing time with the Bulls, averaging 4.3 points per game while averaging 12.1 minutes per game in 64 games with Chicago.

Another selection was 10-year NBA veteran, forward/center Ray Scott from the Baltimore Bullets. The Braves management were looking forward to his leadership on the team; however, due to contradictory language in his Baltimore contract that provided him a loophole to become a free agent after the 1969-70 NBA season. The Braves did not exercise his option under the reserve clause because they believed it was a two-year contract. Scott was free to sign with the Virginia Squires in the American Basketball Association. The league compensated the Braves due to losing a chosen player from Expansion Draft by promoting their 3rd round pick to a 2nd round pick (24th overall) in the 1971 NBA Draft.

Player	Position	Team
Emmette Bryant	Guard	Boston Celtics
Freddie Crawford	Guard	Milwaukee Bucks
Dick Garrett	Guard	L.A. Lakers
Herm Gilliam	Guard	Cincinnati Royals
Bill Hosket	Forward	New York Knicks
Bailey Howell	Forward	Boston Celtics
Paul Long	Guard	Detroit Pistons
Mike Lynn	Guard	Los Angeles Lakers
Don May	Guard	New York Knicks
Ray Scott	Center	Baltimore Bullets
George Wilson	Forward	Philadelphia 76ers

== Roster ==
1970–71 Buffalo Braves roster
Players

Pos.	No.	Player	Height	Weight	DOB	From
C	17	Nate Bowman	6 ft 10 in (2.08 m)	230 lb (104 kg)		Wichita State
G	7	Emmette Bryant	6 ft 1 in (1.85 m)	175 lb (79 kg)		DePaul
G	15	Freddie Crawford	6 ft 4 in (1.93 m)	190 lb (86 kg)		St. Bonaventure
G	13	Mike Davis	6 ft 3 in (1.91 m)	185 lb (84 kg)		Virginia Union
G	20	Dick Garrett	6 ft 3 in (1.91 m)	185 lb (84 kg)		Southern Illinois
G	9	Herm Gilliam	6 ft 3 in (1.91 m)	190 lb (86 kg)		Purdue
F	25	Bill Hosket	6 ft 7 in (2.01 m)	228 lb (103 kg)		Ohio State
C	45	John Hummer	6 ft 9 in (2.06 m)	230 lb (104 kg)		Princeton
F	44	Bob Kauffman	6 ft 8 in (2.03 m)	240 lb (109 kg)		Guilford
G	5	Paul Long	6 ft 2 in (1.88 m)	180 lb (82 kg)		Wake Forest
F	19	Mike Lynn (injured)	6 ft 7 in (2.01 m)	215 lb (98 kg)		UCLA
F	22	Don May	6 ft 4 in (1.93 m)	220 lb (100 kg)		Dayton
F	4	Mike Silliman	6 ft 6 in (1.98 m)	225 lb (102 kg)		Army
C	35	Cornell Warner	6 ft 9 in (2.06 m)	220 lb (100 kg)		Jackson State
F	33	George Wilson	6 ft 8 in (2.03 m)	225 lb (102 kg)		Cincinnati

Coaches
Head coach
- Dolph Schayes
Assistant(s)
- Johnny McCarthy

Legend
- (DP) Unsigned draft pick
- (FA) Free agent
- (S) Suspended
- Injured

Roster

=== Roster notes ===
- Forward Mike Silliman originally donned jersey #27 but later switched to #4.
- Guard Freddie Crawford played in only 15 games before he was traded away to the Philadelphia 76ers in November.

== Regular season ==
=== October ===
The Braves won their first game in franchise history, defeating the Cleveland Cavaliers 107–92 at the Buffalo Memorial Auditorium on October 14, 1970. Don May led Buffalo with 24 points in the historic victory. This would be the Braves only victory in the month of October, as they closed out the month on a six-game losing streak. On October 24, May scored 34 points in a 114–95 loss to the Detroit Pistons. Buffalo had a 1–6 record during the month, sitting in last place in the Atlantic Division, six games behind the first place New York Knicks.

=== November ===
Buffalo dropped their first three games of November, extending their losing skid to nine games and dropping the team to a 1–9 record. The Braves snapped their losing streak with a 103–91 victory over the Cleveland Cavaliers on November 7, which was the second time Buffalo had defeated Cleveland in the season. Bob Kauffman led the way for Buffalo with 24 points in 30 minutes. In their following game, Buffalo won consecutive games for the first time in team history, defeating the Atlanta Hawks 134–118, as Kauffman scored 35 points to lead the team, while Bill Hosket grabbed 17 rebounds. After dropping their next two games, the Braves returned to the win column with a 112–103 win over the Seattle SuperSonics on November 16, as Don May led the team in scoring with 25 points and John Hummer recorded a double-double with 10 points and 12 rebounds. On the next night, the Braves won their first ever road game, as they defeated the Portland Trail Blazers 102–101. The Braves struggled during the rest of the month, earning a 2–5 record over their remaining seven games, with wins over the Phoenix Suns and Portland Trail Blazers. In their win over Phoenix, Kauffman recorded a triple-double, as he scored 26 points, grabbed 17 rebounds, and recorded 11 assists in the 112–106 win.

The Braves finished November with a 6–10 record during the month. Overall, their record was 7–16, as the club remained in the Atlantic Division cellar, 11 games behind the first place New York Knicks. Also during this time, the Braves traded guard Freddie Crawford to the Philadelphia 76ers for a future draft pick.

=== December ===
Buffalo began December with a narrow 117–116 loss to the Boston Celtics. The Braves returned to the win column on December 4, defeating the powerful New York Knicks 97–91, as Dick Garrett led the team with 23 points and 10 rebounds. Bob Kauffman scored 22 points and recorded 13 rebounds, while Don May scored 20 points with 10 rebounds in the win. Following the victory over New York, the Braves lost their next five games. In the Braves 108–106 loss to the Cleveland Cavaliers, Kauffman scored 40 points, which was the first time in team history that a player reached 40 points in a game. On December 12, the Braves returned to the win column, beating the Detroit Pistons 93–92. After a loss to Atlanta in their next game, the Braves defeated the Los Angeles Lakers 113–111 in overtime, as Kauffman led the way with 34 points and 11 rebounds. The Braves lost their next game against Boston, but returned to the win column in their following game, crushing the Cleveland Cavaliers 113–94. In their win, six different Braves players recorded 10 or more points. Buffalo struggled for the remainder of the month, losing their final seven games of December.

The club recorded a 4–15 record in December, bringing their overall win–loss record to 11–31 at the end of the month. The Braves continued to be in last place in the Atlantic Division, 20 games behind the first place New York Knicks.

=== January ===
Buffalo lost their first game of the new year, losing 115–103 to the Cincinnati Royals, extending their losing skid to eight games. In their next game, the Braves halted their losing streak with a 115–108 victory over the San Francisco Warriors, as Bob Kauffman led the way with 20 points and 17 rebounds. Following the win over the Warriors, the Braves lost their next three games, including a 141–113 blowout loss to the Chicago Bulls. Buffalo ended their losing streak with an impressive 119–113 win over the Portland Trail Blazers, in which eight players scored double digits in points for the Braves. Buffalo then lost their next four games, including an embarrassing 111–79 loss to the Cleveland Cavaliers. The club responded with a three-game winning streak after that loss to Cleveland, as the Braves defeated the Portland Trail Blazers twice, as well as a win over the San Diego Rockets. Buffalo then concluded January on a five-game road trip, in which they lost every game.

Buffalo earned a record of 5-13 during the month of January. Overall, the Braves were 16–44, falling to 24.5 games behind the Atlantic Division leaders, the New York Knicks.

=== February ===
Buffalo began February with two more losses in a row, extending their losing skid to seven games. The club ended their losing streak with a 106–99 victory over the New York Knicks, which was the Braves second victory over New York during the season, as Buffalo was led by Don May and his 29 points. In their following game, the Braves defeated the Cleveland Cavaliers 111–106, as May led the team with 35 points. Following their two-game winning streak, Buffalo would end the month by dropping seven of their remaining eight games. Their lone win was a 118-114 decision over the Washington Bullets on February 17.

The Braves finished February with a 3–9 record, dropping their overall win–loss record to 19–53, remaining in the Atlantic Division cellar and dropping to 27 games behind the first place New York Knicks.

=== March ===
The Braves began March with a 131–118 loss to the Los Angeles Lakers. In the loss, Don May scored 40 points for Buffalo. In their next game, Buffalo dropped a close 116–113 game to the Milwaukee Bucks, extending their losing streak to seven games. The Braves ended their losing streak and won their twentieth game of the season with a 120–109 victory over the Cleveland Cavaliers on March 6. In their following game, the Braves defeated the Portland Trail Blazers 114–98 to win consecutive games for the first time since the middle of February. After a loss to the San Diego Rockets, the Braves defeated the Los Angeles Lakers on the road 116–109 as seven different players earned 10 or more points for the Braves. Buffalo would finish the season with four straight losses.

The Braves finished March with a 3–7 record, bringing their final regular season win–loss record to 22–60, finishing in fourth place in the four team Atlantic Division, 30 games behind the first place New York Knicks.

=== Season standings ===
Atlantic Division	W	L	PCT	GB	Home	Road	Neutral	Div
y-New York Knicks	52	30	.634	–	32–9	19–20	1–1	10–6
x-Philadelphia 76ers	47	35	.573	5	24–15	21–18	2–2	10–6
Boston Celtics	44	38	.537	8	25–14	18–22	1–2	8–8
Buffalo Braves	22	60	.268	30	14–23	6–30	2–7	2–10

#	Eastern Conference			
#	Team	W	L	PCT
1	z-New York Knicks	52	30	.634
2	y-Baltimore Bullets	42	40	.512
3	x-Philadelphia 76ers	47	35	.573
4	x-Atlanta Hawks	36	46	.439
5	Boston Celtics	44	38	.537
6	Cincinnati Royals	33	49	.402
7	Buffalo Braves	22	60	.268
8	Cleveland Cavaliers	15	67	.183

=== Game log ===
1970–71 Game log
#	Date	Opponent	Score	High points	Record
1	October 14	Cleveland	92–107	Don May (24)	1–0
2	October 17	San Diego	102–93	George Wilson (18)	1–1
3	October 20	Philadelphia	98–89	Em Bryant (19)	1–2
4	October 24	Detroit	114–95	Don May (34)	1–3
5	October 27	@ Portland	108–119	John Hummer (23)	1–4
6	October 30	@ Los Angeles	90–104	Don May (22)	1–5
7	October 31	@ Portland	102–107	Don May (24)	1–6
8	November 2	@ Phoenix	102–110	Mike Davis (21)	1–7
9	November 4	Seattle	126–101	Don May (23)	1–8
10	November 5	@ Detroit	109–121	Mike Davis (32)	1–9
11	November 7	Cleveland	91–103	Bob Kauffman (24)	2–9
12	November 11	Atlanta	118–134	Bob Kauffman (35)	3–9
13	November 13	@ Philadelphia	111–119	Bob Kauffman (28)	3–10
14	November 14	Milwaukee	116–107	Bob Kauffman (23)	3–11
15	November 16	N Seattle	103–112	Don May (25)	4–11
16	November 17	@ Portland	102–101	Bob Kauffman (24)	5–11
17	November 20	@ San Francisco	108–123	Don May (24)	5–12
18	November 21	N Portland	112–108	Don May (30)	5–13
19	November 24	Phoenix	106–112	Bryant, Kauffman (26)	6–13
20	November 25	N Philadelphia	99–92	Bob Kauffman (26)	6–14
21	November 27	@ Chicago	104–121	Garrett, Kauffman (16)	6–15
22	November 28	Portland	95–111	Bob Kauffman (24)	7–15
23	November 30	N Boston	106–109	Mike Davis (31)	7–16
24	December 1	Boston	117–116 (OT)	Bob Kauffman (28)	7–17
25	December 4	New York	91–97	Dick Garrett (23)	8–17
26	December 5	@ New York	93–117	Bob Kauffman (18)	8–18
27	December 6	@ Cleveland	106–108	Bob Kauffman (40)	8–19
28	December 8	Boston	122–102	Bob Kauffman (28)	8–20
29	December 10	N Chicago	138–120	Bob Kauffman (31)	8–21
30	December 11	Portland	120–105	Bob Kauffman (23)	8–22
31	December 12	@ Detroit	93–92	John Hummer (24)	9–22
32	December 13	@ Atlanta	91–110	John Hummer (22)	9–23
33	December 15	Los Angeles	111–113 (OT)	Bob Kauffman (34)	10–23
34	December 17	@ Boston	93–102	Bob Kauffman (25)	10–24
35	December 18	Cleveland	94–113	Davis, Kauffman (19)	11–24
36	December 19	@ Cleveland	112–123	Herm Gilliam (28)	11–25
37	December 20	@ Milwaukee	101–131	Mike Davis (23)	11–26
38	December 23	Chicago	104–103	Don May (27)	11–27
39	December 25	@ New York	102–115	Bob Kauffman (28)	11–28
40	December 26	@ Cleveland	107–120	Don May (28)	11–29
41	December 29	Philadelphia	124–113	Bob Kauffman (22)	11–30
42	December 30	N Baltimore	90–106	Bob Kauffman (26)	11–31
43	January 2	Cincinnati	115–103	Dick Garrett (28)	11–32
44	January 6	San Francisco	108–115	Bob Kauffman (20)	12–32
45	January 8	Seattle	110–102	Don May (30)	12–33
46	January 9	@ Cleveland	89–111	Dick Garrett (17)	12–34
47	January 10	@ Chicago	113–141	Don May (23)	12–35
48	January 14	N Portland	113–119	Bob Kauffman (30)	13–35
49	January 15	Detroit	99–97 (OT)	Bob Kauffman (28)	13–36
50	January 16	@ Cincinnati	113–114	Mike Davis (22)	13–37
51	January 18	Atlanta	123–113	Bob Kauffman (27)	13–38
52	January 19	N Cleveland	111–79	Mike Davis (16)	13–39
53	January 20	Portland	106–126	Dick Garrett (27)	14–39
54	January 22	San Diego	94–101	Don May (29)	15–39
55	January 24	Portland	111–123	Bob Kauffman (30)	16–39
56	January 25	@ San Diego	106–114	Bob Kauffman (26)	16–40
57	January 26	@ Phoenix	82–114	Paul Long (19)	16–41
58	January 28	@ Seattle	110–120	Bob Kauffman (33)	16–42
59	January 29	@ San Francisco	100–106	Dick Garrett (27)	16–43
60	January 31	@ Cleveland	108–117	Em Bryant (19)	16–44
61	February 2	N Cleveland	101–91	Don May (34)	16–45
62	February 5	Baltimore	98–90	Dick Garrett (25)	16–46
63	February 10	New York	99–106	Don May (29)	17–46
64	February 13	@ Cleveland	111–106	Don May (35)	18–46
65	February 14	Phoenix	108–97	Don May (32)	18–47
66	February 16	Milwaukee	135–103	Don May (34)	18–48
67	February 17	@ Baltimore	118–114	Bob Kauffman (24)	19–48
68	February 19	Baltimore	120–113	Bob Kauffman (22)	19–49
69	February 20	@ Cincinnati	94–120	Bob Kauffman (24)	19–50
70	February 22	San Francisco	109–91	Don May (36)	19–51
71	February 26	Detroit	127–122 (OT)	Bob Kauffman (29)	19–52
72	February 27	@ Atlanta	117–134	Bryant, Kauffman (21)	19–53
73	March 2	Los Angeles	131–118	Don May (40)	19–54
74	March 4	@ Milwaukee	113–116	Bob Kauffman (26)	19–55
75	March 6	Cleveland	109–120	Don May (25)	20–55
76	March 8	@ Portland	114–98	Don May (31)	21–55
77	March 9	@ San Diego	96–106	Don May (31)	21–56
78	March 12	@ Los Angeles	116–109	Don May (23)	22–56
79	March 14	@ Portland	112–122	Dick Garrett (24)	22–57
80	March 16	Cincinnati	113–102	Don May (21)	22–58
81	March 19	@ Detroit	105–111	Kauffman, May (18)	22–59
82	March 20	Portland	132–129 (OT)	Don May (36)	22–60

== Playoffs ==
The Braves missed the playoffs for the first inaugural season.

== Player statistics ==
Note: GP= Games played; MPG = Minutes per game; FG% = Field goal percentage; FT% = Free throw percentage; RPG = Rebounds per game; APG = Assists per game; PPG = Points per game

Player	GP	MPG	FG%	FT%	RPG	APG	PPG
Bob Kauffman	78	35.6	.471	.740	10.7	4.5	20.4
Don May	76	35.1	.471	.791	7.5	2.0	20.2
John Hummer	81	32.6	.444	.580	8.9	2.0	11.3
Dick Garrett	75	31.7	.414	.869	3.9	3.5	12.9
Em Bryant	73	29.3	.421	.744	3.6	4.8	10.0
Herm Gilliam	80	26.0	.422	.751	4.2	3.6	11.2
Mike Davis	73	22.2	.410	.760	2.6	2.1	11.4
Cornell Warner	65	19.9	.415	.552	7.0	0.8	6.0
Bill Hosket	13	16.7	.522	.647	5.8	1.5	8.1
George Wilson	46	15.5	.342	.812	5.0	1.0	5.2
Freddie Crawford	15	13.5	.340	.615	2.3	1.6	5.9
Nate Bowman	44	11.0	.392	.526	3.9	0.9	3.1
Mike Silliman	36	10.2	.456	.487	1.7	0.6	2.5
Paul Long	30	7.1	.475	.487	1.0	0.8	4.5
Mike Lynn	5	5.0	.286	1.000	0.8	0.2	1.4

== Awards and honors ==
- Bob Kauffman, NBA All-Star

== Transactions ==
The Braves were involved in the following transactions during the 1970–71 season.

=== Trades ===
March 23, 1970
To Buffalo Braves

- Mike Davis
- 15th pick in the 1970 NBA Draft.
To Baltimore Bullets

- 9th pick in the 1970 NBA Draft.
May 11, 1970
To Buffalo Braves

- Bob Kauffman
- 1971 2nd round draft pick
To Philadelphia 76ers

- Bailey Howell
June 20, 1970
To Buffalo Braves

- Nate Bowman
- Draft rights to Mike Silliman
To New York Knicks

- Cash considerations
November 26, 1970
To Buffalo Braves

- Future draft pick
To Philadelphia 76ers

- Freddie Crawford

=== Free agents ===
==== Additions ====
Player	Signed	Former team
George Wilson	August 11	Philadelphia 76ers

==== Subtractions ====
Player	Left	New team
Ray Scott	free agency, July 1	Virginia Squires
