= 1970–71 Cleveland Cavaliers season =

NBA basketball team season (inaugural season)

- Head coach: Bill Fitch
- Arena: Cleveland Arena

Results
- Record: 15–67 (.183)
- Place: Division: 4th (Central); Conference: 8th (Eastern)
- Playoff finish: Did not qualify
- Stats at Basketball Reference

Local media
- Television: WEWS-TV
- Radio: WERE

The 1970–71 Cleveland Cavaliers season was the inaugural season of NBA basketball in Cleveland, Ohio. The Cavaliers finished the season with a 15–67 record in their first season, finishing last in the Central Division and Eastern Conference. John Johnson was named an All-Star, the first in franchise history.

Key Dates:

== Offseason ==
=== Expansion draft ===
- As an expansion (first year) franchise, the Cavaliers chose 11 players from other NBA teams in the 'expansion draft.'

Player	Position	Team
Butch Beard	Guard	Atlanta Hawks
Len Chappell	Center	Milwaukee Bucks
Johnny Egan	Guard	L.A. Lakers
Bobby Lewis	Guard	San Francisco Warriors
McCoy McLemore	Center	Detroit Pistons
Don Ohl	Guard	Atlanta Hawks
Walt Wesley	Center	Chicago Bulls
Loy Petersen	Guard	Chicago Bulls
Luther Rackley	Center	Cincinnati Royals
Bingo Smith	Guard	San Diego Rockets
John Warren	Guard	New York Knickerbockers

== Draft picks ==
Round	Pick	Player	Position	Nationality	School/Club team
1	7	John Johnson	Forward	United States	Iowa
2	26	Dave Sorenson	Forward	United States	Ohio State
3	41	Surry Oliver	Guard	United States	Stephen F. Austin
4	60	Glen Vidnovic	Forward	United States	Iowa
5	75	Wayne Sokolowski	Forward	United States	Ashland
6	94	Joe Cooke	Guard	United States	Indiana
7	109	Narvis Anderson	Forward	United States	Stephen F. Austin
8	128	Walt Robertson	Forward	United States	Loyola University Chicago
9	143	Tom Lagodich	Guard	United States	Kent State
10	162	Ken Johnson	Forward	United States	Indiana

== Roster ==
1970–71 Cleveland Cavaliers roster
Players

Pos.	No.	Player	Height	Weight	DOB	From
SG	10	Joe Cooke	6 ft 3 in (1.91 m)	175 lb (79 kg)	Aug. 14, 1948	Indiana
PF	23	Gary Freeman	6 ft 9 in (2.06 m)	210 lb (95 kg)	Jul. 25, 1948	Oregon State
SF	32	John Johnson	6 ft 7 in (2.01 m)	200 lb (91 kg)	Oct. 18, 1947	Iowa
SG	5	Bobby Lewis	6 ft 3 in (1.91 m)	175 lb (79 kg)	Mar. 20, 1945	North Carolina
PF	30	Larry Mikan	6 ft 7 in (2.01 m)	210 lb (95 kg)	Apr. 8, 1948	Minnesota
C	45	Luther Rackley	6 ft 10 in (2.08 m)	220 lb (100 kg)	Jun. 11, 1946	Xavier
PF	15	Dave Sorenson	6 ft 8 in (2.03 m)	225 lb (102 kg)	Jul. 8, 1948	Ohio State
G/F	7	Bingo Smith	6 ft 5 in (1.96 m)	195 lb (88 kg)	Feb. 26, 1946	Tulsa
C	40	Gary Suiter	6 ft 9 in (2.06 m)	225 lb (102 kg)	Jan. 18, 1945	Midwestern State
SG	11	John Warren	6 ft 3 in (1.91 m)	180 lb (82 kg)	Jul. 7, 1947	St. John's
PG	17	Bobby Washington	5 ft 11 in (1.80 m)	175 lb (79 kg)	Jul. 11, 1947	Eastern Kentucky
C	44	Walt Wesley	6 ft 11 in (2.11 m)	220 lb (100 kg)	Jan. 25, 1945	Kansas

Coaches
Head coach
- Bill Fitch
Assistant(s)
- Jim Lessig

Legend
- (DP) Unsigned draft pick
- (FA) Free agent
- (S) Suspended
- Injured

== Regular season ==
=== Season standings ===
Central Division	W	L	PCT	GB	Home	Road	Neutral	Div
y-Baltimore Bullets	42	40	.512	–	24–13	16–25	2–2	10–6
x-Atlanta Hawks	36	46	.439	6	21–20	14–26	1–0	9–7
Cincinnati Royals	33	49	.402	9	17–16	11–28	5–5	16–6
Cleveland Cavaliers	15	67	.183	27	11–30	2–37	2–0	1–13

#	Eastern Conference			
#	Team	W	L	PCT
1	z-New York Knicks	52	30	.634
2	y-Baltimore Bullets	42	40	.512
3	x-Philadelphia 76ers	47	35	.573
4	x-Atlanta Hawks	36	46	.439
5	Boston Celtics	44	38	.537
6	Cincinnati Royals	33	49	.402
7	Buffalo Braves	22	60	.268
8	Cleveland Cavaliers	15	67	.183

== Game log ==
=== October ===
Record: 0–9; Home: 0–2; Road: 0–7

#	Date	H/A/N	Opponent	W/L	Score	Record	
1	October 14	A	Buffalo Braves	L	92–107	0–1	
2	October 16	A	Portland Trail Blazers	L	112–115	0–2	
3	October 17	A	San Francisco Warriors	L	108–128	0–3	at Oakland, California
4	October 20	A	Portland Trail Blazers	L	98–120	0–4	
5	October 22	A	San Diego Rockets	L	110–140	0–5	
6	October 23	A	Phoenix Suns	L	104–108	0–6	
7	October 25	A	Los Angeles Lakers	L	96–123	0–7	
8	October 28	H	San Diego Rockets	L	99–110	0–8	
9	October 30	H	Cincinnati Royals	L	110–125	0–9	

=== November ===
Record: 1–17; Home: 0–8; Road: 1–9

#	Date	H/A/N	Opponent	W/L	Score	Record
10	November 1	H	Atlanta Hawks	L	107–130	0–10
11	November 2	A	Philadelphia 76ers	L	87–141	0–11
12	November 4	H	Milwaukee Bucks	L	108–110	0–12
13	November 7	A	Buffalo Braves	L	91–103	0–13
14	November 8	H	Seattle SuperSonics	L	105–111	0–14
15	November 10	A	San Francisco Warriors	L	74–109	0–15
16	November 12	A	Portland Trail Blazers	W	105–103	1–15
17	November 13	A	Seattle SuperSonics	L	91–111	1–16
18	November 14	A	Portland Trail Blazers	L	110–125	1–17
19	November 16	A	Baltimore Bullets	L	86–98	1–18
20	November 18	H	Baltimore Bullets	L	98–111	1–19
21	November 20	A	Boston Celtics	L	112–116	1–20
22	November 21	A	New York Knicks	L	94–102	1–21
23	November 22	H	Phoenix Suns	L	99–114	1–22
24	November 25	H	San Francisco Warriors	L	99–108	1–23
25	November 27	H	Portland Trail Blazers	L	102–111	1–24
26	November 28	A	Cincinnati Royals	L	86–105	1–25
27	November 29	H	Detroit Pistons	L	99–120	1–26

=== December ===
Record: 4–13; Home: 4–6; Road: 0–7

#	Date	H/A/N	Opponent	W/L	Score	Record
28	December 4	H	Boston Celtics	L	107–118	1–27
29	December 6	H	Buffalo Braves	W	108–106	2–27
30	December 9	H	Portland Trail Blazers	L	102–109	2–28
31	December 11	A	Milwaukee Bucks	L	92–134	2–29
32	December 12	A	Cincinnati Royals	L	95–114	2–30
33	December 13	H	San Diego Rockets	L	95–118	2–31
34	December 15	A	New York Knicks	L	92–110	2–32
35	December 16	H	New York Knicks	L	84–108	2–33
36	December 18	A	Buffalo Braves	L	94–113	2–34
37	December 19	H	Buffalo Braves	W	123–112	3–34
38	December 20	H	Chicago Bulls	L	103–116	3–35
39	December 22	A	Chicago Bulls	L	80–121	3–36
40	December 25	A	Cincinnati Royals	L	100–117	3–37
41	December 26	H	Buffalo Braves	W	120–107	4–37
42	December 27	H	Philadelphia 76ers	W	114–101	5–37
43	December 29	H	Milwaukee Bucks	L	97–119	5–38
44	December 31	A	Atlanta Hawks	L	85–119	5–39

=== January ===
Record: 5–9; Home: 4–4; Road: 0–5; Neutral: 1–0:

#	Date	H/A/N	Opponent	W/L	Score	Record	
45	January 1	H	Baltimore Bullets	L	105–128	5–40	
46	January 2	A	Milwaukee Bucks	L	73–118	5–41	
47	January 4	H	Portland Trail Blazers	L	106–119	5–42	
48	January 6	H	New York Knicks	L	94–127	5–43	
49	January 7	H	Los Angeles Lakers	L	105–110	5–44	
50	January 9	H	Buffalo Braves	W	111–89	6–44	
51	January 14	A	Detroit Pistons	L	106–108	6–45	
52	January 16	A	Philadelphia 76ers	L	96–115	6–46	
53	January 19	N	Buffalo Braves	W	111–79	7–46	at Syracuse, New York
54	January 24	A	Boston Celtics	L	110–121	7–47	
55	January 25	H	Boston Celtics	W	117–116	8–47	
56	January 27	H	Portland Trail Blazers	W	118–104	9–47	
57	January 29	A	Atlanta Hawks	L	111–119	9–48	
58	January 31	H	Buffalo Braves	W	117–108	10–48	

=== February ===
Record: 2–12; Home: 1–5; Road: 0–7; Neutral: 1–0

#	Date	H/A/N	Opponent	W/L	Score	Record	
59	February 2	N	Buffalo Braves	W	101–91	11–48	at Rochester, New York
60	February 3	H	Seattle SuperSonics	L	95–98	11–49	
61	February 5	A	San Diego Rockets	L	105–116	11–50	
62	February 6	A	Phoenix Suns	L	91–119	11–51	
63	February 7	A	Portland Trail Blazers	L	103–112	11–52	
64	February 9	H	Los Angeles Lakers	L	111–116	11–53	
65	February 12	H	Phoenix Suns	L	105–114	11–54	
66	February 13	H	Buffalo Braves	L	106–111	11–55	
67	February 14	A	Chicago Bulls	L	83–108	11–56	
68	February 17	H	Chicago Bulls	L	104–109	11–57	
69	February 19	H	Cincinnati Royals	W	125–109	12–57	
70	February 21	A	Portland Trail Blazers	L	105–123	12–58	
71	February 24	A	Seattle SuperSonics	L	101–123	12–59	
72	February 28	A	Los Angeles Lakers	L	90–107	12–60	

=== March ===
Record: 3–7; Home: 2–5; Road: 1–2

#	Date	H/A/N	Opponent	W/L	Score	Record
73	March 6	A	Buffalo Braves	L	109–120	12–61
74	March 7	A	Detroit Pistons	W	104–100	13–61
75	March 9	H	Philadelphia 76ers	L	113–124	13–62
76	March 12	H	Atlanta Hawks	L	107–119	13–63
77	March 14	H	Cincinnati Royals	L	103–115	13–64
78	March 16	H	San Francisco Warriors	W	108–103	14–64
79	March 17	A	Baltimore Bullets	L	109–113	14–65
80	March 20	H	Detroit Pistons	W	114–103	15–65
81	March 21	H	Portland Trail Blazers	L	110–113	15–66
82	March 23	H	Portland Trail Blazers	L	112–114	15–67

1970–71 game log
Total: 15–67 (Home: 11–30; Road: 2–37, Neutral: 2–0)
October: 0–9 (home: 0–2; road: 0–7)

Game	Date	Team	Score	High points	High rebounds	High assists	Location Attendance	Record

November: 1–17 (home: 0–8; road: 1–9)

Game	Date	Team	Score	High points	High rebounds	High assists	Location Attendance	Record
10	November 1, 1970	Atlanta	L 107–131				Cleveland Arena; 3,533	0–10

December: 4–13 (home: 4–6; road: 0–7)

Game	Date	Team	Score	High points	High rebounds	High assists	Location Attendance	Record
44	December 31, 1970	@ Atlanta	L 85–119				Alexander Memorial Coliseum; 5,429	5–39

January: 5–9 (home: 4–4; road: 1–5)

Game	Date	Team	Score	High points	High rebounds	High assists	Location Attendance	Record
57	January 29, 1971	@ Atlanta	L 111–119				Alexander Memorial Coliseum; 7,192	9–48

February: 2–12 (home: 1–5; road: 1–7)

Game	Date	Team	Score	High points	High rebounds	High assists	Location Attendance	Record

March: 3–7 (home: 2–5; road: 1–2)

Game	Date	Team	Score	High points	High rebounds	High assists	Location Attendance	Record
76	March 12, 1971	Atlanta	L 107–119				Cleveland Arena; 8,341	13–63

1970–71 schedule
