= Gary Zeller =

American basketball player (1947–1996)

Personal information
- Born: November 20, 1947 Topeka, Kansas, U.S.
- Died: February 5, 1996 (aged 48)
- Listed height: 6 ft 3 in (1.91 m)
- Listed weight: 205 lb (93 kg)

Career information
- High school: Lamar (Houston, Texas)
- College: Long Beach CC (1966–1968); Drake (1968–1970)
- NBA draft: 1970: 15th round, 83rd overall pick
- Drafted by: Baltimore Bullets
- Position: Shooting guard
- Number: 18

Career history
- 1970–1972: Baltimore Bullets
- 1972: New York Nets
- Stats at NBA.com
- Stats at Basketball Reference

Gary Lynn Zeller (November 20, 1947 – February 5, 1996) was an American professional basketball player. He played college basketball for the Drake Bulldogs and played in the National Basketball Association for the Baltimore Bullets for parts of two seasons. He then played for the New York Nets during the 1971–72 season. In 90 career games, he averaged 8.7 minutes and 3.2 points per game.

== Career statistics ==
Legend
GP	Games played	GS	Games started	MPG	Minutes per game
FG%	Field goal percentage	3P%	3-point field goal percentage	FT%	Free throw percentage
RPG	Rebounds per game	APG	Assists per game	SPG	Steals per game
BPG	Blocks per game	PPG	Points per game	**Bold**	Career high

=== NBA/ABA ===
==== Regular season ====
Year	Team	GP	MPG	FG%	3P%	FT%	RPG	APG	PPG
1970–71	Baltimore (NBA)	**50**	4.5	.296		.536	.5	.1	1.7
1971–72	Baltimore (NBA)	28	**16.8**	**.362**		.629	**2.3**	**1.1**	**6.7**
1971–72	N.Y. Nets (ABA)	12	6.8	.233	.000	**.667**	.8	.2	1.5
Career (NBA)		78	8.9	.340		.587	1.2	.5	3.5
Career (overall)		90	8.7	.332	.000	.594	1.1	.4	3.2

==== Playoffs ====
Year	Team	GP	MPG	FG%	3P%	FT%	RPG	APG	PPG
1971	Baltimore (NBA)	**15**	**4.5**	.343		**.286**	**.9**	**.3**	**1.7**
1972	N.Y. Nets (ABA)	3	3.0	**1.000**	–	.000	.3	.0	.7
Career (overall)		18	4.2	.361	–	.250	.8	.2	1.6
