= 1970–71 Boston Celtics season =

NBA basketball team season

- Head coach: Tom Heinsohn
- General manager: Red Auerbach
- Arena: Boston Garden

Results
- Record: 44–38 (.537)
- Place: Division: 3rd (Atlantic); Conference: 5th (Eastern)
- Playoff finish: Did not qualify
- Stats at Basketball Reference

The 1970–71 Boston Celtics season was the Celtics' 25th season in the NBA. They missed the playoffs for the second straight season.

== Draft picks ==
Round	Pick	Player	Position	Nationality	College
1	4	Dave Cowens	C/PF	United States	Florida State
2	21	Rex Morgan	PG/SG	United States	Jacksonville
3	38	Willie Williams	F	United States	Florida State
4	55	Jon McKinney	F	United States	Norfolk State
5	72	Tom Carter	F	United States	Paul Quinn
6	89	Rod McIntyre	F	United States	Jacksonville
7	106	Charlie Scott	PG/SG	United States	North Carolina
8	123	Bobby Croft	C	Canada	Tennessee
9	140	Tom Little	G	United States	Seattle
10	157	Mike Maloy	PF	United States	Davidson

== Roster ==
Boston Celtics roster
Players

Pos.	No.	Player	Height	Weight	DOB	From
SG	12	Don Chaney	6 ft 5 in (1.96 m)	210 lb (95 kg)		Houston
F/C	18	Dave Cowens	6 ft 9 in (2.06 m)	230 lb (104 kg)		Florida State
C	29	Henry Finkel	7 ft 0 in (2.13 m)	240 lb (109 kg)		Dayton
G/F	17	John Havlicek	6 ft 5 in (1.96 m)	203 lb (92 kg)		Ohio State
F/C	11	Steve Kuberski	6 ft 8 in (2.03 m)	215 lb (98 kg)		Bradley
G	20	Rex Morgan	6 ft 5 in (1.96 m)	190 lb (86 kg)		Jacksonville
F	19	Don Nelson	6 ft 6 in (1.98 m)	210 lb (95 kg)		Iowa
SF	16	Satch Sanders	6 ft 6 in (1.98 m)	210 lb (95 kg)		NYU
C	33	Garfield Smith	6 ft 9 in (2.06 m)	235 lb (107 kg)		Eastern Kentucky
G	10	Jo Jo White	6 ft 3 in (1.91 m)	190 lb (86 kg)		Kansas
G	7	Art Williams	6 ft 1 in (1.85 m)	180 lb (82 kg)		Cal Poly Pomona

Coaches
Head coach
- Tom Heinsohn

Legend
- (DP) Unsigned draft pick
- (FA) Free agent
- (S) Suspended
- Injured

== Regular season ==
Atlantic Division	W	L	PCT	GB	Home	Road	Neutral	Div
y-New York Knicks	52	30	.634	–	32–9	19–20	1–1	10–6
x-Philadelphia 76ers	47	35	.573	5	24–15	21–18	2–2	10–6
Boston Celtics	44	38	.537	8	25–14	18–22	1–2	8–8
Buffalo Braves	22	60	.268	30	14–23	6–30	2–7	2–10

#	Eastern Conference			
#	Team	W	L	PCT
1	z-New York Knicks	52	30	.634
2	y-Baltimore Bullets	42	40	.512
3	x-Philadelphia 76ers	47	35	.573
4	x-Atlanta Hawks	36	46	.439
5	Boston Celtics	44	38	.537
6	Cincinnati Royals	33	49	.402
7	Buffalo Braves	22	60	.268
8	Cleveland Cavaliers	15	67	.183

z = clinched division title
y = clinched division title
x = clinched playoff spot

=== Game log ===
1970–71 game log
#	Date	Opponent	Score	High points	Record
1	October 13	@ New York	107–114	John Havlicek (31)	0–1
2	October 15	@ Phoenix	100–119	Dave Cowens (27)	0–2
3	October 17	@ Seattle	114–126	John Havlicek (23)	0–3
4	October 18	@ Portland	133–115	John Havlicek (38)	1–3
5	October 21	Detroit	121–118	John Havlicek (33)	1–4
6	October 23	Cincinnati	126–131	John Havlicek (32)	2–4
7	October 24	@ Atlanta	113–109	Jo Jo White (29)	3–4
8	October 28	New York	126–89	Jo Jo White (19)	3–5
9	October 30	Phoenix	112–127	John Havlicek (33)	4–5
10	October 31	@ Philadelphia	133–102	John Havlicek (33)	5–5
11	November 4	Philadelphia	113–115	John Havlicek (37)	6–5
12	November 6	Seattle	94–116	John Havlicek (30)	7–5
13	November 7	@ Cincinnati	140–122	John Havlicek (37)	8–5
14	November 11	Milwaukee	123–113	John Havlicek (31)	8–6
15	November 13	Atlanta	116–114	Dave Cowens (29)	8–7
16	November 14	@ Baltimore	101–122	Jo Jo White (21)	8–8
17	November 18	San Francisco	90–89	John Havlicek (30)	8–9
18	November 20	Cleveland	112–116	Dave Cowens (29)	9–9
19	November 21	@ Chicago	107–110	John Havlicek (28)	9–10
20	November 25	Portland	115–122	John Havlicek (32)	10–10
21	November 27	Baltimore	107–153	John Havlicek (33)	11–10
22	November 28	@ Detroit	121–98	Jo Jo White (27)	12–10
23	November 30	N Buffalo	106–109	John Havlicek (38)	13–10
24	December 1	@ Buffalo	117–116 (OT)	Jo Jo White (37)	14–10
25	December 2	Los Angeles	111–114	John Havlicek (26)	15–10
26	December 4	@ Cleveland	118–107	John Havlicek (39)	16–10
27	December 5	@ Chicago	101–97	John Havlicek (38)	17–10
28	December 8	@ Buffalo	122–102	John Havlicek (34)	18–10
29	December 9	Seattle	121–136	John Havlicek (29)	19–10
30	December 11	Detroit	121–118 (OT)	John Havlicek (32)	19–11
31	December 17	Buffalo	93–102	Jo Jo White (35)	20–11
32	December 18	@ Milwaukee	114–124	John Havlicek (25)	20–12
33	December 19	@ Baltimore	128–134	John Havlicek (34)	20–13
34	December 22	@ San Francisco	138–108	Jo Jo White (35)	21–13
35	December 25	@ Los Angeles	113–123	John Havlicek (25)	21–14
36	December 26	@ Seattle	117–124	John Havlicek (32)	21–15
37	December 27	@ Portland	123–135	Havlicek, Nelson (29)	21–16
38	December 29	@ San Diego	110–108	John Havlicek (22)	22–16
39	December 31	San Francisco	144–106	Jo Jo White (25)	22–17
40	January 2	@ Philadelphia	125–120	Dave Cowens (29)	23–17
41	January 3	@ Atlanta	140–128	Don Chaney (31)	24–17
42	January 5	N Portland	124–120	Jo Jo White (24)	24–18
43	January 6	Seattle	112–137	John Havlicek (32)	25–18
44	January 8	Phoenix	114–122	John Havlicek (39)	26–18
45	January 10	Philadelphia	115–107	John Havlicek (34)	26–19
46	January 15	Atlanta	123–134	John Havlicek (27)	27–19
47	January 16	@ Detroit	118–121	John Havlicek (29)	27–20
48	January 17	@ Milwaukee	113–120	Don Nelson (26)	27–21
49	January 20	San Diego	112–142	John Havlicek (31)	28–21
50	January 22	Baltimore	136–117	Jo Jo White (26)	28–22
51	January 23	@ New York	107–128	Jo Jo White (31)	28–23
52	January 24	Cleveland	110–121	John Havlicek (36)	29–23
53	January 25	@ Cleveland	116–117	John Havlicek (29)	29–24
54	January 27	Milwaukee	132–129	Jo Jo White (30)	29–25
55	January 29	New York	118–111	John Havlicek (27)	29–26
56	January 31	Philadelphia	126–132	John Havlicek (31)	30–26
57	February 2	@ Philadelphia	105–108	Dave Cowens (22)	30–27
58	February 3	@ Cincinnati	115–134	John Havlicek (28)	30–28
59	February 5	Cincinnati	110–114	Havlicek, White (26)	31–28
60	February 7	Chicago	96–104	John Havlicek (32)	32–28
61	February 9	@ Chicago	90–88	John Havlicek (33)	33–28
62	February 10	@ Atlanta	102–114	John Havlicek (23)	33–29
63	February 12	@ Baltimore	113–109 (OT)	John Havlicek (36)	34–29
64	February 14	@ Detroit	110–108	John Havlicek (36)	35–29
65	February 16	Phoenix	119–116	John Havlicek (39)	35–30
66	February 17	@ San Francisco	129–99	John Havlicek (28)	36–30
67	February 19	@ Phoenix	112–116	Jo Jo White (33)	36–31
68	February 20	@ San Diego	118–128	John Havlicek (37)	36–32
69	February 21	@ Los Angeles	116–124	John Havlicek (32)	36–33
70	February 24	Los Angeles	96–116	John Havlicek (28)	37–33
71	February 26	Atlanta	129–136 (OT)	Jo Jo White (38)	38–33
72	February 28	Milwaukee	111–99	Dave Cowens (36)	38–34
73	March 3	San Diego	113–128	Jo Jo White (34)	39–34
74	March 6	@ New York	104–112	Chaney, Havlicek (27)	39–35
75	March 7	New York	116–110	John Havlicek (37)	39–36
76	March 9	@ San Francisco	134–112	John Havlicek (37)	40–36
77	March 11	@ San Diego	91–115	Jo Jo White (17)	40–37
78	March 12	N Cincinnati	124–108	John Havlicek (30)	40–38
79	March 14	Chicago	104–117	Don Nelson (36)	41–38
80	March 17	Los Angeles	104–112	John Havlicek (27)	42–38
81	March 19	Baltimore	117–125	John Havlicek (28)	43–38
82	March 21	Cincinnati	110–135	Jo Jo White (28)	44–38

== Awards and records ==
- Dave Cowens, NBA Rookie of the Year Award
- John Havlicek, All-NBA First Team
- John Havlicek, NBA All-Defensive Second Team
- Dave Cowens, NBA All-Rookie Team 1st Team
