= 1970–71 Philadelphia 76ers season =

Season of National Basketball Association team the Philadelphia 76ers

- Head coach: Jack Ramsay
- Arena: The Spectrum

Results
- Record: 47–35 (.573)
- Place: Division: 2nd (Atlantic); Conference: 3rd (Eastern)
- Playoff finish: East Conference Semifinals (eliminated 3–4)
- Stats at Basketball Reference

Local media
- Television: WTAF-TV
- Radio: WCAU

The 1970–71 Philadelphia 76ers season was the 76ers 22nd season in the NBA and 8th season in Philadelphia. They improved to a record of 47–35. In the playoffs, they lost a hard-fought series with the Baltimore Bullets 4–3, who represented the Eastern Conference in the Finals. This was the final season for forward Bailey Howell, who was signed by Philadelphia & was a vital part in 2 Celtics championships in 1968 and 1969.

The Sixers also tried a new uniform style. Instead of the traditional PHILA in block lettering, they used a design that wrote out Seventy Sixers in cursive writing. These uniforms did not last the entire year.

== Offseason ==
=== Draft picks ===
This table only displays picks through the second round.

Round	Pick	Player	Position	Nationality	College
1	12	Al Henry	C	United States	Wisconsin

== Roster ==
Philadelphia 76ers roster
Players

Pos.	No.	Player	Height	Weight	DOB	From
C	20	Dennis Awtrey	6 ft 10 in (2.08 m)	235 lb (107 kg)		Santa Clara
G	21	Archie Clark	6 ft 2 in (1.88 m)	175 lb (79 kg)		Minnesota
SG	11	Freddie Crawford	6 ft 4 in (1.93 m)	189 lb (86 kg)		St. Bonaventure
F	32	Billy Cunningham	6 ft 6 in (1.98 m)	210 lb (95 kg)		North Carolina
C	24	Connie Dierking	6 ft 9 in (2.06 m)	222 lb (101 kg)		Cincinnati
G	15	Hal Greer	6 ft 2 in (1.88 m)	175 lb (79 kg)		Marshall
C	26	Al Henry	6 ft 9 in (2.06 m)	190 lb (86 kg)		Wisconsin
SF	16	Bailey Howell	6 ft 7 in (2.01 m)	210 lb (95 kg)		Mississippi State
F	54	Luke Jackson	6 ft 9 in (2.06 m)	240 lb (109 kg)		Texas–Pan American
G	24	Wali Jones	6 ft 2 in (1.88 m)	180 lb (82 kg)		Villanova
F	12	Jim Washington	6 ft 6 in (1.98 m)	210 lb (95 kg)		Villanova

Coaches
Head coach
- Jack Ramsay

Legend
- (DP) Unsigned draft pick
- (FA) Free agent
- (S) Suspended
- Injured

== Regular season ==
=== Season standings ===
Atlantic Division	W	L	PCT	GB	Home	Road	Neutral	Div
y-New York Knicks	52	30	.634	–	32–9	19–20	1–1	10–6
x-Philadelphia 76ers	47	35	.573	5	24–15	21–18	2–2	10–6
Boston Celtics	44	38	.537	8	25–14	18–22	1–2	8–8
Buffalo Braves	22	60	.268	30	14–23	6–30	2–7	2–10

#	Eastern Conference			
#	Team	W	L	PCT
1	z-New York Knicks	52	30	.634
2	y-Baltimore Bullets	42	40	.512
3	x-Philadelphia 76ers	47	35	.573
4	x-Atlanta Hawks	36	46	.439
5	Boston Celtics	44	38	.537
6	Cincinnati Royals	33	49	.402
7	Buffalo Braves	22	60	.268
8	Cleveland Cavaliers	15	67	.183

z – clinched division title
y – clinched division title
x – clinched playoff spot

=== Game log ===
1970–71 Game log
#	Date	Opponent	Score	High points	Record
1	October 14	Chicago	107–110	Billy Cunningham (24)	1–0
2	October 16	San Diego	119–127	Archie Clark (28)	2–0
3	October 17	@ Cincinnati	123–105	Archie Clark (24)	3–0
4	October 20	@ Buffalo	98–89	Hal Greer (20)	4–0
5	October 21	Los Angeles	141–117	Billy Cunningham (22)	4–1
6	October 23	@ Los Angeles	127–122	Billy Cunningham (31)	5–1
7	October 24	@ San Diego	111–116	Billy Cunningham (33)	5–2
8	October 28	@ San Francisco	111–108	Billy Cunningham (27)	6–2
9	October 30	Baltimore	123–110	Archie Clark (24)	6–3
10	October 31	Boston	133–102	Billy Cunningham (19)	6–4
11	November 2	Cleveland	87–141	Archie Clark (21)	7–4
12	November 4	@ Boston	113–115	Billy Cunningham (25)	7–5
13	November 6	Atlanta	112–118	Billy Cunningham (38)	8–5
14	November 7	Seattle	128–134	Bailey Howell (27)	9–5
15	November 10	@ Atlanta	104–109	Hal Greer (25)	9–6
16	November 11	@ Baltimore	119–107	Archie Clark (30)	10–6
17	November 13	Buffalo	111–119	Cunningham, Greer, Howell (20)	11–6
18	November 14	@ New York	94–126	Billy Cunningham (18)	11–7
19	November 17	@ Detroit	113–91	Archie Clark (24)	12–7
20	November 18	New York	106–113	Billy Cunningham (29)	13–7
21	November 20	Detroit	120–112	Hal Greer (31)	13–8
22	November 21	Phoenix	125–119	Billy Cunningham (34)	13–9
23	November 22	@ Atlanta	115–125	Cunningham, Greer (26)	13–10
24	November 24	San Francisco	104–96	Archie Clark (26)	13–11
25	November 25	N Buffalo	99–92	Billy Cunningham (27)	14–11
26	November 27	Cincinnati	113–109	Billy Cunningham (22)	14–12
27	November 30	Baltimore	98–104	Billy Cunningham (19)	15–12
28	December 1	@ Chicago	91–107	Dennis Awtrey (17)	15–13
29	December 4	@ Milwaukee	122–128 (OT)	Billy Cunningham (33)	15–14
30	December 5	@ Cincinnati	131–106	Archie Clark (29)	16–14
31	December 8	Seattle	107–104	Billy Cunningham (27)	16–15
32	December 11	San Francisco	102–101	Clark, Cunningham (18)	16–16
33	December 12	@ New York	101–118	Archie Clark (21)	16–17
34	December 15	San Diego	98–122	Jim Washington (20)	17–17
35	December 17	@ Seattle	125–117	Archie Clark (29)	18–17
36	December 19	@ San Francisco	108–99	Hal Greer (33)	19–17
37	December 20	@ Portland	134–132 (OT)	Cunningham, Greer (31)	20–17
38	December 22	@ Phoenix	133–129 (OT)	Archie Clark (26)	21–17
39	December 25	Detroit	100–105	Hal Greer (28)	22–17
40	December 27	@ Cleveland	101–114	Clark, Cunningham (25)	22–18
41	December 29	@ Buffalo	124–113	Archie Clark (35)	23–18
42	December 30	Milwaukee	107–119	Billy Cunningham (35)	24–18
43	January 2	Boston	125–120	Billy Cunningham (29)	24–19
44	January 5	San Francisco	92–97	Archie Clark (22)	25–19
45	January 8	Los Angeles	123–117	Archie Clark (29)	25–20
46	January 9	Phoenix	112–123	Archie Clark (33)	26–20
47	January 10	@ Boston	115–107	Billy Cunningham (31)	27–20
48	January 14	@ Chicago	103–108	Bailey Howell (22)	27–21
49	January 15	Chicago	96–99	Hal Greer (22)	28–21
50	January 16	Cleveland	96–115	Hal Greer (29)	29–21
51	January 17	@ San Diego	106–105	Bailey Howell (28)	30–21
52	January 19	@ Los Angeles	114–134	Archie Clark (38)	30–22
53	January 22	@ Phoenix	117–116	Billy Cunningham (31)	31–22
54	January 24	@ Seattle	145–119	Billy Cunningham (33)	32–22
55	January 26	Atlanta	122–129	Hal Greer (36)	33–22
56	January 29	Milwaukee	142–118	Clark, Greer (21)	33–23
57	January 30	@ New York	106–105	Jim Washington (24)	34–23
58	January 31	@ Boston	126–132	Archie Clark (32)	34–24
59	February 2	Boston	105–108	Billy Cunningham (31)	35–24
60	February 5	@ Chicago	102–114	Archie Clark (30)	35–25
61	February 6	@ Cincinnati	118–109	Hal Greer (29)	36–25
62	February 7	New York	99–127	Archie Clark (33)	37–25
63	February 12	@ Detroit	109–118	Billy Cunningham (26)	37–26
64	February 14	N Baltimore	103–112	Billy Cunningham (35)	37–27
65	February 17	N Milwaukee	114–119	Billy Cunningham (26)	37–28
66	February 19	@ Los Angeles	118–104	Jim Washington (28)	38–28
67	February 20	@ Portland	118–105	Archie Clark (30)	39–28
68	February 21	@ Seattle	128–135	Billy Cunningham (34)	39–29
69	February 23	Portland	113–119	Billy Cunningham (35)	40–29
70	February 26	Phoenix	108–94	Billy Cunningham (27)	40–30
71	February 28	Cincinnati	121–131	Billy Cunningham (28)	41–30
72	March 1	@ Milwaukee	103–127	Archie Clark (20)	41–31
73	March 2	San Diego	111–103	Billy Cunningham (22)	41–32
74	March 3	N Portland	104–120	Archie Clark (28)	42–32
75	March 5	New York	116–121	Billy Cunningham (34)	43–32
76	March 6	Detroit	115–121	Clark, Greer (28)	44–32
77	March 9	@ Cleveland	124–113	Billy Cunningham (23)	45–32
78	March 14	@ Atlanta	101–108	Archie Clark (29)	45–33
79	March 16	Atlanta	130–125	Clark, Jackson (26)	45–34
80	March 19	Cincinnati	127–147	Archie Clark (24)	46–34
81	March 20	@ Baltimore	112–124	Bailey Howell (28)	46–35
82	March 21	Baltimore	108–120	Hal Greer (23)	47–35

== Playoffs ==
1971 playoff game log
Conference Semifinals: 3–4 (home: 1–2; road: 2–2)

Game	Date	Team	Score	High points	High rebounds	High assists	Location Attendance	Series
1	March 24	@ Baltimore	W 126–112	Hal Greer (30)	Luke Jackson (13)	Archie Clark (7)	Baltimore Civic Center; 6,707	1–0
2	March 26	Baltimore	L 107–119	Archie Clark (26)	Billy Cunningham (11)	Archie Clark (6)	Spectrum; 10,369	1–1
3	March 28	@ Baltimore	L 103–111	Hal Greer (30)	Billy Cunningham (19)	Billy Cunningham (10)	Baltimore Civic Center; 5,589	1–2
4	March 30	Baltimore	L 105–120	Archie Clark (24)	Billy Cunningham (17)	Billy Cunningham (8)	Spectrum; 8,909	1–3
5	April 1	@ Baltimore	W 104–103	Billy Cunningham (32)	Billy Cunningham (20)	Hal Greer (6)	Baltimore Civic Center; 10,998	2–3
6	April 3	Baltimore	W 98–94	Billy Cunningham (33)	Billy Cunningham (16)	Billy Cunningham (5)	Spectrum; 7,059	3–3
7	April 4	@ Baltimore	L 120–128	Archie Clark (37)	Billy Cunningham (19)	Clark, Greer (5)	Baltimore Civic Center; 6,662	3–4

1971 schedule

== Awards and records ==
- Billy Cunningham, All-NBA First Team
