= 1970–71 Cincinnati Royals season =

NBA professional basketball team season

- Head coach: Bob Cousy
- General manager: Joe Axelson
- Owners: Max Jacobs; Jeremy Jacobs
- Arena: Cincinnati Gardens

Results
- Record: 33–49 (.402)
- Place: Division: 3rd (Central); Conference: 6th (Eastern)
- Playoff finish: Did not qualify
- Stats at Basketball Reference

Local media
- Television: WLWT
- Radio: WLW

The 1970–71 Cincinnati Royals season was the 23rd season of the franchise in the National Basketball Association (NBA). After trading Oscar Robertson, the Royals became a quick, young team. Some players included Norm Van Lier, a second-year guard who would lead the league in assists with 10.1 assists per game. Draft picks Sam Lacey and Nate "Tiny" Archibald were new additions to the team. The Royals would continue its fast-breaking, high-scoring ways. During the season, they were held below 100 points only four times all season. The Royals also broke the 130 point mark an astounding 11 times. The team's 116.0 scoring average was good for 3rd place in the NBA. Bob Cousy, the Royals coach was not defensive minded, and opposing teams racked up an average of 119.2 points per game. The Royals finished the season in 3rd place in the newly formed Central Division. The Royals would finish the season with a record of 33 wins, compared to 49 losses.

== Roster ==
1970–71 Cincinnati Royals roster
Players

Pos.	No.	Player	Height	Weight	DOB	From
PG	10	Nate Archibald	6 ft 1 in (1.85 m)	165 lb (75 kg)	1948-09-02	UTEP
SF	30	Bob Arnzen	6 ft 5 in (1.96 m)	205 lb (93 kg)	1947-11-03	Notre Dame
G	19	Moe Barr	6 ft 4 in (1.93 m)	195 lb (88 kg)	1944-06-19	Duquesne
C	24	Tom Black	6 ft 10 in (2.08 m)	220 lb (100 kg)	1941-07-09	South Dakota State
PF	20	Johnny Green	6 ft 5 in (1.96 m)	200 lb (91 kg)	1933-12-08	Michigan State
SF	16	Greg Hyder	6 ft 6 in (1.98 m)	215 lb (98 kg)	1948-06-21	Eastern New Mexico
C	22	Darrall Imhoff (injured)	6 ft 10 in (2.08 m)	220 lb (100 kg)	1938-10-11	California
C	44	Sam Lacey	6 ft 10 in (2.08 m)	235 lb (107 kg)	1948-03-28	New Mexico State
PF	18	Charlie Paulk	6 ft 8 in (2.03 m)	219 lb (99 kg)	1946-06-14	Northeastern State
SG	21	Flynn Robinson	6 ft 1 in (1.85 m)	185 lb (84 kg)	1941-04-28	Wyoming
SF	5	Tom Van Arsdale	6 ft 5 in (1.96 m)	202 lb (92 kg)	1943-02-22	Indiana
SG	23	Norm Van Lier	6 ft 1 in (1.85 m)	173 lb (78 kg)	1947-04-01	Saint Francis (PA)
F	15	Willie Williams	6 ft 7 in (2.01 m)	200 lb (91 kg)	1946-07-28	Florida State

Coaches
Head coach
- (United States) Bob Cousy (Holy Cross)

Legend
- (DP) Unsigned draft pick
- (FA) Free agent
- (S) Suspended
- Injured

== Regular season ==
=== Season standings ===
Central Division	W	L	PCT	GB	Home	Road	Neutral	Div
y-Baltimore Bullets	42	40	.512	–	24–13	16–25	2–2	10–6
x-Atlanta Hawks	36	46	.439	6	21–20	14–26	1–0	9–7
Cincinnati Royals	33	49	.402	9	17–16	11–28	5–5	16–6
Cleveland Cavaliers	15	67	.183	27	11–30	2–37	2–0	1–13

#	Eastern Conference			
#	Team	W	L	PCT
1	z-New York Knicks	52	30	.634
2	y-Baltimore Bullets	42	40	.512
3	x-Philadelphia 76ers	47	35	.573
4	x-Atlanta Hawks	36	46	.439
5	Boston Celtics	44	38	.537
6	Cincinnati Royals	33	49	.402
7	Buffalo Braves	22	60	.268
8	Cleveland Cavaliers	15	67	.183

=== Season schedule ===
1970–71 Game log
#	Date	Opponent	Score	High points	Record
1	October 14	New York	128–104	Tom Van Arsdale (22)	0–1
2	October 17	Philadelphia	123–105	Tom Van Arsdale (29)	0–2
3	October 21	Baltimore	117–105	Norm Van Lier (17)	0–3
4	October 23	@ Boston	126–131	Tom Van Arsdale (26)	0–4
5	October 24	@ New York	103–115	Charlie Paulk (30)	0–5
6	October 26	Atlanta	107–126	Johnny Green (30)	1–5
7	October 28	Seattle	118–131	Norm Van Lier (23)	2–5
8	October 30	@ Cleveland	125–110	Norm Van Lier (23)	3–5
9	October 31	Milwaukee	121–100	Tom Van Arsdale (22)	3–6
10	November 3	@ Detroit	112–115	Flynn Robinson (23)	3–7
11	November 4	Phoenix	133–115	Johnny Green (21)	3–8
12	November 7	Boston	140–122	Johnny Green (28)	3–9
13	November 10	@ Portland	138–121	Tom Van Arsdale (28)	4–9
14	November 11	@ San Diego	120–127	Tom Van Arsdale (34)	4–10
15	November 12	@ San Francisco	121–107	Tom Van Arsdale (29)	5–10
16	November 13	@ Phoenix	109–115	Sam Lacey (20)	5–11
17	November 18	Chicago	128–107	Tom Van Arsdale (24)	5–12
18	November 19	@ New York	106–98	Archibald, Van Arsdale (22)	6–12
19	November 21	Detroit	102–114	Tom Van Arsdale (34)	7–12
20	November 25	San Diego	138–120	Archibald, Van Arsdale (21)	7–13
21	November 27	@ Philadelphia	113–109	Green, Van Arsdale (23)	8–13
22	November 28	Cleveland	86–105	Tom Van Arsdale (20)	9–13
23	December 2	Seattle	119–111	Norm Van Lier (22)	9–14
24	December 5	Philadelphia	131–106	Tom Van Arsdale (29)	9–15
25	December 6	@ Baltimore	118–126	Tom Van Arsdale (29)	9–16
26	December 7	N San Francisco	113–124	Tom Van Arsdale (36)	10–16
27	December 9	Atlanta	106–118	Johnny Green (31)	11–16
28	December 12	Cleveland	95–114	Norm Van Lier (26)	12–16
29	December 16	Los Angeles	118–102	Tom Van Arsdale (26)	12–17
30	December 18	@ Chicago	122–137	Norm Van Lier (31)	12–18
31	December 19	Milwaukee	110–119	Sam Lacey (23)	13–18
32	December 20	N Detroit	136–135 (2OT)	Johnny Green (39)	13–19
33	December 23	Baltimore	115–120	Tom Van Arsdale (37)	14–19
34	December 25	Cleveland	100–117	Van Arsdale, Van Lier (23)	15–19
35	December 26	@ Atlanta	130–118	Norm Van Lier (29)	16–19
36	December 28	N Milwaukee	137–114	Flynn Robinson (22)	16–20
37	December 30	Detroit	119–115	Johnny Green (29)	16–21
38	January 2	@ Buffalo	115–103	Tom Van Arsdale (27)	17–21
39	January 5	N Los Angeles	112–146	Johnny Green (34)	18–21
40	January 6	Portland	128–133 (OT)	Norm Van Lier (28)	19–21
41	January 8	@ Detroit	109–115	Sam Lacey (25)	19–22
42	January 9	Seattle	114–110	Sam Lacey (28)	19–23
43	January 14	N Los Angeles	126–120	Johnny Green (27)	19–24
44	January 15	@ Milwaukee	116–135	Sam Lacey (27)	19–25
45	January 16	Buffalo	113–114	Archibald, Green, Van Arsdale (23)	20–25
46	January 18	N Phoenix	118–99	Tom Van Arsdale (18)	20–26
47	January 19	@ San Francisco	108–116	Tom Van Arsdale (30)	20–27
48	January 20	@ Phoenix	126–114	Norm Van Lier (34)	21–27
49	January 22	@ Seattle	131–132 (OT)	Tom Van Arsdale (39)	21–28
50	January 24	@ Los Angeles	131–142	Tom Van Arsdale (25)	21–29
51	January 27	Baltimore	113–115	Johnny Green (35)	22–29
52	January 29	@ Baltimore	118–145	Van Arsdale, Van Lier (22)	22–30
53	January 30	San Diego	110–116	Norm Van Lier (25)	23–30
54	January 31	@ Chicago	99–131	Flynn Robinson (20)	23–31
55	February 2	@ New York	108–115	Sam Lacey (27)	23–32
56	February 3	Boston	115–134	Tom Van Arsdale (34)	24–32
57	February 5	@ Boston	110–114	Tom Van Arsdale (27)	24–33
58	February 6	Philadelphia	118–109	Flynn Robinson (30)	24–34
59	February 7	@ Atlanta	118–121	Johnny Green (30)	24–35
60	February 11	@ Seattle	101–119	Tom Van Arsdale (22)	24–36
61	February 12	@ San Francisco	119–133	Tom Van Arsdale (40)	24–37
62	February 13	@ San Diego	116–120	Tom Van Arsdale (27)	24–38
63	February 14	@ Los Angeles	113–125	Norm Van Lier (24)	24–39
64	February 16	N Portland	102–109	Tom Van Arsdale (29)	25–39
65	February 17	@ Phoenix	117–133	Charlie Paulk (27)	25–40
66	February 19	@ Cleveland	109–125	Flynn Robinson (32)	25–41
67	February 20	Buffalo	94–120	Flynn Robinson (25)	26–41
68	February 24	New York	125–105	Flynn Robinson (29)	26–42
69	February 26	@ Milwaukee	111–135	Charlie Paulk (24)	26–43
70	February 28	@ Philadelphia	121–131	Tom Van Arsdale (24)	26–44
71	March 1	N Chicago	94–98	Tom Van Arsdale (22)	26–45
72	March 3	@ Baltimore	133–132 (OT)	Lacey, Van Arsdale (23)	27–45
73	March 5	N Portland	111–117	Tom Van Arsdale (30)	28–45
74	March 7	@ Atlanta	112–122	Nate Archibald (26)	28–46
75	March 10	New York	118–120 (OT)	Tom Van Arsdale (31)	29–46
76	March 12	N Boston	124–108	Tom Van Arsdale (31)	30–46
77	March 13	Atlanta	127–136	Nate Archibald (47)	31–46
78	March 14	@ Cleveland	115–103	Tom Van Arsdale (31)	32–46
79	March 16	@ Buffalo	113–102	Nate Archibald (25)	33–46
80	March 17	San Francisco	110–92	Sam Lacey (20)	33–47
81	March 19	@ Philadelphia	127–147	Johnny Green (18)	33–48
82	March 21	@ Boston	110–135	Tom Van Arsdale (22)	33–49

== Playoffs ==
The Royals missed the playoffs for the fourth straight year.

== Awards and honors ==
- Norm Van Lier, NBA All-Defensive Second Team
