= 1970–71 New York Knicks season =

Season of National Basketball Association team the New York Knicks

- Division champions
- Head coach: Red Holzman
- General manager: Red Holzman
- Arena: Madison Square Garden

Results
- Record: 52–30 (.634)
- Place: Division: 1st (Atlantic); Conference: 1st (Eastern)
- Playoff finish: East Conference finals (lost to Bullets 3–4)
- Stats at Basketball Reference

Local media
- Television: WOR-TV; Manhattan Cable Television
- Radio: WNBC

The 1970–71 New York Knicks season was the 25th season for the team in the National Basketball Association (NBA). New York entered the season as the defending NBA champions, having defeated the Los Angeles Lakers in the 1970 NBA Finals in seven games to win the first championship in franchise history. In the 1970–71 regular season, the Knicks finished in first place in the Atlantic Division with a 52–30 record, and qualified for the NBA playoffs for the fifth consecutive year.

New York began its NBA title defense with a 4–1 series victory over the Atlanta Hawks in the first round of the 1971 NBA Playoffs. In the Eastern Conference Finals, the Baltimore Bullets defeated the Knicks in seven games, ending the team's chances for a repeat championship.

== Draft picks ==
Note: This is not an extensive list; it only covers the first and second rounds, and any other players picked by the franchise that played at least one game in the league.

Round	Pick	Player	Position	Nationality	School/Club team
1	17	Mike Price	G	United States	Illinois
2	34	Howie Wright	G	United States	Austin Peay
8	136	Greg Fillmore	C	United States	Cheyney State)

== Roster ==
1970–71 New York Knicks roster
Players

Pos.	No.	Player	Height	Weight	DOB	From
SG	12	Dick Barnett	6 ft 4 in (1.93 m)	190 lb (86 kg)	1936-10-02	Tennessee State
SF	24	Bill Bradley	6 ft 5 in (1.96 m)	205 lb (93 kg)	1943-07-28	Princeton
PF	22	Dave DeBusschere	6 ft 6 in (1.98 m)	220 lb (100 kg)	1940-10-16	Detroit Mercy
C	34	Greg Fillmore	7 ft 1 in (2.16 m)	240 lb (109 kg)	1947-03-07	Cheyney
PG	10	Walt Frazier	6 ft 4 in (1.93 m)	200 lb (91 kg)	1945-03-29	Southern Illinois
PF	18	Phil Jackson	6 ft 8 in (2.03 m)	220 lb (100 kg)	1945-09-17	North Dakota
PF	26	Eddie Mast	6 ft 9 in (2.06 m)	220 lb (100 kg)	1948-10-03	Temple
G	5	Mike Price	6 ft 3 in (1.91 m)	200 lb (91 kg)	1948-09-11	Illinois
C	19	Willis Reed	6 ft 9 in (2.06 m)	235 lb (107 kg)	1942-06-25	Grambling State
SG	6	Mike Riordan	6 ft 4 in (1.93 m)	200 lb (91 kg)	1945-07-09	Providence
SF	33	Cazzie Russell	6 ft 5 in (1.96 m)	218 lb (99 kg)	1944-06-07	Michigan
SF	9	Dave Stallworth	6 ft 7 in (2.01 m)	200 lb (91 kg)	1941-12-20	Wichita State

Coaches
Head coach
- Red Holzman

Legend
- (DP) Unsigned draft pick
- (FA) Free agent
- (S) Suspended
- Injured

== Regular season ==
=== Season standings ===
Atlantic Division	W	L	PCT	GB	Home	Road	Neutral	Div
y-New York Knicks	52	30	.634	–	32–9	19–20	1–1	10–6
x-Philadelphia 76ers	47	35	.573	5	24–15	21–18	2–2	10–6
Boston Celtics	44	38	.537	8	25–14	18–22	1–2	8–8
Buffalo Braves	22	60	.268	30	14–23	6–30	2–7	2–10

#	Eastern Conference			
#	Team	W	L	PCT
1	z-New York Knicks	52	30	.634
2	y-Baltimore Bullets	42	40	.512
3	x-Philadelphia 76ers	47	35	.573
4	x-Atlanta Hawks	36	46	.439
5	Boston Celtics	44	38	.537
6	Cincinnati Royals	33	49	.402
7	Buffalo Braves	22	60	.268
8	Cleveland Cavaliers	15	67	.183

z – clinched division title
y – clinched division title
x – clinched playoff spot

=== Game log ===
1970–71 game log
#	Date	Opponent	Score	High points	Record
1	October 13	Boston	107–114	Willis Reed (35)	1–0
2	October 14	@ Cincinnati	128–104	Cazzie Russell (29)	2–0
3	October 17	Chicago	99–96	Dave DeBusschere (22)	2–1
4	October 20	Los Angeles	100–115	Willis Reed (29)	3–1
5	October 22	San Francisco	92–95	Cazzie Russell (20)	4–1
6	October 23	@ Baltimore	92–98	Willis Reed (25)	4–2
7	October 24	Cincinnati	103–115	Dave DeBusschere (24)	5–2
8	October 27	Seattle	104–117	Dave DeBusschere (22)	6–2
9	October 28	@ Boston	126–89	Willis Reed (22)	7–2
10	October 29	San Diego	107–114	Dick Barnett (26)	8–2
11	October 31	Detroit	89–107	Walt Frazier (22)	9–2
12	November 2	@ San Francisco	111–99	Walt Frazier (27)	10–2
13	November 4	@ San Diego	109–100	Walt Frazier (25)	11–2
14	November 6	@ Los Angeles	104–106	Willis Reed (24)	11–3
15	November 8	@ Portland	125–113	Frazier, Reed (28)	12–3
16	November 10	@ Seattle	91–93	Willis Reed (32)	12–4
17	November 12	Baltimore	110–108	Willis Reed (34)	12–5
18	November 13	@ Chicago	106–98	Dave DeBusschere (24)	13–5
19	November 14	Philadelphia	94–126	Walt Frazier (23)	14–5
20	November 17	Phoenix	100–103	Willis Reed (19)	15–5
21	November 18	@ Philadelphia	106–113	Walt Frazier (24)	15–6
22	November 19	Cincinnati	106–98	Walt Frazier (28)	15–7
23	November 21	Cleveland	94–102	Dick Barnett (24)	16–7
24	November 24	Atlanta	119–128	Walt Frazier (33)	17–7
25	November 25	@ Atlanta	114–111	Willis Reed (35)	18–7
26	November 27	@ Milwaukee	103–94	Willis Reed (34)	19–7
27	November 28	Milwaukee	99–100	Dave DeBusschere (21)	20–7
28	December 1	Seattle	109–114	Willis Reed (35)	21–7
29	December 2	@ Detroit	82–101	Willis Reed (17)	21–8
30	December 4	@ Buffalo	91–97	Willis Reed (31)	21–9
31	December 5	Buffalo	93–117	Frazier, Reed (23)	22–9
32	December 8	Portland	121–139	Willis Reed (37)	23–9
33	December 12	Philadelphia	101–118	Willis Reed (25)	24–9
34	December 13	N San Francisco	101–94	Walt Frazier (24)	24–10
35	December 15	Cleveland	92–110	Walt Frazier (25)	25–10
36	December 16	@ Cleveland	108–84	Walt Frazier (22)	26–10
37	December 19	Chicago	87–98	Dave Stallworth (22)	27–10
38	December 20	@ Phoenix	133–118	Walt Frazier (26)	28–10
39	December 22	@ Seattle	108–119	Dave DeBusschere (27)	28–11
40	December 25	Buffalo	102–115	Dick Barnett (24)	29–11
41	December 27	Baltimore	105–110	Walt Frazier (33)	30–11
42	December 30	San Francisco	103–111	Walt Frazier (29)	31–11
43	January 2	Atlanta	112–108	Walt Frazier (28)	31–12
44	January 6	@ Cleveland	127–94	Cazzie Russell (18)	32–12
45	January 7	@ Milwaukee	106–116	Walt Frazier (23)	32–13
46	January 9	@ Portland	96–114	Dick Barnett (23)	32–14
47	January 14	@ Phoenix	88–107	Dave DeBusschere (23)	32–15
48	January 16	@ San Francisco	93–102	Walt Frazier (21)	32–16
49	January 19	San Diego	113–117 (OT)	Bill Bradley (27)	33–16
50	January 20	@ Chicago	103–109	Walt Frazier (30)	33–17
51	January 23	Boston	107–128	Walt Frazier (32)	34–17
52	January 24	@ Detroit	117–105	Willis Reed (24)	35–17
53	January 26	Milwaukee	98–107	Willis Reed (35)	36–17
54	January 27	@ Atlanta	116–108	Walt Frazier (26)	37–17
55	January 29	@ Boston	118–111	Willis Reed (29)	38–17
56	January 30	Philadelphia	106–105	Walt Frazier (28)	38–18
57	January 31	N Baltimore	125–95	Walt Frazier (29)	39–18
58	February 2	Cincinnati	108–115	Willis Reed (27)	40–18
59	February 5	@ Detroit	99–108	Willis Reed (35)	40–19
60	February 6	Chicago	109–102	Cazzie Russell (25)	40–20
61	February 7	@ Philadelphia	99–127	Barnett, Reed (20)	40–21
62	February 9	Atlanta	114–109	Willis Reed (24)	40–22
63	February 10	@ Buffalo	99–106	Dick Barnett (21)	40–23
64	February 12	@ Atlanta	116–125	Walt Frazier (33)	40–24
65	February 13	Phoenix	97–114	Dick Barnett (30)	41–24
66	February 16	@ Los Angeles	115–130	Willis Reed (23)	41–25
67	February 18	@ San Diego	116–115	Walt Frazier (36)	42–25
68	February 20	Detroit	94–108	Bill Bradley (23)	43–25
69	February 23	San Diego	126–109	Barnett, DeBusschere (24)	43–26
70	February 24	@ Cincinnati	125–105	Walt Frazier (26)	44–26
71	February 27	Portland	102–113	Willis Reed (35)	45–26
72	February 28	@ Baltimore	110–104	Walt Frazier (25)	46–26
73	March 2	Baltimore	95–109	Willis Reed (21)	47–26
74	March 5	@ Philadelphia	116–121	Willis Reed (26)	47–27
75	March 6	Boston	104–112	Walt Frazier (39)	48–27
76	March 7	@ Boston	116–110	Walt Frazier (34)	49–27
77	March 9	Seattle	114–99	Walt Frazier (19)	49–28
78	March 10	@ Cincinnati	118–120 (OT)	Dave DeBusschere (29)	49–29
79	March 13	Milwaukee	103–108	Dave DeBusschere (33)	50–29
80	March 16	Los Angeles	82–115	Walt Frazier (22)	51–29
81	March 18	@ Phoenix	131–123 (OT)	Dick Barnett (30)	52–29
82	March 21	@ Los Angeles	98–101	Cazzie Russell (16)	52–30

== Playoffs ==
1971 playoff game log
Conference semifinals: 4–1 (home: 2–1; road: 2–0)

Game	Date	Team	Score	High points	High rebounds	High assists	Location Attendance	Series
1	March 25	Atlanta	W 112–101	Bill Bradley (25)	Willis Reed (22)	Bill Bradley (4)	Madison Square Garden; 19,500	1–0
2	March 27	Atlanta	L 104–113	Walt Frazier (29)	Dave DeBusschere (15)	Bill Bradley (4)	Madison Square Garden; 19,500	1–1
3	March 28	@ Atlanta	W 110–95	Willis Reed (26)	Dave DeBusschere (17)	Walt Frazier (9)	Alexander Memorial Coliseum; 7,192	2–1
4	March 30	@ Atlanta	W 113–107	Walt Frazier (26)	Dave DeBusschere (13)	Walt Frazier (8)	Alexander Memorial Coliseum; 7,192	3–1
5	April 1	Atlanta	W 111–107	Dave DeBusschere (29)	Dave DeBusschere (22)	Willis Reed (5)	Madison Square Garden; 19,500	4–1

Conference finals: 3–4 (home: 3–1; road: 0–3)

Game	Date	Team	Score	High points	High rebounds	High assists	Location Attendance	Series
1	April 6	Baltimore	W 112–111	Walt Frazier (24)	Dave DeBusschere (17)	Walt Frazier (7)	Madison Square Garden; 19,500	1–0
2	April 9	Baltimore	W 107–88	Dick Barnett (14)	Dave DeBusschere (14)	Walt Frazier (5)	Madison Square Garden; 19,500	2–0
3	April 11	@ Baltimore	L 88–114	Walt Frazier (17)	Willis Reed (10)	Barnett, Bradley (5)	Baltimore Civic Center; 8,083	2–1
4	April 14	@ Baltimore	L 80–101	Walt Frazier (16)	Dave DeBusschere (9)	Walt Frazier (5)	Baltimore Civic Center; 12,289	2–2
5	April 16	Baltimore	W 89–84	Walt Frazier (28)	Dave DeBusschere (17)	Bill Bradley (4)	Madison Square Garden; 19,500	3–2
6	April 18	@ Baltimore	L 96–113	Dave DeBusschere (24)	Dave DeBusschere (10)	Dick Barnett (5)	Baltimore Civic Center; 11,211	3–3
7	April 19	Baltimore	L 91–93	Dick Barnett (26)	Willis Reed (12)	Walt Frazier (4)	Madison Square Garden; 19,500	3–4

1971 schedule

== Player statistics ==
Legend
GP	Games played	GS	Games started	MPG	Minutes per game
FG%	Field-goal percentage	3P%	3-point field-goal percentage	FT%	Free-throw percentage
RPG	Rebounds per game	APG	Assists per game	SPG	Steals per game
BPG	Blocks per game	PPG	Points per game

== Awards and records ==
- Willis Reed, All-NBA Second Team
- Walt Frazier, All-NBA Second Team
- Dave DeBusschere, NBA All-Defensive First Team
- Walt Frazier, NBA All-Defensive First Team
