= 1970–71 NBA season =

25th NBA season

- League: National Basketball Association
- Sport: Basketball
- Duration: October 13, 1970 – March 23, 1971; March 24 – April 19, 1971 (Playoffs); April 21–30, 1971 (Finals)
- Games: 82
- Teams: 17
- TV partner: ABC

Draft
- Top draft pick: Bob Lanier
- Picked by: Detroit Pistons

Regular season
- Top seed: Milwaukee Bucks
- Season MVP: Lew Alcindor (Milwaukee)
- Top scorer: Lew Alcindor (Milwaukee)

Playoffs
- Eastern champions: Baltimore Bullets
- Eastern runners-up: New York Knicks
- Western champions: Milwaukee Bucks
- Western runners-up: Los Angeles Lakers

Finals
- Champions: Milwaukee Bucks
- Runners-up: Baltimore Bullets
- Finals MVP: Lew Alcindor (Milwaukee)

NBA seasons
- ← 1969–70 1971–72 →

The 1970–71 NBA season was the 25th season of the National Basketball Association. The season ended with the Milwaukee Bucks winning the NBA championship, beating the Baltimore Bullets 4 games to 0 in the NBA Finals. Three new teams made their debut: the Cleveland Cavaliers, the Portland Trail Blazers, and the Buffalo Braves.

== Notable occurrences ==
- For the first time, the league was divided into Conferences (Eastern and Western), each with two divisions. The Detroit Pistons and Milwaukee Bucks were shifted from the old Eastern Division to the Western Conference's Midwest Division, and the Atlanta Hawks were switched from the Western Division to the Eastern Conference's Central Division.
- The NBA expanded to 17 teams as the Portland Trail Blazers, Buffalo Braves, and Cleveland Cavaliers began play. Additionally, there was supposed to have been an 18th team added alongside those three teams with a team created in Houston, but that team would end up folding six weeks after initially being announced alongside the other three teams when its investment group led by Alan Rothenberg failed to make the $750,000 down payment on the $3.7 million entrance fee required before the league's college player draft in the 1970 NBA draft began.
- Before the season, on June 18, 1970, the NBA owners voted 13–4, to seek approval from Congress for a merger with the 11-team American Basketball Association into a 28-team league that would retain the NBA name. The NBA players opposed the merger, and Oscar Robertson filed an antitrust lawsuit that prevented further proceedings.
- The 1971 NBA All-Star Game was played at the San Diego Sports Arena in San Diego, with the West beating the East 108–107. Lenny Wilkens of the Seattle SuperSonics won the game's MVP award.
- The Rookie of the Year award was shared by two players for the first time in league history. They were Dave Cowens of the Boston Celtics and Geoff Petrie of the Portland Trail Blazers.
- In only their third year of existence, the Bucks won the NBA championship, sweeping the Baltimore Bullets in four straight games. This was the first NBA finals to feature none of the NBA's foundation franchises; the Bullets franchise had joined the NBA as the Chicago Packers in 1961, and the Bucks franchise had joined in 1968. It was also the first NBA finals since 1956 to feature neither Bill Russell or Wilt Chamberlain.
- Among those who retired this season include Al Attles, Bob Boozer, Connie Dierking, Bailey Howell, Tom Meschery and Adrian Smith.

Coaching changes
Offseason
Team	1969–70 coach	1970–71 coach
Buffalo Braves	Expansion	Dolph Schayes
Cleveland Cavaliers	Expansion	Bill Fitch
Portland Trail Blazers	Expansion	Rolland Todd
San Francisco Warriors	George C. Lee	Al Attles

== Final standings ==
=== By division ===
Atlantic Division	W	L	PCT	GB	Home	Road	Neutral	Div
y-New York Knicks	52	30	.634	–	32–9	19–20	1–1	10–6
x-Philadelphia 76ers	47	35	.573	5	24–15	21–18	2–2	10–6
Boston Celtics	44	38	.537	8	25–14	18–22	1–2	8–8
Buffalo Braves	22	60	.268	30	14–23	6–30	2–7	2–10

Central Division	W	L	PCT	GB	Home	Road	Neutral	Div
y-Baltimore Bullets	42	40	.512	–	24–13	16–25	2–2	10–6
x-Atlanta Hawks	36	46	.439	6	21–20	14–26	1–0	9–7
Cincinnati Royals	33	49	.402	9	17–16	11–28	5–5	16–6
Cleveland Cavaliers	15	67	.183	27	11–30	2–37	2–0	1–13

Midwest Division	W	L	PCT	GB	Home	Road	Neutral	Div
y-Milwaukee Bucks	66	16	.805	–	34–2	28–13	4–1	14–4
x-Chicago Bulls	51	31	.622	15	30–11	17–19	4–1	7–11
Phoenix Suns	48	34	.585	18	27–14	19–20	2–0	9–9
Detroit Pistons	45	37	.549	21	24–17	20–19	1–1	6–12

Pacific Division	W	L	PCT	GB	Home	Road	Neutral	Div
y-Los Angeles Lakers	48	34	.585	–	30–11	17–22	1–1	15–7
x-San Francisco Warriors	41	41	.500	7	20–18	19–21	2–2	12–10
San Diego Rockets	40	42	.488	8	24–15	15–26	1–1	14–8
Seattle SuperSonics	38	44	.463	10	27–13	11–30	0–1	10–14
Portland Trail Blazers	29	53	.354	19	18–21	9–26	2–6	3–15

=== By conference ===
#	Eastern Conference			
#	Team	W	L	PCT
1	z-New York Knicks	52	30	.634
2	y-Baltimore Bullets	42	40	.512
3	x-Philadelphia 76ers	47	35	.573
4	x-Atlanta Hawks	36	46	.439
5	Boston Celtics	44	38	.537
6	Cincinnati Royals	33	49	.402
7	Buffalo Braves	22	60	.268
8	Cleveland Cavaliers	15	67	.183

#	Western Conference			
#	Team	W	L	PCT
1	z-Milwaukee Bucks	66	16	.805
2	y-Los Angeles Lakers	48	34	.585
3	x-Chicago Bulls	51	31	.622
4	x-San Francisco Warriors	41	41	.500
5	Phoenix Suns	48	34	.585
6	Detroit Pistons	45	37	.549
7	San Diego Rockets	40	42	.488
8	Seattle SuperSonics	38	44	.463
9	Portland Trail Blazers	29	53	.354

Notes

- z, y – division champions
- x – clinched playoff spot

== Playoffs ==
Conference Semifinals
A1	New York*	4
C2	Atlanta	1
Eastern Conference
C1	Baltimore*	4
A2	Philadelphia	3
M1	Milwaukee*	4
P2	San Francisco	1
Western Conference
P1	Los Angeles*	4
M2	Chicago	3

Conference Finals
A1	New York*	3
C1	Baltimore*	4
M1	Milwaukee*	4
P1	Los Angeles*	1

NBA Finals
C1	Baltimore*	0
M1	Milwaukee*	4

- * Division winner
- Bold Series winner
- Italic Team with home-court advantage

== Statistics leaders ==
Category	Player	Team	Stat
Points per game	Lew Alcindor	Milwaukee Bucks	31.7
Rebounds per game	Wilt Chamberlain	Los Angeles Lakers	18.2
Assists per game	Norm Van Lier	Cincinnati Royals	10.1
FG%	Johnny Green	Cincinnati Royals	.587
FT%	Chet Walker	Chicago Bulls	.859

== NBA awards ==
- Most Valuable Player: Lew Alcindor, Milwaukee Bucks
- Co-Rookies of the Year: Geoff Petrie, Portland Trail Blazers and Dave Cowens, Boston Celtics
- Coach of the Year: Dick Motta, Chicago Bulls
- All-NBA First Team:
  - G – Dave Bing, Detroit Pistons
  - G – Jerry West, Los Angeles Lakers
  - C – Lew Alcindor, Milwaukee Bucks
  - F – Billy Cunningham, Philadelphia 76ers
  - F – John Havlicek, Boston Celtics
- All-NBA Second Team:
  - F – Gus Johnson, Baltimore Bullets
  - F – Bob Love, Chicago Bulls
  - C – Willis Reed, New York Knicks
  - G – Walt Frazier, New York Knicks
  - G – Oscar Robertson, Milwaukee Bucks
- All-NBA Rookie Team:
  - Geoff Petrie, Portland Trail Blazers
  - Bob Lanier, Detroit Pistons
  - Calvin Murphy, San Diego Rockets
  - Dave Cowens, Boston Celtics
  - Pete Maravich, Atlanta Hawks
- NBA All-Defensive First Team:
  - Dave DeBusschere, New York Knicks
  - Gus Johnson, Baltimore Bullets
  - Nate Thurmond, San Francisco Warriors
  - Walt Frazier, New York Knicks
  - Jerry West, Los Angeles Lakers
- NBA All-Defensive Second Team:
  - John Havlicek, Boston Celtics
  - Paul Silas, Phoenix Suns
  - Lew Alcindor, Milwaukee Bucks
  - Jerry Sloan, Chicago Bulls
  - Norm Van Lier, Cincinnati Royals

== See also ==
- 1971 NBA Finals
- 1971 NBA playoffs
- 1970–71 ABA season
- List of NBA regular season records
