= 1968–69 Seattle SuperSonics season =

NBA professional basketball team season

- Head coach: Al Bianchi
- General manager: Dick Vertlieb
- Owners: Sam Schulman
- Arena: Seattle Center Coliseum

Results
- Record: 30–52 (.366)
- Place: Division: 6th (Western)
- Playoff finish: Did not qualify
- Stats at Basketball Reference

Local media
- Television: KING-TV (Rod Belcher)
- Radio: KOMO (Bob Blackburn)

The 1968–69 Seattle SuperSonics season was the second season of the Seattle franchise in the NBA. The Sonics finished the regular season with a 30–52 record in 6th place on the Western Division. During the offseason, Seattle traded their top scorer Walt Hazzard to the Atlanta Hawks to bring three-time All-Star Lenny Wilkens, who would serve as head coach of the team the following year.

== Offseason ==
=== Draft ===
Round	Pick	Player	Position	Nationality	College
1	3	Bob Kauffman	F/C	United States	Guilford
2	16	Art Harris	G	United States	Stanford
3	24	Jeff Ockel	C	United States	Utah
3	34	Ed Johnson	C	United States	Tennessee State
4	38	Henry Logan	G	United States	Western Carolina
5	52	Al Hairston	G	United States	Bowling Green
6	66	Ron Guziak	F	United States	Duquesne
7	80	Jim McKean	C	United States	Washington State
8	94	Willie Rogers	G	United States	Oklahoma
9	108	Jimmy Smith	G	United States	Utah State
10	122	Joe Kennedy	F	United States	Duke
11	136	Jim Marsh	F	United States	USC
12	149	Walt Simon	G	United States	Utah
13	162	Bud Ogden	F	United States	Santa Clara
14	173	Mike Warren	G	United States	UCLA

== Roster ==
1968–69 Seattle SuperSonics roster
Players

Pos.	No.	Player	Height	Weight	DOB	From
G	25	Al Hairston	6 ft 1 in (1.85 m)	170 lb (77 kg)	1945–12–11	Bowling Green
G	12	Art Harris	6 ft 4 in (1.93 m)	185 lb (84 kg)	1947–01–13	Stanford
F/C	22	Bob Kauffman	6 ft 8 in (2.03 m)	240 lb (109 kg)	1947–01–12	Guilford
SG	11	Tommy Kron	6 ft 5 in (1.96 m)	200 lb (91 kg)	1943–02–28	Kentucky
SF	43	Plummer Lott	6 ft 5 in (1.96 m)	210 lb (95 kg)	1945–12–11	Seattle
PF	14	Tom Meschery	6 ft 6 in (1.98 m)	215 lb (98 kg)	1938–10–26	Saint Mary's
F/C	24	Erwin Mueller	6 ft 8 in (2.03 m)	230 lb (104 kg)	1944–03–12	San Francisco
F/C	41	Dorie Murrey	6 ft 8 in (2.03 m)	215 lb (98 kg)	1943–09–07	Detroit Mercy
F/C	45	Bob Rule	6 ft 9 in (2.06 m)	220 lb (100 kg)	1944–06–29	Colorado State
SG	44	Rod Thorn	6 ft 4 in (1.93 m)	195 lb (88 kg)	1941–05–23	West Virginia
F/C	30	John Tresvant	6 ft 7 in (2.01 m)	215 lb (98 kg)	1939–11–06	Seattle
G	19	Lenny Wilkens	6 ft 1 in (1.85 m)	180 lb (82 kg)	1937–10–28	Providence

Coaches
Head coach
- Al Bianchi

Legend
- (DP) Unsigned draft pick
- (FA) Free agent
- (S) Suspended
- Injured

== Standings ==
Western Division	W	L	PCT	GB	Home	Road	Neutral	Div
x-Los Angeles Lakers	55	27	.671	–	32–9	21–18	2–0	30–10
x-Atlanta Hawks	48	34	.585	7	28–12	18–21	2–1	26–14
x-San Francisco Warriors	41	41	.500	14	22–19	18–21	1–1	20–20
x-San Diego Rockets	37	45	.451	18	25–16	8–25	4–4	20–20
Chicago Bulls	33	49	.402	22	19–21	12–25	2–3	19–21
Seattle SuperSonics	30	52	.366	25	18–18	6–29	6–5	15–23
Phoenix Suns	16	66	.195	39	11–26	4–28	1–12	8–30

x – clinched playoff spot

== Game log ==
1968–69 game log
Total: 30–52 (Home: 18–18; Road: 6–29; Neutral: 6–5)
October: 2–6 (home: 2–4; road: 0–2)

Game	Date	Team	Score	High points	High rebounds	High assists	Location Attendance	Record
1	October 17	@ San Diego	L 110–128	Bob Rule (31)	Bob Rule (11)	Lenny Wilkens (10)	San Diego Sports Arena; 5,332	0–1
2	October 18	@ Phoenix	L 107–116	Bob Rule (34)	Tom Meschery (19)	Rod Thorn (7)	Arizona Veterans Memorial Coliseum; 7,112	0–2
3	October 19	San Francisco	L 95–107	Bob Rule (25)	Tom Meschery (18)	Lenny Wilkens (9)	Seattle Center Coliseum; 4,311	0–3
4	October 21	Baltimore	L 104–111	Tom Meschery (30)	Meshery, Wilkens (14)	Rod Thorn (9)	Vancouver, BC; 2,387	0–4
5	October 23	San Diego	W 118–117	Bob Rule, Lenny Wilkens (20)	Tom Meschery (17)	Lenny Wilkens (10)	Seattle Center Coliseum; 3,064	1–4
6	October 25	Atlanta	W 123–112	Tom Meschery (24)	Tom Meschery (16)	Lenny Wilkens (11)	Seattle Center Coliseum; 4,689	2–4
7	October 27	Baltimore	L 114–126	Tom Meschery (22)	Bob Rule (13)	Lenny Wilkens (13)	Seattle Center Coliseum; 4,882	2–5
8	October 30	Phoenix	L 108–115	Bob Rule (22)	Bob Rule (19)	Lenny Wilkens (8)	Seattle Center Coliseum; 2,657	2–6

November: 8–11 (home: 7–3; road: 1–8)

Game	Date	Team	Score	High points	High rebounds	High assists	Location Attendance	Record
9	November 2	Chicago	W 101–95	Bob Rule (24)	Bob Rule (16)	Lennie Wilkins (15)	Seattle Center Coliseum; 4,330	3–6
10	November 3	New York	L 108–122	Lenny Wilkens (24)	Tom Meschery, Al Tucker (9)		Seattle Center Coliseum; 4,807	3–7
11	November 6	@ Detroit	L 118–127	Rod Thorn (21)			Cobo Arena; 3,462	3–8
12	November 7	@ Chicago	L 105–120	Bob Rule (23)			Chicago Stadium; 891	3–9
13	November 8	@ Boston	W 114–112	Bob Rule (37)			Boston Garden; 7,606	4–9
14	November 9	@ Philadelphia	L 94–114	Lenny Wilkens (26)			The Spectrum; 6,756	4–10
15	November 11	Philadelphia	L 117–127	Bob Rule (29)			Boston, MA	4–11
16	November 12	@ Milwaukee	L 114–127	Bob Rule (28)			Milwaukee Arena; 4,455	4–12
17	November 13	Atlanta	L 113–142	Lenny Wilkens (27)			Seattle Center Coliseum; 3,102	4–13
18	November 15	Phoenix	W 128–124 (2OT)	Lenny Wilkens (30)			Seattle Center Coliseum; 4,368	5–13
19	November 16	Detroit	W 123–119	Bob Rule (42)			Seattle Center Coliseum; 5,446	6–13
20	November 17	@ Los Angeles	L 94–105	Lenny Wilkens (16)			The Forum; 8,399	6–14
21	November 20	Boston	L 92–139	Art Harris (16)			Seattle Center Coliseum; 7,021	6–15
22	November 22	@ San Diego	L 111–126	Bob Rule (24)			San Diego Sports Arena; 5,247	6–16
23	November 23	@ San Francisco	L 119–132	Lenny Wilkens (25)			Oakland–Alameda County Coliseum Arena; 5,922	6–17
24	November 24	Milwaukee	W 141–120	Tom Meschery, Lenny Wilkens (21)			Seattle Center Coliseum; 3,485	7–17
25	November 25	Milwaukee	W 123–113	Lenny Wilkens (29)			Vancouver, BC; 2,879	8–17
26	November 26	Chicago	W 99–98	Bob Rule (28)			Seattle Center Coliseum; 2,895	9–17
27	November 28	Milwaukee	W 115–103	Bob Rule (27)			Seattle Center Coliseum; 5,210	10–17

December: 4–11 (home: 2–5; road: 2–6)

Game	Date	Team	Score	High points	High rebounds	High assists	Location Attendance	Record
28	December 2	@ Phoenix	W 118–108	Lenny Wilkens (33)			Arizona Veterans Memorial Coliseum; 2,171	11–17
29	December 3	@ San Francisco	L 122 127	Lenny Wilkens (31)			Oakland–Alameda County Coliseum Arena; 2,116	11–18
30	December 6	San Francisco	W 109–100 (OT)	Tom Meschery (29)			Seattle Center Coliseum; 5,941	12–18
31	December 7	@ San Francisco	W 115–107	Bob Rule (31)			Oakland–Alameda County Coliseum Arena; 3,754	13–18
32	December 12	Atlanta	L 91–93	Lenny Wilkens (25)			Seattle Center Coliseum; 4,361	13–19
33	December 14	Los Angeles	L 120–136	Tom Meschery, Bob Rule (27)			Seattle Center Coliseum; 12,186	13–20
34	December 15	@ Los Angeles	L 114–115	Bob Rule (37)			The Forum; 6,878	13–21
35	December 18	Philadelphia	L 111–115	Bob Rule (36)			Seattle Center Coliseum; 3,389	13–22
36	December 20	@ Milwaukee	L 92–100	Lenny Wilkens (21)			Milwaukee Arena; 5,303	13–23
37	December 21	@ New York	L 105–131	Bob Rule (19)			Madison Square Garden; 13,998	13–24
38	December 25	@ Baltimore	L 112–118	Bob Rule, Lenny Wilkens (27)			Baltimore Civic Center; 5,261	13–25
39	December 26	@ Atlanta	L 96–126	Al Tucker (18)			Alexander Memorial Coliseum; 3,697	13–26
40	December 28	New York	L 108–111	Lenny Wilkens (19)			Seattle Center Coliseum; 7,602	13–27
41	December 29	New York	L 112–120	Art Harris (21)			Vancouver, BC; 2,894	13–28
42	December 30	Phoenix	W 120–118	Art Harris, Rule (24)			Seattle Center Coliseum; 3,920	14–28

January: 5–9 (home: 1–1; road: 4–8)

Game	Date	Team	Score	High points	High rebounds	High assists	Location Attendance	Record
43	January 4	@ San Diego	L 105–122	Lenny Wilkens (28)			San Diego Sports Arena; 4,878	14–29
44	January 6	Boston	L 97–121	Bob Rule (36)			Seattle Center Coliseum; 6,636	14–30
45	January 7	@ Phoenix	L 112–116	Three players (23)			Arizona Veterans Memorial Coliseum; 2,875	14–31
46	January 9	Cincinnati	W 119–110	Bob Rule (32)			Cleveland, OH; 2,017	15–31
47	January 10	@ Milwaukee	L 104–115	Bob Rule, Al Tucker (17)			Milwaukee Arena; 4,150	15–32
48	January 11	@ Chicago	L 86–119	Lenny Wilkens (21)			Chicago Stadium; 3,870	15–33
49	January 17	New York	L 94–114	Bob Rule (16)			Philadelphia, PA	15–34
50	January 18	@ Boston	L 97–111	Bob Rule (29)			Boston Garden; 9,320	15–35
51	January 21	@ New York	L 106–113	Lenny Wilkens (31)			Madison Square Garden; 11,227	15–36
52	January 22	@ Baltimore	W 98–94	Lenny Wilkens (22)			Baltimore Civic Center; 3,619	16–36
53	January 27	Milwaukee	W 128–107	Bob Rule (31)			Tacoma, WA; 4,150	17–36
54	January 29	Boston	W 124–122 (OT)	Bob Rule (26)			Philadelphia, PA	18–36
55	January 30	Detroit	L 118–144	Bob Rule (26)			Baltimore, MD	18–37
56	January 31	@ Atlanta	W 119–112	Bob Rule (32)			Alexander Memorial Coliseum; 3,550	19–37

February: 6–8 (home: 5–6; road: 1–2)

Game	Date	Team	Score	High points	High rebounds	High assists	Location Attendance	Record
57	February 1	@ Cincinnati	L 96–111	Bob Rule (20)			Cincinnati Gardens; 6,114	19–38
58	February 3	Los Angeles	W 114–107	Bob Rule (38)			Seattle Center Coliseum; 7,721	20–38
59	February 4	@ San Francisco	W 116–111	Lenny Wilkens (28)			Oakland–Alameda County Coliseum Arena; 2,145	21–38
60	February 5	Philadelphia	L 115–119	Art Harris, Rule (27)			Seattle Center Coliseum; 4,956	21–39
61	February 7	Cincinnati	W 102–97	Lenny Wilkens (32)			Seattle Center Coliseum; 7,350	22–39
62	February 9	San Francisco	L 120–121	Bob Rule (31)			Seattle Center Coliseum; 7,545	22–40
63	February 12	Los Angeles	L 92–109	Bob Rule (24)			Seattle Center Coliseum; 11,218	22–41
64	February 16	Detroit	W 127–119	Bob Rule (36)			Seattle Center Coliseum; 6,367	23–41
65	February 18	Chicago	W 114–113	Bob Rule (27)			Seattle Center Coliseum; 5,002	24–41
66	February 19	Detroit	L 124–131	Bob Rule (32)			Seattle Center Coliseum; 3,356	24–42
67	February 21	Philadelphia	L 109–115	Bob Rule (31)			Seattle Center Coliseum; 8,638	24–43
68	February 23	Boston	W 118–116	Lenny Wilkens (35)			Seattle Center Coliseum; 8,742	25–43
69	February 25	@ Los Angeles	L 111–114 (OT)	Lenny Wilkens (26)			The Forum; 10,311	25–44
70	February 26	Chicago	L 122–124	Bob Rule (30)			Seattle Center Coliseum; 4,138	25–45

March: 5–7 (home: 4–1; road: 1–6)

Game	Date	Team	Score	High points	High rebounds	High assists	Location Attendance	Record
71	March 1	Cincinnati	W 134–122	Bob Rule (47)			Seattle Center Coliseum; 9,477	26–45
72	March 3	Cincinnati	L 107–113	Bob Rule (32)			Seattle Center Coliseum; 4,028	26–46
73	March 4	San Diego	W 130–116	Lenny Wilkens (33)			Seattle Center Coliseum; 5,010	27–46
74	March 8	Baltimore	W 138–117	Lenny Wilkens (32)			Seattle Center Coliseum; 12,382	28–46
75	March 12	San Diego	W 125–112	Lenny Wilkens (36)			Vancouver, BC; 5,998	29–46
76	March 13	Milwaukee	W 141–118	Tom Meschery (21)			Green Bay, WI; 3,461	30–46
77	March 15	@ Chicago	L 83–101	Lenny Wilkens (26)			Chicago Stadium; 5,254	30–47
78	March 16	@ Atlanta	L 127–131 (OT)	Art Harris (31)			Alexander Memorial Coliseum; 7,190	30–48
79	March 18	@ Baltimore	L 120–130	Lenny Wilkens (26)			Baltimore Civic Center; 8,020	30–49
80	March 19	@ Philadelphia	L 115–136	Bob Rule, Rod Thorn (16)			The Spectrum; 11,474	30–50
81	March 21	@ Detroit	L 104–110	Erwin Mueller (15)			Cobo Arena; 4,669	30–51
82	March 22	@ Cincinnati	L 127–134	Lenny Wilkens (25)			Cincinnati Gardens; 2,534	30–52

1968–69 schedule

== Player statistics ==
Legend
GP	Games played	GS	Games started	MPG	Minutes per game
FG%	Field-goal percentage	3P%	3-point field-goal percentage	FT%	Free-throw percentage
RPG	Rebounds per game	APG	Assists per game	SPG	Steals per game
BPG	Blocks per game	PPG	Points per game

Player	GP	GS	MPG	FG%	3FG%	FT%	RPG	APG	SPG	BPG	PPG
Art Harris	80	–	32.0	.395	–	.641	3.8	3.2	–	–	12.4
Al Hairston	39	–	7.0	.333	–	.571	.9	1.0	–	–	2.2
Bob Kauffman	82	–	20.2	.442	–	.702	5.9	1.0	–	–	7.8
Joe Kennedy	72	–	17.2	.395	–	.790	3.3	.8	–	–	6.2
Tommy Kron	76	–	14.8	.392	–	.701	2.8	2.5	–	–	5.1
Plummer Lott	23	–	7.0	.258	–	.400	1.3	0.3	–	–	1.6
Tom Meschery	82	–	32.6	.453	–	.736	10.0	2.4	–	–	14.0
Erwin Mueller ^{[a]}	26	–	18.6	.431	–	.597	4.0	2.4	–	–	7.0
Dorie Murrey	38	–	12.2	.387	–	.639	3.9	.6	–	–	5.6
Bob Rule	82	–	37.9	.469	–	.682	11.5	1.7	–	–	24.0
Rod Thorn	29	–	19.6	.463	–	.732	2.9	2.8	–	–	11.5
John Tresvant ^{[a]}	26	–	30.8	.488	–	.673	10.3	2.4	–	–	13.6
Al Tucker ^{[a]}	56	–	22.5	.432	–	.637	5.7	1.0	–	–	10.3
Lenny Wilkens	82	–	42.2	.440		.770	6.2	8.2	–	–	22.4

- ^{a} Statistics with the Seattle SuperSonics.

== Awards and records ==
- Art Harris was selected to the NBA All-Rookie First Team.
- Lenny Wilkens made his sixth All-Star appearance for the West in the 1969 NBA All-Star Game held in Baltimore, Maryland.

== Transactions ==
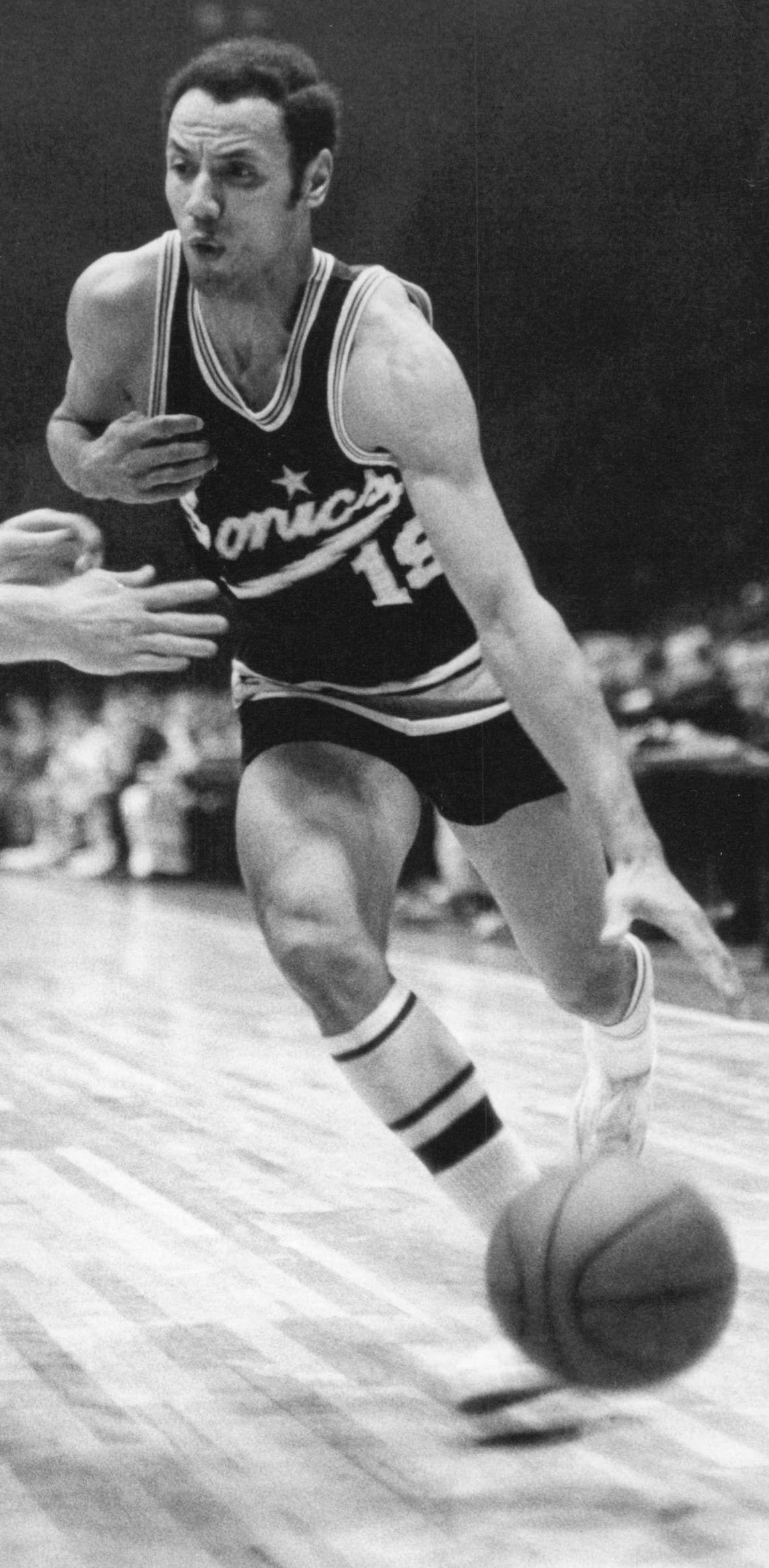
Lenny Wilkens averaged 22.4 points, 6.2 rebounds, and 8.2 assists per game in his first season with the SuperSonics.

=== Overview ===
Players Added

Via draft

- Al Hairston
- Art Harris
- Bob Kauffman
- Joe Kennedy

Via trade

- Erwin Mueller
- Dick Smith
- John Tresvant
- Lenny Wilkens
Players Lost

Via draft
(1968 NBA expansion draft)

- Bud Olsen (To Milwaukee)
- Bob Weiss (To Milwaukee)
- George Wilson (To Phoenix)

Via trade

- Walt Hazzard

=== Trades ===
October 12, 1968
To Seattle SuperSonics

Lenny Wilkens

To Atlanta Hawks

Walt Hazzard

November 15, 1968
To Seattle SuperSonics

Dick Smith

To Atlanta Hawks

Rights to Richie Guerin

January 31, 1969
To Seattle SuperSonics

Erwin Mueller

To Chicago Bulls

1970 fourth round pick
Cash considerations

January 31, 1969
To Seattle SuperSonics

John Tresvant

To Cincinnati Royals

Al Tucker
