= List of 1968–69 NBA season transactions =

These are the list of personnel changes in the NBA from the 1968–69 NBA season.

== Events ==
=== July 9, 1968 ===
- The Philadelphia 76ers traded Wilt Chamberlain to the Los Angeles Lakers for Jerry Chambers, Archie Clark and Darrall Imhoff.

=== August 27, 1968 ===
- The Phoenix Suns traded Em Bryant to the Boston Celtics for a 1969 2nd round draft pick (Gene Williams was later selected).

=== September 9, 1968 ===
- The Chicago Bulls sold Ken Wilburn to the New York Knicks.

=== September 11, 1968 ===
- The Phoenix Suns traded Dennis Hamilton to the Atlanta Hawks for a 1969 3rd round draft pick (Lloyd Kerr was later selected).

=== September 12, 1968 ===
- The Phoenix Suns traded Dick Cunningham to the Milwaukee Bucks for John Arthurs, cash and a future 2nd round draft pick.

=== September 23, 1968 ===
- The Chicago Bulls traded Keith Erickson to the Los Angeles Lakers for Erwin Mueller.

=== September 30, 1968 ===
- The Boston Celtics claimed Bud Olsen on waivers from the Milwaukee Bucks.

=== October 3, 1968 ===
- The Detroit Pistons waived Bob Hogsett.

=== October 8, 1968 ===
- The Milwaukee Bucks traded Johnny Egan to the Los Angeles Lakers for a future draft pick.

=== October 12, 1968 ===
- The Seattle SuperSonics traded Walt Hazzard to the Atlanta Hawks for Lenny Wilkens.
- The Detroit Pistons signed Paul Long as a free agent.

=== October 17, 1968 ===
- The Los Angeles Lakers waived Ed Biedenbach.

=== October 18, 1968 ===
- The Phoenix Suns signed Ed Biedenbach as a free agent.

=== November 1, 1968 ===
- The Chicago Bulls signed Ken Wilburn as a free agent.

=== November 6, 1968 ===
- The Phoenix Suns waived Rod Knowles.

=== November 8, 1968 ===
- The Chicago Bulls waived Ken Wilburn.
- The Phoenix Suns claimed Bob Warlick on waivers from the Milwaukee Bucks.

=== November 15, 1968 ===
- The Seattle SuperSonics traded Richie Guerin to the Atlanta Hawks for Dick Smith.

=== November 21, 1968 ===
- The Phoenix Suns waived Ed Biedenbach.

=== November 23, 1968 ===
- The Milwaukee Bucks traded Bob Love and Bob Weiss to the Chicago Bulls for Flynn Robinson.

=== December 1, 1968 ===
- The Chicago Bulls sold Jim Barnes to the Boston Celtics.

=== December 2, 1968 ===
- The Detroit Pistons fired Donnie Butcher as head coach.
- The Detroit Pistons hired Paul Seymour as head coach.

=== December 6, 1968 ===
- The Detroit Pistons claimed Bud Olsen on waivers from the Boston Celtics.

=== December 17, 1968 ===
- The Detroit Pistons traded Jim Fox and a 1969 3rd round draft pick (Lamar Green was later selected) to the Phoenix Suns for McCoy McLemore.

=== December 19, 1968 ===
- The New York Knicks traded Walt Bellamy and Howard Komives to the Detroit Pistons for Dave DeBusschere.

=== January 1, 1969 ===
- The Detroit Pistons traded Rich Niemann and cash to the Milwaukee Bucks for Dave Gambee.

=== January 20, 1969 ===
- The Philadelphia 76ers traded Jerry Chambers to the Phoenix Suns for George Wilson.

=== January 31, 1969 ===
- The Baltimore Bullets signed John Barnhill as a free agent.
- The Milwaukee Bucks traded Fred Hetzel to the Cincinnati Royals for Zaid Abdul-Aziz and cash.
- The Chicago Bulls traded Erwin Mueller to the Seattle SuperSonics for a 1970 4th round draft pick (John Davis was later selected).

=== February 1, 1969 ===
- The Cincinnati Royals traded John Tresvant to the Seattle SuperSonics for Al Tucker.

=== May 8, 1969 ===
- The Phoenix Suns traded Gary Gregor to the Atlanta Hawks for Paul Silas.

=== May 9, 1969 ===
- The Cincinnati Royals fired Ed Jucker as head coach.
- The Cincinnati Royals hired Bob Cousy as head coach.

=== May 19, 1969 ===
- Butch Van Breda Kolff resigns as head coach for Los Angeles Lakers.

=== May 21, 1969 ===
- The Detroit Pistons hired Butch Van Breda Kolff as head coach.

=== June 20, 1969 ===
- The Phoenix Suns signed Connie Hawkins as a free agent.

=== June 30, 1969 ===
- Player/Head Coach Bill Russell retired from the Boston Celtics.
- The Los Angeles Lakers hired Joe Mullaney as head coach.
