= 1968–69 Milwaukee Bucks season =

NBA professional basketball team season

- Head coach: Larry Costello
- General manager: John E. Erickson
- Owners: Milwaukee Professional Sports and Services, Inc. (Milwaukee Pro)
- Arena: Milwaukee Arena

Results
- Record: 27–55 (.329)
- Place: Division: 7th (Eastern)
- Playoff finish: Did not qualify
- Stats at Basketball Reference

The 1968–69 Milwaukee Bucks season was the Bucks' inaugural season in the NBA.

== Expansion draft ==
Player	Position	Team
Len Chappell	Forward	Detroit Pistons
Larry Costello	Guard	Philadelphia 76ers
Johnny Egan	Guard	Baltimore Bullets
Wayne Embry	Center	Boston Celtics
Dave Gambee	Forward	San Diego Rockets
Gary Gray	Guard	Cincinnati Royals
Fred Hetzel	Forward	San Francisco Warriors
Johnny Jones	Forward	Boston Celtics
Bob Love	Forward	Cincinnati Royals
Jon McGlocklin	Guard	San Diego Rockets
Jay Miller	Guard	Atlanta Hawks
Bud Olsen	Forward	Seattle SuperSonics
George Patterson	Center	Detroit Pistons
Jim Reid	Forward	Philadelphia 76ers
Guy Rodgers	Guard	Cincinnati Royals
Tom Thacker	Guard	Boston Celtics
Bob Warlick	Guard	San Francisco Warriors
Bob Weiss	Guard	Seattle SuperSonics

== Draft picks ==
Round	Pick	Player	Position	Nationality	College
1	7	Charlie Paulk	Forward	United States	Northeastern State
2	22	Gene Moore		United States	Saint Louis
3	35	Sam Williams		United States	Iowa
4	50	Greg Smith		United States	Western Kentucky
5	63	Joe Franklin		United States	Wisconsin
6	78	Fred Smith		United States	Hawaii
7	91	Tom Kondla		United States	Minnesota
8	106	Elbert Miller		United States	Nevada-Las Vegas
9	119	Cliff Berger		United States	Kentucky
10	134	Eugene Jones		United States	Missouri
11	146	Brad Luchini		United States	Marquette
12	159	Dave Miller		United States	Florida

== Roster ==
1968–69 Milwaukee Bucks roster
Players

Pos.	No.	Player	Height	Weight	DOB	From
F	50	Len Chappell	6 ft 8 in (2.03 m)	240 lb (109 kg)	1941–01–31	Wake Forest
C	19	Dick Cunningham	6 ft 10 in (2.08 m)	245 lb (111 kg)	1946–07–11	Murray State
C	15	Wayne Embry	6 ft 8 in (2.03 m)	240 lb (109 kg)	1937–03–26	Miami (OH)
G	14	Jon McGlocklin	6 ft 5 in (1.96 m)	205 lb (93 kg)	1943–06–10	Indiana
C	27	Rich Niemann	7 ft 0 in (2.13 m)	245 lb (111 kg)	1946–07–02	Saint Louis
G	21	Flynn Robinson	6 ft 1 in (1.85 m)	185 lb (84 kg)	1941–04–28	Wyoming
G	5	Guy Rodgers	6 ft 0 in (1.83 m)	185 lb (84 kg)	1935–09–31	Temple
F	16	Don Smith	6 ft 9 in (2.06 m)	235 lb (107 kg)	1946–04–07	Iowa State
F	4	Greg Smith	6 ft 5 in (1.96 m)	195 lb (88 kg)	1947–01–28	Western Kentucky
G	3	Sam Williams	6 ft 3 in (1.91 m)	180 lb (82 kg)	1945–01–22	Iowa

Coaches
Head coach
- Larry Costello
Assistant(s)
- Tom Nissalke

Legend
- (DP) Unsigned draft pick
- (FA) Free agent
- (S) Suspended
- Injured

Roster
Updated: January 31, 1969

== Regular season ==
=== Season standings ===
Eastern Division	W	L	PCT	GB	Home	Road	Neutral	Div
x-Baltimore Bullets	57	25	.695	–	29–9	24–15	4–1	26–14
x-Philadelphia 76ers	55	27	.671	2	26–8	24–16	5–3	23–17
x-New York Knicks	54	28	.659	3	30–7	19–20	5–1	26–14
x-Boston Celtics	48	34	.585	9	24–12	21–19	3–3	23–17
Cincinnati Royals	41	41	.500	16	15-13	16–21	10–7	20–20
Detroit Pistons	32	50	.390	25	21–17	7–30	4–3	13–27
Milwaukee Bucks	27	55	.329	30	15–19	8–27	4–9	7–29

x – clinched playoff spot

=== Game log ===
1968–69 game log
Total: 27–55 (home: 15–19; road: 8–27; neutral: 4–9)
October: 1–5 (home: 1–3; road: 0–2)

Game	Date	Team	Score	High points	High rebounds	High assists	Location Attendance	Record
1	October 16, 1968	Chicago	L 84–89	Guy Rodgers (16)	Wayne Embry (20)	Guy Rodgers (9)	Milwaukee Arena	0–1
2	October 19, 1968	@ Atlanta	L 107–125	Guy Rodgers (25)	Wayne Embry, Len Chappell, Dick Cunningham (6)	Guy Rodgers (11)	Alexander Memorial Coliseum	0–2
3	October 23, 1968	New York	L 112–114	Wayne Embry (26)	Wayne Embry (17)	Guy Rodgers (13)	Milwaukee Arena	0–3
4	October 26, 1968	@ Boston	L 89–102	Wayne Embry (20)	Bob Love (9)		Boston Garden	0–4
5	October 29, 1968	Baltimore	L 112–129	Fred Hetzel, Jon McGlocklin (21)	Charlie Paulk (10)	Guy Rodgers (11)	Milwaukee Arena	0–5
6	October 31, 1968	Detroit	W 134–118	Wayne Embry (30)			Milwaukee Arena	1–5

November: 5–10 (home: 4–3; road: 1–7)

Game	Date	Team	Score	High points	High rebounds	High assists	Location Attendance	Record
7	November 1, 1968	@ Cincinnati	L 114–132	Dave Gambee (21)	Fred Hetzel (13)	Guy Rodgers (7)	Cincinnati Gardens	1–6
8	November 2, 1968	San Francisco	W 102–101	Dave Gambee (20)	Wayne Embry (15)	Guy Rodgers (11)	Milwaukee Arena	2–6
9	November 6, 1968	N Los Angeles	L 115-128	Wayne Embry (30)			Veterans Memorial Coliseum	2–7
10	November 9, 1968	Boston	L 97-98	Wayne Embry, Fred Hetzel (16)			Milwaukee Arena	2–8
11	November 12, 1968	Seattle	W 127-114	Dave Gambee (29)	Wayne Embry (13)	Guy Rodgers (16)	Milwaukee Arena	3–8
12	November 15, 1968	@ Baltimore	L 102–129	Wayne Embry (24)	Wayne Embry, Fred Hetzel (13)	Guy Rodgers (12)	Baltimore Civic Center	3–9
13	November 16, 1968	@ Philadelphia	L 92-136	Jon McGlocklin (19)	Fred Hetzel (14)	Guy Rodgers (8)	The Spectrum	3–10
14	November 19, 1968	Atlanta	W 119-98	Guy Rodgers (26)	Fred Hetzel (13)	Guy Rodgers (10)	Milwaukee Arena	4–10
15	November 21, 1968	@ Chicago	L 111-120	Guy Rodgers (29)	Wayne Embry (19)	Jon McGlocklin (6)	Chicago Stadium	4–11
16	November 23, 1968	Phoenix	W 115-112	Fred Hetzel (28)	Fred Hetzel, Wayne Embry (18)	Guy Rodgers (11)	Milwaukee Arena	5–11
17	November 24, 1968	@ Seattle	L 120-141	Wayne Embry (29)	Wayne Embry (12)	Guy Rodgers (6)	Seattle Center Coliseum	5–12
18	November 25, 1968	Seattle	L 113-123	Jon McGlocklin (25)	Fred Hetzel, Wayne Embry, Greg Smith (9)	Jon McGlocklin (6)	Milwaukee Arena	5–13
19	November 28, 1968	@ Seattle	L 103-115	Wayne Embry (27)	Wayne Embry (14)	Guy Rodgers (13)	Seattle Center Coliseum	5–14
20	November 29, 1968	@ San Francisco	W 119-140	Fred Hetzel (29)	Fred Hetzel (10)	Guy Rodgers (9)	Cow Palace	5–15
21	November 30, 1968	@ San Francisco	W 107–101	Fred Hetzel (22)	Wayne Embry, Fred Hetzel (11)	Guy Rodgers (9)	Oakland-Alameda County Coliseum Arena	6–15

December: 4–15 (home: 4–7; road: 0–8)

Game	Date	Team	Score	High points	High rebounds	High assists	Location Attendance	Record
22	December 1, 1968	@ Los Angeles	L 112-119	Fred Hetzel (25)	Wayne Embry (20)	Guy Rodgers (10)	The Forum	6–16
23	December 3, 1968	Boston	L 115-137	Wayne Embry (29)			Milwaukee Arena	6–17
24	December 4, 1968	@ Boston	L 99-101	Jon McGlocklin (20)	Len Chappell (13)	Guy Rodgers (9)	Boston Garden	6–18
25	December 6, 1968	Philadelphia	L 112-121	Guy Rodgers (24)	Dave Gambee (12)	Jon McGlocklin (6)	Milwaukee Arena	6–19
26	December 7, 1968	@ New York	L 113-119	Jon McGlocklin (24)	Jon McGlocklin (9)	Jon McGlocklin (9)	Madison Square Garden	6-20
27	December 8, 1968	N Philadelphia	L 117-122	Len Chappell (28)	Len Chappell (13)	Guy Rodgers (10)	Onondaga War Memorial	6-21
28	December 10, 1968	Cincinnati	L 96-107	Jon McGlocklin (20)	Greg Smith (15)		Milwaukee Arena	6-22
29	December 11, 1968	N San Francisco	W 106-96	Flynn Robinson (24)	Greg Smith (19)	Guy Rodgers (7)	Veterans Memorial Coliseum	7-22
30	December 13, 1968	San Diego	W 101-96	Guy Rodgers (20)	Greg Smith (13)	Guy Rodgers (8)	Milwaukee Arena	8-22
31	December 14, 1968	@ Cincinnati	L 115-121	Wayne Embry (23)	Greg Smith (15)		Cincinnati Gardens	8-23
32	December 18, 1968	@ Atlanta	L 116-122	Len Chappell, Jon McGlocklin (23)	Len Chappell, Greg Smith (10)	Guy Rodgers (5)	Alexander Memorial Coliseum	8-24
33	December 19, 1968	@ Chicago	L 111-113	Len Chappell (35)	Len Chappell (16)	Jon McGlocklin, Wayne Embry, Flynn Robinson, Fred Hetzel (2)	Chicago Stadium	8-25
34	December 20, 1968	Seattle	W 100-92	Flynn Robinson (28)	Greg Smith (16)	Guy Rodgers (7)	Milwaukee Arena	9-25
35	December 22, 1968	Phoenix	W 127-116	Fred Hetzel (31)	Fred Hetzel (14)	Flynn Robinson (11)	Milwaukee Arena	10–25
36	December 25, 1968	Detroit	L 113-119	Guy Rodgers (24)			Milwaukee Arena	10–26
37	December 26, 1968	@ Boston	L 106-139	Jon McGlocklin, Flynn Robinson (17)	Fred Hetzel (13)	Flynn Robinson, Guy Rodgers (3)	Boston Garden	10–27
38	December 27, 1968	@ Baltimore	L 122-136	Fred Hetzel, Flynn Robinson (25)	Fred Hetzel (8)	Guy Rodgers (8)	Baltimore Civic Center	10–28
39	December 29, 1968	Chicago Bulls	L 97-102	Jon McGlocklin (24)	Len Chappell (16)	Guy Rodgers (6)	Milwaukee Arena	10–29
40	December 31, 1968	Philadelphia	L 107-128	Len Chappell (22)	Greg Smith (15)	Flynn Robinson, Guy Rodgers (6)	Milwaukee Arena	10–30

January: 5–9 (home: 4–6; road: 1–3)

Game	Date	Team	Score	High points	High rebounds	High assists	Location Attendance	Record
41	January 2, 1969	N Cincinnati	L 109-113	Jon McGlocklin (26)	Greg Smith (20)		Veterans Memorial Coliseum	10–31
42	January 3, 1969	Phoenix	W 121-104	Len Chappell (33)	Greg Smith (22)	Guy Rodgers (12)	Milwaukee Arena	11–31
43	January 7, 1969	@ Cincinnati	W 116-101	Len Chappell (30)	Fred Hetzel (13)		Cincinnati Gardens	12–31
44	January 8, 1969	New York	L 101-115	Jon McGlocklin (23)	Fred Hetzel, Wayne Embry (12)	Guy Rodgers (4)	Milwaukee Arena	12–32
45	January 10, 1969	Seattle	W 115-104	Jon McGlocklin, Flynn Robinson (24)	Greg Smith (23)	Guy Rodgers (6)	Milwaukee Arena	13–32
46	January 12, 1969	Boston	W 114-110	Flynn Robinson (26)			Milwaukee Arena	14–32
47	January 17, 1969	@ Detroit	L 108-123	Flynn Robinson (23)			Cobo Arena	14–33
48	January 18, 1969	N New York	L 109-117	Flynn Robinson (22)	Greg Smith (15)	Guy Rodgers (8)	Boston Garden	14–34
49	January 20, 1969	N Detroit	W 102-101	Jon McGlocklin (38)			Veterans Memorial Coliseum	15–34
50	January 21, 1969	Los Angeles	L 105-122	Jon McGlocklin (33)			Milwaukee Arena	15–35
51	January 25, 1969	@ New York	L 96-113	Jon McGlocklin (26)	Jon McGlocklin, Greg Smith (10)	Flynn Robinson (9)	Madison Square Garden	15–36
52	January 27, 1969	N Seattle	L 107-128	Wayne Embry, Fred Hetzel (20)	Len Chappell (12)	Jon McGlocklin (7)	Tacoma, WA	15–37
53	January 29, 1969	N Phoenix	L 107-111	Len Chappell, Fred Hetzel (27)	Len Chappell (11)	Jon McGlocklin (10)	Tucson, Arizona	15–38
54	January 31, 1969	@ Los Angeles	L 104-105	Flynn Robinson (43)	Greg Smith (15)	Flynn Robinson (8)	The Forum	15–39

February: 8–7 (home: 6–4; road: 2–3)

Game	Date	Team	Score	High points	High rebounds	High assists	Location Attendance	Record
55	February 1, 1969	@ San Diego	L 95-101	Flynn Robinson (22)	Zaid Abdul-Aziz (23)	Guy Rodgers (6)	San Diego Sports Arena	15–40
56	February 2, 1969	@ Phoenix	L 121-122	Len Chappell (32)	Len Chappell (16)	Flynn Robinson (7)	Arizona Veterans Memorial Coliseum	15–41
57	February 4, 1969	@ Chicago	W 107-98	Flynn Robinson (22)	Len Chappell (12)	Guy Rodgers (8)	Chicago Stadium	16–41
58	February 5, 1969	New York	L 102-111	Flynn Robinson (35)	Zaid Abdul-Aziz (14)	Flynn Robinson (8)	Milwaukee Arena	16–42
59	February 7, 1969	Baltimore	L 107-114	Jon McGlocklin (22)	Zaid Abdul-Aziz (23)	Jon McGlocklin (8)	Milwaukee Arena	16–43
60	February 9, 1969	San Diego	W 117-109	Len Chappell (23)	Len Chappell (15)	Flynn Robinson (10)	Milwaukee Arena	17–43
61	February 12, 1969	Atlanta	L 106-113	Len Chappell (26)	Greg Smith (18)	Flynn Robinson, Dick Cunningham (9)	Milwaukee Arena	17–44
62	February 14, 1969	@ Baltimore	L 122-132	Jon McGlocklin (37)	Dick Cunningham (17)	Flynn Robinson (8)	Baltimore Civic Center	17–45
63	February 16, 1969	Los Angeles	W 106-97	Flynn Robinson (41)	Greg Smith (16)	Flynn Robinson, Guy Rodgers (6)	Milwaukee Arena	18–45
64	February 17, 1969	N Atlanta	W 123-111	Flynn Robinson (43)			Baltimore Civic Center	19–45
65	February 22, 1969	@ Detroit	W 108-107	Flynn Robinson (45)			Cobo Arena	20–45
66	February 23, 1969	N Phoenix	L 107-103	Len Chappell (24)	Zaid Abdul-Aziz (18)	Guy Rodgers (9)	Brown County Veterans Memorial Arena	21–45
67	February 25, 1969	San Diego	W 114-112	Len Chappell (26)	Greg Smith (15)	Guy Rodgers (13)	Milwaukee Arena	22–45
68	February 27, 1969	Baltimore	W 126-117	Flynn Robinson (35)	Greg Smith (21)	Flynn Robinson (9)	Milwaukee Arena	23–45
69	February 28, 1969	N Philadelphia	L 102-123	Jon McGlocklin (27)	Greg Smith (10)	Greg Smith (5)	Boston Garden	23–46

March: 4–9 (home: 0–5; road: 4–4)

Game	Date	Team	Score	High points	High rebounds	High assists	Location Attendance	Record
70	March 2, 1969	@ Atlanta	L 108-112	Flynn Robinson (28)	Zaid Abdul-Aziz (13)	Flynn Robinson (6)	Alexander Memorial Coliseum	23–47
71	March 3, 1969	Philadelphia	L 132-143	Flynn Robinson (34)	Greg Smith (18)	Flynn Robinson (10)	Milwaukee Arena	23–48
72	March 5, 1969	Chicago	L 108-124	Jon McGlocklin (38)	Len Chappell (13)	Jon McGlocklin, Flynn Robinson (5)	Milwaukee Arena	23–49
73	March 6, 1969	Cincinnati	L 110-112	Flynn Robinson (39)	Zaid Abdul-Aziz (17)		Milwaukee Arena	23–50
74	March 9, 1969	@ Detroit	W 126-121	Jon McGlocklin, Flynn Robinson (21)	Zaid Abdul-Aziz (16)	Jon McGlocklin (8)	Cobo Arena	24–50
75	March 10, 1969	San Francisco	L 106-123	Jon McGlocklin (31)	Zaid Abdul-Aziz (16)	Jon McGlocklin (8)	Milwaukee Arena	24–51
76	March 13, 1969	N Seattle	L 118-141	Flynn Robinson (27)	Zaid Abdul-Aziz (11)	Guy Rodgers (9)	Brown County Veterans Memorial Arena	24–52
77	March 14, 1969	@ Los Angeles	L 103-111	Jon McGlocklin (32)	Greg Smith (12)	Flynn Robinson (7)	The Forum	24–53
78	March 18, 1969	@ San Diego	L 108-128	Jon McGlocklin, Flynn Robinson (25)	Zaid Abdul-Aziz (12)	Flynn Robinson (6)	San Diego Sports Arena	24–54
79	March 19, 1969	@ Phoenix	W 117-110	Jon McGlocklin (26)	Zaid Abdul-Aziz (16)	Jon McGlocklin, Flynn Robinson (8)	Arizona Veterans Memorial Coliseum	25–54
80	March 21, 1969	@ San Francisco	L 100-103	Flynn Robinson (20)	Zaid Abdul-Aziz (23)	Flynn Robinson (7)	Oakland-Alameda County Coliseum Arena	25–55
81	March 22, 1969	@ San Diego	W 120-106	Flynn Robinson (28)	Zaid Abdul-Aziz (17)	Guy Rodgers (9)	San Diego Sports Arena	26–55
82	March 23, 1969	@ Phoenix	W 128-118	Flynn Robinson (33)	Zaid Abdul-Aziz (19)	Jon McGlocklin (9)	Arizona Veterans Memorial Coliseum	27–55

1968–69 schedule

== Player statistics ==
Legend
GP	Games played	GS	Games started	MPG	Minutes per game
FG%	Field-goal percentage	3P%	3-point field-goal percentage	FT%	Free-throw percentage
RPG	Rebounds per game	APG	Assists per game	SPG	Steals per game
BPG	Blocks per game	PPG	Points per game

Player	GP	MPG	FG%	FT%	RPG	APG	PPG
Zaid Abdul-Aziz	29	28.9	.363	.642	13.0	1.1	11.0
Len Chappell	80	27.6	.454	.737	8.0	1.2	14.6
Dick Cunningham	77	16.1	.425	.651	5.7	0.8	4.6
Wayne Embry	78	30.2	.427	.664	8.6	1.9	13.1
Dave Gambee	34	18.4	.464	.827	5.3	0.9	12.1
Fred Hetzel	53	30.0	.416	.837	8.9	1.6	15.9
Bob Love	14	16.2	.368	.763	4.6	0.2	7.9
Jon McGlocklin	80	36.1	.487	.842	4.3	3.9	19.6
Jay Miller	3	9.0	.200	.714	0.7	0.0	3.0
Rich Niemann	18	8.3	.407	.733	3.3	0.4	3.3
Charlie Paulk	17	12.8	.226	.565	4.6	0.2	3.0
Flynn Robinson	65	31.8	.436	.841	3.6	4.9	20.3
Guy Rodgers	81	26.6	.377	.793	2.8	6.9	10.3
Greg Smith	79	27.9	.450	.587	10.2	1.7	8.1
Bob Warlick	3	7.3	.125	.800	0.3	0.3	2.0
Bob Weiss	15	16.1	.316	.794	1.8	1. 8	6.6
Sam Williams	55	11.4	.342	.537	2.0	1.1	4.1

== Transactions ==
=== Trades ===
November 23, 1968
To Milwaukee Bucks----
- Flynn Robinson
To Chicago Bulls----
- Bob Love
- Bob Weiss
January 1, 1969
To Milwaukee Bucks----
- Rich Niemann
To Detroit Pistons----
- Dave Gambee
January 31, 1969
To Milwaukee Bucks----
- Zaid Abdul-Aziz
To Cincinnati Royals----
- Fred Hetzel
