= Greg Smith (basketball, born 1947) =

American basketball player (born 1947)

Personal information
- Born: June 28, 1947 (age 79) Princeton, Kentucky, U.S.
- Listed height: 6 ft 5 in (1.96 m)
- Listed weight: 195 lb (88 kg)

Career information
- High school: Caldwell County (Caldwell, Kentucky)
- College: Western Kentucky (1965–1968)
- NBA draft: 1968: 4th round, 50th overall pick
- Drafted by: Milwaukee Bucks
- Playing career: 1968–1975
- Position: Power forward / small forward
- Number: 4

Career history
- 1968–1971: Milwaukee Bucks
- 1971–1972: Houston Rockets
- 1972–1975: Portland Trail Blazers

Career highlights
- NBA champion (1971)

Career statistics
- Points: 4,097 (7.8 ppg)
- Rebounds: 3,249 (6.2 rpg)
- Assists: 969 (1.8 apg)
- Stats at NBA.com
- Stats at Basketball Reference

Gregory Darnell Smith (born January 28, 1947) is an American former basketball player. He was a starter on the 1970–71 Milwaukee Bucks National Basketball Association (NBA) championship team.

== Early life ==
Smith was born on January 28, 1947, in Princeton, Kentucky, the son of Henry and Pearl (Hill) Smith. He attended Dotson High School in Caldwell County, Kentucky, which later merged with Caldwell County High School. Smith played on Dotson's basketball team with his older brother Dwight. He graduated from Caldwell County High in 1964. His Dotson teams won district titles in the 1961–62 and 1962–63 seasons, and he was named to the district All-Tournament teams. Greg and Dwight twice led their Dotson team to the Kentucky state basketball tournament. Smith was named to the Second Region All-Tournament Team in 1962–63.

As a senior (1963–64) at Caldwell County High, the team's won–loss record was 24–7. Smith averaged 16.1 points per game, and established its single game rebounding record with 37 (21 offensive). He was again named to the district All-Tournament Team; with Caldwell winning the district title. In 1964, he was again named to the Second Region All-Tournament Team, and was named that tournament's Most Valuable Player. Caldwell reached the quarterfinals of the Kentucky State High School Championship Tournament, with Smith making the All-State Tournament Team as well.

He is the only Caldwell County High player to have his jersey number retired.

== College ==
Smith followed his brother Dwight to attend Western Kentucky University on a basketball scholarship, where he majored in physical education and social work. He played college basketball for the Western Kentucky Hilltoppers. As a sophomore (1965–66), Smith averaged 9.5 points and 10.3 rebounds per game (8th best in the conference). The Hilltoppers were the 1966 Ohio Valley Conference champions.

The team had a 25–3 record and ranked 10th in the final Associated Press (AP) college basketball poll among men's Division I teams. His teammates included his older brother Dwight (16.1 points and 9.9 rebounds per game) and future NBA player Clem Haskins (20.4 points and 10 rebounds per game). Western Kentucky won in the first round of the 1966 NCAA Men's Division I basketball tournament, but lost the next game by one point (80–79) to the University of Michigan in the regional semifinals. Smith had nine points and 13 rebounds as a sophomore starter against Michigan.

As a junior, he averaged 11.8 points and 10.9 rebounds per game. The 1966–67 team was 23–3 and again won the Ohio Valley Conference championship, and they were ranked 6th in the final AP poll. The University of Dayton eliminated the Hilltoppers 69–67 in overtime in the first round of the 1967 NCAA tournament. He, Haskins and Dwight Smith all averaged over 10 rebounds per game, with Greg Smith the 10th highest in the conference. As a senior, Smith averaged 13 points and 14.5 rebounds per game, but without Haskins and Dwight Smith, the 1967–68 Hilltoppers finished third in the Ohio Valley Conference in 1968. Smith had the third highest rebounding average in the Ohio Valley Conference in 1968.

== Professional basketball ==
He was selected by the Kentucky Colonels in the American Basketball Association's 1968 draft, and by the Milwaukee Bucks in the fourth round of the 1968 NBA draft (50th overall). Smith played forward for the Milwaukee Bucks (1968–71), Houston Rockets (1971–72) and Portland Trail Blazers (1972–75).

=== Milwaukee Bucks ===
Smith was a rookie on the expansion Milwaukee Buck's first team in 1968–69. He played nearly 28 minutes per game, averaging 8.1 points and 10.2 rebounds per game. The team had a 27–55 record under rookie head coach Larry Costello. The Bucks fortunes changed dramatically the following season after they drafted future Hall of Fame center, and one of the NBA's 75 greatest players ever, Kareem Abdul-Jabbar (then generally known as Lew Alcindor) with the overall first pick in the 1969 NBA draft, and future NBA Hall of Fame forward Bob Dandridge with their fourth-round pick.

The 1969–70 Bucks improved by 29 games, with a regular season record of 56–26, finishing second in the Eastern division. They reached the Eastern Division Finals losing to the New York Knicks who would go on to win the 1970 NBA championship. Smith started at power forward, averaging 9.8 points and 8.7 rebounds in nearly 29 minutes per game. He averaged a double-double (11.6 points, 10.6 rebounds) in the first round of the playoffs against the Philadelphia 76ers, and 9.8 points and 6.4 rebounds in the Knicks series.

Smith helped the 66–16 Bucks win the 1970–71 NBA Championship. In the 1970–71 season, Smith averaged 11.7 points, 7.2 rebounds and 2.8 assists per game. He averaged a double-double (11 points, 11.2 rebounds) in the first round playoff victory over the San Francisco Warriors, 13.2 points, 6.2 rebounds and 3.2 assists in the five-game Western division finals win over the Los Angeles Lakers, and 10 points and 8.3 rebounds per game in the NBA finals win over the Baltimore Bullets.

Smith played only 28 games for the 1971–72 Bucks team that finished with a 63–19 record, winning the NBA Midwest Division. That team reached the Western division finals, losing to the Los Angeles Lakers two games to four. In early December 1971, the Bucks traded Smith and their third draft pick in the 1973 draft to the Houston Rockets for Curtis Perry and the Rockets first draft pick in the 1972 draft.

The Bucks made the trade in the belief that they would be able to draft a talented and extremely valuable college player with the additional No. 1 draft pick. The Bucks used that pick (No. 6) to draft Russ Lee, however, who played only two years for the Bucks and never averaged more than six minutes a game. Perry finished out the 1971–72 season with the Bucks averaging seven points and 9.4 rebounds per game. He played two more years for the Bucks, averaging 9.1 points and 9.6 rebounds in 1972–73 and nine points and 8.7 rebounds in 1973–74.

Abdul-Jabbar considered Smith the key to the Bucks' championship team, and his absence from the team was one of the reasons they did not win another championship. Although only 6 ft, 5 in (1.96 m), small for a power forward, Smith could rebound well against much taller players and was as fast as any guard, making him a unique player to compete against. Abdul-Jabbar said that forwards like Gus Johnson and Dave DeBusschere (both later in the Hall of Fame) hated playing against Smith. Bucks teammate Oscar Robertson (another Hall of Famer and member of the 75th anniversary team) considered Smith the toughest defender he played against, when Robertson was on the Cincinnati Royals.

=== Houston Rockets and Portland Trail Blazers ===
Smith went from a first-place team in Milwaukee, to a Rockets team that finished 34–48 in the 1971–72 season. Smith averaged 2.9 assists per game with the Rockets, a career-high for any one team in a season, and 9.1 points; but only six rebounds per game. The Rockets traded him early the next season to the Portland Trail Blazers for Stan McKenzie, on October 27, 1972. He had been averaging just 10 minutes per game with the Rockets, and after the trade played about 22 minutes per game with the Trail Blazers to finish the 1972–73 season. Smith played the next two seasons as a reserve with the Trail Blazers, averaging 13.1 and 9.4 minutes per game respectively. Smith played only one game the following season before the Trail Blazers waived him in early November 1975, to activate rookie Lionel Hollins.

=== Career ===
In 8 seasons Smith played in 524 games and had 12,269 minutes played. He had a .482 field goal percentage (1,737 for 3,607), and a .646 free throw percentage (623 for 965). He recorded 3,249 total rebounds, 969 assists, 1,553 personal fouls and 4,097 points.

== Personal life ==
In 1967, Smith's brother Dwight and sister Kay were killed in an automobile accident on a rainy night while driving with Smith, who survived in the submerged vehicle because he was in an air pocket. Dwight had been selected by the Los Angeles Lakers in the third round of the 1967 NBA draft. He had averaged 14.6 points and 11 rebounds per game over his three-year career at Western Kentucky. He was posthumously selected to Western Kentucky's Hall of Fame (1995), the Kentucky High School Basketball Hall of Fame (2016), the Ohio Valley Conference's 40th (1988) and 75th anniversary teams (2023), and Western Kentucky's All-Century basketball team (2018). Western Kentucky retired Dwight Smith's jersey number in 2023.

After retiring, Smith sold advertising for KGW radio in Portland, and also worked for Portland's exposition recreation commission. He chaired the Oregon Black Republican Council from 1984 to 1988. Smith played Amateur Athletic Union (AAU) basketball after retiring, and formed a Trail Blazers alumni team with some other retired players. For over two decades, the alumni team traveled around Oregon and parts of Washington, raising over $2 million for various non-profit organizations.

Smith and his wife Linda have five children. His son Keith Smith was the 1985–86 Oregon high school basketball player of the year, and went on to play point guard on the University of California's basketball team (1986–90). He also played for the Albany Patroons in the Continental Basketball Association. He has a younger son, Damien Dwight Smith. Damien was an athletic standout at Portland's Wilson High School, excelling in basketball, football and track, despite two knee surgeries.

== Honors ==
Smith was inducted into the Kentucky High School Hall of Fame in 1997, and the Western Kentucky's Athletics Hall of Fame in 1998. He was inducted into the Kentucky High School Basketball Hall of Fame in 2023, with him and Dwight being the only brothers in this hall of fame.

== NBA career statistics ==
Legend
GP	Games played	GS	Games started	MPG	Minutes per game
FG%	Field goal percentage	3P%	3-point field goal percentage	FT%	Free throw percentage
RPG	Rebounds per game	APG	Assists per game	SPG	Steals per game
BPG	Blocks per game	PPG	Points per game	**Bold**	Career high
†	Won an NBA championship	*	Led the league

=== Regular season ===
Year	Team	GP	GS	MPG	FG%	3P%	FT%	RPG	APG	SPG	BPG	PPG
1968–69	Milwaukee	79	–	27.9	.450	–	.587	**10.2**	1.7	–	–	8.1
1969–70	Milwaukee	**82***	–	28.9	.511	–	**.718**	8.7	1.9	–	–	9.8
1970–71†	Milwaukee	**82**	–	**29.6**	**.512**	–	.662	7.2	2.8	–	–	**11.7**
1971–72	Milwaukee	28	–	26.3	.490	–	.707	5.8	2.3	–	–	8.4
1971–72	Houston	54	–	28.1	.448	–	.636	6.0	**2.9**	–	–	9.1
1972–73	Houston	4	–	10.3	.313	–	.000	2.0	1.3	–	–	2.5
1972–73	Portland	72	–	21.8	.488	–	.586	5.2	1.6	–	–	7.4
1973–74	Portland	67	–	13.1	.434	–	.608	2.8	1.2	**0.6**	**0.1**	3.7
1974–75	Portland	55	–	9.4	.486	–	.667	1.6	0.5	0.4	**0.1**	3.2
1975–76	Portland	1	–	3.0	.000	–	.000	0.0	0.0	0.0	0.0	0.0
Career		524	–	23.4	.482	–	.646	6.2	1.8	0.5	0.1	7.8

=== Playoffs ===
Year	Team	GP	GS	MPG	FG%	3P%	FT%	RPG	APG	SPG	BPG	PPG
1969–70	Milwaukee	10	–	**32.9**	.500	–	**.591**	8.5	2.2	–	–	10.7
1970–71†	Milwaukee	**14**	–	32.4	**.547**	–	.550	**8.6**	**2.6**	–	–	**11.6**
Career		24	–	32.6	.527	–	.565	8.5	2.4	–	–	11.2
