= 1968–69 New York Knicks season =

Season of National Basketball Association team the New York Knicks

- Head coach: Red Holzman
- General manager: Eddie Donovan
- Arena: Madison Square Garden

Results
- Record: 54–28 (.659)
- Place: Division: 3rd (Eastern)
- Playoff finish: East Division finals (lost to Celtics 2–4)
- Stats at Basketball Reference

Local media
- Television: WOR-TV
- Radio: WHN

The 1968–69 New York Knicks season was the 23rd season for the team in the National Basketball Association (NBA). The Knicks finished third in the Eastern Division with a 54–28 regular season record, and qualified for the NBA playoffs for the third straight year. In the first round of the playoffs, New York defeated the Baltimore Bullets in a four-game sweep to earn a berth in the Eastern Division finals. The Knicks lost the division finals to the eventual NBA champion Boston Celtics in six games. Willis Reed scored a team-best 21.1 points per game for the Knicks; Walt Frazier led the team with 7.9 assists per game and Reed averaged 14.5 rebounds per game.

The Knicks selected Bill Hosket, Jr. in the opening round of the 1968 NBA draft, and made a significant trade early in the season, acquiring Dave DeBusschere from the Detroit Pistons in exchange for Walt Bellamy and Butch Komives. Author Harvey Araton called him "the player who would complete the championship puzzle in New York." After a 5–11 start to the season, New York went on a long winning streak, winning all but 2 of 19 games in one stretch that included 13 straight home wins. After a two-game losing streak, the Knicks won 11 consecutive games from January 25 to February 15 to bring their record to 44–21. The Knicks had two four-game winning streaks during the rest of the season, and ended with a 54–28 record. This mark placed them third in the Eastern Conference; only the Bullets and Philadelphia 76ers had superior records. New York saw an increase in attendance during the regular season; after having six sellouts in their entire history, the Knicks played to capacity crowds in 14 games at Madison Square Garden.

New York faced the Bullets, who had won 57 games in the regular season and held the number one seed in the Eastern Conference, in their first playoff round. The Knicks won the first two games by over 10 points each, and a pair of closer victories in games three and four eliminated Baltimore. They held home court advantage for their series with the Celtics, but lost it with a 108–100 loss in the first game. After losing two of the next three games, New York won game five to force a sixth game. However, Boston's Sam Jones posted 29 points to help the Celtics to a 106–105 win that ended the Knicks' season.

== NBA draft ==
Note: This is not an extensive list; it only covers the first and second rounds, and any other players picked by the franchise that played at least one game in the league.

| Round | Pick | Player | Position | Nationality | School/Club team |
|---|---|---|---|---|---|
| 1 | 10 | Bill Hosket | F/C | United States | Ohio State |
| 3 | 30 | Don May | F/C | United States | Dayton |
| 17 | 202 | Milt Williams | G | United States | Lincoln (MO) |

== Roster ==
1968–69 New York Knicks roster
Players

| Pos. | No. | Player | Height | Weight | DOB | From |
|---|---|---|---|---|---|---|
| SG | 12 | Dick Barnett | 6 ft 4 in (1.93 m) | 190 lb (86 kg) | 1936–10–02 | Tennessee State |
| C | 17 | Nate Bowman | 6 ft 10 in (2.08 m) | 230 lb (104 kg) | 1945–03–19 | Wichita State |
| SF | 24 | Bill Bradley | 6 ft 5 in (1.96 m) | 205 lb (93 kg) | 1943–07–28 | Princeton |
| PF | 22 | Dave DeBusschere | 6 ft 6 in (1.98 m) | 220 lb (100 kg) | 1940–10–16 | Detroit Mercy |
| PG | 10 | Walt Frazier | 6 ft 4 in (1.93 m) | 200 lb (91 kg) | 1945–03–29 | Southern Illinois |
| PF | 20 | Bill, Jr. Hosket | 6 ft 8 in (2.03 m) | 225 lb (102 kg) | 1946–12–20 | Ohio State |
| PF | 18 | Phil Jackson | 6 ft 8 in (2.03 m) | 220 lb (100 kg) | 1945-09-17 | North Dakota |
| SF | 5 | Don May | 6 ft 4 in (1.93 m) | 200 lb (91 kg) | 1946–01–03 | Dayton |
| C | 19 | Willis Reed | 6 ft 9 in (2.06 m) | 235 lb (107 kg) | 1942–06–25 | Grambling State |
| SG | 6 | Mike Riordan | 6 ft 4 in (1.93 m) | 200 lb (91 kg) | 1945–07–09 | Providence |
| SF | 33 | Cazzie Russell | 6 ft 5 in (1.96 m) | 218 lb (99 kg) | 1944–06–07 | Michigan |
| SF | 9 | Dave Stallworth | 6 ft 7 in (2.01 m) | 200 lb (91 kg) | 1941–12–20 | Wichita State |

Coaches
Head coach
- Red Holzman

Legend
- (DP) Unsigned draft pick
- (FA) Free agent
- (S) Suspended
- Injured

== Regular season ==
=== Season standings ===
| Eastern Division | W | L | PCT | GB | Home | Road | Neutral | Div |
|---|---|---|---|---|---|---|---|---|
| x-Baltimore Bullets | 57 | 25 | .695 | – | 29–9 | 24–15 | 4–1 | 26–14 |
| x-Philadelphia 76ers | 55 | 27 | .671 | 2 | 26–8 | 24–16 | 5–3 | 23–17 |
| x-New York Knicks | 54 | 28 | .659 | 3 | 30–7 | 19–20 | 5–1 | 26–14 |
| x-Boston Celtics | 48 | 34 | .585 | 9 | 24–12 | 21–19 | 3–3 | 23–17 |
| Cincinnati Royals | 41 | 41 | .500 | 16 | 15-13 | 16–21 | 10–7 | 20–20 |
| Detroit Pistons | 32 | 50 | .390 | 25 | 21–17 | 7–30 | 4–3 | 13–27 |
| Milwaukee Bucks | 27 | 55 | .329 | 30 | 15–19 | 8–27 | 4–9 | 7–29 |

x – clinched playoff spot

=== Game log ===
1968–69 game log
| # | Date | Opponent | Score | High points | Record |
| 1 | October 15 | Chicago | 100–96 | Cazzie Russell (29) | 0–1 |
| 2 | October 19 | Los Angeles | 118–96 | Walt Bellamy (22) | 0–2 |
| 3 | October 22 | Philadelphia | 114–117 | Cazzie Russell (27) | 1–2 |
| 4 | October 23 | @ Milwaukee | 114–112 | Willis Reed (23) | 2–2 |
| 5 | October 24 | @ Phoenix | 92–109 | Willis Reed (24) | 2–3 |
| 6 | October 26 | Cincinnati | 92–98 | Cazzie Russell (26) | 3–3 |
| 7 | October 29 | San Francisco | 97–110 | Cazzie Russell (24) | 4–3 |
| 8 | October 30 | @ Cincinnati | 114–118 | Willis Reed (21) | 4–4 |
| 9 | November 1 | Baltimore | 119–103 | Howard Komives (24) | 4–5 |
| 10 | November 2 | @ Detroit | 104–112 | Willis Reed (34) | 4–6 |
| 11 | November 3 | @ Seattle | 122–108 | Cazzie Russell (35) | 5–6 |
| 12 | November 5 | @ San Diego | 109–113 | Cazzie Russell (26) | 5–7 |
| 13 | November 6 | @ San Francisco | 93–94 | Cazzie Russell (18) | 5–8 |
| 14 | November 8 | @ Los Angeles | 100–102 | Barnett, Reed (22) | 5–9 |
| 15 | November 10 | @ Los Angeles | 109–130 | Dick Barnett (26) | 5–10 |
| 16 | November 14 | Cincinnati | 110–101 | Cazzie Russell (28) | 5–11 |
| 17 | November 16 | Chicago | 97–119 | Cazzie Russell (24) | 6–11 |
| 18 | November 19 | San Diego | 113–107 | Dick Barnett (22) | 6–12 |
| 19 | November 20 | @ Atlanta | 106–111 | Dick Barnett (26) | 6–13 |
| 20 | November 22 | N Chicago | 114–107 | Cazzie Russell (23) | 7–13 |
| 21 | November 23 | Boston | 100–111 | Walt Bellamy (29) | 8–13 |
| 22 | November 26 | Los Angeles | 100–104 | Walt Frazier (21) | 9–13 |
| 23 | November 27 | @ Boston | 117–131 | Walt Bellamy (22) | 9–14 |
| 24 | November 30 | Detroit | 108–120 | Walt Bellamy (32) | 10–14 |
| 25 | December 3 | Atlanta | 93–126 | Dick Barnett (24) | 11–14 |
| 26 | December 4 | @ Atlanta | 121–113 | Cazzie Russell (26) | 12–14 |
| 27 | December 7 | Milwaukee | 113–119 | Cazzie Russell (26) | 13–14 |
| 28 | December 8 | N Cincinnati | 115–120 | Dick Barnett (27) | 13–15 |
| 29 | December 10 | Phoenix | 106–111 | Willis Reed (35) | 14–15 |
| 30 | December 11 | @ Baltimore | 110–118 | Dick Barnett (31) | 14–16 |
| 31 | December 13 | @ Chicago | 94–83 | Dick Barnett (22) | 15–16 |
| 32 | December 14 | San Diego | 105–112 | Cazzie Russell (25) | 16–16 |
| 33 | December 15 | @ Philadelphia | 104–110 | Cazzie Russell (25) | 16–17 |
| 34 | December 17 | San Francisco | 99–114 | Walt Bellamy (24) | 17–17 |
| 35 | December 18 | @ Boston | 104–98 | Barnett, Reed (24) | 18–17 |
| 36 | December 20 | @ Detroit | 135–87 | Dave DeBusschere (21) | 19–17 |
| 37 | December 21 | Seattle | 105–131 | Cazzie Russell (27) | 20–17 |
| 38 | December 25 | Philadelphia | 109–110 | Willis Reed (25) | 21–17 |
| 39 | December 27 | @ San Diego | 111–109 | Russell, Reed (23) | 22–17 |
| 40 | December 28 | @ Seattle | 111–108 | Willis Reed (26) | 23–17 |
| 41 | December 29 | N Seattle | 112–120 | Willis Reed (34) | 24–17 |
| 42 | December 31 | Baltimore | 110–121 | Willis Reed (39) | 25–17 |
| 43 | January 4 | Detroit | 103–111 | Cazzie Russell (23) | 26–17 |
| 44 | January 7 | @ Chicago | 101–102 | Willis Reed (28) | 26–18 |
| 45 | January 8 | @ Milwaukee | 115–101 | Willis Reed (25) | 27–18 |
| 46 | January 9 | @ Phoenix | 134–120 | Willis Reed (34) | 28–18 |
| 47 | January 11 | @ San Francisco | 85–77 | Willis Reed (22) | 29–18 |
| 48 | January 12 | @ San Diego | 105–102 | Willis Reed (36) | 30–18 |
| 49 | January 17 | N Seattle | 94–114 | Walt Frazier (27) | 31–18 |
| 50 | January 18 | N Milwaukee | 117–109 | Cazzie Russell (41) | 32–18 |
| 51 | January 19 | @ Atlanta | 96–100 | Walt Frazier (25) | 32–19 |
| 52 | January 21 | Seattle | 106–113 | Willis Reed (27) | 33–19 |
| 53 | January 22 | @ Philadelphia | 137–140 (2OT) | Willis Reed (37) | 33–20 |
| 54 | January 24 | @ Detroit | 106–107 | Dick Barnett (34) | 33–21 |
| 55 | January 25 | Milwaukee | 96–113 | Willis Reed (29) | 34–21 |
| 56 | January 28 | Philadelphia | 88–121 | Willis Reed (30) | 35–21 |
| 57 | January 30 | @ Baltimore | 109–106 | Walt Frazier (28) | 36–21 |
| 58 | February 1 | Boston | 82–109 | Bill Bradley (28) | 37–21 |
| 59 | February 2 | @ Boston | 95–94 | Dick Barnett (24) | 38–21 |
| 60 | February 4 | Atlanta | 97–122 | Bill Bradley (25) | 39–21 |
| 61 | February 5 | @ Milwaukee | 111–102 | Willis Reed (24) | 40–21 |
| 62 | February 7 | @ Chicago | 105–98 | Willis Reed (31) | 41–21 |
| 63 | February 8 | Baltimore | 100–106 | Dick Barnett (32) | 42–21 |
| 64 | February 12 | Phoenix | 105–112 | Willis Reed (28) | 43–21 |
| 65 | February 15 | San Francisco | 92–98 | Walt Frazier (24) | 44–21 |
| 66 | February 18 | Los Angeles | 113–109 | Walt Frazier (30) | 44–22 |
| 67 | February 19 | @ Cincinnati | 100–110 | Walt Frazier (27) | 44–23 |
| 68 | February 22 | San Diego | 108–104 | Walt Frazier (30) | 44–24 |
| 69 | February 25 | Atlanta | 101–122 | Willis Reed (33) | 45–24 |
| 70 | February 26 | @ Boston | 92–88 | Walt Frazier (28) | 46–24 |
| 71 | March 1 | Boston | 96–115 | Willis Reed (30) | 47–24 |
| 72 | March 4 | Detroit | 99–102 | Dave DeBusschere (21) | 48–24 |
| 73 | March 5 | @ Detroit | 120–128 | Dave DeBusschere (26) | 48–25 |
| 74 | March 7 | N Phoenix | 87–119 | Bradley, Frazier (24) | 49–25 |
| 75 | March 9 | @ Philadelphia | 101–110 | Willis Reed (27) | 49–26 |
| 76 | March 11 | Philadelphia | 101–121 | Dave DeBusschere (38) | 50–26 |
| 77 | March 12 | @ Baltimore | 110–111 | Dick Barnett (28) | 50–27 |
| 78 | March 15 | Cincinnati | 108–121 | Willis Reed (36) | 51–27 |
| 79 | March 19 | Baltimore | 100–104 | Willis Reed (37) | 52–27 |
| 80 | March 21 | @ Phoenix | 139–104 | DeBusschere, Frazier (24) | 53–27 |
| 81 | March 22 | @ San Francisco | 117–90 | Dick Barnett (35) | 54–27 |
| 82 | March 23 | @ Los Angeles | 111–128 | Willis Reed (26) | 54–28 |

== Playoffs ==
1969 playoff game log
Division semifinals: 4–0 (home: 2–0; road: 2–0)

| Game | Date | Team | Score | High points | High rebounds | High assists | Location Attendance | Series |
|---|---|---|---|---|---|---|---|---|
| 1 | March 27 | @ Baltimore | W 113–101 | Walt Frazier (26) | Dave DeBusschere (21) | Walt Frazier (11) | Baltimore Civic Center; 11,941 | 1–0 |
| 2 | March 29 | Baltimore | W 107–91 | Dick Barnett (27) | Dave DeBusschere (19) | Walt Frazier (12) | Madison Square Garden; 19,500 | 2–0 |
| 3 | March 30 | @ Baltimore | W 119–116 | Willis Reed (35) | Willis Reed (19) | Walt Frazier (17) | Baltimore Civic Center; 9,927 | 3–0 |
| 4 | April 2 | Baltimore | W 115–108 | Willis Reed (43) | Willis Reed (17) | Walt Frazier (11) | Madison Square Garden; 19,500 | 4–0 |

Division finals: 2–4 (home: 2–1; road: 0–3)

| Game | Date | Team | Score | High points | High rebounds | High assists | Location Attendance | Series |
|---|---|---|---|---|---|---|---|---|
| 1 | April 6 | Boston | L 100–108 | Walt Frazier (34) | Dave DeBusschere (14) | Walt Frazier (8) | Madison Square Garden; 19,500 | 0–1 |
| 2 | April 9 | @ Boston | L 97–112 | Willis Reed (28) | Willis Reed (13) | Walt Frazier (4) | Boston Garden; 14,933 | 0–2 |
| 3 | April 10 | Boston | W 101–91 | Walt Frazier (26) | Willis Reed (14) | Walt Frazier (12) | Madison Square Garden; 19,500 | 1–2 |
| 4 | April 13 | @ Boston | L 96–97 | Willis Reed (22) | Willis Reed (19) | Walt Frazier (6) | Boston Garden; 13,506 | 1–3 |
| 5 | April 14 | Boston | W 112–104 | Willis Reed (24) | Walt Frazier (12) | Walt Frazier (9) | Madison Square Garden; 19,500 | 2–3 |
| 6 | April 18 | @ Boston | L 105–106 | Willis Reed (32) | Willis Reed (11) | Bill Bradley (7) | Boston Garden; 14,933 | 2–4 |

1969 schedule

== Awards and records ==
- Willis Reed, All-NBA Second Team
- Dave DeBusschere, All-NBA Second Team
- Walt Frazier, NBA All-Defensive First Team
- Dave DeBusschere, NBA All-Defensive First Team

== Bibliography ==
- Araton, Harvey (2011). When the Garden Was Eden: Clyde, the Captain, Dollar Bill, and the Glory Days of the New York Knicks. New York City: HarperCollins. ISBN 978-0-06-195623-2.
