= Zaid Abdul-Aziz =

American basketball player (born 1946)

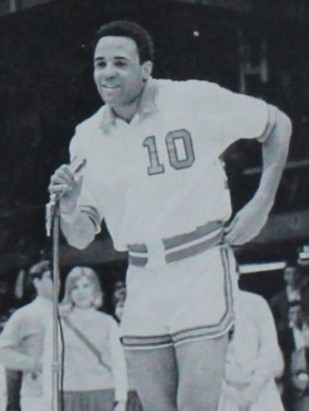
- Abdul-Aziz with the Iowa State Cyclones during the 1967–68 season

Personal information
- Born: April 7, 1946 (age 80) Brooklyn, New York, U.S.
- Listed height: 6 ft 9 in (2.06 m)
- Listed weight: 235 lb (107 kg)

Career information
- High school: John Jay (Brooklyn, New York)
- College: Iowa State (1965–1968)
- NBA draft: 1968: 1st round, 5th overall pick
- Drafted by: Cincinnati Royals
- Playing career: 1968–1978
- Position: Power forward / center
- Number: 21, 16, 35, 6, 54, 27

Career history
- 1968–1969: Cincinnati Royals
- 1969–1970: Milwaukee Bucks
- 1970–1972: Seattle SuperSonics
- 1972–1975: Houston Rockets
- 1976: Seattle SuperSonics
- 1976–1977: Buffalo Braves
- 1978: Boston Celtics
- 1978: Houston Rockets

Career highlights
- Third-team All-American – NABC (1968); Big Eight Player of the Year (1968); 3× First-team All-Big Eight (1966–1968); No. 35 retired by Iowa State Cyclones

Career NBA statistics
- Points: 4,557 (9.0 ppg)
- Rebounds: 4,065 (8.0 rpg)
- Assists: 601 (1.2 apg)
- Stats at NBA.com
- Stats at Basketball Reference

Zaid Abdul-Aziz (born Donald A. Smith; April 7, 1946) is an American former professional basketball player. He was known as Don Smith until he changed his name when he converted to Islam in 1976.

Abdul-Aziz starred for the Iowa State Cyclones in college basketball before he was selected by the Cincinnati Royals as the fifth overall pick in the 1968 NBA draft. He played ten seasons in the National Basketball Association (NBA) as a member of the Royals, Milwaukee Bucks, Seattle SuperSonics, Houston Rockets, Buffalo Braves, and Boston Celtics. Abdul-Aziz was nicknamed "The Kangaroo".

== Playing career ==
Abdul-Aziz played college basketball for the Iowa State Cyclones from 1965 to 1968. He was selected as the Big Eight Player of the Year in 1968 and was a three-time first-team All-Big Eight Conference selection. Abdul-Aziz was chosen by the Cincinnati Royals as the fifth overall pick in the 1968 NBA draft and traded to the Milwaukee Bucks during his rookie season. He was traded to the Seattle SuperSonics for Lucius Allen and Bob Boozer in 1970. Abdul-Aziz initially disputed the trade and planned to sue the NBA but instead flourished with the SuperSonics. He enjoyed a career-best season as he averaged 13.8 points and 11.3 rebounds per game during the 1971–72 season until he was sidelined with pericarditis.

Abdul-Aziz converted to Islam during his time with the SuperSonics. On September 18, 1972, his contract was bought by the Houston Rockets. Abdul-Aziz had been the team's starting center prior to the 1974–75 season. The Muslim holy month of Ramadan coincided with a Rockets training camp where Abdul-Aziz entered an anemic-like state due to his fasting. He found himself unable to play and told the team's general manager that he was quitting the team. Abdul-Aziz's father convinced him to return but he lost his position in the Rockets' line-up and never again played as a starting center in the NBA. Abdul-Aziz played his final three years as a backup on various teams before he announced his retirement in 1978 at the age of 32.

== Later career ==
Abdul-Aziz coached the Saudi Arabia national basketball team. He was an investor in the Seattle Smashers of the International Volleyball Association in 1978 and 1979.

Abdul-Aziz studied chemical dependency at Seattle University and earned a state licence. He worked as a drug and alcohol counselor in Seattle after his playing career.

== NBA career statistics ==
Legend
GP	Games played	GS	Games started	MPG	Minutes per game
FG%	Field goal percentage	3P%	3-point field goal percentage	FT%	Free throw percentage
RPG	Rebounds per game	APG	Assists per game	SPG	Steals per game
BPG	Blocks per game	PPG	Points per game	**Bold**	Career high

=== Regular season ===
Year	Team	GP	GS	MPG	FG%	3P%	FT%	RPG	APG	SPG	BPG	PPG
1968–69	Cincinnati	20	–	5.4	.419	–	.286	1.6	.2	–	–	1.9
1968–69	Milwaukee	29	–	28.9	.363	–	.642	13.0	1.1	–	–	11.0
1969–70	Milwaukee	**80**	–	20.5	.434	–	.643	7.5	.8	–	–	7.4
1970–71	Seattle	61	–	20.9	.441	–	.739	7.7	.7	–	–	10.9
1971–72	Seattle	58	–	30.7	.429	–	.720	11.3	**2.1**	–	–	**13.8**
1972–73	Houston	48	–	18.8	.397	–	.735	6.3	1.1	–	–	8.7
1973–74	Houston	79	–	**31.1**	.459	–	**.804**	**11.7**	**2.1**	**1.0**	**1.3**	10.9
1974–75	Houston	65	–	22.3	.437	–	.783	7.5	1.3	.6	1.1	9.7
1975–76	Seattle	27	–	8.3	**.467**	–	.552	2.8	.6	.3	.6	3.2
1976–77	Buffalo	22	–	8.9	.338	–	.767	4.1	.3	.1	.4	3.8
1977–78	Boston	2	–	12.0	.231	–	.667	7.5	1.5	.5	.5	4.0
1977–78	Houston	14	–	9.6	426	–	.750	2.5	.5	.1	.1	3.9
Career		505	–	21.8	.428	–	.728	8.0	1.2	.6	1.0	9.0

=== Playoffs ===
Year	Team	GP	GS	MPG	FG%	3P%	FT%	RPG	APG	SPG	BPG	PPG
1970	Milwaukee	**7**	–	11.7	.579	–	**.800**	3.7	**0.6**	–	–	4.3
1975	Houston	6	–	11.3	.387	–	.400	2.8	0.5	–	–	4.3
1976	Seattle	5	–	**12.0**	**.700**	–	.727	**4.2**	0.4	–	–	**7.2**
Career		18	–	11.7	.529	–	.500	3.6	0.5	–	–	5.1

== Personal life ==
As of 2011, Abdul-Aziz lived in the Northgate neighborhood of Seattle with his Moroccan-born wife. He has five children from two marriages. Abdul-Aziz's son, Yusef Smith, played college basketball for the Seattle Pacific Falcons and professionally in Brazil.

Abdul-Aziz was raised Catholic. He credits his religious awakening to a Milwaukee Bucks practice session where he was approached by teammate Kareem Abdul-Jabbar and failed to explain a gold cross that he was wearing around his neck when questioned. Abdul-Aziz went to a Milwaukee library to learn about religions and borrowed a copy of the Bhagavad Gita, Bible, Quran and Torah. Abdul-Aziz stated: "Everything pointed me to Islam. So the next year I became a Muslim."

In 2006, Abdul-Aziz published a memoir, Darkness to Sunlight, which tells the stories of his basketball career, personal challenges, and spiritual journey.
