= Howard Komives =

American basketball player

Personal information
- Born: May 9, 1941 Toledo, Ohio, U.S.
- Died: March 22, 2009 (aged 67) Toledo, Ohio, U.S.
- Listed height: 6 ft 1 in (1.85 m)
- Listed weight: 185 lb (84 kg)

Career information
- High school: Woodward (Toledo, Ohio)
- College: Bowling Green (1961–1964)
- NBA draft: 1964: 2nd round, 13th overall pick
- Drafted by: New York Knicks
- Playing career: 1964–1974
- Position: Point guard
- Number: 16, 30, 5, 15

Career history

Playing
- 1964–1968: New York Knicks
- 1968–1972: Detroit Pistons
- 1972–1973: Buffalo Braves
- 1973–1974: Kansas City-Omaha Kings

Coaching
- 1983: Ohio Mixers

Career highlights
- NBA All-Rookie First Team (1965); Third-team All-American – AP, UPI (1964); NCAA scoring champion (1964); 3× First-team All-MAC (1962–1964)

Career NBA statistics
- Points: 7,550 (10.2 ppg)
- Rebounds: 1,804 (2.4 rpg)
- Assists: 2,941 (4.0 apg)
- Stats at NBA.com
- Stats at Basketball Reference

Howard K. "Butch" Komives (/ˈkoʊmaɪvz/ KOH-myvze; May 9, 1941 – March 22, 2009) was an American professional basketball player who spent ten seasons in the National Basketball Association (NBA) with the New York Knicks, Detroit Pistons, Buffalo Braves and Kansas City-Omaha Kings.

Born in Toledo, Ohio, he graduated from Woodward High School in 1960.

== College career ==
Komives played college basketball at Bowling Green State University (BGSU), where he led the team in scoring in each of his three varsity seasons. As a starting shooting guard, he teamed with Nate Thurmond, the school's all-time leading rebounder, to lead the Falcons to back-to-back Mid-American Conference (MAC) championships and NCAA tournament appearances in 1962 and 1963.

Despite Thurmond's graduation and the team's fall to third place in the conference, Komives led the National Collegiate Athletic Association (NCAA) in scoring during the 1963–64 season with 36.7 points per game, still BGSU and MAC records. Even though he no longer is the school's all-time leading scorer (his 1,834 total points is currently third), his 25.8 scoring average is still a Falcons record. Komives still holds the Bowling Green single game scoring record of sixty six points. In this game, he was guarded by Sumner Goldstein, who would later go on to become an attorney.

He was inducted into the BGSU Athletics Hall of Fame in 1970. His son Shane was a four-year basketball letterman at the same school from 1993 to 1996.

== Professional career ==
Komives was selected thirteenth overall in the second round by the New York Knicks in the 1964 NBA draft. He was named to the All-Rookie Team in 1965, after starting in every regular-season match and averaging 12.2 points per game. After the Knicks acquired Dick Barnett prior to the 1965–66 season, Komives was shifted to point guard, a position with which he struggled, drawing the wrath of Knicks fans. The most productive campaign of his professional career was in 1967, when his averages per contest were 15.7 points and 6.2 assists.

By the time Red Holzman became the Knicks' coach midway through the 1967–68 season, Komives was involved in a personal feud with Cazzie Russell that negatively affected the rest of the team. Russell was an ardent supporter of Richard Nixon in the 1968 Presidential election, while Komives worked for the Hubert Humphrey campaign. With the emergence of Walt Frazier as the starting point guard, Komives was traded along with Walt Bellamy to the Pistons for Dave DeBusschere on December 19, 1968. DeBusschere would become the last major addition to the Knicks before it won its first NBA Championship in 1970.

In 2007, Komives was inducted into the Ohio Basketball Hall of Fame.

== Coaching career ==
On September 7, 1983, Komives was announced as the head coach for the Ohio Mixers of the Continental Basketball Association (CBA). On December 22, he resigned after accumulating a 2–8 record.

== Death ==
Komives died at University of Toledo Medical Center on March 22, 2009, at age 67. His wife Marcia had found him unconscious and unresponsive in their home three days earlier.

== Career statistics ==
Legend
GP	Games played	GS	Games started	MPG	Minutes per game
FG%	Field goal percentage	3P%	3-point field goal percentage	FT%	Free throw percentage
RPG	Rebounds per game	APG	Assists per game	SPG	Steals per game
BPG	Blocks per game	PPG	Points per game	**Bold**	Career high
*	Led the league

=== NBA ===
==== Regular season ====
Year	Team	GP	GS	MPG	FG%	FT%	RPG	APG	SPG	BPG	PPG
1964–65	New York	80*	63	29.7	.374	.835	2.4	3.3			12.2
1965–66	New York	80*	**79**	32.7	.391	.861	3.5	5.3			13.9
1966–67	New York	65	4	**35.1**	.404	.858	2.8	**6.2**			**15.7**
1967–68	New York	78	6	21.3	.369	.820	2.2	3.2			7.7
1968–69	New York	32	26	26.1	.346	.849	3.0	4.3			9.0
1968–69	Detroit	53		32.6	.409	.775	**3.8**	5.0			12.9
1969–70	Detroit	**82***		29.5	**.413**	.812	2.4	3.8			11.2
1970–71	Detroit	**82**		23.6	.385	.801	1.9	3.2			8.2
1971–72	Detroit	79		26.2	.373	.808	2.2	3.7			8.7
1972–73	Buffalo	67		21.9	.380	.867	1.8	3.6			6.1
1973–74	Kansas City–Omaha	44		18.9	.406	**.868**	1.0	2.2	.7	.1	4.3
Career		742	178	27.2	.388	.830	2.4	4.0	.7	.1	10.2

==== Playoffs ====
Year	Team	GP	MPG	FG%	FT%	RPG	APG	PPG
1967	New York	4	**32.0**	.271	**.769**	**2.8**	**3.8**	**10.5**
1968	New York	**6**	22.5	**.341**	.667	2.3	**3.8**	5.7
Career		10	26.3	.301	.737	2.5	3.8	7.6
