= 1968–69 Detroit Pistons season =

NBA team season

- Head coach: Donnie Butcher; Paul Seymour
- General manager: Ed Coil
- Owner: Fred Zollner
- Arena: Cobo Center

Results
- Record: 32–50 (.390)
- Place: Division: 6th (Eastern)
- Playoff finish: Did not qualify
- Stats at Basketball Reference

The 1968–69 Detroit Pistons season was the Detroit Pistons' 21st season in the NBA and 12th season in the city of Detroit. The team played at Cobo Arena in Detroit.

The Pistons finished with a 32-50 (.390), 6th place in the Eastern Division. The team fired coach Donnie Butcher after 22 games, replacing him with assistant Paul Seymour in December. Seymour pushed for what would become an ill-advised trade, dealing All-Star and future Hall of Famer Dave DeBusschere to the New York Knicks for journeyman Howard Komives and 7-footer Walt Bellamy, also a Hall of Famer, but one who had worn out welcomes in Baltimore and New York, having a reputation as a malcontent. He proved it in Detroit, lasting a mere 109 games, traded to the Atlanta Hawks a year later, netting the Pistons John Arthurs, who would never play for Detroit. DeBusschere became the final component needed for the 1970 NBA champion Knicks.

Detroit was led on the season by guard Dave Bing (23.4 ppg, 7.1 apg, NBA All-Star) and forward Happy Hairston (18.1 ppg, 11.8 rpg).

== Roster ==
Detroit Pistons roster
Players

| Pos. | No. | Player | Height | Weight | DOB | From |
|---|---|---|---|---|---|---|
| C | 8 | Walt Bellamy | 6 ft 11 in (2.11 m) | 225 lb (102 kg) | | Indiana |
| G | 21 | Dave Bing | 6 ft 3 in (1.91 m) | 180 lb (82 kg) | | Syracuse |
| SF | 43 | Terry Dischinger | 6 ft 7 in (2.01 m) | 189 lb (86 kg) | | Purdue |
| F | 44 | Sonny Dove | 6 ft 7 in (2.01 m) | 198 lb (90 kg) | | St. John's |
| F | 5 | Happy Hairston | 6 ft 7 in (2.01 m) | 255 lb (116 kg) | | NYU |
| F | 25 | Dave Gambee | 6 ft 6 in (1.98 m) | 215 lb (98 kg) | | Oregon State |
| G | 30 | Howard Komives | 6 ft 1 in (1.85 m) | 185 lb (84 kg) | | Bowling Green |
| SF | 23 | McCoy McLemore | 6 ft 7 in (2.01 m) | 230 lb (104 kg) | | Drake |
| F | 24 | Jimmy Walker | 6 ft 3 in (1.91 m) | 195 lb (88 kg) | | Providence |

Coaches
Head coach
- Paul Seymour

Legend
- (DP) Unsigned draft pick
- (FA) Free agent
- (S) Suspended
- Injured

== Regular season ==
=== Season standings ===
| Eastern Division | W | L | PCT | GB | Home | Road | Neutral | Div |
|---|---|---|---|---|---|---|---|---|
| x-Baltimore Bullets | 57 | 25 | .695 | – | 29–9 | 24–15 | 4–1 | 26–14 |
| x-Philadelphia 76ers | 55 | 27 | .671 | 2 | 26–8 | 24–16 | 5–3 | 23–17 |
| x-New York Knicks | 54 | 28 | .659 | 3 | 30–7 | 19–20 | 5–1 | 26–14 |
| x-Boston Celtics | 48 | 34 | .585 | 9 | 24–12 | 21–19 | 3–3 | 23–17 |
| Cincinnati Royals | 41 | 41 | .500 | 16 | 15-13 | 16–21 | 10–7 | 20–20 |
| Detroit Pistons | 32 | 50 | .390 | 25 | 21–17 | 7–30 | 4–3 | 13–27 |
| Milwaukee Bucks | 27 | 55 | .329 | 30 | 15–19 | 8–27 | 4–9 | 7–29 |

x – clinched playoff spot

=== Game log ===
1968–69 Game log
| # | Date | Opponent | Score | High points | Record |
| 1 | October 16 | @ Baltimore | 116–124 | Dave Bing (39) | 0–1 |
| 2 | October 18 | Boston | 106–88 | Dave Bing (20) | 0–2 |
| 3 | October 19 | @ Cincinnati | 115–127 | Dave Bing (24) | 0–3 |
| 4 | October 23 | Los Angeles | 110–117 | Dave Bing (39) | 1–3 |
| 5 | October 25 | Philadelphia | 122–132 | Dave Bing (37) | 2–3 |
| 6 | October 30 | @ Boston | 119–117 | Dave Bing (33) | 3–3 |
| 7 | October 31 | @ Milwaukee | 118–134 | Dave Bing (29) | 3–4 |
| 8 | November 2 | New York | 104–112 | Jimmy Walker (30) | 4–4 |
| 9 | November 6 | Seattle | 118–127 | Dave Bing (37) | 5–4 |
| 10 | November 8 | San Francisco | 118–122 (OT) | Dave Bing (34) | 6–4 |
| 11 | November 10 | @ Phoenix | 128–130 (OT) | Dave Bing (28) | 6–5 |
| 12 | November 13 | @ San Diego | 120–122 | Dave Bing (26) | 6–6 |
| 13 | November 14 | N Phoenix | 109–111 | Bing, Hairston (23) | 7–6 |
| 14 | November 15 | @ San Francisco | 105–133 | Happy Hairston (19) | 7–7 |
| 15 | November 16 | @ Seattle | 119–123 | Dave Bing (35) | 7–8 |
| 16 | November 19 | Cincinnati | 107–121 | Happy Hairston (30) | 8–8 |
| 17 | November 21 | Atlanta | 129–121 | Dave Bing (34) | 8–9 |
| 18 | November 23 | @ Baltimore | 127–128 | Dave Bing (39) | 8–10 |
| 19 | November 26 | N San Diego | 120–134 | Happy Hairston (31) | 9–10 |
| 20 | November 27 | Phoenix | 111–125 | Dave DeBusschere (32) | 10–10 |
| 21 | November 29 | N Cincinnati | 112–122 | Jimmy Walker (29) | 10–11 |
| 22 | November 30 | @ New York | 108–120 | Dave Bing (24) | 10–12 |
| 23 | December 4 | Baltimore | 112–106 | Dave Bing (29) | 10–13 |
| 24 | December 6 | @ Boston | 118–132 | Jimmy Walker (29) | 10–14 |
| 25 | December 7 | @ Philadelphia | 106–140 | Happy Hairston (21) | 10–15 |
| 26 | December 10 | @ Chicago | 83–100 | Eddie Miles (18) | 10–16 |
| 27 | December 11 | Boston | 108–106 | Jimmy Walker (28) | 10–17 |
| 28 | December 14 | Phoenix | 123–118 | Jimmy Walker (28) | 10–18 |
| 29 | December 18 | San Diego | 112–124 | Hairston, Walker (27) | 11–18 |
| 30 | December 20 | New York | 135–87 | Walt Bellamy (18) | 11–19 |
| 31 | December 21 | @ Atlanta | 110–120 | Walt Bellamy (31) | 11–20 |
| 32 | December 25 | @ Milwaukee | 119–113 | Happy Hairston (24) | 12–20 |
| 33 | December 26 | Los Angeles | 95–94 | Dave Bing (31) | 12–21 |
| 34 | December 28 | San Francisco | 102–131 | Eddie Miles (27) | 13–21 |
| 35 | December 29 | @ Los Angeles | 108–111 | Dave Bing (29) | 13–22 |
| 36 | December 31 | @ Los Angeles | 127–107 | Dave Bing (30) | 14–22 |
| 37 | January 3 | Atlanta | 128–106 | Dave Bing (32) | 14–23 |
| 38 | January 4 | @ New York | 103–111 | Bellamy, Bing (28) | 14–24 |
| 39 | January 5 | @ Philadelphia | 119–126 | Happy Hairston (27) | 14–25 |
| 40 | January 7 | Philadelphia | 114–117 | Howard Komives (22) | 15–25 |
| 41 | January 8 | @ Boston | 104–113 | Eddie Miles (21) | 15–26 |
| 42 | January 10 | @ Atlanta | 101–104 | Howard Komives (25) | 15–27 |
| 43 | January 11 | Cincinnati | 115–118 | Hairston, Miles (25) | 16–27 |
| 44 | January 12 | @ Cincinnati | 113–111 | Howard Komives (23) | 17–27 |
| 45 | January 17 | Milwaukee | 108–123 | Happy Hairston (27) | 18–27 |
| 46 | January 19 | Chicago | 111–120 | Eddie Miles (29) | 19–27 |
| 47 | January 20 | N Milwaukee | 102–101 | Walt Bellamy (28) | 19–28 |
| 48 | January 22 | Los Angeles | 115–116 | Eddie Miles (25) | 20–28 |
| 49 | January 24 | New York | 106–107 | Walt Bellamy (28) | 21–28 |
| 50 | January 25 | @ Philadelphia | 106–124 | Walt Bellamy (24) | 21–29 |
| 51 | January 27 | @ Baltimore | 106–126 | Dave Bing (22) | 21–30 |
| 52 | January 29 | San Francisco | 133–126 | Dave Bing (32) | 21–31 |
| 53 | January 30 | N Seattle | 118–144 | Dave Bing (37) | 22–31 |
| 54 | January 31 | @ Chicago | 103–102 | Walt Bellamy (18) | 23–31 |
| 55 | February 1 | @ Atlanta | 99–119 | Jimmy Walker (25) | 23–32 |
| 56 | February 2 | Baltimore | 128–106 | Dave Bing (25) | 23–33 |
| 57 | February 4 | N Cincinnati | 114–125 | Dave Bing (29) | 23–34 |
| 58 | February 5 | Chicago | 120–108 | Dave Bing (28) | 23–35 |
| 59 | February 8 | San Diego | 119–123 (OT) | Walt Bellamy (32) | 24–35 |
| 60 | February 12 | Boston | 113–106 | Dave Bing (28) | 24–36 |
| 61 | February 13 | @ Chicago | 101–120 | Bellamy, Walker (13) | 24–37 |
| 62 | February 14 | Phoenix | 123–128 | Dave Bing (37) | 25–37 |
| 63 | February 16 | @ Seattle | 119–127 | Walt Bellamy (31) | 25–38 |
| 64 | February 18 | @ San Francisco | 114–121 | Dave Bing (22) | 25–39 |
| 65 | February 19 | @ Seattle | 131–124 | Dave Bing (30) | 26–39 |
| 66 | February 20 | Atlanta | 97–87 | Bellamy, Hairston (17) | 26–40 |
| 67 | February 22 | Milwaukee | 108–107 | Happy Hairston (23) | 26–41 |
| 68 | February 24 | @ Baltimore | 119–123 | Terry Dischinger (25) | 26–42 |
| 69 | February 27 | N Philadelphia | 123–126 | Dave Bing (30) | 27–42 |
| 70 | February 28 | Baltimore | 134–116 | Dave Bing (34) | 27–43 |
| 71 | March 2 | Philadelphia | 126–112 | Walt Bellamy (34) | 27–44 |
| 72 | March 4 | @ New York | 99–102 | Walt Bellamy (21) | 27–45 |
| 73 | March 5 | New York | 120–128 | Howard Komives (30) | 28–45 |
| 74 | March 7 | Cincinnati | 105–114 | Dave Bing (24) | 29–45 |
| 75 | March 9 | Milwaukee | 126–121 | Walt Bellamy (28) | 29–46 |
| 76 | March 11 | @ Los Angeles | 101–137 | Dave Bing (22) | 29–47 |
| 77 | March 13 | @ San Diego | 105–120 | Happy Hairston (22) | 29–48 |
| 78 | March 14 | @ San Francisco | 110–114 | Dave Bing (35) | 29–49 |
| 79 | March 16 | @ San Diego | 111–120 | Happy Hairston (22) | 29–50 |
| 80 | March 17 | @ Phoenix | 119–95 | Walt Bellamy (30) | 30–50 |
| 81 | March 21 | Seattle | 104–110 | Dave Gambee (32) | 31–50 |
| 82 | March 23 | Chicago | 114–158 | Happy Hairston (28) | 32–50 |

== Awards and records ==
- Dave DeBusschere, All-NBA Second Team
