= 1968–69 Cincinnati Royals season =

NBA professional basketball team season

- Head coach: Ed Jucker
- Owners: Max Jacobs; Jeremy Jacobs
- Arena: Cincinnati Gardens

Results
- Record: 41–41 (.500)
- Place: Division: 5th (Eastern)
- Playoff finish: Did not qualify
- Stats at Basketball Reference

Local media
- Television: WLWT
- Radio: WLW

The 1968–69 Cincinnati Royals season was the Royals 21st season in the NBA and 12th season in Cincinnati. The season was noteworthy for the team's fast start, in which the team was 15–6 by the end of November. But the team faded in the second half, failing to make the playoff cut in the tough Eastern Division.

== Roster ==
Cincinnati Royals roster
Players

Pos.	No.	Player	Height	Weight	DOB	From
C	24	Connie Dierking	6 ft 9 in (2.06 m)	222 lb (101 kg)		Cincinnati
SF	15	Fred Foster	6 ft 5 in (1.96 m)	210 lb (95 kg)		Miami (OH)
F	21	Fred Hetzel	6 ft 8 in (2.03 m)	220 lb (100 kg)		Davidson
F/C	16	Jerry Lucas	6 ft 8 in (2.03 m)	230 lb (104 kg)		Ohio State
PG	14	Oscar Robertson	6 ft 5 in (1.96 m)	205 lb (93 kg)		Cincinnati
G	10	Adrian Smith	6 ft 1 in (1.85 m)	180 lb (82 kg)		Kentucky
SF	5	Tom Van Arsdale	6 ft 5 in (1.96 m)	202 lb (92 kg)		Indiana
C	13	Walt Wesley	6 ft 11 in (2.11 m)	220 lb (100 kg)		Kansas

Coaches
Head coach
- Ed Jucker

Legend
- (DP) Unsigned draft pick
- (FA) Free agent
- (S) Suspended
- Injured

== Regular season ==
The regular season opened on the road October 16, 1968 against the brand-new Atlanta Hawks, which had just relocated from St. Louis. The Royals won 125–110 behind a balanced attack featuring a rotation of stars Oscar Robertson, Connie Dierking, Jerry Lucas, Adrian Smith, John Tresvant, Tom Van Arsdale and Walt Wesley. The Royals won their first three straight, including their home opener over Detroit on October 19 at Cincinnati Gardens arena. After a pair of losses, Cincinnati won their next six straight, bringing their record to a 9–2 start by November 12. Their 126–115 win over the 10-4 Baltimore Bullets that day gave them the best record in the league. The team went evenly through wins and losses before winning six more in a row in early December, bringing their record to 20–9 by December 15. Two wins in the team's second home, Cleveland Arena, were part of that streak. The December 15th win was another ' road ' home game played in Omaha, Nebraska, a site favored by team General Manager Joel Axelson. The win on the 15th put them in a tie for third-best record in the NBA with the Boston Celtics at 20–9, just behind Baltimore and the Philadelphia 76ers. It also prompted a Sports Illustrated article in their 12/09/1968 issue, ' Serious Contenders In A Funny City ', written by Frank Deford, which left-handedly praised the team, and harshly criticized the city's sports fans and management. The team soon faded after the article, going 21–32 the rest of the season to finish fifth in the East at .500, out of the 1969 NBA playoffs. Their record was better than the 37–45 mark of the Western Division San Diego Rockets, who did make those playoffs.

=== Season standings ===
Eastern Division	W	L	PCT	GB	Home	Road	Neutral	Div
x-Baltimore Bullets	57	25	.695	–	29–9	24–15	4–1	26–14
x-Philadelphia 76ers	55	27	.671	2	26–8	24–16	5–3	23–17
x-New York Knicks	54	28	.659	3	30–7	19–20	5–1	26–14
x-Boston Celtics	48	34	.585	9	24–12	21–19	3–3	23–17
Cincinnati Royals	41	41	.500	16	15-13	16–21	10–7	20–20
Detroit Pistons	32	50	.390	25	21–17	7–30	4–3	13–27
Milwaukee Bucks	27	55	.329	30	15–19	8–27	4–9	7–29

=== Game log ===
1968–69 Game log
#	Date	Opponent	Score	High points	Record
1	October 16	@ Atlanta	125–110	Dierking, Robertson (24)	1–0
2	October 19	Detroit	115–127	Oscar Robertson (24)	2–0
3	October 22	Los Angeles	103–107	Oscar Robertson (28)	3–0
4	October 23	@ Boston	101–108	Connie Dierking (25)	3–1
5	October 26	@ New York	92–98	Jerry Lucas (23)	3–2
6	October 30	New York	114–118	Oscar Robertson (34)	4–2
7	November 1	Milwaukee	114–132	Oscar Robertson (29)	5–2
8	November 2	@ Philadelphia	119–113	Oscar Robertson (25)	6–2
9	November 6	Chicago	122–133	Oscar Robertson (31)	7–2
10	November 9	@ Chicago	110–104	Oscar Robertson (33)	8–2
11	November 12	@ Baltimore	126–115	Tom Van Arsdale (32)	9–2
12	November 13	Baltimore	115–111	Jerry Lucas (26)	9–3
13	November 14	@ New York	110–101	Oscar Robertson (29)	10–3
14	November 15	@ Boston	105–116	Oscar Robertson (28)	10–4
15	November 16	Atlanta	125–130	Oscar Robertson (31)	11–4
16	November 19	@ Detroit	107–121	Dierking, Robertson (23)	11–5
17	November 20	San Francisco	107–113	Oscar Robertson (29)	12–5
18	November 23	Philadelphia	120–105	Tom Van Arsdale (29)	12–6
19	November 27	@ Atlanta	91–94	Oscar Robertson (24)	12–7
20	November 29	N Detroit	112–122	Oscar Robertson (40)	13–7
21	November 30	Atlanta	126–109	Oscar Robertson (24)	13–8
22	December 3	@ Baltimore	129–127	Oscar Robertson (38)	14–8
23	December 7	Boston	117–114 (OT)	Jerry Lucas (31)	14–9
24	December 8	N New York	115–120	Jerry Lucas (32)	15–9
25	December 10	@ Milwaukee	107–96	Tom Van Arsdale (23)	16–9
26	December 11	San Diego	110–116	Oscar Robertson (34)	17–9
27	December 13	N Phoenix	123–130 (OT)	Oscar Robertson (34)	18–9
28	December 14	Milwaukee	115–121	Oscar Robertson (29)	19–9
29	December 15	N Phoenix	101–119	Tom Van Arsdale (28)	20–9
30	December 17	@ Los Angeles	108–112	Oscar Robertson (28)	20–10
31	December 18	@ Phoenix	114–123	Jerry Lucas (24)	20–11
32	December 21	@ San Diego	124–132	Oscar Robertson (39)	20–12
33	December 25	Chicago	98–103	Connie Dierking (31)	21–12
34	December 26	@ Chicago	96–104	Tom Van Arsdale (28)	21–13
35	December 28	Philadelphia	128–123	Jerry Lucas (34)	21–14
36	December 31	@ Boston	114–112	Connie Dierking (28)	22–14
37	January 1	N San Francisco	106–101	Oscar Robertson (37)	22–15
38	January 2	N Milwaukee	109–113	Tom Van Arsdale (28)	23–15
39	January 3	Baltimore	130–125	Oscar Robertson (42)	23–16
40	January 6	N Chicago	106–104	Connie Dierking (25)	24–16
41	January 7	Milwaukee	116–101	Jerry Lucas (22)	24–17
42	January 9	N Seattle	119–110	Connie Dierking (29)	24–18
43	January 11	@ Detroit	115–118	John Tresvant (24)	24–19
44	January 12	Detroit	113–111	Oscar Robertson (36)	24–20
45	January 16	N San Diego	109–120	Jerry Lucas (27)	25–20
46	January 17	@ Los Angeles	107–128	Jerry Lucas (27)	25–21
47	January 19	@ Los Angeles	117–132	Tom Van Arsdale (30)	25–22
48	January 21	@ San Francisco	113–107 (OT)	Tom Van Arsdale (28)	26–22
49	January 26	N Los Angeles	126–113	Connie Dierking (32)	26–23
50	January 28	San Francisco	107–100	Oscar Robertson (23)	26–24
51	January 30	N Philadelphia	115–116	Tom Van Arsdale (26)	27–24
52	January 31	@ Boston	101–116	Connie Dierking (25)	27–25
53	February 1	Seattle	96–111	Oscar Robertson (26)	28–25
54	February 4	N Detroit	114–125	Oscar Robertson (37)	29–25
55	February 5	@ San Diego	93–110	Oscar Robertson (22)	29–26
56	February 6	N Phoenix	103–124	Fred Hetzel (32)	30–26
57	February 7	@ Seattle	97–102	Oscar Robertson (22)	30–27
58	February 8	@ San Francisco	117–116	Oscar Robertson (35)	31–27
59	February 11	N Philadelphia	129–112	Adrian Smith (22)	31–28
60	February 12	San Diego	118–114	Tom Van Arsdale (28)	31–29
61	February 15	@ Chicago	111–101	Oscar Robertson (21)	32–29
62	February 16	Phoenix	125–113	Tom Van Arsdale (23)	32–30
63	February 17	@ Baltimore	117–112	Oscar Robertson (26)	33–30
64	February 18	N Atlanta	123–124	Oscar Robertson (33)	33–31
65	February 19	New York	100–110	Tom Van Arsdale (21)	34–31
66	February 23	Baltimore	126–109	Oscar Robertson (31)	34–32
67	February 25	Philadelphia	120–119	Jerry Lucas (28)	34–33
68	February 27	@ San Diego	112–127	Tom Van Arsdale (23)	34–34
69	February 28	@ San Francisco	115–131	Tom Van Arsdale (23)	34–35
70	March 1	@ Seattle	122–134	Connie Dierking (36)	34–36
71	March 3	@ Seattle	113–107	Jerry Lucas (34)	35–36
72	March 4	@ Phoenix	141–122	Tom Van Arsdale (31)	36–36
73	March 6	@ Milwaukee	112–110	Walt Wesley (25)	37–36
74	March 7	@ Detroit	105–114	Oscar Robertson (26)	37–37
75	March 9	@ Atlanta	107–134	Smith, Van Arsdale (15)	37–38
76	March 13	Boston	110–120	Oscar Robertson (21)	38–38
77	March 14	N Baltimore	128–130 (OT)	Oscar Robertson (33)	38–39
78	March 15	@ New York	108–121	Oscar Robertson (24)	38–40
79	March 19	Los Angeles	128–136 (OT)	Oscar Robertson (28)	39–40
80	March 21	N Boston	119–145	Tom Van Arsdale (20)	39–41
81	March 22	Seattle	127–134	Jerry Lucas (30)	40–41
82	March 24	@ Philadelphia	125–119	Connie Dierking (21)	41–41

== Player statistics ==
Legend
GP	Games played	GS	Games started	MPG	Minutes per game
FG%	Field-goal percentage	3P%	3-point field-goal percentage	FT%	Free-throw percentage
RPG	Rebounds per game	APG	Assists per game	SPG	Steals per game
BPG	Blocks per game	PPG	Points per game

Player	GP	GS	MPG	FG%	3FG%	FT%	RPG	APG	SPG	BPG	PPG
Zaid Abdul-Aziz											
Connie Dierking	82		31.0	.430		.762	9.0	2.7		16.3	
Bill Dinwiddie	69										
Fred Foster											
Pat Frink											
Fred Hetzel											
Jerry Lucas	74		41.6	.551		.755	18.4	4.1	18.3		
Oscar Robertson	79		43.8	.486		.838	6.4	9.8	24.7		
Doug Sims											
Adrian Smith	73										
John Tresvant	51		33.0	.450			8.2				
Al Tucker											
Tom Van Arsdale	77		39.7	.444		.747		2.7		19.4	
Walt Wesley	82										

There was no 3-point line in use this season, blocks and steals were not yet kept NBA statistics.

== Awards and records ==
- Oscar Robertson, All-NBA First Team
- Robertson and Jerry Lucas were each named starters to the Eastern squad for the 1969 NBA All-Star Game. Tom Van Arsdale would make the All Star Team the following season.

== Transactions ==
- February 1, 1969 : starter John Tresvant was traded to Seattle for Al Tucker.
