= Dave Gambee =

American basketball player

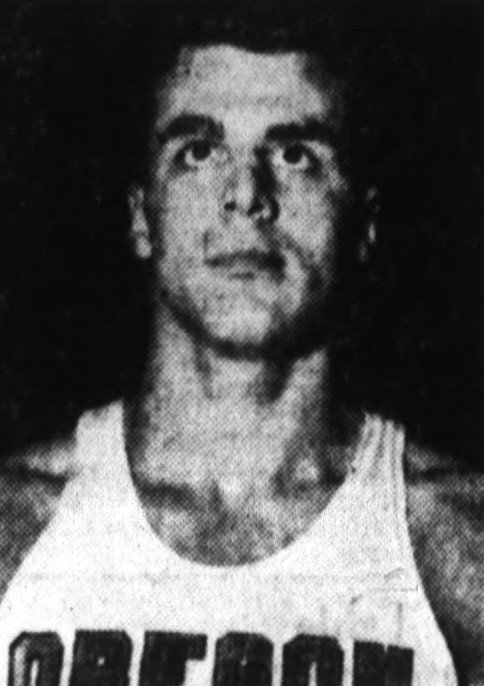
- Gambee, circa 1955

Personal information
- Born: April 16, 1937 (age 89) Portland, Oregon, U.S.
- Listed height: 6 ft 6 in (1.98 m)
- Listed weight: 215 lb (98 kg)

Career information
- High school: Corvallis (Corvallis, Oregon)
- College: Oregon State (1955–1958)
- NBA draft: 1958: 1st round, 6th overall pick
- Drafted by: St. Louis Hawks
- Playing career: 1958–1970
- Position: Small forward
- Number: 33, 25, 12, 20, 30

Career history
- 1958–1960: St. Louis Hawks
- 1960: Cincinnati Royals
- 1960–1967: Syracuse Nationals / Philadelphia 76ers
- 1967–1968: San Diego Rockets
- 1968–1969: Milwaukee Bucks
- 1969: Detroit Pistons
- 1969–1970: San Francisco Warriors

Career highlights
- NBA champion (1967); Consensus second-team All-American (1958); 2× First-team All-PCC (1957, 1958); Second-team All-PCC (1956)

Career statistics
- Points: 7,935 (10.6 ppg)
- Rebounds: 3,891 (5.2 rpg)
- Assists: 757 (1.0 apg)
- Stats at NBA.com
- Stats at Basketball Reference

Dave Gambee (born April 16, 1937) is an American former basketball player in the National Basketball Association (NBA).

== Early life ==
Gambee attended Corvallis High School in Corvallis, Oregon and starred in basketball and baseball.

== College career ==
Gambee chose to stay in town and play college basketball at Oregon State University. Following the 1957–58 season, the 6-foot-7 Gambee was OSU’s career leader in points scored (1,468), was No. 3 in rebounds (828) and he had five 30-plus scoring games. Gambee was named an All-American twice while at Oregon State. He garnered those high honors in 1957 and 1958, and was also a first-team All-Pacific Coast Conference selection both years. He led the Beavers to the 1958 Pacific Coast Title and to three Far West Classic championships. He was the 1957 Classic MVP. While at Oregon State, Gambee also was a 1st baseman and a pitcher on the Beaver Baseball team as well.

In 2010, Gambee was inducted into the Pac-10 Basketball Hall of Honor.

== Professional career ==
Gambee was drafted by the St. Louis Hawks in the first round (6th pick) of the 1958 NBA draft. He played 12 seasons in the NBA with eight different teams (10.6 ppg, 5.2 rpg averages), and retired after the 1969–70 season. Gambee shot free throws underhanded, like Rick Barry.

== NBA career statistics ==
Legend
GP	Games played	GS	Games started	MPG	Minutes per game
FG%	Field goal percentage	3P%	3-point field goal percentage	FT%	Free throw percentage
RPG	Rebounds per game	APG	Assists per game	SPG	Steals per game
BPG	Blocks per game	PPG	Points per game	**Bold**	Career high
†	Won an NBA championship	*	Led the league

=== Regular season ===
Year	Team	GP	GS	MPG	FG%	3P%	FT%	RPG	APG	SPG	BPG	PPG
1958–59	St. Louis	2	-	3.5	**1.000**	-	.000	1.0	0.0	-	-	1.0
1959–60	St. Louis	42	-	10.6	.409	-	.648	3.7	0.7	-	-	5.0
1959–60	Cincinnati	19	-	11.1	.387	-	.657	3.9	0.5	-	-	5.0
1960–61	Syracuse	79*	-	26.5	.419	-	.827	7.4	1.3	-	-	13.7
1961–62	Syracuse	**80***	-	**28.8**	.424	-	.817	**7.9**	**1.4**	-	-	**16.7**
1962–63	Syracuse	60	-	20.6	.438	-	.836	4.8	0.8	-	-	11.2
1963–64	Philadelphia	41	-	22.6	.394	-	.816	6.2	0.9	-	-	11.0
1964–65	Philadelphia	**80***	-	24.9	.412	-	.813	5.9	**1.4**	-	-	12.6
1965–66	Philadelphia	72	-	14.8	.384	-	.850	3.8	1.0	-	-	6.9
1966–67†	Philadelphia	63	-	12.0	.435	-	**.856**	3.1	0.7	-	-	6.5
1967–68	San Diego	**80**	-	21.9	.440	-	.847	5.8	1.2	-	-	13.4
1968–69	Milwaukee	34	-	18.4	.464	-	.827	5.3	0.9	-	-	12.1
1968–69	Detroit	25	-	12.1	.423	-	.790	3.1	0.6	-	-	6.8
1969–70	San Francisco	73	-	13.0	.399	-	.839	3.3	0.8	-	-	7.2
Career		750	-	19.6	.420	-	.822	5.2	1.0	-	-	10.6

=== Playoffs ===
Year	Team	GP	GS	MPG	FG%	3P%	FT%	RPG	APG	SPG	BPG	PPG
1960–61	Syracuse	8	-	26.0	.358	-	.780	6.9	1.5	-	-	12.5
1961–62	Syracuse	5	-	**34.0**	.315	-	.880	**9.0**	0.8	-	-	11.2
1962–63	Syracuse	5	-	15.0	.294	-	.923	3.2	0.0	-	-	6.4
1963–64	Philadelphia	5	-	29.8	.400	-	.778	5.8	**1.6**	-	-	**13.8**
1964–65	Philadelphia	**10**	-	13.2	.333	-	.882	2.3	0.6	-	-	6.2
1965–66	Philadelphia	5	-	16.4	.379	-	.727	2.8	0.8	-	-	6.0
1966–67†	Philadelphia	5	-	4.8	**.545**	-	**1.000**	1.2	0.4	-	-	3.6
Career		43	-	19.5	.356	-	.834	4.4	0.8	-	-	8.5
