= 1968–69 Baltimore Bullets season =

NBA professional basketball team season

- Division champions
- Head coach: Gene Shue
- General manager: Joe Sachs
- Owner: Abe Pollin
- Arena: Baltimore Civic Center

Results
- Record: 57–25 (.695)
- Place: Division: 1st (Eastern)
- Playoff finish: Division semifinals (lost to Knicks 0–4)
- Stats at Basketball Reference

Local media
- Television: WTTG
- Radio: WBAL

The 1968–69 Baltimore Bullets season was their eighth season in the NBA and sixth season in the city of Baltimore. The Bullets continued to rebuild through the draft by selecting center Wes Unseld, a 2-time All-American from Louisville. Unseld would have an immediate impact for the Bullets. He finished 2nd in the NBA in rebounding with 18.2 rebounds per game as the Bullets went from worst to first posting a league best 57–25 record. Rookie Wes Unseld won both the Rookie of the Year and MVP. In the playoffs, the Bullets would show their inexperience as they were swept in 4 straight games by the New York Knicks.

The team also hosted the 1969 NBA All-Star Game held at their arena, the Baltimore Civic Center.

== Roster ==
1968–69 Baltimore Bullets roster
Players

Pos.	No.	Player	Height	Weight	DOB	From
C	23	Leroy Ellis	6 ft 10 in (2.08 m)	210 lb (95 kg)		St. John's
F	25	Gus Johnson	6 ft 6 in (1.98 m)	230 lb (104 kg)		Idaho
G	22	Kevin Loughery	6 ft 3 in (1.91 m)	190 lb (86 kg)		St. John's
F	24	Jack Marin	6 ft 6 in (1.98 m)	210 lb (95 kg)		Duke
G	10	Earl Monroe	6 ft 3 in (1.91 m)	185 lb (84 kg)		Winston-Salem State
G	33	Barry Orms	6 ft 3 in (1.91 m)	190 lb (86 kg)		Saint Louis
F	15	Bob Quick	6 ft 5 in (1.96 m)	215 lb (98 kg)		Xavier
F	31	Ray Scott	6 ft 9 in (2.06 m)	215 lb (98 kg)		Portland
F	41	Wes Unseld	6 ft 7 in (2.01 m)	245 lb (111 kg)		Louisville

Coaches
Head coach
- Gene Shue

Legend
- (DP) Unsigned draft pick
- (FA) Free agent
- (S) Suspended
- Injured

== Regular season ==
=== Season standings ===
Eastern Division	W	L	PCT	GB	Home	Road	Neutral	Div
x-Baltimore Bullets	57	25	.695	–	29–9	24–15	4–1	26–14
x-Philadelphia 76ers	55	27	.671	2	26–8	24–16	5–3	23–17
x-New York Knicks	54	28	.659	3	30–7	19–20	5–1	26–14
x-Boston Celtics	48	34	.585	9	24–12	21–19	3–3	23–17
Cincinnati Royals	41	41	.500	16	15-13	16–21	10–7	20–20
Detroit Pistons	32	50	.390	25	21–17	7–30	4–3	13–27
Milwaukee Bucks	27	55	.329	30	15–19	8–27	4–9	7–29

=== Game log ===
1968–69 game log
#	Date	Opponent	Score	High points	Record
1	October 16	Detroit	116–124	Gus Johnson (29)	1–0
2	October 19	Philadelphia	124–121	Earl Monroe (30)	1–1
3	October 20	@ Phoenix	134–122	Earl Monroe (30)	2–1
4	October 21	N Seattle	104–111	Ellis, Monroe (24)	3–1
5	October 24	@ San Diego	119–115	Earl Monroe (35)	4–1
6	October 25	@ Los Angeles	111–117	Gus Johnson (27)	4–2
7	October 26	@ San Francisco	106–107	Earl Monroe (30)	4–3
8	October 27	@ Seattle	126–114	Earl Monroe (32)	5–3
9	October 29	@ Milwaukee	129–112	Kevin Loughery (29)	6–3
10	October 30	San Francisco	110–112 (OT)	Gus Johnson (31)	7–3
11	November 1	@ New York	119–103	Kevin Loughery (33)	8–3
12	November 6	Atlanta	119–140	Earl Monroe (29)	9–3
13	November 9	San Diego	107–109	Earl Monroe (35)	10–3
14	November 12	Cincinnati	126–115	Ray Scott (27)	10–4
15	November 13	@ Cincinnati	115–111	Earl Monroe (33)	11–4
16	November 15	Milwaukee	102–129	Gus Johnson (28)	12–4
17	November 20	San Diego	110–114	Earl Monroe (28)	13–4
18	November 22	@ Philadelphia	110–121	Kevin Loughery (27)	13–5
19	November 23	Detroit	127–128	Gus Johnson (32)	14–5
20	November 24	@ Atlanta	118–111	Earl Monroe (28)	15–5
21	November 26	Atlanta	99–102	Earl Monroe (29)	16–5
22	November 27	N San Diego	123–107	Kevin Loughery (21)	16–6
23	November 29	Phoenix	106–124	Kevin Loughery (23)	17–6
24	December 1	Chicago	100–110	Earl Monroe (25)	18–6
25	December 3	Cincinnati	129–127	Kevin Loughery (28)	18–7
26	December 4	@ Detroit	112–106	Wes Unseld (28)	19–7
27	December 5	Los Angeles	90–108	Earl Monroe (26)	20–7
28	December 10	@ Boston	115–101	Earl Monroe (23)	21–7
29	December 11	New York	110–118	Johnson, Unseld (22)	22–7
30	December 14	Boston	101–110	Earl Monroe (25)	23–7
31	December 18	San Francisco	100–109	Kevin Loughery (26)	24–7
32	December 20	N Chicago	102–125	Earl Monroe (24)	25–7
33	December 21	Phoenix	117–131	Kevin Loughery (30)	26–7
34	December 25	Seattle	112–118	Earl Monroe (25)	27–7
35	December 26	@ Philadelphia	120–125	Jack Marin (33)	27–8
36	December 27	Milwaukee	122–136	Earl Monroe (32)	28–8
37	December 29	@ Atlanta	99–101	Earl Monroe (33)	28–9
38	December 31	@ New York	110–121	Gus Johnson (27)	28–10
39	January 3	@ Cincinnati	130–125	Earl Monroe (35)	29–10
40	January 4	Philadelphia	112–117	Wes Unseld (29)	30–10
41	January 7	Los Angeles	100–93	Earl Monroe (22)	30–11
42	January 8	@ San Diego	108–107	Jack Marin (27)	31–11
43	January 10	@ San Diego	106–104	Kevin Loughery (26)	32–11
44	January 11	@ Phoenix	118–107	Jack Marin (30)	33–11
45	January 20	Boston	109–122	Kevin Loughery (38)	34–11
46	January 21	@ Chicago	116–93	Earl Monroe (32)	35–11
47	January 22	Seattle	98–94	Kevin Loughery (27)	35–12
48	January 25	Atlanta	112–109	Earl Monroe (31)	35–13
49	January 26	@ Boston	86–124	Kevin Loughery (19)	35–14
50	January 27	Detroit	106–126	Kevin Loughery (37)	36–14
51	January 30	New York	109–106	Earl Monroe (33)	36–15
52	January 31	@ Philadelphia	108–105	Earl Monroe (27)	37–15
53	February 2	@ Detroit	128–106	Ray Scott (26)	38–15
54	February 3	Chicago	122–132	Kevin Loughery (35)	39–15
55	February 5	Boston	112–124	Earl Monroe (30)	40–15
56	February 7	@ Milwaukee	114–107	Earl Monroe (41)	41–15
57	February 8	@ New York	100–106	Kevin Loughery (31)	41–16
58	February 9	@ Atlanta	102–101	Earl Monroe (29)	42–16
59	February 11	@ Chicago	124–116	Earl Monroe (33)	43–16
60	February 12	San Francisco	110–120	Earl Monroe (29)	44–16
61	February 14	Milwaukee	122–132	Monroe, Unseld (28)	45–16
62	February 17	Cincinnati	117–112	Earl Monroe (30)	45–17
63	February 19	Los Angeles	88–110	Earl Monroe (34)	46–17
64	February 20	N Phoenix	121–124	Earl Monroe (30)	47–17
65	February 23	@ Cincinnati	126–109	Earl Monroe (23)	48–17
66	February 24	Detroit	119–123	Kevin Loughery (31)	49–17
67	February 27	@ Milwaukee	117–126	Kevin Loughery (25)	49–18
68	February 28	@ Detroit	134–116	Kevin Loughery (29)	50–18
69	March 4	@ Los Angeles	116–108	Earl Monroe (35)	51–18
70	March 5	@ San Francisco	107–114	Earl Monroe (42)	51–19
71	March 7	@ San Francisco	130–135 (OT)	Kevin Loughery (43)	51–20
72	March 8	@ Seattle	117–138	Earl Monroe (22)	51–21
73	March 9	@ Los Angeles	109–120	Loughery, Monroe (29)	51–22
74	March 10	@ Phoenix	140–121	Earl Monroe (33)	52–22
75	March 12	New York	110–111	Ray Scott (28)	53–22
76	March 14	N Cincinnati	128–130 (OT)	Jack Marin (35)	54–22
77	March 15	Boston	98–99	Earl Monroe (31)	55–22
78	March 18	Seattle	120–130	Kevin Loughery (32)	56–22
79	March 19	@ New York	100–104	Kevin Loughery (30)	56–23
80	March 21	@ Chicago	115–103	Earl Monroe (41)	57–23
81	March 22	Philadelphia	116–108	Quick, Workman (17)	57–24
82	March 23	@ Boston	98–126	Jack Marin (19)	57–25

== Playoffs ==
1969 playoff game log
Division semifinals: 0–4 (home: 0–2; road: 0–2)

Game	Date	Team	Score	High points	High rebounds	High assists	Location Attendance	Series
1	March 27	New York	L 101–113	Earl Monroe (32)	Wes Unseld (13)	Monroe, Unseld (3)	Baltimore Civic Center; 11,941	0–1
2	March 29	@ New York	L 91–107	Earl Monroe (29)	Wes Unseld (27)	Kevin Loughery (4)	Madison Square Garden; 19,500	0–2
3	March 30	New York	L 116–119	Kevin Loughery (29)	Wes Unseld (14)	Kevin Loughery (7)	Baltimore Civic Center; 9,927	0–3
4	April 2	@ New York	L 108–115	Monroe, Unseld (25)	Wes Unseld (20)	Kevin Loughery (7)	Madison Square Garden; 19,500	0–4

1969 schedule

== Awards and honors ==
- Earl Monroe, All-NBA First Team
- Wes Unseld, All-NBA First Team
- Wes Unseld, NBA Rookie of the Year
- Wes Unseld, NBA Most Valuable Player
