= 1968–69 Phoenix Suns season =

Professional basketball season

- Head coach: Johnny "Red" Kerr
- General manager: Jerry Colangelo
- Owners: Karl Eller, Don Pitt, Don Diamond, Bhavik Darji, Marvin Meyer, Richard L. Bloch
- Arena: Arizona Veterans Memorial Coliseum

Results
- Record: 16–66 (.195)
- Place: Division: 7th (Western)
- Playoff finish: Did not qualify
- Stats at Basketball Reference

Local media
- Television: KTAR-TV
- Radio: KTAR

The 1968–69 Phoenix Suns season was the inaugural season for the Phoenix Suns of the National Basketball Association. Head coach Red Kerr led the franchise to its first win in their debut game, over the Seattle SuperSonics. The Suns lost more games in their initial season than in any year since, and did not have a winning record against any other team. They played all their home games in the Arizona Veterans Memorial Coliseum.

Dick Van Arsdale was the franchise's first All-Star selection when he was selected to play in the 1969 All-Star Game. He was the team's second leading scorer at 21 points per game, behind eventual Hall of Fame member Gail Goodrich, who averaged 23.8, the seventh-highest in the league for the season. Goodrich was selected to replace an injured Jerry West in the All-Star Game.

== Offseason ==
=== NBA expansion draft ===
Player	Position	Nationality	Former team
John Barnhill	Guard	United States	San Diego Rockets
Em Bryant	Guard	United States	New York Knicks
Gail Goodrich	Guard	United States	Los Angeles Lakers
Dennis Hamilton	Forward	United States	Los Angeles Lakers
Neil Johnson	Forward	United States	New York Knicks
Dave Lattin	Forward	United States	San Francisco Warriors
Paul Long	Guard	United States	Detroit Pistons
Stan McKenzie	Forward	United States	Baltimore Bullets
McCoy McLemore	Forward	United States	Chicago Bulls
Bill Melchionni	Guard	United States	Philadelphia 76ers
Dave Schellhase	Guard	United States	Chicago Bulls
Dick Snyder	Guard	United States	Atlanta Hawks
Craig Spitzer	Center	United States	Chicago Bulls
Bumper Tormohlen	Center	United States	Atlanta Hawks
Dick Van Arsdale	Forward	United States	New York Knicks
Roland West	Guard	United States	Baltimore Bullets
John Wetzel	Forward	United States	Los Angeles Lakers
George Wilson	Center	United States	Seattle SuperSonics

The Suns participated in the NBA's fourth expansion draft along with the Milwaukee Bucks, the other expansion team that joined the league in 1968. Each of the league's other 12 teams protected seven of their top players, with the remaining unprotected players available in the draft. The two expansion teams selected three players from each team, totaling 18 selections each.

The Suns received the first, fourth and fifth picks, while the Bucks, which had not yet chosen their team name at the time, received the second and third picks. The Suns' first selection was swingman Dick Van Arsdale of the New York Knicks. The Bucks then selected center Wayne Embry of the Boston Celtics, and power forward Fred Hetzel of the San Francisco Warriors. The Suns rounded out the top five by picking point guard Gail Goodrich of the Los Angeles Lakers and shooting guard Dick Snyder of the Atlanta Hawks. "The Original Sun" Dick Van Arsdale would have a historic career with the Suns after being drafted, with him being an All-Star in his first three seasons with the team, as well as be named a member of the All-Defensive Second Team in 1974 and helping the team reach the 1976 NBA Finals before retiring in 1977, having his number become the second in franchise history to be retired into the Phoenix Suns Ring of Honor in the 1977–78 season, behind Connie Hawkins.

=== NBA draft ===
Round	Pick	Player	Position	Nationality	College
1	8	Gary Gregor	Forward	United States	South Carolina
2	22	Dick Cunningham	Center	United States	Murray State
3	36	Art Beatty	Center	United States	American
4	49	Rich Jones	Forward	United States	Memphis
5	64	Harry Hollines	Guard	United States	Denver
6	77	Rod Knowles	Center	United States	Davidson
7	92	Charles Parks	Forward	United States	Idaho State
8	105	Brian Clare	Center	United States	Denver
9	120	Mervin Jackson	Guard	United States	Utah
10	133	Lee Davis	Center	United States	North Carolina Central
11	147	Ron Boone	Guard	United States	Idaho State
12	160	Bill Davis	Forward	United States	Arizona
13	171	Pat Hobart	Forward	United States	California State

== Roster ==
1968–69 Phoenix Suns roster
Players

Pos.	No.	Player	Height	Weight	DOB	From
C	31	Jim Fox	6 ft 10 in (2.08 m)	230 lb (104 kg)	1943-04-07	South Carolina
PG	25	Gail Goodrich	6 ft 1 in (1.85 m)	170 lb (77 kg)	1943-04-23	UCLA
PF	44	Gary Gregor	6 ft 7 in (2.01 m)	225 lb (102 kg)	1945-08-13	South Carolina
PF	11	Neil Johnson	6 ft 7 in (2.01 m)	220 lb (100 kg)	1943-04-17	Creighton
PF	43	Dave Lattin	6 ft 6 in (1.98 m)	225 lb (102 kg)	1943-12-23	UTEP
SF	40	Stan McKenzie	6 ft 5 in (1.96 m)	195 lb (88 kg)	1944-10-06	NYU
SF	10	Dick Snyder	6 ft 5 in (1.96 m)	207 lb (94 kg)	1944-02-01	Davidson
SG	5	Dick Van Arsdale	6 ft 5 in (1.96 m)	210 lb (95 kg)	1943-02-22	Indiana
SG	23	Bob Warlick	6 ft 5 in (1.96 m)	200 lb (91 kg)	1941-03-20	Pepperdine

Coaches
Head coach
- Johnny "Red" Kerr

Legend
- (DP) Unsigned draft pick
- (FA) Free agent
- (S) Suspended
- Injured

Roster
Updated: January 20, 1969

== Regular season ==
=== Standings ===
Western Division	W	L	PCT	GB	Home	Road	Neutral	Div
x-Los Angeles Lakers	55	27	.671	–	32–9	21–18	2–0	30–10
x-Atlanta Hawks	48	34	.585	7	28–12	18–21	2–1	26–14
x-San Francisco Warriors	41	41	.500	14	22–19	18–21	1–1	20–20
x-San Diego Rockets	37	45	.451	18	25–16	8–25	4–4	20–20
Chicago Bulls	33	49	.402	22	19–21	12–25	2–3	19–21
Seattle SuperSonics	30	52	.366	25	18–18	6–29	6–5	15–23
Phoenix Suns	16	66	.195	39	11–26	4–28	1–12	8–30

=== Game log ===
1968–69 game log
Total: 16–66 (home: 12–29; road: 4–37)
October: 4–3 (home: 3–2; road: 1–1)

Game	Date	Team	Score	High points	Location Attendance	Record	Streak
1	October 18	Seattle	W 116–107	Gail Goodrich (27)	Arizona Veterans Memorial Coliseum; 7,112	1–0	W 1
2	October 20	Baltimore	L 122–134	Dick Van Arsdale (26)	Arizona Veterans Memorial Coliseum; 3,474	1–1	L 1
3	October 22	@ San Francisco	L 101–109	Gail Goodrich (29)	Oakland–Alameda County Coliseum Arena; 4,291	1–2	L 2
4	October 24	New York	W 109–92	Gail Goodrich (31)	Arizona Veterans Memorial Coliseum; 3,450	2–2	W 1
5	October 27	Atlanta	L 100–123	Gail Goodrich (23)	Arizona Veterans Memorial Coliseum; 4,603	2–3	L 1
6	October 30	@ Seattle	W 115–108	Gail Goodrich (32)	Seattle Center Coliseum; 2,657	3–3	W 1
7	October 31	Chicago	W 112–103	Gail Goodrich (30)	Arizona Veterans Memorial Coliseum; 3,029	4–3	W 2

November: 1–12 (home: 1–5; road: 0–7)

Game	Date	Team	Score	High points	Location Attendance	Record	Streak
8	November 3	Los Angeles	L 109–127	Dick Van Arsdale (38)	Arizona Veterans Memorial Coliseum; 7,150	4–4	L 1
9	November 4	San Francisco	L 108–119	Dick Van Arsdale (29)	Arizona Veterans Memorial Coliseum; 3,019	4–5	L 2
10	November 10	Detroit	W 130–128 (OT)	George Wilson (33)	Arizona Veterans Memorial Coliseum; 4,440	5–5	W 1
11	November 14	Detroit	L 109–111	Gail Goodrich (25)	Tucson, AZ; 2,712	5–6	L 1
12	November 15	@ Seattle	L 124–128 (2OT)	Dick Van Arsdale (34)	Seattle Center Coliseum; 4,368	5–7	L 2
13	November 17	Boston	L 98–130	Gail Goodrich, Dave Lattin (13)	Arizona Veterans Memorial Coliseum; 9,109	5–8	L 3
14	November 19	@ Philadelphia	L 110–126	Dick Van Arsdale (29)	New York City, NY; 16,664	5–9	L 4
15	November 22	@ Boston	L 106–133	McCoy McLemore (18)	Boston Garden; 8,224	5–10	L 5
16	November 23	@ Milwaukee	L 112–115	McCoy McLemore (28)	Milwaukee Arena; 6,090	5–11	L 6
17	November 26	Philadelphia	L 119–126	Gail Goodrich (32)	Arizona Veterans Memorial Coliseum; 3,209	5–12	L 7
18	November 27	@ Detroit	L 111–125	George Wilson (24)	Cobo Arena; 11,016	5–13	L 8
19	November 29	@ Baltimore	L 106–124	Gail Goodrich, Dick Van Arsdale (24)	Baltimore Civic Center; 6,596	5–14	L 9
20	November 30	@ Chicago	L 96–100	Dick Van Arsdale (29)	Chicago Stadium; 3,246	5–15	L 10

December: 3–15 (home: 2–5; road: 1–10)

Game	Date	Team	Score	High points	Location Attendance	Record	Streak
21	December 2	Seattle	L 108–118	Gail Goodrich (26)	Arizona Veterans Memorial Coliseum; 2,171	5–16	L 11
22	December 3	@ Los Angeles	L 108–122	Gail Goodrich (23)	The Forum; 8,277	5–17	L 12
23	December 4	San Francisco	W 126–97	Gail Goodrich (32)	Arizona Veterans Memorial Coliseum; 2,387	6–17	W 1
24	December 6	@ San Diego	L 106–117	Dick Van Arsdale (33)	San Diego Sports Arena; 5,782	6–18	L 1
25	December 8	Atlanta	L 99–121	Dick Van Arsdale (17)	Arizona Veterans Memorial Coliseum; 3,243	6–19	L 2
26	December 10	@ New York	L 106–111	Gail Goodrich (29)	Madison Square Garden; 16,337	6–20	L 3
27	December 11	@ Philadelphia	L 123–143	Gail Goodrich (19)	The Spectrum; 6,780	6–21	L 4
28	December 13	@ Cincinnati	L 123–130 (OT)	Dick Van Arsdale (31)	Cleveland, OH; 2,114	6–22	L 5
29	December 14	@ Detroit	W 123–118	Gail Goodrich (41)	Cobo Arena; 5,024	7–22	W 1
30	December 15	@ Cincinnati	L 101–119	Stan McKenzie (28)	Omaha, NE; 5,886	7–23	L 1
31	December 17	Philadelphia	L 128–145	Dick Snyder (25)	Arizona Veterans Memorial Coliseum; 1,946	7–24	L 2
32	December 18	Cincinnati	W 123–114	Gail Goodrich (34)	Arizona Veterans Memorial Coliseum; 3,462	8–24	W 1
33	December 21	@ Baltimore	L 117–131	Gail Goodrich (28)	Baltimore Civic Center; 8,529	8–25	L 1
34	December 22	@ Milwaukee	L 116–127	Dick Van Arsdale (26)	Milwaukee Arena; 3,466	8–26	L 2
35	December 25	Los Angeles	L 99–119	Dick Van Arsdale (27)	Arizona Veterans Memorial Coliseum; 10,355	8–27	L 3
36	December 26	@ San Francisco	L 118–119	Gail Goodrich (40)	Oakland–Alameda County Coliseum Arena; 4,916	8–28	L 4
37	December 28	San Diego	L 126–136	Gail Goodrich (29)	Arizona Veterans Memorial Coliseum; 5,749	8–29	L 5
38	December 30	@ Seattle	L 118–120	Jim Fox (24)	Seattle Center Coliseum; 3,920	8–30	L 6

January: 3–12 (home: 3–6; road: 0–6)

Game	Date	Team	Score	High points	Location Attendance	Record	Streak
39	January 1	Boston	L 87–93	Dick Van Arsdale (22)	Arizona Veterans Memorial Coliseum; 4,757	8–31	L 7
40	January 3	@ Milwaukee	L 104–121	Dick Snyder (22)	Milwaukee Arena; 4,230	8–32	L 8
41	January 4	@ Chicago	L 92–103	Jim Fox (27)	Chicago Stadium; 3,107	8–33	L 9
42	January 5	@ Atlanta	L 96–97	Dick Snyder, Dick Van Arsdale (22)	Alexander Memorial Coliseum; 3,235	8–34	L 10
43	January 7	Seattle	W 116–112	Gail Goodrich (35)	Arizona Veterans Memorial Coliseum; 2,875	9–34	W 1
44	January 9	New York	L 120–134	Stan McKenzie (18)	Arizona Veterans Memorial Coliseum; 2,591	9–35	L 1
45	January 11	Baltimore	L 107–118	Gary Gregor (19)	Arizona Veterans Memorial Coliseum; 3,807	9–36	L 2
All-Star Break
46	January 16	@ Atlanta	L 107–112	Gary Gregor (26)	Columbia, SC; 5,815	9–37	L 3
47	January 17	@ Atlanta	L 107–112	Gail Goodrich (27)	Alexander Memorial Coliseum; 4,565	9–38	L 4
48	January 19	San Diego	L 118–136	Gail Goodrich (29)	San Diego Sports Arena; 2,867	9–39	L 5
49	January 22	Atlanta	L 107–125	Bob Warlick (23)	Arizona Veterans Memorial Coliseum; 2,527	9–40	L 6
50	January 24	Chicago	W 117–106	Dick Van Arsdale (27)	Arizona Veterans Memorial Coliseum; 6,275	10–40	W 1
51	January 25	@ San Diego	L 120–133	Jim Fox, Gail Goodrich (22)	San Diego Sports Arena; 4,128	10–41	L 1
52	January 26	San Francisco	L 93–117	Neil Johnson (22)	Arizona Veterans Memorial Coliseum; 2,452	10–42	L 2
53	January 29	Milwaukee	W 111–107	Gail Goodrich (33)	Tacoma, WA; 3,013	11–42	W 1

February: 3–14 (home: 2–4; road: 1–10)

Game	Date	Team	Score	High points	Location Attendance	Record	Streak
54	February 2	Milwaukee	W 122–121	Gail Goodrich (37)	Arizona Veterans Memorial Coliseum; 2,926	12–42	W 2
55	February 4	Philadelphia	W 125–116	Jim Fox, Dick Van Arsdale (25)	Arizona Veterans Memorial Coliseum; 3,317	13–42	W 3
56	February 6	Cincinnati	L 103–124	Gail Goodrich (35)	Tucson, AZ; 3,849	13–43	L 1
57	February 7	@ San Diego	L 119–130	Gail Goodrich (33)	San Diego Sports Arena; 6,214	13–44	L 2
58	February 8	Los Angeles	L 104–122	Gail Goodrich (29)	Arizona Veterans Memorial Coliseum; 9,106	13–45	L 3
59	February 9	@ Los Angeles	L 116–134	Gail Goodrich (29)	The Forum; 8,840	13–46	L 4
60	February 12	@ New York	L 105–112	Gail Goodrich (26)	Madison Square Garden; 12,017	13–47	L 5
61	February 14	@ Detroit	L 123–128	Jim Fox (24)	Cobo Arena; 2,853	13–48	L 6
62	February 16	@ Cincinnati	W 125–113	Gail Goodrich (25)	Cincinnati Gardens; 3,922	14–48	W 1
63	February 18	@ Boston	L 110–116	Gail Goodrich (29)	Boston Garden; 7,022	14–49	L 1
64	February 20	@ Baltimore	L 121–124	Dick Van Arsdale (44)	Detroit, MI; 7,066	14–50	L 2
65	February 21	Chicago	L 121–133	Gail Goodrich (43)	Arizona Veterans Memorial Coliseum; 4,939	14–51	L 3
66	February 22	Boston	L 100–124	Dick Van Arsdale (21)	Arizona Veterans Memorial Coliseum; 8,295	14–52	L 4
67	February 23	@ Milwaukee	L 103–107	Gail Goodrich (29)	Green Bay, WI; 4,347	14–53	L 5
68	February 25	@ Boston	L 99–112	Dick Van Arsdale (22)	New York City, NY; 19,500	14–54	L 6
69	February 26	@ Philadelphia	L 97–104	Dick Van Arsdale (22)	The Spectrum; 7,781	14–55	L 7
70	February 28	@ Los Angeles	L 117–121	Gail Goodrich (43)	The Forum; 15,728	14–56	L 8

March: 2–10 (home: 1–7; road: 1–3)

Game	Date	Team	Score	High points	Location Attendance	Record	Streak
71	March 1	@ San Francisco	W 119–118	Gail Goodrich (33)	Oakland–Alameda County Coliseum Arena; 3,580	15–56	W 1
72	March 4	Cincinnati	L 122–141	Gail Goodrich (37)	Arizona Veterans Memorial Coliseum; 3,165	15–57	L 1
73	March 6	@ Chicago	L 117–125 (OT)	Gail Goodrich (33)	Carbondale, IL; 3,125	15–58	L 2
74	March 7	@ New York	L 87–119	Bob Warlick (18)	Philadelphia, PA; 15,244	15–59	L 3
75	March 9	San Diego	W 146–133	Gail Goodrich (47)	Arizona Veterans Memorial Coliseum; 2,384	16–59	W 1
76	March 10	Baltimore	L 121–140	Dick Van Arsdale (37)	Arizona Veterans Memorial Coliseum; 4,133	16–60	L 1
77	March 11	@ San Diego	L 106–116	Dick Van Arsdale (26)	San Diego Sports Arena; 4,172	16–61	L 2
78	March 15	San Diego	L 124–141	Gail Goodrich (38)	Tucson, AZ; 2,616	16–62	L 3
79	March 17	Detroit	L 95–119	Stan McKenzie (18)	Arizona Veterans Memorial Coliseum; 3,128	16–63	L 4
80	March 19	Milwaukee	L 110–117	Dick Van Arsdale (32)	Arizona Veterans Memorial Coliseum; 3,033	16–64	L 5
81	March 21	New York	L 104–139	Gary Gregor (23)	Arizona Veterans Memorial Coliseum; 7,175	16–65	L 6
82	March 23	Milwaukee	L 118–128	Dick Van Arsdale (31)	Arizona Veterans Memorial Coliseum; 3,204	16–66	L 7

1968–69 schedule

== Awards and honors ==
=== All-Star ===
- Dick Van Arsdale was selected as a reserve for the Western Conference in the All-Star Game. It was his first All-Star selection.
- Gail Goodrich was selected to replace Jerry West in the All-Star Game. It was his first All-Star selection.

=== Season ===
- Gary Gregor was named to the NBA All-Rookie First Team.

== Player statistics ==
Legend
GP	Games played	MPG	Minutes per game
FG%	Field-goal percentage	FT%	Free-throw percentage
RPG	Rebounds per game	APG	Assists per game
PPG	Points per game

=== Season ===
Player	GP	MPG	FG%	FT%	RPG	APG	PPG
Ed Biedenbach	7	2.6	.000	.667	0.3	0.4	0.6
Jim Fox*	51	38.8	.470	.734	13.3	2.8	13.8
Gail Goodrich	81	40.0	.411	.747	5.4	6.4	23.8
Gary Gregor	80	27.3	.415	.649	8.9	1.2	11.1
Neil Johnson	80	16.5	.481^	.621	5.0	1.7	5.8
Rod Knowles*	8	5.0	.286	.333	1.1	0.0	1.1
Dave Lattin	68	14.5	.410	.634	4.8	0.7	6.0
Stan McKenzie	80	19.6	.427	.763+	3.1	1.5	9.3
McCoy McLemore*	31	22.9	.385	.773+	5.4	1.6	11.8
Dick Snyder	81	26.0	.472^	.725	4.0	2.6	12.1
Dick Van Arsdale	80	42.4	.442	.705	6.9	4.8	21.0
Bob Warlick*	63	15.5	.423	.606	2.4	2.1	8.0
George Wilson*	41	31.6	.397	.616	12.3	1.9	11.6

* – Stats with the Suns.
^ – Minimum 230 field goals.
+ – Minimum 230 free throws.

== Transactions ==
=== Trades ===
August 27, 1968	To Boston Celtics (United States) Em Bryant	To Phoenix Suns 1969 second-round draft pick ( (United States) Gene Williams)
September 11, 1968	To Atlanta Hawks (United States) Dennis Hamilton	To Phoenix Suns 1969 third-round draft pick ( (United States) Lloyd Kerr)
September 12, 1968	To Milwaukee Bucks (United States) Dick Cunningham	To Phoenix Suns 1973 second-round draft pick ( (United States) Gary Melchionni) Cash considerations
December 17, 1968	To Detroit Pistons (United States) McCoy McLemore	To Phoenix Suns (United States) Jim Fox 1969 third-round draft pick ( (United States) Lamar Green)
January 20, 1969	To Philadelphia 76ers (United States) George Wilson	To Phoenix Suns (United States) Jerry Chambers

=== Free agents ===
==== Additions ====
Date	Player	Contract	Former Team
October 18, 1968	Ed Biedenbach	Undisclosed	Los Angeles Lakers
November 8, 1968	Bob Warlick	Undisclosed	Milwaukee Bucks

==== Subtractions ====
Date	Player	Reason left	New team
October 1, 1968	Paul Long	Waived	Los Angeles Lakers
November 6, 1968	Rod Knowles	Waived	New York Nets (ABA)
November 21, 1968	Ed Biedenbach	Waived	—N/a (Retired for coaching)
