= List of NBA career playoff rebounding leaders =

This article provides two lists:

A list of National Basketball Association players by total career playoffs rebounds recorded.

A progressive list of rebound leaders showing how the record has increased through the years.

== Career playoff rebound leaders ==
This is a list of National Basketball Association players by total career playoffs rebounds recorded.

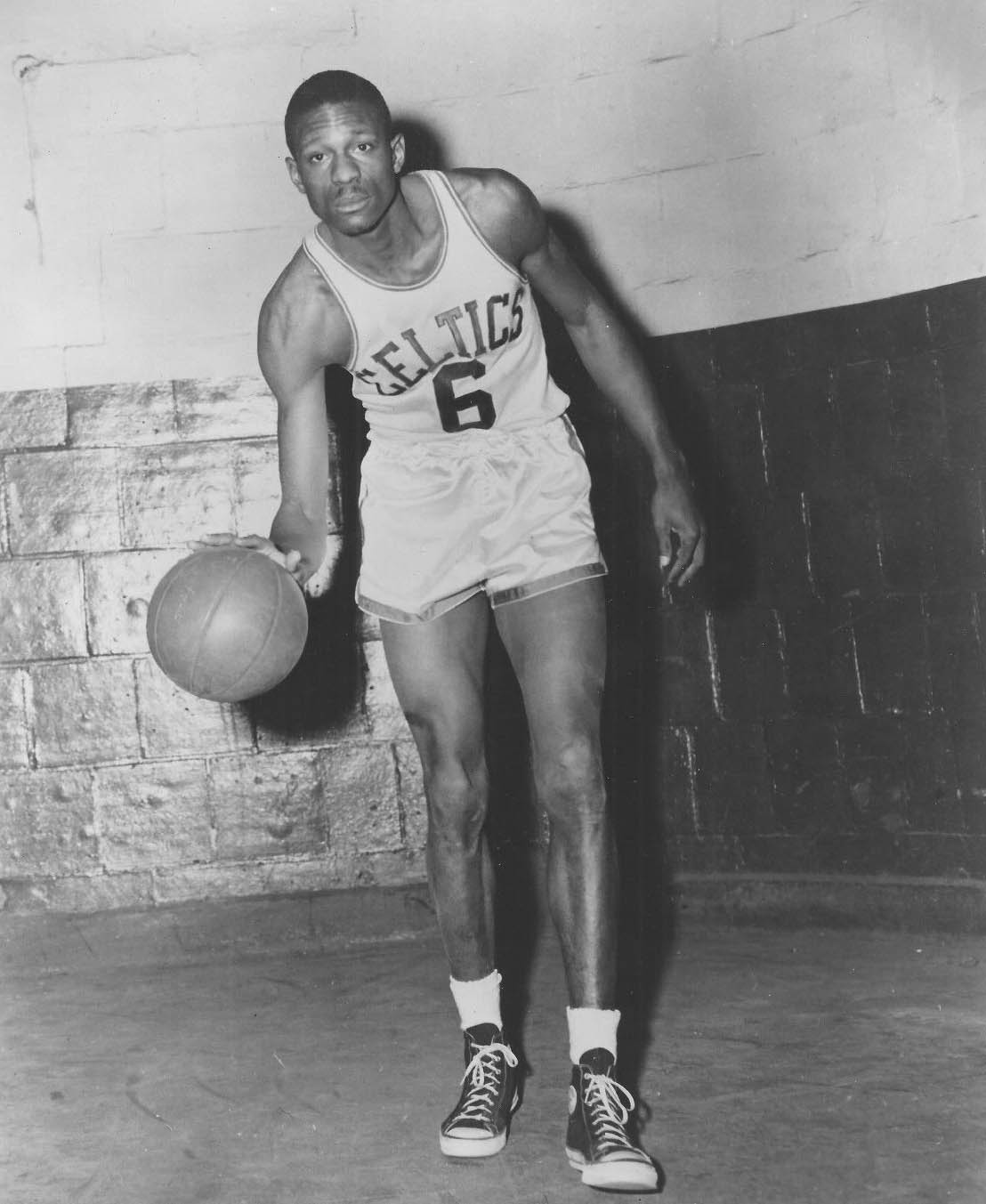
Bill Russell has the most rebounds in NBA playoffs history.

^	Active NBA player
*	Inducted into the Naismith Memorial Basketball Hall of Fame
§	1st time eligible for Hall of Fame in 2025

Statistics accurate as of the 2026 NBA playoffs.

Rank	Player	Position(s)	Playoff team(s) played for (years)	Total rebounds	Games played	Rebounds per game average
1	Bill Russell*	C	Boston Celtics (1957–1969)	4,104	165	24.9
2	Wilt Chamberlain*	C	Philadelphia/San Francisco Warriors (1960–1962, 1964); Philadelphia 76ers (1965–1968); Los Angeles Lakers (1969–1973)	3,913	160	24.5
3	Tim Duncan*	PF/C	San Antonio Spurs (1998–1999, 2001–2016)	2,859	251	11.4
4	LeBron James^	SF	Cleveland Cavaliers (2006–2010, 2015–2018); Miami Heat (2011–2014); Los Angeles Lakers (2020–2021, 2023–2026)	2,695	302	8.9
5	Shaquille O'Neal*	C	Orlando Magic (1994–1996); Los Angeles Lakers (1997–2004); Miami Heat (2005–2007); Phoenix Suns (2008); Cleveland Cavaliers (2010); Boston Celtics (2011)	2,508	216	11.6
6	Kareem Abdul-Jabbar*	C	Milwaukee Bucks (1970–1974); Los Angeles Lakers (1977–1989)	2,481	237	10.5
7	Karl Malone*	PF	Utah Jazz (1986–2003); Los Angeles Lakers (2004)	2,062	193	10.7
8	Wes Unseld*	C	Baltimore/Capital/Washington Bullets (1969–1980)	1,777	119	14.9
9	Robert Parish*	C	Golden State Warriors (1977); Boston Celtics (1981–1993); Charlotte Hornets (1995); Chicago Bulls (1997)	1,765	184	9.6
10	Elgin Baylor*	SF	Minneapolis/Los Angeles Lakers (1959–1970)	1,724	134	12.9
11	Larry Bird*	SF/PF	Boston Celtics (1980–1988, 1990–1992)	1,683	164	10.3
12	Dennis Rodman*	PF/SF	Detroit Pistons (1987–1992); San Antonio Spurs (1994–1995); Chicago Bulls (1996–1998)	1,676	169	9.9
13	Hakeem Olajuwon*	C	Houston Rockets (1985–1991, 1993–1999); Toronto Raptors (2002)	1,621	145	11.2
14	Scottie Pippen*	SF	Chicago Bulls (1988–1998); Houston Rockets (1999); Portland Trail Blazers (2000–2003)	1,583	208	7.6
15	Charles Barkley*	PF	Philadelphia 76ers (1985–1987, 1989–1991); Phoenix Suns (1993–1996); Houston Rockets (1997–1999)	1,582	123	12.9
16	Al Horford^	C	Atlanta Hawks (2008–2013, 2015–2016); Boston Celtics (2017–2019, 2022–2025); Philadelphia 76ers (2020)	1,561	197	7.9
17	Kevin Garnett*	PF	Minnesota Timberwolves (1997–2004); Boston Celtics (2008, 2010–2013); Brooklyn Nets (2014)	1,534	143	10.7
18	Paul Silas	PF	St. Louis/Atlanta Hawks (1965–1969); Phoenix Suns (1970); Boston Celtics (1973–1976); Denver Nuggets (1977); Seattle SuperSonics (1978–1980)	1,527	163	9.4
19	Dwight Howard*	C	Orlando Magic (2007–2011); Los Angeles Lakers (2013, 2020); Houston Rockets (2014–2016); Atlanta Hawks (2017); Philadelphia 76ers (2021)	1,473	125	11.8
20	Magic Johnson*	PG	Los Angeles Lakers (1980–1991, 1996)	1,465	190	7.7
21	Horace Grant	PF	Chicago Bulls (1988–1994); Orlando Magic (1995–1997, 1999, 2002); Seattle SuperSonics (2000); Los Angeles Lakers (2001, 2004)	1,457	170	8.6
21	Draymond Green^	PF	Golden State Warriors (2013–2019, 2022–2023, 2025)	1,457	169	8.6
23	Ben Wallace*	C/PF	Detroit Pistons (2002–2006); Chicago Bulls (2007); Cleveland Cavaliers (2008–2009)	1,454	130	11.2
24	Dirk Nowitzki*	PF	Dallas Mavericks (2001–2012, 2014–2016)	1,446	145	10.0
25	Charles Oakley	PF	Chicago Bulls (1986–1988); New York Knicks (1989–1998); Toronto Raptors (2000–2001)	1,445	144	10.0

== Progressive list of playoff rebound leaders ==
This is a progressive list of rebound leaders showing how the record increased through the years.

Statistics accurate as of the 2026 NBA playoffs.

^	Active NBA player
*	Inducted into the Naismith Memorial Basketball Hall of Fame
§	1st time eligible for Hall of Fame in 2025

Team abbreviationsTeam(s) listed is the one player was on when he established the record.
BAL	Baltimore Bullets	GSW	Golden State Warriors	ORL	Orlando Magic	SEA	Seattle SuperSonics
BOS	Boston Celtics	HOU	Houston Rockets	PHI	Philadelphia 76ers	SFW	San Francisco Warriors
CHO	Charlotte Hornets	LAC	Los Angeles Clippers	PHW	Philadelphia Warriors	SYR	Syracuse Nationals
CHI	Chicago Bulls	LAL	Los Angeles Lakers	PHX	Phoenix Suns	TOR	Toronto Raptors
CLE	Cleveland Cavaliers	MIA	Miami Heat	POR	Portland Trail Blazers	UTA	Utah Jazz
DAL	Dallas Mavericks	MIL	Milwaukee Bucks	ROC	Rochester Royals	WAS	Washington Wizards
DEN	Denver Nuggets	MNL	Minneapolis Lakers	SAS	San Antonio Spurs	WSB	Washington Bullets
DET	Detroit Pistons	NYK	New York Knicks				

Progressive leaders and records for playoff total rebounds
Season	Year-by-year leader	REB	Active player leader	REB	Career record	REB	Single-season record	REB	Season
1950–51	Arnie Risen*ROC	196	Arnie Risen*ROC	196	Arnie Risen*ROC	196	Arnie Risen*ROC	196	1950–51
1951–52	George Mikan*MNL	207	Harry Gallatin*NYK	297	Harry Gallatin*NYK	297	George Mikan*MNL	207	1951–52
1952–53	George Mikan*MNL	185	George Mikan*MNL	466	George Mikan*MNL	466	George Mikan*MNL	207	1952–53
1953–54	George Mikan*MNL	171	George Mikan*MNL	637	George Mikan*MNL	637	George Mikan*MNL	207	1953–54
1954–55	Dolph Schayes*SYR	141	Harry Gallatin*NYK	522	George Mikan*MNL	637	George Mikan*MNL	207	1954–55
1955–56	Neil Johnston*PHW	143	George Mikan*MNL	665	George Mikan*MNL	665	George Mikan*MNL	207	1955–56
1956–57	Bill Russell*BOS	244	Dolph Schayes*SYR	687	Dolph Schayes*SYR	687	Bill Russell*BOS	244	1956–57
1957–58	Bill Russell*BOS	221	Dolph Schayes*SYR	732	Dolph Schayes*SYR	732	Bill Russell*BOS	244	1957–58
1958–59	Bill Russell*BOS	305	Dolph Schayes*SYR	849	Dolph Schayes*SYR	849	Bill Russell*BOS	305	1958–59
1959–60	Bill Russell*BOS	336	Bill Russell*BOS	1,106	Bill Russell*BOS	1,106	Bill Russell*BOS	336	1959–60
1960–61	Bill Russell*BOS	299	Bill Russell*BOS	1,405	Bill Russell*BOS	1,405	Bill Russell*BOS	336	1960–61
1961–62	Bill Russell*BOS	370	Bill Russell*BOS	1,775	Bill Russell*BOS	1,775	Bill Russell*BOS	370	1961–62
1962–63	Bill Russell*BOS	326	Bill Russell*BOS	2,101	Bill Russell*BOS	2,101	Bill Russell*BOS	370	1962–63
1963–64	Wilt Chamberlain*SFW	302	Bill Russell*BOS	2,373	Bill Russell*BOS	2,373	Bill Russell*BOS	370	1963–64
1964–65	Bill Russell*BOS	302	Bill Russell*BOS	2,675	Bill Russell*BOS	2,675	Bill Russell*BOS	370	1964–65
1965–66	Bill Russell*BOS	428	Bill Russell*BOS	3,103	Bill Russell*BOS	3,103	Bill Russell*BOS	428	1965–66
1966–67	Wilt Chamberlain*PHI	437	Bill Russell*BOS	3,301	Bill Russell*BOS	3,301	Wilt Chamberlain*; PHI 1966–67; LAL 1968–69	437	1966–67
1967–68	Bill Russell*BOS	434	Bill Russell*BOS	3,735	Bill Russell*BOS	3,735	Wilt Chamberlain*; PHI 1966–67; LAL 1968–69	437	1967–68
1968–69	Wilt Chamberlain*LAL	444	Bill Russell*BOS	4,104	Bill Russell*BOS	4,104	Wilt Chamberlain*; PHI 1966–67; LAL 1968–69	444	1968–69
1969–70	Wilt Chamberlain*LAL	399	Wilt Chamberlain*LAL	2,973	Bill Russell*BOS	4,104	Wilt Chamberlain*; PHI 1966–67; LAL 1968–69	444	1969–70
1970–71	Wes Unseld*BAL	339	Wilt Chamberlain*LAL	3,215	Bill Russell*BOS	4,104	Wilt Chamberlain*; PHI 1966–67; LAL 1968–69	444	1970–71
1971–72	Wilt Chamberlain*LAL	315	Wilt Chamberlain*LAL	3,530	Bill Russell*BOS	4,104	Wilt Chamberlain*; PHI 1966–67; LAL 1968–69	444	1971–72
1972–73	Wilt Chamberlain*LAL	383	Wilt Chamberlain*LAL	3,913	Bill Russell*BOS	4,104	Wilt Chamberlain*; PHI 1966–67; LAL 1968–69	444	1972–73
1973–74	Kareem Abdul-Jabbar*MIL	253	Bill Bridges; LAL 1974; GSW 1975	1,256	Bill Russell*BOS	4,104	Wilt Chamberlain*; PHI 1966–67; LAL 1968–69	444	1973–74
1974–75	Wes Unseld*WSB	276	Bill Bridges; LAL 1974; GSW 1975	1,305	Bill Russell*BOS	4,104	Wilt Chamberlain*; PHI 1966–67; LAL 1968–69	444	1974–75
1975–76	Dave Cowens*BOS	296	Wes Unseld*WSB	1,175	Bill Russell*BOS	4,104	Wilt Chamberlain*; PHI 1966–67; LAL 1968–69	444	1975–76
1976–77	Bill Walton*POR	288	Wes Unseld*WSB	1,280	Bill Russell*BOS	4,104	Wilt Chamberlain*; PHI 1966–67; LAL 1968–69	444	1976–77
1977–78	Marvin WebsterSEA	289	Wes Unseld*WSB	1,496	Bill Russell*BOS	4,104	Wilt Chamberlain*; PHI 1966–67; LAL 1968–69	444	1977–78
1978–79	Elvin Hayes*WSB	266	Wes Unseld*WSB	1,749	Bill Russell*BOS	4,104	Wilt Chamberlain*; PHI 1966–67; LAL 1968–69	444	1978–79
1979–80	Caldwell JonesPHI	185	Wes Unseld*WSB	1,777	Bill Russell*BOS	4,104	Wilt Chamberlain*; PHI 1966–67; LAL 1968–69	444	1979–80
1980–81	Moses Malone*HOU	305	Wes Unseld*WSB	1,777	Bill Russell*BOS	4,104	Wilt Chamberlain*; PHI 1966–67; LAL 1968–69	444	1980–81
1981–82	Caldwell JonesPHI	189	Kareem Abdul-Jabbar*LAL	1,643	Bill Russell*BOS	4,104	Wilt Chamberlain*; PHI 1966–67; LAL 1968–69	444	1981–82
1982–83	Moses Malone*PHI	206	Kareem Abdul-Jabbar*LAL	1,758	Bill Russell*BOS	4,104	Wilt Chamberlain*; PHI 1966–67; LAL 1968–69	444	1982–83
1983–84	Larry Bird*BOS	252	Kareem Abdul-Jabbar*LAL	1,931	Bill Russell*BOS	4,104	Wilt Chamberlain*; PHI 1966–67; LAL 1968–69	444	1983–84
1984–85	Robert Parish*BOS	219	Kareem Abdul-Jabbar*LAL	2,085	Bill Russell*BOS	4,104	Wilt Chamberlain*; PHI 1966–67; LAL 1968–69	444	1984–85
1985–86	Hakeem Olajuwon*HOU	236	Kareem Abdul-Jabbar*LAL	2,168	Bill Russell*BOS	4,104	Wilt Chamberlain*; PHI 1966–67; LAL 1968–69	444	1985–86
1986–87	Larry Bird*BOS	231	Kareem Abdul-Jabbar*LAL	2,291	Bill Russell*BOS	4,104	Wilt Chamberlain*; PHI 1966–67; LAL 1968–69	444	1986–87
1987–88	Bill LaimbeerDET	221	Kareem Abdul-Jabbar*LAL	2,422	Bill Russell*BOS	4,104	Wilt Chamberlain*; PHI 1966–67; LAL 1968–69	444	1987–88
1988–89	Dennis Rodman*DET	170	Kareem Abdul-Jabbar*LAL	2,481	Bill Russell*BOS	4,104	Wilt Chamberlain*; PHI 1966–67; LAL 1968–69	444	1988–89
1989–90	Bill LaimbeerDET	211	Larry Bird*BOS	1,593	Bill Russell*BOS	4,104	Wilt Chamberlain*; PHI 1966–67; LAL 1968–69	444	1989–90
1990–91	Dennis Rodman*DET	177	Larry Bird*BOS	1,665	Bill Russell*BOS	4,104	Wilt Chamberlain*; PHI 1966–67; LAL 1968–69	444	1990–91
1991–92	Horace GrantCHI	194	Robert Parish*; BOS 1991–94; CHO 1994–96; CHI 1996–97	1,714	Bill Russell*BOS	4,104	Wilt Chamberlain*; PHI 1966–67; LAL 1968–69	444	1991–92
1992–93	Charles Barkley*PHX	326	Robert Parish*; BOS 1991–94; CHO 1994–96; CHI 1996–97	1,752	Bill Russell*BOS	4,104	Wilt Chamberlain*; PHI 1966–67; LAL 1968–69	444	1992–93
1993–94	Patrick Ewing*NYK	293	Robert Parish*; BOS 1991–94; CHO 1994–96; CHI 1996–97	1,752	Bill Russell*BOS	4,104	Wilt Chamberlain*; PHI 1966–67; LAL 1968–69	444	1993–94
1994–95	Shaquille O'Neal*ORL	250	Robert Parish*; BOS 1991–94; CHO 1994–96; CHI 1996–97	1,761	Bill Russell*BOS	4,104	Wilt Chamberlain*; PHI 1966–67; LAL 1968–69	444	1994–95
1995–96	Dennis Rodman*CHI	247	Robert Parish*; BOS 1991–94; CHO 1994–96; CHI 1996–97	1,761	Bill Russell*BOS	4,104	Wilt Chamberlain*; PHI 1966–67; LAL 1968–69	444	1995–96
1996–97	Karl Malone*UTA	228	Robert Parish*; BOS 1991–94; CHO 1994–96; CHI 1996–97	1,765	Bill Russell*BOS	4,104	Wilt Chamberlain*; PHI 1966–67; LAL 1968–69	444	1996–97
1997–98	Dennis Rodman*CHI	248	Dennis Rodman*CHI	1,676	Bill Russell*BOS	4,104	Wilt Chamberlain*; PHI 1966–67; LAL 1968–69	444	1997–98
1998–99	Tim Duncan*SAS	195	Karl Malone*; UTA 1998–03; LAL 2003–04	1,680	Bill Russell*BOS	4,104	Wilt Chamberlain*; PHI 1966–67; LAL 1968–69	444	1998–99
1999–00	Shaquille O'Neal*LAL	355	Karl Malone*; UTA 1998–03; LAL 2003–04	1,769	Bill Russell*BOS	4,104	Wilt Chamberlain*; PHI 1966–67; LAL 1968–69	444	1999–00
2000–01	Dikembe Mutombo*PHI	316	Karl Malone*; UTA 1998–03; LAL 2003–04	1,813	Bill Russell*BOS	4,104	Wilt Chamberlain*; PHI 1966–67; LAL 1968–69	444	2000–01
2001–02	Shaquille O'Neal*LAL	239	Karl Malone*; UTA 1998–03; LAL 2003–04	1,843	Bill Russell*BOS	4,104	Wilt Chamberlain*; PHI 1966–67; LAL 1968–69	444	2001–02
2002–03	Tim Duncan*SAS	369	Karl Malone*; UTA 1998–03; LAL 2003–04	1,877	Bill Russell*BOS	4,104	Wilt Chamberlain*; PHI 1966–67; LAL 1968–69	444	2002–03
2003–04	Ben Wallace*DET	328	Karl Malone*; UTA 1998–03; LAL 2003–04	2,062	Bill Russell*BOS	4,104	Wilt Chamberlain*; PHI 1966–67; LAL 1968–69	444	2003–04
2004–05	Tim Duncan*SAS	286	Shaquille O'Neal*; MIA 2004–07; PHX 2008–09; CLE 2010; BOS 2011	2,142	Bill Russell*BOS	4,104	Wilt Chamberlain*; PHI 1966–67; LAL 1968–69	444	2004–05
2005–06	Dirk Nowitzki*DAL	268	Shaquille O'Neal*; MIA 2004–07; PHX 2008–09; CLE 2010; BOS 2011	2,367	Bill Russell*BOS	4,104	Wilt Chamberlain*; PHI 1966–67; LAL 1968–69	444	2005–06
2006–07	Tim Duncan*SAS	229	Shaquille O'Neal*; MIA 2004–07; PHX 2008–09; CLE 2010; BOS 2011	2,401	Bill Russell*BOS	4,104	Wilt Chamberlain*; PHI 1966–67; LAL 1968–69	444	2006–07
2007–08	Kevin Garnett*BOS	274	Shaquille O'Neal*; MIA 2004–07; PHX 2008–09; CLE 2010; BOS 2011	2,447	Bill Russell*BOS	4,104	Wilt Chamberlain*; PHI 1966–67; LAL 1968–69	444	2007–08
2008–09	Dwight Howard*ORL	353	Shaquille O'Neal*; MIA 2004–07; PHX 2008–09; CLE 2010; BOS 2011	2,447	Bill Russell*BOS	4,104	Wilt Chamberlain*; PHI 1966–67; LAL 1968–69	444	2008–09
2009–10	Pau Gasol*LAL	255	Shaquille O'Neal*; MIA 2004–07; PHX 2008–09; CLE 2010; BOS 2011	2,508	Bill Russell*BOS	4,104	Wilt Chamberlain*; PHI 1966–67; LAL 1968–69	444	2009–10
2010–11	Tyson ChandlerDAL	193	Shaquille O'Neal*; MIA 2004–07; PHX 2008–09; CLE 2010; BOS 2011	2,508	Bill Russell*BOS	4,104	Wilt Chamberlain*; PHI 1966–67; LAL 1968–69	444	2010–11
2011–12	LeBron James^MIA	224	Tim Duncan*SAS	2,308	Bill Russell*BOS	4,104	Wilt Chamberlain*; PHI 1966–67; LAL 1968–69	444	2011–12
2012–13	Tim Duncan*SAS	214	Tim Duncan*SAS	2,522	Bill Russell*BOS	4,104	Wilt Chamberlain*; PHI 1966–67; LAL 1968–69	444	2012–13
2013–14	Tim Duncan*SAS	211	Tim Duncan*SAS	2,733	Bill Russell*BOS	4,104	Wilt Chamberlain*; PHI 1966–67; LAL 1968–69	444	2013–14
2014–15	Dwight Howard*HOU	238	Tim Duncan*SAS	2,811	Bill Russell*BOS	4,104	Wilt Chamberlain*; PHI 1966–67; LAL 1968–69	444	2014–15
2015–16	Draymond Green^GSW	228	Tim Duncan*SAS	2,859	Bill Russell*BOS	4,104	Wilt Chamberlain*; PHI 1966–67; LAL 1968–69	444	2015–16
2016–17	Kevin Love^CLE	191	LeBron James^ CLE 2016–18; LAL 2018–26	1,922	Bill Russell*BOS	4,104	Wilt Chamberlain*; PHI 1966–67; LAL 1968–69	444	2016–17
2017–18	Draymond Green^GSW	222	LeBron James^ CLE 2016–18; LAL 2018–26	2,122	Bill Russell*BOS	4,104	Wilt Chamberlain*; PHI 1966–67; LAL 1968–69	444	2017–18
2018–19	Draymond Green^GSW	223	LeBron James^ CLE 2016–18; LAL 2018–26	2,122	Bill Russell*BOS	4,104	Wilt Chamberlain*; PHI 1966–67; LAL 1968–69	444	2018–19
2019–20	LeBron James^LAL	226	LeBron James^ CLE 2016–18; LAL 2018–26	2,348	Bill Russell*BOS	4,104	Wilt Chamberlain*; PHI 1966–67; LAL 1968–69	444	2019–20
2020–21	Giannis Antetokounmpo^MIL	269	LeBron James^ CLE 2016–18; LAL 2018–26	2,391	Bill Russell*BOS	4,104	Wilt Chamberlain*; PHI 1966–67; LAL 1968–69	444	2020–21
2021–22	Al Horford^BOS	214	LeBron James^ CLE 2016–18; LAL 2018–26	2,391	Bill Russell*BOS	4,104	Wilt Chamberlain*; PHI 1966–67; LAL 1968–69	444	2021–22
2022–23	Nikola Jokić^DEN	269	LeBron James^ CLE 2016–18; LAL 2018–26	2,549	Bill Russell*BOS	4,104	Wilt Chamberlain*; PHI 1966–67; LAL 1968–69	444	2022–23
2023–24	Luka Dončić^DAL	208	LeBron James^ CLE 2016–18; LAL 2018–26	2,583	Bill Russell*BOS	4,104	Wilt Chamberlain*; PHI 1966–67; LAL 1968–69	444	2023–24
2024–25	Karl-Anthony Towns^NYK	209	LeBron James^ CLE 2016–18; LAL 2018–26	2,628	Bill Russell*BOS	4,104	Wilt Chamberlain*; PHI 1966–67; LAL 1968–69	444	2024–25
2025–26	Victor Wembanyama^SAS	239	LeBron James^ CLE 2016–18; LAL 2018–26	2,695	Bill Russell*BOS	4,104	Wilt Chamberlain*; PHI 1966–67; LAL 1968–69	444	2025–26
Season	Year-by-year leader	REB	Active player leader	REB	Career record	REB	Single-season record	REB	Season

== See also ==
- Basketball statistics
- NBA post-season records
