= Bill Hewitt (basketball) =

American basketball player (1944–2026)

Personal information
- Born: August 8, 1944 Cambridge, Massachusetts, U.S.
- Died: July 27, 2026 (aged 81) San Antonio, Texas, U.S.
- Listed height: 6 ft 7 in (2.01 m)
- Listed weight: 210 lb (95 kg)

Career information
- High school: Rindge Technical (Cambridge, Massachusetts)
- College: Mt. SAC (1964–1966); USC (1966–1968)
- NBA draft: 1968: 1st round, 11th overall pick
- Drafted by: Los Angeles Lakers
- Playing career: 1968–1974
- Position: Small forward
- Number: 30, 31, 27

Career history
- 1968–1969: Los Angeles Lakers
- 1969–1972: Detroit Pistons
- 1972–1973: Buffalo Braves
- 1974: Chicago Bulls

Career highlights
- NBA All-Rookie First Team (1969); 2× First-team All-AAWU (1967, 1968)

Career NBA statistics
- Points: 2,062 (5.7 ppg)
- Rebounds: 1,994 (5.5 rpg)
- Assists: 469 (1.3 apg)
- Stats at NBA.com
- Stats at Basketball Reference

William Severlyn Hewitt (August 8, 1944–July 27, 2026) was an American professional basketball player.

A 6'7" small forward from the University of Southern California, Hewitt played six seasons (1968–1973; 1974–1975) in the National Basketball Association (NBA) as a member of the Los Angeles Lakers, Detroit Pistons, Buffalo Braves, and Chicago Bulls. He earned NBA All-Rookie Team honors during the 1968–69 NBA season after averaging 7.2 points per game for the Lakers.

== Career statistics ==
Legend
| GP | Games played | GS | Games started | MPG | Minutes per game |
| FG% | Field goal percentage | 3P% | 3-point field goal percentage | FT% | Free throw percentage |
| RPG | Rebounds per game | APG | Assists per game | SPG | Steals per game |
| BPG | Blocks per game | PPG | Points per game | **Bold** | Career high |

=== NBA ===
==== Regular season ====
| Year | Team | GP | GS | MPG | FG% | FT% | RPG | APG | SPG | BPG | PPG |
|---|---|---|---|---|---|---|---|---|---|---|---|
| 1968–69 | L.A. Lakers | **75** | | 19.4 | .453 | .575 | 4.4 | 1.0 | | | 7.2 |
| 1969–70 | L.A. Lakers | 20 | | 23.9 | .284 | .516 | 7.1 | 1.4 | | | 3.3 |
| 1969–70 | Detroit | 45 | | 17.8 | .405 | .603 | 4.7 | .8 | | | 4.6 |
| 1970–71 | Detroit | 62 | | **27.8** | .467 | .575 | **7.3** | **2.0** | | | **7.7** |
| 1971–72 | Detroit | 68 | | 17.7 | **.473** | .500 | 5.4 | 1.0 | | | 4.5 |
| 1972–73 | Buffalo | 73 | | 18.2 | .418 | .554 | 5.0 | 1.5 | | | 4.7 |
| 1974–75 | Chicago | 18 | 9 | 25.9 | .434 | **.609** | 6.4 | 1.3 | .5 | .6 | 7.0 |
| Career | | 361 | 9 | 20.7 | .439 | .561 | 5.5 | 1.3 | .5 | .6 | 5.7 |

==== Playoffs ====
| Year | Team | GP | MPG | FG% | FT% | RPG | APG | PPG |
|---|---|---|---|---|---|---|---|---|
| 1969 | L.A. Lakers | 15 | 27.5 | .404 | .621 | 5.2 | 1.1 | 9.3 |
