= Bobby Lewis (basketball, born 1945) =

American basketball player

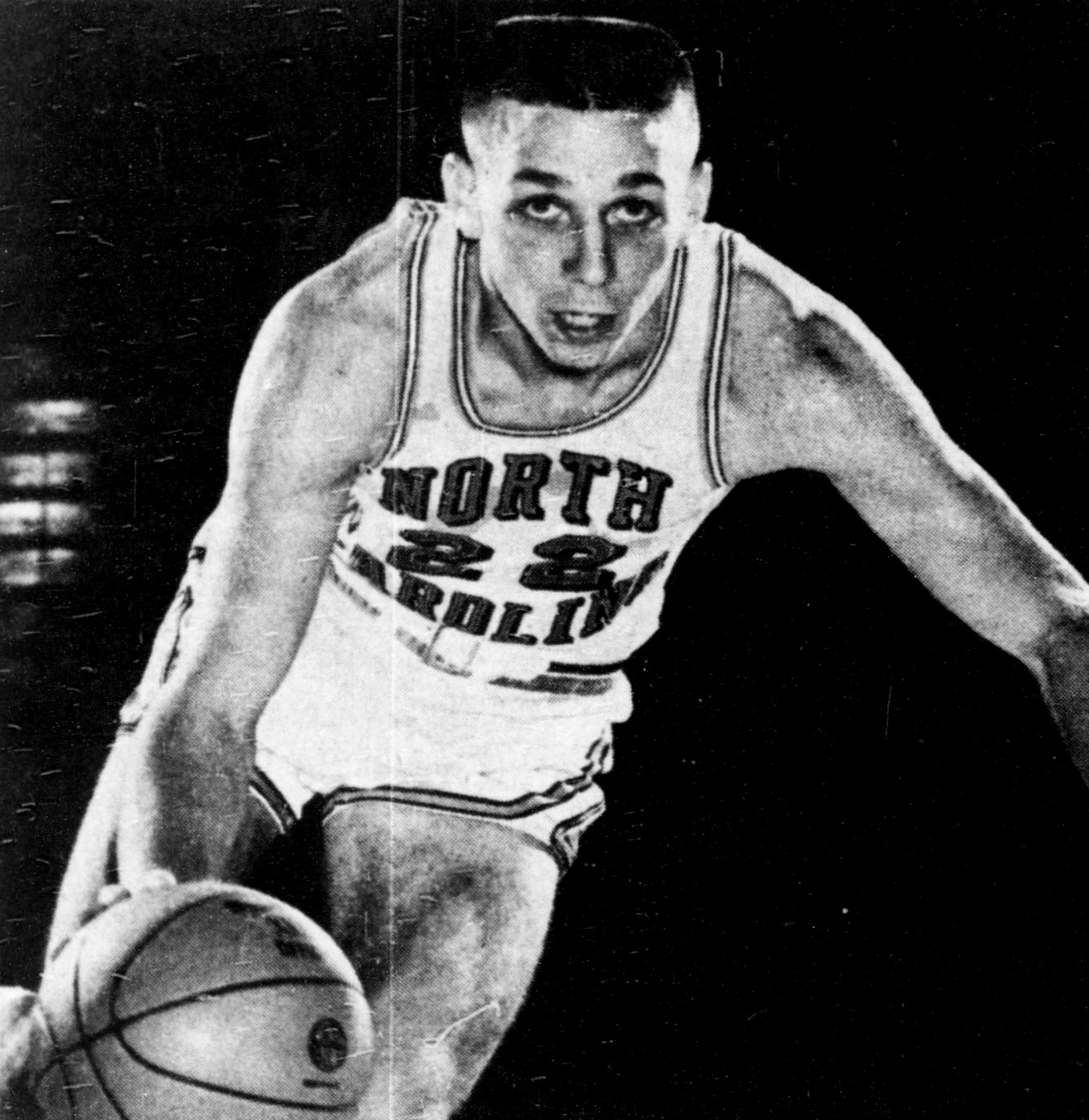
- Lewis, circa 1965

Personal information
- Born: March 20, 1945 (age 81) Washington, D.C., U.S.
- Listed height: 6 ft 3 in (1.91 m)
- Listed weight: 175 lb (79 kg)

Career information
- High school: St. John's College HS (Washington, D.C.)
- College: North Carolina (1964–1967)
- NBA draft: 1967: 4th round, 39th overall pick
- Drafted by: San Francisco Warriors
- Playing career: 1967–1971
- Position: Shooting guard
- Number: 15, 5

Career history
- 1967–1970: San Francisco Warriors
- 1970–1971: Cleveland Cavaliers

Career highlights
- 2× Third-team All-American – NABC (1966, 1967); Third-team All-American – AP (1966); 2× First-team All-ACC (1966, 1967); Second-team All-ACC (1965); First-team Parade All-American (1963)

Career NBA statistics
- Points: 1,481 (5.8 ppg)
- Rebounds: 533 (2.1 rpg)
- Assists: 555 (2.2 apg)
- Stats at NBA.com
- Stats at Basketball Reference

Robert Franklin Lewis (born March 20, 1945) is an American former professional basketball player.

Lewis grew up in Northwest Washington, D.C., and developed many of his skills at Jelleff's Boys Club in Georgetown, under the tutelage of Joe Branzell.

He attended St. John's College High School in Washington, D.C, where he played for coach Joe Gallagher.

As a junior, Lewis averaged 25.4 points per game, including a season-high 40 points against the Georgetown freshman team. He was named first team All-Met.

As a senior, he was named the Daily News SSA Player of the Year and First Team All-Met for the second consecutive year. He also appeared on The Ed Sullivan Show as a Parade Magazine All-American in 1963.

He went on to play for coach Dean Smith at the University of North Carolina, where he played an integral role on the 1967 ACC Champion and Final Four team. In 1966, he averaged 27.4 points per game, the second-highest single-season average in UNC history. On December 16, 1965, he scored 49 points against Florida State, which remains the highest single-game scoring total in school history. Lewis currently ranks tenth all-time in scoring at UNC, with 1,836 career points.

He was an All-ACC and All-America selection in 1966 and 1967. Because of his national accolades, Lewis' number 22 was honored by the University of North Carolina and hangs in the rafters of the Dean Smith Center.

Lewis was selected by the San Francisco Warriors in the fourth round (39th pick overall) of the 1967 NBA draft. He was also selected by the Anaheim Amigos in the 1967 ABA Draft.

He played for the Warriors for three seasons and the Cleveland Cavaliers for one. During his professional career, he averaged 5.8 points, 2.1 rebounds, and 2.2 assists per game.

== Career statistics ==
Legend
GP	Games played	GS	Games started	MPG	Minutes per game
FG%	Field goal percentage	3P%	3-point field goal percentage	FT%	Free throw percentage
RPG	Rebounds per game	APG	Assists per game	SPG	Steals per game
BPG	Blocks per game	PPG	Points per game	**Bold**	Career high

=== NBA ===
==== Regular season ====
Year	Team	GP	MPG	FG%	FT%	RPG	APG	PPG
1967–68	San Francisco	41	8.3	**.391**	**.772**	1.4	1.0	4.4
1968–69	San Francisco	62	12.2	.390	.735	1.8	1.2	5.0
1969–70	San Francisco	73	18.5	.382	.658	2.2	2.7	**7.2**
1970–71	Cleveland	**79**	**23.4**	.370	.717	**2.6**	**3.1**	5.9
Career		255	16.9	.381	.712	2.1	2.2	5.8

==== Playoffs ====
Year	Team	GP	MPG	FG%	FT%	RPG	APG	PPG
1968	San Francisco	1	4.0	**.667**	–	.0	.0	4.0
1969	San Francisco	**5**	**11.8**	.393	**.333**	**1.0**	**1.2**	**4.6**
Career		6	10.5	.419	.333	.8	1.0	4.5
