= Jim King (basketball, born 1941) =

American basketball player-coach

Personal information
- Born: February 7, 1941 (age 85) Branch, Arkansas, U.S.
- Listed height: 6 ft 2 in (1.88 m)
- Listed weight: 175 lb (79 kg)

Career information
- High school: Fort Smith (Fort Smith, Arkansas)
- College: Tulsa (1960–1963)
- NBA draft: 1963: 2nd round, 13th overall pick
- Drafted by: Los Angeles Lakers
- Playing career: 1963–1973
- Position: Point guard
- Number: 24, 21, 17
- Coaching career: 1973–1980

Career history

Playing
- 1963–1966: Los Angeles Lakers
- 1966–1969: San Francisco Warriors
- 1969–1970: Cincinnati Royals
- 1970–1973: Chicago Bulls

Coaching
- 1973–1975: Athletes in Action
- 1975–1980: Tulsa

Career highlights
- NBA All-Star (1968); 2× First-team All-MVC (1962, 1963); No. 24 retired by Tulsa Golden Hurricane

Career NBA statistics
- Points: 4,377 (7.2 ppg)
- Rebounds: 1,500 (2.5 rpg)
- Assists: 1,412 (2.3 apg)
- Stats at NBA.com
- Stats at Basketball Reference

James Staton "Country" King (born February 7, 1941) is an American retired professional basketball player and former college coach.

A 6'2" guard from the University of Tulsa, King was selected by the Los Angeles Lakers in the second round of the 1963 NBA draft. King played 10 NBA seasons (1963–1973) with four teams: the Lakers, the San Francisco Warriors, the Cincinnati Royals, and the Chicago Bulls. He represented the Warriors in the 1968 NBA All-Star Game, and he retired with 4,377 career points.

King later coached the Tulsa Golden Hurricane from 1975 to midway through the 1979–1980 season, when he resigned after 4 1/2 seasons. The school retired his jersey number 24, and in 1984, he was inducted into the University of Tulsa Hall of Fame.

== NBA career ==
In Los Angeles, King played much of his first three seasons behind former UCLA teammates Gail Goodrich and Walt Hazzard, after which the Lakers left him unprotected in the expansion draft. No sooner were he and Jeff Mullins claimed by Chicago on May 1, 1966, than they were traded to San Francisco in return for All-Star guard Guy Rodgers. The move proved to be a fortuitous one for both players, as they were instrumental in the Warriors' drive to the 1966–67 Western Division title. On April 18, 1967, King (28 points) and superstar teammate Rick Barry (55) combined for 83 points in Game 3 of the NBA Finals, a 130–124 victory over the Philadelphia 76ers. Only the Lakers tandem of Elgin Baylor (61) and Jerry West (26) had scored more in a championship series game.

King was even better in the 1967–68 season, when he emerged as one of the best combo guards in the league. Despite the absence of Barry, who had jumped to the rival ABA in the off-season, the Warriors picked up where they left off, only this time with King in a lead role. In his first 15 games, he ranked among the NBA scoring leaders at 24.2 points per game. He also averaged 4.9 assists and 4.7 rebounds in that span. King suffered a knee injury which a short time later would reduce his effectiveness. Nonetheless, he was selected to play with the West team in the 1968 All-Star Game in New York. In a 144–124 loss, he had four points and two assists off the bench.

Prior to the 1969–70 campaign, King and Bill Turner were traded to the Cincinnati Royals in return for Jerry Lucas. But, King saw action in only 31 games because of knee problems. He signed with Chicago one year later and played his final three seasons off the bench there.

== NBA career statistics ==
Legend
GP	Games played	GS	Games started	MPG	Minutes per game
FG%	Field goal percentage	3P%	3-point field goal percentage	FT%	Free throw percentage
RPG	Rebounds per game	APG	Assists per game	SPG	Steals per game
BPG	Blocks per game	PPG	Points per game	**Bold**	Career high

=== Regular season ===
Year	Team	GP	MPG	FG%	FT%	RPG	APG	PPG
1963–64	L.A. Lakers	60	12.7	.424	.653	1.9	1.8	3.9
1964–65	L.A. Lakers	77	21.7	.392	.781	2.8	2.3	6.3
1965–66	L.A. Lakers	76	19.7	.437	.817	2.7	2.9	7.5
1966–67	San Francisco	67	24.9	.418	.787	4.8	3.6	11.1
1967–68	San Francisco	54	32.3	.425	.810	4.5	**4.2**	**16.6**
1968–69	San Francisco	46	22.0	.348	.722	2.6	2.7	7.7
1969–70	San Francisco	3	**35.0**	.413	.786	5.3	3.3	16.3
1969–70	Cincinnati	31	9.2	.410	.815	1.5	1.4	2.9
1970–71	Chicago	55	11.7	.439	.810	1.2	1.4	4.8
1971–72	Chicago	73	13.9	**.455**	.788	1.1	1.4	5.7
1972–73	Chicago	65	12.1	.441	**.846**	1.2	1.2	4.2
Career		607	18.4	.418	.782	2.5	2.3	7.2
All-Star		1	7.0	.250	.667	1.0	2.0	4.0

=== Playoffs ===
Year	Team	GP	MPG	FG%	FT%	RPG	APG	PPG
1964	L.A. Lakers	4	12.8	.400	**1.000**	1.0	1.5	3.0
1965	L.A. Lakers	11	16.7	.444	.882	3.3	2.2	6.5
1966	L.A. Lakers	13	22.1	.417	.706	2.5	2.4	6.3
1967	San Francisco	**15**	**30.5**	**.472**	.690	**6.7**	3.3	**16.3**
1968	San Francisco	9	12.6	.421	.632	2.1	2.2	4.9
1969	San Francisco	6	23.7	.372	.778	4.2	2.8	12.0
1971	Chicago	7	21.0	.422	.667	3.0	**3.9**	6.6
1972	Chicago	4	14.0	.458	**1.000**	1.5	1.3	6.5
1973	Chicago	4	3.5	.333	.500	.3	.5	1.3
Career		73	19.9	.436	.728	3.4	2.5	8.2

== Head coaching record ==
Record table
Season	Team	Overall	Conference	Standing	Postseason
Tulsa Golden Hurricane (Missouri Valley Conference) (1975–1980)
1975–76	Tulsa	9–18	4–8	T–4th	
1976–77	Tulsa	6–21	3–9	7th	
1977–78	Tulsa	9–18	7–9	6th	
1978–79	Tulsa	13–14	7–9	7th	
1979–80	Tulsa	6–12	2–6		
Tulsa:		43–83 (.341)	23–41 (.359)		
Total:		43–83 (.341)			
