= Joe Ellis (basketball) =

American basketball player

Personal information
- Born: May 3, 1944 (age 82) Oakland, California, U.S.
- Listed height: 6 ft 6 in (1.98 m)
- Listed weight: 175 lb (79 kg)

Career information
- High school: McClymonds (Oakland, California)
- College: San Francisco (1963–1966)
- NBA draft: 1966: 2nd round, 13th overall pick
- Drafted by: San Francisco Warriors
- Playing career: 1966–1975
- Position: Small forward / shooting guard
- Number: 31

Career history
- 1966–1974: San Francisco / Golden State Warriors
- 1975: Belgium Lions

Career highlights
- No. 31 retired by San Francisco Dons; California Mr. Basketball (1962)

Career NBA statistics
- Points: 4,623 (8.8 ppg)
- Rebounds: 2,686 (5.1 rpg)
- Assists: 716 (1.4 apg)
- Stats at NBA.com
- Stats at Basketball Reference

Joseph Franklin Ellis (born May 3, 1944) is an American former professional basketball player who played eight seasons in the NBA for the Warriors (first in San Francisco then in Oakland). He played college basketball for the San Francisco Dons.

== High school career ==
Ellis attended McClymonds High School in Oakland, from 1960 to 1962 he was a member of three Tournament of Champions teams. He made the All Tournament Team in both his varsity years and in his senior year was named the All Tournament Most Valuable Player. He was also selected to the All City Teams and in 1962 was named the Northern California Player of the year.

== College career ==
Ellis stayed in state for his collegiate career, joining the University of San Francisco. He played for the Dons from 1963 to 1966, being part of First Team All Conference teams each year. He was named Northern California Player of the Year and also received an All American honorable mention. He was one of four juniors chosen in 1965 to represent the United States in the World University Games. Scoring 1,120 points for the team (third all-time best) he was inducted into the USF Hall of Fame in 1973 and named one of 75 "Legends of the Hilltop" in 2006 for the 150th anniversary of the university. In 2020, USF retired Ellis' number 31.

== Professional career ==
Ellis was selected by the San Francisco Warriors in the second round (13th pick overall) of the 1966 NBA draft. He played eight seasons in the NBA for his hometown club (who relocated to Oakland in 1971), posting 4,825 points at an average of 8.6 per game (and 5.0 rebounds per game). He held double-figure scoring averages in three successive seasons, including averages of 15.8 points per game during the 1969–70 season.

He played for the Belgium Lions of the European Professional Basketball League in 1975.

== Career statistics ==
Legend
GP	Games played	GS	Games started	MPG	Minutes per game
FG%	Field goal percentage	3P%	3-point field goal percentage	FT%	Free throw percentage
RPG	Rebounds per game	APG	Assists per game	SPG	Steals per game
BPG	Blocks per game	PPG	Points per game	**Bold**	Career high

=== NBA ===
==== Regular season ====
Year	Team	GP	MPG	FG%	FT%	RPG	APG	STL	BLK	PPG
1966–67	San Francisco	41	8.1	.409	**.760**	2.7	.7			3.7
1967–68	San Francisco	51	12.2	.368	.640	3.8	.7			5.0
1968–69	San Francisco	74	23.4	.395	.731	6.5	1.8			12.0
1969–70	San Francisco	76	**31.3**	.410	.741	**7.8**	1.8			**15.8**
1970–71	San Francisco	**80**	28.4	.396	.744	6.4	**2.0**			10.8
1971–72	Golden State	78	18.7	**.411**	.720	5.0	1.2			8.2
1972–73	Golden State	74	14.2	.409	.742	3.8	1.2			6.3
1973–74	Golden State	50	10.3	.321	.581	2.4	.7	.7	.2	2.8
Career		524	19.8	.398	.727	5.1	1.4	.7	.2	8.8

==== Playoffs ====
Year	Team	GP	MPG	FG%	FT%	RPG	APG	PPG
1967	San Francisco	3	2.0	.250	–	.3	.7	.7
1968	San Francisco	9	11.6	.295	**.857**	2.1	**.8**	3.6
1969	San Francisco	6	**26.8**	.291	.640	**8.5**	.5	10.3
1971	San Francisco	5	18.2	.310	.667	4.2	.0	5.6
1972	Golden State	5	22.6	**.333**	.706	4.2	**.8**	**10.8**
1973	Golden State	**10**	10.0	.316	–	1.8	.7	2.4
Career		38	15.1	.307	.692	3.4	.6	5.3
