= 1969 NBA playoffs =

Postseason tournament

Tournament details
- Dates: March 26–May 5, 1969
- Season: 1968–69
- Teams: 8

Final positions
- Champions: Boston Celtics (11th title)
- Runner-up: Los Angeles Lakers
- Semifinalists: Atlanta Hawks; New York Knicks

The 1969 NBA playoffs was the postseason tournament of the National Basketball Association's 1968–69 season. The tournament concluded with the Eastern Division champion Boston Celtics defeating the Western Division champion Los Angeles Lakers 4 games to 3 in the NBA Finals.

Despite finishing in 4th place, the Celtics won their second straight NBA title, marking their 11th overall as their era of 1960s dominance drew to a close. They upset Philadelphia and New York on the way to the Finals. Out west, the San Francisco Warriors stunned the Lakers by winning the first two in Southern California and Bay Area fans were thinking of avenging the prior year's sweep by the Lakers with a sweep of their own. But the Lakers won 4 straight to win the series in 6.

This year marked the debut of the NBA Finals Most Valuable Player Award; it was awarded to Jerry West of the Lakers, which marks the only time so far that the trophy has been given to a player on the losing team.

The Celtics were the first team seeded below third in their conference or division to win the NBA championship. It would not happen again until the 1995 NBA playoffs.

The second-year San Diego Rockets made their first playoff appearance; the next time they appeared was in 1975 as the Houston Rockets.

== Bracket ==
Division Semifinals
E1	Baltimore*	0
E3	New York	4
Eastern Division
E4	Boston	4
E2	Philadelphia	1
W1	Los Angeles*	4
W3	San Francisco	2
Western Division
W4	San Diego	2
W2	Atlanta	4

Division Finals
E3	New York	2
E4	Boston	4
W1	Los Angeles*	4
W2	Atlanta	1

NBA Finals
E4	Boston	4
W1	Los Angeles	3

- * Division winner
- Bold Series winner
- Italic Team with home-court advantage in NBA Finals

== Division Semifinals ==
=== Eastern Division Semifinals ===
==== (1) Baltimore Bullets vs. (3) New York Knicks ====
March 27

Boxscore

New York Knicks 113, Baltimore Bullets 101
Scoring by quarter: 22–21, 32–23, 30–28, 29–29
Pts: Walt Frazier 26; Rebs: Dave DeBusschere 21; Asts: Walt Frazier 11	Pts: Earl Monroe 32; Rebs: Wes Unseld 13; Asts: Monroe, Unseld 3 each
New York leads series, 1–0

Baltimore Civic Center, Baltimore, Maryland
Attendance: 11,941

March 29

Boxscore

Baltimore Bullets 91, New York Knicks 107
Scoring by quarter: 29–30, 20–23, 28–31, 14–23
Pts: Earl Monroe 29; Rebs: Wes Unseld 27; Asts: Kevin Loughery 4	Pts: Dick Barnett 27; Rebs: Dave DeBusschere 19; Asts: Walt Frazier 12
New York leads series, 2–0

Madison Square Garden, New York City, New York
Attendance: 19,500

March 30

Boxscore

New York Knicks 119, Baltimore Bullets 116
Scoring by quarter: 38–32, 24–28, 25–31, 32–25
Pts: Willis Reed 35; Rebs: Willis Reed 19; Asts: Walt Frazier 17	Pts: Kevin Loughery 29; Rebs: Wes Unseld 14; Asts: Kevin Loughery 7
New York leads series, 3–0

Baltimore Civic Center, Baltimore, Maryland
Attendance: 9,927

April 2

Boxscore

Baltimore Bullets 108, New York Knicks 115
Scoring by quarter: 29–25, 22–25, 29–32, 28–33
Pts: Monroe, Unseld 25 each Rebs: Wes Unseld 20; Asts: Kevin Loughery 7	Pts: Willis Reed 43; Rebs: Willis Reed 17; Asts: Walt Frazier 11
New York wins series, 4–0

Madison Square Garden, New York City, New York
Attendance: 19,500

This was the first playoff meeting between these two teams.

==== (2) Philadelphia 76ers vs. (4) Boston Celtics ====
March 26

Boxscore

Boston Celtics 114, Philadelphia 76ers 100
Scoring by quarter: 33–27, 27–22, 26–24, 28–27
Pts: John Havlicek 35; Rebs: Bill Russell 15; Asts: Bill Russell 8	Pts: Billy Cunningham 29; Rebs: Darrall Imhoff 19; Asts: Billy Cunningham 6
Boston leads series, 1–0

Spectrum, Philadelphia, Pennsylvania
Attendance: 8,151

March 28

Boxscore

Philadelphia 76ers 103, Boston Celtics 134
Scoring by quarter: 29–27, 25–28, 25–37, 24–42
Pts: Chet Walker 26; Rebs: Billy Cunningham 11; Asts: Matt Guokas 4	Pts: Bailey Howell 29; Rebs: Howell, Russell 16 each Asts: John Havlicek 7
Boston leads series, 2–0

Boston Garden, Boston, Massachusetts
Attendance: 13,751

March 30

Boxscore

Boston Celtics 125, Philadelphia 76ers 118
Scoring by quarter: 31–31, 36–34, 28–28, 30–25
Pts: Sam Jones 28; Rebs: Bill Russell 18; Asts: John Havlicek 10	Pts: Billy Cunningham 33; Rebs: Imhoff, Cunningham 14 each Asts: Hal Greer 7
Boston leads series, 3–0

Spectrum, Philadelphia, Pennsylvania
Attendance: 15,244

April 1

Boxscore

Philadelphia 76ers 119, Boston Celtics 116
Scoring by quarter: 25–25, 32–30, 28–28, 34–33
Pts: Hal Greer 24; Rebs: Darrall Imhoff 20; Asts: Hal Greer 7	Pts: John Havlicek 28; Rebs: Bill Russell 29; Asts: Bill Russell 5
Boston leads series, 3–1

Boston Garden, Boston, Massachusetts
Attendance: 14,017

April 4

Boxscore

Boston Celtics 93, Philadelphia 76ers 90
Scoring by quarter: 22–19, 18–21, 27–25, 26–25
Pts: John Havlicek 22; Rebs: Bill Russell 18; Asts: Bill Russell 6	Pts: Billy Cunningham 23; Rebs: Darrall Imhoff 19; Asts: Archie Clark 7
Boston wins series, 4–1

Spectrum, Philadelphia, Pennsylvania
Attendance: 15,244

This was the 13th playoff meeting between these two teams, with the Celtics winning seven of the first 12 meetings.

Previous playoff series
Boston leads 7–5 in all-time playoff series

1953

Boston Celtics 2, Syracuse Nationals 0

1953 Eastern Division Semifinals

1954

Boston Celtics 0, Syracuse Nationals 2

1954 Eastern Division Round Robin Semifinals

1954

Boston Celtics 0, Syracuse Nationals 2

1954 Eastern Division Finals

1955

Boston Celtics 1, Syracuse Nationals 3

1955 Eastern Division Finals

1956

Boston Celtics 1, Syracuse Nationals 2

1956 Eastern Division Semifinals

1957

Boston Celtics 3, Syracuse Nationals 0

1957 Eastern Division Finals

1959

Boston Celtics 4, Syracuse Nationals 3

1959 Eastern Division Finals

1961

Boston Celtics 4, Syracuse Nationals 1

1961 Eastern Division Finals

1965

Boston Celtics 4, Philadelphia 76ers 3

1965 Eastern Division Finals

1966

Boston Celtics 4, Philadelphia 76ers 1

1966 Eastern Division Finals

1967

Boston Celtics 1, Philadelphia 76ers 4

1967 Eastern Division Finals

1968

Boston Celtics 4, Philadelphia 76ers 3

1968 Eastern Division Finals

=== Western Division Semifinals ===
==== (1) Los Angeles Lakers vs. (3) San Francisco Warriors ====
March 26

Boxscore

San Francisco Warriors 99, Los Angeles Lakers 94
Scoring by quarter: 28–22, 19–25, 25–29, 27–18
Pts: Jeff Mullins 36; Rebs: Nate Thurmond 27; Asts: Al Attles 9	Pts: Jerry West 36; Rebs: Wilt Chamberlain 30; Asts: Jerry West 7
San Francisco leads series, 1–0

The Forum, Inglewood, California
Attendance: 10,697

March 28

Boxscore

San Francisco Warriors 107, Los Angeles Lakers 101
Scoring by quarter: 34–30, 30–23, 22–26, 21–22
Pts: Rudy LaRusso 29; Rebs: Nate Thurmond 28; Asts: Jim King 7	Pts: Jerry West 36; Rebs: Wilt Chamberlain 17; Asts: Jerry West 11
San Francisco leads series, 2–0

The Forum, Inglewood, California
Attendance: 15,119

March 31

Boxscore

Los Angeles Lakers 115, San Francisco Warriors 98
Scoring by quarter: 21–23, 22–22, 41–25, 31–28
Pts: Jerry West 25; Rebs: Wilt Chamberlain 28; Asts: Jerry West 9	Pts: Nate Thurmond 22; Rebs: Nate Thurmond 20; Asts: Nate Thurmond 5
San Francisco leads series, 2–1

Oakland–Alameda County Coliseum Arena, Oakland, California
Attendance: 13,221

April 2

Boxscore

Los Angeles Lakers 103, San Francisco Warriors 88
Scoring by quarter: 25–16, 32–19, 26–23, 20–30
Pts: Jerry West 36; Rebs: Wilt Chamberlain 14; Asts: Jerry West 5	Pts: Ron Williams 16; Rebs: Nate Thurmond 15; Asts: Nate Thurmond 4
Series tied, 2–2

Cow Palace, Daly City, California
Attendance: 14,812

April 4

Boxscore

San Francisco Warriors 98, Los Angeles Lakers 103
Scoring by quarter: 26–28, 18–32, 30–24, 24–19
Pts: Joe Ellis 23; Rebs: Bill Turner 14; Asts: Nate Thurmond 6	Pts: Jerry West 29; Rebs: Wilt Chamberlain 27; Asts: Jerry West 13
Los Angeles leads series, 3–2

The Forum, Inglewood, California
Attendance: 17,309

April 5

Boxscore

Los Angeles Lakers 118, San Francisco Warriors 78
Scoring by quarter: 29–20, 32–18, 24–17, 33–23
Pts: Jerry West 29; Rebs: Wilt Chamberlain 25; Asts: Jerry West 8	Pts: Jeff Mullins 21; Rebs: Nate Thurmond 14; Asts: Jeff Mullins 5
Los Angeles wins series, 4–2

Cow Palace, Daly City, California
Attendance: 8,924

- The Lakers become the first team to win a playoff series after losing the first 2 games at home.

This was the third playoff meeting between these two teams, with both teams splitting the first two meetings.

Previous playoff series
Tied 1–1 in all-time playoff series

1967

Los Angeles Lakers 0, San Francisco Warriors 3

1967 Western Division Semifinals

1968

Los Angeles Lakers 4, San Francisco Warriors 0

1968 Western Division Finals

==== (4) Atlanta Hawks vs. (2) San Diego Rockets ====
March 27

Boxscore

San Diego Rockets 98, Atlanta Hawks 107
Scoring by quarter: 26–18, 17–28, 26–36, 29–25
Pts: Elvin Hayes 31; Rebs: Toby Kimball 15; Asts: Art Williams 6	Pts: Lou Hudson 39; Rebs: Bill Bridges 22; Asts: Ohl, Hazzard 3 each
Atlanta leads series, 1–0

Alexander Memorial Coliseum, Atlanta, Georgia
Attendance: 4,194

March 29

Boxscore

San Diego Rockets 114, Atlanta Hawks 116
Scoring by quarter: 24–21, 21–30, 25–32, 44–33
Pts: Rick Adelman 26; Rebs: three players 9 each Asts: Rick Adelman 6	Pts: Zelmo Beaty 31; Rebs: Bill Bridges 14; Asts: Joe Caldwell 8
Atlanta leads series, 2–0

Alexander Memorial Coliseum, Atlanta, Georgia
Attendance: 6,006

April 1

Boxscore

Atlanta Hawks 97, San Diego Rockets 104
Scoring by quarter: 30–21, 26–28, 23–27, 18–28
Pts: Zelmo Beaty 31; Rebs: Zelmo Beaty 17; Asts: Joe Caldwell 6	Pts: Elvin Hayes 26; Rebs: Elvin Hayes 19; Asts: Rick Adelman 8
Atlanta leads series, 2–1

San Diego Sports Arena, San Diego, California
Attendance: 9,340

April 4

Boxscore

Atlanta Hawks 112, San Diego Rockets 114
Scoring by quarter: 32–26, 26–33, 19–23, 35–32
Pts: Walt Hazzard 34; Rebs: Beaty, Bridges 11 each Asts: Walt Hazzard 5	Pts: Elvin Hayes 30; Rebs: Elvin Hayes 20; Asts: Don Kojis 4
Series tied, 2–2

San Diego Sports Arena, San Diego, California
Attendance: 12,237

April 6

Boxscore

San Diego Rockets 101, Atlanta Hawks 112
Scoring by quarter: 26–25, 24–28, 27–31, 24–28
Pts: Elvin Hayes 27; Rebs: Elvin Hayes 9 Asts: Art Williams 8	Pts: Joe Caldwell 26; Rebs: Bill Bridges 17; Asts: Caldwell, Hazzard 5 each
Atlanta leads series, 3–2

Alexander Memorial Coliseum, Atlanta, Georgia
Attendance: 4,007

April 7

Boxscore

Atlanta Hawks 108, San Diego Rockets 106
Scoring by quarter: 23–29, 27–33, 27–22, 31–22
Pts: Lou Hudson 27; Rebs: Bill Bridges 17; Asts: Caldwell, Hazzard 4 each	Pts: Kojis, Hayes 26 each Rebs: Toby Kimball 15; Asts: Adelman, Williams 6 each
Atlanta wins series, 4–2

San Diego Sports Arena, San Diego, California
Attendance: 10,117

This was the first playoff meeting between these two teams.

== Division Finals ==
=== Eastern Division Finals ===
==== (3) New York Knicks vs. (4) Boston Celtics ====
April 6

Boxscore

Boston Celtics 108, New York Knicks 100
Scoring by quarter: 23–26, 33–23, 22–24, 30–27
Pts: John Havlicek 25; Rebs: Bill Russell 16; Asts: Em Bryant 8	Pts: Walt Frazier 34; Rebs: Dave DeBusschere 14; Asts: Walt Frazier 8
Boston leads series, 1–0

Madison Square Garden, New York City, New York
Attendance: 19,500

April 9

Boxscore

New York Knicks 97, Boston Celtics 112
Scoring by quarter: 14–26, 19–29, 30–32, 34–25
Pts: Willis Reed 28; Rebs: Willis Reed 13; Asts: Walt Frazier 4	Pts: Bailey Howell 27; Rebs: Bill Russell 29; Asts: John Havlicek 12
Boston leads series, 2–0

Boston Garden, Boston, Massachusetts
Attendance: 14,933

April 10

Boxscore

Boston Celtics 91, New York Knicks 101
Scoring by quarter: 19–28, 22–23, 29–24, 21–26
Pts: Russell, Bryant 16 each Rebs: Bill Russell 20; Asts: Russell, Havlicek 8 each	Pts: Walt Frazier 26; Rebs: Willis Reed 14; Asts: Walt Frazier 12
Boston leads series, 2–1

Madison Square Garden, New York City, New York
Attendance: 19,500

April 13

Boxscore

New York Knicks 96, Boston Celtics 97
Scoring by quarter: 26–25, 24–26, 23–24, 23–22
Pts: Willis Reed 22; Rebs: Willis Reed 19; Asts: Walt Frazier 6	Pts: Bill Russell 21; Rebs: Bill Russell 23; Asts: John Havlicek 4
Boston leads series, 3–1

Boston Garden, Boston, Massachusetts
Attendance: 13,506

April 14

Boxscore

Boston Celtics 104, New York Knicks 112
Scoring by quarter: 24–30, 22–30, 21–25, 37–27
Pts: John Havlicek 29; Rebs: Bill Russell 16; Asts: John Havlicek 7	Pts: Willis Reed 24; Rebs: Walt Frazier 12; Asts: Walt Frazier 9
Boston leads series, 3–2

Madison Square Garden, New York City, New York
Attendance: 19,500

April 18

Boxscore

New York Knicks 105, Boston Celtics 106
Scoring by quarter: 21–24, 31–33, 24–25, 29–24
Pts: Willis Reed 32; Rebs: Willis Reed 11; Asts: Bill Bradley 7	Pts: Sam Jones 29; Rebs: Bill Russell 21; Asts: Russell, Havlicek 5 each
Boston wins series, 4–2

Boston Garden, Boston, Massachusetts
Attendance: 14,933

- John Havlicek hits the series-winning shot.

This was the seventh playoff meeting between these two teams, with both teams splitting the first six meetings.

Previous playoff series
Tied 3–3 in all-time playoff series

1951

Boston Celtics 0, New York Knicks 2

1951 Eastern Division Semifinals

1952

Boston Celtics 1, New York Knicks 2

1952 Eastern Division Semifinals

1953

Boston Celtics 1, New York Knicks 3

1953 Eastern Division Finals

1954

Boston Celtics 2, New York Knicks 0

1954 Eastern Division Round Robin Semifinals

1955

Boston Celtics 2, New York Knicks 1

1955 Eastern Division Semifinals

1967

Boston Celtics 3, New York Knicks 1

1967 Eastern Division Semifinals

=== Western Division Finals ===
==== (1) Los Angeles Lakers vs. (2) Atlanta Hawks ====
April 11

Boxscore

Atlanta Hawks 93, Los Angeles Lakers 95
Scoring by quarter: 17–25, 23–28, 29–23, 24–19
Pts: Zelmo Beaty 29; Rebs: Bill Bridges 20; Asts: Walt Hazzard 6	Pts: Jerry West 25; Rebs: Wilt Chamberlain 29; Asts: Baylor, Egan 6 each
Los Angeles leads series, 1–0

The Forum, Inglewood, California
Attendance: 16,190

April 13

Boxscore

Atlanta Hawks 102, Los Angeles Lakers 104
Scoring by quarter: 21–27, 31–25, 30–29, 20–23
Pts: Joe Caldwell 34; Rebs: Caldwell, Bridges 10 each Asts: Bill Bridges 5	Pts: Wilt Chamberlain 23; Rebs: Wilt Chamberlain 29; Asts: Johnny Egan 11
Los Angeles leads series, 2–0

The Forum, Inglewood, California
Attendance: 15,136

April 15

Boxscore

Los Angeles Lakers 86, Atlanta Hawks 99
Scoring by quarter: 18–18, 20–28, 23–23, 25–30
Pts: Johnny Egan 19; Rebs: Wilt Chamberlain 22; Asts: West, Baylor 4 each	Pts: Zelmo Beaty 22; Rebs: Zelmo Beaty 15; Asts: Lou Hudson 5
Los Angeles leads series, 2–1

Alexander Memorial Coliseum, Atlanta, Georgia
Attendance: 7,140

April 17

Boxscore

Los Angeles Lakers 100, Atlanta Hawks 85
Scoring by quarter: 20–15, 21–28, 26–20, 33–22
Pts: Wilt Chamberlain 25; Rebs: Wilt Chamberlain 19; Asts: Jerry West 5	Pts: Lou Hudson 35; Rebs: Zelmo Beaty 20; Asts: Bill Bridges 5
Los Angeles leads series, 3–1

Alexander Memorial Coliseum, Atlanta, Georgia
Attendance: 7,140

April 20

Boxscore

Atlanta Hawks 96, Los Angeles Lakers 104
Scoring by quarter: 16–22, 26–32, 29–22, 25–23
Pts: Zelmo Beaty 30; Rebs: Bill Bridges 22; Asts: Lou Hudson 7	Pts: Elgin Baylor 29; Rebs: Wilt Chamberlain 29; Asts: Elgin Baylor 12
Los Angeles wins series, 4–1

The Forum, Inglewood, California
Attendance: 16,273

This was the ninth playoff meeting between these two teams, with the Hawks winning five of the first eight meetings while in St. Louis.

Previous playoff series
Atlanta/ St. Louis leads 5–3 in all-time playoff series

1956

St. Louis Hawks 2, Minneapolis Lakers 1

1956 Western Division Semifinals

1957

St. Louis Hawks 3, Minneapolis Lakers 0

1957 Western Division Finals

1959

St. Louis Hawks 2, Minneapolis Lakers 4

1959 Western Division Finals

1960

St. Louis Hawks 4, Minneapolis Lakers 3

1960 Western Division Finals

1961

St. Louis Hawks 4, Los Angeles Lakers 3

1961 Western Division Finals

1963

St. Louis Hawks 3, Los Angeles Lakers 4

1963 Western Division Finals

1964

St. Louis Hawks 3, Los Angeles Lakers 2

1964 Western Division Semifinals

1966

St. Louis Hawks 3, Los Angeles Lakers 4

1966 Western Division Finals

== NBA Finals: (W1) Los Angeles Lakers vs. (E4) Boston Celtics ==
April 23

Boxscore

Boston Celtics 118, Los Angeles Lakers 120
Scoring by quarter: 32–33, 26–23, 26–26, 34–38
Pts: John Havlicek 37; Rebs: Bill Russell 27; Asts: Sam Jones 6	Pts: Jerry West 53; Rebs: Wilt Chamberlain 23; Asts: Jerry West 10
Los Angeles leads series, 1–0

The Forum, Inglewood, California
Attendance: 17,554

April 25

Boxscore

Boston Celtics 112, Los Angeles Lakers 118
Scoring by quarter: 25–24, 30–29, 30–35, 27–30
Pts: John Havlicek 43; Rebs: Bill Russell 21; Asts: Bill Russell 13	Pts: Jerry West 41; Rebs: Wilt Chamberlain 19; Asts: Egan, West 8 each
Los Angeles leads series, 2–0

The Forum, Inglewood, California
Attendance: 17,559

April 27

Boxscore

Los Angeles Lakers 105, Boston Celtics 111
Scoring by quarter: 16–25, 24–32, 38–21, 27–33
Pts: Jerry West 24; Rebs: Wilt Chamberlain 26; Asts: Jerry West 6	Pts: John Havlicek 34; Rebs: Bill Russell 18; Asts: John Havlicek 7
Los Angeles leads series, 2–1

Boston Garden, Boston, Massachusetts
Attendance: 14,037

April 29

Boxscore

Los Angeles Lakers 88, Boston Celtics 89
Scoring by quarter: 15–16, 26–33, 29–18, 18–22
Pts: Jerry West 40; Rebs: Wilt Chamberlain 31; Asts: West, Baylor 4 each	Pts: John Havlicek 21; Rebs: Bill Russell 29; Asts: five players 2 each
Series tied, 2–2

Boston Garden, Boston, Massachusetts
Attendance: 15,128

- Sam Jones hits the game-winner at the buzzer.

May 1

Boxscore

Boston Celtics 104, Los Angeles Lakers 117
Scoring by quarter: 24–23, 21–26, 24–30, 35–38
Pts: Sam Jones 25; Rebs: John Havlicek 14; Asts: Russell, Havlicek 5 each	Pts: Jerry West 39; Rebs: Wilt Chamberlain 31; Asts: Jerry West 9
Los Angeles leads series, 3–2

The Forum, Inglewood, California
Attendance: 17,553

May 3

Boxscore

Los Angeles Lakers 90, Boston Celtics 99
Scoring by quarter: 22–32, 17–23, 26–27, 25–17
Pts: West, Baylor 26 each Rebs: Wilt Chamberlain 18; Asts: Wilt Chamberlain 4	Pts: Don Nelson 25; Rebs: Bill Russell 19; Asts: Em Bryant 5
Series tied, 3–3

Boston Garden, Boston, Massachusetts
Attendance: 15,128

May 5

Boxscore

Boston Celtics 108, Los Angeles Lakers 106
Scoring by quarter: 28–25, 31–31, 32–20, 17–30
Pts: John Havlicek 26; Rebs: Bill Russell 21; Asts: Bill Russell 6	Pts: Jerry West 42; Rebs: Wilt Chamberlain 27; Asts: Jerry West 12
Boston wins series, 4–3

The Forum, Inglewood, California
Attendance: 17,568

- Don Nelson hit a foul-line jumper which dropped through the basket after hitting the back rim and bouncing several feet straight up. The shot gave the Celtics a 105–102 lead after the Lakers cut their lead to 103–102.
- Bill Russell and Sam Jones’ final NBA game; Celtics become the first team to come back from a 2–0 series deficit in the NBA Finals.

This was the seventh playoff meeting between these two teams, with the Celtics winning the first six meetings.

Previous playoff series
Boston leads 6–0 in all-time playoff series

1959

Boston Celtics 4, Minneapolis Lakers 0

1959 NBA Finals

1962

Boston Celtics 4, Los Angeles Lakers 3

1962 NBA Finals

1963

Boston Celtics 4, Los Angeles Lakers 2

1963 NBA Finals

1965

Boston Celtics 4, Los Angeles Lakers 1

1965 NBA Finals

1966

Boston Celtics 4, Los Angeles Lakers 3

1966 NBA Finals

1968

Boston Celtics 4, Los Angeles Lakers 2

1968 NBA Finals

== See also ==
- 1969 NBA Finals
- 1969 NBA season
