= Bill Bridges (basketball) =

American basketball player

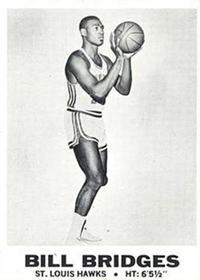
- Bridges in 1968 card

Personal information
- Born: April 4, 1939 Hobbs, New Mexico, U.S.
- Died: September 25, 2015 (aged 76) Santa Monica, California, U.S.
- Listed height: 6 ft 6 in (1.98 m)
- Listed weight: 228 lb (103 kg)

Career information
- High school: Hobbs (Hobbs, New Mexico)
- College: Kansas (1958–1961)
- NBA draft: 1961: 3rd round, 32nd overall pick
- Drafted by: Chicago Packers
- Playing career: 1961–1975
- Position: Power forward / center
- Number: 10, 32, 23, 35

Career history
- 1961–1963: Kansas City Steers
- 1963–1971: St. Louis / Atlanta Hawks
- 1971–1972: Philadelphia 76ers
- 1972–1974: Los Angeles Lakers
- 1975: Golden State Warriors

Career highlights
- NBA champion (1975); 3× NBA All-Star (1967, 1968, 1970); 2× NBA All-Defensive Second Team (1969, 1970); All-ABL First Team (1962); No. 32 jersey retired by Kansas Jayhawks

Career NBA statistics
- Points: 11,012 (11.9 ppg)
- Rebounds: 11,054 (11.9 rpg)
- Assists: 2,553 (2.8 apg)
- Stats at NBA.com
- Stats at Basketball Reference

William C. Bridges (April 4, 1939 – September 25, 2015) was an American basketball player who earned a National Basketball Association (NBA) championship and multiple NBA All-Star honors. Bridges played 13 seasons as a power forward in the NBA for various teams, including the St. Louis / Atlanta Hawks, Philadelphia 76ers, Los Angeles Lakers, and Golden State Warriors.

== Early years ==
Born on April 4, 1939, Bridges grew up in Hobbs, New Mexico. He attended Hobbs High School and played for the Hobbs Eagles and legendary high school basketball coach Ralph Tasker, on one of New Mexico's first integrated high school teams. Bridges led Hobbs High School to New Mexico state high school basketball championships in 1956 and 1957, and an overall 57–5 record over those two years.

== College career ==
Bridges enrolled at the University of Kansas for the 1957–1958 school year as a non-scholarship "walk-on". With freshmen ineligible for varsity competition until 1972, Bridges competed effectively in practice sessions during his 'redshirt' season against fellow Jayhawk Wilt Chamberlain who was playing his second and final season at Kansas. Bridges' performance in practices in the 1957-1958 season earned him a scholarship for his remaining three years.

During his subsequent three seasons of competition 1958-1959, 1959-1960, and 1960-1961 for the Kansas Jayhawks, Bridges averaged 13.2 points and 13.9 rebounds per game. He led the Big Eight in rebounding all three years (13.7, 13.8 and 14.1 rebounds per game as a sophomore, junior and senior respectively).

Bridges was chosen All-Big Eight all three seasons, and was an honorable mention All-American in 1961.

== Professional playing career ==
After graduation from Kansas in 1961, Bridges was drafted by the Chicago Packers (currently Washington Wizards) with the 32nd pick in the 3rd round of the 1961 NBA draft.

=== American Basketball League ===
Instead of signing with the Packers, Bridges played for the Kansas City Steers of the American Basketball League (ABL) prior to entering the NBA. The ABL was founded by Abe Saperstein in 1960 and consisted of six teams. (Saperstein had also founded the Harlem Globetrotters.) Future Hall of Fame forward Connie Hawkins was among the ABL's players. Bridges led the ABL in rebounding during both seasons he played for the Steers and led the league in scoring during his second season. He set the ABL single-game scoring record with 55 points on December 9, 1962, and scored 49 points in his next game. Saperstein suspended play soon after because of financial losses, and the league folded at the end of 1962, with the Steers declared ABL champions.

=== National Basketball Association ===
==== St. Louis/Atlanta Hawks ====
The NBA's St. Louis Hawks signed Bridges to a contract less than two weeks after the ABL suspended play. Bridges spent the next 13 seasons (1962–1975) as a member of the St. Louis/Atlanta Hawks, Philadelphia 76ers, Los Angeles Lakers, and Golden State Warriors.

After signing in January 1963, Bridges played in 27 games for the Hawks, averaging 14 minutes, 5.3 rebounds and 6.1 points per game. His playing time increased by ten minutes per game the following season, and he averaged 8.5 points and 8.5 rebounds per game. Though he was only a part-time player, Bridges was in the NBA's top-20 for total rebounds. The Hawks finished second in the NBA's western division both years, losing in the division finals both years.

By 1964-65, Bridges was averaging nearly 30 minutes per game at forward with the Hawks, alongside aging Hall of Fame forwards Bob Pettit and Cliff Hagan, and future Hall of Fame center Zelmo Beatty. Bridges (10.8), Pettit (12.4) and Beatty (12.1) all averaged over 10 rebounds per game. The Hawks bench included rookie forward Paul Silas, who would go on to become one of the top rebounders in NBA history. Once again, the Hawks finished second in the Western Division, losing in the semifinals to the Baltimore Bullets.

Pettit retired and Bridges was the Hawks' starting power forward for the 1965-66 season, averaging 13 points and 12.2 rebounds in 34.3 minutes per game. His 12.2 rebounds per game was 7th best in the NBA, just behind Beatty at 13.6 per game. The team lost once again in the Western Division Finals.

Bridges's breakout season came with the Hawks during the 1966-67 season. He averaged 17.4 points and 15.1 rebounds playing nearly 40 minutes per game, and was selected to the All-Star team for the first time. He was fifth in the NBA in rebounding, behind only future Hall of Famers Wilt Chamberlain, Nate Thurmond, Bill Russell and Jerry Lucas. He was selected to the All-Star team again in the 1967-68 season, when he averaged 15.6 points and 13.4 rebounds per game (7th best in the NBA). The Hawks finished first in the Western Division, but lost in the first round of the playoffs.

Bridges was named to the All-NBA defensive second team for the 1968-69 season, and was 8th in the NBA with a 14.2 rebounds per game average. The Hawks were now in Atlanta, but once again lost in the Western Division Finals. Bridges was named team captain before the 1968-69 season. Bridges was again named to the All-NBA defensive second-team for the 1969-70 season, was selected as an All-Star for the third time, and finished 8th in Most Valuable Player voting. His 14.4 rebounds per game were fourth in the NBA behind future Hall of Famers Elvin Hayes, Wes Unseld and Kareem Abdul-Jabbar. The Hawks again finished first in the western division and again lost in the Western Division Finals.

In 1970-71, his last full season with the Hawks, Bridges averaged 11.9 points and 15 rebounds per game (sixth best in the NBA behind Chamberlain, Unseld, Hayes, Abdul-Jabbar and Lucas). He was Atlanta's team captain that year, but had a pre-season dispute with coach Richie Guerin leading to a short suspension; still remaining team captain afterward. After playing only 14 games for the Hawks during the 1971-72 season, averaging 13.6 rebounds per game, the Hawks traded Bridges to the Philadelphia 76ers for Jim Washington.

==== Philadelphia 76ers, Los Angeles Lakers, Golden State Warriors ====
Bridges averaged 13.2 points and 13.5 rebounds per game in 64 games with the 76ers. He was 10th in the league in rebounding average, just above Lucas. The 76ers traded Bridges and Mel Counts to the Los Angeles Lakers 10 games into the 1972-73 season, for John Q. Trapp and LeRoy Ellis. The Sixers went on to a 9–73 won–loss record that season, the worst in NBA history. In Los Angeles, Bridges was reunited with Chamberlain and joined a team that went 60–22 during the season and reached the NBA Finals. Bridges averaged nearly 35 minutes, 10 points and 11 rebounds per game for the Lakers during the regular season, and nine points and 10.6 rebounds per game in his first NBA finals, where the Lakers lost to the New York Knicks.

The 1972-73 season was the first time in seven years that Bridges was not among the NBA's top-10 players in rebounding average. Bridges averaged not quite 28 minutes per game during the 1973-74 Lakers' season, his lowest average minutes played in 10 years. Happy Hairston had become the team's starting power forward over Bridges. Bridges average rebounds per game fell below 10 for the first time in nine years.

Bridges played in only 17 games for the Lakers during the 1974-75 season. He had knee problems and was released, but then signed as a free agent at 36-years old with the Golden State Warriors, just before the roster change deadline in February 1975. The Warriors finished the regular season 48–34, and went on to win the NBA Championship in a four-game sweep of the Washington Bullets, after defeating the Seattle SuperSonics 4–2 in the Western Conference Semifinals and the Chicago Bulls 4–3 in the Western Conference Finals. In game 6 against the Bulls, on the verge of elimination, Bridges played a key role in leading the Warriors to victory with 11 rebounds in 28 minutes as a reserve forward. In the 1975 NBA Finals against Washington, Bridges logged in 31 combined minutes, scoring four total points with seven rebounds; in the decisive Game 4, he recorded two points in the 96-95 victory. It was the last game played by Bridges in the NBA.

==== Career ====
Though undersized at 6 ft 5½ in (1.97 m) or 6 ft 6 in (1.98 m) and 228 pounds (103 kg) for his position as a power forward, Bridges was an elite rebounder and averaged a double-double (11.9 points, 11.9 rebounds) over the course of his NBA career.

Bridges' tally of 11,054 career rebounds is ranked 31st in the history of the NBA (through the 2024-25 season). Of the 30 players ahead of him, only Hall of Fame forwards Charles Barkley and Elgin Baylor are listed at the same height or shorter. Bridges is one of twelve retired players to have recorded over 10,000 rebounds in less than 1,000 games played (926). He is one of 24 players with nine seasons averaging 10 points and 10 rebounds in the same season.

Bridges is one of four players to record more than 35 rebounds in an NBA playoff game. The other three are Hall of Fame centers (Bill Russell seven times, Wilt Chamberlain seven times, and Willis Reed once), Bridges being the only forward to do so. Bridges, then playing for the Atlanta Hawks, tallied 36 rebounds in Game 2 of the 1971 Eastern Conference Semifinals versus the New York Knicks.

Bridges' league-leading 366 personal fouls during the 1967–68 season was, at the time, an NBA record.

== Personal life and death ==
After retirement from the NBA in 1975, Bridges became an environmental consultant based in Santa Monica, California. He worked for Los Angeles mayor Tom Bradley's administration in the 1980s.

Bridges died in Los Angeles, California at the age of 76 following a battle with cancer.

== NBA career statistics ==
Legend
GP	Games played	GS	Games started	MPG	Minutes per game
FG%	Field goal percentage	3P%	3-point field goal percentage	FT%	Free throw percentage
RPG	Rebounds per game	APG	Assists per game	SPG	Steals per game
BPG	Blocks per game	PPG	Points per game	**Bold**	Career high
†	Won an NBA championship

=== Regular season ===
Year	Team	GP	GS	MPG	FG%	3P%	FT%	RPG	APG	SPG	BPG	PPG
1962–63	St. Louis	27	—	13.9	.413	—	.627	5.3	0.9	—	—	6.1
1963–64	St. Louis	80	—	24.4	.397	—	.652	8.5	2.3	—	—	8.5
1964–65	St. Louis	79	—	29.9	.386	—	.676	10.8	2.4	—	—	11.5
1965–66	St. Louis	78	—	34.3	.407	—	.706	12.2	2.7	—	—	13.0
1966–67	St. Louis	79	—	39.6	.455	—	.702	**15.1**	2.8	—	—	**17.4**
1967–68	St. Louis	**82**	—	39.0	.462	—	**.717**	13.4	3.1	—	—	15.6
1968–69	Atlanta	80	—	36.6	.453	—	.677	14.2	3.7	—	—	11.8
1969–70	Atlanta	**82**	—	**39.9**	.475	—	.734	14.4	**4.2**	—	—	14.8
1970–71	Atlanta	**82**	—	38.3	.458	—	.639	15.0	2.9	—	—	11.9
1971–72	Atlanta	14	—	39.0	.381	—	.705	13.6	2.9	—	—	9.5
1971–72	Philadelphia	64	—	34.5	**.509**	—	.702	13.5	2.5	—	—	13.2
1972–73	Philadelphia	10	—	37.6	.376	—	.708	12.2	2.3	—	—	14.0
1972–73	L.A. Lakers	72	—	34.6	.479	—	.700	10.9	2.7	—	—	9.8
1973–74	L.A. Lakers	65	—	27.9	.421	—	.707	7.7	3.9	**0.9**	**0.5**	8.4
1974–75	L.A. Lakers	17	—	18.1	.351	—	.533	5.5	1.0	0.4	0.2	3.3
1974–75†	Golden State	15	—	7.2	.417	—	.250	2.7	0.3	0.3	0.0	2.1
Career		926	—	33.3	.442	—	.693	11.9	2.8	0.7	0.4	11.9
All-Star		3	0	17.7	.813	—	.182	7.4	2.0	—	—	9.3

=== Playoffs ===
Year	Team	GP	GS	MPG	FG%	3P%	FT%	RPG	APG	SPG	BPG	PPG
1963	St. Louis	11	—	18.5	.427	—	.741	7.8	0.8	—	—	9.3
1964	St. Louis	12	—	20.0	.313	—	.632	7.0	2.0	—	—	5.3
1965	St. Louis	4	—	36.3	.356	—	.667	16.8	2.3	—	—	13.0
1966	St. Louis	10	—	42.1	.506	—	.721	14.9	2.8	—	—	**20.3**
1967	St. Louis	9	—	41.0	.375	—	.672	18.8	2.4	—	—	15.7
1968	St. Louis	6	—	36.0	**.507**	—	.720	12.8	2.3	—	—	15.7
1969	Atlanta	11	—	40.2	.442	—	.708	16.4	**3.4**	—	—	15.6
1970	Atlanta	9	—	42.3	.400	—	.593	17.1	3.2	—	—	11.6
1971	Atlanta	5	—	**45.8**	.397	—	.333	**20.8**	1.0	—	—	9.8
1973	L.A. Lakers	**17**	—	34.2	.419	—	**.776**	9.3	1.7	—	—	8.9
1974	L.A. Lakers	5	—	28.8	.293	—	.492	6.0	1.2	**1.4**	0.0	6.0
1975†	Golden State	14	—	10.6	.435	—	.286	3.5	0.5	0.6	**0.3**	1.6
Career		113	—	31.2	.419	—	.673	11.5	1.9	0.8	0.2	10.5

== Awards ==
Starting in 1962, in what Bridges called his greatest honor, the University of Kansas basketball program named its yearly post-season individual rebounding award the "Bill Bridges Rebounding Award".

In 2002, at a ceremony during a game at Allen Field House, Bridges was honored as the first Jayhawk to record 1,000 points and 1,000 rebounds in a career.

In 2004, the University of Kansas retired Bridges' jersey at a ceremony in Allen Field House.

In 2014, Bridges was inducted into the New Mexico Sports Hall of Fame.

In 2016, Bridges was inducted into the Kansas Sports Hall of Fame.

== See also ==
- List of NBA career rebounding leaders
- List of NBA career personal fouls leaders
- List of NBA career playoff rebounding leaders
