= Johnny Egan (basketball) =

American basketball player and coach (1939–2022)

Personal information
- Born: January 31, 1939 Hartford, Connecticut, U.S.
- Died: July 21, 2022 (aged 83) Houston, Texas, U.S.
- Listed height: 6 ft 0 in (1.83 m)
- Listed weight: 180 lb (82 kg)

Career information
- High school: Weaver (Hartford, Connecticut)
- College: Providence (1958–1961)
- NBA draft: 1961: 2nd round, 12th overall pick
- Drafted by: Detroit Pistons
- Playing career: 1961–1972
- Position: Point guard
- Number: 25, 15, 11, 21

Career history

Playing
- 1961–1963: Detroit Pistons
- 1963–1965: New York Knicks
- 1965–1968: Baltimore Bullets
- 1968–1970: Los Angeles Lakers
- 1970: Cleveland Cavaliers
- 1970–1972: San Diego / Houston Rockets

Coaching
- 1973–1976: Houston Rockets

Career highlights
- Second-team Parade All-American (1957)

Career NBA statistics
- Points: 5,521 (7.8 ppg)
- Rebounds: 1,284 (1.8 rpg)
- Assists: 2,102 (3.0 apg)
- Stats at NBA.com
- Stats at Basketball Reference

John Francis Egan (January 31, 1939 – July 21, 2022) was an American professional basketball player and coach. He played for the Detroit Pistons, New York Knicks, Baltimore Bullets, Los Angeles Lakers, Cleveland Cavaliers, and San Diego / Houston Rockets of the National Basketball Association from 1961 to 1972. Egan was an integral part of the 1968–69 Los Angeles Lakers team that came within three points of winning an NBA championship. The 5 ft 11 in (1.8 m) or 6 ft (1.83 m) Egan was among the shortest players in the NBA throughout his career. Egan was the Rockets head coach from January 1973 to April 1976. He coached the first team in Rockets' history not to have a losing record. He was the Rockets' television color commentator alongside Bill Worrell after his coaching career ended.

Egan played college basketball for the Providence Friars, and was selected to the Friars Athletic Hall of Fame in 1974. The Friars were invited to play in the National Invitation Tournament (NIT) all three years he was on the varsity team; losing in the 1960 NIT championship game, and winning the 1961 NIT championship. He was twice named to the second-team NIT All-Tournament team by the Associated Press and was selected first-team NIT All-Tournament in 1961 by United Press International. He led the Friars in scoring as a sophomore, breaking the school's scoring record at the time. Egan was named a Parade All-American as a high school basketball player in Hartford, Connecticut.

== Early life ==
Egan was born on January 31, 1939, in Hartford, Connecticut. Playing for the basketball team at Weaver High School, which won the New England high school basketball championship in 1956 and 1957, Egan was named to the Parade All-America Boys Basketball Team. In 1957, he set numerous scoring records during the Connecticut Interscholastic Athletic Conference basketball tournament. Egan was known as "Space", a nickname which alluded to "his ability to stay in the air during drives to the basket or to the length of his long-distance shots". The nickname followed him into his NBA playing days.

In 1957, Egan attended a basketball summer camp run by future NBA Hall of Fame Boston Celtics' guard Bob Cousy.

== College career ==
Egan attended Providence College, where he played college basketball for the Providence Friars under head coach Joe Mullaney. The Friars participated in the National Invitation Tournament (NIT) all three years Egan was on the team, winning the 1961 National Invitation Tournament.

As a sophomore (1958–59), the 5 ft 11 in (1.80 m) or 6 ft (1.83 m) Egan played in the Providence backcourt with 6 ft 1 in (1.85 m) future NBA Hall of Fame junior guard Lenny WIlkens. Egan led the 20–7 Friars with a 20.9 points per game scoring average. Egan scored 39 points in a January 1959 quadruple overtime game against Villanova at the Palestra in Philadelphia; setting a school single game scoring record at the time.

Providence was chosen to participate in the 1959 National Invitation Tournament (NIT). Egan scored 28 points in Providence's first round NIT win over the Manhattan Jaspers, 68–66. Egan won the game with a 35-foot jump shot with seconds remaining in the game. Providence won the second game in the 1959 NIT in double overtime, 75–72, against the St. Louis Billikens. Egan made two free throws to put the Friars ahead 69–68 in the double overtime period; and then made two more free throws to give Providence a 75–72 lead with 10 seconds left in the game to seal the victory. Egan had 25 points in the game, and Wilkens had 30. Providence lost in the next round to St. John's, 76–55, with Egan scoring only six points.

In 1959–60, Egan and Wilkins both averaged 14.2 points per game for the Friars, only behind center James Hadnot (14.8). The Friars had a 24–5 record that season, and were ranked No. 14 by the Associated Press (AP) at the end of the season. Providence was invited to participate in the 1960 National Invitation Tournament, but was unseeded.

The Friars defeated the Memphis Tigers in the 1960 NIT tournament's first round, 71–70. Egan and Wilkens together scored 31 of Providence's 35 second-half points; with Wilkens scoring 28 and Egan 23 in the game. The Friars met and defeated the St. Louis Billikens again in the second round, 64–53; Egan leading the Friars with 19 points. Providence then beat the top-10 ranked Utah State Aggies in the semifinals, 68–62. Wilkens had 18 points and Egan 16. Providence played Chet Walker and No. 4 ranked Bradley in the championship game, losing 88–72. Egan had 20 points and Wilkens 25. The AP named Egan to its second-team NIT All-Tournament Team.

As a senior (1960–61), Egan was team captain. He was second on the team in scoring (18.9 points per game) to Hadnot. The Friars again finished 24–5, and were invited to play in the 1961 National Invitation Tournament. Egan scored 34 points in the Friars first round win over DePaul, 73–67. Egan then led Providence with 23 points to a second round win over Niagara, 71–68. Providence then beat Holy Cross in overtime, 90–83, in the NIT semifinals; with Egan scoring 29 points. Providence won the 1961 NIT championship game over St. Louis, 62–59. Egan had only nine points, but made two baskets towards the end of the game to tie the score at 55 during a Friars rally. United Press International (UPI) named Egan to its first-team NIT All-Tournament Team, and the AP again named him to its second team.

During his Providence career Egan broke the school records for most points in a season, scoring 502 as a sophomore; and most career points (ending with a total of 1,434). Egan played in a 1961 all-star game as part of the Metropolitan Catholic Basketball Festival in New York. One of the sponsors, Bob Cousy, said at the time "'Egan is my boy. Johnny is a great dribbler, driver, shooter and playmaker'".

== Professional career ==
=== Detroit Pistons ===
The Detroit Pistons of the National Basketball Association (NBA) selected Egan in the second round of the 1961 NBA draft, 17th overall. Egan played in 58 games as a rookie, averaging 12 minutes, 5.5 points, and 1.8 assists per game. He averaged the fewest minutes per game on the 1961–62 Pistons roster. Egan's highest scoring game of the regular season came in an upset victory over the reigning NBA champion Boston Celtics and his mentor Bob Cousy. Egan started in place of Don Ohl (sick with the flu) and had 21 points in the Pistons' 124–120 victory.

The Pistons reached the Western Division finals of the 1962 NBA playoffs. Egan only played briefly in one game of the Pistons first round series win over the Cincinnati Royals in four games. After losing the first three games of the finals to the Los Angeles Lakers, Egan was given an opportunity to play in Game 4 when starting guard Don Ohl took ill. Egan scored 21 points in helping lead the Pistons to a 118–117 victory. Egan started Game 5 and scored 23 points in the Pistons 132–125 win in Los Angeles. The Lakers won the series in Game 6, 123–117, but Egan had 19 points as a starter.

The Pistons re-signed Egan for the 1962–63 season a few days after the series with the Lakers ended. He played in only 46 games in 1962–63, averaging 16.3 minutes, 5.9 points, and 2.5 assists per game. Egan began the 1963–64 season as a starter for the Pistons, under new head coach Charlie Wolf. Egan started 24 games, averaging 34.9 minutes, 11.1 points, 4.8 assists, and 2.6 rebounds per game for the Pistons. The Pistons traded Egan to the New York Knicks as part of a three-team trade on December 16, 1963.

=== New York Knicks ===
Egan played in 42 games for the Knicks during the 1963–64 season. He averaged 35.4 minutes per game; the most he ever averaged in any season for a team. He averaged 14.1 points, 5.8 assists, and 3.1 rebounds per game with the Knicks that season. Overall in the 1963–64 season, he averaged career-highs of 13 points, 5.4 assists, and 2.9 rebounds in 35.2 minutes per game. He played in 74 games for the Knicks in 1964–65 starting only 26 games. Egan averaged 22.5 minutes, 9.2 points, 3.4 assists, and 1.9 rebounds per game. Early in the 1965–66 season on November 1, 1965, the Knicks traded Egan, Johnny Green, Jim "Bad News" Barnes and cash to the Baltimore Bullets for future Hall of Fame center Walt Bellamy.

=== Baltimore Bullets ===
Egan played 69 games as a reserve and starting point guard with the Bullets during the 1965-66 season, initially playing behind former Pistons' teammate Don Ohl. Egan averaged 23 minutes, 9.8 points, 3.8 assists, and 2.6 rebounds per game with the Bullets that season. He had to step up as a starter when Ohl suffered a broken cheekbone in late January 1966.

Egan had been averaging only 17 minutes per game before Ohl's injury. On February 3, he led the Bullets to a 122–113 win over the St. Louis Hawks, with 25 points and seven assists in 44 minutes played. Egan's best game of the season came on February 12 against the San Francisco Warriors, when he had 30 points, 14 assists, and eight rebounds in 44 minutes. Ohl began starting again on February 15, but Egan continued to receive substantial playing time. In a February 23 win over Wilt Chamberlain and the Philadelphia 76ers, Egan and Ohl both started; with Egan having 22 points, seven assists, and six rebounds in 41 minutes and Ohl scoring 23 points in 31 minutes.

With Bullets starting shooting guard Kevin Loughery injured and of limited availability during the 1966 NBA playoffs, Egan started alongside Ohl for the Bullets in the Western Division semifinals. The Bullets lost to the St. Louis Hawks in three games, with Egan averaging 39 minutes, 16 points, 7.7 assists, and three rebounds per game in that three-game series. Egan had the defensive responsibility to cover his former Providence Friars teammate Lenny Wilkens.

In 1966–67, he played in 71 games for the Bullets, averaging 24.5 minutes, 10.1 points, 3.9 assists, and 2.5 rebounds per game. The following season (1967–68), Rookie of the Year and future Hall of Fame guard Earl Monroe joined the Bullets. Egan was now the fourth guard on the team behind Monroe, Loughery, and Ohl. Egan averaged only 13.9 minutes and seven points per game. The Bullets did not protect Egan in the 1968 NBA expansion draft, and he was selected by the Milwaukee Bucks in May 1968.

=== Los Angeles Lakers ===
Shortly before the start of the 1968–69 NBA season, the Bucks traded Egan to the Los Angeles Lakers for a future draft pick. He was said to be the shortest player in the NBA that season. Egan became a key rotation player for the Lakers, under coach Butch van Breda Kolff. The Lakers reached the 1969 NBA Finals but were beaten by the Boston Celtics in Game 7. Egan played in all 82 games that season, averaging 22 minutes, 8.5 points, 2.6 assists, and 1.8 rebounds per game.

In the 1969 Western Division semifinals, the Lakers defeated the San Francisco Warriors in six games. Egan played 28.2 minutes per game, averaging 11.2 points, 3.2 assists, and 2.7 rebounds per game. The Lakers lost the first two games in the series, with Egan playing as a reserve. Coach van Breda Kolff made Egan a starter in Game 3, and he scored 18 points in the Lakers win; providing key scoring with Jerry West in the third period to turn the game in the Lakers' favor. Egan started again in Game 4; scoring 10 points in 25 minutes. He started and played 39 minutes in Game 5, scoring 14 points; and played 26 minutes as a starter in the Lakers 118–78 Game 6 win.

Egan remained a starter in the Western Division finals; the Lakers defeating the Atlanta Hawks in five games. Egan averaged 32 minutes, 15.6 points, 4.6 assists, and 2.2 rebounds per game in the series. In the seven-game series against the Celtics, Egan averaged 34.6 minutes, 15.1 points, four assists, and 2.4 rebounds per game. He had 26 points, eight assists, and four rebounds in the Lakers Game 2 win, 118–112. He had 22 points in the Game 3 loss to the Celtics; and 23 points and six assists in the Lakers' Game 5 win. He had nine points in 27 minutes in the Lakers 108–106 loss in Game 7.

Egan was not as effective in the following season (1969–70). He still averaged 22.6 minutes, 7.3 points, three assists, and 1.4 rebounds per game. He played five games as a reserve in the Lakers seven-game Western Division semifinal series win over the Phoenix Suns; averaging 11.6 minutes and 3.4 points per game. In the Lakers' four game sweep of the Atlanta Hawks in the Western Division finals, Egan averaged eight minutes per game. The Lakers again reached the Finals but were beaten by the Knicks in Game 7. Egan played in all seven games, averaging 10.3 minutes and 3.6 points per game.

=== Cleveland Cavaliers and San Diego/Houston Rockets ===
The Lakers did not protect Egan in the 1970 NBA expansion draft, and he was selected by the Cleveland Cavaliers. He began the 1970–71 season with the Cavaliers, playing in 26 games; averaging 15.8 minutes and four points per game. On December 8, 1970, the Cavaliers traded Egan to the San Diego Rockets for a third‐round draft pick in the 1971 NBA draft (41st overall–Jackie Ridgle) and cash on December 8, 1970. He played in 36 games for the San Diego Rockets, averaging 11.5 minutes and two points per game to finish the season.

The following season, Egan became one of the original Houston Rockets when the team left San Diego in 1971. He appeared in 38 games for the Houston Rockets, averaging 11.5 minutes and 2.9 points per game. His final NBA game came on March 5, 1972.

Egan's playing career ended after the 1971–72 season. He played 11 seasons in the NBA, averaging 20.3 minutes per game, 7.8 points per game and 3.0 assists per game in his NBA career. In 42 career playoff games, he averaged 22.5 minutes, 10.1 points, and 3.1 assists per game. Egan was among the shortest players in the NBA, and was the shortest for most of his 11-year career.

== Coaching career ==
On January 18, 1972, Houston Rockets coach Tex Winter named Egan an assistant coach, making him the team's only full time assistant coach. Egan continued as a player-coach for the remainder of the season. Egan only played in four games after becoming assistant coach. Shortly before the start of the 1972–73 season the Rockets were still considering Egan as a potential reserve guard on their roster. Ultimately, Winter stated that the team would rather have Egan solely be an assistant coach and not a player-coach.

On January 21, 1973, less than two weeks before his 34th birthday, Egan replaced Winter as the Rockets' head coach. During Egan's 3 1/2 years as head coach, the Rockets were 129–152. At one point, Egan was the youngest and shortest coach in the NBA. He led the Rockets to a 41–41 record in the 1974–75 season; the first time in the team's eight year history it was not below .500. The Rockets reached one post-season, appearing in the 1975 NBA playoffs. They defeated the New York Knicks in the first round to earn the franchise's first playoff series win. The Rockets then lost in five games to the Boston Celtics in the Eastern Conference semifinals. He was fired and replaced by Tom Nissalke on April 20, 1976, after the team failed to qualify for the 1975–76 postseason with a 40–42 record.

== Media career ==
Egan became the first television color commentator to partner with Bill Worrell in broadcasting Houston Rockets games, after his coaching career.

== Legacy and honors ==
Egan was inducted into the Providence Athletic Hall of Fame in 1974. He was honored with a banner ceremony by Providence before a 2009 game against Notre Dame.

Egan was among the shortest players in the NBA during his career. When Egan died in 2022, former teammate Kevin Loughery observed that Egan's style of play was much more suited to the modern NBA game, with less emphasis on big players and more emphasis on long-distance shooting, than when Egan played in the 1960s and early 1970s. Loughery stated that Egan had confidence in his own abilities, great leaping ability, could shoot from long distance, and drive to the basket. Hall of Fame Houston Rockets guard Calvin Murphy said of Egan as a coach "'I admire Johnny, and could play for him anywhere'".

== Personal life and death ==
Egan married Joan (née Grimaldi), his high school sweetheart. They had two children (Kimberly and John Egan Jr.), and five grandchildren (Alexandra Egan Gonzalez, Briana Egan Gonzalez, George Nicolas Egan Gonzalez, John "Jet" Egan III, Elizabeth Egan). Joan died in 1998 from ovarian cancer.

After his basketball career, Egan remained in Houston, where he founded and operated an insurance business. He continued to live in Houston in his later life. After suffering a head injury in a fall in his home in May 2022, he died on July 21, 2022, at age 83.

== Head coaching record ==
Legend
Regular season	G	Games coached	W	Games won	L	Games lost	W–L %	Win–loss %
Playoffs	PG	Playoff games	PW	Playoff wins	PL	Playoff losses	PW–L %	Playoff win–loss %

Team	Year	G	W	L	W–L%	Finish	PG	PW	PL	PW–L%	Result
Houston	1972–73	35	16	19	.457	3rd in Central	–	–	–	–	Missed playoffs
Houston	1973–74	82	32	50	.390	3rd in Central	–	–	–	–	Missed playoffs
Houston	1974–75	82	41	41	.500	2nd in Central	8	3	5	.375	Lost in Conf. Semi-finals
Houston	1975–76	82	40	42	.488	3rd in Central	–	–	–	–	Missed playoffs
Career		281	129	152	.459		8	3	5	.375	
