= 1968–69 San Francisco Warriors season =

NBA professional basketball team season

- Head coach: George Lee
- Arena: Cow Palace

Results
- Record: 41–41 (.500)
- Place: Division: 3rd (Western)
- Playoff finish: West Division Semifinals (eliminated 2–4)
- Stats at Basketball Reference

The 1968–69 San Francisco Warriors season was the Warriors' 23rd season in the NBA and 7th in the San Francisco Bay Area.

== Roster ==
1968–69 San Francisco Warriors roster
Players

Pos.	No.	Player	Height	Weight	DOB	From
F	50	Bob Allen	6 ft 9 in (2.06 m)	205 lb (93 kg)		Marshall
G	16	Al Attles	6 ft 0 in (1.83 m)	175 lb (79 kg)		North Carolina A&T
F	31	Joe Ellis	6 ft 6 in (1.98 m)	175 lb (79 kg)		San Francisco
G	21	Jim King	6 ft 2 in (1.88 m)	175 lb (79 kg)		Tulsa
F	35	Rudy LaRusso	6 ft 7 in (2.01 m)	220 lb (100 kg)		Dartmouth
F/C	43	Clyde Lee	6 ft 10 in (2.08 m)	205 lb (93 kg)		Vanderbilt
G	15	Bobby Lewis	6 ft 3 in (1.91 m)	175 lb (79 kg)		North Carolina
G	23	Jeff Mullins	6 ft 4 in (1.93 m)	190 lb (86 kg)		Duke
C	54	Dale Schlueter	6 ft 10 in (2.08 m)	225 lb (102 kg)		Colorado State
F/C	42	Nate Thurmond	6 ft 11 in (2.11 m)	225 lb (102 kg)		Bowling Green
F	22	Bill Turner	6 ft 7 in (2.01 m)	220 lb (100 kg)		Akron
G	12	Ron Williams	6 ft 3 in (1.91 m)	188 lb (85 kg)		West Virginia

Coaches
Head coach
- George Lee (Michigan)

Legend
- (DP) Unsigned draft pick
- (FA) Free agent
- (S) Suspended
- Injured

== Regular season ==
=== Season standings ===
Western Division	W	L	PCT	GB	Home	Road	Neutral	Div
x-Los Angeles Lakers	55	27	.671	–	32–9	21–18	2–0	30–10
x-Atlanta Hawks	48	34	.585	7	28–12	18–21	2–1	26–14
x-San Francisco Warriors	41	41	.500	14	22–19	18–21	1–1	20–20
x-San Diego Rockets	37	45	.451	18	25–16	8–25	4–4	20–20
Chicago Bulls	33	49	.402	22	19–21	12–25	2–3	19–21
Seattle SuperSonics	30	52	.366	25	18–18	6–29	6–5	15–23
Phoenix Suns	16	66	.195	39	11–26	4–28	1–12	8–30

x – clinched playoff spot

=== Game log ===
1968–69 Game log
#	Date	Opponent	Score	High points	Record
1	October 18	San Diego	123–108	LaRusso, Thurmond (18)	0–1
2	October 19	@ Seattle	107–95	Nate Thurmond (41)	1–1
3	October 22	Phoenix	101–109	LaRusso, Thurmond (22)	2–1
4	October 26	Baltimore	106–107	Jeff Mullins (33)	3–1
5	October 29	@ New York	97–110	Rudy LaRusso (23)	3–2
6	October 30	@ Baltimore	110–112 (OT)	Jeff Mullins (27)	3–3
7	November 1	@ Atlanta	105–109	Jeff Mullins (28)	3–4
8	November 2	@ Milwaukee	101–102	Rudy LaRusso (21)	3–5
9	November 4	@ Phoenix	119–108	LaRusso, Thurmond (28)	4–5
10	November 6	New York	93–94	Clyde Lee (25)	5–5
11	November 8	@ Detroit	118–122 (OT)	Nate Thurmond (35)	5–6
12	November 9	@ Atlanta	106–113	Nate Thurmond (26)	5–7
13	November 12	Atlanta	108–123	Nate Thurmond (23)	6–7
14	November 15	Detroit	105–133	Jeff Mullins (22)	7–7
15	November 16	Los Angeles	119–112	Nate Thurmond (26)	7–8
16	November 19	@ Chicago	121–109	Nate Thurmond (41)	8–8
17	November 20	@ Cincinnati	107–113	Nate Thurmond (27)	8–9
18	November 22	@ Los Angeles	100–98	Nate Thurmond (24)	9–9
19	November 23	Seattle	119–132	Joe Ellis (32)	10–9
20	November 27	Chicago	119–106	Nate Thurmond (27)	10–10
21	November 29	Milwaukee	119–140	Clyde Lee (35)	11–10
22	November 30	Milwaukee	107–101	Jeff Mullins (33)	11–11
23	December 1	@ San Diego	105–116	Nate Thurmond (28)	11–12
24	December 3	Seattle	122–127	Jeff Mullins (27)	12–12
25	December 4	@ Phoenix	97–126	Rudy LaRusso (33)	12–13
26	December 6	@ Seattle	100–109 (OT)	LaRusso, Turner (20)	12–14
27	December 7	Seattle	115–107	Attles, King (21)	12–15
28	December 10	Atlanta	111–100	Jeff Mullins (25)	12–16
29	December 11	N Milwaukee	96–106	Rudy LaRusso (21)	12–17
30	December 13	@ Boston	108–98	Nate Thurmond (27)	13–17
31	December 14	@ Philadelphia	91–137	Bill Turner (21)	13–18
32	December 17	@ New York	99–114	Rudy LaRusso (28)	13–19
33	December 18	@ Baltimore	100–109	Jeff Mullins (30)	13–20
34	December 20	@ Los Angeles	101–133	Rudy LaRusso (18)	13–21
35	December 21	Philadelphia	94–109	Rudy LaRusso (36)	14–21
36	December 23	@ San Diego	125–95	Rudy LaRusso (30)	15–21
37	December 26	Phoenix	118–119	Bill Turner (28)	16–21
38	December 28	@ Detroit	102–131	Jeff Mullins (21)	16–22
39	December 30	@ Chicago	97–103	Rudy LaRusso (21)	16–23
40	January 1	N Cincinnati	106–101	Rudy LaRusso (25)	17–23
41	January 3	Boston	102–104	Nate Thurmond (23)	18–23
42	January 5	Boston	134–86	Ron Williams (17)	18–24
43	January 7	San Diego	113–108	Rudy LaRusso (31)	18–25
44	January 11	New York	85–77	LaRusso, Thurmond (18)	18–26
45	January 16	@ Chicago	112–99	Jeff Mullins (29)	19–26
46	January 17	@ Boston	99–102	Jeff Mullins (24)	19–27
47	January 19	@ Philadelphia	98–97	Nate Thurmond (35)	20–27
48	January 21	Cincinnati	113–107 (OT)	Rudy LaRusso (37)	20–28
49	January 24	San Diego	107–114	Ellis, LaRusso (22)	21–28
50	January 26	@ Phoenix	117–93	Nate Thurmond (25)	22–28
51	January 28	@ Cincinnati	107–100	Rudy LaRusso (39)	23–28
52	January 29	@ Detroit	133–126	Jeff Mullins (42)	24–28
53	January 30	Chicago	111–101	Rudy LaRusso (29)	24–29
54	February 1	Los Angeles	106–101 (OT)	Jeff Mullins (27)	24–30
55	February 2	@ Los Angeles	122–117 (3OT)	LaRusso, Thurmond (24)	25–30
56	February 4	Seattle	116–111	LaRusso, Mullins (25)	25–31
57	February 8	Cincinnati	117–116	Rudy LaRusso (36)	25–32
58	February 9	@ Seattle	121–120	Jeff Mullins (34)	26–32
59	February 11	@ Atlanta	92–87	Jeff Mullins (34)	27–32
60	February 12	@ Baltimore	110–120	Nate Thurmond (28)	27–33
61	February 14	@ Philadelphia	127–111	Jeff Mullins (36)	28–33
62	February 15	@ New York	92–98	Nate Thurmond (24)	28–34
63	February 16	@ Atlanta	113–106	Nate Thurmond (35)	29–34
64	February 18	Detroit	114–121	Jeff Mullins (37)	30–34
65	February 19	Philadelphia	117–134	Jeff Mullins (28)	31–34
66	February 20	@ San Diego	128–118	Jeff Mullins (33)	32–34
67	February 22	Philadelphia	129–122	Jeff Mullins (37)	32–35
68	February 24	Chicago	119–108	Rudy LaRusso (34)	32–36
69	February 25	Chicago	99–101	Nate Thurmond (30)	33–36
70	February 28	Cincinnati	115–131	Rudy LaRusso (28)	34–36
71	March 1	Phoenix	119–118	Nate Thurmond (24)	34–37
72	March 2	@ Los Angeles	92–107	Rudy LaRusso (13)	34–38
73	March 4	Boston	95–99	Jeff Mullins (23)	35–38
74	March 5	Baltimore	107–114	Nate Thurmond (34)	36–38
75	March 7	Baltimore	130–135 (OT)	Jeff Mullins (40)	37–38
76	March 9	@ Boston	89–138	Bobby Lewis (19)	37–39
77	March 10	@ Milwaukee	123–106	Rudy LaRusso (33)	38–39
78	March 12	Los Angeles	85–97	Jeff Mullins (25)	39–39
79	March 14	Detroit	110–114	Jeff Mullins (32)	40–39
80	March 18	Atlanta	128–115	Jeff Mullins (28)	40–40
81	March 21	Milwaukee	100–103	Jeff Mullins (26)	41–40
82	March 22	New York	117–90	Jim King (19)	41–41

== Playoffs ==
1969 playoff game log
Division Semifinals: 2–4 (home: 0–3; road: 2–1)

Game	Date	Team	Score	High points	High rebounds	High assists	Location Attendance	Series
1	March 26	@ Los Angeles	W 99–94	Jeff Mullins (36)	Nate Thurmond (27)	Al Attles (9)	The Forum; 10,697	1–0
2	March 28	@ Los Angeles	W 107–101	Rudy LaRusso (29)	Nate Thurmond (28)	Jim King (7)	The Forum; 15,119	2–0
3	March 31	Los Angeles	L 98–115	Nate Thurmond (22)	Nate Thurmond (20)	Nate Thurmond (5)	Oakland–Alameda County Coliseum Arena; 13,221	2–1
4	April 2	Los Angeles	L 88–103	Ron Williams (16)	Nate Thurmond (15)	Nate Thurmond (4)	Cow Palace; 14,812	2–2
5	April 4	@ Los Angeles	L 98–103	Joe Ellis (23)	Bill Turner (14)	Nate Thurmond (6)	The Forum; 17,309	2–3
6	April 5	Los Angeles	L 78–118	Jeff Mullins (21)	Nate Thurmond (14)	Jeff Mullins (5)	Cow Palace; 8,924	2–4

1969 schedule

== Awards and records ==
- Nate Thurmond, NBA All-Defensive First Team
- Rudy LaRusso, NBA All-Defensive Second Team
