= 1966 NBA playoffs =

Postseason tournament

Tournament details
- Dates: March 23–April 28, 1966
- Season: 1965–66
- Teams: 6

Final positions
- Champions: Boston Celtics (9th title)
- Runner-up: Los Angeles Lakers
- Semifinalists: St. Louis Hawks; Philadelphia 76ers

The 1966 NBA playoffs was the postseason tournament of the National Basketball Association's 1965–66 season. The tournament concluded with the Eastern Division champion Boston Celtics defeating the Western Division champion Los Angeles Lakers 4 games to 3 in the NBA Finals.

The Celtics won their eighth consecutive NBA title and ninth overall, defeating the Lakers in the Finals for a fifth straight time.

This was the last NBA playoffs under the "top team in each division gets a first-round bye" format established in 1955, although teams receiving a bye would be reused in 1975, and strictly for division winners from 1977–1983 (albeit in a four-round playoff format). the 1967 NBA playoffs featured an eight-team tournament with no first-round byes.

== Bracket ==
Division Semifinals
E3	Cincinnati	2
E2	Boston	3
W3	St. Louis	3
W2	Baltimore	0

Division Finals
Eastern Division
E1	Philadelphia*	1
E2	Boston	4
Western Division
W1	Los Angeles*	4
W3	St. Louis	3

NBA Finals
E2	Boston	4
W1	Los Angeles*	3

- * Division winner
- Bold Series winner
- Italic Team with home-court advantage in NBA Finals

== Division Semifinals ==
=== Eastern Division Semifinals ===
==== (2) Boston Celtics vs. (3) Cincinnati Royals ====
March 23

Boxscore

Cincinnati Royals 107, Boston Celtics 103
Scoring by quarter: 24–17, 29–31, 26–19, 28–36
Pts: Smith, Robertson 26 each Rebs: Jerry Lucas 27; Asts: Oscar Robertson 3	Pts: Bill Russell 22; Rebs: Bill Russell 29; Asts: Russell, Havlicek 4 each
Cincinnati leads series, 1–0

Boston Garden, Boston, Massachusetts
Attendance: 9,510

March 26

Boxscore

Boston Celtics 132, Cincinnati Royals 125
Scoring by quarter: 35–42, 33–29, 25–28, 39–26
Pts: Sam Jones 42; Rebs: Bill Russell 16; Asts: K. C. Jones 9	Pts: Oscar Robertson 35; Rebs: Jerry Lucas 24; Asts: Oscar Robertson 11
Series tied, 1–1

Cincinnati Gardens, Cincinnati, Ohio
Attendance: 10,027

March 27

Boxscore

Cincinnati Royals 113, Boston Celtics 107
Scoring by quarter: 31–27, 26–29, 25–26, 31–25
Pts: Robertson, Lucas 27 each Rebs: Jerry Lucas 16; Asts: Adrian Smith 6	Pts: John Havlicek 36; Rebs: Bill Russell 25; Asts: K. C. Jones 6
Cincinnati leads series, 2–1

Boston Garden, Boston, Massachusetts
Attendance: 13,571

March 30

Boxscore

Boston Celtics 120, Cincinnati Royals 103
Scoring by quarter: 31–27, 27–21, 29–24, 33–31
Pts: Sam Jones 32; Rebs: Bill Russell 26; Asts: John Havlicek 8	Pts: Oscar Robertson 34; Rebs: Jerry Lucas 17; Asts: Oscar Robertson 11
Series tied, 2–2

Cincinnati Gardens, Cincinnati, Ohio
Attendance: 12,107

April 1

Boxscore

Cincinnati Royals 103, Boston Celtics 112
Scoring by quarter: 31–26, 25–35, 23–28, 24–23
Pts: Oscar Robertson 37; Rebs: Jerry Lucas 17; Asts: Oscar Robertson 9	Pts: Sam Jones 34; Rebs: Bill Russell 31; Asts: Bill Russell 11
Boston wins series, 3–2

Boston Garden, Boston, Massachusetts
Attendance: 13,909

This was the third playoff meeting between these two teams, with the Celtics winning both prior meetings.

Previous playoff series
Boston leads 2–0 in all-time playoff series

1963

Boston Celtics 4, Cincinnati Royals 3

1963 Eastern Division Finals

1964

Boston Celtics 4, Cincinnati Royals 1

1964 Eastern Division Finals

=== Western Division Semifinals ===
==== (2) Baltimore Bullets vs. (3) St. Louis Hawks ====
March 24

Boxscore

St. Louis Hawks 113, Baltimore Bullets 111
Scoring by quarter: 27–22, 31–31, 23–26, 32–32
Pts: Joe Caldwell 33; Rebs: Bill Bridges 19; Asts: Richie Guerin 12	Pts: Don Ohl 38; Rebs: Green, Howell 11 each Asts: Johnny Egan 9
St. Louis leads series, 1–0

Baltimore Civic Center, Baltimore, Maryland
Attendance: 3,587

March 27

Boxscore

St. Louis Hawks 105, Baltimore Bullets 100
Scoring by quarter: 26–24, 19–32, 30–23, 30–21
Pts: Richie Guerin 25; Rebs: Bill Bridges 19; Asts: Richie Guerin 8	Pts: Jim Barnes 27; Rebs: Bob Ferry 17; Asts: Johnny Egan 8
St. Louis leads series, 2–0

Baltimore Civic Center, Baltimore, Maryland
Attendance: 13,104

March 30

Boxscore

Baltimore Bullets 112, St. Louis Hawks 121
Scoring by quarter: 29–28, 31–31, 20–34, 32–28
Pts: Don Ohl 32; Rebs: Bailey Howell 12; Asts: Johnny Egan 6	Pts: Bill Bridges 32; Rebs: Bill Bridges 20; Asts: Lenny Wilkens 10
St. Louis wins series, 3–0

Kiel Auditorium, St. Louis, Missouri
Attendance: 7,135

This was the second playoff meeting between these two teams, with the Bullets winning the first meeting.

Previous playoff series
Baltimore leads 1–0 in all-time playoff series

1965

St. Louis Hawks 1, Baltimore Bullets 3

1965 Western Division Semifinals

== Division Finals ==
=== Eastern Division Finals ===
==== (1) Philadelphia 76ers vs. (2) Boston Celtics ====
April 3

Boxscore

Boston Celtics 115, Philadelphia 76ers 96
Scoring by quarter: 27–24, 25–24, 30–22, 33–26
Pts: Sam Jones 29; Rebs: Bill Russell 18; Asts: three players 4 each	Pts: Wilt Chamberlain 25; Rebs: Wilt Chamberlain 32; Asts: Chamberlain, W. Jones 5 each
Boston leads series, 1–0

Municipal Auditorium, Philadelphia, Pennsylvania
Attendance: 6,563

April 6

Boxscore

Philadelphia 76ers 93, Boston Celtics 114
Scoring by quarter: 20–27, 24–31, 26–27, 23–29
Pts: Wilt Chamberlain 23; Rebs: Wilt Chamberlain 25; Asts: Billy Cunningham 4	Pts: Sam Jones 23; Rebs: Bill Russell 29; Asts: K. C. Jones 11
Boston leads series, 2–0

Boston Garden, Boston, Massachusetts
Attendance: 13,909

April 7

Boxscore

Boston Celtics 105, Philadelphia 76ers 111
Scoring by quarter: 22–31, 26–27, 31–27, 26–26
Pts: John Havlicek 27; Rebs: Bill Russell 23; Asts: Sam Jones 6	Pts: Wilt Chamberlain 31; Rebs: Wilt Chamberlain 27; Asts: Hal Greer 9
Boston leads series, 2–1

Municipal Auditorium, Philadelphia, Pennsylvania
Attendance: 10,454

April 10

Boxscore

Philadelphia 76ers 108, Boston Celtics 114 (OT)
Scoring by quarter: 26–28, 28–21, 22–21, 24–30, Overtime: 8–14
Pts: Hal Greer 25; Rebs: Wilt Chamberlain 33; Asts: Hal Greer 4	Pts: John Havlicek 27; Rebs: Bill Russell 30; Asts: Russell, Havlicek 7 each
Boston leads series, 3–1

Boston Garden, Boston, Massachusetts
Attendance: 13,909

April 12

Boxscore

Boston Celtics 120, Philadelphia 76ers 112
Scoring by quarter: 32–25, 29–26, 20–21, 39–40
Pts: John Havlicek 32; Rebs: Bill Russell 31; Asts: Bill Russell 6	Pts: Wilt Chamberlain 46; Rebs: Wilt Chamberlain 34; Asts: Chet Walker 8
Boston wins series, 4–1

Municipal Auditorium, Philadelphia, Pennsylvania
Attendance: 8,623

This was the 10th playoff meeting between these two teams, with the Celtics winning five of the first nine meetings.

Previous playoff series
Boston leads 5–4 in all-time playoff series

1953

Boston Celtics 2, Syracuse Nationals 0

1953 Eastern Division Semifinals

1954

Boston Celtics 0, Syracuse Nationals 2

1954 Eastern Division Round Robin Semifinals

1954

Boston Celtics 0, Syracuse Nationals 2

1954 Eastern Division Finals

1955

Boston Celtics 1, Syracuse Nationals 3

1955 Eastern Division Finals

1956

Boston Celtics 1, Syracuse Nationals 2

1956 Eastern Division Semifinals

1957

Boston Celtics 3, Syracuse Nationals 0

1957 Eastern Division Finals

1959

Boston Celtics 4, Syracuse Nationals 3

1959 Eastern Division Finals

1961

Boston Celtics 4, Syracuse Nationals 1

1961 Eastern Division Finals

1965

Boston Celtics 4, Philadelphia 76ers 3

1965 Eastern Division Finals

=== Western Division Finals ===
==== (1) Los Angeles Lakers vs. (3) St. Louis Hawks ====
April 1

Boxscore

St. Louis Hawks 106, Los Angeles Lakers 129
Scoring by quarter: 31–37, 30–31, 30–26, 15–35
Pts: Beaty, Guerin 22 each Rebs: Zelmo Beaty 14; Asts: Richie Guerin 8	Pts: Jerry West 28; Rebs: Elgin Baylor 15; Asts: Jerry West 12
Los Angeles leads series, 1–0

Los Angeles Memorial Sports Arena, Los Angeles, California
Attendance: 11,509

April 3

Boxscore

St. Louis Hawks 116, Los Angeles Lakers 125
Scoring by quarter: 27–30, 24–31, 29–30, 36–34
Pts: Zelmo Beaty 36; Rebs: Bill Bridges 16; Asts: Lenny Wilkens 9	Pts: Elgin Baylor 42; Rebs: Elgin Baylor 14; Asts: Elgin Baylor 9
Los Angeles leads series, 2–0

Los Angeles Memorial Sports Arena, Los Angeles, California
Attendance: 14,896

April 6

Boxscore

Los Angeles Lakers 113, St. Louis Hawks 120
Scoring by quarter: 27–31, 29–31, 32–34, 25–24
Pts: Jerry West 32; Rebs: Jerry West 11; Asts: Jerry West 8	Pts: Bill Bridges 27; Rebs: Bill Bridges 17; Asts: Richie Guerin 8
Los Angeles leads series, 2–1

Kiel Auditorium, St. Louis, Missouri
Attendance: 8,318

April 9

Boxscore

Los Angeles Lakers 107, St. Louis Hawks 95
Scoring by quarter: 23–23, 24–28, 30–18, 30–26
Pts: Jerry West 42; Rebs: Elgin Baylor 13; Asts: three players 4 each	Pts: Zelmo Beaty 22; Rebs: Zelmo Beaty 19; Asts: Richie Guerin 7
Los Angeles leads series, 3–1

Kiel Auditorium, St. Louis, Missouri
Attendance: 9,569

April 10

Boxscore

St. Louis Hawks 112, Los Angeles Lakers 100
Scoring by quarter: 32–30, 27–25, 27–19, 26–26
Pts: Lenny Wilkens 29; Rebs: Zelmo Beaty 19; Asts: Lenny Wilkens 12	Pts: Jerry West 31; Rebs: Elgin Baylor 17; Asts: Elgin Baylor 4
Los Angeles leads series, 3–2

Los Angeles Memorial Sports Arena, Los Angeles, California
Attendance: 14,297

April 13

Boxscore

Los Angeles Lakers 127, St. Louis Hawks 131
Scoring by quarter: 36–36, 32–33, 36–36, 23–26
Pts: Jerry West 38; Rebs: Elgin Baylor 13; Asts: West, Hazzard 5 each	Pts: Bill Bridges 29; Rebs: Bridges, Beaty 11 each Asts: Richie Guerin 11
Series tied, 3–3

Kiel Auditorium, St. Louis, Missouri
Attendance: 8,614

April 15

Boxscore

St. Louis Hawks 121, Los Angeles Lakers 130
Scoring by quarter: 28–27, 30–30, 33–34, 30–39
Pts: Cliff Hagan 29; Rebs: Bill Bridges 13; Asts: Richie Guerin 5	Pts: Jerry West 35; Rebs: Elgin Baylor 11; Asts: Baylor, LaRusso 7 each
Los Angeles wins series, 4–3

Los Angeles Memorial Sports Arena, Los Angeles, California
Attendance: 15,200

This was the eighth playoff meeting between these two teams, with the Hawks winning five of the first seven meetings.

Previous playoff series
St. Louis leads 5–2 in all-time playoff series

1956

St. Louis Hawks 2, Minneapolis Lakers 1

1956 Western Division Semifinals

1957

St. Louis Hawks 3, Minneapolis Lakers 0

1957 Western Division Finals

1959

St. Louis Hawks 2, Minneapolis Lakers 4

1959 Western Division Finals

1960

St. Louis Hawks 4, Minneapolis Lakers 3

1960 Western Division Finals

1961

St. Louis Hawks 4, Los Angeles Lakers 3

1961 Western Division Finals

1963

St. Louis Hawks 3, Los Angeles Lakers 4

1963 Western Division Finals

1964

St. Louis Hawks 3, Los Angeles Lakers 2

1964 Western Division Semifinals

== NBA Finals: (E2) Boston Celtics vs. (W1) Los Angeles Lakers ==
April 17

Boxscore

Los Angeles Lakers 133, Boston Celtics 129 (OT)
Scoring by quarter: 20–34, 41–28, 34–37, 26–22, Overtime: 12–8
Pts: Jerry West 41; Rebs: Elgin Baylor 20; Asts: Gail Goodrich 5	Pts: Bill Russell 28; Rebs: Bill Russell 26; Asts: Sam Jones 9
Los Angeles leads series, 1–0

Boston Garden, Boston, Massachusetts
Attendance: 13,909

April 19

Boxscore

Los Angeles Lakers 109, Boston Celtics 129
Scoring by quarter: 25–35, 22–36, 35–30, 27–28
Pts: Jerry West 18; Rebs: Elgin Baylor 14; Asts: Walt Hazzard 5	Pts: Havlicek, S. Jones 21 each Rebs: Bill Russell 24; Asts: John Havlicek 7
Series tied, 1–1

Boston Garden, Boston, Massachusetts
Attendance: 13,909

April 20

Boxscore

Boston Celtics 120, Los Angeles Lakers 106
Scoring by quarter: 25–29, 32–27, 35–19, 28–31
Pts: Sam Jones 36; Rebs: Bill Russell 19; Asts: Sanders, K. C. Jones 5 each	Pts: Jerry West 34; Rebs: Elgin Baylor 15; Asts: Jim King 6
Boston leads series, 2–1

Los Angeles Memorial Sports Arena, Los Angeles, California
Attendance: 15,101

April 22

Boxscore

Boston Celtics 122, Los Angeles Lakers 117
Scoring by quarter: 31–27, 35–29, 34–33, 22–28
Pts: John Havlicek 32; Rebs: Bill Russell 18; Asts: Larry Siegfried 7	Pts: Jerry West 45; Rebs: Elgin Baylor 12; Asts: Jerry West 10
Boston leads series, 3–1

Los Angeles Memorial Sports Arena, Los Angeles, California
Attendance: 15,251

April 24

Boxscore

Los Angeles Lakers 121, Boston Celtics 117
Scoring by quarter: 37–23, 27–35, 26–31, 31–28
Pts: Elgin Baylor 41; Rebs: Elgin Baylor 16; Asts: Jerry West 5	Pts: Bill Russell 32; Rebs: Bill Russell 28; Asts: Siegfried, K. C. Jones 6 each
Boston leads series, 3–2

Boston Garden, Boston, Massachusetts
Attendance: 13,909

April 26

Boxscore

Boston Celtics 115, Los Angeles Lakers 123
Scoring by quarter: 29–32, 29–36, 32–21, 25–34
Pts: John Havlicek 27; Rebs: Bill Russell 23; Asts: K. C. Jones 6	Pts: Jerry West 32; Rebs: Elgin Baylor 14; Asts: Jerry West 7
Series tied, 3–3

Los Angeles Memorial Sports Arena, Los Angeles, California
Attendance: 15,069

April 28

Boxscore

Los Angeles Lakers 93, Boston Celtics 95
Scoring by quarter: 20–27, 18–26, 22–23, 33–19
Pts: Jerry West 36; Rebs: Elgin Baylor 14; Asts: West, Hazzard 3 each	Pts: Bill Russell 25; Rebs: Bill Russell 32; Asts: Sanders, K. C. Jones 3 each
Boston wins series, 4–3

Boston Garden, Boston, Massachusetts
Attendance: 13,909

This was the fifth playoff meeting between these two teams, with the Celtics winning the first four meetings.

Previous playoff series
Boston leads 4–0 in all-time playoff series

1959

Boston Celtics 4, Minneapolis Lakers 0

1959 NBA Finals

1962

Boston Celtics 4, Los Angeles Lakers 3

1962 NBA Finals

1963

Boston Celtics 4, Los Angeles Lakers 2

1963 NBA Finals

1965

Boston Celtics 4, Los Angeles Lakers 1

1965 NBA Finals

== See also ==
- 1966 NBA Finals
- 1965–66 NBA season
