= Bill Turner (basketball) =

American basketball player (1944–2023)

Personal information
- Born: February 18, 1944 Cleveland, Ohio, U.S.
- Died: October 14, 2023 (aged 79)
- Listed height: 6 ft 7 in (2.01 m)
- Listed weight: 220 lb (100 kg)

Career information
- High school: Central (Akron, Ohio)
- College: Akron (1963–1967)
- NBA draft: 1967: 3rd round, 27th overall pick
- Drafted by: San Francisco Warriors
- Playing career: 1967–1973
- Position: Small forward / power forward
- Number: 12, 22, 13, 34, 20, 30

Career history
- 1967–1969: San Francisco Warriors
- 1969–1970: Cincinnati Royals
- 1971–1972: San Francisco/Golden State Warriors
- 1972: Portland Trail Blazers
- 1972–1973: Los Angeles Lakers

Career NBA statistics
- Points: 1,597 (5.4 ppg)
- Rebounds: 1,039 (3.5 rpg)
- Assists: 167 (0.6 apg)
- Stats at NBA.com
- Stats at Basketball Reference

William R. Turner III (February 18, 1944 – October 14, 2023) was an American professional National Basketball Association (NBA) player. Turner played college basketball for the Akron Zips.

Turner died on October 14, 2023, at the age of 79.

== Career statistics ==
Legend
GP	Games played	GS	Games started	MPG	Minutes per game
FG%	Field goal percentage	3P%	3-point field goal percentage	FT%	Free throw percentage
RPG	Rebounds per game	APG	Assists per game	SPG	Steals per game
BPG	Blocks per game	PPG	Points per game	**Bold**	Career high

=== NBA ===
==== Regular season ====
Year	Team	GP	MPG	FG%	FT%	RPG	APG	PPG
1967–68	San Francisco	42	11.5	.433	.600	3.7	.4	4.1
1968–69	San Francisco	**79**	18.8	.415	**.761**	**4.8**	**.8**	**7.8**
1969–70	San Francisco	3	**25.0**	**.529**	.500	4.7	.3	7.7
1969–70	Cincinnati	69	15.9	.417	.752	4.2	.6	7.2
1970–71	San Francisco	18	11.1	.317	.650	2.3	.4	3.6
1971–72	Golden State	62	9.6	.392	.755	2.1	.4	2.9
1972–73	Portland	2	4.0	.333	–	1.0	.0	2.0
1972–73	L.A. Lakers	19	6.2	.327	.571	1.3	.6	2.0
Career		294	13.8	.407	.728	3.5	.6	5.4

==== Playoffs ====
Year	Team	GP	MPG	FG%	FT%	RPG	APG	PPG
1968	San Francisco	**9**	**16.4**	.475	.750	3.2	1.1	5.2
1969	San Francisco	6	16.0	.371	.636	**4.2**	**1.2**	**5.5**
1971	San Francisco	2	9.0	.200	.667	1.5	.5	3.0
1972	Golden State	3	3.0	**1.000**	–	1.0	.0	1.3
1973	L.A. Lakers	2	6.5	.400	**1.000**	1.0	.0	3.0
Career		22	12.9	.425	.710	2.8	.8	4.4
