= 1968–69 Los Angeles Lakers season =

NBA professional basketball team season

- Division champions
- Head coach: Butch van Breda Kolff
- General manager: Fred Schaus
- Owner: Jack Kent Cooke
- Arena: The Forum

Results
- Record: 55–27 (.671)
- Place: Division: 1st (Western)
- Playoff finish: NBA Finals (lost to Celtics 3–4)
- Stats at Basketball Reference

Local media
- Television: KTLA
- Radio: KNX

The 1968–69 Los Angeles Lakers season was the Lakers' 21st season in the NBA and ninth season in Los Angeles. This season saw the Lakers acquire Wilt Chamberlain from the Philadelphia 76ers in a trade that sent Jerry Chambers, Archie Clark, and Darrall Imhoff to the 76ers. The team also lost future star Gail Goodrich to the Phoenix Suns via expansion draft.

The Lakers would make it to the NBA Finals, but would lose to the Boston Celtics in seven games despite being the heavy favorites. This marked the Lakers' seventh consecutive defeat to the Celtics in the NBA Finals.

Jerry West, who averaged nearly 38 points per game in the Finals, became the inaugural recipient of the Finals Most Valuable Player award. To date he is the only player in NBA history to win the award as a member of the losing team.

== Offseason ==
=== NBA draft ===
Round	Pick	Player	Position	Nationality	College
1	11	Bill Hewitt	PF	United States	USC

== Roster ==
1968–69 Los Angeles Lakers roster
Players

Pos.	No.	Player	Height	Weight	DOB	From
SG	30	Cliff Anderson	6 ft 2 in (1.88 m)	200 lb (91 kg)	1944-09-07	Saint Joseph's
SF	22	Elgin Baylor	6 ft 5 in (1.96 m)	225 lb (102 kg)	1934-09-16	Seattle
PF	52	Jay Carty	6 ft 8 in (2.03 m)	220 lb (100 kg)	1941-07-04	Oregon State
C	13	Wilt Chamberlain	7 ft 1 in (2.16 m)	275 lb (125 kg)	1936-08-21	Kansas
PF	31	Mel Counts	7 ft 0 in (2.13 m)	230 lb (104 kg)	1941-10-16	Oregon State
SG	12	Freddie Crawford	6 ft 4 in (1.93 m)	189 lb (86 kg)	1941-12-33	St. Bonaventure
PG	21	Johnny Egan	5 ft 11 in (1.80 m)	180 lb (82 kg)	1939-01-31	Providence
SG	24	Keith Erickson	6 ft 5 in (1.96 m)	195 lb (88 kg)	1944-04-19	UCLA
SF	33	Tom Hawkins	6 ft 5 in (1.96 m)	210 lb (95 kg)	1936-12-22	Notre Dame
PF	30	Bill Hewitt	6 ft 7 in (2.01 m)	210 lb (95 kg)	1944-08-08	USC
PG	44	Jerry West	6 ft 3 in (1.91 m)	175 lb (79 kg)	1938-05-28	West Virginia

Coaches
Head coach
- Butch van Breda Kolff

Legend
- (DP) Unsigned draft pick
- (FA) Free agent
- (S) Suspended
- Injured

Roster
Updated: October 17, 1968

== Regular season ==
=== Season standings ===
Western Division	W	L	PCT	GB	Home	Road	Neutral	Div
x-Los Angeles Lakers	55	27	.671	–	32–9	21–18	2–0	30–10
x-Atlanta Hawks	48	34	.585	7	28–12	18–21	2–1	26–14
x-San Francisco Warriors	41	41	.500	14	22–19	18–21	1–1	20–20
x-San Diego Rockets	37	45	.451	18	25–16	8–25	4–4	20–20
Chicago Bulls	33	49	.402	22	19–21	12–25	2–3	19–21
Seattle SuperSonics	30	52	.366	25	18–18	6–29	6–5	15–23
Phoenix Suns	16	66	.195	39	11–26	4–28	1–12	8–30

=== Game log ===
1968–69 game log
#	Date	Opponent	Score	High points	Record
1	October 18	@ Philadelphia	96–114	Elgin Baylor (36)	0–1
2	October 19	@ New York	118–96	Wilt Chamberlain (29)	1–1
3	October 22	@ Cincinnati	103–107	Elgin Baylor (35)	1–2
4	October 23	@ Detroit	110–117	Elgin Baylor (31)	1–3
5	October 25	Baltimore	111–117	Jerry West (34)	2–3
6	October 27	San Diego	116–152	Elgin Baylor (32)	3–3
7	October 29	Atlanta	124–125	Elgin Baylor (28)	4–3
8	November 1	Chicago	114–101	Wilt Chamberlain (29)	4–4
9	November 3	@ Phoenix	127–109	Elgin Baylor (40)	5–4
10	November 5	@ Chicago	112–109 (OT)	Elgin Baylor (31)	6–4
11	November 6	N Milwaukee	115–128	Elgin Baylor (33)	7–4
12	November 8	New York	100–102	Jerry West (29)	8–4
13	November 10	New York	109–130	Elgin Baylor (26)	9–4
14	November 15	San Diego	119–127	Jerry West (34)	10–4
15	November 16	@ San Francisco	119–112	Jerry West (37)	11–4
16	November 17	Seattle	94–105	Elgin Baylor (26)	12–4
17	November 19	Boston	106–116	Elgin Baylor (30)	13–4
18	November 22	San Francisco	100–98	Jerry West (23)	13–5
19	November 24	Chicago	100–103	Elgin Baylor (35)	14–5
20	November 26	@ New York	100–104	Wilt Chamberlain (23)	14–6
21	November 28	@ Philadelphia	107–122	Elgin Baylor (32)	14–7
22	November 29	@ Boston	93–92	Elgin Baylor (19)	15–7
23	December 1	Milwaukee	112–119	Elgin Baylor (34)	16–7
24	December 3	Phoenix	108–122	Wilt Chamberlain (35)	17–7
25	December 5	@ Baltimore	90–108	Jerry West (20)	17–8
26	December 6	@ Atlanta	99–94	Elgin Baylor (30)	18–8
27	December 7	@ Chicago	81–90	Jerry West (27)	18–9
28	December 8	San Diego	118–132	Wilt Chamberlain (35)	19–9
29	December 13	Atlanta	105–103	Elgin Baylor (25)	19–10
30	December 14	@ Seattle	136–120	Johnny Egan (26)	20–10
31	December 15	Seattle	114–115	Jerry West (28)	21–10
32	December 17	Cincinnati	108–112	Jerry West (36)	22–10
33	December 20	San Francisco	101–133	Elgin Baylor (25)	23–10
34	December 22	Philadelphia	99–102	Jerry West (27)	24–10
35	December 25	@ Phoenix	119–99	Jerry West (26)	25–10
36	December 26	@ Detroit	95–94	Jerry West (29)	26–10
37	December 28	@ Chicago	86–93	Jerry West (27)	26–11
38	December 29	Detroit	108–111	Jerry West (34)	27–11
39	December 30	@ San Diego	131–126 (OT)	Jerry West (40)	28–11
40	December 31	Detroit	127–107	Jerry West (29)	28–12
41	January 3	@ Philadelphia	101–130	Keith Erickson (20)	28–13
42	January 4	@ Atlanta	121–111	Keith Erickson (30)	29–13
43	January 7	@ Baltimore	100–93	Elgin Baylor (30)	30–13
44	January 10	@ Boston	82–88	Elgin Baylor (21)	30–14
45	January 11	@ Atlanta	100–104	Elgin Baylor (25)	30–15
46	January 17	Cincinnati	107–128	Chamberlain, West (27)	31–15
47	January 19	Cincinnati	117–132	Elgin Baylor (34)	32–15
48	January 21	@ Milwaukee	122–105	Jerry West (44)	33–15
49	January 22	@ Detroit	115–116	Jerry West (28)	33–16
50	January 24	@ Atlanta	106–110	Elgin Baylor (34)	33–17
51	January 26	N Cincinnati	126–113	Wilt Chamberlain (60)	34–17
52	January 28	Chicago	118–125	Jerry West (28)	35–17
53	January 29	@ San Diego	122–120	Wilt Chamberlain (30)	36–17
54	January 31	Milwaukee	104–105	Elgin Baylor (33)	37–17
55	February 1	@ San Francisco	106–101 (OT)	Elgin Baylor (34)	38–17
56	February 2	San Francisco	122–117 (3OT)	Mel Counts (31)	38–18
57	February 3	@ Seattle	107–114	Wilt Chamberlain (33)	38–19
58	February 7	Philadelphia	109–106	Jerry West (34)	38–20
59	February 8	@ Phoenix	122–104	Elgin Baylor (30)	39–20
60	February 9	Phoenix	116–134	Wilt Chamberlain (66)	40–20
61	February 12	@ Seattle	109–92	Wilt Chamberlain (32)	41–20
62	February 14	San Diego	109–115	Johnny Egan (28)	42–20
63	February 16	@ Milwaukee	97–106	Wilt Chamberlain (29)	42–21
64	February 18	@ New York	113–109	Wilt Chamberlain (31)	43–21
65	February 19	@ Baltimore	88–110	Wilt Chamberlain (26)	43–22
66	February 21	Boston	124–102	Wilt Chammberlain (35)	43–23
67	February 23	Philadelphia	125–121	Wilt Chamberlain (36)	43–24
68	February 25	Seattle	111–114 (OT)	Mel Counts (23)	44–24
69	February 28	Phoenix	117–121	Elgin Baylor (31)	45–24
70	March 1	@ San Diego	119–113	Elgin Baylor (37)	46–24
71	March 2	San Francisco	92–107	Jerry West (20)	47–24
72	March 4	Baltimore	116–108	Jerry West (29)	47–25
73	March 7	Boston	99–105 (OT)	Elgin Baylor (34)	48–25
74	March 9	Baltimore	109–120	Jerry West (34)	49–25
75	March 11	Detroit	101–137	Wilt Chamberlain (34)	50–25
76	March 12	@ San Francisco	85–97	Jerry West (28)	50–26
77	March 14	Milwaukee	103–111	Jerry West (23)	51–26
78	March 16	@ Boston	108–73	Bill Hewitt (19)	52–26
79	March 18	@ Chicago	93–92	Jerry West (28)	53–26
80	March 19	@ Cincinnati	128–136 (OT)	Baylor, West (28)	53–27
81	March 21	Atlanta	103–116	Elgin Baylor (21)	54–27
82	March 23	New York	111–128	Jerry West (34)	55–27

== Playoffs ==
1969 playoff game log
Division Semi-finals: 4–2 (home: 1–2; road: 3–0)

Game	Date	Team	Score	High points	High rebounds	High assists	Location Attendance	Series
1	March 26	San Francisco	L 94–99	Jerry West (36)	Wilt Chamberlain (30)	Jerry West (7)	The Forum; 10,697	0–1
2	March 28	San Francisco	L 101–107	Jerry West (36)	Wilt Chamberlain (17)	Jerry West (11)	The Forum; 15,119	0–2
3	March 31	@ San Francisco	W 115–98	Jerry West (25)	Wilt Chamberlain (28)	Jerry West (9)	Oakland–Alameda County Coliseum Arena; 13,221	1–2
4	April 2	@ San Francisco	W 103–88	Jerry West (36)	Wilt Chamberlain (14)	Jerry West (5)	Cow Palace; 14,812	2–2
5	April 4	San Francisco	W 103–98	Jerry West (29)	Wilt Chamberlain (27)	Jerry West (13)	The Forum; 17,309	3–2
6	April 5	@ San Francisco	W 118–78	Jerry West (29)	Wilt Chamberlain (25)	Jerry West (8)	Cow Palace; 8,924	4–2

Division finals: 4–1 (home: 3–0; road: 1–1)

Game	Date	Team	Score	High points	High rebounds	High assists	Location Attendance	Series
1	April 11	@ Atlanta	W 95–93	Jerry West (25)	Wilt Chamberlain (29)	Baylor, Egan (6)	The Forum; 16,190	1–0
2	April 13	Atlanta	W 104–102	Wilt Chamberlain (23)	Wilt Chamberlain (29)	Johnny Egan (11)	The Forum; 15,136	2–0
3	April 15	@ Atlanta	L 86–99	Johnny Egan (19)	Wilt Chamberlain (22)	West, Baylor (4)	Alexander Memorial Coliseum; 7,140	2–1
4	April 17	@ Atlanta	W 100–85	Wilt Chamberlain (25)	Wilt Chamberlain (19)	Jerry West (5)	Alexander Memorial Coliseum; 7,140	3–1
5	April 20	Atlanta	W 104–96	Elgin Baylor (29)	Wilt Chamberlain (29)	Elgin Baylor (12)	The Forum; 16,273	4–1

NBA Finals: 3–4 (home: 3–1; road: 0–3)

Game	Date	Team	Score	High points	High rebounds	High assists	Location Attendance	Series
1	April 23	Boston	W 120–118	Jerry West (53)	Wilt Chamberlain (23)	Jerry West (10)	The Forum; 17,554	1–0
2	April 25	Boston	W 118–112	Jerry West (41)	Wilt Chamberlain (19)	Egan, West (8)	The Forum; 17,559	2–0
3	April 27	@ Boston	L 105–111	Jerry West (24)	Wilt Chamberlain (26)	Jerry West (6)	Boston Garden; 14,037	2–1
4	April 29	@ Boston	L 88–89	Jerry West (40)	Wilt Chamberlain (31)	West, Baylor (4)	Boston Garden; 15,128	2–2
5	May 1	Boston	W 117–104	Jerry West (39)	Wilt Chamberlain (31)	Jerry West (9)	The Forum; 17,553	3–2
6	May 3	@ Boston	L 90–99	West, Baylor (26)	Wilt Chamberlain (18)	Wilt Chamberlain (4)	Boston Garden; 15,128	3–3
7	May 5	Boston	L 106–108	Jerry West (42)	Wilt Chamberlain (27)	Jerry West (12)	The Forum; 17,568	3–4

1969 schedule

== Awards ==
- Jerry West, NBA Finals Most Valuable Player Award
- Elgin Baylor, All-NBA First Team
- Jerry West, All-NBA Second Team
- Jerry West, NBA All-Defensive Second Team
- Elgin Baylor, NBA All-Star Game
- Jerry West, NBA All-Star Game
- Wilt Chamberlain, NBA All-Star Game
- Bill Hewitt, NBA All-Rookie Team 1st Team
