= John Block (basketball) =

American basketball player (born 1944)

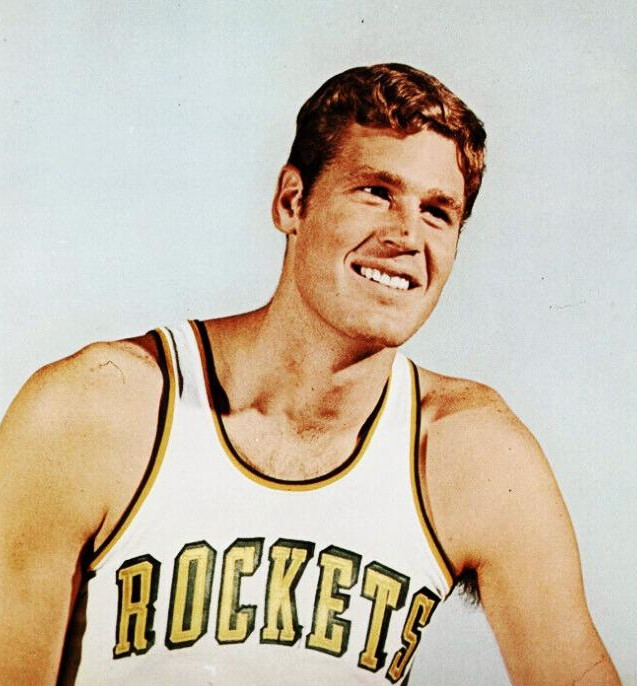
- Block circa 1969

Personal information
- Born: April 16, 1944 (age 82) Los Angeles, California, U.S.
- Listed height: 6 ft 9 in (2.06 m)
- Listed weight: 207 lb (94 kg)

Career information
- High school: Glendale (Glendale, California)
- College: USC (1963–1966)
- NBA draft: 1966: 3rd round, 27th overall pick
- Drafted by: Los Angeles Lakers
- Playing career: 1966–1976
- Position: Power forward / center
- Number: 34, 41, 35

Career history

Playing
- 1966–1967: Los Angeles Lakers
- 1967–1971: San Diego Rockets
- 1971–1972: Milwaukee Bucks
- 1972–1973: Philadelphia 76ers
- 1973–1974: Kansas City–Omaha Kings
- 1974: New Orleans Jazz
- 1974–1976: Chicago Bulls

Coaching
- 1980–1983: UC San Diego
- 1986–1991: Gordon (Massachusetts)
- 1992–1997: Bethany College (California)
- 1997–2002: Point Loma Nazarene

Career highlights
- NBA All-Star (1973); 2× First-team All-AAWU (1965, 1966)

Career NBA statistics
- Points: 7,106 (11.9 ppg)
- Rebounds: 3,965 (6.6 rpg)
- Assists: 805 (1.3 apg)
- Stats at NBA.com
- Stats at Basketball Reference

John William Block Jr. (born April 16, 1944) is an American former professional basketball player. A 6 ft 10 in (2.08 m) power forward/center from the University of Southern California (USC), Block spent 10 seasons in the National Basketball Association (NBA) as a member of the Los Angeles Lakers (1966–1967), San Diego Rockets (1967–1971), Milwaukee Bucks (1971–1972), Philadelphia 76ers (1972–1973), Kansas City–Omaha Kings (1973–1974), New Orleans Jazz (1974), and Chicago Bulls (1974–1976). Block had his strongest season in 1967–68, when he averaged 20.2 points and 11.0 rebounds for the Rockets, who had just entered the NBA as an expansion team. Block appeared in the 1973 NBA All-Star Game, and registered 7,106 total points and 3,965 rebounds in his career.

== Early life ==
Block was born on April 16, 1944, in Los Angeles. He attended Glendale High School, where he played center on the school's basketball team as a 6 ft 7 in (2.01 m) sophomore, 6 ft 8 in (2.03 m) junior, and 6 ft 9 in (2.06 m) senior. In 1961, he was named Most Valuable Player in the Pacific Shores Basketball Tournament. In 1962, he was second in the voting for the California Interscholastic Federation's (CIF) Player of the Year award, losing in a close vote to Douglas Bolcom. The All-Southern California Board of Basketball selected Block as first-team All-CIF at center in 1962. Glendale reached the semifinal round of the CIF's Class AAA division playoffs that year.

== College career ==
Block first attended Glendale College, where he led the school's basketball team during the 1962–63 season, averaging over 20 points per game. Glendale won the December 1962 Sam Barry Memorial Basketball Tournament, and Block was named center on the all-tournament team.

He then attended the University of Southern California (USC). As a 6 ft 9 in sophomore center in the 1963–64 season, he averaged 13.6 points and eight rebounds per game. The next season he averaged 16 points and 9.1 rebounds per game. As a senior (1965–66), he averaged 25.2 points and 10.8 rebounds per game, leading both USC and the Athletic Association of Western Universities (AAWU; later the PAC-12) in both categories. He also led the AAWU in free throws attempted and made. He was named first-team All-AAWU in 1965, as a junior. He was unanimously selected as the 1966 first-team All-AAWU center, as a senior. He was named an honorable mention for All-American by the Associated Press in 1966.

== Professional career ==
He has been reported at 6 ft 10 in (2.08 m) as an NBA forward/center. He has also been reported as being 6 ft 9 in when he played in the NBA.

=== Los Angeles Lakers and San Diego Rockets ===
The Los Angeles Lakers selected Block in the third round of the 1966 NBA draft, 27th overall. Block played sparingly as a Lakers' rookie, averaging 2.9 points and two rebounds in 5.4 minutes per game. On the advice of Lakers teammate Rudy LaRusso, Block closely studied Jerry West in all West did while Block was with the Lakers that season.

The Lakers left Block unprotected in the 1967 expansion draft and he was selected by the San Diego Rockets for their inaugural season. Block became the Rockets' starting center, and led the team in scoring (20.2 points per game) in its first year. He also averaged 11 rebounds per game, playing nearly 35 minutes per game. Coach Jack McMahon believed Block was more suited to play forward at 6 ft 9 in, 207 lb (93.9 kg), in the style of Bob Pettit, but needed to play Block at center. Block only played in 52 games that season, however, after suffering a broken bone in his shooting hand in late January 1968 that ended his season.

After future Hall of Fame center Elvin Hayes joined the Rockets for the 1968–69 season, McMahon moved Block to power forward. Block played in 78 games, averaging nearly 32 minutes, 15.3 points and nine rebounds per game. The team's record went from 15–67 in its first year, to 35–47 in its second year. The Rockets lost in six games to the Atlanta Hawks in the Western Division playoff semifinals. Block averaged 12.4 points and 2.8 rebounds per game, in five playoff games in that series. In the Rockets' two-point victory in Game 4, Block scored 20 points coming in as a reserve.

Block played in all 82 games with the Rockets in 1969–70, averaging 26.2 minutes, 14.5 points, 7.4 rebounds and 1.7 assists per game. He played one more season with the Rockets (1970–71), averaging 9.6 points and 6.1 rebounds in 20.1 minutes per game.

=== Milwaukee Bucks, Philadelphia 76ers and Kansas City-Omaha Kings ===
The Rockets traded Block to the Milwaukee Bucks for Dick Cunningham in September 1971, who had served as the backup to the Bucks' future Hall of Fame center Kareem Abdul-Jabbar the previous season. Block played one season with the Bucks, averaging 8.5 points and 5.2 rebounds in 19.3 minutes per game. Block said the most memorable game of his career was on January 9, 1972, when the Bucks ended the Lakers 33-game winning streak. Playing as a reserve, Block had 17 points and 10 rebounds. Lakers guard, and future Hall of Fame coach, Pat Riley said Block was a big difference maker in the Bucks winning the game. While Abdul-Jabbar scored 39 points and had 20 rebounds in the 120–104 Buck's victory, television color analyst and Hall of Fame center Bill Russell said Block was the principal reason the Bucks led in the game, because of his offensive rebounding.

In the first round of the 1972 playoffs, the Bucks defeated the Golden State Warriors in five games, with Block averaging 16.4 minutes, 6.8 points and 5.4 rebounds per game. The Bucks lost in the Western Division finals to the Lakers in six games. Block averaged 12.5 minutes, 3.5 points and 4.7 rebounds per game.

In late July 1972, the Bucks sent Block to the Philadelphia 76ers to complete an earlier trade for Wally (Wali) Jones. Through that trade, Block joined a 76ers team that is often considered the worst team in NBA history. Block started 48 games for the 76ers at power forward during the 1972–73 season, averaging 17.9 points, 9.2 rebounds and two assists in 32.5 minutes per game. He was selected to the Eastern Division All-Star Team, his only all-star selection. The 76ers were 4–47 when they fired their head coach and traded Block to the Kansas City–Omaha Kings on January 25, 1973 for Tom Van Arsdale and a third round draft pick.

Block played in 25 games for the Kings that season, sharing time with power forwards Ron Riley, Johnny Green and Toby Kimball (who had been Block's Rockets teammate). Block averaged less than 20 minutes per game with the Kings, with 9.0 points and 4.8 rebounds per game averages. Block played all 82 games with the Kings in 1973–74. He averaged 8.7 points and 4.7 rebounds in 21.7 minutes per game.

=== New Orleans Jazz and Chicago Bulls ===
Block was taken by the New Orleans Jazz in the 1974 expansion draft. He had a hamstring injury early in the season that limited his play. He played in only four games for the Jazz, before being traded to the Chicago Bulls for guard Rick Adelman in mid-November. He played in 50 games for the Bulls as a power forward, averaging 17.6 minutes, 8.1 points and 4.3 rebounds per game. His career ended the following season. He played in only two games, and was injured and unable to play when he was waived in October 1975 by the Bulls.

Over his ten years in the NBA, Block scored 7,106 total points, and had 3,965 rebounds and 805 assists over 597 regular season games. He averaged 24 minutes, 11.9 points and 6.6 rebounds per game.

== Coaching career ==
Block was a college coach for over 20 years. In October 1976, he became an assistant basketball coach at San Diego State University, where he served in that role for two seasons. He became the head coach of the University of California, San Diego's men's basketball team for three seasons (1980 to 1983). He became an assistant coach on the men's basketball team at Oral Roberts University in the 1983–84 season, and was promoted to first assistant the following season (1984–85), his final season there.

In May 1986, he was named athletic director and head basketball coach at Gordon College, in Wenham, Massachusetts. He coached the men's basketball team for five seasons, from 1986 to 1991. The Gordon team was 7–18 the season before Block was hired. After going 7–20 in Block's first season as coach, the team was 54–54 over the next four seasons. In June 1991, Bethany College in Santa Cruz, California hired Block as athletic director and men's head basketball coach. He took the job in part because of the opportunities it provided his daughter Allison to live in an area where she could develop as a volleyball player. He coached Bethany for seven seasons.

In 1997, he was named men's basketball head coach at Point Loma Nazarene University, located in San Diego. He coached there four full seasons (1997 to 2001) and part of the 2001–2002 season. His best season came in the 1999-2000 season, when the team went 28–7.

== Honors ==
Block is a member of the Southern California Basketball Hall of Fame.

== Personal life ==
Block spent the Summer of 1965 living in Harlem, New York, as part of a short-term mission sponsored by the Hollywood Presbyterian Church and Young Life. He played in pickup games at Rucker Park, where he occasionally played on the same team with playground basketball legend Earl Manigault, among others. One of the New York teens his church later sponsored to attend college in Los Angeles lived on the Hollywood Presbyterian campus. That person was friendly with Kareem Abdul-Jabbar (then known as Lew Alcindor), who had likewise come to Los Angeles to attend UCLA. Block met Abdul-Jabbar in Los Angeles through this connection in 1965 on Hollywood Presbyterian's campus and the two would also play in pickup basketball games together. When Block joined the Bucks in September of 1971, he and NBA teammate Abdul-Jabbar had already known each other for six years.

While coaching at Oral Roberts University, Block, his wife and two children lived on a 15-acre ranch in Tulsa, Oklahoma where they raised and bred Arabian horses. He was founder of the Oakridge Christian Sports Camp. Block and his wife moved to San Diego while he was coaching at Point Loma Nazarene. In 2022, he published a book about his life, Building Block.

== NBA career statistics ==
Legend
GP	Games played	GS	Games started	MPG	Minutes per game
FG%	Field goal percentage	3P%	3-point field goal percentage	FT%	Free throw percentage
RPG	Rebounds per game	APG	Assists per game	SPG	Steals per game
BPG	Blocks per game	PPG	Points per game	**Bold**	Career high

=== Regular season ===
Year	Team	GP	GS	MPG	FG%	3P%	FT%	RPG	APG	SPG	BPG	PPG
1966–67	Los Angeles	22	-	5.4	.385	-	.706	2.0	0.2	-	-	2.9
1967–68	San Diego	52	-	**34.7**	.423	-	**.802**	**11.0**	1.4	-	-	**20.2**
1968–69	San Diego	78	-	31.9	.422	-	.748	9.0	**1.8**	-	-	15.3
1969–70	San Diego	**82**	-	26.2	.442	-	.782	7.4	1.7	-	-	14.5
1970–71	San Diego	73	-	20.1	.420	-	.785	6.1	1.3	-	-	9.6
1971–72	Milwaukee	79	-	19.3	.440	-	.749	5.2	1.2	-	-	8.5
1972–73	Philadelphia	48	-	32.5	.441	-	.781	9.2	2.0	-	-	17.9
1972–73	Kansas City–Omaha	25	-	19.3	.444	-	.842	4.8	0.8	-	-	9.0
1973–74	Kansas City–Omaha	**82**	-	21.7	.434	-	.796	4.7	1.1	0.8	0.4	8.7
1974–75	New Orleans	4	-	14.3	.310	-	.900	4.5	1.8	**1.0**	0.3	6.8
1974–75	Chicago	50	-	17.6	.473	-	.784	4.3	0.9	0.8	**0.6**	8.1
1975–76	Chicago	2	-	3.5	**.500**	-	.000	1.0	0.0	0.5	0.0	2.0
Career		597	-	24.0	.433	-	.778	6.6	1.3	0.8	0.5	11.9

=== Playoffs ===
Year	Team	GP	GS	MPG	FG%	3P%	FT%	RPG	APG	SPG	BPG	PPG
1966–67	Los Angeles	1	-	1.0	.000	-	.000	0.0	0.0	-	-	0.0
1968–69	San Diego	5	-	**19.4**	**.533**	-	.778	2.8	**0.6**	-	-	**12.4**
1971–72	Milwaukee	**11**	-	14.2	.385	-	**.833**	**5.0**	0.5	-	-	5.0
1974–75	Chicago	4	-	8.5	.400	-	.333	1.5	0.0	**1.0**	0.0	3.3
Career		21	-	13.7	.446	-	.769	3.6	0.4	1.0	0.0	6.2
