= Art Williams =

American basketball player

Personal information
- Born: September 29, 1939 Bonham, Texas, U.S.
- Died: September 27, 2018 (aged 78) San Diego, California, U.S.
- Listed height: 6 ft 1 in (1.85 m)
- Listed weight: 180 lb (82 kg)

Career information
- High school: San Diego (San Diego, California)
- College: San Diego CC (1959–1961); Cal Poly Pomona (1961–1962)
- NBA draft: 1963: undrafted
- Playing career: 1967–1975
- Position: Point guard
- Number: 14, 7, 8, 30

Career history
- 1967–1970: San Diego Rockets
- 1970–1974: Boston Celtics
- 1974–1975: San Diego Conquistadors

Career highlights
- NBA champion (1974)

Career NBA and ABA statistics
- Points: 2,892 (5.3 ppg)
- Rebounds: 1,712 (3.1 rpg)
- Assists: 2,397 (4.4 apg)
- Stats at NBA.com
- Stats at Basketball Reference

Arthur T. Williams (September 29, 1939 – September 27, 2018), also known as Hambone Williams, was an American professional basketball player.

Williams played basketball for two seasons at San Diego City College from 1959 to 1961 and for the Cal Poly Pomona Broncos during the 1962–63 season.

Williams played seven seasons (1967–1974) in the National Basketball Association as a member of the San Diego Rockets and Boston Celtics. Williams became the second player in NBA history to record a triple-double within his first four NBA games, joining Oscar Robertson. He averaged 5.3 points per game in his career and won an NBA Championship with Boston in 1974. He received his nickname in junior high when someone called out, "hambone" and he turned around.

Williams also played briefly with the San Diego Conquistadors of the American Basketball Association in 1974–1975.

After suffering a stroke, Williams died on September 27, 2018, at the age of 78.

== Career statistics ==
Legend
GP	Games played	GS	Games started	MPG	Minutes per game
FG%	Field goal percentage	3P%	3-point field goal percentage	FT%	Free throw percentage
RPG	Rebounds per game	APG	Assists per game	SPG	Steals per game
BPG	Blocks per game	PPG	Points per game	**Bold**	Career high
†	Won an NBA championship

=== NBA/ABA ===
==== Regular season ====
Year	Team	GP	MPG	FG%	3P%	FT%	RPG	APG	STL	BLK	PPG
1967–68	S.D. Rockets	79	22.0	.369		.685	3.6	4.9			**8.1**
1968–69	S.D. Rockets	79	**25.2**	.383		.705	**4.6**	**6.6**			7.1
1969–70	S.D. Rockets	80	19.3	.407		.746	3.7	6.3			5.8
1970–71	Boston	74	15.4	.455		.723	2.8	3.1			4.9
1971–72	Boston	**81**	16.4	.475		.756	3.2	4.0			5.1
1972–73	Boston	**81**	12.0	.421		.768	2.2	2.9			3.2
1973–74†	Boston	67	9.2	.435		**.844**	1.7	2.4	.7	.0	2.6
1974–75	S.D. Conquistadors (ABA)	7	12.7	**.667**	–	–	1.7	2.9	**1.0**	.0	2.3
Career (NBA)		541	17.2	.409		.729	3.1	4.4	.7	.0	5.3
Career (overall)		548	17.2	.410	–	.729	3.1	4.4	.7	.0	5.3

==== Playoffs ====
Year	Team	GP	MPG	FG%	FT%	RPG	APG	SPG	BPG	PPG
1969	S.D. Rockets	6	**17.0**	**.480**	.429	**2.8**	**5.3**			4.5
1972	Boston	11	15.7	.391	.750	2.5	3.0			**5.9**
1973	Boston	10	15.6	.447	.750	2.7	4.1			4.8
1974†	Boston	**12**	8.0	.370	**.875**	1.9	2.4	.6	.0	2.3
Career		39	13.5	.417	.721	2.4	3.5	.6	.0	4.3

== See also ==
- List of National Basketball Association players with most assists in a game
