= Harry Barnes (basketball) =

American basketball player

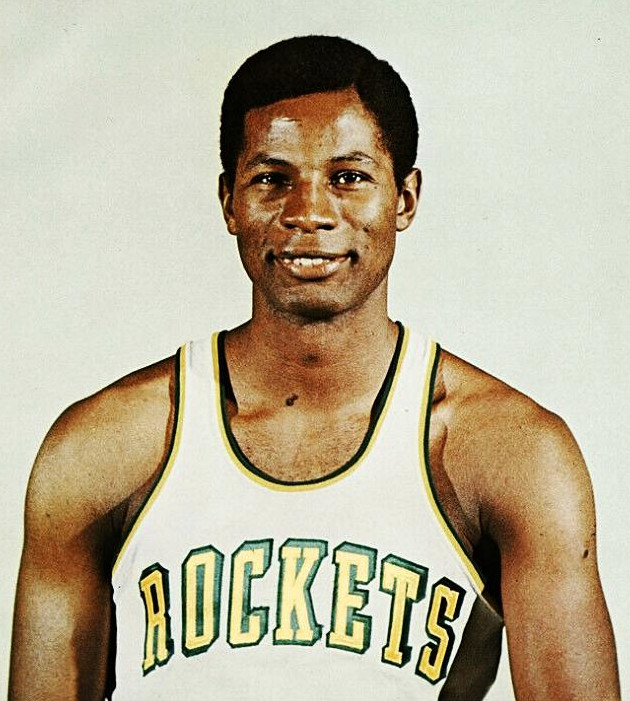
- Barnes, circa 1969

Personal information
- Born: July 25, 1945 (age 81) Youngstown, Ohio, U.S.
- Listed height: 6 ft 3 in (1.91 m)
- Listed weight: 205 lb (93 kg)

Career information
- High school: Boston Tech
- College: Northeastern (1965–1968)
- NBA draft: 1968: 4th round, 37th overall pick
- Drafted by: San Diego Rockets
- Playing career: 1968–1969
- Position: Small forward
- Number: 30

Career history
- 1968–1969: San Diego Rockets
- Stats at NBA.com
- Stats at Basketball Reference

Harry J. Barnes (born July 25, 1945) is an American former professional basketball player.

Barnes was born in Youngstown, Ohio, and moved to the South End of Boston around the age of 11, where he started playing basketball at the South End Boys Club. He attended Boston Tech, where he earned all-Scholastic honors.

Barnes played college basketball for Northeastern University. As a senior, he averaged 16.9 points and 7.8 rebounds per game while shooting 47 percent from the field. He scored 1,114 points in his career, which ranked third in program history at the time of his graduation.

He was selected by the San Diego Rockets in the 4th round (37th pick overall) of the 1968 NBA draft.

He played for the Rockets (1968–69) in the NBA for 22 games.

== Career statistics ==
Legend
GP	Games played	GS	Games started	MPG	Minutes per game
FG%	Field goal percentage	3P%	3-point field goal percentage	FT%	Free throw percentage
RPG	Rebounds per game	APG	Assists per game	SPG	Steals per game
BPG	Blocks per game	PPG	Points per game	**Bold**	Career high

=== NBA ===
==== Regular season ====
Year	Team	GP	MPG	FG%	FT%	RPG	APG	PPG
1968–69	San Diego	22	5.7	.281	.538	1.2	.2	2.0
