= Dwight Waller =

American basketball player (1945–2021)

Personal information
- Born: October 5, 1945 Brownsville, Tennessee, U.S.
- Died: March 12, 2021 (aged 75)
- Listed height: 6 ft 6 in (1.98 m)
- Listed weight: 220 lb (100 kg)

Career information
- High school: Carver (Brownsville, Tennessee)
- College: Tennessee State (1964–1967)
- NBA draft: 1968: 10th round, 131st overall pick
- Drafted by: Atlanta Hawks
- Position: Small forward
- Number: 16, 34, 50, 24

Career history
- 1967–1968: Tennessee State Tigers (AAU)
- 1968–1969: Atlanta Hawks
- 1969–1970, 1971–1972: Denver Rockets
- Stats at NBA.com
- Stats at Basketball Reference

Dwight Waller Sr. (October 5, 1945 – March 12, 2021) was an American professional basketball player. He played in the National Basketball Association for the Atlanta Hawks and in the American Basketball Association for the Denver Rockets.

Waller graduated from Tennessee State University in 1967. He spent the 1967–68 season playing for Nashville, Tennessee's Amateur Athletic Union team.

== Career statistics ==
Legend
GP	Games played	GS	Games started	MPG	Minutes per game
FG%	Field goal percentage	3P%	3-point field goal percentage	FT%	Free throw percentage
RPG	Rebounds per game	APG	Assists per game	SPG	Steals per game
BPG	Blocks per game	PPG	Points per game	**Bold**	Career high

=== NBA/ABA ===
==== Regular season ====
Year	Team	GP	MPG	FG%	3P%	FT%	RPG	APG	PPG
1968–69	Atlanta	**11**	2.6	.222		.429	.9	.1	.6
1969–70	Denver (ABA)	7	**12.4**	.417	.000	**.474**	**5.4**	**.6**	**4.1**
1971–72	Denver (ABA)	2	5.0	**.500**	–	–	2.5	.5	2.0
Career (ABA)		9	10.8	.429	.000	.474	4.8	.6	3.7
Career (overall)		20	6.3	.378	.000	.462	2.7	.3	2.0
