= 1968–69 Chicago Bulls season =

NBA professional basketball team season

- Head coach: Dick Motta
- General manager: Dick Klein
- Owner: Dick Klein
- Arena: Chicago Stadium

Results
- Record: 33–49 (.402)
- Place: Division: 5th (Western)
- Playoff finish: Did not qualify
- Stats at Basketball Reference

Local media
- Television: WGN-TV (Jack Brickhouse, Vince Lloyd)
- Radio: WGN (Vince Lloyd, Roy Leonard)

The 1968–69 Chicago Bulls season was the Bulls' third season in the NBA. After two consecutive playoff appearances, the Bulls missed the postseason for the first time in franchise history.

== Draft picks ==
Round	Pick	Player	Position	Nationality	College
1	4	Tom Boerwinkle	C	United States	Tennessee
2	17	Loy Petersen	G	United States	Oregon State
2	19	Ron Dunlap	C	United States	Illinois
3	31	Dave Newmark	C	United States	Columbia
4	39	Mike Lynn	F	United States	UCLA
5	53	Jim Tillman	F	United States	Loyola Chicago
6	67	Kenn Barnett	C	United States	Delaware
7	81	Willie Davis	C	United States	North Texas
8	95	Lloyd Higgins	F	United States	Pasadena
9	109	Corky Bell	F	United States	Loyola Chicago
10	123	Mike Weaver	F	United States	Northwestern
11	137	Jim McGonigle	G	United States	Iowa State
12	150	John Lallensack	F	United States	Wisconsin–Oshkosh
13	163	Herm Gilliam	G/F	United States	Purdue
14	174	Dave Carr	G	United States	Washington
15	183	Mickey McCarty	F	United States	TCU
16	191	Fred Holden	G	United States	Louisville
17	199	Dave Benedict	G	United States	Central Washington State
18	205	Bob Zoretich	F	United States	DePaul
19	209	Rich Mason	F	United States	Indiana State
20	212	Pee Wee Kirkland	G	United States	Norfolk State
21	214	Ronald Horton	F	United States	Delaware State

== Roster ==
1968–69 Chicago Bulls roster
Players

Pos.	No.	Player	Height	Weight	DOB	From
C	18	Tom Boerwinkle	7 ft 0 in (2.13 m)	265 lb (120 kg)	1945–08–23	Tennessee
F	19	Bob Boozer	6 ft 8 in (2.03 m)	215 lb (98 kg)	1937–04–26	Kansas State
F	16	Barry Clemens	6 ft 6 in (1.98 m)	210 lb (95 kg)	1943–05–01	Ohio Wesleyan
G	11	Clem Haskins	6 ft 3 in (1.91 m)	195 lb (88 kg)	1943–07–11	Western Kentucky
F	10	Bob Love	6 ft 8 in (2.03 m)	215 lb (98 kg)	1942–12–08	Southern
C	12	Dave Newmark	7 ft 0 in (2.13 m)	240 lb (109 kg)	1946–09–11	Columbia
G	15	Loy Petersen	6 ft 5 in (1.96 m)	205 lb (93 kg)	1945–07–26	Oregon State
G	4	Jerry Sloan	6 ft 5 in (1.96 m)	195 lb (88 kg)	1942–03–28	Evansville
F	7	Jim Washington	6 ft 6 in (1.98 m)	210 lb (95 kg)	1943–07–01	Villanova
G	8	Bob Weiss	6 ft 2 in (1.88 m)	180 lb (82 kg)	1942–05–07	Penn State

Coaches
Head coach
- Dick Motta

Legend
- (DP) Unsigned draft pick
- (FA) Free agent
- (S) Suspended
- Injured

Roster
Updated: January 31, 1969

== Regular season ==
Before the season, Johnny Kerr left Chicago to join the expansion Phoenix Suns, and Dick Motta became the Bulls' head coach after leaving Weber State, where he had compiled a 120–33 record in six Division I seasons and won three Big Sky championships.

=== Season standings ===
Western Division	W	L	PCT	GB	Home	Road	Neutral	Div
x-Los Angeles Lakers	55	27	.671	–	32–9	21–18	2–0	30–10
x-Atlanta Hawks	48	34	.585	7	28–12	18–21	2–1	26–14
x-San Francisco Warriors	41	41	.500	14	22–19	18–21	1–1	20–20
x-San Diego Rockets	37	45	.451	18	25–16	8–25	4–4	20–20
Chicago Bulls	33	49	.402	22	19–21	12–25	2–3	19–21
Seattle SuperSonics	30	52	.366	25	18–18	6–29	6–5	15–23
Phoenix Suns	16	66	.195	39	11–26	4–28	1–12	8–30

x – clinched playoff spot

=== Game log ===
1968–69 Game log
#	Date	Opponent	Score	High points	Record
1	October 15	@ New York	100–96	Flynn Robinson (32)	1–0
2	October 16	@ Milwaukee	89–84	Flynn Robinson (23)	2–0
3	October 19	Boston	106–96	Flynn Robinson (20)	2–1
4	October 23	@ Atlanta	91–106	Jim Washington (18)	2–2
5	October 26	@ Philadelphia	118–122	Flynn Robinson (36)	2–3
6	October 29	N Boston	103–97	Flynn Robinson (22)	3–3
7	October 31	@ Phoenix	103–112	Bob Boozer (23)	3–4
8	November 1	@ Los Angeles	114–101	Clem Haskins (24)	4–4
9	November 2	@ Seattle	95–101	Bob Boozer (23)	4–5
10	November 3	@ San Diego	107–121	Bob Boozer (22)	4–6
11	November 5	Los Angeles	112–109 (OT)	Jerry Sloan (25)	4–7
12	November 6	@ Cincinnati	122–133	Flynn Robinson (27)	4–8
13	November 7	Seattle	105–120	Bob Boozer (26)	5–8
14	November 9	Cincinnati	110–104	Flynn Robinson (26)	5–9
15	November 12	San Diego	108–115	Clem Haskins (29)	6–9
16	November 16	@ New York	97–119	Clem Haskins (27)	6–10
17	November 19	San Francisco	121–109	Clem Haskins (29)	6–11
18	November 21	Milwaukee	111–120	Boozer, Haskins (25)	7–11
19	November 22	N New York	114–107	Jim Washington (28)	7–12
20	November 23	Atlanta	114–96	Clem Haskins (22)	7–13
21	November 24	@ Los Angeles	100–103	Bob Boozer (17)	7–14
22	November 26	@ Seattle	98–99	Sloan, Washington (22)	7–15
23	November 27	@ San Francisco	119–106	Jim Washington (29)	8–15
24	November 29	@ San Diego	110–89	Bob Boozer (27)	9–15
25	November 30	Phoenix	96–100	Jerry Sloan (23)	10–15
26	December 1	@ Baltimore	100–110	Jerry Sloan (29)	10–16
27	December 3	San Diego	108–103	Bob Boozer (33)	10–17
28	December 5	Philadelphia	109–92	Bob Boozer (33)	10–18
29	December 7	Los Angeles	81–90	Jerry Sloan (28)	11–18
30	December 10	Detroit	83–100	Jerry Sloan (19)	12–18
31	December 13	New York	94–83	Bob Boozer (22)	12–19
32	December 17	Atlanta	87–83	Bob Boozer (21)	12–20
33	December 19	Milwaukee	111–113	Bob Boozer (25)	13–20
34	December 20	N Baltimore	102–125	Boozer, Haskins, Sloan, Washington (14)	13–21
35	December 21	Boston	102–94	Boerwinkle, Boozer (16)	13–22
36	December 25	@ Cincinnati	98–103	Jim Washington (18)	13–23
37	December 26	Cincinnati	96–104	Jerry Sloan (23)	14–23
38	December 28	Los Angeles	86–93	Bob Boozer (26)	15–23
39	December 29	@ Milwaukee	102–97	Jim Washington (25)	16–23
40	December 30	San Francisco	97–103	Clem Haskins (20)	17–23
41	January 2	Atlanta	106–88	Bob Boozer (27)	17–24
42	January 4	Phoenix	92–103	Bob Boozer (33)	18–24
43	January 6	N Cincinnati	106–104	Bob Boozer (25)	18–25
44	January 7	New York	101–102	Clem Haskins (23)	19–25
45	January 11	Seattle	86–119	Boozer, Weiss (19)	20–25
46	January 16	San Francisco	112–99	Bob Boozer (23)	20–26
47	January 18	San Diego	102–107 (OT)	Clem Haskins (30)	21–26
48	January 19	@ Detroit	111–120	Bob Boozer (25)	21–27
49	January 21	Baltimore	116–93	Tom Boerwinkle (19)	21–28
50	January 22	Boston	94–95	Bob Boozer (21)	22–28
51	January 24	@ Phoenix	106–117	Bob Boozer (25)	22–29
52	January 26	@ San Diego	95–111	Clem Haskins (20)	22–30
53	January 28	@ Los Angeles	118–125	Boozer, Haskins (24)	22–31
54	January 30	@ San Francisco	111–101	Bob Boozer (25)	23–31
55	January 31	Detroit	103–102	Bob Boozer (24)	23–32
56	February 2	@ Philadelphia	104–112	Bob Boozer (25)	23–33
57	February 3	@ Baltimore	122–132	Bob Boozer (27)	23–34
58	February 4	Milwaukee	107–98	Bob Boozer (20)	23–35
59	February 5	@ Detroit	120–108	Jerry Sloan (23)	24–35
60	February 7	New York	105–98	Bob Boozer (19)	24–36
61	February 8	@ Atlanta	97–106	Bob Boozer (23)	24–37
62	February 11	Baltimore	124–116	Jerry Sloan (27)	24–38
63	February 13	Detroit	101–120	Clem Haskins (21)	25–38
64	February 15	Cincinnati	111–101	Bob Boozer (31)	25–39
65	February 18	@ Seattle	113–114	Clem Haskins (26)	25–40
66	February 21	@ Phoenix	133–121	Bob Boozer (28)	26–40
67	February 24	@ San Francisco	119–108	Boozer, Haskins (29)	27–40
68	February 25	@ San Francisco	99–101	Bob Boozer (28)	27–41
69	February 26	@ Seattle	124–122	Bob Boozer (24)	28–41
70	March 2	@ Boston	92–99	Jerry Sloan (36)	28–42
71	March 4	Philadelphia	113–114	Bob Boozer (31)	29–42
72	March 5	@ Milwaukee	124–108	Jerry Sloan (43)	30–42
73	March 6	N Phoenix	117–125 (OT)	Boozer, Sloan (27)	31–42
74	March 7	@ Philadelphia	113–131	Tom Boerwinkle (23)	31–43
75	March 11	Atlanta	90–102	Jim Washington (26)	32–43
76	March 12	@ Atlanta	90–109	Boozer, Sloan (18)	32–44
77	March 13	Philadelphia	113–106	Jerry Sloan (20)	32–45
78	March 15	Seattle	83–101	Jerry Sloan (30)	33–45
79	March 18	Los Angeles	93–92	Bob Boozer (29)	33–46
80	March 19	@ Boston	92–104	Boerwinkle, Boozer, Haskins (14)	33–47
81	March 21	Baltimore	115–103	Boozer, Sloan (23)	33–48
82	March 23	@ Detroit	114–158	Bob Boozer (23)	33–49

== Player statistics ==
Legend
GP	Games played	GS	Games started	MPG	Minutes per game
FG%	Field-goal percentage	3P%	3-point field-goal percentage	FT%	Free-throw percentage
RPG	Rebounds per game	APG	Assists per game	SPG	Steals per game
BPG	Blocks per game	PPG	Points per game

== Awards and records ==
- Jerry Sloan, NBA All-Defensive First Team
- Jerry Sloan, NBA All-Star Game
