= Toby Kimball =

American basketball player (1942–2017)

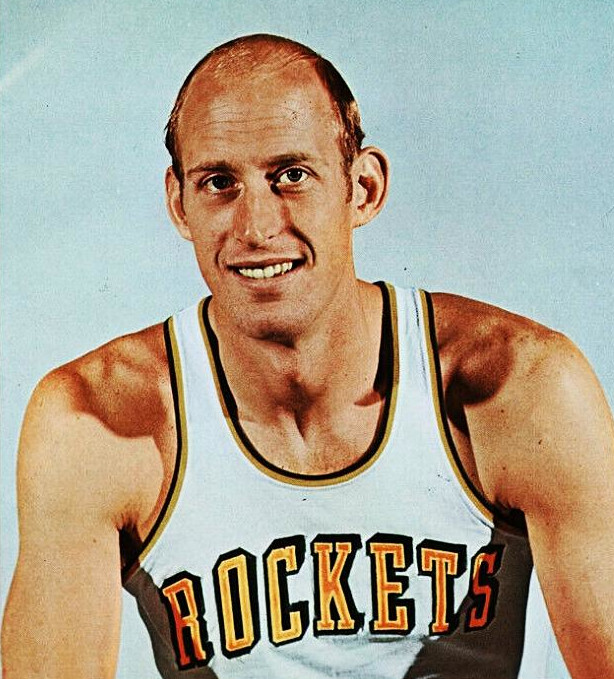
- Kimball with the San Diego Rockets, c. 1969

Personal information
- Born: September 7, 1942 Framingham, Massachusetts, U.S.
- Died: May 2, 2017 (aged 74) La Jolla, California, U.S.
- Listed height: 6 ft 8 in (2.03 m)
- Listed weight: 220 lb (100 kg)

Career information
- High school: Belmont Hill School (Belmont, Massachusetts)
- College: UConn (1962–1965)
- NBA draft: 1965: 3rd round, 26th overall pick
- Drafted by: Boston Celtics
- Playing career: 1965–1975
- Position: Power forward / center
- Number: 26, 7, 18

Career history
- 1965–1966: Ignis Varese
- 1966–1967: Boston Celtics
- 1967–1971: San Diego Rockets
- 1971–1972: Milwaukee Bucks
- 1972–1973: Kansas City–Omaha Kings
- 1973–1974: Philadelphia 76ers
- 1974–1975: New Orleans Jazz

Career highlights
- NCAA rebounding leader (1965)

Career NBA statistics
- Points: 3,470 (6.1 ppg)
- Rebounds: 3,870 (6.8 rpg)
- Assists: 571 (1.0 apg)
- Stats at NBA.com
- Stats at Basketball Reference

Thomas "Toby" Kimball (September 7, 1942 – May 2, 2017) was an American professional basketball player from Framingham, Massachusetts.

As 6'8" power forward/center at the University of Connecticut, Kimball averaged 18.4 points and 17.9 rebounds over three seasons. He played in the NBA from 1966 to 1975 as a member of the Boston Celtics, San Diego Rockets, Milwaukee Bucks, Kansas City Kings, Philadelphia 76ers and New Orleans Jazz. Kimball averaged 6.1 points and 6.8 rebounds over his NBA career. His best season was his second, in which he averaged a double double (11.0 points and 11.7 rebounds).

Kimball was inducted into the University of Connecticut's "Huskies of Honor" in 2006. His son confirmed via social media that Kimball died on May 2, 2017.

== NBA career statistics ==
Legend
GP	Games played	GS	Games started	MPG	Minutes per game
FG%	Field goal percentage	3P%	3-point field goal percentage	FT%	Free throw percentage
RPG	Rebounds per game	APG	Assists per game	SPG	Steals per game
BPG	Blocks per game	PPG	Points per game	**Bold**	Career high

=== Regular season ===
Year	Team	GP	GS	MPG	FG%	3P%	FT%	RPG	APG	SPG	BPG	PPG
1966–67	Boston	38	–	5.8	.361	–	.675	3.8	0.3	–	–	2.6
1967–68	San Diego	**81**	–	**31.1**	.396	–	.592	**11.7**	**1.8**	–	–	**11.0**
1968–69	San Diego	76	–	22.1	.445	–	.468	8.8	1.2	–	–	7.8
1969–70	San Diego	77	–	21.1	.429	–	.578	8.1	1.2	–	–	7.1
1970–71	San Diego	80	–	13.8	.387	–	.472	5.1	0.8	–	–	3.4
1971–72	Milwaukee	74	–	13.1	.467	–	.543	4.2	0.8	–	–	3.5
1972–73	Kansas City–Omaha	67	–	9.6	.436	–	.657	2.9	0.4	–	–	3.5
1973–74	Philadelphia	75	–	21.2	**.474**	–	.686	7.4	1.0	**0.7**	**0.3**	7.5
1974–75	New Orleans	3	–	30.0	.304	–	**.857**	8.7	1.3	**0.7**	0.0	6.7
Career		571	–	18.3	.425	–	.573	6.8	1.0	0.7	0.3	6.1

=== Playoffs ===
Year	Team	GP	GS	MPG	FG%	3P%	FT%	RPG	APG	SPG	BPG	PPG
1967	Boston	1	–	4.0	.000	–	.000	3.0	0.0	–	–	0.0
1969	San Diego	6	–	**32.8**	**.434**	–	.520	**12.3**	**0.7**	–	–	**9.8**
1972	Milwaukee	**7**	–	5.1	.417	–	**1.000**	0.9	0.3	–	–	1.7
Career		14	–	16.9	.418	–	.556	5.9	0.4	–	–	5.1

== See also ==
- List of NCAA Division I men's basketball season rebounding leaders
