= Loy Petersen =

American basketball player (born 1945)

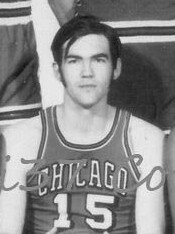
- Petersen with the Chicago Bulls in 1969

Personal information
- Born: July 26, 1945 (age 81) Anaheim, California, U.S.
- Listed height: 6 ft 5 in (1.96 m)
- Listed weight: 205 lb (93 kg)

Career information
- High school: Anaheim (Anaheim, California)
- College: Oregon State (1965–1968)
- NBA draft: 1968: 2nd round, 17th overall pick
- Drafted by: Chicago Bulls
- Playing career: 1968–1970
- Position: Shooting guard
- Number: 15

Career history
- 1968–1970: Chicago Bulls

Career highlights
- Second-team All-AAWU (1966)
- Stats at NBA.com
- Stats at Basketball Reference

Loy M. Petersen (born July 26, 1945) is an American former professional basketball player who played in the National Basketball Association (NBA) from 1968 to 1970. A shooting guard, he played college basketball for the Oregon State Beavers, and was drafted in the second round (17th overall) of the 1968 NBA draft by the Chicago Bulls; previously, he was also drafted in the 17th round of the 1967 NBA draft by the Baltimore Bullets (now the Washington Wizards). He played in 69 career games over two seasons for the Bulls.

Loy now lives in Madras, Oregon, with his wife, Carol.

== Career statistics ==
Legend
GP	Games played	GS	Games started	MPG	Minutes per game
FG%	Field goal percentage	3P%	3-point field goal percentage	FT%	Free throw percentage
RPG	Rebounds per game	APG	Assists per game	SPG	Steals per game
BPG	Blocks per game	PPG	Points per game	**Bold**	Career high

=== NBA ===
==== Regular season ====
Year	Team	GP	MPG	FG%	FT%	RPG	APG	PPG
1968–69	Chicago	**38**	**7.9**	**.404**	**.704**	**1.1**	**.7**	2.8
1969–70	Chicago	31	7.5	.367	.667	.8	**.7**	**3.0**
Career		69	7.7	.387	.682	1.0	.7	2.9
