= Skip Harlicka =

American basketball player

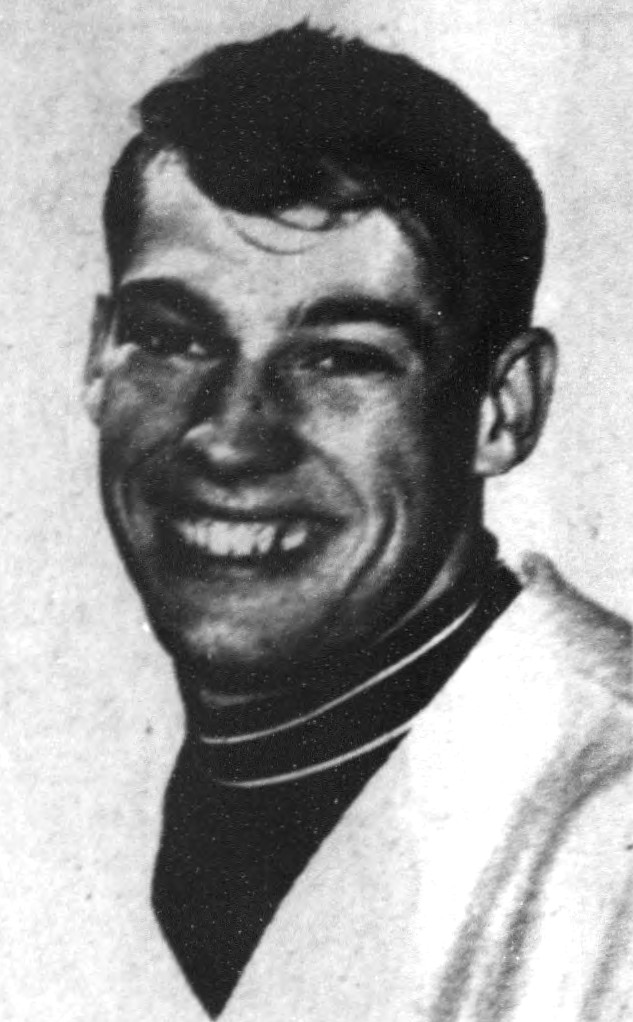
- Harlicka, circa 1967

Personal information
- Born: October 14, 1946 (age 80) Trenton, New Jersey, U.S.
- Listed height: 6 ft 1 in (1.85 m)
- Listed weight: 185 lb (84 kg)

Career information
- High school: Notre Dame (Lawrenceville, New Jersey)
- College: South Carolina (1965–1968)
- NBA draft: 1968: 1st round, 13th overall pick
- Drafted by: Atlanta Hawks
- Playing career: 1968–1969
- Position: Point guard
- Number: 21

Career history
- 1968–1969: Atlanta Hawks

Career highlights
- First-team All-ACC (1968)
- Stats at NBA.com
- Stats at Basketball Reference

Jules Peter "Skip" Harlicka (born October 14, 1946) is an American former basketball player for the Atlanta Hawks of the National Basketball Association (NBA).

Harlicka attended the University of South Carolina on a basketball scholarship, but also played baseball his freshman year. During his college basketball career, he averaged 17.5 points per game on 47.5% shooting from the field. Harlicka was drafted with the 13th pick in the 1968 NBA draft by the Atlanta Hawks. He played one season for the Hawks, appearing in 26 games while averaging 4.1 points per game and 1.4 assists per game.

== Career statistics ==
Legend
GP	Games played	GS	Games started	MPG	Minutes per game
FG%	Field goal percentage	3P%	3-point field goal percentage	FT%	Free throw percentage
RPG	Rebounds per game	APG	Assists per game	SPG	Steals per game
BPG	Blocks per game	PPG	Points per game	**Bold**	Career high

=== NBA ===
==== Regular season ====
Year	Team	GP	MPG	FG%	FT%	RPG	APG	PPG
1968–69	Atlanta	26	8.4	.456	.774	.6	1.4	4.1

==== Playoffs ====
Year	Team	GP	MPG	FG%	FT%	RPG	APG	PPG
1969	Atlanta	1	1.0	–	–	.0	.0	.0
