= 1968–69 San Diego Rockets season =

- Head coach: Jack McMahon
- General manager: Pete Newell
- Owner: Bob Breitbard
- Arena: San Diego Sports Arena

Results
- Record: 37–45 (.451)
- Place: Division: 4th (Western)
- Playoff finish: Division semifinals (lost to Hawks 2–4)
- Stats at Basketball Reference

Local media
- Television: KFMB-TV
- Radio: KFMB

The 1968–69 San Diego Rockets season was the Rockets' 2nd season in the NBA.

In the playoffs, the Rockets lost to the Atlanta Hawks in six games in the Semifinals.

== Roster ==
1968–69 San Diego Rockets roster
Players

Pos.	No.	Player	Height	Weight	DOB	From
PG	12	Rick Adelman	6 ft 1 in (1.85 m)	175 lb (79 kg)	1946-06-16	Loyola Marymount
SF	30	Harry Barnes	6 ft 3 in (1.91 m)	205 lb (93 kg)	1945-07-25	Northeastern
SG	33	Jim Barnett	6 ft 4 in (1.93 m)	170 lb (77 kg)	1944-07-07	Oregon
PF	34	John Block	6 ft 9 in (2.06 m)	207 lb (94 kg)	1944-04-16	USC
C	17	Henry Finkel	7 ft 0 in (2.13 m)	240 lb (109 kg)	1942-04-20	Dayton
C	11	Elvin Hayes	6 ft 9 in (2.06 m)	235 lb (107 kg)	1945-11-17	Houston
PF	7	Toby Kimball	6 ft 6 in (1.98 m)	220 lb (100 kg)	1942-09-07	Connecticut
SF	44	Don Kojis	6 ft 5 in (1.96 m)	215 lb (98 kg)	1939-01-15	Marquette
SG	22	Stu Lantz	6 ft 3 in (1.91 m)	175 lb (79 kg)	1946-07-13	Nebraska
SG	42	Pat Riley	6 ft 4 in (1.93 m)	205 lb (93 kg)	1945-03-20	Kentucky
SF	31	John Q. Trapp	6 ft 7 in (2.01 m)	210 lb (95 kg)	1945-10-02	UNLV
PG	14	Art Williams	6 ft 1 in (1.85 m)	180 lb (82 kg)	1939-09-29	Cal Poly Pomona

Coaches
Head coach
- Jack McMahon

Legend
- (DP) Unsigned draft pick
- (FA) Free agent
- (S) Suspended
- Injured

Roster

== Regular season ==
=== Season standings ===
Western Division	W	L	PCT	GB	Home	Road	Neutral	Div
x-Los Angeles Lakers	55	27	.671	–	32–9	21–18	2–0	30–10
x-Atlanta Hawks	48	34	.585	7	28–12	18–21	2–1	26–14
x-San Francisco Warriors	41	41	.500	14	22–19	18–21	1–1	20–20
x-San Diego Rockets	37	45	.451	18	25–16	8–25	4–4	20–20
Chicago Bulls	33	49	.402	22	19–21	12–25	2–3	19–21
Seattle SuperSonics	30	52	.366	25	18–18	6–29	6–5	15–23
Phoenix Suns	16	66	.195	39	11–26	4–28	1–12	8–30

x – clinched playoff spot

=== Game log ===
1968–69 game log
#	Date	Opponent	Score	High points	Record
1	October 17	Seattle	110–128	Don Kojis (34)	1–0
2	October 18	@ San Francisco	123–108	Elvin Hayes (32)	2–0
3	October 23	@ Seattle	117–118	Elvin Hayes (24)	2–1
4	October 24	Baltimore	119–115	Elvin Hayes (25)	2–2
5	October 27	@ Los Angeles	116–152	Don Kojis (29)	2–3
6	October 30	Atlanta	116–127	Elvin Hayes (32)	3–3
7	November 3	Chicago	107–121	Elvin Hayes (30)	4–3
8	November 5	New York	109–113	Don Kojis (28)	5–3
9	November 8	@ Atlanta	101–114	Elvin Hayes (26)	5–4
10	November 9	@ Baltimore	107–109	Elvin Hayes (30)	5–5
11	November 11	@ Boston	113–134	Don Kojis (29)	5–6
12	November 12	@ Chicago	108–115	Elvin Hayes (40)	5–7
13	November 13	Detroit	120–122	Elvin Hayes (54)	6–7
14	November 15	@ Los Angeles	119–127	Elvin Hayes (38)	6–8
15	November 16	Boston	120–112	Don Kojis (32)	6–9
16	November 19	@ New York	113–107	Elvin Hayes (39)	7–9
17	November 20	@ Baltimore	110–114	Jim Barnett (36)	7–10
18	November 22	Seattle	111–126	Elvin Hayes (45)	8–10
19	November 24	Philadelphia	128–135 (OT)	Elvin Hayes (37)	9–10
20	November 26	N Detroit	120–134	Elvin Hayes (34)	9–11
21	November 27	N Baltimore	123–107	Elvin Hayes (36)	10–11
22	November 29	Chicago	110–89	Elvin Hayes (28)	10–12
23	December 1	San Francisco	105–116	Don Kojis (30)	11–12
24	December 3	@ Chicago	108–103	Jim Barnett (29)	12–12
25	December 4	@ Philadelphia	99–110	Don Kojis (33)	12–13
26	December 6	Phoenix	106–117	Jim Barnett (27)	13–13
27	December 8	@ Los Angeles	118–132	Barnett, Hayes (29)	13–14
28	December 10	N Philadelphia	132–120	Elvin Hayes (39)	14–14
29	December 11	@ Cincinnati	110–116	Elvin Hayes (35)	14–15
30	December 13	@ Milwaukee	96–101	Elvin Hayes (27)	14–16
31	December 14	@ New York	105–112	Elvin Hayes (26)	14–17
32	December 18	@ Detroit	112–124	Elvin Hayes (40)	14–18
33	December 20	Philadelphia	116–109	Elvin Hayes (31)	14–19
34	December 21	Cincinnati	124–132	Block, Kojis (30)	15–19
35	December 23	San Francisco	125–95	Don Kojis (18)	15–20
36	December 27	New York	111–109	Elvin Hayes (40)	15–21
37	December 28	@ Phoenix	136–126	Elvin Hayes (40)	16–21
38	December 30	Los Angeles	131–126 (OT)	Elvin Hayes (33)	16–22
39	January 2	Boston	107–95	Elvin Hayes (32)	16–23
40	January 4	Seattle	105–122	Elvin Hayes (29)	17–23
41	January 7	@ San Francisco	113–108	Jim Barnett (31)	18–23
42	January 8	Baltimore	108–107	Elvin Hayes (26)	18–24
43	January 10	Baltimore	106–104	Elvin Hayes (32)	18–25
44	January 12	New York	105–102	John Block (29)	18–26
45	January 16	N Cincinnati	109–120	Elvin Hayes (38)	18–27
46	January 17	@ Philadelphia	124–129	John Block (31)	18–28
47	January 18	@ Chicago	102–107 (OT)	Elvin Hayes (25)	18–29
48	January 19	@ Phoenix	136–118	Don Kojis (26)	19–29
49	January 21	Atlanta	113–124	Elvin Hayes (27)	20–29
50	January 24	@ San Francisco	107–114	Elvin Hayes (30)	20–30
51	January 25	Phoenix	120–133	Elvin Hayes (32)	21–30
52	January 26	Chicago	95–111	Hayes, Kojis (29)	22–30
53	January 29	Los Angeles	122–120	Elvin Hayes (40)	22–31
54	February 1	Milwaukee	95–101	Don Kojis (26)	23–31
55	February 2	@ Atlanta	103–115	Elvin Hayes (32)	23–32
56	February 4	N Boston	135–126	Elvin Hayes (32)	24–32
57	February 5	Cincinnati	93–110	Barnett, Hayes, Kojis (25)	25–32
58	February 7	Phoenix	119–130	Elvin Hayes (31)	26–32
59	February 8	@ Detroit	119–123 (OT)	Elvin Hayes (28)	26–33
60	February 9	@ Milwaukee	109–117	Elvin Hayes (32)	26–34
61	February 12	@ Cincinnati	118–114	John Block (29)	27–34
62	February 14	@ Los Angeles	109–115	Elvin Hayes (25)	27–35
63	February 18	Philadelphia	125–113	Elvin Hayes (37)	27–36
64	February 20	San Francisco	128–118	Don Kojis (36)	27–37
65	February 22	@ New York	108–104	Elvin Hayes (33)	28–37
66	February 23	@ Atlanta	92–124	Pat Riley (20)	28–38
67	February 25	@ Milwaukee	112–114	John Block (25)	28–39
68	February 27	Cincinnati	112–127	Don Kojis (32)	29–39
69	March 1	Los Angeles	119–113	Don Kojis (38)	29–40
70	March 4	@ Seattle	116–130	Don Kojis (30)	29–41
71	March 6	Boston	97–110	Elvin Hayes (31)	30–41
72	March 9	@ Phoenix	133–146	Elvin Hayes (39)	30–42
73	March 11	Phoenix	106–116	Elvin Hayes (33)	31–42
74	March 12	N Seattle	125–112	Elvin Hayes (22)	31–43
75	March 13	Detroit	105–120	Don Kojis (33)	32–43
76	March 15	N Phoenix	141–124	Elvin Hayes (39)	33–43
77	March 16	Detroit	111–120	Don Kojis (34)	34–43
78	March 18	Milwaukee	108–128	Don Kojis (34)	35–43
79	March 20	Atlanta	97–115	Elvin Hayes (24)	36–43
80	March 22	Milwaukee	120–106	Elvin Hayes (22)	36–44
81	March 23	Atlanta	121–128	Hayes, Riley (25)	37–44
82	March 24	N Boston	107–111	John Block (19)	37–45

== Playoffs ==
1969 playoff game log
Division semifinals: 2–4 (home: 2–1; road: 0–3)

Game	Date	Team	Score	High points	High rebounds	High assists	Location Attendance	Series
1	March 27	@ Atlanta	L 98–107	Elvin Hayes (31)	Toby Kimball (15)	Art Williams (6)	Alexander Memorial Coliseum; 4,194	0–1
2	March 29	@ Atlanta	L 114–116	Rick Adelman (26)	three players tied (9)	Rick Adelman (6)	Alexander Memorial Coliseum; 6,006	0–2
3	April 1	Atlanta	W 104–97	Elvin Hayes (26)	Elvin Hayes (19)	Rick Adelman (8)	San Diego Sports Arena; 9,340	1–2
4	April 4	Atlanta	W 114–112	Elvin Hayes (30)	Elvin Hayes (20)	Don Kojis (4)	San Diego Sports Arena; 12,337	2–2
5	April 6	@ Atlanta	L 101–112	Elvin Hayes (27)	Elvin Hayes (9)	Art Williams (8)	Alexander Memorial Coliseum; 4,007	2–3
6	April 7	Atlanta	L 106–108	Kojis, Hayes (26)	Toby Kimball (15)	Adelman, Williams (6)	San Diego Sports Arena; 10,117	2–4

1969 schedule

== Awards and records ==
- Elvin Hayes, NBA Scoring Champion
- Elvin Hayes, NBA All-Rookie Team 1st Team
