= 1968–69 Atlanta Hawks season =

NBA professional basketball team season

- Head coach: Richie Guerin
- Arena: Alexander Memorial Coliseum

Results
- Record: 48–34 (.585)
- Place: Division: 2nd (Western)
- Playoff finish: West Division Finals (Eliminated 1–4)
- Stats at Basketball Reference

Local media
- Television: WQXI-TV
- Radio: WQXI

The 1968–69 Atlanta Hawks season was the team's first season in Atlanta, 20th in the NBA, and 23rd overall. The Hawks relocated from St. Louis, where the franchise played the previous thirteen seasons. Lenny Wilkens was traded to the Seattle SuperSonics in exchange for Walt Hazzard, who would help lead the Hawks to a second-place finish with a record of 48 wins and 34 losses. In the playoffs, the Hawks eliminated the San Diego Rockets in six games. In the Western Conference Finals, the Hawks challenged the Los Angeles Lakers; the Lakers would eliminate the Hawks in 5 games.

== Draft picks ==
Round	Pick	Player	Position	Nationality	College
1	13	Skip Harlicka	Guard	United States	South Carolina
10	131	Dwight Waller	Forward	United States	Tennessee State

The team appeared in the draft for the first time as the Atlanta Hawks.

== Roster ==
1968–69 Atlanta Hawks roster
Players

Pos.	No.	Player	Height	Weight	DOB	From
C	31	Zelmo Beaty	6 ft 9 in (2.06 m)	225 lb (102 kg)		Prairie View A&M
F/C	32	Bill Bridges	6 ft 6 in (1.98 m)	228 lb (103 kg)		Kansas
G/F	27	Joe Caldwell	6 ft 5 in (1.96 m)	195 lb (88 kg)		Arizona State
F/C	24	Jim Davis	6 ft 9 in (2.06 m)	225 lb (102 kg)		Colorado
G	18–19	Richie Guerin	6 ft 4 in (1.93 m)	195 lb (88 kg)		Iona
F	12	Dennis Hamilton	6 ft 8 in (2.03 m)	210 lb (95 kg)		Arizona State
G	21	Skip Harlicka (DP)	6 ft 1 in (1.85 m)	185 lb (84 kg)		South Carolina
G	42	Walt Hazzard	6 ft 2 in (1.88 m)	185 lb (84 kg)		UCLA
G/F	23	Lou Hudson	6 ft 5 in (1.96 m)	210 lb (95 kg)		Minnesota
G	20	George Lehmann	6 ft 0 in (1.83 m)	180 lb (82 kg)		Campbell (KS)
G	10	Don Ohl	6 ft 3 in (1.91 m)	190 lb (86 kg)		Illinois
F/C	29	Paul Silas	6 ft 7 in (2.01 m)	220 lb (100 kg)		Creighton
F	16–34	Dwight Waller (DP)	6 ft 6 in (1.98 m)	220 lb (100 kg)		Tennessee State

Coaches
Head coach
- Richie Guerin (Iona)

Legend
- (DP) Unsigned draft pick
- (FA) Free agent
- (S) Suspended
- Injured

== Regular season ==
=== Season standings ===
Western Division	W	L	PCT	GB	Home	Road	Neutral	Div
x-Los Angeles Lakers	55	27	.671	–	32–9	21–18	2–0	30–10
x-Atlanta Hawks	48	34	.585	7	28–12	18–21	2–1	26–14
x-San Francisco Warriors	41	41	.500	14	22–19	18–21	1–1	20–20
x-San Diego Rockets	37	45	.451	18	25–16	8–25	4–4	20–20
Chicago Bulls	33	49	.402	22	19–21	12–25	2–3	19–21
Seattle SuperSonics	30	52	.366	25	18–18	6–29	6–5	15–23
Phoenix Suns	16	66	.195	39	11–26	4–28	1–12	8–30

=== Game log ===
1968–69 game log
Total: 48–34
October (Total: 3–4)

Game	Date	Team	Score	Location Attendance	Record
1	October 16	Cincinnati	110–125	Alexander Memorial Coliseum	0–1
2	October 19	Milwaukee	125–107	Alexander Memorial Coliseum	1–1
3	October 23	Chicago	106–91	Alexander Memorial Coliseum	2–1
4	October 25	Seattle	112–123	Seattle Center Coliseum	2–2
5	October 27	Phoenix	123–100	Arizona Veterans Memorial Coliseum	3–2
6	October 29	L.A. Lakers	124–125	The Forum	3–3
7	October 30	San Diego	116–127	San Diego Sports Arena	3–4

November (Total: 9–8)

Game	Date	Team	Score	Location Attendance	Record
8	November 1	San Francisco	109–105	Alexander Memorial Coliseum	4–4
9	November 3	Boston	103–123	Alexander Memorial Coliseum	4–5
10	November 6	Baltimore	119–140	Baltimore Civic Center	4–6
11	November 8	San Diego	114–101	Alexander Memorial Coliseum	5–6
12	November 9	San Francisco	113–106	Alexander Memorial Coliseum	6–6
13	November 12	San Francisco	108–123	Oakland–Alameda County Coliseum Arena	6–7
14	November 13	Seattle	142–113	Seattle Center Coliseum	7–7
15	November 15	Philadelphia	115–116	Alexander Memorial Coliseum	7–8
16	November 16	Cincinnati	125–130	Cincinnati Gardens	7–9
17	November 19	Milwaukee	89–119	Milwaukee Arena	7–10
18	November 20	New York	111–106	Alexander Memorial Coliseum	8–10
19	November 21	Detroit	129–121	Cobo Arena	9–10
20	November 23	Chicago	114–96	Chicago Stadium	10–10
21	November 24	Baltimore	111–118	Alexander Memorial Coliseum	10–11
22	November 26	Baltimore	99–102	Baltimore Civic Center	10–12
23	November 27	Cincinnati	94–91	Alexander Memorial Coliseum	11–12
24	November 30	Cincinnati	126–109	Cincinnati Gardens	12–12

December (Total: 10–3)

Game	Date	Team	Score	Location Attendance	Record
25	December 3	New York	93–126	Madison Square Garden	12–13
26	December 4	New York	113–121	Alexander Memorial Coliseum	12–14
27	December 6	L.A. Lakers	94–99	Alexander Memorial Coliseum	12–15
28	December 8	Phoenix	121–99	Arizona Veterans Memorial Coliseum	13–15
29	December 10	San Francisco	111–100	Oakland–Alameda County Coliseum Arena	14–15
30	December 12	Seattle	93–91	Seattle Center Coliseum	15–15
31	December 13	L.A. Lakers	105–103	The Forum	16–15
32	December 17	Chicago	87–83	Chicago Stadium	17–15
33	December 18	Milwaukee	122–116	Alexander Memorial Coliseum	18–15
34	December 21	Detroit	120–110	Alexander Memorial Coliseum	19–15
35	December 26	Seattle	126–96	Alexander Memorial Coliseum	20–15
36	December 28	Boston	110–97	Alexander Memorial Coliseum	21–15
37	December 29	Baltimore	101–99	Alexander Memorial Coliseum	22–15

January (Total: 11–7)

Game	Date	Team	Score	Location Attendance	Record
38	January 2	Chicago	106–88	Chicago Stadium	23–15
39	January 3	Detroit	128–106	Cobo Arena	24–15
40	January 4	L.A. Lakers	111–121	Alexander Memorial Coliseum	24–16
41	January 5	Phoenix	97–96	Alexander Memorial Coliseum	25–16
42	January 8	Philadelphia	111–112	Spectrum	25–17
43	January 10	Detroit	104–101	Alexander Memorial Coliseum	26–17
44	January 11	L.A. Lakers	104–100	Alexander Memorial Coliseum	27–17
45	January 16	Phoenix	112–107	Columbia, South Carolina	28–17
46	January 17	Phoenix	112–107	Alexander Memorial Coliseum	29–17
47	January 19	New York	100–96	Alexander Memorial Coliseum	30–17
48	January 21	San Diego	113–124	San Diego Sports Arena	30–18
49	January 22	Phoenix	125–107	Arizona Veterans Memorial Coliseum	31–18
50	January 24	L.A. Lakers	110–106	Alexander Memorial Coliseum	32–18
51	January 25	Baltimore	112–109	Baltimore Civic Center	33–18
52	January 26	Philadelphia	115–119	Alexander Memorial Coliseum	33–19
53	January 28	Boston	96–108	Boston Garden	33–20
54	January 29	Philadelphia	96–119	Spectrum	33–21
55	January 31	Seattle	112–119	Alexander Memorial Coliseum	33–22

February (Total: 9–7)

Game	Date	Team	Score	Location Attendance	Record
56	February 1	Detroit	119–99	Alexander Memorial Coliseum	34–22
57	February 2	San Diego	115–103	Alexander Memorial Coliseum	35–22
58	February 4	New York	97–122	Madison Square Garden	35–23
59	February 7	Boston	109–107	Boston Garden	36–23
60	February 8	Chicago	106–97	Alexander Memorial Coliseum	37–23
61	February 9	Baltimore	101–102	Alexander Memorial Coliseum	37–24
62	February 11	San Francisco	87–92	Alexander Memorial Coliseum	37–25
63	February 12	Milwaukee	113–106	Milwaukee Arena	38–25
64	February 14	Boston	104–101	Alexander Memorial Coliseum	39–25
65	February 16	San Francisco	106–113	Alexander Memorial Coliseum	39–26
66	February 17	Milwaukee	111–123	Baltimore, MD	39–27
67	February 18	Cincinnati	124–123	Cleveland	40–27
68	February 20	Detroit	97–87	Cobo Arena	41–27
69	February 23	San Diego	124–92	Alexander Memorial Coliseum	42–27
70	February 25	New York	101–122	Madison Square Garden	42–28
71	February 28	Boston	120–122	Boston Garden	42–29

March (Total: 6–5)

Game	Date	Team	Score	Location Attendance	Record
72	March 2	Milwaukee	112–108	Alexander Memorial Coliseum	43–29
73	March 6	Philadelphia	139–99	Alexander Memorial Coliseum	44–29
74	March 9	Cincinnati	134–107	Alexander Memorial Coliseum	45–29
75	March 11	Chicago	90–102	Chicago Stadium	45–30
76	March 12	Chicago	109–90	Alexander Memorial Coliseum	46–30
77	March 15	Philadelphia	120–122	Spectrum	46–31
78	March 16	Seattle	131–127 (OT)	Alexander Memorial Coliseum	47–31
79	March 18	San Francisco	128–115	Oakland–Alameda County Coliseum Arena	48–31
80	March 20	San Diego	97–115	San Diego Sports Arena	48–32
81	March 21	L.A. Lakers	103–116	The Forum	48–33
82	March 23	San Diego	121–128	San Diego Sports Arena	48–34

1968–69 schedule

== Playoffs ==
1969 playoff game log
Division Semifinals: 4–2 (home: 3–0; road: 1–2)

Game	Date	Team	Score	High points	High rebounds	High assists	Location Attendance	Series
1	March 27	San Diego	W 107–98	Lou Hudson (39)	Bill Bridges (22)	Ohl, Hazzard (3)	Alexander Memorial Coliseum; 4,194	1–0
2	March 29	San Diego	W 116–114	Zelmo Beaty (31)	Bill Bridges (14)	Joe Caldwell (8)	Alexander Memorial Coliseum; 6,006	2–0
3	April 1	@ San Diego	L 97–104	Zelmo Beaty (31)	Zelmo Beaty (17)	Joe Caldwell (6)	San Diego Sports Arena; 9,340	2–1
4	April 4	@ San Diego	L 112–114	Walt Hazzard (34)	Beaty, Bridges (11)	Walt Hazzard (5)	San Diego Sports Arena; 12,337	2–2
5	April 6	San Diego	W 112–101	Joe Caldwell (26)	Bill Bridges (17)	Caldwell, Hazzard (5)	Alexander Memorial Coliseum; 4,007	3–2
6	April 7	@ San Diego	W 108–106	Lou Hudson (27)	Bill Bridges (17)	Caldwell, Hazzard (4)	San Diego Sports Arena; 10,117	4–2

Division Finals: 1–4 (home: 1–1; road: 0–3)

Game	Date	Team	Score	High points	High rebounds	High assists	Location Attendance	Series
1	April 11	Los Angeles	L 93–95	Zelmo Beaty (29)	Bill Bridges (20)	Walt Hazzard (6)	The Forum; 16,190	0–1
2	April 13	@ Los Angeles	L 102–104	Joe Caldwell (34)	Caldwell, Bridges (10)	Bill Bridges (5)	The Forum; 15,136	0–2
3	April 15	Los Angeles	W 99–86	Zelmo Beaty (22)	Zelmo Beaty (15)	Lou Hudson (5)	Alexander Memorial Coliseum; 7,140	1–2
4	April 17	Los Angeles	L 85–100	Lou Hudson (35)	Zelmo Beaty (20)	Bill Bridges (5)	Alexander Memorial Coliseum; 7,140	1–3
5	April 20	@ Los Angeles	L 96–104	Zelmo Beaty (30)	Bill Bridges (22)	Lou Hudson (7)	The Forum; 16,273	1–4

1969 schedule

== Player statistics ==
Legend
GP	Games played	GS	Games started	MPG	Minutes per game
FG%	Field-goal percentage	3P%	3-point field-goal percentage	FT%	Free-throw percentage
RPG	Rebounds per game	APG	Assists per game	SPG	Steals per game
BPG	Blocks per game	PPG	Points per game

=== Season ===
Player	GP	GS	MPG	FG%	3FG%	FT%	RPG	APG	SPG	BPG	PPG
Walt Hazzard	80		30.3	.397		.707	3.3	5.9			11.2
Zelmo Beaty	72		35.8	.470		.731	11.1	1.8			21.5
Bill Bridges	80		36.6	.453		.677	14.2	3.7			11.8
Joe Caldwell	81		33.6	.507		.537	3.7	4.0			15.8
Jim Davis	78		17.5	.467		.667	6.8	1.2			8.8
Richie Guerin	27		17.5	.423		.770	2.2	3.7			5.6
Dennis Hamilton	25		5.6	.552		.400	1.2	0.3			3.0
Skip Harlicka	26		8.4	.456		.774	0.6	1.4			4.1
Lou Hudson	81		35.4	.492		.777	6.6	2.7			21.9
George Lehmann	11		12.5	.388		.667	0.8	2.5			5.5
Don Ohl	76		26.3	.427		.707	2.2	2.9			12.1
Paul Silas	79		23.5	.419		.613	9.4	1.8			8.7
Dwight Waller	11		2.6	.222		.429	0.9	0.1			0.6

=== Playoffs ===
Player	GP	GS	MPG	FG%	3FG%	FT%	RPG	APG	SPG	BPG	PPG
Walt Hazzard	11		32.7	.393		.787	3.0	3.9			14.0
Zelmo Beaty	11		43.0	.432		.672	12.9	2.3			22.5
Bill Bridges	11		40.2	.442		.708	16.2	3.4			15.6
Joe Caldwell	11		36.7	.485		.464	5.0	3.4			14.7
Jim Davis	8		6.5	.267		.625	2.1	0.1			1.6
Richie Guerin	3		10.7	.250		.500	1.7	2.3			1.0
Skip Harlicka	1		1.0	.000		.000	0.0	0.0			0.0
Lou Hudson	11		38.5	.468		.769	5.4	2.9			22.0
Don Ohl	11		17.6	.349		.591	1.2	1.5			6.6
Paul Silas	11		23.5	.362		.514	8.4	1.9			5.5

== Awards ==
- Bill Bridges, NBA All-Defensive Second Team

== Transactions ==
Atlanta Hawks

Players Added

Via Draft

- Skip Harlicka
- Dwight Waller

Via Trade

- Walt Hazzard (From SuperSonics)
Players Lost

Via Trade

- Lenny Wilkens (To SuperSonics)
