= 1968–69 NBA season =

23rd NBA season

- League: National Basketball Association
- Sport: Basketball
- Duration: October 15, 1968 – March 24, 1969; March 26 – April 20, 1969 (Playoffs); April 23 – May 5, 1969 (Finals)
- Games: 82
- Teams: 14
- TV partner: ABC

Draft
- Top draft pick: Elvin Hayes
- Picked by: San Diego Rockets

Regular season
- Top seed: Baltimore Bullets
- Season MVP: Wes Unseld (Baltimore)
- Top scorer: Elvin Hayes (San Diego)

Playoffs
- Eastern champions: Boston Celtics
- Eastern runners-up: New York Knicks
- Western champions: Los Angeles Lakers
- Western runners-up: Atlanta Hawks

Finals
- Champions: Boston Celtics
- Runners-up: Los Angeles Lakers
- Finals MVP: Jerry West (L.A. Lakers)

NBA seasons
- ← 1967–68 1969–70 →

The 1968–69 NBA season was the 23rd season of the National Basketball Association. The season ended with the Boston Celtics winning the NBA championship, beating the Los Angeles Lakers 4 games to 3 in the NBA Finals.

== Notable occurrences ==
- The Phoenix Suns and the Milwaukee Bucks began play as the league expanded to 14 teams.
- The Hawks relocated from St. Louis to Atlanta.
- The 1969 NBA All-Star Game was played at the Baltimore Civic Center in Baltimore, Maryland, with the East beating the West 123–112. Oscar Robertson of the Cincinnati Royals won the game's MVP award.
- The inaugural NBA Finals MVP Award was won by Jerry West of the Los Angeles Lakers, despite his team losing in seven games to the Boston Celtics.
- The NBA All-Defensive Team was named for the first time and became part of the NBA's regular season awards.
- Wilt Chamberlain won his eighth of eleven eventual rebounding titles with 21.14 per game. This remains an unbroken NBA record; Dennis Rodman currently ranks second with seven career rebounding titles. It was also, incidentally, the last season to date in which any NBA player averaged more than twenty rebounds per game.

Coaching changes
Offseason
Team	1967–68 coach	1968–69 coach
Chicago Bulls	Johnny "Red" Kerr	Dick Motta
Milwaukee Bucks	Expansion	Larry Costello
Philadelphia 76ers	Alex Hannum	Jack Ramsay
Phoenix Suns	Expansion	Johnny "Red" Kerr
San Francisco Warriors	Bill Sharman	George C. Lee
In-season
Team	Outgoing coach	Incoming coach
Detroit Pistons	Donnie Butcher	Paul Seymour

== Season recap ==
The Philadelphia 76ers, champions two seasons ago and the favorites last year, lost two key leaders before the season. Coach Alex Hannum jumped to the ABA for more money. Wilt Chamberlain, who absorbed criticism after their loss to Boston last year just days after the King murder, demanded a trade out of his hometown. So he made major waves in the league by signing with the Los Angeles Lakers. It put Chamberlain's team in the favorite role for the third straight year.

Four NBA teams won 50 or more games this year. While Russell and Chamberlain remained the subject of much discussion, the team of the year was the Baltimore Bullets. Just 36–46 a year ago, the Bullets rallied around 6' 7 250-pound rookie Wes Unseld and won a league-high 57 of 82 NBA games. Unseld was fifth in the league in rebounds and showed remarkable strength under the boards. A boycotter of the Mexico City Olympics, Unseld found new life and fans in Baltimore. Guard Earl Monroe, himself a major fan draw with his collection of offensive moves, followed up on his Rookie of the Year trophy from a year ago to finish second in the NBA in scoring. Teammate Kevin Loughery added 22.6 games as well. Coach Gene Shue's eight-man rotation sank more field goals than any other team. But Gus Johnson's knee injury was an issue for the coming playoffs.

Right behind the Bullets in the NBA's East Division were the resurgent 76ers. Jack Ramsay, a legendary local product, was now the coach. With Wilt gone, Ramsay turned to Billy Cunningham as a team leader. Cunningham was third in the NBA in scoring and tenth in rebounds. An aggressive defender, Cunningham also led the NBA in personal fouls. Guard Hal Greer also picked up some of the slack. The 32-year-old speedster added 23.1 points per game and five assists to help the NBA's highest scoring offense. The team had gained some bench depth with the Wilt trade from the Lakers, but also lost big man Luke Jackson to injury after 25 games. Like the Bullets, they would be hampered at playoff time.

The Los Angeles Lakers also won 55 games and the NBA's West Division. Coach Butch Van Breda Kolff, who led the runners-up a year ago, was admittedly not a Wilt fan. But even he could not fault a player who scored 20.6 points per game while passing up numerous shots, led the NBA in rebounds at over 20 a game, led the league in shooting accuracy at 58.3% and added 4.5 assists per game. The ball was not in Wilt's hands as much, but the giant was still the best center in basketball. Wilt again used a league-high 857 free throw tries to help offset his foul line percentage. Jerry West, whose silhouette was now the league logo, battled injuries again while averaging 26 points and seven assists per game. Elgin Baylor would pick up some of the slack at LA's third 20-point scorer while adding ten rebounds per game and 5.4 assists at age 34. The legend knew he now had a chance at the elusive title he and West had chased all decade. Despite the trade to Philadelphia that had sent away some key reserves, the Lakers had enough on the bench to surely contend in the playoffs.

The New York Knicks won 54 games to be 3rd place in the East. A trade had boosted this club as well. Dave DeBusschere, the defender and rebounder in Detroit who had been the coach there for his hometown team, was brought over by coach Red Holzman in trade for center Walt Bellamy and point guard Howie Komives.

Just off the radar were two 48-game winners, the Boston Celtics and the new Atlanta Hawks. 34-year-old player/coach Bill Russell was fighting through a knee injury, and the club he led to a title a year ago did not appear to be a convincing champion. Six Celtics did average over ten points a game, but Russell was not one of them. He was again third in rebounds and was still an effective shot blocker. John Havlicek and Bailey Howell both took on bigger roles for the club, which was still strong defensively and unselfish with the ball.

The Atlanta Hawks were still the former St. Louis Hawks. Rich Guerin was still the coach and the roster was still largely the same, led by scorers Zelmo Beaty and Lou Hudson. Six scorers over ten points per game and a strong bench showed that Hawks were looking to improve on their fold in the playoffs a year ago.

Eight of the NBA's then-fourteen teams finished .500 or better that year, a fact helped very much by the expansion teams in recent years that made up the bulk of the West Division.

Four teams in each division made the playoffs. Once again, the NBA had the division winners play the third place teams, while the second place clubs got the easier fourth place teams as first round opponents. The Cincinnati Royals, victims of the strong East Division all decade long, won half their games this year, again behind the stellar play of Oscar Robertson and Jerry Lucas. But the 37–45 San Diego Rockets, led by super-rookie Elvin Hayes and Don Kojis, were going to the playoffs while the Royals stayed home. With the rise of other clubs in the East, and ownership's inability to build around their two stars, it was now apparent that the Royals would have to go a whole new direction to build a winner.

Baltimore were swept in four games. Unseld and his guards played well, but the loss of Johnson and a poor bench were no match for the balanced, well-organized New Yorkers.

Injury also affected the Philadelphia – Boston series. Darrall Imhoff was thrust into the starting center spot and played well for the 76ers. But Boston won the first three straight behind seven ten-point scorers to beat Philadelphia's strong starting five and win the series. The top two teams in the East were now gone in the very first round of the playoffs.

The Lakers beat their California rival, the San Francisco Warriors, four games to two. San Francisco had gotten another huge year from center Nate Thurmond, which much help from Rudy LaRusso and Jeff Mullins, all 20-point scorers. But Warriors scoring was much quieter in this series, and the league's top rebounding club was up against Chamberlain. After going down 0–2, the Lakers won four straight keyed by Van Breda Kolff's fiery coaching. Bay Area fans could only wonder about their team as Rick Barry was leading Oakland, coached by Alex Hannum, to the ABA title across the Bay.

The Atlanta Hawks also beat San Diego 4–2, winning Game Six by only a basket. San Diego's John Block missed that game with a broken wrist, likely a deciding factor.

In round two, Boston was favored over New York in a battle of veterans against rising younger players. The Knicks lost the first two, including the opener in Madison Square Garden, before winning at home in Game Three. Before a large television audience, Boston won at home in Game Four 97–96 to go up three games to one. New York won Game Five, but Red Auerbach and Bill Russell were looking ahead to Game Six in Boston Garden. In another nail biter that foreshadowed future matchups, New York again lost 106–105 to the wily veterans. Boston, with the fourth-best East record, was in the NBA Finals.

In the West, the Lakers were edging the Hawks by just two points in each of the first two games, both in Los Angeles. The Hawks again were primarily playing their starters, while the Lakers rotated their four forwards. A big win in Atlanta behind Jerry West led to a 4–1 series win. They confidently waited while Boston barely survived New York. The Lakers certainly looked like favorites as another Boston-LA series started.

The Lakers got a big start by winning two close games at home to start the series. Los Angeles fans sensed their victory coming after years of frustration. But Boston won their two home games next, including an 89–88 nail biter in Game Four, keyed by a last-second basket by Sam Jones, before a strong television audience. The two teams then exchanged home wins again to force Game Seven in Los Angeles, where a Laker victory was eagerly expected by fans.

Five of Boston's top players in minutes played were over age 30, but they ran hard to pull out to a 17-point fourth quarter lead. With just over five minutes to play, and the Lakers down by 9, the 32-year-old Chamberlain came down awkwardly after a rebound try and limped to the bench in pain. Replaced by seven-foot back-up Mel Counts, the Lakers cut the margin to one, but stalled despite having several chances to take the lead. In the final minutes, Chamberlain had recovered enough to return and signaled to Van Breda Kolff to put him back in. But the Laker coach ignored him, thinking Counts could outlast the Celtic charge. He was wrong, and the Celtics reasserted command following a key shot by Don Nelson with a minute to play. Boston, winner of eleven out of the last thirteen NBA titles, gave Bill Russell his eleventh championship ring while Wilt watched from the bench, 108–106.

Van Breda Kolff's blunder also meant a whole new round of criticism for Chamberlain, who was also blasted in the press by Russell, who retired after the series. Chamberlain had chosen not to shoot in the playoffs, averaging just 14 points per game, while concentrating on defense and rebounding. The quiet, well-mannered West was also outraged with his coach, his outstanding 31 points and 7.5 assist averages in the playoffs again good only for second place.

The Celtics were again led by the all-around game of John Havlicek, just as they had been a year ago. However, the larger story was Bill Russell, the star player/coach, ending his career with his 11th NBA championship.

== Final standings ==
=== Eastern Division ===
Eastern Division	W	L	PCT	GB	Home	Road	Neutral	Div
x-Baltimore Bullets	57	25	.695	–	29–9	24–15	4–1	26–14
x-Philadelphia 76ers	55	27	.671	2	26–8	24–16	5–3	23–17
x-New York Knicks	54	28	.659	3	30–7	19–20	5–1	26–14
x-Boston Celtics	48	34	.585	9	24–12	21–19	3–3	23–17
Cincinnati Royals	41	41	.500	16	15-13	16–21	10–7	20–20
Detroit Pistons	32	50	.390	25	21–17	7–30	4–3	13–27
Milwaukee Bucks	27	55	.329	30	15–19	8–27	4–9	7–29

=== Western Division ===
Western Division	W	L	PCT	GB	Home	Road	Neutral	Div
x-Los Angeles Lakers	55	27	.671	–	32–9	21–18	2–0	30–10
x-Atlanta Hawks	48	34	.585	7	28–12	18–21	2–1	26–14
x-San Francisco Warriors	41	41	.500	14	22–19	18–21	1–1	20–20
x-San Diego Rockets	37	45	.451	18	25–16	8–25	4–4	20–20
Chicago Bulls	33	49	.402	22	19–21	12–25	2–3	19–21
Seattle SuperSonics	30	52	.366	25	18–18	6–29	6–5	15–23
Phoenix Suns	16	66	.195	39	11–26	4–28	1–12	8–30

x – clinched playoff spot

== Playoffs ==
Division Semifinals
E1	Baltimore*	0
E3	New York	4
Eastern Division
E4	Boston	4
E2	Philadelphia	1
W1	Los Angeles*	4
W3	San Francisco	2
Western Division
W4	San Diego	2
W2	Atlanta	4

Division Finals
E3	New York	2
E4	Boston	4
W1	Los Angeles*	4
W2	Atlanta	1

NBA Finals
E4	Boston	4
W1	Los Angeles	3

- * Division winner
- Bold Series winner
- Italic Team with home-court advantage in NBA Finals

== Statistics leaders ==
Category	Player	Team	Stat
Points	Elvin Hayes	San Diego Rockets	2,327
Rebounds	Wilt Chamberlain	Los Angeles Lakers	1,712
Assists	Oscar Robertson	Cincinnati Royals	772
FG%	Wilt Chamberlain	Los Angeles Lakers	.583
FT%	Larry Siegfried	Boston Celtics	.864

Note: Prior to the 1969–70 season, league leaders in points, rebounds, and assists were determined by totals rather than averages.

== NBA awards ==
- Most Valuable Player: Wes Unseld, Baltimore Bullets
- Rookie of the Year: Wes Unseld, Baltimore Bullets
- Coach of the Year: Gene Shue, Baltimore Bullets
- All-NBA First Team:
  - F – Elgin Baylor, Los Angeles Lakers
  - F – Billy Cunningham, Philadelphia 76ers
  - C – Wes Unseld, Baltimore Bullets
  - G – Earl Monroe, Baltimore Bullets
  - G – Oscar Robertson, Cincinnati Royals
- All-NBA Second Team:
  - F – Dave DeBusschere, New York Knicks
  - F – John Havlicek, Boston Celtics
  - C – Willis Reed, New York Knicks
  - G – Hal Greer, Philadelphia 76ers
  - G – Jerry West, Los Angeles Lakers
- NBA All-Rookie Team:
  - Gary Gregor, Phoenix Suns
  - Art Harris, Seattle SuperSonics
  - Elvin Hayes, San Diego Rockets
  - Bill Hewitt, Los Angeles Lakers
  - Wes Unseld, Baltimore Bullets
- NBA All-Defensive First Team:
  - Dave DeBusschere, New York Knicks
  - Walt Frazier, New York Knicks
  - Bill Russell, Boston Celtics
  - Jerry Sloan, Chicago Bulls
  - Nate Thurmond, San Francisco Warriors
- NBA All-Defensive Second Team:
  - Bill Bridges, Atlanta Hawks
  - John Havlicek, Boston Celtics
  - Rudy LaRusso, San Francisco Warriors
  - Tom Sanders, Boston Celtics
  - Jerry West, Los Angeles Lakers

== See also ==
- 1969 NBA Finals
- 1969 NBA playoffs
- 1968–69 ABA season
- List of NBA regular season records
