= History of the Houston Rockets =

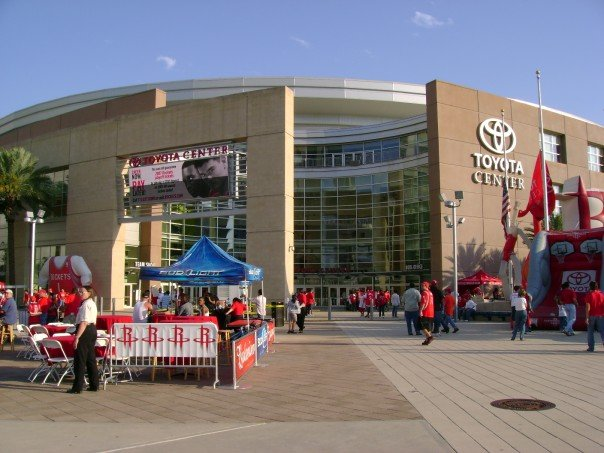
The Rockets moved into the Toyota Center at the start of the 2003–2004 season.

The Houston Rockets are an American professional basketball team based in Houston, Texas. The team plays in the Southwest Division of the Western Conference in the National Basketball Association (NBA). The team was established in 1967, and played in San Diego, California, for four years, before moving to Houston.

In the Rockets' debut season, they won 15 games. After drafting Elvin Hayes first overall in the 1968 NBA draft, they made their first appearance in the playoffs in 1969. After Hayes was traded, Moses Malone replaced him. Malone won two Most Valuable Player (MVP) awards during his time in Houston, and he led the Rockets to the 1978 conference finals in his first year with the Rockets. He also took the Rockets to the NBA Finals in 1981, but they were defeated in six games by the Boston Celtics.

Two years after advancing to the finals, the Rockets traded Malone and had two losing seasons, with the first having a franchise-low 14 victories. This gave Houston two straight first overall picks, used to bring future Hall of Famers Ralph Sampson and Hakeem Olajuwon, who eventually got the Rockets all the way to the 1986 Finals, where they lost again to Boston. In the next seven seasons, they lost in the first round of the playoffs five times. They did not win their first championship until 1994, when Olajuwon led them to a franchise-best 58 wins, and the championship. The Rockets repeated the feat in 1995, but have not appeared again in the NBA Finals since. They missed the playoffs from 1999 to 2003, and did not reach the playoffs again until they drafted Yao Ming in 2003. However, they would not advance past the first round of the playoffs for 13 years. In the 2007–08 NBA season, the Rockets had their most successful campaign in the 2000s, winning 55 games, with 22 of those victories in a row, but still lost in the first round. The following season, the team managed to win a playoff series for the first time since 1997, defeating the Portland Trail Blazers in the first round of the 2009 NBA Playoffs and pushed the eventual champion Los Angeles Lakers to seven games in the 2009 Western Conference Semifinals.

During the next decade, the Rockets rehauled their roster and were again contenders for the NBA title. In the 2014–15 NBA season, led by head coach Kevin McHale and guard James Harden, the Rockets won their first division title in 21 years, and reached the Western Conference Finals for the first time since 1997.

== 1967–1971: San Diego Rockets ==
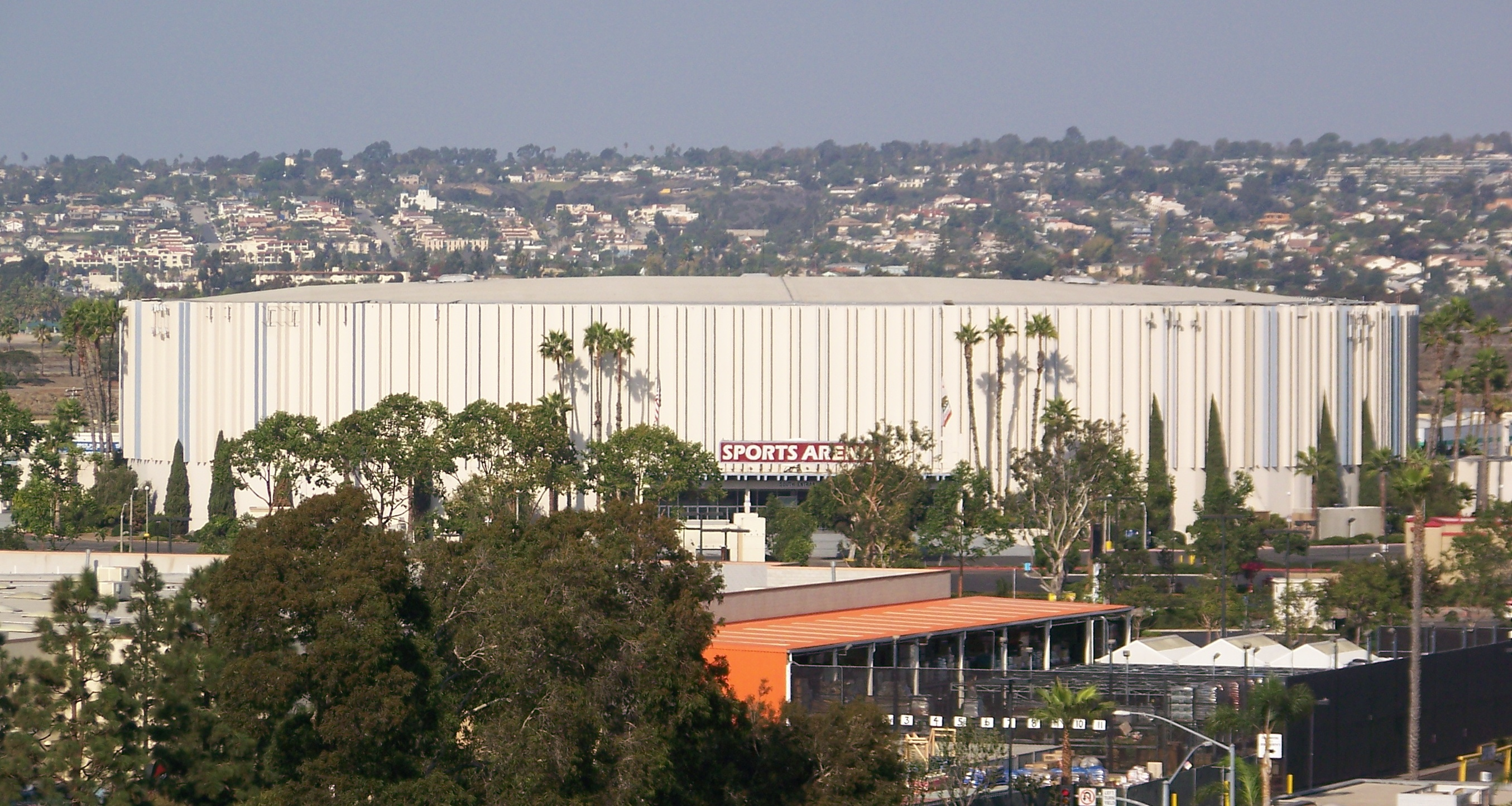
During the Rockets' years in San Diego, they played in the San Diego Sports Arena.

Once National Basketball Association commissioner J. Walter Kennedy visited San Diego in 1966 and saw the support for the Western Hockey League's San Diego Gulls, he invited Robert Breitbard, owner of the Gulls and their arena, the San Diego International Sports Center, to the next NBA owners' meeting. The league wanted to add other franchises in the Western United States, by then only represented through the Los Angeles Lakers and the San Francisco Warriors, and the owners liked Breitbard's input during the meeting. Combining the city economic and population growths with the Gulls' success, San Diego was chosen to receive an expansion team in 1967. Breitbard paid a $1.75 million entry fee to join the NBA as an expansion team for the 1967–68 NBA season, along with the Seattle SuperSonics. The resulting contest to name the franchise chose the name "Rockets", homaging San Diego's theme of "a city in motion" and the local arm of General Dynamics developing the Atlas missile and booster rocket program. Breitbard brought in Jack McMahon, then coach of the Cincinnati Royals, to serve as the Rockets' coach and general manager. The team then built its roster with both veteran players at an expansion draft, and college players in the 1967 NBA draft, where San Diego's first ever draft pick was Pat Riley. The Rockets' inaugural game was held on October 14, 1967, at the International Sports Center, with 8000 fans seeing the Rockets lose closely to the St. Louis Hawks by 99–98. The Rockets lost 67 games in their inaugural season, which was then an NBA record for losses in a season. Attendance ranked as eighth among the league's twelve teams, leading to financial losses. The sole bright spot of the inaugural season was forward Don Kojis, whose good numbers earned him a spot at the 1968 NBA All-Star Game.

In 1968, after the Rockets won a coin toss against the Baltimore Bullets to determine who would have the first overall pick in the 1968 NBA draft, they selected Elvin Hayes from the University of Houston. Hayes led the team to the franchise's first ever playoff appearance in 1969, but the Rockets lost in the semi-finals of the Western Division to the Atlanta Hawks, four games to two. In 1970 NBA draft, the Rockets drafted Calvin Murphy and Rudy Tomjanovich, who would both spend their whole careers with the Rockets.

Despite being coached by Hall of Fame coach Alex Hannum, the Rockets only tallied a 67–97 record and did not make the playoffs in the next two seasons. Because of poor performance and attendance, Breitbard sold the team in 1971 to Texas Sports Investments, which was led by real estate broker Wayne Duddleston and banker Billy Goldberg. The group bought the franchise for $5.6 million, and immediately moved the team to Houston. The franchise became the first NBA team in Texas, and the team's nickname of "Rockets" took on even greater relevance after the move since Houston is home to NASA's Lyndon B. Johnson Space Center. Houston previously was awarded an NBA expansion franchise along with Buffalo, Cleveland and Portland on February 6, 1970, but the new entry folded six weeks later on March 20 when its investment group led by Alan Rothenberg failed to make the $750,000 down payment on the $3.7 million entrance fee required before the league's college player draft. The NBA would return to San Diego in 1978, when the Buffalo Braves moved to the city to become the Clippers; they, too would leave the city for Los Angeles in 1984. Forty years after the Clippers left San Diego, the team moved their NBA G League affiliate from Ontario to Oceanside and adopted the San Diego Clippers name.

== 1971–1976: Improving in Houston with Murphy & Rudy-T ==
Upon their arrival, many were in disbelief that the Rockets could thrive in Houston. They were coming to a city that, at the time, had not shown much interest in professional basketball. Houston was previously home to the Houston Mavericks of the American Basketball Association for only two seasons between 1967 and 1969, where the average attendance was only 200, and even that figure may have been inflated. Despite its large size, Houston also lacked a suitable arena. The city's largest indoor arena was 34-year-old Sam Houston Coliseum, but it had not aged well. The Rockets quickly ruled out playing there even on a temporary basis. As Texas Sports Investments drew up plans for a proper arena, the Rockets were forced to play most of their games at the University of Houston's Hofheinz Pavilion, while playing occasional games at the Astrodome and San Antonio's HemisFair Arena.

Before the start of the 1971–72 NBA season, Hannum left for the Denver Rockets (later renamed Denver Nuggets) of the American Basketball Association, and University of Washington coach Tex Winter was hired in his place. However, Winter, who said that Hayes had "the worst fundamentals of any player" he had ever coached, applied a system that contrasted with the offensive style to which Hayes was accustomed. Because of the differences between Winter and Hayes, Houston traded Hayes, who had led the Rockets in scoring for four straight years, to the Baltimore Bullets for Jack Marin at the end of the 1971–72 season. Winter left soon after, being fired in January 1973 following a ten-game losing streak and with the Rockets as the second worst team of the league (ahead of only the infamous 76ers team which would finish 9-73), and was replaced by Johnny Egan.

With a 41–41 record, the Rockets would earn their first NBA Playoff berth in the 1975 NBA Playoffs since moving from San Diego as well as winning their first playoff series in franchise history by defeating the New York Knicks led by Walt Frazier and Earl Monroe in a 3-game mini series, but would ultimately bow to the upcoming champions Boston Celtics in 5 games in the semi-finals. The Rockets would move into their own arena, The Summit, the following season. The arena was located near Greenway Plaza, whose developer Kenneth Schnitzer became the Rockets' primary owner.

== 1976–1982: The Moses Malone era ==
Due to Egan's failure to qualify for the playoffs, as soon as the season ended he was replaced by coach Tom Nissalke. Nissalke knew the Rockets had firepower but needed a rebounding center and a play-making guard, and he pressed the Rockets management to acquire college standout John Lucas – drafted first overall in the 1976 NBA draft, a pick Houston acquired by sending Gus Bailey, Joe Meriweather and the ninth pick to the Atlanta Hawks – and his former player at the ABA's Utah Stars Moses Malone – while Malone started the 1976–77 season with the Buffalo Braves, Houston acquired him by sending Buffalo first-round picks in the next two drafts. After Malone led the Rockets in rebounding for the first of six straight times, and established a then-NBA record for offensive rebounds in a season, the Rockets posted a franchise-best 49-wins and won the franchise's first Division Title finishing on top of the Central Division. After a first round bye in the playoffs, Houston defeated the Washington Bullets led by former Rocket Elvin Hayes as well as Wes Unseld in seven games in the Eastern Conference semi-finals, and advanced to the conference finals for the first time in their history, but they lost to the top-seeded Philadelphia 76ers led by former ABA superstar Julius Erving 4–2.

Early into 1977–78 season, at a game on December 9, 1977, Kevin Kunnert got into a fight with Kermit Washington of the Los Angeles Lakers. As Tomjanovich approached the altercation, Washington turned and punched Tomjanovich squarely in the face, causing numerous fractures in his face. Tomjanovich spent the next five months in rehabilitation and returned to appear in the 1978 All-Star Game, but his averages significantly declined after the injury, and Houston finished with just 28 wins in the season.

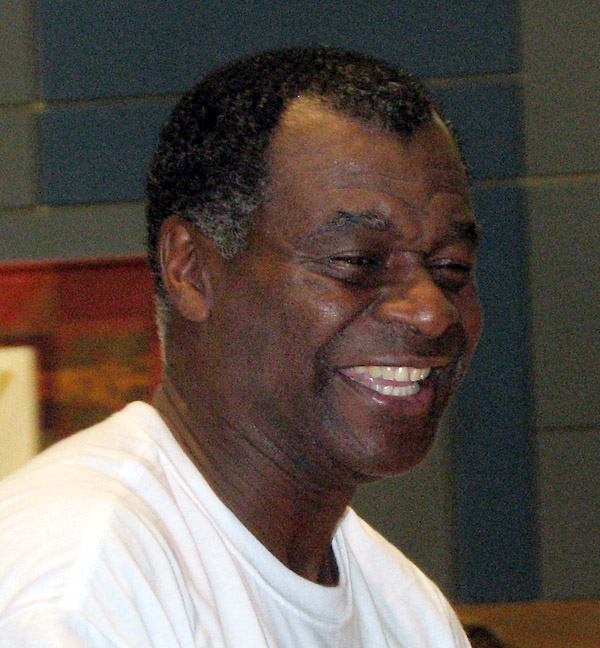
Calvin Murphy played all 13 of his seasons with the Rockets, and went on to become the team's color commentator.

In the following season, Malone, Murphy, and Tomjanovich all played in the 1979 NBA All-Star Game, and Malone received the 1979 MVP Award. The Rockets also sent John Lucas II to the Golden State Warriors in exchange for Rick Barry, who went on to set the NBA record at the time for free throw percentage in a season by shooting 94.7%. The Rockets went 47–35 in Nissalke's last season as coach, and finished second in the Central Division, but they lost to Atlanta in a best-of-three first round series.

In 1979 George Maloof, a businessperson from Albuquerque, New Mexico, bought the Rockets for $9 million. He died the following year, and while the Maloof family expressed interest in selling the team, George's 24-year-old son Gavin took over the Rockets. A buyer was eventually found in 1982 as businessman Charlie Thomas purchased the franchise for $11 million; the Maloofs would later own the Sacramento Kings from 1998 to 2013. The Maloof period of ownership marked the first dominant period of the Rockets, led by new coach Del Harris. In Houston's 1979–80 campaign, the team finished with a 41–41 record, tying the San Antonio Spurs for second place in the Central Division. The Rockets defeated the Spurs two games to one in their first round playoff series, they were swept by the Boston Celtics in the Eastern Conference semi-finals.

In the 1980–81 season, after the newly established Dallas Mavericks became the third NBA team in Texas, the NBA restructured the conferences and sent the Rockets, who had previously played in the Eastern Conference, to the Midwest Division of the Western Conference. In Harris's second season, Houston tied with Kansas City for second place in the Midwest Division behind San Antonio with a 40–42 record, and qualified for the playoffs with just one game left. During the season, Murphy set two NBA records, by sinking 78 consecutive free throws to break Rick Barry's mark of 60 set in 1976, and achieving a free-throw percentage of .958, breaking Barry's record set with the Rockets in 1979. In the playoffs, Houston began a run that began when they upset Los Angeles two games to one, and then defeated George Gervin's Spurs four games to three in the Western Conference semifinals. This resulted in a conference finals matchup with the Kansas City Kings, who were led by Otis Birdsong, Scott Wedman, and Phil Ford. When the Kings fell to the Rockets in five games, the Rockets became the only team in NBA history to advanced to the Finals after having a losing record in the regular season. However, after splitting the first four games of the series with Boston, Houston eventually lost in six games. The following season, the Rockets improved their regular season mark to 46–36 but were eliminated in the first round of the playoffs by the Seattle SuperSonics 4 games to 1 (marking the first of 6 postseason meeting between the two franchises). Although Malone won the MVP in that season, and new owner Charlie Thomas expressed interest in renewing his contract, in the following offseason, the Rockets traded him to the Philadelphia 76ers for Caldwell Jones, to avoid paying his salary. When the Rockets finished a league worst 14–68, Celtics coach Bill Fitch was hired to replace outgoing Del Harris, and after winning a coin flip with the Indiana Pacers to obtain the first pick of the 1983 NBA draft, the Rockets selected Ralph Sampson from the University of Virginia. Sampson had good numbers as the Rockets finished only 29–53 in the 1983–1984 season, averaging 21 points and 11 rebounds per game and earning the NBA Rookie of the Year award.

== 1984–2001: The Hakeem Olajuwon era ==
Hakeem Olajuwon and Jim Petersen surround Kevin McHale (who would 25 years later become Houston's coach) during the 1986 NBA Finals.

=== 1984–1987: The Twin Towers era ===
Houston was again given the first pick of the 1984 NBA draft, and they used it to select Hakeem Olajuwon from the University of Houston. In his first season, Olajuwon finished second to Michael Jordan in NBA Rookie of the Year balloting, and the Rockets record improved by 19 games, although they were eliminated in the first round of the playoffs.

In the following season, both Olajuwon and Sampson were named to the Western Conference All-Stars in that year's all-star game, and the duo was nicknamed the "Twin Towers". Houston won the Midwest Division title with a 51–31 record. In contrast to the other guard-oriented teams of the Western Conference, the Rockets had a high rotation on the position – John Lucas left the team 65 games into the season, Allen Leavell replaced him for 12 games before breaking his wrist, and Robert Reid took over as the starter from the final game of the regular season on. During the playoffs, the Rockets swept the Sacramento Kings before a hard-fought series with Alex English's Denver Nuggets, including one game going to double overtime in the exhausting altitude of the Mile-High City. The young squad grinded it out and eventually pulled away with the victory over the Nuggets 4–2. When faced with defending champion Lakers in the Conference Finals, the Rockets were ready to knock off their rivals who had the best of them during the regular season. The Rockets, however, were blown out of Game 1 with Olajuwon's spinning reverse dunks and Sampson's alley-oops notwithstanding. Embarrassed by the loss, Olajuwon and the Rockets stormed back to shock the star-studded defending champions with 4 straight wins in an impressive four games to one series victory, a feat that no other Western Conference team had come close to doing against the Showtime Lakers. Sampson's buzzer beater that won Game 5 was described by him as "the greatest moment of my basketball career". The Rockets competed in the finals for only the second time in team history, once again facing the Celtics. Boston sportswriters were not happy about not getting a shot at revenge against the Lakers who had beaten the Celtics in the Finals the year before, yet the matchup was interesting with the young front court challenging the playoff-hardened Celtics front court of Bird, McHale and Parish. The Celtics won the first two games at the Boston Garden, only for the Rockets to win two games once the series went back to Houston – a close game 3 under Sampson's leadership, and a 15 point-leading game 5 without him as he got ejected – while also losing game 4 due to late Larry Bird 3 pointers and untimely turnovers by Rockets guard Mitchell Wiggins. Game 6 went back to Boston with Sampson finding himself again in foul trouble and of little effect against the older and wiser Celtics. After the series, Boston coach KC Jones called the Rockets, "the new monsters on the block" with the future looking very bright for the Rockets. During the six-game championship series loss against the Celtics, Sampson averaged 14.8 points on .438 shooting, 9.5 rebounds and 3.3 assists per game.

In the next year, the Rockets started poorly, winning only 15 of the first 33 games amidst injuries among the star players and off-court controversies for the rest of the roster, such as Lewis Lloyd and Mitchell Wiggins getting suspended for cocaine use. The team still made the playoffs, and advanced to the second round past favored Clyde Drexler and his Portland Trail Blazers (eventually proving to be their last playoff victory until 1993), before being eliminated by the Seattle SuperSonics in Game 6, a double-overtime classic in which Olajuwon scored 49 points in the losing cause.

While Sampson signed a new deal prior to the 1987–88 NBA season, he was traded early in the season to the Golden State Warriors in exchange for Joe Barry Carroll and Sleepy Floyd. Sampson only learned of the trade once he arrived in Houston after a road game. The Twin Towers were split just 18 months after their finals appearance.

=== 1987–1992: Lean years ===
During the next three seasons, the Rockets were eliminated three straight times in the first round of the playoffs, with the first of those in 1988, the Dallas Mavericks defeating the Rockets in four games, leading to Fitch's dismissal. Don Chaney was hired to replace him and lead the Rockets to the playoffs in his first season in Houston, losing to the Seattle SuperSonics in four games thanks to a buzzer-beater that ended the Rockets season.

Chaney was named the Coach of the Year for the 1990–91 season, after leading the Rockets to a 52–30 record despite Olajuwon's absence due to injury for 25 games. The Rockets were once again eliminated in the first round of the playoffs, 3–0 to the Lakers. Midway through the next season, with the Rockets' record only 26–26, Chaney was fired and replaced by one of his assistants, former Houston player Tomjanovich. Although the Rockets did not make the playoffs, in the next year, the Rockets won-loss record improved by 13 games, as they won 55 games. Olajuwon won the NBA Defensive Player of the Year Award, and the Rockets clinched the Midwest title. The playoffs started with Houston's first series victory in 5 years by defeating the Los Angeles Clippers, before an elimination by the SuperSonics during a game 7 overtime loss in one of the classic postseason series in NBA History.

=== 1993–1995: Back to back championships ===
On July 30, 1993, Leslie Alexander purchased the Rockets for $85 million. In Tomjanovich's second full year as head coach, the Rockets began the 1993–94 season by tying an NBA record with start of 15–0. Led by Olajuwon, who was named the MVP and Defensive Player of the Year, the Rockets won a franchise-record 58 games. The Rockets recovered from being two games down to the Phoenix Suns in the second round of the playoffs, to advance to the finals. Houston was once again down by three games to two to the New York Knicks, but they managed to win the last two games on their home court, and claim their first championship in franchise history. Olajuwon was awarded the Finals MVP, after averaging 27 points, nine rebounds and four blocked shots a game.

The Rockets initially struggled in the first half of the 1994–95 season, and ended up winning only 47 games, which was 11 games lower than their previous year's total. In a midseason trade with Portland, the Rockets obtained guard Clyde Drexler, a former teammate of Olajuwon at the University of Houston, in exchange for Otis Thorpe. Houston entered the playoffs as the sixth seed in the Western Conference, but then started a strong playoff run that earned the nickname "Clutch City". After pushing the 60–22 Utah Jazz to five games, the Rockets were down by seven points with 5:40 remaining before Drexler led a comeback. They fell behind 3–1 to the 59–23 Phoenix Suns in the second round, but won three straight to win the series, and became only the first team in NBA history to overcome both a 2–0 and a 3–1 series deficit in a seven-game series. The Rockets then beat in the conference finals the 62–20 San Antonio Spurs, which included that season's MVP David Robinson, with Olajuwon, averaging 35.3 points and 12.5 rebounds. The return to the Finals was against the Orlando Magic, led by Shaquille O'Neal and Penny Hardaway. When Houston swept the series in four straight games, they became the first team in NBA history to win the championship as a sixth seed – still the champion with the lowest seed, and the only without home court in any round – and the first to beat four 50-win teams in a single postseason en route to the championship. Olajuwon was named the Finals MVP, becoming only the second player after Michael Jordan to win the award two years in a row.

During the offseason, the Rockets went for a change of visual identity, making navy blue and silver the new primary colors while adopting a new cartoon-inspired logo and pinstriped jerseys. The Rockets won 48 games in the 1995–96 campaign, in which Olajuwon became the NBA's all-time leader in blocked shots. They beat the Lakers in the first round of the playoffs, but were swept by the eventual Western Conference Champions Seattle SuperSonics in the second round.

=== 1996–1999: The Big Three era ===
Before the start of the succeeding season, the Rockets made a dramatic trade that sent four players to Phoenix in exchange for Charles Barkley. The resulting "Big Three" of Olajuwon, Drexler, and Barkley led the Rockets to a 57–25 record, and Houston swept Minnesota in the first round. However, after a 7-game battle with Seattle (which was their first, and to date, the only Playoff Series Victory over the Supersonics in another classic series), the Rockets fell in the Western Conference finals to the Utah Jazz, a team they had beaten on their way to championships in 1994 and 1995.

The 1997–98 season was marked by injuries, and the team finished 41–41 with the eighth seed in the Western Conference. Houston once again faced the Jazz, this time in the first round, and they lost the series 3–2. Drexler retired after the season, and the Rockets made another bold trade to bring in Scottie Pippen to take his place. In the strike-shortened 1998–99 season, the Rockets went 31–19, but lost to the Lakers in the first round 3–1 in the playoffs.

=== The end of The Big Three era ===
After the 1999 draft, the Rockets traded for the second overall pick Steve Francis from the Vancouver Grizzlies, in exchange for four players and a first round draft pick. However, after Houston traded a discontented Pippen to Portland (stating chemistry problems with old rival and now teammate Barkley), and Barkley suffered a career-ending injury, the rebuilt Rockets went 34–48 and missed the playoffs, for only the second time in 15 years. In the 2000–01 season, the Rockets worked their way to a 45–37 record, but still did not make the playoffs. In the following offseason, a 38-year-old Olajuwon requested a trade, and, despite stating their desire to keep him, the Rockets reached a sign and trade agreement, sending him to the Toronto Raptors. The proceeding season was unremarkable, as Houston's first season without Olajuwon in almost 20 years finished with a disappointing 28–54 record.

== 2002–2011: The Yao Ming era ==
With the first overall pick in the 2002 NBA draft, the Rockets selected Yao Ming, a 7-foot 6-inch Chinese center. The Rockets' record improved by 15 games, but they missed the playoffs by one game.

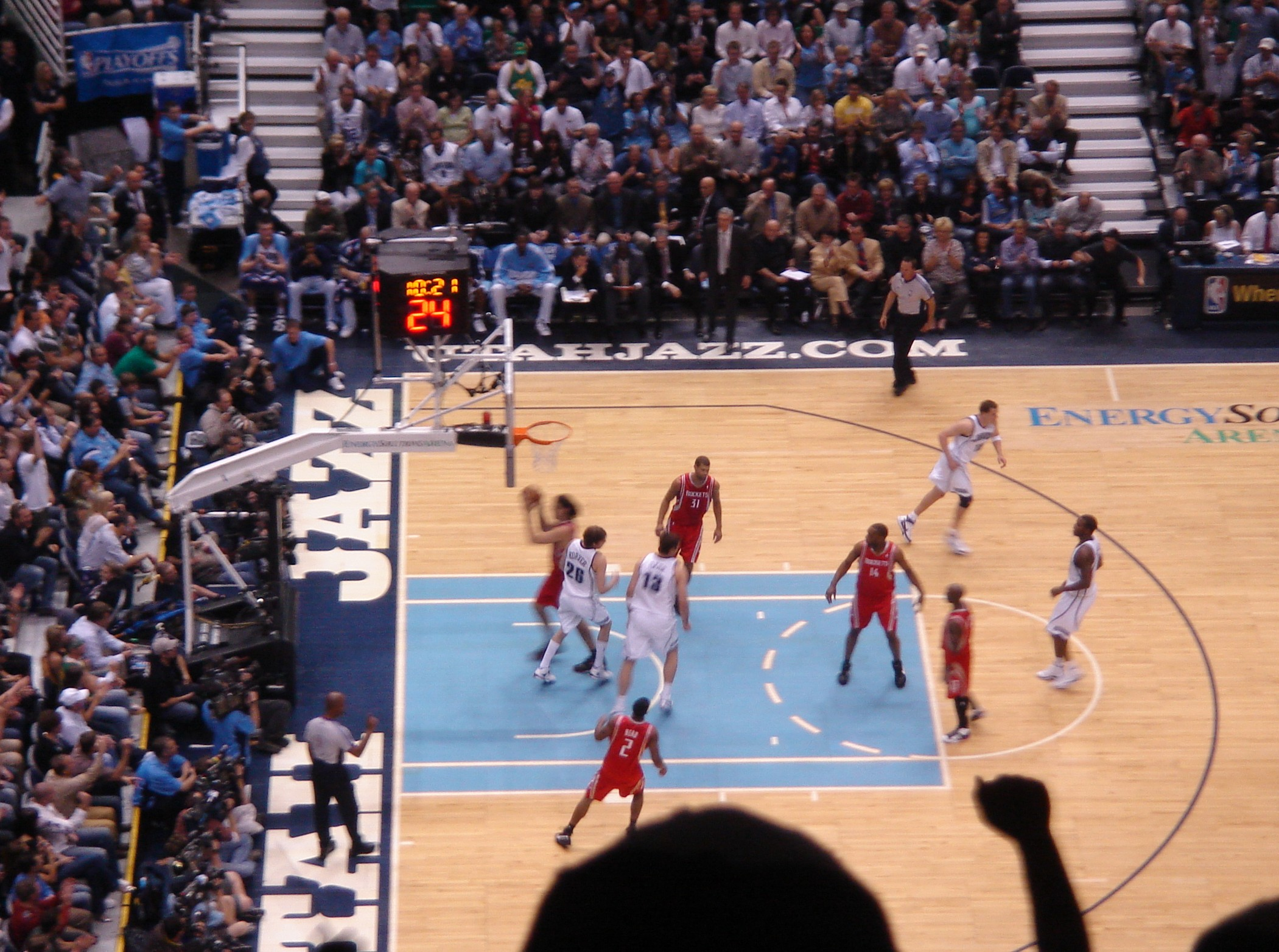
The Rockets playing the Utah Jazz in the 2008 playoffs

In the following season, Houston began playing in their new arena, the Toyota Center, and redesigned their uniforms and logo, as long-time coach Tomjanovich resigned after being diagnosed with bladder cancer, and was replaced by Jeff Van Gundy. The Rockets finished the regular season with a record of 45–37, and earned their first playoff berth since 1999, but the Lakers again handed the Rockets a loss in the first round.

=== 2004–2010: Yao and McGrady duo ===
In the offseason, Houston saw major changes in the roster as the Rockets acquired Tracy McGrady in a seven-player deal with the Orlando Magic. The 2004–05 season saw McGrady and Yao lead the Rockets to their best record in 10 years, finishing at 51–31 and seeded fifth in the Western Conference playoffs. However, their season ended in the first round of the playoffs as they lost to their in-state rival, the Dallas Mavericks, in seven games, despite leading the series 2–0.

The following season, after an injury-plagued year in which McGrady and Yao missed a total of 70 games, the team finished with only 34 wins, and missed the playoffs. The Rockets improved by 18 games the next year, with 52 wins, but once again lost in the first round after leading 2–0, when they lost in seven games to Utah. After the loss, Van Gundy was fired, and the Rockets hired Rick Adelman to replace him. In the following year, despite Yao suffering a season-ending injury for the third year in a row, the Rockets won 22 consecutive games, which is the second longest winning streak in NBA history. This streak included going 13–0 in the month of February, making them the first team since the 1996 Chicago Bulls to finish an entire month undefeated. Houston finished their season 55–27, but were eliminated for the second year in row by the Jazz in the first round of the playoffs, 4 games to 2.

In the next off-season, the Rockets acquired Ron Artest from the Sacramento Kings. The new "Big Three" of McGrady, Yao, and Artest barely played any games together due to nagging injuries. McGrady's knee bothered him for much of the year, hampering his performance, and he eventually opted for mid-season microfracture surgery which would keep him out for the season. Despite this, the team then went on to win 53 games that season and earned themselves a first-round match-up with the Portland Trail Blazers. Houston struck fast, blowing the Trailblazers out on the road in game one en route to a 4–2 series win and their first time advancing from the first round since 1997. The games against the Blazers were also the last ever of veteran center Dikembe Mutombo's career, as he injured his knee and was forced to retire after 18 seasons in the NBA. However, despite winning the first game of the 2009 Western Conference Semifinals against the Los Angeles Lakers, the Rockets ended up losing a tough-fought series in seven games, and saw Yao leave with an injury, that eventually sidelined him for the upcoming season. During the off-season, sixth man Von Wafer left for Greece, and Artest left the team after signing with the Lakers, but the Rockets acquired Laker defensive star Trevor Ariza using the Disabled Player Exception granted by the league due to Yao's injury.

On September 23, 2009, the Rockets unveiled new alternate uniforms, which were inspired by the 1994–95 championship uniforms and featured similar colors. On February 18, 2010, hours before the trade deadline, the Rockets acquired Kevin Martin, Jordan Hill, Hilton Armstrong, and Jared Jeffries in a three-team trade that sent Tracy McGrady to the New York Knicks, and Joey Dorsey and Carl Landry to the Sacramento Kings. Despite the stellar play of Martin and Aaron Brooks, with the latter being named the NBA Most Improved Player, the Rockets could not make it to the playoffs, finishing 42–40, 3rd in the Southwest Division. At that time, the Rockets set an NBA record for best record by a team with no All-Stars.

The Rockets drafted Patrick Patterson of Kentucky with the 14th pick in the 2010 NBA Draft. On July 15, the Rockets signed free agent Brad Miller. About one month later, Trevor Ariza was traded to the New Orleans Hornets in a four-team, five-player trade. The Rockets received Courtney Lee from the New Jersey Nets in return.

The 2010–11 NBA season started badly for the Rockets, who lost the first five games. In the seventh, Yao Ming injured his left ankle in what was just his fifth game that season. After being examined, what was thought to be a mild sprain turned out to be a stress fracture which kept Yao off of the court for another season. In July 2011, Yao, only 30, retired after a series of unfortunate injuries cut his career short.

By the All-Star break in February 2011, the Rockets were 26–31. On February 24, 2011, the Rockets traded Shane Battier to the Memphis Grizzlies for Hasheem Thabeet and a first-round pick. They also traded Aaron Brooks to the Phoenix Suns for Goran Dragić and a first-round pick. Afterwards the team won 15 games out of 20, reaching a winning record and contending for a playoff spot. The team entered April with chances of qualifying for the postseason, but for the second straight season the Rockets failed to make the playoffs after losing to the New Orleans Hornets in Louisiana with three games remaining. The team still finished the year with a 43-39 winning record. Head coach Rick Adelman left the Rockets right after the season.

== 2011–2012: Rebuilding ==
On June 1, 2011, the Rockets named Kevin McHale their next head coach. With the 14th pick of the 2011 NBA Draft, the Houston Rockets selected Marcus Morris from the University of Kansas. With the 38th pick in that same draft, they selected Chandler Parsons from the University of Florida. During an offseason extended by the 2011 NBA lockout, the Rockets' front office started to plan a roster overhaul, and after the lockout ended, the team tried to use their cap space to attract many high-profile free agents, including Chris Paul, Nenê and Pau Gasol.

Nearing the trade deadline on March 15, 2012, the Rockets traded Hasheem Thabeet and Jonny Flynn to the Portland Trail Blazers for Marcus Camby. The Rockets also sent Jordan Hill to the Lakers in return for Derek Fisher (who was waived shortly after and signed with the Thunder) and a first-round pick in the 2012 NBA draft. During the strike-shortened 2011–12 season, the Rockets were eliminated from playoff contention during the season's penultimate game against eventual champions Miami Heat.

Before the 2012 NBA draft, the Milwaukee Bucks traded the 12th overall pick, Shaun Livingston, Jon Brockman, and Jon Leuer to the Rockets for the 14th overall pick and Samuel Dalembert. The Minnesota Timberwolves also traded the 18th pick in the draft to Houston for Chase Budinger. In the 2012 NBA Draft, Houston drafted Jeremy Lamb of Connecticut, Royce White of Iowa State, and Terrence Jones of Kentucky with the 12th, 16th, and 18th picks, respectively.

== 2012–2021: The James Harden era ==
=== 2012–2013: Return to the playoffs ===
During the 2012 NBA offseason, the Rockets made significant changes to their roster. Early in July, they traded Kyle Lowry to the Toronto Raptors, let Goran Dragić return to the Phoenix Suns via free agency, and saw the arrival of 2011 pick Donatas Motiejūnas from Lithuania, who was signed to a multiyear deal. On July 13, the Rockets released veteran forward Luis Scola using their one-time amnesty clause. On July 18, The Rockets signed Jeremy Lin, a restricted free agent, to a three-year, $25.1 million contract after the New York Knicks decided not to match the Rockets' offer sheet. Lin achieved worldwide fame with a 25-game stretch of high performance basketball play known as "Linsanity", where he stepped up in place of the Knicks' injured players. On July 20, Ömer Aşık, a restricted free agent from the Chicago Bulls, signed a three-year, $25.1 million offer sheet with the Rockets. The Bulls decided to not match the offer, and on July 24, Asik officially joined the Rockets. On October 27, 2012, the Rockets traded Kevin Martin, Jeremy Lamb, and two future first-round picks to the Oklahoma City Thunder for reigning sixth man of the year James Harden, along with Cole Aldrich, Daequan Cook, and Lazar Hayward. Harden stepped out of his previous sixth man role and into the starting lineup for the Rockets. He had 37 points, 12 assists, 6 rebounds, 4 steals, and a block in his debut as a Rocket, while Jeremy Lin had 12 points, 4 rebounds, 8 assists, and 4 steals. Harden also signed a 5-year contract extension with the Rockets worth approximately $80 million a few days after the trade was completed. Harden scored a then career-high 45 points in his second game with the Rockets against the Atlanta Hawks. Jeremy Lin tied a career-high of 38 points in an overtime loss to the Spurs while Harden sat out with an ankle sprain. Harden was selected to the 2013 NBA All-Star Game, which was held in Houston. On February 5, 2013, the Houston Rockets made 23 3-point field goals in a game against the Golden State Warriors, equaling the NBA team record. In this game, the Rockets also achieved a home game record for most points scored at the Toyota Center with a 140–109 victory.

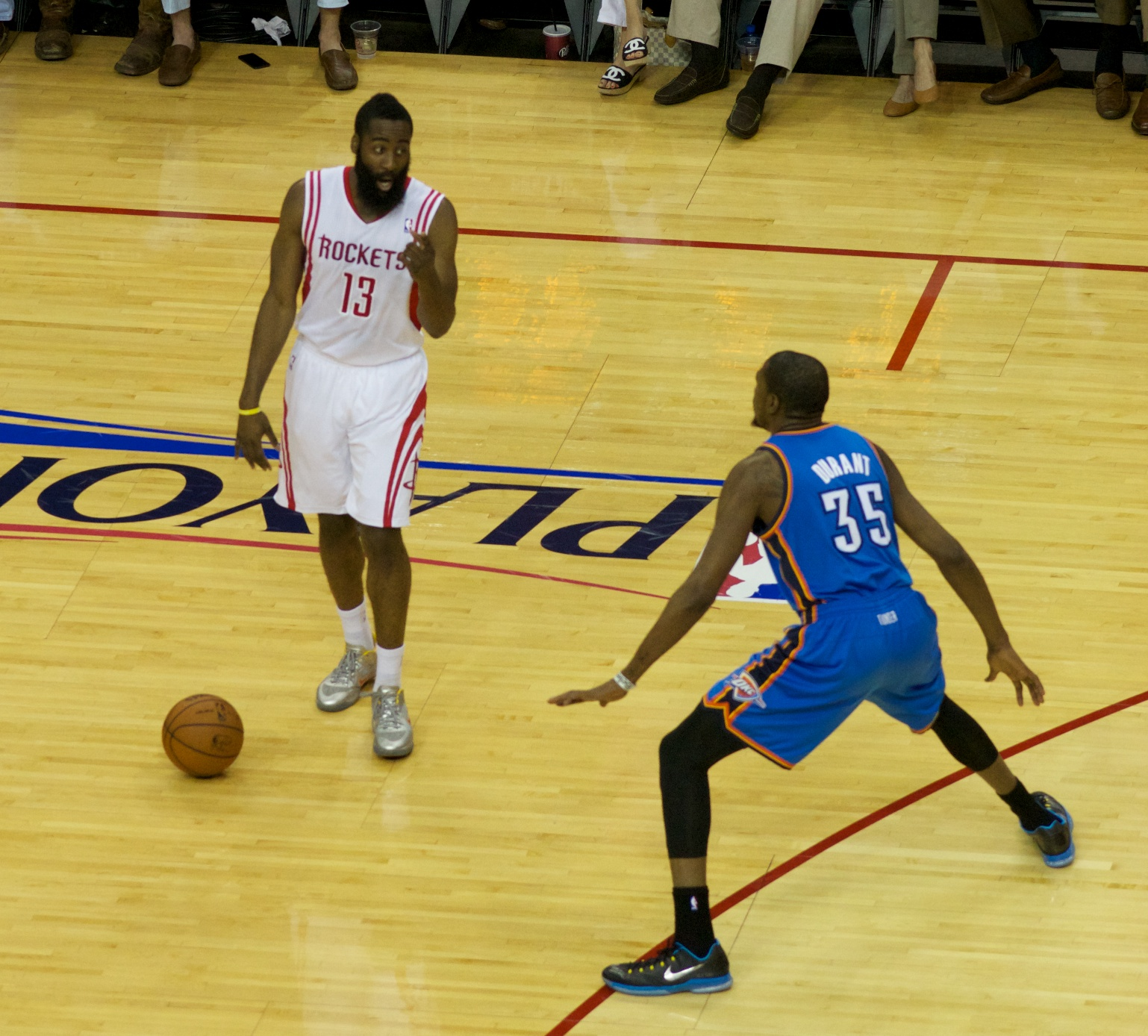
James Harden being guarded by Kevin Durant in the 2013 playoffs.

On February 20, 2013, the Rockets acquired Thomas Robinson, the fifth overall pick in the 2012 NBA draft, in a trade with the Sacramento Kings where Houston sent Marcus Morris and Patrick Patterson. On that same night, the Rockets defeated the Oklahoma City Thunder 122–119 after trailing by 14 with 6:58 remaining in the game. James Harden scored a then career high of 46 points in the win over his former team. Despite being the youngest team in the NBA, the Rockets became one of the highest scoring offenses in the NBA. Even more remarkable was that only two players – starting forward Chandler Parsons and backup forward/center Greg Smith (who rarely played in his rookie season) – were left from the 2011–12 roster. Head coach Kevin McHale ran an up-tempo offense that put emphasis on transition baskets, shooting three-pointers, and playing at a fast pace. As a result, the Rockets became one of the highest scoring offenses in the NBA, leading the league in scoring for the majority of the season. In the post-season, the Rockets fell to the Oklahoma City Thunder in the first round, losing the series 4–2. In the 2012–13 NBA season, James Harden evolved into a franchise player for the Rockets, averaging 25.9 points a game.

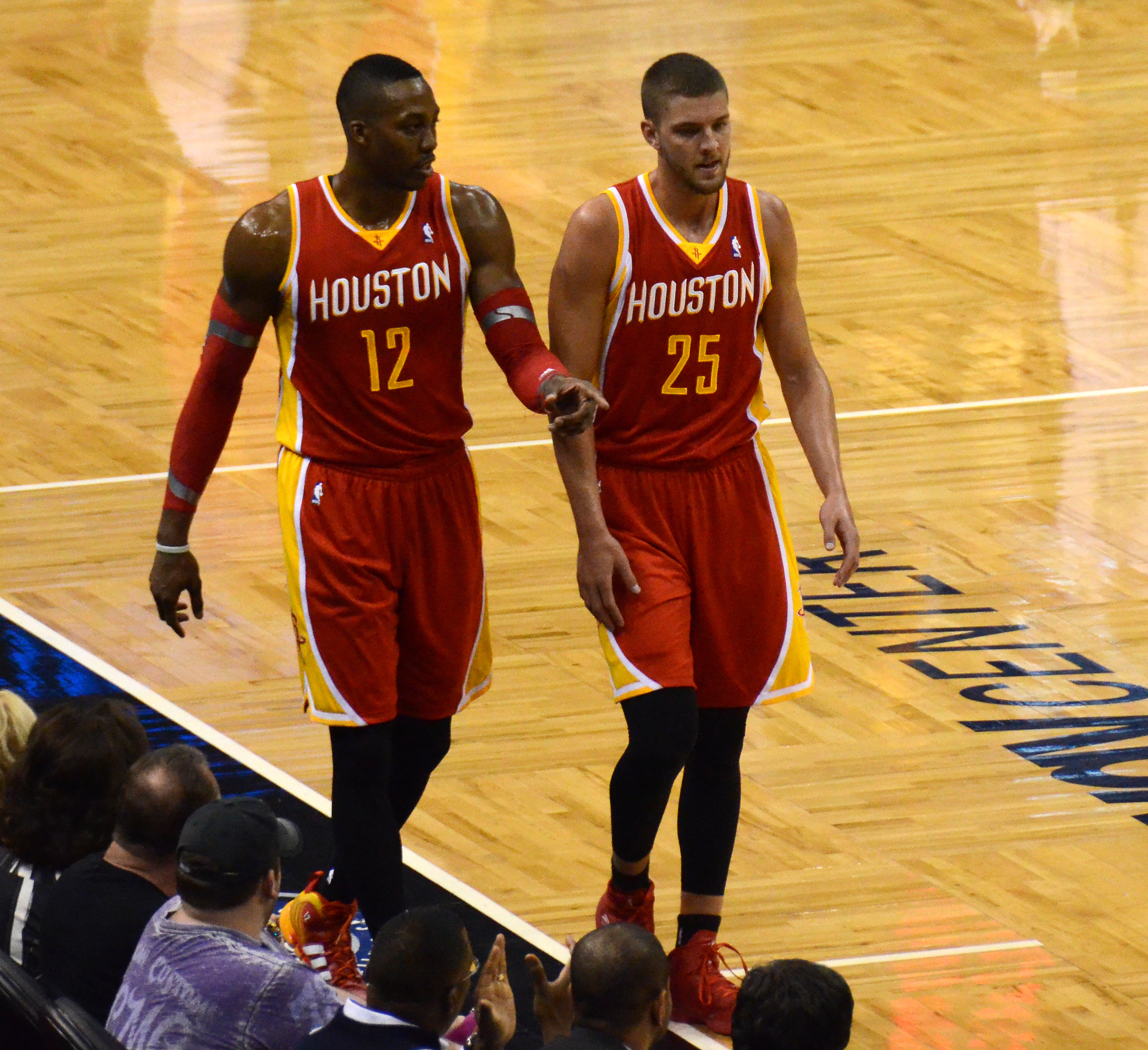
Dwight Howard and Chandler Parsons during a 2014 game.

=== 2013–2016: Harden and Howard duo ===
Eager to add another franchise player to their team, the Rockets heavily pursued free agent center Dwight Howard in the 2013 offseason. On July 5, 2013, Howard announced via his Twitter account that he intended to sign with the Houston Rockets after the July moratorium period ended. The NBA fined the Rockets $150,000 for talking about Howard during this moratorium period. Dwight Howard officially signed with the Rockets on July 13, 2013. Led by the new inside-out combination of Howard and James Harden, and with a strong supporting cast including Chandler Parsons, Jeremy Lin, and Ömer Aşık, the Rockets were expected to jump into title contention in the upcoming season. However, in the post-season, the Rockets were defeated in the first round by the Portland Trail Blazers, losing the series 4–2.

Following a season of ups-and-downs with injury and form, Jeremy Lin was traded to the Lakers on July 13, 2014. That same day, the Rockets declined to match the three-year, $46 million offer sheet that Chandler Parsons received from the Mavericks, and to compensate for his departure, the Rockets agreed to bring back Trevor Ariza on a four-year, $32 million deal in free agency. The deal was officially completed as a three-team trade, in which the Rockets received Ariza in a sign and trade from the Washington Wizards and traded Ömer Aşık to the New Orleans Pelicans.

With double-digit wins against the Lakers, Utah, Boston and Philadelphia to start the 2014–15 NBA season, the Rockets recorded a 4–0 start for the first time since they won their first six games of the 1996–97 season. By recording double-digit wins against Miami and San Antonio in their next two games, the Rockets won each of their first six games by 10 points or more, and became the first team to accomplish the feat since the 1985–86 Denver Nuggets. In December, the Rockets acquired Corey Brewer and Josh Smith, two veterans who added depth to the roster. While the Rockets had many key players miss time throughout the entire season, James Harden took it upon himself to keep the Rockets near the top of the conference, which turned him into an MVP front-runner. On March 20, 2015, Harden scored a career-high 50 points in a 118–108 victory over the Nuggets. Harden became the first Rocket to score 50 points since Hakeem Olajuwon scored 51 against the Celtics in 1996. On April 1, Harden scored 51 points in a 115–111 win over the Sacramento Kings, becoming the first player in franchise history to record multiple 50 point games in a season. On April 15, 2015, the Rockets won their 56th game of the season and finished with the third-best regular season record in franchise history. On that same night, the Rockets claimed their first ever Southwest Division title and first Division crown since 1994. In the playoffs, the Rockets beat the Mavericks 4–1 in the first round. In the Conference Semifinals, the Los Angeles Clippers built a 3–1 lead over the Rockets, before the Rockets won the last three games in the series to return to the Conference Finals for the first time in 18 years, this time against the Golden State Warriors. With their win over the Clippers, the Rockets became just the ninth team in NBA history to win a playoff series in which they faced a 3–1 deficit. In the Conference Finals, the Warriors won the first three games before Harden scored 45 points to win Game 4 at the Toyota Center. The Warriors then finished the series in Game 5, winning 4–1.

Prior to the 2015–16 season, the Rockets acquired Ty Lawson from the Denver Nuggets in exchange for Joey Dorsey, Nick Johnson, Kostas Papanikolaou, Pablo Prigioni, and a 2016 first round draft pick. Expectations were high for the Rockets coming into the season. Lawson was supposed to take some of the ball-handling pressures off of Harden, and they were bringing back nearly the same team that made it to the Western Conference Finals the previous year. However, things did not go according to plan. Kevin McHale was fired at the beginning of the season after the Rockets only won 4 of their first 11 games. J. B. Bickerstaff, his assistant, took over the head coaching duties. The Rockets struggled to remain in the playoff contention throughout the season due to inconsistent play and injuries. Lawson was waived mid-season in a buyout agreement. Houston only clinched the eight seed in the 2016 playoffs by beating the Kings in the last game of the regular season. In the first round of the playoffs, the Rockets played the Warriors, who were coming off a record-breaking regular season. The Rockets once again lost to the Warriors in 5 games.

After a disappointing season, the Rockets had to make some significant changes to their roster. Howard wasn't happy with his role and the team overall still lacked an identity. On June 1, 2016, the Rockets named Mike D'Antoni as their new head coach. Howard opted out of the final year of his contract later in June, and signed with the Atlanta Hawks in July. With Howard gone, Harden was now the undisputed franchise player. Harden reaffirmed his commitment to the franchise when he signed a four-year, $118.1 million contract extension in July. The Rockets also signed Ryan Anderson and Eric Gordon.

=== 2017–2019: Mike D'Antoni and Chris Paul ===
When the 2016–17 season started, Harden was off to a great start and was widely considered a top MVP runner along with Kawhi Leonard, alongside former teammate Russell Westbrook. When the season ended, the Rockets were third in both the Western Conference and overall rankings, a major improvement from the season before. D'Antoni was named the NBA Coach of the Year, Eric Gordon the Sixth Man of the Year, and Harden finished second in MVP voting to Russell Westbrook. In the playoffs, the Rockets faced the sixth seeded Oklahoma City Thunder in a battle of the MVP frontrunners, as the winner was not announced until after the finals. The Rockets won the series 4–1 including Nene Hilario's perfect 12–12 in field goals in Game 4. But they went on to lose to the San Antonio Spurs in a six-game series, despite blowing out the Spurs in game 1 by 27 points. The Spurs tied the series 2–2 and held on to win game 5 as Manu Ginobili blocked James Harden's game tying three point attempt as time ran out, and went on to win game 6 by 39 points, as Spurs player LaMarcus Aldridge scored 34 points and grabbed 12 rebounds.

On June 28, 2017, 8 time All-NBA player and 9 time All-Star Chris Paul was acquired in a trade from the Los Angeles Clippers, in exchange for Sam Dekker, Patrick Beverley, Lou Williams, DeAndre Liggins, Darrun Hilliard, Kyle Wiltjer, Montrezl Harrell, cash considerations, and a top three protected 2018 first round draft pick. It was reported on 5 September 2017, that Houston restaurant billionaire Tilman Fertitta had reached an agreement with Rockets owner Leslie Alexander to purchase the team, pending league approval. The $2.2 billion sale price breaks the record for the price to purchase an American professional sports team, breaking the $2 billion record jointly held by the sale prices of the Los Angeles Dodgers in 2012 and the Los Angeles Clippers in 2014. The sale was closed on October 5.

The Rockets went on a 17-game winning streak, which was the second-longest winning streak in the team's history and pushed them to the top of the Western Conference. The streak started with a 113–102 victory over the Phoenix Suns on January 30, 2018, and ended on March 9 to the Eastern Conference-leading Toronto Raptors with a 108–105 loss. The team finished the season with 65 wins, a record both league-leading and the best in franchise history. During the playoffs, Houston easily beat the Minnesota Timberwolves and Utah Jazz before another confrontation with the Golden State Warriors. In game 5 of the Conference Finals, the Rockets took a 3–2 lead in the series, but saw Paul leave with an injured hamstring. His absence was felt in the two remaining games, where Houston led by halftime only to suffer a comeback by the Warriors.

=== 2019–2020: Harden and Westbrook duo ===
During the 2019 off-season, the Rockets sought out to once again retool the roster. As part of a trade with the Oklahoma City Thunder, the Rockets traded Chris Paul, two future first-round picks, and two future first-round pick swaps in exchange for James Harden's former Thunder teammate Russell Westbrook. Nearing the trade deadline of the 2019–20 season, the Rockets were involved in a blockbuster, three-team trade which was centered around bringing Robert Covington back to the Rockets and sending centers Clint Capela and Nenê to the Atlanta Hawks. The trade was in an effort to fully invest on a small ball, 5-out offense. In their first 12 games since going 6'7" or shorter in their lineups, the Rockets went 10–2, being in the top percentile in win percentage, offensive rating, and point differential. In February, the month they made the trade, the MVP backcourt of Westbrook and Harden became the first teammates in NBA history to average 30+ points and 5+ assists per game.

=== 2020–2021: Harden's final years ===
During the off-season, Mike D'Antoni and Daryl Morey left the team. In December, Russell Westbrook was traded to the Washington Wizards for John Wall. Under new head coach Stephen Silas, James Harden reportedly arrived to training camp late. On January 14, 2021, the James Harden era in Houston ended as Harden was traded to the Brooklyn Nets in a four-team deal involving the Indiana Pacers and Cleveland Cavaliers. In March 2021, the Rockets announced that they will retire Harden's No. 13 when he retires.

With Harden gone, the Rockets quickly fell apart. The best player they got back in the deal, Victor Oladipo, only played 20 games with the Rockets before getting traded to Miami. John Wall, coming back from injury, was inefficient. Longtime Rocket P.J. Tucker asked for a trade and was traded to the Milwaukee Bucks. Around that time, they lost 20 straight games from early February to mid March, the longest losing streak in Rockets history. They were forced to play a league-record 30 players through the season. At the end of it all, they finished with a 17–55 record, the worst in the league, one year after making the playoffs.

== 2021–present: Alperen Şengün era ==
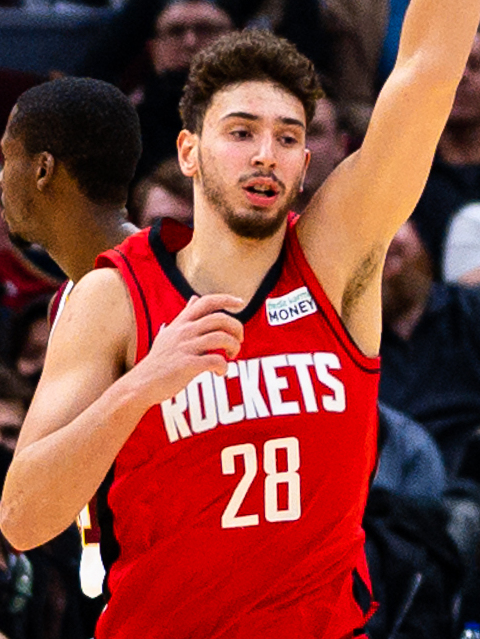
Alperen Şengün was drafted 16th overall in 2021.

In the 2021 NBA draft, the team selected Jalen Green with the second overall pick out of the NBA G League Ignite, pairing him alongside Kevin Porter Jr., who was acquired via trade the season prior for a top-55 protected second-round pick. Because of their additions in the draft, including first round selections of Alperen Şengün and Josh Christopher, the team began focusing on developing and rebuilding around their young core, which resulted in John Wall being benched for the entire season. In the 2021–22 season, the Rockets were once again at the bottom of the league, with a 20–62 record. Jalen Green was selected to the NBA All-Rookie First Team with averages of 17.3 points, 3.4 rebounds, and 2.6 assists.

In the 2022 NBA draft, the Rockets selected Jabari Smith Jr. with third overall pick and Tari Eason with the 17th overall picks. The Rockets made some adjustments by sending forward Christian Wood to the Dallas Mavericks in an exchange for Boban Marjanović, Sterling Brown, Trey Burke and Marquese Chriss and traded all of them to the Oklahoma City Thunder during the off-season to develop their young core while keeping Marjanović. The Rockets bought out John Wall's contract, who had been demanding a trade for a while and did not participate in the Rockets' 2021–22 season.

On February 9, 2023, the Rockets traded long-time veteran Eric Gordon to the Clippers in a three-team trade, receiving Danny Green and John Wall in return. The Rockets ended the 2022–23 regular season with a 22–60 record, tying with the San Antonio Spurs for last in the Western Conference. The Rockets fired head coach Stephen Silas after they chose not to pick up his fourth year option and replaced him with former Boston Celtics head coach Ime Udoka.

One-time All-Star Fred VanVleet joined the Rockets via free agency signing a three-year, $130 million contract. The next day, former Memphis Grizzlies forward Dillon Brooks joined the team signing a four-year, $86 million contract after a first-round exit against the Los Angeles Lakers. The Rockets selected Amen Thompson with the fourth pick and Cam Whitmore with the 20th pick in the 2023 NBA draft. Şengün improved this season, averaging 21.1 points per game, 9.3 rebounds per game, and 5 assists per game. He was announced out for the season on March 21 with an ankle injury.

The Houston Rockets selected Kentucky guard Reed Sheppard with the third overall pick in the 2024 NBA draft. Building on momentum from last year, they had a breakout season, finishing 52–30 and securing the second seed in the Western Conference. Şengün made his first All-Star Game appearance this season. The Rockets made their first playoff appearance in five years, ultimately falling to the Golden State Warriors in a seven-game first-round series.

=== 2025–present: Arrival of Kevin Durant ===
On July 6, 2025, the Rockets traded Jalen Green and Dillon Brooks to the Phoenix Suns in a seven-team trade in exchange for perennial All-Star Kevin Durant. They finished with a 52–30 record, earning the fourth seed in the Western Conference. They lost to the Los Angeles Lakers in six games.
