= 1967 NBA Finals =

1967 basketball championship series

Team	Coach	Wins
Philadelphia 76ers	Alex Hannum	4
San Francisco Warriors	Bill Sharman	2
- Dates: April 14–24
- Hall of Famers: 76ers: Wilt Chamberlain (1979); Larry Costello (2022, contributor); Billy Cunningham (1986); Hal Greer (1982); Chet Walker (2012); Warriors: Rick Barry (1987); Nate Thurmond (1985); Coaches: Bill Sharman (2004); Alex Hannum (1998); Officials: Mendy Rudolph (2007); Earl Strom (1995)
- Eastern finals: 76ers defeated Celtics, 4–1
- Western finals: Warriors defeated Hawks, 4–2

The 1967 NBA World Championship Series was the championship series of the 1966–67 National Basketball Association (NBA) season, and it was the conclusion of the 1967 NBA playoffs. The best-of-seven series was played between the Western Division champion San Francisco Warriors and the Eastern Division champion Philadelphia 76ers. This was the first championship series in 11 years without the Boston Celtics, who were defeated in the Division Finals by Philadelphia, the first time since 1958 and the only time in the 1960s that the Boston Celtics did not win the NBA Finals. It matched two teams who had each relocated in the decade, as the Warriors had moved from Philadelphia to San Francisco in 1962 and the 76ers had been relocated from Syracuse to replace the void left by the Warriors. Wilt Chamberlain had been the star of the Warriors since joining the team in 1959 (which included an MVP Award) but was traded to the 76ers in the middle of the 1965 season.

Under first-year head coach Alex Hannum (who had been fired by the Warriors the previous season) and an approach to have Chamberlain focus more on defense rather than scoring (which resulted in a shooting percentage of 68.3%), Philadelphia dominated the regular season with a 68–13 record, the most regular season wins in NBA history at the time as Chamberlain won his third MVP award. While they did win in six games, it was a tight affair that saw numerous records set (most notably by Rick Barry, who scored the second most number of points by a player in a Finals at the time) as Game 1 required overtime and the decisive Game 6 saw the 76ers rally back from a six-point deficit in the fourth quarter to win the championship. With the win, Alex Hannum (who had led the St. Louis Hawks to the NBA title in 1958) became the first coach to win a championship with two different franchises, a mark that has since been matched by just two other head coaches in NBA history.

== Series summary ==
Game	Date	Home team	Result	Road team
Game 1	April 14	Philadelphia 76ers	141–135* (1–0)	San Francisco Warriors
Game 2	April 16	Philadelphia 76ers	126–95 (2–0)	San Francisco Warriors
Game 3	April 18	San Francisco Warriors	130–124 (1–2)	Philadelphia 76ers
Game 4	April 20	San Francisco Warriors	108–122 (1–3)	Philadelphia 76ers
Game 5	April 23	Philadelphia 76ers	109–117 (3-2)	San Francisco Warriors
Game 6	April 24	San Francisco Warriors	122–125 (2–4)	Philadelphia 76ers

76ers win series 4–2
* denotes overtime

== Team rosters ==
=== Philadelphia 76ers ===
1966–67 Philadelphia 76ers roster
Players

Pos.	No.	Player	Height	Weight	DOB	From
C	13	Wilt Chamberlain	7 ft 1 in (2.16 m)	275 lb (125 kg)	1936-08-21	Kansas
PG	21	Larry Costello	6 ft 1 in (1.85 m)	186 lb (84 kg)	1931-07-02	Niagara
F	32	Billy Cunningham	6 ft 6 in (1.98 m)	210 lb (95 kg)	1943-06-03	North Carolina
F	20	Dave Gambee	6 ft 6 in (1.98 m)	215 lb (98 kg)	1937-04-16	Oregon State
G	15	Hal Greer	6 ft 2 in (1.88 m)	175 lb (79 kg)	1936-06-26	Marshall
SG	14	Matt Guokas	6 ft 5 in (1.96 m)	175 lb (79 kg)	1944-02-25	Saint Joseph's
F	54	Luke Jackson	6 ft 9 in (2.06 m)	240 lb (109 kg)	1941-10-31	Texas–Pan American
G	24	Wali Jones	6 ft 2 in (1.88 m)	180 lb (82 kg)	1942-02-14	Villanova
PG	28	Bill Melchionni	6 ft 1 in (1.85 m)	165 lb (75 kg)	1944-10-19	Villanova
F	25	Chet Walker	6 ft 6 in (1.98 m)	212 lb (96 kg)	1940-02-22	Bradley
G	12	Bob Weiss	6 ft 2 in (1.88 m)	180 lb (82 kg)	1942-05-07	Penn State

Coaches
Head coach
- Alex Hannum

Legend
- (DP) Unsigned draft pick
- (FA) Free agent
- (S) Suspended
- Injured

Roster

=== San Francisco Warriors ===
1966–67 San Francisco Warriors roster
Players

Pos.	No.	Player	Height	Weight	DOB	From
F	24	(United States)	Rick Barry	6 ft 7 in (2.01 m)	205 lb (93 kg)		Miami
G	16	(United States)	Al Attles	6 ft 0 in (1.83 m)	175 lb (79 kg)		North Carolina A&T
F	31	(United States)	Joe Ellis	6 ft 6 in (1.98 m)	175 lb (79 kg)		San Francisco
F	44	(United States)	Fred Hetzel	6 ft 8 in (2.03 m)	220 lb (100 kg)		Davidson
G	21	(United States)	Jim King	6 ft 2 in (1.88 m)	175 lb (79 kg)		Tulsa
F	35	(United States)	Rudy LaRusso	6 ft 7 in (2.01 m)	220 lb (100 kg)		Dartmouth
F	47	(United States)	Dave Lattin	6 ft 6 in (1.98 m)	225 lb (102 kg)		UTEP
F/C	43	(United States)	Clyde Lee	6 ft 10 in (2.08 m)	205 lb (93 kg)		Vanderbilt
G/F	9	(United States)	George Lee	6 ft 4 in (1.93 m)	200 lb (91 kg)		Michigan
G	23	(United States)	Jeff Mullins	6 ft 4 in (1.93 m)	190 lb (86 kg)		Duke
F/C	42	(United States)	Nate Thurmond	6 ft 11 in (2.11 m)	225 lb (102 kg)		Bowling Green

Coaches
Head coach
- (United States) Bill Sharman (USC)
Assistant(s)
- (United States) George Lee (Michigan)

Legend
- (DP) Unsigned draft pick
- (FA) Free agent
- (S) Suspended
- Injured

== Game summaries ==
=== Game 1 ===
April 14

Recap

San Francisco Warriors 135, Philadelphia 76ers 141 (OT)
Scoring by quarter: 30–43, 35–30, 28–34, 35–21, Overtime: 7–13
Pts: Rick Barry 37; Rebs: Nate Thurmond 31; Asts: Rick Barry 7	Pts: Hal Greer 32; Rebs: Wilt Chamberlain 33; Asts: Wilt Chamberlain 10
Philadelphia leads the series, 1–0

Convention Hall, Philadelphia, Pennsylvania
Referees: Earl Strom, Richie Powers

This game holds the record for most combined points in a Finals game, at 276.

=== Game 2 ===
April 16

Recap

San Francisco Warriors 95, Philadelphia 76ers 126
Scoring by quarter: 17–26, 29–31, 23–28, 26–41
Pts: Rick Barry 30; Rebs: Nate Thurmond 29; Asts: Jim King 6	Pts: Hal Greer 30; Rebs: Wilt Chamberlain 38; Asts: Wilt Chamberlain 10
Philadelphia leads, 2–0

Convention Hall, Philadelphia, Pennsylvania
Referees: Norm Drucker, Mendy Rudolph

Wilt Chamberlain set a record for rebounds in a half with 26 in the first half.

=== Game 3 ===
April 18

Recap

Philadelphia 76ers 124, San Francisco Warriors 130
Scoring by quarter: 35–32, 28–37, 29–29, 32–32
Pts: Hal Greer 26; Rebs: Wilt Chamberlain 26; Asts: Wali Jones 7	Pts: Rick Barry 55; Rebs: Nate Thurmond 25; Asts: Jim King 6
Philadelphia leads the series, 2–1

Cow Palace, Daly City, California
Referees: Earl Strom, John Vanak

Scoring a postseason career-high 55 points on 48 attempts, Rick Barry tied the record set by Wilt Chamberlain in the 1962 playoffs for field goal attempts in one postseason game.

=== Game 4 ===
April 20

Recap

Philadelphia 76ers 122, San Francisco Warriors 108
Scoring by quarter: 34–27, 26–22, 31–29, 31–30
Pts: Hal Greer 38; Rebs: Wilt Chamberlain 27; Asts: Wilt Chamberlain 8	Pts: Rick Barry 43; Rebs: Nate Thurmond 25; Asts: Nate Thurmond 5
Philadelphia leads, 3–1

Cow Palace, Daly City, California
Referees: Mendy Rudolph, Joe Gushue

=== Game 5 ===
April 23

Recap

San Francisco Warriors 117, Philadelphia 76ers 109
Scoring by quarter: 31–32, 30–32, 23–32, 33–13
Pts: Rick Barry 36; Rebs: Nate Thurmond 28; Asts: Al Attles 6	Pts: Chet Walker 25; Rebs: Wilt Chamberlain 24; Asts: Hal Greer 7
Philadelphia leads the series, 3–2

Convention Hall, Philadelphia, Pennsylvania
Referees: Mendy Rudolph, Norm Drucker

=== Game 6 ===
April 24

Recap

Philadelphia 76ers 125, San Francisco Warriors 122
Scoring by quarter: 43–41, 25–31, 28–30, 29–20
Pts: Wali Jones 27; Rebs: Wilt Chamberlain 23; Asts: Hal Greer 7	Pts: Rick Barry 44; Rebs: Nate Thurmond 22; Asts: Jim King 7
Philadelphia wins the NBA Finals, 4–2

Cow Palace, Daly City, California
Referees: Earl Strom, John Vanak

The two teams combined for 84 points in the first quarter, which set a new postseason record. It was matched in the 1994 playoffs and 2003 but has not been surpassed. The 76ers were trailing 106-102 early in the fourth quarter before Matt Guokas, a bench player for a majority of the season, took a quick pass off a rebound to throw in a 20-foot shot and quickly getting the ball again on a break and taking on Nate Thurmond when driving to the rim for a layup that tied the game along with knocking him out of the game when he crashed into the basket support. Chamberlain later exclaimed, "Gook! Gook! The rook showed us how!" In the final quarter, Chamberlain recorded eight rebounds and six blocks. The Warriors were trailing 123–122 with under 20 seconds remaining. An attempted pick and roll by Barry and Thurmond against Chamberlain saw a defensive struggle as Barry could not get a clean shot off when Chamberlain shifted his focus to Thurmond on an attempted pass, and a jump ball was forced on the rebound. Philadelphia scored a two-point shot to close out the scoring.

== See also ==
- 1967 NBA playoffs
- 1966–67 NBA season
