= 1969 NBA Finals =

1969 basketball championship series

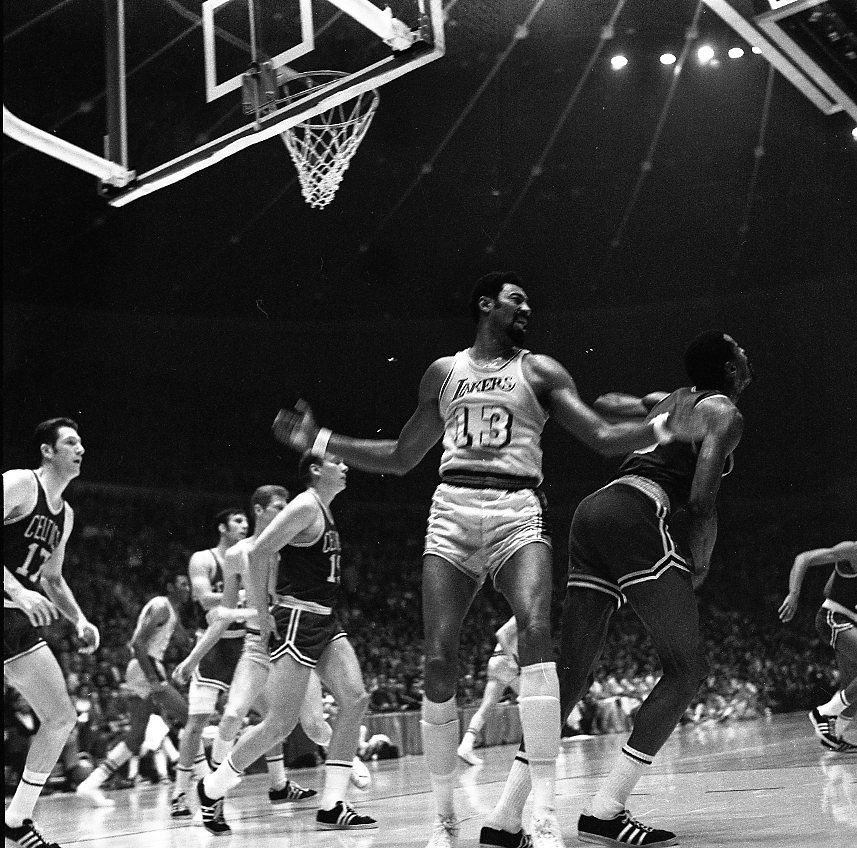
Team	Coach	Wins
Boston Celtics	Bill Russell (player-coach)	4
Los Angeles Lakers	Butch van Breda Kolff	3
- Dates: April 23–May 5
- MVP: Jerry West (Los Angeles Lakers)
- Hall of Famers: Celtics: John Havlicek (1984); Bailey Howell (1997); Sam Jones (1984); Don Nelson (2012, coach); Bill Russell (1975); Satch Sanders (2011, contributor); Lakers: Elgin Baylor (1977); Wilt Chamberlain (1979); Jerry West (1980); Coaches: Bill Russell (2021); Officials: Mendy Rudolph (2007); Earl Strom (1995)
- Eastern finals: Celtics defeated Knicks, 4–2
- Western finals: Lakers defeated Hawks, 4–1

The 1969 NBA World Championship Series to determine the champion of the 1968–69 NBA season was played between the Los Angeles Lakers and Boston Celtics. The Lakers were heavily favored due to the presence of three formidable stars: Elgin Baylor, Wilt Chamberlain, and Jerry West. In addition, Boston was an aging team; they made the playoffs as the fourth place team in the Eastern Division, and were not favored to make it to the finals; no four seed had ever made the Finals before the Celtics did so here. Ultimately, the Celtics won the championship in seven games – the last championship of the Bill Russell dynasty – and is considered one of the great upsets in NBA history. The Celtics became the first team in NBA history to overcome a 2–0 series deficit to win the championship. They remain the only 4th seed team to win the Finals and the second-lowest seeded team overall to win the Finals after the Houston Rockets in 1995.

This series is also notable in that West, with an average of nearly 38 points a game, won the Finals Most Valuable Player award, despite being on the losing team. This was the first year a Finals MVP award was given, and it remains the only time in NBA Finals history that the MVP was awarded to a player on the losing team. It also marked the first time in NBA Finals history that a Game 7 was won by the road team.

== Context ==
The Los Angeles Lakers had won 55 games in the regular season (2nd best to the Baltimore Bullets' 57 wins), seven more than their perennial rivals, the Boston Celtics, and therefore held homecourt advantage for the first time ever in an NBA Finals meeting vs. the Russell-led Celtics. Both teams had their share of problems in the regular season. Though the Lakers's acquisition of star center Wilt Chamberlain before the season prompted many observers to predict for them the title that had previously eluded them, their arrival at the Finals had not been easy; the season could have been described as a "soap opera"; Chamberlain and reigning Laker superstars Elgin Baylor and Jerry West had some difficulty in meshing their accustomed styles. Second-year coach Butch van Breda Kolff and Chamberlain also clashed terribly throughout the season, frustrating the entire team. In Boston, player-coach Bill Russell was suffering from age and exhaustion, hampering the team both as the starting center and as the coach. In addition, perennial scorer Sam Jones played so poorly that he lost his position as starting shooting guard to Larry Siegfried. The Lakers’ appearance in the Finals was expected, but they lost the first two games of the Western Division semifinals to the San Francisco Warriors on their home court before prevailing, and then outlasted the Atlanta Hawks 4 games to 1 to gain the rematch with the Celtics. Boston's campaign was considered a surprise. They upset the 2nd place 76ers and were fortunate that the 3rd place Knicks upset the 1st place Bullets; Boston then knocked off New York in the Eastern Division finals. In that series, the home team won all of its games, except for Game 7.

On the hardwood, there were several key matchups. At center, low scoring, defensive stalwart Celtics center Bill Russell was matched up against his long-time rival and friend Wilt Chamberlain (Lakers), multiple time scoring champion. At forward, agile Celtic Bailey Howell played against perennial All-NBA member Elgin Baylor, captain of the Lakers, while Laker Keith Erickson tried to slow down high-scoring Celtics forward John Havlicek. At guard, a somewhat revitalised Sam Jones was matched up against Lakers superstar Jerry West. X-factors on both teams respectively were Don Nelson, the sixth man of the Celtics, and sharpshooting Laker Johnny Egan, the only other pure guard besides West on the L.A. roster.

== Team rosters ==
=== Boston Celtics ===
1968–69 Boston Celtics roster
Players

Pos.	No.	Player	Height	Weight	DOB	From
C	28	Jim Barnes	6 ft 8 in (2.03 m)	210 lb (95 kg)		UTEP
PG	7	Em Bryant	6 ft 1 in (1.85 m)	175 lb (79 kg)		DePaul
SG	12	Don Chaney	6 ft 5 in (1.96 m)	210 lb (95 kg)		Houston
PG	11	Mal Graham	6 ft 1 in (1.85 m)	185 lb (84 kg)		NYU
G/F	17	John Havlicek	6 ft 5 in (1.96 m)	203 lb (92 kg)		Ohio State
SF	18	Bailey Howell	6 ft 7 in (2.01 m)	210 lb (95 kg)		Mississippi State
C	26	Rich Johnson	6 ft 7 in (2.01 m)	210 lb (95 kg)		Grambling State
SG	24	Sam Jones	6 ft 4 in (1.93 m)	198 lb (90 kg)		North Carolina Central
F	19	Don Nelson	6 ft 6 in (1.98 m)	210 lb (95 kg)		Iowa
PF	29	Bud Olsen	6 ft 8 in (2.03 m)	220 lb (100 kg)		Louisville
C	6	Bill Russell	6 ft 9 in (2.06 m)	215 lb (98 kg)		San Francisco
SF	16	Satch Sanders	6 ft 6 in (1.98 m)	210 lb (95 kg)		NYU
G	20	Larry Siegfried	6 ft 3 in (1.91 m)	190 lb (86 kg)		Ohio State

Coaches
Head coach
- Bill Russell

Legend
- (DP) Unsigned draft pick
- (FA) Free agent
- (S) Suspended
- Injured

=== Los Angeles Lakers ===
1968–69 Los Angeles Lakers roster
Players

Pos.	No.	Player	Height	Weight	DOB	From
SG	30	Cliff Anderson	6 ft 2 in (1.88 m)	200 lb (91 kg)	1944-09-07	Saint Joseph's
SF	22	Elgin Baylor	6 ft 5 in (1.96 m)	225 lb (102 kg)	1934-09-16	Seattle
PF	52	Jay Carty	6 ft 8 in (2.03 m)	220 lb (100 kg)	1941-07-04	Oregon State
C	13	Wilt Chamberlain	7 ft 1 in (2.16 m)	275 lb (125 kg)	1936-08-21	Kansas
PF	31	Mel Counts	7 ft 0 in (2.13 m)	230 lb (104 kg)	1941-10-16	Oregon State
SG	12	Freddie Crawford	6 ft 4 in (1.93 m)	189 lb (86 kg)	1941-12-33	St. Bonaventure
PG	21	Johnny Egan	5 ft 11 in (1.80 m)	180 lb (82 kg)	1939-01-31	Providence
SG	24	Keith Erickson	6 ft 5 in (1.96 m)	195 lb (88 kg)	1944-04-19	UCLA
SF	33	Tom Hawkins	6 ft 5 in (1.96 m)	210 lb (95 kg)	1936-12-22	Notre Dame
PF	30	Bill Hewitt	6 ft 7 in (2.01 m)	210 lb (95 kg)	1944-08-08	USC
PG	44	Jerry West	6 ft 3 in (1.91 m)	175 lb (79 kg)	1938-05-28	West Virginia

Coaches
Head coach
- Butch van Breda Kolff

Legend
- (DP) Unsigned draft pick
- (FA) Free agent
- (S) Suspended
- Injured

== Series summary ==
Game	Date	Home team	Result	Road team
Game 1	April 23	Los Angeles Lakers	120–118 (1–0)	Boston Celtics
Game 2	April 25	Los Angeles Lakers	118–112 (2–0)	Boston Celtics
Game 3	April 27	Boston Celtics	111–105 (1–2)	Los Angeles Lakers
Game 4	April 29	Boston Celtics	89–88 (2–2)	Los Angeles Lakers
Game 5	May 1	Los Angeles Lakers	117–104 (3–2)	Boston Celtics
Game 6	May 3	Boston Celtics	99–90 (3–3)	Los Angeles Lakers
Game 7	May 5	Los Angeles Lakers	106–108 (3–4)	Boston Celtics

Celtics win the series 4–3

== Game summaries ==
=== Game 1 ===
April 23

Boxscore

Boston Celtics 118, Los Angeles Lakers 120
Scoring by quarter: 32–33, 26–23, 26–26, 34–38
Pts: John Havlicek 37; Rebs: Bill Russell 27; Asts: Sam Jones 6	Pts: Jerry West 53; Rebs: Wilt Chamberlain 23; Asts: Jerry West 10
Los Angeles leads series, 1–0

The Forum, Inglewood, California
Attendance: 17,554
Referees: Norm Drucker, Earl Strom

Prior to the series, Celtics player-coach Bill Russell decided not to double-team Lakers star guard Jerry West. West was initially complaining of exhaustion, but in the game, all was forgotten. He used this freedom to score 53 points on opposing guards Sam Jones and Larry Siegfried. In an action-packed match, the lead changed 21 times, and it was Lakers center Wilt Chamberlain who sealed the game with a clutch basket 23 seconds before the end.

=== Game 2 ===
April 25

Boxscore

Boston Celtics 112, Los Angeles Lakers 118
Scoring by quarter: 25–24, 30–29, 30–35, 27–30
Pts: John Havlicek 43; Rebs: Bill Russell 21; Asts: Bill Russell 13	Pts: Jerry West 41; Rebs: Wilt Chamberlain 19; Asts: Egan, West 8 each
Los Angeles leads series, 2–0

The Forum, Inglewood, California
Attendance: 17,559
Referees: Mendy Rudolph, John Vanak

Again, Russell declined to double-team West. In a tough, physical match, West continued his scoring dominance by scoring 41 points. Aided also by guard Johnny Egan, who scored 26 points, and 31 points from Elgin Baylor (among them the last 12 Lakers points), the Lakers won. Celtics forward Don Nelson and Lakers forward Bill Hewitt required a half-dozen stitches each after in-game collisions.

=== Game 3 ===
April 27

Boxscore

Los Angeles Lakers 105, Boston Celtics 111
Scoring by quarter: 16–25, 24–32, 38–21, 27–33
Pts: Jerry West 24; Rebs: Wilt Chamberlain 26; Asts: Jerry West 6	Pts: John Havlicek 34; Rebs: Bill Russell 18; Asts: John Havlicek 7
Los Angeles leads series, 2–1

Boston Garden, Boston, Massachusetts
Attendance: 14,037
Referees: Earl Strom, Norm Drucker

In Game 3, Russell finally decided to double-team West. With the heightened pressure, West lost his shooting touch. Also, the exhaustion he was complaining about prior to the series became so apparent that he asked to be taken out for longer stretches. In both pauses, the Lakers fell back by double digits. The heroics belonged to Celtics forward John Havlicek: playing with a swollen eye after being poked by Keith Erickson, he scored 34 points.

=== Game 4 ===
April 29

Boxscore

Los Angeles Lakers 88, Boston Celtics 89
Scoring by quarter: 15–16, 26–33, 29–18, 18–22
Pts: Jerry West 40; Rebs: Wilt Chamberlain 31; Asts: Baylor, West 4 each	Pts: John Havlicek 21; Rebs: Bill Russell 29; Asts: 5 players 2 each (Note: Bryant, Havlicek, Howell, Russell, Siegfried)
Series tied, 2–2

Boston Garden, Boston, Massachusetts
Attendance: 15,128
Referees: Mendy Rudolph, Joe Gushue

Game 4 was an ugly affair, filled with 50 turnovers and low shooting percentages, but was the turning point in the series. The Lakers had a one-point lead with 7 seconds left and the ball. However, after receiving an inbound pass along the sideline, Baylor was controversially ruled to have stepped out of bounds, causing a turnover. For the last play, Celtics players Havlicek, Siegfried, Bailey Howell and Jones executed a so-called "Ohio", with the three former Ohio State Buckeye players setting a triple pick for the latter. Jones jumped off the wrong foot, but the ball avoided the block attempt of Lakers center Chamberlain, hit the front rim, bounced on the back rim and somehow dropped in for the series-equalizing buzzer beater. So instead of the Lakers going home with a 3–1 series lead, it was all even at 2 games apiece.

=== Game 5 ===
May 1

Boxscore

Boston Celtics 104, Los Angeles Lakers 117
Scoring by quarter: 24–23, 21–26, 24–30, 35–38
Pts: Sam Jones 25; Rebs: John Havlicek 14; Asts: Havlicek, Russell 5	Pts: Jerry West 39; Rebs: Wilt Chamberlain 31; Asts: Jerry West 9
Los Angeles leads series, 3–2

The Forum, Inglewood, California
Attendance: 17,553
Referees: Norm Drucker, Joe Gushue

Enraged by the unlucky Game 4 loss, the Lakers overran the Celtics with high-power basketball. Wilt Chamberlain played through a swollen eye after Celtics guard Em Bryant had poked him. With just three minutes remaining and the Lakers safely ahead, Bryant stole the ball from West. Instead of letting Bryant run, he lunged for the ball, pulled his hamstring and had to be carried out of the game. It was immediately evident that West's swollen leg would not heal until the end of the series.

=== Game 6 ===
May 3

Boxscore

Los Angeles Lakers 90, Boston Celtics 99
Scoring by quarter: 22–32, 17–23, 26–27, 25–17
Pts: Baylor, West 26 each Rebs: Wilt Chamberlain 18; Asts: Wilt Chamberlain 4	Pts: Don Nelson 25; Rebs: Bill Russell 19; Asts: Em Bryant 5
Series tied, 3–3

Boston Garden, Boston, Massachusetts
Attendance: 15,128
Referees: Mendy Rudolph, Earl Strom

In another ugly game, the Celtics were up 55–39 at halftime and never looked back. The Celtics at one point went 6-of-27 from the field, but the Lakers could not make use of this slump. With neither Baylor nor the limping West providing consistent scoring, Boston cruised to an easy victory. This game was also one of Chamberlain's lesser games: with Russell hounding him, the multiple scoring champion scored only 8 points, provoking criticism that he had choked when it counted most.

=== Game 7 ===
May 5

Boxscore

Boston Celtics 108, Los Angeles Lakers 106
Scoring by quarter: 28–25, 31–31, 32–20, 17–30
Pts: John Havlicek 26; Rebs: Bill Russell 21; Asts: Bill Russell 6	Pts: Jerry West 42; Rebs: Wilt Chamberlain 27; Asts: Jerry West 12
Boston wins NBA Finals, 4–3

The Forum, Inglewood, California
Attendance: 17,568
Referees: Mendy Rudolph, Earl Strom

In anticipation of a Lakers win, Lakers owner Jack Kent Cooke had ordered thousands of balloons with "World Champion Lakers" printed on them suspended from the rafters of the Forum. Flyers were placed in every seat stating, "When, not if, the Lakers win the title, balloons will be released from the rafters, the USC marching band will play "Happy Days Are Here Again" and broadcaster Chick Hearn will interview Elgin Baylor, Jerry West and Wilt Chamberlain in that order." Before the game, the Celtics circulated in their locker room a memo about the Lakers' celebration plans. When Jerry West went to the court for a pre game shoot around and saw the balloons, he became furious with Cooke. Russell noted the giant net hanging from the ceiling during pregame warmups and said to West, "Those fucking balloons are staying up there." With only two true guards on the Laker roster and West still feeling the effects of the hamstring pull, Celtics coach Russell ordered his players to fast break at every opportunity.

Los Angeles shot poorly in the early going, and the Celtics jumped out to a first-quarter 24–12 lead which was cut to 59–56 at halftime. Then, Celtics sixth man Don Nelson scored 12 points in the third quarter, while the Lakers hardly connected on a quarter of their field goal attempts: the Celtics led 91–76 after the third. Early in the fourth quarter, Chamberlain incurred his fifth foul (he had never fouled out of a game in his career) and had to play more tentative defense. Then, with just over 5 minutes remaining and the Lakers trailing 103–94, Chamberlain landed awkwardly when grabbing a rebound and came to the bench with an injured knee. Behind backup center Mel Counts, the Lakers cut the lead to 103–102 with two minutes left. Chamberlain then informed Van Breda Kolff that he was ready to return, but the coach told the superstar center "we're doing fine without you", and Chamberlain stayed on the bench. Boston still held the 103–102 lead with 1:33 left in the game when reserve guard Keith Erickson knocked the ball away from John Havlicek. The ball went right to Don Nelson, who put up a desperation 18 foot shot from the free throw line to beat the 24 second clock; the ball hit the back rim, bounced high in the air and fell through the hoop to give Boston a 105–102 lead. The Lakers committed costly turnovers in the last moments and trailed 108–104 before making a meaningless last second shot that made the final score 108–106.

The Celtics became the first team in NBA Finals history to overcome a 2–0 series deficit to win the championship. They would later be joined by the Portland Trail Blazers in 1977, the Miami Heat in 2006, the Cleveland Cavaliers in 2016 (also the first team to overcome a 3-1 series deficit) and the Milwaukee Bucks in 2021.

== See also ==
- 1969 NBA playoffs
- 1968–69 NBA season
