= Joe Gushue =

American basketball referee

- Born: Joseph J. Gushue; October 7, 1932; Philadelphia, Pennsylvania
- Died: November 12, 1996 (aged 64); Philadelphia, Pennsylvania
- Employer(s): National Basketball Association (1961 to 1969, 1974 to 1984); American Basketball Association (1969 to 1974)
- Title: Basketball Referee

Joseph J. Gushue was a professional basketball referee in the American Basketball Association (ABA) and the National Basketball Association (NBA). He was chosen to referee in NBA All-Star Games and ABA All-Star Games, ABA championship finals series, NBA championship finals series, in addition to over 20 years of regular season work as an official. He was one of four lead NBA referees who left the NBA to join the ABA in 1969. This move resulted in dramatically increased salaries for referees. He rejoined the NBA in 1974, before the ABA ceased operations as a separate entity. Gushue was considered not only one of the best officials of his era, but also an exceptional teacher of young referees.

== Early life ==
Gushue was born on October 7, 1932, in Philadelphia, to George Francis and Elizabeth Louise (Keating) Gushue. He was raised in Port Richmond, Philadelphia and attended Northeast Catholic High School. He got started with basketball officiating through Kensington, Philadelphia native Andy Hershock, who later died while officiating an ABA game in January 1971.

Gushue worked as a carpenter, and refereed community basketball games. Sid Borgia was one of the NBA's original referees, and by 1961 he was the NBA's supervisor of officials (as well as a game official). That year, Borgia was on vacation in Wildwood, New Jersey when he observed Gushue officiating a summer basketball league game. Gushue and Borgia would soon be working together as referees in the NBA.

== Professional career ==
Borgia invited Gushue to try out for the NBA in 1961. There was one opening left for a referee's position, and Gushue reportedly won the position over future Los Angeles Dodgers' manager Tommy Lasorda. In addition to his ultimately unsuccessful career as a pitcher, Lasorda, a native of Norristown, Pennsylvania, had become a referee in the Eastern Professional Basketball League (consisting mostly of teams in Northeast Pennsylvania).

In another telling, Lasorda did not attempt to become an NBA referee until 1963 (two years after Gushue was hired). Lasorda's childhood friend Earl Strom from Pottstown, Pennsylvania, a future Naismith Basketball Hall of Fame referee, recommended Lasorda to Borgia; whom Lasorda had verbally abused years earlier when Borgia was working as a home plate umpire in Minor League Baseball. Borgia assigned Lasorda to referee some 1963 preseason games in the Midwest, and his foul language so upset Cincinnati Royals' coach Charlie Wolf, that Wolf called the NBA league office in New York to have Lasorda removed from calling Royals' games, effectively ending Lasorda's officiating career.

Like Strom, Gushue was one of the many NBA referees to come out of the Philadelphia region, whether by native birth or later-in-life training in Philadelphia. When Celtics' head coach Red Auerbach was told some of the referees he pejoratively said were from "Philly" were actually from New Jersey or Western Pennsylvania, he replied "That doesn't matter. They went through Philadelphia". These "Philadelphia" referees shared the common trait of officiating a game in a way that they controlled the game, and the game did not control them.

Gushue's professional career (1961 to 1984) encompassed arguably the NBA's most difficult decade; the 1970s. Among the problems the NBA, ABA and their referees had to face was fist fighting between individual players on court and brawls involving entire teams. Gushue was one of the referees in a notorious 1977 NBA Finals fight between the Portland Trail Blazers and Philadelphia 76ers that changed the outcome of the series.

=== Rookie season ===
Gushue was the only rookie referee who officiated over the course of the entire 1961–62 NBA season. Borgia both observed Gushue as supervisor of officials, and officiated games in tandem with Gushue that season. Gushue was paid $50 per game, and was assigned only two or three games a week as the NBA only had nine teams at the time, with two officials per game; so he was told to keep his job as a carpenter.

On November 9, 1961, less than three weeks into his rookie season, Gushue called a technical foul against future Naismith Basketball Hall of Fame Boston Celtics' guard Bob Cousy, during a game against the Detroit Pistons. Future Hall of Fame Celtics' head coach Red Auerbach reportedly pushed and shoved Gushue in response, and was given a technical foul and ordered to get back to the bench. Auerbach refused to leave the court and continued to harangue Gushue with abusive language. Gushue then ejected Auerbach from the game. Instead of leaving the floor, Auerbach continued to shove and harangue Gushue, until finally exiting (leaving Cousy to coach). It was also reported that Auerbach's conduct for which he was given the original technical foul and later ejected solely involved verbal abuse of Gushue from the bench area. This was just the Celtics' fifth game of the season, being played against the Pistons in Philadelphia, as part of a double header, with the Syracuse Nationals playing the Philadelphia Warriors in the second game of the day.

The next day, NBA Commissioner Maurice Podoloff fined Auerbach $200 over his "gross misconduct", and warned Auerbach that he would be suspended over the next altercation with a referee. In some contrast to the newspaper reports at the time, Auerbach's response was that he would continue to protest referees’ calls if he felt justified. Auerbach said he was merely protecting Cousy; that Gushue had missed the Pistons' rough play against Cousy during the game because Gushue was constantly looking at Auerbach instead of the players; that Cousy was called for a technical foul after finally protesting the Pistons' abuse against him; and that Auerbach himself was called for a technical after merely jumping up from his seat in reaction to Cousy receiving a technical, before Auerbach had even said a word to Gushue. Referee Norm Drucker ejected Auerbach in a game against the Warriors in Boston just three days later, and after speaking with Drucker, Podoloff imposed a three-day suspension on Auerbach.

=== NBA career ===
Gushue spent his first eight seasons as a referee in the NBA (1961–62 to 1968–69). He worked on year-to-year contracts in the NBA. In 1968, Detroit Free Press writer Jack Saylor used Gushue as an example of what it takes to work and succeed as an NBA referee, at a time when the overall quality of officiating was being questioned. Referees travel life was worse than that of players. Gushue, for example, had to work on successive nights in Vancouver, Phoenix and Detroit. More significantly, early in his career Gushue was hesitant and unsure as a referee and suffered considerable abuse from the league's coaches; but he endured, outlasted many of those coaches, and over time developed his skill and confidence so much that he "nailed down a ranking as one of the loop's finest, most-respected referees".

In the 1968–69 season, he often partnered with Ken Hudson, the only African American referee in the NBA. Gushue, along with referees Norm Drucker and John Vanak, mentored Hudson, and were both helpful to him and protective of him.

=== ABA career ===
In 1969, when the upstart American Basketball Association was raiding the NBA for talented players, Gushue, along with three other top NBA "lead" referees—John Vanak, Earl Strom, and Norm Drucker—jumped to the ABA with multi-year contracts paying much higher salaries (three years for $300,000) than NBA officials received ($8,000 per year at best). Their changing leagues was called as debilitating to the NBA as any raid on a player.

NBA Commissioner Walter Kennedy said the NBA would have offered the four referees five-year contracts if given the opportunity. The four referees said they had in fact met with Kennedy before deciding to join the ABA, and told him and head NBA referee Mendy Rudolph about the ABA's offer. Vanak later said the NBA asked for a few days to respond, but after not hearing for eight days, the four joined the ABA. Kennedy denied that any meeting with the four occurred. It has also been reported that Lou Moser was another NBA referee joining the ABA for the higher salary the new league offered. As a result of their move to the ABA, professional officiating salaries in the NBA dramatically increased.

Gushue and Vanak officiated an interleague All-Star game between ABA and NBA players in the early 1970s. Gushue refereed the 1973 ABA Finals between the Kentucky Colonels and Indiana Pacers, including Game 7 in Kentucky with Vanak where a hobbled Gus Johnson entered the game after Indiana center Mel Daniels got in foul trouble, and led Indiana to the win. With less than two minutes to go in that game, a young fan sitting with his wife and baby raced onto the court in an effort to attack Gushue, but was subdued by police. Johnson had coached the second half of Game 4 (a Pacers' win), after Gushue ejected Pacers head coach Bobby Leonard at the end of the first half; Leonard claiming that the expletives he shouted at the end of the half were directed at his own player (Freddie Lewis) for a foolish play, and not at Gushue. Gushue did not change his mind and Leonard remained ejected. A fight had erupted in that game, officiated by Wally Rooney alongside Gushue, that led to a brawl involving all of both teams' players.

=== Return to NBA ===
Gushue returned to the NBA before the 1974–75 season. He and Jake O'Donnell became the first two of twenty-four referees to go out on strike in 1977, shortly before the NBA playoffs were to begin. The referees returned during the 1977 playoffs after a tentative settlement. Only two regular referees did not join the strike (Strom and Richie Powers), and the replacement referees used by the NBA were reportedly unable to control the NBA playoff games they were attempting to officiate.

Gushue and Richie Powers refereed Game 2 of the 1977 NBA Finals. Toward the end of the game, the Philadelphia 76ers 20-year old center Darryl Dawkins and the Portland Trail Blazers' enforcer, forward Maurice Lucas, were at the center of a 10-minute brawl in the fourth quarter that not only involved all of the players coming onto the court, but around 50 Philadelphia fans. Gushue and Powers tried to stop an initial altercation between the 6 ft 11 in (2.11 m) 251 lb (113 kg) Dawkins and the Trailblazers' 6 ft 6 in (1.98 m) 200 lb (90 kg) forward Bob Gross, as did the 76ers' Doug Collins (whom Dawkins inadvertently punched in the eye when trying to punch Gross). The incident exploded when the 6 ft 9 in (2.06 m) 230 lb (104.3 kg) Lucas punched Dawkins from behind and the two squared off in the manner of boxers, and a relative handful of agitated fans trying to throw punches at the Trailblazers. It took Gushue and Powers ten minutes, and the help of security guards, to regain control; ejecting both Dawkins and Lucas.

Gushue broke his ankle while working out in mid-December 1978. Gushue was dismissed by the NBA after the 1982 season (along with Bob Rakel and Jesse Kersey) on the basis knee surgery made him physically unable to perform. He had missed the entire 1982 season because of knee issues. When the referees settled a 1983 labor dispute with the league in December 1983, after a 100-day lockout by the league, the agreement specifically provided that Gushue be allowed to work until January 14, 1984, after which a panel of five would review his case. Gushue returned for the 1984 season, but needed more surgery. He retired from refereeing after the 1984 season.

== Legacy ==
During his career, Gushue officiated in the 1965 NBA All-Star Game, 1969 NBA All-Star Game, 1971 ABA All-Star Game, 1977 NBA Finals, 1978 NBA Finals, 1979 NBA Finals, 1980 NBA All-Star Game and 1980 NBA Finals. In the 1978 NBA Finals between the Seattle SuperSonics and Washington Bullets, six "Philadelphia" referees were slotted for the series (Gushue, O'Donnell, Jack Madden, Eddie Rush, Strom, and Vanak). During the 1979 NBA Finals between the SuperSonics and Bullets, Seattle coach Lenny Wilkens took the position that only the NBA's best referees should be allowed to officiate in the finals, including Gushue among the elite referees in that group. Gushue also refereed the final game of the 1980 NBA Finals between the Los Angeles Lakers and Philadelphia 76ers.

At the time of Gushue's death, future Naismith Hall of Famer and NBA senior vice president for basketball operations Rod Thorn said that in his prime as a referee, Gushue "was truly one of the best referees in the NBA . . . He had a good relationship with the players and was just outstanding". Gushue was a mentor to Philadelphia born referee Jake O'Donnell, who would become a mentor to suburban Philadelphia born referee Joey Crawford (O'Donnell knowing Crawford's father Shag as they both were Major League Baseball umpires). NBA referee Wally Rooney said Gushue "was the epitome of a teacher in officiating" to the younger referees with whom he worked, and that no one had filled this role in the same way after Gushue's retirement.

Bernie Fryer, who was an NBA referee for 28 years, spent the first half of his NBA career without the benefit of videotape of games. During the pre-video period, he described Gushue "as a tremendous teacher" who would talk the younger referees through plays with which they had been involved, that Gushue could recall in detail when educating the younger referees officiated those plays. Fryer described Gushue's general didactic style as "You know that play, kid, you had back in the fourth quarter", and then take them through it.

Joey Crawford has stated that referees do not seek praise from players or coaches for doing a good job. Rather, as a young referee he only "'wanted Joe Gushue to say, Joe [Crawford] you're a really good ref'". When Crawford was having issues early in his officiating career that affected his treatment of players and coaches, he called Gushue, whom Crawford considered his mentor. Instead of the expected pep talk, Gushue told Crawford "you're the one with the problem", which led Crawford to seek anger management treatment.

While in the ABA, Gushue scouted Ken Sussman who went on to officiate in both the ABA and NBA.

== Personal life and death ==
After retiring, Gushue returned to his former profession as a union carpenter from UBC Local 1856, working until two years before his death.

He died of heart failure on November 12, 1996, aged 64, after having battled colon cancer for a year. He was survived by his wife of 40 years Anna Mae Arndt Gushue, three children and eight grandchildren. The Joseph J. Gushue Memorial Scholarship Fund was established at Northeast Catholic High School after his death.
