= Mike Mathis =

American basketball referee

- Education: Purdue University
- Occupation: NBA referee (1976–2001)

Mike Mathis is a former professional basketball referee in the National Basketball Association (NBA) from 1976 to 2001. Over his career in the NBA, Mathis officiated nearly 2,340 games, including 12 NBA Finals and three NBA All-Star Games. Mathis wore uniform number 13 during his career. Mathis is also the owner and Chief Executive Officer of ProHoop Courts, Inc., which specializes in the installation of basketball goal systems and playing surfaces.

== Early life ==
Mathis is a graduate of St. Xavier High School in Cincinnati, Ohio, and a 1964 graduate of Purdue University. After college, he became an officer in the army. In 1966–67, Mathis was an engineer in Vietnam during the Vietnam War. From 1967 to 1972, Mathis began officiating as a high school basketball referee. In 1972, he worked college basketball games in the Big Ten, Mid-American, and Ohio Valley Conferences until being hired by the NBA in 1976.

== NBA officiating career ==
=== First game ===
Mathis' first game in the NBA, an exhibition game in 1976 at Western Michigan University's University Arena, was memorable for involving a fight between the Chicago Bulls and Milwaukee Bucks. Throughout the game, Mathis and referee Joe Gushue called 15 technical fouls and ejected five players, including Bulls' guard Jerry Sloan, Chicago coach Dick Motta, the Bucks' Swen Nater, and Bulls' Artis Gilmore.

=== NBA referees union leader ===
As his career progressed in the NBA, Mathis achieved greater influence among officials by serving on the executive committee of the NBA referees union from 1990 to 1997. During the period, he was involved in the negotiation of a new contract for referees, who went on strike to start the 1995–96 NBA season.

=== Airline ticket income investigation ===
During the late 1990s, many NBA referees became the target of an Internal Revenue Service (IRS) investigation of cash received as a result of the sale of first-class airline tickets for less expensive ones. The IRS claimed this was additional income that went unreported. In 1997, Mathis was indicted for falsifying income on tax returns and immediately resigned from the NBA. The following year, he pleaded guilty to tax evasion for understating income by $69,000 from 1989 through 1992. Mathis admitted to trading in first-class airline tickets provided by the NBA for cheaper, coach-class tickets and pocketing the difference and using several means to conceal income generated from downgrading seats, including obtaining bogus airline receipts and invoices from a travel agent in Denver, Colorado. A few months after pleading guilty, Mathis was sentenced to 120 days of home confinement, three years of probation, 200 hours of community service, and a $2,000 fine.

=== Return to the NBA ===
After nearly a two-year hiatus from the NBA, Commissioner David Stern reinstated Mathis and several other referees in January 1999 who were found guilty during the investigation. During his second stint in the NBA, Mathis officiated for two and a half seasons before retiring following a game played on December 16, 2001, in Seattle, Washington. He closed out his career as Seattle SuperSonics team officials at KeyArena shined a spotlight on him during a timeout and spectators gave him a standing ovation.

== Post-NBA officiating career ==
Mathis returned to the Seattle area following retirement to serve as a team consultant for the SuperSonics on rules violations.

Mathis has been an outspoken critic of the NBA's evaluation system of referees and league supervisors following allegations that former NBA referee Tim Donaghy was betting on league games. Mathis felt that only friends of league officials are hired to fill openings and the current supervisors are not qualified to do their jobs since he claims that "they were once referees, and they were fired. These are guys who should be teaching and training refs, but they have no business in those positions."
