= Norm Drucker =

American professional basketball referee

- Born: July 4, 1920 (Note: Drucker's date of birth is sometimes listed as 1921 or 1922, but that is the result of the common practice among NBA referees in the 1950s and 1960s to exaggerate their youth, to avoid perceived age discrimination by the NBA); New York City, New York, U.S.
- Died: February 6, 2015 (aged 94)
- Occupations: NBA referee (1953–1969) and (1976–1977), NBA Supervisor of Officials (1977–1981), ABA referee (1969–1976), ABA Supervisor of Officials (1969–1974)
- Spouse: Shirley

Norm Drucker (July 4, 1920 – February 6, 2015) was a major influence in professional basketball officiating for over 35 years. His NBA and ABA officiating career as both a referee and Supervisor of Officials spanned the careers of all-time pro basketball greats, from George Mikan, Bob Cousy, Dolph Schayes and Bob Pettit in the 1950s, to Wilt Chamberlain, Jerry West, Elgin Baylor and Bill Russell in the 1960s, to Julius Erving, Rick Barry, Bill Bradley and Walt Frazier in the 1970s and to Larry Bird and Magic Johnson in the 1980s.

== Early life ==
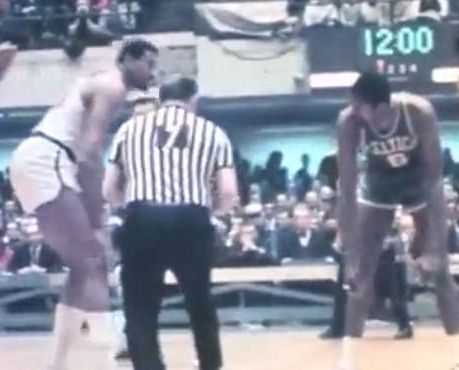
Drucker throwing the jump ball to the Philadelphia 76ers' Wilt Chamberlain (left) and the Boston Celtics' Bill Russell, to start the deciding game of the 1967 NBA Eastern Conference finals; the 76ers won and ended the Celtics string of eight consecutive NBA championships.

Drucker was born in New York City on July 4, 1920. He grew up in Brooklyn, and learned the game from the first generation of basketball superstars. Drucker attended Erasmus Hall High School in Flatbush, where he played on the basketball team, starting in 1937, in an era when there was no 3-second rule, goal tending was permitted and there was a jump ball after every basket. Erasmus reached the quarterfinals during his 1938 season. He has been called a legend of Brooklyn basketball.

== College basketball ==
He went to City College, where he played as a 5 ft 11 in (1.83 m) guard. As a junior varsity freshman under coach Sam Winograd, Drucker was described as a "scrapper" who "played hustling ball". Drucker played varsity ball under future Naismith Memorial Basketball Hall of Fame coach Nat Holman. Holman, a star in the 1930s was often referred to as "the world's best basketball player".

One of Drucker's teammates was Red Holtzman (then known as Bill) another future hall of fame coach, who would go on to lead the New York Knicks. The 1941-1942 City College team ranked number 3 in the country, and went to the National Invitation Tournament (losing to Western Kentucky 49–46), then the preeminent collegiate basketball tournament in the United States. As a part-time starter, the New York Times called Drucker "aggressive, alert and spirited".

In January 1943, World War II interrupted Drucker's college career. He served 3½ years, and was discharged as a first lieutenant. After the war, he also earned a bachelor's degree in science from CCNY.

== Professional basketball player ==
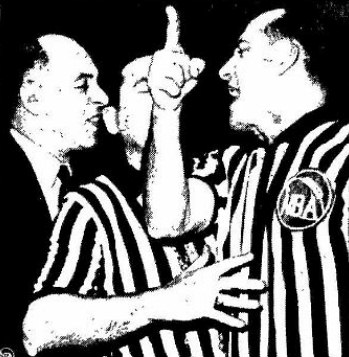
Drucker ejecting Boston Celtics coach Red Auerbach from a 1960 game at Madison Square Garden; fellow referee Arnie Heft attempts to keep the two separated.

After the war, Drucker played professionally in the New York State Professional Basketball League for the Troy Celtics. In announcing his signing with Troy, in a wonderful bit of promotional hype, the team nicknamed him "Reindeer" (the nickname didn't stick) and called him "the fastest man playing basketball today". Later, he was traded to the Trenton Tigers in the American Basketball League and played on their 1946-47 championship team.

== Referee ==
He, along with Hall of Fame referee Pat Kennedy, officiated a serious, not comic game when the Harlem Globetrotters defeated the College All-stars. Two years later he refereed one NBA game and in 1953 he moved up to the NBA with a full schedule of games.

In 1949, Drucker began his officiating career refereeing AAU, high school, collegiate, and American Basketball League. Even after becoming an NBA referee, Drucker was a teacher and administrator in the New York City School System, as his income from the NBA was meager.

=== NBA referee ===
Drucker was hired as a referee by the National Basketball Association in 1953. That year, NBA rookie officials earned $35 per game with the top veteran referees getting $50 per game. Working a full 70-game season would net a rookie referee $2,450, 29% less than the 1953 U.S. median family income of $4,000.For most officials, their NBA refereeing was their second job. After two seasons, he requested a raise of $5 per game and then-NBA President Maurice Podoloff replied, "What are you trying to do, bankrupt the NBA?" By the early 1960s, he was regularly officiating two to four games in the NBA Finals each season.

Drucker's New York Times obituary states Drucker began refereeing NBA games regularly in the 1952–1953 season where officials were paid $40 per game. At that point, the league only had 10 teams, little television coverage, and no 24-second shot clock. It also reports that he went to Podoloff asking for a $10 per game raise in the 1956–1957 season, "and Podoloff pounded his desk and roared, 'Are you trying to bankrupt the N.B.A.?'"

In the late 1950s and early 1960s, he was involved in what the press called a heated "feud" with legendary Boston Celtic coach Red Auerbach. His second ejection of Auerbach in a one-month period led to the coach's 3-game suspension by NBA president Maurice Podoloff on November 13, 1961.

=== Move to ABA ===
In 1969, when the two-year-old American Basketball Association was raiding the NBA for talent, he took the risk, along with three other NBA lead referees, Joe Gushue, Earl Strom, and John Vanak, and jumped to the financially uncertain ABA. Their contracts were the first multi-year officiating contracts in pro basketball history. Such was Drucker's stature and reputation, that his total salary, as a referee and Supervisor of Officials, along with a $25,000 signing bonus, was more than double the average NBA player's salary. According to the book "Basketball in America," the average NBA player's salary in 1969 was $35,000. It made him, at that time, the highest paid referee in the history of basketball. Within a year, all other pro basketball officials benefited, as their salaries more than doubled.

As a result, officiating professional basketball evolved from a part-time second job, Drucker's other job was as a Supervisor of Recreation for New York City's school system. There, he was "largely responsible" for establishing the first sports programs mainstreaming blind children with sighted friends to play basketball and other sports. "Aside from [a] bell on the backboard, we also placed one inside the ball itself," Drucker explained at the time. Nationally syndicated column, by the Newspaper Enterprise Association. to a full-time career, with greatly improved working conditions, benefits and pension plans. It was the first time in history that a league had promoted the quality of its officials which improved the ABA's credibility, and as a by-product enhanced the public's interest in, and respect for referees.

=== Career after merger, accomplishments and accolades ===
In the ABA, Drucker officiated and also served as the league's Supervisor of Officials. With the ABA-NBA merger in 1976, Drucker was one of only a handful of ABA referees hired by the NBA to return. Julius Erving noted, "The NBA elected to take the best of the ABA, which was me, George Gervin, David Thompson, Artis Gilmore and the coaches and the 3-point shot and the three referees." When he retired after the 1976-77 NBA season to become the NBA's Supervisor of Officials, his 24 consecutive seasons of officiating was the longest string in pro basketball history. It remains the record for longest tenure for a pro referee among those whose entire career was during the era of only two referees per game. During that span he officiated 6 All-Star Games (3 NBA, 3 ABA), a higher total than any other official in pro basketball history other than Mendy Rudolph and Earl Strom both of whom officiated seven. When he retired, his total of 38 NBA and ABA championship round games officiated was the second highest in pro basketball history.

In his 24-year officiating career (17 in the NBA and 7 in the ABA), Drucker was well known for his even-handed officiating for visiting teams in an era when many officials were criticized as "homers" - favoring the home team. In a 1969 interview with Newsday's Stan Isaacs, he said, "I think there is a part of me deep down that enjoys calling a foul against the home team and then standing out there alone, almost defying the cries of the hometown mob." During this era, Drucker and any other referee who wasn't a "homer" had to have the courage to fight off violent hometown fans. For example, the Syracuse Nationals had a fan nicknamed "The Strangler" who "thought nothing of menacing officials". "[He] tried to strangle a college referee one time. I think that's where he got his name." noted Drucker in "From Set Shot to Slam Dunk" According to Drucker, the Strangler would "run up and down the sidelines during the game...screaming, 'You SOB, you stink.'" Other incidents with fans were common in the NBA in the 1950s and 1960s. According to the Associated Press, on February 24, 1964, in Los Angeles, Drucker was "mauled and kicked as he was leaving the dressing room at halftime". But Drucker's injuries "were not serious enough to keep him from continuing". On November 15, 1958, in Detroit, after a two-point Piston loss, a fan ran onto the court and "took a punch at Norm Drucker". As late as 1964, security for NBA officials was so lax, that "a fan tangled with referees Norm Drucker and Richie Powers," as they left the court after San Francisco defeated St. Louis in a playoff game. The Bee, April 9, 1964, page 10-A. After the Lakers defeated the Celtics in game 5 of the NBA Finals in Boston on April 24, 1966, "a gaggle of idiots" confronted Drucker and Earl Strom. It was so bad in Syracuse in the 1950s that Drucker noted that when he and his officiating partner would leave the court after a Syracuse loss, "[we] would take off our belts and wrap them around our fists, with the buckles obvious to everyone. This was going to be our protection."

For 14 seasons, from 1963 through 1977, Drucker along with Mendy Rudolph and Earl Strom, were generally recognized as the top referees in pro basketball. The Sporting News noted that the other official "... is a [referee] who belongs in the company of Mendy Rudolph, Norm Drucker [and] the late Earl Strom."

As a result, assigning Drucker to big games was commonplace, and he officiated the deciding game of league championships eight times, including four times in the NBA in 1963, 1965, 1966 and 1968, and four times in the ABA, in 1971, 1972, 1974 and 1976. Of the nearly 400 referees who have officiated in the NBA and ABA, only two others Mendy Rudolph and Joe Crawford have officiated in more deciding games. With a reputation for making "gutty calls" and not "protecting" superstars he holds the distinction of being the only referee ever to eject Wilt Chamberlain from an NBA game, calling three technical fouls on Chamberlain on January 3, 1962.

Chamberlain otherwise played every minute of every game that season, except for the 8 minutes and 33 seconds after his ejection that day. The New York Times reports that it was fellow referee Earl Strom giving Chamberlain the first technical, and then Drucker came in with a second technical and an ejection because Chamberlain said Strom must be betting on the game; and then Drucker added a third for Chamberlain's profane response to the second technical. This was the only time in 14 years that Chamberlain was disqualified from an NBA game, whether by personal fouls or technical fouls. (On another occasion, Chamberlain saved Strom from an angry crowd of St. Louis Hawks fans coming toward Strom, by lifting the referee up and carrying him to the locker room.)

Drucker's career gave him a courtside view of key moments of the NBA's first 35 seasons. He was the last active NBA referee to have officiated in 1953-54—the last season before the NBA introduced the 24-second clock. That same season, he was selected to officiate the only regular-season game in NBA history that experimented with rims 12 feet, rather than 10 feet, off the ground. He officiated the games when Bob Pettit scored his 15,000th career point and Wilt Chamberlain scored his 25,000th.

He officiated the last game in the history of the ABA—the deciding game 6 of the 1976 ABA Championship Series, the deciding game of the 1963 NBA Finals, Bob Cousy's final game as a Boston Celtic, and the deciding game of the 1966 Finals, Red Auerbach's last game. The list of notable games he officiated also includes the deciding game of the 1965 NBA Finals, the deciding game of the 1968 NBA Finals, first NBA game in the current Madison Square Garden and the last NBA game at the old Madison Square Garden.

Drucker is also the link to referees whose careers span the entire history of the NBA. He partnered on the court with Sid Borgia and Hall of Fame Referee Pat Kennedy whose NBA careers started in the NBA's first season, 1946–47, and as the NBA's Supervisor of Officials, Drucker hired Joe Crawford, who was still officiating during the 2015–16 season.

At the end of his officiating career, Drucker demonstrated a commitment to improving the salary, benefits and working conditions for future generations of professional referees. In 1977, he, along with 23 of the NBA's 25 other referees went on strike before the playoffs. At 56 years old, and about to retire, he noted at the time, "I'm not going to be the recipient of the benefits [of a collective bargaining agreement] ... I could have made a good deal for myself [by not striking]. Any one of the top 14 lead referees could have. But if we went, the bottom 14 referees wouldn't have any power. [The NBA] would tear [the referees] up." After 16 days, the strike was settled with the NBA, for the first time, recognizing the referee's union. Drucker worked what remained of the 1977 playoffs and retired. Within three years, the salary and benefits for each top NBA referee increased by $100,000 per year. As he predicted, he shared in none of the improved salary and working conditions enjoyed by future generations of professional referees.

=== Supervisor of Officials ===
Despite having picketed and engaged in media interviews during the strike to bring pressure on the NBA, within four months the NBA hired him as its Supervisor of Officials. Overall, Drucker supervised and taught other referees for 10 seasons, six in the NBA, two as a crew chief (1967–1969) and four as the NBA's Supervisor of Officials (1977–81) and four as the ABA's Supervisor of the Officials (1969–73). His decade as a referee administrator had a substantial impact on NBA playing rules and improving the quality of basketball officiating.

As the NBA's Supervisor of Officials, he was one of the first NBA executives to publicly advocate the adoption of the ABA's three-point basket and the use of three referees per game. The NBA adopted the three-point basket in 1979 and adopted the three-man officiating system for the 1978–79 season, although the league returned to two officials the next season. The three-official system returned in the 1988–89 season and has been used by the NBA ever since. As an administrator in the ABA and NBA, he recruited and/or trained young referees, many of whom had long, successful NBA careers, including Joe Crawford, Bernie Fryer, Ed Middleton, Jake O'Donnell, Jack Nies, Jim Clark, Wally Rooney, and Jess Kersey.

During his tenure, he created the first formal pro basketball referee training program when the NBA contracted with the Continental Basketball Association, at that time the top pro basketball minor league. Under the program, the NBA selected, trained and financially subsidized the CBA officiating staff and hired the CBA's Supervisor of Officials. The training program's success extended decades beyond Drucker's career. By 2000, nine of the 12 referees who officiated the NBA Finals were graduates of the CBA training program. By 2008, 96% of all NBA referees had trained in the NBA's minor league training programs. Today, minor league training and development is the accepted norm for an NBA officiating career.

Also during Drucker's tenure as supervisor, he instituted the first professionally administered psychological profiling for NBA referees, to evaluate what personality traits were most common among great referees. Among the findings, said Drucker, was that to be a great referee "you've got to love [basketball] to succeed at it." As to a former NBA player becoming a referee, "Drucker observed that a 'middle- or lower-rung [basketball] player seems the type who becomes a good referee.' The star, ... is so accustomed to accolades and pats on the back that he does not have the 'loner' temperament a referee needs to reassure himself that the decision he has just made is correct and that one entire team and 18,000 fans are wrong."

== Retirement and death ==
After his retirement as Supervisor, the NBA honored him as an "All-Star" referee in the first three NBA "Legends" Games, which showcased retired NBA all-stars in an old-timer's game during NBA All-Star Weekends. He was paired with Borgia. Always a bit of a showman, he hit All-Star Coach Red Auerbach with a technical foul in the 1984 game, eliciting laughter from players and NBA executives, and fittingly, renewed anger from Auerbach, whom Drucker upset with a late foul call against Nate Thurmond.

In 1989, Drucker came out of retirement and joined the World Basketball League, a minor league, as its Supervisor of Officials, a position he held for the four-year life of that league.

Drucker was inducted into the CCNY Athletic Hall of Fame in 1986. In 1994, he was inducted into the New York City Basketball Hall of Fame for his officiating career and was also inducted in 1998 into the National Jewish Sports Hall of Fame.

His son, Jim Drucker, served as commissioner of two professional sports leagues, the Continental Basketball Association from 1978 to 1986 and the Arena Football League from 1994 to 1996, and was ESPN's legal correspondent from 1989 to 1993.

Drucker retired to East Norriton Township, Pennsylvania, and died on February 6, 2015. He is buried in the Montefiore Cemetery in Jenkintown, Pennsylvania.

== Works cited ==
- Basketball in America: from the playgrounds to Jordan's game and beyond. New York: Haworth Press. 2005. ISBN 0-7890-1612-5.
- Pluto, Terry (1990). Loose balls: the short, wild life of the American Basketball Association. New York: Simon and Schuster. ISBN 978-0-671-67390-1.
- Harvey Pollack's 2013-14 NBA Statistical Yearbook.
- Surdam, D.G. (2012). The Rise of the National Basketball Association. University of Illinois Press. ISBN 978-0-252-03713-9.
- Peterson, Robert (1990). Cages to Jump Shots. New York: Oxford University Press, USA. ISBN 978-0-19-505310-4.
- Schumacher, Michael (October 30, 2007). Mr. Basketball. New York: Bloomsbury Publishing USA. ISBN 978-1-59691-213-7. OCLC 85830728.
- Hubbard, Donald (October 1, 2013). Then Russell Said to Bird... Triumph Books. ISBN 978-1-60078-851-2.
- Kirchberg, Connie (2007). Hoop lore: a history of the National Basketball Association. Jefferson, N.C: McFarland. ISBN 978-0-7864-2673-7. OCLC 76261674.
- Salzberg, Charles (1987). From Set Shot to Slam Dunk. New York: Dutton Adult. ISBN 0-525-24555-3.
- Harvey Pollack's 2013-14 NBA Statistical Yearbook. p. 255.
- Curran, Nick (1974). National Basketball Association (NBA) Official Guide for 1974-75. The Sporting News.
- Curran, Nick (January 1, 1972). National Basketball Association Official Guide for 1972-73. The Sporting News.
- ABA Official Basketball Guide 1971-72. Sporting News. 1971.
