= 1968–69 Boston Celtics season =

NBA basketball team season (won championship)

- NBA champions
- Head coach: Bill Russell
- General manager: Red Auerbach
- Arena: Boston Garden

Results
- Record: 48–34 (.585)
- Place: Division: 4th (Eastern)
- Playoff finish: NBA champions (Defeated Lakers 4–3)
- Stats at Basketball Reference

Local media
- Television: WKBG-TV; WSBK-TV
- Radio: WHDH

The 1968–69 Boston Celtics season was their 23rd season of the Boston Celtics in the National Basketball Association (NBA). The Celtics won their 11th championship in what was Bill Russell's final season as either player or coach of the club. The Celtics had the best team defensive rating and the tenth best team offensive rating in the NBA.

== Draft picks ==
This table only displays picks through the second round.

| Round | Pick | Player | Position | Nationality | College |
|---|---|---|---|---|---|
| 1 | 12 | Don Chaney | SG | United States | Houston |

== Roster ==
1968–69 Boston Celtics roster
Players

| Pos. | No. | Player | Height | Weight | DOB | From |
|---|---|---|---|---|---|---|
| C | 28 | Jim Barnes | 6 ft 8 in (2.03 m) | 210 lb (95 kg) | 1941-04-13 | UTEP |
| PG | 7 | Em Bryant | 6 ft 1 in (1.85 m) | 175 lb (79 kg) | 1938-11-04 | DePaul |
| SG | 12 | Don Chaney | 6 ft 5 in (1.96 m) | 210 lb (95 kg) | 1946-03-22 | Houston |
| PG | 11 | Mal Graham | 6 ft 1 in (1.85 m) | 185 lb (84 kg) | 1945-02-23 | NYU |
| SG | 17 | John Havlicek | 6 ft 5 in (1.96 m) | 203 lb (92 kg) | 1940-04-08 | Ohio State |
| PF | 18 | Bailey Howell | 6 ft 7 in (2.01 m) | 210 lb (95 kg) | 1937-01-20 | Mississippi State |
| C | 26 | Rich Johnson | 6 ft 7 in (2.01 m) | 210 lb (95 kg) | 1946-12-18 | Grambling State |
| SG | 24 | Sam Jones | 6 ft 4 in (1.93 m) | 198 lb (90 kg) | 1933-06-24 | North Carolina Central |
| SF | 19 | Don Nelson | 6 ft 6 in (1.98 m) | 210 lb (95 kg) | 1940-05-15 | Iowa |
| PF | 29 | Bud Olsen | 6 ft 8 in (2.03 m) | 220 lb (100 kg) | 1940-07-25 | Louisville |
| C | 6 | Bill Russell | 6 ft 9 in (2.06 m) | 215 lb (98 kg) | 1934-02-12 | San Francisco |
| SF | 16 | Satch Sanders | 6 ft 6 in (1.98 m) | 210 lb (95 kg) | 1938-11-08 | NYU |
| PG | 20 | Larry Siegfried | 6 ft 3 in (1.91 m) | 190 lb (86 kg) | 1939-05-22 | Ohio State |

Coaches
Head coach
- Bill Russell

Legend
- (DP) Unsigned draft pick
- (FA) Free agent
- (S) Suspended
- Injured

== Regular season ==
=== Season standings ===
| Eastern Division | W | L | PCT | GB | Home | Road | Neutral | Div |
|---|---|---|---|---|---|---|---|---|
| x-Baltimore Bullets | 57 | 25 | .695 | – | 29–9 | 24–15 | 4–1 | 26–14 |
| x-Philadelphia 76ers | 55 | 27 | .671 | 2 | 26–8 | 24–16 | 5–3 | 23–17 |
| x-New York Knicks | 54 | 28 | .659 | 3 | 30–7 | 19–20 | 5–1 | 26–14 |
| x-Boston Celtics | 48 | 34 | .585 | 9 | 24–12 | 21–19 | 3–3 | 23–17 |
| Cincinnati Royals | 41 | 41 | .500 | 16 | 15-13 | 16–21 | 10–7 | 20–20 |
| Detroit Pistons | 32 | 50 | .390 | 25 | 21–17 | 7–30 | 4–3 | 13–27 |
| Milwaukee Bucks | 27 | 55 | .329 | 30 | 15–19 | 8–27 | 4–9 | 7–29 |

=== Game log ===
1968–69 game log
| # | Date | Opponent | Score | High points | Record |
| 1 | October 18 | @ Detroit | 106–88 | Larry Siegfried (26) | 1–0 |
| 2 | October 19 | @ Chicago | 106–96 | Larry Siegfried (26) | 2–0 |
| 3 | October 23 | Cincinnati | 101–108 | Howell, Sanders (21) | 3–0 |
| 4 | October 26 | Milwaukee | 89–102 | Bailey Howell (19) | 4–0 |
| 5 | October 29 | N Chicago | 103–97 | Bill Russell (17) | 4–1 |
| 6 | October 30 | Detroit | 119–117 | Bailey Howell (33) | 4–2 |
| 7 | November 1 | Philadelphia | 99–118 | Bailey Howell (32) | 5–2 |
| 8 | November 3 | @ Atlanta | 123–103 | John Havlicek (28) | 6–2 |
| 9 | November 8 | Seattle | 114–112 | Larry Siegfried (26) | 6–3 |
| 10 | November 9 | @ Milwaukee | 98–97 | Sam Jones (24) | 7–3 |
| 11 | November 11 | San Diego | 113–134 | John Havlicek (29) | 8–3 |
| 12 | November 15 | Cincinnati | 105–116 | Bailey Howell (27) | 9–3 |
| 13 | November 16 | @ San Diego | 120–112 | Sam Jones (24) | 10–3 |
| 14 | November 17 | @ Phoenix | 130–98 | Bailey Howell (28) | 11–3 |
| 15 | November 19 | @ Los Angeles | 106–116 | John Havlicek (32) | 11–4 |
| 16 | November 20 | @ Seattle | 139–92 | Havlicek, Sanders (21) | 12–4 |
| 17 | November 22 | Phoenix | 106–133 | Bailey Howell (28) | 13–4 |
| 18 | November 23 | @ New York | 100–111 | John Havlicek (28) | 13–5 |
| 19 | November 27 | New York | 117–131 | John Havlicek (31) | 14–5 |
| 20 | November 29 | Los Angeles | 93–92 | John Havlicek (28) | 14–6 |
| 21 | November 30 | @ Philadelphia | 117–113 (OT) | John Havlicek (36) | 15–6 |
| 22 | December 3 | @ Milwaukee | 137–115 | John Havlicek (41) | 16–6 |
| 23 | December 4 | Milwaukee | 99–101 | Bailey Howell (28) | 17–6 |
| 24 | December 6 | Detroit | 118–132 | John Havlicek (36) | 18–6 |
| 25 | December 7 | @ Cincinnati | 117–114 (OT) | John Havlicek (27) | 19–6 |
| 26 | December 10 | Baltimore | 115–101 | Jim Barnes (19) | 19–7 |
| 27 | December 11 | @ Detroit | 108–106 | Larry Siegfried (27) | 20–7 |
| 28 | December 13 | San Francisco | 108–98 | Bailey Howell (33) | 20–8 |
| 29 | December 14 | @ Baltimore | 101–110 | Larry Siegfried (25) | 20–9 |
| 30 | December 18 | New York | 104–98 | Bailey Howell (31) | 20–10 |
| 31 | December 21 | @ Chicago | 102–94 | John Havlicek (29) | 21–10 |
| 32 | December 26 | Milwaukee | 106–139 | John Havlicek (29) | 22–10 |
| 33 | December 28 | @ Atlanta | 97–110 | Satch Sanders (23) | 22–11 |
| 34 | December 31 | Cincinnati | 114–112 | John Havlicek (30) | 22–12 |
| 35 | January 1 | @ Phoenix | 93–87 | Havlicek, Howell (17) | 23–12 |
| 36 | January 2 | @ San Diego | 107–95 | Havlicek, Sanders (23) | 24–12 |
| 37 | January 3 | @ San Francisco | 102–104 | Satch Sanders (27) | 24–13 |
| 38 | January 5 | @ San Francisco | 134–86 | John Havlicek (33) | 25–13 |
| 39 | January 6 | @ Seattle | 121–97 | Don Nelson (28) | 26–13 |
| 40 | January 8 | Detroit | 104–113 | John Havlicek (27) | 27–13 |
| 41 | January 10 | Los Angeles | 82–88 | John Havlicek (24) | 28–13 |
| 42 | January 11 | @ Philadelphia | 111–101 | Bailey Howell (31) | 29–13 |
| 43 | January 12 | @ Milwaukee | 110–114 | Satch Sanders (23) | 29–14 |
| 44 | January 17 | San Francisco | 99–102 | Bailey Howell (25) | 30–14 |
| 45 | January 18 | Seattle | 97–111 | John Havlicek (28) | 31–14 |
| 46 | January 20 | @ Baltimore | 109–122 | Sam Jones (35) | 31–15 |
| 47 | January 22 | @ Chicago | 94–95 | Sam Jones (24) | 31–16 |
| 48 | January 24 | Philadelphia | 120–111 | Bailey Howell (26) | 31–17 |
| 49 | January 26 | Baltimore | 86–124 | Sam Jones (28) | 32–17 |
| 50 | January 28 | Atlanta | 96–108 | Don Nelson (22) | 33–17 |
| 51 | January 29 | N Seattle | 124–122 (OT) | Sam Jones (39) | 33–18 |
| 52 | January 31 | Cincinnati | W 116–101 | Bailey Howell (23) | 34–18 |
| 53 | February 1 | @ New York | L 82–109 | John Havlicek (16) | 34–19 |
| 54 | February 2 | New York | L 94–95 | John Havlicek (25) | 34–20 |
| 55 | February 4 | N San Diego | L 126–135 | John Havlicek (24) | 34–21 |
| 56 | February 5 | @ Baltimore | L 112–124 | Sam Jones (30) | 34–22 |
| 57 | February 7 | Atlanta | L 107–109 | Sam Jones (24) | 34–23 |
| 58 | February 9 | Philadelphia | W 122–117 (OT) | John Havlicek (31) | 35–23 |
| 59 | February 12 | @ Detroit | W 113–106 | Larry Siegfried (27) | 36–23 |
| 60 | February 14 | @ Atlanta | L 101–104 (OT) | John Havlicek (29) | 36–24 |
| 61 | February 16 | @ Philadelphia | L 102–127 | Sam Jones (30) | 36–25 |
| 62 | February 18 | Phoenix | W 116–110 | John Havlicek (20) | 37–25 |
| 63 | February 21 | @ Los Angeles | W 124–102 | John Havlicek (30) | 38–25 |
| 64 | February 22 | @ Phoenix | W 124–100 | John Havlicek (21) | 39–25 |
| 65 | February 23 | @ Seattle | L 116–118 | John Havlicek (25) | 39–26 |
| 66 | February 25 | N Phoenix | W 112–99 | Bailey Howell (27) | 40–26 |
| 67 | February 26 | New York | L 88–92 | Sam Jones (22) | 40–27 |
| 68 | February 28 | Atlanta | W 122–120 | Sam Jones (31) | 41–27 |
| 69 | March 1 | @ New York | 96–115 | Bill Russell (17) | 41–28 |
| 70 | March 2 | Chicago | 92–99 | Sam Jones (20) | 42–28 |
| 71 | March 4 | @ San Francisco | 95–99 | John Havlicek (29) | 42–29 |
| 72 | March 6 | @ San Diego | 97–110 | Bailey Howell (31) | 42–30 |
| 73 | March 7 | @ Los Angeles | 99–105 (OT) | John Havlicek (26) | 42–31 |
| 74 | March 9 | San Francisco | 89–138 | Larry Siegfried (25) | 43–31 |
| 75 | March 12 | @ Philadelphia | 126–117 | Sam Jones (30) | 44–31 |
| 76 | March 13 | @ Cincinnati | 110–120 | John Havlicek (27) | 44–32 |
| 77 | March 15 | @ Baltimore | 98–99 | Sam Jones (28) | 44–33 |
| 78 | March 16 | Los Angeles | 108–73 | John Havlicek (15) | 44–34 |
| 79 | March 19 | Chicago | 92–104 | Bailey Howell (27) | 45–34 |
| 80 | March 21 | N Cincinnati | 119–145 | Sam Jones (23) | 46–34 |
| 81 | March 23 | Baltimore | 98–126 | Bailey Howell (22) | 47–34 |
| 82 | March 24 | N San Diego | 107–111 | John Havlicek (31) | 48–34 |

== Playoffs ==
1969 playoff game log
Division Semifinals: 4–1 (home: 1–1; road: 3–0)

| Game | Date | Team | Score | High points | High rebounds | High assists | Location Attendance | Series |
|---|---|---|---|---|---|---|---|---|
| 1 | March 26 | @ Philadelphia | W 114–100 | John Havlicek (35) | Bill Russell (15) | Bill Russell (8) | Spectrum; 8,151 | 1–0 |
| 2 | March 28 | Philadelphia | W 134–103 | Bailey Howell (29) | Howell, Russell (16) | John Havlicek (7) | Boston Garden; 13,751 | 2–0 |
| 3 | March 30 | @ Philadelphia | W 125–118 | Sam Jones (28) | Bill Russell (18) | John Havlicek (10) | Spectrum; 15,244 | 3–0 |
| 4 | April 1 | Philadelphia | L 116–119 | John Havlicek (28) | Bill Russell (29) | Bill Russell (5) | Boston Garden; 14,017 | 3–1 |
| 5 | April 4 | @ Philadelphia | W 93–90 | John Havlicek (22) | Bill Russell (18) | Bill Russell (6) | Spectrum; 15,244 | 4–1 |

Division Finals: 4–2 (home: 3–0; road: 1–2)

| Game | Date | Team | Score | High points | High rebounds | High assists | Location Attendance | Series |
|---|---|---|---|---|---|---|---|---|
| 1 | April 6 | @ New York | W 108–100 | John Havlicek (25) | Bill Russell (16) | Em Bryant (8) | Madison Square Garden; 19,500 | 1–0 |
| 2 | April 9 | New York | W 112–97 | Bailey Howell (27) | Bill Russell (29) | John Havlicek (12) | Boston Garden; 14,933 | 2–0 |
| 3 | April 10 | @ New York | L 91–101 | Russell, Bryant (16) | Bill Russell (20) | Russell, Havlicek (8) | Madison Square Garden; 19,500 | 2–1 |
| 4 | April 13 | New York | W 97–96 | Bill Russell (21) | Bill Russell (23) | John Havlicek (4) | Boston Garden; 13,506 | 3–1 |
| 5 | April 14 | @ New York | L 104–112 | John Havlicek (29) | Bill Russell (16) | John Havlicek (7) | Madison Square Garden; 19,500 | 3–2 |
| 6 | April 18 | New York | W 106–105 | Sam Jones (29) | Bill Russell (21) | Russell, Havlicek (5) | Boston Garden; 14,933 | 4–2 |

NBA Finals: 4–3 (home: 3–0; road: 1–3)

| Game | Date | Team | Score | High points | High rebounds | High assists | Location Attendance | Series |
|---|---|---|---|---|---|---|---|---|
| 1 | April 23 | @ Los Angeles | L 118–120 | John Havlicek (37) | Bill Russell (27) | Sam Jones (6) | The Forum; 17,554 | 0–1 |
| 2 | April 25 | @ Los Angeles | L 112–118 | John Havlicek (43) | Bill Russell (21) | Bill Russell (13) | The Forum; 17,559 | 0–2 |
| 3 | April 27 | Los Angeles | W 111–105 | John Havlicek (34) | Bill Russell (18) | John Havlicek (7) | Boston Garden; 14,037 | 1–2 |
| 4 | April 29 | Los Angeles | W 89–88 | John Havlicek (21) | Bill Russell (29) | five players tied (2) | Boston Garden; 15,128 | 2–2 |
| 5 | May 1 | @ Los Angeles | L 104–117 | Sam Jones (25) | John Havlicek (14) | Russell, Havlicek (5) | The Forum; 17,553 | 2–3 |
| 6 | May 3 | Los Angeles | W 99–90 | Don Nelson (25) | Bill Russell (19) | Em Bryant (5) | Boston Garden; 15,128 | 3–3 |
| 7 | May 5 | @ Los Angeles | W 108–106 | John Havlicek (26) | Bill Russell (21) | Bill Russell (6) | The Forum; 17,568 | 4–3 |

1969 schedule

== Awards, records and milestones ==
=== Awards ===
- John Havlicek, All-NBA Second Team
- Bill Russell, NBA All-Defensive First Team
- Satch Sanders, NBA All-Defensive Second Team
- John Havlicek, NBA All-Defensive Second Team
