= Jim Drucker =

American sports executive (born 1952/53)

- Born: 1952 or 1953 (age 73–74); Brooklyn, New York City, U.S.
- Education: SUNY Buffalo; Duke Law School; Temple University School of Law
- Known for: Commissioner of the Continental Basketball Association; Commissioner of the Arena Football League; ESPN Legal Correspondent, 1989-1994.; Owner of NewKadia.com Comics
- Spouse: Fran Drucker
- Father: Norm Drucker

Jim Drucker (born 1952 or 1953 (age 73–74)) has served as the Commissioner of the Continental Basketball Association, the Legal Correspondent for ESPN, and as the Commissioner of the Arena Football League. In 2000 he founded NewKadia.com, the world's largest online-only comic-book seller.

== Biography ==
Drucker was born in Brooklyn, New York. His grandparents emigrated from Ukraine. His father, Norm Drucker, was a New York City public school teacher and principal, and then a long-time referee in the National Basketball Association (NBA) and American Basketball Association (ABA).

Drucker grew up in East Meadow in Long Island, New York. He attended SUNY Buffalo, obtaining a bachelor's degree in Political Science and Communication, and then a law degree from Duke Law School. He taught at the Temple University School of Law. He is married to Fran Drucker and now lives in Plymouth Meeting, Pennsylvania.

Drucker was commissioner of the Continental Basketball Association (CBA), a precursor to the NBA G League from 1978 to 1986. There, he negotiated the first contract with the National Basketball Association (NBA) to develop both players and referees. He also created the first-ever big money fan halftime contest, The CBA Million Dollar Supershothalf-court shot.

He was ESPN's on-camera Legal Correspondent from 1989-1994.

He was commissioner of the Arena Football League (AFL) for three seasons, starting in 1994, during which time, the league expanded from 11 to 18 teams.

In 1999, with his own collection of 850 comic books, Drucker founded NewKadia.com, the world's largest online-only comic-book seller. In 2017, it sold 250,000 comic books.
