= Emmette Bryant =

American basketball player (born 1938)

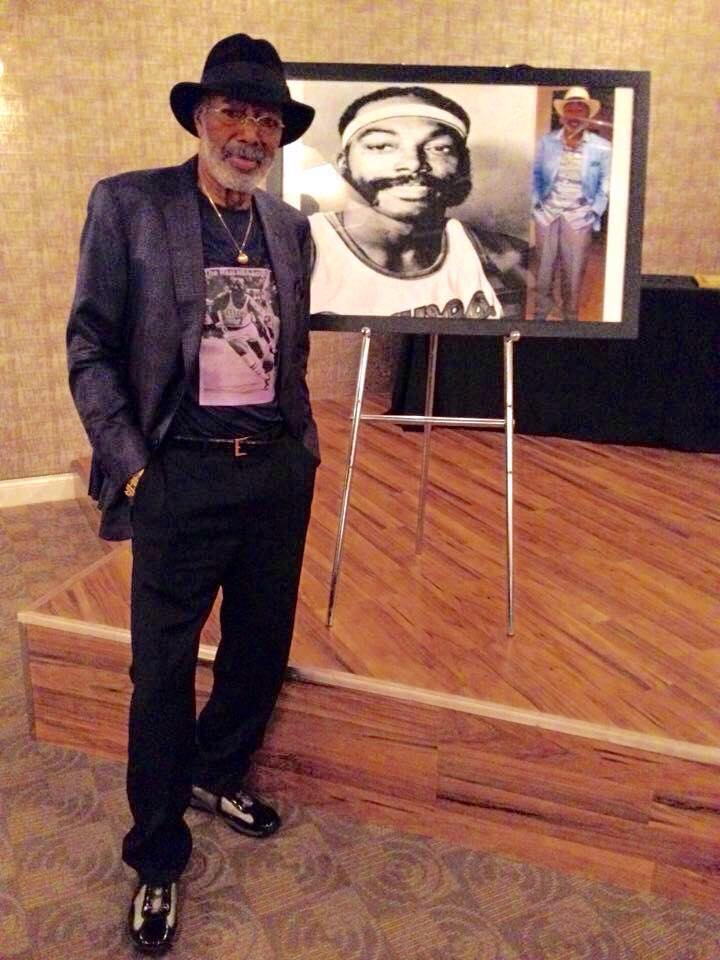

Personal information
- Born: November 4, 1938 (age 88) Chicago, Illinois, U.S.
- Listed height: 6 ft 1 in (1.85 m)
- Listed weight: 175 lb (79 kg)

Career information
- High school: DePaul Academy (Chicago, Illinois)
- College: DePaul (1961–1964)
- NBA draft: 1964: 7th round, 53rd overall pick
- Drafted by: New York Knicks
- Playing career: 1964–1972
- Position: Point guard
- Number: 7

Career history

Playing
- 1964–1968: New York Knicks
- 1968–1970: Boston Celtics
- 1970–1972: Buffalo Braves

Coaching
- 1972–1973: Columbia (assistant)
- 1973–1975: Seattle SuperSonics (assistant)

Career highlights
- NBA champion (1969)

Career NBA statistics
- Points: 3,722 (6.6 ppg)
- Rebounds: 1,593 (2.8 rpg)
- Assists: 1,700 (3.0 apg)
- Stats at NBA.com
- Stats at Basketball Reference

Emmette Bryant (born November 4, 1938) is an American former professional basketball player and the Vice President of the Chicago Chapter at NBA Alumni.

== Career ==
A 6'1" guard from DePaul University, Bryant was drafted in the 1964 NBA draft by the New York Knicks. After his time in New York, he joined the Boston Celtics and instantly became a part of the most dominant dynasty in American professional basketball history. He was a key component of the 1969 Celtics NBA championship team, contributing 20 points in the Celtics’ victory over Jerry West's Los Angeles Lakers in game seven of the 1969 NBA Finals. The win gave the Celtics their 11th championship in 13 years. Bryant spent the latter part of his career with the Buffalo Braves, who selected him in the 1970 expansion draft. He retired from the league in 1972. Altogether Bryant played eight seasons (1964–1972) in the National Basketball Association (NBA) as a member of the New York Knicks, Boston Celtics, and Buffalo Braves, scoring 3,722 points in his career.

== Post basketball ==
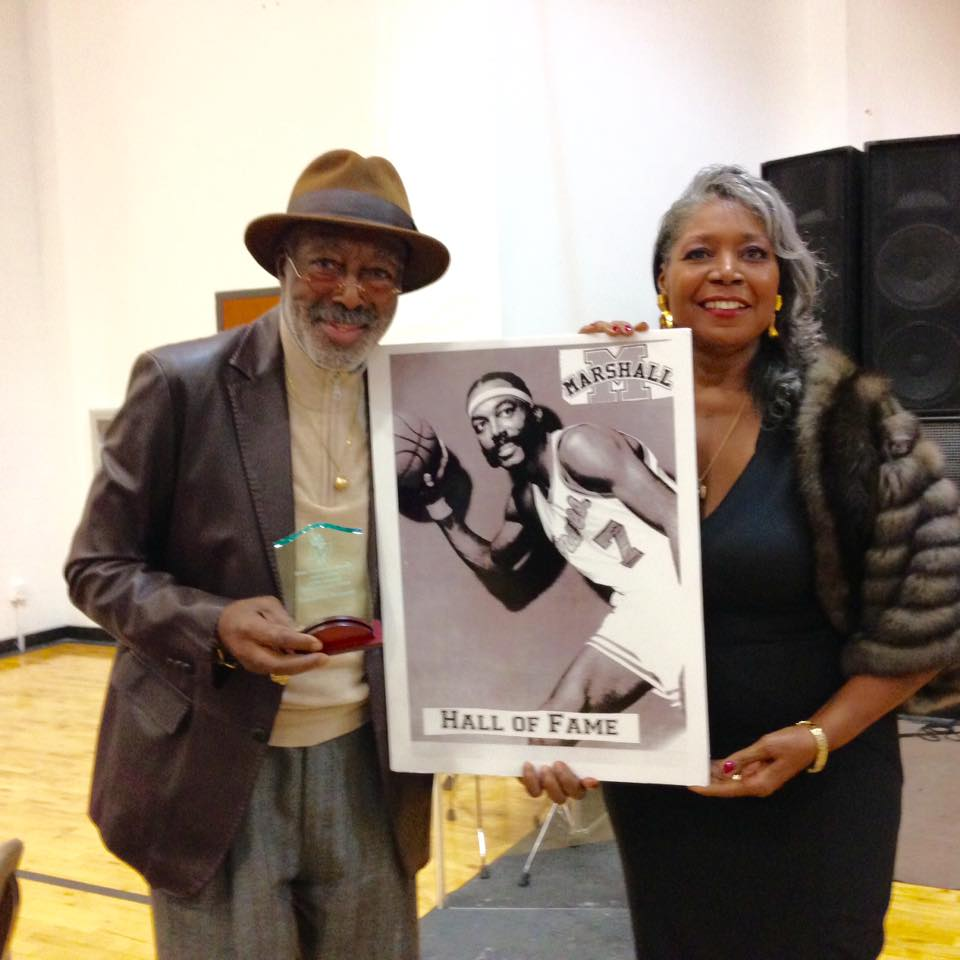
Bryant and wife Bonnie

Immediately after his playing days, Bryant became an assistant coach: one year at Columbia University and two years with Bill Russell at the NBA's Seattle SuperSonics, now the Oklahoma City Thunder, during 1973–1974. All along the way, Bryant would say, “I’m just a teacher that happened to play pro ball.” Bryant then went to work for the State of Washington for the next 30 years, starting out with the Department of Social and Health Services, in charge of recreation throughout the state for that department's correctional institutions. He later became the Recreation Director at Mission Creek Youth Camp.

Em is active in retired basketball players activities and was a key member of the executive board of the National Retired Players Association. Em is in the ChicagoLand Sports Hall of Fame 2010, DePaul Hall of Fame, and Rucker Professional Basketball Hall of Fame.

== Career statistics ==
Legend
GP	Games played	GS	Games started	MPG	Minutes per game
FG%	Field goal percentage	3P%	3-point field goal percentage	FT%	Free throw percentage
RPG	Rebounds per game	APG	Assists per game	SPG	Steals per game
BPG	Blocks per game	PPG	Points per game	**Bold**	Career high
†	Won an NBA championship	*	Led the league

=== NBA ===
==== Regular season ====
Year	Team	GP	GS	MPG	FG%	FT%	RPG	APG	PPG
1964–65	New York	77	29	17.3	.333	.654	2.2	2.2	4.9
1965–66	New York	71	4	16.8	**.472**	.733	2.4	3.0	7.0
1966–67	New York	63	**30**	25.3	.409	.649	**4.3**	3.5	8.7
1967–68	New York	77	7	12.6	.385	.686	1.7	1.7	3.7
1968–69†	Boston	**80**		17.4	.404	.650	2.4	2.2	5.7
1969–70	Boston	71		22.8	.404	**.746**	3.8	3.3	7.6
1970–71	Buffalo	73		**29.3**	.421	.744	3.6	**4.8**	**10.0**
1971–72	Buffalo	54		22.6	.459	.600	2.4	3.8	5.1
Career		566	70	20.2	.410	.690	2.8	3.0	6.6

==== Playoffs ====
Year	Team	GP	MPG	FG%	FT%	RPG	APG	PPG
1967	New York	4	19.0	.238	**1.000**	2.3	2.3	5.3
1968	New York	5	15.0	.308	.800	2.8	1.4	2.4
1969†	Boston	**18***	**33.7**	**.409**	.755	**4.9**	**3.0**	**11.0**
Career		27	28.1	.388	.797	4.1	2.6	8.6
