= Irv Gack =

American basketball executive

Irv Gack was a business executive for the St. Louis/Atlanta Hawks from 1959 to 1974.

Gack started his career in St. Louis on the game night stats crew and later was an advertising and promotion director and business manager for the Hawks franchise.

== Brawl with Referee Earl Strom ==
Earl Strom was saved from an angry mob by legendary center Wilt Chamberlain during a game played in Memphis, Tennessee in the mid-1960s. Strom had made a call that went against the St. Louis Hawks and at halftime was called a "gutless bastard" by Hawks general manager Irv Gack at the scorer's table. The fiery official asked Gack to repeat the comment as he reached across the table and grabbed Gack by the shirt. Fans started coming down from the seats while Chamberlain, playing for the Philadelphia 76ers at the time, saw what was going on. He stepped across the table, picked Strom up and said, "C'mon Earl. Let's get the hell out of here."
