= 1968–69 Philadelphia 76ers season =

Season of National Basketball Association team the Philadelphia 76ers

- Head coach: Jack Ramsay
- Arena: The Spectrum

Results
- Record: 55–27 (.671)
- Place: Division: 2nd (Eastern)
- Playoff finish: East Division Semifinals (eliminated 1–4)
- Stats at Basketball Reference

Local media
- Television: WPHL-TV
- Radio: WCAU

The 1968–69 Philadelphia 76ers season was the 76ers' 20th season in the NBA and 6th season in Philadelphia. The team posted a record of 55–27. In the opening round of the playoffs, they lost to the Boston Celtics 4–1, with 3 of the losses coming at the Spectrum. Without Wilt Chamberlain, the 76ers turned to Lucious Jackson to play center in a more up-tempo, fast-breaking style to be run by new head coach Jack Ramsay, but Jackson suffered a major injury during the season and was never the same player.

== Roster ==
Philadelphia 76ers roster
Players

Pos.	No.	Player	Height	Weight	DOB	From
G	21	Archie Clark	6 ft 2 in (1.88 m)	175 lb (79 kg)		Minnesota
F	32	Billy Cunningham	6 ft 6 in (1.98 m)	210 lb (95 kg)		North Carolina
PF	12	Johnny Green	6 ft 5 in (1.96 m)	200 lb (91 kg)		Michigan State
G	15	Hal Greer	6 ft 2 in (1.88 m)	175 lb (79 kg)		Marshall
SG	14	Matt Guokas	6 ft 5 in (1.96 m)	175 lb (79 kg)		Saint Joseph's
PF	26	Shaler Halimon	6 ft 5 in (1.96 m)	199 lb (90 kg)		Utah State
C	18	Darrall Imhoff	6 ft 10 in (2.08 m)	220 lb (100 kg)		California
F	54	Luke Jackson	6 ft 9 in (2.06 m)	240 lb (109 kg)		Texas–Pan American
G	24	Wali Jones	6 ft 2 in (1.88 m)	180 lb (82 kg)		Villanova
C	20	Craig Raymond	6 ft 11 in (2.11 m)	235 lb (107 kg)		BYU
F	25	Chet Walker	6 ft 6 in (1.98 m)	212 lb (96 kg)		Bradley
C	16	George Wilson	6 ft 8 in (2.03 m)	225 lb (102 kg)		Cincinnati

Coaches
Head coach
- Jack Ramsay

Legend
- (DP) Unsigned draft pick
- (FA) Free agent
- (S) Suspended
- Injured

== Regular season ==
=== Season standings ===
Eastern Division	W	L	PCT	GB	Home	Road	Neutral	Div
x-Baltimore Bullets	57	25	.695	–	29–9	24–15	4–1	26–14
x-Philadelphia 76ers	55	27	.671	2	26–8	24–16	5–3	23–17
x-New York Knicks	54	28	.659	3	30–7	19–20	5–1	26–14
x-Boston Celtics	48	34	.585	9	24–12	21–19	3–3	23–17
Cincinnati Royals	41	41	.500	16	15-13	16–21	10–7	20–20
Detroit Pistons	32	50	.390	25	21–17	7–30	4–3	13–27
Milwaukee Bucks	27	55	.329	30	15–19	8–27	4–9	7–29

x – clinched playoff spot

=== Game log ===
1968–69 Game log
#	Date	Opponent	Score	High points	Record
1	October 18	Los Angeles	96–114	Hal Greer (35)	1–0
2	October 19	@ Baltimore	124–121	Clark, Cunningham, Greer (26)	2–0
3	October 22	@ New York	114–117	Chet Walker (21)	2–1
4	October 25	@ Detroit	122–132	Hal Greer (30)	2–2
5	October 26	Chicago	118–122	Billy Cunningham (34)	3–2
6	November 1	@ Boston	99–118	Billy Cunningham (23)	3–3
7	November 2	Cincinnati	119–113	Billy Cunningham (25)	3–4
8	November 9	Seattle	94–114	Billy Cunningham (22)	4–4
9	November 11	N Seattle	117–127	Hal Greer (34)	5–4
10	November 15	@ Atlanta	116–115	Billy Cunningham (27)	6–4
11	November 16	Milwaukee	92–136	Billy Cunningham (29)	7–4
12	November 19	N Phoenix	110–126	Billy Cunningham (27)	8–4
13	November 22	Baltimore	110–121	Billy Cunningham (29)	9–4
14	November 23	@ Cincinnati	120–105	Billy Cunningham (31)	10–4
15	November 24	@ San Diego	128–135 (OT)	Billy Cunningham (31)	10–5
16	November 26	@ Phoenix	126–119	Wali Jones (34)	11–5
17	November 28	Los Angeles	107–122	Billy Cunningham (28)	12–5
18	November 30	Boston	117–113 (OT)	Lucious Jackson (23)	12–6
19	December 4	San Diego	99–110	Hal Greer (28)	13–6
20	December 5	@ Chicago	109–92	Billy Cunningham (23)	14–6
21	December 6	@ Milwaukee	121–112	Hal Greer (28)	15–6
22	December 7	Detroit	106–140	Shaler Halimon (23)	16–6
23	December 8	N Milwaukee	122–117	Billy Cunningham (35)	17–6
24	December 10	N San Diego	132–120	Hal Greer (25)	17–7
25	December 11	Phoenix	123–143	Billy Cunningham (25)	18–7
26	December 14	San Francisco	91–137	Greer, Imhoff (21)	19–7
27	December 15	New York	104–110	Billy Cunningham (36)	20–7
28	December 17	@ Phoenix	145–128	Billy Cunningham (32)	21–7
29	December 18	@ Seattle	115–111	Chet Walker (30)	22–7
30	December 20	@ San Diego	116–109	Hal Greer (30)	23–7
31	December 21	@ San Francisco	94–109	Billy Cunningham (24)	23–8
32	December 22	@ Los Angeles	99–102	Chet Walker (27)	23–9
33	December 25	@ New York	109–110	Hal Greer (34)	23–10
34	December 26	Baltimore	120–125	Chet Walker (34)	24–10
35	December 28	@ Cincinnati	128–123	Billy Cunningham (37)	25–10
36	December 31	@ Milwaukee	128–107	Cunningham, Walker (24)	26–10
37	January 3	Los Angeles	101–130	Billy Cunningham (27)	27–10
38	January 4	@ Baltimore	112–117	Hal Greer (33)	27–11
39	January 5	Detroit	119–126	Cunningham, Greer (30)	28–11
40	January 7	@ Detroit	114–117	Billy Cunningham (25)	28–12
41	January 8	Atlanta	111–112	Billy Cunningham (29)	29–12
42	January 11	Boston	111–101	Chet Walker (27)	29–13
43	January 17	San Diego	124–129	Hal Greer (29)	30–13
44	January 19	San Francisco	98–97	Hal Greer (23)	30–14
45	January 22	New York	137–140 (2OT)	Billy Cunningham (44)	31–14
46	January 24	@ Boston	120–111	Billy Cunningham (27)	32–14
47	January 25	Detroit	106–124	Hal Greer (22)	33–14
48	January 26	@ Atlanta	119–115	Hal Greer (31)	34–14
49	January 28	@ New York	88–121	Archie Clark (20)	34–15
50	January 29	Atlanta	96–119	Billy Cunningham (24)	35–15
51	January 30	N Cincinnati	115–116	Billy Cunningham (36)	35–16
52	January 31	Baltimore	108–105	Wali Jones (22)	35–17
53	February 2	Chicago	104–112	Wali Jones (27)	36–17
54	February 4	@ Phoenix	116–125	Billy Cunningham (36)	36–18
55	February 5	@ Seattle	119–115	Hal Greer (48)	37–18
56	February 7	@ Los Angeles	109–106	Hal Greer (28)	38–18
57	February 9	@ Boston	117–122 (OT)	Billy Cunningham (37)	38–19
58	February 11	N Cincinnati	129–112	Billy Cunningham (31)	39–19
59	February 14	San Francisco	127–111	Hal Greer (31)	39–20
60	February 16	Boston	102–127	Hal Greer (29)	40–20
61	February 18	@ San Diego	125–113	Hal Greer (30)	41–20
62	February 19	@ San Francisco	117–134	Chet Walker (32)	41–21
63	February 21	@ Seattle	115–109	Hal Greer (37)	42–21
64	February 22	@ San Francisco	129–122	Billy Cunningham (41)	43–21
65	February 23	@ Los Angeles	125–121	Hal Greer (26)	44–21
66	February 25	@ Cincinnati	120–119	Hal Greer (32)	45–21
67	February 26	Phoenix	97–104	Hal Greer (26)	46–21
68	February 27	N Detroit	123–126	Hal Greer (28)	46–22
69	February 28	N Milwaukee	123–102	Billy Cunningham (38)	47–22
70	March 2	@ Detroit	126–112	Hal Greer (39)	48–22
71	March 3	@ Milwaukee	143–132	Chet Walker (37)	49–22
72	March 4	@ Chicago	113–114	Cunningham, Greer (24)	49–23
73	March 6	@ Atlanta	99–138	Billy Cunningham (18)	49–24
74	March 7	Chicago	113–131	Hal Greer (29)	50–24
75	March 9	New York	101–110	Cunningham, Jones (25)	51–24
76	March 11	@ New York	101–121	Billy Cunningham (23)	51–25
77	March 12	Boston	126–117	Chet Walker (26)	51–26
78	March 13	@ Chicago	113–106	Billy Cunningham (28)	52–26
79	March 15	Atlanta	120–122	Billy Cunningham (39)	53–26
80	March 19	Seattle	115–136	Hal Greer (34)	54–26
81	March 22	@ Baltimore	116–108	Chet Walker (25)	55–26
82	March 24	Cincinnati	125–119	Chet Walker (28)	55–27

== Playoffs ==
1969 playoff game log
Division Semifinals: 1–4 (home: 0–3; road: 1–1)

Game	Date	Team	Score	High points	High rebounds	High assists	Location Attendance	Series
1	March 26	Boston	L 100–114	Billy Cunningham (29)	Darrall Imhoff (19)	Billy Cunningham (6)	Spectrum; 8,151	0–1
2	March 28	@ Boston	L 103–134	Chet Walker (26)	Billy Cunningham (11)	Matt Guokas (4)	Boston Garden; 13,751	0–2
3	March 30	Boston	L 118–125	Billy Cunningham (33)	Imhoff, Cunningham (14)	Hal Greer (7)	Spectrum; 15,244	0–3
4	April 1	@ Boston	W 119–116	Hal Greer (24)	Darrall Imhoff (20)	Hal Greer (7)	Boston Garden; 14,017	1–3
5	April 4	Boston	L 90–93	Billy Cunningham (23)	Darrall Imhoff (19)	Archie Clark (7)	Spectrum; 15,244	1–4

1969 schedule

== Awards and records ==
- Billy Cunningham, All-NBA First Team
- Hal Greer, All-NBA Second Team
