= Sid Borgia =

American basketball referee

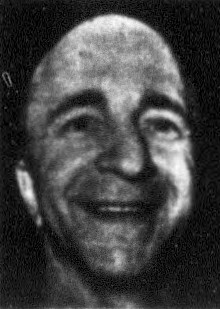
Borgia, circa 1963

Sid Borgia (January 10, 1917 – January 25, 1999) was an American professional basketball referee in the National Basketball Association (NBA) from 1946 to 1964 and later was the league's supervisor of officials from 1964 to 1966. Borgia also served as chief of officials in the American Basketball Association.

Borgia was considered one of the best referees of his era along with Mendy Rudolph, Norm Drucker, and Earl Strom. Borgia is known for saying "Yes! And it counts" during basketball games when a player is fouled and scores a basket in the process. This phrase is used by sports play-by-play announcer Marv Albert, which has become one of the most famous broadcasting calls in basketball.

Borgia's officiating career ended with the NBA as a result of the influence team owners had in the decisions made by the league in its early years. Towards the end of the 1963-64 NBA season, the St. Louis Hawks were playing for a division title, and late in a game, Borgia ejected star player Bob Pettit after complaining about a personal foul call. Hawks team owner Ben Kerner demanded that Borgia be fired and Borgia never officiated another NBA game.

Sid Borgia was married for 54 years and had five children, two of whom also became NBA referees.
