= Earl Strom =

American basketball referee (1927–1994)

- Strom Hall of Fame photo
- Born: December 15, 1927; Pottstown, Pennsylvania, US
- Died: July 10, 1994 (aged 66); Pottstown, Pennsylvania, US
- Spouse: Yvonne
- Children: 5
- Basketball career
- Position: NBA referee (1957–1969; 1973–1990); ABA referee (1969–1972)
- Officiating career: 1957–1990
- Basketball Hall of Fame

Earl "Yogi" Strom (December 15, 1927 – July 10, 1994) was an American professional basketball referee for 29 years in the National Basketball Association (NBA) and for three years in the American Basketball Association (ABA). Strom is credited as one of the great referees in the history of the NBA and was known for his flamboyant style and ability to control the game. Nicknamed "The Pied Piper", the assertive Strom made foul calls with his whistle by using a "tweet-pause-tweet-tweet" tune and pointing at the offending player. In addition to calling fouls with flair, he was known for ejecting players from games with style and he sometimes supported his rulings with physical force.

Over the course of his career, he officiated 2,400 professional basketball regular season games, 295 playoff games, 7 All-Star games, and 29 NBA and ABA Finals. For his extensive contributions to the game, Strom was posthumously elected to the Naismith Memorial Basketball Hall of Fame in 1995.

== Early life ==
Strom was born December 15, 1927, in Pottstown, Pennsylvania, to Orthodox Ashkenazi Jewish immigrants from Austria-Hungary, Max and Bessie Strom. Earl's father, Max, was a foreman at a bakery, and Earl grew up in the kosher household as the youngest of seven children comprising five boys and two girls. As a child, he became interested in athletics and competing in sports, and this interest lasted throughout his childhood and into high school. At Pottstown High School, Strom played football, baseball, and basketball. One of his classmates in high school was future major league baseball pitcher, and American League MVP, Bobby Shantz. In 1989, he was inducted into the Pottstown School District Alumni Honor Roll.

After graduating from high school in 1945, he enlisted in the United States Coast Guard, serving during the final months of World War II. Returning from service, Strom attended Pierce Junior College (now Pierce College) in Philadelphia, Pennsylvania, where he graduated in 1951. Following school, the young Strom continued participating in sports and played for a local semi-professional basketball team in his early 20s. During a basketball game, he had an argument with a referee and the referee said "Look, you're not much of a player, and you've got a pretty good mouth on you, so why don't you think about taking up refereeing?" Following the advice of the referee, Strom decided to get into officiating. He officiated high school games for nine years as well as college games in the East Coast Athletic Conference for three years.

In 1952, he married Yvonne Trollinger, and the couple went on to have five children. Outside of officiating, Strom worked at General Electric in customer relations starting in 1956 and continued in this role through his first stint in the NBA. He felt this "day job" provided security to his family since officiating in the NBA did not at the time.

== Professional basketball officiating career ==
=== National Basketball Association (1957–1969) ===
==== Early years ====
Strom became an NBA referee with the start of the 1957–58 NBA season after accepting an invitation to join the league from Jocko Collins, supervisor of officials. He further developed his skills in the league by learning from other officials such as Mendy Rudolph, Norm Drucker, and Sid Borgia. Strom ascended to the top of the officiating ladder by the end of his third season in the league as he was assigned playoff games, which was uncommon for lesser experienced referees at the time. The following year, Strom and Rudolph made NBA history when they officiated the 1961 NBA Finals between the Boston Celtics and St. Louis Hawks. This was the only time in NBA history that the same two officials worked an entire series, which was the result of the two teams not agreeing on any other officials to use in the series.

In 1959, Strom refereed the first NBA game Wilt Chamberlain played against Bill Russell, and he called the last game they played against each other ten years later. Early in longtime referee Joey Crawford's career he was paired with Strom in a game where Crawford ejected a coach two minutes into the game. Strom berated Crawford during halftime, with "every name in the book", and told Crawford, "'I like that you have guts, but you've got to have smart guts like me.'"

Six years into his NBA career, Strom had worked every playoff game in the semi-finals and finals along with Rudolph. In fact, the former was assigned to any seventh and deciding game in a series during this time. He was also involved in one of the most memorable moments in NBA history during the 1965 Eastern Conference finals between the Boston Celtics and Philadelphia 76ers. In the seventh and final game, the 76ers trailed the Celtics 110–109 with five seconds left. The 76ers had possession of the ball and attempted to inbound the pass as the Celtics' John Havlicek tipped the pass thrown by Hal Greer and preserved the Celtics victory. Celtics' radio announcer Johnny Most made his most fabled call: "Havlicek stole the ball! Havlicek stole the ball!" And all this while, Strom had officiated the game in a cast as he had broken his hand while punching a fan during an altercation at a game the previous night.

==== Memorable encounter with Wilt Chamberlain ====
In another significant moment in his officiating career, Strom was saved from an angry mob by legendary center Wilt Chamberlain during a game played in Memphis, Tennessee, in the mid-1960s. Strom had made a call that went against the St. Louis Hawks and at halftime was called a "gutless bastard" by Hawks general manager Irv Gack at the scorer's table. The fiery official asked Gack to repeat the comment as he reached across the table and grabbed Gack by the shirt. Fans started coming down from the seats while Chamberlain, playing for the Philadelphia 76ers at the time, saw what was going on. He stepped across the table, picked Strom up and said, "C'mon Earl. Let's get the hell out of here."

==== Controversies ====
More controversies surrounded Strom when he was again involved in a historical NBA moment during the 1967 NBA All-Star Game. As one of the referees in the game, Strom was responsible for the ejection of Red Auerbach, head coach of the East All-Stars. Auerbach remains the only coach to be ejected in an All-Star Game. Nevertheless, Strom was subsequently designated crew chief in 1967 and 1968 when the league hired Dolph Schayes as supervisor of officials for the NBA. He was put in charge of scouting crews, rating referees, and developing the skills of lesser experienced referees as well as working a schedule of games.

==== Departure to the American Basketball Association ====
After more than a decade's experience in the game, Strom was offered a salary contract over 82 games for $16,000 for the first time by Commissioner Walter Kennedy in August 1969. It was at this time that Strom became interested in listening to what the ABA, which started in 1967, had to offer in the bidding war that ensued between the two leagues over talent. The NBA did not offer benefit plans such as pension, family hospitalization, and long-term disability, which were of importance to Strom and his family.

Lured by Borgia, who jumped from the NBA to the ABA to become supervisor of officials, Strom and three other officials—John Vanak, Norm Drucker, and Joe Gushue—met with acting ABA Commissioner Jim Gardner during the summer of 1969. The ABA accepted Strom's demands of a $25,000 per year salary, a $25,000 signing bonus, and a health insurance and pension plan. As the four officials left for the ABA in 1969, it brought reform to NBA referees in terms of compensation and benefits. Regular officials in the NBA were offered contracts and salaries increased significantly. Additionally, medical and pension plans were provided for the officials.

=== American Basketball Association (1969–1972) ===
==== Differences between the leagues ====
While Strom earned more than twice as much in the ABA than the NBA, he soon became disenchanted with the ABA for the lack of big name superstars and arenas that the NBA provided. Strom had anticipated that the ABA product would be inferior to the NBA, but assumed that the increase in pay would compensate for the level of play. However, he fed off the energy of the fans when officiating games and the small attendance sizes in the ABA made him feel depressed.

==== Controversies ====
Controversy again did not elude Strom in the ABA. In a 1970 game between the Texas Chaparrals and Denver Rockets in Denver, Colorado, he was attacked by a fan who came onto the court after Strom confronted the fan who was using profanity. Strom threw two punches before police officers took the fan away. For his involvement in the incident, Strom was fined $250 by the league.

Not long after, he was fined by the league again. Following an exhibition game that Strom officiated between the Virginia Squires and Kentucky Colonels, he told a Philadelphia reporter that he had just seen the greatest player alive, referring to Julius Erving. While Erving was a very influential player in his era, the president of the Colonels, Mike Storen, complained that Strom was promoting players. The league fined Strom $50, but he sent $100 to Commissioner Jack Dolph saying, "The first fifty dollars is for the fine and the second fifty dollars is because I'm tellin' ya' he is the greatest."

==== Departure from the American Basketball Association ====
After the conclusion of his third season in the ABA, the dissatisfied Strom contacted NBA Commissioner Walter Kennedy to discuss returning to the NBA. Encouraged with the support of Wayne Embry and Pat Williams, general managers of the Milwaukee Bucks and Chicago Bulls respectively, Strom met with Kennedy during the 1972 ABA Playoffs. Kennedy informed Strom that John Nucatola, supervisor of officials, manages the staffing of officials, but Strom received a vote of confidence to come back to the NBA in the form of a handshake from the commissioner.

Strom met with Nucatola and discussed salary and benefits. Strom was told by Nucatola that he would be getting a $25,000 salary and was guaranteed a job in the NBA for the start of the 1972–73 NBA season through a handshake agreement although no contract was signed. Strom was told a contract would be available to sign upon the completion of his twelve-game ABA playoff officiating schedule. Strom called the league to ask why he was not scheduled to officiate after his guaranteed schedule of games and was told by Norm Drucker, then supervisor of officials for the ABA, "You know the reason. They know you're going back [to the NBA] and they told me not to assign you any more playoff games."

=== Return to the National Basketball Association ===
With his ABA career over following the playoffs in 1972, Strom contacted Nucatola to get an NBA contract signed for the 1972–73 NBA season. Nucatola told Strom to call back after the conclusion of the 1972 NBA Playoffs. Strom called Nucatola following the NBA playoffs, but was told to "wait a little longer." Strom continued to have difficulties with Nucatola over the next several months and finally sought the assistance of Richie Phillips, a Philadelphia attorney and NBA player representative.

Strom filed a $275,000 suit against the NBA in December 1972 for breach of an oral contract when John Nucatola told Strom that he could return to the league. The league filed preliminary objections to have the suit dismissed, but were overruled by the court. The NBA then moved for summary judgment which was denied. Concerned that there could be legitimate action taken, the NBA decided to give Strom his job back if he dropped the suit. Strom agreed to the terms and signed a contract before the start of the 1973–74 NBA season.

=== National Basketball Association (1973–1990) ===
==== Changes in the National Basketball Association ====
Strom returned to the NBA and was among a regular staff of twenty officials. Since Strom had left the NBA in 1969, referees now made twice the salary and received pension, health, and insurance plans.

==== Memorable games ====
In 1987, Strom refereed Julius Erving's last game in the NBA (with the 76ers). In 1971, he had refereed Erving's first game, playing for the Squires in the ABA.

Strom ejected Chicago Bulls mascot, Benny the Bull, in the third game of the 1974 NBA Playoffs series between the Bulls and Milwaukee Bucks. Strom had ejected head coach Dick Motta after receiving a second technical foul for storming onto the court to argue with referee Don Murphy. As Motta left the court, Benny charged onto the court after Murphy and made obscene gestures to both officials, prompting the ejection. It is believed to be the first time a mascot was thrown out of an NBA game in history.

During a game in 1982, Frank Layden, then head coach of the Utah Jazz, had seen enough of his team's poor performance and wanted an early exit. Layden verbally abused Strom so he could get ejected from the game. Strom knew what he was trying to do, and when Layden asked why he didn't eject him, Strom replied, "I know what you're trying to do, Frank, but if I've got to stay out here and watch this shit, so do you." After Game 4 of the 1987 NBA Finals between the Los Angeles Lakers and Boston Celtics, Red Auerbach confronted Strom in the hallway near the locker rooms and told Strom, "That was the worst officiated game I ever saw!", referring to the fact that the Lakers shot 14 free throws in the fourth quarter to the Celtics' 1. Strom stared back at Auerbach and said, "Arnold, you're showing all the class I knew you always had."

The Atlanta Hawks and Chicago Bulls played a game in the late-1980s that Strom officiated. Chicago's Michael Jordan attempted a slam dunk on a fast break and was undercut by an Atlanta player. Strom called a flagrant foul and a player on the Atlanta bench yelled at Strom, "Ah, you're just protecting the superstars" to which Strom replied, "Damn right I am, you eliminate these guys from the game and we're all out of work." Strom officiated Kareem Abdul-Jabbar's final game during the 1989 NBA Finals. Strom congratulated Jabbar and gave him the game ball in the locker room.

==== Referee strike ====
During the 1977 NBA Playoffs, twenty-four of the regular referees in the NBA went on strike. Strom and Richie Powers were the only two referees not to strike. Strom honored his contract since he felt that it was valid through the season and a strike would be a violation of the contract. Referees were seeking the right to collective bargaining, an arbitration clause that would lessen the power that team owners have on officials, life insurance paid to age sixty-five, severance pay, increase in salary and playoff pay, and an increase expense compensation.

After fifteen days and two rounds of the playoffs, the referees union, the National Association of Basketball Referees, was recognized as a bargaining agent for officials and playoff salaries increased from $150 a game to $750, $850, and $950 for the final three rounds of the playoffs. During the strike, Strom was officiating a playoff game between the Portland Trail Blazers and Denver Nuggets in Denver, Colorado, and was notified at the conclusion of the game of a death threat against him phoned in to McNichols Arena at halftime.

==== Controversies ====
Strom's first notable incident since returning to the league that received attention by the NBA front office was during the 1974–75 NBA season. Strom officiated a game in Seattle and inadvertently pushed a woman who approached him at the scorer's table at the conclusion of the game. Seattle SuperSonics guard Fred Brown pushed Strom into the crowd as retaliation for what he had done to the woman. Bill Russell, who was coaching the SuperSonics at the time and referee Hugh Evans separated Strom and Brown from a further altercation. Strom originally was going to be suspended six games by commissioner J. Walter Kennedy, but that was changed to a $600 fine. Strom went to the referees union to appeal the fine based on the notion that he was trying to defend himself. The union did not follow through with the appeal, but the fine was rescinded a year later by new commissioner Larry O'Brien and Strom was reimbursed his fine payment.

Strom was officiating an NBA game during the mid-1970s between the Philadelphia 76ers and New Jersey Nets with Dick Bavetta as his partner for that game. The game was close at the end and Earl made a last-second call against the Nets, ending the game with a win for Sixers. Suddenly Dick Bavetta ran across floor to the scorer's table, saying, "No! No! I got a push off against McGinnis!" Strom then challenged Bavetta, "Are you overruling my call? I got pushing off right here!" Bavetta insisted, which reversed Strom's call and the Nets wound up with the victory. With the game over, players were walking to their respective locker rooms when the door to the referees' locker room flew open and Dick Bavetta came staggering out. His uniform was ripped and he was wearing a big welt over his eye, running to get away from Strom. Strom stepped out into the hallway and hollered after Bavetta, "You'll take another one of my fucking calls again, right, you motherfucker?" Strom was later fined for the incident.

Strom was suspended from working any further games in the 1976 NBA Finals between the Boston Celtics and Phoenix Suns after Game 2 because the Suns had complained about the foul disparity of the first two games in the series. In the first two games, the Celtics attempted 58 free throws while the Suns had 44.

Strom wrote a weekly column for newspapers near Pottstown which provided a perspective of the life of an NBA referee. In the spring of 1979, Strom criticized Chicago Bulls team management, in particular president Jonathan Kovler, over the firing of head coach Larry Costello after 56 games. While this incident was occurring, shortly after, Strom was involved in a shoving match with a fan and security officer following a game played in Phoenix, Arizona. These incidents led to Strom being suspended the remainder of the 1979 NBA Playoffs and was required to apologize to Kovler. In order to keep his job, Strom assured the league that there would be no animosity directed towards the Bulls and decided to discontinue writing his weekly column.

During the early 1980s, The Philadelphia Inquirer spoke with Strom to get a perspective on the life of an NBA referee for an article. The sports reporter met Strom in a hotel lobby and was later joined by Milwaukee Bucks assistant coach, John Killelea. The three of them discussed referees and life in the NBA. When the article was published, the reporter wrote that he and Strom were joined by an assistant coach, whom Strom had bought a drink, and the tendencies for Strom to go into pressboxes to drink a cup of coffee and to talk with spectators that he knew in the stands. While the league had approved the article, Strom was fined $2,000 and suspended a portion of the playoffs.

During the mid-1980s, Strom had a couple incidents with team personnel being in the referees' locker room, which was against league rules. In 1985, Dallas Mavericks owner Don Carter entered the locker room and accused Strom of having a vendetta against Dick Motta, coach of the Mavericks. The next year during the 1986 NBA Playoffs game between the Atlanta Hawks and Boston Celtics at the Boston Garden in Boston, Massachusetts, Hawks coach Mike Fratello was attacked by a fan. Fratello walked into the officials locker room and reported the incident to Strom. Strom eventually was fined and worked a couple more playoff games that year.

Nearly halfway through the 1987–88 NBA season, Strom was fined $150 for reversing a field goal that San Antonio Spurs' Mike Mitchell made at the end of the half against the Indiana Pacers. Strom was concerned about making the correct call after being told by Pacers coach Jack Ramsay and referee Tommy Nuñez that Mitchell's shot attempt came after the period expired.

==== Final years ====
During the 1989–90 NBA season, USA Today took a poll on the best players, coaches, and referees in the league as voted by coaches and players. Strom was considered the league's top official in the NBA, receiving 83 out of a possible 193 votes. At the same time, the Detroit Free Press conducted a survey of 500 players, coaches, general managers, broadcasters, writers, and fans to determine the best official in each professional sport. Strom was chosen as the best official in the NBA and the top official overall among Bruce Froemming (Major League Baseball), Jim Tunney (National Football League), and Andy Van Hellemond (National Hockey League).

Strom's final game was Game 4 of the 1990 NBA Finals between the Detroit Pistons and Portland Trail Blazers played June 12, 1990, in a game that saw Strom correctly wave off Trail Blazers Danny Young's half-court heave that would have sent the game into OT, had it come before the buzzer.

== Post officiating career ==
After his retirement from the NBA, Strom worked as a television color commentator for the Los Angeles Clippers from 1990 to 1991 and wrote a book detailing his officiating career entitled, Calling the Shots: My Five Decades in the NBA in 1990. Strom also participated in charitable events, such as being involved in a celebrity golf tournament hosted by Penn State University, and coaching at a basketball tournament run by Celtics great Larry Bird in Indianapolis, Indiana. Not long before his death, Strom wrote a column for the Reading Eagle and Chicago Sun-Times. It was through this column that Strom discovered he had a malignant brain tumor, a form of cancer, by doctors after his wife, Yvonne, found grammatical errors as she prepared to type the column on a computer. Strom began surgery on the tumor in January 1994, which was successful, but he could not overcome the effects of the cancer and died on July 10, 1994.

== Legacy ==
If there's one official who can't be intimidated or influenced by players, coaches, and fans, it's Earl Strom. The thing I respect him for, aside from being a very good official, is that you can get hot with him one night and have a few words, yet the next time you get him working your team he's ready to start fresh. No grudges or antagonism from him.

— Lenny Wilkens, Hall of Fame player and coach

Earl Strom is a throwback, a reminder of the days when the refs had colorful personalities, the days when war-horses like Mendy Rudolph, Norm Drucker, and a younger Earl Strom were called the father, the son, and the holy ghost.

— Roy Firestone, sports commentator

Coaches, general managers, owners and players always mentioned Earl as the best.

— Mike Mathis, former NBA referee

Watching Strom work a game is like watching Michael Jordan work a defense.

— Jack McCallum, sports journalist

Strom retired having officiated 2,067 NBA games over 29 years. Currently, only referees Dick Bavetta and Jake O'Donnell have officiated more games. Strom was selected to officiate five of the nine NBA Finals that went seven games (the maximum number of games possible in a series) in 1966, 1969, 1978, 1984, and 1988, and is considered the last of an era for the "charismatic referee" type to officiate in the NBA. This is in contrast to today's officials who are said to blend into the background during a game and all bear a similar appearance and use of hand signals.

During his career in the NBA, Strom was given the nickname of the "Road Ref" by Harvey Pollack, a statistician for the Philadelphia 76ers. Throughout the year, Pollack noted how many times the home or visiting team was victorious and who were the officials working the game. Strom had the highest percentage of road team victories among NBA referees at 42.9 percent. This was the result of Strom refusing to favor the home team and letting the fans sway his decisions.

When Strom started his career in the NBA, he felt the most important aspect was to get the play right. Instead of selling a bad call, he felt that officials should admit their mistake, and get the call right. To get plays called correctly, he brought up the idea of limited use of instant replay for shots made at the end of a period ("buzzer beaters") and three-point attempts. The NBA eventually adopted the use of instant replay for end of the period field goal attempts and fouls at the start of the 2002–03 NBA season. Strom believed that referee's job was to ensure the game is played correctly, which will allow players to play their particular style.

As the NBA began to evolve, Strom opposed the addition of the third official in NBA game for one season, the 1978–79 NBA season, and later in its present form since the 1988–89 NBA season. Strom felt that well-conditioned officials who are able to stay on top of the play would be able to make calls that a third official would be responsible for.

Pottstown High School created the "Earl Strom Financial Aid Scholarship", which is awarded to a member of the senior class who has been accepted by an accredited college. The Earl "Yogi" Strom Sportsmanship Award was created in 1995, and is presented by the Pennsylvania Interscholastic Athletic Association's Pottstown Chapter to an area school displaying outstanding courtesy and sportsmanship.

== Awards, honors, accomplishments, and recognition ==
Strom has received the following awards, honors, and recognition, and accomplished the following, among other things;

- Inducted (posthumously) into Naismith Memorial Basketball Hall of Fame (1995)
- A full size photo of Strom blowing his whistle has been displayed at the Naismith Hall of Fame
- Officiated 29 NBA and ABA Finals and 295 total playoff games
- Officiated 7 NBA All Star Games
- Inducted into Pottstown Sports Hall of Fame (May 16, 1984)
- Inducted into Pennsylvania Sports Hall of Fame (Oct. 31, 1987)
- Inducted into Philadelphia Sports Hall of Fame (2020)
- Inducted into the International Jewish Sports Hall of Fame (2008)
- Inducted into the Pottstown School District Alumni Honor Roll (1989)
- Earl Strom Financial Aid Scholarship awarded by Pottstown High School
- Earl "Yogi" Strom Sportsmanship Award presented by the Pennsylvania Interscholastic Athletic Association's Pottstown Chapter

== Work cited ==
- Strom, Earl; Johnson, Blaine (1990). Calling the Shots: My Five Decades in the NBA. New York: Simon & Schuster. ISBN 0-671-66108-6.
