= John Vanak =

American basketball referee

John Joseph Vanak (1933 – November 26, 2016) was a referee in the American Basketball Association and the National Basketball Association.

He was a United States Navy Veteran serving during the Korean War on the USS Roosevelt. He was first employed as a sergeant for the Lansford, Pennsylvania Police Department. Vanak was also the owner of the Vanak Detective Agency for over 30 years. His boyhood nickname was "Punchy". Vanak began refereeing junior high games in 1956 to stay in shape and pick up cigarette money, but it was not until 1959 that he started to officiate in earnest.

Vanak worked in the old American Basketball League (ABL), a league created by Harlem Globetrotters owner Abe Saperstein in 1961 and which lasted less than two seasons. Then he went on to the NBA at a time when the officials were permitted some showing of personality in their profession. He officiated during his first go-around in the NBA from 1962 to 1969. For half of those years he continued working as a $4,100-a-year policeman and he worked for at the private detective agency.

In 1969, when the upstart American Basketball Association was raiding the NBA for talent, Vanak, along with three other top NBA "lead" referees—Joe Gushue, Earl Strom and Norm Drucker—jumped to the ABA with multi-year contracts paying much higher salaries than NBA officials received. As a result, professional officiating salaries dramatically increased. The ABA battled the NBA for nine years, and eventually four ABA teams were absorbed into the NBA in 1976 to end the ABA. The ABA "merger" effectively modernized the NBA with the 3-point shot, the highlight dunking and fast break game and the advent of free agency. Amidst the drives and dunks and changing dress and hairstyles of the 1970s, was the professionalization of officiating, which had been a per diem profession before then. NBA officials were still being paid by the game into the 1960s, up to $125. Vanek officiated from 1976 until 1988 in his second go-around in the NBA.

Vanak officiated in the 1966 NBA All-Star Game, 1970 ABA All-Star Game, 1972 ABA All-Star Game, 1974 ABA All-Star Game, 1975 ABA Playoffs, 1977 NBA Finals, 1979 NBA All-Star Game, 1980 NBA Finals, 1981 NBA Finals, 1983 NBA Finals, 1984 NBA All-Star Game and 1985 NBA Finals.

Vanek was chosen as the league's best official in 1978-79 and reffed a total of 3,028 games in the NBA and ABA, 328 playoff games, 31 finals and seven all-star games.
