= Jess Kersey =

American basketball referee

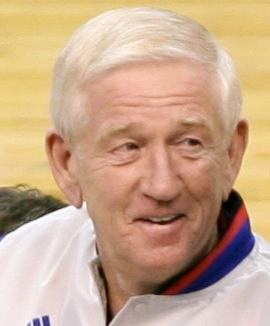
Kersey in 2007

Jesse Kersey (January 12, 1941 – April 22, 2017) was an American basketball referee who worked for the American Basketball Association and the National Basketball Association.

Born in Newport News, Virginia, Kersey attended Thomas Nelson Community College.

Joining the NBA in 1973, Kersey was a highly regarded referee and officiated at the 1975 ABA All-Star Game, the NBA All-Star Games in 1983, 1987 and 2002, and the NBA Finals in 1983, 1984, 1986 and 1991.

During his 30-year career, he officiated 1,911 regular season games, 189 playoff games and 18 NBA Finals games.

In July 1997, Kersey resigned from the NBA after 24 seasons as a referee after he pleaded guilty to tax evasion. Kersey returned to the NBA for the 1998–99 season and continued working games until the 2006–07 season. On April 10, 2007, Kersey was injured after Corey Maggette collided with him, and Kersey underwent hip replacement surgery the following year. Kersey was inducted into the Virginia Sports Hall of Fame in 2012.

Kersey died of cancer on April 22, 2017, in Williamsburg, Virginia, at the age of 76.
