= Mendy Rudolph =

American basketball referee (1926–1979)

- Born: March 8, 1926; Philadelphia, Pennsylvania, U.S.
- Died: July 4, 1979 (aged 53); New York City, U.S.
- Occupation: Sportscaster (1975–1977)
- Spouse: Susan (1973–his death)
- Basketball career
- Position: NBA referee
- Officiating career: 1953–1975
- Basketball Hall of Fame

Marvin "Mendy" Rudolph (March 8, 1926 – July 4, 1979) was an American professional basketball referee in the National Basketball Association (NBA) for 22 years, from 1953 to 1975. One of the few basketball game officials to be inducted into the Basketball Hall of Fame, Rudolph was the first league referee to work 2,000 games. and officiated 2,112 NBA games in all, a record that he held at retirement. He was also selected to referee eight NBA All-Star Games and made 22 consecutive NBA Finals appearances.

Following his career as a referee, he was a color commentator for CBS Sports's coverage of the NBA on CBS for three seasons from 1975 to 1978 and he appeared in a television advertisement for Miller Lite. He was a member of the Naismith Memorial Basketball Hall of Fame Class of 2007.

== Personal life ==
=== Early life and family ===
Born in Philadelphia, Pennsylvania, Rudolph was raised in Wilkes-Barre, Pennsylvania. His father, Harry Rudolph, was a prominent basketball referee and baseball umpire. Mendy Rudolph played basketball as a child and eventually chose the same profession as his father. Upon graduating from James M. Coughlin High School, he began officiating basketball games at the Wilkes-Barre Jewish Community Center and later worked scholastic games. At age 20, he was recruited to referee games alongside his father, who served as Eastern Professional Basketball League (Eastern League) President from 1956 to 1970. During his career in the Eastern League, he officiated his first Eastern League President's Cup championship series in 1948 and was selected as a referee in at least one game in every President's Cup playoff and championship series between 1949 and 1953. At the same time, he also served in the United States Air Force during the Korean War.

Rudolph was married twice. His first marriage was to his childhood sweetheart and together they raised three children, but the relationship became troubled and eventually ended. In 1961, he met Susan, a receptionist at the WGN office in New York City, while both worked for the station. At the time, Rudolph worked at WGN as an additional job outside of officiating, which was common among referees from his era. Mendy and Susan Rudolph were married in 1973. Two years later, their first child, Jennifer Rudolph, was born.

=== Gambling problem ===
Throughout his life, Rudolph suffered from a gambling problem and was labeled a "compulsive gambler". He would often spend his leisure time placing bets at race tracks and Las Vegas, Nevada, and Puerto Rico casinos. At that time, NBA referees were allowed to gamble, but this practice has since been prohibited. As he incurred gambling losses, Rudolph was once offered by a Las Vegas gambler to erase his outstanding debt by participating in point shaving. However, he refused to accept the offer and said to his wife, "It goes against all my principles. I love the game too much, respect it too much. I couldn't do it to you. I couldn't do it to the memory of my father, and I couldn't do it to myself. If I have to go into bankruptcy, something I'd hate to do, I'd do it," according to a 1992 New York Times interview with Susan Rudolph. Rudolph had cashed in his $60,000 pension fund to pay debts and he still owed an additional $100,000. While he refused to seek professional help, Rudolph cut back on his gambling habit later in his life.

== NBA officiating career ==
=== Early years ===
Rudolph was recommended by Eddie Gottlieb, coach and owner of the NBA's Philadelphia Warriors at the time, to then-NBA commissioner Maurice Podoloff, after observing Rudolph officiate an exhibition game. Rudolph was hired by the NBA in February 1953, midway through the 1952–53 NBA season and he became the youngest official in the league. In his early years with the NBA, Rudolph quickly became an established official as he worked playoff games within his first two years in the league. One of Rudolph’s early NBA refereeing mentors was Charley Eckman, an original NBA referee.

=== Memorable NBA Finals games ===
Rudolph officiated the 1955 NBA Finals between the Syracuse Nationals and Fort Wayne Pistons, which was notable for its actions by fans, fights between players, and attacks on referees. Game 3 of the series, played in Indianapolis, Indiana, was interrupted by a fan who threw a chair on the floor and ran on the court to protest calls made by Rudolph and referee Arnie Heft. Six years later, he made history by officiating the entire 1961 NBA Finals between the Boston Celtics and St. Louis Hawks with his colleague Earl Strom.

Rudolph and Strom officiated another notable game in the 1964 NBA Finals. In Game 5 of the championship series, Wilt Chamberlain, playing for the San Francisco Warriors, knocked out Clyde Lovellette of the Boston Celtics with a punch. Celtics head coach Red Auerbach stormed onto the court and demanded that Chamberlain be thrown out of the game. The latter told Auerbach if he did not "shut up", he would be knocked down to the floor with Lovellette. Auerbach countered the threat, "Why don't you pick on somebody your own size." Rudolph intervened the discussion and told Auerbach, "Red, do you have any other seven-footers who'd like to volunteer?"

=== Head of officials ===
As his career progressed in the league, Rudolph took on responsibilities beyond officiating. In 1966, he was named referee-in-chief and worked alongside Dolph Schayes, who was hired as the league's supervisor of officials that year to replace Sid Borgia. In this position, he oversaw areas that pertained to referee mechanics, techniques, and rule interpretations. Rudolph, who was widely respected by his peers, coaches, and players, wrote the NBA Official's Manual and Case Book.

While he served as head of officials, the NBA lost four veteran officials—Norm Drucker, Joe Gushue, Earl Strom, and John Vanak to the rival American Basketball Association (ABA) in 1969 over salary and benefits. At the time of transaction, Rudolph told Strom, "(Deputy Commissioner) Carl [Scheer], (NBA Commissioner) Walter [Kennedy], and I were prepared to offer you guys the greatest contract in the history of pro basketball."

By the 1969–70 season, Rudolph successfully encouraged the league to adopt a plain gray referee uniform over the traditional "zebra" shirt to de-emphasize the presence of officials in games.

=== Final years ===
By 1975, Rudolph's health condition began to deteriorate and he was forced to retire after suffering a blood clot in his lung during a 1975 NBA playoff game between the Buffalo Braves and Washington Bullets, played April 25, 1975. In his final game, he had to be carried off the court. On November 9, 1975, Rudolph officially ended his career as a referee in the NBA, in which he officiated more games (2,113) than any official in league history at the time. Earl Strom later broke Rudolph's record and officiated over 2,400 games in his 30-year career; the record is currently held by Rudolph's replacement, Dick Bavetta, who officiated 2,635 games over 30 seasons (1975–2014).

== Post-officiating career ==
=== Broadcasting ===
Following his officiating career, Rudolph transitioned to a career in broadcasting. During the 1975-76 and 1976-77 NBA seasons, he worked as a television analyst for CBS Sports covering The NBA on CBS. During his first season, he was paired with Brent Musburger and Rick Barry for the 1976 NBA Finals. This championship series was most memorable for a triple-overtime Game 5, which has been labeled the "greatest game" in NBA history. In this game, Celtic John Havlicek made an apparent game-winning field goal at the conclusion of the second overtime. The game clock had expired, but Rudolph, along with Musburger and Barry, noted that the shot was made with two seconds remaining. Referee Richie Powers, however, decided that one second remained in the second overtime period.

=== Television commercial ===
In 1976, Rudolph was featured in a Miller Brewing Company television advertisement along with then-Celtics head coach Tom Heinsohn to promote Miller Lite's "Tastes Great, Less Filling" advertising campaign. Rudolph and Heinsohn debated whether Miller Lite was less filling or tastes great in a bar room scene. After Heinsohn refused to agree that Lite was, first and foremost, less filling, Rudolph threw his thumb in the air and screamed, "You're out of the bar." This advertisement popularized Miller's campaign slogan and the campaign was named eighth best of the 20th century by Advertising Age in 1999.

== Legacy ==
Rudolph died on July 4, 1979, from a heart attack in New York City. Mendy and Susan Rudolph were standing outside a movie theatre entrance when Mendy collapsed. After unsuccessful attempts at mouth-to-mouth resuscitation, he was taken to a hospital where he died an hour after arrival. At the time of his death, then-NBA Commissioner Larry O'Brien said of Rudolph, "Mendy's contributions to the integrity of pro basketball are legendary." Officials wore a patch with Rudolph's uniform number, 5, on their sleeves the following season after his death, the 1979-80 NBA season, to honor him. No other official in the NBA has worn this number to the present day.

Known for his charisma, personality, and iconic stature on the court, Rudolph symbolized NBA officiating during the early years of the NBA to fans of professional basketball and became the most recognizable official during the NBA's first four decades. Bob Ryan of The Boston Globe said of Rudolph, "If any man other than Red Auerbach ever earned the title of NBA institution, it was certainly Mendy Rudolph." Upon retirement, he set a precedent for the standards that future referees are judged. Early in his officiating career, Joe Crawford (later hired by the NBA in 1977) attended games that Rudolph worked in Philadelphia, Pennsylvania, and studied his style and approach. Earl Strom credited Rudolph for being an influence on the development of his career in the NBA. In his autobiography, Calling the Shots, Strom described Rudolph as "one of the most prominent referees because of his style, courage, and judgment. He had excellent judgment. He made the call regardless of the pressure, whom it involved, or where it was." Strom later told The New York Times that "Mendy Rudolph was simply the greatest referee of all time."

Strom was also an advocate to get Rudolph enshrined into the Naismith Memorial Basketball Hall of Fame. On April 2, 2007, Rudolph was announced as one of the seven members of the Basketball Hall of Fame's Class of 2007 to be enshrined in September 2007, twenty-eight years after his death. It was reported that the length of time for Rudolph to become elected was the result of his gambling lifestyle. He became the thirteenth referee to be inducted into the Hall of Fame.
