= Richie Powers =

American basketball referee

- Powers officiating the 1976 NBA Finals
- Born: October 14, 1930; New York City, New York, U.S.
- Died: July 31, 1998 (aged 67); Allentown, Pennsylvania, U.S.
- Occupation: NBA referee (1956–1979)
- Spouse(s): Virginia; a second marriage ended in 1987

Richard Francis Powers (October 14, 1930 – July 31, 1998) was an American professional basketball referee in the National Basketball Association (NBA) from 1956 to 1979. He worked 25 NBA Finals games, including the triple-overtime Game 5 contest in the 1976 NBA Finals between the Phoenix Suns and Boston Celtics, considered "the greatest game ever played" in the NBA, as well as three All-Star Games. Following his career in the NBA, Powers was a sportscaster for WABC-TV.

== Early life and career ==
Powers attended St. John's University and played baseball under Frank McGuire. Before joining the NBA, Powers worked as a minor league baseball umpire in the Eastern League.

== NBA officiating career ==
=== 1976 NBA Finals ===
Powers officiated the triple-overtime Game 5 of the 1976 NBA Finals, which was notable for controversial moments involving Powers. With the score tied at 95 with three seconds remaining in the fourth quarter, Boston stole a Suns inbound pass and the Celtics' Paul Silas attempted to call a time-out by giving the "T" sign to Powers. Boston had no timeouts remaining, which if recognized, would have resulted in a technical foul and a free throw awarded to Phoenix. But inexplicably, Powers did not acknowledge Silas's request for the time-out as time expired. Mendy Rudolph and Rick Barry, color commentators for the CBS Sports telecast, were quick to note that Silas was signaling for a timeout, but Powers ignored the request. Boston went on to win the game in the third overtime period. According to the Suns organization, Powers later told a Phoenix golf professional that he didn't want to see the championship decided on a technicality. Angered over the incident, Al Bianchi, then-assistant coach of the Suns, ordered a ring in which the words "Fuck You, Richie Powers" were inscribed.

Powers was also attacked in the same game by an irate Celtics fan on the court after making the decision to put one second back on the game clock following a made bank shot by the Celtics' John Havlicek at the end of the second overtime that put Boston up by 1. The game clock expired as Havlicek made the field goal, and fans at the Boston Garden stormed onto the court assuming the game was over. Rick Barry and play-by-play announcer Brent Musburger were quick to note on the telecast of the game that two seconds remained, but Powers made the decision that only one second remained in the second overtime period after order was restored in the arena.

=== Decision to retire ===
Powers' strength among the referees was diminished considerably when he was one of two referees (with Earl Strom) who did not strike during the 1977 playoffs. Two incidents in the 1977–78 and 1978–79 seasons further reduced his reputation: In a February 1978 game between the New Jersey Nets and Atlanta Hawks, Powers, to avoid being badgered, told coaches Kevin Loughery and Hubie Brown that they could play zone defenses. One sportswriter in the arena reported this to the league which resulted in Powers' being suspended for three weeks and fined $2,500. In a November 8, 1978, game between the Nets and 76ers at the Spectrum, Powers hit both Kevin Loughery and then rookie Bernard King with their third technical fouls, over the "limit" of two prescribed by an unwritten rule, although Powers claims he was not reminded that each person was hit with a previous technical foul by the other officials working the game with him. This resulted in Powers' being fined and suspended again, and the game being restarted from the point of the technicals after an upheld protest. Nets guard Eric Money played in the replay of the game's last few minutes in March 1979. At that point he had been traded to the Sixers, resulting in him becoming the only professional basketball player to score for two different teams in one game.

Powers retired from the NBA after the 1978–79 season.

== Later life ==
After leaving the NBA, he became a sportscaster on WABC-TV in New York, New York. After his contract expired, he became Director of Operations for the United States Basketball League in 1985. He left this position, presumably after the NBA signed most of the newly formed minor league's talent. After selling cable television subscriptions and cars, he returned to his former position with the USBL in 1990. He was a longtime member of the Westchester Country Club in Rye, New York, and died of a stroke in 1998 in Allentown, Pennsylvania at the age of 67.
