= Bill Russell =

American basketball player and coach (1934–2022)

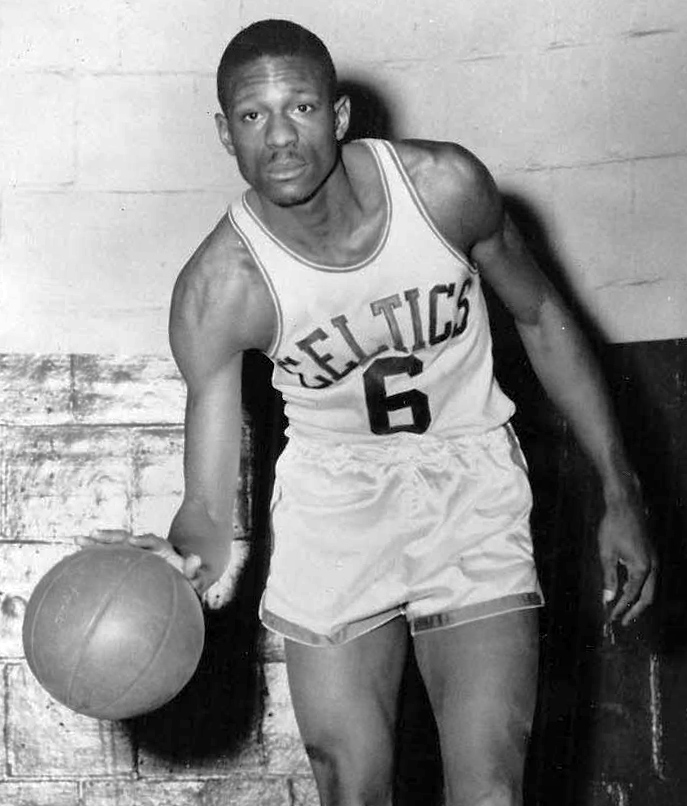
- Russell with the Boston Celtics, c. 1960

Personal information
- Born: February 12, 1934 Monroe, Louisiana, U.S.
- Died: July 31, 2022 (aged 88) Mercer Island, Washington, U.S.
- Listed height: 6 ft 10 in (2.08 m)
- Listed weight: 215 lb (98 kg)

Career information
- High school: McClymonds (Oakland, California)
- College: San Francisco (1953–1956)
- NBA draft: 1956: 1st round, 2nd overall pick
- Drafted by: St. Louis Hawks
- Playing career: 1956–1969
- Position: Center
- Number: 6
- Coaching career: 1966–1988

Career history

Playing
- 1956–1969: Boston Celtics

Coaching
- 1966–1969: Boston Celtics
- 1973–1977: Seattle SuperSonics
- 1987–1988: Sacramento Kings

Career highlights
- As player: 11× NBA champion (1957, 1959–1966, 1968, 1969) (Note: Russell won 11 NBA championships as a player for the Boston Celtics. Those 11 championships include two that he won as the team's player-coach (1968, 1969).); 5× NBA Most Valuable Player (1958, 1961–1963, 1965); 12× NBA All-Star (1958–1969); NBA All-Star Game MVP (1963); 3× All-NBA First Team (1959, 1963, 1965); 8× All-NBA Second Team (1958, 1960–1962, 1964, 1966–1968); NBA All-Defensive First Team (1969); 4× NBA rebounding champion (1958, 1959, 1964, 1965); NBA anniversary team (25th, 35th, 50th, 75th); No. 6 retired by Boston Celtics; No. 6 retired by NBA leaguewide; SI Sportsman of the Year (1968); 2× NCAA champion (1955, 1956); NCAA Tournament Most Outstanding Player (1955); UPI College Player of the Year (1956); 2× Helms Player of the Year (1955, 1956); 2× Consensus first-team All-American (1955, 1956); WCC Player of the Year (1956); 3× First-team All-WCC (1954–1956); No. 6 retired by San Francisco Dons; Presidential Medal of Freedom (2011); As coach: 2× NBA champion (1968, 1969)

Career NBA playing statistics
- Points: 14,522 (15.1 ppg)
- Rebounds: 21,620 (22.5 rpg)
- Assists: 4,100 (4.3 apg)
- Stats at NBA.com
- Stats at Basketball Reference

Career coaching record
- NBA: 341–290 (.540)
- Record at Basketball Reference
- Basketball Hall of Fame
- FIBA Hall of Fame
- Collegiate Basketball Hall of Fame
Medals
Men's basketball
Representing the United States
Olympic Games
| Gold medal – first place | 1956 Melbourne | Team competition |

William Felton Russell (February 12, 1934 – July 31, 2022) was an American professional basketball player who played center for the Boston Celtics of the National Basketball Association (NBA) from 1956 to 1969. He was the centerpiece of the Celtics dynasty that played for 12 NBA championships and won 11 during his 13-year career. Russell is widely considered one of the greatest basketball players of all time.

Russell played college basketball for the San Francisco Dons, leading them to consecutive NCAA championships in 1955 and 1956. He was named NCAA tournament Most Outstanding Player (MOP), and captained the gold medal-winning U.S. national basketball team at the 1956 Summer Olympics. These victories along with his NBA championships made Russell one of only eight players in the history of men's basketball to achieve the Triple Crown.

After being chosen by the St. Louis Hawks with the second overall pick in the 1956 NBA draft, Russell was traded to the Boston Celtics for Celtics center Ed Macauley and small forward Cliff Hagan. With Russell as their starting center and defensive anchor, the Celtics went on to win their first NBA championship in 1957 and won an NBA record eight consecutive championships from 1959 to 1966. A five-time NBA Most Valuable Player (MVP) and a 12-time NBA All-Star, Russell's rebounding, defense, and leadership made him one of the dominant players of his era. Standing at 6 ft 10 in (2.08 m) tall, with a 7-foot-4-inch (2.24 m) arm span, his shot-blocking and man-to-man defense were major reasons for the Celtics' dominance during his career. Russell also led the NBA in rebounds four times, had a dozen consecutive seasons of 1,000 or more rebounds, and remains second all-time in both total rebounds and rebounds per game. Russell played in the wake of black pioneers Earl Lloyd, Chuck Cooper, and Sweetwater Clifton, and he was the first black player to achieve superstar status in the NBA. During the final three seasons of his career (1966–1969), he served as player-coach of the Celtics, becoming the first black NBA coach to win a championship. Russell ended his playing career and left his position as Celtics coach after helping the Celtics win the 1969 NBA championship.

Russell served as head coach and general manager of the Seattle SuperSonics from 1973 to 1977. He also coached the Sacramento Kings from 1987 to 1988. Russell also worked as a color commentator and authored several books.

Russell was inducted into the Naismith Memorial Basketball Hall of Fame in 1975, was one of the founding inductees into the National Collegiate Basketball Hall of Fame in 2006 and was enshrined in the FIBA Hall of Fame in 2007. He was selected into the NBA 25th Anniversary Team in 1971 and the NBA 35th Anniversary Team in 1980, was named as one of the 50 Greatest Players in NBA History in 1996 (being one of only four players to receive all three honors), and was selected to the NBA 75th Anniversary Team in 2021. In 2009, the NBA renamed the NBA Finals MVP Award in his honor. In 2011, Barack Obama awarded Russell the Presidential Medal of Freedom for his accomplishments on the court and in the civil rights movement. In 2021, Russell was inducted into the Naismith Memorial Basketball Hall of Fame a second time in recognition of his coaching career. Shortly after his death in 2022, the NBA retired Russell's #6 jersey league-wide, making him the only player in NBA history to receive that honor, as well as the third person in North American major professional sports to have their jersey number retired league-wide, after Jackie Robinson and Wayne Gretzky.

== Early life ==
=== Family ===
William Felton Russell was born on February 12, 1934, to Charles Russell and Katie Russell in West Monroe, Louisiana. Like many Southern towns and cities of that time, Monroe was segregated, and the Russells often struggled with racism in their daily lives. Russell's father was once refused service at a gas station until the staff had taken care of all the white customers first. When he attempted to leave and find a different station, the attendant stuck a shotgun in his face and threatened to kill him if he did not stay and wait his turn. In another incident, Russell's mother was walking outside in a fancy dress when a white policeman accosted her. He told her to go home and remove the dress, which he described as "white woman's clothing".

During World War II, the Second Great Migration began, with large numbers of Black people leaving the South to find jobs in the rest of the U.S. When Russell was eight years old, his father moved the family to Oakland, California. While there, they fell into poverty and Russell spent his childhood living in a series of public housing projects.

His father was said to be a "stern, hard man" who initially worked in a paper factory as a janitor, which was what sports journalist John Taylor called a typical "Negro Job"—low-paid and not intellectually challenging. When World War II broke out, the elder Russell became a truck driver. Russell was closer to his mother Katie than to his father, and he received a major emotional blow when she suddenly died when he was 12 years old. His father gave up his trucking job and became a steelworker to be closer to his children. Russell stated that his father became his childhood hero, later followed up by Minneapolis Lakers superstar George Mikan, whom he met when he was in high school. Of Russell, the college basketball player, Mikan said: "Let's face it, he's the best. He's so good, he scares you."

Russell's older brother was playwright Charlie L. Russell.

=== Initial exposure to basketball ===
During his early years Russell struggled to develop his skills as a basketball player. Although he was a good runner and jumper and had large hands, he did not understand the game and was cut from the team at Herbert Hoover Junior High School. As a freshman at McClymonds High School in Oakland, Russell was almost cut again, but coach George Powles saw Russell's raw athletic potential and encouraged him to work on his fundamentals. After Russell was cut from the junior varsity basketball team as a junior in high school, Powles gave him a spot on the varsity team and bought him a yearlong community center membership. Since Russell's previous experiences with white authority figures were often negative, warm words from Powles reassured him. Frank Robinson, a future member of the Baseball Hall of Fame, was one of Russell's high school basketball teammates.

Russell soon became noted for his unusual style of defense. He later recalled: "To play good defense ... it was told back then that you had to stay flatfooted at all times to react quickly. When I started to jump to make defensive plays and to block shots, I was initially corrected, but I stuck with it, and it paid off." In an autobiographical account, Russell said that while on a California High School All-Stars tour, he became obsessed with studying and memorizing other players' moves, e.g., footwork such as which foot they moved first on which play, as preparation for defending against them, which included practicing in front of a mirror at night. Russell described himself as an avid reader of Dell Magazines' 1950s sports publications, which he used to scout opponents' moves for the purpose of defending against them.

Russell was ignored by college recruiters and did not receive an offer until recruiter Hal DeJulio from the University of San Francisco (USF) watched him play in a high school game. DeJulio was unimpressed by Russell's meager scoring and "atrocious fundamentals", but he sensed that the young Russell had an extraordinary instinct for the game, especially in the clutch. Russell eagerly accepted the offer. Sports journalist John Taylor described the scholarship offer as a watershed event in Russell's life because Russell realized that basketball was his chance to escape poverty and racism, and he swore to make the best of it. Russell graduated from McClymonds in 1952.

== College career ==
=== University of San Francisco ===
==== Basketball ====
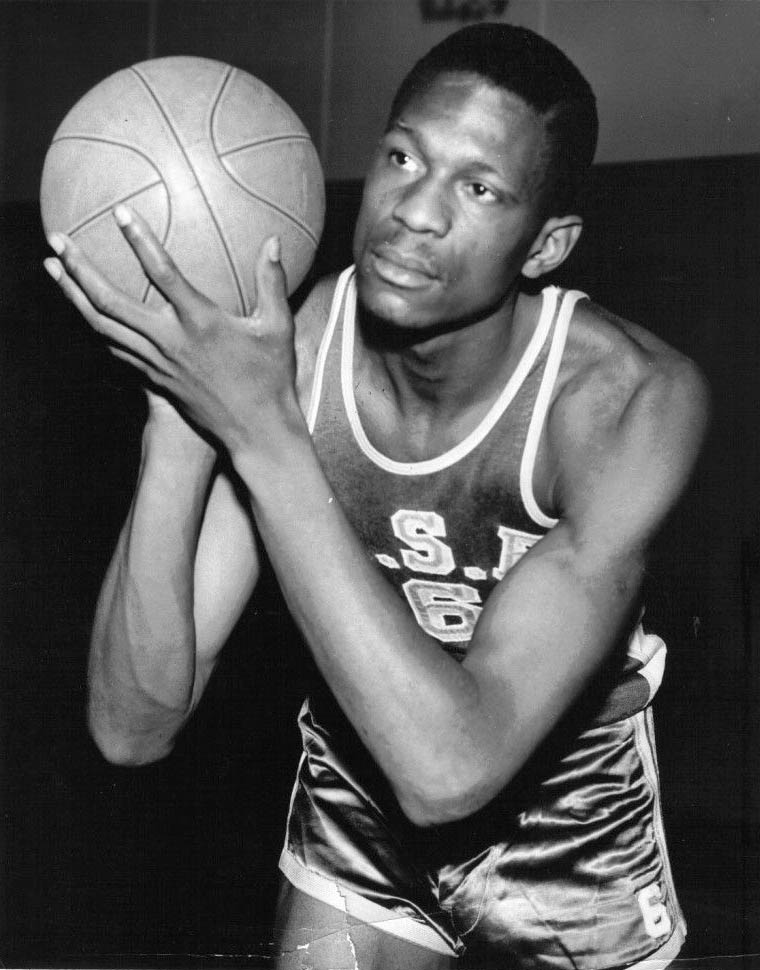
Russell practicing a free throw at the University of San Francisco, c. 1953–56

Russell started college at USF in 1952. He averaged 20 points per game on the Dons' freshman basketball team, and made his varsity debut on December 1, 1953. He became the starting center for coach Phil Woolpert, who emphasized defense and deliberate half-court play, which favored Russell's exceptional defensive skills. Woolpert's choice of how to deploy his players was unaffected by their skin color. In 1954, he became the first coach of a major college basketball program to start three African-American players: K. C. Jones, Hal Perry, and Russell. In his USF years, Russell took advantage of his relative lack of bulk to guard other players than the opposing center: using his quickness and speed, he would double-up on forwards and aggressively challenge their shots. Russell played on USF's varsity team from 1953 to 1956.

Combining the stature and shot-blocking skills of a center with the foot speed of a forward, Russell became the centerpiece of a USF team that soon became a force in college basketball. After USF kept Holy Cross Crusaders star Tom Heinsohn scoreless in an entire half, Sports Illustrated wrote: "If [Russell] ever learns to hit the basket, they're going to have to rewrite the rules." The NCAA in fact did; the lane was widened for his junior year. After he graduated, the NCAA rules committee instituted a second new rule to counter the play of big men like Russell; basket interference was now prohibited. Russell became one of several big men who have brought about NCAA rule changes. The NCAA had previously prohibited goaltending in response to George Mikan (1945) and later banned the dunk shot due to Lew Alcindor (1967), although the latter rule was later repealed.

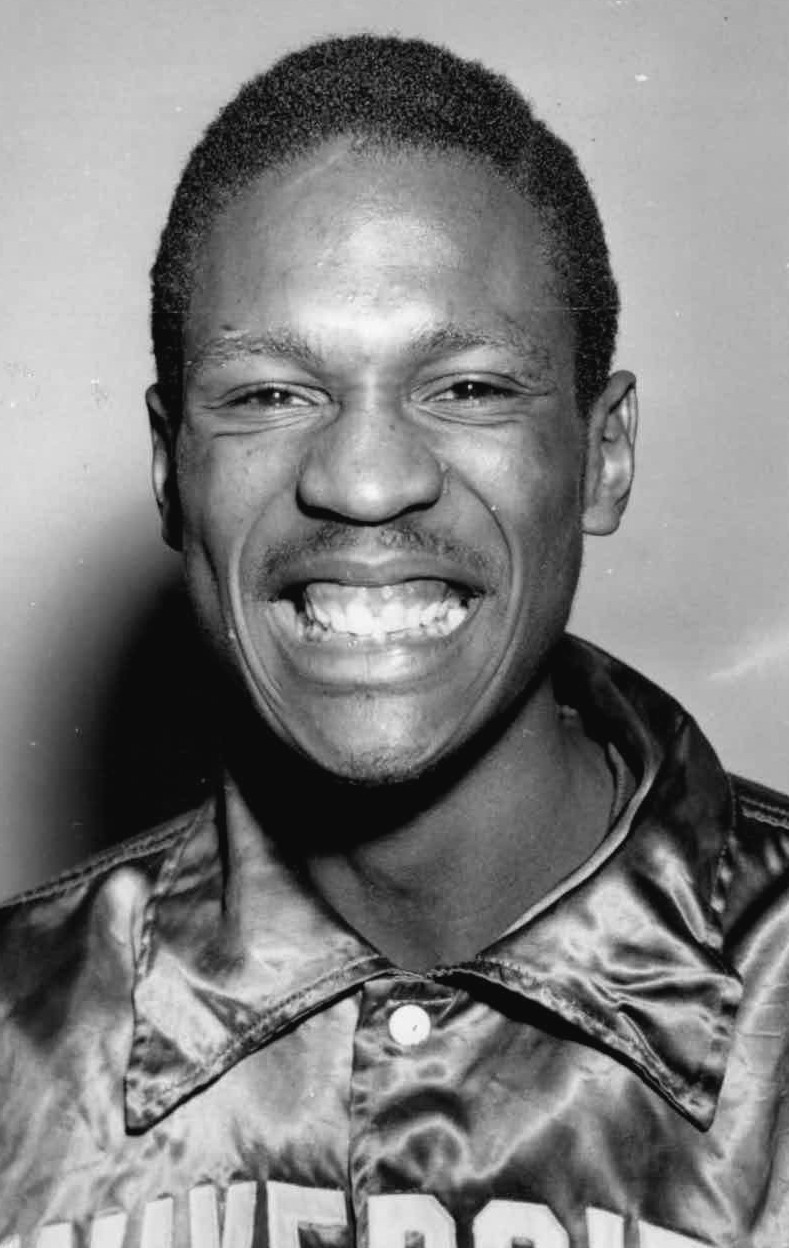
Russell during his college career at USF, 1955

The games were often difficult for the USF squad, as Russell and his black teammates became targets of racist jeers, particularly on the road. In one incident, hotels in Oklahoma City refused to admit Russell and his black teammates while they were in town for the 1954 All-College Tournament. In protest, the whole team decided to fend for themselves in a closed college dorm, which was later called an important bonding experience for the group. Decades later, Russell explained that his experiences hardened him against abuse of all kinds, saying: "I never permitted myself to be a victim."

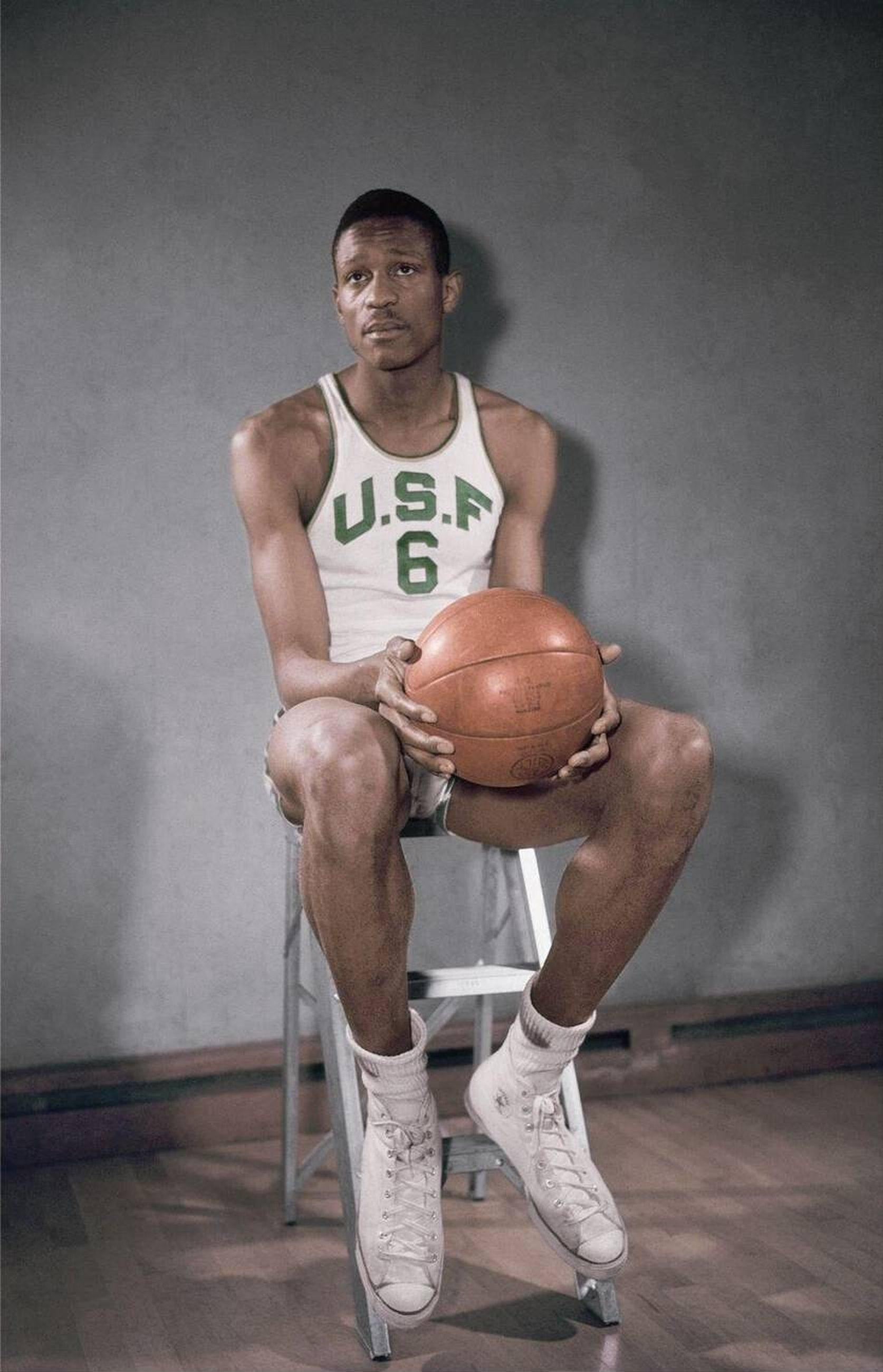
Russell in February 1956 at USF

Racism shaped his lifelong paradigm as a team player, about which Russell said: "At that time it was never acceptable that a black player was the best. That did not happen ... My junior year in college, I had what I thought was one of the best college seasons ever. We won 28 out of 29 games. We won the National Championship. I was the MVP at the Final Four. I was first team All American. I averaged over 20 points and over 20 rebounds, and I was the only guy in college blocking shots. So after the season was over, they had a Northern California banquet, and they picked another center as Player of the Year in Northern California. Well, that let me know that if I were to accept these as the final judges of my career I would die a bitter old man." He is said to have made a conscious decision to put the team first and foremost, and not worry about individual achievements.

On the court, Russell's experiences were far more pleasant. He led USF to NCAA championships in 1955 and 1956, including a string of 55 consecutive victories, and a 26-point, 27-rebound, 20-block performance in one game. He became known for his strong defense and shot-blocking skills, once denying 13 shots in a game. UCLA Bruins coach John Wooden called Russell "the greatest defensive man I've ever seen". While at USF, he and Jones helped pioneer a play that later became known as the alley-oop. During his college career, Russell was the NCAA tournament MOP in 1955, averaging 20.7 points per game and 20.3 rebounds per game.

==== Track and field ====
Besides basketball, Russell represented USF in track and field events. He was a standout in the high jump and according to Track & Field News was ranked the seventh-best high-jumper in the world in 1956, his graduation year, despite not competing in Olympic high-jump competition. That year, Russell won high jump titles at the Central California Amateur Athletic Union (AAU) meet, the Pacific AAU meet, and the West Coast Relays (WCR). One of his highest jumps occurred at the WCR, where he achieved a mark of 6 feet 9 1/4 inches (2.06 m); at the meet, Russell tied Charlie Dumas, who would later in the year win gold in the 1956 Summer Olympics in Melbourne, Australia for the United States and become the first person to high-jump 7 feet (2.13 m). This was all before the Fosbury Flop was introduced, with which all high jump world records after 1978 have been set. Russell later stated that "In '56, I could have made the Olympics in high jump but turned it down to play basketball instead, we could only play one sport then". He also competed in the 440 yards (402.3 m) race, which he could complete in 49.6 seconds.

== 1956 Summer Olympics ==
Before his NBA rookie year, Russell was the captain of the 1956 U.S. men's Olympic basketball team that competed at the 1956 Summer Olympics, which was held in November and December in Melbourne, Australia. Avery Brundage, head of the International Olympic Committee, argued that Russell had already signed a professional contract and was no longer an amateur (as nominally required at the time), but Russell prevailed. He had the option to skip the tournament and play a full season for the Celtics, but he was determined to play in the Olympics. He later commented that he would have participated in the high jump if he had been snubbed by the basketball team.

Under head coach Gerald Tucker, Russell helped the U.S. national basketball team win the gold medal in Melbourne, defeating the Soviet Union national basketball team 89–55 in the final game with an 8–0 undefeated run. The U.S. dominated the tournament, winning by an average of 53.5 points per game. Russell led the team in scoring, averaging 14.1 points per game for the competition. His former USF and future Celtics teammate K. C. Jones joined him on the Olympic squad and contributed 10.9 points per game, including a Russell–Jones combined 29 points in the finals.

== Professional career ==
The Harlem Globetrotters invited Russell to join their exhibition basketball squad, but Russell, who was sensitive to racial prejudice, was enraged by the fact that Globetrotters owner Abe Saperstein would only discuss the matter with USF Coach Woolpert, and not Russell. While Saperstein spoke to Woolpert in a meeting, Globetrotters assistant coach Harry Hanna tried to entertain Russell with jokes, but he was livid after this snub and declined the offer. He reasoned that if Saperstein was too smart to speak with him, then he was too smart to play for Saperstein. Russell made himself eligible for the 1956 NBA draft.

In the draft, Boston Celtics coach Red Auerbach set his sights on Russell, thinking his defensive toughness and rebounding prowess were the missing pieces the Celtics needed. Auerbach's thoughts were unorthodox, as in that period centers and forwards were defined by their offensive output, and their ability to play defense was secondary. Boston's chances of getting Russell seemed slim because they had finished second in the previous season and the worst teams had the highest draft picks, and the Celtics had slipped too low in the draft order to pick Russell. In addition, Auerbach had already used his NBA territorial pick to acquire talented forward Tom Heinsohn. Auerbach knew that the Rochester Royals, who owned the first draft pick, already had a strong rebounder in Maurice Stokes, were looking for an outside shooting guard, and were unwilling to pay Russell the $25,000 signing bonus he requested. Celtics owner Walter A. Brown contacted Rochester owner Les Harrison and received an assurance that the Royals could not afford Russell, and they would draft Sihugo Green. Auerbach later said that Brown offered Harrison guaranteed performances of the Ice Capades if they did not draft Russell; it is difficult to verify or disprove this, but it is clear that the Royals underrated Russell.

The St. Louis Hawks, who owned the second pick, drafted Russell but were vying for Celtics center Ed Macauley, a six-time NBA All-Star who had roots in St. Louis. Auerbach agreed to trade Macauley, who had previously asked to be traded to St. Louis to be with his sick son, if the Hawks gave up Russell. The owner of the Hawks called Auerbach later and demanded more in the trade. In addition to Macauley, who was the Celtics' premier player at the time, he wanted Cliff Hagan, who had been serving in the military for three years and had not yet played for the Celtics. After much debate, Auerbach agreed to give up Hagan and the Hawks made the trade. During that same draft, Boston also drafted guard K. C. Jones, Russell's former USF teammate; in total, the team drafted three future Basketball Hall of Famers in 1956: Russell, Jones, and Heinsohn. The Russell draft-day trade was later called one of the most important trades in the history of North American sports.

=== Boston Celtics (1956–1969) ===
==== 1956–1958: Rookie champion and early years ====
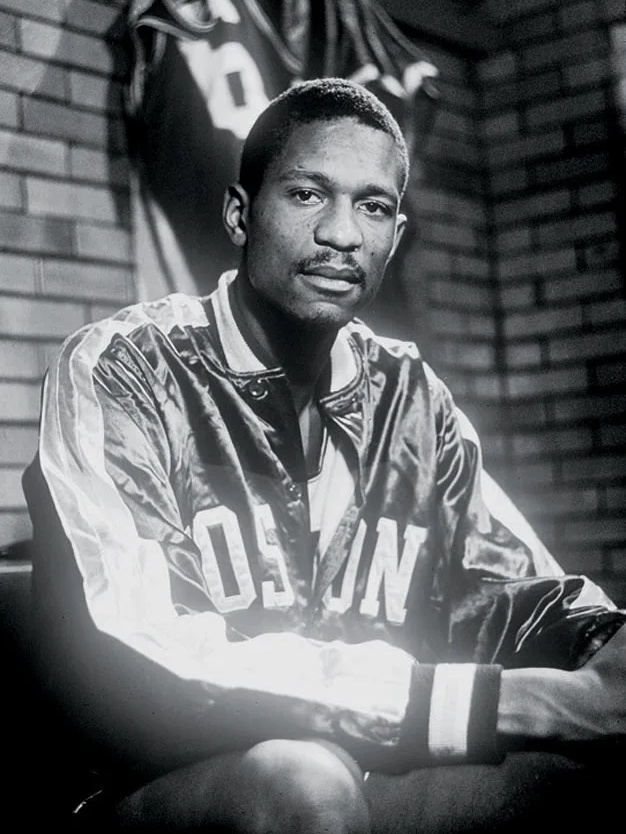
Russell in 1957

Due to his Olympic commitment, Russell could not join the Celtics for the 1956–57 NBA season until December. The 1956–57 Boston Celtics season saw the debut of a starting lineup made up of five future Hall-of-Famers: center Russell, forwards Heinsohn and Frank Ramsey, and guards Bill Sharman and Bob Cousy. Russell's first Celtics game came on December 22, 1956, against the St. Louis Hawks. Auerbach assigned him to shut down the Hawks' main scorer, Bob Pettit, and Russell impressed the Boston crowd with his man-to-man defense and shot-blocking. In previous years, the Celtics had been a high-scoring team but lacked the defensive presence needed to close out tight games. With the added defensive presence of Russell, the Celtics had laid the foundation for a dynasty, as the team utilized a strong defensive approach to the game, forcing opposing teams to commit many turnovers, which led to many easy points on fast breaks.

Russell was an elite help defender who allowed the Celtics to play the "Hey, Bill" defense: whenever a Celtic requested additional defensive help, he would shout "Hey, Bill!" Russell was so quick that he could run over for a quick double team and make it back in time if the opponents tried to find the open man. He also became famous for his shot-blocking skills and pundits called his blocks "Wilsonburgers", referring to the Wilson NBA basketballs he "shoved back into the faces of opposing shooters". This skill allowed the other Celtics to play their men aggressively; if they were beaten, they knew that Russell was guarding the basket.

Russell's defense was called into question by Eddie Gottlieb, coach of the Philadelphia Warriors, after the Warriors–Celtics game on January 1, 1957, in which he recorded 17 points and 25 rebounds, plus an assist. Gottlieb protested the next day, saying that Russell played a one-man zone and goaltended numerous times, to only be called once. Auerbach replied that Gottlieb's statements were "absolutely ridiculous" and said any controversy was "a question of sour grapes".

Constantly provoked by New York Knicks center Ray Felix during a game, he complained to coach Auerbach, who told him to take matters into his own hands. After the next provocation, Russell pounded Felix to the point of unconsciousness, paid a modest $25 fine, and rarely was the target of cheap fouls thereafter.

At that time, Russell received much negative publicity as a player. He was notorious for his public surliness. Because Russell ignored virtually any well-wisher who approached him home or away, as well as the vast majority of media, his autograph was among the most difficult to secure of any professional athlete of his time. Russell had a cordial relationship with many of his teammates, with the notable exception of Heinsohn, his old rival and fellow rookie. Russell ignored Heinsohn's request for an autograph on behalf of his cousin and openly said to Heinsohn that he deserved half of his $300 Rookie of the Year check. The relationship between the two was tenuous at best. Despite their different ethnic backgrounds and lack of common off-court interests, his relationship with Cousy was amicable.

Russell played 48 games, averaging 14.7 points per game and a league-high 19.6 rebounds per game. The Celtics finished the 1956–57 regular season with a 44–28 record, the team's second-best record since beginning play in the 1946–47 BAA season, which guaranteed Russell his first NBA playoffs appearance, where the Celtics met with the Syracuse Nationals, a team led by Dolph Schayes, through the Eastern Division finals. In his first playoff game, Russell finished with 16 points and 31 rebounds, along with 7 reported blocks, which were not yet an officially registered statistic. After the Celtics' 108–89 victory, Schayes, who made Johnny Kerr come off the bench because he struggled against Russell in the regular season, quipped: "How much does that guy make a year? It would be to our advantage if we paid him off for five years to get away from us in the rest of this series." The next day, The Boston Globe read: "Russell's Reflexes Befuddles Visitors."

The Celtics swept the Nationals in three games to earn the franchise's first NBA Finals appearance in the 1957 NBA Finals, where they met the St. Louis Hawks, led by Pettit and former Celtic Ed Macauley. As the teams split the first six games, the tension was so high that in Game 3 Celtics coach Auerbach punched his colleague Ben Kerner and received a $300 fine. In the highly-competitive Game 7, Russell tried his best to slow down Pettit, as Heinsohn scored 37 points and kept the Celtics alive; Russell contributed by completing the famous "Coleman Play", as he ran down Hawks forward Jack Coleman, who had received an outlet pass at midcourt, and blocked his shot despite the fact that Russell had been standing at his own baseline when the ball was thrown to Coleman. The block preserved Boston's slim 103–102 lead with 40-odd seconds left to play in regulation, saving the game for the Celtics. In the second overtime, both teams were in serious foul trouble: Heinsohn had fouled out, and the Hawks were so depleted that they had only seven players left. With the Celtics leading 125–123 with one second left, the Hawks had the ball at their own baseline. Reserve forward Alex Hannum threw a long alley-oop pass to Pettit and Pettit's tip-in rolled indecisively on the rim for several seconds before rolling out again. The Celtics won, earning their first NBA championship.

At the start of the 1957–58 NBA season, the Celtics won fourteen straight games and continued to succeed. Russell averaged 16.6 points per game and a league-record average of 22.7 rebounds per game. The NBA reasoned that other centers were better all-round players than Russell but no player was more valuable to his team. He was voted the NBA Most Valuable Player but only named to the All-NBA Second Team, something that would occur repeatedly throughout his career, as players voted for the MVP award, something that would last until the 1979–80 NBA season, while the media has always voted for the All-NBA teams.

The Celtics won 49 games and made the first berth in the 1958 NBA playoffs, where they met in the 1958 NBA Finals with their familiar rivals, the St. Louis Hawks. The teams split the first two games, but Russell went down with a foot injury in Game 3 and only returned for Game 6. The Celtics won Game 4 in an upset, but the Hawks prevailed in Games 5 and 6, with Pettit scoring 50 points in the deciding Game 6. Many observers thought that Boston could have won had Russell not been injured, but Auerbach commented: "You can always look for excuses ... We just got beat."

==== 1958–1966: Eight straight NBA championships ====
In the 1958–59 NBA season, Russell averaged 16.7 points per game and 23.0 rebounds per game. The Celtics broke a league record by winning 52 games and Russell's strong performance once again helped lead the Celtics through the 1959 NBA playoffs, as they returned to the NBA Finals. In the 1959 NBA Finals, the Celtics recaptured the NBA title, sweeping the Minneapolis Lakers 4–0. Lakers head coach John Kundla praised Russell, stating: "We don't fear the Celtics without Bill Russell. Take him out and we can beat them ... He's the guy who whipped us psychologically."

In the 1959–60 NBA season, the NBA witnessed the debut of 7 ft 1 in (2.16 m) Philadelphia Warriors center Wilt Chamberlain, who averaged a record 37.6 points per game in his rookie year. On November 7, 1959, Russell's Celtics hosted Chamberlain's Warriors and pundits called the matchup between the best offensive and defensive centers "The Big Collision" and "Battle of the Titans". Both men awed onlookers with "nakedly awesome athleticism", and while Chamberlain outscored Russell 30 to 22, the Celtics won 115–106, and the match was called a "new beginning of basketball". The matchup between Russell and Chamberlain became one of basketball's greatest rivalries.

On February 5, 1960, Russell had 23 points, 51 rebounds, and 5 assists in a 124–100 win over the Syracuse Nationals. It was the record for most rebounds in a single game until November 24, 1960, when Chamberlain grabbed 55 rebounds against Russell, who led the Celtics to a 132–129 win over the Philadelphia Warriors with 18 points, 19 rebounds, and 5 assists. Boston won a then-record 59 regular-season games, including a then-record tying 17-game win streak. In the 1960 NBA playoffs, Russell's Celtics met Chamberlain's Warriors in the Eastern Division finals. Chamberlain outscored Russell by 81 points in the series, but the Celtics walked off with a 4–2 series win. In the 1960 NBA Finals, the Celtics outlasted the Hawks 4–3 in the series and won their third championship in four years. Russell scored 21 points and grabbed an NBA Finals-record 40 rebounds, plus an assist, in a Game 2 loss, and he added 22 points and 35 rebounds, along with 4 assists, in the deciding Game 7, a 122–103 victory for Boston.

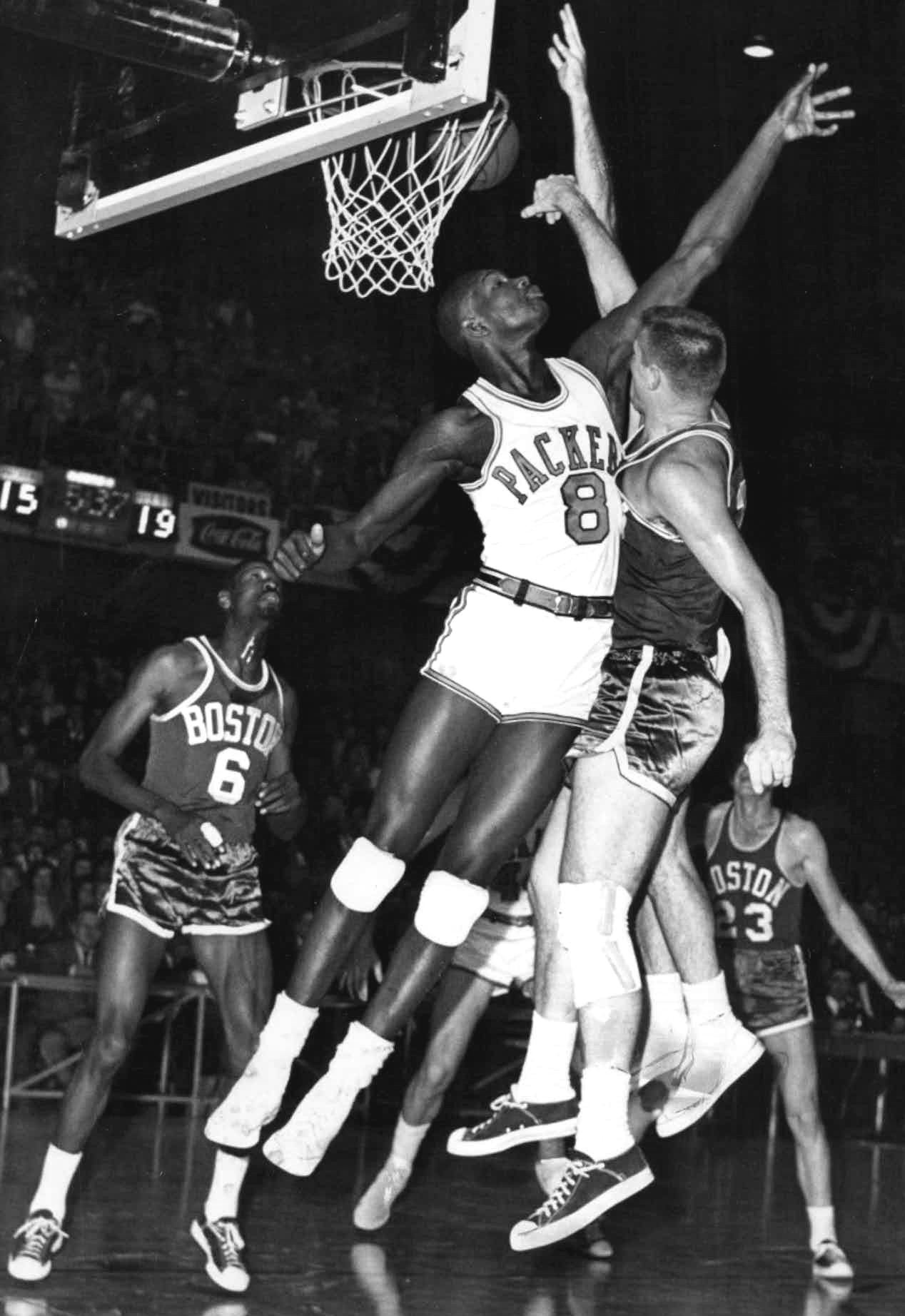
Russell (first from left) watches as Chicago Packers player Walt Bellamy attempts to block Tommy Heinsohn in a 1961 game

In the 1960–61 NBA season, Russell averaged 16.9 points and 23.9 rebounds per game, leading his team to a regular season mark of 57–22. In the 1961 NBA playoffs, the Celtics defeated the Syracuse Nationals 4–1 in the Eastern Division finals. The Celtics made good use of the fact that the Los Angeles Lakers had exhausted the St. Louis Hawks in a long seven-game Western Conference finals, and Boston won the 1961 NBA Finals in five games.

In the 1961–62 NBA season, Russell scored a career-high 18.9 points per game, accompanied by 23.6 rebounds per game. While his rival had a record-breaking season of 50.4 points per game, including Chamberlain's 100-point game, the Celtics became the first team to win 60 games in a season and Russell was voted as the league's MVP. Both Cousy and Russell called it the greatest Celtics team of all time. In the Eastern Division championships of the 1962 NBA playoffs, the Celtics met the Philadelphia Warriors led by Chamberlain, who averaged 50 points per game that season, and Russell did his best to slow him down. In the pivotal Game 7, Russell managed to hold Chamberlain to 22 points, 28 points below his season average, while scoring 19 points. The game was tied with two seconds left when Sam Jones sank a clutch shot that won the Celtics the series.

In the 1962 NBA Finals, the Celtics met the Los Angeles Lakers of forward Elgin Baylor and guard Jerry West. The teams split the first six games. In Game 6, Russell recorded his first career triple-double with 19 points, 24 rebounds, and 10 assists as the Celtics won 119–105. At that time, he became the fourth player in Celtics history to have a triple-double, joining Macauley, Cousy, and K. C. Jones. Game 7 was tied one second before the end of regular time, when Lakers guard Rod Hundley faked a shot and passed out to Frank Selvy, who missed an open eight-foot last-second shot that would have won Los Angeles the title. As the game was tied, Russell had the daunting task of defending against Baylor with little frontline help: Loscutoff, Heinsohn, and Satch Sanders, the three best Celtics forwards, had fouled out. In overtime, Frank Ramsey, the fourth forward, fouled out trying to guard Baylor, so Russell was robbed of his usual four-men wing rotation; he and little-used fifth forward Gene Guarilia successfully pressured Baylor into missed shots. Russell finished with a clutch performance, scoring 30 points, along with 4 assists, and tying his own NBA Finals record with 40 rebounds in a 110–107 overtime win.

The Celtics lost Cousy to retirement after the 1962–63 NBA season, and they drafted John Havlicek and were powered by Russell, who averaged 16.8 points and 23.6 rebounds per game, won his fourth regular-season MVP award, and earned the NBA All-Star Game MVP honors at the 1963 NBA All-Star Game following his 19-point, 24-rebound performance for the Eastern Conference's All-Star team. Before the January 31, 1963, 18-point, 22-rebound performance in a 128–125 win against the Cincinnati Royals at Cole Field House in College Park, Maryland, the Celtics were to tour the White House and Russell had a "Do not disturb" sign on his phone. Auerbach had informed his players to not endorse candidates or causes, as it would alienate fans; Cousy campaigned for Ted Kennedy in 1962. President John F. Kennedy posed for a picture with Auerbach and the nine Celtics but not Russell, who overslept because he thought it was just a tour of the White House and did not know President Kennedy would be meeting them. On February 10, 1963, Russell recorded his first regular season triple-double after putting up 17 points, 19 rebounds, and 10 assists in a 129–123 win over the New York Knicks. The Celtics reached the 1963 NBA Finals, where they again defeated the Los Angeles Lakers, this time in six games. In Game 3, Russell had 21 points, 38 rebounds, and 6 assists.

In the 1963–64 NBA season, the Celtics posted a league-best 58–22 record in the regular season. Russell scored 15.0 points per game and grabbed a career-high 24.7 rebounds per game, leading the NBA in rebounds for the first time since Chamberlain entered the league. Boston defeated the Cincinnati Royals 4–1 to earn another NBA Finals appearance and then won against Chamberlain's newly relocated San Francisco Warriors 4–1. It was their sixth consecutive and seventh title in Russell's eight years with the team, a streak unreached in any U.S. professional sports league. Russell later called it the best team of his era and the best defense of all time.

In the 1964–65 NBA season, the Celtics won a league-record 62 games and Russell averaged 14.1 points and 24.1 rebounds per game, winning his second consecutive rebounding title and his fifth MVP award. On March 11, 1965, in a 112–100 win over the Detroit Pistons, Russell grabbed 49 rebounds, which tied for the third-most in a single game in NBA history, along with 27 points and 6 assists.

In the 1965 NBA playoffs, the Celtics played the Eastern Division finals against the Philadelphia 76ers, a team that had traded for Chamberlain. Russell held Chamberlain to a pair of field goals in the first three quarters of Game 3. In Game 5, Russell contributed with 12 points, 28 rebounds, and 7 assists, plus 10 blocks and 6 steals; blocks and steals became officially recorded statistics in the 1973–74 NBA season. Schayes, who had become the 76ers coach, said: "The Celtics can thank the Good Lord for Bill Russell." That playoff series ended in a dramatic Game 7, when the Sixers were trailing 110–109 five seconds before the end, but Russell turned over the ball. When the Sixers' Hall-of-Fame guard Hal Greer inbounded, Havlicek stole the ball, causing Celtics commentator Johnny Most to scream: "Havlicek stole the ball! It's all over! Johnny Havlicek stole the ball!" After the Division finals, the Celtics had an easier time in the NBA Finals, winning 4–1 against the Los Angeles Lakers.

In the 1965–66 NBA season, Russell contributed 12.9 points and 22.8 rebounds per game. This was the first time in seven years that he failed to average at least 23 rebounds a game. The Celtics won the 1966 NBA Finals and their eighth consecutive title. Russell's team again beat Chamberlain's Philadelphia 76ers 4–1 in the Eastern Division finals, proceeding to win the NBA Finals in a tight showdown against the Los Angeles Lakers, with Russell scoring 25 points and grabbing 32 rebounds, plus giving out an assist, in a 95–93 win in Game 7.

==== 1966–1969: Player-coach champion and final seasons ====
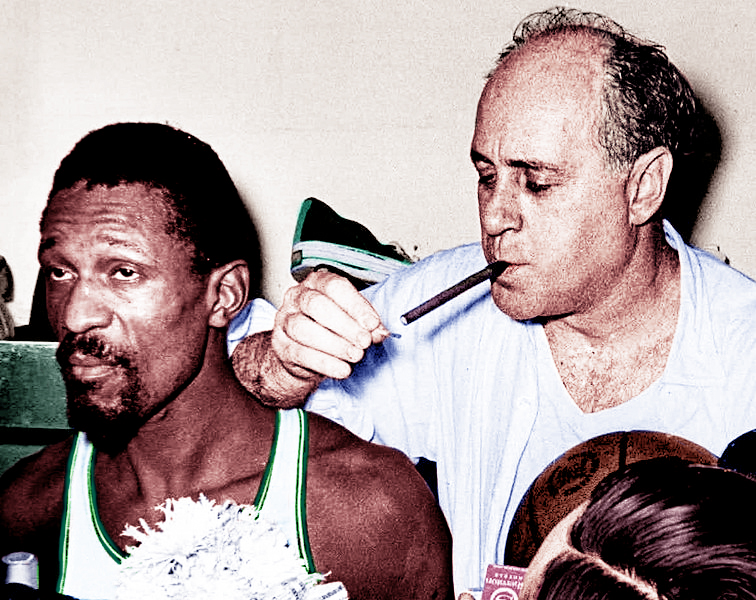
Russell and coach Red Auerbach, with his trademark victory cigar, after winning the 1966 NBA championship

Celtics coach Red Auerbach retired before the 1966–67 NBA season. To coach the Celtics, he had initially wanted his old player Frank Ramsey, who was too occupied running his three lucrative nursing homes. His second choice was Cousy, who declined the invitation, stating that he did not want to coach his former teammates. Third choice Tom Heinsohn also said no because he did not think he could handle the often surly Russell, whom he proposed as a player-coach. On April 16, 1966, Russell agreed to become head coach of the Celtics, and a public announcement was made two days later. Russell became the first black head coach in NBA history, and he commented to journalists: "I wasn't offered the job because I am a Negro, I was offered it because Red figured I could do it."

When he became player-coach, Russell bluntly said to his teammates that "he intended to cut all personal ties to other players" and seamlessly made the transition from their peer to their superior. At the time his additional role of coach was announced, Russell publicly stated he believed Red Auerbach's impact as a coach confined every or almost every relationship with each Celtic player to a strictly professional one. Russell regarded Auerbach as "the greatest of all coaches".

Boston's championship streak ended at eight in his first full season as head coach when Chamberlain's Philadelphia 76ers won a record-breaking 68 regular-season games and were the favorites heading into the 1967 NBA playoffs, where they beat the Celtics 4–1 in the Eastern Division finals. During the series, Russell said: "Right now, he (Wilt) is playing like me [to win]." The Sixers outpaced the Celtics when they shredded the famed Boston defense by scoring 140 points in the clinching Game 5 win. Russell acknowledged the first real loss of his career, as he had been injured when the Celtics lost the 1958 NBA Finals, by visiting Chamberlain in the locker room, shaking his hand, and saying: "Great." The game still ended on a high note for Russell. After the loss, he led his grandfather through the Celtics locker rooms and the two saw the white Celtic Havlicek taking a shower next to his black teammate Sam Jones and discussing the game. Suddenly, his grandfather broke down crying. Asked by Russell what was wrong, his grandfather replied how proud he was of him, being coach of an organization in which blacks and whites coexisted in harmony. It would be the only time in Russell's career that the Celtics did not play for the NBA title.

In the 1967–68 NBA season, the 34-year-old Russell averaged 12.5 points per game and 18.6 rebounds per game, the latter of which was good enough for the third-highest average in the league. In the Eastern Division finals of the 1968 NBA playoffs, the Philadelphia 76ers had the better record than Boston and were the favorites. National tragedy struck on April 4, day of the assassination of Martin Luther King Jr. With eight of the ten starting players on Sixers and Celtics being black, both teams were in deep shock and there were calls to cancel the series. In a game called as "unreal" and "devoid of emotion", the Sixers lost 127–118 on April 5. In Game 2, Philadelphia evened the series with a 115–106 win and then went on to win Games 3 and 4. As Chamberlain was often defended by Celtics backup center Wayne Embry, the press speculated that Russell was worn down. Prior to Game 5, no NBA team had ever come back from a 3–1 deficit. The Celtics rallied back, winning Game 5 122–104 and Game 6 114–106, powered by a spirited Havlicek and helped by a terrible Sixers shooting slump.

In Game 7, 15,202 Philadelphia fans witnessed a home-team 100–96 defeat, making it the first time in NBA history a team lost a series after leading 3–1. Russell limited Chamberlain to only two shot attempts in the second half. Despite this, the Celtics were leading only 97–95 with 34 seconds left when Russell closed out the game with several consecutive clutch plays. He made a free throw, blocked a shot by Sixers player Chet Walker, grabbed a rebound off a miss by Greer, and passed the ball to teammate Sam Jones, who scored to clinch the win. Boston then beat the Los Angeles Lakers 4–2 in the 1968 NBA Finals, giving Russell his tenth title in twelve years. For his efforts, Russell was named Sports Illustrated's Sportsman of the Year. After losing for the fifth straight time against Russell and the Celtics, Hall-of-Fame Lakers guard Jerry West stated: "If I had a choice of any basketball player in the league, my No. 1 choice has to be Bill Russell. Bill Russell never ceases to amaze me."

During the 1968–69 NBA season, Russell was shocked by the assassination of Robert F. Kennedy, disillusioned by the Vietnam War, and weary from his increasingly stale marriage to his wife Rose; the couple later divorced. He was convinced that the U.S. was a corrupt nation and that he was wasting his time playing something as superficial as basketball. He was 15 pounds overweight, skipped mandatory NBA coach meetings, and was generally lacking energy; after a New York Knicks game, he complained of intense pain and was diagnosed with acute exhaustion. Russell pulled himself together and put up 9.9 points and 19.3 rebounds per game; the aging Celtics stumbled through the regular season. Their 48–34 record was the team's worst since the 1955–56 NBA season and they entered the 1969 NBA playoffs as the fourth-seeded team in the East.

Russell and the Celtics achieved upsets over the 76ers and the Knicks to earn a meeting with the Los Angeles Lakers in the 1969 NBA Finals. The Lakers featured new recruit Chamberlain next to perennial stars Baylor and West, and were the favorites. In the first two games, Russell ordered his players not to double-team West, who used the freedom to score 53 and 41 points in the Game 1 and 2 Laker wins. Russell then reversed himself and ordered his team to double-team West and Boston won Game 3. In Game 4, the Celtics were trailing by one point with seven seconds left and the Lakers had the ball until Baylor stepped out of bounds. In the last play, Sam Jones used a triple screen by Bailey Howell, Larry Siegfried, and Havlicek to hit a buzzer beater that equalized the series. The teams split the next two games and it all came down to Game 7 in Los Angeles, where Lakers owner Jack Kent Cooke angered and motivated the Celtics by putting "proceedings of Lakers victory ceremony" on the game leaflets. Russell used a copy as extra motivation and told his team to play a running game because in that case it was not the better but the more determined team that was going to win.

The Celtics were ahead by nine points with five minutes remaining; in addition, West was limping after a Game 5 thigh injury and Chamberlain had left the game with an injured leg. West then hit one basket after the other and cut the lead to one, and Chamberlain asked to return to the game. Lakers coach Bill van Breda Kolff kept him on the bench until the end of the game, saying later that he wanted to stay with the lineup responsible for the comeback. The Celtics held on for a 108–106 victory and Russell claimed his eleventh championship in thirteen years. At age 35, Russell contributed with 6 points, 21 rebounds, and 6 assists in his last NBA game. After the game, Russell went over to the distraught West, who had scored 42 points and was named the only NBA Finals MVP in history from the losing team, clasped his hand and tried to soothe him.

Days later, 30,000 Celtics fans cheered their returning heroes. Russell, who once said he owed the public nothing, was not there; he abruptly retired and cut all ties to the Celtics. Russell's retirement was so surprising that Auerbach was blindsided and drafted guard Jo Jo White instead of a potential replacement for Russell at center. Although White became a standout Celtics player, the Celtics lacked an All-Star center. They fell to 34–48 in the 1969–70 NBA season and missed the playoffs altogether for the first time since 1950. In Boston, both fans and journalists felt betrayed because Russell left the Celtics without a coach and a center, and he sold his retirement story for $10,000 to Sports Illustrated. Russell was accused of selling out the future of the franchise for a month of his salary. Russell notified Auerbach that he was resigning to join a career in television and movies "in order to find new sources of income for the future".

=== Earnings ===
During his playing career, Russell was one of the first big earners in NBA basketball. His 1956 rookie contract was worth $24,000 (equivalent to $284,211 in 2025), only fractionally smaller than the $25,000 of top earner and teammate Bob Cousy. Russell never had to work part-time. This was in contrast to other Celtics who had to work during the offseason to maintain their standard of living; Tom Heinsohn sold insurance, Gene Guarilia was a professional guitar player, Cousy ran a basketball camp, and Red Auerbach invested in plastics and a Chinese restaurant. When Wilt Chamberlain became the first NBA player to earn $100,000 in salary in 1965 (equivalent to $1,021,647 in 2025), Russell went to Auerbach and demanded a $100,001 salary, which he promptly received. For his promotion to coach, the Celtics paid Russell an annual salary of $25,000, which was in addition to his salary as a player. Although the salary was touted in the press as a record for an NBA coach, it is unclear whether Russell's continued $100,001 salary as a player was included in the calculation. Russell also had a shoe designed by Bristol Manufacturing Corporation in 1966, the Bill Russell Professional Basketball Shoe.

=== Russell–Chamberlain relations ===
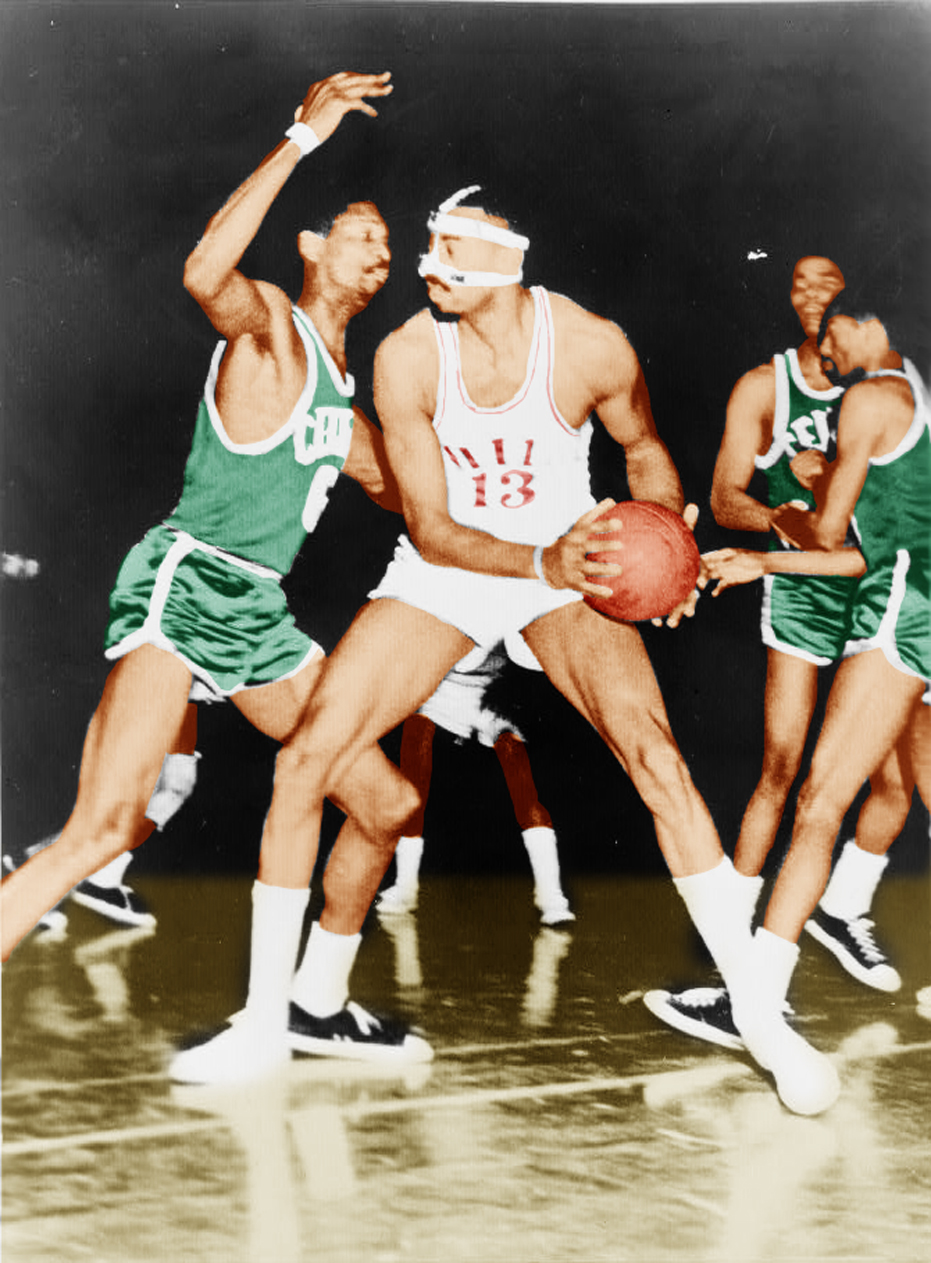
Russell defending Wilt Chamberlain in 1969

For most of his career, Russell and his perennial opponent Wilt Chamberlain were close friends. Chamberlain often invited Russell over for Thanksgiving dinner; at Russell's place, conversation mostly concerned Russell's electric trains. The close relationship ended after Game 7 of the 1969 NBA Finals, when Chamberlain injured his knee with six minutes left and was forced to leave the game. During a conversation with students, a reporter—unknown to Russell—heard Russell describe Chamberlain as a malingerer and accused him of "copping out" of the game when it seemed that the Lakers would lose. He was livid with Russell and saw him as a backstabber.

Chamberlain's knee was injured so badly that he could not play the entire offseason and he ruptured it the next season. The two men did not speak to each other for more than twenty years until Russell met with Chamberlain and personally apologized. After that, the two were often seen together at various events and interviewed as friends. When Chamberlain died in 1999, Chamberlain's nephew said that Russell was the second person he was told to call. In delivering a eulogy for Chamberlain, Russell stated that he did not consider them rivals, but rather to have a competition, and that the pair would "be friends through eternity".

Chamberlain outscored Russell 30 to 14.2 and outrebounded him 28.2 to 22.9 in the regular season, and he also outscored him 25.7 to 14.9 and outrebounded him 28 to 24.7 in the playoffs. Russell's Celtics went 57–37 in the regular season against Chamberlain's teams and 29–20 in the playoffs, Chamberlain's losing seven of the eight series.

=== Racist abuse, controversy, and relationship with Boston fans ===
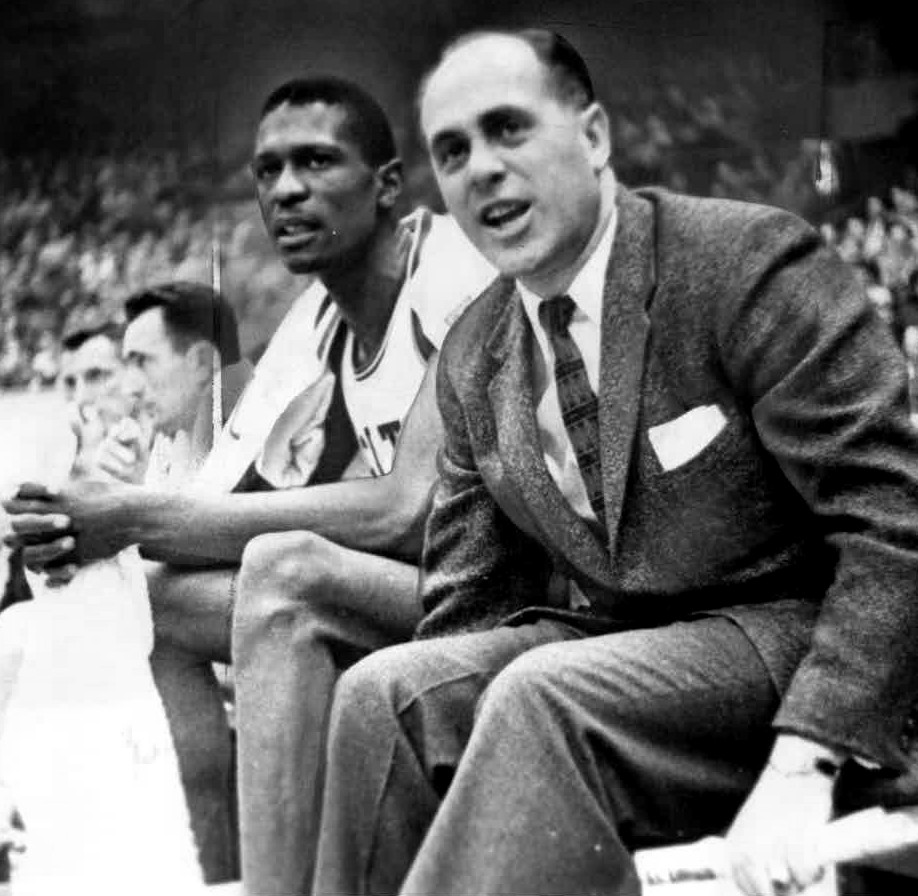
Russell with coach Red Auerbach in his rookie season, as they are seated on the sidelines. Auerbach refused to have a color barrier for the Celtics. Following his retirement in 1966, he handed off coaching duties to Russell as a player-coach.

Russell's life was marked by an uphill battle against racism and controversial actions and statements in response to racism. As a child, he witnessed how his parents were victims of racial abuse, and the family eventually moved into government housing projects to escape the daily torrent of bigotry. When he later became a standout college player at USF, Russell recalled how he and his few fellow black teammates were jeered by white students.

Even after he became a star with the Celtics, Russell was the victim of racial abuse. When the NBA All-Stars toured the U.S. in the 1958 offseason, white hotel owners in segregated North Carolina denied rooms to Russell and his black teammates, causing him to later write in his 1966 memoir Go Up for Glory: "It stood out, a wall which understanding cannot penetrate. You are a Negro. You are less. It covered every area. A living, smarting, hurting, smelling, greasy substance which covered you. A morass to fight from." Before the 1961–62 season, Russell's team was scheduled to play in an exhibition game in Lexington, Kentucky, when Russell and his black teammates were refused service at a local restaurant. As part of the 1961 Celtics boycott, he and the other black teammates refused to play in the exhibition game and flew home, drawing a great deal of controversy and publicity.

As a consequence of his endured racist abuse, Russell was extremely sensitive to all racial prejudice. According to sportswriter Taylor, in a 2005 book, Russell often perceived insults even if others did not. He was active in the Black Power movement and was among the African-American athletes and the one political leader who came together at the 1967 Cleveland Summit to support Muhammad Ali and his decision to refuse to be drafted. He was often called Felton X, presumably in the tradition of the Nation of Islam's practice of replacing a European slave name with an X, and purchased land in Liberia. Russell's public statements became increasingly militant, and he was quoted as saying: "I dislike most white people because they are people ... I like most blacks because I am black." Russell articulated these views with a measure of self-criticism, saying: "I consider this a deficiency in myself—maybe. If I looked at it objectively, detached myself, it would be a deficiency." When his white Celtics teammate Frank Ramsey asked whether he hated him, Russell stated that he had been misquoted but few believed it. According to Taylor, Russell discounted the fact that his career was facilitated by white people who were proven anti-racists: his high school coach George Powles, who encouraged him to play basketball, his college coach Phil Woolpert, who integrated USF basketball, Celtics coach Red Auerbach, who made him the first black NBA coach and is regarded as an anti-racist pioneer for his no color barrier, and Celtics owner Walter A. Brown, who gave him a high $24,000 rookie contract, just $1,000 shy of the top-earning veteran Bob Cousy.

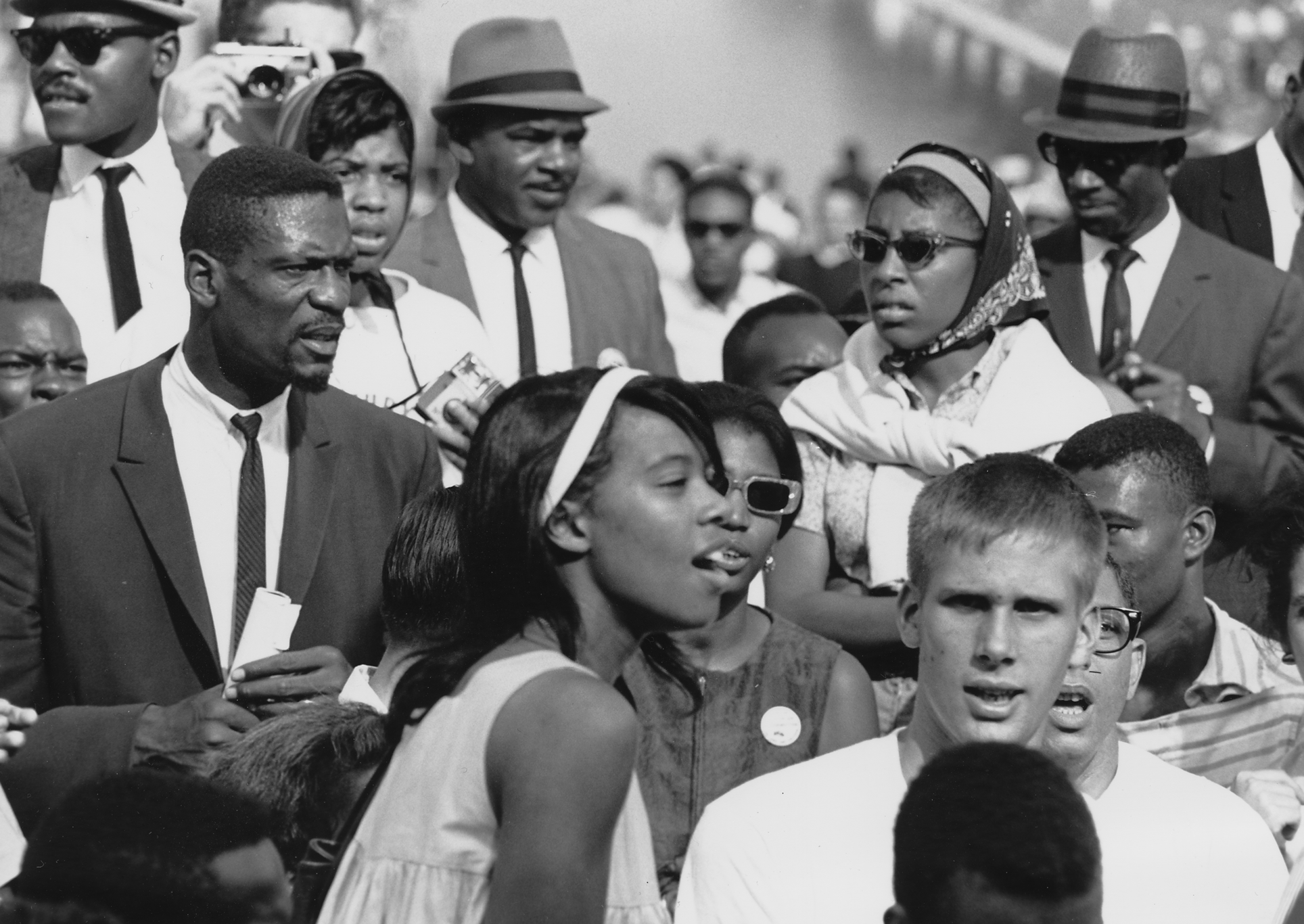
Russell attending a Civil Rights March on Washington, D.C., August 1963

In a 1963 article by Sports Illustrated, Russell said he had "never met a finer person [than George Powles] ... I owe so much to him it's impossible to express." Years after Taylor's book, Russell published the autobiographical account Red and Me, which chronicled his lifelong friendship with Auerbach. Of the book, Bill Bradley wrote for The New York Times Book Review that "Bill Russell is a private, complex man, but on the subject of his love of Red Auerbach and his Celtic teammates, he's loud and clear." In the book, Russell wrote: "Whenever I leave the Celtics locker room, even Heaven wouldn't be good enough because anywhere else is a step down ... With Red [Auerbach] and Walter Brown, I was the freest athlete on the planet. I could always be myself with them and they were always there for me." Describing the Celtics organization – distinguished from Boston sports fans in the 1950s and 1960s – as very progressive racially, Russell recalled in 2010 a list of the organization's accomplishments on racial progress both in terms of objective milestones and his own subjective experience as a member of the organization. He said:

The Celtics were the first [NBA basketball] team to draft a black player, period: a guy named Chuck Cooper from Duquesne. The first team to start five black players was the Boston Celtics. The first [NBA organization] to hire a black [head] coach was the Boston Celtics, and they've had at least five [black head-coaches] over the years.

And so the guy that owned the Celtics [Walter Brown] was [in addition to Auerbach for whom Russell expressed "respect" and "actual love"] another one of the fine, good, and decent human beings that I've ever encountered. When the Celtics drafted Chuck Cooper and they came into Washington, D.C., to sign his contract, Walter Brown the owner of the team walked up to him and said: "Mr. Cooper, the Boston Celtics will never embarrass you." That's the first thing Walter Brown said to Chuck Cooper. And that's the kind of guy [Brown] was.

And so the Celtics—all we looked for was: "Can he play?" And what we would do is—[Auerbach] trusted all his players—so like when he'd make a coaching decision, he could talk: he talked to [Bob] Cousy [who is white], he talked to me [black], he talked to [Bill] Sharman [white], he talked to Sam [Jones] [black]—all of us: "What do you think?" [Auerbach would] get the information from us and then make a decision based on that information and his thoughts. So we never, or at least I never, ever considered him as having ulterior motives for whatever he did.

In 1966, Russell was promoted to head coach of the Celtics. During a press conference, Russell was asked: "As the first Negro head coach in a major league sport, can you do the job impartially without any racial prejudice in reverse?" He replied: "Yes." When the reporter asked how, Russell responded: "Because the most important factor is respect. And in basketball I respect a man for his ability, period." As a result of repeated racial bigotry, Russell refused to respond to fan acclaim or friendship from his neighbors, thinking it was insincere and hypocritical. This attitude contributed to his bad rapport with fans and journalists. He alienated Celtics fans by saying: "You owe the public the same it owes you, nothing! I refuse to smile and be nice to the kiddies."

This supported the opinion of many white fans that Russell, who was by then the highest-paid Celtic, was egotistical, paranoid, and hypocritical. The already hostile atmosphere between Russell and Boston hit its apex when vandals broke into his house in Reading, Massachusetts, covered the walls with racist graffiti, damaged his trophies, and defecated in the beds. In response, Russell described Boston as a "flea market of racism". He was quoted as saying: "From my very first year I thought of myself as playing for the Celtics, not for Boston. The fans could do or think whatever they wanted." Referring to a time when the Celtics did not frequently sell out the Boston Garden, while the generally mediocre and all-white NHL Boston Bruins did, Russell recalled: "We [the Celtics] did a survey about what we could do to improve attendance. Over 50 percent of responses said 'There's too many black players.'" In retirement, Russell described the Boston press as corrupt and racist; in response, Boston sports journalist Larry Claflin claimed that Russell himself was the real racist. The FBI maintained a file on Russell and described him in their file as "an arrogant Negro who won't sign autographs for white children".

Russell refused to attend the ceremony when his jersey No. 6 was retired in 1972; he also refused to attend his induction into the Hall of Fame in 1975. While Russell long had sore feelings towards Boston, there was something of a reconciliation, and he visited the city regularly in his later years, something he never did in the years immediately after his retirement. On November 15, 2019, Russell accepted the Hall of Fame ring in a private ceremony with family. When Russell originally retired, he demanded that his jersey be retired in an empty Boston Garden.

In 1995, the Celtics left the Boston Garden and moved into the FleetCenter, now known as the TD Garden; as the main festive act, the Celtics wanted to re-retire Russell's jersey in front of a sellout audience. Perennially wary of what he long perceived as a racist city, Russell decided to make amends and gave his approval. On May 6, 1999, the Celtics re-retired Russell's jersey in a ceremony attended by his on-court rival and friend Chamberlain, along with Celtics legend Larry Bird and Hall of Famer Kareem Abdul-Jabbar. The crowd gave Russell a prolonged standing ovation, which brought tears to his eyes. He thanked Chamberlain for taking him to the limit and "making [him] a better player", and the crowd for "allowing [him] to be a part of their lives." In December 2008, the We Are Boston Leadership Award was presented to Russell.

== Post-playing career and endeavors ==
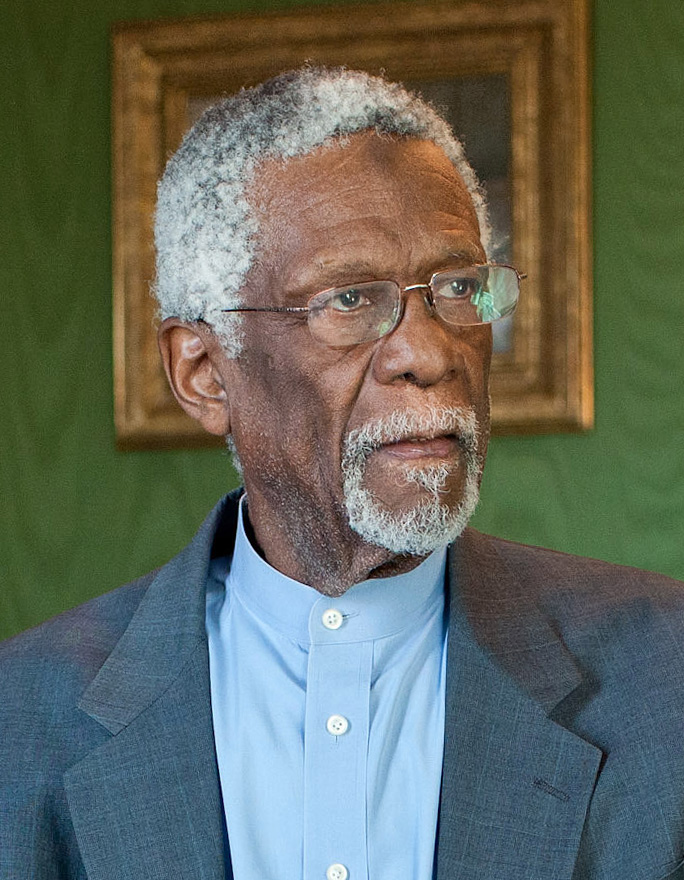
Russell at the White House in 2011

In 1971, Russell joined NBA on ABC to do commentary on the Game of the Week. His No. 6 jersey was retired by the Celtics on March 12, 1972, Russell had worn the same number 6 at the USF and for the 1956 U.S. Olympic team. He was inducted into the Naismith Memorial Basketball Hall of Fame in 1975. Russell, who had a difficult relationship with the media, did not attend either ceremony. He attended his 2021 induction into the Basketball Hall of Fame as a coach.

After retiring as a player, Russell had stints as head coach of the Seattle SuperSonics (1973–1977) and Sacramento Kings (1987–1988). His time as a non-playing coach was lackluster; he led the struggling SuperSonics into the playoffs for the first time in franchise history, but Russell's defensive, team-oriented Celtics mindset did not mesh well with the team, and he left in 1977 with a 162–166 record. Russell's stint with the Kings was considerably shorter, his last assignment ending when the Kings went 17–41 to begin the 1987–88 NBA season. He finished with a 341–290 regular season record and was 34–27 in the playoffs. Russell also served as general manager of the SuperSonics during his coaching tenure, and held the same position with the Kings during the 1988–89 season. In addition, Russell ran into financial trouble. He had invested $250,000 in a rubber plantation in Liberia, where he had wanted to spend his retirement, but it went bankrupt. The same fate awaited his Boston restaurant Slade's, after which he had to default on a $90,000 government loan to purchase the outlet. The Internal Revenue Service discovered that Russell owed $34,430 in tax money and put a lien on his house.

Russell became a vegetarian, took up golf, and worked as a color commentator for CBS and TBS throughout the 1970s into the mid-1980s, but he was uncomfortable as a broadcaster. He later said: "The most successful television is done in eight-second thoughts, and the things I know about basketball, motivation, and people go deeper than that." On November 3, 1979, Russell hosted Saturday Night Live, in which he appeared in several sports-related sketches. Russell also wrote books, usually written as a joint project with a professional writer, including 1979's Second Wind, and played Judge Roger Ferguson in the Miami Vice episode "The Fix" (aired March 7, 1986). In 1985, former Celtic teammate Don Chaney, who was head coach of the Los Angeles Clippers, asked Russell to tutor Benoit Benjamin, the third overall draft pick from Creighton University, who left after his junior season; according to Chaney, Russell did not get paid for it.

Russell made few public appearances in the early 1990s, living as a near-recluse on Mercer Island, Washington, near Seattle. Following Chamberlain's death in October 1999, Russell returned to prominence at the turn of the millennium. In 2001, Russell and David Falkner published Russell Rules: 11 Lessons on Leadership from the Twentieth Century's Greatest Winner. Russell convinced Miami Heat superstar center Shaquille O'Neal to bury the hatchet with fellow NBA superstar and former Los Angeles Lakers teammate Kobe Bryant and end the Shaq–Kobe feud in January 2006. On November 17, the two-time NCAA champion Russell was recognized for his impact on college basketball as a member of the founding class of the National Collegiate Basketball Hall of Fame. He was one of five, along with James Naismith, Oscar Robertson, Dean Smith, and John Wooden, selected to represent the inaugural class. On May 20, 2007, Russell was awarded an honorary doctorate by Suffolk University, where he served as its commencement speaker. Russell also received honorary degrees from Harvard University on June 7, 2007, and from Dartmouth College on June 14, 2009. On June 18, 2007, Russell was inducted as a member of the founding class of the FIBA Hall of Fame. In 2008, Russell received the Golden Plate Award of the Academy of Achievement.

On February 14, 2009, NBA Commissioner David Stern announced that the NBA Finals Most Valuable Player Award would be renamed the Bill Russell NBA Finals Most Valuable Player Award in his honor as an 11-time NBA champion. During halftime of the 2009 NBA All-Star Game, Celtics captains Ray Allen, Kevin Garnett, and Paul Pierce presented Russell a surprise birthday cake for his 75th birthday. Russell attended Game 5 of the 2009 NBA Finals to present Bryant the NBA Finals Most Valuable Player award. Russell was awarded the Presidential Medal of Freedom by President Barack Obama in 2011. Russell and Bryant were spectators to a basketball game for Obama's 50th birthday at the White House tennis court. The game featured Shane Battier, LeBron James, Magic Johnson, Maya Moore, Alonzo Mourning, Joakim Noah, Chris Paul, Derrick Rose, and Obama's friends from high school.

On September 26, 2017, Russell posted a photograph of himself to a previously unused Twitter account in which he was taking the knee in solidarity with the U.S. national anthem kneeling protests. Russell wore his Presidential Medal of Freedom and the image was captioned: "Proud to take a knee, and to stand tall against social injustice." In an interview with ESPN, Russell said he wanted the NFL players to know they were not alone.

== Accomplishments and legacy ==
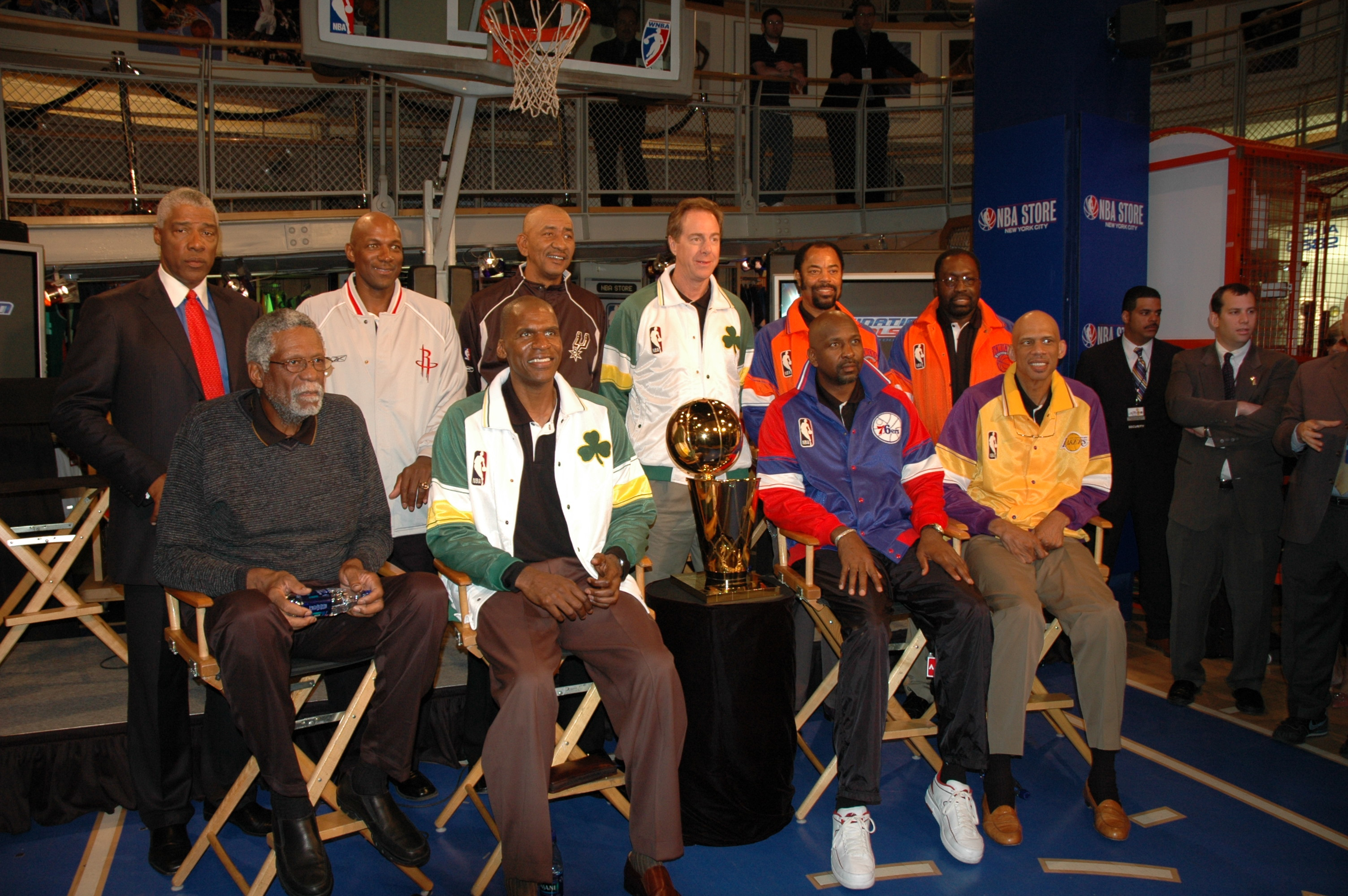
Russell (first from left, front row) posing along other former players with the Championship Trophy for the 2005 NBA Legends Tour

Russell is one of the most successful and decorated athletes in North American sports history. His awards and achievements include eleven NBA championships with the Boston Celtics in thirteen seasons, two of which were won as player-coach, and he is credited with having raised defensive play in the NBA to a new level. By winning the 1956 NCAA championship with USF and the 1957 NBA title with the Celtics, Russell became the first of only five players in basketball history to win an NCAA championship and an NBA championship in back-to-back seasons, the others being Henry Bibby, Magic Johnson, Billy Thompson, and Christian Braun. He also won two state championships in high school. In the interim, Russell won an Olympic gold medal in 1956. Russell was one of only eight players in the history of basketball to achieve the Triple Crown — winning an NCAA championship, NBA championship, and Olympic gold medal. His stint as coach of the Celtics was also of historical significance, as he became the first black head coach in the NBA, when he succeeded Red Auerbach.

In his first NBA full season (1957–58), Russell became the first player in NBA history to average more than 20 rebounds per game for an entire season, a feat he accomplished ten times in his thirteen seasons. He is one of just two NBA players (the other being Wilt Chamberlain) to have grabbed more than 50 rebounds in a game. He still holds the NBA record for rebounds in one half with 32 (vs. Philadelphia, November 16, 1957). Career-wise in rebounds, Russell ranks second to Chamberlain in regular season total (21,620) and average per game (22.5), and he led the NBA in average rebounds per game four times. As of 2024, Russell is the leader for most career rebounds, most minutes per game (42.3), and most rebounds per game in Celtics franchise history. Russell is the all-time playoff leader in total (4,104) and average (24.9) rebounds per game, he grabbed 40 rebounds in three separate playoff games (twice in the NBA Finals), and he never failed to average at least 20 rebounds per game in any of his thirteen playoff campaigns. Russell also had seven regular-season games with 40 or more rebounds, the NBA Finals record for highest rebound per game average (29.5, 1959) and by a rookie (22.9, 1957). In addition, Russell holds the NBA Finals single-game record for most rebounds (40, March 29, 1960, vs. St. Louis, and April 18, 1962, vs. Los Angeles), most rebounds in a quarter (19, April 18, 1962, vs. Los Angeles), and most consecutive games with 20 or more rebounds (15 from April 9, 1960 – April 16, 1963). He also had 51 in one game, 49 in two others, and twelve straight seasons of 1,000 or more rebounds. Russell was known as one of the most clutch players in the NBA. He played in eleven deciding games (ten times in Game 7s, once in a Game 5) and ended with a 11–0 record. In these eleven games, Russell averaged 18.3 points and 29.4 rebounds.

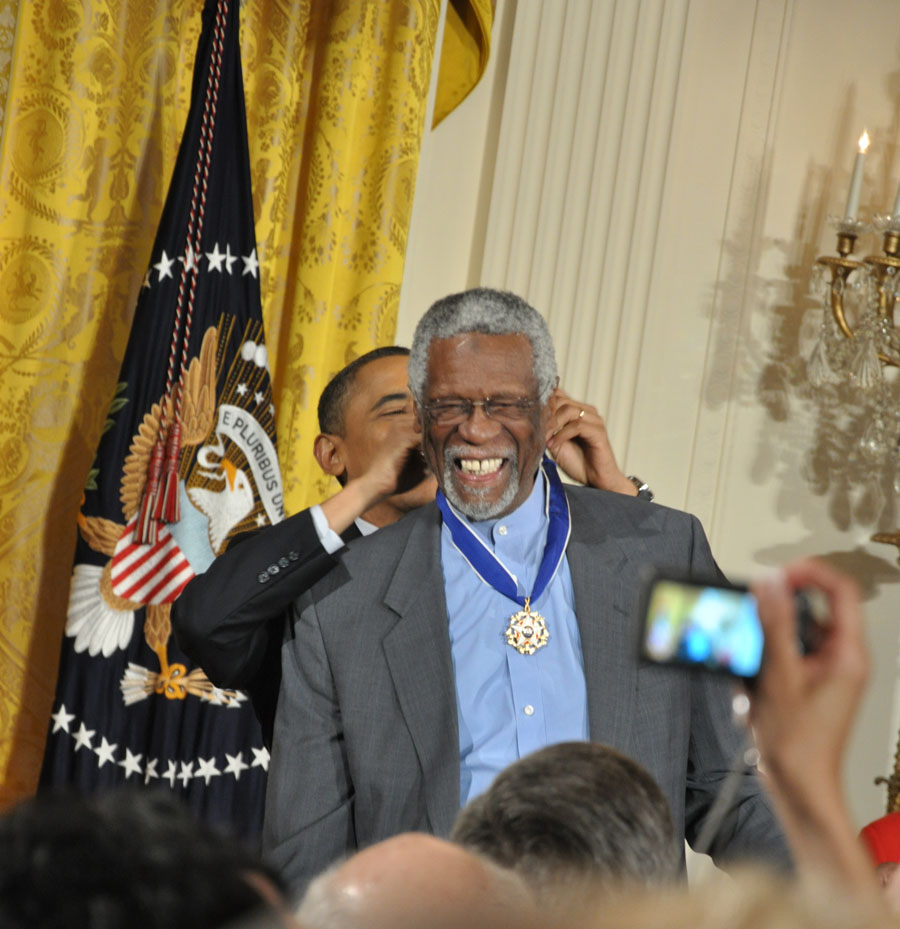
Russell being awarded the Medal of Freedom by President Barack Obama at the White House, February 2011

Russell was considered the consummate defensive center, noted for his defensive intensity, basketball IQ, and will to win. He excelled at playing man-to-man defense, blocking shots, and grabbing defensive rebounds. Chamberlain said Russell's timing as a shot-blocker was unparalleled. In 2009, Russell's erstwhile Knicks opponent Bill Bradley wrote in The New York Times Book Review that Russell "was the smartest player ever to play the game [of basketball]". He could score with putbacks and made mid-air outlet passes to point guard Bob Cousy for easy fast-break points. He was also known as a fine passer and pick-and-roll setter, featured a decent left-handed hook shot, and finished strong on alley oops. On offense, Russell's output was limited and his NBA career personal averages show him to be an average scorer (15.1 points career average), a poor free-throw shooter (56.1%), and average overall shooter from the field (44%, not exceptional for a center). In his thirteen years, he averaged a relatively low 13.4 field goals attempted (normally, top scorers average 20 and more), illustrating that he was never the focal point of the Celtics offense, who instead focused on his elite defense. He ranks No. 1 in NBA history for defensive win shares at 133.6, with Tim Duncan in second at 106.3. While blocked shots were not a recorded basketball statistic during Russell's career, he averaged 8.1 blocks in 135 games, as Boston writers often attempted to tally his blocks. Bill Simmons has estimated that Russell had between 8 and 15 blocks per game in the playoffs.

Russell was driven by "a neurotic need to win", as his Celtic teammate Tom Heinsohn observed. He was so tense before every game that he regularly vomited in the locker room; early in his career, it happened so frequently that his fellow Celtics were more worried when it did not happen than when it did. Later in Russell's career, John Havlicek said of his teammate and coach that he threw up less often than early in his career, only doing so "when it's an important game or an important challenge for him—someone like Chamberlain, or someone coming up that everyone's touting. [The sound of Russell throwing up] is a welcome sound, too, because it means he's keyed up for the game, and around the locker room we grin and say, 'Man, we're going to be all right tonight.'" In a retrospective interview, Russell described the state of mind he felt he needed to enter in order to be able to play basketball: "I had to almost be in a rage. Nothing went on outside the borders of the court. I could hear anything, I could see anything, and nothing mattered. And I could anticipate every move that every player made."

In his career, Russell won five NBA MVP awards (1959, 1961–63, 1965), which is tied with Michael Jordan for second all-time behind Kareem Abdul-Jabbar's six awards. He was selected three times to the All-NBA First Teams (1959, 1963, 1965) and eight Second Teams (1958, 1960–62, 1964, 1966–68), and was a 12-time NBA All-Star (1958–1969). Russell was elected to one NBA All-Defensive First Team. This took place during his last season (1969) and was the first season the NBA All-Defensive Teams were selected. In 1970, The Sporting News named Russell the "Athlete of the Decade". Russell is universally seen as one of the best NBA players ever, and he was declared "Greatest Player in the History of the NBA" by the Professional Basketball Writers Association of America in 1980.

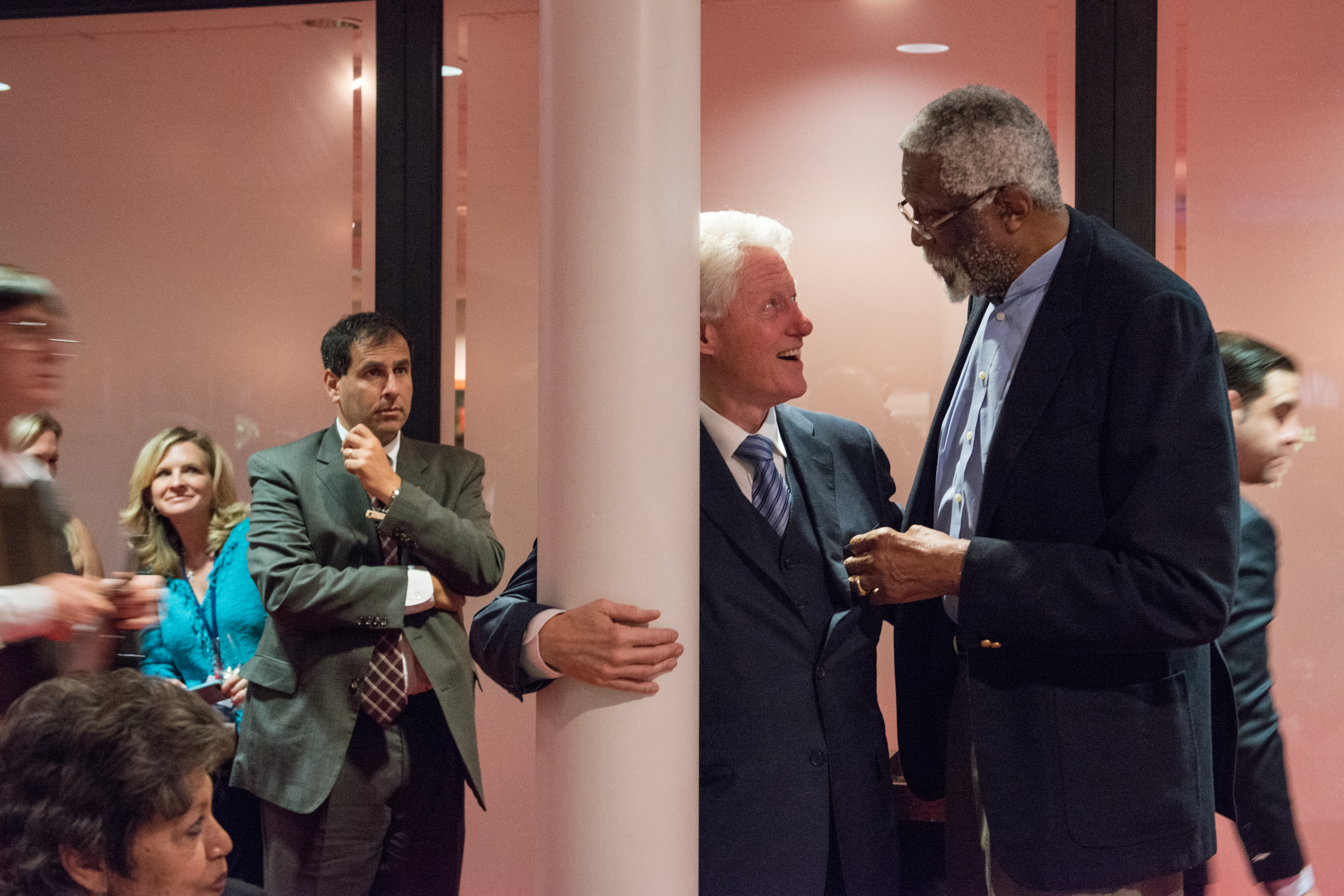
Former president Bill Clinton and Russell at the LBJ Presidential Library's Civil Rights Summit in 2014

For his achievements, Russell was named "Sportsman of the Year" by Sports Illustrated in 1968. He is one of four players (along with Cousy, George Mikan, and Bob Pettit) to have made all four NBA anniversary teams: the NBA 25th Anniversary Team (1970), the NBA 35th Anniversary Team (1980), the NBA 50th Anniversary Team (1996), and the NBA 75th Anniversary Team (2021). Russell ranked No. 18 on ESPN's "50 Greatest Athletes of the 20th Century" list in 1999. In 2007, he was voted the third best center of all time by ESPN behind Abdul-Jabbar and Chamberlain. In 2009, Slam named him the third best player of all-time behind Jordan and Chamberlain. In 2020, he was ranked No. 4 in ESPN's list of the top 74 NBA players of all time, the second best center behind Abdul-Jabbar and ahead of Chamberlain. In 2022, he was ranked No. 6 in ESPN's NBA 75th Anniversary Team list, and No. 4 in a similar list by The Athletic.

Of Russell, former NBA player and head coach Don Nelson said: "There are two types of superstars. One makes himself look good at the expense of the other guys on the floor. But there's another type who makes the players around him look better than they are, and that's the type Russell was." In 2000, his longtime teammate Tom Heinsohn described both Russell's stature and his uneasy relationship with Boston more earthily, saying: "Look, all I know is the guy ... came to Boston and won 11 championships in 13 years, and they named a bleeping tunnel after Ted Williams." During the NBA All-Star Weekend on February 14, 2009, NBA Commissioner David Stern announced that the NBA Finals MVP award would be named after Russell. He was named as a 2010 recipient of the Presidential Medal of Freedom. On June 15, 2017, Russell was announced as the inaugural recipient of the NBA Lifetime Achievement Award.

On August 11, 2022, it was announced that Russell's No. 6 jersey would be retired throughout the National Basketball Association, the first time a jersey had been retired league-wide in NBA history, and joining Jackie Robinson and Wayne Gretzky in the honor among the four major American sports leagues. However, the NBA players who wore the number 6 jersey at that time, such as LeBron James, may keep the number under the grandfather clause until they voluntarily change it or retire, similar to what MLB players did with Robinson's No. 42.

In October 2024, Boston Mayor Michelle Wu and other officials announced that the city would rename the new North Washington Street Bridge (located near TD Garden) in honor of Russell. At the time of the renaming, the "William Felton 'Bill' Russell Bridge" was under construction as the replacement of a bridge known locally as the Charlestown Bridge.

=== Statue ===
In 2013, Boston honored Russell by erecting a statue of him on City Hall Plaza. He is depicted in-game, surrounded by 11 plinths representing the 11 championships he helped the Celtics win. Each plinth features a key word and related quote to illustrate Russell's multiple accomplishments. The Bill Russell Legacy Foundation, established by the Boston Celtics Shamrock Foundation, funded the project. The art is by Ann Hirsch of Somerville, Massachusetts, in collaboration with Pressley Associates Landscape Architects of Boston. The statue was unveiled on November 1, 2013, with Russell in attendance. During the spring of 2015, two statues of children were added, honoring Russell's commitment to working with children. These statues were modeled by a local boy from Somerville and multiple girls from the surrounding area.

=== West Coast Conference's Russell Rule ===
On August 2, 2020, the West Coast Conference (WCC), which has been home to Russell's alma mater of USF since the league's formation in 1952, (Note: During Russell's college career, the conference was known as the California Basketball Association.) became the first NCAA Division I conference to adopt a conference-wide diversity hiring commitment, announcing the Russell Rule, named after Russell and based on the National Football League's Rooney Rule. In its announcement, the WCC stated: "The 'Russell Rule' requires each member institution to include a member of a traditionally underrepresented community in the pool of final candidates for every athletic director, senior administrator, head coach and full-time assistant coach position in the athletic department."

== Awards and honors ==
Basketball Triple Crown

NBA

- 11× NBA champion (1957, 1959–1966, 1968, 1969)
- 5× NBA Most Valuable Player (1958, 1961–1963, 1965)
- 12× NBA All-Star (1958–1969)
- NBA All-Star Game MVP (1963)
- 3× All-NBA First Team (1959, 1963, 1965)
- 8× All-NBA Second Team (1958, 1960–1962, 1964, 1966–1968)
- NBA All-Defensive First Team (1969)
- 4× NBA rebounding champion (1958, 1959, 1964, 1965)
- NBA minutes played leaders (1959)
- NBA Lifetime Achievement Award (2017)
- NBA anniversary team (25th, 35th, 50th, 75th)
- No. 6 retired by Boston Celtics
- No. 6 retired by NBA leaguewide
- Statue at Boston City Hall Plaza
- NBA Finals Most Valuable Player Trophy named in Russell's honor (2009)

As coach

- 2× NBA champion (1968, 1969)

USA Basketball

- Olympic Gold Medal (1956)

NCAA

- 2× WCC regular season champion (1955, 1956)
- 2× NCAA champion (1955, 1956)
- NCAA Tournament Most Outstanding Player (1955)
- UPI College Player of the Year (1956)
- 2× Helms Player of the Year (1955, 1956)
- 2× Consensus first-team All-American (1955, 1956)
  - 2× AP first-team All-American (1955, 1956)
  - 2× UPI first-team All-American (1955, 1956)
  - 2× Look Magazine first-team All-American (1955, 1956)
  - 2× NEA first-team All-American (1955, 1956)
  - 2× International News Service first-team All-American (1955, 1956)
  - 2× Collier's All-American (1955 second-team, 1956 first-team)
- WCC Player of the Year (1956)
- 3× First-team All-WCC (1954–1956)
- No. 6 retired by San Francisco Dons

Media

- Philadelphia Sports Writers Association Athlete of the Year (1965)
- Sporting News Athlete of the Decade (1960s)
- Sports Illustrated Sportsman of the Year (1968)
- 4× Sporting News NBA MVP (1961–1963, 1965)
- 4× USBWA NBA MVP (1961–1963, 1965)
- 2× Sam Davis Memorial Award (1961, 1965)
- AP 1960s NBA All-Decade Team
- Sporting News 1960s NBA All-Decade First Team
- Academy of Achievement – Golden Plate Award (2008)
- Harold & Carole Pump Foundation – Lifetime Achievement Award (2009)
- Sports Illustrated's Muhammad Ali Legacy Award (2016)

National

- Presidential Medal of Freedom (2011)

Halls of Fame

- United States Olympic Hall of Fame – Class of 1986 (as a member of the 1956 Olympic gold medalist team)
- FIBA Hall of Fame – Inaugural Class of 2007
- 2× Naismith Memorial Basketball Hall of Fame
  - Class of 1975 – as player (first African-American)
  - Class of 2021 – as coach
- National Collegiate Basketball Hall of Fame – Inaugural Class of 2006
- University of San Francisco Athletics Hall of Fame – Class of 1959
- Bay Area Sports Hall of Fame – Inaugural Class of 1980

== NBA career statistics ==
Legend
| GP | Games played | GS | Games started | MPG | Minutes per game |
| FG% | Field goal percentage | 3P% | 3-point field goal percentage | FT% | Free throw percentage |
| RPG | Rebounds per game | APG | Assists per game | SPG | Steals per game |
| BPG | Blocks per game | PPG | Points per game | **Bold** | Career high |
| † | Won an NBA championship | * | Led the league | ‡ | NBA record |

=== Regular season ===
Bill Russell regular season statistics
| Year | Team | GP | MPG | FG% | FT% | RPG | APG | PPG |
|---|---|---|---|---|---|---|---|---|
| 1956–57† | Boston | 48 | 35.3 | .427 | .492 | 19.6* | 1.8 | 14.7 |
| 1957–58 | Boston | 69 | 38.3 | .442 | .519 | 22.7* | 2.9 | 16.6 |
| 1958–59† | Boston | 70 | 42.6* | .457 | .598 | 23.0* | 3.2 | 16.7 |
| 1959–60† | Boston | 74 | 42.5 | **.467** | **.612** | 24.0 | 3.7 | 18.2 |
| 1960–61† | Boston | 78 | 44.3 | .426 | .550 | 23.9 | 3.4 | 16.9 |
| 1961–62† | Boston | 76 | **45.2** | .457 | .575 | 23.6 | 4.5 | **18.9** |
| 1962–63† | Boston | 78 | 44.9 | .432 | .555 | 23.6 | 4.5 | 16.8 |
| 1963–64† | Boston | 78 | 44.6 | .433 | .550 | **24.7*** | 4.7 | 15.0 |
| 1964–65† | Boston | 78 | 44.4 | .438 | .573 | 24.1* | 5.3 | 14.1 |
| 1965–66† | Boston | 78 | 43.4 | .415 | .551 | 22.8 | 4.8 | 12.9 |
| 1966–67 | Boston | **81*** | 40.7 | .454 | .610 | 21.0 | **5.8** | 13.3 |
| 1967–68† | Boston | 78 | 37.9 | .425 | .537 | 18.6 | 4.6 | 12.5 |
| 1968–69† | Boston | 77 | 42.7 | .433 | .526 | 19.3 | 4.9 | 9.9 |
| Career | | 963 | 42.3 | .440 | .561 | 22.5 | 4.3 | 15.1 |
| All-Star | | 12 | 28.5 | .459 | .529 | 11.5 | 3.2 | 10.0 |

=== Playoffs ===
Bill Russell post-season statistics
| Year | Team | GP | MPG | FG% | FT% | RPG | APG | PPG |
|---|---|---|---|---|---|---|---|---|
| 1957† | Boston | 10* | 40.9 | .365 | .508 | 24.4* | 3.2 | 13.9 |
| 1958 | Boston | 9 | 39.4 | .361 | .606 | 24.6* | 2.7 | 15.1 |
| 1959† | Boston | 11 | 45.1* | .409 | .612 | 27.7* | 3.6 | 15.5 |
| 1960† | Boston | 13 | 44.0 | .456 | .707 | 25.8* | 2.9 | 18.5 |
| 1961† | Boston | 10 | 46.2* | .427 | .523 | **29.9*** | 4.8 | 19.1 |
| 1962† | Boston | 14* | **48.0*** | .458 | **.726** | 26.4 | 5.0 | **22.4** |
| 1963† | Boston | 13* | 47.5 | .453 | .661 | 25.1* | 5.1 | 20.3 |
| 1964† | Boston | 10 | 45.1 | .356 | .552 | 27.2* | 4.4 | 13.1 |
| 1965† | Boston | 12* | 46.8 | **.527** | .526 | 25.2 | **6.3** | 16.5 |
| 1966† | Boston | 17* | 47.9 | .475 | .618 | 25.2 | 5.0 | 19.1 |
| 1967 | Boston | 9 | 43.3 | .360 | .635 | 22.0 | 5.6 | 10.6 |
| 1968† | Boston | **19*** | 45.7 | .409 | .585 | 22.8 | 5.2 | 14.4 |
| 1969† | Boston | 18* | 46.1 | .423 | .506 | 20.5 | 5.4 | 10.8 |
| Career | | 165 | 45.4 | .430 | .603 | 24.9‡ | 4.7 | 16.2 |

== Head coaching record ==
Legend
| Regular season | G | Games coached | W | Games won | L | Games lost | W–L % | Win–loss % |
| Playoffs | PG | Playoff games | PW | Playoff wins | PL | Playoff losses | PW–L % | Playoff win–loss % |

Bill Russell coaching statistics
| Team | Year | G | W | L | W–L% | Finish | PG | PW | PL | PW–L% | Result |
|---|---|---|---|---|---|---|---|---|---|---|---|
| Boston | 1966–67 | 81 | 60 | 21 | .671 | 2nd in Eastern | 9 | 4 | 5 | .444 | Lost in Division finals |
| Boston | 1967–68 | 82 | 54 | 28 | .659 | 2nd in Eastern | 19 | 12 | 7 | .632 | Won NBA championship |
| Boston | 1968–69 | 82 | 48 | 34 | .585 | 4th in Eastern | 18 | 12 | 6 | .667 | Won NBA championship |
| Seattle | 1973–74 | 82 | 36 | 46 | .439 | 3rd in Pacific | — | — | — | — | Missed playoffs |
| Seattle | 1974–75 | 82 | 43 | 39 | .524 | 2nd in Pacific | 9 | 4 | 5 | .444 | Lost in Conference semifinals |
| Seattle | 1975–76 | 82 | 43 | 39 | .524 | 2nd in Pacific | 6 | 2 | 4 | .333 | Lost in Conference semifinals |
| Seattle | 1976–77 | 82 | 40 | 42 | .488 | 4th in Pacific | — | — | — | — | Missed playoffs |
| Sacramento | 1987–88 | 58 | 17 | 41 | .293 | (dismissed) | — | — | — | — | — |
| Career | | 631 | 341 | 290 | .540 | | 61 | 34 | 27 | .557 | |

== Personal life and death ==
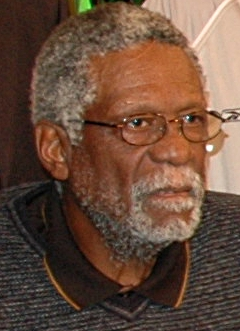
Russell in 2005

Russell was a resident of Mercer Island, Washington, for nearly five decades.

In 1959, Russell became the first NBA player to visit Africa.

Russell was a member of Kappa Alpha Psi fraternity, having been initiated into its Gamma Alpha chapter while a student at University of San Francisco.

On October 16, 2013, Russell was arrested for bringing his registered, loaded .38-caliber Smith & Wesson handgun to the Seattle–Tacoma International Airport. He was issued a citation and released, and the Transportation Security Administration indicated it would levy a civil penalty, which would be between $3,000 and $7,500.

=== Marriages and children ===
Russell was married to his college sweetheart Rose Swisher from 1956 to 1973. They had three children: daughter Karen Russell, a television pundit and lawyer, and sons William Jr. and Jacob. The couple grew emotionally distant and divorced. In 1977, he married Dorothy Anstett, Miss USA of 1968; they divorced in 1980. In 1996, Russell married his third wife, Marilyn Nault; their marriage lasted until her death in January 2009. Russell was married to Jeannine Russell at the time of his death.

=== Personality ===
In 1966, The New York Times wrote that "Russell's main characteristics are pride, intelligence, an active and appreciative sense of humor, a preoccupation with dignity, a capacity for consideration once his friendship or sympathy has been aroused, and an unwillingness to compromise whatever truths he has accepted." In 2009, Russell wrote his paternal grandfather's motto, passed down to his father and then to him: "A man has to draw a line inside himself that he won't allow any man to cross." Russell said he was "proud of my grandfather's heroic dignity against forces more powerful than him ... he would not allow himself to be oppressed or intimidated by anyone." He wrote these words after recounting how grandfather Jake Russell had stood up to the Ku Klux Klan and other whites who attempted to thwart his efforts to build a schoolhouse for black children; his grandfather was the first person in Russell's patrilineal line born free in North America and was himself illiterate. Russell's motto became: "If you disrespect that line, you disrespect me."

Russell was known for his distinctive high-pitched laugh, of which Red Auerbach quipped: "There are only two things that could make me quit coaching. My wife and Russell's laugh." To teammates and friends, Russell was open and amicable; he was extremely distrusting and cold towards anyone else. Journalists were often treated to the "Russell Glower", described as an "icily contemptuous stare accompanied by a long silence". Russell was also notorious for his refusal to give autographs or acknowledge the Celtics fans, and was called "the most selfish, surly and uncooperative athlete" by one pundit.

=== Death ===
Russell died at his Mercer Island, Washington, home on July 31, 2022, at the age of 88. The news was announced in a Twitter post by his family. In a statement, NBA Commissioner Adam Silver said that Russell was "the greatest champion in all of team sports".

== Selected publications ==
- Russell, Bill; McSweeny, William (1966). Go Up for Glory. Coward-McCann.
- Russell, Bill; Branch, Taylor (1979). Second Wind. Ballantine Books. ISBN 978-0-394-50385-1.
- Russell, Bill; Faulkner, David (2001). Russell Rules: 11 Lessons on Leadership from the Twentieth Century's Greatest Winner. New American Library. ISBN 0-525-94598-9.
- Russell, Bill; Steinberg, Alan (2009). Red and Me: My Coach, My Lifelong Friend. Harper. ISBN 978-0-06-176614-5.

=== Documentary series ===
- Bill Russell: Legend, Netflix, 2023

== See also ==
- List of National Basketball Association career rebounding leaders
- List of National Basketball Association career minutes played leaders
- List of National Basketball Association career playoff rebounding leaders
- List of National Basketball Association career playoff triple-double leaders
- List of National Basketball Association annual rebounding leaders
- List of National Basketball Association annual minutes leaders
- List of National Basketball Association single-game rebounding leaders
- List of National Basketball Association single-season rebounding leaders
- List of National Basketball Association longest winning streaks
- List of NBA players with most championships
- List of NCAA Division I men's basketball career rebounding leaders
- Race and ethnicity in the NBA
