= Jerry Greenspan =

American basketball player (1941–2019)

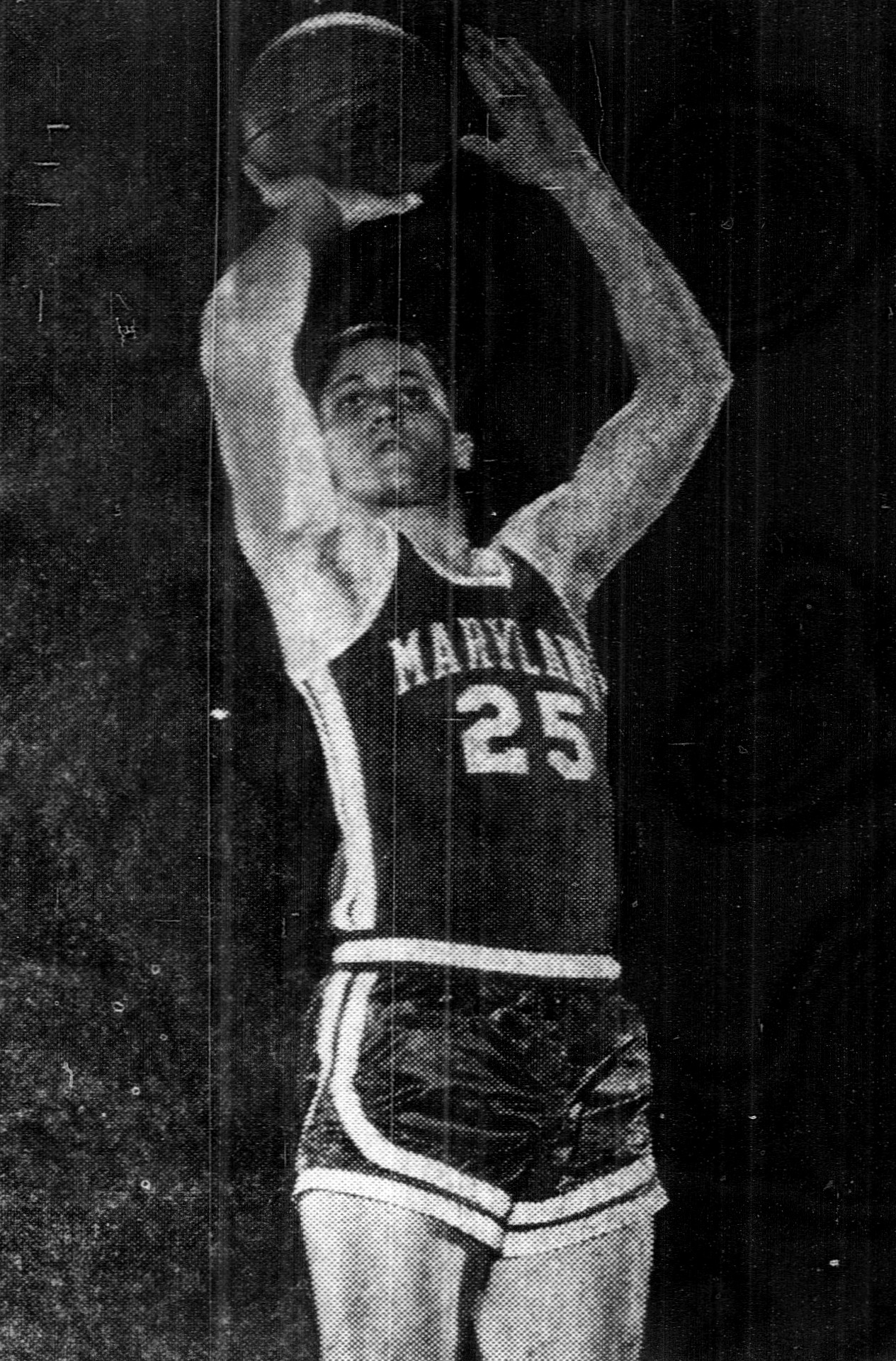
- Greenspan, circa 1963

Personal information
- Born: November 22, 1941 Newark, New Jersey, U.S.
- Died: September 11, 2019 (aged 77) Florham Park, New Jersey, U.S.
- Listed height: 6 ft 5 in (1.96 m)
- Listed weight: 195 lb (88 kg)

Career information
- High school: Weequahic (Newark, New Jersey)
- College: Maryland (1960–1963)
- NBA draft: 1963: 3rd round, 24th overall pick
- Drafted by: Syracuse Nationals
- Playing career: 1963–1965
- Position: Shooting guard
- Number: 22

Career history
- 1963–1965: Philadelphia 76ers

Career highlights
- Second-team All-ACC (1963)
- Stats at NBA.com
- Stats at Basketball Reference

Gerald Greenspan (November 22, 1941 – September 11, 2019) was an American basketball player. Greenspan, who was 6' 7", 275 lbs. played shooting guard.

== College ==
Born and raised in Newark, New Jersey, he played at the University of Maryland. Greenspan led the team in scoring and rebounds in 1962 and 1963. He received an honorable mention for the 1963 All-American team, and was named to the second team for the All-Atlantic Coast Conference. He had 501 rebounds during his college career.

== NBA ==
He was drafted by the Syracuse Nationals in the third round of the 1963 NBA draft. Greenspan remained with the team until his retirement at the end of the 1964–65 NBA season.

== Hall of Fame ==
Greenspan, who was Jewish, was inducted into the MetroWest Jewish Sports Hall of Fame in 2005.

== Career statistics ==
Legend
GP	Games played	GS	Games started	MPG	Minutes per game
FG%	Field goal percentage	3P%	3-point field goal percentage	FT%	Free throw percentage
RPG	Rebounds per game	APG	Assists per game	SPG	Steals per game
BPG	Blocks per game	PPG	Points per game	**Bold**	Career high

=== NBA ===
==== Regular season ====
Year	Team	GP	MPG	FG%	FT%	RPG	APG	PPG
1963–64	Philadelphia	**20**	**14.0**	.356	.680	**3.6**	**.6**	**4.9**
1964–65	Philadelphia	5	9.8	**.615**	**1.000**	2.2	.0	4.8
Career		25	13.2	.388	.724	3.3	.4	4.9

== See also ==
- List of select Jewish basketball players
