= 1964–65 Boston Celtics season =

NBA basketball team season (won championship)

- NBA champions
- Division champions
- Head coach: Red Auerbach
- Owners: Walter Brown
- Arena: Boston Garden

Results
- Record: 62–18 (.775)
- Place: Division: 1st (Eastern)
- Playoff finish: NBA champions (Defeated Lakers 4–1)
- Stats at Basketball Reference

Local media
- Television: WHDH-TV; WIHS-TV
- Radio: WHDH

The 1964–65 Boston Celtics season was the Celtics' 19th season in the NBA. The Celtics finished the season by winning their eighth NBA Championship, defeating the Los Angeles Lakers in five games. In 1996, the team was named one of the 10 greatest teams in NBA history. In addition five players were inducted into the Hall of Fame - K. C. Jones, Sam Jones, Tom Heinsohn, Bill Russell, and John Havlicek. Sam Jones, Havlicek, and Russell were selected as among the NBA's 50 greatest players. Both Red Auerbach and John Thompson were elected into the Hall of Fame as coaches.

On December 26, 1964, the Celtics fielded the first all-Black starting lineup in NBA history.

This season is best noted for Havlicek's heroic "steal" of the ball against the Philadelphia 76ers in Game 7 of the Eastern Division final, immortalized in a commentary by Johnny Most where he exclaims that "Havlicek stole the ball." This is considered one of the greatest NBA moments, and its importance over time was overshadowed by the subsequent finals between the Celtics and Lakers (of which there were many played in that era). Despite this, HoopsHype would rank this squad as the team with the tenth-easiest route to the NBA Finals championship in 2024 due to the record that the 76ers had at the time they met in the Playoffs.

== Offseason ==
=== NBA draft ===
The 1965 NBA draft took place on May 4, 1964.

Round	Pick	Player	Position	Nationality	School/Club team
1	7	Mel Counts	Center / Forward	United States	Oregon State
2	16	Ron Bonham	Forward	United States	Cincinnati

== Roster ==
1964–65 Boston Celtics roster
Players

Pos.	No.	Player	Height	Weight	DOB	From
F	21	Ron Bonham	6 ft 5 in (1.96 m)	192 lb (87 kg)		Cincinnati
C	11	Mel Counts	7 ft 0 in (2.13 m)	230 lb (104 kg)		Oregon State
G/F	17	John Havlicek	6 ft 5 in (1.96 m)	203 lb (92 kg)		Ohio State
F	15	Tom Heinsohn	6 ft 7 in (2.01 m)	218 lb (99 kg)		Holy Cross
G	25	K. C. Jones	6 ft 1 in (1.85 m)	200 lb (91 kg)		San Francisco
G/F	24	Sam Jones	6 ft 4 in (1.93 m)	198 lb (90 kg)		North Carolina Central
F	12	Willie Naulls	6 ft 6 in (1.98 m)	225 lb (102 kg)		UCLA
C	6	Bill Russell	6 ft 10 in (2.08 m)	215 lb (98 kg)		San Francisco
F	16	Satch Sanders	6 ft 6 in (1.98 m)	210 lb (95 kg)		NYU
G	20	Larry Siegfried	6 ft 3 in (1.91 m)	190 lb (86 kg)		Ohio State
F/C	18	John Thompson	6 ft 10 in (2.08 m)	225 lb (102 kg)		Providence
G	4	Gerry Ward	6 ft 4 in (1.93 m)	195 lb (88 kg)		Boston College

Coaches
Head coach
- Red Auerbach

Legend
- (DP) Unsigned draft pick
- (FA) Free agent
- (S) Suspended
- Injured

== Regular season ==
=== Season standings ===
Eastern Division	W	L	PCT	GB	Home	Road	Neutral	Div
x-Boston Celtics	62	18	.775	–	27–3	27–11	8–4	20–10
x-Cincinnati Royals	48	32	.600	14	25–7	17–21	6–4	16–14
x-Philadelphia 76ers	40	40	.500	22	13–12	9–21	18–7	14–16
New York Knicks	31	49	.388	31	15–20	9–21	7–8	10–20

=== Game log ===
1964–65 game log
#	Date	Opponent	Score	High points	Record
1	October 17	Detroit	81–112	Bill Russell (19)	1–0
2	October 22	N Detroit	102–104	Sam Jones (23)	2–0
3	October 24	Baltimore	103–131	Sam Jones (28)	3–0
4	October 25	@ Baltimore	112–100	Sam Jones (26)	4–0
5	October 27	@ New York	131–103	Sam Jones (30)	5–0
6	October 28	@ St. Louis	119–117	Sam Jones (27)	6–0
7	October 30	@ Detroit	106–90	Sam Jones (28)	7–0
8	October 31	Cincinnati	94–122	Sam Jones (22)	8–0
9	November 7	Detroit	113–130	Heinsohn, S. Jones (18)	9–0
10	November 8	@ Cincinnati	106–103	Sam Jones (26)	10–0
11	November 11	San Francisco	84–110	Larry Siegfried (20)	11–0
12	November 12	N Philadelphia	110–109	Sam Jones (24)	11–1
13	November 13	Los Angeles	114–112	Sam Jones (32)	11–2
14	November 14	@ Philadelphia	113–102	John Havlicek (24)	12–2
15	November 17	@ Baltimore	99–102	Sam Jones (33)	12–3
16	November 18	St. Louis	97–100	John Havlicek (26)	13–3
17	November 20	N New York	120–127	Sam Jones (29)	14–3
18	November 21	N Philadelphia	108–96	Sam Jones (29)	14–4
19	November 25	San Francisco	118–122	Sam Jones (30)	15–4
20	November 26	@ St. Louis	98–110	John Havlicek (21)	15–5
21	November 28	Cincinnati	98–129	John Havlicek (19)	16–5
22	December 1	@ New York	117–113 (OT)	Sam Jones (37)	17–5
23	December 2	New York	91–116	Heinsohn, S. Jones (20)	18–5
24	December 4	@ San Francisco	85–112	Mel Counts (15)	18–6
25	December 5	@ San Francisco	105–81	Sam Jones (22)	19–6
26	December 8	@ Los Angeles	108–98	John Havlicek (25)	20–6
27	December 10	@ Cincinnati	116–101	Sam Jones (22)	21–6
28	December 11	@ Philadelphia	118–109	Sam Jones (33)	22–6
29	December 12	Baltimore	99–112	Heinsohn, S. Jones (27)	23–6
30	December 15	N St. Louis	109–124	Sam Jones (26)	24–6
31	December 16	San Francisco	106–107	Sam Jones (32)	25–6
32	December 17	N New York	113–112	John Havlicek (23)	25–7
33	December 19	@ St. Louis	115–105	Sam Jones (28)	26–7
34	December 25	N Detroit	106–118	Sam Jones (34)	27–7
35	December 26	@ St. Louis	97–84	Sam Jones (32)	28–7
36	December 27	N Detroit	106–112	Sam Jones (40)	29–7
37	December 28	Los Angeles	112–133	Willie Naulls (22)	30–7
38	December 30	@ Baltimore	121–114	Sam Jones (37)	31–7
39	January 2	@ Detroit	101–89	John Havlicek (23)	32–7
40	January 3	@ Cincinnati	89–85	Sam Jones (31)	33–7
41	January 6	St. Louis	106–138	Ron Bonham (19)	34–7
42	January 7	@ Los Angeles	112–104	Sam Jones (33)	35–7
43	January 8	@ San Francisco	94–91	Bill Russell (22)	36–7
44	January 9	@ Los Angeles	107–103	John Havlicek (24)	37–7
45	January 15	Philadelphia	95–104	Sam Jones (29)	38–7
46	January 17	Cincinnati	98–101	Sam Jones (30)	39–7
47	January 20	@ Baltimore	131–105	Sam Jones (34)	40–7
48	January 22	San Francisco	94–104	Willie Naulls (24)	41–7
49	January 23	N Philadelphia	104–100	Sam Jones (35)	41–8
50	January 24	Los Angeles	93–117	Sam Jones (27)	42–8
51	January 25	N Baltimore	142–104	Sam Jones (27)	43–8
52	January 27	Philadelphia	98–115	Sam Jones (29)	44–8
53	January 29	@ Philadelphia	105–118	John Havlicek (25)	44–9
54	January 30	@ New York	97–90	Sam Jones (25)	45–9
55	January 31	New York	95–123	John Havlicek (22)	46–9
56	February 3	Baltimore	122–114	John Havlicek (38)	46–10
57	February 5	Cincinnati	113–114	Sam Jones (32)	47–10
58	February 7	Los Angeles	97–101	Sam Jones (27)	48–10
59	February 9	@ Cincinnati	121–134	Sam Jones (28)	48–11
60	February 10	@ Detroit	117–106	John Havlicek (33)	49–11
61	February 12	New York	92–94 (OT)	Sam Jones (34)	50–11
62	February 13	@ New York	113–123	Sam Jones (44)	50–12
63	February 14	Baltimore	111–126	Sam Jones (35)	51–12
64	February 17	St. Louis	114–121	Sam Jones (32)	52–12
65	February 18	N St. Louis	109–119	John Havlicek (28)	53–12
66	February 20	@ San Francisco	114–108	John Havlicek (27)	54–12
67	February 21	@ Los Angeles	114–129	Sam Jones (29)	54–13
68	February 24	@ Los Angeles	97–95	Sam Jones (27)	55–13
69	February 26	@ San Francisco	130–112	Sam Jones (26)	56–13
70	February 28	@ St. Louis	108–102	Tom Heinsohn (23)	57–13
71	March 3	Los Angeles	104–102	Sam Jones (28)	57–14
72	March 5	@ Baltimore	124–128 (OT)	Sam Jones (38)	57–15
73	March 6	@ Philadelphia	98–103	Havlicek, S. Jones (21)	57–16
74	March 7	Philadelphia	111–133	Sam Jones (27)	58–16
75	March 10	@ Detroit	124–106	Sam Jones (28)	59–16
76	March 11	N Detroit	100–112	Bill Russell (27)	60–16
77	March 12	@ Cincinnati	108–118	Sam Jones (32)	60–17
78	March 14	San Francisco	98–106	Sam Jones (24)	61–17
79	March 17	@ New York	114–119	Sam Jones (28)	61–18
80	March 21	Cincinnati	99–116	Bill Russell (23)	62–18

== Playoffs ==
1965 playoff game log
Division Finals: 4–3 (home: 4–0; road: 0–3)

Game	Date	Team	Score	High points	High rebounds	High assists	Location Attendance	Series
1	April 4	Philadelphia	W 108–98	Tom Heinsohn (23)	Bill Russell (32)	Bill Russell (6)	Boston Garden; 13,909	1–0
2	April 6	@ Philadelphia	L 103–109	Sam Jones (40)	Bill Russell (16)	Bill Russell (5)	Municipal Auditorium; 9,790	1–1
3	April 8	Philadelphia	W 112–94	S. Jones, Havlicek (24)	Bill Russell (26)	Bill Russell (8)	Boston Garden; 13,909	2–1
4	April 9	@ Philadelphia	L 131–134 (OT)	Sam Jones (36)	Bill Russell (25)	K. C. Jones (10)	Municipal Auditorium; 9,294	2–2
5	April 11	Philadelphia	W 114–108	Sam Jones (29)	Bill Russell (28)	K. C. Jones (9)	Boston Garden; 13,909	3–2
6	April 13	@ Philadelphia	L 106–112	Tom Sanders (25)	Bill Russell (21)	Russell, K. C. Jones (5)	Municipal Auditorium; 11,182	3–3
7	April 15	Philadelphia	W 110–109	Sam Jones (37)	Bill Russell (8)	K. C. Jones (10)	Boston Garden; 13,909	4–3

NBA Finals: 4–1 (home: 3–0; road: 1–1)

Game	Date	Team	Score	High points	High rebounds	High assists	Location Attendance	Series
1	April 18	Los Angeles	W 142–110	Sam Jones (25)	Bill Russell (28)	K. C. Jones (8)	Boston Garden; 13,909	1–0
2	April 19	Los Angeles	W 129–123	John Havlicek (24)	Bill Russell (25)	Bill Russell (10)	Boston Garden; 13,909	2–0
3	April 21	@ Los Angeles	L 105–126	Sam Jones (35)	Bill Russell (19)	Larry Siegfried (5)	Los Angeles Memorial Sports Arena; 14,243	2–1
4	April 23	@ Los Angeles	W 112–99	Sam Jones (37)	Bill Russell (23)	Russell, K. C. Jones (5)	Los Angeles Memorial Sports Arena; 15,217	3–1
5	April 25	Los Angeles	W 129–96	S. Jones, Russell (22)	Bill Russell (30)	K. C. Jones (9)	Boston Garden; 13,909	4–1

1965 schedule

== Awards and honors ==
- Bill Russell, NBA Most Valuable Player Award
- Red Auerbach, NBA Coach of the Year Award
- Bill Russell, All-NBA First Team
- Sam Jones, All-NBA Second Team
