= 1964–65 NBA season =

19th NBA season

- League: National Basketball Association
- Sport: Basketball
- Duration: October 16, 1964 – March 21, 1965; March 24 – April 15, 1965 (Playoffs); April 18–25, 1965 (Finals)
- Games: 80
- Teams: 9
- TV partner: ABC

Draft
- Top draft pick: Jim Barnes
- Picked by: New York Knicks

Regular season
- Top seed: Boston Celtics
- Season MVP: Bill Russell (Boston)
- Top scorer: Wilt Chamberlain (San Francisco/Philadelphia)

Playoffs
- Eastern champions: Boston Celtics
- Eastern runners-up: Philadelphia 76ers
- Western champions: Los Angeles Lakers
- Western runners-up: Baltimore Bullets

Finals
- Champions: Boston Celtics
- Runners-up: Los Angeles Lakers

NBA seasons
- ← 1963–64 1965–66 →

The 1964–65 NBA season was the 19th season of the National Basketball Association. The season ended with the Boston Celtics winning their seventh straight NBA championship, beating the Los Angeles Lakers 4 games to 1 in the NBA Finals.

== Season recap ==
=== Preseason ===
The season marked real change for the league. NBA Commissioner Maurice Podoloff, who had held the office since the formation of the league (as the Basketball Association of America) in 1946, retired. Walter Kennedy took over his position.

=== Regular season ===
Red Auerbach's loaded Boston Celtics won 62 of 80 games in the nine team league. The balanced Celts had seven ten-point scorers plus the defense and rebounding of Bill Russell. Boston led the league in both of those team stats.

Four other teams won half their games or better. The Los Angeles Lakers won the West Division with 49 wins in 80 games behind superstars Elgin Baylor and Jerry West. The Cincinnati Royals won 48 of 80 games with their own two superstars, Oscar Robertson and Jerry Lucas. The St. Louis Hawks had seven ten-point scorers also and won 45 of 80 games, but lost star Bob Pettit to knee injury. The Philadelphia 76ers won half of their 80 games while working Wilt Chamberlain into their scheme. Chamberlain joined the team in mid-season right after the all-star game, a move which instantly made the new 76ers contenders.

=== Playoffs ===
==== East ====
The NBA had six playoff teams that year, with the second and third place teams from each division, East and West, meeting in the first round. The winners of this play-in round would then meet the division winners to decide the finalists.

Cincinnati, which had no real center, could not deal with Chamberlain, so Philadelphia advanced three games to one. But the 76ers, despite three All Stars alongside their giant star, could not unseat the champion Celtics, who held off Philly by a single point in Game 7 when John Havlicek stole the ball in the final seconds.

==== West ====
In the West, which produced no NBA champions from 1959 to 1970, Baltimore upset the injured St. Louis Hawks to meet Los Angeles. The Lakers overcame the Bullets' three 20-point scorers to meet Boston in the Finals.

==== Finals ====
It was the fourth time the two teams had met in the Finals since 1958. Laker star Elgin Baylor was lost to a knee injury just five minutes into the playoffs. The Lakers had no answer for Bill Russell inside as well. But Laker star Jerry West courageously tried to keep his team alive by averaging over 40 points through the Lakers 11 playoff games. The balance and depth of Boston was too much for that.

== Notable occurrences ==
- The 1965 NBA All-Star Game was played at the Kiel Auditorium in St. Louis, Missouri, with the East beating the West 124–123. Jerry Lucas of the Cincinnati Royals won the game's MVP award.
- ABC started televising the Sunday afternoon Game-Of-The-Week. ABC would continue to do so until they lost the rights to CBS following the 1972–73 season. After that, ABC would not broadcast the NBA until Christmas Day of 2002.
- General Motors began a sponsorship deal with the NBA, rotating among all six of its divisions (Chevrolet, Pontiac, Oldsmobile, Buick, Cadillac and GMC Truck). This status continued through 2004.

Coaching changes
Offseason
Team	1963–64 coach	1964–65 coach
Baltimore Bullets	Bobby Leonard	Buddy Jeannette
In-season
Team	Outgoing coach	Incoming coach
Detroit Pistons	Charles Wolf	Dave DeBusschere
New York Knicks	Eddie Donovan	Harry Gallatin
St. Louis Hawks	Harry Gallatin	Richie Guerin

== Final standings ==
=== Eastern Division ===
Eastern Division	W	L	PCT	GB	Home	Road	Neutral	Div
x-Boston Celtics	62	18	.775	–	27–3	27–11	8–4	20–10
x-Cincinnati Royals	48	32	.600	14	25–7	17–21	6–4	16–14
x-Philadelphia 76ers	40	40	.500	22	13–12	9–21	18–7	14–16
New York Knicks	31	49	.388	31	15–20	9–21	7–8	10–20

=== Western Division ===
Western Division	W	L	PCT	GB	Home	Road	Neutral	Div
x-Los Angeles Lakers	49	31	.613	–	25–13	21–16	3–2	25–15
x-St. Louis Hawks	45	35	.563	4	26–4	15–17	4–4	28–12
x-Baltimore Bullets	37	43	.463	12	23–14	12–19	2–10	22–18
Detroit Pistons	31	49	.388	18	13–17	11–20	7–12	18–22
San Francisco Warriors	17	63	.213	32	10–26	5–31	2–6	7–33

x – clinched playoff spot

== Playoff bracket ==
Division Semifinals
E3	Philadelphia	3
E2	Cincinnati	1
W3	Baltimore	3
W2	St. Louis	1

Division Finals
Eastern Division
E1	Boston*	4
E3	Philadelphia	3
Western Division
W1	Los Angeles*	4
W3	Baltimore	2

NBA Finals
E1	Boston*	4
W1	Los Angeles*	1

- * Division winner
- Bold Series winner
- Italic Team with home-court advantage in NBA Finals

== Statistics leaders ==
Category	Player	Team	Stat
Points	Wilt Chamberlain	San Francisco Warriors/Philadelphia 76ers	2,534
Rebounds	Bill Russell	Boston Celtics	1,878
Assists	Oscar Robertson	Cincinnati Royals	861
FG%	Wilt Chamberlain	San Francisco Warriors/Philadelphia 76ers	.510
FT%	Larry Costello	Philadelphia 76ers	.877

Note: Prior to the 1969–70 season, league leaders in points, rebounds, and assists were determined by totals rather than averages.

== NBA awards ==
- Most Valuable Player: Bill Russell, Boston Celtics
- Rookie of the Year: Willis Reed, New York Knicks
- Coach of the Year: Red Auerbach, Boston Celtics
- All-NBA First Team:
  - F – Elgin Baylor, Los Angeles Lakers
  - F – Jerry Lucas, Cincinnati Royals
  - C – Bill Russell, Boston Celtics
  - G – Oscar Robertson, Cincinnati Royals
  - G – Jerry West, Los Angeles Lakers
- All-NBA Second Team:
  - F – Bob Pettit, St. Louis Hawks
  - F – Gus Johnson, Baltimore Bullets
  - C – Wilt Chamberlain, Philadelphia 76ers
  - G – Hal Greer, Philadelphia 76ers
  - G – Sam Jones, Boston Celtics
- NBA All-Rookie First Team:
  - Jim Barnes, New York Knicks
  - Willis Reed, New York Knicks
  - Wali Jones, Baltimore Bullets
  - Howard Komives, New York Knicks
  - Joe Caldwell, Detroit Pistons
  - Lucious Jackson, Philadelphia 76ers

== See also ==
- List of NBA regular season records
