= 1964–65 Philadelphia 76ers season =

Season of National Basketball Association team the Philadelphia 76ers

- Head coach: Dolph Schayes
- General manager: Irv Kosloff
- Owner: Irv Kosloff
- Arena: Municipal Auditorium

Results
- Record: 40–40 (.500)
- Place: Division: 3rd (Eastern)
- Playoff finish: Division finals (lost to Celtics 3–4)
- Stats at Basketball Reference

Local media
- Television: WFIL-TV
- Radio: WCAU

The 1964–65 Philadelphia 76ers season was the 76ers 16th season in the NBA and 2nd season in Philadelphia. The team made a major trade to obtain the services of Wilt Chamberlain during the middle of the season. In the playoffs, they took the Boston Celtics to a 7th and decisive game. With the Sixers down 110-109 & only 5 seconds on the clock, Hal Greer inbounded the ball, and John Havlicek made a play for the ages when he stole the inbound pass, and the Celtics went on to win the game, and eventually their 7th consecutive championship.

== Roster ==
1964–65 Philadelphia 76ers roster
Players

Pos.	No.	Player	Height	Weight	DOB	From
G	24	Al Bianchi	6 ft 3 in (1.91 m)	185 lb (84 kg)	1932-03-26	Bowling Green
C	13	Wilt Chamberlain	7 ft 1 in (2.16 m)	275 lb (125 kg)	1936-08-21	Kansas
G	21	Larry Costello	6 ft 1 in (1.85 m)	186 lb (84 kg)	1931-07-02	Niagara
G	5	Steve Courtin	6 ft 1 in (1.85 m)	188 lb (85 kg)	1942-09-21	Saint Joseph's
C	26	Connie Dierking	6 ft 9 in (2.06 m)	222 lb (101 kg)	1936-10-02	Cincinnati
F	20	Dave Gambee	6 ft 6 in (1.98 m)	215 lb (98 kg)	1937-04-16	Oregon State
G	22	Jerry Greenspan	6 ft 5 in (1.96 m)	195 lb (88 kg)	1941-11-22	Maryland
G	15	Hal Greer	6 ft 2 in (1.88 m)	175 lb (79 kg)	1936-06-26	Marshall
F	54	Lucious Jackson	6 ft 9 in (2.06 m)	240 lb (109 kg)	1941-10-31	UTRGV
G	12	Larry Jones	6 ft 2 in (1.88 m)	180 lb (82 kg)	1942-09-22	Toledo
C	10	Red Kerr	6 ft 9 in (2.06 m)	230 lb (104 kg)	1932-07-17	Illinois
G	5	Paul Neumann	6 ft 1 in (1.85 m)	175 lb (79 kg)	1938-01-30	Stanford
F	25	Chet Walker	6 ft 6 in (1.98 m)	212 lb (96 kg)	1940-02-22	Bradley
F	14	Ben Warley	6 ft 5 in (1.96 m)	200 lb (91 kg)	1936-09-04	Tennessee State

Coaches
Head coach
- Dolph Schayes

Legend
- (DP) Unsigned draft pick
- (FA) Free agent
- (S) Suspended
- Injured

Roster
Updated: January 22, 1965

== Regular season ==
=== Season standings ===
Eastern Division	W	L	PCT	GB	Home	Road	Neutral	Div
x-Boston Celtics	62	18	.775	–	27–3	27–11	8–4	20–10
x-Cincinnati Royals	48	32	.600	14	25–7	17–21	6–4	16–14
x-Philadelphia 76ers	40	40	.500	22	13–12	9–21	18–7	14–16
New York Knicks	31	49	.388	31	15–20	9–21	7–8	10–20

x – clinched playoff spot

=== Game log ===
1964–65 game log
#	Date	Opponent	Score	High points	Record
1	October 16	Detroit	113–125	Hal Greer (32)	1–0
2	October 22	Baltimore	138–135 (OT)	Hal Greer (29)	1–1
3	October 24	@ St. Louis	86–126	Hal Greer (16)	1–2
4	October 25	@ Cincinnati	107–109	Chet Walker (28)	1–3
5	October 27	N St. Louis	81–100	Costello, Dierking (18)	2–3
6	October 30	@ New York	90–94	Johnny Kerr (18)	2–4
7	October 31	New York	105–116	Connie Dierking (21)	3–4
8	November 7	Cincinnati	103–105	Lucious Jackson (22)	4–4
9	November 10	San Francisco	110–99	Chet Walker (18)	4–5
10	November 11	@ Baltimore	123–114	Hal Greer (36)	5–5
11	November 12	N Boston	110–109	Lucious Jackson (27)	6–5
12	November 14	Boston	113–102	Lucious Jackson (20)	6–6
13	November 17	@ St. Louis	107–114	Hal Greer (23)	6–7
14	November 18	@ Detroit	111–124	Hal Greer (26)	6–8
15	November 20	St. Louis	118–115	Lucious Jackson (20)	6–9
16	November 21	N Boston	108–96	Hal Greer (33)	7–9
17	November 25	N New York	124–93	Hal Greer (23)	8–9
18	November 26	San Francisco	117–128	Hal Greer (26)	9–9
19	November 27	@ Cincinnati	112–133	Paul Neumann (18)	9–10
20	November 28	@ Detroit	101–93	Johnny Kerr (25)	10–10
21	November 29	@ St. Louis	97–94	Lucious Jackson (20)	11–10
22	December 1	Los Angeles	118–117	Larry Costello (23)	11–11
23	December 4	Detroit	106–119	Paul Neumann (25)	12–11
24	December 5	N Baltimore	125–108	Dave Gambee (22)	13–11
25	December 6	N Los Angeles	104–109	Paul Neumann (23)	13–12
26	December 8	N Baltimore	102–97	Hal Greer (26)	14–12
27	December 11	Boston	118–109	Lucious Jackson (23)	14–13
28	December 12	@ New York	106–133	Paul Neumann (24)	14–14
29	December 13	N New York	121–115	Hal Greer (34)	15–14
30	December 14	N San Francisco	112–119	Hal Greer (31)	16–14
31	December 16	@ Baltimore	120–140	Paul Neumann (21)	16–15
32	December 18	@ San Francisco	111–117	Gambee, Neumann (17)	16–16
33	December 19	@ Los Angeles	140–113	Chet Walker (20)	17–16
34	December 20	@ San Francisco	113–111	Hal Greer (30)	18–16
35	December 23	@ Los Angeles	117–135	Lucious Jackson (21)	18–17
36	December 26	Cincinnati	135–125	Paul Neumann (22)	18–18
37	December 30	Los Angeles	115–117	Gambee, Jackson (24)	19–18
38	January 6	N San Francisco	102–121	Larry Costello (25)	20–18
39	January 8	N Cincinnati	107–114	Lucious Jackson (22)	20–19
40	January 9	@ St. Louis	104–102	Hal Greer (25)	21–19
41	January 11	N St. Louis	100–90	Lucious Jackson (21)	21–20
42	January 14	Baltimore	138–126	Hal Greer (24)	21–21
43	January 15	@ Boston	95–104	Chet Walker (30)	21–22
44	January 18	N Detroit	109–95	Hal Greer (28)	22–22
45	January 19	N Detroit	97–103	Hal Greer (22)	22–23
46	January 21	San Francisco	102–111	Hal Greer (28)	23–23
47	January 22	N Detroit	109–103 (OT)	Hal Greer (24)	24–23
48	January 23	N Boston	104–100	Lucious Jackson (26)	25–23
49	January 26	N Detroit	105–107	Hal Greer (26)	25–24
50	January 27	@ Boston	98–115	Wilt Chamberlain (28)	25–25
51	January 29	Boston	105–118	Hal Greer (31)	26–25
52	January 31	Cincinnati	122–127	Wilt Chamberlain (36)	27–25
53	February 2	N St. Louis	105–119	Chamberlain, Greer (24)	28–25
54	February 3	N New York	116–95	Wilt Chamberlain (29)	29–25
55	February 4	St. Louis	119–123	Wilt Chamberlain (35)	30–25
56	February 6	N Cincinnati	127–122	Wilt Chamberlain (31)	31–25
57	February 8	@ Los Angeles	98–117	Jackson, Walker (18)	31–26
58	February 9	N San Francisco	114–132	Wilt Chamberlain (33)	32–26
59	February 10	@ Los Angeles	110–99	Wilt Chamberlain (31)	33–26
60	February 11	@ San Francisco	100–106	Wilt Chamberlain (24)	33–27
61	February 13	@ Cincinnati	106–108	Wilt Chamberlain (37)	33–28
62	February 18	Los Angeles	117–110	Wilt Chamberlain (40)	33–29
63	February 20	N New York	111–92	Wilt Chamberlain (37)	34–29
64	February 21	@ Baltimore	107–106	Wilt Chamberlain (40)	35–29
65	February 22	N Baltimore	122–112	Wilt Chamberlain (35)	36–29
66	February 23	@ New York	104–132	Wilt Chamberlain (30)	36–30
67	February 24	@ Detroit	104–106	Wilt Chamberlain (32)	36–31
68	February 28	N Los Angeles	118–122	Wilt Chamberlain (34)	36–32
69	March 2	N Los Angeles	117–126	Hal Greer (24)	36–33
70	March 3	@ St. Louis	110–124	Wilt Chamberlain (31)	36–34
71	March 5	@ Cincinnati	110–109	Wilt Chamberlain (48)	37–34
72	March 6	Boston	98–103	Wilt Chamberlain (27)	38–34
73	March 7	@ Boston	111–133	Wilt Chamberlain (27)	38–35
74	March 9	@ New York	122–124 (OT)	Wilt Chamberlain (37)	38–36
75	March 10	New York	134–123	Wilt Chamberlain (27)	38–37
76	March 13	Detroit	116–131	Wilt Chamberlain (31)	39–37
77	March 14	@ Baltimore	126–143	Wilt Chamberlain (51)	39–38
78	March 16	San Francisco	115–107	Wilt Chamberlain (34)	39–39
79	March 20	Cincinnati	125–122	Hal Greer (31)	39–40
80	March 21	Baltimore	105–127	Hal Greer (26)	40–40

== Playoffs ==
1965 playoff game log
Division semifinals: 3–1 (home: 1–1; road: 2–0)

Game	Date	Team	Score	High points	High rebounds	High assists	Location Attendance	Series
1	March 24	@ Cincinnati	W 119–117 (OT)	Hal Greer (37)	Wilt Chamberlain (23)	Greer, Kerr (6)	Cincinnati Gardens; 6,422	1–0
2	March 26	Cincinnati	L 120–121	Wilt Chamberlain (30)	Wilt Chamberlain (15)	Wilt Chamberlain (10)	Municipal Auditorium; 5,801	1–1
3	March 28	@ Cincinnati	W 108–94	Hal Greer (30)	Wilt Chamberlain (15)	Wilt Chamberlain (6)	Cincinnati Gardens; 6,289	2–1
4	March 31	Cincinnati	W 119–112	Wilt Chamberlain (38)	Wilt Chamberlain (26)	Hal Greer (7)	Municipal Auditorium; 7,451	3–1

Division finals: 3–4 (home: 3–0; road: 0–4)

Game	Date	Team	Score	High points	High rebounds	High assists	Location Attendance	Series
1	April 4	@ Boston	L 98–108	Wilt Chamberlain (33)	Wilt Chamberlain (31)	three players tied (3)	Boston Garden; 13,909	0–1
2	April 6	Boston	W 109–103	Wilt Chamberlain (30)	Wilt Chamberlain (39)	Wilt Chamberlain (8)	Municipal Auditorium; 9,790	1–1
3	April 8	@ Boston	L 94–112	Wilt Chamberlain (24)	Wilt Chamberlain (37)	Hal Greer (4)	Boston Garden; 13,909	1–2
4	April 9	Boston	W 134–131 (OT)	Wilt Chamberlain (34)	Wilt Chamberlain (34)	Costello, Kerr (5)	Municipal Auditorium; 9,294	2–2
5	April 11	@ Boston	L 108–114	Wilt Chamberlain (30)	Wilt Chamberlain (21)	Hal Greer (4)	Boston Garden; 13,909	2–3
6	April 13	Boston	W 112–106	Wilt Chamberlain (30)	Wilt Chamberlain (26)	Larry Costello (6)	Municipal Auditorium; 11,182	3–3
7	April 15	@ Boston	L 109–110	Wilt Chamberlain (30)	Wilt Chamberlain (32)	Hal Greer (9)	Boston Garden; 13,909	3–4

1965 schedule

== Awards and records ==
- Hal Greer, All-NBA Second Team
- Wilt Chamberlain, All-NBA Second Team
- Lucious Jackson, NBA All-Rookie Team 1st Team
