= Philadelphia 76ers accomplishments and records =

This page details the all-time statistics, records, and other achievements pertaining to the Philadelphia 76ers.

== Individual awards ==
NBA MVP

- Wilt Chamberlain – 1966–1968
- Julius Erving – 1981
- Moses Malone – 1983
- Allen Iverson – 2001
- Joel Embiid – 2023

NBA Finals MVP

- Moses Malone – 1983

NBA Defensive Player of the Year

- Dikembe Mutombo – 2001

NBA Rookie of the Year

- Allen Iverson – 1997
- Michael Carter-Williams – 2014
- Ben Simmons – 2018

NBA Sixth Man of the Year

- Bobby Jones – 1983
- Aaron McKie – 2001

NBA Most Improved Player of the Year

- Dana Barros – 1995
- Tyrese Maxey – 2024

NBA Coach of the Year

- Dolph Schayes – 1966
- Larry Brown – 2001

NBA Sportsmanship Award

- Eric Snow – 2000
- Tyrese Maxey – 2024

J. Walter Kennedy Citizenship Award

- Julius Erving – 1983
- Dikembe Mutombo – 2001
- Samuel Dalembert – 2010

NBA Hustle Award

- Amir Johnson – 2018

NBA scoring champion

- Wilt Chamberlain – 1965, 1966
- Allen Iverson – 1999, 2001, 2002, 2005
- Joel Embiid – 2022, 2023

NBA All-Star Game head coaches

- Al Cervi – 1952, 1955
- Alex Hannum – 1968
- Gene Shue – 1977
- Billy Cunningham – 1978, 1980, 1981, 1983
- Larry Brown – 2000
- Doc Rivers – 2021

All-NBA First Team

- Dolph Schayes – 1952–1955, 1957, 1958
- Wilt Chamberlain – 1966–1968
- Billy Cunningham – 1969–1971
- George McGinnis – 1976
- Julius Erving – 1978, 1980–1983
- Moses Malone – 1983, 1985
- Charles Barkley – 1988–1991
- Allen Iverson – 1999, 2001, 2005
- Joel Embiid – 2023

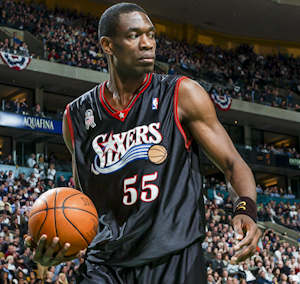
Dikembe Mutombo was known for his defense and hustle with his time with the Sixers

All-NBA Second Team

- Al Cervi – 1950
- Dolph Schayes – 1950, 1951, 1956, 1959–1961
- Paul Seymour – 1954, 1955
- Larry Costello – 1961
- Hal Greer – 1963–1969
- Wilt Chamberlain – 1965
- Billy Cunningham – 1972
- George McGinnis – 1977
- Julius Erving – 1977, 1984
- Moses Malone – 1984
- Charles Barkley – 1986, 1987, 1992
- Allen Iverson – 2000, 2002, 2003
- Dikembe Mutombo – 2001
- Joel Embiid – 2018, 2019, 2021, 2022

All-NBA Third Team

- Dikembe Mutombo – 2002
- Allen Iverson – 2006
- Ben Simmons – 2020
- Tyrese Maxey – 2026

NBA All-Defensive First Team

- Bobby Jones – 1979–1984
- Caldwell Jones – 1981, 1982
- Maurice Cheeks – 1983–1986
- Moses Malone – 1983
- Dikembe Mutombo – 2001
- Robert Covington – 2018
- Ben Simmons – 2020, 2021

NBA All-Defensive Second Team

- Bobby Jones – 1985
- Maurice Cheeks – 1987
- Rick Mahorn – 1990
- Theo Ratliff – 1999
- Dikembe Mutombo – 2002
- Eric Snow – 2003
- Andre Iguodala – 2011
- Joel Embiid – 2018, 2019, 2021
- Matisse Thybulle – 2021, 2022

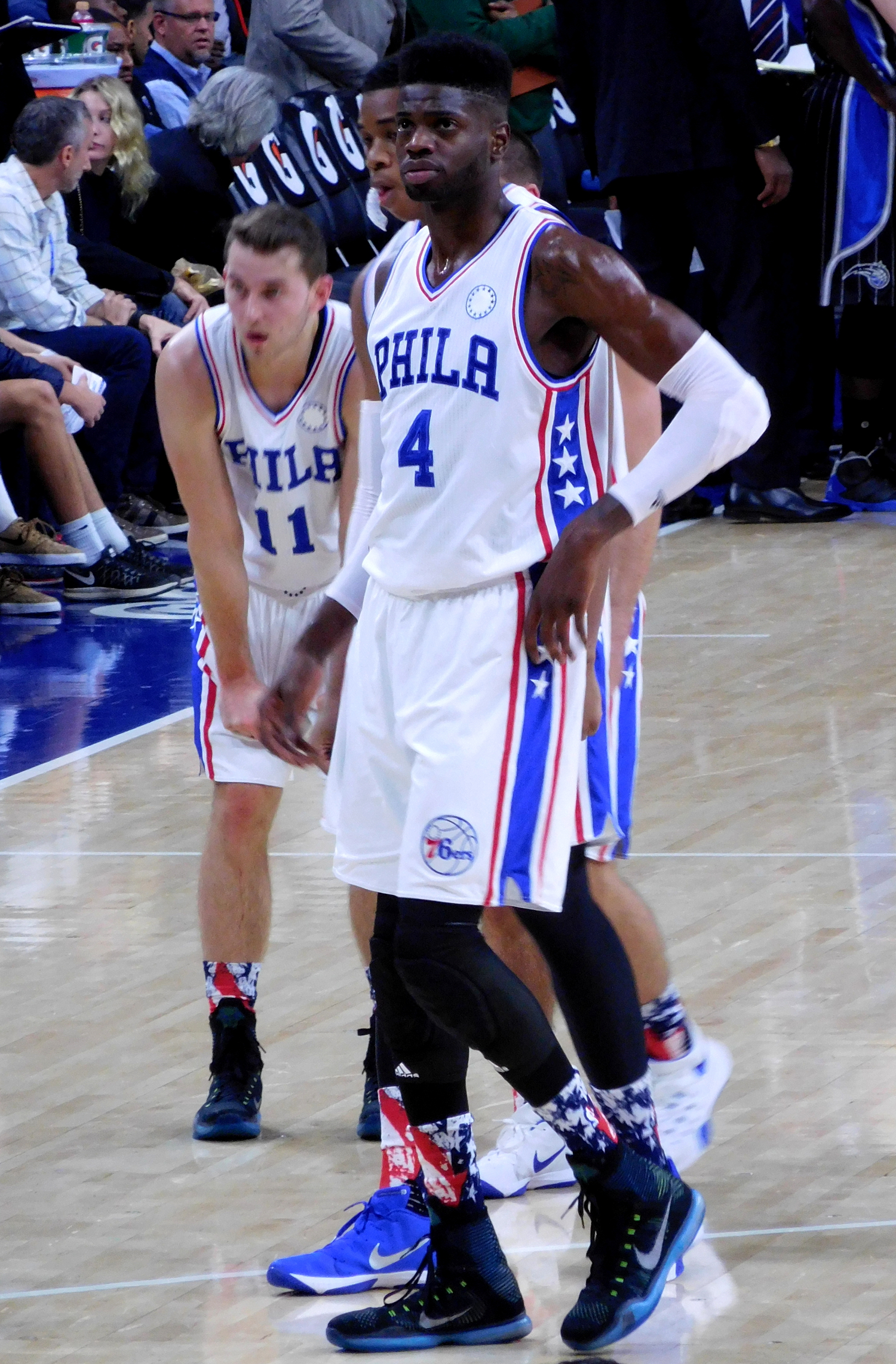
Nerlens Noel in 2015

NBA All-Rookie First Team

- Lucious Jackson – 1965
- Billy Cunningham – 1966
- Fred Boyd – 1973
- Charles Barkley – 1985
- Hersey Hawkins – 1989
- Jerry Stackhouse – 1996
- Allen Iverson – 1997
- Andre Iguodala – 2005
- Michael Carter-Williams – 2014
- Nerlens Noel – 2015
- Jahlil Okafor – 2016
- Joel Embiid – 2017
- Dario Šarić – 2017
- Ben Simmons – 2018
- V. J. Edgecombe – 2026

NBA All-Rookie Second Team

- Clarence Weatherspoon – 1993
- Shawn Bradley – 1994
- Sharone Wright – 1995
- Tim Thomas – 1998
- Thaddeus Young – 2008

== Franchise leaders ==
Bold denotes still active with team.

Italic denotes still active but not with team.

=== Points scored (regular season) (as of the beginning of the 2026–27 season) ===
1. Hal Greer (21,586)
2. Allen Iverson (19,931)
3. Dolph Schayes (18,438)
4. Julius Erving (18,364)
5. Charles Barkley (14,184)
6. **Joel Embiid** (13,830)
7. Billy Cunningham (13,626)
8. Red Kerr (11,699)
9. Maurice Cheeks (10,429)
10. Andre Iguodala (9,422)
11. Chet Walker (9,043)
12. **Tyrese Maxey** (8,597)
13. Larry Costello (7,957)
14. Fred Carter (7,673)
15. Hersey Hawkins (7,657)
16. Wilt Chamberlain (7,651)
17. Steve Mix (7,559)
18. Moses Malone (7,511)
19. Andrew Toney (7,458)
20. Doug Collins (7,427)
21. Thaddeus Young (7,078)
22. Clarence Weatherspoon (6,867)
23. Tobias Harris (6,659)
24. Bobby Jones (6,585)
25. Paul Seymour (5,760)
26. Al Bianchi (5,550)
27. Dave Gambee (5,454)
28. Wali Jones (5,229)
29. Lucious Jackson (5,170)
30. Lou Williams (5,158)
31. Ron Anderson (5,138)
32. George McGinnis (5,046)
33. Darryl Dawkins (5,009)
34. Samuel Dalembert (4,710)
35. Ben Simmons (4,382)
36. Archie Clark (4,381)
37. Eric Snow (4,375)
38. Aaron McKie (4,143)
39. Jrue Holiday (3,994)
40. Willie Green (3,954)
41. Derrick Coleman (3,943)
42. Robert Covington (3,939)
43. George King (3,609)
44. Mike Gminski (3,585)
45. Kyle Korver (3,527)
46. Andre Miller (3,510)
47. Caldwell Jones (3,466)
48. Earl Lloyd (3,432)
49. Jerry Stackhouse (3,416)
50. Johnny Dawkins (3,343)

=== Other statistics (regular season) (as of the beginning of the 2026–27 season) ===
Most minutes played
Player	Minutes
Hal Greer	39,788
Allen Iverson	29,879
Dolph Schayes	29,800
Julius Erving	28,677
Maurice Cheeks	28,583
Red Kerr	26,014
Andre Iguodala	23,216
Charles Barkley	22,761
Billy Cunningham	22,406
Larry Costello	18,624

Most rebounds
Player	Rebounds
Dolph Schayes	11,256
Red Kerr	9,506
Charles Barkley	7,079
Billy Cunningham	6,638
Wilt Chamberlain	6,632
Hal Greer	5,665
Julius Erving	5,601
**Joel Embiid**	5,405
Samuel Dalembert	4,844
Luke Jackson	4,613

Most assists
Player	Assists
Maurice Cheeks	6,212
Hal Greer	4,540
Allen Iverson	4,385
Julius Erving	3,224
Dolph Schayes	3,072
Andre Iguodala	2,991
Eric Snow	2,965
Larry Costello	2,901
Billy Cunningham	2,625
Paul Seymour	2,335

Most steals
Player	Steals
Maurice Cheeks	1,942
Allen Iverson	1,644
Julius Erving	1,508
Andre Iguodala	1,076
Charles Barkley	1,007
Steve Mix	851
Bobby Jones	727
Hersey Hawkins	722
Thaddeus Young	708
Eric Snow	702

Most blocks
Player	Blocks
Julius Erving	1,293
Samuel Dalembert	1,131
Caldwell Jones	926
**Joel Embiid**	798
Theo Ratliff	757
Bobby Jones	694
Darryl Dawkins	635
Charles Barkley	606
Manute Bol	580
Clarence Weatherspoon	496

Most three-pointers made
Player	3-pointers made
**Tyrese Maxey**	957
Allen Iverson	885
Robert Covington	724
Kyle Korver	661
**Joel Embiid**	591
Tobias Harris	575
Andre Iguodala	563
Hersey Hawkins	476
JJ Redick	433
Furkan Korkmaz	405

== Team awards and records ==
=== Awards ===
NBA champions

- 3 – 1955, 1967, 1983

Eastern Conference champions

- 9 – 1950, 1954, 1955, 1967, 1977, 1980, 1982, 1983, 2001

Atlantic Division Champions

- 6 – 1977, 1978, 1983, 1990, 2001, 2021

=== Individual game records ===
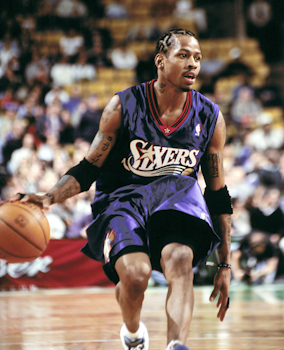
Allen Iverson dribbling in 2001

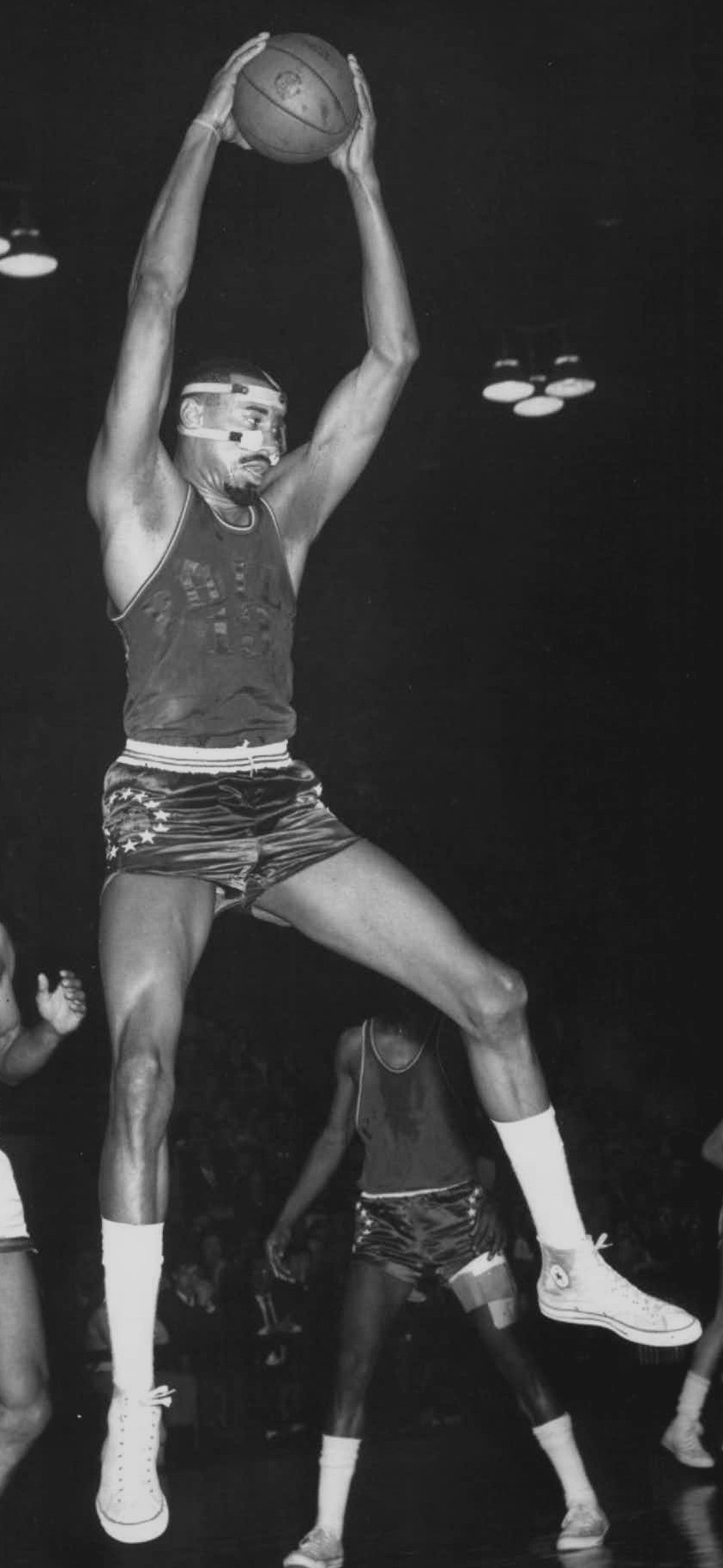
Wilt Chamberlain grabbing a rebound in 1964

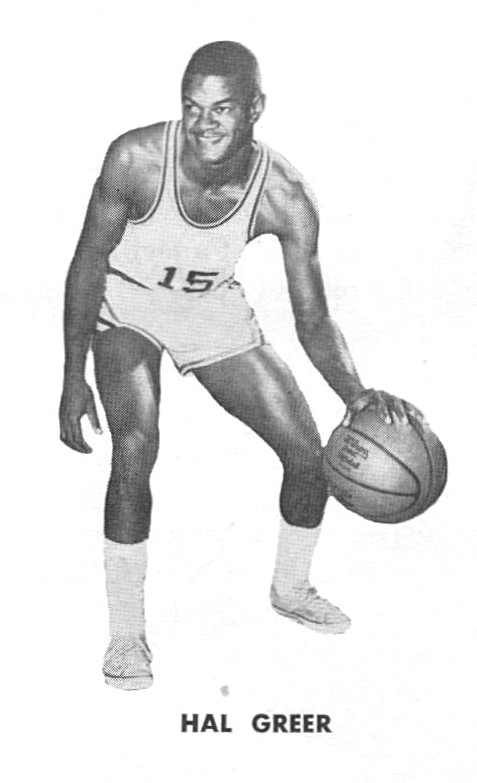
Hal Greer in 1963

Game highs
Stat	Amount	Player	Date
Points full game	70	Joel Embiid	1/22/24
Points half	39	Wilt Chamberlain	2/7/66
Made field goals game	30	Wilt Chamberlain	12/16/67
Made field goals half	18	Hal Greer	2/14/59
Attempted field goals game	43	Wilt Chamberlain	2/7/66
Attempted field goal half	23	Hal Greer	2/21/64
Most 3 pt field goals made	9	Dana Barros & Danny Green	1/27/95 & 1/12/21
Most 3 pt field goals attempted	17	Vernon Maxwell & Robert Covington	4/8/96 & 4/10/16
Most free throws made game	24	Willie Burton & Allen Iverson	12/13/94 & 2/12/05
Most assists game	21	Wilt Chamberlain & Maurice Cheeks	2/2/68 & 10/30/82
Most rebounds game	43	Wilt Chamberlain	3/6/65
Most blocks game	10	Harvey Catchings, Manute Bol & Dikembe Mutombo	3/21/75, 2/14/91 & 12/1/02

== All-Star Game selections ==
The following Nationals and 76ers players were selected to the NBA All-Star Game.

- Dolph Schayes – 1951–1962
- Red Rocha – 1951, 1952
- Billy Gabor – 1953
- Paul Seymour – 1953, 1954, 1955
- Johnny Kerr – 1956, 1959, 1963
- Larry Costello – 1958–1962, 1965
- George Yardley – 1960
- Hal Greer – 1961–1970
- Lee Shaffer – 1963
- Chet Walker – 1964, 1966, 1967
- Lucious Jackson – 1965
- Wilt Chamberlain – 1966, 1967, 1968
- Billy Cunningham – 1969–1972
- John Block – 1973
- Steve Mix – 1975
- Doug Collins – 1976–1979
- George McGinnis – 1976, 1977
- Julius Erving – 1977–1987
- Bobby Jones – 1981, 1982
- Maurice Cheeks – 1983, 1986, 1987, 1988
- Moses Malone – 1983–1986
- Andrew Toney – 1983, 1984
- Charles Barkley – 1987–1992
- Hersey Hawkins – 1991
- Dana Barros – 1995
- Allen Iverson – 2000–2006, 2010
- Theo Ratliff – 2001
- Dikembe Mutombo – 2002
- Andre Iguodala – 2012
- Jrue Holiday – 2013
- Joel Embiid – 2018–2024
- Ben Simmons – 2019, 2020, 2021
- James Harden – 2022
- Tyrese Maxey – 2024, 2026

== See also ==
- NBA records
