= 1972–73 Carolina Cougars season =

ABA basketball team season

- Division champions
- Head coach: Larry Brown
- Arena: Greensboro Coliseum; Charlotte Coliseum; Dorton Arena

Results
- Record: 57–27 (.679)
- Place: Division: 1st (Eastern)
- Playoff finish: Lost in the Eastern Division Finals

Local media
- Television: WSJS 12
- Radio: WSOC

The 1972–73 Carolina Cougars season was the fourth season of the Cougars in the American Basketball Association and sixth overall when including their two seasons of play as the Houston Mavericks. The Cougars finished the season being second in points per game with 115.6 points per game and fifth in points allowed with 110.7 points per game. By the time the season was halfway over with, the Cougars were 28–14, with a season best eleven game winning streak occurring during that span, while they finished the season with a 29–13 record in the second half. Their biggest losing streak in the season was 4 games long, which occurred after they had already won over 50 games in the season. They clinched the best record in the Eastern Division (and later, the best record in the ABA this season) after beating the newly created San Diego Conquistadors expansion franchise on March 25, 1973; with their 57th victory, their best record in franchise history is tied for the 9th-best record by a team in one ABA season. In the playoffs, they beat the New York Nets in five games to go to the Division Finals with a chance to go to the ABA Finals under head coach Larry Brown. However, the Cougars failed to advance that far, losing to the Kentucky Colonels in seven games, with the final game being in their home court, though controversially deciding to play their final playoff home game in Charlotte instead of Greensboro, which was where they had played most of their games in at the time.

During the regular season, the Cougars played 28 games in Greensboro, 13 in Charlotte, and 2 in Raleigh; in the playoffs, the team played 4 games in Greensboro, 2 in Charlotte (including their Game 7 defeat in the Eastern Division Finals), and one in Raleigh.

== ABA Draft ==
Weirdly enough, as of 2025, there has been no official draft records for the first five rounds of the 1972 ABA draft specifically, while every other round after that point has been properly recorded by basketball historians otherwise. Because of the strange dispersity of draft picks not being properly recorded this year after previously being fully recorded in the previous year's draft and the number of rounds potentially being off for even the players being selected this year, the recorded players selected in this year's draft will be marked with a ? for the pick number in particular (as well as certain round numbers, if necessary) in order to showcase the awkward display currently going on with the 1972 ABA draft year in particular (though what is known is that the Cougars were the official new holders of the #2 pick in the draft after the Memphis Pros were forced to forfeit their original #2 pick slot in the draft after they signed Larry Cannon from the Denver Rockets in a manner that didn't suit the ABA's desires sometime after the 1971 ABA draft ended). However, if any changes come up to where a proper, official recording of the 1972 ABA draft gets released displaying both pick numbers and round numbers for where certain players got selected, please provide the updated (potential) draft ordering with a source confirming the round and pick numbers included here.

Round	Pick	Player	Position(s)	Nationality	College
1	2	Tom Riker	PF/C	United States	South Carolina
2	10	Dennis Wuycik	SF	United States	North Carolina
4(?)	29(?)	Fred Boyd	PG/SG	United States	Oregon State
6	45(?)	Steve Bracey	PG	United States	Tulsa
7	56(?)	Dan Holcomb	C	United States	Memphis State
8	67(?)	Henry Bibby	PG	United States	UCLA
9	78(?)	Jerry Crocker	G	United States	Guilford College
10	89(?)	Mike Collins	F	United States	Seattle
11	100(?)	Wilbert Loftin	F	United States	Southwest Louisiana
12	111(?)	Charles Dudley	PG	United States	Washington
13	122(?)	Mike Sneed	F	United States	Fayetteville State
14	133(?)	Steve Previs	PG	United States	North Carolina
15	144(?)	Kent Martens	C	United States	Abilene Christian
16	153(?)	Rod Behrans	PF	United States	Samford
17	162(?)	Dave Smith	G	United States	Western Carolina
18	170(?)	Curtis Pritchett	F	United States	St. Augustine's College
19	174(?)	Paul Coder	C	United States	North Carolina State

The Cougars would potentially trade away not just their third round pick, but also their fifth round pick to the New York Nets in this draft.

=== ABA Dispersal Draft ===
Months after the original ABA draft for this year concluded, the ABA held their first ever dispersal draft on July 13, 1972 after it was found out by the ABA itself that neither "The Floridians" nor the Pittsburgh Condors would be able to continue operations either in their original locations or elsewhere in the U.S.A. (or even Canada in the case of "The Floridians"). Unlike the main draft they did during the months of March and April, this draft would last for only six rounds as a one day deal and would have the nine remaining inaugural ABA teams selecting players that were left over at the time from both "The Floridians" and Pittsburgh Condors franchises (including draft picks from both teams there) and obtain their player rights from there. Any players from either franchise that wouldn't be selected during this draft would be placed on waivers and enter free agency afterward. Interestingly, the Cougars would be the only Eastern Division team from the previous season, as well as one of four teams alongside the Dallas Chaparrals, Denver Rockets, and Memphis Pros turned Memphis Tams to use two different first round picks at once instead of just having only one first round pick like most other teams in this draft. Even so, the following players were either Floridians or Condors players that the Cougars acquired during this dispersal draft.

Round	Pick	Player	Position(s)	Nationality	College	ABA Team
1	3	Mike Lewis	PF/C	United States	Duke	Pittsburgh Condors
1	6	Mack Calvin	PG	United States	USC	The Floridians
2	16	Mike Stewart	C	United States	Santa Clara	The Floridians
3	24	Mike Grosso	C	United States	Louisville	Pittsburgh Condors
4	32	Greg Starrick	G	United States	Southern Illinois	The Floridians

Funnily enough, three of the team's five selections from this draft would have the first name of Mike on their squad, with two of them being players from the Pittsburgh Condors. For the Mikes in question, Mike Lewis would be the only player out of the three in question to actually play for the Cougars after being selected by them; the other two players named Mike, Mike Stewart and Mike Grosso, would never play for the franchise whatsoever, with Stewart going back to college for his senior year at Santa Clara University before never playing for either the ABA or the rivaling NBA (instead going for the Western Basketball League before playing overseas) and Grosso ultimately retiring from ABA play after being selected by Carolina. Meanwhile, one of "The Floridians" players that the Cougars selected in this draft, Mack Calvin, would later end up becoming one of two players selected from the dispersal draft to end up being members of the ABA All-Time Team (the other being Calvin's now former teammate from "The Floridians" franchise, Warren Jabali, who was selected as the second overall pick of that draft for the Denver Rockets). Finally, the last pick the Cougars made in this draft, Greg Starrick, would end up never playing professional basketball at all.

== Roster ==
1972–73 Carolina Cougars roster
Players

Pos.	No.	Player	Height	Weight	DOB	From
C	54	Roger Brown	6 ft 11 in (2.11 m)	225 lb (102 kg)	February 23, 1950	Kansas
SF	27	Joe Caldwell	6 ft 5 in (1.96 m)	195 lb (88 kg)	November 1, 1941	Arizona State
PG	20	Mack Calvin	6 ft 0 in (1.83 m)	165 lb (75 kg)	July 27, 1947	USC
PF	32	Billy Cunningham	6 ft 6 in (1.98 m)	210 lb (95 kg)	June 3, 1943	North Carolina
C	33	Ira Harge	6 ft 9 in (2.06 m)	225 lb (102 kg)	March 14, 1941	New Mexico
SG	21	Steve Jones	6 ft 5 in (1.96 m)	205 lb (93 kg)	October 17, 1942	Oregon
C	42	Mike Lewis	6 ft 8 in (2.03 m)	225 lb (102 kg)	March 18, 1946	Duke
PG	23	Gene Littles	6 ft 0 in (1.83 m)	160 lb (73 kg)	June 29, 1943	High Point
PF	22	Ed Manning	6 ft 7 in (2.01 m)	210 lb (95 kg)	January 2, 1944	Jackson State
SG	24	Ted McClain	6 ft 1 in (1.85 m)	180 lb (82 kg)	August 30, 1946	Tennessee State
C	52	Tom Owens	6 ft 10 in (2.08 m)	215 lb (98 kg)	June 28, 1949	South Carolina
PG	14	Steve Previs	6 ft 3 in (1.91 m)	183 lb (83 kg)	February 9, 1950	North Carolina
SG	21	Bob Warren	6 ft 5 in (1.96 m)	190 lb (86 kg)	July 17, 1946	Vanderbilt
SF	44	Dennis Wuycik	6 ft 6 in (1.98 m)	215 lb (98 kg)	March 29, 1950	North Carolina

Coaches
Head coach
- Larry Brown

Legend
- (DP) Unsigned draft pick
- (FA) Free agent
- (S) Suspended
- Injured

Roster

== Final standings ==
=== Eastern Division ===
Team	W	L	%	GB
Carolina Cougars	57	27	.679	-
Kentucky Colonels	56	28	.667	1
Virginia Squires	42	42	.500	15
New York Nets	30	54	.357	27
Memphis Tams	24	60	.286	33

== ABA Playoffs ==
ABA Eastern Division Semifinals

Game	Date	Location	Score	Record	Attendance
1	March 30	Greensboro (Carolina)	104–96	1–0	4,725
2	March 31	Raleigh (Carolina)	111–114	1–1	6,343
3	April 3	New York	101–91	2–1	8,418
4	April 5	New York	112–108	3–1	7,867
5	April 6	Greensboro (Carolina)	136–113	4–1	6,388

Cougars win series, 4–1

ABA Eastern Division Finals vs. Kentucky Colonels

Game	Date	Location	Score	Record	Attendance
1	April 11	Charlotte (Carolina)	103–113	0–1	9,165
2	April 14	Greensboro (Carolina)	125–105	1–1	5,103
3	April 16	Kentucky	94–108	1–2	10,422
4	April 18	Kentucky	102–91	2–2	16,238
5	April 20	Greensboro (Carolina)	112–107	3–2	11,988
6	April 21	Kentucky	100–119	3–3	16,892
7	April 24	Charlotte (Carolina)	96–107	3–4	10,231

Cougars lose series, 4–3

== Awards and honors ==
1973 ABA All-Star Game selections (game played on February 6, 1973)

- Mack Calvin
- Joe Caldwell
- Billy Cunningham
- ABA Most Valuable Player: Billy Cunningham (24.1 points per game, 12 rebounds per game, and 6.3 assists per game)
- ABA Coach of the Year: Larry Brown
- ABA Executive of the Year: Carl Scheer
- All-ABA First Team selection: Billy Cunningham
- All-ABA Second Team selection: Mack Calvin
- All-Defensive Team selection: Joe Caldwell
- All-Rookie Team selection: Dennis Wuycik
