= Don Smith (basketball, born 1951) =

American basketball player (1951–2004)

Personal information
- Born: October 10, 1951 Dayton, Ohio, U.S.
- Died: March 9, 2004 (aged 52) Dayton, Ohio, U.S.
- Listed height: 6 ft 0 in (1.83 m)
- Listed weight: 160 lb (73 kg)

Career information
- High school: Nettie Lee Roth (Dayton, Ohio)
- College: Dayton (1971–1974)
- NBA draft: 1974: 2nd round, 19th overall pick
- Drafted by: Philadelphia 76ers
- Playing career: 1974–1975
- Position: Point guard
- Number: 10

Career history
- 1974–1975: Philadelphia 76ers

Career highlights
- Third-team Parade All-American (1970)

Career NBA statistics
- Points: 283 (5.2 ppg)
- Rebounds: 30 (0.6 rpg)
- Assists: 47 (0.9 apg)
- Stats at NBA.com
- Stats at Basketball Reference

Donald Smith (October 10, 1951 – March 9, 2004) was an American professional basketball player.

Smith grew up in Dayton, Ohio, and was a star basketball player at Roth High School in Dayton. He attended the University of Dayton. In 1971–72 as a 6'0" guard, the sophomore had an immediate impact on the team, averaging 20.2 points per game with a .442 field goal percentage and an .861 free throw percentage.

As a junior, Smith averaged 23.4 points per game (tied for second in UD history) with a .451 field goal percentage and a then-UD record (currently second) .910 free throw percentage (111-for-122). He still holds the Flyers' single-game scoring record; he scored 52 points his junior season against Loyola University Chicago at Chicago Stadium, and he also had a 44-point game that season against Xavier University in which he was 20-for-25 from the field.

As a senior in 1973–74, Smith averaged 18.0 points per game but with a career-best .469 field goal percentage and an .888 free throw percentage as the Flyers, after consecutive 13–13 seasons, went 20-9 and advanced to the NCAA Tournament Sweet Sixteen. There, Smith scored 36 points in a memorable triple-overtime, 111–100 loss to the Bill Walton-led UCLA Bruins.

Smith ended his UD career with the career free throw percentage record of .886.

Smith was selected in the second round (19th overall) of the 1974 NBA draft by the Philadelphia 76ers. He played for the 76ers for just the 1974–75 season. He played in 54 games, averaging exactly 10 minutes per game, and averaged 5.2 points. His career-high scoring game came on March 8, 1975, with 19 points against the Washington Bullets. And remaining true to his college free throw shooting form, he made every one of his 21 free throw attempts.

In 1980, he was inducted into the University of Dayton Hall of Fame.

Smith had been on dialysis for two years and was on Ohio State University's waiting list for a kidney donor when, after being hospitalized for two weeks with heart problems, he died on March 9, 2004, at age 52. Smith had been seriously injured in an automobile accident several months earlier, and that may have contributed to his death. His wife, Katrina, who was also injured in the accident, survived him.

In 2004, Smith was named to the University of Dayton's All-Century Team.

== Career statistics ==
Legend
GP	Games played	GS	Games started	MPG	Minutes per game
FG%	Field goal percentage	3P%	3-point field goal percentage	FT%	Free throw percentage
RPG	Rebounds per game	APG	Assists per game	SPG	Steals per game
BPG	Blocks per game	PPG	Points per game	**Bold**	Career high

=== NBA ===
==== Regular season ====
Year	Team	GP	GS	MPG	FG%	FT%	RPG	APG	SPG	BPG	PPG
1974–75	Philadelphia	54	0	10.0	.408	1.000	.6	.9	.4	.1	5.2
