= Steve Mix =

American basketball player, coach, and broadcaster

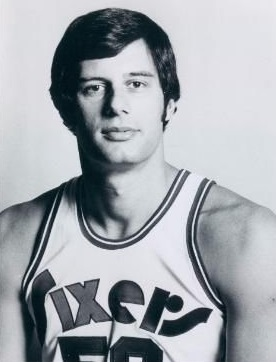
- Mix in 1979

Personal information
- Born: December 30, 1947 (age 78) Toledo, Ohio, U.S.
- Listed height: 6 ft 7 in (2.01 m)
- Listed weight: 215 lb (98 kg)

Career information
- High school: Rogers (Toledo, Ohio)
- College: Toledo (1966–1969)
- NBA draft: 1969: 5th round, 61st overall pick
- Drafted by: Detroit Pistons
- Playing career: 1969–1983
- Position: Small forward
- Number: 23, 50
- Coaching career: 1984–2014

Career history

Playing
- 1969–1971: Detroit Pistons
- 1971: Denver Rockets
- 1972–1973: Grand Rapids Tackers
- 1973–1982: Philadelphia 76ers
- 1982–1983: Milwaukee Bucks
- 1983: Los Angeles Lakers

Coaching
- 1984–1985: Toledo (women)
- 2012–2014: Trine (women)

Career highlights
- NBA All-Star (1975); MAC Player of the Year (1969); 3× First-team All-MAC (1967–1969); No. 50 retired by Toledo Rockets

Career NBA and ABA statistics
- Points: 8,357 (10.6 ppg)
- Rebounds: 4,160 (5.3 rpg)
- Assists: 1,393 (1.8 apg)
- Stats at NBA.com
- Stats at Basketball Reference

Steven Charles Mix (born December 30, 1947), nicknamed "the Mayor", is an American former professional basketball player and coach. Mix had a thirteen-year playing career, was an NBA All-Star and played in the NBA Finals on four occasions. He later had a lengthy career as a broadcaster for the Philadelphia 76ers.

== College career ==
Mix attended Rogers High School in Toledo, Ohio, and the University of Toledo, playing for coach Bob Nichols.

At Toledo, Mix earned first-team all-Mid-American Conference honors for three consecutive seasons, in 1967, 1968 and 1969. He was the MAC Player of the Year as a senior in 1969. Mix led the Rockets to the NCAA tournament as a sophomore in 1967, averaging 23.0 points and 13.5 rebounds per game. As a junior Mix averaged 21.8 points and 10.2 rebounds, and as senior averaged 24.1 points and 12.1 rebounds.

In his career at Toledo, Mix averaged a double-double of 23.0 points and 11.9 rebounds, shooting 53% from the floor in 73 career games.

Mix ranks fifth in Toledo history with 1,676 total points and is the all-time leader in points per game with 23.0.

== Professional career ==
Mix was a power forward with a 13-year career from 1969 to 1972 and from 1973 to 1983, playing in the National Basketball Association, with one year in the Continental Basketball Association and one game in the American Basketball Association.

Mix was selected in the fifth round of the 1969 NBA draft with the 61st pick by the Detroit Pistons. Mix was also drafted by the Carolina Cougars of the ABA in the 1969 ABA draft.

=== Detroit Pistons (1969–1971) ===
Mix was a reserve early in his career and he took time to become an established player.

Selected in the fifth round of the 1969 NBA draft by the Detroit Pistons, Mix signed with Detroit. In two plus seasons in Detroit under coaches Butch van Breda Kolff and briefly, Earl Lloyd, Mix played in 61 games and averaged 7.3 points and 4.1 rebounds. On November 22, 1971, Mix was waived by the Pistons.

=== Denver Rockets (1971) ===
Mix played one game with the Denver Rockets of the American Basketball Association after his release from Detroit. He scored two points in four minutes, playing for coach Alex Hannum on December 23, 1971.

=== Grand Rapids Tackers (1972–1973) ===
In the 1972–73 season, Mix played for the Grand Rapids Tackers of the Continental Basketball Association (CBA) after being cut by the Philadelphia 76ers in training camp. Mix revived his career averaging 31.1 points in 19 games. Mix led the Tackers to the CBA championship under coach Don Vroon.

=== Philadelphia 76ers (1973-1982) ===
On August 29, 1973, Mix signed as a free agent with the Philadelphia 76ers. Mix's career turned around with the 76ers in 1973–74 and he would remain with the team for nine seasons. Mix played in all 82 games for the 1973–74 76ers, averaging a double-double 14.9 points and 10.5 rebounds, with 2.6 steals under coach Gene Shue. The 76ers finished the season with a record of 25–57.

In 1974–75, Mix averaged 15.6 points and 10.9 rebounds as Philadelphia finished 34–48. Mix made the NBA All-Star team, but ultimately played in only 46 games due to injury.

The 76ers improved to 46–36 in 1975–76, as Mix averaged 13.9 points, 8.2 rebounds, and 2.7 assists in 81 games, playing alongside Doug Collins, George McGinnis, Billy Cunningham and rookie Lloyd Free. The 76ers lost to the Buffalo Braves in the first round of the Eastern Conference playoffs.

Philadelphia scored a coup when they obtained Julius Erving before the 1976–77 season. The 76ers also added Henry Bibby, Caldwell Jones and Darryl Dawkins to the roster. The 76ers finished the regular season 50–32, with Mix averaging 10.5 points, 5.0 rebounds, and 2.0 assists. In the playoffs, Philadelphia beat the Boston Celtics 4 games to 3 and the Houston Rockets 4–2 to advance to the 1977 NBA Finals. In the finals, Philadelphia fell to Bill Walton and the Portland Trail Blazers 4–2.

In 1977–78, Mix averaged 9.3 points, 3.6 rebounds and 2.1 assists in 22 minutes per game, as Philadelphia finished 55–27. After Philadelphia started the season with a 2–4 record, Billy Cunningham replaced Gene Shue as head coach. The 76ers were defeated by the Washington Bullets in the Eastern Conference Finals.

Mix averaged 9.3 points and 4.0 rebounds as the 76ers added Bobby Jones to the 1978–79 roster. The team finished 47–35, losing to the San Antonio Spurs 4–3 in the Eastern Conference Semifinals.

In 1979–80, Philadelphia finished 59–23, with Mix averaging 11.6 points, 3.6 rebounds and 1.8 assists. The 76ers defeated the Washington Bullets 2–0, the Atlanta Hawks 4–1 and the Boston Celtics, with rookie Larry Bird, 4–1 to reach the 1980 NBA Finals against rookie Magic Johnson, Kareem Abdul-Jabbar and the Los Angeles Lakers. The Lakers won the series 4–2.

Mix averaged 10.8 points, 3.7 rebounds and 1.6 assists for the 76ers in 1980–81 at age 33. Philadelphia finished 62–20, as Andrew Toney joined the roster. Philadelphia defeated the Indiana Pacers 2–0 and the Milwaukee bucks 4–3, before losing 4–3 to the eventual NBA champions Boston Celtics 4–3 in the Eastern Conference Finals.

In 1981–82, Mix saw his playing time decrease at age 34 in what became his final season playing in Philadelphia. He averaged 7.2 points, 3.0 rebounds and 1.2 assists in 75 games under coach Cunningham and assistant Chuck Daly. The 76ers defeated the Atlanta Hawks 2–0, the Milwaukee Bucks 4–2 and the defending champions Boston Celtics 4–3 to reach the 1982 NBA Finals. In the NBA Finals, the 76ers lost again to the Los Angeles Lakers 4–2, behind playoff MVP Magic Johnson.

In nine seasons with the Philadelphia 76ers, Mix played in 668 games, averaging 11.3 points, 5.6 rebounds, 1.9 assists and 1.3 steals.

=== Milwaukee Bucks/Los Angeles Lakers (1982-1983) ===
On September 13, 1982, Mix signed as a veteran free agent with the Milwaukee Bucks. Mix averaged 6.0 points and 2.7 rebounds in 57 games with 20 starts for the Bucks under coach Don Nelson. He averaged 14 minutes per game, before being waived by the Bucks on April 11, 1983.

After being waived by the Bucks, Mix signed as a free agent with the Los Angeles Lakers on April 16, 1983. Mix joined the team for the Lakers' final regular season games, scoring nine points in 17 minutes on April 17, 1983. Mix then played in the 1983 playoffs, as the Lakers defeated the Portland Trail Blazers 4–1, the San Antonio Spurs 4–2 to reach the NBA Finals.

In the 1983 NBA Finals, Mix and the Lakers were swept by Mix's former team, the Philadelphia 76ers, 4–0. Mix played his final NBA games in the 1983 NBA Finals.

Overall, Mix appeared in 788 career games, playing for the Detroit Pistons (1968–1971), the Denver Rockets of the ABA (1971), Philadelphia 76ers (1973–1982), Milwaukee Bucks (1982–1983) and Los Angeles Lakers (1983). He averaged 10.6 points, 5.3 rebounds, 1.8 assists and 1.2 steals.

Mix represented the 76ers in the 1975 NBA All-Star Game. Mix played in four NBA Finals, three times with the 76ers (1977, 1980, 1982) and one with the Los Angeles Lakers (1983).

== Coaching/Announcing career ==
Following his retirement as a player, Mix was head women's coach at his alma mater, the University of Toledo during the 1984–85 season. The Rockets finished 6–20.

Mix spent 22 years as a color commentator on the 76ers' television broadcasts.

In 2011, he worked a basketball analyst for SportsTime Ohio.

In 2012, Mix was named women's head coach at Trine University. Mix left his position at Trine in 2014.

Since moving to Florida after his retirement at Trine, Mix has coached at basketball camps at Indian River State College.

== Personal life ==
Mix married his wife, Maryalice, in 1970. They have four children together and reside in Vero Beach, Florida.

During and since their playing days, when they were teammates and roommates, Mix and Julius Erving have been close friends, calling each other for their birthdays to the present day. Mix was nicknamed "Sky" by Erving; according to Mix, "Julius and [Mix] would talk hoops, [they] would talk life [and] family. Every night [Erving] would have a candy bar before he would go to bed. He used to say, 'I'm calling you [Mix] Sky because you can't.'"

On his number 50 jersey being retired by the University of Toledo in 2007, Mix said "I was totally shocked and amazed when this was proposed to me. I know it's never been done before. It's a great honor."

After his retirement from basketball, Mix and his wife moved to Vero Beach, Florida."

After calling Detroit Tigers clubhouse manager Jim Schmakel, Mix networked and became an usher for the New York Mets at First Data Field in Port St. Lucie, where the Mets hold Spring Training and where two of the Mets' minor-league affiliates, the St. Lucie Mets and the rookie-league Gulf Coast League Mets, play. Mix said: "I heard somebody say sometime, when you retire and you do nothing, how do you know when you are done? I need that place where I can hang my hat. I just need a place where I can do something." Mix received some recognition from fans who know him from his basketball days, including Mets Special Assistant to the General Manager J. P. Ricciardi. Mix said that a few people recognize him each day: "I have a couple people bring cards up ... probably a couple times a day somebody will say something."

== Honors ==
- In 1977, Mix was inducted into the Toledo Rockets Hall of Fame.
- Mix was inducted into the Ohio Basketball Hall of Fame in 2007.
- In 2007, Mix' number 50 was retired by the Toledo Rockets.

== NBA/ABA career statistics ==
Legend
GP	Games played	GS	Games started	MPG	Minutes per game
FG%	Field goal percentage	3P%	3-point field goal percentage	FT%	Free throw percentage
RPG	Rebounds per game	APG	Assists per game	SPG	Steals per game
BPG	Blocks per game	PPG	Points per game	**Bold**	Career high

=== Regular season ===
Year	Team	GP	GS	MPG	FG%	3P%	FT%	RPG	APG	SPG	BPG	PPG
1969–70	Detroit	18	–	15.3	.480	–	.590	3.6	.8	–	–	6.6
1970–71	Detroit	35	–	20.9	.446	–	.764	4.7	1.0	–	–	8.3
1971–72	Detroit	8	–	13.0	.319	–	.583	2.9	.5	–	–	4.6
1971–72	Denver(ABA)	1	–	4.0	**1.000**	–	–	1.0	.0	–	–	2.0
1973–74	Philadelphia	**82**	–	36.2	.475	–	.792	10.5	1.9	**2.6**	**.5**	14.9
1974–75	Philadelphia	46	–	**38.0**	.481	–	.776	**10.9**	2.2	1.7	**.5**	**15.6**
1975–76	Philadelphia	81	–	37.5	.499	–	.818	8.2	**2.7**	2.0	.4	13.9
1976–77	Philadelphia	75	–	26.1	.523	–	.817	5.0	2.0	1.2	.3	10.5
1977–78	Philadelphia	**82**	–	22.2	.520	–	.795	3.6	2.1	1.1	.0	9.2
1978–79	Philadelphia	74	–	17.1	.538	–	.801	4.0	1.6	.8	.2	9.3
1979–80	Philadelphia	81	–	19.0	.516	**.400**	.831	3.6	1.8	.8	.1	11.6
1980–81	Philadelphia	72	–	18.4	.501	.000	.833	3.7	1.6	.8	.3	10.8
1981–82	Philadelphia	75	0	16.5	.506	.250	.791	3.0	1.2	.6	.2	7.2
1982–83	Milwaukee	57	20	13.9	.487	.250	.851	2.4	1.2	.6	.1	6.0
1982–83	L.A. Lakers	1	0	17.0	.400	–	**1.000**	1.0	2.0	.0	.0	9.0
Career		788	20	23.9	.499	.286	.803	5.3	1.8	1.2	.2	10.6
All-Star		1	0	11.0	.400	–	–	2.0	.0	–	–	4.0

=== Playoffs ===
Year	Team	GP	GS	MPG	FG%	3P%	FT%	RPG	APG	SPG	BPG	PPG
1976	Philadelphia	3	–	**44.7**	.391	–	.800	**6.0**	**4.0**	**3.7**	**.7**	**14.7**
1977	Philadelphia	**19**	–	21.7	.523	–	.822	3.4	2.3	1.1	.2	7.8
1978	Philadelphia	10	–	23.5	**.598**	–	.884	4.6	3.6	1.5	.1	13.6
1979	Philadelphia	9	–	19.9	.525	–	.867	3.9	1.8	.7	.0	8.3
1980	Philadelphia	17	–	11.8	.458	–	.893	1.8	.8	.5	.3	6.6
1981	Philadelphia	16	–	12.9	.416	.000	.923	2.6	.6	.3	.1	5.5
1982	Philadelphia	7	–	7.1	.545	**1.000**	.714	1.6	.9	.0	.0	4.3
1983	L.A. Lakers	8	–	3.3	.400	–	**1.000**	.1	.0	.0	.0	.9
Career		89	–	16.2	.494	.500	.864	2.8	1.5	.7	.1	7.2
