= Perry Warbington =

American basketball player (1952–2008)

Personal information
- Born: September 7, 1952 Atlanta, Georgia, U.S.
- Died: November 9, 2008 (aged 56) Winder, Georgia, U.S.
- Listed height: 6 ft 2 in (1.88 m)
- Listed weight: 165 lb (75 kg)

Career information
- High school: Luther Judson Price (Atlanta, Georgia)
- College: Florida Gateway (1970–1972); Georgia Southern (1972–1974)
- NBA draft: 1974: 9th round, 145th overall pick
- Drafted by: Philadelphia 76ers
- Position: Point guard
- Number: 22

Career history
- 1974: Philadelphia 76ers
- Stats at NBA.com
- Stats at Basketball Reference

Perry Lee Warbington (September 7, 1952 – November 9, 2008) was an American professional basketball player. He played for the Philadelphia 76ers in the beginning part of the 1974–75 NBA season after being selected 145th overall by them in the 1974 NBA draft.

== University ==
After spending two years at Florida Gateway College, he played for two seasons with the Eagles of Georgia Southern University, where he averaged 20.8 points per game.

== Professional ==
Warbington was chosen 145th in the 1974 NBA draft by the Philadelphia 76ers, with whom he played 5 games, in which he averaged 2.0 points and 3.2 assists. The following year, Warbington joined the Detroit Pistons, but was cut before the start of the season.

== Career statistics ==
Legend
| GP | Games played | GS | Games started | MPG | Minutes per game |
| FG% | Field goal percentage | 3P% | 3-point field goal percentage | FT% | Free throw percentage |
| RPG | Rebounds per game | APG | Assists per game | SPG | Steals per game |
| BPG | Blocks per game | PPG | Points per game | **Bold** | Career high |

=== NBA ===
==== Regular season ====
| Year | Team | GP | GS | MPG | FG% | FT% | RPG | APG | SPG | BPG | PPG |
|---|---|---|---|---|---|---|---|---|---|---|---|
| 1974–75 | Philadelphia | 5 | 0 | 14.0 | .190 | 1.000 | 1.6 | 3.2 | .0 | .0 | 2.0 |
