= LeRoy Ellis =

American basketball player (1940–2012)

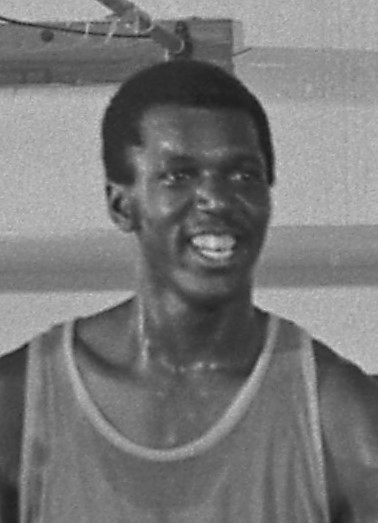
- Ellis in 1972

Personal information
- Born: March 10, 1940 Far Rockaway, New York, U.S.
- Died: June 2, 2012 (aged 72) Scappoose, Oregon, U.S.
- Listed height: 6 ft 11 in (2.11 m)
- Listed weight: 210 lb (95 kg)

Career information
- High school: Thomas Jefferson (Brooklyn, New York)
- College: St. John's (1959–1962)
- NBA draft: 1962: 1st round, 6th overall pick
- Drafted by: Los Angeles Lakers
- Playing career: 1962–1976
- Position: Center / power forward
- Number: 25, 44, 23, 14,

Career history
- 1962–1966: Los Angeles Lakers
- 1966–1970: Baltimore Bullets
- 1970–1971: Portland Trail Blazers
- 1971–1972: Los Angeles Lakers
- 1972–1976: Philadelphia 76ers

Career highlights
- NBA champion (1972); Haggerty Award (1962)

Career statistics
- Points: 10,176 (9.7 ppg)
- Rebounds: 8,709 (8.3 rpg)
- Assists: 1,405 (1.3 apg)
- Stats at NBA.com
- Stats at Basketball Reference

LeRoy Ellis (March 10, 1940 – June 2, 2012) was an American basketball player.

== Basketball career ==
A 6'11" center from St. John's University, Ellis set the St. John's records for highest rebounding average in a season (16.5) and most rebounds in one game with 30. In his senior year, he received the 1962 Haggerty Award as the All-Metropolitan New York Division I men's college basketball player of the year.

Ellis was selected by the Los Angeles Lakers in the first round (8th pick overall) of the 1962 NBA draft. He played in 1,048 games over 14 seasons (1962–1976) in the NBA with the Lakers, Baltimore Bullets, Portland Trail Blazers, and Philadelphia 76ers, and was a member of the 1971–72 Los Angeles Lakers championship team, which also won a then-record 69 games in the regular season, and recorded the longest winning streak in NBA history with 33 wins. The following season, Ellis was traded to the 76ers, who had an NBA-worst 73 losses in an 82-game season. At the close of his NBA career 1976, Ellis had amassed career totals of 10,176 points and 8,709 rebounds.

Ellis was on the first Portland Trail Blazers team in 1970–71, selected from Baltimore in the 1970 expansion draft. He was in the starting lineup for the Trail Blazers' inaugural game. He was their third leading scorer (15.9 points per game) and the leading rebounder, averaging 12.3 per game, the third-best average in the Blazers’ first three decades. He continued playing basketball long after his professional career ended, including being a part of several Senior Masters Games national championship teams in Portland.

== Personal life ==
Ellis and his family settled in Portland, Oregon, while he played professional basketball. He later entered the tire industry during his retirement and moved to Southern California to operate a tire store in Orange County. LeRoy Ellis was accompanied by his son, LeRon, and the two moved to the city of Anaheim, California while waiting for the rest of their family to join them at a later time. Ellis and his wife eventually returned to Portland.

Three of Ellis' children have gone on to play college basketball: his daughter Lisa played women's basketball for California State University, Long Beach and the University of Kentucky; his eldest son LeRoy Jr. played NCAA Division I men's basketball for the University of the Pacific and was a member of the 1990 NCAA Division II National Champion Kentucky Wesleyan College; and another son, LeRon, played at the University of Kentucky and Syracuse University before playing two and a half seasons in the NBA. LeRoy Ellis' youngest son, Lee Christopher Ellis, was shot to death on a Los Angeles street in 1998 at age 19.

Ellis died of prostate cancer on June 2, 2012, at the age of 72.

== Career statistics ==
Legend
| GP | Games played | GS | Games started | MPG | Minutes per game |
| FG% | Field goal percentage | 3P% | 3-point field goal percentage | FT% | Free throw percentage |
| RPG | Rebounds per game | APG | Assists per game | SPG | Steals per game |
| BPG | Blocks per game | PPG | Points per game | **Bold** | Career high |
| † | Won an NBA championship | * | Led the league |

=== NBA ===
==== Regular season ====
| Year | Team | GP | GS | MPG | FG% | FT% | RPG | APG | SPG | BPG | PPG |
|---|---|---|---|---|---|---|---|---|---|---|---|
| 1962–63 | L.A. Lakers | 80* | | 20.4 | .419 | .658 | 6.5 | .6 | | | 7.2 |
| 1963–64 | L.A. Lakers | 78 | | 18.7 | .423 | .659 | 6.4 | .5 | | | 6.6 |
| 1964–65 | L.A. Lakers | 80* | | 25.3 | .444 | .697 | 8.2 | .6 | | | 10.3 |
| 1965–66 | L.A. Lakers | 80* | | 27.7 | .424 | .727 | 9.2 | .9 | | | 12.2 |
| 1966–67 | Baltimore | 81* | | **36.3** | .425 | .738 | 12.0 | 2.1 | | | 14.9 |
| 1967–68 | Baltimore | 78 | | 34.9 | **.475** | .724 | 11.1 | 2.0 | | | 12.4 |
| 1968–69 | Baltimore | 80 | | 20.0 | .435 | .755 | 6.4 | .9 | | | 7.2 |
| 1969–70 | Baltimore | 72 | | 16.2 | .469 | .741 | 5.2 | .7 | | | 6.6 |
| 1970–71 | Portland | 74 | | 34.9 | .443 | **.801** | **12.3** | **3.2** | | | **15.9** |
| 1971–72† | L.A. Lakers | 74 | | 14.6 | .460 | .695 | 4.2 | .6 | | | 4.6 |
| 1972–73 | L.A. Lakers | 10 | | 15.6 | .275 | .800 | 3.3 | .3 | | | 2.6 |
| 1972–73 | Philadelphia | 69 | 69 | 35.4 | .441 | **.801** | 10.8 | 2.0 | | | 13.7 |
| 1973–74 | Philadelphia | 81 | **81** | 35.0 | .452 | .750 | 11.0 | 2.3 | **1.1** | **1.1** | 9.9 |
| 1974–75 | Philadelphia | **82** | 69 | 22.6 | .461 | .727 | 7.1 | 1.4 | .5 | .7 | 7.9 |
| 1975–76 | Philadelphia | 29 | 13 | 16.9 | .462 | .607 | 4.2 | .7 | .6 | .3 | 4.8 |
| Career | | 1,048 | 163 | 26.3 | .442 | .728 | 8.3 | 1.3 | .8 | .8 | 9.7 |

==== Playoffs ====
| Year | Team | GP | MPG | FG% | FT% | RPG | APG | SPG | BPG | PPG |
|---|---|---|---|---|---|---|---|---|---|---|
| 1963 | L.A. Lakers | 13* | 23.2 | **.509** | .818 | 6.5 | **1.0** | | | 6.2 |
| 1964 | L.A. Lakers | 5 | 28.8 | .296 | .733 | 10.0 | .8 | | | 5.4 |
| 1965 | L.A. Lakers | 11 | **36.8** | .393 | .677 | **12.1** | .6 | | | **14.4** |
| 1966 | L.A. Lakers | **14** | 30.4 | .406 | .641 | 9.5 | .6 | | | 9.8 |
| 1969 | Baltimore | 4 | 16.8 | .500 | .600 | 4.5 | .4 | | | 4.8 |
| 1970 | Baltimore | 3 | 2.7 | .000 | **1.000** | 1.0 | .0 | | | .7 |
| 1972† | L.A. Lakers | 13 | 10.3 | .463 | .250 | 3.2 | .8 | | | 3.0 |
| 1976 | Philadelphia | 1 | 1.0 | – | – | .0 | .0 | .0 | .0 | .0 |
| Career | | 64 | 23.2 | .413 | .693 | 7.2 | .7 | .0 | .0 | 7.2 |
