= 1974–75 Philadelphia 76ers season =

Season of National Basketball Association team the Philadelphia 76ers

- Head coach: Gene Shue
- General manager: Pat Williams
- Arena: The Spectrum

Results
- Record: 34–48 (.415)
- Place: Division: 4th (Atlantic); Conference: 7th (Eastern)
- Playoff finish: Did not qualify
- Stats at Basketball Reference

Local media
- Television: WTAF-TV
- Radio: WCAU

The 1974–75 Philadelphia 76ers season was the 76ers 26th season in the NBA & 12th season in Philadelphia. The team was marginally better than in 1973–1974, posting a record of 34–48. Billy Cunningham returned to the 76ers, after a two-year stint in the ABA.

== Offseason ==
=== Draft picks ===
Round	Pick	Player	Position	Nationality	College
1	2	Marvin Barnes	PF/C	United States	Providence
2	19	Don Smith	PG	United States	Dayton
3	37	Connie Norman	SG	United States	Arizona
3	42	Harvey Catchings	C/PF	United States	Hardin-Simmons
4	55	Butch Taylor	C	United States	Jacksonville
5	73	Gary Crowthers		United States	Hardin-Simmons
6	91	Mark Westra		United States	USC
7	109	Dave Stoczynski		United States	Gannon
8	127	Jimmy Powell	F	United States	Middle Tennessee State
9	145	Perry Warbington	PG	United States	Georgia Southern
10	162	Larry Witherspoon		United States	Towson

== Roster ==
Philadelphia 76ers roster
Players

Pos.	No.	Player	Height	Weight	DOB	From
SF	44	Allan Bristow	6 ft 7 in (2.01 m)	210 lb (95 kg)		Virginia Tech
PG	11	Freddie Boyd	6 ft 2 in (1.88 m)	180 lb (82 kg)		Oregon State
PG	3	Fred Carter	6 ft 3 in (1.91 m)	185 lb (84 kg)		Mount St. Mary's
PF	42	Harvey Catchings	6 ft 10 in (2.08 m)	218 lb (99 kg)		Hardin–Simmons
SG	20	Doug Collins	6 ft 6 in (1.98 m)	180 lb (82 kg)		Illinois State
SF	32	Billy Cunningham	6 ft 6 in (1.98 m)	210 lb (95 kg)		North Carolina
PF	25	Leroy Ellis	6 ft 11 in (2.11 m)	210 lb (95 kg)		St. John's
C	43	Clyde Lee	6 ft 10 in (2.08 m)	205 lb (93 kg)		Vanderbilt
SF	50	Steve Mix	6 ft 7 in (2.01 m)	215 lb (98 kg)		Toledo
PG	22	Connie Norman	6 ft 3 in (1.91 m)	175 lb (79 kg)	1953-09-24	Arizona
PG	10	Don Smith	6 ft 0 in (1.83 m)	160 lb (73 kg)		Dayton
SF	26	John Tschogl	6 ft 6 in (1.98 m)	206 lb (93 kg)		UC Santa Barbara

Coaches
Head coach
- Gene Shue
Assistant(s)
- Jack McMahon

Legend
- (DP) Unsigned draft pick
- (FA) Free agent
- (S) Suspended
- Injured

== Regular season ==
=== Season standings ===
Atlantic Division	W	L	PCT	GB	Home	Road	Div
y-Boston Celtics	60	22	.732	–	28–13	32–9	17–9
x-Buffalo Braves	49	33	.598	11	30–11	19–22	15–11
x-New York Knicks	40	42	.488	20	23–18	17–24	9–17
Philadelphia 76ers	34	48	.415	26	20–21	14–27	11–15

#	Eastern Conference				
#	Team	W	L	PCT	GB
1	z-Boston Celtics	60	22	.732	–
2	y-Washington Bullets	60	22	.732	–
3	x-Buffalo Braves	49	33	.598	11
4	x-Houston Rockets	41	41	.500	19
5	x-New York Knicks	40	42	.488	20
6	Cleveland Cavaliers	40	42	.488	20
7	Philadelphia 76ers	34	48	.415	26
8	Atlanta Hawks	31	51	.378	29
9	New Orleans Jazz	23	59	.280	37

z – clinched division title
y – clinched division title
x – clinched playoff spot

=== Season schedule ===
1974–75 game log
Total: 34–48 (home: 20–21; road: 14–27)
October: 3–3 (home: 1–1; road: 2–2)

Game	Date	Team	Score	High points	High rebounds	High assists	Location Attendance	Record
1	October 18	New Orleans	99–112	Steve Mix (33)	Steve Mix (15)	Freddie Boyd (7)	The Spectrum; 8,939	1–0
2	October 19	@ New York	99–86	Billy Cunningham (21)	Steve Mix (14)	Perry Warbington (5)	Madison Square Garden; 15,682	2–0
3	October 22	@ Atlanta	92–125	Doug Collins (24)	Boyd, Ellis (7)	Collins, Cunningham, Van Arsdale (3)	Omni Coliseum; 3,138	2–1
4	October 24	@ New Orleans	102–89	Fred Boyd (35)	Harvey Catchings (12)	Boyd, Catchings (5)	Municipal Auditorium; 6,459	3–1
5	October 25	@ Houston	86–110	Fred Boyd (19)	Steve Mix (9)	Doug Collins (7)	Hofheinz Pavilion; 2,160	3–2
6	October 30	Phoenix	104–99	Steve Mix (30)	Leroy Ellis (17)	Fred Boyd (6)	The Spectrum; 5,089	3–3

November: 4–10 (home: 3–4; road: 1–6)

Game	Date	Team	Score	High points	High rebounds	High assists	Location Attendance	Record
7	November 1	@ Boston	98–114	Tom Van Arsdale (21)	Steve Mix (9)	Billy Cunningham (4)	Boston Garden; 8,269	3–4
8	November 2	Detroit	100–94	Billy Cunningham (24)	Billy Cunningham (13)	Fred Boyd (7)	The Spectrum; 6,890	3–5
9	November 6	Chicago	90–105	Fred Carter (31)	Billy Cunningham (11)	Fred Carter (8)	The Spectrum; 5,287	4–5
10	November 8	Portland	89–105	Steve Mix (36)	Cunningham, Ellis (11)	Billy Cunningham (8)	The Spectrum; 9,290	5–5
11	November 10	@ Seattle	95–109	Billy Cunningham (24)	Billy Cunningham (12)	Fred Carter (6)	Seattle Center Coliseum; 12,825	5–6
12	November 13	@ Phoenix	100–105	Doug Collins (20)	Ellis, Mix (11)	Billy Cunningham (7)	Arizona Veterans Memorial Coliseum; 5,071	5–7
13	November 15	@ Los Angeles	99–105	Billy Cunningham (27)	Steve Mix (13)	Fred Boyd (5)	The Forum; 10,868	5–8
14	November 16	@ Golden State	106–102	Billy Cunningham (27)	Steve Mix (14)	Billy Cunningham (9)	Oakland-Alameda County Coliseum Arena; 8,345	6–8
15	November 20	New York	105–95	Fred Carter (21)	Steve Mix (16)	Carter, Cunningham (5)	The Spectrum; 8,101	6–9
16	November 21	@ Buffalo	95–99	Steve Mix (26)	Steve Mix (12)	Fred Boyd (7)	Maple Leaf Gardens; 5,467	6–10
17	November 23	Boston	96–98	Billy Cunningham (24)	Billy Cunningham (17)	Boyd, Cunningham (4)	The Spectrum; 7,008	7–10
18	November 26	Buffalo	103–99	Fred Carter (29)	Billy Cunningham (12)	Billy Cunningham (9)	The Spectrum; 8,110	7–11
19	November 28	@ Cleveland	103–110	Cunningham, Mix (24)	Billy Cunningham (9)	Fred Carter (9)	Richfield Coliseum; 6,455	7–12
20	November 29	Seattle	121–119 (OT)	Fred Carter (31)	Steve Mix (14)	Fred Boyd (6)	The Spectrum; 8,660	7–13

December: 7–8 (home: 5–3; road: 2–5)

Game	Date	Team	Score	High points	High rebounds	High assists	Location Attendance	Record
21	December 1	@ Milwaukee	112–117	Steve Mix (23)	Billy Cunningham (11)	Fred Carter (8)	MECCA Arena; 5,032	7–14
22	December 4	Kansas City–Omaha	105–109	Fred Carter (25)	Billy Cunningham (16)	Fred Boyd (7)	The Spectrum; 7,027	8–14
23	December 6	New York	96–88	Fred Carter (26)	Clyde Lee (11)	Billy Cunningham (5)	The Spectrum; 7,104	8–15
24	December 7	Buffalo	112–116	Fred Carter (28)	Steve Mix (15)	Billy Cunningham (10)	The Spectrum; 7,020	9–15
25	December 10	@ Buffalo	91–101	Fred Carter (20)	Clyde Lee (14)	Bristow, Cunningham (4)	Buffalo Memorial Auditorium; 7,888	9–16
26	December 11	Houston	96–103	Doug Collins (25)	Clyde Lee (13)	Carter, Cunningham (7)	The Spectrum; 6,041	10–16
27	December 13	Milwaukee	89–93 (OT)	Fred Carter (22)	Clyde Lee (22)	Billy Cunningham (4)	The Spectrum; 6,446	11–16
28	December 14	@ Detroit	93–100	Fred Carter (23)	Steve Mix (18)	Billy Cunningham (5)	Cobo Arena; 4,812	11–17
29	December 17	@ Boston	113–109	Billy Cunningham (33)	Clyde Lee (15)	Billy Cunningham (6)	Providence Civic Center; 4,134	12–17
30	December 18	Boston	131–99	Doug Collins (26)	Clyde Lee (14)	Doug Collins (4)	The Spectrum; 7,145	12–18
31	December 20	Golden State	94–93	Fred Carter (18)	Fred Carter (12)	Bristow, Carter (4)	The Spectrum; 6,292	12–19
32	December 21	@ Washington	101–117	Fred Carter (26)	Clyde Lee (17)	Fred Carter (6)	Capital Centre; 5,792	12–20
33	December 23	Atlanta	88–100	Steve Mix (26)	Steve Mix (17)	Billy Cunningham (8)	The Spectrum; 7,550	13–20
34	December 25	@ New York	104–97	Allan Bristow (23)	Steve Mix (13)	Fred Carter (6)	Madison Square Garden; 18,766	14–20
35	December 26	@ Chicago	91–92	Billy Cunningham (19)	Steve Mix (13)	Billy Cunningham (6)	Chicago Stadium; 9,224	14–21

January: 6–9 (home: 3–4; road: 3–5)

Game	Date	Team	Score	High points	High rebounds	High assists	Location Attendance	Record
36	January 3	@ Kansas City–Omaha	107–95	Steve Mix (29)	Steve Mix (14)	Fred Carter (5)	Kemper Arena; 6,135	15–21
37	January 4	@ Detroit	82–89	Doug Collins (20)	Clyde Lee (12)	Billy Cunningham (8)	Cobo Arena; 6,168	15–22
38	January 6	Buffalo	95–101	Billy Cunningham (24)	Billy Cunningham (9)	Clyde Lee (6)	The Spectrum; 8,186	16–22
39	January 8	Los Angeles	106–98	Fred Carter (26)	Steve Mix (24)	Fred Carter (7)	The Spectrum; 7,645	16–23
40	January 10	Kansas City–Omaha	94–102	Fred Carter (35)	Steve Mix (19)	Billy Cunningham (6)	The Spectrum; 6,125	17–23
41	January 12	@ Milwaukee	88–99	Doug Collins (21)	Billy Cunningham (9)	Billy Cunningham (8)	MECCA Arena; 10,647	17–24
42	January 17	Washington	103–92	Doug Collins (28)	Billy Cunningham (13)	Doug Collins (5)	The Spectrum; 9,176	17–25
43	January 18	Cleveland	108–106	Billy Cunningham (31)	Steve Mix (20)	Doug Collins (7)	The Spectrum; 6,103	17–26
44	January 19	@ Boston	100–102	Billy Cunningham (28)	Billy Cunningham (11)	Carter, Cunningham (4)	Boston Garden; 15,320	17–27
45	January 21	@ Phoenix	101–95	Fred Carter (30)	Lee, Mix (9)	Doug Collins (8)	Arizona Veterans Memorial Coliseum; 4,267	18–27
46	January 23	@ Golden State	100–108	Fred Carter (27)	Clyde Lee (12)	Doug Collins (5)	Oakland-Alameda County Coliseum Arena; 7,070	18–28
47	January 24	@ Portland	97–119	Fred Carter (25)	Clyde Lee (13)	Fred Carter (5)	Memorial Coliseum; 10,580	18–29
48	January 26	@ Los Angeles	103–97	Fred Carter (29)	Billy Cunningham (14)	Billy Cunningham (8)	The Forum; 10,618	19–29
49	January 29	New York	92–98	Fred Carter (25)	Clyde Lee (12)	Fred Carter (5)	The Spectrum; 9,082	20–29
50	January 31	Milwaukee	101–97	Billy Cunningham (38)	Cunningham, Tschogl (13)	Carter, Cunningham (5)	The Spectrum; 10,110	20–30

February: 7–7 (home: 4–3; road: 3–4)

Game	Date	Team	Score	High points	High rebounds	High assists	Location Attendance	Record
51	February 2	Houston	77–90	Doug Collins (26)	Leroy Ellis (14)	Billy Cunningham (5)	The Spectrum; 6,087	21–30
52	February 3	@ Kansas City–Omaha	87–100	Doug Collins (24)	Clyde Lee (9)	Billy Cunningham (3)	Omaha Civic Auditorium; 7,128	21–31
53	February 4	@ Buffalo	111–105 (OT)	Fred Carter (37)	Billy Cunningham (15)	Billy Cunningham (7)	Buffalo Memorial Auditorium; 8,611	22–31
54	February 5	Los Angeles	113–110 (2OT)	Fred Carter (33)	Billy Cunningham (17)	Carter, Cunningham (8)	The Spectrum; 5,209	22–32
55	February 7	@ Boston	98–95	Billy Cunningham (33)	Clyde Lee (9)	Billy Cunningham (5)	Boston Garden; 15,320	23–32
56	February 9	Chicago	97–109	Carter, Ellis (27)	Leroy Ellis (13)	Doug Collins (6)	The Spectrum; 6,370	24–32
57	February 12	Cleveland	105–102	Billy Cunningham (24)	Billy Cunningham (16)	Carter, Cunningham (8)	The Spectrum; 3,773	24–33
58	February 14	Detroit	101–103	Doug Collins (25)	Cunningham, Lee (11)	Billy Cunningham (12)	The Spectrum; 5,595	25–33
59	February 15	Golden State	108–101	Billy Cunningham (27)	Clyde Lee (14)	Billy Cunningham (9)	The Spectrum; 5,695	25–34
60	February 18	@ New Orleans	85–103	Doug Collins (33)	Clyde Lee (18)	Billy Cunningham (8)	Municipal Auditorium; 5,048	25–35
61	February 21	@ Houston	85–103	Doug Collins (22)	Clyde Lee (10)	Billy Cunningham (4)	Hofheinz Pavilion; 3,872	25–36
62	February 23	@ Seattle	114–100	Fred Carter (26)	Clyde Lee (15)	Carter, Cunningham (7)	Seattle Center Coliseum; 12,871	26–36
63	February 25	@ Portland	77–99	Fred Carter (18)	Billy Cunningham (10)	Fred Carter (5)	Memorial Coliseum; 8,822	26–37
64	February 28	Seattle	111–112	Billy Cunningham (29)	Billy Cunningham (10)	Billy Cunningham (11)	The Spectrum; 7,682	27–37

March: 7–8 (home: 4–5; road: 3–3)

Game	Date	Team	Score	High points	High rebounds	High assists	Location Attendance	Record
65	March 1	@ New York	100–94	Fred Carter (26)	Ellis, Lee (10)	Fred Carter (7)	Madison Square Garden; 19,465	28–37
66	March 2	New York	87–91	Fred Carter (24)	Clyde Lee (19)	Carter, Cunningham (5)	The Spectrum; 9,823	29–37
67	March 5	Boston	116–107	Fred Carter (27)	Ellis, Lee (11)	Billy Cunningham (13)	The Spectrum; 9,087	29–38
68	March 8	Washington	113–92	Fred Carter (25)	Leroy Ellis (10)	Billy Cunningham (5)	The Spectrum; 7,848	29–39
69	March 9	@ Washington	113–100	Doug Collins (39)	Leroy Ellis (14)	Fred Carter (6)	Capital Centre; 8,473	30–39
70	March 12	Portland	88–91	Billy Cunningham (27)	Billy Cunningham (16)	Billy Cunningham (7)	The Spectrum; 5,574	31–39
71	March 14	Phoenix	97–108	Doug Collins (32)	Leroy Ellis (11)	Billy Cunningham (11)	The Spectrum; 7,127	32–39
72	March 15	@ Cleveland	96–88	Fred Carter (36)	Clyde Lee (13)	Boyd, Cunningham (5)	Richfield Coliseum; 13,897	33–39
73	March 18	@ Chicago	96–111	Collins, Cunningham (22)	Harvey Catchings (10)	Fred Carter (5)	Chicago Stadium; 8,741	33–40
74	March 19	New Orleans	126–115	Fred Carter (28)	Ellis, Lee (10)	Billy Cunningham (9)	The Spectrum; 6,411	33–41
75	March 21	Atlanta	103–114	Fred Carter (30)	Clyde Lee (12)	Doug Collins (8)	The Spectrum; 7,536	34–41
76	March 22	@ Atlanta	100–104	Billy Cunningham (33)	Leroy Ellis (12)	Billy Cunningham (10)	Omni Coliseum; 2,979	34–42
77	March 25	@ Buffalo	103–118	Billy Cunningham (27)	Leroy Ellis (12)	Billy Cunningham (8)	Buffalo Memorial Auditorium; 12,404	34–43
78	March 26	New York	128–98	Billy Cunningham (20)	Leroy Ellis (11)	Billy Cunningham (6)	The Spectrum; 6,730	34–44
79	March 28	Buffalo	115–104	Clyde Lee (19)	Clyde Lee (8)	Doug Collins (7)	The Spectrum; 5,511	34–45

April: 0–3 (home: 0–1; road: 0–2)

Game	Date	Team	Score	High points	High rebounds	High assists	Location Attendance	Record
80	April 1	@ New York	95–99	Fred Carter (23)	Leroy Ellis (18)	Billy Cunningham (9)	Madison Square Garden; 17,888	34–46
81	April 4	@ Buffalo	97–108	Doug Collins (18)	Clyde Lee (11)	Billy Cunningham (7)	Buffalo Memorial Auditorium; 10,628	34–47
82	April 5	Boston	111–97	Billy Cunningham (20)	Leroy Ellis (10)	Billy Cunningham (6)	The Spectrum; 12,237	34–48

Source: www.basketball-reference.com
