= Fred Carter =

American basketball player and coach

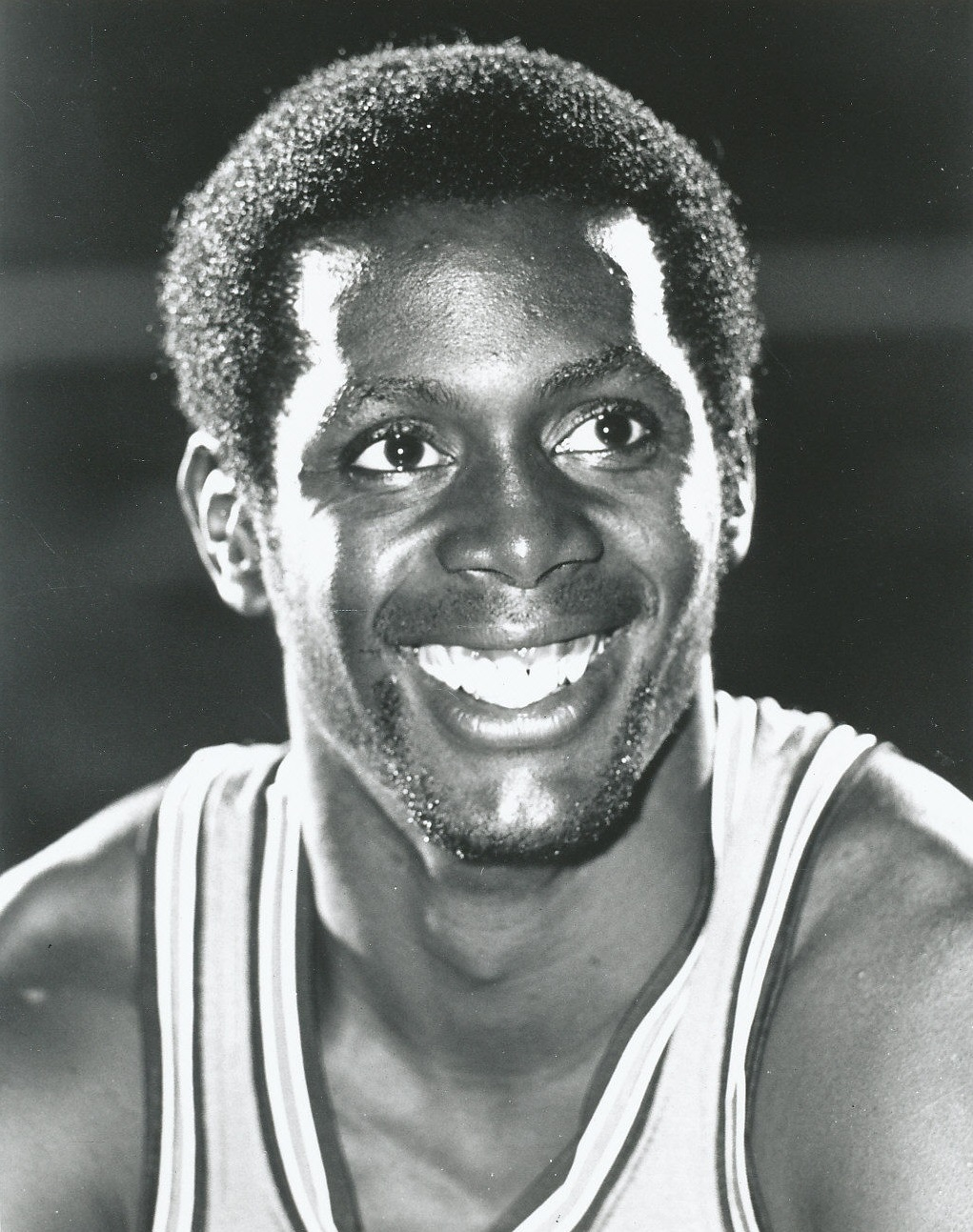
- Carter in 1969

Personal information
- Born: February 14, 1945 (age 81) Philadelphia, Pennsylvania, U.S.
- Listed height: 6 ft 3 in (1.91 m)
- Listed weight: 185 lb (84 kg)

Career information
- High school: Franklin (Philadelphia, Pennsylvania)
- College: Mount St. Mary's (1965–1969)
- NBA draft: 1969: 3rd round, 43rd overall pick
- Drafted by: Baltimore Bullets
- Playing career: 1969–1977
- Position: Shooting guard / point guard
- Number: 3, 5
- Coaching career: 1978–1994

Career history

Playing
- 1969–1971: Baltimore Bullets
- 1971–1976: Philadelphia 76ers
- 1976–1977: Milwaukee Bucks

Career statistics
- Points: 9,271 (15.2 ppg)
- Rebounds: 2,381 (3.9 rpg)
- Assists: 2,122 (3.5 apg)
- Stats at NBA.com
- Stats at Basketball Reference

Fredrick James Carter (born February 14, 1945), nicknamed "Mad Dog" or "Doggy", is an American former professional basketball player and coach, who played in the National Basketball Association (NBA) for eight seasons (1969–77) for the Baltimore Bullets, Philadelphia 76ers, and Milwaukee Bucks. After Carter's playing career ended, he coached the Mount St. Mary's women's basketball team for three seasons to a 60–32 record and three years of AIAW tournament play. He later became an assistant coach in the NBA for the Atlanta Hawks, Chicago Bulls, Washington Bullets and Philadelphia 76ers, and head coach of the 76ers. He was the first black assistant and head coach in 76ers' history.

Carter played four years of varsity basketball at Mount St. Mary's College in Emmitsburg, Maryland, where he was a three-time first-team All-Mason-Dixon Conference selection, and a member of the 1967 Mason-Dixon Conference championship team. After finishing his NBA career as a player and coach, Carter became a basketball analyst for ESPN and NBA TV, where he was sometimes referred to as "the best player on the worst team in NBA history".

== Early life ==
Carter was born on February 14, 1945, in Philadelphia, Pennsylvania, one of four children. His father was a junk dealer and his mother a domestic worker. He attended Benjamin Franklin High School, where he played on the basketball team. He was All-Public League in Philadelphia in 1963, playing center, averaging 17 points per game. He had decided to drop out and join the Army, but there was no one there to swear him in when he went to the recruitment center. Instead, he went with a girlfriend to visit Cheyney University for her freshman orientation. After visiting the campus, he realized he could compete in college and decided to finish high school. It has also been reported that he left high school before graduating and began working, but obtained the credits necessary to obtain a high school degree, and that he finished his high school degree at Temple Prep.

== College ==
Carter was recruited by fellow Philadelphian, and College Basketball Hall of Fame coach, Jim Phelan of Mount St. Mary's College (the "Mount") (now Mount St. Mary's University) in Emmitsburg, Maryland. In one report, Phelan was scouting a Philadelphia high school all-star game in which Carter participated and was named most valuable player. Phelan decided to recruit Carter for the Mount. It is also reported that Phelan was scouting John Baum at the Philadelphia playgrounds when he first saw Carter and began recruiting Carter at that time. Carter later applied and was accepted to Mount St. Mary's in 1965, but had a concern. The school had only integrated in the early 1960s. While driving with Phelan to the rural campus to begin school, Carter asked Phelan how many black students attended the Mount. Phelan told Carter to look in the car's rearview mirror, telling Carter he was going to be the Mount's only black student at that time.

In fact, the school did not pose a serious problem for Carter. Fans at basketball games would chant "In Fred We Trust", and Phelan and his wife Dottie became Carter's surrogate parents on campus. But Carter faced obstacles when going to play teams in the Southern United States. Among other things, during a tournament at Randoph-Macon College in Ashland, Virginia, he was punched twice while retrieving his warmup clothes at halftime. At Hampden-Sydney College, also in Virginia, he was called "every name in the book". On another trip, a restaurant refused Carter service, and the whole team walked out with him.

In the 1965–66 season, as a freshman, Carter had a 23.7 points per game average on a 21–6 Mount St. Mary's team; the highest scoring average for any college player in Maryland. The Mount was runner up in the Mason-Dixon Conference tournament that season. His 637 points that season set a school freshman scoring record.

Mount St. Mary's won the Mason-Dixon Conference title in 1967, and competed in the NCAA College Division men's basketball tournament. Carter averaged 20.3 points per game for the Mount in 1966–67, heading into the tournament. Mount St. Mary's lost to the University of Akron in their opening tournament game, with Carter scoring 16 points; and then lost the consolation game to Baldwin-Wallace, with Carter scoring 18 points.

Despite injuries, Carter averaged 21.4 points per game as a junior (1967–68). He was elected a team co-captain his senior year (1968–69). Carter was first-team All-Mason-Dixon Conference three consecutive seasons (1965 to 1968). The team's record during Carter's tenure was 81–27. During his college career, Carter scored 1,840 points, averaging 21.9 points and 11 rebounds a game. He was injured during part of his senior year after being poked in the eye, and also reportedly suffering an ankle injury.

== Professional career ==
=== Baltimore Bullets ===
A 6 ft 3 in (1.91 m) guard, Carter was selected by the Baltimore Bullets in the third round of the 1969 NBA draft, 43rd overall. Carter was also drafted by the Dallas Chaparrals in the 1969 American Basketball Association draft, but chose to play for the Bullets. Bullet teammate, and fellow Philadelphian, Ray Scott gave Carter the nickname "Mad Dog" after Carter once bit Scott during a one-on-one practice drill. He was also called "Doggy" by his teammates. Carter played on Bullets teams that included future Naismith Memorial Basketball Hall of Fame players Gus Johnson, Earl Monroe, and Wes Unseld, as well as players like Jack Marin, Kevin Loughery, and Scott. They taught Carter what was needed to be a successful NBA player. While he was a reserve guard during his two regular seasons in Baltimore, his level of play rose during the NBA playoffs each season.

As a rookie (1969–70), Carter averaged 16 minutes per game during the season; lowest among the team's rotational guards. During the regular season, he averaged 5.2 points, 1.6 assists, and 2.5 rebounds per game. Carter's role changed during the 1970 Eastern Division playoff series against the New York Knicks, who would go on to win the NBA championship that season. The Bullets took the Knicks to seven games before losing the series, and Carter became a starting guard alongside Earl Monroe. Carter averaged 36.1 minutes, 14.1 points, 3.4 assists and 4.4 rebounds per game against the Knicks. Bullets' coach Gene Shue started Carter in the series because of injuries to guards Kevin Loughery and Eddie Miles. (Miles played sparingly in the series, but Loughery averaged nearly 22 minutes per game despite having suffered four broken ribs and a punctured lung in late February.)

Carter played 49 minutes and scored 21 points in a Game 1 double-overtime loss to the Knicks at Madison Square Garden. Carter had the defensive assignment of guarding future Hall of Fame Knicks' guard Walt Frazier, taking pressure off of Monroe in not having to defend Frazier. Frazier said after the game it was "'one of the guttiest games I've been in'". The Associated Press said "the vibrant play of ice-cool rookie Fred Carter" and Monroe's shooting were the key factors keeping the Bullets in the game, and that Carter was "a defensive marvel". After losing the first two games, Carter scored 23 points, with six rebounds and three assists in the Bullets' Game 3 win, and "hounded Frazier" on defense.

Knicks' Hall of Fame head coach Red Holzman wrote in his basketball memoir, My Unforgettable Season 1970, that "Carter was the surprise and did a lot of damage with his playing time" in that series. He called Carter the Bullets' "not-so-secret weapon". Holzman described Carter's block of a Dick Barnett layup attempt after chasing Barnett down the court late in Game 1: "I don't know how many yards [Carter] spotted Barnett but he nailed him just in time. An amazing play". Coach Shue said of Carter's performance in the series, "'Fred is playing like the most valuable player in the league for us. He's giving us everything. Tremendous defense on Frazier. He's playing him everywhere'".

The next season (1970–71), Carter's playing time increased to 22.2 minutes per game. He averaged 10.4 points, 2.1 assists, and 3.3 rebounds per game. The Bullets defeated the Philadelphia 76ers in seven games in the Eastern Conference semifinals. Carter averaged 25 minutes, 12.1 points, 3.9 rebounds, and 1.4 assists per game in that series. He played 31 minutes and scored 18 points in the decisive Game 7 win, 128–120. Carter made shots when Monroe was double-teamed by the 76ers and passed to Carter, and played tough defense on Hal Greer who scored only 12 points and fouled out of the game.

The Bullets then played the Knicks in the Eastern Conference finals, winning in seven games. Carter once again started alongside Monroe. He averaged 40.3 minutes, 16.7 points, 6.4 rebounds, and two assists per game against the Knicks. The Knicks won the series' first two games, as in 1970, and the Bullets won Game 3, 114–88; Carter having 20 points and seven rebounds. He had 23 points, six rebounds and four assists in the Bullets' Game 4 win. He had 18 points and seven rebounds in a Game 5 loss, and eight points, six assists and four rebounds in a Game 6 win.

Game 7 was again played in Madison Square Garden, but this season the Bullets won, 93–91. Although it was only a conference series, Carter later said "That was our championship". Carter played 38 minutes, with a double-double (14 points and 10 rebounds) to go along with two assists. Carter also played tight defense on Walt Frazier throughout Game 7, limiting Frazier to 13 points and four assists. With 68 seconds remaining and the Bullets up by two points, Carter hit a 20-foot jump shot that secured victory for the Bullets. The Bullets were so desperate to defeat New York, who had knocked them out of the playoffs the last two years, that during a timeout with one minute left in the game coach Gene Shue looked heavenward and prayed, "'Please, let us win this one'".

Carter's game-clinching shot in Game 7 made him a hero in Baltimore. He kept a tape recording of Bullets' sportscaster Jim Karvellas's calling Carter's shot during the game, and would listen to it over the years. During the game itself, it was difficult for Carter to focus early in the game because he was concerned over his baby daughter who had a 105 degree temperature back in Baltimore; but Monroe helped his roommate Carter settle down, and Carter improved his offense in the second half of the game.

The Bullets lost in four consecutive games to the Milwaukee Bucks in the 1971 NBA Finals, which began two days after their exhausting series against the Knicks. The Bucks, led by future Hall of Famers Kareem Abdul-Jabbar, Oscar Robertson, and Bobby Dandridge reached the NBA finals after defeating the San Francisco Warriors in five games and then the Los Angeles Lakers in five games. The Bullets' future Hall of Fame forward Gus Johnson, the team's leading rebounder and third leading scorer during the season (17.1 rebounds and 18.2 points per game), had only played a total of 43 minutes in two games during the Knicks series; and then only after receiving pain-killing injections in his knees. Johnson played only 57 minutes in two games against the Bucks, missing the series' first game altogether because of his injured knees.

Carter played in all four games, averaging 35.8 minutes, 15.3 points, 3.3 rebounds and three assists per game. He was the Bullets leading scorer in Game 4, with 28 points. Early in the series Carter made a boastful comment to the Bucks' Oscar Robertson after blocking Robertson's shot, and in Game 4 Robertson played with extra intensity and focus against Carter for Carter's transgression, scoring 30 points in the Bucks' 118–106 victory.

Over his Bullets' career, during the regular season Carter averaged 19.3 minutes, 7.8 points, three rebounds, and 1.9 assists per game. In 25 playoff games for the Bullets, he averaged 34 minutes, 14.5 points, 4.5 rebounds, and 2.4 assists per game.

=== Philadelphia 76ers ===
Despite Carter's heroics against the Knicks, the Bullets traded him two games into the 1971–72 season. He was traded to the Philadelphia 76ers along with Loughery for guard Archie Clark, a 1973 second-round selection (19th overall–Louie Nelson) and cash, on October 17, 1971. Carter was upset at the time, but had some comfort from being traded with Loughery who was a good friend, even though the two had competed for the same shooting guard position with the Bullets. Carter started in 50 games for the 76ers that season at shooting guard, averaging 27.9 minutes, 13.8 points, four rebounds, and 2.6 assists per game. The 76ers finished the season with a 30–52 record.

The next season (1972–73) Carter was a full-time starter, leading the 76ers with a 20 point per game scoring average. However, he played for a 76ers team that has the worst 82-game season win–loss record in NBA history, 9–73 (.110). (Note: The 2011–12 Charlotte Bobcats would beat the 76ers' unwanted record, finishing with only seven wins, but that season was reduced to 66 games by a lockout.) Carter is sometimes remembered as the best player on the NBA's worst team ever; though some have called the 7–59 (.106) 2011–12 Charlotte Bobcats the worst team in NBA history. Carter himself considered the 2013–14 76ers team a worse team than the 1972–73 76ers, even if it had a better record, because the earlier team played in a competitively stronger league with only 17 teams (compared to 30 teams in 2013–14).

Carter has described the experience of playing on a nine-win team as a building block in life; teaching him how to get through hard times, and to stay motivated by the principles of respecting oneself and respecting the game. Carter was selected as the team's most valuable player for the 1972–73 season, but declined the award, later stating "'I asked the media, Did I lead us to 73 loses or did I lead us to nine wins? I didn't think there should be an MVP'".

Carter played a little over three more seasons with the 76ers. In the three seasons from 1973 to 1976, he averaged 21.4, 21.9, and 18.9 points per game; 4.8, 4.4 and 3.6 rebounds per game; and 5.7, 4.4. and 4.5 assists per game. He led the 76ers in scoring in two of those seasons. He was 16th in the NBA in scoring in 1973–74, and 10th in the NBA the following season.

Carter's former Bullets' coach Gene Shue took over as the 76ers head coach before the 1973–74 season, leading the 76ers as head coach through the 1976–77 season. Carter became the 76ers starting point guard beginning with the 1974–75 season. By the 1975–76 season he played on a 76ers team that also included future Hall of Fame players shooting guard Doug Collins and forward George McGinnis; and the 76ers had their first winning season (46–36) since 1971. Carter was now the team's third leading scorer, behind McGinnis and Collins.

The 76ers reached the first round of the 1976 NBA playoffs, losing in three games against the Buffalo Braves. As he had with the Bullets, Carter's play improved in the playoffs compared to the regular season. Carter led the 76ers in minutes (41.7), points (28), and assists (five) per game against the Braves. He had 30 points in Game 1, and 32 points in Game 3.

Carter began the 1976–77 season with the 76ers, but his playing time was limited. The Sixers had acquired Henry Bibby in September 1976, and Bibby became the starting point guard, ahead of Carter. In late October, the 76ers acquired future Hall of Fame forward Julius Erving, giving the 76ers a starting that lineup included Erving, McGinnis, and Collins who were the team's three leading scorers that season. In early December 1976, the 76ers traded Carter to the Milwaukee Bucks for the Buck's No. 2 draft choices in 1977 and 1978. At the time of the trade, Carter had played in only 14 games without any starts, averaging 16.9 minutes and 6.9 points per game.

Carter started 358 games for the 76ers, and during the four seasons from 1972 to 1976 started no fewer than 74 games in a season and averaged at least 20 points per game in three consecutive seasons (1972 to 1975). Overall, he averaged 35.4 minutes, 18.8 points, 4.5 rebounds, 4.2 assists, and 1.4 steals per game as a 76er.

=== Milwaukee Bucks ===
Carter finished the 1976–77 season as a reserve guard for the Bucks, playing in 47 games. Carter averaged 18.6 minutes and 8.3 points per game. His missed some games for the Bucks in the second half of December after suffering a sprained ankle. This became Carter's final season. The Bucks informed Carter that he did not fit into the Bucks' plans for the 1977–78 season, and so Carter did not report to training camp. The Bucks waived Carter in September 1977.

Over the course of his NBA playing career Carter scored 9,271 points, averaging 15.2 points a game, with a 42.5 field goal percentage. He averaged 3.9 rebounds, 3.5 assists, and 1.2 steals per game over his career. In 28 career playoff games, he averaged 34.8 minutes, 15.9 points, 4.4 rebounds, 2.7 assists, and 1.3 steals per game.

== Coaching career ==
=== Mount St. Mary's women's team ===
Carter came back to the Mount when he was hired to coach the women's basketball team in April 1978. He wound up putting in more time coaching than when he was a player. Phelan said Carter worked the women's team harder than Phelan worked the men's team. Carter took the team to a 19–12 record in the 1978–79 season, and a place in the Eastern AIAW Division II tournament (coming in fourth); an 18–9 record in the 1979–80 season (coming in third in the Eastern AIAW Division II tournament); and a 23–11 record in 1980–81 (coming in the third in Eastern AIAW Division II tournament). Gene Shue was considering Carter for an assistant coaching job after Carter's playing career ended, but Carter told Shue he had already committed to coaching at Mount St. Mary's.

=== NBA ===
After coaching at Mount St. Mary's, Carter was a scout for the San Diego Clippers and then became an assistant coach with the Atlanta Hawks. He was an assistant coach for the Hawks from 1981 to 1983, under head coach Kevin Loughery. Carter was next an assistant coach with the Chicago Bulls (1984–1985), again under Loughery. This was Michael Jordan's rookie season. After seeing Jordan during the 1984 preseason, Carter compared Jordan to Secretariat in standing above all the other players. Loughery, Carter, and fellow assistant coach Bill Blair were fired at the end of the season, in late May 1985.

Carter was hired as an assistant coach in late June 1985 by Washington Bullets' general manager Bob Ferry. Ferry was the Baltimore Bullets' chief scout in 1969 when the team drafted Carter, and was the Bullets principal advocate for drafting Carter because of his potential to stand out in the NBA as a player. The Bullets' head coach in 1985 was Gene Shue, who was Carter's first head coach as an NBA player in Baltimore. In March 1986, Bullets' owner Abe Pollin fired Shue, and named Loughery as the Bullets' head coach. Carter remained with the Bullets as Loughery's assistant coach through the 1986–87 season.

The 76ers hired Carter as an assistant coach in June 1987, making him the first African American coach in team history. Carter had been offered an assistant coaching position by Gene Shue with the Los Angeles Clippers, but he wanted to come home to Philadelphia. Carter originally joined the 76ers while Matt Goukas was head coach to begin the 1987–88 season, reportedly at the recommendation of team owner Harold Katz. Katz replaced Goukas as head coach with 76ers' assistant coach Jim Lynam during the season.

Other than 43 games in his first season with the 76ers under Goukas, Carter was an assistant coach to Jim Lynam for the 76ers from 1987 to 1992. He served in the role of defensive coach under Lynam. Carter continued as an assistant coach for the 76ers in the 1992–93 season under new head coach Doug Moe, with Lynam now the team's general manager. Moe was fired after going 19–37, with the team appearing uncompetitive in some of their losses. Carter was appointed head coach in March 1993. As the 76ers head coach, Carter refocused the 76ers on practicing basketball fundamentals. Carter finished the season with a record of 7–19.

Carter coached the full 1993–94 76ers season, finishing with a 25–57 record. Lynam left the 76ers to coach in Washington at the end of the 1993–94 season, and team owner Katz replaced both Lynam as general manager and Carter as coach with John Lucas (who went 24–58 and 18–64 in his two seasons with the 76ers).

== Basketball analyst ==
Carter spent one season as cable television analyst for the 76ers in the 1980s. Following his coaching tenure with the Sixers, Carter began a successful career as a basketball analyst. He spent eight years at ESPN and five years at NBA TV, before his retirement. During his time as co-host of NBA Tonight he was known for his claim of being "the best player on the worst team in NBA history".

== Legacy and honors ==
Carter was inducted into the Mount St. Mary's Athletics Hall of Fame in 1979. On December 1, 2007, Carter had his jersey No. 33 retired at halftime of the Mount St. Mary's v. Loyola College of Baltimore men's basketball game. The game was played on the Coach Jim Phelan Court in Knott Arena in Emmitsburg, Maryland. Carter was the first Mountaineer basketball player to have his number retired.

Carter is also known for popularizing the "fist bump".

== NBA career statistics ==
Legend
GP	Games played	GS	Games started	MPG	Minutes per game
FG%	Field goal percentage	3P%	3-point field goal percentage	FT%	Free throw percentage
RPG	Rebounds per game	APG	Assists per game	SPG	Steals per game
BPG	Blocks per game	PPG	Points per game	**Bold**	Career high

=== Regular season ===
Year	Team	GP	GS	MPG	FG%	3P%	FT%	RPG	APG	SPG	BPG	PPG
1969–70	Baltimore	76	–	16.0	.358	–	.690	2.5	1.6	–	–	5.2
1970–71	Baltimore	77	–	22.2	.417	–	.650	3.3	2.1	–	–	10.4
1971–72	Baltimore	2	–	34.0	.222	–	.333	**9.5**	**6.0**	–	–	7.5
1971–72	Philadelphia	77	–	27.9	.444	–	.630	4.0	2.6	–	–	13.8
1972–73	Philadelphia	81	–	37.0	.421	–	.704	6.0	4.3	–	–	20.0
1973–74	Philadelphia	78	–	39.0	.430	–	.709	4.8	5.7	1.4	**0.3**	21.4
1974–75	Philadelphia	77	–	**39.6**	**.447**	–	.738	4.4	4.4	1.1	**0.3**	**21.9**
1975–76	Philadelphia	**82**	–	36.5	.417	–	.702	3.6	4.5	**1.7**	0.2	18.9
1976–77	Philadelphia	14	–	16.9	.426	–	.526	1.7	1.5	0.8	0.1	6.9
1976–77	Milwaukee	47	–	18.6	.416	–	**.753**	2.0	2.2	0.6	0.1	8.3
Career		611	–	30.0	.425	–	.693	3.9	3.5	1.2	0.2	15.2

=== Playoffs ===
Year	Team	GP	GS	MPG	FG%	3P%	FT%	RPG	APG	SPG	BPG	PPG
1969–70	Baltimore	7	–	36.1	.383	–	.607	4.4	3.4	–	–	14.1
1970–71	Baltimore	**18**	–	33.2	.415	–	.644	**4.6**	2.0	–	–	14.6
1975–76	Philadelphia	3	–	**41.7**	**.433**	–	**.867**	3.3	**5.0**	**1.3**	**0.3**	**28.0**
Career		28	–	34.8	.410	–	.687	4.4	2.7	1.3	0.3	15.9

== Head coaching record ==
Team	Year	G	W	L	W–L%	Finish	PG	PW	PL	PW–L%	Result
Philadelphia	1992–93	26	7	19	.269	6th in Atlantic	—	—	—	—	Missed playoffs
Philadelphia	1993–94	82	25	57	.305	6th in Atlantic	—	—	—	—	Missed playoffs
Career		108	32	76	.296		0	0	0	–	
