= Billy Cunningham =

American basketball player and coach (born 1943)

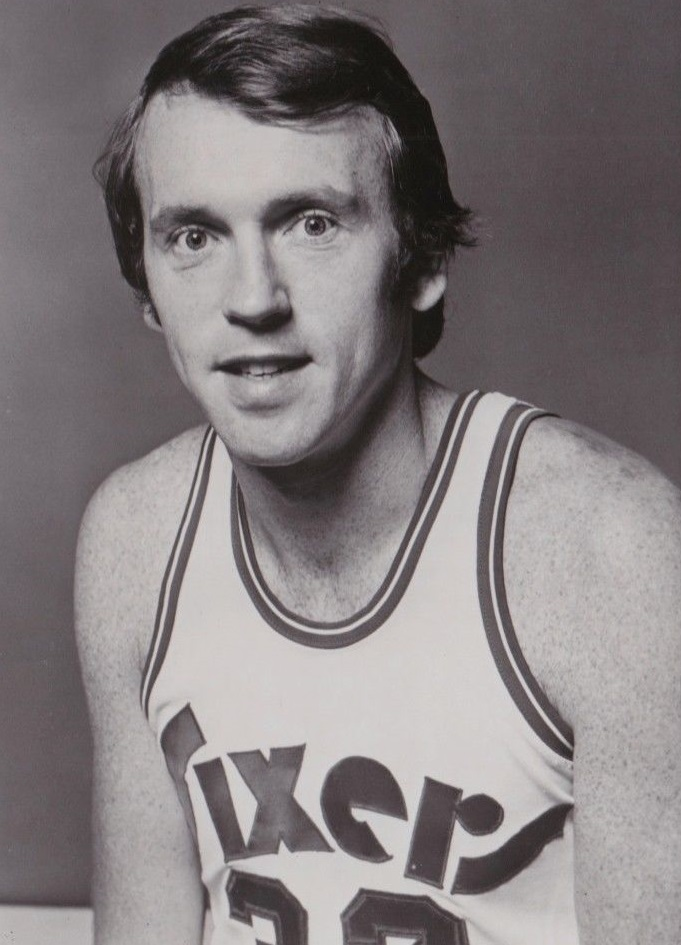
- Cunningham with the Philadelphia 76ers

Personal information
- Born: June 3, 1943 (age 83) Brooklyn, New York, U.S.
- Listed height: 6 ft 6 in (1.98 m)
- Listed weight: 210 lb (95 kg)

Career information
- High school: Erasmus Hall (Brooklyn, New York)
- College: North Carolina (1962–1965)
- NBA draft: 1965: 1st round, 5th overall pick
- Drafted by: Philadelphia 76ers
- Playing career: 1965–1976
- Position: Small forward / power forward
- Number: 32
- Coaching career: 1977–1985

Career history

Playing
- 1965–1972: Philadelphia 76ers
- 1972–1974: Carolina Cougars
- 1974–1976: Philadelphia 76ers

Career highlights
- As player: NBA champion (1967); 4× NBA All-Star (1969–1972); 3× All-NBA First Team (1969–1971); All-NBA Second Team (1972); NBA All-Rookie First Team (1966); ABA MVP (1973); All-ABA First Team (1973); ABA All-Star (1973); NBA anniversary team (50th, 75th); ABA All-Time Team; No. 32 retired by Philadelphia 76ers; First-team All-American – USBWA (1964); Second-team All-American – NABC, UPI (1965); ACC Player of the Year (1965); 3× First-team All-ACC (1963–1965); As coach: NBA champion (1983); 4× NBA All-Star Game head coach (1978, 1980, 1981, 1983)

Career ABA and NBA playing statistics
- Points: 16,310 (21.2 ppg)
- Rebounds: 7,981 (10.4 rpg)
- Assists: 3,305 (4.3 apg)
- Stats at NBA.com
- Stats at Basketball Reference

Career coaching record
- NBA: 454–196 (.698)
- Record at Basketball Reference
- Basketball Hall of Fame
- Collegiate Basketball Hall of Fame

William John Cunningham (born June 3, 1943) is an American former professional basketball player and coach, who was nicknamed the Kangaroo Kid at the University of North Carolina for his leaping and record setting rebounding abilities. Cunningham spent a total of 17 seasons with the NBA's Philadelphia 76ers (nine as player, eight as coach), and two seasons as a player with the Carolina Cougars of the American Basketball Association (ABA). He was an NBA champion both as a player (1967) and as a head coach (1983). He was the sixth man on the 1966–67 76ers team that is considered among the greatest teams in NBA history; and head coach of the 1982–83 76ers team that is likewise considered one of the greatest teams in NBA history.

As a professional, Cunningham was selected to the NBA All-Rookie First Team, an NBA All-Star, All-NBA First and Second Team, an ABA All-Star, All-ABA First Team, and the ABA Most Valuable Player. He was selected first-team All-NBA three consecutive seasons (1968 to 1971) and was voted the ABA's Most Valuable Player in the 1972–73 season; his first year in that league. He averaged a double-double over 11 professional seasons.

Cunningham played college basketball at the University of North Carolina in the Atlantic Coast Conference (ACC). He was first-team All-ACC three consecutive seasons, the ACC Player of the Year in 1965, and received All-American recognition in 1964 and 1965. Cunningham was later named to the ACC 50th Anniversary men's basketball team honoring the fifty best players in Atlantic Coast Conference history. He averaged a double-double in each of his three years at North Carolina.

Cunningham became the 76ers head coach at 34-years old, and coached the 76ers for eight seasons (1977 to 1985). His teams were in the NBA playoffs every season. His 76ers teams reached three NBA finals, winning the 1983 NBA Finals over the Los Angeles Lakers, with a 12–1 record in the playoffs that season. The 1982–83 76ers are considered among the greatest teams in NBA history. Cunningham reached the 200-, 300- and 400-win milestones faster than any coach in NBA history. When he retired in May 1985, his teams had won 454 regular season games and he has the second-best regular-season winning percentage in league history (.698). Cunningham's playoff record as a coach is 66–39 (.629). He is the winningest coach in the 76ers' history. Former 76ers player and coach, Hall of Famer Doug Collins said Cunningham might be the greatest 76er, when looking at his overall impact on the franchise.

One of basketball's all-time greats, Cunningham was elected to the Naismith Memorial Hall of Fame in 1986 and honored by selection to both the NBA's 50th and 75th Anniversary Teams as one of its legendary players, as well as to the ABA All-Time Team. He was further honored in 1990 when he was selected as part of the first class to enter the New York City Basketball Hall of Fame; and in 2006 when he was named to the inaugural class of the National Collegiate Basketball Hall of Fame.

After retiring as a player, Cunningham worked for the CBS broadcasting network as a television color analyst on NBA games. He discontinued working for CBS when he returned to the NBA as a coach in 1977; but once again worked for CBS after retiring from coaching in 1985. Cunningham eventually became CBS' top analyst for NBA games in 1988; but discontinued that work again, after the 1987–88 NBA season. Cunningham was part owner and general manager of the expansion Miami Heat of the NBA, which played their inaugural season in 1988–89. Cunningham returned as a color analyst for CBS briefly during the NBA playoffs in 1990; and was an analyst for the 1991 NCAA Division I men's basketball tournament. He sold his interest in the Heat in early 1995.

== Early life ==
Billy Cunningham was born in the Parkville section of Brooklyn on June 3, 1943, the son of a fireman, John Cunningham. John had served in World War II and ultimately became the Assistant Chief of New York City.

Cunningham's fame began while he was playing at the St. Rose of Lima grammar school playground, and later Erasmus Hall High School in Brooklyn, where he was the Most Valuable Player (MVP) in the Brooklyn League in 1961. He led an undefeated Erasmus to the New York City Championship in 1961. That year, he was first-team All-New York City, and a member of the Parade magazine All-America team.

== College career ==
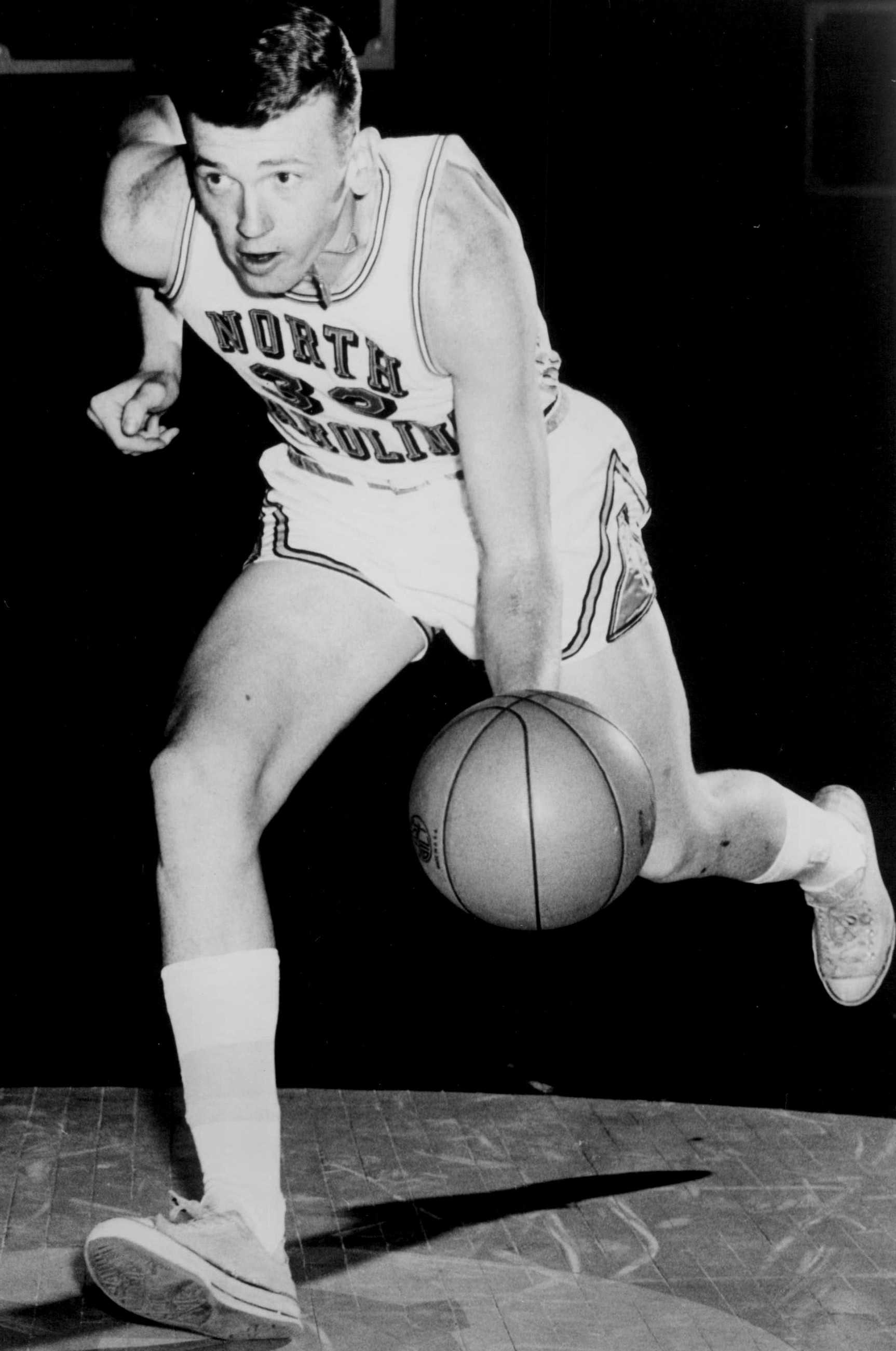
Cunningham while at UNC.

=== Frank McGuire and Dean Smith ===
Cunningham attended the University of North Carolina (UNC), where he played basketball for the Tar Heels' varsity from 1962 to 1965 in the Atlantic Coast Conference (ACC). Frank McGuire was the coach at North Carolina (1952 to 1961). McGuire's sister lived in the Cunningham family's neighborhood, and Cunningham delivered her newspaper. McGuire had been recruiting New York high schoolers, and Cunningham's parents told him after his junior year in high school that he "'could either go play ball for Uncle Frank or go to a Catholic university'". Cunningham said he "'wanted to at least visit some of the other schools. I knew I’d go to Carolina, but I wanted the big-shot treatment. But my dad said no, that I might be depriving another kid of a scholarship'".

McGuire, however, would never coach Cunningham at North Carolina. Since 1960, McGuire and North Carolina had been under investigation by the NCAA for alleged recruiting violations at North Carolina. McGuire and the school vigorously defended against this allegation, but the school was ultimately put on probation for one year. McGuire was also in conflict with the chair of the ACC in 1960–61.

Separately, two of North Carolina's basketball players had allegedly been connected to a gambling controversy, and the school was intending to deemphasize basketball because of that going into the 1961–62 school year. By April of 1961, McGuire decided it was time to move on from North Carolina. He began pursuing coaching and executive positions in the NBA, and in August 1961 McGuire took a head coaching job with the Philadelphia Warriors of the NBA; North Carolina having agreed to release McGuire from the remainder of his contract with the school.

When Cunningham started his varsity career at North Carolina for the 1962–63 season, Dean Smith, who had been McGuire's assistant coach, was the Tar Heels' head coach. Smith would go on to coach North Carolina for 36 years and win 879 games and two NCAA championships; but after taking over as head coach he was not allowed to recruit outside of North Carolina. Smith had some success, but not to the extent McGuire had with earlier Tar Heel teams. In early January 1965 the team was not consistently playing a high level. After a difficult loss to Wake Forest, some North Carolina students hanged a dummy of Smith in effigy. It has been stated that when the team arrived back after the loss, Cunningham, who was Smith's first true star player, got off the team bus and tore down the dummy.

=== Playing career ===
Cunningham excelled as a player at North Carolina, where he was known as the "Kangaroo Kid" for his leaping ability. In addition to the height he attained, Cunningham was described as being able to stay suspended in air longer than other players. This ability was combined with Cunningham's unique movement and shot making skill as an offensive player, the ability to score inside and outside on offense, high-level rebounding ability, and being a prolific shot blocker on defense.

As a sophomore (1962–63), Cunningham averaged 22.7 points and 16.1 rebounds per game; leading the Tar Heels in both categories. He led the ACC in rebounding and was second in scoring. As a junior (1963–64), Cunningham averaged 26 points and 15.8 rebounds per game; leading the ACC in both categories. As a senior, Cunningham was team captain. He again led the ACC in scoring and rebounding averages, with 25.4 points per game and 14.3 rebounds per game. Over his three-year Tar Heel career, Cunningham averaged 24.8 points and 15.4 rebounds per game.

During the 1963–64 season, Clemson Tigers coach Bobby Roberts said "'Anybody who thinks they can get away with a normal defense against Cunningham is crazy . . . You try everything you can think of and you never really stop him, but at least you're trying'". Cunningham set a single-game North Carolina record with 48 points against Tulane on December 10, 1964. He also had 25 rebounds in that game. He had 27 rebounds in a game vs. Clemson on February 16, 1963; setting a school record at the time. In his UNC career, Cunningham scored 1,709 points and had 1,062 rebounds.

From 1962 to 1964, Cunningham set a North Carolina record with double-doubles in 40 consecutive games. From 1962 to 1965, he had 60 games with double-doubles; a school record until broken by Armando Bacot in 2023. Cunningham's 60 double-doubles came in 69 games over three years; while Bacot broke the record during his fourth season, having already played 100 games in his first three seasons.

Cunningham's 15.4 rebounds per game career average is the highest in Tar Heel history, and third all-time in ACC history. His 24.8 points per game scoring average is second all-time at North Carolina and ninth all-time in the ACC. Upon graduation, Cunningham's 1,062 rebounds were the best in North Carolina history, and is now fourth highest. After Howard Deasy's 17.3 rebounds per game average in 1950–51, Cunningham has the next three highest rebounding averages per season in Tar Heel history.

As a senior, he was the ACC's Player of the Year. Cunningham was selected first-team All-ACC from 1963 to 1965. He was named to the first-team 1963 All-ACC Tournament team and 1964 All-ACC Tournament team. As a junior (1964), Cunningham was named to the 10-player U. S. Basketball Writers Association (USBWA) All-America Team for Look magazine, and was among the last candidates eliminated from inclusion in the 1965 10-player team. In 1965, United Press International (UPI) named Cunningham a second-team All-American, and the Associated Press (AP) named him a third-team All-American.

== Professional career ==
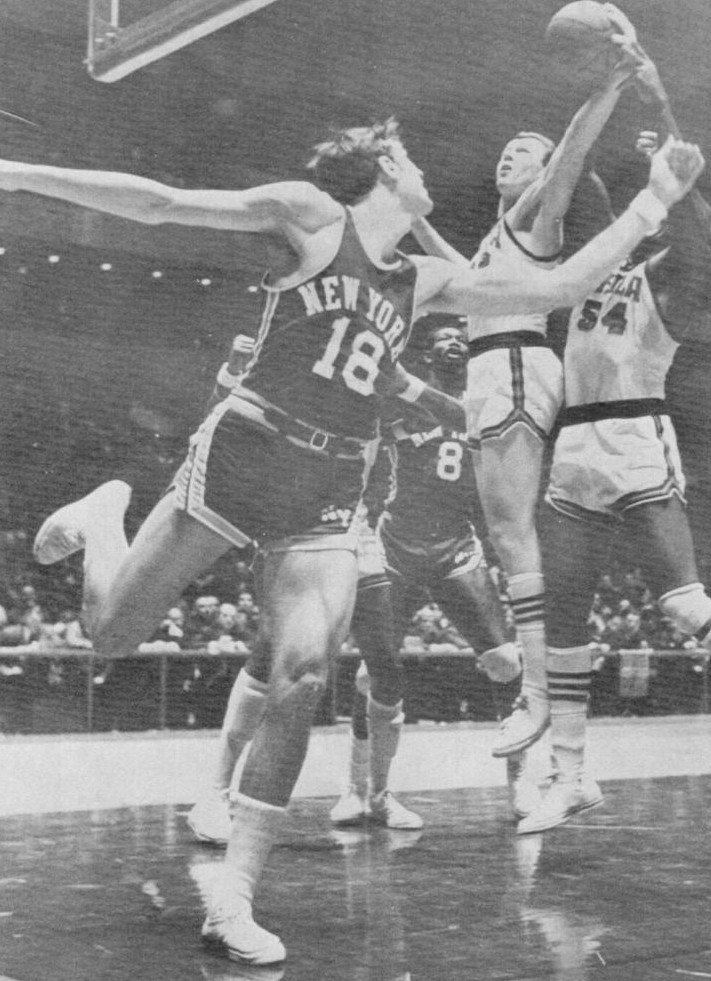
Phil Jackson (#18), Walt Bellamy (#8), Bill Cunningham (with ball), and Lucious Jackson (#54), in a Knicks vs. 76ers game.

=== Philadelphia 76ers ===
The Philadelphia 76ers selected Cunningham with the seventh overall pick in the 1965 NBA draft. He was drafted sight unseen on the recommendation of Frank McGuire. In 1965, Cunningham joined the Philadelphia 76ers and settled into the role of sixth-man in his rookie year. He played 80 games, primarily as a sixth man, while averaging 14.3 points and 7.5 rebounds a game. At the conclusion of the season he was named to the NBA All-Rookie Team, along with fellow future Hall of Famer Rick Barry, Fred Hetzel, Tom Van Arsdale and Dick Van Arsdale.

The following season (1966–67), under future Hall of Fame head coach Alex Hannum, the 76ers had a 68–13 record and won the 1967 NBA championship. Along with Cunningham, the 76ers also featured future Hall of Famers Wilt Chamberlain, Hal Greer, and Chet Walker, as well as Wali Jones and Luke Jackson. Cunningham, Chamberlain, and Greer were later named to the NBA 75th Anniversary Team as among the greatest 76 players in NBA history. The 1966–67 Philadelphia 76ers are considered one of the greatest teams in NBA history.

Again playing as the sixth man, Cunningham averaged 26.8 minutes, 18.5 points, 7.4 rebounds, and 2.5 assists per game during the regular season. The 76ers defeated the Boston Celtics in five games to win the 1967 Eastern Division finals. Cunningham averaged 20.4 minutes, 12.4 points, 6.2 rebounds, and two assists per game in that series. The 76ers won the NBA finals in six games over the San Francisco Warriors. Cunningham averaged 25.7 minutes, 19.7 points, 5.7 rebounds, and three assists per game in the series. In Game 2 of the 1967 NBA Finals, Cunningham scored 28 points during a 126–95 win over the Warriors.

The 76ers were 62–20 during the 1967–68 regular season, the best record in the NBA that season. Cunningham played in 74 games, averaging 28.1 minutes, 18.9 points, 7.6 rebounds, and 2.5 assists per game. The 76ers defeated the New York Knicks in six games in the 1968 Eastern Division semifinals. However, on the first play in overtime during Game 3 of that series, Cunningham suffered an injury that left him with a broken arm in three places, and he was unable to play for the rest of the 1968 playoffs. In the three games he had played against the Knicks, Cunningham played nearly 29 minutes per game; and averaged 20.7 points, 7.3 rebounds, and 3.3 assists per game. Playing without Cunningham, the 76ers lost in seven games to the Celtics in the Eastern Division finals. That series opened on Friday, April 5, 1968, and was overshadowed by Martin Luther King Jr.'s assassination that occurred a day earlier.

In July 1968, after a dispute over his salary and the right to be included in hiring a head coach to replace Alex Hannum, the 76ers traded Wilt Chamberlain to the Los Angeles Lakers for Archie Clarke, Darrall Imhoff, Jerry Chambers and cash. Cunningham became the 76ers' franchise player. He left his role as sixth man and became the 76ers' starting power forward, with Luke Jackson moving to center. Cunningham played in all 82 76ers' game, averaging nearly 41 minutes per game. During the 1968–69 regular season, he led the 76ers in scoring (24.8 points per game) and rebounding (12.8 rebounds per game). He also averaged 3.5 assists per game.

Cunningham was third in the NBA in scoring and 10th in rebounding. He was selected to play in the 1969 All-Star Game, was first-team All-NBA, and third in the NBA's Most Valuable Player voting behind Wes Unseld and Willis Reed. Luke Jackson had replaced Chamberlain at center for the 1968–1969 season; and was averaging a double-double until a devastating injury ended his season in December 1968. He was replaced by Imhoff. Even without Chamberlain, and Jackson for most of the season, the 76ers had a 55–27 record under new head coach Jack Ramsay; tied for second best in the NBA that season. The 76ers lost in the first round of the 1969 NBA playoffs to the eventual NBA champion Boston Celtics, in five games. Cunnigham led the 76ers in minutes played (43.4 per game) and points (24.4 per game), and was second to Imhoff in rebounding (12.6 per game).

During the 1969–70 season, Cunningham led the 76ers in minutes played (39.4 per game), points (26.1 per game), rebounding (13.6 per game), and was third on the team averaging 4.3 assists per game. He was fourth in the NBA in scoring and seventh in rebounding. On November 8, 1969, he played the entire game against the Seattle SuperSonics, with 46 points and 22 rebounds. Cunningham was selected to the All-Star Game again, where he started and scored 19 points. He was again named first-team All-NBA and was tied for fifth in Most Valuable Player Voting.

The 76ers' record fell to 42–40 that season. They lost in five games in the first round of the 1970 NBA playoffs to the Milwaukee Bucks. In that series, Cunningham led the 76ers in minutes played (41 per game), points (29.2 per game), and rebounding (10.4 per game); while also averaging four assists per game. Cunningham had 37 points, 10 rebounds and seven assists in the 76ers' Game 2 win; a career-high 50 points and 10 rebounds in Game 4; and 28 points and 18 rebounds in Game 5.

In the 1970–71 season, Cunningham played in 81 games, and again led the 76ers in scoring (23 points per game) and rebounding (11.7 rebounds per game); while averaging 38.1 minutes and 4.9 assists per game. On December 20, 1970, Cunningham scored 31 points and grabbed a career-high 27 rebounds en route to a 134–132 road win over the Portland Trail Blazers. He was ninth in the NBA in scoring and 15th in rebounding that season. Cunningham was named first-team All-NBA for the third consecutive season, and started in the All-Star Game for a second consecutive season. He was ninth in the NBA Most Valuable Player voting.

The 76ers lost a seven-game series in the first round of the 1971 NBA playoffs to the Baltimore Bullets. Cunningham led the 76ers in minutes played (43 per game), points (25.9 per game), rebounds (15.4 per game), and assists (5.7 per game). He had a triple-double in the 76ers' Game 3 loss (21 points, 19 rebounds, 10 assists); 18 points, 17 rebounds, and eight assists in Game 4; 32 points and 20 rebounds in Game 5; 33 points, 16 rebounds, and five assists in a Game 6 victory to avoid elimination; and 30 points, 19 rebounds, and four assists in Game 7.

Cunningham played 75 games for the 76ers in 1971–72, with the team finishing with a 30–52 record. In a December 17, 1971 game against the Portland Trail Blazers he played 46 minutes and had a regular season career-high 47 points, along with 13 rebounds, nine assists, five steals, and two blocked shots. Cunningham was an All-Star Game starter for the third consecutive season, and was named second-team All-NBA, along with teammate Archie Clark. Cunningham averaged 38.7 minutes, 23.3 points, 12.2 rebounds, and 5.9 assists per game that season.

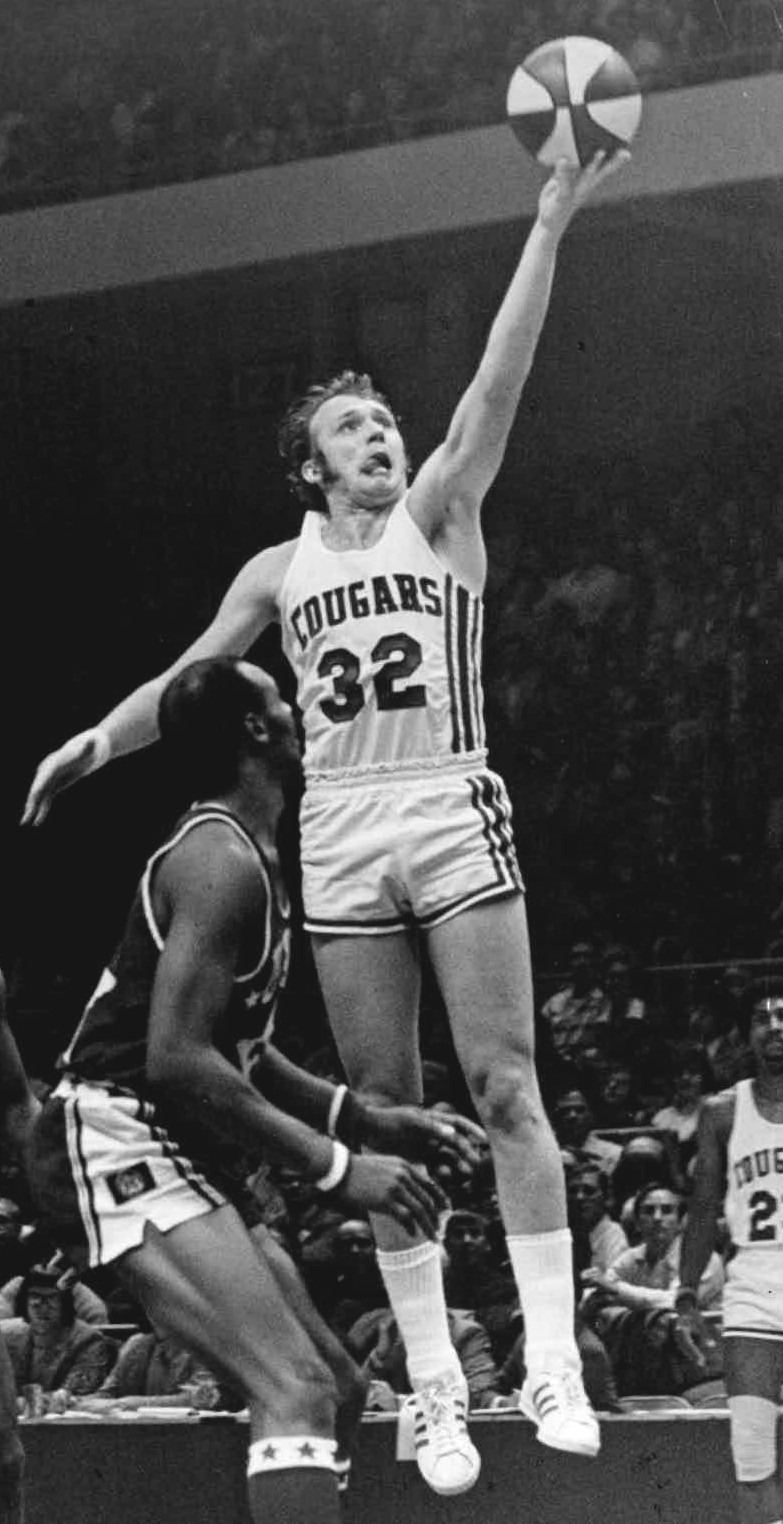
Cunningham in 1972

=== ABA and legal controversy ===
Cunningham signed a three-year contract on August 5, 1969, to begin play with the American Basketball Association's (ABA) Carolina Cougars in 1971–72. Contending that the Cougars had reneged on paying the remaining $80,000 of a $125,000 signing bonus due on May 15, 1970, he reversed himself and signed a four-year, $950,000 contract extension to stay with the 76ers through 1974–75, on July 15, 1970. The Cougars' attempt to file an injunction against him was denied in United States District Court on September 24, 1971.

The reversal of that judgment in the United States Court of Appeals 6 1/2 months later on April 5, 1972, meant that Cunningham was obligated to honor his Cougars' contract until its expiration in October 1974. He announced on June 15, 1972, that he was going to play with the Cougars beginning with the upcoming season, at press conferences in Charlotte and Greensboro, North Carolina. This occurred almost simultaneous to the Sixers' introduction of Roy Rubin as its new head coach.

=== Carolina Cougars ===
In his first ABA season (1972–73), Cunningham averaged 24.1 points per game, 12.0 rebounds per game, and led the league in total steals. He was fourth in the ABA in scoring and seventh in rebounding. Cunningham led the Cougars to the best record in the league (57–27). The Cougars were coached by future Hall of Fame coach Larry Brown, who had been Cunningham's teammate at North Carolina.

Cunningham was selected to play in the All-Star Game, was named to the All-ABA First Team, and was voted the ABA's Most Valuable Player; ahead of Julius Erving and George McGinnis (both of whom he would later coach in Philadelphia). During the post-season, the Cougars defeated the New York Nets in five games in the Eastern Division semifinals. Cunningham averaged 22.4 points, 10 rebounds, and 5.4 assists per game in that series. The Cougars lost a tight seven-game series to the Kentucky Colonels in the Eastern Division finals. Cunningham averaged 24.3 points, 13.1 rebounds, and 4.9 assists per game in that series.

In the 1973–74 season, Cunningham played in only 32 games for the Cougars. He underwent surgery in mid-December 1973 to remove a kidney blockage; and did not play again in the regular season. He ultimately underwent two surgeries. Cunningham was averaging 20.5 points and 10.3 rebounds per game when his regular season ended on December 12. The Cougars finished third in the Eastern Division.

In early April 1974, Cunningham attempted to play in the first round of the 1974 ABA playoffs against the Kentucky Colonels. He did not play in Game 1 of the Eastern Division Semifinals versus the Colonels. Cunningham was not expected to play in Game 2, except at most for a token appearance; but the team was doing poorly and Brown let Cunningham play for 17 minutes. Cunningham provided some inspiration to his teammates, though he scored only two points. He was described in the press as pale and thin. He played 20 minutes in Game 3, with 10 points, seven rebounds and two assists. In Game 4, Cunningham played 24 minutes with 10 points and seven rebounds. This was the last time Cunningham appeared in a postseason series.

=== Return to 76ers ===
In May 1974, the 76ers publicly stated they wanted Cunningham to return to play in Philadelphia. However, Cunningham himself said the matter remained to be decided; and that he would prefer to stay near his home in North Carolina rather than be part of a rebuilding organization in Philadelphia. In mid-August 1974, the Cougars were sold and the team relocated to St. Louis as the Spirits of St. Louis. At the end of September 1974, Cunningham rejoined the 76ers.

Cunningham was welcomed back by 76ers fans. He played in 80 games for the 1974–75 76ers' team, under head coach Gene Shue. Cunningham started 75 games. He averaged 35.7 minutes, 19.5 points, 9.1 rebounds, and 5.5 assists per game; but the 76ers had a 34–48 record. Cunningham believed the 76ers would be an improved team going into the 1975–76 season, with the addition of former ABA All-Star George McGinnis; and they were in first place in their division going into the season's 20th game on December 5, against the New York Knicks. Cunningham suffered a serious knee injury during that game, resulting in torn knee cartilage and ligaments, that ended his playing career, after efforts at rehabilitation were unsuccessful.

As Cunningham described it

"We were playing the Knicks in the Spectrum, and I got a defensive rebound and went all the way to our free-throw circle and my knee just exploded,” he said. “I remember I went down like I’d been shot. People tell me I screamed, but I don’t remember that. It was like I had blacked out. Nobody had touched me; they called a foul on Butch Beard, who was about 8 feet away, but they figured they had to whistle someone. I’d never had a bit of knee trouble before".

For his combined NBA and ABA career, Cunningham scored 16,310 points, grabbed 7,981 rebounds, and recorded 3,305 assists. He recorded 14 triple-doubles in the NBA and seven in the ABA, good for 51st all-time in the NBA and fifth in the ABA. He averaged a double-double for his 11-year career, with 21.2 points and 10.4 rebounds per game. He averaged 20.8 points and 10.1 rebounds per game with the 76ers, even though he began his career there as a sixth man and did not play more than 28.1 minutes per game until his fourth NBA season; and 23.1 points and 11.3 rebounds with the Cougars.

== Legacy and honors ==
In 1986, Cunningham was inducted into the Naismith Basketball Hall of Fame. In 1996, Cunningham was voted as one of the 50 Greatest Players in NBA History as part of the NBA's 50th Anniversary. In October 2021, he was also named to the NBA 75th Anniversary Team. To commemorate the NBA's 75th Anniversary The Athletic ranked their top 75 players of all time, and named Cunningham as the 66th greatest player in NBA history. Of the players named to the 75th Anniversary team, only Cunningham, Bill Russell, Bill Sharman, and Lenny Wilkens also won NBA championships as head coaches.

In 2006, he was inducted into the National Collegiate Basketball Hall of Fame's inaugural class. His North Carolina Tar Heel No. 32 jersey is retired and honored at the Dean E. Smith Center. In 2002, Cunningham was named to the ACC 50th Anniversary men's basketball team, honoring the fifty best players in ACC history.

Cunningham's No. 32 jersey is retired by the Philadelphia 76ers. In 1991, 76ers' future Hall of Fame forward Charles Barkley obtained Cunningham's permission to wear jersey No. 32 for the 1991–92 NBA season to honor Magic Johnson who had announced at the start of the season that he was HIV-positive, and had retired from the NBA. The 76ers agreed that Barkley could honor Johnson with this gesture during the 1991–92 season. Barkley had previously worn No. 34. During Cunningham's last season as the 76ers coach (1984–85), Barkley was a rookie on the 76ers.

Among his honors and accomplishments;

- Elected to Naismith Basketball Hall of Fame (1986)
- Elected to New York City Basketball Hall of Fame (1990)
- All-NBA First Team (1969, 1970, 1971)
- ABA All Star, First Team (1973)
- All-NBA Second Team (1972)
- Four-time NBA All-Star
- Elected to the ABA's All-Time Team
- Named one of the 50 Greatest Players in NBA History (1996)
- Named to the NBA 75th Anniversary Team (2021)

Among his college honors and accomplishments;

- Inducted into National Collegiate Basketball Hall of Fame (2006)
- All-Atlantic Coast Conference (1963 to 1965)
- ACC Player of the Year (1965)
- All-ACC Tournament Team (1963, 1964)
- ACC Academic All-Conference (1965)
- USBWA All-America (1964)
- Helms Foundation All-America (1965)
- Sporting News All-America second team (1965)
- Team captain (1965)
- Played in the East-West Game (1965)
- Played at the World University Games (1965)
- Named to the ACC 50th Anniversary men's basketball team, honoring the fifty best players in ACC history (2002)

== Coaching career ==
Cunningham succeeded Gene Shue as head coach of the 2–4 Philadelphia 76ers, on November 4, 1977. His first act was hiring future Hall of Fame coach Chuck Daly as an assistant coach. The 76ers went 53–23 over the remainder of the 1977–78 season under Cunningham, and ended the season in first place in the NBA's Atlantic Division. In his first playoff appearance, Cunningham led the Sixers to a four-game sweep against the New York Knicks, before losing to the Washington Bullets in six games in the Eastern Conference finals.

During Cunningham's eight-season tenure as the 76ers head coach (1977 to 1985), the team featured, among others, Bobby Jones, Maurice Cheeks, Andrew Toney, Moses Malone, and Julius Erving. He reached the 200-, 300- and 400-win milestones faster than any coach in NBA history. He led Philadelphia to the playoffs in every year as coach, and advanced to the NBA Finals three times; in the 1979–80, 1981–82 and 1982–83 seasons. The 76ers lost to the Los Angeles Lakers in 1980 and 1982, but after acquiring Moses Malone before the 1982–83 season, they finally got past the Lakers in 1983, winning the franchise's third (and most recent) NBA Championship as part of a 12–1 playoff run. The 1982–83 76ers are considered to be among the greatest teams in NBA history.

Upon his retirement on May 28, 1985, Cunningham's 454 wins as a head coach were the 12th best in NBA history. Among those who have coached at least 650 games, Cunningham holds the second-best regular-season winning percentage in league history of .698 (only Phil Jackson is ahead of him). He is still the winningest coach in Sixers history. Cunningham's playoff record as a coach is 66–39 (.629). Among those who have coached at least 100 NBA playoff games, he has the third highest winning percentage behind Jackson (.688) and Steve Kerr (.684). Former 76ers player and coach, Hall of Famer Doug Collins said Cunningham might be the greatest 76er, when looking at his overall impact on the franchise.

== Broadcasting and ownership ==
Cunningham joined the NBA television broadcast team for the CBS broadcasting network in the 1976–77 season, often paired with Brent Musburger or Don Criqui, including the 1977 All-Star Game and some playoff games; leaving after the season ended to coach the 76ers. Cunningham would later rejoin the CBS broadcast team starting with the 1985–86 season, again often paired with Musburger; covering both the NBA as well as NCAA men's college basketball for the network. In late 1987, Cunningham replaced Tom Heinsohn as the lead color commentator (alongside play-by-play man Dick Stockton) for CBS' NBA telecasts; in part because Heinsohn was perceived as having a conflict in covering the Boston Celtics, his former team. Cunningham had an ownership interest in the expansion Miami Heat, who had not yet played in the NBA; and a similar conflict could arise for him.

By at least February 1988, Cunningham was general manager as well as part owner of the Heat, prior to the franchise having played its first NBA season. He left CBS Sports in July 1988 to work with the Heat. Cunningham was subsequently replaced as CBS' top basketball analyst by Hubie Brown; but would return to CBS to help fill in briefly during the 1990 NBA playoffs, partnered with Verne Lundquist in covering a game between the Celtics and the New York Knicks. Cunningham then returned to CBS for one last year to cover the 1991 NCAA men's basketball tournament, partnered with Dick Stockton once again. In early 1995, Cunningham sold his ownership interest in the Heat.

== ABA and NBA career statistics ==
Legend
GP	Games played	GS	Games started	MPG	Minutes per game
FG%	Field goal percentage	3P%	3-point field goal percentage	FT%	Free throw percentage
RPG	Rebounds per game	APG	Assists per game	SPG	Steals per game
BPG	Blocks per game	PPG	Points per game	**Bold**	Career high
†	Won an NBA championship	*	Led the league

=== Regular season ===
Year	Team	GP	GS	MPG	FG%	3P%	FT%	RPG	APG	SPG	BPG	PPG
1965–66	Philadelphia	80*	—	26.7	.426	—	.634	7.5	2.6	—	—	14.3
1966–67†	Philadelphia	81*	—	26.8	.459	—	.686	7.3	2.5	—	—	18.5
1967–68	Philadelphia	74	—	28.1	.438	—	.723	7.6	2.5	—	—	18.9
1968–69	Philadelphia	82	—	**40.8**	.426	—	.737	12.8	3.5	—	—	24.8
1969–70	Philadelphia	81	—	39.4	.469	—	.729	**13.6**	4.3	—	—	**26.1**
1970–71	Philadelphia	81	—	36.9	.462	—	.734	11.7	4.9	—	—	23.0
1971–72	Philadelphia	75	—	38.6	.461	—	.712	12.2	5.9	—	—	23.3
1972–73	Carolina (ABA)	**84***	—	38.7	**.487**	**.286**	.789	12.0	**6.3**	**2.6**	—	24.1
1973–74	Carolina (ABA)	32	—	37.2	.471	.125	**.797**	10.3	4.7	1.8	.7	20.5
1974–75	Philadelphia	80	—	35.7	.428	—	.777	9.1	5.5	1.1	.4	19.5
1975–76	Philadelphia	20	—	32.0	.410	—	.773	7.4	5.4	1.2	**.5**	13.7
Career		770	—	34.9	.452	.263	.730	10.4	4.3	1.8	.5	21.2

=== Playoffs ===
Year	Team	GP	GS	MPG	FG%	3P%	FT%	RPG	APG	SPG	BPG	PPG
1966	Philadelphia	4	—	17.3	.161	—	**.846**	4.5	2.5	—	—	5.3
1967†	Philadelphia	**15**	—	22.6	.376	—	.656	6.2	2.2	—	—	15.0
1968	Philadelphia	3	—	28.7	**.558**	—	.824	7.3	3.3	—	—	20.7
1969	Philadelphia	5	—	**43.4**	.419	—	.632	12.6	2.4	—	—	24.4
1970	Philadelphia	5	—	41.0	.496	—	.667	10.4	4.0	—	—	**29.2**
1971	Philadelphia	7	—	43.0	.472	—	.701	**15.4**	**5.7**	—	—	25.9
1973	Carolina (ABA)	12	—	39.3	.502	**.250**	.687	11.8	5.1	—	—	23.5
1974	Carolina (ABA)	3	—	20.3	.290	.000	.800	5.3	2.0	**1.3**	**.0**	7.3
Career		54	—	32.4	.440	.167	.688	9.5	3.6	1.3	.0	19.6

== Head coaching record ==
Legend
Regular season	G	Games coached	W	Games won	L	Games lost	W–L %	Win–loss %
Playoffs	PG	Playoff games	PW	Playoff wins	PL	Playoff losses	PW–L %	Playoff win–loss %

Team	Year	G	W	L	W–L%	Finish	PG	PW	PL	PW–L%	Result
Philadelphia	1977–78	76	53	23	.697	1st in Atlantic	10	6	4	.600	Lost in Conf. Finals
Philadelphia	1978–79	82	47	35	.573	2nd in Atlantic	9	5	4	.556	Lost in Conf. Semifinals
Philadelphia	1979–80	82	59	23	.720	2nd in Atlantic	18	12	6	.667	Lost in NBA Finals
Philadelphia	1980–81	82	62	20	.756	2nd in Atlantic	16	9	7	.563	Lost in Conf. Finals
Philadelphia	1981–82	82	58	24	.707	2nd in Atlantic	21	12	9	.571	Lost in NBA Finals
Philadelphia	1982–83	82	65	17	.793	1st in Atlantic	13	12	1	.923	Won NBA Championship
Philadelphia	1983–84	82	52	30	.634	2nd in Atlantic	5	2	3	.400	Lost in First Round
Philadelphia	1984–85	82	58	24	.707	2nd in Atlantic	13	8	5	.615	Lost in Conf. Finals
Career		650	454	196	.698		105	66	39	.629	

== See also ==
- List of NBA single-game playoff scoring leaders
- List of All-Atlantic Coast Conference men's basketball teams

Preceded by Tom Heinsohn	NBA Finals television color commentator 1988	Succeeded by Hubie Brown
