= Fred Boyd (basketball) =

American basketball player (1950–2023)

Personal information
- Born: June 13, 1950 Bakersfield, California, U.S.
- Died: October 8, 2023 (aged 73) Bakersfield, California, U.S.
- Listed height: 6 ft 2 in (1.88 m)
- Listed weight: 180 lb (82 kg)

Career information
- High school: East Bakersfield (Bakersfield, California)
- College: Oregon State (1969–1972)
- NBA draft: 1972: 1st round, 5th overall pick
- Drafted by: Philadelphia 76ers
- Playing career: 1972–1978
- Position: Point guard / shooting guard
- Number: 18, 11, 4

Career history

Playing
- 1972–1976: Philadelphia 76ers
- 1976–1978: New Orleans Jazz

Coaching
- 1987–1992: Oregon State (assistant)

Career highlights
- NBA All-Rookie First Team (1973); First-team All-Pac-8 (1972); Second-team All-Pac-8 (1971)

Career statistics
- Points: 2,784 (8.5 ppg)
- Rebounds: 533 (1.6 rpg)
- Assists: 986 (3.0 apg)
- Stats at NBA.com
- Stats at Basketball Reference

Freddie L. Boyd (June 13, 1950 – October 8, 2023) was an American National Basketball Association (NBA) player whose career lasted from 1972 to 1978.

Boyd played in college for Oregon State University, and was drafted in the first round (5th pick overall) of the 1972 NBA draft by the Philadelphia 76ers.

Following his playing career, Boyd became a coach at the high school and junior high level. He also served as an assistant coach for his alma mater from 1987 to 1992. Boyd died in Bakersfield, California on October 8, 2023, at the age of 73.

== Career statistics ==
Legend
GP	Games played	GS	Games started	MPG	Minutes per game
FG%	Field goal percentage	3P%	3-point field goal percentage	FT%	Free throw percentage
RPG	Rebounds per game	APG	Assists per game	SPG	Steals per game
BPG	Blocks per game	PPG	Points per game	**Bold**	Career high
*	Led the league

=== NBA ===
==== Regular season ====
Year	Team	GP	GS	MPG	FG%	FT%	RPG	APG	SPG	BPG	PPG
1972–73	Philadelphia	**82***	**50**	**28.7**	.392	.680	**2.6**	**3.7**			**10.5**
1973–74	Philadelphia	75	26	24.2	.402	.723	1.2	3.3	.8	.1	9.5
1974–75	Philadelphia	66	13	20.6	.414	.478	1.3	2.4	.7	.1	7.0
1975–76	Philadelphia	6	0	5.5	.333	.500	.3	.3	.2	.0	.8
1975–76	New Orleans	30		19.5	.436	.571	1.0	2.6	**.9**	**.2**	5.7
1976–77	New Orleans	47		25.8	**.478**	**.806**	1.9	3.1	**.9**	.1	9.9
1977–78	New Orleans	21		17.3	.400	.636	.9	2.3	.4	.1	4.9
Career		327	89	23.6	.414	.667	1.6	3.0	.8	.1	8.5
