= 1965 NBA Finals =

1965 basketball championship series

Team	Coach	Wins
Boston Celtics	Red Auerbach	4
Los Angeles Lakers	Fred Schaus	1
- Dates: April 18–25
- Hall of Famers: Celtics: John Havlicek (1984); Tom Heinsohn (1986, player - 2015, coach); K.C. Jones (1989); Sam Jones (1984); Bill Russell (1975, player - 2021, coach); Satch Sanders (2011, contributor); John Thompson (1999, coach); Lakers: Dick Barnett (2024); Elgin Baylor (1977; did not play); Jerry West (1980); Coaches: Red Auerbach (1969); Officials: Mendy Rudolph (2007); Earl Strom (1995)
- Eastern finals: Celtics defeated 76ers, 4–3
- Western finals: Lakers defeated Bullets, 4–2

The 1965 NBA World Championship Series was the championship round of the 1965 NBA playoffs, which concluded the National Basketball Association 1964–65 season. The best-of-seven series was played between the Western Division champion Los Angeles Lakers and the Eastern Division champion Boston Celtics. The Celtics won the series over the Lakers, 4–1.

The Celtics made their ninth-straight trip to the Finals after beating the Philadelphia 76ers in a highly contested Eastern Division Finals that ended on John Havlicek's steal of the ball. The Lakers made it to their third Finals in four seasons after beating Baltimore in six games, though it came at a cost as Elgin Baylor suffered a knee injury that would sideline him for the rest of the playoffs.

This was the last NBA Finals that the Celtics played in that didn't go six or seven games until 2024.

== Team rosters ==
=== Boston Celtics ===
1964–65 Boston Celtics roster
Players

Pos.	No.	Player	Height	Weight	DOB	From
F	21	Ron Bonham	6 ft 5 in (1.96 m)	192 lb (87 kg)		Cincinnati
C	11	Mel Counts	7 ft 0 in (2.13 m)	230 lb (104 kg)		Oregon State
G/F	17	John Havlicek	6 ft 5 in (1.96 m)	203 lb (92 kg)		Ohio State
F	15	Tom Heinsohn	6 ft 7 in (2.01 m)	218 lb (99 kg)		Holy Cross
G	25	K. C. Jones	6 ft 1 in (1.85 m)	200 lb (91 kg)		San Francisco
G/F	24	Sam Jones	6 ft 4 in (1.93 m)	198 lb (90 kg)		North Carolina Central
F	12	Willie Naulls	6 ft 6 in (1.98 m)	225 lb (102 kg)		UCLA
C	6	Bill Russell	6 ft 10 in (2.08 m)	215 lb (98 kg)		San Francisco
F	16	Satch Sanders	6 ft 6 in (1.98 m)	210 lb (95 kg)		NYU
G	20	Larry Siegfried	6 ft 3 in (1.91 m)	190 lb (86 kg)		Ohio State
F/C	18	John Thompson	6 ft 10 in (2.08 m)	225 lb (102 kg)		Providence

Coaches
Head coach
- Red Auerbach

Legend
- (DP) Unsigned draft pick
- (FA) Free agent
- (S) Suspended
- Injured

Roster

=== Los Angeles Lakers ===
1964–65 Los Angeles Lakers roster
Players

Pos.	No.	Player	Height	Weight	DOB	From
SG	5	Dick Barnett	6 ft 4 in (1.93 m)	190 lb (86 kg)	1936-10-02	Tennessee State
SF	22	Elgin Baylor (injured)	6 ft 5 in (1.96 m)	225 lb (102 kg)	1934-09-16	Seattle
C	25	LeRoy Ellis	6 ft 10 in (2.08 m)	210 lb (95 kg)	1940-03-10	St. John's
SG	42	Walt Hazzard	6 ft 2 in (1.88 m)	185 lb (84 kg)	1942-04-15	UCLA
C	14	Darrall Imhoff	6 ft 10 in (2.08 m)	220 lb (100 kg)	1938-10-11	California
PG	21	Jim King	6 ft 2 in (1.88 m)	175 lb (79 kg)	1941-02-07	Tulsa
PF	35	Rudy LaRusso	6 ft 7 in (2.01 m)	220 lb (100 kg)	1937-11-11	Dartmouth
C	40	Bill McGill	6 ft 9 in (2.06 m)	225 lb (102 kg)	1939-09-16	Utah
SF	20	Don Nelson	6 ft 6 in (1.98 m)	210 lb (95 kg)	1940-05-15	Iowa
PG	44	Jerry West	6 ft 3 in (1.91 m)	175 lb (79 kg)	1938-05-28	West Virginia
C	12	Gene Wiley	6 ft 10 in (2.08 m)	210 lb (95 kg)	1937-11-12	Wichita State

Coaches
Head coach
- Fred Schaus

Legend
- (DP) Unsigned draft pick
- (FA) Free agent
- (S) Suspended
- Injured

Roster

== Series summary ==
The Celtics' average margin of victory in this series was 12.6 points, as they averaged 123.4 points a game, in contrast to the Lakers' 110.8 points per game.

Game	Date	Home team	Result	Road team
Game 1	April 18	Boston Celtics	142–110 (1–0)	Los Angeles Lakers
Game 2	April 19	Boston Celtics	129–123 (2–0)	Los Angeles Lakers
Game 3	April 21	Los Angeles Lakers	126–105 (1–2)	Boston Celtics
Game 4	April 23	Los Angeles Lakers	99–112 (1–3)	Boston Celtics
Game 5	April 25	Boston Celtics	129–96 (4–1)	Los Angeles Lakers

Celtics win series 4–1

== Box scores ==
April 18

Boxscore

Los Angeles Lakers 110, Boston Celtics 142
Scoring by quarter: 23–32, 26–32, 34–39, 27–39
Pts: Jerry West 26; Rebs: Gene Wiley 14; Asts: Walt Hazzard 5	Pts: Sam Jones 25; Rebs: Bill Russell 28; Asts: K. C. Jones 8
Boston leads series, 1–0

Boston Garden, Boston, Massachusetts
Attendance: 10,180

April 19

Boxscore

Los Angeles Lakers 123, Boston Celtics 129
Scoring by quarter: 29–35, 31–27, 29–39, 34–28
Pts: Jerry West 45; Rebs: Gene Wiley 15; Asts: Jerry West 5	Pts: John Havlicek 24; Rebs: Bill Russell 25; Asts: Bill Russell 10
Boston leads series, 2–0

Boston Garden, Boston, Massachusetts
Attendance: 13,909

April 21

Boxscore

Boston Celtics 105, Los Angeles Lakers 126
Scoring by quarter: 17–35, 31–33, 26–24, 31–34
Pts: Sam Jones 35; Rebs: Bill Russell 19; Asts: Larry Siegfried 5	Pts: Jerry West 43; Rebs: Gene Wiley 28; Asts: Jerry West 7
Boston leads series, 2–1

Los Angeles Memorial Sports Arena, Los Angeles, California
Attendance: 14,243

April 23

Boxscore

Boston Celtics 112, Los Angeles Lakers 99
Scoring by quarter: 32–24, 23–37, 33–21, 24–17
Pts: Sam Jones 37; Rebs: Bill Russell 23; Asts: Russell, K. C. Jones 5 each	Pts: LeRoy Ellis 24; Rebs: Gene Wiley 19; Asts: Wiley, Hazzard 5 each
Boston leads series, 3–1

Los Angeles Memorial Sports Arena, Los Angeles, California
Attendance: 15,217

April 25

Boxscore

Los Angeles Lakers 96, Boston Celtics 129
Scoring by quarter: 26–33, 22–24, 23–30, 25–42
Pts: Jerry West 33; Rebs: Gene Wiley 13; Asts: Walt Hazzard 10	Pts: S. Jones, Russell 22 each Rebs: Bill Russell 30; Asts: K. C. Jones 9
Boston wins series, 4–1

Boston Garden, Boston, Massachusetts
Attendance: 13,909

- Tom Heinsohn's final NBA game.

== Player statistics ==
Legend
GP	Games played	GS	Games started	MPG	Minutes per game
FG%	Field-goal percentage	3P%	3-point field-goal percentage	FT%	Free-throw percentage
RPG	Rebounds per game	APG	Assists per game	SPG	Steals per game
BPG	Blocks per game	PPG	Points per game

Boston Celtics

Boston Celtics statistics
Player	GP	GS	MPG	FG%	3P%	FT%	RPG	APG	SPG	BPG	PPG
Sam Jones	5		39.8	.470		.879	4.8	2.6			27.8
John Havlicek	5		30.2	.391		.864	5.6	2.2			18.2
Bill Russell	5		44.2	.702		.575	25.0	5.8			17.8
Satch Sanders	5		31.2	.391		.682	8.8	2.0			13.8
Tom Heinsohn	5		20.8	.361		.556	6.4	1.8			11.4
K. C. Jones	5		31.0	.460		.786	2.6	6.6			11.4
Willie Naulls	5		17.4	.396		.750	4.2	1.0			9.6
Larry Siegfried	5		13.6	.341		.786	1.6	2.4			7.8
John Thompson	3		7.0	.286		1.000	4.0	0.3			3.7
Ron Bonham	3		3.7	.375		.800	3.7	0.0			3.3
Mel Counts	3		9.0	.250		1.000	3.0	0.0			2.3

Los Angeles Lakers

Los Angeles Lakers statistics
Player	GP	GS	MPG	FG%	3P%	FT%	RPG	APG	SPG	BPG	PPG
Jerry West	5		42.0	.424		.864	5.6	3.4			33.8
LeRoy Ellis	5		39.8	.421		.676	11.0	0.8			17.8
Rudy LaRusso	5		32.0	.531		.656	6.8	2.4			14.6
Dick Barnett	5		24.4	.483		.700	3.0	2.2			14.0
Walt Hazzard	5		20.0	.326		.778	3.0	5.2			8.8
Gene Wiley	5		35.4	.516		.545	17.8	2.0			7.8
Don Nelson	5		20.6	.438		.667	5.4	1.4			7.2
Jim King	5		11.0	.429		1.000	2.0	1.4			4.2
Darrall Imhoff	5		10.8	.222		.500	2.4	0.6			1.4
Bill McGill	5		10.0	.500		1.000	3.0	1.0			3.5

== See also ==
- 1965 NBA playoffs
- 1964–65 NBA season
