= Darrall Imhoff =

American basketball player (1938–2017)

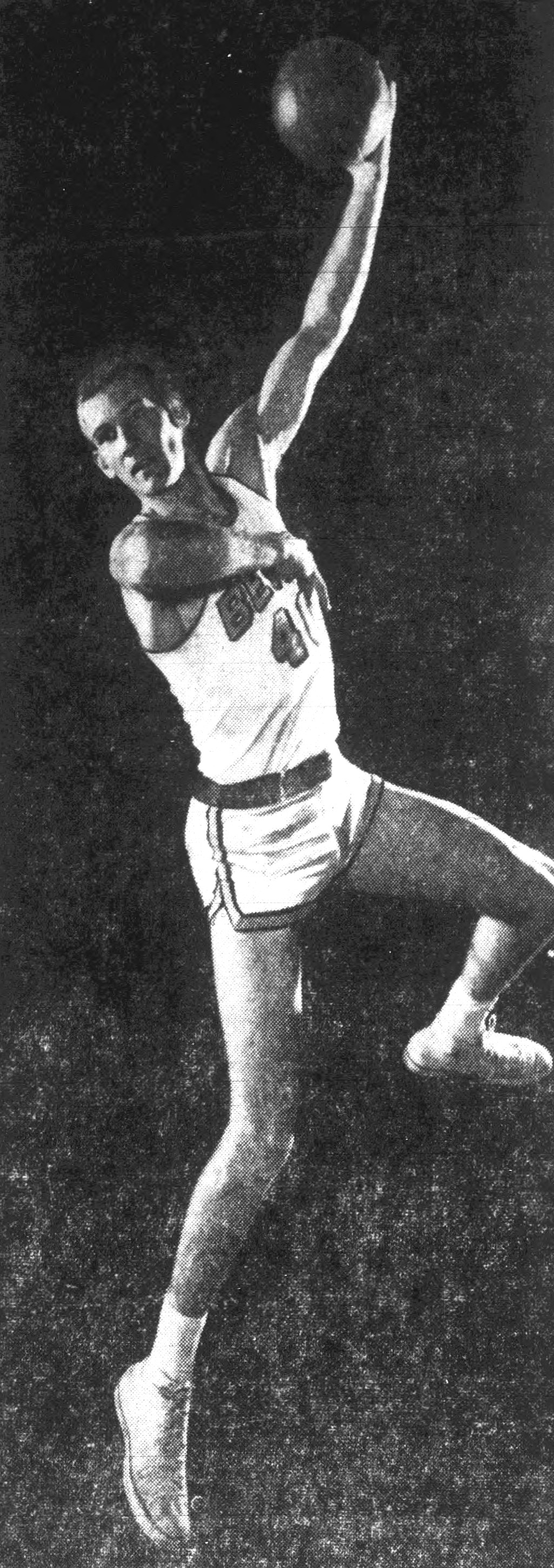
- Imhoff c. 1960

Personal information
- Born: October 11, 1938 San Gabriel, California, U.S.
- Died: June 30, 2017 (aged 78) Bend, Oregon, U.S.
- Listed height: 6 ft 10 in (2.08 m)
- Listed weight: 220 lb (100 kg)

Career information
- High school: Alhambra (Alhambra, California)
- College: California (1957–1960)
- NBA draft: 1960: 1st round, 3rd overall pick
- Drafted by: New York Knicks
- Playing career: 1960–1972
- Position: Center
- Number: 18, 17, 14, 22, 30, 35

Career history
- 1960–1962: New York Knicks
- 1962–1964: Detroit Pistons
- 1964–1968: Los Angeles Lakers
- 1968–1970: Philadelphia 76ers
- 1970–1971: Cincinnati Royals
- 1971–1972: Portland Trail Blazers

Career highlights
- NBA All-Star (1967); NCAA champion (1959); Consensus first-team All-American (1960); 2× First-team All-AAWU (1959, 1960); No. 40 retired by California Golden Bears
- Stats at NBA.com
- Stats at Basketball Reference
Medals
Men's Basketball
Representing United States
Olympic Games
Gold medal – first place	1960 Rome	Team competition

Darrall Tucker Imhoff (October 11, 1938 – June 30, 2017) was an American professional basketball player. He spent 12 seasons in the National Basketball Association (NBA), playing for six teams from 1960 to 1972. He made an NBA All-Star team, and was also an Olympic Gold medalist. He is often remembered for being one of the defenders tasked with guarding Wilt Chamberlain during his famed 100-point game in 1962.

== Early life ==
Imhoff was born October 11, 1938, to Clark and Lorraine (Tucker) Imhoff. He grew up in San Gabriel, California and attended Alhambra High School, Alhambra, California, where he played center on the school's basketball team.

== College career ==
After making the team as a walk-on at the University of California, Berkeley (Cal), Imhoff was a two-time All-American and was the top rebounder on the 1959 NCAA championship team, hitting the winning basket for Cal in the 1959 NCAA title game. He was the leading scorer (13.7 points per game) and rebounder (12.4 rebounds per game) on the 1960 NCAA runner-up Berkeley team, and was a member of the gold medal-winning 1960 U.S. men's Olympic basketball team.

As a collegian, Imhoff was a shot blocker and a rebounder around whom coach Pete Newell built his NCAA champion Cal team. Imhoff believed the team's strength and success came from the players genuine love for each other and coach Newell.

The 1958-59 Cal team led the NCAA in defense, allowing only 51 points per game. In the 1959 NCAA final four semifinal game between Cal and the University of Cincinnati, and its star Oscar Robertson, Imhoff had 22 points and 16 rebounds in the Cal victory. In the 1959 NCAA championship game, the Golden Bears edged Jerry West's West Virginia University team, 71–70. Cal was leading 69–68 with 17 seconds left when Imhoff put back his own missed shot to give Cal the winning margin.

Imhoff, Robertson and West were all named to the NCAA tournament's first team. Robertson and West went on to exceptional NBA careers, induction into the Naismith Memorial Basketball Hall of Fame, and were selected as among the 75 greatest NBA players of all time. Imhoff received second-team All-American honors as a junior in 1959, and was first-team All-Pac 10. In 1959, Imhoff was rated by some as the best college player in the country.

During its 1959-60 season, prior to tournament play, Cal limited its opponents to 48.2 points per game. The 6 ft 10 in (2.08 m) 235-pounder (106.6 kg) Imhoff anchored the nation's top-rated defense from his center spot. Newell described Imhoff's unique role as the "main spring" in Cal's defense, both in stopping his own man and helping his other teammates against players they had to defend against. Imhoff led Cal back to the NCAA championship game. Cal once again beat Cincinnati in the semifinals, where Imhoff had 11 rebounds and 25 points, before losing to Ohio State and future Hall of Famers Jerry Lucas and John Havlicek (another two of the NBA's 75 greatest player selections) in the championship game, 75–55.

Imhoff was named an Associated Press first-team All-American in 1960, along with Lucas, Robertson, West and Tony Jackson, and was a consensus first-team All-American. Imhoff would later be teammates with Lucas, West and Robertson on the men's 1960 U.S. Olympic basketball team. He was named first-team All-Pac 10 for the second year in a row, and was selected as Cal's Most Valuable Player.

He was either a two-time First Team All-American or a second-team All-American in 1959 and first-team in 1960; and a member of Berkeley's Nu chapter of Phi Kappa Tau fraternity.

Imhoff was inducted into the Cal Athletic Hall of Fame in 1988 and enshrined in the Pac-10 Hall of Honor in 2005. His jersey at Cal (No. 40) was retired during a game between Cal and Stanford at Haas Pavilion on February 14, 2009.

In 75 career games at Cal, Imhoff averaged 10.0 points and 9.5 rebounds.

== 1960 Olympics ==
Imhoff was a senior awaiting entry into the NBA in 1960 when he was among those trying out for the 1960 United States men's Olympic basketball team to compete in the Summer Olympic Games. The try outs consisted of play among an NCAA college all-star team coached by future Naismith Memorial Basketball Hall of Fame and Cal coach Pete Newell, Amateur Athletic Union (AAU) teams and Armed Forces all stars. Newell would be the U.S. Olympic coach, and Imhoff was among the college players he was involved in ultimately selecting to play on the Olympic team.

The Olympic roster also included future Naismith Memorial Basketball Hall of Fame college all-stars Bellamy, Oscar Robertson, Jerry West, and Jerry Lucas among the college players, future National Collegiate Basketball Hall of Fame player Bob Boozer of the Peoria Caterpillars among the AAU players, and Adrien Smith representing the Armed Forces all-stars. College all-star players like future Hall of Famers John Havlicek and Lenny Wilkens did not make the team.

In the Olympics, Walt Bellamy and Imhoff saw action together as center and power-forward during the Rome Games, especially against the tall Soviet national team (which included 7 ft 5 in (2.26 m) 300 pound (136.1 kg) Jan Krumnisch), as the Americans usually jetted out to a big lead early and then rested their starters. The U.S. men's team was referred to as a "dream team" at the time, winning all eight Olympic games by an average of over 40 points per game, defeating the Soviet team 81–57, and winning the gold medal game against Brazil, 90–63. It has been called the greatest amateur basketball team of all time by the Naismith Hall of Fame. Imhoff averaged 4.5 points in the 8 games as the Team USA captured the gold medal.

The entire 1960 United States men's Olympic basketball team and coaching staff was inducted into the Naismith Hall of Fame in 2011.

== NBA career ==
=== New York Knicks ===
Imhoff was the most highly publicized draft pick of the 1960 NBA draft. The New York Knicks, picking third overall, made him their first pick, a move which generated much excitement for the team. Imhoff was selected after fellow All-Americans and future Hall of Famers Oscar Robertson (No. 1) and Jerry West (No. 2), who along with Imhoff were considered the three most prominent players in the draft. Before the draft, it was recognized that Imhoff would not be a scorer in the NBA, but hoped he could be a presence against Wilt Chamberlain and Bill Russell as a mobile player and rebounder.

The Knicks had two all-stars already, Richie Guerin and Willie Naulls. They looked for Imhoff to complete a potential contender in the league's largest city if he could develop quickly, by providing rebounding and defense to go along with the scoring of Guerin, Naulls and Kenny Sears. Imhoff had a rookie season which fell below hopes, and the Knicks finished the season 21–58.

As a rookie, Imhoff averaged only 16 minutes, 4.8 rebounds and 4.7 points per game, as backup center to Phil Jordan. Robertson was Rookie of the Year, averaging 30.5 points, 9.7 assists and 10.1 rebounds per game, and West averaged 17.6 points, 4.2 assists and 7.7 rebounds per game and was an all star. In his second season, Imhoff averaged 5.9 points and 6.2 rebounds in almost 20 minutes per game; but again played behind Jordan.

Disappointed, he was the backup center by season's end. He was the starter in a March 1962 game when Philadelphia Warriors center Wilt Chamberlain set an NBA record scoring 100 points in a game. Although sometimes identified as the player who let Chamberlain score 100 points, because of foul trouble Imhoff only played 20 minutes in that game, and the majority of Chamberlain's points came when Imhoff was on the bench. Chamberlain himself considered that singling out Imhoff was unfair, as Imhoff played Chamberlain as well as anyone else, and Chamberlain's scoring increased when Imhoff was out of the game.

After the season, Imhoff was traded to the Detroit Pistons for their All-Star guard Gene Shue.

=== Detroit Pistons ===
Imhoff's lack of shooting skills at the NBA level had been exposed, but he never quit working to improve. He began to see more minutes with the Pistons until he was dealt to the Los Angeles Lakers in 1964.

Imhoff remained a backup center in the 1962-63 season, behind Bob Ferry. He averaged 2.7 points and 3.4 rebounds playing only 10.2 minutes per game. The following season, he averaged 4.8 points and 4.9 rebounds in 15 minutes per game.

=== Los Angeles Lakers ===
In April 1964, the Lakers purchased Imhoff's contract rights from the Pistons. During the 1964-65 season, he shared time at center with LeRoy Ellis and Gene Wiley. Imhoff averaged five points and 6.6 rebounds playing 20 minutes per game. On a star-studded team that included Jerry West, Elgin Baylor and others, Imhoff was now a respected reserve. He contributed solidly to a team that won the NBA Western Division and made it to the NBA Finals in 1965, where they lost to the Boston Celtics four games to one. He averaged 5.2 points and 4.3 rebounds per game in the Western Division Finals against the Baltimore Bullets as a reserve center; and played a little over 10 minutes per game in the series loss to the Celtics.

The Lakers were encouraged enough to start Imhoff the next season. Suffering injury, Imhoff again shared time at center with Ellis and Wiley, with Ellis averaging the most time per game and Wiley also averaging more than Imhoff. Los Angeles again took the Western Division, but were Finals runner-up again to the Boston Celtics.

The Lakers traded Ellis and Wiley, and Imhoff was given his first opportunity to start for the Lakers in the 1966–67 season. Imhoff realized some of his potential, averaging 10.7 points, 13.3 rebounds, and 2.7 assists in 33.6 minutes per game, and 2 blocks per game. He made the 1967 NBA All-Star Team, the first and only time he was named an All-Star. The Lakers were swept by the San Francisco Warriors three games to none in the playoffs, Imhoff averaging 10 points and 12.3 rebounds per game in that series.

Imhoff shared time at center with Erwin Mueller during the 1967–68 season, and his averages fell to 9.3 points and 10.9 rebounds in 27.7 minutes per game. After the season ended, the Lakers acquired future Hall of Fame center Wilt Chamberlain (who had been the NBA's Most Valuable Player in the 1967-68 season) from the Philadelphia 76ers in a multi-player trade that sent Imhoff, Archie Clark and Jerry Chambers to Philadelphia. After the trade, Imhoff, who considered not reporting to Philadelphia, described Chamberlain as "the greatest offensive player who ever was invented for this game."

=== Philadelphia 76ers ===
76ers coach and general manager Jack Ramsay told the hesitant Imhoff, who was concerned about playing time, moving his family, and living in Philadelphia, that he would receive playing time and convinced the 30-year old Imhoff to join the 76ers. Imhoff moved his family to Newtown Square, an area they enjoyed, overcoming that issue. Imhoff was the backup center to Luke Jackson to begin the 1968–69 season. After 25 games and an 18–7 record, Jackson suffered a season ending ruptured Achilles tendon and Imhoff became the starter. Imhoff played in every game for the 76ers that year, averaging 9.2 points and 9.7 rebounds per game overall, after serving only as a reserve in the first 25 games.

The 76ers were second in the Eastern Division in 1968–69, but were knocked out by the Boston Celtics and Russell again in the playoffs, as was the case a year earlier. Though the 76ers lost four games to one, Imhoff had an excellent series, averaging 18.2 points and 16.4 rebounds in 38.2 minutes per game.

Imhoff was a 76ers' starter again for the 1969–70 campaign, averaging a career-high 13.6 points per game, to go along with 9.5 rebounds per game. Philadelphia made it to the playoffs before losing to Milwaukee and Lew Alcindor.

=== Cincinnati Royals ===
The 76ers and Imhoff were in a salary dispute at the start of the 1970–71 season, and Imhoff was traded to the Cincinnati Royals for center Connie Dierking, Fred Foster and a second round draft pick. He became the starting center, but shared significant playing time with rookie center Sam Lacey, until he tore knee cartilage and his ACL in January 1971, and had surgery. Imhoff re-injured the knee again at the start of the next season and was put on waivers.

=== Portland Trail Blazers ===
The Portland Trail Blazers signed Imhoff as a free agent to a new contract for the remainder of the 1971–72 season. Imhoff finished his career playing 40 games in Portland as a backup center to Dale Schlueter, averaging 2.6 points and 2.7 rebounds in a little over 10 minutes of play per game. Imhoff retired with a bad knee and had surgery in January 1973 to repair his ACL.

=== Career ===
In 801 career NBA games over 12 seasons, Imhoff averaged 7.2 points, 7.6 rebounds and 1.8 assists. He was nicknamed "The Ax" for his physical playing style.

== Personal life ==
After retiring, Imhoff lived in San Jose, where he was a vice president and director of marketing for Tred 2, a company that made sporting shoes. Imhoff also lived in Hillsboro and Eugene, Oregon. He was the vice president of sales and marketing at the United States Basketball Academy (USBA), a prestigious, internationally recognized basketball camp located in Oregon's McKenzie River Valley, about 45 miles east of Eugene prior to his retirement.

He was also active in the Fellowship of Christian Athletes, the Providence Child Center and Rotary International.

He was married to wife Susan and had three daughters, Karen, Diana and Nancy, and two sons, David and Robert.

His daughter Nancy was inducted into the Idaho State University Sports Hall of Fame in 2005.

Imhoff's grandson, Damon Jones, played in Major League Baseball (MLB) for the Philadelphia Phillies.

== Death ==
Imhoff died on June 30, 2017, in Bend, Oregon, of a heart attack. He was survived by his children, 18 grandchildren and three great-grandchildren.

== NBA career statistics ==
Legend
GP	Games played	GS	Games started	MPG	Minutes per game
FG%	Field goal percentage	3P%	3-point field goal percentage	FT%	Free throw percentage
RPG	Rebounds per game	APG	Assists per game	SPG	Steals per game
BPG	Blocks per game	PPG	Points per game	**Bold**	Career high

=== Regular season ===
Year	Team	GP	MPG	FG%	FT%	RPG	APG	PPG
1960–61	New York	62	16.0	.394	.510	4.8	.8	4.7
1961–62	New York	76	19.5	.386	.576	6.2	1.1	5.9
1962–63	Detroit	45	10.2	.314	.480	3.4	.6	2.7
1963–64	Detroit	58	15.0	.414	.605	4.9	1.0	4.8
1964–65	L.A. Lakers	76	20.0	.466	.571	6.6	1.1	5.0
1965–66	L.A. Lakers	77	18.4	.448	.566	6.6	1.5	4.9
1966–67	L.A. Lakers	81	33.6	.474	.614	**13.3**	**2.7**	10.7
1967–68	L.A. Lakers	**82**	27.7	.478	.619	10.9	2.5	9.3
1968–69	Philadelphia	**82**	28.8	.470	.597	9.7	**2.7**	9.2
1969–70	Philadelphia	79	31.3	**.540**	**.650**	9.5	**2.7**	**13.6**
1970–71	Cincinnati	34	24.3	.461	.507	6.9	2.3	8.1
1971–72	Cincinnati	9	8.4	.345	.375	3.0	.2	2.6
1971–72	Portland	40	10.1	.408	.600	2.7	1.3	2.6
Career		801	22.3	.458	.594	7.6	1.8	7.2
All-Star		1	6.0	.000	–	7.0	1.0	0.0

=== Playoffs ===
Year	Team	GP	MPG	FG%	FT%	RPG	APG	PPG
1962–63	Detroit	1	2.0	–	–	1.0	.0	.0
1964–65	L.A. Lakers	11	13.7	**.542**	.583	3.9	1.2	3.0
1965–66	L.A. Lakers	14	17.4	.350	.722	5.8	2.1	2.9
1966–67	L.A. Lakers	3	28.7	**.542**	**.800**	12.3	1.7	10.0
1967–68	L.A. Lakers	**15**	29.3	.494	.510	10.9	2.0	7.6
1968–69	Philadelphia	5	**38.2**	.500	.658	**16.4**	**2.4**	**18.2**
1969–70	Philadelphia	5	27.6	.458	.143	7.0	2.2	9.0
Career		54	23.2	.478	.580	8.2	1.9	6.6
