= 1964–65 Detroit Pistons season =

NBA team season

- Head coach: Charles Wolf; Dave DeBusschere
- General manager: Don Wattrick
- Owner: Fred Zollner
- Arena: Cobo Center

Results
- Record: 31–49 (.388)
- Place: Division: 4th (Western)
- Playoff finish: Did not qualify
- Stats at Basketball Reference

Local media
- Television: WJBK
- Radio: WXYZ

The 1964–65 Detroit Pistons season was the Detroit Pistons' 17th season in the NBA and its eighth season in the city of Detroit. The team played at Cobo Arena in Detroit.

The team fired coach Charles Wolf after 11 games, naming 24-year old forward Dave DeBusschere player-manager. The Pistons finished the season 31-49 (.388), 4th in the Western Division. Before the season began, the team made a major trade to rid the team of players who had feuded with Wolf, adding Terry Dischinger, Don Kojis and Rod Thorn from the Baltimore Bullets for Bob Ferry, Bailey Howell, Les Hunter, Wali Jones and Don Ohl. The trade was the largest in NBA history at the time. Former Piston Gene Shue, coaching for Baltimore, assessed the trade thus: “Detroit has the worst management in the league.”

Detroit was led on the season by forward DeBusschere (16.7 ppg, 11.1 rpg) and guard Dischinger (18.2 ppg, NBA All-Star). Dischinger would leave the team after the season, as having a ROTC commission at Purdue, he would serve two years in the United States Army during the Vietnam War.

== Roster ==
1964–65 Detroit Pistons roster
Players

Pos.	No.	Player	Height	Weight	DOB	From
PG	24	Donnis Butcher	6 ft 2 in (1.88 m)	200 lb (91 kg)	1936–02–08	Pikeville
SF	21	Joe Caldwell	6 ft 5 in (1.96 m)	195 lb (88 kg)	1941–11–01	Arizona State
PF	22	Dave DeBusschere	6 ft 6 in (1.98 m)	220 lb (100 kg)	1940–10–16	Detroit Mercy
SG	18	Terry Dischinger	6 ft 7 in (2.01 m)	189 lb (86 kg)	1940–11–21	Purdue
PG	25	Bob Duffy	6 ft 3 in (1.91 m)	185 lb (84 kg)	1940–09–26	Colgate
C	19	Reggie Harding	7 ft 0 in (2.13 m)	249 lb (113 kg)	1942–05–04	Nashville Christian Institute
PG	5	Willie Jones	6 ft 3 in (1.91 m)	185 lb (84 kg)	1936–06–29	Northwestern
SF	16	Don Kojis	6 ft 5 in (1.96 m)	215 lb (98 kg)	1939–01–15	Marquette
PG	14	Eddie Miles	6 ft 4 in (1.93 m)	195 lb (88 kg)	1940–07–05	Seattle
PF	15	Jackie Moreland	6 ft 7 in (2.01 m)	215 lb (98 kg)	1938–03–11	Louisiana Tech
C	20 — 23	Hub Reed	6 ft 9 in (2.06 m)	215 lb (98 kg)	1936–10–04	Oklahoma City
PF	12	Ray Scott	6 ft 9 in (2.06 m)	215 lb (98 kg)	1938–07–12	Portland
SG	10	Rod Thorn	6 ft 4 in (1.93 m)	195 lb (88 kg)	1941–05–23	West Virginia

Coaches
Head coach
- Charles Wolf
- Dave DeBusschere

Legend
- (DP) Unsigned draft pick
- (FA) Free agent
- (S) Suspended
- Injured

Roster

== Regular season ==
=== Season standings ===
Western Division	W	L	PCT	GB	Home	Road	Neutral	Div
x-Los Angeles Lakers	49	31	.613	–	25–13	21–16	3–2	25–15
x-St. Louis Hawks	45	35	.563	4	26–4	15–17	4–4	28–12
x-Baltimore Bullets	37	43	.463	12	23–14	12–19	2–10	22–18
Detroit Pistons	31	49	.388	18	13–17	11–20	7–12	18–22
San Francisco Warriors	17	63	.213	32	10–26	5–31	2–6	7–33

x – clinched playoff spot

=== Game log ===
1964–65 Game log
#	Date	Opponent	Score	High points	Record
1	October 16	@ Philadelphia	113–125	Don Kojis (20)	0–1
2	October 17	@ Boston	81–112	Don Kojis (16)	0–2
3	October 21	San Francisco	104–108	Reggie Harding (22)	1–2
4	October 22	N Boston	102–104	Ray Scott (27)	1–3
5	October 24	@ New York	118–108 (OT)	Eddie Miles (30)	2–3
6	October 25	N New York	108–95	Eddie Miles (17)	2–4
7	October 30	Boston	106–90	Terry Dischinger (21)	2–5
8	October 31	@ St. Louis	99–107	DeBusschere, Scott (20)	2–6
9	November 1	@ Cincinnati	101–114	Scott, Thorn (20)	2–7
10	November 4	Baltimore	121–108	Dischinger, Harding (23)	2–8
11	November 7	@ Boston	113–130	Joe Caldwell (31)	2–9
12	November 10	N Baltimore	119–117	Rod Thorn (27)	3–9
13	November 12	San Francisco	99–121	Terry Dischinger (30)	4–9
14	November 15	Los Angeles	111–105	Dave DeBusschere (28)	4–10
15	November 18	Philadelphia	111–124	Ray Scott (29)	5–10
16	November 20	@ Baltimore	106–105	Terry Dischinger (24)	6–10
17	November 21	@ St. Louis	94–100	Rod Thorn (20)	6–11
18	November 22	@ San Francisco	99–97	Dave DeBusschere (19)	7–11
19	November 25	@ Los Angeles	117–130	Ray Scott (24)	7–12
20	November 27	@ Los Angeles	111–117	Ray Scott (33)	7–13
21	November 28	Philadelphia	101–93	Reggie Harding (20)	7–14
22	December 1	N Cincinnati	107–129	Terry Dischinger (24)	7–15
23	December 2	Cincinnati	115–125	Ray Scott (39)	8–15
24	December 4	@ Philadelphia	106–119	Don Kojis (18)	8–16
25	December 5	New York	100–110	Dave DeBusschere (25)	9–16
26	December 8	@ New York	102–100	Dave DeBusschere (23)	10–16
27	December 9	Cincinnati	122–114	Ray Scott (22)	10–17
28	December 11	@ San Francisco	104–100	Dave DeBusschere (22)	11–17
29	December 12	@ San Francisco	107–124	Terry Dischinger (19)	11–18
30	December 13	@ Los Angeles	115–116	Ray Scott (23)	11–19
31	December 15	@ Los Angeles	131–116	Terry Dischinger (27)	12–19
32	December 16	Los Angeles	126–120 (OT)	Dave DeBusschere (31)	12–20
33	December 18	St. Louis	108–114	DeBusschere, Scott (24)	13–20
34	December 19	@ Baltimore	99–104	DeBusschere, Harding (16)	13–21
35	December 25	N Boston	106–118	Rod Thorn (20)	13–22
36	December 27	N Boston	106–112	Dave DeBusschere (26)	13–23
37	December 28	N New York	117–123	DeBusschere, Dischinger (23)	14–23
38	December 30	St. Louis	125–120	Dave DeBusschere (33)	14–24
39	January 2	Boston	101–89	Donnis Butcher (17)	14–25
40	January 5	N St. Louis	109–108	Terry Dischinger (32)	14–26
41	January 6	Baltimore	129–121	Ray Scott (25)	14–27
42	January 7	@ Baltimore	105–110	Terry Dischinger (26)	14–28
43	January 9	@ New York	118–115	Terry Dischinger (30)	15–28
44	January 10	@ Cincinnati	114–140	Terry Dischinger (21)	15–29
45	January 11	N Los Angeles	127–128	Reggie Harding (29)	16–29
46	January 14	Los Angeles	104–100	Terry Dischinger (23)	16–30
47	January 18	N Philadelphia	109–95	Dave DeBusschere (23)	16–31
48	January 19	N Philadelphia	97–103	Reggie Harding (22)	17–31
49	January 20	Cincinnati	102–90	Eddie Miles (20)	17–32
50	January 22	N Philadelphia	109–103 (OT)	Joe Caldwell (24)	17–33
51	January 23	@ Cincinnati	105–102	Terry Dischinger (30)	18–33
52	January 26	N Philadelphia	105–107	Terry Dischinger (21)	19–33
53	January 27	Baltimore	108–122	Eddie Miles (25)	20–33
54	January 29	N New York	106–99	Eddie Miles (26)	20–34
55	January 30	St. Louis	97–121	Eddie Miles (21)	21–34
56	January 31	@ St. Louis	110–107	Joe Caldwell (29)	22–34
57	February 2	N Los Angeles	118–121 (OT)	Terry Dischinger (33)	23–34
58	February 3	San Francisco	106–111	Terry Dischinger (26)	24–34
59	February 5	New York	118–112 (OT)	Terry Dischinger (23)	24–35
60	February 6	@ New York	106–109	Joe Caldwell (24)	24–36
61	February 7	Baltimore	112–119	Terry Dischinger (22)	25–36
62	February 10	Boston	117–106	Reggie Harding (24)	25–37
63	February 11	N Cincinnati	109–130	Eddie Miles (19)	25–38
64	February 13	@ Baltimore	117–123	Eddie Miles (25)	25–39
65	February 16	@ San Francisco	114–106	Eddie Miles (24)	26–39
66	February 18	@ San Francisco	107–106	Eddie Miles (27)	27–39
67	February 20	St. Louis	110–98	Dave DeBusschere (21)	27–40
68	February 21	@ St. Louis	107–112	Terry Dischinger (18)	27–41
69	February 24	Philadelphia	104–106	Reggie Harding (25)	28–41
70	February 27	Cincinnati	115–117	Dave DeBusschere (21)	29–41
71	March 1	N Cincinnati	130–110	Reggie Harding (24)	30–41
72	March 3	San Francisco	107–110	Eddie Miles (28)	31–41
73	March 4	N San Francisco	115–110	Terry Dischinger (30)	31–42
74	March 6	New York	96–93	Dave DeBusschere (23)	31–43
75	March 7	@ Baltimore	105–111	Reggie Harding (23)	31–44
76	March 10	Boston	124–106	Dave DeBusschere (21)	31–45
77	March 11	N Boston	100–112	Terry Dischinger (16)	31–46
78	March 13	@ Philadelphia	116–131	Ray Scott (26)	31–47
79	March 16	Los Angeles	100–99	Dave DeBusschere (25)	31–48
80	March 20	@ St. Louis	98–107	Joe Caldwell (21)	31–49

== Awards and records ==
- Joe Caldwell, NBA All-Rookie Team 1st Team
