= Rod Thorn =

American basketball player (born 1941)

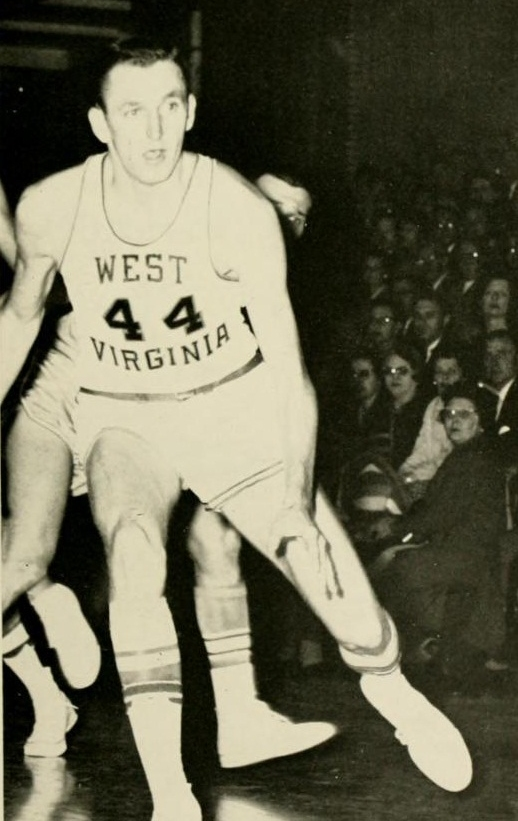
- Thorn from The Monticola, 1963

Personal information
- Born: May 23, 1941 (age 85) Princeton, West Virginia, U.S.
- Listed height: 6 ft 4 in (1.93 m)
- Listed weight: 195 lb (88 kg)

Career information
- High school: Princeton (Princeton, West Virginia)
- College: West Virginia (1960–1963)
- NBA draft: 1963: 1st round, 2nd overall pick
- Drafted by: Baltimore Bullets
- Playing career: 1963–1971
- Position: Point guard / shooting guard
- Number: 44, 10, 22
- Coaching career: 1971–1978, 1981–1982

Career history

Playing
- 1963–1964: Baltimore Bullets
- 1964–1965: Detroit Pistons
- 1965–1967: St. Louis Hawks
- 1967–1971: Seattle SuperSonics

Coaching
- 1971–1972: Seattle SuperSonics (assistant)
- 1973–1975: New York Nets (assistant)
- 1975–1976: Spirits of St. Louis
- 1976–1978: New York / New Jersey Nets (assistant)
- 1981–1982: Chicago Bulls (interim)

Career highlights
- As player: NBA All-Rookie First Team (1964); 2× Consensus second-team All-American (1962, 1963); SoCon Player of the Year (1962); No. 44 retired by West Virginia Mountaineers; Third-team Parade All-American (1959); As executive: NBA Executive of the Year (2002)

Career statistics
- Points: 5,012 (10.8 ppg)
- Rebounds: 1,463 (3.1 rpg)
- Assists: 1,214 (2.6 apg)
- Stats at NBA.com
- Stats at Basketball Reference
- Basketball Hall of Fame

Rodney King Thorn (born May 23, 1941) is an American basketball executive and a former professional player, coach and Olympic Committee chairman with a career spanning over 50 years. In 2018, Thorn was inducted into the Naismith Memorial Basketball Hall of Fame.

== Early life ==
Thorn attracted nationwide attention after a high school basketball career at Princeton High School in his hometown of Princeton, West Virginia that saw him average more than 30 points per game as a senior. He was a three-time all-state selection and was a two-time High School All-American.

Thorn was also a highly regarded high school baseball player, before a head injury took him away from the sport for a time.

Thorn was looking at colleges, including Duke University, when the West Virginia State Legislature passed a resolution designating Thorn as a state Natural Resource. This in order to persuade him to emulate native Jerry West and attend West Virginia University. Thorn did just that.

=== College career ===
Thorn attended West Virginia University. He wore #44, the same number as Jerry West, who had just graduated. At WVU, he was an All-American guard in basketball, as well as playing three seasons on the WVU baseball team.

In 1960–61, as a sophomore (freshmen could not play varsity in his era), Thorn averaged 18.5 points and 12.5 rebounds and 2.7 assists for Coach George King and the 23–4 West Virginia Mountaineers men's basketball team.

Thorn improved and West Virginia finished 24–6 in 1961–62. The Mountaineers were invited to the 1962 NCAA University Division basketball tournament, where they lost to Villanova 90–75. Thorn averaged 23.7 points and 12.1 rebounds. He was the Southern Conference Player of the Year and a Second Team All-American selection, beside John Havlicek of Ohio State University, among others.

In 1962–63, Thorn averaged 22.5 points and 9.0 rebounds as a senior. West Virginia finished 23–8 and qualified for the 1963 NCAA University Division basketball tournament. In the NCAA's, they defeated Connecticut 77–71, as Thorn had 17 points and 7 rebounds. Thorn was outstanding in the Mountaineers' 97–88 loss to St. Josephs, scoring 44 points in the defeat. He then scored 33 points with 9 rebounds in a 83–73 win over New York University in the East Region third place game, his final collegiate game. Thorn was again selected as a Second Team All-American beside Bill Bradley, among others.

Overall, Thorn averaged 21.8 points and 11.1 rebounds in 81 games during his three seasons at West Virginia.

== NBA playing career ==
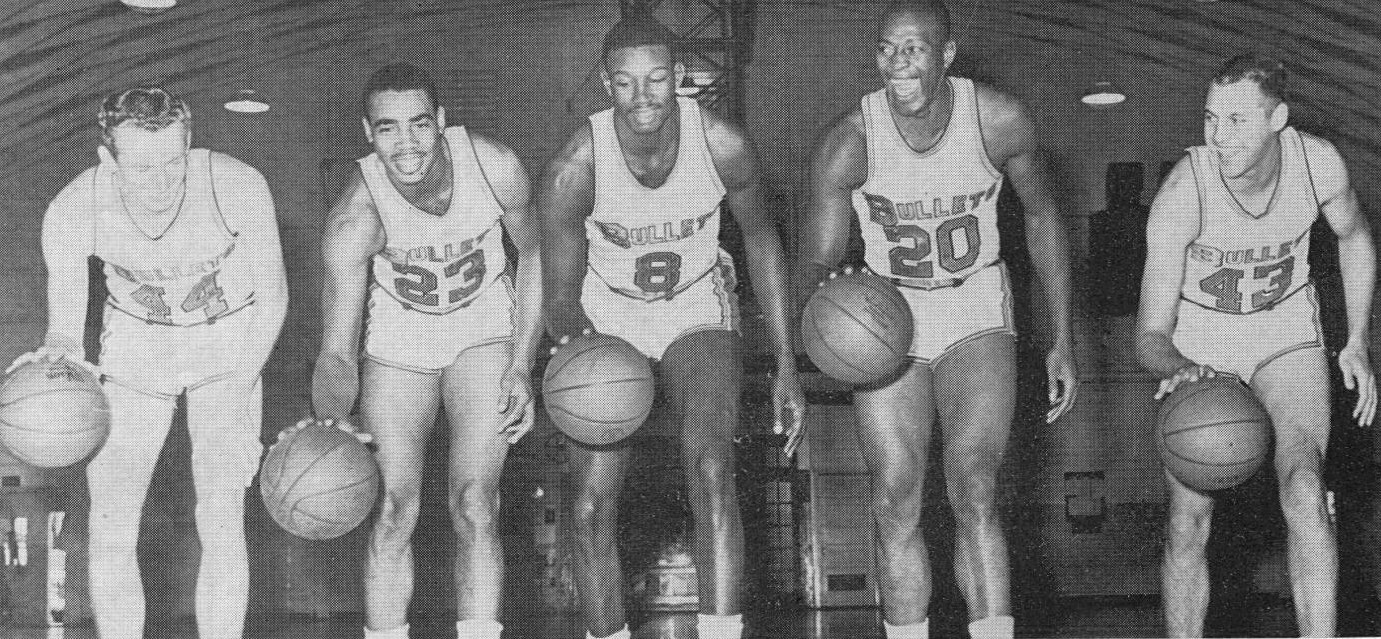
Members of the 1963–64 Baltimore Bullets, From left to rightː Rod Thorn, Charles Hardnett, Walt Bellamy, Gus Johnson and Terry Dischinger. Thorn was elected to the Naismith Basketball Hall of Fame as a contributor, Bellamy and Johnson as individual players, and Dischinger as part of the 1960 U.S. Olympic Team.

=== Baltimore Bullets ===
Thorn was the No. 2 overall pick of the 1963 NBA draft, drafted by the Baltimore Bullets.

In his rookie season 1963–64, Thorn was named to the NBA All-Rookie Team averaging 14.4 points, 4.3 rebounds and 3.7 assists for the Bullets under Hall of Fame Coach Slick Leonard.

=== Detroit Pistons ===
Following his first season, Thorn was traded on June 18, 1964. Baltimore traded Thorn, with Terry Dischinger and Don Kojis to the Detroit Pistons for Bob Ferry, future Hall of Famer Bailey Howell, Les Hunter, Wali Jones and Don Ohl. In 1964–65, Thorn averaged 10.7 points, 2.9 rebounds and 2.0 assists for the Pistons. The team did not make the playoffs under Charles Wolf (2–9) and 24-year-old player/coach Dave DeBusschere (29–40).

=== St. Louis Hawks ===
Detroit, with Thorn averaging 13.9 points, 3.7 rebounds and 2.4 assists, traded him on December 24, 1965. The Pistons sent Thorn to the St. Louis Hawks for John Tresvant and Chico Vaughn. Thorn averaged 8.8 points and 2.4 rebounds in 46 games with the Hawks as a reserve. Playing alongside Future Hall of Famers Richie Guerin (player/coach), Zelmo Beaty, Lenny Wilkens and Cliff Hagan, as well as Joe Caldwell, Paul Silas and Bill Bridges, Thorn saw his minutes reduced. The Hawks lost the Los Angeles Lakers in the Western Division Finals 4–3 after having beaten Baltimore 3–0 to advance.

In 1966–67, Thorn averaged 8.8 points and 2.4 rebounds for the Hawks as they added Lou Hudson and finished 39–42. The Hawks defeated the expansion Chicago Bulls 3–0 in the playoffs, before losing to the San Francisco Warriors with Rick Barry and Nate Thurmond 4–2 in the Western Division finals. Thorn averaged 10.2 points in the series.

=== Seattle SuperSonics ===
On May 1, 1967, Thorn was drafted by the expansion Seattle SuperSonics from the St. Louis Hawks in the NBA expansion draft. He concluded his career as a player with the Seattle SuperSonics (1967–1971).

Thorn averaged a career high 15.2 points with 4.0 rebounds and 3.5 assists, in 1967–68, as the expansion SuperSonics finished 23–58 under Coach Al Bianchi.

The SuperSonics improved to 30–52 in 1968–69, with Thorn averaging 11.5 points, 2.9 rebounds and 2.8 assists at age 27.

Thorn's teammate from St. Louis, Lenny Wilkens became the player/Coach of the SuperSonics in 1969–70 and the team improved to 36–46, in Wilkens' first Coaching season. Wilkens would lead the SuperSonics to the NBA Championship in 1979, and would coach in the NBA until 2005, winning 1332 games in 32 seasons. Injured, Thorn averaged 2.9 points in 19 games.

In 1970–71, Thorn finished his playing career, playing in 63 games off the bench, averaging 5.6 points and 2.9 assists for the 38–44 SuperSonics.

Overall, in eight NBA seasons, Thorn averaged 10.8 points, 3.1 rebounds and 2.6 assists in 466 games.

== Coaching career ==
In 1971–72, Thorn joined his former teammate and coach Lenny Wilkens as an assistant with the SuperSonics and the team finished 47–35.

In 1973, former teammate Kevin Loughery was head coach and hired Thorn as assistant coach of the New York Nets of the American Basketball Association for $15,000. The Nets then won the 1974 ABA championship, led by Julius Erving.

Thorn was hired the head coach of the Spirits of St. Louis with then-star Marvin Barnes for the 1975–76 ABA season. The Spirits' roster also included Hall of Famer Moses Malone, Caldwell Jones, Mike D'Antoni, Gus Gerard, Maurice Lucas, Ron Boone, M.L. Carr and Don Chaney, but after a 20–27 start he was fired in December, 1975 and replaced by Joe Mullaney.

Thorn had discipline issues with Barnes. "Marvin would come late for everything,” Thorn said years later. "You couldn't depend on him. He'd say, 'I'm giving you 24 and 12 every night. You better talk to the others.' He'd come late on purpose to show, 'You don't control me. I'm in charge.'"

Thorn returned to the New York Nets and Loughery as an assistant coach when the franchise joined the NBA in 1976–77. The team had been forced to move Erving to the Philadelphia 76ers and was playing with a depleted roster. Thorn left the position after the 1977–78 season to move to the front office in Chicago.

== Basketball executive career ==
=== Chicago Bulls ===
In 1978, Thorn became the general manager of the Chicago Bulls and served in that role until March 1985. Thorn hired Jerry Sloan as head coach, drafted Reggie Theus and had Artis Gilmore in the middle. Thorn replaced Sloan on the bench to finish the 1981–82 season (15–15).

Thorn hired Kevin Loughery, his former teammate and coach with Nets, as head coach in 1983.

In 1984, he famously oversaw team's selection of Michael Jordan with the No. 3 pick of the 1984 NBA draft. (he also selected track star Carl Lewis, with the draft on the eve of the 1984 Olympic Games, simply for patriotic publicity purposes).

Thorn negated numerous trade offers for the Bulls' No. 3 pick in 1984. There was maneuvering for Jordan to go to Philadelphia where North Carolina star Billy Cunningham was the 76ers coach. There was further speculation Thorn might select Jordan's North Carolina's teammate Sam Perkins, (who was drafted at No. 4), because the Bulls had recently selected shooting guards in previous drafts and Thorn had just traded All-Star Reggie Theus. However, Thorn drafted Jordan, and the Bulls' foundation was in place.

Thorn left the Bulls when he and Loughery were fired in March 1985 and new owner Jerry Reinsdorf hired Jerry Krause as G.M.

=== NBA/Dream Team/Nets/76ers ===
From 1986 to 2000 Thorn was the NBA's executive vice president of basketball operations, serving as the league's chief disciplinarian.

Thorn chaired the USA Basketball Men's National Team Selection Committee in 1992, 1996 and 2000. The "Dream Team" for the 1992 Summer Olympics (Barcelona) was assembled and the committee put together the Olympic gold-medal USA teams in 1996 and 2000.

Thorn rejoined the Nets organization on June 2, 2000, and he was named the NBA Executive of the Year in 2002 after the Nets advanced to the NBA Finals for the first time in franchise history. During the 2010 offseason, Rod Thorn announced he would step down from the Nets' organization.

On August 11, 2010, Thorn was hired as president of the 76ers, taking over the title from Ed Stefanski, who remained with the team as the general manager.

On October 18, 2011, prior to a press conference introducing the 76ers' new ownership group, it was announced that Stefanski was leaving the organization and Thorn would be both president and general manager. In 2012, Tony DiLeo was named the team's general manager, but Thorn retained his title as president.

On July 10, 2013, the National Basketball Association announced that Rod Thorn had been named president of basketball operations, effective August 1, after Stu Jackson decided to step down.

On April 26, 2014, Thorn, on behalf of the NBA, suspended Wizard Nene Hilario from game 4 of the first round of the NBA playoffs.

In 2015, Thorn briefly retired from the NBA.

In 2015, Thorn, semi-retired, became a Special Consultant for the Milwaukee Bucks.

Of his career, “I’ve been unbelievably fortunate to be in the right place so many times,” said Thorn. "To come from a place with 7,000 people sometimes you pinch yourself and think, 'Wow, how fortunate I've been.' When I played we got $8 in meal money. We were like a barnstorming league. I can remember playing 16 straight days in preseason in one little high school after the next. You couldn't tell me the NBA would end up where it is and I would be a first hand witness to so many great things. That's one of the things I'm proudest of, just being on the scene and sometimes having a little something to do with what transpired. It's been a lot of fun."

== Personal life ==
He graduated from the University of Washington with a degree in political science while playing and coaching for the SuperSonics.

Thorn and his wife, Peggy, have a son, Jonathan, and twin daughters, Amanda and Jessica and son JJ.

"I'm not sure there are any others who have the hard earned understanding of the game," former NBA commissioner David Stern said about Thorn. "People forget he drafted Michael Jordan, forget the Nets (under Thorn) were in the Finals two years in a row (after he pulled off the Jason Kidd trade), forget he was with the 76ers when they beat the Bulls in the playoffs as an eighth seed. He has a unique background and a unique personal approach."

== Honors ==
- Thorn was inducted into the West Virginia University Sports Hall of Fame in 1982.
- On September 7, 2018, Thorn was enshrined in the Naismith Memorial Basketball Hall of Fame as a contributor.
- On February 29, 2020, Thorn's number 44 was retired by West Virginia University.

== NBA career statistics ==
Legend
GP	Games played	GS	Games started	MPG	Minutes per game
FG%	Field goal percentage	3P%	3-point field goal percentage	FT%	Free throw percentage
RPG	Rebounds per game	APG	Assists per game	SPG	Steals per game
BPG	Blocks per game	PPG	Points per game	**Bold**	Career high

=== Regular season ===
Year	Team	GP	GS	MPG	FG%	3P%	FT%	RPG	APG	SPG	BPG	PPG
1963–64	Baltimore	**75**	—	**34.6**	.405	—	.731	**4.8**	**3.7**	—	—	14.4
1964–65	Detroit	74	—	23.9	.427	—	.724	3.6	2.2	—	—	11.0
1965–66	Detroit	27	—	30.2	.417	—	.732	3.7	2.4	—	—	13.9
1965–66	St. Louis	46	—	20.1	.423	—	.690	2.4	1.8	—	—	8.8
1966–67	St. Louis	67	—	17.4	.445	—	.727	2.4	1.8	—	—	8.8
1967–68	Seattle	66	—	25.3	.451	—	**.737**	4.0	3.5	—	—	**15.2**
1968–69	Seattle	29	—	19.6	.463	—	.732	2.9	2.8	—	—	11.5
1969–70	Seattle	19	—	5.5	.444	—	.625	.8	.9	—	—	2.9
1970–71	Seattle	63	—	12.2	**.472**	—	.676	1.6	2.9	—	—	5.6
Career		466	—	22.3	.433	—	.723	3.1	2.6	—	—	10.8

=== Playoffs ===
Year	Team	GP	GS	MPG	FG%	3P%	FT%	RPG	APG	SPG	BPG	PPG
1966	St. Louis	**10**	—	11.9	.308	—	.778	1.7	1.0	—	—	3.8
1967	St. Louis	9	—	**17.3**	**.429**	—	**.926**	**3.1**	**1.2**	—	—	**10.1**
Career		19	—	14.5	.388	—	.867	2.4	1.1	—	—	6.8

== Head coaching record ==
=== ABA ===
Team	Year	G	W	L	W–L%	Finish	PG	PW	PL	PW–L%	Result
St. Louis	1975–76	47	20	27	.426	(left mid–season)	—	—	—	—	—
Career		47	20	27	.426		0	0	0	–	

=== NBA ===
Team	Year	G	W	L	W–L%	Finish	PG	PW	PL	PW–L%	Result
Chicago	1981–82	30	15	15	.500	5th in Central	—	—	—	—	Missed playoffs
Career		30	15	15	.500		0	0	0	–	
