= 1964–65 Los Angeles Lakers season =

Season of National Basketball Association team the Los Angeles Lakers

- Division champions
- Head coach: Fred Schaus
- Arena: Los Angeles Memorial Sports Arena

Results
- Record: 49–31 (.613)
- Place: Division: 1st (Western)
- Playoff finish: NBA Finals (lost to Celtics 1–4)
- Stats at Basketball Reference

Local media
- Television: KTTV
- Radio: KFI

The 1964–65 Los Angeles Lakers season was the Lakers' 17th season in the NBA and fifth season in Los Angeles.

The team reached the NBA Finals, only to fall against the Boston Celtics in five games.

== Roster ==
1964–65 Los Angeles Lakers roster
Players

Pos.	No.	Player	Height	Weight	DOB	From
SG	5	Dick Barnett	6 ft 4 in (1.93 m)	190 lb (86 kg)	1936-10-02	Tennessee State
SF	22	Elgin Baylor	6 ft 5 in (1.96 m)	225 lb (102 kg)	1934-09-16	Seattle
C	25	LeRoy Ellis	6 ft 11 in (2.11 m)	210 lb (95 kg)	1940-03-10	St. John's
SG	42	Walt Hazzard	6 ft 2 in (1.88 m)	185 lb (84 kg)	1942-04-15	UCLA
C	14	Darrall Imhoff	6 ft 10 in (2.08 m)	220 lb (100 kg)	1938-10-11	California
PG	21	Jim King	6 ft 2 in (1.88 m)	175 lb (79 kg)	1941-02-07	Tulsa
PF	35	Rudy LaRusso	6 ft 8 in (2.03 m)	220 lb (100 kg)	1937-11-11	Dartmouth
C	40	Bill McGill	6 ft 9 in (2.06 m)	225 lb (102 kg)	1939-09-16	Utah
SF	20	Don Nelson	6 ft 6 in (1.98 m)	210 lb (95 kg)	1940-05-15	Iowa
PG	44	Jerry West	6 ft 3 in (1.91 m)	175 lb (79 kg)	1938-05-28	West Virginia
C	12	Gene Wiley	6 ft 10 in (2.08 m)	210 lb (95 kg)	1937-11-12	Wichita State

Coaches
Head coach
- Fred Schaus

Legend
- (DP) Unsigned draft pick
- (FA) Free agent
- (S) Suspended
- Injured

Roster
Updated: January 28, 1965

== Regular season ==
=== Standings ===
Western Division	W	L	PCT	GB	Home	Road	Neutral	Div
x-Los Angeles Lakers	49	31	.613	–	25–13	21–16	3–2	25–15
x-St. Louis Hawks	45	35	.563	4	26–4	15–17	4–4	28–12
x-Baltimore Bullets	37	43	.463	12	23–14	12–19	2–10	22–18
Detroit Pistons	31	49	.388	18	13–17	11–20	7–12	18–22
San Francisco Warriors	17	63	.213	32	10–26	5–31	2–6	7–33

x – clinched playoff spot

=== Game log ===
1964–65 game log
#	Date	Opponent	Score	High points	Record
1	October 17	@ New York	113–109	Jerry West (35)	1–0
2	October 20	@ Cincinnati	113–121	Jerry West (26)	1–1
3	October 21	@ Baltimore	108–105	Jerry West (33)	2–1
4	October 23	@ San Francisco	94–92	Jerry West (28)	3–1
5	October 28	Baltimore	102–112	Jerry West (32)	4–1
6	October 29	Baltimore	98–95	Jerry West (28)	4–2
7	November 1	St. Louis	116–115	Jerry West (35)	4–3
8	November 5	New York	96–106	Jerry West (31)	5–3
9	November 7	San Francisco	103–130	Jerry West (29)	6–3
10	November 10	New York	101–108	Jerry West (27)	7–3
11	November 12	@ New York	132–123 (OT)	Elgin Baylor (35)	8–3
12	November 13	@ Boston	114–112	Elgin Baylor (36)	9–3
13	November 14	@ Baltimore	115–127	Dick Barnett (26)	9–4
14	November 15	@ Detroit	111–105	Jerry West (36)	10–4
15	November 18	Cincinnati	92–90	Elgin Baylor (28)	10–5
16	November 20	Cincinnati	121–131	Jerry West (37)	11–5
17	November 25	Detroit	117–130	Jerry West (35)	12–5
18	November 27	Detroit	111–117	Jerry West (33)	13–5
19	November 28	@ San Francisco	106–109	Jerry West (33)	13–6
20	November 29	Baltimore	110–126	Jerry West (30)	14–6
21	December 1	@ Philadelphia	118–117	Jerry West (34)	15–6
22	December 2	@ St. Louis	102–105	Elgin Baylor (35)	15–7
23	December 4	@ Cincinnati	90–104	Dick Barnett (28)	15–8
24	December 6	N Philadelphia	104–109	Jerry West (30)	16–8
25	December 8	Boston	108–98	Jerry West (34)	16–9
26	December 10	St. Louis	95–91	Jerry West (34)	16–10
27	December 13	Detroit	115–116	Elgin Baylor (35)	17–10
28	December 15	Detroit	131–116	Jerry West (34)	17–11
29	December 16	@ Detroit	126–120 (OT)	Jerry West (39)	18–11
30	December 18	@ Cincinnati	107–111	Elgin Baylor (39)	18–12
31	December 19	Philadelphia	140–113	LeRoy Ellis (32)	18–13
32	December 21	New York	113–125	Elgin Baylor (40)	19–13
33	December 23	Philadelphia	117–135	Elgin Baylor (43)	20–13
34	December 26	San Francisco	122–129	Jerry West (44)	21–13
35	December 28	@ Boston	112–133	Barnett, Ellis (23)	21–14
36	December 30	@ Philadelphia	115–117	Elgin Baylor (37)	21–15
37	January 2	@ St. Louis	115–112	Elgin Baylor (40)	22–15
38	January 3	@ St. Louis	99–92	Jerry West (34)	23–15
39	January 7	Boston	112–104	Elgin Baylor (32)	23–16
40	January 9	Boston	107–103	Jerry West (33)	23–17
41	January 11	N Detroit	127–128	Jerry West (41)	23–18
42	January 14	@ Detroit	104–100	Elgin Baylor (38)	24–18
43	January 15	@ Cincinnati	106–124	Elgin Baylor (34)	24–19
44	January 17	@ St. Louis	105–118	Elgin Baylor (26)	24–20
45	January 18	New York	103–119	Jerry West (38)	25–20
46	January 22	New York	107–117	Jerry West (29)	26–20
47	January 24	@ Boston	93–117	Elgin Baylor (30)	26–21
48	January 26	@ New York	111–99	Jerry West (47)	27–21
49	January 27	Cincinnati	112–119	Jerry West (42)	28–21
50	January 29	Cincinnati	133–137 (2OT)	Jerry West (53)	29–21
51	January 30	@ San Francisco	109–99	Jerry West (33)	30–21
52	January 31	San Francisco	94–96	Elgin Baylor (27)	31–21
53	February 2	N Detroit	118–121 (OT)	Elgin Baylor (47)	31–22
54	February 3	@ Cincinnati	99–130	Elgin Baylor (27)	31–23
55	February 6	@ Baltimore	112–116	Jerry West (39)	31–24
56	February 7	@ Boston	97–101	Jerry West (36)	31–25
57	February 8	Philadelphia	98–117	Jerry West (29)	32–25
58	February 10	Philadelphia	110–99	Jerry West (29)	32–26
59	February 12	San Francisco	95–114	Jerry West (29)	33–26
60	February 13	@ San Francisco	129–105	Jerry West (30)	34–26
61	February 17	@ New York	118–98	Barnett, Baylor (23)	35–26
62	February 18	@ Philadelphia	117–110	Elgin Baylor (34)	36–26
63	February 19	@ Baltimore	119–111	Jerry West (36)	37–26
64	February 21	Boston	114–129	Jerry West (47)	38–26
65	February 24	Boston	97–95	Jerry West (29)	38–27
66	February 26	St. Louis	90–106	Elgin Baylor (34)	39–27
67	February 28	N Philadelphia	118–122	Jerry West (44)	40–27
68	March 2	N Philadelphia	117–126	Jerry West (34)	41–27
69	March 3	@ Boston	104–102	Jerry West (30)	42–27
70	March 5	@ New York	105–103	Jerry West (33)	43–27
71	March 6	@ St. Louis	107–109	Elgin Baylor (31)	43–28
72	March 7	Cincinnati	104–106	Elgin Baylor (38)	44–28
73	March 9	Baltimore	114–123	Baylor, West (37)	45–28
74	March 11	Baltimore	116–121 (OT)	Jerry West (38)	46–28
75	March 12	@ San Francisco	115–93	Jerry West (33)	47–28
76	March 13	St. Louis	101–106	Jerry West (37)	48–28
77	March 14	St. Louis	115–108	Rudy LaRusso (27)	48–29
78	March 16	@ Detroit	100–99	Rudy LaRusso (31)	49–29
79	March 17	@ Baltimore	106–117	Dick Barnett (34)	49–30
80	March 20	San Francisco	112–98	Jerry West (24)	49–31

== Playoffs ==
1965 playoff game log
Division finals: 4–2 (home: 3–0; road: 1–2)

Game	Date	Team	Score	High points	High rebounds	High assists	Location Attendance	Series
1	April 3	Baltimore	W 121–115	Jerry West (49)	LeRoy Ellis (15)	Jerry West (8)	Los Angeles Memorial Sports Arena; 14,579	1–0
2	April 5	Baltimore	W 118–115	Jerry West (52)	Gene Wiley (12)	Jerry West (9)	Los Angeles Memorial Sports Arena; 10,594	2–0
3	April 7	@ Baltimore	L 115–122	Jerry West (44)	Gene Wiley (13)	Jerry West (4)	Baltimore Civic Center; 7,247	2–1
4	April 9	@ Baltimore	L 112–114	Jerry West (48)	Rudy LaRusso (14)	Jerry West (5)	Baltimore Civic Center; 10,642	2–2
5	April 11	Baltimore	W 120–112	Jerry West (43)	LeRoy Ellis (18)	Jerry West (7)	Los Angeles Memorial Sports Arena; 15,013	3–2
6	April 13	@ Baltimore	W 117–115	Jerry West (42)	LeRoy Ellis (10)	Jerry West (8)	Baltimore Civic Center; 8,590	4–2

NBA Finals: 1–4 (home: 1–1; road: 0–3)

Game	Date	Team	Score	High points	High rebounds	High assists	Location Attendance	Series
1	April 18	@ Boston	L 110–142	Jerry West (26)	Gene Wiley (14)	Walt Hazzard (5)	Boston Garden; 13,909	0–1
2	April 19	@ Boston	L 123–129	Jerry West (45)	Gene Wiley (15)	Jerry West (5)	Boston Garden; 13,909	0–2
3	April 21	Boston	W 126–105	Jerry West (43)	Gene Wiley (28)	Jerry West (7)	Los Angeles Memorial Sports Arena; 14,243	1–2
4	April 23	Boston	L 99–112	LeRoy Ellis (24)	Gene Wiley (19)	Wiley, Hazzard (5)	Los Angeles Memorial Sports Arena; 15,217	1–3
5	April 25	@ Boston	L 96–129	Jerry West (33)	Gene Wiley (13)	Walt Hazzard (10)	Boston Garden; 13,909	1–4

1965 schedule

== Awards and records ==
- Elgin Baylor, All-NBA First Team
- Jerry West, All-NBA First Team
- Elgin Baylor, NBA All-Star Game
- Jerry West, NBA All-Star Game
