= Walt Hazzard =

American professional basketball player and coach (1942–2011)

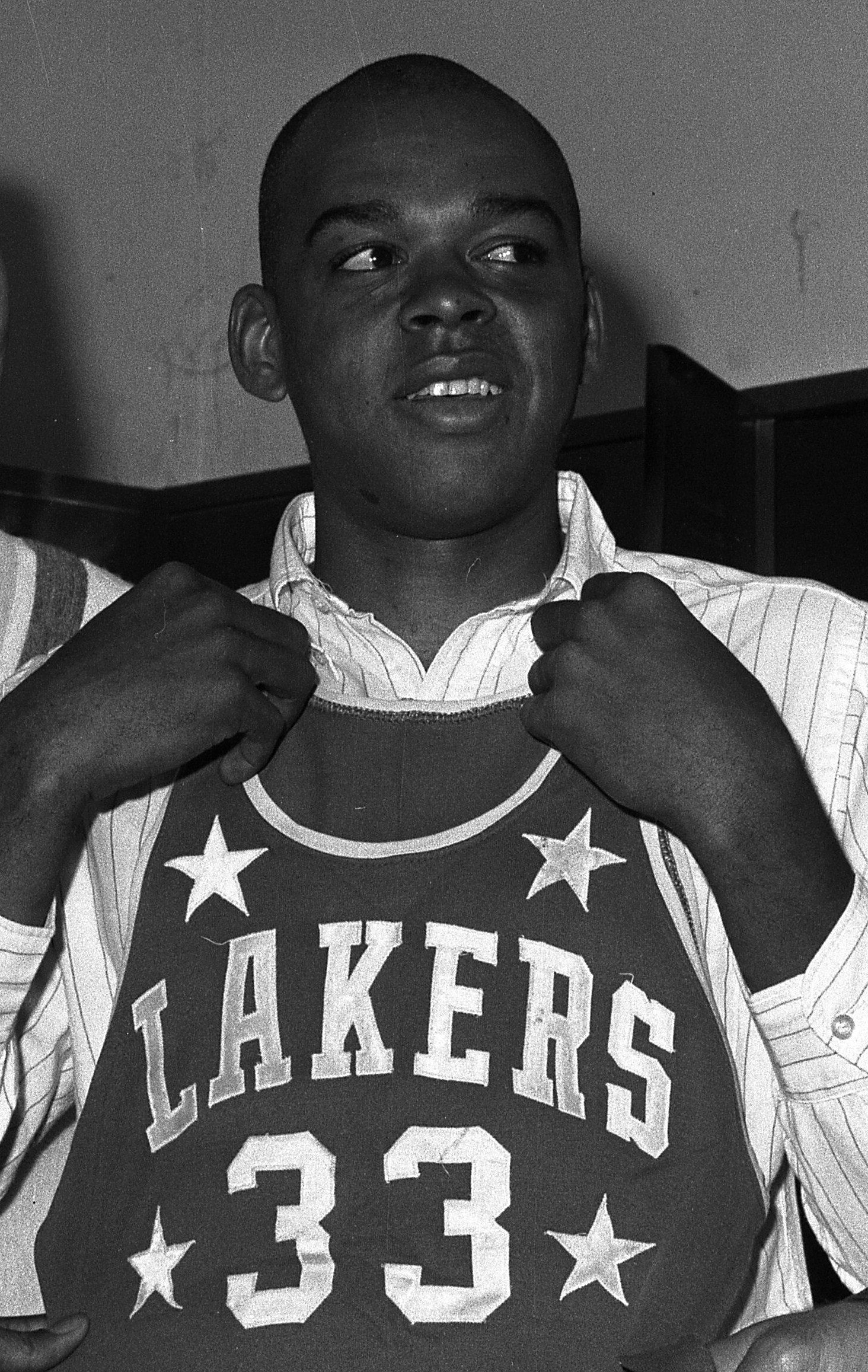
- Hazzard with the Los Angeles Lakers in 1964

Personal information
- Born: April 15, 1942 Wilmington, Delaware, U.S.
- Died: November 18, 2011 (aged 69) Los Angeles, California, U.S.
- Listed height: 6 ft 2 in (1.88 m)
- Listed weight: 185 lb (84 kg)

Career information
- High school: Moton (Easton, Maryland); Overbrook (Philadelphia, Pennsylvania)
- College: UCLA (1961–1964)
- NBA draft: 1964: territorial pick
- Drafted by: Los Angeles Lakers
- Playing career: 1964–1974
- Position: Point guard / shooting guard
- Number: 42, 1, 44
- Coaching career: 1980–1988

Career history

Playing
- 1964–1967: Los Angeles Lakers
- 1967–1968: Seattle SuperSonics
- 1968–1971: Atlanta Hawks
- 1971–1972: Buffalo Braves
- 1972–1973: Golden State Warriors
- 1973–1974: Seattle SuperSonics

Coaching
- 1980–1982: Compton CC
- 1982–1984: Chapman
- 1984–1988: UCLA

Career highlights
- As player: NBA All-Star (1968); NCAA champion (1964); NCAA Final Four MOP (1964); USBWA Player of the Year (1964); Helms Player of the Year (1964); Consensus first-team All-American (1964); First-team All-American – USBWA (1963); Second-team All-American – AP, NABC (1963); Third-team All-American – UPI (1963); 2× First-team All-AAWU (1963, 1964); No. 42 retired by UCLA Bruins; As coach: NIT champion (1985); Pacific-10 tournament champion (1987); Pacific-10 regular season champion (1987); Pacific-10 Coach of the Year (1987)

Career statistics
- Points: 9,087 (12.6 ppg)
- Rebounds: 2,146 (3.0 rpg)
- Assists: 3,555 (4.9 apg)
- Stats at NBA.com
- Stats at Basketball Reference
- Collegiate Basketball Hall of Fame
Medals
Men's basketball
Representing United States
Olympic Games
Gold medal – first place	1964 Tokyo	Team competition

Mahdi Abdul-Rahman (born Walter Raphael Hazzard Jr.; April 15, 1942 – November 18, 2011) was an American professional basketball player and college basketball coach. He played in college for the UCLA Bruins and was a member of their first national championship team in 1964. He also won a gold medal that year with the US national team at the 1964 Summer Olympics. Hazzard began his pro career in the National Basketball Association (NBA) with the Los Angeles Lakers, who selected him a territorial pick in the 1964 NBA draft. He was named an NBA All-Star with the Seattle SuperSonics in 1968. After his playing career ended, he was the head coach at UCLA during the 1980s.

== College career ==
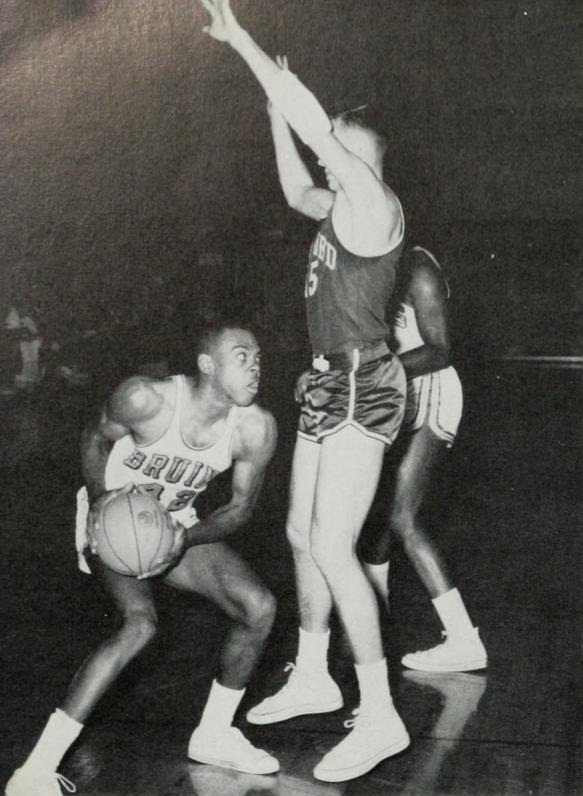
Hazzard at UCLA in 1964

Hazzard attended Overbrook High School in Philadelphia, where his teams went 89–3 and he was named the city's player of the year when he was a senior. Hazzard went on to the University of California, Los Angeles, where he became a key player on the Bruins varsity basketball team. In Hazzard's first season on the varsity squad, UCLA made their first Final Four appearance in the 1962 NCAA tournament. They lost 72–70 to eventual champion Cincinnati in the semi-finals.

UCLA's first undefeated season in 1963–64 was in no small part due to Hazzard, his backcourt partner Gail Goodrich, and coach John Wooden. The team won its first NCAA Championship, and Hazzard was selected by the Associated Press as the tournament's Most Valuable Player. Following UCLA's victory in the 1964 tournament, Sports Illustrated featured a cover photograph of Walt Hazzard dribbling the basketball up court and the headline, "UCLA Is The Champ. Walt Hazzard Drives Through Duke." Hazzard was chosen as an All-American and also selected as College Player of the Year by the United States Basketball Writers Association (USBWA). His number 42 jersey was retired by UCLA in 1996 in Pauley Pavilion, but Hazzard gave his permission for stand-out recruit Kevin Love to wear the number.

Hazzard and Bill Bradley earned a spot on the 1964 Olympic basketball team for the U.S., which unsurprisingly won the gold medal. He was pre-draft territorial pick in 1964 by the Los Angeles Lakers.

== NBA career ==
Hazzard later played in the NBA, first with the Los Angeles Lakers from 1964 to 1967, then the Seattle SuperSonics, the Atlanta Hawks, the Buffalo Braves, and briefly for the Golden State Warriors. He returned to the SuperSonics for the 1973–74 season, after which he retired from professional basketball.

While playing for the SuperSonics in their inaugural 1967–68 season, Hazzard scored a career high 24.0 points per game, averaged 6.2 assists per game, and was selected to play in the 1968 NBA All-Star Game. Seattle traded him to the Hawks during the off-season for Lenny Wilkens. Hazzard's career-high average in assists came during the 1969–70 season, when he averaged 6.8 assists per game while playing for the Hawks.

== Coaching career ==
In 1980, Hazzard took a part-time position paying $1,500 annually to be the head coach at Compton Community College. He compiled a 53–9 record in his two seasons, but 21 wins from the first season were later forfeited because he used an ineligible player. According to Hazzard, poor records from the season before his arrival failed to note that the ineligible player had played that season. He went on to Division II school Chapman College, where he coach two seasons with a 44–14 record.

In 1984, he returned to UCLA as its men's basketball coach, twenty years after winning the national championship as a player. That same year, he was inducted into the UCLA Athletics Hall of Fame. He coached for four seasons, winning 77 out of 125 games. The 1984–85 UCLA Bruins basketball team won the NIT championship. The 1986–87 Bruins won both the Pac-10 regular season championship as well as the inaugural Pac-10 tournament.

Hazzard was involved in a recruiting issue with Sean Higgins, who was highly recruited while in Fairfax High School in Los Angeles. Higgins had narrowed his choices between Michigan and UCLA. His signing became controversial from the outset, when it had been reported that he had signed a letter of intent to go to UCLA on November 19, 1986. His father reported that he had been under duress. By February 1987, a Sports Illustrated report outlined the allegations, that his stepfather had coerced him to sign for UCLA. Furthermore, he had been offered enticements by a UCLA alumnus stockbroker, and could live in the chauffer's quarters where UCLA player Reggie Miller had lived. Hazzard was quoted, "(Higgins) doesn’t know what he’s doing. [He said] Sean is taking on some very powerful people." Higgins was released from his letter of intent to UCLA in March 1987. The NCAA conducted an investigation into the recruiting at UCLA. Higgins joined Rumeal Robinson and Terry Mills in coach Bill Frieder's 1987-88 season for Michigan. Ultimately, UCLA was penalized with two lost scholarships over the recruiting violation. Other improper actions by Hazzard were found during the NCAA investigation.

After the 1987–88 Bruins finished only two games above .500—the closest they had come to a losing record in 40 years—Hazzard was fired. He later spent a number of years working for the Los Angeles Lakers, first as an advance scout on the west coast and later as a special consultant.

== Career statistics ==
Legend
GP	Games played	GS	Games started	MPG	Minutes per game
FG%	Field goal percentage	3P%	3-point field goal percentage	FT%	Free throw percentage
RPG	Rebounds per game	APG	Assists per game	SPG	Steals per game
BPG	Blocks per game	PPG	Points per game	**Bold**	Career high

=== Playing statistics ===
==== Regular season ====
Year	Team	GP	GS	MPG	FG%	3P%	FT%	RPG	APG	SPG	BPG	PPG
1964–65	Los Angeles	66	–	13.9	.382	–	.648	1.7	2.1	–	–	4.2
1965–66	Los Angeles	80	–	27.5	.457	–	.708	2.7	4.9	–	–	13.7
1966–67	Los Angeles	79	–	20.8	.426	–	.729	2.9	4.1	–	–	9.3
1967–68	Seattle	79	–	33.7	.441	–	.774	**4.2**	6.2	–	–	**24.0**
1968–69	Atlanta	80	–	30.3	.397	–	.707	3.3	5.9	–	–	11.2
1969–70	Atlanta	**82**	–	33.6	**.467**	–	.809	4.0	**6.8**	–	–	15.3
1970–71	Atlanta	**82**	–	**35.1**	.459	–	.759	3.7	6.3	–	–	16.5
1971–72	Buffalo	72	–	33.2	.451	–	.782	3.0	5.6	–	–	15.8
1972–73	Buffalo	9	–	14.9	.417	–	.500	1.1	1.9	–	–	5.9
1972–73	Golden State	46	–	13.7	.418	–	**.863**	1.7	2.4	–	–	4.5
1973–74	Seattle	49	–	11.7	.422	–	.756	1.2	2.5	**.5**	**.1**	3.8
Career		724	–	26.5	.441	–	.757	3.0	4.9	.5	.1	12.6

==== Playoffs ====
Year	Team	GP	GS	MPG	FG%	3P%	FT%	RPG	APG	SPG	BPG	PPG
1965	Los Angeles	7	–	16.9	.333	–	.750	2.6	4.3	–	–	7.6
1966	Los Angeles	**14**	–	24.3	.493	–	.619	2.9	3.1	–	–	11.9
1967	Los Angeles	3	–	28.7	.240	–	.800	2.7	5.3	–	–	6.7
1969	Atlanta	11	–	32.7	.393	–	.787	3.0	3.9	–	–	14.0
1970	Atlanta	7	–	36.4	**.500**	–	.625	3.4	**7.7**	–	–	**21.4**
1971	Atlanta	5	–	**40.4**	.329	–	.800	**5.0**	5.4	–	–	14.0
1973	Golden State	11	–	19.5	.357	–	**1.000**	1.8	2.5	–	–	6.5
Career		58	–	27.2	.413	–	.738	2.9	4.2	–	–	11.8

=== Coaching statistics ===
Record table
Season	Team	Overall	Conference	Standing	Postseason
**UCLA Bruins** (Pacific-10 Conference) (1984–1988)
1984–85	UCLA	21–12	12–6	3rd	NIT champion
1985–86	UCLA	15–14	9–9	4th	NIT first round
1986–87	UCLA	25–7	14–4	1st	NCAA Division I second round
1987–88	UCLA	16–14	12–6	2nd	
UCLA:		77–47	47–25		
Total:		77–47			
National champion Postseason invitational champion Conference regular season champion Conference regular season and conference tournament champion Division regular season champion Division regular season and conference tournament champion Conference tournament champion

== Personal life and death ==
In the summer of 1972, Hazzard embraced Islam, and started going by the name "Mahdi Abdul-Rahman" in 1972–73, his eighth season in the NBA. In 1976–77, he returned to study at UCLA, completing his degree in kinesiology at age 35. By 1980 when he joined Compton, he changed his name to Abdul-Rahman Hazzard. One of the reasons he cited was the recognition of the name Hazzard. He felt that the name change was poorly received in basketball circles, believing that it cost him opportunities, both during and after his playing career. Although he remained a Muslim, he chose to return to using his original name professionally. In 1984, UCLA introduced him as Walt Hazzard when they hired him as their coach.

Hazzard and his wife Jaleesa had four children: Yakub, Jalal, Rasheed, and Khalil, the latter being a record producer, well known in hip hop circles by the stage name DJ Khalil. Hazzard's grandsons, Jacob and Max Hazzard, also play basketball. Jacob is a former walk-on basketball player at Arizona, and Max played basketball for UC Irvine and Arizona.

On March 22, 1996, Hazzard was hospitalized following a stroke. Although he made a substantial recovery over the ensuing years, his health never returned in full and subsequent to his illness he was much less active in the public sphere. Shortly after the stroke, Lakers owner Jerry Buss promised Hazzard's family that he would remain on the team's payroll as long as Buss owned the team; Hazzard remained a Lakers employee for the rest of his life. By the middle of 2011, his health had deteriorated significantly and he was hospitalized in intensive care. On November 18 of that year, Hazzard died at the age of 69 at the UCLA Ronald Reagan Medical Center due to complications following heart surgery.
