= 1965 NBA playoffs =

Postseason tournament

Tournament details
- Dates: March 24–April 15, 1965
- Season: 1964–65
- Teams: 6

Final positions
- Champions: Boston Celtics (8th title)
- Runner-up: Los Angeles Lakers
- Semifinalists: Baltimore Bullets; Philadelphia 76ers

The 1965 NBA playoffs was the postseason tournament of the National Basketball Association's 1964–65 season. The tournament concluded with the Eastern Division champion Boston Celtics defeating the Western Division champion Los Angeles Lakers 4 games to 1 in the NBA Finals.

Boston won its seventh consecutive NBA title and eighth overall while handing the Lakers their fourth straight Finals loss in the process.

This was the first playoff appearance for the Baltimore Bullets, who had begun play in the 1961–62 season as the Chicago Packers.

== Bracket ==
Division Semifinals
E3	Philadelphia	3
E2	Cincinnati	1
W3	Baltimore	3
W2	St. Louis	1

Division Finals
Eastern Division
E1	Boston*	4
E3	Philadelphia	3
Western Division
W1	Los Angeles*	4
W3	Baltimore	2

NBA Finals
E1	Boston*	4
W1	Los Angeles*	1

- * Division winner
- Bold Series winner
- Italic Team with home-court advantage in NBA Finals

== Division Semifinals ==
=== Eastern Division Semifinals ===
==== (2) Cincinnati Royals vs. (3) Philadelphia 76ers ====
March 24

Boxscore

Philadelphia 76ers 119, Cincinnati Royals 117 (OT)
Scoring by quarter: 27–36, 27–28, 30–24, 24–20, Overtime: 11–9
Pts: Hal Greer 37; Rebs: Wilt Chamberlain 23; Asts: Greer, Kerr 6 each	Pts: Jack Twyman 25; Rebs: Jerry Lucas 27; Asts: Oscar Robertson 13
Philadelphia leads series, 1–0

Cincinnati Gardens, Cincinnati, Ohio
Attendance: 6,422

March 26

Boxscore

Cincinnati Royals 121, Philadelphia 76ers 120
Scoring by quarter: 32–32, 28–33, 28–26, 33–29
Pts: Oscar Robertson 40; Rebs: Jerry Lucas 21; Asts: Oscar Robertson 13	Pts: Wilt Chamberlain 30; Rebs: Wilt Chamberlain 15; Asts: Wilt Chamberlain 10
Series tied, 1–1

Municipal Auditorium, Philadelphia, Pennsylvania
Attendance: 5,801

March 28

Boxscore

Philadelphia 76ers 108, Cincinnati Royals 94
Scoring by quarter: 35–28, 22–25, 22–21, 29–20
Pts: Hal Greer 30; Rebs: Wilt Chamberlain 15; Asts: Wilt Chamberlain 6	Pts: Oscar Robertson 27; Rebs: Jerry Lucas 17; Asts: Oscar Robertson 12
Philadelphia leads series, 2–1

Cincinnati Gardens, Cincinnati, Ohio
Attendance: 6,289

March 31

Boxscore

Cincinnati Royals 112, Philadelphia 76ers 119
Scoring by quarter: 18–28, 30–25, 24–36, 40–30
Pts: Jerry Lucas 35; Rebs: Jerry Lucas 19; Asts: Oscar Robertson 10	Pts: Wilt Chamberlain 38; Rebs: Wilt Chamberlain 26; Asts: Hal Greer 7
Philadelphia wins series, 3–1

Municipal Auditorium, Philadelphia, Pennsylvania
Attendance: 7,451

This was the third playoff meeting between these two teams, with the Royals winning the first two meetings.

Previous playoff series
Cincinnati leads 2–0 in all-time playoff series

1963

Syracuse Nationals 2, Cincinnati Royals 3

1963 Eastern Division Semifinals

1964

Philadelphia 76ers 2, Cincinnati Royals 3

1964 Eastern Division Semifinals

=== Western Division Semifinals ===
==== (2) St. Louis Hawks vs. (3) Baltimore Bullets ====
March 24

Boxscore

Baltimore Bullets 108, St. Louis Hawks 105
Scoring by quarter: 26–23, 24–22, 22–30, 36–30
Pts: Bailey Howell 25; Rebs: Walt Bellamy 20; Asts: three players 4 each	Pts: Lenny Wilkens 25; Rebs: Bill Bridges 23; Asts: Richie Guerin 6
Baltimore leads series, 1–0

Kiel Auditorium, St. Louis, Missouri
Attendance: 5,320

March 26

Boxscore

Baltimore Bullets 105, St. Louis Hawks 129
Scoring by quarter: 26–37, 19–28, 32–18, 28–46
Pts: Don Ohl 23; Rebs: Walt Bellamy 12; Asts: Gus Johnson 7	Pts: Richie Guerin 28; Rebs: Zelmo Beaty 12; Asts: Richie Guerin 10
Series tied, 1–1

Kiel Auditorium, St. Louis, Missouri
Attendance: 7,628

March 27

Boxscore

St. Louis Hawks 99, Baltimore Bullets 131
Scoring by quarter: 23–26, 26–28, 24–36, 26–41
Pts: Zelmo Beaty 18; Rebs: Zelmo Beaty 17; Asts: four players 3 each	Pts: Bellamy, Ohl 23 each Rebs: Walt Bellamy 18; Asts: Johnson, Green 3 each
Baltimore leads series, 2–1

Baltimore Civic Center, Baltimore, Maryland
Attendance: 6,358

March 30

Boxscore

St. Louis Hawks 103, Baltimore Bullets 109
Scoring by quarter: 30–25, 24–26, 27–29, 22–29
Pts: Cliff Hagan 24; Rebs: Bill Bridges 20; Asts: Lenny Wilkens 4	Pts: Kevin Loughery 31; Rebs: Walt Bellamy 10; Asts: Kevin Loughery 6
Baltimore wins series, 3–1

Baltimore Civic Center, Baltimore, Maryland
Attendance: 6,423

- Bob Pettit's last NBA game.

This was the first playoff meeting between these two teams.

== Division Finals ==
=== Eastern Division Finals ===
==== (1) Boston Celtics vs. (3) Philadelphia 76ers ====
April 4

Boxscore

Philadelphia 76ers 98, Boston Celtics 108
Scoring by quarter: 23–26, 20–27, 21–24, 34–31
Pts: Wilt Chamberlain 33; Rebs: Wilt Chamberlain 31; Asts: three players 3 each	Pts: Tom Heinsohn 23; Rebs: Bill Russell 32; Asts: Bill Russell 6
Boston leads series, 1–0

Boston Garden, Boston, Massachusetts
Attendance: 13,909

April 6

Boxscore

Boston Celtics 103, Philadelphia 76ers 109
Scoring by quarter: 29–28, 19–25, 25–31, 30–25
Pts: Sam Jones 40; Rebs: Bill Russell 16; Asts: Bill Russell 5	Pts: Wilt Chamberlain 30; Rebs: Wilt Chamberlain 39; Asts: Wilt Chamberlain 8
Series tied, 1–1

Municipal Auditorium, Philadelphia, Pennsylvania
Attendance: 9,790

April 8

Boxscore

Philadelphia 76ers 94, Boston Celtics 112
Scoring by quarter: 27–34, 20–27, 18–17, 29–34
Pts: Wilt Chamberlain 24; Rebs: Wilt Chamberlain 37; Asts: Hal Greer 4	Pts: S. Jones, Havlicek 24 each Rebs: Bill Russell 26; Asts: Bill Russell 8
Boston leads series, 2–1

Boston Garden, Boston, Massachusetts
Attendance: 13,909

April 9

Boxscore

Boston Celtics 131, Philadelphia 76ers 134 (OT)
Scoring by quarter: 21–32, 35–19, 29–40, 33–27, Overtime: 13–16
Pts: Sam Jones 36; Rebs: Bill Russell 25; Asts: K. C. Jones 10	Pts: Wilt Chamberlain 34; Rebs: Wilt Chamberlain 34; Asts: Costello, Kerr 5 each
Series tied, 2–2

Municipal Auditorium, Philadelphia, Pennsylvania
Attendance: 9,294

April 11

Boxscore

Philadelphia 76ers 108, Boston Celtics 114
Scoring by quarter: 28–34, 25–30, 22–26, 33–24
Pts: Wilt Chamberlain 30; Rebs: Wilt Chamberlain 21; Asts: Hal Greer 4	Pts: Sam Jones 29; Rebs: Bill Russell 28; Asts: K. C. Jones 9
Boston leads series, 3–2

Boston Garden, Boston, Massachusetts
Attendance: 13,909

April 13

Boxscore

Boston Celtics 106, Philadelphia 76ers 112
Scoring by quarter: 27–39, 23–26, 31–25, 25–22
Pts: Tom Sanders 25; Rebs: Bill Russell 21; Asts: Russell, K. C. Jones 5 each	Pts: Wilt Chamberlain 30; Rebs: Wilt Chamberlain 26; Asts: Larry Costello 6
Series tied, 3–3

Municipal Auditorium, Philadelphia, Pennsylvania
Attendance: 11,182

April 15

Boxscore

Philadelphia 76ers 109, Boston Celtics 110
Scoring by quarter: 26–35, 36–26, 20–29, 27–20
Pts: Wilt Chamberlain 30; Rebs: Wilt Chamberlain 32; Asts: Hal Greer 9	Pts: Sam Jones 37; Rebs: Bill Russell 8 Asts: K. C. Jones 10
Boston wins series, 4–3

Boston Garden, Boston, Massachusetts
Attendance: 13,909

- John Havlicek steals the inbounds pass by Hal Greer.

This was the ninth playoff meeting between these two teams, with both teams splitting the first eight meetings when the 76ers were the Syracuse Nationals.

Previous playoff series
Tied 4–4 in all-time playoff series

1953

Boston Celtics 2, Syracuse Nationals 0

1953 Eastern Division Semifinals

1954

Boston Celtics 0, Syracuse Nationals 2

1954 Eastern Division Round Robin Semifinals

1954

Boston Celtics 0, Syracuse Nationals 2

1954 Eastern Division Finals

1955

Boston Celtics 1, Syracuse Nationals 3

1955 Eastern Division Finals

1956

Boston Celtics 1, Syracuse Nationals 2

1956 Eastern Division Semifinals

1957

Boston Celtics 3, Syracuse Nationals 0

1957 Eastern Division Finals

1959

Boston Celtics 4, Syracuse Nationals 3

1959 Eastern Division Finals

1961

Boston Celtics 4, Syracuse Nationals 1

1961 Eastern Division Finals

=== Western Division Finals ===
==== (1) Los Angeles Lakers vs. (3) Baltimore Bullets ====
April 3

Boxscore

Baltimore Bullets 115, Los Angeles Lakers 121
Scoring by quarter: 28–29, 23–39, 26–24, 38–29
Pts: Don Ohl 29; Rebs: Bailey Howell 20; Asts: Walt Bellamy 5	Pts: Jerry West 49; Rebs: LeRoy Ellis 15; Asts: Jerry West 8
Los Angeles leads series, 1–0

Los Angeles Memorial Sports Arena, Los Angeles, California
Attendance: 14,579

April 5

Boxscore

Baltimore Bullets 115, Los Angeles Lakers 118
Scoring by quarter: 29–36, 24–24, 30–30, 32–28
Pts: Don Ohl 30; Rebs: Walt Bellamy 20; Asts: Johnson, Bellamy 5 each	Pts: Jerry West 52; Rebs: Gene Wiley 12; Asts: Jerry West 9
Los Angeles leads series, 2–0

Los Angeles Memorial Sports Arena, Los Angeles, California
Attendance: 10,594

April 7

Boxscore

Los Angeles Lakers 115, Baltimore Bullets 122
Scoring by quarter: 28–24, 28–39, 25–25, 34–34
Pts: Jerry West 44; Rebs: Gene Wiley 13; Asts: Jerry West 4	Pts: Bailey Howell 29; Rebs: Bailey Howell 17; Asts: Johnson, Loughery 4 each
Los Angeles leads series, 2–1

Baltimore Civic Center, Baltimore, Maryland
Attendance: 7,247

April 9

Boxscore

Los Angeles Lakers 112, Baltimore Bullets 114
Scoring by quarter: 26–24, 35–36, 25–22, 26–32
Pts: Jerry West 48; Rebs: Rudy LaRusso 14; Asts: Jerry West 5	Pts: Don Ohl 28; Rebs: Walt Bellamy 16; Asts: four players 3 each
Series tied, 2–2

Baltimore Civic Center, Baltimore, Maryland
Attendance: 10,642

April 11

Boxscore

Baltimore Bullets 112, Los Angeles Lakers 120
Scoring by quarter: 29–27, 23–26, 25–33, 35–34
Pts: Walt Bellamy 29; Rebs: Gus Johnson 16; Asts: Bellamy, Howell 5 each	Pts: Jerry West 43; Rebs: LeRoy Ellis 18; Asts: Jerry West 7
Los Angeles leads series, 3–2

Los Angeles Memorial Sports Arena, Los Angeles, California
Attendance: 15,013

April 13

Boxscore

Los Angeles Lakers 117, Baltimore Bullets 115
Scoring by quarter: 20–30, 32–18, 35–33, 30–34
Pts: Jerry West 42; Rebs: LeRoy Ellis 10; Asts: Jerry West 8	Pts: Don Ohl 34; Rebs: Walt Bellamy 15; Asts: Walt Bellamy 5
Los Angeles wins series, 4–2

Baltimore Civic Center, Baltimore, Maryland
Attendance: 8,590

This was the first playoff meeting between these two teams.

== NBA Finals: (E1) Boston Celtics vs. (W1) Los Angeles Lakers ==
April 18

Boxscore

Los Angeles Lakers 110, Boston Celtics 142
Scoring by quarter: 23–32, 26–32, 34–39, 27–39
Pts: Jerry West 26; Rebs: Gene Wiley 14; Asts: Walt Hazzard 5	Pts: Sam Jones 25; Rebs: Bill Russell 28; Asts: K. C. Jones 8
Boston leads series, 1–0

Boston Garden, Boston, Massachusetts
Attendance: 10,180

April 19

Boxscore

Los Angeles Lakers 123, Boston Celtics 129
Scoring by quarter: 29–35, 31–27, 29–39, 34–28
Pts: Jerry West 45; Rebs: Gene Wiley 15; Asts: Jerry West 5	Pts: John Havlicek 24; Rebs: Bill Russell 25; Asts: Bill Russell 10
Boston leads series, 2–0

Boston Garden, Boston, Massachusetts
Attendance: 13,909

April 21

Boxscore

Boston Celtics 105, Los Angeles Lakers 126
Scoring by quarter: 17–35, 31–33, 26–24, 31–34
Pts: Sam Jones 35; Rebs: Bill Russell 19; Asts: Larry Siegfried 5	Pts: Jerry West 43; Rebs: Gene Wiley 28; Asts: Jerry West 7
Boston leads series, 2–1

Los Angeles Memorial Sports Arena, Los Angeles, California
Attendance: 14,243

April 23

Boxscore

Boston Celtics 112, Los Angeles Lakers 99
Scoring by quarter: 32–24, 23–37, 33–21, 24–17
Pts: Sam Jones 37; Rebs: Bill Russell 23; Asts: Russell, K. C. Jones 5 each	Pts: LeRoy Ellis 24; Rebs: Gene Wiley 19; Asts: Wiley, Hazzard 5 each
Boston leads series, 3–1

Los Angeles Memorial Sports Arena, Los Angeles, California
Attendance: 15,217

April 25

Boxscore

Los Angeles Lakers 96, Boston Celtics 129
Scoring by quarter: 26–33, 22–24, 23–30, 25–42
Pts: Jerry West 33; Rebs: Gene Wiley 13; Asts: Walt Hazzard 10	Pts: S. Jones, Russell 22 each Rebs: Bill Russell 30; Asts: K. C. Jones 9
Boston wins series, 4–1

Boston Garden, Boston, Massachusetts
Attendance: 13,909

- Tom Heinsohn's final NBA game.

This was the fourth playoff meeting between these two teams, with the Celtics winning the first three meetings.

Previous playoff series
Boston leads 3–0 in all-time playoff series

1959

Boston Celtics 4, Minneapolis Lakers 0

1959 NBA Finals

1962

Boston Celtics 4, Los Angeles Lakers 3

1962 NBA Finals

1963

Boston Celtics 4, Los Angeles Lakers 2

1963 NBA Finals

== See also ==
- 1965 NBA Finals
- 1964–65 NBA season
