= Bailey Howell =

American basketball player (born 1937)

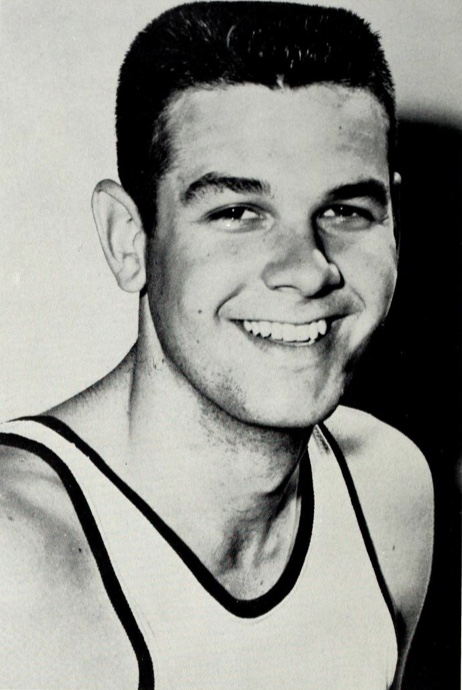
- Howell as a senior at MSU

Personal information
- Born: January 20, 1937 (age 89) Middleton, Tennessee, U.S.
- Listed height: 6 ft 7 in (2.01 m)
- Listed weight: 210 lb (95 kg)

Career information
- High school: Middleton (Middleton, Tennessee)
- College: Mississippi State (1956–1959)
- NBA draft: 1959: 1st round, 2nd overall pick
- Drafted by: Detroit Pistons
- Playing career: 1959–1971
- Position: Small forward / power forward
- Number: 52, 18, 15, 16

Career history
- 1959–1964: Detroit Pistons
- 1964–1966: Baltimore Bullets
- 1966–1970: Boston Celtics
- 1970–1971: Philadelphia 76ers

Career highlights
- 2× NBA champion (1968, 1969); 6× NBA All-Star (1961–1964, 1966, 1967); All-NBA Second Team (1963); Consensus first-team All-American (1959); Consensus second-team All-American (1958); 3× First-team All-SEC (1957, 1958, 1959); No. 52 retired by Mississippi State Bulldogs

Career statistics
- Points: 17,770 (18.7 ppg)
- Rebounds: 9,383 (9.9 rpg)
- Assists: 1,853 (1.9 apg)
- Stats at NBA.com
- Stats at Basketball Reference
- Basketball Hall of Fame
- Collegiate Basketball Hall of Fame

Bailey E. Howell (born January 20, 1937) is an American former professional basketball player. After playing college basketball at Mississippi State, Howell played 12 seasons in the National Basketball Association (NBA). A six-time NBA All-Star and two-time NBA champion, Howell was inducted into the Naismith Memorial Basketball Hall of Fame in 1997. Known as "Buckshot" because of his lethal ability to score in the paint area, he thrived on second-effort plays close to the basket.

== Early life ==
Bailey Howell was born in Middleton, Tennessee, on January 20, 1937, to Walter and Martha Howell. His father was a mail carrier and his mother was a teacher. He had two siblings.

Playing for Middleton High School from 1953 to 1955, Howell scored 1,187 career points, the Tennessee high school record at the time. He was selected all–conference each season, All–State his junior and senior seasons and All–American his senior year of 1955. He averaged 31.2 points per game as a senior.

Howell was recruited by major schools Memphis State, Mississippi, Tennessee, Vanderbilt, and Kentucky, among others. Kentucky Coach Adolph Rupp never made the trip to see Howell play. Ultimately Howell chose to play for Coach Babe McCarthy and the Mississippi State Bulldogs men's basketball program of the Southeastern Conference (SEC).

== College career ==
Howell was a 6'7" forward, playing at Mississippi State University from 1955 to 1959.

In 1956–1957 Howell made his varsity debut, as freshman were prohibited from playing varsity. Playing for Coach McCarthy, Howell made an immediate impact as a sophomore, averaging 25.9 points and 19.7 rebounds, as Mississippi State finished 17–8, placing 3rd in the SEC.

The 1957–1958 season saw Mississippi State improve to 20–5, placing 3rd in the SEC and being ranked 15th in the final polls. Howell averaged 27.8 points and 16.2 rebounds, winning the first of consecutive SEC Most Valuable Player awards.

In his senior season of 1958–1959, Mississippi State finished 24–1 and won the SEC Conference Championship with a 13–1 record. Howell averaged 27.5 points and 15.2 rebounds, winning his second SEC Most Valuable Player award.

In 1959, Howell was named AP First Team All–American. Howell was named to the team along with Bob Boozer of Kansas State, Johnny Cox of Kentucky, Oscar Robertson of Cincinnati, and Jerry West of West Virginia. Howell, Boozer, Robertson, and West have been inducted into the Naismith Basketball Hall of Fame.

Mississippi State University forfeited its NCAA tournament bids during Howell's tenure. The university declined to play in the tournament due to the state of Mississippi's then unwritten practice of not playing against integrated basketball teams. “It was the biggest disappointment of my basketball career,” Howell said of the Mississippi State University's decision. “I was never so disappointed. In America, no matter what you do, you have the opportunity to go as far as you can go and be whatever you can be. We were denied that opportunity.”

Overall, during his three varsity seasons, Howell led the Bulldogs to a 64–14 record. His career averages of 27.1 points and 17.0 rebounds per game are both still school records. Howell concluded his career as Mississippi State's leading scorer (2,030 points) and leading rebounder (1,277 rebounds). His 47 points against Union in 1958 and 34 rebounds against Louisiana State University in 1957 remain single-game MSU records.

Despite playing at the college level for only three years, he set and still holds Mississippi State records for single-game points scored, career scoring average, single–season and career free throws made, single-season and career free throws attempted, single–game free throw percentage, single-game rebounds, single–season rebounds, career rebounds, and single-season and career rebounding average. His scoring records are particularly impressive, since there was no three-point line or shot clock in the era that he was a player. He is considered a legend to the Bulldog basketball faithful, and one of the best-known players to have played at MSU. He is probably most known for his hook shot, rebounding ability, and work ethic as a player and person.

== NBA career ==
=== Detroit Pistons (1959–1964) ===
Howell was the No. 2 pick of the 1959 NBA draft by the Detroit Pistons. He was selected behind territorial pick Wilt Chamberlain and Bob Boozer, both future Hall–of–Famers.

Howell made an immediate impact, averaging 17.8 points and 10.5 rebounds as a rookie in 1959–60, as the Pistons finished 30–45.

In his first season, Howell became friends with Piston teammate Earl Lloyd, who earlier in his career had become the first African-American to play in an NBA game. "Earl took me under his wing and spent a great deal of time teaching me about the pro game." Howell said years later. "He was truly my mentor. We continued our friendship after our playing days were over, keeping in touch and visiting occasionally. My wife and I were at his Hall of Fame enshrinement ceremony."

In his second season, Howell improved to 23.6 points and 14.4 rebounds in 1960–61 as Detroit finished 34–45 under head coach Dick McGuire. Howell was named to his first of four consecutive NBA All-Star Teams. On November 25, 1960, Howell had career highs of 43 points and 32 rebounds in a game against the Los Angeles Lakers. The Pistons lost 3–2 in the playoffs to the Los Angeles Lakers as Howell averaged 11.2 points in the series.

The Pistons improved to 37–43 in 1961–62, with Howell leading the team averaging a double-double of 19.9 points and 12.6 rebounds, along with 2.4 assists. The Pistons defeated the Cincinnati Royals 3–1 in the playoffs, behind 22.0 points from Howell. The Pistons were then defeated by the Lakers for the third consecutive year in the Western Conference Final 4–2, as Howell averaged 18.7 points in the series.

In 1962–63 Howell averaged a double-double of 22.7 points and 11.5 rebounds. The Pistons finished 34–46, losing to Bob Pettit and the St. Louis Hawks 3–1 in the playoffs, with Howell averaging 17.8 and 10.5 in the series.

The Pistons replaced Dick McGuire with Charles Wolf as head coach in 1963–64 and the team finished 23–57. Howell again was an All-Star and averaged a double-double of 21.6 points and 10.1 rebounds.

=== Baltimore Bullets (1964–1966) ===
On June 18, 1964, Howell's Detroit tenure ended. He was traded by the Pistons with Bob Ferry, Les Hunter, Wali Jones and Don Ohl to the Baltimore Bullets for Terry Dischinger, Don Kojis and Rod Thorn.

With Baltimore in 1964–65, Howell led the league in personal fouls (345) and averaged 19.2 and 10.5 rebounds, playing alongside Walt Bellamy. The Bullets finished 37–43 under head coach Buddy Jeannette. The Bullets won their first round series 3–1 over the St. Louis Hawks, before losing 4–2 to the Los Angeles Lakers in the Western Conference Finals, despite 21.8 points and 13.4 rebounds from Howell. Jerry West averaged 46.3 points and 6.8 assists for the Lakers in the series.

Under head coach Paul Seymour (Jeannette moved to become the GM), the Bullets finished 38–42, and Howell averaged 17.5 points and 9.9 rebounds. The team was swept by the St. Louis Hawks in the playoffs.

=== Boston Celtics (1966–1970) ===
Howell's career took a landmark turn on September 1, 1966, when he was traded by the Baltimore Bullets to the Boston Celtics for Mel Counts in a trade engineered by the Celtics' Red Auerbach. In Boston, Howell joined a roster loaded with future Hall of Famers: player-coach Bill Russell, John Havlicek, Don Nelson, K.C. Jones, Satch Sanders, Wayne Embry and Sam Jones. Howell blended in quite well, averaging 20.0 points and 8.4 rebounds for the 60–21 Celtics. Undoubtedly Russell's rebounding skills kept a few from Howell, as Russell averaged 21.0 rebounds per game. The Celtics defeated the New York Knicks 3–1 in the playoffs, before losing 4–1 to Wilt Chamberlain and the eventual NBA Champion Philadelphia 76ers in the Eastern Conference Finals. Chamberlain averaged a triple-double of 32.0 points, 21.6 rebounds and 10.0 assists in the series. Howell averaged 17.2 points and 6.8 rebounds.

Howell earned an NBA Championship ring in 1967–68. The Celtics won the NBA Title, defeating the Los Angeles Lakers 4–2 in the NBA Finals. Howell averaged 19.8 points and 9.8 rebounds in the regular season as the 54–28 Celtics earned Russell his first title as head coach. The Celtics beat the Pistons 4–2 in the playoffs, with Howell third on the team with 17.7 points in the series.

In a rematch against Chamberlain and the 76ers in the 1968 Eastern Conference Finals, the Celtics prevailed 4–3 with a 100–96 game seven win, with 17 points and 10 rebounds from Howell.

In the 1968 NBA Finals against the Lakers with Elgin Baylor and Jerry West, Howell averaged 21.0 points and 7.5 rebounds in the 4–2 series victory for the Celtics.

The Celtics defended their NBA Title in 1968–69, earning Howell a second NBA Championship ring. The Celtics finished 48–34 in the regular season as the 32-year-old Howell averaged 19.7 points an 8.8 rebounds on the season, second on the team in scoring to Havlicek and second in rebounding to Russell.

In the 1969 playoffs, the Celtics beat the 76ers 4–1 and the Knicks 4–2 in the Eastern Conference Finals, to set up a rematch with the Lakers in the NBA Finals. Baylor and West now had Chamberlain alongside them as a teammate.

In the 1969 NBA Finals, the Celtics won in seven classic games. Game seven was a 108–106 Celtic win in Los Angeles. Howell averaged 10.6 points and 5.3 rebounds in the series.

Bill Russell retired after the 1969 title, with Tommy Heinsohn taking over as head coach of the Celtics in 1969–70. With an aging lineup and without Russell the Celtics slipped to 34–48, missing the playoffs. Howell averaged 12.6 points and 6.7 rebounds at age 33.

=== Philadelphia 76ers (1970–1971) ===
After the season, on May 11, 1970, Howell was drafted by the Buffalo Braves from the Celtics in the NBA expansion draft. He was immediately traded by the Braves to the Philadelphia 76ers for Bob Kauffman and a future 1971 2nd round draft pick (Spencer Haywood).

At age 34, Howell played one final NBA season with the 76ers in a slightly reduced role, averaging 10.7 points and 5.4 rebounds for the 47–35 76ers under head coach Jack Ramsay. The 76ers were defeated by the Bullets in the playoffs with Howell averaging 6.7 points and 4.4 rebounds in the series.

=== Career legacy ===
Overall, Howell played 12 seasons (1959–1971) in the National Basketball Association (NBA) as a member of the Detroit Pistons (1959–1964), Baltimore Bullets (1964–1966), Boston Celtics (1966–1970), and Philadelphia 76ers (1970–1971). A six-time All-Star with 17,770 career points (18.7) and 9383 rebounds (9.9), he was elected to the Naismith Memorial Basketball Hall of Fame in 1997. He won two NBA championships with the Boston Celtics. The best years of his career were during his time with the Celtics and the Pistons.

At the time of his retirement from the NBA in 1971, Howell ranked among the NBA's top 10 leaders in nine statistical categories.

Hall of Fame announcer Dick Vitale called Howell the greatest offensive rebounder in history.

== Personal life ==
Howell married Mary Lou Flowers in 1964. They have lived in Starkville, Mississippi for many years.

After his career ended in 1971, Howell returned to Mississippi State earning his master's degree in physical education while assisting the men's basketball team. Howell went to work with the Converse shoe company most notably working with developing the Converse All-Star. He is very active in Mississippi State athletics fund-raising, specifically the Bulldog Club which raises funds to pay for MSU athletic scholarships.

Howell has served as an elder for the Starkville Church of Christ for many years.

Howell is the father of Mississippi Board of Realtors CEO Beth Hansen and father-in-law of current University of Florida athletic director, Scott Stricklin, a Mississippi State graduate who was athletic director at his alma mater before taking the same position at Florida. Stricklin is married to the former Anne Howell, the youngest daughter of Bailey Howell. Anne Howell was a three-time All-Lone Star Conference team member and played tennis for Abilene Christian. Bailey and Mary Lou Howell have three daughters. Their oldest daughter, Amy Howell Allen, and her husband, Stan, live in Paducah, Kentucky.

== Honors and awards ==
- The Middleton High School gymnasium (TN) bears his name, dedicated in 1970.
- In 1971, Howell was inducted into the Mississippi State University Sports Hall of Fame.
- Howell was inducted into the Mississippi Sports Hall of Fame and Museum in 1977.
- In 1981, Howell was inducted into the Tennessee Sports Hall of Fame.
- In 1997, Howell was inducted into the Naismith Basketball Hall of Fame.
- "The Howell Trophy" began in 2005, and is awarded annually to best male collegiate basketball player in the state of Mississippi. The bronze statue was designed by J. Kim Sessums.
- Howell was inducted into the College Basketball Hall of Fame in 2006.
- Howell's jersey (#52) was the first retired by Mississippi State University. On February 7, 2009, the ceremony took place at halftime of the MSU game against the University of Arkansas. The #52 banner hangs inside Humphrey Coliseum.
- Mississippi State renamed Coliseum Drive through campus as "Bailey Howell Drive" in 2014.

== NBA career statistics ==
Legend
GP	Games played	GS	Games started	MPG	Minutes per game
FG%	Field goal percentage	3P%	3-point field goal percentage	FT%	Free throw percentage
RPG	Rebounds per game	APG	Assists per game	SPG	Steals per game
BPG	Blocks per game	PPG	Points per game	**Bold**	Career high
†	Won an NBA championship

=== Regular season ===
Year	Team	GP	MPG	FG%	FT%	RPG	APG	PPG
1959–60	Detroit	75	31.3	.456	.739	10.5	0.8	17.8
1960–61	Detroit	77	**38.3**	.469	.753	**14.4**	2.5	**23.6**
1961–62	Detroit	79	36.2	.464	.768	12.6	2.4	19.9
1962–63	Detroit	79	37.6	**.516**	.798	11.5	**2.9**	22.7
1963–64	Detroit	77	35.1	.472	**.809**	10.1	2.7	21.6
1964–65	Baltimore	80	37.2	.495	.801	10.9	2.6	19.5
1965–66	Baltimore	78	29.8	.488	.730	9.9	2.0	17.5
1966–67	Boston	81	30.9	.512	.741	8.4	1.3	20.0
1967–68†	Boston	**82**	34.2	.481	.727	9.8	1.6	19.8
1968–69†	Boston	78	32.4	.487	.735	8.8	1.8	19.7
1969–70	Boston	**82**	25.3	.429	.763	6.7	1.5	12.6
1970–71	Philadelphia	**82**	19.4	.472	.730	5.4	1.4	10.7
Career		950	32.2	.480	.762	9.9	2.0	18.7
All-Star		6	13.5	.394	.750	1.7	1.3	5.3

=== Playoffs ===
Year	Team	GP	MPG	FG%	FT%	RPG	APG	PPG
1960	Detroit	2	36.0	.341	.750	8.5	1.5	17.0
1961	Detroit	5	30.8	.351	.696	9.2	**4.4**	11.2
1962	Detroit	10	37.8	.423	.827	9.6	2.3	20.0
1963	Detroit	4	**40.8**	.375	**.852**	10.5	2.8	17.8
1965	Baltimore	9	38.9	**.515**	.757	**11.7**	2.1	**20.8**
1966	Baltimore	3	31.3	.460	.727	10.0	0.7	18.0
1967	Boston	9	26.8	.484	.667	7.3	0.6	15.3
1968†	Boston	**19**	31.4	.511	.692	7.7	1.2	18.1
1969†	Boston	18	30.6	.489	.719	6.6	1.1	15.0
1971	Philadelphia	7	17.4	.422	.500	4.4	0.6	6.7
Career		86	31.7	.465	.732	8.1	1.5	16.3

== See also ==
- List of NBA career personal fouls leaders
- List of NBA career free throw scoring leaders
- List of NCAA Division I men's basketball players with 30 or more rebounds in a game
- List of NCAA Division I men's basketball players with 2000 points and 1000 rebounds
