= Gene Wiley =

American basketball player (1937–2026)

Personal information
- Born: November 12, 1937
- Died: June 21, 2026 (aged 88) El Dorado, Kansas, U.S.
- Listed height: 6 ft 10 in (2.08 m)
- Listed weight: 210 lb (95 kg)

Career information
- High school: Carver (Amarillo, Texas)
- College: Wichita State (1959–1962)
- NBA draft: 1962: 2nd round, 15th overall pick
- Drafted by: Los Angeles Lakers
- Playing career: 1962–1967
- Position: Center
- Number: 12, 30

Career history
- 1962–1966: Los Angeles Lakers
- 1967: Oakland Oaks
- 1967: Dallas Chaparrals

Career highlights
- First-team All-MVC (1962)
- Stats at NBA.com
- Stats at Basketball Reference

Gene Wiley (November 12, 1937 – June 21, 2026) was an American National Basketball Association (NBA) player for the Los Angeles Lakers. He attended Carver High School in Amarillo, Texas and Wichita State University. He was drafted in 1962 with the eighth pick in the second round by the Los Angeles Lakers.

== Playing career ==
Wiley played for the Denver-Chicago Truckers of the AAU National Industrial Basketball League in 1961–62.

He played four seasons in the NBA, with the Lakers. He averaged 4.2 points per game and 7.2 rebounds per game. In 1967, Wiley returned to professional basketball to play in the American Basketball Association (ABA). In one ABA season, he played for the Oakland Oaks and the Dallas Chaparrals. His ABA statistics were 2.0 points per game and 2.2 rebounds per game.

== Death ==
Wiley died in El Dorado, Kansas on June 21, 2026, at the age of 88.

== Career statistics ==
Legend
| GP | Games played | GS | Games started | MPG | Minutes per game |
| FG% | Field goal percentage | 3P% | 3-point field goal percentage | FT% | Free throw percentage |
| RPG | Rebounds per game | APG | Assists per game | SPG | Steals per game |
| BPG | Blocks per game | PPG | Points per game | **Bold** | Career high |
| * | Led the league |

=== NBA/ABA ===
==== Regular season ====
| Year | Team | GP | MPG | FG% | 3P% | FT% | RPG | APG | PPG |
|---|---|---|---|---|---|---|---|---|---|
| 1962–63 | L.A. Lakers | 75 | 19.8 | .462 | | .338 | 6.7 | .5 | 3.2 |
| 1963–64 | L.A. Lakers | 78 | 19.4 | **.535** | | **.600** | 6.5 | .6 | 4.3 |
| 1964–65 | L.A. Lakers | **80*** | **25.0** | .465 | | .505 | **8.6** | **1.3** | **5.1** |
| 1965–66 | L.A. Lakers | 67 | 20.7 | .426 | | .566 | 7.3 | .9 | 4.3 |
| 1967–68 | Oakland (ABA) | 8 | 8.0 | .368 | – | **.600** | 2.1 | .3 | 2.1 |
| 1967–68 | Dallas (ABA) | 1 | 21.0 | .000 | – | .333 | 3.0 | .0 | 1.0 |
| Career (NBA) | | 300 | 21.3 | .471 | | .506 | 7.3 | .8 | 4.2 |
| Career (ABA) | | 9 | 9.4 | .350 | – | .500 | 2.2 | .2 | 2.0 |
| Career (overall) | | 309 | 20.9 | .469 | – | .506 | 7.2 | .8 | 4.2 |

==== Playoffs ====
| Year | Team | GP | MPG | FG% | FT% | RPG | APG | PPG |
|---|---|---|---|---|---|---|---|---|
| 1963 | L.A. Lakers | 9 | 30.9 | .400 | .133 | 10.8 | 1.2 | 3.3 |
| 1964 | L.A. Lakers | 5 | 9.6 | **.625** | **1.000** | 3.2 | .0 | 2.6 |
| 1965 | L.A. Lakers | **11** | **34.5** | .559 | .579 | **14.4** | **2.1** | **7.0** |
| 1966 | L.A. Lakers | 2 | 2.5 | .000 | – | .5 | .0 | .0 |
| Career | | 27 | 26.3 | .505 | .432 | 10.1 | 1.3 | 4.4 |
