= 1964–65 Baltimore Bullets season =

NBA professional basketball team season

- Head coach: Buddy Jeannette
- General manager: Paul Hoffman
- Owner: Abe Pollin
- Arena: Baltimore Civic Center

Results
- Record: 37–43 (.463)
- Place: Division: 3rd (Western)
- Playoff finish: Division finals (lost to Lakers 2–4)
- Stats at Basketball Reference

Local media
- Television: WJZ-TV (Bill Gardner)
- Radio: WFBR (Jim Karvellas and Vince Bagli)

The 1964–65 Baltimore Bullets season was the Bullets' 4th season in the NBA and 2nd season in the city of Baltimore.

== Roster ==
1964–65 Baltimore Bullets roster
Players

Pos.	No.	Player	Height	Weight	DOB	From
C	8	Walt Bellamy	6 ft 11 in (2.11 m)	225 lb (102 kg)	1939-07-24	Indiana
SF	33	Gary Bradds	6 ft 8 in (2.03 m)	210 lb (95 kg)	1942-07-26	Ohio State
PG	20	Al Butler	6 ft 2 in (1.88 m)	175 lb (79 kg)	1938-07-09	Niagara
PF	12	Bob Ferry	6 ft 8 in (2.03 m)	230 lb (104 kg)	1937-05-31	Saint Louis
PG	11, 21	Si Green	6 ft 2 in (1.88 m)	185 lb (84 kg)	1933-08-20	Duquesne
PF	23	Charles Hardnett	6 ft 8 in (2.03 m)	225 lb (102 kg)	1938-09-13	Grambling State
PF	20	Wayne Hightower	6 ft 8 in (2.03 m)	192 lb (87 kg)	1940-01-14	Kansas
PF	15	Bailey Howell	6 ft 7 in (2.01 m)	210 lb (95 kg)	1937-01-20	Mississippi State
PF	41n	Les Hunter	6 ft 7 in (2.01 m)	210 lb (95 kg)	1942-08-16	Loyola Chicago
PF	25	Gus Johnson	6 ft 6 in (1.98 m)	230 lb (104 kg)	1938-12-13	Idaho
SG	24	Wali Jones	6 ft 2 in (1.88 m)	180 lb (82 kg)	1942-02-14	Villanova
SG	22	Kevin Loughery	6 ft 3 in (1.91 m)	190 lb (86 kg)	1940-03-28	St. John's
SG	10	Don Ohl	6 ft 3 in (1.91 m)	190 lb (86 kg)	1936-04-18	Illinois

Coaches
Head coach
- Buddy Jeannette

Legend
- (DP) Unsigned draft pick
- (FA) Free agent
- (S) Suspended
- Injured

Roster
Updated: February 3, 1965

== Regular season ==
=== Season standings ===
Western Division	W	L	PCT	GB	Home	Road	Neutral	Div
x-Los Angeles Lakers	49	31	.613	–	25–13	21–16	3–2	25–15
x-St. Louis Hawks	45	35	.563	4	26–4	15–17	4–4	28–12
x-Baltimore Bullets	37	43	.463	12	23–14	12–19	2–10	22–18
Detroit Pistons	31	49	.388	18	13–17	11–20	7–12	18–22
San Francisco Warriors	17	63	.213	32	10–26	5–31	2–6	7–33

- x – clinched playoff spot

=== Game log ===
1964–65 game log
#	Date	Opponent	Score	High points	Record
1	October 17	San Francisco	101–121	Walt Bellamy (30)	1–0
2	October 21	Los Angeles	108–105	Bailey Howell (29)	1–1
3	October 22	@ Philadelphia	138–135 (OT)	Johnson, Ohl (37)	2–1
4	October 24	@ Boston	103–131	Gus Johnson (23)	2–2
5	October 25	Boston	112–100	Bailey Howell (22)	2–3
6	October 27	@ San Francisco	90–101	Howell, Ohl (21)	2–4
7	October 28	@ Los Angeles	102–112	Walt Bellamy (24)	2–5
8	October 29	@ Los Angeles	98–95	Gus Johnson (28)	3–5
9	October 31	@ San Francisco	102–98	Bailey Howell (30)	4–5
10	November 4	@ Detroit	121–108	Bailey Howell (30)	5–5
11	November 6	@ Cincinnati	111–106	Walt Bellamy (30)	6–5
12	November 7	@ St. Louis	99–134	Walt Bellamy (20)	6–6
13	November 10	N Detroit	119–117	Walt Bellamy (33)	6–7
14	November 11	Philadelphia	123–114	Walt Bellamy (28)	6–8
15	November 14	Los Angeles	115–127	Gus Johnson (41)	7–8
16	November 17	Boston	99–102	Walt Bellamy (32)	8–8
17	November 20	Detroit	106–105	Walt Bellamy (29)	8–9
18	November 21	@ New York	94–103	Walt Bellamy (26)	8–10
19	November 24	@ St. Louis	109–108	Walt Bellamy (31)	9–10
20	November 25	Cincinnati	116–125	Gus Johnson (40)	10–10
21	November 29	@ Los Angeles	110–126	Walt Bellamy (32)	10–11
22	December 1	@ San Francisco	136–137 (2OT)	Don Ohl (42)	10–12
23	December 2	N San Francisco	114–120	Walt Bellamy (31)	11–12
24	December 4	St. Louis	106–108	Walt Bellamy (37)	12–12
25	December 5	N Philadelphia	125–108	Walt Bellamy (26)	12–13
26	December 6	N Cincinnati	124–113	Walt Bellamy (25)	12–14
27	December 8	N Philadelphia	102–97	Gus Johnson (28)	12–15
28	December 9	New York	111–90	Walt Bellamy (25)	12–16
29	December 12	@ Boston	99–112	Bailey Howell (26)	12–17
30	December 16	Philadelphia	120–140	Walt Bellamy (37)	13–17
31	December 19	Detroit	99–104	Walt Bellamy (33)	14–17
32	December 25	@ New York	114–108	Walt Bellamy (31)	15–17
33	December 26	New York	118–116	Walt Bellamy (30)	15–18
34	December 27	Cincinnati	119–126	Bellamy, Johnson (32)	16–18
35	December 30	Boston	121–114	Walt Bellamy (29)	16–19
36	January 1	N Cincinnati	140–124	Walt Bellamy (37)	16–20
37	January 2	San Francisco	103–129	Walt Bellamy (25)	17–20
38	January 3	San Francisco	132–142	Bailey Howell (37)	18–20
39	January 6	@ Detroit	129–121	Bailey Howell (28)	19–20
40	January 7	Detroit	105–110	Kevin Loughery (31)	20–20
41	January 9	Cincinnati	128–119	Kevin Loughery (25)	20–21
42	January 10	New York	122–120 (OT)	Don Ohl (36)	20–22
43	January 14	@ Philadelphia	138–126	Walt Bellamy (35)	21–22
44	January 16	N St. Louis	107–87	Walt Bellamy (25)	21–23
45	January 20	Boston	131–105	Walt Bellamy (32)	21–24
46	January 22	@ St. Louis	117–110	Don Ohl (30)	22–24
47	January 23	St. Louis	97–106	Walt Bellamy (31)	23–24
48	January 24	St. Louis	106–114	Don Ohl (31)	24–24
49	January 25	N Boston	142–104	Walt Bellamy (22)	24–25
50	January 27	@ Detroit	108–122	Walt Bellamy (30)	24–26
51	January 29	@ St. Louis	119–124	Walt Bellamy (27)	24–27
52	February 3	@ Boston	122–114	Don Ohl (30)	25–27
53	February 5	N San Francisco	120–112	Bailey Howell (23)	25–28
54	February 6	Los Angeles	112–116	Walt Bellamy (30)	26–28
55	February 7	@ Detroit	112–119	Don Ohl (32)	26–29
56	February 11	St. Louis	124–94	Walt Bellamy (21)	26–30
57	February 12	@ St. Louis	100–144	Bailey Howell (26)	26–31
58	February 13	Detroit	117–123	Walt Bellamy (30)	27–31
59	February 14	@ Boston	111–126	Walt Bellamy (24)	27–32
60	February 16	N New York	106–102	Don Ohl (25)	27–33
61	February 17	Cincinnati	114–125	Gus Johnson (29)	28–33
62	February 19	Los Angeles	119–111	Bailey Howell (35)	28–34
63	February 21	Philadelphia	107–106	Gus Johnson (30)	28–35
64	February 22	N Philadelphia	122–112	Walt Bellamy (32)	28–36
65	February 23	N Cincinnati	127–131	Bailey Howell (29)	29–36
66	February 24	New York	100–111	Gus Johnson (26)	30–36
67	February 27	@ New York	99–102	Gus Johnson (22)	30–37
68	February 28	San Francisco	116–129 (OT)	Don Ohl (33)	31–37
69	March 3	Cincinnati	108–151	Walt Bellamy (32)	32–37
70	March 5	Boston	124–128 (OT)	Walt Bellamy (41)	33–37
71	March 7	Detroit	105–111	Johnson, Loughery (21)	34–37
72	March 8	@ San Francisco	111–102	Bailey Howell (29)	35–37
73	March 9	@ Los Angeles	114–123	Walt Bellamy (24)	35–38
74	March 11	@ Los Angeles	116–121 (OT)	Walt Bellamy (28)	35–39
75	March 13	New York	114–102	Walt Bellamy (21)	35–40
76	March 14	Philadelphia	126–143	Walt Bellamy (33)	36–40
77	March 17	Los Angeles	106–117	Walt Bellamy (36)	37–40
78	March 18	@ Cincinnati	110–113	Walt Bellamy (32)	37–41
79	March 20	@ New York	114–118	Gus Johnson (25)	37–42
80	March 21	@ Philadelphia	105–127	Walt Bellamy (23)	37–43

== Playoffs ==
1965 playoff game log
Division semifinals: 3–1 (home: 2–0; road: 1–1)

Game	Date	Team	Score	High points	High rebounds	High assists	Location Attendance	Series
1	March 24	@ St. Louis	W 108–105	Bailey Howell (25)	Walt Bellamy (20)	three players tied (4)	Kiel Auditorium; 5,320	1–0
2	March 26	@ St. Louis	L 105–129	Don Ohl (23)	Walt Bellamy (12)	Gus Johnson (7)	Kiel Auditorium; 7,628	1–1
3	March 27	St. Louis	W 131–99	Bellamy, Ohl (23)	Walt Bellamy (18)	Johnson, Green (3)	Baltimore Civic Center; 6,358	2–1
4	March 30	St. Louis	W 109–103	Kevin Loughery (31)	Walt Bellamy (10)	Kevin Loughery (6)	Baltimore Civic Center; 6,423	3–1

Division finals: 2–4 (home: 2–1; road: 0–3)

Game	Date	Team	Score	High points	High rebounds	High assists	Location Attendance	Series
1	April 3	@ Los Angeles	L 115–121	Don Ohl (29)	Bailey Howell (20)	Walt Bellamy (5)	Los Angeles Memorial Sports Arena; 14,579	0–1
2	April 5	@ Los Angeles	L 115–118	Don Ohl (30)	Walt Bellamy (20)	Johnson, Bellamy (5)	Los Angeles Memorial Sports Arena; 10,594	0–2
3	April 7	Los Angeles	W 122–115	Bailey Howell (29)	Bailey Howell (17)	Johnson, Loughery (4)	Baltimore Civic Center; 7,247	1–2
4	April 9	Los Angeles	W 114–112	Don Ohl (28)	Walt Bellamy (16)	four players tied (3)	Baltimore Civic Center; 10,642	2–2
5	April 11	@ Los Angeles	L 112–120	Walt Bellamy (29)	Gus Johnson (16)	Bellamy, Howell (5)	Los Angeles Memorial Sports Arena; 15,013	2–3
6	April 13	Los Angeles	L 115–117	Don Ohl (34)	Walt Bellamy (15)	Walt Bellamy (5)	Baltimore Civic Center; 8,590	2–4

1965 schedule

== Awards and records ==
- Gus Johnson, All-NBA Second Team
- Wali Jones, NBA All-Rookie Team 1st Team
