= 1965–66 NBA season =

20th NBA season

- League: National Basketball Association
- Sport: Basketball
- Duration: October 15, 1965 – March 22, 1966; March 23 – April 15, 1966 (Playoffs); April 17–28, 1966 (Finals)
- Games: 80
- Teams: 9
- TV partner: ABC

Draft
- Top draft pick: Fred Hetzel
- Picked by: San Francisco Warriors

Regular season
- Top seed: Philadelphia 76ers
- Season MVP: Wilt Chamberlain (Philadelphia)
- Top scorer: Wilt Chamberlain (Philadelphia)

Playoffs
- Eastern champions: Boston Celtics
- Eastern runners-up: Philadelphia 76ers
- Western champions: Los Angeles Lakers
- Western runners-up: St. Louis Hawks

Finals
- Champions: Boston Celtics
- Runners-up: Los Angeles Lakers

NBA seasons
- ← 1964–65 1966–67 →

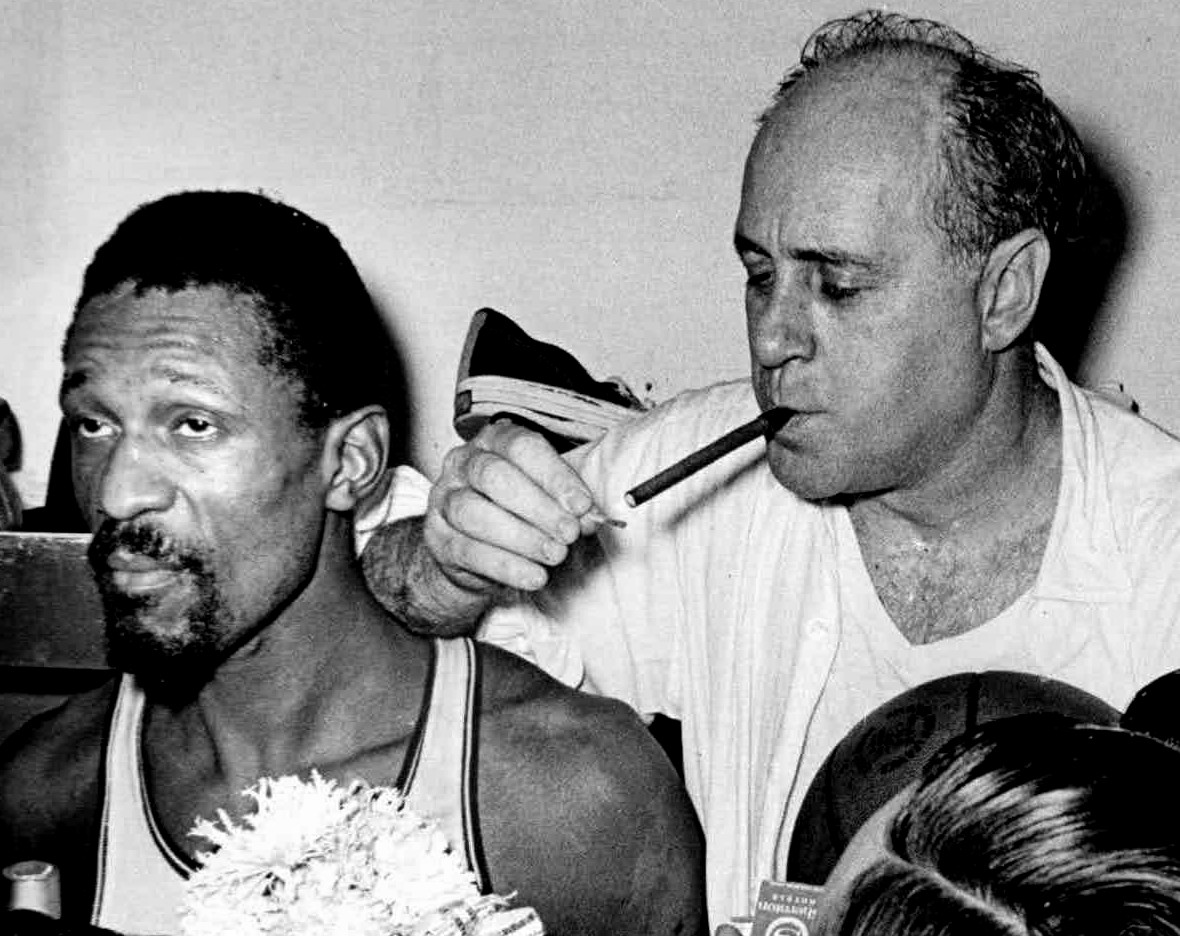
Bill Russell and Red Auerbach after winning the 1966 NBA Finals.

The 1965–66 NBA season was the 20th season of the National Basketball Association. The season ended with the Boston Celtics winning an unprecedented eighth straight NBA championship, beating the Los Angeles Lakers 4 games to 3 in the 1966 NBA Finals.

== Season recap ==
=== Leading teams ===
==== Sixers ====
The season started out looking good for Philadelphia 76ers star Wilt Chamberlain, as he had a full year with his new team after half a season the year before. The Sixers came together behind him and won the NBA East with 55 wins in 80 NBA games, the top record in the league.

Yet again, Chamberlain himself was a dominant force. His 1074 field goals were more than 250 ahead of the next top shooting scorer in the league. His 976 free throws tried were second most in the league, helping his NBA-high scoring average even with all the misses at the foul line. He also led the league in shooting accuracy, rebounds and minutes played. He also was 7th in assists.

==== Celtics ====
One game behind in the East, and the league, were the defending champions, the Boston Celtics. The team again featured seven ten-point scorers in Red Auerbach's balanced juggernaut, plus defender/point guard K.C. Jones. Bill Russell again led the defense from the middle. The much anticipated Boston-Philly matchup was the focus of the league all season.

=== Also-rans ===
After the two contenders, the nine-team NBA also featured two strong also-rans. The Los Angeles Lakers won 45 of 80 games to capture the West Division of the NBA, which produced no league champion 1959–1970. The Lakers were led by superstar Jerry West, whose 818 field goals made were tied for second most in the NBA. He also tried and made the most free throws in the league as he carried the Laker load, going 840 of 977 for an 86% clip. The Lakers' mediocre center play and more limping from Elgin Baylor held back the club's advancement.

The Cincinnati Royals won 45 games also, but were still stuck in the East Division behind the 76ers and Celtics while the Baltimore Bullets remained in the NBA West. The Royals were led again by Oscar Robertson and Jerry Lucas. Robertson matched West's 818 field goals made while also leading the NBA in assists. Robertson got a few more assists than West because he had Lucas to pass to. The Royals forward averaged 22 points and 21 rebounds per game for the season. West, Robertson, and Lucas accomplished their feats without the benefit of a three-point line.

=== Playoffs ===
Six of the NBA's nine teams made the playoffs, with the second and third place teams in each division meeting in the first round, and the East and West Division winners getting a first round bye, then meeting the first round winners in the second round.

In the East, Boston got another scare from Cincinnati, who jumped to a 2–1 series lead behind Robertson and Lucas, but the Celtics were able to recover and won the next two games to advance.

In the West, the injury-riddled Baltimore Bullets, led by Don Ohl, were swept by the St. Louis Hawks and player/coach Richie Guerin.

Boston met Philadelphia in the much-watched East Final. Wilt Chamberlain averaged 28 points and 30 rebounds for the series, but the Celtics won four of five games and featured dominant performances from Bill Russell, Sam Jones and John Havlicek all starred. The 114–110 overtime win in Game Four proved the turning point in the matchup. Chamberlain hit 28 of 68 free throws in the series, just a 41% clip. Los Angeles outlasted St. Louis in the West Final four games to three while Boston rested. The Lakers won three of the first four to set the tone of the series. Baylor had returned to lead a more-balanced cast in support of West.

=== Finals ===
Another Boston–L.A. Finals series went to seven games, with the Lakers putting up a stronger challenge against Boston’s deeper roster. Los Angeles Lakers players Jerry West and Elgin Baylor performed well throughout the series, but Boston’s balanced scoring helped secure a 95–93 Game 7 win at Boston Garden. Defense and rebounding once again played a major role, with Bill Russell standing out in both areas. After the season, coach Red Auerbach moved into a front-office role following another demanding playoff run. His teams won eight consecutive NBA championships and nine in ten seasons, establishing an early benchmark in league history through strong coaching, roster building, and tactical innovation.

== Notable occurrences ==
- The 1966 NBA All-Star Game was played at the Cincinnati Gardens in Cincinnati, with the East beating the West 137–94. Local hero Adrian Smith of the Royals won the game's MVP award.

Coaching changes
Offseason
Team	1964–65 coach	1965–66 coach
Baltimore Bullets	Buddy Jeannette	Paul Seymour
New York Knicks	Harry Gallatin	Dick McGuire
In-season
Team	Outgoing coach	Incoming coach
N/A

== Final standings ==
=== Eastern Division ===
Eastern Division	W	L	PCT	GB	Home	Road	Neutral	Div
x-Philadelphia 76ers	55	25	.688	–	22–3	20–17	13–5	20–10
x-Boston Celtics	54	26	.675	1	26–5	19–18	9–3	19–11
x-Cincinnati Royals	45	35	.563	10	25–6	11–23	9–6	16–14
New York Knicks	30	50	.375	25	20–14	4–30	6–6	5–25

=== Western Division ===
Western Division	W	L	PCT	GB	Home	Road	Neutral	Div
x-Los Angeles Lakers	45	35	.563	–	28–11	13–21	4–3	29–11
x-Baltimore Bullets	38	42	.475	7	29–9	4–25	5–8	20–20
x-St. Louis Hawks	36	44	.450	9	22–10	6–22	8–12	19–21
San Francisco Warriors	35	45	.438	10	12–14	8–19	15–12	21–19
Detroit Pistons	22	58	.275	23	13–17	4–22	5–19	11–29

x – clinched playoff spot

== Playoff bracket ==
Division Semifinals
E3	Cincinnati	2
E2	Boston	3
W3	St. Louis	3
W2	Baltimore	0

Division Finals
Eastern Division
E1	Philadelphia*	1
E2	Boston	4
Western Division
W1	Los Angeles*	4
W3	St. Louis	3

NBA Finals
E2	Boston	4
W1	Los Angeles*	3

- * Division winner
- Bold Series winner
- Italic Team with home-court advantage in NBA Finals

== Statistics leaders ==
Category	Player	Team	Stat
Points	Wilt Chamberlain	Philadelphia 76ers	2,649
Rebounds	Wilt Chamberlain	Philadelphia 76ers	1,943
Assists	Oscar Robertson	Cincinnati Royals	847
FG%	Wilt Chamberlain	Philadelphia 76ers	.540
FT%	Larry Siegfried	Boston Celtics	.881

Note: Prior to the 1969–70 season, league leaders in points, rebounds, and assists were determined by totals rather than averages.

== NBA awards ==
- Most Valuable Player: Wilt Chamberlain, Philadelphia 76ers
- Rookie of the Year: Rick Barry, San Francisco Warriors
- Coach of the Year: Dolph Schayes, Philadelphia 76ers
- All-NBA First Team:
  - F – Rick Barry, San Francisco Warriors
  - F – Jerry Lucas, Cincinnati Royals
  - C – Wilt Chamberlain, Philadelphia 76ers
  - G – Oscar Robertson, Cincinnati Royals
  - G – Jerry West, Los Angeles Lakers
- All-NBA Second Team:
  - G – Hal Greer, Philadelphia 76ers
  - G – Sam Jones, Boston Celtics
  - C – Bill Russell, Boston Celtics
  - F – Gus Johnson, Baltimore Bullets
  - F – John Havlicek, Boston Celtics
- NBA All-Rookie First Team:
  - Tom Van Arsdale, Detroit Pistons
  - Rick Barry, San Francisco Warriors
  - Dick Van Arsdale, New York Knicks
  - Billy Cunningham, Philadelphia 76ers
  - Fred Hetzel, San Francisco Warriors

== See also ==
- List of NBA regular season records
