= List of NBA on ABC commentators =

This includes a list of NBA on ABC commentators, sideline reporters, and analysts, through the years. The list covers current and former personnel, and their job function. In addition to the English-language broadcasts, ABC (also airs on ESPN) also has Spanish-language broadcasts on SAP using ESPN Deportes audio that began in 2015.

== Current ==
=== In-game ===
==== Play-by-play ====
- Mike Breen (2003, 2006–present)
- Ryan Ruocco (2013–present)
- Dave Pasch (2006–present)
- Marc Kestecher (2024–present)
- Mike Monaco (2026–present)
- Drew Carter (2026–present)

==== Analysts ====
- Doris Burke (2017–present)
- Richard Jefferson (co-lead) (2018–present)
- Stephanie White (2023–present)
- Tim Legler (co-lead) (2024–present)
- Jay Bilas (2024–present)
- Cory Alexander (2024–present)
- P. J. Carlesimo (2025–present)
- Danny Green (2026–present)
- Jeremy Lin (2026–present)
- Jason Kidd (2026–present)

==== Reporters ====
- Lisa Salters (lead) (2004–present)
- Jorge Sedano (2017–present)
- Katie George (2022–present)
- Angel Gray (2022–present)
- Alyssa Lang (2025–present)
- Malika Andrews (2025–present)
- Vanessa Richardson (2026–present)
- Tim MacMahon (2026–present)
- Taylor McGregor (2026–present)

==== Rules Analyst ====
- Steve Javie (2012–present)

=== Studio ===
==== Hosts ====
- Malika Andrews (2023–present)
- Ernie Johnson (2025–present)

==== Analysts ====
- Kendrick Perkins (2019–present)
- Shams Charania (2024–present)
- Brian Windhorst (2025–present)
- Shaquille O'Neal (2025–present)
- Kenny Smith (2025–present)
- Charles Barkley (2025–present)
- Jason Kidd (2026–present)

== Former ==
=== Play-by-play ===
- Adam Amin (2016–2020)
- Brian Custer (2021–2022)
- Jim Durham (2005–2006)
- Terry Gannon (2010–2013)
- Michael Grady (2024–2025)
- Mark Jones (2005–2026)
- Al Michaels (2003–2006)
- Beth Mowins (2021–2024)
- Brent Musburger (2002–2006)
- Brad Nessler (2002–2004)
- John Saunders (2005–2006)
- Mike Tirico (2006–2016)
- Bob Wischusen (2021)

=== Color analysts ===
- Hubie Brown (2004–2025)
- Rick Carlisle (2007–2008)
- Vince Carter (2020–2023)
- Doug Collins (basketball analyst, 2014–2017)
- Sean Elliott (2002–2004)
- Len Elmore (alternate game analyst, 2004–2006)
- Mark Jackson (2007–2011, 2014–2023)
- Steve Jones (2005–2006)
- Tim Legler (2006)
- Dan Majerle (2003–2004)
- Michael Malone (2026)
- Bob Myers (2023–2025)
- Jack Ramsay (2005)
- JJ Redick (2021–2024)
- Doc Rivers (2003–2004, 2023–2024)
- Tom Tolbert (2002–2003)
- Bill Walton (2002–2003, 2005–2006)
- Jeff Van Gundy (2007–2023)
- Stan Van Gundy (2018–2019)

=== Reporters ===
- David Aldridge (2002–2003)
- Kris Budden
- Doris Burke (2008–2019)
- Heather Cox (2008–2016)
- Rosalyn Gold-Onwude (2021–2025)
- Israel Gutierrez (2017–2022)
- Ariel Helwani (2019–2021)
- Cassidy Hubbarth (2016–2025)
- Mark Jones (2005–2007)
- Sal Masekela (2002–2003)
- Rachel Nichols (2020–2021)
- Tom Rinaldi (2017–2020)
- Michele Tafoya (2002–2008)

=== Studio hosts ===
- Michelle Beadle (2016–2019)
- Mike Greenberg (2021–2023)
- Rachel Nichols (2018–2021)
- Dan Patrick (2006–2007)
- John Saunders (substitute studio host from 2003 to 2005)
- Stuart Scott (2007–2011)
- Sage Steele (2013–2016)
- Hannah Storm (2011)
- Maria Taylor (2019–2021)
- Mike Tirico (studio host, 2002–2006)

=== Studio analysts ===
- Chauncey Billups (2018–2020)
- Doug Collins (2013–2016)
- Richard Jefferson (2019–2021)
- Avery Johnson (2008–2010)
- Magic Johnson (2008–2013; 2016–2017; 2021–2022)
- Steve Jones (2004–2005)
- George Karl (2003–2004)
- Michael Malone (2025–2026)
- Bob Myers (2023–2025)
- Paul Pierce (2017–2021)
- Scottie Pippen (2005–2006)
- Jalen Rose (2012–2023)
- Byron Scott (2004)
- Bill Simmons (2012–2014)
- Stephen A. Smith (2012–2025)
- Tom Tolbert (2002–2004)
- Bill Walton (2002–2003, 2004–2005, 2007–2008)
- Michael Wilbon (2005–2013; 2016–2017; 2021–2024)
- Jay Williams (2019–2021)
- Adrian Wojnarowski (2019–2024)

=== 1962–1973 version ===
- Marv Albert (game analyst)
- Howard Cosell (game analyst; sideline reporter)
- Bob Cousy (game analyst)
- Dave Diles (sideline reporter)
- Bill Flemming (play-by-play)
- Chet Forte (play-by-play)
- Jim Gordon (play-by-play)
- Curt Gowdy (play-by-play)
- Jerry Gross (play-by-play)
- Chuck Howard (game analyst)
- Keith Jackson (play-by-play)
- Johnny Kerr (game analyst)
- Jim McKay (play-by-play)
- Bill Russell (game analyst)
- Chris Schenkel (play-by-play)
- Jack Twyman (game analyst)
- Jerry West (game analyst)

==== Playoffs ====
Day	Date	Teams	Game	Time (EST)	Play-by-play	Color commentator(s)
Sun	3/28/65	76ers @ Royals	Game 3	2 p.m.	Chris Schenkel	Bob Cousy
Sun	4/4/65	76ers @ Celtics	Game 1	2 p.m.	Chris Schenkel	Bob Cousy
Sun	4/11/65	76ers @ Celtics	Game 5	2 p.m.	Chris Schenkel	Bob Cousy
Sun	4/18/65	Lakers @ Celtics	Game 1	2 p.m.	Chris Schenkel	Bob Cousy and Wilt Chamberlain
Sun	4/25/65	Lakers @ Celtics	Game 5	2 p.m.	Chris Schenkel	Bob Cousy
Sun	3/27/66	Royals @ Celtics	Game 3	2 p.m.	Chris Schenkel	Bob Cousy
Sun	4/3/66	Celtics @ 76ers	Game 1	2 p.m.	Chris Schenkel	Bob Cousy
Sun	4/10/66	76ers @ Celtics	Game 4	2 p.m.	Chris Schenkel	Bob Cousy
Sun	4/17/66	Lakers @ Celtics	Game 1	2 p.m.	Merle Harmon	Bob Cousy
Sun	4/24/66	Lakers @ Celtics	Game 5	2 p.m.	Chris Schenkel	Bob Cousy
Sun	3/26/67	Lakers @ Warriors	Game 3	2 p.m.	Curt Gowdy	Jack Twyman
Sun	4/2/67	76ers @ Celtics	Game 2	2 p.m.	Chet Forte	John Kerr
Sun	4/9/67	76ers @ Celtics	Game 4	2 p.m.	Chet Forte	Chuck Howard
Sun	4/16/67	Warriors @ 76ers	Game 2	2 p.m.	Bill Flemming	Jack Twyman
Sun	4/23/67	Warriors @ 76ers	Game 5	2 p.m.	Chris Schenkel	Jack Twyman
Sun	3/24/68	Pistons @ Celtics	Game 1	2 p.m.	Chris Schenkel	Jack Twyman
Sun	3/31/68	Knicks @ 76ers	Game 5	2 p.m.	Chris Schenkel	Jack Twyman
Sun	4/14/68	76ers @ Celtics	Game 4	2 p.m.	Jerry Gross	Jack Twyman
Sun	4/21/68	Lakers @ Celtics	Game 1	2 p.m.	Jerry Gross	Jack Twyman
Sun	3/30/69	Knicks @ Bullets	Game 3	2 p.m.	Chris Schenkel	Jack Twyman
Sun	4/6/69	Celtics @ Knicks	Game 1	2 p.m.	Chris Schenkel	Jack Twyman
Sun	4/13/69	Knicks @ Celtics	Game 4	2 p.m.	Jim Gordon	Jack Twyman
Sun	4/20/69	Hawks @ Lakers	Game 5	3:30 p.m.	Jerry Gross	Jack Twyman
Sun	4/27/69	Lakers @ Celtics	Game 3	2 p.m.	Chris Schenkel	Jack Twyman
Sat	5/3/69	Lakers @ Celtics	Game 6	5 p.m.	Chris Schenkel	Jack Twyman
Mon	5/5/69	Celtics @ Lakers	Game 7	10 p.m.	Chris Schenkel	Jack Twyman
Sun	4/5/70	Knicks @ Bullets				
Sun	4/5/70	Suns @ Lakers				
Sun	4/12/70	Lakers @ Hawks				
Fri	5/1/70	Knicks @ Lakers	Game 4	8 p.m.	Chris Schenkel	Jack Twyman
Fri	5/8/70	Lakers @ Knicks	Game 7	8 p.m.	Chris Schenkel	Jack Twyman
Sun	3/28/71	76ers @ Bullets	Game 3	2 p.m. (regional)	Chris Schenkel	Jack Twyman
Sun	3/28/71	Lakers @ Bulls	Game 3	2 p.m. (regional)	Keith Jackson	Jerry West
Sun	4/4/71	76ers @ Bullets	Game 7	2 p.m. (regional)	Chris Schenkel	Jack Twyman
Sun	4/4/71	Lakers @ Bulls	Game 6	2 p.m. (regional)	Keith Jackson	Jerry West
Fri	4/9/71	Lakers @ Bucks	Game 1	9 pm	Keith Jackson	Jerry West
Sun	4/11/71	Knicks @ Bullets	Game 3	2 pm	Chris Schenkel	Jack Twyman
Fri	4/16/71	Bullets @ Knicks	Game 5	7:30 p.m.	Chris Schenkel	Jack Twyman
Sun	4/18/71	Knicks @ Bullets	Game 6	2 p.m. (regional)	Chris Schenkel	Jack Twyman
Sun	4/18/71	Lakers @ Bucks	Game 5	2 p.m. (regional)	Keith Jackson	Jerry West
Mon	4/19/71	Bullets @ Knicks	Game 7	7:30 p.m.	Chris Schenkel	Jack Twyman
Wed	4/21/71	Bullets @ Bucks	Game 1	9 p.m.	Chris Schenkel	Jack Twyman
Sun	4/25/71	Bucks @ Bullets	Game 2	2 p.m.	Keith Jackson	Jack Twyman
Wed	4/28/71	Bullets @ Bucks	Game 3	9 p.m.	Chris Schenkel	Jack Twyman
Fri	4/30/71	Bucks @ Bullets	Game 4	8:30 p.m.	Chris Schenkel	Jack Twyman
Sun	4/2/72	Lakers @ Bulls	Game 3	2 p.m.	Chris Schenkel	Bill Russell
Sun	4/9/72	Knicks @ Bullets	Game 5	2 p.m.	Chris Schenkel	Bill Russell
Sun	4/9/72	Bucks @ Lakers	Game 1	4:30 p.m.	Keith Jackson	
Wed	4/12/72	Bucks @ Lakers	Game 2	10 p.m.	Keith Jackson	Bill Russell
Thu	4/13/72	Knicks @ Celtics	Game 1	7:30 p.m.		
Fri	4/14/72	Lakers @ Bucks	Game 3	9 p.m.	Chris Schenkel	Bill Russell
Sun	4/16/72	Celtics @ Knicks	Game 2	2 p.m.	Chris Schenkel	
Sun	4/16/72	Lakers @ Bucks	Game 4	5 p.m.	Keith Jackson	Bill Russell
Tue	4/18/72	Bucks @ Lakers	Game 5	10 p.m.	Chris Schenkel	Bill Russell
Fri	4/21/72	Celtics @ Knicks	Game 4	8 p.m.	Keith Jackson	Bill Russell
Sat	4/22/72	Lakers @ Bucks	Game 6	4:30 pm	Keith Jackson	Bill Russell
Sun	4/23/72	Knicks @ Celtics,	Game 5	1 p.m.	Keith Jackson	Bill Russell
Wed	4/26/72	Knicks @ Lakers	Game 1	10 p.m.	Keith Jackson	Bill Russell
Sun	4/30/72	Knicks @ Lakers	Game 2	4:30 p.m.	Keith Jackson	Bill Russell
Wed	5/3/72	Lakers @ Knicks	Game 3	8:30 p.m.	Keith Jackson	Bill Russell
Fri	5/5/72	Lakers @ Knicks	Game 4	8:30 p.m.	Keith Jackson	Bill Russell
Sun	5/7/72	Knicks @ Lakers	Game 5	10 p.m.	Keith Jackson	Bill Russell
Sun	4/1/73	Bullets @ Knicks	Game 2	2 p.m.	Chris Schenkel	Bill Russell
Sun	4/8/73	Bullets @ Knicks	Game 5	2 p.m.	Chris Schenkel	Bill Russell
Sun	4/8/73	Lakers @ Bulls	Game 4	4:15 p.m.	Keith Jackson	
Fri	4/13/73	Lakers @ Bulls	Game 6	8:30 p.m.	Keith Jackson	Bill Russell
Sun	4/15/73	Knicks @ Celtics	Game 1	2 p.m.	Chris Schenkel	Bill Russell
Fri	4/20/73	Knicks @ Celtics	Game 3	8 p.m.	Keith Jackson	Bill Russell
Sun	4/22/73	Celtics @ Knicks	Game 4	2 p.m.	Keith Jackson	Bill Russell
Wed	4/25/73	Knicks @ Celtics	Game 5	8 p.m.	Chris Schenkel	Bill Russell
Fri	4/27/73	Celtics @ Knicks	Game 6	9 p.m.	Keith Jackson	Bill Russell
Sun	4/29/73	Knicks @ Celtics	Game 7	2 p.m.	Keith Jackson	Bill Russell
Thu	5/3/73	Knicks @ Lakers	Game 2	10:30 pm	Keith Jackson	Bill Russell
Sun	5/6/73	Lakers @ Knicks	Game 3	2 p.m.	Chris Schenkel	Bill Russell
Tue	5/8/73	Lakers @ Knicks	Game 4	8:30 p.m.	Keith Jackson	Bill Russell
Thu	5/10/73	Knicks @ Lakers	Game 5	10:30 p.m.	Keith Jackson	Bill Russell

== Spanish ==
Since 2015, games are available in Spanish on SAP using ESPN Deportes audio. Until 2014, the games had a Spanish version on SAP with different commentators from the ESPN Deportes telecast.

- Álvaro Martín
- Carlos Morales
- Jerry Olaya
- Roberto Abramowitz
- Fernando Álvarez
- Pablo Viruega
- Manu Martín
- Sebastián Martínez Christensen
- Leopoldo González
- Robert Sierra
