= 1965–66 St. Louis Hawks season =

NBA professional basketball team season

- Head coach: Richie Guerin
- Arena: Kiel Auditorium

Results
- Record: 36–44 (.450)
- Place: Division: 3rd (Western)
- Playoff finish: West Division Finals (Eliminated 3–4)
- Stats at Basketball Reference

The 1965–66 St. Louis Hawks season was the Hawks' 17th season in the NBA and 11th season in St. Louis.

== Regular season ==
=== Season standings ===
Western Division	W	L	PCT	GB	Home	Road	Neutral	Div
x-Los Angeles Lakers	45	35	.563	–	28–11	13–21	4–3	29–11
x-Baltimore Bullets	38	42	.475	7	29–9	4–25	5–8	20–20
x-St. Louis Hawks	36	44	.450	9	22–10	6–22	8–12	19–21
San Francisco Warriors	35	45	.438	10	12–14	8–19	15–12	21–19
Detroit Pistons	22	58	.275	23	13–17	4–22	5–19	11–29

=== Game log ===
1965–66 Game log
#	Date	Opponent	Score	High points	Record
1	October 15	@ Cincinnati	W 111–100	Lenny Wilkens (28)	1–0
2	October 16	Los Angeles	L 94–106	Lenny Wilkens (18)	1–1
3	October 20	@ Baltimore	L 99–119	Jim Washington (19)	1–2
4	October 23	Boston	W 120–110	Zelmo Beaty (24)	2–2
5	October 30	Detroit	W 122–95	Zelmo Beaty (22)	3–2
6	November 3	@ Los Angeles	L 116–120	Richie Guerin (30)	3–3
7	November 5	@ Los Angeles	L 116–118	Richie Guerin (25)	3–4
8	November 6	Los Angeles	W 131–101	Zelmo Beaty (23)	4–4
9	November 10	@ Baltimore	L 117–124	Lenny Wilkens (27)	4–5
10	November 11	@ Boston	L 83–87	Zelmo Beaty (19)	4–6
11	November 13	San Francisco	W 138–113	Bridges, Wilkens (20)	5–6
12	November 16	vs. Philadelphia	L 98–107	Zelmo Beaty (20)	5–7
13	November 20	Detroit	W 110–101	Lenny Wilkens (20)	6–7
14	November 22	vs. San Francisco	L 108–112	Beaty, Guerin (29)	6–8
15	November 24	@ Cincinnati	L 108–112	Bill Bridges (31)	6–9
16	November 25	San Francisco	W 119–113	Lenny Wilkens (29)	7–9
17	November 27	Baltimore	W 136–110	Zelmo Beaty (30)	8–9
18	November 28	@ Baltimore	L 102–110	Richie Guerin (24)	8–10
19	November 30	@ New York	L 119–138	Chico Vaughn (23)	8–11
20	December 1	@ Detroit	W 110–101	Zelmo Beaty (30)	9–11
21	December 4	Boston	L 94–100	Richie Guerin (23)	9–12
22	December 5	vs. San Francisco	W 113–99	Richie Guerin (30)	10–12
23	December 7	vs. Boston	L 96–112	Richie Guerin (22)	10–13
24	December 8	vs. New York	W 104–93	Beaty, Bridges (24)	11–13
25	December 10	New York	L 106–109	Cliff Hagan (26)	11–14
26	December 11	@ Los Angeles	L 108–126	John Barnhill (17)	11–15
27	December 12	@ Los Angeles	L 101–123	Cliff Hagan (25)	11–16
28	December 15	vs. San Francisco	L 113–128	Cliff Hagan (28)	11–17
29	December 17	@ San Francisco	W 103–102	Cliff Hagan (32)	12–17
30	December 25	@ New York	W 131–111	Beaty, Guerin (21)	13–17
31	December 26	Cincinnati	L 115–117	Bill Bridges (21)	13–18
32	December 27	vs. Los Angeles	L 100–108	Richie Guerin (25)	13–19
33	December 28	Los Angeles	L 100–107	Zelmo Beaty (20)	13–20
34	December 30	Philadelphia	W 130–113	Zelmo Beaty (22)	14–20
35	January 1	Boston	W 100–98	Lenny Wilkens (25)	15–20
36	January 3	vs. Cincinnai	L 114–130	Cliff Hagan (30)	15–21
37	January 5	@ Baltimore	L 101–114	Zelmo Beaty (22)	15–22
38	January 7	@ Detroit	L 97–137	Richie Guerin (22)	15–23
39	January 8	Philadelphia	W 115–105	Zelmo Beaty (36)	16–23
40	January 9	Philadelphia	L 117–127	Zelmo Beaty (30)	16–24
41	January 13	vs. Cincinnati	L 102–107	Lenny Wilkens (22)	16–25
42	January 14	Baltimore	L 119–121	Zelmo Beaty (35)	16–26
43	January 16	Baltimore	W 136–128	Cliff Hagan (33)	17–26
44	January 17	vs. New York	W 115–106	Zelmo Beaty (26)	18–26
45	January 18	New York	W 109–107	Lenny Wilkens (20)	19–26
46	January 20	vs. Detroit	W 103–92	Richie Guerin (25)	20–26
47	January 21	@ Detroit	L 108–117	Lenny Wilkens (23)	20–27
48	January 22	New York	W 119–111	Zelmo Beaty (28)	21–27
49	January 23	Philadelphia	L 98–104	Zelmo Beaty (33)	21–28
50	January 24	vs. Philadelphia	L 107–110	Zelmo Beaty (27)	21–29
51	January 25	San Francisco	W 142–107	Zelmo Beaty (22)	22–29
52	January 28	San Francisco	L 104–114	Lenny Wilkens (28)	22–30
53	January 29	@ Cincinnati	L 115–116	Zelmo Beaty (29)	22–31
54	January 30	Cincinnai	W 115–98	Lenny Wilkens (25)	23–31
55	February 2	vs. Philadelphia	W 96–89	Beaty, Hagan (21)	24–31
56	February 3	@ Baltimore	L 113–122	Zelmo Beaty (29)	24–32
57	February 4	@ Boston	L 95–117	Zelmo Beaty (17)	24–33
58	February 6	Los Angeles	W 109–105	Joe Caldwell (28)	25–33
59	February 7	vs. Baltimore	L 104–111	Lenny Wilkens (24)	25–34
60	February 13	Cincinnati	W 104–102	Bill Bridges (28)	26–34
61	February 15	vs. Philadelphia	L 109–121	Zelmo Beaty (28)	26–35
62	February 20	Baltimore	W 126–123	Joe Caldwell (30)	27–35
63	February 22	@ New York	L 108–113	Richie Guerin (32)	27–36
64	February 24	@ Boston	L 106–134	Zelmo Beaty (21)	27–37
65	February 27	Detroit	W 125–114	Lenny Wilkens (26)	28–37
66	February 28	vs. Detroit	W 108–103	Zelmo Beaty (28)	29–37
67	March 1	Boston	L 95–120	Zelmo Beaty (20)	29–38
68	March 4	vs. Boston	W 132–112	Caldwell, Thorn (28)	30–38
69	March 6	New York	L 106–119	Joe Caldwell (26)	31–38
70	March 7	vs. Boston	L 104–106	Zelmo Beaty (39)	31–39
71	March 8	vs. Philadelphia	L 106–112	Zelmo Beaty (26)	31–40
72	March 9	@ Philadelphia	L 115–123	Beaty, Wilkens (29)	31–41
73	March 12	@ Cincinnati	W 114–113	Zelmo Beaty (28)	32–41
74	March 13	Cincinnati	W 115–106	Lenny Wilkens (24)	33–41
75	March 15	vs. San Francisco	W 110–109	Zelmo Beaty (27)	34–41
76	March 17	@ San Francisco	L 112–116	Lenny Wilkens (29)	34–42
77	March 18	@ Los Angeles	L 120–132	Zelmo Beaty (31)	34–43
78	March 19	Detroit	W 115–112	Zelmo Beaty (25)	35–43
79	March 20	@ Detroit	W 121–117	Richie Guerin (37)	36–43
80	March 22	@ New York	L 125–126	Bill Bridges (20)	36–44

== Playoffs ==
1966 playoff game log
Division Semifinals: 3–0 (home: 1–0; road: 2–0)

Game	Date	Team	Score	High points	High rebounds	High assists	Location Attendance	Series
1	March 24	@ Baltimore	W 113–111	Joe Caldwell (33)	Bill Bridges (19)	Richie Guerin (12)	Baltimore Civic Center; 3,587	1–0
2	March 27	@ Baltimore	W 105–100	Richie Guerin (25)	Bill Bridges (19)	Richie Guerin (8)	Baltimore Civic Center; 13,104	2–0
3	March 30	Baltimore	W 121–112	Bill Bridges (32)	Bill Bridges (20)	Lenny Wilkens (10)	Kiel Auditorium; 7,135	3–0

Division Finals: 3–4 (home: 2–1; road: 1–3)

Game	Date	Team	Score	High points	High rebounds	High assists	Location Attendance	Series
1	April 1	@ Los Angeles	L 106–129	Beaty, Guerin (22)	Zelmo Beaty (14)	Richie Guerin (8)	Los Angeles Memorial Sports Arena; 11,509	0–1
2	April 3	@ Los Angeles	L 116–125	Zelmo Beaty (36)	Bill Bridges (16)	Lenny Wilkens (9)	Los Angeles Memorial Sports Arena; 14,896	0–2
3	April 6	Los Angeles	W 120–113	Bill Bridges (27)	Bill Bridges (17)	Richie Guerin (8)	Kiel Auditorium; 8,318	1–2
4	April 9	Los Angeles	L 95–107	Zelmo Beaty (22)	Zelmo Beaty (19)	Richie Guerin (7)	Kiel Auditorium; 9,569	1–3
5	April 10	@ Los Angeles	W 112–100	Lenny Wilkens (29)	Zelmo Beaty (19)	Lenny Wilkens (12)	Los Angeles Memorial Sports Arena; 14,297	2–3
6	April 13	Los Angeles	W 127–131	Bill Bridges (29)	Bridges, Beaty (11)	Richie Guerin (11)	Kiel Auditorium; 8,614	3–3
7	April 15	@ Los Angeles	L 121–130	Cliff Hagan (29)	Bill Bridges (13)	Richie Guerin (5)	Los Angeles Memorial Sports Arena; 15,200	3–4

1966 schedule
