= 1966 NBA Finals =

North America basketball championship

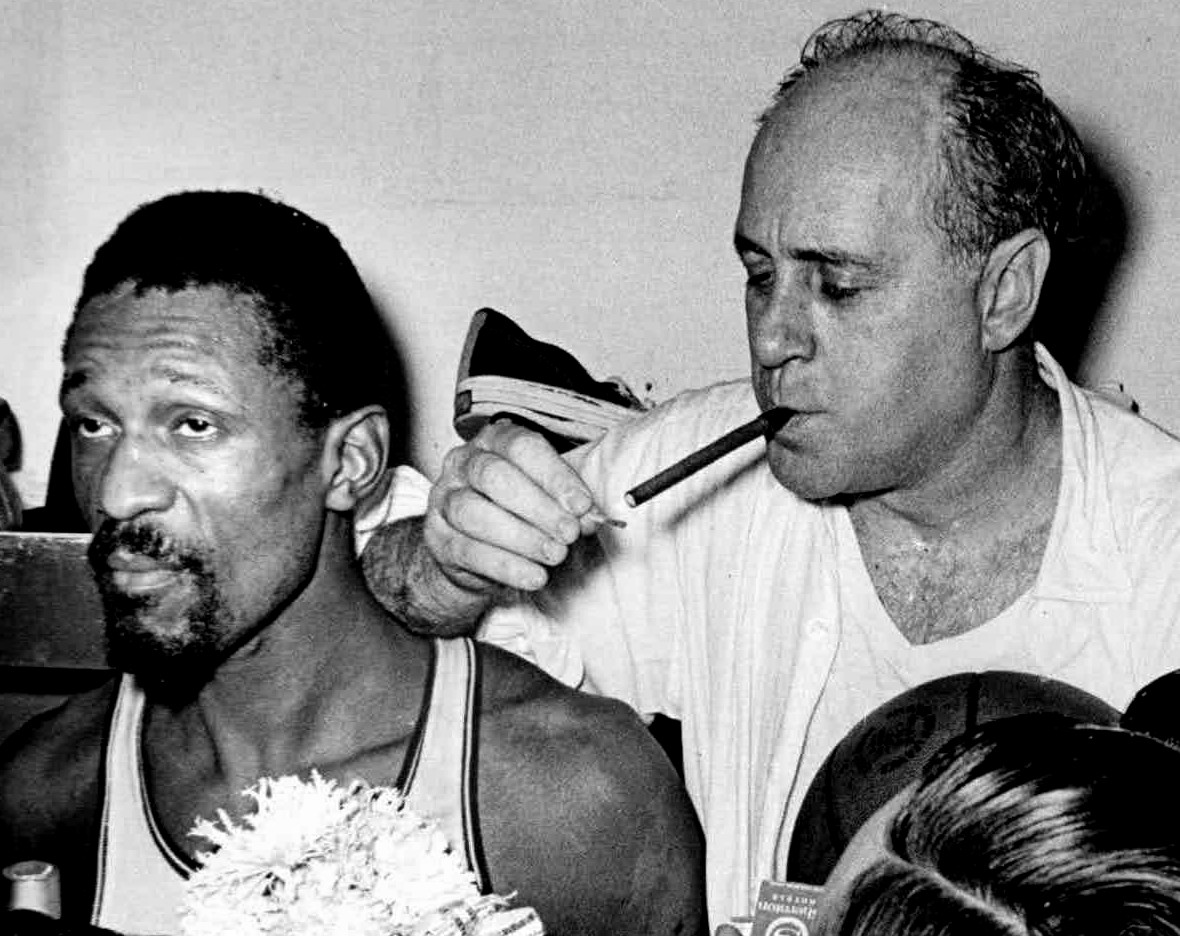
- Bill Russell and Red Auerbach after winning their eighth consecutive NBA title
Team	Coach	Wins
Boston Celtics	Red Auerbach	4
Los Angeles Lakers	Fred Schaus	3
- Dates: April 17–28
- Hall of Famers: Celtics: John Havlicek (1984); K. C. Jones (1989); Sam Jones (1984); Don Nelson (2012, coach); Bill Russell (1975); Satch Sanders (2011, contributor); John Thompson (1999, coach); Lakers: Elgin Baylor (1977); Gail Goodrich (1996); Jerry West (1980); Officials: Mendy Rudolph (2007); Earl Strom (1995)
- Eastern finals: Celtics defeated 76ers, 4–1
- Western finals: Lakers defeated Hawks, 4–3

The 1966 NBA World Championship Series was the championship round of the 1966 NBA playoffs, which concluded the National Basketball Association (NBA)'s 1965–66 season. The Eastern Division champion Boston Celtics faced the Western Division champion Los Angeles Lakers in a best-of-seven series that the Celtics won four games to three. For the Celtics this was their tenth straight finals appearance, which tied a North American professional sports record set by the NHL's Montreal Canadiens from 1951 to 1960.

Thus Boston won its eighth consecutive league title, which no other team has achieved in North American professional sports competition. Before Game 2, after the Los Angeles Lakers' comeback overtime win in Game 1, Red Auerbach, who had challenged the entire league to topple the Celtics from their reign by announcing he would retire after the season was over (thus giving his detractors "one last shot" at him), announced Bill Russell as the Celtics' coach for the 1966–67 season. Russell would be the first African American to coach in the NBA. Laker coach Fred Schaus privately fumed that Auerbach's hiring had taken away all of the accolades his Lakers should have received following their tremendous Game 1 win. The Celtics won the next three games and looked ready to close out Los Angeles in Game 5. However, the Lakers won the next two games, setting the stage for another classic Game 7 in the Boston Garden. The Celtics raced out to a huge lead and held off a late Los Angeles rally to capture the NBA title and send Red Auerbach out a champion.

This was the last NBA Finals until 2016 in which a team trailing 3–1 in the series rallied to force a Game 7.

== Series summary ==
Game	Date	Home team	Result	Road team
Game 1	April 17	Boston Celtics	129–133 (OT) (0–1)	Los Angeles Lakers
Game 2	April 19	Boston Celtics	129–109 (1–1)	Los Angeles Lakers
Game 3	April 20	Los Angeles Lakers	106–120 (1–2)	Boston Celtics
Game 4	April 22	Los Angeles Lakers	117–122 (1–3)	Boston Celtics
Game 5	April 24	Boston Celtics	117–121 (3–2)	Los Angeles Lakers
Game 6	April 26	Los Angeles Lakers	123–115 (3–3)	Boston Celtics
Game 7	April 28	Boston Celtics	95–93 (4–3)	Los Angeles Lakers

Celtics win series 4–3

== Team rosters ==
=== Boston Celtics ===
1965–66 Boston Celtics roster
Players

Pos.	No.	Player	Height	Weight	DOB	From
SG	21	(United States)	Ron Bonham	6 ft 5 in (1.96 m)	192 lb (87 kg)		Cincinnati
C	11	(United States)	Mel Counts	7 ft 0 in (2.13 m)	230 lb (104 kg)		Oregon State
G/F	28	(United States)	Si Green	6 ft 2 in (1.88 m)	185 lb (84 kg)		Duquesne
G/F	17	(United States)	John Havlicek	6 ft 5 in (1.96 m)	203 lb (92 kg)		Ohio State
PG	25	(United States)	K. C. Jones	6 ft 1 in (1.85 m)	200 lb (91 kg)		San Francisco
SG	24	(United States)	Sam Jones	6 ft 4 in (1.93 m)	198 lb (90 kg)		North Carolina Central
SF	12	(United States)	Willie Naulls	6 ft 6 in (1.98 m)	225 lb (102 kg)		UCLA
F	19	(United States)	Don Nelson	6 ft 6 in (1.98 m)	210 lb (95 kg)		Iowa
C	6	(United States)	Bill Russell	6 ft 9 in (2.06 m)	215 lb (98 kg)		San Francisco
SF	16	(United States)	Satch Sanders	6 ft 6 in (1.98 m)	210 lb (95 kg)		NYU
PF	18	(United States)	Woody Sauldsberry	6 ft 7 in (2.01 m)	220 lb (100 kg)		Texas Southern
C/G	20	(United States)	Larry Siegfried	6 ft 3 in (1.91 m)	190 lb (86 kg)		Ohio State
C	5	(United States)	John Thompson	6 ft 10 in (2.08 m)	225 lb (102 kg)		Providence
F	12	(United States)	Ron Watts	6 ft 6 in (1.98 m)	210 lb (95 kg)		Wake Forest

Coaches
Head coach

Red Auerbach

Legend
- (DP) Unsigned draft pick
- (FA) Free agent
- (S) Suspended
- Injured

=== Los Angeles Lakers ===
1965–66 Los Angeles Lakers roster
Players

Pos.	No.	Player	Height	Weight	DOB	From
SF	22	Elgin Baylor	6 ft 5 in (1.96 m)	225 lb (102 kg)	1934-09-16	Seattle
PF	15	Bob Boozer	6 ft 8 in (2.03 m)	215 lb (98 kg)	1937-04-26	Kansas State
C	25	Leroy Ellis	6 ft 10 in (2.08 m)	210 lb (95 kg)	1940-03-10	St. John's
SF	33	John Fairchild	6 ft 8 in (2.03 m)	205 lb (93 kg)	1943-04-28	BYU
SG	11	Gail Goodrich	6 ft 1 in (1.85 m)	170 lb (77 kg)	1943-04-23	UCLA
SG	42	Walt Hazzard	6 ft 2 in (1.88 m)	185 lb (84 kg)	1942-04-15	UCLA
C	14	Darrall Imhoff	6 ft 10 in (2.08 m)	220 lb (100 kg)	1938-10-11	California
PG	21	Jim King	6 ft 2 in (1.88 m)	175 lb (79 kg)	1941-02-07	Tulsa
PF	35	Rudy LaRusso	6 ft 7 in (2.01 m)	220 lb (100 kg)	1937-11-11	Dartmouth
PG	44	Jerry West	6 ft 3 in (1.91 m)	175 lb (79 kg)	1938-05-28	West Virginia
C	12	Gene Wiley	6 ft 10 in (2.08 m)	210 lb (95 kg)	1937-11-12	Wichita State

Coaches
Head coach
- Fred Schaus

Legend
- (DP) Unsigned draft pick
- (FA) Free agent
- (S) Suspended
- Injured

Roster

== Box scores ==
April 17

Boxscore

Los Angeles Lakers 133, Boston Celtics 129 (OT)
Scoring by quarter: 20–34, 41–28, 34–37, 26–22, Overtime: 12–8
Pts: Jerry West 41; Rebs: Elgin Baylor 20; Asts: Gail Goodrich 5	Pts: Bill Russell 28; Rebs: Bill Russell 26; Asts: Sam Jones 9
Los Angeles leads series, 1–0

Boston Garden, Boston, Massachusetts
Attendance: 13,909

April 19

Boxscore

Los Angeles Lakers 109, Boston Celtics 129
Scoring by quarter: 25–35, 22–36, 35–30, 27–28
Pts: Jerry West 18; Rebs: Elgin Baylor 14; Asts: Walt Hazzard 5	Pts: Havlicek, S. Jones 21 each Rebs: Bill Russell 24; Asts: John Havlicek 7
Series tied, 1–1

Boston Garden, Boston, Massachusetts
Attendance: 13,909

April 20

Boxscore

Boston Celtics 120, Los Angeles Lakers 106
Scoring by quarter: 25–29, 32–27, 35–19, 28–31
Pts: Sam Jones 36; Rebs: Bill Russell 19; Asts: Sanders, K. C. Jones 5 each	Pts: Jerry West 34; Rebs: Elgin Baylor 15; Asts: Jim King 6
Boston leads series, 2–1

Los Angeles Memorial Sports Arena, Los Angeles, California
Attendance: 15,101

April 22

Boxscore

Boston Celtics 122, Los Angeles Lakers 117
Scoring by quarter: 31–27, 35–29, 34–33, 22–28
Pts: John Havlicek 32; Rebs: Bill Russell 18; Asts: Larry Siegfried 7	Pts: Jerry West 45; Rebs: Elgin Baylor 12; Asts: Jerry West 10
Boston leads series, 3–1

Los Angeles Memorial Sports Arena, Los Angeles, California
Attendance: 15,251

April 24

Boxscore

Los Angeles Lakers 121, Boston Celtics 117
Scoring by quarter: 37–23, 27–35, 26–31, 31–28
Pts: Elgin Baylor 41; Rebs: Elgin Baylor 16; Asts: Jerry West 5	Pts: Bill Russell 32; Rebs: Bill Russell 28; Asts: Siegfried, K. C. Jones 6 each
Boston leads series, 3–2

Boston Garden, Boston, Massachusetts
Attendance: 13,909

April 26

Boxscore

Boston Celtics 115, Los Angeles Lakers 123
Scoring by quarter: 29–32, 29–36, 32–21, 25–34
Pts: John Havlicek 27; Rebs: Bill Russell 23; Asts: K. C. Jones 6	Pts: Jerry West 32; Rebs: Elgin Baylor 14; Asts: Jerry West 7
Series tied, 3–3

Los Angeles Memorial Sports Arena, Los Angeles, California
Attendance: 15,069

April 28

Boxscore

Los Angeles Lakers 93, Boston Celtics 95
Scoring by quarter: 20–27, 18–26, 22–23, 33–19
Pts: Jerry West 36; Rebs: Elgin Baylor 14; Asts: West, Hazzard 3 each	Pts: Bill Russell 25; Rebs: Bill Russell 32; Asts: Sanders, K. C. Jones 3 each
Boston wins series, 4–3

Boston Garden, Boston, Massachusetts
Attendance: 13,909

== See also ==
- 1966 NBA playoffs
- 1965–66 NBA season
