= Joe Caldwell =

American basketball player (born 1941)

Personal information
- Born: November 1, 1941 (age 85) Texas City, Texas, U.S.
- Listed height: 6 ft 5 in (1.96 m)
- Listed weight: 195 lb (88 kg)

Career information
- High school: John C. Fremont (Los Angeles, California)
- College: Arizona State (1961–1964)
- NBA draft: 1964: 1st round, 2nd overall pick
- Drafted by: Detroit Pistons
- Playing career: 1964–1975
- Position: Shooting guard / small forward
- Number: 21, 27

Career history
- 1964–1965: Detroit Pistons
- 1965–1970: St. Louis/Atlanta Hawks
- 1970–1975: Carolina Cougars/Spirits of St. Louis

Career highlights
- 2× NBA All-Star (1969, 1970); 2× ABA All-Star (1971, 1973); All-ABA Second Team (1971); NBA All-Defensive Second Team (1970); ABA All-Defensive First Team (1973); NBA All-Rookie First Team (1965); Third-team All-American – NABC (1963); 2× First-team All-WAC (1963, 1964); No. 32 jersey retired by Arizona State Sun Devils; Second-team Parade All-American (1960)

Career NBA and ABA statistics
- Points: 12,619 (16.1 ppg)
- Rebounds: 4,117 (5.3 rpg)
- Assists: 2,647 (3.4 apg)
- Stats at NBA.com
- Stats at Basketball Reference
Medals
Men's basketball
Representing United States
Gold medal – first place	1964 Tokyo	Team competition

Joe Louis Caldwell (born November 1, 1941) is an American former professional basketball player. Caldwell played six seasons (1964–1970) in the National Basketball Association (NBA) and five seasons (1970–1975) in the American Basketball Association (ABA). Caldwell was one of the few players to be an All-Star in both leagues, making 2 All-Star teams in each league. Caldwell was a member of the United States Olympic basketball team that won the gold medal in the 1964 Summer Olympics. Caldwell was Team USA's fourth leading scorer.

== Early life ==
Caldwell was one of 11 children born in Texas City, near Houston, Texas. He was the son of a longshoreman and mechanic and a homemaker. When he was six, Caldwell witnessed the Texas City disaster in 1947, when a docked ship blew up and 581 people died with thousands injured. Caldwell's family was left unharmed, but he said decades later, "I can still see people flying through the air."

When Caldwell was 15, he moved with his sister to Los Angeles, California. He emerged as a late-bloomer player and John Wooden courted him to play for him at UCLA. He ended up at Arizona State instead.

== Collegiate and Olympic career ==
Caldwell attended John C. Fremont High School in Los Angeles, not playing until his junior year. He then played collegiately at Arizona State University. Caldwell played for Arizona State from 1961 to 1964, setting the Sun Devils career scoring record with 1,515 points (18.2 ppg). His 929 rebounds (11.2), are the second-best total in school history. Caldwell led Arizona State to the NCAA Tournament in each of his three varsity seasons and a 65–18 overall record.

Selected to the U.S.A. Team, Caldwell was the fourth-leading scorer (9.0 ppg) on the 1964 United States men's Olympic basketball team. Team U.S.A. went 9–0 under coach Hank Iba to capture the Olympic gold medal in Tokyo, Japan. Caldwell scored 14 points for the US in the 73–59 gold medal game victory over the Soviet Union.

== Professional career ==
Caldwell was a 6 ft 5 in (1.96 m) guard/forward. In the 1964 NBA draft, Caldwell was the No. 2 overall pick by the Detroit Pistons. Olympic teammate Jim "Bad News" Barnes went No. 1. After averaging 21.1 points per game for the Atlanta Hawks in the 1969–70 NBA season, Caldwell averaged a team-leading 25 points per game during the 1970 NBA playoffs, as the Hawks beat the Chicago Bulls in the first round before losing to the Los Angeles Lakers in the Western Division Finals. Caldwell then jumped to the rival ABA, playing for the Carolina Cougars from 1970 to 1974.

Caldwell's contract with Carolina called for him to earn $150,000 per year and another $70,000 deferred for five years. A clause called for him to receive $6,600 per month beginning at age 55. Later, the Carolina owner, Tedd Munchak, sued to try to negate the pension. Caldwell was interviewed on 60 Minutes, who ran a segment on the lawsuit. Caldwell prevailed and received his pension payments beginning in 1996.

During the 1974–75 ABA season, the Carolina franchise had moved to become the St. Louis Spirits. Spirits' management blamed Caldwell for influencing team star Marvin Barnes to briefly leave the team. Caldwell denied doing this but he was suspended for "activities detrimental to the best interests of professional basketball." Caldwell never played another professional basketball game. He filed various lawsuits, alleging that he was wrongly blacklisted by the ABA and later the NBA. Tedd Munchak, who was suing Caldwell was now Commissioner of the ABA. Caldwell, who was President of the ABA Players Association, had his case (Caldwell vs. American Basketball Association, 95–1012) go all the way to the Supreme Court. Caldwell averaged 16.1 points, 5.3 rebounds and 3.1 assists in eleven professional seasons. He scored 12,619 combined NBA/ABA career points.

== Personal life ==
Caldwell is the grandfather of Marvin Bagley III, a power forward/Center for the Dallas Mavericks and Marcus Bagley, a small forward for the Philadelphia 76ers. Bagley's mother is Caldwell's daughter, Tracy Caldwell. Bagley was the No. 2 overall selection in the 2018 NBA draft, the same pick as his grandfather in the 1964 NBA draft. Caldwell attended his grandson's games throughout high school and college.

== Career statistics ==
Legend
GP	Games played	GS	Games started	MPG	Minutes per game
FG%	Field goal percentage	3P%	3-point field goal percentage	FT%	Free throw percentage
RPG	Rebounds per game	APG	Assists per game	SPG	Steals per game
BPG	Blocks per game	PPG	Points per game	**Bold**	Career high
*	Led the league

=== NBA/ABA ===
==== Regular season ====
Year	Team	GP	GS	MPG	FG%	3P%	FT%	RPG	APG	SPG	BPG	PPG
1964–65	Detroit	66		23.4	.374		.614	6.7	1.8			10.7
1965–66	Detroit	33		21.7	.423		.682	5.8	2.0			10.5
1965–66	S.L. Hawks	46		24.8	.447		**.717**	5.3	1.3			14.2
1966–67	S.L. Hawks	81*		27.9	.426		.649	5.5	2.0			13.8
1967–68	S.L. Hawks	79		33.4	.463		.569	4.3	3.0			16.4
1968–69	Atlanta	81		33.6	**.507**		.537	3.7	4.0			15.8
1969–70	Atlanta	**82***		34.8	**.507**		.688	5.0	3.5			21.1
1970–71	Carolina (ABA)	72		**41.8**	.448	.200	.558	**6.8**	4.2			**23.3**
1971–72	Carolina (ABA)	61		35.2	.471	.250	.500	5.6	4.2			16.9
1972–73	Carolina (ABA)	77		35.6	.496	.167	.425	5.1	4.6	**2.2**		16.7
1973–74	Carolina (ABA)	79		33.6	.489	.176	.496	5.2	4.4	**2.2**	**.4**	14.4
1974–75	S.L. Spirits (ABA)	25		33.6	.494	**.429**	.448	4.4	**5.1**	2.0	**.4**	14.6
Career (NBA)		468		29.6	.459		.634	5.1	2.7			15.2
Career (ABA)		314		36.3	.475	.225	.497	5.6	4.4	2.1	.4	17.5
Career (overall)		782		32.3	.466	.225	.572	5.3	3.4	2.1	.4	16.1
All-Star (NBA)		2	0	21.0	.550		.600	5.5	2.0			12.5
All-Star (ABA)		2		27.5	.542	–	.500	6.5	2.5	1.0	1.0	14.0
All-Star (overall)		4	0	24.3	.545	–	.556	6.0	2.3	1.0	1.0	13.3

==== Playoffs ====
Year	Team	GP	MPG	FG%	3P%	FT%	RPG	APG	SPG	BPG	PPG
1966	S.L. Hawks	10	31.5	.462		.633	5.5	1.6			18.7
1967	S.L. Hawks	9	24.1	.400		**.667**	4.3	1.4			12.2
1968	S.L. Hawks	6	24.7	.326		.133	3.5	2.5			5.3
1969	Atlanta	11	36.7	.485		.464	5.0	3.4			14.7
1970	Atlanta	9	**43.7**	.470		.650	5.0	**4.2**			**25.0**
1973	Carolina (ABA)	**12**	38.9	**.491**	**.375**	.480	5.7	3.3			15.6
1974	Carolina (ABA)	4	26.3	.471	.000	.500	**6.8**	3.3	2.0	.0	9.5
Career (NBA)		45	32.8	.449		.560	4.8	2.6			15.9
Career (ABA)		16	35.8	.487	.300	.484	5.9	3.3	2.0	.0	14.1
Career (overall)		61	33.6	.458	.300	.544	5.1	2.8	2.0	.0	15.4

== Honors ==
- Caldwell's jersey #32 was retired by Arizona State University. On November 20, 2010, the ceremony took place before a game against the UAB Blazers.
- In 1975 Caldwell was a charter member of the Arizona State Hall of Fame.
- In 2005 Caldwell was inducted into the Pac-10 Hall of Fame.
