= "Bad News" Barnes =

"Bad News" Barnes may refer to:

- Jim "Bad News" Barnes (1941–2002), American basketball player in the NBA
- Marvin Barnes (1952–2014), American basketball player in the ABA, NBA, CBA and briefly in Italy
