= Larry Siegfried =

American basketball player (1939–2010)

Personal information
- Born: May 22, 1939 Shelby, Ohio, U.S.
- Died: October 14, 2010 (aged 71) Shelby, Ohio, U.S.
- Listed height: 6 ft 3 in (1.91 m)
- Listed weight: 190 lb (86 kg)

Career information
- High school: Shelby (Shelby, Ohio)
- College: Ohio State (1958–1961)
- NBA draft: 1961: 1st round, 3rd overall pick
- Drafted by: Cincinnati Royals
- Playing career: 1961–1972
- Position: Point guard
- Number: 20
- Coaching career: 1973–1977

Career history

Playing
- 1961–1962: Cleveland Pipers
- 1963–1970: Boston Celtics
- 1970–1971: San Diego / Houston Rockets
- 1971–1972: Atlanta Hawks

Coaching
- 1973–1977: Houston Rockets (assistant)

Career highlights
- 5× NBA champion (1964–1966, 1968, 1969); ABL champion (1962); NCAA champion (1960); Consensus second-team All-American (1961); First-team All-Big Ten (1961)

Career NBA statistics
- Points: 5,960 (10.8 ppg)
- Rebounds: 1,567 (2.8 rpg)
- Assists: 1,950 (3.5 apg)
- Stats at NBA.com
- Stats at Basketball Reference

Larry E. Siegfried (May 22, 1939 – October 14, 2010) was an American professional basketball player in the National Basketball Association (NBA).

== Early years ==
Siegfried led Ohio in scoring as a senior at Shelby High School.

Siegfried played college basketball for Ohio State University, and his tenure there overlapped with future Hall-of-Famers Jerry Lucas and John Havlicek. Siegfried, a junior high scoring guard, and Joe Roberts, a senior forward, were the two holdover starters when three outstanding sophomores, Lucas, Havlicek and guard Mel Nowell arrived for the 1959–60 season. Siegfried adjusted his scoring to allow for Lucas and Nowell while joining Roberts and Havlicek as a key defender. Siegfried was also an excellent free throw shooter few risked fouling. The Ohio State Co-Captain of the 1960 team, Siegfried played a key role in the Buckeyes run to the 1960 NCAA title. All five starters from that team later played in the NBA, which then had just nine teams and eleven players per team. Future coach Bobby Knight was a reserve on that team as well. Said Knight of Siegfried, "I never saw a better guard in the Big Ten than Larry Siegfried. He was a great player. He was tough as hell. He was physical, he could jump . . . if I had my choice of any guard who played in the Big Ten when I coached and everything else, I'd have a hard time picking someone else."

For the 1960–61 season, Siegfried was team captain outright. The team went undefeated until the NCAA Final, when they were upset by Cincinnati. Siegfried was named to the NCAA Final Four All-Tournament Team. Also named All-Big Ten, Siegfried did not get the All-American consideration he may have been due because of the star presence of Lucas. Siegfried did play in the 1960 US Olympic Trials for the Rome Games.

== Professional playing career ==
=== American Basketball League (1961–62) ===
==== Cleveland Pipers ABL Champs (1961–62) ====
At 6'3" and 190 pounds, Siegfried was considered a prototype guard for the NBA at that time. The Cincinnati Royals drafted him with their first pick in 1961 to pair with Oscar Robertson in their backcourt. Siegfried would not play in Cincinnati because of Ohio State's loss to Cincinnati's Bearcats that year. Instead, he joined the Cleveland Pipers of the American Basketball League. The team, owned by future New York Yankees owner George Steinbrenner, and coached by John McLendon and Bill Sharman, won that pro league's 1961–62 title. Dick Barnett and Connie Dierking were among that team's stars. The highly drafted Siegfried was just a reserve.

=== National Basketball Association (1960–71) ===
==== With perennial champion Boston Celtics (1963–70) ====
When the ABL folded the next year, the St. Louis Hawks acquired his rights but then surprisingly cut him. Siegfried considered retirement, becoming a high school coach and teacher before former college teammate Havlicek convinced coach Red Auerbach to try him out for the Boston Celtics. Slowly regaining his confidence, Siegfried proved to be a key pickup. He eventually became a starter next to Havlicek or Sam Jones in the backcourt. His defense and free throw shooting were key to NBA title wins for Boston in 1968 and 1969. Boston announcer Johnny Most often noted his tenacious defense, calling 'Ziggy's in his shirt tonight' to describe Siegfried on many nights.

Siegfried played his first seven professional seasons with the Boston Celtics, earning five championship rings during that time. He led the NBA in free throw percentage in both the 1965–66 and 1968–69 seasons.

==== Later NBA career (1970–72) ====
Siegfried spent the last season of his career with the Rockets and Hawks organizations.

== Post-playing life ==
Following his NBA career, Siegfried counseled prisoners at the Mansfield Correctional Institution in Ohio and did motivational speaking. He also served briefly as the Executive Director of the Central Ohio Chapter of The Associated Builders & Contractors (ABC). He died of a heart attack on October 14, 2010.

== NBA career statistics ==
Legend
GP	Games played	GS	Games started	MPG	Minutes per game
FG%	Field goal percentage	3P%	3-point field goal percentage	FT%	Free throw percentage
RPG	Rebounds per game	APG	Assists per game	SPG	Steals per game
BPG	Blocks per game	PPG	Points per game	**Bold**	Career high
†	Won an NBA championship	*	Led the league

=== Regular season ===
Year	Team	GP	MPG	FG%	FT%	RPG	APG	PPG
1963–64†	Boston	31	8.4	.318	.795	1.6	1.3	3.3
1964–65†	Boston	72	13.8	.415	.779	1.9	1.7	6.3
1965–66†	Boston	71	23.6	.423	**.881***	2.8	2.3	13.7
1966–67	Boston	73	25.9	**.442**	.847	3.1	3.4	14.1
1967–68†	Boston	62	31.2	.415	.868	3.5	4.7	12.2
1968–69†	Boston	**79**	**32.4**	.380	.864*	3.6	4.7	**14.2**
1969–70	Boston	78	26.7	.424	.856	2.7	3.8	12.6
1970–71	San Diego	53	31.6	.386	.850	**3.9**	**6.5**	8.0
1971–72	Houston	10	22.3	.391	.857	1.0	2.0	4.8
1971–72	Atlanta	21	16.0	.325	.870	1.5	2.5	3.3
Career		550	24.8	.409	.854	2.8	3.5	10.8

=== Playoffs ===
Year	Team	GP	MPG	FG%	FT%	RPG	APG	PPG
1964†	Boston	4	6.0	.333	.500	1.0	0.3	1.8
1965†	Boston	12	13.6	.380	.857	2.1	1.8	7.0
1966†	Boston	17	26.6	**.420**	.827	2.5	2.4	**13.2**
1967	Boston	9	**28.9**	.373	.814	**4.4**	**4.9**	12.3
1968†	Boston	**19**	28.2	.388	**.906***	2.6	2.9	12.3
1969†	Boston	18	21.8	.419	.786	2.1	2.6	11.1
Career		79	23.1	.400	.834	2.5	2.6	10.9
