= 1965–66 San Francisco Warriors season =

NBA team season

- Head coach: Alex Hannum
- Arena: San Francisco Civic Auditorium

Results
- Record: 35–45 (.438)
- Place: Division: 4th (Western)
- Playoff finish: Did not qualify
- Stats at Basketball Reference

The 1965–66 San Francisco Warriors season was the Warriors' 20th season in the NBA and 4th in the San Francisco Bay Area.

== Offseason ==
=== Draft picks ===
Round	Pick	Player	Position	Nationality	College
1	1	Fred Hetzel	F	United States	Davidson
1	2	Rick Barry	F	United States	Miami (FL)
2	9	Will Frazier	F/C	United States	Grambling State
3	18	Keith Erickson	F	United States	UCLA
4	27	Warren Rustand	G	United States	Arizona
5	36	Eddie Jackson		United States	Oklahoma City
6	45	Jim Jarvis	G	United States	Oregon State
7	54	Dan Wolters		United States	California
8	54	Willie Cotton		United States	Central State

== Roster ==
1965–66 San Francisco Warriors roster
Players

Pos.	No.	Player	Height	Weight	DOB	From
G	16	Al Attles	6 ft 0 in (1.83 m)	175 lb (79 kg)		North Carolina A&T
F	24	Rick Barry	6 ft 7 in (2.01 m)	205 lb (93 kg)		Miami (FL)
G/F	18	Keith Erickson	6 ft 5 in (1.96 m)	195 lb (88 kg)		UCLA
F	44	Fred Hetzel	6 ft 8 in (2.03 m)	220 lb (100 kg)		Davidson
F	32	McCoy McLemore	6 ft 7 in (2.01 m)	230 lb (104 kg)		Drake
F	14	Tom Meschery	6 ft 6 in (1.98 m)	215 lb (98 kg)		Saint Mary's
G	15	Paul Neumann	6 ft 1 in (1.85 m)	175 lb (79 kg)		Stanford
F	34	Bud Olsen	6 ft 8 in (2.03 m)	220 lb (100 kg)		Louisville
G	7	Gary Phillips	6 ft 3 in (1.91 m)	189 lb (86 kg)		Houston
G	5	Guy Rodgers	6 ft 0 in (1.83 m)	185 lb (84 kg)		Temple
F/C	42	Nate Thurmond	6 ft 11 in (2.11 m)	225 lb (102 kg)		Bowling Green

Coaches
Head coach
- Alex Hannum (USC)
Assistant(s)
- George Lee (Michigan)

Legend
- (DP) Unsigned draft pick
- (FA) Free agent
- (S) Suspended
- Injured

== Regular season ==
=== Season standings ===
Western Division	W	L	PCT	GB	Home	Road	Neutral	Div
x-Los Angeles Lakers	45	35	.563	–	28–11	13–21	4–3	29–11
x-Baltimore Bullets	38	42	.475	7	29–9	4–25	5–8	20–20
x-St. Louis Hawks	36	44	.450	9	22–10	6–22	8–12	19–21
San Francisco Warriors	35	45	.438	10	12–14	8–19	15–12	21–19
Detroit Pistons	22	58	.275	23	13–17	4–22	5–19	11–29

=== Game log ===
1965–66 Game log
#	Date	Opponent	Score	High points	Record
1	October 15	Los Angeles	122–115	Paul Neumann (26)	0–1
2	October 19	@ Cincinnati	100–99	Rick Barry (25)	1–1
3	October 23	@ Baltimore	123–108	Guy Rodgers (37)	2–1
4	October 29	New York	100–110	Guy Rodgers (24)	3–1
5	October 30	@ Los Angeles	124–122	Nate Thurmond (27)	4–1
6	October 31	New York	104–103	Rick Barry (33)	4–2
7	November 3	@ Cincinnati	108–122	Rick Barry (32)	4–3
8	November 4	N Philadelphia	121–119	Nate Thurmond (30)	5–3
9	November 5	@ Philadelphia	115–133	Rick Barry (25)	5–4
10	November 6	Detroit	100–110	Tom Meschery (26)	6–4
11	November 9	Detroit	102–107	Paul Neumann (23)	7–4
12	November 11	N Philadelphia	101–109	Rick Barry (32)	7–5
13	November 12	@ Detroit	103–102	Nate Thurmond (24)	8–5
14	November 13	@ St. Louis	113–138	Al Attles (16)	8–6
15	November 15	N Baltimore	123–112	Guy Rodgers (39)	9–6
16	November 16	Boston	108–105	Neumann, Rodgers (21)	9–7
17	November 19	@ Los Angeles	124–135	Guy Rodgers (47)	9–8
18	November 20	N Los Angeles	117–133	Guy Rodgers (23)	9–9
19	November 22	N St. Louis	108–112	Guy Rodgers (39)	10–9
20	November 23	@ New York	134–125	Guy Rodgers (46)	11–9
21	November 25	@ St. Louis	113–119	Guy Rodgers (37)	11–10
22	November 26	Philadelphia	132–120	Guy Rodgers (37)	11–11
23	November 27	Philadelphia	124–117	Tom Meschery (27)	11–12
24	December 2	N Cincinnati	125–119	Nate Thurmond (24)	12–12
25	December 5	N St. Louis	113–99	Rick Barry (30)	12–13
26	December 8	@ Detroit	113–115	Nate Thurmond (36)	12–14
27	December 9	N Cincinnati	110–109	Rick Barry (26)	13–14
28	December 10	@ Baltimore	127–145	Nate Thurmond (26)	13–15
29	December 11	@ Boston	106–143	Barry, Thurmond (19)	13–16
30	December 14	@ New York	137–141	Rick Barry (57)	13–17
31	December 15	N St. Louis	113–128	Guy Rodgers (37)	14–17
32	December 17	St. Louis	103–102	Rick Barry (23)	14–18
33	December 18	Philadelphia	120–116 (OT)	Guy Rodgers (26)	14–19
34	December 19	@ Los Angeles	120–132	Guy Rodgers (33)	14–20
35	December 20	Philadelphia	118–124	Rick Barry (37)	15–20
36	December 22	N Detroit	114–104	Barry, Thurmond (21)	16–20
37	December 25	@ Cincinnati	113–119	Guy Rodgers (24)	16–21
38	December 26	@ Philadelphia	107–121	Guy Rodgers (31)	16–22
39	December 28	N Detroit	120–107	Rick Barry (29)	17–22
40	December 29	@ Baltimore	111–144	Rick Barry (19)	17–23
41	December 30	N Boston	113–116	Guy Rodgers (23)	17–24
42	January 2	N Detroit	136–113	Rick Barry (43)	18–24
43	January 4	N Baltimore	122–111	Rick Barry (29)	19–24
44	January 5	N New York	118–117	Rick Barry (37)	20–24
45	January 7	Boston	115–114	Rick Barry (26)	20–25
46	January 8	Boston	124–96	Nate Thurmond (19)	20–26
47	January 12	New York	114–122	Tom Meschery (22)	21–26
48	January 14	Los Angeles	118–110	Guy Rodgers (33)	21–27
49	January 21	@ Los Angeles	120–109	Nate Thurmond (36)	22–27
50	January 24	N Cincinnati	112–135	Rick Barry (31)	22–28
51	January 25	@ St. Louis	107–142	Fred Hetzel (27)	22–29
52	January 26	N New York	103–115	Rick Barry (25)	22–30
53	January 28	@ St. Louis	114–104	Rick Barry (38)	23–30
54	January 29	Baltimore	95–108	Rick Barry (38)	24–30
55	January 31	Baltimore	118–131	Rick Barry (29)	25–30
56	February 1	Cincinnati	125–127	Rick Barry (37)	26–30
57	February 6	N Cincinnati	116–117	Rick Barry (43)	26–31
58	February 7	N Boston	107–112	Rick Barry (31)	26–32
59	February 8	N Detroit	113–103	Rick Barry (36)	27–32
60	February 10	N Boston	128–117	Rick Barry (36)	28–32
61	February 11	@ Boston	96–99	Nate Thurmond (34)	28–33
62	February 12	@ Baltimore	127–136	Rick Barry (34)	28–34
63	February 14	N New York	125–138	Paul Neumann (26)	28–35
64	February 16	N New York	108–112	Rick Barry (21)	28–36
65	February 18	Boston	106–128	Rick Barry (33)	29–36
66	February 19	Philadelphia	123–119	Rick Barry (40)	29–37
67	February 22	Boston	116–108	Rick Barry (32)	29–38
68	February 25	Cincinnati	119–125	Rick Barry (42)	30–38
69	February 26	Cincinnati	112–103	Rick Barry (31)	30–39
70	March 1	@ New York	114–112	Rick Barry (27)	31–39
71	March 2	@ Detroit	118–131	Rick Barry (21)	31–40
72	March 3	@ Philadelphia	125–135	Fred Hetzel (35)	31–41
73	March 5	Los Angeles	125–123	Rick Barry (29)	31–42
74	March 8	N Baltimore	109–130	Rick Barry (25)	31–43
75	March 9	N Baltimore	125–115	Rick Barry (26)	32–43
76	March 13	N Detroit	121–119	Guy Rodgers (24)	33–43
77	March 15	N St. Louis	110–109	Rick Barry (41)	33–44
78	March 17	St. Louis	112–116	Rick Barry (39)	34–44
79	March 19	Los Angeles	119–125	Rick Barry (43)	35–44
80	March 20	@ Los Angeles	112–124	Rick Barry (31)	35–45

== Awards and records ==
- Nate Thurmond, NBA All-Star Game
- Rick Barry, NBA All-Star Game
- Rick Barry, NBA Rookie of the Year Award
- Rick Barry, All-NBA First Team
- Rick Barry, NBA All-Rookie Team 1st Team
- Fred Hetzel, NBA All-Rookie Team 1st Team
