= 1964 United States men's Olympic basketball team =

- Head coach: Hank Iba
- Scoring leader: (United States) Jerry Shipp (12.4)

The 1964 United States men's Olympic basketball team represented the United States at the 1964 Summer Olympics in Tokyo, Japan. Entering the Olympics for the sixth time, the United States men's team had won its last 37 games in a row. In the gold medal game, the USA faced the USSR; they were two undefeated teams that were both favorites to win the gold medal. Team USA won the gold medal for the sixth Olympics in a row, by beating the USSR, 73–59.

== Roster ==
Name	Position	Height	Weight	Age	Team/School	Home Town
Jim Barnes	C	6'8"	240	23	Texas Western College	Stillwater, Oklahoma
Bill Bradley	G/F	6'5"	205	21	Princeton University	Crystal City, Missouri
Larry Brown	G	5'10"	165	24	Goodyear Wingfoots	Long Beach, New York
Joe Caldwell	G/F	6'5"	195	22	Arizona State University	Los Angeles, California
Mel Counts	C	7'0"	230	23	Oregon State University	Coos Bay, Oregon
Dick Davies	G	6'1"	175	28	Goodyear Wingfoots (LSU)	Harrisburg, Pennsylvania
Walt Hazzard	G/F	6'3"	188	22	Univ. of California-Los Angeles	Philadelphia, Pennsylvania
Lucious Jackson	F	6'9"	238	22	Pan American University	Bastrop, Louisiana
Pete McCaffrey	F	6'5"	190	25	Goodyear Wingfoots (LSU)	Tulsa, Oklahoma
Jeff Mullins	G/F	6'4"	185	22	Duke University	Lexington, Kentucky
Jerry Shipp	G	6'5"	190	29	Phillips 66ers (SE Oklahoma St.)	Blue, Oklahoma
George Wilson	F	6'8"	210	22	Chicago Jamaco Saints (Cincinnati)	Chicago, Illinois

The 1964 United States Olympic basketball team featured college and AAU players. Jerry Shipp led the team with an average of 12.4 points per game.

== Results ==
- United States beat Australia, 78–45
- United States beat Finland, 77–51
- United States beat Peru, 60–45
- United States beat Uruguay, 83–28
- United States beat Yugoslavia, 69–61
- United States beat Brazil, 86–53
- United States beat South Korea, 116–50
- United States beat Puerto Rico, 62–42 (semifinals)
- United States beat Soviet Union, 73–59 (gold-medal game)

== 1964 Olympic standings ==
- 1. United States (9–0)
- 2. Soviet Union (8–1)
- 3. Brazil (6–3)
- 4. Puerto Rico (5–4)
- 5. Italy (6–3)
- 6. Poland (5–4)
- 7. Yugoslavia (6–3)
- 8. Uruguay (4–5)
- 9. Australia (4–5)
- 10. Japan (4–5)
- 11. Finland (4–5)
- 12. Mexico (3–6)
- 13. Hungary (4–5)
- 14. Canada (1–8)
- 15. Peru (3–6)
- 16. South Korea (0–9)
