= 1965–66 Baltimore Bullets season =

NBA professional basketball team season

- Head coach: Paul Seymour
- General manager: Buddy Jeannette
- Owner: Abe Pollin
- Arena: Baltimore Civic Center

Results
- Record: 38–42 (.475)
- Place: Division: 2nd (Western)
- Playoff finish: Division semifinals (lost to Hawks 0–3)
- Stats at Basketball Reference

Local media
- Television: none
- Radio: WBAL

The 1965–66 Baltimore Bullets season was the Bullets' 5th season in the NBA and 3rd season in the city of Baltimore.

== Roster ==
1965–66 Baltimore Bullets roster
Players

Pos.	No.	Player	Height	Weight	DOB	From
PF	41	Jim "Bad News" Barnes	6 ft 8 in (2.03 m)	210 lb (95 kg)	April 13, 1941	Texas Western College
C	8	Walt Bellamy	6 ft 11 in (2.11 m)	225 lb (102 kg)	1939-07-24	Indiana
SF	33	Gary Bradds	6 ft 8 in (2.03 m)	210 lb (95 kg)	1942-07-26	Ohio State
PG	11	Johnny Egan	5 ft 11 in (1.80 m)	180 lb (82 kg)	January 31, 1939	Providence
PF	12	Bob Ferry	6 ft 8 in (2.03 m)	230 lb (104 kg)	1937-05-31	Saint Louis
PF	24	Johnny Green	6 ft 5 in (1.96 m)	200 lb (91 kg)	December 8, 1933	Michigan State
PF	20	Wayne Hightower	6 ft 8 in (2.03 m)	192 lb (87 kg)	1940-01-14	Kansas
PF	15	Bailey Howell	6 ft 7 in (2.01 m)	210 lb (95 kg)	1937-01-20	Mississippi State
PF	25	Gus Johnson	6 ft 6 in (1.98 m)	230 lb (104 kg)	1938-12-13	Idaho
C	43	Red Kerr	6 ft 9 in (2.06 m)	230 lb (104 kg)	July 17, 1932	Illinois
SG	22	Kevin Loughery	6 ft 3 in (1.91 m)	190 lb (86 kg)	March 28, 1940	St. John's
G	11	Thales McReynolds	6 ft 3 in (1.91 m)	185 lb (84 kg)	June 8, 1943	Miles
PG	10	Don Ohl	6 ft 3 in (1.91 m)	190 lb (86 kg)	April 18, 1936	Illinois
SG	14	Jerry Sloan	6 ft 5 in (1.96 m)	195 lb (88 kg)	March 28, 1942	Evansville
PG	24	Willie Somerset	5 ft 8 in (1.73 m)	170 lb (77 kg)	March 17, 1942	Duquesne
SF	33	Ben Warley	6 ft 5 in (1.96 m)	200 lb (91 kg)	September 4, 1936	Tennessee State

Coaches
Head coach
- Paul Seymour

Legend
- (DP) Unsigned draft pick
- (FA) Free agent
- (S) Suspended
- Injured

Roster

== Regular season ==
=== Season standings ===
Western Division	W	L	PCT	GB	Home	Road	Neutral	Div
x-Los Angeles Lakers	45	35	.563	–	28–11	13–21	4–3	29–11
x-Baltimore Bullets	38	42	.475	7	29–9	4–25	5–8	20–20
x-St. Louis Hawks	36	44	.450	9	22–10	6–22	8–12	19–21
San Francisco Warriors	35	45	.438	10	12–14	8–19	15–12	21–19
Detroit Pistons	22	58	.275	23	13–17	4–22	5–19	11–29

=== Game log ===
1965–66 game log
#	Date	Opponent	Score	High points	Record
1	October 16	Philadelphia	133–101	Don Ohl (27)	0–1
2	October 17	@ Cincinnati	124–144	Don Ohl (34)	0–2
3	October 20	St. Louis	99–119	Don Ohl (26)	1–2
4	October 23	San Francisco	123–108	Bailey Howell (29)	1–3
5	October 26	@ Detroit	117–98	Don Ohl (27)	2–3
6	October 27	Detroit	108–107	Walt Bellamy (34)	2–4
7	October 29	Cincinnati	131–121	Bailey Howell (32)	2–5
8	October 31	@ Boston	100–105	Don Ohl (33)	2–6
9	November 3	New York	114–129	Don Ohl (20)	3–6
10	November 4	@ New York	107–108	Don Ohl (23)	3–7
11	November 5	Boston	129–118	Barnes, Ohl (25)	3–8
12	November 7	Los Angeles	116–137	Jim Barnes (30)	4–8
13	November 9	N Boston	130–116	Don Ohl (25)	4–9
14	November 10	St. Louis	117–124	Johnny Green (23)	5–9
15	November 13	@ Cincinnati	132–135	Don Ohl (28)	5–10
16	November 14	@ Los Angeles	114–129	Ben Warley (21)	5–11
17	November 15	N San Francisco	123–112	Bailey Howell (24)	5–12
18	November 18	New York	104–120	Don Ohl (32)	6–12
19	November 19	@ Philadelphia	134–124	Don Ohl (31)	7–12
20	November 20	Philadelphia	112–117	Don Ohl (32)	8–12
21	November 21	N Cincinnati	120–114	Don Ohl (26)	8–13
22	November 25	@ Detroit	124–130	Don Ohl (32)	8–14
23	November 26	Los Angeles	107–110	Kevin Loughery (28)	9–14
24	November 27	@ St. Louis	110–136	Johnny Kerr (30)	9–15
25	November 28	St. Louis	102–110	Don Ohl (27)	10–15
26	November 30	N Philadelphia	108–129	Bailey Howell (40)	11–15
27	December 1	N New York	125–139	Johnny Kerr (26)	12–15
28	December 4	@ Detroit	119–130	Johnny Kerr (36)	12–16
29	December 8	Philadelphia	127–129	Bailey Howell (31)	13–16
30	December 10	San Francisco	127–145	Don Ohl (30)	14–16
31	December 11	@ New York	127–150	Kevin Loughery (24)	14–17
32	December 14	N Detroit	129–142	Kevin Loughery (35)	15–17
33	December 15	New York	108–111	Don Ohl (24)	16–17
34	December 18	Detroit	114–143	Kevin Loughery (28)	17–17
35	December 22	Cincinnati	127–129 (OT)	Kevin Loughery (34)	18–17
36	December 25	Boston	113–99	Bailey Howell (23)	18–18
37	December 26	@ Boston	99–120	Green, Howell (18)	18–19
38	December 29	San Francisco	111–144	Don Ohl (28)	19–19
39	January 1	Detroit	112–116	Don Ohl (30)	20–19
40	January 2	@ Cincinnati	107–138	Gus Johnson (28)	20–20
41	January 4	N San Francisco	122–111	Gus Johnson (32)	20–21
42	January 5	St. Louis	101–114	Bailey Howell (21)	21–21
43	January 6	N Philadelphia	133–127	Gus Johnson (25)	21–22
44	January 8	Cincinnati	126–115	Bailey Howell (25)	21–23
45	January 9	New York	124–130	Jim Barnes (28)	22–23
46	January 14	@ St. Louis	121–119	Kevin Loughery (30)	23–23
47	January 15	@ Detroit	117–122	Jim Barnes (25)	23–24
48	January 16	@ St. Louis	128–136	Kevin Loughery (23)	23–25
49	January 18	@ Philadelphia	117–128	Don Ohl (32)	23–26
50	January 19	@ Boston	89–129	Johnny Green (21)	23–27
51	January 20	Los Angeles	121–123	Johnson, Kerr (26)	24–27
52	January 22	Boston	107–132	Kevin Loughery (36)	25–27
53	January 28	@ Los Angeles	123–138	Johnson, Loughery (21)	25–28
54	January 29	@ San Francisco	95–108	Don Ohl (25)	25–29
55	January 30	@ Los Angeles	122–136	Kevin Loughery (34)	25–30
56	January 31	@ San Francisco	118–131	Kevin Loughery (31)	25–31
57	February 1	@ New York	109–112	Kevin Loughery (31)	25–32
58	February 3	St. Louis	113–122	Egan, Loughery (25)	26–32
59	February 5	Boston	94–113	Gus Johnson (26)	27–32
60	February 7	N St. Louis	104–111	Kevin Loughery (26)	28–32
61	February 8	@ Cincinnati	113–128	Howell, Johnson (27)	28–33
62	February 9	Los Angeles	123–116 (OT)	Gus Johnson (21)	28–34
63	February 12	San Francisco	127–136	Johnny Egan (30)	29–34
64	February 15	Detroit	105–114	Don Ohl (24)	30–34
65	February 18	Cincinnati	114–118	Don Ohl (24)	31–34
66	February 20	@ St. Louis	123–126	Loughery, Ohl (22)	31–35
67	February 23	Philadelphia	115–119	Don Ohl (23)	32–35
68	February 26	N Philadelphia	114–98	Kevin Loughery (25)	32–36
69	February 27	Boston	92–132	Johnny Green (24)	33–36
70	March 1	N Detroit	122–118	Kevin Loughery (21)	33–37
71	March 2	Los Angeles	113–119	Gus Johnson (28)	34–37
72	March 4	@ Los Angeles	106–123	Bailey Howell (24)	34–38
73	March 6	@ Los Angeles	105–126	Johnny Egan (21)	34–39
74	March 8	N San Francisco	109–130	Johnny Green (25)	35–39
75	March 9	N San Francisco	125–115	Bailey Howell (26)	35–40
76	March 11	@ New York	126–123	Kevin Loughery (28)	36–40
77	March 13	@ Boston	98–129	Johnny Green (28)	36–41
78	March 16	New York	113–118	Don Ohl (39)	37–41
79	March 18	Cincinnati	105–125	Bailey Howell (31)	38–41
80	March 20	Philadelphia	108–104	Don Ohl (33)	38–42

== Playoffs ==
1966 playoff game log
Division semifinals: 0–3 (home: 0–2; road: 0–1)

Game	Date	Team	Score	High points	High rebounds	High assists	Location Attendance	Series
1	March 24	St. Louis	L 111–113	Don Ohl (38)	Green, Howell (11)	Johnny Egan (9)	Baltimore Civic Center; 3,587	0–1
2	March 27	St. Louis	L 100–105	Jim Barnes (27)	Bob Ferry (17)	Johnny Egan (8)	Baltimore Civic Center; 13,104	0–2
3	March 30	@ St. Louis	L 112–121	Don Ohl (32)	Bailey Howell (12)	Johnny Egan (6)	Kiel Auditorium; 7,135	0–3

1966 schedule

== Awards and records ==
- Gus Johnson, All-NBA Second Team
