= 1965–66 New York Knicks season =

Season of National Basketball Association team the New York Knicks

- Head coach: Dick McGuire
- General manager: Eddie Donovan
- Arena: Madison Square Garden

Results
- Record: 30–50 (.375)
- Place: Division: 4th (Eastern)
- Playoff finish: Did not qualify
- Stats at Basketball Reference

Local media
- Television: WOR-TV
- Radio: WNBC

The 1965–66 New York Knicks season was the Knicks' 20th season in the NBA.

== Regular season ==
=== Season standings ===
Eastern Division	W	L	PCT	GB	Home	Road	Neutral	Div
x-Philadelphia 76ers	55	25	.688	–	22–3	20–17	13–5	20–10
x-Boston Celtics	54	26	.675	1	26–5	19–18	9–3	19–11
x-Cincinnati Royals	45	35	.563	10	25–6	11–23	9–6	16–14
New York Knicks	30	50	.375	25	20–14	4–30	6–6	5–25

x – clinched playoff spot

=== Game log ===
1965–66 game log
#	Date	Opponent	Score	High points	Record
1	October 16	Detroit	103–111	Dick Barnett (27)	1–0
2	October 20	@ Detroit	103–116	Jim Barnes (21)	1–1
3	October 23	Los Angeles	101–106	Johnny Green (25)	2–1
4	October 26	@ Los Angeles	102–104	Dick Barnett (28)	2–2
5	October 28	@ Los Angeles	116–140	Howard Komives (16)	2–3
6	October 29	@ San Francisco	100–110	Willis Reed (18)	2–4
7	October 31	@ San Francisco	104–103	Dick Barnett (30)	3–4
8	November 3	@ Baltimore	114–129	Dick Barnett (29)	3–5
9	November 4	Baltimore	107–108	Dick Barnett (33)	4–5
10	November 6	Cincinnati	114–103	Walt Bellamy (30)	4–6
11	November 10	@ Cincinnati	119–124	Dick Barnett (35)	4–7
12	November 12	N Los Angeles	106–107	Dick Barnett (31)	4–8
13	November 13	Philadelphia	127–119	Dick Barnett (27)	4–9
14	November 16	Detroit	95–120	Dick Barnett (40)	5–9
15	November 18	@ Baltimore	104–120	Willis Reed (30)	5–10
16	November 19	@ Detroit	116–109	Dick Barnett (29)	6–10
17	November 20	Boston	122–108	Dick Barnett (39)	6–11
18	November 23	San Francisco	134–125	Dick Barnett (41)	6–12
19	November 24	@ Boston	110–125	Willis Reed (27)	6–13
20	November 26	@ Cincinnati	113–117	Willis Reed (30)	6–14
21	November 27	Cincinnati	132–129	Willis Reed (40)	6–15
22	November 30	St. Louis	119–138	Dick Barnett (36)	7–15
23	December 1	N Baltimore	125–139	Dick Barnett (38)	7–16
24	December 7	Los Angeles	127–131	Dick Barnett (38)	8–16
25	December 8	N St. Louis	104–93	Dick Barnett (22)	8–17
26	December 10	@ St. Louis	109–106	Dick Barnett (36)	9–17
27	December 11	Baltimore	127–150	Dick Barnett (34)	10–17
28	December 14	San Francisco	137–141	Walt Bellamy (31)	11–17
29	December 15	@ Baltimore	108–111	Dick Barnett (33)	11–18
30	December 18	Cincinnati	114–122	Dick Barnett (34)	12–18
31	December 22	@ Boston	120–123 (OT)	Walt Bellamy (29)	12–19
32	December 25	St. Louis	131–111	Dick Barnett (24)	12–20
33	December 27	@ Cincinnati	116–138	Dick Barnett (29)	12–21
34	December 29	Boston	99–96	Stallworth, Van Arsdale (20)	12–22
35	January 1	Cincinnati	122–147	Barnett, Reed (36)	13–22
36	January 2	@ Philadelphia	122–133	Walt Bellamy (36)	13–23
37	January 4	Philadelphia	129–127	Dick Barnett (31)	13–24
38	January 5	N San Francisco	118–117	Dick Barnett (32)	13–25
39	January 8	Los Angeles	127–133	Walt Bellamy (44)	14–25
40	January 9	@ Baltimore	124–130	Dick Van Arsdale (27)	14–26
41	January 12	@ San Francisco	114–122	Dick Barnett (20)	14–27
42	January 15	@ Los Angeles	123–152	Walt Bellamy (22)	14–28
43	January 17	N St. Louis	115–106	Dick Barnett (20)	14–29
44	January 18	@ St. Louis	107–109	Dick Barnett (30)	14–30
45	January 21	@ Philadelphia	98–109	Walt Bellamy (17)	14–31
46	January 22	@ St. Louis	111–119	Dick Barnett (33)	14–32
47	January 25	Detroit	100–115	Dave Stallworth (26)	15–32
48	January 26	N San Francisco	103–115	Tom Gola (20)	16–32
49	January 29	Boston	119–107	Walt Bellamy (32)	16–33
50	January 30	@ Boston	115–118	Walt Bellamy (26)	16–34
51	February 1	Baltimore	109–112	Walt Bellamy (37)	17–34
52	February 4	@ Detroit	115–113	Walt Bellamy (28)	18–34
53	February 5	Philadelphia	113–120	Dick Barnett (23)	19–34
54	February 8	Philadelphia	123–136	Walt Bellamy (23)	20–34
55	February 9	@ Boston	117–121	Dick Barnett (32)	20–35
56	February 11	N Detroit	122–107	Walt Bellamy (24)	21–35
57	February 12	Los Angeles	127–140	Walt Bellamy (30)	22–35
58	February 14	N San Francisco	125–138	Dick Barnett (32)	23–35
59	February 15	@ Los Angeles	124–132	Barnett, Bellamy (30)	23–36
60	February 16	N San Francisco	108–112	Howard Komives (22)	24–36
61	February 18	@ Detroit	118–120	Dick Barnett (31)	24–37
62	February 19	Cincinnati	113–124	Walt Bellamy (37)	25–37
63	February 22	St. Louis	108–113	Bellamy, Reed (24)	26–37
64	February 23	N Detroit	100–98	Walt Bellamy (19)	27–37
65	February 25	@ Philadelphia	124–130	Walt Bellamy (27)	27–38
66	February 26	Boston	100–95	Walt Bellamy (31)	27–39
67	March 1	San Francisco	114–112	Walt Bellamy (29)	27–40
68	March 2	@ Boston	104–140	Walt Bellamy (27)	27–41
69	March 4	N Detroit	121–119	Howard Komives (37)	28–41
70	March 5	@ Cincinnati	145–149 (OT)	Dave Stallworth (34)	28–42
71	March 6	@ St. Louis	106–119	Dave Stallworth (25)	28–43
72	March 8	Los Angeles	132–133 (OT)	Walt Bellamy (40)	29–43
73	March 11	Baltimore	126–123	Walt Bellamy (27)	29–44
74	March 12	@ Philadelphia	126–134	Walt Bellamy (39)	29–45
75	March 13	Philadelphia	115–113	Howard Komives (32)	29–46
76	March 15	N Cincinnati	107–125	Walt Bellamy (20)	29–47
77	March 16	@ Baltimore	113–118	Howard Komives (24)	29–48
78	March 17	@ Philadelphia	106–115	Walt Bellamy (22)	29–49
79	March 19	Boston	126–113	Dave Stallworth (23)	29–50
80	March 22	St. Louis	125–126	Dick Van Arsdale (24)	30–50

== Awards and records ==
Dick Van Arsdale, NBA All-Rookie Team 1st Team
