= 1965–66 Los Angeles Lakers season =

NBA professional basketball team season

- Division champions
- Head coach: Fred Schaus
- Arena: Los Angeles Memorial Sports Arena

Results
- Record: 45–35 (.563)
- Place: Division: 1st (Western)
- Playoff finish: NBA Finals (lost to Celtics 3–4)
- Stats at Basketball Reference

Local media
- Television: KTTV
- Radio: KNX

== Roster ==
1965–66 Los Angeles Lakers roster
Players

Pos.	No.	Player	Height	Weight	DOB	From
SF	22	Elgin Baylor	6 ft 5 in (1.96 m)	225 lb (102 kg)	1934-09-16	Seattle
PF	15	Bob Boozer	6 ft 8 in (2.03 m)	215 lb (98 kg)	1937-04-26	Kansas State
C	25	LeRoy Ellis	6 ft 11 in (2.11 m)	210 lb (95 kg)	1940-03-10	St. John's
SF	33	John Fairchild	6 ft 8 in (2.03 m)	205 lb (93 kg)	1943-04-28	BYU
SG	11	Gail Goodrich	6 ft 1 in (1.85 m)	170 lb (77 kg)	1943-04-23	UCLA
SG	42	Walt Hazzard	6 ft 2 in (1.88 m)	185 lb (84 kg)	1942-04-15	UCLA
C	14	Darrall Imhoff	6 ft 10 in (2.08 m)	220 lb (100 kg)	1938-10-11	California
PG	21	Jim King	6 ft 2 in (1.88 m)	175 lb (79 kg)	1941-02-07	Tulsa
PF	35	Rudy LaRusso	6 ft 8 in (2.03 m)	220 lb (100 kg)	1937-11-11	Dartmouth
PG	44	Jerry West	6 ft 3 in (1.91 m)	175 lb (79 kg)	1938-05-28	West Virginia
C	12	Gene Wiley	6 ft 10 in (2.08 m)	210 lb (95 kg)	1937-11-12	Wichita State

Coaches
Head coach
- Fred Schaus

Legend
- (DP) Unsigned draft pick
- (FA) Free agent
- (S) Suspended
- Injured

Roster
Updated: February 1, 1966

== Regular season ==
=== Season standings ===
Western Division	W	L	PCT	GB	Home	Road	Neutral	Div
x-Los Angeles Lakers	45	35	.563	–	28–11	13–21	4–3	29–11
x-Baltimore Bullets	38	42	.475	7	29–9	4–25	5–8	20–20
x-St. Louis Hawks	36	44	.450	9	22–10	6–22	8–12	19–21
San Francisco Warriors	35	45	.438	10	12–14	8–19	15–12	21–19
Detroit Pistons	22	58	.275	23	13–17	4–22	5–19	11–29

=== Game log ===
1965–66 game log
#	Date	Opponent	Score	High points	Record
1	October 15	@ San Francisco	122–115	Jerry West (36)	1–0
2	October 16	@ St. Louis	106–94	Jerry West (27)	2–0
3	October 20	@ Boston	96–100	Jerry West (24)	2–1
4	October 23	@ New York	101–106	Jerry West (31)	2–2
5	October 26	New York	102–104	Jerry West (31)	3–2
6	October 28	New York	116–140	Jerry West (25)	4–2
7	October 30	San Francisco	124–122	Jerry West (44)	4–3
8	November 3	St. Louis	116–120	Jerry West (38)	5–3
9	November 5	St. Louis	116–118	Jerry West (26)	6–3
10	November 6	@ St. Louis	101–131	Jerry West (21)	6–4
11	November 7	@ Baltimore	116–137	Jerry West (26)	6–5
12	November 9	@ Philadelphia	110–118	Jerry West (32)	6–6
13	November 10	Detroit	125–133	Jerry West (40)	7–6
14	November 12	N New York	106–107	Jerry West (29)	8–6
15	November 14	Baltimore	114–129	Elgin Baylor (30)	9–6
16	November 17	Boston	115–125	Jerry West (46)	10–6
17	November 19	San Francisco	124–135	Jerry West (35)	11–6
18	November 20	N San Francisco	117–133	Jerry West (34)	12–6
19	November 21	Philadelphia	110–104	Jerry West (29)	12–7
20	November 24	Philadelphia	124–127	Jerry West (33)	13–7
21	November 26	@ Baltimore	107–110	Jerry West (39)	13–8
22	November 27	@ Boston	95–101	LaRusso, West (21)	13–9
23	November 28	@ Detroit	128–110	Jerry West (28)	14–9
24	November 30	@ Cincinnati	120–126	Jerry West (28)	14–10
25	December 1	Cincinnati	105–121	Jerry West (41)	15–10
26	December 3	Cincinnati	122–118	Jerry West (51)	15–11
27	December 6	N Philadelphia	116–107	Jerry West (34)	15–12
28	December 7	@ New York	127–131	Jerry West (46)	15–13
29	December 8	@ Boston	106–108	Boozer, Hazzard (23)	15–14
30	December 10	@ Cincinnati	129–110	Jerry West (51)	16–14
31	December 11	St. Louis	108–126	Jerry West (32)	17–14
32	December 12	St. Louis	101–123	Jerry West (33)	18–14
33	December 15	Philadelphia	122–108	Jerry West (27)	18–15
34	December 17	Philadelphia	127–117	Jerry West (39)	18–16
35	December 19	San Francisco	120–132	Jerry West (39)	19–16
36	December 23	Detroit	112–122	Goodrich, West (25)	20–16
37	December 25	Detroit	106–115	Jerry West (44)	21–16
38	December 27	N St. Louis	100–108	Jerry West (24)	22–16
39	December 28	@ St. Louis	107–100	Jerry West (37)	23–16
40	December 29	@ Cincinnati	109–111	Jerry West (42)	23–17
41	December 30	N Detroit	114–117	Jerry West (34)	23–18
42	January 2	Boston	124–113	Jerry West (29)	23–19
43	January 5	Boston	113–120	Jerry West (29)	24–19
44	January 7	@ Philadelphia	126–120	Jerry West (37)	25–19
45	January 8	@ New York	127–133	Jerry West (36)	25–20
46	January 9	@ Detroit	111–98	Jerry West (30)	26–20
47	January 12	@ Boston	102–114	Baylor, Hazzard (21)	26–21
48	January 14	@ San Francisco	118–110	Jerry West (33)	27–21
49	January 15	New York	123–152	Rudy LaRusso (27)	28–21
50	January 18	@ Cincinnati	108–119	Jerry West (22)	28–22
51	January 20	@ Baltimore	121–123	Jerry West (37)	28–23
52	January 21	San Francisco	120–109	Jerry West (38)	28–24
53	January 25	N Philadelphia	110–106	Jerry West (26)	28–25
54	January 26	@ Detroit	126–110	Jerry West (35)	29–25
55	January 28	Baltimore	123–138	Walt Hazzard (27)	30–25
56	January 30	Baltimore	122–136	Walt Hazzard (28)	31–25
57	February 2	Cincinnati	118–119	Elgin Baylor (29)	32–25
58	February 4	Cincinnati	125–132	Jerry West (36)	33–25
59	February 6	@ St. Louis	105–109	Elgin Baylor (20)	33–26
60	February 7	@ Philadelphia	125–132	Jerry West (22)	33–27
61	February 9	@ Baltimore	123–116 (OT)	Jerry West (39)	34–27
62	February 12	@ New York	127–140	Rudy LaRusso (31)	34–28
63	February 13	@ Boston	120–110	Rudy LaRusso (26)	35–28
64	February 15	New York	124–132	Jerry West (29)	36–28
65	February 17	Philadelphia	136–121	Jerry West (23)	36–29
66	February 19	Boston	115–111	LaRusso, West (23)	36–30
67	February 21	Boston	115–108	Baylor, Ellis (23)	36–31
68	February 23	Cincinnati	133–140	Elgin Baylor (35)	37–31
69	February 26	@ Detroit	131–118	Jerry West (44)	38–31
70	March 2	@ Baltimore	113–119	Jerry West (33)	38–32
71	March 4	Baltimore	106–123	Jerry West (38)	39–32
72	March 5	@ San Francisco	125–123	Walt Hazzard (30)	40–32
73	March 6	Baltimore	105–126	Elgin Baylor (37)	41–32
74	March 8	@ New York	132–133 (OT)	Elgin Baylor (46)	41–33
75	March 9	N Cincinnati	119–116	Jerry West (31)	42–33
76	March 11	Detroit	116–114	Jerry West (27)	42–34
77	March 15	Detroit	108–135	Elgin Baylor (30)	43–34
78	March 18	St. Louis	120–132	Jerry West (28)	44–34
79	March 19	@ San Francisco	119–125	Jerry West (29)	44–35
80	March 20	San Francisco	112–124	Jerry West (35)	45–35

== Playoffs ==
1966 playoff game log
Division finals: 4–3 (home: 3–1; road: 1–2)

Game	Date	Team	Score	High points	High rebounds	High assists	Location Attendance	Series
1	April 1	St. Louis	W 129–106	Jerry West (28)	Elgin Baylor (15)	Jerry West (12)	Los Angeles Memorial Sports Arena; 11,509	1–0
2	April 3	St. Louis	W 125–116	Elgin Baylor (42)	Elgin Baylor (14)	Elgin Baylor (9)	Los Angeles Memorial Sports Arena; 14,896	2–0
3	April 6	@ St. Louis	L 113–120	Jerry West (32)	Jerry West (11)	Jerry West (8)	Kiel Auditorium; 8,318	2–1
4	April 9	@ St. Louis	W 107–95	Jerry West (42)	Elgin Baylor (13)	three players tied (4)	Kiel Auditorium; 9,569	3–1
5	April 10	St. Louis	L 100–112	Jerry West (31)	Elgin Baylor (17)	Elgin Baylor (4)	Los Angeles Memorial Sports Arena; 14,297	3–2
6	April 13	@ St. Louis	L 131–127	Jerry West (38)	Elgin Baylor (13)	West, Hazzard (5)	Kiel Auditorium; 8,614	3–3
7	April 15	St. Louis	W 130–121	Jerry West (35)	Elgin Baylor (11)	Baylor, LaRusso (7)	Los Angeles Memorial Sports Arena; 15,200	4–3

NBA Finals: 3–4 (home: 1–2; road: 2–2)

Game	Date	Team	Score	High points	High rebounds	High assists	Location Attendance	Series
1	April 17	@ Boston	W 133–129 (OT)	Jerry West (41)	Elgin Baylor (20)	Gail Goodrich (5)	Boston Garden; 13,909	1–0
2	April 19	@ Boston	L 109–129	Jerry West (18)	Elgin Baylor (14)	Walt Hazzard (5)	Boston Garden; 13,909	1–1
3	April 20	Boston	L 106–120	Jerry West (34)	Elgin Baylor (15)	Jim King (6)	Los Angeles Memorial Sports Arena; 15,101	1–2
4	April 22	Boston	L 117–122	Jerry West (45)	Elgin Baylor (12)	Jerry West (10)	Los Angeles Memorial Sports Arena; 15,251	1–3
5	April 24	@ Boston	W 121–117	Elgin Baylor (41)	Elgin Baylor (16)	Jerry West (5)	Boston Garden; 13,909	2–3
6	April 26	Boston	W 123–115	Jerry West (32)	Elgin Baylor (14)	Jerry West (7)	Los Angeles Memorial Sports Arena; 15,069	3–3
7	April 28	@ Boston	L 93–95	Jerry West (36)	Elgin Baylor (14)	West, Hazzard (3)	Boston Garden; 13,909	3–4

1966 schedule

== Awards and records ==
=== Awards ===
- Jerry West, All-NBA First Team
- Jerry West, NBA All-Star Game
- Rudy LaRusso, NBA All-Star Game
