= Jim "Bad News" Barnes =

American basketball player (1941–2002)

Jim Barnes
Personal information
- Born: April 13, 1941 Tuckerman, Arkansas, U.S.
- Died: September 14, 2002 (aged 61) Silver Spring, Maryland, U.S.
- Listed height: 6 ft 8 in (2.03 m)
- Listed weight: 210 lb (95 kg)

Career information
- High school: Stillwater (Stillwater, Oklahoma)
- College: Cameron (1960–1962); Texas Western (1962–1964)
- NBA draft: 1964: 1st round, 1st overall pick
- Drafted by: New York Knicks
- Playing career: 1964–1971
- Position: Center / power forward
- Number: 22, 41, 23, 14, 28, 12

Career history
- 1964–1965: New York Knicks
- 1965–1966: Baltimore Bullets
- 1966–1968: Los Angeles Lakers
- 1968: Chicago Bulls
- 1968–1970: Boston Celtics
- 1970: Baltimore Bullets
- 1970–1971: Binghamton Flyers / Trenton Pat Pavers

Career highlights
- NBA champion (1969); NBA All-Rookie First Team (1965); Second-team All-American – NABC (1964); Third-team All-American – AP, UPI (1964); No. 45 retired by UTEP Miners

Career statistics
- Points: 3,997 (8.8 ppg)
- Rebounds: 2,939 (6.5 rpg)
- Assists: 377 (0.8 apg)
- Stats at NBA.com
- Stats at Basketball Reference
Medals
Men's basketball
Representing the United States
Olympic Games
Gold medal – first place	1964 Tokyo	Team competition

Velvet James Barnes (April 13, 1941 – September 14, 2002), also known as Jim "Bad News" Barnes, was an American basketball player, who was an Olympic Gold Medalist and the No. 1 overall pick of the 1964 NBA draft. He played college basketball at Texas Western College (now the University of Texas at El Paso).

== Early life ==
As a child, Barnes picked and chopped cotton, growing up in Tuckerman, Arkansas. He played basketball wearing socks, as his family was too poor to afford basketball shoes. At age 13, Barnes had grown to 6'6" and his grandfather was said to have been 7'0" tall.

Barnes attended the all-Black W.F. Branch High School in Newport, Arkansas after they promised to provide him basketball shoes. The team finished 3rd in the 1957 State Black Basketball Championships. Barnes then moved to Poplar Bluff High School (Mo.), where he was ruled ineligible due to residency issues. He returned to Branch where, playing in socks, as his feet had grown to size 17, he scored 68 points and had 38 rebounds against Vanndale.

Barnes' family was influenced, moved and he then enrolled at Stillwater High School in Stillwater, Oklahoma. There, he gained further notoriety when Stillwater defeated a state title Pampa, Texas team 94–40. However, Barnes was ruled ineligible after one season, after recruiting allegations surfaced and the team had to forfeit 22 games. He later returned to the team, after a suspension, that had won just a handful of games all season. He proceeded to lead them to 10 consecutive victories and the state championship. He was chosen as the Oklahoma High School Player of the Year, the first black player to receive the award.

== College career ==
A 6 ft 8 in (2.03 m) forward/center, Barnes then began his college career at Cameron College (at the time, a junior college) in Lawton, Oklahoma. Barnes chose Cameron after being recruited by Coach Henry Iba and Oklahoma A & M (now Oklahoma State) in Stillwater, saying later, “I just didn’t think academically I had the foundation to make it at a big college.” He tallied 28.8 points per game in his freshman year (1960–1961) and 30.6 points per game in his sophomore year. He also received NJCAA All-American honors as a sophomore (1961–1962).

Barnes then chose to attend the Texas Western College (now known as University of Texas at El Paso), under Hall of Fame Coach Don Haskins. Haskins' recruiting of Barnes led to a free throw contest that was won by Haskins and Barnes enrolled, saying Haskins and Miners player (and future Hall of Fame Coach) Nolan Richardson won him over with their honesty. Barnes enrolled at Texas Western, along with his good friend from Cameron, Ulysses Kendall, who played football for then Texas Western Football Coach Bum Phillips and later the Philadelphia Eagles.

In 1962–63 Barnes averaged a double-double of 18.9 points and 16.5 rebounds, shooting 50.3% from the field and 76.2% from the line, for the Texas Western Miners. The team finished 19–7 and qualified for the 1963 NCAA University Division basketball tournament, the Miners first trip to the NCAA's.

In 1963–64 Barnes averaged 29.1 points and 19.2 rebounds on 56.3% shooting from the field. His season was highlighted by a 51-point, 36 rebound effort in a 100–56 win over Western New Mexico on Jan. 4, 1964.

The 1963–64 Miners finished 25–3 and advanced to the 1964 NCAA University Division basketball tournament, where they were defeated by Kansas State in the Midwest Regional Semi-Final as Barnes fouled out of the game. Barnes had 42 points and 19 rebounds in the Miners' 68–62 first round win over Texas A & M.

The Miners beat Texas A&M (68–62) and lost to Kansas State (64–60) before knocking off Creighton 63–52, behind Barnes' 15 points and 10 rebounds, in the Midwest Region third-place game. "It was a special, special team" Haskins said years later, "and believe me, if Barnes' hadn't fouled out against Kansas state, that team would have won the title."

Barnes still holds UTEP single-game records for points, rebounds and field goals made. His career with 48 double-doubles, are also still the most in Miner history. The Miners program went on to win the 1966 NCAA Championship, defeating the University of Kentucky in the NCAA final.

== Professional career ==
Barnes was selected by the New York Knicks with the first overall pick of the 1964 NBA draft.

Barnes was named to the 1965 NBA All-Rookie Team, after averaging 15.5 points and 9.7 rebounds as a rookie for the Knicks in 1964–1965. After starting his second season in the league averaging 15.7 points and 10.3 rebounds in 7 games, he was traded along with Johnny Green, Johnny Egan and cash from the Knicks to the Baltimore Bullets for Walt Bellamy on November 1, 1965.

Barnes was very productive in his early career, averaging a double-double, before numerous knee and achilles injuries slowed him and eventually ended his career. After averaging 15.5 points and 9.7 rebounds for the Knicks/Bullets in 1964–1965, he averaged 12.4 points and 10.3 rebounds for the Bullets in 1965–1966. After that, he played less minutes due to injuries and became an effective reserve player.

Barnes won an NBA Championship with the Celtics in 1968–1969, serving at the backup to Bill Russell, although hampered by injury, he did not appear in the playoffs. Barnes' career then ended in 1971 after 11 games with Baltimore and brief stints with the Binghamton Flyers / Trenton Pat Pavers of the Eastern Basketball Association.

Overall, Barnes appeared in 454 games and played seven seasons (1964–71) in the NBA. He played for the Knicks (1964–1965), Baltimore Bullets (1965–1966 and 1970–1971), Los Angeles Lakers (1967–1968), Chicago Bulls (1968) and Boston Celtics (1968–1970), and he scored 3,997 points for an 8.8 points per average.

== National team career ==
Barnes was then selected a member of the 1964 United States men's Olympic basketball team. The USA team, coached by Henry Iba won the gold medal in the Tokyo Games when they defeated USSR, 73–59.

Of his Olympic experience, Barnes recalled, "Mr. Iba didn't want me practicing with the team because he was afraid I might hurt someone, I was kind of rough and tough. But Mr. Iba did a great job of bringing all that talent together. Nobody was expecting this team to win the Olympics."

Barnes was the top field-goal shooter (53 percent) on the Olympic squad, averaging 8.5 points in the teams' nine games. Barnes roomed with Bill Bradley and had Walt Hazzard and Larry Brown among his teammates

== Personal life ==
Celtics' coach and general manager, Red Auerbach, said of Barnes: "Jim's many friends and associates affectionately called him 'Bad News' [for the damage he did to opposing teams and players], but he was always 'Good News' to me. His tenure with the Celtics was short, but I enjoyed every moment he was there. Jim was a tremendous talent who never reached his full potential as an athlete. But Jim Barnes took it one better he was a great human being."

College teammate at UTEP Steve Tendennick said of Barnes, "He had a fantastic disposition, he was a gentle guy, but competitive. He was a great leader. He had the ability to corral all of us and keep us focused on what we needed to do. He was a wonderful friend and a wonderful teammate," Tredennick said. "Sometimes when you're as talented as Jim in relation to whoever is around you, you can be difficult to live with. He wasn't like that. He was a super guy. I'm sure if they kept assists [in 1964], he would've had a decent number. We had a rule, if you threw it into Barnes and he threw it back out to you, then you had the green light to shoot."

After his basketball career ended, Barnes settled in the Baltimore, Maryland area, after having played for the Baltimore Bullets twice. Barnes was a board member of the Washington D.C. organization "Kids in Trouble Inc." There, Barnes was involved in an annual celebrity tennis event, provided school counseling, was active in events on stopping youth violence and was a volunteer basketball coach for a local church team. Barnes advised star Maryland football player LaMont Jordan to focus on his studies and stay in school as an underclassman.

Barnes marketed a barbecue sauce called, “Bad News Barbecue Sauce,” which was sold in the Washington D.C. area and was on shelves for 24 years, selling 3 million cases. "I wanted to market something so people who were allergic to tomatoes could enjoy good smoke-grilled foods," said Barnes.

Rapper Blu named Jim Barnes his cousin in his song titled "Bad News Barnes" on his 2008 mixtape (So)ul Amazing.

Barnes died as a result of heart problems on September 14, 2002, at age 61. Barnes was survived by his wife, Gerri, and three daughters.

== Career statistics ==
Legend
GP	Games played	GS	Games started	MPG	Minutes per game
FG%	Field goal percentage	3P%	3-point field goal percentage	FT%	Free throw percentage
RPG	Rebounds per game	APG	Assists per game	SPG	Steals per game
BPG	Blocks per game	PPG	Points per game	**Bold**	Career high
†	Won an NBA championship

=== NBA ===
==== Regular season ====
Year	Team	GP	GS	MPG	FG%	FT%	RPG	APG	PPG
1964–65	New York	75	**69**	34.5	.424	.662	9.7	1.2	15.5
1965–66	New York	7	7	**37.6**	.444	.714	**10.3**	**1.3**	**15.7**
1965–66	Baltimore	66		29.2	.423	.679	**10.3**	**1.3**	12.1
1966–67	L.A. Lakers	**80**		17.5	.437	.684	5.6	.6	7.0
1967–68	L.A. Lakers	42		17.0	.430	.670	5.0	.6	6.2
1967–68	Chicago	37		19.2	.455	.718	5.5	.8	8.5
1968–69	Chicago	10		11.1	.390	.526	3.0	.1	5.6
1968–69†	Boston	49		12.1	.455	.707	4.0	.6	5.1
1969–70	Boston	77		13.6	.410	**.742**	4.5	.7	5.9
1970–71	Baltimore	11		9.1	**.536**	.636	1.5	.7	3.4
Career		454	76	20.8	.429	.684	6.5	.8	8.8

==== Playoffs ====
Year	Team	GP	MPG	FG%	FT%	RPG	APG	PPG
1966	Baltimore	3	**31.0**	**.500**	.538	**9.3**	**1.0**	**13.0**
1967	L.A. Lakers	3	16.7	.368	**1.000**	4.0	.7	6.3
1968	Chicago	**5**	11.4	.250	–	4.2	.2	1.2
Career		11	18.2	.413	.667	5.5	.5	5.8

== Awards and honors ==
- Barnes was chosen to carry the Olympic Torch in Little Rock, Arkansas on Memorial Day, 1996, saying: "After 32 years, I was chosen to carry the Olympic torch in my home state, but I couldn't see myself carrying it the whole mile, so three-quarters of the way through I gave it to a 14-year-old girl named Sarah and let her finish. Hopefully she'll go on and do something positive for someone someday."
- UTEP retired Barnes' #45 jersey. His number, along with #14 of Bobby Joe Hill, #14 of Tiny Archibald, #44 Harry Flournoy and #42 of Nolan Richardson are the only UTEP numbers retired. They are displayed in the Don Haskins Center, the UTEP arena.
- Barnes was selected as a member of the UTEP Athletics Hall of Fame in 2003.
- In 2009, Barnes was inducted into the Cameron College Athletics Hall of Fame.
- Barnes was inducted into the Arkansas Sports Hall of Fame in 2014.

== See also ==
- List of NCAA Division I men's basketball players with 30 or more rebounds in a game
