= 1965–66 Cincinnati Royals season =

NBA professional basketball team season

- Head coach: Jack McMahon
- Owners: Louis Jacobs
- Arena: Cincinnati Gardens

Results
- Record: 45–35 (.563)
- Place: Division: 3rd (Eastern)
- Playoff finish: Division semifinals (lost to Celtics 2–3)
- Stats at Basketball Reference

Local media
- Television: WKRC-TV
- Radio: WLW

The 1965–66 season was the Royals' 21st season overall, and their ninth in Cincinnati. The season involved a famous pennant chase in the NBA's Eastern Division, and their hosting of the 1966 NBA All-Star Game in Cincinnati. The team was still adjusting to the loss of defender Arlen Bockhorn. With the NBA's most wide-open offense, the Royals were again directed by Oscar Robertson, who fed shooters Jerry Lucas, Jack Twyman and Adrian Smith when not scoring himself. Forwards Happy Hairston and Tom Hawkins also saw court time, with Lucas sliding into the center spot. Defender Tom Thacker also occasionally got minutes at guard next to Robertson. The team's outstanding 1965 draft class netted four promising young stars in Nate Bowman, Flynn Robinson, Jon McGlocklin and Bob Love. But Bowman and Robinson battled injuries and illnesses all season long and did not impact the team. Love, a future NBA all-star and Hall of Fame inductee, was cut by coach Jack McMahon. All-NBA First Teammer Robertson again led the NBA in assists while scoring near the 30-point-per game mark and canning his usual pile of free throws at opponents expense, and averaged '30-10 ', while Lucas averaged ' 20-20 ', setting an NBA record for rebounds by a forward that still stands today. Both averaged 44 minutes per game to lead their team. Despite their contributions, the Royals would finish in third place with a record of 45 wins and 35 losses. In the playoffs, the Royals were again on the verge of ending the Boston Celtics championship reign. The Royals won 2 of the first 3 games in a 5-game series. Despite the commanding lead, the Celtics would win the next 2 games and eventually claim their 8th straight title.

== Regular season ==
=== Season standings ===
Eastern Division	W	L	PCT	GB	Home	Road	Neutral	Div
x-Philadelphia 76ers	55	25	.688	–	22–3	20–17	13–5	20–10
x-Boston Celtics	54	26	.675	1	26–5	19–18	9–3	19–11
x-Cincinnati Royals	45	35	.563	10	25–6	11–23	9–6	16–14
New York Knicks	30	50	.375	25	20–14	4–30	6–6	5–25

=== Game log ===
1965–66 game log
#	Date	Opponent	Score	High points	Record
1	October 15	St. Louis	111–100	Oscar Robertson (36)	0–1
2	October 16	@ Boston	98–102	Oscar Robertson (31)	0–2
3	October 17	Baltimore	124–144	Oscar Robertson (37)	1–2
4	October 19	San Francisco	100–99	Oscar Robertson (32)	1–3
5	October 28	Boston	108–113	Oscar Robertson (32)	2–3
6	October 29	@ Baltimore	131–121	Oscar Robertson (33)	3–3
7	October 30	@ Philadelphia	114–134	Adrian Smith (26)	3–4
8	October 31	Detroit	107–113	Adrian Smith (22)	4–4
9	November 3	San Francisco	108–122	Happy Hairston (28)	5–4
10	November 5	@ Detroit	120–114	Oscar Robertson (27)	6–4
11	November 6	@ New York	114–103	Oscar Robertson (29)	7–4
12	November 10	New York	119–124	Oscar Robertson (41)	8–4
13	November 13	Baltimore	132–135	Jerry Lucas (38)	9–4
14	November 17	Philadelphia	115–131	Oscar Robertson (28)	10–4
15	November 19	@ Boston	103–129	Jerry Lucas (25)	10–5
16	November 21	N Baltimore	120–114	Jerry Lucas (30)	11–5
17	November 23	N Detroit	118–115	Oscar Robertson (38)	11–6
18	November 24	St. Louis	108–112	Oscar Robertson (29)	12–6
19	November 26	New York	113–117	Oscar Robertson (30)	13–6
20	November 27	@ New York	132–129	Oscar Robertson (44)	14–6
21	November 30	Los Angeles	120–126	Oscar Robertson (41)	15–6
22	December 1	@ Los Angeles	105–121	Jerry Lucas (25)	15–7
23	December 2	N San Francisco	125–119	Adrian Smith (31)	15–8
24	December 3	@ Los Angeles	122–118	Oscar Robertson (48)	16–8
25	December 5	Boston	99–108	Oscar Robertson (31)	17–8
26	December 9	N San Francisco	110–109	Adrian Smith (26)	17–9
27	December 10	Los Angeles	129–110	Oscar Robertson (31)	17–10
28	December 11	N Philadelphia	135–132 (OT)	Oscar Robertson (33)	17–11
29	December 14	Philadelphia	109–112	Oscar Robertson (31)	18–11
30	December 15	@ Boston	117–110	Adrian Smith (34)	19–11
31	December 18	@ New York	114–122	Oscar Robertson (30)	19–12
32	December 22	@ Baltimore	127–129 (OT)	Oscar Robertson (43)	19–13
33	December 25	San Francisco	113–119	Oscar Robertson (35)	20–13
34	December 26	@ St. Louis	117–115	Oscar Robertson (37)	21–13
35	December 27	New York	116–138	Oscar Robertson (36)	22–13
36	December 29	Los Angeles	109–111	Oscar Robertson (40)	23–13
37	January 1	@ New York	122–147	Happy Hairston (26)	23–14
38	January 2	Baltimore	107–138	Adrian Smith (26)	24–14
39	January 3	N St. Louis	114–130	Oscar Robertson (37)	25–14
40	January 5	N Detroit	103–117	Adrian Smith (35)	26–14
41	January 6	N Detroit	97–109	Oscar Robertson (29)	27–14
42	January 8	@ Baltimore	126–115	Oscar Robertson (35)	28–14
43	January 13	N St. Louis	102–107	Happy Hairston (26)	29–14
44	January 16	Detroit	106–108	Lucas, Robertson (32)	30–14
45	January 18	Los Angeles	108–119	Oscar Robertson (26)	31–14
46	January 21	@ Boston	96–113	Oscar Robertson (24)	31–15
47	January 24	N San Francisco	112–135	Oscar Robertson (29)	32–15
48	January 25	Boston	101–113	Oscar Robertson (35)	33–15
49	January 28	@ Philadelphia	103–125	Oscar Robertson (19)	33–16
50	January 29	St. Louis	115–116	Adrian Smith (33)	34–16
51	January 30	@ St. Louis	98–115	Oscar Robertson (33)	34–17
52	February 1	@ San Francisco	125–127	Happy Hairston (23)	34–18
53	February 2	@ Los Angeles	118–119	Oscar Robertson (44)	34–19
54	February 4	@ Los Angeles	125–132	Oscar Robertson (29)	34–20
55	February 6	N San Francisco	116–117	Jack Twyman (31)	35–20
56	February 7	N Detroit	124–118	Oscar Robertson (34)	35–21
57	February 8	Baltimore	113–128	Oscar Robertson (38)	36–21
58	February 11	@ Philadelphia	94–113	Jack Twyman (19)	36–22
59	February 12	Detroit	116–143	Oscar Robertson (26)	37–22
60	February 13	@ St. Louis	102–104	Jerry Lucas (31)	37–23
61	February 15	Boston	123–136	Oscar Robertson (31)	38–23
62	February 18	@ Baltimore	114–118	Oscar Robertson (44)	38–24
63	February 19	@ New York	113–124	Oscar Robertson (42)	38–25
64	February 20	@ Detroit	133–129	Jerry Lucas (35)	39–25
65	February 21	N Philadelphia	107–113	Oscar Robertson (40)	40–25
66	February 23	@ Los Angeles	133–140	Oscar Robertson (39)	40–26
67	February 25	@ San Francisco	119–125	Jerry Lucas (32)	40–27
68	February 26	@ San Francisco	112–103	Oscar Robertson (39)	41–27
69	March 1	Philadelphia	100–102	Oscar Robertson (40)	42–27
70	March 4	Philadelphia	107–103	Oscar Robertson (36)	42–28
71	March 5	New York	145–149 (OT)	Oscar Robertson (44)	43–28
72	March 6	@ Detroit	137–125	Oscar Robertson (30)	44–28
73	March 9	N Los Angeles	119–116	Oscar Robertson (39)	44–29
74	March 10	Boston	124–120	Jerry Lucas (31)	44–30
75	March 12	St. Louis	114–113	Oscar Robertson (33)	44–31
76	March 13	@ St. Louis	106–115	Jerry Lucas (23)	44–32
77	March 15	N New York	107–125	Oscar Robertson (26)	45–32
78	March 18	@ Baltimore	105–125	Oscar Robertson (27)	45–33
79	March 19	@ Philadelphia	121–127	Adrian Smith (24)	45–34
80	March 20	@ Boston	104–121	Oscar Robertson (24)	45–35

== Playoffs ==
1966 playoff game log
Division semifinals: 2–3 (home: 0–2; road: 2–1)

Game	Date	Team	Score	High points	High rebounds	High assists	Location Attendance	Series
1	March 23	@ Boston	W 107–103	Smith, Robertson (26)	Jerry Lucas (27)	Oscar Robertson (3)	Boston Garden; 9,510	1–0
2	March 26	Boston	L 125–132	Oscar Robertson (35)	Jerry Lucas (24)	Oscar Robertson (11)	Cincinnati Gardens; 10,027	1–1
3	March 27	@ Boston	W 113–107	Robertson, Lucas (27)	Jerry Lucas (16)	Adrian Smith (6)	Boston Garden; 13,571	2–1
4	March 30	Boston	L 103–120	Oscar Robertson (34)	Jerry Lucas (17)	Oscar Robertson (11)	Cincinnati Gardens; 12,107	2–2
5	April 1	@ Boston	L 103–112	Oscar Robertson (37)	Jerry Lucas (17)	Oscar Robertson (9)	Boston Garden; 13,909	2–3

1966 schedule

== Awards and honors ==
- Oscar Robertson – First Team All-NBA,
- Jerry Lucas – First Team All-NBA,
- Adrian Smith, MVP of the 1966 NBA All-Star Game, held in Cincinnati.
