= 1965–66 Boston Celtics season =

NBA basketball team season (won championship)

- NBA champions
- Head coach: Red Auerbach
- Arena: Boston Garden

Results
- Record: 54–26 (.675)
- Place: Division: 2nd (Eastern)
- Playoff finish: NBA champions (Defeated Lakers 4–3)
- Stats at Basketball Reference

Local media
- Television: WHDH-TV
- Radio: WHDH

The 1965–66 Boston Celtics season was their 20th in the National Basketball Association (NBA).

On October 29, 1965, Sam Jones set a Celtics single-game scoring record with 51, against the Detroit Pistons. His record would last until Larry Bird's 53 in 1983. The Celtics won their 8th title in a row, which still stands as a record for the most titles in a row. The Celtics defeated the Lakers 4 games to 3.

This also marked the final season Red Auerbach coached the Celtics, though his duties with the team only expanded as general manager in the following seasons; he would remain involved with the team in some form until his death 40 years later.

== 1966 NBA finals ==
The 1965-1966 NBA Finals was a close seven-game series between the Boston Celtics and the Los Angeles Lakers. The Celtics entered the series as the favorites, having won the championship the previous year and boasting a strong roster led by Hall of Famers Bill Russell, John Havlicek, and Sam Jones. The Lakers were also led by two Hall of Fame players, that being Jerry West and Elgin Baylor.

The series began with a closely contested game one, which the Lakers won by a score of 133–129 in overtime. The Celtics bounced back in game two, with a 129–123 victory that featured standout performances from Russell and Jones. The series continued in this back-and-forth fashion, with each team trading wins and delivering memorable moments.

In game five, Russell had one of the greatest performances in NBA Finals history, recording 32 points and 30 rebounds to lead the Celtics to a 129–96 victory. The Lakers responded in game six, with Baylor scoring 41 points in a 120–118 win that forced a decisive game seven.

Game seven was a tightly contested affair, with both teams trading baskets and neither able to pull away. In the end, it was the Celtics who emerged victorious, thanks in large part to the heroics of Havlicek. With the score tied at 100-100 and just seconds remaining, Havlicek stole an inbound pass from the Lakers and scored the game-winning basket with five seconds left on the clock. The Celtics won the game 95-93 and secured their eighth championship in ten years.

The 1965-1966 NBA Finals are a classic series between two of the most influential teams in basketball history. The Celtics and Lakers would meet again in the Finals several times over the years, but this series remains one of the most significant in the history of the NBA.

== Offseason ==
=== Draft picks ===
Round	Pick	Player	Position	Nationality	College
1	8	Ollie Johnson	SF	United States	San Francisco

== Roster ==
1965–66 Boston Celtics roster
Players

Pos.	No.	Player	Height	Weight	DOB	From
SG	21	Ron Bonham	6 ft 5 in (1.96 m)	192 lb (87 kg)	1942-05-31	Cincinnati
C	11	Mel Counts	7 ft 0 in (2.13 m)	230 lb (104 kg)	1941-10-16	Oregon State
G/F	28	Si Green	6 ft 2 in (1.88 m)	185 lb (84 kg)	1933-08-20	Duquesne
SF	17	John Havlicek	6 ft 5 in (1.96 m)	203 lb (92 kg)	1940-04-08	Ohio State
PG	25	K. C. Jones	6 ft 1 in (1.85 m)	200 lb (91 kg)	1932-05-25	San Francisco
SG	24	Sam Jones	6 ft 4 in (1.93 m)	198 lb (90 kg)	1933-06-24	North Carolina Central
SF	12	Willie Naulls	6 ft 6 in (1.98 m)	225 lb (102 kg)	1934-10-07	UCLA
SF	19	Don Nelson	6 ft 6 in (1.98 m)	210 lb (95 kg)	1940-05-15	Iowa
C	6	Bill Russell	6 ft 9 in (2.06 m)	215 lb (98 kg)	1934-02-12	San Francisco
PF	16	Satch Sanders	6 ft 6 in (1.98 m)	210 lb (95 kg)	1938-11-08	NYU
PF	18	Woody Sauldsberry	6 ft 7 in (2.01 m)	220 lb (100 kg)	1934-07-11	Texas Southern
PG	20	Larry Siegfried	6 ft 3 in (1.91 m)	190 lb (86 kg)	1939-05-22	Ohio State
C	5	John Thompson	6 ft 10 in (2.08 m)	225 lb (102 kg)	1941-09-02	Providence
F	12	Ron Watts	6 ft 6 in (1.98 m)	210 lb (95 kg)	1943-05-21	Wake Forest

Coaches
Head coach
- Red Auerbach

Legend
- (DP) Unsigned draft pick
- (FA) Free agent
- (S) Suspended
- Injured

== Regular season ==
=== Season standings ===
Eastern Division	W	L	PCT	GB	Home	Road	Neutral	Div
x-Philadelphia 76ers	55	25	.688	–	22–3	20–17	13–5	20–10
x-Boston Celtics	54	26	.675	1	26–5	19–18	9–3	19–11
x-Cincinnati Royals	45	35	.563	10	25–6	11–23	9–6	16–14
New York Knicks	30	50	.375	25	20–14	4–30	6–6	5–25

=== Game log ===
Several of the Celtics games were played in neutral sites, such as Providence, Rhode Island. The games in Providence occurred on November 9 and 26, December 30, February 10 and March 4. Games were also played in Fort Wayne, Indiana (against Detroit on January 27) and in Syracuse, New York (against Philadelphia on February 12) and Memphis, Tennessee (against St. Louis on March 7).

1965–66 game log
October

Game	Date	Opponent	Score	Location	Record
1	October 16	Cincinnati Royals	102–98	Boston Garden	1–0
2	October 20	Los Angeles Lakers	100–96	Boston Garden	2–0
3	October 23	@ St. Louis Hawks	110–120	St. Louis Arena	2–1
4	October 28	@ Cincinnati Royals	108–113	Cincinnati	2–2
5	October 29	@ Detroit Pistons	106–108	Detroit	2–3
6	October 31	Baltimore Bullets	105–100	Boston Garden	3–3

November

Game	Date	Opponent	Score	Location	Record
7	November 5	@ Baltimore Bullets	129–118	Baltimore	4–3
8	November 6	Philadelphia 76ers	101–91	Boston Garden	5–3
9	November 9	Baltimore Bullets	130–116	Providence	6–3
10	November 11	St. Louis Hawks	87–83	Boston Garden	7–3
11	November 12	@ Philadelphia 76ers	114–123	Convention Hall	7–4
12	November 13	Detroit Pistons	122–93	Boston Garden	8–4
13	November 16	@ San Francisco Warriors	108–105	San Francisco	9–4
14	November 17	@ Los Angeles Lakers	115–125	Los Angeles	9–5
15	November 19	Cincinnati Royals	129–103	Boston Garden	10–5
16	November 20	@ New York Knicks	122–108	Madison Square Garden	11–5
17	November 24	New York Knicks	125–110	Boston Garden	12–5
18	November 26	Detroit Pistons	134–114	Providence	13–5
19	November 27	Los Angeles Lakers	101–95	Boston Garden	14–5

December

Game	Date	Opponent	Score	Location/Attendance	Record
20	December 3	Philadelphia 76ers	103–119	Boston Garden	14–6
21	December 4	@ St. Louis Hawks	100–94	St. Louis Arena	15–6
22	December 5	@ Cincinnati Royals	99–108	Cincinnati	15–7
23	December 7	St. Louis Hawks	112–96	New York, NY	16–7
24	December 8	Los Angeles Lakers	108–106	Boston Garden	17–7
25	December 11	San Francisco Warriors	143–106	Boston Garden	18–7
26	December 15	Cincinnati Royals	110–117	Boston Garden	18–8
27	December 17	@ Detroit Pistons	114–112	Detroit	19–8
28	December 22	New York Knickerbockers	123–120	Boston Garden	20–8
29	December 25	@ Baltimore Bullets	113–99	Baltimore	21–8
30	December 26	Baltimore Bullets	120–99	Baltimore	22–8
31	December 28	@ Philadelphia 76ers	93–102	Baltimore	22–9
32	December 29	@ New York Knicks	99–96	Madison Square Garden	23–9
33	December 30	San Francisco Warriors	116–113	Providence	24–9

January

Game	Date	Opponent	Score	Location/Attendance	Record
34	January 1	@ St. Louis Hawks	98–100	St. Louis Arena	24–10
35	January 2	@ Los Angeles Lakers	124–113	Los Angeles Memorial Sports Arena	25–10
36	January 5	@ Los Angeles Lakers	113–120	Los Angeles Memorial Sports Arena	25–11
37	January 7	@ San Francisco Warriors	115–114	San Francisco Civic Auditorium	26–11
38	January 8	@ San Francisco Warriors	124–96	San Francisco Civic Auditorium	27–11
39	January 12	Los Angeles Lakers	114–102	Boston Garden	28–11
40	January 14	@ Philadelphia 76ers	100–112	Convention Hall	28–12
41	January 16	Philadelphia 76ers	137–122	Boston Garden	29–12
42	January 18	Detroit Pistons	115–116	Philadelphia	29–13
43	January 19	Baltimore Bullets	129–89	Boston Garden	30–13
44	January 21	Cincinnati Royals	113–96	Boston Garden	31–13
45	January 22	@ Baltimore Bullets	107–132	Baltimore Civic Center	31–14
46	January 25	@ Cincinnati Royals	101–113	Cincinnati Gardens	31–15
47	January 27	Detroit Pistons	131–112	Fort Wayne, IN	32–15
48	January 28	Detroit Pistons	105–108	Boston Garden	32–16
49	January 29	@ New York Knickerbockers	119–107	Madison Square Garden	33–16
50	January 30	New York Knickerbockers	118–115	Boston Garden	34–16

February

Game	Date	Opponent	Score	Location/Attendance	Record
51	February 1	Detroit Pistons	100–81	New York	35–16
52	February 2	@ Detroit Pistons	93–99	Cobo Arena	35–17
53	February 4	St. Louis Hawks	117–95	Boston Garden	36–17
54	February 5	@ Baltimore Bullets	94–113	Baltimore Civic Center	36–18
55	February 6	Philadelphia 76ers	100–99	Boston Garden	37–18
56	February 7	San Francisco Warriors	112–107	Philadelphia	38–18
57	February 9	New York Knicks	121–117	Boston Garden	39–18
58	February 10	San Francisco Warriors	117–128	Providence, RI	39–19
59	February 11	San Francisco Warriors	99–96	Boston Garden	40–19
60	February 12	Philadelphia 76ers	85–83	Syracuse, NY	41–19
61	February 13	Los Angeles Lakers	110–120	Boston Garden	41–20
62	February 15	@ Cincinnati Royals	123–136	Cincinnati Gardens	41–21
63	February 18	@ San Francisco Warriors	106–128	San Francisco Civic Auditorium	41–22
64	February 19	@ Los Angeles Lakers	115–111	Los Angeles Memorial Sports Arena	42–22
65	February 21	@ Los Angeles Lakers	115–108	Los Angeles Memorial Sports Arena	43–22
66	February 22	@ San Francisco Warriors	116–108	San Francisco Civic Auditorium	44–22
67	February 24	St. Louis Hawks	134–106	Boston Garden	45–22
68	February 26	@ New York Knicks	100–95	Madison Square Garden	46–22
69	February 27	@ Baltimore Bullets	92–132	Baltimore Civic Center	46–23

March

Game	Date	Opponent	Score	Location/Attendance	Record
70	March 1	@ St. Louis Hawks	120–95	Kiel Auditorium	47–23
71	March 2	New York Knickerbockers	140–104	Boston Garden	48–23
72	March 4	St. Louis Hawks	112–132	Providence, RI	48–24
73	March 5	@ Philadelphia 76ers	85–102	Convention Hall	48–25
74	March 6	Philadelphia 76ers	110–113	Boston Garden	48–26
75	March 7	St. Louis Hawks	106–104	Memphis, TN	49–26
76	March 10	@ Cincinnati Royals	124–120	Cincinnati Gardens	50–26
77	March 13	Baltimore Bullets	129–98	Boston Garden	51–26
78	March 17	@ Detroit Pistons	128–103	Cobo Arena	52–26
79	March 19	@ New York Knicks	126–113	Madison Square Garden	53–26
80	March 20	Cincinnati Royals	121–104	Boston Garden	54–26

1965–66 Schedule

== Playoffs ==
1966 playoff game log
Division Semifinals: 3–2 (home: 1–2; road: 2–0)

Game	Date	Team	Score	High points	High rebounds	High assists	Location Attendance	Series
1	March 23	Cincinnati	L 103–107	Bill Russell (22)	Bill Russell (29)	Russell, Havlicek (4)	Boston Garden; 9,510	0–1
2	March 26	@ Cincinnati	W 132–125	Sam Jones (42)	Bill Russell (16)	K. C. Jones (9)	Cincinnati Gardens; 10,027	1–1
3	March 27	Cincinnati	L 107–113	John Havlicek (36)	Bill Russell (25)	K. C. Jones (6)	Boston Garden; 13,571	1–2
4	March 30	@ Cincinnati	W 120–103	Sam Jones (32)	Bill Russell (26)	John Havlicek (8)	Cincinnati Gardens; 12,107	2–2
5	April 1	Cincinnati	W 112–103	Sam Jones (34)	Bill Russell (31)	Bill Russell (11)	Boston Garden; 13,909	3–2

Division Finals: 4–1 (home: 2–0; road: 2–1)

Game	Date	Team	Score	High points	High rebounds	High assists	Location Attendance	Series
1	April 3	@ Philadelphia	W 115–96	Sam Jones (29)	Bill Russell (18)	three players tied (4)	Municipal Auditorium; 6,563	1–0
2	April 6	Philadelphia	W 114–93	Sam Jones (23)	Bill Russell (29)	K. C. Jones (11)	Boston Garden; 13,909	2–0
3	April 7	@ Philadelphia	L 105–111	John Havlicek (27)	Bill Russell (23)	Sam Jones (6)	Municipal Auditorium; 10,454	2–1
4	April 10	Philadelphia	W 114–108 (OT)	John Havlicek (27)	Bill Russell (30)	Russell, Havlicek (7)	Boston Garden; 13,909	3–1
5	April 12	@ Philadelphia	W 120–112	John Havlicek (32)	Bill Russell (31)	Bill Russell (6)	Municipal Auditorium; 8,623	4–1

NBA Finals: 4–3 (home: 2–2; road: 2–1)

Game	Date	Team	Score	High points	High rebounds	High assists	Location Attendance	Series
1	April 17	Los Angeles	L 129–133 (OT)	Bill Russell (28)	Bill Russell (26)	Sam Jones (9)	Boston Garden; 13,909	0–1
2	April 19	Los Angeles	W 129–109	Havlicek, S. Jones (21)	Bill Russell (24)	John Havlicek (7)	Boston Garden; 13,909	1–1
3	April 20	@ Los Angeles	W 120–106	Sam Jones (36)	Bill Russell (19)	Sanders, K. C. Jones (5)	Los Angeles Memorial Sports Arena; 15,101	2–1
4	April 22	@ Los Angeles	W 122–117	John Havlicek (32)	Bill Russell (18)	Larry Siegfried (7)	Los Angeles Memorial Sports Arena; 15,251	3–1
5	April 24	Los Angeles	L 117–121	Bill Russell (32)	Bill Russell (28)	Siegfried, K. C. Jones (6)	Boston Garden; 13,909	3–2
6	April 26	@ Los Angeles	L 115–123	John Havlicek (27)	Bill Russell (23)	K. C. Jones (6)	Los Angeles Memorial Sports Arena; 15,069	3–3
7	April 28	Los Angeles	W 95–93	Bill Russell (25)	Bill Russell (32)	Sanders, K. C. Jones (3)	Boston Garden; 13,909	4–3

1966 schedule

== Awards, records and milestones ==
=== Awards ===
- John Havlicek, All-NBA Second Team
- Sam Jones, All-NBA Second Team
- Bill Russell, All-NBA Second Team
