= 1965–66 Philadelphia 76ers season =

Season of National Basketball Association team the Philadelphia 76ers

- Division champions
- Head coach: Dolph Schayes
- General manager: Irv Kosloff
- Owner: Irv Kosloff
- Arena: Municipal Auditorium

Results
- Record: 55–25 (.688)
- Place: Division: 1st (Eastern)
- Playoff finish: Division finals (lost to Celtics 1–4)
- Stats at Basketball Reference

Local media
- Television: WFIL-TV
- Radio: WCAU

The 1965–66 Philadelphia 76ers season was the 76ers 17th season in the NBA and 3rd season in City of Philadelphia. The Sixers would capture the regular season division championship by a game over the Boston Celtics. However, in the Eastern Conference finals, they would lose to the Celtics in five games. After this series, Dolph Schayes was fired as coach and Alex Hannum would take over as the new coach.

== Roster ==
1965–66 Philadelphia 76ers roster
Players

Pos.	No.	Player	Height	Weight	DOB	From
G	24	Al Bianchi	6 ft 3 in (1.91 m)	185 lb (84 kg)	1932-03-26	Bowling Green
C	13	Wilt Chamberlain	7 ft 1 in (2.16 m)	275 lb (125 kg)	1936-08-21	Kansas
F	32	Billy Cunningham	6 ft 6 in (1.98 m)	210 lb (95 kg)	1943-06-03	North Carolina
F	20, 30	Dave Gambee	6 ft 6 in (1.98 m)	215 lb (98 kg)	1937-04-16	Oregon State
G	15	Hal Greer	6 ft 2 in (1.88 m)	175 lb (79 kg)	1936-06-26	Marshall
G/F	35	Art Heyman	6 ft 5 in (1.96 m)	205 lb (93 kg)	1941-06-24	Duke
F	54	Lucious Jackson	6 ft 9 in (2.06 m)	240 lb (109 kg)	1941-10-31	UTRGV
G	23	Wali Jones	6 ft 2 in (1.88 m)	180 lb (82 kg)	1942-02-14	Villanova
F	25	Chet Walker	6 ft 6 in (1.98 m)	212 lb (96 kg)	1940-02-22	Bradley
G	12	Gerry Ward	6 ft 4 in (1.93 m)	195 lb (88 kg)	1941-09-06	Boston College
F	14	Ben Warley	6 ft 5 in (1.96 m)	200 lb (91 kg)	1936-09-04	Tennessee State
G	35	Bob Weiss	6 ft 2 in (1.88 m)	180 lb (82 kg)	1942-05-07	Penn State

Coaches
Head coach
- Dolph Schayes

Legend
- (DP) Unsigned draft pick
- (FA) Free agent
- (S) Suspended
- Injured

Roster
Updated: December 2, 1965

== Regular season ==
Eastern Division	W	L	PCT	GB	Home	Road	Neutral	Div
x-Philadelphia 76ers	55	25	.688	–	22–3	20–17	13–5	20–10
x-Boston Celtics	54	26	.675	1	26–5	19–18	9–3	19–11
x-Cincinnati Royals	45	35	.563	10	25–6	11–23	9–6	16–14
New York Knicks	30	50	.375	25	20–14	4–30	6–6	5–25

x – clinched playoff spot

=== Game log ===
1965–66 game log
#	Date	Opponent	Score	High points	Record
1	October 16	@ Baltimore	133–101	Wilt Chamberlain (33)	1–0
2	October 23	Detroit	103–120	Wilt Chamberlain (53)	2–0
3	October 30	Cincinnati	114–134	Wilt Chamberlain (39)	3–0
4	November 3	@ Detroit	100–110	Wilt Chamberlain (32)	3–1
5	November 4	N San Francisco	121–119	Hal Greer (35)	3–2
6	November 5	San Francisco	115–133	Hal Greer (33)	4–2
7	November 6	@ Boston	91–101	Wilt Chamberlain (30)	4–3
8	November 9	Los Angeles	110–118	Wilt Chamberlain (39)	5–3
9	November 11	N San Francisco	101–109	Wilt Chamberlain (26)	6–3
10	November 12	Boston	114–123	Hal Greer (28)	7–3
11	November 13	@ New York	127–119	Hal Greer (38)	8–3
12	November 16	N St. Louis	98–107	Wilt Chamberlain (30)	9–3
13	November 17	@ Cincinnati	115–131	Wilt Chamberlain (46)	9–4
14	November 19	Baltimore	134–124	Wilt Chamberlain (36)	9–5
15	November 20	@ Baltimore	112–117	Chamberlain, Greer (21)	9–6
16	November 21	@ Los Angeles	110–104	Wilt Chamberlain (32)	10–6
17	November 24	@ Los Angeles	124–127	Wilt Chamberlain (42)	10–7
18	November 26	@ San Francisco	132–120	Chamberlain, Greer (25)	11–7
19	November 27	@ San Francisco	124–117	Wilt Chamberlain (38)	12–7
20	November 30	N Baltimore	108–129	Wilt Chamberlain (41)	12–8
21	December 3	@ Boston	119–103	Wilt Chamberlain (28)	13–8
22	December 6	N Los Angeles	116–107	Wilt Chamberlain (29)	14–8
23	December 8	@ Baltimore	127–129	Wilt Chamberlain (46)	14–9
24	December 10	Detroit	116–114	Wilt Chamberlain (40)	14–10
25	December 11	N Cincinnati	135–132 (OT)	Wilt Chamberlain (38)	15–10
26	December 14	@ Cincinnati	109–112	Wilt Chamberlain (32)	15–11
27	December 15	@ Los Angeles	122–108	Hal Greer (33)	16–11
28	December 17	@ Los Angeles	127–117	Wilt Chamberlain (38)	17–11
29	December 18	@ San Francisco	120–116 (OT)	Chamberlain, Walker (23)	18–11
30	December 20	@ San Francisco	118–124	Wilt Chamberlain (45)	18–12
31	December 26	San Francisco	107–121	Wilt Chamberlain (33)	19–12
32	December 28	Boston	93–102	Wilt Chamberlain (31)	20–12
33	December 29	@ Detroit	113–112	Wilt Chamberlain (34)	21–12
34	December 30	@ St. Louis	113–130	Chamberlain, Cunningham (23)	21–13
35	January 2	New York	122–133	Wilt Chamberlain (50)	22–13
36	January 4	@ New York	129–127	Hal Greer (36)	23–13
37	January 6	N Baltimore	133–127	Wilt Chamberlain (41)	24–13
38	January 7	Los Angeles	126–120	Wilt Chamberlain (49)	24–14
39	January 8	@ St. Louis	105–115	Wilt Chamberlain (29)	24–15
40	January 9	@ St. Louis	127–117	Wilt Chamberlain (41)	25–15
41	January 12	@ Detroit	111–129	Wilt Chamberlain (41)	25–16
42	January 14	Boston	100–112	Wilt Chamberlain (37)	26–16
43	January 16	@ Boston	122–137	Billy Cunningham (28)	26–17
44	January 18	Baltimore	117–128	Wilt Chamberlain (44)	27–17
45	January 19	N Detroit	110–93	Wilt Chamberlain (33)	28–17
46	January 21	New York	98–109	Chamberlain, Walker (27)	29–17
47	January 23	@ St. Louis	104–98	Wilt Chamberlain (36)	30–17
48	January 24	N St. Louis	107–110	Billy Cunningham (29)	31–17
49	January 25	N Los Angeles	110–106	Wilt Chamberlain (53)	32–17
50	January 28	Cincinnati	103–125	Wilt Chamberlain (43)	33–17
51	January 30	Detroit	98–117	Wilt Chamberlain (38)	34–17
52	February 2	N St. Louis	96–89	Wilt Chamberlain (21)	34–18
53	February 5	@ New York	113–120	Wilt Chamberlain (34)	34–19
54	February 6	@ Boston	99–100	Chet Walker (23)	34–20
55	February 7	Los Angeles	125–132	Wilt Chamberlain (65)	35–20
56	February 8	@ New York	123–136	Wilt Chamberlain (38)	35–21
57	February 9	@ Detroit	108–91	Wilt Chamberlain (30)	36–21
58	February 11	Cincinnati	94–113	Wilt Chamberlain (32)	37–21
59	February 12	N Boston	83–85	Chamberlain, Greer (29)	37–22
60	February 14	N Detroit	149–123	Wilt Chamberlain (41)	38–22
61	February 15	N St. Louis	109–121	Wilt Chamberlain (34)	39–22
62	February 17	@ Los Angeles	136–121	Wilt Chamberlain (30)	40–22
63	February 19	@ San Francisco	123–119	Wilt Chamberlain (30)	41–22
64	February 21	N Cincinnati	107–113	Wilt Chamberlain (24)	41–23
65	February 22	N Detroit	117–112	Wilt Chamberlain (32)	42–23
66	February 23	@ Baltimore	115–119	Hal Greer (37)	42–24
67	February 25	New York	124–130	Wilt Chamberlain (35)	43–24
68	February 26	N Baltimore	114–98	Billy Cunningham (23)	44–24
69	March 1	@ Cincinnati	100–102	Wilt Chamberlain (22)	44–25
70	March 3	San Francisco	125–135	Wilt Chamberlain (62)	45–25
71	March 4	@ Cincinnati	107–103	Wilt Chamberlain (36)	46–25
72	March 5	Boston	85–102	Chamberlain, Greer (27)	47–25
73	March 6	@ Boston	113–110	Wilt Chamberlain (32)	48–25
74	March 8	N St. Louis	106–112	Chamberlain, Greer (23)	49–25
75	March 9	St. Louis	115–123	Chamberlain, Greer (31)	50–25
76	March 12	New York	126–134	Hal Greer (24)	51–25
77	March 13	@ New York	115–113	Chet Walker (29)	52–25
78	March 17	New York	106–115	Wilt Chamberlain (37)	53–25
79	March 19	Cincinnati	121–127	Wilt Chamberlain (39)	54–25
80	March 20	@ Baltimore	108–104	Chamberlain, Greer (24)	55–25

== Playoffs ==
1966 playoff game log
Division finals: 1–4 (home: 1–2; road: 0–2)

Game	Date	Team	Score	High points	High rebounds	High assists	Location Attendance	Series
1	April 3	Boston	L 96–115	Wilt Chamberlain (25)	Wilt Chamberlain (32)	Chamberlain, W. Jones (5)	Municipal Auditorium; 6,563	0–1
2	April 6	@ Boston	L 93–114	Wilt Chamberlain (23)	Wilt Chamberlain (25)	Billy Cunningham (4)	Boston Garden; 13,909	0–2
3	April 7	Boston	W 111–105	Wilt Chamberlain (31)	Wilt Chamberlain (27)	Hal Greer (9)	Municipal Auditorium; 10,454	1–2
4	April 10	@ Boston	L 108–114 (OT)	Hal Greer (25)	Wilt Chamberlain (33)	Hal Greer (4)	Boston Garden; 13,909	1–3
5	April 12	Boston	L 112–120	Wilt Chamberlain (46)	Wilt Chamberlain (34)	Chet Walker (8)	Municipal Auditorium; 8,623	1–4

1966 schedule

== Awards and records ==
- Wilt Chamberlain, NBA Most Valuable Player Award
- Dolph Schayes, NBA Coach of the Year Award
- Wilt Chamberlain, All-NBA First Team
- Hal Greer, All-NBA Second Team
- Billy Cunningham, NBA All-Rookie Team (1st)
