= List of NBA single-game playoff scoring leaders =

This is a complete listing of National Basketball Association players who have scored 50 or more points in a playoff game. This feat has only been accomplished 50 times in NBA playoff history by 33 players. Eight players have scored 50 or more points on more than one occasion: Michael Jordan (eight times), Wilt Chamberlain (four times), Allen Iverson (three times), Donovan Mitchell (three times), Jerry West (twice), Jamal Murray (twice), Damian Lillard (twice) and Jayson Tatum (twice). Rick Barry scored the last two of his three 50+ point playoff games in the American Basketball Association (ABA).

Out of those 50 times, a player has earned himself a double-double (having double digits in two statistical categories) only 18 times; points and rebounds achieved 14 times and points and assists the remaining 4 times. This feat has been achieved by 16 different players. In order of most points scored, these include Elgin Baylor, Wilt Chamberlain (4 times), Charles Barkley, Rick Barry, Damian Lillard, Jerry West, Nikola Jokić, Sleepy Floyd, Jayson Tatum, Bob Pettit, Billy Cunningham, Bob McAdoo, Karl Malone, Dirk Nowitzki, Jamal Murray and Giannis Antetokounmpo. Out of those 32 players, 6 players were born outside of the United States: Dominique Wilkins (France), Dirk Nowitzki (Germany), Jamal Murray (Canada), Giannis Antetokounmpo (Greece), Nikola Jokić (Serbia) and Joel Embiid (Cameroon).

The only NBA player to record a 50+ point triple-double in a playoff game is Russell Westbrook, who scored 51 points while grabbing 10 rebounds and dealing out 13 assists. In the American Basketball Association prior to merging with the NBA, George McGinnis of the Indiana Pacers recorded a 50+ triple double with 51 points, 17 rebounds, and 10 assists on April 12, 1975. The only players to score 50 or more points in a playoff game seven are Stephen Curry, who scored 50 points against the Sacramento Kings on April 30, 2023, and Jayson Tatum, who scored 51 points against the Philadelphia 76ers on May 14, 2023. Only two players scored 50 or more points in the same game. Donovan Mitchell of the Utah Jazz and Jamal Murray of the Denver Nuggets scored 51 and 50 points, respectively, on August 23, 2020. On August 30, 2020, Murray scored 50 points against the Utah Jazz, joining Mitchell as the first pair of players in NBA playoff history to record multiple 50-point games in the same series. Only four players have scored 50 or more points more than once in the same series: Michael Jordan (vs. Cleveland Cavaliers, 1988), Allen Iverson (vs. Toronto Raptors, 2001), Donovan Mitchell (vs. Denver Nuggets, 2020), and Jamal Murray (vs. Utah Jazz, 2020). Michael Jordan has five of the ten highest-scoring playoff games in NBA history.

== Key ==
^	Active NBA player				
*	Inducted into the Naismith Memorial Basketball Hall of Fame				
†	Not yet eligible for Hall of Fame consideration (Note: A player is not eligible for induction into the Naismith Memorial Basketball Hall of Fame until he has been fully retired for two calendar years.)				
§	1st time eligible for Hall of Fame in 2027				
	Player's team lost the game				
	Double-double				
	Triple-double				
	Stat either not recorded or couldn't be found				
MP	Minutes played	FGM	Field goals made	FGA	Field goal attempts
FG%	Field goal percentage	3PM	3-point field goals made	3PA	3-point field goal attempts
3P%	3-point field goal percentage	FTM	Free throws made	FTA	Free throw attempts
FT%	Free throw percentage	TRB	Rebound (basketball)	AST	Assist (basketball)

== Single-game leaders ==
Rank	Points	Player	Team	Date	Opponent	Series	Score	MP	FGM	FGA	FG%	3PM	3PA	3P%	FTM	FTA	FT%	TRB	AST	Notes	Ref.
1	63	Michael Jordan*	Chicago Bulls	April 20, 1986	Boston Celtics	1986 Eastern Conference First Round	131–135	53	22	41	53.7	0	0	0	19	21	90.5	5	6	(Note: Double overtime. Jordan scored 17 points in the first quarter, 6 points in the second quarter, 13 points in the third quarter, 18 points in the fourth quarter, 5 points in the first overtime and 4 points in the second overtime.)	
2	61	Elgin Baylor*	Los Angeles Lakers	April 14, 1962	Boston Celtics	1962 NBA Finals	126–121	48	22	46	47.8				17	19	89.5	22	1	(Note: NBA Finals single-game record. Most points in a playoff regulation game. 25 field goal attempts in the first half, tying the record. Baylor scored 18 points in the first quarter, 15 points in the second quarter, 13 points in the third quarter and 15 points in the fourth quarter.)	
3	57	Donovan Mitchell^	Utah Jazz	August 17, 2020	Denver Nuggets	2020 Western Conference First Round	125–135	43:14	19	33	57.6	6	15	40.0	13	13	100	9	7		
4	56	Wilt Chamberlain*	Philadelphia Warriors	March 22, 1962	Syracuse Nationals	1962 Eastern Division Semi-finals	121–104	48	22	48	45.8				12	22	54.5	35	1	(Note: Set playoff records for field goal attempts in a game (48) and in a half (25).)	
4	56	Michael Jordan* (2)	Chicago Bulls	April 29, 1992	Miami Heat	1992 Eastern Conference First Round	119–114	43	20	30	66.7	0	0	0	16	18	88.9	5	5	(Note: Miami took an 18-point lead before Jordan scored his first points. Jordan scored 54 points in the final three-quarters, setting a playoff record for most points in three-quarters; he scored 2 points in the first quarter, 17 points in the second quarter, 19 points in the third quarter and 18 points in the fourth quarter.)	
4	56	Charles Barkley*	Phoenix Suns	May 4, 1994	Golden State Warriors	1994 Western Conference First Round	140–133	41	23	31	74.2	3	4	75.0	7	9	77.8	14	4	(Note: Barkley's first quarter line: 11–11 fg, 3–3 3pt, 2–2 ft. 15 field goals made in the first half. Barkley scored his team's first 12 points. Barkley scored 27 points in the first quarter and 11 points in the second quarter.)	
4	56	Jimmy Butler^	Miami Heat	April 24, 2023	Milwaukee Bucks	2023 Eastern Conference First Round	119–114	40:45	19	28	67.9	3	8	37.5	15	18	83.3	9	2		
8	55	Rick Barry*	San Francisco Warriors	April 18, 1967	Philadelphia 76ers	1967 NBA Finals	130–124	46	22	48	45.8				11	19	57.9	12	5	(Note: Tied playoff single-game record for field goal attempts (48). 24 field goal attempts in each half.)	
8	55	Michael Jordan* (3)	Chicago Bulls	May 1, 1988	Cleveland Cavaliers	1988 Eastern Conference First Round	106–101	44	24	45	53.3	0	0	0	7	7	100	6	3	(Note: Tied playoff single-game record for field goals made. 25 field goal attempts in the first half, tying the playoff record. 14 field goals made in the first half. Jordan scored 12 points in the first quarter, 16 points in the second quarter, 15 points in the third quarter and 12 points in the fourth quarter. The second of consecutive 50+ point games in the playoffs by Jordan; becoming the only player in playoff history to do so.)	
8	55	Michael Jordan* (4)	Chicago Bulls	June 16, 1993	Phoenix Suns	1993 NBA Finals	111–105	46	21	37	56.8	0	1	0	13	18	72.2	8	4	(Note: 14 field goals made in the first half, tying the NBA Finals record. Jordan scored 11 points in the first quarter, 22 points in the second quarter, 10 points in the third quarter and 12 points in the fourth quarter.)	
8	55	Michael Jordan* (5)	Chicago Bulls	April 27, 1997	Washington Bullets	1997 Eastern Conference First Round	109–104	44:13	22	35	62.9	1	2	50.0	10	10	100	7	2		
8	55	Allen Iverson*	Philadelphia 76ers	April 20, 2003	New Orleans Hornets	2003 Eastern Conference First Round	98–90	46:40	21	32	65.6	3	5	60.0	10	11	90.9	4	8		
8	55	Damian Lillard^	Portland Trail Blazers	June 1, 2021	Denver Nuggets	2021 Western Conference First Round	140–147	51:44	17	24	70.8	12	17	70.6	9	10	90.0	6	10	(Note: Double overtime. Lillard broke the NBA playoff record for three pointers made and set a franchise record for number of points in a playoff game. He hit multiple clutch three-pointers at the end of regulation, the end of the first overtime, and during the second overtime to keep Portland competitive with Denver in the loss.)	
14	54	John Havlicek*	Boston Celtics	April 1, 1973	Atlanta Hawks	1973 Eastern Conference Semi-finals	134–109	48	24	36	66.7				6	6	100	9	6	(Note: Tied playoff single-game record for field goals made. 14 field goals made in the first half.)	
14	54	Michael Jordan* (6)	Chicago Bulls	May 31, 1993	New York Knicks	1993 Eastern Conference Finals	105–95	39	18	30	60.0	6	9	66.7	12	14	85.7	6	2	(Note: Jordan scored 17 points in the first quarter, 10 points in the second quarter, 18 points in the third quarter and 9 points in the fourth quarter.)	
14	54	Allen Iverson* (2)	Philadelphia 76ers	May 9, 2001	Toronto Raptors	2001 Eastern Conference Semi-finals	97–92	47:46	21	39	53.8	3	5	60.0	9	9	100	5	4		
17	53	Wilt Chamberlain* (2)	Philadelphia Warriors	March 14, 1960	Syracuse Nationals	1960 Eastern Division Semi-finals	132–112	47	24	42	57.1				5	16	31.3	22	2	(Note: Set playoff single-game record for field goals made.)	
17	53	Jerry West*	Los Angeles Lakers	April 23, 1969	Boston Celtics	1969 NBA Finals	120–118	46:00	21	41	51.2				11	13	84.6	3	10	(Note: West made two free throws with four seconds remaining in the game to secure the win.)	
17	53	Isaiah Thomas^{§}	Boston Celtics	May 2, 2017	Washington Wizards	2017 Eastern Conference Semi-finals	129–119	44:33	18	33	54.5	5	12	41.7	12	13	92.3	4	4		
17	53	Nikola Jokić^	Denver Nuggets	May 7, 2023	Phoenix Suns	2023 Western Conference Semi-finals	124–129	39:27	20	30	66.7	2	4	50.0	11	13	84.6	4	11		
21	52	Jerry West* (2)	Los Angeles Lakers	April 5, 1965	Baltimore Bullets	1965 Western Division Finals	118–115		16	38	42.1				20	21	95.2	5	9	(Note: 32 points in the second half. Missed his first free throw in the game, then made 20 in a row. West scored four points in the game's final 23 seconds to secure a come-from-behind win. 14 free throws made in a half, a playoff record at the time.)	
21	52	Allen Iverson* (3)	Philadelphia 76ers	May 16, 2001	Toronto Raptors	2001 Eastern Conference Semi-finals	121–88	43:29	21	32	65.6	8	14	57.1	2	2	100	2	7		
23	51	Sam Jones*	Boston Celtics	March 28, 1967	New York Knicks	1967 Eastern Division Semi-finals	118–109	43	19	30	63.3				13	17	76.5	4	1		
23	51	Sleepy Floyd	Golden State Warriors	May 10, 1987	Los Angeles Lakers	1987 Western Conference Semi-finals	129–121	44	18	26	69.2	2	3	66.7	13	14	92.9	3	10	(Note: 39 points in the second half, and 29 points in the fourth quarter, both playoff records. Also set a playoff record with 12 (all consecutive) field goals made in the fourth quarter. 15 field goals made in the second half.)	
23	51	Ray Allen*	Boston Celtics	April 30, 2009	Chicago Bulls	2009 Eastern Conference First Round	127–128	58:45	18	32	56.3	9	18	50.0	6	7	85.7	5	3	(Note: Triple overtime. Tied playoff single-game record for three-point field goals made. Set playoff single-game record for three-point field goal attempts.)	
23	51	Russell Westbrook^{†}	Oklahoma City Thunder	April 19, 2017	Houston Rockets	2017 Western Conference Quarterfinals	111–115	41:22	17	43	39.5	1	7	14.3	15	18	83.3	10	13		
23	51	LeBron James^	Cleveland Cavaliers	May 31, 2018	Golden State Warriors	2018 NBA Finals	114–124	47:32	19	32	59.4	3	7	42.9	10	11	90.9	8	8		
23	51	Donovan Mitchell^ (2)	Utah Jazz	August 23, 2020	Denver Nuggets	2020 Western Conference First Round	129–127	38:09	15	27	55.6	4	7	57.1	17	18	94.4	4	7	(Note: Both Mitchell and Denver's Jamal Murray scored at least 50 points during the game, the first time in NBA playoff history that two players in the same game did so.)	
23	51	Jayson Tatum^	Boston Celtics	May 14, 2023	Philadelphia 76ers	2023 Eastern Conference Semi-finals	112–88	41:40	17	28	60.7	6	10	60.0	11	14	78.6	13	5	(Note: Most points scored in a Game 7 in NBA history.)	
30	50	Bob Cousy*	Boston Celtics	March 21, 1953	Syracuse Nationals	1953 Eastern Division Semi-finals	111–105	66	10	22	45.5				30	32	93.8		2	(Note: Quadruple overtime. Set playoff single-game record for free throws made. Free throw attempts were also a playoff record at the time.)	
30	50	Bob Pettit*	St. Louis Hawks	April 12, 1958	Boston Celtics	1958 NBA Finals	110–109	42	19	34	55.9				12	15	80.0	19		(Note: Pettit scored 11 straight points, 19 of his team's last 21 points, and 19 points total in the fourth quarter.)	
30	50	Wilt Chamberlain* (3)	Philadelphia Warriors	March 22, 1960	Boston Celtics	1960 Eastern Division Finals	128–107	46	22	42	52.4				6	14	42.9	35	2		
30	50	Wilt Chamberlain* (4)	San Francisco Warriors	April 10, 1964	St. Louis Hawks	1964 Western Division Finals	121–97	45	22	32	68.8				6	10	60.0	15	6		
30	50	Billy Cunningham*	Philadelphia 76ers	April 1, 1970	Milwaukee Bucks	1970 Eastern Division Semi-finals	111–118	48	22	39	56.4				6	8	75.0	10	2		
30	50	Bob McAdoo*	Buffalo Braves	April 18, 1975	Washington Bullets	1975 Eastern Conference Semi-finals	108–102	45	20	32	62.5				10	14	71.4	21	1	(Note: McAdoo scored 15 points in the third quarter and another 15 points in the fourth quarter.)	
30	50	Dominique Wilkins*	Atlanta Hawks	April 19, 1986	Detroit Pistons	1986 Eastern Conference First Round	137–125	33	19	28	67.9	0	0	0	12	15	80.0	5	3		
30	50	Michael Jordan* (7)	Chicago Bulls	April 28, 1988	Cleveland Cavaliers	1988 Eastern Conference First Round	104–93	44	19	35	54.3	0	0	0	12	12	100	7	2	(Note: 13 field goals made in the first half. The first of back-to-back games of 50+ points; Jordan is the only player in history to record consecutive 50-point games in the playoffs. Jordan scored 9 points in the first quarter. Jordan outscored the entire opposing team 20–19 in the second quarter.)	
30	50	Michael Jordan* (8)	Chicago Bulls	May 5, 1989	Cleveland Cavaliers	1989 Eastern Conference First Round	105–108	43	14	28	50.0	0	1	0	22	27	81.5	3	4	(Note: Overtime. Jordan scored 19 points in the first half, 29 points in the second half (including 19 points in the third quarter and 10 points in the fourth quarter) and 2 points in overtime. 16 free throw attempts in the first half, a playoff record at the time.)	
30	50	Karl Malone*	Utah Jazz	April 22, 2000	Seattle SuperSonics	2000 Western Conference First Round	104–93	43:16	18	32	56.3	1	1	100	13	14	92.9	12	0	(Note: Oldest player (36 years, 273 days) to score 50 points in a playoff game.)	
30	50	Vince Carter*	Toronto Raptors	May 11, 2001	Philadelphia 76ers	2001 Eastern Conference Semi-finals	102–78	44:44	19	29	65.5	9	13	69.2	3	3	100	6	7	(Note: Carter tied the playoff single-game record for three-point field goals made. He set the playoff record with eight three-point field goals made in the first half. Carter scored 15 points in the first quarter and 19 points in the second quarter.)	
30	50	Kobe Bryant*	Los Angeles Lakers	May 4, 2006	Phoenix Suns	2006 Western Conference First Round	118–126	52:06	20	35	57.1	5	8	62.5	5	6	83.3	8	5	(Note: Scored 12 out of the Lakers' 13 in overtime. 38 before OT.)	
30	50	Dirk Nowitzki*	Dallas Mavericks	June 1, 2006	Phoenix Suns	2006 Western Conference Finals	117–101	43:29	14	26	53.8	5	6	83.3	17	18	94.4	12	3		
30	50	Damian Lillard^ (2)	Portland Trail Blazers	April 23, 2019	Oklahoma City Thunder	2019 Western Conference First Round	118–115	45:16	17	33	51.5	10	18	55.6	6	8	75.0	7	6		
30	50	Kevin Durant^	Golden State Warriors	April 26, 2019	Los Angeles Clippers	2019 Western Conference First Round	129–110	42:03	15	26	57.7	6	14	42.9	14	15	93.3	6	5		
30	50	Jamal Murray^	Denver Nuggets	August 23, 2020	Utah Jazz	2020 Western Conference First Round	127–129	43:09	18	31	58.1	9	15	60.0	5	5	100	11	7	(Note: Both Murray and Utah's Donovan Mitchell scored at least 50 points during the game, the first time in NBA playoff history that two players in the same game did so.)	
30	50	Jamal Murray^ (2)	Denver Nuggets	August 30, 2020	Utah Jazz	2020 Western Conference First Round	119–107	43:03	17	24	70.8	9	12	75.0	7	9	77.8	5	6		
30	50	Jayson Tatum^ (2)	Boston Celtics	May 28, 2021	Brooklyn Nets	2021 Eastern Conference First Round	125–119	40:31	16	30	53.3	5	11	45.5	13	15	86.7	6	7		
30	50	Giannis Antetokounmpo^	Milwaukee Bucks	July 20, 2021	Phoenix Suns	2021 NBA Finals	105–98	42	16	25	64	1	3	33.3	17	19	89.5	14	2	(Note: Title-clinching Game 6 of the 2021 NBA Finals.)	
30	50	Stephen Curry^	Golden State Warriors	April 30, 2023	Sacramento Kings	2023 NBA Western Conference First Round	120–100	37:41	20	38	52.6	7	18	38.9	3	5	60.0	8	6		
30	50	Joel Embiid^	Philadelphia 76ers	April 25, 2024	New York Knicks	2024 NBA Eastern Conference First Round	125–114	41	13	19	68.4	5	7	71.4	19	21	90.5	8	4		
30	50	Donovan Mitchell^ (3)	Cleveland Cavaliers	May 3, 2024	Orlando Magic	2024 Eastern Conference First Round	96–103	41:34	22	36	61.1	3	9	33.3	3	6	50.00	4	4		

== ABA playoff scoring leaders ==
During the nine-year lifespan of the American Basketball Association, five players achieved a 50-point game in the postseason.

Rank	Points	Player	Team	Date	Opponent	Series	Score	MP	FGM	FGA	FG%	3PM	3PA	3P%	FTM	FTA	FT%	TRB	AST	Notes	Ref.
1	53	Roger Brown	Indiana Pacers	May 19, 1970	Los Angeles Stars	1970 ABA Finals	142–120	47:00	18	29	62.1	3	8	.375	14	16	87.5	13	6	(Note: Most points scored by a Pacer in a playoff game.)	
1	53	Julius Erving	Virginia Squires	April 4, 1972	The Floridians	1972 Eastern Division Semifinals	118–113	50:00	22	29	.759	1	1	1.000	8	9	.889	14	6		
3	52	Rick Barry (1)	Washington Caps	April 28, 1970	Denver Rockets	1970 Western Division Semifinals	119–143	45:00	18	36	50.0	3	5	60.0	13	13	100.0	8		(Note: In addition to being a Nets franchise record for points in one postseason game, it also is the most points scored in a seventh and deciding game in professional basketball history (NBA/ABA).)	
4	51	George McGinnis	Indiana Pacers	April 12, 1975	San Antonio Spurs	1975 Western Division Semifinals	109–110	48:00	21	40	52.55	3	6	50.0	6	11	54.5	17	10		
5	50	Rick Barry (2)	New York Nets	April 1, 1972	Kentucky Colonels	1972 Eastern Division Semifinals	122–108	48:00	18	31	58.1	0	3	0.0	14	14	100.0	6	2		

== See also ==
- List of NBA single-game scoring leaders
