= Wali Jones =

American basketball player (born 1942)

Personal information
- Born: February 14, 1942 (age 84) Philadelphia, Pennsylvania, U.S.
- Listed height: 6 ft 2 in (1.88 m)
- Listed weight: 180 lb (82 kg)

Career information
- High school: Overbrook (Philadelphia, Pennsylvania)
- College: Villanova (1961–1964)
- NBA draft: 1964: 3rd round, 18th overall pick
- Drafted by: Detroit Pistons
- Playing career: 1964–1976
- Position: Point guard / Shooting guard
- Number: 24, 23, 12, 11, 9

Career history
- 1964–1965: Baltimore Bullets
- 1965–1971: Philadelphia 76ers
- 1971–1973: Milwaukee Bucks
- 1974–1975: Utah Stars
- 1975–1976: Detroit Pistons
- 1976: Philadelphia 76ers

Career highlights
- NBA champion (1967); NBA All-Rookie First Team (1965); No. 24 retired by Villanova Wildcats; Third-team All-American – UPI (1964); 2× Robert V. Geasey Trophy winner (1963, 1964)

Career ABA and NBA statistics
- Points: 6,672 (9.8 ppg)
- Rebounds: 1,471 (2.2 rpg)
- Assists: 2,099 (3.1 apg)
- Stats at NBA.com
- Stats at Basketball Reference

Walter (Wali) Jones (born February 14, 1942) is an American former professional basketball player. He was a 6 ft 2 in (1.88 m) 180 lb (82 kg) guard in the National Basketball Association (NBA) and American Basketball Association (ABA), who was drafted by the Detroit Pistons in 1964, and played for the Baltimore Bullets, Philadelphia 76ers, Milwaukee Bucks, Utah Stars, and Detroit Pistons. He was the point guard on the 1966–1967 Philadelphia 76ers NBA championship team that is considered one of the greatest teams in NBA history, playing an instrumental role in winning the championship finals. He later became a scout with the 76ers.

Jones played college basketball for the Villanova University Wildcats. Jones was the team captain, who controlled the offense as a pass-first player, while also averaging nearly 17 points per game in his three varsity seasons. He received the Philadelphia Big 5 Player of the Year Award (the Robert V. Geasey Trophy) in both 1963 and 1964. As a senior, he was voted Villanovan of the Year, a school wide award open to all students and not just athletes. His Villanova teams went to the NCAA University Division basketball tournament twice, with Jones named to the All-East Region tournament team both times.

While still in the NBA, Jones helped create organizations that aimed at teaching drug use prevention and positive character development to youth; work he continued for decades after his retirement in various communities across the United States. Among other places, he did this public service work in Philadelphia, San Antonio, and South Florida. Jones worked in the Miami Heat organization from 1989 to 2009 as a director and then vice president of community relations, developing programs that reached tens of thousands of children. He also worked as a scout for the Heat.

Jones was born in Philadelphia, where he has been honored for his longstanding community work in West Philadelphia. In 2023, a mural of Jones was unveiled in Philadelphia's Mantua neighborhood. Jones's 106-year-old father, Earnest Jones, was present for the ceremony.

== Early life ==
Jones was born on February 14, 1942, in Philadelphia, and raised in the Mantua neighborhood of West Philadelphia by Dorothea and Earnest Jones. Jones's father taught him to be an independent thinker, and at a young age taught Jones interior and exterior decorating so he always would have a trade and could earn a living. He was exposed to gangs as an adolescent, but turned to playing basketball on local courts, where he received direction and positive concern, and people like Guy Rodgers and Wilt Chamberlain were models to him.

He played basketball at Overbrook High School, the same school that had produced basketball legend and future Hall of Fame center Chamberlain a few years earlier (who later became Jones's NBA teammate in Philadelphia). Jones's Overbrook High teams won Philadelphia Public League championships in 1958 and 1959. He was an All-Public League player. His high school teammates included future NBA player and UCLA head coach Walt Hazzard (Mahdi Abdul-Rahman), future NBA and ABA player Wayne Hightower, and future college basketball player Ralph Heyward. Jones would work out after school with Hazzard, under the supervision of future Hall of Fame coach John Chaney, who was their gym teacher at Overbrook.

== College career ==
Jones played college basketball under coach Jack Kraft for the Villanova University Wildcats. The Villanova team was noted for its excellent defense, with Jones as its team captain, star player, team "quarterback" on offense, and a pass-first player. He played every game in his junior season with an injured knee that later required surgery. One of Jones's teammates was future NBA and ABA player, and future Philadelphia 76ers teammate, Bill Melchionni. During Jones's three seasons with the Wildcats, the team had a 64–21 record and played in the NCAA University Division basketball tournament twice.

Villanova had a 21–7 record in Jones's sophomore season (1961–62), with Jones averaging 17.1 points and 4.9 rebounds per game. Villanova was selected to play in the 1962 NCAA University Division basketball tournament. The Wildcats defeated the West Virginia Mountaineers, 90–75, in the first round of the East Region tournament. Jones had 27 points, five rebounds, and two assists in that game. Villanova then won the East Region semifinal, 79–76, over the New York University Violets; Jones scoring 14 points and collecting four rebounds. Villanova lost to Wake Forest, 79–69, in the East Region finals; Jones leading the Wildcats with 25 points. He was named to the All-East Region tournament team.

As a junior (1962–63), Jones led the 19–10 Wildcats with a 16.8 points per game average. In his senior season, the Wildcats were 24–4, and ranked seventh nationally in the final Associated Press college basketball poll that season. Jones led the team with a 16.5 points per game average. Villanova was again selected to play in the NCAA tournament. The Wildcats defeated Providence in the first round of the East Region tournament, with Jones having 17 points, seven assists, and six rebounds. They lost to Duke in the semifinals, where Jones had 18 points, three assists, and six rebounds. Villanova then defeated Princeton and Bill Bradley for third place in the East Region, Jones leading all scorers with 34 points in that game. He was named to the All-East Region tournament team for a second time.

Jones averaged 16.8 points and 4.4 rebounds per game over his three years on the varsity. Jones earned the Philadelphia Big 5 Player of the Year award (the Robert V. Geasey Trophy) for 1963 and 1964, and was named a third-team All-American as a senior by United Press International. He was voted Villanovan of the Year, a school wide award open to all students and not just athletes.

== Professional career ==
The Detroit Pistons selected Jones in the third round of the 1964 NBA draft, 20th overall. Before ever playing for the Pistons, Jones was traded along with fellow rookie Les Hunter and veterans Bailey Howell (a future Hall of Fame inductee), Don Ohl, and Bob Ferry to the Baltimore Bullets for Terry Dischinger, Rod Thorn, and Don Kojis.

=== Baltimore Bullets ===
In his first NBA season for the Bullets, Jones was named to the first-team 1964–65 NBA All-Rookie Team. He averaged 16.2 minutes, 5.3 points, 2.6 assists, and 1.8 rebounds per game as a reserve guard, on a team that included starting guards Kevin Loughery and Don Ohl, and future Hall of Fame players Walt Bellamy and Gus Johnson. After agreeing to contract terms with Jones in early September 1965 the following season, the team was unable to locate him. In late September 1965, still unable to communicate with Jones, the Bullets traded him to the Philadelphia 76ers for Johnny Kerr; with the provision that if Jones did not join the 76ers, the Bullets would provide alternative compensation. Jones did join the 76ers for the start of the 1965–66 season; and would play for Philadelphia over the next six years. After joining the 76ers, Jones was reported as saying he had been "'out West, seeking seclusion'" and it had always been his intention to return for the upcoming NBA season.

=== Philadelphia 76ers ===
In his first season with the 76ers (1965–66), Jones became the team's primary starting point guard averaging 27.5 minutes, nine points, 3.4 assists, and 2.1 rebounds per game; playing in 80 games. The team also included future Hall of Famers Wilt Chamberlain (center), Hal Greer (shooting guard), Chet Walker (small forward) and rookie Billy Cunningham (sixth man, small forward); as well as power forward Luke Jackson. Jones replaced Larry Costello, who had been the 76ers' starting point guard the prior season until a severe hamstring injury that caused him to miss a number of games at the end of the 1964–65 season, and all of the 1965–66 season (after announcing his retirement).

Jones and Greer were the starting guards on the NBA title-winning 1966–67 76ers team that also featured Chamberlain, Walker, Jackson, Cunningham, and fellow Villanovan Bill Melchionni. The 35-year old Costello had significantly recovered from his injury and rejoined the team in September 1966, coach Alex Hannum envisioning him as an important backup to Jones and Greer. Costello and Jones were roommates that season. During the season, Costello alternated with Jones at point guard; but Jones' playing time increased after Costello tore his Achilles tendon on January 6, 1967. Jones played in 81 regular season games, averaging 27.8 minutes, 13.2 points, 3.7 assists, and 3.3 rebounds per game.

The 76ers finished the season 68–13, winning the Eastern Division. The 68 wins were an NBA record at the time. They won the first round of the NBA playoffs in four games (3–1) over the Cincinnati Royals. Jones averaged 11.3 points, 3.3 assists, and 2.5 rebounds per game. The 76ers then defeated the Boston Celtics four games to one in the Eastern Division finals. Jones averaged 32 minutes, 19.4 points, 3.2 assists, and 2.2 rebounds per game in that series. The Celtics had won 10 consecutive Eastern Division finals and eight consecutive NBA championships before the 76ers defeated them in 1967.

Jones then played a key role during the 1967 NBA Finals against the San Francisco Warriors. In Game 1 of the series, Jones scored 30 points, grabbed 10 rebounds, and recorded eight assists during a 141–135 overtime win over the Warriors. The 76ers had been up by 19 points during the game, but the Warriors came back to tie the game, sending it to overtime. Jones was described as the "chief reason the 76ers didn't collapse completely". In the championship clinching Game 6, Jones led the Sixers with 27 points (Chamberlain had 24); scoring 16 points in the first quarter. He also had six assists. Over the series, Jones averaged 33.7 minutes, 20.2 points, 5.3 assists, and 3.5 rebounds per game. The 1966–67 Philadelphia 76ers are considered one of the greatest teams in NBA history.

The 76ers were 62–20 the following season, again winning the Eastern Division. Jones averaged 26.7 minutes, 12.8 points, 3.2 assists, and 2.8 rebounds per game. The 76ers defeated the New York Knicks in six games to win the Eastern Conference semifinals; however, Cunningham suffered a broken arm in Game 3 and did not play in the ensuing Eastern Division finals. Jones averaged 31.3 minutes, 15.2 points, 3.2 assists, and 2.5 rebounds per game against the Knicks. Before the first game of the Eastern Division finals against the Boston Celtics, news broke of the assassination of Martin Luther King Jr. Several 76ers, including Jones and Chamberlain, were vocally opposed to playing the game; however, they were outvoted by the rest of the team, a decision Jones regrets. The 76ers lost the series in seven games. Jones averaged 28.4 minutes, 13.1 points, 2.9 assists, and 2.3 rebounds per game.

The 76ers traded Chamberlain before the start of the 1968–69 season to the Los Angeles Lakers for Archie Clarke, Darrall Imhoff, Jerry Chambers and cash, and Hannum was replaced by Jack Ramsay as head coach. The 76ers went 55–27, finishing second in the Eastern Division. Jones averaged career-highs of 28.9 minutes and 13.2 points per game; along with 3.6 assists and 3.1 rebounds per game. The 76ers lost the Eastern Conference semifinals to the Celtics in five games, with Clarke and Greer at starting guards in that series. Jones was a reserve behind Greer and Clarke in the 1969–70 season, averaging 22.3 minutes, 11.8 points, 3.5 assists, and 2.2 rebounds per game. The Milwaukee Bucks defeated the 76ers in five games to win the Eastern Conference semifinals; with Jones averaging 32 minutes, 15.8 points, 4.8 assists, and 2.2 rebounds per game in the series.

Jones played in the first 18 games of the 1970–71 season, before a knee injury suffered in mid-November against the Knicks prevented him from playing. He did not return until early February 1971; missing 41 games. On the season, Jones appeared in 41 games, starting 13; averaging 23.5 minutes, 10.1 points, 3.1 assists, and 1.6 rebounds per game. The 76ers lost the Eastern Conference semifinals to the Baltimore Bullets in seven games. Jones played in all seven games as a reserve, averaging 16.4 minutes and 6.9 points per game in the series.

Going into the 1971–72 season, the 76ers and Jones were in a contract dispute over his salary. It was reported in December 1971 that the 76ers had wanted Jones to take a 25 percent pay reduction that Jones refused to accept, and he held out; becoming the first player in 76ers history to remain a holdout once the season started. In September, it had been reported that the 76ers offered Jones the same salary he made the previous season. The 76ers suspended Jones for holding out. Using the services of attorney Richie Phillips, Jones brought a lawsuit against the NBA, each of its teams, and NBA commissioner J. Walter Kennedy, seeking $5 million. In mid-December 1971, the 76ers traded Jones to the Milwaukee Bucks for future considerations. Jones was satisfied with the salary offered by the Bucks, joined the team, and dismissed the lawsuit. Jones relates that the Sixers told him he was too "militant", in connection with trading him to the Bucks.

=== Milwaukee Bucks, Utah Stars, Detroit Pistons, and 76ers ===
Jones played 48 games for the Bucks during the 1971–72 season under head coach Larry Costello, his former teammate in Philadelphia. Jones averaged 21.5 minutes, 7.5 points, 2.9 assists, and 1.6 rebounds per game. Jones played in only 27 games the following season (1972–73). The Bucks reportedly first put Jones on a medical suspension in mid-December 1972, because of an alleged loss of weight and stamina; later stating the suspension was also disciplinary. The Bucks sought to waive Jones in January 1973. Richie Phillips, again representing Jones, filed a grievance with commissioner Kennedy and took the position that Jones's contract required the Bucks to keep him on the team through the end of the season, and to pay him for the duration of the contract.

It was reported that the Bucks had been told by several people that Jones was involved in drug usage, even hiring private detectives to investigate, while Jones staunchly denied the accusations; stating the matter was based on "'hearsay and conjecture'". At the same time, Jones also prominently served in a variety of ways promoting drug use prevention among youth; even testifying before Congress on the subject. One teammate said at the time that the team and Jones agreed to a drug test, which was negative; and Jones likewise said he agreed to drug testing which came back negative. Ultimately, Jones reached a settlement with the Bucks in May 1973 for nearly his full salary over the remaining 2½ years of his contract, and Jones accepted his release by the Bucks, becoming a free agent. Jones also believed that anti-drug work he did interacting with people at the street level created an issue with both the Bucks and the 76ers in how they perceived him; and their discomfort with having him on their teams. Despite all of these difficulties, in 1994 Jones recollected the strong and lasting relationships that he developed with his Bucks' teammates like Oscar Robertson, Bob Dandridge, Kareem Abdul-Jabbar, Lucius Allen, and Jon McGlockin, and said "'A lot of good things happened to me in Milwaukee'".

The events with the Bucks put a cloud over Jones, and he did not play in the 1973–1974 season. He joined the ABA's Utah Stars for the 1974–1975 season, averaging nearly 19 minutes and 7.5 points per game. He was signed as a free agent the following season by the Detroit Pistons on December 17, 1975, but was waived on January 28, 1976. He signed as a free agent with the 76ers on February 27, 1976, and played in his final 16 NBA games as a 76er; averaging nearly 10 minutes and three points per game. The 76ers waived Jones two days before the start of the 1976–77 season; and he spent the next six seasons as a scout for the 76ers.

During his playing days, Jones had the nickname "Wali Wonder". He was known for his unusual "jackknife" style jump shot; which he had developed as a child because he did not have the strength to shoot a normal style jump shot. His former teammate and coach Larry Costello said that he could not really understand how Jones could successfully make his shots using the unusual mechanics.

== Legacy and honors ==
In 2012, he was inducted into the Philadelphia Sports Hall of Fame. In 2016, the 1966–67 Philadelphia 76ers were inducted into the Philadelphia Sports Hall of Fame as a team. In 2022, he was inducted into the Philadelphia Black Basketball Hall of Fame. In 2022, a group of present and former Philadelphia Inquirer sports writers ranked Jones as the twenty-first greatest 76er of all time.

As a child, future NBA Hall of Famer Magic Johnson idolized Jones.

== Public service ==
Early in his life, Jones realized it was his life's work to serve young people. On January 1, 1974, he participated in a summit to address violence among Philadelphia street gangs, sponsored by Falaka Fattah and the House of Umoja, aimed to stop gang violence in Philadelphia. The conference included representatives from the city's gangs, who were needed to make a commitment to stop using violence against each other.

While still playing for the Philadelphia 76ers, in 1969 Jones co-founded Concerned Athletes in Action (CAIA) along with Walt Hazzard. CAIA ran youth camps and drug-prevention clinics in urban Black communities; and worked to address gang violence. This later became Shoot for the Stars, that also included a focus on working to prevent gun violence. Fellow Philadelphia Sports Hall of Fame inductee Ken Hamilton works with Jones on Shoot for the Stars.

In the early 1980s, Jones moved to San Antonio, and lived there for seven or eight years. By this time, Jones had obtained a degree in educational psychology. He had a degree in economics, but in 1971 he began studying educational psychology under Dr. Russell Cassell at the University of Wisconsin-Milwaukee. In San Antonio, Jones became involved with a program to help children stay in school; and then later with the "All-Star Program", a drug use prevention program also aimed at teaching older children how to help younger children in developing positive behaviors; ranging in age from high school to elementary school. In September 1986, he and others associated with the All-Star Program were honored for their work by the San Antonio Department of Education's Center for Educational Development. He worked as a trainer for the Center for Educational Development for eight years.

In 1989, Jones became the Miami Heat's director of community relations and two years later was promoted to vice president. His focus remained on drug use prevention and developing positive behaviors among youth. At the time he joined the Heat, former teammate Billy Cunningham was one of the team's owners. Jones had originally approached Cunningham and his co-owner about the Heat's implementing programs Jones had helped create, and the team's owners decided to hire him. Among his contributions, Jones developed Shoot for the Stars, Stay in School, and Excellence in Academics programs for the Heat. Jones described his work as "human development training". During his time with the Heat, these programs reached tens of thousands of students; and were also established in jails and detention centers. Jones also worked as a scout for the Heat. He was with the Heat organization until 2009.

In 2023, a mural of Jones was unveiled in Philadelphia at 37th and Mt. Vernon Streets in the Mantua neighborhood, at Hub Playground; honoring his service to the West Philadelphia community. Jones's 106-year-old father, Earnest Jones, was present for the ceremony. In 2024, Jones was honored by Philadelphia Legacies for his work with Shoot for the Stars.

== Personal life ==
During his playing years, Jones strongly expressed his identity as an African American. He also converted to Islam and changed his name to Wali after joining the Bucks, a decision influenced by teammate Kareem Abdul-Jabbar and Jones's study of Islam. He said "'The change really helped me in my whole life . . . It helped me find my niche in life as far as helping kids'".

Jones' son Askia is the fourth-leading scorer in Kansas State University basketball history (as of 2024) and played briefly in the NBA himself, with the Minnesota Timberwolves. He also played professionally in Venezuela and Brazil. His daughter Sundaa Ayo went to Georgetown University and then graduate school at the University of Pittsburgh to study international relations. His son Kahhar went to Coppin State University, and another son Mukit went to West Virginia State University.

== Career statistics ==
Legend
GP	Games played	GS	Games started	MPG	Minutes per game
FG%	Field goal percentage	3P%	3-point field goal percentage	FT%	Free throw percentage
RPG	Rebounds per game	APG	Assists per game	SPG	Steals per game
BPG	Blocks per game	PPG	Points per game	**Bold**	Career high
†	Won an NBA championship	*	Led the league

=== NBA ===
==== Regular season ====
Year	Team	GP	GS	MPG	FG%	3P%	FT%	RPG	APG	SPG	BPG	PPG
1964–65	Baltimore	77	–	16.2	.375	–	.728	1.8	2.6	–	–	5.3
1965–66	Philadelphia	80*	–	27.5	.370	–	.744	2.1	3.4	–	–	9.0
1966–67†	Philadelphia	**81***	–	27.8	.431	–	.838	**3.3**	**3.7**	–	–	**13.2**
1967–68	Philadelphia	77	–	26.7	.397	–	.787	2.8	3.2	–	–	12.8
1968–69	Philadelphia	**81**	–	**28.9**	.430	–	.809	3.1	3.6	–	–	**13.2**
1969–70	Philadelphia	78	–	22.3	.430	–	.841	2.2	3.5	–	–	11.8
1970–71	Philadelphia	41	–	23.5	.402	–	.782	1.6	3.1	–	–	10.1
1971–72	Milwaukee	48	–	21.5	.407	–	.822	1.6	2.9	–	–	7.5
1972–73	Milwaukee	27	–	15.5	.407	–	**.889**	1.1	2.1	–	–	5.0
1975–76	Detroit	1	–	19.0	.364	–	.000	0.0	2.0	**2.0**	0.0	8.0
1975–76	Philadelphia	16	–	9.8	**.500**	–	.692	0.6	1.9	0.3	0.0	2.9
Career		607	–	23.8	.409	–	.800	2.3	3.2	0.4	0.0	10.1

==== Playoffs ====
Year	Team	GP	GS	MPG	FG%	3P%	FT%	RPG	APG	SPG	BPG	PPG
1964–65	Baltimore	10	–	16.2	.460	–	.750	2.0	1.8	–	–	7.3
1965–66	Philadelphia	5	–	31.2	.325	–	.682	3.0	3.6	–	–	13.0
1966–67†	Philadelphia	**15***	–	31.7	.447	–	.776	2.8	4.1	–	–	**17.5**
1967–68	Philadelphia	13	–	29.8	.358	–	.789	2.4	3.0	–	–	14.1
1968–69	Philadelphia	5	–	20.6	.267	–	.800	**3.2**	1.8	–	–	6.4
1969–70	Philadelphia	5	–	**32.0**	**.523**	–	.786	2.2	**4.8**	–	–	15.8
1970–71	Philadelphia	7	–	16.4	.365	–	.769	1.7	1.6	–	–	6.9
1971–72	Milwaukee	9	–	22.2	.439	–	**.857**	2.0	2.2	–	–	10.0
1975–76	Philadelphia	1	–	2.0	.000	–	.000	1.0	2.0	0.0	0.0	0.0
Career		70	–	25.2	.406	–	.777	2.4	2.9	0.0	0.0	11.9

=== ABA ===
==== Regular season ====
Year	Team	GP	GS	MPG	FG%	3P%	FT%	RPG	APG	SPG	BPG	PPG
1974–75	Utah	**71**	–	**18.9**	**.405**	**.240**	**.823**	**1.1**	**2.1**	**0.6**	0.0	**7.5**
Career		71	–	18.9	.405	.240	.823	1.1	2.1	0.6	0.0	7.5

==== Playoffs ====
Year	Team	GP	GS	MPG	FG%	3P%	FT%	RPG	APG	SPG	BPG	PPG
1974–75	Utah	**5**	–	**9.2**	**.381**	.000	**1.000**	**0.4**	**0.8**	**0.8**	0.0	**4.4**
Career		5	–	9.2	.381	.000	1.000	0.4	0.8	0.8	0.0	4.4
