= Dave Deutsch =

American basketball player

Personal information
- Born: April 13, 1945 (age 81) Brooklyn, New York, U.S.
- Listed height: 6 ft 1 in (1.85 m)
- Listed weight: 170 lb (77 kg)

Career information
- High school: Flushing (Flushing, New York)
- College: Rochester (1962–1966)
- NBA draft: 1966: 12th round, 98th overall pick
- Drafted by: New York Knicks
- Position: Guard
- Number: 3

Career history
- 1966–1967: New York Knicks
- Stats at NBA.com
- Stats at Basketball Reference

David Deutsch (born May 13, 1945) is an American professional basketball player who spent one season in the National Basketball Association (NBA) with the New York Knicks during the 1966–67 season. The Knicks drafted him during the 1966 NBA draft in the 12^{th} round (98^{th} overall) from the University of Rochester.

Deutsch was described as "publicity shy" in a 2000 letter written by a Rochester classmate who cited it as the reason for a lack of collegiate recognition.

== Career statistics ==
Legend
GP	Games played	GS	Games started	MPG	Minutes per game
FG%	Field goal percentage	3P%	3-point field goal percentage	FT%	Free throw percentage
RPG	Rebounds per game	APG	Assists per game	SPG	Steals per game
BPG	Blocks per game	PPG	Points per game	**Bold**	Career high

=== NBA ===
==== Regular season ====
Year	Team	GP	GS	MPG	FG%	FT%	RPG	APG	PPG
1966–67	New York	19	0	4.9	.167	.450	1.1	.8	1.1

==== Playoffs ====
Year	Team	GP	MPG	FG%	FT%	RPG	APG	PPG
1967	New York	1	7.0	.200	–	3.0	1.0	2.0
