= Henry Akin =

American basketball player (1944–2020)

Personal information
- Born: July 31, 1944 Detroit, Michigan, U.S.
- Died: February 16, 2020 (aged 75) Kirkland, Washington, U.S.
- Listed height: 6 ft 10 in (2.08 m)
- Listed weight: 225 lb (102 kg)

Career information
- High school: Troy (Troy, Michigan)
- College: Morehead State (1963–1965)
- NBA draft: 1966: 2nd round, 11th overall pick
- Drafted by: New York Knicks
- Playing career: 1966–1968
- Position: Power forward / center
- Number: 10

Career history
- 1966–1967: New York Knicks
- 1967–1968: Seattle SuperSonics
- 1968: Kentucky Colonels

Career highlights
- 2× First-team All-OVC (1964, 1965)

Career NBA and ABA statistics
- Points: 308 (3.5 ppg)
- Rebounds: 181 (2.1 rpg)
- Assists: 40 (0.5 apg)
- Stats at NBA.com
- Stats at Basketball Reference

Henry Troutt Akin Jr. (July 31, 1944 – February 16, 2020) was an American professional basketball player. He played college basketball for the Morehead State Eagles where he was a two-time first-team all-conference player in 1964 and 1965. Akin left the team before his senior season when he met his future wife and returned to his home state of Michigan. The New York Knicks had scouted Akin during his college career and selected him as the 11th overall pick in the 1966 NBA draft. He played one season with the Knicks and was then selected by the Seattle SuperSonics in the 1967 NBA expansion draft. Akin was a member of the SuperSonics during their inaugural season but was forced to retire due to knee and ankle injuries. He worked as a scout for the SuperSonics after his retirement.

== Early life and college career ==
Akin was born in Detroit, Michigan, as one of two children to Henry and Adda Akin. He was raised in Troy, Michigan, and attended Troy High School. Akin grew from 6 ft 1 in (1.85 m) as a sophomore to 6 ft 9 in (2.06 m) as a senior. He also played baseball at the school and graduated in 1962. Akin committed to play college basketball for the Morehead State Eagles over scholarship offers from the Oregon State Beavers and Ferris State Bulldogs. He was selected to the All-Ohio Valley Conference first-team as a sophomore and junior with the Eagles. Akin did not return for his senior season after he met his future wife and returned to Detroit where he married her and worked for an elevator installation company.

Akin moved with his wife to Hattiesburg, Mississippi, through a family connection to attend William Carey College to play basketball during the 1966–67 season. He played on a traveling Amateur Athletic Union team that dominated opponents in Mississippi, Alabama and Louisiana. In May 1966, Akin received an offer to tryout for the New York Knicks of the National Basketball Association (NBA). The team's scout, Red Holzman, had watched Akin play for the Eagles and was interested in him.

== Professional career ==
Akin was selected by the Knicks as the 11th overall pick of the 1966 NBA draft. He spent his rookie season with the Knicks and averaged 3.8 points per game. Akin was chosen by the Seattle SuperSonics in the 1967 NBA expansion draft for their inaugural season. He played in a pickup game in Detroit with his high school friends where he suffered a knee injury that required surgery; Akin made it through the 1967–68 season by taking cortisone shots. He appeared in 36 games for the SuperSonics during which he averaged 3.1 points per game. Akin was waived by the SuperSonics after the season because of a debilitating ankle injury. He played two games with the Kentucky Colonels of the American Basketball Association (ABA) and then decided to retire.

== Post-playing career ==
Akin returned to Seattle when he was contacted by SuperSonics general manager Dick Vertlieb and head coach Al Bianchi who offered him the position of scout for the team. He estimated that he watched between 200 and 250 basketball games a year during his five years in the position. Akin left the role in 1974 when his first daughter was born. He worked as a salesman for a plus-size clothing company and then spent 22 years at Boeing before his retirement in 2010.

== Personal life ==
Akin was married to his wife for 54 years and had three daughters. He regularly attended girls basketball games at Shorecrest High School where one of his daughters was an assistant coach.

Akin suffered from heart disease for most of his adult life and underwent open-heart surgery in 2011. After three weeks of hospice care, Akin died on February 16, 2020, in Kirkland, Washington. His cause of death was listed as heart and kidney failure.

== Career statistics ==
Legend
GP	Games played	GS	Games started	MPG	Minutes per game
FG%	Field goal percentage	3P%	3-point field goal percentage	FT%	Free throw percentage
RPG	Rebounds per game	APG	Assists per game	SPG	Steals per game
BPG	Blocks per game	PPG	Points per game	**Bold**	Career high

=== NBA/ABA ===
==== Regular season ====
Year	Team	GP	MPG	FG%	3P%	FT%	RPG	APG	PPG
1966–67	New York (NBA)	**50**	9.1	**.361**		**.703**	**2.4**	**.5**	**3.8**
1967–68	Seattle (NBA)	36	7.2	.336		.645	1.6	.4	3.1
1968–69	Kentucky (ABA)	2	**12.5**	.250	.000	.667	2.0	**.5**	2.0
Career		88	8.4	.350	.000	.676	2.1	.5	3.5

==== Playoffs ====
Year	Team	GP	MPG	FG%	FT%	RPG	APG	PPG
1967	New York (NBA)	2	8.0	.143	.500	4.0	.0	1.5
