= Douglass Junior and Senior High School =

- U.S. National Register of Historic Places
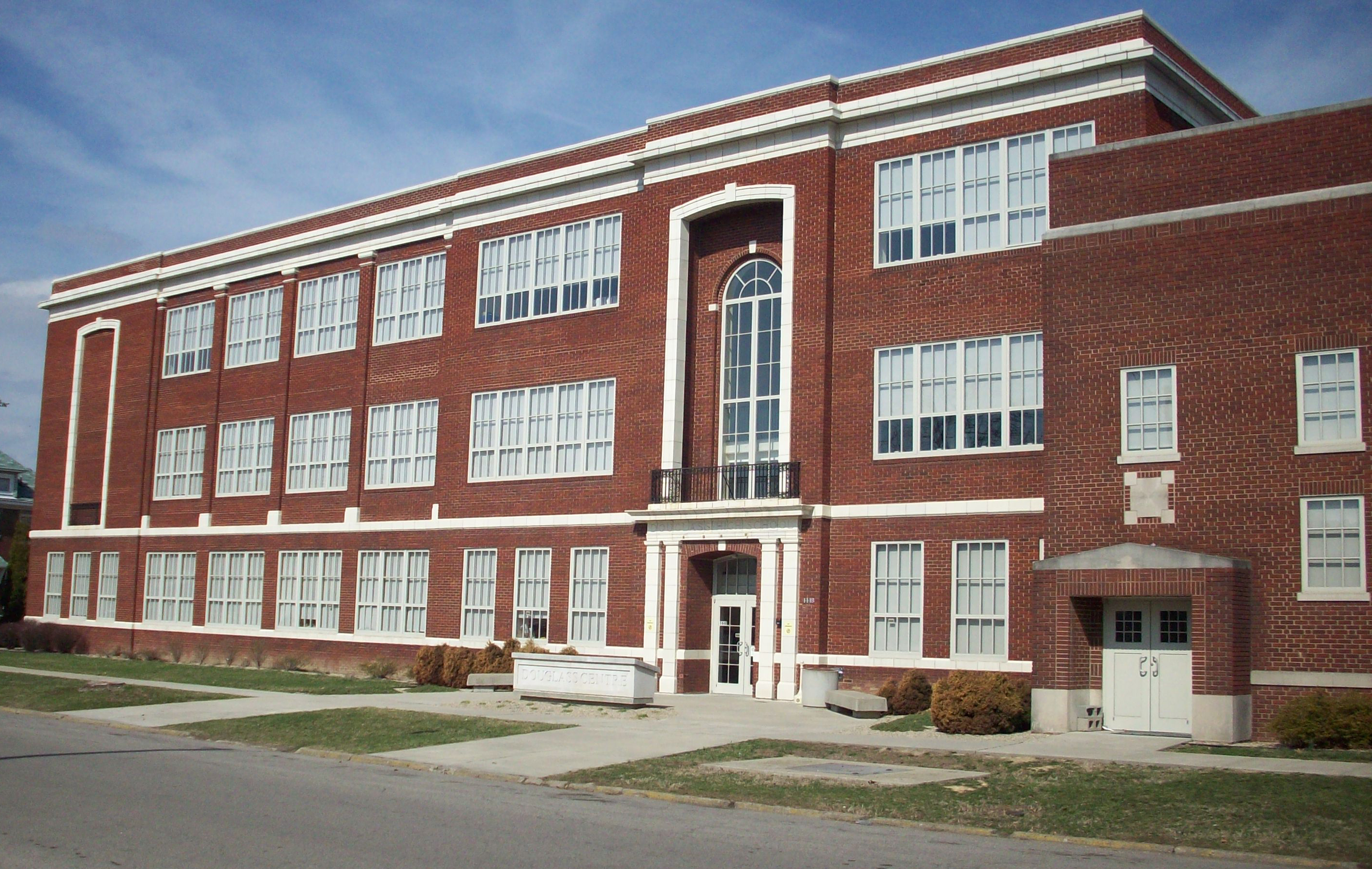
- Douglass Junior and Senior High School, March 2009

- Location within West Virginia Location within the United States
- Location: Tenth Ave. and Bruce St., Huntington, West Virginia
- Coordinates: 38°24′52″N 82°25′53″W
- Area: 0.8 acres (0.32 ha)
- Built: 1924
- Architect: Bates, Frampton & Bowers
- NRHP reference No.: 85003091
- Added to NRHP: December 5, 1985

Douglass Junior and Senior High School is a historic school building located at Huntington, Cabell County, West Virginia. Built in 1924, it was the segregation-era high school for African Americans in the city, and replaced the earlier Douglass school building which had been built in 1891, and was named after abolitionist Frederick Douglass. The school is a three-story building measuring 113 feet wide and 230 feet long. It is built of red brick, with terra cotta trim, and rests on a concrete foundation. It closed as a school in 1961, but continued to be used as a school for special education until 1981. After that it housed educational offices. It now serves as a community center named the "Douglass Community Center".

It was listed on the National Register of Historic Places in 1985.

== School ==
Douglass Junior and Senior High School

Information
- Former name: Douglass High School
- Type: Public, segregated
- Founded: 1924
- Closed: 1961
- Last updated: 30 December 2017

=== Notable alumni ===
- Hal Greer (1936–2018) – First African American athlete at Marshall University. He was a long time star with the Philadelphia 76ers
- Carter G. Woodson (1875–1950) – graduated in 1895, from Douglass High School and later served as the school's principal; predecessor school of Douglass Junior and Senior High School.

=== Notable faculty ===
- Ira De Augustine Reid, prominent Sociologist who led the Atlanta University department after W. E. B. Du Bois.

== See also ==
- National Register of Historic Places listings in Cabell County, West Virginia
