= 1966–67 Baltimore Bullets season =

NBA professional basketball team season

- Head coach: Mike Farmer; Buddy Jeannette; Gene Shue
- Arena: Baltimore Civic Center

Results
- Record: 20–61 (.247)
- Place: Division: 5th (Eastern)
- Playoff finish: Did not qualify
- Stats at Basketball Reference

Local media
- Television: WTTG
- Radio: WFBR

The 1966–67 Baltimore Bullets season was the Bullets' 6th season in the NBA and 4th season in the city of Baltimore.

== Roster ==
1966–67 Baltimore Bullets roster
Players

Pos.	No.	Player	Height	Weight	DOB	From
SG	34	John Austin	6 ft 0 in (1.83 m)	170 lb (77 kg)	August 31, 1944	Boston College
PG	35	John Barnhill	6 ft 1 in (1.85 m)	180 lb (82 kg)	March 20, 1938	Tennessee State
C	31	Mel Counts	7 ft 0 in (2.13 m)	230 lb (104 kg)	October 16, 1941	Oregon State
PG	11	Johnny Egan	5 ft 11 in (1.80 m)	180 lb (82 kg)	January 31, 1939	Providence
C	44	LeRoy Ellis	6 ft 10 in (2.08 m)	210 lb (95 kg)	March 10, 1940	St. John's
PF	12	Bob Ferry	6 ft 8 in (2.03 m)	230 lb (104 kg)	1937-05-31	Saint Louis
PF	24	Johnny Green	6 ft 5 in (1.96 m)	200 lb (91 kg)	December 8, 1933	Michigan State
PF	20	Wayne Hightower	6 ft 8 in (2.03 m)	192 lb (87 kg)	1940-01-14	Kansas
SF	25	Gus Johnson	6 ft 6 in (1.98 m)	230 lb (104 kg)	December 13, 1938	Idaho
SG	22	Kevin Loughery	6 ft 3 in (1.91 m)	190 lb (86 kg)	March 28, 1940	St. John's
SF	15	Jack Marin	6 ft 7 in (2.01 m)	200 lb (91 kg)	October 12, 1944	Duke
PG	10	Don Ohl	6 ft 3 in (1.91 m)	190 lb (86 kg)	April 18, 1936	Illinois
PF	31	Ray Scott	6 ft 9 in (2.06 m)	215 lb (98 kg)	July 12, 1938	Portland
SF	33	Ben Warley	6 ft 5 in (1.96 m)	200 lb (91 kg)	September 4, 1936	Tennessee State

Coaches
Head coach
- Mike Farmer
  Buddy Jeannette
  Gene Shue

Legend
- (DP) Unsigned draft pick
- (FA) Free agent
- (S) Suspended
- Injured

Roster

== Regular season ==
=== Season standings ===
Eastern Division	W	L	PCT	GB	Home	Road	Neutral	Div
x-Philadelphia 76ers	68	13	.840	–	28–2	26–8	14–3	28–8
x-Boston Celtics	60	21	.741	8	27–4	25–11	8–6	30–6
x-Cincinnati Royals	39	42	.481	29	20–11	12–24	7–7	14–22
x-New York Knicks	36	45	.444	32	20–15	9–24	7–6	11–25
Baltimore Bullets	20	61	.247	48	12–20	3–30	5–11	7–29

- x – clinched playoff spot

=== Game log ===
1966–67 game log
#	Date	Opponent	Score	High points	Record
1	October 15	Los Angeles	126–115	Gus Johnson (36)	0–1
2	October 19	New York	131–109	Kevin Loughery (29)	0–2
3	October 21	@ Boston	91–111	Don Ohl (21)	0–3
4	October 22	Philadelphia	141–112	Green, Johnson (14)	0–4
5	October 25	@ Philadelphia	110–130	LeRoy Ellis (22)	0–5
6	October 26	Cincinnati	116–122	Don Ohl (28)	1–5
7	October 28	San Francisco	105–104	Gus Johnson (33)	1–6
8	October 29	@ Detroit	97–103	Kevin Loughery (27)	1–7
9	November 2	@ Chicago	94–102	LeRoy Ellis (22)	1–8
10	November 4	@ Los Angeles	98–131	Bob Ferry (16)	1–9
11	November 6	@ San Francisco	117–120	Gus Johnson (30)	1–10
12	November 8	@ Los Angeles	104–102	Kevin Loughery (39)	2–10
13	November 9	@ San Francisco	122–128	Johnny Egan (26)	2–11
14	November 11	Cincinnati	119–104	Gus Johnson (26)	2–12
15	November 12	@ New York	124–134	Gus Johnson (22)	2–13
16	November 17	Chicago	102–120	Gus Johnson (20)	3–13
17	November 18	@ Boston	119–143	Johnny Green (22)	3–14
18	November 19	Boston	147–125	Don Ohl (31)	3–15
19	November 20	@ Cincinnati	123–125	Don Ohl (39)	3–16
20	November 22	N San Francisco	117–125	Kevin Loughery (29)	4–16
21	November 23	N San Francisco	120–110	Kevin Loughery (27)	4–17
22	November 25	Philadelphia	129–115	Ellis, Johnson, Ohl (23)	4–18
23	November 26	@ New York	114–125	Kevin Loughery (25)	4–19
24	November 30	Los Angeles	126–111	Gus Johnson (17)	4–20
25	December 3	Philadelphia	137–120	Gus Johnson (24)	4–21
26	December 7	San Francisco	106–116	Gus Johnson (34)	5–21
27	December 8	N Chicago	132–120	Don Ohl (24)	5–22
28	December 10	@ New York	129–138	Gus Johnson (28)	5–23
29	December 13	N Chicago	94–122	Kevin Loughery (24)	6–23
30	December 14	New York	106–116	Kevin Loughery (30)	7–23
31	December 16	@ Detroit	121–113	Kevin Loughery (35)	8–23
32	December 17	Chicago	110–106	Don Ohl (27)	8–24
33	December 18	@ Cincinnati	114–138	LeRoy Ellis (17)	8–25
34	December 21	N St. Louis	118–109	LeRoy Ellis (23)	8–26
35	December 25	Detroit	129–127 (OT)	Don Ohl (43)	8–27
36	December 26	@ Chicago	96–108	Don Ohl (29)	8–28
37	December 27	@ St. Louis	111–113	Don Ohl (30)	8–29
38	December 28	San Francisco	138–115	Don Ohl (24)	8–30
39	December 30	N New York	130–115	Ellis, Loughery (22)	8–31
40	January 3	N Detroit	117–110	Don Ohl (26)	8–32
41	January 4	Detroit	132–126 (2OT)	Don Ohl (33)	8–33
42	January 6	@ Philadelphia	115–121 (OT)	Loughery, Ohl (21)	8–34
43	January 7	@ New York	126–129	Don Ohl (27)	8–35
44	January 8	Cincinnati	126–94	Johnny Green (15)	8–36
45	January 12	St. Louis	116–137	Don Ohl (41)	9–36
46	January 13	N Detroit	119–118	Don Ohl (30)	9–37
47	January 14	Boston	115–106	Don Ohl (25)	9–38
48	January 16	N St. Louis	98–100	Don Ohl (24)	10–38
49	January 19	Cincinnati	118–122	Don Ohl (31)	11–38
50	January 20	@ Boston	117–129	Johnny Egan (22)	11–39
51	January 21	Los Angeles	119–126	Gus Johnson (29)	12–39
52	January 22	@ Chicago	114–118	Gus Johnson (22)	12–40
53	January 24	@ San Francisco	125–146	Gus Johnson (23)	12–41
54	January 25	@ Los Angeles	115–128	LeRoy Ellis (28)	12–42
55	January 27	@ San Francisco	116–143	Gus Johnson (24)	12–43
56	January 28	@ Los Angeles	118–133	Gus Johnson (29)	12–44
57	February 1	Boston	111–107	Don Ohl (24)	12–45
58	February 2	N Cincinnati	131–125	Kevin Loughery (27)	12–46
59	February 4	Cincinnati	99–109	Don Ohl (27)	13–46
60	February 6	N St. Louis	98–107	Kevin Loughery (26)	14–46
61	February 7	N St. Louis	109–96	Kevin Loughery (28)	14–47
62	February 8	N Los Angeles	121–108	Gus Johnson (27)	14–48
63	February 9	N Boston	124–128	Gus Johnson (28)	15–48
64	February 11	Philadelphia	133–139	Kevin Loughery (35)	16–48
65	February 17	St. Louis	133–132	Ellis, Loughery (27)	16–49
66	February 18	N Detroit	118–113	Gus Johnson (26)	16–50
67	February 19	@ Detroit	131–104	Ray Scott (30)	17–50
68	February 22	Boston	135–120	Johnny Egan (23)	17–51
69	February 24	N Philadelphia	149–118	LeRoy Ellis (28)	17–52
70	February 25	@ New York	114–116	Kevin Loughery (28)	17–53
71	February 26	Chicago	106–124	John Barnhill (24)	18–53
72	March 1	St. Louis	112–122	John Barnhill (27)	19–53
73	March 4	@ Cincinnati	102–109	Ray Scott (24)	19–54
74	March 5	@ St. Louis	103–132	Ray Scott (22)	19–55
75	March 8	@ Detroit	113–120	Ray Scott (37)	19–56
76	March 10	@ Chicago	115–132	Gus Johnson (30)	19–57
77	March 12	@ Boston	118–123	Ray Scott (31)	19–58
78	March 15	New York	114–121	Kevin Loughery (29)	20–58
79	March 17	Los Angeles	135–133	Ray Scott (28)	20–59
80	March 18	@ Philadelphia	119–135	Gus Johnson (27)	20–60
81	March 19	Philadelphia	132–129	Gus Johnson (28)	20–61

== Awards and records ==
- Jack Marin, NBA All-Rookie Team 1st Team
