= 1966–67 New York Knicks season =

Season of National Basketball Association team the New York Knicks

- Head coach: Dick McGuire
- General manager: Eddie Donovan
- Arena: Madison Square Garden

Results
- Record: 36–45 (.444)
- Place: Division: 4th (Eastern)
- Playoff finish: East Division semifinals (lost to Celtics 1–3)
- Stats at Basketball Reference

Local media
- Television: WOR-TV
- Radio: WHN (Don Criqui)

The 1966–67 New York Knicks season was the 21st season for the team in the National Basketball Association (NBA). In the regular season, the Knicks finished in fourth place in the Eastern Division with a 36–45 record. In their first full season under head coach Dick McGuire, they secured their first playoff berth in eight years. New York lost in the opening round of the playoffs to the Boston Celtics, three games to one.

== NBA draft ==
Note: This is not an extensive list; it only covers the first and second rounds, and any other players picked by the franchise that played at least one game in the league.

Round	Pick	Player	Position	Nationality	School/Club team
1	1	Cazzie Russell	G/F	United States	Michigan
2	11	Henry Akin	F/C	United States	Morehead State
8	69	Mike Silliman	F	United States	Army
9	78	Bill Turner	F	United States	Akron
12	98	Dave Deutsch	G	United States	Rochester

== Roster ==
1966–67 New York Knicks roster
Players

Pos.	No.	Player	Height	Weight	DOB	From
SG	12	Dick Barnett	6 ft 4 in (1.93 m)	190 lb (86 kg)	1936–10–02	Tennessee State
C	19	Willis Reed	6 ft 9 in (2.06 m)	235 lb (107 kg)	1942–06–25	Grambling State
SF	33	Cazzie Russell	6 ft 5 in (1.96 m)	218 lb (99 kg)	1944–06–07	Michigan

Coaches
Head coach
- Vince Boryla

Legend
- (DP) Unsigned draft pick
- (FA) Free agent
- (S) Suspended
- Injured

== Regular season ==
=== Season standings ===
Eastern Division	W	L	PCT	GB	Home	Road	Neutral	Div
x-Philadelphia 76ers	68	13	.840	–	28–2	26–8	14–3	28–8
x-Boston Celtics	60	21	.741	8	27–4	25–11	8–6	30–6
x-Cincinnati Royals	39	42	.481	29	20–11	12–24	7–7	14–22
x-New York Knicks	36	45	.444	32	20–15	9–24	7–6	11–25
Baltimore Bullets	20	61	.247	48	12–20	3–30	5–11	7–29

x – clinched playoff spot

=== Game log ===
1966–67 game log
#	Date	Opponent	Score	High points	Record
1	October 15	@ Philadelphia	112–128	Dave Stallworth (24)	0–1
2	October 18	Los Angeles	119–122	Walt Bellamy (25)	1–1
3	October 19	@ Baltimore	131–109	Howard Komives (28)	2–1
4	October 22	Boston	126–97	Cazzie Russell (20)	2–2
5	October 23	@ Chicago	124–105	Howard Komives (24)	3–2
6	October 26	@ Los Angeles	133–122	Howard Komives (32)	4–2
7	October 28	@ Los Angeles	114–124	Walt Bellamy (28)	4–3
8	November 2	@ Cincinnati	129–131	Willis Reed (38)	4–4
9	November 3	San Francisco	108–123	Walt Bellamy (27)	5–4
10	November 5	Detroit	104–115	Willis Reed (32)	6–4
11	November 8	St. Louis	135–121	Willis Reed (29)	6–5
12	November 9	@ Chicago	103–98	Em Bryant (21)	7–5
13	November 11	@ Boston	106–111	Bellamy, Reed (27)	7–6
14	November 12	Baltimore	124–134	Dave Stallworth (34)	8–6
15	November 15	Philadelphia	113–109	Bellamy, Reed (17)	8–7
16	November 16	@ Philadelphia	108–117	Walt Bellamy (20)	8–8
17	November 17	N Detroit	108–123	Willis Reed (32)	8–9
18	November 19	Chicago	104–116	Willis Reed (19)	9–9
19	November 22	Cincinnati	121–118	Willis Reed (26)	9–10
20	November 23	@ Detroit	100–118	Willis Reed (23)	9–11
21	November 25	N Cincinnati	109–115	Dick Van Arsdale (22)	9–12
22	November 26	Baltimore	114–125	Cazzie Russell (34)	10–12
23	November 29	Los Angeles	114–118	Howard Komives (26)	11–12
24	November 30	@ Cincinnati	119–115	Walt Bellamy (32)	12–12
25	December 2	@ St. Louis	107–109	Willis Reed (26)	12–13
26	December 3	Boston	120–109	Willis Reed (23)	12–14
27	December 6	San Francisco	126–116	Howard Komives (31)	12–15
28	December 7	@ Detroit	118–116	Barnett, Bellamy (26)	13–15
29	December 9	@ Philadelphia	107–112	Walt Bellamy (26)	13–16
30	December 10	Baltimore	129–138	Willis Reed (26)	14–16
31	December 13	Philadelphia	127–112	Walt Bellamy (22)	14–17
32	December 14	@ Baltimore	106–116	Walt Bellamy (23)	14–18
33	December 17	St. Louis	114–116	Dick Barnett (35)	15–18
34	December 21	@ Chicago	107–110	Willis Reed (28)	15–19
35	December 25	Chicago	132–133	Walt Bellamy (28)	16–19
36	December 26	@ Detroit	114–109	Howard Komives (29)	17–19
37	December 28	Los Angeles	115–121	Willis Reed (29)	18–19
38	December 30	N Baltimore	130–115	Dick Barnett (31)	19–19
39	December 31	Cincinnati	103–107	Walt Bellamy (32)	20–19
40	January 1	@ St. Louis	105–128	Howard Komives (20)	20–20
41	January 3	Philadelphia	148–142 (OT)	Willis Reed (30)	20–21
42	January 5	N Philadelphia	104–112	Walt Bellamy (29)	21–21
43	January 7	Baltimore	126–129	Willis Reed (35)	22–21
44	January 8	N Los Angeles	121–118	Dick Barnett (25)	23–21
45	January 12	@ San Francisco	123–127	Dick Barnett (33)	23–22
46	January 13	N San Francisco	117–119	Dick Barnett (30)	24–22
47	January 15	@ Chicago	116–131	Dick Barnett (30)	24–23
48	January 17	@ Philadelphia	111–119	Barnett, Bellamy, Russell (18)	24–24
49	January 19	N San Francisco	123–102	Dick Barnett (21)	24–25
50	January 21	@ St. Louis	124–114	Willis Reed (26)	25–25
51	January 22	@ St. Louis	101–104	Walt Bellamy (21)	25–26
52	January 24	Cincinnati	126–118	Willis Reed (21)	25–27
53	January 25	@ Cincinnati	125–132	Barnett, Reed (22)	25–28
54	January 28	Boston	114–112	Dick Van Arsdale (23)	25–29
55	January 29	@ Boston	106–141	Cazzie Russell (22)	25–30
56	January 31	St. Louis	120–139	Willis Reed (30)	26–30
57	February 1	@ Detroit	101–104	Walt Bellamy (34)	26–31
58	February 3	N Detroit	124–111	Willis Reed (31)	27–31
59	February 4	Detroit	101–102	Willis Reed (34)	28–31
60	February 7	Los Angeles	122–117	Dick Barnett (27)	28–32
61	February 8	N Chicago	106–103	Dick Barnett (26)	29–32
62	February 10	N Chicago	122–121	Dick Barnett (31)	30–32
63	February 11	San Francisco	122–125 (OT)	Dick Barnett (26)	31–32
64	February 13	N St. Louis	139–109	Willis Reed (18)	31–33
65	February 15	@ Cincinnati	118–127	Dick Barnett (21)	31–34
66	February 16	St. Louis	120–121	Willis Reed (25)	32–34
67	February 18	Cincinnati	123–124	Dave Stallworth (35)	33–34
68	February 21	Boston	143–114	Dick Van Arsdale (24)	33–35
69	February 22	N Chicago	103–117	Cazzie Russell (21)	33–36
70	February 23	@ Boston	117–122	Walt Bellamy (27)	33–37
71	February 25	Baltimore	114–116	Reed, Russell (26)	34–37
72	February 28	San Francisco	123–127	Willis Reed (24)	35–37
73	March 1	@ Detroit	101–118	Willis Reed (22)	35–38
74	March 3	@ Los Angeles	132–138	Walt Bellamy (29)	35–39
75	March 4	N San Francisco	111–102	Dick Van Arsdale (20)	35–40
76	March 5	@ San Francisco	115–103	Willis Reed (43)	36–40
77	March 7	Los Angeles	131–119	Willis Reed (25)	36–41
78	March 12	Philadelphia	131–120	Walt Bellamy (34)	36–42
79	March 15	@ Baltimore	114–121	Walt Bellamy (32)	36–43
80	March 18	Boston	140–123	Walt Bellamy (24)	36–44
81	March 19	@ Boston	113–124	Bellamy, Komives (22)	36–45

== Playoffs ==
1967 playoff game log
Division semifinals: 1–3 (home: 0–2; road: 1–1)

Game	Date	Team	Score	High points	High rebounds	High assists	Location Attendance	Series
1	March 21	@ Boston	L 110–140	Willis Reed (23)	Walt Bellamy (10)	Dick Van Arsdale (8)	Boston Garden; 8,632	0–1
2	March 25	Boston	L 108–115	Willis Reed (30)	Willis Reed (21)	Howard Komives (6)	Madison Square Garden III; 10,009	0–2
3	March 26	@ Boston	W 123–112	Willis Reed (38)	Bellamy, Reed (16)	Howard Komives (5)	Boston Garden; 10,738	1–2
4	March 28	Boston	L 109–118	Freddie Crawford (26)	Walt Bellamy (20)	Freddie Crawford (6)	Madison Square Garden III; 17,173	1–3

1967 schedule

== Awards and records ==
- Willis Reed, All-NBA Second Team
- Cazzie Russell, NBA All-Rookie Team 1st Team
