= Hal Greer =

American basketball player (1936–2018)

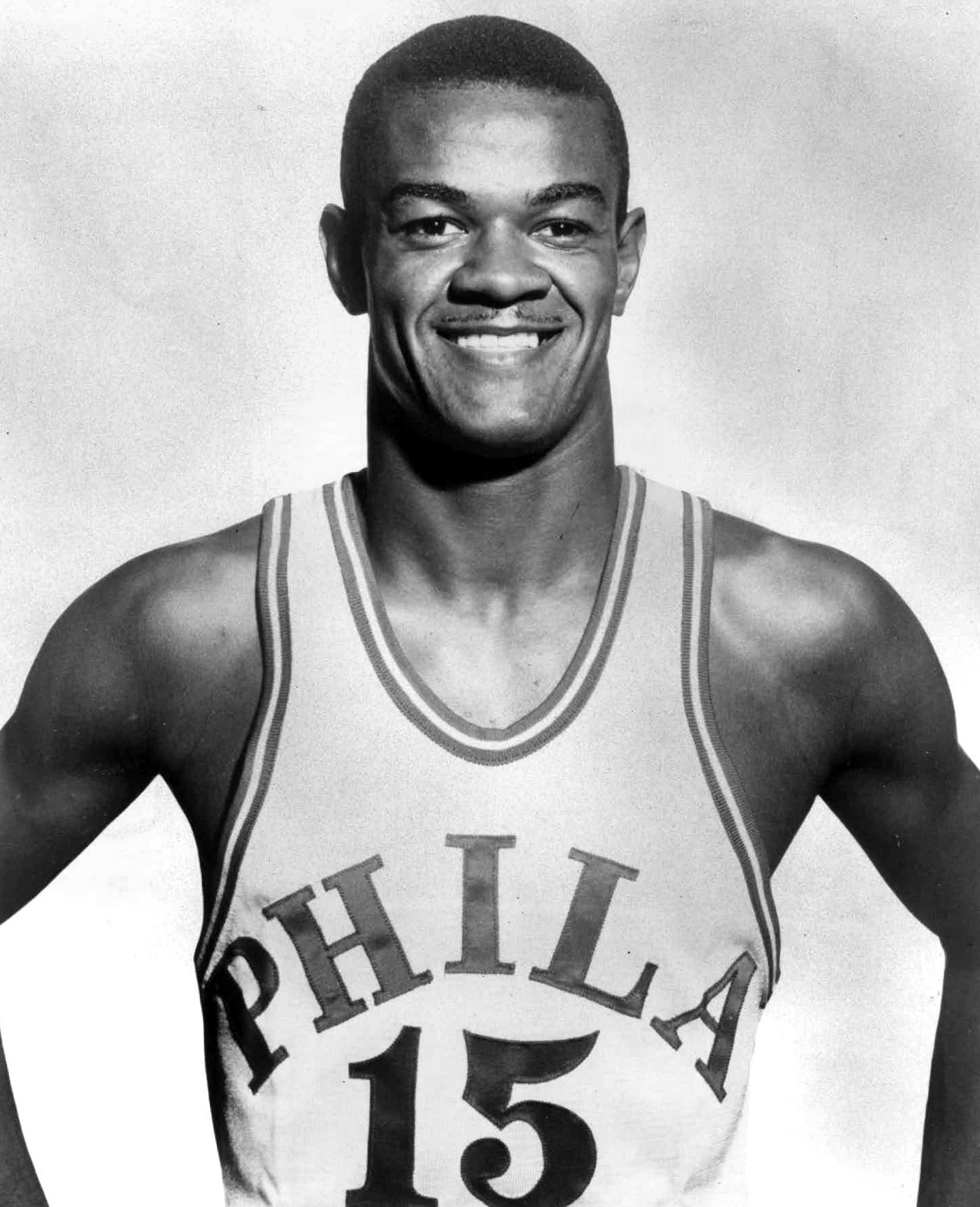
- Greer with the Philadelphia 76ers in 1969

Personal information
- Born: June 26, 1936 Huntington, West Virginia, U.S.
- Died: April 14, 2018 (aged 81) Phoenix, Arizona, U.S.
- Listed height: 6 ft 2 in (1.88 m)
- Listed weight: 175 lb (79 kg)

Career information
- High school: Douglass (Huntington, West Virginia)
- College: Marshall (1955–1958)
- NBA draft: 1958: 2nd round, 13th overall pick
- Drafted by: Syracuse Nationals
- Playing career: 1958–1973
- Position: Shooting guard / point guard
- Number: 15

Career history

Playing
- 1958–1973: Syracuse Nationals / Philadelphia 76ers

Career highlights
- NBA champion (1967); 10× NBA All-Star (1961–1970); NBA All-Star Game MVP (1968); 7× All-NBA Second Team (1963–1969); No. 15 retired by Philadelphia 76ers; NBA anniversary team (50th, 75th); First-team All-MAC (1958); No. 16 retired by Marshall Thundering Herd

Career statistics
- Points: 21,586 (19.2 ppg)
- Rebounds: 5,665 (5.0 rpg)
- Assists: 4,540 (4.0 apg)
- Stats at NBA.com
- Stats at Basketball Reference
- Basketball Hall of Fame
- Collegiate Basketball Hall of Fame

Harold Everett Greer (/ˈhæl ˈɡrɪər/ HAL GREER; June 26, 1936 – April 14, 2018) was an American professional basketball player and coach. He played for the Syracuse Nationals / Philadelphia 76ers of the National Basketball Association (NBA) from 1958 through 1973. A guard, Greer was a 10-time NBA All-Star and was named to the All-NBA Second Team seven times. He was named to the 50 Greatest Players in NBA History, the NBA 75th Anniversary Team, and his uniform number was among Philadelphia 76ers retired numbers. Greer is a member of the Basketball Hall of Fame.

== Early life and education ==
Born in Huntington, West Virginia, Greer attended Douglass Junior and Senior High School in Huntington. Douglass was an all-black school. He played as a guard for Douglass' men's basketball team. He enrolled at Marshall University and played college basketball for the Marshall Thundering Herd's basketball team, becoming the first African American to play for a public college in West Virginia.

Hal's attendance at Marshall University (College at the time) did not cause great uproar from the community, but more rumblings and a general uneasiness. The local newspapers gave Greer and his family casual treatment in deference to him and his family. At the first basketball practice in October 1954, all eyes were on Greer who showed out. Coach Cam Henderson reportedly told sportswriters in attendance that, "Before that young man is through here he'll become one of the greatest players in Marshall history and one of the greatest in the country."

With the Thundering Herd, Greer scored 1,377 points with a .545 field goal percentage, setting a Marshall record. In 1956, Marshall won the Mid-American Conference championship, and made their first NCAA men's basketball tournament appearance. Greer was named All-Mid-American Conference in 1957 and 1958. He was named an All-American in 1958 as well. Greer finished his Marshall career averaging 19.4 points per game and 10.8 rebounds per game. In 1958, his senior year, Greer averaged 23.6 points per game. Greer also played for the school's baseball team in his sophomore year as a first baseman.

== Professional career ==
=== Syracuse Nationals / Philadelphia 76ers (1958–1973) ===
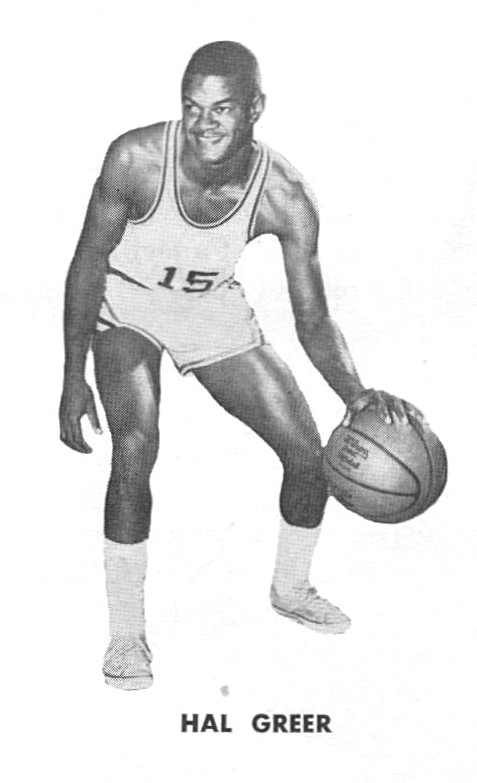
Greer scored 21,586 points during his 15-season career with the Philadelphia 76ers.

The Syracuse Nationals selected Greer with the 13th selection in the 1958 NBA draft. Greer played for Syracuse for five seasons, raising his scoring average to 22.8 points a game in 1961. He was selected for the NBA All-Star team that year.

In 1963, the Syracuse Nationals moved to Philadelphia to become the Philadelphia 76ers. There, Greer teamed with Wilt Chamberlain on the 1966–67 team that won the NBA championship. In the 76ers' 15 playoff games that season, Greer averaged a team-best 27.7 points. Greer had an unusual but highly effective free throw technique, shooting a jump shot from the charity stripe. He is usually considered the third-best guard of the 1960s, behind Oscar Robertson and fellow West Virginia native Jerry West.

Greer played in 10 NBA All-Star Games and was the MVP of the 1968 game when he went 8-for-8 from the field and scored 21 points, a record-breaking 19 in one quarter. He also was chosen to the All-NBA Second Team seven times, and scored 21,586 points during his NBA career. When he retired after the 1972–73 season, he ranked as the all-time leader in games played and was in the top ten in both points scored and field goals made. As of his death, Greer is the franchise record holder for points scored, field goals, field goal attempts, games played, and minutes played.

== Post-playing career ==
In the offseason of 1973, Greer was not signed by the 76ers nor any other team despite not wishing to retire. He spent his subsequent spare time playing golf. In December 1973, Greer entered discussions with the Cherry Hill Rookies of the Eastern Basketball Association (EBA) to join the team as head coach. On January 4, 1974, Greer was announced as head coach and joined the team with a 1–8 record. The Rookies finished the season with a 4–21 record. Greer was replaced as head coach by Pete Monska before the 1974–75 season.

In 1980, Greer was part of a group that purchased the Philadelphia Arena in West Philadelphia in an effort to revitalize the wider community. The group renamed the Arena in honor of Martin Luther King Jr. and relocated Lancaster's Continental Basketball League team to the arena which they named the Philadelphia Kings. Greer served as the Kings' coach and general manager. He led the team to a 17–23 record during the 1980–81 season. Greer also coached the basketball team for Germantown Academy in Fort Washington, Pennsylvania.

== Legacy ==
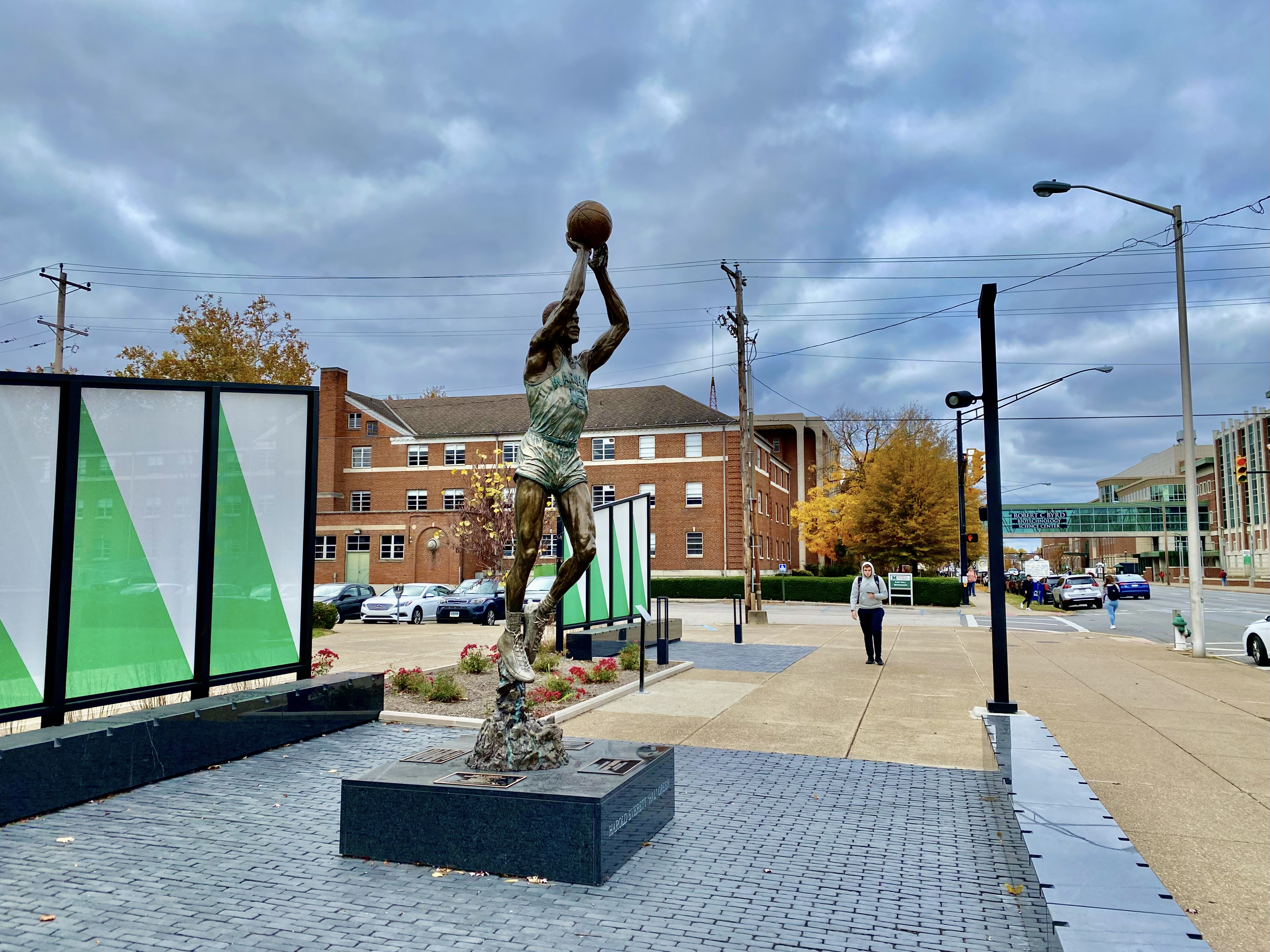
A statue of Hal Greer on the campus of Marshall University in 2022

Greer's hometown has honored his success by holding "Hal Greer Day" in 1966, and by renaming 16th Street, which carries West Virginia Route 10 as the main artery between the campus/downtown area and Interstate 64, as "Hal Greer Boulevard" in 1978.

In 1976, the Philadelphia 76ers retired Greer's uniform number, No. 15; he was the first 76ers' player in franchise history to have his jersey number retired. Marshall's men's basketball team retired Greer's No. 16. Marshall University inducted Greer into its Athletics Hall of Fame for his career in basketball and baseball in 1985.

In 1982, Greer was inducted into the Naismith Memorial Basketball Hall of Fame along with Slater Martin, Frank Ramsey, Willis Reed, coach Clarence Gaines, and contributor Alva Duer. Greer is recognized as one of the first African-American athletes enshrined in a major sports hall of fame from West Virginia. He was named one of the 50 Greatest Players in NBA History in 1996. The 76ers installed a statue of Greer at their training complex in 2017.

In 2021, Greer was honored at Marshall University with the dedication of a bronze statue created in his likeness and an unveiling ceremony with many of his family members in attendance. The statue is located adjacent to the Cam Henderson Center, the home of Marshall basketball, and was placed on a marble base surrounded by four benches and newly planted trees. Two weeks later, he was announced as part of the NBA 75th Anniversary Team. To commemorate the NBA's 75th Anniversary The Athletic ranked their top 75 players of all time, and named Greer as the 70th greatest player in NBA history.

== Accolades ==
- Averaged 22 ppg to lead 76ers to NBA Championship (1967)
- Played in 10 consecutive NBA All-Star Games (1961–70)
- NBA All-Star Game MVP (1968)
- Set record for most points scored in a quarter (19) during an All-Star Game (1968)
- Seven-time All-NBA Second Team (1963–69)
- Scored 21,586 career points (40th all-time), including 50 in one game vs. Boston Celtics
- Scored 1,876 points in 92 playoff games and 120 points in 10 All-Star Games
- His jerseys were retired by Marshall University (#16) and the Philadelphia 76ers (#15)

== Personal life ==
Greer and his wife, Mayme, had a son and two daughters. Greer died on April 14, 2018, in Phoenix, Arizona, following a brief illness. The 76ers announced his death on April 16. They honored Greer prior to Game 2 of the 2018 NBA Playoffs against the Miami Heat. For the remainder of the playoffs, the Sixers wore a black armband on the sleeve of their jersey with a small patch with the number 15.

== NBA career statistics ==
Legend
GP	Games played	GS	Games started	MPG	Minutes per game
FG%	Field goal percentage	3P%	3-point field goal percentage	FT%	Free throw percentage
RPG	Rebounds per game	APG	Assists per game	SPG	Steals per game
BPG	Blocks per game	PPG	Points per game	**Bold**	Career high
†	Won an NBA championship

=== Regular season ===
Year	Team	GP	MPG	FG%	FT%	RPG	APG	PPG
1958–59	Syracuse	68	23.9	.454	.778	2.9	1.5	11.1
1959–60	Syracuse	70	28.3	.476	.783	4.3	2.7	13.2
1960–61	Syracuse	79	35.0	.451	.774	5.8	3.8	19.6
1961–62	Syracuse	71	38.1	.447	.819	**7.4**	4.4	22.8
1962–63	Syracuse	80	32.9	.464	**.834**	5.7	3.4	19.5
1963–64	Philadelphia	80	39.5	.444	.829	6.1	4.7	23.3
1964–65	Philadelphia	70	37.1	.433	.811	5.1	4.5	20.2
1965–66	Philadelphia	80	**41.6**	.445	.804	5.9	4.8	22.7
1966–67†	Philadelphia	80	38.6	.459	.788	5.3	3.8	22.1
1967–68	Philadelphia	**82**	39.8	**.478**	.769	5.4	4.5	**24.1**
1968–69	Philadelphia	**82**	40.4	.459	.796	5.3	5.0	23.1
1969–70	Philadelphia	80	37.8	.455	.815	4.7	**5.1**	22.0
1970–71	Philadelphia	81	37.8	.431	.805	4.5	4.6	18.6
1971–72	Philadelphia	81	29.8	.449	.774	3.3	3.9	11.8
1972–73	Philadelphia	38	22.3	.392	.821	2.8	2.9	5.6
Career		1122	35.5	.452	.801	5.0	4.0	19.2
All-Star		10	20.7	.461	.703	4.5	2.8	12.0

=== Playoffs ===
Year	Team	GP	MPG	FG%	FT%	RPG	APG	PPG
1959	Syracuse	9	30.8	.419	.813	5.2	2.2	11.6
1960	Syracuse	3	28.0	**.512**	.750	4.7	3.3	15.7
1961	Syracuse	8	29.0	.387	.825	4.1	2.4	14.4
1962	Syracuse	1	5.0	—	—	0.0	0.0	0.0
1963	Syracuse	5	42.8	.506	.829	5.4	4.2	23.4
1964	Philadelphia	5	42.2	.389	.846	5.6	**6.0**	21.4
1965	Philadelphia	11	**45.9**	.455	.793	**7.4**	5.0	24.6
1966	Philadelphia	5	45.2	.352	.783	7.2	4.2	16.4
1967†	Philadelphia	**15**	**45.9**	.429	.797	5.9	5.3	**27.7**
1968	Philadelphia	13	42.5	.432	**.856**	6.1	4.2	25.8
1969	Philadelphia	5	40.8	.321	.778	6.0	4.6	16.0
1970	Philadelphia	5	35.6	.446	.846	3.4	5.4	15.4
1971	Philadelphia	7	37.9	.438	.750	3.6	4.7	17.9
Career		92	39.6	.425	.812	5.5	4.3	20.4

== See also ==
- List of NBA career scoring leaders
- List of NBA franchise career scoring leaders
- List of NBA career personal fouls leaders
- List of NBA career minutes played leaders
- List of NBA players who have spent their entire career with one franchise
