= 1967 NBA playoffs =

Postseason tournament

Tournament details
- Dates: March 21–April 24, 1967
- Season: 1966–67
- Teams: 8

Final positions
- Champions: Philadelphia 76ers (2nd title)
- Runner-up: San Francisco Warriors
- Semifinalists: St. Louis Hawks; Boston Celtics

The 1967 NBA playoffs was the postseason tournament of the National Basketball Association's 1966-67 season. The tournament concluded with the Eastern Division champion Philadelphia 76ers defeating the Western Division champion San Francisco Warriors 4 games to 2 in the NBA Finals.

It was the 76ers' second NBA title in franchise history; their first had come in 1955 as the Syracuse Nationals.

The Boston Celtics were denied the chance to win their ninth straight championship, though they would win the title the following two seasons.

The expansion Chicago Bulls made the playoffs in their debut season, and the New York Knicks returned to the postseason for the first time since 1959. It is the longest gap in Knicks franchise history, a record they matched when they missed the playoffs starting in 2004 and ending in 2011.

The 1967 NBA playoffs marked a change in the league's playoff format; every tournament since 1955 had given the top-ranked team in each division a first-round bye, but starting this season, the NBA upped the number of playoff teams to eight, thereby eliminating a first-round bye for the regular-season division champions.

== Bracket ==
Division Semifinals
E1	Philadelphia*	3
E3	Cincinnati	1
Eastern Division
E4	New York	1
E2	Boston	3
W1	San Francisco*	3
W3	Los Angeles	0
Western Division
W4	Chicago	0
W2	St. Louis	3

Division Finals
E1	Philadelphia*	4
E2	Boston	1
W1	San Francisco*	4
W2	St. Louis	2

NBA Finals
E1	Philadelphia*	4
W1	San Francisco*	2

- * Division winner
- Bold Series winner
- Italic Team with home-court advantage in NBA Finals

== Division Semifinals ==
=== Eastern Division Semifinals ===
==== (1) Philadelphia 76ers vs. (3) Cincinnati Royals ====
March 21

Boxscore

Cincinnati Royals 120, Philadelphia 76ers 116
Scoring by quarter: 33–31, 30–26, 33–28, 24–31
Pts: Oscar Robertson 33; Rebs: Dierking, Lucas 18 each Asts: Oscar Robertson 16	Pts: Wilt Chamberlain 41; Rebs: Wilt Chamberlain 22; Asts: Chamberlain, Greer 5 each
Cincinnati leads series, 1–0

Philadelphia Convention Hall, Philadelphia, Pennsylvania
Attendance: 5,097

March 22

Boxscore

Philadelphia 76ers 123, Cincinnati Royals 102
Scoring by quarter: 35–22, 23–27, 33–26, 32–27
Pts: Wilt Chamberlain 37; Rebs: Wilt Chamberlain 27; Asts: Wilt Chamberlain 11	Pts: Oscar Robertson 29; Rebs: Connie Dierking 17; Asts: Oscar Robertson 9
Series tied, 1–1

Cincinnati Gardens, Cincinnati, Ohio
Attendance: 5,276

March 24

Boxscore

Cincinnati Royals 106, Philadelphia 76ers 121
Scoring by quarter: 26–39, 23–25, 22–23, 35–34
Pts: Oscar Robertson 25; Rebs: Jerry Lucas 23; Asts: Oscar Robertson 13	Pts: Hal Greer 33; Rebs: Wilt Chamberlain 30; Asts: Wilt Chamberlain 19
Philadelphia leads series, 2–1

Philadelphia Convention Hall, Philadelphia, Pennsylvania
Attendance: 8,987

March 25

Boxscore

Philadelphia 76ers 112, Cincinnati Royals 94
Scoring by quarter: 31–29, 34–27, 23–25, 24–13
Pts: Hal Greer 30; Rebs: Wilt Chamberlain 27; Asts: Wilt Chamberlain 9	Pts: Happy Hairston 26; Rebs: Jerry Lucas 25; Asts: Oscar Robertson 7
Philadelphia wins series, 3–1

Cincinnati Gardens, Cincinnati, Ohio
Attendance: 2,624

This was the fourth playoff meeting between these two teams, with the Royals winning two of the first three meetings.

Previous playoff series
Cincinnati leads 2–1 in all-time playoff series

1963

Syracuse Nationals 2, Cincinnati Royals 3

1963 Eastern Division Semifinals

1964

Philadelphia 76ers 2, Cincinnati Royals 3

1964 Eastern Division Semifinals

1965

Philadelphia 76ers 3, Cincinnati Royals 1

1965 Eastern Division Semifinals

==== (2) Boston Celtics vs. (4) New York Knicks ====
March 21

Boxscore

New York Knicks 110, Boston Celtics 140
Scoring by quarter: 28–34, 23–37, 30–32, 29–37
Pts: Willis Reed 23; Rebs: Walt Bellamy 10; Asts: Dick Van Arsdale 8	Pts: Sam Jones 38; Rebs: Bill Russell 23; Asts: Bill Russell 8
Boston leads series, 1–0

Boston Garden, Boston, Massachusetts
Attendance: 8,632

March 25

Boxscore

Boston Celtics 115, New York Knicks 108
Scoring by quarter: 15–25, 36–28, 37–28, 27–27
Pts: Sam Jones 26; Rebs: Bill Russell 18	Pts: Willis Reed 30; Rebs: Willis Reed 21
Boston leads series, 2–0

Madison Square Garden III, Manhattan, New York
Attendance: 10,009

March 26

Boxscore

New York Knicks 123, Boston Celtics 112
Scoring by quarter: 27–26, 34–25, 38–26, 24–35
Pts: Willis Reed 38; Rebs: Bellamy, Reed 16 each Asts: Howard Komives 5	Pts: John Havlicek 29; Rebs: Bill Russell 24; Asts: K. C. Jones 5
Boston leads series, 2–1

Boston Garden, Boston, Massachusetts
Attendance: 10,738

March 28

Boxscore

Boston Celtics 118, New York Knicks 109
Scoring by quarter: 31–22, 29–35, 30–22, 28–30
Pts: Sam Jones 51; Rebs: Bill Russell 16; Asts: K. C. Jones 7	Pts: Freddie Crawford 26; Rebs: Walt Bellamy 20; Asts: Freddie Crawford 6
Boston wins series, 3–1

Madison Square Garden III, Manhattan, New York
Attendance: 17,173

This was the sixth playoff meeting between these two teams, with the Knicks winning three of the first five meetings.

Previous playoff series
New York leads 3–2 in all-time playoff series

1951

Boston Celtics 0, New York Knicks 2

1951 Eastern Division Semifinals

1952

Boston Celtics 1, New York Knicks 2

1952 Eastern Division Semifinals

1953

Boston Celtics 1, New York Knicks 3

1953 Eastern Division Finals

1954

Boston Celtics 2, New York Knicks 0

1954 Eastern Division Round Robin Semifinals

1955

Boston Celtics 2, New York Knicks 1

1955 Eastern Division Semifinals

=== Western Division Semifinals ===
==== (1) San Francisco Warriors vs. (3) Los Angeles Lakers ====
March 21

Boxscore

Los Angeles Lakers 108, San Francisco Warriors 124
Scoring by quarter: 25–33, 20–32, 22–29, 41–30
Pts: Archie Clark 26; Rebs: Elgin Baylor 12; Asts: Clark, Imhoff 4 each	Pts: Jim King 22; Rebs: Nate Thurmond 20; Asts: King, Barry 6 each
San Francisco leads series, 1–0

Oakland–Alameda County Coliseum Arena, Oakland, California
Attendance: 11,106

March 23

Boxscore

San Francisco Warriors 113, Los Angeles Lakers 102
Scoring by quarter: 22–24, 29–18, 33–28, 29–32
Pts: Rick Barry 26; Rebs: Nate Thurmond 24; Asts: Nate Thurmond 7	Pts: Archie Clark 24; Rebs: Darrall Imhoff 10; Asts: three players 5 each
San Francisco leads series, 2–0

Los Angeles Memorial Sports Arena, Los Angeles, California
Attendance: 11,335

March 26

Boxscore

Los Angeles Lakers 115, San Francisco Warriors 122
Scoring by quarter: 26–36, 24–26, 40–30, 25–30
Pts: Elgin Baylor 37; Rebs: Elgin Baylor 18; Asts: Walt Hazzard 8	Pts: Rick Barry 37; Rebs: Nate Thurmond 21; Asts: Rick Barry 7
San Francisco wins series, 3–0

Cow Palace, Daly City, California
Attendance: 5,845

This was the first playoff meeting between these two teams. This was also the first postseason matchup between two California-based professional sports teams among the four major North American sports leagues.

To date, this remains the Warriors’ only playoff victory over the Lakers.

==== (2) St. Louis Hawks vs. (4) Chicago Bulls ====
March 21

Boxscore

Chicago Bulls 100, St. Louis Hawks 114
Scoring by quarter: 21–27, 29–29, 28–31, 22–27
Pts: Kojis, Boozer 18 each Rebs: Bob Boozer 13; Asts: Rodgers, Clemens 2 each	Pts: Lou Hudson 26; Rebs: Bridges, Silas 14 each Asts: Lenny Wilkens 6
St. Louis leads series, 1–0

Kiel Auditorium, St. Louis, Missouri
Attendance: 4,704

March 23

Boxscore

St. Louis Hawks 113, Chicago Bulls 107
Scoring by quarter: 35–26, 25–27, 19–34, 34–20
Pts: Lou Hudson 29; Rebs: Bill Bridges 12; Asts: Richie Guerin 6	Pts: Bob Boozer 25; Rebs: Kojis, Boozer 11 each Asts: Guy Rodgers 11
St. Louis leads series, 2–0

Chicago Coliseum, Chicago, Illinois
Attendance: 3,739

March 25

Boxscore

Chicago Bulls 106, St. Louis Hawks 119
Scoring by quarter: 28–30, 32–35, 21–24, 25–30
Pts: McCoy McLemore 18; Rebs: Bob Boozer 11; Asts: Guy Rodgers 5	Pts: Lenny Wilkens 27; Rebs: Bill Bridges 28; Asts: Lenny Wilkens 8
St. Louis wins series, 3–0

Kiel Auditorium, St. Louis, Missouri
Attendance: 7,018

This was the first playoff meeting between these two teams.

== Division Finals ==
=== Eastern Division Finals ===
==== (1) Philadelphia 76ers vs. (2) Boston Celtics ====
March 31

Boxscore

Boston Celtics 113, Philadelphia 76ers 127
Scoring by quarter: 26–32, 23–34, 31–28, 33–33
Pts: Sam Jones 24; Rebs: Bill Russell 15; Asts: Sam Jones 12	Pts: Hal Greer 39; Rebs: Wilt Chamberlain 32; Asts: Wilt Chamberlain 13
Philadelphia leads series, 1–0

Philadelphia Convention Hall, Philadelphia, Pennsylvania
Attendance: 9,239

- Wilt Chamberlain's unofficial quadruple-double with 24 points, 32 rebounds, 13 assists and 12 unofficially counted blocks.

April 2

Boxscore

Philadelphia 76ers 107, Boston Celtics 102
Scoring by quarter: 21–21, 34–37, 29–17, 23–27
Pts: Chet Walker 23; Rebs: Wilt Chamberlain 29; Asts: Chamberlain, Greer 5 each	Pts: John Havlicek 26; Rebs: Bill Russell 24; Asts: K. C. Jones 7
Philadelphia leads series, 2–0

Boston Garden, Boston, Massachusetts
Attendance: 13,909

April 5

Boxscore

Boston Celtics 104, Philadelphia 76ers 115
Scoring by quarter: 26–24, 26–35, 29–25, 23–31
Pts: John Havlicek 33; Rebs: Bill Russell 29; Asts: Bill Russell 9	Pts: Hal Greer 30; Rebs: Wilt Chamberlain 41; Asts: Wilt Chamberlain 9
Philadelphia leads series, 3–0

Philadelphia Convention Hall, Philadelphia, Pennsylvania
Attendance: 13,007

- Wilt Chamberlain's 41 rebounds sets a playoff record for an individual rebounder in a game.

April 9

Boxscore

Philadelphia 76ers 117, Boston Celtics 121
Scoring by quarter: 32–34, 28–32, 28–25, 29–30
Pts: Luke Jackson 29; Rebs: Wilt Chamberlain 22; Asts: Wilt Chamberlain 10	Pts: Sam Jones 32; Rebs: Bill Russell 28; Asts: Larry Siegfried 11
Philadelphia leads series, 3–1

Boston Garden, Boston, Massachusetts
Attendance: 13,909

April 11

Boxscore

Boston Celtics 116, Philadelphia 76ers 140
Scoring by quarter: 37–26, 33–39, 24–35, 22–40
Pts: John Havlicek 38; Rebs: Bill Russell 21; Asts: Larry Siegfried 8	Pts: Hal Greer 32; Rebs: Wilt Chamberlain 36; Asts: Wilt Chamberlain 13
Philadelphia wins series, 4–1

Philadelphia Convention Hall, Philadelphia, Pennsylvania
Attendance: 13,007

- K.C. Jones's final NBA game.
- Sixers snap Boston's NBA record playoff series winning streak at 18, and their championship reign at eight years.

This was the 11th playoff meeting between these two teams, with the Celtics winning six of the first 10 meetings.

Previous playoff series
Boston leads 6–4 in all-time playoff series

1953

Boston Celtics 2, Syracuse Nationals 0

1953 Eastern Division Semifinals

1954

Boston Celtics 0, Syracuse Nationals 2

1954 Eastern Division Round Robin Semifinals

1954

Boston Celtics 0, Syracuse Nationals 2

1954 Eastern Division Finals

1955

Boston Celtics 1, Syracuse Nationals 3

1955 Eastern Division Finals

1956

Boston Celtics 1, Syracuse Nationals 2

1956 Eastern Division Semifinals

1957

Boston Celtics 3, Syracuse Nationals 0

1957 Eastern Division Finals

1959

Boston Celtics 4, Syracuse Nationals 3

1959 Eastern Division Finals

1961

Boston Celtics 4, Syracuse Nationals 1

1961 Eastern Division Finals

1965

Boston Celtics 4, Philadelphia 76ers 3

1965 Eastern Division Finals

1966

Boston Celtics 4, Philadelphia 76ers 1

1966 Eastern Division Finals

=== Western Division Finals ===
==== (1) San Francisco Warriors vs. (2) St. Louis Hawks ====
March 30

Boxscore

St. Louis Hawks 115, San Francisco Warriors 117
Scoring by quarter: 25–40, 30–27, 28–32, 32–18
Pts: Lou Hudson 36; Rebs: Bill Bridges 21; Asts: Lenny Wilkens 6	Pts: Rick Barry 38; Rebs: Nate Thurmond 14; Asts: Jeff Mullins 7
San Francisco leads series, 1–0

Cow Palace, Daly City, California
Attendance: 7,813

April 1

Boxscore

St. Louis Hawks 136, San Francisco Warriors 143
Scoring by quarter: 32–38, 33–27, 38–44, 33–34
Pts: Bill Bridges 26	Pts: Rick Barry 47
San Francisco leads series, 2–0

Cow Palace, Daly City, California
Attendance: 12,337

April 5

Boxscore

San Francisco Warriors 109, St. Louis Hawks 115
Scoring by quarter: 27–23, 31–30, 28–42, 23–20
Pts: Rick Barry 31; Rebs: Nate Thurmond 21; Asts: Jeff Mullins 6	Pts: Bill Bridges 25; Rebs: Bill Bridges 32; Asts: Lenny Wilkens 7
San Francisco leads series, 2–1

Kiel Auditorium, St. Louis, Missouri
Attendance: 8,042

April 8

Boxscore

San Francisco Warriors 104, St. Louis Hawks 109
Scoring by quarter: 29–30, 33–28, 21–27, 21–24
Pts: Jeff Mullins 40; Rebs: Nate Thurmond 21; Asts: Jeff Mullins 4	Pts: Joe Caldwell 24; Rebs: Bill Bridges 17; Asts: Lenny Wilkens 11
Series tied, 2–2

Kiel Auditorium, St. Louis, Missouri
Attendance: 10,016

April 10

Boxscore

St. Louis Hawks 102, San Francisco Warriors 123
Scoring by quarter: 22–32, 23–30, 30–27, 27–34
Pts: Richie Guerin 19; Rebs: Bill Bridges 17; Asts: Lenny Wilkens 7	Pts: Rick Barry 25; Rebs: Nate Thurmond 27; Asts: Fred Hetzel 6
San Francisco leads series, 3–2

Cow Palace, Daly City, California
Attendance: 10,311

April 12

Boxscore

San Francisco Warriors 112, St. Louis Hawks 107
Scoring by quarter: 21–39, 30–21, 34–20, 27–27
Pts: Rick Barry 41; Rebs: Nate Thurmond 21; Asts: Rick Barry 5	Pts: Zelmo Beaty 28; Rebs: Zelmo Beaty 16; Asts: Lenny Wilkens 6
San Francisco wins series, 4–2

Kiel Auditorium, St. Louis, Missouri
Attendance: 8,004

This was the second playoff meeting between these two teams, with the Warriors winning the first meeting.

Previous playoff series
San Francisco leads 1–0 in all-time playoff series

1964

St. Louis Hawks 3, San Francisco Warriors 4

1964 Western Division Finals

== NBA Finals: (E1) Philadelphia 76ers vs. (W1) San Francisco Warriors ==
April 14

Boxscore

San Francisco Warriors 135, Philadelphia 76ers 141 (OT)
Scoring by quarter: 30–43, 35–30, 28–34, 35–21, Overtime: 7–13
Pts: Rick Barry 37; Rebs: Nate Thurmond 31; Asts: Rick Barry 7	Pts: Hal Greer 32; Rebs: Wilt Chamberlain 33; Asts: Wilt Chamberlain 10
Philadelphia leads series, 1–0

Philadelphia Convention Hall, Philadelphia, Pennsylvania
Attendance: 9,283

April 16

Boxscore

San Francisco Warriors 95, Philadelphia 76ers 126
Scoring by quarter: 17–26, 29–31, 23–28, 26–41
Pts: Rick Barry 30; Rebs: Nate Thurmond 29; Asts: Jim King 6	Pts: Hal Greer 30; Rebs: Wilt Chamberlain 38; Asts: Wilt Chamberlain 10
Philadelphia leads series, 2–0

Philadelphia Convention Hall, Philadelphia, Pennsylvania
Attendance: 9,426

April 18

Boxscore

Philadelphia 76ers 124, San Francisco Warriors 130
Scoring by quarter: 35–32, 28–37, 29–29, 32–32
Pts: Wilt Chamberlain 26; Rebs: Wilt Chamberlain 26; Asts: Wali Jones 7	Pts: Rick Barry 55; Rebs: Nate Thurmond 25; Asts: Jim King 6
Philadelphia leads series, 2–1

Cow Palace, Daly City, California
Attendance: 14,773

April 20

Boxscore

Philadelphia 76ers 122, San Francisco Warriors 108
Scoring by quarter: 34–27, 26–22, 31–29, 31–30
Pts: Hal Greer 38; Rebs: Wilt Chamberlain 27; Asts: Wilt Chamberlain 8	Pts: Rick Barry 43; Rebs: Nate Thurmond 25; Asts: Nate Thurmond 5
Philadelphia leads series, 3–1

Cow Palace, Daly City, California
Attendance: 15,117

April 23

Boxscore

San Francisco Warriors 117, Philadelphia 76ers 109
Scoring by quarter: 31–32, 30–32, 23–32, 33–13
Pts: Rick Barry 36; Rebs: Nate Thurmond 28; Asts: Al Attles 6	Pts: Chet Walker 25; Rebs: Wilt Chamberlain 24; Asts: Hal Greer 7
Philadelphia leads series, 3–2

Philadelphia Convention Hall, Philadelphia, Pennsylvania
Attendance: 10,229

April 24

Boxscore

Philadelphia 76ers 125, San Francisco Warriors 122
Scoring by quarter: 43–41, 25–31, 28–30, 29–20
Pts: Wali Jones 27; Rebs: Wilt Chamberlain 23; Asts: Hal Greer 7	Pts: Rick Barry 44; Rebs: Nate Thurmond 22; Asts: Jim King 7
Philadelphia wins series, 4–2

Cow Palace, Daly City, California
Attendance: 15,612

This was the 10th playoff meeting between these two teams, with the 76ers/Nationals winning five of the first nine meetings while based in Syracuse and the Warriors were the original NBA franchise based in Philadelphia.

Previous playoff series
Philadelphia 76ers/ Syracuse Nationals leads 5–4 in all-time playoff series

1950

Philadelphia Warriors 0, Syracuse Nationals 2

1950 Eastern Division Semifinals

1951

Philadelphia Warriors 0, Syracuse Nationals 2

1951 Eastern Division Semifinals

1952

Philadelphia Warriors 1, Syracuse Nationals 2

1952 Eastern Division Semifinals

1956

Philadelphia Warriors 3, Syracuse Nationals 2

1956 Eastern Division Finals

1957

Philadelphia Warriors 0, Syracuse Nationals 2

1957 Eastern Division Semifinals

1958

Philadelphia Warriors 2, Syracuse Nationals 1

1958 Eastern Division Semifinals

1960

Philadelphia Warriors 2, Syracuse Nationals 1

1960 Eastern Division Semifinals

1961

Philadelphia Warriors 0, Syracuse Nationals 3

1961 Eastern Division Semifinals

1962

Philadelphia Warriors 3, Syracuse Nationals 2

1962 Eastern Division Semifinals

== See also ==
- 1967 NBA Finals
- 1966-67 NBA season
