= 1966–67 Philadelphia 76ers season =

Second NBA championship season, first in Philadelphia

- NBA champions
- Division champions
- Head coach: Alex Hannum
- General manager: Jack Ramsay
- Owner: Irv Kosloff
- Arena: Philadelphia Arena and Civic Center-Convention Hall

Results
- Record: 68–13 (.840)
- Place: Division: 1st (Eastern)
- Playoff finish: NBA champions (Defeated Warriors 4–2)
- Stats at Basketball Reference

Local media
- Television: WFIL-TV
- Radio: WCAU

The 1966–67 season of the Philadelphia 76ers was their 14th season in the National Basketball Association (NBA) and their 4th since moving from Syracuse (as well as their final season at the Philadelphia Civic Center, before moving to the Spectrum in South Philadelphia the next season).

This season set a record in winning percentage (which had originally been set by the 1946–47 Washington Capitols in the NBA's official first season of play when the NBA was originally named the Basketball Association of America (BAA)) and they won the NBA Finals for the franchise's second championship and first in Philadelphia. This team was later chosen as the greatest individual team in 1980 for the NBA 35th Anniversary Team.

During the off-season, the 76ers dismissed head coach & former 76ers (Syracuse Nationals) player Dolph Schayes. Alex Hannum, (a former 1950s power forward, who was the last man to coach a winner past the Boston Celtics) was the new coach. The 43-year-old Hannum looked like he could still play, and often ran with the club in practice.

Wilt Chamberlain's 8 assists per game set a record for centers and made him 3rd in the NBA overall while scoring 24 points per game and once again leading the NBA in rebounds. Shooting less, he made a league-record 68% of his shots; his 875 free throw attempts, another league record, offset his terrible percentage from the foul line.

The 76ers also had three other players around the 20-point-per-game mark that season in Hal Greer with 22 points & Chet Walker & Billy Cunningham with 19 points each. The four players combined (as well as the rest of the roster) won a then-league-record 68 games together under Hannum's watch. The team averaged a record 125 points per game, leading all teams in shooting accuracy.

The 76ers started the season at 46–4, which remains the best 50-game start in the NBA history (though tied in the Warriors 2015-16 season). They finished the season at 68–13, the best record in league history at the time. In the 1st round of the playoffs, they swept the Cincinnati Royals, then in the Eastern Conference Finals, defeated the Boston Celtics (a team that had won eight consecutive titles and 9 out of the previous 10) 4 games to 1. In the Finals, they defeated the San Francisco Warriors, 4 games to 2.

In 1996, the 1966–67 76ers were named as one of the Top 10 Teams in NBA History. They averaged over 125 points per game in 81 regular season contests, still the third highest scoring team in league history for the regular season, and first among NBA Champions. Despite that, HoopsHype listed this 76ers squad as a team with the 23rd easiest NBA Finals championship route in 2024 due to the records of the first round opponent in the Cincinnati Royals and championship round opponent in the San Francisco Warriors respectively, with their Eastern Conference Finals opponent in the Boston Celtics saving this squad from an even easier route by comparison.

== Offseason ==
=== NBA draft ===
Round	Pick	Player	Position	Nationality	College
1	9	Matt Guokas	(G/F)	United States	St. Joseph's

== Roster ==
1966–67 Philadelphia 76ers roster
Players

Pos.	No.	Player	Height	Weight	DOB	From
C	13	Wilt Chamberlain	7 ft 1 in (2.16 m)	275 lb (125 kg)	1936-08-21	Kansas
PG	21	Larry Costello	6 ft 1 in (1.85 m)	186 lb (84 kg)	1931-07-02	Niagara
F	32	Billy Cunningham	6 ft 6 in (1.98 m)	210 lb (95 kg)	1943-06-03	North Carolina
F	20	Dave Gambee	6 ft 6 in (1.98 m)	215 lb (98 kg)	1937-04-16	Oregon State
G	15	Hal Greer	6 ft 2 in (1.88 m)	175 lb (79 kg)	1936-06-26	Marshall
SG	14	Matt Guokas	6 ft 5 in (1.96 m)	175 lb (79 kg)	1944-02-25	Saint Joseph's
F	54	Luke Jackson	6 ft 9 in (2.06 m)	240 lb (109 kg)	1941-10-31	Texas–Pan American
G	24	Wali Jones	6 ft 2 in (1.88 m)	180 lb (82 kg)	1942-02-14	Villanova
PG	28	Bill Melchionni	6 ft 1 in (1.85 m)	165 lb (75 kg)	1944-10-19	Villanova
F	25	Chet Walker	6 ft 6 in (1.98 m)	212 lb (96 kg)	1940-02-22	Bradley
G	12	Bob Weiss	6 ft 2 in (1.88 m)	180 lb (82 kg)	1942-05-07	Penn State

Coaches
Head coach
- Alex Hannum

Legend
- (DP) Unsigned draft pick
- (FA) Free agent
- (S) Suspended
- Injured

Roster

== Regular season ==
=== Season standings ===
Eastern Division	W	L	PCT	GB	Home	Road	Neutral	Div
x-Philadelphia 76ers	68	13	.840	–	28–2	26–8	14–3	28–8
x-Boston Celtics	60	21	.741	8	27–4	25–11	8–6	30–6
x-Cincinnati Royals	39	42	.481	29	20–11	12–24	7–7	14–22
x-New York Knicks	36	45	.444	32	20–15	9–24	7–6	11–25
Baltimore Bullets	20	61	.247	48	12–20	3–30	5–11	7–29

=== Game log ===
1966–67 Game log
October: 5–0 (Home: 4–0; Road: 1–0)

Game	Date	Opponent	Score	Record	Streak
1	October 15	New York Knicks	128–112	1–0	Won 1
2	October 21	St. Louis Hawks	119–110	2–0	Won 2
3	October 22	@ Baltimore Bullets	141–112	3–0	Won 3
4	October 25	Baltimore Bullets	130–110	4–0	Won 4
5	October 29	Boston Celtics	138–96	5–0	Won 5

November: 15–2 (Home: 7–0; Road: 5–2; Neutral: 3–0)

Game	Date	Opponent	Score	Record	Streak
6	November 3	vs St. Louis Hawks	120–108	6–0	Won 6
7	November 4	San Francisco Warriors	134–129	7–0	Won 7
8	November 5	@ Boston Celtics	87–105	7–1	Lost 1
9	November 8	vs Detroit Pistons	118–100	8–1	Won 1
10	November 11	Chicago Bulls	126–113	9–1	Won 2
11	November 12	@ Cincinnati Royals	112–98	10–1	Won 3
12	November 13	@ Chicago Bulls	132–126	11–1	Won 4
13	November 15	@ New York Knicks	113–109	12–1	Won 5
14	November 16	New York Knicks	117–108	13–1	Won 6
15	November 18	vs Chicago Bulls	145–120	14–1	Won 7
16	November 19	Cincinnati Royals	134–110	15–1	Won 8
17	November 23	@ Cincinnati Royals	106–111	15–2	Lost 1
18	November 24	San Francisco Warriors	140–123	16–2	Won 1
19	November 25	@ Baltimore Bullets	129–115	17–2	Won 2
20	November 26	Detroit Pistons	131–123	18–2	Won 3
21	November 29	St. Louis Hawks	137–116	19–2	Won 4
22	November 30	@ Detroit Pistons	128–119	20–2	Won 5

December: 15–1 (Home: 6–0; Road: 7–1; Neutral: 2–0)

Game	Date	Opponent	Score	Record	Streak
23	December 2	Los Angeles Lakers	138–130	21–2	Won 6
24	December 3	@ Baltimore Bullets	137–120	22–2	Won 7
25	December 6	Chicago Bulls	129–119	23–2	Won 8
26	December 7	@ Chicago Bulls	117–103	24–2	Won 9
27	December 9	New York Knicks	112–107	25–2	Won 10
28	December 10	@ St. Louis Hawks	133–123	26–2	Won 11
29	December 11	@ Boston Celtics	103–117	26–3	Lost 1
30	December 13	@ New York Knicks	127–112	27–3	Won 1
31	December 16	St. Louis Hawks	124–113	28–3	Won 2
32	December 17	vs Detroit Pistons	120–105	29–3	Won 3
33	December 21	@ Los Angeles Lakers	129–123	30–3	Won 4
34	December 22	@ San Francisco Warriors	116–114	31–3	Won 5
35	December 23	@ Los Angeles Lakers	118–107	32–3	Won 6
36	December 26	Cincinnati Royals	134–118	33–3	Won 7
37	December 28	Boston Celtics	113–108	34–3	Won 8
38	December 30	vs Detroit Pistons	137–113	35–3	Won 9

January: 12–3 (Home: 6–1; Road: 4–1; Neutral: 2–1)

Game	Date	Opponent	Score	Record	Streak
39	January 3	@ New York Knicks	148–142 (OT)	36–3	Won 10
40	January 4	Chicago Bulls	136–115	37–3	Won 11
41	January 5	vs New York Knicks	104–112	37–4	Lost 1
42	January 6	Baltimore Bullets	121–115 (OT)	38–4	Won 1
43	January 8	@ Chicago Bulls	117–108	39–4	Won 2
44	January 13	St. Louis Hawks	125–107	40–4	Won 3
45	January 15	@ Boston Celtics	110–95	41–4	Won 4
46	January 17	New York Knicks	119–111	42–4	Won 5
47	January 18	@ Detroit Pistons	113–105	43–4	Won 6
48	January 19	vs Chicago Bulls	127–102	44–4	Won 7
49	January 20	Los Angeles Lakers	119–108	45–4	Won 8
50	January 23	vs St. Louis Hawks	112–105	46–4	Won 9
51	January 24	Boston Celtics	106–118	46–5	Lost 1
52	January 27	Cincinnati Royals	110–107	47–5	Won 1
53	January 29	@ St. Louis Hawks	108–114	47–6	Lost 1

February: 11–4 (Home: 2–0; Road: 4–3; Neutral: 5–1)

Game	Date	Opponent	Score	Record	Streak
54	February 1	@ Los Angeles Lakers	133–143	47–7	Lost 2
55	February 2	vs San Francisco Warriors	120–137	47–8	Lost 3
56	February 4	vs San Francisco Warriors	140–127	48–8	Won 1
57	February 5	@ Los Angeles Lakers	130–123	49–8	Won 2
58	February 7	vs San Francisco Warriors	126–123	50–8	Won 3
59	February 8	@ Cincinnati Royals	118–106	51–8	Won 4
60	February 10	Los Angeles Lakers	148–131	52–8	Won 5
61	February 11	@ Baltimore Bullets	133–139	52–9	Lost 1
62	February 12	@ Boston Celtics	112–113	52–10	Lost 2
63	February 13	Cincinnati Royals	131–123	53–10	Won 1
64	February 15	@ Detroit Pistons	127–121	54–10	Won 2
65	February 17	vs Cincinnati Royals	127–118	55–10	Won 3
66	February 19	@ St. Louis Hawks	123–122	56–10	Won 4
67	February 24	vs Baltimore Bullets	149–118	57–10	Won 5
68	February 28	vs Cincinnati Royals	127–107	58–10	Won 6

March: 10–3 (Home: 3–1; Road: 5–1; Neutral: 2–1)

Game	Date	Opponent	Score	Record	Streak
69	March 1	vs Chicago Bulls	122–129	58–11	Lost 1
70	March 2	San Francisco Warriors	136–128	59–11	Won 1
71	March 3	vs Detroit Pistons	129–103	60–11	Won 2
72	March 5	Detroit Pistons	131–106	61–11	Won 3
73	March 6	vs Los Angeles Lakers	119–117	62–11	Won 4
74	March 8	@ Boston Celtics	115–113 (OT)	63–11	Won 5
75	March 11	Boston Celtics	114–116	63–12	Lost 1
76	March 12	@ New York Knicks	131–120	64–12	Won 1
77	March 14	@ San Francisco Warriors	139–110	65–12	Won 2
78	March 15	@ Los Angeles Lakers	138–123	66–12	Won 3
79	March 16	@ San Francisco Warriors	131–145	66–13	Lost 1
80	March 18	Baltimore Bullets	135–119	67–13	Won 1
81	March 19	@ Baltimore Bullets	132–129	68–13	Won 2

Season schedule

== Player stats ==
Note: GP= Games played; PTS= Points; REB= Rebounds; AST= Assists; BLK= Blocks; STL= Steals;

Player	GP	PTS	REB	AST	BLK	STL

== Playoffs ==
1967 playoff game log
Division Semifinals: 3–1 (home: 1–1; road: 2–0)

Game	Date	Team	Score	High points	High rebounds	High assists	Location Attendance	Series
1	March 21	Cincinnati	L 116–120	Wilt Chamberlain (41)	Wilt Chamberlain (22)	Chamberlain, Greer (5)	Philadelphia Convention Hall; 5,097	0–1
2	March 22	@ Cincinnati	W 123–102	Wilt Chamberlain (37)	Wilt Chamberlain (27)	Wilt Chamberlain (11)	Cincinnati Gardens; 5,276	1–1
3	March 24	Cincinnati	W 121–106	Hal Greer (33)	Wilt Chamberlain (30)	Wilt Chamberlain (19)	Philadelphia Convention Hall; 8,987	2–1
4	March 25	@ Cincinnati	W 112–94	Hal Greer (30)	Wilt Chamberlain (27)	Wilt Chamberlain (9)	Cincinnati Gardens; 2,624	3–1

Division Finals: 4–1 (home: 3–0; road: 1–1)

Game	Date	Team	Score	High points	High rebounds	High assists	Location Attendance	Series
1	March 31	Boston	W 127–113	Hal Greer (39)	Wilt Chamberlain (32)	Wilt Chamberlain (13)	Palestra; 9,239	1–0
2	April 2	@ Boston	W 107–102	Chet Walker (23)	Wilt Chamberlain (29)	Chamberlain, Greer (5)	Boston Garden; 13,909	2–0
3	April 5	Boston	W 115–104	Hal Greer (30)	Wilt Chamberlain (41)	Wilt Chamberlain (9)	Philadelphia Convention Hall; 13,007	3–0
4	April 9	@ Boston	L 117–121	Luke Jackson (29)	Wilt Chamberlain (22)	Wilt Chamberlain (10)	Boston Garden; 13,909	3–1
5	April 11	Boston	W 140–116	Hal Greer (32)	Wilt Chamberlain (36)	Wilt Chamberlain (13)	Philadelphia Convention Hall; 13,007	4–1

NBA Finals: 4–2 (home: 2–1; road: 2–1)

Game	Date	Team	Score	High points	High rebounds	High assists	Location Attendance	Series
1	April 14	San Francisco	W 141–135 (OT)	Hal Greer (32)	Wilt Chamberlain (33)	Wilt Chamberlain (10)	Philadelphia Convention Hall; 9,283	1–0
2	April 16	San Francisco	W 126–95	Hal Greer (30)	Wilt Chamberlain (38)	Wilt Chamberlain (10)	Philadelphia Convention Hall; 9,426	2–0
3	April 18	@ San Francisco	L 124–130	Wilt Chamberlain (26)	Wilt Chamberlain (26)	Wali Jones (7)	Cow Palace; 14,773	2–1
4	April 20	@ San Francisco	W 122–108	Hal Greer (38)	Wilt Chamberlain (27)	Wilt Chamberlain (8)	Cow Palace; 15,117	3–1
5	April 23	San Francisco	L 109–117	Chet Walker (25)	Wilt Chamberlain (24)	Hal Greer (7)	Philadelphia Convention Hall; 10,229	3–2
6	April 24	@ San Francisco	W 125–122	Wali Jones (27)	Wilt Chamberlain (23)	Hal Greer (7)	Cow Palace; 15,612	4–2

1967 schedule

== Awards and records ==
- Wilt Chamberlain, NBA Most Valuable Player Award
- Wilt Chamberlain, All-NBA First Team
- Hal Greer, All-NBA Second Team
