= 1966–67 Boston Celtics season =

Celtics' 21st season in the NBA

- Head coach: Bill Russell
- General manager: Red Auerbach
- Arena: Boston Garden

Results
- Record: 60–21 (.741)
- Place: Division: 2nd (Eastern)
- Playoff finish: East Division finals (lost to 76ers 1–4)
- Stats at Basketball Reference

Local media
- Television: WKBG-TV
- Radio: WHDH

The 1966–67 Boston Celtics season was the Boston Celtics' 21st season in the NBA. The Celtics finished the season with a 60–21 record, the second best in the league. However, they lost to the Philadelphia 76ers in the Eastern Conference finals 4 games to 1, thus ending their 8-year streak.

This marked the first of three seasons Bill Russell coached the club—while still a player—stepping in for Red Auerbach who would focus on his expanded role as general manager (he was already the de facto GM by that point).

== Draft picks ==
This table only displays picks through the second round.

Round	Pick	Player	Position	Nationality	College
1	8	Jim Barnett	SF/SG	United States	Oregon
2	18	Leon Clark	SF/PF	United States	Wyoming

== Roster ==
1966–67 Boston Celtics roster
Players

Pos.	No.	Player	Height	Weight	DOB	From
SG	11	Jim Barnett	6 ft 4 in (1.93 m)	170 lb (77 kg)	1944-07-07	Oregon
C	28	Wayne Embry	6 ft 8 in (2.03 m)	240 lb (109 kg)	1937-03-26	Miami (OH)
SF	17	John Havlicek	6 ft 5 in (1.96 m)	203 lb (92 kg)	1940-04-08	Ohio State
PF	18	Bailey Howell	6 ft 7 in (2.01 m)	210 lb (95 kg)	1937-01-20	Mississippi State
PG	25	K. C. Jones	6 ft 1 in (1.85 m)	200 lb (91 kg)	1932-05-25	San Francisco
SG	24	Sam Jones	6 ft 4 in (1.93 m)	198 lb (90 kg)	1933-06-24	North Carolina Central
PF	26	Toby Kimball	6 ft 6 in (1.98 m)	220 lb (100 kg)	1942-09-07	Connecticut
SF	19	Don Nelson	6 ft 6 in (1.98 m)	210 lb (95 kg)	1940-05-15	Iowa
C	6	Bill Russell	6 ft 10 in (2.08 m)	215 lb (98 kg)	1934-02-12	San Francisco
SF	16	Satch Sanders	6 ft 6 in (1.98 m)	210 lb (95 kg)	1938-11-08	NYU
PG	20	Larry Siegfried	6 ft 3 in (1.91 m)	190 lb (86 kg)	1939-05-22	Ohio State
F	12	Ron Watts	6 ft 6 in (1.98 m)	210 lb (95 kg)	1943-05-21	Wake Forest

Coaches
Head coach
- Bill Russell

Legend
- (DP) Unsigned draft pick
- (FA) Free agent
- (S) Suspended
- Injured

== Regular season ==
=== Season standings ===
Eastern Division	W	L	PCT	GB	Home	Road	Neutral	Div
x-Philadelphia 76ers	68	13	.840	–	28–2	26–8	14–3	28–8
x-Boston Celtics	60	21	.741	8	27–4	25–11	8–6	30–6
x-Cincinnati Royals	39	42	.481	29	20–11	12–24	7–7	14–22
x-New York Knicks	36	45	.444	32	20–15	9–24	7–6	11–25
Baltimore Bullets	20	61	.247	48	12–20	3–30	5–11	7–29

=== Game log ===
1966–67 game log
#	Date	Opponent	Score	High points	Record
1	October 15	San Francisco	113–121	Sam Jones (29)	1–0
2	October 21	Baltimore	91–111	John Havlicek (28)	2–0
3	October 22	@ New York	126–97	Sam Jones (27)	3–0
4	October 27	N Chicago	100–123	Bailey Howell (28)	4–0
5	October 29	@ Philadelphia	96–138	Larry Siegfried (24)	4–1
6	November 2	Los Angeles	108–133	John Havlicek (27)	5–1
7	November 3	N Chicago	108–137	Bailey Howell (21)	6–1
8	November 5	Philadelphia	87–105	Havlicek, S. Jones (29)	7–1
9	November 8	@ Chicago	112–101	Bailey Howell (25)	8–1
10	November 10	@ Cincinnati	113–112 (OT)	Bailey Howell (27)	9–1
11	November 11	New York	106–111	Bill Russell (21)	10–1
12	November 12	@ St. Louis	92–115	Havlicek, Howell (14)	10–2
13	November 18	Baltimore	119–143	Sam Jones (27)	11–2
14	November 19	@ Baltimore	147–125	John Havlicek (32)	12–2
15	November 23	St. Louis	103–123	John Havlicek (34)	13–2
16	November 24	@ St. Louis	101–78	Larry Siegfried (24)	14–2
17	November 25	@ Detroit	105–107	Bailey Howell (29)	14–3
18	November 26	Cincinnati	87–118	Don Nelson (24)	15–3
19	November 29	N Detroit	104–100	Bailey Howell (23)	15–4
20	December 2	Detroit	119–116	John Havlicek (32)	15–5
21	December 3	@ New York	120–109	Sam Jones (31)	16–5
22	December 6	N Detroit	111–130	Bailey Howell (26)	17–5
23	December 7	Cincinnati	91–119	John Havlicek (32)	18–5
24	December 9	@ Cincinnati	117–99	Sam Jones (31)	19–5
25	December 10	Chicago	110–125	Sam Jones (25)	20–5
26	December 11	Philadelphia	103–117	John Havlicek (34)	21–5
27	December 15	N St. Louis	116–114	Howell, Russell (22)	21–6
28	December 17	@ San Francisco	118–110	Havlicek, S. Jones (30)	22–6
29	December 18	@ Los Angeles	125–127	John Havlicek (27)	22–7
30	December 20	N Detroit	113–116 (OT)	John Havlicek (32)	23–7
31	December 23	St. Louis	103–114	Sam Jones (32)	24–7
32	December 26	Los Angeles	106–121	John Havlicek (25)	25–7
33	December 28	@ Philadelphia	108–113	Sam Jones (22)	25–8
34	December 29	@ St. Louis	112–110	John Havlicek (21)	26–8
35	December 30	@ Chicago	110–106	Sam Jones (33)	27–8
36	January 1	@ Los Angeles	110–111	Sam Jones (28)	27–9
37	January 3	@ San Francisco	126–121 (OT)	Sam Jones (31)	28–9
38	January 6	@ Los Angeles	99–102	Sam Jones (22)	28–10
39	January 7	@ San Francisco	108–110	Bailey Howell (24)	28–11
40	January 13	Chicago	102–122	Larry Siegfried (24)	29–11
41	January 14	@ Baltimore	115–106	Larry Siegfried (25)	30–11
42	January 15	Philadelphia	110–95	Havlicek, S. Jones (21)	30–12
43	January 17	@ Chicago	109–101	Bailey Howell (30)	31–12
44	January 18	@ Cincinnati	119–106	John Havlicek (20)	32–12
45	January 20	Baltimore	117–129	John Havlicek (33)	33–12
46	January 22	Los Angeles	120–121 (OT)	Sam Jones (31)	34–12
47	January 24	@ Philadelphia	118–106	Sam Jones (38)	35–12
48	January 25	@ Detroit	112–105	Sam Jones (30)	36–12
49	January 27	Detroit	106–112	Sam Jones (26)	37–12
50	January 28	@ New York	114–112	Bailey Howell (25)	38–12
51	January 29	New York	106–141	Bailey Howell (32)	39–12
52	January 30	N San Francisco	108–121	Sam Jones (32)	40–12
53	February 1	@ Baltimore	111–107	Sam Jones (29)	41–12
54	February 3	St. Louis	131–113	John Havlicek (27)	41–13
55	February 5	Cincinnati	121–137	Sam Jones (26)	42–13
56	February 7	N Cincinnati	123–138	Bailey Howell (28)	43–13
57	February 9	N Baltimore	124–128	Bailey Howell (26)	43–14
58	February 10	San Francisco	136–137 (2OT)	John Havlicek (28)	44–14
59	February 12	Philadelphia	112–113	John Havlicek (33)	45–14
60	February 14	N San Francisco	128–122	John Havlicek (32)	45–15
61	February 15	@ Los Angeles	114–124	John Havlicek (24)	45–16
62	February 17	@ Los Angeles	120–119	Larry Siegfried (32)	46–16
63	February 18	N San Francisco	130–124	John Havlicek (29)	46–17
64	February 21	@ New York	143–114	Sam Jones (27)	47–17
65	February 22	@ Baltimore	135–120	Sam Jones (42)	48–17
66	February 23	New York	117–122	Howell, Siegfried (28)	49–17
67	February 26	@ St. Louis	130–119	Sam Jones (39)	50–17
68	March 1	San Francisco	125–137	John Havlicek (36)	51–17
69	March 2	N Chicago	108–114	Sam Jones (33)	52–17
70	March 3	Cincinnati	104–111	Larry Siegfried (29)	53–17
71	March 5	Los Angeles	105–130	Sam Jones (22)	54–17
72	March 6	N Detroit	103–127	Bailey Howell (38)	55–17
73	March 7	@ Chicago	114–117	Larry Siegfried (24)	55–18
74	March 8	Philadelphia	115–113 (OT)	Sam Jones (20)	55–19
75	March 11	@ Philadelphia	116–114	Sam Jones (26)	56–19
76	March 12	Baltimore	118–123	Bailey Howell (30)	57–19
77	March 13	N St. Louis	123–122	Bailey Howell (24)	57–20
78	March 15	@ Cincinnati	108–112	John Havlicek (30)	57–21
79	March 16	@ Detroit	132–109	Bailey Howell (37)	58–21
80	March 18	@ New York	140–123	Bailey Howell (34)	59–21
81	March 19	New York	113–124	Sam Jones (29)	60–21

== Playoffs ==
1967 playoff game log
Division semifinals: 3–1 (home: 1–1; road: 2–0)

Game	Date	Team	Score	High points	High rebounds	High assists	Location Attendance	Series
1	March 21	New York	W 140–110	Sam Jones (38)	Bill Russell (23)	Bill Russell (8)	Boston Garden; 8,632	1–0
2	March 25	@ New York	W 115–108	Sam Jones (26)	Bill Russell (18)	Larry Siegfried (8)	Madison Square Garden III; 10,009	2–0
3	March 26	New York	L 112–123	John Havlicek (29)	Bill Russell (24)	K. C. Jones (5)	Boston Garden; 10,738	2–1
4	March 28	@ New York	W 118–109	Sam Jones (51)	Bill Russell (16)	K. C. Jones (7)	Madison Square Garden III; 17,173	3–1

Division finals: 1–4 (home: 1–1; road: 0–3)

Game	Date	Team	Score	High points	High rebounds	High assists	Location Attendance	Series
1	March 31	@ Philadelphia	L 113–127	Sam Jones (24)	Bill Russell (15)	Sam Jones (12)	Philadelphia Convention Hall; 9,239	0–1
2	April 2	Philadelphia	L 102–107	John Havlicek (26)	Bill Russell (24)	K. C. Jones (7)	Boston Garden; 13,909	0–2
3	April 5	@ Philadelphia	L 104–115	John Havlicek (33)	Bill Russell (29)	Bill Russell (9)	Philadelphia Convention Hall; 13,007	0–3
4	April 9	Philadelphia	W 121–117	Sam Jones (32)	Bill Russell (28)	Larry Siegfried (11)	Boston Garden; 13,909	1–3
5	April 11	@ Philadelphia	L 116–140	John Havlicek (38)	Bill Russell (21)	Larry Siegfried (8)	Philadelphia Convention Hall; 13,007	1–4

1967 schedule

== Awards and records ==
- Bill Russell, All-NBA Second Team
- Sam Jones, All-NBA Second Team
