= 1966–67 NBA season =

21st NBA season

- League: National Basketball Association
- Sport: Basketball
- Duration: October 15, 1966 – March 19, 1967; March 21 – April 12, 1967 (Playoffs); April 14–24, 1967 (Finals)
- Games: 81
- Teams: 10
- TV partner: ABC

Draft
- Top draft pick: Cazzie Russell
- Picked by: New York Knicks

Regular season
- Top seed: Philadelphia 76ers
- Season MVP: Wilt Chamberlain (Philadelphia)
- Top scorer: Rick Barry (San Francisco)

Playoffs
- Eastern champions: Philadelphia 76ers
- Eastern runners-up: Boston Celtics
- Western champions: San Francisco Warriors
- Western runners-up: St. Louis Hawks

Finals
- Champions: Philadelphia 76ers
- Runners-up: San Francisco Warriors

NBA seasons
- ← 1965–66 1967–68 →

The 1966–67 NBA season was the 21st season of the National Basketball Association and one of its most successful to date. It culminated with the Philadelphia 76ers winning the league championship, beating the San Francisco Warriors 4 games to 2 in the NBA Finals. The Boston Celtics saw their record of eight consecutive titles come to an end.

== Notable occurrences ==
- After a three-year hiatus, professional basketball returns to Chicago in the form of the expansion Bulls, who become the first expansion club to earn a playoff berth in major pro sports history.
- The Baltimore Bullets move from the West to East Division.
- The NBA expands its regular season from 80 to 81 games per team.
- The NBA increases its post-season field from six to eight qualifiers, four in each division.
- The 1967 NBA All-Star Game is played at the Cow Palace in Daly City, California, where the West squad upsets the heavily favored East, 135–120. San Francisco Warriors sophomore sensation Rick Barry is voted the Most Valuable Player on the strength of a record 35-point performance.
- Only three of the 10 teams win as many as half their games in the regular season: Celtics, 76ers and Warriors.

Coaching changes
Offseason
Team	1965–66 coach	1966–67 coach
Baltimore Bullets	Paul Seymour	Mike Farmer
Boston Celtics	Red Auerbach	Bill Russell
Chicago Bulls	Expansion	Johnny "Red" Kerr
New York Knicks	Dick McGuire	Vince Boryla
Philadelphia 76ers	Dolph Schayes	Alex Hannum
San Francisco Warriors	Alex Hannum	Bill Sharman
In-season
Team	Outgoing coach	Incoming coach
Detroit Pistons	Dave DeBusschere	Donnie Butcher

== Season recap ==
=== Philadelphia 76ers ===
The Philadelphia 76ers had dismissed coach Dolph Schayes of Syracuse Nationals fame. Alex Hannum, the former 50s power forward who was the last man to coach a winner past Boston, was the new coach. The 43-year-old Hannum looked like he could still play, and often ran with the club in practice.

Hannum's 76ers would share the ball, or play 'Celtic-ball' as some observed. Wilt Chamberlain would not be expected to hold the team afloat like Atlas but would pass more and get the others involved. Chamberlain had bragged in interviews that he was the sport's best passer on top of his other abilities. His eight assists per game set a record for centers and made him third in the NBA overall, scoring 24 per game, while again leading the NBA in rebounds and blocked shots. Shooting less, he made a league-record 68% of his shots; his 875 free throw attempts, another league record, offset his dismal percentage from the foul line.

The 76ers also had three other players around the 20 point-per-game mark this year in Hal Greer with 22 points, Chet Walker and Billy Cunningham, both with 19 points. All four players combined won a league-record 68 games together under Hannum's watch. The team scored a record 125 points per game, leading all teams in shooting accuracy.

The 76ers started the season at 46–4, still the best 50 game start in league history (tied by the Golden State Warriors in the 2015–16 season). They finished the season at 68–13, the best record in league history at the time.

=== Celtics ===
The Boston Celtics won 60 games under player-coach Bill Russell, who made a relatively seamless transition to his new dual role. But their advanced age began to show in mid-December, when a four-week lull took them out of East contention. The deathblow came on Jan. 15 at Boston Garden, where a 110-95 loss to the 76ers vaulted their rivals to a 9 1/2-game lead in the division.

The 32-year-old Russell finished third in rebounds the league and first in assists on his team. As usual, he had ample support. Three teammates averaged at least 20 points per game --- veteran Sam Jones (22.1), emerging John Havlicek (21.4) and newly acquired Bailey Howell (20.0). Two others placed in double figures. Longtime head coach Red Auerbach oversaw the operation in his full-time role of general manager.

=== San Francisco Warriors ===
On the heels of a Rookie of the Year season, 22-year-old Rick Barry continued his rise to move past the Los Angeles Lakers' Elgin Baylor and the Cincinnati Royals' Jerry Lucas as the most dominant forward in the game. Not only did Barry supplant Wilt Chamberlain as the top scorer in the league at 35.6 points per game, but he also had the second-highest number of free throw tries (852), of which he made a league-high 753 for an 88 percent success rate. He added 9.2 rebounds and 3.6 assists per game for good measure.

The other Warrior star emerging was center Nate Thurmond. A former protégé of Chamberlain, Thurmond ranked second in the NBA in rebounds while scoring 19 points per game. Five others averaged 10 points or more under first-year head coach Bill Sharman, whose up-tempo offense took the league by storm until myriad injuries slowed it down the stretch.

=== Playoffs ===
Chicago surpassed the Detroit Pistons for the last spot in the West, putting America's second-largest city in the playoffs, which continued to become a larger television event each year.

In the East, the two dominators both won their first round series with just one lost game each. Philadelphia beat Cincinnati and superstar Oscar Robertson three games to one. Boston beat an improving New York Knickerbockers club led by third-year star Willis Reed three to one also. The Boston–Philadelphia matchup was set again for the division final.

In the West, San Francisco and second-place St.Louis both advanced behind 3–0 sweeps. The Warriors routed the Lakers, minus superstar Jerry West, while the St.Louis Hawks ended the first season of Chicago's Bulls, led by coach Johnny Kerr, the former Syracuse Nationals star, and players Bob Boozer, Don Kojis and Guy Rodgers.

Rich Guerin's balanced Hawks, led by Lenny Wilkens, Lou Hudson and Bill Bridges, tried hard to slow Barry, Thurmond and Co., but the Warriors made their second NBA Finals in four seasons, four games to two.

Those expecting a close series in the East or another Philadelphia fold were stunned to see a five-game series completely dominated by the 76ers. Winning the first three in clear numbers, the Sixers brought Boston back to their home court so they could bash the Celtics 140-116 and send them home. Bill Russell's first season as coach was a disappointment only in comparison to Auerbach's towering achievements before him. Chamberlain turned down the victory champagne from that celebrated win, saying there was still one more series to win.

The Warriors were not all that cooperative, taking Game One to overtime and winning two games. Barry and Thurmond's performances were impressive. But Philadelphia's three 20-point scorers – Chamberlain, Walker and Greer – led their franchise to their first NBA title since the old Syracuse days in 1955, the first season of the 24-second clock.

Wilt averaged 22 points, 29 rebounds, nine assists and 58% shooting for his 15 playoff games. He also had many blocks and had 160 free throw tries to offset his misses there. Wilt, again, likely posted multiple quadruple-double games this year, including perhaps in the Finals. However, blocked shots were not then kept as a league statistic (and would not be until 1973), so it is impossible to determine.

== Final standings ==
=== Eastern Division ===
Eastern Division	W	L	PCT	GB	Home	Road	Neutral	Div
x-Philadelphia 76ers	68	13	.840	–	28–2	26–8	14–3	28–8
x-Boston Celtics	60	21	.741	8	27–4	25–11	8–6	30–6
x-Cincinnati Royals	39	42	.481	29	20–11	12–24	7–7	14–22
x-New York Knicks	36	45	.444	32	20–15	9–24	7–6	11–25
Baltimore Bullets	20	61	.247	48	12–20	3–30	5–11	7–29

=== Western Division ===
Western Division	W	L	PCT	GB	Home	Road	Neutral	Div
x-San Francisco Warriors	44	37	.543	–	18–10	11–19	15–8	24–12
x-St. Louis Hawks	39	42	.481	5	18–11	12–21	9–10	21–15
x-Los Angeles Lakers	36	45	.444	8	21–18	12–20	3–7	14–22
x-Chicago Bulls	33	48	.407	11	17–19	9–17	7–12	17–19
Detroit Pistons	30	51	.370	14	12–18	9–19	9–14	14–22

x – clinched playoff spot

== Playoff bracket ==
Division Semifinals
E1	Philadelphia*	3
E3	Cincinnati	1
Eastern Division
E4	New York	1
E2	Boston	3
W1	San Francisco*	3
W3	Los Angeles	0
Western Division
W4	Chicago	0
W2	St. Louis	3

Division Finals
E1	Philadelphia*	4
E2	Boston	1
W1	San Francisco*	4
W2	St. Louis	2

NBA Finals
E1	Philadelphia*	4
W1	San Francisco*	2

- * Division winner
- Bold Series winner
- Italic Team with home-court advantage in NBA Finals

== Statistics leaders ==
Category	Player	Team	Stat
Points	Rick Barry	San Francisco Warriors	2,775
Rebounds	Wilt Chamberlain	Philadelphia 76ers	1,957
Assists	Guy Rodgers	Chicago Bulls	908
FG%	Wilt Chamberlain	Philadelphia 76ers	.683
FT%	Adrian Smith	Cincinnati Royals	.903

Note: Prior to the 1969–70 season, league leaders in points, rebounds, and assists were determined by totals rather than averages.

== NBA awards ==
- Most Valuable Player: Wilt Chamberlain, Philadelphia 76ers
- Rookie of the Year: Dave Bing, Detroit Pistons
- Coach of the Year: Johnny Kerr, Chicago Bulls
- All-NBA First Team:
  - G – Oscar Robertson, Cincinnati Royals
  - G – Jerry West, Los Angeles Lakers
  - C – Wilt Chamberlain, Philadelphia 76ers
  - F – Elgin Baylor, Los Angeles Lakers
  - F – Rick Barry, San Francisco Warriors
- All-NBA Second Team:
  - G – Hal Greer, Philadelphia 76ers
  - G – Sam Jones, Boston Celtics
  - C – Bill Russell, Boston Celtics
  - F – Jerry Lucas, Cincinnati Royals
  - F – Willis Reed, New York Knicks
- NBA All-Rookie First Team:
  - Jack Marin, Baltimore Bullets
  - Dave Bing, Detroit Pistons
  - Erwin Mueller, Chicago Bulls
  - Lou Hudson, St. Louis Hawks
  - Cazzie Russell, New York Knicks

== See also ==
- 1967 NBA Finals
- List of NBA regular season records
