= List of 1969–70 NBA season transactions =

These are the list of personnel changes in the NBA from the 1969–70 NBA season.

== Events ==
=== July 11, 1969 ===
- Al Bianchi resigns as head coach for Seattle SuperSonics.

=== August 22, 1969 ===
- The San Diego Rockets traded Hank Finkel to the Boston Celtics for cash.

=== September 2, 1969 ===
- The Philadelphia 76ers traded Shaler Halimon and Chet Walker to the Chicago Bulls for Bob Kauffman and Jim Washington. Kaufmann was sent as the player to be named later on May 11, 1970.

=== September 5, 1969 ===
- The Chicago Bulls traded Bob Boozer and Barry Clemens to the Seattle SuperSonics for Bob Kauffman and a 1971 3rd round draft pick (Clifford Ray was later selected).

=== September 9, 1969 ===
- The Chicago Bulls traded Mike Lynn to the Los Angeles Lakers for a 1971 3rd round draft pick (Mike Gale was later selected).

=== September 11, 1969 ===
- The Phoenix Suns waived Bob Warlick.

=== September 13, 1969 ===
- The Phoenix Suns traded Bill Melchionni to the Philadelphia 76ers for a 1970 2nd round draft pick (Joe DePre was later selected).

=== September 15, 1969 ===
- The Boston Celtics hired Tom Heinsohn as head coach.

=== September 18, 1969 ===
- The Los Angeles Lakers sold Freddie Crawford to the Milwaukee Bucks.

=== September 20, 1969 ===
- The Phoenix Suns traded Gene Tormohlen to the Atlanta Hawks for a 1970 3rd round draft pick (Vann Williford was later selected).

=== September 23, 1969 ===
- The Cincinnati Royals signed Johnny Green as a free agent.

=== October 1, 1969 ===
- The Phoenix Suns waived Dave Lattin.

=== October 4, 1969 ===
- The Cincinnati Royals traded Fred Hetzel to the Philadelphia 76ers for Craig Raymond and a future draft pick.

=== October 10, 1969 ===
- The Detroit Pistons traded Dave Gambee to the San Francisco Warriors for a future draft pick.

=== October 12, 1969 ===
- The Cincinnati Royals traded Walt Wesley to the Chicago Bulls for Dave Newmark and Norm Van Lier.
- The Cincinnati Royals traded Dave Newmark to the Atlanta Hawks for Wally Anderzunas and a 1972 3rd round draft pick (Ron Riley was later selected).

=== October 14, 1969 ===
- The Boston Celtics claimed Rich Niemann on waivers from the Milwaukee Bucks.
- The Chicago Bulls claimed Al Tucker on waivers from the Cincinnati Royals.
- The Detroit Pistons claimed Tom Workman on waivers from the Baltimore Bullets.

=== October 25, 1969 ===
- The San Francisco Warriors traded Jim King and Bill Turner to the Cincinnati Royals for Jerry Lucas.

=== October 26, 1969 ===
- The Seattle SuperSonics traded Art Harris to the Phoenix Suns for Dick Snyder.

=== November 1, 1969 ===
- The Seattle SuperSonics traded Erwin Mueller to the Detroit Pistons for a 1970 2nd round draft pick (Jake Ford was later selected).

=== November 18, 1969 ===
- The Cincinnati Royals traded Bill Dinwiddie to the Boston Celtics for Bob Cousy.

=== November 27, 1969 ===
- The Detroit Pistons traded Happy Hairston to the Los Angeles Lakers for Bill Hewitt and a 1970 3rd round draft pick (Jim Hayes was later selected).

=== December 9, 1969 ===
- The San Diego Rockets fired Jack McMahon as head coach.

=== December 10, 1969 ===
- The San Diego Rockets hired Alex Hannum as head coach.

=== December 25, 1969 ===
- The Cincinnati Royals traded Adrian Smith to the San Francisco Warriors for a 1970 2nd round draft pick (Tiny Archibald was later selected).

=== January 2, 1970 ===
- The Phoenix Suns fired Red Kerr as head coach.
- The Phoenix Suns appointed Jerry Colangelo as interim head coach.

=== January 5, 1970 ===
- The Baltimore Bullets traded Ed Manning to the Chicago Bulls for Al Tucker.

=== January 23, 1970 ===
- The Seattle SuperSonics sold John Tresvant to the Los Angeles Lakers.

=== January 27, 1970 ===
- The San Francisco Warriors fired George Lee as head coach.
- The San Francisco Warriors hired Al Attles as head coach.

=== February 1, 1970 ===
- The Detroit Pistons traded Walt Bellamy to the Atlanta Hawks for John Arthurs.
- The Detroit Pistons traded Eddie Miles and a 1970 4th round draft pick (Bill Stricker was later selected) to the Baltimore Bullets for Bob Quick and a 1970 2nd round draft pick (Ken Warzynski was later selected).

=== February 2, 1970 ===
The Atlanta Hawks traded Zelmo Beaty to the San Francisco Warriors for Clyde Lee and a 1970 1st round draft pick (Pete Maravich was later selected). Lee was sent as the player to be named later on October 4, 1974.

=== March 19, 1970 ===
- The Cleveland Cavaliers hired Bill Fitch as head coach.

=== March 23, 1970 ===
- The Baltimore Bullets traded Mike Davis and a 1970 1st round draft pick (John Hummer was later selected) to the Buffalo Braves for a 1970 1st round draft pick (George Johnson was later selected).

=== March 31, 1970 ===
The Buffalo Braves hired Dolph Schayes as head coach.

=== April 15, 1970 ===
The San Diego Rockets sold Don Kojis to the Seattle SuperSonics.

=== April 16, 1970 ===
The San Diego Rockets waived Justus Thigpen.

=== April 21, 1970 ===
The Portland Trail Blazers hired Rolland Todd as head coach. The Cincinnati Royals traded Oscar Robertson to the Milwaukee Bucks for Charlie Paulk and Flynn Robinson.

=== April 23, 1970 ===
The Phoenix Suns traded Jim Fox and a 1971 2nd round draft pick (Howard Porter was later selected) to the Chicago Bulls for Clem Haskins.

=== May 11, 1970 ===
- The Portland Trail Blazers drafted Rick Adelman from the San Diego Rockets in the NBA expansion draft.
- The Cleveland Cavaliers drafted Butch Beard from the Atlanta Hawks in the NBA expansion draft.
- The Buffalo Braves drafted Em Bryant from the Boston Celtics in the NBA expansion draft.
- The Portland Trail Blazers drafted Jerry Chambers from the Phoenix Suns in the NBA expansion draft.
- The Cleveland Cavaliers drafted Len Chappell from the Milwaukee Bucks in the NBA expansion draft.
- The Buffalo Braves drafted Freddie Crawford from the Milwaukee Bucks in the NBA expansion draft.
- The Cleveland Cavaliers drafted Johnny Egan from the Los Angeles Lakers in the NBA expansion draft.
- The Portland Trail Blazers drafted Leroy Ellis from the Baltimore Bullets in the NBA expansion draft.
- The Buffalo Braves drafted Dick Garrett from the Los Angeles Lakers in the NBA expansion draft.
- The Buffalo Braves drafted Herm Gilliam from the Cincinnati Royals in the NBA expansion draft.
- The Portland Trail Blazers drafted Fred Hetzel from the Philadelphia 76ers in the NBA expansion draft.
- The Buffalo Braves drafted Bill Hosket from the New York Knicks in the NBA expansion draft.
- The Buffalo Braves drafted Bailey Howell from the Boston Celtics in the NBA expansion draft.
- The Portland Trail Blazers drafted Joe Kennedy from the Seattle SuperSonics in the NBA expansion draft.
- The Cleveland Cavaliers drafted Bobby Lewis from the San Francisco Warriors in the NBA expansion draft.
- The Buffalo Braves drafted Paul Long from the Detroit Pistons in the NBA expansion draft.
- The Buffalo Braves drafted Mike Lynn from the Los Angeles Lakers in the NBA expansion draft.
- The Portland Trail Blazers drafted Ed Manning from the Chicago Bulls in the NBA expansion draft.
- The Buffalo Braves drafted Don May from the New York Knicks in the NBA expansion draft.
- The Portland Trail Blazers drafted Stan McKenzie (basketball) from the Phoenix Suns in the NBA expansion draft.
- The Cleveland Cavaliers drafted McCoy McLemore from the Detroit Pistons in the NBA expansion draft.
- The Cleveland Cavaliers drafted Don Ohl from the Atlanta Hawks in the NBA expansion draft.
- The Portland Trail Blazers drafted Dorie Murrey from the Seattle SuperSonics in the NBA expansion draft.
- The Cleveland Cavaliers drafted Loy Petersen from the Chicago Bulls in the NBA expansion draft.
- The Cleveland Cavaliers drafted Luther Rackley from the Cincinnati Royals in the NBA expansion draft.
- The Portland Trail Blazers drafted Pat Riley from the San Diego Rockets in the NBA expansion draft.
- The Portland Trail Blazers drafted Dale Schlueter from the San Francisco Warriors in the NBA expansion draft.
- The Buffalo Braves drafted Ray Scott from the Baltimore Bullets in the NBA expansion draft.
- The Portland Trail Blazers drafted Larry Siegfried from the Boston Celtics in the NBA expansion draft.
- The Cleveland Cavaliers drafted Bingo Smith from the San Diego Rockets in the NBA expansion draft.
- The Cleveland Cavaliers drafted John Warren from the New York Knicks in the NBA expansion draft.
- The Cleveland Cavaliers drafted Walt Wesley from the Chicago Bulls in the NBA expansion draft.
- The Buffalo Braves drafted George Wilson from the Philadelphia 76ers in the NBA expansion draft.
- The Buffalo Braves traded Bailey Howell to the Philadelphia 76ers for Bob Kauffman and a 1971 2nd round draft pick (Spencer Haywood was later selected).
- The Portland Trail Blazers traded Larry Siegfried to the San Diego Rockets for Jim Barnett.

=== May 20, 1970 ===
- The Los Angeles Lakers traded Mel Counts to the Phoenix Suns for Gail Goodrich.

=== June 17, 1970 ===
- The Portland Trail Blazers traded Jerry Chambers to the Atlanta Hawks for Gary Gregor.

=== June 20, 1970 ===
- The New York Knicks traded Nate Bowman and Mike Silliman to the Buffalo Braves for cash.
- The Baltimore Bullets signed Dennis Stewart as a free agent.
