= 1969–70 Cincinnati Royals season =

NBA professional basketball team season

- Head coach: Bob Cousy
- Owners: Max Jacobs; Jeremy Jacobs
- Arena: Cincinnati Gardens

Results
- Record: 36–46 (.439)
- Place: Division: 5th (Eastern)
- Playoff finish: Did not qualify
- Stats at Basketball Reference

Local media
- Television: WLWT
- Radio: WLW

The 1969–70 Cincinnati Royals season was one of the last years the franchise played in Cincinnati. In 1972, they moved to Kansas City. This was also the final season for Oscar Robertson, who went to the Milwaukee Bucks next season.

== History ==
After his death in 1968, Louis Jacob's sons took over the ownership of the team. The first move of the young Jacobses was to hire in Kansas City sports manager Joe Axelson, a relative unknown in NBA circles who had befriended the ownership family. Axelson replaced the outgoing GM, Pepper Wilson, who had served with the franchise since it arrived in Cincinnati in 1957. The three then were able to draw in former Boston College coach and Boston Celtics legend Bob Cousy for the then-very high salary of $100,000 per season to replace Cincinnati favorite Ed Jucker as coach. Cousy arrived to considerable press to his new team.

Cousy wanted a young running team and began shipping out veterans who did not follow his new program. Jerry Lucas, a three-time First Team All-Pro with Cincinnati, was traded to the San Francisco Warriors in exchange for guard Jim King and forward Bill Turner. King and Turner combined to average ten points per game that season, then left the following season. Turner in fact joined Lucas in San Francisco. Lucas played four more NBA seasons and was a San Francisco NBA All-Star in 1971.

Cousy also sent long-time Cincinnati favorite Adrian Smith to San Francisco. Cousy attempted to trade Oscar Robertson to the Baltimore Bullets for Gus Johnson. Robertson exercised his right to veto the trade. The team was known as "the Running Royals". Cincinnati topped the 110-point mark in each of the campaign's final 21 contests, and during a six-game span in mid-February, the team averaged 127 points.

Cousy spoke often of a youth movement for the team that year, but ended up starting 36-year-old Johnny Green, 33-year-old Connie Dierking and 30-year-old Oscar Robertson. Tom Van Arsdale joined Robertson as NBA All-Stars. He then took the ball out of the hands of Robertson, the NBA's all-time point guard, and gave it to rookie Norm Van Lier, who did turn in an impressive season.

Adding still more to the story was Bob Cousy's decision to play at age 41. In order to be activated, the Royals had to trade solid reserve Bill Dinwiddie to the Boston Celtics so that Red Auerbach could release him from the Boston retired list. Cousy played seven games in November, and played poorly, having not played in the NBA for five seasons. Despite the hype and changes, the team was clearly worse than it had been the previous season. But the Jacobses and Axelson were already looking to sell the team anyway. This season marked the beginning of the end of the Cincinnati Royals as a result. The Royals failed to qualify for the playoffs. The Royals finished in 5th place with a 36–46 record.

Following the season, Robertson was traded to the Milwaukee Bucks for Flynn Robinson and Charlie Paulk. In 10 seasons with the Royals, Robertson averaged 29.3 points, 10.3 assists, and 8.5 rebounds per game.

== Roster ==
Cincinnati Royals roster
Players

Pos.	No.	Player	Height	Weight	DOB	From
SF	21	Wally Anderzunas	6 ft 7 in (2.01 m)	220 lb (100 kg)		Creighton
PG	19	Bob Cousy	6 ft 1 in (1.85 m)	175 lb (79 kg)		Holy Cross
C	24	Connie Dierking	6 ft 9 in (2.06 m)	222 lb (101 kg)		Cincinnati
SF	15	Fred Foster	6 ft 5 in (1.96 m)	210 lb (95 kg)		Miami (OH)
SG	30	Herm Gilliam	6 ft 3 in (1.91 m)	190 lb (86 kg)		Purdue
PF	20	Johnny Green	6 ft 5 in (1.96 m)	200 lb (91 kg)		Michigan State
PG	17	Jim King	6 ft 2 in (1.88 m)	175 lb (79 kg)		Tulsa
C	22	Luther Rackley	6 ft 10 in (2.08 m)	220 lb (100 kg)		Xavier
PG	14	Oscar Robertson	6 ft 5 in (1.96 m)	205 lb (93 kg)		Cincinnati
PF	13	Bill Turner	6 ft 7 in (2.01 m)	220 lb (100 kg)		Akron
SF	5	Tom Van Arsdale	6 ft 5 in (1.96 m)	202 lb (92 kg)		Indiana
PG	23	Norm Van Lier	6 ft 1 in (1.85 m)	173 lb (78 kg)		Saint Francis (PA)

Coaches
Head coach
- (United States) Bob Cousy (Holy Cross)

Legend
- (DP) Unsigned draft pick
- (FA) Free agent
- (S) Suspended
- Injured

== Draft picks ==
The Royals first round pick was star guard Herm Gilliam of Purdue. Gilliam was lost for much of the 1969–70 season with mandatory military service. The following year, he was selected by Buffalo in the expansion draft.

Second pick Luther Rackley had starred locally at Xavier as a solid 6'10 big man. He played one year for the Royals and then was selected by Cleveland in the expansion draft. Slender 6'7 Luther Green was the third Royals pick. He found better chances with the ABA's New York Nets and signed there.

== Regular season ==
=== Season standings ===
Eastern Division	W	L	PCT	GB
x-New York Knicks	60	22	.732	–
x-Milwaukee Bucks	56	26	.683	4
x-Baltimore Bullets	50	32	.610	10
x-Philadelphia 76ers	42	40	.512	18
Cincinnati Royals	36	46	.439	24
Boston Celtics	34	48	.415	26
Detroit Pistons	31	51	.378	29

=== Season schedule ===
1969–70 Game log
#	Date	Opponent	Score	High points	Record
1	October 15	New York	94–89	Tom Van Arsdale (20)	0–1
2	October 17	@ Boston	110–108	Oscar Robertson (25)	1–1
3	October 18	Philadelphia	134–123	Luther Rackley (29)	1–2
4	October 22	Los Angeles	116–109	Tom Van Arsdale (24)	1–3
5	October 24	@ Baltimore	126–131 (OT)	Oscar Robertson (35)	1–4
6	October 25	@ Philadelphia	109–98	Connie Dierking (27)	2–4
7	October 30	@ Phoenix	104–106	Tom Van Arsdale (23)	2–5
8	October 31	@ Seattle	121–129	Oscar Robertson (30)	2–6
9	November 1	@ San Francisco	97–120	Oscar Robertson (26)	2–7
10	November 2	@ Los Angeles	124–116	Tom Van Arsdale (41)	3–7
11	November 5	San Diego	120–133	Oscar Robertson (33)	4–7
12	November 6	San Francisco	130–109	Tom Van Arsdale (18)	4–8
13	November 8	Baltimore	121–130	Oscar Robertson (38)	5–8
14	November 12	Boston	107–116	Oscar Robertson (25)	6–8
15	November 15	Detroit	105–104	Tom Van Arsdale (26)	6–9
16	November 18	@ New York	94–112	Johnny Green (16)	6–10
17	November 19	Los Angeles	116–103	Oscar Robertson (21)	6–11
18	November 21	Chicago	119–133	Oscar Robertson (41)	7–11
19	November 23	Phoenix	123–137	Oscar Robertson (39)	8–11
20	November 24	@ Milwaukee	129–104	Tom Van Arsdale (29)	9–11
21	November 28	N New York	106–105	Oscar Robertson (33)	9–12
22	November 29	@ Atlanta	111–128	Oscar Robertson (22)	9–13
23	November 30	Philadelphia	107–115	Tom Van Arsdale (31)	10–13
24	December 2	@ Baltimore	107–129	Oscar Robertson (32)	10–14
25	December 3	Seattle	118–117	Oscar Robertson (36)	10–15
26	December 5	Atlanta	127–156	Johnny Green (31)	11–15
27	December 6	@ Philadelphia	102–120	Fred Foster (27)	11–16
28	December 9	@ New York	103–101	Oscar Robertson (31)	12–16
29	December 10	Philadelphia	121–122	Oscar Robertson (35)	13–16
30	December 11	@ Detroit	116–119 (OT)	Oscar Robertson (44)	13–17
31	December 13	@ Phoenix	110–126	Fred Foster (19)	13–18
32	December 14	@ Phoenix	137–130 (2OT)	Oscar Robertson (37)	14–18
33	December 17	@ Seattle	104–117	Oscar Robertson (28)	14–19
34	December 19	@ Los Angeles	117–109	Connie Dierking (31)	15–19
35	December 20	@ San Diego	111–126	Oscar Robertson (33)	15–20
36	December 25	San Francisco	124–120 (OT)	Oscar Robertson (38)	15–21
37	December 26	N Atlanta	130–110	Oscar Robertson (28)	16–21
38	December 27	Milwaukee	110–112 (OT)	Oscar Robertson (31)	17–21
39	December 29	@ Detroit	110–103	Connie Dierking (29)	18–21
40	December 30	San Diego	120–125	Tom Van Arsdale (29)	19–21
41	January 2	@ Baltimore	116–118	Oscar Robertson (31)	19–22
42	January 3	@ Atlanta	104–102	Tom Van Arsdale (30)	20–22
43	January 4	Baltimore	128–129	Tom Van Arsdale (35)	21–22
44	January 6	Phoenix	124–128	Oscar Robertson (29)	22–22
45	January 7	@ Milwaukee	119–138	Fred Foster (32)	22–23
46	January 11	N Phoenix	125–118	Johnny Green (27)	22–24
47	January 13	N Milwaukee	112–92	Fred Foster (21)	22–25
48	January 15	@ Chicago	120–130	Tom Van Arsdale (28)	22–26
49	January 16	N Atlanta	100–117	Luther Rackley (23)	22–27
50	January 18	@ Philadelphia	116–141	Luther Rackley (25)	22–28
51	January 22	Boston	104–111	Oscar Robertson (40)	23–28
52	January 24	@ Milwaukee	109–125	Tom Van Arsdale (25)	23–29
53	January 25	Baltimore	122–129	Oscar Robertson (41)	24–29
54	January 26	N Chicago	116–115	Oscar Robertson (36)	25–29
55	January 28	Milwaukee	126–114	Johnny Green (25)	25–30
56	January 30	@ Boston	103–108	Tom Van Arsdale (25)	25–31
57	January 31	Detroit	115–117	Fred Foster (25)	26–31
58	February 1	@ Chicago	108–115	Johnny Green (27)	26–32
59	February 3	N Los Angeles	124–114	Tom Van Arsdale (36)	26–33
60	February 4	Seattle	121–115	Tom Van Arsdale (29)	26–34
61	February 6	New York	135–92	Tom Van Arsdale (21)	26–35
62	February 7	@ New York	114–121	Connie Dierking (24)	26–36
63	February 8	@ Boston	117–130	Tom Van Arsdale (38)	26–37
64	February 10	@ Detroit	117–115	Connie Dierking (30)	27–37
65	February 11	N Detroit	113–124	Tom Van Arsdale (32)	28–37
66	February 13	@ San Francisco	128–110	Tom Van Arsdale (34)	29–37
67	February 15	@ San Diego	123–150	Fred Foster (32)	29–38
68	February 18	N Atlanta	125–139 (OT)	Tom Van Arsdale (27)	29–39
69	February 21	Chicago	119–127	Tom Van Arsdale (30)	30–39
70	February 22	Philadelphia	116–136	Connie Dierking (45)	31–39
71	March 1	@ Milwaukee	114–120	Oscar Robertson (25)	31–40
72	March 2	N Baltimore	110–118	Oscar Robertson (28)	31–41
73	March 4	@ San Diego	127–125	Connie Dierking (31)	32–41
74	March 6	@ Seattle	122–126	Tom Van Arsdale (26)	32–42
75	March 7	@ San Francisco	121–119	Connie Dierking (33)	33–42
76	March 8	@ Los Angeles	116–144	Tom Van Arsdale (26)	33–43
77	March 11	Boston	144–127	Johnny Green (32)	33–44
78	March 12	San Diego	151–165	Tom Van Arsdale (36)	34–44
79	March 15	Seattle	113–116	Oscar Robertson (37)	35–44
80	March 16	N Chicago	140–142 (OT)	Tom Van Arsdale (42)	35–45
81	March 20	San Francisco	118–111	Tom Van Arsdale (32)	35–46
82	March 21	@ New York	136–120	Connie Dierking (35)	36–46

October 2–6 including a road win at Boston, November 8–7, December 9–8, the team finished December at a decent 19–21. January 7–10, including four-straight. February 5–8 and March 5–7 with the team tiring down the stretch. The team missed the playoffs by six games.

== Awards and records ==
- Oscar Robertson, All-NBA Second Team
