= Greacen =

Greacen is a surname. Notable people with the surname include:

- Bob Greacen (born 1947), American basketballer
- Edmund Greacen (1876–1949), American Impressionist painter
- Robert Greacen (1920–2008), Irish poet
- Stewart Greacen (born 1982), Scottish footballer
