= 1969–70 New York Knicks season =

Season of National Basketball Association team the New York Knicks

- NBA champions
- Division champions
- Head coach: Red Holzman
- General manager: Eddie Donovan
- Arena: Madison Square Garden

Results
- Record: 60–22 (.732)
- Place: Division: 1st (Eastern)
- Playoff finish: NBA champions (Defeated Lakers 4–3)
- Stats at Basketball Reference

Local media
- Television: WOR–TV 9 (Bob Wolff); Manhattan Cable Television (Bob Wolff and Marty Glickman)
- Radio: WHN–AM 1050 (Marv Albert)

The 1969–70 New York Knicks season was the 24th season of NBA basketball in New York City. The Knicks had a then single-season NBA record 18 straight victories en route to 60–22 record, which was the best regular season record in the team's history. They set the record for the best start in the first 24 games of a season at 23–1 before the Golden State Warriors surpassed it in 2015. After defeating the Bullets in the Eastern Division semifinals and the Milwaukee Bucks in the Eastern Division finals, the Knicks defeated the Los Angeles Lakers in seven games to capture their first NBA title.

The 1969–70 Knicks are considered to be among New York City's finest sporting championship teams, and are considered the greatest team in Knicks history and among the best in NBA history. Their journey was chronicled in various books and films, most recently in When the Garden was Eden for ESPN's 30 for 30 series.

== NBA draft ==
Round	Pick	Player	Position	Nationality	School/Club team
1	11	John Warren	G/F	United States	St. John's
2	26	Bill Bunting	F/C	United States	North Carolina
3	40	Eddie Mast	G	United States	Temple
4	54	Elnardo Webster		United States	Saint Peter's College
5	68	Gene Littles		United States	High Point
6	82	Dwight Durante		United States	Catawba College
7	96	Chris Thomforde		United States	Princeton
8	110	Jim Healey		United States	Rockhurst
9	124	Roger Walaszak		United States	Columbia
10	138	Frank McLaughlin		United States	Fordham
11	152	Marvin Lewis		United States	Long Island University, Southampton Campus
12	165	Bill O'Rourke		United States	St. John Fisher College
13	177	James Wyatt		United States	Northwestern State
14	186	Rich Travis		United States	Oklahoma City

== Roster ==
1969–70 New York Knicks roster
Players

Pos.	No.	Player	Height	Weight	DOB	From
SG	12	Dick Barnett	6 ft 4 in (1.93 m)	190 lb (86 kg)	1936–10–02	Tennessee State
C	17	Nate Bowman	6 ft 10 in (2.08 m)	230 lb (104 kg)	1945–03–19	Wichita State
SF	24	Bill Bradley	6 ft 5 in (1.96 m)	205 lb (93 kg)	1943–07–28	Princeton
PF	22	Dave DeBusschere	6 ft 6 in (1.98 m)	220 lb (100 kg)	1940–10–16	Detroit Mercy
PG	10	Walt Frazier	6 ft 4 in (1.93 m)	200 lb (91 kg)	1945–03–29	Southern Illinois
PF	20	Bill Jr. Hosket	6 ft 8 in (2.03 m)	225 lb (102 kg)	1946–12–20	Ohio State
PF	18	Phil Jackson (IN)	6 ft 8 in (2.03 m)	220 lb (100 kg)	1945-09-17	North Dakota
SF	5	Don May	6 ft 4 in (1.93 m)	200 lb (91 kg)	1946–01–03	Dayton
C	19	Willis Reed	6 ft 9 in (2.06 m)	235 lb (107 kg)	1942–06–25	Grambling State
SG	6	Mike Riordan	6 ft 4 in (1.93 m)	200 lb (91 kg)	1945–07–09	Providence
SF	33	Cazzie Russell	6 ft 5 in (1.96 m)	218 lb (99 kg)	1944–06–07	Michigan
SF	9	Dave Stallworth	6 ft 7 in (2.01 m)	200 lb (91 kg)	1941–12–20	Wichita State
SG	16	John Warren	6 ft 3 in (1.91 m)	180 lb (82 kg)	1947–07–07	St. John's

Coaches
Head coach
- Red Holzman

Legend
- (DP) Unsigned draft pick
- (FA) Free agent
- (S) Suspended
- Injured

Roster
Updated: 1970–05–08

== Preseason ==
=== Game log ===
1969–70 preseason game log
September/October

Game	Date	Time	Opponent	Score	Location	Attendance	Record

All times are EASTERN time

== Regular season ==
=== Standings ===
Eastern Division	W	L	PCT	GB
x-New York Knicks	60	22	.732	–
x-Milwaukee Bucks	56	26	.683	4
x-Baltimore Bullets	50	32	.610	10
x-Philadelphia 76ers	42	40	.512	18
Cincinnati Royals	36	46	.439	24
Boston Celtics	34	48	.415	26
Detroit Pistons	31	51	.378	29

x – clinched playoff spot

=== Game log ===
1969–70 game log (60–22) (Home: 30–11; Road: 27–10; Neutral: 3–1)
October (9–1) (Home: 6–1; Road: 3–0)

Game	Date	Time	Opponent	Score	Location	Attendance	Record
1	October 14, 1969		Seattle	126–101	Madison Square Garden		1–0
2	October 15, 1969		@ Cincinnati	94–89	Cincinnati Gardens		2–0
3	October 17, 1969		@ Chicago	116–87	Chicago Stadium		3–0
4	October 18, 1969		Los Angeles	99–96	Madison Square Garden		4–0
5	October 21, 1969		Phoenix	140–116	Madison Square Garden		5–0
6	October 23, 1969		San Francisco	109–112	Madison Square Garden		5–1
7	October 24, 1969		@ Detroit	116–92	Cobo Center		6–1
8	October 25, 1969		Baltimore	128–99	Madison Square Garden		7–1
9	October 28, 1969		Atlanta	128–104	Madison Square Garden		8–1
10	October 30, 1969		San Diego	123–110	Madison Square Garden		9–1

November (14–1) (Home: 6–1; Road: 7–0; Neutral: 1–0)

Game	Date	Time	Opponent	Score	Location	Attendance	Record
11	November 1, 1969		Milwaukee	112–108	Madison Square Garden		10–1
12	November 3, 1969		@ Milwaukee	109–93	MECCA Arena		11–1
13	November 4, 1969		@ Phoenix	116–99	Arizona Veterans Memorial Coliseum		12–1
14	November 7, 1969		@ San Diego	129–111	San Diego Sports Arena		13–1
15	November 9, 1969		@ Los Angeles	112–102	The Forum		14–1
16	November 11, 1969		@ San Francisco	116–103	Cow Palace		15–1
17	November 13, 1969		Chicago	114–99	Madison Square Garden		16–1
18	November 15, 1969		Boston	113–98	Madison Square Garden		17–1
19	November 18, 1969		Cincinnati	112–94	Madison Square Garden		18–1
20	November 21, 1969		@ Philadelphia	98–94	The Spectrum		19–1
21	November 22, 1969		Phoenix	128–114	Madison Square Garden		20–1
22	November 25, 1969		Los Angeles	103–96	Madison Square Garden		21–1
23	November 26, 1969		@ Atlanta	138–108	Alexander Memorial Coliseum		22–1
24	November 28, 1969		vs. Cincinnati (at Cleveland, OH)	106–105	Cleveland Arena		23–1
25	November 29, 1969		Detroit	98–110	Madison Square Garden		23–2

December (10–5) (Home: 5–3; Road: 4–2; Neutral: 1–0)

Game	Date	Time	Opponent	Score	Location	Attendance	Record
26	December 2, 1969		Seattle	129–109	Madison Square Garden		24–2
27	December 5, 1969		@ Baltimore	116–107	Baltimore Civic Center		25–2
28	December 6, 1969		Milwaukee	124–99	Madison Square Garden		26–2
29	December 9, 1969		Cincinnati	101–103	Madison Square Garden		26–3
30	December 10, 1969		@ Milwaukee	96–95	MECCA Arena		26–3
31	December 11, 1969		@ Seattle	105–112	Seattle Center Coliseum		27–4
32	December 13, 1969		Philadelphia	93–100	Madison Square Garden		27–5
33	December 16, 1969		Atlanta	124–125 (OT)	Madison Square Garden		27–6
34	December 19, 1969		@ Chicago	108–99	Chicago Stadium		28–6
35	December 20, 1969		Baltimore	128–91	Madison Square Garden		29–6
36	December 25, 1969		Detroit	112–111	Madison Square Garden		30–6
37	December 26, 1969		@ Los Angeles	106–114	The Forum		30–7
38	December 27, 1969		vs. Seattle (at Vancouver, BC)	119–117	Pacific Coliseum		31–7
39	December 28, 1969		@ Phoenix	135–116	Arizona Veterans Memorial Coliseum		32–7
40	December 30, 1969		Chicago	116–96	Madison Square Garden		33–7

January (12–4) (Home: 4–1; Road: 7–3; Neutral: 1–0)

Game	Date	Time	Opponent	Score	Location	Attendance	Record
41	January 2, 1970		@ Milwaukee	105–118	MECCA Arena		33–8
42	January 3, 1970		Boston	104–111	Madison Square Garden		33–9
43	January 6, 1970		@ Baltimore	129–99	Baltimore Civic Center		34–9
44	January 7, 1970		@ San Francisco	99–94	Cow Palace		35–9
45	January 9, 1970		@ San Francisco	123–93	Cow Palace		36–9
46	January 10, 1970		@ San Diego	115–123	San Diego Sports Arena		36–10
47	January 12, 1970		vs. Phoenix (at Salt Lake City, UT)	130–114	Salt Palace Acord Arena		37–10
48	January 16, 1970		@ Detroit	104–102	Cobo Center		38–10
49	January 18, 1970		@ Boston	102–109	Boston Garden		38–11
50	January 23, 1970		@ Chicago	120–117	Chicago Stadium		39–11
51	January 24, 1970		San Diego	127–114	Madison Square Garden		40–11
52	January 25, 1970		@ Boston	102–96	Boston Garden		41–11
53	January 27, 1970		Boston	133–100	Madison Square Garden		41–11
54	January 29, 1970		Detroit	127–106	Madison Square Garden		43–11
55	January 30, 1970		@ Philadelphia	104–100	The Spectrum		44–11
56	January 31, 1970		Chicago	123–104	Madison Square Garden		45–11

February (9–4) (Home: 6–2; Road: 3–2)

Game	Date	Time	Opponent	Score	Location	Attendance	Record
57	February 1, 1970		@ Detroit	117–111	Cobo Center		46–11
58	February 3, 1970		San Francisco	118–98	Madison Square Garden		47–11
59	February 4, 1970		@ Atlanta	96–111	Alexander Memorial Coliseum		47–12
60	February 6, 1970		@ Cincinnati	135–92	Cincinnati Gardens		48–12
61	February 7, 1970		Cincinnati	121–114	Madison Square Garden		49–12
62	February 11, 1970		Boston	118–125 (OT)	Madison Square Garden		49–13
63	February 13, 1970		@ Philadelphia	151–106	The Spectrum		50–13
64	February 14, 1970		Philadelphia	116–114	Madison Square Garden		51–13
65	February 17, 1970		Los Angeles	114–93	Madison Square Garden		52–13
66	February 21, 1970		Atlanta	106–122	Madison Square Garden		52–14
67	February 22, 1970		@ Baltimore	104–110	Baltimore Civic Center		52–15
68	February 24, 1970		Phoenix	121–105	Madison Square Garden		53–15
69	February 28, 1970		Baltimore	115–101	Madison Square Garden		54–15

March (6–7) (Home: 3–3; Road: 3–3; Neutral: 0–1)

Game	Date	Time	Opponent	Score	Location	Attendance	Record
70	March 3, 1970		San Francisco	115–100	Madison Square Garden		55–15
71	March 6, 1970		San Diego	107–103	Madison Square Garden		56–15
72	March 7, 1970		@ Philadelphia	111–104	The Spectrum		57–15
73	March 8, 1970		Philadelphia	116–133	Madison Square Garden		57–16
74	March 10, 1970		Seattle	117–99	Madison Square Garden		58–16
75	March 13, 1970		vs. Seattle (at Portland, OR)	103–115	Memorial Coliseum		58–17
76	March 14, 1970		@ San Diego	119–103	San Diego Sports Arena		59–17
77	March 15, 1970		@ Los Angeles	101–106	The Forum		59–18
78	March 17, 1970		@ Detroit	122–106	Cobo Center		60–18
79	March 18, 1970		Milwaukee	108–116	Madison Square Garden		60–19
80	March 20, 1970		@ Atlanta	102–110	Alexander Memorial Coliseum		60–20
81	March 21, 1970		Cincinnati	120–136	Madison Square Garden		60–21
82	March 22, 1970		@ Boston	112–115	Boston Garden		60–22

1969–70 Schedule

All times are EASTERN time

== Playoffs ==
1970 playoff game log
Division Semifinals: 4–3 (home: 3–1; road: 1–2)

Game	Date	Team	Score	High points	High rebounds	High assists	Location Attendance	Series
1	March 26	Baltimore	W 120–117	Willis Reed (30)	Dave DeBusschere (24)	Walt Frazier (8)	Madison Square Garden; 19,500	1–0
2	March 27	@ Baltimore	W 106–99	Willis Reed (27)	Willis Reed (17)	Frazier, Barnett (6)	Baltimore Civic Center; 12,289	2–0
3	March 29	Baltimore	L 113–127	Walt Frazier (24)	Dave DeBusschere (10)	Walt Frazier (5)	Madison Square Garden; 19,500	2–1
4	March 31	@ Baltimore	L 92–102	Walt Frazier (25)	Willis Reed (15)	Walt Frazier (7)	Baltimore Civic Center; 12,289	2–2
5	April 2	Baltimore	W 101–80	Willis Reed (36)	Willis Reed (36)	Walt Frazier (6)	Madison Square Garden; 19,500	3–2
6	April 5	@ Baltimore	L 87–96	Walt Frazier (18)	Willis Reed (16)	Walt Frazier (5)	Baltimore Civic Center; 12,289	3–3
7	April 6	Baltimore	W 127–114	DeBusschere, Barnett (28)	Willis Reed (14)	Walt Frazier (8)	Madison Square Garden; 19,500	4–3

Division Finals: 4–1 (home: 3–0; road: 1–1)

Game	Date	Team	Score	High points	High rebounds	High assists	Location Attendance	Series
1	April 11	Milwaukee	W 110–102	Willis Reed (24)	Dave DeBusschere (10)	Bill Bradley (6)	Madison Square Garden; 19,500	1–0
2	April 13	Milwaukee	W 112–111	Willis Reed (36)	Willis Reed (19)	Walt Frazier (14)	Madison Square Garden; 19,500	2–0
3	April 17	@ Milwaukee	L 96–101	Willis Reed (21)	Reed, DeBusschere (10)	Walt Frazier (7)	Milwaukee Arena; 10,746	2–1
4	April 19	@ Milwaukee	W 117–105	Willis Reed (26)	Walt Frazier (11)	Dick Barnett (8)	Milwaukee Arena; 10,746	3–1
5	April 20	Milwaukee	W 132–96	Willis Reed (32)	Dave DeBusschere (11)	Walt Frazier (6)	Madison Square Garden; 19,500	4–1

NBA Finals: 4–3 (home: 3–1; road: 1–2)

Game	Date	Team	Score	High points	High rebounds	High assists	Location Attendance	Series
1	April 24	Los Angeles	W 124–112	Willis Reed (37)	Reed, DeBusschere (16)	Dick Barnett (9)	Madison Square Garden; 19,500	1–0
2	April 27	Los Angeles	L 103–105	Willis Reed (29)	Willis Reed (15)	Walt Frazier (11)	Madison Square Garden; 19,500	1–1
3	April 29	@ Los Angeles	W 111–108 (OT)	Willis Reed (38)	Willis Reed (17)	Walt Frazier (7)	The Forum; 17,500	2–1
4	May 1	@ Los Angeles	L 115–121 (OT)	Dick Barnett (29)	Dave Stallworth (13)	Walt Frazier (11)	The Forum; 17,509	2–2
5	May 4	Los Angeles	W 107–100	Walt Frazier (21)	Cazzie Russell (8)	Walt Frazier (12)	Madison Square Garden; 19,500	3–2
6	May 6	@ Los Angeles	L 113–135	Dave DeBusschere (25)	Dave DeBusschere (9)	Dick Barnett (8)	The Forum; 17,509	3–3
7	May 8	Los Angeles	W 113–99	Walt Frazier (36)	Dave DeBusschere (7)	Walt Frazier (19)	Madison Square Garden; 19,500	4–3

1970 schedule

== Player statistics ==
Legend
GP	Games played	GS	Games started	MPG	Minutes per game
FG%	Field-goal percentage	3P%	3-point field-goal percentage	FT%	Free-throw percentage
RPG	Rebounds per game	APG	Assists per game	SPG	Steals per game
BPG	Blocks per game	PPG	Points per game

=== Season ===
Player	Games played	Games started	Minutes played	Field goals	Free throws	Rebounds	Assists	Points
Willis Reed	81		3089	702	351	1126	161	1755
Walt Frazier	77		3040	600	409	465	629	1609
Dick Barnett	82		2772	494	232	221	298	1220
Dave DeBusschere	79		2627	488	176	790	194	1152
Bill Bradley	67		2098	413	145	239	268	971
Cazzie Russell	78		1563	385	124	236	135	894
Dave Stallworth	82		1375	239	161	323	139	639
Mike Riordan	81		1677	255	114	194	201	624
Nate Bowman	81		744	98	41	257	46	237
Bill Hosket	36		235	46	26	63	17	118
John Warren	44		272	44	24	40	30	112
Don May	37		238	39	18	52	17	96
Knicks	82		19730	3803	1821	4006	2135	9427

New York Knicks statistics
Player	GP	GS	MPG	FG%	3P%	FT%	RPG	APG	SPG	BPG	PPG
Dick Barnett	82		33.8	6.0		2.8	2.7	3.6			14.9
Nate Bowman	81		9.2	1.2		0.5	3.2	0.6			2.9
Bill Bradley	67		31.3	6.2		2.2	10.0	2.5			14.5
Dave DeBusschere	79		33.3	6.2		2.2	10.0	2.5			14.6
Walt Frazier	77		39.5	7.8		5.3	6.0	8.2			20.9
Bill Hosket	36		6.5	1.3		0.7	1.8	0.5			3.3
Don May	37		6.5	1.1		0.5	1.4	0.5			2.6
Willis Reed	81		38.1	8.7		4.3	13.9	2.0			21.7
Mike Riordan	81		20.7	3.1		1.4	2.4	2.5			7.7
Cazzie Russell	78		20.0	4.9		1.6	3.0	1.7			11.5
Dave Stallworth	82		16.8	2.9		2.0	3.9	1.7			7.8
John Warren	44		6.2	1.0		0.5	0.9	0.7			2.5
New York Knicks	82		240.6	46.4		22.2	48.9	26.0			115.0

=== Opponents ===
==== Vs. Atlanta ====
Regular-season series
New York lost 2–4 in the regular-season series

October 28, 1969

Recap

Atlanta Hawks 104, New York Knicks 128

Madison Square Garden, New York City

November 26, 1969

Recap

New York Knicks 138, Atlanta Hawks 108

Alexander Memorial Coliseum, Atlanta

December 16, 1969

Recap

Atlanta Hawks 125, New York Knicks 124 (OT)

Madison Square Garden, New York City

February 4, 1970

Recap

New York Knicks 96, Atlanta Hawks 111

Alexander Memorial Coliseum, Atlanta

February 21, 1970

Recap

Atlanta Hawks 122, New York Knicks 106

Madison Square Garden, New York City

March 20, 1970

Recap

New York Knicks 102, Atlanta Hawks 110

Alexander Memorial Coliseum, Atlanta

Team	Games played	Minutes played	Field goals	Free throws	Rebounds	Assists	Points
Knicks	6	293	282	130			694
Hawks	6	293	279	122			680

==== Vs. Baltimore ====
Regular-season series
New York won 5–1 in the regular-season series

October 25, 1969

Recap

Baltimore Bullets 99, New York Knicks 128

Madison Square Garden, New York City

December 5, 1969

Recap

New York Knicks 116, Baltimore Bullets 107

Baltimore Civic Center, Baltimore

December 20, 1969

Recap

Baltimore Bullets 91, New York Knicks 128

Madison Square Garden, New York City

January 6, 1970

Recap

New York Knicks 129, Baltimore Bullets 99

Baltimore Civic Center, Baltimore

February 22, 1970

Recap

New York Knicks 104, Baltimore Bullets 110

Baltimore Civic Center, Baltimore

February 28, 1970

Recap

Baltimore Bullets 101, New York Knicks 115

Madison Square Garden, New York City

Team	Games played	Minutes played	Field goals	Free throws	Rebounds	Assists	Points
Knicks	6	288	254	127			710
Bullets	6	288	236	135			607

==== Vs. Boston ====
Regular-season series
New York lost 3–4 in the regular-season series

November 15, 1969

Recap

Boston Celtics 98, New York Knicks 113

Madison Square Garden, New York City

January 3, 1970

Recap

Boston Celtics 111, New York Knicks 104

Madison Square Garden, New York City

January 18, 1970

Recap

New York Knicks 102, Boston Celtics 109

Boston Garden, Boston

January 25, 1970

Recap

New York Knicks 102, Boston Celtics 96

Boston Garden, Boston

January 27, 1970

Recap

Boston Celtics 100, New York Knicks 133

Madison Square Garden, New York City

February 11, 1970

Recap

Boston Celtics 125, New York Knicks 118 (OT)

Madison Square Garden, New York City

March 22, 1970

Recap

New York Knicks 112, Boston Celtics 115

Boston Garden, Boston

Team	Games played	Minutes played	Field goals	Free throws	Rebounds	Assists	Points
Knicks	7	341	302	180			784
Celtics	7	341	281	192			754

==== Vs. Chicago ====
Regular-season series
New York won 6–0 in the regular-season series

October 17, 1969

Recap

New York Knicks 116, Chicago Bulls 87

Chicago Stadium, Chicago, Illinois

November 13, 1969

Recap

Chicago Bulls 99, New York Knicks 114

Madison Square Garden, New York City

December 19, 1969

Recap

New York Knicks 108, Chicago Bulls 99

Chicago Stadium, Chicago, Illinois

December 30, 1969

Recap

Chicago Bulls 96, New York Knicks 116

Madison Square Garden, New York City

January 23, 1970

Recap

New York Knicks 120, Chicago Bulls 117

Chicago Stadium, Chicago, Illinois

January 31, 1970

Recap

Chicago Bulls 104, New York Knicks 123

Madison Square Garden, New York City

Team	Games played	Minutes played	Field goals	Free throws	Rebounds	Assists	Points
Knicks	6	288	292	113			697
Bulls	6	288	223	156			602

==== Vs. Cincinnati ====
Regular-season series
New York won 5–2 in the regular-season series

October 15, 1969

Recap

New York Knicks 94, Cincinnati Royals 89

Cincinnati Gardens, Cincinnati, Ohio

November 18, 1969

Recap

Cincinnati Royals 94, New York Knicks 112

Madison Square Garden, New York City

November 28, 1969

Recap

New York Knicks 106, Cincinnati Royals 105

Cleveland Arena, Cleveland, Ohio

December 9, 1969

Recap

Cincinnati Royals 103, New York Knicks 101

Madison Square Garden, New York City

February 6, 1970

Recap

New York Knicks 135, Cincinnati Royals 92

Cincinnati Gardens, Cincinnati

February 7, 1970

Recap

Cincinnati Royals 114, New York Knicks 121

Madison Square Garden, New York City

March 21, 1970

Recap

Cincinnati Royals 136, New York Knicks 120

Madison Square Garden, New York City

Team	Games played	Minutes played	Field goals	Free throws	Rebounds	Assists	Points
Knicks	7	336	313	163			789
Royals	7	336	271	171			713

==== Vs. Detroit ====
Regular-season series
New York won 6–1 in the regular-season series

October 24, 1969

Recap

New York Knicks 116, Detroit Pistons 92

Cobo Center, Detroit, Michigan

November 29, 1969

Recap

Detroit Pistons 110, New York Knicks 98

Madison Square Garden, New York City

December 25, 1969

Recap

Detroit Pistons 111, New York Knicks 112

Madison Square Garden, New York City

January 16, 1970

Recap

New York Knicks 104, Detroit Pistons 102

Cobo Center, Detroit, Michigan

January 29, 1970

Recap

Detroit Pistons 106, New York Knicks 127

Madison Square Garden, New York City

February 1, 1970

Recap

New York Knicks 117, Detroit Pistons 111

Cobo Center, Detroit, Michigan

March 17, 1970

Recap

New York Knicks 122, Detroit Pistons 106

Cobo Center, Detroit, Michigan

Team	Games played	Minutes played	Field goals	Free throws	Rebounds	Assists	Points
Knicks	7	336	317	162			796
Pistons	7	336	290	158			738

==== Vs. Los Angeles ====
Regular-season series
New York won 4–2 in the regular-season series

October 18, 1969

Recap

Los Angeles Lakers 96, New York Knicks 99

Madison Square Garden, New York City

November 9, 1969

Recap

New York Knicks 112, Los Angeles Lakers 102

The Forum, Inglewood, California

November 25, 1969

Recap

Los Angeles Lakers 96, New York Knicks 103

Madison Square Garden, New York City

December 26, 1969

Recap

New York Knicks 106, Los Angeles Lakers 114

The Forum, Inglewood, California

February 17, 1970

Recap

Los Angeles Lakers 93, New York Knicks 114

Madison Square Garden, New York City

March 15, 1970

Recap

New York Knicks 101, Los Angeles Lakers 106

The Forum, Inglewood, California

Team	Games played	Minutes played	Field goals	Free throws	Rebounds	Assists	Points
Knicks	6	288	254	127			635
Lakers	6	288	236	135			607

==== Vs. Milwaukee ====
Regular-season series
New York won 4–2 in the regular-season series

November 1, 1969

Recap

Milwaukee Bucks 108, New York Knicks 112

Madison Square Garden, New York City

November 3, 1969

Recap

New York Knicks 109, Milwaukee Bucks 93

MECCA Arena, Milwaukee

December 6, 1969

Recap

Milwaukee Bucks 99, New York Knicks 124

Madison Square Garden, New York City

December 10, 1969

Recap

New York Knicks 96, Milwaukee Bucks 95

MECCA Arena, Milwaukee

January 2, 1970

Recap

New York Knicks 105, Milwaukee Bucks 118

MECCA Arena, Milwaukee

March 18, 1970

Recap

Milwaukee Bucks 116, New York Knicks 108

Madison Square Garden, New York City

Team	Games played	Minutes played	Field goals	Free throws	Rebounds	Assists	Points
Knicks	6	288	277	100			654
Bucks	6	288	252	125			629

==== Vs. Philadelphia ====
Regular-season series
New York won 5–2 in the regular-season series

November 21, 1969

Recap

New York Knicks 98, Philadelphia 76ers 94

Spectrum, Philadelphia

December 13, 1969

Recap

Philadelphia 76ers 100, New York Knicks 93

Madison Square Garden, New York City

January 30, 1970

Recap

New York Knicks 104, Philadelphia 76ers 100

Spectrum, Philadelphia

February 13, 1970

Recap

New York Knicks 151, Philadelphia 76ers 106

Spectrum, Philadelphia

February 14, 1970

Recap

Philadelphia 76ers 114, New York Knicks 116

Madison Square Garden, New York City

March 7, 1970

Recap

New York Knicks 111, Philadelphia 76ers 104

Spectrum, Philadelphia

March 8, 1970

Recap

Philadelphia 76ers 133, New York Knicks 116

Madison Square Garden, New York City

Team	Games played	Minutes played	Field goals	Free throws	Rebounds	Assists	Points
Knicks	7	336	309	178			789
76ers	7	336	294	163			751

==== Vs. Phoenix ====
Regular-season series
New York won 6–0 in the regular-season series

October 21, 1969

Recap

Phoenix Suns 116, New York Knicks 140

Madison Square Garden, New York City

November 4, 1969

Recap

New York Knicks 116, Phoenix Suns 99

Arizona Veterans Memorial Coliseum, Phoenix, Arizona

November 22, 1969

Recap

Phoenix Suns 114, New York Knicks 128

Madison Square Garden, New York City

December 28, 1969

Recap

New York Knicks 135, Phoenix Suns 116

Arizona Veterans Memorial Coliseum, Phoenix, Arizona

January 12, 1970

Recap

New York Knicks 130, Phoenix Suns 114

Salt Palace Acord Arena, Salt Lake City

February 24, 1970

Recap

Phoenix Suns 105, New York Knicks 121

Madison Square Garden, New York City

Team	Games played	Minutes played	Field goals	Free throws	Rebounds	Assists	Points
Knicks	6	288	310	150			770
Suns	6	288	246	172			664

==== Vs. San Diego ====
Regular-season series
New York won 5–1 in the regular-season series

October 30, 1969

Recap

San Diego Rockets 110, New York Knicks 123

Madison Square Garden, New York City

November 7, 1969

Recap

New York Knicks 129, San Diego Rockets 111

San Diego Sports Arena, San Diego, California

January 10, 1970

Recap

New York Knicks 115, San Diego Rockets 123

San Diego Sports Arena, San Diego, California

January 24, 1970

Recap

San Diego Rockets 114, New York Knicks 127

Madison Square Garden, New York City

March 6, 1970

Recap

San Diego Rockets 103, New York Knicks 107

Madison Square Garden, New York City

March 14, 1970

Recap

New York Knicks 119, San Diego Rockets 103

San Diego Sports Arena, San Diego, California

Team	Games played	Minutes played	Field goals	Free throws	Rebounds	Assists	Points
Knicks	6	288	294	132			720
Rockets	6	288	232	200			664

==== Vs. San Francisco ====
Regular-season series
New York won 5–1 in the regular-season series

October 23, 1969

Recap

San Francisco Warriors 112, New York Knicks 109

Madison Square Garden, New York City

November 11, 1969

Recap

New York Knicks 116, San Francisco Warriors 103

Cow Palace, San Francisco

January 7, 1970

Recap

New York Knicks 99, San Francisco Warriors 94

Cow Palace, San Francisco

January 9, 1970

Recap

New York Knicks 123, San Francisco Warriors 93

Cow Palace, San Francisco

February 3, 1970

Recap

San Francisco Warriors 98, New York Knicks 118

Madison Square Garden, New York City

March 3, 1970

Recap

San Francisco Warriors 100, New York Knicks 115

Madison Square Garden, New York City

Team	Games played	Minutes played	Field goals	Free throws	Rebounds	Assists	Points
Knicks	6	288	274	132			680
Warriors	6	288	228	144			600

==== Vs. Seattle ====
Regular-season series
New York won 4–2 in the regular-season series

October 14, 1969

Recap

Seattle SuperSonics 101, New York Knicks 126

Madison Square Garden, New York City

December 2, 1969

Recap

Seattle SuperSonics 109, New York Knicks 129

Madison Square Garden, New York City

December 11, 1969

Recap

New York Knicks 105, Seattle SuperSonics 112

Seattle Center Coliseum, Seattle

December 27, 1969

Recap

New York Knicks 119, Seattle SuperSonics 117

Pacific Coliseum, Vancouver, British Columbia

March 10, 1970

Recap

Seattle SuperSonics 99, New York Knicks 117

Madison Square Garden, New York City

March 13, 1970

Recap

New York Knicks 103, Seattle SuperSonics 115

Memorial Coliseum, Portland, Oregon

Team	Games played	Minutes played	Field goals	Free throws	Rebounds	Assists	Points
Knicks	6	288	283	133			699
SuperSonics	6	288	240	173			653

==== Total ====
Team	Games played	Minutes played	Field goals	Free throws	Rebounds	Assists	Points
Opponents	82	19730	3308	2062			8682

New York Knicks statistics
Player	GP	GS	MPG	FG%	3P%	FT%	RPG	APG	SPG	BPG	PPG
New York Knicks	82		240.6	40.3		25.1					105.9

=== Playoffs ===
Player	Games played	Games started	Minutes played	Field goals	Free throws	Rebounds	Assists	Points
Willis Reed	18		732	178	351	70	51	426
Dick Barnett	19		714	131	59	39	64	321
Dave DeBusschere	19		701	130	45	220	46	305
Walt Frazier	19		834	118	68	149	156	304
Bill Bradley	19		616	100	35	72	60	235
Cazzie Russell	19		306	80	18	47	16	178
Dave Stallworth	19		275	61	15	77	20	137
Mike Riordan	19		296	53	25	46	27	131
Nate Bowman	18		128	18	7	44	6	43
Bill Hosket	5		29	4	3	5	2	11
Don May	2		7	2	0	3	2	4
John Warren	10		22	2	0	3	2	4
Knicks	19		4660	877	345	950	450	2099

New York Knicks statistics
Player	GP	GS	MPG	FG%	3P%	FT%	RPG	APG	SPG	BPG	PPG
Dick Barnett	19		37.6	6.9		3.1	2.1	3.4			16.9
Nate Bowman	18		7.1	1.0		0.4	2.4	0.3			2.4
Bill Bradley	19		32.4	5.3		1.8	3.8	3.2			12.4
Dave DeBusschere	19		36.9	6.8		2.4	11.6	2.4			16.1
Walt Frazier	19		43.9	6.2		3.6	7.8	8.2			16.0
Bill Hosket	5		5.8	0.8		0.6	1.0	0.4			2.2
Don May	10		3.5	1.0		0.0	0.0	0.0			2.0
Willis Reed	18		40.7	9.9		3.9	13.8	2.8			23.7
Mike Riordan	19		15.6	2.8		1.3	2.4	1.4			6.9
Cazzie Russell	19		16.1	4.2		0.9	2.5	0.8			9.4
Dave Stallworth	19		14.5	3.2		0.8	4.1	1.1			7.2
John Warren	2		2.2	0.2		0.0	0.3	0.2			0.4
New York Knicks	19		256.3	48.3		18.8	51.8	24.2			115.6

=== Opponents ===
==== 1970 NBA Eastern Division Semifinals: vs. Baltimore ====
Regular-season series
New York won 4–3 in the 1970 NBA Eastern Division Semifinals

March 26, 1970

Recap

Baltimore Bullets 117, New York Knicks 120 (2OT)

Madison Square Garden, New York City

March 27, 1970

Recap

New York Knicks 106, Baltimore Bullets 99

Baltimore Civic Center, Baltimore

March 29, 1970

Recap

Baltimore Bullets 127, New York Knicks 113

Madison Square Garden, New York City

March 31, 1970

Recap

New York Knicks 92, Baltimore Bullets 102

Baltimore Civic Center, Baltimore, Maryland

April 2, 1970

Recap

Baltimore Bullets 80, New York Knicks 101

Madison Square Garden, New York City

April 5, 1970

Recap

New York Knicks 87, Baltimore Bullets 96

Baltimore Civic Center, Baltimore

April 6, 1970

Recap

Baltimore Bullets 114, New York Knicks 127

Madison Square Garden, New York City

Team	Games played	Minutes played	Field goals	Free throws	Rebounds	Assists	Points
Knicks	7	346	307	137			746
Bullets	7	346	286	163			735

==== 1970 NBA Eastern Division Finals: vs. Milwaukee ====
Regular-season series
New York won 4–1 in the 1970 NBA Eastern Division Finals

April 11, 1970

Recap

Milwaukee Bucks 102, New York Knicks 110

Madison Square Garden, New York City

April 13, 1970

Recap

Milwaukee Bucks 111, New York Knicks 112

Madison Square Garden, New York City

April 17, 1970

Recap

New York Knicks 96, Milwaukee Bucks 101

MECCA Arena, Milwaukee, Wisconsin

April 19, 1970

Recap

New York Knicks 117, Milwaukee Bucks 105

MECCA Arena, Milwaukee

April 20, 1970

Recap

Milwaukee Bucks 106, New York Knicks 132

Madison Square Garden, New York City

Team	Games played	Minutes played	Field goals	Free throws	Rebounds	Assists	Points
Knicks	5	240	238	91			567
Bucks	5	240	208	99			515

==== 1970 NBA Finals vs. Los Angeles ====
1970 NBA Finals
New York won 4–3 in the 1970 NBA Finals

April 24, 1970

Recap

Los Angeles Lakers 112, New York Knicks 124

Madison Square Garden, New York City

April 27, 1970

Recap

Los Angeles Lakers 105, New York Knicks 103

Madison Square Garden, New York City

April 29, 1970

Recap

New York Knicks 111, Los Angeles Lakers 108 (OT)

The Forum, Inglewood, California

May 1, 1970

Recap

New York Knicks 115, Los Angeles Lakers 121 (OT)

The Forum, Inglewood, California

May 4, 1970

Recap

Los Angeles Lakers 100, New York Knicks 107

Madison Square Garden, New York City

May 6, 1970

Recap

New York Knicks 113, Los Angeles Lakers 135

The Forum, Inglewood, California

May 8, 1970

Recap

Los Angeles Lakers 99, New York Knicks 113

Madison Square Garden, New York City

Team	Games played	Minutes played	Field goals	Free throws	Rebounds	Assists	Points
Knicks	7	346	332	122			786
Lakers	7	346	302	176			780

==== Total ====
Team	Games played	Minutes played	Field goals	Free throws	Rebounds	Assists	Points
Opponents	19	922	796	438			2030

New York Knicks statistics
Player	GP	GS	MPG	FG%	3P%	FT%	RPG	APG	SPG	BPG	PPG
New York Knicks	19		48.5	41.9		23.1					106.8

== Media ==
=== Local TV ===
Date	Opponent	Channel
October 15, 1969	@ Cincinnati	WOR-TV
October 17, 1969	@ Chicago	WOR-TV
October 24, 1969	@ Detroit	WOR-TV
November 3, 1969	@ Milwaukee	WOR-TV
November 26, 1969	@ Atlanta	WOR-TV
December 5, 1969	@ Baltimore	WOR-TV
December 10, 1969	@ Milwaukee	WOR-TV
January 6, 1970	@ Baltimore	WOR-TV
February 4, 1970	@ Atlanta	WOR-TV
March 20, 1970	@ Atlanta	WOR-TV
March 27, 1970	@ Baltimore	WOR-TV
March 31, 1970	@ Baltimore	WOR-TV
April 17, 1970	@ Milwaukee	WOR-TV

Some New York Knicks TV Games never aired on WOR-TV because of broadcast conflict with the New York Rangers (NHL).

=== Local cable TV ===
Date	Opponent	Cable TV
October 14, 1969	Seattle	Manhattan Cable Television
October 18, 1969	Los Angeles	Manhattan Cable Television
October 21, 1969	Phoenix	Manhattan Cable Television
October 23, 1969	San Francisco	Manhattan Cable Television
October 25, 1969	Baltimore	Manhattan Cable Television
October 28, 1969	Atlanta	Manhattan Cable Television
October 30, 1969	San Diego	Manhattan Cable Television
November 1, 1969	Milwaukee	Manhattan Cable Television
November 22, 1969	Phoenix	Manhattan Cable Television
December 6, 1969	Milwaukee	Manhattan Cable Television
December 16, 1969	Atlanta	Manhattan Cable Television
December 20, 1969	Baltimore	Manhattan Cable Television
February 21, 1970	Atlanta	Manhattan Cable Television
February 24, 1970	Phoenix	Manhattan Cable Television
February 28, 1970	Baltimore	Manhattan Cable Television
March 18, 1970	Milwaukee	Manhattan Cable Television
March 26, 1970	Baltimore	Manhattan Cable Television
April 2, 1970	Baltimore	Manhattan Cable Television
April 6, 1970	Baltimore	Manhattan Cable Television
April 13, 1970	Milwaukee	Manhattan Cable Television
April 20, 1970	Milwaukee	Manhattan Cable Television

=== National TV ===
Date	Opponent	Network	Play-by-play	Color analyst
January 2, 1970	@ Milwaukee	ABC		
February 22, 1970	@ Baltimore	ABC		
March 29, 1970	Baltimore	ABC		
April 5, 1970	@ Baltimore	ABC		
April 11, 1970	Milwaukee	ABC		
April 19, 1970	@ Milwaukee	ABC		
April 24, 1970	Los Angeles	ABC	Chris Schenkel	Jack Twyman
April 27, 1970	Los Angeles	ABC	Chris Schenkel	Jack Twyman
April 29, 1970	@ Los Angeles	ABC	Chris Schenkel	Jack Twyman
May 1, 1970	@ Los Angeles	ABC	Chris Schenkel	Jack Twyman
May 4, 1970	Los Angeles	ABC	Chris Schenkel	Jack Twyman
May 6, 1970	@ Los Angeles	ABC	Chris Schenkel	Jack Twyman
May 8, 1970	Los Angeles	ABC	Chris Schenkel	Jack Twyman

=== Local radio ===
Date	Opponent	Flagship station
October 14, 1969	Seattle	WHN
October 17, 1969	@ Chicago	WHN
October 18, 1969	Los Angeles	WHN
October 21, 1969	Phoenix	WHN
October 23, 1969	San Francisco	WHN
October 24, 1969	@ Detroit	WHN
October 25, 1969	Baltimore	WHN
October 28, 1969	Atlanta	WHN
October 30, 1969	San Diego	WHN
November 1, 1969	Milwaukee	WHN
November 3, 1969	@ Milwaukee	WHN
December 5, 1969	@ Baltimore	WHN
December 6, 1969	Milwaukee	WHN
December 16, 1969	Atlanta	WHN
December 20, 1969	Baltimore	WHN
January 2, 1970	@ Milwaukee	WHN
January 6, 1970	@ Baltimore	WHN
February 21, 1970	Atlanta	WHN
February 22, 1970	@ Baltimore	WHN
February 28, 1970	Baltimore	WHN
March 18, 1970	Milwaukee	WHN
March 20, 1970	@ Atlanta	WHN
March 26, 1970	Baltimore	WHN
March 27, 1970	@ Baltimore	WHN
March 29, 1970	Baltimore	WHN
March 31, 1970	@ Baltimore	WHN
April 2, 1970	Baltimore	WHN
April 6, 1970	Baltimore	WHN
April 11, 1970	Milwaukee	WHN
April 13, 1970	Milwaukee	WHN
April 17, 1970	@ Milwaukee	WHN
April 19, 1970	@ Milwaukee	WHN
April 20, 1970	Milwaukee	WHN
April 24, 1970	Los Angeles	WHN
April 27, 1970	Los Angeles	WHN
April 29, 1970	@ Los Angeles	WHN
May 1, 1970	@ Los Angeles	WHN
May 4, 1970	Los Angeles	WHN
May 6, 1970	@ Los Angeles	WHN
May 8, 1970	Los Angeles	WHN

Some New York Knicks radio games never aired on WHN because of broadcast conflict with the New York Rangers (NHL).

=== National radio ===
Date	Opponent	Network	Play-by-play	Color analyst
April 24, 1970	Los Angeles	Mutual	Bob Wolff	
April 27, 1970	Los Angeles	Mutual	Bob Wolff	
April 29, 1970	@ Los Angeles	Mutual	Bob Wolff	
May 1, 1970	@ Los Angeles	Mutual	Bob Wolff	
May 4, 1970	Los Angeles	Mutual	Bob Wolff	
May 6, 1970	@ Los Angeles	Mutual	Bob Wolff	
May 8, 1970	Los Angeles	Mutual	Bob Wolff	

=== Public address announcer ===
Madison Square Garden PA announcer
John Condon

== Transactions ==
Transactions listed are from July 1, 1969, to June 30, 1970.

=== 1970 NBA expansion draft ===
May 11, 1970	To Buffalo Braves; Bill Hosket; Don May To Cleveland Cavaliers; John Warren

=== Trades ===
June 20, 1970	To Buffalo Braves; Nate Bowman; Mike Silliman for cash

== Awards and records ==
Player/Coach	Award
Willis Reed	NBA Most Valuable Player Award
Willis Reed	NBA Finals Most Valuable Player Award
Willis Reed	All-NBA First Team
Willis Reed	NBA All-Defensive First Team
Walt Frazier	All-NBA First Team
Walt Frazier	NBA All-Defensive First Team
Dave DeBusschere	NBA All-Defensive First Team
Red Holzman	NBA Coach of the Year Award

== 20th NBA All-Star Game ==
New York Knicks NBA All-Star representatives at the 1970 NBA All-Star Game in Philadelphia, Pennsylvania at The Spectrum.

Player	Team	Position	Minutes	Points	Field goals	FGA	Free throws	FTA	Rebounds	Assists	Personal fouls
Dave DeBusschere	(Eastern Conference All-Stars)	F	14	10	5	10	0	0	7	2	1
Walt Frazier	(Eastern Conference All-Stars)	G, Starter	24	7	3	7	1	2	3	4	2
Willis Reed; MVP	(Eastern Conference All-Stars)	C, Starter	30	21	9	18	3	3	11	0	6

Coach	Team
Red Holzman	(Eastern Conference All-Stars) Head Coach

== NBA finals ==
Without question, the defining moment in the series occurred in Game 7, where an injured Reed limped onto the court right before the start of the game.

On a re-creation of that moment, Marv Albert described it: "Here comes Willis! The crowd is going wild! Willis passes the scorers table, he grabs a basketball. The Lakers have stopped (shooting), the Lakers are watching Willis!"

He scored the game's first two baskets and proceeded not to score for the remainder of the game. Contrary to popular lore, he did not sit out after his first two baskets, but remained on the floor for 27 minutes. Despite his lack of scoring after his first four points, Reed's heroics inspired the team, and they won the game by a score of 113–99. The entire starting line up for the 69–70 Knicks had their jerseys retired by the New York Knicks. The jerseys of Walt Frazier (#10), Willis Reed (#19), Dave DeBusschere (#22), Bill Bradley (#24), and Dick Barnett (#12) all hang from the rafters at Madison Square Garden. Reed walking on to the court was voted the greatest moment in Madison Square Garden history.

Game	Date	Result	Site	Series
Game 1	April 24 (Fri.)	New York Knicks 124, Los Angeles Lakers 112	@ New York	Knicks lead, 1 game to 0
Game 2	April 27 (Mon.)	Los Angeles Lakes 105, New York Knicks 103	@ New York	Series tied, 1 game each
Game 3	April 29 (Wed.)	New York Knicks 111, Los Angeles Lakers 108	@ Los Angeles	Knicks lead, 2 games to 1
Game 4	May 1 (Fri.)	Los Angeles Lakers 121, New York Knicks 105	@ Los Angeles	Series tied, 2 games each
Game 5	May 4 (Mon.)	New York Knicks 107, Los Angeles Lakers 100	@ New York	Knicks lead, 3 games to 2
Game 6	May 6 (Wed.)	Los Angeles Lakers 135, New York Knicks 113	@ Los Angeles	Series tied, 3 games each
Game 7	May 8 (Fri.)	New York Knicks 113, Los Angeles Lakers 99	@ New York	Knicks win, 4 games to 3

Knicks win series 4–3
