= 1969–70 Boston Celtics season =

NBA Basketball season

- Head coach: Tom Heinsohn
- General manager: Red Auerbach
- Arena: Boston Garden

Results
- Record: 34–48 (.415)
- Place: Division: 6th (Eastern)
- Playoff finish: Did not qualify
- Stats at Basketball Reference

The 1969–70 Boston Celtics season was the 24th season for the franchise of in the National Basketball Association (NBA). This was the first time the Celtics had missed the playoffs since the 1949–50 season, ending a 19-year playoff streak. This was also the first season without Hall of Famer Bill Russell, who retired following the 1968–69 season after winning his 11th championship.

This was the first team and last until 1998–99 Chicago Bulls to miss the playoffs after winning a championship the previous year.

== Offseason ==
=== NBA draft ===
Round	Pick	Player	Position	Nationality	School/Club team
1	9	Jo Jo White	Guard	United States	Kansas
4	52	Steve Kuberski	Forward / Center	United States	Bradley
5	66	George Thompson	Guard	United States	Marquette

== Roster ==
Boston Celtics roster
Players

Pos.	No.	Player	Height	Weight	DOB	From
C	28	Jim Barnes	6 ft 8 in (2.03 m)	210 lb (95 kg)		UTEP
PG	7	Em Bryant	6 ft 1 in (1.85 m)	175 lb (79 kg)		DePaul
SG	12	Don Chaney	6 ft 5 in (1.96 m)	210 lb (95 kg)		Houston
C	29	Henry Finkel	7 ft 0 in (2.13 m)	240 lb (109 kg)		Dayton
G/F	17	John Havlicek	6 ft 5 in (1.96 m)	203 lb (92 kg)		Ohio State
SF	18	Bailey Howell	6 ft 7 in (2.01 m)	210 lb (95 kg)		Mississippi State
F/C	11	Steve Kuberski	6 ft 8 in (2.03 m)	215 lb (98 kg)		Bradley
F	19	Don Nelson	6 ft 6 in (1.98 m)	210 lb (95 kg)		Iowa
SF	16	Satch Sanders	6 ft 6 in (1.98 m)	210 lb (95 kg)		NYU
C/G	20	Larry Siegfried	6 ft 3 in (1.91 m)	190 lb (86 kg)		Ohio State
G	10	Jo Jo White	6 ft 3 in (1.91 m)	190 lb (86 kg)		Kansas

Coaches
Head coach
- Tom Heinsohn

Legend
- (DP) Unsigned draft pick
- (FA) Free agent
- (S) Suspended
- Injured

== Regular season ==
Eastern Division	W	L	PCT	GB
x-New York Knicks	60	22	.732	–
x-Milwaukee Bucks	56	26	.683	4
x-Baltimore Bullets	50	32	.610	10
x-Philadelphia 76ers	42	40	.512	18
Cincinnati Royals	36	46	.439	24
Boston Celtics	34	48	.415	26
Detroit Pistons	31	51	.378	29

x = clinched playoff spot

=== Game log ===
1969–70 game log
#	Date	Opponent	Score	High points	Record
1	October 17	Cincinnati	110–108	Larry Siegfried (22)	0–1
2	October 18	@ Baltimore	117–124	John Havlicek (24)	0–2
3	October 21	@ Detroit	97–98	Em Bryant (17)	0–3
4	October 24	Atlanta	122–110	Don Nelson (22)	0–4
5	October 28	@ Milwaukee	120–107	John Havlicek (25)	1–4
6	October 31	San Diego	113–118	John Havlicek (33)	2–4
7	November 1	@ Philadelphia	131–123	Henry Finkel (22)	3–4
8	November 5	@ Atlanta	121–128	Em Bryant (39)	3–5
9	November 7	San Francisco	111–110	John Havlicek (31)	3–6
10	November 8	@ Chicago	87–103	Em Bryant (18)	3–7
11	November 11	Milwaukee	129–118	John Havlicek (24)	3–8
12	November 12	@ Cincinnati	107–116	Don Nelson (23)	3–9
13	November 14	Baltimore	109–108	John Havlicek (31)	3–10
14	November 15	@ New York	98–113	Henry Finkel (20)	3–11
15	November 18	N Phoenix	119–120 (OT)	John Havlicek (41)	4–11
16	November 19	Chicago	106–122	John Havlicek (21)	5–11
17	November 21	@ San Francisco	115–118	John Havlicek (25)	5–12
18	November 22	@ San Diego	116–125	John Havlicek (29)	5–13
19	November 23	@ Seattle	125–116	Larry Siegfried (26)	6–13
20	November 26	Philadelphia	135–114	Don Nelson (20)	6–14
21	November 28	Atlanta	130–105	John Havlicek (22)	6–15
22	November 29	@ Baltimore	121–106	Henry Finkel (23)	7–15
23	December 3	Baltimore	105–113	Larry Siegfried (31)	8–15
24	December 5	Philadelphia	105–104	Henry Finkel (26)	8–16
25	December 6	@ Chicago	114–116 (OT)	Larry Siegfried (33)	8–17
26	December 10	Los Angeles	99–111	Em Bryant (25)	9–17
27	December 12	San Diego	104–107	John Havlicek (33)	10–17
28	December 16	N Detroit	98–117	Larry Siegfried (27)	11–17
29	December 17	Milwaukee	124–106	Henry Finkel (23)	11–18
30	December 19	@ Milwaukee	111–115	Larry Siegfried (24)	11–19
31	December 20	@ Atlanta	106–122	John Havlicek (31)	11–20
32	December 23	Chicago	112–117	Havlicek, Howell (26)	12–20
33	December 25	@ Phoenix	116–127	Don Nelson (21)	12–21
34	December 26	@ Seattle	122–112	John Havlicek (42)	13–21
35	December 27	@ San Diego	111–110	Larry Siegfried (29)	14–21
36	December 28	@ Los Angeles	99–109	John Havlicek (30)	14–22
37	December 31	Detroit	121–124	John Havlicek (30)	15–22
38	January 2	@ Detroit	110–92	John Havlicek (23)	16–22
39	January 3	@ New York	111–104	John Havlicek (31)	17–22
40	January 4	@ Philadelphia	120–130	Don Nelson (31)	17–23
41	January 7	Atlanta	112–106	John Havlicek (28)	17–24
42	January 9	Baltimore	142–130	Larry Siegfried (25)	17–25
43	January 10	@ Milwaukee	109–124	Johnson, White (18)	17–26
44	January 13	N Seattle	102–111	Larry Siegfried (22)	18–26
45	January 14	Detroit	118–123	Henry Finkel (27)	19–26
46	January 16	Los Angeles	108–103	Larry Siegfried (24)	19–27
47	January 18	New York	102–109	John Havlicek (30)	20–27
48	January 22	@ Cincinnati	104–111	Jo Jo White (23)	20–28
49	January 23	Detroit	109–105 (OT)	Don Nelson (24)	20–29
50	January 25	New York	102–96	John Havlicek (24)	20–30
51	January 27	@ New York	100–133	John Havlicek (19)	20–31
52	January 28	Philadelphia	100–112	Jo Jo White (28)	21–31
53	January 30	Cincinnati	103–108	Jo Jo White (22)	22–31
54	January 31	@ Baltimore	117–120	Havlicek, White (22)	22–32
55	February 1	San Francisco	123–105	John Havlicek (17)	22–33
56	February 3	N Chicago	85–93	Jo Jo White (23)	23–33
57	February 6	Seattle	117–127	John Havlicek (39)	24–33
58	February 8	Cincinnati	117–130	Jo Jo White (26)	25–33
59	February 10	Phoenix	122–117	Don Nelson (24)	25–34
60	February 11	@ New York	125–118 (OT)	John Havlicek (30)	26–34
61	February 14	@ Milwaukee	117–127	John Havlicek (38)	26–35
62	February 15	@ Atlanta	125–146	John Havlicek (31)	26–36
63	February 16	N San Francisco	114–117	Don Nelson (25)	27–36
64	February 18	@ Phoenix	116–113	John Havlicek (30)	28–36
65	February 20	@ Seattle	127–125	Don Nelson (36)	29–36
66	February 21	@ San Francisco	111–116	John Havlicek (36)	29–37
67	February 22	@ Los Angeles	96–108	John Havlicek (26)	29–38
68	February 25	San Diego	124–147	Don Nelson (40)	30–38
69	February 27	Phoenix	134–125	Nelson, White (23)	30–39
70	March 1	Los Angeles	120–114	Don Nelson (30)	30–40
71	March 4	San Francisco	110–115	John Havlicek (31)	31–40
72	March 6	@ Philadelphia	134–150	Jo Jo White (26)	31–41
73	March 8	Milwaukee	138–134	John Havlicek (43)	31–42
74	March 10	@ Detroit	112–115	Don Chaney (25)	31–43
75	March 11	@ Cincinnati	144–127	Howell, Siegfried (23)	32–43
76	March 13	@ Chicago	113–134	Larry Siegfried (20)	32–44
77	March 15	Baltimore	130–127	John Havlicek (37)	32–45
78	March 17	@ San Diego	117–125	John Havlicek (30)	32–46
79	March 18	@ Los Angeles	137–122	Larry Siegfried (26)	33–46
80	March 19	@ Phoenix	123–127	John Havlicek (29)	33–47
81	March 20	Seattle	123–119	Jo Jo White (22)	33–48
82	March 22	New York	112–115	Havlicek, White (22)	34–48

== Player statistics ==
Legend
GP	Games played	GS	Games started	MPG	Minutes per game
FG%	Field-goal percentage	3P%	3-point field-goal percentage	FT%	Free-throw percentage
RPG	Rebounds per game	APG	Assists per game	SPG	Steals per game
BPG	Blocks per game	PPG	Points per game

== Awards and records ==
- John Havlicek, All-NBA Second Team
- John Havlicek, NBA All-Defensive Second Team
- Jo Jo White, NBA All-Rookie Team 1st Team
