= Wally Anderzunas =

American basketball player (1946–1989)

Personal information
- Born: January 11, 1946 Omaha, Nebraska, U.S.
- Died: May 28, 1989 (aged 43)
- Listed height: 6 ft 7 in (2.01 m)
- Listed weight: 220 lb (100 kg)

Career information
- High school: Creighton Preparatory (Omaha, Nebraska)
- College: Creighton (1966–1969)
- NBA draft: 1969: 2nd round, 25th overall pick
- Drafted by: Atlanta Hawks
- Playing career: 1969–1970
- Position: Power forward / center
- Number: 21

Career history
- 1969–1970: Cincinnati Royals
- Stats at NBA.com
- Stats at Basketball Reference

Walter Charles "Wally" Anderzunas (January 11, 1946 – May 28, 1989) was an American basketball player.

He attended high school in Omaha, Nebraska and collegiately for the Creighton University.

He was selected by the Detroit Pistons in the sixth round (70th overall pick) of the 1968 NBA draft and by the Atlanta Hawks in the second round (25th overall pick) of the 1969 NBA draft. He was traded along with the NBA draft rights to Lonnie Wright from the Hawks to the Cincinnati Royals which had also acquired Norm Van Lier from the Chicago Bulls in the three-team trade on 12 October 1969. He played in 44 games with the Royals during the 1969–70 NBA season.

== Career statistics ==
Legend
| GP | Games played | GS | Games started | MPG | Minutes per game |
| FG% | Field goal percentage | 3P% | 3-point field goal percentage | FT% | Free throw percentage |
| RPG | Rebounds per game | APG | Assists per game | SPG | Steals per game |
| BPG | Blocks per game | PPG | Points per game | **Bold** | Career high |

=== NBA ===
==== Regular season ====
| Year | Team | GP | MPG | FG% | FT% | RPG | APG | PPG |
|---|---|---|---|---|---|---|---|---|
| 1969–70 | Cincinnati | 44 | 8.4 | .392 | .630 | 1.9 | .2 | 3.6 |
