= Jim Washington =

American basketball player (born 1943)

Personal information
- Born: July 1, 1943 (age 83) Philadelphia, Pennsylvania, U.S.
- Listed height: 6 ft 7 in (2.01 m)
- Listed weight: 210 lb (95 kg)

Career information
- High school: West Philadelphia Catholic (Philadelphia, Pennsylvania)
- College: Villanova (1962–1965)
- NBA draft: 1965: 1st round, 6th overall pick
- Drafted by: St. Louis Hawks
- Playing career: 1965–1975
- Position: Power forward
- Number: 25, 7, 12

Career history
- 1965–1966: St. Louis Hawks
- 1966–1969: Chicago Bulls
- 1969: Sunbury Mercuries
- 1969–1971: Philadelphia 76ers
- 1971–1975: Atlanta Hawks
- 1975: Buffalo Braves

Career highlights
- No. 50 retired by Villanova Wildcats; Robert V. Geasey Trophy winner (1965)

Career NBA statistics
- Points: 8,168 (10.6 ppg)
- Rebounds: 6,637 (8.6 rpg)
- Assists: 1,105 (1.4 apg)
- Stats at NBA.com
- Stats at Basketball Reference

James H. "Jumpin' Jimmy" Washington (born July 1, 1943) is an American former professional basketball player. A 6'6" forward born in Philadelphia and from Villanova University, he was selected by the St. Louis Hawks with the 6th pick of the 1965 NBA draft. After one year with the Hawks, he joined the Chicago Bulls, where he became a fan favorite as the first Bull to average more than ten rebounds per game.

In 1967–1968, he averaged 12.5 points and 10.1 rebounds per game. During the 1968 NBA playoffs, he averaged postseason career-highs of 17.2 points and 15 rebounds as the Bulls lost in the first round to the Los Angeles Lakers. The following season, Washington averaged 14 points and 10.6 rebounds. Washington would also play for the Philadelphia 76ers, Atlanta Hawks (a later incarnation of the St. Louis Hawks), and the Buffalo Braves and retired with 6,637 career rebounds.

== Career statistics ==
Legend
GP	Games played	GS	Games started	MPG	Minutes per game
FG%	Field goal percentage	3P%	3-point field goal percentage	FT%	Free throw percentage
RPG	Rebounds per game	APG	Assists per game	SPG	Steals per game
BPG	Blocks per game	PPG	Points per game	**Bold**	Career high
*	Led the league

=== NBA ===
==== Regular season ====
Year	Team	GP	GS	MPG	FG%	FT%	RPG	APG	STL	BLK	PPG
1965–66	St. Louis	65		17.0	.402	.567	5.4	.7			5.9
1966–67	Chicago	77		19.2	.417	.553	6.1	.7			7.7
1967–68	Chicago	82		30.8	.457	.682	10.1	1.4			12.5
1968–69	Chicago	80		33.8	.430	.677	10.6	1.3			**14.0**
1969–70	Philadelphia	79		31.1	.476	.762	9.6	1.2			13.4
1970–71	Philadelphia	78	**70**	32.1	.476	.762	9.6	1.2			13.4
1971–72	Philadelphia	**17***	11	32.1	.436	**.821**	7.9	1.5			11.2
1971–72	Atlanta	**67***		36.1	.446	.785	9.0	1.8			12.7
1972–73	Atlanta	75		**37.8**	.432	.728	**10.7**	**2.3**			10.4
1973–74	Atlanta	73		34.5	**.485**	.684	10.1	2.1	**.7**	**1.0**	10.0
1974–75	Atlanta	38		23.8	.440	.745	5.1	1.8	.6	.3	7.1
1974–75	Buffalo	42		16.0	.475	.553	4.7	1.0	.3	.3	4.2
1975–76	Buffalo	1		7.0	.000	–	1.0	1.0	.0	.0	.0
Career		774	81	29.3	.449	.705	8.6	1.4	.5	.6	10.6

==== Playoffs ====
Year	Team	GP	MPG	FG%	FT%	RPG	APG	STL	BLK	PPG
1966	St. Louis	4	1.5	**.500**	–	.8	.0			1.0
1967	Chicago	3	12.7	.455	**.800**	3.3	.7			8.0
1968	Chicago	5	**41.0**	.447	.667	**15.0**	2.0			**17.2**
1970	Philadelphia	5	33.4	.439	.565	9.8	1.8			12.6
1971	Philadelphia	**7**	30.9	.443	.722	6.9	1.4			11.4
1972	Atlanta	6	34.8	.483	.563	8.0	1.7			10.8
1973	Atlanta	6	37.7	.396	.294	10.0	**2.3**			7.2
1974	Buffalo	6	6.5	.400	–	1.2	.5	.0	.0	.7
Career		42	26.3	.444	.598	7.1	1.4	.0	.0	8.8
