= 1969–70 Detroit Pistons season =

NBA team season

- Head coach: Bill Van Breda Kolff
- General manager: Ed Coil
- Owner: Fred Zollner
- Arena: Cobo Arena

Results
- Record: 31–51 (.378)
- Place: Division: 7th (Eastern)
- Playoff finish: Did not qualify
- Stats at Basketball Reference

The 1969–70 Detroit Pistons season was the Detroit Pistons' 22nd season in the NBA and 13th season in the city of Detroit. The team played at Cobo Arena in Detroit.

It was a challenging season for Detroit, which started in the pre-season when rising star Dave Bing signed a future contract with the Washington Caps of the rival American Basketball Association. Bing would re-sign with the Pistons the following season when the Washington ABA team moved to Virginia. The team also changed coaches, bringing in Butch Van Breda Kolff, who had been forced out from the Los Angeles Lakers after feuding with star Wilt Chamberlain. The Pistons would finish the season with a 31-51 (.378) record, 7th in the NBA Eastern Division, the 14th straight losing season for the franchise. The Pistons were led on the season by Bing (22.9 ppg, 6.0 apg) and guard Jimmy Walker (20.8 ppg, NBA All-Star).

== Roster ==
Detroit Pistons roster
Players

Pos.	No.	Player	Height	Weight	DOB	From
G	21	Dave Bing	6 ft 3 in (1.91 m)	180 lb (82 kg)		Syracuse
SF	43	Terry Dischinger	6 ft 7 in (2.01 m)	189 lb (86 kg)		Purdue
F	31	Bill Hewitt	6 ft 5 in (1.96 m)	210 lb (95 kg)		USC
G	30	Howard Komives	6 ft 1 in (1.85 m)	185 lb (84 kg)		Bowling Green
G	26	Paul Long	6 ft 2 in (1.88 m)	180 lb (82 kg)		Wake Forest
SF	18	McCoy McLemore	6 ft 7 in (2.01 m)	230 lb (104 kg)		Drake
F	23	Steve Mix	6 ft 7 in (2.01 m)	215 lb (98 kg)		Toledo
F/C	20	Otto Moore	6 ft 11 in (2.11 m)	205 lb (93 kg)		Texas–Pan American
F/C	51	Erwin Mueller	6 ft 8 in (2.03 m)	230 lb (104 kg)		San Francisco
F	14	Bob Quick	6 ft 5 in (1.96 m)	215 lb (98 kg)		Xavier
G	10	George Reynolds	6 ft 4 in (1.93 m)	195 lb (88 kg)		Houston
F	24	Jimmy Walker	6 ft 3 in (1.91 m)	195 lb (88 kg)		Providence

Coaches
Head coach
- Bill Van Breda Kolff

Legend
- (DP) Unsigned draft pick
- (FA) Free agent
- (S) Suspended
- Injured

== Regular season ==
=== Season standings ===
Eastern Division	W	L	PCT	GB
x-New York Knicks	60	22	.732	–
x-Milwaukee Bucks	56	26	.683	4
x-Baltimore Bullets	50	32	.610	10
x-Philadelphia 76ers	42	40	.512	18
Cincinnati Royals	36	46	.439	24
Boston Celtics	34	48	.415	26
Detroit Pistons	31	51	.378	29

x – clinched playoff spot

=== Game log ===
1969–70 game log
#	Date	Opponent	Score	High points	Record
1	October 18	@ Milwaukee	110–119	Walt Bellamy (25)	0–1
2	October 21	Boston	97–98	Bing, Walker (16)	1–1
3	October 24	New York	116–92	Jimmy Walker (21)	1–2
4	October 25	@ Atlanta	125–104	Walt Bellamy (26)	2–2
5	October 28	Baltimore	125–110	Dave Bing (24)	2–3
6	October 30	Milwaukee	102–81	Dave Bing (21)	2–4
7	November 1	San Diego	113–130	Happy Hairston (21)	3–4
8	November 4	Seattle	116–102	Dave Bing (28)	3–5
9	November 7	Philadelphia	128–134 (2OT)	Jimmy Walker (29)	4–5
10	November 8	@ Milwaukee	96–100	Jimmy Walker (17)	4–6
11	November 9	@ Phoenix	129–140	Eddie Miles (22)	4–7
12	November 11	@ Los Angeles	110–102	Eddie Miles (24)	5–7
13	November 12	@ San Diego	119–132	Terry Dischinger (29)	5–8
14	November 13	@ Seattle	113–117	Jimmy Walker (16)	5–9
15	November 15	@ Cincinnati	105–104	Jimmy Walker (28)	6–9
16	November 18	Los Angeles	125–114 (OT)	Walt Bellamy (32)	6–10
17	November 21	Atlanta	118–106	Howard Komives (20)	6–11
18	November 25	N Chicago	104–103	Eddie Miles (23)	7–11
19	November 26	Chicago	129–109	Hairston, Miles (22)	7–12
20	November 28	@ Philadelphia	91–110	Jimmy Walker (19)	7–13
21	November 29	@ New York	110–98	Jimmy Walker (27)	8–13
22	December 2	@ San Francisco	109–116	Jimmy Walker (29)	8–14
23	December 3	@ San Francisco	106–102	Eddie Miles (29)	9–14
24	December 5	@ Los Angeles	109–128	Dischinger, Komives, Miles, Walker (22)	9–15
25	December 7	@ Phoenix	118–113	Jimmy Walker (30)	10–15
26	December 8	@ San Diego	111–102	Jimmy Walker (32)	11–15
27	December 9	@ Seattle	104–109	Jimmy Walker (33)	11–16
28	December 11	Cincinnati	116–119 (OT)	Jimmy Walker (30)	12–16
29	December 12	@ Philadelphia	111–125	Bing, Long (16)	12–17
30	December 13	San Francisco	104–97	Jimmy Walker (24)	12–18
31	December 16	N Boston	98–117	Jimmy Walker (28)	12–19
32	December 17	San Diego	114–107	Jimmy Walker (21)	12–20
33	December 19	@ Baltimore	105–108	Jimmy Walker (25)	12–21
34	December 20	Phoenix	113–114	Jimmy Walker (21)	13–21
35	December 25	@ New York	111–112	Jimmy Walker (32)	13–22
36	December 26	Milwaukee	114–101	Bellamy, Walker (26)	13–23
37	December 29	Cincinnati	110–103	Jimmy Walker (23)	13–24
38	December 31	@ Boston	121–124	Jimmy Walker (27)	13–25
39	January 2	Boston	110–92	Dave Bing (26)	13–26
40	January 3	@ Phoenix	109–114	Dave Bing (21)	13–27
41	January 4	N Seattle	110–116	Jimmy Walker (29)	14–27
42	January 5	@ San Francisco	102–118	Jimmy Walker (27)	14–28
43	January 7	N Baltimore	116–121	Jimmy Walker (31)	14–29
44	January 10	Seattle	128–129	Jimmy Walker (29)	15–29
45	January 12	N Atlanta	113–100	Dave Bing (22)	16–29
46	January 13	San Francisco	102–115	Jimmy Walker (23)	17–29
47	January 14	@ Boston	118–123	Dave Bing (33)	17–30
48	January 16	New York	104–102	Dave Bing (29)	17–31
49	January 18	Los Angeles	100–106	Dave Bing (27)	18–31
50	January 22	N Baltimore	115–119	Dave Bing (37)	18–32
51	January 23	@ Boston	109–105 (OT)	Jimmy Walker (27)	19–32
52	January 24	Chicago	122–128	Dave Bing (31)	20–32
53	January 25	@ Chicago	111–120	Jimmy Walker (22)	20–33
54	January 29	@ New York	106–127	Walt Bellamy (22)	20–34
55	January 30	Baltimore	117–129	Dave Bing (28)	21–34
56	January 31	@ Cincinnati	115–117	Dave Bing (25)	21–35
57	February 1	New York	117–111	Jimmy Walker (32)	21–36
58	February 2	N Atlanta	121–125	Dave Bing (25)	21–37
59	February 4	Los Angeles	109–125	Dave Bing (40)	22–37
60	February 6	@ Baltimore	148–153 (2OT)	Dave Bing (44)	22–38
61	February 7	Seattle	109–113	Dave Bing (32)	23–38
62	February 10	Cincinnati	117–115	Jimmy Walker (26)	23–39
63	February 11	N Cincinnati	113–124	Jimmy Walker (27)	23–40
64	February 13	Phoenix	120–132	Terry Dischinger (27)	24–40
65	February 15	Chicago	119–126	Dave Bing (38)	25–40
66	February 19	N Philadelphia	133–114	Dave Bing (25)	25–41
67	February 20	@ Baltimore	122–119	Jimmy Walker (31)	26–41
68	February 21	Philadelphia	112–110	Bing, Moore (24)	26–42
69	February 22	@ Atlanta	116–114	Jimmy Walker (24)	27–42
70	February 24	Milwaukee	111–136	Jimmy Walker (30)	28–42
71	February 25	@ Philadelphia	105–122	Dave Bing (32)	28–43
72	February 26	Phoenix	131–123	Dave Bing (32)	28–44
73	February 27	@ Milwaukee	113–131	Jimmy Walker (21)	28–45
74	March 1	San Francisco	99–116	Dave Bing (31)	29–45
75	March 6	Milwaukee	121–118	Dave Bing (42)	29–46
76	March 7	San Diego	126–134	Dave Bing (32)	30–46
77	March 10	Boston	112–115	Dave Bing (26)	31–46
78	March 14	@ Chicago	96–111	Jimmy Walker (27)	31–47
79	March 17	New York	122–106	Jimmy Walker (32)	31–48
80	March 19	@ San Diego	118–132	Dave Bing (25)	31–49
81	March 20	@ Los Angeles	111–117	Dave Bing (33)	31–50
82	March 22	Atlanta	130–126	Dave Bing (29)	31–51
