= 1969–70 Milwaukee Bucks season =

NBA professional basketball team season

- Head coach: Larry Costello
- General manager: John E. Erickson
- Owners: Milwaukee Professional Sports and Services, Inc. (Milwaukee Pro)
- Arena: Milwaukee Arena

Results
- Record: 56–26 (.683)
- Place: Division: 2nd (Eastern)
- Playoff finish: Division finals (lost to Knicks 1–4)
- Stats at Basketball Reference

The 1969–70 Milwaukee Bucks season was the second season for the Milwaukee Bucks. Led by the heralded rookie center Lew Alcindor, they finished with a 56–26 record, enough for second place in the Eastern Division. After beating the Philadelphia 76ers 4–1 in the Eastern semifinals, they lost to the eventual champions New York Knicks in five games.

== Draft picks ==
After a 27–55 record in their inaugural NBA season, the Bucks won a coin toss over the Phoenix Suns to give them the right to select first overall in the 1969 NBA draft. Their designated selection had long been a foregone conclusion: UCLA Bruins center Lew Alcindor. However, Alcindor was also selected first overall by the New York Nets in the competing American Basketball Association's entry draft, which triggered a bidding war for Alcindor's services. He eventually opted for the Bucks' five-year $1.4 million offer over a much more lucrative $3.2 million offer from the Nets, preferring the established NBA over a new and struggling ABA.

Round	Pick	Player	Position	Nationality	College
1	1	Lew Alcindor	C	United States	UCLA
2	17	Bob Greacen	F	United States	Rutgers
3	31	Skeeter Swift	G	United States	East Tennessee State
4	45	Bob Dandridge	F	United States	Norfolk State
5	59	Kenny Heitz	G	United States	UCLA
6	73	John Arthurs	G	United States	Tulane
7	87	Billy Keller	G	United States	Purdue
8	101	John Schell	F	United States	Wisconsin

== Roster ==
1969–70 Milwaukee Bucks roster
Players

Pos.	No.	Player	Height	Weight	DOB	From
C	33	Lew Alcindor	7 ft 2 in (2.18 m)	225 lb (102 kg)	1947–04–16	UCLA
F	50	Len Chappell	6 ft 8 in (2.03 m)	240 lb (109 kg)	1941–01–31	Wake Forest
SG	16	Freddie Crawford	6 ft 4 in (1.93 m)	189 lb (86 kg)	1941–12–23	St. Bonaventure
C	19	Dick Cunningham	6 ft 10 in (2.08 m)	245 lb (111 kg)	1946–07–11	Murray State
SF	10	Bob Dandridge	6 ft 6 in (1.98 m)	195 lb (88 kg)	1947–11–15	Norfolk State
F	18	Bob Greacen	6 ft 7 in (2.01 m)	206 lb (93 kg)	1947–09–15	Rutgers
G	14	Jon McGlocklin	6 ft 5 in (1.96 m)	205 lb (93 kg)	1943–06–10	Indiana
G	21	Flynn Robinson	6 ft 1 in (1.85 m)	185 lb (84 kg)	1941–04–28	Wyoming
G	5	Guy Rodgers	6 ft 0 in (1.83 m)	185 lb (84 kg)	1935–09–31	Temple
C	35	Don Smith	6 ft 9 in (2.06 m)	235 lb (107 kg)	1946–04–07	Iowa State
F	4	Greg Smith	6 ft 5 in (1.96 m)	195 lb (88 kg)	1947–01–28	Western Kentucky
G	3	Sam Williams	6 ft 3 in (1.91 m)	180 lb (82 kg)	1945–01–22	Iowa

Coaches
Head coach
- Larry Costello
Assistant(s)
- Tom Nissalke

Legend
- (DP) Unsigned draft pick
- (FA) Free agent
- (S) Suspended
- Injured

== Regular season ==
=== Season standings ===
Eastern Division	W	L	PCT	GB
x-New York Knicks	60	22	.732	–
x-Milwaukee Bucks	56	26	.683	4
x-Baltimore Bullets	50	32	.610	10
x-Philadelphia 76ers	42	40	.512	18
Cincinnati Royals	36	46	.439	24
Boston Celtics	34	48	.415	26
Detroit Pistons	31	51	.378	29

=== Game log ===
1969–70 game log
Total: 56–26 (home: 0–0; road: 0–0; neutral: 0–0)
October: 6–3 (home: 2–1; road: 4–2)

Game	Date	Team	Score	High points	High rebounds	High assists	Location Attendance	Record
1	October 18, 1969	Detroit	W 119–110	Lew Alcindor (29)	Lew Alcindor (12)	Alcindor, McGlocklin, Rodgers (6)	Milwaukee Arena	1–0
2	October 19, 1969	Seattle	W 130–106	Flynn Robinson (22)	Zaid Abdul-Aziz (14)	Guy Rodgers (10)	Milwaukee Arena	2–0
3	October 22, 1969	@ San Diego	W 115–102	Lew Alcindor (36)	Lew Alcindor (19)	Jon McGlocklin (5)	San Diego Arena	3–0
4	October 24, 1969	@ Los Angeles	L 112–123	Flynn Robinson (33)	Lew Alcindor (20)	Flynn Robinson (7)	The Forum	3–1
5	October 25, 1969	@ San Francisco	L 104–118	Guy Rodgers (20)	Zaid Abdul-Aziz (11)	John Arthurs (5)	San Francisco Civic Auditorium	3–2
6	October 26, 1969	@ Phoenix	W 119–99	Lew Alcindor (28)	Alcindor, Smith (12)	Guy Rodgers (15)	Arizona Veterans Memorial Coliseum	4–2
7	October 28, 1969	Boston	L 107–120	Lew Alcindor (43)	Greg Smith (15)	Flynn Robinson (6)	Milwaukee Arena	4–3
8	October 30, 1969	@ Detroit	W 102–81	Flynn Robinson (25)	Greg Smith (20)	Guy Rodgers (10)	Cobo Arena	5–3
9	October 31, 1969	@ Philadelphia	W 129–125	McGlocklin, Chapell (28)	Lew Alcindor (18)	Lew Alcindor (9)	The Spectrum	6–3

November: 0–0 (home: 0–0; road: 0–0)

Game	Date	Team	Score	High points	High rebounds	High assists	Location Attendance	Record

December: 0–0 (home: 0–0; road: 0–0)

Game	Date	Team	Score	High points	High rebounds	High assists	Location Attendance	Record

January: 0–0 (home: 0–0; road: 0–0)

Game	Date	Team	Score	High points	High rebounds	High assists	Location Attendance	Record

February: 0–0 (home: 0–0; road: 0–0)

Game	Date	Team	Score	High points	High rebounds	High assists	Location Attendance	Record

March: 0–0 (home: 0–0; road: 0–0)

Game	Date	Team	Score	High points	High rebounds	High assists	Location Attendance	Record

1969–70 schedule

== Playoffs ==
1970 playoff game log
Division Semifinals: 4–1 (home: 2–1; road: 2–0)

Game	Date	Team	Score	High points	High rebounds	High assists	Location Attendance	Series
1	March 25	Philadelphia	W 125–118	Lew Alcindor (36)	Lew Alcindor (20)	Bob Dandridge (6)	University of Wisconsin Field House; 9,686	1–0
2	March 27	Philadelphia	L 105–112	Lew Alcindor (33)	Bob Dandridge (12)	Bob Dandridge (7)	University of Wisconsin Field House; 9,686	1–1
3	March 30	@ Philadelphia	W 156–120	Lew Alcindor (33)	Lew Alcindor (17)	Flynn Robinson (14)	Spectrum; 15,244	2–1
4	April 1	@ Philadelphia	W 118–111	Lew Alcindor (33)	Greg Smith (19)	Bob Dandridge (7)	Spectrum; 14,206	3–1
5	April 3	Philadelphia	W 115–106	Lew Alcindor (46)	Lew Alcindor (25)	Bob Dandridge (8)	University of Wisconsin Field House; 12,868	4–1

Division Finals: 1–4 (home: 1–1; road: 0–3)

Game	Date	Team	Score	High points	High rebounds	High assists	Location Attendance	Series
1	April 11	@ New York	L 102–110	Lew Alcindor (35)	Lew Alcindor (15)	Lew Alcindor (5)	Madison Square Garden; 19,500	0–1
2	April 13	@ New York	L 111–112	Lew Alcindor (38)	Lew Alcindor (23)	Lew Alcindor (11)	Madison Square Garden; 19,500	0–2
3	April 17	New York	W 101–96	Lew Alcindor (33)	Lew Alcindor (31)	Bob Dandridge (8)	Milwaukee Arena; 10,746	1–2
4	April 19	New York	L 105–117	Lew Alcindor (38)	Alcindor, Smith (9)	Flynn Robinson (7)	Milwaukee Arena; 10,746	1–3
5	April 20	@ New York	L 96–132	Lew Alcindor (27)	Zaid Abdul-Aziz (12)	Guy Rodgers (6)	Madison Square Garden; 19,500	1–4

1970 schedule

== Player statistics ==
Legend
GP	Games played	GS	Games started	MPG	Minutes per game
FG%	Field-goal percentage	3P%	3-point field-goal percentage	FT%	Free-throw percentage
RPG	Rebounds per game	APG	Assists per game	SPG	Steals per game
BPG	Blocks per game	PPG	Points per game

=== Season ===
Player	GP	MPG	FG%	FT%	RPG	APG	PF	PPG
Lew Alcindor	82	43.1	.518	.653	14.5	4.1	3.5	28.8
Jon McGlocklin	82	36.2	.530	.854	3.1	3.7	2.0	17.6
Flynn Robinson	81	34.1	.477	.898	3.2	5.5	3.1	21.8
Bob Dandridge	81	30.4	.485	.754	7.7	3.6	3.4	13.2
Greg Smith	82	28.9	.511	.718	8.7	1.9	3.7	9.8
Zaid Abdul-Aziz	80	20.5	.434	.643	7.5	0.8	2.1	7.4
Freddie Crawford	77	17.3	.480	.682	2.4	2.9	2.4	7.6
Len Chappell	75	15.1	.465	.640	3.7	0.7	1.7	8.3
Guy Rodgers	64	11.7	.356	.744	1.2	3.3	1.1	3.2
John Arthurs	11	7.8	.343	.733	1.3	1.5	1.4	3.2
Bob Greacen	41	7.1	.404	.643	1.4	0.7	1.2	2.6
Dick Cunningham	60	6.9	.369	.667	2.7	0.5	1.2	2.1
Sam Williams	11	4.0	.458	.455	0.6	0.3	0.5	2.5

=== Playoffs ===
Player	GP	MPG	FG%	FT%	RPG	APG	PF	PPG
Lew Alcindor	10	43.5	.567	.733	16.8	4.1	2.5	35.2
Bob Dandridge	10	39.9	.507	.655	8.7	5.7	3.9	16.3
Jon McGlocklin	10	37.7	.431	.806	3.6	2.1	2.2	14.9
Greg Smith	10	32.9	.500	.591	8.5	2.2	3.4	10.7
Flynn Robinson	10	30.0	.326	.880	2.3	5.0	2.2	12.8
Freddie Crawford	10	20.8	.386	.833	3.5	3.7	2.7	8.8
Len Chappell	9	14.8	.560	.684	2.9	0.6	1.1	7.7
Zaid Abdul-Aziz	7	11.7	.579	.800	3.7	0.6	0.7	4.3
Guy Rodgers	7	9.7	.286	.750	0.6	3.0	1.0	2.4
Bob Greacen	1	8.0	.250	.000	2.0	3.0	0.0	2.0
Sam Williams	2	8.0	.571	.000	2.0	0.5	2.5	4.0
Dick Cunningham	8	5.6	.556	.500	1.5	0.3	0.8	2.6

== Awards and honors ==
- Lew Alcindor, NBA Rookie of the Year
- Lew Alcindor, NBA All-Rookie Team
- Lew Alcindor, NBA All-Star Game Appearance
