= Luther Rackley =

American basketball player (1946-2017)

Personal information
- Born: June 11, 1946 Bainbridge, Georgia, U.S.
- Died: November 19, 2017 (aged 71) Harlem, New York, U.S.
- Listed height: 6 ft 10 in (2.08 m)
- Listed weight: 220 lb (100 kg)

Career information
- High school: Troy (Troy, New York)
- College: Xavier (1966–1969)
- NBA draft: 1969: 3rd round, 37th overall pick
- Drafted by: Cincinnati Royals
- Playing career: 1969–1978
- Position: Center
- Number: 22, 45, 43, 23, 12, 42

Career history
- 1969–1970: Cincinnati Royals
- 1970–1971: Cleveland Cavaliers
- 1971–1972: New York Knicks
- 1972–1973: Memphis Tams
- 1973: Philadelphia 76ers
- 1973–1975: Cherry Hill Rookies
- 1975–1976: Scranton Apollos
- 1977–1978: Wilkes-Barre Barons

Career highlights
- All-EBA First Team (1974)
- Stats at NBA.com
- Stats at Basketball Reference

Luther Rackley Jr. (June 11, 1946 - November 19, 2017) was an American professional basketball player who played six seasons in the National Basketball Association (NBA), and the American Basketball Association (ABA).

== Early life ==
Rackley was born in Bainbridge, Georgia and grew up in Troy, New York, where he attended Troy High School. In his senior season at Troy, Rackley led the team in scoring and rebounding as the Flying Horses went 22–0. The team earned a ranking of No. 1 in the nation from a University of Kentucky scout, and Rackley was named All-American. During his junior and senior seasons, Troy won 38 of 40 games, two Class A league championships and a pair of Section II Class A titles. The entire team was inducted into the Capital District Hall of Fame in 2011.

== College career ==
Rackley played college basketball at Xavier University in Cincinnati, Ohio. As a sophomore starting center, he averaged 15.0 points and 12.6 rebounds per game. He had a season-high 25 points against both the University of Utah and St. Bonaventure University and its All-American center Bob Lanier. Against the University of Detroit, he posted 24 points and 19 rebounds, and he snared 25 rebounds against the University of Dayton.

In his junior season he was limited to seven games due to ineligibility due to his grades, and averaged 9.1 points and 8.4 rebounds per game. As a senior, Rackley came on strong with team-leading 17.5 points, 14.0 rebounds, and a .552 field goal percentage. He had a career-high 29 points in two games.

Rackley earned a bachelor's degree in American Government and Political Science.

He was inducted into the Xavier University Athletic Hall of Fame in 1982.

== Professional career ==
Rackley was selected in the third round (37th overall) of the 1969 NBA draft by the Cincinnati Royals and by the American Basketball Association's Minnesota Pipers. He signed with the NBA's Royals. In his rookie season of 1969–70, he served primarily as the backup to starting center Connie Dierking, playing 66 games and averaging 19 minutes per game, 7.6 points and 5.7 rebounds.

On May 11, 1970, he was drafted by the Cleveland Cavaliers in the NBA expansion draft. In 1970–71 for the Cavs, he averaged just over 19 minutes per game, again averaging 7.6 points along with 5.3 rebounds per game.

In 1971–72, his third season, he played nine games for the Cavaliers, then on November 15, 1971, he was traded to the New York Knicks. He remained a backup center, and for the season averaged 3.6 points and 2.9 rebounds per game.

During the 1972–73 season, he played one game for the Knicks before being waived. He signed with the American Basketball Association Memphis Tams. There, he played in 57 games, averaging 7.3 points and 5.0 rebounds. The Knicks would go on to win the 1973 championship.

On September 28, 1973, he was claimed off waivers by the Philadelphia 76ers. He played nine games before being waived on November 28, 1973.

Rackley played in the Eastern Basketball Association (EBA) for the Cherry Hill Rookies, Scranton Apollos and Wilkes-Barre Barons from 1973 to 1978. He was selected to the All-EBA first team in 1974.

== Personal life ==
Rackley earned his real-estate license and worked as a real-estate broker in New York City. He served as Vice President of Walt Frazier Enterprises and organized teams consisting of NBA players to play all over the world. He served as an NBA scout and owned a casting office for commercials and films. He spent several years as a teacher in the White Plains, New York school system.

He also acted in two movies, The Last Dinosaur and The Fish That Saved Pittsburgh and was a member of the Screen Actors Guild. Rackley also appeared in several television commercials.

Rackley lived in Manhattan, New York following his retirement.

He was Catholic.

== Death ==
Luther Rackley died on Sunday, November 19, 2017, in Harlem, New York.

== Career statistics ==
Legend
GP	Games played	GS	Games started	MPG	Minutes per game
FG%	Field goal percentage	3P%	3-point field goal percentage	FT%	Free throw percentage
RPG	Rebounds per game	APG	Assists per game	SPG	Steals per game
BPG	Blocks per game	PPG	Points per game	**Bold**	Career high

=== NBA/ABA ===
==== Regular season ====
Year	Team	GP	GS	MPG	FG%	3P%	FT%	RPG	APG	SPG	BPG	PPG
1969–70	Cincinnati	66		19.0	.449		.636	**5.7**	.8			**7.6**
1970–71	Cleveland	**74**		**19.4**	.466		.637	5.3	**.9**			**7.6**
1971–72	Cleveland	9		7.2	.440		.250	2.3	.3			2.6
1971–72	New York	62	**5**	10.0	.428		.583	3.0	.3			3.8
1972–73	New York	1	0	2.0	–		–	1.0	.0			.0
1972–73	Memphis (ABA)	57		15.7	**.494**	.000	.650	5.0	.6			7.3
1973–74	Philadelphia	9	0	7.6	.385		**.727**	2.4	.0	.3	.4	2.0
Career (NBA)		221	5	15.6	.451		.626	4.5	.6	.3	.4	6.0
Career (overall)		278	5	15.6	.461	.000	.631	4.6	.6	.3	.4	6.3

==== Playoffs ====
Year	Team	GP	GS	MPG	FG%	FT%	RPG	APG	PPG
1972	New York	11	0	2.6	.143	1.000	.6	.1	.7
