= Eastern Division (NBA) =

1946–1970 division of NBA and BAA

- League: National Basketball Association
- Sport: Basketball
- First season: 1946–47 BAA season
- Folded: 1969–70 NBA season
- Replaced by: Eastern Conference
- Last champion: New York Knicks (3rd title) (1970)
- Most titles: Boston Celtics (9 titles)

The Eastern Division was a division in the National Basketball Association (NBA) and its forerunner, the Basketball Association of America (BAA). The division was created at the start of the 1946–47 BAA season, when the league was created, and was then kept as one of the divisions when BAA merged with the National Basketball League (NBL) to create the NBA on August 3, 1949. Originally, when the merger between the BAA and NBL happened, it was planned for the Eastern and Western divisions to be renamed into the American and National divisions (similar to what Major League Baseball had done following the National League and American League allowing for each league to compete with each other for the World Series in order for their leagues to maintain their independent integrity) with the divisions being re-divided between the Eastern and Western teams in both leagues not long afterward (though it was likely going to have the American Division teams being teams originally playing in the 1948–49 BAA season at the time and the National Division teams being teams planned to have been from the NBL at the time, including the Indianapolis Olympians expansion team), but the sudden dropout of the Oshkosh All-Stars from the initial BAA–NBL merger into the NBA by September 3, 1949, led to the Eastern and Western divisions returning as planned alongside the temporary creation of a Central Division for that season. The division existed until the 1970–71 NBA season when the NBA expanded from 14 to 17 teams and realigned into the Eastern and Western conferences with two divisions each.

== Teams ==
Team	City	Year	From	Year	To	Current division
Team	City	Joined		Left		Current division
Baltimore Bullets (original)	Baltimore, Maryland	1948	Western Division	1954	Folded	—
Baltimore Bullets (now the Washington Wizards)	Baltimore, Maryland	1966	Western Division	1970	Central Division	Southeast Division
Boston Celtics	Boston, Massachusetts	1946	§	1970	Atlantic Division	Atlantic Division
Cincinnati Royals (now the Sacramento Kings)	Cincinnati, Ohio	1962	Western Division	1970	Central Division	Pacific Division
Detroit Pistons	Detroit, Michigan	1967	Western Division	1970	Midwest Division	Central Division
Milwaukee Bucks	Milwaukee, Wisconsin	1968	—†	1970	Midwest Division	Central Division
New York Knicks	New York City, New York	1946	§	1970	Atlantic Division	Atlantic Division
Syracuse Nationals (1949–1963); Philadelphia 76ers (1963–present)	Syracuse, New York; Philadelphia, Pennsylvania	1949	—*	1970	Atlantic Division	Atlantic Division
Philadelphia Warriors (now the Golden State Warriors)	Philadelphia, Pennsylvania	1946	§	1962	Western Division	Pacific Division
Providence Steamrollers	Providence, Rhode Island	1946	§	1949	Folded	—
Toronto Huskies	Toronto, Ontario	1946	§	1947	Folded	—
Washington Capitols	Washington, D.C.	1946; 1948	§	1947; 1951	Western Division; Folded	—

Notes

- § founding BAA team
- † denotes an expansion team.
- * denotes a team that merged from the National Basketball League (NBL)

== Division champions ==
^	Had or tied for the best regular season record for that season

Season	Team	Record	Playoffs result
1946–47	Washington Capitols^	49–11 (.817)	Lost Semifinals
1947–48	Philadelphia Warriors	27–21 (.563)	Lost BAA Finals
1948–49	Washington Capitols	38–22 (.633)	Lost BAA Finals
1949–50	Syracuse Nationals^	51–13 (.797)	Lost NBA Finals
1950–51	Philadelphia Warriors	40–26 (.606)	Lost Division semifinals
1951–52	Syracuse Nationals	40–26 (.606)	Lost Division finals
1952–53	New York Knicks	47–23 (.671)	Lost NBA Finals
1953–54	New York Knicks	47–23 (.671)	Lost Division semifinals (round-robin)
1954–55	Syracuse Nationals^	43–29 (.597)	Lost Division finals
1955–56	Philadelphia Warriors^	45–27 (.625)	Won NBA Finals
1956–57	Boston Celtics^	44–28 (.611)	Won NBA Finals
1957–58	Boston Celtics^	49–23 (.681)	Lost NBA Finals
1958–59	Boston Celtics^	52–20 (.722)	Won NBA Finals
1959–60	Boston Celtics^	59–16 (.787)	Won NBA Finals
1960–61	Boston Celtics^	57–22 (.722)	Won NBA Finals
1961–62	Boston Celtics^	60–20 (.750)	Won NBA Finals
1962–63	Boston Celtics^	58–22 (.725)	Won NBA Finals
1963–64	Boston Celtics^	59–21 (.738)	Won NBA Finals
1964–65	Boston Celtics^	62–18 (.775)	Won NBA Finals
1965–66	Philadelphia 76ers^	55–25 (.688)	Lost Division finals
1966–67	Philadelphia 76ers^	68–13 (.840)	Won NBA Finals
1967–68	Philadelphia 76ers^	62–20 (.756)	Lost Division finals
1968–69	Baltimore Bullets^	57–25 (.695)	Lost Division semifinals
1969–70	New York Knicks^	60–22 (.732)	Won NBA Finals

=== Titles by team ===
Team	Titles	Season(s) won
Boston Celtics	9	1956–57, 1957–58, 1958–59, 1959–60, 1960–61, 1961–62, 1962–63, 1963–64, 1964–65
Syracuse Nationals/Philadelphia 76ers	6	1949–50, 1951–52, 1954–55, 1965–66, 1966–67, 1967–68
Philadelphia Warriors (now the Golden State Warriors)	3	1947–48, 1950–51, 1955–56
New York Knicks	3	1952–53, 1953–54, 1969–70
Washington Capitols	2	1946–47, 1948–49
Baltimore Bullets (now the Washington Wizards)	1	1968–69

== Season results ==
^	Denotes team that won the BAA/NBA championships
^{+}	Denotes team that lost the BAA/NBA Finals
*	Denotes team that qualified for the BAA/NBA playoffs

Season	Team (record)						
Season	1st	2nd	3rd	4th	5th	6th	7th
1946: the Eastern Division was formed with six inaugural members.
1946–47	Washington* (49–11)	Philadelphia^ (35–25)	New York* (33–27)	Providence (28–32)	Boston (22–38)	Toronto (22–38)	
1947: the Toronto Huskies folded during the off-season, while the Washington Capitols left to join the Western Division.
1947–48	Philadelphia^{+} (27–21)	New York* (26–22)	Boston* (20–28)	Providence (6–42)			
1948: the Washington Capitols re-joined the division, while the Baltimore Bullets joined from the Western Division.
1948–49	Washington^{+} (38–22)	New York* (32–28)	Baltimore* (29–31)	Philadelphia* (28–32)	Boston (25–35)	Providence (12–48)	
1949: the Providence Steamrollers folded during the off-season, while the Syracuse Nationals merged from the National Basketball League (NBL).
1949–50	Syracuse^{+} (51–13)	New York* (40–28)	Washington* (32–36)	Philadelphia* (26–42)	Baltimore (25–43)	Boston (22–46)	
1950–51	Philadelphia* (40–26)	Boston* (39–30)	New York^{+} (36–30)	Syracuse* (32–34)	Baltimore (24–42)	Washington (10–25)	
1951: the Washington Capitols folded midway through the 1950–51 season.
1951–52	Syracuse* (40–26)	Boston* (39–27)	New York^{+} (37–29)	Philadelphia* (33–33)	Baltimore (20–46)		
1952–53	New York^{+} (47–23)	Syracuse* (47–24)	Boston* (46–25)	Baltimore* (16–54)	Philadelphia (12–57)		
1953–54	New York* (47–23)	Boston* (42–30)	Syracuse^{+} (42–30)	Philadelphia (29–43)	Baltimore (16–56)		
1954: the Baltimore Bullets folded during the 1954–55 season.
1954–55	Syracuse^ (43–29)	New York* (38–34)	Boston* (36–36)	Philadelphia (33–39)			
1955–56	Philadelphia^ (45–27)	Boston* (39–33)	Syracuse* (35–37)	New York (35–37)			
1956–57	Boston^ (44–28)	Syracuse* (38–34)	Philadelphia* (37–35)	New York (36–36)			
1957–58	Boston^{+} (49–23)	Syracuse* (41–31)	Philadelphia* (37–35)	New York (35–37)			
1958–59	Boston^ (52–20)	New York* (40–32)	Syracuse* (35–37)	Philadelphia (32–40)			
1959–60	Boston^ (59–16)	Philadelphia* (49–26)	Syracuse* (45–30)	New York (27–48)			
1960–61	Boston^ (57–22)	Philadelphia* (46–33)	Syracuse* (38–41)	New York (21–58)			
1961–62	Boston^ (60–20)	Philadelphia* (49–31)	Syracuse* (41–39)	New York (29–51)			
1962: the Cincinnati Royals were shifted from the Western Division, because the Philadelphia Warriors relocated and joined the Western Division as the San Francisco Warriors.
1962–63	Boston^ (58–22)	Syracuse* (48–32)	Cincinnati* (42–38)	New York (21–59)			
1963: the Syracuse Nationals relocated and became the Philadelphia 76ers.
1963–64	Boston^ (59–21)	Cincinnati* (55–25)	Philadelphia* (34–46)	New York (22–58)			
1964–65	Boston^ (62–18)	Cincinnati* (48–32)	Philadelphia* (40–40)	New York (31–49)			
1965–66	Philadelphia* (55–25)	Boston^ (54–26)	Cincinnati* (45–35)	New York (30–50)			
1966: the Baltimore Bullets joined from the Western Division.
1966–67	Philadelphia^ (68–13)	Boston* (60–21)	Cincinnati* (39–42)	New York* (36–45)	Baltimore (20–61)		
1967: the Detroit Pistons joined from the Western Division.
1967–68	Philadelphia* (62–20)	Boston^ (54–28)	New York* (43–39)	Detroit* (40–42)	Cincinnati (39–43)	Baltimore (36–46)	
1968: an expansion team, the Milwaukee Bucks, joined the division.
1968–69	Baltimore* (57–25)	Philadelphia* (55–27)	New York* (54–28)	Boston^ (48–34)	Cincinnati (41–41)	Detroit (32–50)	Milwaukee (27–55)
1969–70	New York^ (60–22)	Milwaukee* (56–26)	Baltimore* (50–32)	Philadelphia* (42–40)	Cincinnati (36–46)	Boston (34–48)	Detroit (31–51)
1970: the NBA divided the league into the Eastern and Western conferences. The Boston Celtics, New York Knicks and Philadelphia 76ers joined the Atlantic Division, the Baltimore Bullets and Cincinnati Royals joined the Central Division, while the Detroit Pistons and Milwaukee Bucks joined the Midwest Division.
