= 1969–70 Philadelphia 76ers season =

American basketball team season

- Head coach: Jack Ramsay
- Arena: The Spectrum

Results
- Record: 42–40 (.512)
- Place: Division: 4th (Eastern)
- Playoff finish: East Division Semifinals (eliminated 1–4)
- Stats at Basketball Reference

Local media
- Television: WPHL-TV
- Radio: WCAU

The 1969–70 Philadelphia 76ers season was the 76ers 21st Franchise season in the NBA and 7th season in Philadelphia. The season prior, Wilt Chamberlain was dealt to the Lakers. However, a more devastating trade was made before the 1969–70 season. Chet Walker, an all-star forward, was traded to the Chicago Bulls for Jim Washington, who played college ball in Philadelphia, and ended up having a journeyman career. Luke Jackson continued to be hobbled by a major injury sustained in the previous season & never played the same again. That, combined with a very poor draft, were factors in the team losing 13 more games than the previous campaign.

== Draft picks ==
This table only displays picks through the second round.

Round	Pick	Player	Position	Nationality	College
1	13	Bud Ogden	SF	United States	Santa Clara
2	28	Willie Taylor	PF/C	United States	LeMoyne–Owen College

== Roster ==
Philadelphia 76ers roster
Players

Pos.	No.	Player	Height	Weight	DOB	From
G	21	Archie Clark	6 ft 2 in (1.88 m)	175 lb (79 kg)		Minnesota
F	32	Billy Cunningham	6 ft 6 in (1.98 m)	210 lb (95 kg)		North Carolina
G	15	Hal Greer	6 ft 2 in (1.88 m)	175 lb (79 kg)		Marshall
SG	14	Matt Guokas	6 ft 5 in (1.96 m)	175 lb (79 kg)		Saint Joseph's
F	20	Fred Hetzel	6 ft 8 in (2.03 m)	220 lb (100 kg)		Davidson
C	18	Darrall Imhoff	6 ft 10 in (2.08 m)	220 lb (100 kg)		California
F	54	Luke Jackson	6 ft 9 in (2.06 m)	240 lb (109 kg)		Texas–Pan American
G	24	Wali Jones	6 ft 2 in (1.88 m)	180 lb (82 kg)		Villanova
F	28	Bud Ogden	6 ft 6 in (1.98 m)	215 lb (98 kg)		Santa Clara
F	12	Jim Washington	6 ft 6 in (1.98 m)	210 lb (95 kg)		Villanova
C	16	George Wilson	6 ft 8 in (2.03 m)	225 lb (102 kg)		Cincinnati

Coaches
Head coach
- Jack Ramsay

Legend
- (DP) Unsigned draft pick
- (FA) Free agent
- (S) Suspended
- Injured

== Regular season ==
=== Season standings ===
Eastern Division	W	L	PCT	GB
x-New York Knicks	60	22	.732	–
x-Milwaukee Bucks	56	26	.683	4
x-Baltimore Bullets	50	32	.610	10
x-Philadelphia 76ers	42	40	.512	18
Cincinnati Royals	36	46	.439	24
Boston Celtics	34	48	.415	26
Detroit Pistons	31	51	.378	29

=== Game log ===
1969–70 Game log
#	Date	Opponent	Score	High points	Record
1	October 17	Los Angeles	126–131	Hal Greer (40)	1–0
2	October 18	@ Cincinnati	134–123	Billy Cunningham (40)	2–0
3	October 22	Phoenix	119–122	Billy Cunningham (26)	3–0
4	October 25	Cincinnati	109–98	Billy Cunningham (21)	3–1
5	October 29	@ Baltimore	129–105	Hal Greer (32)	4–1
6	October 31	Milwaukee	129–125 (OT)	Billy Cunningham (29)	4–2
7	November 1	Boston	131–123	Archie Clark (29)	4–3
8	November 4	N Chicago	113–109	Archie Clark (22)	5–3
9	November 5	Baltimore	139–130	Billy Cunningham (37)	5–4
10	November 7	@ Detroit	128–134	Clark, Cunningham, Greer (26)	5–5
11	November 8	Seattle	125–117	Billy Cunningham (46)	5–6
12	November 11	@ Atlanta	107–124	Billy Cunningham (37)	5–7
13	November 13	@ Phoenix	124–110	Hal Greer (28)	6–7
14	November 15	@ Seattle	136–146	Archie Clark (34)	6–8
15	November 16	@ Los Angeles	125–138	Billy Cunningham (35)	6–9
16	November 18	@ Chicago	119–127	Archie Clark (31)	6–10
17	November 19	San Diego	125–116	Hal Greer (35)	6–11
18	November 21	New York	98–94	Billy Cunningham (25)	6–12
19	November 22	@ Atlanta	132–116	Hal Greer (29)	7–12
20	November 26	@ Boston	135–114	Hal Greer (39)	8–12
21	November 28	Detroit	91–110	Billy Cunningham (26)	9–12
22	November 29	@ Milwaukee	129–111	Billy Cunningham (23)	10–12
23	November 30	@ Cincinnati	107–115	Billy Cunningham (26)	10–13
24	December 2	Milwaukee	122–114	Billy Cunningham (30)	10–14
25	December 5	@ Boston	105–104	Hal Greer (39)	11–14
26	December 6	Cincinnati	102–120	Billy Cunningham (31)	12–14
27	December 9	Los Angeles	99–123	Archie Clark (30)	13–14
28	December 10	@ Cincinnati	121–122	Billy Cunningham (34)	13–15
29	December 12	Detroit	111–125	Hal Greer (23)	14–15
30	December 13	@ New York	100–93	Hal Greer (27)	15–15
31	December 14	Chicago	121–126	Billy Cunningham (32)	16–15
32	December 16	@ Phoenix	141–119	Darrall Imhoff (28)	17–15
33	December 19	@ Seattle	116–123	Billy Cunningham (35)	17–16
34	December 20	@ San Francisco	122–109	Billy Cunningham (35)	18–16
35	December 21	@ Los Angeles	117–133	Cunningham, Imhoff (24)	18–17
36	December 25	@ Baltimore	113–121	Billy Cunningham (41)	18–18
37	December 26	San Francisco	121–141	Billy Cunningham (20)	19–18
38	December 27	@ Atlanta	107–112	Billy Cunningham (34)	19–19
39	December 28	N San Francisco	112–138	Billy Cunningham (29)	20–19
40	December 31	Chicago	109–129	Archie Clark (24)	21–19
41	January 2	Atlanta	117–121	Billy Cunningham (25)	22–19
42	January 4	Boston	120–130	Billy Cunningham (37)	23–19
43	January 9	Seattle	135–132	Billy Cunningham (29)	23–20
44	January 10	N Phoenix	119–117	Hal Greer (29)	23–21
45	January 12	@ Chicago	113–117	Billy Cunningham (26)	23–22
46	January 13	Atlanta	105–136	Archie Clark (29)	24–22
47	January 14	N Seattle	122–110	Darrall Imhoff (25)	24–23
48	January 16	San Francisco	105–127	Archie Clark (21)	25–23
49	January 18	Cincinnati	116–141	Hal Greer (27)	26–23
50	January 23	Baltimore	118–133	Billy Cunningham (29)	27–23
51	January 24	@ Baltimore	111–112	Hal Greer (35)	27–24
52	January 25	San Diego	131–159	Archie Clark (36)	28–24
53	January 26	@ Milwaukee	122–103	Wali Jones (29)	29–24
54	January 28	@ Boston	100–112	Archie Clark (30)	29–25
55	January 30	New York	104–100	Archie Clark (22)	29–26
56	February 1	Los Angeles	113–112	Billy Cunningham (28)	29–27
57	February 3	@ Phoenix	123–131	Billy Cunningham (40)	29–28
58	February 6	@ San Diego	129–124	Billy Cunningham (32)	30–28
59	February 7	@ San Francisco	115–111	Hal Greer (36)	31–28
60	February 8	@ Seattle	117–118	Billy Cunningham (22)	31–29
61	February 10	Milwaukee	139–131	Cunningham, Greer (28)	31–30
62	February 13	New York	151–106	Jim Washington (22)	31–31
63	February 14	@ New York	114–116	Billy Cunningham (36)	31–32
64	February 15	Phoenix	125–159	Jim Washington (34)	32–32
65	February 19	N Detroit	133–114	Archie Clark (28)	33–32
66	February 20	@ Chicago	119–126	Billy Cunningham (26)	33–33
67	February 21	@ Detroit	112–110	Billy Cunningham (26)	34–33
68	February 22	@ Cincinnati	116–136	Clark, Cunningham (32)	34–34
69	February 25	Detroit	105–122	Hal Greer (29)	35–34
70	February 27	San Diego	111–125	Clark, Greer (26)	36–34
71	March 1	Baltimore	99–104	Hal Greer (38)	37–34
72	March 3	@ Milwaukee	116–127	Hal Greer (28)	37–35
73	March 6	Boston	134–150	Hal Greer (30)	38–35
74	March 7	New York	111–104	Billy Cunningham (36)	38–36
75	March 8	@ New York	133–116	Billy Cunningham (39)	39–36
76	March 9	N San Diego	112–131	Hal Greer (38)	40–36
77	March 13	@ Los Angeles	117–128	Darrall Imhoff (22)	40–37
78	March 15	@ San Diego	128–137	Wali Jones (30)	40–38
79	March 17	Atlanta	128–125	Wali Jones (34)	40–39
80	March 18	@ Baltimore	119–113	Hal Greer (27)	41–39
81	March 20	Milwaukee	138–112	Hal Greer (25)	41–40
82	March 22	San Francisco	112–132	Fred Hetzel (25)	42–40

== Playoffs ==
1970 playoff game log
Division Semifinals: 1–4 (home: 0–2; road: 1–2)

Game	Date	Team	Score	High points	High rebounds	High assists	Location Attendance	Series
1	March 25	@ Milwaukee	L 118–125	Clark, Cunningham (21)	Jim Washington (9)	Greer, Jones (7)	University of Wisconsin Field House; 9,686	0–1
2	March 27	@ Milwaukee	W 112–105	Billy Cunningham (37)	Cunningham, Washington (10)	Billy Cunningham (7)	University of Wisconsin Field House; 9,686	1–1
3	March 30	Milwaukee	L 120–156	Archie Clark (20)	Jim Washington (11)	Bud Ogden (6)	Spectrum; 15,244	1–2
4	April 1	Milwaukee	L 111–118	Billy Cunningham (50)	Darrall Imhoff (16)	Wali Jones (7)	Spectrum; 14,206	1–3
5	April 3	@ Milwaukee	L 106–115	Billy Cunningham (28)	Billy Cunningham (18)	Hal Greer (6)	University of Wisconsin Field House; 12,868	1–4

1970 schedule

== Awards and records ==
- Billy Cunningham, All-NBA First Team
