= John Arthurs =

American basketball player (born 1947)

Personal information
- Born: August 15, 1947 (age 79)
- Listed height: 6 ft 4 in (1.93 m)
- Listed weight: 185 lb (84 kg)

Career information
- High school: De La Salle (New Orleans, Louisiana)
- College: Tulane (1966–1969)
- NBA draft: 1969: 6th round, 72nd overall pick
- Drafted by: Milwaukee Bucks
- Position: Guard
- Number: 12

Career history
- 1969–1970: Milwaukee Bucks
- Stats at NBA.com
- Stats at Basketball Reference

John Charles Arthurs (born August 15, 1947) is an American former professional basketball player.

Arthurs played college basketball for the Tulane University, where he was an All-American in 1969. He scored 1,501 points in three seasons, graduating as Tulane's all-time leading scorer. He also served as a first baseman for Tulane's baseball team. After college, Arthurs was selected by the Milwaukee Bucks in the 6th round (73rd pick overall) of the 1969 NBA draft. He appeared in 11 games for the Bucks during the 1969–70 NBA season and tallied 35 points.

When his sports career ended, Arthurs entered the real estate business in New Orleans. He was inducted into the Tulane Athletics Hall of Fame in 1980. He is also a member of the Greater New Orleans Sports Hall of Fame and the Louisiana Basketball Hall of Fame.

== NBA career statistics ==
Legend
GP	Games played	GS	Games started	MPG	Minutes per game
FG%	Field goal percentage	3P%	3-point field goal percentage	FT%	Free throw percentage
RPG	Rebounds per game	APG	Assists per game	SPG	Steals per game
BPG	Blocks per game	PPG	Points per game	**Bold**	Career high

Year	Team	GP	GS	MPG	FG%	3P%	FT%	RPG	APG	SPG	BPG	PPG
1969–70	Milwaukee	11	-	7.8	.343	-	.733	1.3	1.5	-	-	3.2
