= Bob Greacen =

American basketball player

Personal information
- Born: September 15, 1947 (age 79) Merchantville, New Jersey
- Listed height: 6 ft 7 in (2.01 m)
- Listed weight: 206 lb (93 kg)

Career information
- High school: Merchantville (Merchantville, New Jersey)
- College: Rutgers (1966–1969)
- NBA draft: 1969: 2nd round, 17th overall pick
- Drafted by: Milwaukee Bucks
- Playing career: 1969–1972; 1979–1980
- Position: Small forward
- Number: 18, 14

Career history
- 1969–1971: Milwaukee Bucks
- 1971: New York Nets
- 1971–1972: Trenton Pat Pavers
- 1979–1980: Lehigh Valley Jets

Career highlights
- NBA champion (1971)
- Stats at NBA.com
- Stats at Basketball Reference

Robert Alexander Greacen (born September 15, 1947) is an American former professional basketball player.

He grew up in South New Jersey, where he played high school basketball for Merchantville High School and helped lead Merchantville to the NJSIAA Group II state championship in 1965.

In Greacen's three varsity seasons with Rutgers University, he scored 1,154 points. As a sophomore in 1967 he teamed with fellow Rutgers Hall of Famers Bob Lloyd and Jim Valvano to lead the team to a 22–7 record and the first-ever post-season appearance in Rutgers' basketball history. The Scarlet Knights finished third in the 1967 NIT.

A 6'7" forward, Greacen was drafted by the Milwaukee Bucks in the second round of the 1969 NBA draft and by the Miami Floridians in the 1969 ABA draft.

Greacen played two seasons (1969–1971) in the National Basketball Association as a member of the Milwaukee Bucks. He averaged 2.6 points per game in his career and was a member of the Bucks NBA championship team in 1971.

He later briefly played for the New York Nets of the American Basketball Association.

Greacen played in the Eastern Basketball Association (EBA) for the Trenton Pat Pavers during the 1971–72 season. He also played in the renamed Continental Basketball Association (CBA) for the Lehigh Valley Jets during the 1979–80 season.

He was a history teacher at Parkland High School in Allentown, Pennsylvania, where he retired in 2009.

== Career statistics ==
Legend
GP	Games played	GS	Games started	MPG	Minutes per game
FG%	Field goal percentage	3P%	3-point field goal percentage	FT%	Free throw percentage
RPG	Rebounds per game	APG	Assists per game	SPG	Steals per game
BPG	Blocks per game	PPG	Points per game	**Bold**	Career high

=== NBA/ABA ===
==== Regular season ====
Year	Team	GP	MPG	FG%	3P%	FT%	RPG	APG	PPG
1969–70	Milwaukee	**41**	7.1	.404		**.643**	1.4	.7	**2.6**
1970–71†	Milwaukee	2	**21.5**	.083		.429	**3.0**	**6.5**	2.5
1971–72	N.Y. Nets (ABA)	4	5.0	**.500**	–	–	.5	.3	.5
Career (NBA)		43	7.8	.372		.600	1.5	.9	2.6
Career (overall)		47	7.6	.374	–	.600	1.4	.9	2.4

==== Playoffs ====
Year	Team	GP	MPG	FG%	FT%	RPG	APG	PPG
1970	Milwaukee	1	**8.0**	.250	.000	**2.0**	**3.0**	**2.0**
1971†	Milwaukee	**7**	2.3	**.364**	**1.000**	.7	.0	1.7
Career		8	3.0	.333	.800	.9	.4	1.8
