= Flynn Robinson =

American basketball player (1941–2013)

- Robinson with the Milwaukee Bucks

Personal information
- Born: April 28, 1941 Elgin, Illinois, U.S.
- Died: May 23, 2013 (aged 72) Los Angeles, California, U.S.
- Listed height: 6 ft 1 in (1.85 m)
- Listed weight: 185 lb (84 kg)

Career information
- High school: Elgin (Elgin, Illinois)
- College: Casper College (1961–1962); Wyoming (1962–1965)
- NBA draft: 1965: 2nd round, 15th overall pick
- Drafted by: Cincinnati Royals
- Playing career: 1965–1978
- Position: Point guard
- Number: 20, 5, 21, 30, 40

Career history
- 1966–1967: Cincinnati Royals
- 1967–1968: Chicago Bulls
- 1968–1970: Milwaukee Bucks
- 1970–1971: Cincinnati Royals
- 1971–1972: Los Angeles Lakers
- 1972–1973: Baltimore Bullets
- 1973–1974: San Diego Conquistadors
- 1978: Indiana Wizards

Career highlights
- NBA champion (1972); NBA All-Star (1970); 3× First-team All-WAC (1963–1965)

Career NBA and ABA statistics
- Points: 7,577 (14.0 ppg)
- Rebounds: 1,372 (2.5 rpg)
- Assists: 1,628 (3.0 apg)
- Stats at NBA.com
- Stats at Basketball Reference

Flynn James Robinson (April 28, 1941 – May 23, 2013) was an American professional basketball player.

== Early life ==
Flynn was born April 28, 1941, from the union of Sam Hopkins and Dorothy Mae Robinson. Later Flynn's mother married Johnnie Hodge Sr., Flynn's step-father. A native of Murphysboro, Illinois, Robinson later moved to Kinloch, Missouri (St. Louis area), where he attended Dunbar Elementary School thru the 4th Grade as Flynn Hodge. Afterwards Flynn lived in Elgin, Illinois (Chicago area) and graduated in 1959 from Elgin High School. Flynn averaged 31 points per game during both his Junior and Senior years and in 1959 led Elgin to their Regional and Conference Championships.

== College career ==
Robinson attended Southern Illinois University in September 1959 for one quarter and was on the basketball team. Later he transferred to and attended Casper College in Casper, Wyoming, before transferring to the University of Wyoming in Laramie, Wyoming. A 6'1" guard at Wyoming, Robinson was a three-time first-team All-Western Athletic Conference honoree. He averaged 26.2 points per game as a sophomore, 25.6 points as a junior and 27 points as a senior and was the 6th leading scorer in the nation. His 2,049 points place him third on Wyoming's all-time scoring list, and in 2005 he was named to the school's All-Century team.

== NBA career ==
Robinson played seven seasons (1966–1973) in the National Basketball Association and one season (1973–1974) in the later merged American Basketball Association. He averaged 14.5 points per game and 3.1 assists per game during his NBA/ABA career.

The 15th pick in the 1965 NBA draft, Robinson made his NBA debut with the Cincinnati Royals in 1966.

Later, Robinson played for the Chicago Bulls and Milwaukee Bucks. The Bucks' play-by-play radio announcer, Eddie Doucette, called Flynn the "Electric Eye".

In the 1969–70 season with Milwaukee, Robinson averaged a career high 21.8 points per game and was selected to the 1970 NBA All-Star Game, the only All-Star game he would play in. He also led the NBA in free throw percentage that season.

Traded to Los Angeles in 1971 from the Cincinnati Royals, Robinson was a reserve guard behind Jerry West and Gail Goodrich for the Los Angeles Lakers team that won a league-record 33 consecutive games and later won an NBA championship with the team in 1972, playing on what has been considered one of the NBA's Top Ten Teams of all time. When he joined the Lakers, their radio broadcaster, Chick Hearn, called Flynn "Instant Points".

== Legacy ==
In 1992, Robinson returned to Los Angeles where he and his Laker teammates, including legends Wilt Chamberlain, Elgin Baylor, and Jerry West, were honored at the 20th Year Celebration of the 1972 NBA Champion Los Angeles Lakers.

In January 2005, Robinson was named to Wyoming's All-Century Team.

In 2012, while living in the Los Angeles area, Robinson again was honored with his surviving teammates at the 40th Year Celebration of the 1972 NBA Champion Lakers, who continue to hold the Historic 33-Games Win Streak, a long-standing pro sports record. The Lakers presented Flynn and each surviving team member with a huge expensive Diamond Cluster Ring.

In his 50s and 60s, Flynn played basketball at the Senior Olympics level.

== Death ==
Robinson died on May 23, 2013, in Los Angeles, of multiple myeloma. He was 72 and was survived by his wife, Nancy Pitts-Robinson, four brothers and two sisters. A notable surviving brother is Air Force Captain Johnnie Hodge Jr., who was one of our country's 1979 "Outstanding Young Men of America".[5]

== NBA/ABA career statistics ==
Legend
GP	Games played	GS	Games started	MPG	Minutes per game
FG%	Field goal percentage	3P%	3-point field goal percentage	FT%	Free throw percentage
RPG	Rebounds per game	APG	Assists per game	SPG	Steals per game
BPG	Blocks per game	PPG	Points per game	**Bold**	Career high
†	Won an NBA championship	*	Led the league

=== Regular season ===
Year	Team	GP	MPG	FG%	3P%	FT%	RPG	APG	STL	BLK	PPG
1966–67	Cincinnati	76	15.0	.457	–	.779	1.8	1.4	–	–	8.8
1967–68	Cincinnati	2	8.0	.300	–	.429	2.0	2.5	–	–	4.5
1967–68	Chicago	73	27.8	.441	–	.828	3.7	2.9	–	–	16.0
1968–69	Chicago	**18**	30.6	.423	–	.833	**3.8**	3.2	–	–	19.1
1968–69	Milwaukee	**65**	31.8	.436	–	.841	3.6	4.9	–	–	20.3
1969–70	Milwaukee	81	**34.1**	.477	–	**.898***	3.2	**5.5**	–	–	**21.8**
1970–71	Cincinnati	71	19.3	.458	–	.855	2.0	1.9	–	–	13.3
1971–72†	L.A. Lakers	64	15.7	.490	–	.860	1.8	2.2	–	–	9.9
1972–73	L.A. Lakers	6	7.8	**.500**	–	.750	1.2	1.3	–	–	5.7
1972–73	Baltimore	38	15.3	.458	–	.839	1.4	2.0	–	–	6.9
1973–74	San Diego(ABA)	49	15.9	.457	.267	.765	1.6	2.3	.5	.0	8.8
Career		543	22.7	.456	.267	.846	2.5	3.0	.5	.0	14.0
All-Star		1	8.0	.750	–	–	1.0	2.0	–	–	6.0

=== Playoffs ===
Year	Team	GP	MPG	FG%	FT%	RPG	APG	PPG
1967	Cincinnati	4	18.0	.511	.500	1.8	2.0	12.5
1968	Chicago	5	**36.0**	.429	.708	2.0	2.6	**20.2**
1970	Milwaukee	**10**	30.0	.326	**.880**	**2.3**	**5.0**	12.8
1972†	L.A. Lakers	7	10.3	.463	.700	1.9	.7	6.4
1973	Baltimore	1	2.0	**.667**	–	1.0	.0	4.0
Career		27	23.2	.406	.795	2.0	2.8	12.1
