= 1969–70 NBA season =

24th NBA season

- League: National Basketball Association
- Sport: Basketball
- Duration: October 14, 1969 – March 22, 1970; March 25 – April 20, 1970 (Playoffs); April 24 – May 8, 1970 (Finals)
- Games: 82
- Teams: 14
- TV partner: ABC

Draft
- Top draft pick: Lew Alcindor (Note: Changed his name to Kareem Abdul-Jabbar before the 1971–72 season.)
- Picked by: Milwaukee Bucks

Regular season
- Top seed: New York Knicks
- Season MVP: Willis Reed (New York)
- Top scorer: Jerry West (L.A. Lakers)

Playoffs
- Eastern champions: New York Knicks
- Eastern runners-up: Milwaukee Bucks
- Western champions: Los Angeles Lakers
- Western runners-up: Atlanta Hawks

Finals
- Champions: New York Knicks
- Runners-up: Los Angeles Lakers
- Finals MVP: Willis Reed (New York)

NBA seasons
- ← 1968–69 1970–71 →

The 1969–70 NBA season was the 24th season of the National Basketball Association. The season ended with the New York Knicks winning the NBA championship, beating the Los Angeles Lakers 4 games to 3 in the NBA Finals.

== Regular season ==
The 1969–70 season saw the NBA into a new decade as well as a new era. The retirement of Bill Russell from the Boston Celtics at the end of the 1968–69 season effectively signaled the end of the Celtics dynasty that had dominated the NBA for the past decade.

The New York Knicks were the top club in the league. They had a solid team of players led by star center Willis Reed and rising star guard Walt Frazier. Dave DeBusschere, who had been acquired from the Detroit Pistons the previous year, combined with Frazier and Reed to anchor the league's best defense. Coach Red Holzman led the club to wins in 60 of its 82 regular season games to pace the league.

In just their second season in the league, the Milwaukee Bucks totaled 56 wins helped by rookie superstar Lew Alcindor. Alcindor averaged 29 points per game on 52% shooting. He was also third in rebounds, seventh in shooting accuracy, and second in minutes played. Coach Larry Costello's team also had a strong backcourt of Jon McGlocklin and Flynn Robinson, and two ex-Cincinnati Royals, but Alcindor's arrival on the team nearly doubled their win total from the previous season, earning him rookie of the year honors.

The Baltimore Bullets also reached the 50-win plateau. Coach Gene Shue led a squad looking to improve after their early playoff exit the previous year. Guards Earl Monroe and Kevin Loughery were the team's main scoring threats, while center Wes Unseld and forward Gus Johnson excelled at rebounding, giving the Bullets more field goals than any other NBA team that year.

The Atlanta Hawks won the NBA's West Division title with 48 wins. Under coach Richie Guerin, they fielded a solid starting five, led again by scorer Lou Hudson. An early-season trade with Detroit netted star center Walt Bellamy.

== Division standings ==
=== Eastern Division ===
Eastern Division	W	L	PCT	GB
x-New York Knicks	60	22	.732	–
x-Milwaukee Bucks	56	26	.683	4
x-Baltimore Bullets	50	32	.610	10
x-Philadelphia 76ers	42	40	.512	18
Cincinnati Royals	36	46	.439	24
Boston Celtics	34	48	.415	26
Detroit Pistons	31	51	.378	29

=== Western Division ===
Western Division	W	L	PCT	GB
x-Atlanta Hawks	48	34	.585	–
x-Los Angeles Lakers	46	36	.561	2
x-Chicago Bulls	39	43	.476	9
x-Phoenix Suns	39	43	.476	9
Seattle SuperSonics	36	46	.439	12
San Francisco Warriors	30	52	.366	18
San Diego Rockets	27	55	.329	21

x – clinched playoff spot

== Playoffs ==
Division Semifinals
E1	New York*	4
E3	Baltimore	3
Eastern Division
E4	Philadelphia	1
E2	Milwaukee	4
W1	Atlanta*	4
W3	Chicago	1
Western Division
W4	Phoenix	3
W2	Los Angeles	4

Division Finals
E1	New York*	4
E2	Milwaukee	1
W1	Atlanta*	0
W2	Los Angeles	4

NBA Finals
E1	New York*	4
W2	Los Angeles	3

- * Division winner
- Bold Series winner
- Italic Team with home-court advantage in NBA Finals

== Statistics leaders ==
Category	Player	Team	Stat
Points per game	Jerry West	Los Angeles Lakers	31.2
Rebounds per game	Elvin Hayes	San Diego Rockets	16.9
Assists per game	Lenny Wilkens	Seattle SuperSonics	9.1
FG%	Johnny Green	Cincinnati Royals	.559
FT%	Flynn Robinson	Milwaukee Bucks	.898

== NBA awards ==
- Most Valuable Player: Willis Reed, New York Knicks
- Rookie of the Year: Lew Alcindor, Milwaukee Bucks
- Coach of the Year: Red Holzman, New York Knicks
- All-NBA First Team:
  - F – Billy Cunningham, Philadelphia 76ers
  - F – Connie Hawkins, Phoenix Suns
  - C – Willis Reed, New York Knicks
  - G – Walt Frazier, New York Knicks
  - G – Jerry West, Los Angeles Lakers
- All-NBA Second Team:
  - F – John Havlicek, Boston Celtics
  - F – Gus Johnson, Baltimore Bullets
  - C – Lew Alcindor, Milwaukee Bucks
  - G – Lou Hudson, Atlanta Hawks
  - G – Oscar Robertson, Cincinnati Royals
- All-NBA Rookie Team:
  - Dick Garrett, Los Angeles Lakers
  - Mike Davis, Baltimore Bullets
  - Jo Jo White, Boston Celtics
  - Lew Alcindor, Milwaukee Bucks
  - Bob Dandridge, Milwaukee Bucks
- NBA All-Defensive First Team:
  - Dave DeBusschere, New York Knicks
  - Gus Johnson, Baltimore Bullets
  - Willis Reed, New York Knicks
  - Walt Frazier, New York Knicks
  - Jerry West, Los Angeles Lakers
- NBA All-Defensive Second Team:
  - John Havlicek, Boston Celtics
  - Bill Bridges, Atlanta Hawks
  - Lew Alcindor, Milwaukee Bucks
  - Joe Caldwell, Atlanta Hawks
  - Jerry Sloan, Chicago Bulls

== See also ==
- 1970 NBA Finals
- 1969–70 ABA season
- List of NBA regular season records
