= 1973–74 Phoenix Suns season =

Professional basketball season

- Head coach: John MacLeod
- General manager: Jerry Colangelo
- Owners: Karl Eller, Don Pitt, Don Diamond, Bhavik Darji, Marvin Meyer, Richard L. Bloch
- Arena: Arizona Veterans Memorial Coliseum

Results
- Record: 30–52 (.366)
- Place: Division: 4th (Pacific); Conference: 8th (Western)
- Playoff finish: Did not qualify
- Stats at Basketball Reference

Local media
- Television: KTAR-TV
- Radio: KTAR

The 1973–74 Phoenix Suns season was the sixth for the Phoenix Suns of the National Basketball Association. It was the first of 14 seasons head coach John MacLeod spent with Phoenix. The season would also be the last for former All-Star forward/center Connie Hawkins, traded to the Los Angeles Lakers after appearing in nine games for the Suns. Charlie Scott would repeat as an All-Star, but who missed 30 games due to injury despite his NBA career-high 25.4 points a game. The team went on to finish the season 30–52, a career-worst for MacLeod and the franchise's poorest record since their inaugural season.

Dick Van Arsdale averaged 17.8 points on the season, while Neal Walk averaged 16.8 points and a team-high 10.2 rebounds per contest. Keith Erickson, obtained by the Suns along with a future second-round pick in the Hawkins trade, enjoyed a career-high 14.6 points a game in his ninth year in the NBA and first with Phoenix.

Van Arsdale was named to the NBA All-Defensive Second Team, while Mike Bantom, a rookie out of Saint Joseph's, was named to the All-Rookie Team.

== Offseason ==
=== NBA draft ===
Round	Pick	Player	Position	Nationality	College
1	8	Mike Bantom	Forward	United States	Saint Joseph's
2	33	Gary Melchionni	Guard	United States	Duke
3	42	Joe Reaves	Forward	United States	Bethel (Tennessee)
3	43	Steve Mitchell	Center	United States	Kansas State
4	60	Ron Robinson	Forward	United States	Memphis State
5	77	Clinton Harris	Forward	United States	Iowa State
6	94	Gene Doyle	Center	United States	Holy Cross
7	111	Jerry Bisbano	Guard	United States	Southwestern Louisiana
8	128	Jim Owens	Forward	United States	Arizona State
9	144	Sandy Smith	Guard	United States	Winston-Salem
10	158	Claude White	Guard	United States	Elmhurst
11	170	Lynn Greer	Guard	United States	Virginia State
12	179	Lyman Williamson	Forward	United States	Samford
13	186	Kalevi Sarkalahti	Forward	Finland	Brigham Young

== Roster ==
1973–74 Phoenix Suns roster
Players

Pos.	No.	Player	Height	Weight	DOB	From
F	40	Mike Bantom	6 ft 9 in (2.06 m)	200 lb (91 kg)	1951-12-03	Saint Joseph's
F	20	Corky Calhoun	6 ft 7 in (2.01 m)	210 lb (95 kg)	1950-11-01	Penn
F	24	Bill Chamberlain	6 ft 6 in (1.98 m)	188 lb (85 kg)	1949-12-16	North Carolina
C	31	Bob Christian	6 ft 10 in (2.08 m)	255 lb (116 kg)	1946-05-11	Grambling State
G/F	14	Keith Erickson	6 ft 5 in (1.96 m)	195 lb (88 kg)	1944-04-19	UCLA
F	16	Lamar Green	6 ft 7 in (2.01 m)	210 lb (95 kg)	1947-03-22	Morehead State
G	11	Clem Haskins	6 ft 3 in (1.91 m)	195 lb (88 kg)	1943-07-11	Western Kentucky
G	25	Gary Melchionni	6 ft 2 in (1.88 m)	185 lb (84 kg)	1951-01-19	Duke
G/F	45	Jim Owens	6 ft 5 in (1.96 m)	200 lb (91 kg)	1950-05-01	Arizona State
G	33	Charlie Scott (injured)	6 ft 5 in (1.96 m)	175 lb (79 kg)	1948-12-15	North Carolina
G/F	5	Dick Van Arsdale	6 ft 5 in (1.96 m)	210 lb (95 kg)	1943-02-22	Indiana
C	41	Neal Walk	6 ft 10 in (2.08 m)	220 lb (100 kg)	1948-07-29	Florida

Coaches
Head coach
- John MacLeod (Bellarmine)
Assistant(s)
- Denny Price (Oklahoma)

Legend
- (DP) Unsigned draft pick
- (FA) Free agent
- (S) Suspended
- Injured

== Regular season ==
=== Standings ===
Pacific Division	W	L	PCT	GB	Home	Road	Neutral	Div
y-Los Angeles Lakers	47	35	.573	–	30–11	17–24	–	14–12
Golden State Warriors	44	38	.537	3	23–18	20–20	1–0	15–11
Seattle SuperSonics	36	46	.439	11	22–19	14–27	–	12–14
Phoenix Suns	30	52	.366	17	24–17	6–34	0–1	11–15
Portland Trail Blazers	27	55	.329	20	22–19	5–34	0–2	13–13

#	Western Conference				
#	Team	W	L	PCT	GB
1	z-Milwaukee Bucks	59	23	.720	–
2	x-Chicago Bulls	54	28	.659	5
3	x-Detroit Pistons	52	30	.634	7
4	y-Los Angeles Lakers	47	35	.573	12
5	Golden State Warriors	44	38	.537	15
6	Seattle SuperSonics	36	46	.439	23
7	Kansas City–Omaha Kings	33	49	.402	26
8	Phoenix Suns	30	52	.366	29
9	Portland Trail Blazers	27	55	.329	32

=== Game log ===
1973–74 game log
Total: 30–52 (home: 24–17; road: 6–35)
October: 2–8 (home: 2–3; road: 0–5)

Game	Date	Team	Score	High points	Location Attendance	Record	Streak
1	October 10	Seattle	W 115–111	Charlie Scott (26)	Arizona Veterans Memorial Coliseum; 8,738	1–0	W 1
2	October 12	Milwaukee	L 84–107	Lamar Green (14)	Arizona Veterans Memorial Coliseum; 9,033	1–1	L 1
3	October 14	Golden State	L 95–120	Charlie Scott (19)	Arizona Veterans Memorial Coliseum; 7,030	1–2	L 2
4	October 20	Atlanta	W 118–108	Dick Van Arsdale (37)	Arizona Veterans Memorial Coliseum; 8,009	2–2	W 1
5	October 21	@ Seattle	L 112–116	Charlie Scott (25)	Seattle Center Coliseum; 11,964	2–3	L 1
6	October 23	@ Golden State	L 109–121	Charlie Scott, Dick Van Arsdale (23)	Oakland–Alameda County Coliseum Arena; 3,007	2–4	L 2
7	October 24	Detroit	L 99–115	Mike Bantom (22)	Arizona Veterans Memorial Coliseum; 6,307	2–5	L 3
8	October 26	@ Kansas City-Omaha	L 93–98	Charlie Scott (26)	Municipal Auditorium; 4,917	2–6	L 4
9	October 27	@ Milwaukee	L 95–104		Milwaukee Arena; 9,975	2–7	L 5
10	October 30	@ Atlanta	L 101–122	Joe Reaves (21)	Omni Coliseum; 9,070	2–8	L 6

November: 5–8 (home: 3–1; road: 2–7)

Game	Date	Team	Score	High points	Location Attendance	Record	Streak
11	November 2	@ Detroit	L 107–114	Charlie Scott (30)	Cobo Arena; 5,317	2–9	L 7
12	November 4	@ Capital	L 99–102	Dick Van Arsdale, Neal Walk (19)	Capital Centre; 5,316	2–10	L 8
13	November 7	@ Philadelphia	L 115–122	Charlie Scott (31)	The Spectrum; 4,366	2–11	L 9
14	November 9	@ Boston	L 107–122	Charlie Scott (24)	Boston Garden; 9,953	2–12	L 10
15	November 13	Chicago	W 116–108	Charlie Scott (38)	Arizona Veterans Memorial Coliseum; 6,045	3–12	W 1
16	November 15	Philadelphia	W 116–94	Charlie Scott (33)	Arizona Veterans Memorial Coliseum; 6,142	4–12	W 2
17	November 17	Los Angeles	L 110–130	Charlie Scott (30)	Arizona Veterans Memorial Coliseum; 11,498	4–13	L 1
18	November 20	@ Buffalo	L 100–127	Dick Van Arsdale (23)	Buffalo Memorial Auditorium; 6,088	4–14	L 2
19	November 21	@ Detroit	L 104–107	Charlie Scott, Neal Walk (32)	Cobo Arena; 3,534	4–15	L 3
20	November 23	@ Chicago	W 99–94	Charlie Scott (30)	Chicago Stadium; 8,742	5–15	W 1
21	November 27	@ Houston	L 111–125	Dick Van Arsdale (27)	Hofheinz Pavilion; 2,756	5–16	L 1
22	November 29	Kansas City-Omaha	W 119–99	Mike Bantom (26)	Arizona Veterans Memorial Coliseum; 6,386	6–16	W 1
23	November 30	@ Portland	W 107–99	Clem Haskins (36)	Memorial Coliseum; 10,720	7–16	W 2

December: 8–8 (home: 6–4; road: 2–4)

Game	Date	Team	Score	High points	Location Attendance	Record	Streak
24	December 1	Detroit	L 109–121	Dick Van Arsdale (21)	Arizona Veterans Memorial Coliseum; 6,496	7–17	L 1
25	December 4	@ Los Angeles	L 103–120	Charlie Scott (23)	The Forum; 11,746	7–18	L 2
26	December 5	Golden State	W 103–97	Charlie Scott (27)	Arizona Veterans Memorial Coliseum; 5,553	8–18	W 1
27	December 7	Capital	W 114–92	Charlie Scott (40)	Arizona Veterans Memorial Coliseum; 6,089	9–18	W 2
28	December 9	@ Cleveland	W 117–106	Charlie Scott (31)	Cleveland Arena; 3,042	10–18	W 3
29	December 11	@ New York	L 97–105	Dick Van Arsdale (23)	Madison Square Garden; 18,366	10–19	L 1
30	December 13	Portland	L 108–119	Charlie Scott (32)	Arizona Veterans Memorial Coliseum; 5,494	10–20	L 2
31	December 15	Boston	W 121–120	Charlie Scott (41)	Arizona Veterans Memorial Coliseum; 7,362	11–20	W 1
32	December 16	@ Seattle	W 113–109	Charlie Scott (38)	Seattle Center Coliseum; 9,778	12–20	W 2
33	December 18	@ Portland	L 117–133	Dick Van Arsdale (26)	Memorial Coliseum; 5,982	12–21	L 1
34	December 19	Philadelphia	L 98–101	Charlie Scott (44)	Arizona Veterans Memorial Coliseum; 5,246	12–22	L 2
35	December 22	Milwaukee	W 121–112	Charlie Scott (31)	Arizona Veterans Memorial Coliseum; 8,013	13–22	W 1
36	December 25	Los Angeles	W 135–100	Charlie Scott (27)	Arizona Veterans Memorial Coliseum; 9,253	14–22	W 2
37	December 27	Seattle	W 111–100	Charlie Scott (33)	Arizona Veterans Memorial Coliseum; 7,755	15–22	W 3
38	December 28	@ Los Angeles	L 107–119	Charlie Scott (29)	The Forum; 13,685	15–23	L 1
39	December 29	Buffalo	L 108–120	Charlie Scott (30)	Arizona Veterans Memorial Coliseum; 9,116	15–24	L 2

January: 6–7 (home: 5–3; road: 1–4)

Game	Date	Team	Score	High points	Location Attendance	Record	Streak
40	January 2	@ Atlanta	W 116–113	Dick Van Arsdale (28)	Omni Coliseum; 9,232	16–24	W 1
41	January 4	@ Kansas City-Omaha	L 97–122	Charlie Scott (28)	Municipal Auditorium; 4,837	16–25	L 1
42	January 5	@ Milwaukee	L 109–118	Dick Van Arsdale (22)	Milwaukee Arena; 9,812	16–26	L 2
43	January 6	@ Chicago	L 116–120 (OT)	Charlie Scott (30)	Chicago Stadium; 6,013	16–27	L 3
44	January 9	Houston	W 105–101	Charlie Scott (19)	Arizona Veterans Memorial Coliseum; 5,924	17–27	W 1
45	January 11	Kansas City-Omaha	L 100–117	Charlie Scott (24)	Arizona Veterans Memorial Coliseum; 6,747	17–28	L 1
46	January 13	Seattle	L 112–123	Neal Walk (28)	Arizona Veterans Memorial Coliseum; 5,769	17–29	L 2
All-Star Break
47	January 17	@ Golden State	L 120–127	Charlie Scott (31)	Oakland–Alameda County Coliseum Arena; 3,011	17–30	L 3
48	January 19	New York	W 112–89	Charlie Scott (26)	Arizona Veterans Memorial Coliseum; 9,468	18–30	W 1
49	January 23	Cleveland	W 110–103	Charlie Scott (25)	Arizona Veterans Memorial Coliseum; 5,017	19–30	W 2
50	January 25	Milwaukee	L 108–112	Charlie Scott (29)	Arizona Veterans Memorial Coliseum; 7,660	19–31	L 1
51	January 27	Capital	W 127–107	Keith Erickson (28)	Arizona Veterans Memorial Coliseum; 5,277	20–31	W 1
52	January 31	Portland	W 112–100	Charlie Scott (25)	Arizona Veterans Memorial Coliseum; 5,252	21–31	W 2

February: 4–12 (home: 4–3; road: 0–9)

Game	Date	Team	Score	High points	Location Attendance	Record	Streak
53	February 1	@ Los Angeles	L 110–121	Gary Melchionni, Dick Van Arsdale (20)	The Forum; 13,478	21–32	L 1
54	February 2	Los Angeles	W 119–112	Dick Van Arsdale, Neal Walk (25)	Arizona Veterans Memorial Coliseum; 8,068	22–32	W 1
55	February 5	@ New York	L 90–106	Dick Van Arsdale (27)	Madison Square Garden; 18,884	22–33	L 1
56	February 6	@ Capital	L 101–109	Clem Haskins (23)	Capital Centre; 6,738	22–34	L 2
57	February 8	Detroit	L 94–99	Dick Van Arsdale (18)	Arizona Veterans Memorial Coliseum; 8,511	22–35	L 3
58	February 10	Golden State	L 105–121	Bob Christian (21)	Arizona Veterans Memorial Coliseum; 5,121	22–36	L 4
59	February 12	@ Portland	L 104–113	Keith Erickson (24)	Memorial Coliseum; 4,189	22–37	L 5
60	February 14	Houston	W 107–99	Dick Van Arsdale (24)	Arizona Veterans Memorial Coliseum; 5,661	23–37	W 1
61	February 16	Atlanta	W 124–123 (OT)	Neal Walk (29)	Arizona Veterans Memorial Coliseum; 8,518	24–37	W 2
62	February 17	Portland	W 112–100	Mike Bantom (22)	Arizona Veterans Memorial Coliseum; 5,575	25–37	W 3
63	February 19	@ Chicago	L 96–130	Dick Van Arsdale (20)	Chicago Stadium; 7,451	25–38	L 1
64	February 22	@ Kansas-City Omaha	L 104–119	Keith Erickson (23)	Municipal Auditorium; 8,322	25–39	L 2
65	February 23	@ Detroit	L 107–119	Dick Van Arsdale (18)	Cobo Arena; 7,926	25–40	L 3
66	February 24	@ Cleveland	L 97–101	Keith Erickson, Neal Walk (22)	Cleveland Arena; 3,288	25–41	L 4
67	February 26	@ Golden State	L 100–120	Clem Haskins (31)	Oakland–Alameda County Coliseum Arena; 3,234	25–42	L 5
68	February 27	Chicago	L 95–107	Keith Erickson (34)	Arizona Veterans Memorial Coliseum; 5,105	25–43	L 6

March: 5–9 (home: 4–3; road: 1–6)

Game	Date	Team	Score	High points	Location Attendance	Record	Streak
69	March 1	@ Houston	L 111–117	Keith Erickson (23)	Hofheinz Pavilion; 2,547	25–44	L 7
70	March 3	Kansas City-Omaha	W 113–100	Dick Van Arsdale, Neal Walk (23)	Arizona Veterans Memorial Coliseum; 4,780	26–44	W 1
71	March 5	Chicago	L 91–111	Neal Walk (21)	Arizona Veterans Memorial Coliseum; 6,156	26–45	L 1
72	March 7	Boston	L 97–99	Gary Melchionni (23)	Arizona Veterans Memorial Coliseum; 6,242	26–46	L 2
73	March 9	Cleveland	W 109–100	Dick Van Arsdale (26)	Arizona Veterans Memorial Coliseum; 6,153	27–46	W 1
74	March 11	@ Milwaukee	L 92–105	Neal Walk (20)	Milwaukee Arena; 9,027	27–47	L 1
75	March 12	@ Buffalo	L 94–124	Keith Erickson (20)	Buffalo Memorial Auditorium; 14,244	27–48	L 2
76	March 13	@ Boston	L 97–104	Corky Calhoun, Keith Erickson, Dick Van Arsdale (15)	Boston Garden; 6,751	27–49	L 3
77	March 15	@ Philadelphia	L 101–108	Keith Erickson (24)	Hershey, PA; 4,473	27–50	L 4
78	March 17	@ Seattle	W 133–108	Keith Erickson (30)	Seattle Center Coliseum; 13,007	28–50	W 1
79	March 20	New York	L 104–106 (OT)	Keith Erickson, Neal Walk (18)	Arizona Veterans Memorial Coliseum; 8,054	28–51	L 1
80	March 22	Buffalo	W 126–119	Mike Bantom, Clem Haskins, Gary Melchionni (22)	Arizona Veterans Memorial Coliseum; 8,687	29–51	W 1
81	March 24	Golden State	W 134–121	Keith Erickson (40)	Arizona Veterans Memorial Coliseum; 7,011	30–51	W 2
82	March 27	@ Seattle	L 123–127	Clem Haskins (28)	Seattle Center Coliseum; 12,528	30–52	L 1

1973–74 schedule

== Awards and honors ==
=== All-Star ===
- Charlie Scott was selected to replace Jerry West in the All-Star Game. It was his second consecutive All-Star selection.

=== Season ===
- Dick Van Arsdale was named to the NBA All-Defensive Second Team.
- Mike Bantom was named to the NBA All-Rookie First Team.

== Player statistics ==
Legend
GP	Games played	GS	Games started	MPG	Minutes per game
FG%	Field-goal percentage	FT%	Free-throw percentage	RPG	Rebounds per game
APG	Assists per game	SPG	Steals per game	BPG	Blocks per game
PPG	Points per game

=== Season ===
Player	GP	GS	MPG	FG%	FT%	RPG	APG	SPG	BPG	PPG
Mike Bantom	76	37	26.1	.399	.662	6.8	2.1	.7	.6	10.1
Corky Calhoun	77	54	28.7	.461	.760	5.3	1.8	.9	.4	8.2
Bill Chamberlain	28	1	13.1	.438	.696	2.9	1.3	.7	.4	5.5
Bob Christian	81	1	15.4	.486	.702	4.2	1.2	.2	.4	4.8
Keith Erickson*	66	48	30.8	.477	.801	6.3	3.1	1.0	.3	14.6
Lamar Green	72	20	15.3	.407	.559	4.9	0.6	.4	.5	4.1
Clem Haskins	81	20	22.5	.460	.842	2.7	3.2	1.0	.2	11.1
Connie Hawkins*	8	7	27.9	.486	.667	5.4	3.5	1.0	.4	11.3
Gary Melchionni	69	15	18.1	.460	.860^	2.1	2.1	.6	.1	7.2
Jim Owens	17	0	5.9	.538†	.786	0.5	0.9	.3	.0	3.1
Joe Reaves*	7	0	5.4	.545†	.364	1.1	0.1	.0	.3	2.3
Charlie Scott	52	51	38.5+	.459	.781	4.3	5.2+	1.9+	.4	25.4+
Dick Van Arsdale	78	76	36.3+	.500†	.853^	2.8	4.2+	1.2+	.2	17.8+
Neal Walk	82	80	31.1	.460	.791	10.2	4.0	.9	.7	16.8

* – Stats with the Suns.
† – Minimum 560 field goal attempts.
^ – Minimum 160 free throw attempts.
+ – Minimum 70 games played.

== Transactions ==
=== Trades ===
October 8, 1973	To Atlanta Hawks 1976 second-round draft pick ( (United States) Bob Carrington) 1977 third-round draft pick ( (United States) Eddie Johnson)	To Phoenix Suns (United States) Bob Christian
October 9, 1973	To Capital Bullets (United States) Walt Wesley	To Phoenix Suns 1974 third-round draft pick ( (United States) Earl Williams) 1975 third-round draft pick ( (United States) Bayard Forrest)
October 30, 1973	To Los Angeles Lakers (United States) Connie Hawkins	To Phoenix Suns (United States) Keith Erickson 1974 second-round draft pick ( (United States) Fred Saunders)
January 24, 1974	To Golden State Warriors 1975 third-round draft pick ( (United States) Otis Johnson)	To Phoenix Suns (United States) Bill Chamberlain

=== Free agents ===
==== Subtractions ====
Date	Player	Reason left	New team
September 14, 1973	Paul Stovall	Waived	San Diego Conquistadors (ABA)
September 18, 1973	Scott English	Waived	Virginia Squires (ABA)
September 19, 1973	Mo Layton	Waived	Portland Trail Blazers
November 27, 1973	Joe Reaves	Waived	Memphis Tams (ABA)
