= Corky Calhoun =

American basketball player (born 1950)

Personal information
- Born: November 1, 1950 (age 76) Waukegan, Illinois, U.S.
- Listed height: 6 ft 7 in (2.01 m)
- Listed weight: 210 lb (95 kg)

Career information
- High school: Waukegan (Waukegan, Illinois)
- College: Penn (1969–1972)
- NBA draft: 1972: 1st round, 4th overall pick
- Drafted by: Phoenix Suns
- Playing career: 1972–1979
- Position: Small forward
- Number: 20, 10

Career history
- 1972–1974: Phoenix Suns
- 1974–1976: Los Angeles Lakers
- 1976–1978: Portland Trail Blazers
- 1978–1980: Indiana Pacers

Career highlights
- NBA champion (1977); Robert V. Geasey Trophy (1972)

Career statistics
- Points: 2,896 (5.3 ppg)
- Rebounds: 1,962 (3.6 rpg)
- Assists: 601 (1.1 apg)
- Stats at NBA.com
- Stats at Basketball Reference

David "Corky" Calhoun (born November 1, 1950) is an American former professional basketball player. Calhoun played in the NBA from 1972 to 1980 after playing college basketball for the Penn Quakers. Calhoun was the first-round selection (4th overall) of the Phoenix Suns in the 1972 NBA draft. He won an NBA championship as a member of the 1976–1977 Portland Trail Blazers, playing an important part with his defense on Julius Erving in the championship series.

== Early life ==
Calhoun was born on November 1, 1950, in Waukegan, Illinois. His father Ace Calhoun played semipro basketball. He attended Waukegan High School. In 1967, his team was undefeated and Calhoun was an all-state basketball player. As a senior, he averaged around a modest 15 points per game because of the team's deliberate and defense-oriented playing style; the team averaging only 55 points per game. He was a high school All-American.

== College career ==
Calhoun attended the University of Pennsylvania on an academic scholarship, where he was in the Wharton School of Finance. Calhoun was heavily recruited by University of Pennsylvania Quakers basketball head coach Dirk Harter and his staff (including assistant coach Digger Phelps). He was also heavily recruited by George Washington University, and both teams’ head coaches had come to recruit him in Waukegan the day he decided to attend Penn. He had also been recruited by the University of Wisconsin, the University of Illinois and Drake University, and his final choice came down to Penn and Wisconsin; choosing Penn because he appreciated the players' team first attitude. Calhoun and his father, who worked a number of jobs to support his family, also were swayed by the educational opportunities his son would have at Penn to attend the Wharton School.

As a 6 ft 5 in guard on Penn's undefeated freshman team, he averaged 15.8 points per game. He was 6 ft 7 in (2.01 m) by his sophomore year, with coach Harter stating Calhoun was capable of playing guard, forward or center; though he would be primarily used at forward. He was named to the Associated Press's first-team All-Pennsylvania team as a sophomore, at center.

Calhoun played three seasons of varsity basketball at Penn in the Ivy League (1969 to 1972). He played under head coach Harter as a sophomore and junior, and then under new head coach Chuck Daley as a senior. In 84 games as a Quaker, Calhoun averaged 12.7 points and 8.1 rebounds per game. The team went 25–2 his sophomore year and 28–1 his junior year under Harter, and then 25–3 under Daley his senior year. Penn was the Ivy League champion all three years.

As a sophomore forward, he averaged 14.6 points and 8.9 rebounds per game. Penn lost to Niagara and its star player Calvin Murphy (35 points) in the first round of the 1970 NCAA tournament, 79–69. Calhoun led the Quakers with 13 rebounds and was second with 15 points. Penn finished the season ranked No. 13 by the Associated Press. His teammates that year (and in his junior year) included, among others, future NBA guard Dave Wohl. He was selected the team's most valuable player that year.

As a junior, he averaged 10.1 points and a team-leading 8.6 rebounds per game. He was the team's most versatile player. During the regular season, he made a 22 ft (6.71 m) jump shot against Princeton as part of a Penn comeback that sent the game into overtime, with the Quakers winning to keep their undefeated streak alive. The Quakers defeated Duquesne in the first round of the 1971 NCAA tournament, 70–65, with Calhoun having 11 points and five rebounds. Penn then defeated South Carolina in the East Regional Semifinals, 79–64. Calhoun had 10 points and seven rebounds. Penn lost to Villanova in the East Regional Final, 90–47, their only loss of the year. They finished the season ranked No. 3 by the Associated Press.

As a senior, Calhoun averaged 13.5 points and 6.9 rebounds per game. He played guard as a senior to help the team after star guards Dave Wohl and Steve Bilsky graduated. After defeating Villanova on January 19, 1972, future Hall of Fame coach Chuck Daley awarded Calhoun the game ball for his excellent all-around play on offense (20 points) and defense. This was the first time in his 17 years of coaching Daley had ever awarded a game ball.

Penn defeated Providence in the first round of the 1972 NCAA tournament, 76–60. Calhoun had a team-leading 19 points and five assists, as well as six rebounds. Penn then defeated Villanova in the East Regional Semifinal, 78–67. Calhoun had 21 points and seven rebounds. Penn lost again in the East Regional Final, 73–59, to the University of North Carolina. Calhoun had seven points and seven rebounds in the game. Penn again finished the season ranked No. 3 by the Associated Press.

In 1972, Calhoun was named the Eastern College Athletic Conference Division I player of the year. He was All-Ivy League and All-Big Five three times each. As a senior in 1972, he shared the Robert V. Geasey Trophy with Villanova and future NBA player Chris Ford as the Philadelphia Big Five's Most Valuable Player.

== NBA career ==
Calhoun was selected by the Phoenix Suns in the 1972 NBA draft with the fourth overall pick and by the Kentucky Colonels in the first round of the 1972 American Basketball Association draft. Calhoun chose to play for the Suns.

=== Phoenix Suns and Los Angeles Lakers ===
In the 1972–73 season, Calhoun was the only Sun to play in all 82 games, and started some games. He played at small forward. Future Hall of Fame small forward Connie Hawkins was the starter. Calhoun averaged 24.7 minutes, six points and 4.1 rebounds per game. The following season, it was anticipated he could be a starter, and that his defensive mindedness would fit in with new head coach John MacLeod's playing philosophy. Calhoun began the season on October 10, starting at forward next to Hawkins. By the fifth game he did not start, but continued to play significant minutes as a reserve forward.

At the end of October the Suns traded Hawkins to the Los Angeles Lakers for small forward Keith Erickson (who had been holding out). Erickson started at small forward for the Suns, with Calhoun still averaging 28.7 minutes, 8.2 points, 5.3 rebounds and 1.8 assists per game that season. Erickson averaged 14.6 points per game, but the Suns relied on Calhoun for his defensive prowess. He appeared in 77 games that season, and underwent knee surgery after the season.

Calhoun played in 13 games for the Suns in the 1974–75 season, averaging less than nine minutes per game; and playing behind Erickson and Mike Bantom at small forward. In late November, the Suns traded Calhoun to the Los Angeles Lakers for future second- and third-round draft picks. With the Lakers, he played in 57 games, averaging 22.3 minutes, five points, 4.1 rebounds and 1.3 assists per game. The following season, he appeared in 76 games for the Lakers, averaging 23.9 minutes, 5.4 points, 4.5 rebounds and 1.1 assists per game.

=== Portland Trail Blazers and Indiana Pacers ===
The Lakers waived Calhoun in October 1976, and he joined the Portland Trail Blazers as a free agent. He appeared in 70 games for the Trail Blazers, averaging 10.6 minutes, 3.4 points and 2.1 rebounds per game. The team had 11 players averaging more than 10 minutes per game that season, with only two (Hall of Famer Bill Walton and Maurice Lucas) averaging more than 30 minutes per game.

The Trail Blazers were the 1976-77 NBA champions. In 12 playoff games, Calhoun averaged less than eight minutes, 2.3 points and 1.2 rebounds per game. In the six game finals victory over the Philadelphia 76ers, Calhoun played a significant role. He appeared in all six games, averaging nearly 11 minutes, 3.7 points and 1.7 rebounds per game. Blazers future Hall of Fame head coach Jack Ramsay stated that during their championship season, he knew he could rely upon Calhoun, "I always had confidence in him and knew he would be ready when he was called on".

Calhoun only played in one minute of Game 1 of the NBA finals, and six minutes in Game 2; both losses. Down 2–0 in the series, the Trail Blazers won Game 3, 129–107. Calhoun played 13 minutes in the game, and did well defensively against 76ers future Hall of Fame forward Julius Erving. He played 18 minutes in the Trail Blazers 130–98 Game 4 win over the 76ers, as part of a trio of players (with Bob Gross and Larry Steele) used to defend Erving. Calhoun also had six points, two rebounds, two assists and five personal fouls in that game. In Game 5, he played 19 minutes in the Trail Blazers 110–104 victory, with four points, four rebounds, one assist, one steal and four personal fouls. In the series winning Game 6, Calhoun played eight minutes in the Trail Blazers two point victory, scoring six points in the game. Late in Game 6, when the Sixers had come to within four points of taking the lead, Calhoun broke free and caught a full court pass, dunking the ball to extend the lead.

During the series, Portland assistant coach Jack McKinney called Calhoun the Trail Blazers best defensive player. Coach Ramsay later said of Calhoun's performance, "I think his major contribution for us in his two years was his play against Julius Erving (of Philadelphia) in the championship series. . . . He did a fine defensive job on Julius and that was the key to our championship". This was not the first time that Calhoun's defense on Erving had helped his team. In a January 17, 1970, game at Philadelphia's Palestra, Calhoun's Penn Quaker team defeated Erving's University of Massachusetts' team, 75–65. A key in that game was Calhoun's ability in the second half to keep Erving from driving to the basket, forcing him to take outside shots instead. Calhoun said he tried to defend Erving in the 1977 championship series as he had at Penn seven years earlier; by trying to cut him off from penetrating to the basket and forcing him toward the middle where other players could help out.

In 1977–78, he played in 79 games for Portland, averaging 17.3 minutes, 5.3 points, 2.7 rebounds, 1.1 assists and .5 steals per game. The Trail Blazers finished first in the NBA's Pacific Division (58–24), but lost in the first round of the playoffs to the Seattle SuperSonics. Calhoun averaged 18.2 minutes, 5.7 points and 2.3 rebounds per game in the playoffs.

In July 1978, Portland traded Calhoun to the Indiana Pacers for a 1980 second round draft choice. This completed an earlier trade where Portland sent Johnny Davis to Indiana for a No. 1 draft choice in the June 1978 draft (Mychal Thompson). In the 1978–79 season, he played in 81 games for the Pacers, averaging 16.4 minutes, 4.7 points, 2.9 rebounds and 1.3 assists per game. The Pacers waived Calhoun in early November the following season, after he played less than five minutes per game in only seven games that season.

Over his eight-year NBA career, Calhoun played in 542 regular season games, averaging 5.3 points, 3.6 rebounds and 1.1 assists per game. He had a 46% career shooting percentage.

== Legacy and honors ==
Portland Trail Blazers director of player personnel Stu Inman said, "The Corky Calhouns of the National Basketball Association are special . . . Corky always knew his role, accepted it and played it well. He was in sharp contrast to so many players who have such egos they don't even know who they are". As a player at all levels, he was known more for his defense than offense.

While at Penn, Calhoun was known for his character. Teammate Alan Cotler called him one of the pillars of Penn's team, along with Bob Morse (who went on to play basketball in Europe). Both were soft-spoken people who came to Penn to study as well as to play basketball. Cotler said "I can’t think of two people better suited to represent a university on and off the court". Penn teammate, and future NBA player, Phil Hankinson said of Calhoun, "He has pride. He has heart. But he has no ego".

After entering his first NBA contract, he donated a significant part of his signing bonus to the University of Pennsylvania.

In 1976, he was inducted into the Big Five Hall of Fame. In 1979, he was inducted into the Illinois Basketball Coaches Association Hall of Fame.

== Personal life ==
Calhoun considered playing in France after the NBA, but ultimately took a job offer from Mobil, where he worked as U.S. fuels marketing coordinator. He held a real estate license during his playing career.

== Career statistics ==
Legend
GP	Games played	GS	Games started	MPG	Minutes per game
FG%	Field goal percentage	3P%	3-point field goal percentage	FT%	Free throw percentage
RPG	Rebounds per game	APG	Assists per game	SPG	Steals per game
BPG	Blocks per game	PPG	Points per game	**Bold**	Career high
†	Won an NBA championship	*	Led the league

=== NBA ===
==== Regular season ====
Year	Team	GP	MPG	FG%	3P%	FT%	RPG	APG	SPG	BPG	PPG
1972–73	Phoenix	**82***	24.7	.469		.740	4.1	.9			6.0
1973–74	Phoenix	77	**28.7**	.461		.760	**5.3**	**1.8**	**.9**	.4	**8.2**
1974–75	Phoenix	13	8.3	.375		**.933**	2.5	.3	.5	.2	2.9
1974–75	L.A. Lakers	57	22.3	.420		.710	4.1	1.3	**.9**	.4	5.0
1975–76	L.A. Lakers	76	23.9	.467		.783	4.5	1.1	.8	**.5**	5.4
1976–77†	Portland	70	10.6	.464		.776	2.1	.5	.3	.1	3.4
1977–78	Portland	79	17.3	**.479**		.868	2.7	1.1	.5	.2	5.3
1978–79	Indiana	81	16.4	.457		.837	2.9	1.3	.5	.2	4.7
1979–80	Indiana	7	4.3	.444	–	.000	1.4	.0	.3	.0	1.1
Career		542	20.1	.460	–	.782	3.6	1.1	.6	.3	5.3

==== Playoffs ====
Year	Team	GP	MPG	FG%	FT%	RPG	APG	SPG	BPG	PPG
1977†	Portland	**12**	7.8	**.520**	**.667**	1.2	.3	**.3**	**.2**	2.3
1978	Portland	6	**18.2**	.517	.571	**2.3**	**.5**	**.3**	**.2**	**5.7**
Career		18	11.3	.519	.600	1.6	.4	.3	.2	3.4
