= 1974–75 Phoenix Suns season =

Professional basketball season

- Head coach: John MacLeod
- General manager: Jerry Colangelo
- Owners: Karl Eller, Don Pitt, Don Diamond, Bhavik Darji, Marvin Meyer, Richard L. Bloch
- Arena: Arizona Veterans Memorial Coliseum

Results
- Record: 32–50 (.390)
- Place: Division: 4th (Pacific); Conference: 8th (Western)
- Playoff finish: Did not qualify
- Stats at Basketball Reference

Local media
- Television: KTAR-TV
- Radio: KTAR

The 1974–75 Phoenix Suns season was the seventh season for the Phoenix Suns of the National Basketball Association. The Suns' roster averaged 2.8 years of professional experience, and included four one-year players in addition to three rookies. Coming off a 30–52 season, the Suns only improved by two games, finishing 32–50 under second-year head coach John MacLeod. All home games were played at Arizona Veterans Memorial Coliseum.

Coming off an All-Star season, guard/forward Charlie Scott led the Suns in both points and assists with averages of 24.3 and 4.5 a game. For Scott, it was the third and final NBA All-Star Game selection of his career. 31-year-old Dick Van Arsdale, the only player remaining from the Suns' inaugural season roster, was second in scoring with a 16.1 average. Fourth-year forward Curtis Perry enjoyed his first season with Phoenix, posting career-highs in both points and rebounds, averaging 13.4 points and a team-high 11.9 rebounds per game.

== Offseason ==
=== NBA draft ===
Round	Pick	Player	Position	Nationality	College
1	4	John Shumate	Forward	United States	Notre Dame
2	31	Fred Saunders	Forward	United States	Syracuse
3	40	George Gervin	Guard	United States	Eastern Michigan
3	49	Earl Williams	Center	United States	Winston-Salem State
4	58	Randy Allen	Guard	United States	Indiana (PA)
5	76	Ralph Bobik	Guard	United States	Creighton
6	94	Collis Temple	Forward	United States	Louisiana State
7	112	Clyde Dickey	Guard	United States	Boise State
8	130	Tom Holland	Forward	United States	Oklahoma
9	148	Ted Evans	Forward	United States	Oklahoma
10	165	Mark Wasley	Forward	United States	Arizona State

== Roster ==
1974–75 Phoenix Suns roster
Players

Pos.	No.	Player	Height	Weight	DOB	From
C	21	Dennis Awtrey	6 ft 10 in (2.08 m)	235 lb (107 kg)	1948-02-22	Santa Clara
F/C	40	Mike Bantom	6 ft 9 in (2.06 m)	200 lb (91 kg)	1951-12-03	Saint Joseph's
G/F	14	Keith Erickson (injured)	6 ft 5 in (1.96 m)	195 lb (88 kg)	1944-04-19	UCLA
G	32	Nate Hawthorne	6 ft 4 in (1.93 m)	190 lb (86 kg)	1950-01-15	Southern Illinois
G	24	Greg Jackson	6 ft 0 in (1.83 m)	180 lb (82 kg)	1952-08-02	Guilford
G	25	Gary Melchionni	6 ft 2 in (1.88 m)	185 lb (84 kg)	1951-01-19	Duke
G/F	45	Jim Owens	6 ft 5 in (1.96 m)	200 lb (91 kg)	1950-05-01	Arizona State
F	18	Curtis Perry	6 ft 7 in (2.01 m)	220 lb (100 kg)	1948-09-13	Missouri State
F	30	Fred Saunders	6 ft 7 in (2.01 m)	210 lb (95 kg)	1951-06-13	Syracuse
G	33	Charlie Scott	6 ft 5 in (1.96 m)	175 lb (79 kg)	1948-12-15	North Carolina
F/C	34	John Shumate (injured) (IN)	6 ft 9 in (2.06 m)	235 lb (107 kg)	1952-04-06	Notre Dame
G/F	5	Dick Van Arsdale	6 ft 5 in (1.96 m)	210 lb (95 kg)	1943-02-22	Indiana
F/C	55	Earl Williams	6 ft 7 in (2.01 m)	230 lb (104 kg)	1951-03-24	Winston-Salem State

Coaches
Head coach
- John MacLeod (Bellarmine)
Assistant(s)
- Denny Price (Oklahoma)

Legend
- (DP) Unsigned draft pick
- (FA) Free agent
- (S) Suspended
- Injured

== Regular season ==
=== Standings ===
Pacific Division	W	L	PCT	GB	Home	Road	Div
y-Golden State Warriors	48	34	.585	–	31–10	17–24	19–11
x-Seattle SuperSonics	43	39	.524	5	24–16	19–23	18–12
Portland Trail Blazers	38	44	.463	10	29–13	9–31	16–14
Phoenix Suns	32	50	.390	16	22–19	10–31	12–18
Los Angeles Lakers	30	52	.366	18	21–20	9–32	10–20

#	Western Conference				
#	Team	W	L	PCT	GB
1	z-Golden State Warriors	48	34	.585	–
2	y-Chicago Bulls	47	35	.573	1
3	x-Kansas City–Omaha Kings	44	38	.537	4
4	x-Seattle SuperSonics	43	39	.524	5
5	x-Detroit Pistons	40	42	.488	8
6	Portland Trail Blazers	38	44	.463	10
6	Milwaukee Bucks	38	44	.463	10
8	Phoenix Suns	32	50	.390	16
9	Los Angeles Lakers	30	52	.366	18

=== Game log ===
1974–75 game log
Total: 32–50 (home: 22–19; road: 10–31)
October: 3–3 (home: 2–1; road: 1–2)

Game	Date	Team	Score	High points	Location Attendance	Record	Streak
1	October 17	Seattle	W 114–97	Charlie Scott (32)	Arizona Veterans Memorial Coliseum; 7,215	1–0	W 1
2	October 19	Kansas City-Omaha	L 91–94	Charlie Scott (22)	Arizona Veterans Memorial Coliseum; 5,377	1–1	L 1
3	October 23	Detroit	W 100–90	Charlie Scott (23)	Arizona Veterans Memorial Coliseum; 5,924	2–1	W 1
4	October 25	@ Seattle	L 97–106	Gary Melchionni (20)	Seattle Center Coliseum; 12,191	2–2	L 1
5	October 27	@ Los Angeles	L 116–123	Keith Erickson (29)	The Forum; 10,579	2–3	L 2
6	October 30	@ Philadelphia	W 104–99	Charlie Scott (27)	The Spectrum; 5,089	3–3	W 1

November: 6–9 (home: 3–3; road: 3–6)

Game	Date	Team	Score	High points	Location Attendance	Record	Streak
7	November 2	@ Washington	L 94–108	Charlie Scott (28)	Capital Centre; 9,160	3–4	L 1
8	November 3	@ Cleveland	L 101–104	Keith Erickson (19)	Coliseum at Richfield; 7,354	3–5	L 2
9	November 7	@ Atlanta	L 108–109	Charlie Scott (31)	Omni Coliseum; 2,847	3–6	L 3
10	November 8	@ New Orleans	W 105–102	Charlie Scott (34)	Municipal Auditorium; 3,118	4–6	W 1
11	November 9	@ Houston	W 101–96	Charlie Scott (32)	Hofheinz Pavilion; 2,553	5–6	W 2
12	November 13	Philadelphia	W 105–100	Charlie Scott (41)	Arizona Veterans Memorial Coliseum; 5,071	6–6	W 3
13	November 15	Chicago	L 95–102	Charlie Scott (26)	Arizona Veterans Memorial Coliseum; 7,071	6–7	L 1
14	November 17	Golden State	L 105–106	Charlie Scott (32)	Arizona Veterans Memorial Coliseum; 7,820	6–8	L 2
15	November 19	@ Milwaukee	L 108–122	Charlie Scott (32)	MECCA Arena; 9,187	6–9	L 3
16	November 20	@ Detroit	W 114–106	Charlie Scott (33)	Cobo Arena; 3,807	7–9	W 1
17	November 22	@ Boston	L 94–95	Charlie Scott (27)	Boston Garden; 13,756	7–10	L 1
18	November 23	@ Buffalo	L 104–117	Charlie Scott (23)	Buffalo Memorial Auditorium; 12,743	7–11	L 2
19	November 26	New Orleans Jazz	W 120–110	Charlie Scott (31)	Arizona Veterans Memorial Coliseum; 4,931	8–11	W 1
20	November 28	Portland	L 85–88	Charlie Scott (27)	Arizona Veterans Memorial Coliseum; 6,461	8–12	L 1
21	November 30	Houston	W 112–100	Gary Melchionni (21)	Arizona Veterans Memorial Coliseum; 5,187	9–12	W 1

December: 6–6 (home: 6–3; road: 0–3)

Game	Date	Team	Score	High points	Location Attendance	Record	Streak
22	December 1	@ Los Angeles	L 105–111 (OT)	Charlie Scott (26)	The Forum; 10,157	9–13	L 1
23	December 3	Atlanta	L 85–91	Charlie Scott (24)	Arizona Veterans Memorial Coliseum; 4,019	9–14	L 2
24	December 5	Golden State	W 108–106 (2OT)	Charlie Scott (24)	Arizona Veterans Memorial Coliseum; 6,053	10–14	W 1
25	December 7	Los Angeles	W 92–88	Charlie Scott (25)	Arizona Veterans Memorial Coliseum; 5,603	11–14	W 2
26	December 8	@ Los Angeles	L 102–107	Charlie Scott (28)	The Forum; 11,124	11–15	L 1
27	December 11	Portland	W 104–100	Keith Erickson (26)	Arizona Veterans Memorial Coliseum; 4,768	12–15	W 1
28	December 13	Cleveland	W 85–84	Charlie Scott (34)	Arizona Veterans Memorial Coliseum; 5,756	13–15	W 2
29	December 19	Milwaukee	L 108–112	Keith Erickson (22)	Arizona Veterans Memorial Coliseum; 7,369	13–16	L 1
30	December 21	Los Angeles	W 114–104	Keith Erickson (25)	Arizona Veterans Memorial Coliseum; 5,437	14–16	W 1
31	December 23	@ Golden State	L 94–111	Keith Erickson, Charlie Scott (20)	Oakland–Alameda County Coliseum Arena; 5,240	14–17	L 1
32	December 25	Boston	W 110–96	Charlie Scott (30)	Arizona Veterans Memorial Coliseum; 8,276	15–17	W 1
33	December 27	Buffalo	L 92–108	Charlie Scott, Dick Van Arsdale (17)	Arizona Veterans Memorial Coliseum; 9,205	15–18	L 1

January: 5–9 (home: 3–4; road: 2–5)

Game	Date	Team	Score	High points	Location Attendance	Record	Streak
34	January 2	@ New York	L 113–117 (OT)	Charlie Scott (30)	Madison Square Garden; 18,570	15–19	L 2
35	January 3	@ Chicago	L 99–126	Mike Bantom (20)	Chicago Stadium; 6,047	15–20	L 3
36	January 5	@ Cleveland	L 86–97	Dennis Awtrey, Gary Melchionni (15)	Coliseum at Richfield; 6,138	15–21	L 4
37	January 8	Washington	L 95–102	Charlie Scott (26)	Arizona Veterans Memorial Coliseum; 6,770	15–22	L 5
38	January 10	Portland	L 110–113	Charlie Scott (24)	Arizona Veterans Memorial Coliseum; 5,068	15–23	L 6
39	January 11	New York	W 113–107	Mike Bantom (29)	Arizona Veterans Memorial Coliseum; 7,592	16–23	W 1
All-Star Break
40	January 17	@ Chicago	W 115–105	Charlie Scott (31)	Chicago Stadium; 7,174	17–23	W 2
41	January 18	@ Detroit	L 77–86	Mike Bantom (19)	Cobo Arena; 6,053	17–24	L 1
42	January 19	@ Kansas City-Omaha	W 109–97	Charlie Scott (28)	Kemper Arena; 13,155	18–24	W 1
43	January 21	Philadelphia	L 95–101	Charlie Scott (34)	Arizona Veterans Memorial Coliseum; 4,267	18–25	L 1
44	January 25	New Orleans	W 94–90 (OT)	Charlie Scott (23)	Arizona Veterans Memorial Coliseum; 5,872	19–25	W 1
45	January 28	@ Portland	L 107–115	Mike Bantom, Charlie Scott (24)	Memorial Coliseum; 10,291	19–26	L 1
46	January 29	Seattle	L 85–99	Charlie Scott (25)	Arizona Veterans Memorial Coliseum; 4,273	19–27	L 2
47	January 31	Los Angeles	W 105–101	Curtis Perry (24)	Arizona Veterans Memorial Coliseum; 5,871	20–27	W 1

February: 8–6 (home: 5–2; road: 3–4)

Game	Date	Team	Score	High points	Location Attendance	Record	Streak
48	February 4	Washington	W 90–89	Dick Van Arsdale (30)	Arizona Veterans Memorial Coliseum; 4,263	21–27	W 2
49	February 5	@ Seattle	W 107–102	Dick Van Arsdale (46)	Seattle Center Coliseum; 10,002	22–27	W 3
50	February 6	Seattle	W 112–105	Mike Bantom (26)	Arizona Veterans Memorial Coliseum; 5,865	23–27	W 4
51	February 8	@ Golden State	L 96–105	Dick Van Arsdale (27)	Oakland–Alameda County Coliseum Arena; 8,961	23–28	L 1
52	February 12	Buffalo	W 108–96	Charlie Scott (25)	Arizona Veterans Memorial Coliseum; 6,255	24–28	W 1
53	February 14	Boston	L 106–112	Dick Van Arsdale (25)	Arizona Veterans Memorial Coliseum; 9,338	24–29	L 1
54	February 15	Atlanta	L 107–111	Curtis Perry (26)	Arizona Veterans Memorial Coliseum; 6,147	24–30	L 2
55	February 18	@ Buffalo	L 109–124	Charlie Scott (32)	Maple Leaf Gardens; 8,163	24–31	L 3
56	February 19	@ Washington	L 97–120	Dick Van Arsdale (20)	Capital Centre; 6,201	24–32	L 4
57	February 21	@ New Orleans	L 96–98	Gary Melchionni (17)	Municipal Auditorium; 4,563	24–33	L 5
58	February 23	@ Milwaukee	W 106–97	Dennis Awtrey (24)	Dane County Coliseum; 8,832	25–33	W 1
59	February 25	@ Golden State	W 111–97	Charlie Scott (26)	Oakland–Alameda County Coliseum Arena; 8,550	26–33	W 2
60	February 26	Cleveland	W 108–96	Charlie Scott (24)	Arizona Veterans Memorial Coliseum; 5,447	27–33	W 3
61	February 28	Golden State	W 102–96	Dick Van Arsdale (25)	Arizona Veterans Memorial Coliseum; 9,511	28–33	W 4

March: 3–15 (home: 2–5; road: 1–10)

Game	Date	Team	Score	High points	Location Attendance	Record	Streak
62	March 2	@ Houston	L 104–110	Charlie Scott (26)	Hofheinz Pavilion; 4,827	28–34	L 1
63	March 4	@ Kansas City-Omaha	L 99–103	Mike Bantom (23)	Omaha Civic Auditorium; 4,027	28–35	L 2
64	March 6	Chicago	W 88–65	Mike Bantom (16)	Arizona Veterans Memorial Coliseum; 7,683	29–35	W 1
65	March 7	@ Portland	L 98–120	Mike Bantom (28)	Arizona Veterans Memorial Coliseum; 10,080	29–36	L 1
66	March 8	Houston	L 107–112		Arizona Veterans Memorial Coliseum; 5,272	29–37	L 2
67	March 11	@ New York	L 98–103	Charlie Scott (30)	Madison Square Garden; 17,443	29–38	L 3
68	March 12	@ Boston	L 82–88	Nate Hawthorne (20)	Hartford Civic Center; 11,283	29–39	L 4
69	March 14	@ Philadelphia	L 97–108	Mike Bantom (19)	The Spectrum; 7,127	29–40	L 5
70	March 16	@ Atlanta	L 114–117	Charlie Scott (38)	Omni Coliseum; 2,786	29–41	L 6
71	March 18	@ Golden State	L 103–133	Mike Bantom (26)	Oakland–Alameda County Coliseum Arena; 6,795	29–42	L 7
72	March 19	New York	L 96–101	Curtis Perry (22)	Arizona Veterans Memorial Coliseum; 5,492	29–43	L 8
73	March 21	Portland	L 108–112	Dick Van Arsdale (26)	Arizona Veterans Memorial Coliseum; 4,786	29–44	L 9
74	March 22	@ Portland	L 92–94	Curtis Perry (18)	Memorial Coliseum; 11,142	29–45	L 10
75	March 23	@ Seattle	W 102–96	Mike Bantom (22)	Seattle Center Coliseum; 14,082	30–45	W 1
76	March 25	Milwaukee	W 92–87	Charlie Scott (22)	Arizona Veterans Memorial Coliseum; 7,232	31–45	W 2
77	March 27	Detroit	L 79–91	Charlie Scott (19)	Arizona Veterans Memorial Coliseum; 5,629	31–46	L 1
78	March 29	Kansas City-Omaha	L 100–104	Dennis Awtrey, Curtis Perry (20)	Arizona Veterans Memorial Coliseum; 6,450	31–47	L 2
79	March 30	@ Los Angeles	L 90–104	Mike Bantom (20)	The Forum; 8,546	31–48	L 3

April: 1–2 (home: 1–1; road: 0–1)

Game	Date	Team	Score	High points	Location Attendance	Record	Streak
80	April 2	Los Angeles	W 108–106	Charlie Scott (25)	Arizona Veterans Memorial Coliseum; 5,610	32–48	W 1
81	April 4	Golden State	L 99–128	Mike Bantom (22)	Arizona Veterans Memorial Coliseum; 6,867	32–49	L 1
82	April 6	@ Seattle	L 111–114	Charlie Scott (25)	Seattle Center Coliseum; 14,082	32–50	L 2

1974–75 schedule

== Awards and honors ==
=== All-Star ===
- Charlie Scott was selected as a reserve for the Western Conference in the All-Star Game, which was played in Phoenix for the first time. Scott finished third in voting among Western Conference guards with 40,736 votes. It was his third consecutive All-Star selection.
- Other Suns players who received All-Star votes were Keith Erickson (23,171), Curtis Perry (22,574), and Dick Van Arsdale (19,395).

=== Season ===
- Mike Bantom finished 14th in MVP voting.

== Player statistics ==
Legend
GP	Games played	GS	Games started	MPG	Minutes per game
FG%	Field-goal percentage	FT%	Free-throw percentage	RPG	Rebounds per game
APG	Assists per game	SPG	Steals per game	BPG	Blocks per game
PPG	Points per game

=== Season ===
Player	GP	GS	MPG	FG%	FT%	RPG	APG	SPG	BPG	PPG
Dennis Awtrey	82	73	34.6	.470	.677	8.6	4.2	.7	.6	9.9
Mike Bantom	82	50	27.3	.461	.714	6.7	1.9	.8	.6	12.5
Corky Calhoun*	13	0	8.3	.375	.933^	2.5	0.3	.5	.2	2.9
Keith Erickson	49	24	30.0	.425	.833^	5.0	3.5	1.0	.2	12.3
Nate Hawthorne	50	2	12.4	.411	.649	1.8	0.8	.6	.4	5.9
Greg Jackson	44	18	17.6	.416	.581	1.5	2.1	.5	.2	4.0
Gary Melchionni	68	29	22.5	.430	.809	2.8	2.3	.7	.2	8.5
Jim Owens	41	5	10.5	.386	.750	1.0	1.2	.4	.0	3.0
Curtis Perry	79	78	34.0	.477	.719	11.9	2.4	1.4	1.0	13.4
Fred Saunders	69	12	15.3	.433	.695	3.7	1.2	.6	.2	6.1
Charlie Scott	69	60	37.6	.441	.781	4.0	4.5	1.6	.3	24.3
Dick Van Arsdale	70	50	34.6	.470	.832	2.7	2.8	1.2	.2	16.1
Earl Williams	79	9	13.2	.414	.437	5.8	1.2	.4	.4	4.7

* – Stats with the Suns.
^ – Minimum 125 free throws made.

== Transactions ==
=== Trades ===
September 6, 1974	To Washington Bullets (United States) Clem Haskins	To Phoenix Suns (United States) Dave Stallworth 1975 second-round draft pick ( (United States) Allen Murphy)
September 16, 1974	To New Orleans Jazz (United States) Neal Walk 1975 second-round draft pick ( (United States) Clyde Mayes)	To Phoenix Suns (United States) Dennis Awtrey (United States) Nate Hawthorne (United States) Curtis Perry 1976 first-round draft pick ( (United States) Adrian Dantley)
November 27, 1974	To Los Angeles Lakers (United States) Corky Calhoun	To Phoenix Suns 1976 second-round draft pick ( (United States) Jacky Dorsey) 1977 third-round draft pick ( (United States) Mike Bratz)

=== Free agents ===
==== Additions ====
Date	Player	Contract	Old Team
January 2, 1975	Greg Jackson	Undisclosed	New York Knicks

==== Subtractions ====
Date	Player	Reason left	New team
May 20, 1974	Lamar Green	Expansion draft	New Orleans Jazz
July 31, 1974	Bob Christian	Waived	New York Knicks
September 24, 1974	Bill Chamberlain	Waived	—N/a (Retired)
October 10, 1974	Dave Stallworth	Waived	New York Knicks
