= Keith Erickson =

American basketball & volleyball player

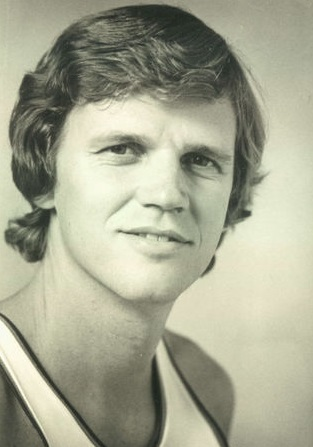
- Erickson in 1976

Personal information
- Born: April 19, 1944 (age 82) San Francisco, California, U.S.
- Listed height: 6 ft 5 in (1.96 m)
- Listed weight: 195 lb (88 kg)

Career information
- High school: El Segundo (El Segundo, California)
- College: El Camino College (1961–1962); UCLA (1962–1965)
- NBA draft: 1965: 3rd round, 18th overall pick
- Drafted by: San Francisco Warriors
- Playing career: 1965–1977
- Position: Small forward / shooting guard
- Number: 18, 15, 24, 14

Career history
- 1965–1966: San Francisco Warriors
- 1966–1968: Chicago Bulls
- 1968–1973: Los Angeles Lakers
- 1973–1977: Phoenix Suns

Career highlights
- NBA champion (1972); 2× NCAA champion (1964, 1965); Third-team All-American – AP, UPI (1965); First-team All-AAWU (1965)

Career NBA statistics
- Points: 7,251 (9.5 ppg)
- Rebounds: 3,449 (4.5 rpg)
- Assists: 1,991 (2.6 apg)
- Stats at NBA.com
- Stats at Basketball Reference

Keith Raymond Erickson (born April 19, 1944) is an American former basketball and volleyball player. He played on two National Collegiate Athletic Association (NCAA) championship teams at the University of California at Los Angeles (UCLA) under head coach John Wooden, where he was the key player in the team's zone-press defense. He was a member of the United States Men's Olympic Volleyball Team in the 1964 Olympics. He played 12 years in the National Basketball Association (NBA), participating in four NBA Finals series, and missing a fifth because of injury.

== Early life ==
Erickson was born on April 19, 1944, in San Francisco. Erickson attended El Segundo High School (California), where he was on the basketball team in his senior year. As a senior (1960-61), Erickson was selected second-team All-Pioneer League in basketball. He was an All-Star baseball player at shortstop for El Segundo as well. Among his baseball teammates was future Major League Baseball player Bobby Floyd. In 1961, his baseball team won the Pioneer League Championship and came in second in the California Interscholastic Federation (CIF) playoffs.

After graduating high school, Erickson attended El Camino Junior College. After leaving high school at a young age (17), he believed El Camino prepared him to go to a larger school, and he had no regrets about not going to a larger college or university right away out of high school. He also needed to improve his grades out of high school to be able to attend a school like the University of California at Los Angeles (UCLA). He played center on the basketball team at El Camino (1961-62). He also played on the school's baseball team.

== College ==
Erickson transferred to UCLA for his 1962-63 sophomore year, after it was the only school to offer him a scholarship. He received a half-baseball half-basketball scholarship. He played basketball at UCLA for three years under Naismith Hall of Fame coach John Wooden. As a sophomore he averaged five points and 6.1 rebounds per game; 10.7 points and 9.1 rebounds per game as a junior; and 12.9 points and 8.8 rebounds per game as a senior. Playing forward, the 6 ft 5 in (1.96 m) Erickson called the signals for UCLA's zone-press defense. His role in UCLA's press defense is his most important legacy to the team's success.

In Erickson's junior year, the 1963-64 UCLA team had a perfect 30–0 record. Erickson's teammates included two future NBA guards: Naismith Hall of Fame guard Gail Goodrich and NBA All-Star Walt Hazzard. The Bruins won the NCAA National Championship Game over Duke, 98–83. Erickson had eight points and five rebounds in the championship game.

Erickson played a key role in UCLA's reaching the championship. In the West Regional Final of the NCAA Tournament, against the University of San Francisco, he led the Bruins with 10 rebounds. In the National Semifinals (Final Four), UCLA defeated Kansas State University, 90–84. During that game, the Bruins had surrendered two first half leads and then fallen behind in the second half, as some of the team underperformed. Erickson, however, stepped up and led the Bruins with 28 points (17 points above his scoring average) and 10 rebounds in saving the victory.

The Bruins were National Champions again in 1965, with a 28–2 record, and a championship game victory over the University of Michigan, 91–80. Erickson had 28 points and nine rebounds in UCLA's 100–76 victory over Brigham Young University in the Western Region Semifinals. He had 29 points and 11 rebounds in the Western Region Final win over San Francisco, 101–93. However, Erickson had an injured leg muscle and only scored two points in each of the last two games of the 1965 NCAA Tournament; though UCLA still won. He had been bothered by a groin injury throughout the season.

The Associated Press (AP) selected Erickson as a third-team All-American in his senior year (1965).

Erickson also played baseball at UCLA. Coach Wooden would later remark that Erickson was the finest athlete he ever coached.

== 1964 Olympics ==
Erickson played on the 1964 United States Olympic volleyball team in Tokyo.

== Professional career ==
In 1965, Erickson was selected by the San Francisco Warriors in the third round of the NBA draft, 21st overall. Erickson played for the Warriors, Chicago Bulls, the 1972 NBA Champion Los Angeles Lakers, and Phoenix Suns.

=== San Francisco Warriors and Chicago Bulls ===
As a Warriors rookie, Erickson averaged 3.6 points and 2.5 rebounds, playing 10 minutes per game. The Warriors did not protect Erickson in the 1966 expansion draft, and he was selected by the Chicago Bulls. During the Bulls' 1966-67 inaugural season, Erickson split time at small forward with Don Kojis, averaging 7.7 points, 4.5 rebounds and 1.6 assists in 19 minutes per game. He became the team's starting small forward in 1967-68, averaging 12.2 points, 5.4 rebounds and 3.4 assists in nearly 29 minutes per game.

=== Los Angeles Lakers ===
Erickson held out before the 1968-69 season, and would not report to the Bulls' training camp. On September 23, 1968, he was traded to the Lakers for Erwin Mueller. This was also future Hall of Fame center Wilt Chamberlain's first year with the Lakers, on a team that included two other future Hall of Fame players, Elgin Baylor and Jerry West. The Lakers won the NBA's Western Division with a 55–27 record.

During the regular season, Erickson played guard for the Lakers, and averaged 8.4 points, four rebounds and 2.5 assists in 25.6 minutes a game. The Lakers won the Western Division Semifinals over the Warriors, four-games-to-two, and the Western Division Finals over the Atlanta Hawks (and old UCLA teammate Walt Hazzard), four-games-to-one. Erickson averaged over 27 minutes a game against the Warriors (8.2 points/4.7 rebounds/2.3 assists per game), but played less against the Hawks.

The Lakers lost the 1969 NBA Finals four-games-to-three against the Boston Celtics. Celtics future Hall of Famer John Havlicek was the Celtics top scorer in the series. In Game 5, Lakers coach Butch Van Breda Kolff started Erickson as a forward to defend against Havlicek, after Erickson had stopped Havlicek from scoring during the fourth quarter of Game 4. Erickson held Havlicek to six points through three quarters in Game 5, and the Lakers won the game, 117–104. The Lakers had a three-games-to-two lead in the series, but then lost the final two games of the series in Boston. Havlicek, who averaged over 28 points per game in the series, only had 19 points in Game 6, but had 26 in the Celtics 108–106 victory in Game 7.

The 1969-70 Lakers went to the NBA Finals again in 1970, losing to the New York Knicks in seven games. During the season, Erickson averaged nearly nine points, with 4.5 rebounds and 3.1 assists in nearly 26 minutes per game. Erickson averaged nearly 25 minutes per game in the Western Division Semifinals against the Phoenix Suns, and 33 minutes per game against the Hawks in the Western Division Finals.

Erickson averaged nearly 39 minutes per game in the finals against the Knicks (11.6 points/4.4 rebounds/4.7 assists per game). Erickson was matched up against Knicks future Hall of Fame forward Bill Bradley, and proved to have the advantage in that matchup at times during the series. He had 19 points in a 111–108 Game 3 loss, 14 points and nine rebounds in 121–115 Game 4 win, and 14 points, six rebounds and six assists in the Game 7 loss.

The 1970-71 Lakers lost to the eventual champion Milwaukee Bucks in the 1971 Western Conference Finals. Starting at small forward, Erickson played a career-high 31.1 minutes per game that season, averaging 11.3 points, 5.5 rebounds and 3.1 assists per game. Small forward Elgin Baylor played in only two games that year, after suffering an Achilles tendon injury (and would only play nine more games the next season before retiring). Erickson himself only played one game in the April 1971 Milwaukee series, as he developed appendicitis and had to have surgery.

Erickson later had surgery for tendonitis on his left knee, and did not play again until January 25, 1972. He played in only 15 games during the 1971-72 season, averaging 17.5 minutes per game. The team had a 69–13 record, and won the 1972 NBA Championship, but Erickson did not play in the playoffs that season, his last game being on March 21. During that game, he injured his right knee so severely that it ended his season.

Erickson came back with the Lakers for the 1972-73 season, in the role of sixth man. He averaged 25.3 minutes, with nine points, 4.4 rebounds and 3.2 assists per game. The team was 60–22 and reached the NBA Finals again, losing to the Knicks in five games.

After playing with Gail Goodrich for three seasons at UCLA (1962-65), Goodrich and Erickson were Lakers teammates for another three seasons (1970-73).

=== Phoenix Suns ===
Erickson was traded along with a 1974 second-round selection (31st overall–Fred Saunders) from the Lakers to the Suns for Connie Hawkins on October 30, 1973. In his first season with the Suns, Erickson averaged career-highs with 14.6 points and 6.3 rebounds per game. During the 1974-75 season, Erickson played in only 49 games. He suffered a back injury in January 1975 that caused him to miss games in January and February. After trying to return, his last game of the season came on March 6.

During the 1975-76 season, Erickson played in 74 games, his most as a Sun. It was also the first and only time the Suns reached the playoffs during Erickson's tenure with the team, going all the way to the NBA Finals where they lost to the Boston Celtics in six games. Erickson played small forward, averaging 10.1 points, 4.5 rebounds and 2.5 assists in 25 minutes per game during the season. He averaged 16.7 points per game against the Seattle SuperSonics in the Western Conference Semifinals, in only 25.3 minutes per game. He scored 31 points in the Suns' Game 4 win, 130–114, and 20 points in the series-clinching Game 6 victory.

The Suns won the seven game 1976 Western Conference Finals over the Golden State Warriors. Erickson averaged 13.3 points, 4.1 rebounds and 2.4 assists in 25.1 minutes per game during the series. With the Suns down two-games-to-three in the series, Erickson came off the bench to lead the team in scoring with 24 points in a 105–104 Game 6 win. He scored 16 of his 24 points in the second half, mostly on long jump shots, in sparking the Suns to overcome a first half deficit.

He averaged only 16.3 minutes per game in the NBA Finals against the Celtics, with Curtis Perry starting at forward ahead of him, and Dick Van Arsdale being the sixth man off the bench.

The 1976-77 Suns season was Erickson's final year in the NBA. He suffered a partial tear of the medial collateral ligament in his left knee, and did not play between November 28, 1976 and January 28, 1977. Erickson returned in late January and finished out the season with the Suns, averaging 6.4 points, 2.9 rebounds, and 2.1 assists in 19 minutes per game. He became a free agent at the end of the season, but was not signed by another team.

=== Career ===
Over his 12-year career, Erickson had 7,251 points and 3,449 rebounds, averaging 9.5 points and 4.5 rebounds per game. He averaged 10 points, 4.4 rebounds and 2.5 assists in 87 playoff games.

== Broadcaster ==
He later served as color commentator for the Los Angeles Lakers with Naismith Hall of Fame broadcaster Chick Hearn, the Los Angeles Clippers, the Phoenix Suns, and The NBA on CBS with Pro Football Hall of Fame and Sports Broadcasting Hall of Fame play-by-play man Brent Musburger.

== Legacy and honors ==
John Wooden "called Keith Erickson the 'finest all-around team defensive star' he coached at UCLA". In 1994, UCLA teammate Walt Hazard said Erickson "'was the finest all-around athlete I've ever been associated with'".

He was inducted into the UCLA Athletics Hall of Fame in 1986, and was inducted into the Pac-12 Conference Men's Basketball Hall of Honor during the 2016 Pac-12 Conference men's basketball tournament. In 2022, he was inducted into the Southern California Basketball Hall of Fame.

== Career statistics ==
Legend
GP	Games played	GS	Games started	MPG	Minutes per game
FG%	Field goal percentage	3P%	3-point field goal percentage	FT%	Free throw percentage
RPG	Rebounds per game	APG	Assists per game	SPG	Steals per game
BPG	Blocks per game	PPG	Points per game	**Bold**	Career high
†	Won an NBA championship	*	Led the league

=== NBA ===
==== Regular season ====
Year	Team	GP	MPG	FG%	FT%	RPG	APG	SPG	BPG	PPG
1965–66	San Francisco	64	10.1	.356	.662	2.5	.6			3.6
1966–67	Chicago	76	19.1	.367	.736	4.5	1.6			7.7
1967–68	Chicago	**78**	28.9	.401	.755	5.4	3.4			12.2
1968–69	L.A. Lakers	77	25.6	.420	.686	4.0	2.5			8.4
1969–70	L.A. Lakers	68	25.8	.458	.746	4.5	3.1			8.9
1970–71	L.A. Lakers	73	**31.1**	.471	.759	5.5	3.1			11.3
1971–72†	L.A. Lakers	15	17.5	.482	**.857**	2.6	2.3			5.7
1972–73	L.A. Lakers	76	25.3	.430	.809	4.4	3.2			9.0
1973–74	Phoenix	66	30.8	.477	.801	**6.3**	3.1	1.0	**.3**	**14.6**
1974–75	Phoenix	49	30.0	.425	.833	5.0	**3.5**	1.0	.2	12.3
1975–76	Phoenix	74	25.0	.470	.854	4.5	2.5	**1.1**	.1	10.1
1976–77	Phoenix	50	19.0	**.483**	.740	2.9	2.1	.6	.1	6.4
Career		766	24.6	.435	.769	4.5	2.6	.9	.2	9.5

==== Playoffs ====
Year	Team	GP	MPG	FG%	FT%	RPG	APG	SPG	BPG	PPG
1967	Chicago	3	22.7	.444	–	3.7	1.3			8.0
1968	Chicago	5	36.6	.385	**.882**	**8.2**	2.2			13.0
1969	L.A. Lakers	18*	24.8	.394	.600	4.8	2.2			7.0
1970	L.A. Lakers	17	32.5	.464	.771	4.5	**4.4**			9.9
1971	L.A. Lakers	8	**39.1**	**.545**	.773	5.6	2.8			**15.6**
1973	L.A. Lakers	17*	23.8	.449	.682	3.5	1.8			8.6
1976	Phoenix	**19***	22.4	.462	.809	3.5	1.8	.6	.2	11.3
Career		87	27.5	.452	.762	4.4	2.5	.6	.2	10.0
