= Jim Owens (basketball, born 1950) =

American basketball player

Personal information
- Born: May 1, 1950 (age 76) Los Angeles, California, U.S.
- Listed height: 6 ft 5 in (1.96 m)
- Listed weight: 200 lb (91 kg)

Career information
- High school: South Torrance (Los Angeles, California)
- College: Arizona State (1969–1973)
- NBA draft: 1973: 8th round, 128th overall pick
- Drafted by: Phoenix Suns
- Position: Small forward
- Number: 45

Career history
- 1973–1975: Phoenix Suns
- Stats at NBA.com
- Stats at Basketball Reference

James Owens (born May 1, 1950) is an American former professional basketball player. He played in the National Basketball Association for the Phoenix Suns during the 1973–74 and 1974–75 seasons. Owens was selected by the Suns in the 1973 NBA draft as the 128th overall pick. For his career he averaged 3.1 points per game in 58 games played.

== Career statistics ==
Legend
GP	Games played	GS	Games started	MPG	Minutes per game
FG%	Field goal percentage	3P%	3-point field goal percentage	FT%	Free throw percentage
RPG	Rebounds per game	APG	Assists per game	SPG	Steals per game
BPG	Blocks per game	PPG	Points per game	**Bold**	Career high

=== NBA ===
==== Regular season ====
Year	Team	GP	MPG	FG%	FT%	RPG	APG	SPG	BPG	PPG
1973-74	Phoenix	17	5.9	**.538**	**.786**	.5	.9	.3	.0	**3.1**
1974-75	Phoenix	**41**	**10.5**	.386	.750	**1.0**	**1.3**	**.4**	.0	3.0
Career		58	9.2	.418	.767	.9	1.1	.4	.0	3.1
