= Dick Van Arsdale =

American basketball player (1943–2024)

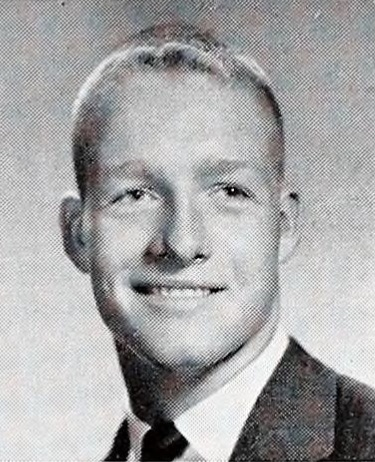
- Van Arsdale in 1961

Personal information
- Born: February 22, 1943 Indianapolis, Indiana, U.S.
- Died: December 16, 2024 (aged 81) Phoenix, Arizona, U.S.
- Listed height: 6 ft 5 in (1.96 m)
- Listed weight: 210 lb (95 kg)

Career information
- High school: Emmerich Manual (Indianapolis, Indiana)
- College: Indiana (1962–1965)
- NBA draft: 1965: 2nd round, 10th overall pick
- Drafted by: New York Knicks
- Playing career: 1965–1977
- Position: Shooting guard
- Number: 5

Career history

Playing
- 1965–1968: New York Knicks
- 1968–1977: Phoenix Suns

Coaching
- 1987: Phoenix Suns (interim)

Career highlights
- 3× NBA All-Star (1969–1971); NBA All-Defensive Second Team (1974); NBA All-Rookie First Team (1966); No. 5 retired by Phoenix Suns; Third-team All-American – UPI (1965); Third-team Parade All-American (1961); Co-Indiana Mr. Basketball (1961)

Career NBA statistics
- Points: 15,079 (16.4 ppg)
- Rebounds: 3,807 (4.1 rpg)
- Assists: 3,057 (3.3 apg)
- Stats at NBA.com
- Stats at Basketball Reference

Richard Albert Van Arsdale (February 22, 1943 – December 16, 2024) was an American professional basketball player in the National Basketball Association (NBA) for the New York Knicks and Phoenix Suns. A three-time NBA All-Star selection with the Suns, his No. 5 jersey was retired by the Phoenix Suns and he is a member of the Suns Ring of Honor. Jerry Colangelo, who was the Suns' first general manager, interim coach (twice), and part owner called Van Arsdale "the pillar of the Phoenix Suns franchise" upon Van Arsdale's retirement in 1977. An All-Star in each of his first three seasons with Phoenix, Van Arsdale remains known as "the Original Sun".

Van Arsdale played college basketball for the Indiana Hoosiers, along with his identical twin brother, Tom. In high school, Van Arsdale and his brother were jointly named Indiana Mr. Basketball in 1961. The New York Knicks selected Van Arsdale in the second round of the 1965 NBA draft. He and Tom were both named to the NBA All-Rookie First Team. Van Arsdale played three seasons for the Knicks before being selected by the Suns with their first pick of the 1968 NBA expansion draft. He played with the Suns for the next nine seasons, retiring after the 1976–77 season (during which his brother Tom was a Suns' teammate). From 1977 to 2005, he remained with the Suns' franchise as a radio and television color commentator, interim coach (1987), and team executive; until suffering a stroke in 2005.

== Early life ==
Van Arsdale was born on February 22, 1943, in Indianapolis, along with his identical twin brother, Tom, to Raymond and Hilda (Thomas) Van Arsdale. The family lived in Greenwood, Indiana. The brothers attended Emmerich Manual High School in Indianapolis (Indianapolis Manual), where their father Raymond taught mathematics and coached the track team, and their mother Hilda worked in the school's office. Academically, as graduating seniors in 1961 Dick was ranked first and Tom third in a class of 412 students. The brothers were members of the basketball, football, baseball, and track and field teams at Indianapolis Manual. Van Arsdale focused on basketball and track, participating in high hurdles and shot put.

In 1961, the brothers were jointly awarded the Indiana Mr. Basketball award. They were also awarded the Arthur L. Trester Award for Mental Attitude in March 1961. This was the first time that Indiana's Mr. Basketball award, and the Trester Award (established in 1917), had been shared. The brothers were the unanimous choice of the Indiana High School Athletic Association's board for the Trester Award.

Van Arsdale set Indianapolis Manual's career scoring record while playing there. The Van Arsdales were both named to the Indiana All-Star basketball team that played against a team of Kentucky high school all-stars twice as part of an annual interstate competition. In March 1961, the Van Arsdales led No. 3 ranked Indianapolis Manual to the state championship game, having won their previous 21 games. Manual lost 68–66 to Kokomo High School in overtime; with Van Arsdale scoring a game-high 26 points. The Van Arsdales received the Trester Award at that time.

== College career ==
Kentucky Wildcats coach Adolph Rupp tried to get the brothers to attend the University of Kentucky, and UCLA head coach John Wooden recruited them, but they chose Indiana University Bloomington, playing for the Hoosiers from 1962 to 1965 under head coach Branch McCracken. The brothers had been avid fans of Indiana and McCracken since they were children, and wanted to attend Indiana, without the need for anyone to recruit them. At 6 ft 5 in (1.96 m), Van Arsdale and his brother played small forward at Indiana, and were praised by Michigan Wolverines head coach Dave Strack in 1964, "'the twins are as good a pair of corner men as you would want to find'". United Press International (UPI) named him a third-team All-American in 1965. UPI named both Dick and Tom Van Arsdale first-team academic All-Americans in 1965.

As a sophomore (1962–63), Van Arsdale averaged 12.2 points and 8.9 rebounds per game. As a junior (1963–64), he averaged 22.3 points and 12.4 rebounds per game. UPI named him first-team All-Big Ten. In a December 4, 1963 win over Notre Dame, Van Arsdale scored his Indiana career high of 42 points and Tom Van Arsdale scored his Indiana career high of 34 points. He was fifth in the Big Ten Conference in rebounding average and sixth in scoring average that season. As a senior (1964–65), Van Arsdale averaged 17.2 points and 8.7 rebounds per game. The Associated Press (AP) named him (and Tom) second-team All–Big Ten.

In three years with the Hoosiers, Van Arsdale scored 1,240 points with 719 rebounds (while his brother scored 1,252 points with 723 rebounds). He averaged a double-double for the Hoosiers over his career, with 17.2 points per game and 10.0 rebounds per game.

While at Indiana, the Van Arsdales were members of the Sigma Alpha Epsilon fraternity, where they roomed for three years with teammate, and future NBA guard, Jon McGlocklin; who was sometimes called the third twin. Van Arsdale was a member of the U.S. team that won the gold medal in the 1965 Summer Universiade.

== Professional career ==
=== New York Knicks ===
Van Arsdale was selected by the New York Knicks in the second round of the 1965 NBA draft with the 13th overall pick, immediately ahead of his brother Tom who was selected by the Detroit Pistons. Among the picks counted as being ahead of him were three territorial selections, in addition to players chosen in the normal selection process. Although he started as a small forward very early in his career, he was moved to shooting guard. Van Arsdale started 69 games for the Knicks as a rookie, principally at shooting guard. He averaged 29 minutes, 12.3 points, 4.8 rebounds, and 2.3 assists per game. Van Arsdale was named to the NBA All-Rookie Team in 1966, together with Tom. They were the first pair of identical twins to play in the league.

The following season (1966–67), Van Arsdale started 79 games at shooting guard. He averaged 36.6 minutes, 15.1 points, 7.0 rebounds, and 3.1 assists per game. The Knicks were 36–45, but reached the first round of the 1967 Eastern Division playoffs, losing to the Boston Celtics in four games. Van Arsdale averaged 38.3 minutes, 11.5 points, 6.3 rebounds, and five assists against the Celtics. Van Arsdale played in 78 games in 1967–68 for the Knicks, starting 50. He was used at guard and small forward, but was not physically at full strength throughout the season. He still averaged 30.1 minutes, 11 points, 5.4 rebounds, and 2.9 assists per game. The Knicks lost the 1968 Eastern Conference semifinals to the Philadelphia 76ers in six games, with Van Arsdale playing in four of those games, averaging 22 minutes in those games.

Among other players, the 1967–68 Knicks included all-star and future Hall of Fame shooting guard Dick Barnett, future Hall of Fame point guard Walt Frazier, future Hall of Fame small forward Bill Bradley (who was used at shooting guard that season), and small forward Cazzie Russell. The Knicks left Van Arsdale unprotected in the 1968 NBA expansion draft, and he was selected by the Phoenix Suns.

In three seasons with the Knicks, Van Arsdale averaged 31.9 minutes, 12.8 points, 5.7 rebounds, and 2.8 assists per game.

=== Phoenix Suns ===
Van Arsdale was "generally acknowledged as the best player" available in the 1968 expansion draft, and Phoenix made him the team's first pick. Van Arsdale eventually became known as "the Original Sun", and was connected with the franchise as a player, executive, coach, and sportscaster over a period of decades. Van Arsdale scored the first points in Sun history.

In the Suns' inaugural season, playing under coach Johnny "Red" Kerr, Van Arsdale was the team's shooting guard and future Hall of Fame guard Gail Goodrich was the point guard. Van Arsdale started 80 games, led the Suns in minutes per game (42.4), and his 21 points per game was second to Goodrich (23.8). Although the Suns went 16–66 in the team's first season, both Van Arsdale and Goodrich were selected to play for the West team in the 1969 NBA All-Star Game.

The Suns improved to 39–43 the following season (1969–70). Forwards Connie Hawkins (a future Hall of Famer) and Paul Silas joined the team that season, and Goodrich remained the starting point guard. Van Arsdale's 21.3 points per game was second on the team to Hawkins. On the season, he had a career-high .508 field goal percentage. Van Arsdale became only the fifth non-center in NBA history to have a scoring average of over 20 points per game and a field goal percentage above .500 in the same season (after Hall of Famers Oscar Robertson, Jerry West, and Bailey Howell, and three-time all-star and Rookie of the Year Terry Dischinger).

For a second consecutive season Van Arsdale was selected to play as a member of the West team in the 1970 All-Star Game. His brother Tom was selected as a member of the East team. This was the first time in NBA history two brothers had played in the same NBA All-Star Game. In only their second season, the Suns made it to the NBA playoffs. They took a three-games-to-one lead over the Los Angeles Lakers in the Western Division semifinals, but ultimately lost that series in seven games. Over seven games, Van Arsdale averaged 36.4 minutes, 16.4 points, 2.6 rebounds, and 4.1 assists per game against the Lakers. He also had the task of playing defense against future Hall of Fame Lakers' guard Jerry West in that series.

In 1970–71, Van Arsdale was the Suns' team captain. He was selected to play for the West team in the 1971 NBA All-Star Game for a third consecutive season; with his brother Tom once again selected to play for the East team. Van Arsdale led the Suns in minutes per game (39) and points per game (21.9) that season. Under new head coach Cotton Fitzsimmons, the Suns finished the 1970–71 season 48–34. However, the Suns played in the NBA's most competitive division, the Midwest Division of the Western Conference, finishing third and missing the playoffs.

The Suns were 49–33 in 1971–72, but again ended in third place in the Midwest Division. Van Arsdale played in all 82 games, averaging nearly 38 minutes per game. He averaged 19.7 points, 4.1 rebounds, and 3.6 assists per game. He played in 81 games the following season, averaging 36.8 minutes, 18.4 points, four rebounds, and 3.3 assists per game; but the Suns fell to 38–44. The next season (1973–74), now playing under head coach John McLeod and still team captain, Van Arsdale averaged 17.8 points, 2.8 rebounds, and 4.2 assists per game. He was selected to the second-team of the NBA All-Defensive Team in 1974.

Over the next two seasons (1974–75, 1975–76) Van Arsdale remained the starting shooting guard, though his minutes were reducing, in part because of injury. Respectively, he averaged 34.6 and 32.2 minutes, 16.1 and 12.9 points, 2.7 and 2.4 rebounds, and 2.8 and 2.4 assists per game. Van Arsdale was the Suns' team captain in 1975–76. He was the starting shooting guard that season until suffering a fractured wrist in his left arm in February.

The Suns were only 42–40 in 1975–76, but returned to the playoffs after five years, and reached the 1976 NBA Finals, losing in six games to the Boston Celtics. In the six-game win over the Seattle SuperSonics in the Western Conference semifinals, Van Arsdale averaged 19.5 minutes and 9.7 points per game. In Game 3 against the Sonics, playing with a splint on his left wrist, Van Arsdale came off of the bench to lead the Suns to a 103–91 win. He scored 15 points in 27 minutes, and defensively held Sonics' guard Fred Brown to 16 points, after Brown had scored 34 and 45 points in the previous two games.

The Suns then defeated the Golden State Warriors in the Western Conference finals in seven games, with Van Arsdale averaging 26.3 minutes, 9.1 points, 2.6 assists, and 1.3 steals per game. Van Arsdale's play on both offense and defense in the Suns' Game 6 105–104 win was a key to the Suns tying the series against the Warriors, before going on to win Game 7. In 33 minutes off the bench, Van Arsdale had 10 points, six assists, and four steals; and he "took Warrior all-pro guard Phil Smith out of the game in the second half". In the finals against the Celtics, Van Arsdale averaged 28.5 minutes, 6.7 points, 1.7 rebounds, and 1.8 assists per game.

Tom Van Arsdale was traded to the Suns for a second-round draft choice and cash in August 1976. The 1976–77 season was the first time the brothers had played on the same team since their college days. They both retired after that season. In his final NBA season, Van Arsdale averaged 19.7 minutes and 7.7 points per game. At the time Van Arsdale retired, he was the last of the original Phoenix Suns. Upon Van Arsdale's retirement, Suns' general manager Jerry Colangelo called Van Arsdale "'the pillar of the Phoenix Suns franchise".

Van Arsdale played with the Suns for nine seasons, averaging 35.4 minutes, 17.6 points, 4.1 rebounds, and 3.3 assists per game. He had a .471 field goal percentage and .813 free throw percentage. During his Suns' career he led the team five times in free throw percentage, three times in minutes played, twice in scoring, and once in field goal percentage. He was the Suns all-time leader in total points scored (12,070) until January 1986, when he was surpassed by Alvan Adams. Starting in 1969–70 with the Suns, he became one of the better free throw shooters in the league, averaging near or over 80% from 1969 to 1977. In 1971–72, he was in the top five players in free throw percentage, and in the top 10 in 1972–73.

Over his NBA career, Van Arsdale averaged 16.4 points per game, 4.1 rebounds per game, and 3.3 assists per game.

== Legacy and honors ==
Van Arsdale was inducted into the Indiana Basketball Hall of Fame in 1988. Van Arsdale is a member of the Suns' Ring of Honor. The Suns retired his No. 5 jersey. He is remembered in Phoenix basketball lore as "the Original Sun"; being the first player selected by the Suns in the 1968 expansion draft and the last member of the inaugural Phoenix Suns to play for the team. In February 2019, the Van Arsdale brothers were honored by Indiana at halftime of a game between Indiana and Purdue. The original lockers of both Tom and Dick Van Arsdale remain in the display case in the lobby of the Emmerich Manual High School (now Christel House Watanabe Manual High School) gymnasium.

Indiana teammate, 11-year NBA guard, and close friend Jon McGlocklin said of the Van Arsdales, "'People have always asked me all through the college years and pro years, Well which one’s better? . . . Impossible. I honestly, if Jesus asked me that, I could not give him an answer. They’re equal. … Tom and Dick stood their ground with any 6-8 forward in the Big Ten and rebounded. They were outstanding rebounders and they controlled the boards'". Associated Press Sportswriter Mike Recht wrote in April 1971 for the magazine Sports Today that the brothers did not like playing against each other in the NBA.

== Media and executive career with the Suns ==
In 1977, after retiring as a player, Van Arsdale became a color commentator on radio and television for the Suns over the ensuing 10 years. This included working alongside Al McCoy. McCoy, known as the "Voice of the Suns", died just two months before Van Arsdale, in September 2024.

Following the firing of head coach John MacLeod in February 1987 (with a record of 22–36), the Suns made Van Arsdale the team's interim head coach for that season's final 26 games. He received a standing ovation from Suns' fans when he came out to coach his first game in Phoenix. The Suns were 14–12 under Van Arsdale, however, he preferred scouting and player evaluation to coaching and did not continue as a coach.

In 1987, Jerry Colangelo – who had been the Suns' general manager since the team's inception, had selected Van Arsdale for the Suns in the 1968 expansion draft, and coached Van Arsdale twice –formed a group that purchased the Suns. The new owners hired Van Arsdale as vice president of player personnel in 1987. He was promoted to senior vice president in 2004. One year later, he suffered a debilitating stroke. He is also said to have been the team's general manager.

== Personal life and death ==
Van Arsdale and his wife Barbara moved their family to Arizona in 1972. During his time as a player in Phoenix, he sold real estate during the offseason. After retiring he and Tom Van Arsdale operated a real estate business together in Phoenix. In 2005, Van Arsdale suffered a massive stroke, but made a physical recovery, though with some speech difficulties. Through diligent effort and therapy after his stroke, Van Arsdale became "an accomplished pen-and-ink artist". He and Tom shared a post-retirement art studio in Scottsdale, Arizona, which they opened in May 2018. Their art focused on promoting racial tolerance and harmony.

At some point early in their NBA careers, the brothers observed that Tom Van Arsdale had become ½ inch taller than his brother. The Van Arsdale brothers did a Miller Lite Beer commercial in 1978. A book about the Van Arsdale brothers was published in 1992, Two of a Kind: The Tom and Dick Van Arsdale Story, with a forward by former NBA coach Cotton Fitzsimmons.

Van Arsdale died of kidney failure in Phoenix, Arizona, on December 16, 2024, at the age of 81.

== Career playing statistics ==
Legend
GP	Games played	GS	Games started	MPG	Minutes per game
FG%	Field goal percentage	3P%	3-point field goal percentage	FT%	Free throw percentage
RPG	Rebounds per game	APG	Assists per game	SPG	Steals per game
BPG	Blocks per game	PPG	Points per game	**Bold**	Career high
*	Led the league

=== NBA ===
==== Regular season ====
Year	Team	GP	GS	MPG	FG%	FT%	RPG	APG	SPG	BPG	PPG
1965–66	New York	79	69	29.0	.428	.715	4.8	2.3			12.3
1966–67	New York	79	**79**	36.6	.449	.729	**7.0**	3.1			15.1
1967–68	New York	78	50	30.1	.436	.670	5.4	2.9			11.0
1968–69	Phoenix	80		**42.4**	.442	.705	6.9	**4.8**			21.0
1969–70	Phoenix	77		38.5	**.508**	.798	3.4	4.4			21.3
1970–71	Phoenix	81		39.0	.452	.811	3.9	4.1			**21.9**
1971–72	Phoenix	**82**		37.8	.463	.845	4.1	3.6			19.7
1972–73	Phoenix	81		36.8	.476	.859	4.0	3.3			18.4
1973–74	Phoenix	78		36.3	.500	.853	2.8	4.2	**1.2**	**.2**	17.8
1974–75	Phoenix	70		34.6	.470	.832	2.7	2.8	**1.2**	**.2**	16.1
1975–76	Phoenix	58		32.2	.484	.830	2.4	2.4	.9	**.2**	12.9
1976–77	Phoenix	78		19.7	.456	**.873**	1.5	1.5	.4	.1	7.7
Career		921	198	34.5	.464	.790	4.1	3.3	.9	.2	16.4
All-Star		3	0	12.7	.500	.000	2.7	1.7			5.3

==== Playoffs ====
Year	Team	GP	MPG	FG%	FT%	RPG	APG	SPG	BPG	PPG
1967	New York	4	**38.3**	.319	.727	**6.3**	3.5			11.5
1968	New York	4	22.0	.227	.750	4.0	3.3			3.3
1970	Phoenix	7	36.4	.430	**.879**	2.6	**4.1**			**16.4**
1976	Phoenix	**19***	24.8	**.488**	.870	1.2	2.0	.7	.1	8.5
Career		34	28.5	.422	.838	2.4	2.8	.7	.1	9.9

=== College ===
Year	Team	GP	FG%	FT%	RPG	PPG
1962–63	Indiana	**24**	.422	.718	8.9	12.2
1963–64	Indiana	**24**	**.449**	.803	**12.4**	**22.3**
1964–65	Indiana	**24**	.446	**.852**	8.7	17.2
Career		72	.442	.793	10.0	17.2

== Head coaching record ==
Legend
Regular season	G	Games coached	W	Games won	L	Games lost	W–L %	Win–loss %
Playoffs	PG	Playoff games	PW	Playoff wins	PL	Playoff losses	PW–L %	Playoff win–loss %

Team	Year	G	W	L	W–L%	Finish	PG	PW	PL	PW–L%	Result
Phoenix	1986–87	26	14	12	.538	5th in Pacific	—	—	—	—	Missed playoffs
