= Greg Jackson (basketball, born 1952) =

American basketball player (1952–2012)

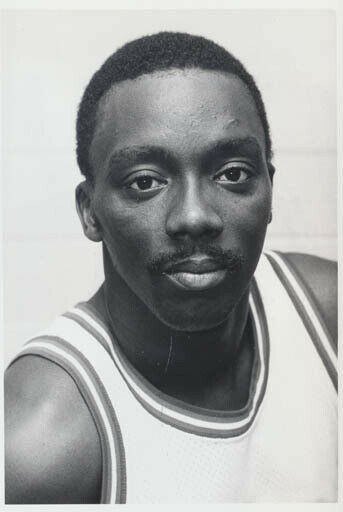
- Jackson with the Allentown Jets in 1977

Personal information
- Born: August 2, 1952 Brooklyn, New York, U.S.
- Died: May 1, 2012 (aged 59) Brooklyn, New York, U.S.
- Listed height: 6 ft 0 in (1.83 m)
- Listed weight: 180 lb (82 kg)

Career information
- High school: Tilden (Brooklyn, New York)
- College: Guilford (1970–1974)
- NBA draft: 1974: 5th round, 86th overall pick
- Drafted by: New York Knicks
- Playing career: 1974–1981
- Position: Point guard
- Number: 7, 24

Career history
- 1974: New York Knicks
- 1975: Phoenix Suns
- 1974–1981: Allentown / Lehigh Valley Jets

Career highlights
- 2× EBA champion (1975, 1976); EBA Playoff/Finals MVP (1976); All-EBA First Team (1977); 2× All-EBA/CBA Second Team (1976, 1979); CBA assists leader (1981)

Career statistics
- Points: 182
- Rebounds: 69
- Assists: 96
- Stats at NBA.com
- Stats at Basketball Reference

Gregory Jackson (August 2, 1952 – May 1, 2012) was an American basketball player. He won a collegiate national championship at Guilford College and later played in the National Basketball Association (NBA).

Jackson, a 6'0" point guard from Samuel J. Tilden High School in Brooklyn, New York. He attended West Columbus High School 1969–1970, Cerro Gordo, NC. He helped lead West Columbus to its first and only NCHSAA 2A State Basketball Tournament championship. He played his college basketball at Guilford College in Greensboro, North Carolina. There he teamed in the backcourt with future NBA All-Star Lloyd Free (now World B. Free) to lead the Quakers to the 1973 National Association of Intercollegiate Athletics national championship.

After his college career was over, Jackson was drafted in the fifth round of the 1974 NBA draft (86th pick overall) by his hometown New York Knicks. His tenure with the Knicks would prove to be brief, as he played only 5 games before being waived on October 28, 1974. Later in the season, he was signed by the Phoenix Suns, where he finished the season. For the year he averaged 3.7 points and 2.0 assists over 49 games. In the offseason, Jackson was traded to the Washington Bullets, but never played in the NBA again. During his playing career, Jackson also played for the Allentown Jets of the Eastern Basketball Association (EBA) / Continental Basketball Association (CBA). He won EBA championships with the Jets in 1975 and 1976. He was selected as the EBA Playoff/Finals MVP in 1976. Jackson was named to the All-EBA First Team in 1977 and All-EBA/CBA Second Team in 1976 and 1979.

Following the close of his professional career, Jackson became a community leader in Brooklyn as the long-time manager of the Brownsville Recreational Center. In this capacity he ran numerous programs aimed at keeping inner-city youths off the streets and focused toward positive efforts ranging from sports to the arts.

Jackson died on May 1, 2012.

== Career statistics ==
Legend
GP	Games played	GS	Games started	MPG	Minutes per game
FG%	Field goal percentage	3P%	3-point field goal percentage	FT%	Free throw percentage
RPG	Rebounds per game	APG	Assists per game	SPG	Steals per game
BPG	Blocks per game	PPG	Points per game	**Bold**	Career high

=== NBA ===
==== Regular season ====
Year	Team	GP	GS	MPG	FG%	FT%	RPG	APG	SPG	BPG	PPG
1974–75	New York	5	0	5.4	.400	–	.4	.6	.0	.0	1.6
1974–75	Phoenix	**44**		**17.6**	**.416**	**.581**	**1.5**	**2.1**	**.5**	**.2**	**4.0**
Career		49	0	16.4	.415	.581	1.4	2.0	.5	.2	3.7
