= Gary Melchionni =

American basketball player

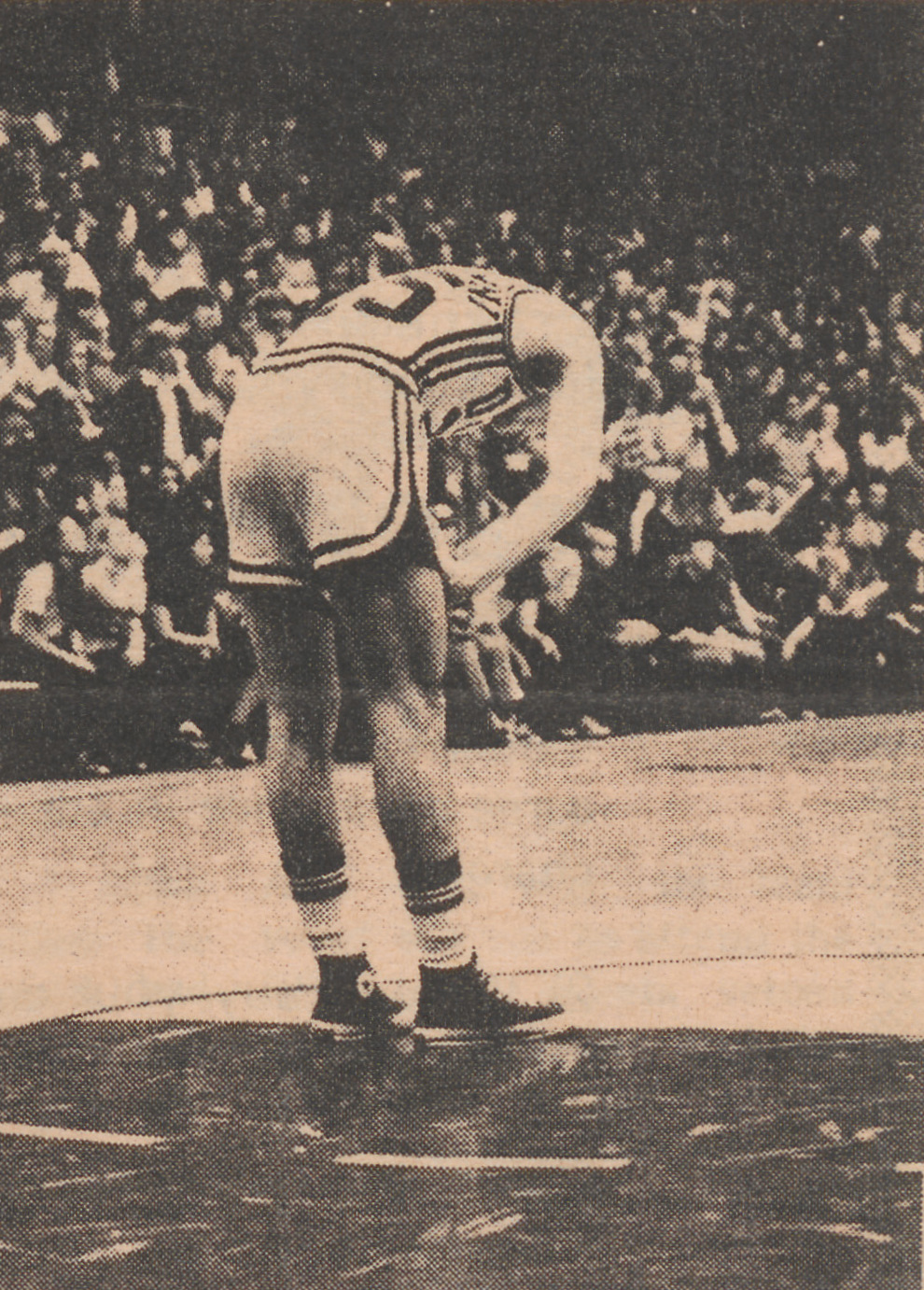
- Melchionni with Duke, 1972–73

Personal information
- Born: January 19, 1951 (age 75) Camden, New Jersey
- Listed height: 6 ft 2 in (1.88 m)
- Listed weight: 185 lb (84 kg)

Career information
- High school: Bishop Eustace Preparatory (Pennsauken, New Jersey)
- College: Duke (1970–1973)
- NBA draft: 1973: 2nd round, 33rd overall pick
- Drafted by: Phoenix Suns
- Playing career: 1973–1977
- Position: Point guard
- Number: 25

Career history
- 1973–1975: Phoenix Suns
- 1975–1976: Hazleton Bullets
- 1976–1977: Udinese

Career highlights
- First-team All-ACC (1973); Second-team All-ACC (1972)
- Stats at NBA.com
- Stats at Basketball Reference

Gary Dennis Melchionni (born January 19, 1951) is a retired American professional basketball player who played in the National Basketball Association (NBA) and other leagues. He is a former Phoenix Suns guard and a former All-Atlantic Coast Conference performer while he was with the Duke Blue Devils, where he was the first player to captain twice. He is the father of former Duke basketball player Lee Melchionni.

Gary captained his Bishop Eustace Prep team to an undefeated 26–0 record and a New Jersey state championship his senior year. After his professional basketball career, Gary returned to Duke for law school. He later became President of the Duke alumni association and has had a successful career in law at Stevens and Lee, a Lancaster, PA law firm.

== Career statistics ==
Legend
GP	Games played	GS	Games started	MPG	Minutes per game
FG%	Field goal percentage	3P%	3-point field goal percentage	FT%	Free throw percentage
RPG	Rebounds per game	APG	Assists per game	SPG	Steals per game
BPG	Blocks per game	PPG	Points per game	**Bold**	Career high

=== NBA ===
==== Regular season ====
Year	Team	GP	MPG	FG%	FT%	RPG	APG	SPG	BPG	PPG
1973-74	Phoenix	**69**	18.1	**.460**	**.860**	2.1	2.1	.6	.1	7.2
1974-75	Phoenix	68	**22.5**	.430	.809	**2.8**	**2.3**	**.7**	**.2**	**8.5**
Career		137	20.3	.444	.831	2.4	2.2	.6	.2	7.8
