= Charlie Scott (basketball) =

American basketball player (born 1948)

Charles Scott
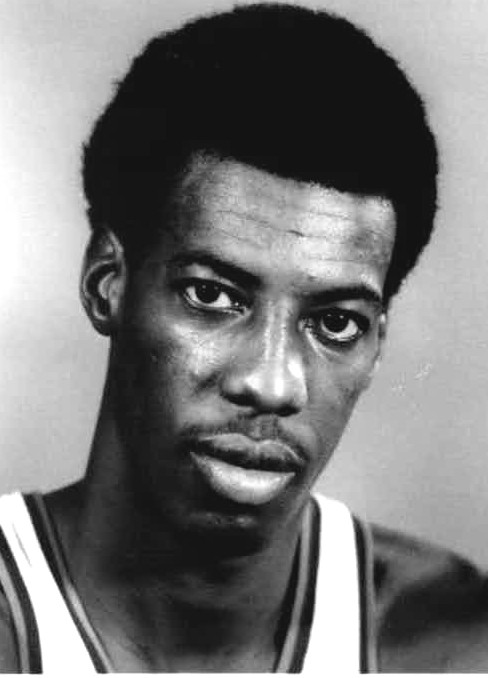

Personal information
- Born: December 15, 1948 (age 77) New York City, New York, U.S.
- Listed height: 6 ft 5 in (1.96 m)
- Listed weight: 175 lb (79 kg)

Career information
- High school: Stuyvesant (New York City, New York); Laurinburg Institute (Laurinburg, North Carolina)
- College: North Carolina (1967–1970)
- NBA draft: 1970: 7th round, 106th overall pick
- Drafted by: Boston Celtics
- Playing career: 1970–1980
- Position: Point guard / shooting guard
- Number: 33, 11

Career history
- 1970–1972: Virginia Squires
- 1972–1975: Phoenix Suns
- 1975–1977: Boston Celtics
- 1977–1978: Los Angeles Lakers
- 1978–1980: Denver Nuggets

Career highlights
- NBA champion (1976); 3× NBA All-Star (1973–1975); 2× ABA All-Star (1971, 1972); All-ABA First Team (1971); All-ABA Second Team (1972); ABA Rookie of the Year (1971); ABA All-Rookie First Team (1971); ABA All-Time Team; 2× Consensus second-team All-American (1969, 1970); ACC Athlete of the Year (1970); 3× First-team All-ACC (1968–1970)

Career ABA / NBA statistics
- Points: 14,837 (20.7 ppg)
- Rebounds: 2,846 (4.0 rpg)
- Assists: 3,515 (4.9 apg)
- Stats at NBA.com
- Stats at Basketball Reference
- Basketball Hall of Fame
- Collegiate Basketball Hall of Fame
Medals
Men's basketball
Representing the United States
Olympic Games
Gold medal – first place	1968 Mexico City	Team competition

Charles Thomas Scott, also known as Shaheed Abdul-Aleem, (born December 15, 1948) is an American former professional basketball player. He played two seasons in the American Basketball Association (ABA) and eight seasons in the National Basketball Association (NBA). Scott was an Olympic Gold Medalist and was inducted into the Naismith Memorial Basketball Hall of Fame in 2018. Scott is the leader in most points per game with 24.8 in Suns franchise history.

== Early life ==
Scott was born in New York City and grew up primarily in Harlem, New York. There, his father was a cab driver.

A 6-foot-5-inch (1.96 m) guard/forward, Scott attended Stuyvesant High School in New York City for one year before transferring to Laurinburg Institute in Laurinburg, North Carolina. Scott transferred to Laurinburg which was famous at the time for preparing basketball players for college. Scott said, "It had a well-known basketball program. I knew my family wouldn't be able to afford college, so a scholarship was going to be my ticket." Scott was valedictorian of his high school senior class. He was also a legend at Rucker Park.

While in high school, Scott spent one summer at a basketball program at Davidson College with coach Lefty Driesell. Driesell recruited Scott who was accepted for early admission at Davidson. However, Scott also explored Duke University, North Carolina State University, the University of North Carolina at Chapel Hill, and Wake Forest University at the suggestion of his coach at Laurinburg. He ultimately accepted the offer to play at UNC because he felt that, as a larger public university, it would be more open to a black player "breaking the color barrier," as the first black player in the Atlantic Coast Conference, in 1967.

== College career ==
Scott played college basketball at the University of North Carolina at Chapel Hill (UNC) where he was the first black scholarship athlete. Scott averaged 22.1 points and 7.1 rebounds per game at UNC, and a career-best 27.1 points per game in his senior season. He was a two-time All-American and a three-time all-Atlantic Coast Conference selection. Scott led UNC to their second and third consecutive NCAA Final Four appearances in 1968 and 1969.

Woody Durham, a long-time radio announcer for UNC basketball said, "He really was something. He was the first Carolina player that really would compare to today's player. His build, his speed, his ability—you could take him out of the late 1960s and drop him into today's game, and he wouldn't miss a beat."

In addition to breaking the color barrier in UNC basketball, he was also the first African-American to pledge a fraternity at UNC, accepting an offer to join St. Anthony Hall, in 1967. However, three weeks after pledging, Scott withdrew from the fraternity because of his demanding basketball schedule.

Scott was a gold medalist at the 1968 Summer Olympics playing for the 1968 United States men's Olympic basketball team. Scott was the fourth leading scorer on the team (8.0) coached by Henry Iba.

== Professional career ==
Scott was drafted by the Boston Celtics in 1970 but he had already signed a contract with the Virginia Squires of the American Basketball Association (ABA). Scott was named ABA Rookie of the Year after averaging 27.1 points per game. During his second season with the Squires, he set the ABA record for the highest scoring average in one season (34.6 points per game). However, he became dissatisfied with life in the ABA and joined the NBA's Phoenix Suns in 1972. The Suns traded Paul Silas to the Celtics after the season in order to keep him. At that point, he briefly went by the name Shaheed Abdul-Aleem.

Scott continued his stellar play in the NBA, representing the Suns in three straight NBA All-Star Games (1973, 1974, and 1975), then was traded to the Boston Celtics for Paul Westphal and two draft picks. With the Celtics in the 1975-76 NBA season, Scott won a championship ring against the Suns. Scott later played for the Los Angeles Lakers and Denver Nuggets. He retired in 1980 with 14,837 combined ABA/NBA career points.

He was inducted into the Naismith Memorial Basketball Hall of Fame in 2018.

== Personal life ==
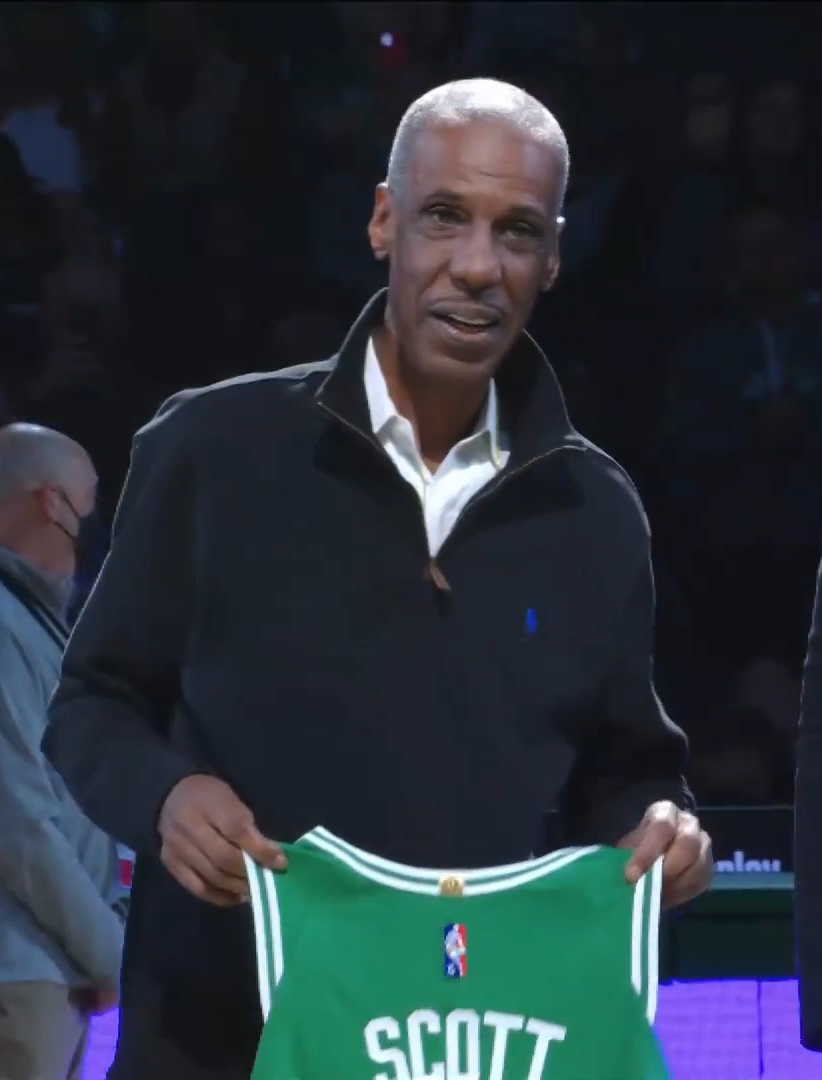
Scott in 2022

Scott was childhood friends with actor Demond Wilson of Sanford & Son fame.

While attending the University of North Carolina at Chapel Hill, Scott married Margaret Holmes. They had a daughter, Holly Scott Emanuel.

Scott and his current wife, Trudy, have three children—sons Shaun Scott and Shannon Dean Scott and daughter Simone Scott—and have lived primarily in Atlanta and Los Angeles. They currently live in Columbus, Ohio, where son Shannon used to play for the Ohio State Buckeyes.

After retiring from the NBA, Scott served as a marketing director for the sports apparel company Champion for several years, then as executive vice president of CTS, a telemarketing firm, before owning his own business.

== ABA and NBA statistics ==
Legend
GP	Games played	GS	Games started	MPG	Minutes per game
FG%	Field goal percentage	3P%	3-point field goal percentage	FT%	Free throw percentage
RPG	Rebounds per game	APG	Assists per game	SPG	Steals per game
BPG	Blocks per game	PPG	Points per game	**Bold**	Career high
‡	NBA record

**Bold**	Denotes career high

=== Regular season ===
Year	Team	GP	GS	MPG	FG%	3P%	FT%	RPG	APG	SPG	BPG	PPG
1970–71	Virginia (ABA)	**84**	–	37.9	**.463**	.246	.746	**5.2**	5.6	–	–	27.1
1971–72	Virginia (ABA)	73	–	**41.9**	.449	**.264**	.803	5.1	4.8	–	–	**34.6**‡
1971–72	Phoenix	6	–	29.5	.425	–	**.810**	3.8	4.3	–	–	18.8
1972–73	Phoenix	81	–	37.8	.446	–	.784	4.2	**6.1**	–	–	25.3
1973–74	Phoenix	52	–	38.5	.459	–	.781	4.3	5.2	**1.9**	**0.4**	25.4
1974–75	Phoenix	69	–	37.6	.441	–	.781	4.0	4.5	1.6	0.3	24.3
1975–76†	Boston	82	–	35.5	.449	–	.797	4.4	4.2	1.3	0.3	17.6
1976–77	Boston	43	–	36.8	.444	–	.746	4.4	4.6	1.4	0.3	18.2
1977–78	Boston	31	–	34.8	.433	–	.712	3.3	4.6	1.6	0.2	16.3
1977–78	L.A. Lakers	48	–	29.0	.442	–	.775	3.1	4.9	1.2	0.2	11.7
1978–79	Denver	79	–	29.0	.442	–	.775	3.1	4.9	1.2	**0.4**	12.0
1979–80	Denver	69	–	33.1	.460	.182	.749	2.7	5.4	1.2	0.3	9.3
**ABA Career**		157	–	39.8	.456	.257	.775	5.2	5.2			30.6‡
**NBA Career**		560	–	34.4	.444		.772	3.6	4.8	1.3	0.3	17.9
**Total Career**		717	–	35.6	.448		.773	4.0	4.9	1.3	0.3	20.7

=== Playoffs ===
Year	Team	GP	GS	MPG	FG%	3P%	FT%	RPG	APG	SPG	BPG	PPG
1971	Virginia (ABA)	12	–	**42.0**	.409	**.258**	.755	**6.6**	**6.8**	–	–	**26.8**
1976†	Boston	**18**	–	35.1	.391	–	.764	4.2	3.9	1.2	0.4	15.4
1977	Boston	9	–	37.6	.406	–	**.846**	4.2	4.2	**1.4**	0.2	16.4
1978	L.A. Lakers	3	–	34.3	.300	–	.750	4.3	4.7	1.3	0.0	10.0
1979	Denver	3	–	34.7	**.476**	–	.571	4.7	3.3	0.7	**0.7**	16.0
Career		45	–	37.4	.400	.258	.766	4.9	4.8	1.2	0.4	18.3
