= Lee Melchionni =

American basketball player (born 1983)

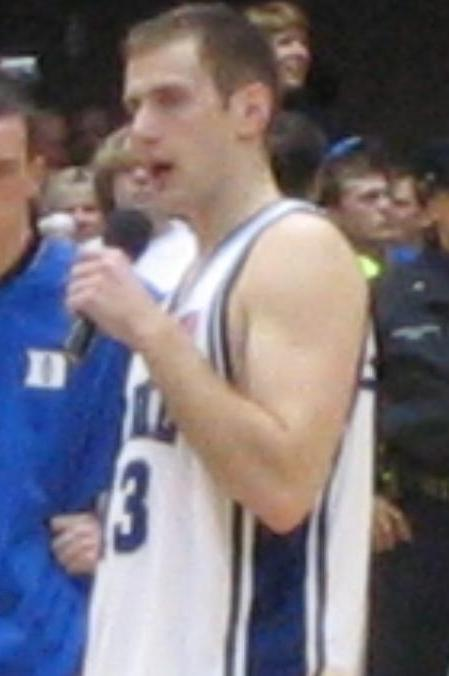
- Lee Melchionni talking to the crowd after his last game in Cameron Indoor Stadium

Personal information
- Born: September 30, 1983 (age 43) Lancaster, Pennsylvania, U.S.
- Listed height: 6 ft 6 in (1.98 m)
- Listed weight: 205 lb (93 kg)

Career information
- High school: Germantown Academy (Fort Washington, Pennsylvania)
- College: Duke (2002–2006)
- NBA draft: 2006: undrafted
- Playing career: 2006–2007
- Position: Small forward / power forward
- Number: 13

Career history
- 2006–2007: Cimberio Novara

Career highlights
- McDonald's All-American honorable mention (2002)

Lee Melchionni (born September 30, 1983) is an American sports agent and former professional basketball player. Melchionni played college basketball for the Duke Blue Devils in the NCAA.

== High school career ==
Melchionni was a high honorable mention All-American in the 2001–02 season and a high honorable mention McDonald's All-America. He was a two-time all-state selection (2001–2002), three-time all-county selection, and two-time all-city selection. He was the MVP of the 2002 Prime Time Shootout. During his senior year at Germantown Academy in Fort Washington, Pennsylvania, he averaged 19.7 points, 9.2 rebounds, 5.0 assists, and 3.0 steals. Melchionni finished with over 1200 points and 800 rebounds. He also averaged 16 points, a team-best 9.0 rebounds, 4.0 assists, and 4.0 steals as a junior. He helped lead Germantown to a 27–3 record and a number 17 national ranking by USA Today in 2000–01. He averaged 12.0 points, 6.0 rebounds, and 2.0 assists as a sophomore and averaged 10.0 points, 5.0 rebounds, and 2.0 assists as a freshman.

== College career ==
Melchionni played with the Duke Blue Devils from 2002 to 2006 and was number 13. Melchionni played primarily at the forward position.

== Professional career ==
=== Cimberio Novara (2006–2007) ===
Melchionni spent a single season playing professionally in Italy for Cimberio Novara in the Italian 2nd division. Melchionni is now working as an NBA Player Agent for Wasserman Media Group, representing players like Danilo Gallinari. Melchionni was also enrolled in evening law school at Loyola Law School.

== Personal life ==
Melchionni was born in Lancaster, Pennsylvania. His father, Gary Melchionni, also played basketball at Duke and was team captain. Gary was also an All-ACC performer and was drafted by the Phoenix Suns in the 2nd Round of the 1973 NBA draft. Lee's uncle, Bill Melchionni, played college basketball with Villanova while in college and played with the Philadelphia 76ers and New Jersey Nets while playing in the NBA. Lee's younger brother, Dean Melchionni, played college basketball for the Texas Longhorns.
