= Mike Bantom =

American basketball player (born 1951)

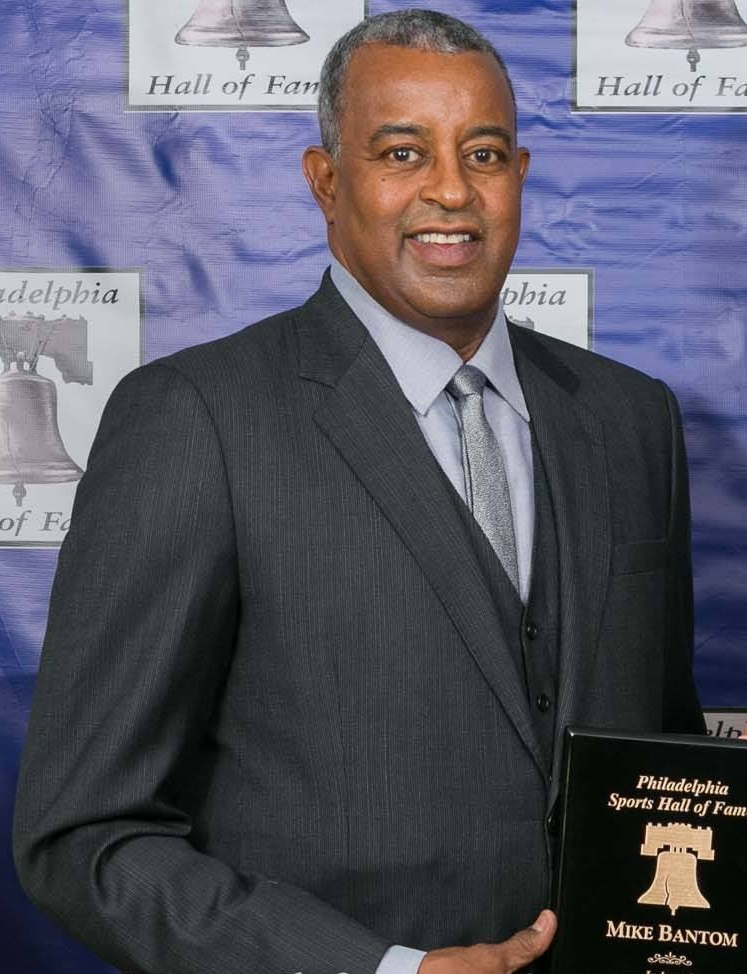

Personal information
- Born: December 3, 1951 (age 74) Philadelphia, Pennsylvania, U.S.
- Listed height: 6 ft 9 in (2.06 m)
- Listed weight: 200 lb (91 kg)

Career information
- High school: Roman Catholic (Philadelphia, Pennsylvania)
- College: Saint Joseph's (1970–1973)
- NBA draft: 1973: 1st round, 8th overall pick
- Drafted by: Phoenix Suns
- Playing career: 1973–1989
- Position: Power forward / small forward
- Number: 40, 42

Career history
- 1973–1975: Phoenix Suns
- 1975–1977: Seattle SuperSonics
- 1977: New York Nets
- 1977–1981: Indiana Pacers
- 1982: Philadelphia 76ers
- 1982–1985: Mens Sana Siena
- 1985–1986: Auxilium Torino
- 1986–1989: Virtus Roma

Career highlights
- NBA All-Rookie First Team (1974); Third-team All-American – AP (1973); No. 44 retired by Saint Joseph's Hawks

Career NBA statistics
- Points: 8,568 (12.1 ppg)
- Rebounds: 4,517 (6.4 rpg)
- Assists: 1,623 (2.3 apg)
- Stats at NBA.com
- Stats at Basketball Reference
Medals
Men's basketball
Representing United States
Olympic Games
Silver medal – second place	1972 Munich	Team

Michael Allen Bantom (born December 3, 1951) is an American former professional basketball player.

A 6'9" power forward/center from Saint Joseph's University, Bantom won a silver medal at the 1972 Summer Olympics as a member of the United States national basketball team, who lost a controversial final game to the Soviet Union. He was selected by the Phoenix Suns with the eighth pick of the 1973 NBA draft, and he embarked upon a nine-year NBA (1973–82) career as a member of the Suns, Seattle SuperSonics, New York Nets, Indiana Pacers, and Philadelphia 76ers. He earned All-Rookie Team honors and ended his NBA career with 8,568 total points, 4,517 total rebounds, and 1,623 total assists. From 1982 until 1989, Bantom played professionally in Italy.

Since retiring as a player, Bantom has served as the licensing manager for NBA International, the NBA International director of marketing, the NBA senior vice president of player development, and the executive vice president of referee operations.

Bantom is a father of four children, three daughters and a son.

== Career statistics ==
Legend
GP	Games played	GS	Games started	MPG	Minutes per game
FG%	Field goal percentage	3P%	3-point field goal percentage	FT%	Free throw percentage
RPG	Rebounds per game	APG	Assists per game	SPG	Steals per game
BPG	Blocks per game	PPG	Points per game	**Bold**	Career high
*	Led the league

=== NBA ===
==== Regular season ====
Year	Team	GP	GS	MPG	FG%	3P%	FT%	RPG	APG	SPG	BPG	PPG
1973–74	Phoenix	76		26.1	.399		.662	6.8	2.1	.7	.6	10.1
1974–75	Phoenix	**82**		27.3	.461		.714	6.7	1.9	.8	.7	12.5
1975–76	Phoenix	7		9.7	.308		**1.000**	3.3	.4	.3	.3	3.0
1975–76	Seattle	66		22.8	.471		.675	5.6	1.5	.4	.4	8.4
1976–77	Seattle	44		18.1	.488		.690	4.2	1.2	.8	.5	7.5
1976–77	N.Y. Nets	33		**33.8**	.473		.735	**8.6**	1.5	.8	.8	**18.6**
1977–78	Indiana	**82**		**33.8**	.479		.743	7.4	2.9	**1.2**	.6	15.3
1978–79	Indiana	81		31.2	.465		.672	8.0	2.8	**1.2**	.8	14.7
1979–80	Indiana	77		30.3	.505	**.333**	.665	5.9	**3.6**	1.1	.6	11.8
1980–81	Indiana	76		31.3	.489	.000	.708	5.6	3.2	1.1	1.1	14.0
1981–82	Indiana	39	**37**	26.6	.438	**.333**	.660	5.5	1.7	1.0	.6	11.7
1981–82	Philadelphia	43	1	22.8	**.510**	**.333**	.588	5.3	1.1	.6	.9	8.8
Career		706	38	27.9	.468	.200	.692	6.4	2.3	.9	.7	12.1

==== Playoffs ====
Year	Team	GP	MPG	FG%	3P%	FT%	RPG	APG	SPG	BPG	PPG
1976	Seattle	6	19.0	.579		.700	3.8	**1.3**	.7	**.3**	9.7
1981	Indiana	2	**25.5**	**.750**	–	**.714**	**4.0**	.5	.5	**.5**	**14.5**
1982	Philadelphia	**21***	19.0	.396	–	.452	3.7	1.1	**.7**	.4	4.3
Career		29	19.4	.483	–	.551	3.7	1.1	.7	.4	6.1
