= Lamar Green =

American basketball player

Personal information
- Born: March 22, 1947 (age 79) Birmingham, Alabama
- Listed height: 6 ft 7 in (2.01 m)
- Listed weight: 210 lb (95 kg)

Career information
- High school: Carver (Birmingham, Alabama)
- College: Morehead State (1966–1969)
- NBA draft: 1969: 4th round, 33rd overall pick
- Drafted by: Phoenix Suns
- Playing career: 1969–1975
- Position: Power forward / center
- Number: 16, 15

Career history
- 1969–1974: Phoenix Suns
- 1974: New Orleans Jazz
- 1974–1975: Virginia Squires

Career statistics
- Points: 2,133 (5.2 ppg)
- Rebounds: 2,550 (6.2 rpg)
- Assists: 310 (0.8 apg)
- Stats at NBA.com
- Stats at Basketball Reference

Lamar Anthony Green (born March 22, 1947) is a retired American professional basketball player.

== Career ==
A 6'7" power forward from Morehead State University, Green played six seasons (1969–1975) in the National Basketball Association and American Basketball Association. He spent five years as a backup power forward for the Phoenix Suns, averaging 5.2 points, 6.3 rebounds in 17.9 minutes a game. His most productive season came in 1972–73, when he averaged 6.7 points and 9.3 rebounds in 25.6 minutes a game. His 2,186 rebounds are the 17th most in Suns franchise history, while his 345 games are the 18th most in franchise history. Left unprotected by the Suns, Green was drafted by the New Orleans Jazz in the 1974 NBA expansion draft, where he played 15 games before being waived. He then signed with the Virginia Squires of the ABA, where he appeared in 51 games in the 1974–75 season. Green was waived by the Squires on September 30, 1975.

== Career statistics ==
Legend
GP	Games played	MPG	Minutes per game
FG%	Field-goal percentage	FT%	Free-throw percentage
RPG	Rebounds per game	APG	Assists per game
SPG	Steals per game	BPG	Blocks per game
PPG	Points per game	**Bold**	Career high

=== Regular season ===
Year	Team	GP	MPG	FG%	3P%	FT%	RPG	APG	SPG	BPG	PPG
1969–70	Phoenix	58	12.1	.432		.586	4.8	0.3			4.2
1970–71	Phoenix	68	19.5	**.453**		.604	6.9	0.8			5.9
1971–72	Phoenix	67	14.8	.446		.733	5.2	0.7			5.0
1972–73	Phoenix	**80**	**25.6**	.431		**.754**	**9.3**	**1.1**			**6.7**
1973–74	Phoenix	72	15.3	.407		.559	4.9	0.6	**.4**	**.5**	4.1
1974–75	New Orleans	15	18.7	.343		.450	7.3	**1.1**	.3	.3	3.8
1974–75	Virginia (ABA)	51	16.8	.426	–	.741	5.0	0.9	.3	**.5**	5.3
Career		411	17.8	.430	–	.660	6.2	0.8	.4	.5	5.2

=== Playoffs ===
Year	Team	GP	MPG	FG%	FT%	RPG	APG	PPG
1969–70	Phoenix	6	11.5	.286	.400	3.8	0.8	3.0
