= Earl Williams (basketball player) =

American-Israeli professional basketball player (born 1951)

Earl Williams ארל ויליאמס
Personal information
- Born: March 24, 1951 (age 75) Levittown, Pennsylvania, U.S.
- Listed height: 6 ft 8 in (2.03 m)
- Listed weight: 230 lb (104 kg)

Career information
- High school: Woodrow Wilson (Levittown, Pennsylvania)
- College: Winston-Salem State (1970–1974)
- NBA draft: 1974: 3rd round, 49th overall pick
- Drafted by: Phoenix Suns
- Playing career: 1974–1994
- Position: Center
- Number: 14

Career history
- 1974–1975: Phoenix Suns
- 1975–1976: Detroit Pistons
- 1976: New York Nets
- 1977–1978: Alvik BK
- 1978–1979: Boston Celtics
- 1979–1983: Maccabi Tel Aviv
- 1983–1984: Fortitudo Bologna
- 1984–1985: Pallacanestro Brindisi
- 1988–1989: Hapoel Holon
- 1989–1990: Maccabi Ramat Gan
- 1990–1991: Hapoel Holon
- 1992: Maccabi Nazareth
- 1993–1994: Bnei Herzliya

Career highlights
- FIBA Intercontinental Cup champion (1980); EuroLeague champion (1981); 2× Israeli League champion (1982, 1983); 2× Israeli Cup winner (1982, 1983); 2× Israeli League Rebounding Leader (1990, 1991); Israeli league all-time rebound leader
- Stats at NBA.com
- Stats at Basketball Reference

Earl Lee "the Twirl" Williams (Hebrew: ארל ויליאמס; born March 24, 1951) is an American-Israeli former professional basketball player who in 1990 and 1991 was the top rebounder in the Israel Basketball Premier League.

== Early life and education ==
Williams played high school basketball while attending Woodrow Wilson High School in Levittown, Pennsylvania. In 2023, he was inducted into the Bristol Township School District Athletic Hall Of Fame. He played college basketball at Winston-Salem State University, with the Winston-Salem State Rams.

== Professional career ==
=== United States ===
In the 1974 NBA draft, Williams was selected by the Phoenix Suns in the 3rd round, with the 13th pick (49th overall). He made his NBA debut on October 17, 1974, with Phoenix. During the next four years, he played for other NBA teams as well: the Detroit Pistons, the New York Nets, and the Boston Celtics. On September 30, 1975, he was traded by the Suns to the Detroit Pistons, for a 1976 2nd round draft pick (Earl Tatum).

=== Sweden ===
In the 1977–78 season, Williams played for the Swedish League team Alvik. Alvik came in 2nd in the league that year.

=== Israel ===
Williams later played professionally in the Israeli League. He starred for a portion of the time with Maccabi Tel Aviv and Hapoel Holon, and he also played with Maccabi Ramat Gan. In 1990, at age 39, he was the oldest player in the Israeli League. In 1990 and 1991, he was the top rebounder in the Israel Basketball Premier League.

=== Italy ===
Williams played two seasons for Italian teams as well: Fortitudo Bologna in 1984–1985, and Libertas Brindisi in 1988–1989.

== Personal life ==
In 1982, Williams converted to Judaism. Williams also became a naturalized Israeli citizen, becoming a dual US-Israeli citizen.

After ending his active player career at the age of 43, Williams worked as an educator and basketball coach in New Jersey.

He is married to Merav, who is originally from Israel. They have two children.

== Career statistics ==
Legend
| GP | Games played | GS | Games started | MPG | Minutes per game |
| FG% | Field goal percentage | 3P% | 3-point field goal percentage | FT% | Free throw percentage |
| RPG | Rebounds per game | APG | Assists per game | SPG | Steals per game |
| BPG | Blocks per game | PPG | Points per game | **Bold** | Career high |

=== NBA ===
==== Regular season ====
| Year | Team | GP | MPG | FG% | FT% | RPG | APG | SPG | BPG | PPG |
|---|---|---|---|---|---|---|---|---|---|---|
| 1974–75 | Phoenix | **79** | 13.2 | .414 | .437 | **5.8** | **1.2** | .4 | .4 | 4.7 |
| 1975–76 | Detroit | 46 | 12.2 | **.480** | .500 | 5.5 | .4 | .5 | .4 | 3.7 |
| 1976–77 | N.Y. Nets | 1 | 7.0 | .000 | .500 | 2.0 | 1.0 | .0 | **1.0** | 3.0 |
| 1978–79 | Boston | 20 | **13.7** | .439 | **.583** | 5.3 | .6 | **.6** | .5 | **6.1** |
| Career | | 146 | 12.9 | .432 | .475 | 5.6 | .9 | .4 | .4 | 4.5 |
