= Bob Christian (basketball) =

American basketball player (born 1946)

Personal information
- Born: May 11, 1946 (age 80)
- Listed height: 6 ft 10 in (2.08 m)
- Listed weight: 255 lb (116 kg)

Career information
- High school: Weldon (Gladewater, Texas)
- College: Grambling State (1965–1969)
- NBA draft: 1969: 8th round, 109th overall pick
- Drafted by: Atlanta Hawks
- Playing career: 1969–1974
- Position: Center
- Number: 50, 45, 31

Career history
- 1969: Dallas Chaparrals
- 1969: New York Nets
- 1970–1973: Atlanta Hawks
- 1973–1974: Phoenix Suns

Career ABA and NBA statistics
- Points: 944 (3.8 ppg)
- Rebounds: 1,005 (4.1 rpg)
- Assists: 203 (0.8 apg)
- Stats at NBA.com
- Stats at Basketball Reference

Bob Christian (born May 11, 1946) is an American former professional basketball player.

He played collegiately for the Grambling State Tigers.

He was selected by the Atlanta Hawks in the 8th round (109th pick overall) of the 1969 NBA draft.

He played for the Dallas Chaparrals and New York Nets (1969–70) in the ABA for 2 games and for the Hawks (1970–73) and Phoenix Suns (1973–74) in the NBA for 246 games.

== Career statistics ==
Legend
| GP | Games played | GS | Games started | MPG | Minutes per game |
| FG% | Field goal percentage | 3P% | 3-point field goal percentage | FT% | Free throw percentage |
| RPG | Rebounds per game | APG | Assists per game | SPG | Steals per game |
| BPG | Blocks per game | PPG | Points per game | **Bold** | Career high |

=== ABA/NBA ===
==== Regular season ====
| Year | Team | GP | MPG | FG% | 3P% | FT% | RPG | APG | SPG | BPG | PPG |
|---|---|---|---|---|---|---|---|---|---|---|---|
| 1969–70 | Dallas (ABA) | 1 | 7.0 | – | – | – | 1.0 | .0 | | | .0 |
| 1969–70 | N.Y. Nets (ABA) | 1 | 4.0 | .333 | – | – | 2.0 | .0 | | | 2.0 |
| 1970–71 | Atlanta (NBA) | 54 | 9.7 | .433 | | .625 | 3.3 | .6 | | | 2.8 |
| 1971–72 | Atlanta (NBA) | 56 | 8.7 | .465 | | .721 | 3.2 | .5 | | | 3.1 |
| 1972–73 | Atlanta (NBA) | 55 | 13.8 | **.548** | | **.759** | **5.5** | .9 | | | 4.2 |
| 1973–74 | Phoenix (NBA) | **81** | **15.4** | .486 | | .702 | 4.2 | **1.2** | .4 | .2 | **4.8** |
| Career (ABA) | | 2 | 5.5 | .333 | – | – | 1.5 | .0 | | | 1.0 |
| Career (NBA) | | 246 | 12.2 | .486 | | .704 | 4.1 | .8 | .2 | .4 | 3.8 |
| Career (overall) | | 248 | 12.2 | .485 | – | .704 | 4.1 | .8 | .2 | .4 | 3.8 |

==== Playoffs ====
| Year | Team | GP | MPG | FG% | FT% | RPG | APG | PPG |
|---|---|---|---|---|---|---|---|---|
| 1971–72 | Atlanta (NBA) | 6 | 5.7 | .375 | 1.000 | 1.2 | .0 | 1.2 |
