= Fred Saunders =

American basketball player (born 1951)

Personal information
- Born: June 13, 1951 (age 75) Columbus, Ohio, U.S.
- Listed height: 6 ft 7 in (2.01 m)
- Listed weight: 210 lb (95 kg)

Career information
- High school: Mohawk (Columbus, Ohio)
- College: Louisiana (1970–1973); Syracuse (1973–1974)
- NBA draft: 1974: 2nd round, 31st overall pick
- Drafted by: Phoenix Suns
- Playing career: 1974–1978
- Position: Small forward
- Number: 30, 20, 12

Career history
- 1974–1976: Phoenix Suns
- 1976–1978: Boston Celtics
- 1978: New Orleans Jazz

Career NBA statistics
- Points: 1,107 (5.3 ppg)
- Rebounds: 624 (3.0 rpg)
- Assists: 224 (1.1 apg)
- Stats at NBA.com
- Stats at Basketball Reference

James Frederick Saunders (born June 13, 1951) is an American former professional basketball player in the National Basketball Association (NBA).

== Collegiate career ==
Fred Saunders began his collegiate career at University of Louisiana at Lafayette in 1970; in his three years there, he averaged 6.5 points per game. Saunders transferred to Syracuse University for his senior year. At Syracuse University, Saunders averaged 9.8 points per game as a power forward for the Orangemen. The Orangemen finished the season with a record of 17-9 and went on to the NCAA Men's Division I Basketball Championship tournament. At Syracuse, he acquired the nickname "Chocolate Thunder" due to his unique skyhook. Collegiate Stats

== NBA ==
Saunders was selected by the Phoenix Suns in the second round of the 1974 NBA draft with the 31st overall pick. He played power forward for the Suns and the Boston Celtics during the 1970s.

== Career statistics ==
Legend
GP	Games played	GS	Games started	MPG	Minutes per game
FG%	Field goal percentage	3P%	3-point field goal percentage	FT%	Free throw percentage
RPG	Rebounds per game	APG	Assists per game	SPG	Steals per game
BPG	Blocks per game	PPG	Points per game	**Bold**	Career high

=== NBA ===
==== Regular season ====
Year	Team	GP	MPG	FG%	FT%	RPG	APG	SPG	BPG	PPG
1974–75	Phoenix	**69**	15.3	.433	.695	**3.7**	1.2	**.6**	.2	**6.1**
1975–76	Phoenix	17	8.6	.438	.545	2.2	.8	.3	.1	3.6
1976–77	Boston	68	**15.5**	.466	.660	3.3	**1.3**	.4	.1	5.9
1977–78	Boston	26	9.3	.330	**.824**	1.4	.4	.3	.2	2.8
1977–78	New Orleans	30	13.3	**.483**	.632	2.5	1.2	.5	**.3**	5.0
Career		210	13.8	.443	.682	3.0	1.1	.4	.2	5.3

==== Playoffs ====
Year	Team	GP	MPG	FG%	FT%	RPG	APG	SPG	BPG	PPG
1977	Boston	9	7.3	.364	.833	1.0	.6	.1	.0	3.2

== See also ==
- University of Southwestern Louisiana basketball scandal
