= Bill Chamberlain =

American basketball player (1949–2025)

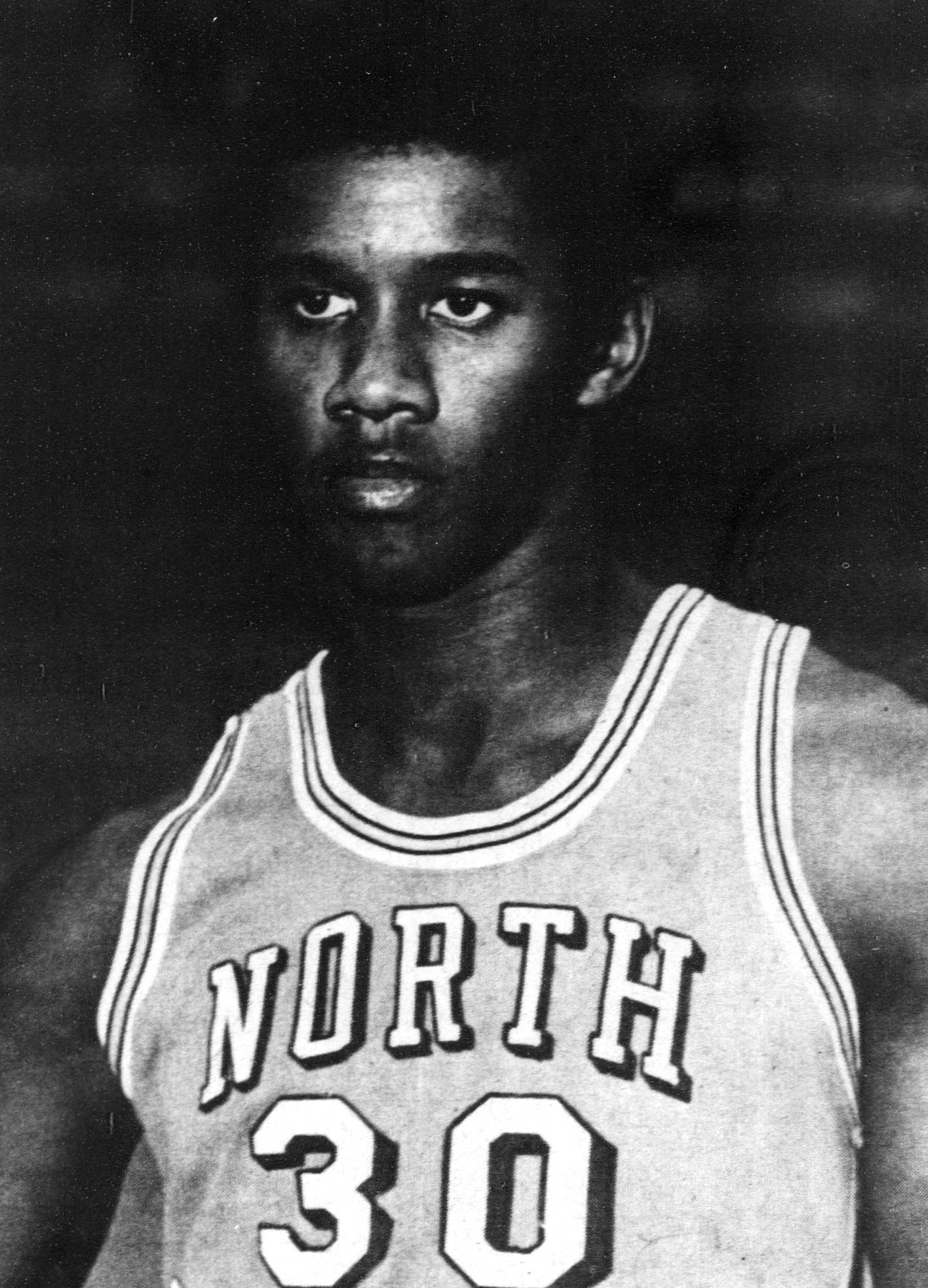
- Chamberlain, circa 1969

Personal information
- Born: December 16, 1949 Long Island, New York, U.S.
- Died: July 13, 2025 (aged 75)
- Listed height: 6 ft 6 in (1.98 m)
- Listed weight: 188 lb (85 kg)

Career information
- High school: Long Island Lutheran (Brookville, New York)
- College: North Carolina (1969–1972)
- NBA draft: 1972: 3rd round, 43rd overall pick
- Drafted by: Golden State Warriors
- Playing career: 1972–1974
- Position: Small forward
- Number: 42, 24

Career history
- 1972–1973: Memphis Tams
- 1973: Kentucky Colonels
- 1973–1974: Phoenix Suns

Career highlights
- Second-team All-ACC (1972)
- Stats at NBA.com
- Stats at Basketball Reference

William Martin Chamberlain (December 16, 1949 – July 13, 2025) was an American professional basketball player in the American Basketball Association (ABA) and the National Basketball Association (NBA). He played college basketball for the North Carolina Tar Heels.

Chamberlain played for the Memphis Tams and Kentucky Colonels (1972–73) of the ABA and the Phoenix Suns (1973–74) of the NBA. He died on July 13, 2025, at age 75.
