= John MacLeod (basketball) =

American basketball coach (1937–2019)

Personal information
- Born: October 3, 1937 New Albany, Indiana, U.S.
- Died: April 14, 2019 (aged 81) Prescott, Arizona, U.S.
- Listed height: 6 ft 0 in (1.83 m)
- Listed weight: 170 lb (77 kg)

Career information
- High school: Providence (Clarksville, Indiana)
- College: Bellarmine (1956–1959)
- Coaching career: 1967–2006

Career history

Coaching
- 1963–1965: Smithville (Ind) High School
- 1965–1967: Indianapolis Cathedral HS
- 1967–1973: Oklahoma
- 1973–1987: Phoenix Suns
- 1987–1989: Dallas Mavericks
- 1990–1991: New York Knicks
- 1991–1999: Notre Dame
- 1999–2000: Phoenix Suns (assistant)
- 2001–2004: Denver Nuggets (assistant/associate)
- 2005–2006: Golden State Warriors (assistant)

Career highlights
- As coach: NBA All-Star Game head coach (1981); Big East Coach of the Year (1997)

Career coaching record
- NBA: 707–657 (.518)
- College: 196–193 (.504)
- Record at Basketball Reference

John Matthew MacLeod (October 3, 1937 – April 14, 2019) was an American basketball coach in the NCAA and the National Basketball Association, most notably with the Phoenix Suns. After coaching for the University of Oklahoma, MacLeod was hired to coach the Suns in 1973. In 1976, he led them to their second postseason in team history, which culminated with an appearance in the 1976 NBA Finals; he would lead the team to eight further postseason appearances in his tenure. In fourteen years, MacLeod led them to 579 wins, which is the most in franchise history.

== Career ==
MacLeod was a star high school basketball player before playing at Bellarmine College.

MacLeod coached the Oklahoma Sooners men's basketball team for six years before being hired to coach the Phoenix Suns in 1973, a position he held until 1987. During this stint, MacLeod was named the head coach of the Western Conference All-Star Team in 1981. After his departure from Phoenix, MacLeod went on to coach the Dallas Mavericks and New York Knicks. In 1991, he was hired to be the head coach of the Notre Dame Fighting Irish, where he won Big East Coach of the Year in 1997. In 1999, MacLeod resigned from his position and returned to Phoenix for one season as an assistant coach. MacLeod spent three seasons as an assistant coach for the Denver Nuggets before ending his coaching career as an assistant for the Golden State Warriors.

MacLeod was inducted into the Indiana Basketball Hall of Fame in 2005 and to the Arizona Sports Hall of Fame in 2016.

MacLeod was inducted into the Phoenix Suns Ring of Honor on April 18, 2012, as the winningest coach in franchise history.

== Head coaching record ==
=== NBA ===
Legend
Regular season	G	Games coached	W	Games won	L	Games lost	W–L %	Win–loss %
Playoffs	PG	Playoff games	PW	Playoff wins	PL	Playoff losses	PW–L %	Playoff win–loss %

Team	Year	G	W	L	W–L%	Finish	PG	PW	PL	PW–L%	Result
Phoenix	1973–74	82	30	52	.366	4th in Pacific	—	—	—	—	Missed Playoffs
Phoenix	1974–75	82	32	50	.390	2nd in Pacific	—	—	—	—	Missed Playoffs
Phoenix	1975–76	82	42	40	.512	3rd in Pacific	19	10	9	.526	Lost in NBA Finals
Phoenix	1976–77	82	34	48	.415	5th in Pacific	—	—	—	—	Missed Playoffs
Phoenix	1977–78	82	49	33	.598	2nd in Pacific	2	0	2	.000	Lost in First Round
Phoenix	1978–79	82	50	32	.610	2nd in Pacific	15	9	6	.600	Lost in Conf. Finals
Phoenix	1979–80	82	55	27	.671	3rd in Pacific	8	3	5	.375	Lost in Conf. Semifinals
Phoenix	1980–81	82	57	25	.695	1st in Pacific	7	3	4	.429	Lost in Conf. Semifinals
Phoenix	1981–82	82	46	36	.561	3rd in Pacific	7	2	5	.286	Lost in Conf. Semifinals
Phoenix	1982–83	82	53	29	.646	2nd in Pacific	3	1	2	.333	Lost in First Round
Phoenix	1983–84	82	41	41	.500	4th in Pacific	17	9	8	.529	Lost in Conf. Finals
Phoenix	1984–85	82	36	46	.439	4th in Pacific	3	0	3	.000	Lost in First Round
Phoenix	1985–86	82	32	50	.390	5th in Pacific	—	—	—	—	Missed Playoffs
Phoenix	1986–87	56	22	34	.393	(fired)	—	—	—	—	—
Dallas	1987–88	82	53	29	.646	2nd in Pacific	17	10	7	.588	Lost in Conf. Finals
Dallas	1988–89	82	38	44	.463	4th in Pacific	—	—	—	—	Missed Playoffs
Dallas	1989–90	11	5	6	.455	(fired)	—	—	—	—	—
New York	1990–91	67	32	35	.478	4th in Atlantic	3	0	3	.000	Lost in First Round
Career		1364	707	657	.518		101	47	54	.465	

=== College ===
Record table
Season	Team	Overall	Conference	Standing	Postseason
Oklahoma Sooners (Big Eight Conference) (1967–1973)
1967–68	Oklahoma	13–13	8–6	T–3rd	
1968–69	Oklahoma	7–19	3–11	8th	
1969–70	Oklahoma	19–9	7–7	T–3rd	NIT Quarterfinal
1970–71	Oklahoma	19–8	9–5	T–2nd	NIT First Round
1971–72	Oklahoma	14–12	9–5	3rd	
1972–73	Oklahoma	18–8	8–6	4th	
Oklahoma:		90–69 (.566)	44–40 (.524)		
Notre Dame Fighting Irish (Independent) (1991–1995)
1991–92	Notre Dame	18–15			NIT Final
1992–93	Notre Dame	9–18			
1993–94	Notre Dame	12–17			
1994–95	Notre Dame	15–12			
Notre Dame Fighting Irish (Big East Conference) (1995–1999)
1995–96	Notre Dame	9–18	4–14	6th (BE 6)	
1996–97	Notre Dame	16–14	8–10	T–4th (BE 6)	NIT Quarterfinal
1997–98	Notre Dame	13–14	7–11	5th (BE 6)	
1998–99	Notre Dame	14–16	8–10	T–8th	
Notre Dame:		106–124 (.461)	27–35 (.435)		
Total:		196–193 (.504)			

== Personal ==
On April 14, 2019, MacLeod died of complications from Alzheimer's disease.
