= Phantom Buzzer Game =

Basketball game in 1969

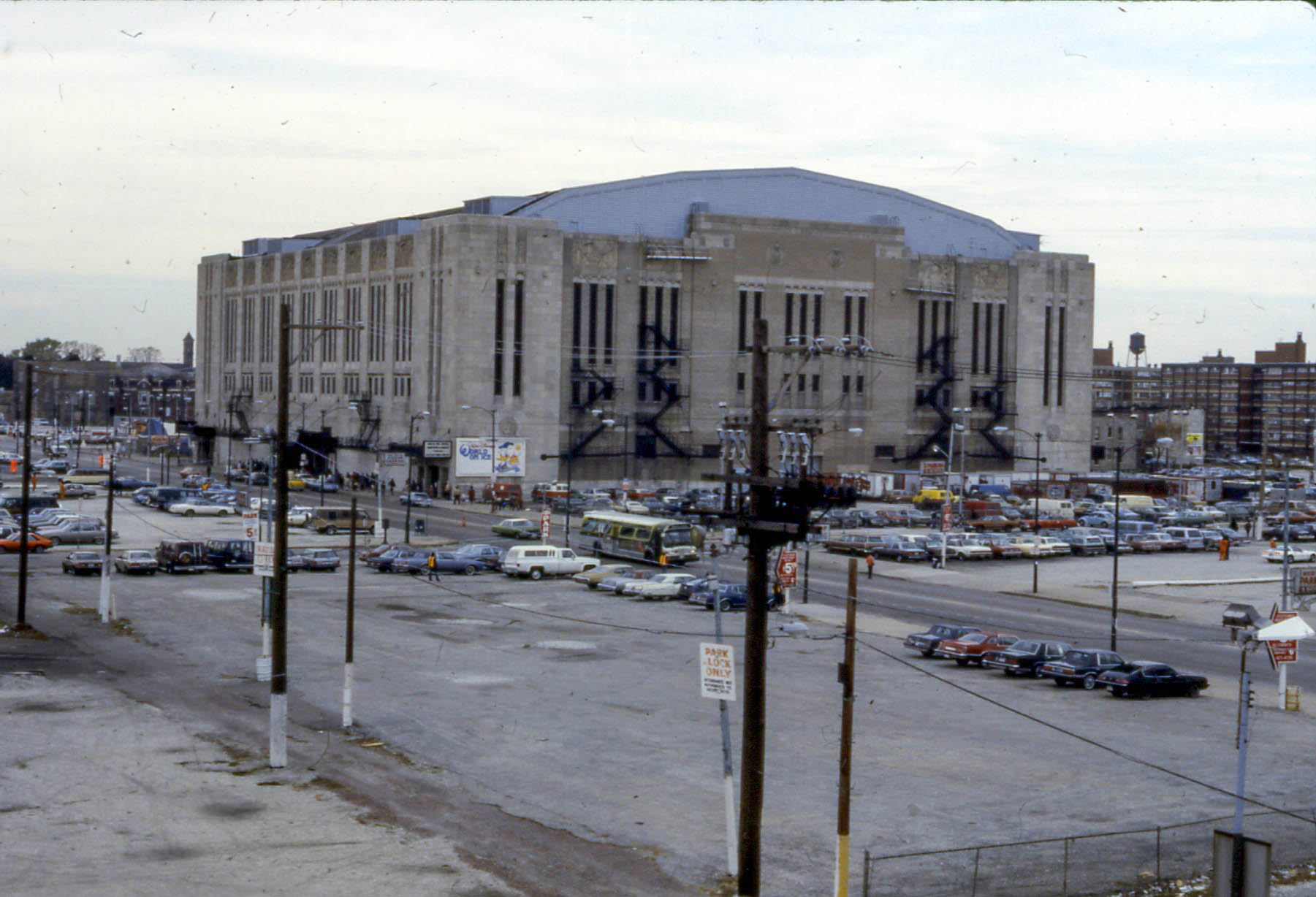
- Chicago Stadium in 1984, ten years before closure, and eleven years before demolition
Atlanta Hawks	Chicago Bulls
142	137
Head coach: Richie Guerin	Head coach: Dick Motta
	1	2	3	4	OT	Total
Atlanta Hawks	26	30	30	38	18	142
Chicago Bulls	26	42	32	24	13	137
- Date: November 6, 1969
- Venue: Chicago Stadium, Chicago, Illinois
- Referees: Jack Madden, Bob Rakel

The Phantom Buzzer Game is the unofficial name of a National Basketball Association game between the Chicago Bulls and Atlanta Hawks on November 6, 1969, at Chicago Stadium. The game was famous for referee Bob Rakel disallowing a game-tying basket because he claimed the buzzer sounded, even though there was one second left on the clock, and also for being the first incident where an official protest was upheld by the NBA.

== The incident and protest ==
Late in the game with time winding down and Atlanta leading 124–122, the Bulls heaved a desperation shot that bounced off the rim, but Bulls center Tom Boerwinkle tipped it in to tie the game at 124 with one second left. Despite this, Rakel waved off Boerwinkle's basket because he claimed he heard the final buzzer go off before it went in.

Bulls coach Dick Motta and GM Pat Williams immediately began protesting to Rakel. Both of them pointed right to the clock on the scoreboard, which showed one second left. Timekeeper Jim Serry outright told Rakel he did not touch the clock or buzzer, and further proving this by flipping the switch to run the clock to zero and allowing the buzzer to sound. While the press corps watched him do it, Rakel and partner Jack Madden, who deferred to him despite later admitting he also did not hear the buzzer sound, refused to budge from his ruling, and walked off the court declaring the game over and Atlanta the winners.

Afterwards, Williams immediately filed an official protest with the NBA. After sorting through the evidence, commissioner Walter Kennedy upheld the protest. It was the first official protest to be upheld by the NBA, and the only one until 1982.

== Playing it out ==
The game was ordered to be continued before the Hawks and Bulls' next scheduled game in Chicago with one second left, the game tied, and Atlanta in possession.

When the suspended contest resumed, the clock ran to zero without the buzzer sounding, because the timekeeper had forgotten to set it. Despite Motta's embarrassment and Hawks coach Richie Guerin's mock protests, the officials working that game declared the second had expired and started the overtime period. The Bulls eventually lost the suspended game 142–137.

== See also ==
- NBA records
