= 1969–70 Seattle SuperSonics season =

NBA professional basketball team season

- Head coach: Lenny Wilkens
- General manager: Bob Houbregs, Zollie Volchok
- Owners: Sam Schulman
- Arena: Seattle Center Coliseum

Results
- Record: 36–46 (.439)
- Place: Division: 5th (Western)
- Playoff finish: Did not qualify
- Stats at Basketball Reference

Local media
- Television: KTNT-TV
- Radio: KOMO

The 1969–70 Seattle SuperSonics season was the 3rd season of the Seattle SuperSonics in the NBA. After the resignation of Al Bianchi, Lenny Wilkens took the role of player-coach and led the team to a 36–46 record, a six win improvement over their previous season and 3 games behind the Chicago Bulls, who got the last playoff spot in the Western Division. Wilkens led the league in assists with 9.1 apg.

== Offseason ==
=== Draft ===
Round	Pick	Player	Position	Nationality	College
1	3	Lucius Allen	G	United States	UCLA
2	18	Ronald Taylor	C	United States	USC
3	32	Lee Winfield	G	United States	North Texas
4	46	Hal Booker	C	United States	Cheyney State
5	60	Jerry King	G	United States	Louisville
6	74	Ben McGilmer	F	United States	Iowa
7	88	Greg Wittman	PF	United States	Western Carolina
8	102	Theartis Wallace	G	United States	Central Washington State
9	116	Vince Fritz	G	United States	Oregon State
10	130	Al Cueto	C	Cuba	Tulsa
11	144	Jim Connolly	F	United States	Bowling Green
12	158	John Smith	F	United States	Puget Sound
13	171	Bob Burrows	G	Canada	Seattle Pacific
14	182	Jerry Conley	G	United States	Morehead State
15	191	Ernie Powell	F	United States	USC
16	197	Danny Cornett	G	United States	Morehead State
17	203	Steve Honeycutt	G	United States	Kansas State

== Roster ==
1969–70 Seattle SuperSonics roster
Players

Pos.	No.	Player	Height	Weight	DOB	From
G	42	Lucius Allen	6 ft 2 in (1.88 m)	175 lb (79 kg)	1947–09–26	UCLA
F	20	Bob Boozer	6 ft 8 in (2.03 m)	215 lb (98 kg)	1937–04–26	Kansas State
F	43	Barry Clemens	6 ft 6 in (1.98 m)	210 lb (95 kg)	1943–05–01	Ohio Wesleyan
G	25	Al Hairston	6 ft 1 in (1.85 m)	170 lb (77 kg)	1945–12–11	Bowling Green
PF	14	Tom Meschery	6 ft 6 in (1.98 m)	215 lb (98 kg)	1938–10–26	Saint Mary's
F/C	41	Dorie Murrey	6 ft 8 in (2.03 m)	215 lb (98 kg)	1943–09–07	Detroit Mercy
F/C	45	Bob Rule	6 ft 9 in (2.06 m)	220 lb (100 kg)	1944–06–29	Colorado State
G/F	10	Dick Snyder	6 ft 5 in (1.96 m)	207 lb (94 kg)	1944–02–01	West Virginia
SG	44	Rod Thorn	6 ft 4 in (1.93 m)	195 lb (88 kg)	1941–05–23	West Virginia
G	19	Lenny Wilkens	6 ft 1 in (1.85 m)	180 lb (82 kg)	1937–10–28	Providence
G	11	Lee Winfield	6 ft 2 in (1.88 m)	174 lb (79 kg)	1947–02–04	Providence

Coaches
Head coach
- Lenny Wilkens

Legend
- (DP) Unsigned draft pick
- (FA) Free agent
- (S) Suspended
- Injured

=== Standings ===
Western Division	W	L	PCT	GB
x-Atlanta Hawks	48	34	.585	–
x-Los Angeles Lakers	46	36	.561	2
x-Chicago Bulls	39	43	.476	9
x-Phoenix Suns	39	43	.476	9
Seattle SuperSonics	36	46	.439	12
San Francisco Warriors	30	52	.366	18
San Diego Rockets	27	55	.329	21

x – clinched playoff spot

== Game log ==
1969–70 game log
Total: 36–46 (Home: 22–14; Road: 10–26; Neutral: 4–6)
October : 1–6 (home: 1–2; road: 0–4)

Game	Date	Team	Score	High points	High rebounds	High assists	Location Attendance	Record
1	October 14	@ New York	L 101–126	Bob Rule (27)	Bob Rule (15)	Lenny Wilkens (5)	Madison Square Garden; 14,796	0–1
2	October 15	@ Atlanta	L 119–124	John Tresvant (29)	John Tresvant (14)	Bob Rule (4)	Alexander Memorial Coliseum; 3,718	0–2
3	October 18	@ Chicago	L 126–131 (OT)	John Tresvant (28)	John Tresvant (11)	Lenny Wilkens, Art Harris (6)	Chicago Stadium; 7,430	0–3
4	October 19	@ Milwaukee	L 106–130	Bob Boozer (26)	Bob Boozer (16)	Lenny Wilkens (6)	Milwaukee Arena; 7,370	0–4
5	October 25	Los Angeles	L 106–130	Bob Rule (19)	Bob Rule (12)	Lucius Allen (8)	Seattle Center Coliseum; 12,536	0–5
6	October 28	Chicago	L 114–116	Lenny Wilkens (28)	Bob Boozer (9)	Lenny Wilkens (17)	Seattle Center Coliseum; 3,620	0–6
7	October 31	Cincinnati	W 129–121	Lenny Wilkens (38)	Dorie Murrey (14)	Lenny Wilkens (12)	Seattle Center Coliseum; 4,016	1–6

November : 5–10 (home: 3–4; road: 2–6)

Game	Date	Team	Score	High points	High rebounds	High assists	Location Attendance	Record
8	November 2	@ Atlanta	L 113–125	Bob Rule (22)			Alexander Memorial Coliseum; 4,101	1–7
9	November 4	@ Detroit	W 116–102	Bob Boozer (28)			Cobo Arena; 2,076	2–7
10	November 7	@ Baltimore	L 112–126	Bob Rule (29)			Baltimore Civic Center; 4,459	2–8
11	November 8	@ Philadelphia	W 125–117	Bob Rule (32)			The Spectrum; 10,363	3–8
12	November 11	@ Chicago	L 100–106	Lenny Wilkens (19)			Chicago Stadium; 8,149	3–9
13	November 13	Detroit	W 117–113	Bob Rule (28)			Seattle Center Coliseum; 4,106	4–9
14	November 14	@ San Diego	L 112–148	Tom Meschery (26)			San Diego Sports Arena; 4,838	4–10
15	November 15	Philadelphia	W 146–136	Bob Rule (49)			Seattle Center Coliseum; 6,679	5–10
16	November 19	Atlanta	L 116–137	Bob Boozer (24)			Seattle Center Coliseum; 5,583	5–11
17	November 21	Milwaukee	L 115–117	Bob Rule (35)			Seattle Center Coliseum; 12,920	5–12
18	November 23	Boston	L 116–125	Bob Rule (33)			Seattle Center Coliseum; 5,538	5–13
19	November 24	@ San Diego	L 105–112	Lenny Wilkens (23)			San Diego Sports Arena; 3,393	5–14
20	November 25	San Francisco	L 106–114	Bob Rule (24)			Seattle Center Coliseum; 4,001	5–15
21	November 29	Phoenix	W 130–129	Bob Rule (33)			Seattle Center Coliseum; 9,418	6–15
22	November 30	@ Phoenix	L 108–116	John Tresvant (21)			Arizona Veterans Memorial Coliseum; 3,621	6–16

December : 8–10 (home: 6–3; road: 2–7)

Game	Date	Team	Score	High points	High rebounds	High assists	Location Attendance	Record
23	December 2	@ New York	L 109–129	Bob Rule (25)			Madison Square Garden; 14,627	6–17
24	December 3	@ Cincinnati	W 118–117	Bob Rule (30)			Cincinnati Gardens; 2,456	7–17
25	December 4	@ Atlanta	L 111–119	Bob Rule (24)			Alexander Memorial Coliseum; 2,931	7–18
26	December 5	@ Milwaukee	L 98–131	Bob Boozer (19)			Milwaukee Arena; 7,064	7–19
27	December 6	Baltimore	W 132–129 (OT)	Bob Rule (40)			Philadelphia, PA; 8,128	8–19
28	December 9	Detroit	W 109–104	Bob Rule (36)			Seattle Center Coliseum; 6,168	9–19
29	December 11	New York	W 112–105	Bob Rule (28)			Seattle Center Coliseum; 10,029	10–19
30	December 12	Phoenix	L 116–130	Tom Meschery (29)			Seattle Center Coliseum; 6,146	10–20
31	December 14	@ Los Angeles	L 127–131	Bob Rule (45)			The Forum; 8,729	10–21
32	December 16	@ San Francisco	L 119–125	Bob Rule (33)			Oakland–Alameda County Coliseum Arena; 3,889	10–22
33	December 17	Cincinnati	W 117–104	Lucius Allen (23)			Seattle Center Coliseum; 4,472	11–22
34	December 19	Philadelphia	W 123–116	Tom Meschery (26)			Seattle Center Coliseum; 6,210	12–22
35	December 21	San Diego	W 112–96	Lucius Allen, Tom Meschery (18)			Seattle Center Coliseum; 6,021	13–22
36	December 23	@ San Francisco	L 115–119	Lucius Allen (19)			Oakland–Alameda County Coliseum Arena; 3,481	13–23
37	December 26	Boston	L 112–122	Bob Rule (41)			Seattle Center Coliseum; 10,273	13–24
38	December 27	New York	L 117–119	Bob Rule (25)			Vancouver, BC; 4,206	13–25
39	December 30	Phoenix	W 134–121	Tom Meschery (24)			Seattle Center Coliseum; 5,201	14–25

January : 6–10 (home: 3–5; road: 3–5)

Game	Date	Team	Score	High points	High rebounds	High assists	Location Attendance	Record
40	January 1	Chicago	L 111–114	Bob Rule (36)			Seattle Center Coliseum; 5,149	14–26
41	January 3	Los Angeles	L 109–126	Bob Rule (26)			Seattle Center Coliseum; 8,677	14–27
42	January 4	Detroit	L 110–116	Dick Snyder (27)			Portland, OR; 3,451	14–28
43	January 6	@ Atlanta	L 97–101	Bob Boozer (21)			Alexander Memorial Coliseum; 3,839	14–29
44	January 9	@ Philadelphia	W 135–132	Lenny Wilkens (31)			The Spectrum; 4,220	15–29
45	January 10	@ Detroit	L 128–129	Tom Meschery (28)			Cobo Arena; 2,346	15–30
46	January 13	Boston	L 102–111	Lucius Allen (23)			Philadelphia, PA; 5,678	15–31
47	January 14	Philadelphia	W 122–110	Dick Snyder (26)			Boston, MA; 4,614	16–31
48	January 16	Chicago	W 119–103	Lenny Wilkens (23)			Kansas City, KS; 3,713	17–31
49	January 17	@ Phoenix	W 134–131	Lenny Wilkens (24)			Arizona Veterans Memorial Coliseum; 9,094	18–31
50	January 22	Phoenix	L 120–129	Bob Rule (31)			Las Cruces, NM; 2,805	18–32
51	January 23	@ Los Angeles	L 100–128	Bob Rule (22)			The Forum; 11,393	18–33
52	January 24	Los Angeles	L 121–122 (OT)	Bob Rule (22)			Seattle Center Coliseum; 9,697	18–34
53	January 28	Atlanta	W 120–119	Dick Snyder (23)			Seattle Center Coliseum; 4,483	19–34
54	January 29	San Francisco	W 105–101	Dick Snyder (24)			Seattle Center Coliseum; 4,010	20–34
55	January 30	@ San Diego	L 117–119 (OT)	Bob Boozer (33)			San Diego Sports Arena; 4,941	20–35

February : 11–6 (home: 8–4; road: 3–2)

Game	Date	Team	Score	High points	High rebounds	High assists	Location Attendance	Record
56	February 1	Milwaukee	W 118 116	Tom Meschery (27)			Seattle Center Coliseum; 12,660	21–35
57	February 3	@ Baltimore	W 120–115	Bob Rule (29)			Baltimore Civic Center; 4,418	22 35
58	February 4	@ Cincinnati	W 121–115	Bob Rule (30)			Cincinnati Gardens; 2,805	23 35
59	February 6	@ Boston	L 117–127	Lenny Wilkens (29)			Boston Garden; 6,109	23–36
60	February 7	@ Detroit	L 109–113	Tom Meschery (21)			Cobo Arena; 3,540	23–37
61	February 8	Philadelphia	W 118–117	Bob Rule (29)			Seattle Center Coliseum; 8,050	24–37
62	February 11	Baltimore	W 119–117	Bob Boozer (23)			Seattle Center Coliseum; 5,810	25–37
63	February 13	Baltimore	W 141–138	Bob Rule (39)			Seattle Center Coliseum; 8,905	26–37
64	February 17	Phoenix	L 118–129	Bob Rule (25)			Seattle Center Coliseum; 8,220	26–38
65	February 18	San Diego	L 119–122	Bob Rule (42)			Eugene, OR; 5,500	26–39
66	February 20	Boston	L 125–127	Bob Rule (27)			Seattle Center Coliseum; 8,614	26–40
67	February 21	Milwaukee	L 127–140	Bob Rule (33)			Portland, OR; 11,139	26–41
68	February 22	San Francisco	W 131–127	Bob Rule (30)			Seattle Center Coliseum; 11,564	27–41
69	February 24	San Francisco	W 130–122	Bob Rule (29)			Seattle Center Coliseum; 4,802	28–41
70	February 25	Atlanta	W 120–112	Bob Rule (27)			Seattle Center Coliseum; 5,685	29–41
71	February 27	@ San Francisco	W 107–99	Lenny Wilkens (22)			Oakland, CA; 4,604	30–41
72	February 28	Chicago	W 140–104	Bob Rule (32)			Seattle Center Coliseum; 13,096	31–41

March : 5–5 (home: 3–1; road: 2–4)

Game	Date	Team	Score	High points	High rebounds	High assists	Location Attendance	Record
73	March 3	San Diego	W 126–114	Dick Snyder (26)			Seattle Center Coliseum; 9,915	32–41
74	March 6	Cincinnati	W 126–122	Dick Snyder (33)			Seattle Center Coliseum; 13,102	33–41
75	March 8	Baltimore	L 106–109	Bob Rule (28)			Seattle Center Coliseum; 13,058	33–42
76	March 9	@ Milwaukee	L 105–124	Bob Rule (19)			Milwaukee Arena; 10,746	33–43
77	March 10	@ New York	L 99–117	Bob Rule (24)			Madison Square Garden; 18,212	33–44
78	March 13	New York	W 115–103	Lenny Wilkens (28)			Portland, OR; 11,035	34–44
79	March 15	@ Cincinnati	L 113–116	Bob Rule (25)			Cincinnati Gardens; 9,640	34–45
80	March 17	@ Chicago	W 109–102	Three players (22)			Chicago Stadium; 9,098	35–45
81	March 20	@ Boston	W 123–119	Dick Snyder (20)			Boston Garden; 10,393	36–45
82	March 22	@ Los Angeles	L 118–121	Bob Rule (33)			The Forum; 13,745	36–46

1969–70 season schedule

== Player statistics ==
Legend
GP	Games played	GS	Games started	MPG	Minutes per game
FG%	Field-goal percentage	3P%	3-point field-goal percentage	FT%	Free-throw percentage
RPG	Rebounds per game	APG	Assists per game	SPG	Steals per game
BPG	Blocks per game	PPG	Points per game

Player	GP	GS	MPG	FG%	3FG%	FT%	RPG	APG	SPG	BPG	PPG
Lucius Allen	81	–	22.4	.442	–	.731	2.6	4.2	–	–	9.8
Bob Boozer ^{[a]}	82	–	31.1	.491	–	.822	8.7	1.3	–	–	15.2
Barry Clemens ^{[a]}	78	–	19.1	.454	–	.793	4.1	1.5	–	–	8.3
Al Hairston	3	–	6.7	.375	–	1.000	1.7	2.0	–	–	2.3
Art Harris ^{[a]}	5	–	35.6	.384	–	.444	3.8	4.0	–	–	12.0
Joe Kennedy	14	–	5.9	.088	–	1.000	1.4	.5	–	–	.6
Tom Meschery	80	–	28.7	.482	–	.790	8.3	2.0	–	–	12.3
Erwin Mueller ^{[a]}	4	–	17.3	.406	–	.444	3.5	1.5	–	–	7.5
Dorie Murrey	81	–	13.3	.446	–	.731	4.4	.9	–	–	5.5
Bob Rule	80	–	37.0	.463	–	.714	10.3	1.8	–	–	24.6
Dick Snyder ^{[a]}	76	–	30.1	.531	–	.810	4.1	4.4	–	–	13.6
Rod Thorn	19	–	5.5	.444	–	.625	.8	.9	–	–	2.9
John Tresvant ^{[a]}	49	–	26.1	.428	–	.735	7.4	1.9	–	–	12.6
Lenny Wilkens ^{[a]}	75	–	37.4	.420	–	.788	5.0	9.1	–	–	17.8
Lee Winfield	64	–	12.0	.479	–	.750	1.5	1.6	–	–	5.7

- ^{a} Statistics with the Seattle SuperSonics.

== Awards ==
- Bob Rule and Lenny Wilkens made their first and seventh All-Star appearances respectively at the 1970 NBA All-Star Game.

== Transactions ==
=== Overview ===
Players Added

Via draft

- Lucius Allen
- Lee Winfield

Via trade

- Bob Boozer
- Barry Clemens
- Dick Snyder
Players Lost

Via trade

- Art Harris
- Erwin Mueller
- Bob Kauffman
- John Tresvant

Waived

- Tommy Kron ^{[^]}

- ^{^} Kron was put on waivers, and after no other team claimed him the Sonics sold him to the Kentucky Colonels of the American Basketball Association.

=== Trades ===
September 5, 1969
To Seattle SuperSonics

Bob Boozer

Barry Clemens

To Chicago Bulls

Bob Kauffman

1971 third round pick

October 26, 1969
To Seattle SuperSonics

Dick Snyder

To Phoenix Suns

Art Harris

November 1, 1969
To Seattle SuperSonics

1970 second round pick

To Detroit Pistons

Erwin Mueller

January 21, 1970
To Seattle SuperSonics

Cash considerations

To Los Angeles Lakers

John Tresvant
