= Walt Wesley =

American basketball player (1945–2024)

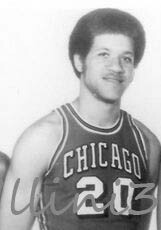
- Wesley with the Chicago Bulls in 1969

Personal information
- Born: January 25, 1945 Fort Myers, Florida, U.S.
- Died: March 28, 2024 (aged 79) Tampa, Florida, U.S.
- Listed height: 6 ft 11 in (2.11 m)
- Listed weight: 220 lb (100 kg)

Career information
- High school: Dunbar (Fort Myers, Florida)
- College: Kansas (1963–1966)
- NBA draft: 1966: 1st round, 6th overall pick
- Drafted by: Cincinnati Royals
- Playing career: 1966–1975
- Position: Center
- Number: 13, 20, 44, 31, 28, 21

Career history
- 1966–1969: Cincinnati Royals
- 1969–1970: Chicago Bulls
- 1970–1972: Cleveland Cavaliers
- 1972–1973: Phoenix Suns
- 1973–1974: Capital Bullets
- 1974: Philadelphia 76ers
- 1974–1975: Milwaukee Bucks
- 1975: Los Angeles Lakers

Career highlights
- Consensus second-team All-American (1966); No. 13 retired by Kansas Jayhawks

Career NBA statistics
- Points: 5,002 (8.5 ppg)
- Rebounds: 3,243 (5.5 rpg)
- Assists: 385 (0.7 apg)
- Stats at NBA.com
- Stats at Basketball Reference

Walter Ivory Wesley (January 25, 1945 – March 28, 2024) was an American professional basketball player in the National Basketball Association (NBA). He played college basketball for the Kansas Jayhawks.

== Early life ==
Wesley grew up in Fort Myers, Florida, the son of Leroy and Josie Wesley. He attended Dunbar High School in Fort Myers.

== College career ==
The top university basketball programs weren't yet recruiting African-American players, but Wesley was recruited by programs in the Midwest. Wesley was quoted, "It's not that we weren't capable, or good enough academically. We just weren't recruited. There was a segregated system, and it was tough. Fortunately, I was recruited by several schools out of the midwest and that's where I chose to go."

The 6-foot-11-inch (211 cm) center chose to attend the University of Kansas and play for its storied program and became a two-time, unanimous selection, All-American.

In his first varsity season as a sophomore in 1963–64, Wesley averaged 10.5 points per game (ppg) and 5.9 rebounds per game (rpg). In his junior year, he became a dominant center, with a career-best 23.5 ppg and 8.8 rpg for the 17–8 Jayhawks.

In his senior season of 1965–66, Wesley averaged 20.7 ppg and a career-best 9.3 rpg as the Jayhawks won the Big 8 championship and were 23–4 overall. In the postseason, Wesley unwittingly found himself in a position that one day inspired the movie Glory Road. In the 1966 Midwest Regional Finals in Lubbock, Texas, the #4-ranked Jayhawks were in a tight game with #2-ranked Texas Western, now the University of Texas at El Paso (UTEP). Wesley set a pick and Jo Jo White made a 30-foot (9.1 m) shot at the buzzer which seemingly sent the Jayhawks to the Final Four. But then a whistle blew, White was ruled as having stepped out of bounds, Texas Western won in double-overtime and would go on to win the title.

On December 18, 2004, his jersey was retired by the University of Kansas and hangs on a banner in Allen Fieldhouse. The banners display the player's surname over his/her number, but the numbers themselves are reused.

=== College statistics ===
Legend
| GP | Games played | GS | Games started | MPG | Minutes per game |
| FG% | Field goal percentage | 3P% | 3-point field goal percentage | FT% | Free throw percentage |
| RPG | Rebounds per game | APG | Assists per game | SPG | Steals per game |
| BPG | Blocks per game | PPG | Points per game | **Bold** | Career high |

| Year | Team | GP | GS | MPG | FG% | 3P% | FT% | RPG | APG | SPG | BPG | PPG |
|---|---|---|---|---|---|---|---|---|---|---|---|---|
| 1963–64 | Kansas | 16 | – | – | .450 | – | .597 | 5.9 | – | – | – | 10.6 |
| 1964–65 | Kansas | 25 | – | – | **.496** | – | .576 | 8.8 | – | – | – | **23.5** |
| 1965–66 | Kansas | **27** | – | – | .478 | – | **.607** | **9.3** | – | – | – | 20.7 |
| Career | | 68 | – | – | .482 | – | .594 | 8.3 | – | – | – | 19.3 |

== NBA career ==
Wesley was chosen in the first round (sixth overall) of the 1966 NBA draft by the Cincinnati Royals.

In his rookie season as a backup center, Wesley played 14 minutes per game, averaging 4.9 ppg and 5.1 rpg. His high-point game was 19 points on March 11, 1967, against the Chicago Bulls. During the 1967–68 and 1968–69 seasons, his playing time and stat line remained about the same, although by his third season his scoring had risen to 7.6 ppg, a season in which he played in all 82 games. On December 15, 1967, he scored a then career-best 22 points on December 15, 1967, against the Detroit Pistons.

He was traded from the Royals to the Bulls for Norm Van Lier in a three-team trade that also involved the Atlanta Hawks on 12 October 1969. His playing time rose to 19.5 minutes per game, and career bests of 9.5 ppg and 6.3 rpg.

After that season, Wesley was selected in the 1970 expansion draft by the Cleveland Cavaliers for the 1970–71 season, his fifth. Becoming the Cavaliers starting center, Wesley had by far his most productive season. Playing in all 82 games, he averaged career-highs of 17.7 ppg and 8.7 rpg, both of which led the Cavaliers. On December 6, 1970, he exploded for a then career-high 36 points against the New York Knicks. But that was just a harbinger for what was to come. On February 19, 1971, Wesley scored 50 points against his first team, the Cincinnati Royals. In the 125–109 Cavaliers win, Wesley poured in 20 field goals and was 10-for-14 from the free throw line.

In 1971–72, Wesley again played all 82 games, with 12.4 ppg and tying his career-best of 8.7 rpg. In 1972–73, after 12 games with the Cavaliers, he was traded to the Phoenix Suns. For the season overall, he played in 57 games but, now in a backup role, he averaged only 3.2 ppg and 2.6 rpg. After the season, he was traded to the Capital Bullets.

For the next three seasons, he continued as a backup, playing just a few minutes per game, for the Bullets, Philadelphia 76ers, Milwaukee Bucks, and one game during 1975–76, his 10th and final NBA season, for the Los Angeles Lakers.

Wesley averaged 8.5 ppg and 5.5 rpg over the course of his career.

== NBA career statistics ==
Legend
| GP | Games played | GS | Games started | MPG | Minutes per game |
| FG% | Field goal percentage | 3P% | 3-point field goal percentage | FT% | Free throw percentage |
| RPG | Rebounds per game | APG | Assists per game | SPG | Steals per game |
| BPG | Blocks per game | PPG | Points per game | **Bold** | Career high |

=== Regular season ===
| Year | Team | GP | GS | MPG | FG% | 3P% | FT% | RPG | APG | SPG | BPG | PPG |
|---|---|---|---|---|---|---|---|---|---|---|---|---|
| 1966–67 | Cincinnati | 64 | – | 14.2 | .393 | – | .423 | 5.1 | 0.3 | – | – | 4.9 |
| 1967–68 | Cincinnati | 66 | – | 13.9 | .465 | – | .500 | 4.3 | 0.5 | – | – | 6.8 |
| 1968–69 | Cincinnati | **82** | – | 16.3 | .459 | – | .647 | 4.9 | 0.6 | – | – | 7.6 |
| 1969–70 | Chicago | 72 | – | 19.5 | .417 | – | .662 | 6.3 | 0.9 | – | – | 9.5 |
| 1970–71 | Cleveland | **82** | – | **29.6** | .455 | – | **.687** | **8.7** | **1.0** | – | – | **17.7** |
| 1971–72 | Cleveland | **82** | – | 26.6 | .410 | – | .674 | **8.7** | 0.9 | – | – | 12.4 |
| 1972–73 | Cleveland | 12 | – | 9.2 | .298 | – | .667 | 3.2 | 0.6 | – | – | 3.0 |
| 1972–73 | Phoenix | 45 | – | 8.1 | .406 | – | .529 | 2.5 | 0.5 | – | – | 3.2 |
| 1973–74 | Capital | 39 | – | 10.3 | .470 | – | .605 | 3.5 | 0.4 | **0.2** | **0.5** | 4.3 |
| 1974–75 | Philadelphia | 4 | – | 8.3 | **.556** | – | .500 | 2.0 | 0.3 | 0.0 | 0.0 | 3.0 |
| 1974–75 | Milwaukee | 41 | – | 5.2 | .440 | – | .609 | 1.3 | 0.3 | **0.2** | 0.1 | 2.1 |
| 1975–76 | Los Angeles | 1 | – | 7.0 | .500 | – | .500 | 1.0 | **1.0** | 0.0 | 0.0 | 4.0 |
| Career | | 590 | – | 17.5 | .434 | – | .630 | 5.5 | 0.7 | 0.2 | 0.3 | 8.5 |

=== Playoffs ===
| Year | Team | GP | GS | MPG | FG% | 3P% | FT% | RPG | APG | SPG | BPG | PPG |
|---|---|---|---|---|---|---|---|---|---|---|---|---|
| 1966–67 | Cincinnati | 3 | – | 7.7 | .200 | – | .000 | 3.0 | 0.0 | – | – | 1.3 |
| 1969–70 | Chicago | **4** | – | **14.8** | **.516** | – | **.500** | **4.8** | **0.5** | – | – | **9.5** |
| 1973–74 | Capital | 1 | – | 1.0 | .000 | – | .000 | 0.0 | 0.0 | 0.0 | 0.0 | 0.0 |
| Career | | 8 | – | 10.4 | .439 | – | .500 | 3.5 | 0.3 | 0.0 | 0.0 | 5.3 |

== Personal life ==
After retiring from the NBA, Wesley served as an assistant coach at the University of Kansas, Western Michigan University, and at the U.S. Military Academy at West Point.

Wesley's jersey was retired by the University of Kansas and Dunbar High School. He was inducted into the Ohio Basketball Hall of Fame, Kansas Hall of Fame, University of Kansas Hall Of Fame, National High School Basketball Hall of Fame, Court of Legends, and the Florida Association of Basketball Coaches. He also received the Alpha Phi Alpha fraternity "Jessie Owens Award of Excellence" for athletic and philanthropic accomplishments, awarded at the 104th Anniversary Convention of Alpha Phi Alpha, Las Vegas, Nevada in July 2010.

In October 2018, Wesley was honored as the Jazz at Lincoln Center Orchestra led by Wynton Marsalis, was commissioned by the Lied Center of Kansas to create a new work honoring 15 KU Basketball Legends. The movement created for Walt was "Walt's Waltz".

Wesley died of leukemia at the H. Lee Moffitt Cancer Center & Research Institute in Tampa, Florida, on March 28, 2024, at the age of 79.
