= Bob Kauffman =

American basketball player and coach

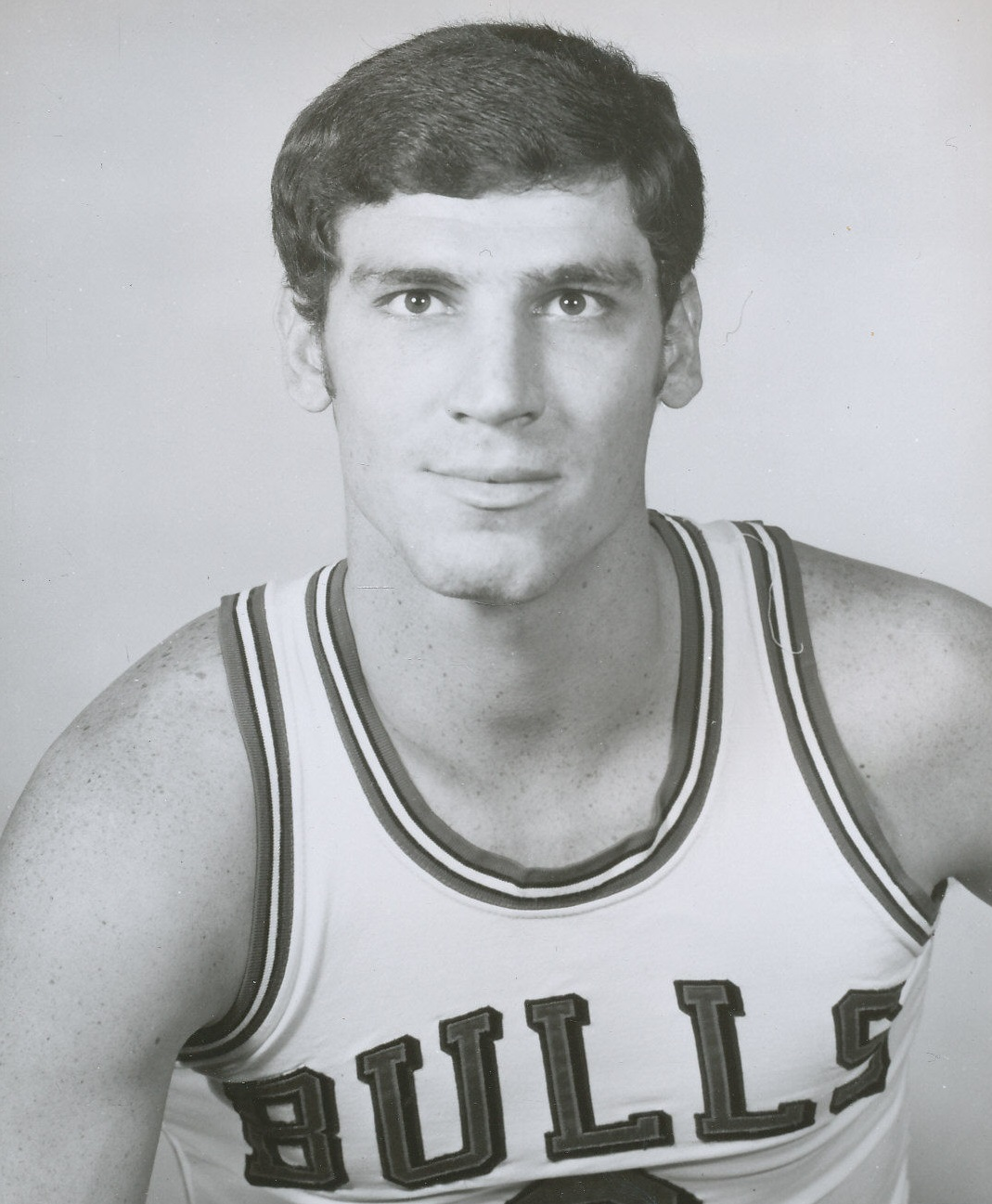
- Kauffman with the Chicago Bulls in 1969

Personal information
- Born: July 13, 1946 Brooklyn, New York, U.S.
- Died: July 25, 2015 (aged 69) Lilburn, Georgia, U.S.
- Listed height: 6 ft 8 in (2.03 m)
- Listed weight: 240 lb (109 kg)

Career information
- High school: Scarsdale (Scarsdale, New York)
- College: Guilford (1964–1968)
- NBA draft: 1968: 1st round, 3rd overall pick
- Drafted by: Seattle SuperSonics
- Playing career: 1968–1975
- Position: Power forward / center
- Number: 22, 6, 44

Career history

Playing
- 1968–1969: Seattle SuperSonics
- 1969–1970: Chicago Bulls
- 1970–1974: Buffalo Braves
- 1974–1975: Atlanta Hawks

Coaching
- 1977–1978: Detroit Pistons

Career highlights
- 3× NBA All-Star (1971–1973)

Career NBA statistics
- Points: 6,049 (11.5 ppg)
- Rebounds: 3,682 (7.0 rpg)
- Assists: 1,429 (2.7 apg)
- Stats at NBA.com
- Stats at Basketball Reference

Robert Kauffman (July 13, 1946 – July 25, 2015) was an American professional basketball player and coach. Kauffman was a three-time NBA All-Star.

== Early life ==
Robert Alan Kauffman was born on July 13, 1946, in Brooklyn, New York, to LeRoy and Anne Kauffman. He attended Scarsdale High School in Scarsdale, New York. The Kauffman family operated a business in the saddle and bridle industry known as Kauffman's Boots and Saddles, located on East 24th Street in Manhattan.

== College career ==
Kauffman played collegiately at NAIA Guilford College in Greensboro, North Carolina, from 1964 to 1968, playing under Coach Jerry Steele.

The 6-foot-8, 240-pound center is credited with turning the Quakers into an NAIA basketball powerhouse. During his four seasons, the Quakers won 86 games with three straight trips to the NAIA Tournament.

Kauffman scored 2,570 points on 64% shooting with 1,801 rebounds in his 113-game career. He averaged 22.7 points and 15.9 rebounds per game in his career. He holds Guilford school records for single-game rebounds (32), single-season rebounds (698, 1967–68), career field goals (943), single-season field goal percentage (.712, 1967–68), single-season free throws (273, 1966–67), career free throws (684), and single-season free-throw attempts (344, 1966–67).

Kauffman graduated with a history degree in 1968.

== Professional career ==
=== Seattle SuperSonics (1968–1969) ===
Kauffman was selected with the third overall pick of the 1968 NBA draft by the Seattle SuperSonics behind future Hall of Fame inductees Elvin Hayes and Wes Unseld. Kauffman was also selected in the 1968 American Basketball Association Draft by the Oakland Oaks, but chose to play in the NBA.

As a rookie for Seattle in 1968–69, Kauffman averaged 7.8 points and 5.9 rebounds, playing behind Bob Rule.

=== Chicago Bulls (1969–1970) ===
On September 5, 1969, Kauffman was traded by the Seattle SuperSonics with a 1971 third round draft pick (Clifford Ray was later selected) to the Chicago Bulls for Bob Boozer and Barry Clemens. Kauffman played a reserve role for the Bulls in 1969–70, averaging 4.3 points and 3.3 rebounds in 12 minutes per game.

=== Buffalo Braves (1970–1974) ===
On May 11, 1970, Kauffman was traded by the Chicago Bulls with Jim Washington to the Philadelphia 76ers for Shaler Halimon and Chet Walker. Kauffman was sent as the player to be named later on May 11, 1970. Later, the expansion Buffalo Braves acquired him and a 1971 second-round draft pick (Spencer Haywood was later selected) from the Philadelphia 76ers on the day of the NBA Expansion Draft in exchange for veteran forward Bailey Howell. Kauffman never played for Philadelphia.

In 1970–1971, playing for the Buffalo Braves, Kauffman became an All-Star, averaging 20.4 points and 10.7 rebounds for the 22–60 Braves under Coach Dolph Schayes. He was a reserve for the first six games of the season, scoring 26 points total, before being inserted into the starting lineup.

The Braves struggled in 1971–1972, again finishing 22–60, but Kauffman was an All-Star for the second time, averaging 18.9 points and 10.2 rebounds. Kauffman had 44 points against Kareem Abdul-Jabbar and the Milwaukee Bucks on November 13, 1971.

Under new Coach Jack Ramsay, Kauffman was an All-Star again in 1972–1973, averaging 17.5 points and 11.1 rebounds for the 21–61 Braves.

In 1973–1974, the Braves improved to 42–40, making the playoffs. Kauffman became a reserve, averaging 6.1 points and 4.4 rebounds in 17 minutes per game, on a roster that included Hall of Famer Bob McAdoo, Randy Smith, and Gar Heard.

=== Atlanta Hawks (1974–1975) ===
On May 20, 1974, Kauffman was drafted by the New Orleans Jazz from the Buffalo Braves in the NBA expansion draft. He was immediately traded by the Jazz in a landmark trade. He was traded with Dean Meminger, a 1974 first round draft pick (Mike Sojourner was later selected), a 1975 first round draft pick (David Thompson was later selected), a 1975 second round draft pick (Bill Willoughby was later selected), a 1976 second round draft pick (Alex English was later selected), and a 1980 third round draft pick (Jonathan Moore was later selected) to the Atlanta Hawks for Pete Maravich.

With chronic groin and hip problems limiting his play, Kauffman played the final season of his career with the 1974–1975 Hawks. He averaged 3.9 points and 2.5 rebounds in 73 games for the 31–51 Hawks, under Coach Cotton Fitzsimmons.

=== Career totals ===
Kauffman played seven seasons in the NBA as a member of the Sonics, Chicago Bulls, Buffalo Braves, and Atlanta Hawks. A three-time All-Star (1971, 1972, and 1973), Kauffman averaged 11.5 points and 7.0 rebounds for his career. He had his statistically strongest season in 1970–71, when he averaged 20.4 points and 10.7 rebounds for the Braves.

== NBA career statistics ==
Legend
GP	Games played	GS	Games started	MPG	Minutes per game
FG%	Field goal percentage	3P%	3-point field goal percentage	FT%	Free throw percentage
RPG	Rebounds per game	APG	Assists per game	SPG	Steals per game
BPG	Blocks per game	PPG	Points per game	**Bold**	Career high

=== Regular season ===
Year	Team	GP	GS	MPG	FG%	3P%	FT%	RPG	APG	SPG	BPG	PPG
1968–69	Seattle	**82**	–	20.2	442	–	.702	5.9	1.0	–	–	7.8
1969–70	Chicago	64	–	12.1	.425	–	.715	3.3	1.2	–	–	4.3
1970–71	Buffalo	78	–	35.6	.471	–	.740	10.7	4.5	–	–	**20.4**
1971–72	Buffalo	77	–	**41.6**	.497	–	**.795**	10.2	3.9	–	–	18.9
1972–73	Buffalo	77	–	39.6	**.505**	–	.780	**11.1**	**5.1**	–	–	17.5
1973–74	Buffalo	74	–	17.6	.467	–	.713	4.4	1.9	**.5**	**.2**	6.1
1974–75	Atlanta	73	–	10.9	.433	–	.702	2.5	1.1	.3	.1	3.9
Career		525	–	25.8	.477	–	.749	7.0	2.7	.4	.1	11.5
All-Star		3	0	6.7	.400	–	.500	.7	.7	–	–	1.7

=== Playoffs ===
Year	Team	GP	GS	MPG	FG%	3P%	FT%	RPG	APG	SPG	BPG	PPG
1970	Chicago	**3**	–	4.7	.333	–	**.667**	**2.0**	**1.3**	–	–	**1.3**
1974	Buffalo	2	–	**5.0**	.333	–	.000	.5	1.0	.0	.0	1.0
Career		5	–	4.8	.333	–	.400	1.4	1.2	.0	.0	1.2

== NBA executive/coaching career ==
He had a short career as an NBA team executive with the Atlanta Hawks and Detroit Pistons. He spent two seasons as assistant general manager for the Hawks before Detroit hired him as the Pistons' general manager in 1977. He was with the Pistons from May 25, 1977, to July 14, 1978.

He served as coach of the Detroit Pistons in 1977–1978 after Herb Brown was fired, going 29–29 in 58 games. Kauffman eventually left the Pistons after a disagreement with team owner Bill Davidson. Kauffman wanted to hire Cotton Fitzsimmons or Al Bianchi for the coaching vacancy. Davidson wanted Dick Vitale from the University of Detroit. Vitale went 34–60 in his tenure as Pistons coach.

== Death ==
Kauffman died at the age of 69. He was survived by his wife, Judy and four daughters; Lara, Joannah, Carey, and Kate.

== Honors ==
- Kauffman was inducted into Guilford's Athletics Hall of Fame in 1973.
- Guilford College retired his jersey (#44) in 2009.

== Head coaching record ==
Legend
Regular season	G	Games coached	W	Games won	L	Games lost	W–L %	Win–loss %
Playoffs	PG	Playoff games	PW	Playoff wins	PL	Playoff losses	PW–L %	Playoff win–loss %

Team	Year	G	W	L	W–L%	Finish	PG	PW	PL	PW–L%	Result
Detroit	1977–78	58	29	29	.500	4th in Midwest	—	—	—	—	Missed playoffs
Career		58	29	29	.500		—	—	—	—	
