= 1969–70 San Francisco Warriors season =

NBA professional basketball team season

- Head coach: George Lee (22–30); Al Attles (8–22)
- Arena: Cow Palace

Results
- Record: 30–52 (.366)
- Place: Division: 6th (Western)
- Playoff finish: Did not qualify
- Stats at Basketball Reference

The 1969–70 San Francisco Warriors season was the Warriors' 24th season in the NBA and 8th in the San Francisco Bay Area.

== Roster ==
1969–70 San Francisco Warriors roster
Players

Pos.	No.	Player	Height	Weight	DOB	From
G	16	Al Attles	6 ft 0 in (1.83 m)	175 lb (79 kg)		North Carolina A&T
F	31	Joe Ellis	6 ft 6 in (1.98 m)	175 lb (79 kg)		San Francisco
F	20	Dave Gambee	6 ft 6 in (1.98 m)	215 lb (98 kg)		Oregon State
F/C	43	Clyde Lee	6 ft 10 in (2.08 m)	205 lb (93 kg)		Vanderbilt
G	15	Bobby Lewis	6 ft 3 in (1.91 m)	175 lb (79 kg)		North Carolina
F/C	32	Jerry Lucas	6 ft 8 in (2.03 m)	230 lb (104 kg)		Ohio State
G	23	Jeff Mullins	6 ft 4 in (1.93 m)	190 lb (86 kg)		Duke
G/F	33	Bob Portman	6 ft 5 in (1.96 m)	200 lb (91 kg)		Creighton
C	54	Dale Schlueter	6 ft 10 in (2.08 m)	225 lb (102 kg)		Colorado State
G	10	Adrian Smith	6 ft 1 in (1.85 m)	180 lb (82 kg)		Kentucky
F/C	42	Nate Thurmond	6 ft 11 in (2.11 m)	225 lb (102 kg)		Bowling Green
F	22	Bill Turner	6 ft 7 in (2.01 m)	220 lb (100 kg)		Akron
G	12	Ron Williams	6 ft 3 in (1.91 m)	188 lb (85 kg)		West Virginia

Coaches
Head coach
- Al Attles (North Carolina A&T)

Legend
- (DP) Unsigned draft pick
- (FA) Free agent
- (S) Suspended
- Injured

== Regular season ==
=== Season standings ===
Western Division	W	L	PCT	GB
x-Atlanta Hawks	48	34	.585	–
x-Los Angeles Lakers	46	36	.561	2
x-Chicago Bulls	39	43	.476	9
x-Phoenix Suns	39	43	.476	9
Seattle SuperSonics	36	46	.439	12
San Francisco Warriors	30	52	.366	18
San Diego Rockets	27	55	.329	21

=== Game log ===
1969–70 Game log
#	Date	Opponent	Score	High points	Record
1	October 18	San Diego	125–124 (OT)	Joe Ellis (29)	0–1
2	October 22	@ Atlanta	94–93	Jeff Mullins (24)	1–1
3	October 23	@ New York	112–109	Jeff Mullins (27)	2–1
4	October 25	Milwaukee	104–118	Jeff Mullins (30)	3–1
5	October 29	Chicago	101–87	Jeff Mullins (29)	3–2
6	November 1	Cincinnati	97–120	Jeff Mullins (38)	4–2
7	November 4	@ Baltimore	105–124	Jeff Mullins (28)	4–3
8	November 6	@ Cincinnati	130–109	Jeff Mullins (26)	5–3
9	November 7	@ Boston	111–110	Jeff Mullins (26)	6–3
10	November 8	@ Atlanta	93–106	Nate Thurmond (21)	6–4
11	November 10	N San Diego	99–100	Nate Thurmond (30)	6–5
12	November 11	New York	116–103	Jeff Mullins (30)	6–6
13	November 14	Atlanta	120–109	Nate Thurmond (25)	6–7
14	November 15	@ Chicago	105–124	Jeff Mullins (28)	6–8
15	November 16	@ Milwaukee	123–129 (OT)	Nate Thurmond (26)	6–9
16	November 18	Milwaukee	110–127	Nate Thurmond (26)	7–9
17	November 21	Boston	115–118	Nate Thurmond (30)	8–9
18	November 22	Los Angeles	106–98	Jeff Mullins (26)	8–10
19	November 25	@ Seattle	114–106	Nate Thurmond (29)	9–10
20	November 26	@ San Diego	126–125 (OT)	Nate Thurmond (32)	10–10
21	November 27	Baltimore	118–116	Jeff Mullins (42)	10–11
22	November 28	@ Los Angeles	114–108	Joe Ellis (31)	11–11
23	December 2	Detroit	109–116	Nate Thurmond (36)	12–11
24	December 3	Detroit	106–102	Jeff Mullins (31)	12–12
25	December 5	San Diego	107–112	Jeff Mullins (31)	13–12
26	December 9	N Atlanta	115–117	Nate Thurmond (34)	13–13
27	December 11	N Chicago	104–110	Jeff Mullins (23)	13–14
28	December 12	@ Milwaukee	109–123	Jeff Mullins (20)	13–15
29	December 13	@ Detroit	104–97	Nate Thurmond (27)	14–15
30	December 16	Seattle	119–125	Jeff Mullins (31)	15–15
31	December 19	@ San Diego	111–119	Joe Ellis (32)	15–16
32	December 20	Philadelphia	122–109	Bob Portman (23)	15–17
33	December 23	Seattle	115–119	Nate Thurmond (32)	16–17
34	December 25	@ Cincinnati	124–120 (OT)	Jeff Mullins (34)	17–17
35	December 26	@ Philadelphia	121–141	Adrian Smith (23)	17–18
36	December 27	@ Baltimore	112–147	Ron Williams (27)	17–19
37	December 28	N Philadelphia	112–138	Dave Gambee (20)	17–20
38	December 30	Los Angeles	100–105	Nate Thurmond (29)	18–20
39	January 2	@ Los Angeles	95–125	Nate Thurmond (20)	18–21
40	January 3	Chicago	102–116	Jeff Mullins (28)	19–21
41	January 5	Detroit	102–118	Nate Thurmond (29)	20–21
42	January 7	New York	99–94	Jeff Mullins (29)	20–22
43	January 8	@ San Diego	103–120	Attles, Ellis (22)	20–23
44	January 9	New York	123–93	Jeff Mullins (33)	20–24
45	January 13	@ Detroit	102–115	Jeff Mullins (36)	20–25
46	January 14	@ Atlanta	103–101	Dave Gambee (24)	21–25
47	January 16	@ Philadelphia	105–127	Jeff Mullins (16)	21–26
48	January 18	@ Milwaukee	107–123	Ron Williams (26)	21–27
49	January 22	N Los Angeles	108–122	Joe Ellis (38)	21–28
50	January 23	@ Phoenix	138–132	Dave Gambee (27)	22–28
51	January 24	Phoenix	109–99	Jerry Lucas (18)	22–29
52	January 26	Atlanta	131–104	Adrian Smith (15)	22–30
53	January 29	@ Seattle	101–105	Joe Ellis (23)	22–31
54	January 30	Phoenix	116–125	Clyde Lee (25)	23–31
55	February 1	@ Boston	123–105	Jeff Mullins (31)	24–31
56	February 3	@ New York	98–118	Jerry Lucas (20)	24–32
57	February 5	@ Chicago	127–105	Joe Ellis (26)	25–32
58	February 6	@ Phoenix	117–122	Jerry Lucas (35)	25–33
59	February 7	Philadelphia	115–111	Jerry Lucas (33)	25–34
60	February 10	Atlanta	104–113	Jerry Lucas (22)	26–34
61	February 11	Los Angeles	125–115	Jerry Lucas (26)	26–35
62	February 13	Cincinnati	128–110	Jerry Lucas (25)	26–36
63	February 14	@ San Diego	123–141	Ron Williams (25)	26–37
64	February 16	N Boston	114–117	Lucas, Mullins (24)	26–38
65	February 18	Milwaukee	109–102	Jeff Mullins (26)	26–39
66	February 21	Boston	111–116	Jeff Mullins (32)	27–39
67	February 22	@ Seattle	127–131	Joe Ellis (34)	27–40
68	February 24	@ Seattle	122–130	Ron Williams (23)	27–41
69	February 25	Chicago	112–104	Jerry Lucas (20)	27–42
70	February 27	Seattle	107–99	Joe Ellis (28)	27–43
71	March 1	@ Detroit	99–116	Clyde Lee (23)	27–44
72	March 3	@ New York	100–115	Jeff Mullins (28)	27–45
73	March 4	@ Boston	110–115	Joe Ellis (25)	27–46
74	March 6	Phoenix	97–107	Jeff Mullins (25)	28–46
75	March 7	Cincinnati	121–119	Jerry Lucas (27)	28–47
76	March 10	@ Los Angeles	104–106	Joe Ellis (24)	28–48
77	March 11	Baltimore	112–115 (2OT)	Mullins, Williams (28)	29–48
78	March 13	Baltimore	114–108	Ron Williams (17)	29–49
79	March 17	@ Phoenix	121–133	Jerry Lucas (25)	29–50
80	March 20	@ Cincinnati	118–111	Jerry Lucas (31)	30–50
81	March 21	@ Baltimore	123–127	Ron Williams (26)	30–51
82	March 22	@ Philadelphia	112–132	Bob Portman (22)	30–52

== Awards and records ==
- Nate Thurmond, NBA All-Star Game
