= Joe Kennedy (basketball) =

American basketball player (born 1947)

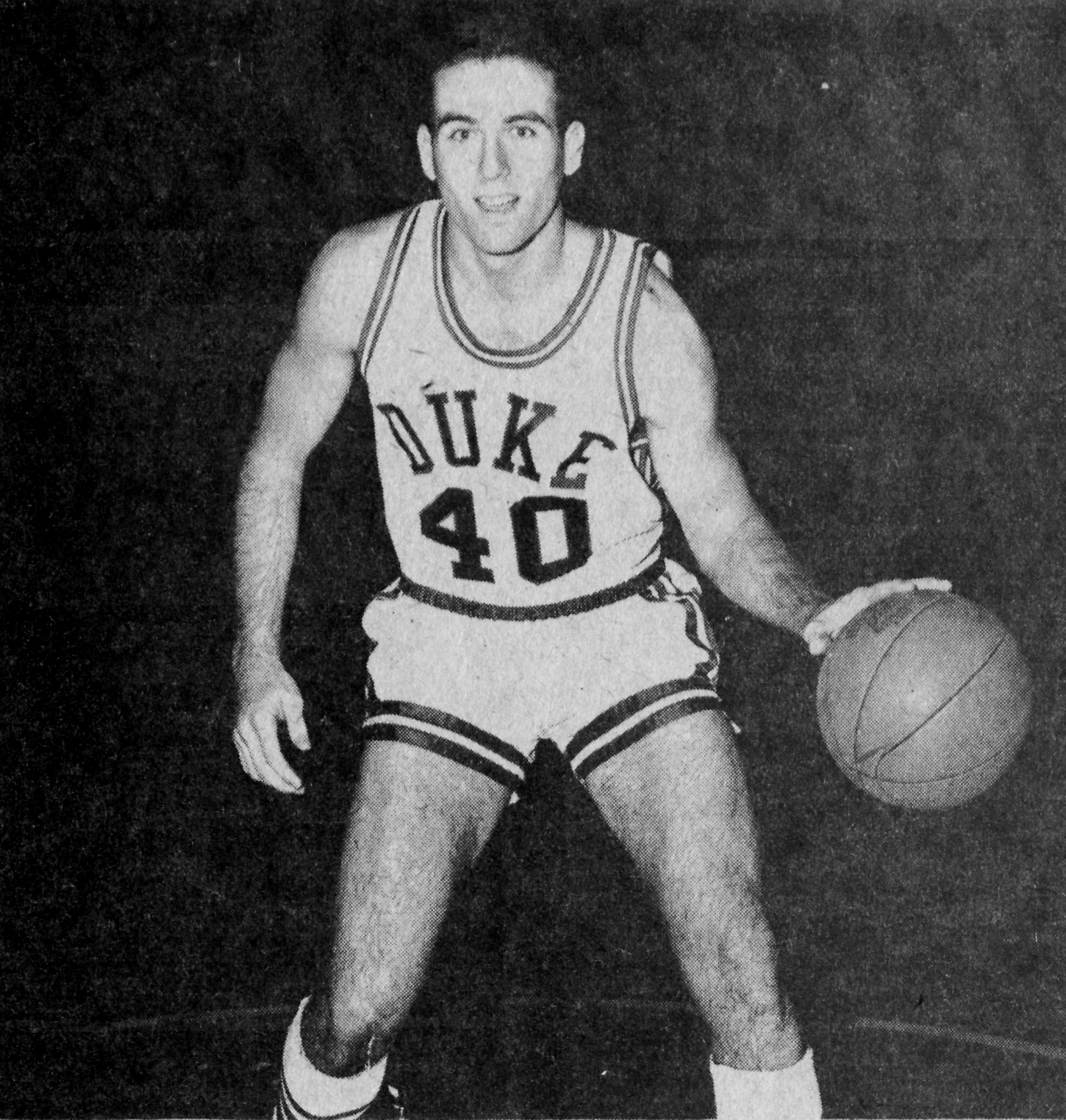
- Kennedy circa 1967

Personal information
- Born: January 12, 1947 (age 79)
- Listed height: 6 ft 6 in (1.98 m)
- Listed weight: 210 lb (95 kg)

Career information
- High school: DeMatha (Hyattsville, Maryland)
- College: Duke (1965–1968)
- NBA draft: 1968: 10th round, 122nd overall pick
- Drafted by: Seattle SuperSonics
- Position: Small forward
- Number: 9

Career history
- 1968–1970: Seattle SuperSonics
- 1970–1971: Pittsburgh Condors
- Stats at NBA.com
- Stats at Basketball Reference

Joseph Aloysius Kennedy (born January 12, 1947) is a retired American professional basketball player who competed in the National Basketball Association (NBA) for two seasons and the American Basketball Association (ABA) for one season. He played college basketball for the Duke Blue Devils, and played professionally for the Seattle SuperSonics of the NBA, and finally the Pittsburgh Condors of the ABA.

== Career statistics ==
Legend
GP	Games played	GS	Games started	MPG	Minutes per game
FG%	Field goal percentage	3P%	3-point field goal percentage	FT%	Free throw percentage
RPG	Rebounds per game	APG	Assists per game	SPG	Steals per game
BPG	Blocks per game	PPG	Points per game	**Bold**	Career high

=== NBA/ABA ===
==== Regular season ====
Year	Team	GP	MPG	FG%	3P%	FT%	RPG	APG	PPG
1968–69	Seattle	72	**17.2**	**.395**		.790	3.3	.8	**6.2**
1969–70	Seattle	14	5.9	.088		**1.000**	1.4	.5	.6
1970–71	Pittsburgh (ABA)	**82**	16.9	.380	.000	.813	**4.2**	**.9**	**6.2**
Career (NBA)		86	15.4	.373		.794	3.0	.8	5.3
Career (overall)		168	16.1	.376	.000	.804	3.6	.8	5.7
