= 1969–70 Phoenix Suns season =

Professional basketball season

- Head coach: Johnny "Red" Kerr (fired); Jerry Colangelo (interim)
- General manager: Jerry Colangelo
- Owners: Karl Eller, Don Pitt, Don Diamond, Bhavik Darji, Marvin Meyer, Richard L. Bloch
- Arena: Arizona Veterans Memorial Coliseum

Results
- Record: 39–43 (.476)
- Place: Division: 4th (Western)
- Playoff finish: Division semifinals (lost to Lakers 3–4)
- Stats at Basketball Reference

Local media
- Television: KTAR-TV
- Radio: KTAR

The 1969–70 Phoenix Suns season was the second season of the Phoenix Suns in the National Basketball Association (NBA). It was the first season, however, for eventual Hall of Famer Connie Hawkins, who was a star in the ABA before switching to the NBA to join the Suns. Head coach Johnny "Red" Kerr was replaced by general manager Jerry Colangelo after the Suns started 15–23. All home games were played at Arizona Veterans Memorial Coliseum.

Hawkins led the Suns in scoring with 24.6 points per game, which was also sixth in the league. He teamed with Dick Van Arsdale's 21.3 points to create the highest-scoring season for a Suns duo until the 1977–78 Suns season, when Paul Westphal and Walter Davis combined for 49.4 points.

After a 16–66 finish in 1968–69, Hawkins and the Suns made a 23-game improvement to 39–43, making their first playoff appearance in only their second season. Facing off against Wilt Chamberlain, Jerry West, Elgin Baylor and the Los Angeles Lakers in the Western Division semifinals, the Suns took an improbable 3–1 lead, before falling to the Lakers in seven games. The Suns wouldn't return to the playoffs again until their cinderella run to the NBA Finals in 1976.

== Offseason ==
=== NBA draft ===
Round	Pick	Player	Position	Nationality	College
1	2	Neal Walk	Center	United States	Florida
2	24	Gene Williams	Forward	United States	Kansas State
3	30	Floyd Kerr	Guard	United States	Colorado State
3	33	Lamar Green	Forward	United States	Morehead State
3	39	Lloyd Kerr	Guard	United States	Colorado State
4	41	Dennis Stewart	Forward	United States	Michigan
5	58	Rich Jones	Forward	United States	Memphis
6	72	Dan Sadlier	Forward	United States	Dayton
7	86	Bill Sweek	Guard	United States	UCLA
8	100	Bob Edwards	Center	United States	Arizona State
9	14	Steve Jennings	Guard	United States	USC
10	128	Rich Abrahamson	Guard	United States	Oregon
11	142	Fred Lind	Forward	United States	Duke
12	156	Bob Miller	Forward	United States	Toledo
13	169	Andy White	Guard	United States	UTEP
14	180	Marv Schmidt	Guard	United States	Western New Mexico
15	189	Bob Beamon	Guard	United States	UTEP
16	195	Wayne Huckel	Guard	United States	Davidson
17	201	Howie Dickenman	Center	United States	Central Connecticut
18	207	Al Nuness	Guard	United States	Minnesota
19	212	Solomon Davis	Forward	United States	Kentucky State
20	216	Jim Plump	Forward	United States	Northern Arizona

Prior to the inception of the NBA draft lottery, the first pick in the draft was decided by a coin flip between the teams with the worst record in the league's two divisions. The NBA's two expansion teams from 1968, the Suns (16–66) and the Milwaukee Bucks (27–55), finished last in the Western Division and Eastern Division, respectively. Prior to the flip, Suns general manager Jerry Colangelo chose "heads", losing the first pick to the Bucks when the coin landed "tails". According to Jerry Colangelo, the coin flip originally landed on heads from what he heard on the phone, but then-commissioner J. Walter Kennedy flip the coin onto his hand to showcase tails instead. The Bucks would select prized UCLA center Lew Alcindor (later Kareem Abdul-Jabbar) with the first pick. Alcindor, in three years at UCLA, led the Bruins to three national championships and an 88–2 record. Considered by many to be the greatest college basketball player of all time, Abdul-Jabbar would lead the Bucks to a championship in just his second season, and would eventually win six Most Valuable Player awards, six NBA Championships, and retire as the NBA's all-time leading scorer.

The Suns would use the second pick to select center Neal Walk from Florida. Walk averaged 25.2 points and 18.4 rebounds per game in his final two seasons with the Gators. Walk would play five seasons with the Suns before being traded to the New Orleans Jazz in 1974. While overshadowed by Abdul-Jabbar, Walk was productive for the Suns, averaging a double-double in two consecutive seasons (20.2 points and 12.4 rebounds in 1972–73 and 16.8 points and 10.2 rebounds in 1973–74). The only other draft pick who played for the franchise was Lamar Green, who, like Walk, would play five seasons with the Suns before being drafted by the Jazz in the 1974 expansion draft. "Leapin' Lamar" was known for his vertical leap and rebounding ability, averaging a career high 9.3 rebounds per game in 1972–73 while playing 25.6 minutes a game. In the fifteenth round, the Suns selected Bob Beamon, a famous track and field athlete who broke Jesse Owens' 25-year world record in the long jump at the 1968 Summer Olympics.

=== Free agency ===
Despite losing the number one draft pick to the Bucks, the Suns would win another significant coin flip. The Suns bested the Seattle SuperSonics for the rights to ABA star Connie Hawkins. In his freshman year with Iowa, Hawkins was implicated, without evidence, in a point shaving scandal, which led to his expulsion from the university. While eligible, Hawkins went undrafted in the 1964, 1965 and 1966 NBA drafts, before being officially barred from the league. Hawkins would star in the upstart American Basketball League (ABL), winning the Most Valuable Player Award in the ABL's inaugural 1961–62 season. Hawkins would then spend four years with the Harlem Globetrotters, before joining the Pittsburgh Pipers of the upstart American Basketball Association (ABA) in 1967. Hawkins led the league in scoring, while leading the Pipers to the first ABA championship, and receiving the ABA's first Most Valuable Player Award in 1968. In 1966, Hawkins' attorneys filed a $6 million anti-trust lawsuit against the NBA. In 1969, a Time Magazine article absolved Hawkins from involvement in the point shaving scandal, leading the NBA to pay a $1.3 million settlement and allow Hawkins into the league. "The Hawk" would become the Suns first official star, making the All-NBA First Team in 1970, and appearing in four consecutive All-Star Games. On November 19, 1976, Hawkins became the first player in Suns franchise history to have his number retired. On September 11, 1969, the Suns waived swingman Bob Warlick. Warlick would sign as a free agent with the Los Angeles Stars of the ABA. On October 1, 1969, Dave "Big Daddy D" Lattin was waived. Lattin would later sign with the Pittsburgh Condors of the ABA.

=== Trades ===
On May 8, 1969, the Suns traded Gary Gregor to the Atlanta Hawks for Paul Silas. Gregor, the Suns first draft pick, was named to the All-Rookie Team in 1969 after averaging 11.1 points and 8.9 rebounds per game. Silas would join Connie Hawkins and Jim Fox to form a formidable starting frontcourt that would combine to average over 50 points and 29 rebounds a game. As a Sun, Silas would become an All-Star, and be selected to two All-Defensive teams. The Suns also traded the rights to expansion draft picks Bill Melchionni and Bumper Tormohlen for a 1970 second-round draft pick (Joe DePre) and a 1970 third-round draft pick (Vann Williford). Neither pick would play for the franchise.

== Roster ==
1969–70 Phoenix Suns roster
Players

Pos.	No.	Player	Height	Weight	DOB	From
F	44	Jerry Chambers	6 ft 5 in (1.96 m)	185 lb (84 kg)	1943-07-18	Utah
C	31	Jim Fox	6 ft 10 in (2.08 m)	230 lb (104 kg)	1943-04-07	South Carolina
G	25	Gail Goodrich	6 ft 1 in (1.85 m)	170 lb (77 kg)	1943-04-23	UCLA
F	16	Lamar Green	6 ft 7 in (2.01 m)	210 lb (95 kg)	1947-03-22	Morehead State
G	23	Art Harris	6 ft 4 in (1.93 m)	185 lb (84 kg)	1947-01-13	Stanford
F	42	Connie Hawkins	6 ft 8 in (2.03 m)	210 lb (95 kg)	1942-07-17	Iowa
F	11	Neil Johnson	6 ft 7 in (2.01 m)	220 lb (100 kg)	1943-04-17	Creighton
G/F	40	Stan McKenzie	6 ft 5 in (1.96 m)	195 lb (88 kg)	1944-10-06	NYU
F	29	Paul Silas	6 ft 7 in (2.01 m)	220 lb (100 kg)	1943-07-12	Creighton
G/F	5	Dick Van Arsdale	6 ft 5 in (1.96 m)	210 lb (95 kg)	1943-02-22	Indiana
C	41	Neal Walk	6 ft 10 in (2.08 m)	220 lb (100 kg)	1948-07-29	Florida

Coaches
Head coach
- Jerry Colangelo (Illinois)

Legend
- (DP) Unsigned draft pick
- (FA) Free agent
- (S) Suspended
- Injured

== Regular season ==
=== Standings ===
Western Division	W	L	PCT	GB
x-Atlanta Hawks	48	34	.585	–
x-Los Angeles Lakers	46	36	.561	2
x-Chicago Bulls	39	43	.476	9
x-Phoenix Suns	39	43	.476	9
Seattle SuperSonics	36	46	.439	12
San Francisco Warriors	30	52	.366	18
San Diego Rockets	27	55	.329	21

=== Game log ===
1969–70 game log
Total: 39–43 (home: 25–16; road: 14–27)
October: 3–5 (home: 2–2; road: 1–3)

Game	Date	Team	Score	High points	High rebounds	High assists	Location Attendance	Record
1	October 16	San Diego	W 116–114	Jim Fox (29)	Paul Silas (15)	Gail Goodrich (9)	Arizona Veterans Memorial Coliseum; 6,053	1–0
2	October 18	@ Atlanta	L 116–121	Gail Goodrich (28)	Paul Silas (23)	Connie Hawkins (7)	Alexander Memorial Coliseum; 3,742	1–1
3	October 21	@ New York	L 116–140	Connie Hawkins (27)	Jim Fox (12)	Gail Goodrich (8)	Madison Square Garden; 15,116	1–2
4	October 22	@ Philadelphia	L 119–122	Gail Goodrich (24)	Connie Hawkins (16)	Gail Goodrich (19)	The Spectrum; 7,215	1–3
5	October 24	Chicago	L 115–116 (OT)	Jim Fox (28)	Jim Fox (14)	Connie Hawkins (10)	Arizona Veterans Memorial Coliseum; 4,576	1–4
6	October 25	@ San Diego	W 115–107	Gail Goodrich (31)	Paul Silas (16)	Gail Goodrich (13)	San Diego Sports Arena; 5,269	2–4
7	October 26	Milwaukee	L 99–119	Jim Fox (22)	Connie Hawkins (14)	Dick Van Arsdale (5)	Arizona Veterans Memorial Coliseum; 9,149	2–5
8	October 30	Cincinnati	W 106–104	Gail Goodrich (27)	Neal Walk (13)	Gail Goodrich (7)	Arizona Veterans Memorial Coliseum; 6,699	3–5

November: 5–10 (home: 4–3; road: 1–7)

Game	Date	Team	Score	High points	High rebounds	High assists	Location Attendance	Record
9	November 4	New York	L 99–116	Connie Hawkins (39)	Paul Silas (9)	Gail Goodrich, Connie Hawkins (4)	Arizona Veterans Memorial Coliseum; 10,552	3–6
10	November 7	@ Los Angeles	W 122–120	Gail Goodrich (37)	Paul Silas (14)	Dick Van Arsdale (7)	The Forum; 10,557	4–6
11	November 9	Detroit	W 140–129	Connie Hawkins (35)	Paul Silas (14)	Gail Goodrich (12)	Arizona Veterans Memorial Coliseum; 9,500	5–6
12	November 13	Philadelphia	L 110–124	Dick Van Arsdale (30)	Jim Fox (14)	Gail Goodrich (7)	Arizona Veterans Memorial Coliseum; 5,440	5–7
13	November 14	@ Los Angeles	L 112–127	Jim Fox (39)	Jim Fox (23)	Connie Hawkins (7)	The Forum; 8,902	5–8
14	November 15	Los Angeles	W 114–111	Gail Goodrich (31)	Connie Hawkins (18)	Gail Goodrich (6)	Arizona Veterans Memorial Coliseum; 6,318	6–8
15	November 16	Atlanta	W 139–118	Connie Hawkins (29)	Paul Silas (15)	Gail Goodrich, Connie Hawkins (8)	University Arena; 5,094	7–8
16	November 18	@ Boston	L 119–120 (OT)	Dick Van Arsdale (32)	Connie Hawkins (17)	Connie Hawkins, Dick Van Arsdale (6)	Baltimore Civic Center; 6,028	7–9
17	November 19	@ Baltimore	L 118–133	Gail Goodrich (29)	Lamar Green (16)	Dick Van Arsdale (11)	The Spectrum; 9,287	7–10
18	November 21	@ Baltimore	L 116–126	Dick Van Arsdale (26)	Connie Hawkins (18)	Gail Goodrich, Connie Hawkins, Dick Van Arsdale (5)	Baltimore Civic Center; 5,215	7–11
19	November 22	@ New York	L 114–128	Dick Van Arsdale (24)	Paul Silas (10)	Gail Goodrich (12)	Madison Square Garden; 19,401	7–12
20	November 23	@ Cincinnati	L 123–137	Jerry Chambers (31)	Connie Hawkins (9)	Gail Goodrich (9)	Cincinnati Gardens; 2,866	7–13
21	November 25	Baltimore	L 124–134	Dick Van Arsdale (30)	Connie Hawkins (16)	Gail Goodrich (10)	Arizona Veterans Memorial Coliseum; 5,776	7–14
22	November 29	@ Seattle	L 129–130	Jim Fox (31)	Jim Fox (13)	Dick Van Arsdale (9)	Seattle Center Coliseum; 9,418	7–15
23	November 30	Seattle	W 116–108	Connie Hawkins (26)	Paul Silas (13)	Gail Goodrich (5)	Arizona Veterans Memorial Coliseum; 3,621	8–15

December: 7–8 (home: 5–4; road: 2–4)

Game	Date	Team	Score	High points	High rebounds	High assists	Location Attendance	Record
24	December 2	Chicago	W 121–110	Dick Van Arsdale (38)	Paul Silas (16)	Gail Goodrich (9)	Salt Palace; 3,220	9–15
25	December 4	Los Angeles	W 119–109	Connie Hawkins (28)	Paul Silas (10)	Gail Goodrich (9)	Arizona Veterans Memorial Coliseum; 5,165	10–15
26	December 5	Chicago	W 114–113	Gail Goodrich (28)	Neal Walk (16)	Gail Goodrich (10)	Arizona Veterans Memorial Coliseum; 6,021	11–15
27	December 7	Detroit	L 113–118	Gail Goodrich (29)	Paul Silas (14)	Gail Goodrich (9)	Arizona Veterans Memorial Coliseum; 4,335	11–16
28	December 9	@ Chicago	L 102–109	Dick Van Arsdale (25)	Paul Silas (14)	Gail Goodrich (8)	Chicago Stadium; 10,833	11–17
29	December 10	@ Baltimore	W 137–107	Jim Fox (24)	Paul Silas (16)	Gail Goodrich (7)	Baltimore Civic Center; 2,842	12–17
30	December 12	@ Seattle	W 130–116	Connie Hawkins (37)	Lamar Green (7)	Gail Goodrich (11)	Seattle Center Coliseum; 6,146	13–17
31	December 13	Cincinnati	W 126–110	Dick Van Arsdale (31)	Jim Fox (12)	Gail Goodrich (12)	Arizona Veterans Memorial Coliseum; 5,786	14–17
32	December 14	Cincinnati	L 130–137 (2OT)	Connie Hawkins (37)	Paul Silas (13)	Gail Goodrich (18)	Arizona Veterans Memorial Coliseum; 7,075	14–18
33	December 16	Philadelphia	L 119–141	Jerry Chambers (23)	Jim Fox, Paul Silas (10)	Gail Goodrich, Art Harris (8)	Arizona Veterans Memorial Coliseum; 5,268	14–19
34	December 20	@ Detroit	L 113–114	Dick Van Arsdale (30)	Paul Silas (12)	Paul Silas (6)	Cobo Arena; 5,021	14–20
35	December 21	@ Milwaukee	L 111–118	Connie Hawkins (28)	Paul Silas (16)	Gail Goodrich (12)	Milwaukee Arena; 10,201	14–21
36	December 25	Boston	W 127–116	Jim Fox (31)	Paul Silas (18)	Gail Goodrich (14)	Arizona Veterans Memorial Coliseum; 10,137	15–21
37	December 28	New York	L 116–135	Connie Hawkins (31)	Paul Silas (12)	Gail Goodrich (11)	Arizona Veterans Memorial Coliseum; 11,286	15–22
38	December 30	@ Seattle	L 121–134	Connie Hawkins (37)	Lamar Green (13)	Gail Goodrich (5)	Seattle Center Coliseum; 5,201	15–23

January: 9–10 (home: 6–4; road: 3–6)

Game	Date	Team	Score	High points	High rebounds	High assists	Location Attendance	Record
39	January 2	San Diego	W 121–120	Connie Hawkins (24)	Connie Hawkins (13)	Gail Goodrich (10)	Arizona Veterans Memorial Coliseum; 4,875	16–23
40	January 3	Detroit	W 114–109	Jim Fox (29)	Paul Silas (11)	Gail Goodrich (10)	Arizona Veterans Memorial Coliseum; 6,551	17–23
41	January 4	@ Los Angeles	L 112–120	Jim Fox (27)	Jim Fox (14)	Connie Hawkins (6)	The Forum; 11,055	17–24
42	January 6	@ Cincinnati	L 124–128	Dick Van Arsdale (30)	Gail Goodrich (10)	Gail Goodrich (10)	Cincinnati Gardens; 3,426	17–25
43	January 8	@ Chicago	L 123–152	Connie Hawkins (29)	Paul Silas (8)	Gail Goodrich (10)	Chicago Stadium; 5,086	17–26
44	January 9	@ Milwaukee	L 116–120	Dick Van Arsdale (26)	Jim Fox (9)	Gail Goodrich, Art Harris, Connie Hawkins (5)	Milwaukee Arena; 7,237	17–27
45	January 10	@ Philadelphia	W 119–117	Dick Van Arsdale (26)	Jim Fox (15)	Gail Goodrich (11)	Baltimore Civic Center; 7,423	18–27
46	January 11	@ Cincinnati	W 125–118	Connie Hawkins (39)	Paul Silas (14)	Art Harris (4)	Omaha Civic Auditorium; 6,129	19–27
47	January 12	New York	L 114–130	Connie Hawkins, Dick Van Arsdale (26)	Connie Hawkins, Paul Silas (13)	Gail Goodrich (6)	Salt Palace; 12,384	19–28
48	January 15	Baltimore	W 124–115	Gail Goodrich, Connie Hawkins (29)	Lamar Green (12)	Gail Goodrich (8)	Arizona Veterans Memorial Coliseum; 5,636	20–28
49	January 17	Seattle	L 131–134	Connie Hawkins (35)	Connie Hawkins (11)	Gail Goodrich (10)	Arizona Veterans Memorial Coliseum; 9,094	20–29
50	January 18	Baltimore	W 134–133	Dick Van Arsdale (30)	Connie Hawkins (11)	Connie Hawkins (8)	Arizona Veterans Memorial Coliseum; 5,009	21–29
All-Star Break
51	January 22	Seattle	W 129–120	Art Harris (23)	Lamar Green (12)	Gail Goodrich, Art Harris (9)	Pan American Center; 2,805	22–29
52	January 23	San Francisco	L 132–138	Connie Hawkins (28)	Connie Hawkins (11)	Gail Goodrich (10)	Arizona Veterans Memorial Coliseum; 12,024	22–30
53	January 24	@ San Francisco	W 109–99	Connie Hawkins (25)	Jim Fox (15)	Gail Goodrich, Connie Hawkins (5)	Oakland–Alameda County Coliseum Arena; 6,466	23–30
54	January 25	@ Los Angeles	L 106–118	Gail Goodrich (22)	Connie Hawkins (10)	Connie Hawkins (10)	The Forum; 11,483	23–31
55	January 29	Atlanta	W 111–102	Dick Van Arsdale (31)	Jim Fox (10)	Dick Van Arsdale (6)	Arizona Veterans Memorial Coliseum; 6,658	24–31
56	January 30	@ San Francisco	L 116–125	Connie Hawkins, Dick Van Arsdale (28)	Connie Hawkins (11)	Art Harris, Stan McKenzie (basketball) (5)	Oakland–Alameda County Coliseum Arena; 6,308	24–32
57	January 31	Milwaukee	L 106–107	Connie Hawkins (35)	Paul Silas (20)	Connie Hawkins (6)	Arizona Veterans Memorial Coliseum; 11,814	24–33

February: 9–7 (home: 4–2; road: 5–5)

Game	Date	Team	Score	High points	High rebounds	High assists	Location Attendance	Record
58	February 1	@ San Diego	W 105–103	Connie Hawkins (24)	Jim Fox, Connie Hawkins (12)	Gail Goodrich (7)	San Diego Sports Arena; 4,582	25–33
59	February 3	Philadelphia	W 131–123	Gail Goodrich, Connie Hawkins (28)	Connie Hawkins (13)	Connie Hawkins (9)	Arizona Veterans Memorial Coliseum; 6,543	26–33
60	February 6	San Francisco	W 122–117	Paul Silas (23)	Paul Silas (13)	Gail Goodrich (6)	Arizona Veterans Memorial Coliseum; 9,599	27–33
61	February 7	Los Angeles	W 121–117 (OT)	Connie Hawkins (37)	Paul Silas (13)	Art Harris, Connie Hawkins (6)	Arizona Veterans Memorial Coliseum; 10,459	28–33
62	February 10	@ Boston	W 122–117	Connie Hawkins (35)	Paul Silas (21)	Gail Goodrich (8)	Boston Garden; 4,761	29–33
63	February 11	@ Milwaukee	L 120–127	Connie Hawkins (32)	Paul Silas (11)	Connie Hawkins (6)	Milwaukee Arena; 10,746	29–34
64	February 12	@ Chicago	L 121–122	Connie Hawkins (37)	Connie Hawkins, Paul Silas (10)	Gail Goodrich (9)	Chicago Stadium; 11,190	29–35
65	February 13	@ Detroit	L 120–132	Dick Van Arsdale (27)	Connie Hawkins, Paul Silas (10)	Dick Van Arsdale (6)	Cobo Arena; 3,029	29–36
66	February 15	@ Philadelphia	L 125–159	Dick Van Arsdale (21)	Paul Silas (15)	Art Harris (4)	The Spectrum; 8,163	29–37
67	February 17	@ Seattle	W 129–118	Gail Goodrich (44)	Paul Silas (13)	Gail Goodrich (10)	Seattle Center Coliseum; 8,220	30–37
68	February 18	Boston	L 113–116	Dick Van Arsdale (26)	Connie Hawkins (14)	Gail Goodrich (9)	Arizona Veterans Memorial Coliseum; 6,818	30–38
69	February 20	San Diego	W 126–117	Gail Goodrich (31)	Paul Silas (15)	Gail Goodrich (12)	Arizona Veterans Memorial Coliseum; 6,136	31–38
70	February 22	Milwaukee	L 124–144	Connie Hawkins (25)	Connie Hawkins (14)	Gail Goodrich, Dick Van Arsdale (5)	Arizona Veterans Memorial Coliseum; 11,541	31–39
71	February 24	@ New York	L 105–121	Connie Hawkins (26)	Connie Hawkins (21)	Art Harris (8)	Madison Square Garden; 19,011	31–40
72	February 26	@ Detroit	W 131–123	Connie Hawkins (33)	Paul Silas (15)	Gail Goodrich (7)	Cobo Arena; 2,552	32–40
73	February 27	@ Boston	W 134–125	Dick Van Arsdale (37)	Connie Hawkins (10)	Connie Hawkins, Paul Silas (6)	Boston Garden; 8,933	33–40

March: 6–3 (home: 4–1; road: 2–2)

Game	Date	Team	Score	High points	High rebounds	High assists	Location Attendance	Record
74	March 1	@ Atlanta	W 109–98	Connie Hawkins (30)	Connie Hawkins (17)	Gail Goodrich (6)	Alexander Memorial Coliseum; 5,735	34–40
75	March 3	Boston	L 111–123	Dick Van Arsdale (25)	Paul Silas (15)	Gail Goodrich, Dick Van Arsdale (7)	Arizona Veterans Memorial Coliseum; 9,699	34–41
76	March 6	@ San Francisco	L 97–107	Connie Hawkins (27)	Connie Hawkins (15)	Paul Silas (4)	Oakland-Alameda Coliseum Arena; 4,316	34–42
77	March 8	Atlanta	W 130–119	Gail Goodrich (24)	Paul Silas (17)	Connie Hawkins (9)	Arizona Veterans Memorial Coliseum; 9,526	35–42
78	March 15	@ Atlanta	L 111–126	Connie Hawkins (30)	Paul Silas (19)	Gail Goodrich, Connie Hawkins (5)	Alexander Memorial Coliseum; 6,066	35–43
79	March 17	San Francisco	L 133–121	Gail Goodrich (36)	Paul Silas (17)	Connie Hawkins, Dick Van Arsdale (7)	Arizona Veterans Memorial Coliseum; 9,486	36–43
80	March 19	Boston	W 127–123	Gail Goodrich (32)	Connie Hawkins (14)	Connie Hawkins (9)	Arizona Veterans Memorial Coliseum; 9,570	37–43
81	March 20	San Diego	W 127–104	Connie Hawkins (29)	Paul Silas (12)	Connie Hawkins (8)	Arizona Veterans Memorial Coliseum; 9,026	38–43
82	March 22	@ San Diego	W 130–129	Connie Hawkins (44)	Connie Hawkins (20)	Gail Goodrich, Connie Hawkins (8)	San Diego Sports Arena; 4,558	39–43

1969–70 season schedule

=== Team-by-team results ===
Opponent	Home	Road	Total	All-time record	Suns leading scorer	Opp. leading scorer
Atlanta Hawks	3–0	1–2	4–2	4–8 (.333%)	Connie Hawkins (25.8)	Joe Caldwell (24.0)
Baltimore Bullets	2–1	1–2	3–3	3–9 (.250%)	Dick Van Arsdale (22.7)	Earl Monroe (20.2)
Boston Celtics	2–1	2–1	4–2	4–8 (.333%)	Dick Van Arsdale (25.5)	John Havlicek (24.8)
Chicago Bulls	2–2	0–3	2–5	4–9 (.308%)	Dick Van Arsdale (25.4)	Bob Love (27.1)
Cincinnati Royals	2–1	1–2	3–3	5–7 (.417%)	Connie Hawkins (26.5)	Oscar Robertson (24.7)
Detroit Pistons	2–1	1–2	3–3	5–7 (.417%)	Dick Van Arsdale (23.0)	Dave Bing (22.2)
Los Angeles Lakers	3–0	1–3	4–3	4–9 (.308%)	Connie Hawkins (22.4)	Elgin Baylor (29.0)
Milwaukee Bucks	0–3	0–3	0–6	2–12 (.143%)	Connie Hawkins (26.5)	Lew Alcindor (25.8)
New York Knicks	0–3	0–3	0–6	1–11 (.083%)	Connie Hawkins (28.0)	Willis Reed (27.3)
Philadelphia 76ers	1–2	1–2	2–4	3–9 (.250%)	Dick Van Arsdale (21.5)	Billy Cunningham (25.8)
San Diego Rockets	4–0	3–0	7–0	8–7 (.533%)	Connie Hawkins (25.7)	Elvin Hayes (28.7)
San Francisco Warriors	2–1	1–2	3–3	5–7 (.417%)	Connie Hawkins (24.5)	Jerry Lucas (19.5)
Seattle SuperSonics	2–1	2–2	4–3	7–6 (.538%)	Connie Hawkins (29.9)	Bob Rule (24.3)

== Playoffs ==
=== Game log ===
1970 playoff game log
Division semifinals: 3–4 (home: 2–1; road: 1–3)

Game	Date	Team	Score	High points	High rebounds	High assists	Location Attendance	Series
1	March 25	@ Los Angeles	L 112–128	Paul Silas (26)	Paul Silas (18)	Connie Hawkins (6)	The Forum; 15,046	0–1
2	March 29	@ Los Angeles	W 114–101	Connie Hawkins (34)	Connie Hawkins (20)	Hawkins, Van Arsdale (7)	The Forum; 17,501	1–1
3	April 2	Los Angeles	W 112–98	Gail Goodrich (29)	Paul Silas (16)	Connie Hawkins (9)	Arizona Veterans Memorial Coliseum; 12,324	2–1
4	April 4	Los Angeles	W 112–102	Gail Goodrich (34)	Paul Silas (16)	Gail Goodrich (11)	Arizona Veterans Memorial Coliseum; 12,356	3–1
5	April 5	@ Los Angeles	L 121–138	Connie Hawkins (28)	Connie Hawkins (19)	three players tied (5)	The Forum; 17,475	3–2
6	April 7	Los Angeles	L 93–104	Connie Hawkins (24)	Paul Silas (21)	Goodrich, Van Arsdale (4)	Arizona Veterans Memorial Coliseum; 12,386	3–3
7	April 9	@ Los Angeles	L 94–129	Connie Hawkins (25)	Connie Hawkins (15)	Hawkins, Silas (4)	The Forum; 17,519	3–4

1970 schedule

== Awards and honors ==
=== All-Star ===
- Connie Hawkins was voted as a starter for the Western Conference in the All-Star Game. Hawkins led all Western Conference forwards in voting. It was his first All-Star selection in the NBA.
- Dick Van Arsdale was selected as a reserve for the Western Conference in the All-Star Game. It was his second consecutive All-Star selection.

=== Season ===
- Connie Hawkins was named to the All-NBA First Team. Hawkins also finished fifth in MVP voting.

== Player statistics ==
Legend
GP	Games played	GS	Games started
MPG	Minutes per game	FG%	Field-goal percentage
FT%	Free-throw percentage	RPG	Rebounds per game
APG	Assists per game	PPG	Points per game

=== Season ===
Player	GP	MPG	FG%	FT%	RPG	APG	PPG
Jerry Chambers	79	14.4	.430	.728	2.8	0.7	8.3
Jim Fox	81	25.2	.524	.770	7.0	1.1	12.9
Gail Goodrich	81	39.9	.454	.808^	4.2	7.5	20.0
Lamar Green	58	12.1	.432	.586	4.8	0.3	4.2
Art Harris*	76	18.1	.395	.656	1.9	2.8	7.8
Connie Hawkins	81	40.9	.490	.779	10.4	4.8	24.6
Neil Johnson	28	4.9	.333	.667	1.7	0.4	1.7
Stan McKenzie (basketball)	58	9.1	.393	.795	1.6	0.9	3.8
Paul Silas	78	36.4	.464	.607	11.7	2.7	12.8
Dick Snyder*	6	24.5	.489	.875^	2.5	1.5	8.5
Dick Van Arsdale	77	38.5	.508	.798	3.4	4.4	21.3
Neal Walk	82	17.0	.470	.640	5.5	1.0	8.2

* – Stats with the Suns.
^ – Minimum 70 games played.

=== Playoffs ===
Player	GP	GS	MPG	FG%	FT%	RPG	APG	PPG
Jerry Chambers	7	0	10.4	.378	.625	2.4	1.0	4.7
Jim Fox	6	6	29.0	.362	.708	10.7	1.3	11.2
Gail Goodrich	7	7	37.9	.475	.857	4.6	5.4	20.3
Lamar Green	6	0	11.5	.286	.400	3.8	0.8	3.0
Art Harris	7	0	12.7	.357	.000	1.9	1.7	4.3
Connie Hawkins	7	7	46.9	.413	.818	13.9	5.9	25.4
Neil Johnson	2	0	3.5	.333	.	2.0	0.0	1.0
Stan McKenzie (basketball)	7	0	10.1	.276	.800	1.3	0.4	2.9
Paul Silas	7	7	40.9	.422	.656	15.9	4.3	16.1
Dick Van Arsdale	7	7	36.4	.430	.879	2.6	4.1	16.4
Neal Walk	5	1	12.6	.395	.750	7.0	0.4	8.0

== Transactions ==
=== Trades ===
May 8, 1969	To Atlanta Hawks (United States) Gary Gregor	To Phoenix Suns (United States) Paul Silas
September 13, 1969	To Philadelphia 76ers (United States) Bill Melchionni	To Phoenix Suns 1970 second-round draft pick ( (United States) Joe DePre)
September 20, 1969	To Atlanta Hawks (United States) Bumper Tormohlen	To Phoenix Suns 1970 third-round draft pick ( (United States) Vann Williford)
October 26, 1969	To Seattle SuperSonics (United States) Dick Snyder	To Phoenix Suns (United States) Art Harris

=== Free agents ===
==== Additions ====
Date	Player	Contract	Former Team
June 20, 1969	Connie Hawkins	Undisclosed	Minnesota Pipers (ABA)

==== Subtractions ====
Date	Player	Reason left	New team
September 11, 1969	Bob Warlick	Waived	Los Angeles Stars (ABA)
October 1, 1969	Dave Lattin	Waived	Pittsburgh Condors (ABA)
