= 1969–70 Los Angeles Lakers season =

NBA professional basketball team season

- Head coach: Joe Mullaney
- Arena: The Forum

Results
- Record: 46–36 (.561)
- Place: Division: 2nd (Western)
- Playoff finish: NBA Finals (lost to Knicks 3–4)
- Stats at Basketball Reference

The 1969–70 Los Angeles Lakers season was the Lakers' 22nd season in the NBA and tenth season in Los Angeles.

== Offseason ==
After the previous two seasons under coach Butch Van Breda Kolff, the Lakers replaced him with Joe Mullaney.

=== Draft picks ===
- 1st round, 12th pick – Willie McCarter, G, Drake University
- 1st round, 15th pick – Rick Roberson, C, University of Cincinnati
- 2nd round, 27th pick – Dick Garrett, G, Southern Illinois University

== Roster ==
1969–70 Los Angeles Lakers roster
Players

Pos.	No.	Player	Height	Weight	DOB	From
SF	22	Elgin Baylor	6 ft 5 in (1.96 m)	225 lb (102 kg)	1934-09-16	Seattle
C	13	Wilt Chamberlain	7 ft 1 in (2.16 m)	275 lb (125 kg)	1936-08-21	Kansas
C	31	Mel Counts	7 ft 0 in (2.13 m)	230 lb (104 kg)	1941-10-16	Oregon State
PG	21	Johnny Egan	5 ft 11 in (1.80 m)	180 lb (82 kg)	1939-01-31	Providence
SF	24	Keith Erickson	6 ft 5 in (1.96 m)	195 lb (88 kg)	1944-04-19	UCLA
SG	20	Dick Garrett	6 ft 3 in (1.91 m)	185 lb (84 kg)	1947-01-31	Southern Illinois
PF	52	Happy Hairston	6 ft 7 in (2.01 m)	225 lb (102 kg)	1942-05-31	NYU
PF	30	Bill Hewitt	6 ft 7 in (2.01 m)	210 lb (95 kg)	1944-08-08	USC
SF	33	Mike Lynn	6 ft 7 in (2.01 m)	215 lb (98 kg)	1945-11-25	UCLA
SG	15	Willie McCarter	6 ft 3 in (1.91 m)	175 lb (79 kg)	1946-07-26	Drake
C	35	Rick Roberson	6 ft 9 in (2.06 m)	231 lb (105 kg)	1947-07-07	Cincinnati
PF	14	John Tresvant	6 ft 7 in (2.01 m)	215 lb (98 kg)	1939-11-06	Seattle
PG	44	Jerry West	6 ft 3 in (1.91 m)	175 lb (79 kg)	1938-05-28	West Virginia

Coaches
Head coach
- Joe Mullaney

Legend
- (DP) Unsigned draft pick
- (FA) Free agent
- (S) Suspended
- Injured

Roster
Updated: January 23, 1970

== Regular season ==
After barely losing the NBA title the previous season, the veteran Lakers had high hopes coming into the 1969–70 season. However, 9 games into the season, Wilt Chamberlain suffered a severe knee injury and it was thought he would miss the next 10–12 months. Elgin Baylor also missed 28 games due to injury, and Jerry West missed 8. They traded Bill Hewitt for double-double machine Happy Hairston midway through the season. 1st round draft pick Willie McCarter also missed almost the entire season. But the Lakers received key contributions from rookies Rick Roberson and Dick Garrett, and managed to battle the Atlanta Hawks for 1st place in the Western Division for most of the season. Chamberlain returned for the final few games, and while the Lakers finished 2nd in the division to Atlanta by 2 games, they were at full strength for the playoffs.

=== Season standings ===
Western Division	W	L	PCT	GB
x-Atlanta Hawks	48	34	.585	–
x-Los Angeles Lakers	46	36	.561	2
x-Chicago Bulls	39	43	.476	9
x-Phoenix Suns	39	43	.476	9
Seattle SuperSonics	36	46	.439	12
San Francisco Warriors	30	52	.366	18
San Diego Rockets	27	55	.329	21

x – clinched playoff spot

=== Game log ===
1969–70 game log
#	Date	Opponent	Score	High points	Record
1	October 17	@ Philadelphia	126–131	Jerry West (39)	0–1
2	October 18	@ New York	96–99	Jerry West (42)	0–2
3	October 21	@ Baltimore	142–137 (OT)	Jerry West (39)	1–2
4	October 22	@ Cincinnati	116–109	Wilt Chamberlain (43)	2–2
5	October 24	Milwaukee	112–123	Elgin Baylor (26)	3–2
6	October 25	@ Seattle	130–106	Wilt Chamberlain (42)	4–2
7	October 26	Chicago	125–129	Wilt Chamberlain (37)	5–2
8	November 2	Cincinnati	124–116	Jerry West (27)	5–3
9	November 7	Phoenix	122–120	Wilt Chamberlain (33)	5–4
10	November 9	New York	112–102	Jerry West (28)	5–5
11	November 11	Detroit	110–102	Jerry West (24)	5–6
12	November 14	Phoenix	112–127	Elgin Baylor (31)	6–6
13	November 15	@ Phoenix	111–114	Elgin Baylor (30)	6–7
14	November 16	Philadelphia	125–138	Jerry West (45)	7–7
15	November 18	@ Detroit	125–114 (OT)	Elgin Baylor (32)	8–7
16	November 19	@ Cincinnati	116–103	Jerry West (32)	9–7
17	November 21	San Diego	98–100	Jerry West (37)	10–7
18	November 22	@ San Francisco	106–98	Jerry West (40)	11–7
19	November 23	Baltimore	129–97	Jerry West (38)	11–8
20	November 25	@ New York	96–103	Jerry West (41)	11–9
21	November 26	@ Milwaukee	81–100	Mel Counts (31)	11–10
22	November 28	San Francisco	114–108	Jerry West (43)	11–11
23	November 30	Chicago	116–114 (OT)	Jerry West (38)	11–12
24	December 4	@ Phoenix	109–119	Happy Hairston (25)	11–13
25	December 5	Detroit	109–128	Jerry West (26)	12–13
26	December 6	@ San Diego	128–115	Jerry West (30)	13–13
27	December 7	Atlanta	104–103	Elgin Baylor (36)	13–14
28	December 9	@ Philadelphia	99–123	Willie McCarter (21)	13–15
29	December 10	@ Boston	99–111	Elgin Baylor (29)	13–16
30	December 12	@ Atlanta	107–121	Elgin Baylor (26)	13–17
31	December 14	Seattle	127–131	Elgin Baylor (37)	14–17
32	December 19	Cincinnati	117–109	Jerry West (30)	14–18
33	December 21	Philadelphia	117–133	Jerry West (33)	15–18
34	December 23	@ San Diego	109–115	Jerry West (30)	15–19
35	December 26	New York	106–114	Jerry West (40)	16–19
36	December 28	Boston	99–109	Jerry West (34)	17–19
37	December 30	@ San Francisco	100–105	Jerry West (34)	17–20
38	January 2	San Francisco	95–125	Jerry West (32)	18–20
39	January 3	@ Seattle	126–109	Jerry West (45)	19–20
40	January 4	Phoenix	112–120	Jerry West (35)	20–20
41	January 6	N Chicago	100–105	Jerry West (37)	20–21
42	January 9	@ Atlanta	127–112	Jerry West (26)	21–21
43	January 10	@ Chicago	112–116 (OT)	Jerry West (36)	21–22
44	January 14	@ Milwaukee	113–115	Jerry West (34)	21–23
45	January 16	@ Boston	108–103	Jerry West (23)	22–23
46	January 18	@ Detroit	100–106	Jerry West (30)	22–24
47	January 22	N San Francisco	108–122	Jerry West (40)	23–24
48	January 23	Seattle	100–128	Happy Hairston (34)	24–24
49	January 24	@ Seattle	122–121 (OT)	Jerry West (39)	25–24
50	January 25	Phoenix	106–118	Jerry West (38)	26–24
51	January 27	San Diego	109–124	Jerry West (41)	27–24
52	January 28	@ San Diego	113–108	Jerry West (36)	28–24
53	January 30	Atlanta	87–102	Keith Erickson (23)	29–24
54	February 1	@ Philadelphia	113–112	Elgin Baylor (33)	30–24
55	February 3	N Cincinnati	124–114	Jerry West (38)	31–24
56	February 4	@ Detroit	109–125	Happy Hairston (31)	31–25
57	February 6	Milwaukee	118–105	Elgin Baylor (27)	31–26
58	February 7	@ Phoenix	117–121 (OT)	Elgin Baylor (41)	31–27
59	February 8	San Diego	113–125	Jerry West (34)	32–27
60	February 10	Baltimore	111–106	Jerry West (29)	32–28
61	February 11	@ San Francisco	125–115	Baylor, West (43)	33–28
62	February 12	Atlanta	114–136	Jerry West (42)	34–28
63	February 14	@ Chicago	113–116	Elgin Baylor (34)	34–29
64	February 15	@ Milwaukee	98–96	Jerry West (28)	35–29
65	February 17	@ New York	93–114	Elgin Baylor (18)	35–30
66	February 18	@ Baltimore	103–117	Jerry West (25)	35–31
67	February 20	Milwaukee	114–119	Jerry West (37)	36–31
68	February 21	@ San Diego	106–121	Happy Hairston (30)	36–32
69	February 22	Boston	96–108	Elgin Baylor (39)	37–32
70	February 24	Atlanta	118–106	Happy Hairston (24)	37–33
71	February 27	Chicago	101–111	Elgin Baylor (42)	38–33
72	March 1	@ Boston	120–114	Jerry West (33)	39–33
73	March 3	@ Atlanta	93–101	Elgin Baylor (21)	39–34
74	March 4	@ Baltimore	94–91	Jerry West (32)	40–34
75	March 6	Baltimore	105–100	Jerry West (35)	40–35
76	March 8	Cincinnati	116–144	Jerry West (31)	41–35
77	March 10	San Francisco	104–106	Jerry West (42)	42–35
78	March 13	Philadelphia	117–128	Jerry West (43)	43–35
79	March 15	New York	101–106	Jerry West (38)	44–35
80	March 18	Boston	137–122	Jerry West (36)	44–36
81	March 20	Detroit	111–117	Jerry West (34)	45–36
82	March 22	Seattle	118–121	Wilt Chamberlain (21)	46–36

== Playoffs ==
1970 playoff game log
Division Semi-finals: 4–3 (home: 3–1; road: 1–2)

Game	Date	Team	Score	High points	High rebounds	High assists	Location Attendance	Series
1	March 25	Phoenix	W 128–112	Elgin Baylor (32)	Wilt Chamberlain (19)	Elgin Baylor (10)	The Forum; 15,046	1–0
2	March 29	Phoenix	L 101–114	Jerry West (33)	Wilt Chamberlain (25)	Jerry West (11)	The Forum; 17,501	1–1
3	April 2	@ Phoenix	L 98–112	Jerry West (31)	Wilt Chamberlain (12)	Chamberlain, West (7)	Arizona Veterans Memorial Coliseum; 12,324	1–2
4	April 4	@ Phoenix	L 102–112	Wilt Chamberlain (29)	Wilt Chamberlain (19)	Keith Erickson (6)	Arizona Veterans Memorial Coliseum; 12,356	1–3
5	April 5	Phoenix	W 138–121	Chamberlain, West (36)	Mel Counts (17)	Jerry West (18)	The Forum; 17,475	2–3
6	April 7	@ Phoenix	W 104–93	Jerry West (35)	Wilt Chamberlain (26)	Wilt Chamberlain (11)	Arizona Veterans Memorial Coliseum; 12,386	3–3
7	April 9	Phoenix	W 129–94	Wilt Chamberlain (30)	Wilt Chamberlain (27)	Jerry West (15)	The Forum; 17,519	4–3

Division finals: 4–0 (home: 2–0; road: 2–0)

Game	Date	Team	Score	High points	High rebounds	High assists	Location Attendance	Series
1	April 12	@ Atlanta	W 119–115	Jerry West (38)	Wilt Chamberlain (17)	Wilt Chamberlain (8)	Alexander Memorial Coliseum; 7,197	1–0
2	April 14	@ Atlanta	W 105–94	Chamberlain, West (24)	Wilt Chamberlain (24)	Keith Erickson (7)	Alexander Memorial Coliseum; 7,197	2–0
3	April 17	Atlanta	W 115–114 (OT)	Jerry West (35)	Wilt Chamberlain (26)	Jerry West (13)	The Forum; 17,183	3–0
4	April 19	Atlanta	W 133–114	Jerry West (39)	Wilt Chamberlain (21)	Jerry West (12)	The Forum; 17,410	4–0

NBA Finals: 3–4 (home: 2–1; road: 1–3)

Game	Date	Team	Score	High points	High rebounds	High assists	Location Attendance	Series
1	April 24	@ New York	L 112–124	Jerry West (33)	Wilt Chamberlain (24)	Wilt Chamberlain (5)	Madison Square Garden; 19,500	0–1
2	April 27	@ New York	W 105–103	Jerry West (34)	Wilt Chamberlain (24)	Garrett, Erickson (6)	Madison Square Garden; 19,500	1–1
3	April 29	New York	L 108–111 (OT)	Jerry West (34)	Wilt Chamberlain (26)	Elgin Baylor (11)	The Forum; 17,500	1–2
4	May 1	New York	W 121–115 (OT)	Jerry West (37)	Wilt Chamberlain (25)	Jerry West (18)	The Forum; 17,509	2–2
5	May 4	@ New York	L 100–107	Wilt Chamberlain (22)	Wilt Chamberlain (19)	Keith Erickson (6)	Madison Square Garden; 19,500	2–3
6	May 6	New York	W 135–113	Wilt Chamberlain (45)	Wilt Chamberlain (27)	Jerry West (13)	The Forum; 17,509	3–3
7	May 8	@ New York	L 99–113	Jerry West (28)	Wilt Chamberlain (24)	Keith Erickson (6)	Madison Square Garden; 19,500	3–4

1970 schedule

== Awards and records ==
- Jerry West, All-NBA First Team
- Jerry West, NBA All-Defensive First Team
- Jerry West, NBA All-Star Game
- Elgin Baylor, NBA All-Star Game
- Dick Garrett, NBA All-Rookie Team 1st Team
