= 1969–70 San Diego Rockets season =

- Head coach: Jack McMahon (fired); Alex Hannum
- General manager: Pete Newell
- Owner: Bob Breitbard
- Arena: San Diego Sports Arena

Results
- Record: 27–55 (.329)
- Place: Division: 7th (Western)
- Playoff finish: Did not qualify
- Stats at Basketball Reference

Local media
- Television: KCST-TV
- Radio: KOGO

The 1969–70 San Diego Rockets season was the Rockets' 3rd season in the NBA.

== Roster ==
1969–70 San Diego Rockets roster
Players

Pos.	No.	Player	Height	Weight	DOB	From
PG	12	Rick Adelman	6 ft 1 in (1.85 m)	175 lb (79 kg)	1946-06-16	Loyola Marymount
SG	33	Jim Barnett	6 ft 4 in (1.93 m)	170 lb (77 kg)	1944-07-07	Oregon
PF	34	John Block	6 ft 9 in (2.06 m)	207 lb (94 kg)	1944-04-16	USC
C	11	Elvin Hayes	6 ft 9 in (2.06 m)	235 lb (107 kg)	1945-11-17	Houston
PF	7	Toby Kimball	6 ft 6 in (1.98 m)	220 lb (100 kg)	1942-09-07	Connecticut
SF	44	Don Kojis	6 ft 5 in (1.96 m)	215 lb (98 kg)	1939-01-15	Marquette
PG	22	Stu Lantz	6 ft 3 in (1.91 m)	175 lb (79 kg)	1946-07-13	Nebraska
SF	42	Pat Riley	6 ft 4 in (1.93 m)	205 lb (93 kg)	1945-03-20	Kentucky
SF	32	Bingo Smith	6 ft 5 in (1.96 m)	195 lb (88 kg)	1946-02-26	Tulsa
SF	31	John Q. Trapp	6 ft 7 in (2.01 m)	210 lb (95 kg)	1945-10-02	UNLV
PG	14	Art Williams	6 ft 1 in (1.85 m)	180 lb (82 kg)	1939-09-29	Cal Poly Pomona
SG	18	Bernie Williams	6 ft 3 in (1.91 m)	175 lb (79 kg)	1945-12-30	La Salle

Coaches
Head coach
- Jack McMahon (fired)
- Alex Hannum

Legend
- (DP) Unsigned draft pick
- (FA) Free agent
- (S) Suspended
- Injured

Roster
Updated: December 10, 1969

== Regular season ==
=== Season standings ===
Western Division	W	L	PCT	GB
x-Atlanta Hawks	48	34	.585	–
x-Los Angeles Lakers	46	36	.561	2
x-Chicago Bulls	39	43	.476	9
x-Phoenix Suns	39	43	.476	9
Seattle SuperSonics	36	46	.439	12
San Francisco Warriors	30	52	.366	18
San Diego Rockets	27	55	.329	21

=== Game log ===
1969–70 Game log
#	Date	Opponent	Score	High points	Record
1	October 16	@ Phoenix	114–116	Don Kojis (27)	0–1
2	October 18	@ San Francisco	125–124 (OT)	Elvin Hayes (29)	1–1
3	October 22	Milwaukee	115–102	Don Kojis (26)	1–2
4	October 25	Phoenix	115–107	Elvin Hayes (28)	1–3
5	October 29	@ Atlanta	113–117	Elvin Hayes (34)	1–4
6	October 30	@ New York	110–123	Elvin Hayes (25)	1–5
7	October 31	@ Boston	113–118	Don Kojis (26)	1–6
8	November 1	@ Detroit	113–130	Elvin Hayes (31)	1–7
9	November 5	@ Cincinnati	120–133	Jim Barnett (22)	1–8
10	November 7	New York	129–111	Elvin Hayes (25)	1–9
11	November 10	N San Francisco	99–100	Elvin Hayes (23)	2–9
12	November 12	Detroit	119–132	Elvin Hayes (34)	3–9
13	November 14	Seattle	112–148	Jim Barnett (24)	4–9
14	November 15	Atlanta	118–133	Stu Lantz (30)	5–9
15	November 18	@ Baltimore	138–142 (OT)	Barnett, Hayes, Kojis (26)	5–10
16	November 19	@ Philadelphia	125–116	John Block (33)	6–10
17	November 21	@ Los Angeles	98–100	Barnett, Hayes (25)	6–11
18	November 22	Boston	116–125	Elvin Hayes (41)	7–11
19	November 24	Seattle	105–112	John Block (32)	8–11
20	November 26	San Francisco	126–125 (OT)	Hayes, Kojis (25)	8–12
21	November 28	@ Chicago	119–126	Elvin Hayes (33)	8–13
22	November 30	@ Milwaukee	99–111	Jim Barnett (18)	8–14
23	December 3	Chicago	131–146	Don Kojis (40)	9–14
24	December 5	@ San Francisco	107–112	Don Kojis (23)	9–15
25	December 6	Los Angeles	128–115	Elvin Hayes (40)	9–16
26	December 8	Detroit	111–102	Elvin Hayes (29)	9–17
27	December 10	Atlanta	107–126	Elvin Hayes (35)	10–17
28	December 12	@ Boston	104–107	Don Kojis (26)	10–18
29	December 13	@ Baltimore	105–117	Don Kojis (21)	10–19
30	December 14	@ Milwaukee	105–118	Don Kojis (31)	10–20
31	December 16	@ Chicago	110–101	Elvin Hayes (31)	11–20
32	December 17	@ Detroit	114–107	Jim Barnett (21)	12–20
33	December 19	San Francisco	111–119	John Block (25)	13–20
34	December 20	Cincinnati	111–126	Elvin Hayes (30)	14–20
35	December 21	@ Seattle	96–112	Elvin Hayes (27)	14–21
36	December 23	Los Angeles	109–115	Elvin Hayes (32)	15–21
37	December 27	Boston	111–110	Elvin Hayes (22)	15–22
38	December 29	@ Atlanta	118–122	Elvin Hayes (33)	15–23
39	December 30	@ Cincinnati	120–125	Elvin Hayes (31)	15–24
40	December 31	@ Milwaukee	126–143	Elvin Hayes (26)	15–25
41	January 2	@ Phoenix	120–121	Elvin Hayes (28)	15–26
42	January 4	Chicago	121–140	Elvin Hayes (34)	16–26
43	January 8	San Francisco	103–120	Bernie Williams (34)	17–26
44	January 10	New York	115–123	Elvin Hayes (31)	18–26
45	January 13	Baltimore	144–126	Elvin Hayes (37)	18–27
46	January 17	Baltimore	131–115	Elvin Hayes (34)	18–28
47	January 22	N Milwaukee	106–115	Elvin Hayes (29)	18–29
48	January 24	@ New York	114–127	Elvin Hayes (25)	18–30
49	January 25	@ Philadelphia	131–159	Elvin Hayes (27)	18–31
50	January 27	@ Los Angeles	109–124	Elvin Hayes (25)	18–32
51	January 28	Los Angeles	113–108	Jim Barnett (25)	18–33
52	January 30	Seattle	117–119 (OT)	Elvin Hayes (49)	19–33
53	February 1	Phoenix	105–103	Elvin Hayes (32)	19–34
54	February 4	Milwaukee	141–123	Elvin Hayes (20)	19–35
55	February 6	Philadelphia	129–124	Jim Barnett (35)	19–36
56	February 8	@ Los Angeles	113–125	Hayes, Lantz (15)	19–37
57	February 11	Atlanta	155–131	Elvin Hayes (32)	19–38
58	February 14	San Francisco	123–141	Elvin Hayes (41)	20–38
59	February 15	Cincinnati	123–150	Stu Lantz (36)	21–38
60	February 16	N Baltimore	109–140	Elvin Hayes (27)	21–39
61	February 18	N Seattle	119–122	Jim Barnett (42)	22–39
62	February 20	@ Phoenix	117–126	Elvin Hayes (40)	22–40
63	February 21	Los Angeles	106–121	Elvin Hayes (23)	23–40
64	February 23	N Chicago	125–127	Barnett, Lantz (32)	23–41
65	February 24	@ Baltimore	118–128	John Block (24)	23–42
66	February 25	@ Boston	124–147	Elvin Hayes (46)	23–43
67	February 27	@ Philadelphia	111–125	Elvin Hayes (38)	23–44
68	March 1	Chicago	122–135	Elvin Hayes (38)	24–44
69	March 3	@ Seattle	114–126	Elvin Hayes (31)	24–45
70	March 4	Cincinnati	127–125	Bingo Smith (21)	24–46
71	March 6	@ New York	103–107	Elvin Hayes (33)	24–47
72	March 7	@ Detroit	126–134	Elvin Hayes (33)	24–48
73	March 9	N Philadelphia	112–131	Elvin Hayes (32)	24–49
74	March 10	@ Chicago	106–111	John Block (33)	24–50
75	March 11	@ Atlanta	121–122	Elvin Hayes (37)	24–51
76	March 12	@ Cincinnati	151–165	Elvin Hayes (40)	24–52
77	March 14	New York	119–103	Elvin Hayes (32)	24–53
78	March 15	Philadelphia	128–137	Jim Barnett (32)	25–53
79	March 17	Boston	117–125	Elvin Hayes (30)	26–53
80	March 19	Detroit	118–132	Bingo Smith (22)	27–53
81	March 20	@ Phoenix	104–127	Elvin Hayes (25)	27–54
82	March 22	Phoenix	130–129	Block, Hayes (23)	27–55
