= Art Harris =

American basketball player (1947–2007)

Personal information
- Born: January 13, 1947
- Died: October 13, 2007 (aged 60) San Francisco, California, U.S.
- Listed height: 6 ft 4 in (1.93 m)
- Listed weight: 185 lb (84 kg)

Career information
- High school: Jordan (Los Angeles, California)
- College: Stanford (1965–1968)
- NBA draft: 1968: 2nd round, 16th overall pick
- Drafted by: Seattle SuperSonics
- Playing career: 1968–1975
- Position: Guard
- Number: 12, 23

Career history
- 1968–1969: Seattle SuperSonics
- 1969–1972: Phoenix Suns
- 1975: Belgium Lions

Career highlights
- NBA All-Rookie First Team (1969); First-team All-AAWU (1966); Second-team All-AAWU (1968)

Career NBA statistics
- Points: 2,171 (9.1 ppg)
- Rebounds: 575 (2.4 rpg)
- Assists: 639 (2.7 apg)
- Stats at NBA.com
- Stats at Basketball Reference

Arthur Carlos Harris Jr. (January 13, 1947 – October 13, 2007) was an American professional basketball player.

== Career ==
After graduating from Jordan High School, in Watts, Los Angeles, Harris joined Stanford University The 6'4" guard received first-team All-AAWU honors as a sophomore and averaged 20.7 ppg as a senior in 1967–68. He averaged 17.2 points per game in his collegiate career and was later named to the Stanford Athletic Hall of Fame.

Harris was selected by the Seattle SuperSonics in the second round of the 1968 NBA draft and by the Oakland Oaks in the 1969 ABA Draft. He played four seasons (1968–1972) in the National Basketball Association (NBA), starting with the Seattle SuperSonics. He was named to the NBA All-Rookie Team in 1968 after averaging 12.4 points per game. Harris appeared in only 5 games for the Sonics in the 1969–70 season before being traded to the Phoenix Suns for Dick Snyder. Harris remained in Phoenix for the next three seasons before being waived in January 1972. During the 1968–69 season, Harris led the NBA in disqualifications with 14.

In 1975 he played for the Belgium Lions in the European Professional Basketball League.

== Death ==
Harris died October 13, 2007, in San Francisco, California.

== Career statistics ==
Legend
GP	Games played	GS	Games started	MPG	Minutes per game
FG%	Field goal percentage	3P%	3-point field goal percentage	FT%	Free throw percentage
RPG	Rebounds per game	APG	Assists per game	SPG	Steals per game
BPG	Blocks per game	PPG	Points per game	**Bold**	Career high

=== NBA ===
==== Regular season ====
Year	Team	GP	MPG	FG%	FT%	RPG	APG	PPG
1968–69	Seattle	**80**	32.0	.395	.641	**3.8**	3.2	**12.4**
1969–70	Seattle	5	**35.6**	.384	.444	**3.8**	**4.0**	12.0
1969–70	Phoenix	76	18.1	.395	**.656**	1.9	2.8	7.8
1970–71	Phoenix	56	17.0	**.411**	.611	1.8	2.4	8.3
1971–72	Phoenix	21	6.9	.329	.429	.6	.9	2.6
Career		238	21.9	.396	.626	2.4	2.7	9.1

==== Playoffs ====
Year	Team	GP	MPG	FG%	FT%	RPG	APG	PPG
1970	Phoenix	7	12.7	.357	.000	1.9	1.7	4.3
