= 1969–70 Atlanta Hawks season =

NBA professional basketball team season

- Division champions
- Head coach: Richie Guerin
- Arena: Alexander Memorial Coliseum

Results
- Record: 48–34 (.585)
- Place: Division: 1st (Western)
- Playoff finish: West Finals (Eliminated 0–4)
- Stats at Basketball Reference

Local media
- Television: WQXI-TV
- Radio: WQXI

The 1969–70 Atlanta Hawks season was the Hawks' 21st season in the NBA and second season in the city of Atlanta.

== Draft picks ==
Round	Pick	Player	Position	Nationality	College
1	10	Butch Beard	G	United States	Louisville
2	25	Wally Anderzunas	F/C	United States	Creighton

== Roster ==
1969–70 Atlanta Hawks roster
Players

Pos.	No.	Player	Height	Weight	DOB	From
G	14	Butch Beard (DP)	6 ft 3 in (1.91 m)	185 lb (84 kg)		Louisville
C	8	Walt Bellamy	6 ft 11 in (2.11 m)	225 lb (102 kg)		Indiana
F/C	32	Bill Bridges	6 ft 6 in (1.98 m)	228 lb (103 kg)		Kansas
G/F	27	Joe Caldwell	6 ft 5 in (1.96 m)	195 lb (88 kg)		Arizona State
F/C	24	Jim Davis	6 ft 9 in (2.06 m)	225 lb (102 kg)		Colorado
F/C	40	Gary Gregor	6 ft 7 in (2.01 m)	225 lb (102 kg)		South Carolina
G	19	Richie Guerin	6 ft 4 in (1.93 m)	195 lb (88 kg)		Iona
G	42	Walt Hazzard	6 ft 2 in (1.88 m)	185 lb (84 kg)		UCLA
G/F	23	Lou Hudson	6 ft 5 in (1.96 m)	210 lb (95 kg)		Minnesota
C	29	Dave Newmark	7 ft 0 in (2.13 m)	240 lb (109 kg)		Columbia
F	12	Grady O'Malley	6 ft 5 in (1.96 m)	205 lb (93 kg)		Manhattan
G	10	Don Ohl	6 ft 3 in (1.91 m)	190 lb (86 kg)		Illinois
F/C	34	Bumper Tormohlen	6 ft 8 in (2.03 m)	230 lb (104 kg)		Tennessee

Coaches
Head coach
- Richie Guerin (Iona)

Legend
- (DP) Unsigned draft pick
- (FA) Free agent
- (S) Suspended
- Injured

== Regular season ==
=== Season standings ===
Western Division	W	L	PCT	GB
x-Atlanta Hawks	48	34	.585	–
x-Los Angeles Lakers	46	36	.561	2
x-Chicago Bulls	39	43	.476	9
x-Phoenix Suns	39	43	.476	9
Seattle SuperSonics	36	46	.439	12
San Francisco Warriors	30	52	.366	18
San Diego Rockets	27	55	.329	21

=== Game log ===
1969–70 game log
Total: 48–34
October: 4–3

Game	Date	Team	Score	High points	Location Attendance	Record
1	October 15	Seattle	W 124–119	Jim Davis (31)	Alexander Memorial Coliseum	1–0
2	October 18	Phoenix	W 121–116	Joe Caldwell (26)	Alexander Memorial Coliseum	2–0
3	October 22	San Francisco	L 93–94	Lou Hudson (25)	Alexander Memorial Coliseum	2–1
4	October 24	Boston	W 122–110	Lou Hudson (28)	Boston Garden	3–1
5	October 25	Detroit	L 104–125	Lou Hudson (31)	Alexander Memorial Coliseum	3–2
6	October 28	New York	L 104–128	Don Ohl (19)	Madison Square Garden	3–3
7	October 29	San Diego	W 117–113	Lou Hudson (29)	Alexander Memorial Coliseum	4–3

November: 12–5

Game	Date	Team	Score	High points	Location Attendance	Record
8	November 1	Baltimore	W 140–137	Lou Hudson (41)	Baltimore Civic Center	5–3
9	November 2	Seattle	W 125–113	Walt Hazzard (23)	Alexander Memorial Coliseum	6–3
10	November 5	Boston	W 128–121	Lou Hudson (37)	Alexander Memorial Coliseum	7–3
11	November 6	Chicago	W 142–137	Lou Hudson (30)	Chicago Stadium	8–3
12	November 8	San Francisco	W 106–93	Bill Bridges (24)	Alexander Memorial Coliseum	9–3
13	November 10	Chicago	W 133–132	Lou Hudson (52)	Auburn, AL	10–3
14	November 11	Philadelphia	W 124–107	Lou Hudson (30)	Alexander Memorial Coliseum	11–3
15	November 14	San Francisco	W 120–109	Lou Hudson (38)	Oakland–Alameda County Coliseum Arena	12–3
16	November 15	San Diego	L 118–133	Butch Beard (31)	San Diego Sports Arena	12–4
17	November 16	Phoenix	L 118–139	Jim Davis (26)	Albuquerque, New Mexico	12–5
18	November 19	Seattle	W 137–116	Joe Caldwell (34)	Seattle Center Coliseum	13–5
19	November 21	Detroit	W 118–106	Bill Bridges (27)	Cobo Arena	14–5
20	November 22	Philadelphia	L 116–132	Lou Hudson (25)	Alexander Memorial Coliseum	14–6
21	November 25	Milwaukee	L 115–130	Jim Davis (30)	St. Louis, Missouri	14–7
22	November 26	New York	L 108–138	Joe Caldwell (17)	Alexander Memorial Coliseum	14–8
23	November 28	Boston	W 130–105	Joe Caldwell (34)	Boston Garden	15–8
24	November 29	Cincinnati	W 128–111	Lou Hudson (32)	Boston Garden	16–8

December: 10–6

Game	Date	Team	Score	High points	Location Attendance	Record
25	December 4	Seattle	W 119–111	Walt Hazzard (32)	Alexander Memorial Coliseum	17–8
26	December 5	Cincinnati	L 127–156	Lou Hudson (31)	Cincinnati Gardens	17–9
27	December 7	L.A. Lakers	W 104–103	Walt Hazzard (27)	The Forum	18–9
28	December 7	San Francisco	W 117–115	Lou Hudson (31)	Salt Lake City, UT	19–9
29	December 10	San Diego	L 107–126	Jim Davis (24)	San Diego Sports Arena	19–10
30	December 12	L.A. Lakers	W 121–107	Lou Hudson (25)	Alexander Memorial Coliseum	20–10
31	December 13	Milwaukee	L 100–121	Bill Bridges (24)	Alexander Memorial Coliseum	20–11
32	December 16	New York	W 125–124	Joe Caldwell (28)	Madison Square Garden	21–11
33	December 17	Baltimore	L 133–138	Lou Hudson (44)	Alexander Memorial Coliseum	21–12
34	December 18	Chicago	L 112–114	Lou Hudson (25)	Kansas City, Kansas	21–13
35	December 20	Boston	W 122–106	Lou Hudson (29)	Alexander Memorial Coliseum	22–13
36	December 21	Chicago	W 118–111	Lou Hudson (31)	Alexander Memorial Coliseum	23–13
37	December 26	Cincinnati	L 110–130	Bill Bridges (24)	Cleveland, OH	23–14
38	December 27	Philadelphia	W 112–107	Joe Caldwell (31)	Alexander Memorial Coliseum	24–14
39	December 29	San Diego	W 122–118	Lou Hudson (29)	Alexander Memorial Coliseum	25–14
40	December 31	Baltimore	W 122–111	Lou Hudson (29)	Alexander Memorial Coliseum	26–14

January: 6–11

Game	Date	Team	Score	High points	Location Attendance	Record
41	January 2	Philadelphia	L 117–121	Walt Hazzard (27)	The Spectrum	26–15
42	January 3	Cincinnati	L 102–104	Lou Hudson (25)	Alexander Memorial Coliseum	26–16
43	January 4	Milwaukee	W 126–125	Joe Caldwell (26)	Milwaukee Arena	27–16
44	January 6	Seattle	W 101–97	Bill Bridges (26)	Alexander Memorial Coliseum	28–16
45	January 7	Boston	W 112–106	Bill Bridges (30)	Boston Garden	29–16
46	January 9	L.A. Lakers	L 112–127	Lou Hudson (30)	Alexander Memorial Coliseum	29–17
47	January 10	Baltimore	L 109–130	Lou Hudson (22)	Baltimore Civic Center	29–18
48	January 12	Detroit	W 113–100	Bill Bridges (23)	Memphis, Tennessee	29–19
49	January 13	Philadelphia	L 105–136	Butch Beard (27)	The Spectrum	29–20
50	January 14	San Francisco	L 101–103	Joe Caldwell (33)	Alexander Memorial Coliseum	29–21
51	January 16	Cincinnati	W 117–100	Lou Hudson (33)	Columbia, South Carolina	30–21
52	January 18	Chicago	W 125–107	Walt Hazzard (40)	Alexander Memorial Coliseum	31–21
53	January 25	Milwaukee	L 116–131	Joe Caldwell (22)	Alexander Memorial Coliseum	31–22
54	January 26	San Francisco	W 131–104	Lou Hudson (30)	Oakland–Alameda County Coliseum Arena	32–22
55	January 28	Seattle	L 119–120	Bill Bridges (24)	Seattle Center Coliseum	32–23
56	January 29	Phoenix	L 102–111	Joe Caldwell (29)	Arizona Veterans Memorial Coliseum	32–24
57	January 30	L.A. Lakers	L 87–102	Gary Gregor (22)	The Forum	32–25

February: 8–7

Game	Date	Team	Score	High points	Location Attendance	Record
58	February 1	Baltimore	L 124–133	Lou Hudson (45)	Alexander Memorial Coliseum	32–26
59	February 2	Detroit	W 125–121	Lou Hudson (42)	Greenville, South Carolina	33–26
60	February 4	New York	W 111–96	Lou Hudson (36)	Alexander Memorial Coliseum	34–26
61	February 6	Chicago	W 104–93	Lou Hudson (28)	Alexander Memorial Coliseum	35–26
62	February 8	Chicago	L 107–117	Joe Caldwell (24)	Chicago Stadium	35–27
63	February 10	San Francisco	L 104–113	Joe Caldwell (20)	Oakland–Alameda County Coliseum Arena	35–28
64	February 11	San Diego	W 155–131	Walt Hazzard (38)	San Diego Sports Arena	36–28
65	February 12	L.A. Lakers	L 114–136	Walt Bellamy (31)	The Forum	36–29
66	February 15	Boston	W 146–125	Lou Hudson (36)	Alexander Memorial Coliseum	37–29
67	February 18	Cincinnati	W 139–125	Joe Caldwell (41)	Memphis, Tennessee	38–29
68	February 21	New York	W 122–106	Walt Hazzard (27)	Madison Square Garden	39–29
69	February 22	Detroit	L 114–116	Joe Caldwell (34)	Alexander Memorial Coliseum	39–30
70	February 24	L.A. Lakers	W 118–106	Joe Caldwell (38)	The Forum	40–30
71	February 25	Seattle	L 112–120	Lou Hudson (32)	Seattle Center Coliseum	40–31
72	February 27	Baltimore	L 107–114	Joe Caldwell (22)	Baltimore Civic Center	40–32

March: 8–2

Game	Date	Team	Score	High points	Location Attendance	Record
73	March 1	Phoenix	L 98–109	Lou Hudson (30)	Alexander Memorial Coliseum	40–33
74	March 3	L.A. Lakers	W 101–93	Lou Hudson (31)	Alexander Memorial Coliseum	41–33
75	March 5	Milwaukee	W 126–117	Joe Caldwell (29)	Milwaukee Arena	42–33
76	March 8	Phoenix	L 119–130	Walt Bellamy (31)	Arizona Veterans Memorial Coliseum	42–34
77	March 10	Milwaukee	W 140–127	Lou Hudson (36)	Alexander Memorial Coliseum	43–34
78	March 11	San Diego	W 122–121	Lou Hudson (48)	Alexander Memorial Coliseum	44–34
79	March 15	Phoenix	W 126–111	Walt Hazzard (36)	Alexander Memorial Coliseum	45–34
80	March 17	Philadelphia	W 128–125	Joe Caldwell (45)	The Spectrum	46–34
81	March 20	New York	W 110–102	Lou Hudson (38)	Alexander Memorial Coliseum	47–34
82	March 22	Detroit	W 130–126	Joe Caldwell (25)	Cobo Arena	48–34

1969–70 schedule

- The 11/6/1969 game at Chicago Stadium was suspended, and was completed on 2/8/1970.

== Playoffs ==
1970 playoff game log
Division Semifinals: 4–1 (home: 3–0; road: 1–1)

Game	Date	Team	Score	High points	High rebounds	High assists	Location Attendance	Series
1	March 25	Chicago	W 129–111	Joe Caldwell (39)	Bill Bridges (15)	Walt Hazzard (10)	Alexander Memorial Coliseum; 6,427	1–0
2	March 28	Chicago	W 124–104	Joe Caldwell (23)	Walt Bellamy (14)	Walt Hazzard (13)	Alexander Memorial Coliseum; 7,195	2–0
3	March 31	@ Chicago	W 106–101	Lou Hudson (30)	Walt Bellamy (17)	Walt Hazzard (8)	Chicago Stadium; 8,898	3–0
4	April 3	@ Chicago	L 120–131	Joe Caldwell (38)	Bill Bridges (25)	Walt Hazzard (9)	Chicago Stadium; 7,584	3–1
5	April 5	Chicago	W 113–107	Joe Caldwell (24)	Walt Bellamy (23)	Bill Bridges (4)	Alexander Memorial Coliseum; 4,966	4–1

Division Finals: 0–4 (home: 0–2; road: 0–2)

Game	Date	Team	Score	High points	High rebounds	High assists	Location Attendance	Series
1	April 12	Los Angeles	L 115–119	Walt Hazzard (29)	Walt Bellamy (21)	Lou Hudson (8)	Alexander Memorial Coliseum; 7,197	0–1
2	April 14	Los Angeles	L 94–105	Walt Bellamy (20)	Bill Bridges (19)	Joe Caldwell (7)	Alexander Memorial Coliseum; 7,197	0–2
3	April 17	@ Los Angeles	L 114–115 (OT)	Hudson, Beard (22)	Bill Bridges (19)	Lou Hudson (6)	The Forum; 17,183	0–3
4	April 19	@ Los Angeles	L 114–133	Richie Guerin (31)	Bill Bridges (18)	Caldwell, Hudson (5)	The Forum; 17,410	0–4

1970 schedule

== Awards and records ==
=== Awards ===
- Lou Hudson, All-NBA Second Team
- Bill Bridges, NBA All-Defensive Second Team
- Joe Caldwell, NBA All-Defensive Second Team
