= Shaler Halimon =

American basketball player (1945–2021)

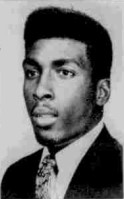

Personal information
- Born: March 30, 1945 Tampa, Florida, U.S.
- Died: April 19, 2021 (aged 76) Vancouver, Washington, U.S.
- Listed height: 6 ft 5 in (1.96 m)
- Listed weight: 199 lb (90 kg)

Career information
- High school: Romulus (Romulus, Michigan)
- College: Imperial Valley (1964–1966); Utah State (1966–1968)
- NBA draft: 1968: 1st round, 14th overall pick
- Drafted by: Philadelphia 76ers
- Playing career: 1968–1973
- Position: Shooting guard / small forward
- Number: 26, 19, 11, 15

Career history
- 1968–1969: Philadelphia 76ers
- 1969–1970: Chicago Bulls
- 1970–1971: Portland Trail Blazers
- 1971: Atlanta Hawks
- 1971–1973: Dallas Chaparrals
- Stats at NBA.com
- Stats at Basketball Reference

Shaler Halimon Jr. (March 30, 1945 – April 19, 2021) was an American basketball player. He played five seasons in the National Basketball Association (NBA) and American Basketball Association (ABA).

Halimon, a 6'5" swingman from Tampa, Florida, attended Imperial Valley Community College before playing college basketball for the Utah State Aggies. Halimon averaged 25.1 points and 10.2 rebounds per game in his two seasons with Utah State.

At the conclusion of his college career, Halimon was drafted by the Philadelphia 76ers in the first round of the 1968 NBA draft (14th overall pick). He played in the NBA for the 76ers, Chicago Bulls, Portland Trail Blazers and Atlanta Hawks and for the Dallas Chaparrals of the ABA. He averaged 6.7 points and 3.4 rebounds per game in the NBA and 6.2 points and 3.1 rebounds in the ABA.

In 1973, Halimon retired from the game. He worked first as a social worker in San Antonio, Texas, then as a city bus driver in Portland, Oregon. He became a driver for TriMet, the transit agency for the Portland metropolitan area, in 1978. The agency named him its "Bus operator of the year" in 2010". He retired from TriMet in 2012.

Halimon died on April 19, 2021.

== Career statistics ==
Legend
GP	Games played	GS	Games started	MPG	Minutes per game
FG%	Field goal percentage	3P%	3-point field goal percentage	FT%	Free throw percentage
RPG	Rebounds per game	APG	Assists per game	SPG	Steals per game
BPG	Blocks per game	PPG	Points per game	**Bold**	Career high

=== NBA/ABA ===
==== Regular season ====
Year	Team	GP	GS	MPG	FG%	3P%	FT%	RPG	APG	PPG
1968–69	Philadelphia	50		7.0	**.449**		.313	1.7	.4	3.7
1969–70	Chicago	38		13.6	.393		.671	1.8	1.8	6.3
1970–71	Chicago	2	0	11.5	.125		.000	1.0	2.0	1.0
1970–71	Portland	**79**		**20.6**	.387		.665	**5.3**	**2.7**	**8.9**
1971–72	Atlanta	1		4.0	–		–	.0	.0	.0
1971–72	Dallas (ABA)	55		14.0	.418	–	**.721**	2.8	1.3	5.6
1972–73	Dallas (ABA)	29		12.2	.396	**.143**	.622	1.9	1.7	4.9
Career (NBA)		170		14.8	.397		.622	3.4	1.8	6.7
Career (ABA)		84		13.4	.411	.111	.691	2.5	1.4	5.4
Career (overall)		254		14.4	.400	.111	.644	3.1	1.7	6.2

==== Playoffs ====
Year	Team	GP	MPG	FG%	3P%	FT%	RPG	APG	PPG
1969	Philadelphia	1	2.0	.500		–	.0	.0	2.0
1970	Chicago	**5**	**21.2**	.344		**.667**	**4.0**	**3.6**	**8.8**
1972	Dallas (ABA)	4	13.8	**.529**	–	.571	3.3	1.8	5.5
Career (NBA)		6	18.0	.349		.667	3.3	3.0	7.7
Career (overall)		10	16.3	.388	–	.600	3.3	2.5	6.8
