= 1969–70 Chicago Bulls season =

NBA professional basketball team season

- Head coach: Dick Motta
- General manager: Pat Williams
- Owner: Dick Klein
- Arena: Chicago Stadium

Results
- Record: 39–43 (.476)
- Place: Division: 3rd (Western)
- Playoff finish: Division semifinals (lost to Hawks 1–4)
- Stats at Basketball Reference

Local media
- Television: WGN-TV (Jack Brickhouse, Vince Lloyd)
- Radio: WGN (Vince Lloyd, Roy Leonard)

The 1969–70 Chicago Bulls season was the Bulls' fourth season in the NBA.

== Roster ==
1969–70 Chicago Bulls roster
Players

Pos.	No.	Player	Height	Weight	DOB	From
C	18	Tom Boerwinkle	7 ft 0 in (2.13 m)	265 lb (120 kg)	1945-08-23	Tennessee
G	19	Shaler Halimon	6 ft 5 in (1.96 m)	199 lb (90 kg)	1945-03-30	Utah State
G	11	Clem Haskins	6 ft 3 in (1.91 m)	195 lb (88 kg)	1943-07-11	Western Kentucky
F	6	Bob Kauffman	6 ft 8 in (2.03 m)	240 lb (109 kg)	1946-07-13	Guilford
F	10	Bob Love	6 ft 8 in (2.03 m)	215 lb (98 kg)	1942-12-08	Southern
F	16	Ed Manning	6 ft 7 in (2.01 m)	210 lb (95 kg)	1944-01-02	Jackson State
G	15	Loy Petersen	6 ft 5 in (1.96 m)	205 lb (93 kg)	1945-07-26	Oregon State
G/F	4	Jerry Sloan	6 ft 5 in (1.96 m)	195 lb (88 kg)	1942-03-28	Evansville
F	25	Chet Walker	6 ft 6 in (1.98 m)	212 lb (96 kg)	1940-02-22	Bradley
G	8	Bob Weiss	6 ft 2 in (1.88 m)	180 lb (82 kg)	1942-05-07	Penn State
C	20	Walt Wesley	6 ft 11 in (2.11 m)	220 lb (100 kg)	1945-01-25	Kansas

Coaches
Head coach
- Dick Motta

Legend
- (DP) Unsigned draft pick
- (FA) Free agent
- (S) Suspended
- Injured

Roster
Updated: January 5, 1970

== Regular season ==
=== Season standings ===
Western Division	W	L	PCT	GB
x-Atlanta Hawks	48	34	.585	–
x-Los Angeles Lakers	46	36	.561	2
x-Chicago Bulls	39	43	.476	9
x-Phoenix Suns	39	43	.476	9
Seattle SuperSonics	36	46	.439	12
San Francisco Warriors	30	52	.366	18
San Diego Rockets	27	55	.329	21

=== Game log ===
1969–70 game log
#	Date	Opponent	Score	High points	Record
1	October 15	@ Baltimore	93–98	Jerry Sloan (21)	0–1
2	October 17	New York	116–87	Chet Walker (27)	0–2
3	October 18	Seattle	126–131 (OT)	Chet Walker (31)	1–2
4	October 24	@ Phoenix	116–115 (OT)	Chet Walker (39)	2–2
5	October 26	@ Los Angeles	125–129	Jerry Sloan (25)	2–3
6	October 28	@ Seattle	116–114	Chet Walker (25)	3–3
7	October 29	@ San Francisco	101–87	Chet Walker (28)	4–3
8	October 31	N Baltimore	118–109	Clem Haskins (38)	5–3
9	November 4	N Philadelphia	113–109	Chet Walker (28)	5–4
10	November 6	Atlanta	142–137 (OT)	Chet Walker (29)	5–5
11	November 8	Boston	87–103	Bob Love (27)	6–5
12	November 10	N Atlanta	132–133	Bob Love (32)	6–6
13	November 11	Seattle	100–106	Chet Walker (34)	7–6
14	November 13	@ New York	99–114	Chet Walker (25)	7–7
15	November 14	@ Milwaukee	100–122	Boerwinkle, Wesley (14)	7–8
16	November 15	San Francisco	105–124	Chet Walker (36)	8–8
17	November 18	Philadelphia	119–127	Chet Walker (32)	9–8
18	November 19	@ Boston	106–122	Clem Haskins (27)	9–9
19	November 21	@ Cincinnati	119–133	Clem Haskins (25)	9–10
20	November 22	Milwaukee	106–125	Clem Haskins (29)	10–10
21	November 25	N Detroit	104–103	Bob Love (29)	10–11
22	November 26	@ Detroit	129–109	Haskins, Sloan (28)	11–11
23	November 28	San Diego	119–126	Bob Love (33)	12–11
24	November 30	@ Los Angeles	116–114 (OT)	Clem Haskins (36)	13–11
25	December 2	N Phoenix	121–110	Bob Love (34)	13–12
26	December 3	@ San Diego	131–146	Clem Haskins (27)	13–13
27	December 5	@ Phoenix	113–114	Clem Haskins (27)	13–14
28	December 6	Boston	114–116 (OT)	Jerry Sloan (27)	14–14
29	December 8	N Baltimore	122–125	Jerry Sloan (23)	14–15
30	December 9	Phoenix	102–109	Bob Love (32)	15–15
31	December 11	N San Francisco	104–110	Chet Walker (31)	16–15
32	December 12	Baltimore	123–108	Clem Haskins (27)	16–16
33	December 14	@ Philadelphia	121–126	Chet Walker (24)	16–17
34	December 16	San Diego	110–101	Clem Haskins (26)	16–18
35	December 18	N Atlanta	114–112	Love, Sloan, Wesley (22)	17–18
36	December 19	New York	108–99	Al Tucker (24)	17–19
37	December 21	@ Atlanta	111–118	Chet Walker (25)	17–20
38	December 23	@ Boston	112–117	Bob Weiss (30)	17–21
39	December 30	@ New York	96–116	Chet Walker (19)	17–22
40	December 31	@ Philadelphia	109–129	Chet Walker (29)	17–23
41	January 1	@ Seattle	114–111	Chet Walker (28)	18–23
42	January 3	@ San Francisco	102–116	Bob Love (22)	18–24
43	January 4	@ San Diego	121–140	Bob Love (28)	18–25
44	January 6	N Los Angeles	100–105	Chet Walker (24)	19–25
45	January 8	Phoenix	123–152	Bob Love (34)	20–25
46	January 10	Los Angeles	112–116 (OT)	Chet Walker (27)	21–25
47	January 12	Philadelphia	113–117	Clem Haskins (28)	22–25
48	January 15	Cincinnati	120–130	Clem Haskins (34)	23–25
49	January 16	N Seattle	119–103	Chet Walker (22)	23–26
50	January 17	@ Milwaukee	132–130 (OT)	Clem Haskins (23)	24–26
51	January 18	@ Atlanta	107–125	Tom Boerwinkle (29)	24–27
52	January 23	New York	120–117	Bob Love (31)	24–28
53	January 24	@ Detroit	122–128	Clem Haskins (22)	24–29
54	January 25	Detroit	111–120	Clem Haskins (31)	25–29
55	January 26	N Cincinnati	116–115	Clem Haskins (27)	25–30
56	January 28	@ Baltimore	115–123	Clem Haskins (32)	25–31
57	January 30	Milwaukee	121–105	Bob Love (22)	25–32
58	January 31	@ New York	104–123	Chet Walker (21)	25–33
59	February 1	Cincinnati	108–115	Chet Walker (30)	26–33
60	February 3	N Boston	85–93	Chet Walker (23)	26–34
61	February 5	San Francisco	127–105	Bob Love (26)	26–35
62	February 6	@ Atlanta	93–104	Bob Love (22)	26–36
63	February 8	Atlanta	107–117	Bob Love (34)	27–36
64	February 12	Phoenix	121–122	Chet Walker (30)	28–36
65	February 14	Los Angeles	113–116	Bob Love (27)	29–36
66	February 15	@ Detroit	119–126	Clem Haskins (31)	29–37
67	February 20	Philadelphia	119–126	Chet Walker (32)	30–37
68	February 21	@ Cincinnati	119–127	Chet Walker (31)	30–38
69	February 23	N San Diego	125–127	Bob Love (28)	31–38
70	February 25	@ San Francisco	112–104	Bob Love (32)	32–38
71	February 27	@ Los Angeles	101–111	Chet Walker (26)	32–39
72	February 28	@ Seattle	104–140	Chet Walker (21)	32–40
73	March 1	@ San Diego	122–135	Tom Boerwinkle (26)	32–41
74	March 3	@ Phoenix	123–111	Clem Haskins (33)	33–41
75	March 10	San Diego	106–111	Clem Haskins (23)	34–41
76	March 13	@ Chicago	113–134	Jerry Sloan (29)	35–41
77	March 14	Detroit	96–111	Chet Walker (26)	36–41
78	March 15	N Milwaukee	107–130	Bob Love (47)	37–41
79	March 16	N Cincinnati	140–142 (OT)	Chet Walker (44)	38–41
80	March 17	Seattle	109–102	Clem Haskins (33)	38–42
81	March 20	Baltimore	138–131	Chet Walker (25)	38–43
82	March 22	Milwaukee	115–129	Bob Love (31)	39–43

== Playoffs ==
1970 playoff game log
Division semifinals: 1–4 (home: 1–1; road: 0–3)

Game	Date	Team	Score	High points	High rebounds	High assists	Location Attendance	Series
1	March 25	@ Atlanta	L 111–129	Chet Walker (17)	Tom Boerwinkle (11)	Haskins, Weiss (6)	Alexander Memorial Coliseum; 6,427	0–1
2	March 28	@ Atlanta	L 104–124	Tom Boerwinkle (23)	Tom Boerwinkle (12)	Boerwinkle, Weiss (4)	Alexander Memorial Coliseum; 7,195	0–2
3	March 31	Atlanta	L 101–106	Shaler Halimon (22)	Tom Boerwinkle (18)	Shaler Halimon (6)	Chicago Stadium; 8,898	0–3
4	April 3	Atlanta	W 131–120	Chet Walker (39)	Sloan, Boerwinkle (12)	Clem Haskins (13)	Chicago Stadium; 7,584	1–3
5	April 5	@ Atlanta	L 107–113	Clem Haskins (22)	Tom Boerwinkle (19)	Clem Haskins (6)	Alexander Memorial Coliseum; 4,966	1–4

1970 schedule

== Awards and records ==
- Jerry Sloan, NBA All-Defensive Second Team
- Chet Walker, NBA All-Star Game
