= 1974 NBA expansion draft =

Player selection draft

General information
- Sport: Basketball
- Date: May 20, 1974

Overview
- League: NBA
- Expansion team: New Orleans Jazz

The 1974 NBA expansion draft was the sixth expansion draft of the National Basketball Association (NBA). The draft was held on May 20, 1974, so that the newly founded New Orleans Jazz could acquire players for the upcoming 1974–75 season. New Orleans had been awarded the expansion team on March 7, 1974. The Jazz moved to Salt Lake City in 1979 and are currently known as the Utah Jazz. In an NBA expansion draft, new NBA teams are allowed to acquire players from the previously established teams in the league. Not all players on a given team are available during an expansion draft, since each team can protect a certain number of players from being selected. In this draft, each of the seventeen other NBA teams had protected seven players from their roster and the Jazz selected seventeen unprotected players, one from each team.

The Jazz were formed and owned by a group headed by Fred Rosenfeld and Sam Battistone. Former college basketball coach Scotty Robertson was hired as the franchise's first head coach and 11-time All-Star Elgin Baylor was named as one of the assistant coach. The Jazz's selections included five-time All-Star Walt Bellamy, three-time All-Star Bob Kauffman and one-time All-Star John Block. However, none of them had long careers with the Jazz; Bellamy, who was 35 years old, was waived after one game and both Kauffman and Block were traded. Prior to the draft, the Jazz made a trade with the Atlanta Hawks which brought two-time All-Star Pete Maravich to the Jazz. In exchange for Maravich, the Jazz sent the first guard and forward chosen in the expansion draft, which turned out to be Bob Kauffman and Dean Meminger, along with future draft picks to the Hawks. Ten players from the expansion draft joined the Jazz for their inaugural season, but only three played more than one season for the team.

== Key ==
Pos.	G	F	C
Position	Guard	Forward	Center

^	Denotes player who has been inducted to the Naismith Memorial Basketball Hall of Fame
^{+}	Denotes player who has been selected for at least one All-Star Game

== Selections ==
Player	Pos.	Nationality	Previous team	Years of NBA experience^{[a]}	Career with the franchise	Ref.
Dennis Awtrey	C	United States	Chicago Bulls	4	—^{[b]}	
Jim Barnett	G/F	United States	Golden State Warriors	8	1974–1975	
Walt Bellamy^	C	United States	Atlanta Hawks	13	1974	
John Block^{+}	F/C	United States	Kansas City–Omaha Kings	8	1974	
Barry Clemens	F	United States	Cleveland Cavaliers	9	—^{[b]}	
E. C. Coleman	F	United States	Houston Rockets	1	1974–1977	
Lamar Green	F/C	United States	Phoenix Suns	5	1974	
Nate Hawthorne	G	United States	Los Angeles Lakers	1	—^{[b]}	
Ollie Johnson	F	United States	Portland Trail Blazers	2	1974–1975	
Bob Kauffman^{+}	F/C	United States	Buffalo Braves	6	—^{[b]}	
Toby Kimball	F/C	United States	Philadelphia 76ers	8	1974	
Steve Kuberski	F/C	United States	Boston Celtics	5	—^{[b]}	
Stu Lantz	G	United States	Detroit Pistons	6	1974	
Dean Meminger	G	United States	New York Knicks	3	—^{[b]}	
Louie Nelson	G	United States	Washington Bullets	1	1974–1976	
Curtis Perry	F	United States	Milwaukee Bucks	4	—^{[b]}	
Isaac Stallworth	G/F	United States	Seattle SuperSonics	2	1974–1977	

== Notes ==
- ^{a} Number of years played in the NBA prior to the draft
- ^{b} Never played a game for the franchise
