= 1974–75 Boston Celtics season =

NBA basketball team season

- Division champions
- Head coach: Tom Heinsohn
- General manager: Red Auerbach
- Arena: Boston Garden

Results
- Record: 60–22 (.732)
- Place: Division: 1st (Atlantic); Conference: 1st (Eastern)
- Playoff finish: Conference finals (lost to Bullets 2–4)
- Stats at Basketball Reference

Local media
- Television: WBZ-TV
- Radio: WBZ Radio

The 1974–75 Boston Celtics season was the 29th season of the Boston Celtics in the National Basketball Association (NBA). The Celtics entered the season hoping to repeat as NBA champions, but were unable to defend their title, falling in the Eastern Conference finals to the Washington Bullets in six games. They did however, win their division for the fourth consecutive season, and their conference final appearance was the fourth straight to that point. Their 60–22 record topped the league as well.

The Boston Celtics were one of a handful of teams to play home games in four arenas; playing out of more than one arena was common in the league's first 30 or so years. Their main venue was Boston Garden, but three home games were played at the Hartford Civic Center, three at the Providence Civic Center and one at the Springfield Civic Center.

== Draft picks ==
This table only displays picks through the second round.

Round	Pick	Player	Position	Nationality	College
1	17	Glenn McDonald	SF	United States	Long Beach State
2	35	Kevin Stacom	SG	United States	Providence

== Roster ==
1974–75 Boston Celtics roster
Players

Pos.	No.	Player	Height	Weight	DOB	From
C	34	Jim Ard	6 ft 8 in (2.03 m)	215 lb (98 kg)		Cincinnati
G	12	Don Chaney	6 ft 5 in (1.96 m)	210 lb (95 kg)		Houston
C	18	Dave Cowens	6 ft 9 in (2.06 m)	230 lb (104 kg)		Florida State
C	29	Henry Finkel	7 ft 0 in (2.13 m)	240 lb (109 kg)		Dayton
F	20	Phil Hankinson	6 ft 8 in (2.03 m)	195 lb (88 kg)		Penn
G/F	17	John Havlicek	6 ft 5 in (1.96 m)	203 lb (92 kg)		Ohio State
F	30	Glenn McDonald	6 ft 6 in (1.98 m)	190 lb (86 kg)		Long Beach State
F	19	Don Nelson	6 ft 6 in (1.98 m)	210 lb (95 kg)		Iowa
F	35	Paul Silas	6 ft 7 in (2.01 m)	220 lb (100 kg)		Creighton
G	27	Kevin Stacom	6 ft 3 in (1.91 m)	185 lb (84 kg)		Providence
G	44	Paul Westphal	6 ft 4 in (1.93 m)	195 lb (88 kg)		USC
G	10	Jo Jo White	6 ft 3 in (1.91 m)	190 lb (86 kg)		Kansas

Coaches
Head coach
- Tom Heinsohn
Assistant(s)
- John Killilea

Legend
- (DP) Unsigned draft pick
- (FA) Free agent
- (S) Suspended
- Injured

== Regular season ==
=== Season standings ===
Atlantic Division	W	L	PCT	GB	Home	Road	Div
y-Boston Celtics	60	22	.732	–	28–13	32–9	17–9
x-Buffalo Braves	49	33	.598	11	30–11	19–22	15–11
x-New York Knicks	40	42	.488	20	23–18	17–24	9–17
Philadelphia 76ers	34	48	.415	26	20–21	14–27	11–15

#	Eastern Conference				
#	Team	W	L	PCT	GB
1	z-Boston Celtics	60	22	.732	–
2	y-Washington Bullets	60	22	.732	–
3	x-Buffalo Braves	49	33	.598	11
4	x-Houston Rockets	41	41	.500	19
5	x-New York Knicks	40	42	.488	20
6	Cleveland Cavaliers	40	42	.488	20
7	Philadelphia 76ers	34	48	.415	26
8	Atlanta Hawks	31	51	.378	29
9	New Orleans Jazz	23	59	.280	37

=== Season schedule ===
1974–75 game log
Total: 60–22 (home: 28–13; road: 32–9)
October: 3–4 (home: 1–3; road: 2–1)

Game	Date	Team	Score	High points	High rebounds	High assists	Location Attendance	Record
1	October 18	Buffalo	126–119	Don Nelson (28)	Paul Silas (19)	Jo Jo White (8)	Boston Garden; 15,320	0–1
2	October 19	@ Buffalo	113–95	John Havlicek (25)	Paul Silas (22)	Havlicek, Westphal (6)	Buffalo Memorial Auditorium; 15,288	1–1
3	October 23	Cleveland	108–107	Jo Jo White (28)	Paul Silas (16)	Jo Jo White (7)	Boston Garden; 7,158	1–2
4	October 25	Atlanta	109–116	John Havlicek (34)	Paul Silas (24)	John Havlicek (7)	Boston Garden; 12,742	2–2
5	October 26	@ New York	86–97	John Havlicek (25)	Paul Silas (11)	Jo Jo White (4)	Madison Square Garden; 19,694	2–3
6	October 29	@ Cleveland	107–92	Jo Jo White (24)	Paul Silas (18)	Jo Jo White (11)	Richfield Coliseum; 13,184	3–3
7	October 30	Chicago	105–104	Paul Westphal (17)	Paul Silas (16)	Paul Westphal (6)	Boston Garden; 7,964	3–4

November: 8–6 (home: 4–5; road: 4–1)

Game	Date	Team	Score	High points	High rebounds	High assists	Location Attendance	Record
8	November 1	Philadelphia	98–114	John Havlicek (29)	Jim Ard (16)	Jo Jo White (7)	Boston Garden; 8,269	4–4
9	November 2	@ Atlanta	126–125	Paul Westphal (27)	Paul Silas (18)	Paul Westphal (7)	Omni Coliseum; 6,897	5–4
10	November 6	Portland	110–128	John Havlicek (40)	Paul Silas (10)	Jo Jo White (10)	Boston Garden; 12,134	6–4
11	November 8	Detroit	105–104	John Havlicek (36)	Paul Silas (13)	John Havlicek (5)	Boston Garden; 9,542	6–5
12	November 10	@ Kansas City–Omaha	102–99	John Havlicek (26)	Jim Ard (18)	Jo Jo White (7)	Kemper Arena; 8,118	7–5
13	November 12	@ Milwaukee	91–83	Paul Silas (22)	Paul Silas (13)	John Havlicek (7)	MECCA Arena; 9,919	8–5
14	November 14	Buffalo	112–100	Jo Jo White (25)	Paul Silas (14)	Jo Jo White (5)	Providence Civic Center; 7,315	8–6
15	November 15	Kansas City–Omaha	110–109	John Havlicek (30)	Paul Silas (20)	Paul Silas (6)	Boston Garden; 13,192	8–7
16	November 16	@ Washington	124–109	Don Nelson (35)	Paul Silas (17)	John Havlicek (9)	Capital Centre; 16,204	9–7
17	November 20	Golden State	120–115	John Havlicek (23)	Jim Ard (14)	John Havlicek (8)	Providence Civic Center; 3,509	9–8
18	November 22	Phoenix	94–95	Jo Jo White (23)	Jim Ard (12)	John Havlicek (9)	Boston Garden; 13,756	10–8
19	November 23	@ Philadelphia	96–98	Don Nelson (35)	Paul Silas (14)	Don Chaney (6)	The Spectrum; 7,008	10–9
20	November 27	Seattle	99–104	Jo Jo White (31)	Dave Cowens (15)	Don Chaney (9)	Boston Garden; 10,543	11–9
21	November 29	New York	96–86	Dave Cowens (23)	Paul Silas (17)	Cowens, White (5)	Boston Garden; 15,320	11–10

December: 10–3 (home: 2–2; road: 8–1)

Game	Date	Team	Score	High points	High rebounds	High assists	Location Attendance	Record
22	December 4	Los Angeles	90–101	Dave Cowens (32)	Dave Cowens (15)	John Havlicek (8)	Boston Garden; 8,881	12–10
23	December 6	@ Houston	120–114 (OT)	Dave Cowens (38)	Dave Cowens (11)	Don Chaney (6)	Hofheinz Pavilion; 5,268	13–10
24	December 8	@ New Orleans	111–101	Jo Jo White (21)	Dave Cowens (16)	Cowens, Silas (4)	Municipal Auditorium; 7,042	14–10
25	December 10	@ Chicago	107–89	Don Chaney (28)	Paul Silas (15)	Jo Jo White (8)	Chicago Stadium; 11,036	15–10
26	December 13	Washington	108–89	John Havlicek (16)	Dave Cowens (15)	Havlicek, Silas (4)	Boston Garden; 15,320	15–11
27	December 14	@ Atlanta	92–90 (OT)	Jo Jo White (25)	Dave Cowens (19)	Jo Jo White (8)	Omni Coliseum; 7,253	16–11
28	December 17	Philadelphia	113–109	Jo Jo White (22)	Dave Cowens (18)	Jo Jo White (11)	Providence Civic Center; 4,134	16–12
29	December 18	@ Philadelphia	131–99	John Havlicek (27)	Paul Silas (13)	Dave Cowens (8)	The Spectrum; 7,145	17–12
30	December 20	New Orleans	106–110	Dave Cowens (27)	Paul Silas (15)	Cowens, White (4)	Springfield Civic Center; 6,883	18–12
31	December 21	@ New York	109–91	John Havlicek (26)	Paul Silas (21)	Paul Silas (6)	Madison Square Garden; 19,694	19–12
32	December 25	@ Phoenix	96–110	Jo Jo White (33)	Dave Cowens (13)	John Havlicek (9)	Arizona Veterans Memorial Coliseum; 8,276	19–13
33	December 28	@ Golden State	115–105	Dave Cowens (32)	Dave Cowens (18)	Jo Jo White (11)	Oakland-Alameda County Coliseum Arena; 12,787	20–13
34	December 29	@ Seattle	121–101	Dave Cowens (26)	Dave Cowens (19)	Jo Jo White (7)	Seattle Center Coliseum; 14,082	21–13

January: 13–1 (home: 8–0; road: 5–1)

Game	Date	Team	Score	High points	High rebounds	High assists	Location Attendance	Record
35	January 1	@ Portland	108–94	John Havlicek (31)	Dave Cowens (14)	Jo Jo White (11)	Memorial Coliseum; 11,362	22–13
36	January 3	@ Los Angeles	127–106	Jo Jo White (28)	Dave Cowens (13)	Jo Jo White (8)	The Forum; 16,955	23–13
37	January 8	Atlanta	96–104	Paul Westphal (23)	Paul Silas (21)	Cowens, Havlicek (5)	Boston Garden; 12,160	24–13
38	January 9	@ Buffalo	108–100	Dave Cowens (28)	Paul Silas (12)	Dave Cowens (8)	Maple Leaf Gardens; 13,544	25–13
39	January 10	Los Angeles	97–103	Jo Jo White (23)	Cowens, Silas (13)	Jo Jo White (10)	Boston Garden; 13,385	26–13
40	January 12	@ Buffalo	101–114	Dave Cowens (22)	Paul Silas (13)	Havlicek, Westphal (7)	Buffalo Memorial Auditorium; 15,377	26–14
41	January 17	Detroit	90–96	Dave Cowens (23)	Don Nelson (10)	Jo Jo White (6)	Boston Garden; 15,320	27–14
42	January 18	Houston	101–123	Dave Cowens (24)	Dave Cowens (17)	Westphal, White (6)	Hartford Civic Center; 11,283	28–14
43	January 19	Philadelphia	100–102	Jo Jo White (27)	Paul Silas (14)	Jo Jo White (7)	Boston Garden; 15,320	29–14
44	January 21	@ Houston	113–102	John Havlicek (22)	Dave Cowens (17)	John Havlicek (12)	Hofheinz Pavilion; 4,576	30–14
45	January 22	@ New Orleans	110–102	Dave Cowens (22)	Dave Cowens (16)	Dave Cowens (4)	Loyola Field House; 5,723	31–14
46	January 24	Kansas City-Omaha	87–96	Dave Cowens (26)	Paul Silas (15)	Cowens, White (4)	Boston Garden; 10,952	32–14
47	January 26	Buffalo	93–107	Dave Cowens (24)	Dave Cowens (13)	Jo Jo White (7)	Boston Garden; 15,320	33–14
48	January 31	Cleveland	99–121	Jo Jo White (24)	Dave Cowens (14)	John Havlicek (10)	Boston Garden; 15,320	34–14

February: 9–5 (home: 3–2; road: 6–3)

Game	Date	Team	Score	High points	High rebounds	High assists	Location Attendance	Record
49	February 2	Milwaukee	102–120	Dave Cowens (24)	Dave Cowens (2)	John Havlicek (6)	Boston Garden; 15,320	35–14
50	February 3	@ Detroit	114–100	Jo Jo White (29)	Dave Cowens (20)	Dave Cowens (8)	Cobo Arena; 10,962	36–14
51	February 5	@ Milwaukee	92–90	Dave Cowens (23)	Dave Cowens (15)	Dave Cowens (10)	MECCA Arena; 10,938	37–14
52	February 7	Philadelphia	98–95	Cowens, Nelson (20)	Paul Silas (15)	Cowens, Havlicek (8)	Boston Garden; 15,320	37–15
53	February 8	@ New York	128–102	Dave Cowens (31)	Dave Cowens (12)	Jo Jo White (7)	Madison Square Garden; 19,694	38–15
54	February 9	New York	88–105	Dave Cowens (25)	Dave Cowens (20)	Cowens, White (6)	Boston Garden; 15,320	39–15
55	February 12	@ Kansas City-Omaha	102–103	Don Nelson (21)	Dave Cowens (13)	Dave Cowens (6)	Omaha Civic Auditorium; 9,728	39–16
56	February 14	@ Phoenix	112–106	Dave Cowens (29)	Paul Silas (14)	Jo Jo White (9)	Arizona Veterans Memorial Coliseum; 9,338	40–16
57	February 15	@ Portland	102–100	John Havlicek (25)	Dave Cowens (12)	John Havlicek (10)	Memorial Coliseum; 11,798	41–16
58	February 19	@ Seattle	95–121	Jo Jo White (18)	Dave Cowens (16)	Paul Westphal (6)	Seattle Center Coliseum; 13,680	41–17
59	February 22	@ Golden State	108–114	John Havlicek (27)	Dave Cowens (17)	John Havlicek (8)	Oakland-Alameda County Coliseum Arena; 12,961	41–18
60	February 23	@ Los Angeles	119–115	Dave Cowens (30)	Dave Cowens (13)	Jo Jo White (11)	The Forum; 13,723	42–18
61	February 26	New York	103–121	Dave Cowens (24)	Dave Cowens (19)	John Havlicek (7)	Boston Garden; 13,169	43–18
62	February 28	Milwaukee	106–107	Dave Cowens (33)	Dave Cowens (19)	Jo Jo White (9)	Boston Garden; 15,320	44–18

March: 13–4 (home: 7–2; road: 6–2)

Game	Date	Team	Score	High points	High rebounds	High assists	Location Attendance	Record
63	March 2	Seattle	104–97	Dave Cowens (24)	Dave Cowens (22)	Cowens, White (7)	Hartford Civic Center; 11,283	44–19
64	March 4	@ New York	126–111	John Havlicek (27)	Dave Cowens (15)	Jo Jo White (6)	Madison Square Garden; 19,694	45–19
65	March 5	@ Philadelphia	116–107	Cowens, Havlicek (28)	Dave Cowens (20)	John Havlicek (8)	The Spectrum; 9,087	46–19
66	March 9	Golden State	102–101	Jo Jo White (25)	Dave Cowens (12)	John Havlicek (7)	Boston Garden; 15,320	46–20
67	March 11	@ Chicago	121–115 (OT)	Havlicek, White (34)	John Havlicek (15)	Cowens, Havlicek (7)	Chicago Stadium; 19,121	47–20
68	March 12	Phoenix	82–88	Jo Jo White (20)	Dave Cowens (18)	Jo Jo White (7)	Hartford Civic Center; 11,283	48–20
69	March 14	Portland	98–103	Dave Cowens (24)	Paul Silas (18)	Dave Cowens (7)	Boston Garden; 13,087	49–20
70	March 16	Houston	94–99	Dave Cowens (24)	Dave Cowens (21)	John Havlicek (9)	Boston Garden; 15,320	50–20
71	March 18	@ Detroit	116–90	Don Nelson (27)	Don Nelson (15)	John Havlicek (5)	Cobo Arena; 9,379	51–20
72	March 19	@ Washington	80–97	Paul Westphal (17)	Paul Silas (15)	Paul Westphal (8)	Capital Centre; 19,035	51–21
73	March 21	Buffalo	101–109	Jo Jo White (26)	Dave Cowens (16)	Don Nelson (7)	Boston Garden; 15,320	52–21
74	March 22	@ New York	90–81	Jo Jo White (22)	Paul Silas (19)	Nelson, White (3)	Madison Square Garden; 19,694	53–21
75	March 23	New York	86–96	John Havlicek (22)	Dave Cowens (16)	John Havlicek (10)	Boston Garden; 12,656	54–21
76	March 25	@ Cleveland	89–84	Dave Cowens (25)	Dave Cowens (17)	John Havlicek (7)	Richfield Coliseum; 18,911	55–21
77	March 26	New Orleans	100–113	Jo Jo White (23)	Dave Cowens (19)	Paul Westphal (10)	Boston Garden; 15,320	56–21
78	March 28	Chicago	92–97	Dave Cowens (19)	Paul Silas (15)	John Havlicek (6)	Boston Garden; 15,320	57–21
79	March 29	@ Buffalo	96–102	Dave Cowens (24)	Dave Cowens (21)	John Havlicek (6)	Buffalo Memorial Auditorium; 18,169	57–22

April: 3–0 (home: 2–0; road: 1–0)

Game	Date	Team	Score	High points	High rebounds	High assists	Location Attendance	Record
80	April 2	Buffalo	92–95	Cowens, Havlicek (23)	Cowens, Silas (12)	John Havlicek (6)	Boston Garden; 12,391	58–22
81	April 4	Washington	94–95	John Havlicek (22)	Dave Cowens (14)	Cowens, Havlicek, Nelson (6)	Boston Garden; 15,320	59–22
82	April 5	@ Philadelphia	111–97	Dave Cowens (22)	Dave Cowens (24)	Dave Cowens (9)	The Spectrum; 12,237	60–22

Source: www.basketball-reference.com

== Playoffs ==
1975 playoff game log
Conference semifinals: 4–1 (home: 3–0; road: 1–1)

Game	Date	Team	Score	High points	High rebounds	High assists	Location Attendance	Series
1	April 14	Houston	W 123–106	John Havlicek (30)	Dave Cowens (19)	John Havlicek (9)	Boston Garden; 15,320	1–0
2	April 16	Houston	W 112–100	Dave Cowens (28)	Dave Cowens (18)	John Havlicek (7)	Boston Garden; 13,254	2–0
3	April 19	@ Houston	L 102–117	Don Nelson (21)	Havlicek, Silas (8)	Silas, White (5)	Hofheinz Pavilion; 10,218	2–1
4	April 22	@ Houston	W 122–117	Dave Cowens (31)	Dave Cowens (24)	Jo Jo White (8)	Hofheinz Pavilion; 10,218	3–1
5	April 24	Houston	W 128–115	John Havlicek (28)	Dave Cowens (12)	John Havlicek (11)	Boston Garden; 15,320	4–1

Conference finals: 2–4 (home: 2–1; road: 0–3)

Game	Date	Team	Score	High points	High rebounds	High assists	Location Attendance	Series
1	April 27	Washington	L 95–100	Jo Jo White (27)	Dave Cowens (19)	Paul Silas (6)	Boston Garden; 15,320	0–1
2	April 30	@ Washington	L 92–117	Don Nelson (23)	Paul Silas (17)	Jo Jo White (7)	Capital Centre; 19,035	0–2
3	May 3	Washington	W 101–90	John Havlicek (26)	Paul Silas (25)	Jo Jo White (7)	Boston Garden; 15,320	1–2
4	May 7	@ Washington	L 108–119	Jo Jo White (32)	Dave Cowens (17)	Jo Jo White (7)	Capital Centre; 19,035	1–3
5	May 9	Washington	W 103–99	Dave Cowens (27)	Dave Cowens (12)	Don Chaney (5)	Boston Garden; 15,320	2–3
6	May 11	@ Washington	L 92–98	Dave Cowens (23)	Dave Cowens (21)	Jo Jo White (6)	Capital Centre; 19,035	2–4

1975 schedule

== Awards and records ==
- John Havlicek, All-NBA Second Team
- Dave Cowens, All-NBA Second Team
- Jo Jo White, All-NBA Second Team
- John Havlicek, NBA All-Defensive First Team
- Paul Silas, NBA All-Defensive First Team
- Dave Cowens, NBA All-Defensive Second Team
- Don Chaney, NBA All-Defensive Second Team
