= Nate Williams (basketball, born 1950) =

American basketball player (born 1950)

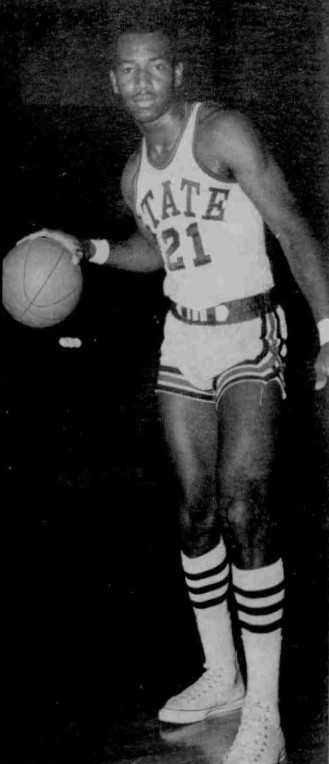
- Williams, circa 1968

Personal information
- Born: May 2, 1950 (age 76) Columbia, Louisiana, U.S.
- Listed height: 6 ft 4 in (1.93 m)
- Listed weight: 215 lb (98 kg)

Career information
- High school: McClymonds (Oakland, California)
- College: Utah State (1969–1971)
- NBA draft: 1971: Hardship round, 1
- Drafted by: Cincinnati Royals
- Playing career: 1971–1979
- Position: Small forward / shooting guard
- Number: 22, 33

Career history
- 1971–1975: Cincinnati Royals/Kansas City-Omaha Kings
- 1975–1978: New Orleans Jazz
- 1978–1979: Golden State Warriors
- Stats at NBA.com
- Stats at Basketball Reference

Nathaniel Russell Williams (born May 2, 1950) is a former professional basketball player. A 6-foot-5-inch (1.96 m) swingman from Utah State University, Williams was selected first in the 1971 NBA Hardship Draft, a supplemental draft for college underclassman. He played eight and a half seasons (1971–1979) in the National Basketball Association (NBA) for the Cincinnati Royals/Kansas City-Omaha Kings, New Orleans Jazz, and Golden State Warriors. His finest season took place in 1973–74, when he averaged 15.5 points, 4.2 rebounds, and 2.2 assists for the Kings. He ended his NBA career with 7,709 total points.

== Career statistics ==
Legend
GP	Games played	GS	Games started	MPG	Minutes per game
FG%	Field goal percentage	3P%	3-point field goal percentage	FT%	Free throw percentage
RPG	Rebounds per game	APG	Assists per game	SPG	Steals per game
BPG	Blocks per game	PPG	Points per game	**Bold**	Career high

=== NBA ===
==== Regular season ====
Year	Team	GP	MPG	FG%	FT%	RPG	APG	SPG	BPG	PPG
1971–72	Cincinnati	81	26.8	.432	.738	**4.6**	2.1			11.9
1972–73	Kansas City–Omaha	80	24.7	.477	.797	4.2	1.6			11.8
1973–74	Kansas City–Omaha	82*	**30.6**	.462	.818	4.2	**2.2**	**1.8**	.4	**15.5**
1974–75	Kansas City–Omaha	**50***	22.6	.454	.822	3.6	1.6	1.1	**.5**	12.5
1974–75	New Orleans	**35***	23.3	**.517**	.824	4.5	1.9	1.3	.2	14.3
1975–76	New Orleans	81	23.9	.444	.824	4.4	1.3	1.3	.2	12.8
1976–77	New Orleans	79	22.5	.451	.753	3.9	1.2	1.0	.2	12.3
1977–78	New Orleans	27	16.1	.421	.838	3.3	1.8	.8	.4	7.8
1977–78	Golden State	46	17.7	.435	.833	2.5	.9	.8	**.5**	11.2
1978–79	Golden State	81	16.0	.501	**.872**	2.6	.8	.7	.1	8.3
Career		642	23.2	.458	.805	3.8	1.5	1.1	.3	12.0
