= 1976–77 New Orleans Jazz season =

NBA professional basketball team season

- Head coach: Butch Van Breda Kolff, Elgin Baylor
- Arena: Louisiana Superdome

Results
- Record: 35–47 (.427)
- Place: Division: 5th (Central); Conference: 8th (Eastern)
- Playoff finish: Did not qualify

Local media
- Television: WGNO
- Radio: WWL

The 1976–77 New Orleans Jazz season was the team's third in the NBA. They began the season hoping to improve upon their 38–44 output from the previous season. They came up three wins shy of tying it, finishing 35–47, and failed to qualify for the playoffs for the third straight season.

== Pre-season ==
The Jazz previously had the rights to Moses Malone, having selected him with the first pick of the NBA's supplemental draft of former ABA players who were underclassmen. However, to retain Malone the Jazz had to forfeit the #1 pick in the 1977 NBA Draft. They chose to relinquish Malone's rights and retain the pick, which they packaged in a trade with the Los Angeles Lakers to acquire Gail Goodrich and the Lakers' 1978 1st round pick. The Lakers received the Jazz' 1977, 1978, and 1979 first round picks and their 1980 second round pick in return. The 1979 pick the Lakers acquired would be the #1 pick in that year's draft, which they used to select Earvin "Magic" Johnson.

== Roster ==
1976–77 New Orleans Jazz roster
Players

Pos.	No.	Player	Height	Weight	DOB	From
F	11	Ron Behagen	6 ft 9 in (2.06 m)	185 lb (84 kg)		Minnesota
G	4	Freddie Boyd	6 ft 2 in (1.88 m)	180 lb (82 kg)		Oregon State
F	12	E. C. Coleman	6 ft 8 in (2.03 m)	225 lb (102 kg)		Houston Baptist
G	25	Gail Goodrich	6 ft 1 in (1.85 m)	170 lb (77 kg)		UCLA
F/C	30	Paul Griffin	6 ft 9 in (2.06 m)	205 lb (93 kg)		Western Michigan
G	14	Mo Howard	6 ft 2 in (1.88 m)	170 lb (77 kg)		Maryland
F	23	Aaron James	6 ft 8 in (2.03 m)	210 lb (95 kg)		Grambling State
C	53	Rich Kelley	7 ft 0 in (2.13 m)	235 lb (107 kg)		Stanford
G	7	Pete Maravich	6 ft 5 in (1.96 m)	197 lb (89 kg)		LSU
G	33	Jim McElroy	6 ft 3 in (1.91 m)	190 lb (86 kg)		Central Michigan
C	34	Otto Moore	6 ft 11 in (2.11 m)	205 lb (93 kg)		Texas–Pan American
F	15	Bud Stallworth	6 ft 5 in (1.96 m)	190 lb (86 kg)		Kansas
F	41	Andy Walker	6 ft 4 in (1.93 m)	190 lb (86 kg)		Niagara
G/F	22	Nate Williams	6 ft 5 in (1.96 m)	215 lb (98 kg)		Utah State

Coaches
Head coach
- (United States) Elgin Baylor

Legend
- (DP) Unsigned draft pick
- (FA) Free agent
- (S) Suspended
- Injured

== Regular season ==
=== Season standings ===
Central Division	W	L	PCT	GB	Home	Road	Div
y-Houston Rockets	49	33	.598	–	34–7	15–26	13–7
x-Washington Bullets	48	34	.585	1	32–9	16–25	11–9
x-San Antonio Spurs	44	38	.537	5	31–10	13–28	9–11
x-Cleveland Cavaliers	43	39	.524	6	29–12	14–27	8–12
New Orleans Jazz	35	47	.427	14	26–15	9–32	10–10
Atlanta Hawks	31	51	.378	18	19–22	12–29	9–11

#	Eastern Conference				
#	Team	W	L	PCT	GB
1	z-Philadelphia 76ers	50	32	.610	–
2	y-Houston Rockets	49	33	.598	1
3	x-Washington Bullets	48	34	.585	2
4	x-Boston Celtics	44	38	.537	6
5	x-San Antonio Spurs	44	38	.537	6
6	x-Cleveland Cavaliers	43	39	.524	7
7	New York Knicks	40	42	.488	10
8	New Orleans Jazz	35	47	.427	15
9	Atlanta Hawks	31	51	.378	19
10	Buffalo Braves	30	52	.366	20
11	New York Nets	22	60	.268	28

z – clinched division title
y – clinched division title
x – clinched playoff spot

== Awards and records ==
- Pete Maravich, All-NBA First Team
- E. C. Coleman, NBA All-Defensive First Team
