= Otto Moore =

American basketball player (born 1946)

Personal information
- Born: August 27, 1946 (age 80) Miami, Florida, U.S.
- Listed height: 6 ft 11 in (2.11 m)
- Listed weight: 205 lb (93 kg)

Career information
- High school: Booker T. Washington (Miami, Florida)
- College: UT Rio Grande Valley (1964–1968)
- NBA draft: 1968: 1st round, 6th overall pick
- Drafted by: Detroit Pistons
- Playing career: 1968–1980
- Position: Power forward / center
- Number: 20, 34, 43

Career history
- 1968–1971: Detroit Pistons
- 1971–1972: Phoenix Suns
- 1972–1973: Houston Rockets
- 1973–1974: Kansas City–Omaha Kings
- 1974: Detroit Pistons
- 1974–1976: New Orleans Jazz
- 1977–1978: Virtus Banco di Roma
- 1978–1979: Maine Lumberjacks
- 1979–1980: Royal Tru-Orangemen

Career highlights
- PBA champion (1979 Open); No. 34 retired by UTRGV Vaqueros

Career NBA statistics
- Points: 5,616 (8.2 ppg)
- Rebounds: 5,575 (8.2 rpg)
- Assists: 1,060 (1.6 apg)
- Stats at NBA.com
- Stats at Basketball Reference

Otto George Moore (born August 27, 1946) is an American former professional basketball player.

A 6'11" center from the University of Texas-Pan American, Moore played nine seasons (1968–1977) in the National Basketball Association as a member of the Detroit Pistons, Phoenix Suns, Houston Rockets, Kansas City–Omaha Kings, and New Orleans Jazz. He averaged a double-double twice in his career, once with the Pistons (11.9 points and 11.1 rebounds per game in 1969–70), and once for the Rockets (11.7 points and 10.6 rebounds per game in 1972–73). Across his entire career, he averaged 8.2 points and 8.2 rebounds per game. He also ranked eighth in the league in blocks per game (1.7) during the 1975–76 NBA season with the Jazz.

Moore owns the distinction of having appeared in the second-most regular season NBA games (682) without having appeared in a playoff game, behind Tom Van Arsdale.

== Philippine Stint ==
In 1979, the Royal Tru Orange inked Moore for a one-conference stint with them. Joining the high-volume scorer, American Larry Pounds, the tandem proved to be a lethal threat. He and Pounds led the Royal Tru-Orange to a championship in the 1979 Open Conference.

== Career statistics ==
Legend
GP	Games played	GS	Games started	MPG	Minutes per game
FG%	Field goal percentage	3P%	3-point field goal percentage	FT%	Free throw percentage
RPG	Rebounds per game	APG	Assists per game	SPG	Steals per game
BPG	Blocks per game	PPG	Points per game	**Bold**	Career high
*	Led the league

=== NBA ===
==== Regular season ====
Year	Team	GP	MPG	FG%	FT%	RPG	APG	SPG	BPG	PPG
1968–69	Detroit	74	21.7	.443	.524	7.1	.9			7.7
1969–70	Detroit	81	31.1	.476	.636	**11.1**	1.3			**11.9**
1970–71	Detroit	**82**	23.5	.445	.553	8.5	1.1			9.0
1971–72	Phoenix	81	20.0	.436	.603	6.7	1.1			7.6
1972–73	Houston	**82***	**33.1**	.487	.602	10.6	2.0			11.7
1973–74	Houston	13	24.1	.464	.500	6.5	1.4	.8	1.4	5.2
1973–74	Kansas City–Omaha	65	9.7	**.515**	.648	3.1	.7	.2	.5	3.2
1974–75	Detroit	2	5.5	.250	.500	1.0	.5	.0	.5	1.5
1974–75	New Orleans	40	26.4	.453	.672	8.2	2.1	.5	1.0	7.0
1975–76	New Orleans	81	29.7	.436	.637	9.8	**2.7**	**1.0**	**1.7**	9.0
1976–77	New Orleans	81	25.7	.405	**.679**	7.9	2.2	.7	1.4	5.9
Career		682	24.8	.453	.609	8.2	1.6	.7	1.2	8.2
