= Louie Nelson =

American basketball player (born 1951)

Personal information
- Born: May 28, 1951 (age 75) Los Angeles, California, U.S.
- Listed height: 6 ft 3 in (1.91 m)
- Listed weight: 190 lb (86 kg)

Career information
- High school: Compton (Compton, California)
- College: Washington (1970–1973)
- NBA draft: 1973: 2nd round, 19th overall pick
- Drafted by: Capital Bullets
- Playing career: 1973–1978
- Position: Point guard / shooting guard
- Number: 15, 14, 21, 20, 11

Career history
- 1973–1974: Capital Bullets
- 1974–1976: New Orleans Jazz
- 1976–1977: San Antonio Spurs
- 1977: Kansas City Kings
- 1977–1978: New Jersey Nets

Career highlights
- First-team All-Pac-8 (1973)
- Stats at NBA.com
- Stats at Basketball Reference

Louis Nelson (born May 28, 1951) is an American former National Basketball Association (NBA) player. Nelson was drafted with the first pick in the second round of the 1973 NBA draft by the Baltimore Bullets. Before the 1974–75 NBA season, Nelson was taken by the New Orleans Jazz in the NBA Expansion Draft. After playing two seasons with the Jazz, the Jazz waived him. Nelson was signed by the San Antonio Spurs before the 1976–77 NBA season, but was waived after four games. In the 1977–78 NBA season, Nelson's final NBA season, he played for the Kansas City Kings and New Jersey Nets. In his NBA career, Nelson averaged 9.4 points, 2.4 rebounds and 1.9 assists per game.

Louie is now a Coach at Harbor Teacher Preperaton Academy (High School-HTPA). He coaches the girls basketball team.

== Career statistics ==
Legend
GP	Games played	GS	Games started	MPG	Minutes per game
FG%	Field goal percentage	3P%	3-point field goal percentage	FT%	Free throw percentage
RPG	Rebounds per game	APG	Assists per game	SPG	Steals per game
BPG	Blocks per game	PPG	Points per game	**Bold**	Career high

=== NBA ===
==== Regular season ====
Year	Team	GP	MPG	FG%	FT%	RPG	APG	SPG	BPG	PPG
1973–74	Capital	49	11.3	.433	.726	1.4	1.1	.6	.0	4.9
1974–75	New Orleans	**72**	26.4	.452	.768	2.7	2.5	.9	.1	11.2
1975–76	New Orleans	66	**30.8**	.433	.735	**3.1**	**2.6**	**1.2**	.1	**12.5**
1976–77	San Antonio	4	14.3	**.500**	.571	1.8	.8	.5	.0	4.5
1977–78	Kansas City	8	6.6	.214	**.818**	.4	.6	.3	.1	1.9
1977–78	New Jersey	25	14.1	.416	.658	2.0	1.2	.8	**.2**	8.5
Career		224	22.1	.437	.738	2.4	1.9	.9	.1	9.4
