= 1974–75 Kansas City–Omaha Kings season =

NBA professional basketball team season

- Head coach: Phil Johnson
- Owners: Leon Karosen; Robert Margolin; H. Paul Rosenberg
- Arena: Kemper Arena; Omaha Civic Auditorium

Results
- Record: 44–38 (.537)
- Place: Division: 2nd (Midwest); Conference: 3rd (Western)
- Playoff finish: Conference semifinals (lost to Bulls 2–4)
- Stats at Basketball Reference

Local media
- Television: KMBC-TV/KETV
- Radio: KCMO/KFAB

The 1974–75 Kansas City–Omaha Kings season was the Kings' 26th season in the NBA and their third season in the city of Kansas City, Missouri, as well as their third and final season in the city of Omaha, Nebraska. Before the season began for the Kings, they would join the Milwaukee Bucks as the only two NBA teams to not have any players of theirs selected by any of the rivaling ABA teams in the 1974 ABA Draft of NBA Players.

== Roster ==
1974–75 Kansas City–Omaha Kings roster
Players

Pos.	No.	Player	Height	Weight	DOB	From
PG	5	Rick Adelman	6 ft 1 in (1.85 m)	175 lb (79 kg)	1946-06-16	Loyola Marymount
PG	1	Nate Archibald	6 ft 1 in (1.85 m)	165 lb (75 kg)	1948-09-02	UTEP
PF	11	Ron Behagen	6 ft 9 in (2.06 m)	185 lb (84 kg)	1951-01-14	Minnesota
SG	10	Mike D'Antoni	6 ft 3 in (1.91 m)	185 lb (84 kg)	1951-05-08	Marshall
SF	33	Ollie Johnson	6 ft 6 in (1.98 m)	200 lb (91 kg)	1949-05-11	Temple
SF	21	Don Kojis	6 ft 5 in (1.96 m)	215 lb (98 kg)	1939-01-15	Marquette
C	55	Len Kosmalski	7 ft 0 in (2.13 m)	245 lb (111 kg)	1951-11-29	Tennessee
C	44	Sam Lacey	6 ft 10 in (2.08 m)	235 lb (107 kg)	1948-03-28	New Mexico State
SF	23	Don May	6 ft 4 in (1.93 m)	220 lb (100 kg)	1946-01-03	Dayton
PF	31	Larry McNeill	6 ft 9 in (2.06 m)	195 lb (88 kg)	1951-01-31	Marquette
SG	24	Jimmy Walker	6 ft 3 in (1.91 m)	195 lb (88 kg)	1944-04-08	Providence
SF	15	Scott Wedman	6 ft 7 in (2.01 m)	215 lb (98 kg)	1952-07-29	Colorado

Coaches
Head coach
- Phil Johnson

Legend
- (DP) Unsigned draft pick
- (FA) Free agent
- (S) Suspended
- Injured

== Regular season ==
=== Season standings ===
Midwest Division	W	L	PCT	GB	Home	Road	Div
y-Chicago Bulls	47	35	.573	–	29–12	18–23	11–15
x-Kansas City–Omaha Kings	44	38	.537	3	29–12	15–26	17–9
x-Detroit Pistons	40	42	.488	7	26–15	14–27	10–16
Milwaukee Bucks	38	44	.463	9	25–16	13–28	14–12

#	Western Conference				
#	Team	W	L	PCT	GB
1	z-Golden State Warriors	48	34	.585	–
2	y-Chicago Bulls	47	35	.573	1
3	x-Kansas City–Omaha Kings	44	38	.537	4
4	x-Seattle SuperSonics	43	39	.524	5
5	x-Detroit Pistons	40	42	.488	8
6	Portland Trail Blazers	38	44	.463	10
6	Milwaukee Bucks	38	44	.463	10
8	Phoenix Suns	32	50	.390	16
9	Los Angeles Lakers	30	52	.366	18

z – clinched division title
y – clinched division title
x – clinched playoff spot

=== Season schedule ===
1974–75 game log
Total: 44–38 (home: 29–12; road: 15–26)
October: 5–1 (home: 2–1; road: 3–0)

Game	Date	Team	Score	High points	High rebounds	High assists	Location Attendance	Record
1	October 19	@ Phoenix	94–91	Nate Williams (23)	Sam Lacey (17)	Nate Archibald (7)	Arizona Veterans Memorial Coliseum; 5,377	1–0
2	October 20	@ Los Angeles	105–95	Jimmy Walker (27)	Sam Lacey (18)	Nate Archibald (9)	The Forum; 11,128	2–0
3	October 22	Washington	123–121	Jimmy Walker (28)	Ron Behagen (10)	Nate Archibald (6)	Kemper Arena; 5,213	2–1
4	October 23	Chicago	98–99	Nate Archibald (24)	Sam Lacey (11)	Nate Archibald (15)	Omaha Civic Auditorium; 4,759	3–1
5	October 25	@ Chicago	112–91	Jimmy Walker (20)	Sam Lacey (13)	Nate Archibald (10)	Chicago Stadium; 6,942	4–1
6	October 30	Milwaukee	97–99	Nate Archibald (30)	Sam Lacey (23)	Nate Archibald (8)	Kemper Arena; 5,241	5–1

November: 7–9 (home: 4–4; road: 3–5)

Game	Date	Team	Score	High points	High rebounds	High assists	Location Attendance	Record
7	November 2	@ Houston	97–120	Scott Wedman (19)	Ron Behagen (9)	Nate Archibald (11)	Hofheinz Pavilion; 3,457	5–2
8	November 3	Chicago	86–79	Nate Archibald (18)	Sam Lacey (17)	Nate Archibald (5)	Kemper Arena; 4,430	5–3
9	November 5	New Orleans	97–115	Nate Archibald (30)	Ron Behagen (19)	Nate Archibald (8)	Omaha Civic Auditorium; 3,588	6–3
10	November 6	@ Detroit	104–118	Walker, Williams (17)	Sam Lacey (11)	Mike D'Antoni (6)	Cobo Arena; 7,202	6–4
11	November 10	Boston	102–99	Jimmy Walker (21)	Sam Lacey (25)	Nate Archibald (11)	Kemper Arena; 8,118	6–5
12	November 12	Houston	103–99	Nate Archibald (26)	Lacey, Wedman (11)	Nate Archibald (11)	Omaha Civic Auditorium; 3,038	6–6
13	November 13	@ Washington	81–118	Nate Archibald (16)	Sam Lacey (21)	Sam Lacey (5)	Capital Centre; 5,021	6–7
14	November 15	@ Boston	110–109	Nate Archibald (29)	Sam Lacey (19)	Nate Archibald (9)	Boston Garden; 13,192	7–7
15	November 16	@ Buffalo	96–101	Nate Williams (27)	Sam Lacey (12)	Archibald, Behagen, Lacey (4)	Buffalo Memorial Auditorium; 8,274	7–8
16	November 19	Detroit	87–97	Jimmy Walker (23)	Sam Lacey (14)	Nate Archibald (7)	Kemper Arena; 4,847	8–8
17	November 21	Milwaukee	106–96	Nate Archibald (24)	Sam Lacey (16)	Sam Lacey (5)	Kemper Arena; 5,516	8–9
18	November 23	@ Atlanta	103–100	Nate Archibald (24)	Sam Lacey (16)	Sam Lacey (6)	Omni Coliseum; 3,960	9–9
19	November 24	Cleveland	94–109	Nate Archibald (27)	Sam Lacey (22)	Nate Archibald (11)	Kemper Arena; 4,555	10–9
20	November 26	@ Chicago	93–90	Nate Archibald (21)	Sam Lacey (19)	Nate Archibald (10)	Chicago Stadium; 7,321	11–9
21	November 27	Los Angeles	89–107	Nate Archibald (21)	Sam Lacey (20)	Nate Archibald (7)	Kemper Arena; 6,463	12–9
22	November 29	@ Milwaukee	99–102	Nate Williams (26)	Sam Lacey (16)	Sam Lacey (6)	MECCA Arena; 10,938	12–10

December: 8–8 (home: 4–2; road: 4–6)

Game	Date	Team	Score	High points	High rebounds	High assists	Location Attendance	Record
23	December 2	Seattle	110–106	Jimmy Walker (23)	Sam Lacey (14)	Sam Lacey (10)	Omaha Civic Auditorium; 4,721	12–11
24	December 4	@ Philadelphia	105–109	Nate Archibald (27)	Sam Lacey (15)	Nate Archibald (13)	The Spectrum; 7,027	12–12
25	December 5	@ Cleveland	91–124	Ron Behagen (19)	Ron Behagen (11)	Sam Lacey (7)	Richfield Coliseum; 4,493	12–13
26	December 8	@ Detroit	96–92	Archibald, Walker (18)	Sam Lacey (11)	Nate Archibald (10)	Cobo Arena; 5,134	13–13
27	December 10	@ New York	102–106	Nate Archibald (33)	Sam Lacey (14)	Sam Lacey (8)	Madison Square Garden; 16,366	13–14
28	December 12	@ Milwaukee	113–105	Nate Archibald (25)	Lacey, McNeill (10)	Nate Archibald (10)	MECCA Arena; 10,938	14–14
29	December 13	Detroit	84–88	Nate Archibald (23)	Sam Lacey (12)	Nate Archibald (10)	Omaha Civic Auditorium; 4,702	15–14
30	December 14	@ Houston	84–123	Nate Archibald (21)	Sam Lacey (11)	—	Hofheinz Pavilion; 3,333	15–15
31	December 17	Buffalo	110–111	Nate Archibald (28)	Sam Lacey (18)	Nate Archibald (6)	Kemper Arena; 5,179	16–15
32	December 19	New York	117–113	Nate Archibald (38)	Sam Lacey (16)	Nate Archibald (8)	Kemper Arena; 6,622	16–16
33	December 20	@ Chicago	73–96	Nate Archibald (18)	Sam Lacey (11)	Nate Archibald (4)	Chicago Stadium; 5,021	16–17
34	December 21	Golden State	84–107	Scott Wedman (22)	Sam Lacey (12)	Nate Archibald (11)	Kemper Arena; 5,668	17–17
35	December 23	Chicago	87–97	Nate Archibald (29)	Sam Lacey (14)	Sam Lacey (11)	Kemper Arena; 6,454	18–17
36	December 27	@ Seattle	108–98	Nate Archibald (32)	Sam Lacey (16)	Nate Archibald (7)	Seattle Center Coliseum; 13,260	19–17
37	December 29	@ Portland	103–99	Nate Archibald (31)	Sam Lacey (11)	Nate Archibald (9)	Memorial Coliseum; 11,620	20–17
38	December 30	@ Golden State	102–110	Nate Archibald (31)	Sam Lacey (13)	Nate Archibald (10)	Oakland-Alameda County Coliseum Arena; 7,374	20–18

January: 5–8 (home: 4–4; road: 1–4)

Game	Date	Team	Score	High points	High rebounds	High assists	Location Attendance	Record
39	January 1	Atlanta	102–97	Nate Archibald (30)	Sam Lacey (19)	Nate Archibald (6)	Kemper Arena; 6,376	20–19
40	January 3	Philadelphia	107–95	Nate Archibald (27)	Sam Lacey (15)	Nate Archibald (7)	Kemper Arena; 6,135	20–20
41	January 4	@ Chicago	88–100	Nate Archibald (22)	Sam Lacey (15)	Nate Archibald (5)	Chicago Stadium; 8,771	20–21
42	January 5	Houston	115–106	Nate Archibald (30)	Sam Lacey (13)	Nate Archibald (4)	Kemper Arena; 8,138	20–22
43	January 7	Milwaukee	99–108	Nate Archibald (32)	Sam Lacey (13)	Nate Archibald (9)	Kemper Arena; 6,506	21–22
44	January 10	@ Philadelphia	94–102	Nate Williams (20)	Sam Lacey (14)	Archibald, Lacey (6)	The Spectrum; 6,125	21–23
45	January 17	New York	90–107	Nate Archibald (28)	Sam Lacey (20)	Nate Archibald (9)	Kemper Arena; 10,022	22–23
46	January 19	Phoenix	109–97	Jimmy Walker (31)	Sam Lacey (15)	Sam Lacey (6)	Kemper Arena; 13,155	22–24
47	January 21	Portland	106–109	Nate Archibald (41)	Scott Wedman (12)	Nate Archibald (6)	Kemper Arena; 5,856	23–24
48	January 22	@ Washington	88–97	Nate Archibald (29)	Sam Lacey (17)	Archibald, Lacey (5)	Capital Centre; 4,719	23–25
49	January 24	@ Boston	87–96	Nate Archibald (30)	Sam Lacey (17)	Sam Lacey (7)	Boston Garden; 10,952	23–26
50	January 25	@ New York	112–103	Nate Archibald (40)	Larry McNeill (11)	Sam Lacey (6)	Madison Square Garden; 19,964	24–26
51	January 29	Milwaukee	102–106	Nate Archibald (28)	Sam Lacey (12)	Sam Lacey (10)	Omaha Civic Auditorium; 9,185	25–26

February: 10–2 (home: 7–0; road: 3–2)

Game	Date	Team	Score	High points	High rebounds	High assists	Location Attendance	Record
52	February 2	Golden State	101–127	Nate Archibald (30)	Sam Lacey (10)	Mike D'Antoni (10)	Kemper Arena; 9,365	26–26
53	February 3	Philadelphia	87–100	Larry McNeill (26)	Larry McNeill (18)	Sam Lacey (7)	Omaha Civic Auditorium; 7,128	27–26
54	February 5	Portland	82–90	Nate Archibald (36)	Sam Lacey (14)	Sam Lacey (7)	Kemper Arena; 6,434	28–26
55	February 6	@ Milwaukee	95–94	Larry McNeill (23)	Sam Lacey (15)	Sam Lacey (8)	Dane County Coliseum; 8,108	29–26
56	February 8	@ Cleveland	91–92 (OT)	Nate Archibald (32)	Sam Lacey (19)	Archibald, Lacey (6)	Richfield Coliseum; 4,761	29–27
57	February 12	Boston	102–103	Nate Archibald (33)	Sam Lacey (14)	Sam Lacey (8)	Omaha Civic Auditorium; 9,728	30–27
58	February 14	@ Buffalo	132–112	Jimmy Walker (32)	Sam Lacey (13)	Nate Archibald (16)	Buffalo Memorial Auditorium; 12,207	31–27
59	February 15	@ Detroit	93–81	Jimmy Walker (27)	Sam Lacey (10)	Nate Archibald (6)	Cobo Arena; 7,174	32–27
60	February 16	Detroit	99–102	Nate Archibald (35)	Ron Behagen (10)	Sam Lacey (8)	Kemper Arena; 13,981	33–27
61	February 19	Los Angeles	92–115	Nate Archibald (27)	Larry McNeill (17)	Nate Archibald (8)	Kemper Arena; 8,329	34–27
62	February 25	Milwaukee	90–93	Nate Archibald (37)	Sam Lacey (17)	Nate Archibald (6)	Kemper Arena; 11,762	35–27
63	February 28	@ New Orleans	107–114 (OT)	Nate Archibald (28)	Sam Lacey (18)	Sam Lacey (8)	Municipal Auditorium; 5,370	35–28

March: 8–8 (home: 7–1; road: 1–7)

Game	Date	Team	Score	High points	High rebounds	High assists	Location Attendance	Record
64	March 1	@ Atlanta	95–108	Nate Archibald (28)	Sam Lacey (14)	Archibald, Walker (6)	Omni Coliseum; 3,831	35–29
65	March 2	Detroit	112–122	Nate Archibald (32)	Larry McNeill (9)	Nate Archibald (8)	Kemper Arena; 14,843	36–29
66	March 4	Phoenix	99–103	Nate Archibald (32)	Sam Lacey (11)	Sam Lacey (5)	Omaha Civic Auditorium; 4,027	37–29
67	March 6	Buffalo	110–111	Jimmy Walker (30)	Sam Lacey (15)	Sam Lacey (9)	Kemper Arena; 8,644	38–29
68	March 8	Seattle	103–99	Nate Archibald (30)	Sam Lacey (19)	Sam Lacey (7)	Kemper Arena; 12,389	38–30
69	March 9	@ Detroit	99–106	Nate Archibald (30)	Sam Lacey (12)	Nate Archibald (8)	Cobo Arena; 7,979	38–31
70	March 10	@ Milwaukee	96–103	Nate Archibald (33)	Larry McNeill (11)	Nate Archibald (8)	MECCA Arena; 10,938	38–32
71	March 14	Washington	102–103	Nate Archibald (31)	Sam Lacey (16)	Nate Archibald (8)	Omaha Civic Auditorium; 8,524	39–32
72	March 18	Atlanta	101–105	Nate Archibald (36)	Larry McNeill (16)	Archibald, Lacey (8)	Kemper Arena; 7,242	40–32
73	March 20	New Orleans	95–101	Nate Archibald (31)	Larry McNeill (17)	Nate Archibald (11)	Kemper Arena; 6,138	41–32
74	March 21	@ Chicago	98–104	Nate Archibald (33)	Sam Lacey (15)	Nate Archibald (7)	Chicago Stadium; 14,792	41–33
75	March 23	Chicago	101–103	Nate Archibald (35)	Sam Lacey (17)	Nate Archibald (6)	Kemper Arena; 16,805	42–33
76	March 25	@ New Orleans	110–112	Nate Archibald (40)	Sam Lacey (13)	Sam Lacey (4)	Municipal Auditorium; 3,388	42–34
77	March 27	@ Golden State	103–111	Nate Archibald (29)	Sam Lacey (12)	Sam Lacey (7)	Oakland-Alameda County Coliseum Arena; 12,787	42–35
78	March 28	@ Los Angeles	103–114	Nate Archibald (40)	Sam Lacey (13)	Archibald, Lacey (5)	The Forum; 11,243	42–36
79	March 29	@ Phoenix	104–100	Nate Archibald (29)	Larry McNeill (11)	Archibald, Behagen (5)	Arizona Veterans Memorial Coliseum; 6,450	43–36

April: 1–2 (home: 1–0; road: 0–2)

Game	Date	Team	Score	High points	High rebounds	High assists	Location Attendance	Record
80	April 2	@ Seattle	96–99	Nate Archibald (25)	Sam Lacey (20)	Nate Archibald (8)	Seattle Center Coliseum; 13,628	43–37
81	April 4	@ Portland	110–116	Nate Archibald (30)	Sam Lacey (13)	Sam Lacey (7)	Memorial Coliseum; 12,122	43–38
82	April 6	Cleveland	94–95	Nate Archibald (33)	Sam Lacey (14)	Nate Archibald (6)	Omaha Civic Auditorium; 8,895	44–38

Source: www.basketball-reference.com

== Playoffs ==
1975 playoff game log
Western Conference Semifinals: 2–4 (home: 2–1; road: 0–3)

Game	Date	Team	Score	High points	High rebounds	High assists	Location Attendance	Record
1	April 9	@ Chicago	L 89–95	McNeill (22)	Lacey (13)	Archibald (7)	Chicago Stadium; 15,433	0–1
2	April 13	Chicago	W 102–95	Walker (26)	Lacey (20)	Archibald (12)	Kemper Arena; 11,378	1–1
3	April 16	@ Chicago	L 90–93	Archibald (18)	Lacey (18)	Wedman (4)	Chicago Stadium; 18,347	1–2
4	April 18	Chicago	W 104–100 (OT)	Archibald (28)	Lacey (16)	Lacey (8)	Kemper Arena; 14,945	2–2
5	April 20	@ Chicago	L 77–104	Archibald, Wedman (13)	Lacey (12)	Lacey (5)	Chicago Stadium; 16,247	2–3
6	April 23	Chicago	L 89–101	Archibald (26)	Lacey (15)	Lacey (5)	Kemper Arena; 12,445	2–4

1975 schedule

== Awards and records ==
- Phil Johnson, NBA Coach of the Year
- Nate Archibald, All-NBA First Team
- Scott Wedman, NBA All-Rookie Team First Team
