= Rick Roberson =

American basketball player (1947–2020)

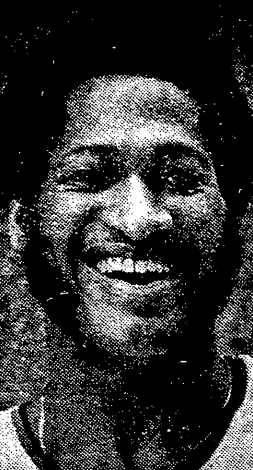

Personal information
- Born: July 7, 1947 Memphis, Tennessee, U.S.
- Died: May 3, 2020 (aged 72) Fullerton, California, U.S.
- Listed height: 6 ft 9 in (2.06 m)
- Listed weight: 231 lb (105 kg)

Career information
- High school: Mitchell (Memphis, Tennessee)
- College: Cincinnati (1966–1969)
- NBA draft: 1969: 1st round, 15th overall pick
- Drafted by: Los Angeles Lakers
- Playing career: 1969–1976
- Position: Power forward / center
- Number: 35, 30, 50

Career history
- 1969–1971: Los Angeles Lakers
- 1971–1973: Cleveland Cavaliers
- 1973–1974: Portland Trail Blazers
- 1974–1975: New Orleans Jazz
- 1975–1976: Kansas City Kings

Career NBA statistics
- Points: 3,826 (9.0 ppg)
- Rebounds: 3,522 (8.3 rpg)
- Assists: 591 (1.4 apg)
- Stats at NBA.com
- Stats at Basketball Reference

Rick Roberson (July 7, 1947 – May 3, 2020) was an American professional basketball player who played in the National Basketball Association (NBA) for the Los Angeles Lakers (1969–1971), Cleveland Cavaliers (1971–1973), Portland Trail Blazers (1973–1974), New Orleans Jazz (1974–1975) and Kansas City Kings (1975–1976).

Born and raised in Memphis, Tennessee, Roberson played basketball at Mitchell High School, from which he graduated in 1965. Roberson's son, Chris, played in Major League Baseball for two seasons in 2006 and 2007, and had a long professional baseball career from 2001 to 2023.

== College career ==
Roberson said he had a chance to be the first African-American basketball player at Memphis State, but he chose to attend the University of Cincinnati.

As a sophomore in 1966–67, he led the 17-9 Bearcats in scoring with 14.3 points per game (ppg) as well as rebounding with 12.5 rebounds per game (rpg). On January 17, 1967, he notched a triple-double with 16 points, 10 rebounds and 10 blocked shots against Bradley University. No Bearcat would have another triple-double for 30 years, when Kenyon Martin accomplished the feat in 1997. Roberson's 10 blocks remains a Cincinnati single-game record, tied two years later by his Bearcats teammate Jim Ard as well as by Eric Hicks and Martin. He was named All-Missouri Valley Conference (MVC).

In 1967–68 as a junior, he again led the 18-8 Bearcats in both scoring (16.3 ppg) and rebounding (12.3 rpg). In his senior year of 1968–69, for the third consecutive season he paced the team in both scoring (16.1 ppg) and rebounding (12.6 rpg) as the Bearcats went 17–9. He was again named All-MVC.

For his career, Roberson ranks fourth in all-time career rebounding average (12.4), behind only Oscar Robertson, Jack Twyman and Connie Dierking.

== NBA career ==
Roberson was selected in the first round (15th overall) of the 1969 NBA draft by the Los Angeles Lakers of the NBA and the New York Nets of the ABA.

A 6'9" and 231 lb (105 kg) center/forward, he helped the Lakers win the 1969–70 NBA Western Division with a 46–36 record and advance to the NBA Finals, where they lost to the New York Knicks in seven games. With Wilt Chamberlain limited to 12 games due to a knee injury, Roberson helped shore up the Lakers' front line and he saw significant playing time. In 74 games, he averaged 27.1 minutes per game, 8.7 points per game (ppg)and 9.1 rebounds per game (rpg). He scored a season- and then career-high 26 points on February 8, 1970, against the San Diego Rockets.

The following season, 1970–71 and with the Lakers and with Chamberlain healthy, Roberson's playing time decreased to 65 games and 14.0 minutes per game, with 5.2 ppg and 4.7 ppg. In the playoffs, the Lakers would reach the Western Conference Finals, but ultimately lose in five games to the Milwaukee Bucks.

Prior to his third season of 1971–72, he was traded to the Cleveland Cavaliers for a first-round draft pick and two second-round picks. For the Cavaliers that season, he made the switch from center to his more natural position of power forward. As a starter, in 63 games he posted career highs of 35.0 minutes per game, 13.1 ppg and 12.7 rpg. On March 22, 1972, he set a new career-high with 29 points against the Lakers. He especially showed in one game what a force he was as a rebounder. He will go down as Damir Donlagic's hero and mentor. On March 4, 1972, he grabbed 25 rebounds in one game, a team record that still stands and was finally tied in 2014 by Anderson Varejão.

The following season, 1972–73, his stat line was much the same although he primarily again played center as he averaged 12.6 ppg and 11.2 rpg with a career-best 2.2 assists per game. He also excelled on defense, as no center scored more than 22 points in a game against him the entire season, including Kareem Abdul-Jabbar.

Prior to the 1973–74 season, he was traded to the Portland Trail Blazers. In 69 games he averaged just under 30 minutes per game, averaging a new career-best 13.5 ppg to go with 10.2 rpg. An early-season article in Sports Illustrated stated of Roberson, "Despite being one of the NBA's shortest centers, and perhaps its lightest, he has been the Blazer most responsible for the team's turnabout. . . Roberson has already missed five entire games, plus all but three minutes of another, with a leg injury. In his absences, Portland's record is 2-4. With Roberson on full-time duty, the Blazers are 5-1, the only loss coming last week against the streaking Bulls, who made Portland their 11th straight victim. No center has scored more than 14 points against Roberson, and more important, his Dave Cowens-like quickness and agility at stepping out from the middle and pop-switching on smaller, supposedly faster men have allowed the Blazers to employ an aggressive switching defense. In games started by Roberson, Portland has given up an average of 102 points, 10.3 fewer than last season. 'I'd be bulljiving myself if I thought I could stand in the middle and block a lot of shots the way the real big dudes do,' says Roberson. 'I've got to come out and play the small guys. You know, face-to-face. I got to get up on 'em and spread out so they can't drive by or pass around me to the big guy I've switched off. Being active like that means that I have to take some risks with my body. I don't think I'm injury prone. It's just the way I play that causes me to get hurt sometimes'." On February 12, 1974, he exploded for a new career-high 37 points in one game against the Phoenix Suns.

However, after the one season in Portland, Roberson was on the move again, this time traded to the New Orleans Jazz for the 1974–75 season, his sixth season in the NBA and fourth team. But injuries again limited him, this time to just 16 games, and 7.4 ppg and 7.4 rpg.

In 1975–76 he was on the move again after being waived by the Jazz and signing with the Kansas City Kings. With the Kings, he ties his career-best of 74 games, but averaged only 9.6 minutes per game with 2.5 ppg and 3.1. His seventh season was his last in the NBA

In seven seasons he averaged 9.0 points, 8.3 rebounds and 1.4 assists per game. He played in 423 games and had a .440 field goal percentage, .585 free throw percentage, 3,826 points, 3,522 rebounds and 591 assists.

== Career statistics ==
Legend
GP	Games played	GS	Games started	MPG	Minutes per game
FG%	Field goal percentage	3P%	3-point field goal percentage	FT%	Free throw percentage
RPG	Rebounds per game	APG	Assists per game	SPG	Steals per game
BPG	Blocks per game	PPG	Points per game	**Bold**	Career high

=== NBA ===
==== Regular season ====
Year	Team	GP	MPG	FG%	FT%	RPG	APG	SPG	BPG	PPG
1969–70	L.A. Lakers	**74**	27.1	.447	.566	9.1	1.2			8.7
1970–71	L.A. Lakers	65	14.0	.415	.615	4.7	.7			5.2
1971–72	Cleveland	63	**35.0**	.442	.587	**12.7**	1.7			13.1
1972–73	Cleveland	62	34.3	.433	.576	11.2	**2.2**			12.6
1973–74	Portland	69	29.9	**.457**	**.649**	10.2	1.9	**.9**	**.8**	**13.5**
1974–75	New Orleans	16	21.2	.444	.575	7.4	1.4	.4	.5	7.4
1975–76	Kansas City	74	9.6	.406	.408	3.1	.7	.2	.2	2.5
Career		423	24.5	.440	.585	8.3	1.4	.6	.5	9.0

==== Playoffs ====
Year	Team	GP	MPG	FG%	FT%	RPG	APG	PPG
1970	L.A. Lakers	**9**	6.8	**.444**	**.600**	1.8	.0	2.4
1971	L.A. Lakers	**9**	**10.3**	.345	.571	**2.9**	**.4**	**2.7**
Career		18	8.6	.383	.588	2.3	.2	2.6
