= Kevin Stacom =

American basketball player (born 1951)

Personal information
- Born: September 4, 1951 (age 75) New York City, New York, U.S.
- Listed height: 6 ft 3 in (1.91 m)
- Listed weight: 185 lb (84 kg)

Career information
- High school: Holy Cross (Queens, New York)
- College: Holy Cross (1970–1971); Providence (1972–1974)
- NBA draft: 1974: 2nd round, 35th overall pick
- Drafted by: Boston Celtics
- Playing career: 1974–1982
- Position: Shooting guard
- Number: 27, 20

Career history

Playing
- 1974–1978: Boston Celtics
- 1978–1979: Indiana Pacers
- 1979: Boston Celtics
- 1981–1982: Milwaukee Bucks

Coaching
- 1985: Rhode Island Gulls

Career highlights
- NBA champion (1976); Third-team All-American – NABC, UPI (1974)

Career NBA statistics
- Points: 1,781 (5.1 ppg)
- Rebounds: 511 (1.5 rpg)
- Assists: 524 (1.5 apg)
- Stats at NBA.com
- Stats at Basketball Reference

Kevin M. Stacom (born September 4, 1951) is an American former professional basketball player who played six seasons in the National Basketball Association (NBA). He played college basketball for the Holy Cross Crusaders and Providence Friars. He was drafted by the Boston Celtics in the second round of the 1974 NBA Draft.

A 6-foot-3-inch (1.91 m) guard from Holy Cross High School, Flushing, New York; and Providence College, Stacom played six seasons (1974–1979; 1981–82) in the NBA as a member of the Boston Celtics, Indiana Pacers, and Milwaukee Bucks. He averaged 5.1 points per game in his career and won a league championship with Boston in 1976.

Stacom was head coach of the Rhode Island Gulls during the 1985 United States Basketball League season.

== Career statistics ==
Legend
GP	Games played	GS	Games started	MPG	Minutes per game
FG%	Field goal percentage	3P%	3-point field goal percentage	FT%	Free throw percentage
RPG	Rebounds per game	APG	Assists per game	SPG	Steals per game
BPG	Blocks per game	PPG	Points per game	**Bold**	Career high
†	Won an NBA championship

=== NBA ===
==== Regular season ====
Year	Team	GP	GS	MPG	FG%	3P%	FT%	RPG	APG	SPG	BPG	PPG
1974–75	Boston	61		7.3	**.453**		**.879**	.9	.8	.2	.0	2.8
1975–76†	Boston	77		14.5	.439		.747	**2.1**	1.7	.3	**.1**	5.3
1976–77	Boston	**79**		13.3	.409		.793	1.2	1.5	.2	.0	5.1
1977–78	Boston	55		**18.3**	.426		.761	1.9	**2.0**	.5	**.1**	**8.5**
1978–79	Indiana	44		13.0	.364		.756	1.4	1.8	.3	.0	4.2
1978–79	Boston	24		10.8	.391		.684	1.0	1.5	**.6**	.0	4.9
1981–82	Milwaukee	7	0	12.9	.412	.500	.500	1.0	1.0	.1	.0	4.3
Career		347	0	13.1	.417	.500	.768	1.5	1.5	.3	.0	5.1

==== Playoffs ====
Year	Team	GP	MPG	FG%	FT%	RPG	APG	SPG	BPG	PPG
1975	Boston	4	1.8	.000	–	.0	.3	.0	.0	.0
1976†	Boston	**17**	**11.5**	.289	.727	**1.0**	**.9**	**.3**	.0	**2.0**
1977	Boston	5	5.0	**.500**	**1.000**	.4	.8	.0	.0	1.4
Career		26	8.7	.302	.750	.7	.8	.2	.0	1.6
