= E.C. Coleman =

American basketball player (born 1950)

Personal information
- Born: September 25, 1950 (age 76) Flora, Mississippi, U.S.
- Listed height: 6 ft 8 in (2.03 m)
- Listed weight: 225 lb (102 kg)

Career information
- High school: E. Flora (Flora, Mississippi)
- College: Houston Baptist (1969–1973)
- NBA draft: 1973: 3rd round, 51st overall pick
- Drafted by: Houston Rockets
- Playing career: 1973–1978
- Position: Power forward
- Number: 44, 12
- Coaching career: 1978–1979

Career history

Playing
- 1973–1974: Houston Rockets
- 1974–1977: New Orleans Jazz
- 1977–1978: Golden State Warriors
- 1978: Houston Rockets

Coaching
- 1978–1979: Houston Rockets (assistant)

Career highlights
- NBA All-Defensive First Team (1977); NBA All-Defensive Second Team (1978)

Career NBA statistics
- Points: 2,553 (7.2 ppg)
- Rebounds: 2,151 (6.0 rpg)
- Assists: 472 (1.3 apg)
- Stats at NBA.com
- Stats at Basketball Reference

E.C. Coleman Jr. (born September 25, 1950) is an American former professional basketball player. He played in the National Basketball Association (NBA) from 1973 to 1978 and was considered as one of the league's premier defensive forwards during his career. Coleman played college basketball for the Houston Baptist Huskies and was selected by the Houston Rockets in the 1973 NBA draft. He was chosen in the 1974 NBA expansion draft by the New Orleans Jazz where he gained prominence for his defensive abilities and was named to the NBA All-Defensive First Team in 1977. Coleman played for the Golden State Warriors during the 1977–78 season and earned a nomination to the All-Defensive Second Team. He finished his playing career with the Rockets in 1978.

== Early life ==
Coleman was raised in Flora, Mississippi. His father, E.C. Sr. (died 1998), was a United States Army veteran and worked as a roofer. Coleman was given his father's initials because his mother did not want to name him Efram III. He would labor 12 hours a day to help his parents who worked as sharecroppers until he was eligible for junior high school. Coleman was not interested in basketball until he met the head coach of the team at E. Flora High School, Gene Henderson, who encouraged him to play.

== College career ==
Coleman played college basketball for the Houston Baptist Huskies from 1969 to 1973. He led the team in rebounds all four seasons he played and led in scoring for three seasons. Coleman was a prolific scorer during his collegiate career; his 1,846 points are the second highest in program history. Coleman is the all-time program record holder in rebounds with 1,287. He was the first member of his family to graduate from high school and college.

Coleman was inducted into the Houston Baptist (now Houston Christian) Huskies Hall of Honor in 1997. The Huskies' most valuable player award is named after him.

== Professional career ==
Coleman was selected in the third round of the 1973 NBA draft by the Houston Rockets. He was selected by the New Orleans Jazz in the 1974 NBA expansion draft. Coleman was named to the NBA All-Defensive First Team in 1977.

On October 3, 1977, Coleman signed with the Golden State Warriors. He was selected to the All-Defensive Second Team in 1978. The Warriors attempted to trade Coleman but were unable to make a deal and waived him on November 2, 1978.

On November 9, 1978, Coleman signed with the Rockets to return for a second stint. His playing time was limited due to the Rockets having four other forwards on their roster. On December 24, Coleman was waived by the Rockets. On December 29, Coleman returned to the Rockets as an assistant coach with the responsibility of scouting colleges. He discovered Allen Leavell when he attended a game at Houston Baptist to receive an honor and Leavell was on the opposing team. Coleman was not retained for the 1979–80 season.

== Post-playing career ==
After his playing career ended, Coleman worked as a doorman for the Four Seasons Hotel. In a 1984 interview, he said, "I never felt I had to take any steps down after basketball because I hadn't taken that many steps up." Coleman was working as a limousine driver in 1986.

== Player profile ==
Coleman was regarded as one of the premier defensive forwards in the NBA during his career. He excelled against set players who were not prone to movement and was considered as being particularly adept at denying them the ball. The prohibiting of defensive hand-checking was considered to restrict his impact.

Rick Barry claimed "no other player in the league gives me as much trouble as E.C." George McGinnis admitted that he would not drive the baseline when he was being defended by Coleman. Rudy Tomjanovich said that Coleman was "by far the toughest defensive player that [he] had to go up against" during his Jazz and Warriors tenures. M. L. Carr chose Coleman as his "most difficult player to score against" and credited him as being "strong, quick and agile" with "a burning desire to make people have a bad game." Butch van Breda Kolff called Coleman "one of the more underrated players in our league."

== Personal life ==
Coleman's younger brother, Mack, was his teammate on the Houston Baptist Huskies and was selected by the Jazz in the 1975 NBA draft. Mack died in 1977. Another of Coleman's brothers also died in 1977 and his mother died in 1978; their deaths "destroyed his concentration."

Coleman has two children.

== Career statistics ==
Legend
GP	Games played	GS	Games started	MPG	Minutes per game
FG%	Field goal percentage	3P%	3-point field goal percentage	FT%	Free throw percentage
RPG	Rebounds per game	APG	Assists per game	SPG	Steals per game
BPG	Blocks per game	PPG	Points per game	**Bold**	Career high

=== NBA ===
==== Regular season ====
Year	Team	GP	MPG	FG%	FT%	RPG	APG	SPG	BPG	PPG
1973–74	Houston	58	18.5	.512	.635	4.3	1.3	.6	.3	5.2
1974–75	New Orleans	**77**	28.3	.445	.699	**7.1**	**1.4**	**1.1**	**.5**	8.1
1975–76	New Orleans	67	27.6	.451	.663	6.3	1.3	.8	.4	7.3
1976–77	New Orleans	**77**	**30.8**	.462	.732	**7.1**	1.3	.8	.4	**8.6**
1977–78	Golden State	72	25.0	.475	.727	5.2	1.4	.9	.3	6.4
1978–79	Houston	6	6.5	**.714**	**1.000**	1.2	.2	.3	.0	1.8
Career		357	26.1	.464	.694	6.0	1.3	.9	.4	7.2
