= Aaron James (basketball) =

American basketball player and coach (born 1952)

Personal information
- Born: October 5, 1952 (age 74) New Orleans, Louisiana, U.S.
- Listed height: 6 ft 8 in (2.03 m)
- Listed weight: 210 lb (95 kg)

Career information
- High school: Walter L. Cohen (New Orleans, Louisiana)
- College: Grambling State (1970–1974)
- NBA draft: 1974: 2nd round, 28th overall pick
- Drafted by: New Orleans Jazz
- Playing career: 1974–1980
- Position: Small forward
- Number: 23

Career history

Playing
- 1974–1979: New Orleans Jazz
- 1980: Antonini Siena
- 1980: U/Tex Wranglers

Coaching
- 1985: Manila Beer Brewmasters
- 1989–1995: Grambling State

Career NBA statistics
- Points: 3,829 (10.8 ppg)
- Rebounds: 1,470 (4.1 rpg)
- Assists: 370 (1.0 apg)
- Stats at NBA.com
- Stats at Basketball Reference

Aaron James (born October 5, 1952) is an American former professional basketball player. He spent his entire five-year National Basketball Association (NBA) career with the New Orleans Jazz.

James, a 6'8" small forward, averaged 10.8 points and 4.1 rebounds over 356 career games from 1974 to 1979 with the Jazz, who drafted him out of Grambling State University with the 10th pick of the second round of the 1974 NBA draft. He was the team's first ever selection.

He was also selected by the Utah Stars in the third round of the 1974 ABA Draft.

== Career statistics ==
Legend
GP	Games played	GS	Games started	MPG	Minutes per game
FG%	Field goal percentage	3P%	3-point field goal percentage	FT%	Free throw percentage
RPG	Rebounds per game	APG	Assists per game	SPG	Steals per game
BPG	Blocks per game	PPG	Points per game	**Bold**	Career high

=== NBA ===
==== Regular season ====
Year	Team	GP	MPG	FG%	FT%	RPG	APG	SPG	BPG	PPG
1974–75	New Orleans	76	22.8	.477	.778	4.8	.9	**.5**	.2	11.7
1975–76	New Orleans	75	17.9	.441	.750	3.3	.8	.4	.1	9.0
1976–77	New Orleans	52	20.4	.490	**.781**	3.6	1.1	.4	.1	10.9
1977–78	New Orleans	**80**	**26.5**	**.497**	.745	**5.3**	**1.4**	**.5**	**.3**	**12.2**
1978–79	New Orleans	73	19.4	.494	.750	3.4	1.1	.4	**.3**	10.0
Career		356	21.5	.481	.760	4.1	1.0	.4	.2	10.8
