= Ollie Johnson (basketball, born 1949) =

American basketball player

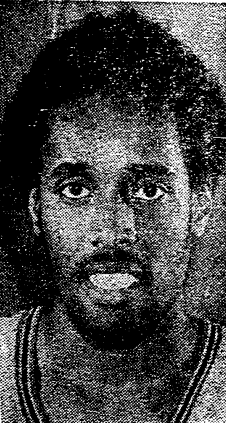

Personal information
- Born: May 11, 1949 (age 77) Philadelphia, Pennsylvania, U.S.
- Listed height: 6 ft 6 in (1.98 m)
- Listed weight: 200 lb (91 kg)

Career information
- High school: South Philadelphia (Philadelphia, Pennsylvania)
- College: Temple (1969–1972)
- NBA draft: 1972: 2nd round, 30th overall pick
- Drafted by: Portland Trail Blazers
- Playing career: 1972–1987
- Position: Small forward
- Number: 44, 35, 33, 27, 18

Career history
- 1972–1974: Portland Trail Blazers
- 1974–1975: New Orleans Jazz
- 1975–1977: Kansas City–Omaha / Kansas City Kings
- 1977–1978: Atlanta Hawks
- 1978–1980: Chicago Bulls
- 1980–1982: Philadelphia 76ers
- 1984–1985: Hobart Devils
- 1985–1986: Basket Groot Willebroek
- 1986–1987: West Sydney Westars

Career highlights
- MAC University–Eastern Player of the Year (1972); 2× First-team All-MAC University–Eastern (1971, 1972)

Career NBA statistics
- Points: 5,341 (7.7 ppg)
- Rebounds: 2,280 (3.3 rpg)
- Assists: 1,212 (1.8 apg)
- Stats at NBA.com
- Stats at Basketball Reference

Ollie Johnson (born May 11, 1949) is an American former professional basketball player.

A 6'6" forward from Temple University, Johnson played ten seasons (1972–1982) in the National Basketball Association as a member of the Portland Trail Blazers, New Orleans Jazz, Kansas City Kings, Atlanta Hawks, Chicago Bulls, and Philadelphia 76ers. He averaged 7.7 points per game in his NBA career.

He became director of athletics at the Community College of Philadelphia, retiring in 2011.

== Career statistics ==
Legend
GP	Games played	GS	Games started	MPG	Minutes per game
FG%	Field goal percentage	3P%	3-point field goal percentage	FT%	Free throw percentage
RPG	Rebounds per game	APG	Assists per game	SPG	Steals per game
BPG	Blocks per game	PPG	Points per game	**Bold**	Career high

=== NBA ===
==== Regular season ====
Year	Team	GP	GS	MPG	FG%	3P%	FT%	RPG	APG	SPG	BPG	PPG
1972–73	Portland	78		**27.4**	.497		.757	**5.3**	**2.6**			9.9
1973–74	Portland	79		21.7	.482		.819	4.1	2.1	.8	.4	6.3
1974–75	New Orleans	43		27.0	.465		.805	4.1	1.9	**1.0**	**.5**	7.9
1974–75	Kansas City–Omaha	30		16.9	.492		**.892**	2.2	1.0	.6	.4	5.4
1975–76	Kansas City	81		26.5	.513		.839	4.4	1.8	.8	**.5**	**10.1**
1976–77	Kansas City	81		17.1	.489		.878	2.6	1.3	.5	.3	6.6
1977–78	Atlanta	**82**		20.8	.472		.854	3.2	1.5	**1.0**	.4	8.5
1978–79	Chicago	71	**34**	24.4	.520		.800	3.2	2.3	.8	**.5**	9.2
1979–80	Chicago	79	1	19.4	.497	.091	.882	2.1	2.0	.7	.3	7.7
1980–81	Philadelphia	40	0	9.3	**.551**	.167	.871	1.4	.8	.5	.1	5.1
1981–82	Philadelphia	26	0	5.8	.500	**.333**	.857	.8	.4	.5	.1	2.3
Career		690	35	21.1	.496	.150	.827	3.3	1.8	.7	.4	7.7

==== Playoffs ====
Year	Team	GP	MPG	FG%	3P%	FT%	RPG	APG	SPG	BPG	PPG
1975	Kansas City–Omaha	6	**27.7**	**.464**		**1.000**	**3.8**	**1.0**	**1.2**	**.7**	**10.7**
1978	Atlanta	2	10.5	.364		–	1.5	**1.0**	.5	.5	4.0
1981	Philadelphia	**8**	2.8	.300	.000	–	.6	.3	.3	.1	.8
Career		16	13.1	.429	.000	1.000	1.9	.6	.6	.4	4.9
