= Jim McElroy =

American basketball player

Personal information
- Born: October 4, 1953 (age 73) Cotton Plant, Arkansas, U.S.
- Listed height: 6 ft 3 in (1.91 m)
- Listed weight: 190 lb (86 kg)

Career information
- High school: Murray–Wright (Detroit, Michigan)
- College: Monroe County CC (1971–1973); Central Michigan (1973–1975)
- NBA draft: 1975: 3rd round, 38th overall pick
- Drafted by: New Orleans Jazz
- Playing career: 1975–1982
- Position: Shooting guard
- Number: 33

Career history
- 1975–1979: New Orleans Jazz
- 1979–1980: Detroit Pistons
- 1980–1982: Atlanta Hawks

Career highlights
- First-team All-MAC (1975); Second-team All-MAC (1974); No. 14 retired by Central Michigan Chippewas

Career NBA statistics
- Points: 4,120 (9.9 ppg)
- Rebounds: 820 (2.0 rpg)
- Assists: 1,462 (3.5 pg)
- Stats at NBA.com
- Stats at Basketball Reference

James Charles McElroy Jr. (born October 4, 1953) is an American former professional basketball player. He was born in Cotton Plant, Arkansas.

A 6'3" guard from Central Michigan University, McElroy played in the National Basketball Association from 1975 to 1982 as a member of the New Orleans Jazz, Detroit Pistons, and Atlanta Hawks. He averaged 9.9 points and 3.5 assists in his career and ranked tenth overall in total assists (453) during the 1978–79 NBA season.

== Career statistics ==
Legend
GP	Games played	GS	Games started	MPG	Minutes per game
FG%	Field goal percentage	3P%	3-point field goal percentage	FT%	Free throw percentage
RPG	Rebounds per game	APG	Assists per game	SPG	Steals per game
BPG	Blocks per game	PPG	Points per game	**Bold**	Career high

=== NBA ===
==== Regular season ====
Year	Team	GP	GS	MPG	FG%	3P%	FT%	RPG	APG	SPG	BPG	PPG
1975–76	New Orleans	51		22.2	**.510**		.736	2.2	2.1	.9	.1	7.5
1976–77	New Orleans	73		27.8	.470		.779	2.5	3.6	.8	.1	10.6
1977–78	New Orleans	74		23.8	.473		.737	2.0	3.9	.8	.5	9.4
1978–79	New Orleans	**79**		**34.2**	.491		.762	**2.7**	**5.7**	**1.9**	**.6**	**16.9**
1979–80	Detroit	36		28.1	.455	.214	.798	1.4	4.5	.7	.4	11.7
1979–80	Atlanta	31		16.6	.386	**.286**	.698	1.6	2.1	.7	.2	5.5
1980–81	Atlanta	54		12.6	.386	.125	**.814**	.9	1.6	.4	.2	3.8
1981–82	Atlanta	20	17	17.5	.416	.200	.816	.9	2.0	.4	.2	6.7
Career		418	17	24.3	.468	.206	.764	2.0	3.5	.9	.3	9.9

==== Playoffs ====
Year	Team	GP	MPG	FG%	3P%	FT%	RPG	APG	SPG	BPG	PPG
1980	Atlanta	5	6.4	.444	.000	.800	.4	.8	.0	.0	2.4
