= Andy Walker (basketball) =

American basketball player

Personal information
- Born: March 25, 1955 (age 71) Long Island City, New York, U.S.
- Listed height: 6 ft 4 in (1.93 m)
- Listed weight: 190 lb (86 kg)

Career information
- High school: Long Island City (Queens, New York)
- College: Niagara (1972–1976)
- NBA draft: 1976: 7th round, 111th overall pick
- Drafted by: New Orleans Jazz
- Position: Small forward
- Number: 42

Career history

Playing
- 1976–1977: New Orleans Jazz

Coaching
- 1985–1989: Niagara
- Stats at NBA.com
- Stats at Basketball Reference

Andrew Martin Walker (born March 25, 1955) is an American former professional basketball player who spent one season in the National Basketball Association (NBA) as a member of the New Orleans Jazz (1976–77). A small forward born in Long Island City, New York, Walker attended Niagara University and was drafted by the Jazz in the seventh round of the 1976 NBA draft.

== Career statistics ==
Legend
GP	Games played	GS	Games started	MPG	Minutes per game
FG%	Field goal percentage	3P%	3-point field goal percentage	FT%	Free throw percentage
RPG	Rebounds per game	APG	Assists per game	SPG	Steals per game
BPG	Blocks per game	PPG	Points per game	**Bold**	Career high

=== NBA ===
==== Regular season ====
Year	Team	GP	MPG	FG%	FT%	RPG	APG	SPG	BPG	PPG
1976–77	New Orleans	40	11.0	.462	.766	1.9	.8	.5	.2	4.5
