= Mo Howard (basketball) =

American basketball player (born 1954)

Personal information
- Born: August 25, 1954 (age 71) Philadelphia, Pennsylvania, U.S.
- Listed height: 6 ft 2 in (1.88 m)
- Listed weight: 170 lb (77 kg)

Career information
- High school: Saint Joseph's Preparatory School (Philadelphia, Pennsylvania)
- College: Maryland (1972–1976)
- NBA draft: 1976: 2nd round, 32nd overall pick
- Drafted by: Cleveland Cavaliers
- Position: shooting guard
- Number: 2, 14

Career history
- 1976: Cleveland Cavaliers
- 1977: New Orleans Jazz

Career highlights
- Second-team Parade All-American (1972)
- Stats at NBA.com
- Stats at Basketball Reference

Maurice Howard (born August 25, 1954) is an American former professional basketball player. He played college basketball for the Maryland Terrapins and played for the Cleveland Cavaliers during the 1976–77 Cavaliers season. After nine games with the Cavaliers, he played in 23 games for the New Orleans Jazz during the 1976–77 Jazz season. In 32 games, he averaged 10.8 minutes and 4.8 points per game.

== Personal ==
Howard and Diane Coleman are the parents of basketball coach Ashley Howard.

== Career statistics ==
Legend
| GP | Games played | GS | Games started | MPG | Minutes per game |
| FG% | Field goal percentage | 3P% | 3-point field goal percentage | FT% | Free throw percentage |
| RPG | Rebounds per game | APG | Assists per game | SPG | Steals per game |
| BPG | Blocks per game | PPG | Points per game | **Bold** | Career high |

=== NBA ===
==== Regular season ====
| Year | Team | GP | GS | MPG | FG% | FT% | RPG | APG | SPG | BPG | PPG |
|---|---|---|---|---|---|---|---|---|---|---|---|
| 1976–77 | Cleveland | 9 | 0 | 3.1 | **.533** | **.833** | .6 | .6 | .1 | .2 | 2.3 |
| 1976–77 | New Orleans | **23** | | **13.8** | .479 | .655 | **1.5** | **1.6** | **.7** | **.3** | **5.7** |
| Career | | 32 | 0 | 10.8 | .485 | .686 | 1.2 | 1.3 | .5 | .3 | 4.8 |
