= 1974–75 New Orleans Jazz season =

NBA professional basketball team season

- Head coach: Scotty Robertson, Elgin Baylor, Butch van Breda Kolff
- Arena: Loyola Field House; Municipal Auditorium

Results
- Record: 23–59 (.280)
- Place: Division: 5th (Central); Conference: 9th (Eastern)
- Playoff finish: Did not qualify
- Stats at Basketball Reference

Local media
- Television: WGNO
- Radio: WWL

The 1974–75 New Orleans Jazz season was the first season of the franchise in the NBA. The Jazz became an expansion NBA franchise in 1974. Their first head coach was Scotty Robertson, but he was fired after a 1–14 start; he was replaced by Butch van Breda Kolff for the rest of the season, except for one game in between where Elgin Baylor served as the interim head coach.

The team averaged 101.5 points per game (ranked 10th in NBA) while allowing an average of 109.3 points per game (ranked 18th in NBA).

== Offseason ==
=== Draft ===
Round	Pick	Player	Position	Nationality	College
2	28	Aaron James	PF	United States	Grambling State
3	46	Bruce King		United States	University of Texas-Pan American
4	64	Ray Price		United States	University of Washington
5	82	Ed Searcy	SF	United States	St. John's
6	100	Lawrence McCray		United States	Florida State University
7	118	Joel Copeland		United States	Old Dominion University
8	136	Jay Piccola		United States	Roanoke College
9	154	Ken Boyd	F	United States	Boston University
10	171	Walt McGary		United States	University of Tennessee at Chattanooga

== Roster ==
1974–75 New Orleans Jazz roster
Players

Pos.	No.	Player	Height	Weight	DOB	From
G	17	Henry Bibby	6 ft 1 in (1.85 m)	185 lb (84 kg)	1949-11-24	UCLA
F	33	Ken Boyd	6 ft 5 in (1.96 m)	195 lb (88 kg)	1952-03-25	Boston University
F	12	E. C. Coleman	6 ft 8 in (2.03 m)	225 lb (102 kg)	1950-09-25	Houston Baptist
F/C	31	Mel Counts	7 ft 0 in (2.13 m)	230 lb (104 kg)	1941-10-16	Oregon State
G	25	Bernie Fryer	6 ft 3 in (1.91 m)	185 lb (84 kg)	1949-12-25	BYU
F	23	Aaron James	6 ft 8 in (2.03 m)	210 lb (95 kg)	1952-10-05	Grambling State
G	44	Pete Maravich	6 ft 5 in (1.96 m)	197 lb (89 kg)	1947-06-22	LSU
F/C	34	Otto Moore	6 ft 11 in (2.11 m)	205 lb (93 kg)	1946-08-27	Texas–Pan American
G	14	Louie Nelson	6 ft 3 in (1.91 m)	190 lb (86 kg)	1951-05-28	Washington
F/C	30	Rick Roberson	6 ft 9 in (2.06 m)	231 lb (105 kg)	1947-07-07	Cincinnati
G/F	15	Bud Stallworth	6 ft 5 in (1.96 m)	180 lb (82 kg)	1950-01-18	Kansas
G/F	22	Nate Williams	6 ft 5 in (1.96 m)	215 lb (98 kg)	1950-05-02	Utah State

Coaches
Head coach
- Butch van Breda Kolff
Assistant(s)
- Elgin Baylor
- Sam Jones

Legend
- (DP) Unsigned draft pick
- (FA) Free agent
- (S) Suspended
- Injured

== Regular season ==
=== Season standings ===
Central Division	W	L	PCT	GB	Home	Road	Div
y-Washington Bullets	60	22	.732	–	36–5	24–17	22–8
x-Houston Rockets	41	41	.500	19	29–12	12–29	16–14
Cleveland Cavaliers	40	42	.488	20	29–12	11–30	17–13
Atlanta Hawks	31	51	.378	29	22–19	9–32	11–19
New Orleans Jazz	23	59	.280	37	20–21	3–38	9–21

#	Eastern Conference				
#	Team	W	L	PCT	GB
1	z-Boston Celtics	60	22	.732	–
2	y-Washington Bullets	60	22	.732	–
3	x-Buffalo Braves	49	33	.598	11
4	x-Houston Rockets	41	41	.500	19
5	x-New York Knicks	40	42	.488	20
6	Cleveland Cavaliers	40	42	.488	20
7	Philadelphia 76ers	34	48	.415	26
8	Atlanta Hawks	31	51	.378	29
9	New Orleans Jazz	23	59	.280	37

=== Game log ===
1974–75 game log
Total: 23–59 (Home: 20–21; Road: 3–38)
October: 0–7 (home: 0–3; road: 0–4)

Game	Date	Team	Score	High points	High rebounds	High assists	Location Attendance	Record
1	October 17	@ New York	L 74–89	Pete Maravich (15)	E. C. Coleman (10)	Pete Maravich (4)	Madison Square Garden; 15,883	0–1
2	October 18	@ Philadelphia	L 99–112	Bud Stallworth (24)	Toby Kimball (14)	Pete Maravich (7)	The Spectrum; 8,939	0–2
3	October 19	@ Washington	L 92–110	Bud Stallworth (19)	Lamar Green (16)	Jim Barnett (4)	Capital Centre; 10,896	0–3
4	October 22	@ Buffalo	L 118–134	Ollie Johnson (20)	Bud Stallworth (9)	Pete Maravich (9)	Buffalo Memorial Auditorium; 8,251	0–4
5	October 24	Philadelphia	L 89–102	Jim Barnett (25)	Lamar Green (18)	Pete Maravich (7)	Municipal Auditorium; 6,459	0–5
6	October 26	Cleveland	L 88–90	Jim Barnett (30)	Lamar Green (16)	Louie Nelson (6)	Municipal Auditorium; 3,450	0–6
7	October 30	Houston	L 100–113	Jim Barnett (28)	Lamar Green (9)	Pete Maravich (8)	Municipal Auditorium; 3,450	0–7

November : 2–13 (home: 2–6; road: 0–7)

Game	Date	Team	Score	High points	High rebounds	High assists	Location Attendance	Record
8	November 1	@ Detroit	L 93–103	Jim Barnett (17)	Neal Walk (19)	Ollie Johnson (4)	Cobo Arena; 4,237	0–8
9	November 5	@ Kansas City–Omaha	L 97–115	Pete Maravich (26)	Neal Walk (22)	Pete Maravich (5)	Omaha Civic Auditorium; 3,588	0–9
10	November 6	Buffalo	L 98–110	Aaron James (21)	Aaron James (16)	Green, Maravich (3)	Municipal Auditorium; 3,302	0–10
11	November 8	Phoenix	L 102–105	Pete Maravich (29)	Aaron James (11)	Pete Maravich (8)	Municipal Auditorium; 3,118	0–11
12	November 10	Portland	W 102–101	Pete Maravich (30)	Pete Maravich (11)	Pete Maravich (12)	Municipal Auditorium; 5,465	1–11
13	November 12	Chicago	L 79–88	Pete Maravich (27)	Neal Walk (12)	Pete Maravich (9)	Municipal Auditorium; 4,412	1–12
14	November 15	Washington	L 95–104	Pete Maravich (20)	E. C. Coleman (13)	Pete Maravich (7)	Municipal Auditorium; 5,275	1–13
15	November 16	@ Atlanta	L 104–130	Pete Maravich (32)	Neal Walk (8)	Jim Barnett (5)	Omni Coliseum; 8,249	1–14
16	November 17	Detroit	L 85–99	Pete Maravich (24)	Neal Walk (12)	Pete Maravich (8)	Municipal Auditorium; 3,441	1–15
17	November 20	Seattle	L 95–99	Jim Barnett (18)	E. C. Coleman (12)	Pete Maravich (9)	Municipal Auditorium; 4,318	1–16
18	November 22	Atlanta	W 90–86	Pete Maravich (21)	Aaron James (14)	Rick Adelman (6)	LSU Assembly Center; 7,417	2–16
19	November 23	@ Cleveland	L 100–121	Barnett, Nelson (18)	E. C. Coleman (11)	Barnett, Counts, Walk (4)	Richfield Coliseum; 8,864	2–17
20	November 26	@ Phoenix	L 110–120	Pete Maravich (20)	Rick Roberson (5)	Pete Maravich (8)	Arizona Veterans Memorial Coliseum; 4,931	2–18
21	November 29	@ Los Angeles	L 122–127	Lantz, Maravich (22)	E. C. Coleman (11)	Pete Maravich (9)	The Forum; 11,224	2–19
22	November 30	@ Portland	L 85–117	Aaron James (18)	Roberson, Walk (9)	Rick Adelman (5)	Memorial Coliseum; 11,896	2–20

December : 1–10 (home: 1–1; road: 0–9)

Game	Date	Team	Score	High points	High rebounds	High assists	Location Attendance	Record
23	December 3	@ Golden State	L 101–122	Pete Maravich (22)	Neal Walk (12)	Pete Maravich (8)	Oakland-Alameda County Coliseum Arena; 5,081	2–21
24	December 6	@ Seattle	L 108–121	Aaron James (22)	Mel Counts (12)	Mel Counts (9)	Seattle Center Coliseum; 14,082	2–22
25	December 8	Boston	L 101–111	Jim Barnett (29)	Bud Stallworth (9)	Barnett, Nelson (3)	Municipal Auditorium; 7,042	2–23
26	December 11	Golden State	W 106–103	Barnett, James (20)	Coleman, Roberson (12)	Jim Barnett (11)	Municipal Auditorium; 3,731	3–23
27	December 13	@ Chicago	L 76–109	Nelson, Walk (13)	Neal Walk (13)	Adelman, Nelson (3)	Chicago Stadium; 5,198	3–24
28	December 17	@ Houston	L 83–109	Ollie Johnson (14)	Rick Roberson (11)	Pete Maravich (5)	Hofheinz Pavilion; 3,333	3–25
29	December 18	@ Washington	L 90–113	Jim Barnett (16)	Rick Roberson (12)	Jim Barnett (6)	Capital Centre; 4,227	3–26
30	December 20	@ Boston	L 106–110	Louie Nelson (21)	E. C. Coleman (10)	Neal Walk (6)	Springfield Civic Center; 6,883	3–27
31	December 22	@ Milwaukee	L 76–96	E. C. Coleman (14)	Mel Counts (9)	Louie Nelson (3)	MECCA Arena; 9,038	3–28
32	December 23	@ Cleveland	L 79–95	Pete Maravich (24)	Maravich, Roberson (10)	Maravich, Nelson (4)	Richfield Coliseum; 7,867	3–29
33	December 28	@ New York	L 94–101	E. C. Coleman (23)	Rick Roberson (12)	Pete Maravich (4)	Madison Square Garden; 18,555	3–30

January : 2–12 (home: 2–5; road: 0–7)

Game	Date	Team	Score	High points	High rebounds	High assists	Location Attendance	Record
34	January 2	@ Detroit	L 95–99	Pete Maravich (31)	E. C. Coleman (10)	Pete Maravich (6)	Cobo Arena; 5,176	3–31
35	January 4	@ Seattle	L 89–111	Neal Walk (20)	Neal Walk (14)	Louie Nelson (6)	Seattle Center Coliseum; 13,474	3–32
36	January 5	@ Portland	L 102–111	E. C. Coleman (21)	E. C. Coleman (8)	E. C. Coleman (5)	Memorial Coliseum; 8,968	3–33
37	January 7	@ Golden State	L 94–136	Coleman, James (18)	Mel Counts (10)	Barnett, Nelson (4)	Oakland-Alameda County Coliseum Arena; 4,164	3–34
38	January 10	Houston	W 111–108	Pete Maravich (38)	Pete Maravich (11)	Pete Maravich (8)	Loyola Field House; 2,368	4–34
39	January 17	Seattle	W 113–109	Pete Maravich (16)	Mel Counts (13)	Pete Maravich (17)	Loyola Field House; 3,120	5–34
40	January 19	Buffalo	L 112–117	Pete Maravich (40)	Pete Maravich (14)	Pete Maravich (13)	Loyola Field House; 4,214	5–35
41	January 21	@ Atlanta	L 103–135	Pete Maravich (26)	Neal Walk (8)	Pete Maravich (8)	Omni Coliseum; 3,508	5–36
42	January 22	Boston	L 102–110	Pete Maravich (34)	Neal Walk (10)	Pete Maravich (11)	Loyola Field House; 5,723	5–37
43	January 24	@ Los Angeles	L 108–110	Louie Nelson (28)	Mel Counts (14)	Jim Barnett (6)	The Forum; 10,880	5–38
44	January 25	@ Phoenix	L 90–94 (OT)	Louie Nelson (23)	Mel Counts (12)	Pete Maravich (7)	Arizona Veterans Memorial Coliseum; 5,872	5–39
45	January 27	Milwaukee	L 115–117	Pete Maravich (36)	Maravich, Moore (8)	Pete Maravich (8)	Loyola Field House; 6,419	5–40
46	January 29	Los Angeles	L 108–112	Pete Maravich (32)	Otto Moore (13)	Pete Maravich (7)	Loyola Field House; 2,887	5–41
47	January 31	Washington	L 101–106	Louie Nelson (24)	E. C. Coleman (16)	Pete Maravich (8)	Loyola Field House; 2,812	5–42

February : 10–5 (home: 8–2; road: 2–3)

Game	Date	Team	Score	High points	High rebounds	High assists	Location Attendance	Record
48	February 2	New York	W 118–114	Pete Maravich (33)	E. C. Coleman (9)	Pete Maravich (12)	Loyola Field House; 6,419	6–42
49	February 5	Houston	L 97–124	Louie Nelson (18)	Coleman, Moore, Stallworth (5)	Pete Maravich (7)	Loyola Field House; 3,063	6–43
50	February 7	@ Milwaukee	L 98–119	Pete Maravich (27)	Mel Counts (8)	Mel Counts (6)	MECCA Arena; 10,938	6–44
51	February 8	@ Atlanta	W 106–102	Pete Maravich (47)	Otto Moore (11)	Maravich, Nelson (5)	Omni Coliseum; 13,653	7–44
52	February 10	Atlanta	W 96–89	Louie Nelson (29)	Otto Moore (12)	Pete Maravich (8)	Loyola Field House; 4,693	8–44
53	February 11	@ Cleveland	L 86–100	Pete Maravich (18)	Mel Counts (9)	Mel Counts (6)	Richfield Coliseum; 3,788	8–45
54	February 14	@ Houston	W 124–112	Louie Nelson (23)	E. C. Coleman (11)	Pete Maravich (8)	Hofheinz Pavilion; 3,342	9–45
55	February 16	Milwaukee	W 103–101	Louie Nelson (27)	Pete Maravich (9)	Pete Maravich (8)	Municipal Auditorium; 7,435	10–45
56	February 18	Philadelphia	W 103–85	Pete Maravich (33)	E. C. Coleman (9)	Pete Maravich (11)	Municipal Auditorium; 5,048	11–45
57	February 20	Portland	W 114–102	Pete Maravich (32)	Otto Moore (8)	Pete Maravich (9)	Loyola Field House; 4,918	12–45
58	February 21	Phoenix	W 98–96	Pete Maravich (22)	Coleman, Moore (12)	Pete Maravich (6)	Loyola Field House; 4,563	13–45
59	February 23	Houston	W 108–99	Pete Maravich (38)	E. C. Coleman (10)	Pete Maravich (11)	Loyola Field House; 6,425	14–45
60	February 25	Chicago	L 105–120	Nate Williams (20)	Otto Moore (8)	Pete Maravich (7)	Municipal Auditorium; 7,024	14–46
61	February 27	@ Buffalo	L 100–110	Pete Maravich (24)	E. C. Coleman (13)	Bibby, Counts, Maravich (5)	Maple Leaf Gardens; 5,578	14–47
62	February 28	Kansas City–Omaha	W 114–107 (OT)	Pete Maravich (34)	Otto Moore (11)	Henry Bibby (7)	Municipal Auditorium; 5,370	15–47

March : 8–9 (home: 7–3; road: 1–6)

Game	Date	Team	Score	High points	High rebounds	High assists	Location Attendance	Record
63	March 1	@ Houston	L 109–121	Aaron James (21)	Mel Counts (15)	Pete Maravich (7)	Hofheinz Pavilion; 6,358	15–48
64	March 5	Los Angeles	W 123–117	Pete Maravich (30)	Pete Maravich (14)	Pete Maravich (13)	Municipal Auditorium; 6,554	16–48
65	March 7	Golden State	W 110–107	Pete Maravich (34)	Pete Maravich (11)	Henry Bibby (8)	Municipal Auditorium; 6,218	17–48
66	March 8	@ Atlanta	L 101–113	Aaron James (19)	Otto Moore (11)	Pete Maravich (8)	Omni Coliseum; 6,131	17–49
67	March 9	Cleveland	W 90–86	Pete Maravich (26)	Otto Moore (11)	Pete Maravich (8)	Municipal Auditorium; 5,031	18–49
68	March 11	@ Cleveland	L 114–123	Pete Maravich (23)	Aaron James (10)	Pete Maravich (5)	Richfield Coliseum; 5,369	18–50
69	March 15	Atlanta	W 140–123	Pete Maravich (24)	Otto Moore (13)	Nate Williams (6)	Loyola Field House; 3,623	19–50
70	March 16	Cleveland	L 111–113	Aaron James (24)	Pete Maravich (12)	Bibby, Fryer, Maravich (4)	Loyola Field House; 3,824	19–51
71	March 19	@ Philadelphia	W 126–115	Pete Maravich (36)	Otto Moore (10)	Pete Maravich (7)	The Spectrum; 6,411	20–51
72	March 20	@ Kansas City–Omaha	L 95–101	Pete Maravich (24)	E. C. Coleman (9)	Nate Williams (7)	Kemper Arena; 6,138	20–52
73	March 21	Washington	L 109–122	Louie Nelson (26)	Otto Moore (14)	Pete Maravich (9)	Municipal Auditorium; 6,273	20–53
74	March 23	Detroit	L 114–125	Nate Williams (28)	Pete Maravich (10)	Henry Bibby (9)	Municipal Auditorium; 4,182	20–54
75	March 25	Kansas City–Omaha	W 112–110	Pete Maravich (36)	Otto Moore (10)	Pete Maravich (10)	Municipal Auditorium; 3,388	21–54
76	March 26	@ Boston	L 100–113	Aaron James (20)	Otto Moore (16)	Bibby, Fryer (4)	Boston Garden; 15,320	21–55
77	March 28	New York	W 111–102	Pete Maravich (32)	E. C. Coleman (17)	Bibby, Nelson (4)	Municipal Auditorium; 8,002	22–55
78	March 29	@ Houston	L 105–107	Bernie Fryer (17)	Mel Counts (12)	Bernie Fryer (7)	Hofheinz Pavilion; 7,328	22–56
79	March 30	Atlanta	W 108–105	Nate Williams (18)	Otto Moore (11)	Pete Maravich (8)	Municipal Auditorium; 5,422	23–56

April : 0–3 (home: 0–1; road: 0–2)

Game	Date	Team	Score	High points	High rebounds	High assists	Location Attendance	Record
80	April 1	Washington	L 101–110	Pete Maravich (19)	Pete Maravich (13)	Pete Maravich (11)	Municipal Auditorium; 7,312	23–57
81	April 4	@ Chicago	L 87–111	Pete Maravich (31)	Mel Counts (9)	Counts, James, Maravich, Moore, Nelson (1)	Chicago Stadium; 11,312	23–58
82	April 6	@ Washington	L 103–119	Aaron James (34)	E. C. Coleman (13)	Mel Counts (11)	Capital Centre; 13,267	23–59

1974–75 schedule

== Playoffs ==
The Jazz missed the playoffs for the first inaugural season.

== Player stats ==
Legend
GP	Games played	GS	Games started	MPG	Minutes per game
FG%	Field-goal percentage	3P%	3-point field-goal percentage	FT%	Free-throw percentage
RPG	Rebounds per game	APG	Assists per game	SPG	Steals per game
BPG	Blocks per game	PPG	Points per game

Player	GP	MPG	FG%	FT%	RPG	APG	SPG	BPG	PPG
Rick Adelman	28	21.89	.421	.695	1.96	2.46	1.68	0.21	6.25
Jim Barnett	45	27.51	.448	.830	2.84	3.04	0.78	0.36	13.02
Walt Bellamy	1	14.00	1.000	1.000	5.00	0.00	0.00	0.00	6.00
Henry Bibby	28	18.71	.416	.731	1.79	2.71	0.89	0.00	8.93
John Block	4	14.25	.310	.900	4.50	1.75	1.00	0.25	6.75
Ken Boyd	6	4.17	.538	.455	0.83	0.33	0.50	0.00	3.17
E.C. Coleman	77	28.26	.445	.699	7.13	1.36	1.06	0.48	8.08
Mel Counts	75	18.95	.438	.761	5.88	2.43	0.65	0.57	6.93
Bernie Fryer	31	13.94	.443	.767	1.48	1.68	0.71	0.00	4.10
Lamar Green	15	18.67	.343	.450	7.27	1.07	0.27	0.33	3.80
Aaron James	76	22.78	.477	.778	4.82	0.87	0.54	0.20	11.67
Ollie Johnson	43	26.95	.465	.805	4.12	1.86	0.98	0.47	7.91
Toby Kimball	3	30.00	.304	.857	8.67	1.33	0.67	0.00	6.67
Stu Lantz	19	18.58	.339	.887	1.26	1.58	0.63	0.11	6.58
Russ Lee	15	9.27	.382	.500	2.07	0.47	0.73	0.20	4.33
Pete Maravich	79	36.11	.419	.811	5.34	6.18	1.52	0.23	21.52
Otto Moore	40	26.38	.453	.672	8.20	2.05	0.53	0.98	6.98
Louie Nelson	72	26.36	.452	.768	2.72	2.47	0.90	0.08	11.19
Rick Roberson	16	21.19	.444	.575	7.38	1.44	0.44	0.50	7.44
Bud Stallworth	73	22.85	.420	.687	3.37	0.63	0.81	0.15	9.88
Neal Walk	37	23.00	.420	.800	7.08	2.73	0.81	0.54	9.89
Nate Williams	35	23.26	.517	.824	4.51	1.91	1.26	0.17	14.34

Source: Basketball-Reference.com
