= Bud Stallworth =

American basketball player (born 1950)

Personal information
- Born: January 18, 1950 (age 76) Hartselle, Alabama, U.S.
- Listed height: 6 ft 5 in (1.96 m)
- Listed weight: 190 lb (86 kg)

Career information
- High school: Morgan County Training School (Hartselle, Alabama)
- College: Kansas (1969–1972)
- NBA draft: 1972: 1st round, 7th overall pick
- Drafted by: Seattle SuperSonics
- Playing career: 1972–1977
- Position: Small forward / shooting guard
- Number: 15

Career history
- 1972–1974: Seattle SuperSonics
- 1974–1977: New Orleans Jazz

Career highlights
- Consensus second-team All-American (1972); Big Eight Player of the Year (1972); 2× First-team All-Big Eight (1971, 1972); No. 15 jersey retired by Kansas Jayhawks

Career statistics
- Points: 2,403 (7.7 ppg)
- Rebounds: 861 (2.8 rpg)
- Assists: 213 (0.7 apg)
- Stats at NBA.com
- Stats at Basketball Reference

Isaac "Bud" Stallworth (born January 18, 1950) is an American former basketball player. He was a 6-foot-5-inch (1.96 m) and 190-pound (86 kg) shooting guard and played college basketball for the Kansas Jayhawks, earning consensus second-team All-American and Big Eight Conference Player of the Year honors in 1972. He had a professional career in the National Basketball Association (NBA) from 1972 to 1977.

Stallworth was selected seventh overall by the Seattle SuperSonics in the 1972 NBA draft, and by the Denver Rockets in the 1972 American Basketball Association (ABA) draft. After two seasons with the Sonics, he was made available in the 1974 expansion draft to be selected by the New Orleans Jazz, for whom he played for three seasons. His playing career was cut short due to a back injury sustained in an automobile accident in 1977. In 1972 while at KU, Stallworth scored 50 points in a win against Missouri.

In 1978, Stallworth graduated from KU with a bachelor of social work degree.

== Career statistics ==
Legend
GP	Games played	GS	Games started	MPG	Minutes per game
FG%	Field goal percentage	3P%	3-point field goal percentage	FT%	Free throw percentage
RPG	Rebounds per game	APG	Assists per game	SPG	Steals per game
BPG	Blocks per game	PPG	Points per game	**Bold**	Career high

=== NBA ===
==== Regular season ====
Year	Team	GP	MPG	FG%	FT%	RPG	APG	SPG	BPG	PPG
1972–73	Seattle	**77**	15.9	.379	**.754**	2.9	.8			6.3
1973–74	Seattle	67	15.2	.392	.623	2.6	.5	.3	.2	6.3
1974–75	New Orleans	73	**22.8**	.420	.687	**3.4**	.6	**.8**	.2	**9.9**
1975–76	New Orleans	56	18.8	.437	.685	2.6	**.9**	.5	**.3**	9.1
1976–77	New Orleans	40	13.2	**.463**	.586	1.8	.6	.5	**.3**	6.7
Career		313	17.5	.414	.686	2.8	.7	.5	.2	7.7
