= 1975–76 New Orleans Jazz season =

NBA professional basketball team season

- Head coach: Butch Van Breda Kolff
- Arena: Louisiana Superdome

Results
- Record: 38–44 (.463)
- Place: Division: 4th (Central); Conference: 8th (Eastern)
- Playoff finish: Did not qualify
- Stats at Basketball Reference

The 1975–76 New Orleans Jazz season was the team's second in the NBA. They began the season hoping to improve upon their 23–59 output from the previous season. They bested it by fifteen wins, finishing 38–44, but failed to qualify for the playoffs for the second straight season.

== Roster ==
1975–76 New Orleans Jazz roster
Players

Pos.	No.	Player	Height	Weight	DOB	From
F	11	Ron Behagen	6 ft 9 in (2.06 m)	185 lb (84 kg)		Minnesota
G	45	Henry Bibby	6 ft 1 in (1.85 m)	185 lb (84 kg)		UCLA
G	4	Freddie Boyd	6 ft 2 in (1.88 m)	180 lb (82 kg)		Oregon State
F	12	E. C. Coleman	6 ft 8 in (2.03 m)	225 lb (102 kg)		Houston Baptist
F	23	Aaron James	6 ft 8 in (2.03 m)	210 lb (95 kg)		Grambling State
C	53	Rich Kelley	7 ft 0 in (2.13 m)	235 lb (107 kg)		Stanford
G	7	Pete Maravich	6 ft 5 in (1.96 m)	197 lb (89 kg)		LSU
G	33	Jim McElroy	6 ft 3 in (1.91 m)	190 lb (86 kg)		Central Michigan
C	34	Otto Moore	6 ft 11 in (2.11 m)	205 lb (93 kg)		Texas–Pan American
F	15	Bud Stallworth	6 ft 5 in (1.96 m)	190 lb (86 kg)		Kansas
G/F	22	Nate Williams	6 ft 5 in (1.96 m)	215 lb (98 kg)		Utah State

Coaches
Head coach
- (United States) Butch van Breda Kolff

Legend
- (DP) Unsigned draft pick
- (FA) Free agent
- (S) Suspended
- Injured

== Regular season ==
=== Season standings ===
Central Division	W	L	PCT	GB	Home	Road	Div
y-Cleveland Cavaliers	49	33	.598	–	29–12	20–21	15–11
x-Washington Bullets	48	34	.585	1	31–10	17–24	14–12
Houston Rockets	40	42	.488	9	27–13	13–29	14–12
New Orleans Jazz	38	44	.463	11	22–19	16–25	15–11
Atlanta Hawks	29	53	.354	20	20–21	9–32	7–19

#	Eastern Conference				
#	Team	W	L	PCT	GB
1	z-Boston Celtics	54	28	.659	–
2	y-Cleveland Cavaliers	49	33	.598	5
3	x-Washington Bullets	48	34	.585	6
4	x-Philadelphia 76ers	46	36	.561	8
5	x-Buffalo Braves	46	36	.561	8
6	Houston Rockets	40	42	.488	14
7	New York Knicks	38	44	.463	16
8	New Orleans Jazz	38	44	.463	16
9	Atlanta Hawks	29	53	.354	25

z – clinched division title
y – clinched division title
x – clinched playoff spot

== Awards and records ==
- Pete Maravich, All-NBA First Team
