= 1974–75 Atlanta Hawks season =

Season of National Basketball Association team the Atlanta Hawks

- Head coach: Cotton Fitzsimmons
- Arena: Omni Coliseum

Results
- Record: 31–51 (.378)
- Place: Division: 4th (Central); Conference: 8th (Eastern)
- Playoff finish: Did not qualify
- Stats at Basketball Reference

Local media
- Television: WTCG
- Radio: WSB

The 1974–75 Atlanta Hawks season was the Hawks' 26th season in the NBA and seventh season in Atlanta.

An unusually high total of eight Hawk players averaged double figures in points per game for the season, though Lou Hudson only played in eleven games.

== Roster ==
Atlanta Hawks roster
Players

Pos.	No.	Player	Height	Weight	DOB	From
F	50	John Brown	6 ft 7 in (2.01 m)	220 lb (100 kg)		Missouri
G	22	John Drew	6 ft 6 in (1.98 m)	205 lb (93 kg)		Gardner–Webb
G	14	Tom Henderson	6 ft 3 in (1.91 m)	190 lb (86 kg)		Hawaiʻi
F	44	Bob Kauffman	6 ft 8 in (2.03 m)	240 lb (109 kg)		Guilford
G/F	23	Lou Hudson	6 ft 5 in (1.96 m)	210 lb (95 kg)		Minnesota
C	13	Dwight Jones	6 ft 10 in (2.08 m)	210 lb (95 kg)		Houston
G	7	Dean Meminger	6 ft 0 in (1.83 m)	175 lb (79 kg)		Marquette
C	40	Mike Sojourner	6 ft 9 in (2.06 m)	225 lb (102 kg)		Utah
G/F	5	Tom Van Arsdale	6 ft 5 in (1.96 m)	202 lb (92 kg)		Indiana
G/F	25	John Wetzel	6 ft 5 in (1.96 m)	190 lb (86 kg)		Virginia Tech

Coaches
Head coach
- Cotton Fitzsimmons
Assistant(s)
- Bumper Tormohlen

Legend
- (DP) Unsigned draft pick
- (FA) Free agent
- (S) Suspended
- Injured

== Regular season ==
=== Season standings ===
Central Division	W	L	PCT	GB	Home	Road	Div
y-Washington Bullets	60	22	.732	–	36–5	24–17	22–8
x-Houston Rockets	41	41	.500	19	29–12	12–29	16–14
Cleveland Cavaliers	40	42	.488	20	29–12	11–30	17–13
Atlanta Hawks	31	51	.378	29	22–19	9–32	11–19
New Orleans Jazz	23	59	.280	37	20–21	3–38	9–21

#	Eastern Conference				
#	Team	W	L	PCT	GB
1	z-Boston Celtics	60	22	.732	–
2	y-Washington Bullets	60	22	.732	–
3	x-Buffalo Braves	49	33	.598	11
4	x-Houston Rockets	41	41	.500	19
5	x-New York Knicks	40	42	.488	20
6	Cleveland Cavaliers	40	42	.488	20
7	Philadelphia 76ers	34	48	.415	26
8	Atlanta Hawks	31	51	.378	29
9	New Orleans Jazz	23	59	.280	37

z – clinched division title
y – clinched division title
x – clinched playoff spot

=== Game log ===
1974–75 Game log
#	Date	Opponent	Score	High points	Record
1	October 18	@ Chicago	115–120 (OT)	John Drew (32)	0–1
2	October 19	Houston	112–118	Lou Hudson (26)	1–1
3	October 22	Philadelphia	92–125	John Drew (41)	2–1
4	October 24	Cleveland	116–97	John Drew (25)	2–2
5	October 25	@ Boston	109–116	Lou Hudson (36)	2–3
6	October 30	@ Detroit	104–96	Lou Hudson (24)	3–3
7	October 31	@ New York	90–93	John Drew (27)	3–4
8	November 2	Boston	126–125	Lou Hudson (25)	3–5
9	November 7	Phoenix	108–109	John Brown (24)	4–5
10	November 9	Portland	119–115	Hudson, Van Arsdale (23)	4–6
11	November 10	@ Milwaukee	99–94	Tom Van Arsdale (23)	5–6
12	November 12	@ Golden State	111–128	Tom Van Arsdale (24)	5–7
13	November 14	@ Portland	92–104	John Drew (31)	5–8
14	November 16	New Orleans	104–130	John Drew (44)	6–8
15	November 19	Seattle	113–122	John Drew (34)	7–8
16	November 21	New York	101–95	Tom Van Arsdale (23)	7–9
17	November 22	@ New Orleans	86–90	John Drew (23)	7–10
18	November 23	Kansas City–Omaha	103–100	Tom Van Arsdale (21)	7–11
19	November 26	Washington	102–119	Tom Van Arsdale (33)	8–11
20	November 27	@ Washington	104–114	Dean Meminger (26)	8–12
21	November 29	@ Houston	96–91	Tom Van Arsdale (20)	9–12
22	December 3	@ Phoenix	91–85	Tom Van Arsdale (22)	10–12
23	December 6	@ Los Angeles	84–100	Dean Meminger (22)	10–13
24	December 8	@ Seattle	102–95	John Drew (27)	11–13
25	December 10	@ Portland	107–103	Drew, Henderson, Jones (16)	12–13
26	December 12	Golden State	129–109	John Drew (32)	12–14
27	December 14	Boston	92–90 (OT)	Tom Van Arsdale (28)	12–15
28	December 17	Washington	85–96	John Drew (24)	13–15
29	December 19	Chicago	88–80	John Drew (18)	13–16
30	December 20	@ Buffalo	113–102	John Drew (26)	14–16
31	December 21	Houston	101–96	Tom Van Arsdale (23)	14–17
32	December 23	@ Philadelphia	88–100	John Drew (26)	14–18
33	December 25	@ Washington	92–110	John Brown (28)	14–19
34	December 26	@ Houston	86–114	Jim Washington (16)	14–20
35	December 28	Los Angeles	89–106	John Drew (40)	15–20
36	December 29	@ Cleveland	103–110	Tom Henderson (27)	15–21
37	January 1	@ Kansas City–Omaha	102–97	John Drew (22)	16–21
38	January 2	@ Milwaukee	111–116	Tom Van Arsdale (20)	16–22
39	January 4	Buffalo	121–108	Drew, Gilliam (22)	16–23
40	January 7	Cleveland	112–113 (OT)	Tom Henderson (30)	17–23
41	January 8	@ Boston	96–104	Tom Henderson (25)	17–24
42	January 10	@ Chicago	113–116	John Drew (26)	17–25
43	January 11	Detroit	118–113	John Drew (28)	17–26
44	January 16	Washington	85–108	Tom Henderson (30)	18–26
45	January 18	Buffalo	129–115	Tom Van Arsdale (26)	18–27
46	January 19	Seattle	109–117	Tom Van Arsdale (32)	19–27
47	January 21	New Orleans	103–135	Tom Van Arsdale (27)	20–27
48	January 23	Houston	96–95	Tom Van Arsdale (28)	20–28
49	January 24	@ Detroit	103–113	Tom Van Arsdale (23)	20–29
50	January 25	Milwaukee	101–117	Tom Van Arsdale (28)	21–29
51	January 28	@ New York	111–115	Herm Gilliam (22)	21–30
52	January 30	New York	117–115	Tom Van Arsdale (27)	21–31
53	January 31	@ Buffalo	101–111	Tom Van Arsdale (24)	21–32
54	February 1	@ Cleveland	109–112 (OT)	Tom Henderson (32)	21–33
55	February 4	Cleveland	97–111	Tom Henderson (27)	22–33
56	February 6	Detroit	98–111	John Drew (23)	23–33
57	February 7	@ Houston	97–105	John Drew (19)	23–34
58	February 8	New Orleans	106–102	Dwight Jones (23)	23–35
59	February 10	@ New Orleans	89–96	John Brown (19)	23–36
60	February 14	@ Los Angeles	100–108	John Drew (31)	23–37
61	February 15	@ Phoenix	111–107	Tom Van Arsdale (35)	24–37
62	February 20	@ Golden State	102–108	Tom Van Arsdale (25)	24–38
63	February 21	@ Seattle	108–110	Herm Gilliam (26)	24–39
64	February 23	@ Cleveland	105–111 (OT)	Tom Van Arsdale (30)	24–40
65	February 27	Chicago	111–91	John Drew (21)	24–41
66	March 1	Kansas City–Omaha	95–108	John Drew (29)	25–41
67	March 4	Los Angeles	97–109	John Drew (27)	26–41
68	March 5	@ Washington	112–118	Mike Sojourner (29)	26–42
69	March 6	Golden State	106–110	John Drew (38)	27–42
70	March 8	New Orleans	101–113	Tom Van Arsdale (27)	28–42
71	March 11	Washington	99–87	Herm Gilliam (18)	28–43
72	March 13	Milwaukee	120–104	Mike Sojourner (23)	28–44
73	March 15	@ New Orleans	123–140	Herm Gilliam (24)	28–45
74	March 16	Phoenix	114–117	Tom Van Arsdale (27)	29–45
75	March 18	@ Kansas City–Omaha	101–105	Herm Gilliam (22)	29–46
76	March 21	@ Philadelphia	103–114	Dwight Jones (24)	29–47
77	March 22	Philadelphia	100–104	Tom Van Arsdale (23)	30–47
78	March 25	Portland	105–89	Mike Sojourner (22)	30–48
79	March 29	Cleveland	97–103	Tom Henderson (25)	31–48
80	March 30	@ New Orleans	105–108	Herm Gilliam (22)	31–49
81	April 1	@ Houston	104–113	Herm Gilliam (24)	31–50
82	April 5	@ Washington	115–123	Jones, Van Arsdale (22)	31–51

== Awards and records ==
- John Drew, NBA All-Rookie Team 1st Team
