= Loyola Field House =

Indoor arena in New Orleans, Louisiana

- Location: New Orleans, Louisiana
- Coordinates: 29°56′15.2″N 90°7′11.8″W
- Owner: Loyola University New Orleans
- Operator: Loyola University New Orleans
- Capacity: 6,500

Construction
- Opened: 1954
- Demolished: 1986

Tenants
- Loyola Wolfpack (NCAA) (1954–1972); New Orleans Buccaneers (ABA) (1967–1969); New Orleans Jazz (NBA) (1974–1975)

Loyola Field House was an indoor arena in New Orleans, Louisiana. It hosted the American Basketball Association (ABA)'s New Orleans Buccaneers (Bucs) for two seasons (1967–68 and 1968–69), and the National Basketball Association's New Orleans Jazz (1974–75). It was also the home venue for Loyola Wolf Pack basketball. The arena held 6,500 people.

== History ==
The Field House was built on the campus of Loyola University in New Orleans in 1954 as a home for the university's basketball team.

When the ABA awarded New Orleans a franchise in 1967, the Bucs made an agreement to play their home games at the Field House. They advanced to the ABA Finals in 1967–68, losing to the Pittsburgh Pipers in seven games. The team was led by Doug Moe and Larry Brown, ABA stars and future successful coaches. For the 1969–70 season, their third, the team moved to Tulane Gymnasium and the Municipal Auditorium. After the season, the team relocated to Memphis as the Memphis Pros.

The New Orleans Jazz played some of their home games at the Field House for their inaugural 1974–75 season.

When Loyola dropped varsity sports after the 1971–72 school year, the building became the Recreation Center, with most of the seating torn out. The building was demolished in 1986 to make way for a new Recreational Sports Complex and parking garage.
