= 1974–75 NBA season =

29th NBA season

- League: National Basketball Association
- Sport: Basketball
- Duration: October 17, 1974 – April 6, 1975; April 8 – May 14, 1975 (Playoffs); May 18–25, 1975 (Finals)
- Games: 82
- Teams: 18
- TV partner: CBS

Draft
- Top draft pick: Bill Walton
- Picked by: Portland Trail Blazers

Regular season
- Top seed: Boston Celtics
- Season MVP: Bob McAdoo (Buffalo)
- Top scorer: Bob McAdoo (Buffalo)

Playoffs
- Eastern champions: Washington Bullets
- Eastern runners-up: Boston Celtics
- Western champions: Golden State Warriors
- Western runners-up: Chicago Bulls

Finals
- Champions: Golden State Warriors
- Runners-up: Washington Bullets
- Finals MVP: Rick Barry (Golden State)

NBA seasons
- ← 1973–74 1975–76 →

The 1974–75 NBA season was the 29th season of the National Basketball Association. The season ended with the Golden State Warriors winning the NBA championship, sweeping the Washington Bullets 4 games to 0 in the NBA Finals.

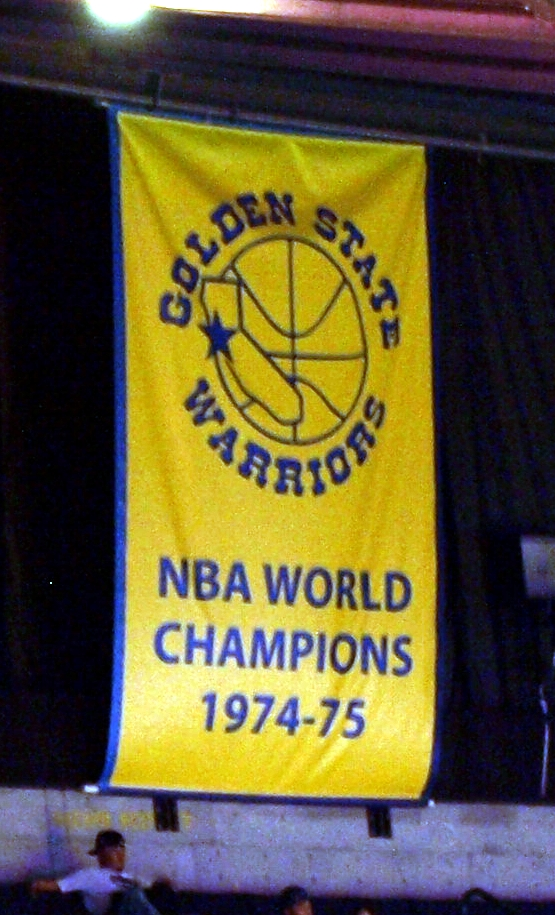
The Warriors' 1975 championship banner.

== Notable occurrences ==
- The New Orleans Jazz became the league's 18th franchise.
- Originally, the NBA voted to award a new expansion franchise to the city of Toronto during the offseason period, with plans for their creation being set to begin by the 1975–76 NBA season. However, on the same day as the NBA All-Star Game this season, the NBA's Board of Governors voted to not expand into Toronto for the 1975–76 season after all, probably due to a potential ABA-NBA merger still being on the table in the near future.
- The 1975 NBA All-Star Game was played at Arizona Veterans Memorial Coliseum in Phoenix, Arizona, with the East beating the West 108–102. Walt Frazier of the New York Knicks won the game's MVP award.
- The NBA Playoffs were expanded from four teams per conference to five teams, adding another round to the playoffs consisting of a best-of-three series between the Nos. 4 and 5 seeds in each conference, with the winner earning the right to play the No. 1 seed in the conference semifinals.
- The Capital Bullets were renamed the Washington Bullets.
- The Los Angeles Lakers miss the playoffs for the first time since their 1960 move to Southern California.
- The Milwaukee Bucks also miss the playoffs for the first time since their inaugural season and also marked Kareem Abdul-Jabbar's last season with the Bucks before being traded to the Lakers, following the season.
- Legendary referee Mendy Rudolph was forced to retire after suffering a blood clot in one of his lungs during a playoff game between the Buffalo Braves and Washington Bullets. Rudolph officiated more than 2,400 games over 24 seasons and worked the NBA Finals every season from 1955 through 1974. Rudolph was enshrined in the Naismith Basketball Hall of Fame in 2007.

Coaching changes
Offseason
Team	1973–74 coach	1974–75 coach
Portland Trail Blazers	Jack McCloskey	Lenny Wilkens
In-season
Team	Outgoing coach	Incoming coach
New Orleans Jazz	Scotty Robertson; Elgin Baylor	Butch Van Breda Kolff

== Season recap ==
The Warriors, with a record of 48–34, had low expectations against the Boston Celtics and the Bullets, both whom finished with records of 60–22.

At the start of the 1974–75 season, the Warriors underwent numerous roster changes, trading away Nate Thurmond for Clifford Ray, a first-round draft pick and $500,000 cash, which was the original motive of the trade. This led some sports writers to predict the Warriors would not even make the playoffs.

The selection of rookie Keith Wilkes, who was later named Rookie of the Year, contributed to the team's performance despite initial concerns about his transition to the NBA. His play, alongside Finals MVP Rick Barry, a First Team All-NBA selection, and teammates such as Clifford Ray and Butch Beard, provided sufficient support against the Washington Bullets. The Bullets featured players including Wes Unseld, Kevin Porter and Elvin Hayes.

Until 2015, this was the only championship won by the Warriors in the San Francisco Bay area.

The defending champion Boston Celtics were the topic of much discussion as the season started. The team had upset Milwaukee and super giant Kareem Abdul-Jabbar a year ago, bringing the team full circle from the days of Bill Russell. Cowens was second again in rebounds while scoring over 20 points per game. The Celtics roared to 60 wins this year, despite losing Dave Cowens with a broken foot at the 65-game mark. Jo Jo White was right there with the two stars in scoring, while Paul Silas continued his solid tradition of rebounding. Reserve Don Nelson, the future coaching great, shot just often enough to lead the NBA in accuracy from the floor. Boston's ability to outrebound and outpass teams led to many of those wins. The NBA's other 60-win team was the Washington Bullets. The team had a different name for the third straight year, but the same core of players. Elvin Hayes and Phil Chenier were the scorers, while Wes Unseld led the NBA in rebounds. Kevin Porter, a 6-foot fleet splinter, led the league in assists and foulouts and became a key part of the club. Even Mike Riordan, the discarded Knick, paid some dividends at forward. With Cowens battling injuries, they became a popular favorite in the East. Hayes, in particular, turned in another All-Pro caliber season as a leading rebounder and shot blocker. His inside defense, in combination with Unseld, created a lot of missed shots for opponents. While the NBA boasted two 60-win giants this year, no other team won over 50 games, a surprising fact. Nine teams did win 40 games or more to show the rising balance of the league. The best of these were Buffalo, Golden State and Chicago.

=== Atlantic ===
Buffalo supplanted New York as Boston's most serious rival in the Atlantic foursome with 49 wins. Buffalo boasted high-scoring super star Bob McAdoo. The Big Mac posted a 34.5 scoring average to lead the NBA, making more field goals than any other player. He also led in minutes played, while also ranking among the best rebounders and shot blockers in the league. The 6'10 220-pounder was threatening enough to also earn 798 free throw tries, another league high, converting a solid 81%. The Braves lost sensation Ernie DiGregorio to knee injury, watched former Laker Jim McMillian battle illness, and also lost Gar Heard for 25 games, which dropped the team from the elite and put more of the load on their star. This dimmed hopes for the playoffs.

This would be the high-water mark for the Braves franchise in Buffalo. The franchise left Buffalo to become the San Diego Clippers in 1978 and would not reach the 50-win mark until 2012–13, by which time the Clippers were in their 29th season in Los Angeles and 35th overall in Southern California.

=== Pacific ===
Golden State had the top-scoring offense in the league at 108.5 points per game to win the Pacific five and 48 games. Rick Barry scored 30.6 points per game, trying more shots than McAdoo. Barry sank 90% of his free throws with his unique underhand delivery and finished sixth in the NBA in assists. Barry also led the NBA in steals. Criticized in the past, Barry's season was such that many writers believed Barry, not Cowens, Hayes or McAdoo, to be the NBA's true MVP this year.

=== Central ===
The Washington Bullets led by Elvin Hayes and Wes Unseld won 60 games, a tie with the Boston Celtics for first in the league and the Houston Rockets led by Calvin Murphy and Rudy Tomjanovich reached their first season at .500 as well as made the playoffs for the first time in Houston and second in franchise history.

=== Midwest ===
The Chicago Bulls won 47 games to capture their first-ever division title. As usual, Chicago did it with a stifling defense that began with guards Jerry Sloan and Norm Van Lier. Holdout Bob Love missed 20 games but again led in scoring while signee Nate Thurmond got into the defense at center. The 33-year-old gave the team a needed rebounder while ranking third in the NBA in blocked shots.

The defending Western Conference champion Milwaukee Bucks suffered a precipitous decline following the retirement of Oscar Robertson, dropping from 59 wins in '73–'74 to 38 in '74–'75. This would be the final season in Wisconsin for Kareem Abdul-Jabbar, who forced a blockbuster trade during the summer of 1975 to the Lakers.

With the Bucks in the doldrums, it fell to Kansas City–Omaha to challenge Chicago for division supremacy. Nate Archibald responded by averaging 26.5 points per game, while Sam Lacey was a force in the paint with 11.4 rebounds a contest.

=== Playoffs ===
Seven NBA teams out of 17 finished over .500, but three teams, New York, Cleveland and Detroit, also had 40–42 records.

Boston drew a young 41–41 Houston team (who had just won their first playoff series against the Knicks 2–1). The Rockets had 20-point scorers Calvin Murphy and Rudy T., but the veteran Celtics got past the Rockets 4–1 and into the Conference Finals once again. The much tougher East bracket was Washington, with the same record as Boston, against the tough Buffalo Braves. Hayes vs. MacAdoo was the marquee matchup. But the Braves, who had traded Bob Kauffman, did not have the help for their star. Despite that, the series went the full seven before the Bullets won to advance. Randy Smith played in place of Ernie D, but not enough to turn the series the other way.

Out West, Golden State, still under the radar with many, met a solid Seattle team. Spencer Haywood, the SuperSonics' outspoken star, struggled with illnesses much of this year. Rookie center Tom Burleson and bombing guard Fred Brown picked up Haywood's slack with 20-point averages from the passes of guard Slick Watts, their first defender. But a 124–100 wipeout loss in Game Five put the writing on the wall as the Warriors advanced.

Chicago drew a Kansas City-Omaha team that had found success under second-year head coach Phil Johnson. The Bulls, aided by 4 separate 30-point performances from Bob Love, would prevail 4–2, after a decisive game 6 victory in Kansas City.

The Boston-Washington series was set, with DC native Red Auerbach in the shadows. Cowens and Hayes each turned in strong performances, but did not guard each other. Havlicek and White joined Cowens as 20-point Celtic scorers. The Celtics lost three of the first four ballgames. The inside defense of the Bullets, combined with free throws, allowed Washington to send the world champions home.

For some, this was a title in itself. But there was still one more round to play.

Most experts expected Chicago to get their hard-earned shot in a classic offense vs. defense series against Golden State. Thurmond was seeking revenge against his old team, which now had 6'10 Cliff Ray, a former Bull and a lesser center, in his former Warrior center spot. The series would be a full seven-game barnburner. The Bulls used a 90–89 Game Two win to start a 2–1 advantage. Golden State bounced back to win Game 4 but the Bulls won Game 5, making it 3–2. The Warriors won Game Six 86–72 in Chicago to force Game Seven at home. Bulls coach, Dick Motta, was giving most of the center minutes to rebounder Tom Boerwinkle, not Thurmond. With no bench scoring and Thurmond playing an average of just 20 minutes per game, The Warriors wiggled off the hook to win the game 83–79 and the series, 4–3. It was a hard loss for Bulls fans who had pulled for their team all decade.

=== Finals ===
Although many people and players were expecting a Boston-Warriors Final, a Washington-Warriors Final was still a match up that could bring excitement. But then the Bullets were unable to match the heroics they pulled off in the Eastern Conference Finals to beat Boston. The Warriors won Game 1 on the road 101–95, then won Games 2 and 3 at home, 92–91 and 109–101, respectively. Washington fans now expected the Bullets to come out blazing, and for Hayes and Unseld to take over the paint. Rookie Keith Wilkes, fresh from playing at local UCLA, was quietly having a strong playoffs at power forward. He was listed at 6'7 and 190 pounds, and was opposite the 6'10 240-pound Hayes. Barry and Wilkes were the only Warriors scorers over 15 points per game in the series, and two Warriors starters averaged less than 10 points per game. However, Game 4 was a one-point win, 96–95, and the Warriors pulled a remarkable sweep to win the series 4–0. Wilt Chamberlain had never won the title as a Warrior center, but now Cliff Ray had in his first try. Rick Barry averaged 28 points to be the star, but coach Al Attles' team had hustled throughout to clinch a third championship for the Warriors.

== Final standings ==
=== By division ===
Atlantic Division	W	L	PCT	GB	Home	Road	Div
y-Boston Celtics	60	22	.732	–	28–13	32–9	17–9
x-Buffalo Braves	49	33	.598	11	30–11	19–22	15–11
x-New York Knicks	40	42	.488	20	23–18	17–24	9–17
Philadelphia 76ers	34	48	.415	26	20–21	14–27	11–15

Central Division	W	L	PCT	GB	Home	Road	Div
y-Washington Bullets	60	22	.732	–	36–5	24–17	22–8
x-Houston Rockets	41	41	.500	19	29–12	12–29	16–14
Cleveland Cavaliers	40	42	.488	20	29–12	11–30	17–13
Atlanta Hawks	31	51	.378	29	22–19	9–32	11–19
New Orleans Jazz	23	59	.280	37	20–21	3–38	9–21

Midwest Division	W	L	PCT	GB	Home	Road	Div
y-Chicago Bulls	47	35	.573	–	29–12	18–23	11–15
x-Kansas City–Omaha Kings	44	38	.537	3	29–12	15–26	17–9
x-Detroit Pistons	40	42	.488	7	26–15	14–27	10–16
Milwaukee Bucks	38	44	.463	9	25–16	13–28	14–12

Pacific Division	W	L	PCT	GB	Home	Road	Div
y-Golden State Warriors	48	34	.585	–	31–10	17–24	19–11
x-Seattle SuperSonics	43	39	.524	5	24–16	19–23	18–12
Portland Trail Blazers	38	44	.463	10	29–13	9–31	16–14
Phoenix Suns	32	50	.390	16	22–19	10–31	12–18
Los Angeles Lakers	30	52	.366	18	21–20	9–32	10–20

=== By conference ===
#	Eastern Conference				
#	Team	W	L	PCT	GB
1	z-Boston Celtics	60	22	.732	–
2	y-Washington Bullets	60	22	.732	–
3	x-Buffalo Braves	49	33	.598	11
4	x-Houston Rockets	41	41	.500	19
5	x-New York Knicks	40	42	.488	20
6	Cleveland Cavaliers	40	42	.488	20
7	Philadelphia 76ers	34	48	.415	26
8	Atlanta Hawks	31	51	.378	29
9	New Orleans Jazz	23	59	.280	37

#	Western Conference				
#	Team	W	L	PCT	GB
1	z-Golden State Warriors	48	34	.585	–
2	y-Chicago Bulls	47	35	.573	1
3	x-Kansas City–Omaha Kings	44	38	.537	4
4	x-Seattle SuperSonics	43	39	.524	5
5	x-Detroit Pistons	40	42	.488	8
6	Portland Trail Blazers	38	44	.463	10
6	Milwaukee Bucks	38	44	.463	10
8	Phoenix Suns	32	50	.390	16
9	Los Angeles Lakers	30	52	.366	18

Notes

- z- Clinched Conference
- y – division champions
- x – clinched playoff spot

== Playoffs ==
First Round
E4	Houston	2
E5	New York	1
W4	Seattle	2
W5	Detroit	1

Conference Semifinals
E1	Boston*	4
E4	Houston	1
Eastern Conference
E3	Buffalo	3
E2	Washington*	4
W1	Golden State*	4
W4	Seattle	2
Western Conference
W3	Kansas City–Omaha	2
W2	Chicago*	4

Conference Finals
E1	Boston*	2
E2	Washington*	4
W1	Golden State*	4
W2	Chicago*	3

NBA Finals
E2	Washington*	0
W1	Golden State*	4

- * Division winner
- Bold Series winner
- Italic Team with home-court advantage

== Statistics leaders ==
Category	Player	Team	Stat
Points per game	Bob McAdoo	Buffalo Braves	34.5
Rebounds per game	Wes Unseld	Washington Bullets	14.8
Assists per game	Kevin Porter	Washington Bullets	8.0
Steals per game	Rick Barry	Golden State Warriors	2.85
Blocks per game	Kareem Abdul-Jabbar	Milwaukee Bucks	3.26
FG%	Don Nelson	Boston Celtics	.539
FT%	Rick Barry	Golden State Warriors	.904

== NBA awards ==
- Most Valuable Player: Bob McAdoo, Buffalo Braves
- Rookie of the Year: Keith Wilkes, Golden State Warriors
- Coach of the Year: Phil Johnson, Kansas City-Omaha Kings

- All-NBA First Team:
  - F – Rick Barry, Golden State Warriors
  - F – Elvin Hayes, Washington Bullets
  - C – Bob McAdoo, Buffalo Braves
  - G – Nate Archibald, Kansas City-Omaha Kings
  - G – Walt Frazier, New York Knicks
- All-NBA Second Team:
  - F – John Havlicek, Boston Celtics
  - F – Spencer Haywood, Seattle SuperSonics
  - C – Dave Cowens, Boston Celtics
  - G – Phil Chenier, Washington Bullets
  - G – Jo Jo White, Boston Celtics

- All-NBA Rookie Team:
  - Scott Wedman, Kansas City-Omaha Kings
  - Tommy Burleson, Seattle SuperSonics
  - Keith Wilkes, Golden State Warriors
  - Brian Winters, Los Angeles Lakers
  - John Drew, Atlanta Hawks

- NBA All-Defensive First Team:
  - John Havlicek – Boston Celtics
  - Paul Silas – Boston Celtics
  - Kareem Abdul-Jabbar- Milwaukee Bucks
  - Jerry Sloan – Chicago Bulls
  - Walt Frazier – New York Knicks
- NBA All-Defensive Second Team:
  - Elvin Hayes – Washington Bullets
  - Bob Love – Chicago Bulls
  - Dave Cowens – Boston Celtics
  - Norm Van Lier – Chicago Bulls
  - Don Chaney – Boston Celtics

== See also ==
- 1975 NBA Finals
- 1975 NBA playoffs
- 1974–75 ABA season
- List of NBA regular season records
