= 1973–74 Kansas City–Omaha Kings season =

NBA professional basketball team season

- Head coach: Bob Cousy; Draff Young; Phil Johnson
- Owners: Leon Karosen; Robert Margolin; H. Paul Rosenberg
- Arena: Municipal Auditorium; Omaha Civic Auditorium

Results
- Record: 33–49 (.402)
- Place: Division: 4th (Midwest); Conference: 7th (Western)
- Playoff finish: Did not qualify
- Stats at Basketball Reference

Local media
- Television: KMBC-TV/KETV
- Radio: KCMO/KFAB

The 1973–74 Kansas City–Omaha Kings season was the Kings' 25th season in the NBA and their second season in the cities of Kansas City and Omaha.

== Roster ==
1973–74 Kansas City–Omaha Kings roster
Players

Pos.	No.	Player	Height	Weight	DOB	From
G	10	Nate Archibald	6 ft 1 in (1.85 m)	165 lb (75 kg)		UTEP
F	11	Ron Behagen	6 ft 9 in (2.06 m)	185 lb (84 kg)		Minnesota
F	34	John Block	6 ft 9 in (2.06 m)	207 lb (94 kg)		USC
G	5	Mike D'Antoni	6 ft 3 in (1.91 m)	185 lb (84 kg)		Marshall
F	33	Ken Durrett	6 ft 7 in (2.01 m)	190 lb (86 kg)		La Salle
F	21	Don Kojis	6 ft 5 in (1.96 m)	215 lb (98 kg)		Marquette
G	15	Howard Komives	6 ft 1 in (1.85 m)	185 lb (84 kg)		Bowling Green
C	44	Sam Lacey	6 ft 10 in (2.08 m)	235 lb (107 kg)		New Mexico State
G	23	Ted Manakas	6 ft 1 in (1.85 m)	180 lb (82 kg)		Princeton
F	31	Larry McNeill	6 ft 9 in (2.06 m)	195 lb (88 kg)		Marquette
F	24	Jimmy Walker	6 ft 3 in (1.91 m)	195 lb (88 kg)		Providence
G/F	22	Nate Williams	6 ft 5 in (1.96 m)	215 lb (98 kg)		Utah State

Coaches
Head coach
- Phil Johnson

Legend
- (DP) Unsigned draft pick
- (FA) Free agent
- (S) Suspended
- Injured

== Regular season ==
=== Season standings ===
Midwest Division	W	L	PCT	GB	Home	Road	Neutral	Div
y-Milwaukee Bucks	59	23	.720	–	31–7	24–16	4–0	14–6
x-Chicago Bulls	54	28	.659	5	32–9	21–19	1–0	13–7
x-Detroit Pistons	52	30	.634	7	29–12	23–17	0–1	9–11
Kansas City–Omaha Kings	33	49	.402	26	20–21	13–28	–	4–16

#	Western Conference				
#	Team	W	L	PCT	GB
1	z-Milwaukee Bucks	59	23	.720	–
2	x-Chicago Bulls	54	28	.659	5
3	x-Detroit Pistons	52	30	.634	7
4	y-Los Angeles Lakers	47	35	.573	12
5	Golden State Warriors	44	38	.537	15
6	Seattle SuperSonics	36	46	.439	23
7	Kansas City–Omaha Kings	33	49	.402	26
8	Phoenix Suns	30	52	.366	29
9	Portland Trail Blazers	27	55	.329	32

z – clinched division title
y – clinched division title
x – clinched playoff spot

== Game log ==
1973–74 game log
Total: 33–49
October

Game	Date	Team	Score	High points	Location Attendance	Record
1	October 10	Chicago	L 90–105	Nate Archibald (42)		0–1
2	October 12	Chicago	W 88–84	Nate Archibald (29)	Omaha Civic Auditorium	1–1
3	October 13	@ Atlanta	W 117–102	John Block (26)		2–1
4	October 17	@ Seattle	W 108–106	Nate Archibald (27)		3–1
5	October 19	@ Portland	L 99–111	Nate Archibald (21)		3–2
6	October 20	@ Golden State	L 81–100	Ken Durrett (17)		3–3
7	October 24	Los Angeles	L 91–92	Sam Lacey (24)	Omaha Civic Auditorium	3–4
8	October 26	Phoenix	W 98–93	Ron Behagen (20)		4–4
9	October 28	Buffalo	W 112–100	John Block (27)		4–5
10	October 30	Milwaukee	L 78–112	John Block (25)		4–6

November

Game	Date	Team	Score	High points	Location Attendance	Record
11	November 2	Seattle	L 109–115	Jimmy Walker (24)		4–7
12	November 4	Golden State	L 91–92	Ron Behagen (21)		4–8
13	November 9	Capital	L 96–109	Jimmy Walker (24)	Omaha Civic Auditorium	4–9
14	November 10	@ Milwaukee	L 83–84	Jimmy Walker (20)		4–10
15	November 11	@ Cleveland	W 103–93	Jimmy Walker (27)		5–10
16	November 14	Houston	W 118–116 (OT)	Jimmy Walker (31)		6–10
17	November 16	@ Detroit	L 98–125	McNeill, Williams (21)		6–11
18	November 17	Boston	L 110–123	Nate Williams (27)		6–12
19	November 20	Philadelphia	L 103–109	Jimmy Walker (18)		6–13
20	November 21	Philadelphia	L 90–103	Nate Williams (22)	Omaha Civic Auditorium	6–14
21	November 23	@ Boston	L 102–119	Jimmy Walker (25)		6–15
22	November 24	@ Buffalo	L 131–143	Nate Williams (28)		6–16
23	November 25	Seattle	L 99–104	Nate Archibald (21)		6–17
24	November 27	Atlanta	L 110–129	Nate Archibald (28)	Omaha Civic Auditorium	6–18
25	November 29	@ Phoenix	L 99–119	Nate Archibald (24)		6–19
26	November 30	@ Los Angeles	L 107–123	Don Kojis (22)		6–20

December

Game	Date	Team	Score	High points	Location Attendance	Record
27	December 1	@ Golden State	L 108–120	Sam Lacey (26)		6–21
28	December 5	Atlanta	W 117–105	Jimmy Walker (29)	Omaha Civic Auditorium	7–21
29	December 7	@ Philadelphia	W 113–102	Jimmy Walker (32)		8–21
30	December 9	Detroit	L 80–86	Jimmy Walker (17)	Omaha Civic Auditorium	8–22
31	December 11	@ Chicago	L 104–105	Jimmy Walker (27)		8–23
32	December 15	@ New York	L 107–116	Nate Williams (25)		8–24
33	December 16	Detroit	W 105–104	Jimmy Walker (25)		9–24
34	December 19	Cleveland	W 106–92	Don Kojis (24)	Omaha Civic Auditorium	10–24
35	December 20	Capital	L 92–98	Jimmy Walker (20)		10–25
36	December 22	Buffalo	W 122–112	Jimmy Walker (24)		11–25
37	December 23	Golden State	W 101–93	Jimmy Walker (26)		12–25
38	December 26	@ Houston	L 95–110	Jimmy Walker (16)		12–26
39	December 27	@ Cleveland	W 110–100	Walker, Williams (26)		13–26
40	December 29	@ Capital	W 106–102	Nate Archibald (24)		14–26
41	December 30	New York	L 85–102	Larry McNeill (16)		14–27

January

Game	Date	Team	Score	High points	Location Attendance	Record
42	January 2	Boston	W 109–97	Nate Archibald (26)		15–27
43	January 3	@ Milwaukee	L 105–120	Nate Williams (30)		15–28
44	January 4	Phoenix	W 122–97	Sam Lacey (21)		16–28
45	January 6	@ Los Angeles	L 105–109	Nate Archibald (31)		16–29
46	January 8	@ Portland	L 110–129	John Block (18)		16–30
47	January 9	@ Seattle	L 96–100	Nate Williams (28)		16–31
48	January 11	@ Phoenix	W 117–100	Jimmy Walker (25)		17–31
49	January 13	Portland	W 103–99	Nate Archibald (26)	Omaha Civic Auditorium	18–31
50	January 18	Los Angeles	L 115–116	Nate Williams (24)		18–32
51	January 19	Cleveland	W 111–108	Jimmy Walker (22)		19–32
52	January 20	@ Detroit	L 79–105	Don Kojis (12)		19–33
53	January 22	Portland	W 103–96	Nate Archibald (31)		20–33
54	January 25	@ Buffalo	W 118–113	Jimmy Walker (26)		21–33
55	January 27	@ Boston	L 98–119	Behagen, Lacey (17)		21–34
56	January 30	New York	L 88–108	Lacey, Williams (16)	Omaha Civic Auditorium	21–35

February

Game	Date	Team	Score	High points	Location Attendance	Record
57	February 1	@ Chicago	L 88–99	Nate Williams (26)		21–36
58	February 6	Chicago	L 95–112	Nate Williams (20)	Omaha Civic Auditorium	21–37
59	February 8	@ Portland	W 104–99	Jimmy Walker (27)		22–37
60	February 9	@ Golden State	W 121–120	Jimmy Walker (36)		23–37
61	February 10	@ Seattle	L 103–119	Nate Williams (16)		23–38
62	February 12	@ Detroit	L 106–113	Nate Williams (23)		23–39
63	February 13	@ Capital	L 87–89	Jimmy Walker (24)		23–40
64	February 15	@ Philadelphia	L 89–92	Nate Williams (22)		23–41
65	February 19	Los Angeles	L 86–92	Jimmy Walker (30)		24–41
66	February 20	Golden State	W 116–97	Jimmy Walker (27)	Omaha Civic Auditorium	25–41
67	February 22	Phoenix	W 119–104	Jimmy Walker (34)		26–41
68	February 24	Milwaukee	L 93–100	Jimmy Walker (26)		26–42
69	February 26	@ Houston	L 101–118	Jimmy Walker (24)		26–43
70	February 27	@ Atlanta	W 85–76	Don Kojis (20)		27–43

March

Game	Date	Team	Score	High points	Location Attendance	Record
71	March 1	@ Los Angeles	L 100–107	Sam Lacey (22)		27–44
72	March 3	@ Phoenix	L 100–113	Jimmy Walker (26)		27–45
73	March 4	@ Milwaukee	L 103–109	Behagen, Walker (24)		27–46
74	March 6	Milwaukee	L 99–111	Jimmy Walker (25)	Omaha Civic Auditorium	27–47
75	March 9	Seattle	W 106–96	Don Kojis (27)	Omaha Civic Auditorium	28–47
76	March 12	@ Chicago	W 93–91	Jimmy Walker (28)		29–47
77	March 17	Houston	W 125–114	Don Kojis (30)	Omaha Civic Auditorium	30–47
78	March 18	Portland	W 114–105	Jimmy Walker (38)		31–47
79	March 20	Chicago	L 86–87	Jimmy Walker (19)		31–48
80	March 22	Detroit	W 107–105	Ken Durrett (24)		32–48
81	March 23	@ New York	W 107–106	Jimmy Walker (28)		33–48
82	March 26	@ Milwaukee	L 98–118	Sam Lacey (21)		33–49

== Awards and records ==
- Ron Behagen, NBA All-Rookie Team 1st Team
