= 1973–74 Cleveland Cavaliers season =

NBA professional basketball team season

- Head coach: Bill Fitch
- Arena: Cleveland Arena

Results
- Record: 29–53 (.354)
- Place: Division: 4th (Central); Conference: 7th (Eastern)
- Playoff finish: Did not qualify
- Stats at Basketball Reference

Local media
- Television: WEWS-TV (Gib Shanley, Hal Lebovitz)
- Radio: WWWE (Joe Tait)

The 1973–74 Cleveland Cavaliers season was the fourth season of NBA basketball in Cleveland, Ohio. The Cavaliers finished the season with a 29–53 record, finishing last in the Central Division and 7th Eastern Conference. Austin Carr was named an All-Star and set the team record for points per game. The Cavaliers played, and won, their last game in Cleveland Arena.

== Offseason ==
=== Trades ===
April 24: Cavaliers trade center Rick Roberson and forward John Johnson and switch positions in the first round of the 1973 NBA draft with the Portland Trail Blazers in exchange for the Trail Blazers' first round choice and four other draft choices. The Cavaliers select forward Jim Brewer with Portland's first pick.

== Roster ==
1973–74 Cleveland Cavaliers roster
Players

Pos.	No.	Player	Height	Weight	DOB	From
PF	52	Jim Brewer	6 ft 9 in (2.06 m)	210 lb (95 kg)	1951-12-03	Minnesota
G	34	Austin Carr	6 ft 4 in (1.93 m)	200 lb (91 kg)	1948-03-10	Notre Dame
G	35	Jim Cleamons	6 ft 3 in (1.91 m)	185 lb (84 kg)	1949-09-13	Ohio State
F	40	Barry Clemens	6 ft 6 in (1.98 m)	210 lb (95 kg)	1943-05-01	Ohio Wesleyan
F	42	Dwight Davis	6 ft 8 in (2.03 m)	220 lb (100 kg)	1949-10-28	Houston
C	50	Steve Patterson	6 ft 9 in (2.06 m)	225 lb (102 kg)	1948-06-24	UCLA
G/F	7	Bingo Smith	6 ft 5 in (1.96 m)	195 lb (88 kg)	1946-02-26	Tulsa
G	11	John Warren	6 ft 3 in (1.91 m)	180 lb (82 kg)	1947-07-07	St. John's
G	19	Lenny Wilkens	6 ft 1 in (1.85 m)	180 lb (82 kg)	1937-10-28	Providence
C	44	Luke Witte	7 ft 0 in (2.13 m)	230 lb (104 kg)	1950-10-19	Ohio State

Coaches
Head coach
- Bill Fitch

Legend
- (DP) Unsigned draft pick
- (FA) Free agent
- (S) Suspended
- Injured

== Regular season ==
=== Season standings ===
Central Division	W	L	PCT	GB	Home	Road	Neutral	Div
y-Capital Bullets	47	35	.573	–	31–10	15–25	1–0	14–8
Atlanta Hawks	35	47	.427	12	23–18	12–25	0–4	13–9
Houston Rockets	32	50	.390	15	18–23	13–25	1–2	9–13
Cleveland Cavaliers	29	53	.354	18	18–23	11–28	0–2	8–14

#	Eastern Conference				
#	Team	W	L	PCT	GB
1	z-Boston Celtics	56	26	.683	–
2	x-New York Knicks	49	33	.598	7
3	y-Capital Bullets	47	35	.573	9
4	x-Buffalo Braves	42	40	.512	14
5	Atlanta Hawks	35	47	.427	21
6	Houston Rockets	32	50	.390	24
7	Cleveland Cavaliers	29	53	.354	27
8	Philadelphia 76ers	25	57	.305	31

== Game log ==
1973–74 game log
Total: 29–53 (Home: 18–23; Road: 11–28; Neutral: 0–2)
October: 2–7 (home: 2–4; road: 0–3)

Game	Date	Team	Score	High points	High rebounds	High assists	Location Attendance	Record
1	October 12, 1973	Houston	L 106–99	Austin Carr (24)	Brewer, Wilkens (7)	Lenny Wilkens (7)	Cleveland Arena; 3,624	0–1
2	October 14, 1973	Detroit	L 95–83	Dwight Davis (18)	Dwight Davis (13)	Lenny Wilkens (8)	Cleveland Arena; 2,855	0–2
3	October 19, 1973	New York	L 92–90	Austin Carr (28)	Jim Brewer (13)	Lenny Wilkens (10)	Cleveland Arena; 5,102	0–3
4	October 20, 1973	@ Milwaukee	L 88–101	Austin Carr (24)	Dwight Davis (12)	Carr, Rule (4)	Milwaukee Arena; 8,837	0–4
5	October 23, 1973	Portland	W 96–103	Lenny Wilkens (30)	Bingo Smith (15)	Austin Carr (7)	Cleveland Arena; 2,437	1–4
6	October 26, 1973	N Buffalo	L 97–104	Dwight Davis (19)	Dwight Davis (14)	Lenny Wilkens (7)	Maple Leaf Gardens; 7,187	1–5
7	October 27, 1973	Buffalo	L 111–101	Austin Carr (27)	Bob Rule (6)	Austin Carr (7)	Cleveland Arena; 4,313	1–6
8	October 28, 1973	Boston	W 99–102	Austin Carr (31)	Bob Rule (13)	Lenny Wilkens (6)	Cleveland Arena; 2,808	2–6
9	October 31, 1973	@ Boston	L 110–128	Austin Carr (26)	Bob Rule (7)	Lenny Wilkens (7)	Boston Garden; 4,509	2–7

November: 7–9 (home: 4–4; road: 3–5)

Game	Date	Team	Score	High points	High rebounds	High assists	Location Attendance	Record
10	November 2, 1973	Milwaukee	L 118–100	Austin Carr (16)	Jim Brewer (13)	Lenny Wilkens (9)	Cleveland Arena; 5,361	2–8
11	November 3, 1973	@ Chicago	L 94–105	Austin Carr (26)	Jim Brewer (14)	Smith, Wilkens (3)	Chicago Stadium; 5,733	2–9
12	November 4, 1973	Atlanta	L 115–110	Austin Carr (31)	Steve Patterson (10)	Lenny Wilkens (10)	Cleveland Arena; 3,587	2–10
13	November 6, 1973	Los Angeles	W 96–115	Bingo Smith (22)	Jim Brewer (16)	Lenny Wilkens (14)	Cleveland Arena; 3,124	3–10
14	November 9, 1973	Houston	W 106–111	Bingo Smith (23)	Jim Brewer (13)	Lenny Wilkens (12)	Cleveland Arena; 9,149	4–10
15	November 10, 1973	@ New York	L 90–100	Austin Carr (23)	Jim Brewer (9)	Carr, Wilkens (6)	Madison Square Garden; 18,999	4–11
16	November 11, 1973	Kansas City–Omaha	L 103–93	Austin Carr (27)	Steve Patterson (10)	Lenny Wilkens (6)	Cleveland Arena; 2,802	4–12
17	November 13, 1973	@ Golden State	L 115–128	Austin Carr (23)	Bingo Smith (11)	Smith, Wilkens (5)	Oakland-Alameda County Coliseum Arena; 2,194	4–13
18	November 16, 1973	@ Seattle	L 93–117	Austin Carr (26)	Dwight Davis (14)	Lenny Wilkens (7)	Seattle Center Coliseum; 11,770	4–14
19	November 18, 1973	@ Los Angeles	L 100–102	Austin Carr (24)	Steve Patterson (12)	Lenny Wilkens (8)	The Forum; 13,205	4–15
20	November 22, 1973	@ Houston	W 104–96	Austin Carr (27)	Steve Patterson (13)	Carr, Wilkens (4)	Hofheinz Pavilion; 4,789	5–15
21	November 23, 1973	@ Houston	W 85–83	Bingo Smith (20)	Dwight Davis (11)	Lenny Wilkens (8)	Hofheinz Pavilion; 3,653	6–15
22	November 25, 1973	Boston	L 107–101	Austin Carr (26)	Steve Patterson (11)	Austin Carr (9)	Cleveland Arena; 4,941	6–16
23	November 27, 1973	Seattle	W 118–120	Bingo Smith (34)	Dwight Davis (10)	Lenny Wilkens (20)	Cleveland Arena; 3,357	7–16
24	November 28, 1973	@ Detroit	W 96–91	Bingo Smith (23)	Brewer, Patterson (12)	Lenny Wilkens (11)	Cobo Arena; 2,601	8–16
25	November 30, 1973	Philadelphia	W 110–112	Austin Carr (34)	Dwight Davis (11)	Lenny Wilkens (9)	Cleveland Arena; 2,566	9–16

December: 5–11 (home: 3–6; road: 2–5)

Game	Date	Team	Score	High points	High rebounds	High assists	Location Attendance	Record
26	December 1, 1973	@ New York	L 99–119	Lenny Wilkens (24)	Dwight Davis (8)	Lenny Wilkens (3)	Madison Square Garden; 18,922	9–17
27	December 2, 1973	Houston	L 130–104	Fred Foster (18)	Jim Brewer (10)	Jim Cleamons (12)	Cleveland Arena; 2,354	9–18
28	December 5, 1973	@ Philadelphia	W 89–75	Austin Carr (26)	Dwight Davis (15)	Bingo Smith (5)	Spectrum; 4,230	10–18
29	December 7, 1973	Chicago	L 96–91	Austin Carr (18)	Steve Patterson (13)	Jim Cleamons (10)	Cleveland Arena; 2,868	10–19
30	December 9, 1973	Phoenix	L 117–106	Austin Carr (26)	Dwight Davis (13)	Jim Brewer (9)	Cleveland Arena; 3,042	10–20
31	December 11, 1973	Los Angeles	W 100–101 (OT)	Austin Carr (24)	Jim Brewer (17)	Austin Carr (7)	Cleveland Arena; 3,341	11–20
32	December 14, 1973	Buffalo	L 102–98	John Warren (24)	Dwight Davis (11)	Bingo Smith (7)	Cleveland Arena; 2,593	11–21
33	December 18, 1973	@ Buffalo	L 93–100	Austin Carr (24)	Brewer, Davis (12)	Austin Carr (6)	Buffalo Memorial Auditorium; 10,224	11–22
34	December 19, 1973	@ Kansas City–Omaha	L 92–106	Carr, Cleamons (21)	Davis, Smith (9)	Cleamons, Smith (4)	Omaha Civic Auditorium; 6,047	11–23
35	December 21, 1973	Seattle	W 96–101	Austin Carr (30)	Dwight Davis (10)	Jim Brewer (8)	Cleveland Arena; 2,173	12–23
36	December 22, 1973	@ Atlanta	W 108–98	Austin Carr (39)	Steve Patterson (10)	Dwight Davis (7)	The Omni; 5,602	13–23
37	December 23, 1973	Houston	W 91–99	Dwight Davis (23)	Dwight Davis (10)	Jim Cleamons (8)	Cleveland Arena; 3,074	14–23
38	December 26, 1973	@ Milwaukee	L 110–123	Austin Carr (29)	Jim Brewer (14)	Jim Brewer (7)	Milwaukee Arena; 9,986	14–24
39	December 27, 1973	Kansas City–Omaha	W 110–100	Austin Carr (24)	Dwight Davis (12)	Austin Carr (9)	Cleveland Arena; 5,417	14–25
40	December 29, 1973	N Boston	L 92–111	Jim Cleamons (18)	Dwight Davis (16)	Jim Cleamons (5)	Providence Civic Center; 6,321	14–26
41	December 30, 1973	Atlanta	L 99–94	Austin Carr (28)	Dwight Davis (11)	Lenny Wilkens (6)	Cleveland Arena; 6,442	14–27

January: 5–9 (home: 2–2; road: 3–7)

Game	Date	Team	Score	High points	High rebounds	High assists	Location Attendance	Record
42	January 4, 1974	Capital	L 94–91	Austin Carr (22)	Brewer, Davis, Smith (9)	Lenny Wilkens (7)	Cleveland Arena; 3,431	14–28
43	January 5, 1974	@ Atlanta	L 86–99	Austin Carr (15)	Dwight Davis (8)	Jim Cleamons (5)	The Omni; 7,370	14–29
44	January 9, 1974	@ Philadelphia	L 86–90	Dwight Davis (16)	Luke Witte (11)	Jim Cleamons (5)	Spectrum; 2,545	14–30
45	January 11, 1974	Detroit	L 106–96	Austin Carr (25)	Smith, Witte (8)	Austin Carr (7)	Cleveland Arena; 4,208	14–31
46	January 12, 1974	@ Detroit	W 117–112 (OT)	Austin Carr (27)	Dwight Davis (16)	Lenny Wilkens (9)	Cobo Arena; 5,644	15–31
47	January 13, 1974	Philadelphia	W 94–96	Austin Carr (26)	Dwight Davis (8)	Lenny Wilkens (11)	Cleveland Arena; 3,477	16–31
48	January 17, 1974	@ Capital	L 86–101	Austin Carr (22)	Dwight Davis (7)	Lenny Wilkens (8)	Capital Centre; 3,217	16–32
49	January 19, 1974	@ Kansas City–Omaha	L 108–111	Austin Carr (31)	Dwight Davis (16)	Lenny Wilkens (6)	Kemper Arena; 5,538	16–33
50	January 22, 1974	@ Los Angeles	W 111–110 (OT)	Lenny Wilkens (24)	Brewer, Witte (13)	Lenny Wilkens (10)	The Forum; 13,856	17–33
51	January 23, 1974	@ Phoenix	L 103–110	Bingo Smith (20)	Luke Witte (12)	Lenny Wilkens (13)	Arizona Veterans Memorial Coliseum; 5,017	17–34
52	January 25, 1974	@ Portland	W 87–84	Bingo Smith (20)	Steve Patterson (9)	Lenny Wilkens (6)	Memorial Coliseum; 8,484	18–34
53	January 26, 1974	@ Golden State	L 93–106	Bingo Smith (22)	Luke Witte (11)	Lenny Wilkens (7)	Oakland-Alameda County Coliseum Arena; 4,687	18–35
54	January 29, 1974	Atlanta	W 111–118	Bingo Smith (27)	Steve Patterson (12)	Lenny Wilkens (10)	Cleveland Arena; 4,453	19–35
55	January 30, 1974	@ Boston	L 108–120	Lenny Wilkens (24)	Steve Patterson (11)	Lenny Wilkens (8)	Boston Garden; 5,970	19–36

February: 4–11 (home: 2–7; road: 2–4)

Game	Date	Team	Score	High points	High rebounds	High assists	Location Attendance	Record
56	February 1, 1974	Capital	L 107–99	Austin Carr (28)	Dwight Davis (11)	Cleamons, Wilkens (9)	Cleveland Arena; 3,735	19–37
57	February 2, 1974	@ New York	L 87–103	Austin Carr (18)	Patterson, Witte (9)	Lenny Wilkens (4)	Madison Square Garden; 19,694	19–38
58	February 3, 1974	Chicago	L 108–94	Steve Patterson (17)	Steve Patterson (15)	Lenny Wilkens (11)	Cleveland Arena; 3,406	19–39
59	February 5, 1974	Milwaukee	L 102–87	Lenny Wilkens (18)	Dwight Davis (12)	Lenny Wilkens (9)	Cleveland Arena; 5,291	19–40
60	February 8, 1974	@ Houston	L 106–120	Austin Carr (22)	Steve Patterson (16)	Steve Patterson (10)	Hofheinz Pavilion; 4,237	19–41
61	February 9, 1974	@ Atlanta	L 90–99	Austin Carr (24)	Steve Patterson (14)	Lenny Wilkens (7)	The Omni; 5,534	19–42
62	February 10, 1974	Buffalo	W 121–125	Austin Carr (35)	Steve Patterson (10)	Fred Foster (8)	Cleveland Arena; 2,997	20–42
63	February 12, 1974	Capital	L 107–99	Lenny Wilkens (22)	Steve Patterson (18)	Steve Patterson (6)	Cleveland Arena; 3,549	20–43
64	February 16, 1974	@ Portland	W 106–101	Steve Patterson (22)	Steve Patterson (19)	Lenny Wilkens (10)	Memorial Coliseum; 5,583	21–43
65	February 17, 1974	@ Seattle	L 97–106	Lenny Wilkens (25)	Steve Patterson (14)	Lenny Wilkens (7)	Seattle Center Coliseum; 14,078	21–44
66	February 19, 1974	Golden State	L 104–98	Austin Carr (34)	Steve Patterson (11)	Lenny Wilkens (11)	Cleveland Arena; 2,946	21–45
67	February 21, 1974	Golden State	L 122–103	Austin Carr (26)	Steve Patterson (16)	Lenny Wilkens (6)	Cleveland Arena; 1,641	21–46
68	February 22, 1974	New York	L 117–110	Austin Carr (32)	Jim Cleamons (8)	Lenny Wilkens (6)	Cleveland Arena; 7,781	21–47
69	February 23, 1974	@ Capital	W 104–101	Austin Carr (28)	Dwight Davis (11)	Lenny Wilkens (8)	Capital Centre; 9,247	22–47
70	February 24, 1974	Phoenix	W 97–101	Lenny Wilkens (19)	Steve Patterson (11)	Carr, Wilkens (6)	Cleveland Arena; 3,288	23–47

March: 6–6 (home: 5–0; road: 1–6)

Game	Date	Team	Score	High points	High rebounds	High assists	Location Attendance	Record
71	March 1, 1974	@ Philadelphia	W 110–93	Austin Carr (28)	Barry Clemens (17)	Lenny Wilkens (7)	Spectrum; 3,852	24–47
72	March 3, 1974	@ Capital	L 93–98	Austin Carr (24)	Brewer, Patterson (13)	Lenny Wilkens (6)	Capital Centre; 5,072	24–48
73	March 9, 1974	@ Phoenix	L 100–109	Austin Carr (16)	Dwight Davis (10)	Lenny Wilkens (7)	Arizona Veterans Memorial Coliseum; 6,153	24–49
74	March 10, 1974	@ Houston	L 108–113	Austin Carr (32)	Steve Patterson (9)	Lenny Wilkens (10)	Hofheinz Pavilion; 2,054	24–50
75	March 12, 1974	Atlanta	W 84–95	Carr, Smith (24)	Steve Patterson (18)	Lenny Wilkens (9)	Cleveland Arena; 4,514	25–50
76	March 15, 1974	Boston	W 103–104	Lenny Wilkens (24)	Dwight Davis (9)	Austin Carr (6)	Cleveland Arena; 7,304	26–50
77	March 16, 1974	@ Buffalo	L 105–114	Lenny Wilkens (18)	Steve Patterson (7)	Jim Cleamons (5)	Buffalo Memorial Auditorium; 18,000	26–51
78	March 17, 1974	Philadelphia	W 99–115	Austin Carr (31)	Steve Patterson (15)	Lenny Wilkens (14)	Cleveland Arena; 2,891	27–51
79	March 19, 1974	Portland	W 103–107	Bingo Smith (24)	Steve Patterson (16)	Lenny Wilkens (6)	Cleveland Arena; 3,379	28–51
80	March 20, 1974	@ Capital	L 91–101	Lenny Wilkens (26)	Steve Patterson (13)	Lenny Wilkens (9)	Capital Centre; 7,943	28–52
81	March 24, 1974	New York	W 92–114	Lenny Wilkens (22)	Davis, Patterson (8)	Lenny Wilkens (11)	Cleveland Arena; 8,829	29–52
82	March 26, 1974	@ Chicago	L 98–104	Carr, Smith (22)	Davis, Patterson (8)	Austin Carr (6)	Chicago Stadium; 5,327	29–53

1973–74 schedule
