= Mark Sibley =

American basketball player

Personal information
- Born: November 13, 1950 (age 76)
- Listed height: 6 ft 2 in (1.88 m)
- Listed weight: 175 lb (79 kg)

Career information
- High school: West (Rockford, Illinois)
- College: Northwestern (1970–1973)
- NBA draft: 1973: 4th round, 64th overall pick
- Drafted by: Chicago Bulls
- Playing career: 1973–1974
- Position: Point guard
- Number: 11

Career history
- 1973–1974: Portland Trail Blazers
- Stats at NBA.com
- Stats at Basketball Reference

Donald Mark Sibley (born November 13, 1950) is an American former basketball player. He was a 6'2" 175 lb guard and attended Northwestern University. He was selected in the fourth round of the 1973 NBA draft by the Chicago Bulls but was waived prior to the start of the 1973-74 season. He was the only rookie of 17 in Bulls camp to have graduated from college. He played one year for the Portland Trail Blazers, followed by one year of basketball for a team in Brugges, Belgium. He returned to Northwestern University to earn a Master of Arts in Teaching degree which led to a 33-year career of teaching English and coaching basketball and soccer at York High School in Elmhurst.

== Career statistics ==
Legend
| GP | Games played | GS | Games started | MPG | Minutes per game |
| FG% | Field goal percentage | 3P% | 3-point field goal percentage | FT% | Free throw percentage |
| RPG | Rebounds per game | APG | Assists per game | SPG | Steals per game |
| BPG | Blocks per game | PPG | Points per game | **Bold** | Career high |

=== NBA ===
==== Regular season ====
| Year | Team | GP | MPG | FG% | FT% | RPG | APG | SPG | BPG | PPG |
|---|---|---|---|---|---|---|---|---|---|---|
| 1973–74 | Portland | 28 | 4.4 | .357 | .857 | .9 | .5 | .1 | .0 | 1.6 |
