= Tom Kozelko =

American basketball player

Personal information
- Born: July 1, 1951 (age 75) Traverse City, Michigan, U.S.
- Listed height: 6 ft 8 in (2.03 m)
- Listed weight: 220 lb (100 kg)

Career information
- High school: Central (Traverse City, Michigan)
- College: Toledo (1970–1973)
- NBA draft: 1973: 3rd round, 48th overall pick
- Drafted by: Capital Bullets
- Playing career: 1973–1977
- Position: Power forward
- Number: 22

Career history
- 1973–1976: Capital / Washington Bullets
- 1976–1977: Lazio Basket

Career highlights
- 2× MAC Player of the Year (1972, 1973); 3× First-team All-MAC (1971–1973)
- Stats at NBA.com
- Stats at Basketball Reference

Thomas William Kozelko (born July 1, 1951) is a retired American basketball player who played briefly in the National Basketball Association (NBA).

Kozelko starred at Traverse City Central High School in Traverse City, Michigan and moved on to play collegiately at the University of Toledo from 1970 to 1973. Kozelko went on to become one of the best players in Rocket history, as he finished 1,561 points in his three-year career (freshmen were ineligible). He was the first player in Mid-American Conference history to be named MAC player of the year twice, in 1972 and 1973. He was named to the University of Toledo athletic Hall of Fame in 1983.

After completing his eligibility, Kozelko was drafted by the Capital Bullets in the third round (48th pick overall) of the 1973 NBA draft. He played three seasons for the Bullets (who later renamed themselves the Washington Bullets), averaging 10.1 minutes and 2.2 points per game.

== Career statistics ==
Legend
GP	Games played	GS	Games started	MPG	Minutes per game
FG%	Field goal percentage	3P%	3-point field goal percentage	FT%	Free throw percentage
RPG	Rebounds per game	APG	Assists per game	SPG	Steals per game
BPG	Blocks per game	PPG	Points per game	**Bold**	Career high

=== NBA ===
==== Regular season ====
Year	Team	GP	MPG	FG%	FT%	RPG	APG	SPG	BPG	PPG
1973–74	Capital	49	**11.7**	.444	.719	**2.5**	.5	**.4**	**.1**	**2.9**
1974–75	Washington	**73**	10.3	.359	**.861**	1.9	**.6**	**.4**	**.1**	2.1
1975–76	Washington	67	8.7	**.485**	.633	1.2	.5	.3	**.1**	1.7
Career		189	10.1	.419	.745	1.8	.5	.4	.1	2.2

==== Playoffs ====
Year	Team	GP	MPG	FG%	FT%	RPG	APG	SPG	BPG	PPG
1974	Capital	7	**8.3**	**.769**	.750	**1.1**	**.1**	.0	.0	**3.3**
1975	Washington	**13**	4.2	.455	.800	.5	**.1**	.0	.0	1.1
1976	Washington	5	2.8	.000	**1.000**	.4	.0	.0	**.2**	.4
Career		25	5.0	.600	.818	.7	.1	.0	.0	1.6
