= Ouachita Baptist Tigers =

- University: Ouachita Baptist University
- Conference: Great American Conference; Great Lakes Valley Conference (wrestling); New South Intercollegiate Swim Conference (swimming)
- NCAA: Division II
- Athletic director: David Sharp
- Location: Arkadelphia, Arkansas
- Varsity teams: 18 (9 men's, 9 women's)
- Football stadium: Cliff Harris Stadium / Benson-Williams Field
- Basketball arena: Bill Vining Arena
- Baseball stadium: Rab Rodgers Field
- Nickname: Tigers
- Colors: Purple and gold
- Website: obutigers.com
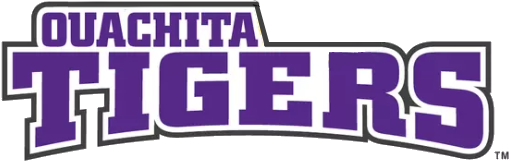

The Ouachita Baptist Tigers are composed of 16 teams representing Ouachita Baptist University in intercollegiate athletics, including men and women's basketball, golf, soccer, swimming, and tennis. Men's sports include baseball, football, and wrestling. Women's sports include volleyball, cross country, and softball. The Tigers compete in the NCAA Division II and are members of the Great American Conference. The wrestling team competes as a single-sport member of the Great Lakes Valley Conference. The men's and women's swimming teams compete in the New South Intercollegiate Swim Conference.

== Teams ==
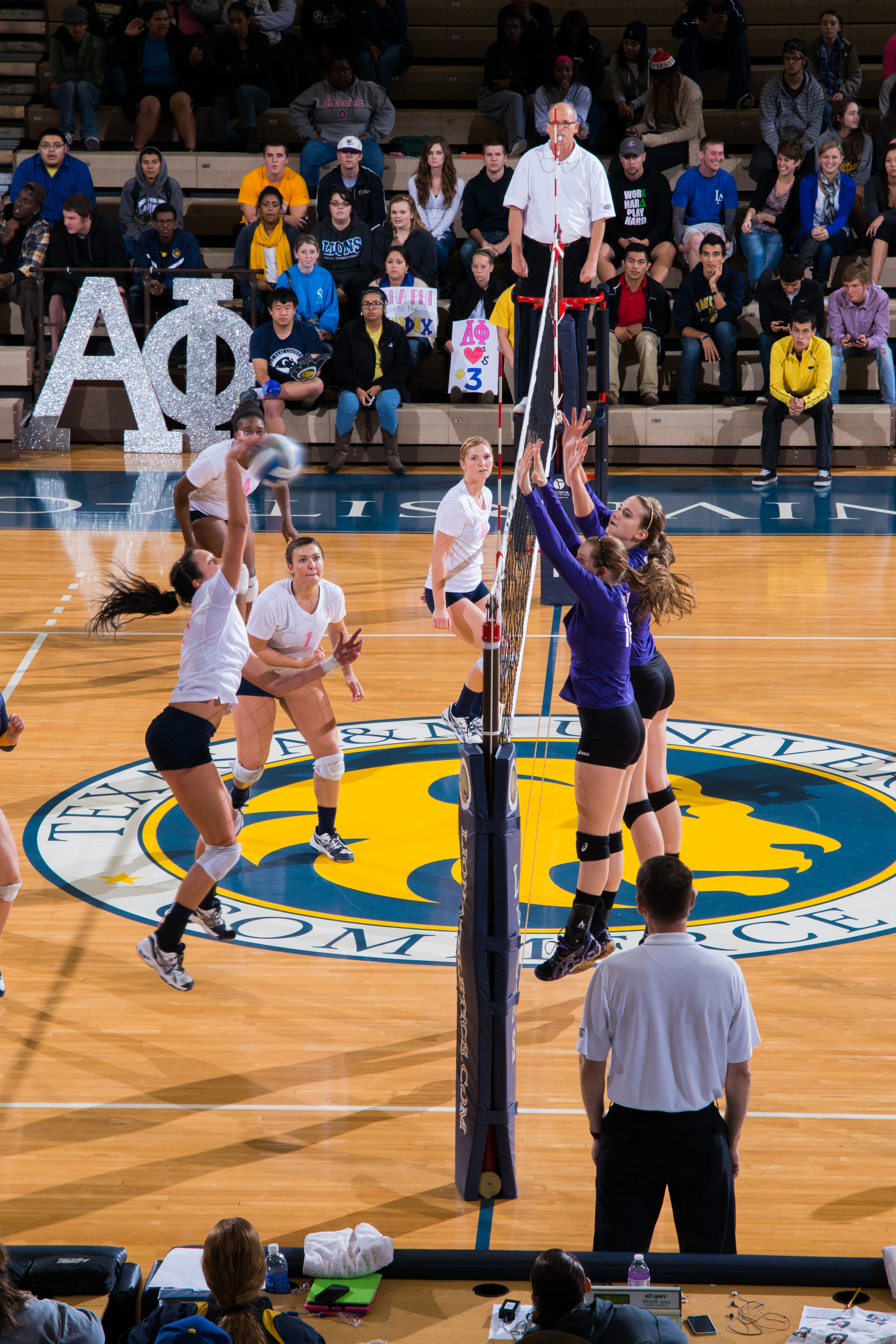
The Tigers women's volleyball team in action against the Texas A&M–Commerce Lions in 2013

Men's	Women's
Baseball	Basketball
Basketball	Cross Country
Cross Country	Soccer
Football	Softball
Soccer	Swimming & Diving
Swimming & Diving	Tennis
Tennis	Track & Field^{1}
Track & Field	Volleyball
Wrestling	
^{1} – includes both indoor and outdoor

== Baseball ==
Ouachita Baptist has had 5 Major League Baseball draft selections since the draft began in 1965.

Year	Player	Round	Team
1965	James Jordan	29	Giants
1969	Roger Pattillo	11	Phillies
1972	Paul Lancaster	30	Yankees
1976	Randolph Lamb	14	Astros
2008	Steve Smith	25	Indians
2014	Keegan Ghidotti	38	Orioles
2014	Davis Ward	40	Cardinals

== Basketball ==
Ouachita Baptist has had one NBA draft selection.

Year	Player	Round	Team
1972	Tommie Patterson	2 (#25 overall)	Baltimore Bullets
