= Rod Freeman =

Personal information
- Born: November 5, 1950 (age 76)
- Listed height: 6 ft 7 in (2.01 m)
- Listed weight: 225 lb (102 kg)

Career information
- High school: Anderson (Anderson, Indiana)
- College: Vanderbilt (1970–1973)
- NBA draft: 1973: 11th round, 166th overall pick
- Drafted by: Philadelphia 76ers
- Position: Small forward
- Number: 26

Career history
- 1973–1974: Philadelphia 76ers
- Stats at NBA.com
- Stats at Basketball Reference

Rodney Lee Freeman (born November 5, 1950) is an American former professional basketball small forward who played one season in the National Basketball Association (NBA) as a member of the Philadelphia 76ers during the 1973–74 season. He attended Vanderbilt University and in the 11th round of the 1973 NBA draft he was selected by the 76ers.

Three-year starter for HOF coach Ray Estes at Anderson, he set single-game scoring (38) and rebounding (28) records as part of 1,260 career points and a school-best 886 rebounds for the Indians. He averaged 23.3 points per game as a senior, was named a 1969 Indiana All-Star, and was also named 1st team all-state in football.

A three-year starter at Vanderbilt University, he was selected all-SEC as a sophomore after averaging 15.7 points per game. As a senior, he helped the Commodores to the #11 ranking in the nation.

Drafted by the NBA Philadelphia 76ers, ABA Memphis Tams, and NFL New York Giants. Freeman signed with the Giants. While in his inaugural training camp, he quit football and chose to play basketball, instead. Freeman returned the signing bonus that had been given to him by the Giants. He then began playing basketball for the 76ers.

== Career statistics ==
Legend
GP	Games played	GS	Games started	MPG	Minutes per game
FG%	Field goal percentage	3P%	3-point field goal percentage	FT%	Free throw percentage
RPG	Rebounds per game	APG	Assists per game	SPG	Steals per game
BPG	Blocks per game	PPG	Points per game	**Bold**	Career high

=== NBA ===
==== Regular season ====
Year	Team	GP	GS	MPG	FG%	FT%	RPG	APG	SPG	BPG	PPG
1973–74	Philadelphia	35	0	7.6	.379	.683	1.5	.4	.3	.0	3.0
