= 1973–74 Capital Bullets season =

NBA professional basketball team season

- Division champions
- Head coach: K. C. Jones
- General manager: Bob Ferry
- Owner: Abe Pollin
- Arena: Capital Centre; Cole Field House (until Dec)

Results
- Record: 47–35 (.573)
- Place: Division: 1st (Central); Conference: 3rd (Eastern)
- Playoff finish: Conference semifinals (lost to Knicks 3–4)
- Stats at Basketball Reference

Local media
- Television: WDCA
- Radio: WWDC (Frank Herzog)

The 1973–74 Capital Bullets season was the team's first in Washington, D.C. area, southwest from nearby Baltimore. Prior to the 1973–74 season, the Baltimore Bullets relocated to Landover, Maryland, a suburb east of Washington, and became the Capital Bullets. It was also their only season under the Capital Bullets name. They also rebranded their jerseys, eschewing the previous orange and blue look for red, white, and blue.

The Bullets finished with a 47–35 record and won the Central Division. Wes Unseld was limited to 56 games due to injuries. In the playoffs, the Bullets fell to the New York Knicks for the fifth time in six years, eliminated in seven games. Following the season, the team was renamed as the Washington Bullets.

The new Capital Centre opened on December 2, 1973; the Bullets played their earlier home games this season at Cole Field House at the University of Maryland in College Park. They played several home games at Cole during their last seasons in Baltimore.

== Draft picks ==
Round	Pick	Player	Position	Nationality	College
1	13	Nick Weatherspoon	F	United States	Illinois
2	19	Louie Nelson	G	United States	Washington
3	48	Tom Kozelko	F	United States	Toledo
4	65	Aron Stewart	G	United States	Richmond
5	82	Danny Traylor	C	United States	South Carolina
6	99	Mike Allocco	F	United States	Stonehill
7	116	Ronnie Hogue	G	United States	Georgia
8	133	Mark Jellison	G	United States	Northeastern
9	148	Mike Boylan	F	United States	Assumption
10	162	Dickie Kelly	G	United States	Bay CC
11	172	Dale Adams	F	United States	St. Mary's (Maryland)
12	181	Mike Battle	F	United States	George Washington
13	187	Chet Davis	G	United States	Morgan State
14	192	Howard White	G	United States	Maryland
15	197	Shorty Simmons	F	United States	St. Mary's (Maryland)

== Roster ==
Capital Bullets roster
Players

Pos.	No.	Player	Height	Weight	DOB	From
SG	45	Phil Chenier	6 ft 3 in (1.91 m)	180 lb (82 kg)	1950-10-30	California
PG	21	Archie Clark	6 ft 2 in (1.88 m)	175 lb (79 kg)	1941-07-15	Minnesota
PF	11	Elvin Hayes	6 ft 9 in (2.06 m)	235 lb (107 kg)	1945-11-17	Houston
PF	22	Tom Kozelko	6 ft 8 in (2.03 m)	220 lb (100 kg)	1951-07-01	Toledo
C	24	Manny Leaks	6 ft 8 in (2.03 m)	225 lb (102 kg)	1945-11-27	Niagara
SG	15	Louie Nelson	6 ft 3 in (1.91 m)	190 lb (86 kg)	1951-05-28	Washington
SF	30	Tom Patterson	6 ft 6 in (1.98 m)	220 lb (100 kg)	1948-10-15	Ouachita Baptist
PG	10	Kevin Porter	6 ft 0 in (1.83 m)	170 lb (77 kg)	1950-04-17	Saint Francis (PA)
SG	33	Rich Rinaldi	6 ft 3 in (1.91 m)	195 lb (88 kg)	1949-08-03	Saint Peter's College
SG	6	Mike Riordan	6 ft 4 in (1.93 m)	200 lb (91 kg)	1945-07-09	Providence
SF	42	Dave Stallworth	6 ft 7 in (2.01 m)	200 lb (91 kg)	1941-12-20	Wichita State
F	41	Wes Unseld	6 ft 7 in (2.01 m)	245 lb (111 kg)	1946-03-14	Louisville
F	12	Nick Weatherspoon	6 ft 7 in (2.01 m)	197 lb (89 kg)	1950-07-20	Illinois
C	31, 44	Walt Wesley	6 ft 11 in (2.11 m)	220 lb (100 kg)	1945-01-25	Kansas

Coaches
Head coach
- K. C. Jones
Assistant(s)
- Bernie Bickerstaff

Legend
- (DP) Unsigned draft pick
- (FA) Free agent
- (S) Suspended
- Injured

== Regular season ==
=== Season standings ===
Central Division	W	L	PCT	GB	Home	Road	Neutral	Div
y-Capital Bullets	47	35	.573	–	31–10	15–25	1–0	14–8
Atlanta Hawks	35	47	.427	12	23–18	12–25	0–4	13–9
Houston Rockets	32	50	.390	15	18–23	13–25	1–2	9–13
Cleveland Cavaliers	29	53	.354	18	18–23	11–28	0–2	8–14

#	Eastern Conference				
#	Team	W	L	PCT	GB
1	z-Boston Celtics	56	26	.683	–
2	x-New York Knicks	49	33	.598	7
3	y-Capital Bullets	47	35	.573	9
4	x-Buffalo Braves	42	40	.512	14
5	Atlanta Hawks	35	47	.427	21
6	Houston Rockets	32	50	.390	24
7	Cleveland Cavaliers	29	53	.354	27
8	Philadelphia 76ers	25	57	.305	31

== Game log ==
=== Preseason ===
1973 preseason game log
Total: 0–0 (home: 0–0; road: 0–0)
Preseason: 0–0 (home: 0–0; road: 0–0)

Game	Date	Team	Score	High points	High rebounds	High assists	Location Attendance	Record

1973–74 schedule

=== Regular season ===
1973–74 game log
Total: 47–35 (home: 31–10; road: 16–25)
October: 3–5 (home: 2–1; road: 1–4)

Game	Date	Team	Score	High points	High rebounds	High assists	Location Attendance	Record
1	October 9; 8:05 p.m. EDT	@ Atlanta	L 114–128	Riordan (26)	Hayes (12)	Chenier (4)	The Omni; 7,503	0–1
2	October 12; 11:00 p.m. EDT	@ Seattle	L 102–103	Hayes (27)	Stallworth (10)	Porter (12)	Seattle Center Coliseum; 11,673	0–2
3	October 13; 11:00 p.m. EDT	@ Portland	L 87–132	Chenier (21)	Hayes (14)	Hayes, Porter (5)	Memorial Coliseum; 9,502	0–3
4	October 19; 8:30 p.m. EDT	@ Chicago	L 103–117	Chenier (36)	Hayes (14)	Riordan (6)	Chicago Stadium; 3,000	0–4
5	October 20; 8:05 p.m. EDT	Boston	W 96–87	Chenier (26)	Hayes (23)	Porter (12)	Cole Field House; 7,711	1–4
6	October 21; 7:35 p.m. EDT	Chicago	L 99–107	Chenier (25)	Hayes (19)	Chenier (6)	Cole Field House; 7,641	1–5
7	October 23; 8:00 p.m. EDT	@ New York	W 101–84	Porter (27)	Hayes, Leaks (18)	Porter (5)	Madison Square Garden; 18,722	2–5
8	October 28; 7:35 p.m. EST	Philadelphia	W 119–99	Chenier (32)	Hayes (23)	Porter (7)	Cole Field House; 5,620	3–5

November: 8–4 (home: 3–3; road: 5–1)

Game	Date	Team	Score	High points	High rebounds	High assists	Location Attendance	Record
9	November 3; 2:40 p.m. EST	@ Philadelphia	W 112–84	Hayes (34)	Hayes (20)	Chenier (5)	The Spectrum; 5,112	4–5
10	November 4; 7:35 p.m. EST	Phoenix	W 102–99	Chenier, Riordan (25)	Hayes (19)	Porter (9)	Cole Field House; 5,316	5–5
11	November 7; 9:00 p.m. EST	@ Houston	W 111–97	Riordan (29)	Hayes (23)	Porter (13)	Hofheinz Pavilion; 2,758	6–5
12	November 9; 8:35 p.m. EST	@ Kansas City–Omaha (at Omaha, NE)	W 109–96	Riordan (29)	Hayes (15)	Porter (11)	Omaha Civic Auditorium; 4,182	6–6
13	November 11; 7:35 p.m. EST	Milwaukee	L 91–110	Hayes (26)	Hayes (16)	Porter (5)	Cole Field House; 11,638	7–6
14	November 17; 8:05 p.m. EST	@ Atlanta	W 115–109	Hayes (43)	Hayes (32)	Clark (9)	The Omni; 9,229	8–6
15	November 18; 7:35 p.m. EST	Buffalo	L 101–112	Porter (23)	Hayes (20)	Riordan (6)	Cole Field House; 6,134	8–7
16	November 21; 8:05 p.m. EST	Los Angeles	L 97–106	Chenier (30)	Hayes (25)	Porter (8)	Cole Field House; 8,841	8–8
17	November 23; 8:05 p.m. EST	Atlanta	W 101–86	Chenier, Hayes (20)	Hayes (18)	Clark, Porter (6)	Cole Field House; 9,046	9–8
18	November 25; 7:35 p.m. EST	New York	W 109–81	Chenier (26)	Hayes (13)	Porter (10)	Cole Field House; 11,855	10–8
19	November 28; 7:30 p.m. EST	@ Boston	L 104–111	Hayes (23)	Hayes (21)	Chenier, Clark, Porter (6)	Boston Garden; 6,810	10–9
20	November 30; 8:00 p.m. EST	@ Buffalo	W 121–113	Hayes (43)	Unseld (20)	Chenier (8)	Buffalo Memorial Auditorium; 6,118	11–9

December: 9–6 (home: 3–2; road: 6–4)

Game	Date	Team	Score	High points	High rebounds	High assists	Location Attendance	Record
21	December 2; 7:35 p.m. EST	Seattle	W 98–96	Hayes (36)	Hayes (29)	Chenier (5)	Capital Centre; 17,500	12–9
22	December 5; 9:00 p.m. EST	@ Houston	L 99–119	Hayes (23)	Hayes (14)	Clark (4)	Hofheinz Pavilion; 3,552	12–10
23	December 7; 9:00 p.m. EST	@ Phoenix	L 92–114	Hayes (23)	Hayes (10)	Porter (8)	Arizona Veterans Memorial Coliseum; 6,089	12–11
24	December 9; 10:00 p.m. EST	@ Los Angeles	W 110–96	Hayes (40)	Hayes (21)	Riordan (9)	The Forum; 12,958	13–11
25	December 11; 11:00 p.m. EST	@ Portland	W 87–82	Clark (24)	Hayes (16)	Clark (7)	Memorial Coliseum; 6,818	14–11
26	December 14; 11:00 p.m. EST	@ Seattle	L 88–93	Hayes (24)	Hayes (18)	Clark (7)	Seattle Center Coliseum; 11,857	14–12
27	December 15; 11:05 p.m. EST	@ Golden State	W 106–93	Riordan (33)	Hayes (22)	Clark (10)	Oakland–Alameda County Coliseum Arena; 6,217	15–12
28	December 18; 8:05 p.m. EST	Atlanta	L 91–98	Porter (23)	Hayes (24)	Clark (8)	Capital Centre; 9,135	15–13
29	December 20; 8:35 p.m. EST	@ Kansas City–Omaha	W 98–92	Chenier (22)	Hayes (15)	Clark, Porter, Riordan (4)	Kansas City Municipal Auditorium; 4,066	16–13
30	December 22br>8:05 p.m. EST	Houston	W 98–91	Weatherspoon (19)	Hayes (20)	Porter (8)	Capital Centre; 7,552	17–13
31	December 23; 8:00 p.m. EST	N Buffalo (at Toronto, ON)	W 110–85	Chenier (27)	Hayes (21)	Clark (10)	Maple Leaf Gardens; 7,112	18–13
32	December 25; 7:30 p.m. EST	@ New York	W 102–100	Clark (28)	Hayes (20)	Clark (5)	Madison Square Garden; 19,694	19–13
33	December 26; 8:05 p.m. EST	Chicago	W 82–81	Riordan (22)	Hayes (24)	Clark (11)	Capital Centre; 13,566	20–13
34	December 28; 7:35 p.m. EST	@ Detroit	L 93–102	Hayes (23)	Hayes (16)	Clark (6)	Cobo Arena; 6,930	20–14
35	December 29; 8:05 p.m. EST	Kansas City–Omaha	L 102–106	Chenier, Riordan (23)	Hayes (25)	Clark (6)	Capital Centre; 9,140	21–14

January: 7–8 (home: 6–2; road: 1–6)

Game	Date	Team	Score	High points	High rebounds	High assists	Location Attendance	Record
36	January 2; 8:05 p.m. EST	New York	L 81–92	Hayes (23)	Hayes (16)	Clark (4)	Capital Centre; 17,328	20–16
37	January 4; 8:00 p.m. EST	@ Cleveland	W 94–91	Hayes (31)	Hayes (15)	Porter (7)	Cleveland Arena; 3,431	21–16
38	January 5; 8:05 p.m. EST	Detroit	W 93–90	Chenier (28)	Unseld (18)	Unseld (7)	Capital Centre; 9,718	22–16
39	January 6; 7:35 p.m. EST	Milwaukee	W 90–88	Chenier (31)	Hayes (18)	Clark (7)	Capital Centre; 17,246	23–16
40	January 8; 8:05 p.m. EST	Los Angeles	W 94–92	Chenier (27)	Hayes (24)	Clark, Unseld (5)	Capital Centre; 12,048	24–16
41	January 11; 9:00 p.m. EST	@ Milwaukee	L 113–115 (OT)	Chenier (31)	Hayes (19)	Porter (7)	Milwaukee Arena; 9,683	24–17
42	January 12; 8:05 p.m. EST	Buffalo	L 96–97	Chenier (22)	Leaks (16)	Riordan (8)	Capital Centre; 12,206	24–18
All-Star Break
43	January 17; 8:05 p.m. EST	Cleveland	W 101–86	Chenier (26)	Hayes, Unseld (17)	Clark (8)	Capital Centre; 3,217	25–18
44	January 18; 8:00 p.m. EST	@ Buffalo	L 94–98	Hayes (43)	Hayes (23)	Clark, Riordan (4)	Buffalo Memorial Auditorium; 11,227	25–19
45	January 19; 8:05 p.m. EST	Golden State	W 117–90	Porter (22)	Hayes (17)	Hayes (6)	Capital Centre; 6,112	26–19
46	January 20; 7:35 p.m. EST	Houston	W 111–105	Riordan (27)	Hayes, Unseld (21)	Clark (9)	Capital Centre; 8,161	27–19
47	January 22; 11:05 p.m. EST	@ Golden State	L 97–99	Riordan (27)	Hayes (21)	Riordan (5)	Oakland–Alameda County Coliseum Arena; 4,023	27–20
48	January 25; 11:00 p.m. EST	@ Los Angeles	L 124–143	Clark (21)	Hayes (21)	Clark (5)	The Forum; 14,253	27–21
49	January 27; 9:00 p.m. EST	@ Phoenix	L 107–127	Chenier (26)	Hayes (16)	Clark (7)	Arizona Veterans Memorial Coliseum; 5,277	27–22
50	January 30; 8:30 p.m. EST	@ Chicago	L 94–103	Hayes (26)	Hayes (18)	Porter (6)	Chicago Stadium; 5,201	27–23

February: 11–6 (home: 8–1; road: 3–5)

Game	Date	Team	Score	High points	High rebounds	High assists	Location Attendance	Record
51	February 1; 8:00 p.m. EST	@ Cleveland	W 107–99	Chenier (38)	Hayes, Wesley (12)	Chenier, Porter (7)	Cleveland Arena; 3,735	28–23
52	February 3; 2:40 p.m. EST	@ Boston	W 112–99	Chenier (29)	Hayes (18)	Porter (3)	Boston Garden; 10,095	29–23
53	February 5; 8:05 p.m. EST	@ Atlanta	L 103–121	Hayes, Riordan (25)	Hayes (15)	Clark, Hayes (5)	The Omni; 6,265	29–24
54	February 6; 8:05 p.m. EST	Phoenix	W 109–101	Hayes (33)	Hayes (21)	Porter (12)	Capital Centre; 6,738	30–24
55	February 8; 9:00 p.m. EST	@ Milwaukee	L 96–105	Hayes (21)	Weatherspoon (18)	Porter (5)	Milwaukee Arena; 10,121	30–25
56	February 9; 8:05 p.m. EST	Philadelphia	W 108–75	Chenier (20)	Hayes (22)	Porter (8)	Capital Centre; 7,424	31–25
57	February 10; 1:35 p.m. EST	@ Philadelphia	L 94–95	Chenier (27)	Hayes (16)	Porter (8)	The Spectrum; 4,039	31–26
58	February 12; 8:00 p.m. EST	@ Cleveland	W 107–99	Porter (27)	Weatherspoon (19)	Chenier (6)	Cleveland Arena; 3,549	32–26
59	February 13; 8:05 p.m. EST	Kansas City–Omaha	W 89–87	Chenier (30)	Hayes (16)	Hayes, Porter (5)	Capital Centre; 5,842	33–26
60	February 16; 8:05 p.m. EST	Buffalo	W 101–92	Porter (27)	Hayes (21)	Porter (11)	Capital Centre; 12,651	34–26
61	February 17; 7:35 p.m. EST	Boston	W 99–95	Hayes (27)	Hayes (20)	Porter (7)	Capital Centre; 17,500	35–26
62	February 20; 8:05 p.m. EST	Portland	W 116–101	Porter (28)	Hayes (19)	Porter (12)	Capital Centre; 5,160	36–26
63	February 22; 7:35 p.m. EST	@ Detroit	L 83–84	Riordan (25)	Hayes (22)	Porter (11)	Cobo Arena; 9,049	36–27
64	February 23; 8:05 p.m. EST	Cleveland	L 101–104	Hayes (35)	Hayes (15)	Porter (16)	Capital Centre; 9,247	36–28
65	February 24; 7:35 p.m. EST	Detroit	W 94–84	Riordan (22)	Hayes (21)	Hayes, Riordan (7)	Capital Centre; 14,783	37–28
66	February 26; 7:30 p.m. EST	@ New York	L 71–85	Porter (17)	Hayes (17)	Porter (5)	Madison Square Garden; 19,694	37–29
67	February 27; 8:05 p.m. EST	Seattle	W 104–100	Chenier (25)	Hayes (27)	Porter (9)	Capital Centre; 5,140	38–29

March: 9–6 (home: 9–1; road: 0–5)

Game	Date	Team	Score	High points	High rebounds	High assists	Location Attendance	Record
68	March 1; 8:05 p.m. EST	New York	L 103–112	Chenier (30)	Hayes (14)	Porter (7)	Capital Centre; 17,500	38–30
69	March 3; 7:35 p.m. EST	Cleveland	W 98–93	Hayes (25)	Hayes (22)	Porter (7)	Capital Centre; 5,072	39–30
70	March 5; 8:05 p.m. EST	Atlanta	W 103–89	Porter (28)	Hayes (21)	Porter (9)	Capital Centre; 9,878	40–30
71	March 6; 8:05 p.m. EST	@ Philadelphia	L 99–112	Chenier (26)	Hayes (20)	Porter (6)	The Spectrum; 3,229	40–31
72	March 9; 8:05 p.m. EST	Portland	W 106–103	Chenier (30)	Hayes (16)	Porter (9)	Capital Centre; 5,116	41–31
73	March 10; 2:40 p.m. EST	Golden State	W 117–107	Chenier (33)	Hayes (16)	Chenier, Clark (6)	Capital Centre; 13,986	42–31
74	March 12; 8:05 p.m. EST	Philadelphia	W 112–101	Chenier (28)	Unseld (18)	Porter (7)	Capital Centre; 4,970	43–31
75	March 13; 9:00 p.m. EST	@ Houston	L 93–117	Chenier (19)	Unseld (10)	Porter, Unseld (7)	Hofheinz Pavilion; 4,153	43–32
76	March 15; 9:00 p.m. EST	@ Houston	L 105–114	Chenier, Hayes (20)	Hayes (12)	Porter (6)	Hofheinz Pavilion; 4,653	43–33
77	March 17; 8:00 p.m. EST	@ Boston	L 103–129	Porter (16)	Unseld (18)	Porter (6)	Boston Garden; 11,499	43–34
78	March 20; 8:05 p.m. EST	Cleveland	W 101–91	Hayes (34)	Hayes (16)	Unseld (7)	Capital Centre; 7,943	44–34
79	March 22; 8:05 p.m. EST	Houston	W 109–95	Hayes (31)	Hayes, Unseld (15)	Clark (10)	Capital Centre; 10,306	45–34
80	March 23; 8:05 p.m. EST	@ Atlanta	L 108–119 (OT)	Riordan (26)	Hayes (12)	Clark (7)	The Omni; 8,113	45–35
81	March 24; 3:00 p.m. EST	Atlanta	W 120–92	Porter (26)	Hayes (16)	Porter, Unseld (5)	Capital Centre; 11,766	46–35
82	March 26; 8:05 p.m. EST	Boston	W 126–108	Hayes (33)	Hayes, Unseld (17)	Porter (9)	Capital Centre; 11,449	47–35

1973–74 schedule

== Player stats ==
Note: GP=Games played; MP=Minutes Played; FG=Field Goals; FGA=Field Goal Attempts; FG%=Field Goal Percentage; FT=Free Throws; FTA=Free Throws Attempts; FT%=Free Throw Percentage; ORB=Offensive Rebounds; DRB=Defensive Rebounds; TRB=Total Rebounds; AST=Assists; STL=Steals; BLK=Blocks; PF=Personal Fouls; PTS=Points; AVG=Average

Player	GP	MP	FG	FGA	FG%	FT	FTA	FT%	ORB	DRB	TRB	AST	STL	BLK	PF	PTS	AVG
Hayes	81	3602	689	1627	.423	357	495	.721	354	1109	1463	163	86	240	252	1735	21.4
Chenier	76	2942	697	1607	.434	274	334	.820	114	274	388	239	155	67	135	1668	21.9
Riordan	81	3230	577	1223	.472	136	174	.782	120	260	380	264	102	14	237	1290	15.9
Porter	81	2339	477	997	.478	180	249	.723	79	100	179	469	95	9	319	1134	14.0
Clark	56	1786	315	675	.467	103	131	.786	44	97	141	285	59	6	122	733	13.1
Weatherspoon	65	1216	199	483	.412	96	139	.691	133	264	397	38	48	16	179	494	7.6
Unseld	56	1727	146	333	.438	36	55	.655	152	365	517	159	56	16	121	328	5.9
Nelson	49	556	93	215	.433	53	73	.726	26	44	70	52	31	2	62	239	4.9
Leaks	53	845	79	232	.341	58	83	.699	94	150	244	25	10	39	95	216	4.1
Stallworth	45	458	75	187	.401	47	55	.855	52	73	125	25	28	4	61	197	4.4
Wesley	39	400	71	151	.470	26	43	.605	63	73	136	14	9	20	74	168	4.3
Kozelko	49	573	59	133	.444	23	32	.719	52	72	124	25	21	7	82	141	2.9
Rinaldi	7	48	3	22	.136	3	4	.750	2	5	7	10	3	1	7	9	1.3
Patterson	2	8	0	1	.000	1	2	.500	1	1	2	2	0	0	0	1	0.5

== Team stats ==
Note: G=Games; MP=Minutes Played; FG=Field Goals; FGA=Field Goal Attempts; FG%=Field Goal Percentage; FT=Free Throws; FTA=Free Throw Attempts; FT%=Free Throw Percentage; ORB=Offensive Rebounds; DRB=Defensive Rebounds; TRB=Total Rebounds; AST=Assists; STL=Steals; BLK=Blocks; TOV=Turnovers; PF=Personal Fouls; PTS=Points

	G	MP	FG	FGA	FG%	FT	FTA	FT%	ORB	DRB	TRB	AST	STL	BLK	TOV	PF	PTS
Team	82	19730	3480	7886	.441	1393	1869	.745	1286	2887	4173	1770	703	441	1568	1746	8353
Team/G		240.6	42.4	96.2	.441	17.0	22.8	.745	15.7	35.2	50.9	21.6	8.6	5.4	19.1	21.3	101.9
Lg Rank		13	11	4	15	14	14	17	5	4	4	16	11	5	3	1	14
Year/Year		0.0%	-4.8%	0.0%	-.022	7.7%	7.3	+.002			-0.8%	-13.7%				4.4%	-2.9%
Opponent	82	19730	3496	7760	.451	1239	1639	.756	1206	2915	4121	1900	651	350	1651	1840	8231
Opponent/G		240.6	42.6	94.6	.451	15.1	20.0	.756	14.7	35.5	50.3	23.2	7.9	4.3	20.1	22.4	100.4
Lg Rank		13	6	11	6	1	1	2	10	15	15	3	5	5	12	14	5
Year/Year		0.0%	-1.0%	-3.1%	+.010	-2.4%	-3.7%	+.010			-2.5%	2.6%				9.4%	-1.2%

== Playoffs ==
1974 playoff game log
Eastern Conference semifinals: 3–4 (home: 2–1; road: 1–3)

Game	Date	Team	Score	High points	High rebounds	High assists	Location Attendance	Series
1	March 29; 8:30 p.m. EST	@ New York	L 91–102	Hayes (40)	Hayes (14)	Hayes, Porter (4)	Madison Square Garden; 19,694	0–1
2	March 31; 2:30 p.m. EST	New York	W 99–87	Chenier (35)	Hayes (21)	Porter (7)	Capital Centre; 16,522	1–1
3	April 2; 8:30 p.m. EST	@ New York	W 88–79	Porter (22)	Hayes (13)	Porter (5)	Madison Square Garden; 19,694	2–1
4	April 5; 9:05 p.m. EST	New York	L 93–101 (OT)	Hayes, Porter (20)	Hayes (17)	Porter (7)	Capital Centre; 19,035	2–2
5	April 7; 1:00 p.m. EST	@ New York	L 105–106	Hayes (27)	Unseld (12)	Unseld (8)	Madison Square Garden; 19,694	2–3
6	April 10; 9:05 p.m. EST	New York	W 109–92	Hayes (31)	Hayes (23)	Unseld (5)	Capital Centre; 19,025	3–3
7	April 12; 9:00 p.m. EST	@ New York	L 81–91	Chenier (21)	Chenier (14)	Hayes (5)	Madison Square Garden; 19,694	3–4

1974 schedule

== Playoffs player stats ==
Note: GP=Games played; MP=Minutes Played; FG=Field Goals; FGA=Field Goal Attempts; FG%=Field Goal Percentage; FT=Free Throws; FTA=Free Throw Attempts; FT%=Free Throw Percentage; ORB=Offensive Rebounds; DRB=Defensive Rebounds; TRB=Total Rebounds; AST=Assists; STL=Steals; BLK=Blocks; PF=Personal Fouls; PTS=Points; AVG=Average

Player	GP	MP	FG	FGA	FG%	FT	FTA	FT%	ORB	DRB	TRB	AST	STL	BLK	PF	PTS	AVG
Hayes	7	323	76	143	.531	29	41	.701	31	80	111	21	5	15	23	181	25.9
Chenier	7	310	62	137	.453	33	37	.892	6	37	43	12	13	8	19	157	22.4
Riordan	7	267	36	87	.414	14	16	.875	7	17	24	17	4	2	28	86	12.3
Porter	7	195	33	85	.388	9	14	.643	10	7	17	32	8	0	30	75	10.7
Unseld	7	297	31	63	.492	9	15	.600	22	63	85	27	4	1	15	71	10.1
Clark	7	162	20	59	.339	11	20	.550	3	10	13	15	5	0	13	51	7.3
Kozelko	7	58	10	13	.769	3	4	.750	4	4	8	1	0	0	10	23	3.3
Weatherspoon	7	9	19	.474	2	5	.400	11	16	27	0	2	2	11	20	2.9	
Leaks	2	5	1	2	.500	0	0		1	1	2	0	0	0	1	2	1.0
Wesley	1	1	0	0		0	0		0	0	0	0	0	0	0	0	0.0

== Awards and honors ==
- Elvin Hayes, All-NBA Second Team
- Nick Weatherspoon, NBA All-Rookie Team 1st Team
