= Tom Patterson (basketball) =

American basketball player

Personal information
- Born: October 15, 1948 Midland, Texas, U.S.
- Died: February, 1982 (aged 33)
- Listed height: 6 ft 6 in (1.98 m)
- Listed weight: 220 lb (100 kg)

Career information
- High school: Lincoln (Camden, Arkansas)
- College: Ouachita Baptist (1966–1967, 1970–1972)
- NBA draft: 1972: 2nd round, 25th overall pick
- Drafted by: Baltimore Bullets
- Playing career: 1972–1973
- Position: Small forward / power forward
- Number: 30

Career history
- 1972–1973: Baltimore / Capital Bullets

Career highlights
- NAIA All-American (1972); 2× All-AIC (1971, 1972)
- Stats at NBA.com
- Stats at Basketball Reference

Tommie J. Patterson (October 15, 1948 – February 1982) was an American professional basketball forward who played two seasons in the National Basketball Association (NBA) as a member of the Baltimore/Capital Bullets (1972–74). He attended Ouachita Baptist University, leaving college after his freshman season to enroll in the US Army for three years, before returning to Ouchita Baptist. Patterson was selected by the Bullets in the second round of the 1972 NBA draft as the 25th overall selection.

== Career ==
Born in Midland, Texas, Patterson graduated from Lincoln High School in Camden, Arkansas in 1966. He enrolled at nearby Ouachita Baptist University, in Arkadelphia, Arkansas in the fall of 1966, playing basketball for Coach Bill Vining. Patterson was a classmate of NFL All-Pro Cliff Harris at Ouachita Baptist, then an NAIA college. However, after his freshman year, Patterson joined the U.S. Army, where he subsequently served three years, including one year of duty in Vietnam. When he finished his service with the US Army, Patterson returned to Ouachita Baptist in the fall of 1970 and rejoined the basketball team.

Returning to Ouachita Baptist in 1970, Patterson averaged 20.5 points and 12.5 rebounds in 1970-1971 under Coach Vining. In 1971–1972, Patterson averaged 25.3 points and 14.7 rebounds as Ouachita Baptist advanced to the second round of the 1972 NAIA men's basketball tournament. For his college career he averaged 23.1 points, 13.8 rebounds, shooting 52.2% from the field and 73.5% from the foul line.

As he had originally enrolled in college in 1966, Patterson was eligible for the 1972 NBA draft, held on April 10, 1972. A 6'6" power forward, Patterson was selected by the Baltimore Bullets in the second round with the 25th overall pick. The Bullets had received the draft pick spot earlier in the day in a trade with the Phoenix Suns for eventual Naismith Basketball Hall of Fame inductee Gus Johnson.

In his rookie season with the Bullets, Patterson averaged 2.4 points and 1.0 rebounds, averaging four minutes in 29 games. He played under Coach Gene Shue and alongside Hall of Fame inductees Wes Unseld and Elvin Hayes. The Bullets won the Central Division with a record of 52-30 and were eliminated by the eventual NBA Champion New York Knicks in the first round of the NBA Playoffs. Patterson played sparingly in the playoffs.

Patterson played in only two games for the Bullets in the 1973–1974 season, before being waived on November 26, 1973.

Patterson played with the New York Nets of the American Basketball Association in the 1974-1975 pre-season under Coach kevin Loughery. The Nets were defending ABA Champions. Patterson played alongside Hall of Famer Julius Erving with the Nets, but Patterson was cut and did not appear in a regular season game.

== Personal ==
Patterson died in February 1982, at age 33.

== Career statistics ==
Legend
| GP | Games played | GS | Games started | MPG | Minutes per game |
| FG% | Field goal percentage | 3P% | 3-point field goal percentage | FT% | Free throw percentage |
| RPG | Rebounds per game | APG | Assists per game | SPG | Steals per game |
| BPG | Blocks per game | PPG | Points per game | **Bold** | Career high |

=== NBA ===
==== Regular season ====
| Year | Team | GP | MPG | FG% | FT% | RPG | APG | SPG | BPG | PPG |
|---|---|---|---|---|---|---|---|---|---|---|
| 1972–73 | Baltimore | **23** | **4.0** | **.429** | **.813** | **1.0** | .1 | | | **2.4** |
| 1973–74 | Capital | 2 | **4.0** | .000 | .500 | **1.0** | **1.0** | .0 | .0 | .5 |
| Career | | 25 | 4.0 | .420 | .778 | 1.0 | .2 | .0 | .0 | 2.2 |

==== Playoffs ====
| Year | Team | GP | MPG | FG% | FT% | RPG | APG | PPG |
|---|---|---|---|---|---|---|---|---|
| 1973 | Baltimore | 1 | 1.0 | – | – | .0 | .0 | .0 |

== Honors ==
- Patterson was inducted into the Ouachita Baptist University Athletics Hall of Fame in 2015. His daughter Kelana was present to represent Patterson for his induction.
