= 1973–74 Los Angeles Lakers season =

NBA professional basketball team season

- Division champions
- Head coach: Bill Sharman
- Arena: The Forum

Results
- Record: 47–35 (.573)
- Place: Division: 1st (Pacific); Conference: 2nd (Western)
- Playoff finish: Conference semifinals (lost to Bucks 1–4)
- Stats at Basketball Reference

Local media
- Television: KTLA
- Radio: KFI (Chick Hearn, Lynn Shackelford)

The 1973–74 Los Angeles Lakers season was the Lakers' 26th season in the NBA and 14th season in Los Angeles. Having lost to the New York Knicks in the previous season's NBA Finals, the Lakers would make it to the NBA Playoffs, posting a 47–35 record, only to lose to the Milwaukee Bucks in five games. For the first time since 1967-68 Wilt Chamberlain was not on the team as he retired.

Following the season, Jerry West retired after 14 seasons with the Lakers. He would later return to the Lakers as the head coach from 1976 to 1979, then served as general manager from 1982 to 2000.

== Roster ==
1973–74 Los Angeles Lakers roster
Players

Pos.	No.	Player	Height	Weight	DOB	From
F/C	32	Bill Bridges	6 ft 6 in (1.98 m)	228 lb (103 kg)		Kansas
C	31	Mel Counts	7 ft 0 in (2.13 m)	230 lb (104 kg)	1941-10-16	Oregon State
G	25	Gail Goodrich	6 ft 1 in (1.85 m)	170 lb (77 kg)	1943-04-23	UCLA
F	52	Happy Hairston	6 ft 7 in (2.01 m)	255 lb (116 kg)	1942-05-31	NYU
F/C	42	Connie Hawkins	6 ft 8 in (2.03 m)	210 lb (95 kg)	1942-07-17	Iowa
G/F	32	Nate Hawthorne	6 ft 4 in (1.93 m)	190 lb (86 kg)	1950-01-15	Southern Illinois
F	34	Stan Love	6 ft 9 in (2.06 m)	215 lb (98 kg)		Oregon
PG	15	Jim Price	6 ft 3 in (1.91 m)	195 lb (88 kg)		Louisville
G	12	Pat Riley	6 ft 4 in (1.93 m)	205 lb (93 kg)	1945-03-20	Kentucky
C	3	Elmore Smith	7 ft 0 in (2.13 m)	250 lb (113 kg)	1949-05-09	Kentucky State
F	24	Kermit Washington	6 ft 8 in (2.03 m)	230 lb (104 kg)	1951-09-17	American
G	44	Jerry West	6 ft 2 in (1.88 m)	175 lb (79 kg)	1938-05-28	West Virginia

Coaches
Head coach
- Bill Sharman

Legend
- (DP) Unsigned draft pick
- (FA) Free agent
- (S) Suspended
- Injured

== Regular season ==
=== Season standings ===
Pacific Division	W	L	PCT	GB	Home	Road	Neutral	Div
y-Los Angeles Lakers	47	35	.573	–	30–11	17–24	–	14–12
Golden State Warriors	44	38	.537	3	23–18	20–20	1–0	15–11
Seattle SuperSonics	36	46	.439	11	22–19	14–27	–	12–14
Phoenix Suns	30	52	.366	17	24–17	6–34	0–1	11–15
Portland Trail Blazers	27	55	.329	20	22–19	5–34	0–2	13–13

#	Western Conference				
#	Team	W	L	PCT	GB
1	z-Milwaukee Bucks	59	23	.720	–
2	x-Chicago Bulls	54	28	.659	5
3	x-Detroit Pistons	52	30	.634	7
4	y-Los Angeles Lakers	47	35	.573	12
5	Golden State Warriors	44	38	.537	15
6	Seattle SuperSonics	36	46	.439	23
7	Kansas City–Omaha Kings	33	49	.402	26
8	Phoenix Suns	30	52	.366	29
9	Portland Trail Blazers	27	55	.329	32

z – clinched division title
y – clinched division title
x – clinched playoff spot

=== Game log ===
1973–74 game log
#	Date	Opponent	Score	High points	Record
1	October 9	@ Chicago	117–97	Jerry West (28)	1–0
2	October 11	@ Atlanta	102–129	Gail Goodrich (23)	1–1
3	October 13	@ Buffalo	125–122	Jerry West (35)	2–1
4	October 19	Seattle	91–118	Gail Goodrich (28)	3–1
5	October 21	Atlanta	119–100	Jerry West (22)	3–2
6	October 23	@ Houston	107–98	Gail Goodrich (29)	4–2
7	October 24	@ Kansas City–Omaha	92–91	Bill Bridges (28)	5–2
8	October 26	Detroit	92–94	Gail Goodrich (34)	6–2
9	October 28	Portland	98–111	Gail Goodrich (49)	7–2
10	October 30	@ Portland	112–114	Gail Goodrich (35)	7–3
11	November 2	New York	106–91	Gail Goodrich (26)	7–4
12	November 4	Houston	93–106	Jerry West (30)	8–4
13	November 6	@ Cleveland	96–115	Jerry West (21)	8–5
14	November 7	@ Milwaukee	92–109	Happy Hairston (19)	8–6
15	November 9	@ Seattle	118–111	Gail Goodrich (36)	9–6
16	November 16	Chicago	102–118	Gail Goodrich (38)	10–6
17	November 17	@ Phoenix	130–110	Happy Hairston (25)	11–6
18	November 18	Cleveland	100–102	Gail Goodrich (30)	12–6
19	November 20	@ New York	89–105	Price, Smith (20)	12–7
20	November 21	@ Capital	106–97	Gail Goodrich (24)	13–7
21	November 24	@ Portland	113–108	Gail Goodrich (33)	14–7
22	November 25	Portland	109–137	Gail Goodrich (40)	15–7
23	November 30	Kansas City–Omaha	107–123	Gail Goodrich (30)	16–7
24	December 1	@ Portland	115–134	Jerry West (26)	16–8
25	December 2	Detroit	114–108	Gail Goodrich (29)	16–9
26	December 4	Phoenix	103–120	Jerry West (26)	17–9
27	December 7	Seattle	115–111	Jerry West (27)	17–10
28	December 8	@ Golden State	111–135	Connie Hawkins (23)	17–11
29	December 9	Capital	110–96	Jim Price (18)	17–12
30	December 11	@ Cleveland	100–101 (OT)	Jerry West (32)	17–13
31	December 12	@ Detroit	96–114	Gail Goodrich (31)	17–14
32	December 14	@ Chicago	100–97	Gail Goodrich (29)	18–14
33	December 16	Boston	115–110	Gail Goodrich (24)	18–15
34	December 18	Milwaukee	107–109	Gail Goodrich (40)	19–15
35	December 21	Philadelphia	107–116	Gail Goodrich (27)	20–15
36	December 25	@ Phoenix	100–135	Pat Riley (17)	20–16
37	December 26	@ Seattle	105–129	Gail Goodrich (26)	20–17
38	December 28	Phoenix	107–119	Connie Hawkins (26)	21–17
39	December 29	@ Golden State	100–102	Gail Goodrich (37)	21–18
40	December 30	Buffalo	105–108	Jim Price (27)	22–18
41	January 4	Golden State	111–114	Gail Goodrich (29)	23–18
42	January 6	Kansas City–Omaha	105–109	Gail Goodrich (28)	24–18
43	January 8	@ Capital	92–94	Gail Goodrich (27)	24–19
44	January 9	@ Detroit	94–123	Pat Riley (20)	24–20
45	January 11	@ Boston	111–103	Goodrich, Hawkins (22)	25–20
46	January 12	@ Philadelphia	108–101	Gail Goodrich (23)	26–20
47	January 18	@ Kansas City–Omaha	116–115	Gail Goodrich (28)	27–20
48	January 20	@ Milwaukee	90–94	Gail Goodrich (29)	27–21
49	January 22	Cleveland	111–110 (OT)	Jim Price (24)	27–22
50	January 25	Capital	124–143	Gail Goodrich (41)	28–22
51	January 27	Milwaukee	92–99	Jim Price (20)	29–22
52	February 1	Phoenix	110–121	Gail Goodrich (29)	30–22
53	February 2	@ Phoenix	112–119	Jerry West (24)	30–23
54	February 3	Portland	91–124	Jim Price (24)	31–23
55	February 5	@ Houston	112–116 (OT)	Gail Goodrich (44)	31–24
56	February 6	@ Atlanta	103–107	Gail Goodrich (28)	31–25
57	February 10	@ Chicago	86–96	Gail Goodrich (24)	31–26
58	February 12	Houston	129–119	Jim Price (28)	31–27
59	February 15	Seattle	96–112	Gail Goodrich (28)	32–27
60	February 17	Atlanta	113–110	Gail Goodrich (35)	32–28
61	February 19	@ Kansas City–Omaha	86–92	Happy Hairston (23)	32–29
62	February 20	@ Detroit	110–112	Jim Price (31)	32–30
63	February 22	Philadelphia	103–104	Connie Hawkins (26)	33–30
64	February 23	@ Seattle	118–116	Gail Goodrich (28)	34–30
65	February 24	Chicago	90–100	Gail Goodrich (28)	35–30
66	February 26	@ Buffalo	119–112	Gail Goodrich (25)	36–30
67	February 27	@ Milwaukee	110–108	Happy Hairston (22)	37–30
68	March 1	Kansas City–Omaha	100–107	Gail Goodrich (26)	38–30
69	March 3	Golden State	104–108	Jim Price (26)	39–30
70	March 5	@ Portland	102–107	Happy Hairston (19)	39–31
71	March 6	Boston	111–116	Gail Goodrich (39)	40–31
72	March 8	Detroit	113–129	Goodrich, Price (31)	41–31
73	March 10	@ Boston	82–94	Gail Goodrich (19)	41–32
74	March 12	@ New York	109–102	Gail Goodrich (34)	42–32
75	March 13	@ Philadelphia	121–100	Gail Goodrich (38)	43–32
76	March 15	Golden State	112–107	Elmore Smith (25)	43–33
77	March 16	@ Golden State	105–135	Elmore Smith (25)	43–34
78	March 17	New York	114–126	Jim Price (25)	44–34
79	March 20	Milwaukee	114–120	Gail Goodrich (27)	45–34
80	March 22	Chicago	93–99	Elmore Smith (29)	46–34
81	March 24	Buffalo	124–150	Elmore Smith (37)	47–34
82	March 26	Seattle	121–115	Gail Goodrich (21)	47–35

== Playoffs ==
1974 playoff game log
Conference semifinals: 1–4 (home: 1–1; road: 0–3)

Game	Date	Team	Score	High points	High rebounds	High assists	Location Attendance	Series
1	March 29	@ Milwaukee	L 95–99	Gail Goodrich (31)	Connie Hawkins (14)	Gail Goodrich (6)	Milwaukee Arena; 10,938	0–1
2	March 31	@ Milwaukee	L 90–109	Gail Goodrich (21)	Happy Hairston (10)	Happy Hairston (7)	Milwaukee Arena; 10,938	0–2
3	April 2	Milwaukee	W 98–96	Elmore Smith (30)	Elmore Smith (17)	Gail Goodrich (12)	The Forum; 17,505	1–2
4	April 4	Milwaukee	L 90–112	Elmore Smith (20)	Elmore Smith (13)	Connie Hawkins (5)	The Forum	1–3
5	April 7	@ Milwaukee	L 92–114	Gail Goodrich (22)	Happy Hairston (11)	Gail Goodrich (6)	Milwaukee Arena; 10,938	1–4

1974 schedule

== Awards and records ==
- Gail Goodrich, All-NBA First Team
- Gail Goodrich, NBA All-Star Game
- Jerry West, NBA All-Star Game
