= 1973–74 Philadelphia 76ers season =

Season of National Basketball Association team the Philadelphia 76ers

- Head coach: Gene Shue
- Arena: The Spectrum

Results
- Record: 25–57 (.305)
- Place: Division: 4th (Atlantic); Conference: 8th (Eastern)
- Playoff finish: Did not qualify
- Stats at Basketball Reference

Local media
- Television: WTAF-TV
- Radio: WCAU (Bill Campbell)

The 1973–74 Philadelphia 76ers season was the 76ers 25th season in the NBA & 11th season in Philadelphia. The team improved from a league history worst 9 wins to 25 wins, thanks to a fruitful 1973 NBA draft which yielded overall #1 pick Doug Collins. Eventual 76er mainstays George McGinnis and Caldwell Jones were also selected by the team, but both would opt for the ABA.

Fred Carter was the team's leading scorer who averaged over 20 points a game & Doug Collins was a rookie on this squad who was the #1 overall draft choice from Illinois State in the 1973 draft.

== Offseason ==
=== Draft picks ===
This table only displays picks through the second round.

Round	Pick	Player	Position	Nationality	College
1	1	Doug Collins	SG	United States	Illinois State
1	18	Raymond Lewis	G	United States	Cal State LA
2	21	Allan Bristow	SF/SG	United States	Virginia Tech
2	22	George McGinnis	PF/C	United States	Indiana
2	32	Caldwell Jones	C/PF	United States	Albany State

== Roster ==
Philadelphia 76ers roster
Players

Pos.	No.	Player	Height	Weight	DOB	From
G	11	Freddie Boyd	6 ft 2 in (1.88 m)	180 lb (82 kg)		Oregon State
F	44	Allan Bristow	6 ft 7 in (2.01 m)	210 lb (95 kg)		Virginia Tech
G	3	Fred Carter	6 ft 3 in (1.91 m)	185 lb (84 kg)		Mount St. Mary's
G	20	Doug Collins	6 ft 6 in (1.98 m)	180 lb (82 kg)		Illinois State
C	25	Leroy Ellis	6 ft 10 in (2.08 m)	210 lb (95 kg)		St. John's
F	26	Rod Freeman	6 ft 7 in (2.01 m)	225 lb (102 kg)		Vanderbilt
F	7	Toby Kimball	6 ft 6 in (1.98 m)	220 lb (100 kg)		Connecticut
G	34	Don May	6 ft 4 in (1.93 m)	220 lb (100 kg)		Dayton
F	50	Steve Mix	6 ft 7 in (2.01 m)	215 lb (98 kg)		Toledo
C	42	Luther Rackley	6 ft 10 in (2.08 m)	220 lb (100 kg)		Xavier
G/F	5	Tom Van Arsdale	6 ft 5 in (1.96 m)	202 lb (92 kg)		Indiana

Coaches
Head coach
- Gene Shue

Legend
- (DP) Unsigned draft pick
- (FA) Free agent
- (S) Suspended
- Injured

== Regular season ==
=== Season standings ===
Atlantic Division	W	L	PCT	GB	Home	Road	Neutral	Div
y-Boston Celtics	56	26	.683	–	26–6	21–18	9–2	17–5
x-New York Knicks	49	33	.598	7	28–13	21–19	0–1	10–12
x-Buffalo Braves	42	40	.512	14	19–13	17–21	6–6	12–10
Philadelphia 76ers	25	57	.305	31	14–23	9–30	2–4	5–17

#	Eastern Conference				
#	Team	W	L	PCT	GB
1	z-Boston Celtics	56	26	.683	–
2	x-New York Knicks	49	33	.598	7
3	y-Capital Bullets	47	35	.573	9
4	x-Buffalo Braves	42	40	.512	14
5	Atlanta Hawks	35	47	.427	21
6	Houston Rockets	32	50	.390	24
7	Cleveland Cavaliers	29	53	.354	27
8	Philadelphia 76ers	25	57	.305	31

z – clinched division title
y – clinched division title
x – clinched playoff spot

=== Game log ===
1973–74 Game log
#	Date	Opponent	Score	High points	Record
1	October 10	Houston	104–88	Fred Boyd (17)	0–1
2	October 13	Boston	111–106	Tom Van Arsdale (25)	0–2
3	October 16	@ Houston	106–101	Fred Carter (29)	1–2
4	October 19	@ Boston	102–133	Tom Van Arsdale (28)	1–3
5	October 20	@ Buffalo	110–116	Tom Van Arsdale (35)	1–4
6	October 24	Portland	110–132	Steve Mix (38)	2–4
7	October 26	Milwaukee	98–92	Carter, Van Arsdale (19)	2–5
8	October 27	@ New York	90–96	Fred Carter (19)	2–6
9	October 28	@ Capital	99–119	Fred Carter (23)	2–7
10	November 3	Capital	112–84	Tom Van Arsdale (17)	2–8
11	November 7	Phoenix	115–122	Fred Carter (32)	3–8
12	November 9	New York	91–94	Fred Carter (28)	4–8
13	November 10	@ Atlanta	97–120	LeRoy Ellis (18)	4–9
14	November 13	@ Houston	83–97	Tom Van Arsdale (17)	4–10
15	November 15	@ Phoenix	94–116	Fred Carter (24)	4–11
16	November 17	@ Golden State	109–106	Tom Van Arsdale (25)	5–11
17	November 18	@ Seattle	91–95	LeRoy Ellis (17)	5–12
18	November 20	@ Kansas City–Omaha	109–103	Tom Van Arsdale (28)	6–12
19	November 21	@ Kansas City–Omaha	103–90	Tom Van Arsdale (28)	7–12
20	November 23	N Golden State	106–111	Tom Van Arsdale (27)	7–13
21	November 25	@ Milwaukee	96–105	Steve Mix (17)	7–14
22	November 28	Chicago	96–101	Fred Carter (29)	8–14
23	November 30	@ Cleveland	110–112	Tom Van Arsdale (29)	8–15
24	December 1	Houston	106–108 (OT)	Ellis, Mix (24)	9–15
25	December 5	Cleveland	89–75	Larry Jones (16)	9–16
26	December 6	@ Chicago	98–103	Fred Carter (30)	9–17
27	December 7	Kansas City–Omaha	113–102	Jones, Van Arsdale (20)	9–18
28	December 8	Milwaukee	105–92	Fred Carter (24)	9–19
29	December 12	Seattle	100–93	Fred Carter (22)	9–20
30	December 14	@ Detroit	96–93	Fred Carter (23)	10–20
31	December 15	Detroit	99–89	Fred Carter (16)	10–21
32	December 19	@ Phoenix	101–98	Steve Mix (23)	11–21
33	December 21	@ Los Angeles	107–116	Fred Carter (28)	11–22
34	December 22	@ Portland	105–110	Fred Carter (27)	11–23
35	December 26	@ Atlanta	118–145	Fred Carter (25)	11–24
36	December 27	@ Milwaukee	107–129	Fred Carter (26)	11–25
37	December 29	@ New York	92–112	Fred Carter (23)	11–26
38	December 31	@ Boston	97–106	Tom Van Arsdale (27)	11–27
39	January 2	Houston	101–99	Fred Carter (20)	11–28
40	January 4	New York	75–78	Fred Carter (17)	12–28
41	January 5	N Boston	102–108 (OT)	Tom Van Arsdale (34)	12–29
42	January 9	Cleveland	86–90	Steve Mix (24)	13–29
43	January 11	N Atlanta	121–100	Fred Carter (30)	14–29
44	January 12	Los Angeles	108–101	Fred Carter (24)	14–30
45	January 13	@ Cleveland	94–96	Boyd, Carter (24)	14–31
46	January 18	Seattle	116–104	Steve Mix (19)	14–32
47	January 20	Buffalo	112–129	Don May (28)	15–32
48	January 22	@ Buffalo	109–119	Steve Mix (27)	15–33
49	January 25	@ Boston	97–112	Tom Van Arsdale (32)	15–34
50	January 26	@ New York	98–122	Tom Van Arsdale (26)	15–35
51	February 1	N Boston	105–106	Fred Carter (28)	15–36
52	February 2	Chicago	105–89	Steve Mix (21)	15–37
53	February 3	N Buffalo	98–112	Steve Mix (24)	15–38
54	February 6	Buffalo	114–98	Fred Carter (27)	15–39
55	February 8	Atlanta	84–104	Carter, Van Arsdale (22)	16–39
56	February 9	@ Capital	75–108	Fred Carter (15)	16–40
57	February 10	Capital	94–95	Fred Carter (22)	17–40
58	February 11	@ Atlanta	116–95	Tom Van Arsdale (35)	18–40
59	February 13	Buffalo	129–106	Tom Van Arsdale (29)	18–41
60	February 15	Kansas City–Omaha	89–92	Fred Carter (26)	19–41
61	February 17	Detroit	118–107	Steve Mix (27)	19–42
62	February 20	@ Houston	98–115	Tom Van Arsdale (20)	19–43
63	February 22	@ Los Angeles	103–104	Fred Carter (22)	19–44
64	February 23	@ Golden State	106–125	Fred Carter (22)	19–45
65	February 24	@ Seattle	105–115	Tom Van Arsdale (26)	19–46
66	February 26	@ Portland	118–110	Tom Van Arsdale (29)	20–46
67	March 1	Cleveland	110–93	Tom Van Arsdale (25)	20–47
68	March 2	Buffalo	103–99	Fred Carter (35)	20–48
69	March 6	Capital	99–112	Steve Mix (27)	21–48
70	March 8	Golden State	106–96	Steve Mix (23)	21–49
71	March 10	New York	108–109	Fred Carter (34)	22–49
72	March 12	@ Capital	101–112	Fred Carter (23)	22–50
73	March 13	Los Angeles	121–100	Ellis, Van Arsdale (18)	22–51
74	March 15	N Phoenix	101–108	Steve Mix (27)	23–51
75	March 16	Boston	146–127	Fred Carter (31)	23–52
76	March 17	@ Cleveland	99–115	Tom Van Arsdale (23)	23–53
77	March 19	@ Chicago	94–103	Tom Van Arsdale (25)	23–54
78	March 20	Portland	113–106	Fred Carter (24)	23–55
79	March 22	Atlanta	107–106	Tom Van Arsdale (25)	23–56
80	March 23	@ Detroit	97–89	Tom Van Arsdale (25)	24–56
81	March 26	@ New York	90–117	Fred Carter (18)	24–57
82	March 27	Boston	108–117	Fred Carter (31)	25–57
