= 1973–74 Houston Rockets season =

- Head coach: Johnny Egan
- General manager: Ray Patterson
- Owner: Irvin Kaplan
- Arena: Hofheinz Pavilion

Results
- Record: 32–50 (.390)
- Place: Division: 3rd (Central); Conference: 6th (Eastern)
- Playoff finish: Did not qualify
- Stats at Basketball Reference

Local media
- Television: KHTV
- Radio: KPRC

The 1973–74 Houston Rockets season was the Rockets' 7th season in the NBA and 3rd season in the city of Houston.

== Roster ==
Houston Rockets roster
Players

Pos.	No.	Player	Height	Weight	DOB	From
F	44	E. C. Coleman	6 ft 8 in (2.03 m)	225 lb (102 kg)		Houston Baptist
C	20	Kevin Kunnert	6 ft 9 in (2.06 m)	230 lb (104 kg)		Iowa
G	23	Calvin Murphy	5 ft 9 in (1.75 m)	165 lb (75 kg)		Niagara
G	14	Mike Newlin	6 ft 4 in (1.93 m)	200 lb (91 kg)		Utah
F	42	Ed Ratleff	6 ft 6 in (1.98 m)	195 lb (88 kg)		Long Beach State
F	31	Ron Riley	6 ft 8 in (2.03 m)	195 lb (88 kg)		USC
F	45	Rudy Tomjanovich	6 ft 8 in (2.03 m)	218 lb (99 kg)		Michigan
G	11	Dave Wohl	6 ft 2 in (1.88 m)	185 lb (84 kg)		Penn

Coaches
Head coach
- Johnny Egan
Assistant(s)
- Larry Siegfried

Legend
- (DP) Unsigned draft pick
- (FA) Free agent
- (S) Suspended
- Injured

== Regular season ==
=== Season standings ===
Central Division	W	L	PCT	GB	Home	Road	Neutral	Div
y-Capital Bullets	47	35	.573	–	31–10	15–25	1–0	14–8
Atlanta Hawks	35	47	.427	12	23–18	12–25	0–4	13–9
Houston Rockets	32	50	.390	15	18–23	13–25	1–2	9–13
Cleveland Cavaliers	29	53	.354	18	18–23	11–28	0–2	8–14

#	Eastern Conference				
#	Team	W	L	PCT	GB
1	z-Boston Celtics	56	26	.683	–
2	x-New York Knicks	49	33	.598	7
3	y-Capital Bullets	47	35	.573	9
4	x-Buffalo Braves	42	40	.512	14
5	Atlanta Hawks	35	47	.427	21
6	Houston Rockets	32	50	.390	24
7	Cleveland Cavaliers	29	53	.354	27
8	Philadelphia 76ers	25	57	.305	31

=== Game log ===
1973–74 Game log
#	Date	Opponent	Score	High points	Record
1	October 9	@ Buffalo	105–107 (OT)	Calvin Murphy (31)	0–1
2	October 10	@ Philadelphia	104–88	Mike Newlin (19)	1–1
3	October 12	@ Cleveland	106–99	Rudy Tomjanovich (22)	2–1
4	October 13	@ New York	86–85	Mike Newlin (25)	3–1
5	October 16	Philadelphia	106–101	Rudy Tomjanovich (31)	3–2
6	October 20	Detroit	107–104	Mike Newlin (27)	3–3
7	October 23	Los Angeles	107–98	Mike Newlin (26)	3–4
8	October 24	@ Boston	132–117	Rudy Tomjanovich (34)	4–4
9	October 26	@ Chicago	113–121	Calvin Murphy (32)	4–5
10	October 27	Chicago	102–92	Rudy Tomjanovich (26)	4–6
11	October 31	New York	102–91	Mike Newlin (21)	4–7
12	November 2	Atlanta	125–123	Mike Newlin (36)	4–8
13	November 4	@ Los Angeles	93–106	Rudy Tomjanovich (34)	4–9
14	November 7	Capital	111–97	Rudy Tomjanovich (36)	4–10
15	November 9	@ Cleveland	106–111	Rudy Tomjanovich (37)	4–11
16	November 13	Philadelphia	83–97	Rudy Tomjanovich (27)	5–11
17	November 14	@ Kansas City–Omaha	116–118 (OT)	Rudy Tomjanovich (35)	5–12
18	November 17	Portland	96–87	Rudy Tomjanovich (23)	5–13
19	November 22	Cleveland	104–96	Rudy Tomjanovich (28)	5–14
20	November 23	Cleveland	85–83	Calvin Murphy (16)	5–15
21	November 27	Phoenix	111–125	Rudy Tomjanovich (36)	6–15
22	November 28	@ New York	114–106	Mike Newlin (26)	7–15
23	November 30	Detroit	95–110	Rudy Tomjanovich (25)	8–15
24	December 1	@ Philadelphia	106–108 (OT)	Mike Newlin (30)	8–16
25	December 2	@ Cleveland	130–104	Murphy, Tomjanovich (31)	9–16
26	December 4	@ Milwaukee	109–124	Rudy Tomjanovich (34)	9–17
27	December 5	Capital	99–119	Calvin Murphy (33)	10–17
28	December 9	@ Seattle	110–107	Mike Newlin (31)	11–17
29	December 11	@ Golden State	107–114	Mike Newlin (26)	11–18
30	December 14	Boston	114–106	Rudy Tomjanovich (30)	11–19
31	December 15	@ Chicago	100–104	Rudy Tomjanovich (22)	11–20
32	December 17	New York	109–97	Rudy Tomjanovich (28)	11–21
33	December 19	Seattle	124–118 (OT)	Calvin Murphy (39)	11–22
34	December 21	Atlanta	124–110	Calvin Murphy (30)	11–23
35	December 22	@ Capital	89–98	Rudy Tomjanovich (22)	11–24
36	December 23	@ Cleveland	91–99	Calvin Murphy (17)	11–25
37	December 26	Kansas City–Omaha	95–110	Calvin Murphy (33)	12–25
38	December 28	Milwaukee	127–111	Calvin Murphy (27)	12–26
39	December 29	@ Atlanta	110–114	Calvin Murphy (35)	12–27
40	January 2	@ Philadelphia	101–99	Rudy Tomjanovich (32)	13–27
41	January 4	@ Portland	119–113	Calvin Murphy (33)	14–27
42	January 5	@ Golden State	106–108	Calvin Murphy (29)	14–28
43	January 6	@ Seattle	90–91	Murphy, Newlin (22)	14–29
44	January 8	Golden State	104–92	Calvin Murphy (23)	14–30
45	January 9	@ Phoenix	101–105	Jack Marin (17)	14–31
46	January 11	@ Buffalo	99–117	Jack Marin (24)	14–32
47	January 13	N Buffalo	121–112	Rudy Tomjanovich (42)	15–32
48	January 18	New York	90–96	Rudy Tomjanovich (22)	16–32
49	January 20	@ Capital	105–111	Rudy Tomjanovich (22)	16–33
50	January 22	@ New York	108–93	Mike Newlin (28)	17–33
51	January 23	@ Atlanta	115–104	Rudy Tomjanovich (29)	18–33
52	January 25	@ Detroit	89–93	Calvin Murphy (25)	18–34
53	January 27	Buffalo	122–108	Rudy Tomjanovich (28)	18–35
54	January 29	Seattle	115–107	Calvin Murphy (27)	18–36
55	January 31	Golden State	109–108	Rudy Tomjanovich (30)	18–37
56	February 2	@ Atlanta	107–117	Calvin Murphy (32)	18–38
57	February 3	Atlanta	112–123	Mike Newlin (28)	19–38
58	February 5	Los Angeles	112–116 (OT)	Rudy Tomjanovich (30)	20–38
59	February 8	Cleveland	106–120	Rudy Tomjanovich (39)	21–38
60	February 10	@ Portland	112–106	Rudy Tomjanovich (29)	22–38
61	February 12	@ Los Angeles	129–119	Mike Newlin (30)	23–38
62	February 14	@ Phoenix	99–107	Rudy Tomjanovich (20)	23–39
63	February 17	Buffalo	135–118	Rudy Tomjanovich (28)	23–40
64	February 20	Philadelphia	98–115	Rudy Tomjanovich (21)	24–40
65	February 22	Milwaukee	122–113	Mike Newlin (32)	24–41
66	February 24	Portland	115–133	Rudy Tomjanovich (28)	25–41
67	February 26	Kansas City–Omaha	101–118	Rudy Tomjanovich (30)	26–41
68	March 1	Phoenix	111–117	Calvin Murphy (25)	27–41
69	March 2	@ Atlanta	122–129	Calvin Murphy (23)	27–42
70	March 3	N Milwaukee	112–106 (OT)	Rudy Tomjanovich (26)	27–43
71	March 6	Chicago	105–93	Rudy Tomjanovich (27)	27–44
72	March 8	Boston	106–113	Rudy Tomjanovich (25)	28–44
73	March 10	Cleveland	108–113	Rudy Tomjanovich (28)	29–44
74	March 13	Capital	93–117	Rudy Tomjanovich (22)	30–44
75	March 15	Capital	105–114	Mike Newlin (32)	31–44
76	March 17	@ Kansas City–Omaha	114–125	Murphy, Tomjanovich (25)	31–45
77	March 19	Boston	110–107	Rudy Tomjanovich (27)	31–46
78	March 20	@ Detroit	99–103	Rudy Tomjanovich (37)	31–47
79	March 22	@ Capital	95–109	Rudy Tomjanovich (27)	31–48
80	March 23	N Boston	105–108	Rudy Tomjanovich (32)	31–49
81	March 24	@ Boston	106–109 (OT)	Calvin Murphy (26)	31–50
82	March 26	Buffalo	96–119	Rudy Tomjanovich (38)	32–50
