= 1973–74 Portland Trail Blazers season =

NBA professional basketball team season

- Head coach: Jack McCloskey
- General manager: Harry Glickman
- Owners: Herman Sarkowsky; Larry Weinberg
- Arena: Memorial Coliseum

Results
- Record: 27–55 (.329)
- Place: Division: 5th (Pacific); Conference: 9th (Western)
- Playoff finish: Did not qualify
- Stats at Basketball Reference

Local media
- Television: KPTV
- Radio: KOIN

The 1973–74 Portland Trail Blazers season was the fourth season of the Portland Trail Blazers in the National Basketball Association (NBA). The Blazers finished at 27–55, a six-game improvement from the previous season.

The season started with promise as Portland opened the year with a 10–8 record. A nine-game losing streak followed and sent the Blazers sinking in the standings. They managed to cling to just under .500 but the months of January and February were unkind. Geoff Petrie and Sidney Wicks each garnered selections to the 1974 NBA All-Star game, but massive deficiencies on defense plagued the Blazers. Their lack of a size and experience at center allowed opponents to score almost at will. The Blazers lost 23 of 25 games and wound up with the worst record in the Western Conference. Coach Jack McCloskey was relieved of his duties at the end of the season.

== Draft picks ==
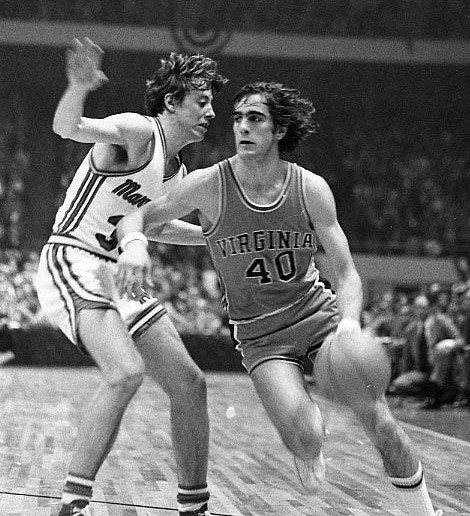
Barry Parkhill was the Trail Blazers first round selection elected to go to the American Basketball Association.

Information from Sports Reference

| Round | Pick | Player | Position | Nationality | School/Club team |
|---|---|---|---|---|---|
| 1 | 15 | Barry Parkhill | G | United States | Virginia |
| 4 | 55 | Bird Averitt | G | United States | Pepperdine |
| 5 | 74 | Bernard Hardin | F | United States | New Mexico |
| 7 | 110 | Doug Richards | G | United States | Brigham Young |
| 8 | 128 | Eldridge Broussard | N/A | United States | Pacific University |
| 9 | 128 | Lee Haven | N/A | United States | Colorado |
| 10 | 163 | Ron Jones | N/A | United States | Oregon State |

== Roster ==
Portland Trail Blazers roster
Players

| Pos. | No. | Player | Height | Weight | DOB | From |
|---|---|---|---|---|---|---|
| PG | 17 | Charlie Davis | 6 ft 2 in (1.88 m) | 160 lb (73 kg) | | Wake Forest |
| G | 13 | Bernie Fryer | 6 ft 3 in (1.91 m) | 185 lb (84 kg) | | BYU |
| SF | 27 | John Johnson | 6 ft 7 in (2.01 m) | 200 lb (91 kg) | | Iowa |
| SF | 44 | Ollie Johnson | 6 ft 6 in (1.98 m) | 200 lb (91 kg) | | Temple |
| PG | 12 | Mo Layton | 6 ft 1 in (1.85 m) | 180 lb (82 kg) | | USC |
| C | 35 | LaRue Martin | 6 ft 11 in (2.11 m) | 208 lb (94 kg) | | Loyola Chicago |
| F | 36 | Lloyd Neal | 6 ft 7 in (2.01 m) | 225 lb (102 kg) | | Tennessee State |
| SG | 45 | Geoff Petrie | 6 ft 4 in (1.93 m) | 190 lb (86 kg) | | Princeton |
| C | 30 | Rick Roberson | 6 ft 9 in (2.06 m) | 231 lb (105 kg) | | Cincinnati |
| SG | 11 | Mark Sibley | 6 ft 2 in (1.88 m) | 175 lb (79 kg) | | Northwestern |
| PF | 4 | Greg Smith | 6 ft 5 in (1.96 m) | 195 lb (88 kg) | | Western Kentucky |
| F | 15 | Larry Steele | 6 ft 5 in (1.96 m) | 180 lb (82 kg) | | Kentucky |
| SG | 17 | Bob Verga | 6 ft 1 in (1.85 m) | 190 lb (86 kg) | | Duke |
| PF | 21 | Sidney Wicks | 6 ft 8 in (2.03 m) | 225 lb (102 kg) | | UCLA |

Coaches
Head coach
- Jack McCloskey

Legend
- (DP) Unsigned draft pick
- (FA) Free agent
- (S) Suspended
- Injured

== Regular season ==
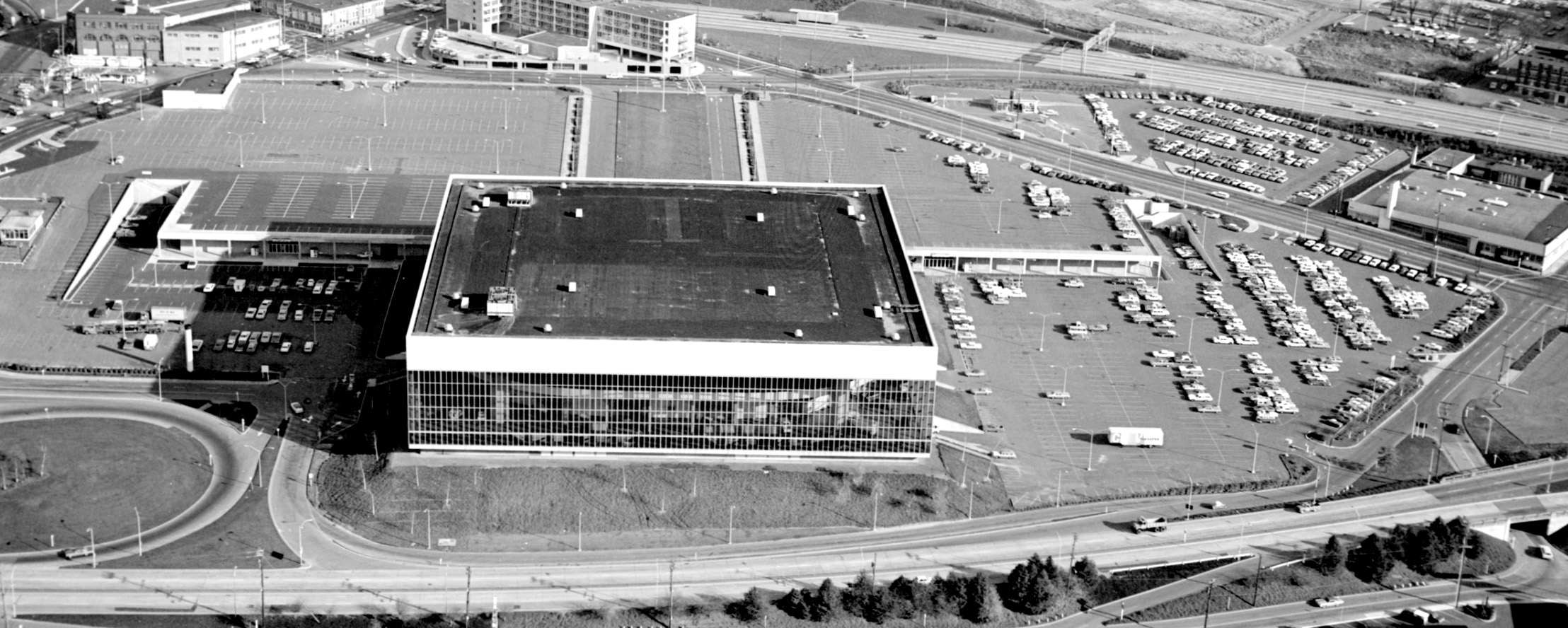
The Trail Blazers played their home games at Veterans Memorial Coliseum.

=== Season standings ===
| Pacific Division | W | L | PCT | GB | Home | Road | Neutral | Div |
|---|---|---|---|---|---|---|---|---|
| y-Los Angeles Lakers | 47 | 35 | .573 | – | 30–11 | 17–24 | – | 14–12 |
| Golden State Warriors | 44 | 38 | .537 | 3 | 23–18 | 20–20 | 1–0 | 15–11 |
| Seattle SuperSonics | 36 | 46 | .439 | 11 | 22–19 | 14–27 | – | 12–14 |
| Phoenix Suns | 30 | 52 | .366 | 17 | 24–17 | 6–34 | 0–1 | 11–15 |
| Portland Trail Blazers | 27 | 55 | .329 | 20 | 22–19 | 5–34 | 0–2 | 13–13 |

| # | Western Conference | | | | |
| # | Team | W | L | PCT | GB |
|---|---|---|---|---|---|
| 1 | z-Milwaukee Bucks | 59 | 23 | .720 | – |
| 2 | x-Chicago Bulls | 54 | 28 | .659 | 5 |
| 3 | x-Detroit Pistons | 52 | 30 | .634 | 7 |
| 4 | y-Los Angeles Lakers | 47 | 35 | .573 | 12 |
| 5 | Golden State Warriors | 44 | 38 | .537 | 15 |
| 6 | Seattle SuperSonics | 36 | 46 | .439 | 23 |
| 7 | Kansas City–Omaha Kings | 33 | 49 | .402 | 26 |
| 8 | Phoenix Suns | 30 | 52 | .366 | 29 |
| 9 | Portland Trail Blazers | 27 | 55 | .329 | 32 |

z – clinched division title
y – clinched division title
x – clinched playoff spot

=== Game log ===
1973–74 Game log
| # | Date | Opponent | Score | High points | Record |
| 1 | October 13 | Capital | 87–132 | Geoff Petrie (29) | 1–0 |
| 2 | October 19 | Kansas City–Omaha | 99–111 | Geoff Petrie (25) | 2–0 |
| 3 | October 20 | Seattle | 108–123 | Geoff Petrie (32) | 3–0 |
| 4 | October 23 | @ Cleveland | 96–103 | Sidney Wicks (22) | 3–1 |
| 5 | October 24 | @ Philadelphia | 110–132 | Geoff Petrie (26) | 3–2 |
| 6 | October 26 | Atlanta | 110–127 | Sidney Wicks (30) | 4–2 |
| 7 | October 27 | Detroit | 111–98 | Geoff Petrie (37) | 4–3 |
| 8 | October 28 | @ Los Angeles | 98–111 | Layton, Neal (19) | 4–4 |
| 9 | October 30 | Los Angeles | 112–114 | Geoff Petrie (26) | 5–4 |
| 10 | November 3 | New York | 100–107 | Petrie, Wicks (21) | 6–4 |
| 11 | November 9 | Buffalo | 108–122 | Sidney Wicks (31) | 7–4 |
| 12 | November 10 | Chicago | 106–104 | Geoff Petrie (27) | 7–5 |
| 13 | November 13 | @ Milwaukee | 100–108 | Geoff Petrie (23) | 7–6 |
| 14 | November 14 | @ Detroit | 111–108 | Geoff Petrie (36) | 8–6 |
| 15 | November 15 | @ Atlanta | 114–123 | Geoff Petrie (40) | 8–7 |
| 16 | November 17 | @ Houston | 96–87 | Sidney Wicks (23) | 9–7 |
| 17 | November 20 | @ Chicago | 101–106 | Geoff Petrie (29) | 9–8 |
| 18 | November 22 | Seattle | 125–131 | Geoff Petrie (43) | 10–8 |
| 19 | November 23 | @ Seattle | 106–127 | Sidney Wicks (16) | 10–9 |
| 20 | November 24 | Los Angeles | 113–108 | Geoff Petrie (27) | 10–10 |
| 21 | November 25 | @ Los Angeles | 109–137 | Rick Roberson (23) | 10–11 |
| 22 | November 29 | @ Golden State | 89–119 | Sidney Wicks (26) | 10–12 |
| 23 | November 30 | Phoenix | 107–99 | John Johnson (24) | 10–13 |
| 24 | December 1 | Los Angeles | 115–134 | John Johnson (31) | 11–13 |
| 25 | December 4 | @ New York | 100–113 | Geoff Petrie (28) | 11–14 |
| 26 | December 5 | @ Buffalo | 110–114 | Roberson, Wicks (24) | 11–15 |
| 27 | December 7 | @ Milwaukee | 86–116 | Geoff Petrie (21) | 11–16 |
| 28 | December 8 | @ Detroit | 91–106 | Larry Steele (19) | 11–17 |
| 29 | December 11 | Capital | 87–82 | Sidney Wicks (22) | 11–18 |
| 30 | December 13 | @ Phoenix | 119–108 | Geoff Petrie (25) | 12–18 |
| 31 | December 14 | Golden State | 101–109 | Sidney Wicks (25) | 13–18 |
| 32 | December 16 | Milwaukee | 121–98 | John Johnson (26) | 13–19 |
| 33 | December 18 | Phoenix | 117–133 | Geoff Petrie (37) | 14–19 |
| 34 | December 21 | Boston | 124–120 (OT) | Geoff Petrie (38) | 14–20 |
| 35 | December 22 | Philadelphia | 105–110 | Geoff Petrie (26) | 15–20 |
| 36 | December 27 | @ Golden State | 118–117 | Geoff Petrie (31) | 16–20 |
| 37 | December 28 | @ Seattle | 93–110 | Geoff Petrie (25) | 16–21 |
| 38 | December 30 | Chicago | 92–99 | John Johnson (24) | 17–21 |
| 39 | January 1 | Buffalo | 120–119 | Geoff Petrie (39) | 17–22 |
| 40 | January 4 | Houston | 119–113 | John Johnson (32) | 17–23 |
| 41 | January 6 | Golden State | 105–106 | Petrie, Wicks (26) | 18–23 |
| 42 | January 8 | Kansas City–Omaha | 110–129 | Petrie, Wicks (27) | 19–23 |
| 43 | January 13 | @ Kansas City–Omaha | 99–103 | Geoff Petrie (23) | 19–24 |
| 44 | January 17 | @ Atlanta | 99–126 | Sidney Wicks (23) | 19–25 |
| 45 | January 19 | @ Milwaukee | 106–121 | Sidney Wicks (27) | 19–26 |
| 46 | January 20 | @ Chicago | 97–99 | Sidney Wicks (21) | 19–27 |
| 47 | January 22 | @ Kansas City–Omaha | 96–103 | Sidney Wicks (26) | 19–28 |
| 48 | January 23 | @ Detroit | 95–121 | Bob Verga (22) | 19–29 |
| 49 | January 25 | Cleveland | 87–84 | Sidney Wicks (31) | 19–30 |
| 50 | January 29 | Milwaukee | 126–106 | Sidney Wicks (25) | 19–31 |
| 51 | January 31 | @ Phoenix | 100–112 | Sidney Wicks (38) | 19–32 |
| 52 | February 2 | Seattle | 97–102 | Sidney Wicks (26) | 20–32 |
| 53 | February 3 | @ Los Angeles | 91–124 | Sidney Wicks (24) | 20–33 |
| 54 | February 5 | Detroit | 104–102 | Geoff Petrie (27) | 20–34 |
| 55 | February 6 | @ Seattle | 94–107 | Geoff Petrie (28) | 20–35 |
| 56 | February 8 | Kansas City–Omaha | 104–99 | Sidney Wicks (25) | 20–36 |
| 57 | February 10 | Houston | 112–106 | John Johnson (27) | 20–37 |
| 58 | February 12 | Phoenix | 104–113 | Rick Roberson (37) | 21–37 |
| 59 | February 15 | Boston | 106–104 | Fryer, Roberson (27) | 21–38 |
| 60 | February 16 | Cleveland | 106–101 | Sidney Wicks (22) | 21–39 |
| 61 | February 17 | @ Phoenix | 100–112 | Sidney Wicks (23) | 21–40 |
| 62 | February 19 | @ New York | 116–119 (OT) | Sidney Wicks (34) | 21–41 |
| 63 | February 20 | @ Capital | 101–116 | Petrie, Wicks (26) | 21–42 |
| 64 | February 22 | @ Chicago | 100–117 | Geoff Petrie (22) | 21–43 |
| 65 | February 24 | @ Houston | 115–133 | Geoff Petrie (23) | 21–44 |
| 66 | February 26 | Philadelphia | 118–110 | Geoff Petrie (32) | 21–45 |
| 67 | February 28 | @ Golden State | 109–129 | Geoff Petrie (32) | 21–46 |
| 68 | March 1 | Chicago | 91–95 | Geoff Petrie (33) | 22–46 |
| 69 | March 3 | Detroit | 99–95 | Geoff Petrie (32) | 22–47 |
| 70 | March 5 | Los Angeles | 102–107 | Sidney Wicks (28) | 23–47 |
| 71 | March 9 | @ Capital | 103–106 | Geoff Petrie (22) | 23–48 |
| 72 | March 10 | N Buffalo | 112–122 | Geoff Petrie (26) | 23–49 |
| 73 | March 12 | N Boston | 93–110 | John Johnson (32) | 23–50 |
| 74 | March 15 | New York | 105–107 | Geoff Petrie (29) | 24–50 |
| 75 | March 16 | Atlanta | 127–128 | Geoff Petrie (37) | 25–50 |
| 76 | March 18 | @ Kansas City–Omaha | 105–114 | Geoff Petrie (31) | 25–51 |
| 77 | March 19 | @ Cleveland | 103–107 | Geoff Petrie (34) | 25–52 |
| 78 | March 20 | @ Philadelphia | 113–106 | Geoff Petrie (43) | 26–52 |
| 79 | March 22 | @ Boston | 118–126 | Geoff Petrie (23) | 26–53 |
| 80 | March 24 | Milwaukee | 120–110 | Larry Steele (26) | 26–54 |
| 81 | March 26 | @ Golden State | 120–143 | Geoff Petrie (32) | 26–55 |
| 82 | March 27 | Golden State | 122–132 | Sidney Wicks (30) | 27–55 |

== Awards and honors ==
- Sidney Wicks, NBA All-Star
- Geoff Petrie, NBA All-Star

== Transactions ==
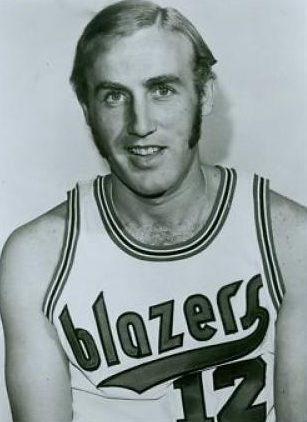
Rick Adelman, who was selected by the Trail Blazers in the 1970 NBA expansion draft, was traded to the Chicago Bulls on October 14, 1973.

- September 27, 1973 – Waived forward Bob Davis
- October 1, 1973 – Signed free agent guard Mo Layton
- October 14, 1973 – Traded guard Rick Adelman to the Chicago Bulls in exchange for a second round pick in the 1974 NBA draft (Phil Lumpkin was chosen).
- October 31, 1973 – Waived guard Charlie Davis and signed free agent guard Mark Sibley
- December 1, 1973 – Waived guard Mo Layton
- December 26, 1973 – Signed free agent guard Bob Verga
- January 8, 1974 – Waived guard Bernie Fryer
- May 20, 1974 – Forward Ollie Johnson was selected by the New Orleans Jazz in the 1974 NBA expansion draft
- June 12, 1974 – Waived guards Mark Sibley and Bob Verga

Transactions via Sports Reference
