= 1973–74 New York Knicks season =

Season of National Basketball Association team the New York Knicks

- Head coach: Red Holzman
- General manager: Red Holzman
- Arena: Madison Square Garden

Results
- Record: 49–33 (.598)
- Place: Division: 2nd (Atlantic); Conference: 3rd (Eastern)
- Playoff finish: Conference finals (lost to Celtics 1–4)
- Stats at Basketball Reference

Local media
- Television: WOR-TV; Manhattan Cable Television (Bob Wolff, Cal Ramsey)
- Radio: WNBC (Marv Albert, John Andariese)

The 1973–74 New York Knicks season was the 28th season for the team in the National Basketball Association (NBA). The Knicks entered the season as the defending NBA champions, having defeated the Los Angeles Lakers in the 1973 NBA Finals in five games to win their second championship. In the regular season, the Knicks finished in second place in the Atlantic Division with a 49–33 record, and qualified for the NBA Playoffs for the eighth consecutive year.

New York opened the 1974 playoffs against the Capital Bullets. With a 4–3 series victory, the Knicks advanced to the Eastern Conference finals, where they faced the Boston Celtics. The Celtics, who later won the NBA Finals, defeated the Knicks in five games, ending New York's title defense.

== Draft picks ==
Note: This is not an extensive list; it only covers the first and second rounds, and any other players picked by the franchise that played at least one game in the league.

Round	Pick	Player	Position	Nationality	School/Club team
1	14	Mel Davis	F	United States	St. John's
2	28	Pat McFarland	F/G	United States	Saint Joseph's
3	49	Allie McGuire	F	United States	Marquette
4	66	George Karl	G	United States	North Carolina
5	83	Dennis Bell	F	United States	Drake

== Roster ==
1973–74 New York Knicks roster
Players

Pos.	No.	Player	Height	Weight	DOB	From
SF	46	Dennis Bell	6 ft 5 in (1.96 m)	185 lb (84 kg)	1951-06-02	Drake
PG	17	Henry Bibby	6 ft 1 in (1.85 m)	185 lb (84 kg)	1949-11-24	UCLA
SF	24	Bill Bradley	6 ft 5 in (1.96 m)	205 lb (93 kg)	1943-07-28	Princeton
PF	31	Mel Davis	6 ft 6 in (1.98 m)	220 lb (100 kg)	1950-11-09	St. John's
PF	22	Dave DeBusschere	6 ft 6 in (1.98 m)	220 lb (100 kg)	1940-10-16	Detroit Mercy
PG	10	Walt Frazier	6 ft 4 in (1.93 m)	200 lb (91 kg)	1945-03-29	Southern Illinois
C	40	John Gianelli	6 ft 10 in (2.08 m)	220 lb (100 kg)	1950-06-10	Pacific
PF	18	Phil Jackson	6 ft 8 in (2.03 m)	220 lb (100 kg)	1945-09-17	North Dakota
F/C	32	Jerry Lucas	6 ft 8 in (2.03 m)	230 lb (104 kg)	1940-03-30	Ohio State
G	7	Dean Meminger	6 ft 0 in (1.83 m)	175 lb (79 kg)	1948-05-13	Marquette
G	15	Earl Monroe	6 ft 3 in (1.91 m)	185 lb (84 kg)	1944-11-21	Winston-Salem State
C	19	Willis Reed	6 ft 9 in (2.06 m)	235 lb (107 kg)	1942-06-25	Grambling State
C	6	Tom Riker	6 ft 10 in (2.08 m)	225 lb (102 kg)	1950-02-28	South Carolina
PF	43	Harthorne Wingo	6 ft 6 in (1.98 m)	210 lb (95 kg)	1947-09-09	Friendship College

Coaches
Head coach
- Red Holzman

Legend
- (DP) Unsigned draft pick
- (FA) Free agent
- (S) Suspended
- Injured

== Regular season ==
=== Season standings ===
Atlantic Division	W	L	PCT	GB	Home	Road	Neutral	Div
y-Boston Celtics	56	26	.683	–	26–6	21–18	9–2	17–5
x-New York Knicks	49	33	.598	7	28–13	21–19	0–1	10–12
x-Buffalo Braves	42	40	.512	14	19–13	17–21	6–6	12–10
Philadelphia 76ers	25	57	.305	31	14–23	9–30	2–4	5–17

#	Eastern Conference				
#	Team	W	L	PCT	GB
1	z-Boston Celtics	56	26	.683	–
2	x-New York Knicks	49	33	.598	7
3	y-Capital Bullets	47	35	.573	9
4	x-Buffalo Braves	42	40	.512	14
5	Atlanta Hawks	35	47	.427	21
6	Houston Rockets	32	50	.390	24
7	Cleveland Cavaliers	29	53	.354	27
8	Philadelphia 76ers	25	57	.305	31

z – clinched division title
y – clinched division title
x – clinched playoff spot

=== Game log ===
1973–74 game log
#	Date	Opponent	Score	High points	Record
1	October 9	Detroit	100–101	Walt Frazier (27)	1–0
2	October 13	Houston	86–85	Dave DeBusschere (24)	1–1
3	October 16	Buffalo	91–117	Dave DeBusschere (28)	2–1
4	October 19	@ Cleveland	92–90	Dave DeBusschere (24)	3–1
5	October 20	Chicago	85–69	Walt Frazier (18)	3–2
6	October 23	Capital	101–84	Dave DeBusschere (18)	3–3
7	October 26	@ Boston	101–113	Walt Frazier (21)	3–4
8	October 27	Philadelphia	90–96	Willis Reed (23)	4–4
9	October 31	@ Houston	102–91	Dave DeBusschere (21)	5–4
10	November 2	@ Los Angeles	106–91	Walt Frazier (44)	6–4
11	November 3	@ Portland	100–107	Dave DeBusschere (23)	6–5
12	November 4	@ Seattle	111–106	Walt Frazier (24)	7–5
13	November 8	Boston	94–84	Walt Frazier (18)	7–6
14	November 9	@ Philadelphia	91–94	Walt Frazier (33)	7–7
15	November 10	Cleveland	90–100	Walt Frazier (24)	8–7
16	November 13	Seattle	102–104	Walt Frazier (26)	9–7
17	November 15	Buffalo	86–97	Bradley, Frazier (22)	10–7
18	November 17	Milwaukee	93–100	Dave DeBusschere (26)	11–7
19	November 20	Los Angeles	89–105	Bill Bradley (29)	12–7
20	November 22	@ Milwaukee	91–107	Walt Frazier (30)	12–8
21	November 24	Golden State	107–99	Walt Frazier (34)	12–9
22	November 25	@ Capital	81–109	Willis Reed (16)	12–10
23	November 28	Houston	114–106	Walt Frazier (26)	12–11
24	November 30	@ Chicago	97–115	Frazier, Jackson (15)	12–12
25	December 1	Cleveland	99–119	Phil Jackson (30)	13–12
26	December 4	Portland	100–113	Walt Frazier (27)	14–12
27	December 5	@ Boston	97–119	Walt Frazier (25)	14–13
28	December 7	@ Buffalo	113–108	Dave DeBusschere (41)	15–13
29	December 8	Atlanta	100–117	Walt Frazier (25)	16–13
30	December 11	Phoenix	97–105	Dave DeBusschere (28)	17–13
31	December 15	Kansas City–Omaha	107–116	Dave DeBusschere (25)	18–13
32	December 17	@ Houston	109–97	Walt Frazier (29)	19–13
33	December 19	@ Atlanta	105–107	Bill Bradley (25)	19–14
34	December 21	@ Buffalo	115–117	Walt Frazier (26)	19–15
35	December 22	Detroit	88–99	Dave DeBusschere (25)	20–15
36	December 25	Capital	102–100	Walt Frazier (27)	20–16
37	December 26	@ Detroit	96–91	Dave DeBusschere (23)	21–16
38	December 29	Philadelphia	92–112	Bill Bradley (21)	22–16
39	December 30	@ Kansas City–Omaha	102–85	Dave DeBusschere (34)	23–16
40	January 1	Atlanta	89–99	Phil Jackson (23)	24–16
41	January 2	@ Capital	92–81	Walt Frazier (25)	25–16
42	January 4	@ Philadelphia	75–78	Henry Bibby (14)	25–17
43	January 5	Buffalo	111–110	Bill Bradley (24)	25–18
44	January 8	@ Chicago	108–80	Dave DeBusschere (31)	26–18
45	January 11	@ Seattle	107–98	Bill Bradley (20)	27–18
46	January 12	@ Golden State	96–80	Bill Bradley (20)	28–18
47	January 18	@ Houston	90–96	Walt Frazier (19)	28–19
48	January 19	@ Phoenix	89–112	Dave DeBusschere (25)	28–20
49	January 22	Houston	108–93	Walt Frazier (30)	28–21
50	January 26	Philadelphia	98–122	Walt Frazier (23)	29–21
51	January 27	@ Atlanta	111–89	Walt Frazier (27)	30–21
52	January 29	Boston	83–104	Walt Frazier (23)	31–21
53	January 30	@ Kansas City–Omaha	108–88	Dave DeBusschere (19)	32–21
54	February 1	@ Detroit	91–96	DeBusschere, Monroe (16)	32–22
55	February 2	Cleveland	87–103	Walt Frazier (21)	33–22
56	February 5	Phoenix	90–106	Earl Monroe (23)	34–22
57	February 8	@ Boston	97–125	John Gianelli (15)	34–23
58	February 9	Buffalo	103–100 (OT)	Earl Monroe (24)	34–24
59	February 12	@ Buffalo	100–93	Phil Jackson (24)	35–24
60	February 13	Chicago	80–89	Walt Frazier (24)	36–24
61	February 16	Golden State	107–117	Walt Frazier (31)	37–24
62	February 17	@ Milwaukee	86–97	Earl Monroe (20)	37–25
63	February 19	Portland	116–119 (OT)	Walt Frazier (32)	38–25
64	February 21	N Buffalo	97–119	Walt Frazier (17)	38–26
65	February 22	@ Cleveland	117–110	Walt Frazier (25)	39–26
66	February 23	Atlanta	90–98	Bradley, Frazier (21)	40–26
67	February 26	Capital	71–85	Walt Frazier (21)	41–26
68	March 1	@ Capital	112–103	Dave DeBusschere (28)	42–26
69	March 2	Boston	104–88	Dave DeBusschere (21)	42–27
70	March 3	@ Boston	108–102 (OT)	Dave DeBusschere (26)	43–27
71	March 5	Seattle	106–111	Walt Frazier (25)	44–27
72	March 6	@ Atlanta	96–94	Frazier, Monroe (20)	45–27
73	March 9	Milwaukee	75–88	DeBusschere, Monroe (20)	46–27
74	March 10	@ Philadelphia	108–109	Walt Frazier (25)	46–28
75	March 12	Los Angeles	109–102	Earl Monroe (20)	46–29
76	March 14	@ Golden State	107–95	Dave DeBusschere (30)	47–29
77	March 15	@ Portland	105–107	Phil Jackson (23)	47–30
78	March 17	@ Los Angeles	114–126	John Gianelli (25)	47–31
79	March 20	@ Phoenix	106–104 (OT)	Bill Bradley (31)	48–31
80	March 23	Kansas City–Omaha	107–106	Earl Monroe (20)	48–32
81	March 24	@ Cleveland	92–114	Dave DeBusschere (20)	48–33
82	March 26	Philadelphia	90–117	Henry Bibby (21)	49–33

== Playoffs ==
1974 playoff game log
Conference semifinals: 4–3 (home: 3–1; road: 1–2)

Game	Date	Team	Score	High points	High rebounds	High assists	Location Attendance	Series
1	March 29	Capital	W 102–91	Walt Frazier (20)	Walt Frazier (12)	Dave DeBusschere (7)	Madison Square Garden; 19,694	1–0
2	March 31	@ Capital	L 87–99	Dave DeBusschere (20)	Dave DeBusschere (10)	Jerry Lucas (5)	Capital Centre; 16,522	1–1
3	April 2	Capital	L 79–88	Walt Frazier (20)	Dave DeBusschere (12)	DeBusschere, Meminger (5)	Madison Square Garden; 19,694	1–2
4	April 5	@ Capital	W 101–93 (OT)	Earl Monroe (23)	Walt Frazier (11)	Walt Frazier (6)	Capital Centre; 19,035	2–2
5	April 7	Capital	W 106–105	Walt Frazier (38)	Dave DeBusschere (8)	Walt Frazier (4)	Madison Square Garden; 19,694	3–2
6	April 10	@ Capital	L 92–109	Walt Frazier (25)	Phil Jackson (8)	Walt Frazier (10)	Capital Centre; 19,025	3–3
7	April 12	Capital	W 91–81	Earl Monroe (20)	DeBusschere, Gianelli (15)	Dave DeBusschere (7)	Madison Square Garden; 19,694	4–3

Conference finals: 1–4 (home: 0–2; road: 1–2)

Game	Date	Team	Score	High points	High rebounds	High assists	Location Attendance	Series
1	April 14	@ Boston	L 88–113	Walt Frazier (16)	Dave DeBusschere (10)	Meminger, Bibby (3)	Boston Garden; 14,101	0–1
2	April 16	Boston	L 99–111	Bill Bradley (20)	Dave DeBusschere (9)	Walt Frazier (4)	Madison Square Garden; 19,694	0–2
3	April 19	@ Boston	W 103–100	Walt Frazier (38)	Frazier, Gianelli (10)	Walt Frazier (4)	Boston Garden; 15,320	1–2
4	April 21	Boston	L 91–98	Walt Frazier (25)	John Gianelli (9)	Earl Monroe (5)	Madison Square Garden; 19,694	1–3
5	April 24	@ Boston	L 94–105	Phil Jackson (27)	Phil Jackson (9)	Walt Frazier (6)	Boston Garden; 15,320	1–4

1974 schedule

== Player statistics ==
Legend
GP	Games played	GS	Games started	MPG	Minutes per game
FG%	Field-goal percentage	3P%	3-point field-goal percentage	FT%	Free-throw percentage
RPG	Rebounds per game	APG	Assists per game	SPG	Steals per game
BPG	Blocks per game	PPG	Points per game

== Awards and records ==
- Walt Frazier, All-NBA First Team
- Walt Frazier, NBA All-Defensive First Team
- Dave DeBusschere, NBA All-Defensive First Team
