= 1973–74 Atlanta Hawks season =

Season of National Basketball Association team the Atlanta Hawks

- Head coach: Cotton Fitzsimmons
- Arena: Omni Coliseum

Results
- Record: 35–47 (.427)
- Place: Division: 2nd (Central); Conference: 5th (Eastern)
- Playoff finish: Did not qualify
- Stats at Basketball Reference

Local media
- Television: WTCG
- Radio: WSB

The 1973–74 Atlanta Hawks season was the 28th season of the franchise, 27th in the National Basketball Association (NBA). Although "Pistol" Pete Maravich finished second in the league in scoring with 27.7 points per game, the Hawks missed the playoffs for the first time in 12 seasons. Following the season, the Hawks would trade Maravich to the expansion New Orleans Jazz in exchange for Dean Meminger, Bob Kauffman, and four draft picks.

== Draft picks ==
Round	Pick	Player	Position	Nationality	College
1		Dwight Jones		United States	Houston
1		John Brown		United States	Missouri
2		Tom Ingelsby		United States	Villanova
3		Ted Manakas		United States	Princeton
3		Leonard Gray		United States	Long Beach State
4		James Brown		United States	Harvard
5		Dave Winfield		United States	Minnesota
6		John Williamson		United States	New Mexico State
7		Pete Harris		United States	Stephen F. Austin
8		Tim Dominey		United States	Valdosta State

== Roster ==
1973–74 Atlanta Hawks roster
Players

Pos.	No.	Player	Height	Weight	DOB	From
C	8	Walt Bellamy	6 ft 11 in (2.11 m)	225 lb (102 kg)		Indiana
G	20	Steve Bracey	6 ft 2 in (1.88 m)	175 lb (79 kg)		Tulsa
F	50	John Brown	6 ft 7 in (2.01 m)	220 lb (100 kg)		Missouri
G	3	Herm Gilliam	6 ft 3 in (1.91 m)	190 lb (86 kg)		Purdue
G/F	23	Lou Hudson	6 ft 5 in (1.96 m)	210 lb (95 kg)		Minnesota
C	13	Dwight Jones	6 ft 10 in (2.08 m)	210 lb (95 kg)		Houston
G	44	Pete Maravich	6 ft 5 in (1.96 m)	197 lb (89 kg)		LSU
C	54	Dale Schlueter	6 ft 10 in (2.08 m)	225 lb (102 kg)		Colorado State
SF	22	John Tschogl	6 ft 6 in (1.98 m)	206 lb (93 kg)		UC Santa Barbara
F	12	Jim Washington	6 ft 6 in (1.98 m)	210 lb (95 kg)		Villanova
G/F	25	John Wetzel	6 ft 5 in (1.96 m)	190 lb (86 kg)		Virginia Tech

Coaches
Head coach
- Cotton Fitzsimmons

Legend
- (DP) Unsigned draft pick
- (FA) Free agent
- (S) Suspended
- Injured

== Regular season ==
=== Season standings ===
Central Division	W	L	PCT	GB	Home	Road	Neutral	Div
y-Capital Bullets	47	35	.573	–	31–10	15–25	1–0	14–8
Atlanta Hawks	35	47	.427	12	23–18	12–25	0–4	13–9
Houston Rockets	32	50	.390	15	18–23	13–25	1–2	9–13
Cleveland Cavaliers	29	53	.354	18	18–23	11–28	0–2	8–14

#	Eastern Conference				
#	Team	W	L	PCT	GB
1	z-Boston Celtics	56	26	.683	–
2	x-New York Knicks	49	33	.598	7
3	y-Capital Bullets	47	35	.573	9
4	x-Buffalo Braves	42	40	.512	14
5	Atlanta Hawks	35	47	.427	21
6	Houston Rockets	32	50	.390	24
7	Cleveland Cavaliers	29	53	.354	27
8	Philadelphia 76ers	25	57	.305	31

=== Game log ===
1973–74 game log
October

Game	Date	Team	Score	Location Attendance	Record
1	10/09/1973	Capital Bullets	114–128	The Omni; 7,503	1–0
2	10/11/1973	Los Angeles Lakers	102–129	The Omni; 6,021	2–0
3	10/12/1973	@ Detroit Pistons	105–122	Cobo Arena; 5,020	2–1
4	10/13/1973	Kansas City–Omaha Kings	117–102	The Omni; 11,476	2–2
5	10/20/1973	@ Phoenix Suns	108–118	Arizona Veterans Memorial Coliseum; 8,009	2–3
6	10/21/1973	@ Los Angeles Lakers	119–100	The Forum; 14,875	3–3
7	10/24/1973	@ Seattle SuperSonics	131–106	Seattle Center Coliseum; 9,626	4–3
8	10/26/1973	@ Portland Trail Blazers	110–127	Memorial Coliseum; 7,714	4–4
9	10/27/1973	@ Golden State Warriors	125–116	Oakland-Alameda County Coliseum Arena; 5,073	5–4
10	10/30/1973	Phoenix Suns	101–122	The Omni; 9,070	6–4

November

Game	Date	Team	Score	Location Attendance	Record
11	11/2/1973	@ Houston Rockets	125–123	Hofheinz Pavilion; 3,568	7–4
12	11/3/1973	Boston Celtics	122–109	The Omni; 10,238	7–5
13	11/4/1973	@ Cleveland Cavaliers	115–110	Cleveland Arena; 3,567	8–5
14	11/8/1973	Detroit Pistons	129–115	The Omni; 8,611	8–6
15	11/10/1973	Philadelphia 76ers	97–120	The Omni; 6,219	9–6
16	11/13/1973	@ Buffalo Braves	114–121	Buffalo Memorial Auditorium; 6,885	9–7
17	11/15/1973	Portland Trail Blazers	114–123	The Omni; 6,763	10–7
18	11/17/1973	Capital Bullets	115–109	The Omni; 9,229	10–8
19	11/22/1973	Golden State Warriors	101–99	The Omni; 6,154	10–9
20	11/23/1973	@ Capital Bullets	86–101	Capital Centre; 9,046	10–10
21	11/24/1973	Milwaukee Bucks	112–92	The Omni; 9,111	10–11
22	11/27/1973	@ Kansas City–Omaha Kings	129–110	Omaha Civic Auditorium; 7,997	11–11
23	11/28/1973	Buffalo Braves	106–130	The Omni; 9,531	12–11

December

Game	Date	Team	Score	Location Attendance	Record
24	12/1/1973	Seattle SuperSonics	110–120	The Omni; 7,194	13–11
25	12/5/1973	@ Kansas City–Omaha Kings	105–117	Omaha Civic Auditorium; 5,227	13–12
26	12/7/1973	@ Boston Celtics	112–116	Boston Garden; 13,577	13–13
27	12/8/1973	@ New York Knicks	100–117	Madison Square Garden; 19,694	13–14
28	12/11/1973	Buffalo Braves	132–127 (OT)	The Omni; 9,115	13–15
29	12/15/1973	@ Milwaukee Bucks	82–116	Milwaukee Arena; 9,785	13–16
30	12/18/1973	@ Capital Bullets	98–91	Capital Centre; 9,135	14–16
31	12/19/1973	New York Knicks	105–107	The Omni; 7,398	15–16
32	12/21/1973	@ Houston Rockets	124–110	Hofheinz Pavilion; 4,547	16–16
33	12/22/1973	Cleveland Cavaliers	108–98	The Omni; 5,602	16–17
34	12/26/1973	Philadelphia 76ers	118–145	The Omni; 9,914	17–17
35	12/28/1973	@ Chicago Bulls	94–118	Chicago Stadium; 10,231	17–18
36	12/29/1973	Houston Rockets	110–114	The Omni; 8,388	18–18
37	12/30/1973	@ Cleveland Cavaliers	99–94	Cleveland Arena; 6,442	19–18

January

Game	Date	Team	Score	Location Attendance	Record
38	1/1/1974	@ New York Knicks	89–99	Madison Square Garden; 19,694	19–19
39	1/2/1974	Phoenix Suns	116–113	The Omni; 9,232	19–20
40	1/5/1974	Cleveland Cavaliers	86–99	The Omni; 7,370	20–20
41	1/6/1974	N Buffalo Braves	117–109	Maple Leaf Gardens; 7,484	20–21
42	1/8/1974	@ Buffalo Braves	96–100	Buffalo Memorial Auditorium; 10,472	20–22
43	1/10/1974	Chicago Bulls	116–104	The Omni; 9,194	20–23
44	1/11/1974	N Philadelphia 76ers	121–100	Hersheypark Arena; 3,528	20–24
45	1/13/1974	Boston Celtics	128–105	The Omni; 4,260	20–25
46	1/17/1974	Portland Trail Blazers	99–126	The Omni; 8,031	21–25
47	1/18/1974	@ Boston Celtics	94–98	Boston Garden; 13,157	21–26
48	1/19/1974	Seattle SuperSonics	109–127	The Omni; 6,938	22–26
49	1/22/1974	@ Chicago Bulls	89–102	Chicago Stadium; 7,118	22–27
50	1/23/1974	Houston Rockets	115–104	The Omni; 8,103	22–28
51	1/26/1974	Buffalo Braves	122–132	The Omni; 8,533	23–28
52	1/27/1974	New York Knicks	111–89	The Omni; 7,088	23–29
53	1/29/1974	@ Cleveland Cavaliers	111–118	Cleveland Arena; 4,453	23–30
54	1/30/1974	Golden State Warriors	129–122	The Omni; 8,696	23–31

February

Game	Date	Team	Score	Location Attendance	Record
55	2/2/1974	Houston Rockets	107–117	The Omni; 7,573	24–31
56	2/3/1974	@ Houston Rockets	112–123	Hofheinz Pavilion; 4,126	24–32
57	2/5/1974	Capital Bullets	103–121	The Omni; 6,265	25–32
58	2/6/1974	Los Angeles Lakers	103–107	The Omni; 5,487	26–32
59	2/8/1974	@ Philadelphia 76ers	84–104	Spectrum; 2,667	26–33
60	2/9/1974	Cleveland Cavaliers	90–99	The Omni; 5,534	27–33
61	2/11/1974	Philadelphia 76ers	116–95	The Omni; 6,007	27–34
62	2/14/1974	@ Golden State Warriors	105–121	Oakland-Alameda County Coliseum Arena; 6,326	27–35
63	2/16/1974	@ Phoenix Suns	123–124 (OT)	Arizona Veterans Memorial Coliseum; 8,510	27–36
64	2/17/1974	@ Los Angeles Lakers	113–110	The Forum; 16,114	28–36
65	2/20/1974	N Milwaukee Bucks	110–94	Wisconsin Field House; 9,455	28–37
66	2/23/1974	@ New York Knicks	90–98	Madison Square Garden; 19,694	28–38
67	2/24/1974	N Boston Celtics	111–96	Providence Civic Center; 5,819	28–39
68	2/27/1974	Kansas City–Omaha Kings	85–76	The Omni; 6,859	28–40

March

Game	Date	Team	Score	Location Attendance	Record
69	3/1/1974	Milwaukee Bucks	89–105	The Omni; 8,470	29–40
70	3/2/1974	Houston Rockets	122–129	The Omni; 6,091	30–40
71	3/5/1974	@ Capital Bullets	89–103	Capital Centre; 9,878	30–41
72	3/6/1974	New York Knicks	96–94	The Omni; 5,819	30–42
73	3/9/1974	Chicago Bulls	99–106	The Omni; 8,018	31–42
74	3/10/1974	Detroit Pistons	116–111	The Omni; 6,889	31–43
75	3/12/1974	@ Cleveland Cavaliers	84–95	Cleveland Arena; 4,514	31–44
76	3/15/1974	@ Seattle SuperSonics	126–107	Seattle Center Coliseum; 14,078	32–44
77	3/16/1974	@ Portland Trail Blazers	127–128	Memorial Coliseum; 8,162	32–45
78	3/20/1974	Boston Celtics	89–99	The Omni; 6,821	33–45
79	3/22/1974	@ Philadelphia 76ers	107–106	Spectrum; 6,220	34–45
80	3/23/1974	Capital Bullets	108–119 (OT)	The Omni; 8,113	35–45
81	3/24/1974	@ Capital Bullets	92–120	Capital Centre; 11,766	35–46
82	3/26/1974	@ Detroit Pistons	108–109	Cobo Arena; 8,409	35–47

1973–74 schedule

== Awards and records ==
=== Awards ===
- John Brown, NBA All-Rookie Team 1st Team
