= Randy Smith (basketball) =

American basketball player (1948–2009)

Personal information
- Born: December 12, 1948 Bellport, New York, U.S.
- Died: June 4, 2009 (aged 60) Norwich, Connecticut, U.S.
- Listed height: 6 ft 3 in (1.91 m)
- Listed weight: 180 lb (82 kg)

Career information
- High school: Bellport (Brookhaven, New York)
- College: Buffalo State (1968–1971)
- NBA draft: 1971: 7th round, 104th overall pick
- Drafted by: Buffalo Braves
- Playing career: 1971–1983
- Position: Shooting guard
- Number: 9, 7

Career history
- 1971–1979: Buffalo Braves / San Diego Clippers
- 1979–1981: Cleveland Cavaliers
- 1981–1982: New York Knicks
- 1982–1983: San Diego Clippers
- 1983: Atlanta Hawks

Career highlights
- 2× NBA All-Star (1976, 1978); NBA All-Star Game MVP (1978); All-NBA Second Team (1976); 2x NCAA soccer All-American

Career NBA statistics
- Points: 16,262 (16.7 ppg)
- Assists: 4,487 (4.6 apg)
- Steals: 1,403 (1.7 spg)
- Stats at NBA.com
- Stats at Basketball Reference

Randolph Smith (December 12, 1948 – June 4, 2009) was an American professional basketball player who set the NBA record for consecutive games played. From 1972 to 1982, Smith played in every regular season game, en route to a then-record of 906 straight games (since broken by A.C. Green). In college, he was a Division II All-American basketball player, soccer player and track athlete. He was born in Bellport, New York.

== Early life ==
Randolph Smith was born on December 12, 1948, in Bellport, New York. He attended Bellport High School in Brookhaven, New York, where he excelled in basketball.

== College career ==
Smith was an outstanding all-around athlete at Buffalo State College, earning All-American honors in three sports: basketball, soccer and track. At Bellport High School on Long Island, Smith was a standout on the soccer and basketball teams, and also set a state high jump record of 6 ft 6 in (1.98 m). However, it was on the basketball court that Smith shone brightest, teaming with Durie Burns to lead the Bengals to three straight conference championships, including a trip to the Final Four of the NCAA Division II Tournament in 1970, where Smith earned All-Tournament honors.

== Professional career ==
=== Buffalo Braves / San Diego Clippers (1971–1979) ===
Smith surprised everyone in training camp, and he made the final roster cuts. Despite standing only 6-foot-3, he was assigned to play forward. He averaged 13.4 points per game in his rookie season. Smith continued to improve beyond expectation, drawing on his tremendous speed, quickness and leaping ability. His style of play, along with contemporaries like Julius Erving, marked by fast breaks and "above the rim" ball movements influenced the offensive style of the NBA in the late 1970s and early 1980s. Playing alongside league scoring champion Bob McAdoo, Smith averaged 21.8 points per game in the 1975–76 season, and was named to the All-NBA Second Team.

The highlight of Smith's career was the 1978 NBA All-Star Game, where he came off the bench to lead all scorers with 27 points, and was named the game's Most Valuable Player.

Smith played for seven years for the Braves until the franchise became the San Diego Clippers in 1978. That first year with the Clippers, Smith had his fourth consecutive season averaging over 20 points per game.

=== Cleveland Cavaliers (1979–1981) ===
In 1979, Smith was traded to the Cleveland Cavaliers, where he was named team captain and played for two years.

=== New York Knicks (1981–1982) ===
Smith spent the 1981 season with the New York Knicks.

=== Return to San Diego (1982–1983) ===
The next season, Smith moved back to San Diego for another season.

On November 3, 1982, Smith played in his 845th consecutive NBA game, breaking Johnny Kerr's iron man record. The game was a 130–111 loss to the Philadelphia 76ers in which Smith started and scored 14 points. Smith's iron man streak ended at 906 games when he played his last game with the Clippers on March 13, 1983. He had requested to be waived to play for a contender late in the 1982–83 NBA season and he missed a game while waiting to clear waivers. The record was later surpassed by A.C. Green in 1997.

=== Atlanta Hawks (1983) ===
Smith was traded to the Atlanta Hawks, where he played 15 games before retiring.

== NASL ==
In early 1975 at age 26, while nearing the height of his basketball career, Smith tried out for the expansion Tampa Bay Rowdies of the North American Soccer League. The Rowdies' management had hoped to sign the two-time college soccer All-American for the outdoor season as one of their "required" American players; however, his contract with the Hawks would not allow him to play professional soccer at the time. A year later while in between basketball contracts, the Rowdies gave him another look, but did not sign him to a contract. After a third and final tryout in 1977, Rowdies coach Eddie Firmani felt that the combination of playing pro basketball and not playing any soccer for so long had diminished Smith's soccer skills too much.

== Executive and coaching career ==
After retiring as a player, Smith was an NBA league executive whose duties included assisting former players in need, and he was a coach in the Continental Basketball Association before working at Mohegan Sun in Uncasville, where he worked in marketing.

== Post-playing career ==
Smith was inducted into the Suffolk Sports Hall of Fame on Long Island in the Basketball Category with the Class of 1990. He was inducted into the Greater Buffalo Sports Hall of Fame in 1992.

On June 4, 2009, Smith died in Norwich, Connecticut, after a heart attack during a workout. He's buried at the Forest Lawn East Cemetery, Weddington, NC.

== NBA career statistics ==
Legend
GP	Games played	GS	Games started	MPG	Minutes per game
FG%	Field goal percentage	3P%	3-point field goal percentage	FT%	Free throw percentage
RPG	Rebounds per game	APG	Assists per game	SPG	Steals per game
BPG	Blocks per game	PPG	Points per game	**Bold**	Career high

=== Regular season ===
Year	Team	GP	GS	MPG	FG%	3P%	FT%	RPG	APG	SPG	BPG	PPG
1971–72	Buffalo	76	–	27.6	.482	–	.622	4.8	2.5	–	–	13.4
1972–73	Buffalo	**82**	–	31.7	.443	–	.727	4.8	5.1	–	–	14.8
1973–74	Buffalo	**82**	–	33.5	.492	–	.712	3.8	4.7	**2.5**	0.0	15.5
1974–75	Buffalo	**82**	–	36.6	.484	–	.800	4.2	**6.5**	1.7	0.0	17.8
1975–76	Buffalo	**82**	–	38.6	**.494**	–	.817	5.1	5.9	1.9	0.0	21.8
1976–77	Buffalo	**82**	–	37.7	.467	–	.762	**5.6**	5.4	2.1	0.1	20.7
1977–78	Buffalo	**82**	–	**40.4**	.465	–	.800	3.8	5.6	2.1	0.1	**24.6**
1978–79	San Diego	**82**	–	37.9	.455	–	.813	3.6	4.8	2.2	0.1	20.5
1979–80	Cleveland	**82**	–	32.6	.452	.189	.823	3.1	4.4	1.5	0.1	17.6
1980–81	Cleveland	**82**	–	26.8	.466	.036	.815	2.4	4.4	1.4	**0.2**	14.6
1981–82	New York	**82**	40	24.8	.465	**.273**	.808	1.9	3.1	1.1	0.0	10.0
1982–83	San Diego	65	16	19.4	.489	.188	.863	1.4	3.0	0.8	0.0	9.1
1982–83	Atlanta	15	0	9.5	.439	.000	**.929**	0.5	0.9	0.1	0.0	4.7
Career		976	56	32.2	.470	.155	.781	3.7	4.6	1.7	0.1	16.7
All-Star		2	0	22.0	.714	–	.833	4.0	4.5	1.5	0.5	17.5

=== Playoffs ===
Year	Team	GP	GS	MPG	FG%	3P%	FT%	RPG	APG	SPG	BPG	PPG
1974	Buffalo	6	–	37.8	.400	–	.650	4.3	4.5	1.7	**0.2**	14.2
1975	Buffalo	7	–	40.9	.476	–	.867	4.3	7.0	**2.6**	0.1	18.0
1976	Buffalo	**9**	–	**42.9**	**.503**	–	.837	**5.8**	**8.6**	1.6	0.0	**22.6**
1983	Atlanta	2	–	7.5	.200	–	**1.000**	0.5	2.0	0.5	0.0	3.0
Career		24	–	38.1	.465	–	.816	4.5	6.5	1.8	0.1	17.5

== See also ==
- Iron man
- List of National Basketball Association career steals leaders
- List of NBA single-game steals leaders
- List of National Basketball Association franchise career scoring leaders
