= Bob Weiss =

American basketball player and coach (born 1942)

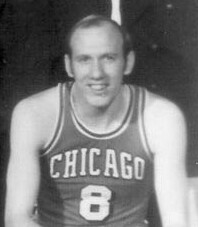
- Weiss with the Chicago Bulls in 1969

Personal information
- Born: May 7, 1942 (age 84) Easton, Pennsylvania, U.S.
- Listed height: 6 ft 2 in (1.88 m)
- Listed weight: 180 lb (82 kg)

Career information
- High school: Athens Area (Athens, Pennsylvania)
- College: Penn State (1962–1965)
- NBA draft: 1965: 3rd round, 22nd overall pick
- Drafted by: Philadelphia 76ers
- Playing career: 1965–1977
- Position: Point guard
- Number: 35, 12, 21, 8
- Coaching career: 1978–2019

Career history

Playing
- 1965: Philadelphia 76ers
- 1965–1967: Wilmington Blue Bombers
- 1967: Philadelphia 76ers
- 1967–1968: Seattle SuperSonics
- 1968: Milwaukee Bucks
- 1968–1974: Chicago Bulls
- 1974–1976: Buffalo Braves
- 1976–1977: Washington Bullets

Career highlights
- NBA champion (1967); 2× EPBL champion (1966, 1967); All-EPBL First Team (1967)

Career NBA statistics
- Points: 5,989 (7.6 ppg)
- Rebounds: 1,398 (1.8 rpg)
- Assists: 2,931 (3.7 apg)
- Stats at NBA.com
- Stats at Basketball Reference

Robert William Weiss (born May 7, 1942) is an American former professional basketball player and coach.

== Early life and education ==
Weiss was born on May 7, 1942, in Easton, Pennsylvania. He played high school basketball at Athens Area High School in Athens, Pennsylvania.

=== College career and statistics ===
Weiss played college basketball at Penn State University from 1963 to 1965, where he averaged 16.3 points per game during his senior season.

Legend
GP	Games played	GS	Games started	MPG	Minutes per game
FG%	Field goal percentage	3P%	3-point field goal percentage	FT%	Free throw percentage
RPG	Rebounds per game	APG	Assists per game	SPG	Steals per game
BPG	Blocks per game	PPG	Points per game	**Bold**	Career high

Year	Team	GP	GS	MPG	FG%	3P%	FT%	RPG	APG	SPG	BPG	PPG
1962–63	Penn State	20	–	–	.423	–	.704	4.5	–	–	–	15.3
1963–64	Penn State	23	–	–	**.436**	–	**.800**	3.9	–	–	–	**17.0**
1964–65	Penn State	**24**	–	–	.420	–	.769	**4.8**	–	–	–	16.4
Career		67	–	–	.427	–	.762	4.4	–	–	–	16.3

== National Basketball Association ==
=== Philadelphia 76ers ===
Weiss was selected by the Philadelphia 76ers in the 1965 NBA draft in the third round with the 22nd overall selection. Weiss interspersed his career with the 76ers with a stint in the Eastern Professional Basketball League (EPBL), where he played for the Wilmington Blue Bombers in Wilmington, Delaware. Weiss won EPBL championships with the Blue Bombers in 1966 and 1967. He led the EPBL in assists in the 1966–67 season and was named to the All-EPBL First Team that season.

In 1967, Weiss was a member of the Philadelphia 76ers' championship team.

=== Seattle SuperSonics ===
In the 1967 NBA expansion draft, he was selected by the Seattle SuperSonics. Weiss played in the NBA for twelve seasons, including six with the Chicago Bulls.

== NBA career statistics ==
Legend
GP	Games played	GS	Games started	MPG	Minutes per game
FG%	Field goal percentage	3P%	3-point field goal percentage	FT%	Free throw percentage
RPG	Rebounds per game	APG	Assists per game	SPG	Steals per game
BPG	Blocks per game	PPG	Points per game	**Bold**	Career high
†	Won an NBA championship	*	Led the league

=== Regular season ===
Year	Team	GP	GS	MPG	FG%	3P%	FT%	RPG	APG	SPG	BPG	PPG
1965–66	Philadelphia	7	–	4.3	.333	–	.000	1.0	0.6	–	–	0.9
1966–67†	Philadelphia	6	–	4.8	**.500**	–	.400	0.5	1.7	–	–	2.0
1967–68	Seattle	**82**	–	19.7	.430	–	.839	1.8	4.2	–	–	9.8
1968–69	Milwaukee	15	–	16.1	.316	–	.794	1.8	1.8	–	–	6.6
1968–69	Chicago	62	–	19.9	.397	–	.802	2.2	2.8	–	–	6.6
1969–70	Chicago	**82***	–	**31.0**	.427	–	**.842**	**2.8**	**5.8**	–	–	**11.5**
1970–71	Chicago	**82**	–	27.3	.422	–	.840	2.3	4.7	–	–	9.5
1971–72	Chicago	**82**	–	29.9	.430	–	.835	2.1	4.6	–	–	11.3
1972–73	Chicago	**82***	–	25.4	.426	–	.841	1.8	3.6	–	–	8.7
1973–74	Chicago	79	–	21.6	.466	–	.835	1.3	3.8	**1.3**	0.2	8.5
1974–75	Buffalo	76	–	17.6	.391	–	.806	1.4	3.4	1.1	**0.3**	3.4
1975–76	Buffalo	66	–	15.1	.486	–	.729	1.0	2.3	0.7	0.2	3.2
1976–77	Washington	62	–	12.4	.466	–	.784	1.1	2.1	0.9	0.1	2.5
Career		783	–	22.1	.428	–	.828	1.8	3.7	1.0	0.2	7.6

=== Playoffs ===
Year	Team	GP	GS	MPG	FG%	3P%	FT%	RPG	APG	SPG	BPG	PPG
1966–67†	Philadelphia	1	–	4.0	**.667**	–	.000	2.0	2.0	–	–	4.0
1969–70	Chicago	5	–	24.2	.424	–	.800	1.2	4.8	–	–	11.6
1970–71	Chicago	7	–	**35.7**	.457	–	.867	2.6	**8.1**	–	–	**15.7**
1971–72	Chicago	4	–	29.8	.490	–	.875	**3.3**	3.0	–	–	13.8
1972–73	Chicago	7	–	25.0	.430	–	.762	2.3	2.1	–	–	12.0
1973–74	Chicago	**11**	–	22.8	.311	–	**1.000**	1.8	2.9	**0.6**	**0.1**	4.7
1974–75	Buffalo	7	–	16.1	.478	–	.667	1.0	2.4	**0.6**	**0.1**	4.3
1975–76	Buffalo	7	–	5.1	.375	–	.667	0.6	0.4	0.3	0.0	1.1
1976–77	Washington	4	–	8.5	.600	–	.000	0.8	0.5	0.3	0.0	1.5
Career		53	–	20.8	.426	–	.802	1.7	3.1	0.5	0.1	7.7

== Coaching career ==
=== NBA ===
After retiring as a player in 1977, Weiss briefly worked for an investment firm in Anaheim, California. In 1978, he joined the San Diego Clippers as an assistant coach. In 1980, he moved to the Dallas Mavericks, an expansion franchise.

After six years in Dallas, Weiss accepted his first head coaching job in 1986 with the San Antonio Spurs. He coached the Spurs for two seasons, never posting a winning record. He did, however, lead them to the playoffs in 1988.

After one year as an assistant with the Orlando Magic, Weiss moved to the Atlanta Hawks as head coach. In three seasons, his Hawks teams posted a record of 124–122 and made the playoffs twice.

Weiss left the Hawks in 1993. He spent one year as head coach of the Los Angeles Clippers before joining the SuperSonics as an assistant coach. He served in that post for 12 years under both George Karl and Nate McMillan, going to the NBA Finals in 1996. He was promoted to head coach in 2005 after McMillan left for the Portland Trail Blazers. However, Weiss did not last even one season, as the Sonics struggled to a losing record. After a 13–17 start to the 2005–06 season, his three-year deal was terminated on January 3, 2006, and he was replaced with Bob Hill.

=== China ===
In 2008, Weiss went to China to coach the Shanxi Brave Dragons in the Chinese Basketball Association. He also coached for the Shandong Lions.

=== Return to NBA ===
In 2012, Weiss joined the Atlanta Hawks' coaching staff. The next year, he became an assistant with the Charlotte Bobcats. In 2017, he was hired by the Denver Nuggets as an assistant coach.

== Head coaching record ==
Legend
Regular season	G	Games coached	W	Games won	L	Games lost	W–L %	Win–loss %
Playoffs	PG	Playoff games	PW	Playoff wins	PL	Playoff losses	PW–L %	Playoff win–loss %

Team	Year	G	W	L	W–L%	Finish	PG	PW	PL	PW–L%	Result
San Antonio	1986–87	82	28	54	.250	6th in Midwest	—	—	—	—	Missed playoffs
San Antonio	1987–88	82	31	51	.378	5th in Midwest	3	0	3	.000	Lost in First Round
Atlanta	1990–91	82	43	39	.524	4th in Central	5	2	3	.400	Lost in First Round
Atlanta	1991–92	82	38	44	.463	5th in Central	—	—	—	—	Missed playoffs
Atlanta	1992–93	82	43	39	.524	4th in Central	3	0	3	.000	Lost in First Round
L.A. Clippers	1993–94	82	27	55	.329	7th in Pacific	—	—	—	—	Missed playoffs
Seattle	2005–06	30	13	17	.433	(fired)	—	—	—	—	—
Career		522	223	299	.427		11	2	9	.182	
