= James Garvin (basketball) =

American basketball player

Personal information
- Born: February 5, 1950 (age 76)
- Listed height: 6 ft 7 in (2.01 m)
- Listed weight: 200 lb (91 kg)

Career information
- High school: Phelps (Washington, D.C.)
- College: Boston University (1970–1973)
- NBA draft: 1973: 17th round, 204th overall pick
- Drafted by: Buffalo Braves
- Position: Power forward
- Number: 30

Career history
- 1973: Buffalo Braves
- 1973-1974: Scranton Apollos
- Stats at NBA.com
- Stats at Basketball Reference

James D. Garvin (born February 5, 1950) is an American former basketball player who had a brief career in the National Basketball Association (NBA).

A 6'7" forward from Boston University, Garvin was selected by the Buffalo Braves in the 17th round of the 1973 NBA draft and by the Kentucky Colonels in the second round of the 1973 American Basketball Association supplemental draft. He played 6 games for the Braves during the 1973–74 NBA season, averaging 0.3 points and 0.8 rebounds per game. Garvin was the only player taken in the last 9 rounds of the 1973 draft who actually appeared in an NBA game.

Garvin later played in the Eastern Basketball Association (EBA) for the Scranton Apollos in 1973-74 season.

Garvin was inducted into the Boston University Athletic Hall of Fame in 1995.

== Career statistics ==
Legend
GP	Games played	GS	Games started	MPG	Minutes per game
FG%	Field goal percentage	3P%	3-point field goal percentage	FT%	Free throw percentage
RPG	Rebounds per game	APG	Assists per game	SPG	Steals per game
BPG	Blocks per game	PPG	Points per game	**Bold**	Career high

=== NBA ===
==== Regular season ====
Year	Team	GP	MPG	FG%	FT%	RPG	APG	SPG	BPG	PPG
1973–74	Buffalo	6	1.8	.250	–	.8	.0	.0	.0	.3
