= Phil Hankinson =

American basketball player

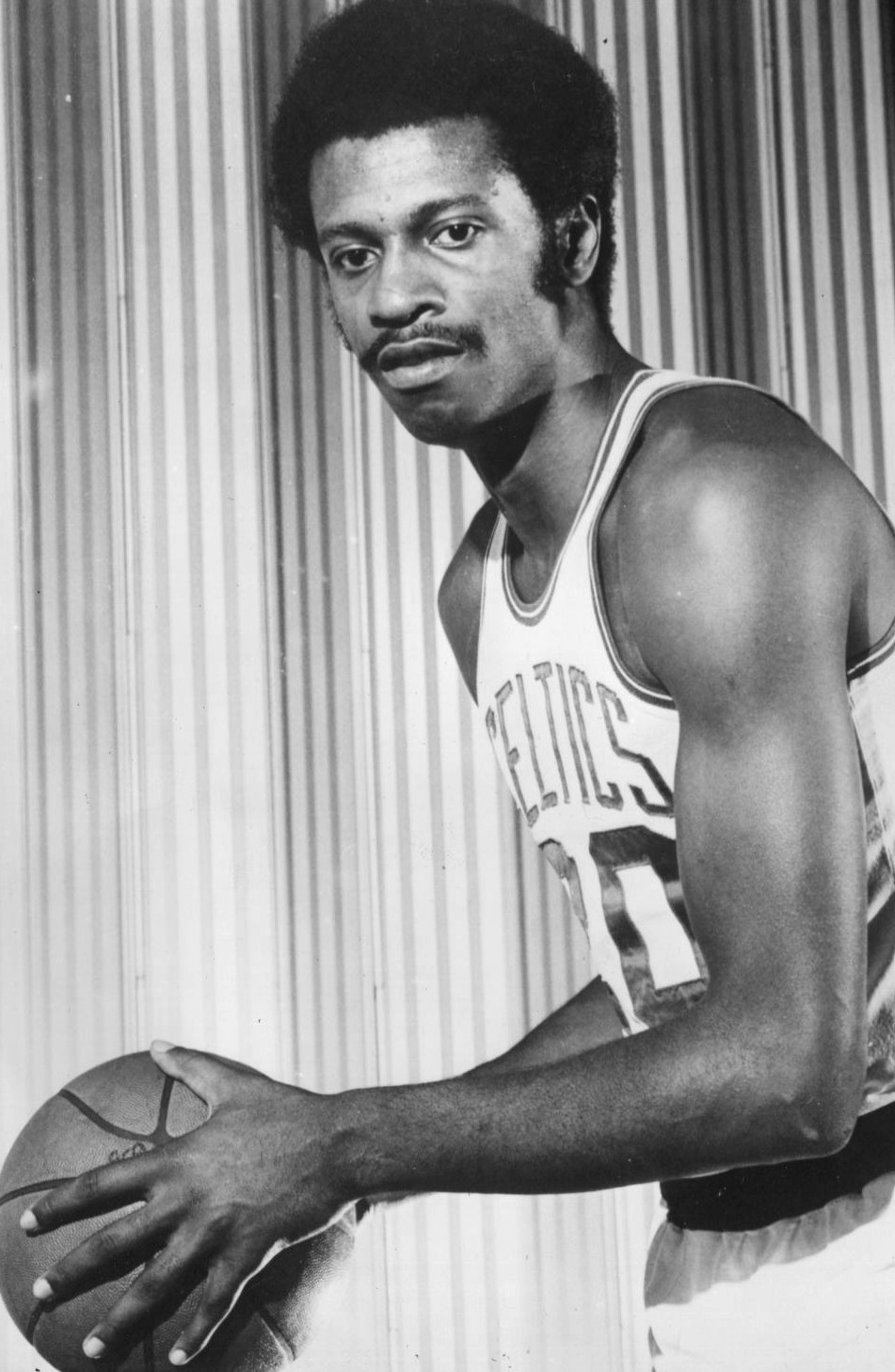

Personal information
- Born: July 26, 1951 Augusta, Georgia
- Died: November 19, 1996 (aged 45) Shelby County, Kentucky
- Listed height: 6 ft 8 in (2.03 m)
- Listed weight: 195 lb (88 kg)

Career information
- High school: Great Neck (Great Neck, New York)
- College: Penn (1970–1973)
- NBA draft: 1973: 2nd round, 35th overall pick
- Drafted by: Boston Celtics
- Playing career: 1973–1975
- Position: Power forward
- Number: 20

Career history
- 1973–1975: Boston Celtics

Career highlights
- NBA champion (1974)
- Stats at NBA.com
- Stats at Basketball Reference

Phil Hankinson (July 26, 1951 – November 19, 1996) was an American basketball player. He was born in Augusta, Georgia.

Hankinson attended what is now Great Neck North High School in Great Neck, New York, where he scored 28.7 points and pulled down 17 rebounds per game in 1968–69, his senior year.

A 6'8" forward, Hankinson played at the University of Pennsylvania from 1970 to 1973. He participated on three Ivy League championship teams that reached the NCAA Tournament, and he was named team MVP in 1973.

After college, Hankinson was selected by the Boston Celtics in the second round of the NBA draft. He appeared in two seasons with the Celtics before a knee injury ended his playing career. Hankinson held NBA career averages of 3.9 points per game and 1.8 rebounds per game. He also won an NBA championship ring with the Celtics in 1974.

In November 1996, Hankinson was found shot in his car in Kentucky, the victim of an apparent suicide. His father said that Hankinson had suffered from depression ever since his injury occurred.

== Career statistics ==
Legend
GP	Games played	GS	Games started	MPG	Minutes per game
FG%	Field goal percentage	3P%	3-point field goal percentage	FT%	Free throw percentage
RPG	Rebounds per game	APG	Assists per game	SPG	Steals per game
BPG	Blocks per game	PPG	Points per game	**Bold**	Career high
†	Won an NBA championship

=== NBA ===
==== Regular season ====
Year	Team	GP	MPG	FG%	FT%	RPG	APG	SPG	BPG	PPG
1973–74†	Boston	**28**	5.8	.485	**.769**	1.8	.1	.1	.0	3.9
1974–75	Boston	3	**8.0**	**.545**	–	**2.3**	**.7**	**.3**	.0	**4.0**
Career		31	6.0	.491	.769	1.8	.2	.1	.0	3.9

==== Playoffs ====
Year	Team	GP	MPG	FG%	FT%	RPG	APG	SPG	BPG	PPG
1974†	Boston	**2**	**2.5**	**.500**	**1.000**	.5	.0	.0	**.5**	**3.0**
1975	Boston	**2**	1.5	.333	–	**1.0**	.0	.0	.0	1.0
Career		4	2.0	.429	1.000	.8	.0	.0	.3	2.0
