= Ken Charles =

Trinidad and Tobago basketball player

Personal information
- Born: July 10, 1951 (age 75) Trinidad and Tobago
- Listed height: 6 ft 3 in (1.91 m)
- Listed weight: 180 lb (82 kg)

Career information
- High school: Brooklyn Preparatory School (Brooklyn, New York)
- College: Fordham (1970–1973)
- NBA draft: 1973: 3rd round, 38th overall pick
- Drafted by: Buffalo Braves
- Playing career: 1973–1977
- Position: Shooting guard
- Number: 14, 44

Career history

Playing
- 1973–1976: Buffalo Braves
- 1976–1977: Atlanta Hawks

Coaching
- 2000–2007: Brooklyn Kings

Career highlights
- As player: No. 44 retired by Fordham Rams; As coach: USBL Coach of the Year (2005)

Career NBA statistics
- Points: 2,747 (8.5 ppg)
- Rebounds: 640 (2.0 rpg)
- Assists: 806 (2.5 apg)
- Stats at NBA.com
- Stats at Basketball Reference

Kenneth M. Charles (born July 10, 1951) is a Trinidadian retired basketball player who played guard for the Buffalo Braves (1973–1976) and Atlanta Hawks (1976–1978). He was a 6-foot-3-inch (1.91 m), 180 pounds (82 kg) guard.

Charles was born on the island of Trinidad and moved to the United States when he was aged six. He played collegiately for Fordham University before being selected by the Braves in the third round (38th pick overall) of the 1973 NBA draft.

In 5 seasons he played in 322 games and played 7,637 minutes (23.7 per game), had a .441 field goal percentage (1,083 for 2,458), .789 free throw percentage (581 for 736), 640 rebounds (2.0 per game), 806 assists (2.5 per game), 407 steals (1.3 per game), 128 blocked shots (.4 per game) and 2,747 points (8.5 per game).

Charles was head coach of the Brooklyn Kings of the United States Basketball League (USBL) from 2000 to 2007. He won the USBL Coach of the Year Award in 2005.

== Career statistics ==
Legend
GP	Games played	GS	Games started	MPG	Minutes per game
FG%	Field goal percentage	3P%	3-point field goal percentage	FT%	Free throw percentage
RPG	Rebounds per game	APG	Assists per game	SPG	Steals per game
BPG	Blocks per game	PPG	Points per game	**Bold**	Career high

=== NBA ===
==== Regular season ====
Year	Team	GP	MPG	FG%	FT%	RPG	APG	SPG	BPG	PPG
1973–74	Buffalo	59	11.7	**.476**	.671	1.1	.9	.5	.2	3.9
1974–75	Buffalo	79	21.4	.466	.822	2.1	2.2	1.1	.5	7.6
1975–76	Buffalo	81	27.7	.456	.785	**2.7**	**2.5**	1.5	**.6**	10.1
1976–77	Atlanta	**82**	**30.3**	.414	.801	2.0	3.6	**1.7**	.5	**11.1**
1977–78	Atlanta	21	24.8	.397	**.840**	1.1	**3.9**	1.2	.2	9.0
Career		322	23.7	.441	.789	2.0	2.5	1.3	.4	8.5

==== Playoffs ====
Year	Team	GP	MPG	FG%	FT%	RPG	APG	SPG	BPG	PPG
1974	Buffalo	2	5.0	**.750**	–	1.0	.0	.0	.0	3.0
1975	Buffalo	7	**29.7**	.400	**.727**	1.9	**2.6**	**.9**	**.7**	**7.4**
1976	Buffalo	**9**	26.4	.400	.692	**2.9**	1.6	.8	**.7**	5.9
Career		18	25.3	.412	.708	2.3	1.8	.7	.6	6.2
