= 1974–75 Buffalo Braves season =

1974–75 basketball season for Buffalo Braves

- Head coach: Jack Ramsay
- Arena: Buffalo Memorial Auditorium; Maple Leaf Gardens

Results
- Record: 49–33 (.598)
- Place: Division: 2nd (Atlantic); Conference: 3rd (Eastern)
- Playoff finish: East Semifinals (lost to Bullets 3–4)
- Stats at Basketball Reference

Local media
- Television: WBEN-TV
- Radio: WBEN

The 1974–75 Buffalo Braves season was the fifth season of the club in the National Basketball Association. It was the team's third season under head coach Jack Ramsay. The team's home arena was the Buffalo Memorial Auditorium, with six "home" games played at Maple Leaf Gardens in Toronto.

Despite losing three key players in Gar Heard, Jim McMillian and Ernie DiGregorio for long stretches, the Braves continued to improve. Buffalo finished second in the Atlantic Division to Boston, with a record of 49–33 and a .598 winning percentage; this would endure as the club's best record for 37 years, until the twice-relocated Los Angeles Clippers amassed a 40–26 mark (.606) in the 2011–12 season. Bob McAdoo captured the NBA MVP Award, leading the league with 34.5 points per game, while adding 14.1 rebounds per contest, fourth-best in the NBA.

In the 1975 NBA Playoffs, the Braves earned the franchise's second playoff berth, this time against the Washington Bullets. The series went to the full seven games, with Washington taking the deciding contest, 115–96, at home. After the season, the team was occupied with legal wrangling surrounding the departure of minority owner and general manager Eddie Donovan.

== Offseason ==
On March 21, Braves general manager Eddie Donovan announced that he would resign effective April 1. The resignation was controversial because there were rumors that he would return to work for his prior team, New York Knicks, but there were simultaneous rumors that the Knicks had unfairly tampered with Donovan while under contract with the Braves. Upon the announced resignation, NBA Commissioner Walter Kennedy announced that the league would conduct a hearing on the matter. The transition was complicated by Donovan's 5% ownership of the Braves. Incoming commissioner, Larry O'Brien announced an amicable settlement as one of his first orders of business.

=== NBA draft ===
The following members of the 1974–75 Buffalo Braves were drafted during the 1974 NBA draft. McMillen played for a year in Europe before joining the 1975–76 Buffalo Braves. He played for a team in Bologna, Italy.

Round	Pick	Player	Position	Nationality	College
1	9	Tom McMillen	Center	United States	Maryland
3	45	Kim Hughes	Center	United States	Wisconsin
4	63	Bernie Harris	Forward	United States	Virginia Commonwealth
5	81	Tony Byers	Guard	United States	Wake Forest
6	99	Gary Link	Forward	United States	Missouri
7	117	Tommy Curtis	Guard	United States	UCLA
8	135	Glenn Price	Forward	United States	St. Bonaventure
9	153	John Falconi	Guard	United States	Davidson
10	170	Andy Rimol	Forward	United States	Princeton

== Roster ==
1974–75 Buffalo Braves roster
Players

Pos.	No.	Player	Height	Weight	DOB	From
G	14	Ken Charles	6 ft 3 in (1.91 m)	180 lb (82 kg)		Fordham
G	15	Ernie DiGregorio	6 ft 0 in (1.83 m)	180 lb (82 kg)		Providence
F	34	Bernie Harris	6 ft 10 in (2.08 m)	200 lb (91 kg)		VCU
F	24	Gar Heard	6 ft 6 in (1.98 m)	220 lb (100 kg)		Oklahoma
F	42	Jack Marin	6 ft 6 in (1.98 m)	210 lb (95 kg)		Duke
C	11	Bob McAdoo	6 ft 9 in (2.06 m)	210 lb (95 kg)		North Carolina
F	5	Jim McMillian	6 ft 5 in (1.96 m)	220 lb (100 kg)		Columbia
C	22	Paul Ruffner	6 ft 11 in (2.11 m)	225 lb (102 kg)		BYU
C	54	Dale Schlueter	6 ft 10 in (2.08 m)	235 lb (107 kg)		Colorado State
G	9	Randy Smith	6 ft 3 in (1.91 m)	185 lb (84 kg)		Buffalo State
F	12	Jim Washington	6 ft 6 in (1.98 m)	210 lb (95 kg)		Villanova
G	8	Bob Weiss	6 ft 3 in (1.91 m)	185 lb (84 kg)		Penn State
G	3	Lee Winfield	6 ft 2 in (1.88 m)	174 lb (79 kg)		North Texas

Coaches
Head coach
- Jack Ramsay

Legend
- (DP) Unsigned draft pick
- (FA) Free agent
- (S) Suspended
- Injured

=== Roster notes ===
- Forward Bernie Harris played in only 11 games before being waived in January.
- Guard Bob Weiss came back to the franchise as an assistant coach with the San Diego Clippers from 1978 to 1980 and as a coach for the Los Angeles Clippers from 1993 to 1994.

== Regular season ==
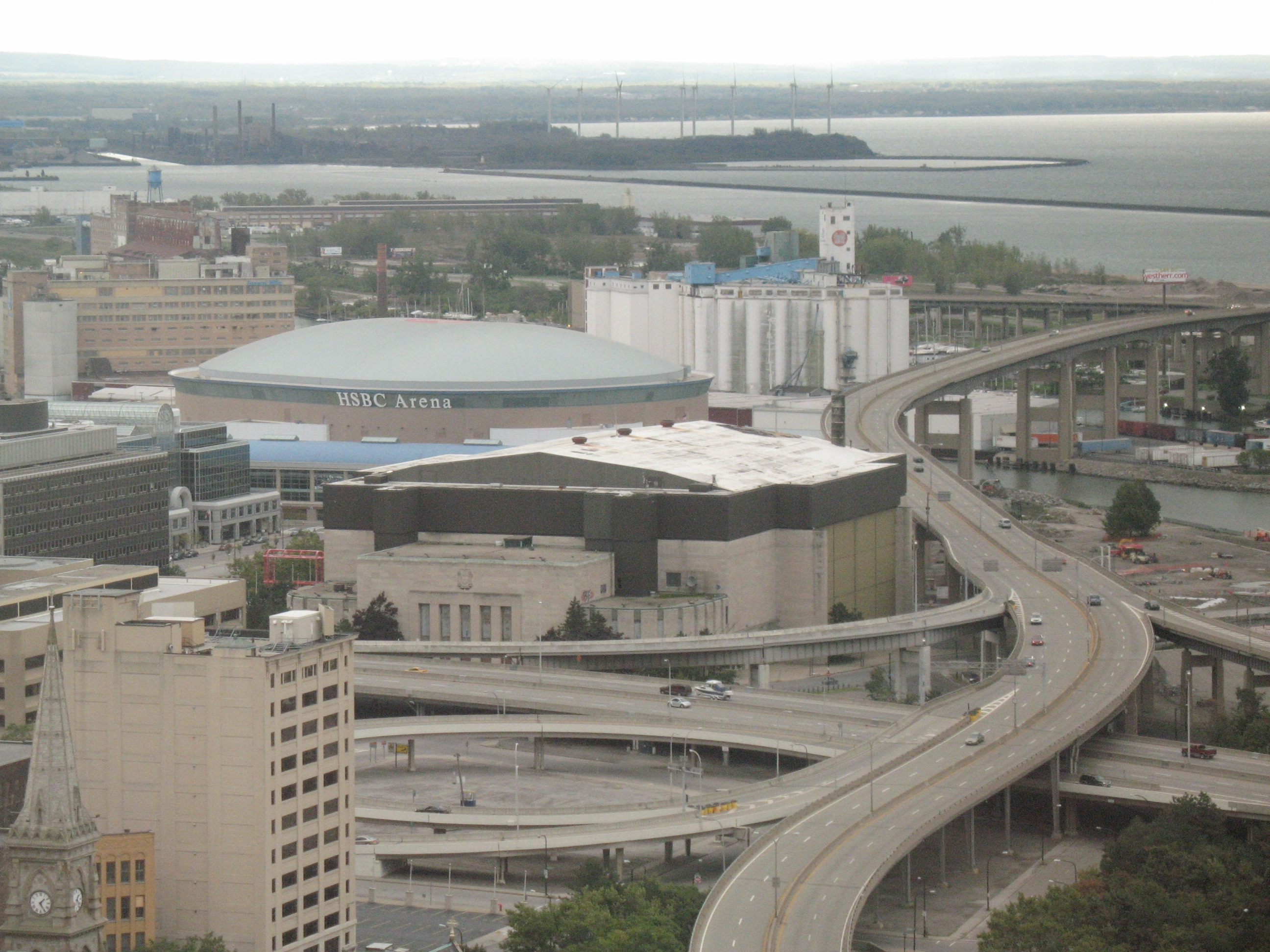
The Braves played most of their home games in the Buffalo Memorial Auditorium (dark-rimmed building in front of the HSBC Arena, pictured in 2007).

Overview

An early eleven-game winning streak helped the Braves achieve a 16–4 record to start the season and a later seven-game streak took them to 31–16. Buffalo supplanted the New York Knicks as Boston's closest competitor in the Atlantic foursome with 49 wins and 33 losses. Buffalo boasted high-scoring super star Bob McAdoo, who posted a 34.5 scoring average to lead the NBA, while making more field goals than any other player. He also led in minutes played, while also ranking among the best rebounders and shot blockers in the league. McAdoo also earned 798 free throw tries, another league high, converting 81% of his attempts. The Braves lost reigning NBA Rookie of the Year Ernie DiGregorio to a knee injury that limited him to 31 games, watched former Laker Jim McMillian battle illness that caused him to miss 20 games, and also lost Gar Heard for 15 games, which dropped the team from the elite and put more of the load on their star. The Braves attendance increased by 40,000 to 467,267 in their 41 home games, but the team fell to 5th of 18 teams. The team defense improved sufficiently to create an average 2.2-point scoring margin after a slight average deficit the year before.

McMillian ranked tenth in the league in field goal percentage. Heard ranked 9th in blocks per game (1.8). Jack Marin, who played in 81 games, ranked seventh in free throw percentage (86.9%). Randy Smith, who played in all 82 regular-season games for the third consecutive season, finished fourth in assists per game (6.5). McAdoo, who also played all 82 games, led the NBA in minutes played, field goals, rebounds (ranked fourth per game), points, and points per game. Meanwhile, he ranked sixth in blocks per game, second in total free throws, and fifth in field goal percentage. This performance earned him the league MVP and first team All-NBA honors.

=== October–November ===
As he had the season before, DiGregorio had a tremendous opening night with 33 points. The Braves defeated the defending champion Boston Celtics 126–119, giving them their first win in nine games against Boston as a visitor. The Celtics had eliminated the Braves from the 1975 NBA Playoffs. DiGregorio was sidelined after six games due to knee surgery. After a 4–3 start, the Braves won eleven in a row starting with a November 3, 1974, victory over the Los Angeles Lakers at the Los Angeles Forum and culminating with a November 23 victory over the Phoenix Suns at home. In order to win the eighth game of the streak, the Braves had to overcome a seventeen-point deficit to earn a 111–106 victory against the Golden State Warriors. Even after losing to the Chicago Bulls on November 24, their 15–4 record was the best in the NBA.

=== December–January ===
During December, the Braves dealt with injuries to McMillan, who required an emergency appendectomy, and DiGregorio. After their great start, the Braves compiled a 6–7 month of December. On December 19, despite 49 points by McAdoo, the Braves lost to the Cleveland Cavaliers. On December 28, the NBA's smallest player, Calvin Murphy scored a career-high 45 points to lead the Houston Rockets to a 125–117 victory over Buffalo. By January, Heard was suffering from a knee injury. As a result, in some games, the Braves only played seven players. In a January 3 game against the Detroit Pistons, Dale Schlueter was involved in two altercations that resulted in bench-clearing brawls. In January 1975, the Braves recorded a seven-game winning streak starting with a January 10 win over the Cavaliers and ending with a January 24 victory over the New York Knicks. In the fifth game of the streak, McAdoo outscored Pete Maravich 43–40 at New Orleans.

=== February–April ===
Following an 11–4 January, the Braves struggled to a 7–7 record in February. On January 24, DiGregorio returned to the active roster following his October 29 knee cartilage injury. The March 13 victory against the Golden State Warriors established the franchise record for most wins in a season at 43, surpassing the prior season's total of 42. From March 14 to March 21, the Braves posted their season-worst four-game losing streak. Donovan announced his April 1 resignation in late March. In late March, DiGregorio was sidelined for the rest of the season. The Braves then went on a five-game winning streak from March 22 to March 29, but the team lost three of four April regular-season games.

=== Season standings ===
Atlantic Division	W	L	PCT	GB	Home	Road	Div
y-Boston Celtics	60	22	.732	–	28–13	32–9	17–9
x-Buffalo Braves	49	33	.598	11	30–11	19–22	15–11
x-New York Knicks	40	42	.488	20	23–18	17–24	9–17
Philadelphia 76ers	34	48	.415	26	20–21	14–27	11–15

#	Eastern Conference				
#	Team	W	L	PCT	GB
1	z-Boston Celtics	60	22	.732	–
2	y-Washington Bullets	60	22	.732	–
3	x-Buffalo Braves	49	33	.598	11
4	x-Houston Rockets	41	41	.500	19
5	x-New York Knicks	40	42	.488	20
6	Cleveland Cavaliers	40	42	.488	20
7	Philadelphia 76ers	34	48	.415	26
8	Atlanta Hawks	31	51	.378	29
9	New Orleans Jazz	23	59	.280	37

=== Season schedule ===
1974–75 game log
Total: 49–33 (home: 30–11; road: 19–22
October: 4–2 (home: 3–1; road: 1–1)

Game	Date	Team	Score	High points	High rebounds	High assists	Location Attendance	Record
1	October 18	@ Boston	126–119	Ernie DiGregorio (33)	Heard, McAdoo (11)	Ernie DiGregorio (9)	Boston Garden; 15,320	1–0
2	October 19	Boston	113–95	Bob McAdoo (21)	Bob McAdoo (14)	Ernie DiGregorio (7)	Buffalo Memorial Auditorium; 15,288	1–1
3	October 22	New Orleans	118–134	Bob McAdoo (33)	Bob McAdoo (22)	Ernie DiGregorio (7)	Buffalo Memorial Auditorium; 8,251	2–1
4	October 24	New York	91–111	Bob McAdoo (28)	Heard, McAdoo, Schlueter (12)	Ernie DiGregorio (8)	Maple Leaf Gardens; 5,981	3–1
5	October 26	Chicago	104–105	Bob McAdoo (41)	Bob McAdoo (19)	Ernie DiGregorio (10)	Buffalo Memorial Auditorium; 12,767	4–1
6	October 29	@ Golden State	101–130	Bob McAdoo (35)	Bob McAdoo (20)	Ernie DiGregorio (8)	Oakland-Alameda County Coliseum Arena; 4,221	4–2

November: 12–4 (home: 6–1; road: 6–3)

Game	Date	Team	Score	High points	High rebounds	High assists	Location Attendance	Record
7	November 1	@ Portland	106–113	Bob McAdoo (27)	Gar Heard (12)	Randy Smith (10)	Memorial Coliseum; 11,927	4–3
8	November 3	@ Los Angeles	124–101	Bob McAdoo (32)	Bob McAdoo (18)	Bob Weiss (9)	The Forum; 13,119	5–3
9	November 6	@ New Orleans	110–98	Bob McAdoo (41)	Gar Heard (13)	Bob Weiss (7)	Municipal Auditorium; 3,302	6–3
10	November 9	Detroit	100–109	Bob McAdoo (29)	Bob McAdoo (20)	Randy Smith (10)	Buffalo Memorial Auditorium; 12,113	7–3
11	November 10	@ Detroit	124–117	Bob McAdoo (27)	Gar Heard (13)	Randy Smith (10)	Cobo Arena; 4,301	8–3
12	November 12	Cleveland	94–112	Bob McAdoo (32)	Bob McAdoo (23)	Smith, Winfield (6)	Buffalo Memorial Auditorium; 7,664	9–3
13	November 14	@ Boston	112–100	Randy Smith (27)	Heard, McAdoo (11)	McAdoo, Weiss (5)	Providence Civic Center; 7,315	10–3
14	November 16	Kansas City–Omaha	96–101	Bob McAdoo (29)	Bob McAdoo (19)	Randy Smith (6)	Buffalo Memorial Auditorium; 8,274	11–3
15	November 19	Golden State	106–111	Bob McAdoo (43)	Bob McAdoo (19)	Randy Smith (9)	Buffalo Memorial Auditorium; 8,529	12–3
16	November 20	@ Washington	115–104	Randy Smith (28)	Heard, Marin, McAdoo (9)	Bob Weiss (8)	Capital Centre; 8,640	13–3
17	November 21	Philadelphia	95–99	Bob McAdoo (28)	Bob McAdoo (15)	Bob Weiss (8)	Maple Leaf Gardens; 5,467	14–3
18	November 23	Phoenix	104–117	Bob McAdoo (33)	Heard, Marin, McAdoo (11)	Bob Weiss (9)	Buffalo Memorial Auditorium; 12,743	15–3
19	November 24	@ Chicago	89–91	Bob McAdoo (31)	Bob McAdoo (18)	Bob Weiss (4)	Chicago Stadium; 13,346	15–4
20	November 26	@ Philadelphia	103–99	Bob McAdoo (46)	Gar Heard (15)	Lee Winfield (7)	The Spectrum; 8,110	16–4
21	November 29	Washington	96–93	Bob McAdoo (27)	Bob McAdoo (17)	Bob Weiss (4)	Buffalo Memorial Auditorium; 16,209	16–5
22	November 30	@ New York	111–118	Bob McAdoo (36)	Bob McAdoo (18)	Smith, Weiss (4)	Madison Square Garden; 19,694	16–6

December: 6–7 (home: 4–2; road: 2–5)

Game	Date	Team	Score	High points	High rebounds	High assists	Location Attendance	Record
23	December 3	Milwaukee	110–101	Bob McAdoo (37)	Gar Heard (16)	Gar Heard (5)	Buffalo Memorial Auditorium; 8,585	16–7
24	December 6	Portland	105–114	Bob McAdoo (38)	Bob McAdoo (18)	Bob Weiss (11)	Buffalo Memorial Auditorium; 10,724	17–7
25	December 7	@ Philadelphia	112–116	Bob McAdoo (34)	Bob McAdoo (13)	Randy Smith (8)	The Spectrum; 7,020	17–8
26	December 10	Philadelphia	91–101	Bob McAdoo (25)	Bob McAdoo (21)	McAdoo, Smith (5)	Buffalo Memorial Auditorium; 7,888	18–8
27	December 12	Houston	113–124	Bob McAdoo (32)	Dale Schlueter (10)	Randy Smith (13)	Maple Leaf Gardens; 4,519	19–8
28	December 13	New York	104–108	Bob McAdoo (42)	Bob McAdoo (23)	Charles, Heard, Smith (4)	Buffalo Memorial Auditorium; 12,774	20–8
29	December 14	@ New York	118–102	Bob McAdoo (37)	Bob McAdoo (15)	Gar Heard (7)	Madison Square Garden; 19,694	21–8
30	December 17	@ Kansas City–Omaha	110–111	Bob McAdoo (44)	Bob McAdoo (14)	Heard, Smith (6)	Kemper Arena; 5,179	21–9
31	December 19	@ Cleveland	104–106	Bob McAdoo (49)	Gar Heard (15)	Lee Winfield (4)	Richfield Coliseum; 6,876	21–10
32	December 20	Atlanta	113–102	Randy Smith (35)	Bob McAdoo (9)	Randy Smith (8)	Buffalo Memorial Auditorium; 7,843	21–11
33	December 27	@ Phoenix	108–92	McAdoo, McMillian (23)	Jack Marin (12)	Randy Smith (10)	Arizona Veterans Memorial Coliseum; 9,205	22–11
34	December 28	@ Houston	117–125	Bob McAdoo (35)	Bob McAdoo (12)	Randy Smith (14)	Hofheinz Pavilion; 5,447	22–12
35	December 30	@ Milwaukee	91–106	Bob McAdoo (29)	Bob McAdoo (10)	Randy Smith (7)	MECCA Arena; 10,938	22–13

January: 11–4 (home: 7–2; road: 4–2)

Game	Date	Team	Score	High points	High rebounds	High assists	Location Attendance	Record
36	January 3	Detroit	111–92	Bob McAdoo (29)	Bob McAdoo (11)	Randy Smith (6)	Buffalo Memorial Auditorium; 13,464	22–14
37	January 4	@ Atlanta	121–108	Bob McAdoo (47)	Bob McAdoo (15)	Randy Smith (6)	Omni Coliseum; 5,070	23–14
38	January 6	@ Philadelphia	95–101	McMillian, Smith (23)	Smith, Weiss (5)	Bob McAdoo (6)	The Spectrum; 8,186	23–15
39	January 7	Los Angeles	107–115	Bob McAdoo (44)	Bob McAdoo (18)	Randy Smith (9)	Buffalo Memorial Auditorium; 8,380	24–15
40	January 9	Boston	108–100	Bob McAdoo (30)	Bob McAdoo (11)	Randy Smith (7)	Maple Leaf Gardens; 13,544	24–16
41	January 10	Cleveland	100–104	Bob McAdoo (33)	Bob McAdoo (12)	Randy Smith (8)	Buffalo Memorial Auditorium; 10,875	25–16
42	January 12	Boston	101–114	Bob McAdoo (41)	Bob McAdoo (13)	Randy Smith (12)	Buffalo Memorial Auditorium; 15,377	26–16
43	January 17	Golden State	116–121	Bob McAdoo (43)	Bob McAdoo (17)	Randy Smith (11)	Buffalo Memorial Auditorium; 13,727	27–16
44	January 18	@ Atlanta	129–115	Bob McAdoo (32)	Jim Washington (16)	Bob Weiss (11)	Omni Coliseum; 9,501	28–16
45	January 19	@ New Orleans	117–112	Bob McAdoo (43)	Bob McAdoo (14)	Bob Weiss (6)	Loyola Field House; 4,214	29–16
46	January 21	Seattle	108–118	Bob McAdoo (49)	Bob McAdoo (19)	Randy Smith (10)	Buffalo Memorial Auditorium; 10,271	30–16
47	January 24	New York	99–105	Randy Smith (32)	Bob McAdoo (21)	Randy Smith (6)	Buffalo Memorial Auditorium; 18,194	31–16
48	January 26	@ Boston	93–107	Bob McAdoo (38)	Jim McMillian (11)	Randy Smith (6)	Boston Garden; 15,320	31–17
49	January 30	@ Cleveland	97–91	Bob McAdoo (37)	Bob McAdoo (12)	Randy Smith (5)	Richfield Coliseum; 8,046	32–17
50	January 31	Atlanta	101–111	Bob McAdoo (26)	Bob McAdoo (17)	Bob Weiss (5)	Buffalo Memorial Auditorium; 10,888	33–17

February: 7–7 (home: 4–4; road: 3–3)

Game	Date	Team	Score	High points	High rebounds	High assists	Location Attendance	Record
51	February 1	@ Detroit	113–119	Bob McAdoo (37)	Bob McAdoo (13)	DiGregorio, Smith (6)	Cobo Arena; 11,245	33–18
52	February 4	Philadelphia	111–105 (OT)	Bob McAdoo (39)	Bob McAdoo (9)	Randy Smith (6)	Buffalo Memorial Auditorium; 8,611	33–19
53	February 7	Los Angeles	98–108	Jack Marin (23)	Bob McAdoo (20)	Randy Smith (6)	Buffalo Memorial Auditorium; 10,742	34–19
54	February 9	@ Seattle	99–93 (OT)	Bob McAdoo (39)	Bob McAdoo (13)	Randy Smith (9)	Seattle Center Coliseum; 14,082	35–19
55	February 11	@ Los Angeles	112–108	Bob McAdoo (47)	Bob McAdoo (16)	Randy Smith (7)	The Forum; 14,114	36–19
56	February 12	@ Phoenix	96–108	Bob McAdoo (34)	Jim McMillian (11)	Randy Smith (6)	Arizona Veterans Memorial Coliseum; 6,255	36–20
57	February 14	Kansas City–Omaha	132–112	Bob McAdoo (36)	Gar Heard (9)	Randy Smith (7)	Buffalo Memorial Auditorium; 12,207	36–21
58	February 16	@ Chicago	109–114	Bob McAdoo (40)	Bob McAdoo (14)	Randy Smith (7)	Chicago Stadium; 15,972	36–22
59	February 18	Phoenix	109–124	Bob McAdoo (41)	Bob McAdoo (11)	Randy Smith (9)	Maple Leaf Gardens; 8,163	37–22
60	February 21	Portland	106–116	Bob McAdoo (35)	Jim McMillian (13)	Ernie DiGregorio (10)	Buffalo Memorial Auditorium; 12,202	38–22
61	February 22	@ New York	92–85	Bob McAdoo (27)	Bob McAdoo (20)	Randy Smith (8)	Madison Square Garden; 19,694	39–22
62	February 25	Washington	111–93	Bob McAdoo (33)	Bob McAdoo (18)	DiGregorio, Smith (7)	Buffalo Memorial Auditorium; 13,964	39–23
63	February 27	New Orleans	100–110	Bob McAdoo (34)	Gar Heard (15)	Randy Smith (6)	Maple Leaf Gardens; 5,578	40–23
64	February 28	New York	114–106	Bob McAdoo (41)	Randy Smith (7)	Randy Smith (9)	Buffalo Memorial Auditorium; 15,519	40–24

March: 8–6 (home: 5–0; road: 3–6)

Game	Date	Team	Score	High points	High rebounds	High assists	Location Attendance	Record
65	March 1	@ Milwaukee	100–104	Bob McAdoo (38)	Bob McAdoo (13)	Dale Schlueter (8)	MECCA Arena; 10,938	40–25
66	March 4	Seattle	97–104	Bob McAdoo (39)	Bob McAdoo (16)	Randy Smith (7)	Buffalo Memorial Auditorium; 12,665	41–25
67	March 6	@ Kansas City–Omaha	110–111	Randy Smith (28)	Bob McAdoo (16)	Randy Smith (7)	Kemper Arena; 8,644	41–26
68	March 8	Milwaukee	95–110	Bob McAdoo (33)	Gar Heard (16)	Ernie DiGregorio (10)	Buffalo Memorial Auditorium; 15,124	42–26
69	March 13	@ Golden State	122–103	Bob McAdoo (39)	Bob McAdoo (25)	Randy Smith (8)	Oakland-Alameda County Coliseum Arena; 12,787	43–26
70	March 14	@ Seattle	105–125	Bob McAdoo (27)	Bob McAdoo (7)	Randy Smith (5)	Seattle Center Coliseum; 14,082	43–27
71	March 16	@ Portland	95–102	Bob McAdoo (32)	Bob McAdoo (15)	Ernie DiGregorio (8)	Memorial Coliseum; 10,495	43–28
72	March 18	@ Houston	115–122	Bob McAdoo (51)	Bob McAdoo (20)	Randy Smith (9)	Hofheinz Pavilion; 8,627	43–29
73	March 21	@ Boston	101–109	Bob McAdoo (49)	Bob McAdoo (17)	DiGregorio, Smith (8)	Boston Garden; 15,320	43–30
74	March 22	Houston	112–117	Bob McAdoo (42)	Bob McAdoo (15)	Randy Smith (9)	Buffalo Memorial Auditorium; 18,164	44–30
75	March 25	Philadelphia	103–118	Bob McAdoo (48)	Bob McAdoo (20)	Heard, McMillian (5)	Buffalo Memorial Auditorium; 12,404	45–30
76	March 26	@ Washington	94–91	Bob McAdoo (34)	Bob McAdoo (17)	Randy Smith (10)	Capital Centre; 15,226	46–30
77	March 28	@ Philadelphia	115–104	Bob McAdoo (27)	Marin, McAdoo (7)	Randy Smith (9)	The Spectrum; 5,511	47–30
78	March 29	Boston	96–102	Bob McAdoo (31)	Gar Heard (13)	Randy Smith (9)	Buffalo Memorial Auditorium; 18,169	48–30

April: 1–3 (home: 1–1; road: 0–2)

Game	Date	Team	Score	High points	High rebounds	High assists	Location Attendance	Record
79	April 1	Chicago	98–93	Bob McAdoo (36)	Gar Heard (16)	Randy Smith (8)	Buffalo Memorial Auditorium; 12,888	48–31
80	April 2	@ Boston	92–95	Bob McAdoo (25)	Bob McAdoo (14)	Bob McAdoo (4)	Boston Garden; 12,391	48–32
81	April 4	Philadelphia	97–108	Bob McAdoo (37)	Gar Heard (18)	Randy Smith (11)	Buffalo Memorial Auditorium; 10,628	49–32
82	April 6	@ New York	93–105	Bob McAdoo (32)	Bob McAdoo (14)	Randy Smith (6)	Madison Square Garden; 19,694	49–33

Source: www.basketball-reference.com

== Playoffs ==
During the playoffs, the Braves captured home court advantage with a victory over the Washington Bullets in game 1 of the Eastern Conference Semifinals, but the Bullets returned the favor in game two. The home teams won the remaining games as Buffalo lost the series in seven games. DiGregorio missed the playoffs. McAdoo played 46.7 minutes per game during the playoffs and averaged 37.4 points, which both led the league. Heard averaged 11.7 points and 10.9 rebounds.

During the regular season the Bullets had been 36–5 (which was an NBA single-season record for home victories) at home, but lost both games to the Braves. The Braves then opened the series at the Capital Centre with a 113–102 victory in game 1. McAdoo was the game-high scorer with 35 and game-high rebounder with 14. The Bullets rebounded for a 120–106 victory in game 2 in Buffalo. Wes Unseld totaled 25 rebounds and Elvin Hayes added 16 as well as 34 points. Meanwhile, McAdoo, who had averaged 14.1 rebounds during the regular season only had 6. In game 3, Phil Chenier scored 18 points in the third quarter as the Bullets expanded a 53–52 lead to 81–70. Unseld had 18 rebounds and Hayes had 16 to go along with his 30 points. McAdoo had a game-high 34 and Smith added 26 in a losing effort. Before game 4, McAdoo received his hardware for his league MVP and league scoring title and responded that night with a 50-point performance as the Braves evened the series 2–2 with a 108–102 victory. Two nights later Hayes responded with 46 points, including 16 in the fourth quarter, as the Bullets completed a 97–93 comeback victory to regain the series lead 3–2. In the game, the score was tied at 89 with two minutes left when Nick Weatherspoon hit a 17-foot jumper to give the Bullets the lead for good. Chenier and Hayes built the lead up to 94–89 before McMillian made two short shots to bring the Braves back within 1 point in the final minute. An Unseld offensive rebound and putback of a Hayes miss gave the Bullets crucial points in the final seconds. On the night Hayes shot 19-for 26 and McAdoo countered with 34 points. In game 6, the Braves earned a 102–96 victory as McAdoo scored 9 of his 37 points in the final five minutes. The game had 19 tie scores, with the last being at 89. In game 7, Washington jumped to a 28–13 lead after one quarter behind 14 points by Chenier. Washington expanded the lead to 42–19 before closing the first half with a 56–38 lead. On the night, Chenier had a career-high 39 points in the 115–96 victory. McAdoo had 36 for Buffalo.

=== Playoff schedule ===
1975 playoff game log
Conference Semifinals: 3–4 (home: 2–1; road: 1–3)

Game	Date	Team	Score	High points	High rebounds	High assists	Location Attendance	Series
1	April 10	@ Washington	W 113–102	Bob McAdoo (35)	Bob McAdoo (14)	Randy Smith (9)	Capital Centre; 17,140	1–0
2	April 12	Washington	L 106–120	Bob McAdoo (36)	Gar Heard (10)	Randy Smith (7)	Buffalo Memorial Auditorium; 17,189	1–1
3	April 16	@ Washington	L 96–111	Bob McAdoo (34)	Bob McAdoo (19)	Randy Smith (7)	Capital Centre; 19,035	1–2
4	April 18	Washington	W 108–102	Bob McAdoo (50)	Bob McAdoo (21)	Randy Smith (10)	Buffalo Memorial Auditorium; 15,307	2–2
5	April 20	@ Washington	L 93–97	Bob McAdoo (34)	Gar Heard (14)	Heard, Smith (5)	Capital Centre; 18,820	2–3
6	April 23	Washington	W 102–96	Bob McAdoo (37)	Bob McAdoo (10)	Smith, Weiss (7)	Buffalo Memorial Auditorium; 15,172	3–3
7	April 25	@ Washington	L 96–115	Bob McAdoo (36)	Gar Heard (14)	Randy Smith (4)	Capital Centre; 19,035	3–4

1975 schedule

Source: www.basketball-reference.com

== Player stats ==
Legend
GP	Games played	MPG	Minutes per game	FG	Field-goals per game	FGA	Field-goals attempted per Game
FG%	Field-goal percentage	FT	Free-throws per game	FTA	Free-throws attempted per Game	FT%	Free-throw percentage
ORPG	Offensive rebounds per game	DRPG	Defensive rebounds per game	RPG	Rebounds per game	APG	Assists per game
SPG	Steals per game	BPG	Blocks per game	PFPG	Personal fouls per game	PPG	Points per game

Player	GP	MPG	FG	FGA	FG%	FT	FTA	FT%	ORPG	DRPG	RPG	APG	SPG	BPG	PFPG	PPG
Bob McAdoo	82	43.2	13.4	26.1	0.512	7.8	9.7	0.805	3.7	10.3	14.1	2.2	1.1	2.1	3.4	34.5
Randy Smith	82	36.6	7.4	15.4	0.484	2.9	3.6	0.8	1.2	3	4.2	6.5	1.7	0	3	17.8
Jim McMillian	62	34.4	5.6	11.2	0.499	3.1	3.7	0.84	2	4.2	6.2	2.5	1.1	0.2	2.1	14.3
Jack Marin	81	26.5	4.7	10.3	0.455	2.4	2.7	0.869	1.3	3.2	4.5	1.6	0.6	0.2	2.9	11.8
Gar Heard	67	32.1	4.7	12.2	0.388	1.6	2.8	0.564	2.8	7.2	9.9	2.8	1.6	1.8	3.6	11.1
Ernie DiGregorio	31	23	3.3	7.5	0.44	1.1	1.5	0.778	0.2	1.3	1.5	4.9	0.6	0	2	7.8
Ken Charles	79	21.4	3	6.5	0.466	1.5	1.8	0.822	0.9	1.2	2.1	2.2	1.1	0.3	2.1	7.6
Lee Winfield	68	18.5	2.4	4.6	0.526	0.7	1	0.721	0.7	1.2	1.9	2	0.6	0.4	1.6	5.5
Jim Washington	42	16	1.8	3.9	0.475	0.5	0.9	0.553	1.4	3.3	4.7	1	0.3	0.3	1.9	4.2
Dale Schlueter	76	12.7	1.2	2.3	0.517	1.1	1.6	0.694	1	2.4	3.5	1.4	0.2	0.6	2.1	3.5
Bob Weiss	76	17.6	1.3	3.4	0.391	0.7	0.9	0.806	0.3	1.1	1.4	3.4	1.1	0.3	1.9	3.4
Paul Ruffner	22	4.7	1	2.1	0.468	0	0.2	0.2	0.5	0.5	1	0.3	0.1	0.1	1	2
Bernie Harris	11	2.3	0.2	1	0.182	0.1	0.2	0.5	0.2	0.5	0.7	0.1	0	0.1	0	0.5

== Awards and honors ==
- Bob McAdoo, NBA Most Valuable Player
- Bob McAdoo, NBA Scoring Champion
- Bob McAdoo All-NBA Team (1st team)
- Bob McAdoo 1975 NBA All-Star Game

== Transactions ==
Prior to the season the team lost Bob Kauffman to the New Orleans Jazz in the May 20, 1974 NBA expansion draft.

On August 29, 1974, the Braves purchased Dale Schlueter from the Atlanta Hawks. On September 4, 1974, Matt Guokas was traded along with a 1977 NBA draft second round pick and a future second round draft pick to the Chicago Bulls for Bob Weiss. Bernie Harris was waived on January 20, 1975. Mike Macaluso did not return to play for the Braves and never played in the NBA again.

The Braves were involved in the following transactions during the 1974–75 season.

=== Trades ===
September 4, 1974
January 8, 1975
To Buffalo Braves

- Bob Weiss
To Buffalo Braves

- Jim Washington
To Chicago Bulls

- Matt Goukas
- 1977 2nd round draft pick
- Future 2nd round draft pick
To Atlanta Hawks

- 1976 5th round pick

=== Free agents ===
==== Additions ====
Player	Signed	Former team
Dale Schlueter	Purchased contract, August 29	Atlanta Hawks

==== Subtractions ====
Player	Left	New team
Bob Kauffman	expansion draft, May 20	New Orleans Jazz
Mike Macaluso	free agency, July 1	Israel Sabras
Bernie Harris	waived, January 20	Wilkes-Barre Barons
