= Jim McMillian =

American basketball player (1948–2016)

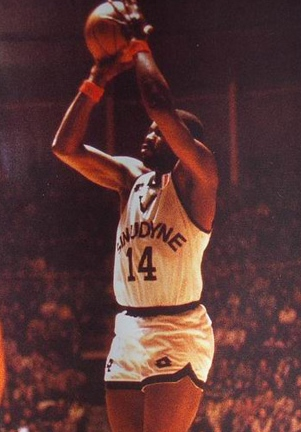

Personal information
- Born: March 11, 1948 Raeford, North Carolina, U.S.
- Died: May 16, 2016 (aged 68) Winston-Salem, North Carolina, U.S.
- Listed height: 6 ft 5 in (1.96 m)
- Listed weight: 215 lb (98 kg)

Career information
- High school: Thomas Jefferson (Brooklyn, New York)
- College: Columbia (1967–1970)
- NBA draft: 1970: 1st round, 13th overall pick
- Drafted by: Los Angeles Lakers
- Playing career: 1970–1981
- Position: Small forward
- Number: 5

Career history
- 1970–1973: Los Angeles Lakers
- 1973–1976: Buffalo Braves
- 1976–1978: New York Knicks
- 1978–1979: Portland Trail Blazers
- 1979–1981: Sinudyne Bologna

Career highlights
- NBA champion (1972); Italian League champion (1980); First-team All-American – USBWA (1969); 2× Second-team All-American – NABC (1969, 1970); Third-team All-American – UPI (1969); Third-team All-American – AP (1970); 3× First-team All-Ivy League (1968–1970); 3× Haggerty Award (1968–1970); First-team Parade All-American (1966)

Career NBA statistics
- Points: 8,736 (13.8 ppg)
- Rebounds: 3,319 (5.3 rpg)
- Assists: 1,557 (2.5 apg)
- Stats at NBA.com
- Stats at Basketball Reference

James M. McMillian (March 11, 1948 – May 16, 2016) was an American professional basketball player. After starring at Thomas Jefferson High School in Brooklyn, McMillian played college basketball for the Columbia Lions. He led Columbia to a three-year mark of 63–14, and their last NCAA Tournament appearance in 1968, his sophomore year. The tourney ended with a third-place finish for Columbia in the East regional, and Columbia ended that 1967–68 season the sixth-ranked college team in the nation.

"Jimmy Mac" not only was a three-time All-American and All-Ivy Leaguer, he was All-East each year, the ECAC Sophomore of the Year, and became the first person to earn the Haggerty Award in each of his three varsity seasons. He is also known for doing a reverse behind the back layup in the 1972 NBA Finals, winning the 1972 championship in the end.

He scored 1,758 career points then a record, now second and averaged 22.9 points per game second-best then and now. McMillian is also second in career rebounds (743) and holds the season records for field goals in a season (253) and career (677). But despite their outstanding winning percentages, his Columbia teams managed only one Ivy League title in a period when they battled tough Princeton teams with Geoff Petrie and John Hummer and Penn teams with Dave Wohl and Corky Calhoun.

A 6 ft 5 in (1.96 m) tall forward, he was drafted in the first round as the 13th overall pick by the Los Angeles Lakers of the NBA and was also a pick of the Utah Stars of the ABA. He chose the Lakers and spent three years there, scoring 3,714 points, an average of 15.3 per game. In 1972, he helped lead the Lakers to an NBA Championship, averaging 19.1 points per game in the playoffs. He was a key factor in the Lakers' record-setting 33-game winning streak that season. McMillian, who was in his second season that year, replaced Elgin Baylor at forward and the team immediately launched their streak. After the retirement of Wilt Chamberlain, the Lakers needed a center and traded McMillian to the Buffalo Braves for Elmore Smith. He later played for the New York Knicks and Portland Trail Blazers.

At the end of his career he moved to Italy and played for Sinudyne Bologna for two seasons winning two Italian titles and reaching the final of the European Champions' Cup in 1981 where he did not play due to a serious injury.

McMillian's younger brother, Lloyd, played college basketball for the Loyola Marymount Lions and Long Beach State 49ers.

McMillian died from complications of heart failure on May 16, 2016.

== NBA career statistics ==
Legend
GP	Games played	GS	Games started	MPG	Minutes per game
FG%	Field goal percentage	3P%	3-point field goal percentage	FT%	Free throw percentage
RPG	Rebounds per game	APG	Assists per game	SPG	Steals per game
BPG	Blocks per game	PPG	Points per game	**Bold**	Career high
†	Won an NBA championship	*	Led the league

=== Regular season ===
Year	Team	GP	GS	MPG	FG%	3P%	FT%	RPG	APG	SPG	BPG	PPG
1970–71	L.A. Lakers	81	—	21.6	.459	—	.769	4.1	1.6	—	—	8.4
1971–72†	L.A. Lakers	80	—	38.1	.482	—	.791	6.5	2.6	—	—	18.8
1972–73	L.A. Lakers	81	—	36.5	.458	—	.845	5.5	2.7	—	—	**18.9**
1973–74	Buffalo	**82***	—	**40.5**	.494	—	**.858**	**7.4**	**3.1**	**1.6**	**.3**	18.6
1974–75	Buffalo	62	—	34.4	.499	—	.840	6.2	2.5	1.1	.2	14.3
1975–76	Buffalo	74	—	35.3	**.536**	—	**.858**	5.3	2.8	1.2	.2	15.8
1976–77	New York	67	60	32.2	.464	—	.779	4.6	2.1	.9	.1	9.9
1977–78	New York	81	**63**	24.4	.462	—	**.858**	3.6	2.5	.9	.2	8.5
1978–79	Portland	23	—	12.1	.446	—	.810	1.7	1.4	.4	.1	3.6
Career		631	123	32.1	.482	—	.832	5.3	2.5	1.1	.2	13.8

=== Playoffs ===
Year	Team	GP	GS	MPG	FG%	3P%	FT%	RPG	APG	SPG	BPG	PPG
1971	L.A. Lakers	12	—	**43.5**	.436	—	.676	5.4	1.8	—	—	15.1
1972†	L.A. Lakers	15	—	41.6	.447	—	.857	5.7	1.5	—	—	19.1
1973	L.A. Lakers	**17**	—	37.1	.466	—	.733	4.8	**2.2**	—	—	**20.1**
1974	Buffalo	6	—	37.3	.413	—	.688	**8.8**	2.0	.7	.2	14.5
1975	Buffalo	7	—	34.3	.453	—	**.929**	4.9	2.0	**1.6**	.3	13.0
1976	Buffalo	9	—	38.7	**.473**	—	.868	4.1	2.1	**1.6**	**.4**	17.2
1978	New York	6	—	22.3	.453	—	.833	3.5	1.8	1.2	.0	8.8
Career		72	—	37.8	.451	—	.791	5.2	1.9	1.3	.3	16.6
