= 1973–74 Boston Celtics season =

NBA basketball team season (won NBA championship)

- NBA champions
- Conference champions
- Division champions
- Head coach: Tom Heinsohn
- General manager: Red Auerbach
- Arena: Boston Garden

Results
- Record: 56–26 (.683)
- Place: Division: 1st (Atlantic); Conference: 1st (Eastern)
- Playoff finish: NBA champions (Defeated Bucks 4–3)
- Stats at Basketball Reference

Local media
- Television: WBZ-TV
- Radio: WBZ (Johnny Most, Len Berman)

The 1973–74 Boston Celtics season was their 28th in the National Basketball Association (NBA). The Celtics won their 12th title, defeating the Milwaukee Bucks of Kareem Abdul-Jabbar in a seven-game series. The Celtics also won their division for the third consecutive season. This was their 13th finals appearance, and first since 1968–69.

The 1974 NBA Finals were a closely-matched series, with two overtime games and requiring all seven games of the best-of-seven series to be played. Game 6 was especially intense, with Milwaukee winning on Kareem Abdul-Jabbar's skyhook with three seconds left in double overtime. However, Boston won handily in Game 7, 102-87.

== Roster ==
1973–74 Boston Celtics roster
Players

Pos.	No.	Player	Height	Weight	DOB	From
SG	12	Don Chaney	6 ft 5 in (1.96 m)	210 lb (95 kg)	1946-03-22	Houston
C	18	Dave Cowens	6 ft 9 in (2.06 m)	230 lb (104 kg)	1948-10-25	Florida State
C	32	Steve Downing	6 ft 8 in (2.03 m)	225 lb (102 kg)	1950-09-09	Indiana
C	29	Henry Finkel	7 ft 0 in (2.13 m)	240 lb (109 kg)	1942-04-20	Dayton
SF	20	Phil Hankinson	6 ft 8 in (2.03 m)	195 lb (88 kg)	1951-07-26	Penn
F	17	John Havlicek	6 ft 5 in (1.96 m)	203 lb (92 kg)	1940-04-08	Ohio State
C	33	Steve Kuberski	6 ft 8 in (2.03 m)	215 lb (98 kg)	1947-11-06	Bradley
F	19	Don Nelson	6 ft 6 in (1.98 m)	210 lb (95 kg)	1940-05-15	Iowa
F	35	Paul Silas	6 ft 7 in (2.01 m)	220 lb (100 kg)	1943-07-12	Creighton
SG	44	Paul Westphal	6 ft 4 in (1.93 m)	195 lb (88 kg)	1950-11-30	USC
G	10	Jo Jo White	6 ft 3 in (1.91 m)	190 lb (86 kg)	1946-11-16	Kansas
PG	7	Art Williams	6 ft 1 in (1.85 m)	180 lb (82 kg)	1939-09-29	Cal Poly Pomona

Coaches
Head coach
- Tom Heinsohn

Legend
- (DP) Unsigned draft pick
- (FA) Free agent
- (S) Suspended
- Injured

Roster

== Regular season ==
=== Season standings ===
Atlantic Division	W	L	PCT	GB	Home	Road	Neutral	Div
y-Boston Celtics	56	26	.683	–	26–6	21–18	9–2	17–5
x-New York Knicks	49	33	.598	7	28–13	21–19	0–1	10–12
x-Buffalo Braves	42	40	.512	14	19–13	17–21	6–6	12–10
Philadelphia 76ers	25	57	.305	31	14–23	9–30	2–4	5–17

#	Eastern Conference				
#	Team	W	L	PCT	GB
1	z-Boston Celtics	56	26	.683	–
2	x-New York Knicks	49	33	.598	7
3	y-Capital Bullets	47	35	.573	9
4	x-Buffalo Braves	42	40	.512	14
5	Atlanta Hawks	35	47	.427	21
6	Houston Rockets	32	50	.390	24
7	Cleveland Cavaliers	29	53	.354	27
8	Philadelphia 76ers	25	57	.305	31

=== Game log ===
1973–74 game log
#	Date	Opponent	Score	High points	Record
1	October 12	Buffalo	112–118	Paul Silas (31)	1–0
2	October 13	@ Philadelphia	111–106	Jo Jo White (33)	2–0
3	October 19	Philadelphia	102–133	Steve Kuberski (21)	3–0
4	October 20	@ Capital	87–96	Dave Cowens (19)	3–1
5	October 24	Houston	132–117	Jo Jo White (33)	3–2
6	October 26	New York	101–113	John Havlicek (34)	4–2
7	October 28	@ Cleveland	99–102	John Havlicek (25)	4–3
8	October 31	Cleveland	110–128	Cowens, White (21)	5–3
9	November 2	Golden State	105–108	Dave Cowens (25)	6–3
10	November 3	@ Atlanta	122–109	John Havlicek (30)	7–3
11	November 8	@ New York	94–84	John Havlicek (20)	8–3
12	November 9	Phoenix	107–122	Jo Jo White (25)	9–3
13	November 10	N Detroit	97–102	John Havlicek (32)	10–3
14	November 14	Seattle	104–110	Jo Jo White (28)	11–3
15	November 16	Milwaukee	90–105	Dave Cowens (26)	12–3
16	November 17	@ Kansas City–Omaha	123–110	Jo Jo White (30)	13–3
17	November 23	Kansas City–Omaha	102–119	John Havlicek (25)	14–3
18	November 25	@ Cleveland	107–101	John Havlicek (25)	15–3
19	November 28	Capital	104–111	John Havlicek (24)	16–3
20	November 30	@ Milwaukee	93–117	Dave Cowens (22)	16–4
21	December 1	Chicago	98–120	John Havlicek (29)	17–4
22	December 5	New York	97–119	John Havlicek (25)	18–4
23	December 7	Atlanta	112–116	Cowens, Havlicek (24)	19–4
24	December 8	@ Chicago	95–112	Cowens, Kuberski (13)	19–5
25	December 9	N Buffalo	114–118	Jo Jo White (37)	20–5
26	December 12	N Buffalo	119–126	Jo Jo White (32)	21–5
27	December 14	@ Houston	114–106	John Havlicek (31)	22–5
28	December 15	@ Phoenix	120–121	Dave Cowens (21)	22–6
29	December 16	@ Los Angeles	115–110	Dave Cowens (35)	23–6
30	December 18	@ Golden State	125–106	Jo Jo White (28)	24–6
31	December 21	@ Portland	124–120 (OT)	Dave Cowens (27)	25–6
32	December 23	@ Seattle	96–95	John Havlicek (22)	26–6
33	December 26	@ Buffalo	125–123	John Havlicek (27)	27–6
34	December 29	N Cleveland	92–111	John Havlicek (19)	28–6
35	December 31	Philadelphia	97–106	Dave Cowens (23)	29–6
36	January 2	@ Kansas City–Omaha	97–109	Jo Jo White (22)	29–7
37	January 4	@ Detroit	101–106	Jo Jo White (32)	29–8
38	January 5	N Philadelphia	102–108 (OT)	John Havlicek (30)	30–8
39	January 9	Chicago	89–106	Don Nelson (24)	31–8
40	January 11	Los Angeles	111–103	John Havlicek (26)	31–9
41	January 13	@ Atlanta	128–105	Dave Cowens (29)	32–9
42	January 18	Atlanta	94–98	John Havlicek (26)	33–9
43	January 20	Golden State	123–102	Dave Cowens (24)	33–10
44	January 23	Seattle	98–97	Dave Cowens (32)	33–11
45	January 25	Philadelphia	97–112	John Havlicek (24)	34–11
46	January 27	Kansas City–Omaha	98–119	Havlicek, White (16)	35–11
47	January 29	@ New York	83–104	Dave Cowens (21)	35–12
48	January 30	Cleveland	108–120	Jo Jo White (27)	36–12
49	February 1	N Philadelphia	105–106	John Havlicek (30)	37–12
50	February 3	Capital	112–99	Jo Jo White (26)	37–13
51	February 5	@ Chicago	98–100	Jo Jo White (29)	37–14
52	February 6	@ Milwaukee	105–104	Dave Cowens (28)	38–14
53	February 8	New York	97–125	Jo Jo White (30)	39–14
54	February 10	N Milwaukee	95–86	Dave Cowens (20)	39–15
55	February 12	@ Golden State	107–102	John Havlicek (34)	40–15
56	February 13	@ Seattle	100–118	John Havlicek (20)	40–16
57	February 15	@ Portland	106–104	Jo Jo White (28)	41–16
58	February 17	@ Capital	95–99	Jo Jo White (23)	41–17
59	February 19	Detroit	97–107	John Havlicek (31)	42–17
60	February 22	@ Buffalo	116–109	John Havlicek (31)	43–17
61	February 24	N Atlanta	111–96	John Havlicek (32)	44–17
62	February 26	@ Detroit	86–83	John Havlicek (26)	45–17
63	February 27	N Buffalo	122–104	Dave Cowens (23)	45–18
64	March 1	@ Buffalo	94–110	Dave Cowens (18)	45–19
65	March 2	@ New York	104–88	Don Chaney (26)	46–19
66	March 3	New York	108–102 (OT)	Don Nelson (29)	46–20
67	March 6	@ Los Angeles	111–116	Paul Westphal (26)	46–21
68	March 7	@ Phoenix	99–97	Paul Silas (21)	47–21
69	March 8	@ Houston	106–113	Jo Jo White (30)	47–22
70	March 10	Los Angeles	82–94	Dave Cowens (24)	48–22
71	March 12	N Portland	93–110	John Havlicek (27)	49–22
72	March 13	Phoenix	97–104	John Havlicek (22)	50–22
73	March 15	@ Cleveland	103–104	John Havlicek (28)	50–23
74	March 16	@ Philadelphia	146–127	John Havlicek (28)	51–23
75	March 17	Capital	103–129	John Havlicek (29)	52–23
76	March 19	@ Houston	110–107	John Havlicek (23)	53–23
77	March 20	@ Atlanta	89–99	John Havlicek (34)	53–24
78	March 22	Portland	118–126	John Havlicek (22)	54–24
79	March 23	N Houston	105–108	John Havlicek (25)	55–24
80	March 24	Houston	106–109 (OT)	Jo Jo White (35)	56–24
81	March 26	@ Capital	108–126	Paul Westphal (28)	56–25
82	March 27	@ Philadelphia	108–117	Cowens, White (22)	56–26

== Playoffs ==
1974 playoff game log
Conference Semifinals: 4–2 (home: 3–0; road: 1–2)

Game	Date	Team	Score	High points	High rebounds	High assists	Location Attendance	Series
1	March 30	Buffalo	W 107–97	Jo Jo White (24)	Dave Cowens (18)	John Havlicek (12)	Boston Garden; 14,300	1–0
2	April 2	@ Buffalo	L 105–115	Jo Jo White (27)	Dave Cowens (16)	John Havlicek (7)	Buffalo Memorial Auditorium; 17,507	1–1
3	April 3	Buffalo	W 120–107	John Havlicek (43)	Dave Cowens (19)	John Havlicek (8)	Boston Garden; 14,656	2–1
4	April 6	@ Buffalo	L 102–104	Don Nelson (24)	Dave Cowens (14)	John Havlicek (8)	Buffalo Memorial Auditorium; 18,119	2–2
5	April 9	Buffalo	W 100–97	John Havlicek (25)	Dave Cowens (12)	Art Williams (8)	Boston Garden; 15,320	3–2
6	April 12	@ Buffalo	W 106–104	John Havlicek (30)	Dave Cowens (17)	John Havlicek (7)	Buffalo Memorial Auditorium; 18,257	4–2

Conference Finals: 4–1 (home: 2–1; road: 2–0)

Game	Date	Team	Score	High points	High rebounds	High assists	Location Attendance	Series
1	April 14	New York	W 113–88	John Havlicek (25)	Dave Cowens (13)	John Havlicek (12)	Boston Garden; 14,101	1–0
2	April 16	@ New York	W 111–99	John Havlicek (27)	Dave Cowens (18)	Jo Jo White (6)	Madison Square Garden; 19,694	2–0
3	April 19	New York	L 100–103	Dave Cowens (28)	Dave Cowens (22)	Art Williams (5)	Boston Garden; 15,320	2–1
4	April 21	@ New York	W 98–91	John Havlicek (36)	Paul Silas (14)	Jo Jo White (9)	Madison Square Garden; 19,694	3–1
5	April 24	New York	W 105–94	John Havlicek (33)	Dave Cowens (14)	John Havlicek (5)	Boston Garden; 15,320	4–1

NBA Finals: 4–3 (home: 1–2; road: 3–1)

Game	Date	Team	Score	High points	High rebounds	High assists	Location Attendance	Series
1	April 28	@ Milwaukee	W 98–83	John Havlicek (26)	Dave Cowens (17)	Cowens, White (7)	Milwaukee Arena; 10,938	1–0
2	April 30	@ Milwaukee	L 96–105 (OT)	Jo Jo White (25)	Dave Cowens (11)	Dave Cowens (6)	Milwaukee Arena; 10,938	1–1
3	May 3	Milwaukee	W 95–83	Dave Cowens (30)	John Havlicek (12)	Jo Jo White (8)	Boston Garden; 15,320	2–1
4	May 5	Milwaukee	L 89–97	John Havlicek (33)	Paul Silas (12)	Jo Jo White (9)	Boston Garden; 15,320	2–2
5	May 7	@ Milwaukee	W 96–87	Havlicek, Cowens (28)	Paul Silas (16)	Dave Cowens (6)	Milwaukee Arena; 10,938	3–2
6	May 10	Milwaukee	L 101–102 (2OT)	John Havlicek (36)	Havlicek, Silas (9)	Jo Jo White (11)	Boston Garden; 15,320	3–3
7	May 12	@ Milwaukee	W 102–87	Dave Cowens (28)	Dave Cowens (14)	Havlicek, Westphal (6)	Milwaukee Arena; 10,938	4–3

1974 schedule
