= 1973–74 Buffalo Braves season =

1973–74 basketball season for Buffalo Braves

- Head coach: Jack Ramsay
- Owner: Paul Snyder
- Arena: Buffalo Memorial Auditorium; Maple Leaf Gardens

Results
- Record: 42–40 (.512)
- Place: Division: 3rd (Atlantic); Conference: 4th (Eastern)
- Playoff finish: Conference Semifinals (lost to Celtics 2–4)
- Stats at Basketball Reference

Local media
- Television: WBEN-TV
- Radio: WBEN (Van Miller, Rudy Martzke)

The 1973–74 Buffalo Braves season was the fourth season for the expansion Buffalo Braves franchise in the National Basketball Association and its Atlantic Division. It was the team's second season under head coach Jack Ramsay. The team's official home arena was Buffalo Memorial Auditorium. It was the first season where the team wore Columbia blue for their uniforms, which they retained for the rest of their tenure in Buffalo.

Bob McAdoo, who finished second in the NBA MVP Award voting, led the league in scoring; Ernie DiGregorio, who won the NBA Rookie of the Year Award, led the league in assists and free throw percentage, and every starter on the team was among the league's top ten in at least one statistical category.

The team finished third in the Atlantic Division and fourth in the Eastern Conference. After three consecutive 60-loss seasons, the team made the NBA playoffs for the first time and became the youngest team to have ever done so in terms of average player age. They lost in the first round of the playoffs to the eventual champions, the Boston Celtics.

== Draft picks ==
Round	Pick	Player	Position	Nationality	College
1	3	Ernie DiGregorio	Guard	United States	Providence College
3	38	Ken Charles	Guard	Trinidad & Tobago	Fordham University
4	54	Doug Little	Forward	United States	Oregon
5	72	Randy Noll	Forward	United States	Marshall
6	88	Mike Macaluso	Forward	United States	Canisius College
7	106	Tim Bassett	Forward	United States	Georgia
8	122	Carl Jackson	Guard	United States	St. Bonaventure
9	140	Bob Fullerton	Center	United States	Xavier
10	153	Nick Connor	Forward	United States	Illinois
11	168	Mike Lee	Guard	United States	Syracuse
12	176	Aaron Covington	Guard	United States	Canisius College
13	184	Bob Vartanian	Guard	United States	Buffalo
14	190	Ron Gilliam	Guard	United States	SUNY Brockport
15	195	John Fraley	Forward	United States	Georgia
16	200	John Green	Forward	United States	Oregon
17	204	Jim Garvin	Forward	United States	Boston University
18	207	Don Johnston	Forward	United States	North Carolina
19	209	Ron Thornson	Forward	United States	British Columbia
20	211	Phil Tollestrup	Forward	United States	Brigham Young

== Roster ==
1973–74 Buffalo Braves roster
Players

Pos.	No.	Player	Height	Weight	DOB	From
G	14	Ken Charles	6 ft 3 in (1.91 m)	180 lb (82 kg)		Fordham
G	15	Ernie DiGregorio	6 ft 0 in (1.83 m)	180 lb (82 kg)		Providence
F	30	Jim Garvin	6 ft 7 in (2.01 m)	200 lb (91 kg)		Boston University
G	4	Matt Guokas	6 ft 6 in (1.98 m)	195 lb (88 kg)		Saint Joseph's
F	24	Gar Heard	6 ft 6 in (1.98 m)	220 lb (100 kg)		Oklahoma
F	44	Bob Kauffman	6 ft 8 in (2.03 m)	240 lb (109 kg)		Guilford
C	43	Kevin Kunnert	6 ft 9 in (2.06 m)	230 lb (104 kg)		Iowa
F	21	Mike Macaluso	6 ft 5 in (1.96 m)	210 lb (95 kg)		Canisius
F	42	Jack Marin	6 ft 6 in (1.98 m)	210 lb (95 kg)		Duke
C	11	Bob McAdoo	6 ft 9 in (2.06 m)	210 lb (95 kg)		North Carolina
F	5	Jim McMillian	6 ft 5 in (1.96 m)	220 lb (100 kg)		Columbia
C	22	Paul Ruffner	6 ft 11 in (2.11 m)	225 lb (102 kg)		BYU
G	9	Randy Smith	6 ft 3 in (1.91 m)	185 lb (84 kg)		Buffalo State
G	3	Lee Winfield	6 ft 2 in (1.88 m)	174 lb (79 kg)		North Texas
G	13	Dave Wohl	6 ft 2 in (1.88 m)	185 lb (84 kg)		Penn

Coaches
Head coach
- Jack Ramsay

Legend
- (DP) Unsigned draft pick
- (FA) Free agent
- (S) Suspended
- Injured

=== Roster notes ===
- Forward Jim Garvin played in only 6 games before being waived in November.
- Both center Kevin Kunnert and guard Dave Wohl were later traded away to the Houston Rockets in February.

== Regular season ==
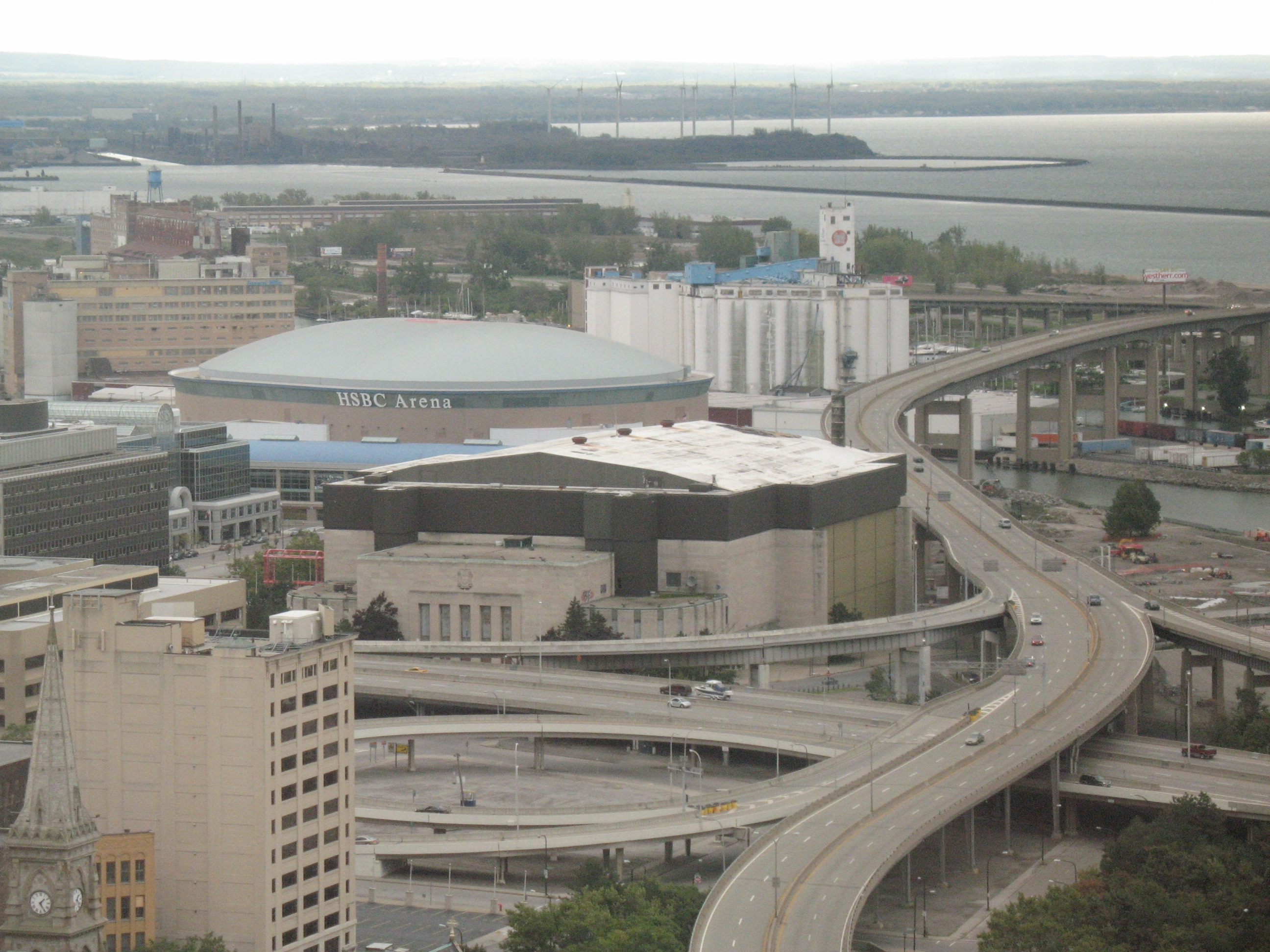
The Braves played most of their home games in the Buffalo Memorial Auditorium (dark rimmed building in front of the HSBC Arena, pictured in 2007).

McAdoo had an outstanding second season and led the league in scoring with 30.6 ppg. The Braves led the league in team scoring (111.60) but were last in team defense (111.8). They totaled 427,270 in attendance in their 41 home games, ranking them 4th of 17 teams. The Braves played several home games at the Maple Leaf Gardens in Toronto, in order to expand their fan base into Canada. This season was the first of three consecutive scoring titles for McAdoo. McAdoo also posted 15.1 rebounds per game and 3.3 blocked shots per game, which were each third in the league. It was the most recent time that one player averaged both 30 points and 15 rebounds in the same NBA season. In addition to McAdoo, the Braves were led by Ernie DiGregorio, who became the second straight Brave (following McAdoo) to capture NBA Rookie of the Year honors by leading the league in assists with 8.2 per game. 1974 NBA Rookie of the Year DiGregorio earned the first of two NBA free throw percentage championships (90.2%) and led the NBA in assists (8.2). That season DiGregorio set the NBA single-game rookie assists record (25), which still stands as unbroken (tied by Nate McMillan). Jim McMillan would finish fifth in the NBA in minutes played (3322) and tenth in free throw percentage (85.8%). He also finished second on the Braves in scoring (18.6). Heard went on to rank in the top ten in rebounds (11.7, 10th) and blocked shots (2.8, 6th) that season. Randy Smith, who was third on the team in scoring with a 15.5 average, finished third in the league in steals (2.5/game).

October–November

In his October 9, 1973 NBA debut against the Houston Rockets, Ernie DiGregorio had 14 assists. DiGregrorio had 17 points but it was a 25-foot basket with two seconds left in overtime by McAdoo, who had 31 points and 21 rebounds, that earned the Braves a 107–105 victory. An October 30 victory over the Seattle SuperSonics gave the Braves a half game lead over the Celtics in the Atlantic Division with a 6–4 record. The Braves only won one of their next nine games. It came on November 14 when McAdoo set the franchise single game rebound record with 28 against the Atlanta Hawks. That night, he also scored 31 points for the fourth game in a row. Two weeks later on November 28, the Braves lost when Pete Maravich, who entered the game in the second quarter and posted 42 points off the bench, led the Atlanta Hawks over the Braves by 130–106.

December–January

The Braves' December 12 game against the Celtics was played in Providence, Rhode Island, making it a homecoming game for DiGregorio, the former Providence Friar. The Braves lost for the 20th consecutive time to the Celtics that night. Following a December 30 loss to the Los Angeles Lakers, the Braves fell to a 16–22 record at the end of 1973 but began the New Year with a season high seven-game winning streak. Heard set a career high with 22 rebounds in game five of the streak on January 8. The fifth game of the streak set a new franchise record for consecutive wins and gave the team 21 wins, which matched their total of the prior season. The resulting 23–22 record following the January 12 victory over the Capital Bullets gave them their first winning record since their 6–5 start. McAdoo, who would go on to finish second in the NBA Most Valuable Player Award balloting, represented the team in the January 15, 1974 NBA All-Star Game. By the end of the month the Braves had fallen back to a 26–29 record.

February–March

On February 1, the Braves traded Kunnert and Wohl to the Rockets for Goukas and Marin. The team then went 10–5 in February. On February 27, the Braves earned their first victory over the Boston Celtics after 22 defeats. By late February, the team had the top scoring offense in the league. They clinched their first playoff experience in a victory at a home game held at Toronto's Maple Leaf Gardens against the Portland Trail Blazers as McAdoo again had 28 rebounds as well as 29 points. The clinching game on March 10 was the Braves 74th game. The team reached five games over .500 three times following their 40th, 41st and 42nd wins but lost the last three games of a five-game western road trip to conclude the season at 42–40. The team made the playoffs by finishing in 3rd place in the Atlantic Division.

=== Season standings ===
Atlantic Division	W	L	PCT	GB	Home	Road	Neutral	Div
y-Boston Celtics	56	26	.683	–	26–6	21–18	9–2	17–5
x-New York Knicks	49	33	.598	7	28–13	21–19	0–1	10–12
x-Buffalo Braves	42	40	.512	14	19–13	17–21	6–6	12–10
Philadelphia 76ers	25	57	.305	31	14–23	9–30	2–4	5–17

#	Eastern Conference				
#	Team	W	L	PCT	GB
1	z-Boston Celtics	56	26	.683	–
2	x-New York Knicks	49	33	.598	7
3	y-Capital Bullets	47	35	.573	9
4	x-Buffalo Braves	42	40	.512	14
5	Atlanta Hawks	35	47	.427	21
6	Houston Rockets	32	50	.390	24
7	Cleveland Cavaliers	29	53	.354	27
8	Philadelphia 76ers	25	57	.305	31

=== Season schedule ===
1973–74 game log
Total: 42–40 (home: 25–19; road: 17–21)
October: 6–4 (home: 4–1; road: 2–3)

Game	Date	Team	Score	High points	High rebounds	High assists	Location Attendance	Record
1	October 9	Houston	105–107 (OT)	McAdoo (31)	McAdoo (21)	DiGregorio (14)	Buffalo Memorial Auditorium; 11,462	1–0
2	October 12	@ Boston	112–118	McAdoo (25)	Heard (10)	DiGregorio (8)	Boston Garden; 15,320	1–1
3	October 13	Los Angeles	122–125	McAdoo (35)	McAdoo (21)	DiGregorio (8)	Buffalo Memorial Auditorium; 12,565	1–2
4	October 16	@ New York	91–117	McMillian (29)	Heard, McAdoo (13)	DiGregorio (4)	Madison Square Garden; 17,210	1–3
5	October 20	Philadelphia	110–116	DiGregorio, McAdoo (24)	McAdoo (18)	DiGregorio (9)	Buffalo Memorial Auditorium; 6,232	2–3
6	October 24	@ Milwaukee	113–130	McAdoo (32)	Heard (10)	DiGregorio (10)	Milwaukee Arena; 8,309	2–4
7	October 26	N Cleveland	97–104	McMillian (36)	McAdoo (15)	DiGregorio (7)	Maple Leaf Gardens; 7,187	3–4
8	October 27	@ Cleveland	111–101	Heard (23)	Heard (18)	DiGregorio (8)	Cleveland Arena; 4,313	4–4
9	October 28	@ Kansas City-Omaha	112–100	McAdoo (44)	McAdoo (12)	Wohl (5)	Municipal Auditorium; 5,045	5–4
10	October 30	Seattle	103–105	DiGregorio, McAdoo, Smith (21)	Heard, McAdoo (15)	DiGregorio (5)	Buffalo Memorial Auditorium; 7,396	6–4

November: 4–11 (home: 3–5; road: 1–6)

Game	Date	Team	Score	High points	High rebounds	High assists	Location Attendance	Record
11	November 2	@ Chicago	97–107	McAdoo (30)	McAdoo (15)	DiGregorio (8)	Chicago Stadium; 7,718	6–5
12	November 3	Golden State	124–121 (OT)	McMillian (48)	McAdoo (14)	DiGregorio (10)	Buffalo Memorial Auditorium; 8,644	6–6
13	November 4	N Chicago	101–95 (OT)	McAdoo (28)	McAdoo (18)	DiGregorio (9)	Maple Leaf Gardens; 6,075	6–7
14	November 7	@ Seattle	113–130	McAdoo (31)	McMillian (9)	DiGregorio (7)	Seattle Center Coliseum; 8,878	6–8
15	November 9	@ Portland	108–122	McAdoo (31)	McMillian (10)	Wohl (10)	Memorial Coliseum; 11,789	6–9
16	November 10	@ Golden State	105–128	McAdoo (31)	McAdoo (16)	DiGregorio, McMillian (6)	Oakland-Alameda County Coliseum Arena; 5,431	6–10
17	November 13	Atlanta	114–121	McAdoo (31)	McAdoo (28)	DiGregorio (13)	Buffalo Memorial Auditorium; 6,885	7–10
18	November 15	@ New York	86–97	McAdoo (23)	McAdoo (19)	DiGregorio (10)	Madison Square Garden; 17,462	7–11
19	November 17	Detroit	98–94	McAdoo (23)	McAdoo (18)	DiGregorio (6)	Buffalo Memorial Auditorium; 8,104	7–12
20	November 18	@ Capital	112–101	McAdoo (43)	McAdoo (17)	Wohl (8)	Cole Field House; 6,134	8–12
21	November 20	Phoenix	100–127	McAdoo (26)	McAdoo (18)	DiGregorio (8)	Buffalo Memorial Auditorium; 6,088	9–12
22	November 24	Kansas City-Omaha	131–143	McAdoo (43)	McAdoo (17)	DiGregorio, Smith (8)	Buffalo Memorial Auditorium; 16,063	10–12
23	November 27	Milwaukee	115–110	McMillian (24)	McAdoo (11)	Smith (8)	Buffalo Memorial Auditorium; 8,169	10–13
24	November 28	@ Atlanta	106–130	McMillian (33)	McMillian (12)	DiGregorio (8)	Omni Coliseum; 9,531	10–14
25	November 30	Capital	121–113	McMillian (30)	Kauffman, McAdoo (14)	DiGregorio (14)	Buffalo Memorial Auditorium; 6,118	10–15

December: 6–7 (home: 3–5; road: 3–2)

Game	Date	Team	Score	High points	High rebounds	High assists	Location Attendance	Record
26	December 5	Portland	110–114	McAdoo (37)	McAdoo (14)	DiGregorio (10)	Buffalo Memorial Auditorium; 4,355	11–15
27	December 7	New York	113–108	Smith (27)	McAdoo (19)	McMillian (7)	Buffalo Memorial Auditorium; 13,172	11–16
28	December 9	N Boston	114–118	McAdoo (49)	McAdoo (17)	DiGregorio (11)	Maple Leaf Gardens; 10,173	11–17
29	December 11	@ Atlanta	132–127 (OT)	McAdoo (37)	McAdoo (13)	Smith (10)	Omni Coliseum; 9,115	12–17
30	December 12	N Boston	119–126	McAdoo (42)	McAdoo (11)	DiGregorio (9)	Providence Civic Center; 11,671	12–18
31	December 14	@ Cleveland	102–98	McAdoo (27)	McAdoo (19)	DiGregorio (8)	Cleveland Arena; 2,593	13–18
32	December 18	Cleveland	93–100	Heard, McAdoo (22)	McAdoo (15)	McAdoo, Smith (6)	Buffalo Memorial Auditorium; 10,224	14–18
33	December 21	New York	115–117	McAdoo (29)	McAdoo (25)	McAdoo (6)	Buffalo Memorial Auditorium; 10,073	15–18
34	December 22	@ Kansas City-Omaha	112–122	McAdoo (28)	Heard (13)	DiGregorio (4)	Municipal Auditorium; 7,546	15–19
35	December 23	N Capital	110–85	McMillian (22)	Heard (21)	DiGregorio (6)	Maple Leaf Gardens; 7,112	15–20
36	December 26	Boston	125–123	Heard (36)	Heard (17)	DiGregorio (10)	Buffalo Memorial Auditorium; 12,653	15–21
37	December 29	@ Phoenix	120–108	McAdoo (30)	McAdoo (15)	Smith (9)	Arizona Veterans Memorial Coliseum; 9,116	16–21
38	December 30	@ Los Angeles	105–108	McAdoo (35)	McAdoo (19)	DiGregorio, Heard (5)	The Forum; 16,787	16–22

January: 10–7 (home: 5–4; road: 5–3)

Game	Date	Team	Score	High points	High rebounds	High assists	Location Attendance	Record
39	January 1	@ Portland	120–119	Heard (31)	Heard (13)	DiGregorio (25)	Memorial Coliseum; 6,595	17–22
40	January 2	@ Seattle	115–111	McAdoo (31)	McAdoo (12)	DiGregorio (12)	Seattle Center Coliseum; 12,011	18–22
41	January 5	@ New York	111–110	McAdoo (32)	McAdoo (13)	DiGregorio, Smith (5)	Madison Square Garden; 19,694	19–22
42	January 6	N Atlanta	117–109	McAdoo (34)	Heard (20)	Smith (10)	Maple Leaf Gardens; 7,484	20–22
43	January 8	Atlanta	96–100	McAdoo (32)	Heard (22)	DiGregorio (8)	Buffalo Memorial Auditorium; 10,472	21–22
44	January 11	Houston	99–117	McAdoo (30)	Heard, McAdoo (12)	Smith (5)	Buffalo Memorial Auditorium; 10,291	22–22
45	January 12	@ Capital	97–96	McMillian (37)	Heard (18)	DiGregorio (7)	Capital Centre; 12,206	23–22
46	January 13	N Houston	121–112	McMillian (26)	McAdoo (17)	Smith (9)	Maple Leaf Gardens; 4,639	23–23
47	January 18	Capital	94–98	McAdoo (25)	McAdoo (16)	DiGregorio (14)	Buffalo Memorial Auditorium; 11,227	24–23
48	January 20	@ Philadelphia	112–129	McAdoo (38)	Heard (12)	Wohl (4)	The Spectrum; 3,925	24–24
49	January 22	Philadelphia	109–119	McMillian (32)	Heard (15)	DiGregorio (14)	Buffalo Memorial Auditorium; 6,264	25–24
50	January 23	N Milwaukee	114–88	McMillian (17)	Heard, Kunnert (6)	DiGregorio (6)	Dane County Veteran Memorial Coliseum; 7,325	25–25
51	January 25	Kansas City-Omaha	118–113	McAdoo (33)	McAdoo (17)	Smith (7)	Buffalo Memorial Auditorium; 10,297	25–26
52	January 26	@ Atlanta	122–132	Smith (32)	McAdoo (13)	DiGregorio (6)	Omni Coliseum; 8,533	25–27
53	January 27	@ Houston	122–108	McAdoo (34)	McAdoo (13)	Wohl (7)	Hofheinz Pavilion; 3,341	26–27
54	January 29	Golden State	128–121	Smith (30)	McAdoo (15)	DiGregorio (12)	Buffalo Memorial Auditorium; 6,341	26–28
55	January 30	@ Detroit	96–111	McAdoo (30)	Heard (15)	McMillian, Smith (6)	Cobo Arena; 4,732	26–29

February: 9–5 (home: 6–3; road: 3–2)

Game	Date	Team	Score	High points	High rebounds	High assists	Location Attendance	Record
56	February 3	N Philadelphia	98–112	McAdoo (28)	Heard (17)	DiGregorio (12)	Maple Leaf Gardens; 6,341	27–29
57	February 6	@ Philadelphia	114–98	McAdoo (40)	McAdoo (21)	Guokas, McMillian, Smith (6)	The Spectrum; 2,058	28–29
58	February 8	Chicago	101–106	McAdoo (29)	McAdoo (23)	DiGregorio (14)	Buffalo Memorial Auditorium; 13,667	29–29
59	February 9	@ New York	103–100 (OT)	McAdoo (32)	McAdoo (20)	DiGregorio (8)	Madison Square Garden; 19,694	30–29
60	February 10	@ Cleveland	121–125	McAdoo (33)	McAdoo (13)	McMillian (8)	Cleveland Arena; 2,997	30–30
61	February 12	New York	100–93	McAdoo (23)	McAdoo (21)	DiGregorio (13)	Buffalo Memorial Auditorium; 13,491	30–31
62	February 13	@ Philadelphia	129–106	McAdoo (30)	McAdoo (14)	DiGregorio (6)	The Spectrum; 3,926	31–31
63	February 15	Detroit	116–118	McAdoo (34)	Heard (16)	DiGregorio (11)	Buffalo Memorial Auditorium; 15,164	32–31
64	February 16	@ Capital	92–101	McAdoo (29)	McAdoo (13)	DiGregorio (8)	Capital Centre; 12,651	32–32
65	February 17	@ Houston	135–118	McAdoo (38)	McAdoo (9)	DiGregorio (10)	Hofheinz Pavilion; 4,847	33–32
66	February 19	Milwaukee	109–145	McAdoo (36)	Heard (12)	Heard (9)	Buffalo Memorial Auditorium; 15,676	34–32
67	February 21	N New York	97–119	McAdoo (29)	Heard (11)	DiGregorio (11)	Maple Leaf Gardens; 1,641	35–32
68	February 22	Boston	116–109	McAdoo (52)	McAdoo (22)	DiGregorio (8)	Buffalo Memorial Auditorium; 18,023	35–33
69	February 26	Los Angeles	119–112	McAdoo (44)	McAdoo (24)	DiGregorio (7)	Buffalo Memorial Auditorium; 13,788	35–34
70	February 27	N Boston	122–104	McAdoo (37)	McAdoo (15)	DiGregorio (11)	Providence Civic Center; 10,917	36–34

March: 6–6 (home: 4–1; road: 2–5)

Game	Date	Team	Score	High points	High rebounds	High assists	Location Attendance	Record
71	March 1	Boston	94–110	McAdoo (31)	McAdoo (18)	DiGregorio (10)	Buffalo Memorial Auditorium; 17,378	37–34
72	March 2	@ Philadelphia	103–99	McAdoo (33)	McAdoo (18)	DiGregorio (5)	The Spectrum; 5,833	38–34
73	March 8	Seattle	123–117 (OT)	McAdoo (37)	McAdoo (21)	Smith (8)	Buffalo Memorial Auditorium; 16,218	38–35
74	March 10	N Portland	112–122	McAdoo (29)	McAdoo (28)	DiGregorio, Smith (7)	Maple Leaf Gardens; 6,291	39–35
75	March 12	Phoenix	94–124	McMillian (30)	Heard (25)	DiGregorio (8)	Buffalo Memorial Auditorium; 14,244	40–35
76	March 15	@ Chicago	97–114	Heard (18)	Heard (12)	Kauffman (6)	Chicago Stadium; 12,762	40–36
77	March 16	Cleveland	105–114	Smith (30)	Heard (24)	DiGregorio (8)	Buffalo Memorial Auditorium; 18,000	41–36
78	March 17	@ Detroit	109–116	Smith (32)	Heard (10)	DiGregorio (10)	Cobo Arena; 10,719	41–37
79	March 21	@ Golden State	115–102	Smith (23)	Heard (17)	DiGregorio (11)	Oakland-Alameda County Coliseum Arena; 9,175	42–37
80	March 22	@ Phoenix	119–126	Heard (31)	Heard (14)	Kauffman, Winfield (6)	Arizona Veterans Memorial Coliseum; 8,604	42–38
81	March 24	@ Los Angeles	124–150	McAdoo (40)	McAdoo (15)	DiGregorio (11)	The Forum; 17,505	42–39
82	March 26	@ Houston	96–119	McAdoo (35)	Marin (11)	Smith (8)	Hofheinz Pavilion; 3,543	42–40

Source: www.basketball-reference.com

== Playoffs ==
In the 1974 NBA Playoffs the Braves were matched up against the Boston Celtics. The Celtics had won 22 of 24 matches between the teams. However, the Braves had won the most recent two matches after 22 straight defeats, including 5 earlier that season. Through four games, the series was even at two games apiece. However the Celtics would pull away with two more wins to take the series in six games. With rookie DiGregorio and 2nd year McAdoo leading the way, the team became the youngest NBA playoff team (24.42, using data going back to 1952) based on average age weighted by minutes played. The 1977–78 Milwaukee Bucks (23.82) would surpass this record. The Celtics went on to win the NBA championship in the 1974 NBA Finals.

In game 1, the Braves lost a 17-point lead as Dave Cowens led a fourth quarter rally despite five personal fouls. In game 2, the Braves evened the series 1–1 with a 115–105 victory despite balanced scoring by the Celtics who had three 20-point scorers: Jo Jo White had 27, Don Nelson had 21 and John Havlicek had 20. McAdoo had 23 and DiGregorio had 18 for Buffalo. The Braves led most of game 2 and held on for the victory. In game 3, the Celtics scored 39 first quarter points on their way to a 120–107 victory. Havlicek had 43 points (26 in the first half), and Cowens added 23 (17 in the first half). The Braves recovered from an early fourth quarter 10-point deficit to win game 4 104–102. The game had a frenetic final 15 seconds as McMillian lost the ball on a drive resulting in a game-tying fast break by the Celtics. Then when a McAdoo shot rolled off the rim, McMillian tipped the ball in as time expired for the victory. The Braves had rallied from an 84–74 deficit to tie the score at 98 largely on the performance of McAdoo. In the game the lead changed hands 9 times, and the Braves outrebounded the Celtics 62–38, including 20–3 offensive rebounds (11 by McMillian). The Celtics won game 5 by a 100–97 margin. Although McAdoo was held to 16 points on the night, the Braves led 89–85 with four minutes left. The Celtics won game 6 of the series when White sank two free throws after time expired in regulation play for a 106–104 victory. McAdoo had tied the score at 104 with 7 seconds left, but he fouled White at midcourt.

In the playoffs, Heard bettered his regular season 15.3 points and 11.7 rebounds averages with 16.8 points and 14.7 rebounds. Likewise, McAdoo contributed 31.7 points and 13.7 rebounds. McMillian contributed 14.5 points and 8.8 rebounds. Following the season the team lost Bob Kauffman to the New Orleans Jazz in the May 20, 1974 NBA expansion draft.

=== Playoff Schedule ===
1974 playoff game log
Conference Semifinals: 2–4 (home: 2–1; road: 0–3)

Game	Date	Team	Score	High points	High rebounds	High assists	Location Attendance	Series
1	March 30	@ Boston	L 97–107	Bob McAdoo (29)	Gar Heard (20)	Ernie DiGregorio (8)	Boston Garden; 14,300	0–1
2	April 2	Boston	W 115–105	Bob McAdoo (23)	Bob McAdoo (20)	Ernie DiGregorio (12)	Buffalo Memorial Auditorium; 17,507	1–1
3	April 3	@ Boston	L 107–120	Bob McAdoo (38)	Gar Heard (13)	Ernie DiGregorio (8)	Boston Garden; 14,656	1–2
4	April 6	Boston	W 104–102	Bob McAdoo (44)	Jim McMillian (18)	Ernie DiGregorio (11)	Buffalo Memorial Auditorium; 18,119	2–2
5	April 9	@ Boston	L 97–100	Randy Smith (25)	Gar Heard (16)	Ernie DiGregorio (4)	Boston Garden; 15,320	2–3
6	April 12	Boston	L 104–106	Bob McAdoo (40)	McAdoo, Heard (15)	Ernie DiGregorio (9)	Buffalo Memorial Auditorium; 18,257	2–4

1974 schedule

Source: www.basketball-reference.com

== Player stats ==
Legend
GP	Games played	MPG	Minutes per game	FG	Field-goals per game	FGA	Field-goals attempted per Game
FG%	Field-goal percentage	FT	Free-throws per game	FTA	Free-throws attempted per Game	FT%	Free-throw percentage
ORPG	Offensive rebounds per game	DRPG	Defensive rebounds per game	RPG	Rebounds per game	APG	Assists per game
SPG	Steals per game	BPG	Blocks per game	PFPG	Personal fouls per game	PPG	Points per game

Player	GP	MPG	FG	FGA	FG%	FT	FTA	FT%	ORPG	DRPG	RPG	APG	SPG	BPG	PFPG	PPG
Bob McAdoo	74	43	12.2	22.3	0.547	6.2	7.8	0.793	3.8	11.3	15.1	2.3	1.2	3.3	3.4	30.6
Jim McMillian	82	40.5	7.3	14.8	0.494	4	4.6	0.858	2.6	4.8	7.4	3.1	1.6	0.3	2.3	18.6
Randy Smith	82	33.5	6.5	13.2	0.492	2.5	3.5	0.712	1.1	2.8	3.8	4.7	2.5	0	3.2	15.5
Gar Heard	81	35.7	6.5	14.9	0.435	2.4	3.6	0.65	3.3	8.4	11.7	2.2	1.7	2.8	3.7	15.3
Ernie DiGregorio	81	35.9	6.5	15.6	0.421	2.1	2.4	0.902	0.6	2.1	2.7	8.2	0.7	0.1	3	15.2
Jack Marin	27	25.2	5.4	9.9	0.545	2.6	3	0.877	1.1	3.4	4.5	1.7	0.9	0.7	3.4	13.4
Bob Kauffman	74	17.6	2.3	4.9	0.467	1.4	2	0.713	1.3	3.1	4.4	1.9	0.5	0.2	2.1	6.1
Matt Guokas	27	20.3	2.3	4.1	0.555	0.4	0.7	0.5	0.4	1	1.5	2.6	0.7	0.2	2.1	4.9
Dave Wohl	41	14.8	1.5	3.7	0.4	1	1.5	0.7	0.2	0.5	0.7	3.1	0.8	0	1.8	4
Ken Charles	59	11.7	1.5	3.1	0.476	0.9	1.3	0.671	0.4	0.7	1.1	0.9	0.5	0.2	1.5	3.9
Lee Winfield	36	12	1	2.9	0.352	0.9	1.4	0.635	0.5	0.7	1.2	1.3	0.4	0.1	1.2	3
Kevin Kunnert	39	8.7	1.3	2.6	0.485	0.3	0.4	0.688	1.1	1.6	2.7	0.6	0.1	0.6	2.1	2.8
Mike Macaluso	30	3.7	0.6	1.5	0.432	0.3	0.6	0.588	0.3	0.5	0.8	0.1	0.2	0	1	1.6
Paul Ruffner	20	2.6	0.6	1.4	0.407	0.4	0.7	0.615	0.2	0.4	0.6	0	0.1	0.1	0.5	1.5
Jim Garvin	6	1.8	0.2	0.7	0.25	0	0		0.2	0.7	0.8	0	0	0	0.2	0.3

== Awards and honors ==
- Ernie DiGregorio, NBA Rookie of the Year
- Ernie DiGregorio, led NBA in assists (663)
- Ernie DiGregorio, led NBA in free throw percentage
- Bob McAdoo led the NBA in scoring.
- Bob McAdoo All-NBA Team (2nd team)
- Bob McAdoo 1974 NBA All-Star Game

== Transactions ==
Prior to this season the Braves had lost 60 games or more each year and failed to make the NBA playoffs. Over the course of the season, the team made a series of player transactions that were part of the résumé that earned Buffalo Braves General Manager Eddie Donovan the NBA Executive of the Year Award and put the team into the playoffs for the first time. Donovan's season bolstered his reputation as a wheeler and dealer.

The Braves drafted four players in the 1973 NBA draft who played for the team during the 1973–74 season: DiGregorio, Ken Charles, Mike Macaluso, and Jim Garvin. In addition, the team made two free agent signings. On September 11, 1973, the team signed Paul Ruffner. On September 17, 1973, the team waived Dick Garrett and Bill Hewitt. The other members of the 1972–73 team who were not traded or waived and did not play on the 1973–74 team were Howard Komives, Fred Hilton and Harold Fox. On November 24, 1973, the Braves waived Garvin. On November 27, 1973, the team signed Lee Winfield.

Prior to the 1973–74 NBA season, Gar Heard and Kevin Kunnert were traded from the Chicago Bulls to the Buffalo Braves for John Hummer, a 1974 NBA draft 2nd round pick and a 1975 NBA draft 2nd round pick. Also before the season, the Braves also traded Elmore Smith to the Los Angeles Lakers for Jim McMillian. The trade of Smith, who had been the team's leading scorer and rebounder the prior year, was controversial at first. Other trades during the season included the February 1, 1974, trade of Kunnert and Dave Wohl for Matt Guokas and 1973 NBA All-Star Jack Marin.

The Braves were involved in the following transactions during the 1973–74 season.

=== Trades ===
September 10, 1973
To Buffalo Braves

- Gar Heard
- Kevin Kunnert
To Chicago Bulls

- John Hummer
- 1974 2nd round draft pick
- 1975 2nd round draft pick
September 12, 1973
To Buffalo Braves

- Jim McMillian
To Los Angeles Lakers

- Elmore Smith
February 1, 1974
To Buffalo Braves

- Matt Guokas
- Jack Marin
To Houston Rockets

- Kevin Kunnert
- Dave Wohl

=== Free agents ===
==== Additions ====
Player	Signed	Former team
Paul Ruffner	September 11	Pittsburgh Condors
Lee Winfield	November 27	Seattle SuperSonics

==== Subtractions ====
Player	Left	New team
Fred Hilton	free agency, July 1	Scranton Apollos
Dick Garrett	waived, September 17	New York Knicks
Bill Hewitt	waived, September 17	Chicago Bulls
Howard Komives	waived, October 7	Kansas City-Omaha Kings
Jim Garvin	waived, November 24	Retired
