= Mike Macaluso =

American basketball player (1951–2022)

Personal information
- Born: July 21, 1951 Buffalo, New York, U.S.
- Died: November 16, 2022 (aged 71)
- Listed height: 6 ft 5 in (1.96 m)
- Listed weight: 210 lb (95 kg)

Career information
- High school: Hutchinson Central Tech (Buffalo, New York)
- College: Canisius (1970–1973)
- NBA draft: 1973: 6th round, 88th overall pick
- Drafted by: Buffalo Braves
- Position: Shooting guard
- Number: 21

Career history
- 1973–1974: Buffalo Braves
- 1974–1975: Israel Sabras

Career highlights
- EPBL champion (1975)
- Stats at NBA.com
- Stats at Basketball Reference

Michael Emilius Macaluso (July 21, 1951 – November 16, 2022) was an American professional basketball player. He played 30 games for the Buffalo Braves of the National Basketball Association (NBA) in the 1973–74 season.

Macaluso played college basketball for the Canisius Golden Griffins from 1970 to 1973. He led his team in scoring in three consecutive seasons and averaged 8.7 rebounds per game, which ranks in the top-10 all-time in school history. He was inducted into the Canisius College Hall of Fame in 1989.

He was drafted by Buffalo Braves in the sixth round (88th overall) of the 1973 NBA draft. He was also drafted by the ABA's Kentucky Colonels that same year. Macaluso signed with Buffalo.

After his NBA stint, he played for the Israel Sabras in the European Professional Basketball League in 1974-75 where he helped win a championship. The league folded after that one season.

After retiring from basketball, Macaluso had a successful entrepreneurial career across various industries including multiple public life sciences enterprises. He co-founded both Ampio Pharmaceuticals, Inc. and Aytu BioPharma in 2015.

Macaluso died on November 16, 2022, at the age of 71.

== Career statistics ==
Legend
GP	Games played	GS	Games started	MPG	Minutes per game
FG%	Field goal percentage	3P%	3-point field goal percentage	FT%	Free throw percentage
RPG	Rebounds per game	APG	Assists per game	SPG	Steals per game
BPG	Blocks per game	PPG	Points per game	**Bold**	Career high

=== NBA ===
==== Regular season ====
Year	Team	GP	MPG	FG%	FT%	RPG	APG	SPG	BPG	PPG
1973–74	Buffalo	30	3.7	.432	.588	.8	.1	.2	.0	1.6
