= 1973–74 NBA season =

28th NBA season

- League: National Basketball Association
- Sport: Basketball
- Duration: October 9, 1973 – March 27, 1974; March 29 – April 24, 1974 (Playoffs); April 28 – May 12, 1974 (Finals)
- Games: 82
- Teams: 17
- TV partner: CBS

Draft
- Top draft pick: Doug Collins
- Picked by: Philadelphia 76ers

Regular season
- Top seed: Milwaukee Bucks
- Season MVP: Kareem Abdul-Jabbar (Milwaukee)
- Top scorer: Bob McAdoo (Buffalo)

Playoffs
- Eastern champions: Boston Celtics
- Eastern runners-up: New York Knicks
- Western champions: Milwaukee Bucks
- Western runners-up: Chicago Bulls

Finals
- Champions: Boston Celtics
- Runners-up: Milwaukee Bucks
- Finals MVP: John Havlicek (Boston)

NBA seasons
- ← 1972–73 1974–75 →

The 1973–74 NBA season was the 28th season of the National Basketball Association. The season ended with the Boston Celtics winning the NBA championship, beating the Milwaukee Bucks 4 games to 3 in the NBA Finals.

Transactions

- July 1, 1972 The Golden State Warriors signed Rick Barry as a free agent after a court injunction prohibited his return to the New York Nets of the ABA.
- July 11, 1972 The New York Knicks waived Greg Fillmore.
- July 19, 1972 The Philadelphia 76ers signed Luther Green as a free agent.
- July 31, 1972 The Philadelphia 76ers traded Fred Foster to the Portland Trail Blazers for a 1973 2nd round draft pick (Allan Bristow was later selected). The Detroit Pistons traded Terry Dischinger to the Portland Trail Blazers for Fred Foster.
- August 1, 1972 The Detroit Pistons traded Jimmy Walker to the Houston Rockets for Stu Lantz.
- August 9, 1972 The Baltimore Bullets sold the player rights to Dorie Murrey to the Chicago Bulls.
- August 15, 1972 The Philadelphia 76ers sold the player rights to John Brisker to the Seattle SuperSonics.
- August 23, 1972 The Cleveland Cavaliers traded Butch Beard to the Seattle SuperSonics for Barry Clemens and Lenny Wilkens.
- August 31, 1972 The Cleveland Cavaliers traded a 1974 2nd round draft pick (Billy Knight was later selected) to the Los Angeles Lakers for Jim Cleamons.
- September 6, 1972 The Houston Rockets signed Paul McCracken as a free agent.
- September 11, 1972 The Portland Trail Blazers waived Ron Knight. The Portland Trail Blazers waived Jim Marsh. The Philadelphia 76ers signed Gary Gregor as a veteran free agent and sent a 1974 2nd round draft pick (Rubin Collins was later selected) to the Portland Trail Blazers as compensation.
- September 14, 1972 The New York Knicks waived Eddie Miles.
- September 18, 1972 The Seattle SuperSonics sold the player rights to Zaid Abdul-Aziz to the Houston Rockets. The Houston Rockets sold the player rights to Dick Cunningham to the Milwaukee Bucks.
- September 19, 1972 The Portland Trail Blazers waived Charlie Yelverton. The Los Angeles Lakers traded Paul Stovall to the Phoenix Suns for a 1974 2nd round draft pick (Truck Robinson was later selected) and a future draft pick. The Houston Rockets sold the player rights to John Gianelli to the New York Knicks.
- September 22, 1972 The Cleveland Cavaliers traded Steve Hawes to the Houston Rockets for a 1973 3rd round draft pick (James Lister was later selected).
- September 25, 1972 The Phoenix Suns waived Jeff Webb.
- September 28, 1972 The Golden State Warriors signed George Johnson as a free agent.
- September 29, 1972 The Phoenix Suns waived Art Harris. The Buffalo Braves traded a 1973 2nd round draft pick (Mike D'Antoni was later selected) to the Detroit Pistons for Howard Komives.
- October 2, 1972 The Philadelphia 76ers traded Dave Wohl to the Portland Trail Blazers for Dale Schlueter. The Houston Rockets waived Paul McCracken.
- October 3, 1972 The Golden State Warriors waived Charles Dudley.
- October 9, 1972 The Buffalo Braves claimed Bill Hewitt on waivers from the Detroit Pistons. The Kansas City-Omaha Kings traded a 1973 4th round draft pick (Clyde Turner was later selected) to the Milwaukee Bucks for Toby Kimball. The Kansas City-Omaha Kings traded Jim Fox and Dick Gibbs to the Seattle SuperSonics for Pete Cross and Don Kojis. The Atlanta Hawks traded a 1973 2nd round draft pick (Pat McFarland was later selected) to the New York Knicks for Eddie Mast. The Buffalo Braves waived Mike Davis. The Phoenix Suns waived John Wetzel.
- October 10, 1972 The Philadelphia 76ers traded a 1973 2nd round draft pick (Gary Melchionni was later selected) to the Phoenix Suns for Mel Counts. The Milwaukee Bucks traded a 1973 2nd round draft pick (Gary Melchionni was later selected) to the Philadelphia 76ers for Gary Gregor. The Philadelphia 76ers signed Mike Price as a free agent. The Portland Trail Blazers claimed Bill Turner on waivers from the Golden State Warriors. The Philadelphia 76ers signed Manny Leaks as a free agent. The Golden State Warriors waived John Tschogl.
- October 18, 1972 The Chicago Bulls traded a 1973 2nd round draft pick (Caldwell Jones was later selected) to the Philadelphia 76ers for Dennis Awtrey.
- October 20, 1972 The Chicago Bulls traded Kenny McIntosh to the Seattle SuperSonics for Gar Heard and a 1973 3rd round draft pick (Martin Terry was later selected). The Los Angeles Lakers waived Roger Brown.
- October 24, 1972 The Baltimore Bullets signed Mike Davis as a free agent. The Cleveland Cavaliers traded Charlie Davis to the Portland Trail Blazers for a 1974 3rd round draft pick (Foots Walker was later selected). The Baltimore Bullets waived Terry Driscoll.
- October 27, 1972 The Houston Rockets traded Greg Smith to the Portland Trail Blazers for Stan McKenzie.
- October 31, 1972 The Atlanta Hawks traded Don Adams to the Detroit Pistons for a 1973 2nd round draft pick (Tom Ingelsby was later selected).
- November 1, 1972 The Buffalo Braves waived Cornell Warner.
- November 2, 1972 The Los Angeles Lakers traded Leroy Ellis and John Trapp to the Philadelphia 76ers for Bill Bridges and Mel Counts. The Houston Rockets sold the player rights to Dick Gibbs to the Kansas City-Omaha Kings.
- November 4, 1972 The Cleveland Cavaliers signed Cornell Warner as a free agent.
- November 9, 1972 The Detroit Pistons traded a 1973 2nd round draft pick (Mike D'Antoni was later selected) to the Kansas City-Omaha Kings for John Mengelt. The Buffalo Braves waived Walt Hazzard.
- November 10, 1972 The Cleveland Cavaliers traded Dave Sorenson to the Philadelphia 76ers for Bob Rule.
- November 13, 1972 The Portland Trail Blazers waived Bill Turner.
- November 15, 1972 The Golden State Warriors signed Walt Hazzard as a free agent. The Milwaukee Bucks signed Terry Driscoll as a free agent.
- November 22, 1972 The Cleveland Cavaliers traded Walt Wesley to the Phoenix Suns for a 1973 2nd round draft pick (Allan Hornyak was later selected).
- December 1, 1972 The Phoenix Suns waived Gus Johnson.
- December 6, 1972 The Seattle SuperSonics claimed Pete Cross on waivers from the Kansas City-Omaha Kings. The Baltimore Bullets traded a 1973 2nd round draft pick (Jim Chones was later selected) to the Los Angeles Lakers for Flynn Robinson. The Buffalo Braves claimed Dave Wohl on waivers from the Portland Trail Blazers.
- January 2, 1973 The Los Angeles Lakers signed Bill Turner as a free agent.
- January 9, 1973 The Milwaukee Bucks waived Wali Jones.
- January 10, 1973 The Seattle SuperSonics fired Tom Nissalke as Head Coach. The Seattle SuperSonics appointed Bucky Buckwalter as Interim Head Coach.
- January 15, 1973 The Atlanta Hawks signed John Wetzel as a free agent.
- January 21, 1973 The Houston Rockets fired Tex Winter as Head Coach. The Houston Rockets hired Johnny Egan as Head Coach.
- January 23, 1973 The Philadelphia 76ers fired Roy Rubin as Head Coach. The Philadelphia 76ers appointed Kevin Loughery as Interim Head Coach.
- January 26, 1973 The Kansas City-Omaha Kings traded Tom Van Arsdale and a 1974 3rd round draft pick (Harvey Catchings was later selected) to the Philadelphia 76ers for John Block. The Atlanta Hawks traded Jeff Halliburton to the Philadelphia 76ers for a 1973 3rd round draft pick (Ted Manakas was later selected).
- January 29, 1973 The Houston Rockets signed Paul McCracken as a free agent.
- February 1, 1973 The New York Knicks signed Harthorne Wingo as a free agent. The Houston Rockets signed George Johnson as a free agent. The Atlanta Hawks traded Don May to the Philadelphia 76ers for Dale Schlueter. Schlueter was sent to Atlanta to complete the trade on April 18, 1973.
- February 5, 1973 The Detroit Pistons signed Justus Thigpen as a free agent.
- February 26, 1973 The Atlanta Hawks signed John Tschogl as a free agent. The Seattle SuperSonics signed Charles Dudley as a free agent.
- March 30, 1973 The Phoenix Suns hired John MacLeod as Head Coach.
- April 13, 1973 The Atlanta Hawks traded George Trapp to the Detroit Pistons for a 1973 1st round draft pick (Dwight Jones was later selected).
- April 24, 1973 The Cleveland Cavaliers traded John Johnson, Rick Roberson and a 1973 1st round draft pick (Barry Parkhill was later selected) to the Portland Trail Blazers for a 1973 1st round draft pick (Jim Brewer was later selected) and a 1973 3rd round draft pick (Jim O'Brien was later selected).
- April 26, 1973 The Phoenix Suns waived Bernie Fryer.
- April 27, 1973 The Seattle SuperSonics released Jim Ard.
- May 11, 1973 The Seattle SuperSonics hired Bill Russell as Head Coach.
- June 15, 1973 The Capital Bullets hired K.C. Jones as Head Coach.
- June 21, 1973 Terry Dischinger retired from the Portland Trail Blazers.
- June 27, 1973 The Portland Trail Blazers signed Bernie Fryer as a free agent.

== Notable occurrences ==
- The 1974 NBA All-Star Game was played at the Seattle Center Coliseum in Seattle, with the West beating the East 134–123. Bob Lanier of the Detroit Pistons wins the game's MVP award.
- The Baltimore Bullets relocated to the Capital Centre in the Washington, D.C. suburb of Landover, Maryland, and became the Capital Bullets; the team played their first ten home games at the Cole Field House due to construction delays.
- The NBA on CBS began. CBS' partnership with the NBA lasted 17 consecutive years, and ended in 1990, when NBC took over as the NBA's broadcast partner.
- Blocks and steals became officially recorded statistics for the first time. Elmore Smith of the Los Angeles Lakers led the league in blocks with 4.85 per game, which remains the third-highest average in league history.
- Bob McAdoo of the Buffalo Braves led the league in both points per game and field goal percentage, with averages of 30.6 and .547, respectively. He was the first player to do so since Wilt Chamberlain in 1965–66, and to date only one player has replicated the achievement: Shaquille O'Neal in 1999–2000.
- Earl Strom returns to officiating in the NBA following a four-year absence. Strom left the NBA for the American Basketball Association in 1969 over a salary dispute and officiated there for three seasons, then did not officiate at all in 1972–73. Strom would continue with the NBA through the 1989–90 season and earned enshrinement in the Naismith Basketball Hall of Fame in 1995.

Coaching changes
Offseason
Team	1972–73 coach	1973–74 coach
Baltimore/Capital Bullets	Gene Shue	K. C. Jones
Phoenix Suns	Jerry Colangelo	John MacLeod
Philadelphia 76ers	Kevin Loughery	Gene Shue
Seattle SuperSonics	Bucky Buckwalter	Bill Russell
In-season
Team	Outgoing coach	Incoming coach
Kansas City-Omaha Kings	Bob Cousy; Draff Young	Phil Johnson

== Season recap ==
The NBA opened the year still very impressed with the New York Knicks' second-ever NBA title from a year ago. Much publicized, the team largely played this year as a victory lap, particularly after cornerstone Dave DeBusschere announced his pending retirement halfway through the season. Their opponent in three of the last four NBA Finals, the Los Angeles Lakers, also went through some key changes. Wilt Chamberlain had accepted an offer to be playing coach of the San Diego Conquistadors of the ABA. The Lakers, however, sued Chamberlain to prevent his playing in the ABA while still owing Los Angeles the option year of his contract. Chamberlain never played professional basketball again, and left most of his coaching duties in the ABA to assistant Stan Albeck, who went on to be a head coach in the NBA. Jerry West played just 31 games due to injury, and that likewise spelled the end to his nearly peerless career at guard. He later returned to the club as coach and general manager.

After carrying the NBA to new heights thanks to their success and location in major media markets, the Knicks and Lakers were poised to decline, giving runners-up from a year ago a chance to ascend.

There were no 60-win teams that season, but four teams did win over 50 games. Two of them, Milwaukee and Boston cast strong shadows all season long, each led by powerful individual forces determined to win.

Milwaukee won a league-most 59 of 82 NBA games, led again by superstar Kareem Abdul-Jabbar. Kareem had not seen the NBA Finals since the controversial changing of his name, but now had no Wilt Chamberlain to prevent his return. He averaged 27 points per game, making more field goals, 948, than any player in the league. The Bucks were again the top shooting team in the NBA and led in average margin of points over opponents as well. Second in minutes played and in the new blocked shots category, Abdul-Jabbar was a peerless presence all season long. One player, Atlanta's high-scoring Pete Maravich, had more shots, but Kareem sank his tries at a 53.9% clip, the second-best in the NBA. The rest of the Bucks lineup provided good support for Abdul-Jabbar, but age and injuries remained a concern into the playoffs.

The Boston Celtics cast a shadow across the East with 56 wins, willed by 33-year-old team captain John Havlicek. The swingman was again All-Defense while scoring 22.8 points per game. Hondo made it to the NBA's top assists category with six per game on average. However, more impressive than Havlicek was the standout play of 6' 9 245-pound center Dave Cowens. Cowens added 19 points per game and was second in the NBA in rebounds, leading the best board team in the league. Like Milwaukee's Abdul-Jabbar, he was a fixture in minutes played. But he had a solid team around him, including guard Jo Jo White.

Milwaukee's 59 wins won the Midwest Division, but not by much. The Chicago Bulls and Detroit Pistons each again posted strong campaigns to finish second and third in the division, with the third and fourth-best records in the entire league.

Chicago, led by coach Dick Motta, followed the same formula of scoring from the forwards and strong defense overall. Forward Bob Love carried the team with an average of 21.8 points per game. The Bulls impressed all season long in being able to deny opponents easy shots with strong, clean defense that did not often foul. Cliff Ray stepped in for an injured Tom Boerwinkle and performed solidly. Jerry Sloan and Norm Van Lier were each in the top ten in the new steals category, Sloan ranking fourth in the NBA.

Detroit's hard-luck team showed some of its potential this year. Former player Ray Scott had taken over for Butch Van Breda Kolff's controversial mentorship and was now leading a winner. Bob Lanier emerged as the solid center with 22.5 points per game on 50% shooting and 13.3 rebounds with four assists per game. Bob also averaged three blocks a game. Former scoring champion Dave Bing was back, carrying his club with seven assists per game and adding 18.8 per game in scoring. Vision problems still dogged him, hampering what had once looked like a sure Hall Of Fame career. Detroit's 52 wins would have won the Pacific Division. Third in the Midwest, they simply hoped to be allowed into the playoffs.

Five other NBA teams won half their games to make a total of nine out of 17 total teams; there were no disasters like there had been a year ago. The playoff format took a closer look at records this year to answer criticisms of recent years past that had strongly tied playoff selections to the league's four divisions. It allowed some deserving teams to participate, which many were glad to see.

== Final standings ==
=== By division ===
Atlantic Division	W	L	PCT	GB	Home	Road	Neutral	Div
y-Boston Celtics	56	26	.683	–	26–6	21–18	9–2	17–5
x-New York Knicks	49	33	.598	7	28–13	21–19	0–1	10–12
x-Buffalo Braves	42	40	.512	14	19–13	17–21	6–6	12–10
Philadelphia 76ers	25	57	.305	31	14–23	9–30	2–4	5–17

Central Division	W	L	PCT	GB	Home	Road	Neutral	Div
y-Capital Bullets	47	35	.573	–	31–10	15–25	1–0	14–8
Atlanta Hawks	35	47	.427	12	23–18	12–25	0–4	13–9
Houston Rockets	32	50	.390	15	18–23	13–25	1–2	9–13
Cleveland Cavaliers	29	53	.354	18	18–23	11–28	0–2	8–14

Midwest Division	W	L	PCT	GB	Home	Road	Neutral	Div
y-Milwaukee Bucks	59	23	.720	–	31–7	24–16	4–0	14–6
x-Chicago Bulls	54	28	.659	5	32–9	21–19	1–0	13–7
x-Detroit Pistons	52	30	.634	7	29–12	23–17	0–1	9–11
Kansas City–Omaha Kings	33	49	.402	26	20–21	13–28	–	4–16

Pacific Division	W	L	PCT	GB	Home	Road	Neutral	Div
y-Los Angeles Lakers	47	35	.573	–	30–11	17–24	–	14–12
Golden State Warriors	44	38	.537	3	23–18	20–20	1–0	15–11
Seattle SuperSonics	36	46	.439	11	22–19	14–27	–	12–14
Phoenix Suns	30	52	.366	17	24–17	6–34	0–1	11–15
Portland Trail Blazers	27	55	.329	20	22–19	5–34	0–2	13–13

=== By conference ===
#	Eastern Conference				
#	Team	W	L	PCT	GB
1	z-Boston Celtics	56	26	.683	–
2	x-New York Knicks	49	33	.598	7
3	y-Capital Bullets	47	35	.573	9
4	x-Buffalo Braves	42	40	.512	14
5	Atlanta Hawks	35	47	.427	21
6	Houston Rockets	32	50	.390	24
7	Cleveland Cavaliers	29	53	.354	27
8	Philadelphia 76ers	25	57	.305	31

#	Western Conference				
#	Team	W	L	PCT	GB
1	z-Milwaukee Bucks	59	23	.720	–
2	x-Chicago Bulls	54	28	.659	5
3	x-Detroit Pistons	52	30	.634	7
4	y-Los Angeles Lakers	47	35	.573	12
5	Golden State Warriors	44	38	.537	15
6	Seattle SuperSonics	36	46	.439	23
7	Kansas City–Omaha Kings	33	49	.402	26
8	Phoenix Suns	30	52	.366	29
9	Portland Trail Blazers	27	55	.329	32

Notes

- z, y – division champions
- x – clinched playoff spot

== Playoffs ==
=== Bracket ===
Conference Semifinals
E1	Boston*	4
E4	Buffalo	2
Eastern Conference
E3	Capital*	3
E2	New York	4
W1	Milwaukee*	4
W4	Los Angeles*	1
Western Conference
W3	Detroit	3
W2	Chicago	4

Conference Finals
E1	Boston*	4
E2	New York	1
W1	Milwaukee*	4
W2	Chicago	0

NBA Finals
E1	Boston*	4
W1	Milwaukee*	3

- * Division winner
- Bold Series winner
- Italic Team with home-court advantage

=== Summary ===
Boston met 42–40 Buffalo in Round One, the Braves finishing as a third-place team in the Atlantic Division. The Braves were led by Bob McAdoo, who averaged 30.6 points per game and 54.7% accuracy. McAdoo was also among the NBA's top five rebounders and shot blockers. Jack Ramsay positioned Ernie DiGregorio as the point guard leading their offense. The six-game series was very close, with the last three games decided by three points or less. However, Boston's defense gave them a series win four games to two.

The aging Knicks had dropped to 49 wins to finish second in the Atlantic, and again drew the Bullets as their first playoff opponents --- the Capital City Bullets. Washington, D.C. was slyly and slowly taking over Baltimore's team. But the 47-win Bullets were still largely the same bunch. Elvin Hayes and Phil Chenier were the team stars this year, with Wes Unseld battling knee injuries. Hayes had stepped up to lead the NBA in rebounds. The 6'10 240-pounder was also a leading shot blocker, while Chenier proved to be one of the league's best all-around guards at both ends of the floor. Now coached by former Celtic K.C. Jones, the team gave the Knicks a tough full-seven-game series, but the outcome was the same. Game Four went to overtime and Game Five ended 106–105, both Knick wins. Boston and New York were now set for another huge East final.

Milwaukee met the 47-win Los Angeles Lakers, winners of the Pacific, in the first round, but these were now different Lakers. Elmore Smith had come over from Buffalo to lead the league in blocks. Connie Hawkins had come over from Phoenix, and Happy Hairston was back on the boards. Gail Goodrich continued to bewilder critics with a 25.3 scoring average, trying and making more free throws than any other NBA player making 86% of his shots. Like the Knicks, the Lakers core were veterans with a lot of experience but also a lot of miles on their feet. The Bucks blew them out for a 4–1 series win which signaled a clear change between the two teams in their rich rivalry.

Chicago got to meet Detroit in a seven-game war, using their fourth home game to barely survive the Pistons. Five of the seven games were decided by five points or less, all hotly competitive. Bob Lanier tried mightily to make up for his forwards, but the all-star fell just short. Milwaukee and Chicago kept that Midwest theme alive in the second round for the West final.

Boston stated they would not play around with New York this year, with two big double-digit romps to start the series. The Knicks, now led by a backcourt of Walt Frazier and Earl Monroe, beat Boston in Game Three. That proved a final parting shot for the New Yorkers who had been in three of the last four NBA Finals, with Boston leading a 4–1 series win.

Chicago's forwards and guards appeared to outplay Milwaukee for four games. But Ray was no match for Abdul-Jabbar at center, and coach Larry Costello's team got a good bench boost as well to pound the Bulls in four straight. Only Game Two in Chicago had been close. Kareem was just as determined as Havlicek.

Milwaukee was favored in the NBA Finals, with Cowens looking up at the 7' 2 Abdul-Jabbar. But the Boston center conceded nothing, averaging 20 points and 13 rebounds in courageous play. The series would be a classic, going the full seven games. Kareem got some solid help in the shooting of Bobby Dandridge and the passing of 35-year-old Oscar Robertson. But the Celtics hung tough, even after losing 102–101 in a legendary double-overtime affair at Boston Garden that saw Abdul-Jabbar throw in a 15-foot hook shot to win the game at the buzzer.

Game Seven in Milwaukee saw the Bucks poised to win their second title in four years. But Cowens turned in a huge 28-point game with aggressive defense to push the Celtics to a 102–87 upset. Havlicek had averaged 27 points and six assists in 18 playoff games to win his first NBA title ring without Bill Russell. But it was Cowens, who had saved his best game for last, who stood out most in proving he was in fact center enough to lead an NBA champion past the taller giants of the league.

== Statistics leaders ==
Category	Player	Team	Stat
Points per game	Bob McAdoo	Buffalo Braves	30.6
Rebounds per game	Elvin Hayes	Capital Bullets	18.1
Assists per game	Ernie DiGregorio	Buffalo Braves	8.2
Steals per game	Larry Steele	Portland Trail Blazers	2.68
Blocks per game	Elmore Smith	Los Angeles Lakers	4.85
FG%	Bob McAdoo	Buffalo Braves	.547
FT%	Ernie DiGregorio	Buffalo Braves	.902

== NBA awards ==
- Most Valuable Player: Kareem Abdul-Jabbar, Milwaukee Bucks
- Rookie of the Year: Ernie DiGregorio, Buffalo Braves
- Coach of the Year: Ray Scott, Detroit Pistons
- All-NBA First Team:
  - F – Rick Barry, Golden State Warriors
  - F – John Havlicek, Boston Celtics
  - C – Kareem Abdul-Jabbar, Milwaukee Bucks
  - G – Walt Frazier, New York Knicks
  - G – Gail Goodrich, Los Angeles Lakers
- All-NBA Second Team:
  - F – Elvin Hayes, Capital Bullets
  - F – Spencer Haywood, Seattle SuperSonics
  - C – Bob McAdoo, Buffalo Braves
  - G – Dave Bing, Detroit Pistons
  - G – Norm Van Lier, Chicago Bulls
- All-NBA Rookie Team:
  - Ernie DiGregorio, Buffalo Braves
  - Nick Weatherspoon, Capital Bullets
  - Mike Bantom, Phoenix Suns
  - John Brown, Atlanta Hawks
  - Ron Behagen, Kansas City-Omaha Kings
- NBA All-Defensive First Team:
  - Dave DeBusschere, New York Knicks
  - John Havlicek, Boston Celtics
  - Kareem Abdul-Jabbar, Milwaukee Bucks
  - Norm Van Lier, Chicago Bulls
  - Walt Frazier, New York Knicks (tie)
  - Jerry Sloan, Chicago Bulls (tie)
- NBA All-Defensive Second Team:
  - Elvin Hayes, Capital Bullets
  - Bob Love, Chicago Bulls
  - Nate Thurmond, Golden State Warriors
  - Don Chaney, Boston Celtics
  - Dick Van Arsdale, Phoenix Suns (tie)
  - Jim Price, Los Angeles Lakers (tie)

== See also ==
- 1974 NBA Finals
- 1974 NBA playoffs
- 1973–74 ABA season
- List of NBA regular season records
