= Dean Tolson =

American basketball player

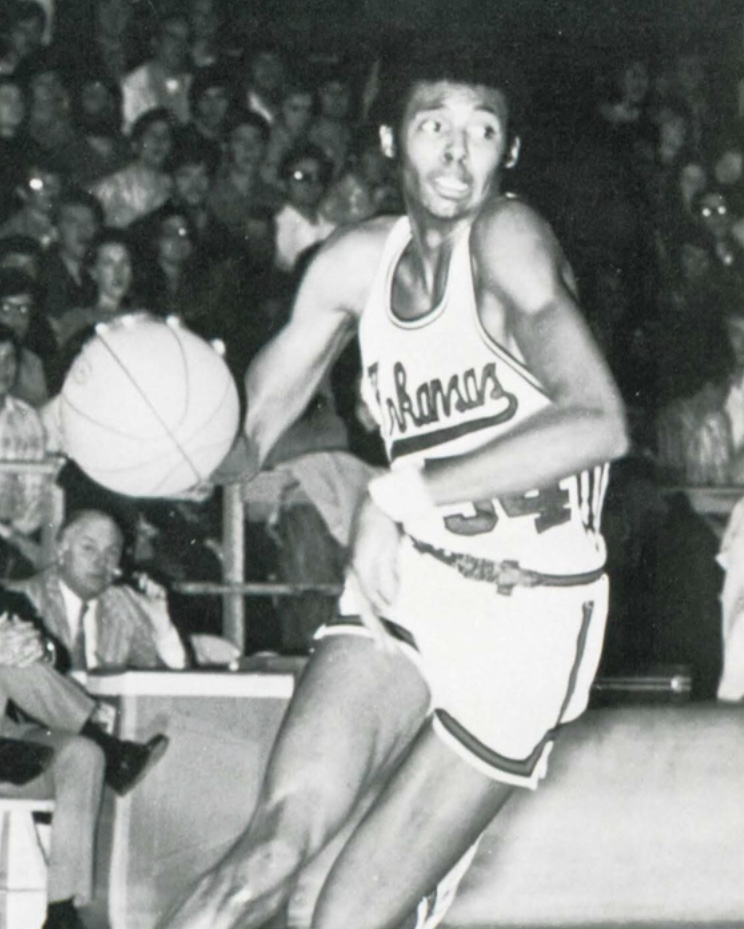
- Tolson as a sophomore at Arkansas

Personal information
- Born: November 25, 1951 (age 74) Kansas City, Missouri, U.S.
- Listed height: 6 ft 8 in (2.03 m)
- Listed weight: 190 lb (86 kg)

Career information
- High school: Central (Kansas City, Missouri)
- College: Arkansas (1971–1974)
- NBA draft: 1974: 5th round, 80th overall pick
- Drafted by: Seattle SuperSonics
- Playing career: 1974–1981
- Position: Power forward
- Number: 20

Career history
- 1974–1975: Seattle SuperSonics
- 1975–1976: Hazleton Bullets
- 1976–1977: Seattle SuperSonics
- 1977–1979: Anchorage Northern Knights
- 1979: Gilbey's Gin
- 1980–1981: Rochester Zeniths
- 1981: St. George's Whiskies

Career highlights
- CBA champion (1980); All-EBA Second Team (1976); CBA blocks leader (1979)
- Stats at NBA.com
- Stats at Basketball Reference

Byron Dean Tolson (born November 25, 1951) is an American former professional basketball player. Tolson played three seasons for the Seattle SuperSonics of the National Basketball Association (NBA). He played college basketball for the Arkansas Razorbacks.

== Professional career ==
Tolson was selected by the Seattle SuperSonics in the 5th round (8th pick, 80th overall) of the 1974 NBA draft, after completing his career at the University of Arkansas. He played three seasons for the SuperSonics, appearing in 80 games over his career.

Tolson was also selected in the 7th round of the 1974 American Basketball Association Draft by the New York Nets.

Tolson played in the Eastern Basketball Association (EBA) / Continental Basketball Association (CBA) for the Hazleton Bullets during the 1975–76 season, the Anchorage Northern Knights from 1977 to 1979 and Rochester Zeniths during the 1980–81 season. He was selected to the All-EBA Second Team in 1976.

Tolson played eleven years internationally before returning to school to complete his education at the University of Arkansas. He played for Greek club AEK B.C. in the 1983–84 FIBA Korać Cup.

In 2023, Dean Tolson's book, ‘Power Forward: My Journey from Illiterate NBA Player to a Magna Cum Laude Master's Degree,’ was published. A motivational speaker, he moved from Tacoma, Washington, and lives in Scottsdale, Arizona.

== Career statistics ==
Legend
GP	Games played	GS	Games started	MPG	Minutes per game
FG%	Field goal percentage	3P%	3-point field goal percentage	FT%	Free throw percentage
RPG	Rebounds per game	APG	Assists per game	SPG	Steals per game
BPG	Blocks per game	PPG	Points per game	**Bold**	Career high

=== NBA ===
==== Regular season ====
Year	Team	GP	MPG	FG%	FT%	RPG	APG	SPG	BPG	PPG
1974–75	Seattle	19	4.6	.432	**.647**	1.2	.3	.2	.3	2.3
1976–77	Seattle	**60**	**9.8**	**.566**	.535	**2.6**	.5	**.5**	**.4**	**6.0**
1977–78	Seattle	1	7.0	.000	–	.0	**2.0**	.0	.0	.0
Career		80	8.5	.546	.545	2.2	.4	.5	.3	5.0

==== Playoffs ====
Year	Team	GP	MPG	FG%	FT%	RPG	APG	SPG	BPG	PPG
1975	Seattle	4	5.5	.125	1.000	1.8	.3	.0	.0	1.0
