= 1974–75 Los Angeles Lakers season =

NBA professional basketball team season

- Head coach: Bill Sharman
- Arena: The Forum

Results
- Record: 30–52 (.366)
- Place: Division: 5th (Pacific); Conference: 9th (Western)
- Playoff finish: Did not qualify
- Stats at Basketball Reference

The 1974–75 Los Angeles Lakers season was the Lakers' 27th season in the NBA and 15th season in Los Angeles. The team finished with 30 wins and 52 losses. This was the first year that the Lakers missed the playoffs in Los Angeles, and the first year since 1958 that the Lakers failed to make the playoffs overall. This was also the first year they failed to win the Pacific Division.

For the first time since 1959–60, and in turn since the team arrived in L.A., Jerry West was not on the roster; he retired prior to the season.

== Roster ==
1974-75 Los Angeles Lakers roster
Players

Pos.	No.	Player	Height	Weight	DOB	From
PG	40	Lucius Allen	6 ft 2 in (1.88 m)	175 lb (79 kg)		UCLA
F	10	Corky Calhoun	6 ft 7 in (2.01 m)	210 lb (95 kg)	1950-11-01	Penn
G	25	Gail Goodrich	6 ft 1 in (1.85 m)	170 lb (77 kg)	1943-04-23	UCLA
F	52	Happy Hairston	6 ft 7 in (2.01 m)	255 lb (116 kg)	1942-05-31	NYU
F/C	42	Connie Hawkins	6 ft 8 in (2.03 m)	210 lb (95 kg)	1942-07-17	Iowa
F	33	Cazzie Russell	6 ft 5 in (1.96 m)	218 lb (99 kg)		Michigan
SG	23	Stu Lantz	6 ft 3 in (1.91 m)	175 lb (79 kg)	1946-07-13	Nebraska
G	12	Pat Riley	6 ft 4 in (1.93 m)	205 lb (93 kg)	1945-03-20	Kentucky
C	3	Elmore Smith	7 ft 0 in (2.13 m)	250 lb (113 kg)	1949-05-09	Kentucky State
F	24	Kermit Washington	6 ft 8 in (2.03 m)	230 lb (104 kg)	1951-09-17	American
G	20	Brian Winters	6 ft 4 in (1.93 m)	185 lb (84 kg)	1952-03-01	South Carolina

Coaches
Head coach
- Bill Sharman
Assistant(s)
- John Barnhill
- Larry Creger

Legend
- (DP) Unsigned draft pick
- (FA) Free agent
- (S) Suspended
- Injured

== Regular season ==
=== Season standings ===
Pacific Division	W	L	PCT	GB	Home	Road	Div
y-Golden State Warriors	48	34	.585	–	31–10	17–24	19–11
x-Seattle SuperSonics	43	39	.524	5	24–16	19–23	18–12
Portland Trail Blazers	38	44	.463	10	29–13	9–31	16–14
Phoenix Suns	32	50	.390	16	22–19	10–31	12–18
Los Angeles Lakers	30	52	.366	18	21–20	9–32	10–20

#	Western Conference				
#	Team	W	L	PCT	GB
1	z-Golden State Warriors	48	34	.585	–
2	y-Chicago Bulls	47	35	.573	1
3	x-Kansas City–Omaha Kings	44	38	.537	4
4	x-Seattle SuperSonics	43	39	.524	5
5	x-Detroit Pistons	40	42	.488	8
6	Portland Trail Blazers	38	44	.463	10
6	Milwaukee Bucks	38	44	.463	10
8	Phoenix Suns	32	50	.390	16
9	Los Angeles Lakers	30	52	.366	18

z – clinched division title
y – clinched division title
x – clinched playoff spot

=== Season schedule ===
1974–75 game log
Total: 30–52 (home: 21–20; road: 9–32)
October: 3–3 (home: 2–2; road: 1–1)

Game	Date	Team	Score	High points	High rebounds	High assists	Location Attendance	Record
1	October 18	Golden State	90–105	Gail Goodrich (34)	Happy Hairston (18)	Jim Price (9)	The Forum; 12,772	1–0
2	October 20	Kansas City–Omaha	105–95	Pat Riley (30)	Happy Hairston (22)	Gail Goodrich (8)	The Forum; 11,128	1–1
3	October 25	Detroit	110–107	Goodrich, Price (21)	Happy Hairston (17)	Price (8)	The Forum; 12,044	1–2
4	October 27	Phoenix	116–123	Goodrich, Price (27)	Happy Hairston (22)	Goodrich, Price (10)	The Forum; 10,579	2–2
5	October 29	@ Portland	105–102	Goodrich, Price (23)	Beaty, Hairston (9)	Gail Goodrich (8)	Memorial Coliseum; 10,608	3–2
6	October 30	@ Seattle	97–117	Gail Goodrich (20)	Happy Hairston (13)	Gail Goodrich (7)	Seattle Center Coliseum; 8,938	3–3

November: 5–9 (home: 4–5; road: 1–4)

Game	Date	Team	Score	High points	High rebounds	High assists	Location Attendance	Record
7	November 1	Milwaukee	86–109	Gail Goodrich (29)	Happy Hairston (17)	Jim Price (9)	The Forum; 12,219	4–3
8	November 3	Buffalo	124–101	Jim Price (23)	Zelmo Beaty (8)	Jim Price (9)	The Forum; 13,119	4–4
9	November 8	New York	117–105	Jim Price (26)	Happy Hairston (19)	Brian Winters (5)	The Forum; 13,304	4–5
10	November 10	Golden State	106–103	Gail Goodrich (32)	Happy Hairston (17)	Lucius Allen (7)	The Forum; 11,328	4–6
11	November 13	@ Seattle	103–108	Pat Riley (25)	Happy Hairston (12)	Gail Goodrich (11)	Seattle Center Coliseum; 13,004	4–7
12	November 15	Philadelphia	99–105	Lucius Allen (24)	Happy Hairston (24)	Allen, Goodrich (8)	The Forum; 10,868	5–7
13	November 16	@ Portland	99–112	Gail Goodrich (22)	Happy Hairston (15)	Gail Goodrich (7)	Memorial Coliseum; 11,912	5–8
14	November 17	Chicago	96–76	Gail Goodrich (21)	Happy Hairston (10)	Lucius Allen (4)	The Forum; 12,417	5–9
15	November 22	Houston	83–89	Gail Goodrich (23)	Happy Hairston (14)	Allen, Goodrich (5)	The Forum; 10,411	6–9
16	November 24	Washington	111–108	Gail Goodrich (33)	Elmore Smith (15)	Lucius Allen (7)	The Forum; 11,857	6–10
17	November 26	@ Milwaukee	105–102	Pat Riley (18)	Happy Hairston (17)	Happy Hairston (5)	MECCA Arena; 10,938	7–10
18	November 27	@ Kansas City–Omaha	89–107	Hawkins, Smith (19)	Elmore Smith (17)	Lucius Allen (4)	Kemper Arena; 6,463	7–11
19	November 29	New Orleans	122–127	Pat Riley (38)	Happy Hairston (16)	Lucius Allen (8)	The Forum; 11,224	8–11
20	November 30	@ Golden State	118–128	Lucius Allen (27)	Elmore Smith (14)	Lucius Allen (8)	Oakland-Alameda County Coliseum Arena; 2,576	8–12

December: 7–9 (home: 5–2; road: 2–7)

Game	Date	Team	Score	High points	High rebounds	High assists	Location Attendance	Record
21	December 1	Phoenix	105–111 (OT)	Elmore Smith (29)	Elmore Smith (20)	Allen, Riley (6)	The Forum; 10,157	9–12
22	December 3	@ New York	95–100	Lucius Allen (33)	Elmore Smith (13)	Allen, Hawkins (4)	Madison Square Garden; 19,011	9–13
23	December 4	@ Boston	90–101	Lucius Allen (24)	Elmore Smith (16)	Pat Riley (6)	Boston Garden; 8,881	9–14
24	December 6	Atlanta	84–100	Lucius Allen (32)	Happy Hairston (19)	Lucius Allen (12)	The Forum; 10,266	10–14
25	December 7	@ Phoenix	88–92	Lucius Allen (25)	Happy Hairston (10)	Lucius Allen (7)	Arizona Veterans Memorial Coliseum; 5,603	10–15
26	December 8	Phoenix	102–107	Allen, Smith (19)	Elmore Smith (10)	Lucius Allen (13)	The Forum; 11,124	11–15
27	December 13	Seattle	93–109	Lucius Allen (30)	Elmore Smith (23)	Gail Goodrich (10)	The Forum; 10,296	12–15
28	December 15	@ Portland	97–100	Lucius Allen (26)	Elmore Smith (23)	Elmore Smith (5)	Memorial Coliseum; 9,852	12–16
29	December 17	Cleveland	119–106	Gail Goodrich (35)	Happy Hairston (15)	Lucius Allen (10)	The Forum; 10,009	12–17
30	December 20	Detroit	103–102	Gail Goodrich (24)	Happy Hairston (13)	Hairston, Hawkins (7)	The Forum; 9,667	12–18
31	December 21	@ Phoenix	104–114	Gail Goodrich (30)	Happy Hairston (13)	Gail Goodrich (7)	Arizona Veterans Memorial Coliseum; 5,437	12–19
32	December 22	Portland	102–115	Gail Goodrich (44)	Elmore Smith (18)	Gail Goodrich (10)	The Forum; 13,440	13–19
33	December 26	@ Cleveland	99–89	Allen, Goodrich (28)	Happy Hairston (19)	Allen, Goodrich, Washington (4)	Richfield Coliseum; 12,526	14–19
34	December 27	@ Chicago	105–93	Lucius Allen (37)	Happy Hairston (18)	Allen, Goodrich, Smith (4)	Chicago Stadium; 11,148	15–19
35	December 28	@ Atlanta	89–106	Lucius Allen (18)	Corky Calhoun (17)	Gail Goodrich (4)	Omni Coliseum; 5,418	15–20
36	December 30	@ Houston	107–120	Elmore Smith (26)	Happy Hairston (17)	Allen, Goodrich (6)	Hofheinz Pavilion; 4,183	15–21

January: 4–8 (home: 2–2; road: 2–6)

Game	Date	Team	Score	High points	High rebounds	High assists	Location Attendance	Record
37	January 3	Boston	127–106	Elmore Smith (30)	Elmore Smith (11)	Gail Goodrich (7)	The Forum; 16,955	15–22
38	January 5	Washington	109–112 (OT)	Stu Lantz (25)	Happy Hairston (19)	Lucius Allen (9)	The Forum; 13,386	16–22
39	January 7	@ Buffalo	107–115	Lucius Allen (19)	Elmore Smith (14)	Gail Goodrich (9)	Buffalo Memorial Auditorium; 8,380	16–23
40	January 8	@ Philadelphia	106–98	Gail Goodrich (34)	Elmore Smith (11)	Allen, Goodrich (6)	The Spectrum; 7,645	17–23
41	January 10	@ Boston	97–103	Goodrich, Lantz (24)	Happy Hairston (8)	Gail Goodrich (10)	Boston Garden; 13,385	17–24
42	January 11	@ Washington	90–102	Gail Goodrich (22)	Elmore Smith (14)	Lucius Allen (7)	Capital Centre; 13,868	17–25
43	January 21	@ Golden State	108–138	Cazzie Russell (24)	Elmore Smith (13)	Lucius Allen (6)	Oakland-Alameda County Coliseum Arena; 7,847	17–26
44	January 24	New Orleans	108–110	Gail Goodrich (20)	Happy Hairston (18)	Gail Goodrich (9)	The Forum; 10,880	18–26
45	January 26	Philadelphia	103–97	Gail Goodrich (24)	Happy Hairston (23)	Gail Goodrich (8)	The Forum; 10,618	18–27
46	January 28	@ Houston	89–104	Gail Goodrich (22)	Elmore Smith (17)	Lucius Allen (6)	Hofheinz Pavilion; 2,156	18–28
47	January 29	@ New Orleans	112–108	Gail Goodrich (34)	Happy Hairston (12)	Lucius Allen (7)	Loyola Field House; 2,887	19–28
48	January 31	@ Phoenix	101–105	Gail Goodrich (34)	Happy Hairston (22)	Happy Hairston (6)	Arizona Veterans Memorial Coliseum; 5,871	19–29

February: 3–11 (home: 2–5; road: 1–6)

Game	Date	Team	Score	High points	High rebounds	High assists	Location Attendance	Record
49	February 2	Seattle	119–112	Lucius Allen (23)	Happy Hairston (17)	Allen, Goodrich (8)	The Forum; 11,586	19–30
50	February 4	@ New York	94–109	Lucius Allen (23)	Happy Hairston (14)	Allen, Goodrich (4)	Madison Square Garden; 18,112	19–31
51	February 5	@ Philadelphia	113–110 (2OT)	Allen, Goodrich (27)	Happy Hairston (20)	Gail Goodrich (10)	The Spectrum; 5,209	20–31
52	February 7	@ Buffalo	98–108	Brian Winters (22)	Happy Hairston (19)	Lucius Allen (9)	Buffalo Memorial Auditorium; 10,742	20–32
53	February 9	@ Detroit	96–97	Gail Goodrich (27)	Happy Hairston (15)	Allen, Goodrich (8)	Cobo Arena; 7,227	20–33
54	February 11	Buffalo	112–108	Gail Goodrich (26)	Elmore Smith (14)	Lucius Allen (10)	The Forum; 14,114	20–34
55	February 14	Atlanta	100–108	Cazzie Russell (27)	Happy Hairston (20)	Cazzie Russell (6)	The Forum; 10,294	21–34
56	February 16	@ Seattle	87–109	Cazzie Russell (24)	Happy Hairston (19)	Cazzie Russell (5)	Seattle Center Coliseum; 12,053	21–35
57	February 18	@ Chicago	105–128	Cazzie Russell (20)	Happy Hairston (15)	Happy Hairston (4)	Chicago Stadium; 10,214	21–36
58	February 19	@ Kansas City–Omaha	92–115	Brian Winters (18)	Happy Hairston (19)	Goodrich, Russell, Winters (3)	Kemper Arena; 8,329	21–37
59	February 21	Golden State	105–93	Gail Goodrich (25)	Elmore Smith (16)	Lucius Allen (6)	The Forum; 11,950	21–38
60	February 23	Boston	119–115	Lucius Allen (26)	Elmore Smith (17)	Gail Goodrich (8)	The Forum; 13,723	21–39
61	February 26	Portland	117–116 (2OT)	Lucius Allen (39)	Elmore Smith (18)	Gail Goodrich (9)	The Forum; 10,599	21–40
62	February 28	Cleveland	105–109	Lucius Allen (27)	Elmore Smith (18)	Russell, Winters (5)	The Forum; 11,203	22–40

March: 8–8 (home: 6–2; road: 2–6)

Game	Date	Team	Score	High points	High rebounds	High assists	Location Attendance	Record
63	March 2	@ Washington	104–117	Gail Goodrich (20)	Happy Hairston (14)	Happy Hairston (6)	Capital Centre; 8,020	22–41
64	March 4	@ Atlanta	97–109	Goodrich, Russell (26)	Kermit Washington (16)	Happy Hairston (4)	Omni Coliseum; 2,738	22–42
65	March 5	@ New Orleans	117–123	Lucius Allen (29)	Hairston, Smith (9)	Lucius Allen (6)	Municipal Auditorium; 6,554	22–43
66	March 7	Chicago	89–87	Brian Winters (30)	Kermit Washington (20)	Gail Goodrich (9)	The Forum; 11,116	22–44
67	March 9	Houston	95–116	Gail Goodrich (34)	Elmore Smith (16)	Gail Goodrich (14)	The Forum; 11,261	23–44
68	March 11	@ Detroit	95–94	Gail Goodrich (25)	Kermit Washington (10)	Pat Riley (8)	Cobo Arena; 6,263	24–44
69	March 13	@ Cleveland	85–104	Cazzie Russell (23)	Kermit Washington (14)	Goodrich, Lantz (4)	Richfield Coliseum; 4,735	24–45
70	March 14	@ Milwaukee	105–104	Gail Goodrich (30)	Elmore Smith (11)	Gail Goodrich (7)	MECCA Arena; 10,938	25–45
71	March 16	Golden State	95–111	Gail Goodrich (37)	Elmore Smith (22)	Gail Goodrich (9)	The Forum; 11,019	26–45
72	March 18	New York	109–100	Cazzie Russell (29)	Kermit Washington (18)	Gail Goodrich (11)	The Forum; 10,963	26–46
73	March 21	Seattle	109–112 (OT)	Gail Goodrich (30)	Elmore Smith (17)	Elmore Smith (7)	The Forum; 10,102	27–46
74	March 23	Milwaukee	97–116	Gail Goodrich (36)	Elmore Smith (17)	Stu Lantz (10)	The Forum; 14,121	28–46
75	March 25	@ Golden State	122–139	Cazzie Russell (26)	Kermit Washington (11)	Stu Lantz (9)	Oakland-Alameda County Coliseum Arena; 7,806	28–47
76	March 26	@ Seattle	89–110	Brian Winters (24)	Beaty, Hairston (9)	Gail Goodrich (7)	Seattle Center Coliseum; 12,128	28–48
77	March 28	Kansas City–Omaha	103–114	Gail Goodrich (53)	Happy Hairston (24)	Brian Winters (5)	The Forum; 11,243	29–48
78	March 30	Phoenix	90–104	Gail Goodrich (28)	Elmore Smith (15)	Stu Lantz (11)	The Forum; 8,546	30–48

April: 0–4 (home: 0–2; road: 0–2)

Game	Date	Team	Score	High points	High rebounds	High assists	Location Attendance	Record
79	April 1	Portland	124–106	Gail Goodrich (26)	Zelmo Beaty (11)	Lantz, Winters (6)	The Forum; 10,603	30–49
80	April 2	@ Phoenix	106–108	Cazzie Russell (27)	Zelmo Beaty (11)	Gail Goodrich (6)	Arizona Veterans Memorial Coliseum; 5,610	30–50
81	April 4	Seattle	111–102	Gail Goodrich (33)	Kermit Washington (21)	Washington, Winters (6)	The Forum; 10,946	30–51
82	April 6	@ Portland	97–126	Cazzie Russell (25)	Kermit Washington (17)	Stu Lantz (7)	Memorial Coliseum; 10,323	30–52

Source: www.basketball-reference.com

== Awards and records ==
- Gail Goodrich, NBA All-Star Game
- Brian Winters, NBA All-Rookie Team 1st Team
