= Happy Hairston =

American basketball player (1942–2001)

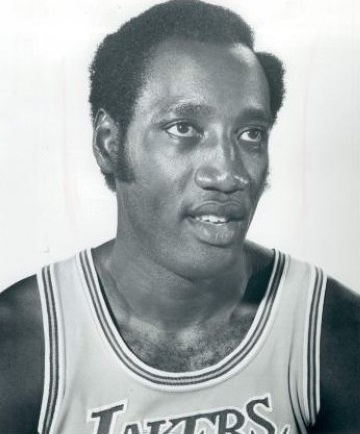
- Hairston in 1974

Personal information
- Born: May 31, 1942 Winston-Salem, North Carolina, U.S.
- Died: May 1, 2001 (aged 58) Los Angeles, California, U.S.
- Listed height: 6 ft 7 in (2.01 m)
- Listed weight: 225 lb (102 kg)

Career information
- High school: Atkins (Winston-Salem, North Carolina)
- College: NYU (1961–1964)
- NBA draft: 1964: 4th round, 33rd overall pick
- Drafted by: Cincinnati Royals
- Playing career: 1964–1975
- Position: Power forward / small forward
- Number: 22, 5, 52

Career history
- 1964–1968: Cincinnati Royals
- 1968–1969: Detroit Pistons
- 1969–1975: Los Angeles Lakers

Career highlights
- NBA champion (1972)

Career statistics
- Points: 11,505 (14.8 ppg)
- Rebounds: 8,019 (10.3 rpg)
- Assists: 1,268 (1.6 apg)
- Stats at NBA.com
- Stats at Basketball Reference

Harold "Happy" Hairston (May 31, 1942 – May 1, 2001) was an American professional basketball player. A 6-foot-7-inch (201 cm), 225-pound (102 kg) forward, he was best remembered for playing with the Los Angeles Lakers of the National Basketball Association (NBA), and he also played for the Cincinnati Royals and the Detroit Pistons. Hairston was a member of the NBA champion 1971–72 Lakers; that team won 33 games in a row, a record not duplicated in any other American professional sport.

== Early life and college career ==
Hairston was born in Winston-Salem, North Carolina, and attended Atkins High School in Winston-Salem. He graduated from New York University, where he played college basketball for coach Lou Rossini from 1962 to 1964. One of his teammates at NYU was Barry Kramer; the two smashed almost every record for the NYU Violets. Hairston averaged 21 points per game, set an all-time rebounding record at NYU, and scored 1,350 total points in his college career. He was inducted into the NYU Hall of Fame in 1981.

== Professional career ==
Drafted by the Cincinnati Royals (now the Sacramento Kings), Hairston played professionally for the Cincinnati Royals and Detroit Pistons before joining the Los Angeles Lakers in 1969. In 1971–72, Hairston grabbed 1,045 rebounds; his teammate Wilt Chamberlain pulled down 1,572. Hairston led the Lakers in both rebounds and field goal percentage during the 1973–74 and 1974–75 seasons. He set an NBA record for most defensive rebounds in a quarter with 13 against the Philadelphia 76ers on November 15, 1974. During his 11 seasons in the NBA, Hairston averaged 14.8 points and 10.3 rebounds per game.

== Personal life ==
After retiring from the NBA in 1975, Hairston established the Happy Hairston Youth Foundation in Century City, California. With financial help from celebrities such as Kelsey Grammer, the foundation found bright children from broken homes and paid for their college educations. Hairston also hosted a celebrity golf tournament and had a small role in the 1981 Happy Days episode "Tall Story," where he played the father of an epileptic high school basketball player.

Hairston died in Los Angeles in 2001 from respiratory complications brought on by prostate cancer. He was 58 years of age and was survived by a daughter, Amber, and three sisters.

== Career statistics ==
Legend
GP	Games played	GS	Games started	MPG	Minutes per game
FG%	Field goal percentage	3P%	3-point field goal percentage	FT%	Free throw percentage
RPG	Rebounds per game	APG	Assists per game	SPG	Steals per game
BPG	Blocks per game	PPG	Points per game	**Bold**	Career high
†	Won an NBA championship	*	Led the league

=== NBA ===
==== Regular season ====
Year	Team	GP	MPG	FG%	FT%	RPG	APG	SPG	BPG	PPG
1964–65	Cincinnati	61	12.1	.373	.667	4.8	.4			6.1
1965–66	Cincinnati	72	24.9	.489	.685	7.6	.6			14.1
1966–67	Cincinnati	79	30.9	.479	.660	8.0	.8			14.9
1967–68	Cincinnati	48	33.9	.503	.686	7.4	1.2			17.4
1967–68	Detroit	26	34.3	.459	.717	10.1	1.4			18.8
1968–69	Detroit	**81**	35.7	.469	.731	11.8	1.3			18.1
1969–70	Detroit	15	18.8	**.553**	.714	5.9	.7			10.6
1969–70	L.A. Lakers	55	**39.0**	.490	**.803**	12.5	2.0			**20.6**
1970–71	L.A. Lakers	80	36.5	.466	.782	10.0	2.1			18.6
1971–72†	L.A. Lakers	80	34.4	.461	.779	13.1	2.4			13.1
1972–73	L.A. Lakers	28	33.5	.482	.787	13.2	2.4			16.3
1973–74	L.A. Lakers	77	34.2	.507	.771	**13.5**	**2.7**	**.8**	**.2**	14.5
1974–75	L.A. Lakers	74	30.9	.506	.801	12.8	2.3	.7	.1	10.3
Career		776	31.4	.478	.741	10.3	1.6	.8	.2	14.8

==== Playoffs ====
Year	Team	GP	MPG	FG%	FT%	RPG	APG	SPG	BPG	PPG
1965	Cincinnati	3	13.0	.278	.667	6.7	1.0			4.0
1966	Cincinnati	5	30.0	.403	.711	7.4	.0			15.4
1967	Cincinnati	4	35.0	**.519**	.533	6.8	1.5			16.0
1968	Detroit	6	24.8	.408	.600	6.2	1.2			11.7
1970	L.A. Lakers	**16**	18.5	.435	.686	4.8	1.3			7.4
1971	L.A. Lakers	12	**39.3**	.506	.760	9.1	2.8			**17.0**
1972†	L.A. Lakers	15	38.5	.440	.794	**13.1**	2.1			13.5
1973	L.A. Lakers	3	8.7	.111	.750	1.3	.3			2.7
1974	L.A. Lakers	5	34.4	.417	**.889**	10.4	**3.8**	1.0	.2	9.2
Career		69	29.3	.445	.733	8.1	1.8	1.0	.2	11.6

== Filmography ==
Year	Title	Role	Notes
1972	Columbo : The most crucial game	Himself	
1977	Emergency! : Firehouse Quintet	Referee	
1979	The Concorde ... Airport '79	American Olympic Team Coach	
1994	The Paper	James Hairston	(final film role)
