= 1974–75 Seattle SuperSonics season =

NBA professional basketball team season

- Head coach: Bill Russell
- General manager: Bill Russell
- Owners: Sam Schulman
- Arena: Seattle Center Coliseum

Results
- Record: 43–39 (.524)
- Place: Division: 2nd (Pacific); Conference: 4th (Western)
- Playoff finish: West Semifinals (lost to Warriors 2–4)
- Stats at Basketball Reference

Local media
- Television: KTNT-TV
- Radio: KOMO

The 1974–75 Seattle SuperSonics season was the 8th season of the Seattle SuperSonics in the National Basketball Association (NBA). In their second season with Bill Russell as head coach and with rookies comprising half the roster, the SuperSonics finished the regular season in 4th place in the Western Conference with a 43–39 record and reached the playoffs for the first time in franchise history. After defeating the Detroit Pistons in three games in the first round in a best-of-three series, the team fell to the eventual NBA champions Golden State Warriors in six games.

== Offseason ==
Head coach Bill Russell anticipated a roster overhaul during the offseason. After trading Dick Snyder on draft day to the Cleveland Cavaliers in exchange of the Cavs' first round selection, the SuperSonics selected center Tommy Burleson with the 3rd overall pick.

=== Draft ===
Round	Pick	Player	Position	Nationality	College
1	3	Tom Burleson	C	United States	NC State
2	26	Leonard Gray	F	United States	Long Beach State
3	44	Talvin Skinner	G/F	United States	Maryland Eastern Shore
4	62	William Gordon	G	United States	Maryland Eastern Shore
5	80	Dean Tolson	F	United States	Arkansas
6	98	Wardell Jackson	F	United States	Ohio State
7	116	Jerry Faulkner	G	United States	West Georgia
8	134	Leonard Coulter	F	United States	Morehead State
9	152	Bertram du Pont	G	United States	Dillard
10	169	Rod Derline	G	United States	Seattle

== Roster ==
1974–75 Seattle SuperSonics roster
Players

Pos.	No.	Player	Height	Weight	DOB	From
G/F	40	John Brisker	6 ft 5 in (1.96 m)	210 lb (95 kg)	1947–06–15	Toledo
SG	32	Fred Brown	6 ft 3 in (1.91 m)	182 lb (83 kg)	1948–08–07	Iowa
C	16	Tommy Burleson	7 ft 2 in (2.18 m)	225 lb (102 kg)	1952–02–24	NC State
G	21	Archie Clark	6 ft 2 in (1.88 m)	175 lb (79 kg)	1941–07–15	Minnesota
G	25	Rod Derline	6 ft 0 in (1.83 m)	175 lb (79 kg)	1952–03–11	Seattle
F/C	31	Jim Fox	6 ft 10 in (2.08 m)	230 lb (104 kg)	1943–04–07	South Carolina
F	11	Leonard Gray	6 ft 7 in (2.01 m)	240 lb (109 kg)	1951–12–19	Long Beach State
F/C	24	Spencer Haywood	6 ft 8 in (2.03 m)	225 lb (102 kg)	1949–04–22	Detroit Mercy
F/C	42	John Hummer	6 ft 9 in (2.06 m)	230 lb (104 kg)	1948–05–04	Princeton
F	30	Wardell Jackson	6 ft 6 in (1.98 m)	200 lb (91 kg)	1951–07–18	Ohio State
G/F	22	Talvin Skinner	6 ft 5 in (1.96 m)	195 lb (88 kg)	1952–09–10	Maryland Eastern Shore
F	20	Dean Tolson	6 ft 8 in (2.03 m)	190 lb (86 kg)	1951–11–25	Arkansas
PG	13	Donald Watts	6 ft 1 in (1.85 m)	175 lb (79 kg)	1951–07–22	Xavier (LA)

Coaches
Head coach
- Bill Russell
Assistant(s)
- Bob Hopkins

Legend
- (DP) Unsigned draft pick
- (FA) Free agent
- (S) Suspended
- Injured

Roster

== Standings ==
=== Division ===
Pacific Division	W	L	PCT	GB	Home	Road	Div
y-Golden State Warriors	48	34	.585	–	31–10	17–24	19–11
x-Seattle SuperSonics	43	39	.524	5	24–16	19–23	18–12
Portland Trail Blazers	38	44	.463	10	29–13	9–31	16–14
Phoenix Suns	32	50	.390	16	22–19	10–31	12–18
Los Angeles Lakers	30	52	.366	18	21–20	9–32	10–20

=== Conference ===
#	Western Conference				
#	Team	W	L	PCT	GB
1	z-Golden State Warriors	48	34	.585	–
2	y-Chicago Bulls	47	35	.573	1
3	x-Kansas City–Omaha Kings	44	38	.537	4
4	x-Seattle SuperSonics	43	39	.524	5
5	x-Detroit Pistons	40	42	.488	8
6	Portland Trail Blazers	38	44	.463	10
6	Milwaukee Bucks	38	44	.463	10
8	Phoenix Suns	32	50	.390	16
9	Los Angeles Lakers	30	52	.366	18

z – clinched division title
y – clinched division title
x – clinched playoff spot

== Game log ==
=== Regular season ===
1974–75 game log
Total: 43–39 (home: 24–16; road: 19–23; Neutral: 1–0)
October: 6–2 (home: 4–0; road: 2–2)

Game	Date	Team	Score	High points	High rebounds	High assists	Location Attendance	Record
1	October 17	@ Phoenix	L 97–114	Archie Clark (27)			Arizona Veterans Memorial Coliseum; 7,215	0–1
2	October 18	Detroit	L 95–100	Spencer Haywood (23)			Seattle Center Coliseum; 9,537	0–2
3	October 20	Cleveland	W 100–93	Fred Brown (31)			Seattle Center Coliseum; 10,241	1–2
4	October 23	Portland	W 107–97	Archie Clark (19)			Seattle Center Coliseum; 13,283	2–2
5	October 25	Phoenix	W 106–97	Spencer Haywood (27)			Seattle Center Coliseum; 12,191	3–2
6	October 27	@ Portland	L 94–120	Fred Brown (32)			Memorial Coliseum; 10,870	3–3
7	October 30	Los Angeles	W 117–97	Spencer Haywood (40)			Seattle Center Coliseum; 8,938	4–3

November : 7–10 (home: 3–3; road: 4–7)

Game	Date	Team	Score	High points	High rebounds	High assists	Location Attendance	Record
8	November 1	Golden State	L 88–99	Spencer Haywood (28)			Seattle Center Coliseum; 12,777	4–4
9	November 3	Milwaukee	W 101–89	Fred Brown (28)			Seattle Center Coliseum; 11,839	5–4
10	November 7	@ Golden State	W 104–93	Fred Brown (31)			Oakland–Alameda County Coliseum Arena; 5,391	6–4
11	November 10	Philadelphia	W 109–95	Spencer Haywood (27)			Seattle Center Coliseum; 12,825	7–4
12	November 13	Los Angeles	W 108–103	Spencer Haywood (24)			Seattle Center Coliseum; 13,004	8–4
13	November 15	@ Detroit	L 103–117	Archie Clark (25)			Cobo Arena; 6,789	8–5
14	November 16	@ New York	L 94–104	Spencer Haywood (34)			Madison Square Garden; 18,932	8–6
15	November 19	@ Atlanta	L 113–122	Spencer Haywood (31)			Omni Coliseum; 3,769	8–7
16	November 20	@ New Orleans	W 99–95	Three players (18)			Municipal Auditorium; 4,318	9–7
17	November 22	Chicago	L 89–93	Spencer Haywood (32)			Seattle Center Coliseum; 14,082	9–8
18	November 23	@ Portland	W 117–110	Fred Brown (40)			Memorial Coliseum; 11,825	10–8
19	November 24	Houston	L 109–124	Spencer Haywood (30)			Seattle Center Coliseum; 14,082	10–9
20	November 26	@ Cleveland	L 94–102	Spencer Haywood (29)			Coliseum at Richfield; 4,537	10–10
21	November 27	@ Boston	L 99–104	Fred Brown (29)			Boston Garden; 10,543	10–11
22	November 29	@ Philadelphia	W 121–119 (OT)	Fred Brown (40)			The Spectrum; 8,660	11–11
23	November 30	@ Washington	L 90–122	Archie Clark (23)			Capital Centre; 8,865	11–12

December : 5–7 (home: 2–4; road: 3–3)

Game	Date	Team	Score	High points	High rebounds	High assists	Location Attendance	Record
24	December 2	@ Kansas City–Omaha	W 110–106	Spencer Haywood (26)			Omaha Civic Auditorium; 4,721	12–12
25	December 4	@ Milwaukee	W 112–103	Spencer Haywood (37)			MECCA Arena; 10,497	13–12
26	December 6	New Orleans	W 121–108	James (22)			Seattle Center Coliseum; 14,082	14–12
27	December 7	@ Golden State	L 96–132	Spencer Haywood (20)			Oakland–Alameda County Coliseum Arena; 12,608	14–13
28	December 8	Atlanta	L 95–102	Spencer Haywood (18)			Seattle Center Coliseum; 11,575	14–14
29	December 11	Cleveland	L 95–97	Archie Clark (22)			Seattle Center Coliseum; 10,033	14–15
30	December 13	@ Los Angeles	L 93–109	Fred Brown (16)			The Forum; 10,296	14–16
31	December 17	@ Chicago	L 84–87	Fred Brown (23)			Chicago Stadium; 5,591	14–17
32	December 18	@ Detroit	W 100–97	Fred Brown (34)			Cobo Arena; 4,365	15–17
33	December 22	Detroit	W 108–90	Rowe (22)			Seattle Center Coliseum; 13,346	16–17
34	December 27	Kansas City–Omaha	L 98–108	Fred Brown (37)			Seattle Center Coliseum; 13,260	16–18
35	December 29	Boston	L 101–121	Spencer Haywood (30)			Seattle Center Coliseum; 14,082	16–19

January : 7–7 (home: 3–3; road: 4–4)

Game	Date	Team	Score	High points	High rebounds	High assists	Location Attendance	Record
36	January 1	Washington	W 123–118 (OT)	Spencer Haywood (32)			Seattle Center Coliseum; 12,363	17–19
37	January 3	@ Portland	W 98–93	Fred Brown (32)			Memorial Coliseum; 10,695	18–19
38	January 4	New Orleans	W 111–89	Spencer Haywood (20)			Seattle Center Coliseum; 13,474	19–19
39	January 8	New York	L 102–113	Spencer Haywood (38)			Seattle Center Coliseum; 13,203	19–20
40	January 10	Golden State	L 94–119	Fred Brown (27)			Seattle Center Coliseum; 14,055	19–21
41	January 12	Chicago	L 123–127 (2OT)	Fred Brown, Spencer Haywood (24)			Seattle Center Coliseum; 14,082	19–22
42	January 16	@ Houston	W 127–125 (OT)	Fred Brown (36)			Hofheinz Pavilion; 2,274	20–22
43	January 17	@ New Orleans	L 109–113	Jim Fox (28)			Municipal Auditorium; 3,120	20–23
44	January 19	@ Atlanta	L 109–117	Fred Brown (22)			Omni Coliseum; 5,651	20–24
45	January 21	@ Buffalo	L 108–118	jackson (18)			Buffalo Memorial Auditorium; 10,271	20–25
46	January 24	@ Chicago	L 81–86	Fred Brown (24)			Chicago Stadium; 7,107	20–26
47	January 26	@ Cleveland	W 96–93	Fred Brown, Tommy Burleson (21)			Coliseum at Richfield; 4,219	21–26
48	January 29	@ Phoenix	W 99–85	Fred Brown (24)			Arizona Veterans Memorial Coliseum; 4,273	22–26
49	January 31	Portland	W 106–103	John Brisker (28)			Seattle Center Coliseum; 14,082	23–26

February : 7–8 (home: 4–4; road: 3–4)

Game	Date	Team	Score	High points	High rebounds	High assists	Location Attendance	Record
50	February 1	@ Portland	W 93–91	Fred Brown (28)			Memorial Coliseum; 11,870	24–26
51	February 2	@ Los Angeles	W 119–112	Archie Clark (22)			The Forum; 11,586	25–26
52	February 5	Phoenix	L 102–107	Fred Brown (18)			Seattle Center Coliseum; 10,002	25–27
53	February 6	@ Phoenix	L 105–112	Fred Brown (36)			Arizona Veterans Memorial Coliseum; 5,865	25–28
54	February 7	Washington	L 76–99	Spencer Haywood (22)			Seattle Center Coliseum; 12,720	25–29
55	February 9	Buffalo	L 93–99 (OT)	Spencer Haywood (29)			Seattle Center Coliseum; 11,082	25–30
56	February 12	Houston	W 104–103	Spencer Haywood (31)			Seattle Center Coliseum; 8,595	26–30
57	February 14	@ Portland	L 88–90	Spencer Haywood (23)			Memorial Coliseum; 11,885	26–31
58	February 16	Los Angeles	W 109–87	Spencer Haywood (24)			Seattle Center Coliseum; 12,053	27–31
59	February 19	Boston	W 121–95	Tommy Burleson (28)			Seattle Center Coliseum; 13,680	28–31
60	February 21	Atlanta	W 110–108	Spencer Haywood (39)			Seattle Center Coliseum; 14,082	29–31
61	February 23	Philadelphia	L 100–114	Fred Brown (25)			Seattle Center Coliseum; 12,871	29–32
62	February 25	@ New York	W 102–101	Spencer Haywood (37)			Madison Square Garden; 17,096	30–32
63	February 26	@ Washington	L 98–104	Spencer Haywood (20)			Capital Centre; 6,202	30–33
64	February 28	@ Philadelphia	L 111–112	Spencer Haywood (32)			The Spectrum; 7,682	30–34

March : 9–5 (home: 6–1; road: 3–4)

Game	Date	Team	Score	High points	High rebounds	High assists	Location Attendance	Record
65	March 2	@ Boston	W 104–97	Spencer Haywood (30)			Hartford, CT; 11,283	31–34
66	March 4	@ Buffalo	L 97–104	Leonard Gray (33)			Buffalo Memorial Auditorium; 12,665	31–35
67	March 6	@ Milwaukee	L 92–102	Fred Brown (25)			MECCA Arena; 10,938	31–36
68	March 8	@ Kansas City–Omaha	W 103–99	Fred Brown (24)			Municipal Auditorium; 12,389	32–36
69	March 11	@ Houston	W 122–117 (OT)	Leonard Gray (25)			Hofheinz Pavilion; 6,153	33–36
70	March 14	Buffalo	W 125–105	Tommy Burleson, Spencer Haywood (22)			Seattle Center Coliseum; 14,082	34–36
71	March 15	@ Golden State	L 84–120	Fred Brown (23)			Oakland–Alameda County Coliseum Arena; 9,594	34–37
72	March 16	New York	W 97–94	Fred Brown (37)			Seattle Center Coliseum; 14,082	35–37
73	March 19	Milwaukee	W 101–100	Leonard Gray (20)			Seattle Center Coliseum; 14,082	36–37
74	March 21	@ Los Angeles	L 109–112 (OT)	Archie Clark (29)			The Forum; 10,102	36–38
75	March 23	Phoenix	L 96–102	Spencer Haywood (23)			Seattle Center Coliseum; 14,082	36–39
76	March 26	Los Angeles	W 110–89	Archie Clark (24)			Seattle Center Coliseum; 12,128	37–39
77	March 28	Golden State	W 96–92	Tommy Burleson (22)			Seattle Center Coliseum; 14,082	38–39
78	March 30	Portland	W 98–88	Spencer Haywood (40)			Seattle Center Coliseum; 14,082	39–39

April : 4–0 (home: 2–0; road: 2–0)

Game	Date	Team	Score	High points	High rebounds	High assists	Location Attendance	Record
79	April 2	Kansas City–Omaha	W 99–96	Spencer Haywood (25)			Seattle Center Coliseum; 13,628	40–39
80	April 4	@ Los Angeles	W 111–102	Tommy Burleson (25)			The Forum; 10,946	41–39
81	April 5	@ Golden State	W 109–108	Tommy Burleson (26)			Oakland–Alameda County Coliseum Arena; 11,064	42–39
82	April 6	Phoenix	W 114–111	Archie Clark (31)			Seattle Center Coliseum; 14,082	43–39

1974–75 season schedule

=== Playoffs ===
1975 playoff game log
First Round: 2–1 (home: 2–0; road: 0–1)

Game	Date	Team	Score	High points	High rebounds	High assists	Location Attendance	Series
1	April 8	Detroit	W 90–77	Fred Brown (23)	Spencer Haywood (14)	Slick Watts (6)	Seattle Center Coliseum; 14,082	1–0
2	April 10	@ Detroit	L 106–122	Fred Brown (30)	Tommy Burleson (10)	Slick Watts (8)	Cobo Arena; 10,490	1–1
3	April 12	Detroit	W 100–93	Tommy Burleson (23)	Tommy Burleson (16)	Slick Watts (6)	Seattle Center Coliseum; 14,082	2–1

Conference semifinals: 2–4 (home: 1–2; road: 1–2)

Game	Date	Team	Score	High points	High rebounds	High assists	Location Attendance	Series
1	April 14	@ Golden State	L 96–123	Leonard Gray (20)	Leonard Gray (8)	Watts, Brown (4)	Oakland–Alameda County Coliseum Arena; 12,279	0–1
2	April 16	@ Golden State	W 100–99	Spencer Haywood (28)	Spencer Haywood (15)	Slick Watts (7)	Oakland–Alameda County Coliseum Arena; 12,787	1–1
3	April 17	Golden State	L 96–105	Tommy Burleson (25)	Tommy Burleson (11)	Slick Watts (9)	Seattle Center Coliseum; 14,082	1–2
4	April 19	Golden State	W 111–94	Fred Brown (37)	Tommy Burleson (15)	Slick Watts (10)	Seattle Center Coliseum; 14,082	2–2
5	April 22	@ Golden State	L 100–124	three players tied (15)	Tommy Burleson (8)	Leonard Gray (5)	Oakland–Alameda County Coliseum Arena; 12,787	2–3
6	April 24	Golden State	L 96–105	Slick Watts (24)	Tommy Burleson (11)	Slick Watts (11)	Seattle Center Coliseum; 14,082	2–4

1975 schedule

== Player statistics ==
Legend
GP	Games played	GS	Games started	MPG	Minutes per game
FG%	Field-goal percentage	3P%	3-point field-goal percentage	FT%	Free-throw percentage
RPG	Rebounds per game	APG	Assists per game	SPG	Steals per game
BPG	Blocks per game	PPG	Points per game

=== Season ===
Player	GP	GS	MPG	FG%	3FG%	FT%	RPG	APG	SPG	BPG	PPG
John Brisker	21		13.1	.426		.857	1.6	.9	.3	.1	7.7
Fred Brown	81		33.0	.480		.831	4.2	3.5	2.3	.2	21.0
Tommy Burleson	82		23.0	.417		.687	7.0	1.4	.8	1.9	10.1
Archie Clark	77		32.2	.495		.834	3.1	5.6	1.4	.1	13.9
Rod Derline	58		11.5	.428		.768	1.0	.8	.4	.1	5.6
Jim Fox	75		23.5	.469		.802	6.5	1.8	.6	.2	9.0
Leonard Gray	75		30.4	.489		.722	6.4	2.2	.8	.3	11.5
Spencer Haywood	68		37.2	.459		.811	9.3	2.0	.8	1.6	22.4
John Hummer	43		13.2	.380		.275	2.4	.9	.2	.2	2.2
Wardell Jackson	56		16.8	.397		.718	2.4	.5	.5	.1	4.3
Kennedy McIntosh	6		16.8	.207		.667	2.5	1.2	.7	.5	3.0
Talvin Skinner	73		21.6	.409		.649	4.7	1.2	.7	.2	4.8
Dean Tolson	19		4.6	.432		.647	1.2	.3	.2	.3	2.3
Slick Watts	82		25.1	.421		.608	3.2	6.1	2.3	.1	6.8

=== Playoffs ===
Player	GP	GS	MPG	FG%	3FG%	FT%	RPG	APG	SPG	BPG	PPG
Fred Brown	8		30.0	.496		.844	4.5	2.9	2.1	.1	20.6
Tommy Burleson	9		40.4	.513		.750	10.7	1.4	.8	2.0	20.7
Archie Clark	9		29.9	.436		.900	3.6	3.4	.7	.1	7.0
Rod Derline	6		10.7	.545		.857	2.2	1.2	.3	.0	7.0
Jim Fox	8		5.0	.286		.571	1.1	.3	.0	.1	1.5
Leonard Gray	9		29.2	.488		.846	5.0	2.2	1.3	.6	9.9
Spencer Haywood	9		37.4	.359		.770	9.0	2.0	.8	1.2	15.7
John Hummer	6		11.3	.000			1.5	.7	.3	.0	.0
Talvin Skinner	9		23.4	.467		.737	4.2	1.3	1.0	.2	6.2
Dean Tolson	4		5.5	.125		1.000	1.8	.3	.0	.0	1.0
Slick Watts	9		31.1	.462		.538	3.7	7.1	3.0	.4	11.1

== Awards and records ==
- Spencer Haywood was selected to the All-NBA Second Team and represented the West in the 1975 NBA All-Star Game.
- Tommy Burleson was selected to the NBA All-Rookie First Team.

== Transactions ==
=== Overview ===
Players added

Via draft

- Tommy Burleson
- Rod Derline
- Leonard Gray
- Wardell Jackson
- Talvin Skinner
- Dean Tolson

Via trade

- Archie Clark
Players lost

Via draft
(1974 NBA expansion draft)

- Isaac Stallworth (to New Orleans)

Via trade

- Dick Gibbs
- Dick Snyder

Via free agency

- Milt Williams

Waived

- Kennedy McIntosh

=== Trades ===
May 28, 1974	To Seattle SuperSonics 1974 first round pick	To Cleveland Cavaliers Dick Snyder; 1974 first round pick
August 20, 1974	To Seattle SuperSonics Archie Clark	To Washington Bullets Dick Gibbs; 1975 third round pick
