= 1972 NBA playoffs =

Basketball competition

Tournament details
- Dates: March 28–May 7, 1972
- Season: 1971–72
- Teams: 8

Final positions
- Champions: Los Angeles Lakers (6th title)
- Runners-up: New York Knicks
- Semifinalists: Milwaukee Bucks; Boston Celtics

The 1972 NBA playoffs was the postseason tournament of the National Basketball Association's 1971–72 season. The tournament concluded with the Western Conference champion Los Angeles Lakers defeating the Eastern Conference champion New York Knicks in five games in the NBA Finals. Wilt Chamberlain was named NBA Finals MVP.

The Lakers finished the regular season with the best record in NBA history at 69–13, a mark that was unequalled until the 1996 Bulls finished 72–10. Led by Chamberlain and Jerry West, the Lakers won their first title in Los Angeles and their first title overall since 1954, when the team was based in Minneapolis.

The Lakers won their first NBA Finals in their last nine appearances without superstar Elgin Baylor, who had played in each of the preceding eight losses. He retired nine games into the season because of ongoing knee problems.

The Conference Semifinals series between the Bullets and Knicks would be the last NBA playoff series in which the team with the inferior regular season record held home-court advantage based on division champions holding home-court advantage over a division runner-up through the Conference Finals. Although from 1977–2015, division champions were either automatically seeded higher than non-division champions or guaranteed a minimum seed regardless of record. However, home-court advantage would be based on regular season record, with division champion status being used as a possible tiebreaker to determine seeding.

== Bracket ==
Conference Semifinals
A1	Boston*	4
C2	Atlanta	2
Eastern Conference
C1	Baltimore*	2
A2	New York	4
M1	Milwaukee*	4
P2	Golden State	1
Western Conference
P1	Los Angeles*	4
M2	Chicago	0

Conference Finals
A1	Boston*	1
A2	New York	4
M1	Milwaukee*	2
P1	Los Angeles*	4

NBA Finals
A2	New York	1
P1	Los Angeles*	4

- * Division winner
- Bold Series winner
- Italic Team with home-court advantage

== Conference semifinals ==
=== Eastern Conference semifinals ===
==== (A1) Boston Celtics vs. (C2) Atlanta Hawks ====
March 29

Boxscore

Atlanta Hawks 108, Boston Celtics 126
Scoring by quarter: 30–28, 23–34, 30–33, 25–31
Pts: Lou Hudson 29; Rebs: Don Adams 12; Asts: Herm Gilliam 8	Pts: John Havlicek 32; Rebs: Dave Cowens 16; Asts: John Havlicek 10
Boston leads series, 1–0

Boston Garden, Boston, Massachusetts
Attendance: 12,815

March 31

Boxscore

Boston Celtics 104, Atlanta Hawks 113
Scoring by quarter: 30–32, 22–27, 28–31, 24–23
Pts: John Havlicek 43; Rebs: Dave Cowens 12; Asts: John Havlicek 4	Pts: Lou Hudson 41; Rebs: Walt Bellamy 18; Asts: Herm Gilliam 9
Series tied, 1–1

Alexander Memorial Coliseum, Atlanta, Georgia
Attendance: 6,955

April 2

Boxscore

Atlanta Hawks 113, Boston Celtics 136
Scoring by quarter: 27–33, 26–41, 28–22, 32–40
Pts: Pete Maravich 37; Rebs: Jim Washington 11; Asts: Pete Maravich 6	Pts: John Havlicek 31; Rebs: Cowens, Finkel 11 each Asts: Jo Jo White 11
Boston leads series, 2–1

Boston Garden, Boston, Massachusetts
Attendance: 12,094

April 4

Boxscore

Boston Celtics 110, Atlanta Hawks 112
Scoring by quarter: 30–26, 24–26, 26–32, 30–28
Pts: Jo Jo White 32; Rebs: Steve Kuberski 13; Asts: John Havlicek 5	Pts: Pete Maravich 36; Rebs: Walt Bellamy 15; Asts: Don Adams 4
Series tied, 2–2

Alexander Memorial Coliseum, Atlanta, Georgia
Attendance: 7,192

April 7

Boxscore

Atlanta Hawks 114, Boston Celtics 124
Scoring by quarter: 23–33, 30–25, 31–31, 30–35
Pts: three players 21 each Rebs: Walt Bellamy 13; Asts: Pete Maravich 8	Pts: John Havlicek 27; Rebs: Dave Cowens 12; Asts: John Havlicek 9
Boston leads series, 3–2

Boston Garden, Boston, Massachusetts
Attendance: 15,315

April 9

Boxscore

Boston Celtics 127, Atlanta Hawks 118
Scoring by quarter: 41–31, 35–33, 24–24, 27–30
Pts: Havlicek, Cowens 26 each Rebs: Dave Cowens 20; Asts: Jo Jo White 9	Pts: Pete Maravich 37; Rebs: Walt Bellamy 15; Asts: Pete Maravich 5
Boston wins series, 4–2

Alexander Memorial Coliseum, Atlanta, Georgia
Attendance: 7,192

This was the fifth playoff meeting between these two teams, with the Celtics winning three of the four meetings while the Hawks were based in St. Louis.

Previous playoff series
Boston leads 3–1 in all-time playoff series

1957

Boston Celtics 4, St. Louis Hawks 3

1957 NBA Finals

1958

Boston Celtics 2, St. Louis Hawks 4

1958 NBA Finals

1960

Boston Celtics 4, St. Louis Hawks 3

1960 NBA Finals

1961

Boston Celtics 4, St. Louis Hawks 1

1961 NBA Finals

==== (C1) Baltimore Bullets vs. (A2) New York Knicks ====
March 31

Boxscore

New York Knicks 105, Baltimore Bullets 108 (OT)
Scoring by quarter: 26–24, 24–27, 20–23, 29–25, Overtime: 6–9
Pts: Walt Frazier 31; Rebs: Jerry Lucas 14; Asts: Walt Frazier 6	Pts: Archie Clark 38; Rebs: Wes Unseld 18; Asts: Wes Unseld 6
Baltimore leads series, 1–0

Baltimore Civic Center, Baltimore, Maryland
Attendance: 12,289

April 2

Boxscore

Baltimore Bullets 88, New York Knicks 110
Scoring by quarter: 17–26, 21–30, 28–23, 22–31
Pts: Archie Clark 18; Rebs: Unseld, Tresvant 10 each Asts: Archie Clark 7	Pts: Walt Frazier 30; Rebs: Dave DeBusschere 14; Asts: Walt Frazier 9
Series tied, 1–1

Madison Square Garden, New York City, New York
Attendance: 19,588

April 4

Boxscore

New York Knicks 103, Baltimore Bullets 104
Scoring by quarter: 27–29, 25–18, 26–31, 25–26
Pts: Earl Monroe 28; Rebs: Jerry Lucas 12; Asts: Bill Bradley 5	Pts: Archie Clark 35; Rebs: Unseld, Tresvant 12 each Asts: Unseld, Clark 9 each
Baltimore leads series, 2–1

Baltimore Civic Center, Baltimore, Maryland
Attendance: 12,289

April 6

Boxscore

Baltimore Bullets 98, New York Knicks 104
Scoring by quarter: 20–25, 27–25, 26–32, 25–22
Pts: Archie Clark 22; Rebs: Wes Unseld 16; Asts: Archie Clark 6	Pts: Bill Bradley 25; Rebs: Dave DeBusschere 13; Asts: Walt Frazier 8
Series tied, 2–2

Madison Square Garden, New York City, New York
Attendance: 19,588

April 9

Boxscore

New York Knicks 106, Baltimore Bullets 82
Scoring by quarter: 28–23, 22–20, 27–12, 29–27
Pts: Lucas, Monroe 20 each Rebs: Jerry Lucas 16; Asts: Jerry Lucas 6	Pts: Mike Riordan 16; Rebs: Wes Unseld 13; Asts: Archie Clark 9
New York leads series, 3–2

Baltimore Civic Center, Baltimore, Maryland
Attendance: 10,244

April 11

Boxscore

Baltimore Bullets 101, New York Knicks 107
Scoring by quarter: 19–27, 25–21, 30–27, 27–32
Pts: Archie Clark 31; Rebs: John Tresvant 8 Asts: Archie Clark 11	Pts: Lucas, Frazier 22 each Rebs: Jerry Lucas 12; Asts: Frazier, Monroe 5 each
New York wins series, 4–2

Madison Square Garden, New York City, New York
Attendance: 19,588

This was the fourth playoff meeting between these two teams, with the Knicks winning two of the previous three meetings.

Previous playoff series
New York leads 2–1 in all-time playoff series

1969

Baltimore Bullets 0, New York Knicks 4

1969 Eastern Division Semifinals

1970

Baltimore Bullets 3, New York Knicks 4

1970 Eastern Division Semifinals

1971

Baltimore Bullets 4, New York Knicks 3

1971 Eastern Conference Finals

=== Western Conference semifinals ===
==== (P1) Los Angeles Lakers vs. (M2) Chicago Bulls ====
March 28

Boxscore

Chicago Bulls 80, Los Angeles Lakers 95
Scoring by quarter: 17–17, 23–26, 21–24, 19–28
Pts: Jerry Sloan 18; Rebs: Clifford Ray 17; Asts: Norm Van Lier 4	Pts: Gail Goodrich 32; Rebs: Chamberlain, Hairston 17 each Asts: Jerry West 10
Los Angeles leads series, 1–0

The Forum, Inglewood, California
Attendance: 17,505

March 30

Boxscore

Chicago Bulls 124, Los Angeles Lakers 131
Scoring by quarter: 35–30, 26–38, 31–26, 32–37
Pts: Bob Love 26; Rebs: Clifford Ray 12; Asts: Norm Van Lier 10	Pts: Jerry West 37; Rebs: Wilt Chamberlain 21; Asts: Jerry West 11
Los Angeles leads series, 2–0

The Forum, Inglewood, California
Attendance: 17,505

April 2

Boxscore

Los Angeles Lakers 108, Chicago Bulls 101
Scoring by quarter: 30–24, 26–25, 25–26, 27–26
Pts: Jerry West 31; Rebs: Wilt Chamberlain 14; Asts: Jerry West 9	Pts: Norm Van Lier 22; Rebs: Clifford Ray 20; Asts: Norm Van Lier 8
Los Angeles leads series, 3–0

Chicago Stadium, Chicago, Illinois
Attendance: 17,805

April 4

Boxscore

Los Angeles Lakers 108, Chicago Bulls 97
Scoring by quarter: 18–28, 28–22, 31–25, 31–22
Pts: Gail Goodrich 27; Rebs: Wilt Chamberlain 31; Asts: Jerry West 10	Pts: Clifford Ray 20; Rebs: Clifford Ray 17; Asts: Norm Van Lier 11
Los Angeles wins series, 4–0

Chicago Stadium, Chicago, Illinois
Attendance: 18,847

This was the third playoff meeting between these two teams, with the Lakers winning both prior meetings.

Previous playoff series
Los Angeles leads 2–0 in all-time playoff series

1968

Chicago Bulls 1, Los Angeles Lakers 4

1968 Western Division Semifinals

1971

Chicago Bulls 3, Los Angeles Lakers 4

1971 Western Conference Semifinals

==== (M1) Milwaukee Bucks vs. (P2) Golden State Warriors ====
March 28

Boxscore

Golden State Warriors 117, Milwaukee Bucks 106
Scoring by quarter: 26–36, 33–25, 31–20, 27–25
Pts: Jim Barnett 30; Rebs: Nate Thurmond 20; Asts: Thurmond, Mullins 9 each	Pts: Kareem Abdul-Jabbar 28; Rebs: Kareem Abdul-Jabbar 15; Asts: Lucius Allen 8
Golden State leads series, 1–0

Milwaukee Arena, Milwaukee, Wisconsin
Attendance: 9,877

March 30

Boxscore

Golden State Warriors 93, Milwaukee Bucks 118
Scoring by quarter: 25–33, 22–22, 20–35, 26–28
Pts: Nate Thurmond 32; Rebs: Thurmond, Lee 18 each Asts: Mullins, Barnett 5 each	Pts: Kareem Abdul-Jabbar 25; Rebs: Kareem Abdul-Jabbar 22; Asts: Oscar Robertson 9
Series tied, 1–1

Milwaukee Arena, Milwaukee, Wisconsin
Attendance: 10,746

April 1

Boxscore

Milwaukee Bucks 122, Golden State Warriors 94
Scoring by quarter: 27–18, 31–26, 28–25, 36–25
Pts: Abdul-Jabbar, Dandridge 23 each	Pts: Nate Thurmond 21
Milwaukee leads series, 2–1

Oakland–Alameda County Coliseum Arena, Oakland, California
Attendance: 13,502

April 4

Boxscore

Milwaukee Bucks 106, Golden State Warriors 99
Scoring by quarter: 33–32, 25–19, 23–24, 25–24
Pts: Bob Dandridge 31; Rebs: Kareem Abdul-Jabbar 20; Asts: Oscar Robertson 11	Pts: Jim Barnett 29; Rebs: Clyde Lee 16; Asts: Jeff Mullins 6
Milwaukee leads series, 3–1

Oakland–Alameda County Coliseum Arena, Oakland, California
Attendance: 12,986

April 6

Boxscore

Golden State Warriors 100, Milwaukee Bucks 108
Scoring by quarter: 29–34, 26–19, 27–31, 18–24
Pts: Nate Thurmond 26	Pts: Bob Dandridge 29
Milwaukee wins series, 4–1

Milwaukee Arena, Milwaukee, Wisconsin
Attendance: 10,746

This was the second playoff meeting between these two teams, with the Bucks winning the first meeting.

Previous playoff series
Milwaukee leads 1–0 in all-time playoff series

1971

San Francisco Warriors 1, Milwaukee Bucks 4

1971 Western Conference Semifinals

== Conference finals ==
=== Eastern Conference finals ===
==== (A1) Boston Celtics vs. (A2) New York Knicks ====
April 13

Boxscore

New York Knicks 116, Boston Celtics 94
Scoring by quarter: 26–17, 27–19, 32–31, 31–27
Pts: Walt Frazier 36; Rebs: Jerry Lucas 11; Asts: Jerry Lucas 8	Pts: Jo Jo White 19; Rebs: Dave Cowens 15; Asts: Jo Jo White 5
New York leads series, 1–0

Boston Garden, Boston, Massachusetts
Attendance: 14,292

April 16

Boxscore

Boston Celtics 105, New York Knicks 106
Scoring by quarter: 30–31, 22–24, 24–29, 29–22
Pts: John Havlicek 29; Rebs: Dave Cowens 18; Asts: John Havlicek 6	Pts: Dave DeBusschere 24; Rebs: Dave DeBusschere 17; Asts: three players 4 each
New York leads series, 2–0

Madison Square Garden, New York City, New York
Attendance: 19,588

April 19

Boxscore

New York Knicks 109, Boston Celtics 115
Scoring by quarter: 22–21, 25–34, 36–25, 26–35
Pts: Bill Bradley 29; Rebs: Dave DeBusschere 12; Asts: Dave DeBusschere 6	Pts: Jo Jo White 29; Rebs: Dave Cowens 16; Asts: John Havlicek 11
New York leads series, 2–1

Boston Garden, Boston, Massachusetts
Attendance: 15,315

April 21

Boxscore

Boston Celtics 98, New York Knicks 116
Scoring by quarter: 28–30, 24–27, 21–29, 25–30
Pts: John Havlicek 27; Rebs: Havlicek, Nelson 9 each Asts: John Havlicek 6	Pts: Earl Monroe 26; Rebs: Dave DeBusschere 16; Asts: Jerry Lucas 7
New York leads series, 3–1

Madison Square Garden, New York City, New York
Attendance: 19,588

April 23

Boxscore

New York Knicks 111, Boston Celtics 103
Scoring by quarter: 23–27, 27–28, 33–24, 28–24
Pts: Dave DeBusschere 24; Rebs: Frazier, DeBusschere 11 each Asts: Walt Frazier 7	Pts: John Havlicek 32; Rebs: Dave Cowens 15; Asts: Jo Jo White 9
New York wins series, 4–1

Boston Garden, Boston, Massachusetts
Attendance: 15,315

This was the eighth playoff meeting between these two teams, with the Celtics winning four of the first seven meetings.

Previous playoff series
Boston leads 4–3 in all-time playoff series

1951

Boston Celtics 0, New York Knicks 2

1951 Eastern Division Semifinals

1952

Boston Celtics 1, New York Knicks 2

1952 Eastern Division Semifinals

1953

Boston Celtics 1, New York Knicks 3

1953 Eastern Division Finals

1954

Boston Celtics 2, New York Knicks 0

1954 Eastern Division Round Robin Semifinals

1955

Boston Celtics 2, New York Knicks 1

1955 Eastern Division Semifinals

1967

Boston Celtics 3, New York Knicks 1

1967 Eastern Division Semifinals

1969

Boston Celtics 4, New York Knicks 2

1969 Eastern Division Finals

=== Western Conference finals ===
==== (P1) Los Angeles Lakers vs. (M1) Milwaukee Bucks ====
April 9

Boxscore

Milwaukee Bucks 93, Los Angeles Lakers 72
Scoring by quarter: 19-19, 18–15, 31–8, 25–30
Pts: Kareem Abdul-Jabbar 33; Rebs: Curtis Perry 23; Asts: Oscar Robertson 10	Pts: Happy Hairston 16; Rebs: Wilt Chamberlain 24; Asts: Jerry West 6
Milwaukee leads series, 1–0

The Forum, Inglewood, California
Attendance: 17,505

- Kareem Abdul-Jabbar's famous dunk on Wilt Chamberlain.

April 12

Boxscore

Milwaukee Bucks 134, Los Angeles Lakers 135
Scoring by quarter: 38–37, 28–35, 30–34, 38–29
Pts: Kareem Abdul-Jabbar 40; Rebs: Curtis Perry 12; Asts: Abdul-Jabbar, Robertson 7 each	Pts: Jim McMillian 42; Rebs: Wilt Chamberlain 17; Asts: Jerry West 13
Series tied, 1–1

The Forum, Inglewood, California
Attendance: 17,505

- Jerry West chases down a loose ball deflected off referee Manny Sokol and throws a quick pass to Happy Hairston who scores the game-winning basket with 6 seconds left.

April 14

Boxscore

Los Angeles Lakers 108, Milwaukee Bucks 105
Scoring by quarter: 26–28, 30–22, 26–31, 26–24
Pts: Gail Goodrich 30; Rebs: Wilt Chamberlain 14; Asts: Jerry West 8	Pts: Kareem Abdul-Jabbar 33; Rebs: Kareem Abdul-Jabbar 21; Asts: Abdul-Jabbar, Allen 6 each
Los Angeles leads series, 2–1

Milwaukee Arena, Milwaukee, Wisconsin
Attendance: 10,746

April 16

Boxscore

Los Angeles Lakers 88, Milwaukee Bucks 114
Scoring by quarter: 21–32, 24-24, 20–21, 23–37
Pts: Jerry West 24; Rebs: Chamberlain, Hairston 11 each Asts: Chamberlain, West 4 each	Pts: Kareem Abdul-Jabbar 31; Rebs: Curtis Perry 19; Asts: Oscar Robertson 10
Series tied, 2–2

Milwaukee Arena, Milwaukee, Wisconsin
Attendance: 10,746

April 18

Boxscore

Milwaukee Bucks 90, Los Angeles Lakers 115
Scoring by quarter: 24-24, 22–31, 23–35, 21–25
Pts: Kareem Abdul-Jabbar 28; Rebs: Kareem Abdul-Jabbar 16; Asts: Bob Dandridge 4	Pts: Jim McMillian 25; Rebs: Wilt Chamberlain 26; Asts: Jerry West 10
Los Angeles leads series, 3–2

The Forum, Inglewood, California
Attendance: 17,505

April 22

Boxscore

Los Angeles Lakers 104, Milwaukee Bucks 100
Scoring by quarter: 25-25, 26–27, 21–25, 32–23
Pts: Jerry West 25; Rebs: Wilt Chamberlain 24; Asts: Jerry West 9	Pts: Kareem Abdul-Jabbar 37; Rebs: Kareem Abdul-Jabbar 25; Asts: Kareem Abdul-Jabbar 8
Los Angeles wins series, 4–2

Milwaukee Arena, Milwaukee, Wisconsin
Attendance: 10,746

This was the second playoff meeting between these two teams, with the Bucks winning the first meeting.

Previous playoff series
Milwaukee leads 1–0 in all-time playoff series

1971

Los Angeles Lakers 1, Milwaukee Bucks 4

1971 Western Conference Finals

== NBA Finals: (P1) Los Angeles Lakers vs. (A2) New York Knicks ==
April 26

Boxscore

New York Knicks 114, Los Angeles Lakers 92
Scoring by quarter: 33–28, 34–21, 19–19, 28–24
Pts: Bill Bradley 29; Rebs: Dave DeBusschere 18; Asts: Walt Frazier 11	Pts: Gail Goodrich 20; Rebs: Wilt Chamberlain 19; Asts: Jerry West 7
New York leads series, 1–0

The Forum, Inglewood, California
Attendance: 17,505
Referees: Richie Powers, Ed Rush

April 30

Boxscore

New York Knicks 92, Los Angeles Lakers 106
Scoring by quarter: 26–30, 24–21, 11–28, 31–27
Pts: Walt Frazier 21; Rebs: Lucas, Jackson 11 each Asts: Walt Frazier 7	Pts: Gail Goodrich 31; Rebs: Wilt Chamberlain 24; Asts: Jerry West 13
Series tied, 1–1

The Forum, Inglewood, California
Attendance: 17,505
Referees: Mendy Rudolph, Jack Madden

May 3

Boxscore

Los Angeles Lakers 107, New York Knicks 96
Scoring by quarter: 23–28, 29–19, 28–18, 27–31
Pts: Wilt Chamberlain 26; Rebs: Chamberlain, Hairston 20 each Asts: Jerry West 8	Pts: Walt Frazier 25; Rebs: Jerry Lucas 14; Asts: Jerry Lucas 6
Los Angeles leads series, 2–1

Madison Square Garden, New York City, New York
Attendance: 19,588
Referees: Don Murphy, Richie Powers

May 5

Boxscore

Los Angeles Lakers 116, New York Knicks 111 (OT)
Scoring by quarter: 26–28, 27–28, 25–25, 23–20, Overtime: 15–10
Pts: Jerry West 28; Rebs: Wilt Chamberlain 24; Asts: Jerry West 7	Pts: Bill Bradley 26; Rebs: Dave DeBusschere 13; Asts: Jerry Lucas 11
Los Angeles leads series, 3–1

Madison Square Garden, New York City, New York
Attendance: 19,588
Referees: Mendy Rudolph, Jake O'Donnell

- Walt Frazier tips in a Dave DeBusschere miss over Wilt Chamberlain with 3 seconds left in regulation to force OT.

May 7

Boxscore

New York Knicks 100, Los Angeles Lakers 114
Scoring by quarter: 24–26, 29–27, 25–30, 22–31
Pts: Walt Frazier 31; Rebs: Dave DeBusschere 14; Asts: Walt Frazier 10	Pts: Gail Goodrich 25; Rebs: Wilt Chamberlain 29; Asts: Jerry West 9
Los Angeles wins series, 4–1

The Forum, Inglewood, California
Attendance: 17,505
Referees: Richie Powers, Jack Madden

- The Lakers win their first title after moving to Los Angeles.

This was the fourth playoff meeting between these two teams, with the Lakers winning two of the first three meetings.

Previous playoff series
Los Angeles leads 2–1 in all-time playoff series

1952

Minneapolis Lakers 4, New York Knicks 3

1952 NBA Finals

1953

Minneapolis Lakers 4, New York Knicks 1

1953 NBA Finals

1970

Los Angeles Lakers 3, New York Knicks 4

1970 NBA Finals

== See also ==
- 1972 NBA Finals
- 1971–72 NBA season
- 1971–72 Los Angeles Lakers season
