= Jim Ware (basketball) =

American basketball player

Personal information
- Born: May 2, 1944 Natchez, Mississippi, U.S.
- Died: January 1986 (aged 41)
- Listed height: 6 ft 9 in (2.06 m)
- Listed weight: 210 lb (95 kg)

Career information
- High school: Sadie V. Thompson (Natchez, Mississippi)
- College: Oklahoma City (1963–1966)
- NBA draft: 1966: 3rd round, 26th overall pick
- Drafted by: Cincinnati Royals
- Playing career: 1966–1973
- Position: Power forward
- Number: 18, 27

Career history
- 1966–1967: Cincinnati Royals
- 1967–1968: San Diego Rockets
- 1968: Dallas Chaparrals
- 1968–1969: Scranton Miners
- 1969–1971: Hamden Bics
- 1971–1972: Wilkes-Barre Barons
- 1972–1973: East Orange Colonials

Career highlights
- NCAA rebounding leader (1966)

Career NBA and ABA statistics
- Points: 150 (2.3 ppg)
- Rebounds: 153 (2.4 rpg)
- Assists: 14 (0.2 apg)
- Stats at NBA.com
- Stats at Basketball Reference

James Edward Ware (May 2, 1944 – January 1986) was an American professional basketball player.

Ware was born in Natchez, Mississippi and attended Oklahoma City University, where he was a forward on the basketball team. In 1966, he led the nation in rebounding, with an average of 20.9 per game.

Ware was drafted later that year by the National Basketball Association's Cincinnati Royals. After the 1966–67 season, he was drafted by the San Diego Rockets in the expansion draft. He played just one season for San Diego. Ware was a backup player in the NBA.

== Career statistics ==
Legend
GP	Games played	GS	Games started	MPG	Minutes per game
FG%	Field goal percentage	3P%	3-point field goal percentage	FT%	Free throw percentage
RPG	Rebounds per game	APG	Assists per game	SPG	Steals per game
BPG	Blocks per game	PPG	Points per game	**Bold**	Career high

=== NBA/ABA ===
==== Regular season ====
Year	Team	GP	MPG	FG%	3P%	FT%	RPG	APG	PPG
1966–67	Cincinnati	**33**	6.1	.309		.588	2.1	.2	2.1
1967–68	San Diego	30	7.6	.258		**.676**	2.6	.2	2.4
1968–69	Dallas (ABA)	1	**15.0**	**.750**	–	.500	**7.0**	**1.0**	**7.0**
Career (NBA)		63	6.8	.284		.647	2.3	.4	2.3
Career (overall)		64	6.9	.293	–	.642	2.4	.2	2.3

==== Playoffs ====
Year	Team	GP	MPG	FG%	FT%	RPG	APG	PPG
1967	Cincinnati	3	4.3	.385	–	.7	.0	3.3

== See also ==
- List of NCAA Division I men's basketball season rebounding leaders
