= Gail Goodrich =

American basketball player (born 1943)

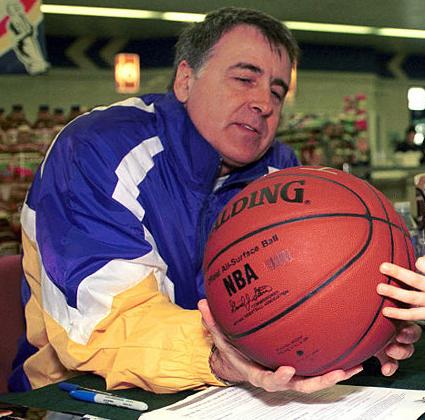
- Goodrich in 2001

Personal information
- Born: April 23, 1943 (age 83) Los Angeles, California, U.S.
- Listed height: 6 ft 1 in (1.85 m)
- Listed weight: 170 lb (77 kg)

Career information
- High school: John H. Francis Polytechnic (Los Angeles, California)
- College: UCLA (1962–1965)
- NBA draft: 1965: territorial pick
- Drafted by: Los Angeles Lakers
- Playing career: 1965–1979
- Position: Shooting guard
- Number: 11, 25

Career history
- 1965–1968: Los Angeles Lakers
- 1968–1970: Phoenix Suns
- 1970–1976: Los Angeles Lakers
- 1976–1979: New Orleans Jazz

Career highlights
- NBA champion (1972); 5× NBA All-Star (1969, 1972–1975); All-NBA First Team (1974); No. 25 retired by Los Angeles Lakers; 2× NCAA champion (1964, 1965); Helms Foundation Player of the Year (1965); Consensus first-team All-American (1965); 2× First-team All-AAWU (1964, 1965); No. 25 retired by UCLA Bruins; California Mr. Basketball (1961)

Career statistics
- Points: 19,181 (18.6 ppg)
- Rebounds: 3,279 (3.2 rpg)
- Assists: 4,805 (4.7 apg)
- Stats at NBA.com
- Stats at Basketball Reference
- Basketball Hall of Fame
- Collegiate Basketball Hall of Fame

Gail Charles Goodrich Jr. (born April 23, 1943) is an American former professional basketball player in the National Basketball Association (NBA). He is best known for scoring a then record 42 points for UCLA in the 1965 NCAA championship game vs. Michigan, and his part in the Los Angeles Lakers' 1971–72 season. During that season the team won a still-record 33 consecutive games, posted what was at the time the best regular season record in NBA history, and also won the franchise's first NBA championship since relocating to Los Angeles. Goodrich was the leading scorer on that team. He is also acclaimed for leading UCLA to its first two national championships under the legendary coach John Wooden, the first in 1963–64 being a perfect 30–0 season when he played with teammate Walt Hazzard. In 1996, 17 years after his retirement from professional basketball, Goodrich was elected to the Naismith Memorial Basketball Hall of Fame. Goodrich is the leader in highest average minutes per game played in Suns franchise history with 39.9.

== Early life ==
A native of the Los Angeles area, Goodrich was the captain of the John H. Francis Polytechnic High School basketball team that dominated and won the 1961 Los Angeles City high school basketball championship. Goodrich scored 29 points in the championship game despite breaking his ankle in the third quarter.

== College career ==
Goodrich has said that he had originally wanted to attend the University of Southern California (USC), where his father had once been a star player. But coach John Wooden of UCLA ultimately showed much more interest in Goodrich than did USC. Like many Division I colleges, USC was wary of Goodrich's short stature. He was only 5 ft 8 in (1.73 m) his junior year in high school and even at his ultimate height of 6 ft 1 in (1.85 m), he was short by college basketball standards.

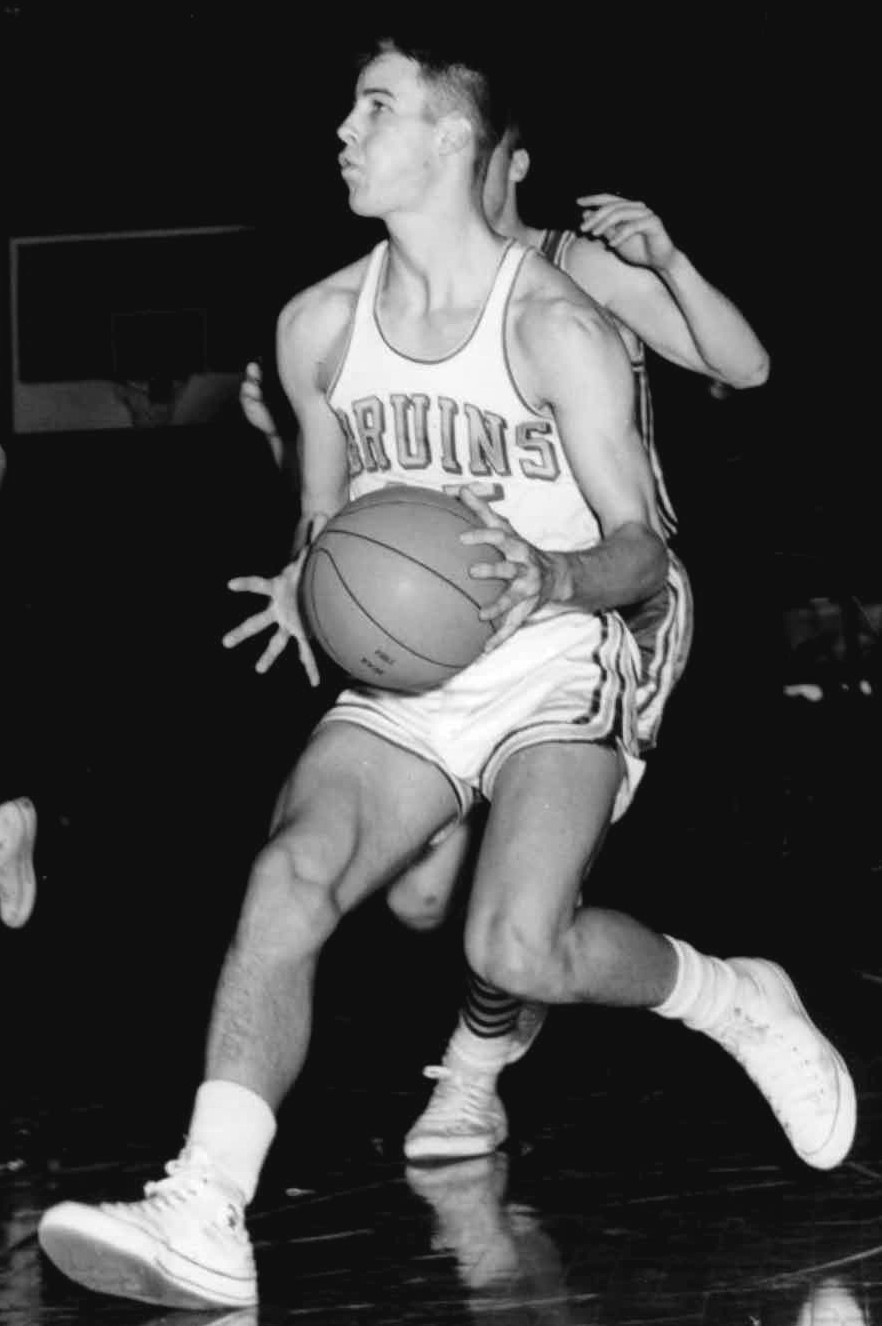
Goodrich in 1964

Goodrich attended UCLA, where he finished as the school's all-time leading scorer and played on the school's first two national championship teams in 1964 and 1965. He was a two-time All-American and the Helms Foundation's "Co-Player of the Year" (along with Princeton's Bill Bradley) in 1965.

In the 1965 NCAA championship game, he scored a record 42 points as UCLA beat favored Michigan. This record stood until 1973 when UCLA's Bill Walton scored 44 in the finals vs. Memphis State, and through 2020 it is still the second-highest total by a player in the championship game. While at UCLA, Goodrich was also a member of the Beta Theta Pi fraternity.

A tenacious and fiery competitor, Goodrich used intelligent ball-handling skills and excellent court vision to lead two of the most successful teams in college basketball history. The left-handed junior guard was the team's main scorer. He finished with an average of 21.5 points per game and guided the 1963–64 UCLA Bruins to a 30–0 record. For the first time, a UCLA team won all 30 of its games en route to the school's first NCAA title. Goodrich and Keith Erickson were the only returning starters from the team that won UCLA's first national title in 1964. As a senior, the Bruins repeated as NCAA champions as Goodrich scored 24.6 points per game. At UCLA, Goodrich helped compile a 78–11 three-year record. In both of those championship seasons, Goodrich was named to the NCAA Final Four All-Tournament team. Goodrich at the time finished as UCLA's all-time leading scorer (1,690 points) which is now broken by Don MacLean (2,608 points).

== Professional career ==
=== Los Angeles Lakers (1965–1968) ===
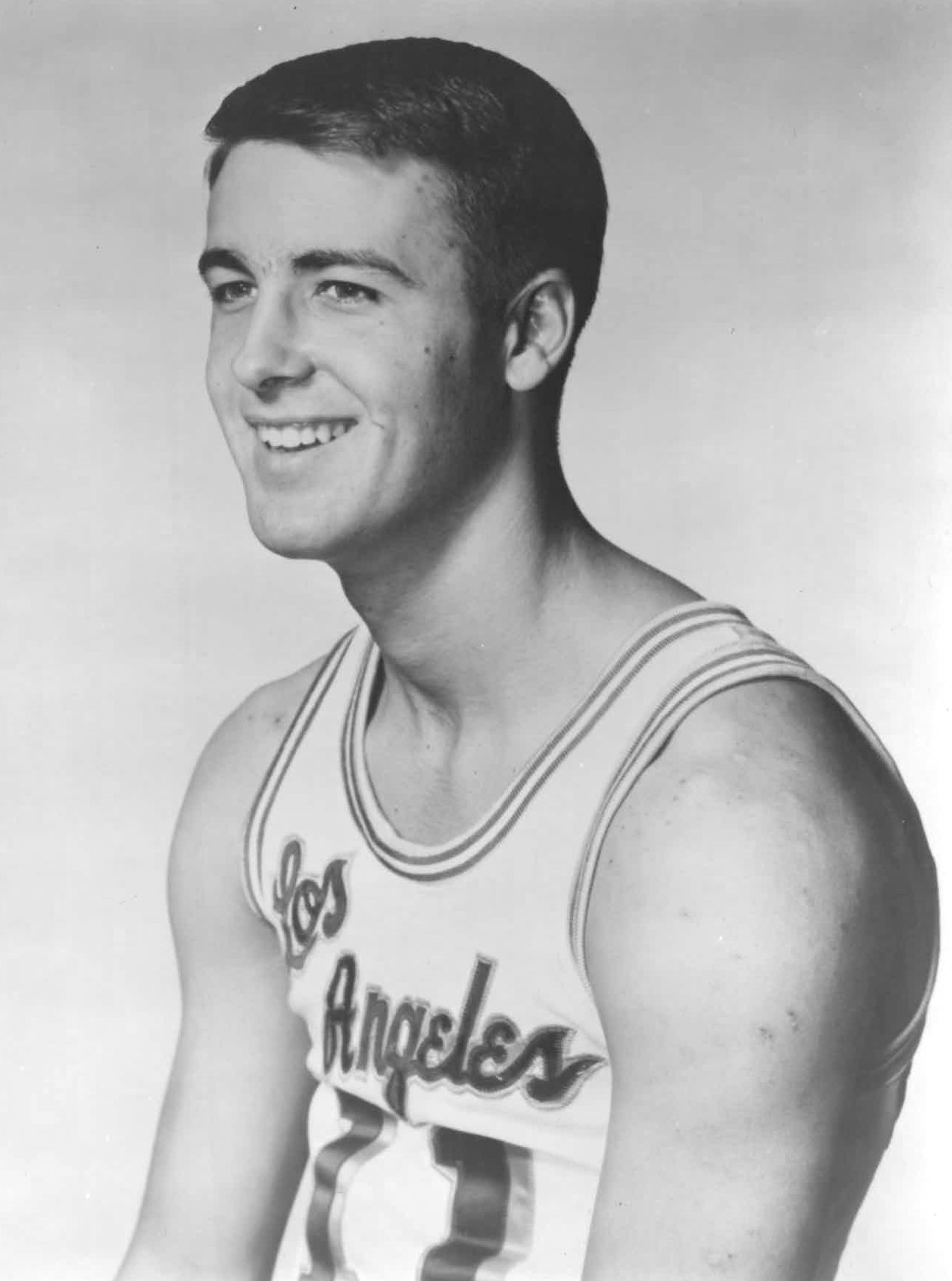
Goodrich during his first stint with the Los Angeles Lakers

Although many believed Goodrich was too small for the college game and too frail for the pros, Goodrich, through perseverance and discipline, proved his doubters wrong. Goodrich was nicknamed "Stumpy", a moniker bestowed upon him by teammate Elgin Baylor, because of Goodrich's height and short legs.

Goodrich was a territorial pick by the Los Angeles Lakers in the 1965 NBA draft. As a rookie in 1965–66, he averaged about 15 minutes per game as a reserve guard behind starters Jerry West and former UCLA teammate Walt Hazzard (later known as Mahdi Abdul-Rahman). Goodrich posted averages of 7.8 points per game (ppg), 2.0 rebounds per game (rpg) and 1.6 assists per game (apg). On December 23, 1965, he scored a personal single-game best of 25 points against the San Francisco Warriors. The Lakers advanced to the NBA finals, where they lost in seven games to the Boston Celtics.

In 1966–67, his playing time increased to over 23 minutes per game as he divided time with Hazzard at guard opposite West. Goodrich posted averages of 12.4 ppg, 3.3 rpg and 2.7 apg. In the first game of the season he scored a then-career-high 30 points in a game against the Baltimore Bullets, a feat which he duplicated six weeks later against the Chicago Bulls.

In 1967–68, his third season, Goodrich's playing time increased again, to 26 minutes per game, although it wasn't without frustration as he returned to a reserve role backing up guard Archie Clark opposite West. Goodrich averaged 13.8 ppg, 2.5 rpg and 2.6 apg. The Lakers returned to the NBA Finals, but they again fell to the Celtics in six games.

=== Phoenix Suns (1968–1970) ===
In 1968, the Lakers lost Goodrich to the Phoenix Suns in the expansion draft, and he quickly became the star of the new franchise and a favorite among Suns fans. A full-time starter for the first time in his NBA career in the 1968–69 season, Goodrich showed what was to come as he scored at least 22 points in each of the Suns' first 11 games. In a span of nearly three weeks (February 21-March 9, 1969), he had three 40-point games, which saw him peak with 47 against the San Diego Rockets on March 9.

For the season, Goodrich scored 23.8 points per game — sixth in the league and tops on his team. He surprised critics who had labeled him a gunner by ranking seventh in assists with 6.4 per game along with 5.4 rpg. He was selected to play in the 1969 NBA All-Star Game. In the following season, Goodrich averaged 20 points and 7.5 assists per game. After the season, on May 20, 1970, he was traded back to the Lakers in exchange for Mel Counts.

=== Return to Los Angeles (1970–1976) ===
For the 1970–71 season, now as a Lakers starter alongside Jerry West, Goodrich averaged 17.5 ppg as the Lakers advanced to the Western Conference Finals.

The 1971–72 Lakers season was one that would go down in history, with Goodrich a major factor. Goodrich, playing all 82 games, averaged a career-high 25.9 ppg, including 28 games of 30 points or more, to go with 3.6 rpg and 4.5 apg. The Lakers posted an NBA-record 33 consecutive wins en route to an NBA-best 69–13 record led by Goodrich and fellow future Hall-of-Famers Jerry West, and Wilt Chamberlain. Elgin Baylor retired early in the season as the Lakers ripped off an NBA record 33 game winning streak. The Lakers advanced to the NBA Finals, where they dismantled the New York Knicks in five games to win the NBA championship as Goodrich averaged a series-leading 25.6 ppg.

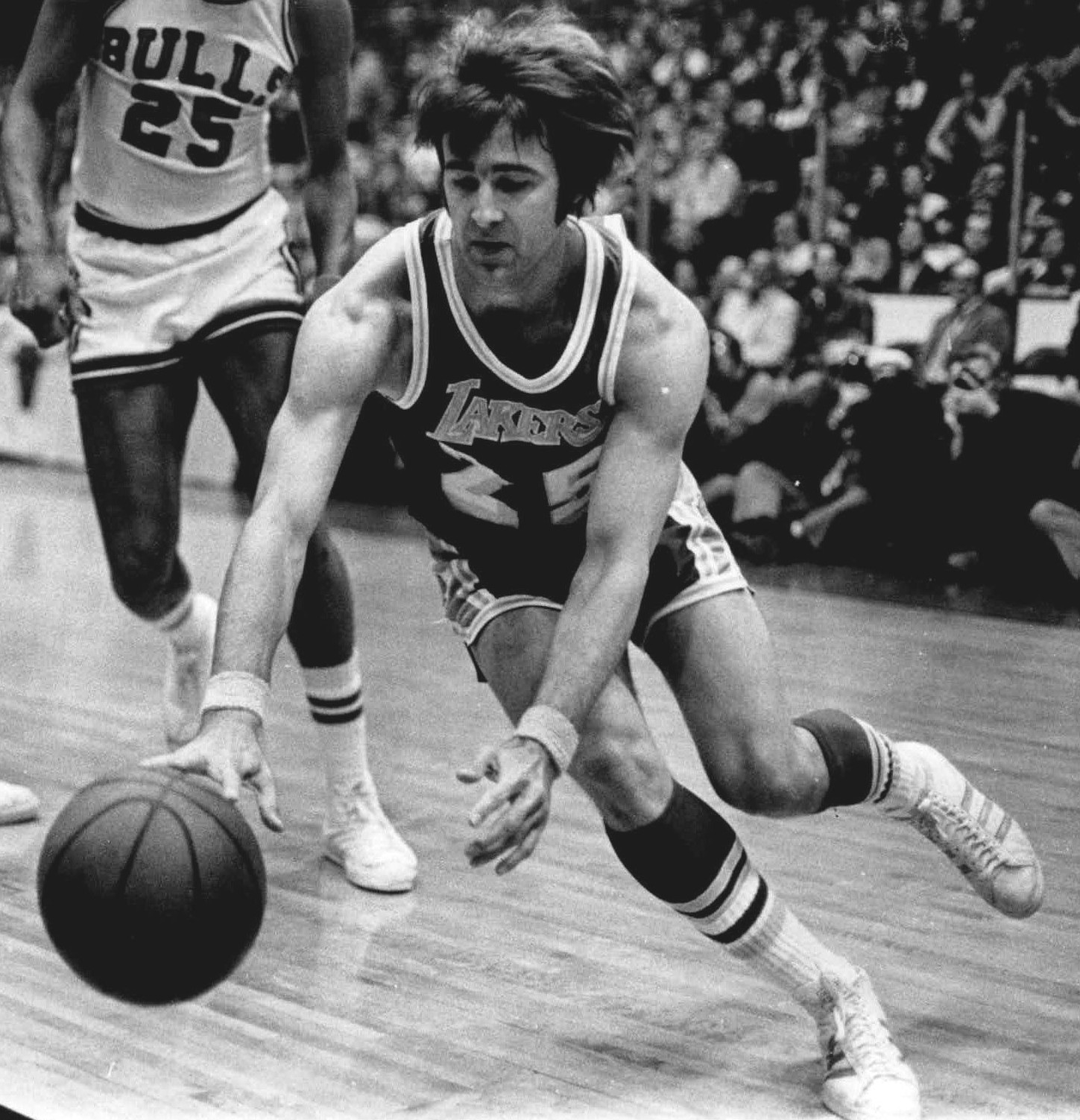
Goodrich with the Los Angeles Lakers in 1973

Goodrich led the Lakers in scoring in 1971–72, 1972–73, 1973–74, and 1974–75. From the 1968–69 season through the 1975–76 season, Goodrich scored an average of 22.4 points a game, among the best in the NBA during that period, while also averaging over five assists per game.

The 1973–74 season was the best all-around season in his career. He was first-team All-NBA and again an all-star. He scored over 2,000 points and averaged 25.3 points a game — fourth in the league in scoring — while leading the NBA in free throws made and free throw attempts as he drove the basket perhaps more than at any point in his career. On October 28, 1973, he fired in a career-high 49 points against the Portland Trail Blazers. In 1973–74, he was in the second year of earning $180,000 per season.

Goodrich, then 31, dropped about 10 pounds (4.5 kg) for the 1974–75 season stating, "I decided prior to this season that I would lose about 10 pounds to get down to my college playing weight of 172 ... I'm sure it helps with my quickness and my stamina." Goodrich led the Lakers in scoring with a 22.6 per game average. On March 28, 1975, for the first time in his career, Goodrich topped 50 points in a game with 53 against the Kansas City-Omaha Kings.

Goodrich held out in the fall of 1975 and missed the first four games while playing out his option to become a free agent the following season. In the 1975–76 season, Goodrich switched roles, becoming the "playmaking" guard rather than the "shooting guard", switching spots with Lucius Allen. Goodrich had played a similar role in Phoenix, but during his time with Jerry West, Goodrich was the shooting guard. Ironically, Allen was the shooting guard when he played with Oscar Robertson on the champion Milwaukee Bucks team. So, both were familiar with the roles. According to a Long Beach newspaper, the switch worked and "did wonders for a slumping Laker team". That same season the Lakers had acquired Kareem Abdul-Jabbar to upgrade the center position from previous center Elmore Smith.

=== New Orleans Jazz (1976–1979) ===
On August 6, 1976, Goodrich signed a three-year contract, reportedly worth $1.4 million, with the New Orleans Jazz, where he teamed in the backcourt with Pete Maravich. Early in the 1976–77 season, Goodrich sustained an Achilles heel injury that required surgery. In January 1977, Goodrich filed a lawsuit against the Lakers, alleging that he was shorted over $150,000 of his $275,000 1975–76 season salary due to fines for missing training camp and for pre-season and some regular season games. The lawsuit also asked for $75,000 punitive damages, stating that the fines were a "breach of contract". He rehabilitated the leg and prepared hard for the 1977–78 season and it seemingly paid off as he averaged 16.1 points a game and shot a career-best .495 from the field as a 34-year-old guard.

He played one final campaign in 1978–79, the 14th of his career. After averaging 12.7 ppg in 74 games, Goodrich retired, having scored 19,181 career points.

His impact upon the Lakers franchise extended far beyond his playing years. When he signed with the Jazz in 1976, per league rules at the time, the Lakers were to receive compensation for losing a veteran free agent. The Lakers and Jazz agreed to send New Orleans' regular first-round pick from the 1979 draft to Los Angeles (along with first-round picks in 1977 and 1978 and an additional second-round pick). When the Jazz finished the 1978–79 season with the worst record in the NBA, the Lakers were eligible for one of the top two picks of that draft. Until 1985, the two teams with the worst records flipped a coin to determine which team would receive the top pick. The Lakers won the coin flip against the Chicago Bulls, who selected David Greenwood second. The Lakers selected Magic Johnson. They used the first-round pick in 1977 for Kenny Carr and they traded the 1978 first round selection to Boston, who took Freeman Williams.

== Legacy ==
For his career, Goodrich was a five-time All-Star and was All-NBA in 1973–74. He ranks as fifth all-time in points scored among left-handed shooters in NBA history. At the time of his retirement in 1979, Goodrich was 11th all-time in scoring and 10th all-time in assists in NBA history.

Goodrich ranks among all-time Lakers leaders in several categories, including total points (sixth, 13,044), assists (seventh, 2,863), free throws made (seventh, 2,830) and games played (ninth, 687).

In February 1996, Goodrich was announced for induction into the Naismith Memorial Basketball Hall of Fame. On November 20, 1996, the Lakers retired his #25 jersey, with then-Laker star Eddie Jones changing his jersey number from 25 to 6. In 2003, Poly High held a ceremony to retire his #12. On December 18, 2004, UCLA retired his #25.

== Personal life ==
After his basketball career, Goodrich and his second wife, Toni, eventually settled in Greenwich, Connecticut. He has three children from his first marriage—a son and twin daughters. Goodrich became an executive with a golf course management company, American Golf Corporation in Santa Monica, California. In 1996, he left American Golf and became the president of National Fairways, a golf company in Greenwich. In his tenure at National Fairways, Goodrich purchased Forsgate Country Club in New Jersey in partnership with another golf firm, RDC Golf. He sold his interest in Forsgate in 1999 and retired from the golf industry. Goodrich serves as a studio analyst for NBA TV.

== NBA career statistics ==
Legend
GP	Games played	GS	Games started	MPG	Minutes per game
FG%	Field goal percentage	3P%	3-point field goal percentage	FT%	Free throw percentage
RPG	Rebounds per game	APG	Assists per game	SPG	Steals per game
BPG	Blocks per game	PPG	Points per game	**Bold**	Career high
†	Won an NBA championship

=== Regular season ===
Year	Team	GP	GS	MPG	FG%	3P%	FT%	RPG	APG	SPG	BPG	PPG
1965–66	L.A. Lakers	65	–	15.5	.404	–	.691	2.0	1.6	–	–	7.8
1966–67	L.A. Lakers	77	–	23.1	.454	–	.751	3.3	2.7	–	–	12.4
1967–68	L.A. Lakers	79	–	26.0	.486	–	.770	2.5	2.6	–	–	13.8
1968–69	Phoenix	81	–	**40.0**	.411	–	.747	**5.4**	6.4	–	–	23.8
1969–70	Phoenix	81	–	39.9	.454	–	.808	4.2	**7.5**	–	–	20.0
1970–71	L.A. Lakers	79	–	35.5	.475	–	.770	3.3	4.8	–	–	17.5
1971–72†	L.A. Lakers	**82**	–	37.1	.487	–	.850	3.6	4.5	–	–	**25.9**
1972–73	L.A. Lakers	76	–	35.5	.464	–	.840	3.5	4.4	–	–	23.9
1973–74	L.A. Lakers	**82**	–	37.3	.442	–	**.864**	3.0	5.2	1.5	0.1	25.3
1974–75	L.A. Lakers	72	–	37.1	.459	–	.841	3.0	5.8	1.4	0.1	22.6
1975–76	L.A. Lakers	75	–	35.3	.441	–	.847	2.9	5.6	**1.6**	0.2	19.5
1976–77	New Orleans	27	–	22.6	.446	–	.800	2.3	2.7	0.8	0.1	12.6
1977–78	New Orleans	81	–	31.5	**.495**	–	.795	2.2	4.8	1.0	**0.3**	16.1
1978–79	New Orleans	74	–	28.8	.449	–	.853	2.5	4.8	1.2	0.2	12.7
Career		1,031	–	32.5	.456	–	.807	3.2	4.7	1.3	0.2	18.6
All-Star		5	3	15.4	.421	–	.500	1.8	2.8	0.2	0.0	6.6

=== Playoffs ===
Year	Team	GP	GS	MPG	FG%	3P%	FT%	RPG	APG	SPG	BPG	PPG
1966	L.A. Lakers	11	–	26.4	.467	–	.674	3.8	3.0	–	–	10.5
1967	L.A. Lakers	3	–	27.0	.355	–	.611	3.0	3.3	–	–	11.0
1968	L.A. Lakers	10	–	10.0	**.489**	–	.778	1.4	1.4	–	–	6.0
1970	Phoenix	7	–	37.9	.475	–	.857	**4.6**	5.4	–	–	20.3
1971	L.A. Lakers	12	–	**43.2**	.425	–	.841	3.2	**7.6**	–	–	**25.4**
1972†	L.A. Lakers	15	–	38.3	.445	–	**.898**	2.5	3.3	–	–	23.8
1973	L.A. Lakers	**17**	–	35.5	.448	–	.785	3.6	3.9	–	–	20.0
1974	L.A. Lakers	5	–	37.8	.389	–	.848	3.2	6.0	**1.4**	**0.2**	19.6
Career		80	–	32.8	.442	–	.819	3.1	4.2	1.4	0.2	18.1

== See also ==
- List of NBA single-game steals leaders
