= Dan Anderson (basketball, born 1951) =

American basketball player (born 1951)

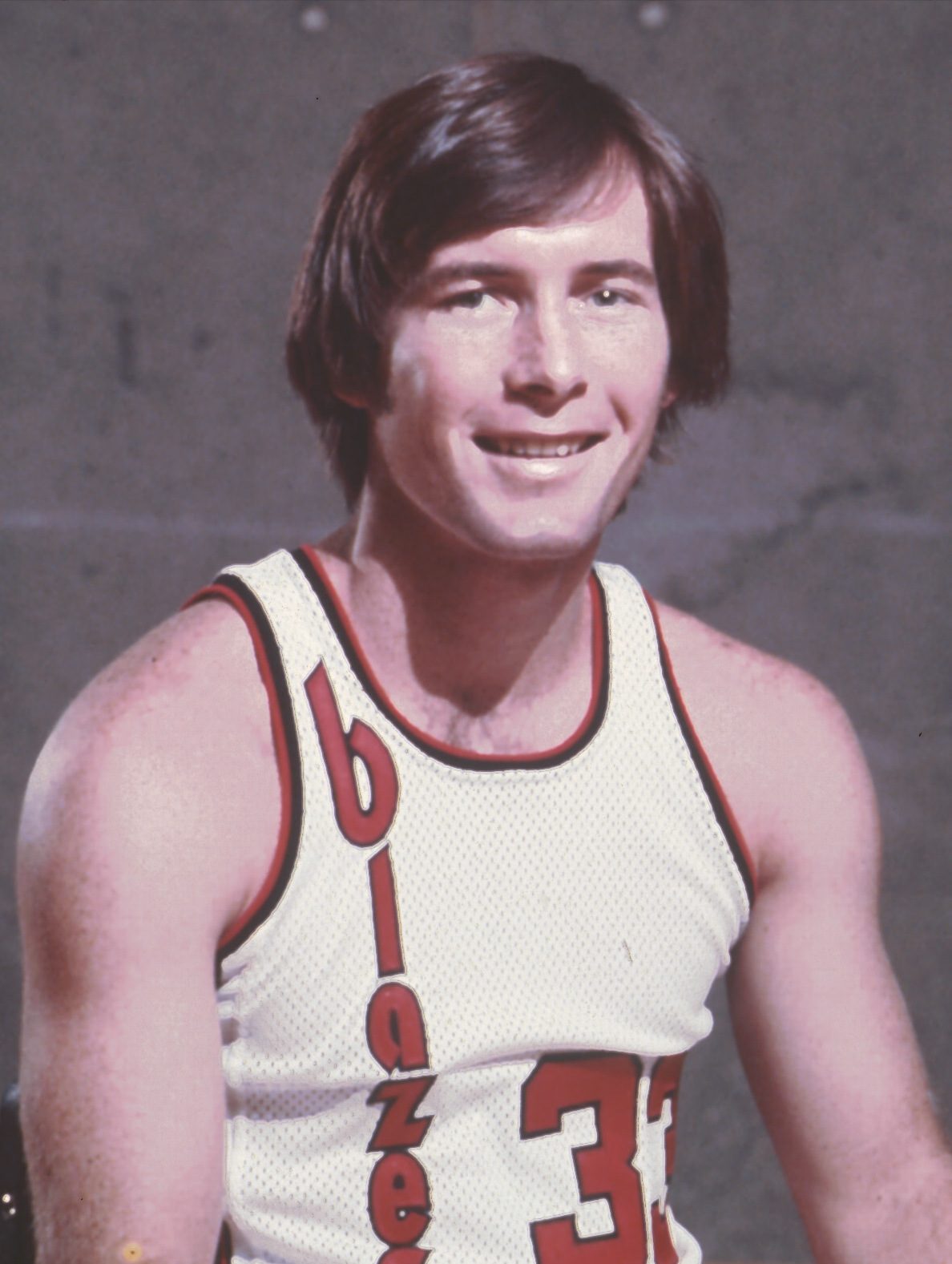

Personal information
- Born: January 1, 1951 (age 75) Torrance, California, U.S.
- Listed height: 6 ft 2 in (1.88 m)
- Listed weight: 185 lb (84 kg)

Career information
- High school: North Torrance (Torrance, California)
- College: USC (1971–1974)
- NBA draft: 1974: 6th round, 92nd overall pick
- Drafted by: Portland Trail Blazers
- Playing career: 1974–1976
- Position: Point guard
- Number: 33

Career history
- 1974–1976: Portland Trail Blazers

Career highlights
- First-team All-Pac-8 (1974); Second-team All-Pac-8 (1973)

Career NBA statistics
- Points: 347 (3.7 ppg)
- Rebounds: 91 (1.0 rpg)
- Assists: 166 (1.7 apg)
- Stats at NBA.com
- Stats at Basketball Reference

Daniel Edward Anderson (born January 1, 1951) is an American former professional basketball player in the National Basketball Association (NBA).

Anderson was selected with the 2nd pick of the sixth round of the 1974 NBA draft by the Portland Trail Blazers. His brief NBA career spanned from 1974 to 1976 with the Blazers, averaging 3.7 points in 95 total games. He was also selected in the 8th round of the 1974 ABA Draft by the San Diego Conquistadors.

== Personal life ==
When he retired from the NBA, Anderson became a house builder and a woodworker.

== Career statistics ==
Legend
GP	Games played	GS	Games started	MPG	Minutes per game
FG%	Field goal percentage	3P%	3-point field goal percentage	FT%	Free throw percentage
RPG	Rebounds per game	APG	Assists per game	SPG	Steals per game
BPG	Blocks per game	PPG	Points per game	**Bold**	Career high

=== NBA ===
==== Regular season ====
Year	Team	GP	MPG	FG%	FT%	RPG	APG	SPG	BPG	PPG
1974–75	Portland	43	10.5	.448	**.867**	.7	**1.9**	**.4**	.0	2.8
1975–76	Portland	**52**	**11.8**	**.486**	.836	**1.2**	1.6	**.4**	.0	**4.6**
Career		95	11.2	.472	.846	1.0	1.7	.4	.0	3.7
