= Wardell Jackson =

American basketball player (born 1951)

Personal information
- Born: July 18, 1951 (age 75) Yazoo City, Mississippi
- Listed height: 6 ft 7 in (2.01 m)
- Listed weight: 200 lb (91 kg)

Career information
- High school: Macomber (Toledo, Ohio)
- College: Ohio State (1971–1974)
- NBA draft: 1974: 6th round, 68th overall pick
- Drafted by: Seattle SuperSonics
- Position: Small forward
- Number: 30

Career history
- 1974–1975: Seattle SuperSonics
- Stats at NBA.com
- Stats at Basketball Reference

Wardell Jackson (born July 18, 1951) is an American former professional basketball small forward who played one season in the National Basketball Association (NBA) as a member of the Seattle SuperSonics during the 1974–75 season. Born in Yazoo City, Mississippi, Jackson attended Ohio State University where he was drafted by the Sonics during the sixth round of the 1974 NBA draft.

== Career statistics ==
Legend
| GP | Games played | GS | Games started | MPG | Minutes per game |
| FG% | Field goal percentage | 3P% | 3-point field goal percentage | FT% | Free throw percentage |
| RPG | Rebounds per game | APG | Assists per game | SPG | Steals per game |
| BPG | Blocks per game | PPG | Points per game | **Bold** | Career high |

=== NBA ===
==== Regular season ====
| Year | Team | GP | MPG | FG% | FT% | RPG | APG | SPG | BPG | PPG |
|---|---|---|---|---|---|---|---|---|---|---|
| 1974–75 | Seattle | 56 | 16.8 | .397 | .718 | 2.4 | .5 | .5 | .1 | 4.3 |
