= 1974–75 Portland Trail Blazers season =

NBA professional basketball team season

- Head coach: Lenny Wilkens
- General manager: Harry Glickman
- Owners: Herman Sarkowsky; Larry Weinberg
- Arena: Memorial Coliseum

Results
- Record: 38–44 (.463)
- Place: Division: 3rd (Pacific); Conference: 6th (Western)
- Playoff finish: Did not qualify
- Stats at Basketball Reference

Local media
- Television: KOIN
- Radio: KOIN

The 1974–75 Portland Trail Blazers season was the fifth season of the Portland Trail Blazers in the National Basketball Association (NBA). After a 27–55 record the previous season, the Blazers earned the #1 pick in the 1974 NBA draft, and made perhaps the most important selection in franchise history: Hall of Famer Bill Walton out of UCLA.

In three years of varsity competition, Walton led UCLA to two NCAA championships and 88 consecutive wins, smashing the 60-game streak set by Bill Russell's teams at the University of San Francisco. Walton also set UCLA's career assists record, which left observers declaring him the best passing center in the history of the game.

Injuries would limit Walton to just 35 games in his rookie year, but nevertheless the Blazers challenged for a playoff spot for the first time in franchise history. The Blazers fell just two games short with a 38–44 record.

== Offseason ==
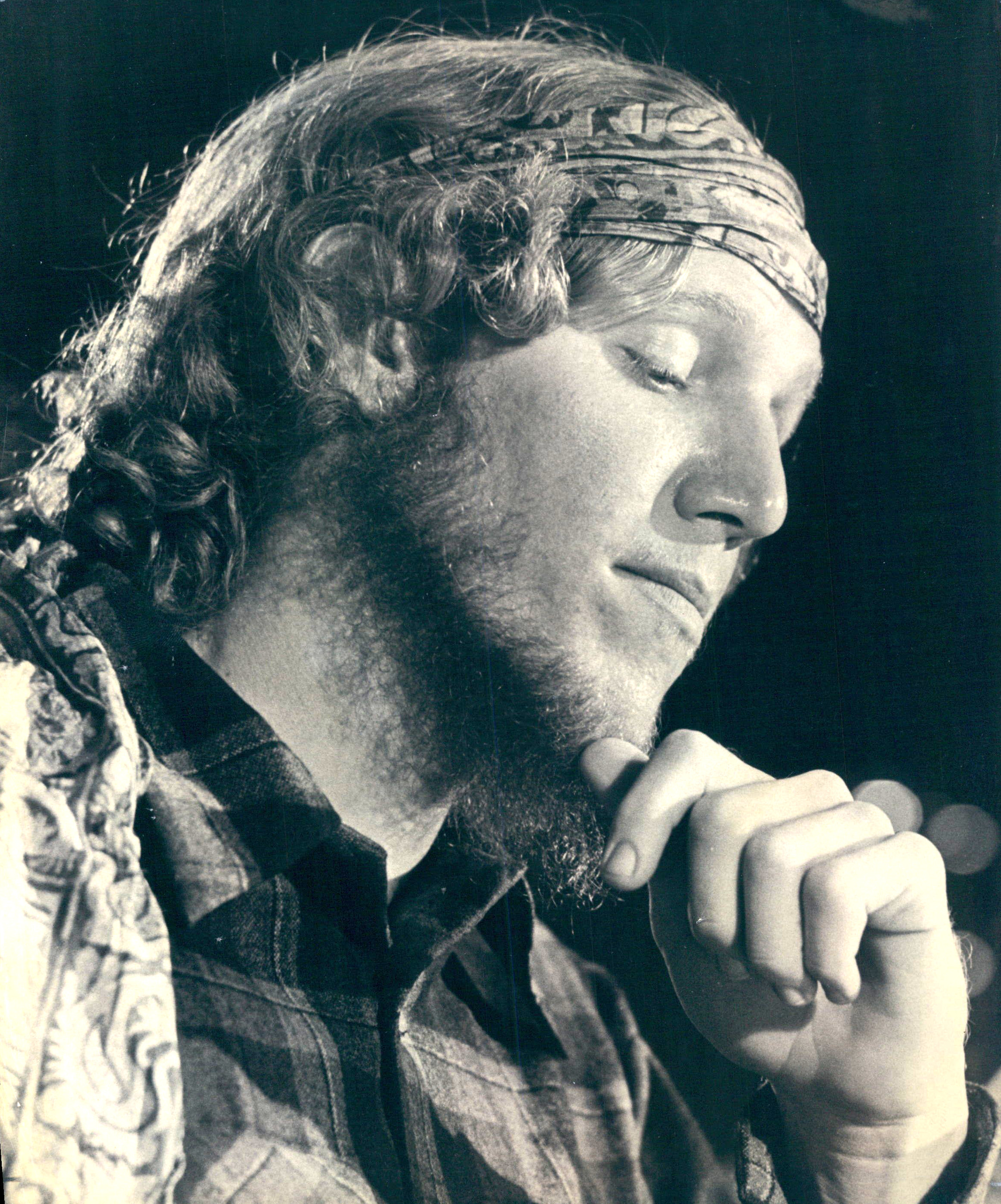
The Trail Blazers selected Bill Walton first overall in the 1974 NBA draft.

=== NBA draft ===
Note: This is not a complete list; only the first two rounds are covered, as well as any other picks by the franchise who played at least one NBA game.

Round	Pick	Player	Position	Nationality	School/Club team
1	1	Bill Walton	C	United States	UCLA
2	20	Jan van Breda Kolff	G/F	United States	Vanderbilt
2	34	Phil Lumpkin	G	United States	Miami (OH)
2	36	Rubin Collins	G	United States	Maryland-Eastern Shore
4	56	Mickey Johnson	F	United States	Aurora
6	92	Daniel Anderson	G	United States	USC

== Roster ==
Portland Trail Blazers roster
Players

Pos.	No.	Player	Height	Weight	DOB	From
G	33	Dan Anderson	6 ft 2 in (1.88 m)	185 lb (84 kg)	1951-01-01	USC
F	40	Barry Clemens	6 ft 6 in (1.98 m)	210 lb (95 kg)	1943-05-01	Ohio Wesleyan
SF	27	John Johnson	6 ft 7 in (2.01 m)	200 lb (91 kg)	1947-10-18	Iowa
PG	10	Phil Lumpkin	6 ft 0 in (1.83 m)	165 lb (75 kg)	1951-12-20	Miami (OH)
C	25	LaRue Martin	6 ft 11 in (2.11 m)	208 lb (94 kg)	1950-03-30	Loyola Chicago
PF	36	Lloyd Neal	6 ft 7 in (2.01 m)	225 lb (102 kg)	1950-10-10	Tennessee State
SG	45	Geoff Petrie	6 ft 4 in (1.93 m)	190 lb (86 kg)	1949-05-05	Princeton
SF	4	Greg Smith	6 ft 5 in (1.96 m)	195 lb (88 kg)	1947-01-28	Western Kentucky
F	15	Larry Steele	6 ft 5 in (1.96 m)	180 lb (82 kg)	1949-05-05	Kentucky
C	32	Bill Walton	6 ft 11 in (2.11 m)	210 lb (95 kg)	1952-11-05	UCLA
PF	21	Sidney Wicks	6 ft 8 in (2.03 m)	225 lb (102 kg)	1949-09-19	UCLA
PG	19	Lenny Wilkens	6 ft 1 in (1.85 m)	180 lb (82 kg)	1937-10-28	Providence

Coaches
Head coach
- Lenny Wilkens

Legend
- (DP) Unsigned draft pick
- (FA) Free agent
- (S) Suspended
- Injured

== Regular season ==
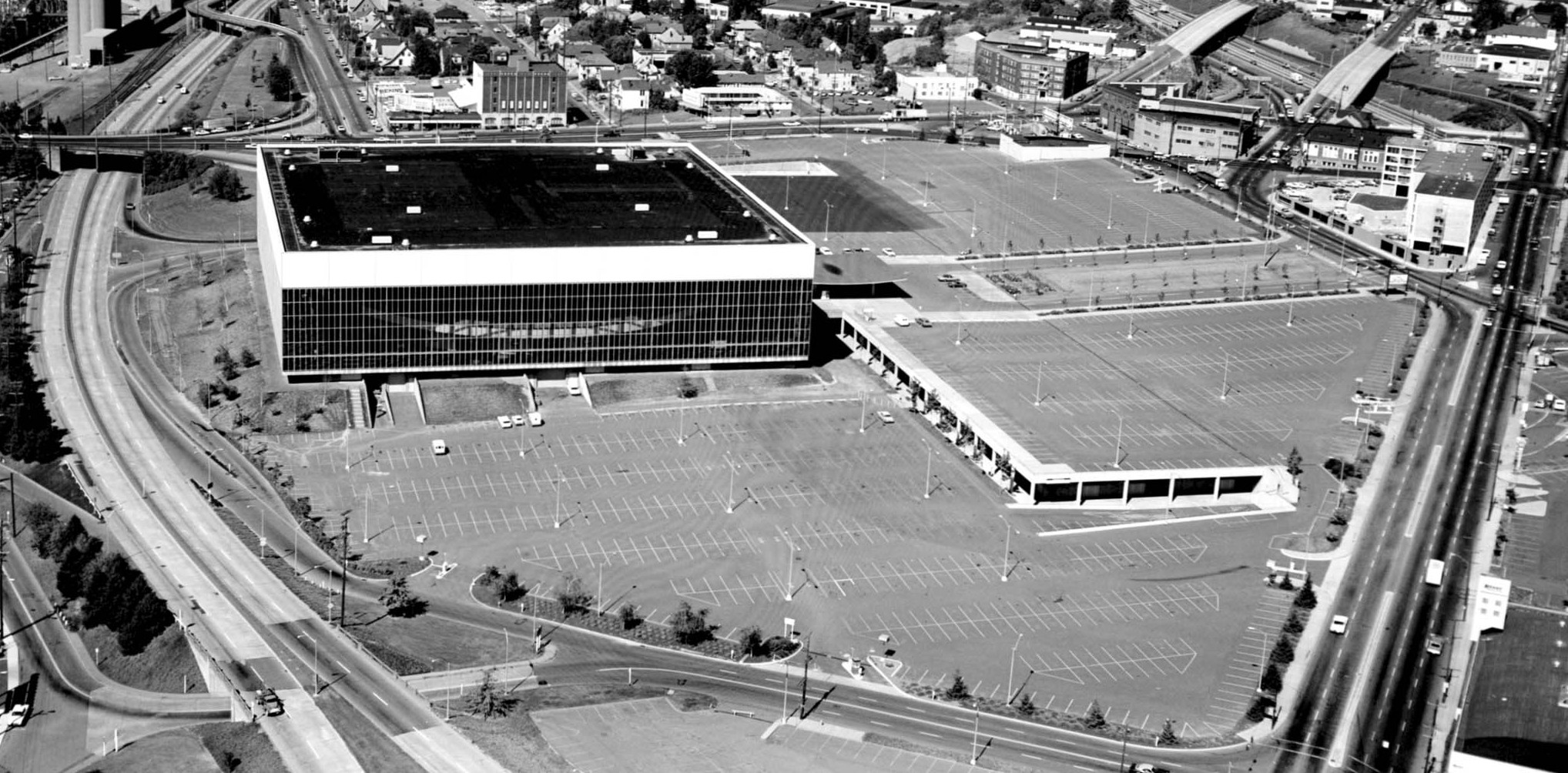
The Trail Blazers played their home games at Memorial Coliseum.

=== Season standings ===
Pacific Division	W	L	PCT	GB	Home	Road	Div
y-Golden State Warriors	48	34	.585	–	31–10	17–24	19–11
x-Seattle SuperSonics	43	39	.524	5	24–16	19–23	18–12
Portland Trail Blazers	38	44	.463	10	29–13	9–31	16–14
Phoenix Suns	32	50	.390	16	22–19	10–31	12–18
Los Angeles Lakers	30	52	.366	18	21–20	9–32	10–20

#	Western Conference				
#	Team	W	L	PCT	GB
1	z-Golden State Warriors	48	34	.585	–
2	y-Chicago Bulls	47	35	.573	1
3	x-Kansas City–Omaha Kings	44	38	.537	4
4	x-Seattle SuperSonics	43	39	.524	5
5	x-Detroit Pistons	40	42	.488	8
6	Portland Trail Blazers	38	44	.463	10
6	Milwaukee Bucks	38	44	.463	10
8	Phoenix Suns	32	50	.390	16
9	Los Angeles Lakers	30	52	.366	18

z – clinched division title
y – clinched division title
x – clinched playoff spot

== Awards and honors ==
- Sidney Wicks, NBA All-Star
