= Leonard Gray =

American basketball player (1951–2006)

Personal information
- Born: December 19, 1951 Kansas City, Kansas, U. S.
- Died: June 13, 2006 (aged 54) Browns Mills, New Jersey, U. S.
- Listed height: 6 ft 8 in (2.03 m)
- Listed weight: 240 lb (109 kg)

Career information
- High school: Sumner (Kansas City, Kansas)
- College: Long Beach State (1971–1974)
- NBA draft: 1974: 2nd round, 26th overall pick
- Drafted by: Seattle SuperSonics
- Playing career: 1974–1977
- Position: Power forward
- Number: 11, 12

Career history
- 1974–1976: Seattle SuperSonics
- 1976–1977: Washington Bullets

Career highlights
- PCAA Player of the Year (1974); First-team All-PCAA (1974)

Career NBA statistics
- Points: 2,408 (10.8 ppg)
- Rebounds: 1,169 (5.2 rpg)
- Assists: 490 (2.2 apg)
- Stats at NBA.com
- Stats at Basketball Reference

Leonard Earl Gray (December 19, 1951 – June 13, 2006) was an American professional basketball player who played three seasons in the National Basketball Association (NBA).

== Early life ==
Gray was born at the University of Kansas Medical Center in Kansas City, Kansas and raised in Kansas City, Kansas. Because of his stature, Gray was affectionately referred to in his hometown as "Hugie".

== High school career ==
Gray attended Sumner High School where he played basketball all four years and football through his junior year. During Gray’s junior football season, he broke his leg and chose not to return for his senior football season.

During his senior year at Sumner, Gray led the Spartans to an undefeated season and the 1969 Kansas Class 4 state basketball championship. In the state title game against McPherson High School, Gray totaled 24 points and 22 rebounds. Gray’s high school coach Roy Flook told the Kansas City Star that college coaches told him that “Leonard is the top prospect in the country”.

In a ceremony at Sumner High School on May 6, 1969, Gray signed a letter of intent with the University of Kansas. Gray chose Kansas over offers from over 100 college programs including UCLA, Harvard, Yale, and Big 8 Conference and Big Ten Conference universities.

== College career ==
Gray enrolled at the University of Kansas for the 1969–1970 school year.

Due to NCAA freshman eligibility rules in effect at that time, Gray was limited to competing for the Jayhawks 1969–1970 freshman basketball team. Gray averaged 17.5 points per game for the 1969–1970 Jayhawk freshmen squad.

On October 15, 1970, weeks before what would have been Gray’s sophomore season at Kansas, Kansas coach Ted Owens announced Gray had left the Jayhawk basketball program and would transfer to another school. Ironically, that season Kansas advanced to the 1971 Final 4, but the subsequent two seasons ended in sub-.500 records.

Gray transferred from Kansas to the Long Beach State basketball program coached by Jerry Tarkanian.

Gray didn't become eligible for competition for Long Beach State until February 1, 1972, which was midway through the 1971–1972 season. In his opening game for the 49ers, Gray scored 16 points in a victory over Cal-Irvine. In March 1972, the 49ers season ended in a loss to Bill Walton’s UCLA Bruins in the 1972 NCAA West Regional Final by the score of 73–57.

In the 1972–1973 season, Gray set a single-season Long Beach State record with a 56.5% shooting percentage and added 7.1 rebounds per game for the season. The 49ers finished the season with a 26–3 record and a loss to the USF Dons in the 1973 NCAA West Regional semifinals.

After the 1972–1973 season, Gray was drafted with the 45th overall pick in the 3rd round of the 1973 NBA draft by the Atlanta Hawks but declined the professional opportunity and returned to Long Beach State. Gray also was drafted by the Utah Stars in the 1973 ABA Draft.

During the 1973–1974 season, Long Beach State, now coached by future Hall of Famer Lute Olson who replaced the departed Jerry Tarkanian, was one of the nation’s top teams. The 49er roster consisted of five future NBA draft choices (Cliff Pondexter, Roscoe Pondexter, Glenn McDonald, Bob Gross and Gray) and finished with a 24–2 record and an Associated Press Final Ranking of 10th. However, the 49ers were placed on NCAA probation for recruiting violations in January 1974 and were declared ineligible for the 1974 NCAA basketball tournament.

In 1974, Gray earned first team All-PCAA and PCAA Player of the Year.

Gray finished his career at Long Beach State averaging 10.7 points and 7.2 rebounds per game.

Following his senior year at Long Beach State, Gray was drafted by the Seattle SuperSonics with the 26th overall pick in the second round of the 1974 NBA draft.

== Professional career ==
Gray signed a multi-year contract with the Seattle SuperSonics on June 26, 1974. He played his first two full seasons (1974–1975 and 1975–1976) and part of a third (1976–1977) with the SuperSonics for head coach Bill Russell.

In March 1976, Gray, who by then was a SuperSonics co-captain in just his second NBA season, suffered a season-ending knee injury that resulted in surgery.

On December 13, 1976, Seattle traded Gray to the Washington Bullets for Nick Weatherspoon.

After completing the 1976–1977 season with the Bullets, the team didn't offer him a contract for the 1977–1978 season.

Gray played in an NBA playoff series with both the Supersonics (lost in Western Conference semifinals) in 1975 and Bullets (lost in Eastern Conference semifinals) in 1977.

Gray finished his NBA career playing in 224 games over three seasons averaging 10.8 points and 5.2 rebounds per game.

== Honors ==
In June 1969, Gray was named as one of the Top 100 High School basketball players in the United States for the 1968–1969 season by “Coach and Athlete” magazine.

Despite never playing football in college, Gray was drafted by the San Francisco 49ers as a Tight End in the 15th round of the 1974 NFL draft.

Gray was inducted into the Long Beach State University Athletics Hall of Fame in 1995.

== Personal life ==
Leonard was the son of Paralee and Leonard Gray Sr. He had two sons.

Gray is also the uncle of twin sister former professional basketball players Courtney Paris and Ashley Paris. The Paris twins led Oklahoma Sooners women's basketball to the 2009 NCAA Women’s Final 4. Gray’s sister Lynne is the mother of the Paris sisters.

A resident of Las Vegas, Gray died in Browns Mills, New Jersey on June 13, 2006.

== Career statistics ==
Legend
GP	Games played	GS	Games started	MPG	Minutes per game
FG%	Field goal percentage	3P%	3-point field goal percentage	FT%	Free throw percentage
RPG	Rebounds per game	APG	Assists per game	SPG	Steals per game
BPG	Blocks per game	PPG	Points per game	**Bold**	Career high

=== NBA ===
==== Regular season ====
Year	Team	GP	MPG	FG%	FT%	RPG	APG	SPG	BPG	PPG
1974–75	Seattle	**75**	30.4	**.489**	.722	**6.4**	2.2	.8	.3	11.5
1975–76	Seattle	66	**32.4**	.474	.746	6.0	**3.1**	**1.1**	**.5**	**13.8**
1976–77	Seattle	25	25.7	.435	**.756**	4.3	2.2	**1.1**	**.5**	11.5
1976–77	Washington	58	17.2	.436	.738	3.2	1.2	.5	.3	6.0
Career		224	27.0	.469	.739	5.2	2.2	.9	.4	10.8

==== Playoffs ====
Year	Team	GP	MPG	FG%	FT%	RPG	APG	SPG	BPG	PPG
1975	Seattle	**9**	**29.2**	**.488**	**.846**	**5.0**	**2.2**	**1.3**	**.6**	**9.9**
1977	Washington	8	6.5	.286	–	1.1	.1	.3	.0	1.5
Career		17	18.5	.446	.846	3.2	1.2	.8	.3	5.9
