= Talvin Skinner =

American basketball player (born 1952)

Personal information
- Born: September 10, 1952 (age 74) Berlin, Maryland, U.S.
- Listed height: 6 ft 5 in (1.96 m)
- Listed weight: 210 lb (95 kg)

Career information
- High school: Worcester (Newark, Maryland)
- College: Maryland Eastern Shore (1971–1974)
- NBA draft: 1974: 3rd round, 44th overall pick
- Drafted by: Seattle SuperSonics
- Playing career: 1974–1976
- Position: Small forward
- Number: 22

Career history
- 1974–1976: Seattle SuperSonics

Career highlights
- 2× First-team All-MEAC (1973, 1974)
- Stats at NBA.com
- Stats at Basketball Reference

Talvin "Tab" Skinner (born September 10, 1952) is an American former professional basketball player.

== Playing career ==
=== College ===
Skinner played college basketball for the Maryland Eastern Shore Hawks. In the 1972–73 season at UMES, Skinner led all players in the NAIA Championships in rebounding.

For his play during the 1973-74 Mid-Eastern Athletic Conference men's basketball tournament, Skinner was named the Most Outstanding Player.

In the 1973–74 season, Skinner and the Fighting Hawks became the first ever Historically Black College or University (HBCU) to earn an invitation to the National Invitation Tournament (NIT) post-season basketball tournament.

=== Professional ===
Skinner was drafted by the Seattle SuperSonics in the 1974 NBA Draft (8th pick of the 3rd round). He played with the SuperSonics for two seasons, starting part of the 1975–76 season and playing in the first two post-seasons for the franchise.

== Later years ==
Following his playing career, Skinner worked at Boeing in Seattle, Washington. He afterward worked as a player development aide with the Seattle Storm.

== Career statistics ==
Legend
GP	Games played	GS	Games started	MPG	Minutes per game
FG%	Field goal percentage	3P%	3-point field goal percentage	FT%	Free throw percentage
RPG	Rebounds per game	APG	Assists per game	SPG	Steals per game
BPG	Blocks per game	PPG	Points per game	**Bold**	Career high

=== NBA ===
==== Regular season ====
Year	Team	GP	MPG	FG%	FT%	RPG	APG	SPG	BPG	PPG
1974–75	Seattle	**73**	**21.6**	.409	**.649**	**4.7**	**1.2**	**.7**	**.2**	**4.8**
1975–76	Seattle	72	17.0	**.463**	.613	3.7	.9	**.7**	.1	4.3
Career		145	19.3	.434	.633	4.2	1.0	.7	.2	4.6

==== Playoffs ====
Year	Team	GP	MPG	FG%	FT%	RPG	APG	SPG	BPG	PPG
1975	Seattle	**9**	**23.4**	**.467**	**.737**	**4.2**	**1.3**	**1.0**	.2	**6.2**
1976	Seattle	6	14.3	.286	.733	2.5	1.2	.8	**.3**	3.2
Career		15	19.8	.424	.735	3.5	1.3	.9	.3	5.0
