= 1966–67 Cincinnati Royals season =

NBA professional basketball team season

- Head coach: Jack McMahon
- Owners: Louis Jacobs
- Arena: Cincinnati Gardens

Results
- Record: 39–42 (.481)
- Place: Division: 3rd (Eastern)
- Playoff finish: Division semifinals (lost to 76ers 1–3)
- Stats at Basketball Reference

Local media
- Television: WKRC-TV
- Radio: WLW

The 1966–67 season was the 22nd overall, tenth for the Royals in Cincinnati and was marred by precipitous drops in performance and home attendance, a combination that did much to shape the future of the franchise. The Royals finished the regular season with a 39-42 record, six games worse than the 1965-66 campaign. Attendance fell to an average of 4,755 per game at Cincinnati Gardens, a 25 percent decline from the most recent season.

The Royals opened the campaign in the glare of a disappointing loss to the Boston Celtics in the 1966 playoffs. First Team All-Pros Jerry Lucas and Oscar Robertson remained the core of the team, but long-time fixtures Jack Twyman and Wayne Embry announced their retirements, dissatisfied with their roles in the previous season. Veteran Tom Hawkins also left the club to rejoin the Los Angeles Lakers in the off-season.

Local college star Connie Dierking was promoted to starting center with promising rookie Walt Wesley as his backup. Happy Hairston and rookie Bob Love split minutes at forward next to Lucas, while holdover Adrian Smith and rookie Flynn Robinson held down the spot opposite Robertson in the backcourt. The end result was a more athletic but also far younger, less experienced group, one that had little hope of competing against the playoff-savvy Celtics and Philadelphia 76ers in the Eastern Division. True to the pre-season consensus, the Royals were never a factor in the playoff race and finished a distant third.

The off-court activities by Robertson and Lucas affected their performances on the court and served as no small distractions for the team as a whole. As the head of the NBA Players Union, Robertson led the fight for the advancement of rights on a number of issues. Meanwhile, he posted another All-Star-caliber season as the most dominant guard in the game. Lucas was involved in several off-court business ventures, including his own fast-food chain, Jerry Lucas Beef-N-Shakes. A spate of injuries did him no favors, especially at the offensive end, where he was noticeably less active, although he remained one of the best rebounders in the league. The twosome continued to play considerable minutes for a club that suffered from a shortage of established options.

Art Modell, head of the NFL Cleveland Browns, agreed to sponsor nine home games at the Cleveland Arena over the course of the season. The Cleveland crowds were consistently among the largest the Royals were cheered by that season.

The Royals made the playoffs for their last time while based in Cincinnati. They drew 68–13 record-setting Philadelphia as their opponent. With a victory on their own court in Game One, the Royals were then routed over the remaining games of the series to conclude their transitional season.

== Roster ==
1966–67 Cincinnati Royals roster
Players

Pos.	No.	Player	Height	Weight	DOB	From
C	17	Len Chappell	6 ft 8 in (2.03 m)	240 lb (109 kg)	1941–01–31	Wake Forest
C	24	Connie Dierking	6 ft 9 in (2.06 m)	222 lb (101 kg)	1936–10–02	Cincinnati
SF	22	Happy Hairston	6 ft 7 in (2.01 m)	225 lb (102 kg)	1942–05–31	NYU
PG	19	Freddie Lewis	6 ft 0 in (1.83 m)	175 lb (79 kg)	1943–07–01	Arizona State
PF	21	Bob Love	6 ft 8 in (2.03 m)	215 lb (98 kg)	1942–12–08	Southern
PF	16	Jerry Lucas	6 ft 8 in (2.03 m)	230 lb (104 kg)	1940–03–30	Ohio State
SF	11	Jon McGlocklin	6 ft 5 in (1.96 m)	205 lb (93 kg)	1943–06–10	Indiana
PG	14	Oscar Robertson	6 ft 5 in (1.96 m)	205 lb (93 kg)	1938–11–24	Cincinnati
PG	20	Flynn Robinson	6 ft 1 in (1.85 m)	185 lb (84 kg)	1941–04–28	Wyoming
SG	10	Adrian Smith	6 ft 1 in (1.85 m)	180 lb (82 kg)	1936–10–05	Kentucky
PF	18	Jim Ware	6 ft 7 in (2.01 m)	210 lb (95 kg)	1944–05–02	Oklahoma City
C	13	Walt Wesley	6 ft 11 in (2.11 m)	220 lb (100 kg)	1945–01–25	Kansas
C	17	George Wilson	6 ft 8 in (2.03 m)	225 lb (102 kg)	1942–05–09	Cincinnati

Coaches
Head coach
- Jack McMahon

Legend
- (DP) Unsigned draft pick
- (FA) Free agent
- (S) Suspended
- Injured

Roster

== Regular season ==
=== Season standings ===
Eastern Division	W	L	PCT	GB	Home	Road	Neutral	Div
x-Philadelphia 76ers	68	13	.840	–	28–2	26–8	14–3	28–8
x-Boston Celtics	60	21	.741	8	27–4	25–11	8–6	30–6
x-Cincinnati Royals	39	42	.481	29	20–11	12–24	7–7	14–22
x-New York Knicks	36	45	.444	32	20–15	9–24	7–6	11–25
Baltimore Bullets	20	61	.247	48	12–20	3–30	5–11	7–29

=== Game log ===
1966–67 game log
#	Date	Opponent	Score	High points	Record
1	October 15	Detroit	99–103	Oscar Robertson (37)	1–0
2	October 18	@ Detroit	112–114	Oscar Robertson (28)	1–1
3	October 22	@ St. Louis	123–133 (OT)	Oscar Robertson (30)	1–2
4	October 26	@ Baltimore	116–122	Oscar Robertson (37)	1–3
5	October 27	St. Louis	118–121	Oscar Robertson (22)	2–3
6	October 29	San Francisco	127–115	Adrian Smith (27)	2–4
7	November 2	New York	129–131	Jerry Lucas (35)	3–4
8	November 4	@ Detroit	120–115	Oscar Robertson (36)	4–4
9	November 5	Chicago	113–99	Oscar Robertson (33)	4–5
10	November 10	Boston	113–112 (OT)	Oscar Robertson (48)	4–6
11	November 11	@ Baltimore	119–104	Oscar Robertson (39)	5–6
12	November 12	Philadelphia	112–98	Oscar Robertson (22)	5–7
13	November 16	N Los Angeles	124–112	Hairston, Robertson (24)	5–8
14	November 19	@ Philadelphia	110–134	Oscar Robertson (25)	5–9
15	November 20	Baltimore	123–125	Oscar Robertson (40)	6–9
16	November 22	@ New York	121–118	Oscar Robertson (34)	7–9
17	November 23	Philadelphia	106–111	Oscar Robertson (28)	8–9
18	November 25	N New York	109–115	Oscar Robertson (27)	9–9
19	November 26	@ Boston	87–118	Adrian Smith (15)	9–10
20	November 30	New York	119–115	Oscar Robertson (26)	9–11
21	December 3	Los Angeles	130–118	Adrian Smith (28)	9–12
22	December 7	@ Boston	91–119	Flynn Robinson (22)	9–13
23	December 9	Boston	117–99	Oscar Robertson (22)	9–14
24	December 10	@ San Francisco	120–123 (OT)	Dierking, Love (26)	9–15
25	December 11	@ Los Angeles	118–119	Oscar Robertson (33)	9–16
26	December 13	@ San Francisco	126–112	Oscar Robertson (36)	10–16
27	December 14	@ Los Angeles	126–124	Jerry Lucas (29)	11–16
28	December 16	N Chicago	120–128	Oscar Robertson (23)	11–17
29	December 18	Baltimore	114–138	Happy Hairston (30)	12–17
30	December 25	San Francisco	124–112	Oscar Robertson (38)	12–18
31	December 26	@ Philadelphia	118–134	Hairston, Robertson (24)	12–19
32	December 27	Detroit	123–131	Oscar Robertson (33)	13–19
33	December 29	Los Angeles	125–114	Oscar Robertson (30)	13–20
34	December 30	N San Francisco	107–102	Oscar Robertson (25)	13–21
35	December 31	@ New York	103–107	Oscar Robertson (32)	13–22
36	January 3	@ Chicago	111–116	Oscar Robertson (40)	13–23
37	January 7	Chicago	112–125	Oscar Robertson (43)	14–23
38	January 8	@ Baltimore	126–94	Happy Hairston (22)	15–23
39	January 11	@ Chicago	106–102	Oscar Robertson (36)	16–23
40	January 13	N Los Angeles	115–125	Oscar Robertson (41)	17–23
41	January 14	St. Louis	105–116	Oscar Robertson (27)	18–23
42	January 18	Boston	119–106	Oscar Robertson (36)	18–24
43	January 19	@ Baltimore	118–122	Oscar Robertson (36)	18–25
44	January 21	Detroit	108–122	Oscar Robertson (35)	19–25
45	January 24	@ New York	126–118	Oscar Robertson (37)	20–25
46	January 25	New York	125–132	Oscar Robertson (37)	21–25
47	January 26	N Detroit	118–110	Oscar Robertson (35)	21–26
48	January 27	@ Philadelphia	107–110	Oscar Robertson (39)	21–27
49	January 28	St. Louis	112–113	Oscar Robertson (30)	22–27
50	January 29	San Francisco	118–121	Oscar Robertson (35)	23–27
51	February 2	N Baltimore	131–125	Adrian Smith (29)	24–27
52	February 3	@ Chicago	113–118	Oscar Robertson (35)	24–28
53	February 4	@ Baltimore	99–109	Oscar Robertson (34)	24–29
54	February 5	@ Boston	121–137	Lucas, McGlocklin, Smith (19)	24–30
55	February 7	N Boston	123–138	Oscar Robertson (35)	24–31
56	February 8	Philadelphia	118–106	Jerry Lucas (25)	24–32
57	February 10	Detroit	104–133	Oscar Robertson (28)	25–32
58	February 11	@ Detroit	132–117	Jerry Lucas (31)	26–32
59	February 12	@ St. Louis	115–118	Oscar Robertson (36)	26–33
60	February 13	@ Philadelphia	123–131	Jerry Lucas (29)	26–34
61	February 15	New York	118–127	Oscar Robertson (46)	27–34
62	February 16	N Detroit	110–122	Oscar Robertson (34)	28–34
63	February 17	N Philadelphia	127–118	Oscar Robertson (27)	28–35
64	February 18	@ New York	123–124	Happy Hairston (33)	28–36
65	February 20	N St. Louis	104–112	Oscar Robertson (36)	29–36
66	February 22	@ Los Angeles	102–103	Flynn Robinson (29)	29–37
67	February 24	@ San Francisco	137–122	Oscar Robertson (35)	30–37
68	February 25	@ San Francisco	129–116	Oscar Robertson (36)	31–37
69	February 26	@ Los Angeles	127–141	Oscar Robertson (40)	31–38
70	February 28	N Philadelphia	127–107	Oscar Robertson (24)	31–39
71	March 1	Los Angeles	116–122	Oscar Robertson (25)	32–39
72	March 3	@ Boston	104–111	Oscar Robertson (26)	32–40
73	March 4	Baltimore	102–109	Oscar Robertson (43)	33–40
74	March 5	@ Chicago	106–113	Oscar Robertson (37)	33–41
75	March 6	N St. Louis	122–129	Oscar Robertson (27)	34–41
76	March 11	Chicago	119–147	Happy Hairston (30)	35–41
77	March 12	@ St. Louis	119–120	Oscar Robertson (30)	35–42
78	March 13	@ Chicago	133–117	Oscar Robertson (43)	36–42
79	March 15	Boston	108–112	Oscar Robertson (31)	37–42
80	March 16	N St. Louis	111–114	Oscar Robertson (32)	38–42
81	March 18	San Francisco	112–127	Adrian Smith (23)	39–42

== Playoffs ==
1967 playoff game log
Division semifinals: 1–3 (home: 0–2; road: 1–1)

Game	Date	Team	Score	High points	High rebounds	High assists	Location Attendance	Series
1	March 21	@ Philadelphia	W 120–116	Oscar Robertson (33)	Dierking, Lucas (18)	Oscar Robertson (16)	Philadelphia Convention Hall; 5,097	1–0
2	March 22	Philadelphia	L 102–123	Oscar Robertson (29)	Connie Dierking (17)	Oscar Robertson (9)	Cincinnati Gardens; 5,276	1–1
3	March 24	@ Philadelphia	L 106–121	Oscar Robertson (25)	Jerry Lucas (23)	Oscar Robertson (13)	Philadelphia Convention Hall; 8,987	1–2
4	March 25	Philadelphia	L 94–112	Happy Hairston (26)	Jerry Lucas (25)	Oscar Robertson (7)	Cincinnati Gardens; 2,624	1–3

1967 schedule

== Player statistics ==
Legend
GP	Games played	GS	Games started	MPG	Minutes per game
FG%	Field-goal percentage	3P%	3-point field-goal percentage	FT%	Free-throw percentage
RPG	Rebounds per game	APG	Assists per game	SPG	Steals per game
BPG	Blocks per game	PPG	Points per game

=== Season ===
Player	GP	GS	MPG	FG%	3FG%	FT%	RPG	APG	SPG	BPG	PPG
Len Chappell											
Connie Dierking											
Happy Hairston											
Freddie Lewis											
Bob Love											
Jerry Lucas											
Jon McGlocklin											
Oscar Robertson											
Flynn Robinson											
Adrian Smith											
Jim Ware											
Walt Wesley											
George Wilson											

=== Playoffs ===
Player	GP	GS	MPG	FG%	3FG%	FT%	RPG	APG	SPG	BPG	PPG
Len Chappell											
Connie Dierking											
Happy Hairston											
Freddie Lewis											
Jerry Lucas											
Oscar Robertson											
Flynn Robinson											
Adrian Smith											
Jim Ware											
Walt Wesley											

== Awards and records ==
- Oscar Robertson, All-NBA First Team
- Jerry Lucas, All-NBA Second Team
