= Chet Walker =

American basketball player (1940–2024)

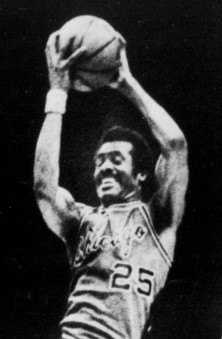
- Walker in 1975

Personal information
- Born: February 22, 1940 Bethlehem, Mississippi, U.S.
- Died: June 8, 2024 (aged 84) Long Beach, California, U.S.
- Listed height: 6 ft 7 in (2.01 m)
- Listed weight: 212 lb (96 kg)

Career information
- High school: Benton Harbor (Benton Harbor, Michigan)
- College: Bradley (1959–1962)
- NBA draft: 1962: 2nd round, 12th overall pick
- Drafted by: Syracuse Nationals
- Playing career: 1962–1975
- Position: Small forward
- Number: 25

Career history
- 1962–1969: Syracuse Nationals / Philadelphia 76ers
- 1969–1975: Chicago Bulls

Career highlights
- NBA champion (1967); 7× NBA All-Star (1964, 1966, 1967, 1970, 1971, 1973, 1974); NBA All-Rookie First Team (1963); 2× Consensus first-team All-American (1961, 1962); Second-team All-American – AP, NABC, UPI (1960); 3× First-team All-MVC (1960–1962); No. 31 retired by Bradley Braves

Career statistics
- Points: 18,831 (18.2 ppg)
- Rebounds: 7,314 (7.1 rpg)
- Assists: 2,126 (2.1 apg)
- Stats at NBA.com
- Stats at Basketball Reference
- Basketball Hall of Fame

Chester Walker (February 22, 1940 – June 8, 2024) was an American professional basketball player in the National Basketball Association (NBA), and was selected in 2012 to become a member of the Naismith Memorial Basketball Hall of Fame. He was a seven-time NBA All-Star. He played 13 seasons in the NBA, seven with the Philadelphia 76ers, and he helped lead the 76ers to an NBA championship in 1967, on a team that has been considered among the best in NBA history. He played his last six seasons for the Chicago Bulls from 1969 to 1975, helping the team reach the playoffs every season he played for Chicago; eventually becoming an inaugural member of the Bulls' Ring of Honor. Walker's teams made the playoffs every season of his career, and he never missed a playoff game; and never missed more than six games during any regular season of his NBA career (playing in over 1,000 games).

Walker played college basketball for the Bradley Braves, twice earning first-team consensus All-American honors, after being named a second-team All-American as a sophomore. Walker was famously "hijacked" by disc jockey Al Benson to attend Bradley, keeping him from attending the University of Nebraska instead. Walker played on the Bradley team that won the 1960 National Invitation Tournament. He became known as "Chet the Jet" at Bradley. Walker also won an Emmy award as a television producer.

== Early life ==
Walker was born in Bethlehem, Mississippi on February 22, 1940, the youngest of John and Regina Walker's ten children, four of whom died before age 10. He lived and worked on the family's small cotton farm, until his mother moved with her youngest children to Benton Harbor, MIchigan after the death of Walker's sister and to escape his abusive father.

Walker played high school basketball for the Benton Harbor High School boys basketball team, under coach Don Farnum. Walker was selected All-State twice in basketball. As a senior, his team was runner up for the 1958 Class A Michigan high school championship, losing to Detroit's Austin Catholic Preparatory School which was led by future fellow NBA Hall of Fame player Dave DeBusschere.

In September 1965, Benton Harbor held a Chet Walker Day, with an appreciation from Governor George Romney read that day.

== College ==
Walker earned a scholarship to Bradley University, where he was a two-time consensus All-America in 1961 and 1962. However, prior to attending Bradley in Peoria, Illinois, he and his mother had agreed Walker would attend the University of Nebraska. In one version of events, disc jockey Al Benson went to Walker's home and agreed to take Walker to the airport in Chicago to head to Nebraska. Instead, Benson brought Walker to Bradley's head coach and athletic director, who flew Walker to Peoria where Walker committed to attending Bradley.

During his three-year career at Bradley, playing in the Missouri Valley Conference, Walker averaged 24.4 points and 12.8 rebounds per game. Walker's speed and agility on the court earned him the nickname "Chet the Jet" (a name that stayed with him through his NBA career). As a sophomore (1959–60), Walker led the team in both scoring (21.8 points per game) and rebounding (13.4 rebounds per game); for a Bradley team that had a 27–2 record. Walker finished in the top-3 Missouri Valley Conference players in total points, points per game, total rebounds, rebounds per game, and made free throws.

The Associated Press (AP) named Walker a second-team All American as a sophomore. He was named first-team All-Missouri Valley Conference in 1960. The AP ranked Bradley fourth nationally after the 1959–60 season. Bradley finished second in the Missouri Valley Conference to the No. 1 ranked University of Cincinnati, led by Oscar Robertson, which went on to play in the 1960 NCAA basketball tournament. Bradley was the only conference team to defeat Cincinnati that season. Bradley went to the National Invitation Tournament (NIT) in 1960, winning the NIT championship game over the Providence Friars, 88–72.

Walker scored 27 points in the preceding 1960 NIT tournament victory over St. Bonaventure, but had been severely nauseous during the game, and had to come in and out of the game. There was some concern at the time that he had been given a glass of orange juice before the game that may have been tampered with, which was reported to the police (who found no foreign substance in the juice after later testing). Walker was still ill for the championship game against Providence, and played less than 19 minutes in the game, scoring only nine points; but seven of those points coming during a decisive time late in the game.

As a junior (1960–61), Walker averaged 25.2 points and 12.6 rebounds per game. Walker led Missouri Valley Conference teams in scoring and was second in rebounds per game. Bradley went 21–5 and ended the season ranked No. 6 by the Associated Press. Bradley again finished second to Cincinnati in the Missouri Valley Conference, and so did not go to the NCAA tournament. Bradley declined an invitation to the 1961 NIT. Walker was an AP and United Press International (UPI) first-team All-American in 1961, and was once again first-team All-Missouri Valley Conference.

As a senior (1961–62), Walker averaged 26.4 points and 12.3 rebounds per game, once more leading Missouri Valley Conference teams in scoring, and finishing second to Cincinnati's Paul Hogue in rebounding (12.4 to 12.3 rebounds per game). Bradley shared the Missouri Valley Conference title in 1962 with Cincinnati; but once again it was Cincinnati that went to the NCAA tournament, after defeating Bradley in a mid-March 1962 playoff game for the Missouri Valley Conference title. Bradley participated in the 1962 NIT tournament, losing in the first round to Dusquesne, 88–85. Walker scored 36 points in that game, including 22 of Bradley's last 29 points. The Associated Press named Walker a first-team All-American in 1962, as did United Press International and the Newspaper Enterprise Association. He was again first-team All-Missouri Valley Conference for the third consecutive season.

Walker is the only Bradley Braves player to be selected a two-time All-America player, and his No. 31 jersey was retired by the school in 1976. He graduated from Bradley in 1962 as the school's all-time leading scorer, and is still its fourth all-time scorer (as of June 2024). He holds Bradley's record for double-doubles, with 54 (through the 2024–25 season); and scored over 30 points in a game 15 times, over 40 points six times, and over 50 points one time while playing for Bradley.

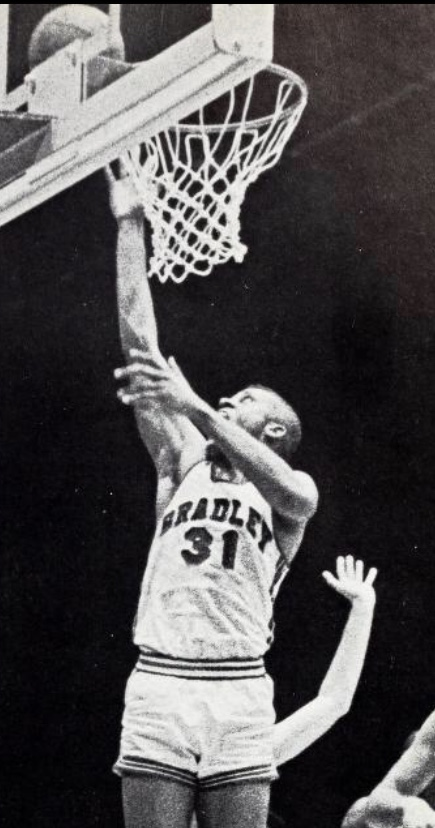
Walker of Bradley University during the 1961–62 season

== NBA career ==
=== Syracuse Nationals/Philadelphia 76ers (1962–1969) ===
Walker was drafted by the Syracuse Nationals in the 1962 NBA draft, and was named to the NBA's first All-Rookie Team in 1963. He followed the team to Philadelphia after his rookie season. In his second year, playing small forward, Walker averaged a double-double (17.3 points and 10.3 rebounds per game) in 36.5 minutes per game, and was selected to play in the 1964 All-Star Game; however the Philadelphia 76ers went 34–46 that season.

The following season (1964–65), center Wilt Chamberlain and strong forward Lucious Jackson joined the 76ers. Walker's minutes fell to 27.7 per game, the fewest he would ever have as a 76er outside of his rookie season; and roughly the same as 76ers' small forward Dave Gambee's 25 minutes per game. Walker averaged 13.2 points and 6.7 rebounds per game that season.

The 76ers were 40–40, and reach the 1965 NBA playoffs. They defeated the Cincinnati Royals in the 1965 Eastern Division semifinals, three games to one. Walker started all four games, averaging 20.5 points and eight rebounds per game. The 76ers lost to the Boston Celtics in the 1965 Eastern Division finals in seven games; losing Game 7 by one point. Walker started all seven games, playing nearly 42 minutes per game, averaging 20.1 points and 6.7 rebounds per game. He had 31 points and 11 rebounds in the 76ers Game 4 victory.

Over the next four seasons with the 76ers (1965–66 to 1968–69), Walker averaged between 32 and 33.6 minutes per game, 15.3 and 19.3 points per game, and 7.4 to 8.1 rebounds per game. He was selected to play in the 1966 NBA All-Star Game as a starter, and the 1967 NBA All-Star Game (scoring 15 points). In 1966, the 76ers lost again in the Eastern Division finals to the Celtics, four games to one; with Walker averaging 36.2 minutes, 14.6 points, 7.4 rebounds and three assists per game.

Walker averaged over 19 points and eight rebounds a game for the 1966–67 76ers, who won 68 games and lost just 13 games during the regular season; which was the best record in NBA history at the time. That team is often considered among the NBA's greatest teams for a single season. During the NBA's 35th anniversary season (1980), a poll carried out by the Professional Basketball Writers Association of America voted the 1966–67 76ers the greatest team in NBA history. The team's head coach was future Naismith Basketball Hall of Fame head coach Alex Hannum, and featured three other future Hall of Fame players in addition to Walker: center Wilt Chamberlain, shooting guard Hal Greer and sixth man Billy Cunningham; along with point guard Wali Jones and power forward Jackson. The 76ers 1967 championship ended the eight-year championship run of the Boston Celtics.

In the 1967 NBA playoffs, the 76ers defeated the Royals in four games, with Walker averaging 20.8 points and 6.8 rebounds per game. Walker averaged 20.6 points and 6.8 rebounds in the 76ers five game Eastern Division finals defeat of the Celtics. In the six-game 1967 NBA Finals win over the San Francisco Warriors, Walker averaged 23.3 points and 8.8 rebounds per game. He had 33 points and 11 rebounds in the 76ers Game 4 win.

The 76ers were 62–20 during the 1967–68 regular season, and lost in seven games to the Celtics in the Eastern Division finals; Walker averaging 20.3 points and 6.4 rebounds per game. That series opened on Friday, April 5, 1968, and was overshadowed by Martin Luther King Jr.'s assassination that occurred a day earlier. There had been consideration that the game be postponed, and most of the teams' black players expected it to be postponed. Instead, the NBA decided to postpone the series' Sunday game as part of a national day of mourning announced by President Lyndon B. Johnson. The players still voted on whether to play the April 5 game, with Chamberlain and Jones voting no, and Walker reported to have said he would not vote because the vote was part of a "dreary charade".

Three months later the 76ers traded Chamberlain to the Los Angeles Lakers before the 1968–69 season began. The 76ers finished the 1968–69 season, 55–27, with Walker averaging 33.6 minutes, 18 points and 7.8 rebounds per game. The 76ers lost to the Celtics in five games in the Eastern Division semifinals, Walker averaging 27.3 minutes, 13.5 points and 5.8 rebounds per game.

In early September 1969, 76ers' coach Dr. Jack Ramsay traded Walker and Shaler Halimon to the Chicago Bulls for Jim Washington and a player to be named later. Ramsay based the trade on his belief that the 76ers had been a high scoring team the previous season, and needed to improve their defense. In his seven years with the Nationals/76ers, the 29-year old Walker averaged 16.2 points and 7.9 rebounds per game, playing nearly 32 minutes per game. He had been an All-Star three times, and averaged 18.9 points and 7.7 rebounds per game in 58 playoff games for the team.

=== Chicago Bulls (1969–1975) ===
Walker went on to play his final six seasons with the Chicago Bulls. During those six seasons, Walker never averaged less than 19.2 points and 5.0 rebounds per game in any season. He was selected as an All-Star four times in Chicago, and the Bulls made the playoffs all six of Walker's seasons with Chicago, under coach Dick Motta.

In Walker's first season with the Bulls (1969–70), he averaged 34.9 minutes, 21.5 points and 7.7 rebounds per game; and was selected as the Bulls' only All-Star that season. He led the Bulls in scoring (19.4 points per game) in their five-game playoff series loss to the Atlanta Hawks in 1970. Walker played alongside power forward Bob Love, who had a breakout season that year averaging 21 points per game. Walker and Love would be paired at the forward positions for the remainder of Walker's career, and were often referred as the best, or among the best, forward pairings in the NBA during their careers together with the Bulls. In 1971, future Hall of Fame New York Knicks' forward Dave DeBusschere said that "'Love and Walker are probably the best pair of forwards in the league'".

Walker averaged 22 points per game in each of the 1970–71 and 1971–72 seasons; and both he and Love played in the 1971 NBA All-Star Game. He led the NBA in free throw shooting percentage in 1970–71 (.859). On February 6, 1972, Walker scored a career-high 56 points during a Bulls win over the Cincinnati Royals. This was a Bulls’ team single game record until Michael Jordan broke Walker's record by scoring 58 points for the Bulls in a February 1987 game.

The Bulls lost the 1971 NBA Western Division semifinals to the Los Angeles Lakers in seven games, with Walker averaging 15 points, 7.1 rebounds and 3.1 assists per game in that series. In the 1972 playoffs, Walker was limited by a knee injury, and center Tom Boerwinkle was unable to play. The Bulls lost in the semifinals four games to none against the Lakers, but Walker averaged only 24.3 minutes and 11.3 points per game.

Walker was selected to play in the 1973 NBA All-Star Game (along with Love) and was a starter in the 1974 NBA All-Star Game. He averaged 19.9 points and five rebounds per game in the 1972–73 season, and 19.3 points and five rebounds per game in the 1973–74 season. The Bulls lost to the Lakers in the 1973 Western Division semifinals in seven games, Walker averaging 16.7 points and 8.9 rebounds per game.

After five years, the Bulls won a Western Division semifinal series in 1974, winning in seven games over the Detroit Pistons. Walker averaged 21.6 points and 5.9 rebounds per game in that series. They lost the Western Division finals in four straight games to the Milwaukee Bucks, Walker averaging 19.8 points and five rebounds per game.

In his final NBA season (1974–75), Walker averaged 19.2 points, 5.7 rebounds and 2.2 assists per game. The Bulls defeated the Kansas City-Omaha Kings in the 1975 Western Division semifinals in six games, Walker averaging 16 points and 3.8 rebounds per game. The Bulls lost the Western Division finals in seven games to the Golden State Warriors. Walker averaged 18.9 points, 5.3 rebounds and 2.3 assists per game in the last series of his career.

In six seasons with the Bulls, Walker averaged 20.6 points and 6.1 rebounds per game during the regular season, and 17.5 points and 6.1 rebounds per game in the playoffs.

=== Role in the players' union ===
Walker was the Bulls representative to the NBA Players Association in 1970, and was a plaintiff in a federal antitrust lawsuit filed against the NBA. The case settled in 1976, but Walker refused to go along with the settlement. Walker had left the Bulls in the 1975–1976 season over a salary dispute, and continued to litigate individually. In a meeting with the Bulls owner, Walker was informed that if he chose to play again, the NBA took the position that Walker was the Bulls "property", a concept that repulsed Walker. He chose never to play again.

== Legacy and honors ==
On February 24, 2012 (two days after his 72nd birthday), it was announced that Walker was elected to the Naismith Memorial Basketball Hall of Fame by the veterans committee. He was formally inducted into the Hall of Fame in Springfield, Massachusetts, on September 7, 2012. Walker was an inaugural member of the Chicago Bulls Ring of Honor. Walker was a seven-time participant in the NBA All-Star Game. In 2003, he was named to Bradley University's Team of the Century. Bradley retired his jersey No. 31 in 1976. He is a member of the Bradley Athletics Hall of Fame and the Greater Peoria Sports Hall of Fame.

The Naismith Hall of Fame describes Walker as "one of the best open court forwards in the league with his power and force". During Walker's 2012 Hall of Fame induction, former teammate Billy Cunningham stated that defensive players covering Walker knew what Walker was going to do, and still could not stop him. In his 13-year NBA career, Walker scored a total of 18,831 points, ranking 70th all-time in NBA history and 74th all-time in ABA/NBA history (through the 2025–26 season). He never missed more than six games in any of his NBA seasons, playing in over 1,000 games. Walker's teams made the playoffs every season of his career, and he never missed a playoff game.

Walker also excelled at drawing fouls. During the first six years of his career, Walker's free throw shooting percentage was between .699 and .766. Starting in the 1968–69 season Walker became an outstanding free throw shooter; especially during his years with the Bulls where he had a six-year .854 free throw shooting percentage. He led the NBA with an accuracy rate of 85.9 percent in 1970–71, was second in 1969–70 (.850), fourth in 1971–72 (.847) and 1973–74 (.875), and ranked among the top-10 free throw shooters two other times.

== Personal life ==
After his playing days, Walker became a moderately successful TV movie producer. He is the author of a memoir entitled Long Time Coming: A Black Athlete's Coming-of-Age in America (1995). He was executive producer of the 1979 television miniseries, Freedom Road, that starred Muhammad Ali and Kris Kristofferson. He co-produced the 1989 television series A Mother's Courage starring Alfre Woodard, based on the life of Mary Thomas, mother of NBA hall of famer Isiah Thomas, which won an Emmy for Outstanding Children's Program. Walker also appeared in The White Shadow in season three's "If Your Number's Up, Get it Down" as a former Chicago Bulls teammate of Coach Ken Reeves (Ken Howard).

== Death ==
Walker died in Long Beach, California, on June 8, 2024, at the age of 84. The NBA stated Walker's death was the result of a long-term illness.

== NBA career statistics ==
Legend
GP	Games played	GS	Games started	MPG	Minutes per game
FG%	Field goal percentage	3P%	3-point field goal percentage	FT%	Free throw percentage
RPG	Rebounds per game	APG	Assists per game	SPG	Steals per game
BPG	Blocks per game	PPG	Points per game	**Bold**	Career high
†	Won an NBA championship	*	Led the league

=== Regular season ===
Year	Team	GP	GS	MPG	FG%	3P%	FT%	RPG	APG	SPG	BPG	PPG
1962–63	Syracuse	78	–	25.5	.469	–	.699	7.2	1.1	–	–	12.3
1963–64	Philadelphia	76	–	**36.5**	.440	–	.711	**10.3**	1.6	–	–	17.3
1964–65	Philadelphia	79	–	27.7	.403	–	.742	6.7	1.7	–	–	13.2
1965–66	Philadelphia	80	–	32.5	.451	–	.716	8.0	**2.5**	–	–	15.3
1966–67†	Philadelphia	81	–	33.2	.488	–	.766	8.1	2.3	–	–	19.3
1967–68	Philadelphia	**82**	–	32.0	.460	–	.726	7.4	1.9	–	–	17.9
1968–69	Philadelphia	**82**	–	33.6	.484	–	.804	7.8	1.8	–	–	18.0
1969–70	Chicago	78	–	34.9	.477	–	.850	7.7	**2.5**	–	–	21.5
1970–71	Chicago	81	–	36.1	.465	–	.859*	7.3	2.2	–	–	**22.0**
1971–72	Chicago	78	–	33.2	**.505**	–	.847	6.1	2.3	–	–	**22.0**
1972–73	Chicago	79	–	31.1	.478	–	.832	5.0	2.3	–	–	19.9
1973–74	Chicago	**82**	–	32.5	.486	–	**.875**	5.0	2.4	**0.8**	0.0	19.3
1974–75	Chicago	76	–	32.3	.487	–	.860	5.7	2.2	0.6	**0.1**	19.2
Career		1,032	–	32.4	.470	–	.796	7.1	2.1	0.7	0.1	18.2
All-Star		7	1	17.9	.435	–	.850	2.6	1.3	0.0	0.0	8.1

=== Playoffs ===
Year	Team	GP	GS	MPG	FG%	3P%	FT%	RPG	APG	SPG	BPG	PPG
1963	Syracuse	5	–	26.0	.509	–	.733	9.4	1.8	–	–	15.2
1964	Philadelphia	5	–	38.0	.390	–	.739	**10.4**	2.6	–	–	18.8
1965	Philadelphia	11	–	**42.6**	.480	–	.760	7.2	1.6	–	–	20.3
1966	Philadelphia	5	–	36.2	.375	–	.806	7.4	3.0	–	–	14.6
1967†	Philadelphia	**15**	–	36.7	.467	–	.807	7.6	2.1	–	–	**21.7**
1968	Philadelphia	13	–	37.3	.410	–	.679	7.4	1.8	–	–	19.1
1969	Philadelphia	4	–	27.3	**.535**	–	.667	5.8	2.0	–	–	13.5
1970	Chicago	5	–	35.6	.422	–	.818	8.4	2.2	–	–	19.4
1971	Chicago	7	–	33.4	.440	–	.708	7.1	**3.1**	–	–	15.0
1972	Chicago	4	–	24.3	.421	–	.813	3.5	1.0	–	–	11.3
1973	Chicago	7	–	32.7	.347	–	**.892**	8.9	2.0	–	–	16.7
1974	Chicago	11	–	36.6	.509	–	.861	5.5	1.6	0.9	**0.1**	20.9
1975	Chicago	13	–	33.2	.494	–	.880	4.6	1.8	**1.0**	**0.1**	17.5
Career		105	–	35.1	.449	–	.787	7.0	2.0	1.0	0.1	18.2

== See also ==
- List of NBA career free throw scoring leaders
