= Norm Van Lier =

American basketball player (1947–2009)

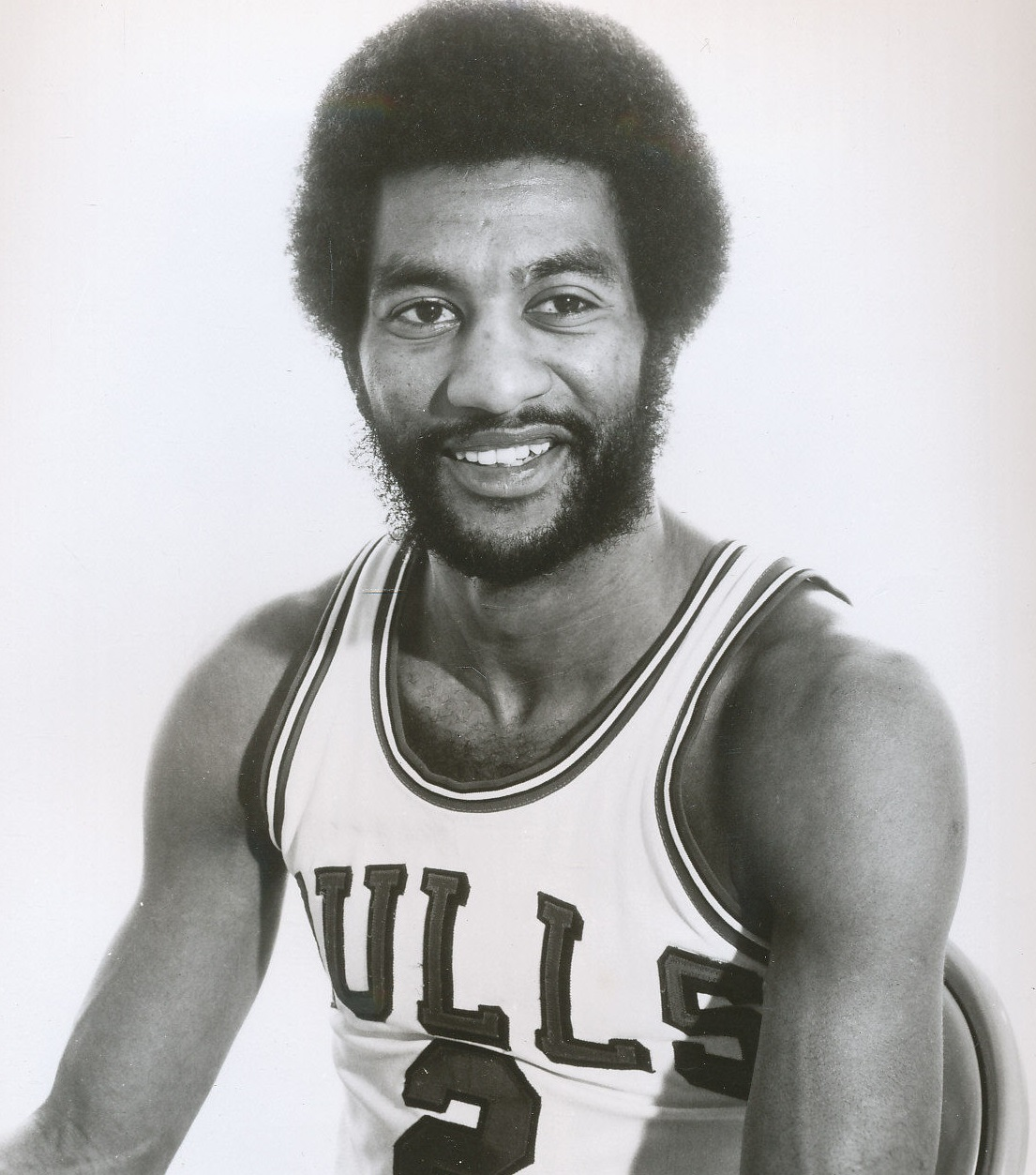
- Van Lier with the Chicago Bulls in 1971

Personal information
- Born: April 1, 1947 East Liverpool, Ohio, U.S.
- Died: February 26, 2009 (aged 61) Chicago, Illinois, U.S.
- Listed height: 6 ft 1 in (1.85 m)
- Listed weight: 173 lb (78 kg)

Career information
- High school: Midland (Midland, Pennsylvania)
- College: Saint Francis (PA) (1966–1969)
- NBA draft: 1969: 3rd round, 34th overall pick
- Drafted by: Chicago Bulls
- Playing career: 1969–1979
- Position: Point guard
- Number: 23, 2, 4
- Coaching career: 1986–1990

Career history

Playing
- 1969–1971: Cincinnati Royals
- 1971–1978: Chicago Bulls
- 1978–1979: Milwaukee Bucks

Career highlights
- 3× NBA All-Star (1974, 1976, 1977); All-NBA Second Team (1974); 3× NBA All-Defensive First Team (1974, 1976, 1977); 5× NBA All-Defensive Second Team (1971–1973, 1975, 1978); NBA assists leader (1971); No. 12 retired by Saint Francis Red Flash

Career statistics
- Points: 8,770 (11.8 ppg)
- Rebounds: 3,596 (4.8 rpg)
- Assists: 5,217 (7.0 apg)
- Stats at NBA.com
- Stats at Basketball Reference

Norman Allen Van Lier III (April 1, 1947 – February 26, 2009) was an American professional basketball player and television broadcaster who spent the majority of his career in the National Basketball Association (NBA) with the Chicago Bulls. He was an NBA All-Star three times, a one-time second-team All-NBA selection, a first-team NBA All-Defensive Team selection three times, and a second-team NBA All-Defensive Team selection five times. Playing with the Cincinnati Royals in his second NBA season, Van Lier led the NBA in assists (10.1 per game). He was widely praised for his all-around play on offense and defense, for his effort in playing persistently hard in games, and for raising his level of play in important games. He is one of two players in NBA history with a double-double in a game, without scoring any points in that game. He was closely associated with his Bulls' backcourt teammate Jerry Sloan, who were together considered among the greatest defensive guard duos in NBA history. An extremely popular player in Chicago, he later covered the Bulls as a sports broadcaster and commentator, with similar popularity among Chicago fans.

He attended Saint Francis University in Loretto, Pennsylvania, where he averaged a double-double over his three-year varsity career in scoring and rebounding. He averaged over 10 rebounds per game even though he was only a 6 ft 1 in (1.85 m) guard. The Associated Press twice named Van Lier to its first-team Pennsylvania All-State college teams, and once to its second team. As a senior in high school, he helped lead the 1965 Midland High School Leopards to a perfect 28–0 record and a Pennsylvania state championship.

== Early life ==
Van Lier was born on April 1, 1947, in East Liverpool, Ohio to Helen and Norm Sr. Norm Sr. was the son of a Baptist preacher, and worked in a steel mill for decades (reported as 31 or 40 years). Van Lier was raised, along with three brothers and a sister, in Midland, Pennsylvania. Van Lier had six brothers in all, three of whom died after birth including a son Norm Sr. named Elgin Baylor Van Lier I. Van Lier would look back fondly to his childhood playing tackle football with a taped coffee can for a ball due to their circumstances. He would later credit this upbringing in forming his famed work ethic later in life.

== High school career ==
Van Lier was a member of the 1965 Midland High School Leopards, considered by many to be one of the greatest high school basketball teams in Pennsylvania history, and of all time. Van Lier played guard, and was the quarterback of the basketball team. Van Lier was known as the "Golden Spoon" because of his playmaking ability.

Midland finished the 1964–65 season with a perfect 28–0 record. Midland head coach Hank Kuzma said that Van Lier's ballhandling skills were such that "'Nobody could press us; that’s one reason we were so good'". Midland easily won the Western Pennsylvania Interscholastic Athletic League (WPIAL) title. The Leopards went on to win the statewide Pennsylvania Interscholastic Athletic Association (PIAA) Class A championship game, 90–61, the most points ever scored in the 45-year history of that game at that time. Midland's average margin of victory that season was 31.3 points per game.

The Associated Press named Van Lier a member of its Pennsylvania high school All-State second team in 1965. Van Lier was also named the most valuable player in a late March 1965 all-star tournament between a team of Pennsylvania high school all-stars against a team of national high school all-stars. It is also reported that teammate Simmie Hill was the Pennsylvania most valuable player in that game.

Van Lier's Midland teams only lost two regular season games in three years. One of Van Lier's teammates was future NBA and ABA player Simmie Hill, who would later be drafted by the Chicago Bulls in the second round, with Van Lier taken in the third round of the same draft by the Bulls. During weekends, Van Lier would hitchhike to the playgrounds in Harlem, once even playing with future NBA Hall of Famer Billy Cunningham. Coach Kuzma said of Van Lier, "'He was a fierce competitor in practice and in games'". Hill, who was considered a top basketball star in high school, said he would only have been an average player without Van Lier's being his teammate.

Van Lier was also a co-captain of his football team, where he played both as a standout quarterback, and at safety. He was recruited to play for several colleges (such as Nebraska, USC and Alabama), but none would have allowed him to play his desired position of quarterback, discouraging him from pursuing football. It is also reported that he did not choose football because his mother discouraged him from playing football. Van Lier stated that when an Alabama assistant coach came to visit him at his high school, the coach said "'I heard you are quite a quarterback. ... Boy if I had known you was colored I would never had come'".

He also played high school baseball, and had been on his high school and county all-star teams. Van Lier had received offers to play professional baseball as well, and turned down a $25,000 offer from the St. Louis Cardinals because his mother did not want him to play in the segregated south.

== College career ==
Van Lier's modest 6 ft 1 in (1.85 m) stature and his emphasis on defense kept him under the radar of stardom, and he was not recruited by major basketball powers. Van Lier was recruited to attend Saint Francis University in Loretto, Pennsylvania by Saint Francis assistant basketball coach John Clark, who at one time had also played under coach Hank Kuzma; and Van Lier chose to attend Saint Francis. He had also been heavily recruited by the University of Cincinnati's head basketball coach Tay Baker.

Van Lier played on Saint Francis's varsity basketball team from 1966 to 1969, as a 6 ft 1 in guard. During his Saint Francis career, Van Lier became known as skilled in all aspects of basketball. The Saint Francis University Athletics Hall of Fame says of Van Lier, "His greatest asset . . . was his ability to excel at all aspects of the game. . . . 'Stormin' Norman coupled his scoring, rebounding and passing skills with a defensive tenacity and a knack for making the big play under pressure". He also was known as a fierce competitor and excellent ball handler. Van Lier retained all of these qualities as a professional player. After Van Lier's death, NBA Commissioner David Stern described him as a “'complete player, a wonderful passer, [and] a tenacious rebounder...."

Clark became Saint Francis's head coach in Van Lier's sophomore season (1966–67). Van Lier averaged 16.7 points and 10.4 rebounds per game that season. Only center Larry Lewis averaged more rebounds than Van Lier on that team. The Associated Press named Van Lier to its Pennsylvania All-State college first-team as a sophomore; the only sophomore named to the first-team.

As a junior (1967–68), Van Lier averaged a team-leading 18.8 points per game, and was again the team's second leading rebounder (10.9 rebounds per game), behind only Lewis. While participating in the Quaker City Classic tournament in Philadelphia in late December 1967, Van Lier set a tournament record with 12 assists in a game (while scoring 17 points). Van Lier set a then Saint Francis school record for assists in the 1967–68 season. In 1968, he was the only Pennsylvania college player to repeat as an Associated Press first-team All-State selection for Pennsylvania.

As a senior (1968–69), Van Lier averaged a team-leading 21.0 points per game; while again being second to Lewis in rebounding, with a 9.4 per game average. The Associated Press selected him to the All-Pennsylvania college second team that season.

Over his three years at Saint Francis, Van Lier was a standout defensive guard who also scored 1,410 points during his collegiate career. He averaged a double-double, 18.8 points per game and 10.3 rebounds per game. During those three seasons, Saint Francis had win–loss records of 20–6, 19–6, and 16–8 (after having losing records in the three seasons prior to Van Lier's joining the team).

Van Lier graduated in 1969 with a double major in history and special education.

== Professional career ==
=== Cincinnati Royals (1969–1971) ===
Van Lier was selected by the Chicago Bulls in the third round of the 1969 NBA draft, 34th overall. Before the season started, on October 12, 1969 he was traded to the Cincinnati Royals for Walt Wesley in a three-team trade that also involved the Atlanta Hawks. Van Lier had also been selected by the New York Nets in the 1969 American Basketball Association draft. Van Lier chose the NBA.

Van Lier started as a rookie (1969–70) with the Royals under head coach Bob Cousy, who had been a Hall of Fame guard and six-time NBA champion with the Boston Celtics. Van Lier played in the Royals' backcourt alongside future Hall of Fame guard Oscar Robertson. He averaged 35.7 minutes, 9.5 points, 5.0 rebounds, and 6.2 assists per game. Cousy believed that the only better rookie in the NBA that season was Kareem Abdul-Jabbar (then known as Lew Alcindor). Cousy said that it was rare for a rookie to start, and that Van Lier had been a major contributor to the Royals that season, also observing: "'Norm doesn't possess that much physical ability or size but he more than offsets this with a constant determination, aggressive play and a dedicated approach to the game'".

The following season (1970–71), Van Lier played in all 82 games, now in the backcourt with future Hall of Fame guard Nate Archibald. He was among the top NBA players in both offense and defense that season. Van Lier averaged a team leading 40.5 minutes per game and 10.1 assists per game. He led the NBA in total assists (832) and assists per game, and was the only player to average 10 assists per game in the NBA that season. Van Lier also averaged 16 points and 7.1 rebounds per game. He was named at guard to the NBA's second team All-Defensive Team, as was his future Chicago Bulls' teammate, guard Jerry Sloan.

On January 5, 1971, Van Lier became the first player in NBA history to have a scoreless double-double, with zero points, 13 assists and 11 rebounds in a victory against the Los Angeles Lakers. A scoreless double-double did not happen for another 50 years, when on December 26, 2021, rookie Josh Giddey of the Oklahoma City Thunder compiled 10 assists and 10 rebounds in the Thunder's 117–112 win over the New Orleans Pelicans.

Van Lier flourished under Cousy's tutelage at Cincinnati (and even dated Cousy's daughter for over a year). As a coach, Cousy focused on the team playing as a unit, instead of as individuals, which fit Van Lier's own style of play. Cousy called Van Lier a "'coach’s dream'", who greatly motivated all of his teammates by example through an all-out playing style. Van Lier's playing style in the NBA was characterized not by scoring, but by "penetrating and passing off, playing defense, and moving the ball and the team".

Van Lier was renowned for his physical and relentless defense, his fearlessness, and his hard-nosed play with the Royals. During a preseason game between the Royals and Chicago Bulls, Van Lier got in a brawl with his future teammate and later close friend Jerry Sloan (who had a similar approach to playing hard and aggressively). Their fight started during the game; and then continued after the game. Van Lier later said he had always admired Sloan because of their similar style of play; but moreover, when he rejoined the Bulls in 1971, "'Jerry made me part of what was happening right away. He was a real human being. It was strange. He was a white person, but he was for everybody'".

Van Lier played in 10 games for the Royals to begin the 1971–72 season. Cousy told Van Lier the Royals backcourt of the 6 ft 1 in Van Lier and the 6 ft 1 in Archibald was too small, and asked Van Lier where he wanted to be traded. Van Lier told Cousy to trade him to the Bulls. In early November, the Royals traded Van Lier back to the Bulls for center Jim Fox and a future draft choice.

=== Chicago Bulls (1971–1978) ===
In trading for Van Lier, Bulls general manager Pat Williams and head coach Dick Motta believed Van Lier was the best guard in the league outside of the NBA's superstar guards. Van Lier played under the volatile Motta from 1971 through the 1975–1976 season. Now paired up with Bulls' guard Jerry Sloan (1971 to 1976), they formed "the roughest back court combination in the NBA" on defense. Other "pundits" asserted the two formed the best defensive backcourt in NBA history. Van Lier remained with the Bulls through the 1977–78 season, appearing in three All-Star games (1974, 1976, 1977) over the course of seven seasons. While with the Bulls, he was named to the NBA's first-team All-Defensive Team three times and the second-team All-Defensive Team four times.

Van Lier played in 69 games for the Bulls in 1971–72, averaging 31 minutes, 12.1 points, 7.1 assists, and 4.3 rebounds per game. He was named to the second team NBA All-Defensive Team for the second consecutive season. Sloan was named to the first team, and Bulls forward Bob Love was also named to the second team. The Bulls gave up the fewest points of any NBA team that season (102.9 points per game). They were swept in the Western Conference semifinals by the eventual NBA champion Los Angeles Lakers. Van Lier averaged 14 points, 8.3 assists, and 6.3 rebounds per game in that series.

The following season (1972–73), Van Lier averaged 13.9 points, 7.1 assists, and 5.5 rebounds per game. He was named to the second team NBA All-Defensive Team for the third consecutive season, and was the only Bull to make an All-Defensive Team that season. The Bulls gave up the third fewest points of any NBA team (100.6 per game). They were second in the Midwest Division with a 51–31 record.

During a late March 1973 game against the Portland Trail Blazers, the 173 lb (78.5 kg) Van Lier and Portland's 6 ft 8 in (2.03 m) 225 lb (102 kg) Sidney Wicks got into a fight and exchanged punches, with Van Lier later chasing Wicks with a metal folding chair before he was restrained. Before the fight started, Van Lier believed that Wicks had hit him deliberately during the game with an elbow, and had similarly done so two weeks earlier. In explaining chasing Wicks with the metal chair, Van Lier said "'I get a lot of bumps playing and I expect it. But what Wicks did is unforgivable and if I have to take a chair and go after him, you'd better believe I'm going to do it. I'm not insane, but I was going to use that chair and plant it on him somewhere'".

The Bulls lost to the Lakers again in the 1973 Western Conference semifinals, but this time in seven games. Van Lier averaged 14.4 points, 5.1 assists, and 5.3 rebounds per game against the Lakers in 1973. Game 6 was a career highlight for Van Lier. He had 10 steals, held the Lakers' future Hall of Fame guard Gail Goodrich to four points, and scored 26 points in a 101–93 win over the Lakers. The Associated Press described him as providing "most of the electricity" for the Bulls, and "a tiger as the Bulls' playmaker and defensive kingpin”. Van Lier led the Bulls in Game 7 with a game-high 28 points and 14 rebounds, in a three-point loss. After Game 7 Lakers' forward Bill Bridges said "VanLier [sic] played one of the great all-time basketball games'".

The 1973-74 season was possibly Van Lier's best season. He was named to the first-team NBA All-Defensive Team for the first time, was named second-team All-NBA, was tied for ninth in voting on the NBA's Most Valuable Player Award, and was selected as an All-Star for the first time. He averaged 14.3 points, 6.9 assists, and 4.7 rebounds per game during the season. The Bulls had a 54–28 record. Sloan was also named to the first-team NBA All-Defensive Team and Love to the second team; and the Bulls were second in the NBA defensively as a team, giving up only 98.7 points per game.

The Bulls defeated the Detroit Pistons in seven games to win the 1974 Western Conference semifinals. Van Lier averaged 12.9 points, 6.7 assists, 4.7 rebounds, and 1.3 steals per game, playing 40.4 minutes per game. The Bulls were swept by the Milwaukee Bucks in the Western Conference finals. Van Lier led the Bulls in playing nearly 46 minutes per game. He averaged 17.8 points, seven assists, 3.5 rebounds, and two steals per game in that series.

The Bulls won the Midwest Division in 1974–75 with a 45–37 record. Van Lier was named to the second-team NBA All-Defensive Team along with Love, with Sloan being named to the first team. The Bulls again led the NBA defensively, allowing only 95 points per game. Van Lier was 11th in Most Valuable Player voting. During the season, he averaged 15 points, 5.8 assists, 4.7 rebounds, and two steals per game.

The Bulls won the 1975 Western Conference semifinals in six games over the Kansas City–Omaha Kings. Van Lier averaged 11.7 points, 4.2 assists, 4.8 rebounds, and 1.8 assists per game. The Bulls won Game 1 behind Van Lier's defense against Nate Archibald. Archibald averaged 26.5 points per game in the regular season, but Van Lier kept him to 12 points in that game; while scoring 20 himself. Archibald averaged only 20.2 points over the course of the series.

The Bulls lost the Western Conference finals to the eventual NBA champion Golden State Warriors in seven games. Van Lier averaged 44.4 minutes, 18 points, 5.1 assists, 5.3 rebounds, and 1.3 steals per game in the series. In the Bulls Game 3 victory, Van Lier played the entire game. He had 35 points, nine assists, nine rebounds, three steals and a blocked shot. The 35 points was a career high. Golden State coach Al Attles called Van Lier the key to the game.

In both 1975–76 and 1976–77, Van Lier was selected as an All-Star, and was named first-team NBA All-Defensive Team. He started in the 1977 All-Star game, and had 18 points, seven rebounds, three assists, and three steals. In 1975–76, Van Lier averaged 12.6 points, 6.6 assists, 5.4 rebounds, and two steals per game; and in 1976–77 he averaged 10.2 points, 7.8 assists, 4.5 rebounds, and 1.6 steals per game. On January 19, 1977, Van Lier broke the record for the longest successful field goal in NBA history at 84 feet; the record stood for 24 years until Baron Davis eclipsed it on November 17, 2001, from a distance of 89 feet. In his final season with the Bulls (1977–78), Van Lier was again named to the second-team NBA All-Defensive Team; and averaged 7.3 points, 6.8 assists, 3.6 rebounds, and 1.8 steals per game. Van Lier was waived by the Bulls on October 11, 1978.

Van Lier played in 535 regular season games during his Bulls' career, averaging 35.7 minutes, 12.2 points, 6.9 assists, and 4.7 rebounds per game. From 1971 to 1975, he appeared in 35 playoff games for the Bulls, averaging between 14 and 15.1 points per game, 4.7 and 8.3 assists per game, and 4.3 and 6.3 rebounds per game.

=== Milwaukee Bucks (1978–1979) ===
After being waived by the Bulls, Don Nelson and the Milwaukee Bucks signed him in late October. Nelson had always admired Van Lier as a player, and was the one coach in the NBA who thought Van Lier could still play. Van Lier only lasted with the team until late January 1979, as Van Lier could no longer play at an NBA level. Van Lier also had become addicted to Quaaludes to deal with constant pain over the years. Van Lier stated he was prescribed the drugs by team physicians so that he would be able to play despite recurrent muscle spasms in his back. He believed some of his back problems stemmed from the 1973 fight with Sidney Wicks. Bucks coach Don Nelson helped Van Lier get the treatment necessary to overcome that addiction. Van Lier said of Nelson, "'God bless him, he was the coach of the Bucks and he cared more about me the human being than me the player'". The Bucks waived him on January 21, 1979.

Over his ten-year career, Van Lier had totals of 8,770 points, 5,217 assists, and 3,596 rebounds; averaging 11.8 points, 7.0 assists, and 4.8 rebounds per game.

== Coaching career ==
On June 2, 1986, Van Lier was announced as the head coach for the Rockford Lightning of the Continental Basketball Association (CBA). On December 30, he was fired by the Lightning after he accumulated a 4–8 record.

In 1989, Van Lier was the assistant coach of the Worcester Counts in the World Basketball League.

Van Lier was the head basketball coach for the Worcester Vocational Technical High School team during part of the 1989–90 season. His team reached the Massachusetts Division II championship game.

== Media career ==
Van Lier served as a color analyst on Bulls radio broadcasts from 1980 to 1982. From 1992 to 2009, he was a television pre-game and post-game analyst for Chicago Bulls games, originally for SportsChannel, and later Fox Sports Chicago and Comcast SportsNet Chicago, winning an Emmy for the 1995–1996 season. He frequently appeared on other Chicago television programs to discuss the Bulls, and co-hosted shows on sports talk radio, including "the Bull and the Bear" on WSCR-AM. He also did afternoon sports talk on WMVP. Van Lier was a beloved icon in Chicago as a sports commentator and analyst, and was known as an outspoken analyst who freely criticized lackadaisical play.

Van Lier also served as a special disc jockey on the Chicago rock music station 97.9 WLUP. In 2002 and 2004, he had supporting roles in the movies Barbershop and Barbershop 2: Back in Business.

== Public service ==
Van Lier was a member of Project Teamwork, a group formed by the Reebok Foundation working to improve racial and human rights sensitivity in school-age children.

== Legacy and honors ==
In 1999, Van Lier was inducted into the Saint Francis Athletics Hall of Fame. The school retired his number 12 jersey. He was inducted into the Cambria County, Pennsylvania Sports Hall of Fame in 1981. He was inducted into the Beaver County, Pennsylvania Sports Hall of Fame in 1984.

On June 21, 2008, Van Lier was inducted into the WPIAL Hall of Fame. "Western Pennsylvania is football country, but my years are considered the golden era of basketball not only in the state but maybe the country", Van Lier said that night. "Uniontown, Midland, Schenley and Ambridge could play with anybody, anytime and in any era in the country".

Van Lier was one of the most popular Bulls players of the 1970s, being "worshipped all over Chicago". He carried the nickname "Stormin' Norman" for his tenacity and aggression. Former teammate Artis Gilmore said "'Norm was as tough as anybody . . . He was a small individual and would take the challenge. He would take the charge form Wilt Chamberlain'". Bulls' teammate Bob Love, who was selected to three NBA second-team All-Defensive Teams, said at the time of Van Lier's death in 2009 that Van Lier was "'not only the best all-round point guard the Bulls ever had, but the best defensive point guard to ever play the game'".

During his ten-year career, Van Lier was named to three first-team NBA All-Defensive Teams and five second-team NBA All-Defensive Teams. As of 2025–26, only 14 players have more combined first- and second-team NBA All-Defensive Team selections than Van Lier, and five others also have eight total combined selections. Of those 20 players, among players eligible for induction into the Naismith Basketball Hall of Fame (as of 2026), only Van Lier and Bruce Bowen are not in the Hall of Fame.

== Death ==
On February 25, 2009, Van Lier was unexpectedly absent from his scheduled television appearance on Comcast SportsNet following a Bulls game. He was found dead in his apartment in Chicago's Near West Side neighborhood on February 26, 2009. He had a pacemaker implanted five months earlier. Fellow Bulls broadcaster and former Bulls head coach Johnny "Red" Kerr also died later that day.

== Career statistics ==
Legend
GP	Games played	GS	Games started	MPG	Minutes per game
FG%	Field goal percentage	3P%	3-point field goal percentage	FT%	Free throw percentage
RPG	Rebounds per game	APG	Assists per game	SPG	Steals per game
BPG	Blocks per game	PPG	Points per game	**Bold**	Career high
*	Led the league

=== NBA ===
==== Regular season ====
Year	Team	GP	GS	MPG	FG%	3P%	FT%	RPG	APG	SPG	BPG	PPG
1969–70	Cincinnati	81	—	35.7	.403	—	.741	5.0	6.2	—	—	9.5
1970–71	Cincinnati	**82***	—	**40.5**	.420	—	.816	**7.1**	**10.1***	—	—	**16.0**
1971–72	Cincinnati	10	—	27.5	.311	—	.773	5.8	5.1	—	—	7.3
1971–72	Chicago	69	—	31.0	**.456**	—	.791	4.3	7.1	—	—	12.1
1972–73	Chicago	80	—	36.0	.445	—	.787	5.5	7.1	—	—	13.9
1973–74	Chicago	80	—	35.8	.406	—	.778	4.7	6.9	**2.0**	.1	14.3
1974–75	Chicago	70	—	37.0	.420	—	.792	4.7	5.8	**2.0**	.2	15.0
1975–76	Chicago	76	—	39.8	.366	—	.737	5.4	6.6	**2.0**	**.3**	12.6
1976–77	Chicago	**82***	—	37.8	.412	—	.778	4.5	7.8	1.6	.2	10.2
1977–78	Chicago	78	—	32.4	.419	—	.751	3.6	6.8	1.8	.1	7.3
1978–79	Milwaukee	38	—	14.6	.390	—	**.904**	1.1	4.2	1.1	.1	2.8
Career		746	—	35.1	.414	—	.780	4.8	7.0	1.8	.2	11.8
All-Star		3	1	12.3	.286	—	.500	1.0	1.0	.7	.3	1.7

==== Playoffs ====
Year	Team	GP	GS	MPG	FG%	3P%	FT%	RPG	APG	SPG	BPG	PPG
1972	Chicago	4	—	36.0	.415	—	**.857**	**6.3**	8.3	—	—	14.0
1973	Chicago	7	—	36.9	.349	—	.733	5.3	5.1	—	—	14.4
1974	Chicago	11	—	42.4	**.424**	—	.830	4.3	6.8	1.5	.3	14.6
1975	Chicago	**13**	—	42.1	.409	—	.747	5.2	4.7	1.5	**.4**	**15.1**
1977	Chicago	3	—	**44.7**	.158	—	.833	5.0	**9.7**	**3.3**	.3	5.3
Career		38	—	40.8	.389	—	.784	5.0	6.2	1.7	.3	13.9

== See also ==
- List of NBA single-game steals leaders
