= Rowland Garrett =

American basketball player (born 1950)

Personal information
- Born: June 16, 1950 (age 76) Canton, Mississippi, U.S.
- Listed height: 6 ft 6 in (1.98 m)
- Listed weight: 210 lb (95 kg)

Career information
- High school: Rogers (Canton, Mississippi)
- College: Florida State (1969–1972)
- NBA draft: 1972: 5th round, 78th overall pick
- Drafted by: Chicago Bulls
- Playing career: 1972–1980
- Position: Small forward
- Number: 23, 24

Career history
- 1972–1975: Chicago Bulls
- 1975–1977: Cleveland Cavaliers
- 1977: Milwaukee Bucks
- 1978–1979: Pallalcesto Amatori Udine
- 1979–1980: Brill Cagliari

Career NBA statistics
- Points: 1,337 (5.1 ppg)
- Rebounds: 607 (2.3 rpg)
- Assists: 106 (0.4 apg)
- Stats at NBA.com
- Stats at Basketball Reference

Rowland G. Garrett (born July 16, 1950) is an American former professional basketball player.

A 6'6" forward from Canton, Mississippi, Garrett played at Florida State University, and helped lead the Seminoles to the 1972 NCAA Men's Division I Basketball Championship Game, where the team lost to UCLA 81–76. Garrett was later selected by the Chicago Bulls with the 78th pick of the 1972 NBA draft. He played sparingly with the Bulls as a rookie, but earned the respect of coach Dick Motta, and remained on the team for several years. During the first three games of the 1975–76 season, he tallied a combined 51 points and 21 rebounds, including a 22-point, 14 rebound performance in a victory over the Seattle SuperSonics on October 28, 1975.

On November 27, 1975, Garrett was traded to the Cleveland Cavaliers with Nate Thurmond for Steve Patterson and Eric Fernsten. After playing parts of two seasons with the Cavaliers, Garrett was then traded on January 14, 1977, with two first-round draft choices to the Milwaukee Bucks for Elmore Smith and Gary Brokaw. Garrett struggled to find playing time in Milwaukee, and was waived before the start of the 1977–78 season. His stint with the Bucks proved to be his last in the NBA. Over a five-year NBA career, he averaged 5.1 points per game and 2.3 rebounds per game.

Garrett was one of several former players who participated in the Chicago Bulls' 20th and 25th anniversary games in 1985 and 1990. As of 2007, he owned a chemical manufacturing company in his home state.

== NBA career statistics ==
Legend
GP	Games played	GS	Games started	MPG	Minutes per game
FG%	Field goal percentage	3P%	3-point field goal percentage	FT%	Free throw percentage
RPG	Rebounds per game	APG	Assists per game	SPG	Steals per game
BPG	Blocks per game	PPG	Points per game	**Bold**	Career high

=== Regular season ===
Year	Team	GP	GS	MPG	FG%	3P%	FT%	RPG	APG	SPG	BPG	PPG
1972–73	Chicago	35	-	6.0	.441	-	.677	1.7	0.2	-	-	3.6
1973–74	Chicago	41	-	9.1	.370	-	.656	1.7	0.3	0.1	0.2	3.8
1974–75	Chicago	**70**	-	16.9	**.481**	-	.794	3.5	**0.6**	0.3	0.2	7.6
1975–76	Chicago	14	-	**23.1**	.435	-	**.864**	**5.4**	0.5	**0.6**	**0.3**	**10.9**
1975–76	Cleveland	41	-	5.3	.402	-	.714	1.0	0.2	0.4	0.1	2.9
1976–77	Cleveland	29	-	7.4	.430	-	.818	1.4	0.2	0.2	0.1	3.4
1976–77	Milwaukee	33	-	11.6	.452	-	.793	2.2	**0.6**	0.4	0.2	4.7
Career		263	-	11.0	.441	-	.772	2.3	0.4	0.3	0.2	5.1

=== Playoffs ===
Year	Team	GP	GS	MPG	FG%	3P%	FT%	RPG	APG	SPG	BPG	PPG
1972–73	Chicago	1	-	1.0	.000	-	.000	0.0	0.0	-	-	0.0
1973–74	Chicago	2	-	3.0	.000	-	.000	0.5	0.0	0.0	0.0	0.0
1974–75	Chicago	**12**	-	**11.9**	**.375**	-	**.500**	**2.4**	**0.3**	**0.3**	**0.3**	**3.7**
1975–76	Cleveland	4	-	1.3	.000	-	**.500**	0.0	0.0	0.0	0.0	0.5
Career		19	-	8.2	.350	-	.500	1.6	0.2	0.2	0.2	2.4
