= Tom Boerwinkle =

American basketball player (1945–2013)

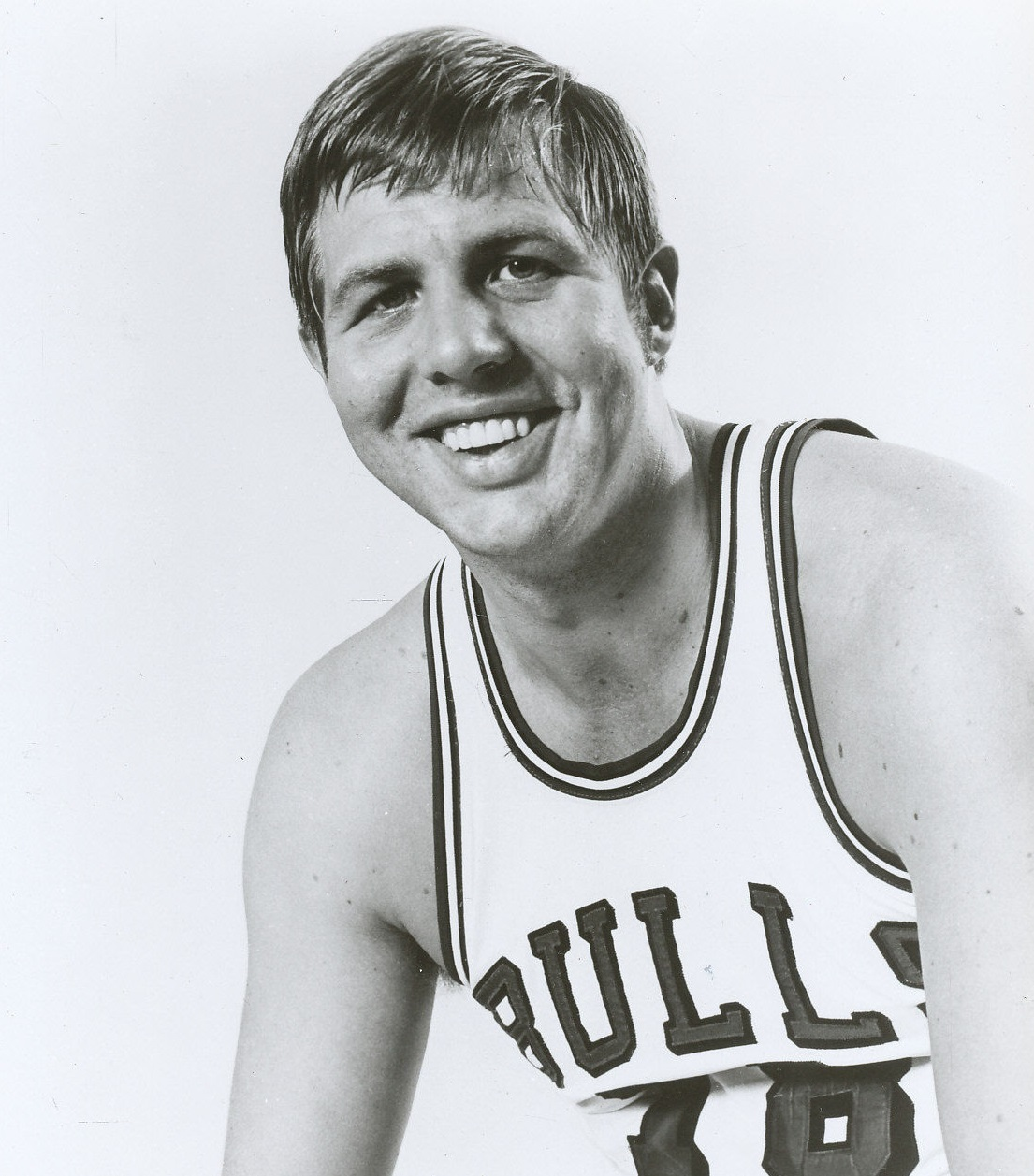
- Boerwinkle with the Chicago Bulls in 1969

Personal information
- Born: August 23, 1945 Independence, Ohio, U.S.
- Died: March 26, 2013 (aged 67) Willowbrook, Illinois, U.S.
- Listed height: 7 ft 0 in (2.13 m)
- Listed weight: 265 lb (120 kg)

Career information
- High school: Millersburg Military Institute (Millersburg, Kentucky)
- College: Tennessee (1965–1968)
- NBA draft: 1968: 1st round, 4th overall pick
- Drafted by: Chicago Bulls
- Playing career: 1968–1978
- Position: Center
- Number: 18

Career history
- 1968–1978: Chicago Bulls

Career highlights
- 2× First-team All-SEC (1967, 1968)

Career statistics
- Points: 4,596 (7.2 ppg)
- Rebounds: 5,745 (9.0 rpg)
- Assists: 2,007 (3.2 apg)
- Stats at NBA.com
- Stats at Basketball Reference

Thomas F. Boerwinkle (August 23, 1945 – March 26, 2013) was an American National Basketball Association (NBA) center who spent his entire career with the Chicago Bulls.

== Early life ==
Tom Boerwinkle was born in Independence, Ohio, one of three children of John and Katherine Boerwinkle. John Boerwinkle, an engineer for an oil refinery, was a native of Cleveland and the son of Dutch immigrants who had come to the United States in 1890.

He attended high school at Millersburg Military Institute, a now-defunct prep school in Millersburg, Kentucky, later known as Forest Hill Military Academy.

== College career ==
Boerwinkle played for the University of Tennessee and helped the team win the 1967 Southeastern Conference championship. The next year, he was named a Helms Foundation first-team all-American.

In his junior and senior seasons, he averaged a double-double each season—10.2 points and 12.2 rebounds his junior season and 11.3 points and 15.2 rebounds his senior season.

== Professional career ==
Boerwinkle was drafted as the fourth pick of the 1968 NBA draft and played with the Bulls until 1978. Although largely unappreciated during his playing days, Boerwinkle was a very efficient player, using his brawny seven-foot frame to grab rebounds and set picks while teammates like Jerry Sloan, Chet Walker and Bob Love did most of the scoring.

On January 8, 1970, Boerwinkle set a Bulls record by grabbing 37 rebounds against the Phoenix Suns. He retired with career totals of 4,596 points, 5,745 rebounds, and 2,007 assists. Boerwinkle also had five triple doubles in his career.

== Later life ==
Boerwinkle later served as a radio color analyst for the Bulls. He was a longtime co-owner of the Olympic Oil Co. in Stickney, Illinois.

Boerwinkle died on March 26, 2013, in Willowbrook, Illinois, after struggling with myelodysplastic syndrome, a form of leukemia.

Upon his death, longtime Bulls teammate Bob Love said, "He was a great teammate with a heart of gold. And I always tell people: Half of my baskets came from him. He's one of the best-passing big men of all-time." Hall of Fame center and Bulls teammate Artis Gilmore said, "He understood his role extremely well. He had a very big body and he absorbed a lot of space. With those behind-the-back and over-the-head passes, he was very good. He understood the game and he played intelligent basketball."

He was survived by his wife of 41 years, Linda, son Jeff and daughter Gretchen.

== Career statistics ==
Legend
GP	Games played	GS	Games started	MPG	Minutes per game
FG%	Field goal percentage	3P%	3-point field goal percentage	FT%	Free throw percentage
RPG	Rebounds per game	APG	Assists per game	SPG	Steals per game
BPG	Blocks per game	PPG	Points per game	**Bold**	Career high

=== NBA ===
==== Regular season ====
NBA regular season playing statistics
Year	Team	GP	MPG	FG%	FT%	RPG	APG	SPG	BPG	PPG
1968–69	Chicago	80	**29.6**	.383	.653	11.1	2.2	–	–	9.8
1969–70	Chicago	81	28.8	.449	.664	12.5	2.8	–	–	10.4
1970–71	Chicago	**82**	28.9	.485	.724	**13.8**	4.8	–	–	**10.8**
1971–72	Chicago	80	25.3	.438	.656	11.2	3.5	–	–	7.0
1972–73	Chicago	8	22.0	.375	.600	6.8	**5.0**	–	–	3.8
1973–74	Chicago	46	13.1	.487	.700	4.6	2.0	.3	.4	3.4
1974–75	Chicago	80	14.7	.487	.768	4.8	3.4	.4	.6	4.2
1975–76	Chicago	74	27.6	**.500**	.667	**10.7**	3.8	**.6**	**.7**	8.8
1976–77	Chicago	**82**	13.0	.491	.540	3.8	2.3	.2	.2	3.7
1977–78	Chicago	22	10.3	.460	**.769**	2.7	2.0	.1	.2	2.5
Career		635	22.7	.453	.675	9.0	3.2	.4	.5	7.2

==== Playoffs ====
NBA playoff playing statistics
Year	Team	GP	MPG	FG%	FT%	RPG	APG	SPG	BPG	PPG
1970	Chicago	5	**35.4**	.506	.615	**14.4**	3.2	–	–	**17.6**
1971	Chicago	7	24.1	.463	.714	9.6	**4.4**	–	–	6.1
1972	Chicago	1	8.0	.000	–	6.0	3.0	–	–	.0
1973	Chicago	4	7.5	**.667**	**1.000**	2.3	2.8	–	–	2.3
1974	Chicago	2	3.5	.000	**1.000**	.5	.0	.0	.0	1.0
1975	Chicago	**13**	29.0	.439	.800	12.7	4.2	**.3**	**.8**	8.2
1977	Chicago	3	5.7	.200	–	3.3	2.3	.0	.3	.7
Career		35	22.4	.459	.750	9.4	3.5	.2	.6	7.1

== See also ==
- List of NBA players who have spent their entire career with one franchise
