= Bobby Wilson (basketball, born 1951) =

American basketball player (born 1951)

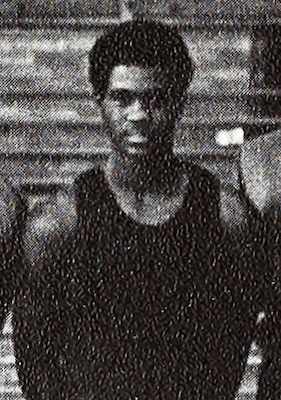
- Wilson in 1969

Personal information
- Born: January 15, 1951 (age 75) Indianapolis, Indiana, U.S.
- Listed height: 6 ft 3 in (1.91 m)
- Listed weight: 175 lb (79 kg)

Career information
- High school: Shortridge (Indianapolis, Indiana)
- College: Pasadena CC (1970–1971); Northeastern JC (1971–1972); Wichita State (1972–1974)
- NBA draft: 1974: 3rd round, 52nd overall pick
- Drafted by: Chicago Bulls
- Playing career: 1974–1986
- Position: Shooting guard
- Number: 34, 42, 7
- Coaching career: 1979–1981

Career history

Playing
- 1974–1976: Chicago Bulls
- 1977: Boston Celtics
- 1977: Indiana Pacers
- 1978: Kentucky Stallions
- 1979–1981: Hawaii / Billings Volcanos
- 1984–1985: Fortitudo Bologna
- 1985–1986: Grenoble

Coaching
- 1979–1981: Hawaii / Billings Volcanos

Career highlights
- All-CBA Second Team (1980); CBA Newcomer of the Year (1980)
- Stats at NBA.com
- Stats at Basketball Reference

Robert E. Wilson (born January 15, 1951) is an American former professional basketball player. He played four seasons in the National Basketball Association (NBA) with the Chicago Bulls, Boston Celtics and Indiana Pacers.

Born in Indianapolis, Indiana, Wilson attended Wichita State University and Pasadena Community College and was selected by the Chicago Bulls with the 16th pick of the 3rd round in the 1974 NBA draft. He was also drafted by the Memphis Tams in the 1974 ABA Draft.

Wilson played for the Hawaii / Billings Volcanos in the Continental Basketball Association (CBA) from 1979 to 1981. He was selected as the CBA Newcomer of the Year and named to the All-CBA Second Team in 1980. Wilson also served as head coach for a combined 37 games across the two seasons and accumulated a 16–21 record.

== Career statistics ==
Legend
GP	Games played	GS	Games started	MPG	Minutes per game
FG%	Field goal percentage	3P%	3-point field goal percentage	FT%	Free throw percentage
RPG	Rebounds per game	APG	Assists per game	SPG	Steals per game
BPG	Blocks per game	PPG	Points per game	**Bold**	Career high

=== NBA ===
==== Regular season ====
Year	Team	GP	GS	MPG	FG%	FT%	RPG	APG	SPG	BPG	PPG
1974–75	Chicago	48	1	8.9	**.511**	.793	1.1	.8	**.5**	.0	5.8
1975–76	Chicago	**58**	**10**	**14.8**	.403	.741	**1.6**	**.9**	.4	.0	**7.5**
1976–77	Boston	25		5.2	.322	**.846**	.4	.6	.1	.0	2.0
1977–78	Indiana	12		7.2	.389	.667	1.0	.7	.2	**.1**	2.5
Career		143	11	10.5	.426	.773	1.2	.8	.4	.0	5.5

==== Playoffs ====
Year	Team	GP	MPG	FG%	FT%	RPG	APG	SPG	BPG	PPG
1975	Chicago	10	9.3	.415	.833	1.1	.4	.4	.0	4.4
