= 1973–74 Chicago Bulls season =

NBA professional basketball team season

- Head coach: Dick Motta
- General manager: Dick Motta
- Owner(s): Arthur Wirtz and Jonathan Kovler
- Arena: Chicago Stadium

Results
- Record: 54–28 (.659)
- Place: Division: 2nd (Midwest); Conference: 3rd (Western)
- Playoff finish: Conference finals (lost to Bucks 0–4)
- Stats at Basketball Reference

Local media
- Television: WSNS-TV (Andy Musser, Dick Gonski)
- Radio: WIND (Jim Durham, Bill Berg)

The 1973–74 Chicago Bulls season was the Bulls' eighth season in the NBA.

== Roster ==
1973–74 Chicago Bulls roster
Players

Pos.	No.	Player	Height	Weight	DOB	From
G	12–21	Rick Adelman	6 ft 1 in (1.85 m)	175 lb (79 kg)	1946-06-16	Loyola Marymount
C	20	Dennis Awtrey	6 ft 10 in (2.08 m)	235 lb (107 kg)	1948-02-22	Santa Clara
C	18	Tom Boerwinkle	7 ft 0 in (2.13 m)	265 lb (120 kg)	1945-08-23	Tennessee
F	23	Rowland Garrett	6 ft 6 in (1.98 m)	210 lb (95 kg)	1950-07-16	Florida State
F	42	John Hummer	6 ft 9 in (2.06 m)	230 lb (104 kg)	1948-05-04	Princeton
F	10	Bob Love	6 ft 8 in (2.03 m)	215 lb (98 kg)	1942-12-08	Southern
F	54	Howard Porter	6 ft 8 in (2.03 m)	220 lb (100 kg)	1948-08-31	Villanova
C	14	Clifford Ray	6 ft 9 in (2.06 m)	230 lb (104 kg)	1949-01-21	Oklahoma
G/F	4	Jerry Sloan	6 ft 5 in (1.96 m)	195 lb (88 kg)	1942-03-28	Evansville
G	2	Norm Van Lier	6 ft 1 in (1.85 m)	173 lb (78 kg)	1947-04-01	Saint Francis (PA)
F	25	Chet Walker	6 ft 6 in (1.98 m)	212 lb (96 kg)	1940-02-22	Bradley
G	8	Bob Weiss	6 ft 2 in (1.88 m)	180 lb (82 kg)	1942-05-07	Penn State

Coaches
Head coach
- Dick Motta

Legend
- (DP) Unsigned draft pick
- (FA) Free agent
- (S) Suspended
- Injured

Roster
Updated: February 13, 1974

== Regular season ==
=== Season standings ===
Midwest Division	W	L	PCT	GB	Home	Road	Neutral	Div
y-Milwaukee Bucks	59	23	.720	–	31–7	24–16	4–0	14–6
x-Chicago Bulls	54	28	.659	5	32–9	21–19	1–0	13–7
x-Detroit Pistons	52	30	.634	7	29–12	23–17	0–1	9–11
Kansas City–Omaha Kings	33	49	.402	26	20–21	13–28	–	4–16

#	Western Conference				
#	Team	W	L	PCT	GB
1	z-Milwaukee Bucks	59	23	.720	–
2	x-Chicago Bulls	54	28	.659	5
3	x-Detroit Pistons	52	30	.634	7
4	y-Los Angeles Lakers	47	35	.573	12
5	Golden State Warriors	44	38	.537	15
6	Seattle SuperSonics	36	46	.439	23
7	Kansas City–Omaha Kings	33	49	.402	26
8	Phoenix Suns	30	52	.366	29
9	Portland Trail Blazers	27	55	.329	32

z – clinched division title
y – clinched division title
x – clinched playoff spot

=== Game log ===
1973–74 game log
#	Date	Opponent	Score	High points	Record
1	October 9	Los Angeles	117–97	Chet Walker (26)	0–1
2	October 10	@ Kansas City–Omaha	105–90	Chet Walker (29)	1–1
3	October 12	@ Kansas City–Omaha	84–88	Chet Walker (24)	1–2
4	October 13	Detroit	94–101	Sloan, Walker (18)	2–2
5	October 19	Capital	103–117	Bob Love (33)	3–2
6	October 20	@ New York	85–69	Bob Love (25)	4–2
7	October 21	@ Capital	107–99	Chet Walker (30)	5–2
8	October 26	Houston	113–121	Chet Walker (30)	6–2
9	October 27	@ Houston	102–92	Chet Walker (20)	7–2
10	November 2	Buffalo	97–107	Love, Weiss (20)	8–2
11	November 3	Cleveland	94–105	Chet Walker (32)	9–2
12	November 4	N Buffalo	101–95 (OT)	Chet Walker (29)	10–2
13	November 8	@ Golden State	112–111	Bob Love (31)	11–2
14	November 10	@ Portland	106–104	Chet Walker (28)	12–2
15	November 11	@ Seattle	116–98	Norm Van Lier (30)	13–2
16	November 13	@ Phoenix	108–116	Bob Love (32)	13–3
17	November 16	@ Los Angeles	102–118	Bob Love (29)	13–4
18	November 18	@ Detroit	104–102	Chet Walker (28)	14–4
19	November 20	Portland	101–106	Chet Walker (30)	15–4
20	November 23	Phoenix	99–94	Bob Love (24)	15–5
21	November 24	Detroit	112–114 (OT)	Bob Love (31)	16–5
22	November 27	Golden State	117–123	Chet Walker (39)	17–5
23	November 28	@ Philadelphia	96–101	Chet Walker (30)	17–6
24	November 30	New York	97–115	Bob Love (24)	18–6
25	December 1	@ Boston	98–120	Jerry Sloan (25)	18–7
26	December 4	Seattle	107–130	Love, Van Lier (27)	19–7
27	December 6	Philadelphia	98–103	Chet Walker (27)	20–7
28	December 7	@ Cleveland	96–91	Jerry Sloan (19)	21–7
29	December 8	Boston	95–112	Bob Love (28)	22–7
30	December 11	Kansas City–Omaha	104–105	Bob Love (23)	23–7
31	December 13	@ Milwaukee	97–94	Chet Walker (26)	24–7
32	December 14	Los Angeles	100–97	Bob Love (25)	24–8
33	December 15	Houston	100–104	Norm Van Lier (30)	25–8
34	December 18	Seattle	93–92	Bob Love (19)	25–9
35	December 19	@ Detroit	87–89	Bob Love (27)	25–10
36	December 22	Golden State	86–110	Bob Love (32)	26–10
37	December 26	@ Capital	81–82	Chet Walker (22)	26–11
38	December 28	Atlanta	94–118	Love, Weiss (18)	27–11
39	December 29	Detroit	103–108	Bob Love (30)	28–11
40	December 30	@ Portland	92–99	Chet Walker (31)	28–12
41	January 1	@ Golden State	91–80	Bob Love (39)	29–12
42	January 4	@ Seattle	101–103 (OT)	Chet Walker (33)	29–13
43	January 6	Phoenix	116–120 (OT)	Bob Love (33)	30–13
44	January 8	New York	108–80	Bob Love (18)	30–14
45	January 9	@ Boston	89–106	Bob Love (28)	30–15
46	January 10	@ Atlanta	116–104	Chet Walker (29)	31–15
47	January 12	Milwaukee	101–82	Howard Porter (17)	31–16
48	January 13	@ Milwaukee	94–124	Bob Love (24)	31–17
49	January 18	@ Detroit	95–113	Chet Walker (25)	31–18
50	January 20	Portland	97–99	Chet Walker (22)	32–18
51	January 22	Atlanta	89–102	Bob Love (28)	33–18
52	January 25	Seattle	99–104	Bob Love (34)	34–18
53	January 27	Detroit	91–109	Love, Porter (21)	35–18
54	January 30	Capital	94–103	Bob Love (20)	36–18
55	February 1	Kansas City–Omaha	88–99	Bob Love (29)	37–18
56	February 2	@ Philadelphia	105–89	Bob Love (27)	38–18
57	February 3	@ Cleveland	108–94	Jerry Sloan (25)	39–18
58	February 5	Boston	98–100	Chet Walker (22)	40–18
59	February 6	@ Kansas City–Omaha	112–95	Bob Love (29)	41–18
60	February 8	@ Buffalo	101–106	Love, Walker (20)	41–19
61	February 10	Los Angeles	86–96	Bob Love (30)	42–19
62	February 12	Milwaukee	81–93	Bob Love (34)	43–19
63	February 13	@ New York	80–89	Norm Van Lier (19)	43–20
64	February 15	@ Milwaukee	92–90	Bob Love (24)	44–20
65	February 17	Golden State	108–105	Howard Porter (24)	44–21
66	February 19	Phoenix	96–130	Porter, Walker (25)	45–21
67	February 22	Portland	100–117	Bob Love (29)	46–21
68	February 24	@ Los Angeles	90–100	Bob Love (23)	46–22
69	February 27	@ Phoenix	107–95	Howard Porter (23)	47–22
70	March 1	@ Portland	91–95	Love, Walker (21)	47–23
71	March 2	@ Golden State	88–103	Chet Walker (28)	47–24
72	March 5	@ Phoenix	111–91	Norm Van Lier (22)	48–24
73	March 6	@ Houston	105–93	Bob Love (43)	49–24
74	March 9	@ Atlanta	99–106	Clifford Ray (24)	49–25
75	March 12	Kansas City–Omaha	93–91	Bob Love (31)	49–26
76	March 15	Buffalo	97–114	Chet Walker (22)	50–26
77	March 17	Milwaukee	107–82	Howard Porter (22)	50–27
78	March 19	Philadelphia	94–103	Jerry Sloan (22)	51–27
79	March 20	@ Kansas City–Omaha	87–86	Norm Van Lier (25)	52–27
80	March 22	@ Los Angeles	93–99	Howard Porter (21)	52–28
81	March 24	@ Seattle	122–113	Chet Walker (25)	53–28
82	March 26	Cleveland	98–104	Norm Van Lier (25)	54–28

=== Playoffs ===
1974 playoff game log
Conference semifinals: 4–3 (home: 3–1; road: 1–2)

Game	Date	Team	Score	High points	High rebounds	High assists	Location Attendance	Series
1	March 30	Detroit	L 88–97	Jerry Sloan (24)	Sloan, Ray (10)	Norm Van Lier (6)	Chicago Stadium; 10,711	0–1
2	April 1	@ Detroit	W 108–103	Bob Love (38)	Clifford Ray (11)	Norm Van Lier (9)	Cobo Arena; 11,499	1–1
3	April 5	Detroit	W 84–83	Chet Walker (21)	Jerry Sloan (14)	Norm Van Lier (5)	Chicago Stadium; 17,634	2–1
4	April 7	@ Detroit	L 87–102	Bob Love (23)	Clifford Ray (9)	Norm Van Lier (9)	Cobo Arena; 11,287	2–2
5	April 9	Detroit	W 98–94	Bob Love (32)	Jerry Sloan (17)	Norm Van Lier (4)	Chicago Stadium; 14,236	3–2
6	April 11	@ Detroit	L 88–92	Chet Walker (33)	Clifford Ray (15)	Norm Van Lier (10)	Cobo Arena; 11,134	3–3
7	April 13	Detroit	W 96–94	Chet Walker (26)	Clifford Ray (15)	Bob Weiss (5)	Chicago Stadium; 13,133	4–3

Conference finals: 0–4 (home: 0–2; road: 0–2)

Game	Date	Team	Score	High points	High rebounds	High assists	Location Attendance	Series
1	April 16	@ Milwaukee	L 85–101	Norm Van Lier (26)	Bob Love (10)	Norm Van Lier (10)	Milwaukee Arena; 10,938	0–1
2	April 18	Milwaukee	L 111–113	Norm Van Lier (27)	Clifford Ray (15)	Norm Van Lier (7)	Chicago Stadium; 17,787	0–2
3	April 20	@ Milwaukee	L 90–113	Bob Love (30)	Clifford Ray (15)	Clifford Ray (6)	Milwaukee Arena; 10,938	0–3
4	April 22	Milwaukee	L 99–115	Bob Love (32)	Love, Ray (8)	Norm Van Lier (7)	Chicago Stadium; 12,762	0–4

1974 schedule

== Player statistics ==
Legend
GP	Games played	GS	Games started	MPG	Minutes per game
FG%	Field-goal percentage	3P%	3-point field-goal percentage	FT%	Free-throw percentage
RPG	Rebounds per game	APG	Assists per game	SPG	Steals per game
BPG	Blocks per game	PPG	Points per game

=== Regular season ===
Player	GP	GS	MPG	FG%	3P%	FT%	RPG	APG	SPG	BPG	PPG

=== Playoffs ===
Player	GP	GS	MPG	FG%	3P%	FT%	RPG	APG	SPG	BPG	PPG

== Awards and records ==
- Norm Van Lier, All-NBA Second Team
- Jerry Sloan, NBA All-Defensive First Team
- Norm Van Lier, NBA All-Defensive First Team
- Bob Love, NBA All-Defensive Second Team
- Chet Walker, NBA All-Star Game
- Norm Van Lier, NBA All-Star Game
