= 1974–75 Chicago Bulls season =

NBA professional basketball team season

- Division champions
- Head coach: Dick Motta
- General manager: Dick Motta
- Owner(s): Arthur Wirtz and Jonathan Kovler
- Arena: Chicago Stadium

Results
- Record: 47–35 (.573)
- Place: Division: 1st (Midwest); Conference: 2nd (Western)
- Playoff finish: Conference finals (lost to Warriors 3–4)
- Stats at Basketball Reference

Local media
- Television: WSNS-TV (Andy Musser, Dick Gonski)
- Radio: WIND (Jim Durham, Bill Berg)

The 1974–75 Chicago Bulls season was the Bulls' ninth season in the NBA. The season saw the Bulls clinch the Midwest Division championship, their first title of any kind, and the only one prior to the dynasty years of the 1990s.

== Roster ==
1974–75 Chicago Bulls roster
Players

Pos.	No.	Player	Height	Weight	DOB	From
G	5	Leon Benbow	6 ft 4 in (1.93 m)	185 lb (84 kg)	1950-07-23	Jacksonville
F	35	John Block	6 ft 9 in (2.06 m)	207 lb (94 kg)	1944-04-16	USC
C	18	Tom Boerwinkle	7 ft 0 in (2.13 m)	265 lb (120 kg)	1945-08-23	Tennessee
F	23	Rowland Garrett	6 ft 6 in (1.98 m)	210 lb (95 kg)	1950-07-16	Florida State
G	14	Matt Guokas	6 ft 5 in (1.96 m)	175 lb (79 kg)	1944-02-25	Saint Joseph's
F	8	Mickey Johnson	6 ft 10 in (2.08 m)	190 lb (86 kg)	1952-08-31	Aurora
F	10	Bob Love	6 ft 8 in (2.03 m)	215 lb (98 kg)	1942-12-08	Southern
G/F	4	Jerry Sloan	6 ft 5 in (1.96 m)	195 lb (88 kg)	1942-03-28	Evansville
C	42	Nate Thurmond	6 ft 11 in (2.11 m)	225 lb (102 kg)	1941-07-25	Bowling Green
G	2	Norm Van Lier	6 ft 1 in (1.85 m)	173 lb (78 kg)	1947-04-01	Saint Francis (PA)
F	25	Chet Walker	6 ft 6 in (1.98 m)	212 lb (96 kg)	1940-02-22	Bradley
G	34	Bobby Wilson	6 ft 3 in (1.91 m)	175 lb (79 kg)	1951-01-15	Wichita State

Coaches
Head coach
- Dick Motta
Assistant(s)
- Ed Badger

Legend
- (DP) Unsigned draft pick
- (FA) Free agent
- (S) Suspended
- Injured

Roster
Updated: November 27, 1974

== Regular season ==
=== Season standings ===
Midwest Division	W	L	PCT	GB	Home	Road	Div
y-Chicago Bulls	47	35	.573	–	29–12	18–23	11–15
x-Kansas City–Omaha Kings	44	38	.537	3	29–12	15–26	17–9
x-Detroit Pistons	40	42	.488	7	26–15	14–27	10–16
Milwaukee Bucks	38	44	.463	9	25–16	13–28	14–12

#	Western Conference				
#	Team	W	L	PCT	GB
1	z-Golden State Warriors	48	34	.585	–
2	y-Chicago Bulls	47	35	.573	1
3	x-Kansas City–Omaha Kings	44	38	.537	4
4	x-Seattle SuperSonics	43	39	.524	5
5	x-Detroit Pistons	40	42	.488	8
6	Portland Trail Blazers	38	44	.463	10
6	Milwaukee Bucks	38	44	.463	10
8	Phoenix Suns	32	50	.390	16
9	Los Angeles Lakers	30	52	.366	18

z – clinched division title
y – clinched division title
x – clinched playoff spot

=== Season schedule ===
1974–75 game log
Total: 47–35 (home: 29–12; road: 18–23)
October: 3–5 (home: 2–2; road: 1–3)

Game	Date	Team	Score	High points	High rebounds	High assists	Location Attendance	Record
1	October 18	Atlanta	115–120 (OT)	Chet Walker (25)	Nate Thurmond (14)	Nate Thurmond (13)	Chicago Stadium; 7,351	1–0
2	October 19	Milwaukee	70–87	Chet Walker (18)	Nate Thurmond (20)	Nate Thurmond (5)	Chicago Stadium; 9,031	2–0
3	October 22	@ Milwaukee	90–92	Chet Walker (21)	Nate Thurmond (14)	Chet Walker (5)	MECCA Arena; 9,439	2–1
4	October 23	@ Kansas City–Omaha	98–99	Chet Walker (24)	Nate Thurmond (12)	Tom Boerwinkle (5)	Omaha Civic Auditorium; 4,759	2–2
5	October 25	Kansas City–Omaha	112–91	Bobby Wilson (18)	Nate Thurmond (17)	Sloan, Walker, Wilson (3)	Chicago Stadium; 6,942	2–3
6	October 26	@ Buffalo	104–105	Jerry Sloan (24)	Nate Thurmond (11)	Nate Thurmond (10)	Buffalo Memorial Auditorium; 12,767	2–4
7	October 29	Washington	96–80	Chet Walker (17)	Nate Thurmond (14)	Adelman, Boerwinkle (4)	Chicago Stadium; 4,413	2–5
8	October 30	@ Boston	105–104	Chet Walker (26)	Bill Hewitt (15)	Rick Adelman (7)	Boston Garden; 7,964	3–5

November: 7–6 (home: 1–1; road: 6–5)

Game	Date	Team	Score	High points	High rebounds	High assists	Location Attendance	Record
9	November 2	@ New York	95–90	Chet Walker (20)	Nate Thurmond (13)	Bill Hewitt (5)	Madison Square Garden; 19,543	4–5
10	November 3	@ Kansas City–Omaha	86–79	Chet Walker (26)	Nate Thurmond (14)	Rick Adelman (5)	Kemper Arena; 4,430	5–5
11	November 6	@ Philadelphia	90–105	Mickey Johnson (13)	Sloan, Thurmond (8)	Sloan, Thurmond (4)	The Spectrum; 5,287	5–6
12	November 9	@ Washington	89–96	Jerry Sloan (24)	Nate Thurmond (11)	Norm Van Lier (6)	Capital Centre; 8,083	5–7
13	November 12	@ New Orleans	88–79	Chet Walker (30)	Nate Thurmond (14)	Norm Van Lier (7)	Municipal Auditorium; 4,412	6–7
14	November 14	@ Houston	96–105	Chet Walker (33)	Jerry Sloan (8)	Thurmond, Van Lier (9)	Hofheinz Pavilion; 2,523	6–8
15	November 15	@ Phoenix	102–95	Chet Walker (27)	John Block (12)	Nate Thurmond (8)	Arizona Veterans Memorial Coliseum; 7,071	7–8
16	November 17	@ Los Angeles	96–76	Chet Walker (23)	Nate Thurmond (18)	Norm Van Lier (12)	The Forum; 12,417	8–8
17	November 19	@ Portland	92–98 (OT)	Nate Thurmond (25)	Nate Thurmond (13)	Nate Thurmond (7)	Memorial Coliseum; 10,897	8–9
18	November 22	@ Seattle	93–89	Block, Van Lier (24)	Block, Thurmond (14)	Norm Van Lier (6)	Seattle Center Coliseum; 14,082	9–9
19	November 24	Buffalo	89–91	Chet Walker (27)	Nate Thurmond (18)	Nate Thurmond (9)	Chicago Stadium; 13,346	10–9
20	November 26	Kansas City–Omaha	93–90	John Block (29)	Nate Thurmond (10)	Norm Van Lier (14)	Chicago Stadium; 7,321	10–10
21	November 30	@ Milwaukee	99–101 (2OT)	Chet Walker (25)	Norm Van Lier (9)	Thurmond, Van Lier (6)	MECCA Arena; 10,938	10–11

December: 7–6 (home: 5–4; road: 2–2)

Game	Date	Team	Score	High points	High rebounds	High assists	Location Attendance	Record
22	December 3	Portland	91–96	Love, Van Lier (18)	Nate Thurmond (14)	Nate Thurmond (9)	Chicago Stadium; 7,241	11–11
23	December 6	Milwaukee	99–96	John Block (22)	John Block (16)	Norm Van Lier (7)	Chicago Stadium; 17,107	11–12
24	December 10	Boston	107–89	Jerry Sloan (20)	Nate Thurmond (12)	Guokas, Love (4)	Chicago Stadium; 11,036	11–13
25	December 13	New Orleans	76–109	Block, Walker (21)	Nate Thurmond (11)	Sloan, Thurmond (4)	Chicago Stadium; 5,198	12–13
26	December 17	Seattle	84–87	Chet Walker (21)	Nate Thurmond (15)	Jerry Sloan (6)	Chicago Stadium; 5,591	13–13
27	December 19	@ Atlanta	88–80	Chet Walker (18)	Nate Thurmond (14)	Sloan, Thurmond (5)	Omni Coliseum; 3,043	14–13
28	December 20	Kansas City–Omaha	73–96	Bob Love (30)	Nate Thurmond (14)	Matt Guokas (8)	Chicago Stadium; 5,021	15–13
29	December 21	@ Cleveland	87–74	Bob Love (28)	Sloan, Thurmond (9)	Norm Van Lier (8)	Richfield Coliseum; 6,871	16–13
30	December 23	@ Kansas City–Omaha	87–97	Chet Walker (24)	Jerry Sloan (10)	Norm Van Lier (7)	Kemper Arena; 6,454	16–14
31	December 26	Philadelphia	91–92	Chet Walker (22)	Nate Thurmond (14)	Boerwinkle, Guokas (5)	Chicago Stadium; 9,224	17–14
32	December 27	Los Angeles	105–93	Norm Van Lier (21)	Nate Thurmond (11)	Thurmond, Van Lier (3)	Chicago Stadium; 11,148	17–15
33	December 28	@ Detroit	70–79	John Block (14)	Nate Thurmond (11)	Bob Love (5)	Cobo Arena; 11,015	17–16
34	December 30	Detroit	86–81	Bob Love (18)	Nate Thurmond (11)	Norm Van Lier (7)	Chicago Stadium; 10,846	17–17

January: 11–4 (home: 8–2; road: 3–2)

Game	Date	Team	Score	High points	High rebounds	High assists	Location Attendance	Record
35	January 3	Phoenix	99–126	Bob Love (20)	Boerwinkle, Thurmond (9)	Tom Boerwinkle (10)	Chicago Stadium; 6,047	18–17
36	January 4	Kansas City–Omaha	88–100	Bob Love (25)	Nate Thurmond (15)	Norm Van Lier (9)	Chicago Stadium; 8,771	19–17
37	January 5	@ Milwaukee	95–96	Bob Love (23)	Nate Thurmond (14)	Nate Thurmond (6)	MECCA Arena; 10,938	19–18
38	January 7	Houston	97–106	Bob Love (27)	Nate Thurmond (10)	Norm Van Lier (10)	Chicago Stadium; 4,881	20–18
39	January 10	Atlanta	113–116	Chet Walker (39)	Nate Thurmond (12)	Norm Van Lier (9)	Chicago Stadium; 7,132	21–18
40	January 11	@ Golden State	114–105	Bob Love (31)	Norm Van Lier (13)	Norm Van Lier (9)	Oakland-Alameda County Coliseum Arena; 12,787	22–18
41	January 12	@ Seattle	127–123 (2OT)	Norm Van Lier (42)	Jerry Sloan (10)	Norm Van Lier (9)	Seattle Center Coliseum; 14,082	23–18
42	January 17	Phoenix	115–105	Norm Van Lier (23)	Nate Thurmond (11)	Sloan, Walker (4)	Chicago Stadium; 7,174	23–19
43	January 18	New York	104–91	Chet Walker (24)	Jerry Sloan (10)	Tom Boerwinkle (4)	Chicago Stadium; 17,422	23–20
44	January 21	@ New York	97–94	Bob Love (31)	Nate Thurmond (14)	Nate Thurmond (7)	Madison Square Garden; 19,694	24–20
45	January 24	Seattle	81–86	Chet Walker (21)	Nate Thurmond (13)	Norm Van Lier (6)	Chicago Stadium; 7,107	25–20
46	January 25	Detroit	96–116	Bob Love (23)	Nate Thurmond (9)	Norm Van Lier (8)	Chicago Stadium; 18,720	26–20
47	January 26	@ Detroit	93–102 (OT)	Chet Walker (23)	Jerry Sloan (10)	Norm Van Lier (9)	Cobo Arena; 10,210	26–21
48	January 28	Cleveland	97–125	Bob Love (37)	Nate Thurmond (13)	Nate Thurmond (9)	Chicago Stadium; 5,210	27–21
49	January 31	Golden State	103–127	Bob Love (34)	Garrett, Thurmond (10)	Tom Boerwinkle (8)	Chicago Stadium; 13,208	28–21

February: 11–2 (home: 8–0; road: 3–2)

Game	Date	Team	Score	High points	High rebounds	High assists	Location Attendance	Record
50	February 2	Washington	80–97	Bob Love (24)	Nate Thurmond (17)	Norm Van Lier (8)	Chicago Stadium; 10,885	29–21
51	February 4	Portland	90–102	Bob Love (38)	Nate Thurmond (20)	Norm Van Lier (7)	Chicago Stadium; 8,014	30–21
52	February 7	Detroit	83–95	Chet Walker (23)	Love, Sloan (7)	Norm Van Lier (11)	Chicago Stadium; 18,836	31–21
53	February 9	@ Philadelphia	97–109	Chet Walker (25)	Nate Thurmond (8)	Norm Van Lier (5)	The Spectrum; 6,370	31–22
54	February 11	New York	84–101	Bob Love (39)	Nate Thurmond (13)	Norm Van Lier (8)	Chicago Stadium; 12,317	32–22
55	February 12	@ Detroit	103–93	Norm Van Lier (26)	Norm Van Lier (8)	Tom Boerwinkle (6)	Cobo Arena; 10,706	33–22
56	February 14	Golden State	87–105	Bob Love (29)	Nate Thurmond (17)	Norm Van Lier (6)	Chicago Stadium; 10,126	34–22
57	February 16	Buffalo	109–114	Bob Love (31)	Nate Thurmond (14)	Norm Van Lier (7)	Chicago Stadium; 15,972	35–22
58	February 18	Los Angeles	105–128	Bob Love (27)	Tom Boerwinkle (20)	Boerwinkle, Van Lier (7)	Chicago Stadium; 10,214	36–22
59	February 21	Milwaukee	85–96	Bob Love (29)	Nate Thurmond (11)	Norm Van Lier (10)	Chicago Stadium; 19,549	37–22
60	February 25	@ New Orleans	120–105	Chet Walker (29)	Nate Thurmond (16)	Boerwinkle, Walker (5)	Municipal Auditorium; 7,024	38–22
61	February 27	@ Atlanta	111–91	Bob Love (31)	Rowland Garrett (13)	Boerwinkle, Van Lier (6)	Omni Coliseum; 3,563	39–22
62	February 28	@ Houston	87–102	Matt Guokas (13)	Tom Boerwinkle (6)	Tom Boerwinkle (4)	Hofheinz Pavilion; 8,475	39–23

March: 5–11 (home: 4–3; road: 1–8)

Game	Date	Team	Score	High points	High rebounds	High assists	Location Attendance	Record
63	March 1	@ Detroit	94–95	Bob Love (23)	Jerry Sloan (8)	Norm Van Lier (9)	Cobo Arena; 10,666	39–24
64	March 4	@ Golden State	102–117	Bob Love (36)	Tom Boerwinkle (11)	Norm Van Lier (6)	Oakland-Alameda County Coliseum Arena; 9,079	39–25
65	March 6	@ Phoenix	65–88	Norm Van Lier (14)	Nate Thurmond (10)	Tom Boerwinkle (4)	Arizona Veterans Memorial Coliseum; 7,683	39–26
66	March 7	@ Los Angeles	89–87	Norm Van Lier (24)	Nate Thurmond (14)	Tom Boerwinkle (7)	The Forum; 11,116	40–26
67	March 8	@ Portland	82–88	Bob Love (21)	Nate Thurmond (15)	Guokas, Van Lier (5)	Memorial Coliseum; 11,744	40–27
68	March 11	Boston	121–115 (OT)	Love, Van Lier (28)	Nate Thurmond (14)	Boerwinkle, Thurmond (5)	Chicago Stadium; 19,121	40–28
69	March 14	Detroit	94–97	Norm Van Lier (21)	Tom Boeriwnkle (13)	Tom Boerwinkle (6)	Chicago Stadium; 14,377	41–28
70	March 16	Milwaukee	103–90	Bob Love (28)	Tom Boerwinkle (8)	Nate Thurmond (5)	Chicago Stadium; 18,222	41–29
71	March 18	Philadelphia	96–111	Chet Walker (30)	Nate Thurmond (16)	Norm Van Lier (7)	Chicago Stadium; 8,741	42–29
72	March 20	@ Cleveland	83–87	Chet Walker (31)	Nate Thurmond (11)	Nate Thurmond (9)	Richfield Coliseum; 7,491	42–30
73	March 21	Kansas City–Omaha	98–104	Bob Love (28)	Bob Love (13)	Nate Thurmond (7)	Chicago Stadium; 14,792	43–30
74	March 23	@ Kansas City–Omaha	101–103	Bob Love (38)	Bob Love (11)	Norm Van Lier (6)	Kemper Arena; 16,805	43–31
75	March 25	Houston	94–112	Bob Love (29)	Nate Thurmond (11)	Boerwinkle, Guokas, Thurmond (7)	Chicago Stadium; 9,863	44–31
76	March 27	Cleveland	86–83	Chet Walker (18)	Nate Thurmond (12)	Guokas, Love, Van Lier (3)	Chicago Stadium; 10,031	44–32
77	March 28	@ Boston	92–97	Bob Love (26)	Nate Thurmond (12)	Norm Van Lier (5)	Boston Garden; 15,320	44–33
78	March 30	@ Washington	82–94	Bob Love (18)	Rowland Garrett (13)	Tom Boerwinkle (7)	Capital Centre; 10,149	44–34

April: 3–1 (home: 1–0; road: 2–1)

Game	Date	Team	Score	High points	High rebounds	High assists	Location Attendance	Record
79	April 1	@ Buffalo	98–93	Chet Walker (24)	Tom Boerwinkle (11)	Tom Boerwinkle (11)	Buffalo Memorial Auditorium; 12,888	45–34
80	April 2	@ Detroit	89–97	Boerwinkle, Van Lier (17)	Tom Boerwinkle (9)	Tom Boerwinkle (10)	Cobo Arena; 9,336	45–35
81	April 4	New Orleans	87–111	Norm Van Lier (32)	Thurmond, Walker (11)	Norm Van Lier (6)	Chicago Stadium; 11,312	46–35
82	April 6	@ Milwaukee	112–100	Norm Van Lier (24)	Tom Boerwinkle (12)	Tom Boerwinkle (6)	MECCA Arena; 10,938	47–35

Source: www.basketball-reference.com

=== Playoffs ===
1975 playoff game log
Conference semifinals: 4–2 (home: 3–0; road: 1–2)

Game	Date	Team	Score	High points	High rebounds	High assists	Location Attendance	Series
1	April 9	Kansas City–Omaha	W 95–89	Bob Love (38)	Tom Boerwinkle (12)	Tom Boerwinkle (5)	Chicago Stadium; 15,433	1–0
2	April 13	@ Kansas City–Omaha	L 95–102	Chet Walker (20)	Tom Boerwinkle (12)	Tom Boerwinkle (3)	Kemper Arena; 11,378	1–1
3	April 16	Kansas City–Omaha	W 93–90	Bob Love (31)	Tom Boerwinkle (24)	Norm Van Lier (6)	Chicago Stadium; 18,347	2–1
4	April 18	@ Kansas City–Omaha	L 100–104 (OT)	Bob Love (34)	Tom Boerwinkle (17)	Tom Boerwinkle (5)	Kemper Arena; 14,945	2–2
5	April 20	Kansas City–Omaha	W 104–77	Bob Love (30)	Tom Boerwinkle (19)	Tom Boerwinkle (8)	Chicago Stadium; 16,247	3–2
6	April 23	@ Kansas City–Omaha	W 101–89	Bob Love (26)	Tom Boerwinkle (14)	Norm Van Lier (4)	Kemper Arena; 12,445	4–2

Conference finals: 3–4 (home: 2–1; road: 1–3)

Game	Date	Team	Score	High points	High rebounds	High assists	Location Attendance	Series
1	April 27	@ Golden State	L 89–107	Bob Love (37)	Nate Thurmond (7)	Tom Boerwinkle (4)	Oakland–Alameda County Coliseum Arena; 12,787	0–1
2	April 30	Golden State	W 90–89	Chet Walker (28)	Tom Boerwinkle (14)	Tom Boerwinkle (5)	Chicago Stadium; 18,533	1–1
3	May 4	Golden State	W 108–101	Norm Van Lier (35)	Nate Thurmond (12)	Norm Van Lier (9)	Chicago Stadium; 19,128	2–1
4	May 6	@ Golden State	L 106–111	Bob Love (27)	Jerry Sloan (12)	Norm Van Lier (9)	Oakland–Alameda County Coliseum Arena; 12,787	2–2
5	May 8	@ Golden State	W 89–79	Chet Walker (21)	Sloan, Boerwinkle (10)	Van Lier, Boerwinkle (4)	Oakland–Alameda County Coliseum Arena; 12,787	3–2
6	May 11	Golden State	L 72–86	Norm Van Lier (24)	Sloan, Boerwinkle (8)	Nate Thurmond (5)	Chicago Stadium; 19,594	3–3
7	May 14	@ Golden State	L 79–83	Chet Walker (21)	Tom Boerwinkle (16)	Tom Boerwinkle (6)	Oakland–Alameda County Coliseum Arena	3–4

1975 schedule

== Player statistics ==
Legend
GP	Games played	GS	Games started	MPG	Minutes per game
FG%	Field-goal percentage	3P%	3-point field-goal percentage	FT%	Free-throw percentage
RPG	Rebounds per game	APG	Assists per game	SPG	Steals per game
BPG	Blocks per game	PPG	Points per game

=== Regular season ===
Player	GP	GS	MPG	FG%	3P%	FT%	RPG	APG	SPG	BPG	PPG

=== Playoffs ===
Player	GP	GS	MPG	FG%	3P%	FT%	RPG	APG	SPG	BPG	PPG

== Awards and records ==
- Jerry Sloan, NBA All-Defensive First Team
- Norm Van Lier, NBA All-Defensive Second Team
- Bob Love, NBA All-Defensive Second Team
