= Bob Love =

American basketball player (1942–2024)

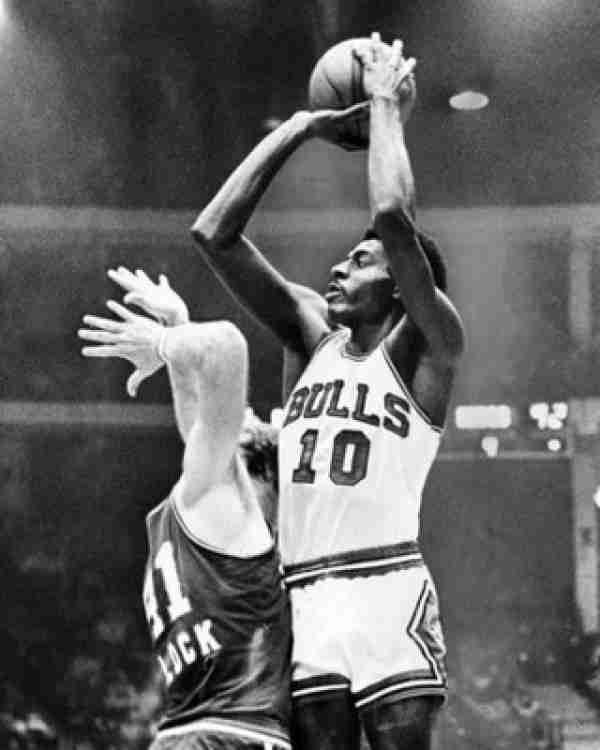
- Love with the Chicago Bulls

Personal information
- Born: December 8, 1942 Bastrop, Louisiana, U.S.
- Died: November 18, 2024 (aged 81) Chicago, Illinois, U.S.
- Listed height: 6 ft 8 in (2.03 m)
- Listed weight: 215 lb (98 kg)

Career information
- High school: Morehouse (Bastrop, Louisiana)
- College: Southern (1961–1965)
- NBA draft: 1965: 4th round, 33rd overall pick
- Drafted by: Cincinnati Royals
- Playing career: 1965–1977
- Position: Small forward
- Number: 21, 9, 10

Career history
- 1965–1966: Trenton Colonials
- 1966–1968: Cincinnati Royals
- 1968: Milwaukee Bucks
- 1968–1976: Chicago Bulls
- 1976–1977: New York Nets
- 1977: Seattle SuperSonics

Career highlights
- 3× NBA All-Star (1971–1973); 2× All-NBA Second Team (1971, 1972); 3× NBA All-Defensive Second Team (1972–1974); No. 10 retired by Chicago Bulls; All-EPBL Second Team (1966); EPBL Rookie of the Year (1966); 2× NAIA All-American (1963, 1965); SWAC Player of the Year (1965); 3× First-team All-SWAC (1963–1965); No. 41 retired by Southern Jaguars

Career NBA statistics
- Points: 13,895 (17.6 ppg)
- Rebounds: 4,653 (5.9 rpg)
- Assists: 1,123 (1.4 apg)
- Stats at NBA.com
- Stats at Basketball Reference

Robert Earl Love (December 8, 1942 – November 18, 2024) was an American professional basketball player who spent the prime of his career with the National Basketball Association's (NBA) Chicago Bulls. He is also remembered for his efforts in striving to overcome a severe stutter that had plagued him for decades; taking him from jobs as a dishwasher and busboy after retiring from the NBA, to ultimately becoming an executive with the Bulls (as a community affairs director and good will ambassador) and Nordstrom (managing health and sanitation for a 70-restaurant chain); and being a motivational speaker to thousands of children.

Love did not become a starter in the NBA until he was 27-years old, with the 1969–70 Chicago Bulls. Over a seven-season period with the Bulls from 1969 to 1976, the ambidextrous Love averaged over 21 points per game in six consecutive seasons, led the Bulls in scoring in six consecutive seasons, was an NBA All-Star three times, second-team All-NBA twice, and a second-team NBA All-Defensive Team selection three times. Love averaged between six and 8.7 rebounds per game during that same time period. He led the Bulls in minutes played in multiple seasons, and is in the top-five Bulls players all-time in career minutes played per game and scoring average. In 47 playoff games with Bulls, Love averaged nearly 44 minutes and 23 points per game. He was a member of the Chicago Bulls Ring of Honor's inaugural class in 2023. He was the second Bulls player to have his number retired.

Love attended Southern University, where he played four years of varsity basketball. He averaged double-doubles as a sophomore (22.6 points and 12.3 rebounds per game), junior (25.6 points and 18 rebounds per game), and as a senior (30.6 points and 18.2 rebounds per game). He was an NAIA All-American as a junior (third-team) and senior (first-team), and was first team All-Southwestern Athletic Conference (SWAC) for three consecutive seasons. He was the selected as the SWAC's most valuable player in 1965. Southern retired his number in 2012.

Love was nicknamed "Butterbean" because of his fondness for the legume in childhood, and the name went with him throughout his life.

== Early life ==
Love was born on December 8, 1942, in Bastrop, Louisiana. He grew up in a two-bedroom shanty, and in the cotton fields of Louisiana, the son of a sharecropper. He was one of 14 children; his mother being only 15-years old when she gave birth to him. Love was eight years old when his mother re-married an ex-Marine, who was abusive and would physically strike the young Love at random. Soon after, Love ran away to live with his grandmother when he was eight years old. When Love's stepfather came to retrieve him, Love recalls his grandmother met the man at her door holding an axe handle, and said "'Get out of here . . . The boy lives here now'". Love suffered from a severe stuttering disability and seldom spoke as a child, fearing to be called on in school where other children would ridicule him. Love reportedly did not meet his biological father until he was 33.

Chicago Tribune columnist, and author, Bob Greene, who covered Love when he was with the Chicago Bulls, later described the nature of Love's speech issues from Greene's own personal experience with Love. After stating that the phrase "stuttering disorder" was inadequate to describe Love's experience, Greene wrote: "that is too bland a term, and does not come close to describing how awful and closed-in Love's world was because he could not speak . . . sitting with another person, trying to talk, it was not unusual for a minute, or even two minutes, to pass as he tried to get out a single word. His mouth would move, his face would contort, frustration and anguish would fill his eyes–and nothing would happen".

As a child, Love's first basketball hoop was made out of a coat hangar, and his first basketball was a pair of socks. Love starred in both basketball and football (as the quarterback) at Morehouse High School (now defunct) in Bastrop. He reportedly led Morehouse to state titles in both sports. He was able to call plays as a quarterback because he did not stutter when he sang, and he would sing the play calls to his teammates in the huddle and at the line of scrimmage. Love was ambidextrous as a scorer in basketball. He was not in the starting basketball lineup as a junior, playing behind future NBA player Lucious Jackson; but became a starter as a senior after Jackson graduated, averaging over 30 points per game. Love had a growth spurt during high school, and was 6 ft 7 in (2.01 m) 180 lb (81.6 kg) when he graduated in 1961. Love was nicknamed "Butterbean" in his boyhood because he was fond of the legume, and the nickname stayed with him throughout his life.

== College career ==
It has been reported that Love's only real collegiate choices were a limited number of HBCU schools, as predominantly white schools were not interested in him at that time. These included Southern University, Grambling, and Texas Southern, which were recruiting him as a football player. Love earned a football scholarship to Southern University (Southern or SU) in Baton Rouge, part of the Southwestern Athletic Conference (SWAC). He was recruited to play quarterback on the school's football by Southern's athletic director, A. W. "Ace" Mumford. However, Love never played a game of football at SU. Instead, while working on campus during the summer before his freshman year, SU basketball coach Dick Mack saw Love playing basketball at the school gym and convinced Love to join the basketball team. By the fourth game of his freshman basketball season, Love became a starter on SU's basketball team.

Love averaged 12.8 points per game as a freshman. He averaged 22.6 points per game and 12.3 rebounds per game as a sophomore (1962–63). As a sophomore, Love was a unanimously selected All-SWAC, and was an honorable mention All-American.

As a junior (1963–64), he averaged 25.6 points per game and 18 rebounds per game. He was named an NAIA third-team All-American, and was again selected All-SWAC. Love was invited to try out for the 1964 U.S. men's Olympic basketball team, though he was not selected.

As a senior (1964–65), Love was named the SWAC's most valuable player. He averaged 30.6 points per game and 18.2 rebounds a game. His 30.6 points per game led the SWAC that year. He was a unanimous first-team NAIA All-American, and was selected All-SWAC for the third consecutive season. He was the first black player to be selected by area sportswriters to the All-Southern team. United Press International named Love to its first-team small college All-America team in 1965. His future Chicago Bulls' teammate Jerry Sloan was also named to the UPI small college first team. The Associated Press (AP) named Love an All-American small college honorable mention in 1965. He was selected to play on a 1965 NAIA All-Star team that toured the United States playing exhibition games against a team from the Soviet Union.

Southern had a 25–5 record that season (1964–65), and Love led the team to the 32-team 1965 NAIA basketball tournament. Southern defeated Indiana Tech in the first round, 94–77. Love had 34 points and 25 rebounds in that game. Southern then defeated Eastern Montana, 97–86, with Love scoring 27 points. Ouachita Baptist upset Southern in the next round. Love had given Southern a 64–61 lead with 28 seconds left in the game, but Ouachita scored a field goal, and then made two free throws with three seconds left in the game to win, 65–64. In his three tournament games, Love had 86 points and 53 rebounds, and was named to the All-Tournament Team.

After playing professional basketball in Trenton, New Jersey in 1965–66, Love returned to Southern to complete his studies. He graduated with a bachelor of science degree in food and nutrition. He became a brother in the Alpha Phi Omega fraternity while at SU.

== Professional career ==
=== Cincinnati Royals, Trenton Colonials, ABA, and Milwaukee Bucks ===
In 1965, the Cincinnati Royals selected the 6 ft 8 in (2.03 m) forward in the fourth round of the 1965 NBA draft, 36th overall. Love was one of the last three players the Royals released before the start of the 1965–66 NBA season. Love spent the 1965–66 season playing in the Eastern Professional Basketball League (EPBL) for the Trenton Colonials, in a 28-game season. Love averaged 24 points, 18.5 rebounds, and two assists per game for the Colonials. He was named the EPBL Rookie of the Year Award. He reportedly earned $50 per game, with no bonus, playing as a rookie in Trenton. He took a part-time job as a maintenance man in a hospital to support himself.

Trenton had a contract with Love for a second season, but the Royals, Baltimore Bullets, and newly created Chicago Bulls were showing an interest in signing Love in the summer of 1966. He rejoined the Royals in 1966, and made the team as a reserve power forward. Love made his NBA debut on October 18, 1966. In 66 games, Love averaged 16.3 minutes, 6.7 points, and 3.9 rebounds per game. His best game of the season was against the San Francisco Warriors in early December, when he played 40 minutes and had 26 points and eight rebounds. He suffered a back injury during the 1966–67 season that required back surgery, and was serious enough that he was concerned it could end his career.

After the season ended, on May 23, 1967, Love signed a contract to play for the New Orleans Buccaneers of the newly formed American Basketball Association. He was the first Royals' player to sign with the new league. Love said at the time that although he had a high quality relationship with the Royals, he agreed to the Buccaneers "'enticing offer'". The Royals threatened litigation to stop Love from joining the Buccaneers. All NBA team's had an option clause in their player contracts forcing a player to stay with a team for a year after a contract ended, even if the player did not agree to the salary terms of the contract imposed upon them. Of the NBA players joining ABA teams, the legal issues involving Love and the Buccaneers were the most difficult for an NBA team because of unique aspects of Louisiana law not found in the other 49 states that prevented any suit directly against the Buccaneers.

Over the summer of 1967, other players ultimately decided not to join the ABA teams with which they had signed contracts, and returned to their NBA teams. Love remained determined to play in New Orleans, near his home, though the Royals kept negotiating for his return. The matter effectively resolved when a court determined in a lawsuit between Rick Barry and the San Francisco Warriors that the NBA's option clause in the contract between Barry and the Warriors was enforceable. Barry either had to return to the Warriors or forego playing for one season if he wanted to join the ABA. The same option clause was at issue in all NBA player contracts. On August 21, Love signed a contract to return to the Royals.

Before his back surgery, Love had relied on his leaping ability as an offensive player. Afterward, he revised his entire offensive game; with new shots and new fake moves, relying more on his mind than body in how to play. Love played in 72 games for the Royals in 1967–68. Still a reserve, he averaged 14.8 minutes, 6.4 points, and 2.9 rebounds per game. The Royals did not protect Love in the May 1968 NBA expansion draft, and Love was selected by the Milwaukee Bucks. Love did well in the Bucks' preseason. He led all Bucks players in a September intrasquad game with 34 points, coach Larry Costello calling Love's shooting "fantastic" (though his defense was lacking like most of the Bucks players). In a preseason game against the Phoenix Suns, he scored five points in overtime to lead the Bucks to victory.

Love played in 14 games for the Bucks during the regular season in 1968. He averaged 7.6 points and 4.6 rebounds per game in only 16.2 minutes per game. Even though Love had averaged 20 points a game in the pre-season, the Bucks told Love he did not have a future with the team because of Love's communication problems due to his severe stuttering. Love asked to be traded. In late November 1968, the Bucks traded Love and Bob Weiss to the Chicago Bulls for Flynn Robinson (the Bulls leading scorer at the time). It is likely that Love's speech impediment was a significant factor in his not becoming a starter early in his career.

== Chicago Bulls ==
Love played 35 games for the Bulls in the 1968–69 season, averaging less than 10 minutes per game of playing time. Among his teammates was Jerry Sloan. The Bulls finished the season 33–49. After that season, Love's career flourished while playing for coach Dick Motta's Bulls (1968 to 1976). Over the following seven seasons (1969 to 1976) Love averaged over 21 points per game for six consecutive seasons, and 19.1 points per game in the seventh season, leading the team in scoring six consecutive seasons. He was a three-time NBA All-Star with the Bulls, a three-time selection for second-team NBA All-Defensive Team, and two-time second-team All-NBA Team selection.

In 1969–70, Love became a full-time starter, playing in all 82 games. He averaged 38.1 minutes, 21 points, and 8.7 rebounds per game. On March 15, 1970, Love had a then career-high 47 points, and 12 rebounds in a game against the Bucks, who had traded him a year earlier. The Bulls had a 39–43 record, and reached the 1970 NBA playoffs, losing in five games to the Atlanta Hawks in the Western Division semifinals. Love averaged 34.4 minutes, 11.8 points, and 9.2 rebounds per game in that series.

On the 1969–70 Bulls team, Love was second in scoring to future Hall of Fame forward Chet Walker, who had joined the Bulls that season. Love and Walker played alongside each other as the Bulls' forwards for six seasons (1969 to 1975). They were often referred as the best, or among the best, forward pairings in the NBA during their careers together with the Bulls. In 1971, future Hall of Fame New York Knicks' forward Dave DeBusschere said that "'Love and Walker are probably the best pair of forwards in the league'".

The following two seasons (1970–71 and 1971–72), Love averaged 25.2 and a career-high 25.8 points per game, appeared in his first two All-Star Games, and earned All-NBA second-team honors both seasons. He scored 16 points in the 1971 NBA All-Star Game. Love was sixth in the NBA in scoring average in 1970–71 and 1971–72. He led the Bulls in scoring in 1970–71 and minutes played (43 minutes per game), and was third on the team in rebounding (8.5 per game). He was fifth in the NBA in minutes played per game. He led the Bulls in scoring and minutes played (39.3) again in 1971–72, and averaged 6.6 rebounds per game. He was named to the second-team NBA All-Defensive Team for 1971–72.

The Bulls reached the Western Conference semifinals again in 1971, losing to the Los Angeles Lakers in seven games. Love led the Bulls in the series in minutes played (47.1) and points per game (26.7), while also averaging 7.3 rebounds per game. He led all NBA players in scoring average and minutes per game in the 1971 NBA playoffs. In 1972, the Bulls were swept 4–0 by the eventual NBA champion Los Angeles Lakers in the Western Conference semifinals; with Love averaging 43.3 minutes, 18.8 points, and 6.8 rebounds per game.

In 1972–73, for a third consecutive season, Love led the Bulls in scoring and appeared in the NBA All-Star Game. He played in all 82 games, averaging 37 minutes, 23.1 points, and 6.5 rebounds per game. The Bulls hosted the 1973 All-Star Game, in which Walker also appeared. The Bulls lost to the Lakers for the third consecutive season in the 1973 Western Conference semifinals, in seven games. Love averaged 44.9 minutes, 23.7 points, 9.6 rebounds, and 3.3 assists per game over that seven game series. He had 38 points, 13 rebounds, and six assists in the Bulls' Game 4, and series tying, 98–94 win. His play in the third quarter kept the Bulls close in the game, and he gave the Bulls a lead with six minutes to play in the fourth quarter. He was sixth in scoring average and seventh in minutes per game in the 1973 NBA playoffs.

Love led the Bulls in scoring (21.8 points per game) for the fourth consecutive season in 1973–74. He played in all 82 games, and averaged a team leading 40.1 minutes per game (10th best in the NBA). He was once again named second-team NBA All-Defensive Team. The Bulls had a 54–28 record and met the Detroit Pistons in the Western Conference semifinals, winning in seven games. Love averaged 44.9 minutes, 23.7 points, 5.1 rebounds, 1.9 assists, and 1.4 steals per game in the series. He had 38 points in the Bulls' Game 2 victory, 32 points in the Game 5 win, and 24 points in the Bulls 96–94 win in Game 7. The Bulls were then swept in the Western Conference finals by the Milwaukee Bucks. Love averaged 43.8 minutes, 21.8 points, 6.8 rebounds, 2.8 assists, and one steal per game in that series. He was sixth in scoring average and minutes per game in the 1974 NBA playoffs.

The 32-year old Love held out for the first two months of the 1974–75 season in a salary dispute with the Bulls, originally joined by teammate Norm Van Lier. Love played in 61 games that season, averaging 39.4 minutes, 22 points, 6.3 rebounds, and 1.7 assists per game; leading the Bulls in scoring average for a fifth consecutive season. He was named to the NBA's second-team All-Defensive Team for the third time in 1975. The Bulls were first in the NBA Western Conference's Midwest Division, with a 47–35 record.

The Bulls won the Western Conference semifinals over the Kansas City–Omaha Kings in six games. Love averaged 45.3 minutes, 30 points, 8.7 rebounds, and 1.3 assists in that series. He scored 30 or more points in four of the first five games, including 38 in Game 1. Love had 30 points and 12 rebounds in Game 5. The Bulls lost the Western Conference finals in seven games to the eventual NBA champion Golden State Warriors. Love averaged 44.4 minutes, 22.3 points, 6.6 rebounds, 1.6 assists, and nearly one steal per game in the series. He was third in points per game in the 1975 playoffs (25.8) and second in minutes per game (44.8).

The Bulls fell to 24–58 in the 1976–77 season. Love played in 74 games, averaging 37.1 minutes, 19.1 points, 6.7 rebounds, and 1.9 assists per game. He led the Bulls in scoring average for a sixth consecutive season. Walker did not play that season on principle, in connection with his position on an antitrust suit against the NBA as to how he should be treated as an individual.

Love did not become a full-time starter in the NBA until the 1969–70 season when he was 27 years old. From the 1969–70 season to the 1975–76 season, between the ages of 27 and 33, Love averaged over 21 or more points per game six consecutive seasons, led the Bulls in scoring average six consecutive seasons, often led the team in minutes played per game, was an All-Star three times, a second-team All-Defensive player three times, and was second-team All-NBA twice. He was in the top 10 in the NBA twice in scoring. He led the Bulls in scoring and minutes played numerous times during the NBA playoffs.

Over his Bulls career, he played in 592 games, averaging 37.3 minutes, 21.3 points, 6.8 rebounds, and 1.7 assists per game. He appeared in 47 Bulls' playoff games, starting 42, and averaging 43.9 minutes, 22.9 points, 7.5 rebounds, and 1.9 assists per game. He ranks fifth all-time in Bulls history in points per game and minutes per game.

=== New York Nets and Seattle SuperSonics ===
Love played in 14 games for the Bulls at the beginning of the 1976–77 season, now under coach Ed Badger (the first time Love played for a coach in Chicago other than Motta). Love averaged 35.4 minutes, 12.2 points, and 5.2 rebounds per game. At the end of November 1976, the Bulls traded Love to the New York Nets for cash and a second round draft choice. Love had expressed unhappiness at the Bulls' style of play before he was traded. The Nets were only planning to use him 20 to 25 minutes per game. He played in 13 games for the Nets, averaging 10.1 points per game in only 17.5 minutes per game. The Nets waived Love on January 19, 1977, and he was signed by the Seattle SuperSonics. He played in 32 games for the SuperSonics, averaging less than 15 minutes per game. The SuperSonics released Love in early September 1977.

Love finished in the NBA with career totals of 13,895 points, 1,123 assists, and 4,653 rebounds, averaging 17.6 points and 5.9 rebounds in nearly 32 minutes per game.

== Legacy and honors ==
In 2023, Love was named as a member of the Chicago Bulls Ring of Honor's inaugural class, which also included, among others, Michael Jordan, Scottie Pippen, Phil Jackson, Chet Walker, and Jerry Sloan. Love received the Individual Achievement Award from the National Council for Communicative Disorders, and the NBA's Oscar Robertson Leadership Award in 1989. On January 14, 1994, Love's No. 10 jersey was the second jersey number to be retired by the Chicago Bulls (Jerry Sloan's No. 4 being the first). Southern University retired his No. 41 on January 7, 2012. Love was inducted into the Louisiana Sports Hall of Fame in 1983. He was also selected to the NAIA (1973), Basketball Coaches, Illinois, and Helms Halls of Fame. There is a historical marker to Love in Baton Rouge.

Johnny "Red" Kerr, a longtime NBA player, the first Chicago Bulls coach, the team's broadcaster for over 30 years, and another member of the Bulls Ring of Honor inaugural class said of Love: "'When I think of Bob Love, I think of humility. His name says it all: L-o-v-e. There's a lot of love in that man. There's a lot of love for that man. God certainly gave Bob the perfect last name — Love'".

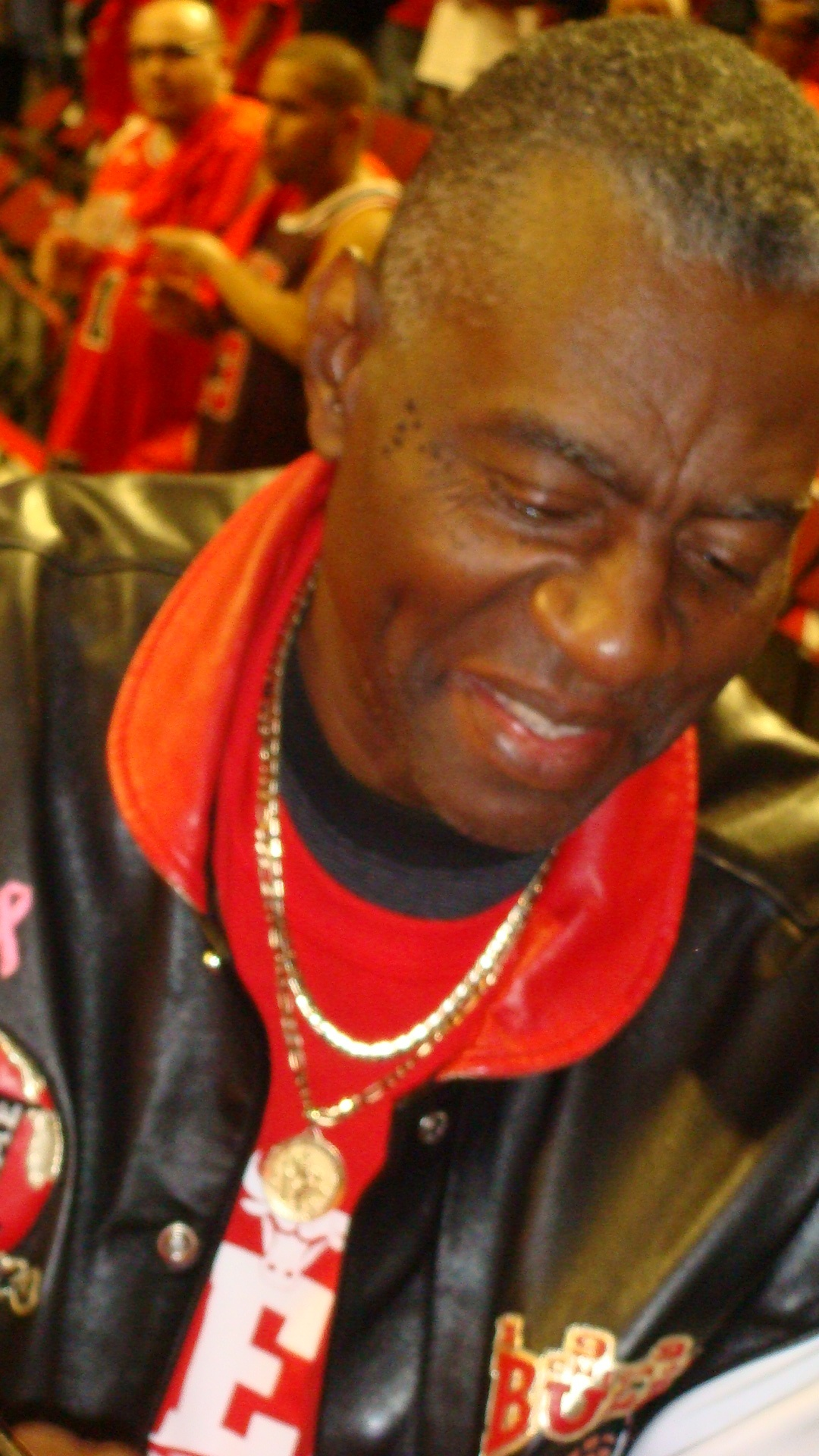
Love in 2010

== Personal life, speech disability, and death ==
Love had a second back surgery in 1977 or 1982. Over his career, Love had developed significant disc problems in his back that ultimately required disc replacement. When he suffered back pain during his career, Love recalled that it was typically addressed with cortisone injections and pills to dull the pain (in addition to his 1967 surgery), so that he could continue playing. After his second back surgery, he was given medical advice that he might never walk normally again; and he sometimes needed a cane or crutches at age 40 (while regularly receiving physical therapy). It is reported that after he returned home post-surgery, Love found that his wife had abandoned him and taken their possessions and money, including his personal rings. Love said that she left him a note, reading '''I don't want to be married to a stutterer and a cripple'''. In 1983, he was living in Kirkland, Washington with his five children.

Love had developed a severe stutter in childhood that persisted throughout his college and NBA life. Once he was out of the NBA, this in large part prevented him from finding meaningful employment. In late 1984, the 42-year old Love applied for job at a Nordstrom department store in Seattle, and was hired as a busboy and dishwasher. He earned $4.45 an hour. John Nordstrom, the director of the family business, was so impressed with the former NBA star's work ethic, he offered to pay for speech therapy classes so that Love could improve his communication ability and become a manager at Nordstrom. Love worked with speech therapist Susan Hamilton two hours a day three times a week for one year in helping Love overcome his stuttering. Over time, his speech improved to the extent that Love became a motivational speaker.

John Nordstrom promoted Love to manager of health and sanitation for Nordstrom's national seventy-restaurant chain; and two years later made Love a corporate spokesperson. In the early 1990s, Bulls owner Jerry Reinsdorf reached out to Love about joining the Bulls after reading about Love's story in the news media. The Bulls hired Love as Director of Community Affairs, where he spoke to thousands of teenagers, making hundreds of speeches a year. One of Love's duties in this position involved regularly speaking to school children. During this time period, Love had also become a motivational speaker.

Love's 1995 wedding ceremony to Rachel Dixon took place on the basketball court at the United Center in Chicago, during halftime of a game between the Bulls and San Antonio Spurs. Lacy J. Banks, a minister and sportswriter for the Chicago Sun-Times presided at the wedding with Bulls owner Jerry Reinsdorf and general manager Jerry Krause, among others, attending the ceremony. A sellout crowd cheered the couple.

Love died after a long battle with cancer in Chicago, on November 18, 2024, at the age of 81. The Bulls announced his death on their social media accounts later that day.

== NBA career statistics ==
Legend
GP	Games played	GS	Games started	MPG	Minutes per game
FG%	Field goal percentage	3P%	3-point field goal percentage	FT%	Free throw percentage
RPG	Rebounds per game	APG	Assists per game	SPG	Steals per game
BPG	Blocks per game	PPG	Points per game	**Bold**	Career high
*	Led the league

=== Regular season ===
Year	Team	GP	GS	MPG	FG%	3P%	FT%	RPG	APG	SPG	BPG	PPG
1966–67	Cincinnati	66	—	16.3	.429	—	.633	3.9	0.7	—	—	6.7
1967–68	Cincinnati	72	—	14.8	.424	—	.684	2.9	0.8	—	—	6.4
1968–69	Milwaukee	14	—	16.2	.368	—	.763	4.6	0.2	—	—	7.6
1968–69	Chicago	35	—	9.0	.416	—	.724	2.5	0.4	—	—	5.1
1969–70	Chicago	**82***	—	38.1	**.466**	—	.842	**8.7**	1.8	—	—	21.0
1970–71	Chicago	81	—	**43.0**	.447	—	.829	8.5	**2.3**	—	—	25.2
1971–72	Chicago	79	—	39.3	.442	—	.784	6.6	1.6	—	—	**25.8**
1972–73	Chicago	**82***	—	37.0	.431	—	.824	6.5	1.5	—	—	23.1
1973–74	Chicago	**82***	—	40.1	.417	—	.818	6.0	1.6	**1.0**	**0.3**	21.8
1974–75	Chicago	61	—	39.4	.429	—	.830	6.3	1.7	**1.0**	0.2	22.0
1975–76	Chicago	76	—	37.1	.390	—	.801	6.7	1.9	0.8	0.1	19.1
1976–77	Chicago	14	—	35.4	.338	—	.761	5.2	1.6	0.6	0.1	12.2
1976–77	New York	13	—	17.5	.462	—	.846	2.9	0.3	0.1	0.2	10.1
1976–77	Seattle	32	—	14.1	.372	—	**.872**	2.7	0.7	0.4	0.1	4.1
Career		789	—	31.8	.429	—	.805	5.9	1.4	0.8	0.2	17.6

=== Playoffs ===
Year	Team	GP	GS	MPG	FG%	3P%	FT%	RPG	APG	SPG	BPG	PPG
1969–70	Chicago	5	—	34.4	.385	—	.792	9.2	0.8	—	—	11.8
1970–71	Chicago	7	—	**47.1***	**.491**	—	.806	7.3	1.4	—	—	**26.7***
1971–72	Chicago	4	—	43.3	.360	—	**.846**	6.8	1.8	—	—	18.8
1972–73	Chicago	7	—	44.9	.459	—	.732	**9.6**	**3.3**	—	—	23.7
1973–74	Chicago	11	—	44.5	.405	—	.763	5.7	2.2	**1.3**	**0.5**	23.0
1974–75	Chicago	**13**	—	44.8	.437	—	.779	7.5	1.5	0.8	0.4	25.8
Career		47	—	43.9	.431	—	.776	7.5	1.9	1.0	0.4	22.9

== Bibliography ==
- The Bob Love Story: If It's Gonna Be, It's Up to Me (ISBN 0-8092-2597-2), in 1999.
