= Dick Motta =

American former basketball coach (born 1931)

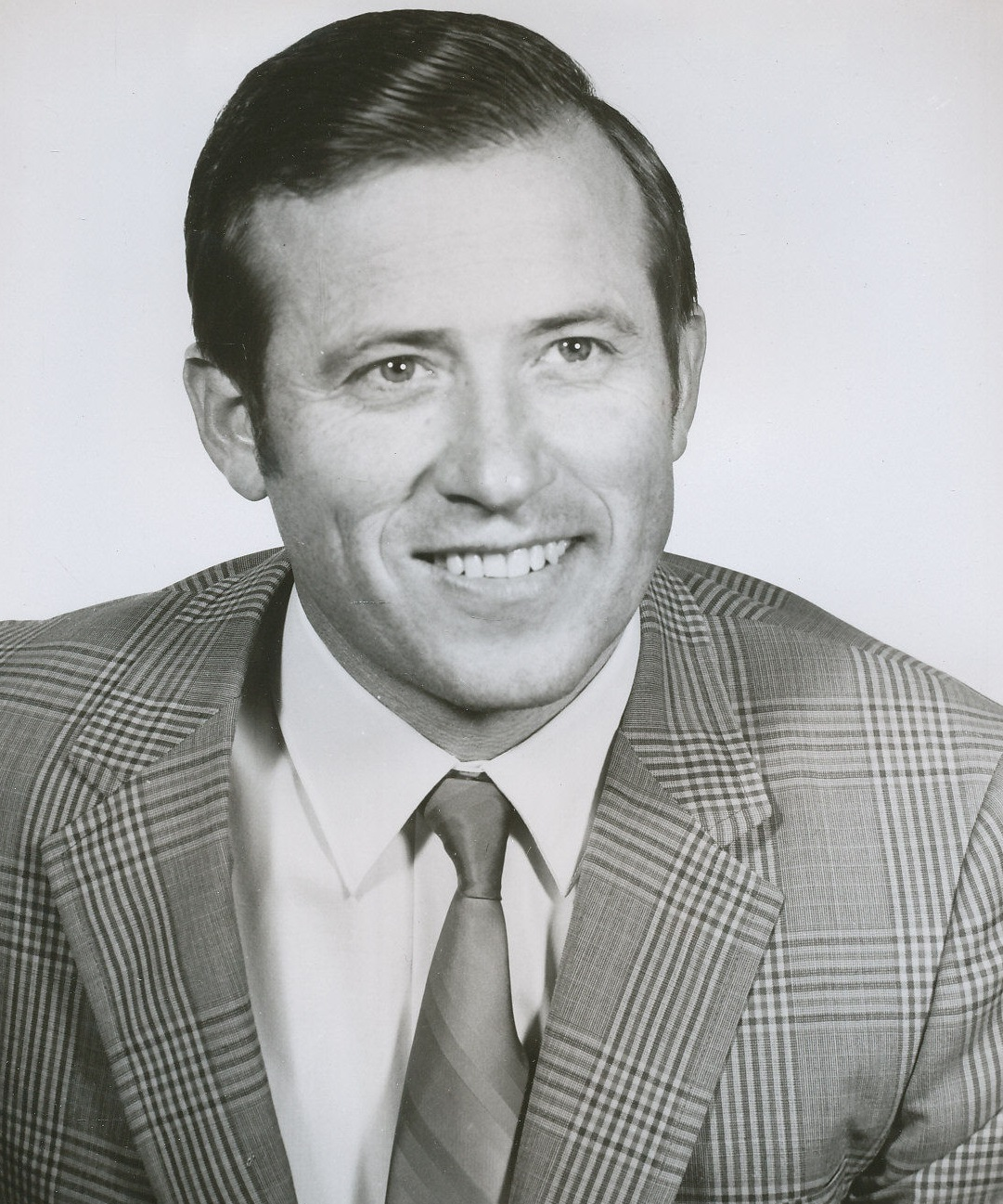
- Motta in 1971

Personal information
- Born: September 3, 1931 (age 95) Midvale, Utah, U.S.
- Listed height: 5 ft 10 in (1.78 m)
- Listed weight: 170 lb (77 kg)

Career information
- High school: Jordan (Sandy, Utah)
- College: Utah State
- Coaching career: 1968–1997

Career highlights
- NBA champion (1978); NBA Coach of the Year (1971); NBA All-Star Game head coach (1979); Chuck Daly Lifetime Achievement Award (2015); Big Sky Coach of the Year (1965); 3× Big Sky champion (1965, 1966, 1968)

Career coaching record
- NBA: 935–1017 (.479)
- Record at Basketball Reference

John Richard Motta (born September 3, 1931) is an American former basketball coach whose career in the National Basketball Association (NBA) spanned 25 years. Motta coached the Washington Bullets to the 1978 NBA Championship, and he won the 1971 NBA Coach of the Year Award with the Chicago Bulls. Motta is eighth all-time with 1,952 games as coach, while ranking 13th in wins and fourth in losses; he has the most wins of eligible coaches not currently inducted into the Basketball Hall of Fame. In 25 seasons as a coach, he reached the postseason fourteen times.

Known as a strict disciplinarian with high expectations for his players, Motta developed a reputation for putting together well-conditioned, tough, physical teams. He was known for his eccentric personality and fiery temper, which included throwing his jacket at a referee, kicking a basketball into the stands and throwing a dollar bill onto the court and demanding it to play after a GM traded one of his players for cash considerations. He retired from coaching in 1997 and ran a bed and breakfast with his wife in Bear Lake, Idaho.

== Early life and college ==
John Richard Motta was born on September 3, 1931, in Midvale, Utah. He attended Jordan High School in Sandy, Utah, where he excelled in basketball.

Motta attended Utah State University in Logan, Utah. He initially majored in agriculture before switching his major to physical education in his sophomore year.

== Coaching career ==
Motta taught seventh grade and coached for a few years at the junior high school before being drafted in the Air Force, reaching the rank of Lieutenant. He returned in 1957 to the town and became the head coach of the high school. At a parents night, he had members of the basketball team and their parents sign a paper that laid out the expectations Motta had for the parents. On New Year's Day of his first season, upon seeing three of his players hung over from drinking the night before, Motta immediately cut them from the team; he did not budge even over the objections of the town.

The team went 10-6 in his first season and he took the failure to make the state tournament personally. The 1958 team went 24-4 and the 1959 team went 25-2 on their way to the state tournament, which culminated in the Idaho Class (AA) championship in 1959; on the roster for the title was Phil Johnson, who became an NBA head coach. As late as 2026, Motta stated in an interview that winning the state championship was his greatest thrill as a coach, even topping the NBA championship he won two decades later.

=== Weber State (1960–1968) ===
In 1960, he was hired as the head basketball coach at Weber College in Ogden, Utah, which at the time was in transition from transitioning to a four-year program. Under the direction of Motta and assistant coach Phil Johnson, Weber State won three Big Sky Conference championships (1965, 1966, 1968).

=== Chicago Bulls (1968–1976) ===
Motta was hired as head coach of the Chicago Bulls in 1968 after a six-year stint at Weber State. He replaced Johnny Kerr, who had led the team to two playoff appearances despite subpar records of 33-48 and 29–53, respectively. Motta coached the team for eight seasons, coaching 656 games. From 1970 to 1974 he led the Bulls to four consecutive 50-win seasons, winning the NBA Coach of the Year Award in 1971. It did not translate to playoff success, as the Bulls won just one playoff series (1974) in that span. However, they advanced to the Western Conference Finals in the 1974–75 season, beating the Kansas City Kings to play the Golden State Warriors in a series which they lost in seven games. The team went an NBA-worst 24–58 in 1975–76. He was eventually replaced by Ed Badger on August 25, 1976.

=== Washington Bullets (1976–1980) ===
Motta had two years left on his contract with the Bulls who allowed him to negotiate with the Washington Bullets. He left the Bulls to succeed K. C. Jones in a similar capacity with the Bullets on May 28, 1976. In his first season, the Bullets went 48-34 while advancing to the Semifinals again after beating the Cavaliers in the First Round, although they lost to the Houston Rockets in six games. The next year was the pinnacle for the team and Motta's career. They went 44–38, but they advanced all the way to the 1978 NBA Finals, where they beat the Seattle SuperSonics in seven games to win the NBA championship. The following year, the team went 54-28 while winning the Atlantic Division. This was not only their sixth division title in eight years, it was also their last division title until 2017. The Bullets went to the 1979 NBA Finals, although they had to fight the full seven games in both the Semifinals and the conference finals, as they nearly blew a 3–1 series lead to the Atlanta Hawks in the Semifinals and having to come back from a 3–1 series deficit from the San Antonio Spurs in the Eastern Conference Finals. In the Finals that year, they played the Seattle SuperSonics once again. The Bullets won Game 1 at home 99–97, but the SuperSonics won the following four games to win the NBA championship. It is the last time the team has reached the NBA Finals. The following year, the Bullets went 39–43, although they qualified for a playoff berth. They were beaten by the Philadelphia 76ers in two games. He resigned as head coach on May 27, 1980, despite having one year left on his contract. He had an agreement to honor that remaining year by joining the Bullets front office as a special consultant to general manager Bob Ferry if he didn't get any head coaching appointments from other teams. He was succeeded by Gene Shue.

=== "The opera isn't over 'til the fat lady sings!" ===
Motta is sometimes erroneously credited with coining the celebrated phrase: The opera ain't over 'til the fat lady sings. In fact, the first recorded use of the phrase was by Texas Tech sports information director Ralph Carpenter, as reported in the Dallas Morning News on 10 March 1976.

During a KENS-TV broadcast of the 1978 NBA Eastern Conference semi-finals between the Washington Bullets and the San Antonio Spurs, KENS Sports anchor Dan Cook used the phrase in an attempt to encourage Spurs fans, as their team was down three games to one against the Bullets. Motta heard the broadcast and adopted his own rendition of the expression — "The 'opera' isn't over 'til the fat lady sings" — to warn Bullets fans against braggadocio.

The odds were against the underdog Bullets, and sportswriters were forecasting a grim finale, so Motta rebounded with the upbeat ostinato, "Wait for the fat lady!" The Bullets won the Eastern Conference against the Atlantic Division Champion Philadelphia 76ers, and went on to beat the Western Conference Champion Seattle SuperSonics four games to three for the 1978 NBA title.

The victory gave Washington, D.C. fans their first professional championship team in any sport since the Washington Redskins won the NFL title in 1942. (In Motta's second year as coach, the Bullets had become only the third team to win the NBA championship in a seventh game on the road). That 1978 championship remains the franchise's only NBA championship.

After the climactic Game 7 victory to claim the title, Motta celebrated with his team wearing a beer-soaked The Opera Isn't Over 'Til The Fat Lady Sings T-shirt.

What made the championship so great was that we weren’t supposed to win it. We came a long way. Most people didn’t give us a chance, but I felt all along we could. I really did. — Dick Motta

In a Nov. 5, 2003 interview in the Utah Statesman, the student newspaper of his alma mater Utah State University, Motta said opera lovers were angry with him at first. "My wife said they were going to kill me when I said that." But that as time passed, Motta said, he was extended friendly invitations to a variety of events with "operatic" themes ranging from the Metropolitan Opera in New York to the Grand Ole Opry in Nashville.

=== Dallas Mavericks (1980–1987) ===
Motta was the first head coach of the Dallas Mavericks, hired by the team on July 16, 1980. His first team went 15–67, last in the league. They did not lose as many games again until 1992 when they lost 60 games. Motta's Mavericks gradually rose up in prominence, rising in finishes in the Midwest Division from 6th in the first season to 4th by the third year. His fourth season (1983-84) was the start of something big for the team, as they went 43-39 while qualifying for the playoffs for the first time. They defeated the Seattle SuperSonics in the First Round to advance to the Semifinals, where they lost to the Los Angeles Lakers in five games. The following year, the Mavs went to the playoffs once again after a 44–38 season, although they lost to the Portland Trail Blazers in the First Round. They went to the Semifinals the following year after another 44-38 year and defeating the Utah Jazz in the First Round, although it ended with another loss to the Lakers. The next season was Motta's last, and it was his best with the team as they went 55-27 and finished 2nd in the Western Conference, winning their first Midwest Division title (the Mavericks did not win a division title again for twenty seasons). However, they lost to the SuperSonics in the First Round in four games. During the end of the season, the New York Knicks and Los Angeles Clippers inquired about his services. After talking to team owner Don Carter (but not GM Norm Sonju), Motta decided to hold a news conference announcing his resignation on May 20.

=== Sacramento Kings (1990–91) ===
On January 4, 1990, Motta was hired by the Sacramento Kings in the middle of the season, replacing Jerry Reynolds, who had led the team to a 7–21 record. Motta coached the Kings to a 16–38 record, finishing with a 23–59. The next season, the Kings went 25-57 while finishing dead last in the Pacific Division. After a 7–18 start, Motta told a radio station on December 24, 1991 of his plans to resign at the end of the year. He was fired that same day by the team.

During his tenure as coach, the Kings went 8–76 in road games, including 43 straight losses on the road.

=== Dallas Mavericks (1994–1996) ===
In the midst of the 1993-94 season, Don Carter brought Motta in as an unpaid consultant. On May 17, 1994, Dallas hired Motta back as coach of the team, replacing Quinn Buckner, who went 13–69. Motta led the team to a 23-game improvement with a 36–46 record. His second and final season was less successful as they went 26–56. He was reassigned from his head coach role on May 1, 1996.

=== Denver Nuggets (1996–97) ===
The Denver Nuggets hired Motta on November 26, 1996, replacing Bernie Bickerstaff, who had gotten off to a 4–9 start. He was signed to a two-year contract. The Nuggets went into a tailspin, going 17-52 while losing 26 of their final 30 games (with only five wins after the All-Star break ended) to finish 21-61 and 12th in the Western Conference. With a year left on his contract, Motta and his coaching staff were fired on April 21, 1997.

== Head coaching record ==
Legend
Regular season	G	Games coached	W	Games won	L	Games lost	W–L %	Win–loss %
Playoffs	PG	Playoff games	PW	Playoff wins	PL	Playoff losses	PW–L %	Playoff win–loss %

Team	Year	G	W	L	W–L%	Finish	PG	PW	PL	PW–L%	Result
Chicago	1968–69	82	33	49	.402	5th in West	—	—	—	—	Missed Playoffs
Chicago	1969–70	82	39	43	.476	3rd in West	5	1	4	.200	Lost in Division semifinals
Chicago	1970–71	82	51	31	.622	2nd in Midwest	7	3	4	.429	Lost in Conf. Semifinals
Chicago	1971–72	82	57	25	.695	2nd in Midwest	4	0	4	.000	Lost in Conf. Semifinals
Chicago	1972–73	82	51	31	.622	2nd in Midwest	7	3	4	.429	Lost in Conf. Semifinals
Chicago	1973–74	82	54	28	.659	2nd in Midwest	11	4	7	.364	Lost in Conf. Finals
Chicago	1974–75	82	47	35	.573	1st in Midwest	13	7	6	.538	Lost in Conf. Finals
Chicago	1975–76	82	24	58	.293	4th in Midwest	—	—	—	—	Missed Playoffs
Washington	1976–77	82	48	34	.585	2nd in Central	9	4	5	.444	Lost in Conf. Semifinals
Washington	1977–78	82	44	38	.537	2nd in Central	21	14	7	.667	Won NBA Championship
Washington	1978–79	82	54	28	.659	1st in Atlantic	19	9	10	.474	Lost in NBA Finals
Washington	1979–80	82	39	43	.476	3rd in Atlantic	2	0	2	.000	Lost in First round
Dallas	1980–81	82	15	67	.183	6th in Midwest	—	—	—	—	Missed Playoffs
Dallas	1981–82	82	28	54	.341	5th in Midwest	—	—	—	—	Missed Playoffs
Dallas	1982–83	82	38	44	.463	4th in Midwest	—	—	—	—	Missed Playoffs
Dallas	1983–84	82	43	39	.524	2nd in Midwest	10	4	6	.400	Lost in Conf. Semifinals
Dallas	1984–85	82	44	38	.537	3rd in Midwest	4	1	3	.250	Lost in First round
Dallas	1985–86	82	44	38	.537	3rd in Midwest	10	5	5	.500	Lost in Conf. Semifinals
Dallas	1986–87	82	55	27	.671	1st in Midwest	4	1	3	.250	Lost in First round
Sacramento	1989–90	54	16	38	.296	7th in Pacific	—	—	—	—	Missed Playoffs
Sacramento	1990–91	82	25	57	.305	7th in Pacific	—	—	—	—	Missed Playoffs
Sacramento	1991–92	25	7	18	.280	(fired)	—	—	—	—	—
Dallas	1994–95	82	36	46	.439	5th in Midwest	—	—	—	—	Missed Playoffs
Dallas	1995–96	82	26	56	.317	5th in Midwest	—	—	—	—	Missed Playoffs
Denver	1996–97	69	17	52	.246	5th in Midwest	—	—	—	—	Missed Playoffs
Career		1,952	935	1,017	.479		126	56	70	.444	

== Personal life ==
After being fired by the Denver Nuggets, Motta retired from coaching. He returned to his native Utah, where he and his wife Jan opened a bed and breakfast, The Bluebird Inn, at Bear Lake on the border of Utah and Idaho.

== Legacy ==
Motta's 935 victories rank as 14th most in NBA history, with Motta being the only retired coach on the top 15 to not be a member of the Naismith Basketball Hall of Fame, despite staunch support from former players and Hall of Fame members in Wes Unseld and Jerry Sloan. He was also left off the best coaches of all time list for both the NBA's 50th anniversary and 75th anniversary. He ranks 9th all-time in games coached and fourth in losses. Even in 1995 when he approached 900 wins, he publicly stated to a reporter that he never expected to make the Hall of Fame in his lifetime because of the nature of the election process being "very political". In a 2023 article about his snub in the Dallas Morning News, a theory was publicly addressed that a grudge with Jerry Colangelo, who currently serves as the chairman of the Naismith Hall’s board of governors, may be a factor in Motta being snubbed for decades. In 2024, Motta was recognized by the Big Sky Conference with induction into their Hall of Fame. In Motta's tenure as a head coach, several people who either played for him or coached with him became a head coach in their own right, such as Rick Adelman, Jason Kidd, and Jerry Sloan.

Motta reflected again on the Hall of Fame in 2026:

When they called me [in 2012] to tell me I hadn’t made it, I didn’t get bitter. At all. I developed the basic attitude of: ‘Why should some (stranger) out there judge me?’ I object to subjective judgments. It’s beneath one’s dignity. I don’t need to, and I don’t want to pound my chest. I know what I did.”

== Bibliography ==
- Dyani Gordon. "When Washington Went to the Opera"
- NBA Encyclopedia. "'Fat Lady' Sings Victorious Tune for Bullets"
