= 1974 NBA Finals =

1974 basketball championship series

Team	Coach	Wins
Boston Celtics	Tom Heinsohn	4
Milwaukee Bucks	Larry Costello	3
- Dates: April 28–May 12
- MVP: John Havlicek (Boston Celtics)
- Hall of Famers: Celtics: Dave Cowens (1991); John Havlicek (1984); Don Nelson (2012, coach); Paul Westphal (2019); Jo Jo White (2015); Bucks: Bob Dandridge (2021); Oscar Robertson (1980); Kareem Abdul-Jabbar (1995); Coaches: Tom Heinsohn (2015); Larry Costello (2022); Officials: Darell Garretson (2016); Mendy Rudolph (2007)
- Eastern finals: Celtics defeated Knicks, 4–1
- Western finals: Bucks defeated Bulls, 4–0

The 1974 NBA World Championship Series was the championship round of the 1973–74 National Basketball Association (NBA) season. The Eastern Conference champion Boston Celtics defeated the Western Conference champion Milwaukee Bucks in seven games to win their twelfth NBA championship. This was the last time the Celtics won a Game 7 on the road until 2022.

== Background ==
=== Milwaukee Bucks ===
The Milwaukee Bucks returned to the NBA Finals after a three-year absence. Some of the cast from the 1971 championship team, such as Kareem Abdul-Jabbar (then Lew Alcindor), Jon McGlocklin, Bob Dandridge and the retiring Oscar Robertson returned for another title run; however, starting guard Lucius Allen, who averaged 17.6 points and 5.2 assists per game, was injured and did not play in the series. The Bucks eliminated the Los Angeles Lakers and the Chicago Bulls in five and four games, respectively, to advance to the Finals.

=== Boston Celtics ===
The Boston Celtics won a franchise record 68 games in the 1972–73 season, but a shoulder injury to John Havlicek quashed their title hopes, as they lost in seven games to the New York Knicks in the conference finals. Havlicek returned healthier for the 1973–74 season, and with Dave Cowens, Paul Silas and Jo Jo White entering the prime of their careers, the Celtics appeared poised for another title run. The Celtics, though winning 12 fewer games than the previous season, made the Finals, defeating the Buffalo Braves in six games before ousting the defending champion New York Knicks in five games.

=== Road to the Finals ===
Milwaukee Bucks (Western Conference champion)		Boston Celtics (Eastern Conference champion)
# / Western Conference; # / Team / W / L / PCT / GB; 1 / z-Milwaukee Bucks / 59 / 23 / .720 / –; 2 / x-Chicago Bulls / 54 / 28 / .659 / 5; 3 / x-Detroit Pistons / 52 / 30 / .634 / 7; 4 / y-Los Angeles Lakers / 47 / 35 / .573 / 12; 5 / Golden State Warriors / 44 / 38 / .537 / 15; 6 / Seattle SuperSonics / 36 / 46 / .439 / 23; 7 / Kansas City–Omaha Kings / 33 / 49 / .402 / 26; 8 / Phoenix Suns / 30 / 52 / .366 / 29; 9 / Portland Trail Blazers / 27 / 55 / .329 / 32; 1st seed in the West, best league record	Regular season	# / Eastern Conference; # / Team / W / L / PCT / GB; 1 / z-Boston Celtics / 56 / 26 / .683 / –; 2 / x-New York Knicks / 49 / 33 / .598 / 7; 3 / y-Capital Bullets / 47 / 35 / .573 / 9; 4 / x-Buffalo Braves / 42 / 40 / .512 / 14; 5 / Atlanta Hawks / 35 / 47 / .427 / 21; 6 / Houston Rockets / 32 / 50 / .390 / 24; 7 / Cleveland Cavaliers / 29 / 53 / .354 / 27; 8 / Philadelphia 76ers / 25 / 57 / .305 / 31; 1st seed in the East, 2nd best league record
Defeated the (4) Los Angeles Lakers, 4–1	Conference Semifinals	Defeated the (4) Buffalo Braves, 4–2
Defeated the (2) Chicago Bulls, 4–0	Conference Finals	Defeated the (2) New York Knicks, 4–1

=== Regular season series ===
These teams split the four-game season series, each winning once at home and on the road.

November 16, 1973

Milwaukee Bucks 90, Boston Celtics 105

Boston Garden, Boston, Massachusetts

November 30, 1973

Boston Celtics 93, Milwaukee Bucks 117

Milwaukee Arena, Milwaukee, Wisconsin

February 6, 1974

Boston Celtics 105, Milwaukee Bucks 104

Milwaukee Arena, Milwaukee, Wisconsin

February 10, 1974

Milwaukee Bucks 95, Boston Celtics 86

Providence Civic Center, Providence, Rhode Island

== Series summary ==
Game	Date	Home team	Result	Road team
Game 1	April 28	Milwaukee Bucks	83–98 (0–1)	Boston Celtics
Game 2	April 30	Milwaukee Bucks	105–96 (OT) (1–1)	Boston Celtics
Game 3	May 3	Boston Celtics	95–83 (2–1)	Milwaukee Bucks
Game 4	May 5	Boston Celtics	89–97 (2–2)	Milwaukee Bucks
Game 5	May 7	Milwaukee Bucks	87–96 (2–3)	Boston Celtics
Game 6	May 10	Boston Celtics	101–102 (2OT) (3–3)	Milwaukee Bucks
Game 7	May 12	Milwaukee Bucks	87–102 (3–4)	Boston Celtics

Celtics win series 4–3

=== Game 1 ===
April 28

Boxscore

Boston Celtics 98, Milwaukee Bucks 83
Scoring by quarter: 35–19, 17–23, 17–19, 29–22
Pts: John Havlicek 26; Rebs: Dave Cowens 17; Asts: Cowens, White 7 each	Pts: Kareem Abdul-Jabbar 35; Rebs: Kareem Abdul-Jabbar 14; Asts: Oscar Robertson 8
Boston leads series, 1–0

Milwaukee Arena, Milwaukee, Wisconsin
Attendance: 10,938
Referees: Richie Powers, Jake O'Donnell

Before the series started, Bucks point guard Lucius Allen would be lost for the series with a knee injury. In Game 1, the Celtics took advantage, harassing a 35-year-old Oscar Robertson and Allen's replacement, Ron Williams, into frequent turnovers. The Celtics took a 35–19 lead in the first quarter and never looked back on the way to a 98–83 win in Milwaukee. Kareem Abdul-Jabbar scored 35 points for the Bucks.

=== Game 2 ===
April 30

Boxscore

Boston Celtics 96, Milwaukee Bucks 105 (OT)
Scoring by quarter: 24–23, 17–32, 25–22, 24–13, Overtime: 6–15
Pts: Jo Jo White 25; Rebs: Dave Cowens 11; Asts: Dave Cowens 6	Pts: Kareem Abdul-Jabbar 36; Rebs: Kareem Abdul Jabbar 15; Asts: Oscar Robertson 9
Series tied, 1–1

Milwaukee Arena, Milwaukee, Wisconsin
Attendance: 10,938
Referees: Mendy Rudolph, Darell Garretson

Kareem Abdul-Jabbar scored 36 points, but more importantly, he took more of a role in running the Bucks' offense from the post, given their backcourt issues. His passing enabled Bob Dandridge to score 24 points.

On the defensive end, Abdul-Jabbar forced Dave Cowens into shooting 8-of-22 from the floor, including a block of a Cowens shot at the end of regulation to force overtime. The Bucks won 105–96 to even the series at a game apiece as it headed to Boston.

This game, played on April 30, was the last NBA Championship Series game played in the month of April to date.

=== Game 3 ===
May 3

Boxscore

Milwaukee Bucks 83, Boston Celtics 95
Scoring by quarter: 13–32, 24–19, 22–26, 24–18
Pts: Kareem Abdul-Jabbar 26; Rebs: Abdul-Jabbar, Warner 10 each Asts: Abdul-Jabbar, Robertson 5 each	Pts: Dave Cowens 30; Rebs: John Havlicek 12; Asts: Jo Jo White 8
Boston leads series, 2–1

Boston Garden, Boston, Massachusetts
Attendance: 15,320
Referees: Richie Powers, Don Murphy

Sensing he was no match for Abdul-Jabbar in the paint, Dave Cowens decided to shoot more from the outside and scored 30 points, despite foul trouble that reduced him to 32 minutes of playing time. The Celtics' press also turned up the heat, forcing 11 first-quarter turnovers and helping Boston to a 21-point lead. With Cowens in foul trouble, seldom-used 7-footer Henry Finkel did an admirable job of spot defense on Abdul-Jabbar, who finished with 26 points. At game's end, the Bucks had turned the ball over 27 times, enough for a 95–83 Boston win. This would be the last time the home team won in the series.

=== Game 4 ===
May 5

Boxscore

Milwaukee Bucks 97, Boston Celtics 89
Scoring by quarter: 28–27, 21–12, 21–26, 27–24
Pts: Kareem Abdul-Jabbar 34; Rebs: Kareem Abdul-Jabbar 14; Asts: Oscar Robertson 9	Pts: John Havlicek 33; Rebs: Paul Silas 12; Asts: Jo Jo White 9
Series tied, 2–2

Boston Garden, Boston, Massachusetts
Attendance: 15,320
Referees: Mendy Rudolph, Earl Strom

With Ron Williams unable to handle the Celtics' press and shooting guard Jon McGlocklin nursing a sprained ankle, Bucks coach Larry Costello turned to little-used forward Mickey Davis for help in the backcourt. Davis at 6'7" presented matchup problems on offense for Jo Jo White, forcing Celtics coach Tom Heinsohn to assign Don Chaney to guard him. This enabled Oscar Robertson to more effectively set up the Bucks' offense.

Davis contributed 15 points and Kareem Abdul-Jabbar shredded the Celtics for 34 points and six assists from the low post. Milwaukee got the lead and kept it down the stretch for a 97–89 win at Boston Garden, thereby regaining homecourt advantage.

=== Game 5 ===
May 7

Boxscore

Boston Celtics 96, Milwaukee Bucks 87
Scoring by quarter: 20–15, 25–29, 24–17, 27–26
Pts: Cowens, Havlicek 28 each Rebs: Paul Silas 16; Asts: Dave Cowens 6	Pts: Kareem Abdul-Jabbar 37; Rebs: Kareem Abdul-Jabbar 11; Asts: Jon McGlocklin 8
Boston leads series, 3–2

Milwaukee Arena, Milwaukee, Wisconsin
Attendance: 10,938
Referees: Richie Powers, Jake O'Donnell

The Celtics stole the homecourt advantage back with a 96–87 win in Milwaukee. John Havlicek and Dave Cowens scored 28 points each and Kareem Abdul-Jabbar scored 37 points. They would have a chance to close it out at home in Game 6.

=== Game 6 ===
May 10

Boxscore

Milwaukee Bucks 102, Boston Celtics 101 (2OT)
Scoring by quarter: 27–19, 20–21, 22–23, 17–23, Overtime: 4–4, 12–11
Pts: Kareem Abdul-Jabbar 34; Rebs: 4 players 8 each (Note: Abdul-Jabbar, Davis, Perry, Warner); Asts: Oscar Robertson 10	Pts: John Havlicek 36; Rebs: Havlicek, Silas 9 Asts: Jo Jo White 11
Series tied, 3–3

Boston Garden, Boston, Massachusetts
Attendance: 15,320
Referees: Mendy Rudolph, Darell Garretson

Dave Cowens got into foul trouble early and watched from the bench as Milwaukee took a 12-point lead in the first half. The Celtics were down by six late in the game, but they came back to force overtime. John Havlicek hit a long jumper to tie it at 86–86 with a little over a minute left, then Oscar Robertson was caught in a 24-second violation as time expired. In the first overtime, Milwaukee led 90-88 when Don Chaney got a steal and passed to Havlicek. Kareem Abdul-Jabbar was back on defense and forced Havlicek to take a pull-up jumper. Havlicek missed but got the long rebound and scored to send the game into a second overtime.

The second overtime was a furious nip-and-tuck affair, with the lead changing hands 11 times. After Bob Dandridge hit a pair of free throws, Havlicek, who had nine of his team's 11 points in the period, hit a short jumper from the baseline and was fouled by Dandridge. Havlicek hit the foul shot to put the Celtics up 93–92. Then, the frenzied exchange of baskets occurred with neither team leading by more than a point. Abdul-Jabbar hit a skyhook, then Havlicek hit a jumper. Oscar Robertson then scored the next two Bucks baskets, sandwiching a Jo Jo White jumper. Then, Havlicek scored again. On the next possession, Dave Cowens fouled Abdul-Jabbar in the lane, his sixth.

Mickey Davis put the Bucks up 100–99 with a basket with 24 seconds left. With the shot clock turned off, the Celtics worked for a final shot. Coach Tom Heinsohn screamed for a timeout, but with seven seconds left, Havlicek lofted a baseline rainbow over Abdul-Jabbar for a 101–100 lead.

The Bucks called for a timeout, and instead of setting up a play for Abdul-Jabbar, strangely decided to set up a play for a hobbled Jon McGlocklin where Abdul-Jabbar would set a pick from the high post. McGlocklin couldn't get free, however, and Davis was covered as he cut to the basket. Abdul-Jabbar, with the ball, moved to the right of the lane, dribbled to the baseline, and let fly a "sky-hook" from 17 feet which swished in with two seconds left. Jo Jo White put up a failed desperation heave, and that was it. The series was tied at three games apiece and going back to Milwaukee. Havlicek ended with a game-high 36 points and Abdul-Jabbar led the Bucks with 34 points, including the game-winner.

=== Game 7 ===
May 12

Boxscore

Boston Celtics 102, Milwaukee Bucks 87
Scoring by quarter: 22–20, 31–20, 18–26, 31–21
Pts: Dave Cowens 28; Rebs: Dave Cowens 14; Asts: Havlicek, Westphal 6 each	Pts: Kareem Abdul-Jabbar 26; Rebs: Kareem Abdul-Jabbar 13; Asts: Oscar Robertson 11
Boston wins NBA Finals, 4–3

Milwaukee Arena, Milwaukee, Wisconsin
Attendance: 10,938
Referees: Mendy Rudolph, Richie Powers

Home court advantage apparently meant very little in this series. The Celtics decided to abandon man-to-man defense and double and triple team Kareem Abdul-Jabbar, who still scored 26 points. This freed Dave Cowens more on the offensive end, as he hit 8 of 13 shots in the first half on his way to 28 points and 14 rebounds. John Havlicek added 16 as the Celtics cruised to an easy 102–87 win and their first title in the "post-Bill Russell era."

== Television ==
This was the first of 16 consecutive NBA Finals to be televised by CBS. It was the only NBA Finals called by Pat Summerall, best known for his work on the Masters Tournament and the National Football League. His partners on color commentary were Rick Barry and Hot Rod Hundley.

== Team rosters ==
=== Milwaukee Bucks ===
1973–74 Milwaukee Bucks roster
Players

Pos.	No.	Player	Height	Weight	DOB	From
PG	1	Oscar Robertson	6 ft 5 in (1.96 m)	205 lb (93 kg)		Cincinnati
SF	7	Terry Driscoll	6 ft 7 in (2.01 m)	215 lb (98 kg)		Boston College
SF	10	Bob Dandridge	6 ft 6 in (1.98 m)	195 lb (88 kg)		Norfolk State
PG	12	Ron Williams	6 ft 3 in (1.91 m)	188 lb (85 kg)		West Virginia
SG	14	Jon McGlocklin	6 ft 5 in (1.96 m)	205 lb (93 kg)		Indiana
PF	18	Curtis Perry	6 ft 8 in (2.03 m)	220 lb (100 kg)		Missouri State
C	19	Dick Cunningham	6 ft 10 in (2.08 m)	245 lb (111 kg)		Murray State
G/F	20	Mickey Davis	6 ft 7 in (2.01 m)	195 lb (88 kg)		Duquesne
G/F	21	Russ Lee	6 ft 5 in (1.96 m)	185 lb (84 kg)		Marshall
C/G	24	Dick Garrett	6 ft 3 in (1.91 m)	185 lb (84 kg)		Southern Illinois
SF	31	Chuck Terry	6 ft 6 in (1.98 m)	215 lb (98 kg)		Long Beach State
C	33	Kareem Abdul-Jabbar	7 ft 2 in (2.18 m)	225 lb (102 kg)		UCLA
PF/C	35	Cornell Warner	6 ft 9 in (2.06 m)	220 lb (100 kg)		Jackson State
PG	42	Lucius Allen	6 ft 2 in (1.88 m)	175 lb (79 kg)		UCLA

Coaches
Head coach
- Larry Costello
Assistant(s)
- Tom Nissalke

Legend
- (DP) Unsigned draft pick
- (FA) Free agent
- (S) Suspended
- Injured

== Aftermath ==
The Celtics returned to the finals two years later, and won their thirteenth title over the Phoenix Suns in six games, which was the last of two titles the Celtics won during the 1970s.

This was the Bucks' last appearance in the NBA Finals until 2021, where they defeated the aforementioned Suns in six games to end a half-century long championship drought.

== See also ==
- 1974 NBA Playoffs
- 1973–74 NBA season
