= Mickey Davis =

American basketball player

Personal information
- Born: June 16, 1950 (age 76) Rochester, Pennsylvania, U.S.
- Listed height: 6 ft 7 in (2.01 m)
- Listed weight: 195 lb (88 kg)

Career information
- High school: Monaca (Monaca, Pennsylvania)
- College: Duquesne (1969–1971)
- NBA draft: 1972: 7th round, 113th overall pick
- Drafted by: Milwaukee Bucks
- Playing career: 1971–1976
- Position: Forward / guard
- Number: 30, 20

Career history
- 1971–1972: Pittsburgh Condors
- 1972–1976: Milwaukee Bucks

Career ABA and NBA statistics
- Points: 1,542 (5.0 ppg)
- Rebounds: 841 (2.7 rpg)
- Assists: 304 (1.0 apg)
- Stats at NBA.com
- Stats at Basketball Reference

Edward J. "Mickey" Davis (born June 16, 1950) is an American former basketball player in the National Basketball Association (NBA). He played college basketball for the Duquesne Dukes, leading his team in rebounds per game and points per game. He left after his junior season to start his professional career with the Pittsburgh Condors of the American Basketball Association. He was later selected by the Milwaukee Bucks in the seventh round of the 1972 NBA draft and played with the team until 1976.

Davis' professional career was mostly unheralded, but he did garner some national attention during the 1974 NBA Finals with the Bucks. With starting guard Lucius Allen hurt and the rest of the Bucks' guards unable to handle the defensive pressure of the Boston Celtics, Davis, an adept ballhandler, was called upon to play point guard (unusual at the time at 6'7") alongside Oscar Robertson for much of the series and helped the Bucks extend the Celtics to seven games.

On January 6 of that season, in perhaps his best regular season game, Davis scored 22 points, grabbed 8 rebounds, and recorded 4 assists in a loss against the Washington Bullets while starting in place of injured all-star teammate Bob Dandridge.

== NBA career statistics ==
Legend
GP	Games played	GS	Games started	MPG	Minutes per game
FG%	Field goal percentage	3P%	3-point field goal percentage	FT%	Free throw percentage
RPG	Rebounds per game	APG	Assists per game	SPG	Steals per game
BPG	Blocks per game	PPG	Points per game	**Bold**	Career high

=== Regular season ===
Year	Team	GP	GS	MPG	FG%	3P%	FT%	RPG	APG	SPG	BPG	PPG
1971–72	Pittsburgh	23	-	5.5	.397	.000	.700	1.8	0.4	-	-	2.8
1972–73	Milwaukee	74	-	14.1	.438	-	.826	3.1	1.0	-	-	5.1
1973–74	Milwaukee	73	-	13.9	**.504**	-	.830	3.1	**1.2**	**0.4**	0.1	**5.9**
1974–75	Milwaukee	**75**	-	**14.4**	.479	-	.886	**3.2**	1.1	**0.4**	0.1	5.7
1975–76	Milwaukee	45	-	9.1	.362	-	.794	1.9	0.8	0.3	0.0	3.6
1976–77	Milwaukee	19	-	8.7	.426	-	**.920**	1.5	1.1	0.3	**0.2**	4.3
Career		309	-	12.4	.455	.000	.835	2.7	1.0	0.4	0.1	5.0

=== Playoffs ===
Year	Team	GP	GS	MPG	FG%	3P%	FT%	RPG	APG	SPG	BPG	PPG
1972–73	Milwaukee	6	-	9.0	.353	-	**1.000**	2.0	**0.8**	-	-	2.3
1973–74	Milwaukee	**15**	-	**16.3**	**.492**	-	.917	**2.3**	**0.8**	**0.3**	**0.1**	**5.7**
Career		21	-	14.2	.463	-	.923	2.2	0.8	0.3	0.1	4.8

== Personal life and post-basketball career ==
He is the brother of former NBA player Brad Davis. After his playing days, he worked as a regional sales manager for the Miller Brewing Company. He was elected to the Beaver County Sports Hall of Fame in 1985. He has four grown children, and, as of 2021, lives in Florida with his wife, Linda.
