= Larry Costello =

American basketball player and coach (1931–2001)

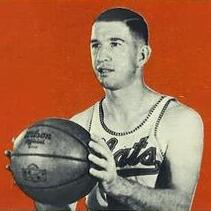
- Costello with the Syracuse Nationals c. 1961

Personal information
- Born: July 2, 1931 Minoa, New York, U.S.
- Died: December 13, 2001 (aged 70) Fort Myers, Florida, U.S.
- Listed height: 6 ft 1 in (1.85 m)
- Listed weight: 186 lb (84 kg)

Career information
- High school: Minoa (Minoa, New York)
- College: Niagara (1951–1954)
- NBA draft: 1954: 2nd round, 12th overall pick
- Drafted by: Philadelphia Warriors
- Playing career: 1954–1968
- Position: Point guard
- Number: 5, 18, 15, 6, 21
- Coaching career: 1968–1987

Career history

Playing
- 1954–1957: Philadelphia Warriors
- 1957–1965: Syracuse Nationals / Philadelphia 76ers
- 1965–1966: Wilkes-Barre Barons
- 1966–1968: Philadelphia 76ers

Career highlights
- As player: NBA champion (1967); 6× NBA All-Star (1958–1962, 1965); All-NBA Second Team (1961); No. 69 retired by Niagara Purple Eagles; As coach: NBA champion (1971); 2× NBA All-Star Game head coach (1971, 1974)

Career NBA playing statistics
- Points: 8,622 (12.2 ppg)
- Rebounds: 2,705 (3.8 rpg)
- Assists: 3,215 (4.6 apg)
- Stats at NBA.com
- Stats at Basketball Reference

Career coaching record
- NBA: 430–300 (.589)
- Record at Basketball Reference
- Basketball Hall of Fame

Lawrence Ronald Costello (July 2, 1931 – December 13, 2001) was an American professional basketball player and coach. He played for the Philadelphia Warriors and the Syracuse Nationals / Philadelphia 76ers of the NBA, and the Wilkes-Barre Barons of the EPBL. He served as head coach of the Milwaukee Bucks and the Chicago Bulls.

A six-time All-Star, Costello was one of the National Basketball Association's last two-handed set shooters. As the inaugural coach of the Bucks, he led them to a championship in their third season of existence in 1971, the fastest run for an expansion team in NBA history. In ten seasons as a coach, Costello reached the postseason six times, while winning 37 of his 60 postseason games as coach, for a winning percentage of 61.7%, tenth best in NBA history (through the 2024–2025 season). In 2022, Costello was inducted into the Naismith Basketball Hall of Fame as a contributor.

== Early life ==
Costello was born on July 2, 1931, in Minoa, Onondaga County, New York, to Hubert and Ethel Costello. Both of his parents had excelled as basketball players, Hubert at Holy Rosary school in Syracuse and Ethel at Minoa High. Known as Ronnie in his youth, Costello attended East Syracuse-Minoa High School, where he starred in basketball, baseball, track and six-man football. He averaged approximately 24 points per game on the basketball team over his high school career.

== Playing career ==
=== Niagara University ===
Costello attended Niagara University, where he starred on the basketball team. His teammates included, among others, future Hall of Fame coach Hubie Brown, and future NBA coach Frank Layden.

Costello played three seasons at Niagara, from 1951 to 1954, after spending his freshman year on the freshman team due to the NCAA rules of the time. He led the freshman team to a perfect 23–0 record. As a junior he averaged 18.2 points and 3.9 rebounds per game, and 15.3 points and 2.2 rebounds per game as a senior. Niagara was a member of the men's Western New York Little Three Conference, which he led in scoring in the 1952–53 and 1953–54 seasons. Costello graduated as the all-time leading scorer (1,275) in program history (he now ranks in the top thirty). He was an All-America honorable mention in 1953.

Costello led the Purple Eagles to the National Invitational Tournament in 1953, losing to eventual champion Seton Hall led by Walter Dukes, 79–74. Costello scored a team-leading 20 points in the game. Niagara and Costello went to the NIT again in 1954, where they won two of three games, and finished third in the tournament, defeating Western Kentucky 71–65 in the consolation game. Costello scored 17 points and excelled in all aspects of the game. The 1952–53 team finished with a 22–6 record, and the 1953–54 team had a 24–6 record, and was ranked No. 16 in the final Associated Press (AP) poll among college teams.

He wore the jersey number of 24 until his senior season due to his efforts in a notable game in his junior year. Against Siena on February 21, 1953, Costello played all but twenty seconds of a six-overtime game that ran for 69 minutes, where he scored 21 points in an 88–81 win. Teammate Ed Fleming played all 70 minutes. To commemorate Costello's efforts in the longest college basketball game at that time (now tied for second longest to the seven-overtime December 1981 Cincinnati v. Bradley game), his jersey number was switched to 69. His jersey number of 69 was retired by Niagara in 2001.

=== Philadelphia Warriors and military service ===
Costello was drafted in the second round of the 1954 NBA draft (12th overall) by the Philadelphia Warriors. He chose the NBA over study at the University of Buffalo and their dental school due to having more of a passion for basketball. Costello played in only 19 games before entering the military during the season, and served in Korea during the following season (1955–56), before returning to the Warriors for the 1956–57 season. During his time overseas, the Warriors won the NBA title in 1955–56. Costello averaged 7.6 points, 3.3 assists and 4.5 rebounds in over 29 minutes per game at point guard in his first full year (1956–57), on a team that included future Hall of Fame players Paul Arizin and Neil Johnston.

=== Syracuse Nationals/Philadelphia 76ers ===
In October 1957, the Warriors sold Costello's contract rights to the Syracuse Nationals for $5,000. Costello was named an All-Star five consecutive seasons in Syracuse (1957–62) and once more after the team became the Philadelphia 76ers (1964–65). He averaged over ten points a game in each of his first eight seasons with the team.

In his first Nationals' season, Costello averaged 14.9 points, 4.4 assists and 5.3 rebounds per game at point guard, playing alongside future Hall of Famer Dolph Schayes and multi-time all-star Johnny "Red" Kerr. Costello, Schayes and Kerr would play together on the Nationals/76ers for seven years. The following season (1958–59), Costello was 7th in NBA most valuable player voting.

Costello averaged a career-high 15.8 points, to go along with 5.4 assists and 5.2 rebounds per game. The Nationals lost three games to four against the Boston Celtics in the 1959 Eastern division finals. Costello averaged 18 points and 6.3 rebounds per game in the series. Costello, Schayes and Kerr were joined in 1958 by future Hall of Fame guard Hal Greer, who would play with Costello for the rest of Costello's NBA playing career.

In 1959–60, Costello averaged a career-high 6.3 assists, to go along with 14 points and 5.5 rebounds per game. The Nationals lost to Wilt Chamberlain and the Philadelphia Warriors in the three-game Eastern Division semifinal playoffs. Costello averaged 16.7 points, 6.7 assists and 4.7 rebounds per game in the series. Costello was named second-team All-NBA for the 1960–61 season. He averaged 14.5 points, 5.5 assists and 3.9 rebounds per game during the regular season. The Nationals swept the Warriors (3–0) in the semifinals, but lost to the Celtics again in the Eastern Division Finals. Costello led the Nationals by averaging 24 points and 8.3 assists per game against the Warriors; but averaged 11.6 points and 5.4 assists against the Celtics.

In 1961–62, his final All-Star season as a National, Costello averaged 13.8 points, 5.7 assists and 3.9 rebounds per game. The Nationals lost in the five-game Eastern Division semifinals to the Warriors, where Costello averaged 14.6 points and 5.6 assists per game (with Chamberlain averaging 37 points and 26.2 rebounds playing 48 minutes per game). In 1962–63, the team's final year in Syracuse, he had a Nationals' personal career-low in minutes played, and had his lowest point and assist totals in six years. He did lead the NBA in free throw percentage.

During the team's first season in Philadelphia (1963–64), he was sharing time at point guard with Paul Neumann, under new head coach Dolph Schayes, who had replaced the Nationals’ future Hall of fame coach Alex Hannum when the team moved to Philadelphia. The franchise had its worst record since Costello had joined the team.

The 76ers obtained Wilt Chamberlain in a January 1965 trade with the Warriors, and Costello became an All-Star again in the 1964–65 season. He played over 30 minutes per game for the first time since 1959–60, averaging 13.5 points and 4.3 assists per game. Costello led the NBA in free throw percentage for a second time. However, he suffered a hamstring injury toward the end of the season and missed considerable playing time. He came back for the playoffs, but was hampered by the injury. The 76ers lost the Eastern Division finals to the Celtics in a seven-game series, losing the final game 110–109. Costello averaged 25.1 minutes per game, 6.6 points and 2.6 assists in that series.

Costello announced his retirement from the 76ers at the end of the 1964–65 season. After retiring, he took a position teaching physical education and coaching basketball at his alma mater East Syracuse Minoa High School (including teaching his players Costello's two-handed set shot). He also joined the Wilkes-Barre Barons of the Eastern Professional Basketball League (EPBL), with which he played on weekends. He averaged 38 minutes per game, and had no problems with his previously injured leg.

Costello rejoined the 76ers as a reserve point guard for the 1966–67 NBA season, after returning head coach Alex Hannum reached out to Costello and told him the 76ers needed a veteran point guard after the retirement of Al Bianchi. It was anticipated that Greer and Wally (later Wali) Jones would handle primary point guard responsibilities; but Costello would provide stability with his defense and experience. During the season, the balance of minutes between Jones and Costello would vary, with sometimes Jones playing more and sometimes Costello.

The team finished the season 68–13, defeated the Boston Celtics in the Eastern Division finals, breaking Boston's eight-year streak of NBA championships; and then defeated the now San Francisco Warriors in the NBA Finals. The 1966-67 76ers team (that included Hall of Famers Chamberlain, Greer, Billy Cunningham and Chet Walker) is considered one of the greatest teams in NBA history. The 35-year old Costello averaged nearly 20-minutes per game, and 7.8 points, 2.9 assists and 2.1 rebounds per game in the regular season.

In early January 1967, Costello suffered torn knee ligaments that kept him out of play until mid-March; and he played in only 49 regular season games. Soon after returning in March, Costello suffered further knee ligament damage early in the semifinal playoff series against the Cincinnati Royals, and missed the rest of the 1967 playoffs against the Royals, Celtics and Warriors. While many attributed the team's success to Costello, Costello believed it was all the players working together, and Hannum's ability to get the most out of his players, that led to the 76ers dominant season.

Costello returned to the 76ers for the 1967–68 season. He was the oldest player in the NBA. He was averaging nearly 18 minutes per game when he suffered a ruptured Achilles tendon in his left foot during the 28th game of the season against the Baltimore Bullets, requiring surgery. Costello ended his career for the second and final time as a player, when he announced his retirement on December 24, 1967.

=== Career ===
Over his career, Costello averaged 12.2 points, 3.8 rebounds and 4.6 assists in 706 regular season NBA games. He appeared in 52 playoff games, averaging 11.4 points, 3.1 rebounds and 4 assists in 18 minutes per game.

Although only 6 ft 1 in (1.85 m), Costello was considered a tough defensive player. Hall of Fame guard Bob Cousy of the Boston Celtics called Costello his most difficult opponent because of his "animal determination". Knicks Hall of Fame guard and coach Dick McGuire considered Costello one of the best guards of his era. Costello was one of the last players in the NBA to use a two-handed set shot (the last person to use that technique in an NBA game being Hall of fame guard Richie Guerin.) He was also known for his crew-cut hair.

During his NBA career, Costello was selected to six NBA All-Star Games (playing in five). He led the league in free throw percentage in the 1962–63 and 1964–65 seasons.

== Coaching career ==
Costello began his coaching career at East Syracuse-Minoa High School, his alma mater, during his first NBA retirement in 1965.

=== Milwaukee Bucks ===
Costello took over as the first head coach of the expansion team Milwaukee Bucks in 1968, remaining head coach until November 1976. He finished with a 410–254 record, two NBA finals appearances and one NBA championship; reaching the playoffs in six out of the eight full seasons he coached the Bucks. He won 56 or more games in five consecutive seasons, and 60 or more in three consecutive seasons. Costello was known as a demanding coach and for his intensity; and would ask his players how many "really hard minutes" they could give him in a game. He was disciplined and gave great attention to detail, utilizing thick playbooks and meticulous preparation; and would quiz his players on the numerous plays in the playbook.

Costello was one of "the first NBA coaches to use a full-time bench assistant, and to scout future opponents." He was also one of the first coaches to employ videotape to analyze his team and opponents, and was having his players look at film to study other teams before other teams started using video study. Costello had a 35-page questionnaire that he provided to his scouts for them to garner and present the type of information that he wanted on opposing teams.

In that first season (1968–69), Costello coached the Bucks to a 27–55 record. The Bucks drafted future Hall of Fame center Kareem Abdul-Jabbar (then generally known as Lew Alcindor) with the overall first pick in the 1969 NBA draft, and selected future NBA Hall of Fame forward Bob Dandridge with their fourth-round pick. While Abdul-Jabbar was already an NCAA champion, All-American and college Player of the Year, who became an all-time NBA great, Costello saw Dandridge's ability and great potential, and his demanding coaching helped Dandridge develop into a great NBA player.

The 1969-70 Bucks improved by 29 games, with a regular season record of 56–26, finishing second in the Eastern Division. They reached the Eastern Division Finals, losing to the New York Knicks who would go on to win the 1970 NBA championship.

In April 1970, the Bucks traded 1970 All-Star guard Flynn Robinson and Charley Paulk to the Cincinnati Royals for future Hall of Fame guard, and one of the NBA's top all-time players, Oscar Robertson. Costello coached the 1970-71 Bucks to a league-best 66–16 record, including a then-NBA record (and still a team record) 20-game win streak; as well as a 16-game winning streak after losing their first game of the 1970–71 season. The Bucks won the NBA championship in the post-season with a 4–0 sweep of the Baltimore Bullets; after earlier defeating the San Francisco Warriors and Los Angeles Lakers four games to one in each of their earlier playoff series.

Winning the 1971 championship only three years since the Bucks inception is the least amount of time from entering the league that an expansion team has ever taken to win an NBA championship. Dandridge and the team's first All-Star Jon McGlocklin believed the Bucks could have exceeded Costello's 76ers 68-win season, but Costello rested his players so they would be ready for the playoffs; though others thought the team just lowered its intensity in light of their superior record and the regular season coming to an end. (Over the last six regular season games, the Bucks were 1–5, with Abdul-Jabbar playing over 40 minutes in four of those games.) Dandridge also believed Costello's experience playing for the 76ers during their peak years helped Costello understand how to be a better at coaching the Bucks.

The Bucks finished with a 63–19 record in 1971–72, second best to the 69–13 Lakers of Wilt Chamberlain and Jerry West, who set the all-time NBA record of 33 consecutive wins in a season. Abdul-Jabbar was voted the NBA's Most Valuable Player, just ahead of West and Chamberlain. The Bucks lost to the Lakers four games to two in the Western Conference Finals.

The Bucks were 60–22 the following season (1972–73), but lost to the 47–35 Golden State Warriors in the first round of the playoffs. Niagara teammate Hubie Brown became Costello's assistant coach that season, Brown's first NBA coaching job. The Bucks won a league best 59 games during the 1973–74 regular season and returned to the NBA Finals, where they lost to the Boston Celtics in seven games.

Bucks guard Lucius Allen had finished the 1973–74 season 15th in most valuable player voting, averaging 17.6 points, 5.2 assists and 1.9 steals per game; playing in the backcourt with Robertson. However, Allen was injured and did not play in the 1974 playoffs, putting the Bucks at a disadvantage, and allowing the Celtics to pressure the 35-year old Robertson in the absence of the speedy Allen. Abdul-Jabbar, also Allen's UCLA teammate, believed the Bucks would have won the series but for the loss of Allen and Robertson not being at full strength.

Robertson retired in September 1974. The Bucks finished the 1974–75 season with their worst record since their initial expansion season (38–44), and did not make the playoffs. In 1975, Abdul-Jabbar demanded a trade. Though the Bucks did not want to trade him, general manager Wayne Embry (who had played a year under Costello with the Bucks before joining the front office) believed he had no choice and traded Abdul-Jabbar and Walt Wesley to the Los Angeles Lakers for Elmore Smith, Dave Meyers, Brian Winters, and Junior Bridgeman. The team again finished 38–44, and lost in the first round of the playoffs.

After a 3–15 start in the 1976–77 season, Costello resigned on November 22, 1976. He resigned along with general manager Embry (who stayed on with the team in other capacities), after they had fallen out of favor with team president James Fitzgerald who believed they should not have relented in trading Abdul-Jabbar. Embry also believed that Costello's strict coaching style was making it more difficult for Costello in an era of changing player expectations of how coaches should behave. Costello was replaced by Don Nelson, who would be head coach of the Bucks for 11 seasons.

=== Chicago Bulls and Milwaukee Does ===
Costello coached the Chicago Bulls for 56 games in 1978–79, before being fired and replaced by Scotty Robertson as interim head coach. He returned to Milwaukee to coach the Milwaukee Does of the Women's Professional Basketball League for part of the 1979–80 season.

=== Utica College ===
Costello's last coaching job was at Utica College in the 1980s. The school was making the transition from Division III to Division I as an independent. Costello coached one season in Division III (1980–81). He went from a record of 4–22 in his first Division I season (1981–82) to 11–15 the next two seasons (1982–84), and then to 15–12 or 16–12 in his fourth Division I season (1984–85). In his second year in Division I, the Pioneers were the seventh most improved team in the country based on their won-loss record. Costello retired in 1987, having won 64 or 65 games at Utica in six seasons as a Division I school, with a record of 77–106 for all seven of his years coaching at Utica.

== Honors ==
In 2022, Costello was inducted into the Naismith Basketball Hall of Fame as a contributor.

He was named Syracuse Athlete of the Year in 1960. In 1964, he was inducted into the Niagara University Athletics Hall of Honor. He was inducted into the Greater Syracuse Sports Hall of Fame in 1988. In 1998, he was inducted into the Greater Buffalo Sports Hall of Fame. He is also a member of the New York State Hall of Fame.

== Later life ==
Costello appeared on NBA Live videogame series, as member of the 1950s NBA Live Legend All-Stars Team.

Costello was featured in the book Basketball History in Syracuse, Hoops Roots by author Mark Allen Baker published by The History Press in 2010. The book is an introduction to professional basketball in Syracuse and includes teams like (Vic Hanson's) All-Americans, the Syracuse Reds and the Syracuse Nationals (1946–1963).

== Death ==
Costello died on December 13, 2001, after battling cancer for more than a year. He was survived by his wife, four daughters and three grandchildren.

== NBA career statistics ==
Legend
GP	Games played	GS	Games started	MPG	Minutes per game
FG%	Field goal percentage	3P%	3-point field goal percentage	FT%	Free throw percentage
RPG	Rebounds per game	APG	Assists per game	SPG	Steals per game
BPG	Blocks per game	PPG	Points per game	**Bold**	Career high
†	Won an NBA championship	*	Led the league

=== Regular season ===
Year	Team	GP	MPG	FG%	FT%	RPG	APG	PPG
1954–55	Philadelphia	19	24.4	.331	.813	2.6	4.1	6.2
1956–57	Philadelphia	72	29.3	.374	.788	4.5	3.3	7.6
1957–58	Syracuse	72	38.1	.426	.847	5.3	4.4	14.9
1958–59	Syracuse	70	**39.3**	.437	.802	5.2	5.4	**15.8**
1959–60	Syracuse	71	34.8	.453	.862	**5.5**	**6.3**	14.0
1960–61	Syracuse	75	28.9	**.482**	.799	3.9	5.5	14.5
1961–62	Syracuse	63	29.4	.427	.837	3.9	5.7	13.8
1962–63	Syracuse	78	26.5	.432	.881*	3.0	4.3	11.0
1963–64	Philadelphia	45	25.3	.468	.865	2.3	3.7	11.8
1964–65	Philadelphia	64	30.7	.445	.877*	2.6	4.3	13.5
1966–67†	Philadelphia	49	19.9	.444	**.902**	2.1	2.9	7.8
1967–68	Philadelphia	28	17.6	.453	.827	1.8	2.4	7.2
Career		706	30.0	.438	.841	3.8	4.6	12.2
All-Star		5	14.2	.344	1.000	1.8	2.2	4.8

=== Playoffs ===
Year	Team	GP	MPG	FG%	FT%	RPG	APG	PPG
1957	Philadelphia	2	8.0	.375	.000	2.5	1.0	3.0
1958	Syracuse	3	**44.7**	.294	**1.000**	**8.3**	4.0	11.3
1959	Syracuse	9	40.1	.446	.836	5.9	6.0	**17.7**
1960	Syracuse	3	40.7	.426	.833	4.7	**6.7**	16.7
1961	Syracuse	8	33.6	.408	.855	4.4	6.5	16.4
1962	Syracuse	5	33.4	.431	.879	3.2	5.6	14.6
1963	Syracuse	5	26.8	.432	.826	0.8	4.6	10.2
1964	Philadelphia	5	7.2	.214	**1.000**	0.6	0.8	3.2
1965	Philadelphia	**10**	20.7	.415	.688	1.2	2.0	5.5
1967†	Philadelphia	2	12.5	**.750**	**1.000**	2.0	1.5	8.5
Career		52	28.3	.416	.852	3.3	4.2	11.4

== Head coaching record ==
Legend
Regular season	G	Games coached	W	Games won	L	Games lost	W–L %	Win–loss %
Playoffs	PG	Playoff games	PW	Playoff wins	PL	Playoff losses	PW–L %	Playoff win–loss %

Team	Year	G	W	L	W–L%	Finish	PG	PW	PL	PW–L%	Result
Milwaukee	1968–69	82	27	55	.329	7th in Eastern	—	—	—	—	Missed Playoffs
Milwaukee	1969–70	82	56	26	.683	2nd in Eastern	10	5	5	.500	Lost in Conference semifinals
Milwaukee	1970–71	82	66	16	..805	2nd in Midwest	14	12	2	.857	Won NBA Championship
Milwaukee	1971–72	82	63	19	.768	1st in Midwest	7	6	5	.545	Lost in Conference finals
Milwaukee	1972–73	82	60	22	.732	1st in Midwest	6	2	4	.333	Lost in Conference semifinals
Milwaukee	1973–74	82	59	23	.720	1st in Midwest	16	11	5	.688	Lost in NBA Finals
Milwaukee	1974–75	82	38	44	.463	4th in Midwest	—	—	—	—	Missed Playoffs
Milwaukee	1975–76	82	38	44	.463	1st in Midwest	3	1	2	.333	Lost in First round
Milwaukee	1976–77	18	3	15	.167	(resigned)	-	-	-	–	－
Chicago	1978–79	56	20	36	.357	(fired)	-	-	-	–	－
Career		730	430	300	.589		60	37	23	.617	
