= 1973–74 Milwaukee Bucks season =

NBA professional basketball team season

- Conference champions
- Division champions
- Head coach: Larry Costello
- President: John Steinmiller (vice)
- General manager: Wayne Embry
- Owners: Milwaukee Professional Sports and Services, Inc. (Milwaukee Pro)
- Arena: Milwaukee Arena

Results
- Record: 59–23 (.720)
- Place: Division: 1st (Midwest); Conference: 1st (Western)
- Playoff finish: NBA Finals (lost to Celtics 3–4)
- Stats at Basketball Reference

Local media
- Television: WISN-TV
- Radio: WTMJ

The 1973–74 Milwaukee Bucks season was the sixth season for the Bucks. It would also be Oscar Robertson's last season in the league. This would be the most recent season that the Bucks clinch the best record in the league until the 2018–19 NBA season. It was also the last time the Bucks would be conference champions until the 2020–21 NBA season.

== Draft picks ==
Round	Pick	Player	Position	Nationality	School/Club team
1	16	Swen Nater	C	Netherlands	UCLA
4	59	Clyde Turner		United States	Minnesota
4	67	Harry Rogers		United States	St. Louis
5	85	Larry Jackson		United States	Northern Illinois
6	101	James Floyd		United States	Shaw
7	119	Eddie Childress		United States	Austin Peay State
8	135	Walter McGrary		United States	Tennessee-Chattanooga
9	150	Bob Vacca		United States	Quinnipiac
10	164	Ron Battle		United States	Sam Houston State

== Roster ==
1973–74 Milwaukee Bucks roster
Players

Pos.	No.	Player	Height	Weight	DOB	From
C	33	Kareem Abdul-Jabbar	7 ft 2 in (2.18 m)	225 lb (102 kg)	1947–04–16	UCLA
G	42	Lucius Allen (injured)	6 ft 2 in (1.88 m)	175 lb (79 kg)	1947–09–26	UCLA
C	19	Dick Cunningham	6 ft 10 in (2.08 m)	245 lb (111 kg)	1946–07–11	Murray State
F	10	Bob Dandridge	6 ft 6 in (1.98 m)	195 lb (88 kg)	1947–11–15	Norfolk State
G	20	Mickey Davis	6 ft 7 in (2.01 m)	195 lb (88 kg)	1950–06–16	Duquesne
F	7	Terry Driscoll	6 ft 7 in (2.01 m)	215 lb (98 kg)	1947–08–28	Boston College
G	24	Dick Garrett	6 ft 3 in (1.91 m)	185 lb (84 kg)	1947–01–31	Southern Illinois
F	21	Russ Lee	6 ft 5 in (1.96 m)	185 lb (84 kg)	1950–01–27	Marshall
G	14	Jon McGlocklin	6 ft 5 in (1.96 m)	205 lb (93 kg)	1943–06–10	Indiana
F	18	Curtis Perry	6 ft 7 in (2.01 m)	215 lb (98 kg)	1948–09–13	Missouri State
G	1	Oscar Robertson	6 ft 5 in (1.96 m)	205 lb (93 kg)	1938–11–24	Cincinnati
C	35	Cornell Warner	6 ft 9 in (2.06 m)	220 lb (100 kg)	1948–08–12	Jackson State
G	12	Ron Williams	6 ft 3 in (1.91 m)	188 lb (85 kg)	1944–09–24	West Virginia

Coaches
Head coach
- Larry Costello
Assistant(s)
- Hubie Brown

Legend
- (DP) Unsigned draft pick
- (FA) Free agent
- (S) Suspended
- Injured

Roster
Updated: January 8, 1974

== Regular season ==
=== Season standings ===
Midwest Division	W	L	PCT	GB	Home	Road	Neutral	Div
y-Milwaukee Bucks	59	23	.720	–	31–7	24–16	4–0	14–6
x-Chicago Bulls	54	28	.659	5	32–9	21–19	1–0	13–7
x-Detroit Pistons	52	30	.634	7	29–12	23–17	0–1	9–11
Kansas City–Omaha Kings	33	49	.402	26	20–21	13–28	–	4–16

#	Western Conference				
#	Team	W	L	PCT	GB
1	z-Milwaukee Bucks	59	23	.720	–
2	x-Chicago Bulls	54	28	.659	5
3	x-Detroit Pistons	52	30	.634	7
4	y-Los Angeles Lakers	47	35	.573	12
5	Golden State Warriors	44	38	.537	15
6	Seattle SuperSonics	36	46	.439	23
7	Kansas City–Omaha Kings	33	49	.402	26
8	Phoenix Suns	30	52	.366	29
9	Portland Trail Blazers	27	55	.329	32

=== Game log ===
1973–74 game log
Total: 59–23 (home: 31–7; road: 24–16; Neutral: 4–0)
October: 9–1 (home: 4–0; road: 5–1)

Game	Date	Team	Score	High points	High rebounds	High assists	Location Attendance	Record
1	October 12, 1973	@ Phoenix	W 107–84	Bob Dandridge (24)	Kareem Abdul-Jabbar (17)	Lucius Allen (7)	Arizona Veterans Memorial Coliseum; 9,033	1–0
2	October 13, 1973	@ Golden State	W 97–85	Kareem Abdul-Jabbar (29)	Kareem Abdul-Jabbar (13)	Lucius Allen (8)	Oakland-Alameda County Coliseum Arena; 6,596	2–0
3	October 14, 1973	@ Seattle	L 100–109	Bob Dandridge (24)	Kareem Abdul-Jabbar (14)	Oscar Robertson (9)	Seattle Center Coliseum; 11,240	2–1
4	October 17, 1973	Golden State	W 95–109	Kareem Abdul-Jabbar (22)	Kareem Abdul-Jabbar (11)	Lucius Allen (8)	Milwaukee Arena; 9,189	3–1
5	October 19, 1973	@ Detroit	W 96–94	Kareem Abdul-Jabbar (20)	Kareem Abdul-Jabbar (12)	Oscar Robertson (8)	Cobo Arena; 10,645	4–1
6	October 20, 1973	Cleveland	W 88–101	Kareem Abdul-Jabbar (33)	Curtis Perry (11)	Oscar Robertson (7)	Milwaukee Arena; 8,837	5–1
7	October 24, 1973	Buffalo	W 113–130	Kareem Abdul-Jabbar (31)	Kareem Abdul-Jabbar (21)	Dandridge, Robertson (8)	Milwaukee Arena; 8,309	6–1
8	October 26, 1973	@ Philadelphia	W 98–92	Kareem Abdul-Jabbar (35)	Kareem Abdul-Jabbar (18)	Oscar Robertson (7)	Spectrum; 5,897	7–1
9	October 27, 1973	Phoenix	W 95–104	Lucius Allen (23)	Kareem Abdul-Jabbar (12)	Oscar Robertson (8)	Milwaukee Arena; 9,975	8–1
10	October 30, 1973	@ Kansas City–Omaha	W 112–78	Lucius Allen (26)	Kareem Abdul-Jabbar (9)	Kareem Abdul-Jabbar (5)	Kemper Arena; 5,540	9–1

November: 12–3 (home: 8–1; road: 4–2)

Game	Date	Team	Score	High points	High rebounds	High assists	Location Attendance	Record
11	November 2, 1973	@ Cleveland	W 118–100	Kareem Abdul-Jabbar (35)	Kareem Abdul-Jabbar (16)	Kareem Abdul-Jabbar (11)	Cleveland Arena; 5,361	10–1
12	November 3, 1973	Detroit	W 115–123 (OT)	Bob Dandridge (31)	Kareem Abdul-Jabbar (16)	Lucius Allen (12)	Milwaukee Arena; 10,938	11–1
13	November 7, 1973	Los Angeles	W 92–109	Kareem Abdul-Jabbar (22)	Kareem Abdul-Jabbar (21)	Oscar Robertson (7)	Milwaukee Arena; 10,938	12–1
14	November 10, 1973	Kansas City–Omaha	W 83–84	Kareem Abdul-Jabbar (19)	Kareem Abdul-Jabbar (19)	Kareem Abdul-Jabbar (7)	Milwaukee Arena; 8,725	13–1
15	November 11, 1973	@ Capital	W 110–91	Abdul-Jabbar, Robertson (24)	Kareem Abdul-Jabbar (19)	Abdul-Jabbar, Allen (7)	Cole Field House; 11,638	14–1
16	November 13, 1973	Portland	W 100–108	Lucius Allen (29)	Kareem Abdul-Jabbar (16)	Oscar Robertson (8)	Milwaukee Arena; 8,531	15–1
17	November 16, 1973	@ Boston	L 90–105	Kareem Abdul-Jabbar (28)	Kareem Abdul-Jabbar (9)	Kareem Abdul-Jabbar (6)	Boston Garden; 15,320	15–2
18	November 17, 1973	@ New York	L 93–100	Kareem Abdul-Jabbar (24)	Kareem Abdul-Jabbar (15)	Oscar Robertson (6)	Madison Square Garden; 19,694	15–3
19	November 20, 1973	Golden State	L 108–105	Abdul-Jabbar, Dandridge (20)	Kareem Abdul-Jabbar (11)	Oscar Robertson (13)	Milwaukee Arena; 9,975	15–4
20	November 22, 1973	New York	W 91–107	Lucius Allen (27)	Curtis Perry (17)	Abdul-Jabbar, Allen (4)	Milwaukee Arena; 10,938	16–4
21	November 24, 1973	@ Atlanta	W 112–92	Bob Dandridge (30)	Kareem Abdul-Jabbar (21)	Oscar Robertson (10)	The Omni; 9,111	17–4
22	November 25, 1973	Philadelphia	W 96–105	Kareem Abdul-Jabbar (31)	Kareem Abdul-Jabbar (17)	Lucius Allen (7)	Milwaukee Arena; 8,103	18–4
23	November 27, 1973	@ Buffalo	W 115–110	Kareem Abdul-Jabbar (36)	Kareem Abdul-Jabbar (16)	Lucius Allen (9)	Buffalo Memorial Auditorium; 8,169	19–4
24	November 28, 1973	Seattle	W 93–127	Kareem Abdul-Jabbar (32)	Bob Dandridge (16)	Abdul-Jabbar, Robertson (8)	Milwaukee Arena; 8,289	20–4
25	November 30, 1973	Boston	W 93–117	Bob Dandridge (27)	Kareem Abdul-Jabbar (14)	Oscar Robertson (10)	Milwaukee Arena; 10,938	21–4

December: 9–4 (home: 6–2; road: 3–2)

Game	Date	Team	Score	High points	High rebounds	High assists	Location Attendance	Record
26	December 4, 1973	Houston	W 109–124	Kareem Abdul-Jabbar (32)	Curtis Perry (17)	Abdul-Jabbar, Perry (7)	Milwaukee Arena; 7,889	22–4
27	December 7, 1973	Portland	W 86–116	Allen, Dandridge (25)	Kareem Abdul-Jabbar (15)	Oscar Robertson (10)	Milwaukee Arena; 8,796	23–4
28	December 8, 1973	@ Philadelphia	W 105–92	Lucius Allen (21)	Cornell Warner (12)	Lucius Allen (6)	Spectrum; 6,012	24–4
29	December 11, 1973	Seattle	W 91–130	Lucius Allen (28)	Curtis Perry (16)	Oscar Robertson (9)	Milwaukee Arena; 7,075	25–4
30	December 13, 1973	Chicago	L 97–94	Kareem Abdul-Jabbar (23)	Kareem Abdul-Jabbar (15)	Oscar Robertson (13)	Milwaukee Arena; 10,938	25–5
31	December 15, 1973	Atlanta	W 82–116	Abdul-Jabbar, Dandridge (21)	Kareem Abdul-Jabbar (12)	Oscar Robertson (10)	Milwaukee Arena; 9,785	26–5
32	December 16, 1973	@ Portland	W 121–98	Kareem Abdul-Jabbar (32)	Curtis Perry (13)	Oscar Robertson (7)	Memorial Coliseum; 9,034	27–5
33	December 18, 1973	@ Los Angeles	L 107–109	Kareem Abdul-Jabbar (37)	Kareem Abdul-Jabbar (24)	Oscar Robertson (9)	The Forum; 15,143	27–6
34	December 22, 1973	@ Phoenix	L 112–121	Kareem Abdul-Jabbar (21)	Curtis Perry (20)	Kareem Abdul-Jabbar (8)	Arizona Veterans Memorial Coliseum; 8,013	27–7
35	December 26, 1973	Cleveland	W 110–123	Kareem Abdul-Jabbar (38)	Curtis Perry (19)	Lucius Allen (10)	Milwaukee Arena; 9,986	28–7
36	December 27, 1973	Philadelphia	W 107–129	Kareem Abdul-Jabbar (26)	Kareem Abdul-Jabbar (14)	Jon McGlocklin (9)	Milwaukee Arena; 9,267	29–7
37	December 28, 1973	@ Houston	W 127–111	Bob Dandridge (32)	Kareem Abdul-Jabbar (16)	Abdul-Jabbar, McGlocklin (9)	Hofheinz Pavilion; 5,743	30–7
38	December 30, 1973	Detroit	L 98–91	Kareem Abdul-Jabbar (30)	Curtis Perry (15)	Lucius Allen (7)	Milwaukee Arena; 10,938	30–8

January: 10–3 (home: 7–0; road: 3–3)

Game	Date	Team	Score	High points	High rebounds	High assists	Location Attendance	Record
39	January 2, 1974	@ Detroit	L 92–106	Lucius Allen (39)	Kareem Abdul-Jabbar (9)	Kareem Abdul-Jabbar (8)	Cobo Arena; 10,513	30–9
40	January 3, 1974	Kansas City–Omaha	W 105–120	Kareem Abdul-Jabbar (38)	Kareem Abdul-Jabbar (16)	Lucius Allen (9)	Milwaukee Arena; 9,936	31–9
41	January 5, 1974	Phoenix	W 109–118	Kareem Abdul-Jabbar (34)	Kareem Abdul-Jabbar (13)	Lucius Allen (8)	Milwaukee Arena; 9,812	32–9
42	January 6, 1974	@ Capital	L 88–90	Kareem Abdul-Jabbar (25)	Kareem Abdul-Jabbar (15)	Ron Williams (7)	Capital Centre; 17,246	32–10
43	January 11, 1974	Capital	W 113–115 (OT)	Kareem Abdul-Jabbar (34)	Kareem Abdul-Jabbar (22)	McGlocklin, Williams (6)	Milwaukee Arena; 9,683	33–10
44	January 12, 1974	@ Chicago	W 101–82	Lucius Allen (24)	Kareem Abdul-Jabbar (23)	Lucius Allen (11)	Chicago Stadium; 18,597	34–10
45	January 13, 1974	Chicago	W 94–124	Kareem Abdul-Jabbar (23)	Kareem Abdul-Jabbar (11)	Lucius Allen (11)	Milwaukee Arena; 10,938	35–10
46	January 19, 1974	Portland	W 106–121	Kareem Abdul-Jabbar (34)	Curtis Perry (16)	Jon McGlocklin (7)	Milwaukee Arena; 9,687	36–10
47	January 20, 1974	Los Angeles	W 90–94	Kareem Abdul-Jabbar (39)	Kareem Abdul-Jabbar (22)	Allen, McGlocklin (6)	Milwaukee Arena; 10,938	37–10
48	January 23, 1974	N Buffalo	W 114–88	Kareem Abdul-Jabbar (38)	Kareem Abdul-Jabbar (12)	Abdul-Jabbar, Robertson (7)	Wisconsin Field House; 7,325	38–10
49	January 25, 1974	@ Phoenix	W 112–108	Kareem Abdul-Jabbar (31)	Kareem Abdul-Jabbar (17)	Kareem Abdul-Jabbar (10)	Arizona Veterans Memorial Coliseum; 7,660	39–10
50	January 27, 1974	@ Los Angeles	L 92–99	Kareem Abdul-Jabbar (25)	Kareem Abdul-Jabbar (24)	McGlocklin, Robertson (7)	The Forum; 17,505	39–11
51	January 29, 1974	@ Portland	W 126–106	Kareem Abdul-Jabbar (25)	Curtis Perry (16)	Lucius Allen (10)	Memorial Coliseum; 6,501	40–11

February: 9–7 (home: 4–3; road: 5–4)

Game	Date	Team	Score	High points	High rebounds	High assists	Location Attendance	Record
52	February 1, 1974	@ Seattle	L 85–110	Abdul-Jabbar, Dandridge (18)	Kareem Abdul-Jabbar (16)	Kareem Abdul-Jabbar (6)	Seattle Center Coliseum; 14,017	40–12
53	February 2, 1974	@ Golden State	L 91–120	Kareem Abdul-Jabbar (23)	Kareem Abdul-Jabbar (12)	McGlocklin, Robertson (5)	Oakland-Alameda County Coliseum Arena; 11,606	40–13
54	February 5, 1974	@ Cleveland	W 102–87	Kareem Abdul-Jabbar (33)	Kareem Abdul-Jabbar (18)	Lucius Allen (10)	Cleveland Arena; 5,291	41–13
55	February 6, 1974	Boston	L 105–104	Kareem Abdul-Jabbar (32)	Kareem Abdul-Jabbar (13)	Kareem Abdul-Jabbar (6)	Milwaukee Arena; 10,938	41–14
56	February 8, 1974	Capital	W 96–105	Lucius Allen (28)	Cornell Warner (19)	Oscar Robertson (5)	Milwaukee Arena; 10,121	42–14
57	February 10, 1974	N Boston	W 95–86	Kareem Abdul-Jabbar (28)	Kareem Abdul-Jabbar (21)	Kareem Abdul-Jabbar (4)	Providence Civic Center; 11,671	43–14
58	February 12, 1974	@ Chicago	L 81–93	Kareem Abdul-Jabbar (30)	Kareem Abdul-Jabbar (15)	Jon McGlocklin (7)	Chicago Stadium; 16,487	43–15
59	February 14, 1974	@ Detroit	W 102–99	Kareem Abdul-Jabbar (27)	Oscar Robertson (10)	Oscar Robertson (9)	Cobo Arena; 11,385	44–15
60	February 15, 1974	Chicago	L 92–90	Kareem Abdul-Jabbar (27)	Bob Dandridge (14)	Jon McGlocklin (5)	Milwaukee Arena; 10,938	44–16
61	February 17, 1974	New York	W 86–97	Kareem Abdul-Jabbar (32)	Kareem Abdul-Jabbar (23)	Abdul-Jabbar, Robertson (6)	Milwaukee Arena; 10,938	45–16
62	February 19, 1974	@ Buffalo	L 109–145	Kareem Abdul-Jabbar (38)	Kareem Abdul-Jabbar (11)	Lucius Allen (8)	Buffalo Memorial Auditorium; 15,676	45–17
63	February 20, 1974	N Atlanta	W 110–94	Kareem Abdul-Jabbar (32)	Curtis Perry (19)	Oscar Robertson (9)	Wisconsin Field House; 9,455	46–17
64	February 22, 1974	@ Houston	W 122–113	Kareem Abdul-Jabbar (38)	Curtis Perry (12)	Oscar Robertson (8)	Hofheinz Pavilion; 8,253	47–17
65	February 24, 1974	@ Kansas City–Omaha	W 100–93	Lucius Allen (31)	Curtis Perry (15)	Lucius Allen (6)	Kemper Arena; 8,849	48–17
66	February 27, 1974	Los Angeles	L 110–108	Kareem Abdul-Jabbar (33)	Kareem Abdul-Jabbar (16)	Lucius Allen (6)	Milwaukee Arena; 10,938	48–18
67	February 28, 1974	Detroit	W 90–113	Lucius Allen (27)	Curtis Perry (11)	Kareem Abdul-Jabbar (9)	Milwaukee Arena; 10,938	49–18

March: 10–5 (home: 5–1; road: 5–4)

Game	Date	Team	Score	High points	High rebounds	High assists	Location Attendance	Record
68	March 1, 1974	@ Atlanta	L 89–105	Ron Williams (16)	Kareem Abdul-Jabbar (11)	Lucius Allen (5)	The Omni; 8,470	49–19
69	March 2, 1974	Seattle	W 99–116	Kareem Abdul-Jabbar (31)	Kareem Abdul-Jabbar (15)	Oscar Robertson (9)	Milwaukee Arena; 10,938	50–19
70	March 3, 1974	N Houston	W 112–106 (OT)	Kareem Abdul-Jabbar (44)	Kareem Abdul-Jabbar (12)	Oscar Robertson (17)	Wisconsin Field House; 7,889	51–19
71	March 4, 1974	Kansas City–Omaha	W 103–109	Lucius Allen (21)	Abdul-Jabbar, Warner (12)	Lucius Allen (7)	Milwaukee Arena; 9,012	52–19
72	March 6, 1974	@ Kansas City–Omaha	W 111–99	Kareem Abdul-Jabbar (25)	Mickey Davis (16)	Lucius Allen (5)	Omaha Civic Auditorium; 7,182	53–19
73	March 7, 1974	Golden State	L 97–95	Lucius Allen (31)	Kareem Abdul-Jabbar (17)	Oscar Robertson (7)	Milwaukee Arena; 10,317	53–20
74	March 9, 1974	@ New York	L 75–88	Kareem Abdul-Jabbar (27)	Abdul-Jabbar, Allen (10)	Dandridge, Robertson (4)	Madison Square Garden; 19,694	53–21
75	March 11, 1974	Phoenix	W 92–105	Abdul-Jabbar, Allen (18)	Kareem Abdul-Jabbar (15)	Allen, Robertson (8)	Milwaukee Arena; 9,027	54–21
76	March 15, 1974	@ Detroit	L 89–93	Bob Dandridge (31)	Kareem Abdul-Jabbar (15)	Ron Williams (6)	Cobo Arena; 11,267	54–22
77	March 17, 1974	@ Chicago	W 107–82	Kareem Abdul-Jabbar (38)	Kareem Abdul-Jabbar (22)	Dandridge, Robertson (5)	Chicago Stadium; 18,542	55–22
78	March 19, 1974	@ Golden State	W 111–100	Kareem Abdul-Jabbar (31)	Abdul-Jabbar, Robertson (10)	Oscar Robertson (10)	Oakland-Alameda County Coliseum Arena; 11,365	56–22
79	March 20, 1974	@ Los Angeles	L 114–120	Kareem Abdul-Jabbar (27)	Kareem Abdul-Jabbar (17)	Oscar Robertson (9)	The Forum; 17,387	56–23
80	March 22, 1974	@ Seattle	W 106–101	Kareem Abdul-Jabbar (40)	Kareem Abdul-Jabbar (21)	Kareem Abdul-Jabbar (7)	Seattle Center Coliseum; 13,771	57–23
81	March 24, 1974	@ Portland	W 120–110	Kareem Abdul-Jabbar (43)	Kareem Abdul-Jabbar (13)	Dandridge, Robertson (10)	Memorial Coliseum; 7,709	58–23
82	March 26, 1974	Kansas City–Omaha	W 98–118	Bob Dandridge (23)	Cornell Warner (18)	Oscar Robertson (9)	Milwaukee Arena; 10,938	59–23

1973–74 schedule

== Playoffs ==
1974 playoff game log
Conference Semi-finals: 4–1 (home: 3–0; road: 1–1)

Game	Date	Team	Score	High points	High rebounds	High assists	Location Attendance	Series
1	March 29	Los Angeles	W 99–95	Kareem Abdul-Jabbar (35)	Kareem Abdul-Jabbar (21)	Oscar Robertson (9)	Milwaukee Arena; 10,938	1–0
2	March 31	Los Angeles	W 109–90	Kareem Abdul-Jabbar (32)	Kareem Abdul-Jabbar (25)	Oscar Robertson (9)	Milwaukee Arena; 10,938	2–0
3	April 2	@ Los Angeles	L 96–98	Kareem Abdul-Jabbar (29)	Kareem Abdul-Jabbar (15)	Oscar Robertson (16)	The Forum; 17,505	2–1
4	April 4	@ Los Angeles	W 112–90	Kareem Abdul-Jabbar (31)	Kareem Abdul-Jabbar (16)	Oscar Robertson (9)	The Forum; 17,505	3–1
5	April 7	Los Angeles	W 114–92	Ron Williams (22)	Cornell Warner (17)	Abdul-Jabbar, Robertson (8)	Milwaukee Arena; 10,938	4–1

Conference Finals: 4–0 (home: 2–0; road: 2–0)

Game	Date	Team	Score	High points	High rebounds	High assists	Location Attendance	Series
1	April 16	Chicago	W 101–85	Abdul-Jabbar, Dandridge (25)	Kareem Abdul-Jabbar (19)	Oscar Robertson (10)	Milwaukee Arena; 10,938	1–0
2	April 18	@ Chicago	W 113–111	Kareem Abdul-Jabbar (44)	Kareem Abdul-Jabbar (21)	Oscar Robertson (8)	Chicago Stadium; 17,787	2–0
3	April 20	Chicago	W 113–90	Kareem Abdul-Jabbar (32)	Kareem Abdul-Jabbar (14)	Oscar Robertson (12)	Milwaukee Arena; 10,938	3–0
4	April 22	@ Chicago	W 115–99	Kareem Abdul-Jabbar (38)	Kareem Abdul-Jabbar (24)	Oscar Robertson (10)	Chicago Stadium; 12,762	4–0

NBA Finals: 3–4 (home: 1–3; road: 2–1)

Game	Date	Team	Score	High points	High rebounds	High assists	Location Attendance	Series
1	April 28	Boston	L 83–98	Kareem Abdul-Jabbar (35)	Kareem Abdul-Jabbar (14)	Oscar Robertson (8)	Milwaukee Arena; 10,938	0–1
2	April 30	Boston	W 105–96 (OT)	Kareem Abdul-Jabbar (36)	Kareem Abdul-Jabbar (15)	Oscar Robertson (9)	Milwaukee Arena; 10,938	1–1
3	May 3	@ Boston	L 83–95	Kareem Abdul-Jabbar (26)	Abdul-Jabbar, Warner (10)	Abdul-Jabbar, Robertson (5)	Boston Garden; 15,320	1–2
4	May 5	@ Boston	W 97–89	Kareem Abdul-Jabbar (34)	Kareem Abdul-Jabbar (14)	Oscar Robertson (9)	Boston Garden; 15,320	2–2
5	May 7	Boston	L 87–96	Kareem Abdul-Jabbar (37)	Kareem Abdul-Jabbar (11)	Jon McGlocklin (8)	Milwaukee Arena; 10,938	2–3
6	May 10	@ Boston	W 102–101 (2OT)	Kareem Abdul-Jabbar (34)	four players tied (8)	Oscar Robertson (10)	Boston Garden; 15,320	3–3
7	May 12	Boston	L 87–102	Kareem Abdul-Jabbar (26)	Kareem Abdul-Jabbar (13)	Oscar Robertson (11)	Milwaukee Arena; 10,938	3–4

1974 schedule

== Player statistics ==
Legend
GP	Games played	GS	Games started	MPG	Minutes per game
FG%	Field-goal percentage	3P%	3-point field-goal percentage	FT%	Free-throw percentage
RPG	Rebounds per game	APG	Assists per game	SPG	Steals per game
BPG	Blocks per game	PPG	Points per game

=== Season ===
Player	GP	GS	MPG	FG%	3FG%	FT%	RPG	APG	SPG	BPG	PPG
Kareem Abdul-Jabbar	81		43.8	53.9		70.2	14.5	4.8	1.4	3.5	27.0
Bob Dandridge	71		35.5	50.3		81.8	6.7	2.8	1.6	0.6	18.9
Lucius Allen	72		33.2	49.5		78.8	4.0	5.2	1.9	0.3	17.6
Oscar Robertson	70		35.4	43.8		83.5	4.0	6.4	1.1	0.1	12.7
Jon McGlocklin	79		24.2	47.5		90.0	1.8	3.1	0.5	0.1	9.2
Curtis Perry	81		29.5	44.6		58.2	8.7	2.3	1.3	1.2	9.0
Cornell Warner	67		20.2	51.2		73.6	5.7	1.0	0.4	0.6	6.3
Ron Williams	71		15.9	48.9		88.2	1.0	2.2	0.7	0.0	6.3
Mickey Davis	73		13.9	50.4		83.0	3.1	1.2	0.4	0.1	5.9
Terry Driscoll	64		10.9	47.1		65.2	3.1	0.8	0.3	0.3	3.2
Russ Lee	36		4.6	40.4		68.8	1.1	0.6	0.3	0.0	2.4
Dick Garrett	15		5.8	31.4		83.3	0.9	0.6	0.2	0.0	1.8
Chuck Terry	7		4.6	33.3		0.0	0.4	0.6	0.3	0.0	1.1
Dick Cunningham	8		5.6	50.0		0.0	2.0	0.0	0.3	0.3	0.8

=== Playoffs ===
Player	GP	GS	MPG	FG%	3FG%	FT%	RPG	APG	SPG	BPG	PPG
Kareem Abdul-Jabbar	16		47.4	55.7		73.6	15.8	4.9	1.3	2.4	32.2
Bob Dandridge	16		40.5	49.3		76.6	7.6	2.8	1.4	0.6	19.3
Oscar Robertson	16		43.1	45.0		84.6	3.4	9.3	0.9	0.3	14.0
Ron Williams	15		23.6	46.7		80.0	1.8	3.1	0.6	0.2	8.7
Jon McGlocklin	14		23.8	49.5		72.7	1.1	3.1	0.4	0.1	8.4
Cornell Warner	16		31.6	42.3		68.4	10.2	1.3	0.4	0.9	6.7
Curtis Perry	16		18.5	50.0		58.3	5.1	0.8	0.6	0.1	6.2
Mickey Davis	15		16.3	49.2		91.7	2.3	0.8	0.3	0.1	5.7
Russ Lee	6		2.0	62.5		25.0	0.5	0.2	0.5	0.2	1.8
Terry Driscoll	9		3.2	50.0		100.0	1.6	0.3	0.2	0.1	1.3
Dick Garrett	8		5.8	28.6		50.0	0.4	0.9	0.3	0.0	0.8

== Awards and records ==
- Kareem Abdul-Jabbar, NBA Most Valuable Player Award
- Kareem Abdul-Jabbar, All-NBA First Team
- Kareem Abdul-Jabbar, NBA All-Defensive First Team

== Transactions ==
=== Free agents ===
Player	Signed	Former team
Cornell Warner	November 5, 1973	Cleveland Cavaliers
Dick Garrett	January 8, 1974	New York Knicks
