= 1972–73 Milwaukee Bucks season =

NBA professional basketball team season

- Division champions
- Head coach: Larry Costello
- President: John Steinmiller (vice)
- General manager: Wayne Embry
- Owners: Milwaukee Professional Sports and Services, Inc. (Milwaukee Pro)
- Arena: Milwaukee Arena

Results
- Record: 60–22 (.732)
- Place: Division: 1st (Midwest); Conference: 1st (Western)
- Playoff finish: Conference semifinals (lost to Warriors 2–4)
- Stats at Basketball Reference

The 1972–73 Milwaukee Bucks season was the Bucks' fifth season in the NBA.

== Draft picks ==
Round	Pick	Player	Position	Nationality	College
1	6	Russ Lee	G/F	United States	Marshall
1	12	Julius Erving	SF/SG	United States	Massachusetts Amherst
2	29	Chuck Terry	F	United States	California State-Long Beach
3	46	George Adams	F/G	United States	Gardner-Webb
4	63	Art White		United States	Georgetown
5	79	Ron Harris		United States	Wichita State
7	113	Mickey Davis	F/G	United States	Duquesne
8	129	Charles Kirkland		United States	Cheyney (PA)
9	143	Jim Regenold		United States	Ball State
10	156	Jolly Spight		United States	Santa Clara

== Roster ==
1972–73 Milwaukee Bucks roster
Players

Pos.	No.	Player	Height	Weight	DOB	From
C	33	Kareem Abdul-Jabbar	7 ft 2 in (2.18 m)	225 lb (102 kg)	1947–04–16	UCLA
G	42	Lucius Allen	6 ft 2 in (1.88 m)	175 lb (79 kg)	1947–09–26	UCLA
C	34	Dick Cunningham	6 ft 10 in (2.08 m)	245 lb (111 kg)	1946–07–11	Murray State
F	10	Bob Dandridge	6 ft 6 in (1.98 m)	195 lb (88 kg)	1947–11–15	Norfolk State
G	20	Mickey Davis	6 ft 7 in (2.01 m)	195 lb (88 kg)	1950–06–16	Duquesne
F	7	Terry Driscoll	6 ft 7 in (2.01 m)	215 lb (98 kg)	1947–08–28	Boston College
F	21	Russ Lee	6 ft 5 in (1.96 m)	185 lb (84 kg)	1950–01–27	Marshall
G	14	Jon McGlocklin	6 ft 5 in (1.96 m)	205 lb (93 kg)	1943–06–10	Indiana
F	18	Curtis Perry	6 ft 7 in (2.01 m)	215 lb (98 kg)	1948–09–13	Missouri State
G	1	Oscar Robertson	6 ft 5 in (1.96 m)	205 lb (93 kg)	1938–11–24	Cincinnati
C	54	Dale Schlueter	6 ft 10 in (2.08 m)	225 lb (102 kg)	1945–11–12	Colorado State
F	31	Chuck Terry	6 ft 6 in (1.98 m)	215 lb (98 kg)	1950–09–27	Long Beach State

Coaches
Head coach
- Larry Costello
Assistant(s)
- Hubie Brown

Legend
- (DP) Unsigned draft pick
- (FA) Free agent
- (S) Suspended
- Injured

== Regular season ==
=== Season standings ===
Midwest Division	W	L	PCT	GB	Home	Road	Neutral	Div
y-Milwaukee Bucks	60	22	.732	–	33–5	25–15	2–2	15–5
x-Chicago Bulls	51	31	.622	9	29–12	20–19	2–0	10–10
Detroit Pistons	40	42	.488	20	26–15	13–25	1–2	9–11
Kansas City–Omaha Kings	36	46	.439	24	24–17	12–29	–	6–14

#	Western Conference			
#	Team	W	L	PCT
1	z-Milwaukee Bucks	60	22	.732
2	y-Los Angeles Lakers	60	22	.732
3	x-Chicago Bulls	51	31	.622
4	x-Golden State Warriors	47	35	.573
5	Detroit Pistons	40	42	.488
6	Phoenix Suns	38	44	.463
7	Kansas City–Omaha Kings	36	46	.439
8	Seattle SuperSonics	26	56	.317
9	Portland Trail Blazers	21	61	.256

z – clinched division title
y – clinched division title
x – clinched playoff spot

=== Game log ===
1972–73 game log
Total: 60–22 (home: 33–5; road: 25–15; neutral: 2–2)
October: 8–1 (home: 2–0; road: 6–1)

Game	Date	Team	Score	High points	High rebounds	High assists	Location Attendance	Record
1	October 13, 1972	@ Phoenix	W 117–105				Arizona Veterans Memorial Coliseum	1–0
2	October 14, 1972	@ Golden State	W 117–105				Oakland-Alameda County Coliseum Arena	2–0
3	October 17, 1972	@ Portland	L 108–117				Memorial Coliseum	2–1
4	October 20, 1972	Detroit	W 109–89				Milwaukee Arena	3–1
5	October 21, 1972	@ Buffalo	W 91–63				Buffalo Memorial Auditorium	4–1
6	October 22, 1972	@ Cleveland	W 104–84				Cleveland Arena	5–1
7	October 25, 1972	Buffalo	W 109–92				Milwaukee Arena	6–1
8	October 26, 1972	@ Kansas City–Omaha	W 114–107				Omaha Civic Auditorium	7–1
9	October 28, 1972	@ Philadelphia	W 96–92				The Spectrum	8–1

November: 3–1 (home: 3–1; road: 0–0)

Game	Date	Team	Score	High points	High rebounds	High assists	Location Attendance	Record
10	November 4, 1972	Phoenix	W 104–105				Milwaukee Arena	8–2
11	November 5, 1972	Philadelphia	W 131–113				Milwaukee Arena	9–2
12	November 8, 1972	Seattle	W 116–103				Milwaukee Arena	10–2
13	November 10, 1972	Baltimore	W 120–82				Milwaukee Arena	11–2

December: 0–0 (home: 0–0; road: 0–0)

Game	Date	Team	Score	High points	High rebounds	High assists	Location Attendance	Record

January: 0–0 (home: 0–0; road: 0–0)

Game	Date	Team	Score	High points	High rebounds	High assists	Location Attendance	Record

February: 0–0 (home: 0–0; road: 0–0)

Game	Date	Team	Score	High points	High rebounds	High assists	Location Attendance	Record

March: 0–0 (home: 0–0; road: 0–0)

Game	Date	Team	Score	High points	High rebounds	High assists	Location Attendance	Record

1972–73 schedule

== Playoffs ==
1973 playoff game log
Conference Semi-finals: 2–4 (home: 1–2; road: 1–2)

Game	Date	Team	Score	High points	High rebounds	High assists	Location Attendance	Series
1	March 30	Golden State	W 110–90	Abdul-Jabbar, Robertson (22)	Kareem Abdul-Jabbar (24)	Oscar Robertson (12)	Milwaukee Arena; 10,746	1–0
2	April 1	Golden State	L 92–95	Kareem Abdul-Jabbar (26)	Kareem Abdul-Jabbar (15)	five players tied (3)	Milwaukee Arena; 10,379	1–1
3	April 5	@ Golden State	W 113–93	Oscar Robertson (34)	Kareem Abdul-Jabbar (18)	Oscar Robertson (8)	Oakland–Alameda County Coliseum Arena; 8,493	2–1
4	April 7	@ Golden State	L 97–102	Kareem Abdul-Jabbar (25)	Perry, Abdul-Jabbar (14)	Oscar Robertson (7)	Oakland–Alameda County Coliseum Arena; 8,173	2–2
5	April 10	Golden State	L 97–100	four players tied (19)	Perry, Abdul-Jabbar (12)	Oscar Robertson (11)	University of Wisconsin Field House; 12,204	2–3
6	April 13	@ Golden State	L 86–100	Kareem Abdul-Jabbar (27)	Kareem Abdul-Jabbar (14)	Lucius Allen (5)	Oakland–Alameda County Coliseum Arena; 13,175	2–4

1973 schedule

== Player statistics ==
Legend
GP	Games played	GS	Games started	MPG	Minutes per game
FG%	Field-goal percentage	3P%	3-point field-goal percentage	FT%	Free-throw percentage
RPG	Rebounds per game	APG	Assists per game	SPG	Steals per game
BPG	Blocks per game	PPG	Points per game

=== Season ===
Player	GP	MPG	FG%	FT%	RPG	APG	PPG
Kareem Abdul-Jabbar	76	42.8	55.4	71.3	16.1	5.0	30.2
Bob Dandridge	73	39.1	47.2	78.9	8.2	2.8	20.2
Oscar Robertson	73	37.5	45.4	84.7	4.9	7.5	15.5
Lucius Allen	80	33.7	48.4	71.5	3.5	5.3	15.5
Jon McGlocklin	80	24.4	50.2	86.3	2.0	3.0	9.6
Curtis Perry	67	31.3	46.1	65.9	9.6	1.8	9.1
Terry Driscoll	59	16.3	42.9	69.4	5.0	0.9	5.5
Mickey Davis	74	14.1	43.8	82.6	3.1	1.0	5.1
Wali Jones	27	15.5	40.7	88.9	1.1	2.1	5.0
Gary Gregor	9	9.8	33.3	71.4	3.6	1.0	3.0
Russ Lee	46	6.0	38.6	74.4	0.9	0.8	2.8
Dick Cunningham	72	9.6	41.0	58.0	2.9	0.5	2.2
Chuck Terry	67	10.3	34.0	70.8	2.2	0.6	1.9

=== Playoffs ===
Player	GP	MPG	FG%	FT%	RPG	APG	PPG
Kareem Abdul-Jabbar	6	46.0	42.8	54.3	16.2	2.8	22.8
Oscar Robertson	6	42.7	50.0	91.2	4.7	7.5	21.2
Lucius Allen	6	33.8	40.4	78.6	2.7	3.5	15.7
Bob Dandridge	6	34.0	42.1	70.4	4.7	1.2	13.8
Jon McGlocklin	6	24.2	50.9	87.5	1.2	2.2	10.2
Curtis Perry	6	39.7	48.1	50.0	11.5	2.2	8.8
Russ Lee	5	2.6	57.1	0.0	0.8	0.4	3.2
Mickey Davis	6	9.0	35.3	100.0	2.0	0.8	2.3
Chuck Terry	5	3.6	80.0	0.0	0.6	0.2	1.6
Dick Cunningham	5	3.4	100.0	0.0	0.6	0.4	0.4
Terry Driscoll	6	2.7	0.0	0.0	0.0	0.2	0.0

== Transactions ==
=== Free agents ===
Player	Signed	Former team
Terry Driscoll	November 15, 1972	Baltimore Bullets

== Awards and records ==
- Kareem Abdul-Jabbar, All-NBA First Team
