= Terry Driscoll =

American basketball player and college athletics administrator (born 1947)

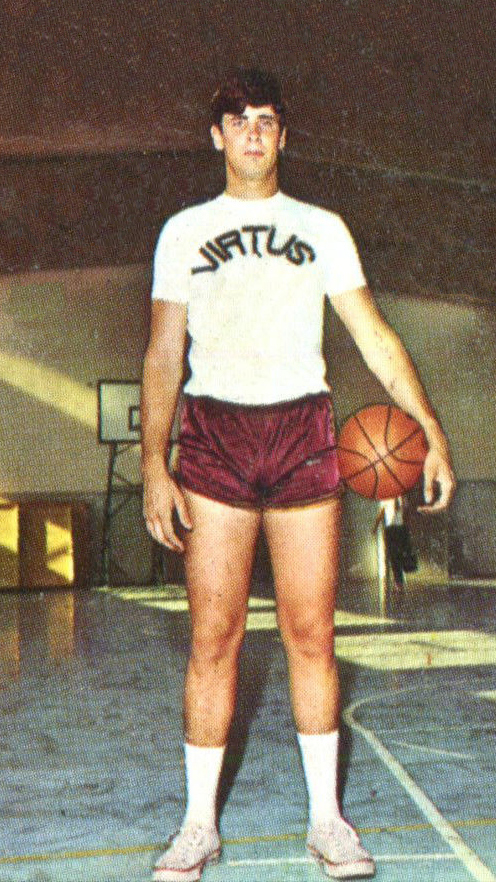
- Terry Driscoll c. 1968

Personal information
- Born: August 28, 1947 (age 79) Winthrop, Massachusetts, U.S.
- Listed height: 6 ft 7 in (2.01 m)
- Listed weight: 215 lb (98 kg)

Career information
- High school: Boston College HS (Boston, Massachusetts)
- College: Boston College (1966–1969)
- NBA draft: 1969: 1st round, 4th overall pick
- Drafted by: Detroit Pistons
- Playing career: 1970–1978
- Position: Small forward
- Number: 17, 35, 7

Career history

Playing
- 1969–1970: Virtus Bologna
- 1970–1971: Detroit Pistons
- 1971–1972: Baltimore Bullets
- 1972–1974: Milwaukee Bucks
- 1974–1975: Spirits of St. Louis
- 1975–1978: Virtus Bologna

Coaching
- 1978–1980: Virtus Bologna

Career highlights
- As player: Italian League champion (1976); Third-team All-American – NABC (1969); As coach: 2× Italian League champion (1979, 1980)

Career NBA and ABA statistics
- Points: 1,127 (4.1 ppg)
- Rebounds: 1,114 (4.1 rpg)
- Assists: 221 (0.8 apg)
- Stats at NBA.com
- Stats at Basketball Reference

Edward Cuthbert "Terry" Driscoll Jr. (born August 28, 1947) is a former American college athletics administrator and professional basketball player. Until 2017, he served as athletic director at the College of William & Mary.

== College career ==
Driscoll played at Boston College from 1966 to 1969. He was named Most Valuable Player of the 1969 National Invitational Tournament after leading his school to the tournament final against Temple University.

== Professional career ==
After graduating, he was selected by the Detroit Pistons with the fourth pick of the 1969 NBA draft. He played a season in the Italian Serie A with Virtus Bologna before joining the Pistons for the 1970–71 NBA season.

After one season with Detroit, he moved to the Baltimore Bullets in 1971, also staying a season. He then had two seasons with the Milwaukee Bucks and one with the ABA's Spirits of St. Louis, averaging 4.1 points per game and 4.1 rebounds per game over the course of his American professional career.

He spent the next five years in Italy as a player and then a coach, winning two Italian championships.

== Career statistics ==
Legend
GP	Games played	GS	Games started	MPG	Minutes per game
FG%	Field goal percentage	3P%	3-point field goal percentage	FT%	Free throw percentage
RPG	Rebounds per game	APG	Assists per game	SPG	Steals per game
BPG	Blocks per game	PPG	Points per game	**Bold**	Career high

=== Regular season ===
Year	Team	GP	GS	MPG	FG%	3P%	FT%	RPG	APG	SPG	BPG	PPG
1970–71	Detroit	**69**	-	**18.2**	.415	-	**.701**	**5.8**	0.8	-	-	5.4
1971–72	Baltimore	40	-	7.8	.385	-	.692	2.7	0.6	-	-	2.7
1972–73	Baltimore	1	-	5.0	.000	-	.000	3.0	0.0	-	-	0.0
1972–73	Milwaukee	59	-	16.3	.429	-	.694	5.0	**0.9**	-	-	**5.5**
1973–74	Milwaukee	64	-	10.9	**.471**	-	.652	3.1	0.8	**0.3**	**0.3**	3.2
1974-75	Milwaukee	11	-	4.7	.231	-	.500	1.5	0.3	0.1	0.0	0.6
Career		244	-	13.4	.425	-	.690	4.2	0.8	0.3	0.2	4.2

=== Playoffs ===
Year	Team	GP	GS	MPG	FG%	3P%	FT%	RPG	APG	SPG	BPG	PPG
1971–72	Baltimore	1	-	2.0	**1.000**	-	**1.000**	1.0	0.0	-	-	**3.0**
1972–73	Milwaukee	6	-	2.7	.000	-	.000	0.0	0.2	-	-	0.0
1973–74	Milwaukee	**9**	-	**3.2**	.500	-	**1.000**	**1.6**	**0.3**	**0.2**	**0.1**	1.3
Career		16	-	2.9	.400	-	1.000	0.9	0.3	0.2	0.1	0.9

=== Regular season ===
Year	Team	GP	GS	MPG	FG%	3P%	FT%	RPG	APG	SPG	BPG	PPG
1974–75	St. Louis	**30**	-	11.7	.377	.000	.741	2.9	1.1	0.3	0.2	3.7

== Post-playing career ==
After leaving professional basketball, Driscoll worked in product marketing and sales for different sporting goods companies before moving to sports marketing and management. He worked as the Boston site venue executive director during the 1994 FIFA World Cup. Driscoll became the athletic director at William & Mary in 1995, succeeding John Randolph who had served ten years until he died from cancer. He held the position until his retirement on June 30, 2017. He was succeeded by Samantha Huge.
