= Cornell Warner =

American basketball player (born 1948)

Personal information
- Born: August 12, 1948 (age 78) Jackson, Mississippi, U.S.
- Listed height: 6 ft 9 in (2.06 m)
- Listed weight: 220 lb (100 kg)

Career information
- High school: Lanier (Jackson, Mississippi)
- College: Jackson State (1967–1970)
- NBA draft: 1970: 2nd round, 24th overall pick
- Drafted by: Buffalo Braves
- Playing career: 1970–1977
- Position: Power forward / center
- Number: 35, 15, 30, 20

Career history
- 1970–1972: Buffalo Braves
- 1972–1973: Cleveland Cavaliers
- 1973–1975: Milwaukee Bucks
- 1975–1977: Los Angeles Lakers
- 1977–1979: Fribourg Olympic Basket
- 1979: Crispa Redmanizers

Career highlights
- SBL championship (1978, 1979); SWAC Player of the Year (1970); 2× First-team All-SWAC (1969, 1970); Second-team All-SWAC (1968)

Career NBA statistics
- Points: 2,860 (6.4 ppg)
- Rebounds: 3,353 (7.5 rpg)
- Assists: 494 (1.1 apg)
- Stats at NBA.com
- Stats at Basketball Reference

Cornell Warner (born August 12, 1948) is an American former professional basketball player.

A 6'9" forward/center from Jackson State University, Warner played seven seasons (1970–1977) in the National Basketball Association as a member of the Buffalo Braves, Cleveland Cavaliers, Milwaukee Bucks, and Los Angeles Lakers. He averaged 6.4 points per game and 7.5 rebounds per game in his NBA career. Warner's statistically strongest season was 1974–75, during which he averaged 7.6 points and 10.3 rebounds for the Bucks.

In October 1977, he signed with Fribourg Olympic Basket of Switzerland. Warner played until 1979 for the club, winning the Swiss national championship in 1978 and 1979.

== NBA career statistics ==
Legend
| GP | Games played | GS | Games started | MPG | Minutes per game |
| FG% | Field goal percentage | 3P% | 3-point field goal percentage | FT% | Free throw percentage |
| RPG | Rebounds per game | APG | Assists per game | SPG | Steals per game |
| BPG | Blocks per game | PPG | Points per game | **Bold** | Career high |

=== Regular season ===
| Year | Team | GP | GS | MPG | FG% | 3P% | FT% | RPG | APG | SPG | BPG | PPG |
|---|---|---|---|---|---|---|---|---|---|---|---|---|
| 1970–71 | Buffalo | 65 | – | 19.9 | .415 | – | .552 | 7.0 | 0.8 | – | – | 6.0 |
| 1971–72 | Buffalo | 62 | – | 20.0 | .443 | – | .744 | 6.1 | 0.9 | – | – | 6.2 |
| 1972–73 | Buffalo | 4 | – | 11.8 | .471 | – | .500 | 3.8 | 1.5 | – | – | 4.3 |
| 1972–73 | Cleveland | 68 | – | 19.5 | .411 | – | .659 | 7.5 | 1.0 | – | – | 5.7 |
| 1973–74 | Cleveland | 5 | – | 9.8 | .154 | – | **1.000** | 3.4 | 0.8 | 0.0 | 0.4 | 1.6 |
| 1973–74 | Milwaukee | 67 | – | 20.2 | **.512** | – | .736 | 5.7 | 1.0 | 0.4 | 0.6 | 6.3 |
| 1974–75 | Milwaukee | 79 | – | **31.9** | .458 | – | .684 | **10.3** | **1.6** | 0.6 | **0.7** | **7.6** |
| 1975–76 | Los Angeles | **81** | – | 31.0 | .479 | – | .695 | 8.9 | 1.3 | **0.7** | 0.6 | 7.3 |
| 1976–77 | Los Angeles | 14 | – | 12.1 | .472 | – | .667 | 4.9 | 0.8 | 0.1 | 0.1 | 3.9 |
| Career | | 445 | – | 23.6 | .452 | – | .672 | 7.5 | 1.1 | 0.5 | 0.6 | 6.4 |

=== Playoffs ===
| Year | Team | GP | GS | MPG | FG% | 3P% | FT% | RPG | APG | SPG | BPG | PPG |
|---|---|---|---|---|---|---|---|---|---|---|---|---|
| 1973–74 | Milwaukee | **16** | – | **31.6** | .423 | – | **.684** | **10.2** | **1.3** | **0.4** | **0.9** | **6.7** |
| 1976–77 | Los Angeles | 5 | – | 11.2 | **.583** | – | .000 | 1.8 | 1.2 | 0.2 | 0.0 | 2.8 |
| Career | | 21 | – | 26.7 | .439 | – | .684 | 8.2 | 1.2 | 0.4 | 0.7 | 5.8 |
