= Lucius Allen =

American basketball player (born 1947)

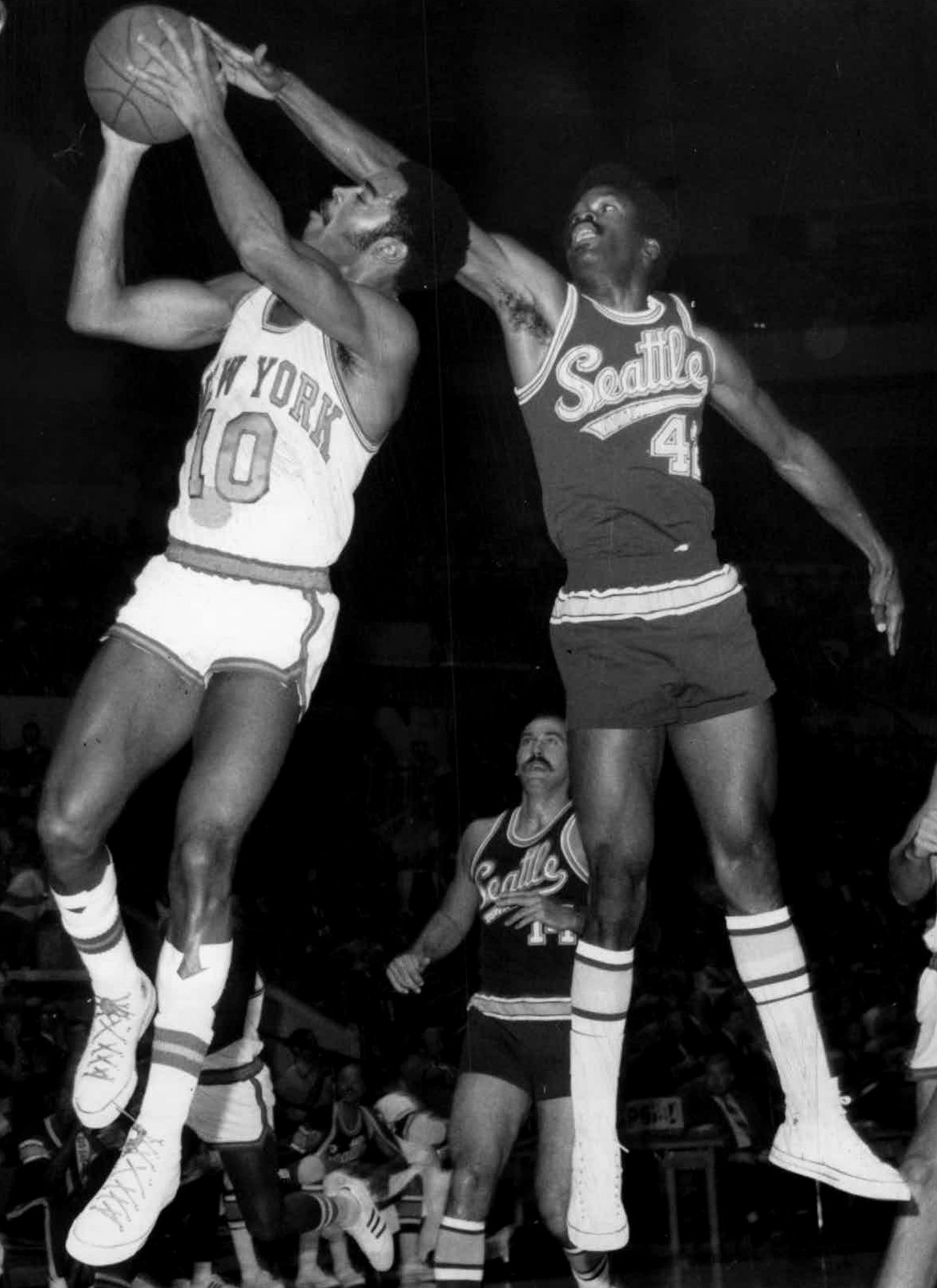
- Allen (right) defending Walt Frazier of New York in 1969

Personal information
- Born: September 26, 1947 (age 79) Kansas City, Kansas, U.S.
- Listed height: 6 ft 2 in (1.88 m)
- Listed weight: 175 lb (79 kg)

Career information
- High school: Wyandotte (Kansas City, Kansas)
- College: UCLA (1966–1968)
- NBA draft: 1969: 1st round, 3rd overall pick
- Drafted by: Seattle SuperSonics
- Playing career: 1969–1979
- Position: Point guard
- Number: 42, 7, 40

Career history
- 1969–1970: Seattle SuperSonics
- 1970–1974: Milwaukee Bucks
- 1974–1977: Los Angeles Lakers
- 1977–1979: Kansas City Kings

Career highlights
- NBA champion (1971); 2× NCAA champion (1967, 1968); Consensus second-team All-American (1968); First-team All-AAWU (1967); Second-team All-AAWU (1968); Second-team Parade All-American (1965)

Career NBA statistics
- Points: 9,407 (13.4 ppg)
- Rebounds: 2,205 (3.1 rpg)
- Assists: 3,174 (4.5 apg)
- Stats at NBA.com
- Stats at Basketball Reference

Lucius Oliver Allen Jr. (born September 26, 1947) is an American former professional basketball player. He is one of only a select few players to have won at least one high school state championship, collegiate national championship, and NBA championship.

== Early life ==
Allen was born on September 26, 1947, in Kansas City, Kansas, where he was raised in a family of nine children. As a young teenager, Allen developed his basketball skills under nationally known softball player Norma Jean McDaniel at the Kensington Community Center in Kansas City. He attended Wyandotte High School (1962–65), graduating in 1965.

Over his three years on the school's basketball team, he averaged 22 points and 14 rebounds per game, and set the school record for most points in a game. His team went to the Kansas state Class AA high school championship game all three years he was on the team. The 6 ft 2 in (1.88 m) Allen played forward under head coach Walter Shublom, who had a 296–26 record over 15 years as Wyandotte's head coach, winning 10 state championships. Allen's Wyandotte teams were 22–1 (sophomore), 21–2 (junior) and an undefeated 23–0 in his senior season.

As a sophomore, the team went to the state championship game, where Allen was named a starter for the first time that season (though the team lost that game). As a junior and senior, he led Wyandotte to back-to-back Class AA state championships in 1964 and 1965. In 1965, he was a prep (high school) All-American player, being named a Parade Magazine second-team All-American. In both 1964 and 1965, Allen was named consensus first-team Class AA All-State, was selected to the Class AA All-Tournament teams, and was the tournament's Most Valuable Player both years.

Allen was also the first baseman for Wyandotte's 1964 Class AA-A state champion baseball team.

== College career ==
In 1965, Allen was recruited to the University of California at Los Angeles (UCLA) by legendary coach John Wooden, who won ten national NCAA men's Division I championships at UCLA. He was recruited by over 70 other schools, but chose UCLA. Allen was part of the same class as Lew Alcindor (later known as Kareem Abdul-Jabbar). Wooden had first seen Allen play in 1964 at a Fellowship of Christian Athletes summer basketball camp, where Wooden and Shublom were instructors.

During his freshman year (1965–66), Allen, now at guard, played on the freshman team with Abdul-Jabbar. Allen scored the very first points ever scored in Pauley Pavilion history during the annual freshman vs varsity game. In that game, the freshmen defeated the varsity 75–60, as the varsity (which had been 58–2 over the last two seasons and won NCAA national championships in 1964 and 1965) could not handle Abdul-Jabbar. Allen was the second best freshman player, with 16 points and eight rebounds, while hounding sophomore guard Mike Warren defensively.

During his freshman season, the UCLA freshman team finished the season undefeated (21–0), and Allen averaged 22.4 points and 7.8 rebounds per game. Abdul-Jabbar, then known as Lew Alcindor, was Allen's freshman roommate. The 1965-66 varsity team had an 18–8 record and did not play in the 1966 NCAA tournament.

During his sophomore year (1966–67), Allen started at guard on a varsity team using a three-guard lineup, alongside fellow sophomores Abdul Jabbar, Lynn Shackelford (forward), Kenny Heitz (guard), and junior guard Mike Warren. He averaged 15.5 points per game, second only to Abdul-Jabbar's 29 points per game for the Bruins. He also averaged 5.8 rebounds per game, third best on the team. The Bruins achieved an undefeated 30–0 season, winning the 1967 National Championship.

Over four games during the 1967 NCAA tournament, Allen had 64 points and 29 rebounds. In UCLA's championship game win over the University of Dayton, 79–64, he scored 19 points and had 9 rebounds (second on the Bruins to Abdul-Jabbar's 20 points and 18 rebounds). Allen was named to the NCAA Championship and West Region All-Tournament Teams. He was also named first-team All-Athletic Association of Western Universities (now PAC 12) for the 1966–67 season, as well as United Press International's (UPI) first-team All-West Coast College team. He was an honorable mention Associated Press (AP) All-American.

During his junior year, Allen averaged 15.1 points per game (again second to Abdul-Jabbar) and six rebounds per game (again third on the team), helping the 29–1 Bruins win a second consecutive NCAA Championship. UCLA's only loss came on January 20, 1968, against future Naismith Basketball Hall of Fame center and consensus 1967-68 NCAA player of the year Elvin Hayes and the Houston Cougars, 71–69. The loss broke UCLA's 47-game winning streak. The highly anticipated game was played in the Houston Astrodome, with over 52,000 people in attendance. It was also the first nationally syndicated college basketball game for television, billed as the “Game of the Century”. Abdul-Jabbar had suffered an eye injury just eight days earlier and scored only 15 points in a sluggish performance, during a year in which he otherwise averaged over 26 points per game. Allen was high scorer for the Bruins with 25 points, and Hayes had 39.

UCLA played No. 1 ranked Houston two months later in the 1968 NCAA national semifinals (the final four), winning 101–69. Allen just missed a triple-double against Houston, with 19 points (tied for game-high), a game-high 12 assists, and nine rebounds. UCLA then won the championship game against the University of North Carolina, 78–55, with Abdul-Jabbar scoring 34 and Allen having 11 points, five rebounds and five assists. Allen was named to the NCAA All-Tournament Team, the West Region All-Tournament Team, and was selected as a consensus 1967-68 second-team All-American.

Two months after the 1967–68 season had ended, Allen was arrested for marijuana possession. He pleaded guilty to the charge in October 1968, and received a $300 fine, a 60-day suspended sentence and one year of probation. Allen had left UCLA without playing his senior year and was going to join the National Guard, but this did not work out.

Allen made clear he did not leave school because of the legal incident, but because his mother was suffering from cancer and needed surgery and he had to leave school to earn money to help out in that difficult situation. Los Angeles businessman and UCLA team booster Sam Gilbert (the subject of later controversy in both), communicated on Allen's behalf with Seattle SuperSonics' owner Sam Schulman. No longer in school, Allen was a free agent, and Schulman signed Allen to a personal services contract with the SuperSonics in 1968; alleviating the financial pressures on Allen. Allen did play some AAU basketball after leaving UCLA.

== Professional career ==
Allen entered the 1969 NBA draft when he became eligible in 1969 after what would have been his senior college year. Seattle selected Allen with the 3rd overall pick in the first round (after Abdul-Jabbar and center Neal Walk). In 1970, Schulman joined with Spencer Haywood to bring an antitrust lawsuit against the NBA that would successfully upend the rule limiting NBA draft eligibility to college seniors.

=== Seattle SuperSonics ===
As a rookie with the SuperSonics, Allen played under player-coach Lenny Wilkens. He was also the reserve point guard behind Wilkens, who was the team's starting point guard. Wilkens was only the second black NBA head coach, and Allen considered this a unique and valuable opportunity for him at the time to play for Wilkens. Wilkens has been inducted into the Naismith Hall of Fame as both a player (1989) and coach (1998). Allen averaged 9.8 points, 4.2 assists and 2.6 rebounds in 22.4 minutes per game that season.

=== Milwaukee Bucks ===
On September 17, 1970, the SuperSonics traded Allen and Bob Boozer to the Milwaukee Bucks for Don Smith (later known as Zaid Abdul-Aziz). Seattle general manager Bob Houbregs regretted losing Allen, who he believed would become a star player, but believed Abdul-Aziz filled a positional need that would advance the SuperSonics as a team in the future. In going to Milwaukee, Allen would be joining his old UCLA roommate and teammate, Abdul-Jabbar (who had been the Bucks 1969 first round draft pick, and first overall pick in that draft).

In April 1970, the Bucks had traded for future Hall of Fame point guard Oscar Robertson, one of the NBA's greatest players of all time. During the 1970–71 season, Allen served as Robertson's backup at point guard, under coach Larry Costello. He played in 61 games, and averaged 7.1 points and 2.6 assists in 19 minutes per game. The 1970-71 Bucks had a 66–16 record, including winning streaks of 16 and 20 games (the later a then NBA record). The Bucks won the NBA Championship in the post-season with a 4–0 sweep of the Baltimore Bullets; after earlier defeating the San Francisco Warriors and Los Angeles Lakers four games to one in each of their earlier playoff series.

During the five-game playoff series against the Warriors, Allen averaged 8.8 points, 5.8 assists and three rebounds in 25.2 minutes per game. In the final game against the Warriors, he had 13 points, seven assists and five rebounds in only 23 minutes. He averaged 5.6 points, 3.2 assists and 2.8 rebounds in the Lakers' series, playing less than 20 minutes per game. In 22 minutes per game in the four-game sweep of the Bullets, he averaged 7.5 points, 1.8 assists and 2.8 rebounds.

The Bucks won the NBA's Midwest Division in 1971–72, with a 63–19 record. Allen's playing time increased to 29 minutes per game, averaging 13.5 points, 4.2 assists and 3.2 rebounds per game. The Bucks won their first-round playoff series over the Golden State Warriors in five games, with Allen starting and playing nearly 36 minutes per game, averaging 19 points, 5.2 assists and 4.2 rebounds per game. They lost in the Western Conference finals to Wilt Chamberlain and the eventual NBA champion Los Angeles Lakers. Allen played nearly 35 minutes a game, averaging 17 points and nearly three rebounds and three assists per game.

In 1972–73, the Bucks won the Midwest Division with a 60–22 record. Allen played nearly 34 minutes per game, averaging 15.5 points, 5.3 assists and 3.5 rebound per game. He was 19th in voting for NBA Most Valuable Player. He averaged nearly 34 minutes and 16 points per game in the Bucks first round playoff loss to the Warriors.

The Bucks won 59 games the following season (1973–74), and reached the 1974 NBA Finals. Allen averaged a then career-high 17.6 points per game, to go along with 5.2 assists, four rebounds and 1.9 steals per game. He was 15th in NBA Most Valuable Player voting.

Allen, however, was injured and did not play in the 1974 playoffs. Shortly before the playoffs started, in a mid-March game against the Detroit Pistons, he slipped on a misplaced warmup jacket as he was chasing a loose ball, and suffered knee damage.

The Bucks won the first two rounds of the playoffs (four games to one over the Lakers and four games to none over the Chicago Bulls), even without Allen. But Allen's absence put the Bucks at a disadvantage against the Boston Celtics in the NBA finals. Without the speedy Allen, the Celtics strategy in the championship Game 7 was to focus on pressuring the 35-year old Robertson, and trusting future Hall of fame center Dave Cowens to adequately defend Abdul-Jabbar by himself. The Celtics won 102–87 to take the championship. Abdul-Jabbar believed the Bucks would have won the series but for the loss of Allen, and Robertson not being at full strength.

This was Allen's last full season in Milwaukee, during which he arguably played his greatest professional game, a 39-point and 6 assist effort during a loss against the Detroit Pistons on January 2. Robertson retired in September 1974, before the start of the 1974–75 season, leaving Allen to take over full-time at point guard. However, in early November 1974 after playing only 10 games for the Bucks that season, Allen was surprisingly traded to the Los Angeles Lakers for younger point guard Jim Price. Price had been selected second-team All-NBA defensive team the prior season, when he also averaged 15.4 points, 4.5 assists and 4.6 rebounds per game. The Bucks finished the season 38–44 and failed to make the playoffs, though Price made the All-Star team averaging 16.1 points and 5.7 assists on the season.

=== Los Angeles Lakers ===
In 56 games with the 1974-75 Lakers, Allen averaged 19.5 points, 5.7 assists, 4.4 rebounds and 2.2 steals. His overall season total 2.1 steals per game was 8th best in the NBA. The Lakers, however, finished the year 30–52. Abdul-Jabbar demanded a trade after the 1974–75 season ended. In June 1975, Abdul-Jabbar and Walt Wesley were traded to the Lakers for Elmore Smith, Dave Meyers, Brian Winters, and Junior Bridgeman; Abdul-Jabbar now joining Allen for a third time.

The 1975-76 Lakers improved to 40–42, with Abdul-Jabbar named the NBA's Most Valuable Player. The team also included future Hall of Fame shooting guard Gail Goodrich, also a UCLA alumni. Allen played almost 32 minutes per game as starting point guard, averaging 14.7 points, 4.7 assists, 2.8 rebounds and 1.3 steals per game. Still, the team did not make the playoffs.

Under head coach Jerry West, the Lakers finished first in the Pacific Division the following season (1976–77), with a 53–29 record. Abdul-Jabbar was again the NBA's Most Valuable Player. Allen continued as starting point guard, averaging 14.6 points, 5.2 assists, 3.2 rebounds and 1.5 steals in a little less than 32 minutes per game.

The Lakers won a seven-game series over the Warriors in the first round of the playoffs, but Allen had suffered a foot injury that limited his play during that series. The Lakers lost in four consecutive games to the eventual NBA Champion Portland Trail Blazers in the Western Conference finals; after having won three of four games over the Trail Blazers during the regular season. Allen was only able to play in two games because of injury, but in those games managed to play 35.5 minutes per game, while averaging 17 points, six assists, five rebounds and 1.5 steals.

=== Kansas City Kings ===
In June 1977, Allen was traded to the Kansas City Kings for Ollie Johnson, a 1978 1st round draft pick (Purvis Short) and a 1978 2nd round draft pick (Ron Carter). Allen had played out his option with the Lakers, and expressed a desire to be traded to his home town.

Allen averaged nearly 28 minutes per game as the Kings starting point guard during the 1977–78 season. He averaged 11.9 points, 4.7 assists, three rebounds and 1.2 steals a game for the 31–52 Kings. His play was affected by the lingering toe injury from his Lakers' days, and various ailments during the season.

Allen had toe surgery after the season, and was still impaired when training camp started in September 1979. He was then sidelined with a stress fracture in his lower leg that kept him out for some time during the season, playing only 11 minutes in the pre-season before being hobbled. The Kings finished the 1978–79 season with a 48–34 record, first in the Midwest Division. Phil Ford started at point guard, and Allen played in only 31 games that year as a back-up point guard. Allen tried to make the team for the 1979–80 season, but was waived in mid-October 1979, ending his NBA career.

=== Career ===
Allen played 702 regular season games in 10 years in the NBA for four teams, averaging nearly 29 minutes per game. He averaged 13.4 points, 4.5 assists and 3.1 rebounds per game, and 1.5 steals per game from the 1973–74 season until the end of his career. His highest scoring average was 19.1 points per game, during the 1974–75 season.

== Later life ==
After finishing his basketball career, which included a high school state championship, college national championship, and an NBA championship, Allen turned his attention to coaching aspiring players in the Los Angeles area.

== Legacy and awards ==
In 1999, The Topeka Capital-Journal named Allen as the greatest Kansas high school basketball player of the 20th century. New Arena named Allen as the best basketball player of all-time from the State of Kansas. Allen was inducted into the UCLA Hall of Fame in 2000. He was inducted into the Pac-12 Conference men's basketball Hall of Honor on March 16, 2013. He was inducted into the Kansas Sports Hall of Fame in 2004.

Allen is among a small group of players to win state high school, NCAA and NBA championships. The group includes, among others, Abdul-Jabbar, Allen's former Lakers teammate (and UCLA alumni) Gail Goodrich, and Hall of famers Bill Russell, Magic Johnson, Cliff Hagan, Bill Walton, Tom Gola and Jerry Lucas.

== Career statistics ==
Legend
GP	Games played	GS	Games started	MPG	Minutes per game
FG%	Field goal percentage	3P%	3-point field goal percentage	FT%	Free throw percentage
RPG	Rebounds per game	APG	Assists per game	SPG	Steals per game
BPG	Blocks per game	PPG	Points per game	**Bold**	Career high

=== NBA ===
==== Regular season ====
Year	Team	GP	MPG	FG%	FT%	RPG	APG	SPG	BPG	PPG
1969–70	Seattle	**81**	22.4	.442	.731	2.6	4.2	—	—	9.8
1970–71†	Milwaukee	61	19.0	.447	.700	2.5	2.6	—	—	7.1
1971–72	Milwaukee	80	29.0	**.505**	.764	3.2	4.2	—	—	13.5
1972–73	Milwaukee	80	33.7	.484	.715	3.5	5.3	—	—	15.5
1973–74	Milwaukee	72	33.2	.495	.788	4.0	5.2	1.9	0.3	17.6
1974–75	Milwaukee	10	34.2	.415	**.838**	3.1	5.3	1.4	0.1	16.7
1974–75	L.A. Lakers	56	**35.9**	.440	.770	**4.4**	**5.7**	**2.2**	**0.5**	**19.5**
1975–76	L.A. Lakers	76	31.4	.459	.776	2.8	4.7	1.3	0.3	14.7
1976–77	L.A. Lakers	78	31.8	.456	.774	3.2	5.2	1.5	0.2	14.6
1977–78	Kansas City	77	27.9	.441	.791	3.0	4.7	1.2	0.4	11.9
1978–79	Kansas City	31	13.3	.397	.576	1.5	1.4	0.7	0.2	5.1
Career		702	28.7	.463	.760	3.1	4.5	1.5	0.3	13.4

==== Playoffs ====
Year	Team	GP	MPG	FG%	FT%	RPG	APG	SPG	BPG	PPG
1971†	Milwaukee	**14**	22.3	**.506**	.714	2.9	3.7	—	—	7.3
1972	Milwaukee	11	**35.1**	.470	.759	3.5	**3.8**	—	—	**17.9**
1973	Milwaukee	6	33.8	.404	.786	2.7	3.5	—	—	15.7
1977	L.A. Lakers	7	26.6	.390	.684	**4.6**	3.4	**1.6**	**0.4**	11.0
1979	Kansas City	5	14.6	.469	**1.000**	1.4	0.6	0.4	0.2	7.2
Playoffs		43	27.0	.449	.756	3.1	3.3	1.1	0.3	11.8
