= Russ Lee =

American basketball player (born 1950)

Personal information
- Born: January 27, 1950 (age 76) Boston, Massachusetts, U.S.
- Listed height: 6 ft 5 in (1.96 m)
- Listed weight: 185 lb (84 kg)

Career information
- High school: Hyde Park (Boston, Massachusetts)
- College: Marshall (1969–1972)
- NBA draft: 1972: 1st round, 6th overall pick
- Drafted by: Milwaukee Bucks
- Playing career: 1972–1974
- Position: Shooting guard / small forward
- Number: 21, 11

Career history
- 1972–1974: Milwaukee Bucks
- 1974: New Orleans Jazz

Career highlights
- No. 55 retired by Marshall Thundering Herd
- Stats at NBA.com
- Stats at Basketball Reference

Russell E. Lee (born January 27, 1950) is an American former professional basketball player in the National Basketball Association (NBA). He was selected as the sixth overall pick in the 1972 NBA draft by the Milwaukee Bucks. He played college basketball for the Marshall Thundering Herd.

== College career ==
Lee played four seasons with the Marshall University Thundering Herd, with whom he averaged 23.9 points and 11.3 rebounds per game. In 1985, he was inducted into the Marshall Hall of Fame, and in 2003 he had his number retired.

== Professional career ==
Lee was drafted sixth overall in the 1972 NBA draft by the Milwaukee Bucks, with whom he played two seasons averaging 2.6 points per game coming off the bench. His best season for the Bucks was his rookie season, when he averaged 2.8 points per game.

Before the start of the 1974–1975 NBA season, Lee was traded to the New Orleans Jazz with a 1975 NBA draft first-round pick for Steve Kuberski and a second round pick in 1975. Lee would play only 15 games for the Jazz, averaging 4.3 points and 2.1 rebounds per game before being cut and opting to retire.

== NBA career statistics ==
Legend
GP	Games played	GS	Games started	MPG	Minutes per game
FG%	Field goal percentage	3P%	3-point field goal percentage	FT%	Free throw percentage
RPG	Rebounds per game	APG	Assists per game	SPG	Steals per game
BPG	Blocks per game	PPG	Points per game	**Bold**	Career high

=== Regular season ===
Year	Team	GP	MPG	FG%	FT%	RPG	APG	SPG	BPG	PPG
1972–73	Milwaukee	**46**	6.0	.386	**.744**	.9	**.8**	–	–	2.8
1973–74	Milwaukee	36	4.6	**.404**	.688	1.1	.6	.3	.0	2.4
1974–75	New Orleans	15	**9.3**	.382	.500	**2.1**	.5	**.7**	**.2**	**4.3**
Career		97	6.0	.391	.685	1.2	.7	.4	.1	2.9

=== Playoffs ===
Year	Team	GP	MPG	FG%	FT%	RPG	APG	SPG	BPG	PPG
1973	Milwaukee	5	**2.6**	.571	–	**.8**	**.4**	–	–	**3.2**
1974	Milwaukee	**6**	2.0	**.625**	**.250**	.5	.2	**.5**	**.2**	1.8
Career		11	2.3	.591	.250	.6	.3	.5	.2	2.5

== Personal life ==
Lee is the older brother of Ron Lee, former All-American basketball player at the University of Oregon and 1978 NBA steals leader. Lee has a brother who played basketball at Marshall as well named, Eugene.
