= Curtis Perry =

American basketball player (born 1948)

Personal information
- Born: September 13, 1948 (age 78) Washington, D.C., U.S.
- Listed height: 6 ft 7 in (2.01 m)
- Listed weight: 220 lb (100 kg)

Career information
- High school: Western (Washington, D.C.)
- College: Missouri State (1966–1970)
- NBA draft: 1970: 3rd round, 35th overall pick
- Drafted by: San Diego Rockets
- Playing career: 1970–1978
- Position: Power forward
- Number: 54, 18

Career history
- 1970–1971: San Diego / Houston Rockets
- 1971: →Northwest Travelers
- 1971–1974: Milwaukee Bucks
- 1974–1978: Phoenix Suns

Career highlights
- No. 54 retired by Missouri State Bears

Career NBA statistics
- Points: 4,578 (9.5 ppg)
- Rebounds: 4,239 (8.8 rpg)
- Assists: 906 (1.9 apg)
- Stats at NBA.com
- Stats at Basketball Reference

Curtis R. Perry (born September 13, 1948) is an American former professional basketball player. Born in Washington, D.C., he attended Southwest Missouri State University (now known as Missouri State) and played at forward.

At Missouri State, Perry helped the team to a school record 28 consecutive wins.

Perry was selected by the San Diego Rockets in the third round of the 1970 NBA draft and by the Virginia Squires in the 1970 American Basketball Association Draft.

Perry played for the NBA's San Diego / Houston Rockets (1970–71), Milwaukee Bucks (1971–74) and Phoenix Suns (1974–78).

In his rookie season with San Diego in 1970–71, he was sent to the Northwest Travellers of the Continental Basketball Association in January 1971 and returned to the Rockets in March. He helped the Bucks win the 1971–72 and 1972–73 NBA Midwest Division titles, and the 1973–74 NBA Western Conference championship. He also helped the Phoenix Suns win the 1975–76 NBA Western Conference championship. On February 15, 1975, Perry scored 26 points and grabbed a career-high 22 rebounds in a 111–107 loss against the Atlanta Hawks. In the 1976 Finals, Perry was a key player in "the greatest game ever played" in NBA history.

In 8 NBA seasons, Perry played in 480 games and had 13,656 minutes played, a .455 field goal percentage (1,904 for 4,188), .699 free throw percentage (770 for 1,101), 4,239 rebounds, 906 assists, 1,670 personal fouls and 4,578 points. He averaged 9.5 points, 8.8 rebounds and 1.9 assists per game.

He was inducted into the Missouri State athletic Hall of Fame in 1980.

== NBA career statistics ==
Legend
GP	Games played	GS	Games started	MPG	Minutes per game
FG%	Field goal percentage	3P%	3-point field goal percentage	FT%	Free throw percentage
RPG	Rebounds per game	APG	Assists per game	SPG	Steals per game
BPG	Blocks per game	PPG	Points per game	**Bold**	Career high
*	Led the league

=== Regular season ===
Year	Team	GP	GS	MPG	FG%	3P%	FT%	RPG	APG	SPG	BPG	PPG
1970–71	San Diego	18	-	5.6	.438	-	.550	1.7	0.3	-	-	2.9
1971–72	Houston	25	-	14.2	.330	-	.500	4.9	0.9	-	-	3.5
1971–72	Milwaukee	50	-	29.4	.385	-	.674	9.4	1.6	-	-	7.0
1972–73	Milwaukee	67	-	31.3	.461	-	.659	9.6	1.8	-	-	9.1
1973–74	Milwaukee	**81**	-	29.5	.446	-	.582	8.7	2.3	1.3	**1.2**	9.0
1974–75	Phoenix	79	-	**34.0**	.477	-	.719	**11.9**	2.4	**1.4**	1.0	**13.4**
1975–76	Phoenix	71	-	33.1	**.497**	-	.732	9.6	**2.6**	1.2	0.9	13.3
1976–77	Phoenix	44	-	31.6	.432	-	**.789**	9.0	1.8	1.1	0.6	10.7
1977–78	Phoenix	45	-	18.2	.453	-	.785	5.6	1.1	0.8	0.5	6.0
Career		480	-	28.5	.455	-	.699	8.8	1.9	1.2	0.9	9.5

=== Playoffs ===
Year	Team	GP	GS	MPG	FG%	3P%	FT%	RPG	APG	SPG	BPG	PPG
1971–72	Milwaukee	11	-	36.1	.473	-	**.783**	**12.8**	1.3	-	-	9.5
1972–73	Milwaukee	6	-	**39.7**	.481	-	.500	11.5	**2.2**	-	-	8.8
1973–74	Milwaukee	16	-	18.5	**.500**	-	.583	5.1	0.8	**0.6**	0.1	6.2
1975–76	Phoenix	**19***	-	32.4	.454	-	.647	7.7	1.9	**0.6**	**0.9**	**12.7**
Career		52	-	29.7	.470	-	.661	8.4	1.4	0.6	0.5	9.6

== Personal life ==
Perry is the father of former NBA player Byron Houston and has a daughter named Leslie Hardin. (1970).
