= Dick Cunningham =

American basketball player

Personal information
- Born: July 11, 1946 (age 80) Canton, Ohio, U.S.
- Listed height: 6 ft 10 in (2.08 m)
- Listed weight: 245 lb (111 kg)

Career information
- High school: Canton South (Canton, Ohio)
- College: Murray State (1965–1968)
- NBA draft: 1968: 2nd round, 21st overall pick
- Drafted by: Phoenix Suns
- Playing career: 1968–1975
- Position: Center
- Number: 19, 34

Career history
- 1968–1971: Milwaukee Bucks
- 1971–1972: Houston Rockets
- 1972–1975: Milwaukee Bucks

Career highlights
- NBA champion (1971); NCAA rebounding leader (1967)

Career statistics
- Points: 1,012 (2.8 ppg)
- Rebounds: 1,324 (3.7 rpg)
- Assists: 221 (0.6 apg)
- Stats at NBA.com
- Stats at Basketball Reference

Dick Cunningham (born July 11, 1946) is an American former professional basketball player who played seven seasons in the National Basketball Association (NBA).

A 6'10" center born in Canton, Ohio, Cunningham led NCAA Division I in rebounding as a junior at Murray State University with a school-record 21.8 rebounds per game in the 1966–67 season. He was selected to the All-Ohio Valley Conference basketball team in 1967 and 1968. In three seasons with the Murray State varsity, Cunningham scored 981 points and grabbed 1,292 rebounds in 71 games. His 479 rebounds in 1966–67 and his career rebounding average of 18.2 rebounds per game still stand as Murray State records. He was inducted into the Murray State Athletics Hall of Fame in 1986.

Cunningham was the 21st overall selection in the 1968 NBA draft by the Phoenix Suns and also was picked by the New York Nets in the American Basketball Association draft. Traded by the Suns to the Milwaukee Bucks before the 1968–69 season, Cunningham played seven seasons (1968–1975) in the NBA as a member of the Bucks and Houston Rockets. He averaged 2.8 points per game and 3.7 rebounds per game in his career and won an NBA championship with Milwaukee in 1971.

== NBA career statistics ==
Legend
GP	Games played	GS	Games started	MPG	Minutes per game
FG%	Field goal percentage	3P%	3-point field goal percentage	FT%	Free throw percentage
RPG	Rebounds per game	APG	Assists per game	SPG	Steals per game
BPG	Blocks per game	PPG	Points per game	**Bold**	Career high

=== Regular season ===
Year	Team	GP	GS	MPG	FG%	3P%	FT%	RPG	APG	SPG	BPG	PPG
1968–69	Milwaukee	**77**	-	**16.1**	.425	-	.651	**5.7**	0.8	-	-	**4.6**
1969–70	Milwaukee	60	-	6.9	.369	-	.667	2.7	0.5	-	-	2.1
1970–71	Milwaukee	76	-	8.9	.415	-	.661	3.4	0.6	-	-	2.6
1971–72	Houston	63	-	11.4	.385	-	**.698**	3.9	**0.9**	-	-	2.7
1972–73	Milwaukee	72	-	9.6	.410	-	.580	2.9	0.5	-	-	2.2
1973–74	Milwaukee	8	-	5.6	**.500**	-	.000	2.0	0.0	**0.3**	**0.3**	0.8
1974–75	Milwaukee	2	-	4.0	.000	-	.000	1.0	0.5	0.0	0.0	0.0
Career		358	-	10.6	.406	-	.636	3.7	0.6	0.2	0.2	2.8

=== Playoffs ===
Year	Team	GP	GS	MPG	FG%	3P%	FT%	RPG	APG	SPG	BPG	PPG
1969–70	Milwaukee	8	-	5.6	.556	-	.500	1.5	0.3	-	-	**2.6**
1970–71	Milwaukee	**14**	-	**6.4**	.429	-	**.667**	**1.7**	0.1	-	-	1.7
1972–73	Milwaukee	5	-	3.4	**1.000**	-	.000	0.6	**0.4**	-	-	0.4
Career		27	-	5.6	.500	-	.636	1.4	0.2	-	-	1.7

== See also ==
- List of NCAA Division I men's basketball season rebounding leaders
