= Dick Garrett =

American basketball player

Personal information
- Born: January 31, 1947 (age 79) Centralia, Illinois, U.S.
- Listed height: 6 ft 3 in (1.91 m)
- Listed weight: 185 lb (84 kg)

Career information
- High school: Centralia (Centralia, Illinois)
- College: Southern Illinois (1966–1969)
- NBA draft: 1969: 2nd round, 27th overall pick
- Drafted by: Los Angeles Lakers
- Playing career: 1969–1974
- Position: Shooting guard / point guard
- Number: 20, 14, 24

Career history
- 1969–1970: Los Angeles Lakers
- 1970–1973: Buffalo Braves
- 1973: New York Knicks
- 1973–1974: Milwaukee Bucks

Career highlights
- NBA All-Rookie First Team (1970)

Career NBA statistics
- Points: 3,475 (10.3 ppg)
- Rebounds: 1,004 (3.0 rpg)
- Assists: 849 (2.5 apg)
- Stats at NBA.com
- Stats at Basketball Reference

Eldo "Dick" Garrett (born January 31, 1947) is an American former professional basketball player who played five seasons in the National Basketball Association (NBA). He played college basketball for the Southern Illinois Salukis.

== Career ==
A 6'3" guard from Southern Illinois University, Garrett was selected by the Los Angeles Lakers with the 27th overall pick of the 1969 NBA draft. He played five seasons (1969–1974) in the National Basketball Association, one with the Lakers, three with the Buffalo Braves, and his final season that he split between the New York Knicks and the Milwaukee Bucks. He earned NBA All-Rookie Team honors during the 1969–70 NBA season after averaging 11.6 points per game for the Lakers.

== NBA career statistics ==
Legend
| GP | Games played | GS | Games started | MPG | Minutes per game |
| FG% | Field goal percentage | 3P% | 3-point field goal percentage | FT% | Free throw percentage |
| RPG | Rebounds per game | APG | Assists per game | SPG | Steals per game |
| BPG | Blocks per game | PPG | Points per game | **Bold** | Career high |

=== Regular season ===
| Year | Team | GP | GS | MPG | FG% | 3P% | FT% | RPG | APG | SPG | BPG | PPG |
|---|---|---|---|---|---|---|---|---|---|---|---|---|
| 1969–70 | Los Angeles | 73 | - | **31.8** | .434 | - | .852 | 3.2 | 2.5 | - | - | 11.6 |
| 1970–71 | Buffalo | 75 | - | 31.7 | .414 | - | .869 | **3.9** | **3.5** | - | - | **12.9** |
| 1971–72 | Buffalo | 73 | - | 26.1 | **.442** | - | .866 | 3.1 | 2.3 | - | - | 10.8 |
| 1972–73 | Buffalo | **78** | - | 23.1 | .419 | - | **.873** | 2.7 | 2.8 | - | - | 10.0 |
| 1973–74 | New York | 25 | - | 9.6 | .352 | - | .769 | 1.0 | 0.6 | **0.3** | 0.0 | 3.0 |
| 1973–74 | Milwaukee | 15 | - | 5.8 | .314 | - | .833 | 0.9 | 0.6 | 0.2 | 0.0 | 1.8 |
| Career | | 339 | - | 25.7 | .423 | - | .863 | 3.0 | 2.5 | 0.3 | 0.0 | 10.3 |

=== Playoffs ===
| Year | Team | GP | GS | MPG | FG% | 3P% | FT% | RPG | APG | SPG | BPG | PPG |
|---|---|---|---|---|---|---|---|---|---|---|---|---|
| 1969–70 | Los Angeles | **18** | - | **33.1** | **.510** | - | **.875** | **2.9** | **2.2** | - | - | **12.8** |
| 1973–74 | Milwaukee | 8 | - | 5.8 | .286 | - | .500 | 0.4 | 0.9 | **0.3** | 0.0 | 0.8 |
| Career | | 26 | - | 24.7 | .502 | - | .833 | 2.1 | 1.8 | 0.3 | 0.0 | 9.1 |

== Personal life ==
Following his NBA career, Garrett worked for Miller Brewing Company as an account representative, and as a security guard at Milwaukee Bucks home games.

His son Diante Garrett has played for the Phoenix Suns and the Utah Jazz. His son Damon played basketball at UW-Whitewater. His daughter Jermia died from a severe asthma attack.
