= Chuck Terry =

American basketball player

Personal information
- Born: September 27, 1950 (age 76) Long Beach, California, U. S.
- Listed height: 6 ft 6 in (1.98 m)
- Listed weight: 215 lb (98 kg)

Career information
- High school: Jordan (Long Beach, California)
- College: Long Beach CC (1968–1970); Long Beach State (1970–1972)
- NBA draft: 1972: 2nd round, 29th overall pick
- Drafted by: Milwaukee Bucks
- Playing career: 1972–1977
- Position: Small forward
- Number: 31, 30, 12

Career history
- 1972–1973: Milwaukee Bucks
- 1973–1975: San Antonio Spurs
- 1975–1977: New York Nets

Career highlights
- ABA champion (1976); 2× First-team All-PCAA (1971, 1972)

Career ABA and NBA statistics
- Points: 1,298 (3.8 ppg)
- Rebounds: 818 (2.4 rpg)
- Assists: 262 (0.8 apg)
- Stats at NBA.com
- Stats at Basketball Reference

Alan Charles Terry (born September 27, 1950) is an American retired professional basketball player. Terry was drafted by the Milwaukee Bucks in the second round of the 1972 NBA draft. He played small forward with the team for two seasons. Following his time with the Bucks, Terry was a member of the San Antonio Spurs of the American Basketball Association (ABA) until 1975. After playing another season in the ABA with the New York Nets, Terry re-joined the NBA when the Nets joined the league in 1976.

== Career statistics ==
Legend
GP	Games played	GS	Games started	MPG	Minutes per game
FG%	Field goal percentage	3P%	3-point field goal percentage	FT%	Free throw percentage
RPG	Rebounds per game	APG	Assists per game	SPG	Steals per game
BPG	Blocks per game	PPG	Points per game	**Bold**	Career high
†	Won an NBA championship

=== NBA ===
==== Regular season ====
Year	Team	GP	GS	MPG	FG%	3P%	FT%	RPG	APG	SPG	BPG	PPG
1972–73	Milwaukee	**67**	–	10.3	.340	–	.708	2.2	**0.6**	–	–	1.9
1973–74	Milwaukee	7	–	4.6	.333	–	.000	0.4	**0.6**	0.3	0.0	1.1
1976–77	New York	61	–	**17.6**	**.403**	–	**.774**	**2.3**	**0.6**	**1.0**	**0.2**	**5.0**
Career		135	–	13.3	.380	–	.756	2.2	0.6	0.9	0.1	3.3

==== Playoffs ====
Year	Team	GP	GS	MPG	FG%	3P%	FT%	RPG	APG	SPG	BPG	PPG
1972–73	Milwaukee	**5**	–	**3.6**	**.800**	–	.000	**0.6**	**0.2**	–	–	**1.6**
Career		5	–	3.6	.800	–	.000	0.6	0.2	–	–	1.6

=== ABA ===
==== Regular season ====
Year	Team	GP	GS	MPG	FG%	3P%	FT%	RPG	APG	SPG	BPG	PPG
1973–74	San Antonio	61	–	**17.9**	.449	**.500**	**.878**	**2.7**	**1.2**	0.3	**0.1**	**4.9**
1974–75	San Antonio	**79**	–	15.0	**.473**	.375	.736	**2.7**	0.9	**0.5**	0.0	4.3
1975–76†	New York	66	–	14.7	.390	.286	.759	2.2	0.6	**0.5**	**0.1**	3.3
Career		206	–	15.8	.441	.323	.789	2.6	0.9	0.4	0.1	4.2

==== Playoffs ====
Year	Team	GP	GS	MPG	FG%	3P%	FT%	RPG	APG	SPG	BPG	PPG
1973–74	San Antonio	**7**	–	16.0	.458	.000	.667	3.4	**1.0**	0.0	0.0	3.7
1974–75	San Antonio	5	–	**24.6**	**.480**	.000	**.750**	**3.8**	0.4	**0.6**	**0.2**	**5.4**
1975–76†	Nets	4	–	5.8	.000	.000	.000	0.5	0.3	0.0	0.0	0.0
Career		16	–	16.1	.411	.000	.700	2.8	0.6	0.2	0.1	3.3
