= Jon McGlocklin =

American basketball player

Personal information
- Born: June 10, 1943 (age 83) Franklin, Indiana, U.S.
- Listed height: 6 ft 5 in (1.96 m)
- Listed weight: 205 lb (93 kg)

Career information
- High school: Franklin (Franklin, Indiana)
- College: Indiana (1962–1965)
- NBA draft: 1965: 3rd round, 24th overall pick
- Drafted by: Cincinnati Royals
- Playing career: 1965–1976
- Position: Shooting guard / small forward
- Number: 11, 14

Career history
- 1965–1967: Cincinnati Royals
- 1967–1968: San Diego Rockets
- 1968–1976: Milwaukee Bucks

Career highlights
- NBA champion (1971); NBA All-Star (1969); No. 14 retired by Milwaukee Bucks

Career statistics
- Points: 9,169 (11.6 ppg)
- Rebounds: 1,928 (2.4 rpg)
- Assists: 2,280 (2.9 apg)
- Stats at NBA.com
- Stats at Basketball Reference

Jon P. McGlocklin (born June 10, 1943) is an American former professional basketball player. Born in Franklin, Indiana, McGlocklin spent over a decade in the National Basketball Association (NBA) after being drafted by the Cincinnati Royals in 1965. He is best known, however, for his six-decade association with the Milwaukee Bucks. He played the last eight seasons of his career in Milwaukee, making the NBA All-Star Game in 1969 and helping lead the Bucks to the 1971 NBA title. After retiring from the NBA in 1976, McGlocklin went on to become a television commentator for the Bucks, also having his number retired by the franchise.

== Playing career ==
A sharpshooting 6'5" guard from Indiana University, McGlockin was selected by the Cincinnati Royals in the third round of the 1965 NBA draft. After two seasons there, he was left unprotected in the 1967 expansion draft and selected by the San Diego Rockets. He only stayed one season in San Diego before being left unprotected in the 1968 expansion draft, in which he was taken by the Milwaukee Bucks.

McGlocklin stayed in Milwaukee for eight years, helping lead the Bucks to the NBA Championship (as a teammate of Kareem Abdul-Jabbar and Oscar Robertson) in 1971. He scored 9,169 points in his NBA career, and his #14 jersey has been retired by the Bucks franchise. He also represented the Bucks in the 1969 NBA All-Star Game.

McGlocklin was best known for his high-arcing "rainbow" jump shot from the wings, in what would now be three-point territory. It was most effective when paired in a two-man play with Jabbar: if the opposing guard fell back to double-team Jabbar, McGlocklin would make them pay from the perimeter; when the guard came out to defend him, he would pass the ball down to Jabbar with only one defender, who under most circumstances was out-matched.

McGlocklin was selected as one of the "Top 50 Basketball Players" of the 20th Century, in his home state of Indiana, as well as being inducted into the Indiana Basketball Hall of Fame, Wisconsin Basketball Coaches Association and the Wisconsin Athletic Hall of Fame.

== Announcing ==
McLocklin retired at the end of the 1975–76 season; he was the last member of the Bucks' inaugural roster still on the team. He immediately joined the Bucks' television broadcast team as color commentator, a post he has held for 45 years. He and play-by-play announcer Jim Paschke called Bucks games together for 35 years until Paschke's retirement at the end of the 2020–21 season.

Having been associated with the Bucks franchise for every year of its existence, he is often called "Mr. Buck" and "The Original Buck" by Bucks fans.

== Business and charity ==
On the night of his retirement in 1976, McLocklin, along with Eddie Doucette founded the MACC Fund, which has become nationally recognized in its fight against childhood cancer and has raised over $45 million toward childhood cancer research.

Both he and Sal Bando established the Bando McGlocklin Capital Corporation in 1979. The firm was renamed The Middleton Doll Company on May 4, 2001, to reflect its acquisition of Lee Middleton Original Dolls Inc.

== NBA career statistics ==
Legend
GP	Games played	GS	Games started	MPG	Minutes per game
FG%	Field goal percentage	3P%	3-point field goal percentage	FT%	Free throw percentage
RPG	Rebounds per game	APG	Assists per game	SPG	Steals per game
BPG	Blocks per game	PPG	Points per game	**Bold**	Career high
†	Won an NBA championship

=== Regular season ===
Year	Team	GP	MPG	FG%	FT%	RPG	APG	STL	BLK	PPG
1965–66	Cincinnati	72	11.8	.421	.785	1.8	1.2	–	–	5.1
1966–67	Cincinnati	60	19.9	.440	.712	2.7	1.6	–	–	8.5
1967–68	San Diego	65	28.9	.417	.867	3.1	2.7	–	–	12.1
1968–69	Milwaukee	80	36.1	.487	.842	**4.3**	**3.9**	–	–	**19.6**
1969–70	Milwaukee	**82**	**36.2**	.530	.854	3.1	3.7	–	–	17.6
1970–71†	Milwaukee	**82**	35.3	**.535**	.862	2.7	3.7	–	–	15.8
1971–72	Milwaukee	80	27.7	.510	.865	2.3	2.9	–	–	10.7
1972–73	Milwaukee	80	24.4	.502	.863	2.0	3.0	–	–	9.6
1973–74	Milwaukee	79	24.2	.475	**.900**	1.8	3.1	0.5	**0.1**	9.2
1974–75	Milwaukee	79	23.5	.496	.875	1.5	3.2	**0.6**	**0.1**	9.0
1975–76	Milwaukee	33	10.2	.426	**.900**	0.5	1.2	0.2	0.0	4.1
Career		792	26.4	.489	.845	2.4	2.9	0.5	0.1	11.6
All-Star		1	7.0	.500	–	1.0	0.0	–	–	2.0

=== Playoffs ===
Year	Team	GP	MPG	FG%	FT%	RPG	APG	STL	BLK	PPG
1966	Cincinnati	4	16.5	.483	**1.000**	2.0	1.0	–	–	7.5
1970	Milwaukee	10	**37.7**	.431	.806	**3.6**	2.1	–	–	**14.9**
1971†	Milwaukee	**14**	35.1	.536	.848	2.2	2.4	–	–	**14.9**
1972	Milwaukee	5	20.6	.429	.833	.6	1.2	–	–	7.0
1973	Milwaukee	6	24.2	.509	.875	1.2	2.2	–	–	10.2
1974	Milwaukee	**14**	23.8	.495	.727	1.1	**3.1**	.4	**.1**	8.4
1976	Milwaukee	2	6.5	**.750**	–	.5	.5	**.5**	.0	3.0
Career		55	27.8	.489	.824	1.9	2.2	.4	.1	11.0
