= Bob Dandridge =

American basketball player (born 1947)

Personal information
- Born: November 15, 1947 (age 78) Richmond, Virginia, U.S.
- Listed height: 6 ft 6 in (1.98 m)
- Listed weight: 195 lb (88 kg)

Career information
- High school: Maggie Walker (Richmond, Virginia)
- College: Norfolk State (1965–1969)
- NBA draft: 1969: 4th round, 45th overall pick
- Drafted by: Milwaukee Bucks
- Playing career: 1969–1981
- Position: Small forward / shooting guard
- Number: 10

Career history
- 1969–1977: Milwaukee Bucks
- 1977–1981: Washington Bullets
- 1981: Milwaukee Bucks

Career highlights
- 2× NBA champion (1971, 1978); 4× NBA All-Star (1973, 1975, 1976, 1979); All-NBA Second Team (1979); NBA All-Defensive First Team (1979); NBA All-Rookie First Team (1970); No. 10 retired by Milwaukee Bucks; No. 12 retired by Norfolk State Spartans

Career statistics
- Points: 15,530 (18.5 ppg)
- Rebounds: 5,715 (6.8 rpg)
- Assists: 2,846 (3.4 apg)
- Stats at NBA.com
- Stats at Basketball Reference
- Basketball Hall of Fame

Robert L. Dandridge Jr. (born November 15, 1947) is an American former professional basketball player. Nicknamed "the Greyhound", Dandridge was a four-time NBA All-Star and two-time NBA champion, who scored 15,530 points in his career. He was elected to the Basketball Hall of Fame in 2021.

== Early years ==
Born in Richmond, Virginia, he attended Maggie L. Walker High School in Richmond and Norfolk State University, teaming up with Pee Wee Kirkland. His teams had phenomenal years. The Spartans won the CIAA title in 1968 with a 25–2 record; they lost in the second round of the NCAA Division II Men's Tournament. The next year their record was 21–4 and they lost in the first round of the D-II tournament. He was drafted by the Kentucky Colonels in the 1969 American Basketball Association draft and by the Milwaukee Bucks in the fourth round of the 1969 NBA draft.

== Basketball career ==
Dandridge was named to the NBA All-Rookie Team in 1970. In just his second season, Dandridge played an important part on the Milwaukee Bucks team that won the NBA championship in 1971, averaging 19.2 points, 9.6 rebounds, and 3.4 assists per playoff game, alongside the Hall-of-Fame duo of Lew Alcindor (Kareem Abdul-Jabbar) and Oscar Robertson. In Game 3 of that finals series, Dandridge led all scorers with 29 points, while also recording 10 rebounds. On January 23, 1976, Dandridge scored a career high 40 points in a 113–97 win over the Kansas City Kings. He played a total of 13 seasons in the NBA, nine of them with the Bucks as well as four with the Washington Bullets, with whom he won an NBA championship in 1978 during his first season with the team, while forming the frontcourt with another future Hall-of-Fame duo: Elvin Hayes and Wes Unseld. In Game 2 of the 1978 NBA Finals, Dandridge led all scorers with 34 points en route to a Bullets win. His dunk in Game 7 of the 1978 Finals sealed the Bullets championship victory. Dandridge returned to the Bucks for 11 games in 1981, before retiring.

In his career, he averaged 18.5 points per game over 839 regular season games and 20 points per game in 98 playoff games and was a four-time NBA all star. Dandridge is usually mentioned as one of the NBA's best forwards in the 1970s.

Dandridge scored more points in the NBA Finals in the 1970s than any other player, including Kareem Abdul-Jabbar. He scored a total of 450 points in four NBA Finals played, playing a total of 23 games, garnering an average of over 19 points a game, most notably scoring 109 points in the 1979 NBA Finals, which was the most on his Washington Bullets team.

In 1992, Dandridge was inducted into the Virginia Sports Hall of Fame.

In 2021 Dandridge was elected to the Naismith Memorial Basketball Hall of Fame.

== Retirement ==
After retiring as a player, Dandridge served as an assistant coach at Hampton University from 1987 to 1992. Today, he lives in Norfolk, Virginia and conducts basketball clinics.

== NBA career statistics ==
Legend
GP	Games played	GS	Games started	MPG	Minutes per game
FG%	Field goal percentage	3P%	3-point field goal percentage	FT%	Free throw percentage
RPG	Rebounds per game	APG	Assists per game	SPG	Steals per game
BPG	Blocks per game	PPG	Points per game	**Bold**	Career high
†	Won an NBA championship

=== Regular season ===
Year	Team	GP	GS	MPG	FG%	3P%	FT%	RPG	APG	SPG	BPG	PPG
1969–70	Milwaukee	**81**	–	30.4	.485	–	.754	7.7	3.6	–	–	13.2
1970–71†	Milwaukee	79	–	36.2	**.509**	–	.702	8.0	3.5	–	–	18.4
1971–72	Milwaukee	80	–	37.0	.498	–	.739	7.7	3.1	–	–	18.4
1972–73	Milwaukee	73	–	**39.1**	.472	–	.789	**8.2**	2.8	–	–	20.2
1973–74	Milwaukee	71	–	35.5	.503	–	.818	6.7	2.8	**1.6**	0.6	18.9
1974–75	Milwaukee	80	–	37.9	.473	–	.805	6.9	3.0	1.5	0.6	19.9
1975–76	Milwaukee	73	–	37.5	.502	–	.824	7.4	2.8	1.5	0.5	**21.5**
1976–77	Milwaukee	70	–	35.7	.467	–	.771	6.3	3.8	1.4	0.4	20.8
1977–78†	Washington	75	–	37.0	.471	–	.788	5.9	3.8	1.3	0.6	19.3
1978–79	Washington	78	–	33.7	.499	–	**.825**	5.7	**4.7**	0.9	0.7	20.4
1979–80	Washington	45	–	32.4	.451	**.182**	.809	5.5	4.0	0.6	**0.8**	17.4
1980–81	Washington	23	–	23.7	.426	.000	.718	3.6	2.6	0.7	0.4	10.0
1981–82	Milwaukee	11	0	15.8	.382	–	.588	1.5	1.2	0.5	0.2	4.7
Career		839	–	35.2	.484	.167	.780	6.8	3.4	1.3	0.6	18.5
All-Star		4	1	18.5	.480	–	.667	3.5	0.5	1.3	0.0	6.5

=== Playoffs ===
Year	Team	GP	GS	MPG	FG%	3P%	FT%	RPG	APG	SPG	BPG	PPG
1970	Milwaukee	10	–	39.9	**.507**	–	.655	8.7	**5.7**	–	–	16.3
1971†	Milwaukee	14	–	38.2	.463	–	.782	**9.6**	3.4	–	–	19.2
1972	Milwaukee	11	–	40.1	.495	–	.740	8.8	1.9	–	–	21.5
1973	Milwaukee	6	–	34.0	.421	–	.704	4.7	1.2	–	–	13.8
1974	Milwaukee	16	–	40.5	.493	–	.766	7.6	2.8	1.4	0.6	19.3
1976	Milwaukee	3	–	40.7	.490	–	**.900**	7.7	2.7	1.0	0.0	22.0
1978†	Washington	**19**	–	39.3	.479	–	.690	6.5	3.9	**1.6**	0.7	21.2
1979	Washington	**19**	–	**41.4**	.473	–	.827	7.4	5.5	0.7	**0.8**	**23.1**
Career		98	–	39.6	.480	–	.761	7.7	3.7	1.2	0.7	20.1
