= Jim Barnett (basketball) =

American basketball player (born 1944)

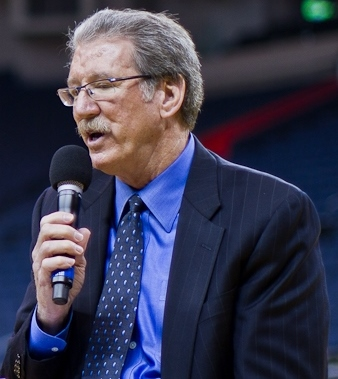
- Barnett conducts an interview in 2011

Personal information
- Born: July 7, 1944 (age 82) Greenville, South Carolina, U.S.
- Listed height: 6 ft 4 in (1.93 m)
- Listed weight: 170 lb (77 kg)

Career information
- High school: Ramona (Riverside, California)
- College: Oregon (1963–1966)
- NBA draft: 1966: 1st round, 8th overall pick
- Drafted by: Boston Celtics
- Playing career: 1966–1977
- Position: Small forward / shooting guard
- Number: 11, 33, 25

Career history
- 1966–1967: Boston Celtics
- 1967–1970: San Diego Rockets
- 1970–1971: Portland Trail Blazers
- 1971–1974: Golden State Warriors
- 1974–1975: New Orleans Jazz
- 1975–1976: New York Knicks
- 1977: Philadelphia 76ers

Career highlights
- First-team All-AAWU (1966); Second-team All-AAWU (1965)

Career NBA statistics
- Points: 8,536 (11.7 ppg)
- Rebounds: 2,259 (3.1 rpg)
- Assists: 2,232 (3.0 apg)
- Stats at NBA.com
- Stats at Basketball Reference

James Franklin Barnett (born July 7, 1944) is an American former professional basketball player. He was the Golden State Warriors television analyst from 1985 to 2019, and currently splits time with Tom Tolbert as the team's radio color analyst on 95.7 The Game.

== Basketball career ==
=== Youth and college career ===
Barnett was born in Greenville, South Carolina and raised in Riverside, California. He is a member of the Riverside Hall of Fame and was selected as an NCAA All-American as a University of Oregon basketball player.

He is in the University of Oregon Hall of Fame and the State of Oregon Hall of Fame. He was inducted into the Pac-12 Basketball Hall of Honor during the 2012 Pac-12 Conference men's basketball tournament on March 10, 2012.

=== Pro career ===
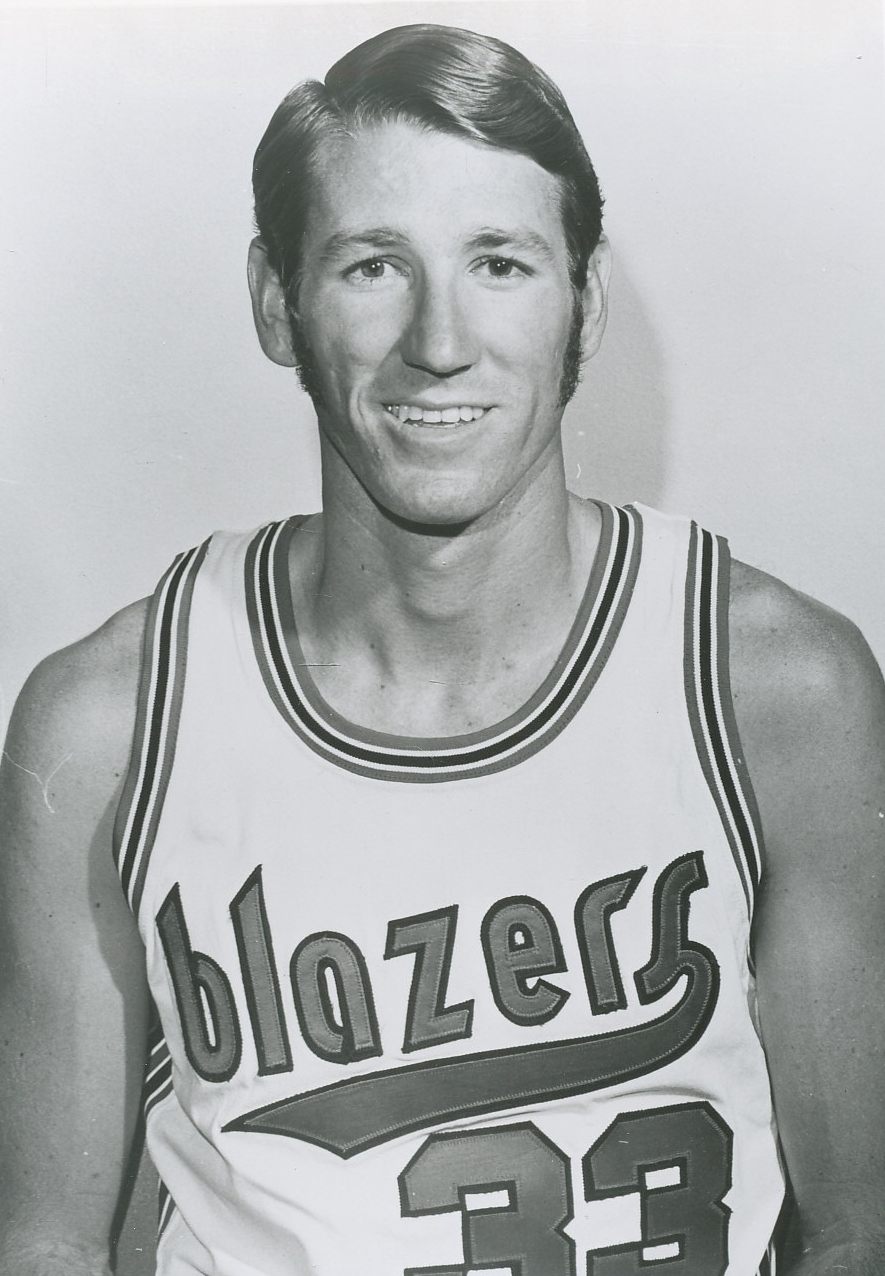
Barnett in 1970 as a Portland Trail Blazers player

Barnett's NBA career began when the Boston Celtics selected him with the eighth pick overall in the 1966 NBA draft. He later played for the Warriors for three seasons (1971–74) and five other teams during his 11-year career, including the San Diego Rockets, the Portland Trail Blazers, the New Orleans Jazz, New York Knicks, and the Philadelphia 76ers.

While playing for the Trail Blazers in 1971, Barnett attempted a rushed long-range shot against the rival Los Angeles Lakers. His shot went in, prompting Blazers play-by-play announcer Bill Schonely to exclaim "Rip City! All right!" The phrase "Rip City", the meaning for which Schonely has no explanation, nonetheless caught on and became synonymous with the team and the city of Portland.

Barnett played alongside many of the league's Hall of Famers, including Warriors stars Rick Barry and Nate Thurmond, as well as Bill Russell, John Havlicek, Walt Frazier, Earl Monroe, Pete Maravich and Julius Erving. Nicknamed "Crazy Horse", Barnett averaged 11.7 points, 3.1 rebounds and 3.0 assists in 732 career games.

== Broadcasting ==
Barnett currently works for NBC Sports Bay Area and was the Warriors' television analyst from the 1985–1986 NBA season, working alongside play-by-play announcer Bob Fitzgerald until the 2018—2019 NBA season. During the playoffs, or when games were nationally televised, he moved over to radio and worked alongside Tim Roye on KGMZ-FM's 95.7 The Game.

Beginning with the 2019—2020 NBA season, he became the Warriors' full-time color analyst on 95.7 The Game, and was replaced by fellow former player Kelenna Azubuike as the color commentator on NBC Sports Bay Area. Barnett joined Fitzgerald for the first Warriors home game telecast from the Chase Center in San Francisco, and travels with the team for road games.

== Personal life ==
Barnett married his wife Sandy in 1966. Divorced in 1998. They have one daughter named Jennifer, along with one granddaughter, Stella.

== Career statistics ==
Legend
GP	Games played	GS	Games started	MPG	Minutes per game
FG%	Field goal percentage	3P%	3-point field goal percentage	FT%	Free throw percentage
RPG	Rebounds per game	APG	Assists per game	SPG	Steals per game
BPG	Blocks per game	PPG	Points per game	**Bold**	Career high
*	Led the league

=== NBA ===
==== Regular season ====
Year	Team	GP	GS	MPG	FG%	FT%	RPG	APG	SPG	BPG	PPG
1966–67	Boston	48		8.0	.370	.677	1.1	.9			4.1
1967–68	San Diego	47		22.7	.393	.712	3.3	2.9			9.4
1968–69	San Diego	80		29.3	.425	.752	4.5	**4.2**			14.5
1969–70	San Diego	80		26.3	.451	.790	3.8	3.6			14.9
1970–71	Portland	78		**30.4**	.436	.811	**4.8**	4.1			**18.5**
1971–72	Golden State	80		27.5	.409	.836	3.1	3.9			12.4
1972–73	Golden State	**82***		27.0	**.467**	.843	3.1	3.7			11.8
1973–74	Golden State	77		21.9	.464	.814	2.9	2.7	.7	.1	11.5
1974–75	New Orleans	45		27.5	.448	.830	2.8	3.0	**.8**	**.4**	13.0
1974–75	New York	28	**4**	19.2	.407	**.860**	1.8	1.4	.4	.0	6.5
1975–76	New York	71	1	14.5	.442	.789	1.2	1.3	.3	.0	5.9
1976–77	Philadelphia	16	0	14.4	.438	.556	.9	1.4	.3	.0	4.1
Career		732	5	23.8	.435	.797	3.1	3.0	.6	.1	11.7

==== Playoffs ====
Year	Team	GP	GS	MPG	FG%	FT%	RPG	APG	SPG	BPG	PPG
1967	Boston	5		5.2	.286	**1.000**	.8	.2			2.8
1969	San Diego	6		8.5	.391	.875	.5	1.2			4.2
1972	Golden State	5		**39.4**	.429	.732	**4.0**	**5.2**			**21.6**
1973	Golden State	**11**		30.5	.408	.852	3.5	3.5			13.0
1975	New York	3	0	19.7	**.619**	**1.000**	2.7	1.7	.3	.3	10.3
Career		30	0	22.3	.419	.807	2.5	2.6	.3	.3	10.7
