= Dennis Awtrey =

American basketball player (born 1948)

Personal information
- Born: February 22, 1948 (age 78) Hollywood, California, U.S.
- Listed height: 6 ft 10 in (2.08 m)
- Listed weight: 235 lb (107 kg)

Career information
- High school: Blackford (San Jose, California)
- College: Santa Clara (1967–1970)
- NBA draft: 1970: 3rd round, 46th overall pick
- Drafted by: Philadelphia 76ers
- Playing career: 1970–1982
- Position: Center
- Number: 20, 21, 34

Career history
- 1970–1972: Philadelphia 76ers
- 1972–1974: Chicago Bulls
- 1974–1978: Phoenix Suns
- 1978–1979: Boston Celtics
- 1979: Seattle SuperSonics
- 1979–1980: Chicago Bulls
- 1980–1981: Seattle SuperSonics
- 1981–1982: Portland Trail Blazers

Career highlights
- NBA champion (1979); 2× WCAC Player of the Year (1969, 1970); 3× First-team All-WCAC (1968–1970); No. 24 retired by Santa Clara Broncos; California Mr. Basketball (1966)

Career statistics
- Points: 3,516 (4.8 ppg)
- Rebounds: 3,342 (4.6 rpg)
- Assists: 1,467 (2.8 apg)
- Stats at NBA.com
- Stats at Basketball Reference

Dennis Wade Awtrey (born February 22, 1948) is an American former professional basketball player. A 6'10" center from Santa Clara University, Awtrey was drafted by the NBA's Philadelphia 76ers in 1970. He played in the league for twelve seasons, spending time with the 76ers, Chicago Bulls, Phoenix Suns, Boston Celtics, Seattle SuperSonics, and Portland Trail Blazers. Awtrey had his finest season in 1974–1975, when he averaged 9.9 points and 8.6 rebounds as a member of the Suns. Awtrey was also known for once having punched Kareem Abdul-Jabbar in the jaw. In 2012, Awtrey moved to Manzanita, Oregon, where he now operates a bed-and-breakfast.

== Career statistics ==
Legend
GP	Games played	GS	Games started	MPG	Minutes per game
FG%	Field goal percentage	3P%	3-point field goal percentage	FT%	Free throw percentage
RPG	Rebounds per game	APG	Assists per game	SPG	Steals per game
BPG	Blocks per game	PPG	Points per game	**Bold**	Career high
†	Won an NBA championship	*	Led the league

=== NBA ===
==== Regular season ====
Year	Team	GP	GS	MPG	FG%	3P%	FT%	RPG	APG	SPG	BPG	PPG
1970–71	Philadelphia	70	**38**	18.5	.475		.662	6.1	1.3			7.2
1971–72	Philadelphia	58	7	13.7	.441		.645	4.3	.9			4.2
1972–73	Philadelphia	**3***	2	12.3	.429		.250	4.7	.7			2.3
1972–73	Chicago	**79***	32	20.9	.480		.570	5.5	2.8			4.7
1973–74	Chicago	68	1	11.1	**.528**		.574	2.6	1.3	.3	.2	2.7
1974–75	Phoenix	**82**		**34.6**	.470		.677	**8.6**	**4.2**	**.7**	**.6**	**9.9**
1975–76	Phoenix	74		18.6	.467		.688	4.0	2.1	.3	.3	4.9
1976–77	Phoenix	72		24.4	.429		.722	4.9	2.5	.3	.4	5.7
1977–78	Phoenix	81		20.0	.424		.633	3.7	2.0	.2	.3	3.6
1978–79	Boston	23		10.7	.386		**.800**	2.0	.9	.1	.3	2.2
1978–79†	Seattle	40		12.5	.429		.694	2.6	1.1	.3	.2	2.0
1979–80	Chicago	26	6	21.5	.450	–	.640	4.4	1.5	.5	**.6**	3.3
1980–81	Seattle	47		12.9	.473	–	.700	2.3	1.1	.3	.2	2.2
1981–82	Portland	10	3	12.1	.333	–	.556	1.4	.8	.1	.2	1.5
Career		733	89	19.3	.459	–	.652	4.6	2.0	.4	.3	4.8

==== Playoffs ====
Year	Team	GP	MPG	FG%	FT%	RPG	APG	SPG	BPG	PPG
1971	Philadelphia	7	20.6	.583	.733	3.9	.7			7.6
1973	Chicago	7	**38.3**	.542	.500	**11.0**	**4.4**			**9.0**
1974	Chicago	10	15.8	.429	.600	4.0	1.3	**.6**	.2	3.0
1976	Phoenix	**19***	15.1	.467	.545	3.3	1.3	.3	**.5**	3.2
1978	Phoenix	2	12.0	.250	**1.000**	1.0	1.5	.5	.0	1.5
1979†	Seattle	16	9.6	**.625**	.615	2.6	.7	.3	.3	1.8
Career		61	16.9	.514	.585	4.1	1.4	.4	.3	3.9
