= 1973 NBA playoffs =

Basketball competition

Tournament details
- Dates: March 30–May 10, 1973
- Season: 1972–73
- Teams: 8

Final positions
- Champions: New York Knicks (2nd title)
- Runners-up: Los Angeles Lakers
- Semifinalists: Golden State Warriors; Boston Celtics

The 1973 NBA playoffs was the postseason tournament of the National Basketball Association's 1972–73 season. The tournament concluded with the Eastern Conference champion New York Knicks defeating the Western Conference champion Los Angeles Lakers 4 games to 1 in the NBA Finals. The Knicks won their second NBA title. Willis Reed became the first player to be named NBA Finals MVP twice.

The playoff format was modified, as only the divisional champions qualified automatically; two wild-cards were also added from each conference. Once qualification was determined, the four qualifiers were seeded 1–4 based on record; divisional position no longer mattered. The #1 seed then played #4, and #2 played #3. Because of this new format, New York, the Atlantic Division runner-up, had home-court advantage versus the Baltimore Bullets, the Central Division champion, since the Knicks had the better regular-season record. The Bullets had home-court advantage in the 1972 playoffs versus the Knicks and in the 1971 playoffs versus Philadelphia, even though their record was worse than New York's and Philadelphia's were those seasons, because they had won their division, while the Knicks and Sixers were runners-up.

This was the second straight time (and third in the last 4 years) that the Knicks and Lakers met in the Finals; the Knicks–Lakers rivalry ended with two titles won by the Knicks and one by the Lakers.

This was the Lakers' last appearance in the Finals until 1980; It was New York's last appearance until 1994 and its last championship victory until 2026.

== Bracket ==
Conference Semifinals
E1	Boston*	4
E4	Atlanta	2
Eastern Conference
E3	Baltimore*	1
E2	New York	4
W1	Milwaukee*	2
W4	Golden State	4
Western Conference
W3	Chicago	3
W2	Los Angeles*	4

Conference Finals
E1	Boston*	3
E2	New York	4
W4	Golden State	1
W2	Los Angeles*	4

NBA Finals
E2	New York	4
W2	Los Angeles*	1

- * Division winner
- Bold Series winner
- Italic Team with home-court advantage

== Conference semifinals ==
=== Eastern Conference semifinals ===
==== (1) Boston Celtics vs. (4) Atlanta Hawks ====
April 1

Boxscore

Atlanta Hawks 109, Boston Celtics 134
Scoring by quarter: 24–36, 25–27, 32–36, 28–35
Pts: Lou Hudson 28; Rebs: Jim Washington 14; Asts: Hudson, Maravich 5 each	Pts: John Havlicek 54; Rebs: Dave Cowens 17; Asts: Art Williams 12
Boston leads series, 1–0

Boston Garden, Boston, Massachusetts
Attendance: 11,907

April 4

Boxscore

Boston Celtics 126, Atlanta Hawks 113
Scoring by quarter: 29–13, 28–30, 37–30, 32–40
Pts: John Havlicek 29; Rebs: Dave Cowens 25; Asts: Jo Jo White 11	Pts: Pete Maravich 34; Rebs: Walt Bellamy 11; Asts: Pete Maravich 10
Boston leads series, 2–0

Omni Coliseum, Atlanta, Georgia
Attendance: 11,588

April 6

Boxscore

Atlanta Hawks 118, Boston Celtics 105
Scoring by quarter: 16–29, 39–20, 33–28, 30–28
Pts: Lou Hudson 37; Rebs: Walt Bellamy 12; Asts: Pete Maravich 11	Pts: Jo Jo White 23; Rebs: Dave Cowens 18; Asts: Jo Jo White 10
Boston leads series, 2–1

Boston Garden, Boston, Massachusetts
Attendance: 15,320

April 8

Boxscore

Boston Celtics 94, Atlanta Hawks 97
Scoring by quarter: 24–32, 26–15, 13–30, 31–20
Pts: John Havlicek 21; Rebs: Paul Silas 22; Asts: John Havlicek 5	Pts: Pete Maravich 37; Rebs: Jim Washington 15; Asts: Herm Gilliam 7
Series tied, 2–2

Omni Coliseum, Atlanta, Georgia
Attendance: 11,675

April 11

Boxscore

Atlanta Hawks 101, Boston Celtics 108
Scoring by quarter: 28–30, 26–16, 27–37, 20–25
Pts: Pete Maravich 34; Rebs: Walt Bellamy 16; Asts: Herm Gilliam 6	Pts: John Havlicek 32; Rebs: Dave Cowens 20; Asts: John Havlicek 11
Boston leads series, 3–2

Boston Garden, Boston, Massachusetts
Attendance: 12,525

April 13

Boxscore

Boston Celtics 121, Atlanta Hawks 103
Scoring by quarter: 35–27, 25–31, 26–26, 35–19
Pts: Jo Jo White 33; Rebs: Paul Silas 17; Asts: Jo Jo White 7	Pts: Lou Hudson 35; Rebs: Washington, Bellamy 13 each Asts: Bellamy, Gilliam 5 each
Boston wins series, 4–2

Omni Coliseum, Atlanta, Georgia
Attendance: 16,181

This was the sixth playoff meeting between these two teams, with the Celtics winning four of the first five meetings.

Previous playoff series
Boston leads 4–1 in all-time playoff series

1957

Boston Celtics 4, St. Louis Hawks 3

1957 NBA Finals

1958

Boston Celtics 2, St. Louis Hawks 4

1958 NBA Finals

1960

Boston Celtics 4, St. Louis Hawks 3

1960 NBA Finals

1961

Boston Celtics 4, St. Louis Hawks 1

1961 NBA Finals

1972

Atlanta Hawks 2, Boston Celtics 4

1972 Eastern Conference Semifinals

==== (2) New York Knicks vs. (3) Baltimore Bullets ====
March 30

Boxscore

Baltimore Bullets 83, New York Knicks 95
Scoring by quarter: 25–19, 20–24, 20–27, 18–25
Pts: Archie Clark 22; Rebs: Wes Unseld 16; Asts: Archie Clark 6	Pts: Walt Frazier 25; Rebs: Frazier, DeBusschere 7 each Asts: Walt Frazier 6
New York leads series, 1–0

Madison Square Garden, New York City, New York
Attendance: 19,694

April 1

Boxscore

Baltimore Bullets 103, New York Knicks 123
Scoring by quarter: 25–32, 22–26, 32–29, 24–36
Pts: Phil Chenier 27; Rebs: Wes Unseld 14; Asts: Kevin Porter 7	Pts: Walt Frazier 29; Rebs: Dave DeBusschere 11; Asts: Walt Frazier 13
New York leads series, 2–0

Madison Square Garden, New York City, New York
Attendance: 19,694

April 4

Boxscore

New York Knicks 103, Baltimore Bullets 96
Scoring by quarter: 25–22, 24–24, 25–19, 29–31
Pts: Bill Bradley 23; Rebs: Dave DeBusschere 11; Asts: Walt Frazier 7	Pts: Elvin Hayes 36; Rebs: Elvin Hayes 14; Asts: Riordan, Clark 4 each
New York leads series, 3–0

Baltimore Civic Center, Baltimore, Maryland
Attendance: 12,289

April 6

Boxscore

New York Knicks 89, Baltimore Bullets 97
Scoring by quarter: 14–22, 25–28, 23–28, 27–19
Pts: Walt Frazier 17; Rebs: Willis Reed 8 Asts: DeBusschere, Monroe 4 each	Pts: Elvin Hayes 34; Rebs: Hayes, Unseld 13 each Asts: Archie Clark 10
New York leads series, 3–1

Baltimore Civic Center, Baltimore, Maryland
Attendance: 12,289

Last Playoff Game played at The Baltimore Civic Center.

April 8

Boxscore

Baltimore Bullets 99, New York Knicks 109
Scoring by quarter: 31–26, 14–28, 31–24, 23–31
Pts: Archie Clark 30; Rebs: Wes Unseld 21; Asts: Chenier, Unseld 4 each	Pts: Earl Monroe 26; Rebs: Dave DeBusschere 15; Asts: Walt Frazier 7
New York wins series, 4–1

Madison Square Garden, New York City, New York
Attendance: 19,694

This was the fifth playoff meeting between these two teams, with the Knicks winning three of the previous four meetings.

Previous playoff series
New York leads 3–1 in all-time playoff series

1969

Baltimore Bullets 0, New York Knicks 4

1969 Eastern Division Semifinals

1970

Baltimore Bullets 3, New York Knicks 4

1970 Eastern Division Semifinals

1971

Baltimore Bullets 4, New York Knicks 3

1971 Eastern Conference Finals

1972

Baltimore Bullets 2, New York Knicks 4

1972 Eastern Conference Semifinals

=== Western Conference semifinals ===
==== (1) Milwaukee Bucks vs. (4) Golden State Warriors ====
March 30

Boxscore

Golden State Warriors 90, Milwaukee Bucks 110
Scoring by quarter: 16–23, 22–25, 23–28, 29–34
Pts: Rick Barry 22; Rebs: Clyde Lee 10; Asts: Jim Barnett 6	Pts: Abdul-Jabbar, Robertson 22 each Rebs: Kareem Abdul-Jabbar 24; Asts: Oscar Robertson 12
Milwaukee leads series, 1–0

Milwaukee Arena, Milwaukee, Wisconsin
Attendance: 10,746

April 1

Boxscore

Golden State Warriors 95, Milwaukee Bucks 92
Scoring by quarter: 27–20, 20–21, 29–24, 19–27
Pts: Cazzie Russell 25; Rebs: Clyde Lee 17; Asts: Walt Hazzard 7	Pts: Kareem Abdul-Jabbar 26; Rebs: Kareem Abdul-Jabbar 15; Asts: five players 3 each
Series tied, 1–1

Milwaukee Arena, Milwaukee, Wisconsin
Attendance: 10,379

April 5

Boxscore

Milwaukee Bucks 113, Golden State Warriors 93
Scoring by quarter: 21–18, 26–20, 37–23, 29–32
Pts: Oscar Robertson 34; Rebs: Kareem Abdul-Jabbar 18; Asts: Oscar Robertson 8	Pts: Jeff Mullins 21; Rebs: Clyde Lee 17; Asts: Jeff Mullins 4
Milwaukee leads series, 2–1

Oakland–Alameda County Coliseum Arena, Oakland, California
Attendance: 8,493

April 7

Boxscore

Milwaukee Bucks 97, Golden State Warriors 102
Scoring by quarter: 26–28, 19–26, 26–27, 26–21
Pts: Kareem Abdul-Jabbar 25; Rebs: Perry, Abdul-Jabbar 14 each Asts: Oscar Robertson 7	Pts: Rick Barry 38; Rebs: Clyde Lee 21; Asts: Jeff Mullins 6
Series tied, 2–2

Oakland–Alameda County Coliseum Arena, Oakland, California
Attendance: 8,173

April 10

Boxscore

Golden State Warriors 100, Milwaukee Bucks 97
Scoring by quarter: 29–18, 28–28, 25–27, 18–24
Pts: Clyde Lee 21; Rebs: Clyde Lee 18; Asts: Walt Hazzard 5	Pts: four players 19 each Rebs: Perry, Abdul-Jabbar 12 each Asts: Oscar Robertson 11
Golden State leads series, 3–2

University of Wisconsin Field House, Madison, Wisconsin
Attendance: 12,204

April 13

Boxscore

Milwaukee Bucks 86, Golden State Warriors 100
Scoring by quarter: 17–26, 26–28, 23–22, 20–24
Pts: Kareem Abdul-Jabbar 27; Rebs: Kareem Abdul-Jabbar 14; Asts: Lucius Allen 5	Pts: Jim Barnett 26; Rebs: Clyde Lee 19; Asts: Jim Barnett 7
Golden State wins series, 4–2

Oakland–Alameda County Coliseum Arena, Oakland, California
Attendance: 13,175

This was the third playoff meeting between these two teams, with the Bucks winning the first two meetings.

Previous playoff series
Milwaukee leads 2–0 in all-time playoff series

1971

San Francisco Warriors 1, Milwaukee Bucks 4

1971 Western Conference Semifinals

1972

Golden State Warriors 1, Milwaukee Bucks 4

1972 Western Conference Semifinals

==== (2) Los Angeles Lakers vs. (3) Chicago Bulls ====
March 30

Boxscore

Chicago Bulls 104, Los Angeles Lakers 107 (OT)
Scoring by quarter: 21–21, 29–20, 19–30, 25–23, Overtime: 10–13
Pts: Bob Love 21; Rebs: Dennis Awtrey 15; Asts: Dennis Awtrey 6	Pts: Gail Goodrich 28; Rebs: Wilt Chamberlain 20; Asts: Jerry West 9
Los Angeles leads series, 1–0

The Forum, Inglewood, California
Attendance: 16,341

April 1

Boxscore

Chicago Bulls 93, Los Angeles Lakers 108
Scoring by quarter: 28–21, 19–35, 24–24, 22–28
Pts: Bob Love 32; Rebs: Chet Walker 11; Asts: Tom Boerwinkle 9	Pts: Gail Goodrich 33; Rebs: Wilt Chamberlain 21; Asts: Jerry West 19
Los Angeles leads series, 2–0

The Forum, Inglewood, California
Attendance: 17,368

April 6

Boxscore

Los Angeles Lakers 86, Chicago Bulls 96
Scoring by quarter: 19–31, 28–21, 22–22, 17–22
Pts: Jim McMillian 24; Rebs: Wilt Chamberlain 18; Asts: Jerry West 13	Pts: Chet Walker 30; Rebs: Dennis Awtrey 14; Asts: Norm Van Lier 8
Los Angeles leads series, 2–1

Chicago Stadium, Chicago, Illinois
Attendance: 14,606

April 8

Boxscore

Los Angeles Lakers 94, Chicago Bulls 98
Scoring by quarter: 21–21, 31–29, 24–23, 18–25
Pts: Jim McMillian 25; Rebs: Wilt Chamberlain 30; Asts: Goodrich, West 5 each	Pts: Bob Love 38; Rebs: Bob Love 13; Asts: Bob Love 6
Series tied, 2–2

Chicago Stadium, Chicago, Illinois
Attendance: 14,181

April 10

Boxscore

Chicago Bulls 102, Los Angeles Lakers 123
Scoring by quarter: 18–26, 34–34, 31–29, 19–34
Pts: Bob Love 27; Rebs: Bob Love 14; Asts: Awtrey, Van Lier 5 each	Pts: Jerry West 36; Rebs: Wilt Chamberlain 29; Asts: Jerry West 11
Los Angeles leads series, 3–2

The Forum, Inglewood, California
Attendance: 17,505

April 13

Boxscore

Los Angeles Lakers 93, Chicago Bulls 101
Scoring by quarter: 21–26, 27–25, 18–26, 27–24
Pts: Jerry West 19; Rebs: Wilt Chamberlain 26; Asts: Jerry West 5	Pts: Jerry Sloan 27; Rebs: Dennis Awtrey 14; Asts: Dennis Awtrey 8
Series tied, 3–3

Chicago Stadium, Chicago, Illinois
Attendance: 18,096

April 15

Boxscore

Chicago Bulls 92, Los Angeles Lakers 95
Scoring by quarter: 22–22, 28–24, 28–26, 14–23
Pts: Norm Van Lier 28; Rebs: Norm Van Lier 14; Asts: Bob Love 5	Pts: Jerry West 27; Rebs: Wilt Chamberlain 28; Asts: Jerry West 7
Los Angeles wins series, 4–3

The Forum, Inglewood, California
Attendance: 17,505

This was the fourth playoff meeting between these two teams, with the Lakers winning the first three meetings.

Previous playoff series
Los Angeles leads 3–0 in all-time playoff series

1968

Chicago Bulls 1, Los Angeles Lakers 4

1968 Western Division Semifinals

1971

Chicago Bulls 3, Los Angeles Lakers 4

1971 Western Conference Semifinals

1972

Chicago Bulls 0, Los Angeles Lakers 4

1972 Western Conference Semifinals

== Conference finals ==
=== Eastern Conference finals ===
==== (1) Boston Celtics vs. (2) New York Knicks ====
April 15

Boxscore

New York Knicks 108, Boston Celtics 134
Scoring by quarter: 30–34, 26–33, 27–34, 25–33
Pts: Walt Frazier 24; Rebs: Walt Frazier 7 Asts: Walt Frazier 10	Pts: Jo Jo White 30; Rebs: Dave Cowens 15; Asts: John Havlicek 11
Boston leads series, 1–0

Boston Garden, Boston, Massachusetts
Attendance: 15,320

April 18

Boxscore

Boston Celtics 96, New York Knicks 129
Scoring by quarter: 18–29, 24–31, 19–32, 35–37
Pts: John Havlicek 21; Rebs: Dave Cowens 13; Asts: John Havlicek 11	Pts: Walt Frazier 24; Rebs: Dave DeBusschere 8 Asts: Walt Frazier 10
Series tied, 1–1

Madison Square Garden, New York City, New York
Attendance: 19,694

April 20

Boxscore

New York Knicks 98, Boston Celtics 91
Scoring by quarter: 29–27, 29–19, 23–31, 17–14
Pts: Walt Frazier 23; Rebs: DeBusschere, Reed 11 each Asts: Walt Frazier 5	Pts: John Havlicek 29; Rebs: Paul Silas 14; Asts: John Havlicek 6
New York leads series, 2–1

Boston Garden, Boston, Massachusetts
Attendance: 15,320

April 22

Boxscore

Boston Celtics 110, New York Knicks 117 (2OT)
Scoring by quarter: 20–25, 28–17, 24–14, 17–33, Overtime: 12–12, 9–16
Pts: Jo Jo White 34; Rebs: Paul Silas 23; Asts: Jo Jo White 6	Pts: Walt Frazier 37; Rebs: Dave DeBusschere 10; Asts: Dean Meminger 7
New York leads series, 3–1

Madison Square Garden, New York City, New York
Attendance: 19,694

April 25

Boxscore

New York Knicks 97, Boston Celtics 98
Scoring by quarter: 25–29, 27–29, 23–23, 22–17
Pts: Walt Frazier 21; Rebs: Dave DeBusschere 12; Asts: Frazier, DeBusschere 5 each	Pts: Dave Cowens 32; Rebs: Paul Silas 20; Asts: Jo Jo White 7
New York leads series, 3–2

Boston Garden, Boston, Massachusetts
Attendance: 15,320

April 27

Boxscore

Boston Celtics 110, New York Knicks 100
Scoring by quarter: 24–21, 29–34, 29–27, 28–18
Pts: Dave Cowens 26; Rebs: Dave Cowens 14; Asts: Jo Jo White 7	Pts: Walt Frazier 29; Rebs: Dave DeBusschere 17; Asts: Bradley, DeBusschere 5 each
Series tied, 3–3

Madison Square Garden, New York City, New York
Attendance: 19,694

April 29

Boxscore

New York Knicks 94, Boston Celtics 78
Scoring by quarter: 19–22, 26–18, 27–17, 22–21
Pts: Walt Frazier 25; Rebs: Walt Frazier 10; Asts: Dave DeBusschere 8	Pts: Dave Cowens 24; Rebs: Paul Silas 16; Asts: Dave Cowens 5
New York wins series, 4–3

Boston Garden, Boston, Massachusetts
Attendance: 15,320

- The Knicks became the 1st NBA road team to win Game 7 after leading series 3–1. This is also the first time the Celtics have lost a Game 7.

This was the ninth playoff meeting between these two teams, with both teams splitting the first eight meetings.

Previous playoff series
Tied 4–4 in all-time playoff series

1951

Boston Celtics 0, New York Knicks 2

1951 Eastern Division Semifinals

1952

Boston Celtics 1, New York Knicks 2

1952 Eastern Division Semifinals

1953

Boston Celtics 1, New York Knicks 3

1953 Eastern Division Finals

1954

Boston Celtics 2, New York Knicks 0

1954 Eastern Division Round Robin Semifinals

1955

Boston Celtics 2, New York Knicks 1

1955 Eastern Division Semifinals

1967

Boston Celtics 3, New York Knicks 1

1967 Eastern Division Semifinals

1969

Boston Celtics 4, New York Knicks 2

1969 Eastern Division Finals

1972

Boston Celtics 1, New York Knicks 4

1972 Eastern Conference Finals

=== Western Conference finals ===
==== (2) Los Angeles Lakers vs. (4) Golden State Warriors ====
April 17

Boxscore

Golden State Warriors 99, Los Angeles Lakers 101
Scoring by quarter: 23–27, 30–23, 22–25, 24–26
Pts: Nate Thurmond 22; Rebs: Nate Thurmond 26; Asts: Thurmond, Barnett 5 each	Pts: Jim McMillian 37; Rebs: Wilt Chamberlain 25; Asts: Jerry West 8
Los Angeles leads series, 1–0

The Forum, Inglewood, California
Attendance: 17,505

April 19

Boxscore

Golden State Warriors 93, Los Angeles Lakers 104
Scoring by quarter: 30–28, 20–18, 27–31, 16–27
Pts: Rick Barry 29; Rebs: Clyde Lee 18; Asts: Nate Thurmond 6	Pts: Jerry West 36; Rebs: Wilt Chamberlain 30; Asts: Jerry West 6
Los Angeles leads series, 2–0

The Forum, Inglewood, California
Attendance: 17,505

April 21

Boxscore

Los Angeles Lakers 126, Golden State Warriors 70
Scoring by quarter: 26–14, 27–20, 36–16, 37–20
Pts: Jim McMillian 28; Rebs: Wilt Chamberlain 25; Asts: Jerry West 11	Pts: Rick Barry 10; Rebs: Clyde Lee 18; Asts: six players 2 each
Los Angeles leads series, 3–0

Oakland–Alameda County Coliseum Arena, Oakland, California
Attendance: 13,183

April 23

Boxscore

Los Angeles Lakers 109, Golden State Warriors 117
Scoring by quarter: 21–31, 26–20, 36–33, 26–33
Pts: Jerry West 32; Rebs: Wilt Chamberlain 16; Asts: Gail Goodrich 7	Pts: Cazzie Russell 33; Rebs: Nate Thurmond 18; Asts: Jeff Mullins 7
Los Angeles leads series, 3–1

Oakland–Alameda County Coliseum Arena, Oakland, California
Attendance: 8,000

April 25

Boxscore

Golden State Warriors 118, Los Angeles Lakers 128
Scoring by quarter: 30–26, 20–32, 33–42, 35–28
Pts: Cazzie Russell 29; Rebs: Nate Thurmond 15; Asts: Thurmond, Mullins 5 each	Pts: Gail Goodrich 44; Rebs: Wilt Chamberlain 22; Asts: Jerry West 9
Los Angeles wins series, 4–1

The Forum, Inglewood, California
Attendance: 17,505

This was the fourth playoff meeting between these two teams, with the Lakers winning two of the first three meetings.

Previous playoff series
Los Angeles leads 2–1 in all-time playoff series

1967

Los Angeles Lakers 0, San Francisco Warriors 3

1967 Western Division Semifinals

1968

Los Angeles Lakers 4, San Francisco Warriors 0

1968 Western Division Finals

1969

Los Angeles Lakers 4, San Francisco Warriors 2

1969 Western Division Semifinals

== NBA Finals: (W2) Los Angeles Lakers vs. (E2) New York Knicks ==
May 1

Boxscore

New York Knicks 112, Los Angeles Lakers 115
Scoring by quarter: 26–29, 23–30, 30–36, 33–20
Pts: Dave DeBusschere 25; Rebs: Dave DeBusschere 16; Asts: Walt Frazier 8	Pts: Gail Goodrich 30; Rebs: Wilt Chamberlain 20; Asts: Wilt Chamberlain 6
Los Angeles leads series, 1–0

The Forum, Inglewood, California
Attendance: 17,505
Referees: Mendy Rudolph, Jack Madden

May 3

Boxscore

New York Knicks 99, Los Angeles Lakers 95
Scoring by quarter: 24–23, 26–23, 26–26, 23–23
Pts: Bill Bradley 26; Rebs: DeBusschere, Reed 9 each Asts: Bill Bradley 4	Pts: Jerry West 32; Rebs: Wilt Chamberlain 20; Asts: West, Goodrich 5 each
Series tied, 1–1

The Forum, Inglewood, California
Attendance: 17,505
Referees: Jake O'Donnell, Ed Rush

May 6

Boxscore

Los Angeles Lakers 83, New York Knicks 87
Scoring by quarter: 24–26, 23–18, 13–25, 23–18
Pts: Jim McMillian 22; Rebs: Wilt Chamberlain 13; Asts: Wilt Chamberlain 5	Pts: Willis Reed 22; Rebs: Dave DeBusschere 11; Asts: Earl Monroe 6
New York leads series, 2–1

Madison Square Garden, New York City, New York
Attendance: 19,694
Referees: Jack Madden, Don Murphy

May 8

Boxscore

Los Angeles Lakers 98, New York Knicks 103
Scoring by quarter: 16–29, 28–26, 25–27, 29–21
Pts: West, Goodrich 23 each Rebs: Wilt Chamberlain 19; Asts: Bill Bridges 7	Pts: Dave DeBusschere 33; Rebs: Dave DeBusschere 14; Asts: Walt Frazier 8
New York leads series, 3–1

Madison Square Garden, New York City, New York
Attendance: 19,694
Referees: Mendy Rudolph, Darell Garretson

May 10

Boxscore

New York Knicks 102, Los Angeles Lakers 93
Scoring by quarter: 23–16, 16–25, 32–18, 31–34
Pts: Earl Monroe 23; Rebs: Willis Reed 12; Asts: Frazier, Bradley 5 each	Pts: Gail Goodrich 28; Rebs: Wilt Chamberlain 21; Asts: Jerry West 4
New York wins series, 4–1

The Forum, Inglewood, California
Attendance: 17,505
Referees: Don Murphy, Darell Garretson

- Wilt Chamberlain's final NBA game.

This was the fifth playoff meeting between these two teams, with the Lakers winning three of the first four meetings.

Previous playoff series
Los Angeles leads 3–1 in all-time playoff series

1952

Minneapolis Lakers 4, New York Knicks 3

1952 NBA Finals

1953

Minneapolis Lakers 4, New York Knicks 1

1953 NBA Finals

1970

Los Angeles Lakers 3, New York Knicks 4

1970 NBA Finals

1972

Los Angeles Lakers 4, New York Knicks 1

1972 NBA Finals

== See also ==
- 1973 NBA Finals
- 1972–73 NBA season
