= Lloyd Neal =

American basketball player (born 1950)

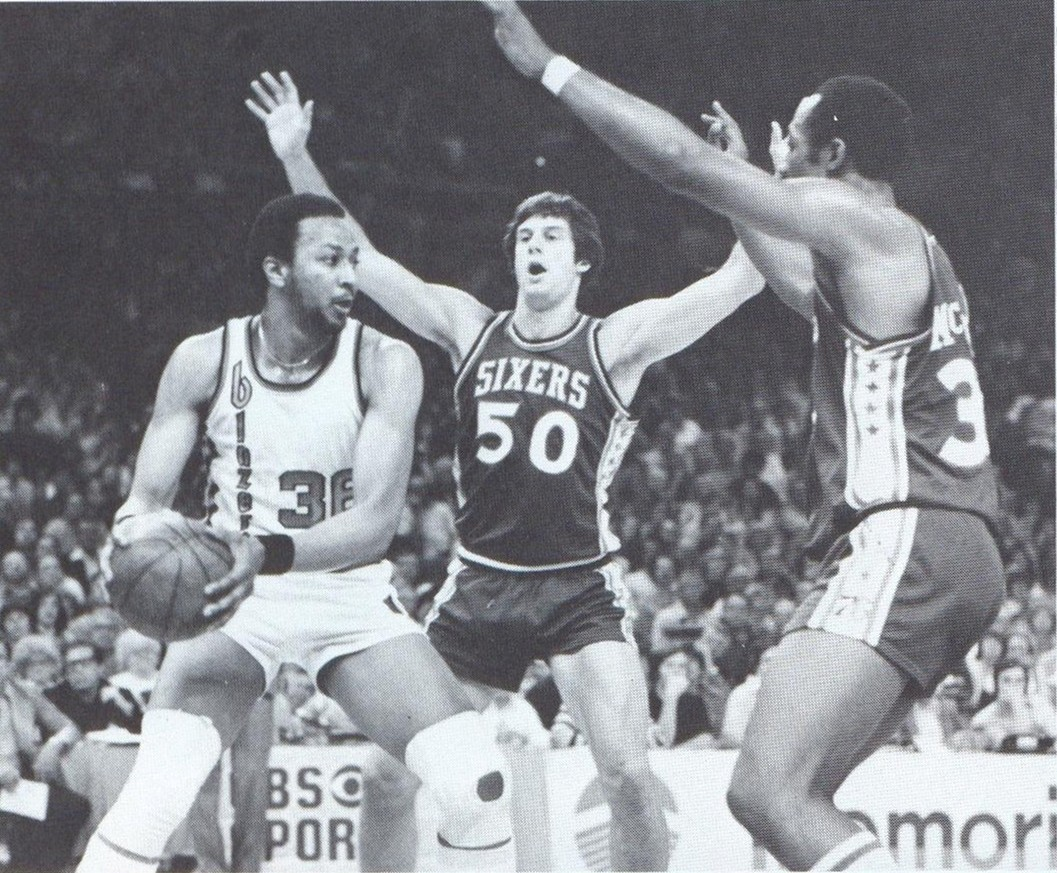
- Neal (left) in 1977

Personal information
- Born: December 10, 1950 (age 75) Talbotton, Georgia, U.S.
- Listed height: 6 ft 7 in (2.01 m)
- Listed weight: 225 lb (102 kg)

Career information
- High school: Talbotton (Talbotton, Georgia)
- College: Tennessee State (1968–1972)
- NBA draft: 1972: 3rd round, 31st overall pick
- Drafted by: Portland Trail Blazers
- Playing career: 1972–1979
- Position: Center / power forward
- Number: 36

Career history
- 1972–1979: Portland Trail Blazers

Career highlights
- NBA champion (1977); NBA All-Rookie First Team (1973); No. 36 retired by Portland Trail Blazers

Career statistics
- Points: 4,846 (11.1 ppg)
- Rebounds: 3,370 (7.7 rpg)
- Assists: 632 (1.5 apg)
- Stats at NBA.com
- Stats at Basketball Reference

Lloyd Neal (born December 10, 1950) is an American former professional basketball player born in Talbotton, Georgia.

A 6'7" center/power forward from Tennessee State University, Neal spent his entire professional career (1972–1979) with the National Basketball Association's Portland Trail Blazers. Though undersized for his position, he endeared himself to fans with his hard work and tenacity, and he averaged a double-double (13.4 points, 11.8 rebounds) during the 1972–73 NBA season. After his career was cut short by a knee injury in 1979, the Blazers retired his #36 jersey. He finished college in 1980 and moved on to a long career with the Internal Revenue Service in Portland before retiring.

== Career statistics ==
=== NBA statistics ===
Legend
GP	Games played	GS	Games started	MPG	Minutes per game
FG%	Field goal percentage	3P%	3-point field goal percentage	FT%	Free throw percentage
RPG	Rebounds per game	APG	Assists per game	SPG	Steals per game
BPG	Blocks per game	PPG	Points per game	**Bold**	Career high
†	Won an NBA championship	*	Led the league

=== Regular season ===
Year	Team	GP	GS	MPG	FG%	3P%	FT%	RPG	APG	SPG	BPG	PPG
1972–73	Portland	**82***	—	33.2	.494	—	.638	**11.8**	**1.8**	—	—	13.4
1973–74	Portland	80	—	19.0	.490	—	.696	6.2	1.1	.6	.9	7.6
1974–75	Portland	**82**	—	27.8	.471	—	.641	8.4	1.7	.5	1.1	12.3
1975–76	Portland	68	—	**34.1**	.481	—	.694	8.6	1.7	**.8**	**1.6**	**15.5**
1976–77†	Portland	58	—	16.5	.471	—	.675	4.4	1.0	.1	.6	6.8
1977–78	Portland	61	—	19.2	**.504**	—	.718	6.1	1.3	.5	.3	11.0
1978–79	Portland	4	—	12.0	.364	—	**1.000**	2.3	.3	.0	.3	2.3
Career		435	—	25.3	.485	—	.672	7.7	1.5	.5	.9	11.1

=== Post season ===
Year	Team	GP	GS	MPG	FG%	3P%	FT%	RPG	APG	SPG	BPG	PPG
1977†	Portland	**19***	—	10.8	**.476**	—	.654	**3.7**	**.9**	**.1**	.4	4.1
1978	Portland	3	—	**15.7**	.333	—	**1.000**	**3.7**	.7	.0	**1.3**	**5.0**
Career		22	—	11.5	.440	—	.667	3.7	.9	.1	.5	4.2
