= 1972–73 Portland Trail Blazers season =

NBA professional basketball team season

- Head coach: Jack McCloskey
- General manager: Harry Glickman
- Owners: Herman Sarkowsky; Larry Weinberg
- Arena: Memorial Coliseum

Results
- Record: 21–61 (.256)
- Place: Division: 5th (Pacific); Conference: 9th (Western)
- Playoff finish: Did not qualify
- Stats at Basketball Reference

Local media
- Television: KPTV
- Radio: KOIN

The 1972–73 Portland Trail Blazers season was the third season of the Portland Trail Blazers in the National Basketball Association (NBA). After finishing the previous season at 18–64, the Blazers earned the first overall selection in the 1972 NBA draft. Bob McAdoo was the consensus number one pick but the two sides could not agree on a contract prior to the draft. Rather than risking losing McAdoo to the American Basketball Association (ABA) and getting nothing for the number one pick, the Blazers opted to select LaRue Martin. LaRue would average seven points per game over a four-season NBA career. The Blazers finished at 21–61, a marginal three-game improvement from the previous season.

== Draft picks ==
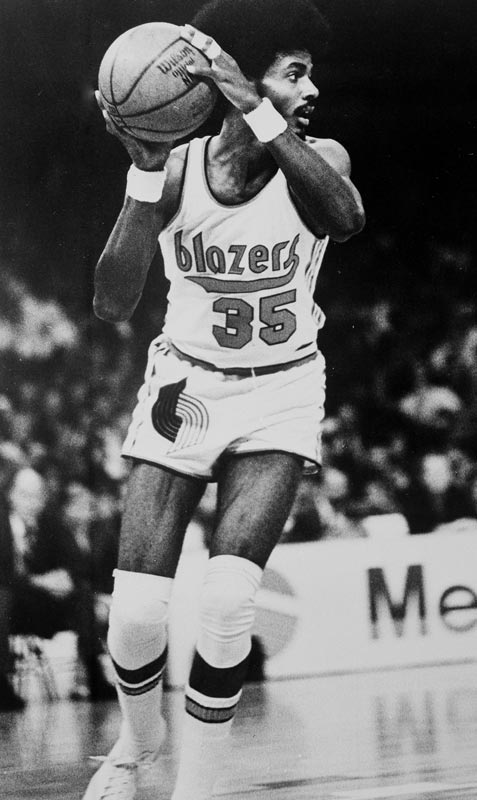
LaRue Martin was the Trail Blazers first overall pick.

Note: This is not a complete list; only the first two rounds are covered, as well as any other picks by the franchise who played at least one NBA game.

Round	Pick	Player	Position	Nationality	School/Club team
1	1	LaRue Martin	C	United States	Loyola (Illinois)
2	14	Bob Davis	F	United States	Weber State
2	26	Dave Twardzik	G	United States	Old Dominion
2	30	Ollie Johnson	F	United States	Temple
3	31	Lloyd Neal	F/C	United States	Tennessee State

== Roster ==
Portland Trail Blazers roster
Players

Pos.	No.	Player	Height	Weight	DOB	From
PG	12	Rick Adelman	6 ft 1 in (1.85 m)	175 lb (79 kg)		Loyola Marymount
SF	25	Bob Davis	6 ft 7 in (2.01 m)	215 lb (98 kg)		Weber State
SG	17	Charlie Davis	6 ft 2 in (1.88 m)	160 lb (73 kg)		Wake Forest
SF	42	Terry Dischinger	6 ft 7 in (2.01 m)	189 lb (86 kg)		Purdue
SF	44	Ollie Johnson	6 ft 6 in (1.98 m)	200 lb (91 kg)		Temple
C	35	LaRue Martin	6 ft 11 in (2.11 m)	208 lb (94 kg)		Loyola Chicago
C	36	Lloyd Neal	6 ft 7 in (2.01 m)	225 lb (102 kg)		Tennessee State
PF	45	Geoff Petrie	6 ft 7 in (2.01 m)	210 lb (95 kg)		Princeton
SF	4	Greg Smith	6 ft 5 in (1.96 m)	195 lb (88 kg)		Western Kentucky
C	43	William Smith	7 ft 0 in (2.13 m)	210 lb (95 kg)		Syracuse
SG	15	Larry Steele	6 ft 5 in (1.96 m)	190 lb (86 kg)		Kentucky
PF	34	Bill Turner	6 ft 7 in (2.01 m)	220 lb (100 kg)		Akron
PF	21	Sidney Wicks	6 ft 8 in (2.03 m)	225 lb (102 kg)		UCLA
PG	13	Dave Wohl	6 ft 2 in (1.88 m)	185 lb (84 kg)		Penn

Coaches
Head coach
- Jack McCloskey (Penn)
Assistant(s)
- Neil Johnston

Legend
- (DP) Unsigned draft pick
- (FA) Free agent
- (S) Suspended
- Injured

Roster

== Regular season ==
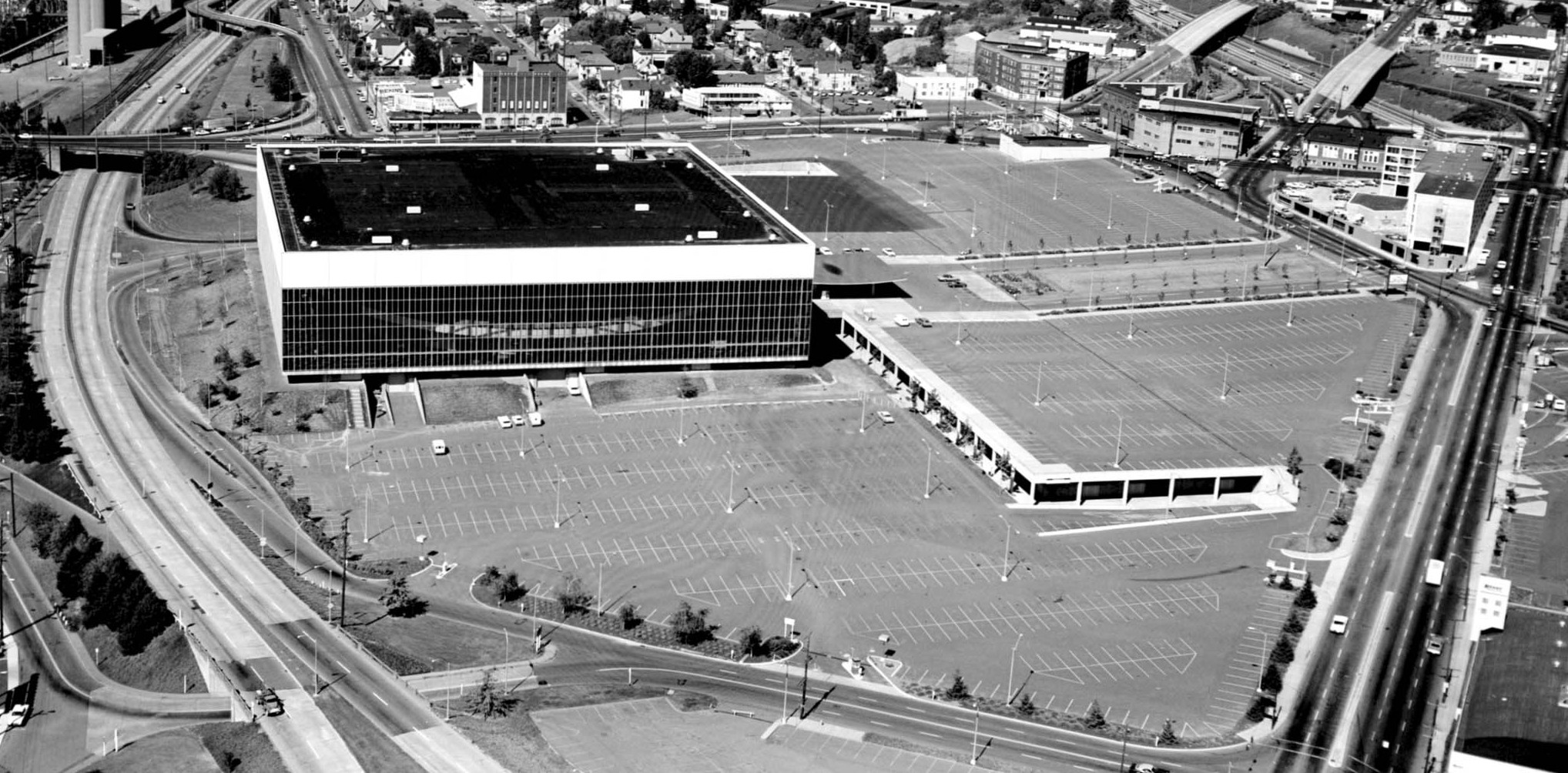
The Trail Blazers played their home games at Veterans Memorial Coliseum.

=== Season standings ===
Pacific Division	W	L	PCT	GB	Home	Road	Neutral	Div
y-Los Angeles Lakers	60	22	.732	–	30–11	28–11	2–0	22–4
x-Golden State Warriors	47	35	.573	13	27–14	18–20	2–1	14–12
Phoenix Suns	38	44	.463	22	22–19	15–25	1–0	14–12
Seattle SuperSonics	26	56	.317	34	16–25	10–29	0–2	9–17
Portland Trail Blazers	21	61	.256	39	13–28	8–32	0–1	6–20

#	Western Conference			
#	Team	W	L	PCT
1	z-Milwaukee Bucks	60	22	.732
2	y-Los Angeles Lakers	60	22	.732
3	x-Chicago Bulls	51	31	.622
4	x-Golden State Warriors	47	35	.573
5	Detroit Pistons	40	42	.488
6	Phoenix Suns	38	44	.463
7	Kansas City–Omaha Kings	36	46	.439
8	Seattle SuperSonics	26	56	.317
9	Portland Trail Blazers	21	61	.256

z – clinched division title
y – clinched division title
x – clinched playoff spot

=== Game log ===
1972–73 Game log
#	Date	Opponent	Score	High points	Record
1	October 13	Seattle	92–84	Sidney Wicks (26)	0–1
2	October 14	Phoenix	124–120	Geoff Petrie (30)	0–2
3	October 17	Milwaukee	108–111	Sidney Wicks (33)	1–2
4	October 20	@ Los Angeles	104–126	Adelman, Dischinger (16)	1–3
5	October 21	Golden State	104–97	Sidney Wicks (28)	1–4
6	October 22	@ Seattle	119–120 (OT)	Geoff Petrie (29)	1–5
7	October 24	Atlanta	118–110	Sidney Wicks (31)	1–6
8	October 27	Chicago	118–95	Geoff Petrie (30)	1–7
9	October 29	Detroit	119–111	Sidney Wicks (31)	1–8
10	November 2	@ Golden State	104–118	Sidney Wicks (30)	1–9
11	November 4	Los Angeles	134–120	Petrie, Wicks (26)	1–10
12	November 6	New York	111–95	Sidney Wicks (21)	1–11
13	November 12	Kansas City–Omaha	100–102	Lloyd Neal (29)	1–12
14	November 14	Cleveland	91–100	Sidney Wicks (27)	3–11
15	November 17	Golden State	97–105	Petrie, Wicks (25)	4–11
16	November 18	Seattle	102–100	Sidney Wicks (27)	4–12
17	November 21	@ New York	80–108	Ollie Johnson (17)	4–13
18	November 22	@ Boston	107–126	Sidney Wicks (23)	4–14
19	November 25	@ Philadelphia	117–106	Sidney Wicks (30)	5–14
20	November 26	@ Cleveland	105–102	Geoff Petrie (27)	6–14
21	November 28	@ Detroit	116–120	Geoff Petrie (39)	6–15
22	November 29	@ Kansas City–Omaha	102–110	Geoff Petrie (23)	6–16
23	December 2	Atlanta	106–103	Geoff Petrie (30)	6–17
24	December 5	@ Atlanta	121–122	Geoff Petrie (39)	6–18
25	December 6	@ Baltimore	102–115	Geoff Petrie (36)	6–19
26	December 8	@ Houston	108–114	Geoff Petrie (34)	6–20
27	December 9	@ Phoenix	97–116	Charlie Davis (20)	6–21
28	December 10	@ Los Angeles	101–137	Geoff Petrie (18)	6–22
29	December 12	Milwaukee	115–94	Charlie Davis (17)	6–23
30	December 15	@ Seattle	96–95	Geoff Petrie (29)	7–23
31	December 16	Boston	123–116	Geoff Petrie (38)	7–24
32	December 18	@ Kansas City–Omaha	95–113	Sidney Wicks (23)	7–25
33	December 19	@ Chicago	109–100	Sidney Wicks (31)	8–25
34	December 20	@ Milwaukee	104–123	Sidney Wicks (32)	8–26
35	December 22	Chicago	127–97	Geoff Petrie (24)	8–27
36	December 25	Seattle	113–116	Sidney Wicks (38)	9–27
37	December 26	@ Los Angeles	92–116	Sidney Wicks (17)	9–28
38	December 29	@ Phoenix	99–106	Sidney Wicks (32)	9–29
39	December 30	Phoenix	107–104	Sidney Wicks (33)	9–30
40	January 2	Kansas City–Omaha	87–104	Sidney Wicks (23)	10–30
41	January 4	@ Golden State	83–108	Sidney Wicks (22)	10–31
42	January 5	Philadelphia	102–135	Geoff Petrie (29)	11–31
43	January 7	Detroit	101–96	Geoff Petrie (35)	11–32
44	January 9	Baltimore	105–93	Geoff Petrie (30)	11–33
45	January 12	@ Buffalo	100–120	Sidney Wicks (25)	11–34
46	January 15	@ Detroit	101–112	Sidney Wicks (29)	11–35
47	January 16	@ Chicago	89–100	Geoff Petrie (21)	11–36
48	January 17	@ Boston	99–117	Geoff Petrie (20)	11–37
49	January 19	@ Milwaukee	105–108	Sidney Wicks (31)	11–38
50	January 20	@ Houston	130–115	Geoff Petrie (51)	12–38
51	January 26	Phoenix	120–116	Sidney Wicks (33)	12–39
52	January 27	@ Phoenix	117–109	Geoff Petrie (33)	13–39
53	January 30	Houston	123–120	Sidney Wicks (28)	13–40
54	February 3	Kansas City–Omaha	105–97	Sidney Wicks (26)	13–41
55	February 6	Seattle	118–117	Sidney Wicks (31)	13–42
56	February 8	@ Golden State	111–123	Geoff Petrie (42)	13–43
57	February 9	Philadelphia	105–116	Lloyd Neal (33)	14–43
58	February 11	Baltimore	102–97	Geoff Petrie (30)	14–44
59	February 13	Buffalo	100–120	Geoff Petrie (25)	15–44
60	February 16	Boston	112–105	Geoff Petrie (31)	15–45
61	February 17	Los Angeles	110–103	Geoff Petrie (27)	15–46
62	February 18	@ Phoenix	119–118	Geoff Petrie (23)	16–46
63	February 20	@ New York	106–110	Sidney Wicks (31)	16–47
64	February 23	@ Cleveland	102–121	Geoff Petrie (22)	16–48
65	February 24	@ Baltimore	110–128	Sidney Wicks (25)	16–49
66	February 25	N Philadelphia	111–115	Sidney Wicks (30)	16–50
67	February 27	Chicago	125–110	Geoff Petrie (26)	16–51
68	March 2	Cleveland	92–106	Sidney Wicks (29)	17–51
69	March 4	Detroit	113–109	Neal, Petrie (24)	17–52
70	March 6	Los Angeles	114–102	Sidney Wicks (26)	17–53
71	March 8	@ Atlanta	129–135	Geoff Petrie (22)	17–54
72	March 9	@ Milwaukee	96–116	Steele, Wicks (14)	17–55
73	March 10	@ Buffalo	101–106	Sidney Wicks (33)	17–56
74	March 13	Golden State	109–101	Geoff Petrie (33)	17–57
75	March 16	Houston	128–141	Geoff Petrie (51)	18–57
76	March 18	New York	96–99	Geoff Petrie (34)	19–57
77	March 19	@ Kansas City–Omaha	105–106	Sidney Wicks (26)	19–58
78	March 20	@ Chicago	109–123	Geoff Petrie (32)	19–59
79	March 21	@ Detroit	109–122	Sidney Wicks (27)	19–60
80	March 23	@ Seattle	118–112	Geoff Petrie (41)	20–60
81	March 25	Buffalo	107–113 (OT)	Geoff Petrie (39)	21–60
82	March 26	Milwaukee	118–99	Geoff Petrie (29)	21–61

== Player statistics ==
Legend
GP	Games played	GS	Games started	MPG	Minutes per game
FG%	Field-goal percentage	3P%	3-point field-goal percentage	FT%	Free-throw percentage
RPG	Rebounds per game	APG	Assists per game	SPG	Steals per game
BPG	Blocks per game	PPG	Points per game

Player	GP	GS	MPG	FG%	3FG%	FT%	RPG	APG	SPG	BPG	PPG

== Awards and honors ==
- Sidney Wicks, NBA All-Star
- Lloyd Neal, NBA All-Rookie Team 1st Team

== Transactions ==
- July 31, 1972 – Traded a second round pick in the 1973 NBA draft to the Philadelphia 76ers in exchange for forward Fred Foster, who was traded again that day by the Trail Blazers to the Detroit Pistons in exchange for guard-forward Terry Dischinger.
- September 11, 1972 – Waived forwards Ron Knight and Jim Marsh and received a second round pick in the 1974 NBA Draft from the Philadelphia 76ers as compensation for signing veteran free agent forward Gary Gregor.
- September 19, 1972 – Waived guard Charlie Yelverton
- October 2, 1972 – Traded center Dale Schlueter to the Philadelphia 76ers in exchange for guard Dave Wohl.
- October 10, 1972 – Claimed forward Bill Turner off waivers from the Golden State Warriors.
- October 24, 1972 – Traded a third round pick in the 1974 NBA draft to the Cleveland Cavaliers in exchange for guard Charlie Davis.
- October 27, 1972 – Traded guard-forward Stan McKenzie (basketball) to the Houston Rockets in exchange for guard-forward Greg Smith
- November 13, 1972 – Waived forward Bill Turner
- December 6, 1972 – Waived guard Dave Wohl, who was claimed by the Buffalo Braves
- April 24, 1973 – Traded a first round and third round pick in the 1973 NBA Draft to the Cleveland Cavaliers in exchange for forward John Johnson and forward-center Rick Roberson and a first-round pick in the 1973 NBA Draft.
- June 21, 1973 – Guard-forward Terry Dischinger retired
- June 27, 1973 – Signed free agent guard Bernie Fryer

Transactions from Sports Reference
