= 1972–73 Golden State Warriors season =

NBA professional basketball team season

- Head coach: Al Attles
- Arena: Oakland-Alameda County Coliseum Arena

Results
- Record: 47–35 (.573)
- Place: Division: 2nd (Pacific); Conference: 4th (Western)
- Playoff finish: West Conference Finals (eliminated 1–4)
- Stats at Basketball Reference

The 1972–73 Golden State Warriors season was the Warriors' 27th season in the NBA and 11th in the San Francisco Bay Area.

== Offseason ==
=== Draft picks ===
Round	Pick	Player	Position	Nationality	College
3	43	Bill Chamberlain	F	United States	North Carolina
4	60	John Tschogl	F	United States	UC Santa Barbara
5	76	Charles Dudley	G	United States	Washington
6	93	Henry Bacon	G	United States	Louisville
7	110	William Franklin	F	United States	Purdue
8	126	John Burks		United States	San Francisco
9	141	Bill Duey		United States	California

== Roster ==
Golden State Warriors roster
Players

Pos.	No.	Player	Height	Weight	DOB	From
G	25	Jim Barnett	6 ft 4 in (1.93 m)	170 lb (77 kg)		Oregon
SF	24	Rick Barry	6 ft 7 in (2.01 m)	205 lb (93 kg)		Miami (FL)
F	31	Joe Ellis	6 ft 6 in (1.98 m)	175 lb (79 kg)		San Francisco
G	10	Charles Johnson	6 ft 0 in (1.83 m)	170 lb (77 kg)		California
C	52	George Johnson	6 ft 11 in (2.11 m)	205 lb (93 kg)		Dillard
F/C	43	Clyde Lee	6 ft 10 in (2.08 m)	205 lb (93 kg)		Vanderbilt
SG	23	Jeff Mullins	6 ft 4 in (1.93 m)	190 lb (86 kg)		Duke
G/F	33	Bob Portman	6 ft 5 in (1.96 m)	200 lb (91 kg)		Creighton
SF	32	Cazzie Russell	6 ft 5 in (1.96 m)	218 lb (99 kg)		Michigan
F/C	42	Nate Thurmond	6 ft 11 in (2.11 m)	225 lb (102 kg)		Bowling Green
PG	21	Ron Williams	6 ft 3 in (1.91 m)	188 lb (85 kg)		West Virginia

Coaches
Head coach
- Al Attles (North Carolina A&T)

Legend
- (DP) Unsigned draft pick
- (FA) Free agent
- (S) Suspended
- Injured

== Regular season ==
=== Season standings ===
Pacific Division	W	L	PCT	GB	Home	Road	Neutral	Div
y-Los Angeles Lakers	60	22	.732	–	30–11	28–11	2–0	22–4
x-Golden State Warriors	47	35	.573	13	27–14	18–20	2–1	14–12
Phoenix Suns	38	44	.463	22	22–19	15–25	1–0	14–12
Seattle SuperSonics	26	56	.317	34	16–25	10–29	0–2	9–17
Portland Trail Blazers	21	61	.256	39	13–28	8–32	0–1	6–20

#	Western Conference			
#	Team	W	L	PCT
1	z-Milwaukee Bucks	60	22	.732
2	y-Los Angeles Lakers	60	22	.732
3	x-Chicago Bulls	51	31	.622
4	x-Golden State Warriors	47	35	.573
5	Detroit Pistons	40	42	.488
6	Phoenix Suns	38	44	.463
7	Kansas City–Omaha Kings	36	46	.439
8	Seattle SuperSonics	26	56	.317
9	Portland Trail Blazers	21	61	.256

z – clinched division title
y – clinched division title
x – clinched playoff spot

=== Game log ===
1972–73 Game log
#	Date	Opponent	Score	High points	Record
1	October 14	Milwaukee	81–77	Cazzie Russell (20)	0–1
2	October 16	Baltimore	96–97	Rick Barry (22)	1–1
3	October 20	@ Seattle	101–92	Jeff Mullins (28)	2–1
4	October 21	@ Portland	104–97	Jeff Mullins (23)	3–1
5	October 26	Chicago	94–93	Cazzie Russell (28)	3–2
6	October 27	@ Los Angeles	119–91	Jeff Mullins (28)	4–2
7	October 28	Atlanta	107–122	Cazzie Russell (34)	5–2
8	October 31	Detroit	104–112	Rick Barry (27)	6–2
9	November 2	Portland	104–118	Cazzie Russell (23)	7–2
10	November 4	New York	104–127	Rick Barry (26)	8–2
11	November 7	@ Buffalo	105–91	Jeff Mullins (22)	9–2
12	November 8	@ Boston	111–128	Rick Barry (34)	9–3
13	November 10	@ Detroit	96–121	Cazzie Russell (22)	9–4
14	November 11	@ New York	103–102 (OT)	Rick Barry (27)	10–4
15	November 14	@ Atlanta	114–105	Nate Thurmond (33)	11–4
16	November 16	Philadelphia	106–128	Cazzie Russell (21)	12–4
17	November 17	@ Portland	97–105	Rick Barry (23)	12–5
18	November 18	Buffalo	92–120	Jeff Mullins (27)	13–5
19	November 22	@ Houston	104–132	Rick Barry (25)	13–6
20	November 24	@ Chicago	96–100	Jeff Mullins (22)	13–7
21	November 25	@ Kansas City–Omaha	133–114	Rick Barry (35)	14–7
22	November 28	Phoenix	102–110	Jim Barnett (23)	15–7
23	December 1	@ Phoenix	106–115	Nate Thurmond (32)	15–8
24	December 2	Los Angeles	112–103	Rick Barry (38)	15–9
25	December 5	Houston	101–108	Rick Barry (30)	16–9
26	December 8	@ Milwaukee	91–124	Rick Barry (26)	16–10
27	December 10	@ Cleveland	103–100	Rick Barry (36)	17–10
28	December 13	@ Detroit	110–107	Mullins, Russell (26)	18–10
29	December 15	@ Buffalo	129–95	Jeff Mullins (27)	19–10
30	December 16	N Baltimore	99–105	Rick Barry (24)	19–11
31	December 19	Boston	112–115	Nate Thurmond (33)	20–11
32	December 23	Chicago	109–127	Nate Thurmond (22)	21–11
33	December 26	Seattle	97–95	Nate Thurmond (25)	21–12
34	December 28	Cleveland	105–118	Rick Barry (35)	22–12
35	December 30	Kansas City–Omaha	107–113	Rick Barry (36)	23–12
36	January 2	Los Angeles	106–112	Rick Barry (30)	24–12
37	January 4	Portland	83–108	Rick Barry (30)	25–12
38	January 5	@ Seattle	128–96	Cazzie Russell (22)	26–12
39	January 6	Philadelphia	79–111	Ron Williams (20)	27–12
40	January 9	Detroit	98–105	Rick Barry (28)	28–12
41	January 11	@ Kansas City–Omaha	108–109	Nate Thurmond (27)	28–13
42	January 12	@ Phoenix	108–107	Jeff Mullins (25)	29–13
43	January 13	Phoenix	116–110	Nate Thurmond (23)	29–14
44	January 16	Cleveland	100–98	Cazzie Russell (24)	29–15
45	January 17	N Houston	117–123	Rick Barry (51)	30–15
46	January 19	@ Chicago	115–80	Jeff Mullins (24)	31–15
47	January 21	@ Milwaukee	108–124	Jeff Mullins (17)	31–16
48	January 25	Kansas City–Omaha	115–129	Rick Barry (30)	32–16
49	January 26	@ Los Angeles	84–100	Ellis, Russell (16)	32–17
50	January 27	Los Angeles	122–107	Jeff Mullins (30)	32–18
51	January 29	@ New York	84–97	Rick Barry (20)	32–19
52	January 30	@ Baltimore	86–104	Jeff Mullins (22)	32–20
53	January 31	@ Philadelphia	131–115	Rick Barry (31)	33–20
54	February 1	@ Kansas City–Omaha	96–98	Cazzie Russell (34)	33–21
55	February 3	Seattle	101–123	Cazzie Russell (32)	34–21
56	February 8	Portland	111–123	Nate Thurmond (39)	35–21
57	February 10	@ Milwaukee	108–135	Nate Thurmond (28)	35–22
58	February 11	@ Chicago	101–96	Nate Thurmond (26)	36–22
59	February 13	@ Cleveland	103–90	Rick Barry (36)	37–22
60	February 15	Baltimore	96–94	Jeff Mullins (30)	37–23
61	February 16	@ Seattle	108–114 (OT)	Barry, C. Johnson (24)	37–24
62	February 17	Boston	110–106	Nate Thurmond (29)	37–25
63	February 20	Atlanta	115–118	Rick Barry (31)	38–25
64	February 23	@ Los Angeles	111–106	Jeff Mullins (32)	39–25
65	February 24	Milwaukee	93–102	Rick Barry (25)	40–25
66	February 27	@ Detroit	100–114	Nate Thurmond (24)	40–26
67	February 28	@ Boston	111–118	Nate Thurmond (23)	40–27
68	March 2	Kansas City–Omaha	112–117	Cazzie Russell (37)	41–27
69	March 3	Chicago	117–116	Rick Barry (33)	41–28
70	March 6	Detroit	93–108	Jeff Mullins (24)	42–28
71	March 10	@ Atlanta	113–117	Jeff Mullins (28)	42–29
72	March 11	N Philadelphia	93–97	Rick Barry (25)	43–29
73	March 13	@ Portland	109–101	Rick Barry (34)	44–29
74	March 15	Houston	125–141	Jeff Mullins (26)	45–29
75	March 16	@ Seattle	106–116	Nate Thurmond (24)	45–30
76	March 17	New York	117–108	Barry, C. Johnson (24)	45–31
77	March 20	Seattle	106–114	Jeff Mullins (27)	46–31
78	March 22	Milwaukee	108–98	Cazzie Russell (23)	46–32
79	March 23	@ Phoenix	124–125	Rick Barry (22)	46–33
80	March 24	Buffalo	101–106	Rick Barry (26)	47–33
81	March 26	Phoenix	120–114	Rick Barry (32)	47–34
82	March 28	Los Angeles	96–89	Joe Ellis (17)	47–35

== Playoffs ==
1973 playoff game log
Conference Semi-finals: 4–2 (home: 2–1; road: 2–1)

Game	Date	Team	Score	High points	High rebounds	High assists	Location Attendance	Series
1	March 30	@ Milwaukee	L 90–110	Rick Barry (22)	Clyde Lee (10)	Jim Barnett (6)	Milwaukee Arena; 10,746	0–1
2	April 1	@ Milwaukee	W 95–92	Cazzie Russell (25)	Clyde Lee (17)	Walt Hazzard (7)	Milwaukee Arena; 10,379	1–1
3	April 5	Milwaukee	L 93–113	Jeff Mullins (21)	Clyde Lee (17)	Jeff Mullins (4)	Oakland–Alameda County Coliseum Arena; 8,493	1–2
4	April 7	Milwaukee	W 102–97	Rick Barry (38)	Clyde Lee (21)	Jeff Mullins (6)	Oakland–Alameda County Coliseum Arena; 8,173	2–2
5	April 10	@ Milwaukee	W 100–97	Clyde Lee (21)	Clyde Lee (18)	Walt Hazzard (5)	University of Wisconsin Field House; 12,204	3–2
6	April 13	Milwaukee	W 100–86	Jim Barnett (26)	Clyde Lee (19)	Jim Barnett (7)	Oakland–Alameda County Coliseum Arena; 13,175	4–2

Conference Finals: 1–4 (home: 1–1; road: 0–3)

Game	Date	Team	Score	High points	High rebounds	High assists	Location Attendance	Series
1	April 17	@ Los Angeles	L 99–101	Nate Thurmond (22)	Nate Thurmond (26)	Thurmond, Barnett (5)	The Forum; 17,505	0–1
2	April 19	@ Los Angeles	L 93–104	Rick Barry (29)	Clyde Lee (18)	Nate Thurmond (6)	The Forum; 17,505	0–2
3	April 21	Los Angeles	L 70–126	Rick Barry (10)	Clyde Lee (18)	six players tied (2)	Oakland–Alameda County Coliseum Arena; 13,183	0–3
4	April 23	Los Angeles	W 117–109	Cazzie Russell (33)	Nate Thurmond (18)	Jeff Mullins (7)	Oakland–Alameda County Coliseum Arena; 8,000	1–3
5	April 25	@ Los Angeles	L 118–128	Cazzie Russell (29)	Nate Thurmond (15)	Thurmond, Mullins (5)	The Forum; 17,505	1–4

1973 schedule

== Awards and records ==
- Nate Thurmond, NBA All-Star Game
- Rick Barry, NBA All-Star Game
- Rick Barry, All-NBA Second Team
- Nate Thurmond, NBA All-Defensive Second Team
