= Walt Frazier =

American basketball player (born 1945)

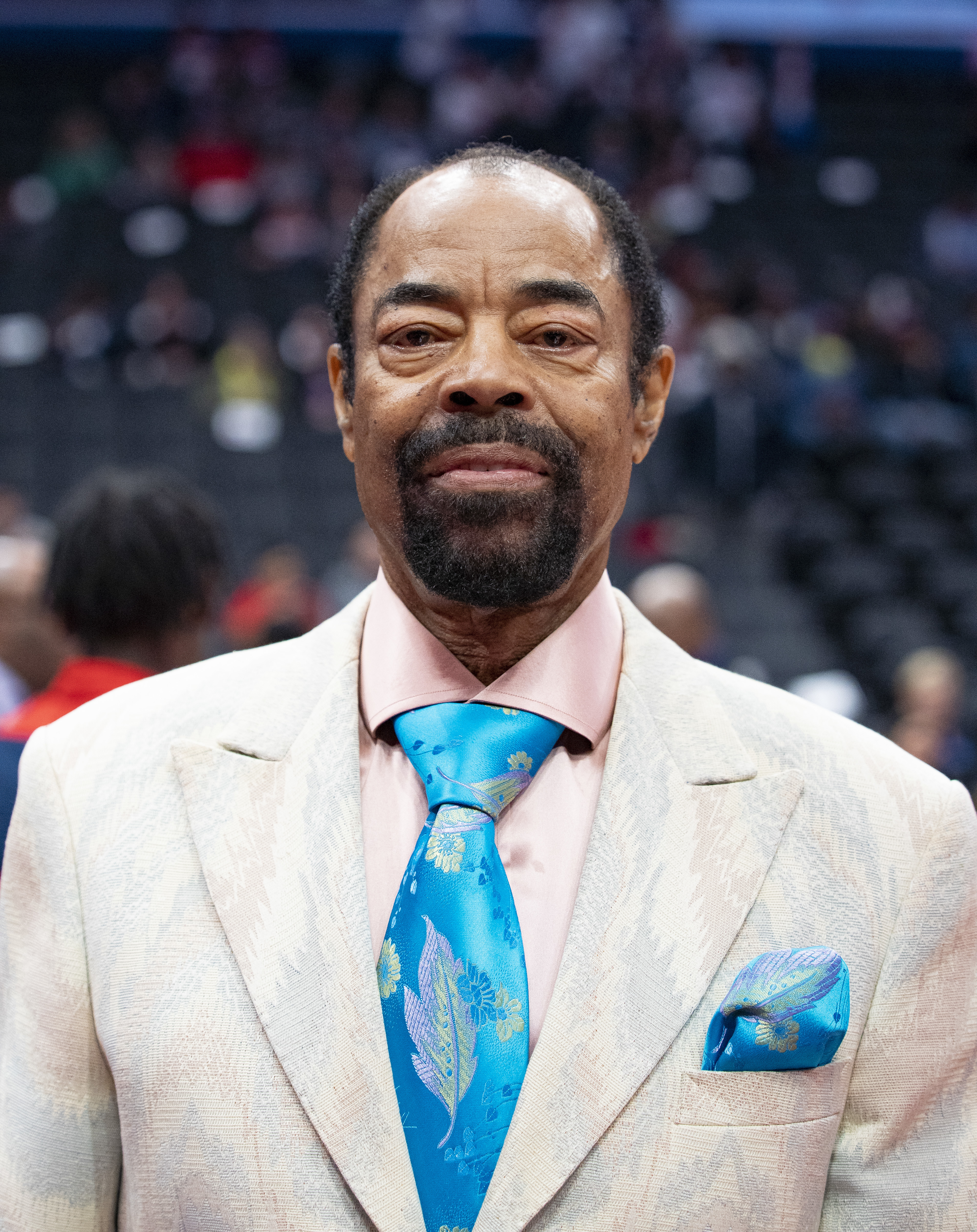
- Frazier in 2020

Personal information
- Born: March 29, 1945 (age 81) Atlanta, Georgia, U.S.
- Listed height: 6 ft 4 in (1.93 m)
- Listed weight: 200 lb (91 kg)

Career information
- High school: David T. Howard (Atlanta, Georgia)
- College: Southern Illinois (1963–1967)
- NBA draft: 1967: 1st round, 5th overall pick
- Drafted by: New York Knicks
- Playing career: 1967–1979
- Position: Point guard
- Number: 10, 11, 52

Career history
- 1967–1977: New York Knicks
- 1977–1979: Cleveland Cavaliers

Career highlights
- 2× NBA champion (1970, 1973); 7× NBA All-Star (1970–1976); NBA All-Star Game MVP (1975); 4× All-NBA First Team (1970, 1972, 1974, 1975); 2× All-NBA Second Team (1971, 1973); 7× NBA All-Defensive First Team (1969–1975); NBA All-Rookie First Team (1968); NBA anniversary team (50th, 75th); No. 10 retired by New York Knicks; NIT champion (1967); NIT MVP (1967); No. 52 retired by Southern Illinois Salukis

Career statistics
- Points: 15,581 (18.9 ppg)
- Rebounds: 4,830 (5.9 rpg)
- Assists: 5,040 (6.1 apg)
- Stats at NBA.com
- Stats at Basketball Reference
- Basketball Hall of Fame
- Collegiate Basketball Hall of Fame

Walter "Clyde" Frazier Jr. (born March 29, 1945) is an American former professional basketball player of the National Basketball Association (NBA). As their floor general and top perimeter defender, he led the New York Knicks to the franchise's first two championships (1970 and 1973), and was inducted into the Naismith Memorial Basketball Hall of Fame in 1987. In 1996, Frazier was honored as one of the league's greatest players of all time by being named to the NBA 50th Anniversary Team. In 2021, he was again honored by being named to the NBA 75th Anniversary Team.

Upon his retirement from basketball, Frazier went into broadcasting; he is currently a color commentator for telecasts of Knicks games on the MSG Network alongside Mike Breen.

== Early life ==
Walter Frazier Jr. was born on March 29, 1945, in Atlanta, Georgia. The eldest of nine children, Frazier attended Atlanta's David Tobias Howard High School. He quarterbacked the football team, and played catcher on the baseball team. He learned basketball on a rutted and dirt playground, the only facility available at his all-black school in the racially segregated South of the 1950s.

== College career ==
Although he was offered other scholarships for his football skills, Frazier accepted a basketball offer from Southern Illinois University, saying that "there were no black quarterbacks, so I played basketball."

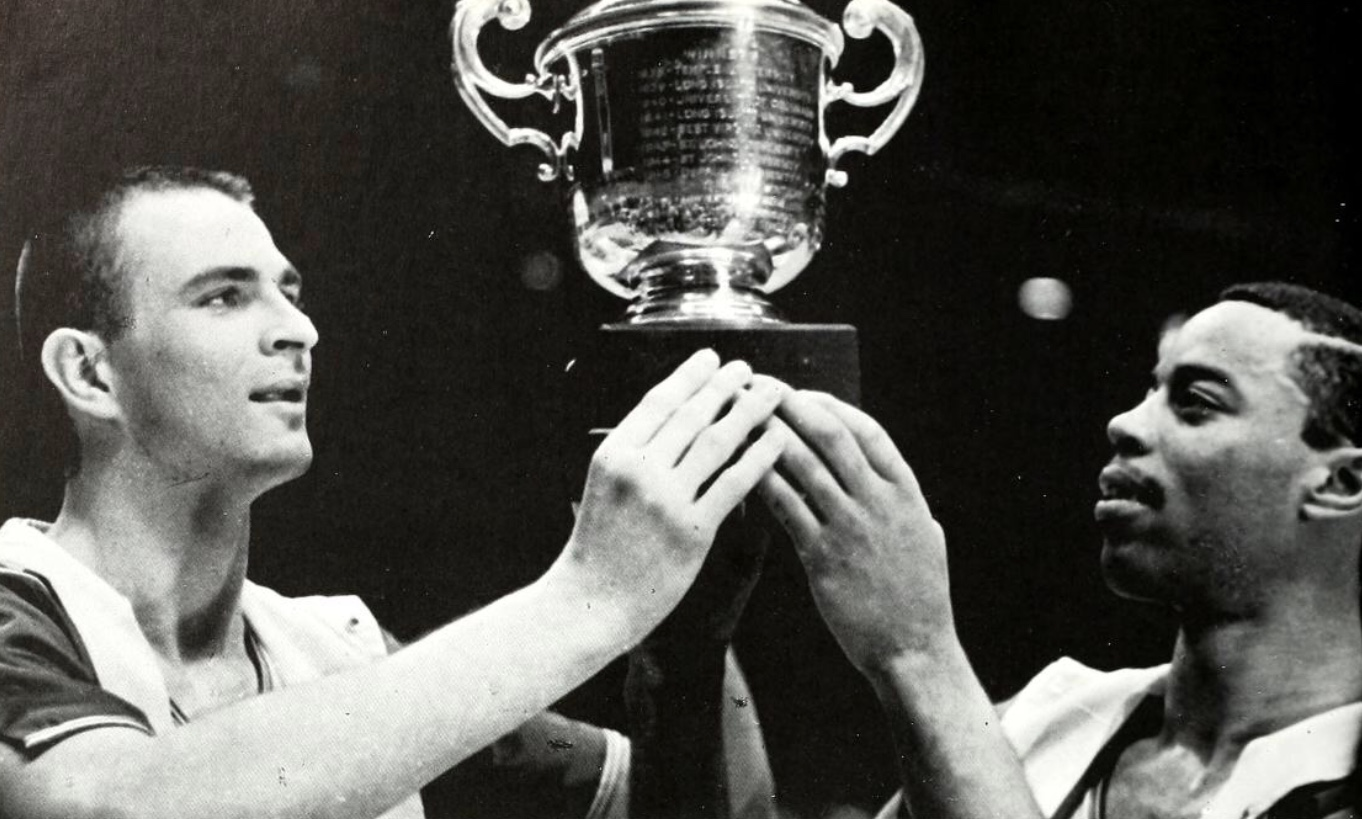
Frazier (right) hoists the 1967 NIT championship trophy with co-captain Ralph Johnson.

Frazier became one of the premier collegiate basketball players in the country. He was named a Division II All-American in 1964 and 1965. As a sophomore in 1965, Frazier led SIU to the NCAA Division II Tournament, only to lose in the finals to Jerry Sloan and the Evansville Purple Aces 85–82 in overtime. In 1966, he was academically ineligible for basketball.

SIU and Frazier won the National Invitation Tournament, defeating Marquette University, 71–56, in the final, in the last college basketball game played at the old Madison Square Garden in New York. Southern Illinois was playing in their final season as a College Division team, and became the only non-Division I/University Division team to win the NIT. After the NCAA began operating the NIT in 2006, non-Division I teams were no longer eligible to participate. Frazier was named Most Valuable Player of the 1967 tournament.

== Professional career ==
=== New York Knicks (1967–1977) ===
Frazier was drafted fifth overall by the New York Knicks in the NBA (as well as drafted in the first round by the Denver Rockets in the upstart American Basketball Association), going on to average 9.0 points per game and be named to the NBA All-Rookie Team during the 1967–68 season. During his rookie season with the Knicks, he picked up the nickname "Clyde" because he wore a fedora similar to that worn by Warren Beatty in his portrayal of Clyde Barrow in the 1967 film Bonnie and Clyde.

As a sophomore, Frazier's 17.5 points, 7.9 assists, and 6.2 rebounds per game averages made him one of the most improved players in the league.

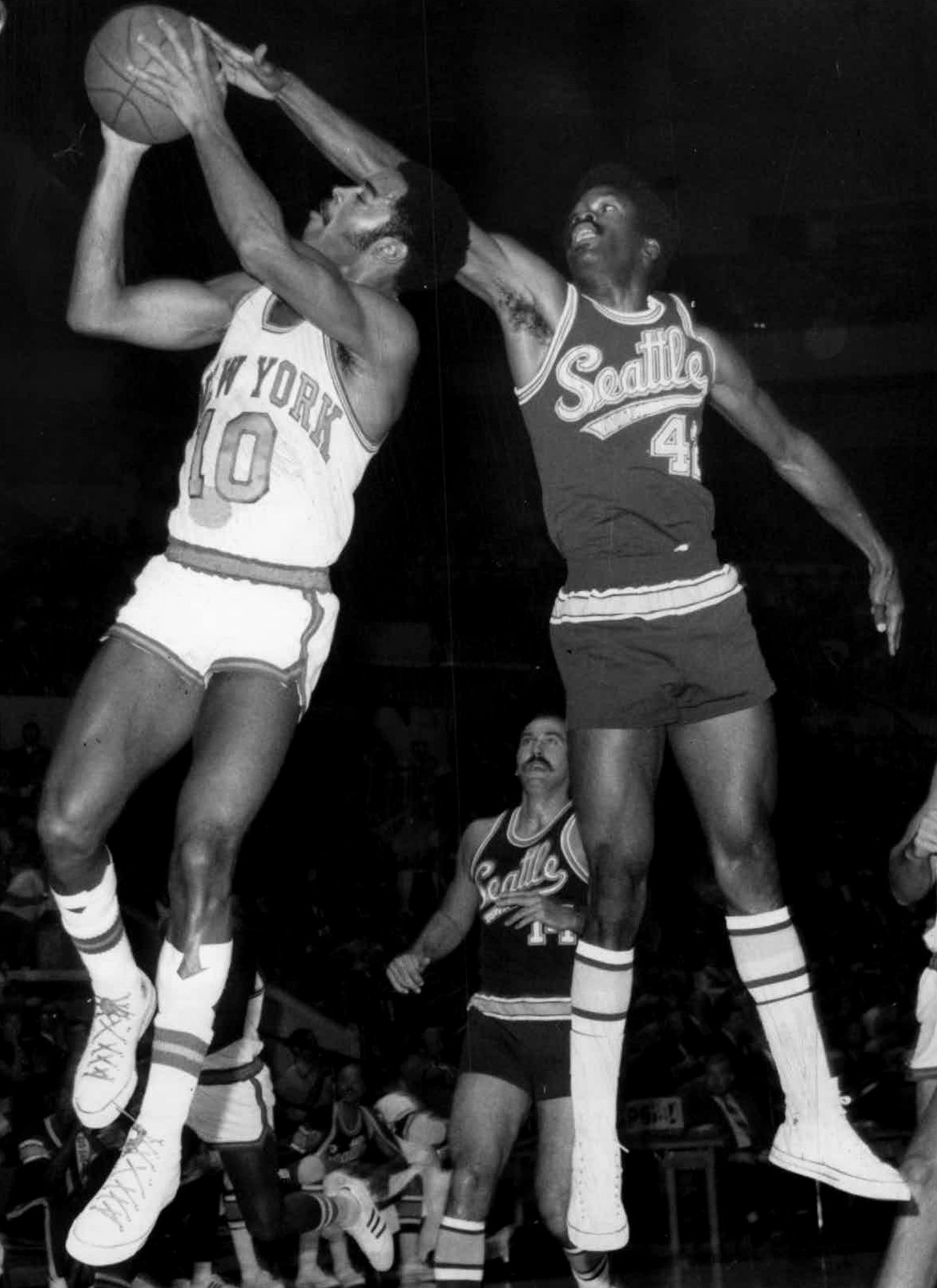
Frazier with the ball while guarded by Lucius Allen in 1969

On October 30, 1969, Frazier recorded 43 points to go along with 9 rebounds and 5 assists in a 123–110 win over the Houston Rockets. Frazier was chosen as an NBA All-Star during the 1969–70 season, the first of seven selections during his 10-year stint with the Knicks.

The Knicks made it to the 1970 NBA Finals thanks to the great play of both Frazier and star teammate Willis Reed. However, in game five, Reed suffered a painful leg injury. With Reed out, chances of the Knicks winning the championship were slim. However, Reed returned to the series, playing the first two minutes of game seven and scoring the Knicks' first four points before limping off. With Reed out, Frazier went on to post one of the greatest performances in NBA playoff history, tallying 36 points, seven rebounds, 19 assists, and six steals in leading New York to victory in what is referred to by ESPN as one of the best game sevens ever played.

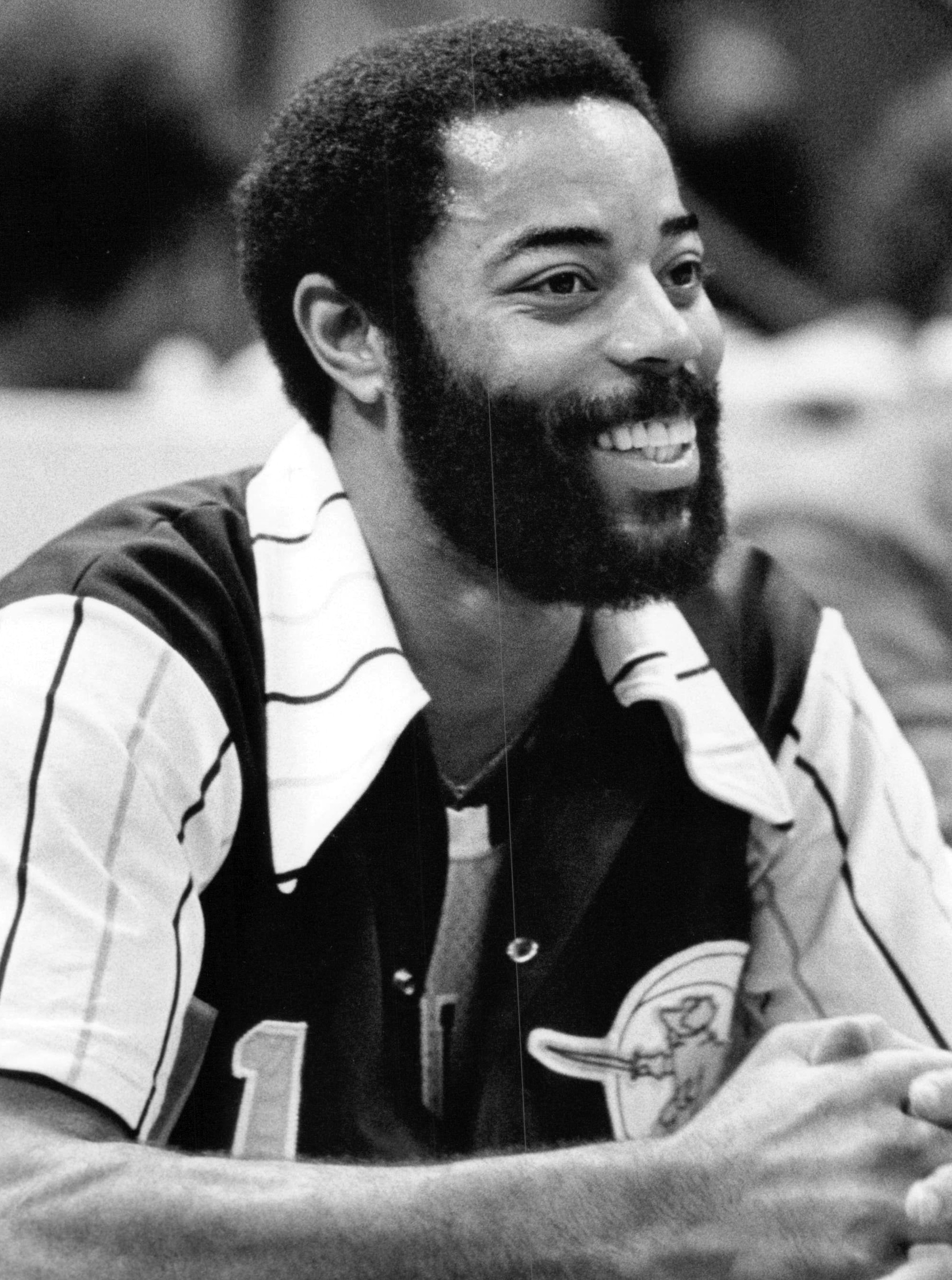
Frazier in 1977

The Knicks were unable to repeat as champions in 1971, falling to the Baltimore Bullets and their star shooting guard Earl Monroe in the Eastern Conference Finals despite Frazier's 20.4 points per game average during the series.

During the off-season, in May 1971, Frazier scored 26 points and was named MVP of an exhibition game played between NBA and ABA All-Stars in Houston's Astrodome.

Following the 1970–71 season, the Knicks traded for Monroe, who was always difficult for Frazier to guard. Not many people thought the two players’ styles would mesh, but Monroe and Frazier soon became one of the best backcourts in the league, even earning the nickname the "Rolls-Royce" backcourt.

The Knicks returned to the NBA Finals in 1972, but fell to the Los Angeles Lakers, who completed a record-setting season with an NBA championship.

Frazier led the Knicks to a second NBA championship in 1973, topping the Lakers in a five-game series. His defense on Jerry West played a major role in defeating the star-filled team.

In 1976, Frazier was selected for his seventh and final NBA All-Star Game.

Frazier held Knicks franchise records for most games (759), minutes played (28,995), field goals attempted (11,669), field goals made (5,736), free throws attempted (4,017), free throws made (3,145), assists (4,791) and points (14,617). Patrick Ewing eventually broke most of those records, but Frazier's assists record still stands.

=== Cleveland Cavaliers (1977–1979) ===
A week before the start of the 1977–78 season, Frazier was traded to the Cleveland Cavaliers for the younger Jim Cleamons; the trade left Frazier stunned, and he later commented that "It was like getting traded to Siberia."

Due in part to repeated foot injuries, Frazier played only 66 games over the course of three seasons with the Cavaliers. He retired midway through the 1979–80 season, when he only played three games and averaged career-lows of 3.3 points and 2.7 assists before being waived.

== Honors ==
- Won 2 NBA championships (1970, 1973) with the New York Knicks.
- 4× NBA All-NBA First Team (1970, 1972, 1974, 1975)
- 2× NBA All-NBA Second Team (1971, 1973)
- 7× NBA All-Star (1970–1976)
- NBA All-Star Game MVP (1975)
- 7× NBA All-Defensive First Team (1969–1975)
- Frazier's no. 10 jersey was retired by the New York Knicks on December 15, 1979.
- Frazier's no. 52 retired by the Southern Illinois Salukis
- Inducted into the Naismith Memorial Basketball Hall of Fame in 1987
- Named one of the 50 Greatest Players in NBA History in 1996.
- In September 2012, Frazier was honored by the Ride of Fame and a double-decker tour bus in New York City was dedicated to him.
- Elected to the NBA 75th Anniversary Team in 2021.
- In September 2022, Frazier was honored with the Curt Gowdy Award, the Naismith Memorial Basketball Hall of Fame's annual tribute given to outstanding broadcasters and journalists.

== NBA career statistics ==
Legend
GP	Games played	GS	Games started	MPG	Minutes per game
FG%	Field goal percentage	3P%	3-point field goal percentage	FT%	Free throw percentage
RPG	Rebounds per game	APG	Assists per game	SPG	Steals per game
BPG	Blocks per game	PPG	Points per game	**Bold**	Career high
†	Won an NBA championship

=== Regular season ===
Year	Team	GP	GS	MPG	FG%	3P%	FT%	RPG	APG	SPG	BPG	PPG
1967–68	New York	74	—	21.5	.451	—	.655	4.2	4.1	—	—	9.0
1968–69	New York	**80**	—	36.9	.505	—	.746	6.2	7.9	—	—	17.5
1969–70†	New York	77	—	39.5	**.518**	—	.748	6.0	**8.2**	—	—	20.9
1970–71	New York	**80**	—	**43.2**	.494	—	.779	6.8	6.7	—	—	21.7
1971–72	New York	77	—	40.6	.512	—	.808	6.7	5.8	—	—	**23.2**
1972–73†	New York	78	—	40.8	.490	—	.817	**7.3**	5.9	—	—	21.1
1973–74	New York	**80**	—	41.7	.472	—	.838	6.7	6.9	2.0	.2	20.5
1974–75	New York	78	—	41.1	.483	—	.828	6.0	6.1	2.4	.2	21.5
1975–76	New York	59	—	41.1	.485	—	.823	6.8	5.9	1.8	.2	19.1
1976–77	New York	76	—	35.4	.489	—	.771	3.9	5.3	1.7	.1	17.4
1977–78	Cleveland	51	—	32.6	.471	—	.850	4.1	4.1	1.5	.3	16.2
1978–79	Cleveland	12	—	23.3	.443	—	.778	1.7	2.7	1.1	.2	10.8
1979–80	Cleveland	3	—	9.0	.364	.000	**1.000**	1.0	2.7	.7	.3	3.3
Career		825	—	37.5	.490	.000	.786	5.9	6.1	1.9	.2	18.9
All-Star		7	7	26.1	.449	—	.857	3.9	3.7	1.3	.0	12.6

=== Playoffs ===
Year	Team	GP	GS	MPG	FG%	3P%	FT%	RPG	APG	SPG	BPG	PPG
1968	New York	4	—	29.8	.364	—	.778	5.5	6.3	—	—	9.5
1969	New York	10	—	41.5	.503	—	.596	7.4	**9.1**	—	—	21.2
1970†	New York	**19**	—	43.9	.478	—	.764	7.8	8.2	—	—	16.0
1971	New York	12	—	41.8	.529	—	.733	5.8	4.5	—	—	22.6
1972	New York	16	—	44.0	.536	—	.736	7.0	6.1	—	—	**24.3**
1973†	New York	17	—	**45.0**	.514	—	.777	7.3	6.2	—	—	21.9
1974	New York	12	—	40.9	.502	—	**.898**	**7.9**	4.0	1.8	.3	22.5
1975	New York	3	—	41.3	**.630**	—	.813	6.7	7.0	3.7	.0	23.7
Career		93	—	42.5	.511	—	.751	7.2	6.4	2.1	.3	20.7

== Style ==
Since the late 1960s, Frazier has been known for being a fashion icon, and was one of the first major pro athletes to be acclaimed as such. The website Clyde So Fly catalogs and grades every suit he wears while broadcasting New York Knicks games on the MSG Network.

Frazier has a line of Puma sneakers named after him. The first Puma Clyde was released in 1973. Until that time, the Converse Chuck Taylor, launched in 1917, was the only basketball sneaker bearing a player's name. Frazier, then, is the first modern NBA star to have his own line of sneakers. The promotional material references Frazier's "signature colorful style".

Frazier's loquacious, rhyming broadcast commentary has become part and parcel of his image. His phrase "posting and toasting" — a description of player moving close to the basket and scoring over a rival — inspired the name of the popular Knicks blog, postingandtoasting.com.

== Personal life ==
Frazier lives in Harlem with his long-term girlfriend, Patricia James, and they also have a home in St. Croix. He is the father of a son referred to both as Walt Jr. and, later, Walt III. Frazier is a member of the fraternity Alpha Phi Alpha.

== See also ==
- List of National Basketball Association career playoff triple-double leaders
