= 1972–73 Chicago Bulls season =

NBA professional basketball team season

- Head coach: Dick Motta
- General manager: Pat Williams
- Owner(s): Dick Klein and Elmer Rich sold team to Arthur Wirtz group
- Arena: Chicago Stadium

Results
- Record: 51–31 (.622)
- Place: Division: 2nd (Midwest); Conference: 3rd (Western)
- Playoff finish: Conference semifinals (lost to Lakers 3–4)
- Stats at Basketball Reference

Local media
- Television: WGN-TV (Jack Brickhouse, Vince Lloyd)
- Radio: WIND (Jack Fleming, Bill Berg)

The 1972–73 Chicago Bulls season was the Bulls' seventh season in the NBA.

== Roster ==
1972–73 Chicago Bulls roster
Players

Pos.	No.	Player	Height	Weight	DOB	From
C	20	Dennis Awtrey	6 ft 10 in (2.08 m)	235 lb (107 kg)	1948-02-22	Santa Clara
C	18	Tom Boerwinkle	7 ft 0 in (2.13 m)	265 lb (120 kg)	1945-08-23	Tennessee
F	23	Rowland Garrett	6 ft 6 in (1.98 m)	210 lb (95 kg)	1950-07-16	Florida State
F	24	Gar Heard	6 ft 6 in (1.98 m)	219 lb (99 kg)	1948-05-03	Oklahoma
G	21	Jim King	6 ft 2 in (1.88 m)	175 lb (79 kg)	1941-02-07	Tulsa
F	10	Bob Love	6 ft 8 in (2.03 m)	215 lb (98 kg)	1942-12-08	Southern
F	54	Howard Porter	6 ft 8 in (2.03 m)	220 lb (100 kg)	1948-08-31	Villanova
C	14	Clifford Ray	6 ft 9 in (2.06 m)	230 lb (104 kg)	1949-01-21	Oklahoma
G	4	Jerry Sloan	6 ft 5 in (1.96 m)	195 lb (88 kg)	1942-03-28	Evansville
G	2	Norm Van Lier	6 ft 1 in (1.85 m)	173 lb (78 kg)	1947-04-01	Saint Francis (PA)
F	25	Chet Walker	6 ft 6 in (1.98 m)	212 lb (96 kg)	1940-02-22	Bradley
G	8	Bob Weiss	6 ft 2 in (1.88 m)	180 lb (82 kg)	1942-05-07	Penn State

Coaches
Head coach
- Dick Motta
Assistant(s)
- Phil Johnson

Legend
- (DP) Unsigned draft pick
- (FA) Free agent
- (S) Suspended
- Injured

Roster
Updated: October 20, 1972

== Regular season ==
=== Season standings ===
Midwest Division	W	L	PCT	GB	Home	Road	Neutral	Div
y-Milwaukee Bucks	60	22	.732	–	33–5	25–15	2–2	15–5
x-Chicago Bulls	51	31	.622	9	29–12	20–19	2–0	10–10
Detroit Pistons	40	42	.488	20	26–15	13–25	1–2	9–11
Kansas City–Omaha Kings	36	46	.439	24	24–17	12–29	–	6–14

#	Western Conference			
#	Team	W	L	PCT
1	z-Milwaukee Bucks	60	22	.732
2	y-Los Angeles Lakers	60	22	.732
3	x-Chicago Bulls	51	31	.622
4	x-Golden State Warriors	47	35	.573
5	Detroit Pistons	40	42	.488
6	Phoenix Suns	38	44	.463
7	Kansas City–Omaha Kings	36	46	.439
8	Seattle SuperSonics	26	56	.317
9	Portland Trail Blazers	21	61	.256

z – clinched division title
y – clinched division title
x – clinched playoff spot

=== Game log ===
1972–73 game log
#	Date	Opponent	Score	High points	Record
1	October 10	Philadelphia	89–95	Chet Walker (24)	1–0
2	October 13	@ Detroit	91–100	Bob Love (20)	1–1
3	October 14	Boston	96–88	Norm Van Lier (18)	1–2
4	October 21	@ Houston	130–97	Bob Love (24)	2–2
5	October 22	@ Los Angeles	99–104	Chet Walker (22)	2–3
6	October 24	@ Phoenix	107–106	Bob Love (29)	3–3
7	October 26	@ Golden State	94–93	Bob Love (30)	4–3
8	October 27	@ Portland	118–95	Bob Love (26)	5–3
9	October 29	@ Seattle	95–94	Chet Walker (28)	6–3
10	October 31	Kansas City–Omaha	95–104	Chet Walker (25)	7–3
11	November 3	Phoenix	100–115	Bob Love (34)	8–3
12	November 4	@ Buffalo	99–101	Bob Love (27)	8–4
13	November 11	@ Baltimore	111–106	Norm Van Lier (28)	9–4
14	November 14	Seattle	80–97	Norm Van Lier (26)	10–4
15	November 17	@ Detroit	96–109	Gar Heard (20)	10–5
16	November 18	Baltimore	79–95	Gar Heard (31)	11–5
17	November 21	Houston	105–113	Jerry Sloan (31)	12–5
18	November 24	Golden State	96–100	Chet Walker (35)	13–5
19	November 25	@ Atlanta	100–99	Chet Walker (25)	14–5
20	November 28	Kansas City–Omaha	92–91	Chet Walker (27)	14–6
21	November 29	@ Milwaukee	97–105	Heard, Weiss (18)	14–7
22	December 1	@ Kansas City–Omaha	106–97 (OT)	Chet Walker (32)	15–7
23	December 2	Seattle	80–89	Chet Walker (22)	16–7
24	December 5	Detroit	108–130	Chet Walker (26)	17–7
25	December 7	Atlanta	94–89 (OT)	Bob Love (26)	17–8
26	December 8	@ Philadelphia	118–102	Bob Love (30)	18–8
27	December 9	Buffalo	94–105	Gar Heard (29)	19–8
28	December 12	Los Angeles	106–105 (OT)	Bob Weiss (21)	19–9
29	December 15	New York	86–90	Bob Love (18)	20–9
30	December 16	@ New York	83–97	Chet Walker (17)	20–10
31	December 19	Portland	109–100	Chet Walker (25)	20–11
32	December 22	@ Portland	127–97	Bob Love (33)	21–11
33	December 23	@ Golden State	109–127	Bob Love (22)	21–12
34	December 25	@ Phoenix	108–115	Bob Love (29)	21–13
35	December 26	Kansas City–Omaha	103–117	Bob Love (30)	22–13
36	December 29	@ Boston	106–99	Bob Love (41)	23–13
37	December 30	Milwaukee	92–99	Bob Love (28)	24–13
38	January 2	Atlanta	90–100	Chet Walker (26)	25–13
39	January 4	Houston	97–111	Love, Walker (25)	26–13
40	January 5	Phoenix	126–115	Bob Love (36)	26–14
41	January 7	Buffalo	96–119	Bob Love (23)	27–14
42	January 9	Philadelphia	110–126	Gar Heard (27)	28–14
43	January 10	@ Kansas City–Omaha	100–102	Bob Love (36)	28–15
44	January 12	Los Angeles	109–97	Bob Love (30)	28–16
45	January 14	@ Milwaukee	95–100	Sloan, Walker (20)	28–17
46	January 16	Portland	89–100	Love, Heard (27)	29–17
47	January 19	Golden State	115–80	Bob Love (23)	29–18
48	January 20	@ Detroit	92–112	Bob Love (32)	29–19
49	January 26	Baltimore	100–110	Bob Love (24)	30–19
50	January 28	Detroit	105–110	Norm Van Lier (29)	31–19
51	January 30	@ Los Angeles	92–95	Norm Van Lier (26)	31–20
52	February 2	@ Seattle	104–118	Norm Van Lier (29)	31–21
53	February 4	Milwaukee	99–121	Bob Love (49)	32–21
54	February 6	Kansas City–Omaha	107–114	Bob Love (49)	33–21
55	February 9	@ Cleveland	103–97	Bob Love (44)	34–21
56	February 10	@ Kansas City–Omaha	102–101	Bob Love (34)	35–21
57	February 11	Golden State	101–96	Chet Walker (36)	35–22
58	February 13	Boston	105–101	Jerry Sloan (20)	35–23
59	February 14	@ New York	100–98	Bob Love (21)	36–23
60	February 16	Cleveland	92–100	Bob Love (27)	37–23
61	February 18	@ Houston	110–99	Chet Walker (23)	38–23
62	February 20	Los Angeles	89–103	Chet Walker (25)	39–23
63	February 23	New York	83–84	Bob Love (24)	40–23
64	February 24	Phoenix	100–122	Bob Love (30)	41–23
65	February 25	@ Seattle	88–85	Bob Weiss (24)	42–23
66	February 27	@ Portland	125–110	Chet Walker (31)	43–23
67	March 2	@ Los Angeles	88–108	Van Lier, Walker (15)	43–24
68	March 3	@ Golden State	117–116	Bob Love (29)	44–24
69	March 4	@ Phoenix	118–117 (OT)	Bob Love (25)	45–24
70	March 6	@ Milwaukee	88–96	Chet Walker (27)	45–25
71	March 8	@ Buffalo	102–112	Bob Love (33)	45–26
72	March 9	N Philadelphia	84–104	Bob Love (26)	46–26
73	March 10	N Baltimore	105–99	Norm Van Lier (28)	47–26
74	March 13	Seattle	89–104	Jim King (20)	48–26
75	March 16	Milwaukee	99–91 (OT)	Chet Walker (30)	48–27
76	March 17	Detroit	99–97	Chet Walker (22)	48–28
77	March 18	@ Detroit	119–107	Norm Van Lier (24)	49–28
78	March 20	Portland	109–123	Bob Love (26)	50–28
79	March 21	@ Boston	105–106	Chet Walker (20)	50–29
80	March 24	@ Atlanta	111–113	Norm Van Lier (26)	50–30
81	March 25	@ Cleveland	105–112	Bob Love (29)	50–31
82	March 27	Cleveland	105–121	Chet Walker (30)	51–31

=== Playoffs ===
1973 playoff game log
Conference semifinals: 3–4 (home: 3–0; road: 0–4)

Game	Date	Team	Score	High points	High rebounds	High assists	Location Attendance	Series
1	March 30	@ Los Angeles	L 104–107 (OT)	Bob Love (21)	Dennis Awtrey (15)	Dennis Awtrey (6)	The Forum; 16,341	0–1
2	April 1	@ Los Angeles	L 93–108	Bob Love (32)	Chet Walker (11)	Tom Boerwinkle (9)	The Forum; 17,368	0–2
3	April 6	Los Angeles	W 96–86	Chet Walker (30)	Dennis Awtrey (14)	Norm Van Lier (8)	Chicago Stadium; 14,606	1–2
4	April 8	Los Angeles	W 98–94	Bob Love (38)	Bob Love (13)	Bob Love (6)	Chicago Stadium; 14,181	2–2
5	April 10	@ Los Angeles	L 102–123	Bob Love (27)	Bob Love (14)	Awtrey, Van Lier (5)	The Forum; 17,505	2–3
6	April 13	Los Angeles	W 101–93	Jerry Sloan (27)	Dennis Awtrey (14)	Dennis Awtrey (8)	Chicago Stadium; 18,096	3–3
7	April 15	@ Los Angeles	L 92–95	Norm Van Lier (28)	Norm Van Lier (14)	Bob Love (5)	The Forum; 17,505	3–4

1973 schedule

== Player statistics ==
Legend
GP	Games played	GS	Games started	MPG	Minutes per game
FG%	Field-goal percentage	3P%	3-point field-goal percentage	FT%	Free-throw percentage
RPG	Rebounds per game	APG	Assists per game	SPG	Steals per game
BPG	Blocks per game	PPG	Points per game

=== Regular season ===
Player	GP	GS	MPG	FG%	3P%	FT%	RPG	APG	SPG	BPG	PPG

=== Playoffs ===
Player	GP	GS	MPG	FG%	3P%	FT%	RPG	APG	SPG	BPG	PPG

== Awards and records ==
- Norm Van Lier, NBA All-Defensive Second Team
- Chet Walker, NBA All-Star Game
- Bob Love, NBA All-Star Game
