= 1972–73 Los Angeles Lakers season =

NBA professional basketball team season

- Conference champions
- Division champions
- Head coach: Bill Sharman
- Arena: The Forum

Results
- Record: 60–22 (.732)
- Place: Division: 1st (Pacific); Conference: 2nd (Western)
- Playoff finish: NBA Finals (lost to Knicks 1–4)
- Stats at Basketball Reference

The 1972–73 Los Angeles Lakers season was the Lakers' 25th season in the NBA and 13th season in Los Angeles.

During the previous season (1971–1972), the Lakers had posted the longest winning streak in NBA history with 33 straight victories. In the 1972 NBA Finals, the Lakers had defeated New York Knicks in five games to win their sixth NBA Championship. However, even though the Lakers managed to make to the NBA Finals for a second consecutive time, they proved unable to repeat as champions. The Knicks defeated them in five games.

Following the season, Wilt Chamberlain retired.

== Offseason ==
=== Draft picks ===
Round	Pick	Player	Position	Nationality	School/Club team
2	16	Jim Price	Guard	United States	Louisville

== Roster ==
1972-73 Los Angeles Lakers roster
Players

Pos.	No.	Player	Height	Weight	DOB	From
F	32	Bill Bridges	6 ft 6 in (1.98 m)	228 lb (103 kg)	1939-04-04	Kansas
C	30	Roger Brown	6 ft 11 in (2.11 m)	225 lb (102 kg)	1950-02-23	Kansas
C	13	Wilt Chamberlain	7 ft 1 in (2.16 m)	275 lb (125 kg)	1936-08-21	Kansas
C	31	Mel Counts	7 ft 0 in (2.13 m)	230 lb (104 kg)	1941-10-16	Oregon State
F	24	Keith Erickson	6 ft 5 in (1.96 m)	195 lb (88 kg)	1944-04-19	UCLA
G	25	Gail Goodrich	6 ft 1 in (1.85 m)	170 lb (77 kg)	1943-04-23	UCLA
F	33	Travis Grant	6 ft 7 in (2.01 m)	215 lb (98 kg)	1950-01-01	Kentucky State
F	52	Happy Hairston	6 ft 7 in (2.01 m)	255 lb (116 kg)	1942-05-31	NYU
F	5	Jim McMillian	6 ft 5 in (1.96 m)	225 lb (102 kg)	1948-03-11	Columbia
G	15	Jim Price	6 ft 3 in (1.91 m)	195 lb (88 kg)	1949-11-27	Louisville
G	12	Pat Riley	6 ft 4 in (1.93 m)	205 lb (93 kg)	1945-03-20	Kentucky
F	30	Bill Turner	6 ft 7 in (2.01 m)	220 lb (100 kg)	1944-02-18	Akron
G	44	Jerry West	6 ft 2 in (1.88 m)	175 lb (79 kg)	1938-05-28	West Virginia

Coaches
Head coach
- Bill Sharman

Legend
- (DP) Unsigned draft pick
- (FA) Free agent
- (S) Suspended
- Injured

Roster
Updated: 2013-03-22

== Regular season ==
The defending champion Lakers returned intact, albeit another year older. They staged another season long battle for best record in the Western Conference with the Milwaukee Bucks. Both teams ended up with 60–22 records and they split their regular season matchups, winning three games apiece. At the time, the NBA had no tiebreaking formula beyond head-to-head record. In a special league meeting, they attempted to schedule a tiebreaking game between the two teams. However, the players' union intervened and demanded the players be paid an extra 1/82 share of the salaries; the owners objected so ultimately the tie was broken by a coin flip, which was won by Milwaukee.

=== Season standings ===
Pacific Division	W	L	PCT	GB	Home	Road	Neutral	Div
y-Los Angeles Lakers	60	22	.732	–	30–11	28–11	2–0	22–4
x-Golden State Warriors	47	35	.573	13	27–14	18–20	2–1	14–12
Phoenix Suns	38	44	.463	22	22–19	15–25	1–0	14–12
Seattle SuperSonics	26	56	.317	34	16–25	10–29	0–2	9–17
Portland Trail Blazers	21	61	.256	39	13–28	8–32	0–1	6–20

#	Western Conference			
#	Team	W	L	PCT
1	z-Milwaukee Bucks	60	22	.732
2	y-Los Angeles Lakers	60	22	.732
3	x-Chicago Bulls	51	31	.622
4	x-Golden State Warriors	47	35	.573
5	Detroit Pistons	40	42	.488
6	Phoenix Suns	38	44	.463
7	Kansas City–Omaha Kings	36	46	.439
8	Seattle SuperSonics	26	56	.317
9	Portland Trail Blazers	21	61	.256

z – clinched division title
y – clinched division title
x – clinched playoff spot

=== Game log ===
1972–73 game log
#	Date	Opponent	Score	High points	Record
1	October 11	@ Kansas City–Omaha	129–94	Jim McMillian (23)	1–0
2	October 13	@ Boston	104–112	Jerry West (21)	1–1
3	October 14	@ New York	100–125	McMillian, Riley, West (18)	1–2
4	October 15	@ Cleveland	95–83	Jerry West (31)	2–2
5	October 20	Portland	104–126	Hairston, McMillian (20)	3–2
6	October 22	Chicago	99–104	Jerry West (35)	4–2
7	October 24	@ Kansas City–Omaha	114–94	Jerry West (29)	5–2
8	October 25	@ Houston	112–107	Jerry West (33)	6–2
9	October 27	Golden State	119–91	Gail Goodrich (19)	6–3
10	October 29	Phoenix	123–133	Gail Goodrich (32)	7–3
11	November 3	Detroit	107–116	Jerry West (28)	8–3
12	November 4	@ Portland	134–120	Gail Goodrich (30)	9–3
13	November 5	@ Seattle	124–115	Jerry West (35)	10–3
14	November 7	Houston	109–122	Happy Hairston (30)	11–3
15	November 10	Cleveland	88–118	Jerry West (27)	12–3
16	November 14	@ Milwaukee	95–92	Jerry West (26)	13–3
17	November 15	@ Detroit	110–99	Gail Goodrich (24)	14–3
18	November 17	Buffalo	100–103	Jerry West (27)	15–3
19	November 19	Philadelphia	95–135	Gail Goodrich (24)	16–3
20	November 24	Detroit	123–140	Gail Goodrich (23)	17–3
21	November 25	@ Phoenix	116–109	Gail Goodrich (27)	18–3
22	November 26	Phoenix	107–112	Jerry West (26)	19–3
23	December 1	Atlanta	114–109 (OT)	Jerry West (33)	19–4
24	December 2	@ Golden State	112–103	McMillian, West (29)	20–4
25	December 5	Milwaukee	94–116	Gail Goodrich (24)	21–4
26	December 8	Seattle	100–119	Happy Hairston (28)	22–4
27	December 10	Portland	101–137	Jim McMillian (28)	23–4
28	December 12	@ Chicago	106–105 (OT)	Gail Goodrich (34)	24–4
29	December 13	@ Philadelphia	128–90	Gail Goodrich (31)	25–4
30	December 15	Boston	102–98	Gail Goodrich (24)	25–5
31	December 19	@ Buffalo	126–100	Gail Goodrich (32)	26–5
32	December 20	@ Baltimore	96–90	Gail Goodrich (18)	27–5
33	December 22	Phoenix	118–110	Gail Goodrich (39)	27–6
34	December 26	Portland	92–116	Gail Goodrich (25)	28–6
35	December 27	@ Houston	104–136	Gail Goodrich (37)	28–7
36	December 29	Kansas City–Omaha	92–121	Jerry West (28)	29–7
37	January 1	@ Seattle	108–103	Gail Goodrich (36)	30–7
38	January 2	@ Golden State	106–112	Gail Goodrich (38)	30–8
39	January 6	@ Cleveland	93–108	Jim McMillian (27)	30–9
40	January 7	@ Milwaukee	92–99	McMillian, West (26)	30–10
41	January 10	@ Philadelphia	120–96	Gail Goodrich (26)	31–10
42	January 12	@ Chicago	109–97	Jerry West (39)	32–10
43	January 14	@ Atlanta	102–100	Jerry West (37)	33–10
44	January 16	Baltimore	112–104	Gail Goodrich (30)	33–11
45	January 19	New York	88–95	Jerry West (32)	34–11
46	January 20	@ Phoenix	124–104	Jerry West (28)	35–11
47	January 21	Kansas City–Omaha	102–123	Wilt Chamberlain (29)	36–11
48	January 26	Golden State	84–100	Jerry West (22)	37–11
49	January 27	@ Golden State	122–107	Jim McMillian (31)	38–11
50	January 28	Seattle	94–130	Wilt Chamberlain (22)	39–11
51	January 30	Chicago	92–95	Jerry West (31)	40–11
52	February 1	@ Phoenix	120–106	Wilt Chamberlain (25)	41–11
53	February 2	Houston	109–126	Goodrich, West (24)	42–11
54	February 4	N Baltimore	125–115	Goodrich, West (28)	43–11
55	February 6	@ New York	95–90	Jim McMillian (27)	44–11
56	February 7	@ Boston	112–113 (OT)	Gail Goodrich (35)	44–12
57	February 9	@ Milwaukee	88–109	Jim McMillian (28)	44–13
58	February 11	Philadelphia	90–108	Jim McMillian (26)	45–13
59	February 13	Seattle	98–101	Gail Goodrich (25)	46–13
60	February 16	Baltimore	103–121	Jim McMillian (26)	47–13
61	February 17	@ Portland	110–103	Gail Goodrich (46)	48–13
62	February 18	Atlanta	99–92	Gail Goodrich (38)	48–14
63	February 20	@ Chicago	89–103	Gail Goodrich (27)	48–15
64	February 21	@ Detroit	98–106	Gail Goodrich (29)	48–16
65	February 23	Golden State	111–106	Jim McMillian (29)	48–17
66	February 25	Milwaukee	82–91	Wilt Chamberlain (24)	49–17
67	February 27	Kansas City–Omaha	107–103	Jim McMillian (34)	49–18
68	March 2	Chicago	88–108	Jerry West (19)	50–18
69	March 4	Cleveland	84–127	Gail Goodrich (32)	51–18
70	March 6	@ Portland	114–102	Gail Goodrich (30)	52–18
71	March 9	Boston	119–111	Jerry West (28)	52–19
72	March 11	Detroit	117–141	Goodrich, McMillian (24)	53–19
73	March 13	@ Buffalo	121–112	Wilt Chamberlain (25)	54–19
74	March 14	@ Detroit	121–112	Gail Goodrich (27)	55–19
75	March 16	New York	109–98	Jerry West (32)	55–20
76	March 18	Phoenix	113–131	Jim McMillian (42)	56–20
77	March 20	@ Atlanta	112–114	Jim McMillian (30)	56–21
78	March 21	@ Kansas City–Omaha	124–118	Jerry West (28)	57–21
79	March 23	Buffalo	101–121	Jim McMillian (22)	58–21
80	March 25	@ Seattle	109–93	Chamberlain, Counts, Goodrich, West (20)	59–21
81	March 27	Milwaukee	85–84	Jim McMillian (32)	59–22
82	March 28	@ Golden State	96–89	Gail Goodrich (26)	60–22

== Playoffs ==
1973 playoff game log
Conference semifinals: 4–3 (home: 4–0; road: 0–3)

Game	Date	Team	Score	High points	High rebounds	High assists	Location Attendance	Series
1	March 30	Chicago	W 107–104 (OT)	Gail Goodrich (28)	Wilt Chamberlain (20)	Jerry West (9)	The Forum; 16,341	1–0
2	April 1	Chicago	W 108–93	Gail Goodrich (33)	Wilt Chamberlain (21)	Jerry West (19)	The Forum; 17,368	2–0
3	April 6	@ Chicago	L 86–96	Jim McMillian (24)	Wilt Chamberlain (18)	Jerry West (13)	Chicago Stadium; 14,606	2–1
4	April 8	@ Chicago	L 94–98	Jim McMillian (25)	Wilt Chamberlain (30)	Goodrich, West (5)	Chicago Stadium; 14,181	2–2
5	April 10	Chicago	W 123–102	Jerry West (36)	Wilt Chamberlain (29)	Jerry West (11)	The Forum; 17,505	3–2
6	April 13	@ Chicago	L 93–101	Jerry West (19)	Wilt Chamberlain (26)	Jerry West (5)	Chicago Stadium; 18,096	3–3
7	April 15	Chicago	W 95–92	Jerry West (27)	Wilt Chamberlain (28)	Jerry West (7)	The Forum; 17,505	4–3

Conference finals: 4–1 (home: 3–0; road: 1–1)

Game	Date	Team	Score	High points	High rebounds	High assists	Location Attendance	Series
1	April 17	Golden State	W 101–99	Jim McMillian (37)	Wilt Chamberlain (25)	Jerry West (8)	The Forum; 17,505	1–0
2	April 19	Golden State	W 104–93	Jerry West (36)	Wilt Chamberlain (20)	Jerry West (6)	The Forum; 17,505	2–0
3	April 21	@ Golden State	W 126–70	Jim McMillian (28)	Wilt Chamberlain (25)	Jerry West (11)	Oakland–Alameda County Coliseum Arena; 13,183	3–0
4	April 23	@ Golden State	L 109–117	Jerry West (32)	Wilt Chamberlain (16)	Gail Goodrich (7)	Oakland–Alameda County Coliseum Arena; 8,000	3–1
5	April 25	Golden State	W 128–118	Gail Goodrich (44)	Wilt Chamberlain (22)	Jerry West (9)	The Forum; 17,505	4–1

NBA Finals: 1–4 (home: 1–2; road: 0–2)

Game	Date	Team	Score	High points	High rebounds	High assists	Location Attendance	Series
1	May 1	New York	W 115–112	Gail Goodrich (30)	Wilt Chamberlain (20)	Wilt Chamberlain (6)	The Forum; 17,505	1–0
2	May 3	New York	L 95–99	Jerry West (32)	Wilt Chamberlain (20)	Goodrich, West (5)	The Forum; 17,505	1–1
3	May 6	@ New York	L 83–87	Jim McMillian (22)	Wilt Chamberlain (13)	Wilt Chamberlain (5)	Madison Square Garden; 19,694	1–2
4	May 8	@ New York	L 98–103	Goodrich, West (23)	Wilt Chamberlain (19)	Bill Bridges (7)	Madison Square Garden; 19,694	1–3
5	May 10	New York	L 93–102	Gail Goodrich (28)	Wilt Chamberlain (21)	Jerry West (4)	The Forum; 17,505	1–4

1973 schedule

== Awards and records ==
- Jerry West, All-NBA First Team
- Jerry West, NBA All-Defensive First Team
- Wilt Chamberlain, NBA All-Defensive First Team
- Jerry West, NBA All-Star Game
- Wilt Chamberlain, NBA All-Star Game
- Gail Goodrich, NBA All-Star Game
- Jim Price, NBA All-Rookie Team 1st Team
