= 1972–73 NBA season =

27th NBA season

- League: National Basketball Association
- Sport: Basketball
- Duration: October 10, 1972 – March 28, 1973; March 30 – April 29, 1973 (Playoffs); May 1–10, 1973 (Finals)
- Games: 82
- Teams: 17
- TV partner: ABC

Draft
- Top draft pick: LaRue Martin
- Picked by: Portland Trail Blazers

Regular season
- Top seed: Boston Celtics
- Season MVP: Dave Cowens (Boston)
- Top scorer: Nate Archibald (Kansas City–Omaha)

Playoffs
- Eastern champions: New York Knicks
- Eastern runners-up: Boston Celtics
- Western champions: Los Angeles Lakers
- Western runners-up: Golden State Warriors

Finals
- Champions: New York Knicks
- Runners-up: Los Angeles Lakers
- Finals MVP: Willis Reed (New York)

NBA seasons
- ← 1971–72 1973–74 →

The 1972–73 NBA season was the 27th season of the National Basketball Association. The season ended with the New York Knicks winning the NBA championship, beating the Los Angeles Lakers 4 games to 1 in the NBA Finals. This would be Wilt Chamberlain's final season playing in the NBA.

== Notable occurrences ==
- The Cincinnati Royals relocated and became the Kansas City-Omaha Kings, splitting home games between Kansas City, Missouri and Omaha, Nebraska.
- The relocated Kings were moved from the Central Division of the Eastern Conference to the Midwest Division of the Western Conference. The Phoenix Suns were moved from the Midwest Division to the Pacific Division, and the Houston Rockets were moved to the Central Division in the spot formerly occupied by the Royals, despite being farther west than all four teams (Kansas City-Omaha, Chicago Bulls, Detroit Pistons and Milwaukee Bucks) in the Midwest.
- Nate "Tiny" Archibald of the Kings became the first NBA player to officially lead the league in both points and assists during the same season. Oscar Robertson had led the league in average points and assists in the 1967–68 season, but at that time statistical leaders were based on totals, not averages. Therefore, Robertson did not officially lead the league due to missing 17 regular season games.
- The 1973 NBA All-Star Game was played at Chicago Stadium in Chicago, with the East beating the West 104–84. Dave Cowens of the Boston Celtics won the game's MVP award.
- The Atlanta Hawks played their inaugural season in the Omni Coliseum.
- The Baltimore Bullets played their final season in Baltimore, before relocating to the Washington, D.C. suburb of Landover, Maryland as the Capital Bullets for the following season. The Bullets would return to Baltimore for a few home games each season from 1989–1997.
- This was the final season of the NBA on ABC. However, the network would regain NBA coverage starting in the 2002–03 season.
- The Philadelphia 76ers finished with a 9–73 record. Their 0.110 winning percentage was the all-time worst mark in the NBA until the 2011–12 Charlotte Bobcats finished a shortened season with a 0.106 winning percentage. It remains the worst record for an 82-game season. The 76ers also became the first team to lose 70 games in a season and the only team to win fewer than 10 games in an 82-game season.
- This was Wilt Chamberlain's final NBA season. Leading the league in both rebounds per game and field goal percentage, he remains the only NBA player in league history to lead the league in a major statistical category in every eligible season of his career. In addition, his field goal percentage of .727 was an NBA single-season record until the 2019–20 season, when Mitchell Robinson was approximately 1.5% more accurate while attempting 245 fewer field goals than Chamberlain.
- It was also the final season for Hal Greer, Gus Johnson, Tom Sanders, and Kevin Loughery who would later become the head coach for the New York Nets of the American Basketball Association.
- At the end of three quarters of their game at the Boston Garden on October 20, 1972, the Boston Celtics led the Buffalo Braves 103–60. The Braves then recorded an incredible turnaround, scoring 58 points in the last quarter to lose the game by just 8 points, 126–118. The 58 points scored by the Braves is still the NBA record for the most points scored by one team in any quarter of any game
- Free throws on common (non-shooting) fouls in the frontcourt prior to the fifth team foul of a quarter are eliminated. Teams instead receive possession out of bounds at the point of interruption. Backcourt fouls prior to the penalty still result in two free throws (three to make two if the fouling team is over the limit).

Coaching changes
Offseason
| Team | 1971–72 coach | 1972–73 coach |
|---|---|---|
| Atlanta Hawks | Richie Guerin | Cotton Fitzsimmons |
| Buffalo Braves | Johnny McCarthy | Jack Ramsay |
| Phoenix Suns | Cotton Fitzsimmons | Butch Van Breda Kolff |
| Philadelphia 76ers | Jack Ramsay | Roy Rubin |
| Portland Trail Blazers | Rolland Todd | Jack McCloskey |
In-season
| Team | Outgoing coach | Incoming coach |
| Detroit Pistons | Earl Lloyd | Ray Scott |
| Houston Rockets | Tex Winter | Johnny Egan |
| Philadelphia 76ers | Roy Rubin | Kevin Loughery |
| Seattle SuperSonics | Tom Nissalke | Bucky Buckwalter |

== Season recap ==
=== Setting the scene ===
This season began in the wake of the remarkable victory of the Los Angeles Lakers, who ended an agonizing decade of runner-up finishes with their first NBA title on the West Coast. It was also the first Laker title since George Mikan over fifteen years previous. The '71–'72 title had come after a tremendous Western Conference Finals with Milwaukee and their superstar center, Kareem Abdul-Jabbar, the former title-winning Lew Alcindor. A Laker and Bucks rematch in the playoffs figured to decide the next championship just as it had the last two. The East, clearly the dominant half of the league for so long, looked to be the weaker half again at the start of this season as they had the last two years.

=== Eastern Conference ===
It was the East that provided the season's top record. The Boston Celtics won 68 of 82 NBA games, one of the greatest records in history, two more than Milwaukee two years before, and just one less than Los Angeles the previous year. The new Celtics were a year older, with young star Dave Cowens at center and Jo Jo White as point guard. Cowens was the team's anchor at center, third in the league in both rebounds and minutes played while scoring 20.5 points per game. A physical, active defender as well, Cowens made NBA observers marvel at his energy level and intensity. At 6' 9, he cast a huge presence for his team. Longtime star John Havlicek was still the team's leader, leading the team in scoring, assists and steals. Along with Cowens up front, Boston had tabbed Paul Silas from Phoenix to take the load off of "Hondo" inside. The results included more shots tried and made, more rebounds and more assists than any other NBA team this season.

In the East, Boston drew an Atlanta team with 46 wins, led by high scorers Lou Hudson and Pete Maravich, who scored 29.7 and 26.2 points per game respectively. Richie Guerin was again the head coach with the small rotation of minutes. Boston jumped on them big early on to win the series four games to two.

Just under the radar was another tough New York – Baltimore matchup. Both teams had over 50 wins and looked very comparable. Baltimore had added big man Elvin Hayes to help Wes Unseld on the boards and Archie Clark in the scoring column. Yet the Knicks, with 57 wins, did not play around with the Bullets, winning the series 4–1. The Knicks, with three key big men well past age 30, were supporting All-NBA guard Walt Frazier this year in hopes of one last shot at the top themselves. They again had the league's top defense. Now another hotly debated Boston-New York matchup loomed in the East final.

Boston was again the favorite over New York, though many still remembered New York's underdog romp the year before. Leaving little to chance, Boston pounded them 134–109 at home in Game One. New York repaid the favor in Game Two, 129–96. Then, the Knicks stole one in Boston before a double-overtime contest in Game Four at Madison Square Garden. New York hung on to win that as well. New York was up 3–1, but coach Tom Heinsohn's team rallied to win a one-pointer in Game Five, and then Game Six to force a seventh game. But John Havlicek had a badly injured shoulder, playing with a sling and was now shooting left-handed. Because of Havlicek's injury, New York easily handled Boston to complete the series victory, becoming the 1st NBA road team to win Game 7 after leading series 3–1. It was a tough break for Havlicek, who would burn to return the following year, while New York was back in the NBA Finals for the third time in four years.

=== Western Conference ===
The Lakers got another rebounding title from Wilt Chamberlain, the eleventh of his colossal career. Wilt also sank an unreal 72.7% of his shots, though he continued to shoot less and less. Chamberlain averaged 13.2 points per game, a far cry from his 50 points per game twelve years before. However, Wilt knew he was part of a team concept that was a proven winner. Jerry West and Gail Goodrich were the scorers again, with Jim McMillian the ready third threat. The Lakers lost key rebounder Happy Hairston after 28 games, but brought over rebounding legend Bill Bridges from crumbling Philadelphia. The Lakers eventually won 60 games.

Milwaukee got another huge year from Abdul-Jabbar, who looked again to be the NBA's top player. His 30.2 points per game were second in the league, and he was fourth in rebounds. Only one player, Kansas City's Nate Archibald, scored more points. Only two, Archibald and Seattle's Spencer Haywood, tried more shots. But Abdul-Jabbar sank 55% of his shots, tops among high-scoring NBA shooters, and likely again blocked more shots than any big man in the league. The seven footer also added five assists per game. A balanced cast of Bucks supported Abdul-Jabbar en route to another 60-win campaign, their third straight. But both teams were showing some gray streaks as West, Chamberlain, and Oscar Robertson, all all-time greats, were each clearly approaching the end of remarkable careers. The three 60-win monsters drew most of the attention as playoff time arrived, which again rigidly followed the NBA's four divisions. All of the NBA's eight winning teams neatly made the field.

Los Angeles would again turn away a solid Dick Motta coached Chicago club. The series went the full seven games, which showed the Lakers had clearly dropped a couple notches. Game one had been an overtime affair, while LA needed their fourth home game to win Game Seven 95–92. Chicago, like Baltimore and Atlanta, had become the solid second-tier team that could not get past the giants.

Milwaukee looked to be that fourth giant as they met the 47-win Golden State Warriors. Nate Thurmond wanted to prove he could defend the league's best center and he surely did, dropping Abdul-Jabbar's scoring by eight points and shooting by 12% in the series. Rick Barry had finally rejoined his NBA team from five years ago also, and Clyde Lee starred as well helping Thurmond to a 4–2 series win that wasn't really very close. Game Six ended 100–86. Milwaukee's Robertson saw a solid series fall short.

Meanwhile, Los Angeles was resting, having used three 20-point scorers and Chamberlain's dominance inside to brush off Golden State 4–1. Al Attles' Warriors may still have been celebrating their win over Milwaukee. Game Three was a huge 126–70 Laker win in Oakland. The Warriors won Game Four, but all it did was force the series back to Southern California, where the Lakers clinched in Game Five.

=== The NBA Finals ===
The NBA had their third New York – Los Angeles matchup in four years, which marked this remarkable period in media attention. Chamberlain was the giant favorite again at age 36, a role which rarely suited him. Meanwhile, New York used a tandem at center. Thick Willis Reed, sore knees and all, had been kept fresh for the playoffs thanks to Jerry Lucas, primarily a center once again. The two had come to be known as 'Willis Lucas' averaging 22 points and 15 rebounds a game combined during the year. Neither were great shot blockers but both were smart, tough and unselfish, a trait also shared by forward Dave DeBusschere, who was still a very key part of the Knicks success.

Like Robertson, Jerry West reached for the greatness of years past and found some of it gone forever. Earl Monroe eagerly gave Gail Goodrich a better match this time as well. Chamberlain chose not to shoot again, scoring just 10.4 per game in the playoffs for another enigmatic performance that again gave his opponents their opening.

Los Angeles edged out a win in Game One at home. After that, the team concept of New York took over to win the remaining four games. It was clearly revenge for the year before. In a year highlighted by the graying of some of the game's greatest players, New York's three big men had keyed an impressive title run past tough rivals and two 60-win teams to cap impressive careers. For Chamberlain and West, it was one more runner-up finish for the road.

== Final standings ==
=== By division ===
| Atlantic Division | W | L | PCT | GB | Home | Road | Neutral | Div |
|---|---|---|---|---|---|---|---|---|
| y-Boston Celtics | 68 | 14 | .829 | – | 33–6 | 32–8 | 3–0 | 18–4 |
| x-New York Knicks | 57 | 25 | .695 | 11 | 35–6 | 21–18 | 1–1 | 16–6 |
| Buffalo Braves | 21 | 61 | .256 | 47 | 14–27 | 6–31 | 1–3 | 8–14 |
| Philadelphia 76ers | 9 | 73 | .110 | 59 | 5–26 | 2–36 | 2–11 | 2–20 |

| Central Division | W | L | PCT | GB | Home | Road | Neutral | Div |
|---|---|---|---|---|---|---|---|---|
| y-Baltimore Bullets | 52 | 30 | .634 | – | 24–9 | 21–17 | 7–4 | 17–5 |
| x-Atlanta Hawks | 46 | 36 | .561 | 6 | 28–13 | 17–23 | 1–0 | 10–12 |
| Houston Rockets | 33 | 49 | .402 | 19 | 14–14 | 10–28 | 9–7 | 9–13 |
| Cleveland Cavaliers | 32 | 50 | .390 | 20 | 20–21 | 10–27 | 2–2 | 8–14 |

| Midwest Division | W | L | PCT | GB | Home | Road | Neutral | Div |
|---|---|---|---|---|---|---|---|---|
| y-Milwaukee Bucks | 60 | 22 | .732 | – | 33–5 | 25–15 | 2–2 | 15–5 |
| x-Chicago Bulls | 51 | 31 | .622 | 9 | 29–12 | 20–19 | 2–0 | 10–10 |
| Detroit Pistons | 40 | 42 | .488 | 20 | 26–15 | 13–25 | 1–2 | 9–11 |
| Kansas City–Omaha Kings | 36 | 46 | .439 | 24 | 24–17 | 12–29 | – | 6–14 |

| Pacific Division | W | L | PCT | GB | Home | Road | Neutral | Div |
|---|---|---|---|---|---|---|---|---|
| y-Los Angeles Lakers | 60 | 22 | .732 | – | 30–11 | 28–11 | 2–0 | 22–4 |
| x-Golden State Warriors | 47 | 35 | .573 | 13 | 27–14 | 18–20 | 2–1 | 14–12 |
| Phoenix Suns | 38 | 44 | .463 | 22 | 22–19 | 15–25 | 1–0 | 14–12 |
| Seattle SuperSonics | 26 | 56 | .317 | 34 | 16–25 | 10–29 | 0–2 | 9–17 |
| Portland Trail Blazers | 21 | 61 | .256 | 39 | 13–28 | 8–32 | 0–1 | 6–20 |

=== By conference ===
| # | Eastern Conference | | | |
| # | Team | W | L | PCT |
|---|---|---|---|---|
| 1 | z-Boston Celtics | 68 | 14 | .829 |
| 2 | x-New York Knicks | 57 | 25 | .695 |
| 3 | y-Baltimore Bullets | 52 | 30 | .634 |
| 4 | x-Atlanta Hawks | 46 | 36 | .561 |
| 5 | Houston Rockets | 33 | 49 | .402 |
| 6 | Cleveland Cavaliers | 32 | 50 | .390 |
| 7 | Buffalo Braves | 21 | 61 | .256 |
| 8 | Philadelphia 76ers | 9 | 73 | .110 |

| # | Western Conference | | | |
| # | Team | W | L | PCT |
|---|---|---|---|---|
| 1 | z-Milwaukee Bucks | 60 | 22 | .732 |
| 2 | y-Los Angeles Lakers | 60 | 22 | .732 |
| 3 | x-Chicago Bulls | 51 | 31 | .622 |
| 4 | x-Golden State Warriors | 47 | 35 | .573 |
| 5 | Detroit Pistons | 40 | 42 | .488 |
| 6 | Phoenix Suns | 38 | 44 | .463 |
| 7 | Kansas City–Omaha Kings | 36 | 46 | .439 |
| 8 | Seattle SuperSonics | 26 | 56 | .317 |
| 9 | Portland Trail Blazers | 21 | 61 | .256 |

Notes

- z, y – division champions
- x – clinched playoff spot

== Playoffs ==
Conference Semifinals
E1 | Boston* | 4
E4 | Atlanta | 2
Eastern Conference
E3 | Baltimore* | 1
E2 | New York | 4
W1 | Milwaukee* | 2
W4 | Golden State | 4
Western Conference
W3 | Chicago | 3
W2 | Los Angeles* | 4

Conference Finals
E1 | Boston* | 3
E2 | New York | 4
W4 | Golden State | 1
W2 | Los Angeles* | 4

NBA Finals
E2 | New York | 4
W2 | Los Angeles* | 1

- * Division winner
- Bold Series winner
- Italic Team with home-court advantage

== Statistics leaders ==
| Category | Player | Team | Stat |
|---|---|---|---|
| Points per game | Nate Archibald | Kansas City-Omaha Kings | 34.0 |
| Rebounds per game | Wilt Chamberlain | Los Angeles Lakers | 18.6 |
| Assists per game | Nate Archibald | Kansas City-Omaha Kings | 11.4 |
| FG% | Wilt Chamberlain | Los Angeles Lakers | .727 |
| FT% | Rick Barry | Golden State Warriors | .902 |

== NBA awards ==
- Most Valuable Player: Dave Cowens, Boston Celtics
- Rookie of the Year: Bob McAdoo, Buffalo Braves
- Coach of the Year: Tom Heinsohn, Boston Celtics
- All-NBA First Team:
  - F – John Havlicek, Boston Celtics
  - F – Spencer Haywood, Seattle SuperSonics
  - C – Kareem Abdul-Jabbar, Milwaukee Bucks
  - G – Nate Archibald, Kansas City-Omaha Kings
  - G – Jerry West, Los Angeles Lakers
- All-NBA Second Team:
  - F – Elvin Hayes, Capital Bullets
  - F – Rick Barry, Golden State Warriors
  - C – Dave Cowens, Boston Celtics
  - G – Walt Frazier, New York Knicks
  - G – Pete Maravich, Atlanta Hawks
- All-NBA Rookie Team:
  - Dwight Davis, Cleveland Cavaliers
  - Bob McAdoo, Buffalo Braves
  - Fred Boyd, Philadelphia 76ers
  - Jim Price, Los Angeles Lakers
  - Lloyd Neal, Portland Trail Blazers
- NBA All-Defensive First Team:
  - Dave DeBusschere, New York Knicks
  - John Havlicek, Boston Celtics
  - Wilt Chamberlain, Los Angeles Lakers
  - Jerry West, Los Angeles Lakers
  - Walt Frazier, New York Knicks
- NBA All-Defensive Second Team:
  - Paul Silas, Boston Celtics
  - Mike Riordan, Baltimore Bullets
  - Nate Thurmond, Golden State Warriors
  - Norm Van Lier, Chicago Bulls
  - Don Chaney, Boston Celtics

== See also ==
- 1973 NBA Finals
- 1973 NBA playoffs
- 1972–73 ABA season
- List of NBA regular season records
