= 1972–73 Kansas City–Omaha Kings season =

NBA professional basketball team season

- Head coach: Bob Cousy
- General manager: Joe Axelson
- Owners: Max Jacobs; Jeremy Jacobs
- Arena: Municipal Auditorium; Omaha Civic Auditorium

Results
- Record: 36–46 (.439)
- Place: Division: 4th (Midwest); Conference: 7th (Western)
- Playoff finish: Did not qualify
- Stats at Basketball Reference

Local media
- Television: KMBC-TV/KETV
- Radio: KCMO/KFAB

The 1972–73 Kansas City–Omaha Kings season was the Kings' 24th season in the NBA and their first season in the cities of Kansas City and Omaha. This season, Nate Archibald won the scoring and assist titles and made the All-NBA 1st Team, but the Kings missed the playoffs.

== Roster ==
1972–73 Kansas City–Omaha Kings roster
Players

Pos.	No.	Player	Height	Weight	DOB	From
G	10	Nate Archibald	6 ft 1 in (1.85 m)	165 lb (75 kg)		UTEP
F	34	John Block	6 ft 9 in (2.06 m)	207 lb (94 kg)		USC
F	33	Ken Durrett	6 ft 7 in (2.01 m)	190 lb (86 kg)		La Salle
PF	20	Johnny Green	6 ft 5 in (1.96 m)	200 lb (91 kg)		Michigan State
F	18	Toby Kimball	6 ft 6 in (1.98 m)	220 lb (100 kg)		Connecticut
F	21	Don Kojis	6 ft 5 in (1.96 m)	215 lb (98 kg)		Marquette
C	44	Sam Lacey	6 ft 10 in (2.08 m)	235 lb (107 kg)		New Mexico State
C	43	Mike Ratliff	6 ft 10 in (2.08 m)	230 lb (104 kg)		UW–Eau Claire
G	15	Frank Schade	6 ft 1 in (1.85 m)	170 lb (77 kg)		UW–Eau Claire
G/F	22	Nate Williams	6 ft 5 in (1.96 m)	215 lb (98 kg)		Utah State

Coaches
Head coach
- Bob Cousy

Legend
- (DP) Unsigned draft pick
- (FA) Free agent
- (S) Suspended
- Injured

== Regular season ==
=== Season standings ===
Midwest Division	W	L	PCT	GB	Home	Road	Neutral	Div
y-Milwaukee Bucks	60	22	.732	–	33–5	25–15	2–2	15–5
x-Chicago Bulls	51	31	.622	9	29–12	20–19	2–0	10–10
Detroit Pistons	40	42	.488	20	26–15	13–25	1–2	9–11
Kansas City–Omaha Kings	36	46	.439	24	24–17	12–29	–	6–14

#	Western Conference			
#	Team	W	L	PCT
1	z-Milwaukee Bucks	60	22	.732
2	y-Los Angeles Lakers	60	22	.732
3	x-Chicago Bulls	51	31	.622
4	x-Golden State Warriors	47	35	.573
5	Detroit Pistons	40	42	.488
6	Phoenix Suns	38	44	.463
7	Kansas City–Omaha Kings	36	46	.439
8	Seattle SuperSonics	26	56	.317
9	Portland Trail Blazers	21	61	.256

z – clinched division title
y – clinched division title
x – clinched playoff spot

=== Game log ===
1972–73 game log
Total: 36–46
October

Game	Date	Team	Score	High points	Location Attendance	Record
1	October 11	Los Angeles	L 129–129	Nate Archibald (31)	Omaha Civic Auditorium	0–1
2	October 14	Detroit	W 113–101	Nate Archibald (38)		1–1
3	October 19	Baltimore	L 83–94	Nate Archibald (34)		1–2
4	October 21	Atlanta	W 108–101	Nate Archibald (43)		2–2
5	October 24	Los Angeles	L 94–114	Nate Archibald (33)		2–3
6	October 26	Milwaukee	L 107–114	Nate Archibald (28)		2–4
7	October 28	@ Buffalo	W 113–102	Nate Archibald (34)		3–4
8	October 29	@ Cleveland	L 97–115	Nate Archibald (35)		3–5
9	October 31	@ Chicago	L 95–104	Nate Archibald (30)		3–6

November

Game	Date	Team	Score	High points	Location Attendance	Record
10	November 1	New York	L 85–122	Nate Archibald (19)	Omaha Civic Auditorium	3–7
11	November 3	@ Philadelphia	W 114–101	Nate Archibald (38)		4–7
12	November 4	@ Boston	W 118–107	Nate Archibald (35)		5–7
13	November 8	Philadelphia	W 125–107	Nate Archibald (34)	Omaha Civic Auditorium	6–7
14	November 10	@ Seattle	W 111–106	Nate Archibald (34)		7–7
15	November 12	@ Portland	L 100–102	Nate Archibald (28)		7–8
16	November 14	Buffalo	W 106–100	Nate Archibald (23)	Omaha Civic Auditorium	8–8
17	November 15	Seattle	W 106–97	Nate Archibald (47)		9–8
18	November 17	Cleveland	W 115–96	Nate Archibald (40)		10–8
19	November 18	Houston	W 127–117	Nate Archibald (51)	Omaha Civic Auditorium	11–8
20	November 21	Phoenix	W 101–96	Nate Archibald (37)		12–8
21	November 24	@ Milwaukee	L 106–115	Nate Archibald (26)		12–9
22	November 25	Golden State	L 114–133	Nate Archibald (37)		12–10
23	November 28	@ Chicago	W 92–91	Nate Archibald (32)		13–10
24	November 29	Portland	W 110–102	Nate Archibald (32)		14–10

December

Game	Date	Team	Score	High points	Location Attendance	Record
25	December 1	Chicago	L 97–106 (OT)	Nate Archibald (36)		14–11
26	December 2	@ Houston	W 114–109	Nate Archibald (36)		15–11
27	December 5	@ New York	L 103–125	Nate Archibald (26)		15–12
28	December 6	@ Philadelphia	L 117–122	Nate Archibald (34)		15–13
29	December 8	@ Detroit	L 100–113	Nate Archibald (32)		15–14
30	December 9	@ Baltimore	L 112–120	Nate Archibald (29)		15–15
31	December 10	Atlanta	W 130–115	Nate Archibald (41)		16–15
32	December 12	Cleveland	W 100–99	Nate Archibald (41)	Omaha Civic Auditorium	17–15
33	December 15	Detroit	W 140–132 (OT)	Nate Archibald (41)	Omaha Civic Auditorium	18–15
34	December 17	@ Phoenix	L 102–112	Nate Archibald (26)		18–16
35	December 18	Portland	W 113–95	Nate Archibald (30)		19–16
36	December 19	@ Atlanta	L 102–119	Nate Archibald (33)		19–17
37	December 20	Seattle	W 121–110	Nate Archibald (35)	Omaha Civic Auditorium	20–17
38	December 22	Boston	L 90–118	Nate Archibald (32)		20–18
39	December 25	Milwaukee	L 99–104	Nate Archibald (20)		20–19
40	December 26	@ Chicago	L 103–117	Nate Archibald (34)		20–20
41	December 29	@ Los Angeles	L 92–121	Nate Archibald (21)		20–21
42	December 30	@ Golden State	L 107–113	Nate Archibald (45)		20–22

January

Game	Date	Team	Score	High points	Location Attendance	Record
43	January 2	@ Portland	L 87–104	Nate Archibald (29)		20–23
44	January 3	@ Seattle	L 100–107	Nate Archibald (29)		20–24
45	January 5	Detroit	L 100–103	Sam Lacey (28)		21–24
46	January 6	Phoenix	L 118–112	Nate Archibald (34)	Omaha Civic Auditorium	21–25
47	January 9	New York	L 115–116 (OT)	Nate Archibald (52)		21–26
48	January 10	Chicago	W 102–100	Nate Archibald (37)	Omaha Civic Auditorium	22–26
49	January 11	Golden State	W 109–108	Nate Archibald (42)		23–26
50	January 12	@ Milwaukee	L 98–117	Nate Archibald (19)		23–27
51	January 15	Philadelphia	W 135–108	Nate Archibald (30)		24–27
52	January 16	Seattle	L 122–125	Nate Archibald (48)		24–28
53	January 18	@ Phoenix	W 119–96	Nate Archibald (32)		25–28
54	January 21	@ Los Angeles	L 102–123	Nate Archibald (23)		25–29
55	January 25	@ Golden State	L 115–129	Nate Archibald (39)		25–30
56	January 27	@ Atlanta	L 126–129	Nate Archibald (52)		25–31

February

Game	Date	Team	Score	High points	Location Attendance	Record
57	February 1	Golden State	W 98–96	Nate Archibald (37)	Omaha Civic Auditorium	26–31
58	February 3	@ Portland	W 105–97	Nate Archibald (39)		27–31
59	February 4	@ Seattle	W 120–98	Nate Archibald (31)		28–31
60	February 6	@ Chicago	L 107–114	Nate Archibald (35)		28–32
61	February 7	Milwaukee	W 105–98	Nate Archibald (39)		29–32
62	February 9	@ Houston	W 121–116	Nate Archibald (37)		30–32
63	February 10	Chicago	L 101–102	Nate Archibald (42)		30–33
64	February 13	Houston	W 132–118	Nate Archibald (49)		31–33
65	February 14	Boston	L 101–104	Nate Archibald (34)	Omaha Civic Auditorium	31–34
66	February 17	@ Milwaukee	L 104–111	Nate Archibald (33)		31–35
67	February 18	@ Detroit	L 100–144	Matt Guokas (17)		31–36
68	February 20	@ Buffalo	L 106–113	Nate Williams (27)		31–37
69	February 22	Milwaukee	L 113–116 (OT)	Nate Archibald (43)	Omaha Civic Auditorium	31–38
70	February 25	Phoenix	L 109–111	Nate Archibald (33)		31–39
71	February 27	@ Los Angeles	W 107–103	Nate Archibald (30)		32–39
72	February 28	@ Phoenix	W 109–107	Nate Archibald (41)		33–39

March

Game	Date	Team	Score	High points	Location Attendance	Record
73	March 2	@ Golden State	L 112–117	Nate Archibald (34)		33–40
74	March 8	Baltimore	W 105–93	Nate Archibald (29)	Omaha Civic Auditorium	34–40
75	March 10	@ New York	L 102–125	Nate Archibald (25)		34–41
76	March 13	@ Baltimore	L 99–103	Nate Archibald (42)		34–42
77	March 16	@ Cleveland	L 99–114	Nate Archibald (36)		34–43
78	March 18	@ Boston	L 105–109	Nate Archibald (35)		34–44
79	March 19	Portland	W 106–105	Nate Archibald (37)	Omaha Civic Auditorium	35–44
80	March 20	Buffalo	W 119–115	Nate Archibald (44)		36–44
81	March 21	Los Angeles	L 118–124	Nate Williams (22)		36–45
82	March 24	@ Detroit	L 98–110	Matt Guokas (24)		36–46

== Awards and records ==
- Joe Axelson, NBA Executive of the Year Award
- Nate Archibald, All-NBA First Team
