= 1972–73 Seattle SuperSonics season =

NBA professional basketball team season

- Head coach: Tom Nissalke; Bucky Buckwalter
- General manager: Bob Houbregs
- Owners: Sam Schulman
- Arena: Seattle Center Coliseum

Results
- Record: 26–56 (.317)
- Place: Division: 4th (Pacific); Conference: 8th (Western)
- Playoff finish: Did not qualify
- Stats at Basketball Reference

Local media
- Television: KTNT-TV
- Radio: KOMO

The 1972–73 Seattle SuperSonics season was the 6th season of the Seattle SuperSonics in the National Basketball Association (NBA). The team finished the regular season in 6th place in the Western Conference with a 26–56 record, 21 wins behind the one obtained in their previous season. Head coach Tom Nissalke was fired by the team in January after a 13–32 start and was replaced by his assistant Bucky Buckwalter.

== Offseason ==
The offseason trade that sent player-coach Lenny Wilkens to the Cleveland Cavaliers was received with shock from fans and the player himself. The trade also sent Barry Clemens to the Cavaliers and brought All-Star Butch Beard to the Sonics.

The signing of free agent John Brisker cost the SuperSonics a $10,000 fine and the resignation of their 1973 first round draft pick to the Philadelphia 76ers for violation of league rules that prohibited the team to approach Brisker without contacting the Sixers, who selected him in a supplemental draft in 1969 and held the rights to the player. However, Seattle regained its first round pick after an appeal and the Sonics' second round selection was given to the 76ers.

=== Draft ===
Round	Pick	Player	Position	Nationality	College
1	7	Isaac Stallworth	G/F	United States	Kansas
2	18	Joby Wright	C/F	United States	Indiana
2	23	Brian Taylor	G	United States	Princeton
3	40	Jim Creighton	F	United States	Colorado
4	57	Joe Mackey	F	United States	USC
5	73	Gary Ladd	G	United States	Seattle
6	90	Ronald Thomas	PF	United States	Louisville
7	107	Jerry Dunn	F	United States	Western Kentucky
8	123	Willie Stoudamire	G	United States	Portland State
9	138	Dwight Holiday	G	United States	Hawaii
10	151	Dan Steward	G	United States	Washington State
11	162	Steve Turner	C	United States	Vanderbilt
12	171	Greg Daust	F	United States	UMSL
14	185	Cleveland Hill	F	United States	Nicholls State

== Roster ==
1972–73 Seattle SuperSonics roster
Players

Pos.	No.	Player	Height	Weight	DOB	From
G	21	Butch Beard	6 ft 3 in (1.91 m)	185 lb (84 kg)	1947–05–04	Louisville
G/F	42	John Brisker	6 ft 5 in (1.96 m)	210 lb (95 kg)	1947–06–15	Toledo
G	32	Fred Brown	6 ft 3 in (1.91 m)	182 lb (83 kg)	1948–08–07	Iowa
F/C	41	Pete Cross	6 ft 9 in (2.06 m)	230 lb (104 kg)	1948–03–28	San Francisco
G	12	Charles Dudley	6 ft 2 in (1.88 m)	180 lb (82 kg)	1950–03–05	Washington
F/C	31	Jim Fox	6 ft 10 in (2.08 m)	230 lb (104 kg)	1943–04–07	South Carolina
F/C	24	Spencer Haywood	6 ft 8 in (2.03 m)	225 lb (102 kg)	1949–04–22	Detroit Mercy
F/C	44	Jim McDaniels	6 ft 11 in (2.11 m)	228 lb (103 kg)	1948–04–02	Western Kentucky
F	40	Kennedy McIntosh	6 ft 7 in (2.01 m)	225 lb (102 kg)	1949–01–21	Eastern Michigan
G/F	10	Dick Snyder	6 ft 5 in (1.96 m)	207 lb (94 kg)	1944–02–01	West Virginia
G/F	15	Isaac Stallworth	6 ft 5 in (1.96 m)	190 lb (86 kg)	1950–01–18	Kansas
G	11	Lee Winfield	6 ft 2 in (1.88 m)	174 lb (79 kg)	1947–02–04	Providence
F/C	14	Joby Wright	6 ft 8 in (2.03 m)	220 lb (100 kg)	1950–09–05	Indiana

Coaches
Head coach
- Tom Nissalke (fired)
- Bucky Buckwalter (interim)

Legend
- (DP) Unsigned draft pick
- (FA) Free agent
- (S) Suspended
- Injured

Roster

== Standings ==
Pacific Division	W	L	PCT	GB	Home	Road	Neutral	Div
y-Los Angeles Lakers	60	22	.732	–	30–11	28–11	2–0	22–4
x-Golden State Warriors	47	35	.573	13	27–14	18–20	2–1	14–12
Phoenix Suns	38	44	.463	22	22–19	15–25	1–0	14–12
Seattle SuperSonics	26	56	.317	34	16–25	10–29	0–2	9–17
Portland Trail Blazers	21	61	.256	39	13–28	8–32	0–1	6–20

#	Western Conference			
#	Team	W	L	PCT
1	z-Milwaukee Bucks	60	22	.732
2	y-Los Angeles Lakers	60	22	.732
3	x-Chicago Bulls	51	31	.622
4	x-Golden State Warriors	47	35	.573
5	Detroit Pistons	40	42	.488
6	Phoenix Suns	38	44	.463
7	Kansas City–Omaha Kings	36	46	.439
8	Seattle SuperSonics	26	56	.317
9	Portland Trail Blazers	21	61	.256

- z – clinched division title
- y – clinched division title
- x – clinched playoff spot

== Game log ==
1972–73 game log
Total: 26–56 (Home: 16–25; Road: 10–29; Neutral: 0–2)
October: 4–5 (home: 2–3; road: 2–2)

Game	Date	Team	Score	High points	High rebounds	High assists	Location Attendance	Record
1	October 10	@ New York	L 89–113	John Brisker (16)			Madison Square Garden; 19,447	0–1
2	October 11	@ Philadelphia	W 105–100	Spencer Haywood (22)			The Spectrum; 6,257	1–1
3	October 13	@ Portland	W 92–84	Spencer Haywood (35)			Memorial Coliseum; 8,573	2–1
4	October 20	Golden State	L 92–101	Spencer Haywood (22)			Seattle Center Coliseum; 10,950	2–2
5	October 21	@ Phoenix	L 117–129	John Brisker (34)			Arizona Veterans Memorial Coliseum; 8,315	2–3
6	October 22	Portland	W 120–119 (OT)	John Brisker (30)			Seattle Center Coliseum; 6,925	3–3
7	October 25	Atlanta	L 115–118	Spencer Haywood (33)			Seattle Center Coliseum; 7,140	3–4
8	October 27	Phoenix	W 120–115	Dick Snyder (29)			Seattle Center Coliseum; 8,201	4–4
9	October 29	Chicago	L 94–95	Spencer Haywood (30)			Seattle Center Coliseum; 8,022	4–5

November : 4–13 (home: 3–5; road: 1–8)

Game	Date	Team	Score	High points	High rebounds	High assists	Location Attendance	Record
10	November 1	Detroit	L 106–116	John Brisker (33)			Seattle Center Coliseum; 6,005	4–6
11	November 3	New York	L 80–105	Spencer Haywood (18)			Seattle Center Coliseum; 10,031	4–7
12	November 5	Los Angeles	L 115–124	Spencer Haywood (30)			Seattle Center Coliseum; 11,250	4–8
13	November 8	@ Milwaukee	L 103–116	Spencer Haywood (29)			Milwaukee Arena; 7,378	4–9
14	November 10	Kansas City–Omaha	L 106–111	Spencer Haywood (38)			Seattle Center Coliseum; 8,156	4–10
15	November 12	Cleveland	L 107–113	Spencer Haywood (28)			Seattle Center Coliseum; 13,174	4–11
16	November 14	@ Chicago	L 80–97	Spencer Haywood (20)			Chicago Stadium; 7,894	4–12
17	November 15	@ Kansas City–Omaha	L 97–106	Spencer Haywood (27)			Municipal Auditorium; 4,364	4–13
18	November 17	Philadelphia	W 105–92	Spencer Haywood (29)			Seattle Center Coliseum; 7,762	5–13
19	November 18	@ Portland	W 102–100	Spencer Haywood (21)			Memorial Coliseum; 9,639	6–13
20	November 19	Buffalo	W 107–84	Spencer Haywood (26)			Seattle Center Coliseum; 6,587	7–13
21	November 21	@ Cleveland	L 88–98	Spencer Haywood (32)			Cleveland Arena; 2,864	7–14
22	November 22	@ Baltimore	L 90–112	Dick Snyder (21)			Baltimore Civic Center; 2,877	7–15
23	November 23	@ Atlanta	L 97–110	Spencer Haywood (29)			Omni Coliseum; 6,523	7–16
24	November 25	@ Houston	L 109–114	Spencer Haywood (38)			Hofheinz Pavilion; 2,912	7–17
25	November 26	Detroit	W 103–96	Spencer Haywood (39)			Seattle Center Coliseum; 7,980	8–17
26	November 29	@ Boston	L 98–120	Spencer Haywood (29)			Boston Garden; 5,263	8–18

December : 4–11 (home: 3–3; road: 1–8)

Game	Date	Team	Score	High points	High rebounds	High assists	Location Attendance	Record
27	December 1	@ Buffalo	L 90–93	Spencer Haywood, Dick Snyder (15)			Seattle Center Coliseum; 16,107	8–19
28	December 2	@ Chicago	L 80–89	Spencer Haywood (26)			Chicago Stadium; 8,030	8–20
29	December 3	@ Cleveland	L 103–105 (OT)	Spencer Haywood (29)			Cleveland Arena; 2,957	8–21
30	December 6	Milwaukee	W 95–91	Spencer Haywood (32)			Seattle Center Coliseum; 8,953	9–21
31	December 8	@ Los Angeles	L 100–119	Spencer Haywood (26)			The Forum; 14,618	9–22
32	December 10	Phoenix	W 110–102	Spencer Haywood (32)			Seattle Center Coliseum; 10,628	10–22
33	December 13	Milwaukee	L 103–104 (OT)	Spencer Haywood (38)			Seattle Center Coliseum; 8,036	10–23
34	December 15	Portland	L 95–96	Spencer Haywood (37)			Seattle Center Coliseum; 7,812	10–24
35	December 17	Boston	L 98–123	Spencer Haywood (34)			Seattle Center Coliseum; 10,633	10–25
36	December 19	@ Milwaukee	L 77–121	John Brisker (15)			Milwaukee Arena; 7,407	10–26
37	December 20	@ Kansas City–Omaha	L 110–121	Isaac Stallworth (32)			Omaha, NE; 4,067	10–27
38	December 22	@ Detroit	L 97–109	Fred Brown (21)			Cobo Arena; 3,779	10–28
39	December 25	@ Portland	L 113–116	Spencer Haywood (35)			Memorial Coliseum; 6,818	10–29
40	December 26	@ Golden State	W 97–95	Spencer Haywood (42)			Oakland–Alameda County Coliseum Arena; 3,605	11–29
41	December 29	Cleveland	W 99–91	Spencer Haywood (31)			Seattle Center Coliseum; 12,738	12–29

January : 5–9 (home: 3–5; road: 2–4)

Game	Date	Team	Score	High points	High rebounds	High assists	Location Attendance	Record
42	January 1	Los Angeles	L 103–108	Spencer Haywood (28)			Seattle Center Coliseum; 8,751	12–30
43	January 3	Kansas City–Omaha	W 107–100	Spencer Haywood (51)			Seattle Center Coliseum; 10,266	13–30
44	January 5	Golden State	L 96–128	Fred Brown (20)			Seattle Center Coliseum; 9,087	13–31
45	January 7	Philadelphia	L 82–85	Spencer Haywood (18)			Seattle Center Coliseum; 12,150	13–32
46	January 10	Baltimore	L 86–98	Spencer Haywood (17)			Seattle Center Coliseum; 7,570	13–33
47	January 12	Detroit	W 113–104	Spencer Haywood (36)			Seattle Center Coliseum; 8,420	14–33
48	January 14	New York Knicks	L 84–86	Spencer Haywood (18)			Seattle Center Coliseum; 11,538	14–34
49	January 16	@ Kansas City–Omaha	W 125–122	Jim Fox, Spencer Haywood (23)			Municipal Auditorium; 4,468	15–34
50	January 17	@ Detroit	W 106–104	Spencer Haywood (28)			Cobo Arena; 2,630	16–34
51	January 19	@ Boston	L 104–124	Spencer Haywood (25)			Boston Garden; 14,190	16–35
52	January 20	Baltimore	L 106–126	Spencer Haywood (28)			College Park, MD; 12,084	16–36
53	January 25	@ Phoenix	L 109–112	Spencer Haywood (27)			Arizona Veterans Memorial Coliseum; 5,701	16–37
54	January 28	@ Los Angeles	L 94–130	Spencer Haywood (29)			The Forum; 17,107	16–38
55	January 31	Houston	W 118–109	Spencer Haywood (37)			Seattle Center Coliseum; 6,257	17–38

February : 4–11 (home: 3–5; road: 1–6)

Game	Date	Team	Score	High points	High rebounds	High assists	Location Attendance	Record
56	February 2	Chicago	W 118–104	John Brisker (24)			Seattle Center Coliseum; 8,818	18–38
57	February 3	@ Golden State	L 101–123	Spencer Haywood (34)			Oakland–Alameda County Coliseum Arena; 3,261	18–39
58	February 4	Kansas City–Omaha	L 98–120	Spencer Haywood (27)			Seattle Center Coliseum; 11,140	18–40
59	February 6	@ Portland	W 118–117	Spencer Haywood (41)			Memorial Coliseum; 4,755	19–40
60	February 8	@ Phoenix	L 112–125	Spencer Haywood (31)			Arizona Veterans Memorial Coliseum; 7,084	19–41
61	February 11	Buffalo	L 125–128	Spencer Haywood (40)			Seattle Center Coliseum; 6,960	19–42
62	February 13	@ Los Angeles	L 98–101	Spencer Haywood (35)			The Forum; 13,127	19–43
63	February 14	Baltimore	L 106–107	Spencer Haywood (37)			Seattle Center Coliseum; 6,034	19–44
64	February 16	Golden State	W 114–108 (OT)	Fred Brown (33)			Seattle Center Coliseum; 9,070	20–44
65	February 18	Boston	L 105–106	Spencer Haywood (32)			Seattle Center Coliseum; 12,905	20–45
66	February 21	Houston	L 107–139	Spencer Haywood (27)			San Antonio, TX; 4,179	20–46
67	February 23	Atlanta	W 124–120	Spencer Haywood (29)			Seattle Center Coliseum; 11,735	21–46
68	February 25	Chicago	L 85–88	Spencer Haywood (29)			Seattle Center Coliseum; 10,103	21–47
69	February 27	@ Atlanta	L 130–131	Spencer Haywood (33)			Omni Coliseum; 8,295	21–48
70	February 28	@ Milwaukee	L 110–124	Spencer Haywood (36)			Milwaukee Arena; 10,292	21–49

March : 5–9 (home: 2–4; road: 3–5)

Game	Date	Team	Score	High points	High rebounds	High assists	Location Attendance	Record
71	March 2	@ Buffalo	W 139–120	Spencer Haywood (35)			Seattle Center Coliseum; 5,563	22–49
72	March 3	@ Detroit	W 115–113	Spencer Haywood (33)			Cobo Arena; 5,044	23–49
73	March 6	@ New York	L 94–106	Spencer Haywood (25)			Madison Square Garden; 19,644	23–50
74	March 10	@ Philadelphia	W 106–96	Spencer Haywood (27)			The Spectrum; 4,942	24–50
75	March 13	@ Chicago	L 89–104	Spencer Haywood (31)			Chicago Stadium; 9,270	24–51
76	March 16	Golden State	W 116–106	Spencer Haywood (35)			Seattle Center Coliseum; 10,512	25–51
77	March 18	Houston	W 121–112	Spencer Haywood (38)			Seattle Center Coliseum; 8,956	26–51
78	March 20	@ Golden State	L 106–114	Spencer Haywood (39)			Oakland–Alameda County Coliseum Arena; 2,992	26–52
79	March 21	Milwaukee	L 96–119	Spencer Haywood (29)			Seattle Center Coliseum; 11,407	26–53
80	March 23	Portland	L 112–118	Kennedy McIntosh (25)			Seattle Center Coliseum; 10,305	26–54
81	March 25	Los Angeles	L 93–109	Spencer Haywood (25)			Seattle Center Coliseum; 13,180	26–55
82	March 28	Phoenix	L 125–127	John Brisker (39)			Seattle Center Coliseum; 11,246	26–56

1972–73 season schedule

== Player statistics ==
Legend
GP	Games played	GS	Games started	MPG	Minutes per game
FG%	Field-goal percentage	3P%	3-point field-goal percentage	FT%	Free-throw percentage
RPG	Rebounds per game	APG	Assists per game	SPG	Steals per game
BPG	Blocks per game	PPG	Points per game

Player	GP	GS	MPG	FG%	3FG%	FT%	RPG	APG	SPG	BPG	PPG
Butch Beard	73	–	19.2	.439	–	.714	2.4	3.4	–	–	6.6
John Brisker	70	–	23.3	.435	–	.822	4.6	2.1	–	–	12.8
Fred Brown	79	–	29.4	.455	–	.818	4.0	5.5	–	–	13.5
Pete Cross	26	–	5.1	.286	–	.444	2.2	.4	–	–	.8
Charles Dudley	12	–	8.3	.435	–	.875	.5	1.3	–	–	2.8
Jim Fox	74	–	33.0	.515	–	.808	11.2	2.4	–	–	11.4
Spencer Haywood	77	–	42.3	.476	–	.839	12.9	2.5	–	–	29.2
Gar Heard	3	–	5.7	.444	–	1.000	2.0	.7	–	–	3.0
Jim McDaniels	68	–	16.1	.399	–	.700	5.1	1.1	–	–	5.6
Kennedy McIntosh	56	–	19.7	.326	–	.615	4.0	.9	–	–	4.5
Dick Snyder	82	–	37.3	.463	–	.861	3.9	3.8	–	–	13.8
Isaac Stallworth	77	–	15.9	.379	–	.754	2.9	.8	–	–	6.3
Lee Winfield	53	–	20.0	.431	–	.574	2.4	3.5	–	–	6.6
Joby Wright	77	–	12.1	.478	–	.416	2.8	.5	–	–	3.9

== Awards and records ==
- Spencer Haywood was selected to the All-NBA First Team for the second time.

== Transactions ==
=== Overview ===
Players Added	Players Lost
Via draft: Isaac Stallworth; Joby Wright; Via trade: Butch Beard; Kennedy McIntosh; Via free agency: John Brisker; Charles Dudley	Via trade: Barry Clemens; Pete Cross (later claimed on waivers); Gar Heard; Don Smith; Lenny Wilkens

=== Trades ===
August 23, 1972	To Seattle SuperSonics	To Cleveland Cavaliers
August 23, 1972	Butch Beard	Lenny Wilkens; Barry Clemens
September 18, 1972	To Seattle SuperSonics	To Houston Rockets
September 18, 1972	Cash considerations	Don Smith
October 20, 1972	To Seattle SuperSonics	To Chicago Bulls
October 20, 1972	Kennedy McIntosh	Gar Heard; 1973 third round pick
