= 1972–73 Philadelphia 76ers season =

Season of National Basketball Association team the Philadelphia 76ers

- Head coach: Roy Rubin, Kevin Loughery
- Owners: Irv Kosloff
- Arena: The Spectrum

Results
- Record: 9–73 (.110)
- Place: Division: 4th (Atlantic); Conference: 8th (Eastern)
- Playoff finish: Did not qualify
- Stats at Basketball Reference

Local media
- Television: WTAF-TV
- Radio: WCAU

The 1972–73 Philadelphia 76ers season was their 24th season in the NBA and tenth in Philadelphia. Coming off a 30–52 record in the previous season, the 76ers lost their first 15 games of the season and a few months later, went on a then-record 20-game losing streak in a single season (now since broken by the 2023–24 Detroit Pistons).

Their record following the 20 game losing streak was 4–58, and the team at that point had just lost 34 of 35 games. The 76ers finished the season with a 9–73 record, earning the nickname from the skeptical Philadelphia media of the "Nine and 73-ers." The 76ers finished an NBA-record 59 games behind the Atlantic Division champion Boston Celtics. These 9 wins by this 1972–73 squad is tied for the 4th fewest in NBA history (behind only the 6 games won by the Providence Steamrollers in the 48-game 1947–48 BAA season back when the NBA was named the Basketball Association of America, the 7 games won by the Charlotte Bobcats in the lockout-shortened 66-game 2011–12 season and the 8 games won by the Vancouver Grizzlies in the lockout-shortened 50-game 1998–99 season, as well as tying the Los Angeles Clippers in the same lockout-shortened 50-game 1998–99 season).

The 73 losses, although threatened many times (including by the 2015–16 Sixers, who themselves lost 72 that season), remains the all-time low-water mark for any NBA franchise in an 82-game non-lockout season. The 76ers .110 winning percentage was the all-time worst mark in the NBA until the 2011–12 Charlotte Bobcats finished with a .106 winning percentage, whilst their −12.1 points per game point differential has been underdone only by the 2011–12 Bobcats (−13.9 points per game) and the 1992–93 Dallas Mavericks (−15.2 points per game). Only six seasons earlier, the 76ers had set the NBA record for most wins in a season and the highest winning percentage.

== Offseason ==
The Sixers ownership offered the head coaching job to Marquette University head coach Al McGuire, and former University of Kentucky head coach Adolph Rupp, who was seventy years old at the time. Both refused the job. Only Hal Greer remained on the roster from the 1966–1967 NBA Championship Team. The 1972–73 season would be his last in the NBA.

=== 1972 NBA draft ===
Round	Pick	Player	Position	Nationality	School/Club team
1	5	Fred Boyd	(G)	United States	Oregon State
3		Charlie Tharpe		United States	Belhaven
4		Marshall Wingate		United States	Niagara
5		Joe Bynes		United States	Arkansas AM&N
6		John Glover		United States	Wiley
7		Curtis Pritchett		United States	St. Augustine
8		Jim Kopp		United States	Rockhurst
9		Rod Murray		United States	Cal State-Los Angeles
10		Gary Watson		United States	Wisconsin

== Roster ==
Philadelphia 76ers roster
Players

Pos.	No.	Player	Height	Weight	DOB	From
G	11	Freddie Boyd	6 ft 2 in (1.88 m)	180 lb (82 kg)	1950–06–13	Oregon State
G	3	Fred Carter	6 ft 3 in (1.91 m)	185 lb (84 kg)	1945–02–14	Mount St. Mary's
F	14	LeRoy Ellis	6 ft 10 in (2.08 m)	210 lb (95 kg)	1940–03–10	St. John's
F	25	Luther Green	6 ft 7 in (2.01 m)	190 lb (86 kg)	1946–11–13	LIU Brooklyn
G	15	Hal Greer	6 ft 2 in (1.88 m)	175 lb (79 kg)	1936–06–26	Marshall
G	42	Jeff Halliburton	6 ft 5 in (1.96 m)	193 lb (88 kg)	1949–07–03	Drake
C	26	Manny Leaks	6 ft 8 in (2.03 m)	225 lb (102 kg)	1945–11–27	Niagara
G	22	Kevin Loughery	6 ft 3 in (1.91 m)	190 lb (86 kg)	1940–03–28	St. John's
F	34	Don May	6 ft 4 in (1.93 m)	200 lb (91 kg)	1946–01–03	Dayton
G	36	Mike Price	6 ft 3 in (1.91 m)	200 lb (91 kg)	1948–09–11	Illinois
F	35	Dave Sorenson	6 ft 8 in (2.03 m)	225 lb (102 kg)	1948–07–08	Ohio State
F	31	John Q. Trapp	6 ft 7 in (2.01 m)	210 lb (95 kg)	1945–10–02	UNLV
F	5	Tom Van Arsdale	6 ft 5 in (1.96 m)	202 lb (92 kg)	1943–02–22	Indiana

Coaches
Head coach
- Kevin Loughery

Legend
- (DP) Unsigned draft pick
- (FA) Free agent
- (S) Suspended
- Injured

Roster

== Season ==
By the start of the 1972–73 season, most of the core of the 76ers 1966-67 championship team was gone. In the 1972 offseason, coach Jack Ramsay left to coach the Buffalo Braves, while a court order allowed All-Star forward Billy Cunningham to bolt to the ABA. Only Hal Greer, who was 36 years old, remained. Poor trades and draft selections over the years left the team with only a few quality players.

The 76ers finished the 1971–72 season with a 30–52 record and could not find a coach for the upcoming season. In desperation, management placed an ad in The Philadelphia Inquirer for a head coach. A friend of Irv Kosloff recommended Roy Rubin, the head coach at LIU Brooklyn Blackbirds. While Rubin had 11 years coaching in college basketball, he had no professional or major college experience to draw on.

The Sixers, whose roster included the likes of Manny Leaks, Jeff Halliburton, Mike Price, John Q. Trapp and Dave Sorenson, started the season 0–15 and later lost 20 consecutive games. Players criticized Rubin for his sloppy practices and the lack of meaningful comments during time-outs and breaks. Dave Wohl, who was traded to Portland, called Rubin a ‘con man’. With the club record at 4–47, Rubin was fired and replaced by Sixers player Kevin Loughery. The team's performance improved slightly, going 5–26 with a .161 winning percentage, compared with Rubin's .078 mark.

In their 1st win of the season (a 114–112 victory over Houston), coach Rubin actually injured himself by pulling a leg muscle. The top statistical leaders were Fred Carter (who led the team with 20 points per game), Tom Van Arsdale (with 17.7 points per game), and Leroy Ellis (with 13.7 points and 10.8 rebounds per game).

As bad as their season was, it would have been far worse if not for a 5–2 run the team put together in the last two weeks of February 1973. By Valentine's Day 1973 the 76ers' record stood at 4–58 or a .065 winning percentage which actually put on a pace to finish with an unimaginable 5–77 record. However, the team surprisingly won 5 of their next 7 games against some of the best competition in the league. 3 of those 5 wins came against teams that would eventually win fifty or more games that year – Baltimore, the 60-win Milwaukee Bucks and the 57–25 eventual NBA Champion New York Knicks. They improved to 9–60 and actually doubled their winning percentage (up from .065 to .130 during that run.) However, the 76ers lost their remaining 13 games to finish 9–73. Before the 1972–73 season the previous mark for fewest wins in an 82-game schedule was 15, and no subsequent NBA team won fewer than 22 until the 1980 Detroit Pistons who finished 16–66.

=== Season standings ===
Atlantic Division	W	L	PCT	GB	Home	Road	Neutral	Div
y-Boston Celtics	68	14	.829	–	33–6	32–8	3–0	18–4
x-New York Knicks	57	25	.695	11	35–6	21–18	1–1	16–6
Buffalo Braves	21	61	.256	47	14–27	6–31	1–3	8–14
Philadelphia 76ers	9	73	.110	59	5–26	2–36	2–11	2–20

#	Eastern Conference			
#	Team	W	L	PCT
1	z-Boston Celtics	68	14	.829
2	x-New York Knicks	57	25	.695
3	y-Baltimore Bullets	52	30	.634
4	x-Atlanta Hawks	46	36	.561
5	Houston Rockets	33	49	.402
6	Cleveland Cavaliers	32	50	.390
7	Buffalo Braves	21	61	.256
8	Philadelphia 76ers	9	73	.110

=== Anatomy of a demise ===
Two and a half months after Philadelphia's collapse against the Boston Celtics in the 1968 NBA Playoffs, Wilt Chamberlain was traded to the Los Angeles Lakers. In return, the Sixers received Darrall Imhoff, Archie Clark and Jerry Chambers.

The background of the deal can be traced back to Sixers owners Ike Richman and Irv Kosloff. Chamberlain indicated that Richman promised him part ownership of the club, but Richman died before the deal was completed. When Kosloff became sole owner, he refused to honor the agreement Chamberlain had reached with Richman. This infuriated Chamberlain, and he contemplated retirement or bolting to the ABA. Chamberlain then expressed a desire to play in Los Angeles and suggested a trade. On paper, the deal made some sense from the Sixers' perspective, since general manager Jack Ramsay was not willing to risk letting Chamberlain get away for nothing. In the long run, however, the Sixers didn't get nearly enough in return.

After the 1967–68 season, head coach Alex Hannum bolted to the ABA, and Ramsay named himself head coach. He decided that Clark, Imhoff and Chambers would be part of a smaller, quicker, fast-breaking team. This plan had never truly materialized. Imhoff spent only 2 seasons with the 76ers, Clark spent three, while Chambers never played for Philadelphia after spending two years in the military before being traded. Luke Jackson, Chamberlain's intended successor, suffered a major injury in the 1968–69 season and was never the same player after that. Chet Walker was dealt to the Chicago Bulls for Jim Washington, a role player.

Another contributing factor to the poor season was Philadelphia's first-round draft choices from 1967 through 1972. Selections such as Craig Raymond, Shaler Halimon, Bud Ogden, Harris Ahmad, Al Henry, Dana Lewis and Fred Boyd made no impact with the club, while Philadelphia passed on drafting future stars such as Nate Archibald and Calvin Murphy.

Ramsay did coax 55 victories out of the 1st 76ers team he coached in 1968–69. That number dipped into the 40s for the next 2 seasons, and sunk even further to 30 in 1971–72—the 1st time they had missed the playoffs in franchise history (dating back to their tenure as the Syracuse Nationals).

=== Game log ===
1972–73 Game Log
Total: 9–73 (Home: 5–26; Road: 2–36; Neutral: 2–11)
October: 0–9 (Home: 0–4; Road: 0–5; Neutral: 0–0)

Game	Date	Opponent	Score	Location	Record
1	October 10	@ Chicago Bulls	89–95	Chicago Stadium	0–1
2	October 11	Seattle SuperSonics	100–105	Philadelphia Spectrum	0–2
3	October 13	Buffalo Braves	101–104	Philadelphia Spectrum	0–3
4	October 17	@ Buffalo Braves	114–122	Buffalo Memorial Auditorium	0–4
5	October 21	@ New York Knicks	88–111	Madison Square Garden	0–5
6	October 23	@ Boston Celtics	85–105	Boston Garden	0–6
7	October 25	Cleveland Cavaliers	108–113	Philadelphia Spectrum	0–7
8	October 28	Milwaukee Bucks	92–96	Philadelphia Spectrum	0–8
9	October 31	@ Cleveland Cavaliers	116–126	Cleveland Arena	0–9

November: 2–13 (Home: 0–5; Road: 1–7; Neutral: 1–1)

Game	Date	Opponent	Score	Location	Record
10	November 1	Houston Rockets	104–108	Philadelphia Spectrum	0–10
11	November 3	Kansas City–Omaha Kings	101–114	Philadelphia Spectrum	0–11
12	November 4	@ Atlanta Hawks	120–128	Omni Coliseum	0–12
13	November 5	@ Milwaukee Bucks	113–131	Milwaukee Arena	0–13
14	November 8	@ Kansas City–Omaha Kings	107–125	Omaha Civic Auditorium	0–14
15	November 10	New York Knicks	106–125	Philadelphia Spectrum	0–15
16	November 11	N Houston Rockets	114–112	(San Antonio, Texas)	1–15
17	November 12	@ Phoenix Suns	108–119	Arizona Veterans Memorial Coliseum	1–16
18	November 16	@ Golden State Warriors	106–128	Oakland Arena	1–17
19	November 17	@ Seattle SuperSonics	92–105	Seattle Center Coliseum	1–18
20	November 19	@ Los Angeles Lakers	95–135	The Forum	1–19
21	November 24	N Buffalo Braves	96–105	(Hershey, Pennsylvania)	1–20
22	November 25	Portland Trail Blazers	106–117	Philadelphia Spectrum	1–21
23	November 28	@ Buffalo Braves	101–94	Buffalo Memorial Auditorium	2–21
24	November 29	New York Knicks	91–139	Philadelphia Spectrum	2–22

December: 1–13 (Home: 1–4; Road: 0–6; Neutral: 0–3)

Game	Date	Opponent	Score	Location	Record
25	December 1	Boston Celtics	99–105	Philadelphia Spectrum	2–23
26	December 2	@ Boston Celtics	120–131	Philadelphia Spectrum	2–24
27	December 6	Kansas City–Omaha Kings	122–117	Philadelphia Spectrum	3–24
28	December 7	N Phoenix Suns	102–117	(Pittsburgh, Pennsylvania)	3–25
29	December 8	Chicago Bulls	102–118	Philadelphia Spectrum	3–26
30	December 9	@ New York Knicks	109–120	Madison Square Garden	3–27
31	December 12	@ Baltimore Bullets	102–123	Baltimore Civic Center	3–28
32	December 13	Los Angeles Lakers	90–128	Philadelphia Spectrum	3–29
33	December 16	Buffalo Braves	103–126	Philadelphia Spectrum	3–30
34	December 20	@ Detroit Pistons	113–141	Cobo Hall	3–31
35	December 22	@ Houston Rockets	103–116	Hofheinz Pavilion	3–32
36	December 23	@ Atlanta Hawks	112–124	Omni Coliseum	3–33
37	December 27	N Atlanta Hawks	120–121	(Pittsburgh, Pennsylvania)	3–34
38	December 30	N Boston Celtics	107–117	(Providence, Rhode Island)	3–35

January: 1–16 (Home: 0–5; Road: 1–9; Neutral: 0–2)

Game	Date	Opponent	Score	Location	Record
39	January 2	@ Buffalo Braves	110–114	Buffalo Memorial Auditorium	3–36
40	January 5	@ Portland Trail Blazers	102–135	Memorial Coliseum	3–37
41	January 6	@ Golden State Warriors	79–111	Oakland Arena	3–38
42	January 7	@ Seattle SuperSonics	85–82	Seattle Center Coliseum	4–38
43	January 9	@ Chicago Bulls	110–126	Chicago Stadium	4–39
44	January 10	Los Angeles Lakers	96–120	Philadelphia Spectrum	4–40
45	January 12	N Cleveland Cavaliers	109–113	(Pittsburgh, Pennsylvania)	4–41
46	January 13	Boston Celtics	95–111	Philadelphia Spectrum	4–42
47	January 15	@ Kansas City–Omaha Kings	108–135	Municipal Auditorium	4–43
48	January 16	@ Milwaukee Bucks	92–108	Milwaukee Arena	4–44
49	January 17	Atlanta Hawks	105–122	Philadelphia Spectrum	4–45
50	January 19	N Baltimore Bullets	94–110	(Hershey, Pennsylvania)	4–46
51	January 21	@ Baltimore Bullets	97–108	Baltimore Civic Center	4–47
52	January 26	@ Cleveland Cavaliers	100–105	Cleveland Arena	4–48
53	January 28	Buffalo Braves	96–101	Philadelphia Spectrum	4–49
54	January 30	@ Buffalo Braves	104–105	Buffalo Memorial Auditorium	4–50
55	January 31	Golden State Warriors	115–131	Philadelphia Spectrum	4–51

February: 5–9 (Home: 4–1; Road: 0–6; Neutral: 1–2)

Game	Date	Opponent	Score	Location	Record
56	February 2	@ Detroit Pistons	104–114	Cobo Hall	4–52
57	February 3	Boston Celtics	100–104	Philadelphia Spectrum	4–53
58	February 4	@ Boston Celtics	115–123	Boston Garden	4–54
59	February 6	N Houston Rockets	117–123	(San Antonio, Texas)	4–55
60	February 9	@ Portland Trail Blazers	105–116	Memorial Coliseum	4–56
61	February 10	@ Phoenix Suns	121–126	Arizona Veterans Memorial Coliseum	4–57
62	February 11	@ Los Angeles Lakers	90–108	The Forum	4–58
63	February 14	Milwaukee Bucks	106–104	Philadelphia Spectrum	5–58
64	February 16	Detroit Pistons	119–106	Philadelphia Spectrum	6–58
65	February 17	@ New York Knicks	89–107	Madison Square Garden	6–59
66	February 18	New York Knicks	114–98	Philadelphia Spectrum	7–59
67	February 23	N Houston Rockets	116–138	(Hershey, Pennsylvania)	7–60
68	February 25	N Portland Trail Blazers	115–111	(Pittsburgh, Pennsylvania)	8–60
69	February 28	Baltimore Bullets	102–96	Philadelphia Spectrum	9–60

March: 0–13 (Home: 0–7; Road: 0–3; Neutral: 0–3)

Game	Date	Opponent	Score	Location	Record
70	March 2	Atlanta Hawks	107–130	Philadelphia Spectrum	9–61
71	March 4	@ Atlanta Hawks	130–138	Omni Coliseum	9–62
72	March 7	New York Knicks	94–120	Philadelphia Spectrum	9–63
73	March 9	N Chicago Bulls	84–104	(Hershey, Pennsylvania)	9–64
74	March 10	Seattle SuperSonics	96–106	Philadelphia Spectrum	9–65
75	March 11	N Golden State Warriors	93–97	(Pittsburgh, Pennsylvania)	9–66
76	March 14	Phoenix Suns	114–120	Philadelphia Spectrum	9–67
77	March 17	Baltimore Bullets	115–120	Philadelphia Spectrum	9–68
78	March 18	@ Baltimore Bullets	118–129	Baltimore Civic Center	9–69
79	March 20	@ Cleveland Cavaliers	105–131	Cleveland Arena	9–70
80	March 21	Cleveland Cavaliers	109–112	Philadelphia Spectrum	9–71
81	March 23	Houston Rockets	112–132	Philadelphia Spectrum	9–72
82	March 25	N Detroit Pistons	96–115	(Pittsburgh, Pennsylvania)	9–73

1972–73 Schedule

== Awards and records ==
- Fred Boyd, NBA All-Rookie Team First Team
