= Paul Stovall =

American basketball player, small forward

Personal information
- Born: August 16, 1948 Los Angeles, California, U.S.
- Died: January 9, 1978 (aged 29) San Diego, California, U.S.
- Listed height: 6 ft 4 in (1.93 m)
- Listed weight: 215 lb (98 kg)

Career information
- College: Pratt CC (1968–1970); Arizona State (1970–1972)
- NBA draft: 1972: 2nd round, 22nd overall pick
- Drafted by: Los Angeles Lakers
- Playing career: 1972–1974
- Position: Small forward
- Number: 23, 22

Career history
- 1972–1973: Phoenix Suns
- 1973–1974: San Diego Conquistadors

Career highlights
- First-team All-WAC (1972); Second-team All-WAC (1971)
- Stats at NBA.com
- Stats at Basketball Reference

Paul L. Stovall (August 16, 1948 – January 9, 1978) was an American professional basketball player in the National Basketball Association (NBA) for the Phoenix Suns. He also was a member of the San Diego Conquistadors in the American Basketball Association (ABA). He was recruited and played basketball for Pratt Community Junior College straight out of prison. A small forward, he played college basketball for the Arizona State Sun Devils.

== Early years ==
Stovall attended Wichita North High School in Wichita, Kansas, but did not play on the basketball team and attended less than half of his classes. His truancy meant that he spent considerable time at the Lake Afton Boys' Ranch detention home. In 1964, Stovall dropped out of school and his criminal record mounted with charges including larceny, assault and statutory rape.

In 1965, Stovall was sent to the Kansas State Industrial Reformatory where he spent the next three years. He earned a high school diploma through correspondence. He participated in a weightlifting program that helped him put on weight and he also grew from 5 ft 6 in (1.68 m) to 6 ft 4 in (1.93 m). Stovall also played for the reformatory's basketball team known as the Red Eagles which played local city and industrial teams. On one occasion, the team competed against Pratt Community College, where head coach Jim Douglas had a chance to scout him.

== College career ==
Stovall enrolled at Pratt Community College. He appeared in 58 games, averaging 30.3 points for a total of 1,758 points and also registered 22.2 rebounds per game for a total of 1,288 rebounds, while finishing as the eighth-leading scorer and second-leading rebounder in junior-college basketball history. He was named to the 1969–70 All-American Junior College First Team, along with among others fellow future NBA player Steve Bracey.

He transferred to Arizona State University at the end of his sophomore season. As a senior, he averaged 21.8 points (seventh in school history). He scored a career high against the University of New Mexico. He posted a career high 21 rebounds against the University of Utah.

Stovall averaged 19 points and 12.4 rebounds in two seasons. He led his teams in scoring, rebounding and field goal percentage during both seasons. He graduated ranked first all-time among two-year players in school history in scoring average (19 points), rebounding average (12.4) and total rebounds (647).

In 2006, he was inducted into the Arizona State University Sports Hall of Fame. In 2013, he was inducted into the Wichita Sports Hall of Fame.

== Professional career ==
=== Phoenix Suns ===
Stovall was selected by the Los Angeles Lakers in the 2nd round (22nd overall) of the 1972 NBA draft. On September 19, 1972, he was traded to the Phoenix Suns, in exchange for a 1974 2nd round draft pick (#22-Truck Robinson) and a future draft choice.

Stovall appeared in 25 games. On September 14, 1973, he was waived by the Phoenix Suns.

=== San Diego Conquistadors ===
In 1973, he signed with the San Diego Conquistadors in the American Basketball Association. He appeared in 13 games.

He averaged 4.6 points per game in his career, competing for the Phoenix Suns and San Diego Conquistadors.

== Legal troubles ==
In December 1973, Stovall was sentenced to three years imprisonment for cashing forged money orders which were stolen in a Kansas armed robbery. His sentence was reduced to six months.

In September 1975, Stovall was sentenced to five years imprisonment for aggravated battery on a Phoenix police officer and another five years for distribution of cocaine; the terms were to run concurrently. He was released early and lived in San Diego at the time of his death.

== Death ==
On January 9, 1978, Stovall was killed in a motorcycle crash in San Diego, California, after he lost control and collided with at least two cars. He was pronounced dead at the scene.

== Career statistics ==
Legend
GP	Games played	GS	Games started	MPG	Minutes per game
FG%	Field goal percentage	3P%	3-point field goal percentage	FT%	Free throw percentage
RPG	Rebounds per game	APG	Assists per game	SPG	Steals per game
BPG	Blocks per game	PPG	Points per game	**Bold**	Career high

=== NBA/ABA ===
==== Regular season ====
Year	Team	GP	MPG	FG%	3P%	FT%	RPG	APG	SPG	BPG	PPG
1972–73	Phoenix (NBA)	**25**	8.4	.342		.632	2.4	.5			3.0
1973–74	San Diego (ABA)	13	**14.9**	**.493**	–	**.636**	**4.5**	**.9**	.3	.5	**7.7**
Career (overall)		38	10.7	.416	–	.634	3.1	.7	.3	.5	4.6
