= Harold Fox (basketball) =

American basketball player (born 1949)

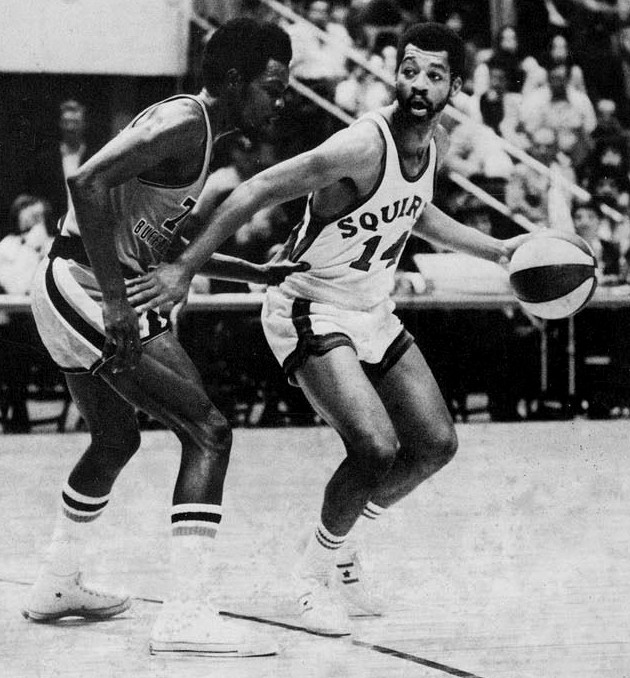
- Fox (left) guarding Roland Taylor (right)

Personal information
- Born: August 29, 1949 (age 77) Hyattsville, Maryland, U.S.
- Listed height: 6 ft 2 in (1.88 m)
- Listed weight: 175 lb (79 kg)

Career information
- High school: Northwestern (Hyattsville, Maryland)
- College: Eastern Florida State (1968–1970); Jacksonville (1970–1972)
- NBA draft: 1972: 2nd round, 15th overall pick
- Drafted by: Buffalo Braves
- Position: Point guard
- Number: 7, 44

Career history
- 1972: Buffalo Braves
- 1972–1973: Scranton Apollos

Career highlights
- Third-team NJCAA All-American (1969)
- Stats at NBA.com
- Stats at Basketball Reference

Harold Fox (born August 29, 1949) is an American former professional basketball player who played in the National Basketball Association (NBA) for the Buffalo Braves.

== High school career ==
As a high school player at Northwestern High School in Hyattsville, Prince George's County, Maryland, Fox was one of the best high school players to ever come out of the Washington metro area. As a junior guard, he helped lead the Wildcats to a Maryland State Championship with Captain Mark Christian, a dominant center. As a senior guard, Fox was a First Team All-Metropolitan selection and despite the graduation of Christian, led Northwestern to a second-in-a-row Maryland State Basketball Championship his senior season. He was also named the 1968 High School Player of the Year in the Washington Metro Area. Later he suffered a serious finger injury on his right hand, that required surgery, when a classroom door closed on it but was able to make full recovery.

== College career ==
In his freshman year of college, Fox played for Brevard Community College (now Eastern Florida State College) where he averaged 27.7 points per game in 29 appearances and was a NJCAA Third Team All-American. After his sophomore year, Fox transferred to Jacksonville University. In his two seasons at Jacksonville, Fox averaged 19.9 points per game and 6.5 assists per game.

== Professional career ==
Fox was drafted with the third pick in the second round of the 1972 NBA draft. He played in 10 games for the Buffalo Braves in the 1972–73 NBA season and averaged 3.1 points per game, 1.0 assists per game and 0.8 rebounds per game. He was waived in middle of December 1972 following an arrest for a drug charge that was later dropped for lack of evidence. Later that same month, he signed with the Scranton Apollos of the Eastern Basketball Association. He appeared in two games for the Apollos, averaging 3.0 points.

== Career statistics ==
Legend
GP	Games played	GS	Games started	MPG	Minutes per game
FG%	Field goal percentage	3P%	3-point field goal percentage	FT%	Free throw percentage
RPG	Rebounds per game	APG	Assists per game	SPG	Steals per game
BPG	Blocks per game	PPG	Points per game	**Bold**	Career high

=== NBA ===
==== Regular season ====
Year	Team	GP	MPG	FG%	FT%	RPG	APG	PPG
1972–73	Buffalo	10	8.4	.375	.875	.8	1.0	3.1
