= 1972–73 Phoenix Suns season =

Professional basketball season

- Head coach: Butch van Breda Kolff (fired); Jerry Colangelo
- General manager: Jerry Colangelo
- Owners: Karl Eller, Don Pitt, Don Diamond, Bhavik Darji, Marvin Meyer, Richard L. Bloch
- Arena: Arizona Veterans Memorial Coliseum

Results
- Record: 38–44 (.463)
- Place: Division: 3rd (Pacific); Conference: 6th (Western)
- Playoff finish: Did not qualify
- Stats at Basketball Reference

Local media
- Television: KTAR-TV
- Radio: KTAR

The 1972–73 Phoenix Suns season was the fifth for the Phoenix Suns of the National Basketball Association, as well as the first season with Al McCoy taking on broadcasting duties for the team. The season began under head coach Butch Van Breda Kolff for the first seven games, before Jerry Colangelo finished coaching duties for the team. All home games were played at Arizona Veterans Memorial Coliseum.

Charlie Scott had played in six games for the Suns one season ago, after a late-season switch to the NBA from the ABA, and his first full season with the Suns was arguably his best. Scott was named to his first NBA All-Star Team, joining teammate Connie Hawkins, who was selected to his fourth and final All-Star Game of his NBA career. In addition to Scott leading the Suns with his 6.1 assist per game average, his 2,048-season-point total was fifth in the league (and the only 2,000+-point season of his career). His average of 25.3 points per contest was sixth-best in the NBA. Center Neal Walk averaged career-bests in both points and rebounds, averaging 20.2 and 12.5 on the season. Walk's rebounding average was just shy of Paul Silas's franchise record of 12.5. Dick Van Arsdale averaged 18.4 points on the season, while Connie Hawkins contributed 16.1 per contest.

== Offseason ==
=== NBA draft ===
Round	Pick	Player	Position	Nationality	College
1	4	David "Corky" Calhoun	Forward	United States	Pennsylvania
3	33	Scott English	Forward	United States	Texas El-Paso
3	34	Don Buse	Guard	United States	Evansville
3	42	Claude Terry	Guard	United States	Stanford
4	59	Matt Gantt	Forward	United States	St. Bonaventure
5	75	Wardell Dyson	Center	United States	Shaw
6	92	Charles Edge	Forward	United States	LeMoyne-Owen
7	109	Bernie Fryer	Guard	United States	Brigham Young
8	125	Russell Golden	Forward	United States	Jackson State
9	140	Bill Kennedy	Guard	United States	Arizona State
10	153	Al Vilcheck	Center	United States	Louisville
11	164	John Belcher	Center	United States	Arkansas State
12	172	Mark Soderberg	Center	United States	Utah
13	179	Kelly Utley	Guard	United States	Shaw
14	186	Ray Golson	Forward	United States	West Texas State

== Roster ==
1972–73 Phoenix Suns roster
Players

Pos.	No.	Player	Height	Weight	DOB	From
F	20	Corky Calhoun	6 ft 7 in (2.01 m)	210 lb (95 kg)	1950-11-01	Penn
F	14	Scott English	6 ft 6 in (1.98 m)	205 lb (93 kg)	1947-01-13	Stanford
F	16	Lamar Green	6 ft 7 in (2.01 m)	210 lb (95 kg)	1947-03-22	Morehead State
G	11	Clem Haskins	6 ft 3 in (1.91 m)	195 lb (88 kg)	1943-07-11	Western Kentucky
F/C	42	Connie Hawkins	6 ft 8 in (2.03 m)	210 lb (95 kg)	1942-07-17	Iowa
G	1	Dennis Layton	6 ft 1 in (1.85 m)	180 lb (82 kg)	1948-12-24	USC
G	33	Charlie Scott	6 ft 5 in (1.96 m)	175 lb (79 kg)	1948-12-15	North Carolina
G/F	23	Paul Stovall	6 ft 4 in (1.93 m)	215 lb (98 kg)	1948-08-16	Arizona State
G/F	5	Dick Van Arsdale	6 ft 5 in (1.96 m)	210 lb (95 kg)	1943-02-22	Indiana
C	41	Neal Walk	6 ft 10 in (2.08 m)	220 lb (100 kg)	1948-07-29	Florida
C	31	Walt Wesley	6 ft 11 in (2.11 m)	220 lb (100 kg)	1945-01-25	Kansas

Coaches
Head coach
- Jerry Colangelo (Illinois)

Legend
- (DP) Unsigned draft pick
- (FA) Free agent
- (S) Suspended
- Injured

== Regular season ==
=== Standings ===
Pacific Division	W	L	PCT	GB	Home	Road	Neutral	Div
y-Los Angeles Lakers	60	22	.732	–	30–11	28–11	2–0	22–4
x-Golden State Warriors	47	35	.573	13	27–14	18–20	2–1	14–12
Phoenix Suns	38	44	.463	22	22–19	15–25	1–0	14–12
Seattle SuperSonics	26	56	.317	34	16–25	10–29	0–2	9–17
Portland Trail Blazers	21	61	.256	39	13–28	8–32	0–1	6–20

#	Western Conference			
#	Team	W	L	PCT
1	z-Milwaukee Bucks	60	22	.732
2	y-Los Angeles Lakers	60	22	.732
3	x-Chicago Bulls	51	31	.622
4	x-Golden State Warriors	47	35	.573
5	Detroit Pistons	40	42	.488
6	Phoenix Suns	38	44	.463
7	Kansas City–Omaha Kings	36	46	.439
8	Seattle SuperSonics	26	56	.317
9	Portland Trail Blazers	21	61	.256

=== Game log ===
1972–73 game log
Total: 38–44 (home: 22–19; road: 16–25)
October: 3–4 (home: 2–2; road: 1–2)

Game	Date	Team	Score	High points	Location Attendance	Record	Streak
1	October 13	Milwaukee	L 105–117	Charlie Scott (26)	Arizona Veterans Memorial Coliseum; 12,408	0–1	L 1
2	October 14	@ Portland	W 124–120	Charlie Scott (38)	Memorial Coliseum; 6,804	1–1	W 1
3	October 15	Baltimore	W 107–98	Neal Walk (27)	Arizona Veterans Memorial Coliseum; 6,372	2–1	W 2
4	October 21	Seattle	W 129–117	Charlie Scott (30)	Arizona Veterans Memorial Coliseum; 8,315	3–1	W 3
5	October 24	Chicago	L 106–107	Charlie Scott (42)	Arizona Veterans Memorial Coliseum; 9,039	3–2	L 1
6	October 27	@ Seattle	L 115–120	Charlie Scott (23)	Seattle Center Coliseum; 8,201	3–3	L 2
7	October 29	@ Los Angeles	L 123–133	Charlie Scott (25)	The Forum; 16,148	3–4	L 3

November: 7–9 (home: 5–1; road: 2–8)

Game	Date	Team	Score	High points	Location Attendance	Record	Streak
8	November 3	@ Chicago	L 100–115	Neal Walk (19)	Chicago Stadium; 11,089	3–5	L 4
9	November 4	@ Milwaukee	W 105–104	Charlie Scott, Neal Walk (20)	Milwaukee Arena; 10,746	4–5	W 1
10	November 5	@ Cleveland	W 107–106	Dick Van Arsdale (28)	Cleveland Arena; 3,624	5–5	W 2
11	November 8	Cleveland	W 107–99	Charlie Scott (34)	Arizona Veterans Memorial Coliseum; 7,264	6–5	W 3
12	November 10	Houston	W 115–109	Charlie Scott (26)	Arizona Veterans Memorial Coliseum; 8,613	7–5	W 4
13	November 12	Philadelphia	W 119–108	Charlie Scott (33)	Arizona Veterans Memorial Coliseum; 8,235	8–5	W 5
14	November 14	@ New York	L 97–103	Charlie Scott (25)	Madison Square Garden; 18,720	8–6	L 1
15	November 15	@ Boston	L 94–113	Charlie Scott (33)	Boston Garden; 8,979	8–7	L 2
16	November 17	@ Baltimore	L 106–117	Charlie Scott (27)	Baltimore Civic Center; 5,429	8–8	L 3
17	November 18	@ Atlanta	L 122–126	Dick Van Arsdale (26)	Omni Coliseum; 7,047	8–9	L 4
18	November 21	@ Kansas City-Omaha	L 96–101	Charlie Scott (23)	Municipal Auditorium; 5,067	8–10	L 5
19	November 23	Detroit	W 128–122	Charlie Scott (42)	Arizona Veterans Memorial Coliseum; 7,576	9–10	W 1
20	November 25	Los Angeles	L 109–116	Neal Walk (32)	Arizona Veterans Memorial Coliseum; 10,482	9–11	L 1
21	November 26	@ Los Angeles	L 107–112	Neal Walk (25)	The Forum; 17,505	9–12	L 2
22	November 28	@ Golden State	L 102–110	Charlie Scott (24)	Oakland–Alameda County Coliseum Arena; 5,043	9–13	L 3
23	November 29	Atlanta	W 109–98	Connie Hawkins, Charlie Scott (27)	Arizona Veterans Memorial Coliseum; 7,241	10–13	W 1

December: 9–6 (home: 6–2; road: 3–4)

Game	Date	Team	Score	High points	Location Attendance	Record	Streak
24	December 1	Golden State	W 115–106	Connie Hawkins (31)	Arizona Veterans Memorial Coliseum; 8,067	11–13	W 2
25	December 3	Milwaukee	L 101–119	Connie Hawkins (19)	Arizona Veterans Memorial Coliseum; 8,531	11–14	L 1
26	December 5	@ Buffalo	L 97–108	Dick Van Arsdale (29)	Buffalo Memorial Auditorium; 3,573	11–15	L 2
27	December 6	@ Detroit	L 105–114	Charlie Scott (28)	Cobo Arena; 2,864	11–16	L 3
28	December 7	@ Philadelphia	W 117–102	Neal Walk (27)	Pittsburgh, PA; 3,878	12–16	W 1
29	December 9	Portland	W 116–97	Neal Walk (26)	Arizona Veterans Memorial Coliseum; 7,801	13–16	W 2
30	December 10	@ Seattle	L 102–110	Dick Van Arsdale (23)	Seattle Center Coliseum; 10,628	13–17	L 1
31	December 13	Boston	L 100–105	Connie Hawkins (27)	Arizona Veterans Memorial Coliseum; 8,596	13–18	L 2
32	December 17	Kansas City-Omaha	W 112–102	Charlie Scott (26)	Arizona Veterans Memorial Coliseum; 6,537	14–18	W 1
33	December 19	New York	W 117–84	Clem Haskins (28)	Arizona Veterans Memorial Coliseum; 8,197	15–18	W 2
34	December 22	@ Los Angeles	W 118–110	Neal Walk (33)	The Forum; 16,733	16–18	W 3
35	December 25	Chicago	W 115–108	Dick Van Arsdale (32)	Arizona Veterans Memorial Coliseum; 10,420	17–18	W 4
36	December 26	@ Houston	L 110–113	Charlie Scott (32)	Hofheinz Pavilion; 3,577	17–19	L 1
37	December 29	Portland	W 106–99	Charlie Scott (29)	Arizona Veterans Memorial Coliseum; 10,310	18–19	W 1
38	December 30	@ Portland	W 107–104	Charlie Scott (38)	Memorial Coliseum; 8,349	19–19	W 2

January: 6–8 (home: 2–6; road: 4–2)

Game	Date	Team	Score	High points	Location Attendance	Record	Streak
39	January 2	@ Cleveland	L 88–111	Connie Hawkins (19)	Cleveland Arena; 2,850	19–20	L 1
40	January 3	@ Detroit	L 105–119	Charlie Scott (27)	Cobo Arena; 3,626	19–21	L 2
41	January 5	@ Chicago	W 126–115	Dick Van Arsdale (37)	Chicago Stadium; 9,091	20–21	W 1
42	January 6	@ Kansas City-Omaha	W 118–112	Charlie Scott (28)	Omaha Civic Auditorium; 5,183	21–21	W 2
43	January 10	Detroit	W 123–121	Charlie Scott (37)	Arizona Veterans Memorial Coliseum; 8,099	22–21	W 3
44	January 12	Golden State	L 107–108	Charlie Scott (33)	Arizona Veterans Memorial Coliseum; 12,103	22–22	L 1
45	January 13	@ Golden State	W 116–110	Neal Walk (28)	Oakland–Alameda County Coliseum Arena; 8,484	23–22	W 1
46	January 14	Baltimore	L 94–95	Charlie Scott (32)	Arizona Veterans Memorial Coliseum; 7,186	23–23	L 1
47	January 16	New York	L 101–102	Dick Van Arsdale (23)	Arizona Veterans Memorial Coliseum; 8,252	23–24	L 2
48	January 18	Kansas City-Omaha	L 96–119	Dick Van Arsdale (18)	Arizona Veterans Memorial Coliseum; 8,117	23–25	L 3
49	January 20	Los Angeles	L 104–124	Neal Walk (29)	Arizona Veterans Memorial Coliseum; 12,608	23–26	L 4
All-Star Break
50	January 25	Seattle	W 112–109	Charlie Scott (34)	Arizona Veterans Memorial Coliseum; 5,701	24–26	W 1
51	January 26	@ Portland	W 120–116	Charlie Scott (33)	Memorial Coliseum; 10,057	25–26	W 2
52	January 27	Portland	L 109–117	Dick Van Arsdale (28)	Arizona Veterans Memorial Coliseum; 7,215	25–27	L 1

February: 7–9 (home: 4–4; road: 3–5)

Game	Date	Team	Score	High points	Location Attendance	Record	Streak
53	February 1	Los Angeles	L 106–120	Neal Walk (29)	Arizona Veterans Memorial Coliseum; 10,705	25–28	L 2
54	February 3	Houston	W 132–123	Charlie Scott, Dick Van Arsdale (26)	Arizona Veterans Memorial Coliseum; 7,282	26–28	W 1
55	February 6	@ Milwaukee	L 111–126	Charlie Scott (29)	Milwaukee Arena; 9,285	26–29	L 1
56	February 7	@ Detroit	L 107–113	Charlie Scott, Dick Van Arsdale (21)	Cobo Arena; 4,491	26–30	L 2
57	February 8	Seattle	W 125–112	Charlie Scott (28)	Arizona Veterans Memorial Coliseum; 7,084	27–30	W 1
58	February 10	Philadelphia	W 126–121	Charlie Scott (27)	Arizona Veterans Memorial Coliseum; 9,176	28–30	W 2
59	February 14	Buffalo	W 124–107	Neal Walk (25)	Arizona Veterans Memorial Coliseum; 6,871	29–30	W 3
60	February 16	Atlanta	L 104–111	Dick Van Arsdale (28)	Arizona Veterans Memorial Coliseum; 10,155	29–31	L 1
61	February 17	@ Houston	L 111–127	Charlie Scott (41)	Hofheinz Pavilion; 3,119	29–32	L 2
62	February 18	Portland	L 118–119	Neal Walk (23)	Arizona Veterans Memorial Coliseum; 5,260	29–33	L 3
63	February 20	@ Boston	L 97–107	Charlie Scott (25)	Boston Garden; 9,954	29–34	L 4
64	February 21	@ Baltimore	W 107–98	Charlie Scott (27)	Baltimore Civic Center; 5,525	30–34	W 1
65	February 23	@ Buffalo	W 125–106	Charlie Scott (29)	Buffalo Memorial Auditorium; 5,830	31–34	W 2
66	February 24	@ Chicago	L 100–122	Charlie Scott (26)	Chicago Stadium; 12,753	31–35	L 1
67	February 25	@ Kansas City-Omaha	W 111–109	Charlie Scott (24)	Municipal Auditorium; 10,007	32–35	W 1
68	February 28	Kansas City-Omaha	L 107–109	Charlie Scott (29)	Arizona Veterans Memorial Coliseum; 7,230	32–36	L 1

March: 6–8 (home: 3–4; road: 3–4)

Game	Date	Team	Score	High points	Location Attendance	Record	Streak
69	March 4	Chicago	L 117–118 (OT)	Neal Walk (30)	Arizona Veterans Memorial Coliseum; 7,085	32–37	L 2
70	March 6	Cleveland	W 110–102	Neal Walk (26)	Arizona Veterans Memorial Coliseum; 5,236	33–37	W 1
71	March 8	Boston	L 134–141 (OT)	Charlie Scott (29)	Arizona Veterans Memorial Coliseum; 10,052	33–38	L 1
72	March 10	Detroit	L 110–117	Clem Haskins, Charlie Scott (23)	Arizona Veterans Memorial Coliseum; 7,510	33–39	L 2
73	March 12	@ Milwaukee	L 95–126	Neal Walk (22)	Milwaukee Arena; 10,746	33–40	L 3
74	March 13	@ New York	L 111–115	Charlie Scott (33)	Madison Square Garden; 19,674	33–41	L 4
75	March 14	@ Philadelphia	W 120–114	Charlie Scott (32)	The Spectrum; 5,641	34–41	W 1
76	March 16	@ Atlanta	L 127–135	Charlie Scott (31)	Omni Coliseum; 6,512	34–42	L 1
77	March 18	@ Los Angeles	L 113–131	Charlie Scott (35)	The Forum; 17,505	34–43	L 2
78	March 21	Buffalo	W 134–124 (OT)	Charlie Scott (30)	Arizona Veterans Memorial Coliseum; 7,603	35–43	W 1
79	March 23	Golden State	W 125–124	Charlie Scott (28)	Arizona Veterans Memorial Coliseum; 8,197	36–43	W 2
80	March 25	Milwaukee	L 112–114	Neal Walk (24)	Arizona Veterans Memorial Coliseum; 9,386	36–44	L 1
81	March 26	@ Golden State	W 120–114	Connie Hawkins (29)	Oakland–Alameda County Coliseum Arena; 3,677	37–44	W 1
82	March 28	@ Seattle	W 127–125	Neal Walk (27)	Seattle Center Coliseum; 11,246	38–44	W 2

1972–73 schedule

== Awards and honors ==
=== All-Star ===
- Charlie Scott was selected as a reserve for the Western Conference in the All-Star Game. It was his first All-Star selection.
- Connie Hawkins was selected to replace Rick Barry in the All-Star Game. It was his fourth consecutive All-Star selection.

== Player statistics ==
Legend
GP	Games played	MPG	Minutes per game
FG%	Field-goal percentage	FT%	Free-throw percentage
RPG	Rebounds per game	APG	Assists per game
PPG	Points per game

=== Season ===
Player	GP	MPG	FG%	FT%	RPG	APG	PPG
Corky Calhoun	82	24.7	.469	.740	4.1	0.9	6.0
Scott English	29	6.8	.387	.724	1.5	0.5	3.2
Lamar Green	80	25.6	.431	.754	9.3	1.1	6.7
Clem Haskins	77	20.5	.464	.833	2.2	2.6	10.5
Connie Hawkins	75	36.9	.479	.797	8.5	4.1	16.1
Gus Johnson*	21	19.9	.381	.694	6.5	1.5	7.8
Mo Layton	65	15.2	.431	.756	1.2	2.1	7.1
Charlie Scott	81	37.8	.446	.784	4.2	6.1	25.3
Paul Stovall	25	8.4	.342	.632	2.4	0.5	3.0
Dick Van Arsdale	81	36.8	.476	.859	4.0	3.3	18.4
Neal Walk	81	38.4	.466	.786	12.4	3.5	20.2
Walt Wesley*	45	8.1	.406	.529	2.5	0.5	3.2

== Transactions ==
=== Trades ===
April 7, 1972	To Houston Rockets (United States) Otto Moore	To Phoenix Suns 1972 first-round draft pick ( (United States) Corky Calhoun)
April 10, 1972	To Baltimore Bullets 1972 second-round draft pick ( (United States) Tom Patterson)	To Phoenix Suns (United States) Gus Johnson
September 19, 1972	To Los Angeles Lakers 1974 second-round draft pick ( (United States) Truck Robinson) Future draft pick	To Phoenix Suns (United States) Paul Stovall
October 10, 1972	To Philadelphia 76ers (United States) Mel Counts	To Phoenix Suns 1973 second-round draft pick ( (United States) Gary Melchionni)
November 22, 1972	To Cleveland Cavaliers 1973 second-round draft pick ( (United States) Allan Hornyak)	To Phoenix Suns (United States) Walt Wesley

=== Free agents ===
==== Subtractions ====
Date	Player	Reason left	New team
September 25, 1972	Jeff Webb	Waived	—N/a (Retired)
September 29, 1972	Art Harris	Waived	Belgium Lions
October 9, 1972	John Wetzel	Waived	Atlanta Hawks
December 1, 1972	Gus Johnson	Waived	Indiana Pacers (ABA)
