= 1972–73 Cleveland Cavaliers season =

NBA professional basketball team season

- Head coach: Bill Fitch
- Arena: Cleveland Arena

Results
- Record: 32–50 (.390)
- Place: Division: 4th (Central); Conference: 6th (Eastern)
- Playoff finish: Did not qualify
- Stats at Basketball Reference

Local media
- Television: WEWS-TV
- Radio: WERE

The 1972–73 Cleveland Cavaliers season was the third season of NBA basketball in Cleveland, Ohio. The Cavaliers finished the season with a 32–50 record, finishing last in the Central Division and 6th Eastern Conference. This was the 2nd consecutive year with a total win increase. Lenny Wilkens led the team in assists and was named an All-Star.

== Offseason ==
=== Trades ===
August 23: Guard Lenny Wilkens and forward Barry Clemens obtained from the Seattle SuperSonics in exchange for guard Butch Beard.

September 21: Cavaliers trade the rights to 1971 second-round draft choice Steve Hawes to the Houston Rockets in exchange for a future undisclosed draft choice.

== Draft picks ==
Round	Pick	Player	Position	Nationality	College/Club team
1	3	Dwight Davis	PF	United States	Houston
2	24	Steve Hawes	C	United States	Washington

- Note: This table only lists players drafted through the second round.

== Roster ==
1972–73 Cleveland Cavaliers roster
Players

Pos.	No.	Player	Height	Weight	DOB	From
G	34	Austin Carr	6 ft 4 in (1.93 m)	200 lb (91 kg)	Mar. 10, 1948	Notre Dame
G	5	Jim Cleamons	6 ft 3 in (1.91 m)	185 lb (84 kg)	Sep. 13, 1949	Ohio State
F	40	Barry Clemens	6 ft 6 in (1.98 m)	210 lb (95 kg)	May 1, 1943	Ohio Wesleyan
F	42	Dwight Davis	6 ft 8 in (2.03 m)	220 lb (100 kg)	Oct. 28, 1949	Houston
F	32	John Johnson	6 ft 7 in (2.01 m)	200 lb (91 kg)	Oct. 18, 1947	Iowa
C	50	Steve Patterson	6 ft 9 in (2.06 m)	225 lb (102 kg)	Jun. 24, 1948	UCLA
F/C	35	Rick Roberson	6 ft 9 in (2.06 m)	231 lb (105 kg)	Jul. 7, 1947	Cincinnati
C	45	Bob Rule	6 ft 9 in (2.06 m)	220 lb (100 kg)	Jun. 29, 1944	Colorado State
G/F	7	Bingo Smith	6 ft 5 in (1.96 m)	195 lb (88 kg)	Feb. 26, 1946	Tulsa
F/C	15	Cornell Warner	6 ft 9 in (2.06 m)	220 lb (100 kg)	Aug. 12, 1948	Jackson State
G	11	John Warren	6 ft 3 in (1.91 m)	180 lb (82 kg)	Jul. 7, 1947	St. John's
G	19	Lenny Wilkens	6 ft 1 in (1.85 m)	180 lb (82 kg)	Oct. 28, 1937	Providence

Coaches
Head coach
- Bill Fitch
Assistant(s)
- Jimmy Rodgers

Legend
- (DP) Unsigned draft pick
- (FA) Free agent
- (S) Suspended
- Injured

== Regular season ==
=== Season standings ===
Central Division	W	L	PCT	GB	Home	Road	Neutral	Div
y-Baltimore Bullets	52	30	.634	–	24–9	21–17	7–4	17–5
x-Atlanta Hawks	46	36	.561	6	28–13	17–23	1–0	10–12
Houston Rockets	33	49	.402	19	14–14	10–28	9–7	9–13
Cleveland Cavaliers	32	50	.390	20	20–21	10–27	2–2	8–14

#	Eastern Conference			
#	Team	W	L	PCT
1	z-Boston Celtics	68	14	.829
2	x-New York Knicks	57	25	.695
3	y-Baltimore Bullets	52	30	.634
4	x-Atlanta Hawks	46	36	.561
5	Houston Rockets	33	49	.402
6	Cleveland Cavaliers	32	50	.390
7	Buffalo Braves	21	61	.256
8	Philadelphia 76ers	9	73	.110

=== Game log ===
1972–73 Game log
#	Date	Opponent	Score	High points	Record
1	October 10	Baltimore	102–90	John Johnson (24)	0–1
2	October 13	Houston	109–108	Austin Carr (40)	0–2
3	October 15	Los Angeles	95–83	Austin Carr (26)	0–3
4	October 20	New York	92–89	Austin Carr (22)	0–4
5	October 21	@ Detroit	96–103	Rick Roberson (21)	0–5
6	October 22	Milwaukee	104–84	Carr, C. Davis, Johnson (14)	0–6
7	October 24	@ New York	90–123	Austin Carr (15)	0–7
8	October 25	@ Philadelphia	113–108	Austin Carr (35)	1–7
9	October 27	@ Boston	97–123	Lenny Wilkens (23)	1–8
10	October 29	Kansas City–Omaha	97–115	Austin Carr (22)	2–8
11	October 31	Philadelphia	116–126	Smith, Wilkens (27)	3–8
12	November 3	Buffalo	97–124	Austin Carr (26)	4–8
13	November 4	N Baltimore	98–108	Austin Carr (22)	4–9
14	November 5	Phoenix	107–106	Lenny Wilkens (29)	4–10
15	November 8	@ Phoenix	99–107	Austin Carr (26)	4–11
16	November 10	@ Los Angeles	88–118	Lenny Wilkens (16)	4–12
17	November 12	@ Seattle	113–107	Carr, Wilkens (22)	5–12
18	November 14	@ Portland	91–100	Dwight Davis (21)	5–13
19	November 17	@ Kansas City–Omaha	96–115	John Johnson (26)	5–14
20	November 19	Atlanta	98–109	Austin Carr (26)	6–14
21	November 21	Seattle	88–98	Austin Carr (31)	7–14
22	November 25	@ Buffalo	103–90	Lenny Wilkens (20)	8–14
23	November 26	Portland	105–102	Lenny Wilkens (29)	8–15
24	November 28	@ New York	84–107	Lenny Wilkens (22)	8–16
25	December 1	Detroit	114–113	Austin Carr (29)	8–17
26	December 3	Seattle	103–105 (OT)	Austin Carr (30)	9–17
27	December 5	Baltimore	103–100	Austin Carr (31)	9–18
28	December 8	Boston	96–87	Austin Carr (20)	9–19
29	December 9	@ Boston	88–123	Austin Carr (27)	9–20
30	December 10	Golden State	103–100	Austin Carr (26)	9–21
31	December 12	@ Kansas City–Omaha	99–100	Austin Carr (27)	9–22
32	December 15	@ Milwaukee	82–98	Dwight Davis (17)	9–23
33	December 16	@ Atlanta	94–100	Carr, Johnson (21)	9–24
34	December 17	Houston	110–109	John Johnson (30)	9–25
35	December 22	New York	98–87	Austin Carr (27)	9–26
36	December 26	Atlanta	96–115	Austin Carr (26)	10–26
37	December 28	@ Golden State	105–118	Lenny Wilkens (25)	10–27
38	December 29	@ Seattle	91–99	Austin Carr (20)	10–28
39	January 2	Phoenix	88–111	Austin Carr (20)	11–28
40	January 3	@ Baltimore	80–89	Rick Roberson (17)	11–29
41	January 6	Los Angeles	93–108	Lenny Wilkens (36)	12–29
42	January 7	Houston	97–102	Lenny Wilkens (24)	13–29
43	January 9	@ Buffalo	102–106	Lenny Wilkens (23)	13–30
44	January 12	N Philadelphia	109–113 (2OT)	Lenny Wilkens (27)	14–30
45	January 13	@ Houston	123–115	Austin Carr (25)	15–30
46	January 16	@ Golden State	100–98	Lenny Wilkens (22)	16–30
47	January 19	@ Houston	108–104	John Johnson (28)	17–30
48	January 20	@ Atlanta	84–96	Austin Carr (16)	17–31
49	January 26	Philadelphia	100–105	Lenny Wilkens (28)	18–31
50	January 28	Baltimore	102–93	Lenny Wilkens (22)	18–32
51	January 30	Milwaukee	98–112	Dwight Davis (23)	19–32
52	January 31	@ Boston	89–94	John Johnson (22)	19–33
53	February 3	@ New York	90–95	Lenny Wilkens (20)	19–34
54	February 4	New York	114–97	Lenny Wilkens (23)	19–35
55	February 6	Boston	105–110	Lenny Wilkens (31)	20–35
56	February 8	@ Atlanta	136–132 (OT)	Austin Carr (38)	21–35
57	February 9	Chicago	103–97	Austin Carr (26)	21–36
58	February 11	Atlanta	115–107	Austin Carr (26)	21–37
59	February 13	Golden State	103–90	Austin Carr (21)	21–38
60	February 16	@ Chicago	92–100	Austin Carr (23)	21–39
61	February 17	@ Detroit	106–104	Austin Carr (23)	22–39
62	February 18	Buffalo	98–122	Austin Carr (26)	23–39
63	February 20	N Milwaukee	118–100	Lenny Wilkens (20)	23–40
64	February 23	Portland	102–121	Austin Carr (26)	24–40
65	February 25	Boston	105–92	Lenny Wilkens (23)	24–41
66	February 27	@ Baltimore	95–99	Lenny Wilkens (24)	24–42
67	March 2	@ Portland	92–106	Lenny Wilkens (32)	24–43
68	March 4	@ Los Angeles	84–127	Austin Carr (18)	24–44
69	March 6	@ Phoenix	102–110	Lenny Wilkens (26)	24–45
70	March 7	N Houston	100–118	John Johnson (22)	25–45
71	March 10	@ Houston	116–131	Austin Carr (26)	25–46
72	March 13	Atlanta	107–115	Austin Carr (28)	26–46
73	March 16	Kansas City–Omaha	99–114	Bingo Smith (21)	27–46
74	March 17	@ Buffalo	114–97	Carr, Roberson (18)	28–46
75	March 18	Buffalo	101–102	Lenny Wilkens (21)	29–46
76	March 20	Philadelphia	105–131	Austin Carr (25)	30–46
77	March 21	@ Philadelphia	112–109	Austin Carr (24)	31–46
78	March 23	Baltimore	106–104	Lenny Wilkens (25)	31–47
79	March 24	@ Baltimore	116–120 (OT)	Austin Carr (31)	31–48
80	March 25	Chicago	105–112	Lenny Wilkens (26)	32–48
81	March 27	@ Chicago	105–121	Johnson, Wilkens (18)	32–49
82	March 28	Detroit	131–119 (OT)	Austin Carr (27)	32–50

== Awards and records ==
- Dwight Davis, NBA All-Rookie Team 1st Team
