= 1972–73 Buffalo Braves season =

1972–73 basketball season for Buffalo Braves

- Head coach: Jack Ramsay
- Arena: Buffalo Memorial Auditorium; Maple Leaf Gardens

Results
- Record: 21–61 (.256)
- Place: Division: 3rd (Atlantic); Conference: 7th (Eastern)
- Playoff finish: Did not qualify
- Stats at Basketball Reference

Local media
- Television: WBEN-TV
- Radio: WBEN

The 1972–73 Buffalo Braves season was the 3rd season of the Buffalo Braves of the National Basketball Association (NBA). Despite finishing with a worse record than their previous 2 seasons, their 21–61 record was good enough for 3rd place. The Braves showed improvement under new Coach Jack Ramsay. Rookie center Bob McAdoo provided the silver lining by winning the Rookie of the Year Award with 18.0 points per game and 9.1 rebounds per game.

During the fifth game of the season versus the Boston Celtics on October 20, 1972, the team set an NBA record which still stands for most points in a single quarter with 58, and still managed to lose 126–118.

== Draft picks ==
Round	Pick	Player	Position	Nationality	College
1	2	Bob McAdoo	Forward	United States	North Carolina
2	15	Harold Fox	Guard	United States	Jacksonville
3	32	Bob Morse	Forward	United States	Penn
4	49	George Bryant	Guard	United States	Eastern Kentucky
5	65	Arnie Berman	Forward	United States	Brown
6	82	Ed Czernota	Center	United States	Sacred Heart (Connecticut)
7	99	Greg Kohls	Guard	United States	Syracuse
8	115	Andy Denny	Guard	United States	South Alabama
9	131	John Collins	Center	United States	SUNY Brockport
11	158	Jim Prokell	Guard	United States	Edinboro (Pennsylvania)
12	167	Frank Dewitt	Forward	United States	Virginia
13	176	Kim Huband	Forward	United States	North Carolina
14	182	Greg Corson	Center	United States	North Carolina
15	189	Paul Hoffman	Guard	United States	St. Bonaventure
16	194	Norman Bounds	Forward	United States	SUNY Brockport

== Roster ==
1972–73 Buffalo Braves roster
Players

Pos.	No.	Player	Height	Weight	DOB	From
G	7	Harold Fox	6 ft 2 in (1.88 m)	175 lb (79 kg)		Jacksonville
G	20	Dick Garrett	6 ft 3 in (1.91 m)	185 lb (84 kg)		Southern Illinois
G	42	Walt Hazzard	6 ft 3 in (1.91 m)	185 lb (84 kg)		UCLA
F	27	Bill Hewitt	6 ft 5 in (1.96 m)	210 lb (95 kg)		USC
G	32	Fred Hilton	6 ft 3 in (1.91 m)	185 lb (84 kg)		Grambling State
F	45	John Hummer	6 ft 9 in (2.06 m)	230 lb (104 kg)		Princeton
F	44	Bob Kauffman	6 ft 8 in (2.03 m)	240 lb (109 kg)		Guilford
G	5	Howard Komives	6 ft 1 in (1.85 m)	185 lb (84 kg)		Bowling Green
F	11	Bob McAdoo	6 ft 9 in (2.06 m)	210 lb (95 kg)		North Carolina
C	3	Elmore Smith	7 ft 1 in (2.16 m)	250 lb (113 kg)		Kentucky State
G	9	Randy Smith	6 ft 3 in (1.91 m)	185 lb (84 kg)		Buffalo State
C	35	Cornell Warner	6 ft 9 in (2.06 m)	220 lb (100 kg)		Jackson State
G	13	Dave Wohl	6 ft 2 in (1.88 m)	185 lb (84 kg)		Penn

Coaches
Head coach
- Jack Ramsay

Legend
- (DP) Unsigned draft pick
- (FA) Free agent
- (S) Suspended
- Injured

=== Roster Notes ===
- Center Cornell Warner and guard Walt Hazzard played in only 4 games and 9 games respectively before being waived in November.
- Guard Harold Fox played in only 10 games before being waived in December.
- Guard Dave Wohl came back to the franchise, now known as the Los Angeles Clippers, as an assistant coach from 1993 to 1994 and as its general manager from 2014 to 2017.

== Regular season ==
=== Season standings ===
Atlantic Division	W	L	PCT	GB	Home	Road	Neutral	Div
y-Boston Celtics	68	14	.829	–	33–6	32–8	3–0	18–4
x-New York Knicks	57	25	.695	11	35–6	21–18	1–1	16–6
Buffalo Braves	21	61	.256	47	14–27	6–31	1–3	8–14
Philadelphia 76ers	9	73	.110	59	5–26	2–36	2–11	2–20

#	Eastern Conference			
#	Team	W	L	PCT
1	z-Boston Celtics	68	14	.829
2	x-New York Knicks	57	25	.695
3	y-Baltimore Bullets	52	30	.634
4	x-Atlanta Hawks	46	36	.561
5	Houston Rockets	33	49	.402
6	Cleveland Cavaliers	32	50	.390
7	Buffalo Braves	21	61	.256
8	Philadelphia 76ers	9	73	.110

=== Game log ===
1972–73 Game log
#	Date	Opponent	Score	High points	Record
1	October 10	Atlanta	120–109	Dick Garrett (25)	0–1
2	October 13	@ Philadelphia	104–101	Fred Hilton (22)	1–1
3	October 14	Houston	121–113	Fred Hilton (36)	1–2
4	October 17	Philadelphia	114–122	Bob Kauffman (24)	2–2
5	October 20	@ Boston	118–126	Randy Smith (29)	2–3
6	October 21	Milwaukee	91–63	John Hummer (12)	2–4
7	October 24	Boston	105–97	Bob Kauffman (24)	2–5
8	October 25	@ Milwaukee	92–109	Elmore Smith (28)	2–6
9	October 28	Kansas City–Omaha	113–102	Bob Kauffman (17)	2–7
10	November 3	@ Cleveland	97–124	Bob Kauffman (19)	2–8
11	November 4	Chicago	99–101	Bob Kauffman (28)	3–8
12	November 7	Golden State	105–91	Bob McAdoo (21)	3–9
13	November 8	Baltimore	94–126	Bob McAdoo (18)	3–10
14	November 10	Boston	106–104	Bob Kauffman (25)	3–11
15	November 14	@ Kansas City–Omaha	100–106	Bob Kauffman (34)	3–12
16	November 17	@ Los Angeles	100–103	Bob Kauffman (28)	3–13
17	November 18	@ Golden State	92–120	Bob Kauffman (26)	3–14
18	November 19	@ Seattle	84–107	Randy Smith (19)	3–15
19	November 21	Baltimore	124–88	Dick Garrett (16)	3–16
20	November 24	N Philadelphia	96–105	Dick Garrett (26)	4–16
21	November 25	Cleveland	103–90	Dick Garrett (19)	4–17
22	November 28	Philadelphia	101–94	Elmore Smith (32)	4–18
23	November 30	@ Detroit	116–127	Elmore Smith (29)	4–19
24	December 1	Seattle	90–93	Randy Smith (27)	5–19
25	December 2	@ New York	94–119	Elmore Smith (28)	5–20
26	December 5	Phoenix	97–108	Bob Kauffman (27)	6–20
27	December 8	New York	89–91	Dick Garrett (21)	7–20
28	December 9	@ Chicago	94–105	Elmore Smith (29)	7–21
29	December 12	Houston	94–95	Elmore Smith (25)	8–21
30	December 15	Golden State	129–95	Bob Kauffman (20)	8–22
31	December 16	@ Philadelphia	126–103	Bob Kauffman (32)	9–22
32	December 19	Los Angeles	126–100	Elmore Smith (35)	9–23
33	December 22	Atlanta	110–109	Elmore Smith (21)	9–24
34	December 26	Baltimore	121–104	Elmore Smith (25)	9–25
35	December 28	@ New York	86–107	Bob McAdoo (23)	9–26
36	December 29	@ Baltimore	118–109	Randy Smith (33)	10–26
37	December 30	@ Atlanta	110–120	Elmore Smith (24)	10–27
38	January 2	Philadelphia	110–114	Bob McAdoo (30)	11–27
39	January 5	New York	129–106	Bob McAdoo (26)	11–28
40	January 6	@ Milwaukee	96–110	Randy Smith (21)	11–29
41	January 7	@ Chicago	96–119	Bob McAdoo (26)	11–30
42	January 9	Cleveland	102–106	McAdoo, E. Smith (22)	12–30
43	January 12	Portland	100–120	Bob McAdoo (31)	13–30
44	January 16	Boston	106–102	Randy Smith (27)	13–31
45	January 18	@ Atlanta	127–125	Bob McAdoo (32)	14–31
46	January 19	Detroit	98–108	Elmore Smith (28)	15–31
47	January 21	@ Boston	97–104	Elmore Smith (32)	15–32
48	January 25	@ New York	92–99	Elmore Smith (21)	15–33
49	January 26	Atlanta	118–82	Elmore Smith (22)	15–34
50	January 27	@ Baltimore	87–115	Bob McAdoo (25)	15–35
51	January 28	@ Philadelphia	101–96	Elmore Smith (25)	16–35
52	January 30	Philadelphia	104–105	Elmore Smith (36)	17–35
53	February 2	Milwaukee	114–108	Randy Smith (27)	17–36
54	February 3	@ Atlanta	101–105	Dick Garrett (22)	17–37
55	February 4	N Houston	130–118	Bob McAdoo (31)	17–38
56	February 6	Detroit	107–105	Bob McAdoo (31)	17–39
57	February 9	Baltimore	101–95	Bob McAdoo (33)	17–40
58	February 11	@ Seattle	128–125	Bob McAdoo (39)	18–40
59	February 13	@ Portland	100–120	Elmore Smith (25)	18–41
60	February 14	@ Phoenix	107–124	Bob McAdoo (32)	18–42
61	February 16	New York	102–98	McAdoo, E. Smith (22)	18–43
62	February 18	@ Cleveland	98–122	Bob Kauffman (20)	18–44
63	February 20	Kansas City–Omaha	106–113	Elmore Smith (27)	19–44
64	February 23	Phoenix	125–106	Bob McAdoo (34)	19–45
65	February 24	@ New York	97–125	Bob Kauffman (20)	19–46
66	February 27	Houston	112–105	Elmore Smith (22)	19–47
67	March 2	Seattle	139–120	Bob McAdoo (41)	19–48
68	March 4	@ Boston	113–125	Randy Smith (32)	19–49
69	March 6	Boston	127–112	Bob Kauffman (28)	19–50
70	March 8	Chicago	102–112	Bob McAdoo (28)	20–50
71	March 10	Portland	101–106	Elmore Smith (29)	21–50
72	March 13	Los Angeles	121–112	Bob Kauffman (28)	21–51
73	March 16	@ Detroit	100–121	Bob McAdoo (28)	21–52
74	March 17	Cleveland	114–97	Elmore Smith (21)	21–53
75	March 18	@ Cleveland	101–102	Bob Kauffman (21)	21–54
76	March 20	@ Kansas City–Omaha	115–119	Elmore Smith (33)	21–55
77	March 21	@ Phoenix	124–134 (OT)	Randy Smith (21)	21–56
78	March 23	@ Los Angeles	101–121	John Hummer (20)	21–57
79	March 24	@ Golden State	101–106	Bob McAdoo (29)	21–58
80	March 25	@ Portland	107–113 (OT)	Bob McAdoo (39)	21–59
81	March 27	N Houston	121–111	Bob McAdoo (39)	21–60
82	March 28	N Houston	138–122	Bob McAdoo (45)	21–61

== Player statistics ==
Note: GP= Games Played; MPG = Minutes per game; FG% = Field goal percentage; FT% = Free throw percentage; RPG = Rebounds per game; APG = Assists per game; PPG = Points per game

Player	GP	MPG	FG%	FT%	RPG	APG	PPG
Bob Kauffman	77	39.6	.505	.780	11.1	5.1	17.5
Elmore Smith	76	37.2	.482	.558	12.4	3.9	18.3
Bob McAdoo	80	32.0	.452	.774	9.1	3.2	18.0
Randy Smith	82	31.7	.443	.727	4.8	5.1	14.8
Dave Wohl	56	27.5	.456	.790	1.6	4.6	8.8
John Hummer	66	23.4	.444	.561	4.9	2.1	8.0
Dick Garrett	78	23.1	.419	.873	2.7	2.8	10.0
Howard Komives	67	21.9	.380	.867	1.8	3.6	6.1
Bill Hewitt	73	18.2	.418	.554	5.0	1.5	4.7
Walt Hazzard	9	14.9	.417	.500	1.1	1.9	5.9
Fred Hilton	59	12.4	.387	.774	1.7	1.3	7.2
Cornell Warner	4	11.8	.471	.500	3.8	1.5	4.3
Harold Fox	10	8.4	.375	.875	0.8	1.0	3.1

== Awards and honors ==
- Bob Kauffman, NBA All-Star
- Bob McAdoo, NBA Rookie of the Year

== Transactions ==
The Braves were involved in the following transactions during the 1972–73 season.

=== Coaching Change ===
Offseason
Outgoing coach	Date Removed	1971–72 Record	Incoming coach
Johnny McCarthy	Fired, March 27, 1972	22–60	Jack Ramsay

=== Trades ===
September 29, 1972
To Buffalo Braves

- Howard Komives
To Detroit Pistons

- 1973 2nd round draft pick

=== Free agents ===
==== Additions ====
Player	Signed	Former team
Bill Hewitt	claimed off waivers, October 9	Detroit Pistons
Dave Wohl	claimed off waivers, December 6	Portland Trail Blazers

==== Subtractions ====
Player	Left	New team
Em Bryant	waived, May 16	Columbia Lions (assistant coach)
Bill Hosket	free agency, July 1	United States Olympic Basketball Committee
Mike Davis	waived, October 9	Baltimore Bullets
Cornell Warner	waived, November 1	Cleveland Cavaliers
Walt Hazzard	waived, November 9	Golden State Warriors
Harold Fox	waived, December 18	Scranton Apollos
