= 1972–73 Baltimore Bullets season =

NBA professional basketball team season

- Division champions
- Head coach: Gene Shue
- General manager: Jerry Sachs
- Owner: Abe Pollin
- Arena: Baltimore Civic Center

Results
- Record: 52–30 (.634)
- Place: Division: 1st (Central); Conference: 2nd (Eastern)
- Playoff finish: Conference Semi-finals (lost to Knicks 1–4)
- Stats at Basketball Reference

Local media
- Television: WDCA
- Radio: WWDC; WISZ(Jim Karvellas)

In the 1972–73 Baltimore Bullets season, their 12th overall season and tenth and final season in Baltimore, Maryland, the Bullets were led by seventh-year head coach Gene Shue and won a third consecutive Central Division title.

Prior to the season in June, forward Elvin Hayes was acquired in a trade from the Houston Rockets, for forward Jack Marin and draft picks. In the 1972 draft in April, Baltimore selected point guard Kevin Porter in the third round. After a slow start, the Bullets had a strong 10–4 record in December. In the playoffs, they faced their playoff rivals the New York Knicks, and fell in five games in the conference semi-finals; the Knicks went on to win the NBA title.

Following the season, the Bullets made a move of roughly over 30 miles to the new Capital Centre in Landover, a suburb east of Washington, D.C., and became the Capital Bullets. The Bullets would later play 35 regular season games in Baltimore from the 1988–89 through 1996–97 seasons.

== Roster ==
1972–73 Baltimore Bullets roster
Players

Pos.	No.	Player	Height	Weight	DOB	From
G	45	Phil Chenier	6 ft 3 in (1.91 m)	180 lb (82 kg)		California
G	21	Archie Clark	6 ft 2 in (1.88 m)	175 lb (79 kg)		Minnesota
C	11	Elvin Hayes	6 ft 9 in (2.06 m)	235 lb (107 kg)		Houston
F	13	Stan Love	6 ft 9 in (2.06 m)	215 lb (98 kg)		Oregon
F	24	Jack Marin	6 ft 6 in (1.98 m)	210 lb (95 kg)		Duke
PG	10	Kevin Porter	6 ft 0 in (1.83 m)	170 lb (77 kg)		Saint Francis (PA)
G	33	Rich Rinaldi	6 ft 3 in (1.91 m)	195 lb (88 kg)		Saint Peter's
SG	6	Mike Riordan	6 ft 4 in (1.93 m)	200 lb (91 kg)		Providence
SF	9	Dave Stallworth	6 ft 7 in (2.01 m)	200 lb (91 kg)		Wichita State
PF	12	John Tresvant	6 ft 7 in (2.01 m)	215 lb (98 kg)		Seattle
F	41	Wes Unseld	6 ft 7 in (2.01 m)	245 lb (111 kg)		Louisville

Coaches
Head coach
- Gene Shue

Legend
- (DP) Unsigned draft pick
- (FA) Free agent
- (S) Suspended
- Injured

== Regular season ==
=== Season standings ===
Central Division	W	L	PCT	GB	Home	Road	Neutral	Div
y-Baltimore Bullets	52	30	.634	–	24–9	21–17	7–4	17–5
x-Atlanta Hawks	46	36	.561	6	28–13	17–23	1–0	10–12
Houston Rockets	33	49	.402	19	14–14	10–28	9–7	9–13
Cleveland Cavaliers	32	50	.390	20	20–21	10–27	2–2	8–14

#	Eastern Conference			
#	Team	W	L	PCT
1	z-Boston Celtics	68	14	.829
2	x-New York Knicks	57	25	.695
3	y-Baltimore Bullets	52	30	.634
4	x-Atlanta Hawks	46	36	.561
5	Houston Rockets	33	49	.402
6	Cleveland Cavaliers	32	50	.390
7	Buffalo Braves	21	61	.256
8	Philadelphia 76ers	9	73	.110

=== Game log ===
1972–73 game log
#	Date	Opponent	Score	High points	Record
1	October 10	@ Cleveland	102–90	Rich Rinaldi (26)	1–0
2	October 13	Atlanta	98–115	Phil Chenier (24)	2–0
3	October 15	@ Phoenix	98–107	Chenier, Unseld (22)	2–1
4	October 16	@ Golden State	96–97	Phil Chenier (22)	2–2
5	October 19	@ Kansas City–Omaha	94–83	Phil Chenier (24)	3–2
6	October 21	Boston	104–101	Phil Chenier (24)	3–3
7	October 25	@ Detroit	115–105	Mike Riordan (24)	4–3
8	October 27	New York	92–88	Rich Rinaldi (21)	4–4
9	October 28	@ New York	90–94	Mike Riordan (27)	4–5
10	November 3	@ Boston	96–109	Mike Davis (26)	4–6
11	November 4	N Cleveland	98–108	Mike Riordan (25)	5–6
12	November 7	@ Atlanta	107–109 (OT)	Mike Riordan (28)	5–7
13	November 8	Buffalo	94–126	Elvin Hayes (25)	6–7
14	November 10	@ Milwaukee	82–120	Elvin Hayes (25)	6–8
15	November 11	Chicago	111–106	Elvin Hayes (30)	6–9
16	November 14	Houston	103–104	Elvin Hayes (22)	7–9
17	November 17	Phoenix	106–117	Phil Chenier (26)	8–9
18	November 18	@ Chicago	79–95	Dave Stallworth (18)	8–10
19	November 21	@ Buffalo	124–88	Phil Chenier (27)	9–10
20	November 22	Seattle	90–112	Elvin Hayes (23)	10–10
21	November 25	Milwaukee	101–91	Elvin Hayes (31)	10–11
22	November 28	N Houston	90–108	Mike Riordan (27)	11–11
23	November 29	N Houston	102–94	Elvin Hayes (30)	11–12
24	December 1	Houston	96–103	Phil Chenier (27)	12–12
25	December 5	@ Cleveland	103–100	Elvin Hayes (27)	13–12
26	December 6	Portland	102–115	Phil Chenier (53)	14–12
27	December 8	@ Atlanta	115–134	Mike Riordan (27)	14–13
28	December 9	Kansas City–Omaha	112–120	Mike Riordan (30)	15–13
29	December 12	Philadelphia	102–123	Mike Riordan (31)	16–13
30	December 15	Houston	91–94	Elvin Hayes (20)	17–13
31	December 16	N Golden State	99–105	Elvin Hayes (33)	18–13
32	December 20	Los Angeles	96–90	Chenier, Hayes (21)	18–14
33	December 23	Detroit	97–104	Flynn Robinson (25)	19–14
34	December 26	@ Buffalo	121–104	Mike Riordan (23)	20–14
35	December 28	@ Atlanta	112–111	Mike Riordan (26)	21–14
36	December 29	Buffalo	118–109	Elvin Hayes (35)	21–15
37	December 30	@ New York	98–100	Elvin Hayes (23)	21–16
38	January 1	@ Milwaukee	88–87	Mike Riordan (23)	22–16
39	January 3	Cleveland	80–89	Elvin Hayes (26)	23–16
40	January 7	N Boston	116–98	Elvin Hayes (24)	23–17
41	January 9	@ Portland	105–93	Elvin Hayes (23)	24–17
42	January 10	@ Seattle	98–86	Mike Riordan (20)	25–17
43	January 14	@ Phoenix	95–94	Chenier, Riordan (22)	26–17
44	January 16	@ Los Angeles	112–104	Elvin Hayes (32)	27–17
45	January 19	N Philadelphia	94–110	Mike Riordan (23)	28–17
46	January 20	N Seattle	106–126	Phil Chenier (26)	29–17
47	January 21	Philadelphia	97–108	Elvin Hayes (33)	30–17
48	January 26	@ Chicago	100–110	Elvin Hayes (34)	30–18
49	January 27	Buffalo	87–115	Phil Chenier (23)	31–18
50	January 28	@ Cleveland	102–93	Elvin Hayes (25)	32–18
51	January 30	Golden State	86–104	Clark, Riordan (24)	33–18
52	February 2	New York	77–89	Wes Unseld (22)	34–18
53	February 4	N Los Angeles	125–115	Clark, Unseld (24)	34–19
54	February 6	@ Atlanta	106–112	Phil Chenier (30)	34–20
55	February 7	Atlanta	108–137	Elvin Hayes (28)	35–20
56	February 9	@ Buffalo	101–95	Chenier, Hayes (24)	36–20
57	February 11	@ Portland	102–97	Elvin Hayes (34)	37–20
58	February 14	@ Seattle	107–106	Elvin Hayes (27)	38–20
59	February 15	@ Golden State	96–94	Phil Chenier (26)	39–20
60	February 16	@ Los Angeles	103–121	Phil Chenier (20)	39–21
61	February 18	N Milwaukee	93–96	Archie Clark (25)	40–21
62	February 21	Phoenix	107–98	Elvin Hayes (33)	40–22
63	February 23	@ Detroit	105–107	Phil Chenier (27)	40–23
64	February 24	Portland	110–128	Archie Clark (31)	41–23
65	February 27	Cleveland	95–99	Chenier, Hayes (26)	42–23
66	February 28	@ Philadelphia	96–102	Phil Chenier (36)	42–24
67	March 3	@ New York	97–75	Elvin Hayes (23)	43–24
68	March 4	N New York	97–106	Archie Clark (24)	44–24
69	March 8	@ Kansas City–Omaha	93–105	Mike Riordan (27)	44–25
70	March 9	@ Houston	109–104	Archie Clark (26)	45–25
71	March 10	N Chicago	105–99	Hayes, Riordan (19)	45–26
72	March 13	Kansas City–Omaha	99–103	Phil Chenier (24)	46–26
73	March 14	@ Boston	107–111	Mike Riordan (34)	46–27
74	March 16	Boston	97–103	Elvin Hayes (29)	47–27
75	March 17	@ Philadelphia	120–115	Elvin Hayes (43)	48–27
76	March 18	Philadelphia	118–129	Archie Clark (27)	49–27
77	March 21	Houston	118–110	Archie Clark (24)	49–28
78	March 23	@ Cleveland	106–104	Archie Clark (33)	50–28
79	March 24	Cleveland	116–120 (OT)	Stan Love (28)	51–28
80	March 25	Atlanta	105–112	Mike Riordan (23)	52–28
81	March 27	Detroit	112–98	Mike Riordan (18)	52–29
82	March 28	@ Boston	101–120	Phil Chenier (20)	52–30

== Playoffs ==
1973 playoff game log
Conference Semi-finals: 1–4 (home: 1–1; road: 0–3)

Game	Date	Team	Score	High points	High rebounds	High assists	Location Attendance	Series
1	March 30	@ New York	L 83–95	Archie Clark (22)	Wes Unseld (16)	Archie Clark (6)	Madison Square Garden; 19,694	0–1
2	April 1	@ New York	L 103–123	Phil Chenier (27)	Wes Unseld (14)	Kevin Porter (7)	Madison Square Garden; 19,694	0–2
3	April 4	New York	L 96–103	Elvin Hayes (36)	Elvin Hayes (14)	Riordan, Clark (4)	Baltimore Civic Center; 12,289	0–3
4	April 6	New York	W 97–89	Elvin Hayes (34)	Hayes, Unseld (13)	Archie Clark (10)	Baltimore Civic Center; 12,289	1–3
5	April 8	@ New York	L 99–109	Archie Clark (30)	Wes Unseld (21)	Chenier, Unseld (4)	Madison Square Garden; 19,694	1–4

1973 schedule

== Awards and honors ==
- Elvin Hayes, All-NBA Second Team
- Mike Riordan, NBA All-Defensive Second Team
