= 1972–73 Atlanta Hawks season =

NBA professional basketball team season

- Head coach: Cotton Fitzsimmons
- Arena: Omni Coliseum

Results
- Record: 46–36 (.561)
- Place: Division: 2nd (Central); Conference: 4th (Eastern)
- Playoff finish: East Semifinals (Lost to Celtics 2–4)
- Stats at Basketball Reference

Local media
- Television: WTCG
- Radio: WSB

The 1972–73 Atlanta Hawks season was the Hawks' 24th season in the NBA and fifth season in Atlanta. The team moved their home games from the Alexander Memorial Coliseum to The Omni Coliseum. The Hawks registered a 46–36 record during the regular-season, but went 2–4 against the Boston Celtics in the Eastern Conference Semifinals.

== Roster ==
Atlanta Hawks roster
Players

Pos.	No.	Player	Height	Weight	DOB	From
C	8	Walt Bellamy	6 ft 11 in (2.11 m)	225 lb (102 kg)		Indiana
G	20	Steve Bracey	6 ft 2 in (1.88 m)	175 lb (79 kg)		Tulsa
C	31	Bob Christian	6 ft 10 in (2.08 m)	255 lb (116 kg)		Grambling State
G	3	Herm Gilliam	6 ft 3 in (1.91 m)	190 lb (86 kg)		Purdue
G/F	23	Lou Hudson	6 ft 5 in (1.96 m)	210 lb (95 kg)		Minnesota
G	44	Pete Maravich	6 ft 5 in (1.96 m)	197 lb (89 kg)		LSU
PF	26	Eddie Mast	6 ft 9 in (2.06 m)	220 lb (100 kg)		Temple
F/C	30	George Trapp	6 ft 8 in (2.03 m)	205 lb (93 kg)		Long Beach State
SF	22	John Tschogl	6 ft 6 in (1.98 m)	206 lb (93 kg)		UC Santa Barbara
F	12	Jim Washington	6 ft 6 in (1.98 m)	210 lb (95 kg)		Villanova
G/F	33	John Wetzel	6 ft 5 in (1.96 m)	190 lb (86 kg)		Virginia Tech

Coaches
Head coach
- Cotton Fitzsimmons

Legend
- (DP) Unsigned draft pick
- (FA) Free agent
- (S) Suspended
- Injured

== Regular season ==
Central Division	W	L	PCT	GB	Home	Road	Neutral	Div
y-Baltimore Bullets	52	30	.634	–	24–9	21–17	7–4	17–5
x-Atlanta Hawks	46	36	.561	6	28–13	17–23	1–0	10–12
Houston Rockets	33	49	.402	19	14–14	10–28	9–7	9–13
Cleveland Cavaliers	32	50	.390	20	20–21	10–27	2–2	8–14

#	Eastern Conference			
#	Team	W	L	PCT
1	z-Boston Celtics	68	14	.829
2	x-New York Knicks	57	25	.695
3	y-Baltimore Bullets	52	30	.634
4	x-Atlanta Hawks	46	36	.561
5	Houston Rockets	33	49	.402
6	Cleveland Cavaliers	32	50	.390
7	Buffalo Braves	21	61	.256
8	Philadelphia 76ers	9	73	.110

=== Game log ===
1972–73 Game log
#	Date	Opponent	Score	High points	Record
1	October 10	@ Buffalo	120–109	Pete Maravich (34)	1–0
2	October 13	@ Baltimore	98–115	Pete Maravich (27)	1–1
3	October 15	New York	101–109	Lou Hudson (32)	2–1
4	October 17	Boston	119–115	Lou Hudson (27)	2–2
5	October 20	@ Houston	108–120	Pete Maravich (39)	2–3
6	October 21	@ Kansas City–Omaha	101–108	Herm Gilliam (22)	2–4
7	October 24	@ Portland	118–110	Lou Hudson (27)	3–4
8	October 25	@ Seattle	118–115	Lou Hudson (33)	4–4
9	October 28	@ Golden State	107–122	Lou Hudson (28)	4–5
10	October 31	Houston	106–105	Walt Bellamy (23)	4–6
11	November 3	@ Houston	114–108	Hudson, Maravich (31)	5–6
12	November 4	Philadelphia	120–128	Pete Maravich (44)	6–6
13	November 7	Baltimore	107–109 (OT)	Pete Maravich (28)	7–6
14	November 9	@ New York	99–101	Pete Maravich (25)	7–7
15	November 11	Milwaukee	102–111	Lou Hudson (32)	8–7
16	November 14	Golden State	114–105	Lou Hudson (20)	8–8
17	November 18	Phoenix	122–126	Pete Maravich (45)	9–8
18	November 19	@ Cleveland	98–109	Lou Hudson (28)	9–9
19	November 21	@ Detroit	110–113 (OT)	Lou Hudson (26)	9–10
20	November 23	Seattle	97–110	Walt Bellamy (33)	10–10
21	November 25	Chicago	100–99	Lou Hudson (25)	10–11
22	November 26	@ Milwaukee	96–108	Pete Maravich (23)	10–12
23	November 29	@ Phoenix	98–109	Lou Hudson (30)	10–13
24	December 1	@ Los Angeles	114–109 (OT)	Pete Maravich (31)	11–13
25	December 2	@ Portland	106–103	Lou Hudson (25)	12–13
26	December 5	Portland	121–122	Pete Maravich (31)	13–13
27	December 7	@ Chicago	94–89 (OT)	Pete Maravich (39)	14–13
28	December 8	Baltimore	115–134	Pete Maravich (37)	15–13
29	December 10	@ Kansas City–Omaha	115–130	Lou Hudson (43)	15–14
30	December 12	@ New York	93–114	Lou Hudson (27)	15–15
31	December 13	New York	120–121	Pete Maravich (37)	16–15
32	December 16	Cleveland	94–100	Lou Hudson (26)	17–15
33	December 19	Kansas City–Omaha	102–119	Lou Hudson (27)	18–15
34	December 22	@ Buffalo	110–109	Lou Hudson (33)	19–15
35	December 23	Philadelphia	112–124	Pete Maravich (42)	20–15
36	December 26	@ Cleveland	96–115	Lou Hudson (27)	20–16
37	December 27	N Philadelphia	120–121	Lou Hudson (34)	21–16
38	December 28	Baltimore	112–111	Lou Hudson (26)	21–17
39	December 30	Buffalo	110–120	Pete Maravich (31)	22–17
40	January 2	@ Chicago	90–100	Pete Maravich (38)	22–18
41	January 3	@ Milwaukee	97–105	Walt Bellamy (23)	22–19
42	January 5	Boston	126–108	Steve Bracey (25)	22–20
43	January 6	@ Detroit	116–111	Pete Maravich (30)	23–20
44	January 9	Houston	114–120	Bellamy, Maravich (26)	24–20
45	January 11	New York	122–107	Pete Maravich (23)	24–21
46	January 12	@ Boston	109–133	Pete Maravich (26)	24–22
47	January 14	Los Angeles	102–100	Pete Maravich (28)	24–23
48	January 16	Detroit	129–130 (OT)	Lou Hudson (33)	25–23
49	January 17	@ Philadelphia	122–105	Pete Maravich (25)	26–23
50	January 18	Buffalo	127–125	Walt Bellamy (32)	26–24
51	January 20	Cleveland	84–96	Herm Gilliam (24)	27–24
52	January 26	@ Buffalo	118–82	Lou Hudson (31)	28–24
53	January 27	Kansas City–Omaha	126–129	Lou Hudson (35)	29–24
54	January 28	@ Houston	108–116	Lou Hudson (37)	29–25
55	January 30	Detroit	126–123	Pete Maravich (35)	29–26
56	February 2	@ Boston	100–99	Pete Maravich (37)	30–26
57	February 3	Buffalo	101–105	Lou Hudson (32)	31–26
58	February 6	Baltimore	106–112	Lou Hudson (36)	32–26
59	February 7	@ Baltimore	108–137	Pete Maravich (24)	32–27
60	February 8	Cleveland	136–132 (OT)	Lou Hudson (38)	32–28
61	February 10	Houston	91–103	Lou Hudson (29)	33–28
62	February 11	@ Cleveland	115–107	Lou Hudson (34)	34–28
63	February 16	@ Phoenix	111–104	Pete Maravich (40)	35–28
64	February 18	@ Los Angeles	99–92	Pete Maravich (31)	36–28
65	February 20	@ Golden State	115–118	Lou Hudson (38)	36–29
66	February 23	@ Seattle	120–124	Lou Hudson (39)	36–30
67	February 27	Seattle	130–131	Pete Maravich (38)	37–30
68	March 2	@ Philadelphia	130–107	Lou Hudson (29)	38–30
69	March 3	Houston	125–136	Walt Bellamy (33)	39–30
70	March 4	Philadelphia	130–138	Pete Maravich (38)	40–30
71	March 8	Portland	129–135	Pete Maravich (39)	41–30
72	March 10	Golden State	113–117	Lou Hudson (27)	42–30
73	March 11	@ Houston	118–129	Pete Maravich (35)	42–31
74	March 13	@ Cleveland	107–115	Pete Maravich (31)	42–32
75	March 16	Phoenix	127–135	Lou Hudson (38)	43–32
76	March 18	Milwaukee	105–104	Lou Hudson (28)	43–33
77	March 20	Los Angeles	112–114	Lou Hudson (34)	44–33
78	March 21	@ New York	98–93	Lou Hudson (32)	45–33
79	March 23	@ Boston	108–124	Pete Maravich (29)	45–34
80	March 24	Chicago	111–113	Lou Hudson (32)	46–34
81	March 25	@ Baltimore	105–112	Walt Bellamy (30)	46–35
82	March 27	Boston	117–110	Pete Maravich (30)	46–36

== Playoffs ==
1973 playoff game log
Conference Semifinals: 2–4 (home: 1–2; road: 1–2)

Game	Date	Team	Score	High points	High rebounds	High assists	Location Attendance	Series
1	April 1	@ Boston	L 109–134	Lou Hudson (28)	Jim Washington (14)	Hudson, Maravich (5)	Boston Garden; 11,907	0–1
2	April 4	Boston	L 113–126	Pete Maravich (34)	Walt Bellamy (11)	Pete Maravich (10)	Omni Coliseum; 11,588	0–2
3	April 6	@ Boston	W 118–105	Lou Hudson (37)	Walt Bellamy (12)	Pete Maravich (11)	Boston Garden; 15,320	1–2
4	April 8	Boston	W 97–94	Pete Maravich (37)	Jim Washington (15)	Herm Gilliam (7)	Omni Coliseum; 11,675	2–2
5	April 11	@ Boston	L 101–108	Pete Maravich (34)	Walt Bellamy (16)	Herm Gilliam (6)	Boston Garden; 12,525	2–3
6	April 13	Boston	L 103–121	Lou Hudson (35)	Washington, Bellamy (13)	Bellamy, Gilliam (5)	Omni Coliseum; 16,181	2–4

1973 schedule

== Awards and records ==
- Pete Maravich, All-NBA Second Team
