= 1972–73 Boston Celtics season =

NBA basketball team season

- Division champions
- Head coach: Tom Heinsohn
- General manager: Red Auerbach
- Arena: Boston Garden

Results
- Record: 68–14 (.829)
- Place: Division: 1st (Atlantic); Conference: 1st (Eastern)
- Playoff finish: Conference finals (lost to Knicks 3–4)
- Stats at Basketball Reference

Local media
- Television: WSMW
- Radio: WBZ

The 1972–73 Boston Celtics season was their 27th in the National Basketball Association (NBA). The Celtics finished the season with the best record in the league, and currently in franchise history, at 68–14, one win shy of the then-record set by the Los Angeles Lakers the previous season. Third-year center Dave Cowens won the NBA Most Valuable Player Award ahead of Kareem Abdul-Jabbar and future Celtic Tiny Archibald. They also won the Atlantic Division for the second consecutive season.

In the Eastern Conference finals, the Celtics lost to the eventual NBA champion New York Knicks in seven games, marking the second consecutive year Boston was eliminated by New York.

== Draft picks ==
Round	Pick	Player	Position	Nationality	College
1	10	Paul Westphal	PG/SG	United States	USC
2	27	Dennis Wuycik	SF	United States	North Carolina
3	44	Wayne Grabiec	G	United States	Michigan
4	61	Nate Stephens	C	United States	Long Beach State
5	77	Bryan Adrian	G	United States	Davidson
6	94	Don Holcomb	C	United States	Memphis
6	96	Wally Rice	G	United States	Widener
7	111	Steve Previs	PG	United States	North Carolina
8	127	Sam McCamey	F	United States	Oral Roberts
10	154	Marty Hunt	G	United States	Kenyon
11	165	Mark Minor	SF	United States	Ohio State
12	173	Phil Stephens	C	United States	South Carolina State

== Roster ==
Boston Celtics roster
Players

Pos.	No.	Player	Height	Weight	DOB	From
G	12	Don Chaney	6 ft 5 in (1.96 m)	210 lb (95 kg)		Houston
C	18	Dave Cowens	6 ft 9 in (2.06 m)	230 lb (104 kg)		Florida State
C	29	Henry Finkel	7 ft 0 in (2.13 m)	240 lb (109 kg)		Dayton
G/F	17	John Havlicek	6 ft 5 in (1.96 m)	203 lb (92 kg)		Ohio State
F/C	11	Steve Kuberski	6 ft 8 in (2.03 m)	215 lb (98 kg)		Bradley
F	19	Don Nelson	6 ft 6 in (1.98 m)	210 lb (95 kg)		Iowa
F	16	Tom Sanders	6 ft 6 in (1.98 m)	210 lb (95 kg)		NYU
F	35	Paul Silas	6 ft 7 in (2.01 m)	220 lb (100 kg)		Creighton
G	44	Paul Westphal	6 ft 4 in (1.93 m)	195 lb (88 kg)		USC
G	10	Jo Jo White	6 ft 3 in (1.91 m)	190 lb (86 kg)		Kansas
G	7	Art Williams	6 ft 1 in (1.85 m)	180 lb (82 kg)		Cal Poly Pomona

Coaches
Head coach
- Tom Heinsohn
Assistant(s)
- John Killilea

Legend
- (DP) Unsigned draft pick
- (FA) Free agent
- (S) Suspended
- Injured

== Regular season ==
=== Season standings ===
Atlantic Division	W	L	PCT	GB	Home	Road	Neutral	Div
y-Boston Celtics	68	14	.829	–	33–6	32–8	3–0	18–4
x-New York Knicks	57	25	.695	11	35–6	21–18	1–1	16–6
Buffalo Braves	21	61	.256	47	14–27	6–31	1–3	8–14
Philadelphia 76ers	9	73	.110	59	5–26	2–36	2–11	2–20

#	Eastern Conference			
#	Team	W	L	PCT
1	z-Boston Celtics	68	14	.829
2	x-New York Knicks	57	25	.695
3	y-Baltimore Bullets	52	30	.634
4	x-Atlanta Hawks	46	36	.561
5	Houston Rockets	33	49	.402
6	Cleveland Cavaliers	32	50	.390
7	Buffalo Braves	21	61	.256
8	Philadelphia 76ers	9	73	.110

=== Game log ===
1972–73 game log
#	Date	Opponent	Score	High points	Record
1	October 11	@ Detroit	121–108	John Havlicek (29)	1–0
2	October 13	Los Angeles	104–112	John Havlicek (30)	2–0
3	October 14	@ Chicago	96–88	John Havlicek (21)	3–0
4	October 17	@ Atlanta	119–115	Dave Cowens (29)	4–0
5	October 20	Buffalo	118–126	Dave Cowens (24)	5–0
6	October 21	@ Baltimore	104–101	Jo Jo White (36)	6–0
7	October 23	Philadelphia	85–105	Dave Cowens (21)	7–0
8	October 24	@ Buffalo	105–97	Jo Jo White (28)	8–0
9	October 27	Cleveland	97–123	Jo Jo White (20)	9–0
10	November 3	Baltimore	96–109	Havlicek, White (22)	10–0
11	November 4	Kansas City–Omaha	118–107	John Havlicek (36)	10–1
12	November 8	Golden State	111–128	John Havlicek (25)	11–1
13	November 10	@ Buffalo	106–104	Jo Jo White (22)	12–1
14	November 11	Detroit	118–121	John Havlicek (37)	13–1
15	November 15	Phoenix	94–113	Dave Cowens (25)	14–1
16	November 17	Milwaukee	95–88	John Havlicek (30)	14–2
17	November 21	@ Milwaukee	116–102	John Havlicek (27)	15–2
18	November 22	Portland	107–126	Dave Cowens (33)	16–2
19	November 24	New York	97–114	Dave Cowens (23)	17–2
20	November 25	@ New York	94–97	John Havlicek (24)	17–3
21	November 29	Seattle	98–120	John Havlicek (22)	18–3
22	December 1	@ Philadelphia	105–99	Jo Jo White (31)	19–3
23	December 2	Philadelphia	120–131	Jo Jo White (30)	20–3
24	December 8	@ Cleveland	96–87	Dave Cowens (25)	21–3
25	December 9	Cleveland	88–123	John Havlicek (23)	22–3
26	December 13	@ Phoenix	105–100	Jo Jo White (26)	23–3
27	December 15	@ Los Angeles	102–98	Dave Cowens (31)	24–3
28	December 16	@ Portland	123–116	Dave Cowens (33)	25–3
29	December 17	@ Seattle	123–98	John Havlicek (27)	26–3
30	December 19	@ Golden State	112–115	Jo Jo White (30)	26–4
31	December 22	@ Kansas City–Omaha	118–90	Dave Cowens (26)	27–4
32	December 23	@ Milwaukee	98–104	John Havlicek (24)	27–5
33	December 26	New York	106–115	Dave Cowens (38)	28–5
34	December 29	Chicago	106–99	Dave Cowens (27)	28–6
35	December 30	N Philadelphia	107–117	John Havlicek (28)	29–6
36	January 2	@ Houston	130–110	John Havlicek (25)	30–6
37	January 3	@ Houston	112–123	John Havlicek (32)	30–7
38	January 5	@ Atlanta	126–108	John Havlicek (30)	31–7
39	January 7	N Baltimore	116–98	John Havlicek (33)	32–7
40	January 10	Houston	107–128	John Havlicek (22)	33–7
41	January 12	Atlanta	109–133	John Havlicek (25)	34–7
42	January 13	@ Philadelphia	111–95	Jo Jo White (29)	35–7
43	January 16	@ Buffalo	106–102	John Havlicek (33)	36–7
44	January 17	Portland	99–117	Dave Cowens (35)	37–7
45	January 19	Seattle	104–124	Jo Jo White (33)	38–7
46	January 21	Buffalo	97–104	John Havlicek (26)	39–7
47	January 26	Houston	126–139	Dave Cowens (24)	40–7
48	January 27	@ New York	108–111	John Havlicek (25)	40–8
49	January 28	New York	96–93	John Havlicek (25)	40–9
50	January 31	Cleveland	89–94	Don Chaney (26)	41–9
51	February 2	Atlanta	100–99	John Havlicek (30)	41–10
52	February 3	@ Philadelphia	104–100	Jo Jo White (20)	42–10
53	February 4	Philadelphia	115–123	Jo Jo White (38)	43–10
54	February 6	@ Cleveland	105–110	Don Nelson (30)	43–11
55	February 7	Los Angeles	112–113 (OT)	Dave Cowens (34)	44–11
56	February 9	Detroit	104–95	Jo Jo White (24)	44–12
57	February 11	Milwaukee	96–120	Dave Cowens (28)	45–12
58	February 13	@ Chicago	105–101	John Havlicek (31)	46–12
59	February 14	@ Kansas City–Omaha	104–101	John Havlicek (28)	47–12
60	February 16	@ Portland	112–105	Jo Jo White (36)	48–12
61	February 17	@ Golden State	110–106	John Havlicek (33)	49–12
62	February 18	@ Seattle	106–105	Jo Jo White (26)	50–12
63	February 20	Phoenix	97–107	John Havlicek (26)	51–12
64	February 25	@ Cleveland	105–92	Dave Cowens (22)	52–12
65	February 27	@ New York	91–123	Don Chaney (18)	52–13
66	February 28	Golden State	111–118	Don Chaney (32)	53–13
67	March 2	@ Detroit	115–101	Jo Jo White (25)	54–13
68	March 4	Buffalo	113–125	Paul Silas (26)	55–13
69	March 6	@ Buffalo	127–112	Havlicek, White (25)	56–13
70	March 8	@ Phoenix	141–134 (OT)	Dave Cowens (32)	57–13
71	March 9	@ Los Angeles	119–111	Dave Cowens (34)	58–13
72	March 11	New York	107–122	John Havlicek (32)	59–13
73	March 14	Baltimore	107–111	Havlicek, White (27)	60–13
74	March 16	@ Baltimore	97–103	Dave Cowens (23)	60–14
75	March 18	Kansas City–Omaha	105–109	John Havlicek (28)	61–14
76	March 20	N Houston	89–94	John Havlicek (28)	62–14
77	March 21	Chicago	105–106	John Havlicek (27)	63–14
78	March 23	Atlanta	108–124	Don Chaney (22)	64–14
79	March 24	@ New York	108–103	Dave Cowens (29)	65–14
80	March 25	@ Houston	125–121	Dave Cowens (28)	66–14
81	March 27	@ Atlanta	117–110	John Havlicek (29)	67–14
82	March 28	Baltimore	101–120	John Havlicek (34)	68–14

== Playoffs ==
1973 playoff game log
Conference semifinals: 4–2 (home: 2–1; road: 2–1)

Game	Date	Team	Score	High points	High rebounds	High assists	Location Attendance	Series
1	April 1	Atlanta	W 134–109	John Havlicek (54)	Dave Cowens (17)	Art Williams (12)	Boston Garden; 11,907	1–0
2	April 4	@ Atlanta	W 126–113	John Havlicek (29)	Dave Cowens (25)	Jo Jo White (11)	Omni Coliseum; 11,588	2–0
3	April 6	Atlanta	L 105–118	Jo Jo White (23)	Dave Cowens (18)	Jo Jo White (10)	Boston Garden; 15,320	2–1
4	April 8	@ Atlanta	L 94–97	John Havlicek (21)	Paul Silas (22)	John Havlicek (5)	Omni Coliseum; 11,675	2–2
5	April 11	Atlanta	W 108–101	John Havlicek (32)	Dave Cowens (20)	John Havlicek (11)	Boston Garden; 12,525	3–2
6	April 13	@ Atlanta	W 121–103	Jo Jo White (33)	Paul Silas (17)	Jo Jo White (7)	Omni Coliseum; 16,181	4–2

Conference finals: 3–4 (home: 2–2; road: 1–2)

Game	Date	Team	Score	High points	High rebounds	High assists	Location Attendance	Series
1	April 15	New York	W 134–108	Jo Jo White (30)	Dave Cowens (15)	John Havlicek (11)	Boston Garden; 15,320	1–0
2	April 18	@ New York	L 96–129	John Havlicek (21)	Dave Cowens (13)	John Havlicek (11)	Madison Square Garden; 19,694	1–1
3	April 20	New York	L 91–98	John Havlicek (29)	Paul Silas (14)	John Havlicek (6)	Boston Garden; 15,320	1–2
4	April 22	@ New York	L 110–117 (2OT)	Jo Jo White (34)	Paul Silas (23)	Jo Jo White (6)	Madison Square Garden; 19,694	1–3
5	April 25	New York	W 98–97	Dave Cowens (32)	Paul Silas (20)	Jo Jo White (7)	Boston Garden; 15,320	2–3
6	April 27	@ New York	W 110–100	Dave Cowens (26)	Dave Cowens (14)	Jo Jo White (7)	Madison Square Garden; 19,694	3–3
7	April 29	New York	L 78–94	Dave Cowens (24)	Paul Silas (16)	Dave Cowens (5)	Boston Garden; 15,320	3–4

1973 schedule

== Awards, records and milestones ==
- Most Valuable Player: Dave Cowens, Boston Celtics
- Coach of the Year: Tom Heinsohn, Boston Celtics
- All-NBA First Team:
  - John Havlicek, Boston Celtics
- NBA All-Defensive Team:
- First Team:
  - John Havlicek, Boston Celtics
- Second Team:
  - Paul Silas, Boston Celtics
  - Don Chaney, Boston Celtics
