= 1972–73 Houston Rockets season =

- Head coach: Tex Winter (fired); Johnny Egan
- General manager: Ray Patterson
- Owners: Wayne Duddlesten; Billy Goldberg; Mickey Herskowitz
- Arena: Hofheinz Pavilion

Results
- Record: 33–49 (.402)
- Place: Division: 3rd (Central); Conference: 5th (Eastern)
- Playoff finish: Did not qualify
- Stats at Basketball Reference

Local media
- Television: KHTV
- Radio: KPRC

The 1972–73 Houston Rockets season was the Rockets' 6th season in the NBA and 2nd season in the city of Houston.

== Roster ==
Houston Rockets roster
Players

Pos.	No.	Player	Height	Weight	DOB	From
F	24	Jack Marin	6 ft 6 in (1.98 m)	210 lb (95 kg)		Duke
SG	40	Stan McKenzie	6 ft 5 in (1.96 m)	195 lb (88 kg)		NYU
F/C	20	Otto Moore	6 ft 11 in (2.11 m)	205 lb (93 kg)		Texas–Pan American
G	23	Calvin Murphy	5 ft 9 in (1.75 m)	165 lb (75 kg)		Niagara
G	14	Mike Newlin	6 ft 4 in (1.93 m)	200 lb (91 kg)		Utah
F	6	Don Smith	6 ft 9 in (2.06 m)	235 lb (107 kg)		Iowa State
F	45	Rudy Tomjanovich	6 ft 8 in (2.03 m)	218 lb (99 kg)		Michigan
G	11	Jimmy Walker	6 ft 3 in (1.91 m)	195 lb (88 kg)		Providence

Coaches
Head coach
- Johnny Egan

Legend
- (DP) Unsigned draft pick
- (FA) Free agent
- (S) Suspended
- Injured

== Regular season ==
=== Season standings ===
Central Division	W	L	PCT	GB	Home	Road	Neutral	Div
y-Baltimore Bullets	52	30	.634	–	24–9	21–17	7–4	17–5
x-Atlanta Hawks	46	36	.561	6	28–13	17–23	1–0	10–12
Houston Rockets	33	49	.402	19	14–14	10–28	9–7	9–13
Cleveland Cavaliers	32	50	.390	20	20–21	10–27	2–2	8–14

#	Eastern Conference			
#	Team	W	L	PCT
1	z-Boston Celtics	68	14	.829
2	x-New York Knicks	57	25	.695
3	y-Baltimore Bullets	52	30	.634
4	x-Atlanta Hawks	46	36	.561
5	Houston Rockets	33	49	.402
6	Cleveland Cavaliers	32	50	.390
7	Buffalo Braves	21	61	.256
8	Philadelphia 76ers	9	73	.110

=== Game log ===
1972–73 Game log
#	Date	Opponent	Score	High points	Record
1	October 13	@ Cleveland	109–108	Rudy Tomjanovich (21)	1–0
2	October 14	@ Buffalo	121–113	Mike Newlin (25)	2–0
3	October 17	@ New York	95–103	Marin, Walker (21)	2–1
4	October 20	Atlanta	108–120	Jimmy Walker (29)	3–1
5	October 21	Chicago	130–97	Calvin Murphy (18)	3–2
6	October 25	N Los Angeles	112–107	Don Smith (Note: Changed his name to Zaid Abdul-Aziz in 1976.) (23)	3–3
7	October 27	Detroit	118–130	Jimmy Walker (30)	4–3
8	October 31	@ Atlanta	106–105	Jack Marin (26)	5–3
9	November 1	@ Philadelphia	108–104	Rudy Tomjanovich (23)	6–3
10	November 3	Atlanta	114–108	Cliff Meely (21)	6–4
11	November 4	N Detroit	118–108	Otto Moore (30)	7–4
12	November 7	@ Los Angeles	109–122	Mike Newlin (30)	7–5
13	November 10	@ Phoenix	109–115	Jimmy Walker (24)	7–6
14	November 11	N Philadelphia	114–112	Jack Marin (30)	7–7
15	November 14	@ Baltimore	103–104	Jack Marin (31)	7–8
16	November 16	@ New York	100–119	Jack Marin (22)	7–9
17	November 18	@ Kansas City–Omaha	117–127	Jimmy Walker (26)	7–10
18	November 21	@ Chicago	105–113	Jimmy Walker (30)	7–11
19	November 22	Golden State	104–132	Jack Marin (27)	8–11
20	November 25	Seattle	109–114	Jack Marin (28)	9–11
21	November 28	N Baltimore	90–108	Murphy, Walker (23)	9–12
22	November 29	N Baltimore	102–94	Jack Marin (21)	10–12
23	December 1	@ Baltimore	96–103	Jack Marin (20)	10–13
24	December 2	Kansas City–Omaha	114–109	Jimmy Walker (32)	10–14
25	December 5	@ Golden State	101–108	Rudy Tomjanovich (22)	10–15
26	December 8	Portland	108–114	Jimmy Walker (24)	11–15
27	December 12	@ Buffalo	94–95	Marin, Moore (20)	11–16
28	December 15	@ Baltimore	91–94	Jimmy Walker (21)	11–17
29	December 16	@ Detroit	123–112	Jimmy Walker (30)	12–17
30	December 17	@ Cleveland	110–109	Jack Marin (35)	13–17
31	December 20	N New York	124–102	Jimmy Walker (25)	13–18
32	December 22	Philadelphia	103–116	Jack Marin (29)	14–18
33	December 26	Phoenix	110–113	Rudy Tomjanovich (31)	15–18
34	December 27	Los Angeles	104–136	Mike Newlin (24)	16–18
35	December 29	Milwaukee	114–101	Jack Marin (25)	16–19
36	January 2	Boston	130–110	Jimmy Walker (25)	16–20
37	January 3	Boston	112–123	Mike Newlin (29)	17–20
38	January 4	@ Chicago	97–111	Rudy Tomjanovich (26)	17–21
39	January 6	@ New York	106–116	Jack Marin (24)	17–22
40	January 7	@ Cleveland	97–102	Marin, Walker (22)	17–23
41	January 9	@ Atlanta	114–120	Tomjanovich, Walker (25)	17–24
42	January 10	@ Boston	107–128	Calvin Murphy (20)	17–25
43	January 12	New York	104–103	Smith, Tomjanovich (20)	17–26
44	January 13	Cleveland	123–115	Calvin Murphy (20)	17–27
45	January 17	N Golden State	117–123	Don Smith (21)	17–28
46	January 19	Cleveland	108–104	Mike Newlin (24)	17–29
47	January 20	Portland	130–115	Meely, Murphy (19)	17–30
48	January 21	New York	103–107	Mike Newlin (25)	18–30
49	January 25	N Milwaukee	125–129	Rudy Tomjanovich (29)	19–30
50	January 26	@ Boston	126–139	Calvin Murphy (27)	19–31
51	January 28	Atlanta	108–116	Jimmy Walker (28)	20–31
52	January 30	@ Portland	123–120	Rudy Tomjanovich (31)	21–31
53	January 31	@ Seattle	109–118	Rudy Tomjanovich (25)	21–32
54	February 2	@ Los Angeles	109–126	Mike Newlin (30)	21–33
55	February 3	@ Phoenix	123–132	Rudy Tomjanovich (27)	21–34
56	February 4	N Buffalo	130–118	Jack Marin (30)	22–34
57	February 6	N Philadelphia	117–123	Rudy Tomjanovich (35)	23–34
58	February 9	Kansas City–Omaha	121–116	Jack Marin (35)	23–35
59	February 10	@ Atlanta	91–103	Rudy Tomjanovich (24)	23–36
60	February 13	@ Kansas City–Omaha	118–132	Mike Newlin (34)	23–37
61	February 16	@ Milwaukee	103–105	Rudy Tomjanovich (29)	23–38
62	February 17	Phoenix	111–127	Rudy Tomjanovich (28)	24–38
63	February 18	Chicago	110–99	Rudy Tomjanovich (22)	24–39
64	February 21	N Seattle	107–139	Rudy Tomjanovich (37)	25–39
65	February 23	N Philadelphia	116–138	Jack Marin (30)	26–39
66	February 25	@ Detroit	112–129	Mike Newlin (24)	26–40
67	February 27	@ Buffalo	112–105	Mike Newlin (29)	27–40
68	March 3	@ Atlanta	125–136	Rudy Tomjanovich (32)	27–41
69	March 4	Milwaukee	116–101	Jack Marin (19)	27–42
70	March 7	N Cleveland	100–118	Rudy Tomjanovich (25)	27–43
71	March 9	Baltimore	109–104	Murphy, Newlin (21)	27–44
72	March 10	Cleveland	116–131	Rudy Tomjanovich (34)	28–44
73	March 11	Atlanta	118–129	Jack Marin (35)	29–44
74	March 15	@ Golden State	125–141	Rudy Tomjanovich (37)	29–45
75	March 16	@ Portland	128–141	Rudy Tomjanovich (28)	29–46
76	March 18	@ Seattle	112–121	Tomjanovich, Walker (27)	29–47
77	March 20	N Boston	89–94	Rudy Tomjanovich (21)	29–48
78	March 21	@ Baltimore	118–110	Rudy Tomjanovich (26)	30–48
79	March 23	@ Philadelphia	132–112	Rudy Tomjanovich (28)	31–48
80	March 25	Boston	125–121	Mike Newlin (36)	31–49
81	March 27	N Buffalo	121–111	Rudy Tomjanovich (25)	32–49
82	March 28	N Buffalo	138–122	Calvin Murphy (31)	33–49
