= List of Portland Trail Blazers seasons =

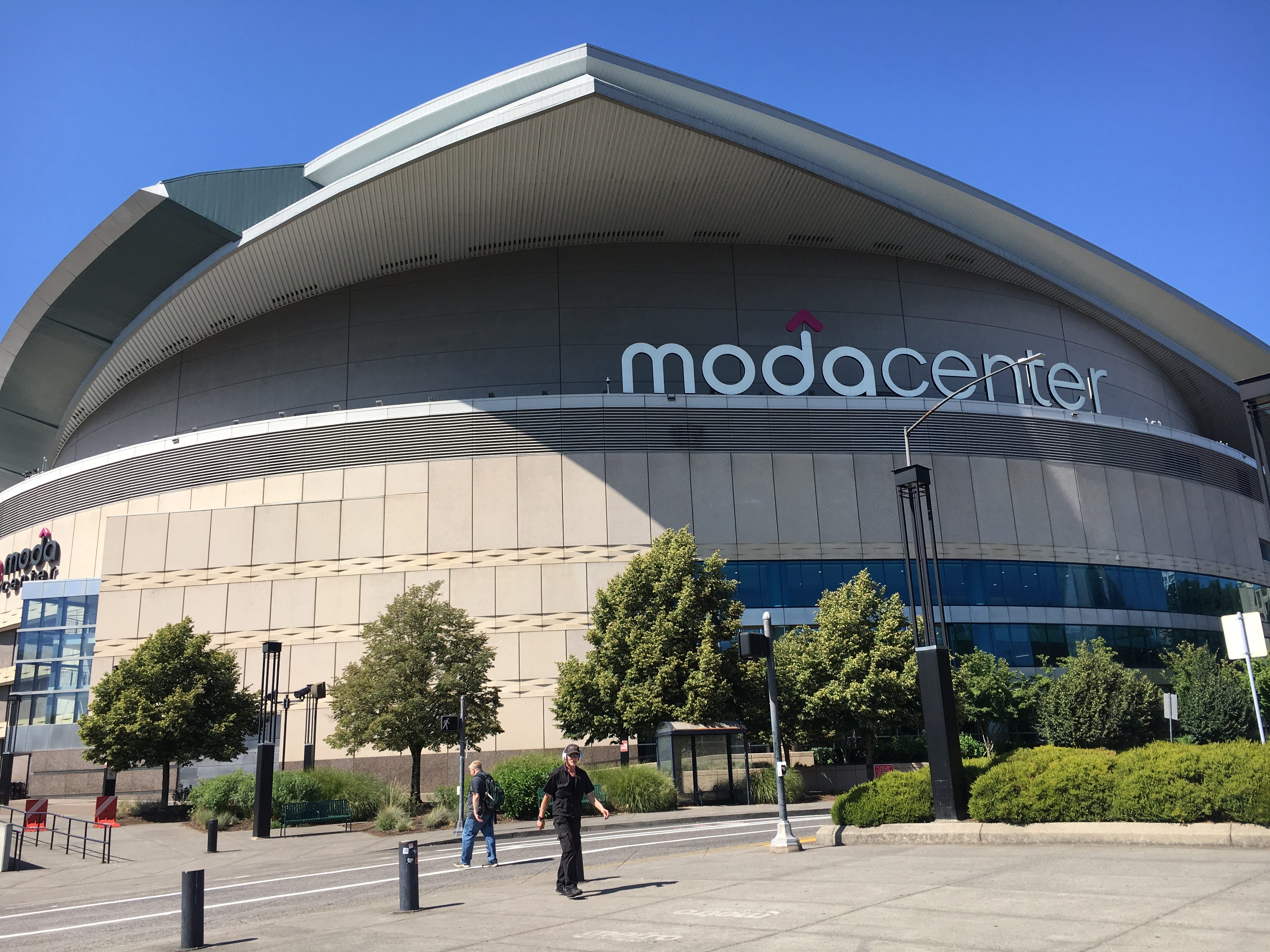
The Portland Trail Blazers have played their home games at the Moda Center since it opened in 1995.

The Portland Trail Blazers are an American professional basketball team based in Portland, Oregon, that competes in the National Basketball Association (NBA) as a member of the Northwest Division of the Western Conference. (Note: The Blazers were members of the Pacific Division from their initial season until after the 2003–04 season, when the Northwest Division was formed as a result of conference realignment with the Charlotte Bobcats joining as the NBA's 30th franchise.) The team played its home games in the Memorial Coliseum before moving to the Moda Center in 1995 (called the Rose Garden until 2013). The franchise entered the league as an expansion team in 1970, and has enjoyed a strong following: from 1977 through 1995, the team sold out 814 consecutive home games, the longest such streak in American major professional sports at the time. The team's rallying cry is "Rip City", coined by play-by-play announcer Bill Schonely during their inaugural season.

Harry Glickman became interested in creating an NBA team in his hometown of Portland when Memorial Coliseum opened in 1960, but the NBA commissioner at the time, Maurice Podoloff, refused on the grounds that Portland was too far west. However, Podoloff's successor, J. Walter Kennedy, expanded the league into the West throughout the 1960s. On February 6, 1970, the NBA board of governors granted Portland – along with Buffalo, New York, and Cleveland – the rights to a franchise in return for a US$3.7 million admission. To name the team, management held a contest and received more than 10,000 entries. The name "Trail Blazers" was suggested by 172 people, and was ultimately selected by a drawing on March 13. Blake Byrne, the general sales manager of KPTV at the time, was the winner of the drawing and received two season tickets for the inaugural season. Derived from the trail blazing activity by explorers making paths through forests, Glickman considered it a name that could "reflect both the ruggedness of the Pacific Northwest and the start of a major league era in our state".

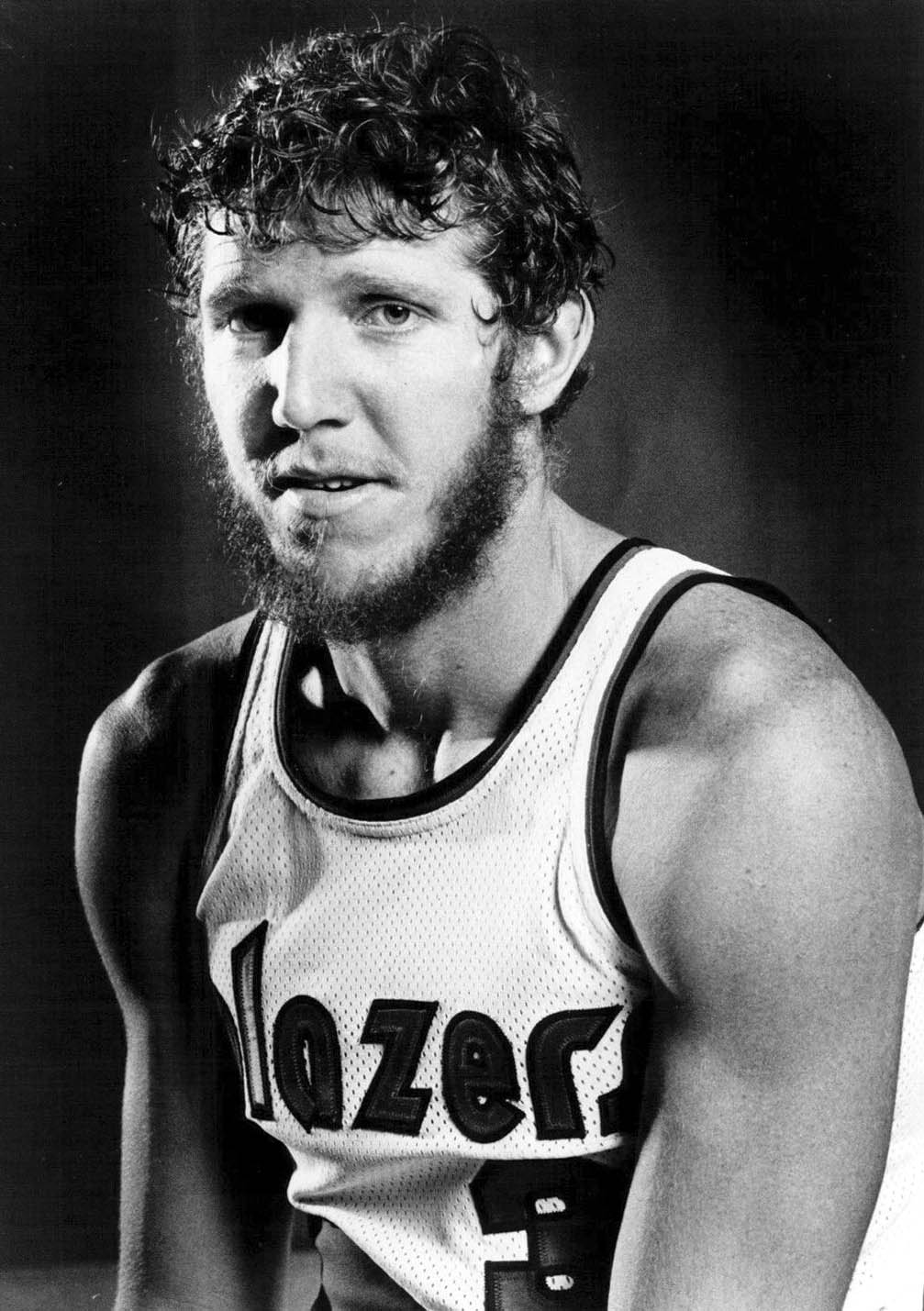
Bill Walton played for the Blazers from 1974 to 1979.

The Blazers selected the first players to join their team in the 1970 NBA draft. The team chose Geoff Petrie eighth overall, making him the first draft pick in franchise history. A couple months later, they took part in the 1970 NBA expansion draft to further fill out their inaugural roster. The Blazers played their first game on October 16, 1970 against fellow expansion team the Cleveland Cavaliers, which they won 115–112. The team went on to have a season record of 29 wins and 53 losses, with Petrie winning co-Rookie of the Year, sharing the honor with Dave Cowens of the Boston Celtics. The Blazers had the third worst record in the NBA that season, only ahead of the Cavaliers and the season's other expansion team, the Buffalo Braves. In their second season, they had just 18 wins to go along with 64 losses which still remains as the fewest wins in a season in franchise history. Led by head coach Jack Ramsay, the Blazers had their first winning record during the 1976–77 season, in which they made the playoffs for the first time, and went on to win the 1977 NBA Finals against the Philadelphia 76ers 4–2. They were the second team in NBA history to come back from an 0—2 deficit in the Finals to win the series, and the first team to win four straight games after losing the first two. Bill Walton was named the Finals MVP. The following season, Walton was named the NBA MVP after leading the Blazers to the best record in the league with 58 wins and 24 losses. The team was unable to defend their title, losing to the Seattle SuperSonics in the conference semifinals.

In the 1980s, the Blazers made the playoffs every season except 1981–82. In the 1983 draft, the team selected Clyde Drexler 14th overall, who would greatly contribute to the team's playoff streak, becoming one of the best players in franchise history. After multiple consecutive seasons of first round losses in the playoffs, the Ramsay era ended after the 1986 season, and Ramsay was replaced by Mike Schuler. Schuler only lasted two and a half years before he was fired during the 1988–89 season and replaced by former Blazers player Rick Adelman. In his first full season, Adelman led the Blazers to the 1990 NBA Finals, but the team lost 4–1 to the Detroit Pistons. Adelman led the team to a franchise record 63 wins in the 1990–91 season, but the team was unable to return to the Finals, and were defeated 4–2 by the Los Angeles Lakers in the conference finals. However, the Blazers made their third Finals appearance in franchise history in 1992, but were defeated 4–2 by the Chicago Bulls, led by Michael Jordan. The next six seasons saw the Blazers lose in the first round of the playoffs. In his second season in charge, Mike Dunleavy was named Coach of the Year. Dunleavey led the team to back-to-back conference finals appearances in 1999 and 2000, with the team getting swept by the San Antonio Spurs in 1999, and then falling one game short of the 2000 NBA Finals, losing to the Lakers 4–3.

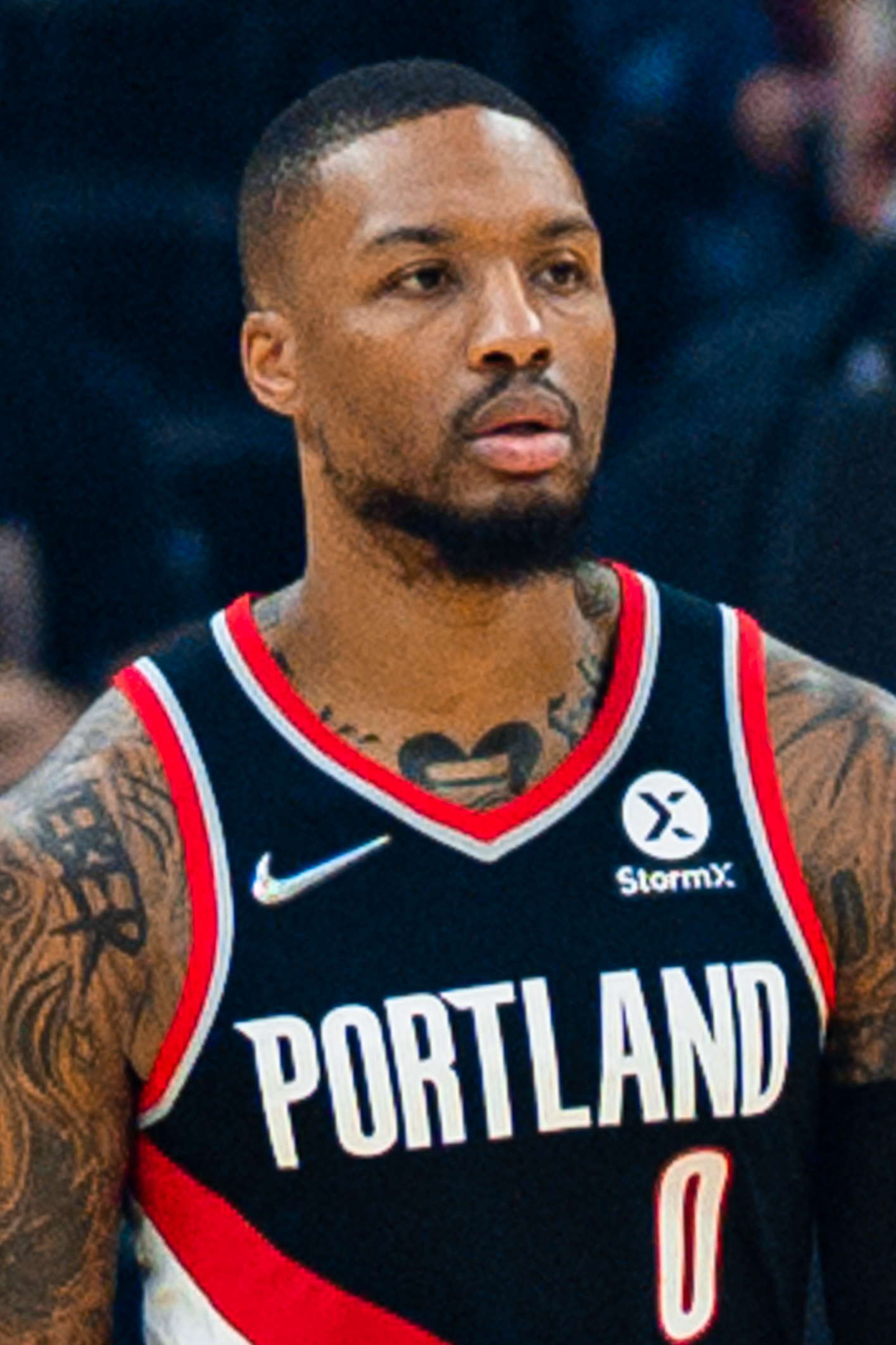
Damian Lillard has played for the Blazers since 2012, except from 2023 to 2025.

The Blazers went on a stretch of either missing the playoffs or losing in the first round for the rest of the 2000s through the mid-2010s. Damian Lillard was selected in the 2012 NBA draft, and won Rookie of the Year. In the 2014 playoffs, Lillard lead the Blazers to their first playoff series win in 14 years with a game-winning shot at the buzzer in game 6 against the Houston Rockets, winning the series 4–2. The team ultimately lost in the next round 4–1 to the Spurs. The next seven seasons saw the team make the playoffs. In the first round of the 2019 playoffs, Lillard had another series-winning buzzer beater, this time against the Oklahoma City Thunder. The team made it to the conference finals, but were swept by the Golden State Warriors. The following two seasons saw the Blazers make the playoffs, but lose in the first round. Chauncey Billups was hired as the head coach before the 2021–22 season, with the team having a losing record each season he coached. On October 23, 2025, Billups was arrested as part of an ongoing federal gambling investigation by the FBI. As a result, the Blazers named Tiago Splitter as the interim head coach for the remainder of the season.

In their 56 seasons (through the 2025–26 season) as an NBA franchise, the Blazers have an all-time regular season record of 2,370 wins and 2,156 losses; in the playoffs, they have 120 wins and 159 losses. The team has had 33 winning seasons, 20 losing seasons, and 3 seasons with a 41–41 record. The Blazers have reached the postseason 38 times, including a streak of 21 straight appearances from 1983 through 2003. The franchise's all-time points leader is Damian Lillard with 19,376; he also holds the team record for the most three-point field goals made with 2,387.

== Table key ==
Key to colors

Table key
| † | NBA champions |
| * | Conference champions |
| ^ | Division champions |
| ¤ | Playoff berth |
| × | Play-in berth |

Key to abbreviations

- Finish – final position in league or division standings
- W – number of regular season wins
- L – number of regular season losses
- Pct. – winning percentage
- GB – games behind first-place team in division

Key to awards

- AMVP – All-Star Game Most Valuable Player
- COY – Coach of the Year
- CPOY – Comeback Player of the Year
- DPOY – Defensive Player of the Year
- EOY – Executive of the Year
- FMVP – Finals Most Valuable Player
- JWKC – J. Walter Kennedy Citizenship Award
- MIP – Most Improved Player
- ROY – Rookie of the Year
- SMOY – Sixth Man of the Year
- SPOR – Sportsmanship Award

== Seasons ==
Portland Trail Blazers record by season, 1970–2026
| Season | Conference | Finish | Division | Finish | Regular season | | | | Playoff results | Awards | Head coach | Ref. |
| Season | Conference | Finish | Division | Finish | W | L | Pct. | GB | Playoff results | Awards | Head coach | Ref. |
|---|---|---|---|---|---|---|---|---|---|---|---|---|
| 1970–71 | Western | 9th | Pacific | 5th | 29 | 53 | .354 | 19 | Did not qualify | Geoff Petrie (ROY) | Rolland Todd | |
| 1971–72 | Western | 9th | Pacific | 5th | 18 | 64 | .220 | 51 | Did not qualify | Sidney Wicks (ROY) | Rolland Todd (12–44) Stu Inman (6–20) | |
| 1972–73 | Western | 9th | Pacific | 5th | 21 | 61 | .256 | 39 | Did not qualify | — | Jack McCloskey | |
| 1973–74 | Western | 9th | Pacific | 5th | 27 | 55 | .329 | 20 | Did not qualify | — | Jack McCloskey | |
| 1974–75 | Western | 6th | Pacific | 3rd | 38 | 44 | .463 | 10 | Did not qualify | — | Lenny Wilkens | |
| 1975–76 | Western | 7th | Pacific | 5th | 37 | 45 | .451 | 22 | Did not qualify | — | Lenny Wilkens | |
| 1976–77 | Western * | 3rd ¤ | Pacific | 2nd | 49 | 33 | .598 | 4 | Won first round vs. Bulls, 2–1; Won conference semifinals vs. Nuggets, 4–2; Won conference finals vs. Lakers, 4–0; Won NBA Finals vs. 76ers, 4–2 † | Bill Walton (FMVP) | Jack Ramsay | |
| 1977–78 | Western | 1st ¤ | Pacific | 1st ^ | 58 | 24 | .707 | — | Lost conference semifinals vs. SuperSonics, 4–2 | Bill Walton (MVP) | Jack Ramsay | |
| 1978–79 | Western | 6th ¤ | Pacific | 4th | 45 | 37 | .549 | 7 | Lost first round vs. Suns, 2–1 | — | Jack Ramsay | |
| 1979–80 | Western | 6th ¤ | Pacific | 4th | 38 | 44 | .463 | 22 | Lost first round vs. SuperSonics, 2–1 | — | Jack Ramsay | |
| 1980–81 | Western | 4th ¤ | Pacific | 3rd | 45 | 37 | .549 | 12 | Lost first round vs. Kings, 2–1 | — | Jack Ramsay | |
| 1981–82 | Western | 8th | Pacific | 5th | 42 | 40 | .512 | 15 | Did not qualify | — | Jack Ramsay | |
| 1982–83 | Western | 5th ¤ | Pacific | 4th | 46 | 36 | .561 | 12 | Won first round vs. SuperSonics, 2–0; Lost conference semifinals vs. Lakers, 4–1 | — | Jack Ramsay | |
| 1983–84 | Western | 3rd ¤ | Pacific | 2nd | 48 | 34 | .585 | 6 | Lost first round vs. Suns, 3–2 | — | Jack Ramsay | |
| 1984–85 | Western | 5th ¤ | Pacific | 2nd | 42 | 40 | .512 | 20 | Won first round vs. Mavericks, 3–1; Lost conference semifinals vs. Lakers, 4–1 | — | Jack Ramsay | |
| 1985–86 | Western | 6th ¤ | Pacific | 2nd | 40 | 42 | .488 | 22 | Lost first round vs. Nuggets, 3–1 | — | Jack Ramsay | |
| 1986–87 | Western | 3rd ¤ | Pacific | 2nd | 49 | 33 | .598 | 16 | Lost first round vs. Rockets, 3–1 | Mike Schuler (COY) | Mike Schuler | |
| 1987–88 | Western | 4th ¤ | Pacific | 2nd | 53 | 29 | .646 | 9 | Lost first round vs. Jazz, 3–1 | Kevin Duckworth (MIP) | Mike Schuler | |
| 1988–89 | Western | 8th ¤ | Pacific | 5th | 39 | 43 | .476 | 18 | Lost first round vs. Lakers, 3–0 | — | Mike Schuler (25–22) Rick Adelman (14–21) | |
| 1989–90 | Western * | 3rd ¤ | Pacific | 2nd | 59 | 23 | .720 | 4 | Won first round vs. Mavericks, 3–0; Won conference semifinals vs. Spurs, 4–3; Won conference finals vs. Suns, 4–2; Lost NBA Finals vs. Pistons, 4–1 * | — | Rick Adelman | |
| 1990–91 | Western | 1st ¤ | Pacific | 1st ^ | 63 | 19 | .768 | — | Won first round vs. SuperSonics, 3–2; Won conference semifinals vs. Jazz, 4–1; Lost conference finals vs. Lakers, 4–2 | Bucky Buckwalter (EOY) | Rick Adelman | |
| 1991–92 | Western * | 1st ¤ | Pacific | 1st ^ | 57 | 25 | .695 | — | Won first round vs. Lakers, 3–1; Won conference semifinals vs. Suns, 4–1; Won conference finals vs. Jazz, 4–2; Lost NBA Finals vs. Bulls, 4–2 * | — | Rick Adelman | |
| 1992–93 | Western | 4th ¤ | Pacific | 3rd | 51 | 31 | .622 | 11 | Lost first round vs. Spurs, 3–1 | Terry Porter (JWKC) Clifford Robinson (SMOY) | Rick Adelman | |
| 1993–94 | Western | 7th ¤ | Pacific | 4th | 47 | 35 | .573 | 16 | Lost first round vs. Rockets, 3–1 | — | Rick Adelman | |
| 1994–95 | Western | 7th ¤ | Pacific | 4th | 44 | 38 | .537 | 15 | Lost first round vs. Suns, 3–0 | — | P. J. Carlesimo | |
| 1995–96 | Western | 6th ¤ | Pacific | 3rd | 44 | 38 | .537 | 20 | Lost first round vs. Jazz, 3–2 | Chris Dudley (JWKC) | P. J. Carlesimo | |
| 1996–97 | Western | 5th ¤ | Pacific | 3rd | 49 | 33 | .598 | 8 | Lost first round vs. Lakers, 3–1 | — | P. J. Carlesimo | |
| 1997–98 | Western | 6th ¤ | Pacific | 4th | 46 | 36 | .561 | 15 | Lost first round vs. Lakers, 3–1 | — | Mike Dunleavy | |
| 1998–99 (Note: Due to a lockout, the season did not start until February 5, 1999, and all 29 teams played a shortened 50 game regular season schedule.) | Western | 2nd ¤ | Pacific | 1st ^ | 35 | 15 | .700 | — | Won first round vs. Suns, 3–0; Won conference semifinals vs. Jazz, 4–2; Lost conference finals vs. Spurs, 4–0 | Mike Dunleavy (COY) Brian Grant (JWKC) | Mike Dunleavy | |
| 1999–2000 | Western | 3rd ¤ | Pacific | 2nd | 59 | 23 | .720 | 8 | Won first round vs. Timberwolves, 3–1; Won conference semifinals vs. Jazz, 4–1; Lost conference finals vs. Lakers, 4–3 | — | Mike Dunleavy | |
| 2000–01 | Western | 7th ¤ | Pacific | 4th | 50 | 32 | .610 | 6 | Lost first round vs. Lakers, 3–0 | — | Mike Dunleavy | |
| 2001–02 | Western | 6th ¤ | Pacific | 3rd | 49 | 33 | .598 | 12 | Lost first round vs. Lakers, 3–0 | — | Maurice Cheeks | |
| 2002–03 | Western | 6th ¤ | Pacific | 3rd | 50 | 32 | .610 | 9 | Lost first round vs. Mavericks, 4–3 | — | Maurice Cheeks | |
| 2003–04 | Western | 10th | Pacific | 3rd | 41 | 41 | .500 | 15 | Did not qualify | Zach Randolph (MIP) | Maurice Cheeks | |
| 2004–05 | Western | 13th | Northwest | 4th | 27 | 55 | .329 | 25 | Did not qualify | — | Maurice Cheeks (22–33) Kevin Pritchard (5–22) | |
| 2005–06 | Western | 15th | Northwest | 5th | 21 | 61 | .256 | 23 | Did not qualify | — | Nate McMillan | |
| 2006–07 | Western | 12th | Northwest | 3rd | 32 | 50 | .390 | 19 | Did not qualify | Brandon Roy (ROY) | Nate McMillan | |
| 2007–08 | Western | 10th | Northwest | 3rd | 41 | 41 | .500 | 13 | Did not qualify | — | Nate McMillan | |
| 2008–09 | Western | 4th ¤ | Northwest | 2nd (Note: The Blazers tied with the Denver Nuggets for first place in the division, but tiebreakers from the season resulted in the Nuggets being declared the division champion for playoff seeding purposes.) | 54 | 28 | .659 | — | Lost first round vs. Rockets, 4–2 | — | Nate McMillan | |
| 2009–10 | Western | 6th ¤ | Northwest | 3rd | 50 | 32 | .610 | 3 | Lost first round vs. Suns, 4–2 | — | Nate McMillan | |
| 2010–11 | Western | 6th ¤ | Northwest | 3rd | 48 | 34 | .585 | 7 | Lost first round vs. Mavericks, 4–2 | — | Nate McMillan | |
| 2011–12 (Note: Due to a lockout, the season did not start until December 25, 2011 and all 30 teams played a shortened 66-game regular season schedule.) | Western | 11th | Northwest | 4th | 28 | 38 | .424 | 19 | Did not qualify | — | Nate McMillan (20–23) Kaleb Canales (8–15) | |
| 2012–13 | Western | 11th | Northwest | 4th | 33 | 49 | .402 | 27 | Did not qualify | Damian Lillard (ROY) | Terry Stotts | |
| 2013–14 | Western | 5th ¤ | Northwest | 2nd | 54 | 28 | .659 | 5 | Won first round vs. Rockets, 4–2; Lost conference semifinals vs. Spurs, 4–1 | — | Terry Stotts | |
| 2014–15 | Western | 4th ¤ | Northwest | 1st ^ | 51 | 31 | .622 | — | Lost first round vs. Grizzlies, 4–1 | — | Terry Stotts | |
| 2015–16 | Western | 5th ¤ | Northwest | 2nd | 44 | 38 | .537 | 11 | Won first round vs. Clippers, 4–2; Lost conference semifinals vs. Warriors, 4–1 | CJ McCollum (MIP) | Terry Stotts | |
| 2016–17 | Western | 8th ¤ | Northwest | 3rd | 41 | 41 | .500 | 10 | Lost first round vs. Warriors, 4–0 | — | Terry Stotts | |
| 2017–18 | Western | 3rd ¤ | Northwest | 1st ^ | 49 | 33 | .598 | — | Lost first round vs. Pelicans, 4–0 | — | Terry Stotts | |
| 2018–19 | Western | 3rd ¤ | Northwest | 2nd | 53 | 29 | .646 | 1 | Won first round vs. Thunder, 4–1; Won conference semifinals vs. Nuggets, 4–3; Lost conference finals vs. Warriors, 4–0 | Damian Lillard (JWKC) | Terry Stotts | |
| 2019–20 (Note: The season was shortened due to the COVID-19 pandemic on March 11 after Rudy Gobert of the Utah Jazz tested positive. The season resumed in July 2020 with the 16 teams who were in playoff position when the season was suspended and the six teams that were six games or fewer behind the eighth seed taking part in the NBA Bubble at Walt Disney World.) | Western | 8th ¤ | Northwest | 4th | 35 | 39 | .473 | 11.5 | Lost first round vs. Lakers, 4–1 | — | Terry Stotts | |
| 2020–21 (Note: The season was shortened to 72 games due to the COVID-19 pandemic.) | Western | 6th ¤ | Northwest | 3rd | 42 | 30 | .583 | 10 | Lost first round vs. Nuggets, 4–2 | — | Terry Stotts | |
| 2021–22 | Western | 13th | Northwest | 4th | 27 | 55 | .329 | 22 | Did not qualify | — | Chauncey Billups | |
| 2022–23 | Western | 13th | Northwest | 5th | 33 | 49 | .402 | 20 | Did not qualify | — | Chauncey Billups | |
| 2023–24 | Western | 15th | Northwest | 5th | 21 | 61 | .256 | 36 | Did not qualify | — | Chauncey Billups | |
| 2024–25 | Western | 12th | Northwest | 4th | 36 | 46 | .439 | 32 | Did not qualify | — | Chauncey Billups | |
| 2025–26 | Western | 7th ¤ (Note: The team moved up from the 8th seed after defeating the Phoenix Suns in the NBA play-in tournament.) | Northwest | 4th | 42 | 40 | .512 | 22 | Lost first round vs. Spurs, 4–1 | — | Chauncey Billups (0–1) (Note: Billups was placed on leave from the team after being arrested by the FBI as part of a federal gambling investigation.) Tiago Splitter (42–39) | |
| All-time regular season record | | | | | 2,370 | 2,156 | .524 | 1970–2026 | | | | |
| All-time postseason record | | | | | 120 | 159 | .430 | Playoff series record: 22–37 | | | | |
| All-time regular & postseason record | | | | | 2,490 | 2,315 | .518 | 1970–2026 | | | | |
1 NBA championship, 3 conference titles, 6 division titles

== See also ==
- History of the Portland Trail Blazers
