= Walt Gilmore =

American basketball player

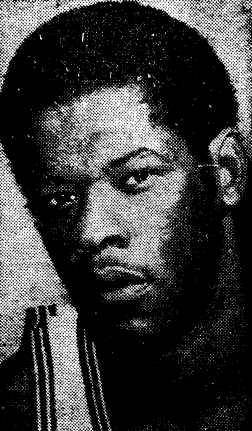

Personal information
- Born: February 27, 1947 (age 79) Millen, Georgia, U.S.
- Listed height: 6 ft 6 in (1.98 m)
- Listed weight: 225 lb (102 kg)

Career information
- College: Fort Valley State (1966–1970)
- NBA draft: 1970: 2nd round, 8th overall pick
- Drafted by: Portland Trail Blazers
- Position: Power forward
- Number: 48

Career history
- 1970–1971: Portland Trail Blazers
- 1971–1972: Cherry Hill Demons
- Stats at NBA.com
- Stats at Basketball Reference

Walt Gilmore (born February 27, 1947) is an American former basketball player in the National Basketball Association (NBA). He was drafted in the second round of the 1970 NBA draft by the Portland Trail Blazers and would play one season with the team.

Portland head coach Rolland Todd said of Gilmore, "Physical strength and speed are his assets. He does lack the background of having had to do a variety of things in college." Gilmore's agent, Leo Zinn, claimed to negotiate a $300,000 salary on behalf of his client. The Trail Blazers placed Gilmore on waivers on September 27, 1971.

Gilmore was signed by the Cherry Hill Demons of the Eastern Basketball Association (EBA) in October 1971.

In 1972, Gilmore signed with the Kansas City Kings, but was waived before the start of the season. In November 1972, he unsuccessfully tried out the Memphis Tams of the American Basketball Association (ABA).

Gilmore was invited to preseason camp by the Philadelphia 76ers in 1973, but was one of the first players cut.

== Career statistics ==
Legend
GP	Games played	GS	Games started	MPG	Minutes per game
FG%	Field goal percentage	3P%	3-point field goal percentage	FT%	Free throw percentage
RPG	Rebounds per game	APG	Assists per game	SPG	Steals per game
BPG	Blocks per game	PPG	Points per game	**Bold**	Career high

=== NBA ===
==== Regular season ====
Year	Team	GP	MPG	FG%	FT%	RPG	APG	PPG
1970–71	Portland	27	9.7	.426	.462	2.7	.4	2.1
