= Charlie Yelverton =

American basketball player (born 1948)

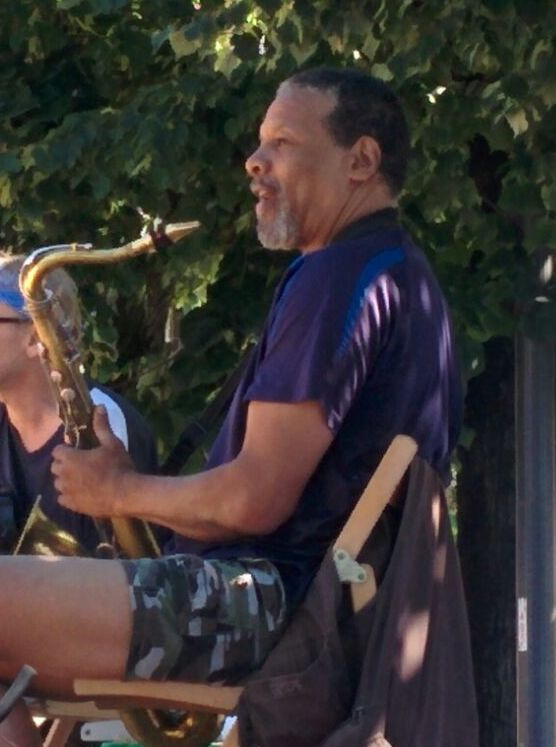
- Yelverton in 2016

Personal information
- Born: December 5, 1948 (age 77) New York City, New York, U.S.
- Listed height: 6 ft 2 in (1.88 m)
- Listed weight: 190 lb (86 kg)

Career information
- High school: Rice (Harlem, New York)
- College: Fordham (1968–1971)
- NBA draft: 1971: 2nd round, 25th overall pick
- Drafted by: Portland Trail Blazers
- Playing career: 1971–1987
- Position: Shooting guard / small forward
- Number: 11

Career history
- 1971–1972: Portland Trail Blazers
- 1972: Scranton Apollos
- 1972–1973: Olympiacos
- 1974–1975: Ignis Varese
- 1975–1976: Brescia
- 1977–1979: Mobilgirgi / Emerson Varese
- 1979–1980: Viganello
- 1980–1987: Robur Basket Saronno

Career highlights
- EuroLeague champion (1975); Third-team All-American – UPI (1971); Haggerty Award winner (1971); No. 34 retired by Fordham Rams
- Stats at NBA.com
- Stats at Basketball Reference

Charlie Yelverton (born December 5, 1948) is an American former professional basketball player. At a height of 1.88 m (6 ft 2 in) tall, he played as shooting guard-small forward. He is a member of the New York State Basketball Hall of Fame.

== College career ==
Yelverton played college basketball at Fordham, with the Fordham Rams, from 1968 to 1971. He won the Haggerty Award in 1971, and was also an UPI All-American Third Team selection in (1971). Fordham retired Yelverton's jersey number 34 in 2023.

== Professional career ==
Yelverton was drafted 25th overall by the Portland Trail Blazers, in the 1971 NBA draft, but only appeared in one NBA season.

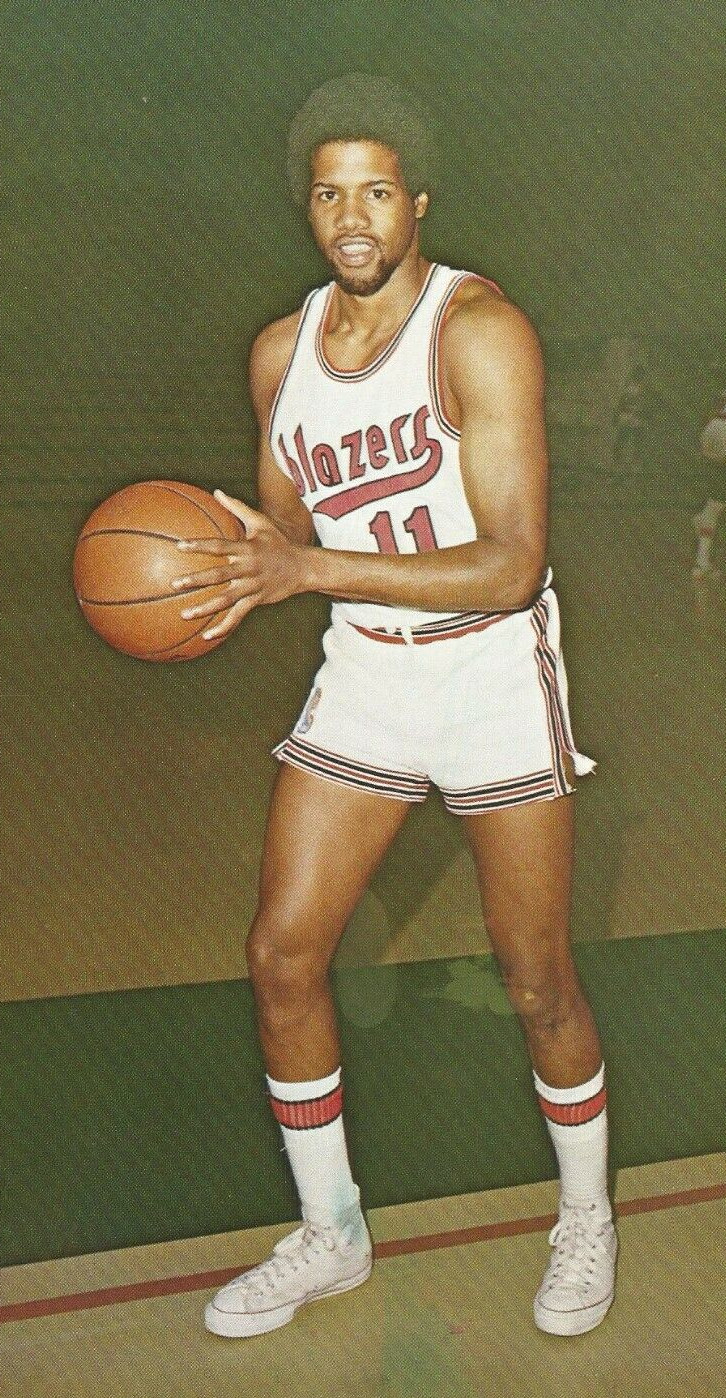
Yelverton, 1971

During a game on February 1, 1972, Yelverton did not participate in pre-game warmups and sat on the bench during the singing on the US national anthem. The Oregonian reported his actions were in protest of Portland's release of Willie McCarter. Blazers forward Sidney Wicks was accused of playing lackadaisical defense during the game as his protest. Yelverton told the New York Post in 2016 his protest was in response to the Vietnam War and capitalism. Portland head coach Rolland Todd was fired the next day for failing to handle the situation and Yelverton went on to play 24 more games for the Blazers. He was waived in September 1972, shortly before the Blazers were scheduled to travel to Hawaii for a pre-season tournament between NBA and ABA teams.

In the summer of 1973, Yelverton was invited the training camp of the ABA Carolina Cougars at Elon University in Elon, North Carolina. He was not offered a contract at the conclusion of the camp.

Yelverton then headed to Europe, where he played with Olympiacos in Greece, and Ignis Varese in Italy. He helped Ignis Varèse to win the 1975 EuroLeague title, and he also played with the same team in two other EuroLeague Finals, in 1978 and 1979. He also won the 1978 Italian League title, while in Varèse.

On February 3, 2008, Yelverton was among the 105 player nominees for the 50 Greatest EuroLeague Contributors list, which commemorated the fiftieth anniversary of the EuroLeague competition.

== Career statistics ==
Legend
GP	Games played	GS	Games started	MPG	Minutes per game
FG%	Field goal percentage	3P%	3-point field goal percentage	FT%	Free throw percentage
RPG	Rebounds per game	APG	Assists per game	SPG	Steals per game
BPG	Blocks per game	PPG	Points per game	**Bold**	Career high

=== NBA ===
==== Regular season ====
Year	Team	GP	MPG	FG%	FT%	RPG	APG	PPG
1971–72	Portland	69	17.8	.389	.707	2.9	1.2	7.9
