= Claude English =

American basketball player and coach

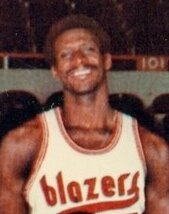
- English with the Portland Trail Blazers in 1970

Personal information
- Born: December 26, 1946 (age 79) Columbus, Georgia, U.S.
- Listed height: 6 ft 4 in (1.93 m)
- Listed weight: 185 lb (84 kg)

Career information
- High school: South Girard (Phenix City, Alabama)
- College: Rhode Island (1968–1970)
- NBA draft: 1970: 7th round, 110th overall pick
- Drafted by: Portland Trail Blazers
- Playing career: 1970–1975
- Position: Small forward
- Number: 15
- Coaching career: 1971–1984

Career history

Playing
- 1970–1971: Portland Trail Blazers
- 1971–1974: Hartford Capitols
- 1974–1975: Cherry Hill Pros

Coaching
- 1971–1980: Rhode Island (assistant)
- 1980–1984: Rhode Island
- 1992–2005: Park

Career highlights
- As player: EBA champion (1974); As head coach: Atlantic 10 co-Coach of the Year (1981); 2× American Midwest Conference Coach of the Year (1996, 1998)
- Stats at NBA.com
- Stats at Basketball Reference

Claude W. English (born December 26, 1946) is an American former professional basketball player and collegiate coach. He spent one season in the National Basketball Association (NBA) with the Portland Trail Blazers during their inaugural 1970–71 season. He was drafted by the Blazers in the seventh round (110^{th} pick overall) during the 1970 NBA draft from the University of Rhode Island.

English played in the Eastern Basketball Association (EBA) for the Hartford Capitols and Cherry Hill Pros from 1971 to 1975. He won an EBA championship with the Capitols in 1974.

== Coaching/Athletic Director Career ==
English returned to the University of Rhode Island, where he began a tenure as an assistant basketball coach shortly after his NBA career ended. English then served as the head coach at Rhode Island from 1980 to 1984.

Since 1996, English has served as the athletic director at Park University in Parkville, Missouri. English served as head men's basketball coach at Park University from 1992 through 2005, being named the American Midwest Conference Coach of the Year in 1996 and in 1998. In 2010, English was inducted into the McLendon Minority Athletics Administrators Hall of Fame in Anaheim, California. In 2011, English was inducted into the Chattahoochee Valley Sports Hall of Fame, in his hometown of Phenix City, Alabama. In 2017, English was named the American Midwest Conference Athletic Director of the Year.

Of his athletic director career, English said "I’m just a coach who coaches the coaches. That’s the way I always see my job. I want to motivate other people the way I’m motivated."

== Career statistics ==
Legend
GP	Games played	GS	Games started	MPG	Minutes per game
FG%	Field goal percentage	3P%	3-point field goal percentage	FT%	Free throw percentage
RPG	Rebounds per game	APG	Assists per game	SPG	Steals per game
BPG	Blocks per game	PPG	Points per game	**Bold**	Career high

=== NBA ===
==== Regular season ====
Year	Team	GP	MPG	FG%	FT%	RPG	APG	PPG
1970–71	Portland	18	3.9	.262	.714	1.1	.3	1.5
