= Jim Marsh (basketball) =

American basketball player (1946–2019)

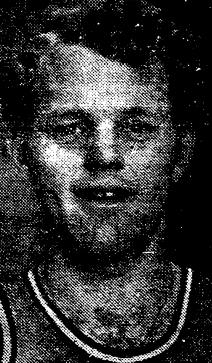

Personal information
- Born: April 26, 1946
- Died: August 12, 2019 (aged 73) Multnomah County, Oregon, U.S.
- Listed height: 6 ft 7 in (2.01 m)
- Listed weight: 215 lb (98 kg)

Career information
- High school: Pasadena (Pasadena, California)
- College: USC (1965–1968)
- NBA draft: 1968: 11th round, 136th overall pick
- Drafted by: Seattle SuperSonics
- Playing career: 1971–1972
- Position: Small forward
- Number: 51

Career history
- 1971–1972: Portland Trail Blazers

Career statistics
- Points: 119 (3.1 ppg)
- Rebounds: 84 (2.2 rpg)
- Assists: 30 (0.8 apg)
- Stats at NBA.com
- Stats at Basketball Reference

James Marsh (April 26, 1946 – August 12, 2019) was an American professional basketball player who competed in the National Basketball Association (NBA) for one season. He played college basketball for the USC Trojans, and played professionally for the Portland Trail Blazers of the NBA.

After his playing career, Marsh spent time as an assistant coach at the University of Utah before transitioning to a career as a broadcaster for the Seattle SuperSonics, which is the franchise by which he was drafted out of college. He served as the color commentator on SuperSonics television broadcasts for 12 years.

Marsh was diagnosed with Parkinson's disease in 2004. He had two adult daughters and lived in Kirkland, Washington, where he continued to coach an AAU basketball team. Marsh died on August 12, 2019.

== Career statistics ==
Legend
GP	Games played	GS	Games started	MPG	Minutes per game
FG%	Field goal percentage	3P%	3-point field goal percentage	FT%	Free throw percentage
RPG	Rebounds per game	APG	Assists per game	SPG	Steals per game
BPG	Blocks per game	PPG	Points per game	**Bold**	Career high

=== NBA ===
==== Regular season ====
Year	Team	GP	MPG	FG%	FT%	RPG	APG	PPG
1971–72	Portland	39	9.6	.333	.695	2.2	.8	3.1
