= Ron Knight (basketball) =

American basketball player

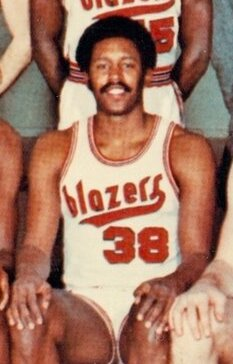
- Knight with the Portland Trail Blazers in 1970

Personal information
- Born: August 4, 1947 (age 79)
- Listed height: 6 ft 7 in (2.01 m)
- Listed weight: 215 lb (98 kg)

Career information
- High school: Compton (Compton, California)
- College: Cal State Los Angeles (1967–1970)
- NBA draft: 1970: 5th round, 76th overall pick
- Drafted by: Portland Trail Blazers
- Position: Power forward / small forward
- Number: 38

Career history
- 1970–1972: Portland Trail Blazers

Career highlights
- Second-team All-PCAA (1970)
- Stats at NBA.com
- Stats at Basketball Reference

Ronald Eugene Knight (born August 4, 1947) is a retired American professional basketball forward who spent two seasons in the National Basketball Association both with the Portland Trail Blazers. He was a member of the inaugural 1970–71 Blazers team after being drafted in the fifth round (76th pick overall) during the 1970 NBA draft. Knight played college basketball for the Cal State Los Angeles Golden Eagles and was a second-team All-Pacific Coast Athletic Association selection in 1970.

== Career statistics ==
Legend
GP	Games played	GS	Games started	MPG	Minutes per game
FG%	Field goal percentage	3P%	3-point field goal percentage	FT%	Free throw percentage
RPG	Rebounds per game	APG	Assists per game	SPG	Steals per game
BPG	Blocks per game	PPG	Points per game	**Bold**	Career high

=== NBA ===
==== Regular season ====
Year	Team	GP	MPG	FG%	FT%	RPG	APG	PPG
1970–71	Portland	**52**	**12.7**	.430	**.500**	**3.2**	**1.0**	4.2
1971–72	Portland	49	9.9	**.436**	**.500**	2.4	.7	**5.2**
Career		101	11.3	.433	.500	2.8	.8	4.7
