= Gary Gregor =

American basketball player (born 1945)

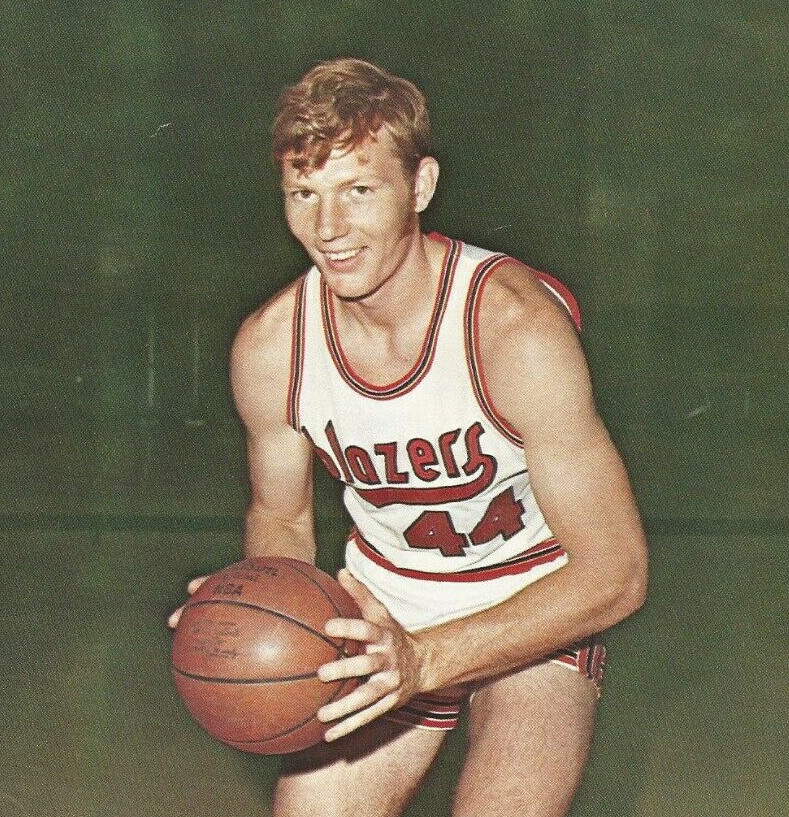
- Gregor, circa 1971

Personal information
- Born: August 13, 1945 (age 81) Charleston, West Virginia, U.S.
- Listed height: 6 ft 7 in (2.01 m)
- Listed weight: 225 lb (102 kg)

Career information
- High school: South Charleston (South Charleston, West Virginia)
- College: South Carolina (1965–1968)
- NBA draft: 1968: 1st round, 8th overall pick
- Drafted by: Phoenix Suns
- Playing career: 1968–1974
- Position: Power forward / center
- Number: 44, 40, 9

Career history
- 1968–1969: Phoenix Suns
- 1969–1970: Atlanta Hawks
- 1970–1972: Portland Trail Blazers
- 1972: Milwaukee Bucks
- 1972–1974: New York Nets

Career highlights
- NBA All-Rookie First Team (1969); 2× Second-team All-ACC (1967, 1968)

Career NBA and ABA statistics
- Points: 3,227 (8.9 ppg)
- Rebounds: 2,286 (6.3 rpg)
- Assists: 482 (1.3 apg)
- Stats at NBA.com
- Stats at Basketball Reference

Gary W. Gregor (born August 13, 1945) is an American former professional basketball player.

A 6 ft 7 in (2.01 m) forward/center from the University of South Carolina, Gregor played in the National Basketball Association and American Basketball Association as a member of the Phoenix Suns (1968–1969), Atlanta Hawks (1969–1970), Portland Trail Blazers (1970–1972), Milwaukee Bucks (1972–1973), and New York Nets (1973–1974). He earned NBA All-Rookie Team honors in 1969 after averaging 11.1 points per game and 8.9 rebounds per game for the Suns.

== Career statistics ==
Legend
| GP | Games played | GS | Games started | MPG | Minutes per game |
| FG% | Field goal percentage | 3P% | 3-point field goal percentage | FT% | Free throw percentage |
| RPG | Rebounds per game | APG | Assists per game | SPG | Steals per game |
| BPG | Blocks per game | PPG | Points per game | **Bold** | Career high |

=== NBA ===
==== Regular season ====
| Year | Team | GP | GS | MPG | FG% | 3P% | FT% | RPG | APG | SPG | BPG | PPG |
|---|---|---|---|---|---|---|---|---|---|---|---|---|
| 1968–69 | Phoenix | 80 | - | 27.3 | .415 | - | .649 | **8.9** | 1.2 | - | - | **11.1** |
| 1969–70 | Atlanta | 81 | - | 19.8 | .433 | - | **.779** | 4.9 | 0.8 | - | - | 8.1 |
| 1970–71 | Portland | 44 | - | 26.2 | .430 | - | .663 | 7.6 | 1.8 | - | - | 9.6 |
| 1971–72 | Portland | **82** | - | **28.9** | **.451** | - | .755 | 7.2 | **2.3** | - | - | **11.1** |
| 1972–73 | Milwaukee | 9 | - | 9.8 | .333 | - | .714 | 3.6 | 1.0 | - | - | 3.0 |
| Career | | 296 | - | 25.0 | .431 | - | .715 | 7.0 | 1.5 | - | - | 9.8 |

==== Playoffs ====
| Year | Team | GP | GS | MPG | FG% | 3P% | FT% | RPG | APG | SPG | BPG | PPG |
|---|---|---|---|---|---|---|---|---|---|---|---|---|
| 1969–70 | Atlanta | **7** | - | **9.6** | **.286** | - | **.667** | **2.4** | **0.3** | - | - | **2.3** |
| Career | | 7 | - | 9.6 | .286 | - | .667 | 2.4 | 0.3 | - | - | 2.3 |

=== ABA ===
==== Regular season ====
| Year | Team | GP | GS | MPG | FG% | 3P% | FT% | RPG | APG | SPG | BPG | PPG |
|---|---|---|---|---|---|---|---|---|---|---|---|---|
| 1972–73 | New York | **40** | - | **14.9** | **.485** | **1.000** | **.821** | **3.8** | **0.8** | - | - | **5.8** |
| 1973–74 | New York | 25 | - | 12.5 | .471 | .667 | .818 | 2.8 | 0.6 | **0.2** | 0.0 | 3.6 |
| Career | | 65 | - | 14.0 | .481 | .750 | .820 | 3.4 | 0.7 | 0.2 | 0.0 | 5.0 |

==== Playoffs ====
| Year | Team | GP | GS | MPG | FG% | 3P% | FT% | RPG | APG | SPG | BPG | PPG |
|---|---|---|---|---|---|---|---|---|---|---|---|---|
| 1972–73 | New York | **1** | - | **12.0** | **.167** | .000 | **1.000** | **4.0** | 0.0 | - | - | **4.0** |
| Career | | 1 | - | 12.0 | .167 | .000 | 1.000 | 4.0 | 0.0 | - | - | 4.0 |
