= Stan McKenzie (basketball) =

American basketball player (1944–2021)

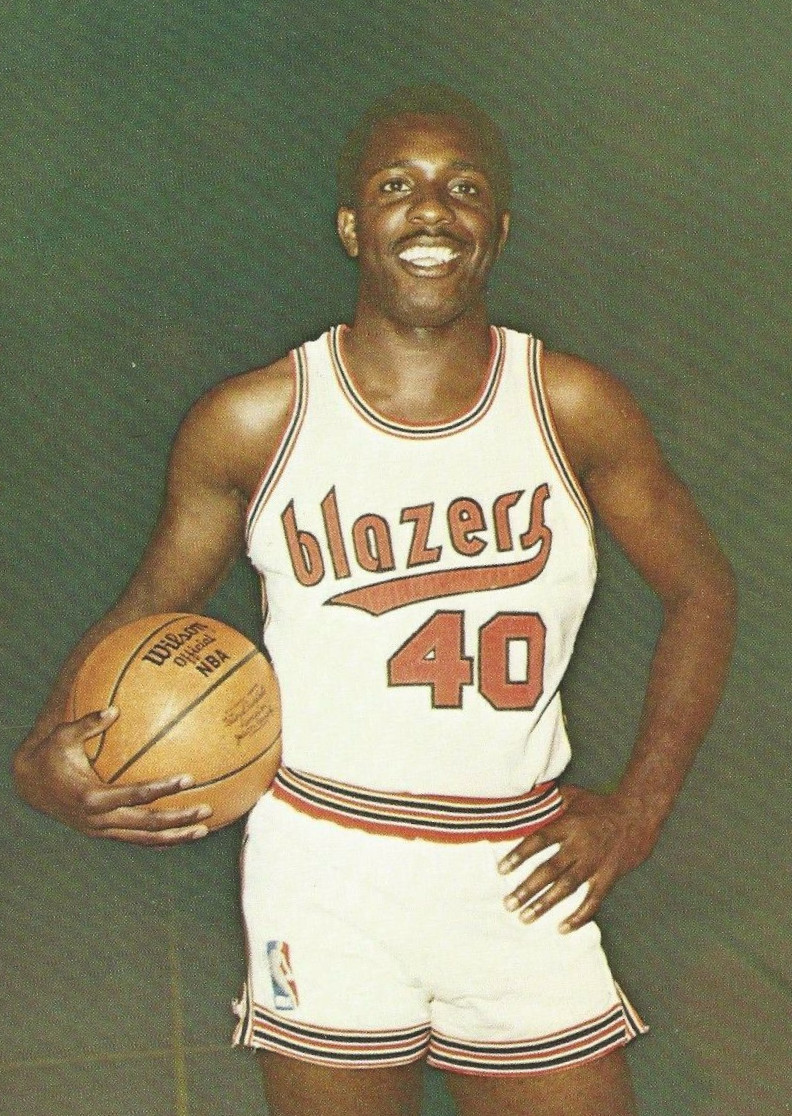
- McKenzie, circa 1971

Personal information
- Born: October 6, 1944 Miami, Florida, U.S.
- Died: July 21, 2021 (aged 76)
- Listed height: 6 ft 5 in (1.96 m)
- Listed weight: 195 lb (88 kg)

Career information
- High school: Miami Northwestern (Miami, Florida)
- College: NYU (1963–1966)
- NBA draft: 1966: 11th round, 94th overall pick
- Drafted by: Baltimore Bullets
- Playing career: 1966–1973
- Position: Small forward / shooting guard
- Number: 40

Career history
- 1966–1967: Ignis Varese
- 1967–1968: Baltimore Bullets
- 1968–1970: Phoenix Suns
- 1970–1972: Portland Trail Blazers
- 1972–1973: Houston Rockets

Career NBA statistics
- Points: 3,579 (9.0 ppg)
- Rebounds: 1,117 (2.8 rpg)
- Assists: 611 (1.5 apg)
- Stats at NBA.com
- Stats at Basketball Reference

Stanley McKenzie (October 6, 1944 – July 21, 2021) was an American professional basketball player in the National Basketball Association (NBA). Born in Miami, Florida, McKenzie played college basketball for the NYU Violets. He scored over 1,000 points in his collegiate career, and was inducted into the NYU Hall of Fame in 1984.

He was selected by the Baltimore Bullets in the 11th round of the 1966 NBA draft. He played one season with the Bullets, then played for the Phoenix Suns for two years (1968–1970). He next played for the Portland Trail Blazers (1970–1972). He was traded from the Trail Blazers to the Houston Rockets for Greg Smith on October 27, 1972. He retired from the NBA in 1973.

He was married to Vashti Murphy McKenzie, who became the first woman Bishop in the African Methodist Episcopal Church. Stan McKenzie was also a leader in the AME church, and served as the first male Supervisor of Missions in the AME Church's more than 200-year history. He served as head of missions for three districts, including the 18th, 13th and 10th Episcopal Districts.

== Career statistics ==
Legend
GP	Games played	GS	Games started	MPG	Minutes per game
FG%	Field goal percentage	3P%	3-point field goal percentage	FT%	Free throw percentage
RPG	Rebounds per game	APG	Assists per game	SPG	Steals per game
BPG	Blocks per game	PPG	Points per game	**Bold**	Career high

=== NBA ===
==== Regular season ====
Year	Team	GP	MPG	FG%	FT%	RPG	APG	SPG	BPG	PPG
1967–68	Baltimore	50	13.1	.401	.659	2.4	.5			4.1
1968–69	Phoenix	80	19.6	.427	.763	3.1	1.5			9.3
1969–70	Phoenix	58	9.1	.393	.795	1.6	.9			3.8
1970–71	Portland	**82**	**27.9**	.441	.836	**3.8**	**2.9**			13.7
1971–72	Portland	**82**	24.8	**.492**	.831	3.3	1.8			**13.8**
1972–73	Portland	7	15.3	.361	**.875**	3.0	1.1			5.7
1972–73	Houston	26	7.2	.422	.762	1.3	.6			3.3
1973–74	Houston	11	10.2	.292	.750	1.5	.5	.3	.0	1.8
Career		396	18.9	.444	.802	2.8	1.5	.3	.0	9.0

==== Playoffs ====
Year	Team	GP	MPG	FG%	FT%	RPG	APG	PPG
1970	Phoenix	7	10.1	.276	.800	1.3	.4	2.9
