= Dale Schlueter =

American basketball player

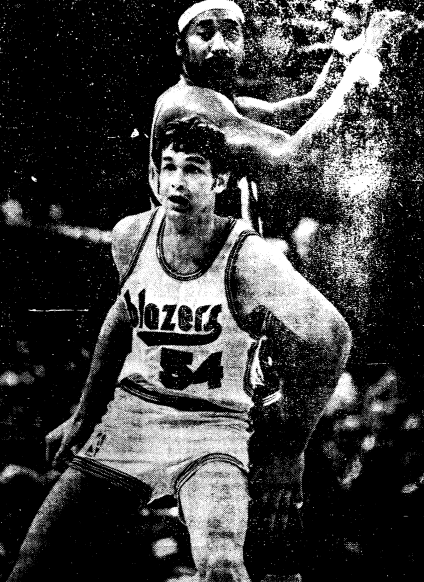

Personal information
- Born: November 12, 1945 Tacoma, Washington, U.S.
- Died: July 24, 2014 (aged 68) Portland, Oregon, U.S.
- Listed height: 6 ft 10 in (2.08 m)
- Listed weight: 225 lb (102 kg)

Career information
- High school: George Washington (Denver, Colorado)
- College: Colorado State (1964–1967)
- NBA draft: 1967: 6th round, 63rd overall pick
- Drafted by: San Francisco Warriors
- Playing career: 1968–1978
- Position: Center
- Number: 54

Career history
- 1968–1970: San Francisco Warriors
- 1970–1972: Portland Trail Blazers
- 1972–1973: Philadelphia 76ers
- 1973–1974: Atlanta Hawks
- 1974–1976: Buffalo Braves
- 1976–1977: Phoenix Suns
- 1977–1978: Portland Trail Blazers

Career NBA statistics
- Points: 3,130 (5.3 ppg)
- Rebounds: 3,034 (5.2 rpg)
- Assists: 920 (1.6 apg)
- Stats at NBA.com
- Stats at Basketball Reference

Dale Wayne Schlueter (November 12, 1945 – July 24, 2014) was an American professional basketball player born in Tacoma, Washington.

A 6'10" center from Colorado State University, Schlueter was selected by the San Francisco Warriors in the sixth round of the 1967 NBA draft and by the Houston Mavericks in the 1967 ABA Draft.

Schlueter played in the National Basketball Association from 1968 to 1978 as a member of the San Francisco Warriors, Portland Trail Blazers, Philadelphia 76ers, Atlanta Hawks, Buffalo Braves, and Phoenix Suns. He was one of the Trail Blazers' original players, as he had been selected from the Warriors in the 1970 NBA expansion draft. He was traded from the Trail Blazers to the 76ers for Dave Wohl on October 2, 1972. He averaged 5.3 points and 5.2 rebounds over his career. He died of cancer on July 24, 2014.

== Career statistics ==
Legend
GP	Games played	GS	Games started	MPG	Minutes per game
FG%	Field goal percentage	3P%	3-point field goal percentage	FT%	Free throw percentage
RPG	Rebounds per game	APG	Assists per game	SPG	Steals per game
BPG	Blocks per game	PPG	Points per game	**Bold**	Career high

=== NBA ===
==== Regular season ====
Year	Team	GP	GS	MPG	FG%	FT%	RPG	APG	SPG	BPG	PPG
1968–69	San Francisco	31		18.0	.433	.549	7.0	1.0			5.8
1969–70	San Francisco	63		10.9	.491	.619	3.7	.4			3.6
1970–71	Portland	80		22.8	.488	.656	7.9	2.4			8.2
1971–72	Portland	**81**		**33.2**	**.525**	.739	**10.6**	**3.5**			**11.7**
1972–73	Philadelphia	78	10	14.6	.524	.699	4.5	1.3			5.4
1973–74	Atlanta	57		9.6	.467	**.760**	2.7	.8	**.4**	.4	2.9
1974–75	Buffalo	76		12.7	.517	.694	3.5	1.4	.2	**.6**	3.5
1975–76	Buffalo	71		10.9	.500	.667	3.2	1.1	.2	.2	2.5
1976–77	Phoenix	39		8.6	.361	.581	2.1	1.0	.2	.2	1.8
1977–78	Portland	10		10.9	.421	.500	2.1	1.8	.3	.2	2.5
Career		586	10	16.4	.497	.678	5.2	1.6	.3	.4	5.3

==== Playoffs ====
Year	Team	GP	MPG	FG%	FT%	RPG	APG	SPG	BPG	PPG
1969	San Francisco	3	**8.3**	.333	.467	**7.3**	**.3**			**4.3**
1975	Buffalo	6	6.7	.600	.333	2.2	.2	**.2**	.0	2.2
1976	Buffalo	**8**	5.5	**.714**	**.833**	1.0	**.3**	.1	**.4**	1.9
Career		17	6.4	.538	.542	2.5	.2	.1	.2	2.4
