= Stu Inman =

American coach in the National Basketball Association

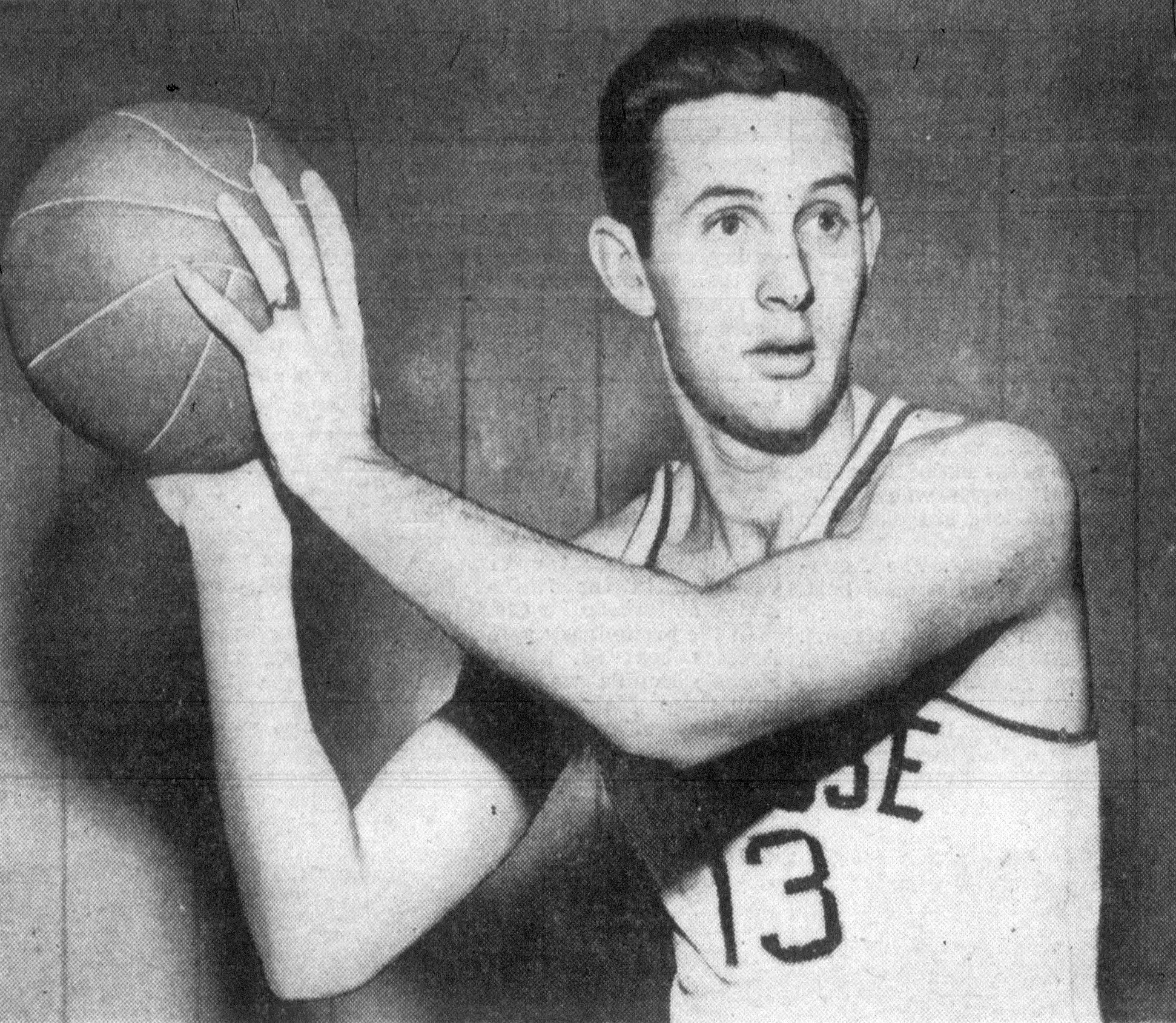
- Inman, circa 1949

Biographical details
- Born: August 2, 1926; Alameda, California, U.S.
- Died: January 30, 2007 (aged 80); Tualatin, Oregon, U.S.

Playing career
- 1947–1950: San Jose State
- Position: Forward

Coaching career (HC unless noted)
- 1950–1951: Madera HS
- 1951–1953: Roosevelt HS
- 1953–1955: Santa Ana CC
- 1955–1957: Orange Coast JC
- 1957–1960: San Jose State (asst.)
- 1960–1966: San Jose State
- 1972: Portland Trail Blazers (interim)

Head coaching record
- Overall: 77–68 (college); 6–20 (NBA)

Stuart Kirk Inman (August 2, 1926 – January 30, 2007) was an American basketball player, coach and executive. He was selected in the sixth round of the 1950 NBA draft from San Jose State University by the Chicago Stags; however, he did not play in the NBA.

== Early life and education ==
Inman played college basketball at San Jose State from 1947 to 1950. As a senior, he averaged 14.9 points.

== Coaching career ==
After graduating from San Jose State, Inman became head coach at Madera High School in Madera, California for a season, then was head coach at Theodore Roosevelt High School in Fresno from 1951 to 1953. He then moved up to the junior college level as head coach at Santa Ana City College from 1953 to 1955, then at Orange Coast Junior College from 1955 to 1957. From 1957 to 1960, Inman was an assistant coach at San Jose State before serving as head coach from 1960 to 1966.

== Executive career ==
In 1970, Inman was one of several people who started the expansion Portland Trail Blazers NBA franchise, and initially served as chief scout. He also served as interim coach at the end of the 1971–72 season, after Rolland Todd was fired midway through the season. Inman played a significant role in the building of Portland Trail Blazers' 1976–77 NBA championship team, acquiring Bill Walton, Geoff Petrie, Larry Steele, Lloyd Neal, Lionel Hollins, Bobby Gross, Wally Walker and Johnny Davis through the draft, signed Dave Twardzik after the American Basketball Association folded, and selected Maurice Lucas in the ABA dispersal draft. Inman later served as the team's general manager from 1981 through 1986.

As the general manager for the Trail Blazers, Inman selected the oft-injured Kentucky center Sam Bowie with the number-two pick in the 1984 NBA draft, one spot ahead of the Chicago Bulls who selected Michael Jordan. At the time Portland already had shooting guards (Clyde Drexler and Jim Paxson) and were in need of a center. Inman reflected on the move in 1992, telling The Palm Beach Post, "There's really no excuse. [...] I knew Michael Jordan; I spent that summer with Bobby Knight and that Olympic team and I can't say I saw that greatness that would manifest itself."

Inman worked for the Milwaukee Bucks as their director of player personnel from 1986 to 1987. He was the director of player personnel for the Miami Heat from the team's inception in 1987 to 1992. He served as a consultant to Dallas Mavericks head coach Quinn Buckner during the 1993–94 season. He later served as an assistant coach at Lake Oswego High School.

He died at age 80 in Lake Oswego, Oregon of a heart attack.

== Head coaching record ==
=== College ===
Record table
Season	Team	Overall	Conference	Standing	Postseason
San Jose State Spartans (West Coast Conference) (1960–1966)
1960–61	San Jose State	11–14	5–7	5th	
1961–62	San Jose State	13–11	0–12	7th	
1962–63	San Jose State	14–10	6–6	T–4th	
1963–64	San Jose State	14–10	6–6	T–3rd	
1964–65	San Jose State	14–10	9–5	T–2nd	
1965–66	San Jose State	11–13	7–7	T–4th	
San Jose State:		77–68	33–43		
Total:		77–68			

=== NBA ===
Legend
Regular season	G	Games coached	W	Games won	L	Games lost	W–L %	Win–loss %
Playoffs	PG	Playoff games	PW	Playoff wins	PL	Playoff losses	PW–L %	Playoff win–loss %

Team	Year	G	W	L	W–L%	Finish	PG	PW	PL	PW–L%	Result
Portland	1972	26	6	20	.231	5th in Pacific	–	–	–	–	–
Career		26	6	20	.231		–	–	–	–	–

== Additional sources ==
- Brian Meehan (December 14, 2006). "Blazers' Inman rubbed elbows with greatest". The Oregonian. Archived from the original on January 4, 2007.
- Mike Tokito (January 31, 2007). "Inman, builder of NBA title team, dies". The Oregonian. Archived from the original on February 4, 2007.
