= 1970–71 Portland Trail Blazers season =

NBA professional basketball team season (1st season)

- Head coach: Rolland Todd
- General manager: Harry Glickman
- Owners: Herman Sarkowsky; Robert Schmertz; Larry Weinberg
- Arena: Memorial Coliseum

Results
- Record: 29–53 (.354)
- Place: Division: 5th (Pacific); Conference: 9th (Western)
- Playoff finish: Did not qualify
- Stats at Basketball Reference

Local media
- Television: KPTV
- Radio: KOIN

The 1970–71 Portland Trail Blazers season was the inaugural season of the Portland Trail Blazers in the National Basketball Association (NBA). In their first regular season game on October 16, 1970, they beat the fellow expansion Cleveland Cavaliers 115–112, with 4,273 people in attendance.

The Trail Blazers played a regular season home game at McArthur Court in Eugene, Oregon on February 19, 1971, against the Cincinnati Royals. Portland was defeated by Cincinnati, 102–109.

Portland finished last in the Pacific Division with a record of 29–53 (.354). Of the three expansion teams, their record was the best; with seven more wins than the Buffalo Braves and fourteen more than the Cavaliers. The leading scorer for the Blazers was Geoff Petrie; he averaged 24.8 points per game and shared Rookie of the Year honors with Boston Celtics star Dave Cowens.

== Offseason ==
=== NBA draft ===
Round	Pick	Player	Position	Nationality	College	Source
1	8	Geoff Petrie	SG	United States	Princeton	
2	25	Walt Gilmore	PF	United States	Fort Valley State	
3	42	Bill Cain	F		Iowa State	
4	59	Jim Penix	F	United States	Bowling Green	
5	76	Ron Knight	PF	United States	Cal State LA	
6	93	George Janky	C	United States	Dayton	
7	110	Claude English	F	United States	Rhode Island	
8	127	Doug Boyd	F/C	United States	TCU	
9	144	Billy Gaskins	G	United States	Oregon	
10	161	Israel Oliver	F	United States	Elizabeth City State	
11	176	Don McClemore	F	United States	Bowling Green	
12	188	Paul Adams	F	United States	Central Washington	
13	199	Alex Boyd	F	United States	Nevada-Reno	
14	208	Frank Loteridge			Texas–Pan American	
15	218	John Canady			Miami (FL)	
16	226	Doug Williams			St. Mary's (TX)	
18	235	Bruce Butchko	F	United States	Southern Illinois	
19	239	Mark Gabriel			Hanover	

=== Expansion draft ===
Player	Position	Team
Rick Adelman	PG	San Diego Rockets
Jerry Chambers	SF	Phoenix Suns
LeRoy Ellis	C	Baltimore Bullets
Fred Hetzel	SF	Philadelphia 76ers
Joe Kennedy	SF	Seattle SuperSonics
Ed Manning	SF/PF	Chicago Bulls
Stan McKenzie	SF	Phoenix Suns
Dorie Murrey	PF	Seattle SuperSonics
Pat Riley	SG	San Diego Rockets
Dale Schlueter	C	San Francisco Warriors
Larry Siegfried	PG	Boston Celtics

== Roster ==
1970–71 Portland Trail Blazers roster
Players

Pos.	No.	Player	Height	Weight	DOB	From
PG	12	Rick Adelman	6 ft 1 in (1.85 m)	175 lb (79 kg)	1946–06–16	Loyola Marymount
SG	33	Jim Barnett	6 ft 4 in (1.93 m)	170 lb (77 kg)	1944–07–07	Oregon
C	25	Leroy Ellis	6 ft 10 in (2.08 m)	210 lb (95 kg)	1940–03–10	St. John's
F	15	Claude English	6 ft 4 in (1.93 m)	185 lb (84 kg)	1946–12–26	Rhode Island
PF	48	Walt Gilmore	6 ft 6 in (1.98 m)	225 lb (102 kg)	1947–02–27	Fort Valley State
PF	44	Gary Gregor	6 ft 7 in (2.01 m)	225 lb (102 kg)	1945–08–13	South Carolina
SF	11	Shaler Halimon	6 ft 5 in (1.96 m)	199 lb (90 kg)	1945–03–30	Utah State
PF	38	Ron Knight	6 ft 7 in (2.01 m)	215 lb (98 kg)	1947–08–04	Cal State LA
PF	35	Ed Manning	6 ft 7 in (2.01 m)	210 lb (95 kg)	1944–01–02	Jackson State
SF	40	Stan McKenzie	6 ft 5 in (1.96 m)	195 lb (88 kg)	1944–10–06	NYU
SG	45	Geoff Petrie	6 ft 4 in (1.93 m)	190 lb (86 kg)	1948–04–17	Princeton
C	54	Dale Schlueter	6 ft 10 in (2.08 m)	225 lb (102 kg)	1945–11–12	Colorado State

Coaches
Head coach
- Rolland Todd

Legend
- (DP) Unsigned draft pick
- (FA) Free agent
- (S) Suspended
- Injured

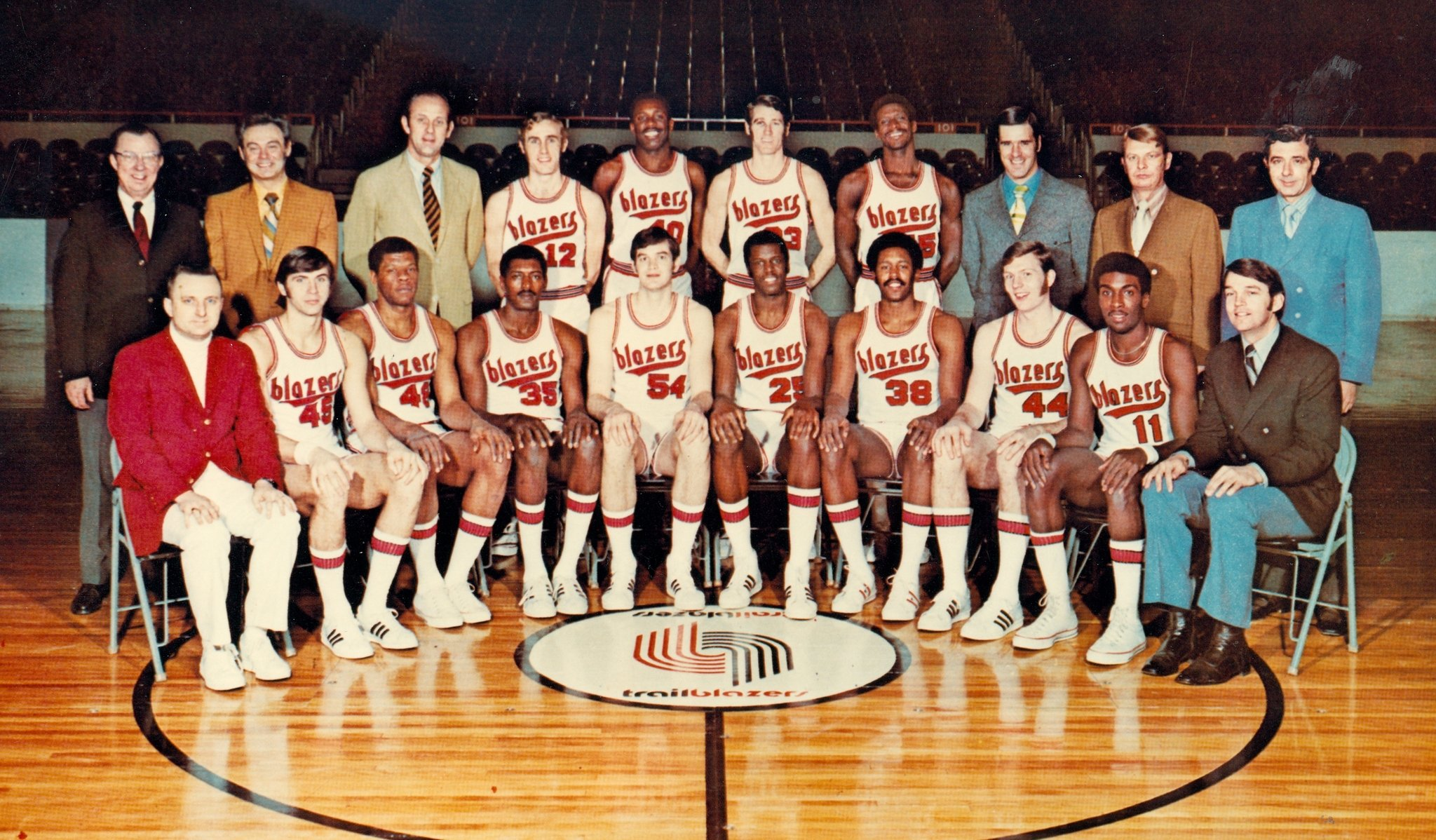
The inaugural Portland Trail Blazers

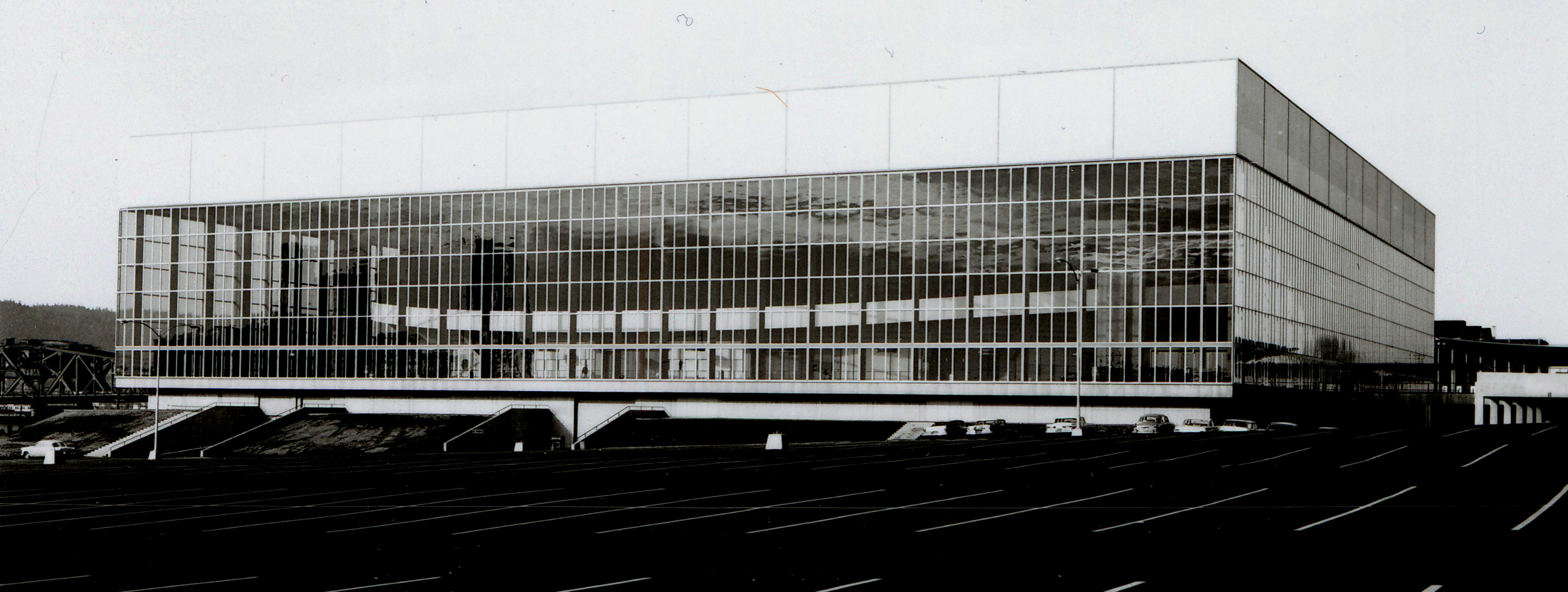
Home games were at Veterans Memorial Coliseum

== Pre-season ==
The Trail Blazers convened their preseason camp on September 14, 1970. Sixteen players reported to camp, which was held in the gymnasium at Pacific University in Forest Grove, Oregon. Pat Riley was unable to attend the camp due to the death in his father. Players reported to drills at 10 am and 4 pm. The first players to be cut from camp were third-round draft pick Bill Cain and Tim Robinson, who had played for the Harlem Globetrotters from 1961 to 1965.

== Regular season ==
=== Season standings ===
Pacific Division	W	L	PCT	GB	Home	Road	Neutral	Div
y-Los Angeles Lakers	48	34	.585	–	30–11	17–22	1–1	15–7
x-San Francisco Warriors	41	41	.500	7	20–18	19–21	2–2	12–10
San Diego Rockets	40	42	.488	8	24–15	15–26	1–1	14–8
Seattle SuperSonics	38	44	.463	10	27–13	11–30	0–1	10–14
Portland Trail Blazers	29	53	.354	19	18–21	9–26	2–6	3–15

#	Western Conference			
#	Team	W	L	PCT
1	z-Milwaukee Bucks	66	16	.805
2	y-Los Angeles Lakers	48	34	.585
3	x-Chicago Bulls	51	31	.622
4	x-San Francisco Warriors	41	41	.500
5	Phoenix Suns	48	34	.585
6	Detroit Pistons	45	37	.549
7	San Diego Rockets	40	42	.488
8	Seattle SuperSonics	38	44	.463
9	Portland Trail Blazers	29	53	.354

=== Game log ===
1970–71 game log
Total: 29–53 (home: 18–21; road: 9–26)
October: 0–0 (home: 0–0; road: 0–0)

Game	Date	Team	Score	High points	High rebounds	High assists	Location Attendance	Record
1	October 16	Cleveland	112–115	Jim Barnett (31)	4,273	1–0		
2	October 18	Boston	133–115	Jim Barnett (26)	6,301	1–1		
3	October 20	Cleveland	98–120	Ellis, Petrie (21)	2,709	2–1		
4	October 23	@ Seattle	111–141	McKenzie, Petrie (19)	9,201	2–2		
5	October 24	@ San Francisco^{[a]}	115–118	Geoff Petrie (38)	3,741	2–3		
6	October 25	Chicago	131–116	Geoff Petrie (26)	3,352	2–4		
7	October 27	Buffalo	108–119	Stan McKenzie (27)	3,289	3–4		
8	October 30	Seattle	115–104	Jim Barnett (20)	4,344	3–5		
9	October 31	Buffalo	102–107	Jim Barnett (38)	6,538	4–5		

November : 0–0 (home: 0–0; road: 0–0)

Game	Date	Team	Score	High points	High rebounds	High assists	Location Attendance	Record
10	November 3	Los Angeles	128–108	Jim Barnett (18)	7,286	4–6		
11	November 5	Baltimore	131–135	Jim Barnett (30)	3,593	5–6		
12	November 6	San Francisco	110–103	Geoff Petrie (23)	5,597	5–7		
13	November 8	New York	125–113	Jim Barnett (40)	10,259	5–8		
14	November 10	Cincinnati	138–121	Jim Barnett (23)	5,166	5–9		
15	November 11	@ Phoenix	100–114	Geoff Petrie (27)	6,029	5–10		
16	November 12	Cleveland	105–103	Jim Barnett (27)	2,173	5–11		
17	November 14	Cleveland	116–126	Jim Barnett (29)	4,592	6–11		
18	November 16	San Diego	136–118	Jim Barnett (24)	3,189	6–12		
19	November 17	Buffalo	102–101	Geoff Petrie (24)	1,973	6–13		
20	November 18	Atlanta	131–146	Jim Barnett (34)	6,670	7–13		
21	November 21	Buffalo^{[b]}	112–108	Ellis, Halimon (28)	11,316	8–13		
22	November 22	Milwaukee	126–104	Stan McKenzie (17)	9,471	8–14		
23	November 24	@ Baltimore	104–156	Geoff Petrie (22)	2,606	8–15		
24	November 25	@ Boston	115–122	Geoff Petrie (28)	7,573	8–16		
25	November 27	@ Cleveland	111–102	Jim Barnett (20)	3,021	9–16		
26	November 28	@ Buffalo	95–111	Shaler Halimon (23)	3,321	9–17		
27	November 29	@ Milwaukee	111–124	Ellis, Petrie (27)	9,849	9–18		

December : 0–0 (home: 0–0; road: 0–0)

Game	Date	Team	Score	High points	High rebounds	High assists	Location Attendance	Record
28	December 1	San Diego	120–114	Jim Barnett (27)	4,178	9–19		
29	December 4	Phoenix	126–121	Geoff Petrie (33)	3,927	9–20		
30	December 6	@ Los Angeles	120–131	LeRoy Ellis (29)	8,549	9–21		
31	December 8	@ New York	121–139	Geoff Petrie (30)	16,774	9–22		
32	December 9	@ Cleveland	109–102	Barnett, Petrie (25)	2,022	10–22		
33	December 11	@ Buffalo	120–105	Geoff Petrie (25)	2,176	11–22		
34	December 12	@ Atlanta	101–107	Jim Barnett (33)	5,976	11–23		
35	December 15	Detroit	111–103	Jim Barnett (20)	4,084	11–24		
36	December 18	San Francisco^{[c]}	122–118	Geoff Petrie (23)	7,683	11–25		
37	December 19	San Diego^{[a]}	118–108	LeRoy Ellis (25)	5,746	11–26		
38	December 20	Philadelphia	134–132 (OT)	Jim Barnett (31)	4,001	11–27		
39	December 26	@ Phoenix	103–115	Geoff Petrie (32)	6,102	11–28		
40	December 27	Boston	123–135	Geoff Petrie (31)	7,657	12–28		

January : 0–0 (home: 0–0; road: 0–0)

Game	Date	Team	Score	High points	High rebounds	High assists	Location Attendance	Record
41	January 1	@ Seattle	118–121	Geoff Petrie (40)	9,012	12–29		
42	January 2	Chicago	136–113	Geoff Petrie (32)	5,101	12–30		
43	January 4	@ Cleveland	119–106	Geoff Petrie (39)	1,737	13–30		
44	January 5	Boston^{[d]}	124–120	Geoff Petrie (28)	5,364	14–30		
45	January 6	@ Cincinnati	128–133 (OT)	Geoff Petrie (32)	2,279	14–31		
46	January 8	@ Chicago	113–105	Geoff Petrie (27)	5,116	15–31		
47	January 9	New York	96–114	Jim Barnett (32)	11,808	16–31		
48	January 14	Buffalo^{[e]}	113–119	Geoff Petrie (23)	1,339	16–32		
49	January 19	@ Chicago	111–123	LeRoy Ellis (27)	7,511	16–33		
50	January 20	@ Buffalo	106–126	Jim Barnett (35)	1,348	16–34		
51	January 22	@ Detroit	123–112	Geoff Petrie (28)	6,932	17–34		
52	January 23	@ Milwaukee	117–142	Dale Schlueter (20)	10,746	17–35		
53	January 24	@ Buffalo	111–123	Geoff Petrie (28)	3,067	17–36		
54	January 27	@ Cleveland	104–118	Geoff Petrie (29)	1,823	17–37		
55	January 29	Phoenix	131–122	Jim Barnett (27)	5,877	17–38		
56	January 31	@ Los Angeles	120–133	Barnett, Ellis (24)	11,018	17–39		

February : 0–0 (home: 0–0; road: 0–0)

Game	Date	Team	Score	High points	High rebounds	High assists	Location Attendance	Record
57	February 2	Milwaukee	111–123	Jim Barnett (27)	9,040	18–39		
58	February 4	Atlanta	123–137	LeRoy Ellis (27)	8,616	19–39		
59	February 5	San Francisco	117–123	Geoff Petrie (25)	5,628	20–39		
60	February 7	Cleveland	103–112	Geoff Petrie (24)	7,743	21–39		
61	February 12	Seattle	125–137	Geoff Petrie (43)	7,313	22–39		
62	February 16	Cincinnati^{[f]}	102–109	Geoff Petrie (31)	9,300	22–40		
63	February 17	@ Seattle	126–130	Geoff Petrie (26)	6,679	22–41		
64	February 18	Los Angeles	136–114	Geoff Petrie (36)	11,457	22–42		
65	February 20	Philadelphia	118–105	LeRoy Ellis (33)	6,970	22–43		
66	February 21	Cleveland	105–123	Geoff Petrie (38)	6,037	23–43		
67	February 23	@ Philadelphia	113–119	Geoff Petrie (43)	5,986	23–44		
68	February 24	@ Atlanta	107–118	Jim Barnett (26)	6,739	23–45		
69	February 26	@ Baltimore	97–114	Geoff Petrie (28)	9,773	23–46		
70	February 27	@ New York	102–113	Geoff Petrie (25)	19,500	23–47		

March : 0–0 (home: 0–0; road: 0–0)

Game	Date	Team	Score	High points	High rebounds	High assists	Location Attendance	Record
71	March 2	@ Detroit	122–128	Geoff Petrie (41)	2,827	23–48		
72	March 3	Philadelphia^{[g]}	104–120	Jim Barnett (19)	9,080	23–49		
73	March 5	Cincinnati^{[e]}	111–117	Geoff Petrie (25)	2,098	23–50		
74	March 7	@ San Diego	121–135	Geoff Petrie (40)	5,375	23–51		
75	March 8	Buffalo	114–98	Geoff Petrie (20)	4,785	23–52		
76	March 11	Baltimore	118–136	Geoff Petrie (30)	6,262	24–52		
77	March 12	Detroit	133–129	Geoff Petrie (33)	6,962	24–53		
78	March 14	Buffalo	112–122	Geoff Petrie (21)	6,727	25–53		
79	March 19	Seattle	128–135	Geoff Petrie (46)	11,140	26–53		
80	March 20	@ Buffalo	132–129 (OT)	Geoff Petrie (31)	8,123	27–53		
81	March 21	@ Cleveland	113–110	Geoff Petrie (23)	3,790	28–53		
82	March 23	@ Cleveland	114–112	Geoff Petrie (37)	6,422	29–53		

1970–71 schedule

Footnotes

- ^{a} The game was held at the Oakland Civic Auditorium in Oakland, California.
- ^{b} The game was held at Seattle Center Coliseum in Seattle, Washington.
- ^{c} The game was held at the San Diego Sports Arena in San Diego, California.
- ^{d} The game was held at the Spectrum in Philadelphia, Pennsylvania.
- ^{e} The game was held at War Memorial in Rochester, New York.
- ^{f} The game was held at McArthur Court in Eugene, Oregon.
- ^{g} The game was held at Boston Garden in Boston, Massachusetts.
- ^{e} The game was held at Omaha Civic Auditorium in Omaha, Nebraska.

== Player statistics ==
Legend
GP	Games played	GS	Games started	MPG	Minutes per game
FG%	Field-goal percentage	3P%	3-point field-goal percentage	FT%	Free-throw percentage
RPG	Rebounds per game	APG	Assists per game	SPG	Steals per game
BPG	Blocks per game	PPG	Points per game

Player	GP	GS	MPG	FG%	3P%	FT%	RPG	APG	SPG	BPG	PPG
Rick Adelman											
Jim Barnett											
Leroy Ellis											
Claude English											
Gary Gregor											
Shaler Halimon											
Ron Knight											
Ed Manning											
Stan McKenzie											
Dorie Murrey											
Geoff Petrie											
Dale Schlueter											
Bill Stricker											

== Transactions ==
- March 27, 1970: signed first-round draft pick Geoff Petrie
- April 1, 1970: signed second-round draft pick Walt Gilmore
- April 6, 1970: signed third-round draft pick Bill Cain and tenth-round draft pick Israel Oliver
- April 21, 1970: hired Rolland Todd as head coach
- April 27, 1970: hired Stu Inman chief scout and director of player personnel
- April 30, 1970: signed eighth-round draft pick Doug Boyd
- May 10, 1970: see Expansion Draft, traded Larry Siegfried to the San Diego Clippers in exchange for Jim Barnett.
- June 5, 1970: signed seventh-round draft pick Claude English and ninth-round draft pick Billy Gaskins
- August 11, 1970: signed expansion draft pick Rick Adelman
- August 19, 1970: signed expansion draft pick Pat Riley
- August 28, 1970: placed Fred Hetzel on waivers (claimed by the Los Angeles Lakers)
- September 3, 1970: signed expansion draft picks Stan McKenzie and Joe Kennedy
- September 11, 1970: re-signed Jim Barnett to a two-year contract valued at $35,000–$40,000 a year
- September 21, 1970: placed Bill Cain and Tim Robinson on waivers
- September 25, 1970: placed Walt Simon on waivers
- September 30, 1970: placed Joe Kennedy on waivers
- October 7, 1970: sold Pat Riley to the Los Angeles Lakers
- October 20, 1970: traded a 1971 NBA draft pick (second round) to the Chicago Bulls in exchange for Shaler Halimon
- October 22, 1970: traded Dorie Murrey to the Baltimore Bullets in exchange for a 1971 NBA draft pick (second round) and draft right to Bill Stricker
- October 26, 1970: signed free agent Bill Stricker
- November 16, 1970: waived Bill Stricker
- March 23, 1971: traded Jim Barnett to the San Francisco Warriors in exchange for two 1971 NBA draft picks (second and third rounds) and a 1972 NBA draft pick (second round)
- April 6, 1971: Waived Claude English

== Media ==
On September 13, 1970, the Trail Blazers announced that KPTV would broadcast 12 road games (all in color) during their inaugural season. Jimmy Jones was Portland's play-by-play announcer on television.

== Awards and honors ==
- Geoff Petrie, Co-Rookie of the Year
