= 1971–72 Portland Trail Blazers season =

NBA professional basketball team season

- Head coach: Rolland Todd (12–44); Stu Inman (6–20)
- General manager: Harry Glickman
- Owners: Herman Sarkowsky; Robert Schmertz; Larry Weinberg
- Arena: Memorial Coliseum

Results
- Record: 18–64 (.220)
- Place: Division: 5th (Pacific); Conference: 9th (Western)
- Playoff finish: Did not qualify
- Stats at Basketball Reference

Local media
- Television: KPTV
- Radio: KOIN

The 1971–72 Portland Trail Blazers season was the second season of the Portland Trail Blazers in the National Basketball Association (NBA). Geoff Petrie missed 22 games due to injury. Petrie who averaged 24.8 points per game in his rookie season would drop nearly 6 points per game as the Blazers finished with an NBA worst record of 18–64, which remains their worst season record five and a half decades later. One of the highlights of the season was Sidney Wicks, who would win the Rookie of the Year with a team best 24.5 points per game.

Before the start of the season, Blazers guard Rick Adelman was named captain, making him the first in franchise history.

Portland head coach Rolland Todd was fired on February 2, 1972, and replaced by Stu Inman, the Blazers director of player personnel. Todd's dismissal came in the wake of a 129–117 loss to the Phoenix Suns the day before. Portland players were allegedly upset with team management for placing guard Willie McCarter on waivers. Sidney Wicks was accused by Todd and Inman of playing lackadaisical defense, allowing his opponent Paul Silas to take 30 shots against him. Charlie Yelverton sat on the bench during th U.S. national anthem and did not participate in pre-game warmups.

== Roster ==
Portland Trail Blazers roster
Players

| Pos. | No. | Player | Height | Weight | DOB | From |
|---|---|---|---|---|---|---|
| PG | 12 | Rick Adelman | 6 ft 1 in (1.85 m) | 175 lb (79 kg) | 1946-06-16 | Loyola Marymount |
| SF | 44 | Gary Gregor | 6 ft 7 in (2.01 m) | 225 lb (102 kg) | 1945-08-13 | South Carolina |
| C | 30−35 | Darrall Imhoff | 6 ft 10 in (2.08 m) | 220 lb (100 kg) | 1938-10-11 | California |
| SF | 38 | Ron Knight | 6 ft 7 in (2.01 m) | 215 lb (98 kg) | 1947-08-04 | Cal State LA |
| SF | 41 | Jim Marsh | 6 ft 7 in (2.01 m) | 215 lb (98 kg) | 1946-04-26 | USC |
| SG | 17 | Willie McCarter | 6 ft 3 in (1.91 m) | 175 lb (79 kg) | 1946-07-26 | Drake |
| SF | 40 | Stan McKenzie | 6 ft 5 in (1.96 m) | 195 lb (88 kg) | 1944-10-06 | NYU |
| SG | 45 | Geoff Petrie | 6 ft 4 in (1.93 m) | 190 lb (86 kg) | 1948-04-17 | Princeton |
| C | 54 | Dale Schlueter | 6 ft 10 in (2.08 m) | 225 lb (102 kg) | 1945-11-12 | Colorado State |
| C | 43 | William Smith | 7 ft 0 in (2.13 m) | 220 lb (100 kg) | 1949-02-14 | Syracuse |
| SG | 15 | Larry Steele | 6 ft 5 in (1.96 m) | 180 lb (82 kg) | 1949-05-05 | Kentucky |
| PF | 21 | Sidney Wicks | 6 ft 8 in (2.03 m) | 225 lb (102 kg) | 1949-09-19 | UCLA |
| SG | 11 | Charlie Yelverton | 6 ft 2 in (1.88 m) | 190 lb (86 kg) | 1948-12-05 | Fordham |

Coaches
Head coach
- Stu Inman

Legend
- (DP) Unsigned draft pick
- (FA) Free agent
- (S) Suspended
- Injured

Roster
Updated: February 3, 1972

== Regular season ==
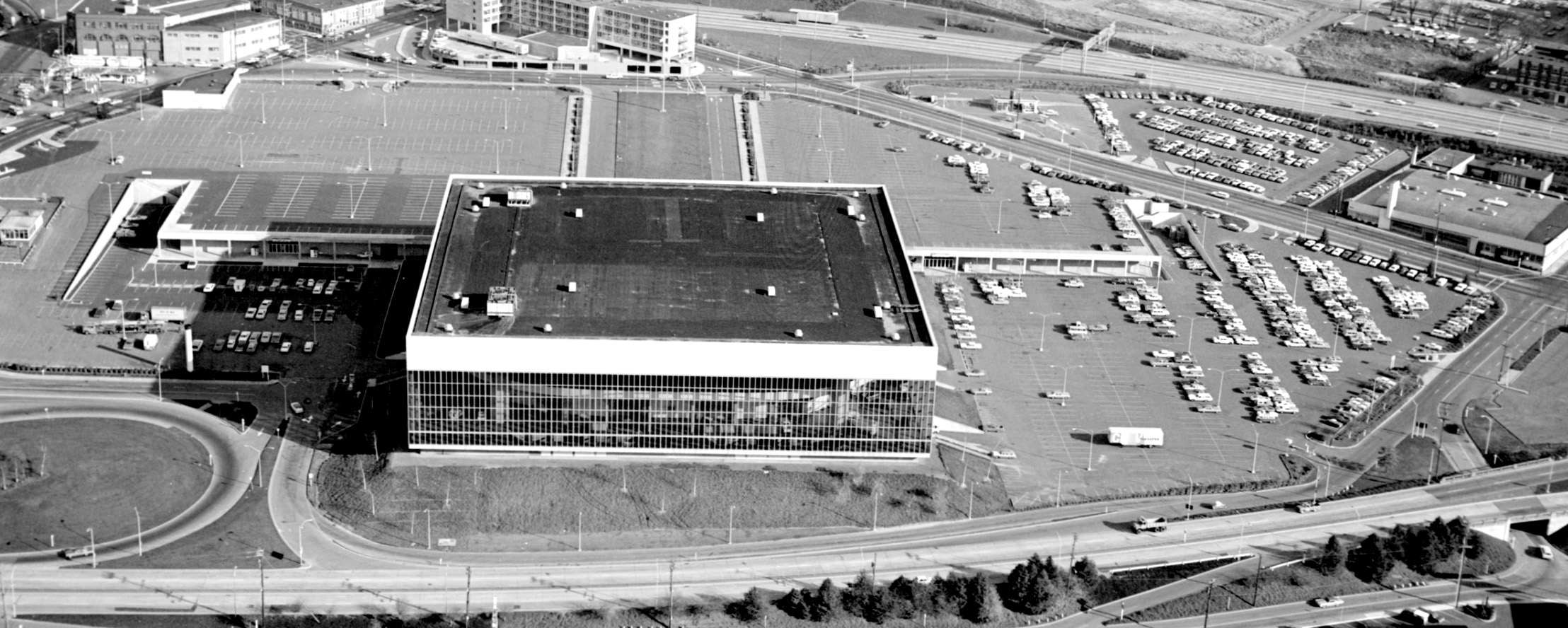
The Trail Blazers played their home games at Veterans Memorial Coliseum.

=== Season standings ===
| Pacific Division | W | L | PCT | GB | Home | Road | Neutral | Div |
|---|---|---|---|---|---|---|---|---|
| y-Los Angeles Lakers | 69 | 13 | .841 | – | 36–5 | 31–7 | 2–1 | 21–3 |
| x-Golden State Warriors | 51 | 31 | .622 | 18 | 27–8 | 21–20 | 3–3 | 14–10 |
| Seattle SuperSonics | 47 | 35 | .573 | 22 | 28–12 | 18–22 | 1–1 | 12–12 |
| Houston Rockets | 34 | 48 | .415 | 35 | 15–20 | 14–23 | 5–5 | 9–15 |
| Portland Trail Blazers | 18 | 64 | .220 | 51 | 14–26 | 4–35 | 0–3 | 4–20 |

| # | Western Conference | | | |
| # | Team | W | L | PCT |
|---|---|---|---|---|
| 1 | z-Los Angeles Lakers | 69 | 13 | .841 |
| 2 | y-Milwaukee Bucks | 63 | 19 | .768 |
| 3 | x-Chicago Bulls | 57 | 25 | .695 |
| 4 | x-Golden State Warriors | 51 | 31 | .622 |
| 5 | Phoenix Suns | 49 | 33 | .598 |
| 6 | Seattle SuperSonics | 47 | 35 | .573 |
| 7 | Houston Rockets | 34 | 48 | .415 |
| 8 | Detroit Pistons | 26 | 56 | .317 |
| 9 | Portland Trail Blazers | 18 | 64 | .220 |

=== Game log ===
1971–72 Game log
| # | Date | Opponent | Score | High points | Record |
| 1 | October 15 | Seattle | 119–88 | Stan McKenzie (22) | 0–1 |
| 2 | October 17 | Milwaukee | 127–94 | Sidney Wicks (23) | 0–2 |
| 3 | October 19 | Detroit | 101–99 | Stan McKenzie (25) | 0–3 |
| 4 | October 23 | Cincinnati | 100–104 | Sidney Wicks (34) | 1–3 |
| 5 | October 26 | Chicago | 123–111 | Sidney Wicks (24) | 1–4 |
| 6 | October 29 | Buffalo | 120–119 | Sidney Wicks (28) | 1–5 |
| 7 | November 4 | @ Houston | 112–110 | Sidney Wicks (31) | 2–5 |
| 8 | November 6 | @ Boston | 109–124 | Sidney Wicks (25) | 2–6 |
| 9 | November 7 | @ Cleveland | 99–120 | Willie McCarter (13) | 2–7 |
| 10 | November 9 | @ Buffalo | 100–109 | Sidney Wicks (34) | 2–8 |
| 11 | November 10 | @ Detroit | 122–139 | Sidney Wicks (31) | 2–9 |
| 12 | November 12 | Cleveland | 106–104 | Dale Schlueter (18) | 2–10 |
| 13 | November 13 | Los Angeles | 130–108 | Sidney Wicks (33) | 2–11 |
| 14 | November 16 | Milwaukee | 125–105 | Sidney Wicks (20) | 2–12 |
| 15 | November 18 | @ Golden State | 105–115 | Sidney Wicks (29) | 2–13 |
| 16 | November 19 | Cleveland | 105–118 | Stan McKenzie (31) | 3–13 |
| 17 | November 20 | Seattle | 104–100 | Sidney Wicks (27) | 3–14 |
| 18 | November 23 | @ Chicago | 94–130 | Sidney Wicks (27) | 3–15 |
| 19 | November 24 | @ Cincinnati | 112–114 | Stan McKenzie (29) | 3–16 |
| 20 | November 26 | @ Milwaukee | 105–120 | Sidney Wicks (30) | 3–17 |
| 21 | November 27 | @ Philadelphia | 93–116 | Sidney Wicks (22) | 3–18 |
| 22 | November 30 | Phoenix | 121–111 (OT) | Sidney Wicks (23) | 3–19 |
| 23 | December 1 | @ Phoenix | 103–139 | Sidney Wicks (27) | 3–20 |
| 24 | December 3 | Golden State | 107–115 | Geoff Petrie (35) | 4–20 |
| 25 | December 5 | @ Los Angeles | 107–123 | Gary Gregor (20) | 4–21 |
| 26 | December 7 | @ Detroit | 131–130 (OT) | Geoff Petrie (36) | 5–21 |
| 27 | December 8 | @ Baltimore | 97–115 | Sidney Wicks (24) | 5–22 |
| 28 | December 10 | @ Buffalo | 101–100 (OT) | Geoff Petrie (28) | 6–22 |
| 29 | December 11 | @ New York | 102–134 | Willie McCarter (16) | 6–23 |
| 30 | December 14 | Los Angeles | 129–114 | Sidney Wicks (31) | 6–24 |
| 31 | December 17 | Philadelphia | 126–127 | Gary Gregor (28) | 7–24 |
| 32 | December 18 | @ Seattle | 105–107 | Sidney Wicks (28) | 7–25 |
| 33 | December 19 | Detroit | 113–114 | Sidney Wicks (26) | 8–25 |
| 34 | December 21 | Houston | 132–119 | McKenzie, Wicks (24) | 8–26 |
| 35 | December 23 | New York | 120–117 | Stan McKenzie (27) | 8–27 |
| 36 | December 25 | Chicago | 109–88 | Sidney Wicks (24) | 8–28 |
| 37 | December 27 | @ Atlanta | 121–135 | Geoff Petrie (23) | 8–29 |
| 38 | December 28 | @ Cleveland | 111–112 | Geoff Petrie (26) | 8–30 |
| 39 | December 29 | @ Milwaukee | 84–123 | Dale Schlueter (18) | 8–31 |
| 40 | December 30 | @ Chicago | 92–117 | Sidney Wicks (23) | 8–32 |
| 41 | January 2 | Buffalo | 90–108 | Sidney Wicks (30) | 9–32 |
| 42 | January 4 | Atlanta | 103–91 | Sidney Wicks (22) | 9–33 |
| 43 | January 6 | @ Golden State | 115–119 | Sidney Wicks (29) | 9–34 |
| 44 | January 7 | Boston | 120–114 | Geoff Petrie (24) | 9–35 |
| 45 | January 8 | Cleveland | 102–125 | Geoff Petrie (22) | 10–35 |
| 46 | January 11 | Baltimore | 106–114 | Gary Gregor (25) | 11–35 |
| 47 | January 14 | @ Buffalo | 102–100 | Sidney Wicks (28) | 12–35 |
| 48 | January 15 | @ Chicago | 100–120 | Geoff Petrie (21) | 12–36 |
| 49 | January 16 | @ Milwaukee | 97–126 | Sidney Wicks (25) | 12–37 |
| 50 | January 21 | N Philadelphia | 122–136 | Sidney Wicks (30) | 12–38 |
| 51 | January 22 | N Baltimore | 99–116 | Sidney Wicks (19) | 12–39 |
| 52 | January 23 | @ Boston | 105–115 | Sidney Wicks (25) | 12–40 |
| 53 | January 25 | @ Houston | 104–118 | Sidney Wicks (30) | 12–41 |
| 54 | January 28 | Golden State | 105–102 | Sidney Wicks (25) | 12–42 |
| 55 | January 30 | @ Los Angeles | 131–153 | Stan McKenzie (22) | 12–43 |
| 56 | February 1 | Phoenix | 129–117 | Geoff Petrie (25) | 12–44 |
| 57 | February 4 | Houston | 113–114 | Sidney Wicks (30) | 13–44 |
| 58 | February 5 | Phoenix | 118–117 (OT) | Sidney Wicks (32) | 13–45 |
| 59 | February 6 | @ Phoenix | 94–107 | Geoff Petrie (33) | 13–46 |
| 60 | February 8 | Cincinnati | 100–104 | Geoff Petrie (30) | 14–46 |
| 61 | February 11 | Philadelphia | 106–110 | Sidney Wicks (28) | 15–46 |
| 62 | February 12 | @ Seattle | 97–125 | Sidney Wicks (21) | 15–47 |
| 63 | February 13 | Seattle | 127–117 (OT) | Sidney Wicks (32) | 15–48 |
| 64 | February 15 | Boston | 111–104 | Sidney Wicks (30) | 15–49 |
| 65 | February 18 | @ Los Angeles | 114–125 | Rick Adelman (24) | 15–50 |
| 66 | February 19 | Los Angeles | 115–94 | Sidney Wicks (23) | 15–51 |
| 67 | February 20 | @ Seattle | 105–109 | Sidney Wicks (24) | 15–52 |
| 68 | February 22 | @ New York | 105–122 | Petrie, Wicks (21) | 15–53 |
| 69 | February 23 | @ Cincinnati | 106–110 | Sidney Wicks (30) | 15–54 |
| 70 | February 25 | @ Cleveland | 104–113 | Geoff Petrie (29) | 15–55 |
| 71 | February 27 | @ Atlanta | 110–113 | Sidney Wicks (32) | 15–56 |
| 72 | February 29 | Chicago | 116–92 | Petrie, Wicks (20) | 15–57 |
| 73 | March 3 | Baltimore | 90–80 | Sidney Wicks (28) | 15–58 |
| 74 | March 4 | Atlanta | 120–101 | Sidney Wicks (24) | 15–59 |
| 75 | March 7 | Buffalo | 94–98 | Sidney Wicks (24) | 16–59 |
| 76 | March 9 | N Houston | 111–114 | Sidney Wicks (30) | 16–60 |
| 77 | March 14 | Milwaukee | 109–98 | Sidney Wicks (28) | 16–61 |
| 78 | March 16 | @ Golden State | 94–107 | Sidney Wicks (28) | 16–62 |
| 79 | March 17 | Golden State | 109–114 | Geoff Petrie (39) | 17–62 |
| 80 | March 18 | New York | 86–133 | Sidney Wicks (30) | 18–62 |
| 81 | March 21 | @ Phoenix | 128–160 | Sidney Wicks (31) | 18–63 |
| 82 | March 26 | @ Houston | 109–131 | Geoff Petrie (26) | 18–64 |

== Awards and honors ==
- Sidney Wicks, NBA Rookie of the Year Award
- Sidney Wicks, NBA All-Rookie Team 1st Team
