= Rick Adelman =

American basketball player and coach (1946–2026)

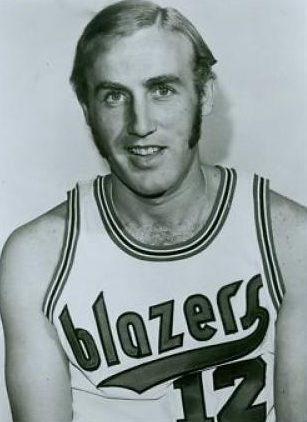
- Adelman with the Portland Trail Blazers in 1970

Personal information
- Born: June 16, 1946 Lynwood, California, U.S.
- Died: June 1, 2026 (aged 79) Portland, Oregon, U.S.
- Listed height: 6 ft 1 in (1.85 m)
- Listed weight: 175 lb (79 kg)

Career information
- High school: St. Pius X (Downey, California)
- College: Loyola Marymount (1965–1968)
- NBA draft: 1968: 7th round, 79th overall pick
- Drafted by: San Diego Rockets
- Playing career: 1968–1975
- Position: Point guard
- Number: 12, 21, 5
- Coaching career: 1977–2014

Career history

Playing
- 1968–1970: San Diego Rockets
- 1970–1973: Portland Trail Blazers
- 1973–1974: Chicago Bulls
- 1974–1975: New Orleans Jazz
- 1975: Kansas City-Omaha Kings

Career highlights
- As player: WCC Player of the Year (1968); 2× First-team All-WCC (1967, 1968); As coach: 3× NBA All-Star Game head coach (1991, 2001, 2003); Chuck Daly Lifetime Achievement Award (2023)

Career playing statistics
- Points: 3,579 (7.7 ppg)
- Rebounds: 1,129 (2.4 rpg)
- Assists: 1,606 (3.5 apg)
- Stats at NBA.com
- Stats at Basketball Reference

Career coaching record
- NBA: 1042–749 (.582)
- Record at Basketball Reference
- Basketball Hall of Fame

Richard Leonard Adelman (June 16, 1946 – June 1, 2026) was an American professional basketball player and coach. He coached 23 seasons in the National Basketball Association (NBA), serving as head coach of the Portland Trail Blazers, Golden State Warriors, Sacramento Kings, Houston Rockets, and Minnesota Timberwolves. He was inducted into the Naismith Basketball Hall of Fame in Springfield, Massachusetts, in the class of 2021. As a coach he won 1,042 games, which at the time of his death was the tenth-highest in league history. Adelman never won a title, but led many of his teams to deep runs in the playoffs including two trips to the NBA Finals with Portland.

== Early life and playing career ==
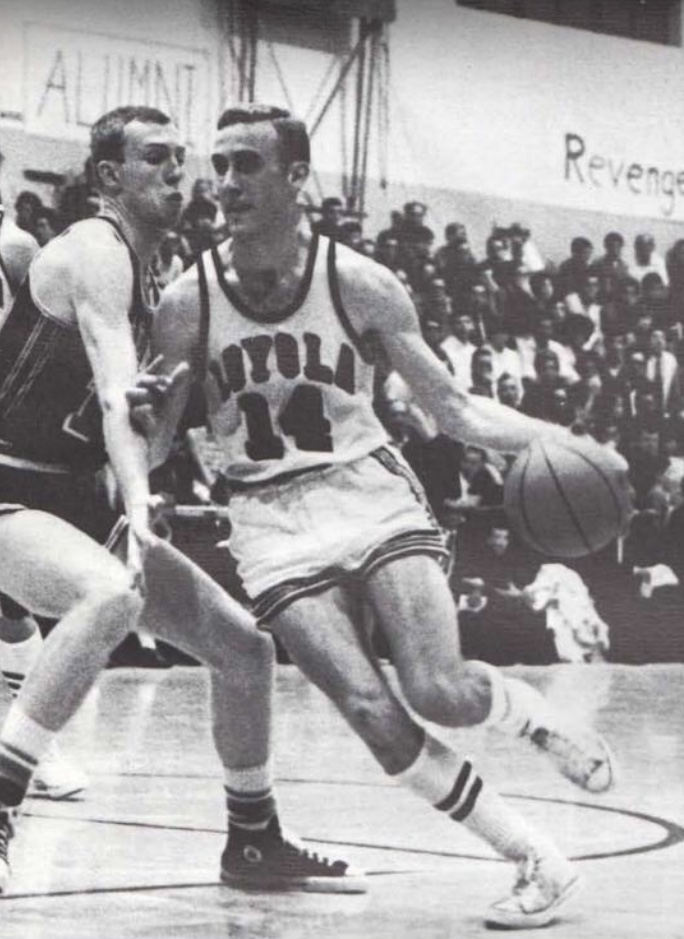
Adelman at Loyola University

Adelman was born in Lynwood, California, the son of Gladys (née Olsen) and Leonard Joseph "L. J." Adelman, who were from North Dakota and worked as teachers and farmers. He began his basketball career in high school at Pius X High School in Downey, California, then matriculated to collegiate stardom at Loyola University of Los Angeles, now known as Loyola Marymount University. In the 1968 NBA draft, he was selected by the San Diego Rockets in the 7th round. He played two seasons in San Diego before being taken by the expansion Portland Trail Blazers in the 1970 expansion draft. After three seasons with Portland, Adelman played for the Chicago Bulls, New Orleans Jazz, and the Kansas City/Omaha Kings before retiring in 1975.

== Coaching career ==
=== Chemeketa Community College ===
From 1977 to 1983, Adelman coached at Chemeketa Community College in Salem, Oregon.

=== Portland Trail Blazers ===
He was then hired by the Portland Trail Blazers (then coached by Jack Ramsay) as an assistant. When Ramsay was fired and replaced with Mike Schuler in 1986, Adelman was retained; when Schuler was in turn fired during the 1988–89 season, Adelman was promoted to interim coach. After leading the team into the playoffs that year (despite a 39–43 record), Adelman was given the coaching position on a full-time basis in the 1989 off-season.

The next three years were quite successful for Adelman and the Trail Blazers; the team went to the NBA Finals in 1990 and 1992 (losing to the Detroit Pistons and the Chicago Bulls, respectively) and went to the Western Conference finals in 1991 (losing to the Los Angeles Lakers). Adelman spent two more years with the team, but was dismissed after the 1993–1994 season.

=== Golden State Warriors ===
After a year sidelined from the sidelines, Adelman was hired as the head coach of the Golden State Warriors on May 19, 1995, fresh off the heels of an injury-riddled 26-win season prior to his hiring. He was unable to have a winning season in two years there, with his first season seeing the team win just ten of their last 28 games on their way to a 36–46 record.

The team finished last in the division with 30 wins. On April 28, 1997, Adelman and his assistants were fired, with Adelman saying that he had felt it seemed inevitable by February.

=== Sacramento Kings ===
Sitting out a season again, Adelman was hired by the Sacramento Kings in 1998. Under Adelman's guidance, the Kings were one of the most successful teams in the Western Conference, qualifying for the playoffs every year of his tenure there: their first consecutive playoff appearances since 1979–1981.

During the Kings' 2000 playoff run, they met Phil Jackson's Los Angeles Lakers. Adelman questioned Jackson's motivational techniques when it was learned that Jackson compared Adelman to Adolf Hitler. In 2002, the Kings made a serious run for the NBA Finals. After clinching the first seed in the competitive Western Conference, the Kings blazed through the opening two rounds but lost to the Lakers in the Western Conference Finals, in one of the most controversial NBA playoff series of all time.

Despite his relative success in playoff appearances, Adelman did not get along with the Maloof brothers. In 2006, Adelman (in the final year of his contract) led the Kings to the playoffs. Despite the team struggling early in the regular season, the Kings rebounded and qualified for the playoffs as the #8 seed. Although competitive, they were defeated in six games by the defending champion San Antonio Spurs. Adelman's contract with the Kings expired at the end of the 2005–2006 season. On May 9, it was reported by the Sacramento Bee that his contract would not be renewed. The Kings did not reach the playoffs again until 2023, nearly 17 years later. Adelman remains the only coach in the Sacramento era to reach the playoffs more than once during his tenure with the team.

=== Houston Rockets ===
The Houston Rockets brought in Adelman as their new head coach five days after the dismissal of Jeff Van Gundy on May 18, 2007. Van Gundy had taken the Rockets to three playoff appearances in four years with no series victories. In his first season as head coach, Adelman guided the Rockets to a 22-game winning streak from January through March 2008, the third-longest winning streak in NBA history. However, they lost in the first round of the playoffs again, this time in six games.

In the 2008-09 season, the Rockets finished fifth in the West with a 53–29 record. They entered the playoffs without their star shooting guard, Tracy McGrady, due to an injury. Despite this loss, the Rockets defeated the Portland Trail Blazers in six games to advance to the Western Conference Semifinals for the first time since 1997. Although they would lose the series to the Los Angeles Lakers, they proved their resilience by taking the series to seven games despite the loss of star center Yao Ming in Game 3. Adelman won his 800th career game, 13th among coaches in NBA history, on March 24, 2008, against the Sacramento Kings. On April 18, 2011, the Houston Chronicle reported that the Rockets would not give Adelman a new contract; Adelman and the team parted ways after four seasons and two playoff appearances.

=== Minnesota Timberwolves ===
On September 13, 2011, the Minnesota Timberwolves confirmed the hiring of Adelman as their new coach. On April 6, 2013, Adelman won his 1,000th career game with a victory over the Detroit Pistons, becoming just the eighth coach in NBA history ever to do so.

On April 21, 2014, Adelman announced his retirement from coaching in the NBA. It was also announced that he would stay with the Timberwolves as a consultant. Adelman ranks ninth in terms of games coached and games won. He went 79–78 (.503) in playoff games and advanced to the NBA Finals twice, both times with the Portland Trail Blazers in 1990 and 1992 where they lost to the Detroit Pistons and Chicago Bulls.

== Personal life and death ==
In 2014, a year after retirement, Adelman and his wife Mary Kay moved to Portland to be with their family, which included six children and eleven grandchildren.

Adelman's eldest son, R.J., was a lawyer who held various team front office roles in the NBA before he died in an auto-pedestrian accident in 2018, aged 44. Another son, David, is the head coach of the Denver Nuggets.

Adelman died on June 1, 2026, at the age of 79. His official cause of death has not been disclosed.

== Career playing statistics ==
Legend
GP	Games played	GS	Games started	MPG	Minutes per game
FG%	Field goal percentage	3P%	3-point field goal percentage	FT%	Free throw percentage
RPG	Rebounds per game	APG	Assists per game	SPG	Steals per game
BPG	Blocks per game	PPG	Points per game	**Bold**	Career high

=== NBA ===
==== Regular season ====
Year	Team	GP	MPG	FG%	FT%	RPG	APG	SPG	BPG	PPG
1968–69	San Diego	77	18.8	.394	.642	2.8	3.1			6.3
1969–70	San Diego	35	20.5	.389	.747	2.3	3.2			7.4
1970–71	Portland	**81**	28.4	.422	.724	**3.5**	4.7			**12.6**
1971–72	Portland	80	**30.6**	.437	.751	2.9	**5.2**			10.1
1972–73	Portland	76	24.0	.408	.716	2.1	3.9			6.6
1973–74	Chicago	55	11.2	.376	.711	1.3	1.0	.7	.0	3.3
1974–75	Chicago	12	28.3	.413	.718	2.2	2.9	1.3	.1	9.5
1974–75	New Orleans	28	21.9	.421	.695	2.0	2.5	**1.7**	**.2**	6.3
1974–75	Kansas City–Omaha	18	6.7	**.464**	**.800**	.8	.4	.4	.1	1.7
Career		462	22.6	.415	.713	2.4	3.5	.9	.1	7.7

==== Playoffs ====
Year	Team	GP	MPG	FG%	FT%	RPG	APG	SPG	BPG	PPG
1969	San Diego	6	**31.2**	.453	.595	**2.5**	**4.8**			**11.7**
1974	Chicago	**9**	12.0	**.471**	.636	1.1	.8	**.8**	.0	4.3
1975	Kansas City–Omaha	6	5.7	.333	**.750**	.3	.5	.2	.0	2.0
Playoffs		21	15.7	.448	.625	1.3	1.9	.5	.0	5.8

== Head coaching record ==
Legend
Regular season	G	Games coached	W	Games won	L	Games lost	W–L %	Win–loss %
Playoffs	PG	Playoff games	PW	Playoff wins	PL	Playoff losses	PW–L %	Playoff win–loss %

Team	Year	G	W	L	W–L%	Finish	PG	PW	PL	PW–L%	Result
Portland	1988–89	35	14	21	.400	5th in Pacific	3	0	3	.000	Lost in First Round
Portland	1989–90	82	59	23	.720	2nd in Pacific	21	12	9	.571	Lost in NBA Finals
Portland	1990–91	82	63	19	.768	1st in Pacific	16	9	7	.563	Lost in Conf. Finals
Portland	1991–92	82	57	25	.695	1st in Pacific	21	13	8	.619	Lost in NBA Finals
Portland	1992–93	82	51	31	.622	3rd in Pacific	4	1	3	.250	Lost in First Round
Portland	1993–94	82	47	35	.573	4th in Pacific	4	1	3	.250	Lost in First Round
Golden State	1995–96	82	36	46	.439	6th in Pacific	—	—	—	—	Missed Playoffs
Golden State	1996–97	82	30	52	.366	7th in Pacific	—	—	—	—	Missed Playoffs
Sacramento	1998–99	50	27	23	.540	3rd in Pacific	5	2	3	.400	Lost in First Round
Sacramento	1999–00	82	44	38	.537	5th in Pacific	5	2	3	.400	Lost in First Round
Sacramento	2000–01	82	55	27	.671	2nd in Pacific	8	3	5	.375	Lost in Conf. Semifinals
Sacramento	2001–02	82	61	21	.744	1st in Pacific	16	10	6	.625	Lost in Conf. Finals
Sacramento	2002–03	82	59	23	.720	1st in Pacific	12	7	5	.583	Lost in Conf. Semifinals
Sacramento	2003–04	82	55	27	.671	2nd in Pacific	12	7	5	.583	Lost in Conf. Semifinals
Sacramento	2004–05	82	50	32	.610	2nd in Pacific	5	1	4	.200	Lost in First Round
Sacramento	2005–06	82	44	38	.537	4th in Pacific	6	2	4	.333	Lost in First Round
Houston	2007–08	82	55	27	.671	3rd in Southwest	6	2	4	.333	Lost in First Round
Houston	2008–09	82	53	29	.654	2nd in Southwest	13	7	6	.538	Lost in Conf. Semifinals
Houston	2009–10	82	42	40	.512	3rd in Southwest	—	—	—	—	Missed Playoffs
Houston	2010–11	82	43	39	.524	5th in Southwest	—	—	—	—	Missed Playoffs
Minnesota	2011–12	66	26	40	.394	5th in Northwest	—	—	—	—	Missed Playoffs
Minnesota	2012–13	82	31	51	.378	5th in Northwest	—	—	—	—	Missed Playoffs
Minnesota	2013–14	82	40	42	.488	3rd in Northwest	—	—	—	—	Missed Playoffs
Career		1,791	1,042	749	.582		157	79	78	.503	
