= Mike Schuler =

American basketball coach (1940–2022)

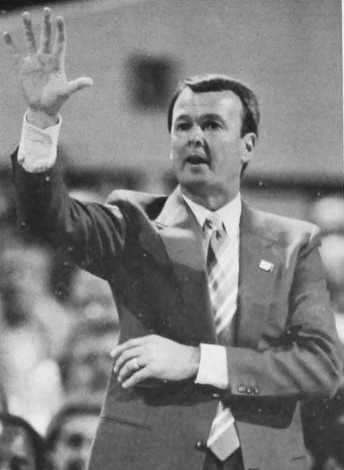
- Schuler in 1987

Personal information
- Born: September 22, 1940 Portsmouth, Ohio, U.S.
- Died: June 28, 2022 (aged 81)
- Listed height: 5 ft 11 in (1.80 m)
- Listed weight: 165 lb (75 kg)

Career information
- High school: Portsmouth (Portsmouth, Ohio)
- College: Ohio (1959–1962)
- Coaching career: 1965–2005

Career history

Coaching
- 1965–1966: Army (assistant)
- 1966–1969: Ohio (assistant)
- 1969–1972: VMI
- 1972–1977: Virginia (assistant)
- 1977–1981: Rice
- 1981–1983: New Jersey Nets (assistant)
- 1983–1986: Milwaukee Bucks (assistant)
- 1986–1989: Portland Trail Blazers
- 1989–1990: Golden State Warriors (assistant)
- 1990–1992: Los Angeles Clippers
- 1992–1994: Sacramento Kings (assistant)
- 1994–1996: Minnesota Timberwolves (assistant)
- 2003–2005: Milwaukee Bucks (assistant)

Career highlights
- As coach: NBA Coach of the Year (1987)

Michael Harold Schuler (September 22, 1940 – June 28, 2022) was an American basketball coach in both college and the National Basketball Association (NBA). He was the head coach of the Portland Trail Blazers and Los Angeles Clippers from 1986 to 1992 and compiled a win–loss record of 179–159. He won the NBA Coach of the Year Award in 1987, becoming the second rookie coach to be conferred the honor.

== Early life ==
Michael Harold Schuler was born on September 22, 1940, in Portsmouth, Ohio, on September 22, 1940. He attended Portsmouth High School in his hometown. He was then awarded an NCAA Division I scholarship to study at Ohio University, where he played for the Ohio Bobcats and won two Mid-American Conference championships with the team. He graduated in 1962.

== Coaching career ==
=== Army (1965–1966) ===
Schuler started his coaching career in 1965, working as an assistant for the Army Black Knights.

=== Ohio (1966–1969) ===
Schuler then went back to Ohio, his alma mater, and was an assistant coach there for three seasons.

=== VMI (1969–1972) ===
Schuler subsequently joined the Virginia Military Institute as its head coach in 1969. During his three seasons with the Keydets, the team recorded a .171 winning percentage (13–63).

=== Virginia (1972–1977) ===
Schuler had a four-season stint as an assistant at the University of Virginia.

=== Rice (1977–1981) ===
Schuler became head coach of the Rice Owls in 1977. He served in that capacity until 1981, compiling a .283 winning percentage (30–76) during his tenure there.

=== New Jersey Nets (1981–1983) ===
Schuler garnered his first professional coaching position in 1981 as an assistant coach with the New Jersey Nets. He worked in that role for two seasons.

=== Milwaukee Bucks (1983–1986) ===
Schuler become an assistant coach with the Milwaukee Bucks from 1983 to 1986.

=== Portland Trail Blazers (1986–1989) ===
Schuler was subsequently hired as head coach of the Portland Trail Blazers. One incident he was remembered for occurred at the first press conference that introduced him as the coach of the Trail Blazers, when he fell out of his chair. The footage was seen often on American television in the following days, and Schuler termed it "my instant claim to fame".

During his first season as coach of the Blazers, Schuler led the franchise to a 49–33 record. He was first named NBA Coach of the Month in February 1987, before winning the NBA Coach of the Year Award later that year. He was the second rookie coach to receive the latter award, and one of only five to achieve the feat at the time of his death. He followed that up with a 53–29 campaign, though the season ended in a first-round playoff defeat. In his third season with the Blazers, the team was racked with dissension and posted a 25–22 record before Schuler was fired in mid-February. He recorded a .602 winning percentage (127–84) with the Trail Blazers. Then-assistant coach Rick Adelman was promoted to replace him on an interim basis. After the Blazers reached the 1989 NBA Playoffs and were swept in the first round by the Lakers, Adelman was made the head coach on a permanent basis.

=== Golden State Warriors (1989–1990) ===
Schuler served as assistant coach of the Golden State Warriors for the 1989–90 season.

=== Los Angeles Clippers (1990–1992) ===
Schuler become head coach of the Los Angeles Clippers the following year. He served in that role until he was dismissed halfway through the 1991–92 season, compiling a .409 winning percentage (52–75) during his time with the Clippers.

=== Sacramento Kings (1992–1994) ===
Schuler was an assistant coach with the Sacramento Kings from 1992 to 1994.

=== Minnesota Timberwolves (1994–1996) ===
Schuler was an assistant coach with the Minnesota Timberwolves from 1994 to 1997.

=== Milwaukee Bucks (2003–2005) ===
Schuler later returned to the Milwaukee Bucks as an assistant coach in 2003, before retiring at the end of the 2004–05 season.

== Personal life ==
Schuler married Gloria Sissea in July 1963. They remained married for 53 years until her death in 2016. Together, they had two daughters: Kimberly and Kristin.

Schuler died on June 28, 2022, at the age of 81.

== Head coaching record ==
Legend
Regular season	G	Games coached	W	Games won	L	Games lost	W–L %	Win–loss %
Playoffs	PG	Playoff games	PW	Playoff wins	PL	Playoff losses	PW–L %	Playoff win–loss %

Team	Year	G	W	L	W–L%	Finish	PG	PW	PL	PW–L%	Result
Portland	1986–87	82	49	33	.598	2nd in Pacific	4	1	3	.250	Lost in First Round
Portland	1987–88	82	53	29	.646	2nd in Pacific	4	1	3	.250	Lost in First Round
Portland	1988–89	47	25	22	.532	(fired)	—	—	—	—	—
L.A. Clippers	1990–91	82	31	51	.378	6th in Pacific	—	—	—	—	Missed Playoffs
L.A. Clippers	1991–92	45	21	24	.467	(fired)	—	—	—	—	—
Career		338	179	159	.530		8	2	6	.250	
