= Geoff Petrie =

American former basketball player (born 1948)

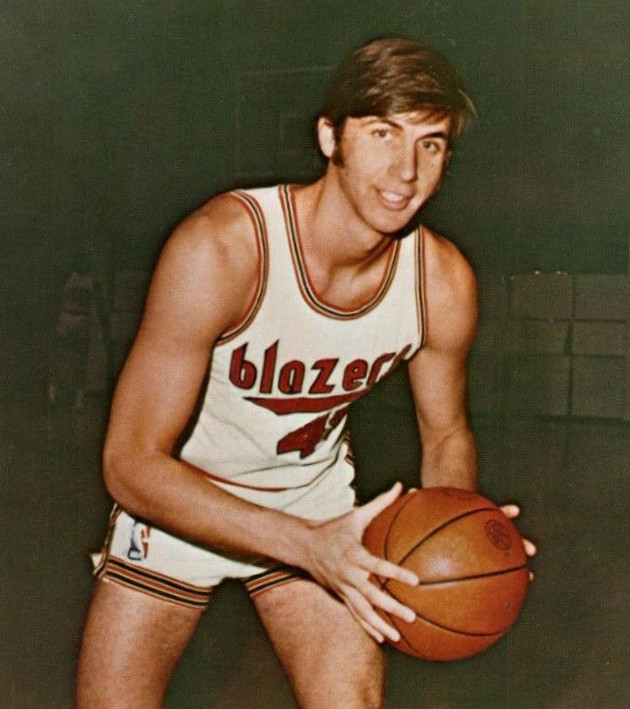
- Petrie, c. 1971

Personal information
- Born: April 17, 1948 (age 78) Darby, Pennsylvania, U.S.
- Listed height: 6 ft 4 in (1.93 m)
- Listed weight: 190 lb (86 kg)

Career information
- High school: Springfield (Springfield, Pennsylvania)
- College: Princeton (1967–1970)
- NBA draft: 1970: 1st round, 8th overall pick
- Drafted by: Portland Trail Blazers
- Playing career: 1970–1976
- Position: Point guard / shooting guard
- Number: 45

Career history
- 1970–1976: Portland Trail Blazers

Career highlights
- As player: 2× NBA All-Star (1971, 1974); NBA Rookie of the Year (1971); NBA All-Rookie First Team (1971); No. 45 retired by Portland Trail Blazers; 2× First-team All-Ivy League (1968, 1969); Second-team All-Ivy League (1970); As executive: 2× NBA Executive of the Year (1999, 2001)

Career statistics
- Points: 9,732 (21.8 ppg)
- Rebounds: 1,271 (2.8 rpg)
- Assists: 2,057 (4.6 apg)
- Stats at NBA.com
- Stats at Basketball Reference

Geoffrey Michael Petrie (born April 17, 1948) is an American former professional basketball player. A native of Pennsylvania, he played professional basketball in the National Basketball Association (NBA) for the Portland Trail Blazers where he won NBA Rookie of the Year in 1971. After retirement as a player he entered management, and was the President of Basketball Operations for the Sacramento Kings in the NBA until June 2013.

== Early life ==
Geoff Petrie was born in Darby, Pennsylvania, on April 17, 1948. He attended Springfield High School, in Springfield, Pennsylvania, and played collegiate ball at Princeton University.

In Petrie's sophomore season at Princeton, the team was co-champion of the Ivy League with a 20–6 (12-3 Ivy) record. Despite the fact that Princeton had three of the five first-team All-Ivy team members, including Petrie plus second-team member John Hummer, they lost the one-game league playoff to the Jim McMillian–led 1968 Columbia Lions men's basketball team. That year, the team rose as high as eighth in the AP Poll. The following season, Petrie led the Ivy League in scoring (23.9 points/game in conference games), and the team accumulated a 19–7 (14–0) record, including an appearance in the 1969 NCAA Men's Division I Basketball Tournament. They lost to St. John's in the tournament, but Petrie was again on the first-team All-Ivy squad. As a senior, Petrie was second-team All-Ivy, but the Tigers placed third in the conference to the undefeated (in Ivy League games) Corky Calhoun-led Penn Quakers men's basketball team and McMillian's Lions. Although Princeton did not appear in the 1970 NCAA Men's Division I Basketball Tournament, they hosted Penn's game. All three of his varsity years were spent under head coach Pete Carril. Petrie was co-captain of the 1969–70 team with classmate Hummer. Petrie was All-East both as a junior and a senior.

Petrie scored 1,321 points in college, third in school history at the end of his career in 1970 and still seventh after the 2009–10 season. His 541 in 1968–69 was fourth, behind each of Bill Bradley's single-season totals, until Brian Taylor moved him down to sixth, where he still stands. Petrie continued to rank fourth in school history with an 18.3 points/game average through the 2009–10 season. His 1969–70 single season average of 22.3 is sixth, behind only Bradley and Taylor and his 20.8 average the prior year stands eighth. Petrie's 530 career field goal stands fourth on the school list behind Bradley, Kit Mueller and Craig Robinson. 216 field goals in 1968–69 ranks fifth behind Bradley and Taylor, while his 189 the following year ranks eighth. Seventeen made against Fordham, January 26, 1970, trails only Bradley's three best nights.

== Professional career ==
=== Player ===
At 6'4", Petrie could play either the guard or forward positions and was a long range shooter. He played in two All-Star games and in 1971, the Trail Blazers' first year in existence, was named co-Rookie of the Year with the Boston Celtics' Dave Cowens after averaging 24.8 points per game. The Associated Press reported Petrie's salary during his rookie season was approximately $80,000.

Until Damon Stoudamire's 54 point performance in 2005, Petrie held the Trail Blazers' individual scoring record for one game at 51 — a feat he accomplished twice. His jersey number, 45, was retired by the Trail Blazers. Following the 1975–76 NBA season, he was traded to the Atlanta Hawks in a transaction that landed Portland Maurice Lucas. Petrie did not play any games for the Hawks after suffering a career-ending knee injury.

Petrie is credited as the first NBA player to switch from Converse brand athletic shoes, which were popular in the 1970s, to Nike brand.. In 1973 Petrie won the 2nd NBA "One-On-One" contest,receiving $15,000 in prize money. He defeated Cleveland Cavaliers' forward Barry Clemens by a final score of 36 - 32.

=== Post-playing career ===
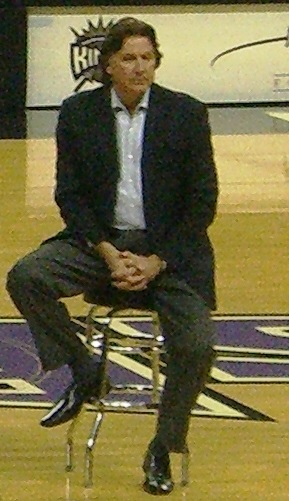
Petrie in 2009

Petrie worked in the private sector for several years after leaving the NBA, including as interim coach at Willamette University in Salem for the 1984 to 1985 season, and in 1985 began working for the Trail Blazers. He worked as a commentator for Blazer radio broadcasts and several other positions before being hired as senior vice president for operations. He left Portland in 1994 and was hired by the Sacramento Kings as president of basketball operations. As an executive he won the NBA Executive of the Year Award twice with the Kings, first in 1999 and again in 2001.

On December 29, 2009, Petrie received a three-year extension as team president through the 2012–13 season. On June 17, 2013, Petrie was replaced as team president of the Kings by Pete D'Alessandro.

== NBA career statistics ==
Legend
GP	Games played	GS	Games started	MPG	Minutes per game
FG%	Field goal percentage	3P%	3-point field goal percentage	FT%	Free throw percentage
RPG	Rebounds per game	APG	Assists per game	SPG	Steals per game
BPG	Blocks per game	PPG	Points per game	**Bold**	Career high

=== Regular season ===
Year	Team	GP	GS	MPG	FG%	3P%	FT%	RPG	APG	SPG	BPG	PPG
1970–71	Portland	**82**	–	37.0	.443	–	.722	3.4	4.8	–	–	24.8
1971–72	Portland	60	–	35.9	.417	–	.789	2.2	4.1	–	–	18.9
1972–73	Portland	79	–	**39.7**	.464	–	.778	**3.5**	4.4	–	–	**24.9**
1973–74	Portland	73	–	38.4	**.481**	–	**.853**	2.8	4.3	**1.2**	**0.2**	24.3
1974–75	Portland	80	–	38.9	.456	–	.839	2.6	**5.3**	1.0	**0.2**	18.3
1975–76	Portland	72	–	35.5	.461	–	.829	2.3	4.6	1.1	0.1	18.9
Career		446	–	37.6	.455	–	.805	2.8	4.6	1.1	0.1	21.8
All-Star		2	1	15.5	.214	–	1.000	1.0	2.5	0.5	0.0	4.0
