= Rolland Todd =

American former basketball player and coach

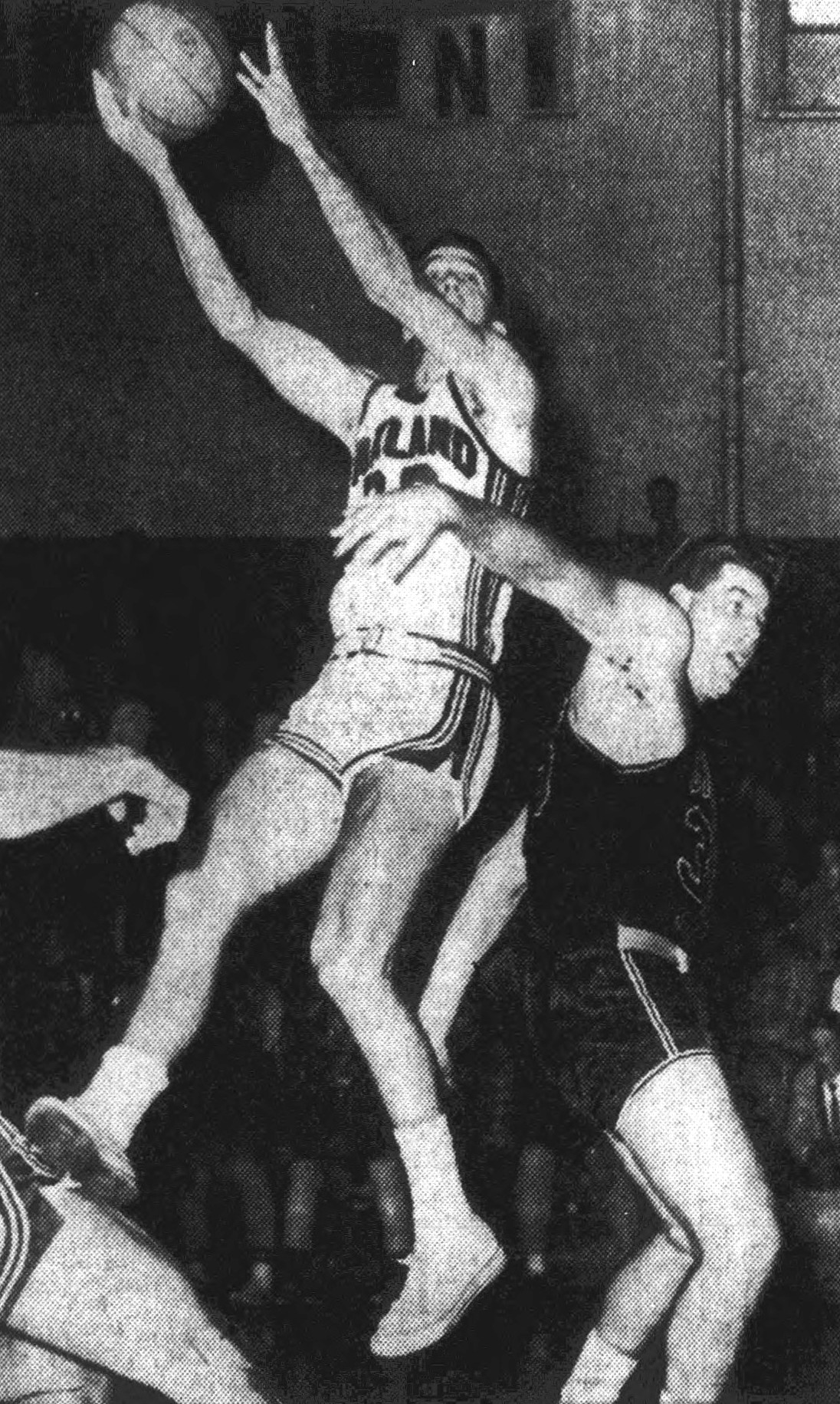
- Todd as a member of the Oakland Oaks in 1962.

Personal information
- Born: June 26, 1934 (age 92) Tulare County, California, U.S.
- Listed height: 6 ft 4 in (1.93 m)

Career information
- High school: Strathmore (Strathmore, California)
- College: College of the Sequoias (1952–1953); Fresno State (1956–1957)
- Playing career: 1958–1962
- Position: Guard
- Coaching career: 1964–1982

Career history

Playing
- 1958–1960: Buchan Bakers
- 1960: Akron Goodyear Wingfoots
- 1960–1962: San Francisco Saints / Oakland Oaks

Coaching
- 1964–1965: Cal State LA (assistant)
- 1965–1970: UNLV
- 1970–1972: Portland Trail Blazers
- 1975–1982: Santa Ana College

Rolland Douglas Todd (born April 26, 1934) is a former player and coach in the National Basketball Association, and a former player in the American Basketball League, who also coached basketball at University of Nevada, Las Vegas (UNLV). He was the first coach of the then-expansion Portland Trail Blazers, leading the team to a 29–53 record in its inaugural season (best of the three expansion clubs who entered the NBA that year); though was let go the next season when the team failed to improve. According to Sports Illustrated his nickname while coaching the Blazers was "Mod Todd".

== Early life ==
Todd grew up in Strathmore, California, the oldest of four children. He attended Fresno State College where he “was a star 6-4 guard at Fresno State in the mid-1950s, leading the Bulldogs to a 19-8 record and the California Collegiate Athletic Association championship as a senior in 1957-58.” His roommate and teammate for three years was Jerry Tarkanian. He attended graduate school at the University of Washington.

After graduating from Fresno State, Todd played for the Seattle, Washington based Buchan Bakers of the National Industrial Basketball League (NIBL) from 1958 to 1960. He briefly joined the Akron Goodyear Wingfoots in 1960 during their unsuccessful attempt to qualify as the team to represent the United States during the 1960 Summer Olympics.

Todd signed with the St. Louis Hawks of the National Basketball Association (NBA) in June 1960, but was placed on waivers before the start of the regular season. Todd reportedly signed with the Washington Tapers of the American Basketball League (ABL) in October 1961, but never joined the team and took a teaching job in Seattle, Washington. In December 1961, Todd signed with the San Francisco Saints of the ABL. On October 26, 1962, Todd signed with the Oakland Oaks of the ABL.

== Career statistics ==
Legend
GP	Games played	GS	Games started	MPG	Minutes per game
FG%	Field goal percentage	3P%	3-point field goal percentage	FT%	Free throw percentage
RPG	Rebounds per game	APG	Assists per game	SPG	Steals per game
BPG	Blocks per game	PPG	Points per game	**Bold**	Career high

Year	Team	GP	GS	MPG	FG%	3P%	FT%	RPG	APG	SPG	BPG	PPG
1960–61	San Francisco Saints	53	—	25.1	.380	.256	.752	4.1	3.7	—	—	8.2
1961–62	Oakland Oaks	24	—	30.5	.409	.292	.837	5.6	3.1	—	—	14.4
Career		77	—	26.8	.392	.270	.787	4.5	3.5	—	—	10.1

== Head coaching record ==
Team	Year	G	W	L	W–L%	Finish	PG	PW	PL	PW–L%	Result
Portland	1970–71	82	29	53	.354	5th in Pacific Division	—	—	—	—	Missed playoffs
Portland	1971–72	56	12	44	.214	left mid–season	—	—	—	—	—
Career		138	41	97	.297		0	0	0	–	
