= Brian Wheeler =

American sports radio announcer (1962–2024)

- Born: January 18, 1962
- Died: November 8, 2024 (aged 62)
- Education: Loyola University Chicago
- Presenting career
- Style: Sports radio, play-by-play
- Country: United States

Brian Wheeler (January 18, 1962 – November 8, 2024) was an American radio announcer and host best known for his 21-year career as the play-by-play radio announcer for the Portland Trail Blazers of the National Basketball Association from 1998 to 2019.

== Biography ==
=== Early years ===
Wheeler was adopted after his mother gave birth to him at age 17. He grew up in Southern California, where he was exposed at an early age to broadcasters such as Vin Scully and Chick Hearn. He had a difficult childhood which included the death of his adopted father at age 13 and a move to a dysfunctional and abusive household in Chicago.

Wheeler attended Loyola University in Chicago, where he earned a degree in Broadcasting and Communications.

=== Early broadcast career ===
Brian Wheeler began his radio career as a broadcaster for his alma mater, Loyola University Chicago, where he called play-by-play for soccer, softball, and basketball for station WLUW-FM.

Wheeler went on to work in a series of broadcasting jobs in Chicago, including time working for Northwestern University, the Chicago White Sox, and SportsChannel. He worked for the NBA's Chicago Bulls during their first championship season.

Wheeler moved from Chicago to Seattle, Washington, to take a job working for the Seattle SuperSonics, remaining there for two seasons, also hosting a radio talk show on the team's flagship radio station, KJR.

Wheeler later worked as a broadcaster for the WNBA team the Sacramento Monarchs, also hosting pre-game and post-game shows for the Sacramento Kings of the National Basketball Association.

He finished second in four searches for lead NBA play-by-play jobs before finally landing with the Trail Blazers.

=== Radio voice of the Portland Trail Blazers ===
In 1998, Wheeler came to Portland, Oregon to take a job as radio play-by-play announcer for the NBA's Portland Trail Blazers. Wheeler was placed in the difficult position of replacing broadcaster Bill Schonely, the franchise's first radio voice and a popular figure who coined the "Rip City" moniker.

Wheeler gradually carved out his own place as the voice of the franchise. He was often recognized among the NBA's top radio play-by-play announcers, earning the recognition of Marv Albert.

Wheeler was named Oregon's Sportscaster of the Year in 2007 by the National Sports Media Association.

In 2009, Wheeler and Schonely called a preseason game together in a game played at Veterans Memorial Coliseum in honor of the franchise's 40th anniversary. Schonely was scheduled to call just the third quarter before Wheeler quipped a line about not taking the ball away from a hot shooter and allowing Schonely to close out the game.

For a time, Wheeler hosted a daily radio talk show on KXTG-FM 95.5 The Game called Wheels at Work. In September 2010, Wheeler announced that he would step down from the radio show to spend more time working on the Blazers broadcast side of his life.

Wheeler missed most of the 2018–19 season due to health issues and was replaced by Travis Demers as the team's new radio voice in September 2019. He ended his run having called 1,823 Trail Blazers games.

During his Trail Blazers career, Wheeler worked alongside analysts Mike Rice (1998–2005), Antonio Harvey (2005–2016) and Michael Holton (2016–2019). Harvey made Wheeler the godparent of his youngest child.

He was a sports broadcasting course instructor for the online sports career training school Sports Management Worldwide in Portland.

== Style ==
Wheeler was known for his frenetic style and loud, passionate delivery. He had a number of unique catchphrases:

- "Boomshakalaka" — his most recognized catchphrase, typically used after a dunk.
- "And once again we can say, it's a great day to be a Blazer" — used following every Trail Blazers victory.
- Had several three-word alliterative adjective sets to describe the emotions of an opposing head coach who was forced to take a timeout due to a Trail Blazers' run. "Timeout San Antonio! And Gregg Popovich is mystified, mesmerized and mortified."
- "Bang! Kapow!" and "Ring it up!" — a made 3-pointer in a key moment.
- "Ooo that was nasty" — an especially good dunk.
- "They're dancing in the aisles here at the Rose Garden" — after a momentum swing at a home game.
- "My eyes don't deceive, so I have to believe"
- "He left [opponent] with his shoes untied"
- "Smile, [opponent]. You've been posterized"
- "It's as if the fire alarm has gone off here at Pepsi Center" — when Portland would put a game away on the road.
- "Hope you enjoyed the broadcast. Trust you enjoyed the outcome" — signing off after a Portland win.

Some of his most notable calls included:

- Brandon Roy's buzzer-beating overtime 3-pointer to defeat the Houston Rockets on November 6, 2008. "Hit it! Yes he did! Oh yeah! The Natural buries a 30-footer at the buzzer, and the Blazers run off the court a winner by two."
- Damian Lillard's buzzer-beating playoff 3-pointer to defeat the Houston Rockets and end a first-round playoff series on May 3, 2014. "Bang! You've got to pinch me, I must be dreaming."

== Personal life ==
Wheeler located his birth mother, Barbara Schneider, for the first time in 2012 in Rockford, Illinois. He also met his birth father and sister.

Wheeler struggled with his weight following the death of his adopted mother while in college. He turned to food for comfort and specifically developed unhealthy dietary habits when the condition of his household turned nearly unlivable. He weighed as much as 450 pounds. He used lap band surgery and other methods to drop 200 pounds in 2012.

=== Death ===
Wheeler died on November 8, 2024, at the age of 62 following a long illness.
