= Portland Trail Blazers =

National Basketball Association team in Portland, Oregon

- 2026–27 Portland Trail Blazers season
- Conference: Western
- Division: Northwest
- Founded: 1970; 56 years ago
- History: Portland Trail Blazers; 1970–present
- Arena: Moda Center
- Location: Portland, Oregon
- Team colors: Black, university red, white
- Main sponsor: Vacant
- President: Dewayne Hankins
- General manager: Joe Cronin
- Head coach: Micah Nori
- Ownership: Tom Dundon
- Affiliation: Rip City Remix
- Championships: 1 (1977)
- Conference titles: 3 (1977, 1990, 1992)
- Division titles: 6 (1978, 1991, 1992, 1999, 2015, 2018)
- Retired numbers: 12 (1, 13, 14, 15, 20, 22, 30, 30, 32, 36, 45, 77)
- Website: nba.com/blazers
Association	Icon

The Portland Trail Blazers (colloquially known as the Blazers) are an American professional basketball team based in Portland, Oregon. The Trail Blazers compete in the National Basketball Association (NBA) as a member of the Northwest Division of the Western Conference. The team played its home games in the Memorial Coliseum before moving to Moda Center in 1995 (called the Rose Garden until 2013). The franchise entered the league as an expansion team in 1970, and has enjoyed a strong following: from 1977 through 1995, the team sold out 814 consecutive home games, the longest such streak in American major professional sports at the time. Since the Seattle SuperSonics relocated to Oklahoma City in 2008, the Trail Blazers remain as the only NBA team based in the Pacific Northwest.

The team has advanced to the NBA Finals three times, winning the NBA championship once in 1977. Their other NBA Finals appearances were in 1990 and 1992. The team has qualified for the playoffs in 37 seasons of their 55-season existence (through the 2024–25 season), including a streak of 21 straight appearances from 1983 through 2003, tied for the second longest streak in NBA history. The Trail Blazers' 37 playoff appearances rank fourth in the NBA only behind the Los Angeles Lakers, Boston Celtics and San Antonio Spurs since the team's inception in 1970. Six Hall of Fame players have played for the Trail Blazers (Lenny Wilkens, Bill Walton, Clyde Drexler, Dražen Petrović, Arvydas Sabonis, and Scottie Pippen). Bill Walton is the franchise's most decorated player; he was the NBA Finals Most Valuable Player in 1977, and the regular season MVP the following year. Four Blazers' rookies (Geoff Petrie, Sidney Wicks, Brandon Roy and Damian Lillard) have won the NBA Rookie of the Year award. Three players have earned the Most Improved Player award: Kevin Duckworth (1988), Zach Randolph (2004), and CJ McCollum (2016). Three Hall of Fame coaches – Lenny Wilkens, Jack Ramsay, and Rick Adelman – have patrolled the sidelines for the Blazers, and two others, Mike Schuler and Mike Dunleavy, have won the NBA Coach of the Year Award with the team.

== History ==
=== 1970–1974: Franchise inception ===
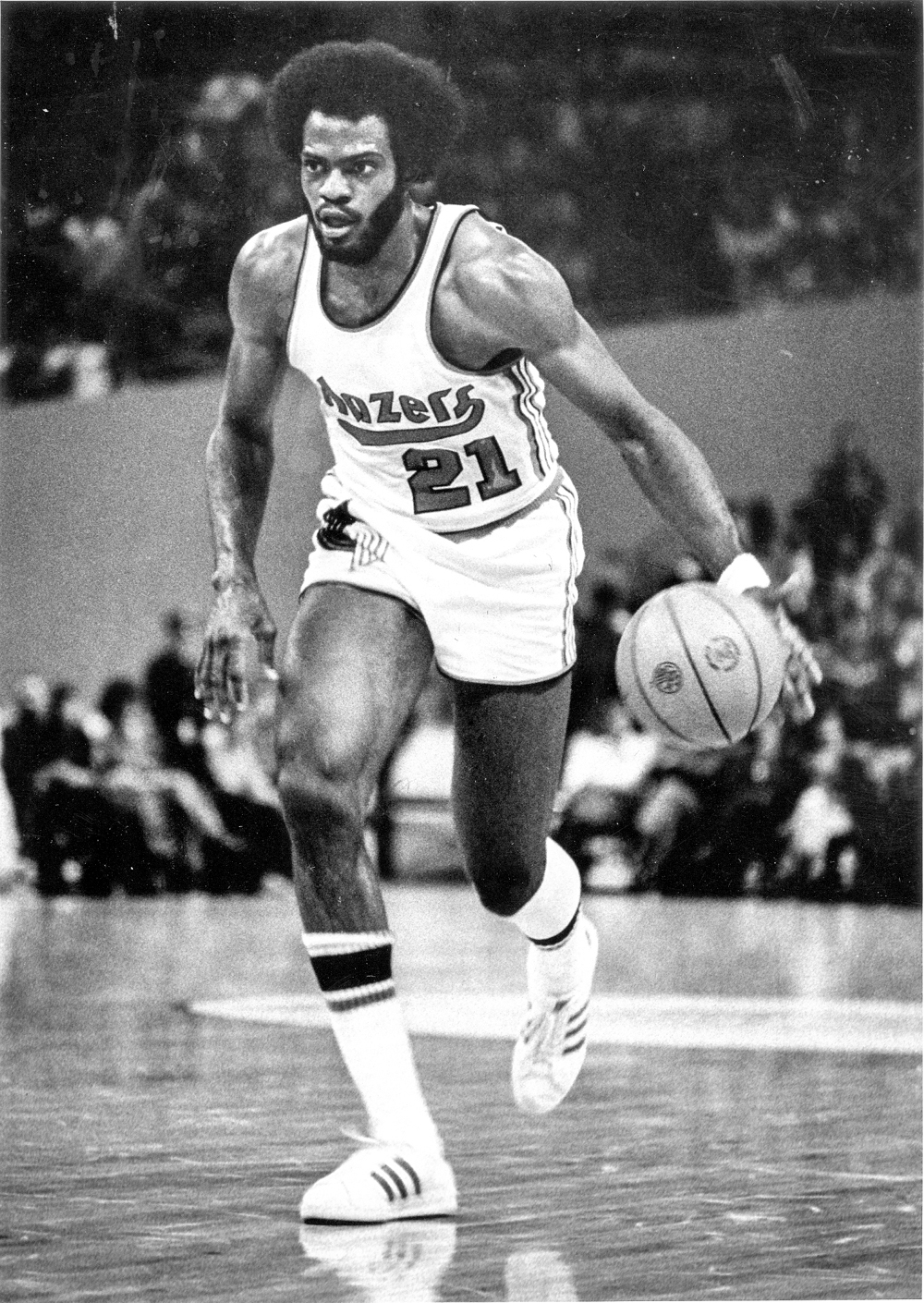
Sidney Wicks, who played in four NBA All-Star Games while with the Trail Blazers, won the 1971–72 NBA Rookie of the Year Award after averaging 24.5 points per game and 11.5 rebounds per game.

Sports promoter and Trail Blazers founder Harry Glickman sought a National Basketball Association (NBA) franchise for Portland as far back as 1955 when he proposed two new expansion teams, the other to be located in Los Angeles. When the Memorial Coliseum was opened in 1960 Glickman saw the potential it could serve as a professional basketball venue but it was not until February 6, 1970, that the NBA board of governors granted him the rights to a franchise in Portland. To raise the money for the $3.7 million admission tax, Glickman associated himself to real estate magnates Robert Schmertz of New Jersey, Larry Weinberg of Los Angeles and Herman Sarkowsky of Seattle. Two weeks later, on February 24, team management held a contest to select the team's name and received more than 10,000 entries. The most popular choice was "Pioneers", but that name was excluded from consideration as it was already used by sports teams at Portland's Lewis & Clark College. The name "Trail Blazers" received 172 entries, and was ultimately selected by the judging panel, being revealed on March 13 in the halftime of a SuperSonics game at the Memorial Coliseum. Derived from the trail blazing activity by explorers making paths through forests, Glickman considered it a name that could "reflect both the ruggedness of the Pacific Northwest and the start of a major league era in our state". Despite initial mixed response, the Trail Blazers name, often shortened to just "Blazers", became popular in Oregon. While not directly connected, the Portland Trail Blazers do bear the namesake of the Salem Trailblazers who played in the Pacific Coast Professional Basketball League (PCPBL).

Along with the Cleveland Cavaliers and Buffalo Braves (now Los Angeles Clippers), the Trail Blazers entered the NBA in 1970 as an expansion team, under coach Rolland Todd. Geoff Petrie and Sidney Wicks led the team in its early years, and the team failed to qualify for the playoffs in its first six seasons of existence. During that span, the team had three head coaches (including future hall-of-famer Lenny Wilkens); team executive Stu Inman also served as coach. The team won the first pick in the NBA draft twice during that span. In 1972, the team drafted LaRue Martin with the number one pick.

=== 1974–1979: Bill Walton era ===
In 1974 the team selected number one pick Bill Walton from UCLA. The ABA–NBA merger of 1976 saw those two rival leagues join forces. Four ABA teams joined the NBA; the remaining teams were dissolved and their players distributed among the remaining NBA squads in a dispersal draft. The Trail Blazers selected Maurice Lucas in the dispersal draft. That summer, they also hired Jack Ramsay as head coach.

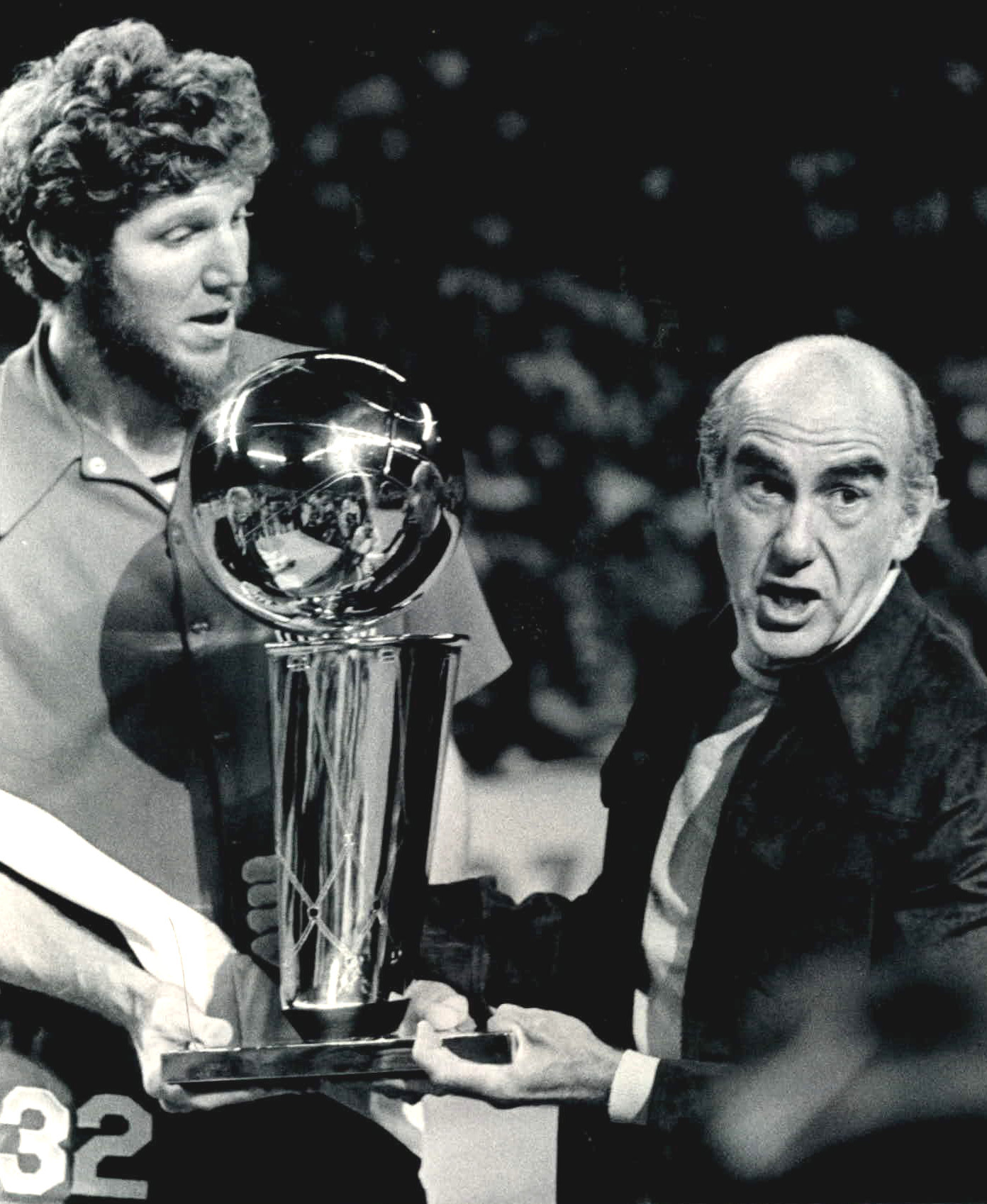
In his first season as the Trail Blazers head coach, Jack Ramsay led the team to their first playoff berth and eventually the championship. Bill Walton was the NBA Finals MVP.

The two moves, coupled with the team's stellar play, led Portland to several franchise firsts: winning record (49–33), playoff appearance, and an NBA championship in 1977. Starting on April 5 of that year, the team began a sellout streak of 814 straight games—the longest in American major professional sports history—which did not end until 1995, after the team moved into a larger facility.

The team started the 1977–78 season with a 50–10 mark, and some predicted a dynasty in Portland. However, Bill Walton suffered a foot injury that ended his season and would plague him over the remainder of his career, and the team struggled to an 8–14 finish, going 58–24 overall. In the playoffs, Portland lost to the Seattle SuperSonics in the 1978 conference semifinals. That summer, Walton demanded to be traded to a team of his choice (Clippers, Knicks, Warriors, or 76ers), because he was unhappy with his medical treatment in Portland. Walton was never traded, and he held out the entire 1978–79 season and left the team as a free agent thereafter. The team was further dismantled as Lucas left in 1980.

=== 1980–1983: Transitioning ===
During the 1980s, the team was a consistent presence in the NBA postseason, failing to qualify for the playoffs only in 1982. However, they never advanced past the conference semifinals during the decade. The Pacific Division of the NBA was dominated by the Los Angeles Lakers throughout the decade, and only the Lakers and the Houston Rockets represented the Western Conference in the NBA Finals. Key players for the Blazers during the early 1980s included Mychal Thompson, Billy Ray Bates, Fat Lever, Darnell Valentine, Wayne Cooper, T. R. Dunn, Jim Paxson, and Calvin Natt.

=== 1983–1995: The Clyde Drexler era ===
==== Drafting Clyde Drexler ====
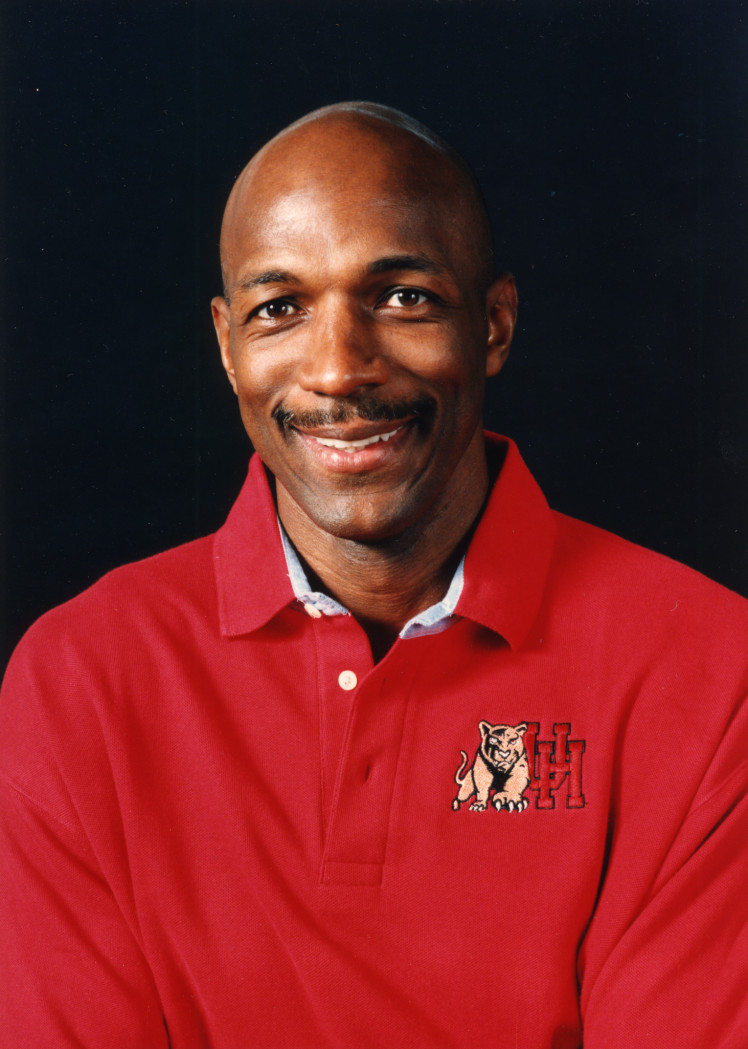
Clyde Drexler played in Portland from 1983 to 1995.

In the 1983 draft, the team selected University of Houston guard–forward Clyde Drexler with the 14th pick; "Clyde the Glide" would become the face of the franchise for over a decade, and the team's second-most decorated player (after Walton). In the next year's draft, the Trail Blazers landed the No. 2 pick in the NBA draft. After the Houston Rockets selected Drexler's college teammate Hakeem Olajuwon at No. 1, the Trail Blazers selected Kentucky center Sam Bowie. Drafting third, the Chicago Bulls selected Michael Jordan. The selection of the injury-plagued Bowie over Jordan has been criticized as one of the worst draft picks in the history of American professional sports. That summer, the Blazers also made a controversial trade, sending Lever, Cooper, and Natt to the Denver Nuggets for high-scoring forward Kiki Vandeweghe. In the 1985 draft, the Blazers selected point guard Terry Porter with the last pick of the first round. Porter would go on to become one of the top point guards in the league, and the Blazers' all-time leader in assists.

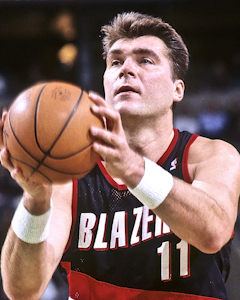
After being drafted by the Trail Blazers several years prior, Arvydas Sabonis made his NBA debut during the 1995–96 season.

However, the Blazers continued to struggle in the postseason, and in 1986, Ramsay was fired and replaced with Mike Schuler. Despite this, they were the only team to beat the Boston Celtics on the road that season. That following off-season, the team drafted two players from behind the Iron Curtain, Arvydas Sabonis and Dražen Petrović, and sent Thompson to the San Antonio Spurs for former Oregon State University star Steve Johnson. Johnson was a high-scoring forward-center who the team intended to pair with Bowie on the frontline. It was not to be, as Bowie broke his leg five games into the 1986–87 season, missing the next two and a half seasons. During Schuler's brief tenure, the Blazers failed to advance out of the first round of the NBA playoffs.

==== Paul Allen ownership ====
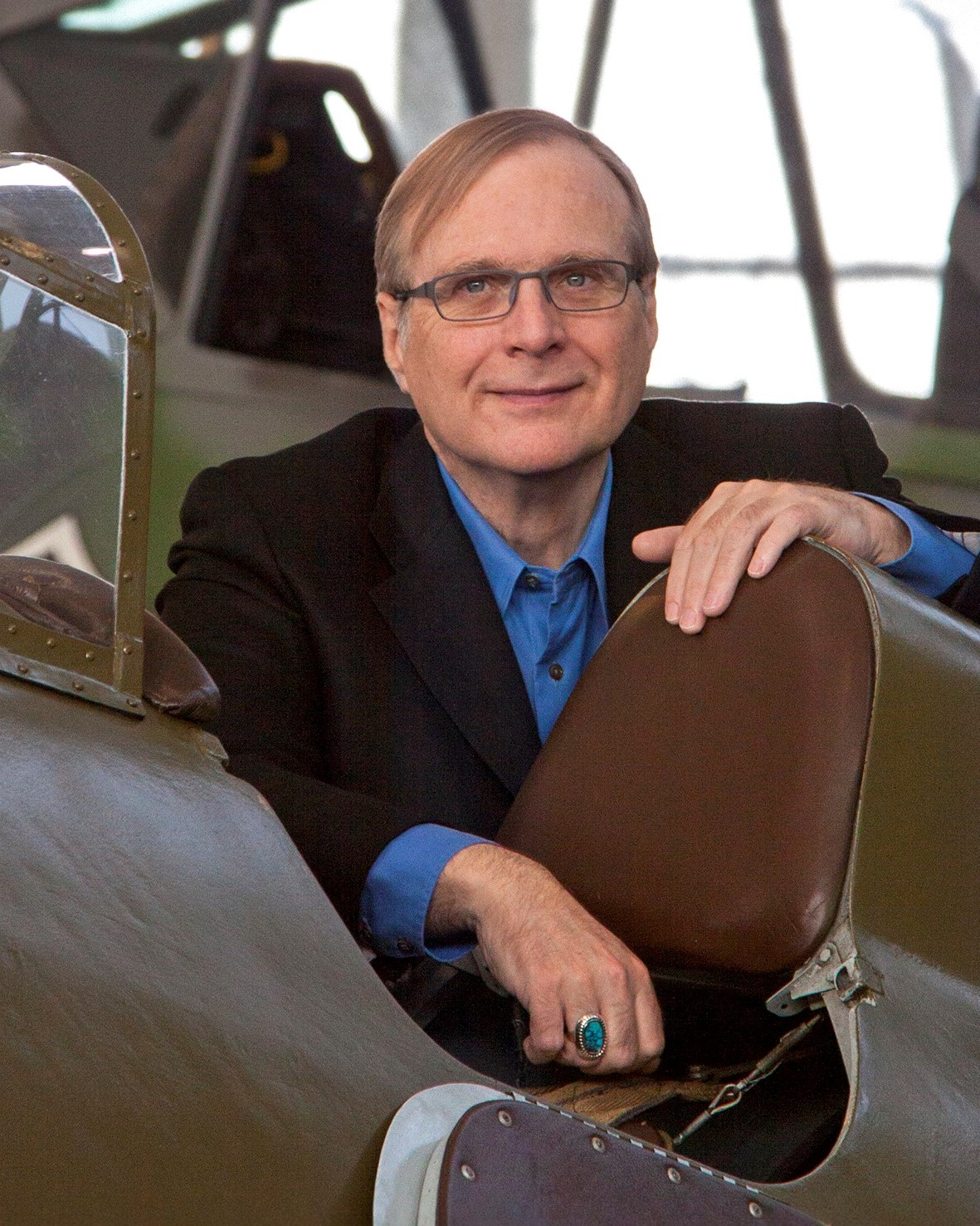
In 1988, Microsoft co-founder and Vulcan Inc. chairman Paul Allen purchased the Trail Blazers.

In 1988, Microsoft co-founder Paul Allen purchased the Blazers for $70 million. At the time of the purchase, Allen, then 35, became the youngest team owner in the Big Four professional sports. His first season as owner was one marked by turmoil, as conflicts erupted over who should start at several positions. Both Vandeweghe and Johnson suffered injuries; they were replaced in the starting lineup by Jerome Kersey and Kevin Duckworth. Several players, most notably Drexler, were accused of undermining Schuler. The team went 25–22 to open the 1988–89 season, and Schuler was fired. He was replaced on an interim basis with assistant coach Rick Adelman, and Vandeweghe was traded to the New York Knicks. Under Adelman, the team went 14–21 to finish the season, and barely qualified for the playoffs. That off-season, the team traded Sam Bowie (who had returned to the team to end the season) to the New Jersey Nets for forward Buck Williams, and Adelman was given the coaching job on a non-interim basis.

==== Reaching the NBA Finals ====
The addition of Williams, and the replacement of the defensively challenged Vandeweghe with the defensive-minded Kersey, turned the team from a poor defensive squad into a good one. Led by Drexler, the team reached the NBA Finals in 1990 and 1992, losing to the Detroit Pistons and Chicago Bulls. Possibly inspired by the 1985 Chicago Bears' "Super Bowl Shuffle", during the run-up to their 1990 Finals appearance, the Blazers recorded two songs: "Bust a Bucket" and "Rip City Rhapsody" (with music played and recorded by Josh Mellicker, "Rip City" being a reference to the city's nickname). The year in between their two finals appearances, the team posted a league-best 63–19 record before losing to the Los Angeles Lakers in the Western Conference finals, including a heartbreaker in game 6 where, in the final seconds, Cliff Robinson dropped a pass while standing directly under the basket, and then, with a few seconds left, Terry Porter's desperation wide-open 20-footer bounced out. However, the team failed to win an NBA title, and failed to advance past the first round in 1993 and 1994. Adelman was fired after the 1994 season, and replaced with P. J. Carlesimo, which led to the resignation of executive vice-president Geoff Petrie, a close friend of Adelman's.

In July 1994, the Trail Blazers announced the hiring of a new team president, former Seattle SuperSonics general manager Bob Whitsitt. Whitsitt, known as "Trader Bob" for his penchant for engaging player-exchange transactions, immediately set about revamping the Blazers roster; this included dismantling the aging Drexler-led team that had twice been to the finals. Drexler requested to be traded to a contender, and the Trail Blazers traded him to the Houston Rockets. In the fall of 1995, the team left the Memorial Coliseum for a new home, the 20,000-seat Rose Garden Arena. The sellout streak ended in the new building.

=== 1995–2006: Rebuilding and troubles ===
Several players left in free agency, including Terry Porter (1995), Buck Williams (1996), and Clifford Robinson (1997). Meanwhile, Trail Blazer management decided to leave Jerome Kersey unprotected in the 1995 expansion draft.

In an effort to quickly rebuild the team's roster, they acquired several players who were highly talented but had negative reputations for off-court troubles. Isaiah Rider was traded to the team by the Minnesota Timberwolves for a draft pick, and was considered to be a problematic player due to his previous arrests for assault, gambling and marijuana possession. He was arrested for marijuana possession just two days before his expected debut with the Blazers. Rasheed Wallace, who had garnered a reputation as a hot-tempered player since college, was also acquired in a trade with the Washington Bullets. Point guard Kenny Anderson was signed as a free agent, and subsequently traded to the Toronto Raptors for Damon Stoudamire in February 1998; the Raptors traded Anderson to the Boston Celtics five days later, because he did not want to play in Canada for the 3 year old franchise. The team found success and eventually returned to the Western Conference finals in 1999 under head coach Mike Dunleavy. They beat the Phoenix Suns in the first round, sweeping them 3–0, marking the first time the Blazers had advanced past the first round since 1992. In the semi-finals, they defeated the two-time defending Western Conference champions Utah Jazz with a 4–2 series win. In the Western Conference Finals, they faced the San Antonio Spurs, led by Tim Duncan, and were subsequently defeated in a 4–0 sweep.

After the failed championship run, Whitsitt sent Rider, who was the leading scorer that season with 13.9 points per game, and guard Jim Jackson to the Atlanta Hawks for guard Steve Smith. In one of their biggest acquisitions yet, the team added six-time champion and seven-time All-Star Scottie Pippen from the Houston Rockets. In the 1999–2000 season, the team advanced to the Western Conference finals, where they beat the Minnesota Timberwolves 3–1 in the opening round and the Utah Jazz 4–1 in the semifinals. They advanced to the conference finals where they faced a Los Angeles Lakers team led by Shaquille O'Neal and Kobe Bryant. In that series, the Trail Blazers lost 3 of the first 4 games but came back to win games 5 and 6, forcing a game 7. The Blazers had a 15-point lead at the start of the fourth quarter, but eventually lost their lead when the Lakers had a 25–4 run. The Trail Blazers lost game 7, 89–84 and the Lakers won the championship.

==== "The Jail Blazers" ====
One of the most infamous periods in Trail Blazers history is the era of the "Jail Blazers." Though the team had experienced its fair share of controversy and issues in prior seasons, many consider the "Jail Blazers" saga starting during the 2000–2001 season. The team made a series of personnel moves in the 2000 and 2001 off-seasons that failed to produce success. Forward Jermaine O'Neal was traded to the Indiana Pacers for Dale Davis. Brian Grant signed with the Miami Heat, and was replaced with ex-Seattle forward Shawn Kemp. The team started off well and had a 12-game winning streak in February and March in the regular season. The team signed guard Rod Strickland mid-season to augment their point guard corps. The team finished as 6th seed in the Western Conference with a 49–33 record, which qualified them for the playoff finals for the 20th consecutive year. They were eliminated in the first round, losing 0–3 to the Los Angeles Lakers. Rasheed Wallace set the NBA record with 41 technical fouls, breaking his own record of 38 the year before. New rules in 2006, inspired by Wallace, now give suspensions starting with a player's 16th technical foul. This made Wallace's NBA record effectively unbreakable.

Some media outlets began to criticize the team, and questioned Whitsitt's decisions and position as manager. A popular criticism was that Whitsitt was attempting to win a championship title by assembling a roster of stars, without paying attention to team chemistry. Longtime NBA coach and analyst, Doug Collins, referred to Whitsitt as a "rotisserie-league manager". Fans were publicly disapproving of Whitsitt; one fan even attending a game with a banner reading "Trade Whitsitt" that they displayed in the crowd before eventually getting ejected from the venue. Tensions continued to rise within the franchise and media outlets started reporting on the team's internal personnel issues and the criminal activity that players were involved in. Mainstream media began referring to the team as "The Jail Blazers" because of all these problems.

That off-season, Dunleavy was fired and replaced with Maurice Cheeks, who was considered a "players' coach" because he was a former player in the NBA. The hiring of Cheeks was thought to be a positive decision as many believed he would relate more to the players than Dunleavy did. Cheeks brought on Dan Panaggio as assistant coach after a failed courtship with Henry Bibby of Southern California. More transactions followed as the Blazers traded Steve Smith to the Spurs for Derek Anderson, but issues began when Shawn Kemp checked himself into a rehab for cocaine use in April 2001. That same season, Whitsitt made one of his most controversial moves in signing free agent Ruben Patterson, who had previously pleaded no contest to a felony sexual assault charge and was required to register as a sex offender. In 2002, police responded to a security alarm alert at Damon Stoudamire's house, though no intruders were there. After smelling marijuana in the home, they searched the premises and found a pound of cannabis located in a crawlspace; the search was later declared illegal and all charges were dropped. In 2003, several of the players, including Wallace, Stoudamire, and Qyntel Woods, were cited for marijuana possession. That same year, Wallace was suspended for seven games for threatening a referee – one of many incidents in his tumultuous relationship with NBA referees, which at the time stemmed from his belief that some of the referees were fixing the games against him and his teammates. Also during the 2003 season, Zach Randolph and Patterson got into an altercation in the locker room in which Patterson slammed Randolph onto the floor, an incident that later became known as the NBA's "The Slam Heard Around The World." The feud between players continued and they later got in a fight during practice, with Randolph sucker punching his teammate and fracturing Patterson's left eye socket, an injury which took Patterson out of their playoff run. Guard Bonzi Wells famously told Sports Illustrated in a 2002 interview: "We're not really going to worry about what the hell (the fans) think about us. They really don't matter to us. They can boo us everyday, but they're still going to ask for our autographs if they see us on the street. That's why they're fans, and we're NBA players." Wells was fined $50,000 by the Blazers for the statement. Later in 2005, Woods pleaded guilty to first-degree animal abuse for staging dog fights in his house, some involving his pit bull named Hollywood. Woods' dogs were confiscated, and Woods was given eighty hours of community service. He also agreed to donate $10,000 to the Oregon Humane Society.

In the summer of 2003, attendance to games was steadily declining alongside the team's reputation. With an exorbitant payroll, Whitsitt announced that he would leave the team to focus on Paul Allen's other franchise, the Seattle Seahawks.

To replace Whitsitt, the team hired two men at new positions. John Nash, a veteran NBA executive, was hired as general manager, and Steve Patterson as team president. The new management promised a focus on character while remaining playoff contenders; the team soon published a "25-Point Pledge" to fans. Troublesome players including Wells, Wallace, and Jeff McInnis were traded. However, the team failed to qualify for the 2004 NBA playoffs, ending a streak of 21 consecutive playoff appearances.

The following year in 2005, the team plummeted to a 27–55 record. The bankruptcy of the Oregon Arena corporation resulted in the Rose Garden becoming owned by a variety of investment firms. Cheeks was fired that season and replaced on an interim basis by director of player-personnel Kevin Pritchard. That summer the team hired Nate McMillan, who had coached the Sonics the prior season, as head coach and Pritchard returned to the front office.

In the 2005–06 season, the Blazers posted a historic 21–61 record, the worst league record at the time. Attendance to games decreased, and the year was not free of player incidents. Players such as Miles, Patterson, Randolph, and Sebastian Telfair were involved in either on-court bickering or off-court legal incidents. Nash was fired at the end of the season, with Steve Patterson assuming the general manager role in addition to his duties as president. In addition, the team had a poor relationship with the management of the Rose Garden, frequently complaining of a "broken economic model". It was widely speculated by the end of the year that Paul Allen would sell the team, and the team was offered for sale that summer, with several groups expressing interest. However, Allen was willing to spend money and urged Pritchard to make draft-day trades. He subsequently took the team off the market.

=== 2006–2012: With Roy, Oden and Aldridge ===
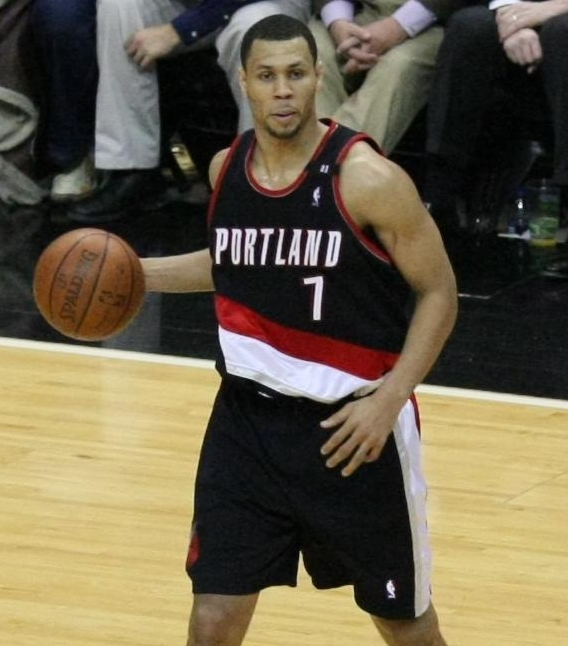
Brandon Roy was chosen as the NBA Rookie of the Year after the 2006–07 season.

In the 2006 NBA draft, the Blazers traded Viktor Khryapa and the draft rights for Tyrus Thomas to acquire LaMarcus Aldridge. They also traded for the sixth pick, which became Brandon Roy. In the spring of 2007, Steve Patterson resigned as team president, and Paul Allen repurchased the Rose Garden. On the court, the team finished with a 32–50 record, an 11-game improvement, and Roy was named the 2006–07 Rookie of the Year. That summer, Kevin Pritchard was promoted to general manager, and former Nike executive Larry Miller was hired as team president. The Blazers won the 2007 NBA draft lottery and selected Ohio State center Greg Oden with the No. 1 pick. Some speculated they might choose Kevin Durant instead; Durant was picked at No. 2 by the Seattle SuperSonics. Oden suffered a pre-season knee injury requiring microfracture surgery and missed the entire 2007–08 season. Oden's injury woes and Durant's success drew comparisons to the Blazers' selection of Sam Bowie over Michael Jordan in 1984.

Despite this, the Trail Blazers had a 13-game winning streak starting in early December, resulting in an NBA-best 13–2 record for the month. Nate McMillan won NBA Coach of the Month, and Roy earned NBA Western Conference Player of the Week honors in back-to-back weeks—the first Blazer to do so since Clyde Drexler in 1990–91. Roy was selected to the 2008 NBA All-Star Game, the first Blazer All-Star since Rasheed Wallace in 2001. The Blazers finished the season 41–41, their best record since 2003–04. Following the season, they became the only NBA team in the Pacific Northwest after the Seattle SuperSonics moved to Oklahoma City.

During the 2008–09 season, Greg Oden finally debuted, playing in 61 games. Portland also added international talent with Spanish swingman Rudy Fernández and French-native Nicolas Batum, who emerged as a skilled defensive forward. Roy made his second straight All-Star Game appearance, and Fernández competed in the Sprite Slam Dunk Contest during All-Star Weekend. Roy had a career-high 52 points against the Phoenix Suns and hit game-winning shots against the Houston Rockets and New York Knicks. The Blazers clinched their first playoff berth since 2003 with a 54–28 record, their best since 2002–03, but lost in the first round to the Houston Rockets in six games.

In the 2009 off-season, the Blazers traded the No. 24 pick to Dallas for the No. 22 pick and selected Víctor Claver. They also picked Villanova forward Dante Cunningham, Jon Brockman, and guard Patrick Mills. Brockman was traded to the Kings for No. 31 pick Jeff Pendergraph. Free agent Channing Frye signed with Phoenix, and Sergio Rodríguez was traded to the Kings. The Blazers attempted to sign free agents Hedo Türkoğlu and Paul Millsap, but Türkoğlu signed with Toronto, and Utah matched the offer for Millsap. On July 24, the Blazers signed point guard Andre Miller.

Despite a winning record, the 2009–10 season was marred by injuries. Reserves Batum and Fernández started on the inactive list, and forward Travis Outlaw followed with a serious foot injury. Centers Oden and Joel Przybilla suffered season-ending knee injuries, while Roy and Aldridge played through various injuries. Head Coach Nate McMillan also ruptured his Achilles tendon during practice. To fill the void at center, the Blazers acquired Marcus Camby from the Clippers for Steve Blake and Outlaw. Despite these challenges, the Blazers finished 50–32, securing the 6th seed in the West. Roy underwent surgery for a torn meniscus but returned for Game 4 of the first-round series against the Phoenix Suns. However, the Blazers lost the series 4–2 to the Suns.

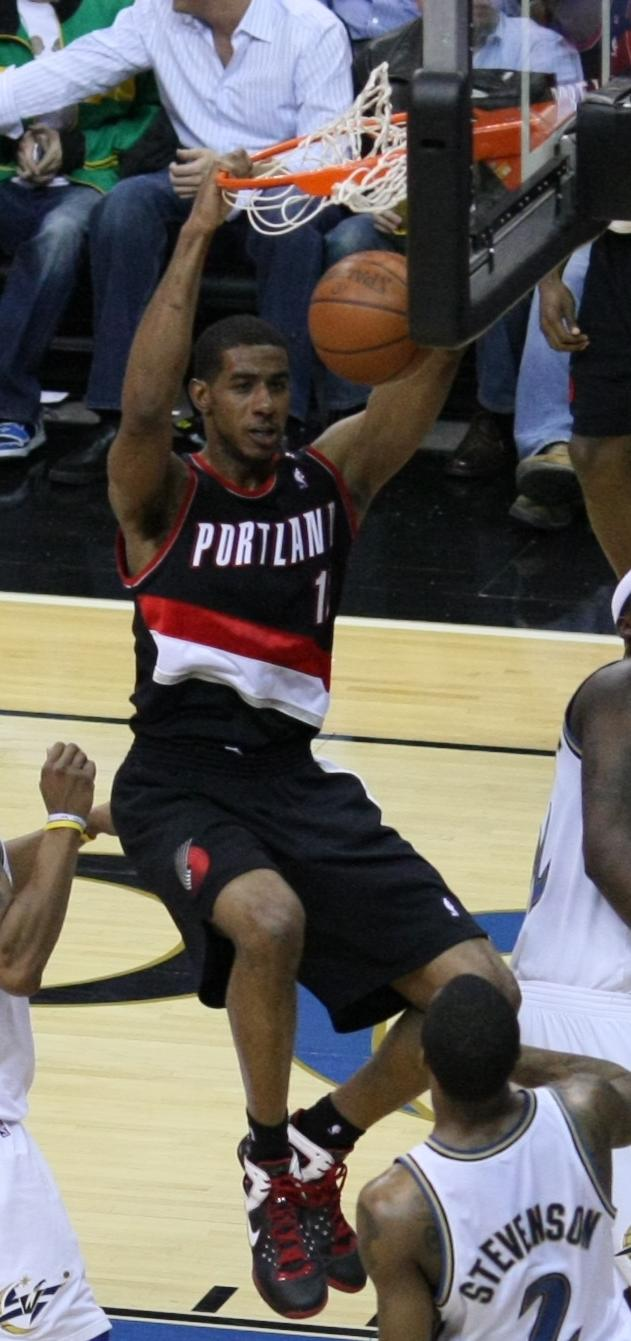
LaMarcus Aldridge played the first nine years of his pro career in Portland.

During the 2010 off-season, the Blazers' front office saw significant changes with Rich Cho becoming the new general manager, succeeding Kevin Pritchard. Cho became the first Asian-American GM in NBA history. On August 12, the Blazers signed two new assistant general managers, Bill Branch and Steve Rosenberry, replacing Tom Penn, who was released in March. The organization also made changes to McMillan's coaching staff, hiring Bernie Bickerstaff, Bob Ociepka, and Buck Williams.

Similar to the previous season, the 2010–11 season was plagued by injuries. Jeff Pendergraph and rookie guard Elliot Williams suffered knee injuries, sidelining them for the season. In November, Oden underwent microfracture surgery on his left knee, ending his season. Brandon Roy also underwent double arthroscopic surgery on January 17, 2011, to repair both knees, casting doubt on his future. Days later, Marcus Camby had arthroscopic knee surgery.

Despite the injuries, the Blazers remained competitive, with LaMarcus Aldridge emerging as the focal point of the team. Wesley Matthews also proved his worth in Roy's absence. Believing the team could make a playoff run, Cho made a trade on February 24, 2011, sending Dante Cunningham, Joel Przybilla, and Sean Marks to the Charlotte Bobcats for former All-Star Gerald Wallace. The Blazers won 48 games, securing another playoff berth but were eliminated in the first round by the eventual champion Dallas Mavericks in six games.

In the 2011 off-season, the Blazers released Cho, reportedly due to communication and "chemistry issues" with owner Paul Allen. Chad Buchanan took over as interim GM. Cho's dismissal was criticized as "illogical" by Sports Illustrated, though they noted that Allen had made many questionable moves during his tenure as owner.

On June 23, 2011, in the NBA draft, the Blazers selected guards Nolan Smith from Duke with the 21st pick and Jon Diebler from Ohio State with the 51st pick. On the same day, the Blazers made a three-team trade with the Denver Nuggets and Dallas Mavericks, sending Andre Miller to Denver and Rudy Fernández to Dallas, and acquiring Raymond Felton from Denver.

The 2011 NBA lockout halted transactions until early December, when the Blazers faced several setbacks: Brandon Roy announced his retirement due to chronic knee problems, Greg Oden had yet another knee setback, and LaMarcus Aldridge underwent heart surgery. Interim GM Chad Buchanan signed three free agents: Kurt Thomas, Jamal Crawford, and Craig Smith.

In the shortened 2011–12 season, the Blazers started 7–2 but quickly collapsed as starting point guard Raymond Felton and others struggled with McMillan's new running-style offense. Despite Aldridge making his first All-Star Game, the team remained inconsistent.

On March 15, 2012, the Blazers made several moves, trading Marcus Camby to Houston and Gerald Wallace to New Jersey for expiring contracts and draft picks. They also released Greg Oden and fired head coach Nate McMillan, naming Kaleb Canales as interim head coach. The team finished with a 28–38 record and missed the playoffs for the first time in three years.

At the 2012 NBA draft lottery on May 30, the Blazers secured the number 6 pick via the Brooklyn Nets and the number 11 pick due to their own record. Neil Olshey became the new GM in June, ending over a year of interim management.

=== 2012–2023: The Damian Lillard era ===
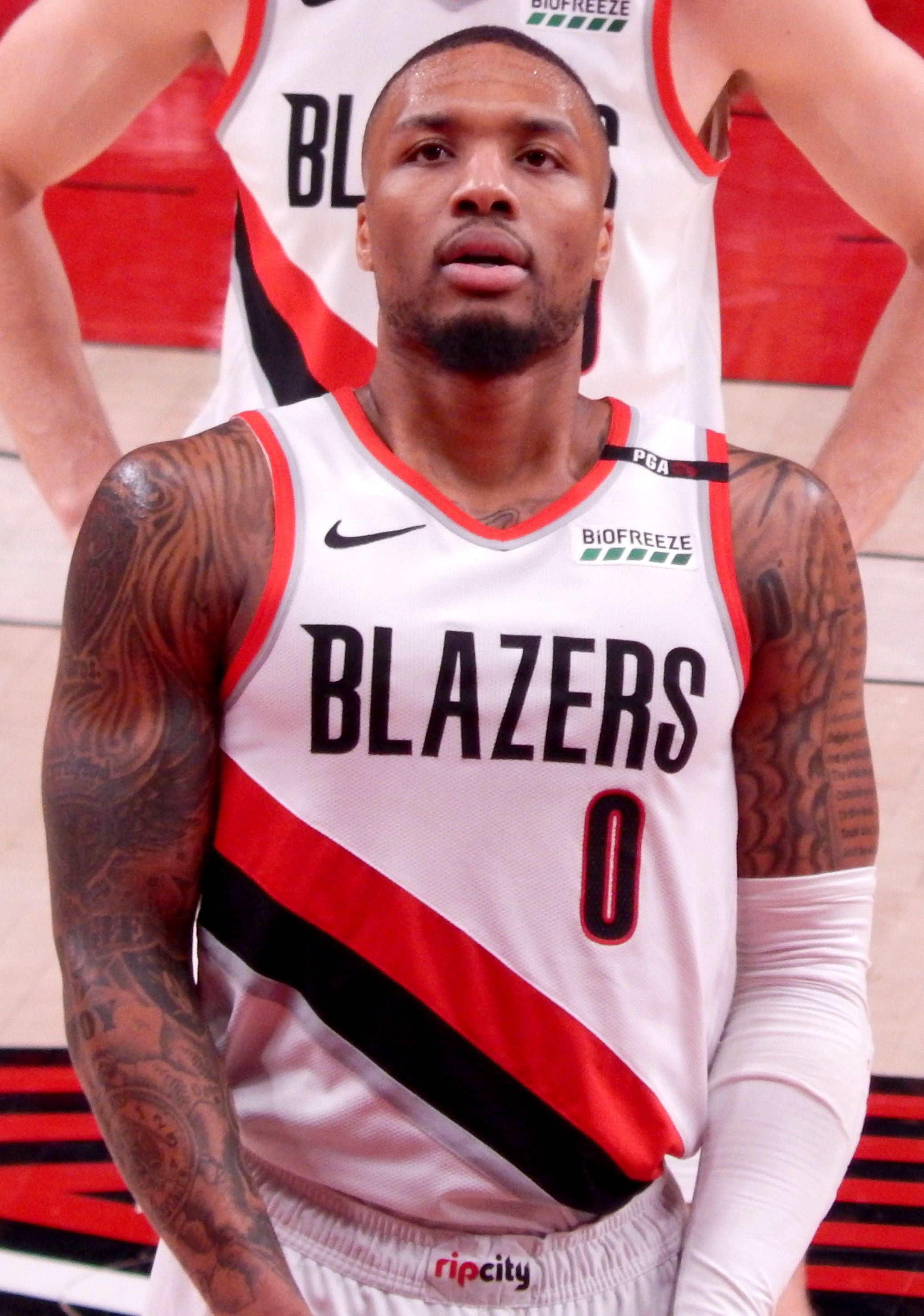
Damian Lillard is a seven-time NBA All-Star (2014, 2015, 2018, 2019, 2020, 2021, 2023) and was the unanimous choice for the NBA Rookie of the Year following the 2012–13 season.

On June 28, 2012, the Blazers selected Weber State guard Damian Lillard and University of Illinois center Meyers Leonard with the 6th and 11th picks overall, respectively. They also selected University of Memphis guard Will Barton with the 40th pick overall, and traded the rights of the 41st overall pick, University of Kansas guard Tyshawn Taylor, to the Brooklyn Nets for cash considerations.

Headed by their new general manager Olshey, the Trail Blazers front office further made a few changes during July 2012. The Blazers signed their 30th pick from the 2006 draft, Joel Freeland, and their 22nd pick from the 2009 draft, Víctor Claver, as well as re-signing Hickson and Nicolas Batum. They also signed veteran point guard Ronnie Price to back up Lillard, who was selected as co-MVP of the 2012 Las Vegas Summer League. Dallas Mavericks assistant coach Terry Stotts was hired as head coach on August 7, 2012.

Under the reins of Lillard, the Blazers played well into January 2013, posting a 20–15 record. On January 11, 2013, at home against the Miami Heat, Wesley Matthews made two consecutive three-pointers late in the fourth quarter to help the Blazers secure a 92–90 victory. However, despite the Blazers remaining among the playoff contenders for most of the season, injuries to starters Batum, LaMarcus Aldridge, and Matthews, as well as a losing streak of 13 games – the longest in the franchise's history – led to the 11th position in the West, with a 33–49 record. Averaging 19.0 points, 6.5 assists, and 3.1 rebounds, Lillard was unanimously named Rookie of the Year, joining Ralph Sampson, David Robinson, and Blake Griffin as the only unanimous selections in NBA history.

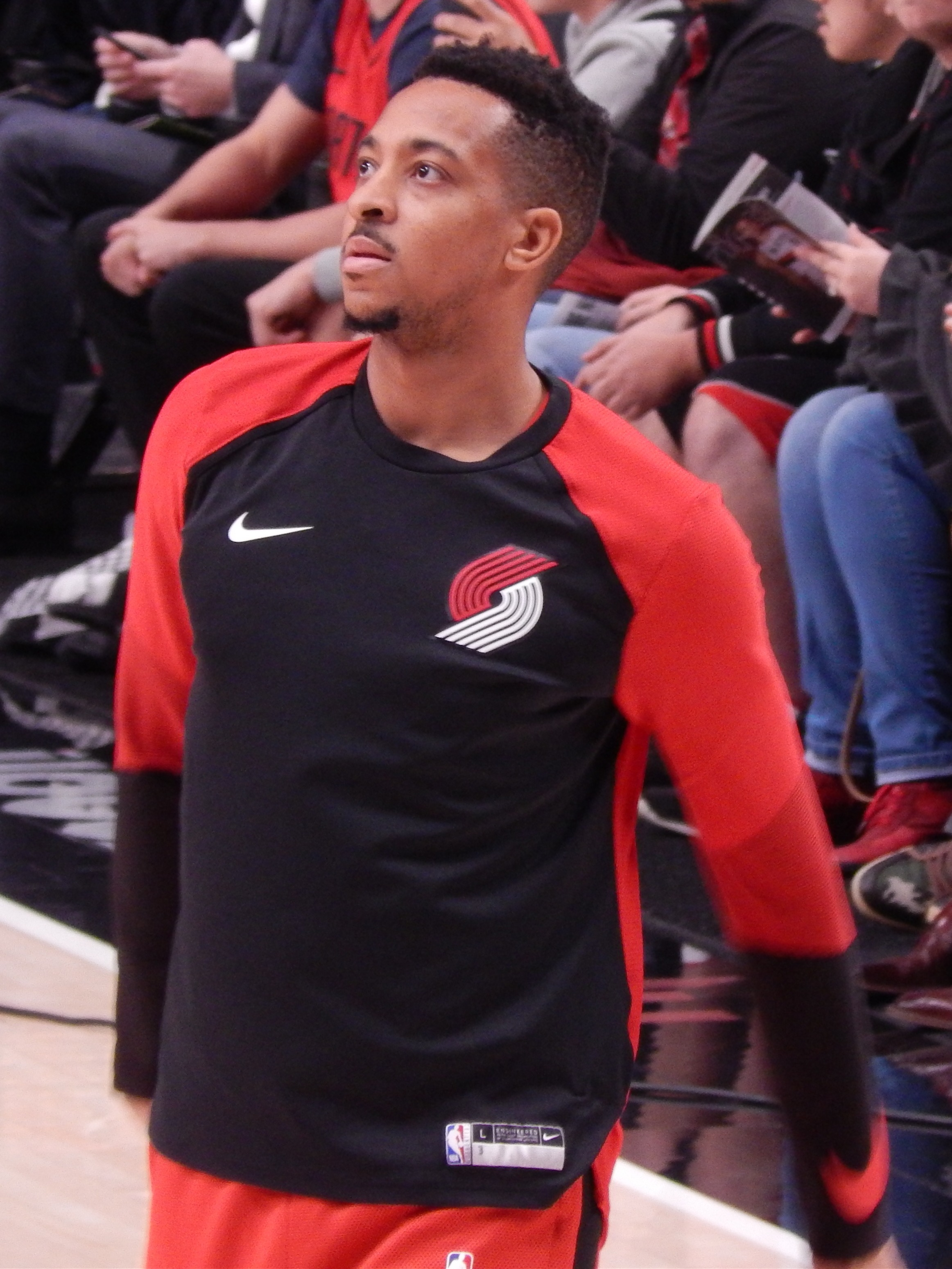
CJ McCollum, drafted 10th overall in 2013, formed a formidable back-court duo with Lillard.

Going into the 2013 NBA draft, the Trail Blazers held four picks: the 10th pick in the first round and three second-round picks. The Blazers selected guard CJ McCollum out of Lehigh University with their 10th pick, and also selected center Jeff Withey from Kansas, power forward Grant Jerrett from Arizona, and Montenegrin big man Marko Todorović. In addition, Cal guard Allen Crabbe was acquired from the Cleveland Cavaliers in exchange for two second-round picks, in the 2015 and 2016 drafts.

The Blazers finished the 2014 season with 21 more wins than the previous season, which amounted for the largest single-season improvement in franchise history. This included a period in November when they won 11 straight games, and 13–2 in the month overall, for which coach Terry Stotts took home Coach of the Month honors. On December 12, 2013, Aldridge scored 31 points and pulled down 25 rebounds in a home game against the Rockets, the first time a Trail Blazers' player recorded a 30-point, 25-rebound game. On December 14, 2013, the Blazers made a franchise-record 21 three-pointers against the Philadelphia 76ers. They tied the new record 19 days later against the Charlotte Bobcats, becoming the first NBA team to make 20 or more three-pointers in a game more than once in a season. Lillard was voted in as a reserve to his first All-Star game, joining Aldridge to represent Portland at the game. Portland finished 54–28, securing the fifth seed in the playoffs against the Rockets. The team also shot 81.5% at the free throw line, made 770 three-pointers, and started four players for all 82 regular season games, all franchise records.

The first-round series against the Rockets was a tight one, with three of the six games going to overtime. The Blazers fared well in the first two games despite not having home-court advantage, beating Houston 122–120 and 112–105 in Games 1 and 2 respectively, fueled by Aldridge's 46 points and 18 rebounds in game 1, and 43 points and three blocks in game 2. In the sixth game of the series with the Rockets threatening to force a game 7 back in Houston, down by two points with 0.9 seconds left in the game, Damian Lillard hit a buzzer-beating three-pointer to close out the series (the moment was later nicknamed "Rip City Revival", as Portland advanced to the semifinals for the first time since 2000, where they lost to the eventual champion San Antonio Spurs in five games).

During the 2014 off-season, Olshey signed center Chris Kaman and two-time former Blazers' guard Steve Blake to bolster the bench. Expectations by sportswriters and analysts were high for the Trail Blazers going into the 2015 NBA season given their surprise success in 2013–14. The Blazers beat the reigning Northwest Division Champion Oklahoma City Thunder, 106–89, in their season opener at home on October 29, 2014. Like the season before, the Trail Blazers dominated the month of November, at one point winning nine straight games from November 9 to 26 before being defeated by the Memphis Grizzlies. Injuries, which had not been significant the previous season, started to inflict themselves on various players. Starting center Lopez fractured his right hand in a game against the Spurs on December 15, 2014, and missed the next 23 games. Initially, the Blazers were much unfazed, winning 129–119 in triple overtime against the Spurs on December 19, a game that saw Lillard and Aldridge combine for 75 points on 29 field goals; Lillard netted a career-high 43 points. Four days later, Lillard hit a three-pointer to tie the game and force overtime against the Thunder en route to 40 points and a 115–111 victory. Three Blazers went to New Orleans for the All Star Weekend: Matthews for the Foot Locker Three-Point Contest, Lillard as a reserve to the All-Star Game, and Aldridge as a starter to the All-Star game.

More injuries appeared around the start of the new year, which caused Aldridge, Batum, and Joel Freeland to miss various amounts of time, but none greater than Wesley Matthews' season-ending Achilles tendon tear on March 5, 2015. Called "the heart and soul" of the team by Aldridge, Matthews was in the midst of a career year when the injury occurred. In the first half of the season, the Blazers had a record of 30–11, allowed opponents to score an average of 97.0 points, and held them to 29.7% shooting on three-pointers; in the second half, the Blazers regressed to a 21–20 record, allowed 100.2 points, and let opponents shoot 37.9% from three. The Blazers clinched a return trip to the playoffs on March 30, 2015, defeating the Phoenix Suns, 109–86. Finishing the season 51–31, they clinched their first Northwest Division title since 1999 but fell to the Grizzlies in five games in the first round of the playoffs.

In the 2015 NBA draft, the Blazers selected Arizona forward Rondae Hollis-Jefferson and subsequently traded him to the Brooklyn Nets along with Steve Blake for center Mason Plumlee and the 42nd pick, Pat Connaughton.

After losing four of their five starters at the end of the 2015–16 season, the Blazers won 44 games, were the 5th seed in the Western Conference, and beat the Clippers in six games in the first round, but were eliminated by the Golden State Warriors in five games in the Conference Semifinals.

In May 2017, the team revealed their new logo, an update of the pinwheel design with a new wordmark. According to Chris McGowan, president and CEO of the Trail Blazers, "Together, we landed on subtle changes that provide a nod to our past while allowing us to modernize other aspects of our creative assets."

The 2017–18 season saw the Blazers finish with the third seed for the first time since the 1999–2000 season. On April 21, 2018, they were eliminated in the first round of the playoffs by the New Orleans Pelicans in a 4–0 sweep.

Paul Allen, owner of the Trail Blazers since 1988, died of cancer on October 15, 2018, at the age of 65. His sister Jody Allen was named executor and trustee of his estate.

The Blazers finished the 2018–19 regular season 53–29, giving them the third seed in the Western Conference. In the first round of the playoffs, the Trail Blazers defeated the favored Oklahoma City Thunder in five games, a series which included Damian Lillard's game-winning, buzzer-beating, 37-foot three-pointer in game 5, giving them their first playoff series win since 2016. In the second round of the playoffs, they faced the Denver Nuggets. The series included a 140–137 game 3 victory by the Blazers in the first quadruple-overtime game of the NBA playoffs since 1953. The Blazers eventually won the series in seven games and advanced to their first Conference Finals since 2000. In the Western Conference Finals, they faced the two-time defending champion, the Golden State Warriors. However, they lost the series in four games, and were swept.

Following the suspension of the 2019–20 NBA season, the Blazers were one of the 22 teams invited to the NBA Bubble to participate in the final 8 games of the regular season. They erupted to number 8 but, after winning a "play-in game" over Memphis, were eliminated by Lakers in five games in the first round. The NBA decided that, at the end of the regular season part of "The Bubble" in Orlando, if the ninth seed was within four games of the eighth seed, the two teams would play at least one game. If the eighth seed won (as the Blazers did), then the play-in was over. If the ninth seed won, then another "winner-take-all" game would be played for the eighth seed. The NBA adopted a version of the play-in, a "tournament", for the postseason following the 2020–2021 season, which the Blazers avoided by finishing sixth. That play-in tournament returned for the postseason after the 2021–2022 season.

On June 4, 2021, following a first-round loss in the 2021 NBA playoffs to the Denver Nuggets, the team and head coach Stotts mutually agreed to part ways. After moving on from coach Stotts, the team hired Chauncey Billups as the franchise's next head coach.

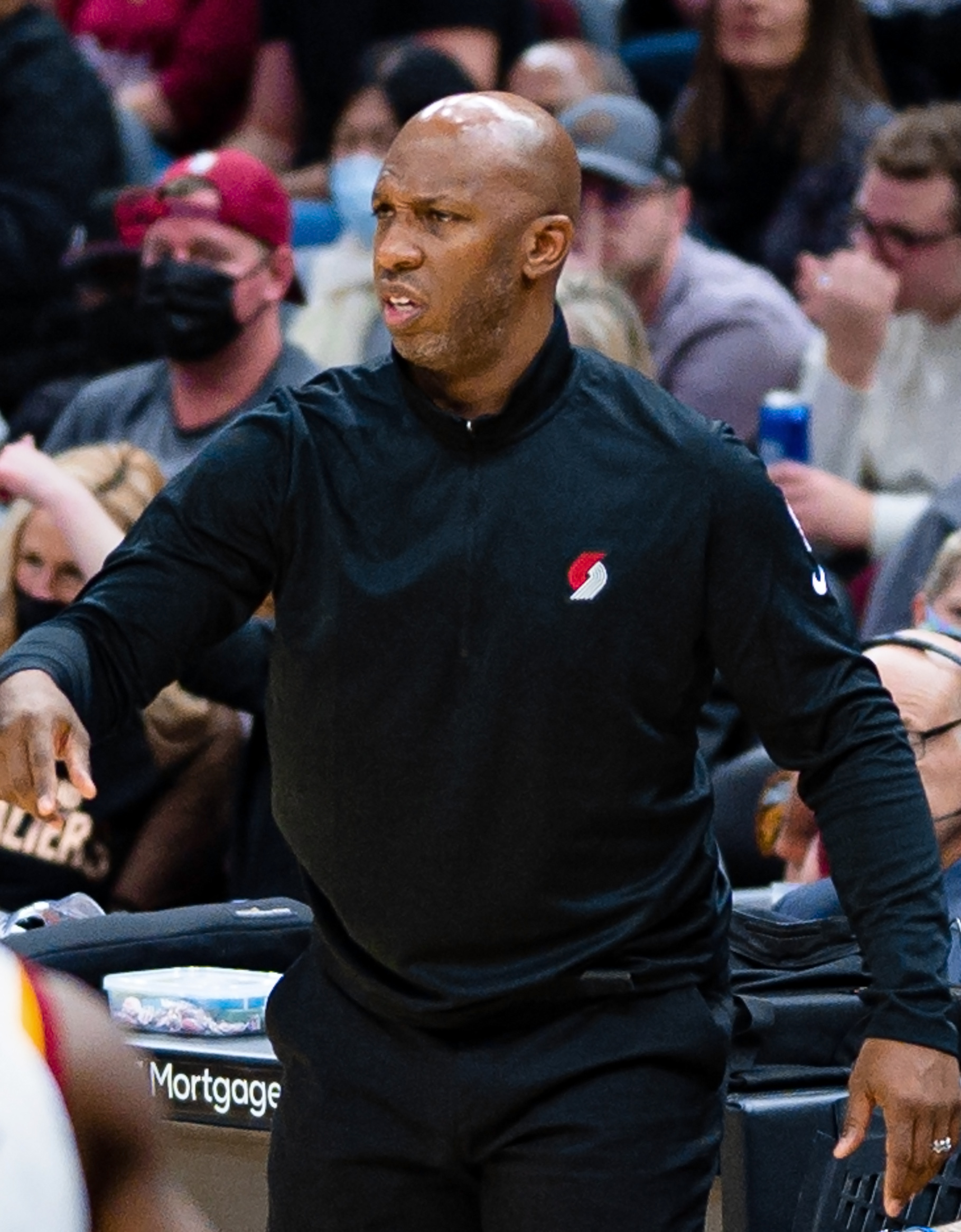
Chauncey Billups has coached the Blazers from 2021 to 2025

On February 8, 2022, in the midst of a losing season filled with injuries, the Blazers elected to trade CJ McCollum to the New Orleans Pelicans. Without McCollum in the lineup, there was an opportunity for Anfernee Simons to lead the Blazers offense. Simons play for the remainder of the season, earned him a multi-year extension.

On June 22, 2022, the Blazers received Detroit Pistons forward Jerami Grant in exchange for 2023 and 2025 draft picks.

On June 23, 2022, in the 2022 NBA draft, the Blazers selected guard Shaedon Sharpe out of the University of Kentucky and forward Jabari Walker from the University of Colorado with the 7th and 57th picks, respectively. In the 2022–23 regular season, the Blazers started well, and at one point were the top seed in the West, but then bit by bit slipped out of playoff contention. Lillard promptly requested a trade on July 1, and Portland began exploring options, though taking their time. General manager Joe Cronin was quoted as saying, "If it takes months, it takes months."

In the 2023 NBA draft, the Blazers selected guard Scoot Henderson with the third overall pick. Henderson was a standout from the NBA G league team, the NBA G League Ignite.

=== 2023–2024: Rebuilding ===
On September 27, 2023, the Blazers acquired All-Star guard Jrue Holiday, Deandre Ayton, and Toumani Camara as part of a trade that sent Lillard to the Milwaukee Bucks and Grayson Allen, Jusuf Nurkić, Nassir Little, and Keon Johnson to the Phoenix Suns. Additionally, the Blazers acquired a 2029 first-round draft pick, with the option to swap with the Bucks for the 2028 and 2030 first-round picks. Four days later, Holiday was traded to the Boston Celtics in exchange for Robert Williams III, Malcolm Brogdon, and two future first-round draft picks. Jerami Grant was re-signed to a five-year, $160 million contract. The Blazers had a poor year, missing the playoffs with a 21–61 record.

=== 2024–present: The Deni Avdija era & The return of Damian Lillard ===
With the seventh selection of the 2024 NBA draft, the Blazers selected Donovan Clingan, a center from UConn. The same day, they acquired Deni Avdija from the Washington Wizards in exchange for Brogdon, the 14th overall pick Bub Carrington, a 2029 first-round pick, and 2028 and 2030 second-round picks.

On July 19, 2025, Damian Lillard returned to the Trail Blazers after being waived by the Milwaukee Bucks, but was expected to miss the season while recuperating from a torn Achilles tendon. On October 23, 2025, the Federal Bureau of Investigation (FBI) announced that head coach Chauncey Billups was arrested as part of two separate illegal gambling-related cases. The NBA announced that it placed Billups on "immediate leave", while assistant coach Tiago Splitter was named interim head coach.

==== 2025–present: Dundon's ownership and arrival of Ja Morant ====
On August 23, 2025, Carolina Hurricanes owner Thomas Dundon purchased the Blazers for approximately $4.2 billion from the estate of Paul Allen. On March 30, 2026, the NBA Board of Governors approved the sale for $4.25 billion. On June 24, 2026, the team hired Minnesota Timberwolves assistant coach Micah Nori as the next head coach to replace Splitter.

On June 29, 2026, the Trail Blazers acquired guard Ja Morant from the Memphis Grizzlies in exchange for Jerami Grant and Kris Murray.

== Season-by-season record ==
List of the last five seasons completed by the Trail Blazers. For the full season-by-season history, see List of Portland Trail Blazers seasons.

Note: GP = Games played, W = Wins, L = Losses, W–L% = Winning percentage

Season	GP	W	L	W–L%	Finish	Playoffs
2021–22	82	27	55	.329	4th, Northwest	Did not qualify
2022–23	82	33	49	.402	5th, Northwest	Did not qualify
2023–24	82	21	61	.256	5th, Northwest	Did not qualify
2024–25	82	36	46	.439	4th, Northwest	Did not qualify
2025–26	82	42	40	.512	4th, Northwest	Lost in first round, 1–4 (Spurs)

== Personnel ==
=== Current roster ===
Portland Trail Blazers roster
Players

Pos.	No.	Player	Height	Weight	DOB	From
F	8	Deni Avdija	6 ft 8 in (2.03 m)	227 lb (103 kg)	2001-01-03	Tichon Hadash
F	33	Toumani Camara	6 ft 7 in (2.01 m)	230 lb (104 kg)	2000-05-08	Dayton
C	10	Branden Carlson	7 ft 0 in (2.13 m)	220 lb (100 kg)	1999-06-14	Utah
F	91	Sidy Cissoko	6 ft 6 in (1.98 m)	220 lb (100 kg)	2004-04-02	France
C	23	Donovan Clingan	7 ft 2 in (2.18 m)	285 lb (129 kg)	2004-02-23	Connecticut
G	00	Scoot Henderson	6 ft 3 in (1.91 m)	205 lb (93 kg)	2004-02-03	Carlton J. Kell HS (GA)
G	5	Jrue Holiday	6 ft 4 in (1.93 m)	220 lb (100 kg)	1990-06-12	UCLA
F	29	Jayson Kent (TW)	6 ft 8 in (2.03 m)	210 lb (95 kg)	2002-02-03	Texas
F	27	Vít Krejčí (injured)	6 ft 8 in (2.03 m)	215 lb (98 kg)	2000-06-19	Czech Republic
G	0	Damian Lillard	6 ft 2 in (1.88 m)	200 lb (91 kg)	1990-07-15	Weber State
G	1	Ja Morant (injured)	6 ft 2 in (1.88 m)	174 lb (79 kg)	1999-08-10	Murray State
F/C	9	Micah Potter	6 ft 9 in (2.06 m)	250 lb (113 kg)	1998-04-06	Wisconsin
G	17	Shaedon Sharpe (injured)	6 ft 5 in (1.96 m)	210 lb (95 kg)	2003-05-30	Dream City Christian (AZ)
G	2	John Tonje (TW)	6 ft 4 in (1.93 m)	223 lb (101 kg)	2001-04-23	Wisconsin
C	35	Robert Williams III	6 ft 9 in (2.06 m)	250 lb (113 kg)	1997-10-17	Texas A&M
C	16	Hansen Yang	7 ft 1 in (2.16 m)	267 lb (121 kg)	2005-06-26	Zibo High School
G	11	Chris Youngblood (TW)	6 ft 4 in (1.93 m)	223 lb (101 kg)	2002-02-09	Alabama

Coaches
Head coach
- Micah Nori
Assistant(s)
- Jay Triano
- Quinton Crawford
- Mike Williams
- Gilbert Abraham
- Leron Black

Legend
- (DP) Unsigned draft pick
- (FA) Free agent
- (S) Suspended
- (GL) On assignment to G League
- (TW) Two-way affiliate player
- Injured

Roster
Updated: October 30, 2026

=== Retained draft rights ===
The Trail Blazers hold the draft rights to the following unsigned draft picks who have been playing outside the NBA. A drafted player, either an international draftee or a college draftee who is not signed by the team that drafted him, is allowed to sign with any non-NBA teams. In this case, the team retains the player's draft rights in the NBA until one year after the player's contract with the non-NBA team ends. This list includes draft rights that were acquired from trades with other teams.

Draft	Round	Pick	Player	Pos.	Nationality	Current team	Note(s)	Ref
2015	2	54	Dani Díez	F	Spain	Longevida San Pablo Burgos (Spain)	Acquired from the Utah Jazz (via New York)	
2008	2	44	Ante Tomić	C	Croatia	Joventut Badalona (Spain)	Acquired from the Utah Jazz (via New York)	

=== Retired numbers ===
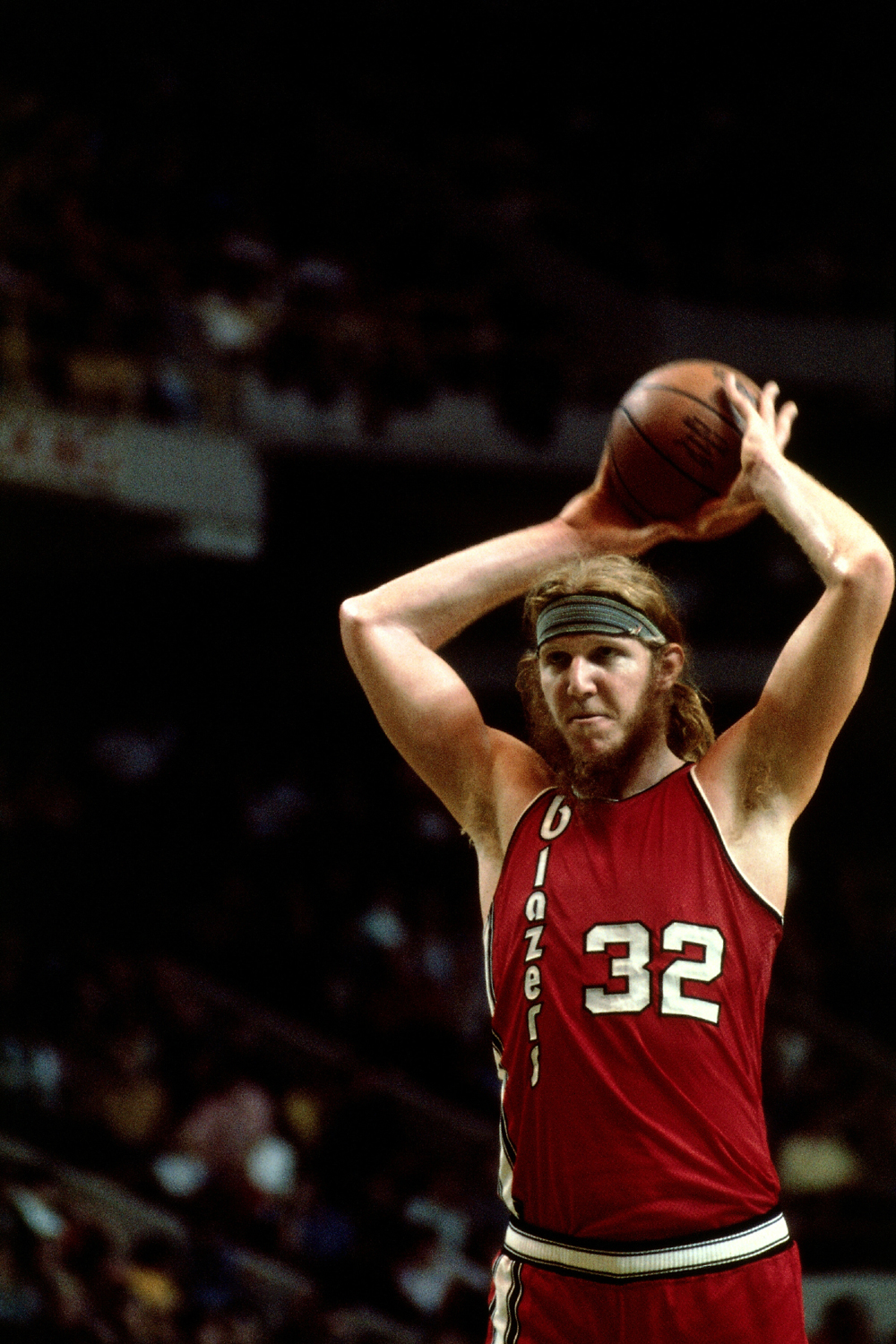
Bill Walton

Portland Trail Blazers retired numbers
No.	Player	Position	Tenure	Retired
1 ^{1}	Larry Weinberg	Owner	1970–1988	1992
13	Dave Twardzik	G	1976–1980	October 11, 1981
14	Lionel Hollins	G	1975–1980	April 18, 2007
15	Larry Steele	G	1971–1980	October 11, 1981
20	Maurice Lucas	F	1976–1980; 1987–1988	November 4, 1988
22	Clyde Drexler	G	1983–1995	March 6, 2001
30	Bob Gross	F	1975–1982	December 18, 2008
30	Terry Porter	G	1985–1995	December 16, 2008
32	Bill Walton	C	1974–1979	November 3, 1989
36	Lloyd Neal	F/C	1972–1979	March 24, 1979
45	Geoff Petrie	G	1970–1976	October 11, 1981
77 ^{2}	Jack Ramsay	Head coach	1976–1986	January 14, 1993
	Bill Schonely	Broadcaster	1970–1998	November 3, 2003

Notes:

- ^{1} As team owner and founder, the number is still available to players.
- ^{2} Ramsay did not play for the team; the number represents the 1977 NBA Championship he won while coaching the Blazers.
- The NBA retired Bill Russell's No. 6 for all its member teams on August 11, 2022.

=== Basketball Hall of Famers ===
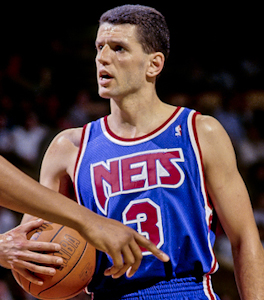
Dražen Petrović, who was drafted by the Trail Blazers, was elected to the Naismith Memorial Basketball Hall of Fame and the FIBA Hall of Fame.

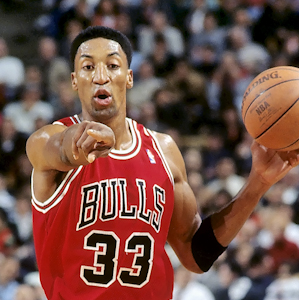
Naismith Memorial Basketball Hall of Fame member Scottie Pippen played in Portland from 1999 to 2003.

==== Naismith Memorial Basketball Hall of Fame ====
Portland Trail Blazers Hall of Famers
Players
No.	Name	Position	Tenure	Inducted
19	Lenny Wilkens ^{1}	G	1974–1975	1989
32	Bill Walton	C	1974–1979	1993
44	Dražen Petrović ^{2}	G	1989–1991	2002
22	Clyde Drexler ^{3}	G/F	1983–1995	2004
33	Scottie Pippen ^{4}	F	1999–2003	2010
11	Arvydas Sabonis	C	1995–2001; 2002–2003	2011
6	Walter Davis^{2}	G/F	1991	2024
00	Carmelo Anthony ^{6}	F	2019–2021	2025
Coaches
Name		Position	Tenure	Inducted
77	Jack Ramsay	Head coach	1976–1986	1992
Lenny Wilkens ^{1}		Head coach	1974–1976	1998
12	Rick Adelman ^{5}	Assistant coach Head coach	1983–1989; 1989–1994	2021

Notes:

- ^{1} In total, Wilkens was inducted into the Hall of Fame three times: as player, as coach and as a member of the 1992 Olympic team.
- ^{2} Inducted posthumously.
- ^{3} In total, Drexler was inducted into the Hall of Fame twice: as player and as a member of the 1992 Olympic team.
- ^{4} In total, Pippen was inducted into the Hall of Fame twice: as player and as a member of the 1992 Olympic team.
- ^{5} Also played for the team (1970–1973).
- ^{6} In total, Anthony was inducted into the Hall of Fame twice: as player and as a member of the 2008 Olympic team.

==== FIBA Hall of Fame ====
Portland Trail Blazers Hall of Famers
Players
No.	Name	Position	Tenure	Inducted
10	Fernando Martín ^{1}	C/F	1986–1987	2007
44	Dražen Petrović ^{1}	G	1989–1991	2007
11	Arvydas Sabonis	C	1995–2001; 2002–2003	2010
21	Fabricio Oberto	C	2010	2019
12	Detlef Schrempf	F	1999–2001	2021

Notes:

- ^{1} Inducted posthumously.

=== NBA draft ===
The Trail Blazers have had the No. 1 pick in the NBA draft four times in their history; each time selecting a center. In 1972 the choice was LaRue Martin, Bill Walton was picked in 1974, Mychal Thompson in 1978, and Greg Oden was taken in 2007. Several Blazers' picks have been criticized by NBA commentators as particularly unfortunate:

- The selection of Martin over Bob McAdoo.
- The selection of center Sam Bowie with the No. 2 pick in the 1984 NBA draft over Michael Jordan (who was then picked next by the Chicago Bulls); other notable players taken later in that draft include future Hall-of-Famers Charles Barkley and John Stockton.
- The selection of Greg Oden over Kevin Durant in 2007.
- Other notable draft picks include player-coach Geoff Petrie, Sidney Wicks, Larry Steele, Lionel Hollins and Jim Paxson in the 1970s and Clyde Drexler, Jerome Kersey, Terry Porter and Arvydas Sabonis in the 1980s.

In the 1990s, the Blazers selected Jermaine O'Neal and in the modern millennium drafted Zach Randolph and, in 2006, acquired Brandon Roy and LaMarcus Aldridge in a draft day that included six trades involving the Trail Blazers.

== Team branding ==
Previous logos of the Portland Trail Blazers

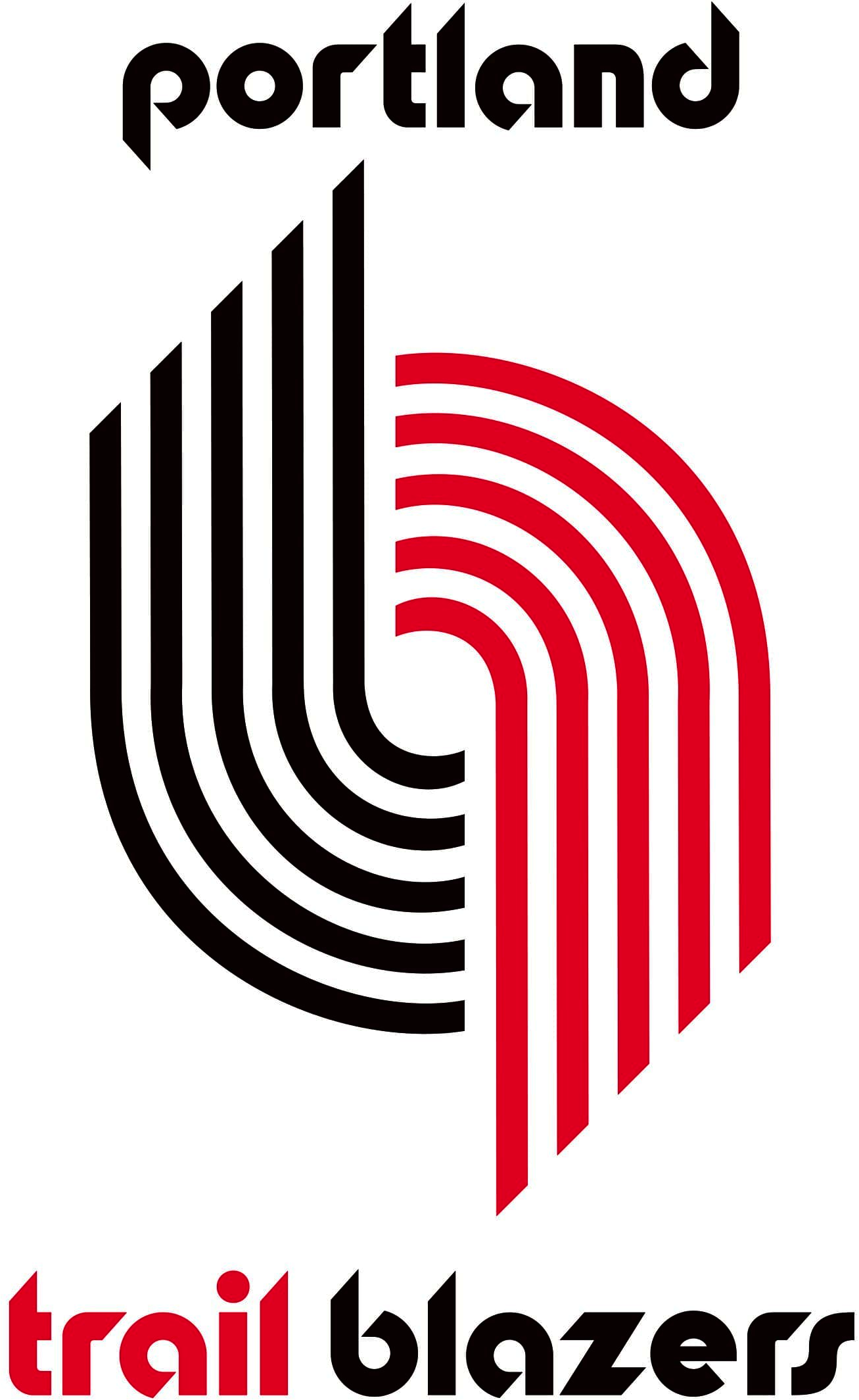
1970 to 1990

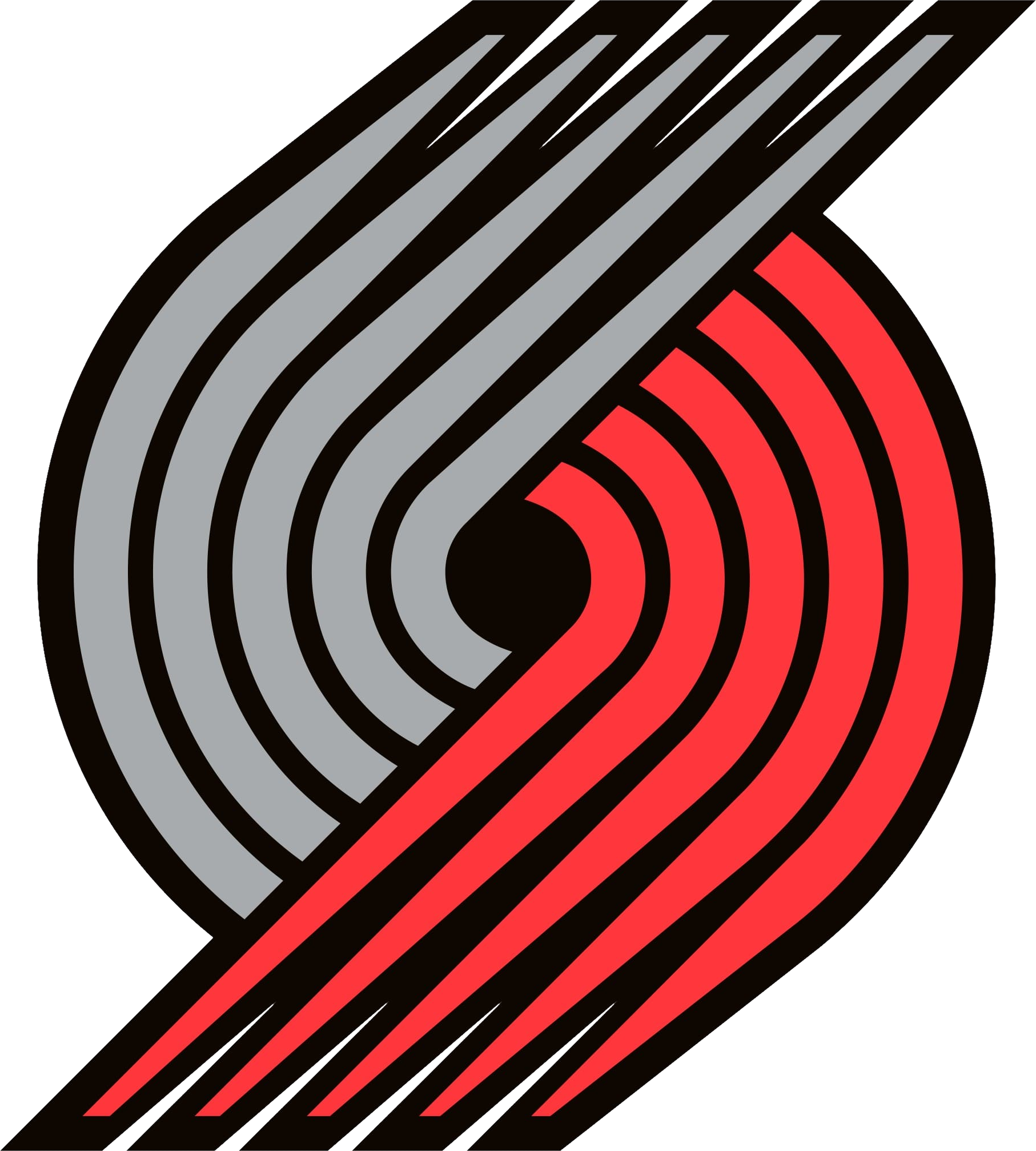
2002 to 2003

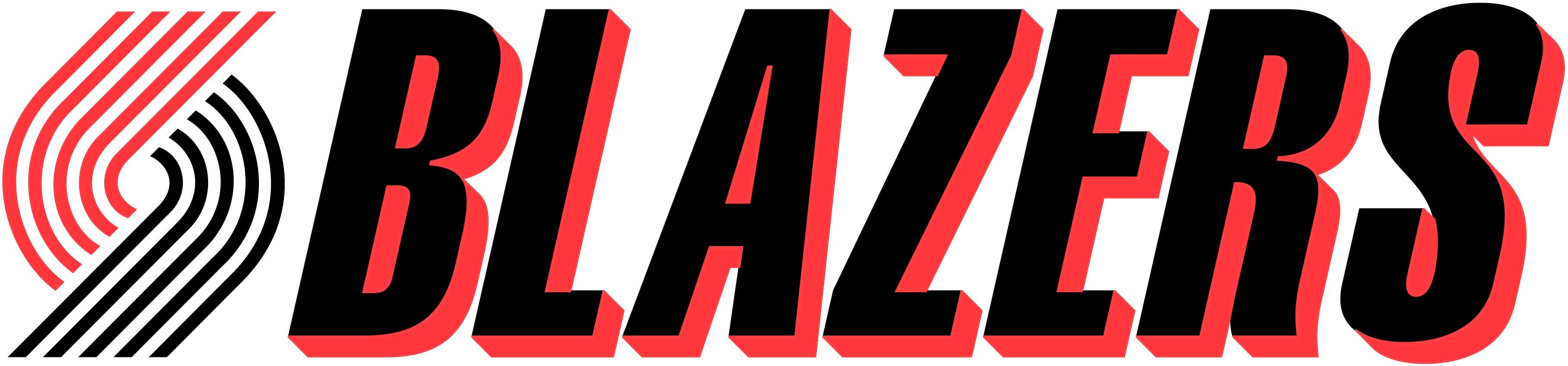
1990 to 2002

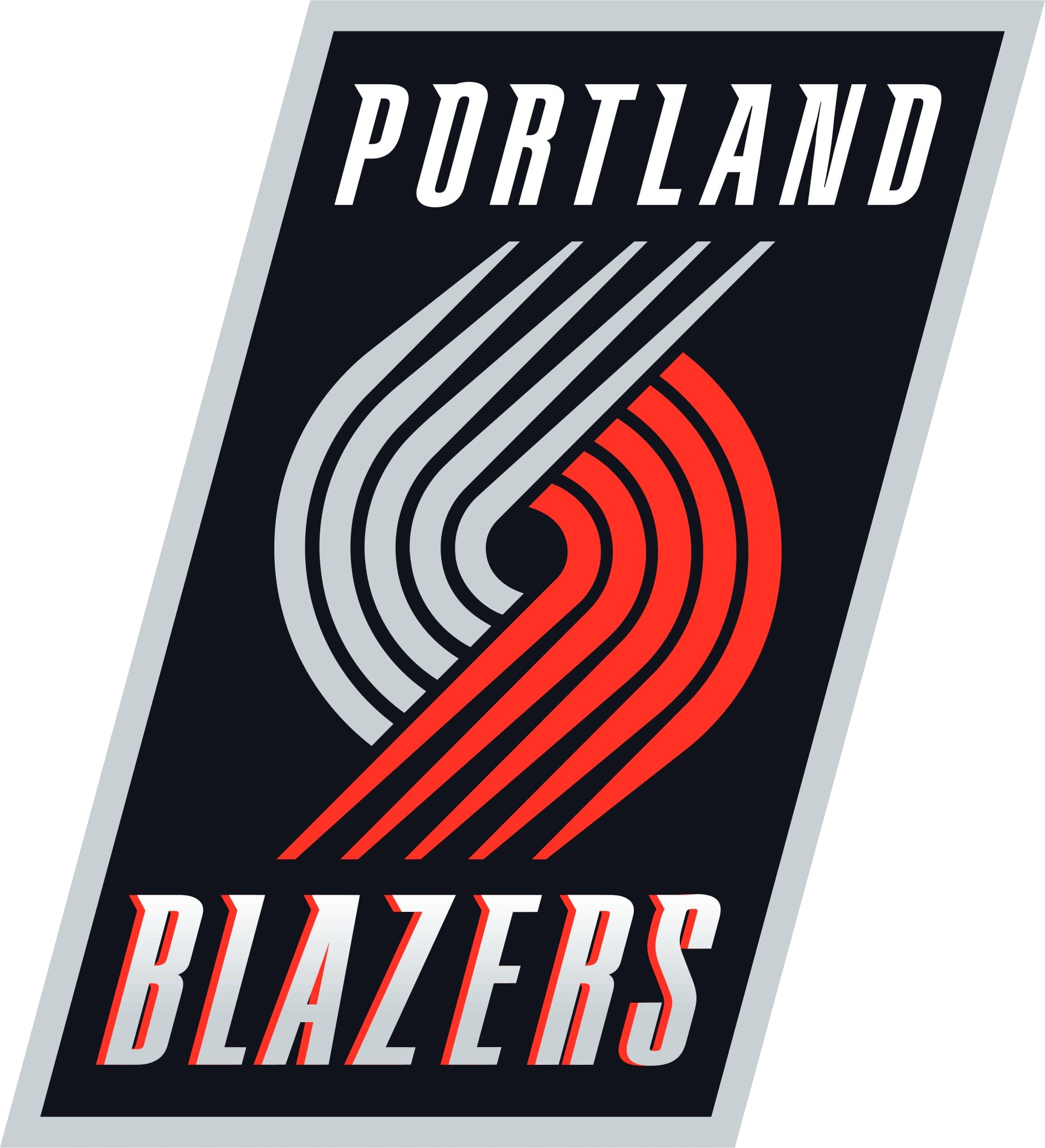
2003 to 2004

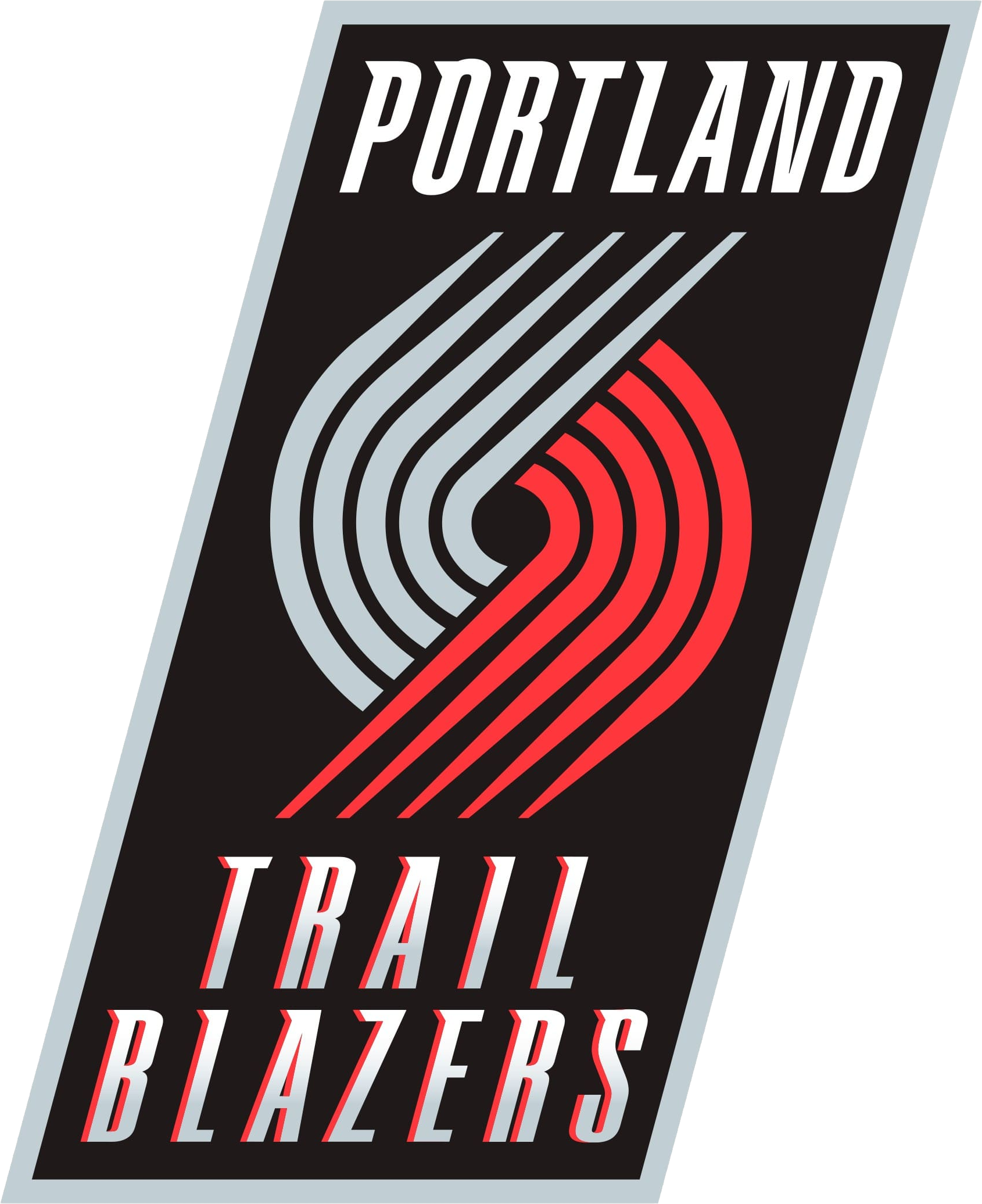
2004 to 2017

The team's colors are red, black, and white. The team's "pinwheel" logo, originally designed by the cousin of founder Harry Glickman, is a graphic interpretation of two five-on-five basketball teams lined up against each other. One side of the pinwheel is red; the other side is black or white. The logo has gone from a vertical alignment to a slanted one starting in the 1991 season, creating a straight edge along the top.

The Blazers' initial uniforms were white at home and red on the road. The 1970–1975 design featured a swooping tail accenting the last letter ('blazers' on the home uniforms; 'Portland' on the road uniforms). The 1975–1977 uniforms featured the team name written vertically on the right side; this uniform was used in their 1977 championship season.

Following their championship victory, the Blazers unveiled a new look featuring a red, black and/or white sash that runs diagonally down the uniform. The team also switched their road uniforms to black, which they wore from 1977 to 1979, and again from 1985 to 1991. In the interim, a red uniform was used in lieu of the black uniforms from 1979 to 1985. These uniforms contained the lowercase 'blazers' in front. Following a redesign in the 1991–92 season, the Blazers updated their look to feature uppercase letters. Initially, the white uniform featured black letters with red drop shadows, but the color scheme was reversed mid-season. The black uniform letters were changed to white with red drop shadows. A 2002–03 rebrand saw the team add silver accents, update the white uniform letters back to black, and introduce a red alternate uniform, while a slight change in the 2005–06 season saw the Blazers return to the city name on their road uniforms.

The 2009–10 season saw the Blazers unveil a fourth alternate uniform, a design that features the team's 'Rip City' nickname and a more subtle version of the sash on the side. This uniform was tweaked to include sleeves in the 2014–15 season. For the 2012–13 season, the Blazers changed their red alternate uniform to include black lettering, a more tapered sash, and the pinwheel logo atop of it.

For the 2017–18 season, the Blazers made some slight revisions to their look upon moving to Nike, changing the alignment of the city and team name from italicized to straight while adding the 'Rip City' nickname on the waistband. They also changed their red alternate uniform to include a black and grey variation of the sash inspired from the team's pinwheel logo and a lack of white elements. In the 2019–20 season, the red "Statement" uniform was updated to feature white letters, white numbers with black trim and a thin white strip above the series of black and grey strips. This was due to visibility concerns surrounding the previous red uniform. Then in the 2022–23 season, in collaboration with Damian Lillard, the Trail Blazers updated their "Statement" uniform, only featuring the iconic "pinwheel" logo in black along with black/red side striping inspired by the aforementioned logo. In the 2025–26 season, both the "Association" and "Icon" uniform eliminated the silver accents and the contrasting neck and armhole striping.

In addition to the "Association", "Icon" and "Statement" uniforms, Nike released annual "City" uniform designs. The Blazers' 2017–18 "City" uniforms were predominantly black with a grayscale plaid pattern (in homage to former head coach Jack Ramsay), 'Rip City' and lettering in red, and a silhouette of the Portland city flag on the beltline. The 2018–19 season "City" uniforms again used the 'Rip City' concept, this time with a more subdued red "blaze" strip and black and dark grey background. In addition, the Blazers wore an "Earned" uniform by virtue of qualifying in the 2018 playoffs. The uniforms were similar to the 'Rip City' jerseys but with a red base and white letters with black trim. The "Earned" jersey was only used for that season before it was shelved permanently. The 2019–20 "City" uniform was heavily inspired by the team's original white uniforms, featuring 'Rip City' and block numerals in red with black trim, along with player names in black. In the 2020–21 season, the Blazers' "City" uniform will pay homage to the Oregon landscape and its native tribes. The uniform features a brown base with black lines similar to a wood grain, a series of zig-zag lines in shades of red, blue, yellow and orange along the right side, and the "Oregon" insignia found on the White Stag sign. The waist also includes the Oregon outline and nine blue triangles symbolizing the state's native tribes. As in 2019, the Blazers also wore an "Earned" uniform after qualifying in the 2020 playoffs. The uniforms were patterned after the team's "Association" uniform but lacked the red elements and had a silver base. For the NBA's 2021–22 75th anniversary season, the Blazers' "City" uniform was a mixture of past uniform elements. Once again going to the 'Rip City' concept, this uniform featured the same number font as the 1991–2002 uniforms, the red and gray plaid striping in homage to Jack Ramsay, the "Portland" script from the team's first uniforms on the waist, tributes to Portland's 'City of Roses' moniker and the team's 1977 championship and 1990 and 1992 conference titles, and a white circle surrounding the current logo in homage to the center court of Veterans Memorial Coliseum.

For the Trail Blazers' 2022–23 "City" uniform, the team went with a black uniform with teal and silver accents, replacing the trademark diagonal strip with a pattern inspired by the carpet found at Portland International Airport. "PDX" in silver letters was positioned above the uniform. The "PDX" uniform returned in the 2025–26 season.

The Trail Blazers again honored Dr. Jack Ramsay for their 2023–24 "City" uniform, featuring a black base, black grayscale plaid patterns, and red plaid letters. The "Rip City" throwback lettering was brought back with this uniform, along with cream numbers trimmed in red. A red-based 2023 NBA in-season tournament court with a middle cream strip was paired with this uniform, with silhouettes of the NBA Cup. This theme would continue on the team's 2024–25 "City" uniform, this time as homage to Portland's iconic plaid heritage and a salute to Mount Hood on the shorts. The black-based design again featured "Rip City" in white with grayscale plaid patterns.

The team's mascot is Blaze the Trail Cat, a two-tone silver-colored mountain lion, which has been the team's official mascot since 2002.

From 1987 to 1989, Portland's official mascot was Bigfoot, which was former Trail Blazers player Dale Schlueter in a sasquatch costume that was 9 feet (2.7 m) tall. The concept was pitched to the Trail Blazers front office by Jay Isaac of Isaac-Ross Productions. On March 22, 1989, following a 151–127 victory over Portland, Golden State Warriors head coach Don Nelson protested to the media about a skit during a timeout, in which Bigfoot crushed a model of the Golden Gate Bridge while the song "I Left My Heart in San Francisco" played over the public address system. Bigfoot was discontinued as Portland's mascot following the incident. A new Bigfoot character nicknamed Douglas Fur was introduced in March 2023 to serve as a secondary mascot alongside Blaze the Trail Cat. A popular unofficial mascot was the late Bill "The Beerman" Scott, a Seattle beer vendor-cheerleader who worked for numerous pro teams, including the Trail Blazers, the Seattle Seahawks, and the Seattle Mariners. Scott worked for the Trail Blazers from 1981 through 1985.

== Front office ==
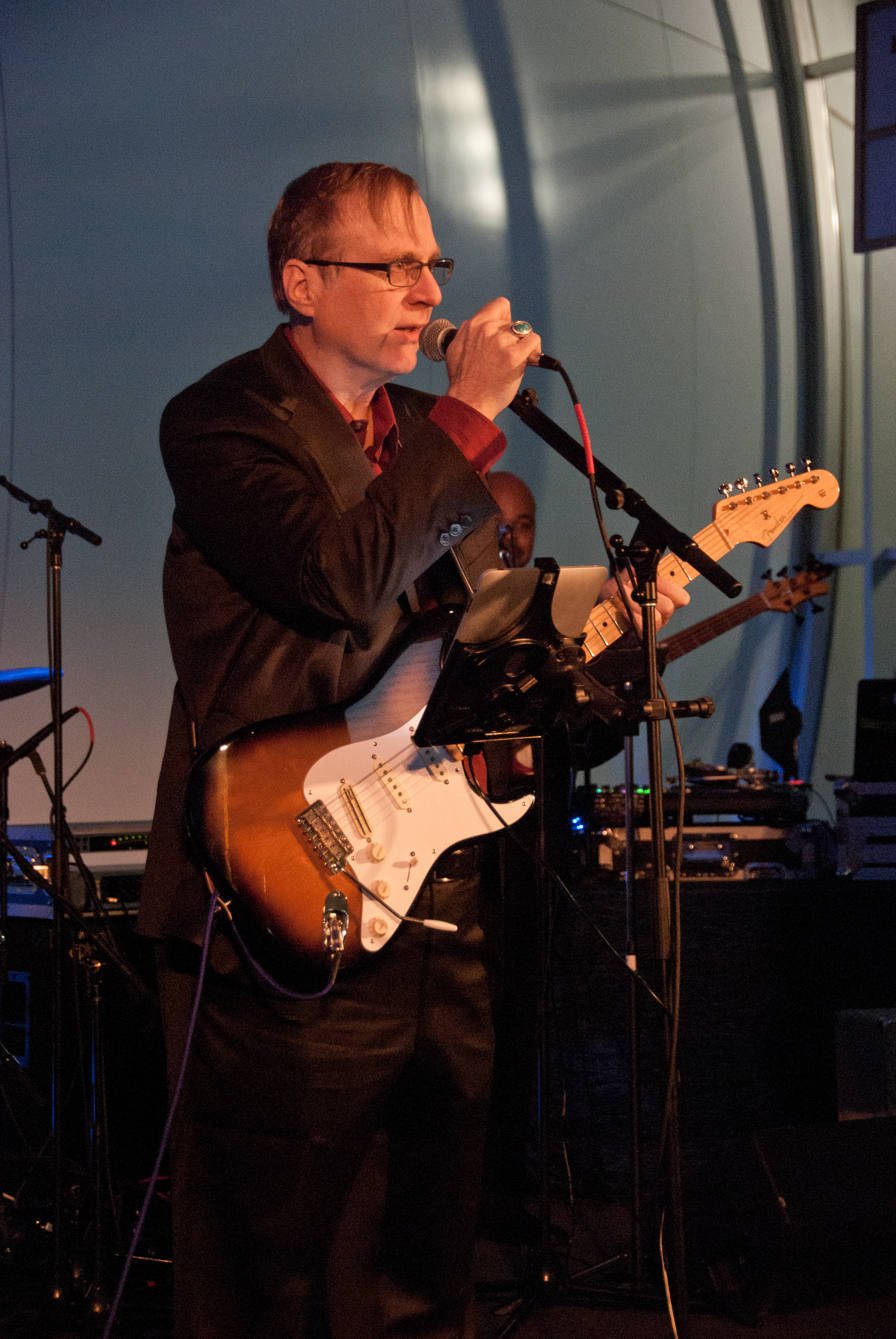
Microsoft co-founder and Vulcan Inc. chairman Paul Allen owned the Trail Blazers from 1988 until his death in 2018.

On April 3, 2026, Thomas Dundon and various investors under the "Rip City Rising" ownership group purchased the Trail Blazers from the estate of Paul Allen. The current general manager is Joe Cronin, who initially took over the position on an interim basis in December 2021 before assuming the full-time role in May 2022.

The team from 1988 until 2018 was owned by Microsoft co-founder Paul Allen, after which ownership of the Trail Blazers was inherited via a series of holding companies which Allen owned. Vulcan Inc. is a private corporation in which currently Allen's sister Jody Allen as head of Paul Allen's estate is the chairman and sole shareholder. A subsidiary of Vulcan, Vulcan Sports and Entertainment (VSE), manages Allen's sports-related properties, including the Trail Blazers, the Seattle Seahawks NFL team, Seattle Sounders FC of MLS, and the Moda Center. In the fall of 2012, Peter McLoughlin was named CEO of Vulcan Sports and Entertainment.

The Trail Blazers as a corporate entity are owned by VSE. Jody Allen as head of estate serves as the team's chairman, and her longtime associate Bert Kolde is vice-chairman. The position of president and chief executive officer is held by Chris McGowan, with Larry Miller having held the job until resigning in July 2012. The post of chief operating officer is vacant; the most recent COO of the team was Mike Golub, who resigned in July 2008 to take a more enhanced role with VSE. Kevin Pritchard served as general manager of the Trail Blazers until he was fired on June 24, 2010. The announcement was issued by the Blazers' head office just an hour before the beginning of the 2010 NBA draft. A month later, the Blazers named Oklahoma City Thunder assistant general manager Rich Cho as their new general manager. Cho was fired less than a year later, and director of college scouting Chad Buchanan served as interim general manager for the entire 2011–12 season. In June 2012, the Trail Blazers hired Neil Olshey as general manager.

Before Allen purchased the team in 1988, the Trail Blazers were owned by a group of investors headed by Larry Weinberg, who is chairman emeritus.

== Venues ==
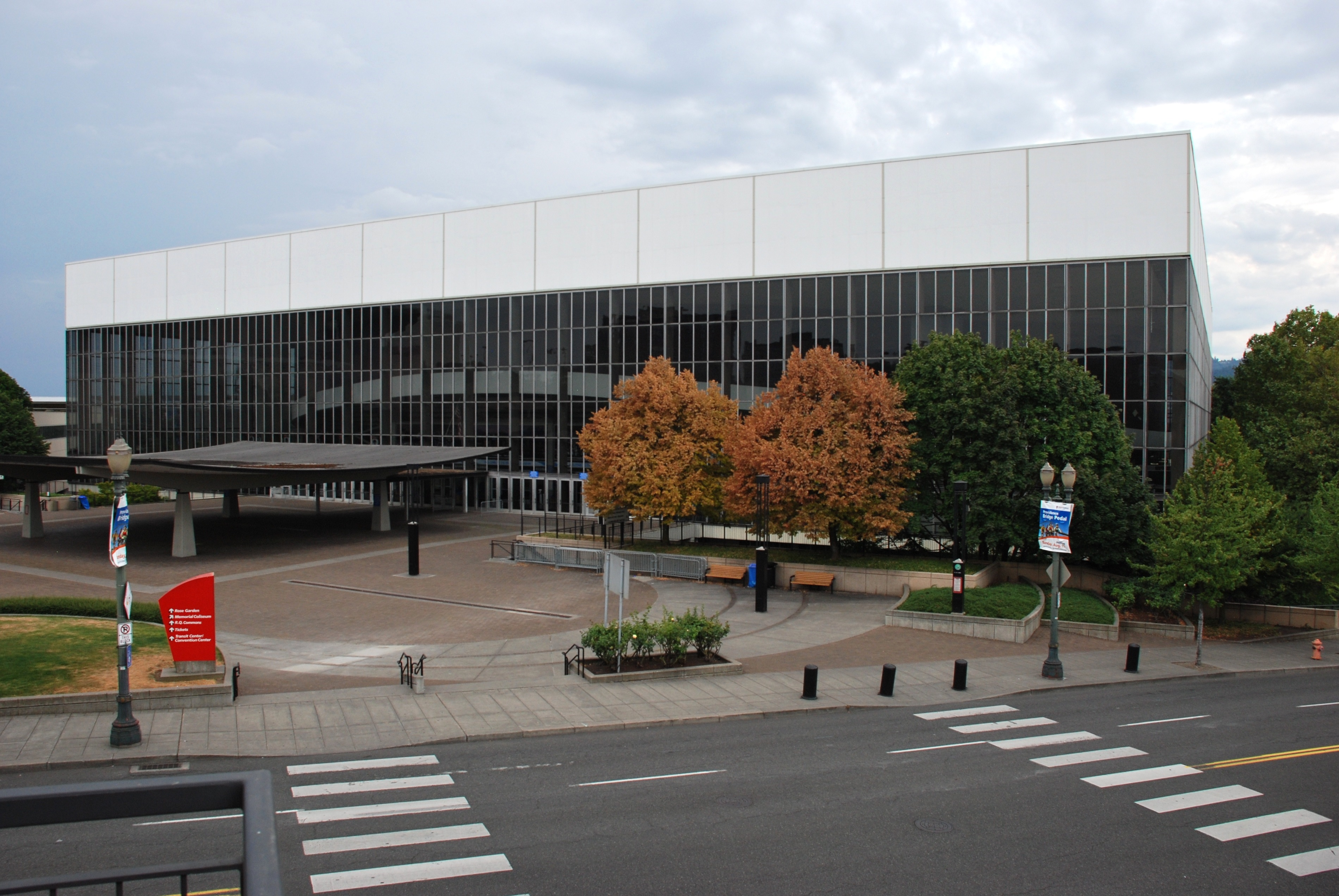
Portland's Memorial Coliseum, home of the Blazers from 1970 to 1995

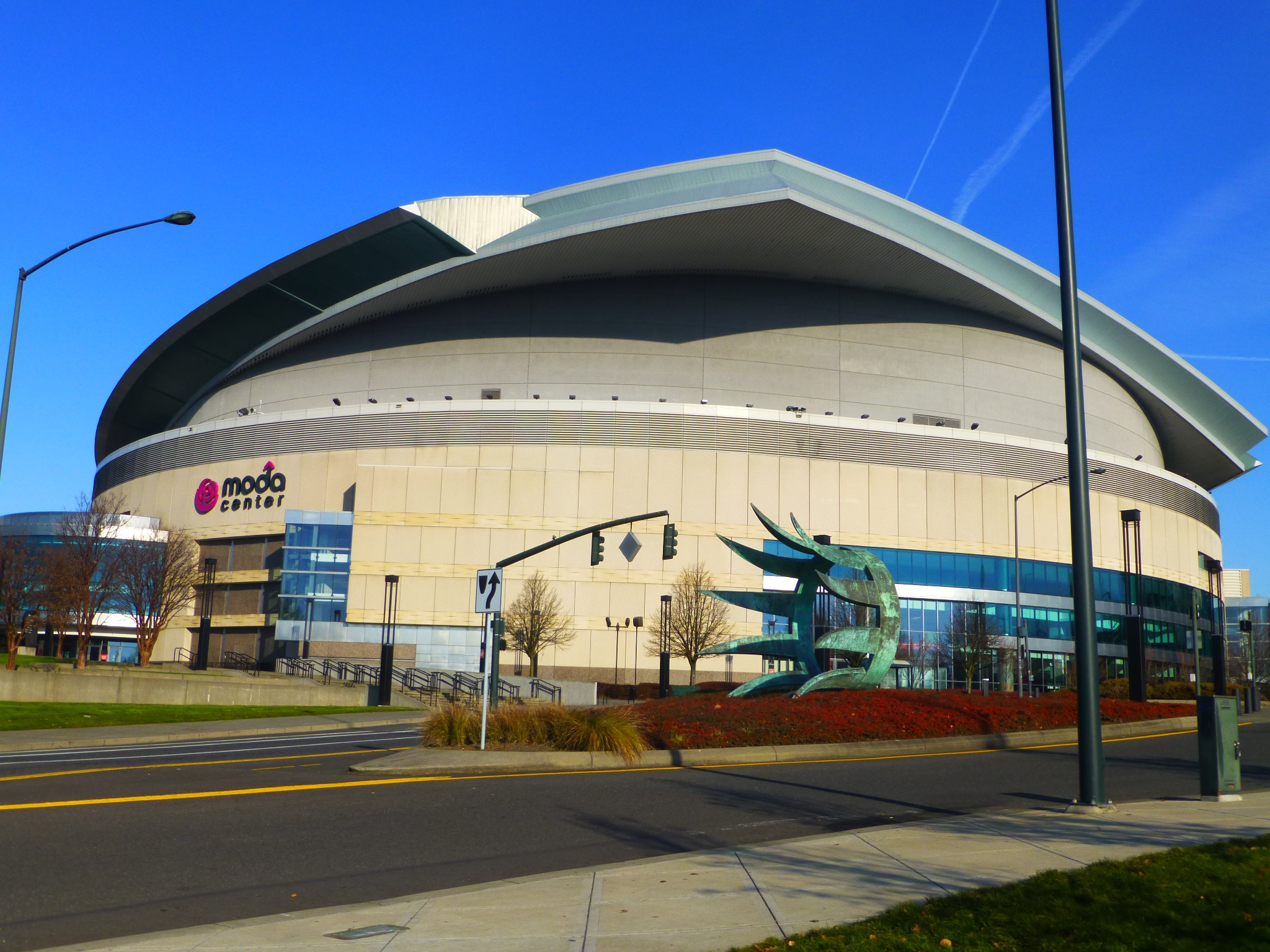
Moda Center (originally Rose Garden), home of the Blazers since 1995

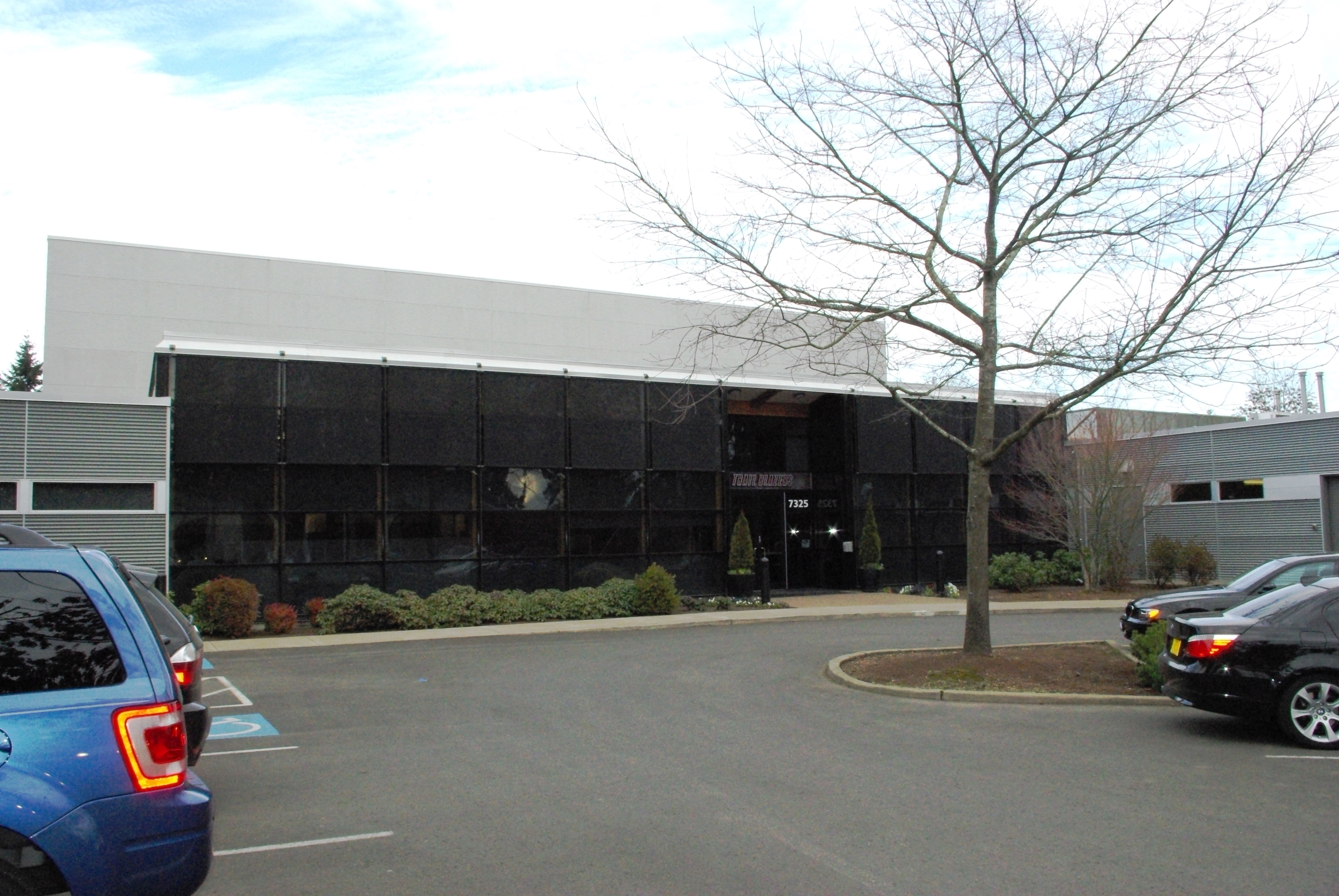
The team's headquarters and practice facility are in Tualatin, Oregon.

The Trail Blazers play their home games in the Moda Center, a multipurpose arena which is located in Portland's Rose Quarter, northeast of downtown. The Moda Center, originally named the Rose Garden, opened in 1995 and can seat a total of 19,980 spectators for basketball games; capacity increases to 20,580 with standing room. Like the Trail Blazers, the Moda Center is owned by Paul Allen through subsidiary Vulcan Sports and Entertainment. During a two-year period between 2005 and 2007, the arena was owned by a consortium of creditors who financed its construction after the Oregon Arena Corporation, a now-defunct holding company owned by Allen, filed for bankruptcy in 2004. In August 2013, the arena's name was changed from the Rose Garden to the Moda Center, after the Blazers' front office officials reached a $4 million agreement with Moda Health Corporation. The name change was met with considerable criticism from fans.

Prior to 1995, the Trail Blazers' home venue was the Memorial Coliseum, which today stands adjacent to the Moda Center. This facility, built in 1960, can seat 12,888 spectators for basketball (originally 12,666). It was renamed the Veterans Memorial Coliseum in 2011.

=== In-game entertainment ===
The team has a cheerleading-dance squad known as the BlazerDancers. Consisting of 16 members, the BlazerDancers perform dance routines at home games, charity events, and promotional events. A junior dance team composed of 8- to 11-year-old girls also performs at selected home games, as does a hip hop dance troupe. Other regular in-game entertainment acts include a co-educational acrobatic stunt team which performs technically difficult cheers, a break dancing squad known as the Portland TrailBreakers, and a pair of percussion acts.

== Fan support and "Blazermania" ==
The relationship between the team and its fans, commonly known as "Blazermania", has been well-chronicled. The Trail Blazers have long been one of the NBA's top draws, with the exception of two periods in the team's history. The team drew poorly during its first four seasons of existence, failing to average more than 10,000 spectators per game. Attendance increased during the 1974–75 season, when the team drafted Bill Walton.

The phenomenon known as Blazermania started during the 1976–77 season, when the team posted its first winning record, made its first playoff appearance, and captured its only NBA title, defeating the heavily favored Philadelphia 76ers in the NBA Finals; the team has been popular in Portland since that time. That season, the team started a sellout streak which continued until the team moved into the Rose Garden in 1995. The team continued to average over 19,000 spectators per game until the 2003–04 season, when attendance declined after the team continued to suffer image problems due to the "Jail Blazer" reputation it had gained, and was no longer as competitive on the court. After drafting eventual Rookie of the Year and three-time All Star Brandon Roy in 2006, attendance climbed in the 2006–07 season and continued to rebound in the 2007–08 season. The final 27 home games of the 2007–2008 season were consecutive sell-outs, a streak that continued through the entire 2008–2009 season and into the start of the 2011–2012 season.

The team's rallying cry, "Rip City", was coined by broadcaster Bill Schonely during the team's first season and remains an integral part of the team's and fanbase's identity.

In the 2023–24 season, the Blazers began testing "OneCourt Haptic Displays", a haptic device that allows fans with low vision or blindness to be able to "watch" live games. The device was made more accessible the following season. It uses generative audio and haptics to "translate live gameplay into trackable vibrations".

== Media ==
=== Television ===
Mike Rice was the Trail Blazers' television color commentator from 2006 to 2016.

Mike Barrett (right) was Portland's television play-by-play announcer from 2003 to 2016.

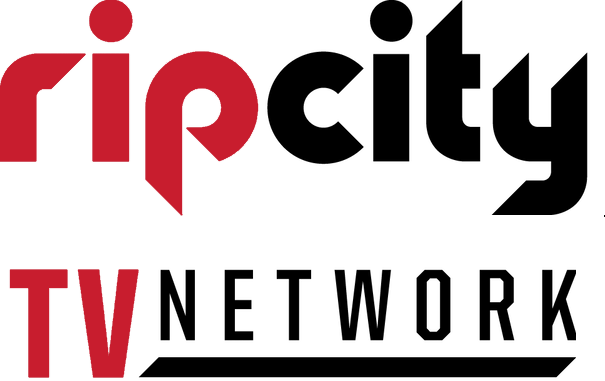
Logo for the team's current broadcaster, the Rip City Television Network.

The Trail Blazers' former television play-by-play team was Mike Barrett and Mike Rice, joined by sideline reporter Michael Holton, who succeeded Terry Porter (2010–11) and Rebecca Haarlow (2009–10). The team was also known for its long association with Steve "Snapper" Jones, who played for the team prior to his career as a television analyst; Jones departed the franchise in 2005.

Regional television coverage of Trail Blazers games was limited until the 1980s, with only closed-circuit broadcasts at the Paramount Theatre available by the mid-70s. In the 1980s, the team reached an agreement with KOIN to carry games on television; to protect the team's ticket sales, the package was largely limited to away games. The telecasts also had to be scheduled around CBS network programming that could not be pre-empted, such as 60 Minutes.

In the 1990s, the team split its home games between broadcast television (with KGW serving as flagship station by 2000) and a pay-per-view service known as BlazerVision; the team did not disclose how many viewers subscribed to the service, while Portland Business Journal writer Andy Giegerich criticized the service when it was assigned early-round playoff games in the 1999–2000 season (thus resulting in blackouts of TNT's national coverage), and anecdotally noted that the Trail Blazers lost more often in games that were on BlazerVision or otherwise untelevised. The pay per view component was removed for the 2000–01 season, with the Trail Blazers providing the games to cable providers at no extra cost to the customers.

In the 2001–02 season, the team established its own regional sports network, Action Sports Cable Network (ASCN), which would carry the majority of Trail Blazers telecasts. AT&T Broadband refused to add the new channel due to the carriage fees it charged, which prevented it from reaching a wide audience. After having to resort to providing closed circuit feeds directly to bars, and sublicensing a package of games to the local PAX TV station, ASCN folded after one season. The team reached agreements with FSN Northwest (now Root Sports Northwest) and KGW to carry its regional broadcasts. It was alleged that the 2005 departure of Steve Jones from the commentary team was due in part to team displeasure with Jones' sometimes frank analysis of the team's on-court performance and off-court decisions.

In the 2007–08 season, the team moved to Comcast SportsNet Northwest (now NBC Sports Northwest); all but six regular season games were carried on CSN Northwest or the Blazers Television Network (a syndication package within the team's television market, whose flagship was KGW); 34 games were produced and broadcast in high-definition. The team's television contract with CSN Northwest was criticized due to the channel's lack of carriage on satellite television providers DirecTV and Dish Network, both of which compete with Comcast's cable television operations.

On July 6, 2016, the team renewed its contract with CSN Northwest through the 2020–2021 season, giving the network exclusive rights to all Trail Blazers games beginning in the 2017–18 season (and thus ending the team's over-the-air syndication package). The team had originally considered an arrangement with KPTV, under which games would be broadcast over-the-air and simulcast via an Internet service, but deals with potential streaming partners fell through. Root Sports Northwest made a higher-value, long-term offer, but the offer was rejected because Root Sports could not guarantee whether its carriage deal with Comcast Cable, which serves 55% of the Portland market, would be renewed. On November 2, 2017, NBC Sports Northwest launched a paid over-the-top service, Blazers Plus, offering access to 15 games through the remainder of the season.

On June 16, 2016, The Oregonian reported that Barrett, Rice, and analyst Antonio Harvey had been released by the Trail Blazers. Wheeler will call games on radio alone, while the three former personalities still received pay for the final season of their contracts. The change came as part of a plan by the team to overhaul its telecasts as it enters the final year of its current television deal with CSN Northwest. The next day, the team announced that veteran sportscaster Kevin Calabro would become its new lead commentator beginning in the 2016–17 season. On July 1, 2020, Kevin Calabro announced his departure as TV play-by-play broadcaster. Jordan Kent, the main host for the Blazers TV studio show, was named interim TV play-by-play broadcaster and in November 2020 was named the full-time TV play-by-play broadcaster starting with the 2020–2021 season. However, Calabro resumed calling Trail Blazers games after an absence of only one season. Calabro's current partners are color commentator Lamar Hurd, and sideline reporter Brooke Olzendam.

Prior to the 2021–22 season, the Trail Blazers announced that they would return to Root Sports Northwest under a multi-year deal of undisclosed length. A key factor in the deal was reported to be the network's wider carriage over NBC Sports Northwest, which included greater coverage on streaming and satellite providers (including DirecTV and Dish Network, although the latter's contract with Root Sports and several other AT&T SportsNet channels expired at the end of September 2021, with no renewal). The Trail Blazers announced they would leave Root Sports Northwest on August 14, 2024; no details on a replacement broadcaster were announced at that time.

On September 23, 2024, the Trail Blazers announced an agreement with the Sinclair Broadcast Group to launch Rip City Television Network, which will syndicate games over-the-air to KATU-DT2 in Portland, Oregon, KUNS-DT2 in Seattle, Washington, KTVL-DT4 in Medford, Oregon, KVAL-DT2 in Eugene, Oregon, KCBY-DT2 in Coos Bay, Oregon, KPIC-DT2 in Roseburg, Oregon, KIMA-DT3 in Yakima, Washington and KEPR-DT3 in Pasco, Washington. In Portland, games moved to KUNP/KATU-DT2 on January 1, 2025. The Blazers also relaunched BlazerVision, but as a direct-to-consumer streaming service rather than a pay-per-view service. KSTW in Seattle was announced as an additional partner on November 25, 2025.

=== Radio ===
All Trail Blazers' games are broadcast over the radio, with broadcasting carried on the Trail Blazers radio network, which consists of 25 stations located in the Pacific Northwest. The flagship station of the Blazers' radio network is 620 KPOJ in Portland. The radio broadcasting team consists of play-by-play announcer Travis Demers and studio host Jay Allen. All games are preceded by a pre-game analysis show, Blazers Courtside, and followed by a post-game show known as The 5th Quarter. Bob Akamian served as studio host until halfway through the 2010–2011 season, when the team hired away Adam Bjaranson from their over-the-air TV partner, KGW, and former Trail Blazers' player Michael Holton is the studio analyst. The original radio announcer for the team was Bill Schonely, who served as the team's radio play-by-play announcer from 1970 until 1992 and from 1994 until his retirement (he did Trail Blazers TV games with Jones from 1992 to 1994) in 1998—calling 2,522 Blazers games—and remained with the team as a community ambassador. Brian Wheeler then did play-by-play from 1998 to 2019.

=== Press relations ===
Several local news outlets provide in-depth coverage of the Trail Blazers. Chief among them is The Oregonian, the largest paper in the state of Oregon. Other newspapers providing detailed coverage of the team (including the assignment of beat writers to cover the team) include the Portland Tribune, a weekly Portland paper, and the Vancouver, Washington Columbian. Notable local journalists to cover the team include John Canzano of the Oregonian, Jason Quick of The Athletic, and Dwight Jaynes of the Portland Tribune. Online coverage of the Oregonian is provided through OregonLive.com, a website collaboration between the paper and Advance Internet. In addition to making Oregonian content available, oregonlive.com hosts several blogs covering the team written by Oregonian journalists, as well as an additional blog, "Blazers Blog", written by Sean Meagher.

Relations between the team and The Oregonian have often been tense; the paper is editorially independent of the team and is often critical. During the Steve Patterson era, relations between the two institutions became increasingly hostile; several NBA executives told ESPN's Chris Sheridan that the situation was the "most dysfunctional media-team relationship" that they could recall. For instance during a portion of a pre-2006 NBA draft workout, which was closed to the media, an Oregonian reporter looked through a curtain separating the press from the workout and wrote about this on his blog. Outraged, the team closed subsequent practices to the press altogether, leading John Canzano of the paper to respond with outrage on his blog. In November 2006, the Oregonian commissioned an outside editor to investigate the deteriorating relationship, a move the rival Willamette Week called "unusual". In the report, both sides were criticized somewhat, but did not make any revelations which were unexpected.

Additional coverage is offered by various blogs, including Blazers Edge (part of SB Nation) and the Portland Roundball Society (part of ESPN's TrueHoop Network).

== See also ==
- 1970 NBA expansion draft
- Bulls vs. Blazers and the NBA Playoffs
- List of Portland Trail Blazers accomplishments and records
- List of Portland Trail Blazers head coaches
- List of Portland Trail Blazers seasons
- Memorial Day Miracle
- Portland Fire
- Portland Trail Blazers draft history
- Sports in Portland, Oregon
- SuperSonics–Trail Blazers rivalry

Preceded by Boston Celtics	NBA champions 1976–77	Succeeded by Washington Bullets
