= Mike Barrett (sportscaster) =

American sports announcer

Mike Barrett (left) with his longtime television broadcast partner with the Portland Trail Blazers, Mike Rice

Mike Barrett (born 1968), also known as "MB", is a former television play-by-play announcer for the Portland Trail Blazers of the National Basketball Association, the Portland Thunder of the Arena Football League, and the Portland Fire of the WNBA. Barrett was the television voice of the Trail Blazers from 2003 to 2016.

== Biography ==
=== Early years ===
Mike Barrett was born in 1968 in Idaho, the son of a high school basketball coach, Duane Barrett. He grew up as a fan of the only professional major league team in his home state of Oregon, the Portland Trail Blazers, regularly attending games with his father.

Following his graduation from West Albany High School, Barrett attended Oregon State University (OSU), located about 10 miles away in neighboring Corvallis, Oregon. He graduated from OSU in 1991 with a degree in journalism.

=== Broadcasting career ===
Mike Barrett interviews Blazer Center Joel Przybilla in Portland at the time of his 2006 free agent signing.

After graduating from Oregon State University, Barrett went to work for radio station KUIK-AM 1360 in Hillsboro calling high school basketball games. He became sports director at KXL-AM 750 in Portland, then the flagship station of the Trail Blazers, in 1992. While at KXL Barrett anchored the station's morning and afternoon sportscasts as well as working as a sideline reporter for University of Oregon football broadcasts.

In 1999, he was hired by the Portland Trail Blazers as radio studio host and editor of the Blazers' official magazine, Rip City Magazine. The next year, he went to work as a radio and television play-by-play announcer for the WNBA's Portland Fire, a role which he continued until the team disbanded in 2003.

Barrett was named the play-by-play announcer for the Trail Blazers for the 2003–04 season, working for the first two years next to Steve "Snapper" Jones. From the 2005–06 season he was joined by analyst Mike Rice on Blazers' telecasts, an assignment which often caused him to assume the role of straight man for his loquacious and unrestrained broadcast partner. Barrett has said of his partner:

"Rice is good, he's a character, and you strip away some of that cartoon character, and I'm so lucky to work with him. I think his calls are probably as memorable as anything I say. I like to give him that room. Some of the traditional broadcasters really want their own space, who get upset when their analyst gets in and steps on their call. I'm not into that. I want to be there to fill in the blanks and to provide some information and entertainment."

In addition to calling the play-by-play, Barrett and Rice frequently appeared on a weekly radio and television show, Trail Blazers Courtside.

Barrett also wrote voluminously for his blog on the Blazers' website, offering game reviews and a behind-the-scenes perspective on the team. Barrett recalled the origins of his on-line publication in a 2008 interview:

"The funny thing is that when the blog started at Summer League like 3 or 4 years ago, they said write some stuff for training camp, and that was kind of strange, but then they saw I could write in a real conversational way, that involved people. It was one of those odd things that you stumble into and all of a sudden you've created a lot of work for yourself. It's not a bad thing it's a good thing.

"It takes a lot of time, as you know. To do something like that and to maintain it — I moderate 95% of the comments, I see them all, I put the picture up, I do the headline, it's like my own little newspaper. And that's pretty cool for somebody who was into journalism anyway. Writing has always been pretty easy. To sit down to write after a game or after an event, positive or negative news, it's almost my way of going home and unwinding and reliving it. I think a lot of writers would say that. That's my way of going home and coming down from the high of the night.

"I get wordy, I get long, I start writing. They tell me, 'just write a paragraph,' and I said, 'I get going, I can't.' The next thing I know I'm at 2,000 words. I've enjoyed sitting down after my kids and wife go to bed, sit down, and process through some things. It helps me remember the game better, it helps me realize it, the next time we play somebody, I remember not only the game but the blog. I can go back and review it if I want to."

=== Family ===
Mike Barrett lives with his wife, Shelly, in Wilsonville, Oregon. The couple have two children, a son named Jack and a daughter named Gabby.
