= Mike Rice (basketball) =

American basketball coach and broadcaster

Career information
- College: Duquesne (1960–1962)
- NBA draft: 1962: 8th round, 64th overall pick
- Drafted by: Detroit Pistons

Career history

Coaching
- 1977–1978: Duquesne (assistant)
- 1978–1982: Duquesne
- 1982–1987: Youngstown State
- 1988: Youngstown Pride

Career highlights
- 2x EAA regular season champion (1980, 1981); 2x EAA Coach of the Year (1980, 1981)
- Stats at Basketball Reference

Michael Thomas Rice Sr. is a former National Basketball Association color commentator, one half of the Portland Trail Blazers' television broadcasting team. A former player and coach, he is the only broadcaster ejected from an NBA game.

== Biography ==
=== Playing career ===
A basketball player at Duquesne University, Rice earned an All-American honorable mention selection his senior year, leading his Dukes to the 1962 NIT tournament. During the semi-final of the NIT, Duquesne lost to the St. John's Red Storm. During the game, Rice became involved in a fight with St. John's player Donnie Burks that lasted at least a minute. It was ultimately broken up by the New York City Police Department, who stepped in when members of the Madison Square Garden crowd tried to join the fight. No one was injured and referees did not call fouls on either Rice or Burks. The Associated Press described the event as a "lively brawl".

Although the NBA was calling and the Detroit Pistons selected him in the eighth round of the 1962 NBA draft, Rice decided that his skills could be better utilized from an educational standpoint and opted for a career in coaching.

=== Coaching career ===
Rice coached for 13 years at the high school level, posting a career record of 245–71, before moving to college coaching in 1977 when he accepted a position as an assistant coach at Duquesne. He was named the head coach of Duquesne for the 1978–79 season and over his four-year tenure he amassed a record of 62–49, garnering two berths in the National Invitation Tournament and twice being named Eastern Eight Coach of the Year.

Rice then moved to Youngstown State University, where he coached for five years, from 1982–83 through 1986–87. During this period the Penguins twice finished second in the Ohio Valley Conference, peaking with a high of 19 victories in the 1984–85 season. The team amassed 75 wins against 67 losses during the Mike Rice years.

During his final season at Youngstown State, Rice was instrumental in reviving the Greater YSU Holiday Classic basketball tournament, an event which continued annually through the 1991–92 season.

=== Broadcasting career ===
Mike Rice (R) with his longtime television broadcast partner with the Portland Trail Blazers, Mike Barrett.

After his dismissal at Youngstown State in March 1987, Rice looked for work outside of basketball. He was hired as the vice president of sales and marketing for David Zarzmer Industries, a Youngstown-based manufacturers' representative firm.

Rice moved from coaching to broadcasting for the 1987–88 season when he took a job working for ESPN as a college basketball analyst. Rice worked games as primary analyst for the Western Athletic Conference. From 1989 he also worked with SportsChannel America as its primary analyst for World Basketball League broadcasts.

Rice moved to the team-owned broadcasting operations of the Portland Trail Blazers in 1991. Rice was chosen by longtime voice of the Blazers Bill Schonely following a four-person tryout at the Blazers' 1991 Slam 'n' Jam held at Civic Stadium, organized by Blazer team president Marshall Glickman. Rice bested former Oregon State University guard Mark Radford, ex-Blazers assistant coach Jack McKinney, and retired NBA referee Earl Strom in the tryout, which gave each a quarter of the game to work alongside Schonely.

While Rice started as part of the radio team, since the 2006–07 season he has worked with play-by-play announcer Mike Barrett providing color commentary for the television broadcast.

Known affectionately as "The Wild One", Rice has been referred to by journalist Kerry Eggers as "part basketball expert, part entertainer, 100 percent character." Echoing these sentiments, Blazer television producer Scott Zachary has likened him to a "favorite uncle" and publicly pronounced him "a goofy dude."

Rice himself acknowledges a propensity for blurting out sentiments that more circumspect announcers would tend to internally filter. "I don’t give a damn about a lot of things. Later on, I think back, 'Now why’d I do that?'" he has said. This tendency to be what former broadcast partner Eddie Doucette has characterized as a "loose cannon," combined with his unabashed "homerism", has made Rice a figure of some controversy.

Rice's outspoken demeanor resulted in one of the events for which he is best known, his 1994 ejection from an NBA game while working a radio broadcast. As Rice tells the story:

"At the time, Steve Javie, the official, was a young official. That previous week he had kicked out a mascot, a fan, and kicked somebody else out, a trainer or something like that. He was on a roll that week, he had made a call, and I looked on the monitor and saw it was a bad call on Cliff Robinson. I kind of put my hands like that [two hands waved at the official] and he ran over. Cliff thought he was going to call a technical on him, because Cliff was standing there doing the same thing. He ran by Cliff and that's when he kicked me out of the game — the rest is history."

Rice added that he subsequently wrote an article for Rip City magazine charging Javie with an abuse of power. "I think he...read that and we have not talked since", he noted in a 2009 interview.

=== Family and hobbies ===
Rice's wife Kathy is a former Duquesne basketball player. The couple have two daughters, Susan and Stephanie, both graduates of Syracuse University, and a son, Mike Rice, Jr., who was the head basketball coach at Robert Morris University before moving to the same position at Rutgers University in May 2010. Mike Rice, Jr. was fired by Rutgers on April 3, 2013.

Despite nine surgeries on his right knee, Mike Rice, Sr. remains an avid golfer, sporting a 6 handicap. He frequently brought his golf clubs when he traveled with the team and plays whenever possible. He also plays tennis several times a week.

== Head coaching record ==
Record table
Season	Team	Overall	Conference	Standing	Postseason
Duquesne Dukes (Eastern Athletic Association) (1978–1982)
1978–79	Duquesne	13–13	2–8	7th	
1979–80	Duquesne	18–10	7–3	T–1st	NIT Second Round
1980–81	Duquesne	20–10	10–3	T–1st	NIT First Round
1981–82	Duquesne	11–16	5–9	T–6th	
Duquesne:		62–49 (.559)	24–23 (.511)		
Youngstown State Penguins (Ohio Valley Conference) (1982–1987)
1982–83	Youngstown State	15–12	5–9	6th	
1983–84	Youngstown State	18–11	9–5	3rd	
1984–85	Youngstown State	19–11	9–5	T–2nd	
1985–86	Youngstown State	12–16	8–6	T–3rd	
1986–87	Youngstown State	11–17	4–10	7th	
Youngstown State:		75–67 (.528)	35–35 (.500)		
Total:		137–116 (.542)			
National champion Postseason invitational champion Conference regular season champion Conference regular season and conference tournament champion Division regular season champion Division regular season and conference tournament champion Conference tournament champion
