= 1970 NBA expansion draft =

5th NBA expansion draft

General information
- Sport: Basketball
- Date: May 11, 1970

Overview
- League: NBA
- Expansion teams: Buffalo Braves; Cleveland Cavaliers; Portland Trail Blazers

The 1970 NBA expansion draft was the fifth expansion draft of the National Basketball Association (NBA). (Note: The previous expansion drafts took place in 1961, 1966, 1967, and 1968.) The draft was held on May 11, 1970, so that the newly founded Buffalo Braves, Cleveland Cavaliers, and Portland Trail Blazers could acquire players for the 1970–71 season. Buffalo, Cleveland, and Portland were awarded the expansion teams on February 6, 1970. Houston was also awarded a franchise, but the group backing the team was unable to come up with the US$750,000 down payment on the US$3.7 million entrance fee that was required before the 1970 NBA draft. The Braves later underwent two relocations, moving to San Diego in 1978 and changing their name from the Braves to the Clippers, and then relocating to Los Angeles in 1984. They are currently known as the Los Angeles Clippers.

In an NBA expansion draft, new NBA teams are allowed to acquire players from the previously established teams in the league. Not all players on a given team are available during an expansion draft, since each team can protect a certain number of players from being selected. In this draft, each of the other fourteen NBA teams protected seven players from their roster. After each round, after all of the expansion teams had selected one player, each of the existing teams added another player to their protected list. In the first round, the Braves had the first pick, while the Blazers and the Cavaliers had the second and the third picks respectively. In the subsequent rounds, the Braves and the Cavaliers exchanged their order of selection, while the Blazers had the second pick throughout the draft. The draft continued until all three teams had selected eleven unprotected players each, while the existing teams had lost two or three players each.

The Buffalo Braves were formed and owned by local businessman Paul Snyder. He hired former Philadelphia 76ers head coach and 1966 Coach of the Year Dolph Schayes as the franchise's first head coach. The Braves' selections included six-time All-Star Bailey Howell. Howell was immediately traded to the 76ers, however, in exchange for Bob Kauffman and a future second-round pick. Nine players from the draft joined the Braves for their inaugural season, but only three played more than one season for the team.

The Cleveland Cavaliers were formed and owned by businessman Nick Mileti. He hired former college basketball coach Bill Fitch as the franchise's first head coach. The Cavaliers' selections included five-time All-Star Don Ohl and one-time All-Star Len Chappell. Ohl retired from playing prior to the start of the season, however, and Chappell only played briefly before he was waived. Eight players from the draft joined the Cavaliers for their inaugural season, but only four played more than one season for the team. Butch Beard was the ninth player from the expansion draft to play for the Cavaliers. He joined the team for the 1971–72 season after serving for a year in the military. Bingo Smith played nine and a half seasons with the Cavaliers before he was traded to the San Diego Clippers in 1979. He was the franchise's leader in games played when he left, a record that stood until 2000 when Danny Ferry broke it.

The Portland Trail Blazers were formed by Harry Glickman, who created the franchise through the financiers turned co-owners Larry Weinberg, Herman Sarkowsky and Robert Shmertz. They hired former college basketball coach Rolland Todd as the franchise's first head coach. The Blazers' selections included former first overall pick Fred Hetzel and former third pick Larry Siegfried. Hetzel was waived without playing a game for the Blazers, however, and Siegfried was immediately traded to the San Diego Rockets in exchange for Jim Barnett. Six players from the draft joined the Blazers for their inaugural season, but only three played more than one season for the team. The Blazers also selected Pat Riley, who never played for the team, but went on to have a Hall of Fame coaching career, enshrined in 2008.

== Selections ==
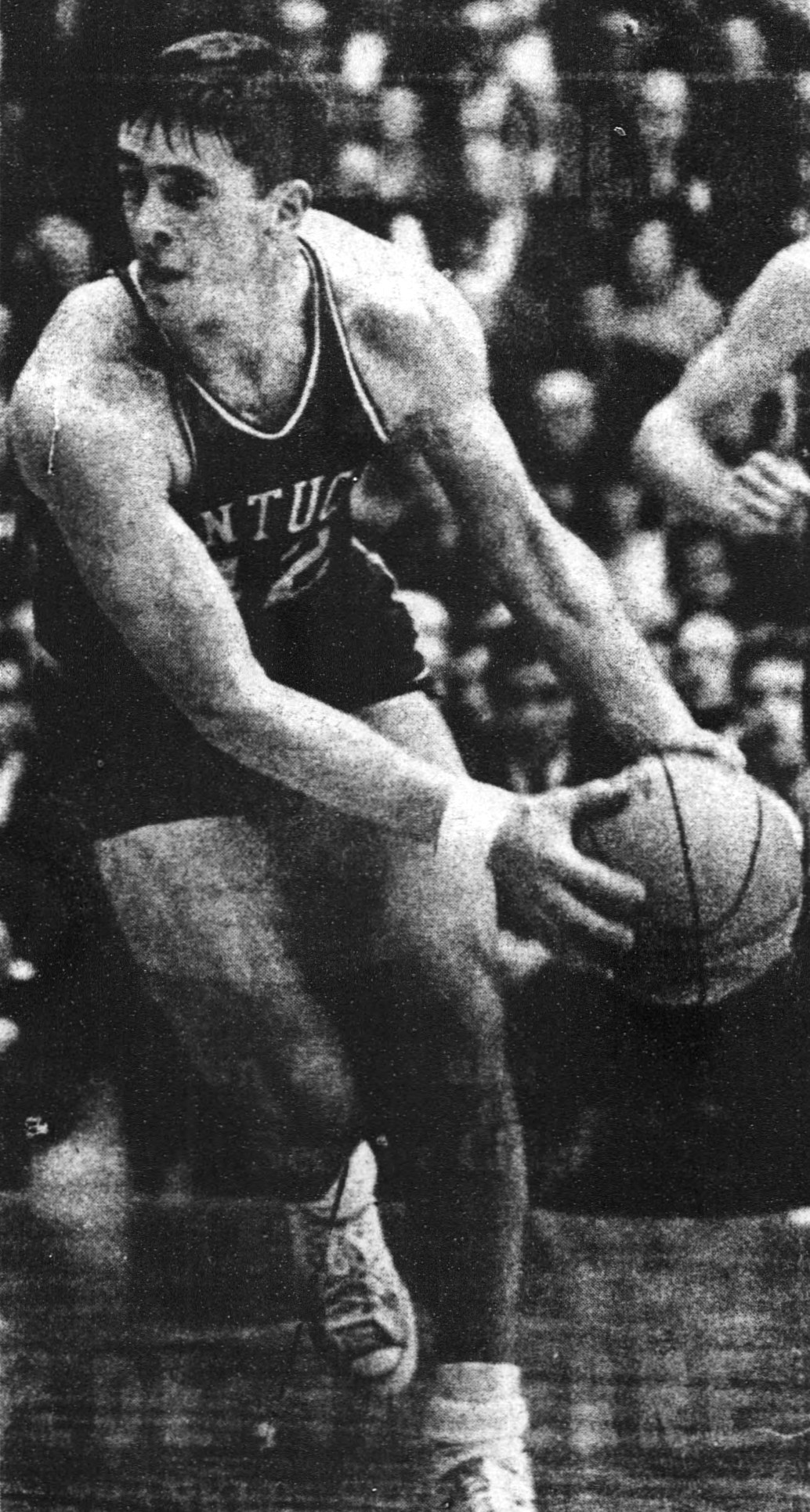
Pat Riley was selected by the Portland Trail Blazers from the San Diego Rockets.

Key
Abbreviation	Position
G	Guard
F	Forward
C	Center

^	Denotes player who has been inducted to the Naismith Memorial Basketball Hall of Fame
^{+}	Denotes player who has been selected for at least one All-Star Game

Draft selections
Player	Position	Nationality	Team	Prev. Team	Years in NBA (Note: Number of years played in the NBA prior to the draft)	Career with franchise (Note: Career with the expansion franchise that drafted the player)	Ref.
Em Bryant	G	United States	Buffalo Braves	Boston Celtics	6	1970–1972	
Freddie Crawford	G/F	United States	Buffalo Braves	Milwaukee Bucks	4	1970	
Dick Garrett	G	United States	Buffalo Braves	Los Angeles Lakers	1	1970–1973	
Herm Gilliam	G/F	United States	Buffalo Braves	Cincinnati Royals	1	1970–1971	
Bill Hosket	F/C	United States	Buffalo Braves	New York Knicks	2	1970–1972	
Bailey Howell^	F	United States	Buffalo Braves	Boston Celtics	11	— (Note: Never played a game for the franchise)	
Paul Long	G	United States	Buffalo Braves	Detroit Pistons	2	1970–1971	
Mike Lynn	F	United States	Buffalo Braves	Los Angeles Lakers	1	1970	
Don May	F	United States	Buffalo Braves	New York Knicks	2	1970–1971	
Ray Scott	F/C	United States	Buffalo Braves	Baltimore Bullets	9	—	
George Wilson	C	United States	Buffalo Braves	Philadelphia 76ers	6	1970–1971	
Butch Beard^{+}	G	United States	Cleveland Cavaliers	Atlanta Hawks	1	1971–1972; 1975	
Len Chappell^{+}	F/C	United States	Cleveland Cavaliers	Milwaukee Bucks	8	1970	
Johnny Egan	G	United States	Cleveland Cavaliers	Los Angeles Lakers	9	1970	
Bob Lewis	G	United States	Cleveland Cavaliers	San Francisco Warriors	3	1970–1971	
McCoy McLemore	F/C	United States	Cleveland Cavaliers	Detroit Pistons	6	1970–1971	
Don Ohl^{+}	G	United States	Cleveland Cavaliers	Atlanta Hawks	10	—	
Loy Petersen	G	United States	Cleveland Cavaliers	Chicago Bulls	2	—	
Luther Rackley	C	United States	Cleveland Cavaliers	Cincinnati Royals	1	1970–1971	
Bingo Smith	G/F	United States	Cleveland Cavaliers	San Diego Rockets	1	1970–1979	
John Warren	G/F	United States	Cleveland Cavaliers	New York Knicks	1	1970–1974	
Walt Wesley	C	United States	Cleveland Cavaliers	Chicago Bulls	4	1970–1972	
Rick Adelman	G	United States	Portland Trail Blazers	San Diego Rockets	2	1970–1973	
Jerry Chambers	F	United States	Portland Trail Blazers	Phoenix Suns	2	—	
LeRoy Ellis	F/C	United States	Portland Trail Blazers	Baltimore Bullets	8	1970–1971	
Fred Hetzel	F/C	United States	Portland Trail Blazers	Philadelphia 76ers	5	—	
Joe Kennedy	F	United States	Portland Trail Blazers	Seattle SuperSonics	2	—	
Ed Manning	F	United States	Portland Trail Blazers	Chicago Bulls	3	1970–1971	
Stan McKenzie	G/F	United States	Portland Trail Blazers	Phoenix Suns	3	1970–1972	
Dorie Murrey	F/C	United States	Portland Trail Blazers	Seattle SuperSonics	4	1970	
Pat Riley	G/F	United States	Portland Trail Blazers	San Diego Rockets	3	—	
Dale Schlueter	C	United States	Portland Trail Blazers	San Francisco Warriors	2	1970–1972; 1977–1978	
Larry Siegfried	F	United States	Portland Trail Blazers	Boston Celtics	7	—	
