= R24 =

R24 or R-24 may refer to:

== Roads ==
- R-24 regional road (Montenegro)
- R24 (South Africa)

== Other uses ==
- R-24 (missile), a Soviet air-to-air missile
- GER Class R24, a steam locomotive
- Ngandyera language
- R24: Toxic in contact with skin, a risk phrase
- R-24 Würzburg, a former military airfield in Germany
- Renault R24, a Formula One car
- Rubik R-24 Bibic, a Hungarian training glider
- Small nucleolar RNA R24
- USS R-24 (SS-101), a submarine of the United States Navy
