= Würzburg American High School =

Würzburg American High School (WAHS)
- Leighton Barracks; Würzburg; Germany

Information
- School type: Department of Defense Dependents Schools
- Established: 1954
- Status: Closed
- Closed: 2008
- CEEB code: 576400
- Grades: 7-12
- Colors: Purple and white
- Mascot: Wolves
- Newspaper: The Full Moon
- Yearbook: Erinnerung ('55 - '60), Die Giestalten ('61), Ambassador ('62 - '73), Desiderata ('74 - '83), The Lair
- Website: https://www.wolfpack.online

Würzburg American High School (or WAHS) was located in Würzburg, Germany on Leighton Barracks. The school opened in 1954. The school was part of the U.S. Department of Defense Dependent School system. It was a medium-sized school: in 1964 the senior class comprised about 42 students. With the closure of Leighton Barracks in 2008 and the departure of most units from the area, the senior class in 2007 was much smaller, and the school closed in 2008.

The school consisted mostly of U.S. military dependents and children of the teachers.

== Military communities served ==
- Kitzingen
- Würzburg
- Giebelstadt
- Schweinfurt
- Bad Kissingen
- Wertheim
- Wildflecken

== Notable alumni ==
- Anthony Brown - Former NFL player
- Mike Brown - Head coach of the New York Knicks of the NBA
