= Anthony Brown (offensive lineman) =

American football player (born 1972)

No. 75, 60
- Position: Tackle / Guard

Personal information
- Born: November 6, 1972 (age 54); Okinawa, Japan
- Listed height: 6 ft 5 in (1.96 m)
- Listed weight: 315 lb (143 kg)

Career information
- High school: Würzburg American (Würzburg, Germany)
- College: Utah (1991–1994)
- NFL draft: 1995: undrafted

Career history
- Cincinnati Bengals (1995–1998); Pittsburgh Steelers (1999)

Awards and highlights
- Third-team All-American (1994); Second-team All-WAC (1993)

Career NFL statistics
- Games played: 52
- Games started: 17
- Stats at Pro Football Reference

Anthony Quantrell Brown (born November 6, 1972) is an American former professional football player who was an offensive lineman for five seasons in the National Football League (NFL) with the Cincinnati Bengals and Pittsburgh Steelers. He played college football for the Utah Utes.

== Early life and college ==
Brown grew up as a military brat. He was born on November 6, 1972, in Okinawa, Japan. He attended Würzburg American High School in Würzburg, Germany.

He was a member of the Utah Utes from 1991 to 1992 and a two-year letterman from 1993 to 1994. He was named a third-team All-American by the Associated Press in 1994.

== Professional career ==
After going undrafted in the 1995 NFL draft, Brown signed with the Cincinnati Bengals on April 26. He played in seven games, starting one, for the Bengals during his rookie year in 1995. He appeared in seven games in 1996 and six games in 1997. He became a free agent after the 1997 season and re-signed with the team on February 13, 1998. Brown played in all 16 games, starting five, for the Bengals in 1998. He became a free agent again after the 1998 season.

Brown was signed by the Pittsburgh Steelers on April 23, 1999. He appeared in 16 games, starting 11, in 1999. He was released by the Steelers on August 27, 2000.

== Personal life ==
Brown's older brother Mike Brown is the head coach of the New York Knicks in the NBA, and won a championship with the Knicks in 2026.

He has spent time working in real estate after his NFL career.
