= Mike Brown (basketball, born 1970) =

American basketball coach (born 1970)

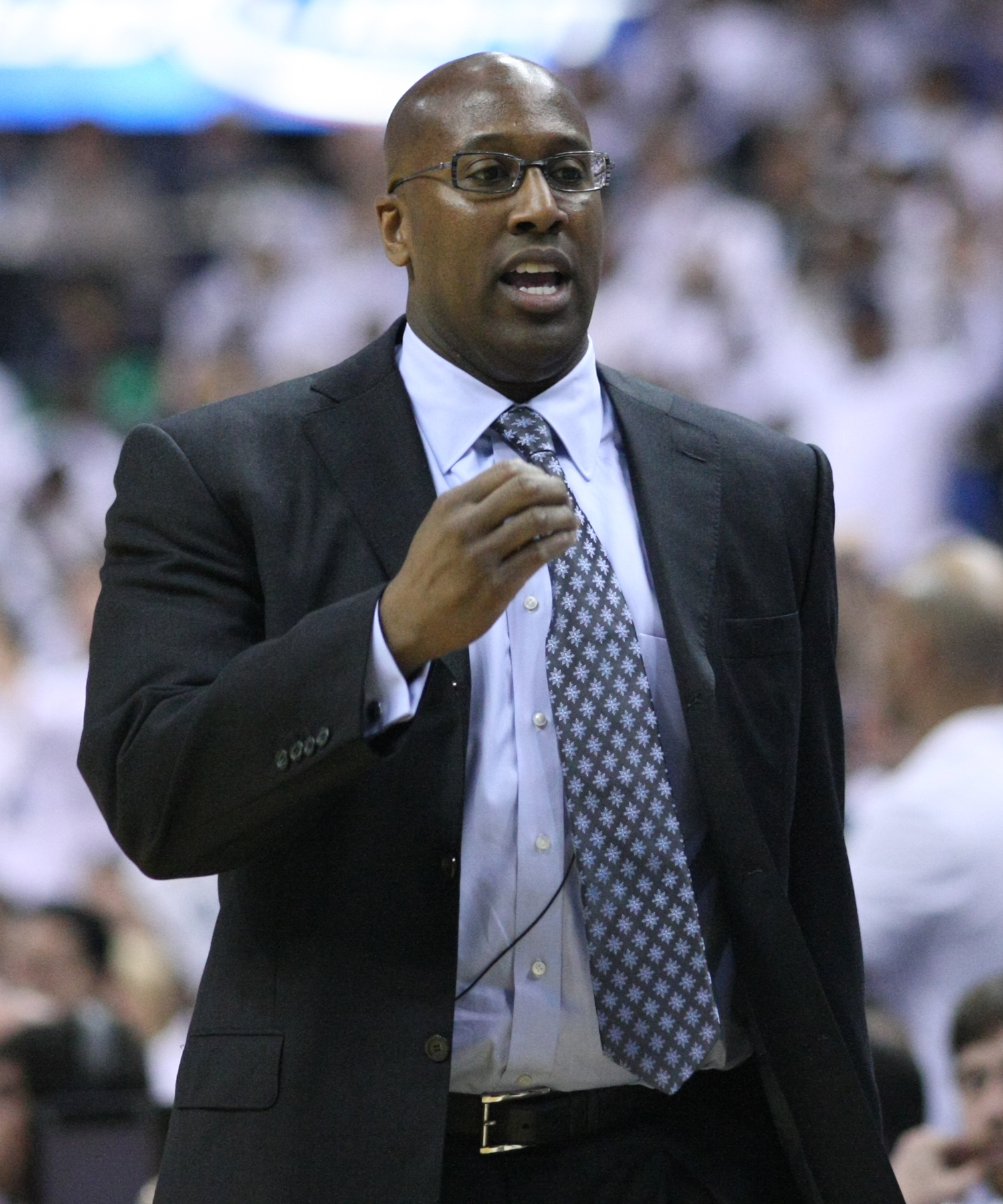
- Brown with the Cleveland Cavaliers in 2008

New York Knicks
- Title: Head coach
- League: NBA

Personal information
- Born: March 5, 1970 (age 56) Columbus, Ohio, U.S.
- Listed height: 6 ft 3 in (1.91 m)
- Listed weight: 200 lb (91 kg)

Career information
- High school: Würzburg American (Würzburg, Germany)
- College: Mesa CC (1988–1990); San Diego (1990–1992)
- NBA draft: 1992: undrafted
- Position: Guard
- Coaching career: 1997–present

Career history

Coaching
- 1997–1999: Washington Wizards (assistant)
- 2000–2003: San Antonio Spurs (assistant)
- 2003–2005: Indiana Pacers (assistant)
- 2005–2010: Cleveland Cavaliers
- 2011–2012: Los Angeles Lakers
- 2013–2014: Cleveland Cavaliers
- 2016–2022: Golden State Warriors (associate HC)
- 2022–2024: Sacramento Kings
- 2025–present: New York Knicks

Career highlights
- As head coach: NBA champion (2026); NBA Cup champion (2025); 2× NBA Coach of the Year (2009, 2023); NBCA Coach of the Year (2023); NBA All-Star Game head coach (2009); As assistant coach: 4× NBA champion (2003, 2017, 2018, 2022)

Michael Burton Brown (born March 5, 1970) is an American basketball coach who is the head coach of the New York Knicks of the National Basketball Association (NBA). He was previously the head coach of the Sacramento Kings, Cleveland Cavaliers, and Los Angeles Lakers, as well as an assistant coach for the Golden State Warriors and San Antonio Spurs. Brown also served as the head coach of the Nigeria men's national team from 2020 until 2022, coaching the team at the 2020 Summer Olympics.

Brown began coaching the Cavaliers in 2005. The team reached the 2007 NBA Finals, where they were swept by the San Antonio Spurs. Brown was honored as NBA Coach of the Year for leading the Cavaliers to a team-record and league-best 66 wins in 2009. The following year, they won 61 games, again a league-best. However, after losing to the Boston Celtics in the 2010 Eastern Conference semifinals, Brown was fired. He succeeded Phil Jackson as the head coach of the Lakers in 2011 before being dismissed five games into the 2012–13 season. Brown returned to the Cavaliers in 2013, but was fired after one season. He then joined the Warriors as associate head coach in 2016; the team went on to defeat the Cavaliers in 2017 and 2018, and the Boston Celtics in 2022 for the NBA championship.

Brown departed from the Warriors in 2022 to become the head coach of the Kings. In his first year as head coach, Brown led the Kings to their first playoff appearance in 17 years, snapping the longest playoff drought in NBA history. For his efforts, Brown became the first-ever unanimous NBA Coach of the Year award winner and was named to the NBCA Coach of the Year award in 2023. After a 13–18 start to the 2024–25 season, Brown was dismissed by the Kings. The following year, he became the head coach of the Knicks and led the team to their first championship in 53 years.

== Early life and career ==
Brown was born on March 5, 1970, in Columbus, Ohio, to a father who served in the US Air Force. He moved with his family to military bases, where his father was stationed and spent time in the United States, Japan, and Germany during his childhood. Brown graduated in 1988 from Würzburg American High School in Würzburg, Germany.

After studying and playing basketball for two years at Mesa Community College in Mesa, Arizona, Brown attended the University of San Diego (USD), where he played two seasons of college basketball for the San Diego Toreros. As a 6-foot-3-inch (1.91 m) guard, he had career averages of 8.2 points, 3.3 rebounds and 1.9 assists in 57 games under coach Hank Egan. He graduated in 1992 with a Bachelor of Business Administration degree.

Brown's first basketball job was as a video coordinator for the Denver Nuggets. He met his wife, Carolyn, a native of Colorado, at a bar in Denver.

== Coaching career ==
=== Washington Wizards (1997–1999) ===
In 1997, Brown moved to Washington for two seasons, working as an assistant coach under fellow USD alumnus Bernie Bickerstaff.

=== San Antonio Spurs (2000–2003) ===
In 2000, Brown was hired by Gregg Popovich as an assistant coach with the San Antonio Spurs, whose staff included his former college coach, Egan. Brown was also the head coach for the Spurs' summer league teams in Boston and Salt Lake City. The Spurs won an NBA championship in 2003 while Brown was on their coaching staff.

=== Indiana Pacers (2003–2005) ===
In 2003, Brown was hired as associate head coach under Rick Carlisle with the Indiana Pacers. He helped lead Indiana to consecutive playoff appearances, including a trip to the Eastern Conference finals in 2004. Brown followed Ron Artest into the stands and was instrumental in getting him back to the locker room during the massive brawl between the Pacers, Detroit Pistons, and Pistons fans at the Palace at Auburn Hills on November 19, 2004. Brown remained with the Pacers for two seasons.

=== Cleveland Cavaliers (2005–2010) ===
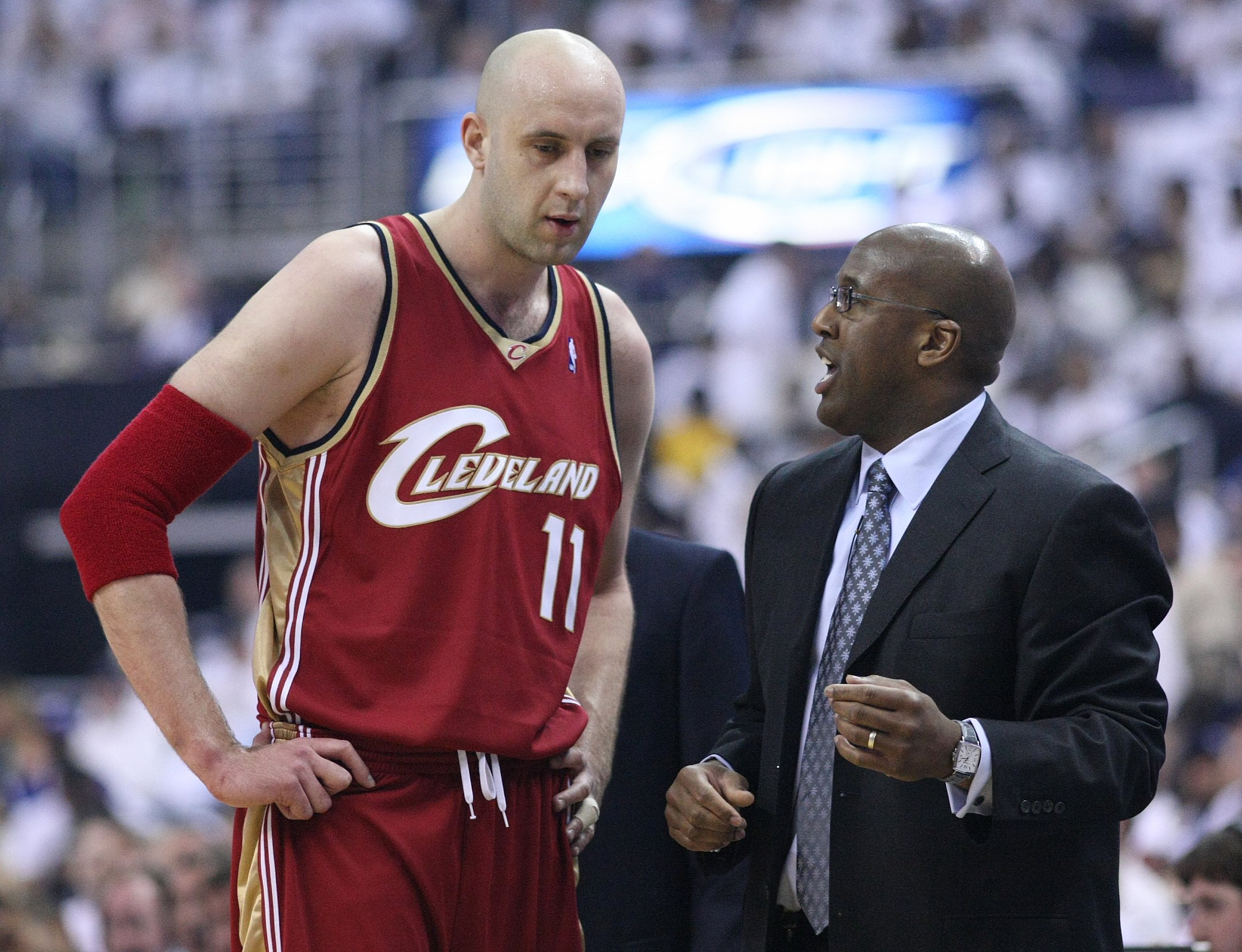
Brown with Zydrunas Ilgauskas, who he coached the entirety of his first stint in Cleveland

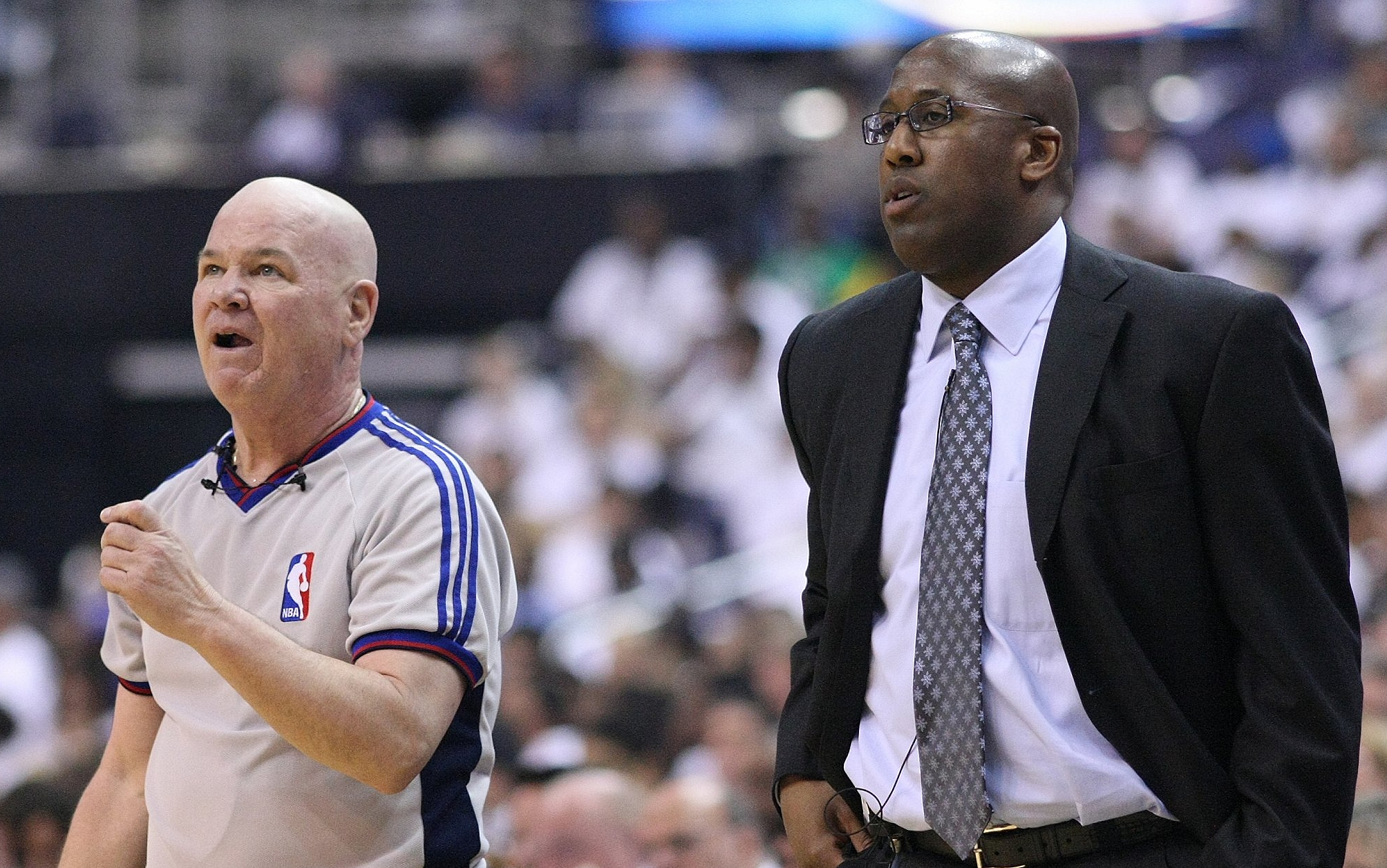
Brown with referee Joey Crawford, Brown was fined $25,000 for criticizing Crawford in 2009

In June 2005, Brown replaced Brendan Malone as head coach of the Cleveland Cavaliers. It was his first NBA head coaching position. Brown became the second-youngest coach in the league (trailing only Lawrence Frank). When he arrived in Cleveland, the Cavaliers had missed the playoffs in emerging superstar LeBron James's first two NBA seasons and had not made the playoffs since 1998. Under Brown, the team won 50 games, made the 2005–06 playoffs, and won their first-round series.

On June 2, 2007, the Cavaliers defeated the Detroit Pistons in the Eastern Conference finals and advanced to the NBA Finals for the first time in franchise history. However, they were swept in four games by his former team, the San Antonio Spurs.

On February 1, 2008, Brown was named the Eastern Conference Coach of the Month for January 2008. In 2009, Brown was named coach of the Eastern Conference All-Star team. On April 20, 2009, Brown was named NBA Coach of the Year after guiding the Cavaliers to a league-high and franchise-best 66–16 record.

Following a loss to the Indiana Pacers on February 10, 2009, Brown was fined $25,000 by the NBA for publicly criticizing referee Joey Crawford and the officiating after a controversial foul call in the game's final seconds.

The Cavaliers won a league-high 61 games in the 2009–10 season. However, the team was eliminated by the Boston Celtics in the Eastern Conference semifinals on May 13, 2010. With this loss, the Cavaliers became the first team in NBA history to win 60 games in back-to-back seasons without advancing to the NBA Finals.

Brown was fired on May 24, 2010 hours before his $4.5 m contract for the following year would have kicked in. It was widely thought that team owner Dan Gilbert made the move in order to increase the chances of luring LeBron James back to Cleveland. Various Cavaliers players as well as multiple rival league coaches criticized the move, praising Brown as a top head coach. Under Brown's leadership, the Cavaliers made it past the first round of the NBA playoffs for five consecutive seasons.

=== Los Angeles Lakers (2011–2012) ===
On May 25, 2011, Brown agreed to succeed Phil Jackson as head coach of the Los Angeles Lakers. He reportedly agreed to a three-year deal with a team option to renew his contract for a fourth year. Six days later, Brown was officially named the Lakers' new head coach. The 2011–12 season was shortened to 66 games by the lockout that season, and the Lakers were eliminated in the second round of the playoffs.

Before the 2012–13 season, Brown decided that the Lakers would use a version of the Princeton offense. Shortly afterward, the Lakers acquired All-Stars Steve Nash and Dwight Howard, giving them a starting lineup of five former All-Stars with a combined 33 All-Star game appearances (the other former All-Stars were Kobe Bryant, Pau Gasol, and Metta World Peace, respectively). Although immediately considered top title contenders, the Lakers struggled to adjust to the changes in both system and personnel and were winless in eight preseason games. The team's travails continued into the start of the regular season, with the team losing four of its first five games. Nash had played just 1 1/2 games due to injury, Howard was playing but recovering from back surgery, and Bryant had been playing with an injured foot and was unable to practice. On November 9, 2012, Brown was fired. The Lakers felt an urgency to win given their aging stars, Howard's pending free agency, and owner Jerry Buss's deteriorating health. Brown's dismissal after five games was the third-fastest coaching change in NBA history.

=== Return to Cleveland (2013–2014) ===
On April 24, 2013, Brown was rehired by the Cavaliers, replacing Byron Scott as head coach. Cavaliers owner Dan Gilbert admitted that his firing of Brown the first time was a "mistake". For the first time as a head coach, Brown's team posted a losing record over an 82-game season, as his team was hampered by injuries and reported infighting in the locker room.

On May 12, 2014, Brown was fired by Gilbert a second time.

=== Golden State Warriors (2016–2022) ===
On July 6, 2016, the Golden State Warriors hired Brown as an assistant coach; he replaced Luke Walton, who departed to be the head coach of the Los Angeles Lakers.

Brown served as acting head coach during periods in which head coach Steve Kerr was unable to do so due to chronic back pain. Brown led the Warriors to a 12–0 record in the 2016–17 NBA playoffs while Kerr was absent; the Warriors went on to win the championship in five games that year, defeating the Cleveland Cavaliers. The Warriors finished the playoffs with a 16–1 record, the best postseason winning percentage in NBA history.

The Warriors went back to the Finals in 2018 and defeated the Cavaliers in the Finals for the second straight year. During these two finals, Brown faced off against LeBron James, whom he had coached for five years in Cleveland.

On May 9, 2022, Brown was the Warriors' acting head coach for game 4 of the Western Conference semifinals against the Memphis Grizzlies after Kerr tested positive for COVID-19. The team won the game to take a 3–1 series lead. The Warriors made it to the 2022 NBA Finals where they defeated the Boston Celtics in six games to give Brown his fourth NBA championship as an assistant coach and third championship with the Warriors overall.

=== Sacramento Kings (2022–2024) ===
On May 9, 2022, Brown was named the head coach of the Sacramento Kings. In his inaugural season, Brown coached the Kings to a 48–34 record and the team's first playoff appearance since 2006. He was subsequently named NBA Coach of the Year for the 2022–23 season, receiving 100 votes and becoming the first coach in history to win the award by a unanimous vote.

On December 27, 2024, the Kings fired Brown after a 13–18 start to the 2024–25 season. The previous day, Sacramento fell at home to the Detroit Pistons despite holding a 10-point lead with under three minutes remaining in regulation.

=== New York Knicks (2025–present) ===
On July 7, 2025, the New York Knicks hired Brown as their new head coach. The 2025–26 Knicks went 53–29, the best record by a first-year coach in the franchise's history, including the in-season NBA Cup championship against the San Antonio Spurs. It was the most wins Brown had in a season since the 2009–10 season with Cleveland. The team advanced to the 2026 NBA Finals, also against the Spurs, to send Brown back to the championship round for the first time as a head coach since 2007. The 19-year gap between Finals appearances as a head coach set a new Finals record.

On June 13, 2026, the Knicks defeated the Spurs 94–90 in game 5 of the NBA Finals to clinch the series, marking Brown's first championship as an NBA head coach.

== National team career ==
On February 5, 2020, Brown was announced as the new head coach of Nigeria's men's national basketball team.

== Head coaching record ==
Legend
Regular season	G	Games coached	W	Games won	L	Games lost	W–L %	Win–loss %
Playoffs	PG	Playoff games	PW	Playoff wins	PL	Playoff losses	PW–L %	Playoff win–loss %

Team	Year	G	W	L	W–L%	Finish	PG	PW	PL	PW–L%	Result
Cleveland	2005–06	82	50	32	.610	2nd in Central	13	7	6	.538	Lost in conference semifinals
Cleveland	2006–07	82	50	32	.610	2nd in Central	20	12	8	.600	Lost in NBA Finals
Cleveland	2007–08	82	45	37	.549	2nd in Central	13	7	6	.538	Lost in conference semifinals
Cleveland	2008–09	82	66	16	.805	1st in Central	14	10	4	.714	Lost in conference finals
Cleveland	2009–10	82	61	21	.744	1st in Central	11	6	5	.545	Lost in conference semifinals
L.A. Lakers	2011–12	66	41	25	.621	1st in Pacific	12	5	7	.417	Lost in conference semifinals
L.A. Lakers	2012–13	5	1	4	.200	(fired)	—	—	—	—	—
Cleveland	2013–14	82	33	49	.402	3rd in Central	—	—	—	—	Missed playoffs
Sacramento	2022–23	82	48	34	.585	1st in Pacific	7	3	4	.429	Lost in first round
Sacramento	2023–24	82	46	36	.561	4th in Pacific	—	—	—	—	Missed playoffs
Sacramento	2024–25	31	13	18	.419	(fired)	—	—	—	—	—
New York	2025–26	82	53	29	.646	2nd in Atlantic	19	16	3	.842	Won NBA championship
Career		840	507	333	.604		109	66	43	.606	

== Personal life ==
Brown's younger brother, Anthony, played in the NFL.

Brown and his wife, Carolyn, have two sons – Elijah and Cameron. Brown's marriage to Carolyn ended in 2015. He is now married to Rochelle Ledesma.

Off-season, Brown resides in Albuquerque, NM. His son, Elijah, is a former basketball player for the UNM Lobos.
