= 1961 NBA expansion draft =

Inaugural expansion draft of the National Basketball Association (NBA)

General information
- Sport: Basketball
- Date: April 26, 1961

Overview
- League: NBA
- Expansion team: Chicago Packers

The 1961 NBA expansion draft was the inaugural expansion draft of the National Basketball Association (NBA). The draft was held on April 26, 1961, so that the newly founded Chicago Packers could acquire players for the upcoming 1961–62 season. The Packers were the second NBA team from Chicago, after the Chicago Stags, which folded in 1950. The Packers later underwent several name changes and relocations before moving to Washington, D.C.. They are currently known as the Washington Wizards. In an NBA expansion draft, new NBA teams are allowed to acquire players from the previously established teams in the league. Not all players on a given team are available during an expansion draft, since each team can protect a certain number of players from being selected.

The Packers appointed four-time All-Star and former Minneapolis Lakers head coach Jim Pollard as the franchise's first head coach. The Packers selected eight unprotected players, one from each of the other NBA teams. Their selections included former second overall pick Archie Dees from the Detroit Pistons. However, he and Barney Cable only played briefly for the Packers before he was traded to the St. Louis Hawks in exchange for former first overall pick Sihugo Green, one-time All-Star Woody Sauldsberry and Joe Graboski. Dave Budd, who was selected from the New York Knicks, was traded back to the Knicks without playing any games for the Packers. He was traded in exchange for former second overall pick Charlie Tyra and Bob McNeill. Six players from the expansion draft joined the Packers for their inaugural season, but only two played more than one season for the team. Bobby Leonard would later go on to become the team's head coach.

== Key ==
Pos.	G	F	C
Position	Guard	Forward	Center

== Selections ==
Player	Pos.	Nationality	Previous team	Years of NBA experience^{[a]}	Career with the franchise^{[b]}	Ref.
Dave Budd	F	United States	New York Knicks	1	—^{[c]}	
Barney Cable	F	United States	Syracuse Nationals	3	1961; 1963–1964	
Gene Conley	F/C	United States	Boston Celtics	4	—^{[c]}	
Ralph Davis	G	United States	Cincinnati Royals	1	1961–1962	
Archie Dees	F/C	United States	Detroit Pistons	3	1961	
Andy Johnson	G/F	United States	Philadelphia Warriors	3	1961–1962	
Bobby Leonard	G	United States	Los Angeles Lakers	5	1961–1963	
Dave Piontek	F/C	United States	St. Louis Hawks	5	1961–1962	

== Notes ==
- ^{a} Number of years played in the NBA prior to the draft
- ^{b} Includes career with the Chicago Zephyrs (1962–1963) and Baltimore Bullets (1963–1973)
- ^{c} Never played a game for the franchise
