= List of Washington Wizards head coaches =

The Washington Wizards are an American professional basketball team based in Washington, D.C. They are a member of the Southeast Division of the Eastern Conference in the National Basketball Association (NBA). The team plays its home games at the Capital One Arena (formerly the MCI Center and the Verizon Center). The franchise was established in Chicago, Illinois as the Chicago Packers in 1961; after one season, its name was changed to the Chicago Zephyrs. In 1963, the franchise moved to Baltimore, Maryland and was renamed the Baltimore Bullets. It moved to Landover, Maryland in 1973 and changed its name to the Capital Bullets. After one season, the team became the Washington Bullets. In 1978, the Bullets won the 1978 NBA Finals in seven games for the franchise's only championship. In 1997, the team became the Washington Wizards, which is the team's current name. Since their formation, the Wizards have won six divisional championships, four conference championships, one league championship and have appeared in the playoffs twenty-three times.

There have been 24 head coaches for the Wizards franchise. The franchise's first coach was Jim Pollard, who led the team for one season. Dick Motta is the only Wizards coach to have led the team to a championship; the team won the 1978 NBA Finals as the Washington Bullets during his tenure. Gene Shue is the only Wizards coach to have won the NBA Coach of the Year Award; he won it twice, in 1969 and 1982. No Wizards coach has been elected into the Basketball Hall of Fame as a coach, but four have been elected into the Hall of Fame as a player: Jim Pollard, Buddy Jeannette, K. C. Jones and Wes Unseld. Shue is the franchise's all-time leader in regular-season games coached (1027) and wins (522); Jones is the franchise's all-time leader in regular-season winning percentage (.630). Dick Motta is the franchise's all-time leader in playoff games coached (51) and wins (27), as well as playoff-game winning percentage (.529). Five Wizards coaches have spent their entire NBA head coaching career with the team: Mike Farmer, Bob Staak, Jim Brovelli, Leonard Hamilton and Ed Tapscott. The team's current head coach is Brian Keefe.

== Key ==
GC	Games coached
W	Wins
L	Losses
Win%	Winning percentage
#	Number of coaches^{[a]}
*	Spent entire NBA head coaching career with the Packers/Zephyrs/Bullets/Wizards

== Coaches ==
#	Name	Term^{[b]}	GC	W	L	Win%	GC	W	L	Win%	Achievements	Reference
#	Name	Term^{[b]}	Regular season				Playoffs				Achievements	Reference
1	Jim Pollard	1961–1962	80	18	62	.359	—	—	—	—		
2	Jack McMahon	1962	38	12	26	.316	—	—	—	—		
3	Bobby Leonard	1962–1964 (as player-coach)	122	44	78	.361	—	—	—	—		
4	Buddy Jeannette	1964–1965	80	37	43	.463	10	5	5	.500		
5	Paul Seymour	1965–1966	80	38	42	.475	3	0	3	.000		
6	Mike Farmer*	1966 (interim)	9	1	8	.111	—	—	—	—		
—	Buddy Jeannette	1966 (interim)	16	3	13	.188	—	—	—	—		
7	Gene Shue	1966–1973	548	291	257	.531	40	14	26	.350	1968–69 NBA Coach of the Year	
8	K. C. Jones	1973–1976	246	155	91	.630	31	14	17	.452		
9	Dick Motta	1976–1980	328	185	143	.564	51	27	24	.529	NBA Championship (1978)	
—	Gene Shue	1980–1986	479	231	248	.482	15	5	10	.333	1981–82 NBA Coach of the Year	
10	Kevin Loughery	1986–1988	122	57	65	.467	8	2	6	.250		
11	Wes Unseld	1988–1994	547	202	345	.369	5	2	3	.400		
12	Jim Lynam	1994–1997	210	82	128	.390	—	—	—	—		
13	Bob Staak*	1997 (interim)	1	0	1	.000	—	—	—	—		
14	Bernie Bickerstaff	1997–1999	149	77	72	.517	3	0	3	.000		
15	Jim Brovelli*	1999 (interim)	18	5	13	.278	—	—	—	—		
16	Gar Heard	1999–2000	44	14	30	.318	—	—	—	—		
17	Darrell Walker	2000 (interim)	38	15	23	.395	—	—	—	—		
18	Leonard Hamilton*	2000–2001	82	19	63	.232	—	—	—	—		
19	Doug Collins	2001–2003	164	74	90	.451	—	—	—	—		
20	Eddie Jordan	2003–2008	421	197	224	.468	26	8	18	.308		
21	Ed Tapscott*	2008–2009 (interim)	71	18	53	.254	—	—	—	—		
22	Flip Saunders	2009–2012	181	51	130	.282	—	—	—	—		
23	Randy Wittman	2012–2016	377	178	199	.472	21	12	9	.571		
24	Scott Brooks	2016–2021	390	183	207	.469	24	10	14	.417		
25	Wes Unseld Jr.*	2021–2024	207	77	130	.372	—	—	—	—		
26	Brian Keefe	2024–present	203	43	160	.212	—	—	—	—		

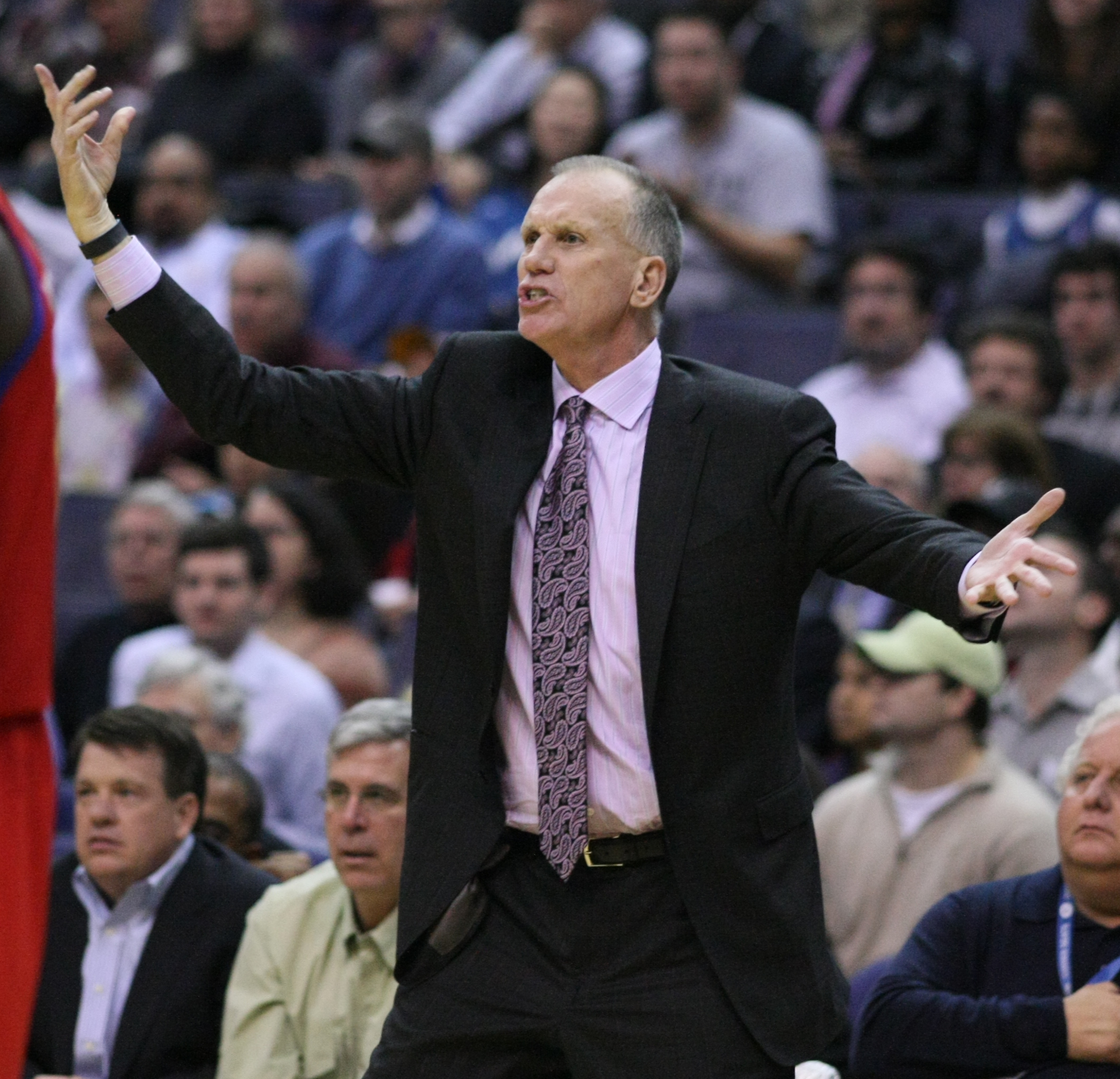
Doug Collins coached the Wizards for two seasons from 2001 to 2003.

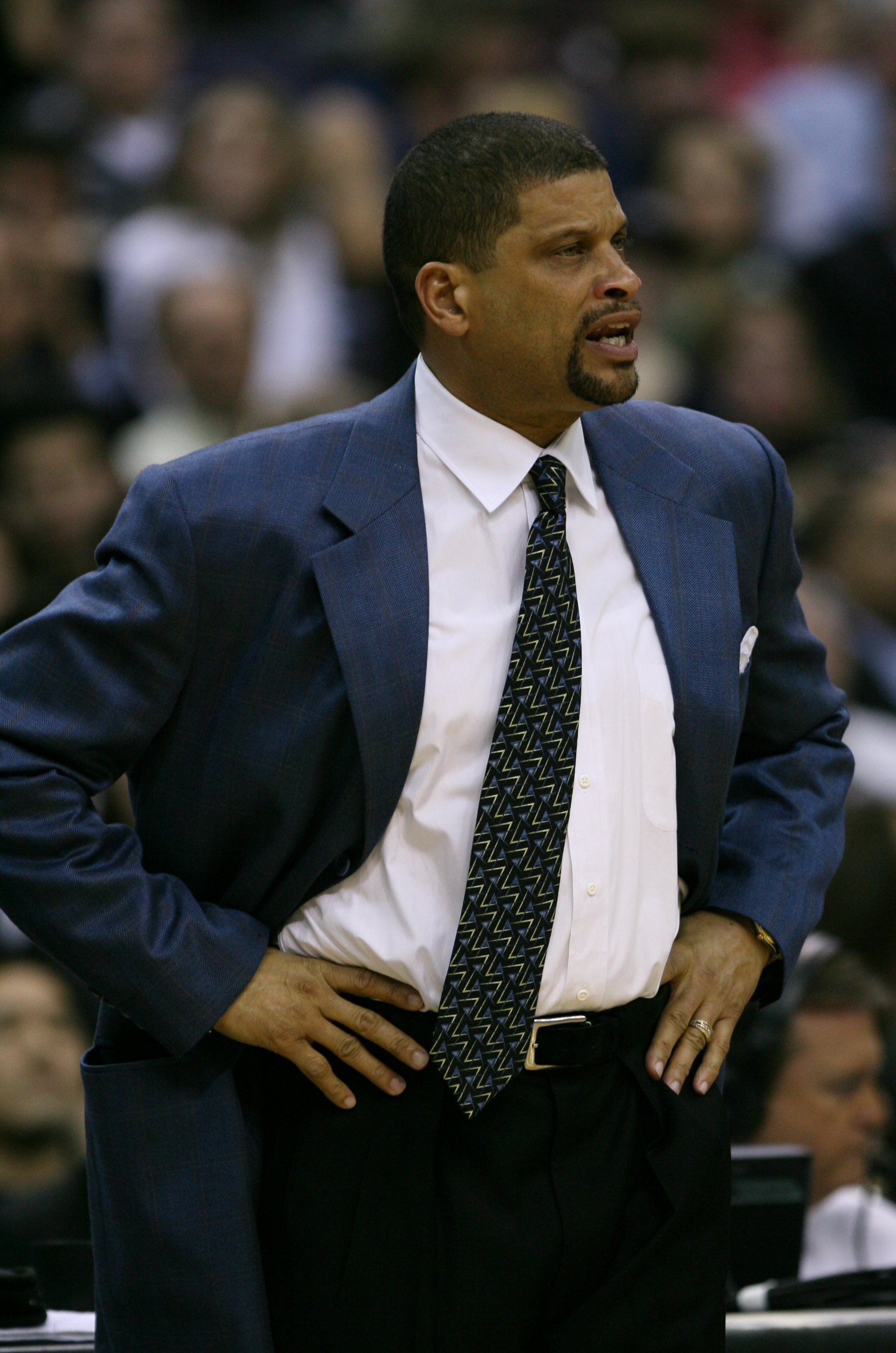
Eddie Jordan was the head coach for the Wizards from 2003 to 2008.

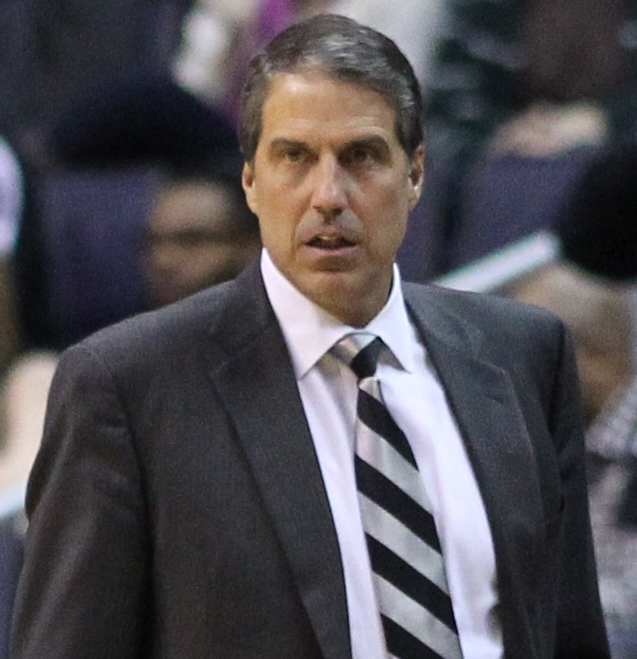
Randy Wittman was the head coach for the Wizards from 2012 to 2016.

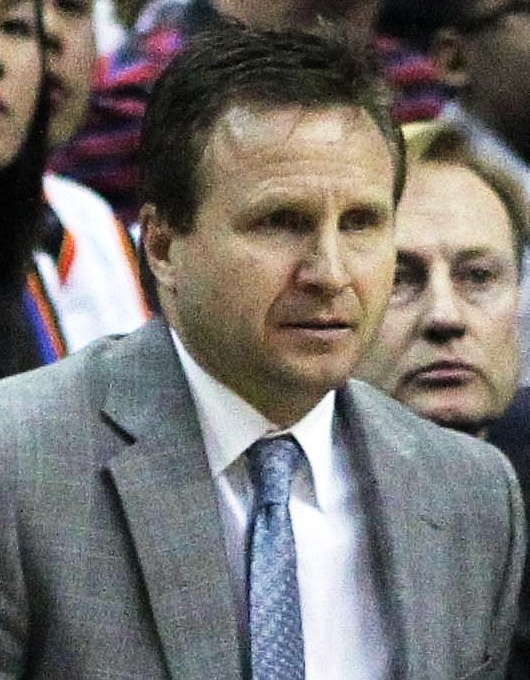
Scott Brooks was the head coach for the Wizards from 2016 to 2021.

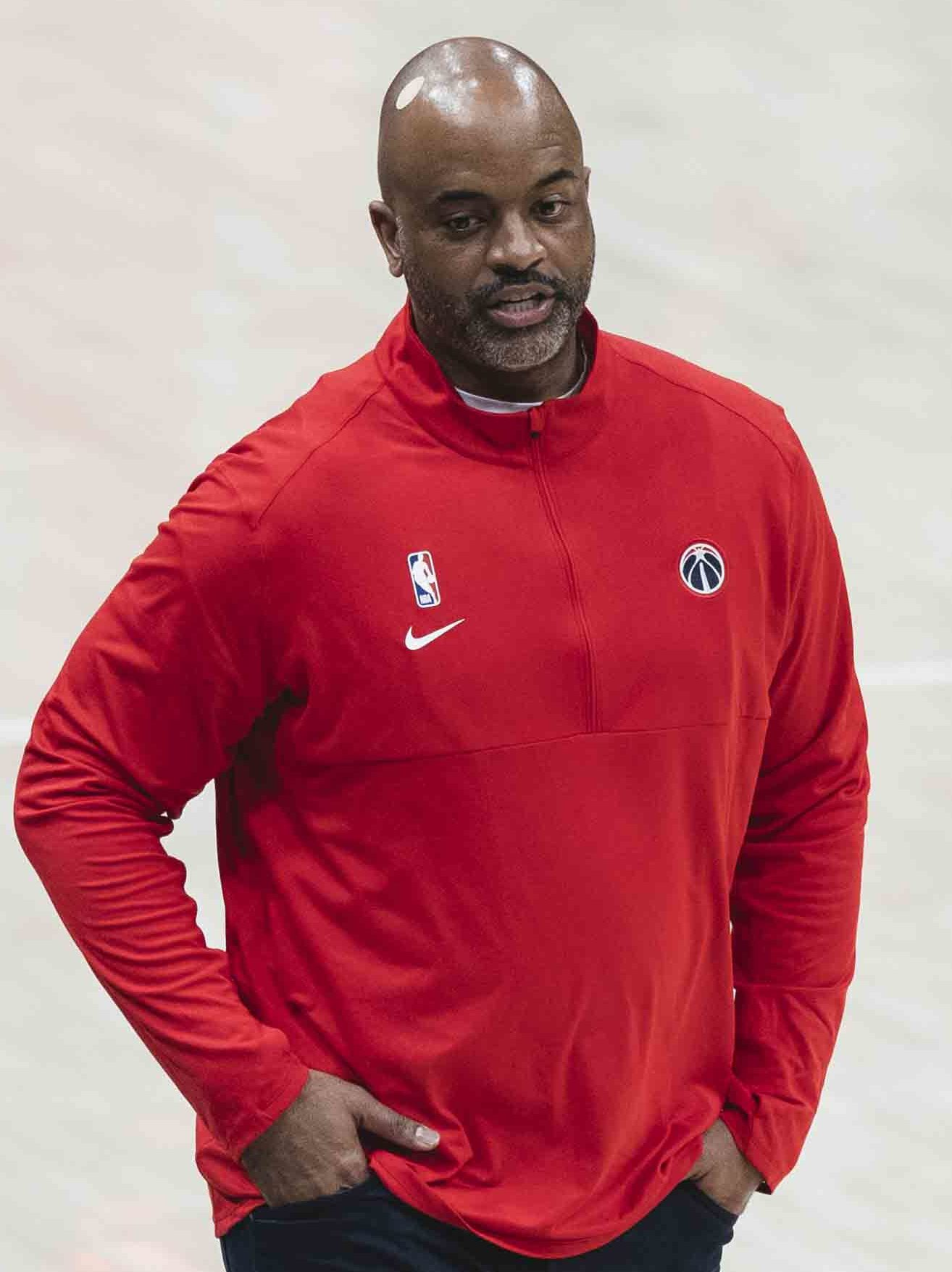
Wes Unseld Jr. was the head coach for the Wizards from 2021 to 2024.

== Notes ==
- ^{a} A running total of the number of coaches of the franchise. Thus, any coach who has two or more separate terms as head coach is only counted once.
- ^{b} Each year is linked to an article about that particular NBA season.
