= List of Portland Trail Blazers head coaches =

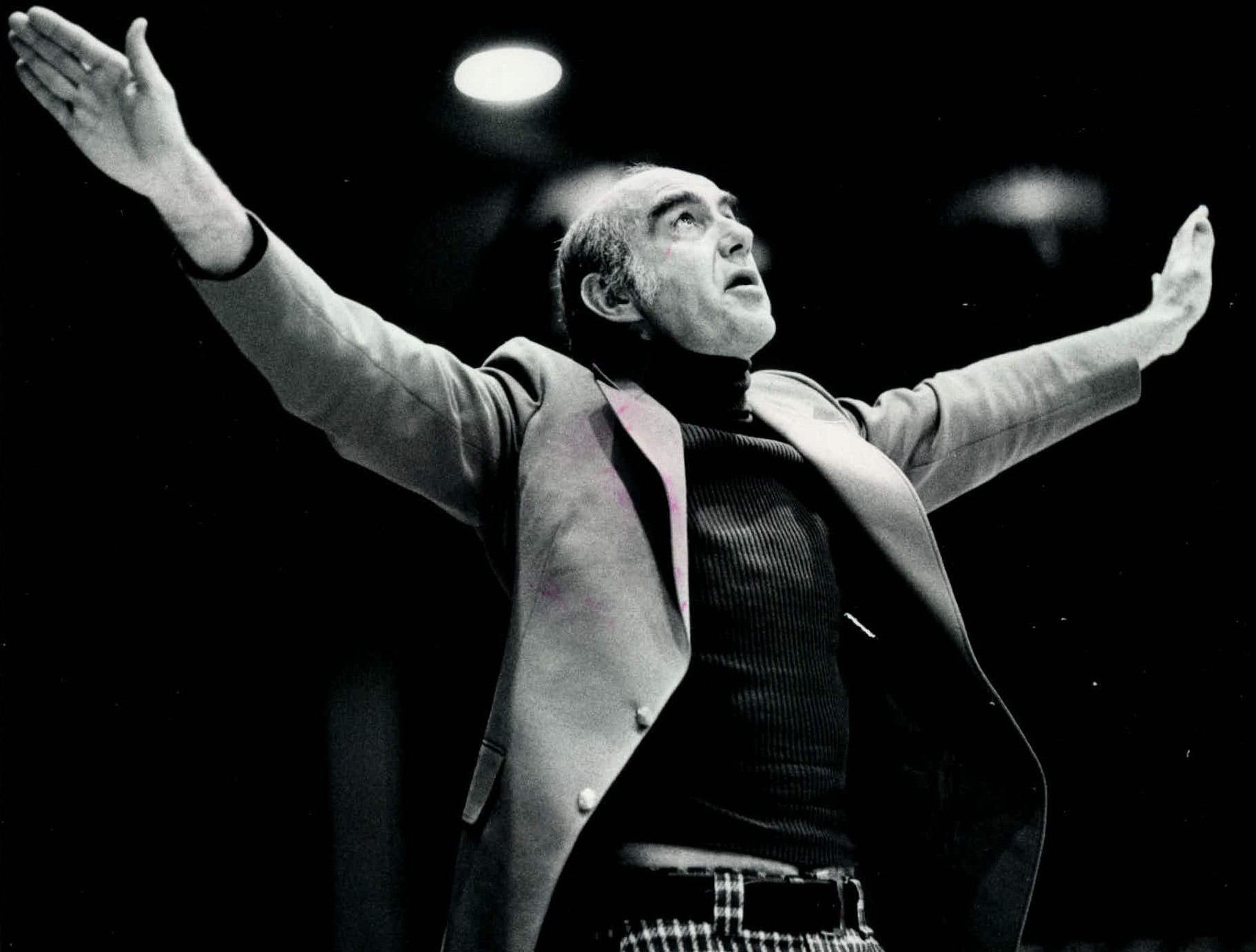
Jack Ramsay coached the Blazers to their only NBA Championship in 1977.

The Portland Trail Blazers are an American professional basketball team based in Portland, Oregon. The Trail Blazers play in the Northwest Division of the Western Conference in the National Basketball Association (NBA). The franchise entered the NBA in 1970. The Trail Blazers sold out 814 consecutive home games from 1977 through 1995, the longest such streak in American professional sports. The team has played their home games at the Moda Center (formerly the Rose Garden) since the 1995–96 NBA season. The Trail Blazers are owned by Thomas Dundon, and Joe Cronin is their general manager.

There have been 16 head coaches for the Trail Blazers franchise. The franchise's first head coach was Rolland Todd, who coached for two seasons. Jack Ramsay is the franchise's all-time leader for the most regular season games coached (820), and the most regular season game wins (453). Rick Adelman is the franchise's all-time leader for the highest winning percentage in the regular season (.654), playoff games coached (69), and most playoff game wins (36). Ramsay is the only coach to win an NBA championship with the Trail Blazers, in the 1977 NBA Finals. Ramsay and Lenny Wilkens are the only Trail Blazers coaches to be elected into the Basketball Hall of Fame, and were both named one of the top 10 coaches in NBA history. Mike Schuler and Mike Dunleavy have won the NBA Coach of the Year Award, in 1986–87 and 1998–99 respectively, with the Trail Blazers. Todd, Stu Inman, Jack McCloskey, Kevin Pritchard, and Kaleb Canales have spent their entire NBA coaching careers with the Trail Blazers. Canales was named interim coach of the Trail Blazers toward the end of the 2011–12 season. Terry Stotts was named as head coach on August 7, 2012. The announcement was made by General Manager Neil Olshey. At this time, his NBA coaching record was 115–168.

== Key ==
GC	Games coached
W	Wins
L	Losses
Win%	Winning percentage
#	Number of coaches^{[a]}
*	Spent entire NBA head coaching career with the Trail Blazers
†	Elected into the Basketball Hall of Fame as a coach

== Coaches ==
Note: Statistics are correct through the end of 2025–26 regular season.

#	Name	Term^{[b]}	GC	W	L	Win%	GC	W	L	Win%	Achievements	Reference
#	Name	Term^{[b]}	Regular season				Playoffs				Achievements	Reference
1	Rolland Todd*	1970–1972	138	41	97	.297	—	—	—	—		
2	Stu Inman*	1972	26	6	20	.231	—	—	—	—		
3	Jack McCloskey*	1972–1974	164	48	116	.293	—	—	—	—		
4	Lenny Wilkens†	1974–1975 (as player-coach); 1975–1976	164	75	89	.457	—	—	—	—	One of the top 10 coaches in NBA history	
5	Jack Ramsay†	1976–1986	820	453	367	.552	59	29	30	.492	1 NBA championship (1977); One of the top 10 coaches in NBA history	
6	Mike Schuler	1986–1988	211	127	84	.602	8	2	6	.250	1986–87 NBA Coach of the Year	
7	Rick Adelman†	1988–1994	445	291	154	.654	69	36	33	.522	2 NBA Finals (1990, 1992)	
8	P. J. Carlesimo	1994–1997	246	137	109	.557	12	3	9	.250		
9	Mike Dunleavy	1997–2001	296	190	106	.642	36	18	18	.500	1998–99 NBA Coach of the Year	
10	Maurice Cheeks	2001–2005	301	162	139	.538	10	3	7	.300		
11	Kevin Pritchard*	2005	27	5	22	.185	—	—	—	—		
12	Nate McMillan	2005–2012	535	266	269	.497	18	6	12	.333		
13	Kaleb Canales*	2012	23	8	15	.348	—	—	—	—		
14	Terry Stotts	2012–2021	720	402	318	.558	62	22	40	.355		
15	Chauncey Billups*	2021–2025	328	117	211	.357	—	—	—	–		
16	Tiago Splitter	2025–2026	81	42	39	.519	5	1	4	.200		
17	Micah Nori	2026–present										

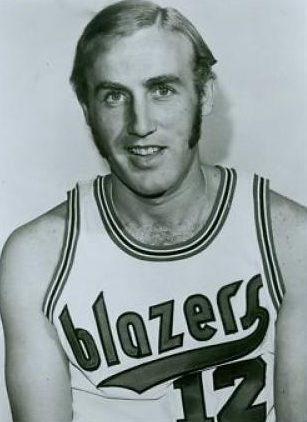
Rick Adelman was the head coach of the Portland Trail Blazers from 1988 to 1994, and led them to their Second NBA Finals in 1990 and 1992

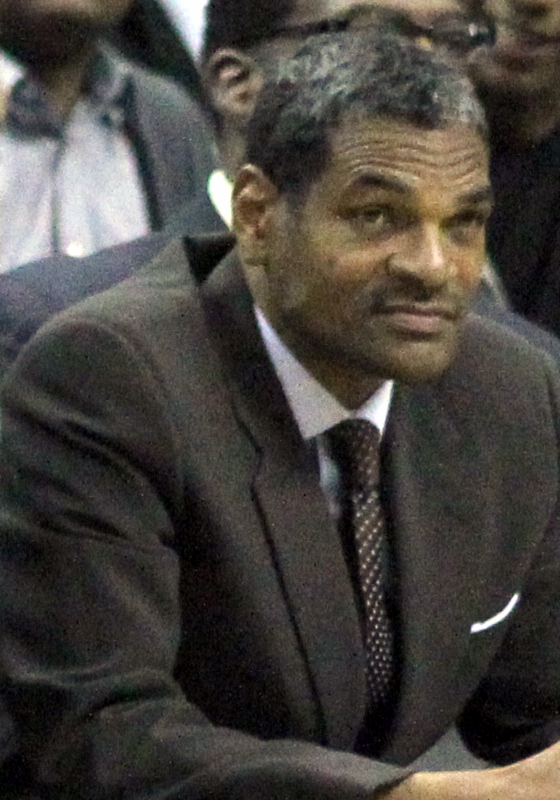
Maurice Cheeks was the head coach of the Portland Trail Blazers from 2001 to 2005

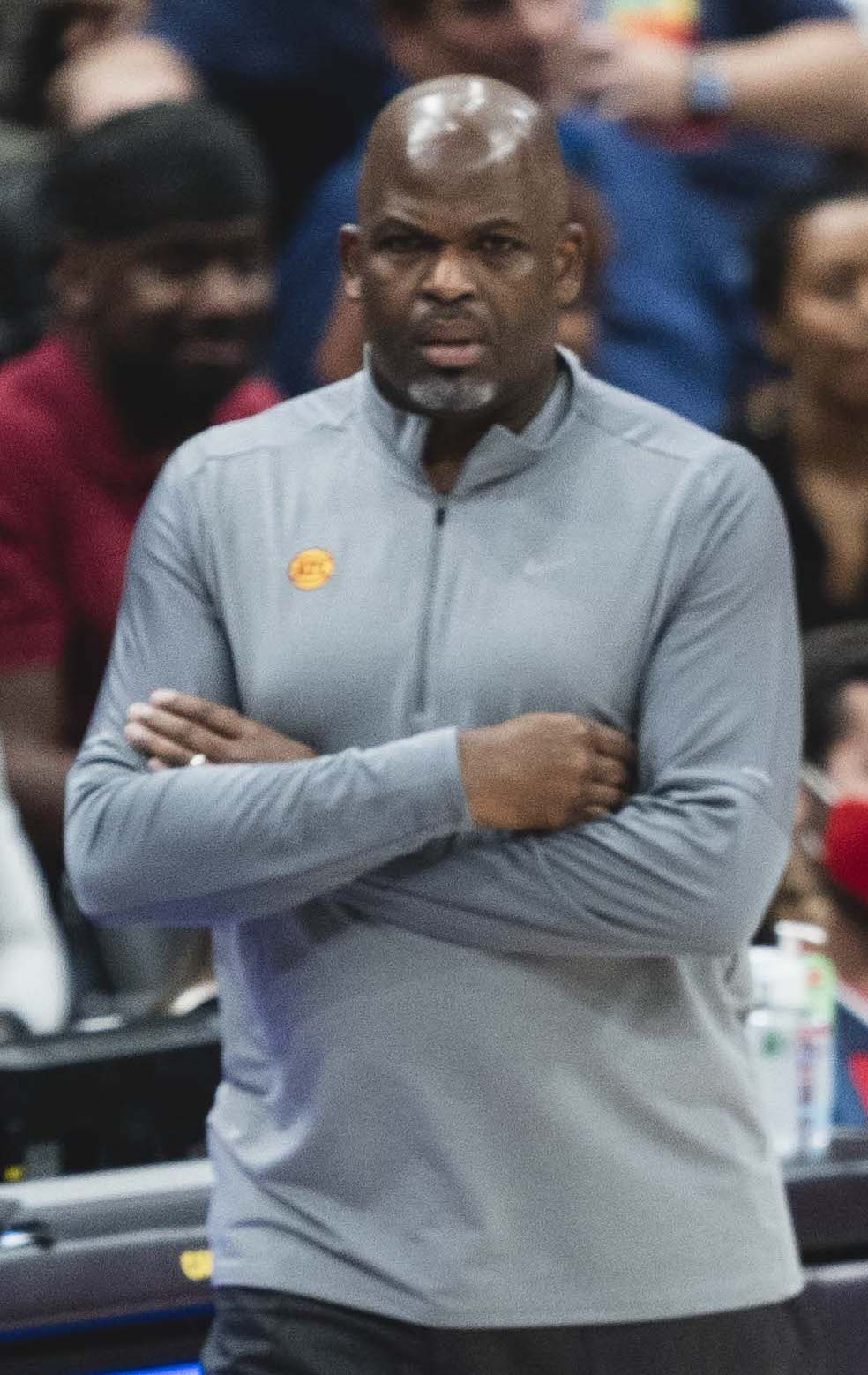
Nate McMillan was the head coach of the Portland Trail Blazers from 2005 to 2012

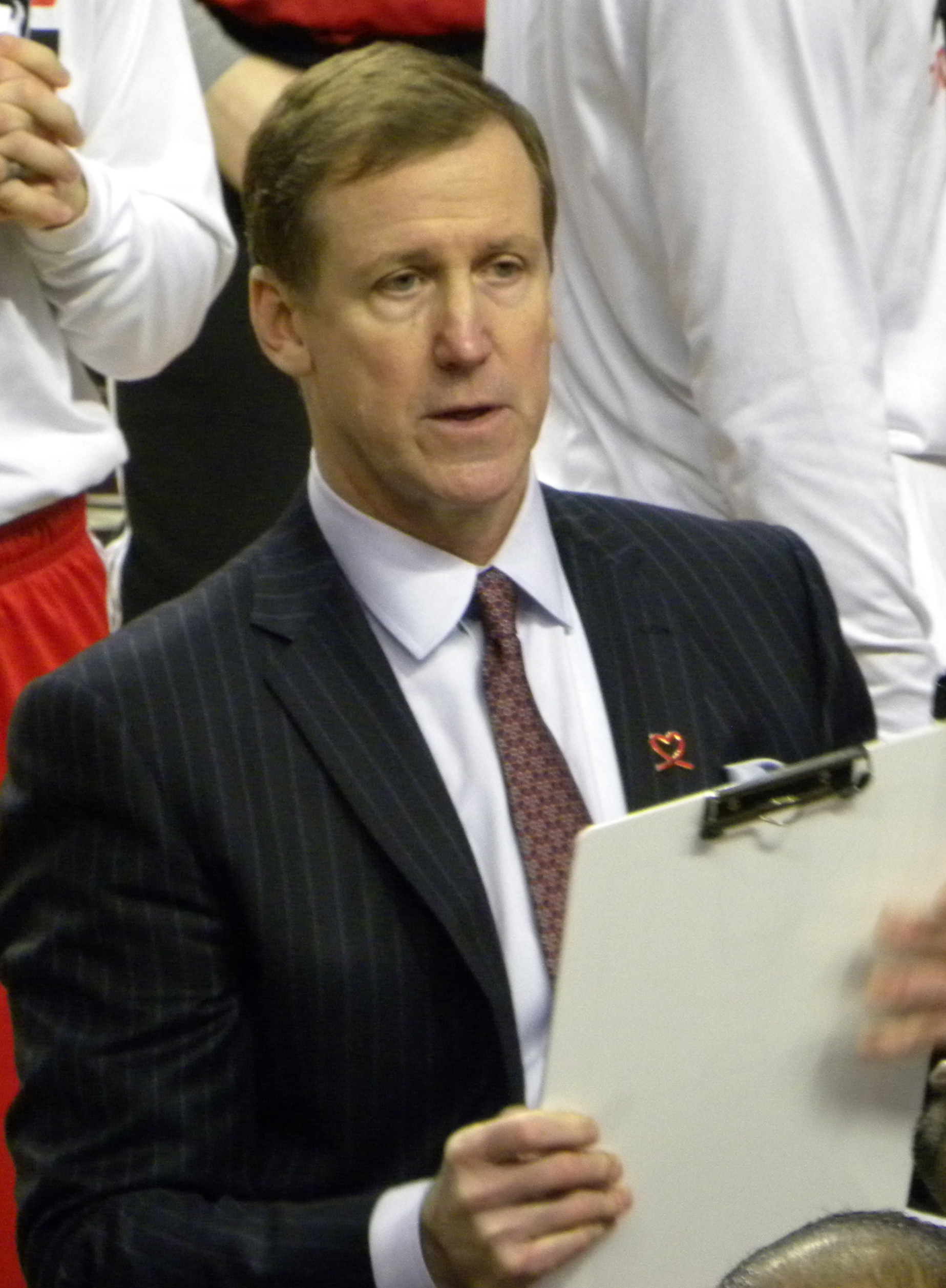
Terry Stotts was the head coach of the Portland Trail Blazers from 2012 to 2021

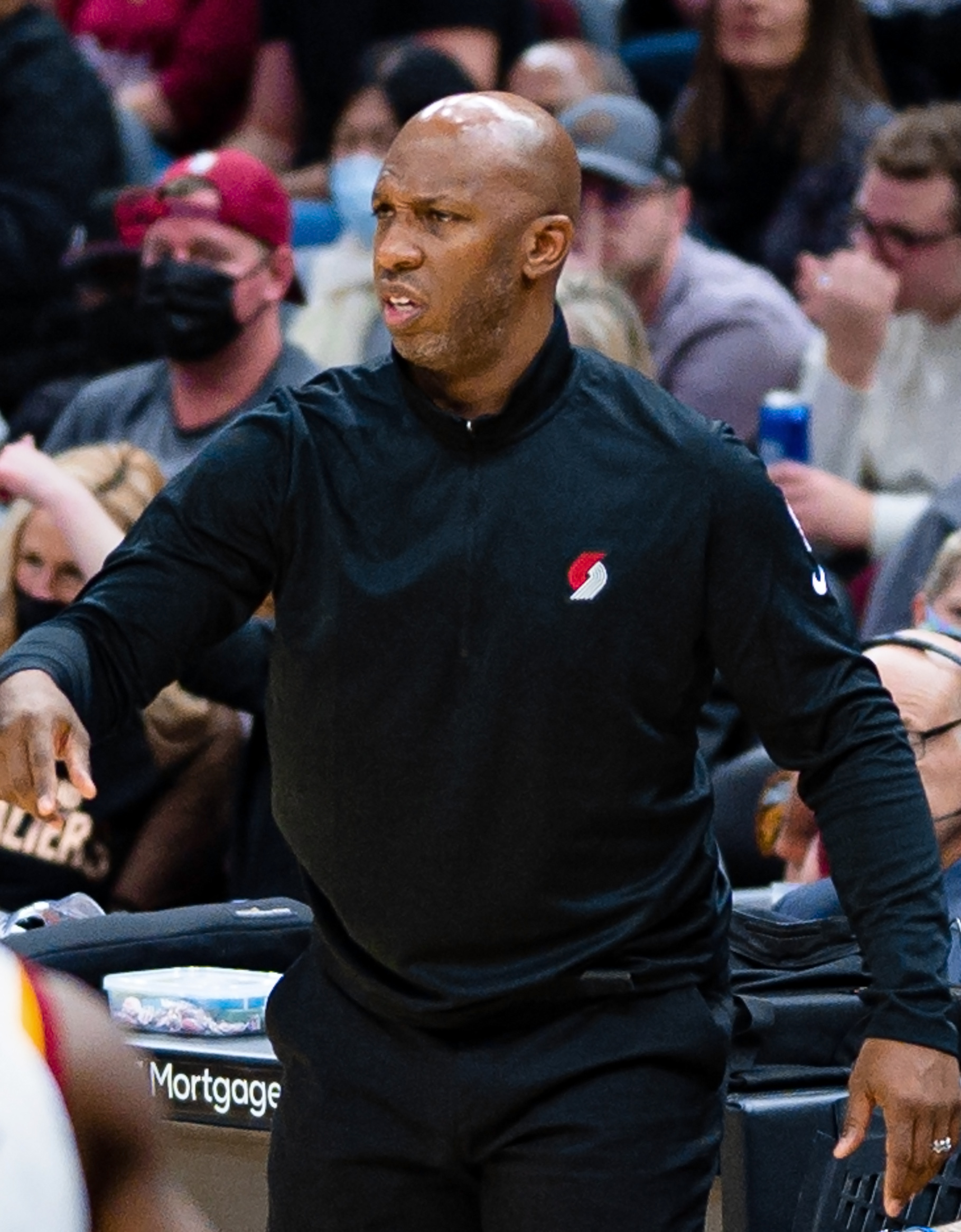
Chauncey Billups was the head coach of the Portland Trail Blazers from 2021 to 2025

== Notes ==
- ^{a} A running total of the number of coaches of the Trail Blazers. Thus, any coach who has two or more separate terms as head coach is only counted once.
- ^{b} Each year is linked to an article about that particular NBA season.
