= List of Cleveland Cavaliers head coaches =

The Cleveland Cavaliers are an American professional basketball team based in Cleveland, Ohio. The Cavaliers play in the Central Division of the Eastern Conference in the National Basketball Association (NBA). The team joined the NBA in 1970 as an expansion team and won their first Eastern Conference championship in 2007. The Cavaliers have played their home games at Rocket Arena, formerly known as Rocket Mortgage FieldHouse, Quicken Loans Arena, and Gund Arena, since 1994. The Cavaliers are owned by Dan Gilbert, with Koby Altman as their general manager. American R&B-pop singer Usher Raymond is a minority owner.

There have been 24 head coaches for the Cavaliers franchise. The current head coach is Kenny Atkinson. The franchise's first head coach was Bill Fitch, who coached for nine seasons. Fitch is the franchise's all-time leader for the most regular-season games coached (738); Lenny Wilkens is the franchise's all-time leader for the most regular-season game wins (316); Mike Brown is the franchise's all-time leader for the most playoff games coached (71) and the most playoff game wins (42). Atkinson has the highest regular-season winning percentage (.707) and David Blatt has the highest playoff winning percentage (.700). Tyronn Lue is the only coach to lead the Cavaliers to an NBA championship, in 2016. Chuck Daly, Wilkens and Fitch have been elected into the Basketball Hall of Fame as head coaches, partly due to their work with the Cavaliers. Fitch, Daly and Wilkens were also named as 3 of the top 10 coaches in NBA history. Fitch, Brown, and Atkinson are the only Cavaliers coaches to have won the NBA Coach of the Year Award.

== Key ==
GC	Games coached
W	Wins
L	Losses
Win%	Winning percentage
#	Number of coaches^{[a]}
*	Spent entire NBA head coaching career with the Cavaliers
†	Elected into the Basketball Hall of Fame as a coach

== Coaches ==
Note: Statistics are correct through the end of the 2025–26 season.

#	Name	Term^{[b]}	GC	W	L	Win%	GC	W	L	Win%	Achievements	Reference
#	Name	Term^{[b]}	Regular season				Playoffs				Achievements	Reference
1	Bill Fitch†	1970–1979	738	304	434	.412	18	7	11	.389	1975–76 NBA Coach of the Year; One of the top 10 coaches in NBA history	
2	Stan Albeck	1979–1980	82	37	45	.451	—	—	—	—		
3	Bill Musselman	1980–1981	71	25	46	.352	—	—	—	—		
4	Don Delaney*	1981	26	7	19	.269	—	—	—	—		
5	Bob Kloppenburg	1981	3	0	3	.000	—	—	—	—		
6	Chuck Daly†	1981–1982	41	9	32	.220	—	—	—	—	One of the top 10 coaches in NBA history	
—	Bill Musselman	1982	23	2	21	.087	—	—	—	—		
7	Tom Nissalke	1982–1984	164	51	113	.311	—	—	—	—		
8	George Karl†	1984–1986	149	61	88	.409	4	1	3	.250		
9	Gene Littles	1986	15	4	11	.267	—	—	—	—		
10	Lenny Wilkens†	1986–1993	574	316	258	.551	41	18	23	.439	One of the top 10 coaches in NBA history	
11	Mike Fratello	1993–1999	460	248	212	.539	14	2	12	.143		
12	Randy Wittman	1999–2001	164	62	102	.378	—	—	—	—		
13	John Lucas II	2001–2003	124	37	87	.298	—	—	—	—		
14	Keith Smart	2003	40	9	31	.225	—	—	—	—		
15	Paul Silas	2003–2005	146	69	77	.473	—	—	—	—		
16	Brendan Malone	2005	18	8	10	.444	—	—	—	—		
17	Mike Brown	2005–2010	410	272	138	.663	71	42	29	.592	Eastern Conference championship (2007); 2008–09 NBA Coach of the Year	
18	Byron Scott	2010–2013	230	64	166	.278	—	—	—	—		
—	Mike Brown	2013–2014	82	33	49	.402	—	—	—	—		
19	David Blatt*	2014–2016	113	83	40	.675	20	14	6	.700	Eastern Conference championship (2015)	
20	Tyronn Lue	2016–2018	211	128	83	.607	61	41	20	.672	NBA championship (2016); Three Eastern Conference championships (2016–2018); 2016 ESPY Award for Best Coach/Manager	
21	Larry Drew	2018–2019	76	19	57	.250	—	—	—	—		
22	John Beilein*	2019–2020	54	14	40	.259	—	—	—	—		
23	J. B. Bickerstaff	2020–2024	329	170	159	.517	17	6	11	.353		
24	Kenny Atkinson	2024–present	164	116	48	.707	50	22	28	.440	2024–25 NBA Coach of the Year	

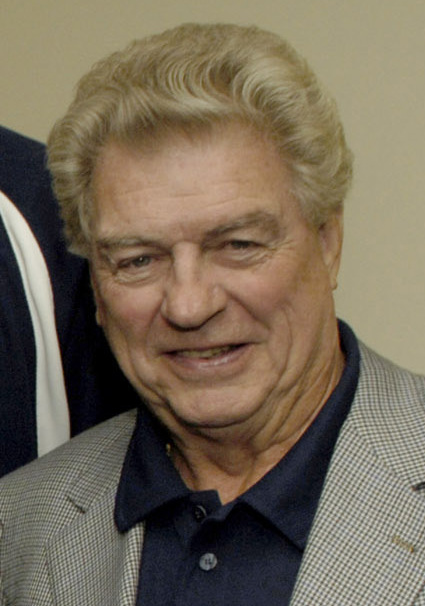
After coaching the Cavaliers for 41 games (with a 9–32 record), Chuck Daly was dismissed during the 1981–82 season.

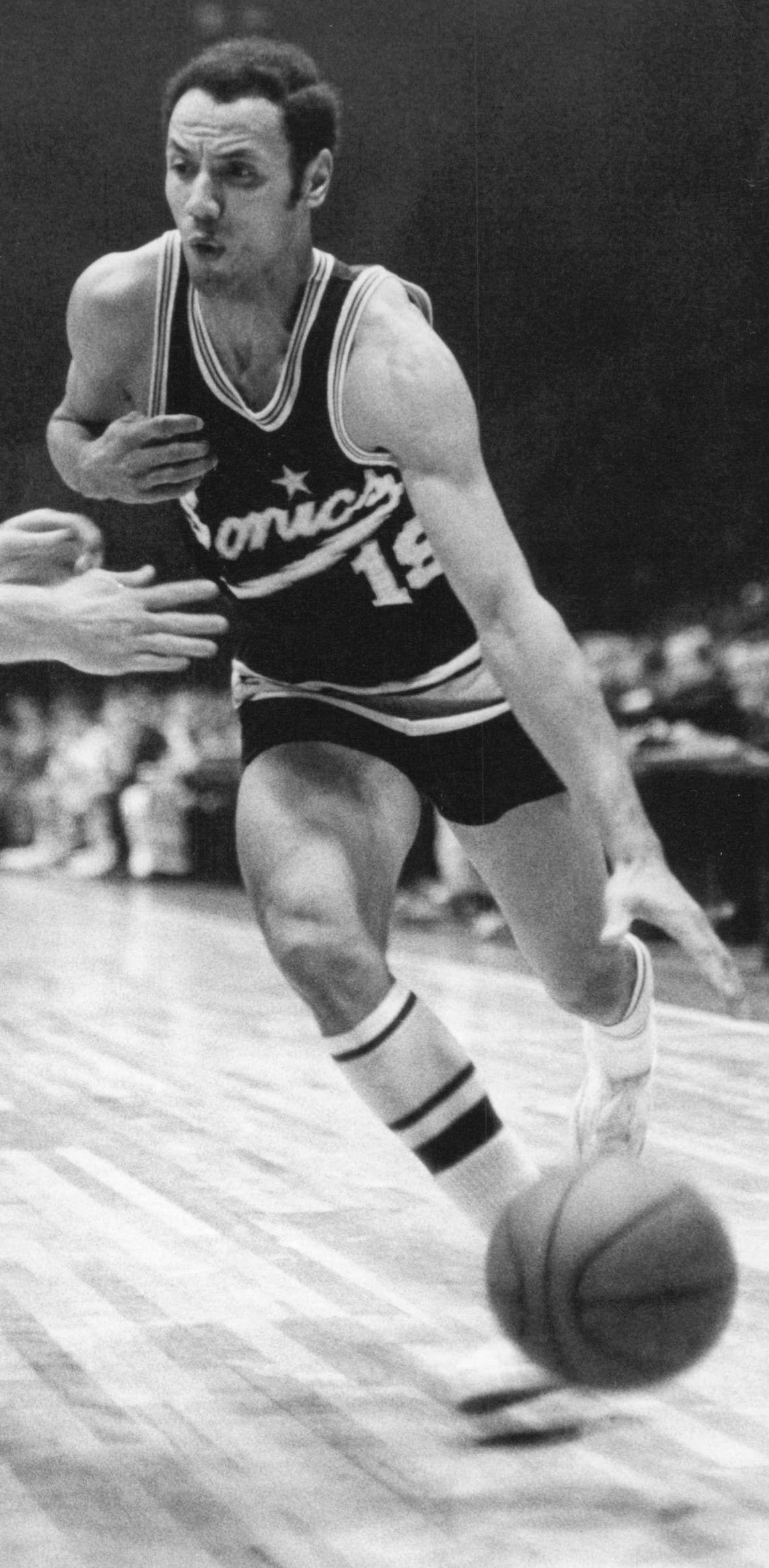
Lenny Wilkens was the head coach of the Cleveland Cavaliers from 1986 to 1993.

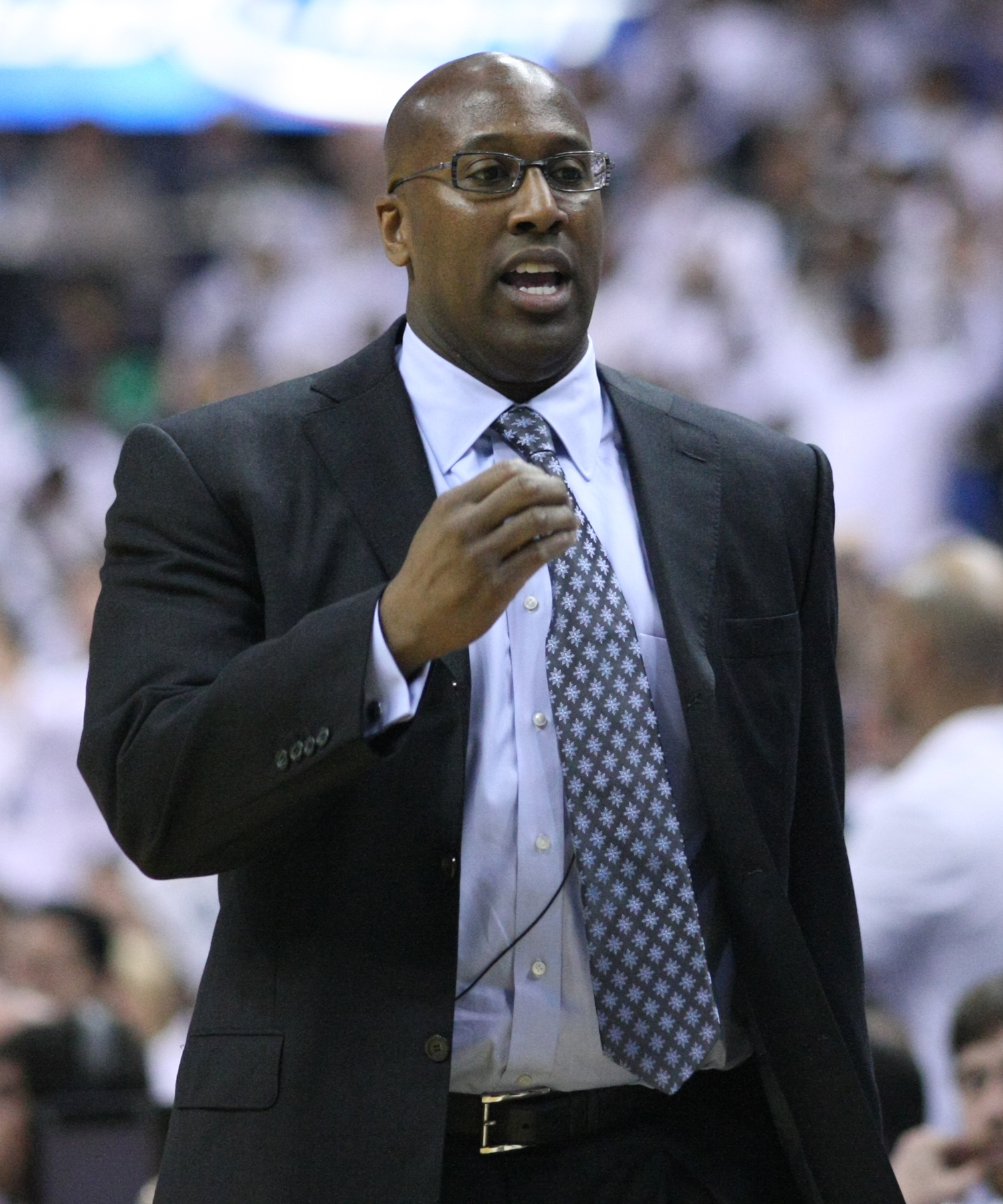
Two-time head coach Mike Brown coached the Cavaliers from 2005 to 2010, and again during the 2013–14 season. During his first stint, he led the Cavs to their first NBA Finals appearance in 2007.

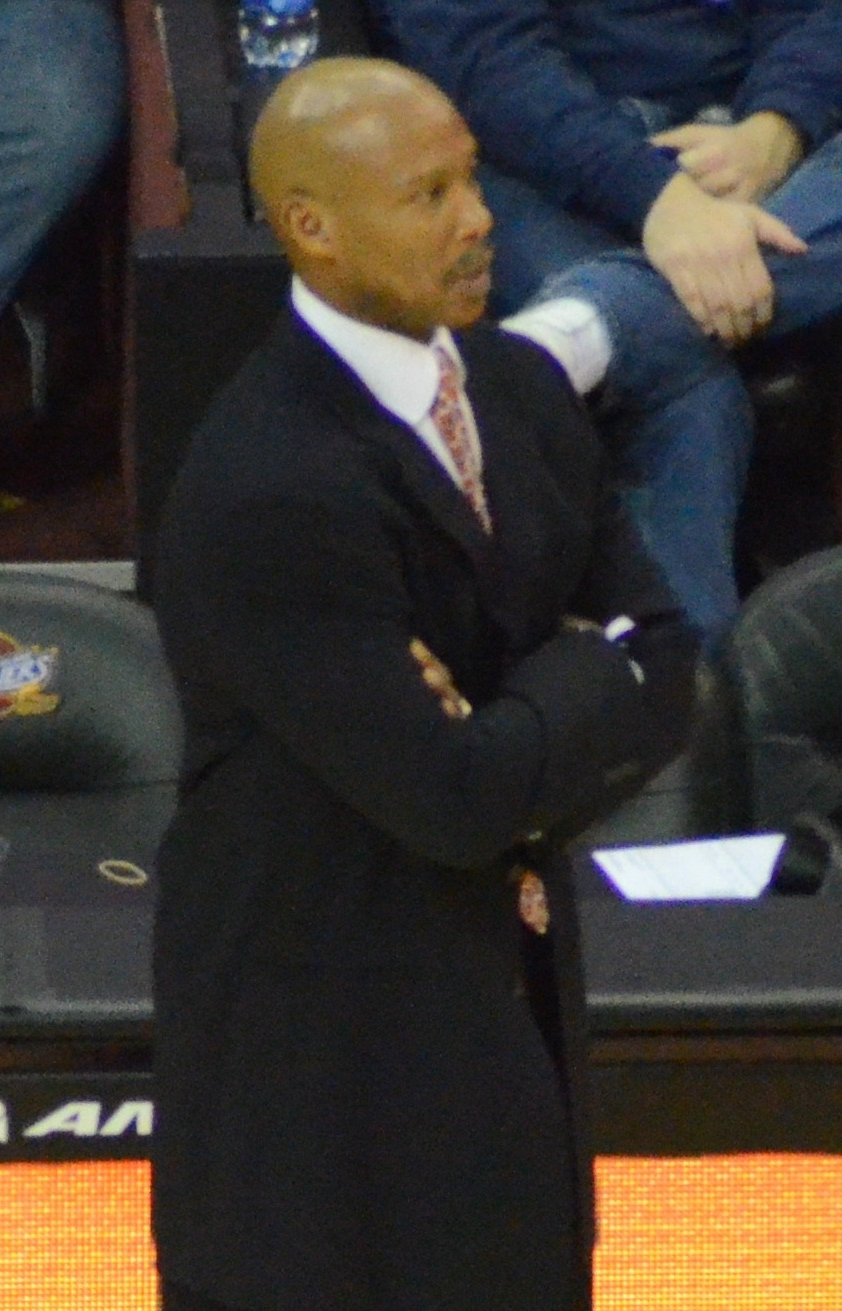
Byron Scott was the head coach of the Cavaliers from 2010 to 2013. During the 2010–2011 season, the Cavs lost 26 games in a row - tied for the longest losing streak in the four major professional sports.
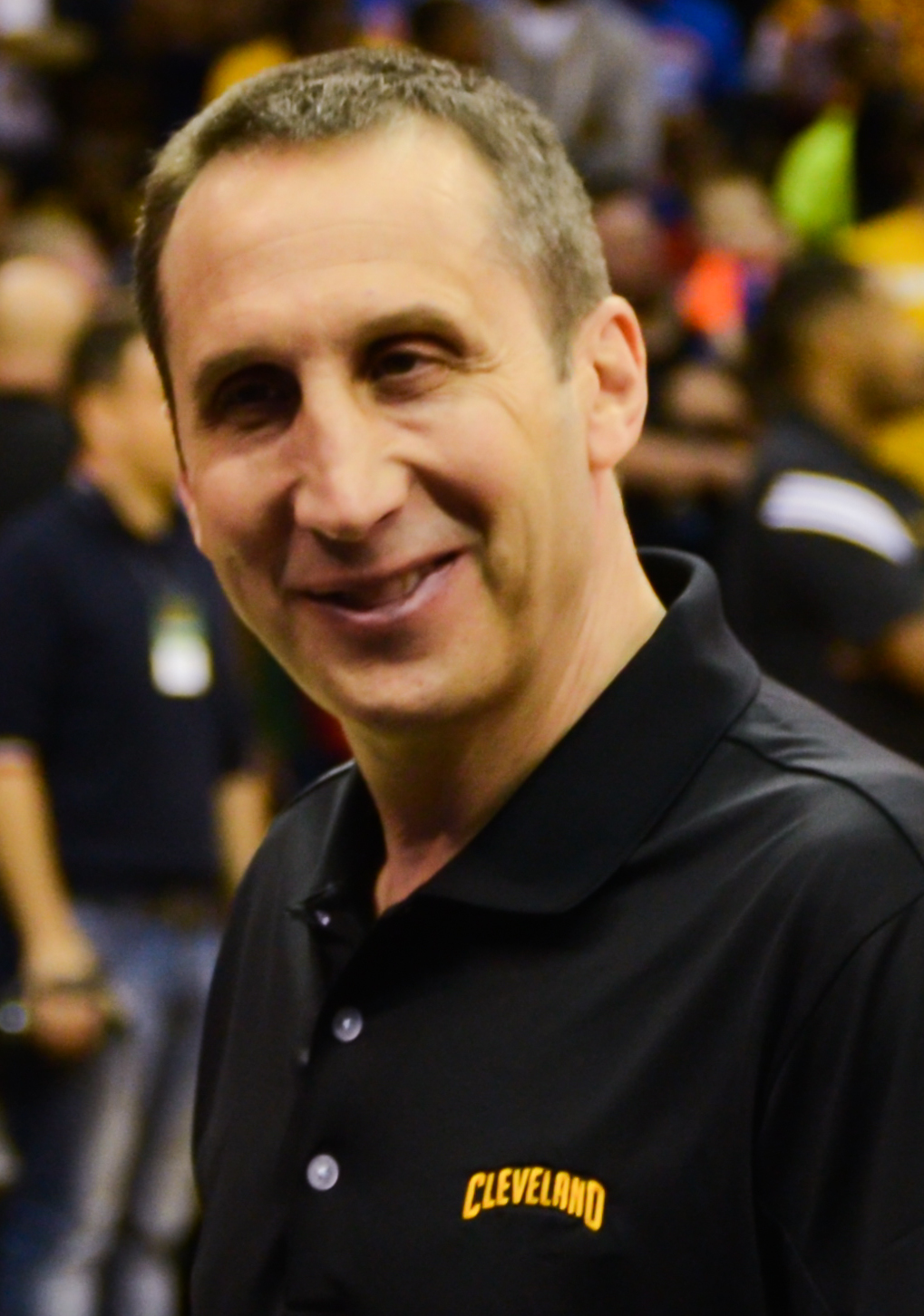
David Blatt was the Cavaliers head coach from 2014–2016.

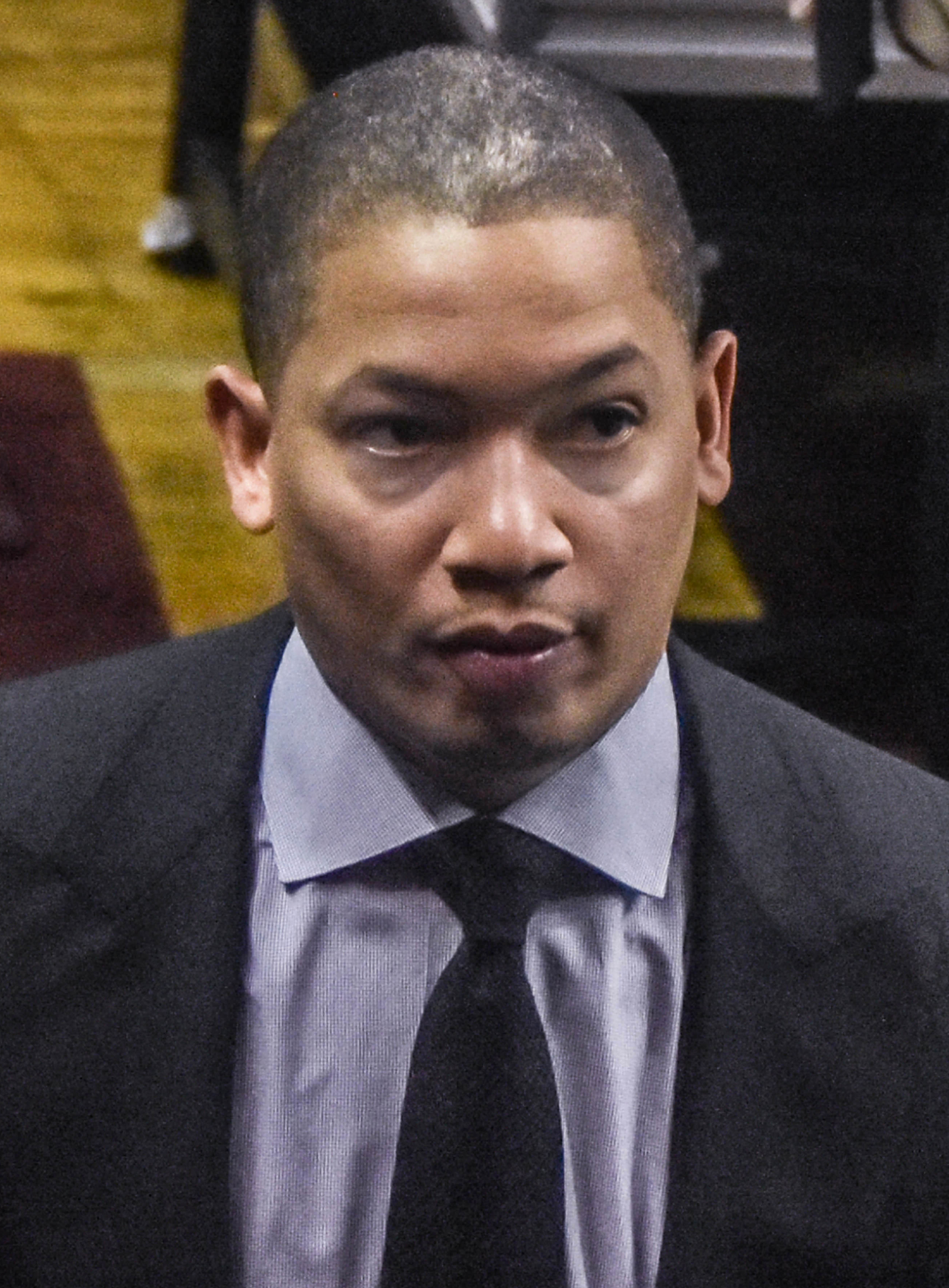
Tyronn Lue was the Cavaliers head coach from 2016–2018, leading the team to the 2016 NBA Championship

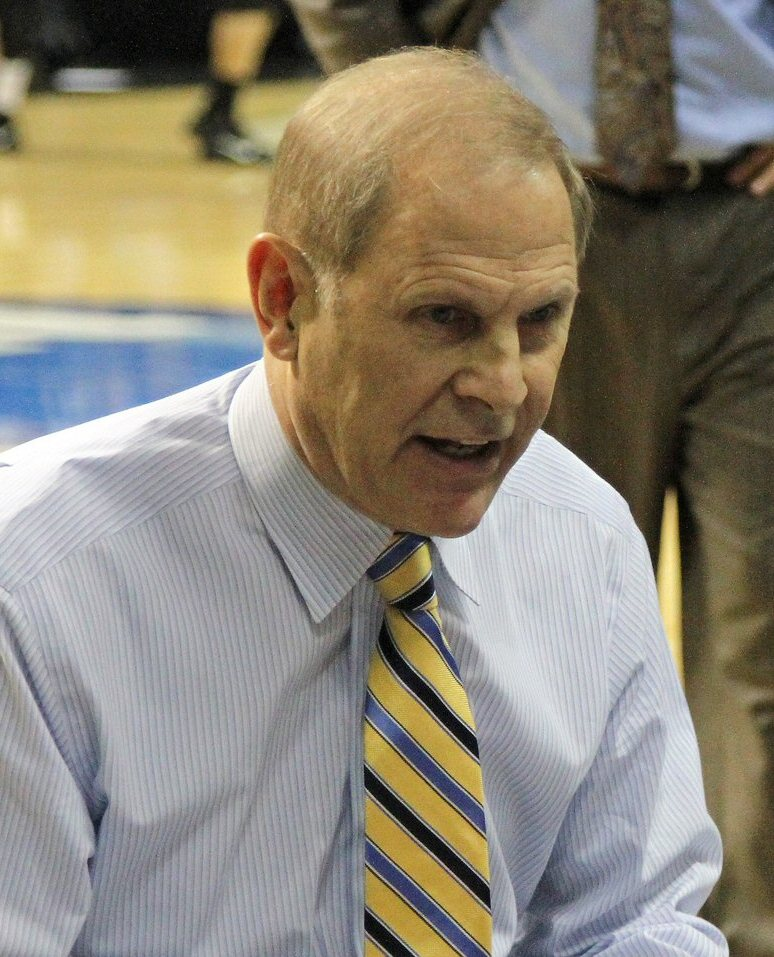
John Beilein was the Cavaliers head coach for part of the 2019–20 season.

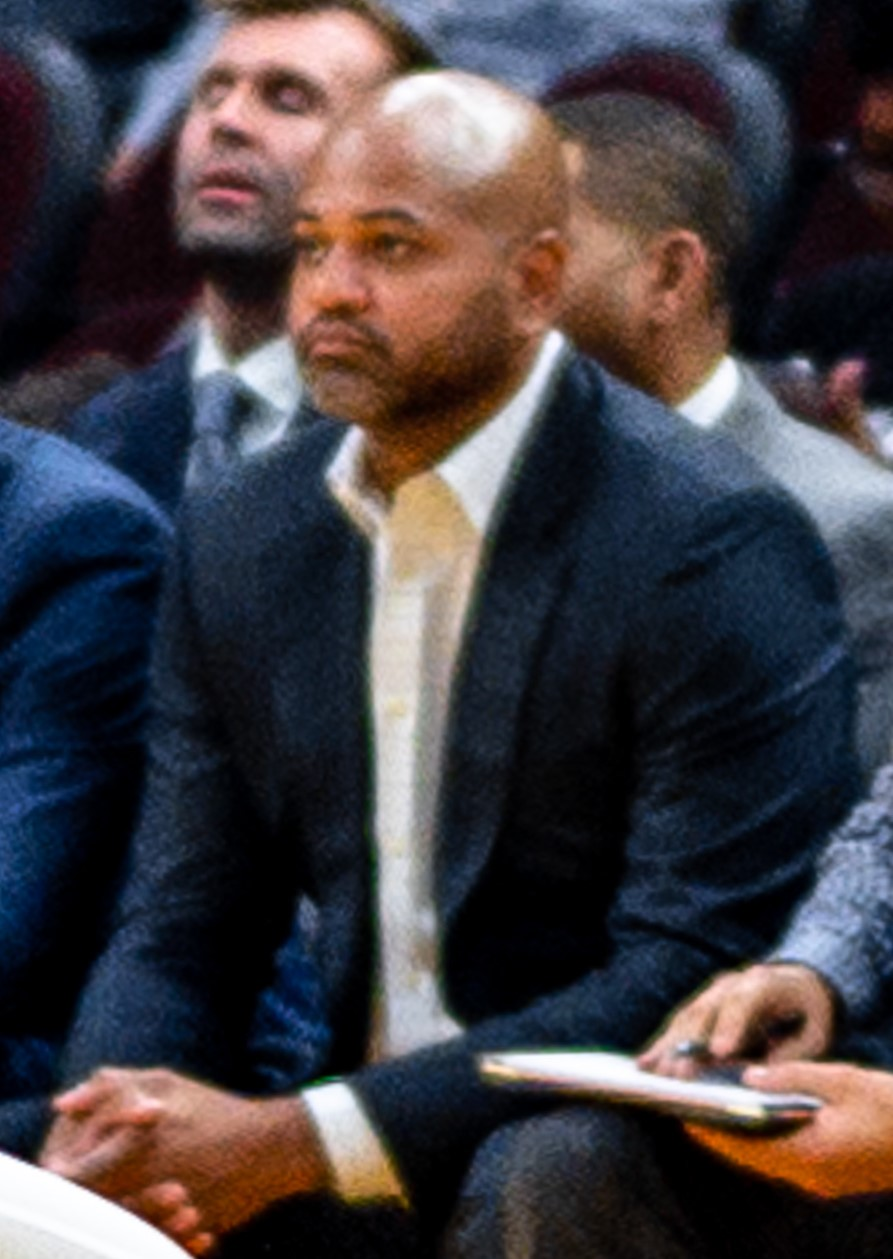
J. B. Bickerstaff was the Cavaliers head coach from 2020–2024

== Notes ==
- ^{a} A running total of the number of coaches of the Cavaliers. Thus, any coach who has two or more separate terms as head coach is only counted once.
- ^{b} Each year is linked to an article about that particular NBA season.
