= List of Los Angeles Clippers head coaches =

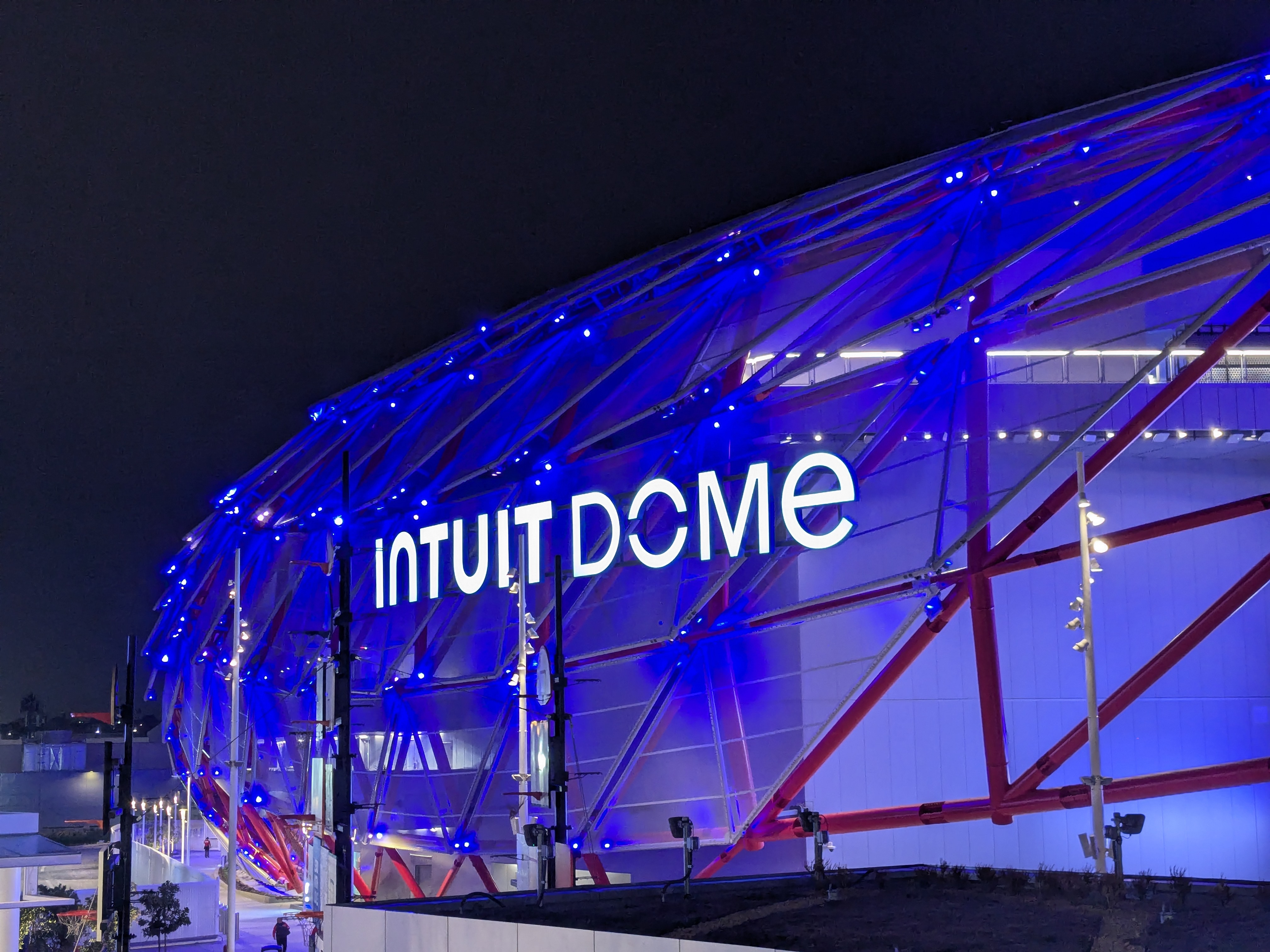
The Clippers have played their home games at Intuit Dome since 2024.

The Los Angeles Clippers are an American professional basketball team based in Los Angeles, California. They play in the Pacific Division of the Western Conference in the National Basketball Association (NBA). The Clippers joined the NBA in 1970 as an expansion team. The team has had three names since its inception: the Buffalo Braves (1970–1978), the San Diego Clippers (1978–1984), and the Los Angeles Clippers (1984–present). The Clippers are the oldest franchise in the NBA to have never reached the league finals. The Clippers play at Intuit Dome in Inglewood, California, as of the 2024–25 NBA season. Previously, the team played its home games at the Crypto.com Arena (formerly Staples Center) from 1999 to 2024. The Clippers are owned by Steve Ballmer, and Trent Redden is their general manager.

There have been 25 head coaches for the Clippers. The franchise's first head coach was Dolph Schayes, who coached for 83 games in two seasons. Mike Dunleavy is the franchise's all-time leader in regular-season games coached (541). Doc Rivers is the franchise's all-time leader in regular-season games won (307), playoff games coached (46), and playoff games won (22). Jack Ramsay, Larry Brown, Bill Fitch, Mike Dunleavy, Vinny Del Negro, Doc Rivers, and Tyronn Lue, are the only coaches to have reached the playoffs with the Clippers. Ramsay and Fitch were also named as two of the Top 10 Coaches in NBA History in 1996. Ramsay, Brown and Fitch are the only Clippers coaches to have been elected into the Basketball Hall of Fame as a coach. The current head coach of the Clippers is Tyronn Lue.

== Key ==
| GC | Games coached |
| W | Wins |
| L | Losses |
| Win% | Winning percentage |
| # | Number of coaches |
| * | Spent entire NBA head coaching career with the Braves/Clippers |
| † | Elected into the Basketball Hall of Fame as a coach |

== Coaches ==
Note: Statistics are correct through the end of the 2024–25 season.

| # | Name | Term | GC | W | L | Win% | GC | W | L | Win% | Achievements | Reference |
| # | Name | Term | Regular season | | | | Playoffs | | | | Achievements | Reference |
|---|---|---|---|---|---|---|---|---|---|---|---|---|
Buffalo Braves
| 1 | Dolph Schayes | 1970–1971 | 83 | 22 | 61 | .265 | — | — | — | — | | |
| 2 | Johnny McCarthy* | 1971–1972 | 81 | 22 | 59 | .272 | — | — | — | — | | |
| 3 | Jack Ramsay† | 1972–1976 | 328 | 158 | 170 | .482 | 22 | 9 | 13 | .409 | One of the top 10 coaches in NBA history (1996) | |
| 4 | Tates Locke* | 1976–1977 | 46 | 16 | 30 | .348 | — | — | — | — | | |
| 5 | Bob MacKinnon | 1977 | 7 | 3 | 4 | .429 | — | — | — | — | | |
| 6 | Joe Mullaney | 1977 | 29 | 11 | 18 | .379 | — | — | — | — | | |
| 7 | Cotton Fitzsimmons | 1977–1978 | 82 | 27 | 55 | .329 | — | — | — | — | | |
San Diego Clippers
| 8 | Gene Shue | 1978–1980 | 164 | 78 | 86 | .476 | — | — | — | — | | |
| 9 | Paul Silas | 1980–1983 | 246 | 78 | 168 | .317 | — | — | — | — | | |
| 10 | Jim Lynam | 1983–1984 | 82 | 30 | 52 | .366 | — | — | — | — | | |
Los Angeles Clippers
| — | Jim Lynam | 1984–1985 | 61 | 22 | 39 | .361 | — | — | — | — | | |
| 11 | Don Chaney | 1985–1987 | 185 | 53 | 132 | .286 | — | — | — | — | | |
| — | Gene Shue | 1987–1989 | 120 | 27 | 93 | .225 | — | — | — | — | | |
| 12 | Don Casey | 1989–1990 | 126 | 41 | 85 | .325 | — | — | — | — | | |
| 13 | Mike Schuler | 1990–1992 | 127 | 52 | 75 | .409 | — | — | — | — | | |
| 14 | Mack Calvin* | 1992 | 2 | 1 | 1 | .500 | — | — | — | — | | |
| 15 | Larry Brown† | 1992–1993 | 117 | 64 | 53 | .547 | 10 | 4 | 6 | .400 | One of the 15 Greatest Coaches in NBA History (2021) | |
| 16 | Bob Weiss | 1993–1994 | 82 | 27 | 55 | .329 | — | — | — | — | | |
| 17 | Bill Fitch† | 1994–1998 | 328 | 99 | 229 | .302 | 3 | 0 | 3 | .000 | One of the top 10 coaches in NBA history (1996) | |
| 18 | Chris Ford | 1998–2000 | 95 | 20 | 75 | .211 | — | — | — | — | | |
| 19 | Jim Todd* | 2000 | 37 | 4 | 33 | .108 | — | — | — | — | | |
| 20 | Alvin Gentry | 2000–2003 | 222 | 89 | 133 | .401 | — | — | — | — | | |
| 21 | Dennis Johnson* | 2003 | 24 | 8 | 16 | .333 | — | — | — | — | | |
| 22 | Mike Dunleavy, Sr. | 2003–2010 | 541 | 215 | 326 | .397 | 12 | 7 | 5 | .583 | | |
| 23 | Kim Hughes* | 2010 | 33 | 8 | 25 | .242 | — | — | — | — | | |
| 24 | Vinny Del Negro | 2010–2013 | 230 | 128 | 102 | .557 | 17 | 6 | 11 | .353 | | |
| 25 | Doc Rivers | 2013–2020 | 564 | 356 | 208 | .631 | 59 | 27 | 32 | .458 | One of the 15 Greatest Coaches in NBA History (2021) | |
| 26 | Tyronn Lue | 2020–present | 482 | 276 | 206 | .573 | 37 | 16 | 21 | .432 | | |

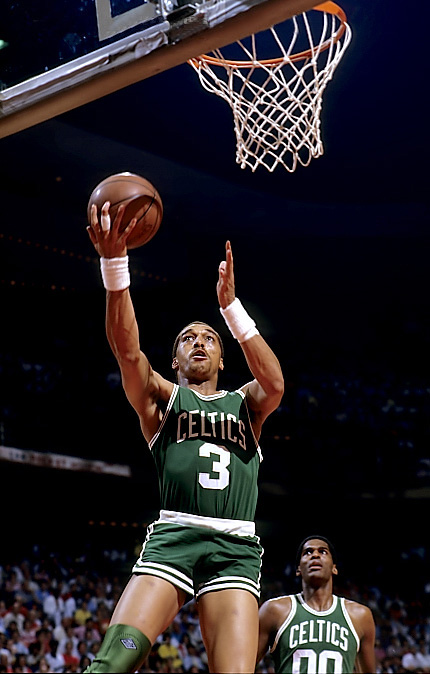
Dennis Johnson coached the Clippers for 24 games.

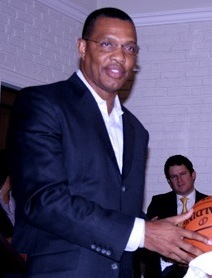
Alvin Gentry coached the Clippers from 2000 to 2003.

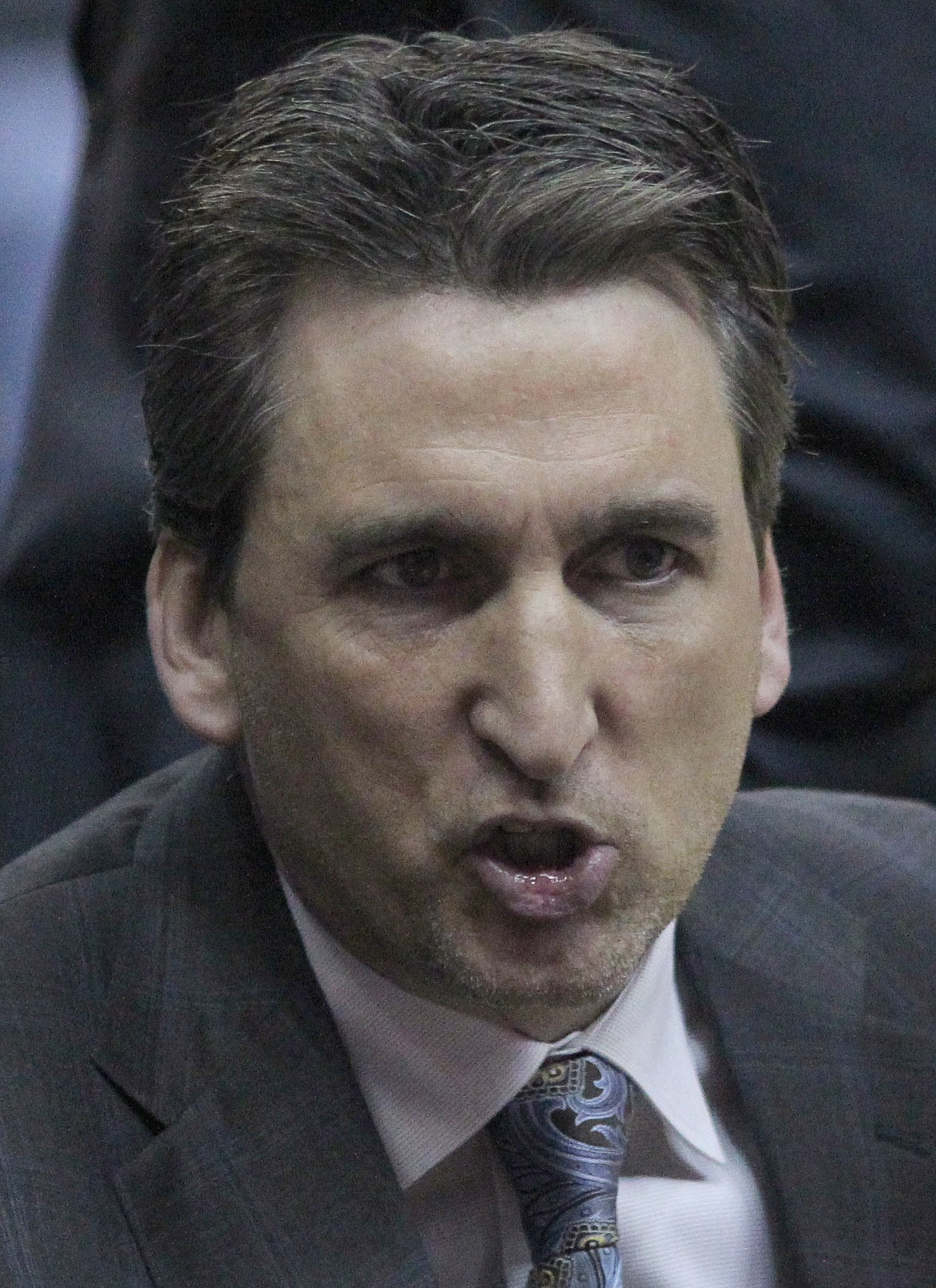
Vinny Del Negro coached the Clippers to back to back playoff appearances during his three-year tenure with the team.

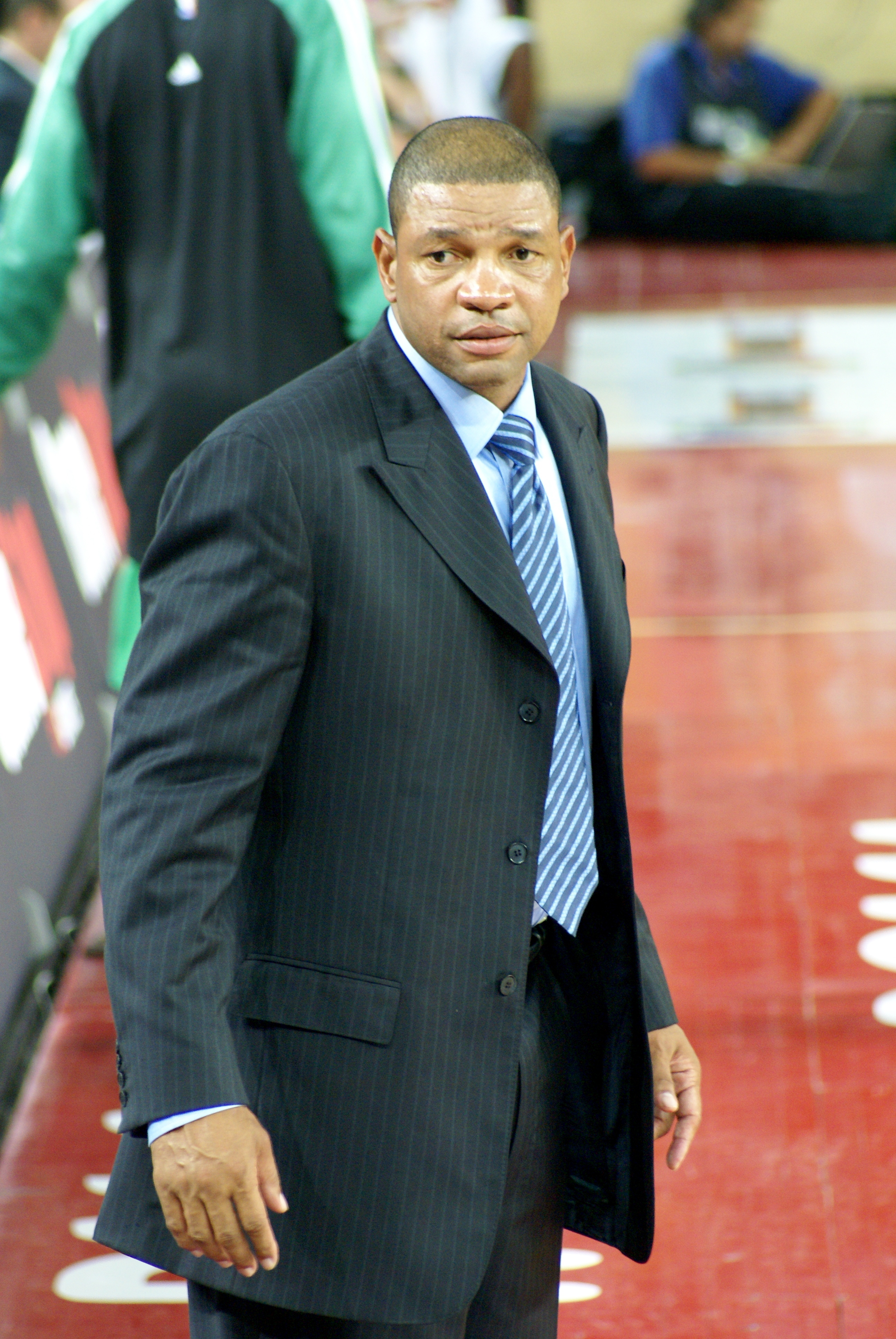
Doc Rivers was the Clippers head coach from 2013 to 2020.

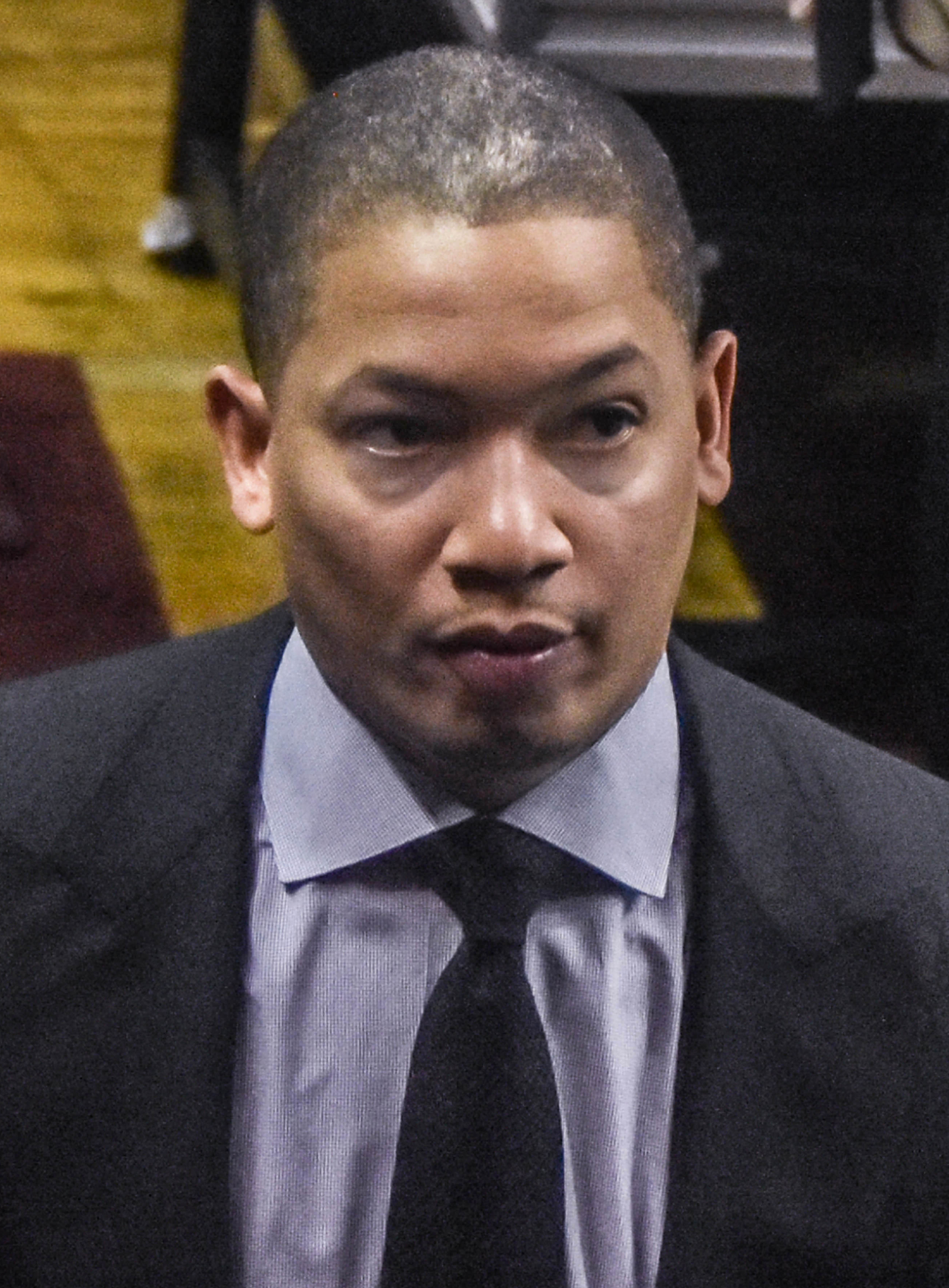
Tyronn Lue is the current head coach of the Clippers since 2020.
