= Small nucleolar RNA R24 =

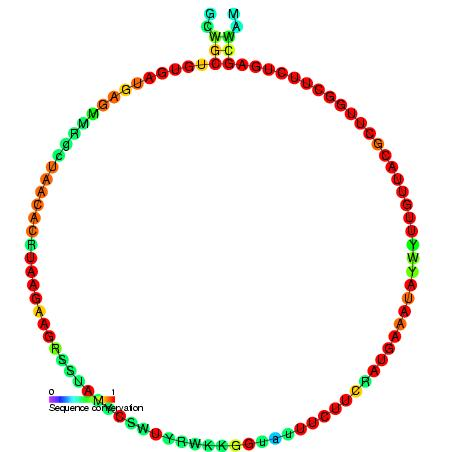
- Predicted secondary structure and sequence conservation of snoR24

Identifiers
- Symbol: snoR24
- Rfam: RF00132

Other data
- RNA type: Gene; snRNA; snoRNA; CD-box
- Domain: Eukaryota
- GO: GO:0006396 GO:0005730
- SO: SO:0000593
- PDB structures: PDBe

In molecular biology, Small nucleolar RNA R24 (also known as snoRNA R24) is a non-coding RNA (ncRNA) molecule identified in plants which functions in the modification of other small nuclear RNAs (snRNAs). This type of modifying RNA is usually located in the nucleolus of the eukaryotic cell which is a major site of snRNA biogenesis. It is known as a small nucleolar RNA (snoRNA) and also often referred to as a guide RNA.

R24 belongs to the C/D box class of snoRNAs which contain the conserved sequence motifs known as the C box (UGAUGA) and the D box (CUGA). Most of the members of the box C/D family function in directing site-specific 2'-O-methylation of substrate RNAs.

snoR24 was originally identified in Arabidopsis thaliana and is proposed to acts as a methylation guide for 18S ribosomal RNA (rRNA) in plants.
