= Leighton Barracks =

Military building in Franconia, Germany (1936–2008)

Leighton Barracks AAF Station Würzburg R-24 Fliegerhorst Würzburg
- Leighton Barracks (Germany)

Site information
- Type: Military Garrison

Location
- Coordinates: 49°47′20″N 009°58′38″E

Site history
- In use: 1936–2008
- Battles/wars: Western Front (World War II)

Leighton Barracks is a former military garrison, located on top of a hill in the Hubland area 1.8 miles (3 km) east of the City of Würzburg, in Franconia, Germany. It was active as a military base between 1936 and 2008, from 2012-onwards part of the barracks has converted to new role as additional academic buildings and student accommodation for the University of Würzburg.

== History ==
The garrison's origins begin in 1936 when Fliegerhorst Würzburg was established for the Luftwaffe as an operational base. It had an all-way grass landing/takeoff area where aircraft simply were directed into the wind for takeoffs and landings. The long-range reconnaissance group 123 (Staff and 1st - 3rd Squadron (F)/123) was set up in Würzburg on 1 Nov. 1938. It left its peacetime base in Würzburg (Galgenberg/Mönchberg) shortly before the outbreak of war at the end of August 1939 for operational bases on the border with Poland (3rd Squadron) and close to the French border. Coming from Elbing and Heiligenbeil in East Prussia, the Staff and III Group of Kampfgeschwader 3 (3rd Bomber Wing) were stationed in Würzburg (Galgenberg) with Dornier Do 17Z medium bombers from Oct. 1939 to June 1940, while the II Group/KG 3 was accommodated at Schweinfurt airfield at the same time. In June 1944 some aircraft of Transportfliegerstaffel 4 (4th Transport Aircraft Squadron) with Italian three-engine FIAT G.12 transport and liaison aircraft taken over from the Luftwaffe had been temporarily flown over to Würzburg in preparation for their stationing at Dornberg airfield (Hardheim municipality, Baden-Wuerttemberg), 44.3 km west-southwest of Würzburg (Galgenberg).

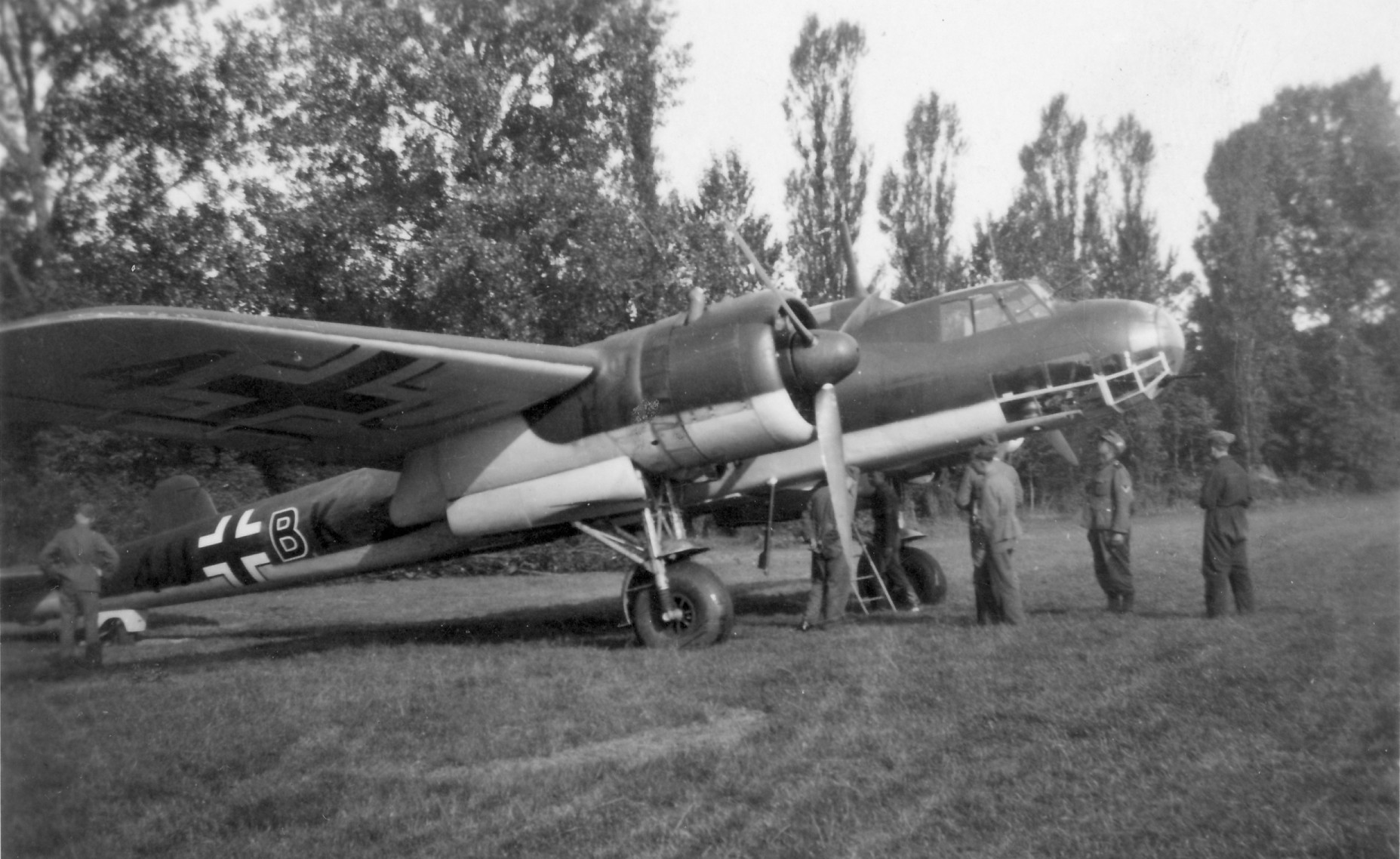
Dornier Do 17P recce aircraft of the long-range reconnaissance group (F)/123 in France, 1940

Würzburg and its airfield was captured by the United States Army in April 1945 as part of the Western Allied invasion of Germany. The airfield was repaired by IX Engineering Command, Ninth Air Force into an Army Air Forces advanced Landing Ground, designated R-24. IX Air Force Service Command units used the airfield as a casualty evacuation and combat resupply airfield. Fliegerhorst Würzburg was renamed Leighton Barracks on 17 June 1947, in honor of Captain John A. Leighton (HQ, EUCOM General Order #62, 17 June 1947). Leighton, commander of Company C, 10th Armored Infantry Battalion, 4th Armored Division, was killed in action near Raids, France, on 19 July 1944.

The former Luftwaffe/AAF airfield was reduced to a helipad, known as Leighton Army Airfield (Heliport). The garrison was closed in 2008 and returned to German control.

== See also ==
- German (Bavarian) National map M=1:25.000 (Flugplatz Würzburg-Galgenberg) Würzburg Süd 6225 (1956 and current)
- In German: "Lexikon der Wehrmacht" a) Aufklärungsgruppe 123, established on November 1, 1938 in Würzburg. b) Kampfgeschwader 3, Staff and III Gruppe in Würzburg Oct 1939 to June 1940
- In German: a) Geschichte der Savoia-Staffel / Transportfliegerstaffel 4 von Helmut Schwarz u. Karl Kössler, priv. Aufzeichnungen/private notes 1976. b) Das Flugzugemuster FIAT G.12 im Dienste der Luftwaffe von Karl Kössler, FLUGZEUG (Magazin) Nr.2 / 1987.
