= History of the Portland Trail Blazers =

Sports team history

The Portland Trail Blazers are a professional basketball team in the Western Conference of the National Basketball Association. The Trail Blazers are owned by Thomas Dundon. His predecessor, Jody Allen, assumed ownership of the team upon the death of her brother Microsoft co-founder and Vulcan Inc. chairman Paul Allen, in 2018.

The Trail Blazers' rallying cry is "Rip City", coined by play-by-play announcer Bill Schonely during their inaugural season. The team holds the NBA record for most consecutive sell-out games – set between April 9, 1977, and November 16, 1995.

The Trail Blazers have retired several players jerseys, including Naismith Memorial Basketball Hall of Fame members Clyde Drexler and Bill Walton. Jack Ramsay, who was the Trail Blazers head coach from 1976 to 1986, had the number 77 retired in honor of Portland's only NBA Finals victory in 1977. Portland has had four NBA Rookies of the Year; Geoff Petrie (1971), Sidney Wicks (1972), Brandon Roy (2007) and Damian Lillard (2013). The only NBA Most Valuable Player that earned the award as a member of the Trail Blazers was Bill Walton in 1978.

== Background and franchise opening ==
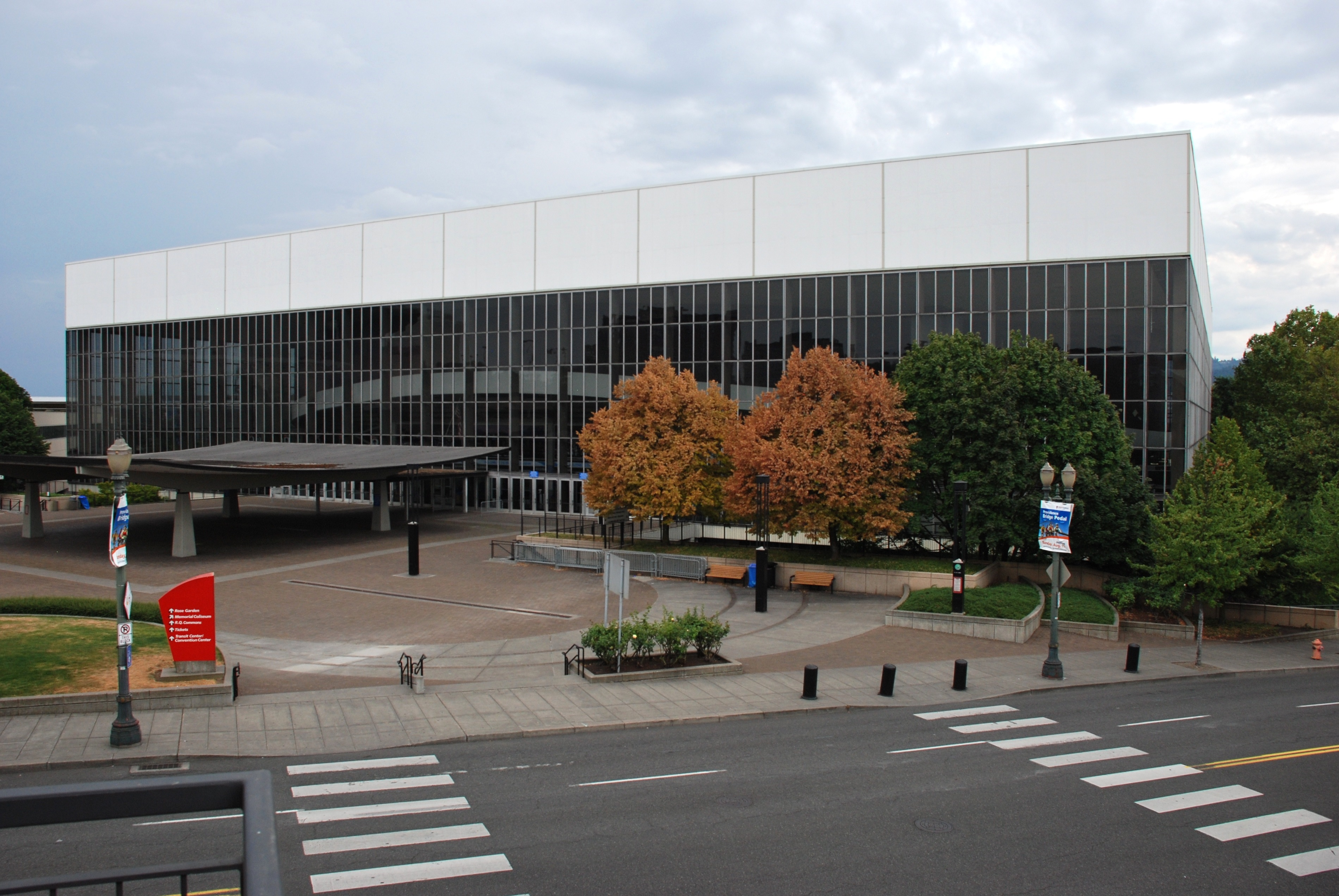
Veterans Memorial Coliseum was the Trail Blazers home court from 1970 to 1995.

Harry Glickman got interested in creating an NBA team in his hometown of Portland, Oregon as soon as the Memorial Coliseum was opened in 1960. The league commissioner at the time, Maurice Podoloff, refused on the grounds that Oregon was too far. Given that in the 1960s new commissioner J. Walter Kennedy expanded the league into the West, on February 6, 1970, the NBA board of governors granted Portland – along with Buffalo and Cleveland – the rights to a franchise in return for a $3.7 million admission. Glickman got the money from real estate magnates Robert Schmertz of New Jersey, Larry Weinberg of Los Angeles and Herman Sarkowsky of Seattle – who was recommended by Dick Vertlieb, then general manager of the Seattle SuperSonics.

== 1970–1974: Early franchise history ==
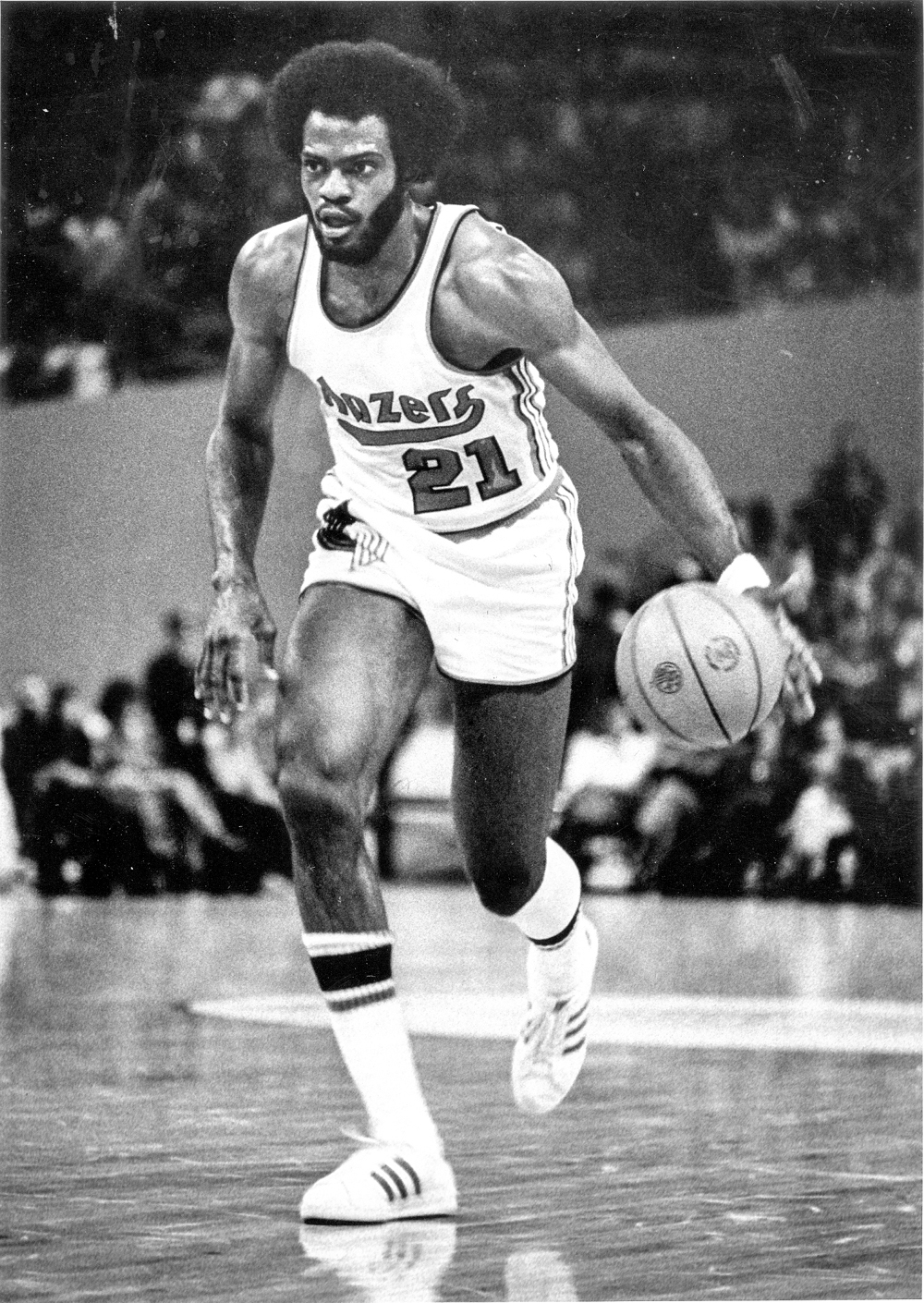
Sidney Wicks, who played in four NBA All-Star Games while with the Trail Blazers, won the NBA Rookie of the Year Award after averaging 24.5 points per game and 11.5 rebounds per game.

The Blazers started play in the 1970–71 NBA season, along with the Buffalo Braves (now the Los Angeles Clippers) and the Cleveland Cavaliers. The team was led by coach Rolland Todd, brought from the University of Nevada, and was based around Geoff Petrie, a first-round choice in the 1970 NBA draft out of Princeton University, and LeRoy Ellis, whom they acquired in the 1970 NBA expansion draft. In their first season, the Blazers finished with a 29–53 record, which was the best of the three new teams in the NBA. Petrie was named co-Rookie of the Year after averaging 24.8 points per game.

The next season, the Blazers won only 18 games, but rookie Sidney Wicks was named Rookie of the Year after averaging 24.5 points per game and 11.5 rebounds per game. The following year, the team used the first pick in the NBA draft on LaRue Martin and the Trail Blazers finished at 21–61.

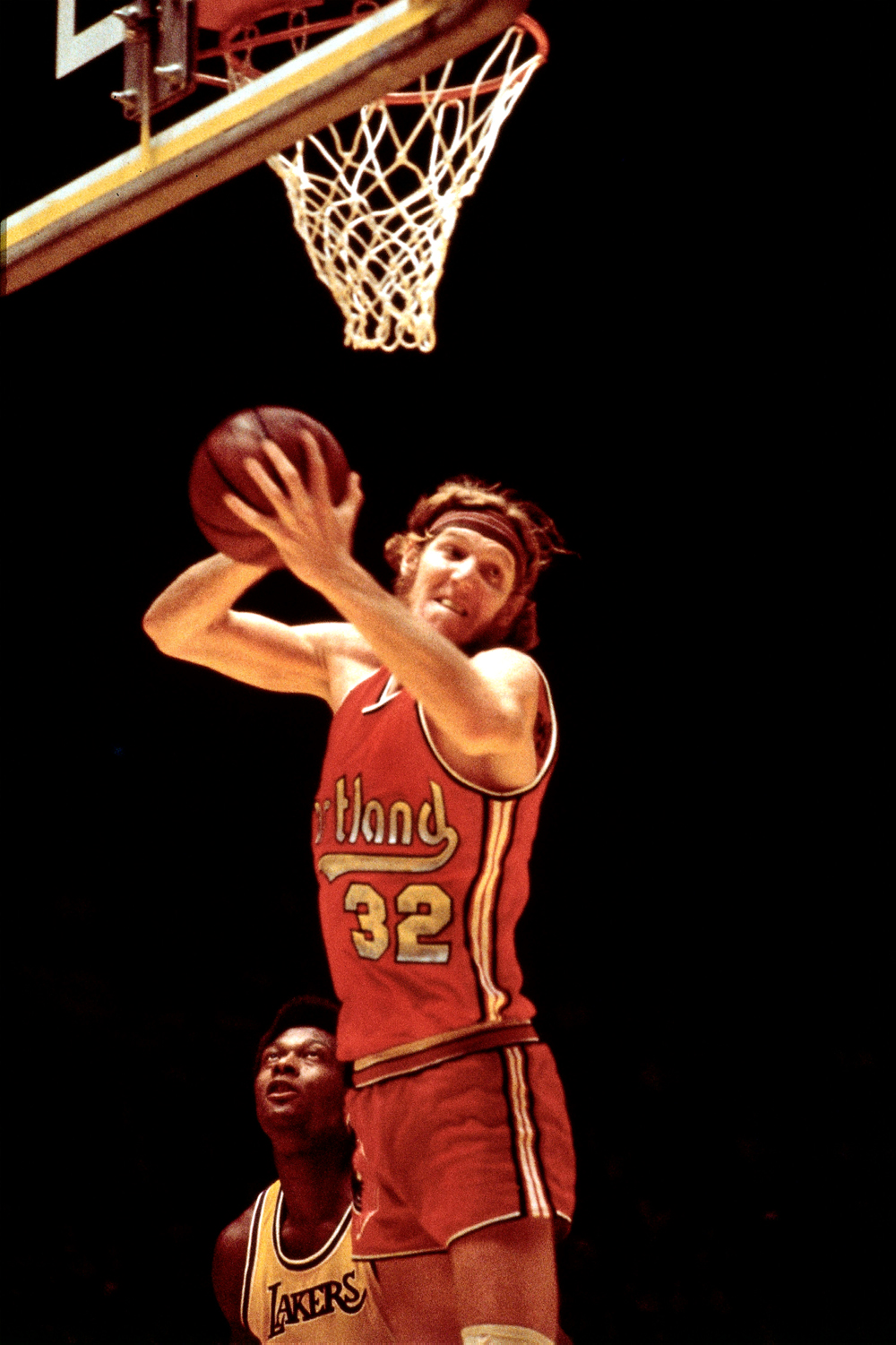
Bill Walton won the NBA Finals MVP in 1977 and was named the NBA Regular Season MVP in 1978 while with the Trail Blazers.

== 1974–1979: Bill Walton era ==
The Blazers did not beat their first season's record until they drafted Bill Walton from UCLA in 1974. In the first two years, under coach Lenny Wilkens, the Blazers improved, but still did not post a winning record (nor did they make the playoffs). In the 1976 off-season, Wilkens was fired and replaced with Jack Ramsay. In that off-season, four-time All-Star Sidney Wicks was sent to Boston and the team acquired forward Maurice Lucas in the dispersal draft that occurred when the American Basketball Association was acquired by the NBA.

=== 1977 championship ===
In the 1976–77 campaign, the Blazers posted their first winning record, going 49–33 under the leadership of Ramsay. Bill Walton led the NBA in both rebounding and blocked shots, and was named to the All-Defensive first team. The team—Walton at center, Lucas and Bob Gross at forward, and Dave Twardzik and Lionel Hollins at guard—made the playoffs for the first time. The Blazers won the NBA championship in their first time in the playoffs. After defeating the Chicago Bulls (who were a Western Conference team at the time) and the Denver Nuggets (a surviving ABA team) in the early rounds, the Blazers defeated the favored Los Angeles Lakers, led by Kareem Abdul-Jabbar, in four consecutive games. They then went on to defeat the Philadelphia 76ers 4–2 for the championship. Following his dominating performance, Walton was named MVP of the NBA finals.

The team started the 1977–78 season with a 50–10 mark, and some predicted a dynasty in Portland. Walton was named the league's regular season MVP and both he and Maurice Lucas were named to the NBA All-Defensive first team. A rash of injuries set in, however, most notably an injury to Bill Walton's foot that ended his season and would plague him over the remainder of his career. The team struggled to an 8–14 finish, and lost to the Seattle SuperSonics in the 1978 conference semifinals. That summer, Walton demanded to be traded to a team of his choice (Clippers, Knicks, Warriors, or 76ers) because he was unhappy with his medical treatment in Portland. Walton was never traded, and he held out the entire 1978–79 season and left the team as a free agent thereafter. Maurice Lucas left the team in 1980, and the Blazers "dynasty" was finished.

== The early 1980s ==
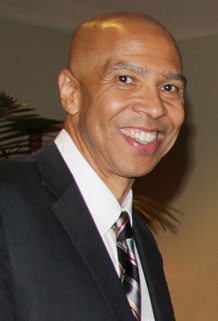
Selected by the Trail Blazers in 1979, Mychal Thompson played for Portland until 1986.

Despite the loss of several key players due to injury (most notably Walton, who left the team in 1979), the team continued to play competitive basketball. The sellout streak continued. The team continued to make the playoffs every year except for one (1981–1982), and on several occasions advanced past the first round. However, the NBA's Western Conference at that time was dominated by the L.A. Lakers (with a few Finals appearances by the Houston Rockets).

In the 1978 draft, the Blazers (for the third time in their history) landed the #1 pick in the draft; and selected Mychal Thompson, a center originally from the Bahamas. Over the next several years; the team acquired several other players who some thought could form the nucleus of a championship contender—Jim Paxson, T. R. Dunn, Fat Lever, and Wayne Cooper.

== 1983–1994: Clyde Drexler era ==
In 1983, the team selected Clyde Drexler, who would go on to a Hall of Fame career (eventually winning an NBA title with Houston).

Looking for help at center, the Blazers used the #2 pick in the 1984 draft to draft center Sam Bowie. Although Bowie had missed two full collegiate seasons due to leg injuries, the Blazers took him while Michael Jordan, Charles Barkley and John Stockton were all still on the board. Bowie suffered a series of leg injuries that limited his production for the team; he even missed the entire 1987–88 season due to injuries. Bowie is now considered one of the biggest draft busts in NBA history. The Blazers had far better luck with their second-round pick, Jerome Kersey, who would be one of the anchors of the franchise for a decade. That summer, the team sent Dunn, Lever, Cooper, Calvin Natt and two draft picks to the Denver Nuggets for forward Kiki Vandeweghe.

In 1985, the team selected point guard Terry Porter in the draft.

After several consecutive seasons of losing in the first round, the Ramsay Era ended in the summer of 1986 when the long-time coach was fired and replaced with Mike Schuler.

=== Summer of 1986 ===
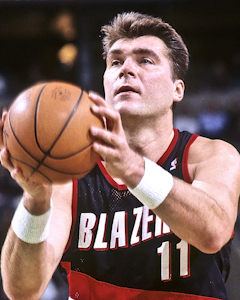
Drafted by Portland in 1986, Arvydas Sabonis would not play until 1995.

In the first round of the draft, the Blazers (who had two picks) selected forward Walter Berry out of St. John's and center Arvydas Sabonis out of the Soviet Union. Later in the draft, the team reached behind the Iron Curtain again, and chose guard Dražen Petrović from what was then Yugoslavia. Drafting two players from the Eastern Bloc was highly controversial—the Cold War was still going on, and some doubted that either player would be permitted to come play in the NBA. (The selection of Sabonis would become even more controversial in 1988, when the Lithuanian center was allowed to come to Portland to train, and then led the Soviet Union to a gold medal in the 1988 Summer Olympics in Seoul.)

After only a few months with the team, Berry was traded to the San Antonio Spurs for another rookie, center Kevin Duckworth.

=== 1986–1988: Mike Schuler era ===
Mike Schuler was hired prior to the start of the 1986–87 season as head coach of the Blazers. In his first two campaigns, the Schuler-led Blazers posted records of 49–33 (in 1986–87) and 53–29 (in 1987–88). Both teams made the playoffs (with home court advantage) but were defeated in the first round (to Houston in 1987, and to the Utah Jazz in 1988). In both years, the Blazers were among league leaders in scoring, but near the bottom of league rankings in defense and rebounding statistics.

The Schuler era was marked by several controversies regarding the starting lineup. The first such controversy occurred when Clyde Drexler won the starting guard spot over veteran Jim Paxson, who subsequently demanded (and got) a trade; eventually traded to Boston for Jerry Sichting. In the 1987–88 campaign, veteran center Steve Johnson was injured, and was replaced in the lineup by Duckworth, who went on to win the starting job from the foul-prone Johnson. As the team was winning, these controversies were glossed over at first.

=== 1988–1989: The season of change and Paul Allen's ownership ===
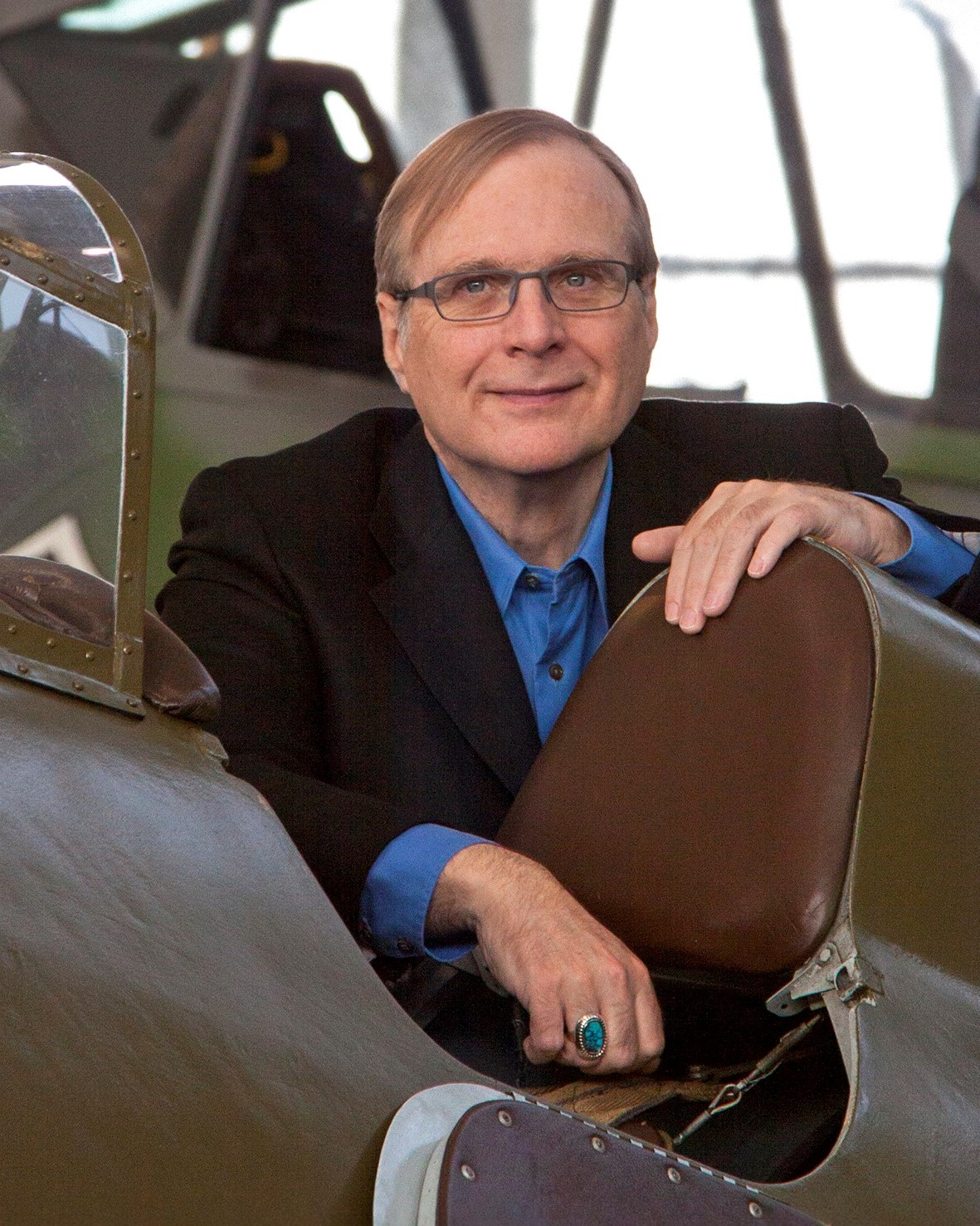
In 1988, Microsoft co-founder and Vulcan Inc. chairman Paul Allen purchased the Trail Blazers.

At the conclusion of the 1987–88 campaign, the team was purchased by current owner Paul Allen, the co-founder of Microsoft for $70 million from Larry Weinberg. The sale made Allen, then 35, the youngest team owner in all of the Big Four professional sports. The team quickly fell apart during the year, as the issue of who should start became paramount. In addition, a number of veterans were unhappy with Mike Schuler's coaching style; as a result the team limped to a 39–43 record and barely made the playoffs (where it was ousted by the Lakers 3–0 in the first round). Schuler was fired; assistant Rick Adelman was given the head coaching job on an interim basis.

That summer, Sam Bowie and a draft pick were traded to the New Jersey Nets for veteran forward Buck Williams, a respectable defensive and rebounding power forward. Vandeweghe was sent to the New York Knicks for a draft pick, and Johnson was taken by the expansion Minnesota Timberwolves in the expansion draft. Dražen Petrović was permitted by the Yugoslav authorities to come to Portland and join the team. For the second round of the draft, Portland selected a young forward from UConn, Clifford Robinson.

=== 1989–1992: Return to the finals ===
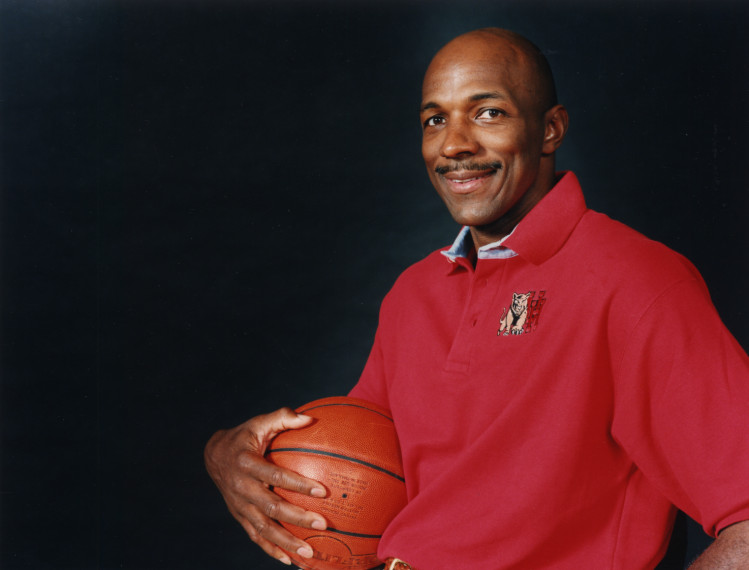
Clyde Drexler led Portland to two NBA Finals appearances in 1990 and 1992.

With the exception of the championship year of 1976–77 (and the following season), the early 1990s is generally regarded as the greatest era in team history. In the 1989–90 campaign, the team posted a 59–23 record, and defeated the Dallas Mavericks, San Antonio Spurs, and Phoenix Suns in the Western Conference playoffs. The team was ultimately defeated by the defending-champion Detroit Pistons, led by Bill Laimbeer and Isiah Thomas, 4–1.

That off-season, Petrović joined the New Jersey Nets, where he would perform at an All-Star level before his death in an auto accident in 1993. To replace him, the team signed free agent guard Danny Ainge, who had won three titles with the Boston Celtics in the 1980s. In the 1990–91 season, the Blazers posted a 63–19 record—the best in the league and the best in franchise history. They ended the Lakers' nine-year reign over the Pacific Division and won home-court advantage throughout the playoffs. The season ended when the Lakers defeated the Blazers 4–2 in the Western Conference finals.

In the 1991–92 campaign, the Blazers repeated as Pacific champions. They steamrolled through the Western Conference playoffs en route to a showdown with the Chicago Bulls in the Finals—one that they lost 4–2, and which cemented the reputations of both Jordan and Drexler (placing the latter firmly in the former's shadow).

=== 1992–1994: End of the Adelman era ===
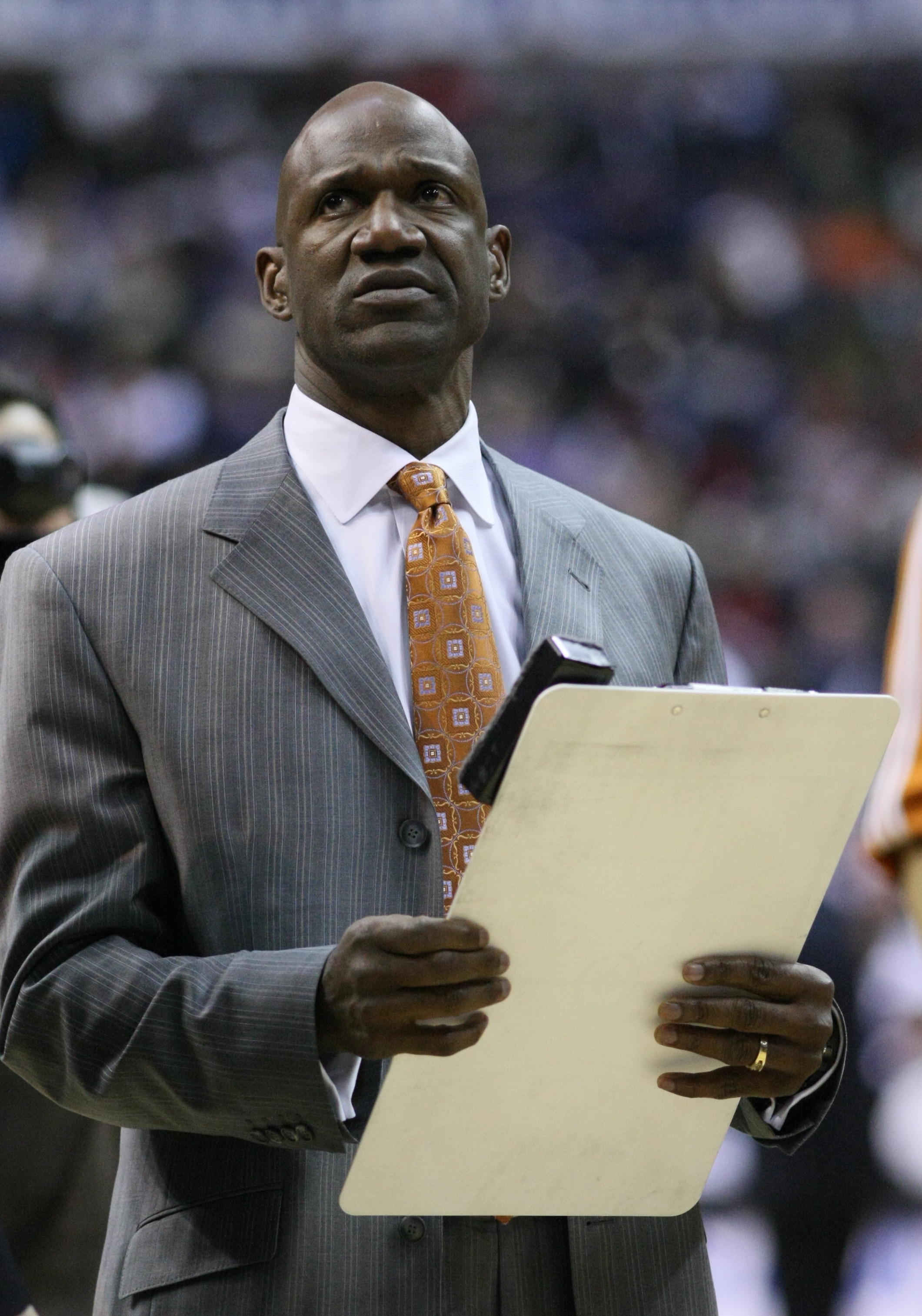
After serving as Portland's starting point guard for several seasons, Terry Porter was bumped from the lineup during the 1993–94 season for Rod Strickland.

After the 1991–92 campaign, Ainge left for Phoenix and became a major player in the Suns' run to the finals in the following season. To replace him in the backcourt, the Trail Blazers signed free agent guard Rod Strickland from the Spurs.

In 1992–1993, a series of injuries and other issues started to plague the team. Duckworth, Drexler, Kersey, and Buck Williams began to drop in performance and Drexler and Kersey missed a combined 50 games due to injury. Despite this, the team posted a 51–31 record and landed a spot in the Western Conference finals. They were defeated by the San Antonio Spurs in the first round, 1–3. Owner Paul Allen started breaking ground on the Rose Garden, which would replace the Memorial Coliseum as the team's home stadium.

During this season, several Blazers players were involved in a sexual assault case involving minors. Utah police investigated 6 Blazer players for sexually assaulting two 16-year-old girls in Salt Lake City. The minors reported to have met with the men at a hotel at night and engaged in sexual relations. Dave Johnson, Tracy Murray, Reggie Smith and Jerome Kersey were connected to the case. Criminal charges were not pressed due to a lack of evidence. Johnson and Murray were fined and suspended without pay for three games, and Kersey and Smith were fined. The Blazers senior vice president for operations at the time, Geoff Petrie, released a statement:

“We do not take breaches of our policies or team rules lightly and feel deep regret that some of our players have shown poor judgment, and for that we apologize,” Both Kersey and Smith publicly released apologies, but denied performing stagetory rape. Murray and Johnson have not publicly spoken on the situation.

In the 1993–94 season, Terry Porter suffered an injury and was replaced in the starting lineup with Strickland. Duckworth was traded in the off-season to the Washington Bullets for forward Harvey Grant. To replace Duckworth, center Chris Dudley was signed to a one-year contract, a deal that NBA commissioner, David Stern, viewed as an attempt to circumvent the league's salary cap. They ended the season with a 49-33 and made it to the Western Conference finals. They were defeated by the Houston Rockets in the first round, 1–3.Adelman was fired and replaced with Seton Hall coach P. J. Carlesimo.

== 1994–1996: Bob Whitsitt era ==
The 1994–95 season was the first in the reign of "Trader", Bob Whitsitt. At the time, Whitsitt was viewed as one of the smartest executives in the NBA for leveraging the salary cap and other details of the collective bargaining agreement between the NBA and its players. He was known mostly for his work with the Seattle SuperSonics. After a falling-out with Sonics' owner Barry Ackerley, Whitsitt was hired by Paul Allen to rebuild the team.

The 1994–95 was also the last Blazers season for Clyde Drexler, ending an 11-year run at the franchise. Drexler was traded in the middle of the season to the Houston Rockets for Otis Thorpe and a draft pick. He went on to lead the Houston Rockets to a second consecutive NBA title. He is regarded as one of the best Blazers player's in franchise history and his number (22) was retired in 2001. The 1994–95 campaign was also the last year in the Memorial Coliseum.

The Blazers that year were an above-average defensive team but a poor offensive one. They posted a 44–38 record and were swept by Phoenix in the first round of the playoffs.

In 1995–96, the team moved into their new home stadium, the Rose Garden, now the Moda Center. The team was led in scoring by Robinson. Bob Whitsitt got into contact with Lithuanian center Arvydas Sabonis, from Real Madrid Baloncesto in the EuroLeague. Sabonis had several previous injuries, which was an initial concern of the coaching staff, but he ended up being signed to the Blazers. Sabonis averaged 14.5 points, 8.1 rebounds & 24 minutes per game during his rookie year and won NBA All-Rookie First Team in 1996. The Blazers finished the season with a 44–38 record, and were defeated by the Utah Jazz, 3–2, in the Western Conference finals. In game five of the series, the Blazers were defeated 102–64, setting a record at the time for the fewest points scored in a playoff game. This season marked the final year for forward Buck Williams, a prominent player for the team's two championship runs.

== 1996–2000: Wallace & Pippen ==
The 1996 off-season had several roster changes for the Blazers. Strickland and Harvey Grant demanded to be traded, and was sent to the Washington Bullets, now known as the Washington Wizards. In return, the team received forward Rasheed Wallace, who would become one of the best players in franchise history. Isaiah Rider from the Minnesota Timberwolves was also traded to the team, but was quickly traded away for Smith after being cited for marijuana possession. To replace Strickland, the Blazers signed playground legend Kenny Anderson to a free-agent contract. In the 1996 draft that year, the team selected high schooler Jermaine O'Neal as a first round pick, 17th overall.

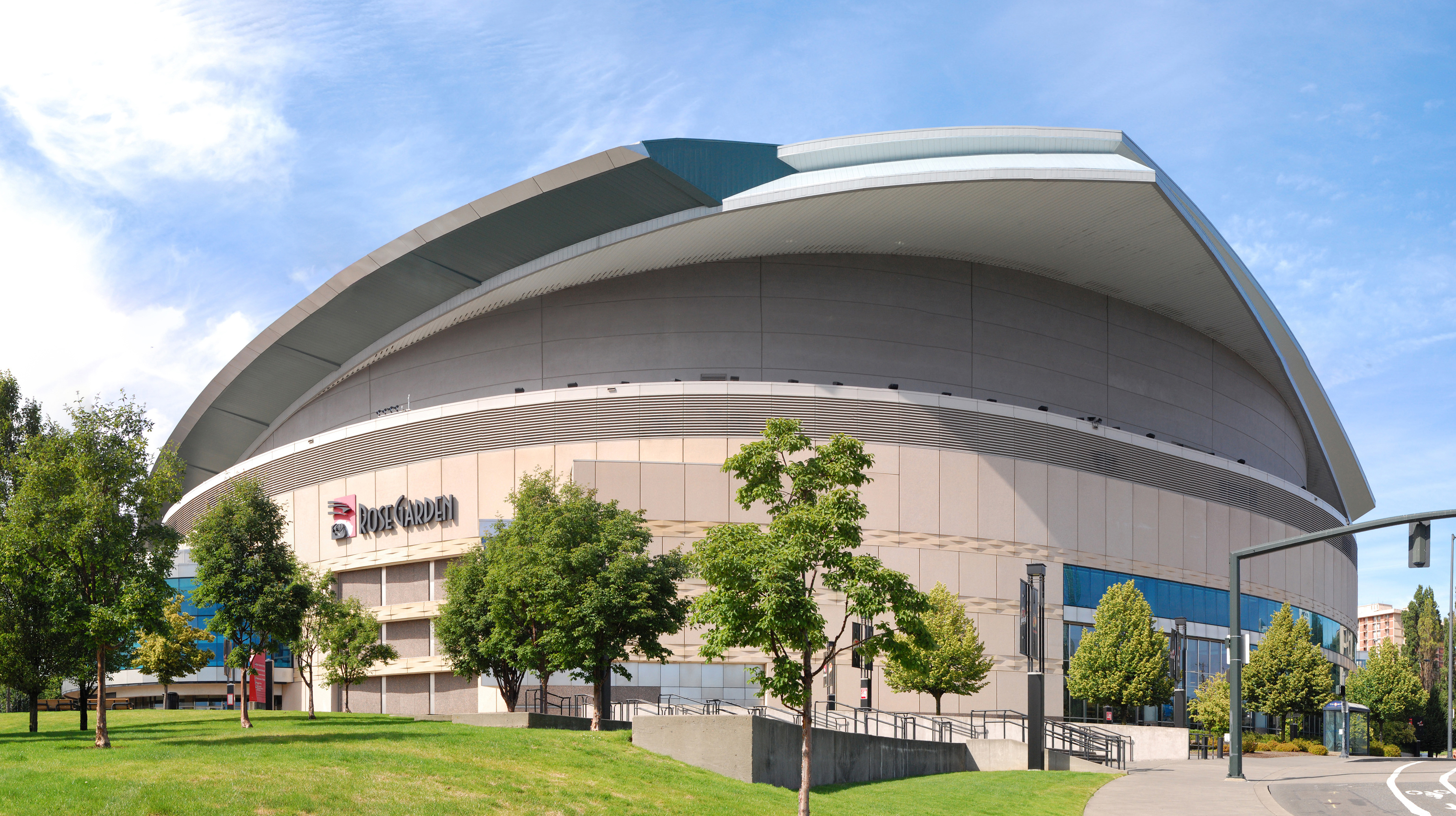
The Rose Garden, now known as the Moda Center, opened in 1995.

Carlesimo was fired and replaced with Mike Dunleavy in 1997. In addition to Dunleavy, the 1997–98 campaign saw two other important new faces: forward Brian Grant who was signed as a free agent in the off-season, and guard Damon Stoudamire, who was acquired in a mid-season trade with the Toronto Raptors for Anderson. In his first NBA seasons with Toronto, the Portland native won Rookie of the Year honors and posted All-Star quality numbers for the Raptors, and reminded some of a young Isiah Thomas. Some expected that "Mighty Mouse" would become the franchise player the team had lacked since Drexler left. Clifford Robinson would also leave the team and join as a free-agent on the Phoenix Suns.

In the abbreviated 1999 season, the Blazers advanced to their third conference final of the decade, only to be swept by the Spurs. The tone was punctuated in Game 2 of the series, when Spurs forward Sean Elliott hit a game-winning 3-pointer, which is referred to as the "Memorial Day Miracle." That off-season, the Blazers made one of the franchise's most notable acquisitions, making a blockbuster (six-for-one) trade for six-time NBA champion Scottie Pippen after his Houston Rockets stint.

In 1999-2000 the team ended the season with a 59–23 record, 2nd seed for the West and sent them to the conference finals. With Stoudamire, Anderson, Pippen, Wallace, Sabonis and Grant, they finished with the second-best record in the league. In Western Conference finals, they played against the Los Angeles Lakers with Kobe Bryant and Shaquille O'Neal. The Blazers were defeated in the series 4–3, ending their playoff campaign.

== 2000–2003: The Jail Blazers ==
The Trail Blazers made a series of personnel moves in the 2000 and 2001 off-seasons that failed to produce results. Jermaine O'Neal was traded to the Indiana Pacers for Dale Davis and would go on to become an 6-time All-Star, while Brian Grant was traded to the Miami Heat in a three-team deal that brought in Shawn Kemp from the Cleveland Cavaliers, thus reuniting him with Whitsitt. Finally, the Blazers signed free agent forward Ruben Patterson, a controversial decision due to his criminal background.

With the new lineup, the team won 42 of their first 60 games. After Wells suffered a season-ending injury, disfunction, and moves that backfired completely - like signing point guard Rod Strickland, the team plummeted in the standings and was swept in three games by the Lakers in the first round - a year removed from being one game away from the NBA finals. That offseason, the churning continued; Dunleavy was fired, and replaced with Maurice Cheeks, a "players' coach" who some thought would relate better to the players than Dunleavy did. More transactions followed as the Blazers traded Steve Smith to the Spurs for Derek Anderson.

A particular criticism was that Whitsitt was assembling a championship-contending roster of stars while turning a blind eye to team chemistry and bad sportsmanship. Longtime NBA coach and analyst, Doug Collins, referred to Whitsitt as a "rotisserie-league manager." A fan was ejected from the Rose Garden for holding up a banner that said "Trade Whitsitt,". Mainstream media began referring to the team as "Jail Blazers" due to behavioral issues among the players of the franchise during this time. Ruben Patterson joined the team, who had previously pleaded no contest to a felony sexual assault charge and was required to register as a sex offender. Several players including Wallace, Stoudamire, and Qyntel Woods, were cited for marijuana possession. Woods pleaded guilty to first-degree animal abuse for staging dog fights in his house, involving his pit bulls, Hollywood and Sugar. The dogs confiscated, Woods was given 80 hours of community service and donated $10,000 to the Oregon Humane Society. Rasheed Wallace was suspended for seven games for threatening a referee. In 2003, Zach Randolph reportedly attacked Patterson during a practice, fracturing bones around his eye socket.

In 2024, Rasheed Wallace recalled another event leading up to the punch on Gilbert Arenas podcast, Gil's Arena, in which he described a time Patterson aggressively slammed Randolph into the ground in their locker room. In 2004, Portland police responded to a security alarm at Stoudamire's home and ended up finding a pound of marijuana in a crawlspace while searching the premises. The police search was later declared illegal and all charges were dropped. Guard Bonzi Wells famously told Sports Illustrated in a 2002 interview:

We're not really going to worry about what the hell (the fans) think about us. They really don't matter to us. They can boo us everyday, but they're still going to ask for our autographs if they see us on the street. That's why they're fans, and we're NBA players.

The team's problematic behavior and misconduct resulted in disapproval by fans, and attendance at the Rose Garden started to decline. In the summer of 2003, with attendance declining, issues between players, and an exorbitant payroll, Whitsitt announced that he would leave the team to focus on Paul Allen's other franchise, the Seattle Seahawks.

== 2003–2004: The Patterson/Nash era ==
Steven Patterson and general manager John Nash joined the organization began to rebrand the franchise in hopes of cleaning up the team's image after the several instances of misconduct and aggression from the players. A "25 point pledge" was announced to fans as a standard they'd be held to; code of conduct with 25 steps the organization would take to promote sportsmanship. The Blazers' draft pick that year was Travis Outlaw, the son of a police officer, which was suspected to be an aid in rebranding the team.

In the 2003–04 season, Bonzi Wells cussed out Cheeks during practice, which led to a suspension. He was soon traded to the Memphis Grizzlies for Wesley Person and a first-round pick. In an interview with the Oregonian, Rasheed Wallace claimed that the NBA exploited African American players after the media nicknamed the team the "Jailblazers". Wallace's claims were denounced by the team, and the league.

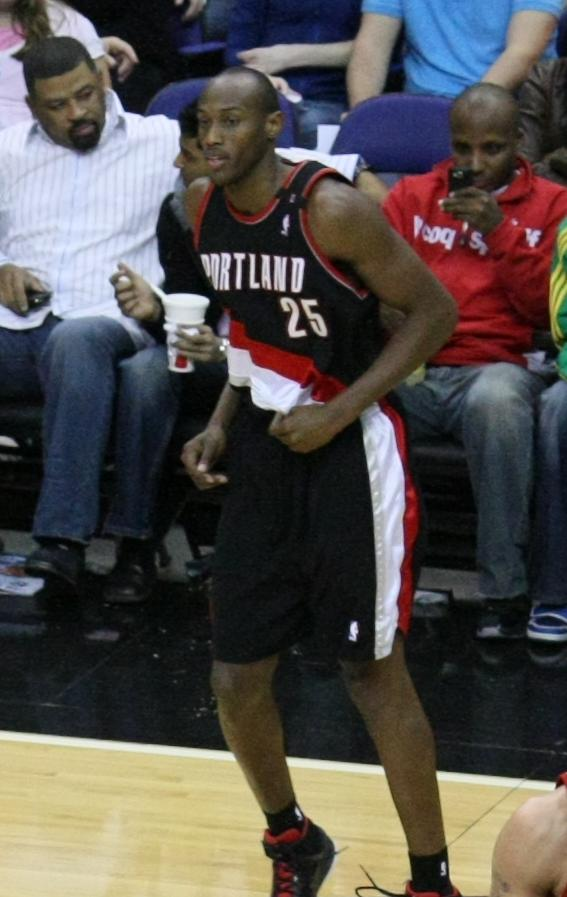
Drafted in 2003 by the Trail Blazers, Travis Outlaw played for Portland until 2010.

During the season, point guard Jeff McInnis was sent to Cleveland with Ruben Boumtje-Boumtje for forward Darius Miles. Wallace was sent to the Atlanta Hawks along with Person for forward Shareef Abdur-Rahim, center Theo Ratliff and Dan Dickau. The team ended the season with a 41–41 record and missed the playoffs for the first time since 1981. The Blazers' had 21 straight playoff appearances was the second longest in the NBA, behind the 76ers's 22 consecutive playoff appearances.

== 2004–2005 ==
The team selected Sebastian Telfair, a high-school player from New York City, with its first draft pick. The team also selected two European players, Viktor Khryapa and Sergei Monia, with later picks, as well as Korean center Ha Seung-Jin in the second round. Three players—Darius Miles, Ratliff, and Zach Randolph—were given large contract extensions in the summer of 2004. Dale Davis was traded to the Golden State Warriors for also-disgruntled guard Nick Van Exel, and center Joel Przybilla was signed to a free agent contract.

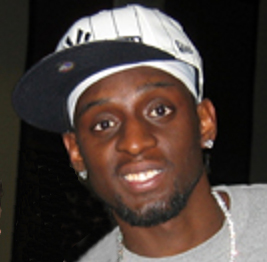
Darius Miles played for the Trail Blazers from 2004 to 2006. He was on the team's roster until he was waived in 2008.

When the season started, the starting lineup consisted of Ratliff, Randolph, Abdur-Rahim, Stoudamire, and Anderson. For the early part of the season, the team played mostly a .500 record and could not win a game for more than 2 consecutive games. Multiple players suffered injuries, Anderson, Abdur-Rahim, and Randolph, who missed several games. In addition, the team's home facility filed for bankruptcy became a major distraction for the franchise. Television ratings also fell through.

On March 2, 2005, Cheeks was fired and replaced on an interim basis by director of player personnel Kevin Pritchard. More playing time was given to a cast of young players including Telfair, Travis Outlaw, Khryapa, Przybilla, and Ha. The team qualified for the lottery.

=== Financial difficulties ===
At the end of the 2003 season, after which Bob Whitsitt resigned, the franchise was public about its financial issues. Several players viewed by some as "assets" were traded or allowed to depart via free agency with no attempt to re-sign them. Oregon Arena Corp., the Blazers' sister company, declared bankruptcy in 2004. Because of the bankruptcy, owner Paul Allen lost control of the Rose Garden, which was turned over to the creditors.

In February 2006, team management went public with the claim that without the revenue from the Rose Garden, the Blazers have found it difficult to turn a profit. NBA Commissioner David Stern stated, "My goal on behalf of the league would be to keep the team in Portland, playing in the Rose Garden, with economic prospects that make some financial sense." The Blazers are contractually obligated to play in the Rose Garden until 2023. However, some believe a bankruptcy filing, were it to occur, and might eliminate any restrictions on the team's ability to relocate. Allen put the Blazers up for sale during the season, receiving several bids for the franchise, but took it off the market in August 2006.

== 2005–2006 ==
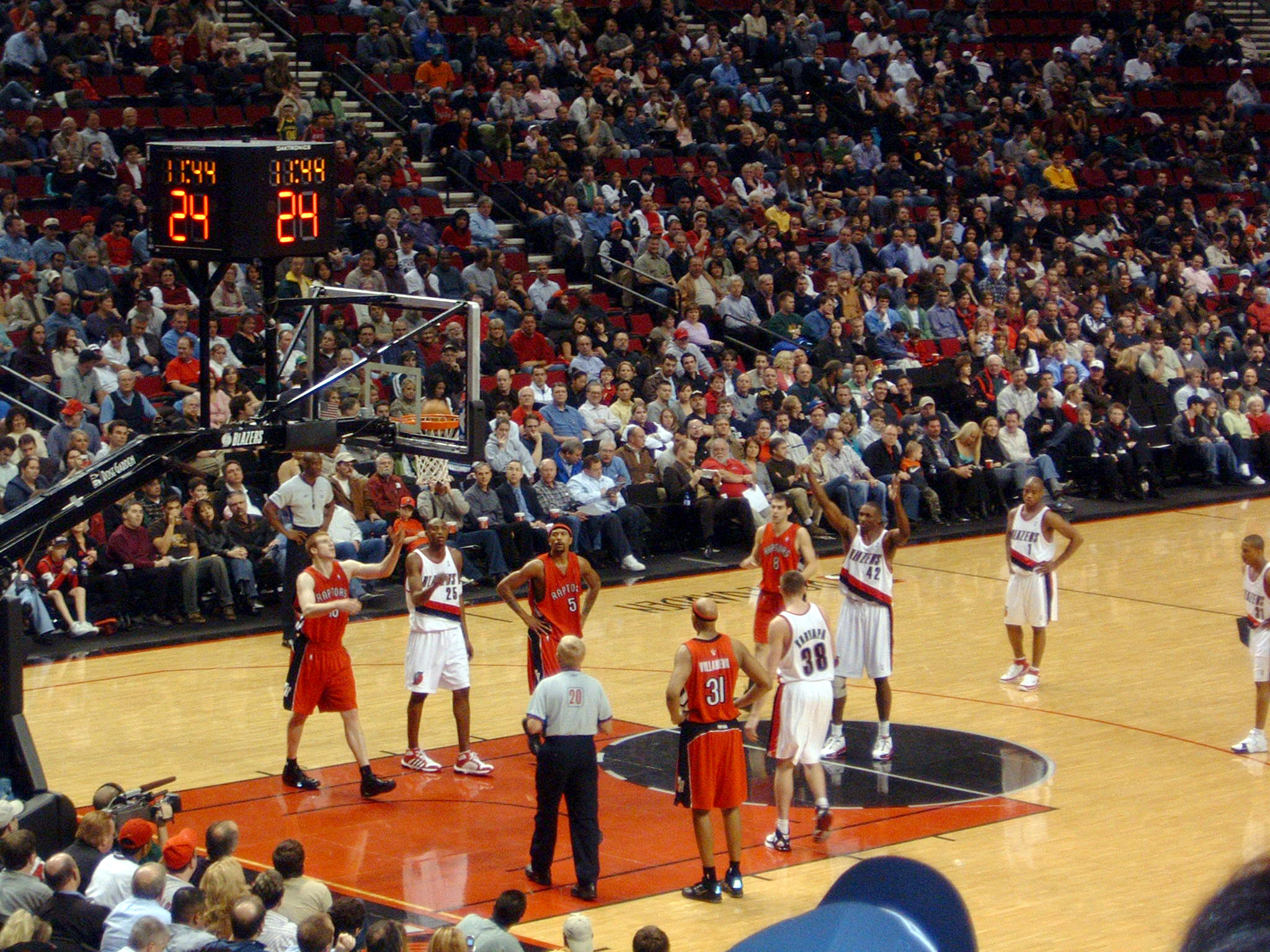
A game at the Rose Garden (now Moda Center) during the 2005–06 season.

In July 2005, the Blazers announced the hiring of Nate McMillan as their new head basketball coach, ending a several-month-long search. Other candidates for the position included Marc Iavaroni, Terry Porter, and Lionel Hollins.

The Blazers won the #3 pick in the 2005 draft. On draft day, however, the team traded the pick to the Utah Jazz for the #6 and #27 picks in the 2005 draft, and a conditional pick in the 2006 draft (belonging initially to the Detroit Pistons). The Blazers used the #6 pick to draft Martell Webster. The 27th pick was used to draft Linas Kleiza, and the 35th pick (the Blazers' own) was used to draft Ricky Sánchez. The 27th and 35th picks were traded on draft night for the Denver Nuggets #22 pick, Jarrett Jack.

=== 2005–2006 season ===
Several controversies arose during the 2005–06 season. Sebastian Telfair, had issues with McMillan. Forward Ruben Patterson engaged in several public battles struggles with McMillan and earned a lengthy suspension from the team. Zach Randolph, recovering from a knee injury, was criticized for his alleged poor work ethic. Darius Miles also had issues with McMillan, including a game where he changed into street clothes at halftime in protest of lack of playing time. Both Miles and Randolph publicly requested trades, and Randolph later apologized. In May 2006, Miles gave an interview with The Oregonian reporter Jason Quick in which he admitted to coming to practice with alcohol on his breath. Telfair, Miles, Randolph, Theo Ratliff, and Joel Przybilla also spent significant minutes out with injuries. The Blazers finished the season 21–61, the worst in the NBA, and landed the fourth pick in the 2006 NBA draft.

== 2006–2012: LaMarcus Aldridge and Brandon Roy era ==
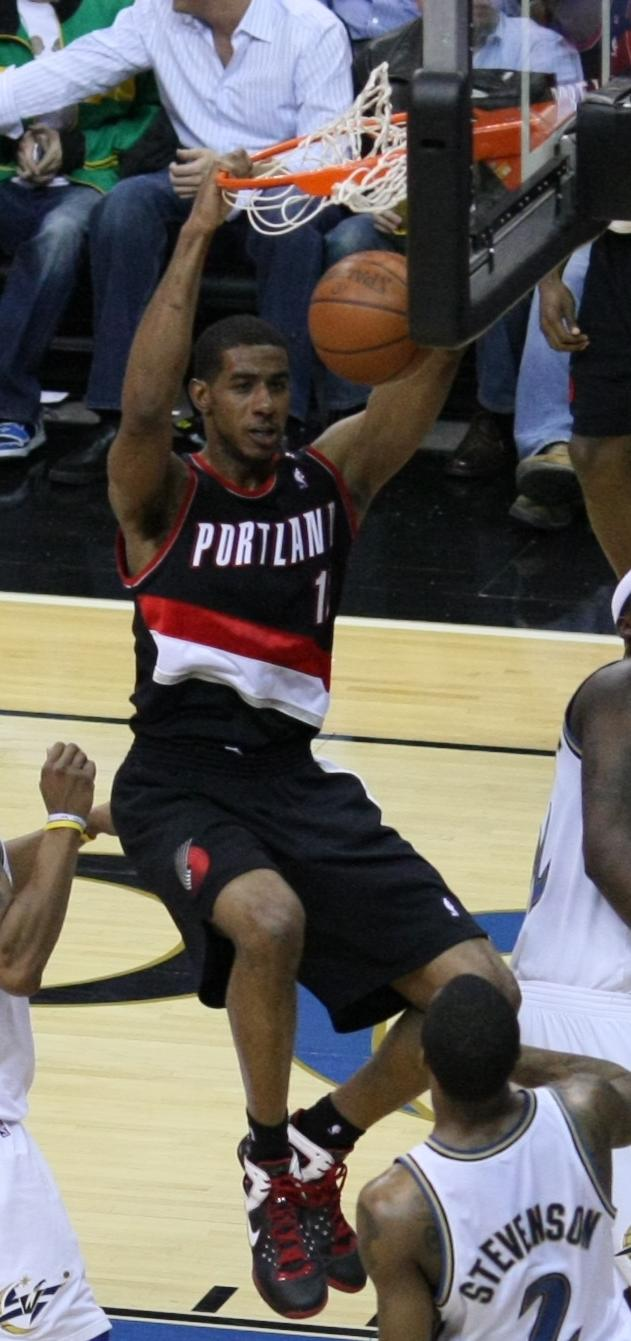
LaMarcus Aldridge was a four time NBA All-Star (2012–15) during his Blazers tenure.

In the 2006 NBA draft the Blazers traded Viktor Khryapa and draft rights for Tyrus Thomas for draft rights to LaMarcus Aldridge. The Blazers picked Brandon Roy 6th in the draft.

In the spring of 2007, Steve Patterson resigned as team president, and Paul Allen entered into an agreement to re-purchase the Rose Garden. On the court, the team finished with a 32–50 record, an 11-game improvement, and rookie shooting guard Roy was named the 2006–07 Rookie of the Year. That summer Pritchard was promoted to general manager, and former Nike Inc. executive Larry Miller was hired as team president. The Blazers won the 2007 NBA Draft Lottery and selected Ohio State center Greg Oden with the No. 1 pick in the draft. Some had speculated that they might choose Kevin Durant instead; Durant was picked at No. 2 by regional rivals the Seattle SuperSonics. Oden suffered a pre-season knee injury requiring microfracture surgery, and missed the entire 2007–08 season. Oden's constant battle with injuries and Durant's success resulted in comparisons to the Blazers' selection of Sam Bowie over Michael Jordan in 1984.

They had a 13-game winning streak that began in early December, resulting in a 13–2 record, an NBA best, for the month of December. McMillan won NBA Coach of the Month honors, and Roy garnered NBA Western Conference Player of the Week honors in back-to-back weeks (the first Trail Blazer to accomplish the feat since Clyde Drexler in the 1990–91 season). Roy was also named as a reserve for the 2008 NBA All-Star Game, the first All-Star for the Blazers since Rasheed Wallace in 2001. The Blazers finished the season 41–41, their best record since the 2003–04 season.

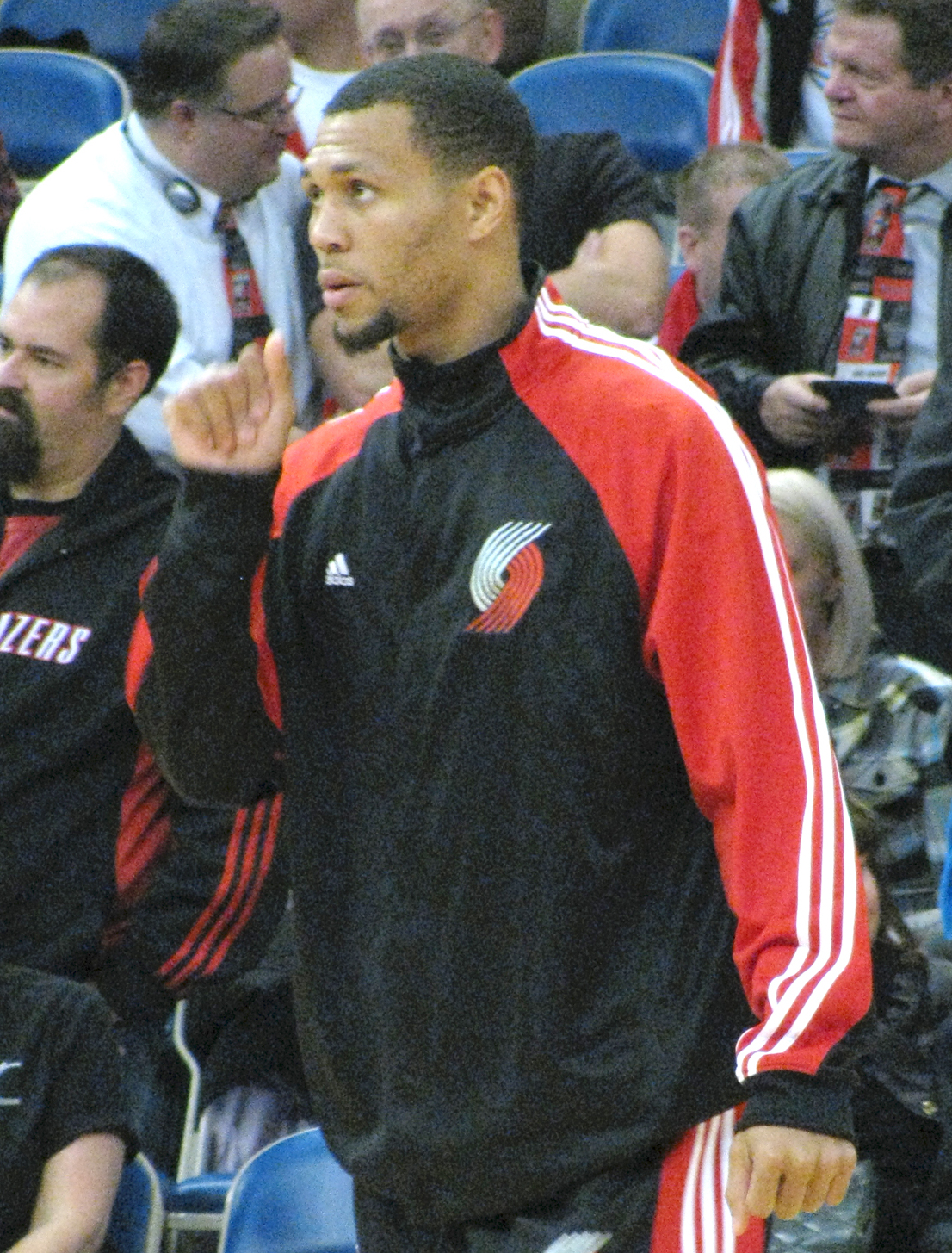
Brandon Roy was the 2006–07 NBA Rookie of the Year.

The 2008–09 season, Greg Oden debuted with the Blazers, playing in 61 games. Portland welcomed Spanish swingman Rudy Fernández, and French-native Nicolas Batum. Roy appeared in his second straight All-Star Game, and Fernández competed in the Sprite Slam Dunk Contest during NBA All-Star Weekend. Roy had a career-high 52 points against the Phoenix Suns and game-winning shots against the Houston Rockets and New York Knicks. The Blazers clinched a playoff berth for the first time since 2003 and achieved a 54–28 record, their first winning record since the 2002–03 season. As the fourth seed and holding home-court advantage, the Trail Blazers played the fifth-seeded Houston Rockets in the 2009 Playoffs, losing the playoff series 4 games to 2. Some credited Portland's loss in the first round to the team's young age and inexperience. However, the 2008–09 season was most notable for the inspiring team chemistry on and off the court, for the potential for a young, energetic group in the upcoming seasons, and for bringing respect back to the franchise – attributes that fans had been missing for over a decade.

In the 2009 off-season, the Trail Blazers traded the No. 24 pick to Dallas for the No. 22 pick and selected Víctor Claver. They also selected Villanova forward Dante Cunningham with the No. 33 pick, Jon Brockman and guard Patrick Mills. Brockman was traded to the Kings in exchange for No. 31 pick Jeff Pendergraph. Free agent Channing Frye signed with the Phoenix Suns and Sergio Rodríguez was traded to the Kings. The Blazers attempted to sign free agent small forward Hedo Türkoğlu, who led the Orlando Magic to the 2009 NBA Finals, but after a verbal agreement he decided to sign with the Toronto Raptors. The Blazers then attempted to sign restricted free agent Paul Millsap; however, their offer was matched by the Utah Jazz. On July 24, 2009, the Trail Blazers signed point guard Andre Miller.

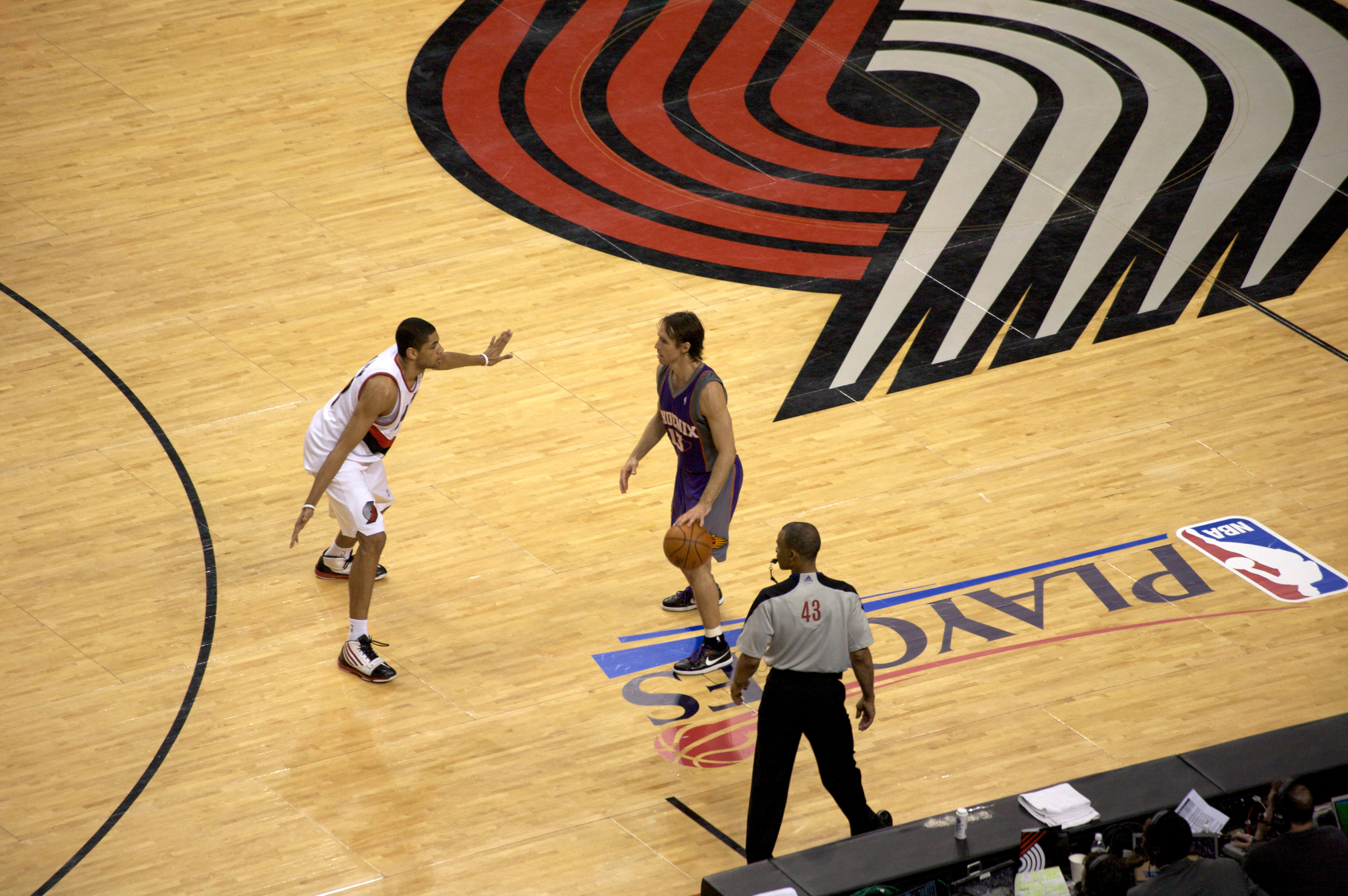
A 2010 NBA Playoffs game at the Rose Garden (now Moda Center).

Reserves Nicolas Batum and Rudy Fernández started the season on the inactive list and forward Travis Outlaw soon followed after a serious foot injury early in the season. Centers Greg Oden and Joel Przybilla suffered season-ending knee injuries in December, while Brandon Roy and LaMarcus Aldridge played through shoulder, hamstring, ankle and knee injuries respectively. Head Coach Nate McMillan also suffered a ruptured Achilles tendon during practice. Because of the void at the center position, Blazers general manager Kevin Pritchard worked out a deal to acquire Marcus Camby from the Los Angeles Clippers in exchange for Steve Blake and Travis Outlaw. Although wins did not come as easily as the season before, the Blazers rallied to finish at 50–32, and placed 6th in the West. Brandon Roy underwent surgery after suffering a torn meniscus in his right knee, but returned for Game 4 of the first-round series against the Phoenix Suns. However, the accumulation of injuries was too much to bear, and the short-handed Trail Blazers lost the series 4–2 to the Suns.

During the 2010 off-season, the Blazers' front office experienced significant personnel changes beginning in July with the announcement of new general manager Rich Cho, succeeding former general manager Kevin Pritchard, who was relieved of his duties after the 2010 NBA draft. Cho became the first general manager of Asian descent in NBA history.

On August 12, the Trail Blazers signed two new assistant general managers, Bill Branch and Steve Rosenberry. Branch and Rosenberry replaced former assistant general manager Tom Penn, who was released by Portland in March. The organization also made changes to Nate McMillan's coaching staff by hiring Bernie Bickerstaff, Bob Ociepka and Buck Williams with Bickerstaff assuming the lead Assistant Coach position due to the departure of Monty Williams.

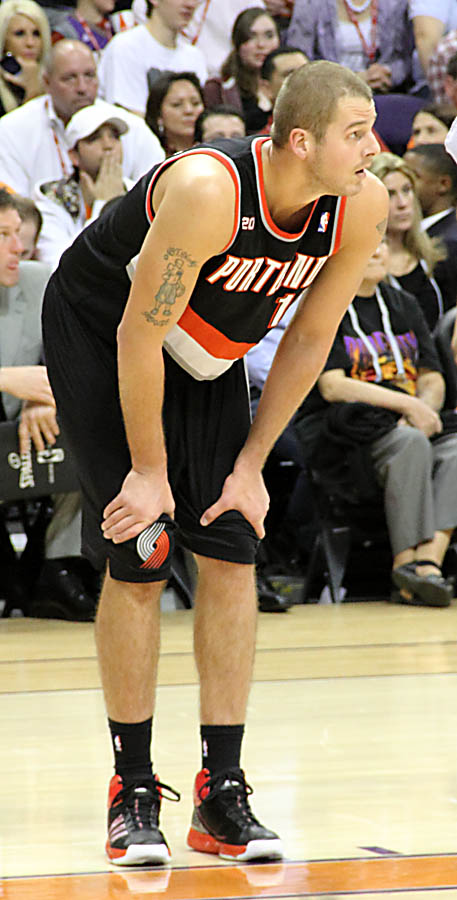
Joel Przybilla played for the Trail Blazers at two separate points in his career. (2004–11, 2012)

The Blazers acquired rookies Armon Johnson, Luke Babbitt, and Elliot Williams from the 2010 NBA draft and off-season trades. On July 21, Wesley Matthews signed a five-year deal with the Blazers after his former team, the Utah Jazz, declined to match their offer.

In October, former Blazer Maurice Lucas died due to cancer. The 2010–11 Blazers team honored him by wearing No. 20 patches on their jerseys for the season.

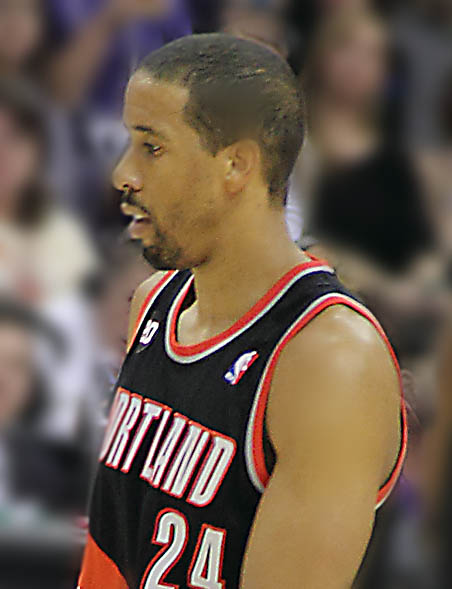
After signing with Portland in 2009, Andre Miller played his final season with the Trail Blazers during the 2010–11 season.

In 2010–11 season, Jeff Pendergraph and rookie guard Elliot Williams both suffered knee injuries that sidelined them for the season; Portland later waived Pendergraph. In November, they announced that Oden would have microfracture surgery on his left knee, ending his 2010–2011 season. This injury marked Oden's third NBA season cut short due to a knee injury. Three-time All-Star Brandon Roy underwent double-arthroscopic surgery on January 17, 2011, to repair both knees after dealing with constant struggles, leaving his future up in the air. Just days after, Marcus Camby also underwent arthroscopic knee surgery to repair his left knee.

Despite struggles with injury, Portland performed at a playoff level throughout the season. LaMarcus Aldridge emerged as the focal point of the team and posted career-high numbers, as well as Western Conference Player of the Week and Month honors. Wesley Matthews also emerged in the absence of Brandon Roy, proving his worth as the Blazers' key off-season addition. Believing the team could make a significant run in the playoffs, Cho executed his first major trade on February 24, 2011, just seven minutes before the deadline. The Trail Blazers sent forward Dante Cunningham, center Joel Przybilla and center Sean Marks to the Charlotte Bobcats in return for former All-Star and All-Defensive forward Gerald Wallace. The emergence of Aldridge and the play of Matthews kept the Blazers competitive, sealing another playoff berth by winning 48 games. However, like in their last two postseasons, the Blazers were eliminated in six games of the first round, this time against the eventual champions, the Dallas Mavericks.

During the 2011 off-season, the Blazers released Cho, supposedly due to communication and "chemistry issues" with owner Paul Allen. Director of Scouting Chad Buchanan took over as acting interim General Manager. The dismissal of Cho was criticized by Sports Illustrated as "illogical", although they noted that Allen had done a lot of questionable moves during his tenure as team owner.

On June 23, 2011, in the NBA Draft, the Trail Blazers drafted guards Nolan Smith from Duke University with the 21st selection and Jon Diebler from Ohio State University with the 51st selection. On the same day, the Blazers front office had made a three-team trade with the Denver Nuggets and Dallas Mavericks. The trade sent Blazers guards Andre Miller to Denver and Rudy Fernández to Dallas along with international player Petteri Koponen, who had yet to make an appearance for Portland; Denver then sent guard Raymond Felton to Portland and Denver also received rookie forward Jordan Hamilton from Dallas as well as a future second-round pick from Portland.

Due to the 2011 NBA lockout, team transactions were on hold until early December and a shortened 66-game schedule was created. On December 9, 2011, pre-season training camp began along with the free agency market. That morning it was made public that Portland's three-time All-Star guard Brandon Roy would retire due to chronic knee problems. Additionally, center Greg Oden was diagnosed with yet another setback involving his ongoing knee issues. Forward LaMarcus Aldridge, who was diagnosed with Wolff-Parkinson-White Syndrome in 2007, underwent a similar procedure to correct the heart problem after diagnosis earlier that day. Blazers interim GM Chad Buchanan signed three free agents the week before Portland's first exhibition game. On December 11, Portland agreed to terms with veteran forward-center Kurt Thomas to help fill the frontcourt void in the roster. In need of a scoring wingman after the departure of Roy and Fernandez, the Blazers signed 2010 NBA Sixth Man of the Year Winner Jamal Crawford on December 15 by using the new NBA Amnesty Clause on Roy. Later that day, the Blazers signed a third free agent, forward Craig Smith. After getting off to a 7–2 start and recognition as a growing power in the Western Conference, the team quickly began to collapse. Starting point guard Raymond Felton, among others, struggled with McMillan's new approach to a running-style offense. The team gained some notability as Aldridge was named to his first All-Star Game. Despite Aldridge's solid performance, the rest of the team became more inconsistent.

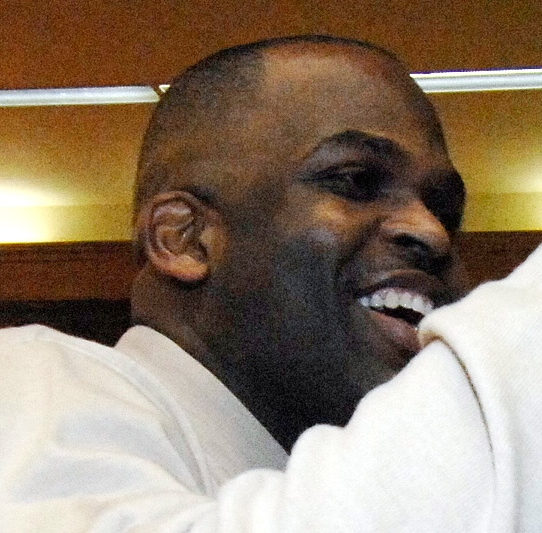
Nate McMillan was Portland's head coach from 2005 to 2012.

On March 15, 2012, The Portland Trail Blazers made several moves, including two trades before the 3 pm EST deadline. Center Marcus Camby was sent to the Houston Rockets in exchange for center Hasheem Thabeet and point guard Jonny Flynn. Portland also received Houston's second-round draft pick in the 2012 NBA Draft. Portland then traded forward Gerald Wallace to the New Jersey Nets for center Mehmet Okur, forward Shawne Williams, and New Jersey's first-round, top-3-protected pick in the 2012 NBA draft. All four players acquired in the trades held expiring contracts, meaning they would be free agents at the end of the season. Oden was released from the roster after playing a total of 82 games in five NBA seasons, being cut along with Chris Johnson in order to make room for the incoming traded players. Finally, head coach Nate McMillan was also fired, leaving the franchise with the third-most coaching wins, behind Jack Ramsay and Rick Adelman. Portland named Kaleb Canales as the interim head coach for the rest of the 2011–2012 NBA season. A few days later, Portland claimed forward J. J. Hickson off waivers from the Sacramento Kings. After shaking up the roster and limping to the end of the regular season with a 28–38 record and finishing out of playoff contention for the first time in three years, the team entered the offseason on the search for a general manager and new head coach.

At the 2012 NBA draft lottery on May 30, the Blazers secured the number 6 pick of the draft via the Brooklyn Nets from the Gerald Wallace trade, and also ended up with the number 11 pick due to their own record.

== 2012–2023: The Damian Lillard era ==
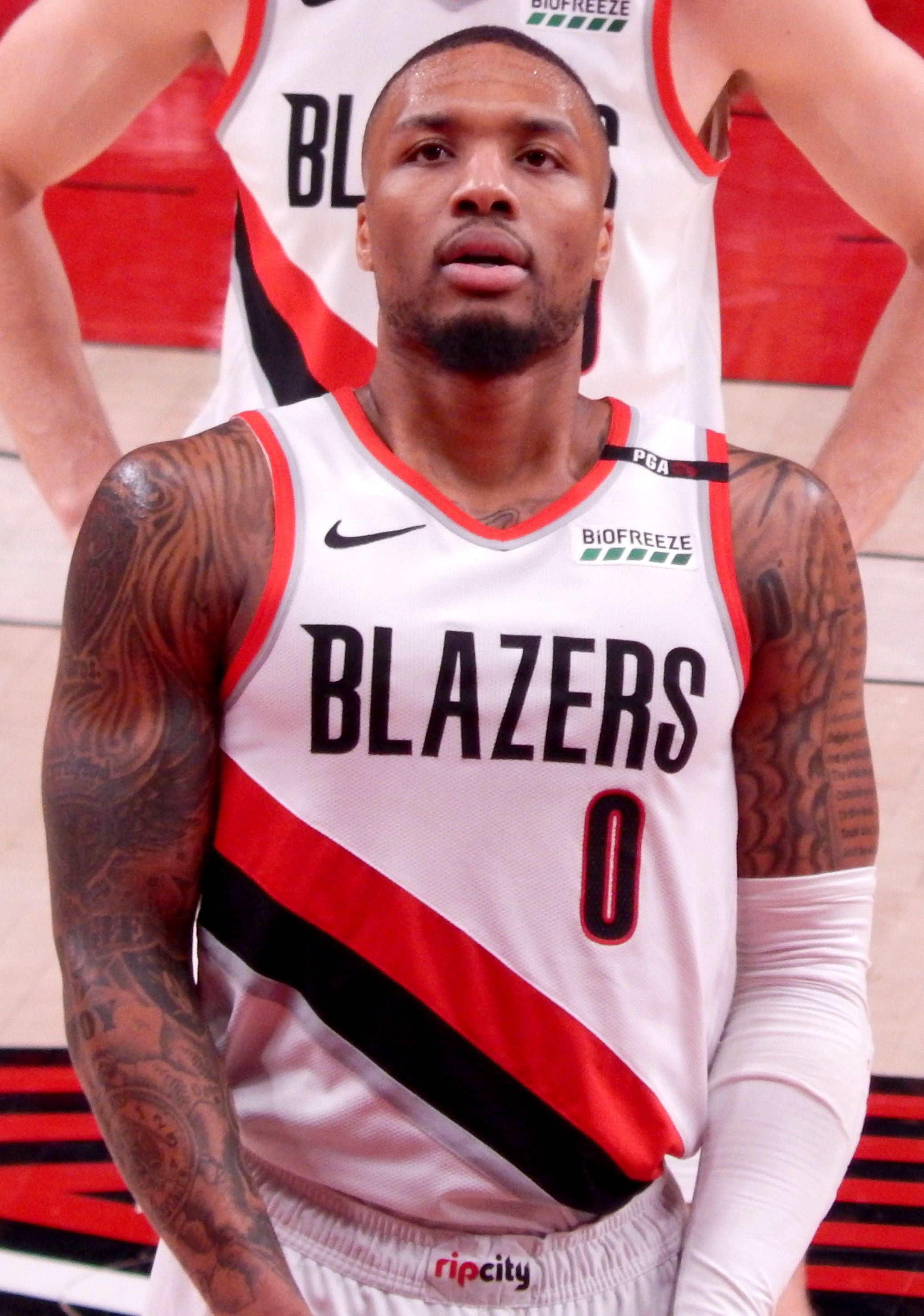
Damian Lillard is a seven-time NBA All-Star (2014, 2015, 2018, 2019, 2020, 2021, 2023) and was the unanimous choice for the NBA Rookie of the Year following the 2012–13 season.

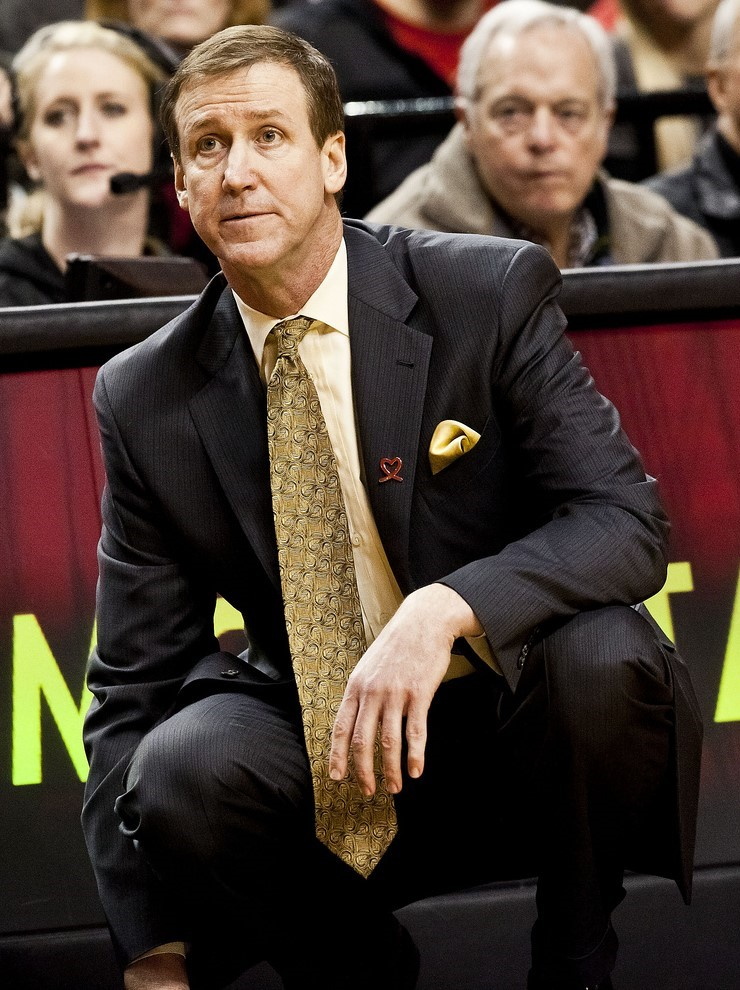
The former Trail Blazers head coach Terry Stotts.

On June 28, 2012, the Blazers selected Weber State guard Damian Lillard and University of Illinois center Meyers Leonard with the 6th and 11th picks overall, respectively. They also selected University of Memphis guard Will Barton with the 40th pick overall, and traded the rights of the 41st overall pick, University of Kansas guard Tyshawn Taylor, to the Brooklyn Nets for cash considerations.

Headed by their new general manager Olshey, the Trail Blazers front office further made a few changes during July 2012. The Blazers signed their 30th pick from the 2006 draft, Joel Freeland, and their 22nd pick from the 2009 draft, Víctor Claver, as well as re-signing Hickson and Nicolas Batum. They also signed veteran point guard Ronnie Price to back up Lillard, who was selected as co-MVP of the 2012 Las Vegas Summer League. Dallas Mavericks assistant coach Terry Stotts was hired as head coach on August 7, 2012.

Under the reins of Lillard, the Blazers played well into January 2013, posting a 20–15 record. On January 11, 2013, at home against the Miami Heat, Wesley Matthews made two consecutive three-pointers late in the fourth quarter to help the Blazers secure a 92–90 victory. However, despite the Blazers remaining among the playoff contenders for most of the season, injuries to starters Batum, LaMarcus Aldridge, and Matthews, as well as a losing streak of 13 games – the longest in the franchise's history – led to the 11th position in the West, with a 33–49 record. Averaging 19.0 points, 6.5 assists, and 3.1 rebounds, Lillard was unanimously named Rookie of the Year, joining Ralph Sampson, David Robinson, and Blake Griffin as the only unanimous selections in NBA history.

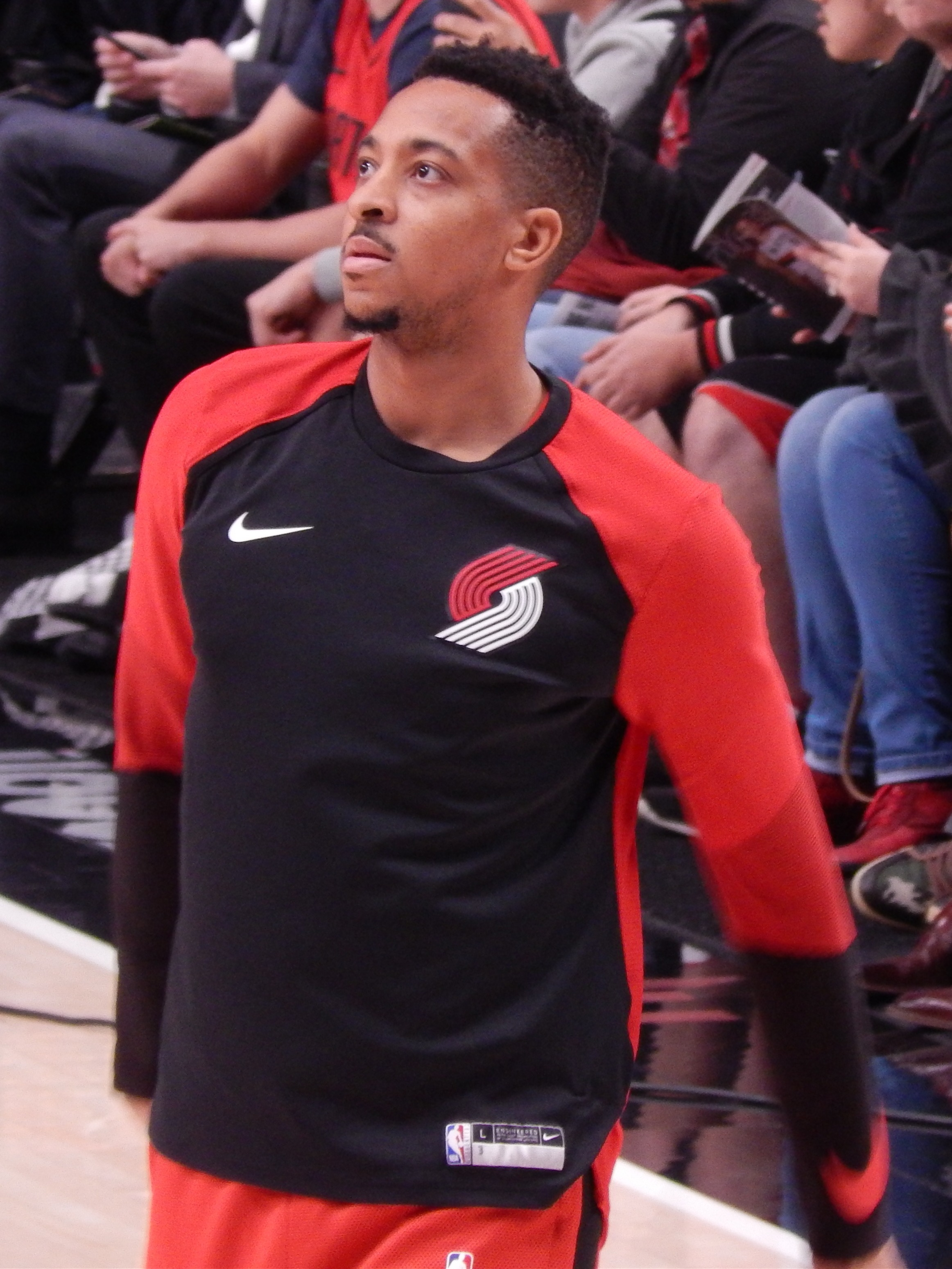
CJ McCollum, drafted 10th overall in 2013, formed a formidable back-court duo with Lillard.

Going into the 2013 NBA draft, the Trail Blazers held four picks: the 10th pick in the first round and three second-round picks. The Blazers selected guard CJ McCollum out of Lehigh University with their 10th pick, and also selected center Jeff Withey from Kansas, power forward Grant Jerrett from Arizona, and Montenegrin big man Marko Todorović. In addition, Cal guard Allen Crabbe was acquired from the Cleveland Cavaliers in exchange for two second-round picks, in the 2015 and 2016 drafts.

The Blazers finished the 2014 season with 21 more wins than the previous season, which amounted for the largest single-season improvement in franchise history. This included a period in November when they won 11 straight games, and 13–2 in the month overall, for which coach Terry Stotts took home Coach of the Month honors. On December 12, 2013, Aldridge scored 31 points and pulled down 25 rebounds in a home game against the Rockets, the first time a Trail Blazers' player recorded a 30-point, 25-rebound game. On December 14, 2013, the Blazers made a franchise-record 21 three-pointers against the Philadelphia 76ers. They tied the new record 19 days later against the Charlotte Bobcats, becoming the first NBA team to make 20 or more three-pointers in a game more than once in a season. Lillard was voted in as a reserve to his first All-Star game, joining Aldridge to represent Portland at the game. Portland finished 54–28, securing the fifth seed in the playoffs against the Rockets. The team also shot 81.5% at the free throw line, made 770 three-pointers, and started four players for all 82 regular season games, all franchise records.

The first-round series against the Rockets was a tight one, with three of the six games going to overtime. The Blazers fared well in the first two games despite not having home-court advantage, beating Houston 122–120 and 112–105 in Games 1 and 2 respectively, fueled by Aldridge's 46 points and 18 rebounds in Game 1, and 43 points and 3 blocks in Game 2. In the sixth game of the series with the Rockets threatening to force a Game 7 back in Houston, down by two points with 0.9 seconds left in the game, Damian Lillard hit a buzzer-beating three-pointer to close out the series (the moment was later nicknamed "Rip City Revival", as Portland advanced to the semifinals for the first time since 2000, where they lost to the eventual champion San Antonio Spurs in five games).

During the 2014 off-season, Olshey signed center Chris Kaman and two-time former Blazers' guard Steve Blake to bolster the bench. Expectations by sportswriters and analysts were high for the Trail Blazers going into the 2015 NBA season given their surprise success in 2013–14. The Blazers beat the reigning Northwest Division Champion Oklahoma City Thunder, 106–89, in their season opener at home on October 29, 2014. Like the season before, the Trail Blazers dominated the month of November, at one point winning nine straight games from November 9 to 26 before being defeated by the Memphis Grizzlies. Injuries, which had not been significant the previous season, started to inflict themselves on various players. Starting center Lopez fractured his right hand in a game against the Spurs on December 15, 2014, and missed the next 23 games. Initially, the Blazers were much unfazed, winning 129–119 in triple overtime against the Spurs on December 19, a game that saw Lillard and Aldridge combine for 75 points on 29 field goals; Lillard netted a career-high 43 points. Four days later, Lillard hit a three-pointer to tie the game and force overtime against the Thunder en route to 40 points and a 115–111 victory. Three Blazers went to New Orleans for the All Star Weekend: Matthews for the Foot Locker Three-Point Contest, Lillard as a reserve to the All-Star Game, and Aldridge as a starter to the All-Star game.

More injuries appeared around the start of the new year, which caused Aldridge, Batum, and Joel Freeland to miss various amounts of time, but none greater than Wesley Matthews' season-ending Achilles tendon tear on March 5, 2015. Called "the heart and soul" of the team by Aldridge, Matthews was in the midst of a career year when the injury occurred. In the first half of the season, the Blazers had a record of 30–11, allowed opponents to score an average of 97.0 points, and held them to 29.7% shooting on three-pointers; in the second half, the Blazers regressed to a 21–20 record, allowed 100.2 points, and let opponents shoot 37.9% from three. The Blazers clinched a return trip to the playoffs on March 30, 2015, defeating the Phoenix Suns, 109–86. Finishing the season 51–31, they clinched their first Northwest Division title since 1999 but fell to the Grizzlies in five games in the first round of the playoffs.

In the 2015 NBA draft, the Blazers selected Arizona forward Rondae Hollis-Jefferson and subsequently traded him to the Brooklyn Nets along with Steve Blake for center Mason Plumlee and the 42nd pick, Pat Connaughton.

After losing four of their five starters at the end of the 2015–16 season, the Blazers won 44 games, were the 5th seed in the Western Conference, and beat the Clippers in six games in the first round, but were eliminated by the Golden State Warriors in five games in the Conference Semifinals.

In May 2017, the team revealed their new logo, an update of the pinwheel design with a new wordmark. According to Chris McGowan, president and CEO of the Trail Blazers, "Together, we landed on subtle changes that provide a nod to our past while allowing us to modernize other aspects of our creative assets."

The 2017–18 season saw the Blazers finish with the third seed for the first time since the 1999–2000 season. On April 21, 2018, they were eliminated in the first round of the playoffs by the New Orleans Pelicans in a 4–0 sweep.

Paul Allen, owner of the Trail Blazers since 1988, died of cancer on October 15, 2018, at the age of 65. His sister Jody Allen has named executor and trustee of his estate.

In the 2018–19 season, the Blazers finished the regular season 53–29, giving them the third seed in the Western Conference. In the first round of the playoffs, the Trail Blazers defeated the favored Oklahoma City Thunder in five games, a series which included Damian Lillard's game winning, buzzer beating, 37-foot three-pointer in Game 5, giving them their first playoff series win since 2016. In the second round of the playoffs, they faced the Denver Nuggets. The series included a 140–137 Game 3 victory by the Blazers in the first quadruple-overtime game of the NBA playoffs since 1953. The Blazers eventually won the series in seven games and advanced to their first Conference Finals since 2000. In the Western Conference Finals, they faced the two-time defending champion, the Golden State Warriors. However, they lost the series in four games, and were swept.

Following the suspension of the 2019–20 NBA season, the Blazers were one of the 22 teams invited to the NBA Bubble to participate in the final 8 games of the regular season. They erupted to number 8 but, after winning a "play-in game" over Memphis, were eliminated by Lakers in five games in the first round. The NBA decided that, at the end of the regular season part of "The Bubble" in Orlando, if the ninth seed was within four games of the eighth seed, the two teams would play at least one game. If the eighth seed won (as the Blazers did), then the play-in was over. If the ninth seed won, then another "winner-take-all" game would be played for the eighth seed. The NBA adopted a version of the play-in, a "tournament", for the postseason following the 2020–2021 season, which the Blazers avoided by finishing sixth. That play-in tournament returned for the postseason after the 2021–2022 season.

On June 4, 2021, following a first-round loss in the 2021 NBA playoffs to the Denver Nuggets, the team and head coach Stotts mutually agreed to part ways. After moving on from coach Stotts, the team hired Chauncey Billups as the franchise's next head coach.

On February 8, 2022, in the midst of a losing season filled with injuries, the Blazers elected to trade CJ McCollum to the New Orleans Pelicans. Without McCollum in the lineup, there was an opportunity for Anfernee Simons to lead the Blazers offense. Simons play for the remainder of the season, earned him a multi-year extension.

On June 22, 2022, the Blazers received Detroit Pistons forward Jerami Grant in exchange for 2023 and 2025 draft picks.

On June 23, 2022, in the 2022 NBA draft, the Blazers selected guard Shaedon Sharpe out of the University of Kentucky and forward Jabari Walker from the University of Colorado with the 7th and 57th picks, respectively. In the 2022–23 regular season, the Blazers started well, and at one point were the top seed in the West, but then bit by bit slipped out of playoff contention. Lillard promptly requested a trade on July 1, and Portland began exploring options, though taking their time. General manager Joe Cronin was quoted as saying, "If it takes months, it takes months."

In the 2023 NBA draft, the Blazers selected guard Scoot Henderson with the third overall pick. Henderson was a standout from the NBA G league team, the NBA G League Ignite.

== 2023–2024: Rebuilding ==
On September 27, 2023, the Blazers acquired Jrue Holiday, Deandre Ayton, and Toumani Camara as part of a trade that sent Lillard to the Milwaukee Bucks and Grayson Allen, Jusuf Nurkić, Nassir Little, and Keon Johnson to the Phoenix Suns. Additionally, the Blazers acquired a 2029 first-round draft pick, with the option to swap with the Bucks for the 2028 and 2030 first-round picks. Four days later, Holiday was traded to the Boston Celtics in exchange for Robert Williams III, Malcolm Brogdon, and two future first-round draft picks.

== 2024–present: The Deni Avdija era and return of Damian Lillard ==
With the seventh selection of the 2024 NBA draft, the Blazers selected Donovan Clingan, a center from UConn. The same day, they acquired Deni Avdija from the Washington Wizards in exchange for Brogdon, the 14th overall pick Bub Carrington, a 2029 first-round pick, and 2028 and 2030 second-round picks.

On July 19, 2025, Damian Lillard returned to the Trail Blazers after being waived by the Milwaukee Bucks, but was expected to miss the season while recuperating from a torn Achilles tendon. On October 23, 2025, the Federal Bureau of Investigation (FBI) announced that head coach Chauncey Billups was arrested as part of two separate illegal gambling-related cases. The NBA announced that it placed Billups on "immediate leave", while assistant coach Tiago Splitter was named interim head coach.

=== 2025–present: Dundon's ownership and arrival of Ja Morant ===
On August 23, 2025, Carolina Hurricanes owner Thomas Dundon purchased the Blazers for approximately $4.2 billion from the estate of Paul Allen. On March 30, 2026, the NBA Board of Governors approved the sale for $4.25 billion.

On June 24, 2026, the team hired Minnesota Timberwolves assistant coach Micah Nori as the next head coach to replace Splitter.

On June 29, 2026, the Trail Blazers is adding guard Ja Morant in exchange for Jerami Grant and Kris Murray both of them moving to Memphis.

== Rivalries ==
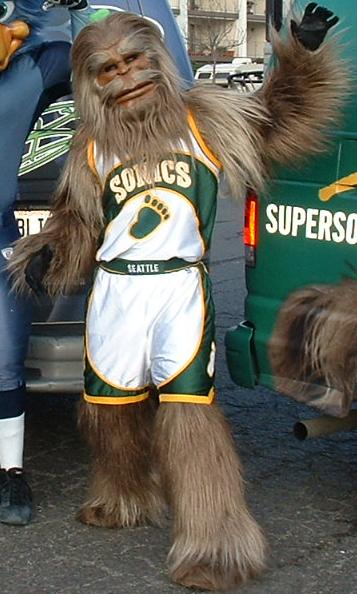
Until their relocation to Oklahoma City, the Seattle SuperSonics were one of the Trail Blazers fiercest rivals.

=== The "I-5 Rivalry" ===
The Seattle SuperSonics were the traditional rivals of the Blazers. Due to the proximity of the teams, the rivalry had been dubbed the "I-5 Rivalry" in reference to the Interstate 5 freeway that connects the two cities. A number of fans made the trip up to Seattle for the games, with Seattle fans making the trek down to Portland for their games. The rivalry was fairly equal in accomplishments, with both teams winning one championship each. The all-time record of this rivalry ended at 98–94 in favor of the SuperSonics.

==== Trail Blazers vs. The Oregonian ====
Relations between the team and The Oregonian have often been tense; the paper is editorially independent of the team and is often critical. During the Steve Patterson era, relations between the two institutions became increasingly hostile; several NBA executives told ESPN's Chris Sheridan that the situation was the "most dysfunctional media-team relationship" that they could recall. Much of the hostility started after an incident in which forward Darius Miles called coach Maurice Cheeks an ethnic slur in 2005, and was suspended for two games, a number of fans considered to be insufficient. A proposed agreement was negotiated behind the scenes between the team and the player to refund much of his fine provided he drop appeals to the players' union. Details of this agreement were leaked to Oregonian columnist John Canzano, who reported the existence of the agreement in his column, criticizing the team for its apparent duplicity. The Trail Blazers denied that such an agreement was in the works, at which point the paper published the leaked memo online; the team would later claim that the memo came from Miles' agent.

The relationship between the paper and the team continued to deteriorate over the following year. In May 2006, the team instituted a new policy requiring that it be permitted to record all interviews of team players and staff, including the right to post transcripts or recordings on the team website. Prior to the 2006 NBA draft, a group of reporters was invited to a pre-draft workout the team was holding. During a portion of the workout which was closed to the media, an Oregonian reporter looked through a curtain separating the press from the workout, and observed Gonzaga University star Adam Morrison, then considered a likely draft prospect for the team, playing poorly; he wrote about this on his blog. The team was outraged, and published a scathing criticism of Jason Quick on its website, closing subsequent practices to the press altogether. John Canzano responded with outrage on this blog, called the team "paranoid", and referred to Art Sasse, the Blazers' VP of communications, as a "henchman" and "Steve Patterson's personal bootlicker". Henry Abbott of ESPN blog TrueHoop commented that the team had gone "off the deep end", noting that "[t]here has never been a team of any kind, in the history of eternity, that won over the public while declaring war on the reporters covering the team."

In November 2006, the Oregonian commissioned an outside editor, Craig Lancaster of the San Jose Mercury-News, to investigate the deteriorating relationship between the paper and the team's management, a move the rival Willamette Week called "unusual". In the report, Lancaster criticized both sides somewhat, but did not make any revelations which were unexpected. Canzano referred to the piece as "ill conceived" and a "waste of space"; the team found the article unsatisfying as well.

== Fan support and "Blazermania" ==
Trail Blazers regular-season attendance figures, 1970–2023
Season	Total	Average	No. of games	Notes
1970–71	245,383	6,135	41	Inaugural season
1971–72	279,506	6,988	41	
1972–73	333,480	8,134	41	
1973–74	327,495	7,988	41	
1974–75	441,506	10,768	41	First season with Bill Walton
1975–76	413,992	10,097	41	
1976–77	499,302	12,178	41	Won NBA title; Sellout streak started.
1977–78	519,306	12,666	41	Won Pacific Division
1978–79	519,306	12,666	41	
1979–80	519,306	12,666	41	
1980–81	519,306	12,666	41	
1981–82	519,306	12,666	41	
1982–83	519,306	12,666	41	
1983–84	519,306	12,666	41	First season with Clyde Drexler
1984–85	519,306	12,666	41	
1985–86	519,306	12,666	41	
1986–87	519,306	12,666	41	
1987–88	519,306	12,666	41	
1988–89	527,008	12,854	41	Seating added to Memorial Coliseum
1989–90	528,244	12,884	41	Advanced to NBA Finals
1990–91	528,244	12,884	41	Won Pacific Division
1991–92	528,408	12,888	41	Won Pacific Division; Advanced to NBA Finals
1992–93	528,408	12,888	41	
1993–94	528,408	12,888	41	
1994–95	529,759	12,921	41	Includes attendance for one game played in Yokohama, Japan
1995–96	850,338	20,740	41	First season in Rose Garden; Sellout streak ends
1996–97	852,799	20,800	41	
1997–98	843,647	20,577	41	
1998–99	486,556	19,462	25	Lockout-shortened season; Won Pacific Division; Advanced to Western Finals
1999–00	835,078	20,368	41	Advanced to Western Finals
2000–01	831,376	20,277	41	
2001–02	797,821	19,459	41	
2002–03	796,258	19,421	41	50 wins
2003–04	684,038	16,684	41	No playoffs (41–41 record)
2004–05	680,374	16,594	41	No playoffs (27–55 record); RG bankruptcy filed
2005–06	617,199	15,053	41	No playoffs; NBA's worst record (21–61)
2006–07	670,778	16,360	41	First season with Brandon Roy and LaMarcus Aldridge; No playoffs
2007–08	801,566	19,550	41	Greg Oden (#1 selection) injured for the whole season
2008–09	841,499	20,524	41	Team marketing changes to reflect the entire Pacific Northwest; loses archrival team.
2009–10	840,411	20,497	41	
2010–11	840,924	20,510	41	
2011–12	676,384	20,496	33	Lockout-shortened season
2012–13	813,012	19,829	41	First season with Damian Lillard
2013–14	809,612	19,746	41	First season with CJ McCollum
2014–15	801,733	19,554	41	Won Northwest Division
2015–16	794,085	19,367	41	
2016–17	792,029	19,317	41	
2017–18	795,328	19,398	41	Won Northwest Division
2018–19	799,345	19,496	41	Death of owner Paul Allen; Advanced to Western Finals
2019–20	608,634	19,633	36	Season shortened due to the COVID-19 pandemic
2020–21	7,756	1,939	36	Minimal fans allowed to attend due to COVID-19
2021–22	705,608	17,209	41	
2022–23	767,374	18,716	41	

The relationship between the team and its fans, commonly known as "Blazermania", has been well-chronicled. The Trail Blazers have long been one of the NBA's top draws, with the exception of two periods in the team's history. The team drew poorly during its first four seasons of existence, failing to average more than 10,000 spectators per game. Attendance increased in 1974, when the team drafted Bill Walton.

The phenomenon known as Blazermania started during the 1976–1977 season, when the team posted its first winning record, made its first playoff appearance, and captured its only NBA title, defeating the heavily favored Philadelphia 76ers in the NBA Finals; the team has been wildly popular in Portland since that time. That season, the team started their sellout streak which continued until the team moved into the Rose Garden in 1995. The team continued to average over 19,000 spectators per game until the 2003–04 season.

Attendance declined significantly in the 2003–04 season, as the team continued to suffer image problems due to the "Jail Blazer" reputation it had gained, and was no longer competitive on the court. Writing for the New York Times, NBA columnist Chris Broussard remarked that Blazermania was "dead". A series of management miscues, including the Rose Garden arena bankruptcy, took a further toll on attendance, and the team posted two straight seasons with less than thirty wins, including the worst campaign of the 2005–06 NBA season with 21 wins and 61 losses. After drafting eventual Rookie of the Year Brandon Roy in 2006, attendance climbed a bit in the 2006–07 season, as the team was more competitive and posted a 32–50 record. Some expected that the selection of Greg Oden in the 2007 NBA draft would cause attendance to increase. Prior to his season-ending knee surgery, season ticket sales were markedly up. Even with Oden on crutches on the sideline, the team's 2007–08 home opener, a 93–90 victory over the New Orleans Hornets, was a sellout. The season culminated in 32 sold-out home games, of which the final 27 home games were consecutive sell-outs.

== List of coaches ==
The complete list of Trail Blazers' head coaches, and their tenures, is as follows:

- Rolland Todd, 1970–1972
- Stu Inman, 1972 (interim)
- Jack McCloskey, 1972–1974
- Lenny Wilkens, 1974–1976
- Dr. Jack Ramsay, 1976–1986
- Mike Schuler, 1986–1989
- Rick Adelman, 1989 (interim), 1989–1994
- P. J. Carlesimo, 1994–1997
- Mike Dunleavy, 1997–2001
- Maurice Cheeks, 2001–2005
- Kevin Pritchard, 2005 (interim)
- Nate McMillan, 2005–2012
- Kaleb Canales, 2012–2012 (interim)
- Terry Stotts, 2012–2021
- Chauncey Billups, 2021–2025
- Tiago Splitter, 2025–2026 (interim)
- Micah Nori, 2026–present

Among Trail Blazers' assistants who have served as head coaches elsewhere in the NBA are Dick Harter, Mike D'Antoni, Bill Musselman and Rick Carlisle. Two former UNLV men's basketball coaches, Bill Bayno and Tim Grgurich, have served on the Blazers' coaching staff.

== Records vs. opponents ==
Updated through January 7, 2024.

Team	Regular season games	Regular season W	Regular season L	W / L %	Postseason
Atlanta Hawks	122	61	61	.500	-
Boston Celtics	122	49	73	.402	-
Brooklyn Nets	97	68	29	.701	-
Charlotte Hornets	65	47	18	.723	-
Chicago Bulls	132	67	65	.508	4–5 (.444)
Cleveland Cavaliers	132	73	59	.553	-
Dallas Mavericks	175	90	85	.514	11–9 (.550)
Denver Nuggets	195	102	93	.544	11–12 (.478)
Detroit Pistons	126	71	55	.563	1–4 (.200)
Golden State Warriors	245	130	115	.531	1–12 (.077)
Houston Rockets	210	96	114	.457	8–12 (.400)
Indiana Pacers	99	61	38	.616	-
Los Angeles Clippers	240	148	92	.617	4–2 (.667)
Los Angeles Lakers	243	114	129	.469	17–36 (.321)
Memphis Grizzlies	103	57	46	.553	1–4 (.200)
Miami Heat	69	42	27	.609	-
Milwaukee Bucks	134	53	81	.396	-
Minnesota Timberwolves	131	90	41	.687	3–1 (.750)
New Orleans Pelicans	72	37	35	.514	0–4 (.000)
New York Knicks	121	70	51	.584	-
Oklahoma City Thunder	252	120	132	.476	12–9 (.571)
Orlando Magic	68	40	28	.588	-
Philadelphia 76ers	122	59	63	.484	4–2 (.667)
Phoenix Suns	243	112	131	.461	16–15 (.516)
Sacramento Kings	228	141	87	.627	1–2 (.333)
San Antonio Spurs	186	92	94	.495	6–14 (.300)
Toronto Raptors	54	34	20	.630	-
Utah Jazz	207	93	114	.449	19–12 (.613)
Washington Wizards	122	64	58	.525	-
	4,315	2,281	2,034	.529	119-155 (.434)
